= 2026 Hungarian parliamentary election =

- 12 April 2026

All 199 seats in the National Assembly 100 seats needed for a majority
- Opinion polls
- Registered: 8,112,646
- Turnout: 78.99% (▲9.40 pp)
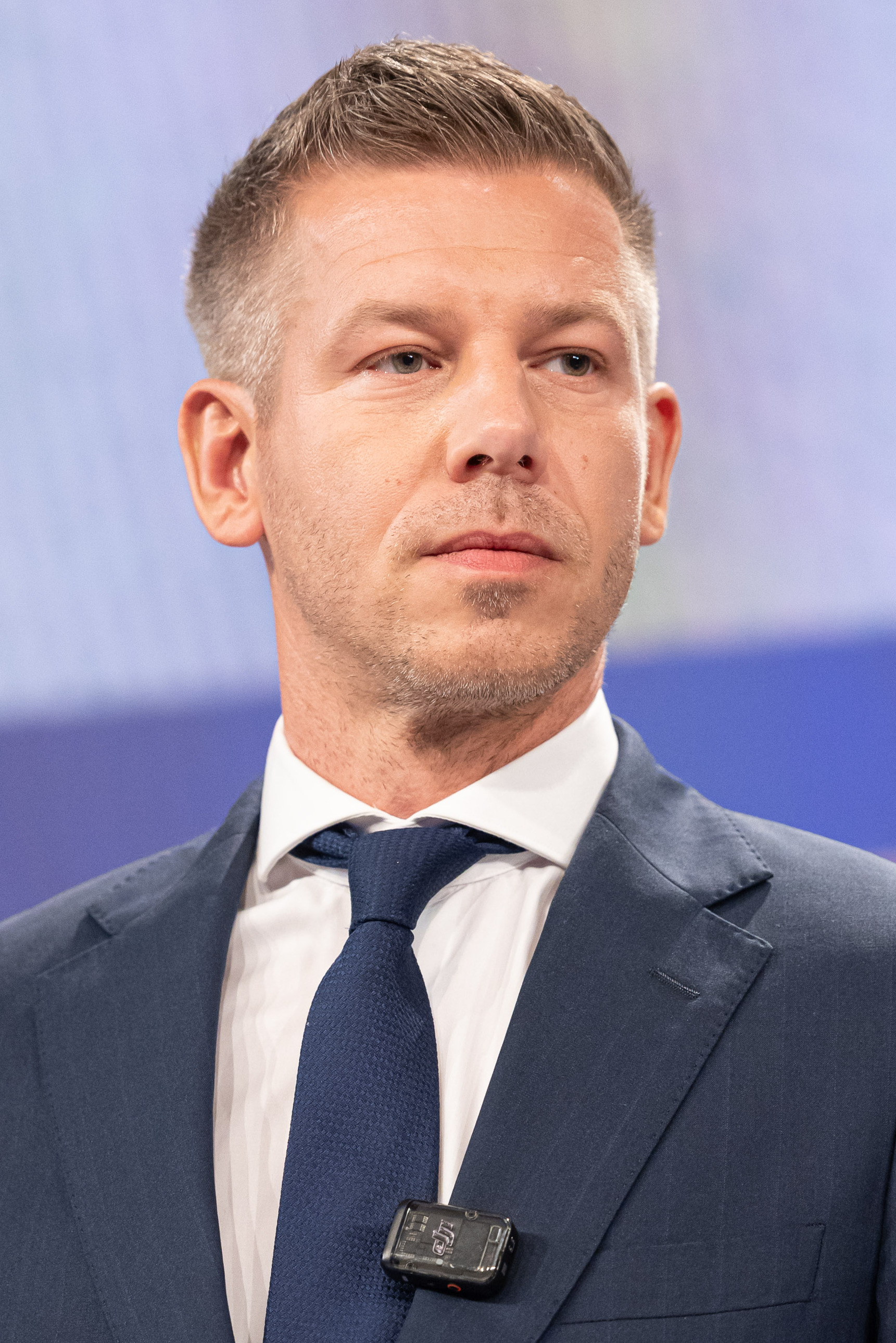

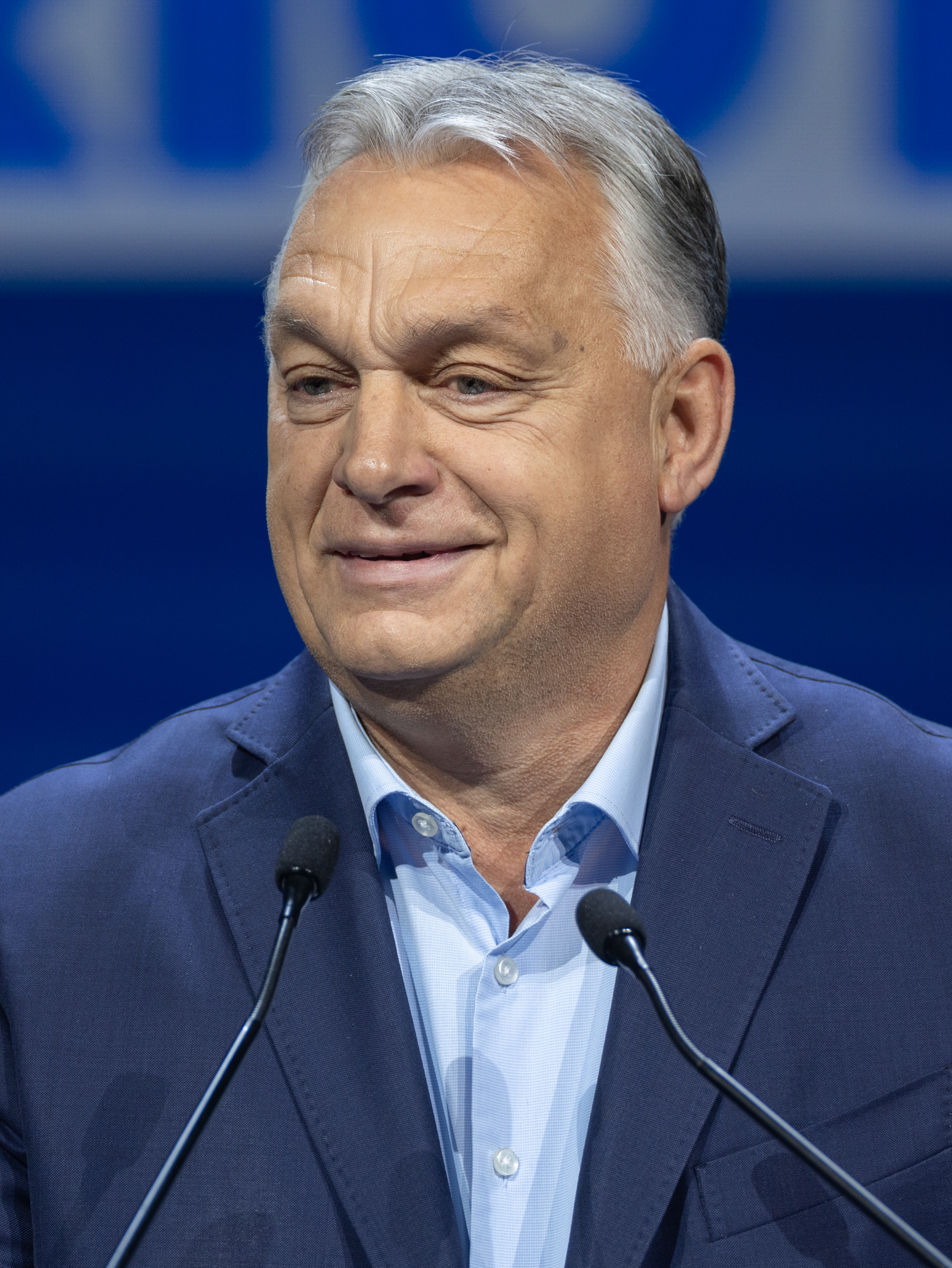

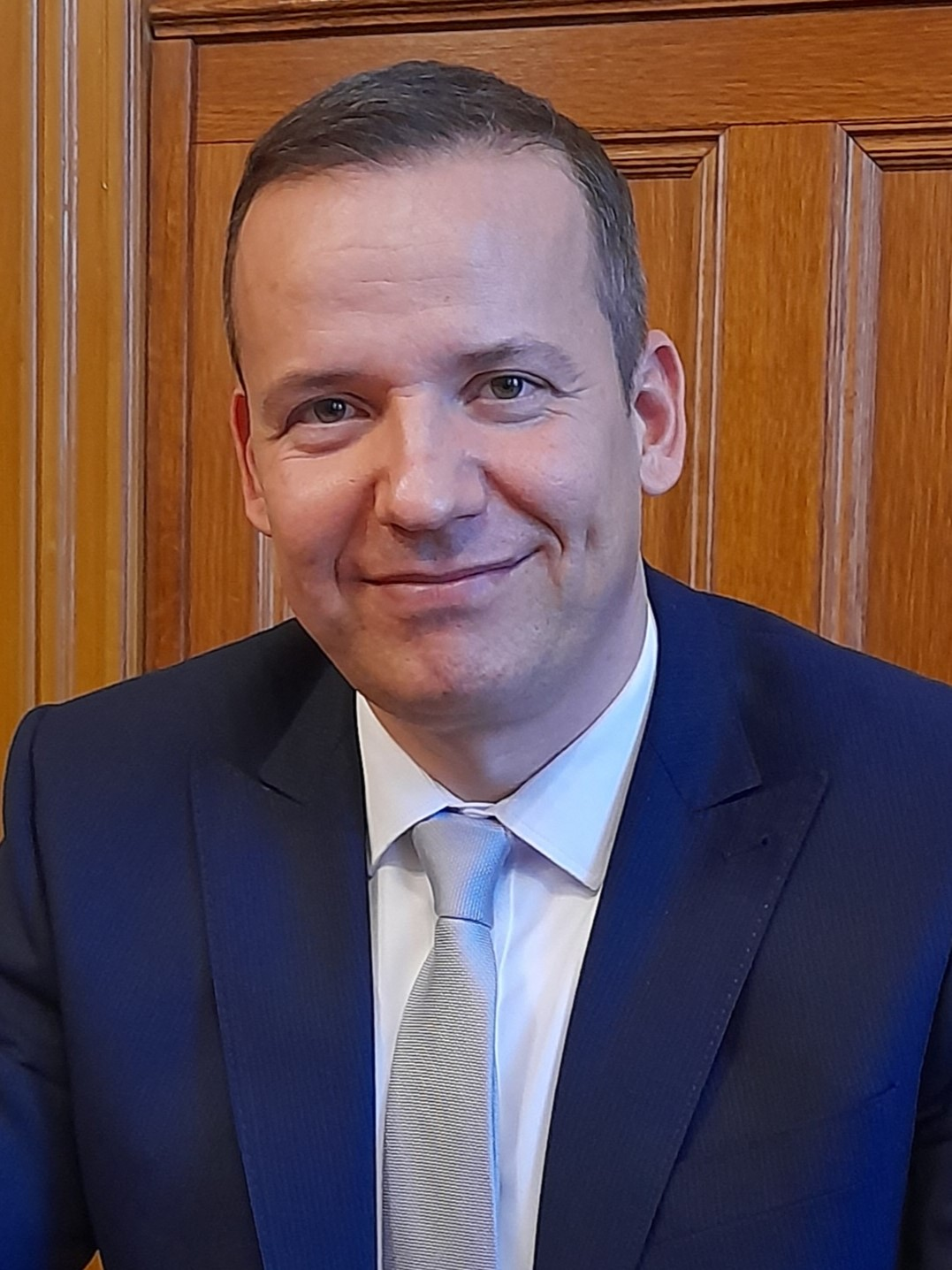
	First party	Second party	Third party
Leader	Péter Magyar	Viktor Orbán	László Toroczkai
Party	TISZA	Fidesz	MH
Alliance		Fidesz–KDNP
Leader since	22 July 2024	17 May 2003 (Note: As Fidesz leader)	23 June 2018
Last election	Did not contest (Note: The party was founded in 2020 but did not run in the 2022 Hungarian parliamentary election.)	135 seats, 54.13%	6 seats, 5.88%
Seats won	141	52	6
Seat change	New party	▼83	0
Constituency vote	3,333,415	2,215,225	345,252
%	55.26%	36.72%	5.72%
Party vote	3,385,890	2,458,337	358,372
% and swing	53.18% (New)	38.61% (▼15.52 pp)	5.63% (▼0.25 pp)
Government before election
Fifth Orbán Government
Fidesz–KDNP
Government after election
Magyar Government
Tisza

Parliamentary elections were held in Hungary on 12 April 2026 to elect all 199 members of the National Assembly. It was the 10th parliamentary election and the highest-turnout election since Hungary's transition to democracy in 1990. The incumbent Fidesz–KDNP government of Prime Minister Viktor Orbán was defeated in a landslide by the opposition Tisza Party, led by MEP and former Fidesz member Péter Magyar, ending the 16-year Orbán era. The Tisza Party won 141 seats out of the 199 in the National Assembly, enough for a two-thirds supermajority, the legislative threshold to amend the Fundamental Law. In so doing, Tisza won both the largest number of votes and the largest percentage of seats that a Hungarian political party has ever won in a free election.

Orbán, the longest-serving prime minister in Hungarian history, is the leader of Fidesz, variously described as a national-conservative, Christian nationalist or far-right party with authoritarian and illiberal tendencies. In an alliance with the Christian Democratic People's Party, Fidesz was seeking a fifth consecutive term (sixth overall). Magyar is the leader of Tisza, a conservative centre-right party, which ran on a pro-European, anti-corruption, centrist, and populist platform. The only other party to cross the electoral threshold was the ultranationalist and far-right Our Homeland Movement led by László Toroczkai. Most of the other parties pulled out of the campaign in order to prevent Fidesz from taking advantage of vote-splitting.

In the lead-up to the election, analysts described the election as the most important one in the European Union in 2026 and a referendum on whether Hungary would continue to drift towards authoritarianism and Russia or change course towards liberal democracy and the EU. There were fraud accusations before the elections by both major parties. Results reflected independent polling showing Tisza with a clear lead, while pro-government pollsters projected a Fidesz win. Orbán conceded defeat on election night and congratulated Magyar, as did various international leaders. Magyar's victory was described as a victory for the EU and as a loss for Russia under Vladimir Putin, the United States under Donald Trump, and global far-right movements.

According to constitutional practice, the president of Hungary grants the person most likely to command a majority in the National Assembly the first chance to form the incoming government. President Tamás Sulyok met with all three parliamentary party and alliance leaders—Magyar, Orbán, and Toroczkai—on 15 April, three days after the election, and announced he would propose Magyar as Prime Minister when the legislature convened. The National Assembly convened on 9 May and elected Magyar prime minister.

== Background ==
=== Hungary under Viktor Orbán ===
Orbán, the president of Fidesz since 2003 (he was previously the party leader from 1993 to 2000) and the co-president of the Fidesz–KDNP alliance formed in 2005, served as Prime Minister of Hungary from 1998 to 2002 and again from 2010 onwards, making him the longest tenured leader in the European Union. His government promoted Christian nationalism. During his rule, Hungary underwent major constitutional, political, and institutional changes that led many observers to describe it as a hybrid regime, or illiberal democracy, that blends democracy with authoritarianism as it moved away from the rule of law. In a 2014 speech, Orbán himself described Hungary under his rule as an "illiberal state". Initially a liberal during the 1990s and early 2000s, he eventually evolved his politics closer to the radical right and the far-right, being widely considered one of the leaders of the global far-right.

The 2026 election was scheduled for 12 April, the same day of the successful 2003 Hungarian EU membership referendum. The major opposition came from Magyar and his Tisza Party, a centre-right and pro-European political party. Politico Europe described it as the most important election in the EU in 2026, while DW News described the election as a referendum on whether Hungary would continue to drift towards authoritarianism and Russia or change course towards liberal democracy and the EU. Some analysts argued that Magyar had leaned into some core continuities with Fidesz—including the use of nationalist and populist rhetoric, skepticism about Ukraine's accession to the EU, and rejection of the EU migration and asylum pact—and that a Magyar government was likely to continue these policies. Prior to the election, an analysis by Eulytix of Tisza Party's voting record in the European Parliament showed that "while Tisza Party MEPs are mostly aligned with pro-EU forces, they also engage in tactical alignment with Fidesz on politically sensitive issues such as Ukraine, agriculture and migration."

=== 2022 election ===
On 3 April 2022, with 54.13% of the popular vote, Fidesz–KDNP received the highest vote share by any party or alliance since 1990. It won two-thirds of the seats for the fourth time. The United for Hungary alliance suffered a heavy defeat and was shortly after dissolved; its members sat in separate political groups in the National Assembly. From other minor parties, only Our Homeland Movement reached the threshold for entry, while Hungarian Two-Tailed Dog Party, Solution Movement, and Party of Normal Life did not. The European Parliament views Hungary as a "hybrid regime of electoral autocracy" since 2022 and considers Hungary according to Article 7.1 of the Treaty on European Union in clear risk of a serious breach of the Treaty on European Union. In January 2024, a majority of MEPs voted for a resolution demanding that the Council of the European Union consider that Hungary be stripped of its EU voting rights under Article 7 of the Treaty.

=== Rise of Tisza Party ===
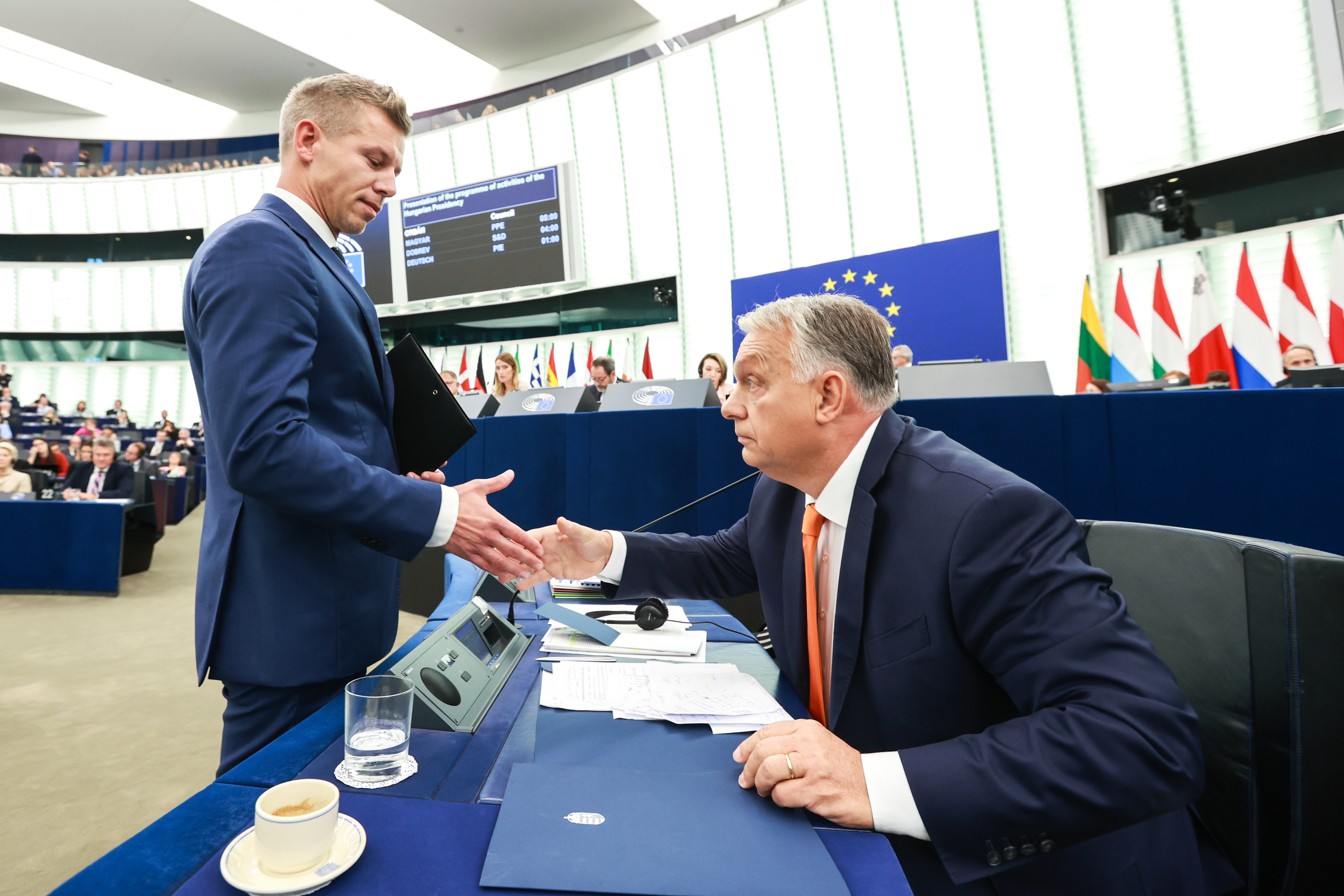
Magyar and Orbán shaking hands in the European Parliament in 2024

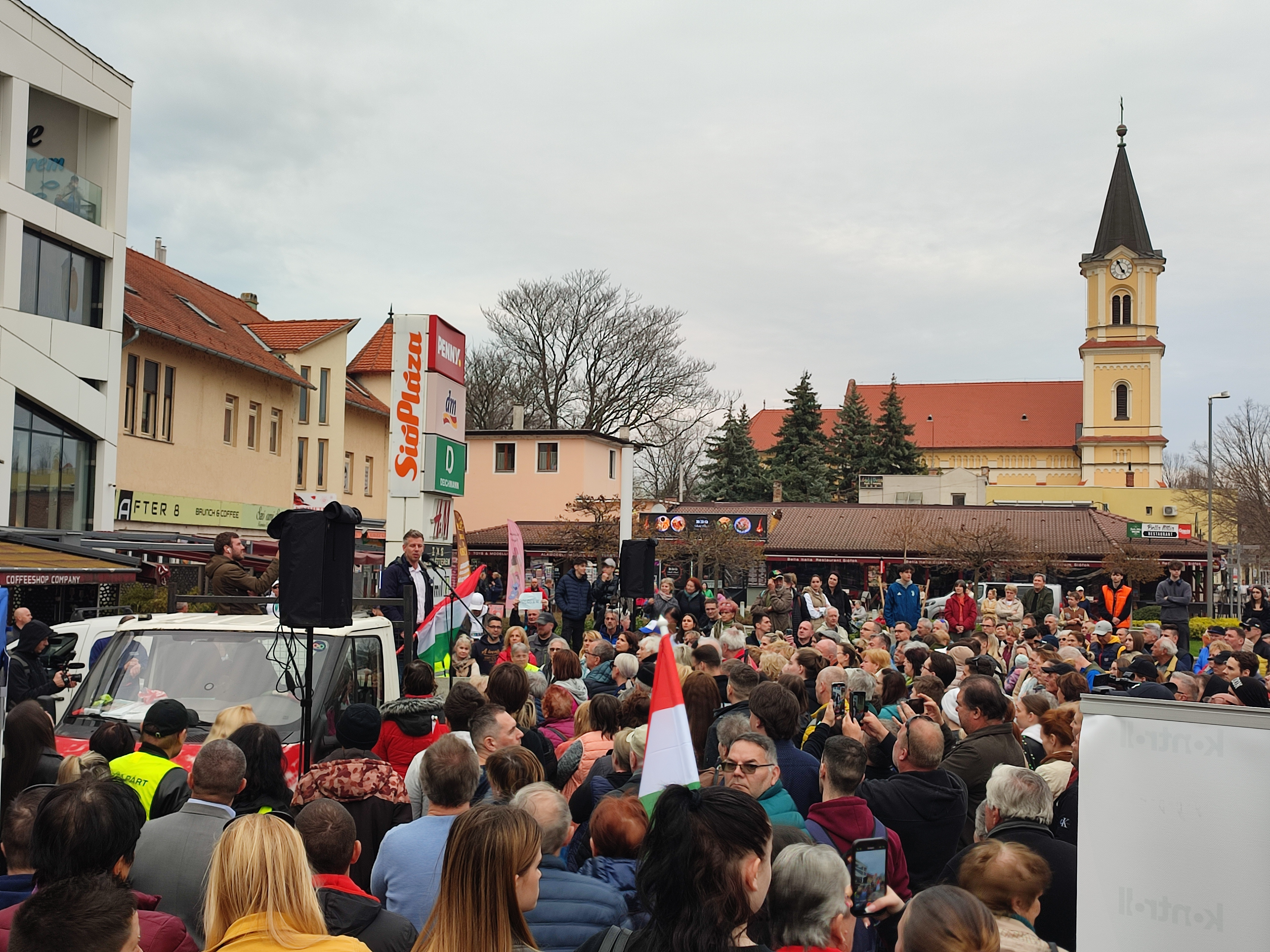
Magyar campaigning at a rally in Siófok in 2025

On 2 February 2024, it was revealed that President Katalin Novák had granted a pardon in April 2023 to a criminal involved in a pedophilia case. The Novák scandal resulted in her resignation and that of former justice minister Judit Varga, who had countersigned the pardon. Not long after, Magyar (Varga's ex-husband) posted on Facebook that he would resign from all of his government-related positions, stating that the past few years had made him realize that the idea of a "national, sovereign, bourgeois Hungary" stated as the goal of Orbán's rule was in fact a "political product" serving to obscure massive corruption and transfers of wealth to those with the right connections.

On 15 March 2024, Magyar, despite initially refusing to participate in politics, held a rally attended by tens of thousands in Budapest at which he announced the formation of a new political party. According to polling conducted that month, around 15% of voters claimed they were "certain or highly likely" to vote for Magyar if he ran for office. On 10 April 2024, Magyar announced his bid to run in both the European Parliament and the General Assembly of Budapest with the then unknown Tisza Party, which finished in second place with nearly 30% of votes, the highest number and percentage of votes by any non-Fidesz party since the 2006 Hungarian parliamentary election. Following the 2024 European Parliament election in Hungary and the 2024 Budapest Assembly election, the strengthening of the Tisza Party continued and according to the independent/opposition-aligned polls, by the end of the year it had become the most popular political party in Hungary, or at least a close competitor to Fidesz, thus overturning the continuous dominance of ruling parties that had lasted since the Őszöd speech came to light.

The Tisza Party selected 103 of its 106 future candidates for the election in a two-round primary late 2025. The party put forward 3 nominees in each district and in the first round all Tisza Sziget members above the age of 16 could vote. Voting took place via a modified Borda count. In the second round, voting was opened also to all resident citizens above 18 who could vote for either of the two advancing candidates. Winners were announced on 28 November 2025.

=== Collapse of the previous opposition ===
Prior to the presidential pardon scandal, the Democratic Coalition was considered as the strongest opposition party; its leading member Klára Dobrev even formed a one-party shadow cabinet in September 2022, which clearly indicated the role of the main challenger against the other opposition parties; however, public opinion polls in the two years after the 2022 parliamentary election measured the party's support at a maximum of 20%. Except for the Momentum Movement, Our Homeland Movement and Hungarian Two-Tailed Dog Party, the opposition parties – Hungarian Socialist Party, Jobbik, Dialogue – The Greens' Party and LMP – Hungary's Green Party – usually did not reach the threshold according to public opinion polls. The two years after the 2022 election were characterized by frozen party relations and political apathy, similar to much of the Orbán era, which consisted of a dominant ruling Fidesz–KDNP and, far behind, the medium and small opposition parties competing with each other for a non-growing bloc of opposition voters. Moreover, the governance by decree, introduced due to the permanent "state of emergency" due to the COVID-19 pandemic and later the Russo-Ukrainian war, significantly eroded the political significance of the parliament.

The appearance and rapid advance of the Tisza Party completely rearranged the political party structure. A few days after Magyar announced his intention to found a party on 15 March 2024, the not-yet-formed political formation was polled at 15%. As a response, the Democratic Coalition concluded an electoral alliance with the Hungarian Socialist Party and the Dialogue – The Greens' Party on 28 March 2024. They agreed that the three parties will run on a unified Social Democrat–Green list, called DK–MSZP–Dialogue Alliance, in the upcoming European Parliament and local elections. The European Parliament election on 9 June 2024 was a complete disaster for the opposition parties; only DK–MSZP–Dialogue Alliance and Our Homeland Movement obtained mandates besides Fidesz–KDNP and Tisza Party, while the remaining parties – Momentum Movement, Hungarian Two-Tailed Dog Party, Jobbik, LMP – Hungary's Green Party, Second Reform Era Party, Everybody's Hungary People's Party and Solution Movement – did not. The Tisza Party's performance was characterized by the media as a challenge to the ruling political elite. The parliamentary opposition was mostly able to retain its seats in the local elections because the newly organized Tisza Party did not participate in that election – with the exception of Budapest. Klára Dobrev dissolved her shadow cabinet on the next day and the DK–MSZP–Dialogue Alliance also ceased to exist in October 2024. While the Tisza Party gradually caught up with Fidesz–KDNP during 2025, and then left it behind in the polls, the parliamentary opposition parties completely eroded.

In May 2025, former Momentum Movement leader András Fekete-Győr urged his party not to contest in the upcoming parliamentary election, claiming that it would only result in the dispersion of opposition votes. His proposal resulted in numerous statements and discussions in the political public in the upcoming weeks. In the next month, two opposition parties, the Everybody's Hungary Peoples' Party and the Momentum Movement decided not to run in the next election in the interest of government change. In Summer 2025, the Yes Solidarity for Hungary Movement, which ran with the Hungarian Workers' Party as Leftist Alliance in some constituencies in 2022 decided not to contest in the upcoming parliamentary election. In January 2026, three other opposition parties – Solution Movement, Second Reform Era Party and LMP – Hungary's Green Party – announced within a week that they will not run in the parliamentary election. On 7 February 2026, Dialogue – The Greens' Party, announced their withdrawal from participation after the rapid failure of their new attempt called the Humanists' Party. On 20 February, the Hungarian Socialist Party – which also governed Hungary between 1994–1998 and 2002–2010, and is one of those parties remaining from the change of system in 1990, alongside Fidesz–KDNP – withdrew from the election, saying that an electoral system that amounted to "legalised cheating" (or "legalised fraud", depending on the translation) could only be overcome by uniting behind "the strongest opposition candidate" regardless of party.

=== Amendment of the electoral law ===
On 17 December 2024, the National Assembly voted on changes to the constituencies. As a result, the number of electoral districts in Budapest decreased from 18 to 16, while in Pest County the number of districts increased from 12 to 14. Border changes in some parts of Csongrád-Csanád County and Fejér County also happened. The ruling Fidesz–KDNP made the decision citing demographic changes in the 2022 census. According to the opposition, the real goal was to weaken their position in the constituencies, mainly capital ones, where they were previously elected directly. The changes were accused of amounting to gerrymandering, with the opposition Tisza Party needing to win by around 3–5 points in the national vote in order to get a majority in the Assembly.

==== Abolished constituencies ====
- Budapest 17th constituency
- Budapest 18th constituency

==== New constituencies ====
- Pest County 13th constituency
- Pest County 14th constituency

== Electoral system ==
Hungarian constituency map

The 199 members of the National Assembly were elected by mixed-member majoritarian representation; 106 elected in single-member constituencies by first-past-the-post voting, while the other 93 elected from nationwide party lists by modified proportional representation. The electoral threshold is set at 5% for single party lists, 10% for joint lists of two parties and 15% for joint lists of three or more parties. Since 2014, each of the Armenian, Bulgarian, Croatian, German, Greek, Polish, Romani, Romanian, Rusyn, Serbian, Slovak, Slovenian, and Ukrainian ethnic minorities can win one of the 93 party lists seats if they register as a specific list and reach a lowered quota of $\frac{1}{4 \times 93}=\frac{1}{372}$ of the sum of party list votes and unused constituency votes of parties passing the electoral threshold, together with the votes cast for national minority lists. Each minority is able to send a minority spokesman – without the rights of an MP – to the National Assembly, if the list does not reach this lowered quota. Due to internal disputes, the National Self-Government of Serbs did not participate in the election. Fractional votes, calculated as all the votes of individual candidates not elected (but associated with a party list over the threshold), as well as surplus votes cast for successful candidates (margin of victory minus 1 vote), are added to the direct lists votes of the respective parties or alliances. Seats are then allocated using the D'Hondt method.

== Contesting parties and candidates ==
A national list can be submitted by a party with an individual candidate in 71 constituencies, at least 14 counties, and Budapest.

Party/Coalition Full name		Ideology	Leader(s)	2022 result	Individual candidates	Candidates of national lists
Fidesz–KDNP	Fidesz; Fidesz – Hungarian Civic Alliance	Christian nationalism Illiberalism; Authoritarianism	Viktor Orbán	117 / 199	106	279
Fidesz–KDNP	KDNP; Christian Democratic People's Party	Christian right	Zsolt Semjén	18 / 199	106	279
MH; Our Homeland Movement		Ultranationalism; Neo-fascism; Hard Euroscepticism	László Toroczkai	6 / 199	106	240
TISZA; Respect and Freedom Party		Conservatism; Populism; Pro-Europeanism	Péter Magyar	Did not contest	106	185
DK; Democratic Coalition		Social liberalism Pro-Europeanism; Third Way	Klára Dobrev	15 / 199 United for Hungary	100	108
MKKP; Hungarian Two Tailed Dog Party		Anti-establishment; Political satire	Gergely Kovács; Zsuzsanna Döme	0 / 199	75	63
MMP–SZOLIDARITÁS	MMP; Hungarian Workers' Party	Communism; Left-wing nationalism Kádárism	Gyula Thürmer	0 / 199 Leftist Alliance	59	
MMP–SZOLIDARITÁS	SZOLIDARITÁS; Hungarian Solidarity Movement	Democratic socialism	Sándor Székely	Did not contest	59	
Jobbik; Movement for a Better Hungary		Conservatism; Hungarian nationalism	Béla Adorján	10 / 199 United for Hungary	40	
NÉP; Party of Normal Life		Anti-establishment; Vaccine hesitancy	György Gődény	0 / 199	6	
KÁP; Party of the Centre		Centrism	Kornél Mihály Vörös	Did not contest	5	
NEEM; National Unification Movement for the Countries of the Holy Crown		Pseudo-historical nationalism	Gábor Bene	Did not contest	2	
LMP (Note: Party co-leader Katalin Szabó-Kellner ran as an individual candidate in Budapest 16th constituency, but the party did not attempt to set up a list nor run any other candidates.); LMP – Hungary's Green Party		Green liberalism Syncretic politics	Péter Ungár; Katalin Szabó-Kellner	6 / 199 United for Hungary	1	
MIÉP; Hungarian Justice and Life Party		Hungarian irredentism	–	Did not contest	1	
Irány; Direction – The Future Party		Centrism; Liberal democracy	Dezső Farkas	Did not exist	1	

=== Independents ===
A total of 31 independent candidates contested the elections.

List
- Piroska Judit Bagdi
- Sarolta Baloghné Rusznyák
- Miklós Bereczki
- Erika Burai
- Antal Csárdi
- Zoltán Daróczi
- András Dohány
- Anna Dohányné Varró
- Norbert Gerencsér
- Ákos Hadházy
- István Hiller
- Sándor Jancsek
- Demien Jelinek
- Tibor Koltai
- Mihály Kőszegi
- Milán Lajos
- Attila Lakatos
- Szilárd Leitner
- Péter Magyar
- Géza Mészáros
- Ádám Mirkóczki
- Imre Nagy
- Károly Németh
- Szilveszter Németh
- Ferenc Pintér
- Domonkos Samu
- György Simonka
- Tibor Szanyi
- Jenő Turó
- Richárd Túró
- Csongor Vékony

=== Parties withdrawing from the election ===
Party Full name	Ideology	Leader(s)	2022 result	Announced withdrawal
MMN Everybody's Hungary People's Party	Liberal conservatism	Péter Márki-Zay	Did not exist	31 May 2025
Momentum Momentum Movement	Liberalism	Márton Tompos (at withdrawal)	10 / 199 United for Hungary	7 June 2025
MEMO Solution Movement	Digitalization	György Gattyán	0 / 199	15 January 2026
2RK Second Reform Era Party	Centrism	Gábor Vona	Did not exist	17 January 2026
LMP LMP – Hungary's Green Party	Green politics	Péter Ungár Katalin Szabó-Kellner	6 / 199 United for Hungary	17 January 2026
Dialogue Dialogue – The Greens' Party	Green liberalism	Rebeka Szabó Richárd Barabás	5 / 199 United for Hungary	7 February 2026
MSZP Hungarian Socialist Party	Social democracy	Imre Komjáthi	10 / 199 United for Hungary	20 February 2026

=== Individual MPs not standing for re-election ===
Name	Constituency	Party	Reason	Member since	Ref.
András Aradszki	Érd	KDNP	Retiring	2010	
György Czerván	Nagykáta	Fidesz	Retiring	1998	
Sándor Farkas	Szentes	Fidesz	Only on list	1998	
Miklós Hajnal	Budapest XII	Momentum	Retiring	2022	
Csaba Hende	Szombathely	Fidesz	Resignation (Note: Csaba Hende served as MP for Szombathely until May 2025, when he was elected a member of the Constitutional Court of Hungary, and thus he resigned from his parliamentary seat. His seat was replaced from the party list because the resignation occurred less than a year before the election.)	2002	
Tamás Herczeg	Békéscsaba	Fidesz	Retiring	2018	
Dezső Hiszékeny	Budapest XIII	MSZP	Retiring	2014	
Richárd Hörcsik	Sátoraljaújhely	Fidesz	Retiring	1998	
András Jámbor	Budapest VIII	Dialogue	Retiring	2022	
Mária Kállai	Szolnok	Fidesz	Only on list	2018	
Ákos Kara	Győr	Fidesz	Only on list	2010	
János Kiss	Miskolc	Fidesz	Retiring	2022	
Károly Kontrát	Balatonfüred	Fidesz	Only on list	2002	
Lajos Kósa	Debrecen	Fidesz	Only on list	1990	
József Kovács	Gyula	Fidesz	Retiring	2010	
Zoltán Kovács	Pápa	Fidesz	Resignation (Note: Zoltán Kovács served as MP for Pápa until May 2025, when he was elected a member of the Supervisory Board of the Hungarian National Bank, and thus he resigned from his parliamentary seat. His seat was replaced from the party list because the resignation occurred less than a year before the election.)	1998	
Ágnes Kunhalmi	Budapest XVIII	MSZP	Withdrew (Note: In favour of Tisza Party)	2014	
János Lázár	Hódmezővásárhely	Fidesz	Only on list	2002	
Tamás Mellár	Pécs	Dialogue	Retiring	2018	
Lajos Oláh	Budapest VI	DK	Only on list	2006	
Anna Orosz	Budapest XI	Momentum	Resignation (Note: Anna Orosz served as MP for 11th District of Budapest until May 2025, when she left politics for personal reasons, and thus she resigned from his parliamentary seat. Her seat was replaced from the party list because the resignation occurred less than a year before the election.)	2022	
Károly Pánczél	Dabas	Fidesz	Retiring	1998	
László Pósán	Debrecen	Fidesz	Only on list	1998	
Gábor Riz	Ózd	Fidesz	Retiring	2010	
Róbert Balázs Simon	Győr	Fidesz	Retiring	2014	
Sándor Szabó	Szeged	MSZP	Withdrew	2014	
Szabolcs Szabó	Budapest XXI	Momentum	Withdrew	2014	
Tímea Szabó	Budapest III	Dialogue	Withdrew	2010	
Tünde Szabó	Nyíregyháza	Fidesz	Only on list	2018	
László Szászfalvi	Barcs	KDNP	Retiring	1998	
Gyula Tamás Szeberényi	Kecskemét	Fidesz	Retiring	2022	
László Tasó	Debrecen	Fidesz	Only on list	2004	
István Tiba	Hajdúböszörmény	Fidesz	Only on list	2008	
Bence Tordai	Budapest II	Dialogue	Withdrew	2018	
Endre Tóth	Budapest XXII	Momentum	Retiring	2022	
Zoltán Vajda	Budapest XVI	MSZP	Withdrew	2022	
László Vécsey	Gödöllő	Fidesz	Retiring	2010	
László Vigh	Zalaegerszeg	Fidesz	Retiring	2006	

== Endorsements ==
Viktor Orbán (Fidesz–KDNP)

Heads of state and government

- Donald Trump, president of the United States
- Vladimir Putin, president of Russia
- Javier Milei, president of Argentina
- José Antonio Kast, president of Chile
- Santiago Peña, president of Paraguay
- Andrej Babiš, prime minister of the Czech Republic
- Irakli Kobakhidze, prime minister of Georgia
- Benjamin Netanyahu, prime minister of Israel
- Giorgia Meloni, prime minister of Italy
- Hristijan Mickoski, prime minister of North Macedonia
- Aleksandar Vučić, president of Serbia
- Robert Fico, prime minister of Slovakia
- Václav Klaus, former president of the Czech Republic
- Pál Schmitt, former president of Hungary
- János Áder, former president of Hungary
- Tony Abbott, former prime minister of Australia

Executive branch officials

- Petr Macinka, minister of foreign affairs of the Czech Republic
- Matteo Salvini, deputy prime minister of Italy
- JD Vance, vice president of the United States
- Marco Rubio, United States secretary of state
- Judit Varga, former minister of justice of Hungary

Deputies

- Tomasz Froelich, MEP
- Beata Szydło, MEP

Party leaders

- Santiago Abascal, president of Patriots.eu (EU) and Vox (Spain)
- Mateusz Morawiecki, leader of the ECR Party (EU)
- George Simion, vice-president of the ECR Party (EU) and leader of AUR (Romania)
- Afroditi Latinopoulou, president of Voice of Reason (Greece)
- Jordan Bardella, president of the National Rally (France)
- Marine Le Pen, parliamentary group leader of the National Rally (France)
- Alice Weidel, co-leader of the AfD (Germany)
- Miloš Vučević, president of the SNS (Serbia)
- Geert Wilders, chair of the PVV (Netherlands)
- Jarosław Kaczyński, chairman of Law and Justice (Poland)
- Herbert Kickl, chair of the FPÖ (Austria)
- Christian Hafenecker, secretary-general of the FPÖ (Austria)
- Remigijus Žemaitaitis, chairman of Dawn of Nemunas (Lithuania)
- Milorad Dodik, leader of the SNSD (Bosnia and Herzegovina)
- Igor Dodon, leader of the PSRM (Moldova)
- Martin Helme, leader of the Conservative People's Party (Estonia)
- Ainārs Šlesers, chairperson of Latvia First (Latvia)
- André Ventura, leader of Chega (Portugal)
- Tom Van Grieken, leader of VB (Belgium)
- Krzysztof Bosak, chairman of the National Movement (Poland)
- Vladimir Gajić, chair of People's Party (Serbia)
- Hunor Kelemen, president of the RMDSZ (Romania)
- Bálint Pásztor, leader of the VMSZ (Serbia)
- Tamás Sneider, former president of Jobbik (in constituencies, also endorsed MH on party list)

Political parties

- Patriots.eu
- ECR Party
- Europe of Sovereign Nations (also endorsed MH)
- Brothers of Italy (Italy)
- Law and Justice (Poland)
- Alliance of Vojvodina Hungarians (Serbia)
- Democratic Party of Vojvodina Hungarians (Serbia)
- Democratic Union of Hungarians in Romania (Romania)
- Hungarian Alliance of Transylvania (Romania)
- Hungarian Alliance (Slovakia)
- Party of Hungarians of Ukraine (Ukraine)

Organisations

- Hungarian National Council of Transylvania
- New York Young Republican Club
- Szekler National Council

Activists and commentators

- Matt Schlapp, chairman of the American Conservative Union
- Eva Vlaardingerbroek, political commentator and activist
- Donald Trump Jr., American businessman and political activist
- György Budaházy, political activist (in constituencies, also endorsed MH on party list)

Notable individuals

- Emir Kusturica, film director
- Rob Schneider, actor and comedian
- Sarolta Zalatnay, singer
- László Bölöni, football manager and former player
- Feró Nagy, singer and musician
- Joci Pápai, singer
- Gabi Tóth, singer, dancer, and television personality
- Ferenc Demjén, singer
- Heni Dér, singer
- Gergő Oláh, singer
- Gigi Radics, singer and media personality
- Réka Rubint, fitness instructor
- Enikő Muri, actress and singer
- Katalin Makray, Olympic medalist gymnast and former first lady of Hungary
- Erika Miklósa, opera singer
- Gábor Kucsera, sprint canoeist
- Szabina Tápai, handballer
- Tamás Varga, Olympic champion water polo player
- Attila Czene, Olympic champion swimmer
- Edina Kulcsár, model and beauty queen
- Sándor Bárdosi, Olympic medalist wrestler and mixed martial artist
- Gábor Reviczky, actor
- Attila Széki, singer, rapper, and retired footballer
Péter Magyar (TISZA)

Heads of state and government

- Donald Tusk, prime minister of Poland

International officials

- Nicu Ștefănuță, vice-president of the European Parliament
- Péter Balázs, former European commissioner for regional policy
- Miklós Haraszti, former representative of the OSCE Representative on Freedom of the Media

Executive branch officials

- Géza Jeszenszky, former minister of foreign affairs of Hungary
- Péter Ákos Bod, former minister of industry and trade of Hungary
- Bálint Magyar, former minister of education of Hungary
- Ferenc Juhász, former minister of defence of Hungary
- Pál Vastagh, former minister of justice of Hungary
- Péter Bárándy, former minister of justice of Hungary
- Mónika Lamperth, former minister of the interior of Hungary
- Kinga Göncz, former minister of foreign affairs of Hungary
- Imre Szabó, former minister of environment and water of Hungary
- Zoltán Varga, former minister of local government of Hungary
- Béla Pál, former secretary of state
- Zoltán Gőgös, former secretary of state
- István Szent-Iványi, former secretary of state
- Henrik Havas, former spokesman of the government of Hungary
- Gábor Borókai, former spokesman of the government of Hungary

Deputies

- Daniel Freund, MEP
- Chloé Ridel, MEP
- Tineke Strik, MEP
- Riho Terras, MEP
- István Hiller, member of the National Assembly (on party list)
- Zsuzsanna Szelényi, former member of the National Assembly

Local officials

- Gergely Karácsony, mayor of Budapest
- László Kiss, mayor of 3rd District of Budapest
- Péter Márki-Zay, mayor of Hódmezővásárhely
- László Botka, mayor of Szeged
- Dávid Vitézy, member of the General Assembly of Budapest
- Gábor Demszky, former mayor of Budapest
- Judit Csabai, former mayor of Nyíregyháza

Party leaders

- Manfred Weber, president of the EPP (EU)
- Sandro Gozi, secretary-general of the EDP (EU)
- Terry Reintke, co-leader of the Greens/EFA (EU)
- Urmas Reinsalu, leader of Isamaa (Estonia)
- Anna Öreg, vice-president of the PSG (Serbia)
- Bertalan Tóth, parliamentary group leader of the Hungarian Socialist Party
- Ildikó Lendvai, former president of Hungarian Socialist Party
- Benedek Jávor former co-leader of the Dialogue – The Greens' Party
- András Fekete-Győr, former leader of Momentum Movement

Political parties

- European People's Party
- Isamaa (Estonia)
- Movement of Free Citizens (Serbia)
- Everybody's Hungary People's Party
- Momentum Movement
- Solution Movement
- Second Reform Era Party
- LMP – Hungary's Green Party
- Hungarian Socialist Party
- Hungarian Two-Tailed Dog Party (in constituencies)
- Jobbik (in some constituencies)
- Democratic Coalition (in some constituencies)

Notable individuals

- Mark Ruffalo, actor and producer
- Tamás Jordán, actor
- Gábor Bojár, entrepreneur
- Caramel, singer and musician
- Róbert Puzsér, publicist, editor, and social critic
- János Bródy, singer, songwriter, and composer
- Ági Pataki, model and film producer
- Alexandra Borbély, actress
- Ibolya Oláh, singer
- Gábor Zacher, physician
- Zsuzsa Koncz, singer
- János Gálvölgyi, actor and comedian
- Gábor Herendi, film director
- Róbert Alföldi, actor, director, and television host
László Toroczkai (MH)

Party leaders

- László Rác Szabó, leader of Hungarian Civic Alliance
- Tamás Sneider, former president of Jobbik (on party list, also endorsed Fidesz–KDNP in constituencies)

Political parties

- Europe of Sovereign Nations (also endorsed Fidesz–KDNP)
- Hungarian Civic Alliance

Organisations

- Sixty-Four Counties Youth Movement

Activists and commentators

- György Budaházy, political activist (on party list, also endorsed Fidesz–KDNP in constituencies)
Klára Dobrev (DK)

Heads of state and government

- Ferenc Gyurcsány, former prime minister of Hungary

Executive branch officials

- Gábor Kuncze, former minister of the interior of Hungary

Party leaders

- Stefan Löfven, president of the Party of European Socialists

Political parties

- Party of European Socialists
Dávid Nagy (MKKP) (Note: As lead candidate)

Local officials

- Tamás Soproni, mayor of 6th District of Budapest (on party list)
Gyula Thürmer and Sándor Székely (MMP–SZOLIDARITÁS)

Party leaders

- András Schiffer, former co-president of the LMP – Hungary's Green Party

== Campaign ==
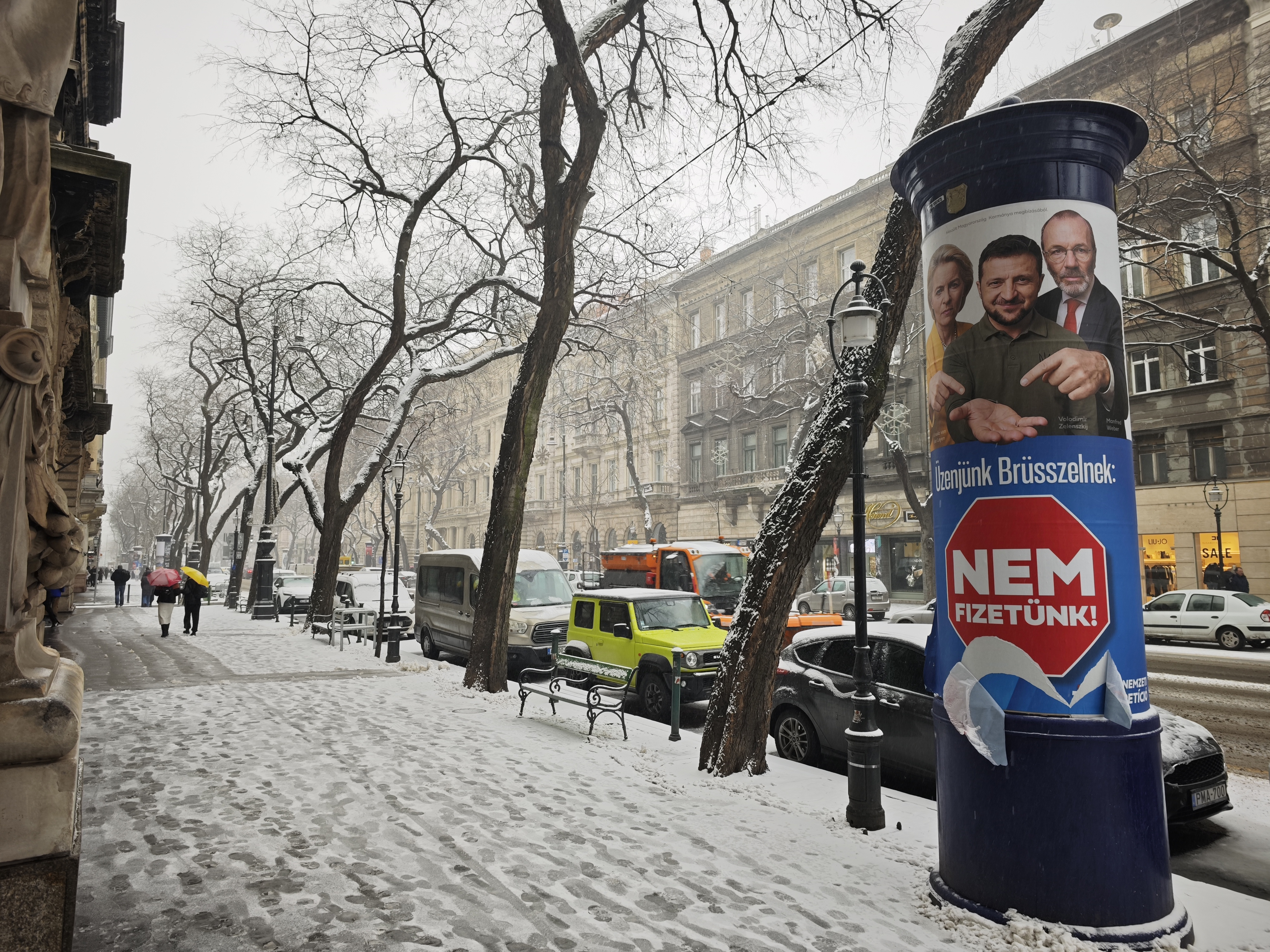
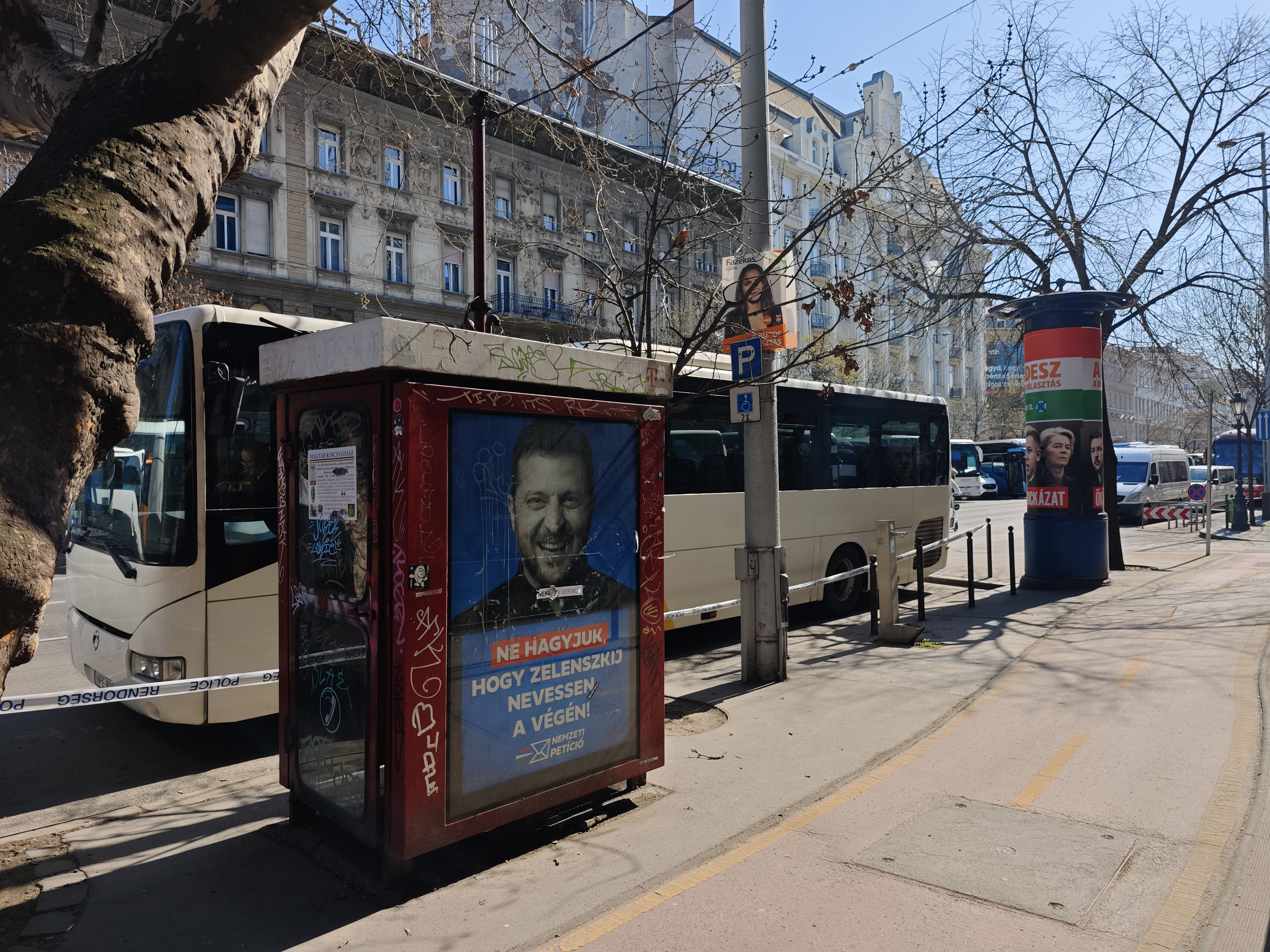
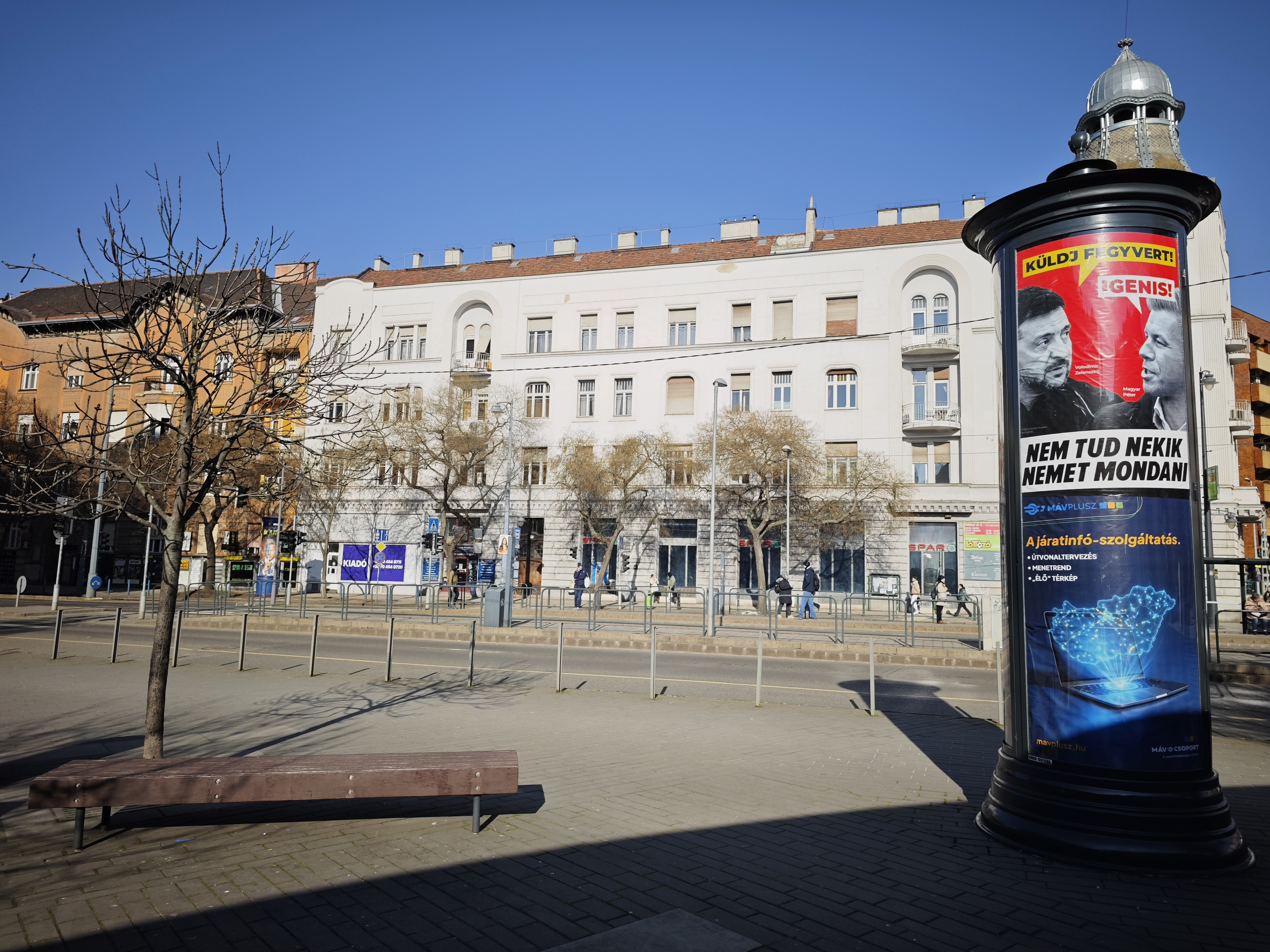
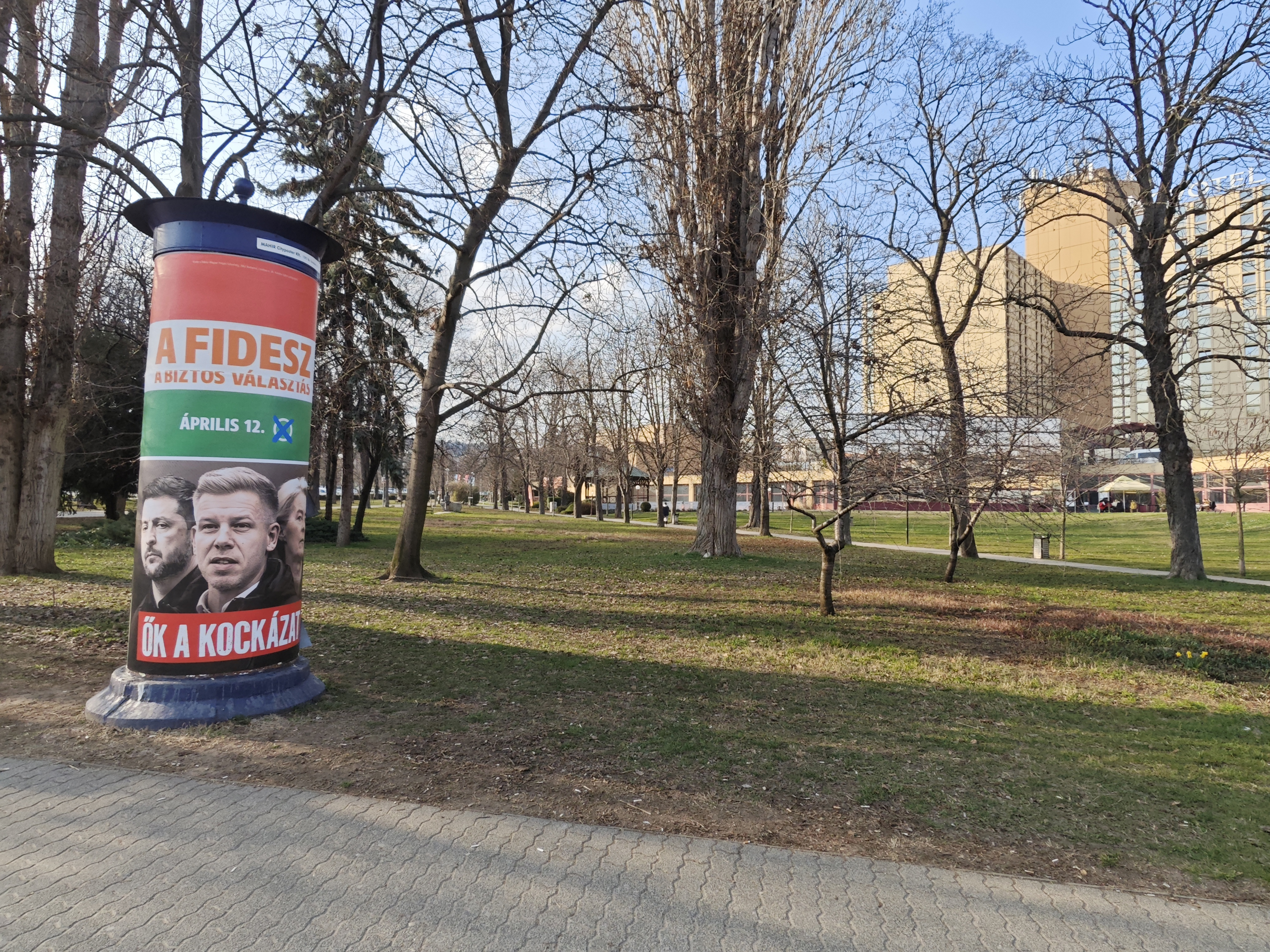
Posters and billboards nationwide have accused opposition and European politicians – such as Péter Magyar, Ursula von der Leyen, Volodymyr Zelenskyy, and Manfred Weber – of dragging Hungary into war by sending weapons and troops, while Fidesz is depicted as the only option for peace.

During the election campaign, the Druzhba pipeline crisis happened. The Orbán government and Slovakia accused Ukrainian authorities of deliberately delaying repairs for political reasons. Zelenskyy said he would prefer not to repair the Druzhba oil pipeline, stating that his position is "shared with European leaders."

In February 2026, Telex published an article detailing the Samsung SDI battery factory's occupational safety deficiencies in Göd, such as personnel breathing toxic, carcinogenic heavy metals, sometimes hundreds of times above legal limits. Further reports showed how the factory emitted tons of toxic NMP into the air, and a mixture of toxic substances coming out of its vents. Orbán claimed that the opposition was lying to mislead the people, and that pollution from the factory exceeding legal limits was never measured. Parliamentary State Secretary Csaba Latorcai stated that the government strictly penalised the factory when pollution occurred inside the plant, and no pollution was detected that would have had any impact outside the factory.

On 6 March, two cash transport vehicles with Ukrainian license plates were intercepted by the Counter Terrorism Centre (TEK) near Budapest. The transported money and gold were seized by the National Tax and Customs Administration (NAV), and its seven workers were detained, later deported. During their detention, they were denied legal assistance and consular support. On the same day, the NAV started criminal proceedings on suspicion of money laundering in the case. The government claimed that the legal status of the seized assets could not be verified, while Oschadbank and Raiffeisen claimed that this was a documented, legal transfer of funds from Austria to Kyiv. Shipments like this had been done on a weekly basis, with the cooperation of the police and NAV. Ukraine stated that this operation was hostage-taking and robbery. Lóránt Horváth, the attorney of the detained workers, said that – contrary to what the official report stated – only the TEK was present at the interception, the NAV only arrived later. He said that TEK agents shouted contradictory commands, while holding the workers at gunpoint. He also said that they were handcuffed for 29 hours. The commander was denied access to his diabetic medication; instead, he was injected with an unknown substance against his will, which resulted in him ending up in a life-threatening condition and losing consciousness. The Guardian claimed that the substance was a relaxant, meant to make him more "talkative" during the interrogation.

Starting March, Orbán announced his nationwide election rallies that would be open to everyone, unlike his past events. Telex observed a coordinated group of dozens of people who regularly appeared at these rallies. They reacted quickly when dissenting opinions were expressed: when people chanted "Filthy Fidesz" (Mocskos Fidesz), they started pro-Fidesz chants, and when someone held up a critical banner, they held up government-supporting ones. They also stood in front of or surrounded protesters, with the goal of intimidation. During later rallies, they ripped out protesters' banners and pushed them, and physically blocked the street leading to the event's location.

During a 15 March demonstration in memory of the Hungarian Revolution of 1848, Magyar accused Orbán of "treason" and inviting Russian agents to interfere in the election to Fidesz–KDNP advantage. During the same demonstration, individuals close to Fidesz – including minors – ran into the crowd and held up a massive Ukrainian flag. Photographers appeared on a nearby balcony and within the crowd who documented the incident, after which the individuals and photographers left. According to 444, this was coordinated by members of the Fidesz-affiliated Digital Democracy Development Agency. Numerous pro-government media outlets quickly reported on it, stating that this was expected from a Tisza event, while the Hungarian flag dominated Fidesz's parade. Fidesz politicians also posted about it on social media; these posts were liked by thousands of evidently fake profiles.

The Conservative Political Action Conference (CPAC) Hungary meeting had been connected to the campaign. On 21 March 2026, The Washington Post reported that Russia's Foreign Intelligence Service (SVR) proposed staging a false flag assassination attempt on Orbán in an attempt to improve his odds to win the election, according to an SVR internal report that was obtained and authenticated by a European intelligence service. On 26 March, Politico Europe reported that a Russian bot network had made social media posts promoting a narrative that Orbán would face an assassination attempt and presenting Ukraine and Zelenskyy as a threat to Orbán. During the same period, The Insider released a recording of a phone call between foreign ministers Péter Szijjártó and Sergey Lavrov from August 2024, where Lavrov reminded him to ask for Gulbahor Ismailova, the sister of Alisher Usmanov, to be removed from the list of persons under European Union sanctions. In another call, he allegedly told Lavrov "I am always at your disposal." Szijjártó also appeared to offer to send Lavrov a document about Ukraine's European Union accession. Poland and Ireland referred to the apparent leaked audio as ″repulsive″ and ″sinister″.

On 26 March, the documentary film The Price of the Vote was released in Hungary detailing a six-month investigation by independent filmmakers and reporters, which alleged that Fidesz was engaging in a campaign of mass voter intimidation in poor rural or small-town communities prior to the election that have been Fidesz strongholds since 2010. In the film, it was alleged that local Fidesz mayors in such communities offer cash, work, firewood, transport to polling stations, access to medicine, and synthetic drugs in exchange for "correct" votes. In the film, it was also stated that an opposition candidate had dropped his bid to office after a child protection office in a Fidesz-ran area allegedly threatened to take his children into care.

Throughout the campaign, there were several attacks against Magyar and Tisza Party, such as accusations of being a puppet of Brussels and Kyiv portrayed by comic book, publishing of parts of Magyar's sexual life, or candidates with same name as official Tisza Party candidates in the same electoral districts were all topics of the campaign. On 6 April, Serbian police found approximately 4 kg (8.8 lb) of explosives at the TurkStream gas pipeline. This incident was quickly used by Orbán and Szijjártó in order to blame Ukraine for alleged attempts to cut Russian energy supplies to Hungary and Slovakia. Magyar quickly replied that this was a false flag operation, in order to delay the election due to Fidesz's insufficient polling results. Serbian intelligence chief Đuro Jovanić said that Ukraine was not involved in the explosives plot. US Vice President JD Vance visited Hungary on 7 April, holding a press conference and attending a rally with Orbán.

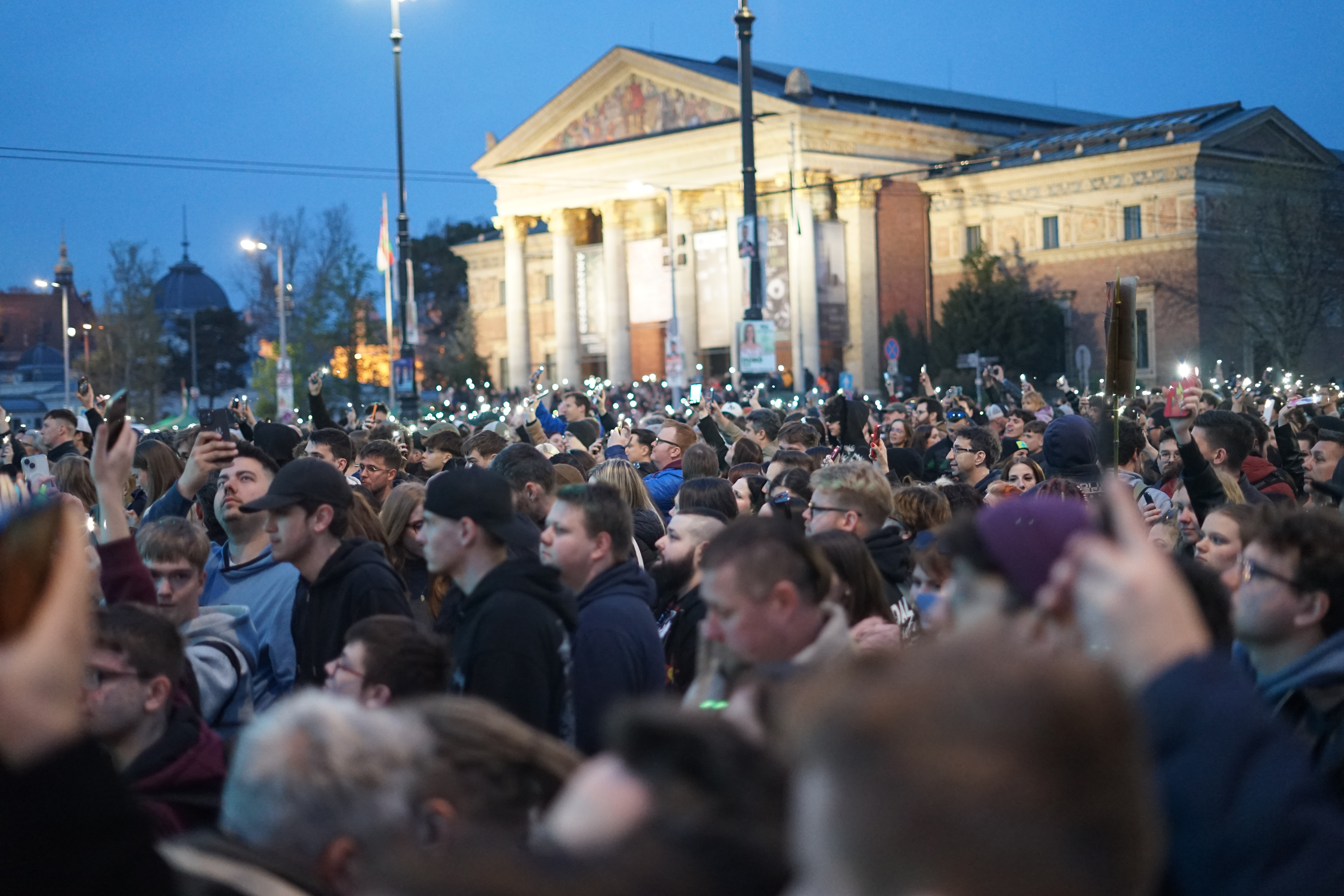
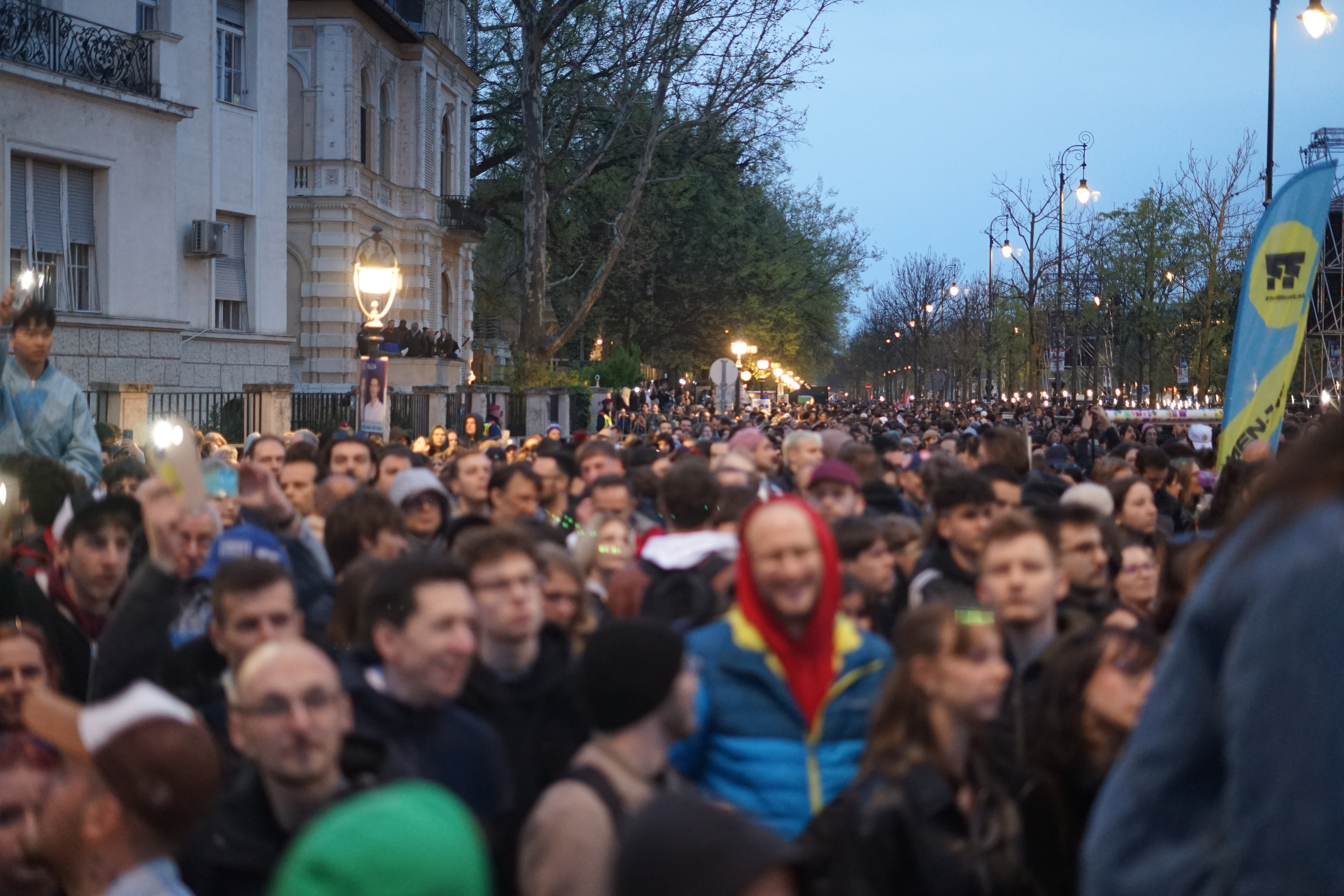
Crowd at the 10 April Rendszerbontó Nagykoncert

On 10 April, the Rendszerbontó Nagykoncert (lit. 'System-demolishing Grand Concert') was organised by Róbert Puzsér's Civil Resistance (Polgári Ellenállás) movement at Heroes' Square, financed by donations. By 17:30, the square was full, with the crowd stretching all the way to Kodály körönd, chanting "Filthy Fidesz" (Mocskos Fidesz) and "Russians, go home!" (Ruszkik, haza!; from the 1956 revolution). Among the fifty performers were Beton.Hofi, Krúbi, and Azahriah, with each of them performing one of their government-critical songs. Speeches were given by Puzsér, Bence Szabó, and Szilveszter Pálinkás.

=== Series of interviews ===
The final weeks of the campaign were characterized by a series of interviews published in independent media, with various representatives of the state sphere seeking to expose the nepotism, corruption and dysfunctionality of the state run by Fidesz. On 25 March, the Direkt36 interview of Bence Szabó, a police officer in the unit investigating child pornography crimes, was published, which was recorded in February. The Constitution Protection Office (AH) pressured the National Bureau of Investigation (NNI) to search through two men's homes – 38-year-old "Buddha" and 19-year-old "Gundalf" –, after receiving an anonymous tip suspecting child pornography. They were IT specialists of the Tisza Party, and no trace of child pornography was found on their seized devices; instead, hundreds of screenshots were found detailing a political conspiracy operation aimed at bringing Tisza down. In the interview, Szabó detailed how the story looked from the perspective of police officers, including the unusual intelligence agency interventions and the recruitment operation against Tisza. He said that the AH took the data from them without the necessary paperwork, and he confirmed that Magyar's ex-girlfriend, Evelin Vogel, was also a member of the team working against Tisza. Szabó claimed that a secret service group was obviously behind the operation against Tisza. After the Direkt36 article's publication, the police searched Szabó's apartment, interrogated him, and initiated proceedings against him for abuse of office. At the same time as Szabó was charged, Direkt36 published his interview. Government propaganda portrayed the two IT specialists as Ukrainian spies, while oppositional figures declared Gundalf and Szabó heroes.

According to the screenshots found, the former IT specialist of Tisza, Dániel "Gundalf" Hrabóczki, was contacted by V. E. (who later appears as "Henry"), who tried to persuade him into granting him access to Tisza's IT infrastructure in order to bring that down, but Gundalf declined and reported this to his colleague. They had a belt with a hidden camera, with the intention of busting the recruiter, but police seized it and charged them with unlawful use of military equipment. On 28 March, the government posted a video of the AH's hearing of Gundalf after the raid. The government and Orbán claimed that he admitted to having been recruited by Ukrainians, despite the fact that he made no such statement. On the 30th, Gundalf gave an interview to 444, saying that he intentionally misled the agents during the AH's hearing. He justified this by claiming he received messages from an unknown "Theo", who said the AH was interfering with the proceedings against them and the AH itself organised the whole case, aligning with what Szabó said.

On 2 April, an interview on Telex was published with Hungarian Army Captain Szilveszter Pálinkás, who sharply criticized the Orbán government's defense policy. He said that he had attended Royal Military Academy Sandhurst in 2020 with the prime minister's son, Gáspár Orbán, who entered without a selection process. Orbán allegedly told him that he had a "divine inspiration" to help African Christians. After their return home, Orbán was given "an office in the Carmelite"; as a first lieutenant, he began planning the Hungarian Army's mission to Chad. According to Orbán, he also expected 50% military losses in connection with the mission. According to defence minister Kristóf Szalay-Bobrovniczky, the statement was made with political intent, and he wrote that "the Hungarian Defence Forces is an institution independent of party politics, and will remain so." He later denied that there was a Chadian mission, even though Szalay-Bobrovniczky himself had made several statements about it years earlier and the legislature had voted on it. On 7 April, Pálinkás claimed in another interview that Szalay-Bobrovniczky made three offers to keep him quiet, which he all declined: a four-year military assignment in New York, appointing him as the commander of a newly created military organisation, and work in filmmaking.

== Conduct ==
Vote counting was described as free and fair by observers. Magyar called the election "a celebration of democracy" in his victory speech, and Orbán conceded the election.

=== Fraud accusations before election ===
Some observers voiced concerns about potential vote rigging by the ruling Fidesz–KDNP government and election interference from other authoritarian countries that support it, with 79% of Hungarians fearing foreign interference in the election according to a Publicus Institute poll. A late March 2026 poll by the independent pollster Medián had similarly showed that the majority of voters from both major parties believed that the opposing party would commit electoral fraud. Orbán supporters were alleging fraud before the elections. Opposition leader Magyar's Tisza party had made available its own system for voters to report fraud. Fidesz followed suit by enabling a hotline and a dedicated email address. Fidesz MEP Csaba Dömötör accused the opposition of fraud before saying: "They cry fraud but they are the ones committing it." Magyar said that he would accept the results before the elections as long as there is no serious electoral fraud, urging voters to report any irregularities they see.

=== Russia ===
According to The Washington Post, the Foreign Intelligence Service of Russia considered staging a fake failed assassination attempt against Orbán to boost his popular support. In March 2026, investigative outlet VSquare reported that the Russian military intelligence service (GRU) had deployed a team of "political technologists" to the Russian embassy in Budapest to assist Orbán's re-election campaign. The report, citing European national security sources, claimed the operation was modelled on previous Russian interference campaigns in Moldova. Following these reports, a group of Members of the European Parliament, including Tineke Strik, Michał Wawrykiewicz, and Sophie Wilmès, submitted a priority question to the European Commission. They requested a formal assessment of whether the Hungarian government's alleged facilitation of such interference violated the democratic principles enshrined in Article 2 of the Treaty on European Union.

On 8 April 2026, a consortium of investigative journalists published transcripts of calls between Foreign Minister Péter Szijjártó and Russian officials. The leaks suggested that Budapest acted as a fifth column within the EU, with Szijjártó allegedly coordinating with Moscow to weaken sanctions and sharing information on Ukraine's EU accession process. These disclosures prompted the European Union to demand an urgent explanation from Budapest. The timing of the leak, occurring 72 hours before the national vote, became a central theme in the final days of the opposition's campaign, which used it to argue that the Orbán government had compromised national sovereignty.

On 10 April 2026, two days before the election, research published by digital forensics experts and reported by Reuters identified a coordinated influence operation on Telegram. The research indicated that dozens of channels, previously used to spread Kremlin-aligned narratives regarding the war in Ukraine, simultaneously shifted focus to the Hungarian election. The operation promoted pro-Fidesz narratives while accusing the opposition of being "warmongers" who would drag Hungary into a conflict with Russia. Analysts noted that the timing and messaging of the posts were highly synchronized, suggesting a "bot farm" or a centralized command structure. These findings echoed earlier warnings from MEPs regarding the presence of Russian "political technologists" operating out of the Russian embassy in Budapest.

=== Ukraine ===
The Hungarian government accused the Ukrainian government of interfering in the elections, and Magyar and his Tisza Party of attempting to involve Hungary in the Russo-Ukrainian war. Volodymyr Zelenskyy, the president of Ukraine, stated that he hoped that a certain person (presumed to be Orbán) would not veto a European Union loan for Ukraine, otherwise he would "simply give the address of that person to our Armed Forces — our guys can call him and speak to him in their own language." This comment was condemned by Magyar, the European Commission, and António Costa (the president of the European Council).

=== Media access ===
After the election, Magyar claimed that he had been blocked from appearing on public service television or radio since September 2024.

== Opinion polls ==
=== Total ===
The following graph presents the average of all polls.

=== By affiliation ===
The following two graphs present only the polls that are government-aligned or independent/opposition-aligned, respectively.

Government-aligned polls

Independent and opposition-aligned polls

== Results ==
Voting was held on 12 April 2026, and ran from 6:00 to 19:00 CEST. At 79.6%, it recorded a significant increase in turnout compared to 2022 and set by a large margin the turnout record since the 1990 Hungarian parliamentary election, which were the first free elections since 1945, overtaking the 2002 Hungarian parliamentary election that ended Orbán's first term as Prime Minister. It had the highest turnout since the 1985 Hungarian parliamentary election, the last election held under the Communist regime of the Hungarian People's Republic, and the results were described as "Hungary's most consequential" since the fall of Communism (rendszerváltás) in 1989. Tisza Party swept Fidesz from power in a landslide victory. Most independent polling since 2024 showed Tisza Party with a clear lead, a margin reflected in the final results. In contrast, pro-government pollsters projected a fifth term for Fidesz. On election night, with the result beyond doubt, Orbán conceded the election.

With all precincts counted, Tisza Party secured 141 seats in the 199-seat National Assembly on 53.2% of the vote, enough for a two-thirds supermajority that would allow it to amend the constitution without the need for support from other parties. While a party or alliance only needs a simple majority of 100 seats to conduct the ordinary business of government, a supermajority of 133 seats is required to change the constitution, a rule enacted by the Orbán government's 2011 constitution. In terms of percentage of the National Assembly controlled, it is the largest mandate that a Hungarian party has ever won in a free election. Fidesz's seat count was more than halved, dropping to 52 seats on 38.6% of the votes. Our Homeland Movement was the only other party projected to have crossed the five percent threshold for parliamentary representation, they secured 6 seats, which is the same number as the last time they got it. Tisza Party was assured of 138 seats in preliminary results. However, as the final votes were counted, including votes of the Hungarian diaspora, Tisza rose to 141 seats, while Fidesz's seat count dropped from 55 to 52 despite overwhelmingly leading among the diaspora. Due to the political polarisation between Fidesz and Tisza Party, as well as the high turnout, Hungary's ethnic minorities lost parliamentary representation.

=== Election results ===
Party	Party-list			Constituency			Total seats	+/–
Party	Votes	%	Seats	Votes	%	Seats	Total seats	+/–
Tisza Party	3,385,890	53.18	45	3,333,415	55.26	96	141	New
Fidesz–KDNP	2,458,337	38.61	42	2,215,225	36.72	10	52	–83
Our Homeland Movement	358,372	5.63	6	345,252	5.72	0	6	0
Democratic Coalition	70,298	1.10	0	65,302	1.08	0	0	–15
Hungarian Two Tailed Dog Party	51,965	0.82	0	38,924	0.65	0	0	0
National Roma Self-Government	19,203	0.30	0				0	0
National Self-Government of Germans	18,419	0.29	0				0	–1
National Self-Government of Croats	1,307	0.02	0				0	0
National Self-Government of Slovaks	902	0.01	0				0	0
National Self-Government of Romanians	512	0.01	0				0	0
National Self-Government of Rusyns	440	0.01	0				0	0
National Self-Government of Ukrainians	379	0.01	0				0	0
National Self-Government of Slovenes	179	0.00	0				0	0
National Self-Government of Greeks	159	0.00	0				0	0
National Self-Government of Poles	147	0.00	0				0	0
National Self-Government of Armenians	116	0.00	0				0	0
National Self-Government of Bulgarians	108	0.00	0				0	0
Jobbik				7,832	0.13	0	0	–7
Hungarian Workers' Party–Solidarity Party				4,187	0.07	0	0	0
Party of Normal Life				328	0.01	0	0	0
National Unification Movement				249	0.00	0	0	0
Party of the Centre				247	0.00	0	0	0
Hungarian Justice and Life Party (Note: The party, despite its name, is not similar to the defunct Hungarian Justice and Life Party.)				196	0.00	0	0	0
LMP – Hungary's Green Party				163	0.00	0	0	–3
Direction – The Future Party				109	0.00	0	0	0
Independents				20,967	0.35	0	0	0
Total	6,366,733	100.00	93	6,032,396	100.00	106	199	0
Valid votes	6,366,733	99.41		6,032,396	99.43			
Invalid/blank votes	37,670	0.59		34,327	0.57			
Total votes	6,404,403	100.00		6,066,723	100.00			
Registered voters/turnout	8,112,646	78.94		7,618,472	79.63			
Source: Nemzeti Választási Iroda

Party vote share
TISZA	53.18%
Fidesz–KDNP	38.61%
MHM	5.63%
DK	1.10%
MKKP	0.82%
Minorities	0.66%

Constituency vote share
TISZA	55.26%
Fidesz–KDNP	36.72%
MHM	5.72%
DK	1.08%
MKKP	0.65%
Others	0.57%

Seat share
TISZA	70.85%
Fidesz–KDNP	26.13%
MHM	3.02%

=== List results ===
The following shows the calculation of the list seats after the election. To this end the list votes and fractional votes of each party above the electoral threshold are taken into account, with the 93 seats being distributed using the D'Hondt method. No list of national minorities were able to obtain a seat because they did not fulfill the lowered quota of 1/372 of the votes. In this election, that threshold was 26,712 votes.

Party	List votes	Fractional votes	Total votes	%	Quotients	Seats
TISZA	3,385,890	1,364,783	4,750,673	47.81	45.68	45
Fidesz–KDNP	2,458,337	1,982,535	4,440,872	44.69	42.70	42
MH	358,372	345,252	703,624	7.08	6.77	6
ORÖ	19,203	N/A	19,203	0.19	N/A	0
MNOÖ/LdU	18,419	N/A	18,419	0.19	N/A	0
Other minority lists	4,249	N/A	4,249	0.04	N/A	0
Divisor: 104,000

==== List members ====
List rank	TISZA		Fidesz–KDNP		MH	
List rank	Name	Result	Name	Result	Name	Result
1	Péter Magyar	Elected for Budapest 3	Viktor Orbán	Elected, list seat 1, declined seat	László Toroczkai	Elected, list seat 1
2	Andrea Rost	Elected for Jász-Nagykun-Szolnok 1	Zsolt Semjén	Elected, list seat 2, declined seat	Dóra Dúró	Elected, list seat 2
3	László Gajdos	Elected for Szabolcs-Szatmár-Bereg 1	László Kövér	Elected, list seat 3, declined seat	István Apáti	Elected, list seat 3
4	Ágnes Forsthoffer	Elected for Veszprém 2	Kinga Gál	Elected, list seat 4, declined seat	Előd Novák	Elected, list seat 4
5	István Kapitány	Elected, list seat 1	Alexandra Szentkirályi	Elected, list seat 1	Zsuzsanna Borvendég	Elected, list seat 1, declined seat
6	Anita Orbán	Elected, list seat 2	Gábor Kubatov	Elected, list seat 6, declined seat	Dávid Dócs	Elected, list seat 5
7	Márk Radnai	Elected for Komárom-Esztergom 2	Lajos Kósa	Elected, list seat 7, declined seat	István Szabadi	Selected as replacement candidate, list seat 6
8	Andrea Bujdosó	Elected for Pest 3	Szilárd Németh	Elected, list seat 8, declined seat		
9	Zoltán Tarr	Elected for Budapest 16	Máté Kocsis	Elected, list seat 2		
10	Erzsébet Csézi	Elected for Borsod-Abaúj-Zemplén 7	János Latorcai	Elected, list seat 10, declined seat		
11	Zsolt Hegedűs	Elected, list seat 3	Sándor Lezsák	Elected, list seat 11, declined seat		
12	Kriszta Bódis	Elected for Budapest 2	István Jakab	Elected, list seat 12, declined seat		
13	Gábor Pósfai	Elected for Pest 2	Zsolt Papp	Elected, list seat 3		
14	Zoltán Tanács	Elected for Budapest 1	István Mohácsy	Elected, list seat 14, declined seat		
15	Éva Göröghné Bocskai	Elected for Hajdú-Bihar 6	Attila Sztojka	Elected, list seat 15, declined seat		
16	Romulusz Ruszin-Szendi	Elected for Hajdú-Bihar 5	Gergely Tapolczai	Elected, list seat 16, declined seat		
17	Zsuzsanna Jakab	Elected for Budapest 12	Zsolt Németh	Elected, list seat 4		
18	Ervin Nagy	Elected for Fejér 4	Gabriella Selmeczi	Elected, list seat 18, declined seat		
19	Dóra Szűcs	Elected, list seat 4	Péter Szijjártó	Elected, list seat 5		
20	György László Velkey	Elected for Budapest 6	János Lázár	Elected, list seat 6		
21	András Kármán	Elected, list seat 5	Balázs Orbán	Elected, list seat 7		
22	Krisztián Kulcsár	Elected for Budapest 10	István Simicskó	Elected, list seat 8		
23	Márton Melléthei-Barna	Elected, list seat 6	Antal Rogán	Elected, list seat 23, declined seat		
24	Erika Jójárt	Elected, list seat 7	Gergely Gulyás	Elected, list seat 9		
25	Vilmos Kátai-Németh	Elected for Budapest 9	János Bóka	Elected, list seat 10		
26	Zoltán Molnár	Elected, list seat 8	Balázs Hidvéghi	Elected, list seat 11		
27	Csongor Kincse	Elected, list seat 9	Ágnes Molnár	Elected, list seat 27, declined seat		
28	Gabriella Borsós	Elected, list seat 10	Hajnalka Juhász	Elected, list seat 12		
29	Zoltán Péter Szafkó	Elected for Nógrád 1	Bence Rétvári	Elected, list seat 13		
30	Kinga Kalázdi-Kerekes	Elected, list seat 11	Erik Bánki	Elected, list seat 30, declined seat		
31	Zsolt Gyuk	Elected, list seat 12	András Demeter	Elected, list seat 31, declined seat		
32	Orsolya Schummer	Elected, list seat 13	Lőrinc Nacsa	Elected, list seat 14		
33	Lőrinc Varga	Elected, list seat 14	Zsolt Kovács	Elected, list seat 33, declined seat		
34	Anikó Sóti	Elected, list seat 15	Gyula Földesi	Elected, list seat 34, declined seat		
35	Richárd Rák	Elected, list seat 16	György Balla	Elected, list seat 15		
36	Márton Hajdu	Elected, list seat 17	Tamás Menczer	Elected, list seat 36, declined seat		
37	Anett Pásztor	Elected, list seat 18	Dávid Héjj	Elected, list seat 16		
38	István Hantosi	Elected, list seat 19	Csaba Latorcai	Elected, list seat 17		
39	István Gyöngyösi	Elected, list seat 20	Miklós Soltész	Elected, list seat 39, declined seat		
40	Edit Sasi-Nagy	Elected, list seat 21	Gyula Budai	Elected, list seat 18		
41	Mihály Balogh	Elected, list seat 22	Zsolt Nyitrai	Elected, list seat 41, declined seat		
42	Martin Császár	Elected, list seat 23	Barna Pál Zsigmond	Elected, list seat 42, declined seat		
43	Ákos Berki	Elected, list seat 24				
44	Krisztián Márk Simon	Elected, list seat 25				
45	Tamás Tóth	Elected, list seat 26				
46	Krisztián Kőszegi	Elected, list seat 27	Anna Lezsák	Selected as replacement candidate, list seat 19		
47	Máté Kiss	Elected, list seat 28	Balázs Németh	Selected as replacement candidate, list seat 20		
48	Gábor Lukács	Elected, list seat 29	Eszter Vitályos	Selected as replacement candidate, list seat 21		
49	Tibor Kaprinyák	Elected, list seat 30	Bence Tuzson	Selected as replacement candidate, list seat 22		
50	Áron Porcher	Elected for Budapest 15				
51	Nikoletta Boda	Elected for Budapest 11	Balázs Hankó	Selected as replacement candidate, list seat 23		
52	Áron Koncz	Elected for Budapest 4				
53	Endre Márton László	Elected for Pest 6				
54	Andrea Perticsné Kácsor	Elected for Pest 10				
55	Balázs Tóthmajor	Elected for Pest 4				
56	Diána Ruzsa	Elected for Baranya 1				
57	Ildikó Éva Sopov	Elected for Komárom-Esztergom 1				
58	Péter Bódis	Elected for Heves 1				
59	Judit Diószegi	Elected for Győr-Moson-Sopron 1				
60	István Bodóczi	Elected for Békés 1				
61	Anna Müller	Elected for Budapest 13				
62	Ildikó Trompler	Elected for Pest 7				
63	Orsolya Miskolczi	Elected for Pest 5				
64	József Jelencsik	Elected for Pest 1				
65	Alexandra Szabó	Elected for Budapest 14				
66	Ferenc Tibor Halmai	Elected for Jász-Nagykun-Szolnok 2				
67	Viktória Bögi	Elected for Fejér 3				
68	Enikő Tompa	Elected for Hajdú-Bihar 2				
69	Mária Gurzó	Elected for Békés 4				
70	Viktória Lőrincz	Elected for Somogy 1				
71	Tímea Barna-Szabó	Elected for Szabolcs-Szatmár-Bereg 6				
72	József Sárosi	Elected for Tolna 1				
73	Ernő Csatári	Elected for Somogy 4				
74	Csaba Attila Bakos	Elected for Somogy 3				
75	Viktória Strompová	Elected, list seat 31				
76	Mihály Borics	Elected for Fejér 2				
77	Attila Csőszi	Elected for Bács-Kiskun 1				
78	Ádám Veres	Elected, list seat 32	Miklós Seszták	Selected as replacement candidate, list seat 24		
79	Tibor Szabó	Elected, list seat 33				
80	Máté Hende	Elected for Pest 13				
81	István Balajti	Elected for Pest 8				
82	Gergely Muhari	Elected for Pest 14				
83	István Weigand	Elected for Budapest 5	Árpád Takács	Selected as replacement candidate, list seat 25		
84	Gabriella Virágh	Elected for Budapest 8	Zsuzsa Máthé	Selected as replacement candidate, list seat 26		
85	Balázs Trentin	Elected for Budapest 7	Gábor Czirbus	Selected as replacement candidate, list seat 27		
86	Renáta Szimon	Elected for Pest 11				
87	Zita Bilisics	Elected for Pest 9				
88	Krisztina Porpáczy	Elected for Győr-Moson-Sopron 5	Zsófia Koncz	Selected as replacement candidate, list seat 28		
89	László Bicskei	Elected, list seat 34				
90	Nikolett Árvay	Elected for Komárom-Esztergom 3				
91	Balázs Varga	Elected for Zala 2				
92	Bence Csontos	Elected for Bács-Kiskun 6				
93	Zsuzsánna Simon	Elected, list seat 35				
94	Zsolt Ráki	Elected for Békés 3				
95	Zsolt Bóka	Elected, list seat 36				
96	Petra Kovács	Elected, list seat 37	Bálint Nagy	Selected as replacement candidate, list seat 29		
97	László Bugya	Elected, list seat 38				
98	Csaba Lovkó	Elected for Zala 3				
99	Norbert Tóth	Elected, list seat 39				
100	Péter Balatincz	Elected for Veszprém 3	László Horváth	Selected as replacement candidate, list seat 30		
101	Péter Járosi	Elected, list seat 40				
102	Dávid Gombár	Elected for Békés 2				
103	Péter Lajos Szakács	Elected for Szabolcs-Szatmár-Bereg 2	Mihály Witzmann	Selected as replacement candidate, list seat 31		
104	Viktória Dicső	Elected for Szabolcs-Szatmár-Bereg 3				
105	Pál Czakó-Czirbus	Elected, list seat 41				
106	Csilla Németh	Elected, list seat 42				
107	Gyula Kovács	Elected for Bács-Kiskun 4				
108	Nándor Horváth	Elected, list seat 43				
109	Balázs Kapronczai	Elected for Baranya 4				
110	Áron Juhász	Elected for Heves 3				
111	János Kiss	Elected for Heves 2				
112	Dávid Gyömbér	Elected, list seat 44				
113	Balázs Havasi	Elected, list seat 45				
118			János Hargitai	Selected as replacement candidate, list seat 32		
121			Róbert Zsigó	Selected as replacement candidate, list seat 33		
122			János Pócs	Selected as replacement candidate, list seat 34		
123			Péter Takács	Selected as replacement candidate, list seat 35		
130			Krisztina Csibi	Selected as replacement candidate, list seat 36		
131			János Bencsik	Selected as replacement candidate, list seat 37		
152			Barbara Hegedűs	Selected as replacement candidate, list seat 38		
158			Béla Radics	Selected as replacement candidate, list seat 39		
170			Miklós Panyi	Selected as replacement candidate, list seat 40		
218			Gábor Szűcs	Selected as replacement candidate, list seat 41		
237			Piroska Szalai	Selected as replacement candidate, list seat 42		

=== Constituency results ===
Constituency	Previous member		Votes						Vote percentage						Margin (pp)	Turnout (%)	Elected member	
Constituency	Name	Party	TISZA	Fidesz–KDNP	MH	DK	MKKP	Others	TISZA	Fidesz–KDNP	MH	DK	MKKP	Others	Margin (pp)	Turnout (%)	Name	Party
Bács-Kiskun 1	László Salacz	Fidesz	27,753	21,063	3,611	–	525	–	52.41	39.78	6.82	–	0.99	–	12.63	78.47	Attila Csőszi	TISZA
Bács-Kiskun 2	Gyula Tamás Szeberényi	Fidesz	32,688	20,373	3,461	452	555	56	56.76	35.38	6.01	0.78	0.96	0.10	21.38	80.92	János Molnár	TISZA
Bács-Kiskun 3	Sándor Font	Fidesz	24,958	20,257	2,952	754	–	377	50.63	41.09	5.99	1.53	–	0.76	9.54	78.54	Zsolt Judák	TISZA
Bács-Kiskun 4	Sándor Lezsák	Fidesz	27,197	22,100	3,639	340	–	371	50.70	41.20	6.78	0.63	–	0.70	9.5	77.07	Gyula Kovács	TISZA
Bács-Kiskun 5	Gábor Bányai	Fidesz	24,026	19,208	4,058	590	–	196	49.97	39.95	8.44	1.23	–	0.41	10.02	73.91	Katalin Karsai-Juhász	TISZA
Bács-Kiskun 6	Róbert Zsigó	Fidesz	24,905	18,396	3,088	399	–	68	53.15	39.26	6.59	0.85	–	0.15	13.89	76.06	Bence Csontos	TISZA
Baranya 1	Tamás Mellár	Dialogue	35,434	16,883	2,475	794	439	245	62.97	30.00	4.40	1.41	0.78	0.44	32.97	80.12	Diána Ruzsa	TISZA
Baranya 2	Péter Hoppál	Fidesz	35,893	18,121	3,116	900	460	129	61.23	30.91	5.32	1.54	0.78	0.22	30.32	78.64	Áron Kovács	TISZA
Baranya 3	János Hargitai	KDNP	25,405	23,328	3,033	496	–	199	48.43	44.47	5.78	0.95	–	0.38	3.96	77.05	Áron Rózsahegyi	TISZA
Baranya 4	Csaba Nagy	Fidesz	27,914	23,505	2,600	530	306	246	50.66	42.66	4.72	0.96	0.56	0.45	8	75.39	Balázs Kapronczai	TISZA
Békés 1	Tamás Herczeg	Fidesz	30,631	18,322	3,364	635	372	–	57.44	34.36	6.31	1.19	0.70	–	23.08	81.20	István Bodóczi	TISZA
Békés 2	Béla Dankó	Fidesz	25,975	20,183	3,464	459	285	174	51.39	39.93	6.85	0.91	0.56	0.35	11.46	76.69	Dávid Gombár	TISZA
Békés 3	József Kovács	Fidesz	26,014	20,507	2,585	371	307	59	52.19	41.14	5.19	0.74	0.62	0.12	11.05	76.98	Zsolt Ráki	TISZA
Békés 4	Norbert Erdős	Fidesz	27,499	17,677	3,032	464	–	1,518	54.79	35.22	6.04	0.92	–	3.03	19.57	74.34	Mária Gurzó	TISZA
Borsod-Abaúj-Zemplén 1	Katalin Csöbör	Fidesz	32,545	16,921	2,900	1,083	322	406	60.07	31.23	5.35	2.00	0.59	0.75	28.84	78.74	Roland Juhász	TISZA
Borsod-Abaúj-Zemplén 2	János Kiss	Fidesz	31,416	16,260	3,173	498	288	454	60.31	31.22	6.09	0.96	0.55	0.87	29.11	76.71	András Czipa	TISZA
Borsod-Abaúj-Zemplén 3	Gábor Riz	Fidesz	20,399	20,983	2,529	314	185	467	45.46	46.76	5.64	0.70	0.41	1.04	1.3	67.07	Gábor Csuzda	Fidesz
Borsod-Abaúj-Zemplén 4	Zoltán Demeter	Fidesz	27,675	19,506	3,464	522	–	107	53.95	38.06	6.76	1.02	–	0.21	15.89	72.52	Csaba Hatala-Orosz	TISZA
Borsod-Abaúj-Zemplén 5	Richárd Hörcsik	Fidesz	25,284	21,912	2,284	327	198	270	50.29	43.58	4.54	0.65	0.39	0.54	6.71	72.53	László Lontay	TISZA
Borsod-Abaúj-Zemplén 6	Zsófia Koncz	Fidesz	28,528	24,086	2,563	378	–	166	51.20	43.23	4.60	0.68	–	0.31	7.97	76.27	Zoltán Bihari	TISZA
Borsod-Abaúj-Zemplén 7	András Tállai	Fidesz	29,812	22,217	3,302	357	309	211	53.04	39.53	5.87	0.64	0.55	0.38	13.51	76.31	Erzsébet Csézi	TISZA
Budapest 1	Antal Csárdi	Independent (Note: Antal Csárdi was originally elected as a candidate of LMP – Hungary's Green Party (part of United for Hungary) but left its parliamentary group in 2025 and remained independent.)	37,803	18,391	1,948	978	770	66	63.05	30.67	3.25	1.28	1.63	0.11	32.38	81.60	Zoltán Tanács	TISZA
Budapest 2	Vacant		35,772	16,512	1,979	582	717	558	63.80	29.45	3.44	1.04	1.28	0.99	34.35	73.75	Kriszta Bódis	TISZA
Budapest 3	Miklós Hajnal	Momentum	43,112	20,248	2,315	860	1,112	67	63.67	29.90	3.42	1.27	1.64	0.10	33.77	86.76	Péter Magyar	TISZA
Budapest 4	Bence Tordai	Dialogue	45,212	19,994	2,103	990	819	–	65.41	28.93	3.04	1.18	1.43	–	36.49	86.48	Áron Koncz	TISZA
Budapest 5	Lajos Oláh	DK	42,668	14,769	2,344	1,578	875	–	68.59	23.74	3.77	2.54	1.36	–	44.85	81.27	István Weigand	TISZA
Budapest 6	András Jámbor	Dialogue	33,953	15,612	2,825	–	730	10,207	53.62	24.66	4.46	1.15	–	16.12	28.96	81.38	György László Velkey	TISZA
Budapest 7	Dezső Hiszékeny	MSZP	38,809	17,340	2,561	1,287	639	305	63.68	28.45	4.20	2.11	1.05	0.50	35.23	81.28	Balázs Trentin	TISZA
Budapest 8	Ákos Hadházy	Independent (Note: Ákos Hadházy was originally elected as a candidate of Momentum Movement (part of United for Hungary) but did not join to its parliamentary group after the election and remained independent.)	40,918	18,843	3,184	–	1,007	277	63.71	29.34	4.96	–	1.57	0.43	34.37	81.59	Gabriella Virágh	TISZA
Budapest 9	Gergely Arató	DK	36,812	17,538	3,164	1,014	758	134	61.98	29.50	5.32	1.71	1.27	0.23	32.48	79.59	Vilmos Kátai-Németh	TISZA
Budapest 10	Tímea Szabó	Dialogue	41,542	18,829	3,277	1,184	914	–	63.19	28.64	4.98	1.80	1.39	–	34.55	85.72	Krisztián Kulcsár	TISZA
Budapest 11	László Varju	DK	43,122	18,685	3,214	1,228	823	–	64.29	27.86	4.79	1.83	1.23	–	36.43	84.79	Nikoletta Boda	TISZA
Budapest 12	Balázs Barkóczi	DK	41,359	16,505	2,909	2,625	877	–	64.35	25.68	4.53	4.08	1.36	–	38.67	81.98	Zsuzsanna Jakab	TISZA
Budapest 13	Zoltán Vajda	MSZP	38,873	17,638	3,758	2,564	802	81	61.27	27.37	5.92	4.04	1.26	0.13	33.9	83.19	Anna Müller	TISZA
Budapest 14	Mónika Dunai	Fidesz	40,491	20,990	2,580	785	580	423	61.53	31.89	3.93	1.19	0.81	0.64	29.63	85.48	Alexandra Szabó	TISZA
Budapest 15	Ágnes Kunhalmi	MSZP	41,523	20,752	3,386	1,121	666	182	61.40	30.68	5.01	1.66	0.98	0.27	30.71	85.62	Áron Porcher	TISZA
Budapest 16	István Hiller	MSZP	40,693	20,127	3,514	793	674	2,572	59.52	29.44	5.14	1.16	0.99	3.75	30.08	81.86	Zoltán Tarr	TISZA
Budapest 17	Szabolcs Szabó	Momentum	Constituency abolished															
Budapest 18	Endre Tóth	Momentum	Constituency abolished															
Csongrád-Csanád 1	Sándor Szabó	MSZP	44,478	16,030	3,549	758	739	–	67.85	24.45	5.41	1.16	1.13	–	43.4	80.32	Péter Stumpf	TISZA
Csongrád-Csanád 2	Béla Mihálffy	KDNP	36,102	20,169	6,231	549	624	–	56.64	31.72	9.80	0.86	0.98	–	24.92	79.82	Attila Gajda	TISZA
Csongrád-Csanád 3	Sándor Farkas	Fidesz	30,970	20,812	5,492	3,032	454	118	50.87	34.19	9.02	4.98	0.75	0.19	16.68	78.81	Bence Bárkányi	TISZA
Csongrád-Csanád 4	János Lázár	Fidesz	35,419	20,188	3,658	641	425	362	58.36	33.26	6.03	1.06	0.70	0.60	25.1	80.09	Gábor Ferenczi	TISZA
Fejér 1	Tamás Vargha	Fidesz	32,654	21,032	3,157	876	709	139	55.75	35.91	5.39	1.50	1.21	0.24	19.84	84.07	Béla Csiszár	TISZA
Fejér 2	Gábor Törő	Fidesz	29,534	20,033	3,644	533	544	491	53.91	36.57	6.65	0.97	0.99	0.89	17.34	83.19	Mihály Borics	TISZA
Fejér 3	Zoltán Tessely	Fidesz	31,342	22,225	2,995	610	523	58	54.27	38.48	5.19	0.91	1.06	0.10	15.79	83.82	Viktória Bögi	TISZA
Fejér 4	Lajos Mészáros	Fidesz	31,758	17,199	2,927	–	423	189	60.50	32.76	5.58	–	0.81	0.36	27.74	79.15	Ervin Nagy	TISZA
Fejér 5	Gábor Varga	Fidesz	21,981	23,008	3,426	418	340	–	44.70	46.79	6.97	0.85	0.69	–	2.09	75.66	Gábor Varga	Fidesz
Győr-Moson-Sopron 1	Róbert Balázs Simon	Fidesz	32,318	17,568	2,748	546	437	52	60.22	32.73	5.12	1.02	0.81	0.10	27.49	82.09	Judit Diószegi	TISZA
Győr-Moson-Sopron 2	Ákos Kara	Fidesz	33,263	22,419	3,788	586	443	142	54.86	36.96	6.25	0.97	0.73	0.23	17.9	83.23	András Néher	TISZA
Győr-Moson-Sopron 3	Alpár Gyopáros	Fidesz	25,509	26,151	2,934	269	–	283	46.26	47.42	5.32	0.49	–	0.52	1.16	83.25	Alpár Gyopáros	Fidesz
Győr-Moson-Sopron 4	Attila Barcza	Fidesz	33,152	25,467	3,660	707	–	681	52.07	40.00	5.75	1.11	–	1.07	12.07	85.15	Anikó Hallerné Nagy	TISZA
Győr-Moson-Sopron 5	István Nagy	Fidesz	34,231	26,435	3,316	433	470	–	52.76	40.74	5.11	0.67	0.72	–	12.02	82.98	Krisztina Porpáczy	TISZA
Hajdú-Bihar 1	Lajos Kósa	Fidesz	31,991	17,839	2,825	533	450	122	59.50	33.18	5.25	0.99	0.84	0.24	26.32	82.93	Zsolt Tárkányi	TISZA
Hajdú-Bihar 2	László Pósán	Fidesz	32,046	19,276	2,672	472	427	189	58.18	35.00	4.85	0.86	0.78	0.34	23.18	79.68	Enikő Tompa	TISZA
Hajdú-Bihar 3	László Tasó	Fidesz	29,552	24,838	2,920	343	293	95	50.92	42.79	5.03	0.59	0.50	0.16	8.13	74.99	László Csák	TISZA
Hajdú-Bihar 4	István Vitányi	Fidesz	21,800	23,029	2,723	305	242	60	45.27	47.82	5.65	0.63	0.50	0.12	2.55	72.60	István Vitányi	Fidesz
Hajdú-Bihar 5	Sándor Bodó	Fidesz	25,752	22,281	3,034	335	–	103	49.99	43.26	5.89	0.65	–	0.20	6.73	75.91	Romulusz Ruszin-Szendi	TISZA
Hajdú-Bihar 6	István Tiba	Fidesz	26,938	19,891	3,984	756	–	–	52.24	38.57	7.73	1.47	–	–	13.67	76.25	Éva Göröghné Bocskai	TISZA
Heves 1	Gábor Pajtók	Fidesz	35,073	23,111	3,428	435	390	712	54.33	37.70	5.53	0.72	0.61	1.13	16.63	79.65	Péter Bódis	TISZA
Heves 2	László Horváth	Fidesz	29,694	22,789	3,480	587	333	604	51.65	39.64	6.05	1.02	0.58	1.05	12.01	78.26	János Kiss	TISZA
Heves 3	Zsolt Szabó	Fidesz	30,687	24,105	4,861	431	–	104	50.99	40.05	8.08	0.72	–	0.17	10.94	77.34	Áron Juhász	TISZA
Jász-Nagykun-Szolnok 1	Mária Kállai	Fidesz	35,110	19,362	3,979	699	437	84	58.84	32.45	6.67	1.17	0.73	0.14	26.39	80.33	Andrea Rost	TISZA
Jász-Nagykun-Szolnok 2	János Pócs	Fidesz	27,076	21,754	3,144	320	–	514	51.27	41.19	5.95	0.61	–	0.97	10.08	76.43	Ferenc Tibor Halmai	TISZA
Jász-Nagykun-Szolnok 3	Sándor F. Kovács	Fidesz	24,362	24,638	2,828	373	–	167	46.52	47.05	5.40	0.71	–	0.32	0.53	73.06	Sándor F. Kovács	Fidesz
Jász-Nagykun-Szolnok 4	Zsolt Herczeg	Fidesz	28,857	19,879	3,764	392	–	371	54.18	37.32	7.07	0.74	–	0.70	16.86	75.11	Csongor Farkas	TISZA
Komárom-Esztergom 1	János Bencsik	Fidesz	36,785	20,778	2,581	857	510	–	59.80	33.78	4.20	1.39	0.83	–	26.02	79.86	Ildikó Éva Sopov	TISZA
Komárom-Esztergom 2	Gábor Erős	Fidesz	36,344	23,133	3,475	559	414	–	56.85	36.19	5.44	0.87	0.65	–	20.66	79.56	Márk Radnai	TISZA
Komárom-Esztergom 3	Judit Czunyi-Bertalan	Fidesz	34,000	25,061	4,050	539	467	–	53.03	39.09	6.32	0.84	0.73	–	13.94	79.58	Nikolett Árvay	TISZA
Nógrád 1	Zsolt Becsó	Fidesz	28,081	21,219	4,176	–	–	346	52.17	39.42	7.76	–	–	0.64	12.75	75.65	Zoltán Péter Szafkó	TISZA
Nógrád 2	Mihály Balla	Fidesz	26,207	26,418	5,852	451	–	334	44.22	44.58	9.87	0.76	–	0.56	0.36	77.49	Mihály Balla	Fidesz
Pest 1	András Aradszki	KDNP	40,100	21,518	3,606	815	672	–	60.11	32.26	5.41	1.22	1.01	–	27.85	84.14	József Jelencsik	TISZA
Pest 2	Tamás Menczer	Fidesz	42,204	20,206	3,350	738	683	–	62.82	30.08	4.99	1.10	1.02	–	32.74	86.64	Gábor Pósfai	TISZA
Pest 3	Eszter Vitályos	Fidesz	40,789	23,798	4,110	483	715	143	58.24	33.98	5.87	0.69	1.02	0.20	24.26	85.97	Andrea Bujdosó	TISZA
Pest 4	Bence Rétvári	KDNP	35,920	23,234	3,930	801	625	72	55.62	35.98	6.09	1.24	0.97	0.11	19.64	85.10	Balázs Tóthmajor	TISZA
Pest 5	Bence Tuzson	Fidesz	40,500	19,988	3,192	768	664	114	62.09	30.64	4.89	1.18	1.18	0.18	31.45	86.20	Orsolya Miskolczi	TISZA
Pest 6	László Vécsey	Fidesz	39,981	21,632	3,369	542	504	–	60.55	32.76	5.10	0.82	0.76	–	27.79	86.29	Endre Márton László	TISZA
Pest 7	Lajos Szűcs	Fidesz	32,478	23,779	3,914	715	562	–	52.85	38.70	6.37	1.16	0.91	–	14.15	80.89	Ildikó Trompler	TISZA
Pest 8	Zoltán Bóna	Fidesz	33,852	18,897	3,545	518	506	182	58.87	32.86	6.17	0.90	0.88	0.31	26.01	82.04	István Balajti	TISZA
Pest 9	György Czerván	Fidesz	32,930	22,330	4,395	592	444	126	54.15	36.72	7.23	0.97	0.73	0.21	17.43	80.43	Zita Bilisics	TISZA
Pest 10	Tibor Pogácsás	Fidesz	37,930	18,215	3,353	775	583	216	62.11	29.83	5.49	1.27	0.95	0.35	32.28	82.39	Andrea Perticsné Kácsor	TISZA
Pest 11	Károly Pánczél	Fidesz	33,592	23,314	3,896	741	540	–	54.13	37.57	6.28	1.19	0.84	–	16.56	83.36	Renáta Szimon	TISZA
Pest 12	László Földi	KDNP	28,018	22,878	4,066	460	387	–	50.20	40.99	7.29	0.82	0.69	–	9.21	76.09	György Polgár	TISZA
Pest 13	New constituency		26,676	20,912	6,097	348	323	161	48.93	38.36	11.18	0.64	0.59	0.30	10.57	78.40	Máté Hende	TISZA
Pest 14	New constituency		28,878	22,157	4,256	558	–	–	51.71	39.67	7.62	1.00	–	–	12.04	76.66	Gergely Muhari	TISZA
Somogy 1	Attila Gelencsér	Fidesz	27,023	15,832	3,242	545	270	128	57.45	33.66	6.89	1.16	0.57	0.27	23.79	80.07	Viktória Lőrincz	TISZA
Somogy 2	László Szászfalvi	KDNP	19,785	17,581	1,864	511	–	1,872	47.55	42.25	4.48	1.23	–	4.50	5.3	73.67	József Benke	TISZA
Somogy 3	József Attila Móring	KDNP	22,647	20,625	2,811	521	–	305	48.28	43.97	5.99	1.11	–	0.65	4.31	77.53	Csaba Attila Bakos	TISZA
Somogy 4	Mihály Witzmann	Fidesz	25,083	21,747	2,300	598	375	197	49.87	43.23	4.57	1.19	0.75	0.40	6.64	79.65	Ernő Csatári	TISZA
Szabolcs-Szatmár-Bereg 1	Tünde Szabó	Fidesz	37,691	17,264	2,508	468	259	–	64.77	29.67	4.31	0.80	0.45	–	35.1	81.45	László Gajdos	TISZA
Szabolcs-Szatmár-Bereg 2	Győző Vinnai	Fidesz	27,888	21,224	2,957	384	–	–	53.17	40.46	5.64	0.73	–	–	12.71	74.69	Péter Lajos Szakács	TISZA
Szabolcs-Szatmár-Bereg 3	Miklós Seszták	KDNP	28,053	24,485	2,506	446	–	275	50.31	43.91	4.49	0.80	–	0.49	6.4	74.39	Viktória Dicső	TISZA
Szabolcs-Szatmár-Bereg 4	Attila Tilki	Fidesz	21,670	25,166	2,059	262	–	613	43.54	50.56	4.14	0.53	–	1.23	7.02	71.96	Attila Tilki	Fidesz
Szabolcs-Szatmár-Bereg 5	Sándor Kovács	Fidesz	22,074	25,410	3,262	317	–	100	43.14	49.66	6.38	0.62	–	0.20	6.52	72.94	Sándor Kovács	Fidesz
Szabolcs-Szatmár-Bereg 6	Miklós Simon	Fidesz	24,831	23,713	2,552	196	225	314	47.91	45.75	4.92	0.38	0.43	0.60	2.16	74.44	Tímea Barna-Szabó	TISZA
Tolna 1	István Horváth	Fidesz	23,026	17,654	3,224	431	280	36	51.57	39.54	7.22	0.97	0.63	0.08	12.03	78.76	József Sárosi	TISZA
Tolna 2	Krisztina Csibi	Fidesz	20,087	19,433	3,113	359	–	131	46.58	45.07	7.22	0.83	–	0.30	1.51	77.15	Gábor Szijjártó	TISZA
Tolna 3	János Süli	KDNP	20,880	19,987	2,662	416	–	87	47.42	45.39	6.05	0.94	–	0.20	2.03	78.10	Tamás Cseh	TISZA
Vas 1	Vacant		31,847	21,558	2,652	–	491	–	56.32	38.12	4.69	–	0.87	–	18.2	84.73	Róbert Rápli	TISZA
Vas 2	Péter Ágh	Fidesz	25,452	25,700	3,069	440	–	909	45.79	46.26	5.52	0.79	–	1.64	0.47	83.62	Péter Ágh	Fidesz
Vas 3	Zsolt V. Németh	Fidesz	23,226	26,186	3,220	419	–	165	43.64	49.21	6.05	0.79	–	0.31	5.57	82.45	Zsolt V. Németh	Fidesz
Veszprém 1	Péter Ovádi	Fidesz	33,205	20,294	2,871	516	510	64	57.79	35.32	5.00	0.90	0.89	0.11	22.47	83.77	Levente Gáspár	TISZA
Veszprém 2	Károly Kontrát	Fidesz	34,477	21,304	3,336	538	457	72	57.29	35.40	5.54	0.89	0.76	0.12	21.89	82.26	Ágnes Forsthoffer	TISZA
Veszprém 3	Tibor Navracsics	KDNP (Note: Tibor Navracsics was originally elected as a candidate of Fidesz (part of Fidesz–KDNP) but left its parliamentary group in 2022 and joined to the Christian Democratic People's Partys' one.)	28,223	20,749	2,396	535	–	359	54.00	39.70	4.58	1.02	–	0.69	14.3	80.43	Péter Balatincz	TISZA
Veszprém 4	Vacant		25,455	22,881	3,028	674	277	79	48.58	43.67	5.78	1.29	0.53	0.15	4.91	79.34	Szilvia Ujvári	TISZA
Zala 1	László Vigh	Fidesz	30,995	24,981	2,906	465	393	392	51.54	41.54	4.83	0.77	0.65	0.65	10	83.36	Márta Nagy	TISZA
Zala 2	Bálint Nagy	Fidesz	27,981	25,863	3,327	483	400	144	48.08	44.44	5.72	0.83	0.69	0.25	3.64	80.39	Balázs Varga	TISZA
Zala 3	Péter Cseresnyés	Fidesz	30,369	20,282	3,297	793	–	111	55.37	36.98	6.01	1.45	–	0.20	18.39	79.51	Csaba Lovkó	TISZA

=== Party list results by county, postal, foreign and absentee votes ===

Tisza Party swept every county in the list voting, as well as securing Budapest, where it recorded its best result at 63.9% of the vote. Such a performance reflected Budapest's status as the liberal capital, and mirrored the city's vote for the United for Hungary bloc in 2022. The party also performed strongly in the southern Csongrád-Csanád County, where Fidesz lost the most ground compared to 2022, and in the Pest County around the national capital. Conversely, Fidesz recorded its best national result in the eastern Szabolcs–Szatmár–Bereg County, securing 43.7% of the vote; however, they performed significantly better in the postal voting among the Hungarian diaspora, winning 84.2% of the vote. Despite the large margin of victory for Fidesz, the diaspora vote shifted away from the bloc, reportedly by some ten percent of the vote. By contrast, Tisza Party performed strongest among voters casting ballots at Hungarian foreign representations, primarily Hungarian citizens living or working in Western European countries, and among absentee voters voting away from their registered address inside Hungary, taking a combined 72.5% of the vote in this category. Finally, Our Homeland Movement, a far-right party that was seen as a potential kingmaker going into the election, came in third, performing the best in the northern Nógrád County with 7.4% of the vote.

County	TISZA	Fidesz–KDNP	MH	DK	MKKP	Margin
Bács-Kiskun	52.34%	39.07%	6.88%	0.99%	0.72%	13.27%
Baranya	56.94%	35.58%	5.38%	1.36%	0.74%	21.36%
Békés	55.03%	36.88%	6.45%	0.99%	0.64%	18.15%
Borsod–Abaúj–Zemplén	54.79%	37.69%	5.95%	1.01%	0.56%	17.1%
Budapest	63.87%	28.41%	4.60%	1.70%	1.42%	35.46%
Csongrád-Csanád	59.92%	31.29%	6.72%	1.17%	0.90%	28.63%
Fejér	53.99%	37.59%	6.26%	1.20%	0.97%	16.4%
Győr–Moson–Sopron	52.83%	39.37%	6.08%	0.95%	0.76%	13.46%
Hajdú–Bihar	53.42%	39.09%	5.92%	0.90%	0.68%	14.33%
Heves	53.24%	38.29%	6.86%	1.04%	0.57%	14.95%
Jász–Nagykun–Szolnok	52.94%	38.76%	6.68%	0.99%	0.62%	14.18%
Komárom-Esztergom	56.46%	35.55%	5.94%	1.26%	0.79%	20.91%
Nógrád	48.16%	42.90%	7.37%	1.06%	0.51%	5.26%
Pest	57.23%	34.52%	6.31%	1.03%	0.92%	22.71%
Somogy	51.70%	40.76%	5.69%	1.23%	0.62%	10.94%
Szabolcs-Szatmár-Bereg	50.21%	43.72%	4.84%	0.80%	0.43%	6.49%
Tolna	48.91%	43.06%	6.49%	0.98%	0.56%	5.85
Vas	48.96%	43.36%	5.87%	1.09%	0.72%	5.6%
Veszprém	54.52%	37.25%	6.18%	1.22%	0.84%	17.27%
Zala	51.80%	40.23%	6.12%	1.14%	0.70%	11.57%
Total in Hungary	55.76%	36.33%	5.90%	1.16%	0.85%	19.43%
Foreign and absentee voters	72.48%	21.60%	4.24%	0.67%	1.01%	50.88%
Postal votes	13.82%	84.23%	1.45%	0.16%	0.35%	70.41%
Total	53.53%	38.87%	5.67%	1.11%	0.82%	14.66%

=== Party list results by settlement type ===
Settlement type	TISZA	Fidesz–KDNP	MH	DK	MKKP
Village	46.95%	44.89%	6.66%	0.86%	0.63%
Large village	50.05%	41.63%	6.73%	0.89%	0.69%
City	55.52%	36.56%	6.14%	1.07%	0.72%
City with county rights	59.81%	32.48%	5.64%	1.24%	0.83%
County seat, city with county rights	60.87%	31.44%	5.52%	1.30%	0.87%
Capital	63.87%	28.41%	4.60%	1.70%	1.42%

=== Party list results by settlement size ===
Settlement size	TISZA	Fidesz-KDNP	MH	DK	MKKP
Budapest	63.87%	28.41%	4.60%	1.70%	1.42%
100,000–	61.85%	30.65%	5.40%	1.22%	0.89%
50,000–100,000	59.27%	32.78%	5.67%	1.39%	0.89%
20,000–50,000	59.83%	32.31%	5.85%	1.22%	0.80%
5,000–20,000	54.61%	37.37%	6.30%	1.01%	0.71%
1,000–5,000	48.51%	43.32%	6.66%	0.89%	0.63%
500–1,000	44.22%	47.80%	6.55%	0.85%	0.58%
0–500	41.88%	50.27%	6.38%	0.85%	0.62%

=== Turnout ===
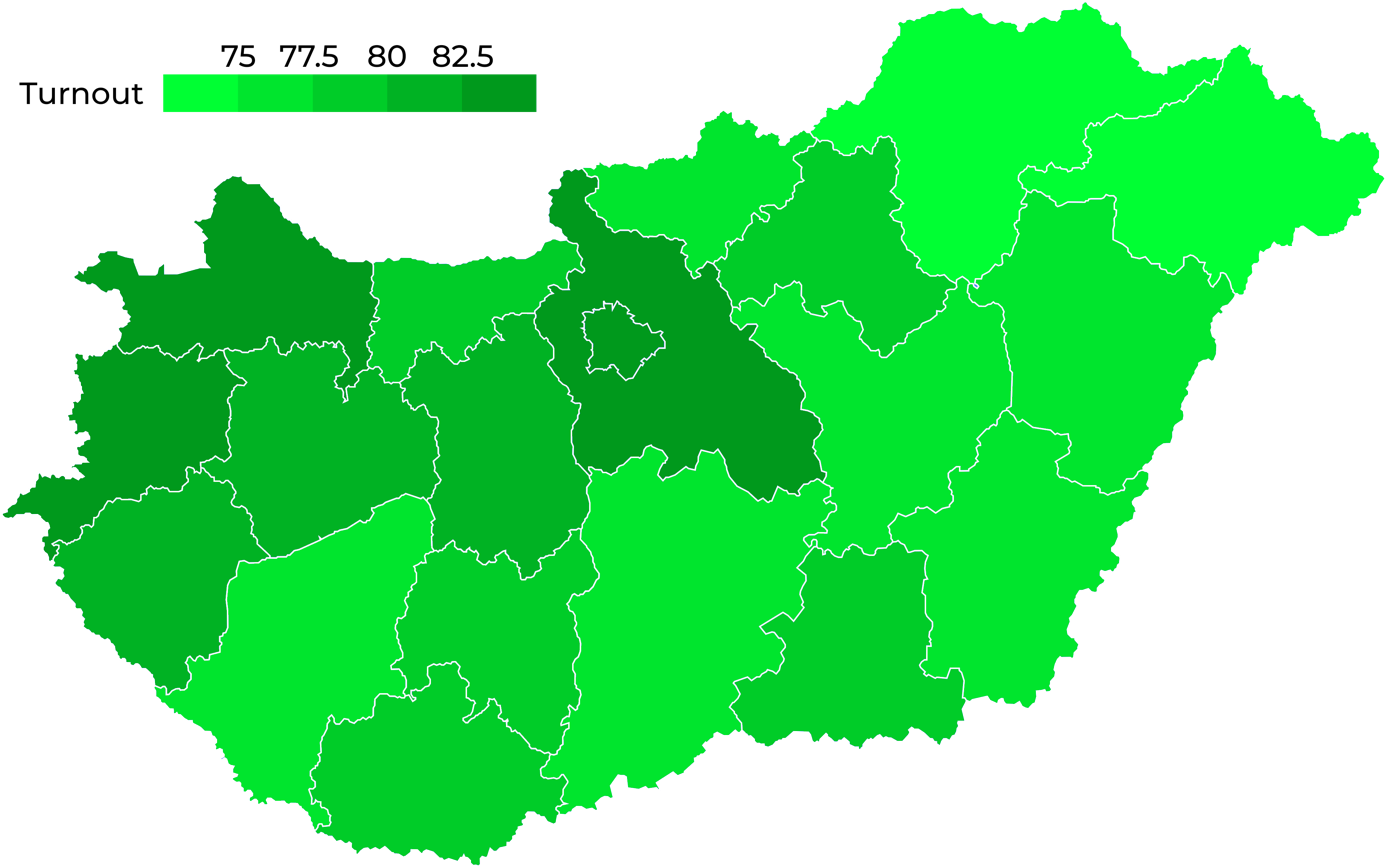
Turnout by county and capital city

Turnout (only within Hungary, excl. voters from abroad)
County	7:00	9:00	11:00	13:00	15:00	17:00	18:30	Overall
Bács-Kiskun	3.66%	18.53%	39.17%	53.09%	64.15%	72.29%	75.71%	77.19%
Baranya	3.43%	16.72%	37.33%	51.93%	63.67%	72.15%	75.67%	77.52%
Békés	3.70%	18.61%	40.69%	54.66%	65.17%	72.07%	75.07%	76.64%
Borsod–Abaúj–Zemplén	2.75%	14.13%	33.69%	44.81%	60.08%	68.13%	71.92%	73.74%
Budapest	3.45%	15.96%	36.98%	56.77%	69.23%	77.18%	80.96%	83.10%
Csongrád-Csanád	3.40%	17.67%	39.50%	55.23%	66.31%	74.19%	77.73%	79.55%
Fejér	3.45%	17.97%	39.95%	55.98%	67.59%	75.82%	79.32%	81.11%
Győr–Moson–Sopron	3.50%	17.29%	39.48%	55.21%	68.38%	78.19%	81.95%	83.45%
Hajdú–Bihar	3.87%	17.73%	37.49%	52.26%	63.33%	71.22%	74.81%	76.61%
Heves	3.39%	17.11%	38.10%	54.02%	65.15%	73.08%	76.66%	78.37%
Jász–Nagykun–Szolnok	3.66%	18.35%	39.22%	53.09%	63.30%	70.77%	73.99%	75.76%
Komárom-Esztergom	3.44%	17.14%	38.81%	54.48%	66.09%	74.36%	77.91%	79.54%
Nógrád	2.97%	15.09%	35.54%	50.49%	62.21%	70.34%	74.16%	76.10%
Pest	3.97%	18.01%	40.10%	58.01%	69.67%	77.58%	80.96%	82.55%
Somogy	3.36%	16.86%	37.73%	52.00%	64.17%	72.48%	75.87%	77.37%
Szabolcs-Szatmár-Bereg	2.84%	14.52%	33.10%	47.62%	60.33%	68.91%	72.62%	74.36%
Tolna	3.64%	18.61%	39.50%	52.54%	63.80%	72.28%	75.86%	77.61%
Vas	3.10%	15.92%	36.97%	52.83%	67.17%	77.66%	81.56%	83.49%
Veszprém	3.42%	17.34%	39.45%	54.96%	67.63%	76.43%	79.86%	81.32%
Zala	2.98%	15.77%	37.41%	52.84%	66.43%	75.59%	79.22%	80.77%
Hungary	3.46%	16.89%	37.98%	54.14%	66.01%	74.23%	77.80%	79.56%

== Aftermath and reactions ==
=== Analysis ===
Domestically, Politico attributed Magyar's victory to six factors: fallout from former President Novák's pardon scandal (Hungarian: kegyelmi ügy), which occurred in February 2024 and had severely eroded Fidesz's image as a protector of traditional family values; Orbán's inability to keep pace with Magyar's more energetic campaign strategy; voters' displeasure with the Orbán government's closeness to Russia and Vladimir Putin in the context of the 2022 Russian invasion of Ukraine and the lingering collective memory of the Soviet occupation of Hungary; inflation and a stagnant economy; Magyar's successful use of social media; and the large youth turnout for Tisza. Other outlets, including The New York Times, reported widespread popular dissatisfaction with Fidesz's governance strategies of clientelism and state capture, which had caused endemic corruption and democratic backsliding in Hungary for more than a decade.

In contrast to the 2022 general election, which saw significant urban–rural political polarization, Tisza was able to win Budapest, smaller cities, and the countryside alike. In fact, rural villages—previously Fidesz's bastions of support—swung toward Tisza by the largest margins. Analysts viewed this as indicating that Tisza had achieved widespread societal buy-in in a way that previous challengers to Fidesz had not, leading some to characterize the election as an "electoral" or even "color revolution." The election marked the first time since 2002 that only three parties or alliances received mandates in the National Assembly and the first time in 106 years that no left-wing parties secured any parliamentary mandates.

Internationally, Magyar's win was generally seen as indicating a desire on the part of the Hungarian electorate to move the country closer to the EU and away from both Russia under Putin and the United States under the second Trump administration; Orbán had closely associated himself with Putin, US President Donald Trump, and US Vice President Vance. Some observers saw Magyar's victory as loss for the global far-right more broadly and predicted that other European right-wing populist or sovereigntist governments, like the Meloni government in Italy, would adjust course in response. The results were described as potentially positive for the functioning of EU institutions in particular, as Orbán had long been a Eurosceptic and used Hungary's veto power to stymie the EU's collective decision-making abilities. Finally, observers predicted that Hungary–Poland relations would improve after the election due to Magyar's less aggressively anti-Ukrainian foreign policy stance.

=== Domestic ===
After many media outlets began to project Magyar as the winner, Orbán congratulated Magyar via a phone call. The announced results were described as free and fair. Magyar said that "today was a celebration of democracy" and interpreted his landslide victory as indicating that the Hungarian people wanted not just a "change of government" (Hungarian: kormányváltás) but a "regime" or "system change" (Hungarian: rendszerváltás)—the term usually used in Hungarian political discourse to describe the country's transition to democracy. Accordingly, he called on "all the puppets" of the Orbán "regime" to resign, including the Prosecutor General, the presidents of the Supreme Court and the Constitutional Court, the director of the Hungarian Media Authority, and other key government officials whom Orbán had appointed. Magyar also called on President Sulyok to resign after appointing him Prime Minister and warned that those who had "plundered the state and sowed hatred among Hungarians" would be held accountable. Pro-European celebrations broke out in Budapest, with Tisza supporters hoping for reintegration into the European political mainstream.

Orbán conceded the election and admitted that "the responsibility and opportunity to govern were not given to us." He added, however, that "We are not giving up. Never, never never," which initially suggested to observers that he intended to remain leader of Fidesz and serve as leader of the opposition in the National Assembly. Two weeks after the election, however, Orbán and Deputy Prime Minister Zsolt Semjén revealed they would not take up their parliamentary mandates. Fidesz nominated Gergely Gulyás to serve as leader of the opposition in Orbán's stead, while the Christian Democratic People's Party nominated Bence Rétvári as its parliamentary group leader. Both Orbán and Semjén offered to resign as presidents of their respective parties. The Christian Democrats' presidium outright rejected Semjén's resignation, while Fidesz scheduled a vote of confidence on Orbán's leadership. Ultimately, when it convened in June 2026 three months after the election, the Fidesz presidium retained its confidence in Orbán and reelected him party president by a margin of 729-8.

László Toroczkai, whose far-right Our Homeland Movement managed to cross the 5% election threshold, reacted negatively to the election results, promising to appeal the vote count to the European Court of Human Rights. He further blamed Magyar's election on "multinational corporations", singling out Facebook, while noting that Our Homeland Movement's level of support had remained unchanged from the previous election. Meanwhile, following her party's failure to clear the threshold to enter the parliament, Dobrev resigned as leader of the Democratic Coalition and congratulated Magyar. The Hungarian Two-Tailed Dog Party, having received less than 1% of votes, found itself needing to repay the state the approximately 686 million Hungarian forints it had received in campaign support.

=== International ===
Many world leaders congratulated Magyar on, or reacted to, his electoral victory. European Commission President Ursula von der Leyen, who had long clashed with Orbán, reacted positively to the election results, saying that "Europe's heart is beating stronger in Hungary tonight". Chinese Foreign Ministry spokesman Guo Jiakun said China congratulated Magyar on his victory.

Slovak Prime Minister Robert Fico, a key ally of Orbán, acknowledged "the choice of the Hungarian people" while calling for a revival of the Visegrád Group. Czech Prime Minister Andrej Babiš, while also congratulating Magyar, praised Orbán as having been "a strong opponent" and called the relationship between Hungary and the Czech Republic "close". Immediately following the election, Serbian President Aleksandar Vučić congratulated Magyar; the next day, he expressed disagreement with Magyar's suggestion that Serbia and Hungary were in Russia's sphere of influence and credited Orbán for having eased Hungarian–Serbian tensions during his premiership. Marine Le Pen, the former leader of France's National Rally, expressed disappointment in the election results, arguing that Orbán had "courageously and resolutely defended Hungary's freedom and sovereignty" for 16 years.

==== United States ====
===== Democrats =====
In the US, prominent Democratic Party politicians, such as Chuck Schumer and Hakeem Jeffries, saw the election as a warning sign for Trump. Former US President Barack Obama reacted positively to the news, describing Magyar's win as a "victory for democracy, not just in Europe but around the world", and compared it to the 2023 Polish parliamentary election that ended the eight-year rule of Law and Justice. Similarly, former Secretary of State and 2016 presidential nominee Hillary Clinton called the result "a win for democracy" and "a significant defeat for Putin, for Trump and for the forces of authoritarianism around the world".

===== Republicans =====
Within the Republican Party, reaction was mixed. Trump, a close ally of Orbán, did not comment on the election on 13 April (one day after the election) even when directly asked to. One day later, he said in an interview with Corriere della Sera that "it wasn't my election" but that Orbán was a "friend of mine ... a good man", and that he did "a good job on immigration". In a separate interview with ABC News that same day, Trump offered a positive assessment of Magyar, calling him a "good man" who would "do good work". Trump then claimed that he had not been "very involved" in the Hungarian election despite having repeatedly endorsed Orbán, which commentators interpreted as Trump's attempting to distance himself from an unsuccessful candidate.

Vance said that he was "sad" but "not surprised" by the election result, although he had campaigned beside Orbán in Budapest and expressed confidence in a Fidesz victory a week prior to the election. Senator from Kentucky and former Senate majority leader Mitch McConnell, writing in an opinion piece for Fox News, criticised American conservatives' fascination with Orbán's social and cultural policies and opined that these were irrelevant to US foreign policy interests. Senator from Mississippi Roger Wicker similarly interpreted the result through a geopolitical lens, viewing it as Hungarian voters' rejection of Orbán's closeness to Putin. In response to Alex Soros celebrating the results, Elon Musk posted on his social media website X claiming that Alex's father, George Soros, had orchestrated Orbán's defeat and that the Soros Fund Management had "taken over Hungary".

==== Russia ====
The Russian government said it was "unfazed" by Orbán's defeat and that it respected the election result. Specifically, Kremlin spokesman Dmitry Peskov commented that "Hungary has made a decision. We respect it. We expect to continue very pragmatic relations with the new Hungarian leadership." Peskov later told Life.ru and Interfax that Russia would not explicitly congratulate Magyar due to Russia's designation of Hungary as an "unfriendly country" but reiterated that the Kremlin was open to "pragmatic" discussions. Prominent Russian businessman and Putin ally Kirill Dmitriev opined that the results would "accelerate the collapse of the EU". Magyar, who had spoken to around ten European leaders by the day after his victory, said that he would not initiate a call with Putin but would speak with him if the Russian side requested this. Magyar added he would encourage Putin to "put an end to the killing and end this war".

== Government formation ==
=== Magyar government's programme ===
Securing a parliamentary supermajority, Magyar declared the end of Orbán's political system as he gained the ability to amend the constitution and dismantle Fidesz control over the judiciary, state-owned enterprises, and the media. Magyar announced plans for sweeping political reforms and called for the resignation of several senior officials, including President Sulyok. Positioning Hungary toward closer alignment with Western institutions, Magyar pledged to restore the country as a strong ally within the EU and NATO. Moreover, the Hungarian forint (Hungary's currency) surged to a 4-year high after Magyar's win.

In his first press conference as presumptive prime minister, Magyar laid out an ambitious reform programme, saying that "our two-thirds mandate allows us to do a lot". He planned to undo Orbán's measures that eroded "the rule of law" and "the system of checks and balances". He also planned significant amendments to the constitution, proposing a limit of two terms (eight years) for the prime minister office. Commentators noted that Magyar's list of individuals associated with Orbán who should resign did not include prominent Fidesz politician Mihály Varga, the governor of the Hungarian National Bank, suggesting that Magyar would seek to cooperate with Varga.

=== Meetings ===
Magyar requested a meeting with Sulyok on 15 April to discuss the transition towards a new government. Sulyok is constitutionally required to convene the new National Assembly within 30 days of the election. He is also required to nominate the person most likely to command a majority in the National Assembly—in this case, Magyar—as Prime Minister, and that candidate would be formally elected by the legislature. Sulyok agreed to a meeting on 15 April with Magyar, Orbán, and Toroczkai. After his meeting with Sulyok, Magyar said that he had reiterated his call for Sulyok to resign from office; according to Magyar, Sulyok responded that he would "take [Magyar's] arguments into consideration" on this point. Sulyok also committed himself to convening the National Assembly "at the earliest possible date after the final result is announced" and that he would "officially nominate" Magyar for the post of Prime Minister on that date. Magyar expressed a desire for this date to be as early as 4 May but said he believed that 6–7 May was more likely. The National Assembly convened on 9 May, with Magyar inaugurated as Prime Minister.

== See also ==
- 2026 elections in the European Union
- 2026 Hungarian presidential election
