= Mohácsi =

Mohácsi and its variations are Hungarian surnames meaning "from Mohács". Notable people with the surname include:

- Ferenc Mohácsi (1929–2025), Hungarian sprint canoeist
- István Mohácsy (born 1996), Hungarian politician
- Viktória Mohácsi (born 1975), Hungarian Roma politician
