= Tibor Szabó =

Hungarian politician

Member of the National Assembly
- Incumbent
- Assumed office 9 May 2026

Personal details
- Party: TISZA

Tibor Szabó is a Hungarian politician who was elected member of the National Assembly in the 2026 Hungarian parliamentary election.
