= Dávid Héjj =

Hungarian politician

Héjj Dávid Ádám (born in 1983) is a Hungarian sociologist and politician. He is a member of National Assembly of Hungary (Országgyűlés) since May 8, 2018. He was elected through the platform of Fidesz. He has been a member of the Legislative Committee of the National Assembly since 11 May 2018. He became vice-chairman of the aforementioned committee in May 2026.
