= Gábor Zacher =

Hungarian physician (born 1960)

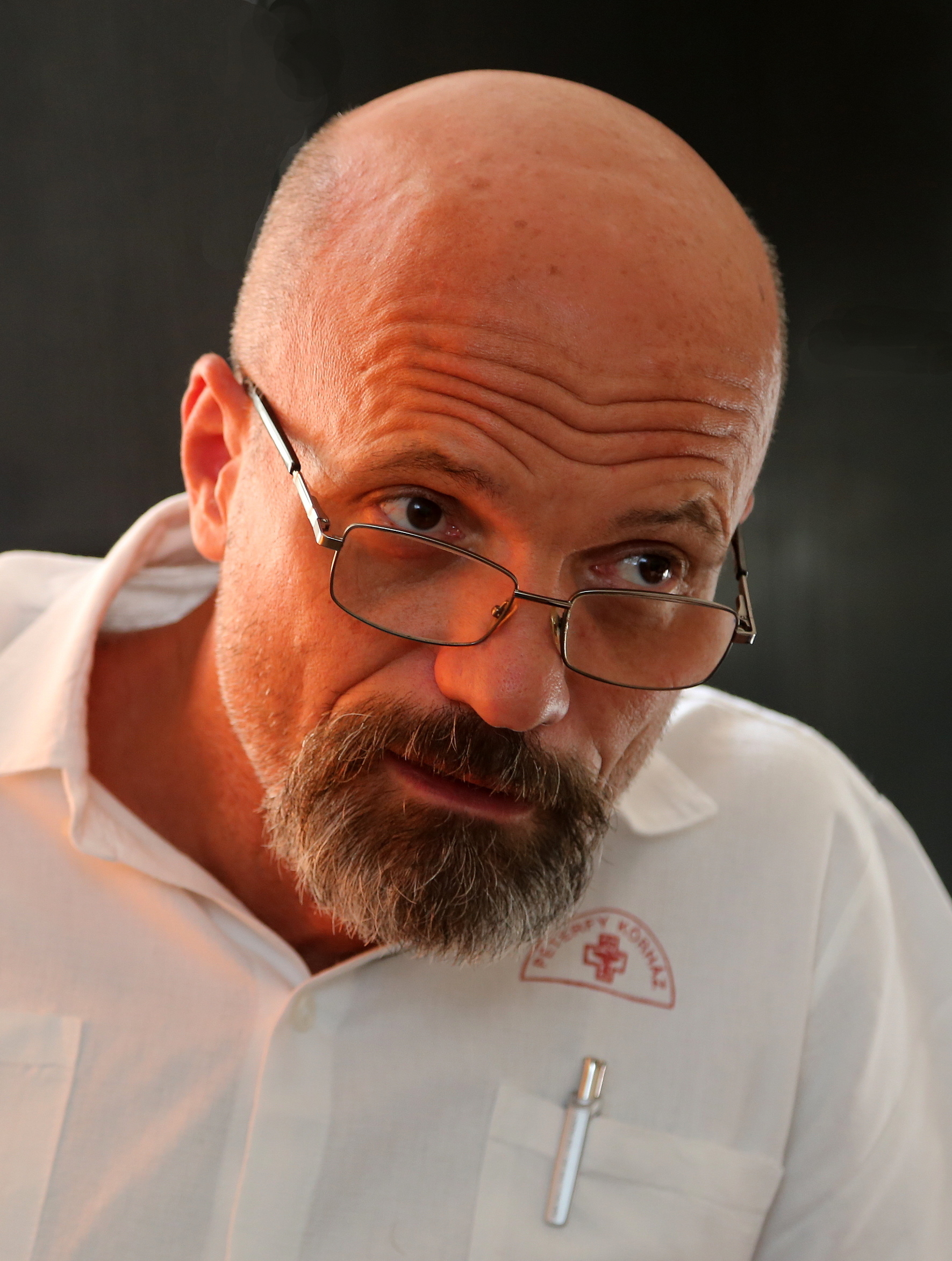
- Born: October 8, 1960 (age 65); Budapest, Hungary
- Known for: toxicologist
- Scientific career
- Fields: Medicine
- Institutions: Péterfy Sándor Hospital

Dr. Gábor Zacher (born Budapest, October 8, 1960) is a Hungarian physician specializing in toxicology, Chief Medical Officer of the Toxicology Department in the Péterfy Sándor Utcai Hospital, Budapest.

His great-grandfather's cousin was Franz Sacher.

== Memberships ==
- Mentésügyi, Sürgősségi, Katasztrófaorvostani Szakmai Kollégium
- Sürgősségi Orvostani Társaság
- Magyar Toxikológus Társaság
- Lege Artis Medicinae
- Studium & Practicum
