= Béla Pál =

Hungarian educator and politician

Member of the National Assembly
- In office 28 June 1994 – 5 May 2014

Personal details
- Born: 5 October 1953 (age 72) Zalaegerszeg, Hungary
- Party: MSZMP (1978–89); MSZP (since 1989)
- Profession: educator, politician

Béla Pál (born 5 October 1953) is a Hungarian educator and politician, member of the Hungarian Socialist Party (MSZP). He served as Secretary of State of the Prime Minister's Office from 2002 to 2003, Secretary of State for Economic Affairs and Transport from 2003 to 2004, and Secretary of State for Regional Development and Cohesion from 2004 to 2006. He was a Member of Parliament (MP) between 1994 and 2014.
