= Gergely Muhari =

Hungarian politician

Member of the National Assembly
- Incumbent
- Assumed office 9 May 2026
- Preceded by: Constituency established
- Constituency: Pest 14th

Personal details
- Born: 1983 Szolnok
- Party: TISZA

Gergely Muhari is a Hungarian politician who was elected member of the National Assembly in 2026. Before his political career, he worked at a multinational company for nine years, and he also worked as a social worker, which he calls his passion.
