= István Mohácsy =

Hungarian politician (born 1996)

President of Fidelitas
- Incumbent
- Assumed office 17 November 2024
- Preceded by: Dániel Farkas

Personal details
- Born: 15 September 1996 (age 29)
- Party: Fidesz

István Mohácsy (born 15 September 1996) is a Hungarian politician serving as president of Fidelitas since 2024. From 2022 to 2024, he served as vice president of Fidelitas. He has been a municipal councillor of Biatorbágy since 2019. He was a candidate for the National Assembly in the 2026 parliamentary election.
