= Zsolt Papp =

Hungarian politician (born 1981)

Member of the National Assembly
- Incumbent
- Assumed office 9 May 2026

Personal details
- Born: 10 May 1981 (age 45)
- Party: Fidesz

Zsolt György Papp (born 10 May 1981) is a Hungarian politician who was elected member of the National Assembly in 2026. He has served as president of the Hungarian Chamber of Agriculture since 2025.
