= István Bodóczi =

Hungarian politician (born 1990)

Member of the National Assembly
- Assuming office 9 May 2026
- Succeeding: Tamás Herczeg
- Constituency: Békés County 1st

Personal details
- Born: 4 March 1990 (age 36)
- Party: Tisza

István Bodóczi (born 4 March 1990) is a Hungarian politician who was elected member of the National Assembly in 2026. He has been a municipal councillor of Békéscsaba since 2024.
