= Zsuzsanna Jakab (politician) =

Hungarian politician

Member of the National Assembly
- Assuming office 9 May 2026
- Succeeding: Balázs Barkóczi
- Constituency: Budapest 12th

Personal details
- Born: 1975 or 1976 (age 49–50)
- Party: Tisza

Zsuzsanna Jakab is a Hungarian politician who was elected member of the National Assembly in 2026. She is an external member of the Human Resources Committee of the General Assembly of Budapest.
