= Partizán =

Hungarian YouTube channel

YouTube information
- Channel: Partizán
- Years active: 2018–present
- Genre: public life
- Subscribers: 710 thousand
- Views: 417 million
- Last updated: October 2026

Partizán is a Hungarian independent media outlet. Created by Márton Gulyás, it is one of the most popular Hungarian political YouTube channels.

== History ==
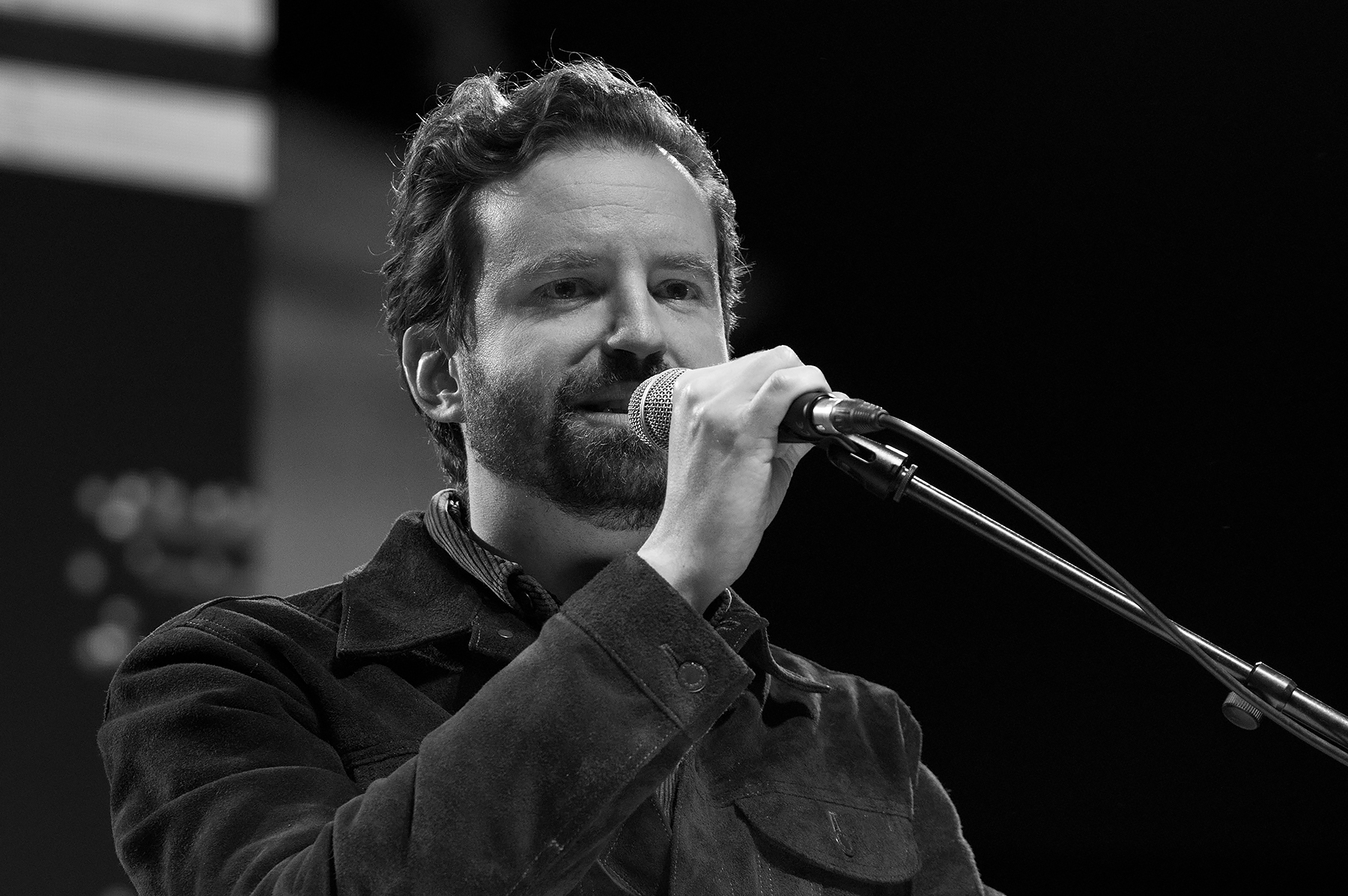
Partizán was created by Márton Gulyás (pictured in 2024), a theater manager turned political activist.

Preceded by the channel Slejm – a torkon ragadt politika, Partizán was started in the autumn of 2018 by Márton Gulyás, a theater manager turned political activist. In early 2020, during the COVID-19 lockdowns, Partizán broadcast live every day. Prior to the 2022 parliamentary elections, the channel deployed a mobile studio on a truck that went to rural Hungarian towns with the goal of informing more people about the upcoming election, since the majority of people living there consume solely pro-government media and vote for the ruling Fidesz party. In November 2025, Partizán was fined 200,000 forints (€525) by the Media Council for the interview of Péter Aranyosi, in which Aranyosi made insulting remarks about Romani people.

Following Fidesz–KDNP's 2026 defeat, many people connected to the outgoing government gave interviews to Partizán and other independent outlets. In August 2026, Gulyás announced his resignation from the editor-in-chief role, being replaced by Vince Földiák. On 5 October 2026, Partizán was not allowed inside the Parliament, which was criticized by Prime Minister Péter Magyar. In November 2026, Földiák announced his resignation effective at the end of the year, with Gulyás taking over. They also announced that 19 staff members (26% of staff) are planned to be laid off, as the channel's new content directions do not require so many employees.

== Programming ==
Partizán mostly posts political interviews, including with opposition politicians who could hardly get airtime on public television under the Orbán regime, such as Péter Márki-Zay and Péter Magyar, and foreign politicians, like Bernie Sanders and Angela Merkel. Under Orbán's premiership, Fidesz politicians have not appeared in interviews despite having been invited numerous times. Partizán also holds political debates, talk shows, podcasts, newsletters, live events, investigative reports, in-depth political analyses, and produces documentaries dealing with topics, including the takeover of the University of Theatre and Film Arts (SZFE), and the enrichment of Prime Minister Viktor Orbán and his family. Its flagship daily show was a roundtable which analyzes the day's news from a leftist perspective. Partizán's videos often receive hundreds of thousands of views. The Reuters Institute for the Study of Journalism has described the channel as providing "in-depth, trustworthy reporting on issues ignored by most other outlets".

As of 2025, 180 volunteers work for the channel. Partizán employed 72 people as of November 2026. As of November 2020, 50% of the viewers are aged 18–35.

== Financing ==
The channel is financed by tenders, advertising revenue, events, product sales, and micro-donors, with some larger sources, including the National Endowment for Democracy, German Marshall Fund, and The Foundation for Democracy and Pluralism. Partizán is also financed through 1% donations of payroll taxes: (Note: Similar to Poland and Romania, taxpayers can allocate 1% of their personal income tax to a non-profit entity of their choice.)

1% donations of payroll taxes
| Year | Forints | Pos | Diff | Donors | Ref |
|---|---|---|---|---|---|
| 2023 | 191,131,793 | 3rd | New entry | 21,122 | |
| 2024 | 416,389,329 | 1st | ▲ +117.85% | 36,978 | |
| 2025 | 471,852,992 | 2nd | ▲ +13.32% | 38,383 | |
| 2026 | 576,936,522 | 1st | ▲ +22.27% | 42,854 | |

== Awards ==
- National Association of Hungarian Journalists (MÚOSZ) Economic Policy and Media Studies Section Economic Journalism Award (2021)
- Hégető Honorka Award (2022)
- MÚOSZ Hungarian Press Award (2023)
