= Péter Magyar =

Prime Minister of Hungary since 2026

Péter Magyar MP
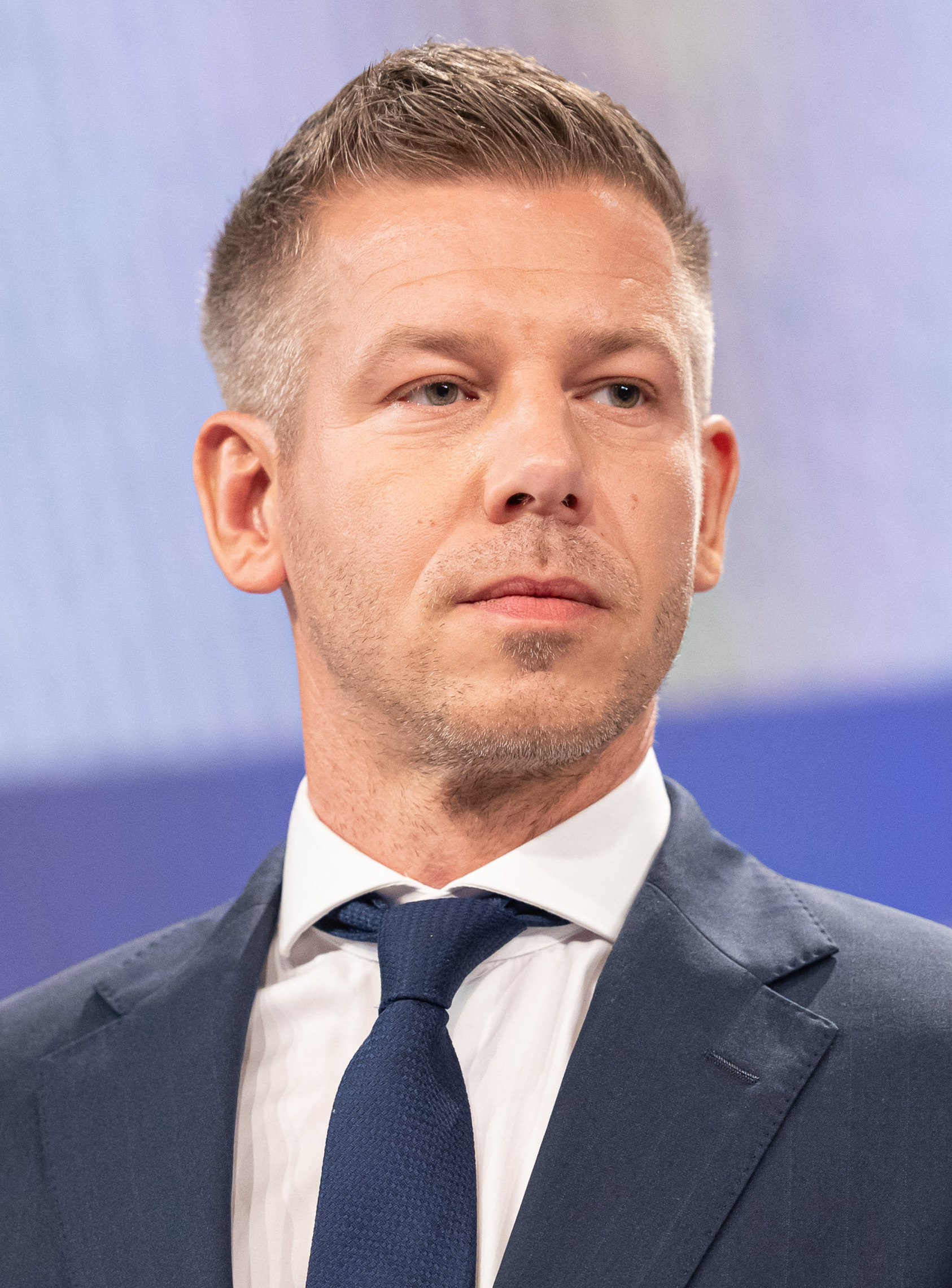
- Magyar in 2026

Prime Minister of Hungary
- Incumbent
- Assumed office 9 May 2026
- President: Tamás Sulyok; Ágnes Forsthoffer (acting); András Baka
- Deputy: Anita Orbán; Bálint Ruff
- Preceded by: Viktor Orbán

President of Tisza
- Incumbent
- Assumed office 22 July 2024
- Vice President: Zoltán Tarr; Márk Radnai; Ágnes Forsthoffer
- Preceded by: Attila Szabó

Member of the National Assembly
- Incumbent
- Assumed office 9 May 2026
- Preceded by: Miklós Hajnal
- Constituency: Budapest 3rd

Member of the European Parliament
- In office 16 July 2024 – 9 May 2026
- Succeeded by: Csaba Bogdán
- Constituency: Hungary

Personal details
- Born: 16 March 1981 (age 45) Budapest, Hungary
- Party: TISZA (since 2024)
- Other political affiliations: Fidesz (2002–2024)
- Spouse: Judit Varga (m. 2006; div. 2023)
- Children: 3
- Relatives: Márton Melléthei-Barna (brother-in-law); Pál Erőss (maternal grandfather); Ferenc Mádl (maternal great-uncle); Dalma Mádl (maternal great-aunt); Tamás Freund (maternal second uncle)
- Education: Pázmány Péter Catholic University (JD)
- Occupation: Politician; diplomat; lawyer
- Magyar's voice Magyar on the release of frozen European Union funds Recorded 29 May 2026

Péter Magyar (Note: Pronounced /ˈmɑːdjɑːr/ MAHD-yar or /ˈmɑːdʒɑːr/ MAH-jar; Hungarian: [ˈpeːtɛr ˈmɒɟɒr]) (born 16 March 1981) is a Hungarian politician who has served as the prime minister of Hungary since May 2026. He has been the president of the Tisza Party since 2024 and was a member of the European Parliament (MEP) from 2024 to 2026.

A former member of Fidesz, which governed Hungary from 2010 to 2026, Magyar rose to political prominence in 2024 in the wake of the Katalin Novák presidential pardon scandal. With the goal of forming a political platform distinct from both Fidesz and older opposition parties, Magyar assumed leadership of the formerly extraparliamentary Tisza and emerged as Hungary's leading opposition leader.

Under Magyar's leadership, Tisza came second in the 2024 European Parliament election and secured a supermajority victory in the 2026 general election, ousting long-serving Prime Minister Viktor Orbán. Magyar's premiership has focused on dismantling the "System of National Cooperation" set up during the Orbán era. To this end, Magyar has initiated amendments to the Fundamental Law removing President Tamás Sulyok and other top Orbán-era officials; imposed term limits on prime ministers and members of the National Assembly; removed Fidesz appointees from the helm of state-funded institutions; established government agencies to reappropriate public assets; and pursued rapprochement with the European Union and Ukraine.

Ideologically, Magyar identifies as a "critical pro-European" and "conservative liberal".

== Early life and education ==
Magyar was born on 16 March 1981 in Budapest to a family with Hungarian and, on his maternal grandmother's side, German origins. Both of his parents were jurists: his father, István Magyar, worked as a lawyer; his mother, Mónika Erőss, worked in the judicial branch. He has two younger siblings: his brother, Márton, is a journalist and founder of the Kontroll.hu media; his sister is a jurist and also works in the judicial branch.

His family from maternal side includes many prominent individuals in Hungarian politics, law and scientific fields. His grandfather Pál Erőss was a judge who hosted a popular television program about legal matters. His great-uncle and aunt, Ferenc Mádl and Dalma Mádl – who were also his godparents and Erőss's siblings-in-law – served as President and First Lady of Hungary from 2000 to 2005. His mother's second cousin Tamás Freund served as President of the Hungarian Academy of Sciences from 2020 to 2026.

Magyar completed his studies at the High School of Piarists and at the Faculty of Law of Pázmány Péter Catholic University in Budapest and at Humboldt University in Berlin as part of the Erasmus Programme, and received his degree in 2004.

== Legal and early political career ==
=== In Fidesz ===
Before entering politics in a local chapter of Fidesz, which was then an opposition party, Magyar participated in the pro bono legal representation and assistance for anti-government activists during the 2006 protests. His earlier role in Fidesz has been variously described as that of a "powerful insider" and "former official". After Fidesz took power in the 2010 parliamentary election, he was appointed to a position in the Ministry of Foreign Affairs. A year later, coinciding with the Hungarian European Union presidency, he joined the Permanent Representation of Hungary to the Union. In 2015, he took a post in the Prime Minister's Office. In September 2018, he took over the management of the EU Legal Directorate of the state-owned MBH Bank. Between 2019 and 2022, he was the CEO of the Student Loan Center.

=== Leaving Fidesz ===
Magyar first came to prominence for his criticism of government politicians after the Katalin Novák presidential pardon scandal in February 2024. Novák, then President of Hungary, had granted a presidential pardon in April 2023 to Endre Kónya, the deputy director of a state-run children's home near Budapest. Kónya had coerced children into covering up sexual abuse by his superior, János Vásárhelyi, the home's director. The revelation resulted in anti-government protests demanding that Novák resign; she did so on 10 February 2024. The same day, Judit Varga, a former justice minister and Magyar's then-wife, who had countersigned the pardon, also announced her resignation from the National Assembly and her role leading the Fidesz party list in the June 2024 European Parliament election. In February 2024, Magyar released a voice recording of his ex-wife Varga regarding the Schadl–Völner corruption case, which he had secretly made without her knowledge. It showed that Cabinet Minister Antal Rogán or his associates had manipulated documents in the case in order to hide evidence that would have incriminated Rogán.

Hours after Varga announced her withdrawal from politics, Magyar published a Facebook post declaring that he was resigning his positions in two state-owned enterprises and relinquishing his seat on the board of a third, MBH Bank. He wrote that the past few years had made him realize that Viktor Orbán's professed ideal of a "national, sovereign, bourgeois Hungary" was in fact a "political product" that obscured massive corruption and transfers of wealth to those with the right connections.

In the following weeks, Magyar conducted a number of interviews with Hungary's most popular news organizations, including Partizán, Telex, and 444, in which he extensively criticized the government, particularly Minister of the Prime Minister's Cabinet Office Antal Rogán. He claimed that during his tenure as the head of the national student loan provider, he had been forced to favor those close to Orbán in public invitations to tender and pressured on aspects of his divorce. His first interview, in which he said that "a few families own half the country", had been viewed more than two million times as of March 2024.

On 20 March 2024, Magyar testified for several hours at the Metropolitan Prosecutor's Office regarding the high-profile corruption case involving President of the Court Bailiffs György Schadl over bribes paid to former Secretary of State for Justice Pál Völner. Shortly after his testimony, he announced to the press that he had proof in the form of audio recordings that Cabinet Minister Antal Rogán or his associates had manipulated documents in the case in order to hide evidence that would have incriminated Rogán. In a Facebook post a few days later, he promised to make the recordings public at 9 am on 26 March 2024, the date of his next appointment to testify and present the evidence to the prosecutors. He wrote that once this happened, Chief Prosecutor Péter Polt as well as the entire Orbán government would have no choice but to resign. On 26 March, Magyar released the recording to the public. It contains a two-minute discussion between himself and his ex-wife Judit Varga about the Schadl-Völner corruption case. Varga's comments implicate Rogán in tampering with evidence by having his and/or his associates' names removed from documents associated with the case. He has turned the recording over to prosecutors.

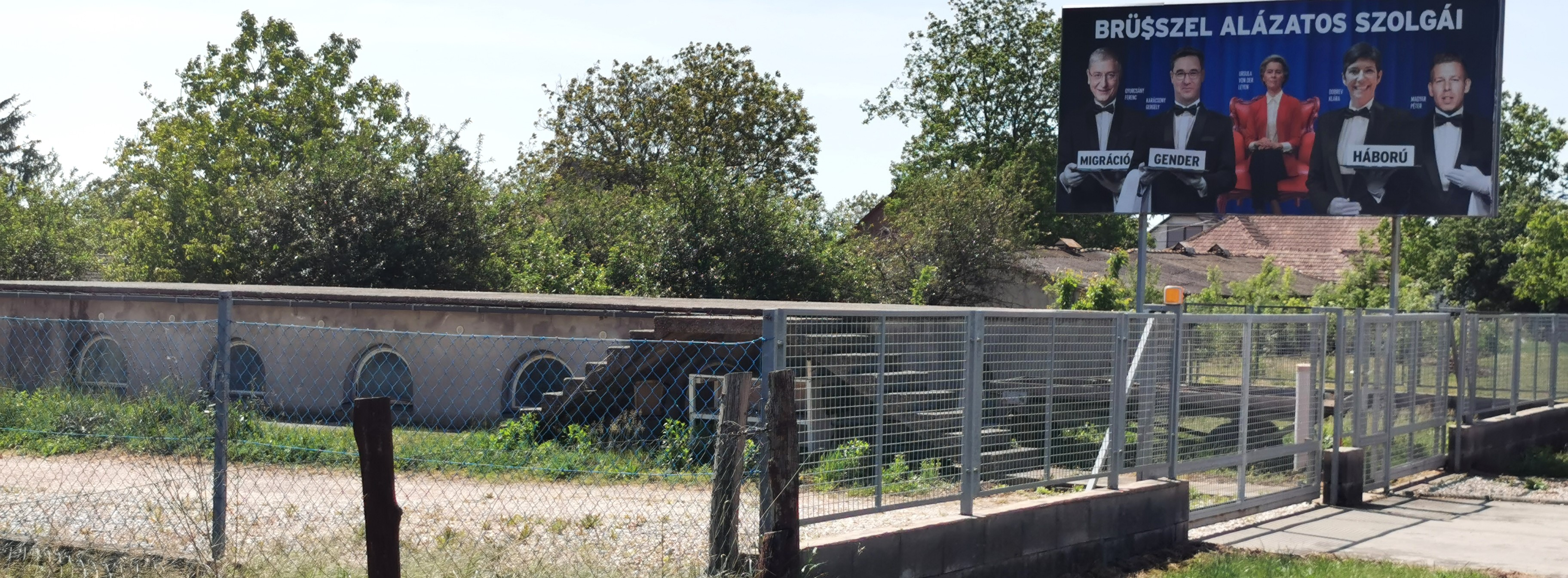
Propaganda poster against Magyar (far right) and other oppositional politicians

Fidesz, concerned about unwanted attention Magyar's appearances were drawing to Fidesz, launched initiatives to discredit him. Allegations started by pro-government newspapers and public figures tried to defame Magyar by accusing him of domestic violence. According to right-wing Journalist Zsolt Bayer, "we here in Fidesz have known for about ten years how he treats his wife". A police report from December 2020 was leaked and widely reported by government-affiliated media. It detailed aggressive behavior by Magyar toward his wife and the police officers who arrived at her request to intervene in a heated argument. Magyar said the report was "90% lies".

Magyar continued publishing posts critical of figures associated with the government in the subsequent days, claiming that people friendly with or related to the prime minister, like his son-in-law István Tiborcz, had amassed enormous wealth hidden behind domestic private equity funds. On 15 March 2024, he held a rally attended by tens of thousands in Budapest at which he announced the formation of a new political party. According to polling conducted that month, around 15 percent of voters claimed they were "certain or highly likely" to vote for Magyar if he ran for office.

On 6 April 2024, Magyar organised a second demonstration against the government, citing what he calls a "feudalistic system" that needs dismantling. Hundreds of thousands of protesters attended. The government-supported Megafon think tank spent 117 million HUF on an ad campaign against Magyar on Facebook in the weeks leading up to the rally.

== Leader of the opposition (2024–2026) ==
=== Tisza Party ===
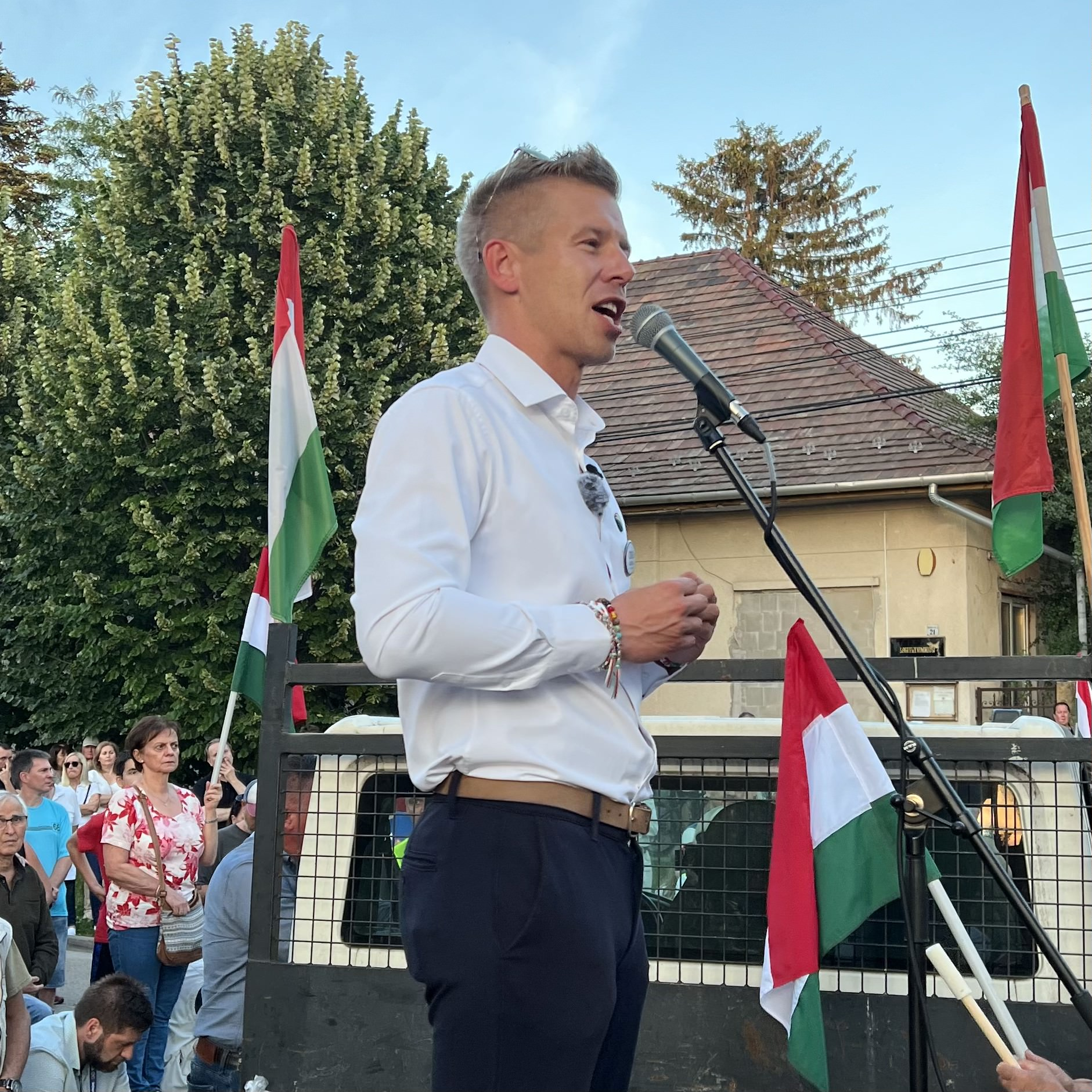
Magyar at Szigetszentmiklós in 2024, during his first political tour

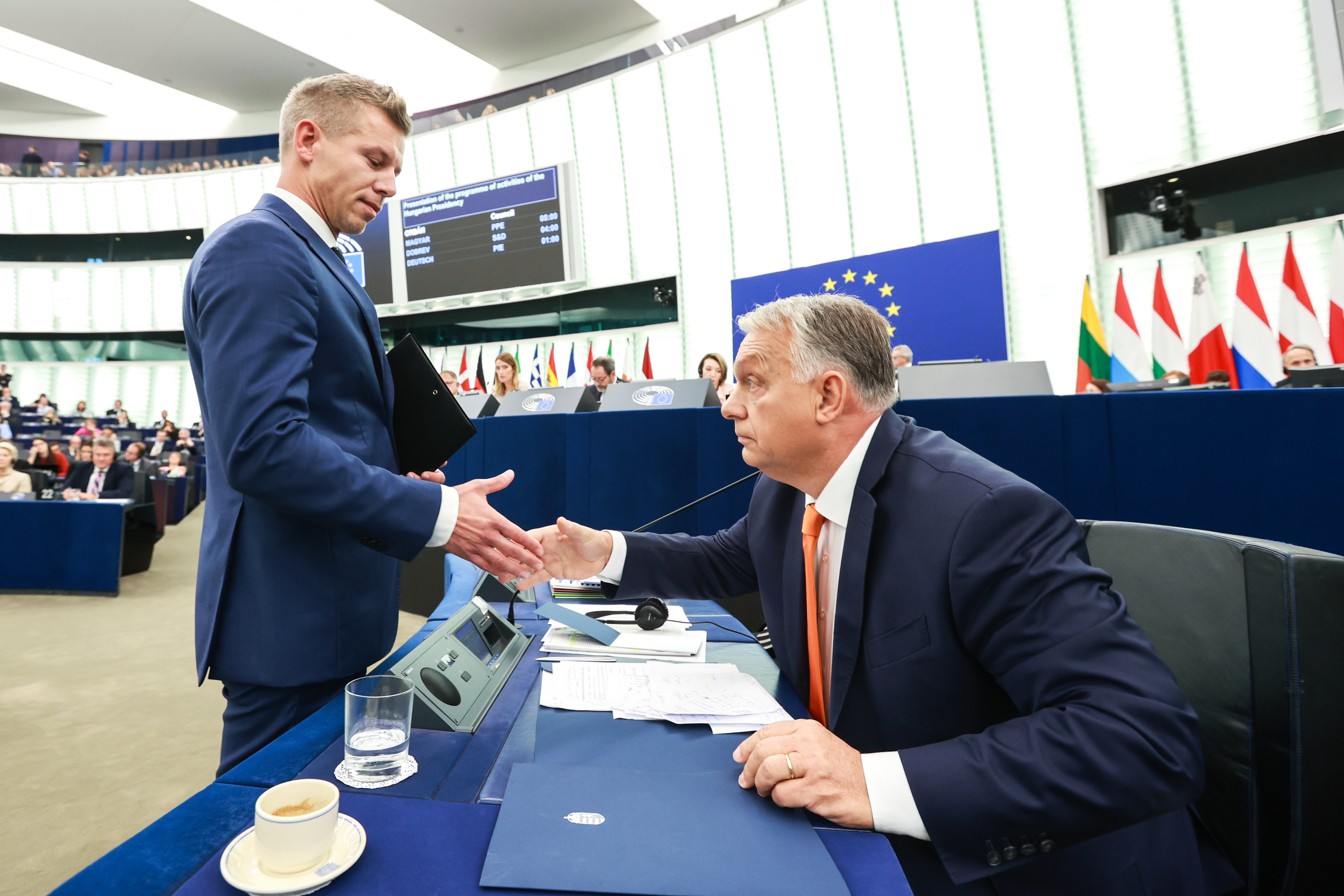
Magyar and Prime Minister Viktor Orbán in 2024 at the European Parliament

Magyar joined the Tisza Party to contest the 2024 European Parliament elections. He decided to take over the minor party (as opposed to founding a new one) to overcome time constraints and potential administrative problems. Following the announcement, Magyar quickly gained national attention and significant public support, challenging both the ruling Fidesz and the traditional opposition. Following the 2024 European Parliament election, the Tisza Party emerged as the strongest opposition party in Hungary, and Magyar was widely regarded as the new leader of the opposition.

While the Tisza Party officially avoids fixed ideological labels, Magyar's rhetoric often reflects centrist and moderate conservative values, emphasising national unity and political accountability over partisanship. Magyar has repeatedly stated that the Tisza Party would not enter into any alliance with the so-called "old opposition" parties, emphasising that Tisza intended to challenge Fidesz on its own in the 2026 parliamentary elections. Magyar was unanimously chosen as the leader of the Tisza Party's national list and prime ministerial candidate. Under his leadership, Tisza adopted the slogan "Now or never!" (Most vagy soha!). In the latter stages of the 2026 campaign, signs appeared with "or never" crossed out to convey urgency.

=== Demonstrations ===
Before the 2024 European Parliament elections, Magyar held four major demonstrations that attracted tens of thousands of participants. The first, on 15 March 2024, took place at the Andrássy Avenue, before he joined the Tisza Party and marked his emergence as a political figure following his public criticism of the government.

He organised a second large rally on 6 April 2024, where sympathizers marched from Deák Square to Kossuth Square in Budapest. During the 6 April rally, Magyar announced that he would begin a nationwide political tour, stating that his next major event would be held in Debrecen, in front of the Reformed Great Church on 5 May 2024, Mother's Day. Magyar held his fourth major rally on 8 June 2024 at the Heroes' Square in Budapest as the closing event of the Tisza Party's campaign for the European Parliament election.

After the election, Magyar held eight more demonstrations. Magyar organised his fifth major rally on 5 October 2024 in front of the headquarters of Hungary's public broadcaster MTVA. During the demonstration, he placed a poster listing sixteen demands on the building's main entrance, calling for media freedom and government accountability.

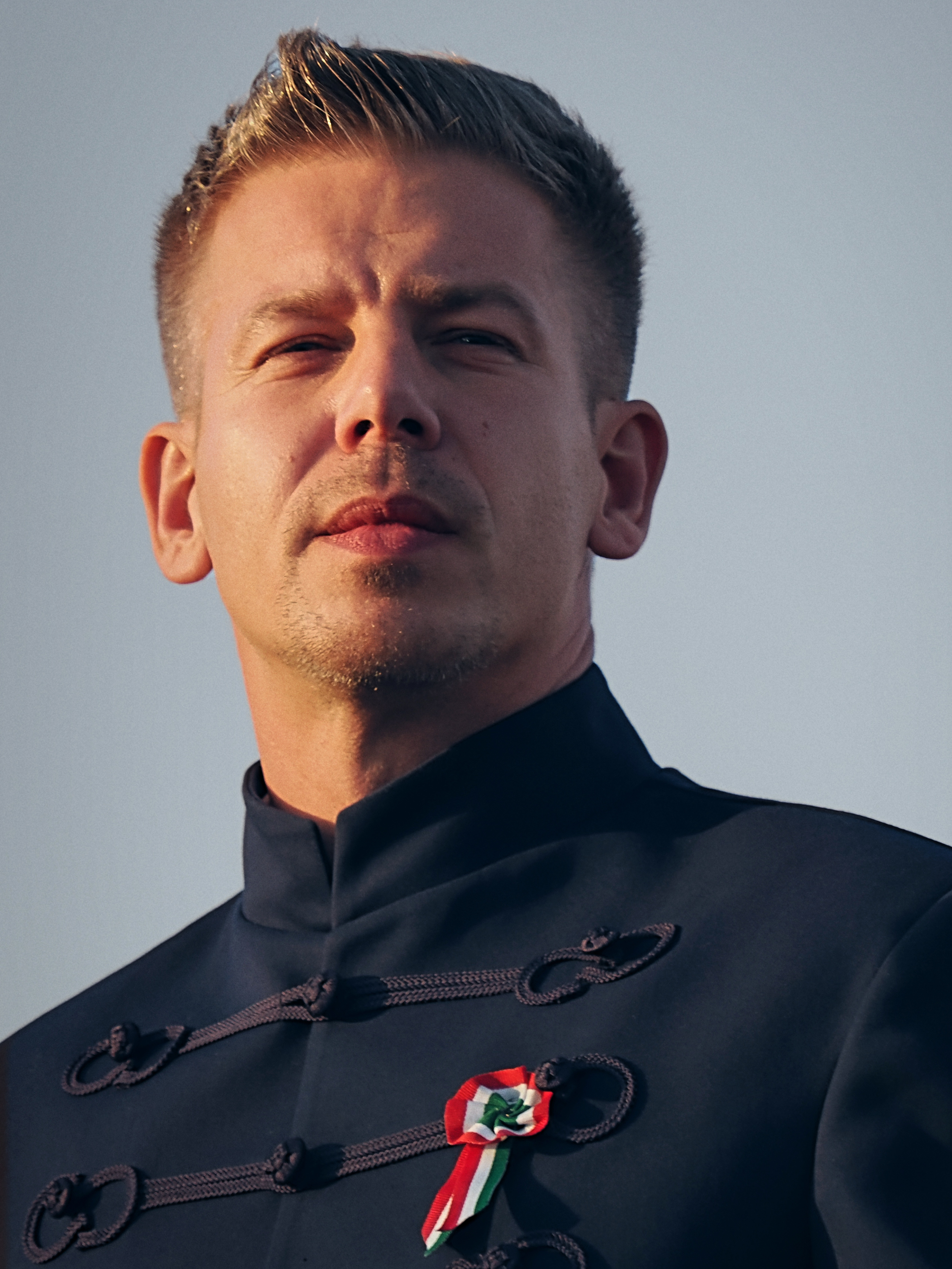
Magyar at the 15 March ceremony in 2026, wearing a traditional outfit and a cockade

Magyar held his sixth major rally on 23 October 2024, commemorating the anniversary of the 1956 Hungarian Revolution. The demonstration began at Bem József Square and continued with a march to Széna Square in Budapest, attracting tens of thousands of participants. Magyar held his seventh major rally on 15 March 2025 in Budapest, at the same location as his first demonstration a year earlier. During the event, he announced the launch of the "Voice of the Nation" public consultation, which he described as a form of grassroots referendum. The results of the initiative were intended to be incorporated into the Tisza Party's future political programme. Former Chief of General Staff, Romulusz Ruszin-Szendi also appeared on stage as the defence policy expert of the Tisza Party.

On 20 August 2025, Magyar held the eighth major demonstration in Pannonhalma, titled "In the Footsteps of Saint Stephen", where he announced a new ten-point program outlining the party's key priorities for the upcoming political season. On 7 September 2025, Magyar organised his ninth major event in Kötcse, coinciding with Prime Minister Viktor Orbán's traditional annual speech held in the same village. Before arriving in Kötcse, Magyar visited Balatonőszöd, the site where Prime Minister Ferenc Gyurcsány's delivered the Őszöd speech, symbolically walking from there to Kötcse. In his address, Magyar criticised both Orbán and Gyurcsány for their ties with Russian President Vladimir Putin, stating that "one embraced Putin from the left, the other from the right." During the rally, the Tisza Party officially launched its campaign for the 2026 parliamentary elections and introduced Ágnes Forsthoffer as the party's third vice-president.

Magyar announced his tenth major rally, called the "National March", for 23 October 2025, again, commemorating the anniversary of the 1956 Hungarian Revolution. The march began at Deák Square and proceeded along Andrássy Avenue to Heroes' Square in Budapest. Magyar announced the launch of the final nationwide tour of the Tisza Party before the 2026 parliamentary elections, called "The Road to Victory". On 13 December 2025, Magyar held the eleventh large-scale public demonstration, focusing on child protection. The protest followed the release of recordings by Péter Juhász allegedly showing children being abused in Hungarian residential care institutions. Demonstrators marched from Deák Square to the Carmelite Monastery. Participants carried plush toys as a symbolic gesture, later placing them in a pile in front of Magyar's podium. During his speech, Magyar presented child-protection policy proposals of the Tisza Party.

On 15 March 2026, during the national holiday commemorating the Hungarian Revolution of 1848, Magyar held the twelfth and the final large demonstration of the Tisza Party before the 2026 parliamentary elections. The event, also titled the "National March", followed the same route as the party's demonstration on 23 October 2025, starting from Deák Ferenc Square and ending at Heroes' Square in Budapest. Singer Erzsébet Csézi, who is the Tisza Party's parliamentary candidate in Borsod-Abaúj-Zemplén County's 7th constituency, performed at the event. During his speech, Magyar took a symbolic oath together with supporters, stating that the party was ready to govern. At the end of the rally, the party's 106 individual parliamentary candidates and several policy experts appeared on stage. According to Magyar's estimate, around 500,000 people attended the demonstration.

=== One million steps ===
On 9 May 2025, Prime Minister Orbán delivered a speech at the Tihany Abbey, later referred to as the "Tihany Speech". During his address, he expressed his support for George Simion, the winner of the first round of the 2025 Romanian presidential election. The speech sparked widespread reactions: Hunor Kelemen, president of the Democratic Alliance of Hungarians in Romania (RMDSZ), criticised Orbán's statement and urged ethnic Hungarian voters in Transylvania to support Nicușor Dan in the second round.

In response, on 14 May 2025, Magyar gave a speech in front of St. Stephen's Basilica in Budapest, launching the initiative titled "One Million Steps". He announced that he would walk from Budapest to Oradea (Nagyvárad), symbolically linking Hungary and Transylvania. Magyar reached Oradea on 24 May 2025, where he delivered a speech in the courtyard of the Oradea Fortress, in front of the statue of Saint Ladislaus.

=== ATV interview ===
In June 2024, Magyar appeared on the ATV program Egyenes Beszéd, hosted by Egon Rónai. During the interview, Rónai questioned Magyar about his earlier claim that he had never been invited to ATV's programs. According to Rónai, the channel had invited him several times, but he had declined the invitations. Following the exchange, Magyar left the studio before the interview had concluded.

=== 2026 parliamentary election ===
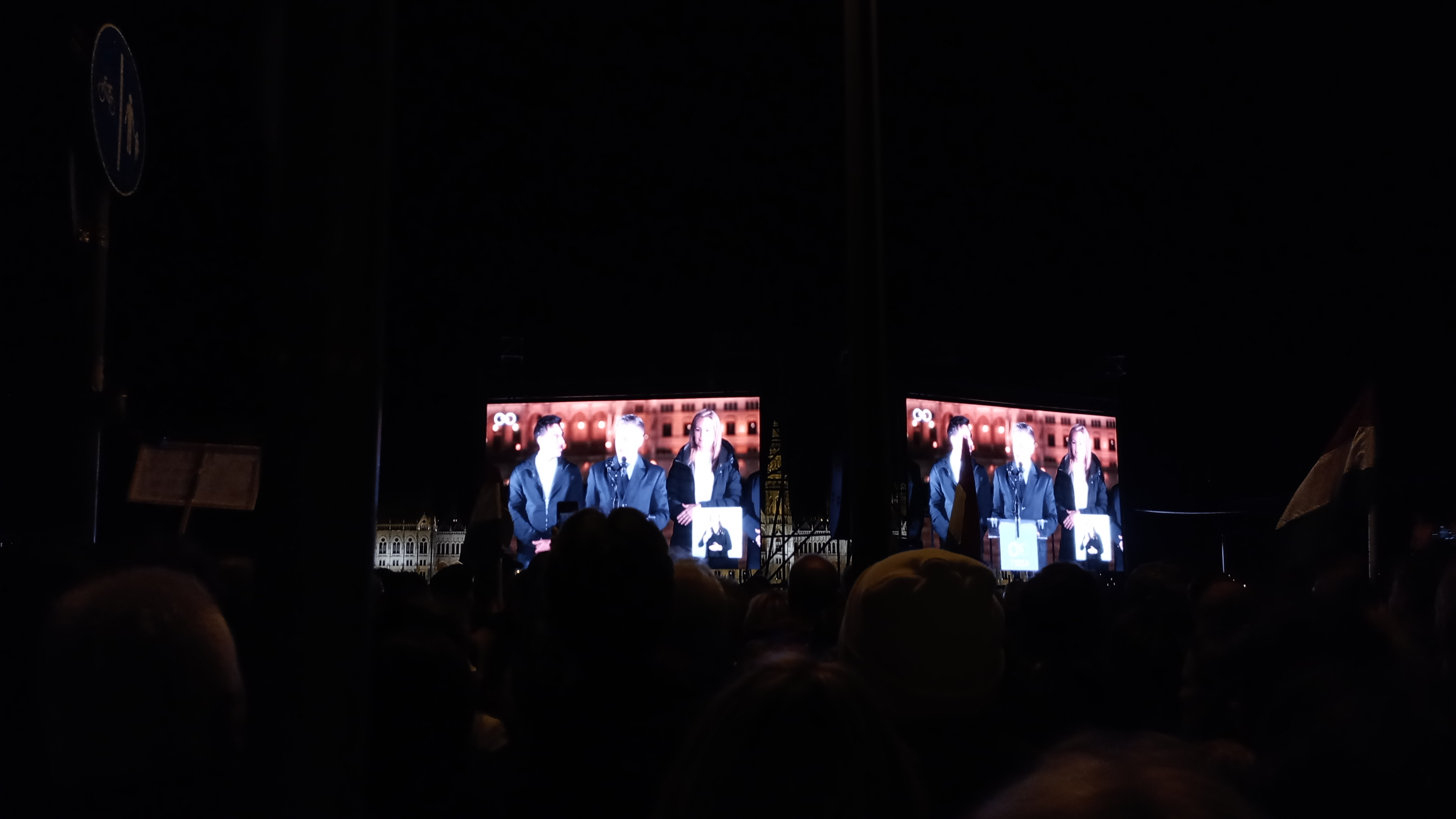
Péter Magyar's 2026 victory speech, livestreamed on large video displays

Magyar led Tisza into the parliamentary elections held on 12 April 2026. Tisza swept Fidesz from power in a landslide victory. The party won 141 seats, enough for a two-thirds supermajority that would empower Magyar's government to amend the constitution without the need for support from other parties. In terms of percentage of seats controlled, it is the largest mandate for a Hungarian party in a free election. The election had a high turnout, with more than 79% of voters taking part in the election, the highest turnout since the change of system.

== Premiership (2026–present) ==
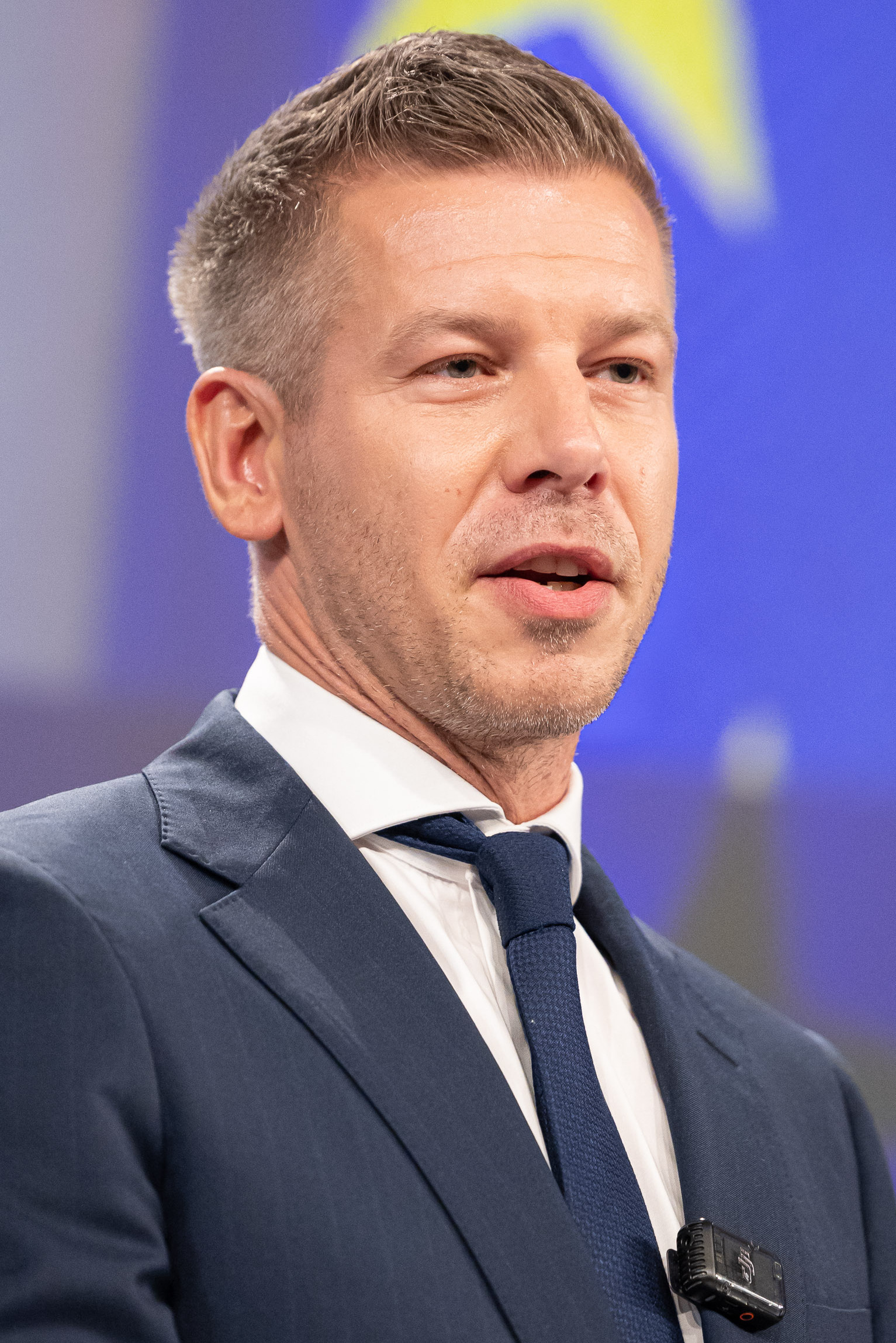
- Premiership of Péter Magyar; 9 May 2026 – present
- President: Tamás Sulyok; Ágnes Forsthoffer (acting); András Baka
- Cabinet: Magyar government
- Party: TISZA

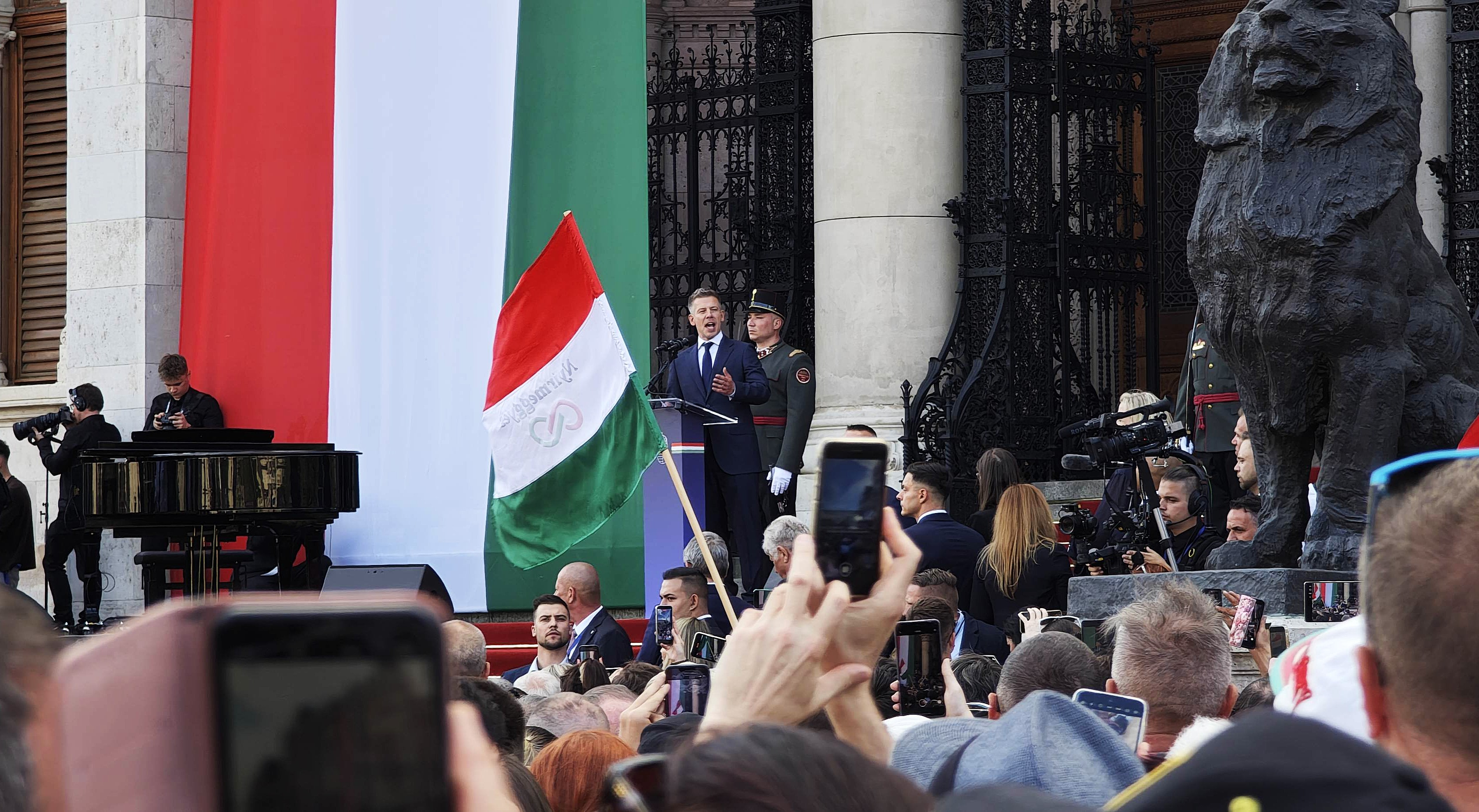
Magyar's speech on the occasion of the establishment of the National Assembly in the Kossuth Square on 9 May 2026

In his first press conference as the presumptive prime minister, Magyar laid out an ambitious reform programme, saying, "Our two-thirds mandate allows us to do a lot." He planned to undo Orbán's measures that eroded "the rule of law" and "the system of checks and balances." He also planned significant amendments to the constitution, proposing a limit of two terms (eight years) for the prime minister's post. Magyar was appointed to the position of Prime Minister by the National Assembly on 9 May 2026. His government was officially sworn in three days later. Notably, Magyar nominated his brother-in-law, Márton Melléthei-Barna, as the next justice minister, who later withdrew before the swearing-in of the new government due to backlash. Márta Görög was nominated instead.

During his tenure, Magyar has signalled his intent for tax reform against "Orban's oligarchs" in what he referred to in a post on social media website X as "not a punishment but a sign of social justice and solidarity in a functioning and humane country". His government has also planned to phase out the fuel-price cap which had been put in place by Orbán's government in March, after developments had taken place in the 2025–2026 Iran–United States negotiations. As highlighted during his election promises, Magyar also announced in August 2026 during his premiership that his government will raise the minimum old age pension from 28,500 forint (US$91.55) to 120,000 forint (US$385.47), effective January 2027.

Notably, Magyar and his government had also led the response to a record decrease of water levels in the Danube river, which had almost led to the complete shutdown of the Paks Nuclear Power Plant for the first time in its 44 years of service, as Magyar warned that the country's energy supply could be "critical" due to the shutdown and the ongoing heatwave. With Magyar urging residents and companies to reduce their power consumption, he also called for the sinking of barges and the construction of a bed sill on a section of the Danube to avoid a complete shutdown of the power plant.

=== Domestic policy ===
==== Reform of public media ====
Magyar detailed plans to suspend news coverage on Duna Media, Hungary's public service broadcaster. In two intense interviews on public radio and television, Magyar likened the broadcaster's news coverage to Nazi and North Korean propaganda, saying that "every Hungarian deserves a public service media that broadcasts the truth." In a later Facebook post, he said the suspension would last "until its public service character is restored." He claimed that he had been blocked from appearing on public service television or radio since September 2024. Reporters Without Borders had consistently raised concerns about the media landscape in Hungary, where Fidesz loyalists control an estimated 80% of the country's media. The state media of Hungary had referred to Magyar as "a puppet of Brussels, an absentee father and a traitor".

In June 2026, Magyar and the Tisza Party submitted a proposal to overhaul public media. The provisions included are the restructuring of both MTVA (the entity that oversees all forms of public media in Hungary) and Magyar Távirati Iroda (MTI), the enactment of the Independent Public Media Committee to oversee the actions and finances of public media companies in Hungary, and the reform of the Public Media Council for better transparency and to crackdown on conflicts of interest. On 7 July 2026, the country's main public channel M1 was briefly taken off the air as part of a change in management, displaying an on-air apology promising that it would be "trustworthy and independent" in the future; the channel was repositioned back to being a generalist channel (as it was prior to 2015, when it had been made a news channel), with news programming to be relaunched in the future.

==== Removal of Sulyok and new presidential appointment ====
In a meeting with President Tamás Sulyok, Magyar urged Sulyok to resign, calling him "unworthy of representing the unity of the Hungarian nation". He has also called for the resignation of the top officials in Hungary's two highest courts (audit office and competition and media authorities) and the incumbent Chief Prosecutor of Hungary. Magyar set a deadline of 31 May for their resignation. With the deadline passed and Sulyok stating his refusal to resign from the position, Magyar threatened legal action and highlighted his intent to "inform... Tisza's lawmakers about our legislative proposals today and we will immediately start the necessary procedures". Magyar subsequently pledged as part of his anti-graft reforms to amend the constitution to remove him from office and that the Hungarian Parliament will elect a new president for a maximum term of five years once Sulyok is removed.

In July 2026, Magyar's proposed reforms were approved by the Parliament, as the amendment to oust Sulyok from the presidency was voted in favor by a margin of 139–6. Sulyok was allocated a deadline of five days to sign the proposal into law or refer it to the Constitutional Court for review. Magyar stated that his failure to do so would lead to the government initiating an impeachment process against Sulyok. Sulyok signed the amendment, removing him from office on 20 July 2026.

With Ágnes Forsthoffer serving as acting president after Sulyok's removal, Magyar personally nominated chess grandmaster Judit Polgár to serve as president, though she declined the role by stating that she did not "feel enough strength within me to take on the responsibility of uniting a divided nation". Ultimately, Magyar and the Tisza Party nominated András Baka to the presidency in August 2026, citing his "attached paramount importance to the principle of separation of powers, [and] consistently standing up for the rule of law and judicial independence" as the reason for his recommendation to the position. Baka, who previously served as president of the Supreme Court from 2009 until his removal in 2011 during the Orbán era, was elected with 140 votes in favour and 6 votes against by the parliament to serve as president of Hungary, with representatives of Fidesz notably boycotting the vote in protest.

During Baka's presidency, Magyar notably blocked the nomination of Zoltán Szathmáry to the vacant position of prosecutor general, as a result of Szathmáry's brother working for the Constitution Protection Office, and who is currently suspected as an involved party in the "Gold Convoy" affair in March 2026. Magyar and his party ultimately approved Baka's second nominee, Péter Fejes, as the new prosecutor general.

==== Political reform ====
With his two-thirds supermajority, Magyar and his government submitted an amendment to the constitution in order to limit the prime minister to a total of eight years (equivalent to two full parliamentary terms) in office, whether successive or separated. The amendment was overwhelmingly approved on 15 June 2026 by a vote of 135–50 (with 6 abstentions), which marked the 16th time the Fundamental Law of Hungary had been changed since its enactment in 2011. With the amendment restricting prime ministers elected since 1990 from serving more than two terms, the Orbán-inaugurated Sovereignty Protection Office had also been effectively removed as the amendment scrapped the need of an independent agency to "protect Hungary's constitutional identity".

In June 2026, Magyar labeled his political and economical reforms as "Operation Cleansing Fire", which is set to introduce an age limit of 70 years for judges at the Constitutional Court, limiting terms of lawmakers to 12 years of service, and allowing judges with final approval from lawmakers to initiate the removal of heads of the Curia (Supreme Court) and the National Office for the Judiciary. It also included plans for a new or significantly revised constitution. In response to Magyar's political reforms, outsiders have criticized the speed and scale to demolish the institutions left behind from Orbán's rule, with Human Rights Watch highlighting that the process may "undermine the rule of law".

In July 2026, Magyar and his government submitted a bill to parliament to enact the National Asset Recovery and Protection Office (NVVH), which is an independent body to probe graft and one in which Magyar referred to as a "pillar of his anti-corruption drive". With parliament appointing political scientist Anna Unger as head of the office, controversy arose over Unger's credentials and her statement of it being "folly to expect legally binding verdicts in any major corruption cases during the NVVH's first six-year term". Despite the criticism, Magyar defended her appointment on Facebook by stating that "nobody promised people they could vote for the leader of the NVVH as if it was a [reality TV] casting show". Little activity was reported from the organisation until the end of September, where the parliament voted to lift the immunity and detain two Fidesz politicians suspected of corruption; former minister for culture and innovation Balázs Hankó and former minister of national development Miklós Seszták. In late October, György Matolcsy, former governor of the Hungarian National Bank, was detained due to suspected fraud related to missing bank funds.

In November 2026, with Viktor Orbán's brother, Áron, being detained for suspected human trafficking and influence peddling, and the NVVH recovering approximately US$19.5 million in cash that had been buried in forests during a probe relating to Seszták, Magyar highlighted in regards to the latter incident that "as of today, Viktor Orbán is a proven mafia boss. A fallen mafia boss. And Fidesz is a criminal organization."

==== Social issues ====
In a poll carried out days after Magyar's election win, more than 70% of his voters expressed support of protecting LGBTQ rights in Hungary; professor Judit Takács noted that Magyar consistently avoided invoking "ideological, identity-politics-related issues" in his campaign in order to appeal to a wide electorate.

Shortly after the election, the European Court of Justice struck down the Orbán-era "child protection law" that prohibited the distribution of materials promoting homosexuality, gender identity, or gender transition among minors, ruling that infringed upon freedom of expression and fundamental rights. In September 2026, Magyar stated that his government would move to repeal some of the anti-LGBTQ policies passed under Orbán, including amending the child protection law to comply with the ECJ ruling, and lifting a ban on adoption by same-sex couples.

In November 2026, Magyar announced his intention to reform the rules of abortion in Hungary, making it easier to access contraception pills and repeal the heartbeat bill, which required women to listen to the fetal heartbeat before going through with an abortion. Magyar also announced the government's plan to ratify the Istanbul Convention, stating that "We are proposing a comprehensive package of measures to curb all forms of violence against women, for the safety and dignity of Hungarian women."

=== Foreign policy ===
Ten days after his inauguration, Magyar made his first international trip to Poland to meet the country's prime minister Donald Tusk, and to improve overall Hungary–Poland relations. Later that month, Magyar secured a deal with the president of the European Commission Ursula von der Leyen on unlocking €16.4 billion (US$18.9 billion) in funds for the Hungarian economy, subject to Magyar's government passing reforms to combat corruption.

In September 2026, it was announced that the European Commission submitted a proposal to release a further €4.2 billion in cohesion funding, stating in a press release that "it considers that Hungary has addressed the rule of law breaches affecting the EU budget". On 13 October 2026, it was reported that the release of funding had been approved.

Under his government, Magyar initiated Hungary's entry to the European Public Prosecutor's Office (EPPO) in order to uphold his commitment to unlocking the rest of the funding held by the European Union.

== Political views ==
=== Ideology ===
Magyar is often described as conservative liberal, and Hungarian nationalist, combining market-oriented economic views with an emphasis on civic responsibility, rule of law, and national culture. Magyar has frequently stated that his movement seeks to move beyond the "old left–right divide" in Hungarian politics. He has also described himself as a "critical" pro-European. During the 15 March 2025 national commemoration, and the seventh major demonstration, Magyar wore a traditional Bocskai suit, a style often associated with conservative and patriotic symbolism in Hungary. His choice of attire was widely interpreted as a gesture towards national tradition and cultural heritage.

=== Immigration ===
Magyar has been critical of the European Union's failure to manage immigration and integration issues, reflecting that the European approach to the 2015 migration crisis had been an error. In April 2026, Magyar stated "we will keep the southern border fence ... and patch up the holes." He later went on to say Hungary would not accept the mandatory relocation mechanism, supporting other methods of enhancing European border security instead. Magyar also strongly criticised the previous Fidesz government for planning the release of 2,200 human traffickers. The Tisza election manifesto pledged to sharply curtail the foreign guest-worker programme, which will be pared back by mid-2026. This was criticised by Hungarian business leaders.

=== European Union ===
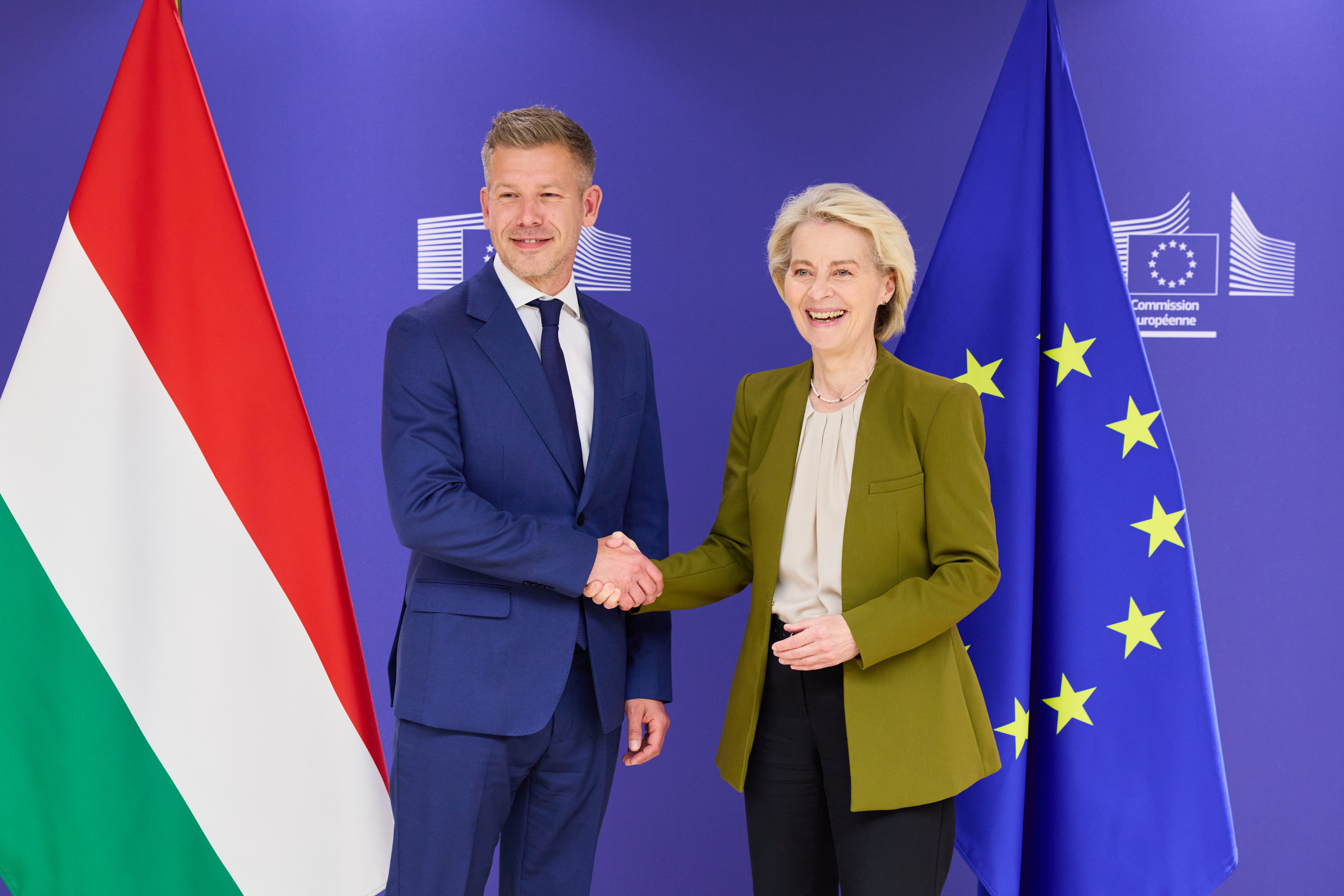
Magyar with President of the European Commission Ursula von der Leyen

Magyar defines himself as pro-European, supporting deeper cooperation within the EU and alignment with Western democratic values. He has criticized the Orbán government's confrontational stance toward EU institutions and its close relations with Russia.

Magyar has expressed support for adopting the euro in Hungary once the necessary economic conditions are met. He argues that adopting the common currency would strengthen financial stability and Hungary's position within the European Union (EU).

During the campaign, Magyar attempted to strike a delicate balance between taking a more assertive, critical position towards Russia (in contrast to Orbán's pro-Russia stance) – vowing to end Hungary's dependence on Russian energy, backing humanitarian support for Ukraine and denouncing Russian aggression – while at the same time actively working to dispel Orbán's accusations that he and the Tisza party "are coordinating efforts to bring a pro-Ukraine government to power in Hungary."

In a 2024 interview, Magyar expressed concern about the accelerated accession of Ukraine to the EU, claiming that the way the country was granted candidate status "does not correspond to the values, principles, or regulations of the European Union in any way," and that together with calls for Ukraine joining NATO, this would risk further escalation and "increase the chances of World War III".

While not outright opposed to accession of Ukraine to the EU, Magyar opposes fast-tracking Ukraine's EU accession and wants its membership put to a binding referendum. Magyar's positions are closer to the European mainstream than Orban's, although he has stopped short of endorsing more decisive forms of support. Magyar said his government would "seek balanced relations with the Russian Federation."

=== Ukraine ===
Magyar supported improving relations with Ukraine and expressed optimism about reaching an agreement with President Volodymyr Zelenskyy regarding the rights of the Hungarian minority in Ukraine, particularly in the areas of language, education and cultural rights. He indicated that progress on minority rights could help remove Hungarian objections to Ukraine's accession talks with the European Union. At the same time, Magyar stated that Hungary would continue to refrain from sending weapons or troops to Ukraine. In October 2026, Magyar welcomed the submission of draft legislation to the Ukrainian parliament on strengthening the educational rights of its country's ethnic Hungarian minority, stating in a post on Facebook that the bill "strengthens the legal guarantees of education in the Hungarian language, and the network of educational institutions." The bill was subsequently passed by the Ukrainian parliament and signed into law by Zelenskyy later in the month, allowing Ukraine to advance its bid towards membership in the European Union, with Magyar welcoming the move by stating that it was "the first step in restoring mutual trust" between the two countries.

=== Israel ===
Unlike Orbán, Magyar stated that Hungary would not automatically veto European Union decisions concerning Israel, but would instead assess each proposal on a case-by-case basis. He also described Israel as an important partner and pledged to maintain a policy of zero tolerance toward antisemitism.

In April 2026, Magyar stated that Hungary would be required to arrest Israeli Prime Minister Benjamin Netanyahu if he entered the country while subject to an International Criminal Court (ICC) arrest warrant. He also supported continued Hungarian membership in the ICC and compliance with the Rome Statute, marking a departure from the policy of former Prime Minister Viktor Orbán, whose government had opposed the warrant and initiated Hungary's withdrawal from the court.

In October 2026, incumbent President of Israel Isaac Herzog visited Budapest and met with Magyar, praising his stance against antisemitism and invited Magyar to visit Israel. Magyar stated that it "was a pleasure and a real privilege to have you here in Budapest", and pledged to visit Israel in the future.

== Public image ==
=== Appearance ===
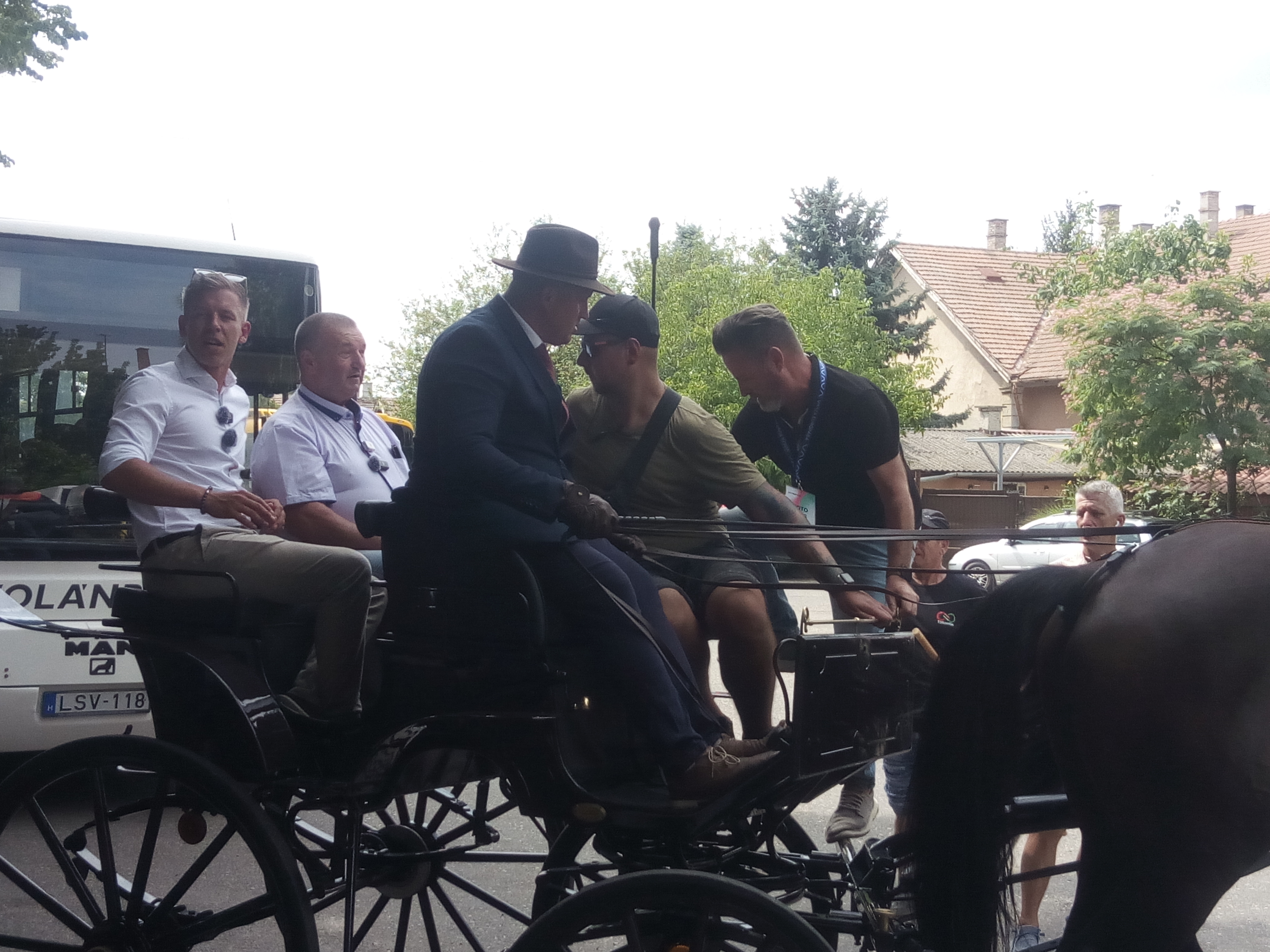
Magyar (far left) at Mezőhegyes on a horse carriage in 2025

Hungarian media has commented on Magyar's appearance and clothing. He has a distinct casual style, consisting of a white shirt or t-shirt, jeans or chinos and white sneakers, which supporters have copied at some events. Magyar has also leaned into the commentary around his clothing and accessories, auctioning off his luxury sunglasses to charity.

=== Social media ===
Magyar's social media presence, especially on Facebook, has been an important part of his appeal. His initial popularity has been linked to an interview with the YouTube channel Partizán in February 2024, which gained over a million views.

== Personal life ==
Magyar met Judit Varga on 1 April 2005 at a party. They married in 2006 and have three sons. One of their sons' godfather is Fidesz politician Gergely Gulyás, who served as Minister of the Prime Minister's Office from 2018 to 2026 and briefly led the Fidesz faction in the National Assembly in 2026. The family lived in Brussels for several years before returning to Budapest when Varga was tapped for a position in the Ministry of Justice, which she led from 2019 to 2023. The couple announced their divorce in March 2023. After their separation, Magyar dated Evelin Vogel, the sister of Olympic champion Soma Vogel, until 2024. His brother-in-law is Márton Melléthei-Barna, who married to Magyar's sister in September 2025 and serves as Tisza Party member of the National Assembly.

In July 2025, as required by a law enacted by the Fidesz government, Magyar made public a declaration of his assets, which included four plots of land (two apartments, one garage, and one vacant plot), as well as investments, savings, and cash worth 86.4 million forints (253,000 USD as of July 2025).

=== Domestic abuse allegations ===
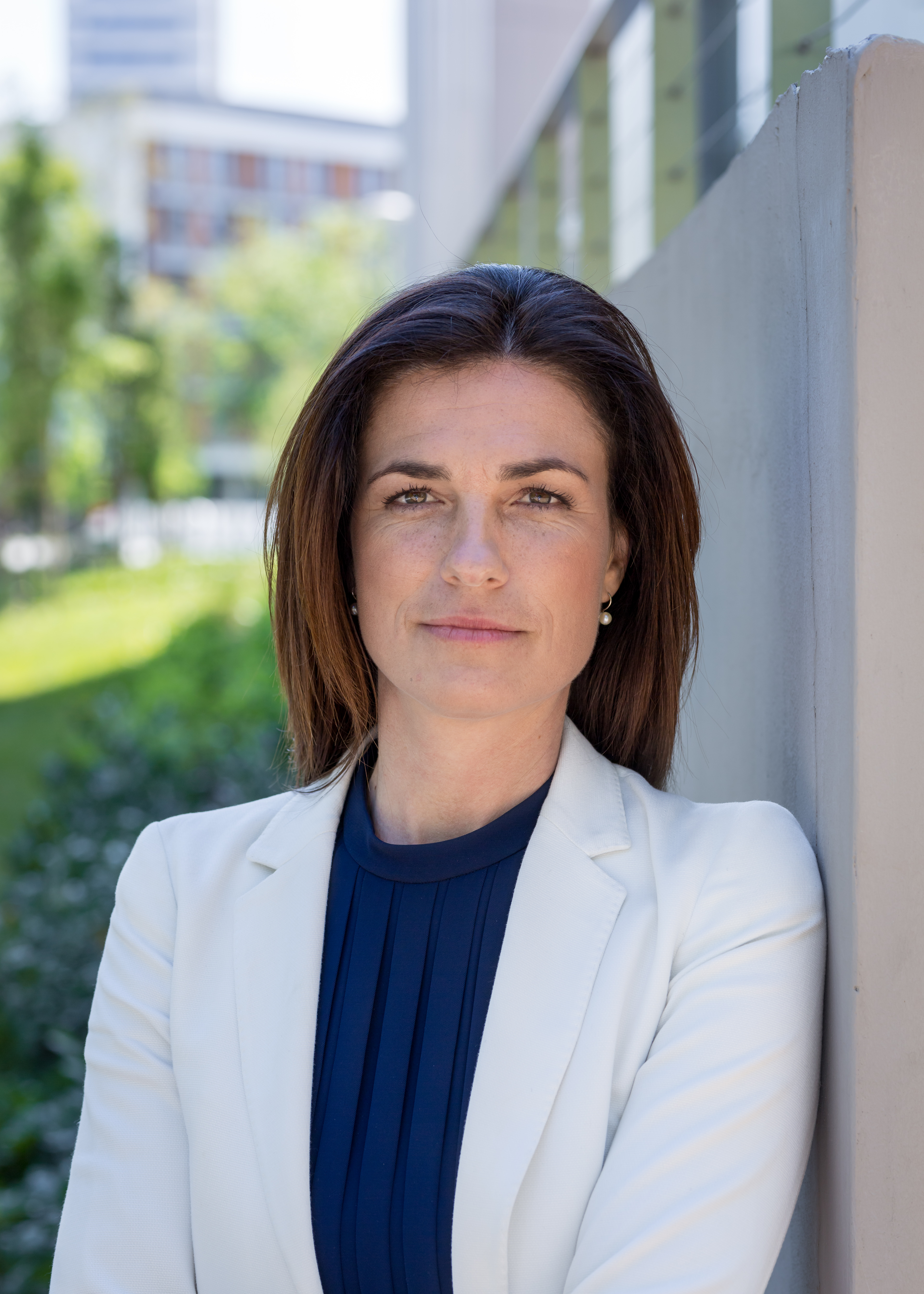
Judit Varga, ex-wife of Péter Magyar

The same day (in March 2024) that Péter Magyar leaked the recording on which Judit Varga discusses Rogán's role in the Schadl–Völner case, Varga published two posts on Facebook alleging that Magyar had verbally and physically abused her throughout their marriage. She also claimed that the statements she made on the leaked recording had been coerced during an interaction with Magyar in which she felt threatened. Later that evening, the YouTube channel Frizbi TV released an interview with Varga in which she went into more detail about her allegations, including that at various times Magyar had locked her in a room without her consent, pushed her against a door while she was pregnant, and walked around their shared residence brandishing a knife; once he faked suicide, but when the ambulance arrived, he drove off in his pyjamas and Varga had to send the medics off.

Magyar called the accusations slander and said Varga was being blackmailed by the government. According to him, government media wanted to divert attention from the audio recording by committing character assassination against him. According to the pro-government magazine Mandiner, a police report said Magyar behaved aggressively, intimidating and threatening towards his wife and police officers, when she attempted to take away his children with the help of police officers who were bodyguards due to Varga's job. Magyar also allegedly threatened to call the news media at one point. They had a heated argument at their home, and Magyar attempted to prevent her from going to a second home where the children were present, claiming the police were attempting to kidnap his children. He tried to record the events on his phone, but was stopped by the police. In the end, Magyar went home, and Varga took the children to their grandparents. Magyar said the police report was 90% a lie but that the police officer in question committed a crime by keeping him from seeing his children. In July 2025, Varga repeated the accusations, and accused her ex-husband of betrayal.

=== Phone-throwing incident ===
In September 2026, at Magyar's own request, the National Assembly voted, by a margin of 139–0, to remove Magyar's political immunity for the duration of his time in office. Tisza initiated this vote in response to prosecutors investigating a June 2024 incident at a Budapest nightclub in which Magyar allegedly approached a man filming him and threw his phone into the Danube.

Magyar called the accusations, which are linked to two Orbán-era ministers, an "attempt at political character assassination…that has already failed several times.” In a later Facebook post, he added that "nobody with nothing to hide fears standing before the law.”

== Notes ==
Party political offices
Preceded by Attila Szabó	President of the Tisza Party; 2024–present	Incumbent
Political offices
Preceded by Viktor Orbán	Prime Minister of Hungary; 2026–present	Incumbent
