= Márton Melléthei-Barna =

Hungarian politician

Member of the National Assembly
- Incumbent
- Assumed office 9 May 2026
- Constituency: National list

Personal details
- Born: Márton Ádám Melléthei-Barna
- Party: TISZA
- Spouse: Anna Ilona Magyar (m. 2025)
- Relatives: Péter Magyar (brother-in-law)

Márton Ádám Melléthei-Barna is a Hungarian lawyer and politician who was elected member of the National Assembly in 2026. He previously worked at Freshfields and served as a legal representative for the Tisza Party.

== Education ==
He obtained a degree in law from the Pázmány Péter Catholic University.

== Personal life ==
In September 2025, he married jurist Anna Ilona (née Magyar), who is a sister of Prime Minister Péter Magyar.
