= Bocskai (coat) =

Traditional Hungarian garment

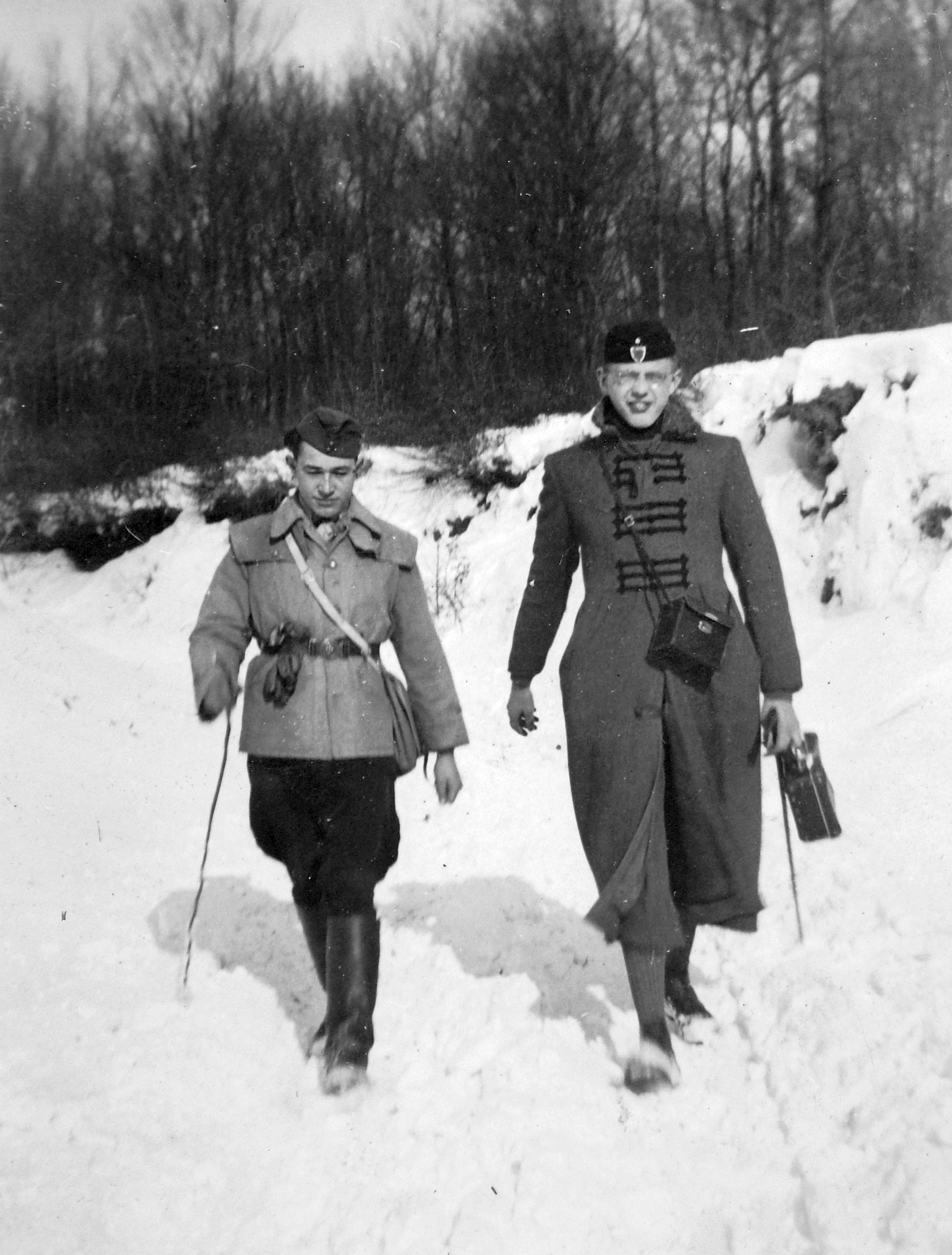
Man in Bocskai jacket (right)

Bocskai is a traditional nobleman's jacket with braids from Hungary that is worn at ceremonial functions. Named for Prince Stephen Bocskai, it has military associations and has been called dignified. It is darkly colored and decorated with ornamentation and special buttons. It has been used for ceremonial purposes. The Bocskai coat was adopted as civilian fashion beginning in the 1920s among the middle class and students. One coat purchased for a special occasion in the "Bacskai-style" was described as having opossum fur collar and silk lining. The style was described as popular at the time (1930s). Today, Bocskai style suits are appropriate attire for special occasions such as weddings or graduations.

The Bocskai was championed during the interwar years by Miklós Horthy who, despite always appearing in his Austro-Hungarian Admiral's uniform, heavily promoted it as a replacement for Western-style formal wear. Another proponent of the fashion was Hungarian writer and playwright Ferenc Ferenczy.

It was worn in the 1930s and onwards as a statement against the spread of foreign ideologies including Bolshevism and Nazism. It was primarily worn by students and by those living in Budapest.

== Péter Magyar's bocskai ==
Péter Magyar in Bocskai during the commemoration of the 1848 revolution in 2026

In the 21st Century, Péter Magyar has worn a suit that resembles traditional Hungarian Bocskai attire, although it differs in several respects. The most notable departure from the traditional design is the ornamental braiding, which replaces the conventional curled patterns with a design inspired by the Tisza Party's logo. As of October 2026, he has worn it three times to public engagements. The first was on 15 March 2025, during commemorations of the Hungarian Revolution of 1848. He wore it again on 15 March 2026, for the 2026 commemorations. The third time he wore it was on 29 August 2026, for the commemoration of the 500th anniversary of the Battle of Mohács.

== See also ==
- Bocskai uprising
- Stephen Bocskai (Istvan Bocskai to whom the Istvan Bocskai Museum is dedicated)
- Crown of Stephen Bocskai
- 5th Infantry Brigade "István Bocskai"
- Bocskai FC (Bocskai Football Club)
