= Inauguration of Péter Magyar =

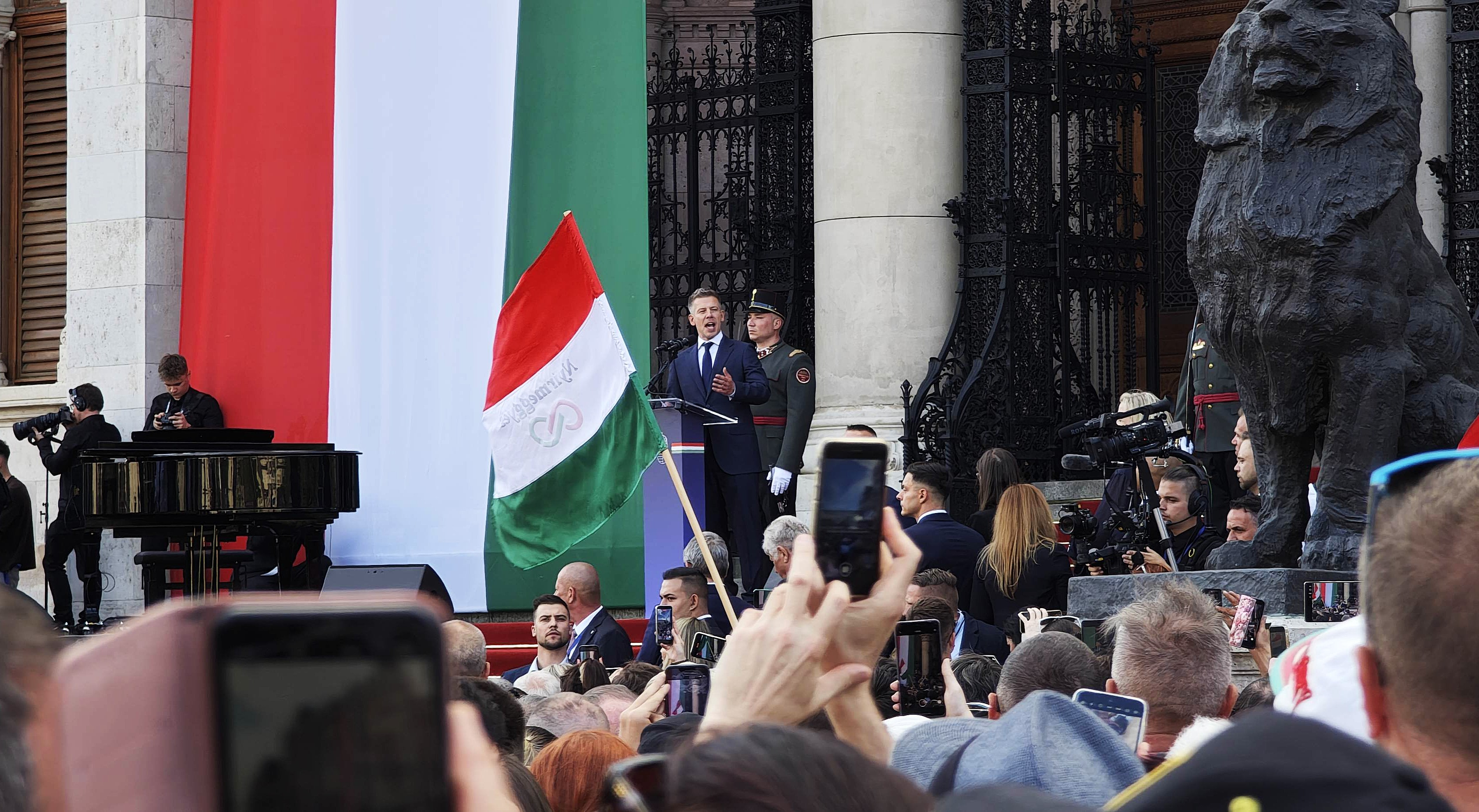
- Magyar's speech on the occasion of the establishment of the National Assembly.
- Date: 9 May 2026; 5 months ago
- Venue: Hungarian Parliament Building
- Location: Budapest, Hungary
- Participants: Péter Magyar Assuming office President of Hungary, Tamás Sulyok Nominating the prime minister candidate

The inauguration of Péter Magyar as Prime Minister of Hungary took place on Saturday, 9 May 2026, after Magyar was elected by the National Assembly.

== Background ==
Before the election, Magyar served as the leader of the opposition. Although it had remained uncertain for a long time, Magyar announced on 20 February 2026 that he would be the Tisza Party's candidate for Prime Minister. Following the party's landslide victory on 12 April 2026, Magyar ordered President Tamás Sulyok to convene the inaugural session of the National Assembly as soon as possible. The session was ultimately scheduled for 9 May 2026.

== Inaguration ==
After the members of the National Assembly elected the Speaker, appointed the parliamentary notaries, and established the parliamentary committees, President Sulyok nominated Magyar for Prime Minister. With 140 votes in favour, 54 against, and one abstention, the National Assembly elected Péter Magyar as the 60th Prime Minister of Hungary.

After taking the oath of office, Magyar delivered a speech in the chamber, during which he once again called on Sulyok to resign. At the conclusion of the inaugural session, a group of children performed the Romani anthem on the tambura, followed by the Hungarian folk song Tavaszi szél vizet áraszt. During the performance, all six members of the Our Homeland Movement walked out of the chamber, sparking considerable controversy. The session ended with performances of the European Union anthem, Ode to Joy, and the Székely anthem.

== Aftermath ==
=== National flag-raising ===
Crowd at the Kossuth Square, during the establishment of the National Assembly

After all Tisza Party MPs had walked out onto Kossuth Square, Magyar followed them as the last person to leave the chamber, accompanied by his three sons. He was then received by Gábor Böröndi, Chief of the General Staff. The commander of the ceremonial unit reported to Magyar that the unit had assembled in formation to mark the establishment of the National Assembly. Magyar then inspected the square, after which the Hungarian flag was raised. He subsequently delivered another speech.

=== Celebrartion ===
Later that day, an event titled Rendszerbontó Népünnepély (lit. 'System-Breaking People's Celebration') was also held, attracting tens of thousands of attendees. The event took the form of a celebration that continued late into the night. When the barriers were removed, the crowd flooded into the square as Ibolya Oláh performed her song "Magyarország".

On 12 April, Zsolt Hegedűs performed a dance to Jennifer Lawrence's song "The Hanging Tree". Lawrence was invited to the event as well, where Hegedűs performed the dance again.
