= Ferenc Mádl =

President of Hungary from 2000 to 2005

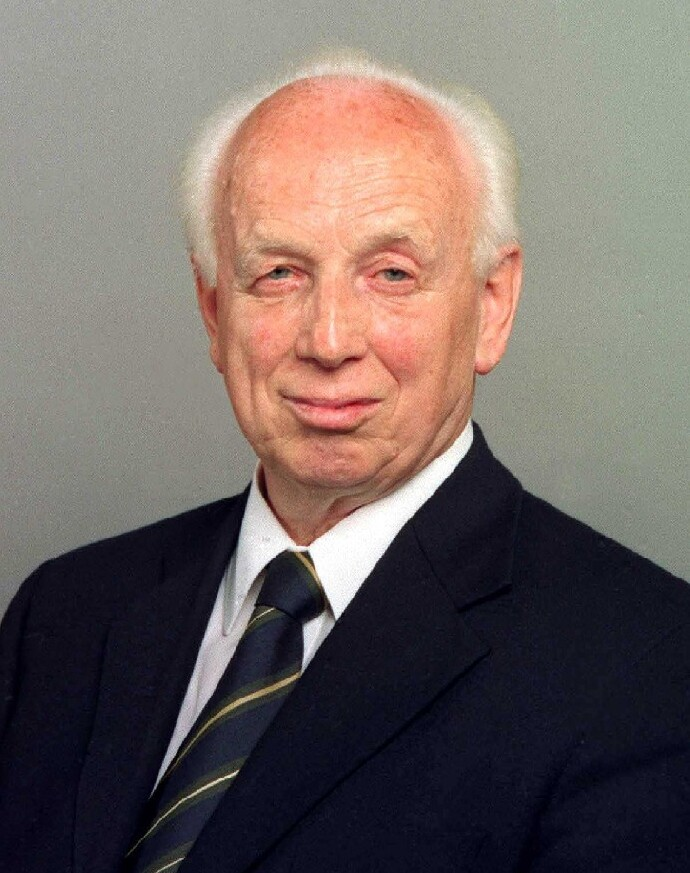
- Mádl in 2003

President of Hungary
- In office 4 August 2000 – 4 August 2005
- Prime Minister: Viktor Orbán; Péter Medgyessy; Ferenc Gyurcsány
- Preceded by: Árpád Göncz
- Succeeded by: László Sólyom

Minister of Education
- In office 22 February 1993 – 15 July 1994
- Prime Minister: József Antall; Péter Boross
- Preceded by: Bertalan Andrásfalvy
- Succeeded by: Gábor Fodor

Personal details
- Born: 29 January 1931 Bánd, Kingdom of Hungary
- Died: 29 May 2011 (aged 80) Budapest, Hungary
- Party: Independent
- Spouse: Dalma Némethy
- Children: 1
- Relatives: Pál Erőss (brother-in-law); Péter Magyar (great-nephew)
- Education: Eötvös Loránd University (JD); University of Strasbourg
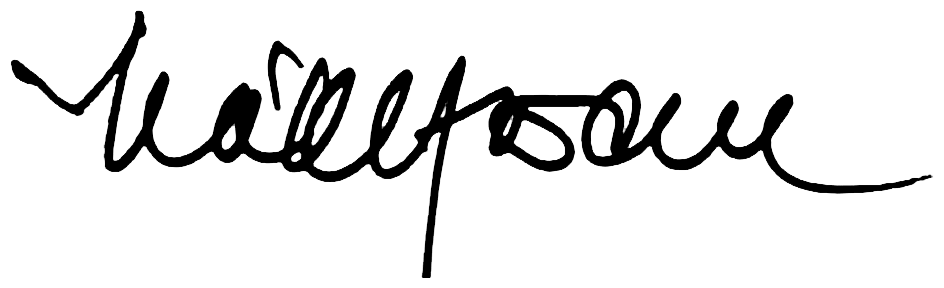
- Signature

Ferenc Mádl (Note: Hungarian pronunciation: [ˈfɛrɛnt͡s ˈmaːdl̩]) (29 January 1931 – 29 May 2011) was a Hungarian legal scholar, professor, and politician who served as President of Hungary from 2000 until 2005. Prior to that he had been minister without portfolio from 1990 to 1993 then Minister of Education from 1993 to 1994 in the conservative cabinets of József Antall and Péter Boross.

Mádl ran unsuccessfully for the position of President of Hungary in 1995, defeated by Árpád Göncz. Five years later he was elected head of state as the candidate of the governing conservative coalition.

== Early life, studies and scientific activities ==
Ferenc Mádl was born on 29 January 1931 in the village of Bánd in Veszprém County, Kingdom of Hungary into a Danube Swabian family. He was awarded a diploma from the Faculty of Law of the Eötvös Loránd University in 1955. Between 1961–1963 he studied at the faculty of international comparative law of the University of Strasbourg. He was awarded an academic degree as candidate of politics and law in 1964, and he received a doctorate in 1974 with his dissertation "The company and economic competition in the law of European economic integration". In 1987 he was elected a corresponding member of the Hungarian Academy of Sciences, and then in 1993 he was made a full member of the Academy. In his scientific activities he has primarily dealt with matters of civil law, private international law and legal problems related to international economic relations, as well as European law.

He was secretary of the Scientific Qualifying Committee between 1984–1990, from 1985 he was a member of the Harvard Academy of International Commercial Law, from 1988 a member of the steering committee of the Rome international institute (UNIDROIT) for unifying private law, while from 1989 he was appointed as a central judge on the Washington-based international selected court for states and foreign investors. Besides the aforementioned positions he held he also assisted in the editing of several scientific journals and the work of scientific organizations, and was a member of several international academies. Mádl lectured at numerous foreign universities as guest professor, and was the author of several books and studies.

== Professional career ==
From 1955 Mádl worked as a legal clerk and then as court secretary, then between 1956 and 1971 he worked as political and legal rapporteur at the Hungarian Academy of Sciences Central Office, later being promoted to head of department. From 1971 he taught at the Budapest University of Sciences Department of Civil Law as a docent, before continuing this work as university tutor from 1973. In the meantime, between 1972 and 1980 he was on the staff of the Hungarian Academy's Institute of Politics and Law, and from 1978 until 1985 he held the post of director of the Institute of Civil Sciences. He was the director of the Faculty of Private International Law of the Budapest University of Sciences from 1985 until his death in May 2011.

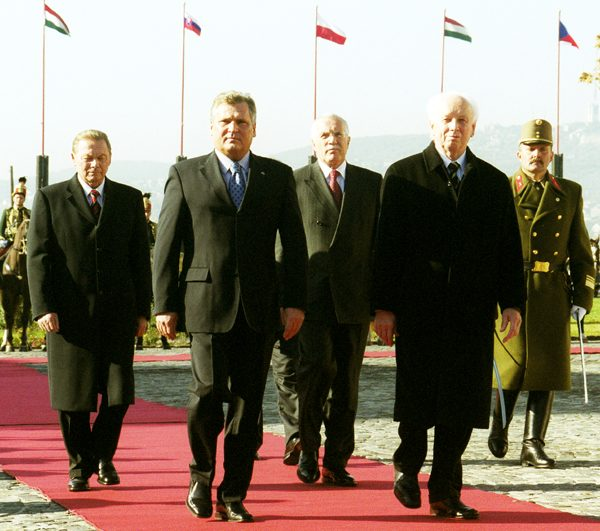
Presidents of the Visegrád Group in 2003, Budapest

He was not affiliated with any party. He undertook a role in political life after the change to democracy in 1989. From 23 May 1990 to 22 February 1993 as minister without portfolio in József Antall's government. He was charged with supervising the Hungarian Academy of Sciences; he assisted in defining government science policy goals as well as closely observing the harmonization of related state tasks and their implementation; on the basis of separate commissions he represented the government and the prime minister in international organizations; he cooperated with the ministers for justice, foreign affairs and international economic relations in the realization of certain tasks. From 1991 he also fulfilled duties as government commissioner in connection with the Bős-Nagymaros hydroelectric power plant project. At the instigation of the government, in late 1992 an inter-portfolio committee was formed under his chairmanship to research those works of art illegally taken to the former Soviet Union from Hungary during and after the Second World War, with the aim of winning their return.

He took the post of chairman of the board of directors of the State Property Agency on 1 August 1990, and from 1992 he exercised, on the authority of the government, supervisory powers over the State Bank Supervisory Authority, at the same time being appointed chairman of the Bank Supervisory Authority Committee, a role he filled until February 1993. He also exercised supervisory control over the Central Office of the Hungarian Academy of Sciences and the National Scientific Research Fund. He was appointed chairman of the government's Science Policy Committee in August 1990, and he headed the Human Resources Policy Cabinet between 1992–1993.

Between 22 February 1993 and 15 July 1994 he was minister for culture and education. Between February and July 1994 he filled the post of chairman of the Council for Higher Education and Science. Also in 1994, he was appointed chair of the National Cultural Fund. He stood as the opposition MDF-KDNP-Fidesz's nominee for President of the Republic in 1995. He had been chairman of the Hungarian Civil Cooperation Association since 1996. From 1999 he has been a member of the scientific advisory body for the Viktor Orbán government.

On 15 March 1999 he was awarded the Széchenyi Prize for his internationally recognized scientific achievements in the areas of European law, private international law and international commercial law, as well as for his higher educational and scientific organizational efforts. In September of the same year he was also honoured with the French order of the Légion d'honneur.

On 3 May 2000 he was nominated by Fidesz and the FKGP for the position of President of the Republic, which he accepted. The National Assembly of Hungary elected Ferenc Mádl President of the Republic on 6 June 2000. He was inaugurated as President of the Republic of Hungary on 4 August 2000. His duty, by Constitution, extended to 5 years. His term as President ended in 2005: he did not want to run again for the office. He was succeeded by László Sólyom, an independent candidate of the right-wing opposition, who defeated Katalin Szili in the indirect presidential election.

=== World Justice Project ===
After his presidency, Ferenc Mádl served as an Honorary Co-Chair for the World Justice Project. The World Justice Project works to lead a global, multidisciplinary effort to strengthen the Rule of Law for the development of communities of opportunity and equity.

=== Selected publications ===
- A deliktuális felelősség a társadalom és a jog fejlődésének történetében (1964)
- Az Európai Gazdasági Közösség joga (1974)
- The Law of the European Economic Community: Enterprises, Economic Competition and the Economic Function of the State in the Process of Economic Integration. Translated by Dr. J. Deczényi. Budapest: Akadémiai Kiadó. 1978. ISBN 963-05-1330-7.
- Összehasonlító nemzetközi magánjog (1978)
- The Law of Transactions (1982)
- A külgazdaság és a nemzetközi beruházások joga (1988)
- Mádl, Ferenc; Buxbaum, Richard, eds. (1989). "State and Economy". The International Encyclopedia of Comparative Law. Vol. XVII. Tübingen: Mohr Siebeck GmbH & Co. KG.
- State and Economy in Transformation (1997)
- EU Integration Process – Enlargement and Institutional Reforms (1997)
- Magyar nemzetközi magánjog és a nemzetközi gazdasági kapcsolatok joga (with Lajos Vékás, 1985–2004, 8 edition)
- Az európai örökség útjain (1995).
- Állam és gazdaság – Forradalom a jog útján a közép- és kelet-európai országokban (1997)
- Quo vadis, Európa? (2004)

== Family ==
Mádl was married to Dalma Némethy; they had one son, András and three grandchildren. His second cousin was Antal Mádl, a literary historian and teacher. Mádl was the great-uncle of Prime Minister Péter Magyar, who was the husband of former Minister of Justice Judit Varga between 2006 and 2023.

== Death ==
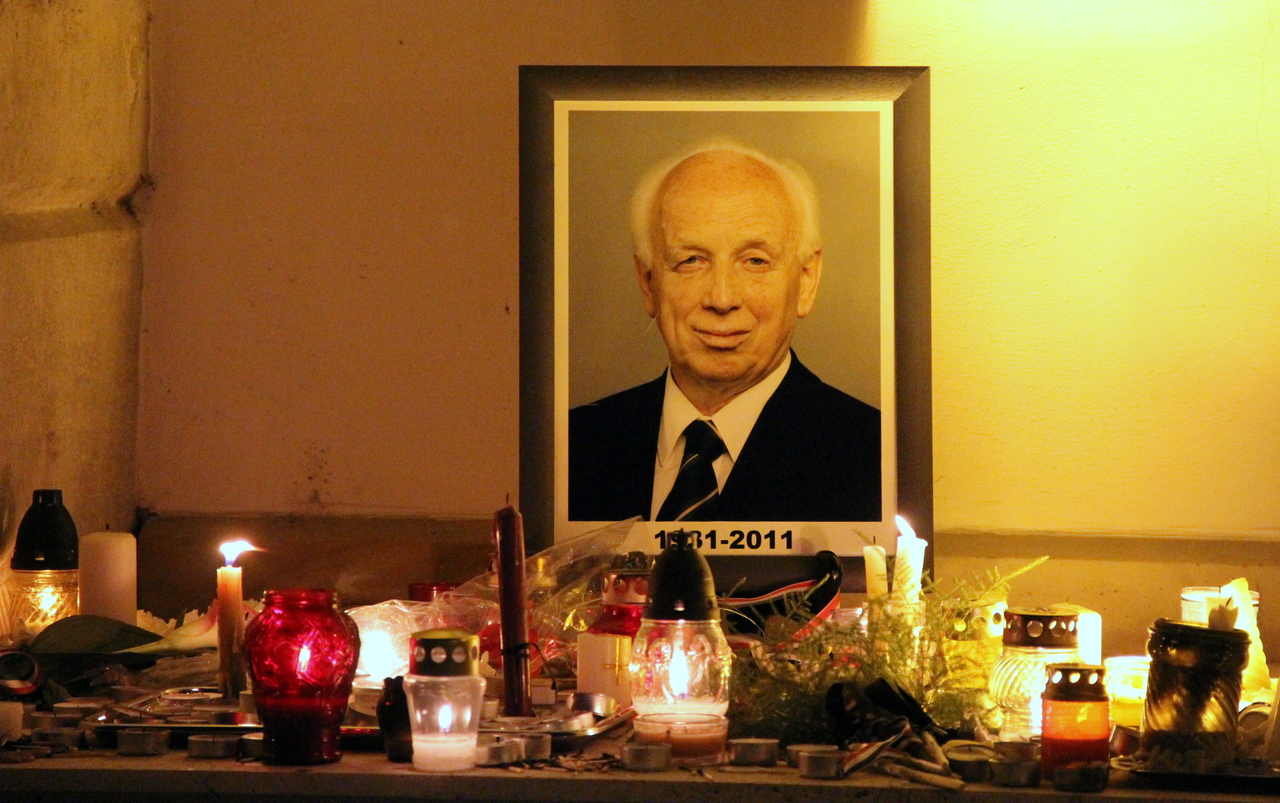
Madl funeral on 30 May 2011

Ferenc Mádl died aged 80 on 29 May 2011. Hungarian President Pál Schmitt paid tribute to Mádl upon learning of his death. A statement released by his office said, "Pál Schmitt learnt with deep sorrow of the former head of state's death, and on this day personally expressed his condolences to [Mádl's] family." Prime Minister Viktor Orbán commented on posted on his Facebook page, "We are shocked to hear the news. May he rest in peace!"

On 6 June a memorial was held for the late President at the Parliament, where legislative Speaker László Kövér said that Ferenc Mádl was a Christian man, who brought with him his faith from the village where he was raised.

He was buried in a Catholic ritual with military honours at the Fiumei Street National Cemetery on 7 June in a funeral ceremony starting at 16.30 CEST.

== Honors and awards ==
On 8 November 2002, he was awarded the Gold Medal of the Jean Monnet Foundation for Europe for his commitment to peace, liberty, justice and solidarity in Europe.

- Poland: Order of the White Eagle (26 June 2001)
- Latvia: Commander Grand Cross with Chain of the Order of Three Stars (Oct. 2001)
- Estonia: Collar of the Order of the Cross of Terra Mariana
- Croatia: Grand Cross of the Grand Order of King Tomislav (15 March 2002)
- Norway: Knight Grand Cross of the Order of St. Olav
- Italy: Knight Grand Cross with Collar of the Order of Merit of the Italian Republic (17 June 2002)
- Romania: Grand Cross with Chain of the Order of the Star of Romania (2002)
- Finland: Grand Cross with Collar of the Order of the White Rose of Finland (2002)
- Albania: On 30 January 2005 received a copy of the key of the city of Tirana on the occasion of his state visit to Albania.
- Spain: Collar of the Order of Isabella the Catholic (14 January 2005). His wife is Grand Cross of the same order.
- Slovenia: Order for Exceptional Merits (12 April 2005)
- Chile: Collar of the Order of Merit (25 September 2002)

== Notes ==
Political offices
| Preceded by Bertalan Andrásfalvy | Minister of Education; 1993–1994 | Succeeded by Gábor Fodor |
| Preceded by Árpád Göncz | President of Hungary; 2000–2005 | Succeeded by László Sólyom |
