= Order for Exceptional Merits =

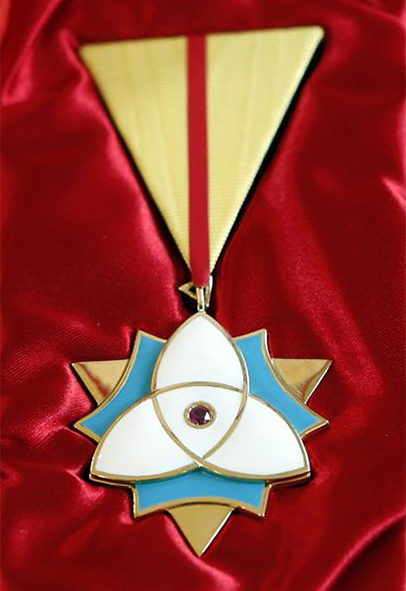
- Type: Civil decoration
- Awarded for: "exceptional work and services rendered in advancing the sovereignty, prosperity, renown and progress of Slovenia in the cultural, economic, scientific, social and political spheres"
- Presented by: the Republic of Slovenia
- Eligibility: Heads of state
- Status: Currently awarded
- Website: http://www.up-rs.si/up-rs/uprs.nsf/objave/Red-za-izredne-zasluge?OpenDocument
- Ribbon of the order

The Order for Exceptional Merits (Slovenian: Red za izredne zasluge), is a state order of the Republic of Slovenia. It is awarded usually for exceptional work and services rendered in advancing the sovereignty, prosperity, renown and progress of Slovenia in the cultural, economic, scientific, social and political spheres. It is conferred to nationals of the country and, exceptionally, groups of citizens, legal persons and other organizations and foreign top statesmen. The order is usually presented by the President of Slovenia in person.

== Notable recipients ==
- 2022 - Alexander Van der Bellen (as President of Austria)
- 2022 - Frank-Walter Steinmeier (as President of Germany)
- 2021 - Sergio Mattarella (as President of Italy)
- 2021 - Angela Merkel (as Chancellor of Germany)
- 2021 - Moon Jae-in (as President of South Korea)
- 2021 - Marcelo Rebelo de Sousa (as President of Portugal)
- 2021 - Katerina Sakellaropoulou (as President of Greece)
- 2019 - Kersti Kaljulaid (as President of Estonia)
- 2016 - Miloš Zeman (as President of the Czech Republic)
- 2015 - (Belgium) (European Union) Herman Van Rompuy (as Former President of the European Council)
- 2015 - Joachim Gauck (as President of Germany)
- 2013 - (Slovenia) Slovenian Academy of Sciences and Arts
- 2011 - Harald V of Norway (as King of Norway)
- 2011 – Queen Sonja of Norway (as Queen of Norway)
- 2011 - Giorgio Napolitano (as President of Italy)
- 2010 - Tarja Halonen (as President of Finland)
- 2009 - (Slovenia) University of Ljubljana
- 2009 - (Netherlands) Jaap de Hoop Scheffer (as Secretary General of NATO)
- 2008 - Elizabeth II (as Queen of the United Kingdom)
- 2008 - (Slovenia) France Bučar
- 2006 - Tassos Papadopoulos (as President of Cyprus)
- 2006 - Albert II (as Prince of Monaco)
- 2006 - (Slovenia) Jože Pučnik (posthumously)
- 2006 - Davíð Oddsson (as Former Prime Minister of Iceland)
- 2005 - (Italy) (European Union) Romano Prodi (as Former President of the European Commission)
- 2005 - (United Kingdom) (NATO) George Robertson, Baron Robertson of Port Ellen (as Secretary General of the North Atlantic Treaty Organization)
- 2005 - Helmut Kohl (as Former Chancellor of Germany)
- 2005 - Ferenc Mádl (as President of Hungary)
- 2004 - Carl XVI Gustaf of Sweden (as King of Sweden)
- 2004 - Queen Silvia of Sweden (as Queen of Sweden)
- 2004 - (Spain) Javier Solana (as High Representative for the Common Foreign and Security Policy)
- 2004 - (Germany) (European Union) Günter Verheugen (as European Commissioner for Enlargement)
