= Dalma Mádl =

First Lady of Hungary from 2000 to 2005

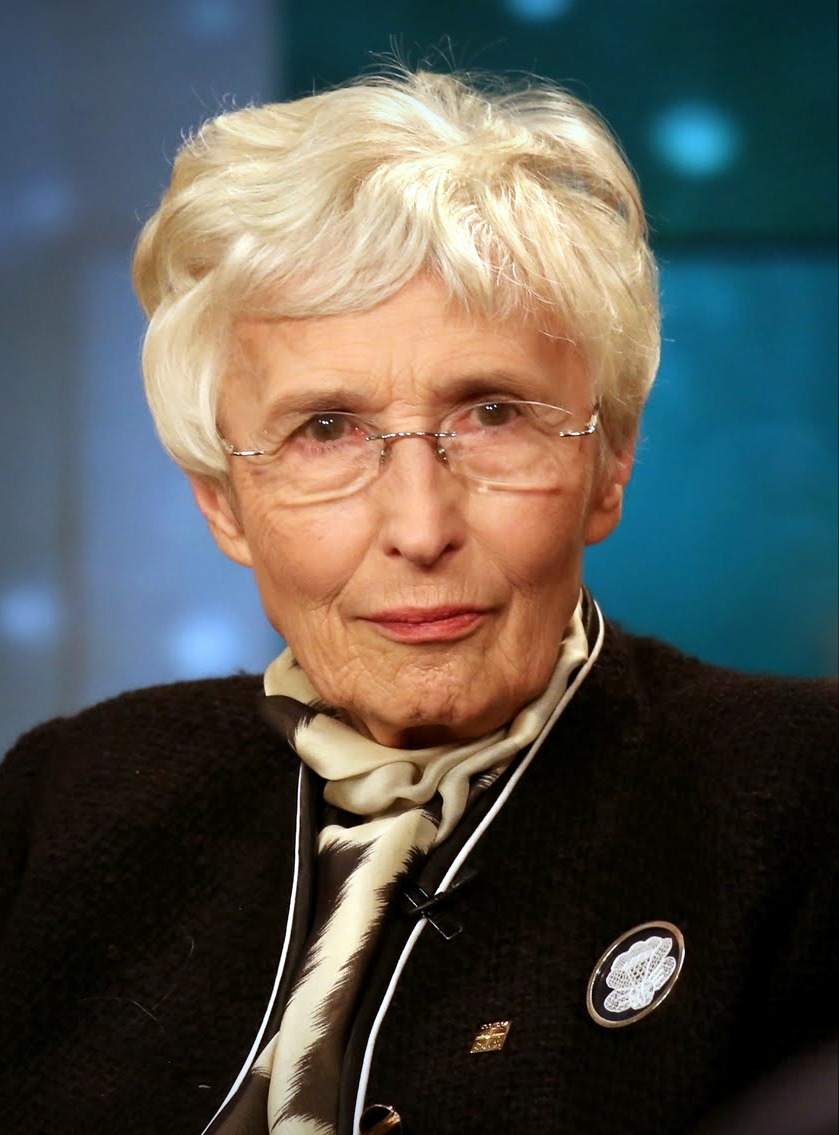
- Mádl in 2013

First Lady of Hungary
- In role 4 August 2000 – 5 August 2005
- President: Ferenc Mádl
- Preceded by: Zsuzsanna Göntér
- Succeeded by: Erzsébet Sólyom

Personal details
- Born: Dalma Némethy; 9 November 1932 Pécs, Kingdom of Hungary
- Died: 22 October 2021 (aged 88) Budapest, Hungary
- Spouse: Ferenc Mádl (m. 1955; died 2011)
- Children: 1
- Relatives: Pál Erőss (brother-in-law); Péter Magyar (great-nephew)

Dalma Mádl (née Némethy; 9 November 1932 – 22 October 2021) was the First Lady of Hungary from 2000 to 2005 and the wife of President Ferenc Mádl.

== Early life ==
Mádl was born in Pécs in 1932, the fourth child of the Némethy family. Her intellectual family sent her to Patrona Hungariae High School in Budapest. She started work at the Pediatric Hospital of Pécs in 1950.

== Career ==
She was the First Lady of Hungary from 2000 to 2005.

== Personal life and death ==
She married Ferenc Mádl in 1955.

Dalma Mádl died in Budapest at the age of 88 on 22 October 2021.

== Honours ==
- Norway: Grand Cross of the Royal Norwegian Order of Merit (2002)
- Spain: Dame Grand Cross of the Order of Isabella the Catholic (2005)

Honorary titles
Preceded by Zsuzsanna Göntér	First Lady of Hungary; 2000–2005	Succeeded by Erzsébet Sólyom
