= Tamás Freund =

Hungarian neurobiologist

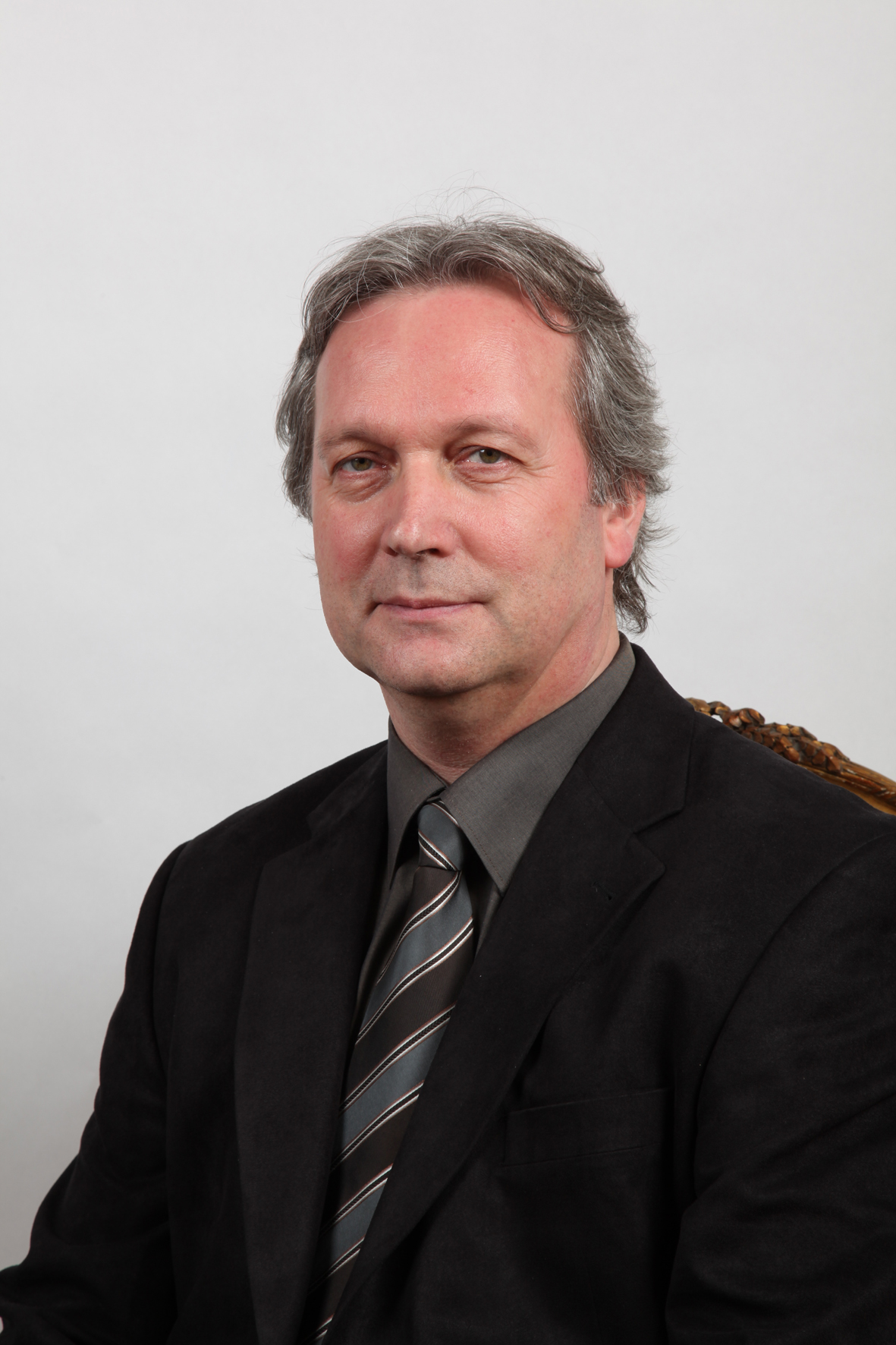
- Born: June 14, 1959 (age 67); Zirc, Hungary
- Education: Eötvös Loránd University (PhD); Hungarian Academy of Sciences (DSc)
- Known for: research into functional organization of neuronal circuits in the cerebral cortex
- Relatives: Péter Magyar (second nephew)
- Awards: 2011 Brain Prize

Tamás F. Freund (born June 14, 1959 in Zirc) is a Hungarian neurobiologist. He is president of the Hungarian Academy of Sciences and won the 2011 Brain Prize for research on the functional organization of neuronal circuits in the cerebral cortex. He also won the Széchenyi Prize.

Freund attended Eötvös Loránd University, where he received a diploma in biology in 1983 and a Doctor of Philosophy in neuroscience in 1992. He later received his Doctor of Science from the Hungarian Academy of Sciences.

Freund was also president of the Federation of European Neuroscience Societies from 2004 to 2006. As of 2011, he was director of the Institute of Experimental Medicine of the Hungarian Academy of Sciences, as well as the Head of the Department of Neurosciences at Pázmány Péter Catholic University. In 2014, he became the president of the National Brain Research Program. He was re-elected as the president of the Hungarian Academy of Science in 2023.
