= Second premiership of Viktor Orbán =

History of Hungary (2010–2026)

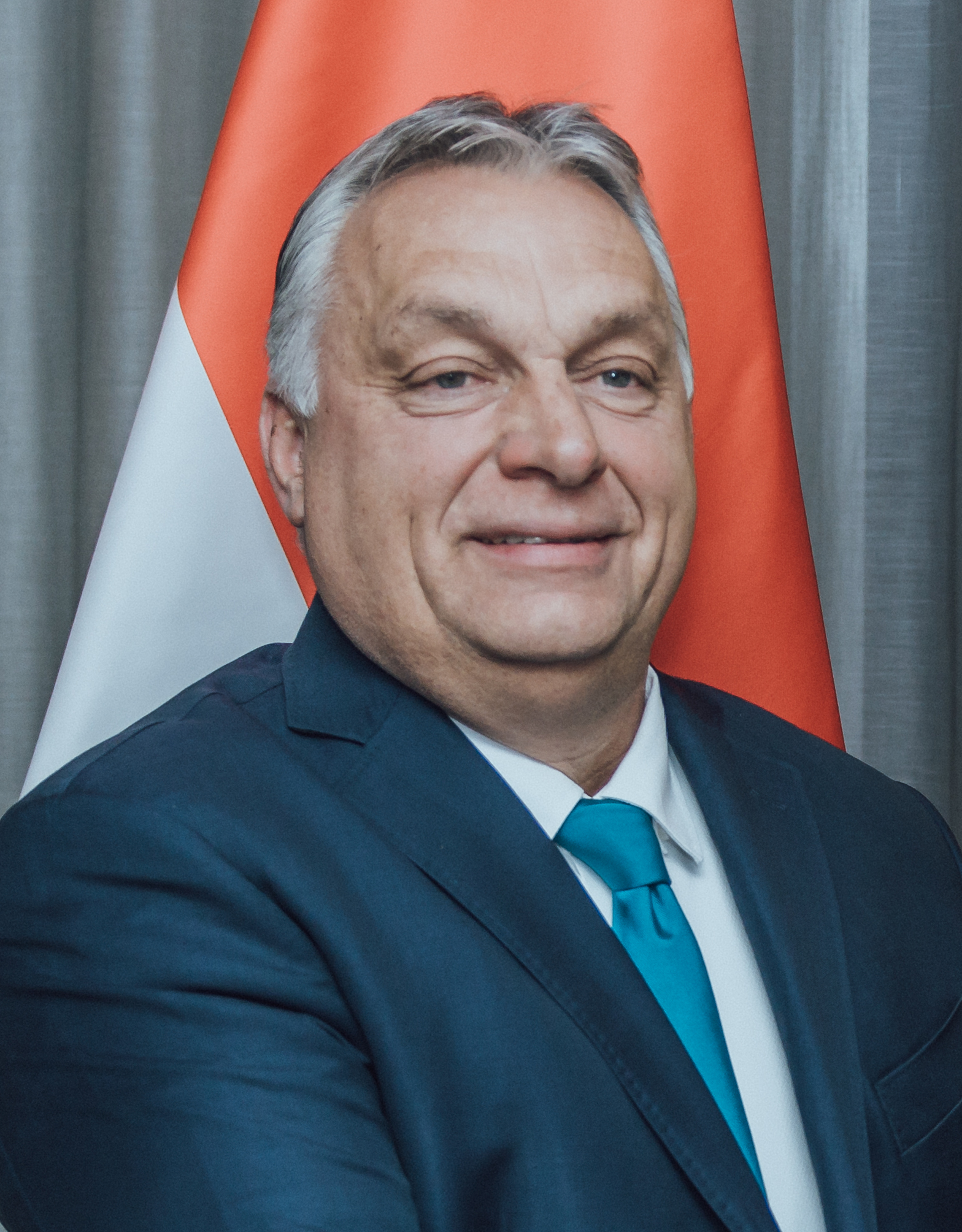
- Orbán in 2022
- System of National Cooperation; Second premiership of Viktor Orbán; 29 May 2010 – 9 May 2026 (Note: De facto until 12 April 2026)
- President: Pál Schmitt; László Kövér (acting); János Áder; Katalin Novák; László Kövér (acting); Tamás Sulyok
- Cabinet: Second Orbán Government; Third Orbán Government; Fourth Orbán Government; Fifth Orbán Government
- Party: Fidesz–KDNP
- Election: 2010 · 2014 · 2018 · 2022
- Seat: Carmelite Monastery of Buda

The Orbán system (Hungarian: Orbán-rendszer), or the Orbán regime (Hungarian: Orbán-rezsim) and the Orbán era (Hungarian: Orbán-korszak) was the second period in the history of Hungary's modern Third Republic during which Viktor Orbán served as Prime Minister of Hungary. From 2010 to 2026, Orbán's Fidesz party enjoyed a supermajority in the National Assembly in a permanent coalition with the Christian Democrats (KDNP). This supermajority allowed the Fidesz–KDNP alliance to pass constitutional amendments without seeking support from other parliamentary parties. Over these sixteen years, Orbán's and Fidesz's ideology moved steadily to the right, shifting the once-conservative-liberal, pro-European party toward Euroscepticism, right-wing populism, national conservatism, self-professed illiberalism, and Christian nationalism.

Fidesz used its parliamentary supermajority to enact wide-ranging constitutional and institutional changes that many observers characterized as constructing a hybrid regime that blended democracy with authoritarianism. Clientelism and institutional capture played a key role in Orbán's governance strategy. Within Hungary, this strategy and the establishment it created are called the System of National Cooperation (Hungarian: Nemzeti Együttműködés Rendszere), usually abbreviated to NER.

== Background ==
Orbán first served as Prime Minister of Hungary between 1998 and 2002, and returned to office in 2010 after a landslide victory by his party, Fidesz, which, formally in coalition with the Christian Democratic People's Party (KDNP), secured a supermajority in the National Assembly. This supermajority allowed Orbán's government to amend or replace key laws, restructure institutions, and redefine Hungary's political and economic framework. In July 2014, Orbán declared that Hungary was building an "illiberal state", inspired by countries such as Turkey and Russia, and argued that liberal democracy had failed to protect national sovereignty and Christian identity.

== Ideology and political model ==
The Orbán government defined itself as an "illiberal state", espousing Christian nationalism, and rejecting liberalism in general and liberal democracy in particular, while Orbán's personal ideology and ideas are called Orbánism. Scholars commonly refer to it as competitive authoritarianism or electoral autocracy, where democratic institutions formally exist but are subverted to maintain power. The government emphasised:

- National identity and cultural homogeneity through Hungarian nationalism;
- Pro-natalist and family-centric social policy over immigration-based demographics;
- State sovereignty against supranational bodies, such as the European Union, as a result of its Euroscepticism;
- Populist narratives contrasting the "people" with liberal elites and external actors such as George Soros.

== Constitutional and institutional reforms ==
Following the 2010 election, Fidesz adopted a new constitution, which entered into force on 1 January 2012. The reform restructured Hungary's state institutions:

- Constitutional Court: its powers were limited, and appointment processes aligned with the ruling majority.
- Electoral system: parliamentary seats reduced from 386 to 199 and districts redrawn, allegedly benefiting Fidesz.
- Media regulation: new bodies (National Media and Infocommunications Authority, Media Council) created under Fidesz control.
- Judiciary: court administration centralised and executive influence expanded.

The European Parliament and international watchdogs have stated that these changes weakened checks and balances and concentrated power in the executive. A 2020 constitutional amendment defined the family as the union of a father who is a man and a mother who is a woman. A 2025 constitutional amendment, the 15th adopted, declares that all Hungarians are either male or female, allows the government to strip dual nationals of their Hungarian citizenship if they are declared dangerous to the nation and enshrines the right to use cash.

== Media and civil society ==
Hungary's media landscape has become increasingly concentrated. Pro-government businessmen acquired most private outlets, later merging into the Central European Press and Media Foundation (KESMA) in 2018. Independent outlets and NGOs report censorship, advertising boycotts, and political pressure. The government also passed a "Transparency Law" in 2017 requiring foreign-funded NGOs to register as "foreign-supported," drawing comparisons to Russian foreign agent law. The Central European University relocated from Budapest to Vienna in 2019 after legal restrictions made its operation in Hungary impossible.

=== Propaganda ===
The communication of Fidesz has been widely described as populist propaganda.

Since Fidesz–KDNP's 2010 landslide victory, government-critical media organizations were removed one-by-one through legal and financial means, while oligarchs close to the government have acquired outlets. Hungary's public service broadcaster and other television channels and radio stations are united under the Media Services Support and Asset Management Fund (MTVA). Meanwhile, 476 media outlets – 80% of all Hungarian media – are operated by the Central European Press and Media Foundation (KESMA), staffed by Fidesz loyalists. The media policy of the Orbán government was based on limiting access to financial resources, undermining the independence of regulatory bodies, and hindering access to information of public interest. As a result, Hungary experiences two parallel media systems: one directly or indirectly controlled by the government, and the other being independent. Paid for by taxpayer money, Fidesz uses bought-up outlets, its social media empire, and outdoor advertising to spread manipulative and hostile disinformation.

During the 2015 European migrant crisis, a smear campaign was launched by Fidesz against George Soros, and his alleged "Soros Plan" of uncontrolled migration. Billboards across the country claimed that he wanted to settle millions of Africans and Middle Easterners in Hungary. Meanwhile, the Orbán government portrayed itself as the ones who are defending Hungary's national interests. Migrants were depicted as terrorists who spread lethal diseases, threaten local culture, and rape women. This campaign led to the 2016 migrant quota referendum, the 2017 National Consultation about the "Soros Plan", and the 2018 Stop Soros laws. The "weak West", the EU, the UN, and "the globalists" were accused of orchestrating a population exchange, and were later blamed for exposing children to woke ideology, the promotion of homosexuality, and dangerous sex-change surgeries. In 2021, the anti-LGBTQ law was enacted, a referendum was held next year about "sexual propaganda" in schools, and Pride parades were banned in 2025.

Following the Russian invasion of Ukraine, Fidesz's communication falsely accused the opposition, Brussels, European countries, and NATO members of dragging Hungary into war by seeking to send weapons and soldiers to Ukraine. Painting Ukraine as the source of danger instead of Russia, Fidesz claimed that the opposition conspired with Volodymyr Zelenskyy to interfere with Hungarian elections. The government's rhetoric divided Hungarians into peace-lovers and warmongers, and opposition figures and organizations were labelled "pro-war". The 2024 and 2026 elections were portrayed as a choice between World War III and peace. Numerous Russian-style hostile smear campaigns were launched against Péter Magyar, leader of the Tisza Party and Orbán's main rival. Tisza was planning to increase taxes, and accounts and organizations close to Fidesz released AI-generated videos discrediting him.

== Domestic policy ==
The Orbán government promoted an economic strategy known as Orbanomics, combining selective state intervention, tax cuts, and nationalist rhetoric. The Orbán government tried to negotiate an exemption from the strict European Union regulation setting a 3% limit on budget deficit. Since the request was declined, Hungary turned to taxation policies regarded as unorthodox by the international community to cover the deficit. The key measures include a flat income tax and nationalisation of private pension funds, price controls on utilities and state oversight of key industries, extensive family policy, such as tax exemptions and loans to encourage childbirth and the controversial "slave law" of 2018, allowing up to 400 hours of annual overtime. Supporters credit these policies for low unemployment and relative stability; critics argue they entrench clientelism and reward political loyalty.

=== Approved reforms ===
Compulsory private pension funds were nationalised. This increased the liability of the government by, according to some estimates, about 15% of national output.

A flat 15% income tax was introduced in 2010.

"(The FX mortgage conversion) was one of many negative and controversial decisions from Budapest and many people still find their decision-making controversial. But you have to acknowledge that so far it has worked," said Marcus Svedberg, chief economist at asset manager East Capital.

In 2010, Hungary's birth rate was 1.25 children per woman in 2010 when Orbán first retook office, but by 2019 one year into his third term since his reelection it increased to 1.49 children per woman according to the World Bank. The birth rate peaked in 2021 and started to decline in 2022 again.

Orbán claimed in the 2019 Hungarian State of the Nation speech that his family policies were a replacement for solving the issue of population decline with immigration.

=== Unapproved reforms ===
As part of its economical reforms, Fidesz started to draft the new version of the Tax Law for 2015. Minister of National Economy Mihály Varga announced the proposal on October 21. According to the draft, Internet traffic would be taxed with a 150 Ft/GB rate irrespective of the type of data transmitted. This resulted in 2014 Hungarian Internet tax protests and government dropped the idea of introducing this new tax.

=== Criticism ===
György Molnár, a workfare specialist at the Institute for Economics at the Hungarian Academy of Science, has argued the actual unemployment rate in Hungary was 7.3% instead of 4.2% in 2018, as close to 4% of the workforce participated in Hungary's workfare program, working for only for 1-2 hours a day and earning $175 a month, less than half of the minimum wage in Hungary. The New York Times also pointed to other issues such as increased corruption in Hungary, declining health care quality, and declining student achievement in reading, math and science as issues facing Hungary under Orbanomics. Factors outside of Hungary's control have also been used to explain part of the country's economic revival, such as EU funding constituting 4% of the country's GDP and global economic improvement.

== Foreign policy and EU relations ==
Hungary remained a member of the European Union and NATO, but Orbán pursued a sovereigntist and Eurosceptic foreign policy. His government frequently clashed with the EU over judicial independence, migration, and LGBTQ+ rights. Budapest's relations with Brussels were strained by the suspension of billions in EU funds under the rule-of-law conditionality mechanism. At the same time, Orbán deepened economic ties with China and Russia, including Chinese investment in battery and electric vehicle plants and the Budapest–Belgrade railway. During the Russian invasion of Ukraine, Hungary condemned the attack but opposed energy sanctions and arms transfers, citing national interests.

In December 2022, The European Commission announced it would hold back all 22 billion euros of EU cohesion funds for Hungary until its government meets conditions related to judiciary independence, academic freedoms, LGBTQI rights and the asylum system.

In June 2024, Hungary was fined 200 million euros, in addition to a daily one-million-euro fine by the European Court of Justice for "deliberately evading" compliance with European Union laws on migration and asylum seekers.

In April 2025, Israeli Prime Minister Benjamin Netanyahu visited Budapest, despite the ICC's arrest warrant for Netanyahu for alleged war crimes and crimes against humanity in the Gaza Strip. During the visit, the Hungarian government of Orbán announced that Hungary would withdraw from the International Criminal Court (ICC), describing it as "politically biased".

Despite the anti-EU rhetoric from Orbán, Hungary under Orbán supported enlargement of the European Union with Serbia, Albania, Moldova, Montenegro, North Macedonia, Bosnia and Herzegovina, Georgia and Turkey.

== Leadership ==
=== Prime Ministers ===
No.	Portrait	Name (Birth–Death)	Term of office			Party
No.	Portrait	Name (Birth–Death)	Took office	Left office	Tenure	Party
1		Viktor Orbán (born 1963)	29 May 2010	9 May 2026	15 years, 345 days	Fidesz

=== Presidents ===
No.	Portrait	Name (Birth–Death)	Term of office			Party
No.	Portrait	Name (Birth–Death)	Took office	Left office	Tenure	Party
1		Pál Schmitt (born 1942)	6 August 2010	2 April 2012	1 year, 240 days	Fidesz
—		László Kövér (born 1959) acting	2 April 2012	10 May 2012	38 days	Fidesz
2		János Áder (born 1959)	10 May 2012	10 May 2022	10 years, 0 days	Fidesz
3		Katalin Novák (born 1977)	10 May 2022	26 February 2024	1 year, 292 days	Fidesz
—		László Kövér (born 1959) acting	26 February 2024	5 March 2024	8 days	Fidesz
4		Tamás Sulyok (born 1956)	5 March 2024	20 July 2026	2 years, 240 days	Independent

=== Other senior officials ===
Portrait	Name (Birth–Death)	Position(s)	Party
	Antal Rogán (born 1972)	Minister of the Prime Minister's Cabinet Office (2015–2026); Leader of the Fidesz parliamentary group (2012–2015)	Fidesz
	Gergely Gulyás (born 1981)	Minister of the Prime Minister's Office (2018–2026)	Fidesz
	Zsolt Semjén (born 1962)	Deputy Prime Minister of Hungary (2010–2026); Leader of Christian Democratic People's Party (2003–)	KDNP
	János Lázár (born 1975)	Minister of Construction and Transport (2022–2026); Minister of the Prime Minister's Office (2014–2018); Leader of the Fidesz parliamentary group (2010–2012)	Fidesz
	Tibor Navracsics (born 1966)	Minister for Regional Development and Public Administration (2022–2026); European Commissioner for Education, Culture, Youth and Sport (2014–2019); Deputy Prime Minister of Hungary (2010–2014); Minister of Foreign Affairs (2014); Minister of Public Administration and Justice (2010–2014)	Fidesz → KDNP

=== Cabinets ===
Cabinet	Head (Prime Minister)	Deputy head(s)	Term of office			Party(s)	Parliamentary support
Cabinet	Head (Prime Minister)	Deputy head(s)	Formed	Dissolved	Tenure	Party(s)	Parliamentary support
Government of National Cooperation	Viktor Orbán	Zsolt Semjén; Tibor Navracsics	29 May 2010	6 June 2014	4 years, 8 days	Fidesz; KDNP	Supermajority (except 2015–2018)
Third Orbán Government	Viktor Orbán	Zsolt Semjén	6 June 2014	18 May 2018	3 years, 346 days	Fidesz; KDNP	Supermajority (except 2015–2018)
Fourth Orbán Government	Viktor Orbán	Zsolt Semjén; Mihály Varga; Sándor Pintér	18 May 2018	24 May 2022	4 years, 6 days	Fidesz; KDNP	Supermajority (except 2015–2018)
Fifth Orbán Government	Viktor Orbán	Zsolt Semjén	24 May 2022	9 May 2026	4 years, 160 days	Fidesz; KDNP	Supermajority (except 2015–2018)

== Criticism and assessments ==
Countries autocratizing (red) or democratizing (blue) substantially and significantly (2010–2020). Countries in grey are substantially unchanged. Hungary was during this decade one of the countries with the most democratic backsliding.

International organisations, including Freedom House, Reporters Without Borders, and the European Parliament, have cited Hungary as an example of democratic backsliding and media capture. Supporters argue that Orbán's policies reflected democratic will, upheld Christian values, and restored order after decades of liberal mismanagement.

Critics of the Orbán system argued that Hungary had experienced a systemic decline in democratic standards and institutional integrity since 2010. Independent observers and international watchdogs documented the erosion of judicial independence, as court appointments and administrative oversight increasingly fall under political control, limiting checks on executive authority. The government's capture of media and business sectors also drew concern, with a vast network of pro-government outlets and loyal business elites dominating public discourse and the economy. Furthermore, analysts noted manipulation of electoral rules and campaign resources, including redistricting and the use of state media for partisan advantage, which contributed to the entrenchment of Fidesz's political dominance. Widespread allegations of corruption and nepotism point to the concentration of public contracts and European Union funds among allies of the ruling party, reinforcing what Transparency International and the European Parliament describe as "state capture". In addition, the Orbán government was accused of restricting academic freedom and minority rights, including legislative measures targeting universities, NGOs, and the LGBTQ+ community, which critics viewed as undermining pluralism and human rights protections in Hungary.

== Legacy and influence ==
Orbán's model influenced right-wing populist movements across Europe and the United States, often cited as a prototype of "illiberal democracy". Orbán continuously remained in power for 16 years through four consecutive supermajority victories (2010, 2014, 2018, and 2022) until his defeat in the 2026 Hungarian parliamentary election to Péter Magyar. Despite economic challenges and tensions with the EU, his control over Hungary's institutions and political narrative were strong.

== See also ==
- Media in Hungary
- Orbanism
- Politics of Hungary

== Bibliography ==
- Bozóki, András; Hegedűs, Dániel (2020). "An externally constrained hybrid regime: Hungary in the European Union". Democratization. 27 (6): 1014–1033. doi:10.1080/13510347.2020.1744838.
- Bátory, Ágnes (2016). "Populists in government? Hungary's 'System of National Cooperation'". Democratization. 23 (2): 283–303. doi:10.1080/13510347.2015.1076214.
- Enyedi, Zsolt (2020). "Right-wing authoritarian innovations in Central and Eastern Europe". East European Politics. 36 (3): 363–377. doi:10.1080/21599165.2020.1787162.
- Magyar, Bálint (2016). Post-Communist Mafia State: The Case of Hungary. Budapest: CEU Press.
- Lendvai, Paul (2019). Orbán: Europe's New Strongman. New York: Oxford University Press. ISBN 978-0190075927.
- Grzymała-Busse, Anna (2019). "How Populists Rule: The Consequences for Democratic Governance". Polity. 51 (4): 707–717. doi:10.1086/705573.
- Scheiring, Gábor (2020). The Retreat of Liberal Democracy: Authoritarian Capitalism and the Accumulative State in Hungary. London: Palgrave Macmillan.
- Krekó, Péter; Enyedi, Zsolt (2022). "Orbán's Laboratory of Illiberalism". Journal of Democracy. 33 (3): 45–59. doi:10.1353/jod.2022.0043.
- Sitter, Nick; Bakke, Elisabeth (2019). "Democratic Backsliding in the European Union: The Role of Hungary and Poland". Perspectives on Politics. 17 (2): 309–323. doi:10.1017/S1537592718003371.
