= Judit Takács =

Judit Takács (born 1968) is a Hungarian sociologist, researcher and university professor. She is a Research Chair of the Hungarian Academy of Sciences and works at the Institute of Sociology of the Centre for Social Sciences.

Her main research interests are family roles, work–life balance, social history of sexual minorities, transphobia, homophobia, discrimination, equality, and HIV/AIDS prevention.

== Life and education ==
Takács was born in Budapest, Hungary. Her parents were both intellectuals; her mother was a linguist, her father was an ethnographer. She studied history and Hungarian language and literature (MA degree 1992) and cultural anthropology (MA degree 1995) at Eotvos Lorand University of Budapest. She also got an MA in Social Sciences (1994) from University of Amsterdam.

Takács has a PhD degree in sociology from Corvinus University, she got her habilitation in 2011 from Eotvos Lorand University.

== Publications ==
=== In Hungarian ===
- László, Mocsonaki (2017). "A stigmatizáció hatásai HIV-vel élő meleg férfiakra Magyarországon". Esély Társadalom- és Szociálpolitikai Folyóirat. 29 (1): 45–71.
- Neményi Mária – Takács Judit (2015) Örökbefogadás és diszkrimináció Magyarországon. "Esély 27(2): 32-61" (PDF).
- Takács J - Mocsonaki László - P. Tóth Tamás (2008) "Esély 2008/3" (PDF).
- Takács J (2004) Homoszexualitás és társadalom. "Új Mandátum Kiadó: Budapest" (PDF).

=== In English ===
- Takács J (2017) Listing Homosexuals since the 1920s and under State Socialism in Hungary. 157–170. In Catherine Baker (ed.) "Gender in 20th-Century Eastern Europe and the USSR". Archived from the original on 2017-07-29.
- Szalma Ivett; Takács J (2017) How to measure fathering practices in a European comparison? 228–249. In Michael J. Breen (ed.) "Values and Identities in Europe: Evidence from the European Social Survey".
- Takács J; Szalma Ivett; Bartus Tamás (2016) Social Attitudes toward Adoption by Same-Sex Couples in Europe. Takács, Judit (2016). "Archives of Sexual Behavior 45(7)". Archives of Sexual Behavior. 45 (7): 1787–1798. doi:10.1007/s10508-016-0691-9. PMID 26919840.
- Szalma Ivett – Takács J (2015) Who Remains Childless? Unrealized Fertility Plans in Hungary. "Sociologicky časopis/Czech Sociological Review, 51(6)" (PDF). Archived from the original (PDF) on 2017-07-29.
- Takács (2015). "Effects of a social network HIV/STD prevention intervention for MSM in Russia and Hungary: a randomized controlled trial". AIDS. 29 (5): 583–93. doi:10.1097/QAD.0000000000000558. PMC 4497559. PMID 25565495.
- Takács J (2015) Disciplining gender and (homo)sexuality in state socialist Hungary in the 1970s. In: Takács, Judit (2015). "European Review of History: Revue européenne d'histoire 22(1)" (PDF). European Review of History: Revue Européenne d'Histoire. 22: 161–175. doi:10.1080/13507486.2014.983426.
- Takács (2013). "Effects of Stigmatization on Gay Men Living with HIV/AIDS in a Central-Eastern European Context: A Qualitative Analysis from Hungary". Sexuality Research and Social Policy. 10 (1): 24–34. doi:10.1007/s13178-012-0102-5. PMC 3579507. PMID 23439743.
- Takács; Ivett, Szalma (2011). "Homophobia and same-sex partnership legislation in Europe". Equality, Diversity and Inclusion. 30 (5): 356–378. doi:10.1108/02610151111150627.
- Hobson; Takács, J (2011). "Agency and Capabilities to Achieve a Work-Life Balance: A Comparison of Sweden and Hungary". Social Politics. 18 (2): 168–198. doi:10.1093/sp/jxr007.
