= National Media and Infocommunications Authority =

Hungarian regulatory agency

- Nemzeti Média- és Hírközlési Hatóság (NMHH)

Agency overview
- Formed: December 20, 2010; 15 years ago
- Jurisdiction: Government of Hungary
- Headquarters: Budapest
- Agency executives: Gábor Polyák, President; Márta Bencsik, Member; Bea Judit Bodrogi, Member; Krisztina Nagy, Member; András Radetzky, Member; István Boór-Gőblyös, Member
- Website: nmhh.hu

The National Media and Infocommunications Authority (Hungarian: Nemzeti Média- és Hírközlési Hatóság, NMHH) is an independent commission tasked with oversight of media and communication. This includes surveillance and regulation of broadcast stations, television, newspapers, and media service providers. Additionally, it can issue and manage a broadcast license for any radio systems. It was established in 2010 by the second Orbán government. The authority is run by a five member media council, with one president and four members. This council is elected by the National Assembly with a two-thirds majority. The council serves out a nine year term.

== Background ==
After the 2010 elections, Fidesz used its two-thirds supermajority to restructure media law, described as "the de-consolidation of media freedom" and "the most politically captured [media regulatory system] in the EU". Through the Act CLXXXV of 2010 (Media Act), (Note: Unlike the 1996 Radio and Television Act, the 2010 Media Act was not preceded by any consultation with professional and civil organizations, and opposition parties voted against it.) the National Radio and Television Council (ORTT) – which managed frequency allocation and the redistribution of license fee revenues – was replaced by the NMHH with jurisdiction over all media, governed by the Media Council.

== Core functions ==
The main activities of the Authority are to continually monitor the state of electronic communications and postal services. Action is taken if any rules or obligations are breached. There are a several main acts that define the core functions. For Electronic Communication, the Authority manages radio frequencies, conducts spectrum management, and handles official matters related to electronic communication services. For Media, the Authority maintains official registers, determines provision fees, and supervises compliance for media controlled by provisions. For Digital Switchover, the Authority manages monitoring of media distribution services and ensures competition compliance. The Authority also performs tasks related to the Postal Service, registers and verifies electronic signatures, and supervises unsolicited electronic advertising. In enforcement of these functions, the Authority has the ability to impose fines as well as suspension of service and termination of contracts.

== Media Council ==
Under Orbán, the Media Council included only ruling-party members, which has been compared to Russia's Roskomnadzor. Their terms of office were nine years, which could be renewed. Nominated by the Prime Minister, the Chair of the council also headed the NMHH.

Following the 2026 change of government, the Parliament ended the mandates of the council's members. The new media law (Act XXI of 2026) introduced a new appointment system:

- three members are nominated by the government for four-year terms,
- three members are nominated by the opposition for four-year terms, and
- the chair is chosen through an open professional competition for a five-year term.

The act established the Press Fund (Sajtóalap) to support media outlets operating in line with ethical standards, administered by the council.

== Criticism ==
The Authority has faced criticism from both inside and outside of Hungary since its inception. Under the Orbán regime, the authority was criticized for its lack of transparency and independence from Fidesz, as well as for benefiting pro-government outlets, while discriminating against government critical media.

The NMHH allocated frequencies according to its own criteria, and it imposed heavy fines for coverage it considered to have broken vaguely written regulations. In 2010, the NMHH refused to renew the frequencies of the long-standing left-liberal Klubrádió, citing arbitrary reasons. In 2012, after Viktor Orbán spoke at the European Parliament, he faced criticism for defending the Authority while facing pressures to roll back such measures. In 2022, the renewal of frequency license for Tilos Rádió was blocked by the NMHH due to rules infractions that critics deemed were minor. This includes four instances of inappropriate language in a seven year period and errors in annual reports. The radio was able to broadcast again later that year after purchasing the frequency license. Supporters of the authority responded to criticism by citing the councils appointment by a democratic body and maintain that it is in line with similar semi-independent bodies in Europe.

== See also ==
- Second premiership of Viktor Orbán
- Mass media in Hungary
