= Władek =

Władek is a diminutive of the male given name Władysław. Notable people known under the name include:

- Wladek Minor (born 1946), Polish-American structural biologist
- Władek Zbyszko (1892–1968), Polish catch wrestler, professional wrestler and strongman

== See also ==
- Ladislao, Ladislas, Ladislaus, Ladislav, László, Vladislav/Vladislava/Vladek, Vladyslav/Volodyslav, Władysław/Władek
