= Jagiełło (disambiguation) =

Jagiełło or Jagiello may refer to:

== People ==
- Władysław II Jagiełło (c. 1348–1434), also known as Ladislaus II, Vladislaus II, or Jogaila, king of Poland and grand duke of Lithuania
- The Jagiellon dynasty or any of its members
- Aleksander Jagiełło, Polish footballer
- Eugeniusz Jagiełło (1873–1947), Polish politician
- Filip Jagiełło (b. 1997), Polish footballer
- Jarosław Jagiełło (born 1971), Polish politician
- Ladislaus Jagiello (disambiguation)
- Michał Jagiełło (1941–2016), writer, poet and mountaineer
- Michał Jagiełło (born 1990), swimmer
- Walter Jagiello (1930–2006), American polka musician

== Other ==
- Jagiełło Oak (c. 1524–1974), an oak tree in the Białowieża Forest
- Jagiello, a junior synonym of the butterfly genus Timaeta
- SS Jagiełło, a passenger ship in service 1947-49
