= Vladek =

Vladek is a diminutive of the male given name Vladislav.

- Vladek Lacina (1949–2026), Czech rower
- Vladek Sheybal (1923–1992), Polish actor

== Fictional characters ==
- Lord Vladek the Evil
- Vladek Spiegelman

== See also ==
- Ladislao, Ladislas, Ladislaus, Ladislav, László, Vladislav/Vladislava/Vladek, Vladyslav/Volodyslav, Władysław/Władek
- Baruch Charney Vladeck
