= Čelakovský =

Čelakovský (feminine: Čelakovská) is a Czech surname, derived from the town of Čelákovice. Notable people with the surname include:

- František Ladislav Čelakovský (1799–1852), Czech writer and translator
- Ladislav Josef Čelakovský (1834–1902), Czech botanist
- Ladislav František Čelakovský (1863–1916), Czech botanist
