= Vladislav (disambiguation) =

Vladislav is a male given name of Slavic origin.

Vladislav may also refer to:

== Places ==
- Vladislav (Třebíč District), a market town in the Czech Republic

== See also ==
- Vladislavci, a municipality in Osijek-Baranja county, Croatia
- Władysławowo, a town in Poland
- What Is Love, a hit song by singer Haddaway, often misheard as "Vladislav"
- Ladislaus
