= Ladislav =

Ladislav is a Czech, Slovak and Croatian variant of the Slavic name Vladislav. The female form of this name is Ladislava.

== Athletes ==
- Ladislav Beneš, Czechoslovak Olympic handball player
- Ladislav Benýšek, Czech ice hockey player
- Ladislav Čepčianský, Czechoslovak sprint canoer
- Ladislav Dluhoš, Czechoslovak ski jumper
- Ladislav Fouček
- Ladislav Hecht (1909–2004), Czechoslovak/American tennis player
- Ladislav Hrubý, cross-country skier
- Ladislav Jurkemik, Czechoslovak/Slovak footballer and manager
- Ladislav Kačáni, Czechoslovak footballer and coach
- Ladislav Kohn, Czech ice hockey player
- Ladislav Kuna, Czechoslovak footballer
- Ladislav Lubina, Czechoslovak ice hockey player and coach
- Ladislav Maier, Czech footballer
- Ladislav Nagy, Slovak ice hockey player
- Ladislav Novák, Czechoslovak footballer
- Ladislav Pataki, Czechoslovak/American coach and sports scientist
- Ladislav Pavlovič, Czechoslovak footballer
- Ladislav Petráš, Czechoslovak footballer
- Ladislav Prášil, Czech shot putter
- Ladislav Rybánsky, Slovak footballer
- Ladislav Rygl, Jr., Czech Nordic combined Olympic skier
- Ladislav Rygl, Sr., Czechoslovak Nordic combined Olympic skier
- Ladislav Ščurko, Slovak ice hockey player and confessed murderer
- Ladislav Šimůnek, Czechoslovak footballer
- Ladislav Škorpil, Czech football manager
- Ladislav Šmíd, Czech ice hockey player
- Ladislav Švanda, Czech Olympic cross country skier
- Ladislav Troják, Czechoslovak ice hockey player
- Ladislav Trpkoš, Czechoslovak Olympic basketball player
- Ladislav Vácha, Czechoslovak Olympic gymnast
- Ladislav Vízek, Czechoslovak footballer
- Ladislav Volešák, Czech footballer

== Politicians ==
- Ladislav Adamec (1926–2007), Czechoslovak Prime Minister, Communist politician
- Ladislav Miko (born 1961), Czech politician and expert on environmental issues
- Ladislav Pejačević (1824–1901), Croatian politician, Ban of Croatia
- Ladislav Polka (1952–2025), Slovak politician

== Scientists ==
- Ladislav Brožek, Slovak astronomer
- Ladislav František Čelakovský, Czech mycologist and botanist
- Ladislav Josef Čelakovský, Czech botanist
- Ladislav Mucina, Slovak botanist, ecologist, and vegetation expert

== Writers and artists ==
- Ladislav Bublík (1924–1988), Czech writer
- Ladislav Fialka, Czechoslovak mime
- Ladislav Fuks, Czechoslovak novelist
- Ladislav "Ladi" Geisler, Czechoslovak musician
- Ladislav Hejdánek (1927–2020), Czech philosopher and professor
- Ladislav Klíma, Czech philosopher and novelist
- Ladislav Kralj, Croatian painter and engraver
- Ladislav Kubík, Czechoslovak/American composer
- Ladislav Kupkovič, Czechoslovak composer and conductor
- Ladislav Mňačko, Czechoslovak writer and journalist
- Ladislav Mráz, Czechoslovak opera singer
- Ladislav Nádaši-Jégé, Slovak writer, literary critic, and doctor
- Ladislav Šaloun, Czechoslovak sculptor
- Ladislav Slovák, Czechoslovak conductor
- Ladislav Smoček, Czech playwright and theater director
- Ladislav Smoljak, Czechoslovak film and theater director
- Ladislav Stroupežnický, Austro-Hungarian/Czech author, playwright, and director
- Ladislav Vycpálek, Czechoslovak composer and violinist
- Ladislav (Laco) Zrubec, Slovak author and writer

== Others ==
- Ladislav Hudec, Austro-Hungarian/Slovak architect
- Ladislav Kovács, Slovak Professional Counter-Strike: Global Offensive player
- Ladislav Prokeš, Czechoslovak chess master and composer of endgame studies
- Ladislav Žák, Czechoslovak architect and painter
- Ladislav Zgusta, Czechoslovak linguist, historian and theorist of lexicography

== See also ==
- Ladislao, Ladislas, Ladislaus, Ladislav, László, Vladislav/Vladislava/Vladek, Vladyslav/Volodyslav, Władysław/Władek
