= Wladislaus II of Poland =

Wladislaus II of Poland may refer to:

- Władysław II the Exile (1105–1159), High Duke of Poland
- Jogaila (1351?-1434), King of Poland. Also known as Władysław II Jagiełło

== See also ==
- Ladislaus Jagiello (disambiguation)
- Ladislaus II (disambiguation)
- Ladislaus (disambiguation)
