= Władysław III of Poland (disambiguation) =

Władysław III of Poland may refer to:

- Władysław III of Poland (1424-1444), also known as Władysław III of Varna, King of Poland
- Władysław III Spindleshanks (1165?-1231), High Duke of Poland

== See also ==
- Ladislaus (disambiguation)
- Ladislaus III (disambiguation)
- Władysław (disambiguation)
