= Ladislaus I of Poland =

Ladislaus I of Poland (also Wladislaus I of Poland) may refer to:

- Władysław I Herman (c. 1040–1102), Duke of Poland
- Władysław I the Elbow-high (1261–1333), King of Poland (also known as Ladislaus the Short, or Władysław I Łokietek)

== See also ==
- Ladislaus I (disambiguation)
- Ladislaus (disambiguation)
