= László =

László (Hungarian pronunciation: [ˈlaːsloː]) is a Hungarian male given name and surname after the King-Knight Saint Ladislaus I of Hungary (1077–1095). It derives from Ladislav, a variant of Vladislav. It is the most common male name among the whole Hungarian male population since 2003. Notable people with the name include:

== Given name ==
=== Science and mathematics ===
- László Babai (b. 1950), Hungarian-born American mathematician and computer scientist
- László Lovász (b. 1948), Hungarian mathematician
- László Fejes Tóth (1915–2005), Hungarian mathematician
- László Fuchs (b. 1924), Hungarian-American mathematician
- László Rátz (1863–1930), influential Hungarian mathematics high school teacher
- László Tisza (1907–2009), Professor of Physics Emeritus at the Massachusetts Institute of Technology
- László Mérő (b. 1949), Hungarian research psychologist and science author

=== Politics and the military ===
- László Almásy (politician) (1869–1936), Hungarian jurist, soldier and politician
- László Batthyány-Strattmann (1870–1931), Hungarian aristocrat and physician
- László Ignác Bercsényi (1689–1778), Hungarian-born soldier who became Marshal of France
- László Csány, Hungarian politician, martyr of the Hungarian Revolution of 1848
- László Kövér (b. 1959), Hungarian politician
- László Rajk (1909–1949), Hungarian communist and politician
- László L. Simon (born 1972), Hungarian politician and writer
- László Palóczy (1783–1861), Hungarian politician
- László Sólyom (1942–2023), Hungarian politician, lawyer and librarian; President of Hungary from 2005 to 2010
- László Szalkai (1485–1526), Archbishop of Esztergom and official under King Louis II of Hungary
- László Szapáry (1831–1883), Hungarian general
- László Szőgyény-Marich, Sr. (1806–1893), Hungarian politician
- László Szőgyény-Marich, Jr. (1841–1916), Austro-Hungarian diplomat; son of László Szőgyény-Marich, Sr.
- László Teleki (1811–1861), Hungarian politician and writer
- László Tőkés (b. 1952), Romanian Vice President of the European Parliament

=== Music ===
- László Lajtha (1892–1963), composer
- László Simon (1948–2009), Hungarian pianist
- Laszlo Gardony (b. 1956) Hungarian-American pianist, composer
- László Benkő (1943-2020) Hungarian keyboardist for the band Omega

=== Film ===
- Leslie Howard (actor) (1893–1943), British-Hungarian actor born László Steiner
- László Hetey (1942–2025), Hungarian actor and puppeteer
- László Kalmár (director) (1900–1980), a Hungarian film director
- László Kovács (cinematographer) (1933–2007), Hungarian-American cinematographer
- Peter Lorre (1904–1964), Hungarian-born Hollywood actor born László Löwenstein
- László Nemes (1977), Hungarian film director
- László Szirtes (1904–1959), Hungarian film producer
- László Willinger (1909-1989), Hungarian/Austrian portrait photographer at M.G.M. film studio

=== Sports ===
- Laszlo Bellak (1911–2006), Hungarian/American table tennis player
- László Bölöni (b. 1953), Romanian-born Hungarian former footballer and coach
- László Cseh (b. 1985), Hungarian swimmer
- László Fazekas (1947–2026), Hungarian football player and manager
- László Kubala (1927–2002), Hungarian footballer
- László Kuncz (1957–2020), Hungarian water polo player
- László Papp (1926–2003), Hungarian boxer
- László Szabados (1911–1992), Hungarian swimmer
- László Szollás (1907–1980), Hungarian world champion pairs skater
- Laslo Djere (b. 1995), Serbian professional tennis player

=== Other ===
- László Almásy (1895–1951), Hungarian aristocrat, motorist, aviator, and explorer
- László Bárczay (1936–2016), Hungarian chess Grandmaster
- Laszlo Berkowits (1928–2020), Hungarian-born American Reform rabbi
- László Bíró (1899–1985), Hungarian-Argentine inventor of the ballpoint pen
- László Hudec (1893–1958), Hungarian-Slovak architect
- László Krasznahorkai (b. 1954), Hungarian novelist and screenwriter
- László Listi (1628–1662), Hungarian poet
- László Moholy-Nagy (1895–1946), Hungarian painter
- László Péter (1929–2008), Hungarian-born British historian
- László Szabó (chess player) (1917–1998), Hungarian Grandmaster
- Laszlo Toth (born 1938), Hungarian-Australian geologist and art vandal
- Les Murray (1945-2017), born László Ürge, Hungarian-Australian football broadcaster

=== Fictional characters ===
- Lazlo, protagonist of Camp Lazlo
- Lazlo, the protagonist in the Japanese novelization of Suikoden IV
- Laszlo, a human-pig hybrid in the two-part Doctor Who story that begins with "Daleks in Manhattan"
- Laszlo (The Butcher), the final boss of the Fortress Campaign in the video game Heroes of Might and Magic V: Hammers of Fate
- Laszlo Carreidas, a character in the Tintin comic Flight 714 to Sydney
- Lazlo Hollyfeld, in the 1985 film Real Genius
- Lazlo Gogolak, the villain in the 2004 comedy film The Whole Ten Yards
- László Tóth, the protagonist of The Brutalist
- Laszlo W. Kovic, a CIA agent in the video game Battlefield 4
- Lazlo Zand, in the Robotech universe
- Lazlo Curious, a character who lives in the Strangetown neighborhood in The Sims 2
- Lazlo, a character in Salvation (TV series)
- Lazlo Valentin, the alter ego of DC Comics supervillain Professor Pyg
- Dr. Laszlo Kreizler, titular character of the novel The Alienist and its TV adaptation
- Lazlo Strange, the protagonist in Laini Taylor's book Strange the Dreamer
- Laszlo Cravensworth, a vampire from the sitcom What We Do in the Shadows
- Laszlo, a character in the video game Half-Life 2
- Dr. Laszlo Jamf, a character in the novel Gravity's Rainbow

== Surname ==
=== Science and mathematics ===
- Alexander Laszlo (1964), American systems scientist
- Ernő László (1897–1973), Hungarian-born American dermatologist and cosmetic businessman
- Ervin László (b. 1932), Hungarian philosopher of science, systems theorist, and integral theorist
- Yves Laszlo, French mathematician working in the École Polytechnique

=== Music ===
- Alexander László (1895–1970), Hungarian-American pianist, musical composer, arranger and inventor
- Ferenc László (1937–2010), Romanian musicologist and flautist
- Ken Laszlo, Italian pop singer
- Viktor Lazlo (born 1960), stage name of Belgian singer Sonia Dronier
- Willem Laszlo (born 1998), Dutch electronic music producer

=== Film ===
- Andrew Laszlo (1926–2011) Hungarian-American cinematographer
- Ernest Laszlo (1898–1984), Hungarian-American cinematographer
- Hana Laszlo (b. 1953) Israeli actress and comedian

=== Sports ===
- Csaba László (footballer born 1964), Hungarian football player and manager
- Csaba László (footballer born 1967), Hungarian football player
- László Szollás (1907–1980), world champion and Olympic medalist pair skater

=== Other ===
- Miklós László (1903–1973), Hungarian-American playwright
- Paul László, (1900–1993), architect
- Philip de László (1869–1937), Hungarian painter
- Lucy de László (1870–1950), Irish wife of Philip de László
- Tony László (b. 1960), journalist

=== Fictional characters ===
- Carl Lazlo, Esq., an idealistic lawyer in the 1980 movie Where the Buffalo Roam
- Victor Laszlo, in the 1942 film Casablanca (film), played by Paul Henreid

== See also ==
- Albert-László Barabási, Hungarian-Romanian scientist

== See also ==
- Laszlo Toth, a pen name for comedian and humorist Don Novello
- Ladislao, Ladislas, Ladislaus, Ladislav, László, Vladislav/Vladislava/Vladek, Vladyslav/Volodyslav, Władysław/Władek
