= Wladyslaw I of Poland =

Vladislaus I of Poland may refer to:

- Władysław I Herman (ca. 1044 - 1102), Duke of Poland
- Władysław I the Elbow-high (1261 – 1333), King of Poland

== See also ==
- Ladislaus I (disambiguation)
