= Vladislaus II of Bohemia =

Vladislaus II, Vladislav II, Wladislaw II or Ladislaus II of Bohemia may refer to:

- Vladislaus II, Duke and King of Bohemia (1110–1174)
- Vladislaus II of Hungary (1456–1516)

== See also ==
- Ladislaus II (disambiguation)
