= Ladislaus V of Hungary =

Ladislaus V of Hungary may refer to:

- Ladislaus the Posthumous (1440-1457), also known as Ladislaus of Bohemia and Hungary, King of Bohemia, Hungary, and Croatia; and Duke of Austria
- Wenceslaus III of Bohemia (1289-1306), King of Hungary, Bohemia, and Poland, who took the name Ladislaus V

== See also ==
- Ladislaus (disambiguation)
