= Ladislaus Jagiello =

Ladislaus Jagiello (alternately spelled Władysław Jagiełło, Vladislav Jagellonský, or similar) may refer to:

- Jogaila (c. 1362-1434), Grand Duke of Lithuania and founder of the dynasty, later King of Poland as Władysław II Jagiełło
- Władysław III of Poland (1424–1444), son of Władysław II Jagiełło of Poland
- Vladislaus II of Hungary (1456–1516), grandson of Władysław II Jagiełło and son of Casimir IV Jagiellon

== See also ==
- Jagiellon dynasty, royal dynasty originating from the Lithuanian House of Gediminas dynasty that reigned in Central European countries 14th-16th centuries
- Ladislaus (disambiguation) (For others (not Jagello) named Ladislas or Vladislas)
- Wladislaus II of Poland (disambiguation)
- Ladislaus II (disambiguation)
- Ladislaus III (disambiguation)
