= Károly Gerendai =

Hungarian businessperson (born 1970)

- Born: July 18, 1970 (age 56); Budapest

Károly Gerendai (born July 18, 1970, Budapest) is a Hungarian entrepreneur, cultural manager and festival organizer, best known as the founder of the Sziget Festival He launched Sziget in 1993, which has since grown into one of Europe's largest music festivals. He is also a significant player in the gastronomy field, as the owner of several Michelin-starred restaurants, including Costes. He is the founder, spiritual father and leader of the I Love Hungary club. Gerendai is committed to culture and gastronomy, and his work has had a significant impact on Hungary's tourism. He has received numerous recognitions for his achievements in culture and business.

== Career ==
Born in Budapest in 1970, he spent his childhood in Gödöllő. After his parents divorced, he moved to Budapest with his father, who worked as an engineer, at the age of 10. He grew up in an intellectual family with noble ancestors. Breaking away from the upper-middle-class milieu, he moved out and started an independent life at the age of 17. He graduated from the Kaffka Margit High School (now Szent Margit High School) in 1988, but started working alongside school after moving out from his parents. Although he never earned a degree, he is considered one of the most recognized experts in culture, tourism, and gastronomy. He is a regular lecturer at several higher education institutions. He is one of the most recognized cultural organizers and entrepreneurs in Hungary, who has proven his aptitude and excellent business sense in many areas.

He began his career as a poster paster and tour manager, then managed various Hungarian bands (Lord (1990–1991) and Sziámi (1991–1994). In parallel, he worked at record labels (Magneoton, Extraton), initially as an organizer and distributor, later in leadership positions. In 1993, at the age of 22, he created the Sziget Festival with his acquaintances and friends, which has now become one of Europe's largest music events. Since then, he has launched numerous other successful projects, and his businesses have become market leaders in several areas.

Károly Gerendai's maximalism, work ethic, calmness, openness, approachability, and innovative thinking have elevated him to an outstanding businessman, although his emotional approach often dominates in his activities.

His work can be divided into three main areas, businesses arising from interests, business investments and social engagement. He is a world traveler who has visited nearly 100 countries, often drawing inspiration from these experiences. In many cases, his businesses also have significant social benefits, as creating value and supporting talents/good initiatives are particularly important to him.

== Businesses ==
=== Businesses arising from interests ===
His main areas of interest are culture, tourism and gastronomy, so his businesses primarily operate in these areas.

At the age of 22, in 1993, he founded Sziget Cultural Management Ltd. (currently Sziget Cultural Management Inc.) with Péter Müller Sziámi. The company has become the region's largest and most well-known event organizing business by realizing numerous domestic and international festivals. Under his leadership, the Sziget Festival grew into Central Europe's largest multicultural festival, becoming a Top 10 category event worldwide. Gerendai's main activity between 1993 and 2017 was event organization, as he was not only the founder and co-owner of Sziget Ltd., but also its managing director.

The Sziget company's projects:

- 1993 - Sziget Festival (Budapest, Óbudai Island)
- 1996 - 2001 Wanted Festival (Mezőtúr)
- 1999 - 2009 Day of Passions
- 1999 - 2005 Sport Sziget
- 2000 - 2006 Budapest Parade
- 2002 - 2011 Peninsula Festival (Romania, Transylvania, Târgu Mureș)
- 2002 - 2022 VOLT Festival (Sopron)
- 2002 - Children's Sziget (Budapest, Óbudai Island)
- 2007 - Balaton Sound (Zamárdi)
- 2008 - 2012 Hungarian Song Day
- 2010 - 2011 StarGarden Festival (Budapest)
- 2011 - Gourmet Festival (Budapest)
- 2013 - Strand (Zamárdi)
- 2013 - 2020 Be My Lake
- 2013 - Rock'n Coke (Turkey, Istanbul)
- 2013 - 2014 Fridge Festival (Austria, Vienna, Kaprun)
- 2024 – VIBE Budapest (Budapest, Széchenyi Square)

The Sziget Festival was first held in 1993, then under the name Student Island. In addition to winning the best major festival award several times in European competitions, it has now become one of the world's most significant multicultural events. With hundreds of thousands of foreign visitors, it is now one of Hungary's most important tourist attractions. Over the years, the ownership structure of the Sziget company changed several times, but he represented the constant element for nearly 30 years (until the end of 2022). His business partners included Balázs Szekfű (1993-1994), Péter Müller Sziámi (1993-2008), Gábor Takács (1998-2022), Ferenc Kedves (2008), Econet Nyrt. (2009-2013), Norbert Lobenwein (2009-2022), Zoltán Fülöp (2009-2022). Under Gerendai's leadership, Sziget Inc. became a 51% owner of MEEX, the company organizing Snowattack and Beachattack events. Also during his management, Sziget Inc. became a co-owner of FestiPay Inc., which primarily deals with cashless solutions and payment methods for events, now operating in numerous countries.

In 2017, after 25 years of active organizing work, he handed over the company's management to his chosen successor, Tamás Kádár, and retired from festival organization. In the same year, he sold 70% of the company to a subsidiary (Superstruct Entertainment) of an American investment fund (Providence Equity Fund) specializing in festivals. In 2020 and 2021, the festivals were cancelled due to the Covid-19 pandemic, causing the owners more than 1.5 billion forints in losses. As a result, in 2022, he sold the remaining 30% of the company to the previous buyers.

From the 2000s, alongside his cultural organizing activities, his professional and entrepreneurial interest increasingly turned towards gastronomy. The first attempts were aimed at a wider audience, but he became increasingly fascinated by the world of fine dining and Michelin-starred restaurants, so he set out to establish world-class restaurant hospitality in Hungary. With an uncompromising, maximalist approach, they managed to win Hungary's first Michelin star in 2009 with Costes Restaurant on Ráday Street, which sparked a small gastronomic revolution in the country. In this spirit, Gerendai then opened a series of hospitality businesses: Sziget Café, Buena Vista Restaurant, Costes Restaurant, Costes Downtown, Costes Beach Club, Rumour, Nudli, Costes Izakaya, Digó Pizza, Kismező, LupaEvent Hall, Costes Szigliget pop-up restaurant, Costes Catering, Lizsé Bistro, MÁK restaurant. In 2024, the Costes Group's new projects include the revival of Kádár Étkezde (purchasing the brand and property of the Budapest eatery that closed during Covid, with a planned opening in 2025), and the opening of Costes Ypsilon in the luxury marina of Alsóörs. With these ventures, by 2025 the Costes Group operates 15-20 restaurants with 180 employees, and its annual turnover exceeds 2 billion forints

In line with his cultural and tourism interests, he began developing and operating entertainment venues, cultural institutions and tourist attractions (Kultiplex; Budapest Park; Akvárium Klub; Dunaj Klub, Bratislava; Ferris Wheel, WAMP; Lupa Beach), but he also published pop culture (Wanted, Wan2) and program guide (Time Out, Pesti Est) magazines, and was a producer of a TV production (TV Sziget).

=== Investment businesses ===
From the proceeds of the Sziget company sale, he made further investments. For this, he established GK Invest asset management company, which manages his investments. These investments are now businesses whose activities are not necessarily within his core interests, but in the selection criteria, he still considers personal good relationships more important than achievable profit, so the common denominator of these companies was that he joined as an investor partner in companies operated by his former good acquaintances. Such as Dorsum Information Technology Development and Service Inc. (an IT development and service company present in 8 countries), and Octogon Ventures Ltd. (a company dealing with venture capital investment, Hungarian and regional startups).

In 2022, after giving a lecture at an event on sustainability, he met the founding owner of Bibo Franchise Ltd. (a company developing, manufacturing and distributing environmentally conscious products) (András Juhász), whose innovative ideas about greening the hospitality industry impressed him so much that eventually not only did his interests start cooperating with them, but he also joined the venture. Here, however, he not only acts as an investor but also helps the company's development with his connections and experience. Since then, the company has undergone significant market growth and in 2024 they also established a Spanish subsidiary

The Covid-19 pandemic posed significant challenges to Gerendai's businesses, causing more than 1.5 billion forints in losses. Despite this, GK Invest Ltd. achieved a profit after tax of 186 million in 2020.

=== Social purpose businesses ===
Gerendai közéleti és társadalmi felelősségvállalás mentén részt vállal kulturális és szociális szervezetek alapításában, működtetésében, továbbá mentori, oktatói és tanácsadói tevékenységeket folytat (Music Hungary, Szeretem Magyarországot, MédiaUnió, Broadway Egyesület, Pannon Gasztronómiai Akadémia, Magyar Gasztronómiai Egyesület, Bocuse D’or Akadémia, Alkoss Szabadon Alapítvány, Borászok Borásza Alapítvány, Szemlélek Magazin, MOME Konzisztórium, Rajk Kollégium, Forbes Business Klub). His mentoring activities include:

- 2012 - mentor in the Banker Training Institute's mentor program;
- 2019 - mentor for the JÉG (Future Builders Generation) organization;
- 2022 - participated in the mentor program of the National Association of Managers;
- 2025 - continues to be an active mentor in the Banker Training Mentor Program.

He is an active and regular supporter of the Bátor Tábor, Autistic Art, Mosoly, and Városmajor 48 Literary Society foundations. Many pieces from his contemporary art collection decorate the walls of his restaurants and businesses, making them accessible to the general public. Several exhibitions have been held featuring selections from the Gerendai collection (Godot Gallery, Esernyős Gallery), and he regularly lends artworks to museums and galleries. He also supports sports-related artistic initiatives, such as being a jury member for the Create Freely art competition.

== Personal life ==
He is married and the father of 3 children. His hobbies include traveling, gastronomy, collecting contemporary art pieces, and collecting Dupont lighters. Gerendai is a passionate world traveler who has visited nearly 100 countries. Travel is so important to him that he stated: "I would like to see the world for half of the year".

Creating a balance between work and private life is particularly important for Gerendai, although this presents a constant challenge for him. At the age of 16, he decided to earn his own living, and since then he has tried to engage in activities that interest him and that he sees meaning in.

== Professional career ==
- 1985–1988 Establishes and leads the Music and Radio Self-Activity Circle at Kaffka Margit High School in Budapest
- 1986–1987 Launches and operates Youth Rock Club at Gödöllő Cultural Center
- 1987–1989 Works as a poster paster at Downtown and Józsefváros Cultural Centers while in high school, also takes occasional jobs as ticket collector and roadie at concerts and events
- 1988–1991 Works as poster paster and tour manager at Krokodil Ltd.
- 1989–1990 Concert organizer for the Lord band
- 1990–1991 Organizer and record distributor at Magneoton Publishing
- 1991–1993 Head of Extraton Record Label
- 1991–1994 Manager and concert organizer for Sziámi band
- 1993 Co-founds Sziget Ltd. and launches the event initially called Student Island, later Pepsi Sziget, and since 2001 known as Sziget Festival
- 1993 Sziget Group Cultural Association is formed, with him as president
- 1994–1995 Founder and CEO of Central Station, a national youth club network
- 1995–2009 Founder and publisher of Wanted magazine, later WAN2 magazine
- 1997 Hungarian coordinator of the ICBL campaign (International Campaign to Ban Landmines)
- 1999 - 2022 CEO of Youth Event Organizing Public Benefit Company
- 1999 - Founder and vice president of MAKSZ (Hungarian Concert Organizers Association)
- 1999 - 2002 Founder and vice president of Yourope, the European Festival Association
- 1999 - 2005 Founder and president until 2005 of Pesti Broadway Association, created for the development of Liszt Ferenc Square and its surroundings
- 1999 - 2009 Part-owner of Jókai 1. Real Estate Investment Ltd.
- 1999 - 2003 Co-owner of Sziget Café, operating seasonally on Óbuda Island
- 2000 - 2007 Co-founder of Sziget.hu Information Technology Inc.
- 2000 - 2008 Opens Kultiplex Cultural Center with partners, which was a precursor to Budapest ruin pubs and housed Tilos Radio until its closure in 2008
- 2001 - 2006 Opens Buena Vista Restaurant and Café on Liszt Ferenc Square, as CEO and co-owner until its sale in 2006
- 2004 - 2005 Producer of TV Sziget television production company
- 2005 - 2009 Initiator and coordinator of PANKKK (Program for Contemporary Popular Music Culture), which prepared and supervised the government program supporting popular music based on their ideas
- 2005 - Founder, executive, and board member of the I Love Hungary Foundation, which operates a closed club called I Love Hungary Club for successful public figures (but not actively political)
- 2007 - 2010 Part-owner of EMG Ltd., which also publishes Pesti Est
- 2008 - 2010 Board member of econet.hu Plc.
- 2008 - 2009 Part-owner of the company publishing Time Out Budapest
- 2008 - Founder (with Péter Geszti) and board member of Mediaunion, the largest Hungarian media collaboration
- 2008 - Opens Costes Restaurant on Ráday Street with partners, aiming to establish world-class top gastronomy in Hungary
- 2008 - Initiates the Hungarian Song Day event series with Gábor Presser
- 2008 - Joins the Hungarian Gastronomic Association
- 2011-2013 Main organizer of Pannon Wine Review, the most prestigious domestic wine competition
- 2012 - Acquires majority ownership, then in 2014 takes 100% ownership of Vásárnap Ltd., which organizes WAMP (Sunday Artist Market), the most significant Hungarian design fairs
- 2012 - With Sziget partners, purchases 51% of Meex event organizing company and its subsidiary, Festival Travel
- 2012 - 2023 Opens and operates Dunaj club, a cultural center and entertainment venue in Bratislava, Slovakia, which is relocated to a new location in 2023
- 2012 - Becomes co-owner of Budapest Park, the largest outdoor entertainment venue in the capital
- 2012 - Mentor in the Banker Training Institute's mentor program
- 2012 - Establishes the Music Hungary professional conference in Eger
- 2013 - Initiates the installation of the Ferris wheel in Elizabeth Square in downtown Budapest, which has since attracted over 500,000 visitors annually
- 2014 - Initiator of the Cseh Tamás Program, later renamed Hangfoglaló Program, a government program for popular music
- 2014 - Launches WAMP design fairs in Vienna and Bratislava
- 2014 - Co-founder of "Nagyszínpad", a televised band competition for showcasing talent
- 2015 - 2020 Elected as a member of the MOME Consistory
- 2015 - Opens Costes Downtown restaurant with partners in the downtown Prestige hotel
- 2016 - Conceives and begins implementation of the Lupa Beach project, initially operating "Budapest's Seashore", a beach and sports complex around Lake Lupa, as a tenant
- 2016 - Invited to join the board of patrons of the Budapest Olympic Bid Committee
- 2017 - Together with investor partner Péter Lakatos, purchases the 100-hectare area where Lake Lupa is located to carry out developments on their own property
- 2017 - Retires from operational management of Sziget Festival after 25 years
- 2017 - Sells 70% of their ownership stake in Sziget Ltd. to an American investment fund with partners
- 2017 - Establishes GK Invest Ltd. asset management company
- 2017 - Founder and board member of the Pannon Gastronomic Academy
- 2017 - Opens Costes Beach Club at Lake Lupa with partners
- 2017 - 2019 Advisory board member of Rajk College
- 2017 - Initiator and founder of Music Hungary Music Industry Association
- 2018 - Acquires partial ownership in Akvárium Klub in the capital
- 2018 - Invests in Dorsum Plc., an IT company
- 2018 - Invited to become a member of the professional patronage board of the Budapest Public Developments Council
- 2018 - Board member of the Bocuse d'Or Academy
- 2019 - Co-owner of Digó Pizza
- 2019 - Mentor for the JÉG (Future Builders Generation) organization
- 2019 - Board member of the Winemakers' Winemaker Foundation
- 2019 - Opens the Lupa event house suitable for weddings and events
- 2020 - 2022 Opens and operates Nudli Pasta Canteen with András Jókuti, offering Hungarian pasta dishes
- 2020 - Opens a restaurant named Rumour in downtown Budapest with star chef Jenő Rácz
- 2020 - Becomes owner of the company manufacturing and distributing Budapest Beer through Budapest Park
- 2021 - Costes seasonal pop-up unit opens in Szigliget Castle Courtyard
- 2022 - Opens Costes Izakaya, an Asian-style fine bistro and bar, in place of Nudli
- 2022 - Joins Bibo Franchise Ltd. as an investor, a domestic company developing, manufacturing, and distributing environmentally conscious products
- 2022 - Founding curator of the Create Freely Foundation and Youth Creative Competition
- 2022 - Invited to become a member of the advisory board of Szemlélek value magazine
- 2022 - Opens Kismező bistro on Nagymező Street as co-owner
- 2022 - Participates in the mentor program of the National Association of Managers
- 2022 - Sells remaining 30% stake in Sziget Cultural Management Inc.
- 2022 - Takes over the operation of Unik Mlyny university club in Bratislava with Dunaj Club
- 2023 - Founding member of Forbes Business Club
- 2023 - Dunaj Club moves to a new, significantly larger location
- 2023 - Costes Group and Konyhakör establish their joint venture, Costes Catering
- 2023 - Opens Lizsé Bistro in City Park with partners
- 2024 - Costes Group acquires 50% of MÁK restaurant
- 2025 - Costes Group operates with 20 restaurants

== Awards and recognitions ==
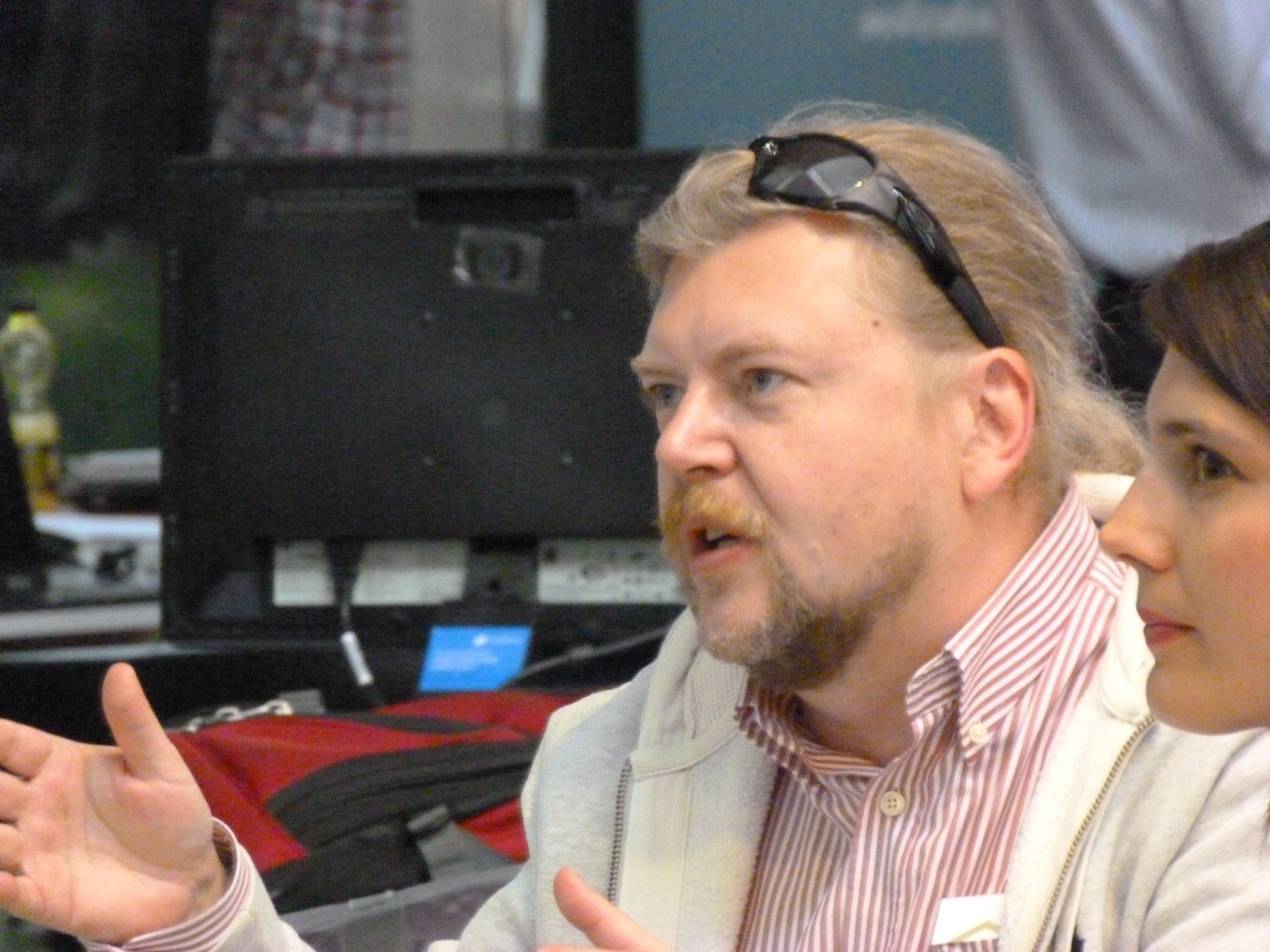
Károly Gerendai – 2015

Károly Gerendai has received numerous awards and recognitions for his activities to date

- In 1998, a jury appointed by Magyar Hírlap selects him as Man of the Year;
- In 2000, he receives the Budapest Award from the city council for organizing Sziget;
- In 2001, he receives the Golden Titan Award from the Ministry of Youth and Sports;
- In 2002, he is awarded the Knight's Cross of the Order of Merit of the Hungarian Republic "for his outstanding work in creating and organizing the Sziget Festival";
- In 2003, Gerendai is selected as one of the "50 Most Successful Young People of the Year";
- In 2004, the Ministry of Economy and Transport awards him the Pro Turismo Award;
- In 2005, he receives the Entrepreneur of the Year Award from the Association of Entrepreneurs;
- In 2006, Népszabadság Top Publications selects him as one of the "50 Most Influential Hungarians";
- From 2008 to 2013, the Marketing&Media magazine selects him as one of the 50 Most Influential Media Personalities;
- In 2008, Károly Gerendai receives the Ernst and Young "Entrepreneur of the Year" award, as decided by the independent jury;
- In 2008, the two most recognized domestic rating forums, Alexandra Guide and Dining Guide Hungary, choose Costes as the best restaurant in Hungary;
- In 2009, he receives the Artisjus Award for launching the Day of Hungarian Song;
- In 2010, his restaurant, Costes - as the first Hungarian restaurant - receives a Michelin star, and the Central European edition of Gault Millau awards them 17 points;
- In 2010, he receives the Officer's Cross of the Order of Merit of the Hungarian Republic for his cultural organizing activities.;
- In 2010, he receives the Miklós Radnóti Anti-Racist Award;
- In 2010, he receives the Golden Brain Award from the Hungarian Advertising Association in the "Client of the Year" category;
- Since 2011, Costes successfully maintains its Michelin star every year, while in 2011 Gault Millau already rated the restaurant 18 points, which is equivalent to 2 Michelin stars (this was the highest score in the entire Central-Eastern European region at that time);
- In 2011, Sziget wins the Best European Festival award at the European Festival Awards;
- In 2012, the Budapest City Council again awards Gerendai the Budapest Medal for his cultural mediation activities;
- In 2012, the Sziget Organization's Balaton Sound event wins the "Best Medium-Sized Festival" award at the European Festival Awards;
- In 2013, the B My Lake festival proves to be the best new event at the European Festival Awards;
- In 2014, he receives a lifetime achievement award at the Best of Budapest and Hungary gala in recognition of his gastronomic and tourism activities;
- In 2014, for the first time in the history of the award, there is a repeat when the Sziget festival receives the best major festival award for the second time at the European Festival Awards;
- In 2015, Tourism Magazine selects him as the most influential professional in domestic tourism, and he has been featured in the tourism top 50 publication every year since, although the ranking has since been discontinued;
- In 2015, experts invited by Világgazdaság magazine select him as the 9th most influential Hungarian businessman in their Top 100 publication;
- In 2016, the Sziget Organization's VOLT Festival event wins the "Best Medium-Sized Festival" award at the European Festival Awards, where Sziget wins the "Best Line-up" award, which it brings home again in 2018;
- In 2016, Costes Downtown also receives a Michelin star, which it successfully maintains until 2022;
- In 2016, Károly Gerendai is chosen as the gastro hero of the year in Playboy's "Man of the Year" vote;
- 2016 - 2018 Budapest Park wins the Best Outdoor Venue award at the BPNA;
- In 2017, Sziget becomes the performers' favorite festival, thus winning awards in all categories over the years at the European Festival Awards;
- In 2017, at the Tourism Summit event, he uniquely receives the Pro Turismo Award for the second time (he received the first one in 2004);
- 2017-2021 both restaurants of the Costes Group are among the top 10 Hungarian restaurants according to Dining Guide;
- In 2018, he is awarded the National Association of Managers' Managers for Society 2018 Special Award;
- 2019 Dorsum Plc wins 2nd place award at the KKT Top 100 award ceremony in the "service" category;
- 2019 Budapest Park wins the Best Concert Venue award at the BPNA;
- 2020 Digó pizza is chosen as the 8th best in Europe on the big 7 top list;
- 2021-2022-2023 all three restaurants of the Costes Group are selected in the Hungarian top 12 according to Dining Guide's evaluation, with Rumour restaurant ranking first in 2022;
- In 2022, his restaurant Rumour, opened with Jenő Rácz, also receives a Michelin star;
- In 2023, Digó pizza is featured in the 50 Top Pizza Europa 2023 publication;
- In 2024, with the opening of Vibe Budapest, he introduces a new concept to the domestic gastronomic and entertainment industry sector.
