= Ladislao =

Other names
- Related names: Vladislav, Władysław

Ladislao is a given name, a Hispanic variant of Vladislav. Notable people with the name include:

- Ladislao Bonus, Filipino composer dubbed the "Father of Filipino Opera"
- Ladislao Cabrera, Bolivian hero during the War of the Pacific
- Ladislao Diwa, Filipino patriot
- Ladislao Martínez, Puerto Rico musician
- László Kubala (1927–2002), Hungarian footballer, known as Ladislao Kubala in Spanish
- Ladislao Mazurkiewicz, Uruguayan former goalkeeper
- Ladislao Vajda, Hungarian film director
- Ladislao Errázuriz Lazcano, Chilean lawyer and politician

== See also ==
- Ladislao, Ladislas, Ladislaus, Ladislav, László, Vladislav/Vladislava/Vladek, Vladyslav/Volodyslav, Władysław/Władek
