= Władysław =

Władysław is a Polish given male name, cognate with Vladislav. The feminine form is Władysława, archaic forms are Włodzisław (male) and Włodzisława (female). Variations in other languages may be found in the article "Vladislav". These names may refer to:

== People ==
=== Mononym ===
- Włodzisław, Duke of Lendians (10th century)
- Władysław I Herman (ca. 1044–1102), Duke of Poland
- Władysław II the Exile (1105–1159), High Duke of Poland and Duke of Silesia
- Władysław III Spindleshanks (1161/67–1231), Duke of Poland
- Władysław Opolski (1225/1227-1281/1282), Polish duke
- Władysław of Salzburg (1237–1270), Polish Roman Catholic archbishop
- Władysław I the Elbow-high (1261–1333), King of Poland
- Władysław of Oświęcim (c. 1275–1324), Duke of Oświęcim
- Władysław of Bytom (c. 1277–c. 1352), Polish noble
- Władysław of Legnica (1296–after 1352), Duke of Legnica
- Władysław the Hunchback (c. 1303-c. 1352), Polish prince
- Władysław the White (c. 1327–1388), Duke of Gniewkowo
- Władysław II of Opole (c. 1332 – 1401), Polish duke
- Władysław II Jagiełło (1351–1434), Grand Duke of Lithuania and King of Poland
- Władysław I of Płock (c. 1406-1455), Polish noble
- Władysław of Głogów (c. 1420–1460), Silesian nobleman
- Władysław III of Poland (1424–1444), King of Poland, and King of Hungary
- Władysław of Zator (1455–1494), Duke of Zator
- Władysław IV Vasa (1595–1648), King of the Polish-Lithuanian Commonwealth

=== Given name ===
==== Władysław ====
- Władysław Anders (1892–1970), Polish general and politician
- Władysław Bartoszewski (1922–2015), Polish politician and activist
- Władysław Bełza (1847–1913), Polish poet
- Władysław Bobowski (1932–2025), Polish Roman Catholic bishop
- Władysław Bortnowski (1891–1966), Polish historian and general
- Władysław Bukowiński (1904–1974), Polish Roman Catholic priest
- Władysław Czachórski (1850–1911), Polish painter
- Władysław Czartoryski (1828–1894), Polish noble and political activist
- Władysław Daniłowski (1902–2000), Polish–American pianist, composer and singer
- Władysław Derdacki (1882–1951), Polish architect
- Władysław Gomułka (1905–1982), Polish politician
- Władysław Grabski (1874–1938), Polish politician, economist and historian
- Władysław Hańcza (1905–1977), Polish actor and theatre director
- Władysław Hasior (1928–1999), Polish sculptor and painter
- Władysław Horodecki (1863–1930), Polish architect
- Władysław Filipkowski (1892–1950), Polish general
- Władysław Franciszek Jabłonowski (1769–1802), Polish and French general
- Władysław Komar (1940–1998), Polish shot putter
- Władysław Konopczyński (1880–1952), Polish historian
- Władysław Kopaliński (1907–2007), Polish lexicographer, publisher, writer and translator
- Władysław Kosiniak-Kamysz (born 1981), Polish politician
- Władysław Kowalski (disambiguation), several people
- Władysław Kozakiewicz (born 1953), Polish pole vaulter
- Wladyslaw Lizon (born 1954), Canadian politician
- Władysław Malecki (1836–1900), Polish painter
- Władysław Marcinkowski (1858–1947), Polish sculptor
- Władysław Orlicz (1903–1990), Polish mathematician
- Władysław Pasikowski (born 1959), Polish film director and screenwriter
- Władysław Podkowiński (1866–1895), Polish painter and illustrator
- Władysław Raczkiewicz (1885–1947), President of Poland from 1939 to 1947
- Władysław Raginis (1908–1939), Polish military commander
- Władysław Reymont (1867–1925), Polish novelist and 1924 laureate of the Nobel Prize in Literature
- Władysław Sadłowski (1869–1940), Polish architect
- Władysław Siemaszko (1919–2025), Polish publicist and lawyer
- Władysław Sikorski (1881–1943), Polish military and political leader
- Władysław Śleboda (1925–2025), Polish politician
- Władysław Ślebodziński (1884–1972), Polish mathematician
- Władysław Ślewiński (1854–1918), Polish painter
- Władysław Strzemiński (1893–1952), Polish painter
- Władysław Syrokomla (1823–1862), Polish–Lithuanian poet, writer and translator
- Władysław Szpilman (1911–2000), Polish pianist and composer
- Wladislaw Taczanowski (1825–1893), German politician
- Władysław Turowicz (1908–1980), Polish-Pakistani aviator, military scientist and aeronautical engineer
- Władysław Żeleński (disambiguation), several people

==== Władysława ====
- Władysława Habicht (1867–1963), Polish activist
- Władysława Kostakówna (1908–2001), Polish spy, Miss Poland 1929
- Władysława Majerczyk (born 1952), Polish cross-country skier
- Władysława Markiewiczówna (1900–1982), Polish pianist and educator

=== Surname ===
- Blanka Wladislaw (1917–2012), Brazilian chemist

== See also ==
- Ladislao, Ladislas, Ladislaus, Ladislav, László, Vladislav/Vladislava, Vladyslav/Volodyslav, Władysław
