= Vladislava =

Female given name

- Gender: female

Origin
- Origin: Slavic

Other names
- Alternative spelling: Cyrillic: Владислава
- Related names: male form Vladislav
- See also: Vladisava

Vladislava (Cyrillic: Владислава) is a female given name.

Those bearing it include:

- Vladislava Ovcharenko (born 1986), Tajikistani track and field sprinter
- Vladislava Evtushenko (born 1996), Russian actress, dancer, model, beauty pageant
- Vladislava Tancheva (born 1987), Bulgarian rhythmic gymnast
- Vladislava Đorđević (born 1974), Serbian actress and voice actress
- Vladislava Urazova (born 2004), Russian artistic gymnast

== See also ==
- Ladislao, Ladislas, Ladislaus, Ladislav, László, Vladislav/Vladislava/Vladek, Vladyslav/Volodyslav, Władysław/Władek
