= Szőlő Street scandal =

2025 political child abuse scandal in Hungary

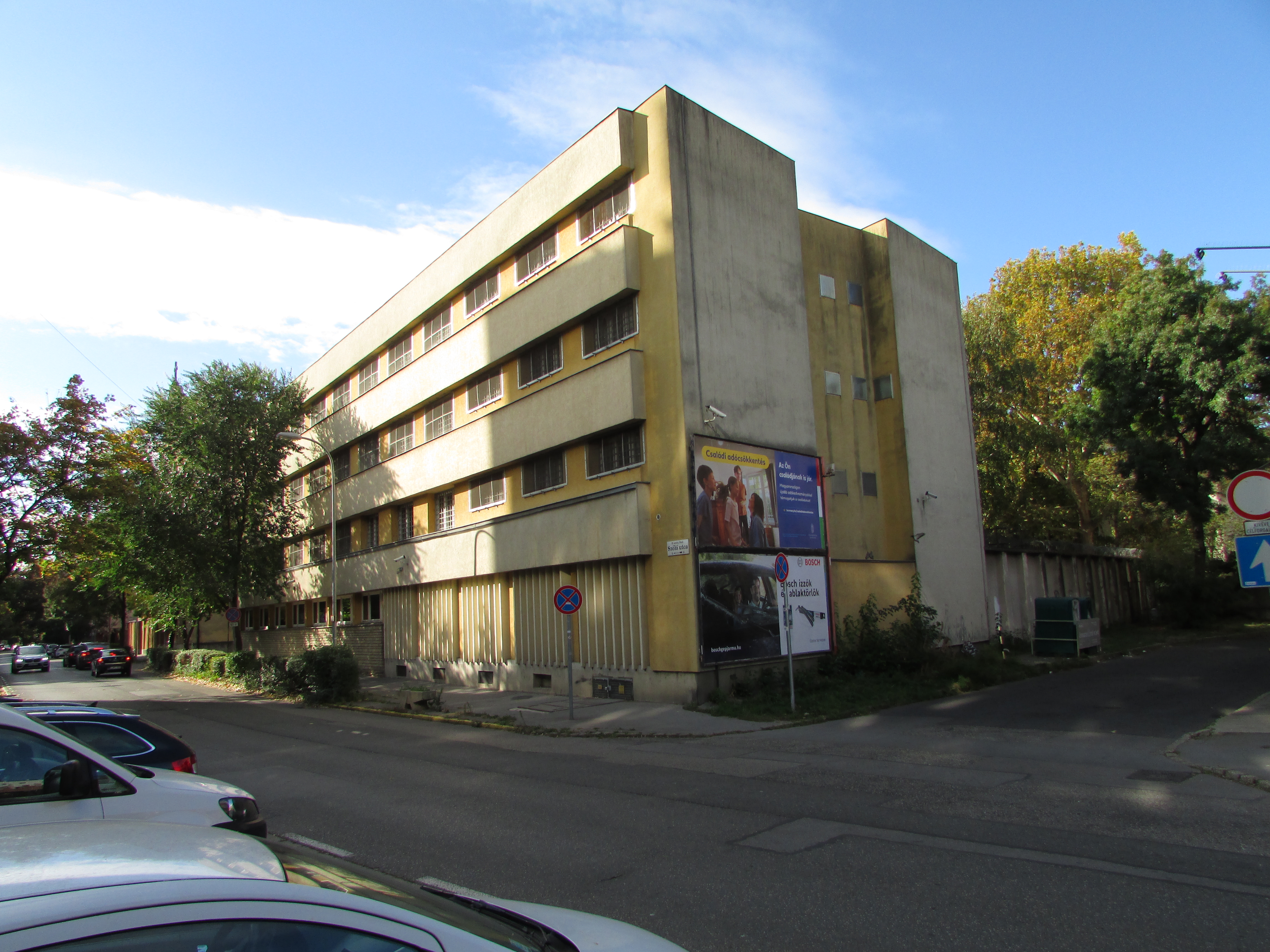
The Szőlő Street Reformatory

Location of the reformatory in Budapest, Hungary

The Szőlő Street scandal is a child abuse scandal in the Budapest Reformatory, (Note: Hungarian: Budapesti Javítóintézet [ˈbudɒpɛʃti ˈjɒviːtoːinteːzɛt]) commonly referred to as the Szőlő Street Reformatory, (Note: Hungarian: Szőlő utcai javítóintézet [ˈsøːløː ˈut͡sːɒi ˈjɒviːtoːinteːzɛt]) that began on 27 May 2025, when former director Péter Pál Juhász and his partner were arrested on suspicions of child sexual abuse and running a prostitution ring. These arrests gained political significance in September, when Gábor Kuslits, former director of the Budapest Regional Child Protection Service, claimed in an interview that Juhász's case had been known for years, but police failed to act despite reports. Kuslits claimed that this was due to two high-ranking politicians being involved in the case.

Minister of Justice Bence Tuzson announced that no member of the government and no minors are involved in this case. Despite no evidence proving it, geopolitical analyst Csaba Káncz specifically accused Deputy Prime Minister Zsolt Semjén, who when asked about this in Parliament, called these allegations a character assassination attempt. Several Fidesz politicians strongly condemned the people behind this "smear campaign". Contrary to the Justice Minister's report, multiple witnesses testified that they were molested by Péter Pál Juhász as minors, and Chief Prosecutor Gábor Bálint Nagy stated that 15 underage victims have been identified as of January 2026.

The acting director of the institution who took over after Juhász's arrest, Károly Kovács-Buna, resigned, after which security camera footage was published of him physically abusing children in his care. After his confession and arrest, state-run juvenile detention centers were placed under direct police oversight. Tisza Party, the largest opposition party, released a previously unpublished official report from 2021, which states that one-fifth of the children in state care have experienced abuse. On 20 January 2026, the Szőlő Street Reformatory was closed by the government.

Protests erupted in the capital with tens of thousands of people calling for the government's resignation. As of June 2026, eleven suspects have been interrogated in connection with this case.

== Background ==
Péter Pál Juhász was appointed as the director of the Szőlő Street Reformatory in 2011 by a Fidesz politician, the department head in the Ministry of Human Resources, despite the fact that Juhász was forced to leave two of his jobs in the past due to reports of "improper relationships" with some minors in his care (Note: The first report was in 2002, when a worker noticed Juhász taking away a 13-year-old girl at 10 p.m., who came back distraught at dawn with marks of violence on her body. Juhász claimed that these trips were "therapeutic conversations" and that "girls open up at night". In 2005, it was report that during a summer camp, Juhász was sleeping with a girl. A 2012 psychological assessment found signs of abuse regarding a girl in Juhász's care. The police terminated their investigation citing the absence of criminal activity. In 2009, after disciplinary proceedings, Juhász was dismissed from his position.) and that the head of the Municipal Child Protection Services warned the department head not to place Juhász in this kind of position.

On 27 May 2025, Péter Pál Juhász, was taken into custody on suspicion of human trafficking, forced labor, abuse of public office, and misuse of a firearm. His partner, Zamira A., who once worked as the institution's security chief, was also taken into custody on suspicion of human trafficking and forced labor. According to the charges, two women in their twenties were employed at the institution as childcare workers on paper, but in reality they worked as prostitutes, and part of their earnings went to Juhász.

Months passed after their arrests before the case gained political significance due to an interview. In early September, Gábor Kuslits, former director of the Budapest Regional Child Protection Service (Tegyesz), gave an interview to Válasz Online in which he claimed that Juhász's case of sexual exploitation and human trafficking of girls from another institution had been known within the profession for many years. According to Kuslits, in 2020, child protection guardians who had noticed Juhász's activities told a police officer what had happened to their ward, and the police officer told them to sign a confidentiality agreement, saying that they were aware of Juhász's activities and that a covert investigation was underway against him and he would be brought down, but then nothing happened. In the same interview, Kuslits claimed that two high-ranking politicians were mentioned in professional circles as having protected Juhász, but he did not name them. He said that "they used to take boys to one of them, and girls to the other". No evidence or witness has confirmed the involvement of politicians.

== Investigation ==
In November 2025, Péter Pál Juhász was further charged with repeated embezzlement resulting in particularly substantial financial loss, the use of multiple forged private documents, and money laundering committed on a commercial scale involving a significant amount.

According to a statement by the Central Investigative Prosecutor's Office, a clerk who was taken into custody in December and questioned as a suspect was placed under criminal supervision for four months. The woman is suspected of having removed furniture from Péter Pál Juhász's office to an unknown location after the investigation was ordered in order to destroy evidence and traces that could be linked to sexual crimes.

On 18 December, Péter Pál Juhász was suspected of further crimes, and a teacher, the eighth suspect in the case, was taken into custody. On 20 December, another warder was taken into custody, bringing the number of suspects in the Szőlő Street case to nine.

In February 2026, the court extended the detentions of Péter Pál Juhász, his partner, and Károly Kovács-Buna until the end of May. Chief Prosecutor Gábor Bálint Nagy stated in an interview that he hopes the investigation will have completed by summer 2026.

In June, the Central Investigative Prosecutor's Office stated that eleven suspects have been interrogated so far, with four of them being in custody.

=== Accusation of Zsolt Semjén ===
On 18 September 2025, Minister of Justice Bence Tuzson announced that according to the Ministry of Justice, no member of the government was involved in the Szőlő Street case and that a foreign intelligence service was likely also involved in the "unprecedented attack on the Hungarian government". They claim that Klára Dobrev's press statement is a malicious slander and completely unfounded. Dobrev wrote a letter to Minister of the Interior Sándor Pintér and initiated the formation of a board of inquiry in the parliament's judiciary committee, but this was voted down by Fidesz.

Csaba Káncz, known on social media as a geopolitical analyst, named specific politicians in one of his posts, including Zsolt Semjén. (Note: Active YouTuber and former politician Péter Juhász published a video where an unidentified man – who later revealed himself as János Látó – claims that "a very high ranking politician" used to regularly visit another children's home, where he would engage in sexual acts in a darkened room with underage boys. Later, when the boys were watching TV, they recognized the man's voice as Uncle Zsolti's.) Immediately after Káncz's post, government circles began discussing how the accusations were unfounded and that they would likely file a criminal complaint for defamation.

On 22 September, the first day of the autumn parliamentary session, Gergely Arató, representative of the Democratic Coalition, brought up the Szőlő Street case and questioned Prime Minister Viktor Orbán. At the end of his speech, he also addressed a question to Zsolt Semjén: "Who is Uncle Zsolti?" Orbán responded by calling the rumors a smear campaign reminiscent of communist times. After Orbán, Semjén asked to speak and said that this was a "diabolically constructed character assassination attempt". "This is the blood libel itself, the Beelzebub accusation known from the Bible. It is a blatant lie, a baseless slander. We have filed complaints." said Semjén, who then spoke about how he is a sworn enemy of pedophilia and was the first who "dared to stand up against the LGBTQ lobby". Political scientist Zoltán Lakner responded to this latter comment by saying that "malicious intent or basic ignorance" may be behind the conflation of pedophilia and the LGBTQ community.

The next day, future Prime Minister Péter Magyar, then president of the largest opposition party, Tisza Party, called on Orbán to suspend Semjén from his position as deputy prime minister until the Szőlő Street case had been investigated. He referred to the character assassination campaigns carried out by the ruling party against its political opponents over the past 15 years. Zsolt Bayer, a publicist for Magyar Nemzet, said: "If any of these allegations are true, then the government and the two ruling parties must fall."

Máté Kocsis, leader of the Fidesz parliamentary group, said on Harcosok órája (lit. 'Hour of Warriors') program that this was an unprecedented and premeditated attack against the Hungarian government and state institutions, as well as a discrediting of the police and secret services, which "must be punished in the most brutal way possible". The Fidesz faction leader announced that he would initiate a parliamentary investigation into the matter and that all available legal means would be used to dismantle the network described in the ministry's report. Kocsis also said that the background and operators of all Facebook pages that participated in the smear campaign must be revealed. He specifically mentioned the YouTube channel Testbeszéd, which analyzed Semjén's parliamentary speech in a detailed video. According to Kocsis, former politician Péter Juhász must be held accountable for his fake video, András Jámbor and Klára Dobrev must leave public life, and even Péter Magyar could be in trouble.

Tamás Menczer, communications director for Fidesz, stated at a forum called Váci Polgári Est (lit. 'Vác Civic Evening'): "They will all be reported, and each of them will answer for this despicable act before the courts." Feró Nagy, who also appeared at the forum, added: "Attacks on the government must be countered immediately."

Semjén stated on ATV's Straight Talk program that the accusations against him are not only false but also impossible, since, according to the prime minister, he is unfamiliar with child protection institutions and has never been in the vicinity of such an institution. Gergely Gulyás said "No sane, sensible person would ever have thought that any member of the government could be involved in such a scandal." Prime Minister Viktor Orbán said of Semjén: "I'm not saying he's a saint, but he's almost one."

On 20 January 2026, a man – presumed by 444 to be Csaba Káncz – was indicted by the Prosecution Service for the libel of two high-ranking politicians.

=== Underage victims ===
On 24 September, Minister of Justice Bence Tuzson published the ministerial report he had prepared at the government's request on the allegations concerning criminal proceedings at the Szőlő Street Reformatory. However, the decree authorizing the minister to prepare the report was not published in the Hungarian Gazette until 1 p.m., while Tuzson posted about it at 11:59. The report was completed within two days. Tuzson listed the findings of the report, including that no minors or politicians were mentioned in the criminal case, that there was no doubt about the innocence of the ministers, and that foreign secret service involvement had also been raised in the case. According to the report, Csaba Káncz was also questioned as a witness, and he said that he had no evidence in the case and that he had obtained his statements from an influential member of a nationally-known influential political family. The report concludes that the investigation will continue in order to uncover "further connections to organized, coordinated action against the government".

Despite Tuzson's report, according to information from HVG, new witnesses were heard in the case, who claimed in their testimony that Péter Pál Juhász had molested them. The boys in question were 14–15 years old when they were admitted to the institution.

On 17 December, Chief Prosecutor Gábor Bálint Nagy responded to a question from Momentum representative Endre Tóth, saying that there are minors involved in the Szőlő Street case. MP András Jámbor called for an extraordinary parliamentary session shortly before 2 a.m. on 18 December to discuss the matter. The session was adjourned after fifteen minutes because the Fidesz–KDNP representatives did not show up.

Former politician Péter Juhász interviewed a juvenile who had been in several reformatories and who claimed to have reported Péter Pál Juhász's activities as early as 2023, but nothing happened.

In January 2026, Chief Prosecutor Gábor Bálint Nagy stated that 15 underage victims have been identified. According to a letter obtained by HVG, the Ministry of National Resources had requested information regarding Péter Pál Juhász's suspicious activities with three girls in 2013.

In February, 444 obtained a witness statement, in which a girl – who was not detained – stated that Péter Pál Juhász had sexually abused her.

In July, a former resident of the Szőlő Street Reformatory, Sándor Bangó, named Uncle Zsolti as Former Deputy Prime Minister Zsolt Semjén. Bangó had said in previous months that he had been raped as a child by Péter Pál Juhász and Uncle Zsolti. Fidesz–KDNP immediately issued a statement claiming the accusation to be defamation, an absurd lie, and obvious political manipulation. In October, the prosecutor's office dropped charges against Péter Pál Juhász in Bangó's case.

=== Károly Kovács-Buna ===
External videos
- Video of the assault by Former Director Károly Kovács-Buna and footage of a beating lasting for minutes by another worker

On 8 December, Károly Kovács-Buna, acting director of the Szőlő Street Reformatory, submitted his resignation, which was accepted by the Directorate-General for Social Affairs and Child Protection (SZGYF). He justified his decision by saying that a full-blown "smear campaign" had been launched against him in the press and that it was impossible to work under such difficult circumstances. With this last remark, the acting director was probably also referring to the fact that former politician Péter Juhász wrote on Facebook on Monday that he would be releasing new videos about the director. Péter Juhász had already published a video over the weekend containing recordings and allegations about Kovács-Buna's abuses of power. Kovács-Buna took over the management of the Szőlő Street Reformatory after Péter Pál Juhász was arrested in May.

On 9 December, two people – including Kovács-Buna – were taken into custody and one person was arrested after authorities continued their investigation on Tuesday. Uniformed officers from the National Bureau of Investigation (KR NNI) began the operation at around 10 a.m. at the Szőlő Street Reformatory, where several police vehicles were present and with drones flying. The prosecutor's office announced on Tuesday morning that two police agencies, the KR NNI and the National Defense Service (NVSZ), were also involved in the proceedings. They wrote that the Budapest Regional Investigative Prosecutor's Office is currently conducting proceedings at several locations with considerable force, drawing in child protection specialists.

At noon on the same day, Péter Juhász published security camera footage in which Kovács-Buna can be seen bashing a boy's head into a table and throwing him to the ground, then beating him, kneeling on him, and repeatedly kicking him. Kovács-Buna admitted to RTL on Monday that he is the person in the recordings. Péter Juhász released another footage, where a man threw a boy to the ground, where he beat him for minutes. After the release of the video, government politicians attempted to lighten the situation by emphasizing that this institution was not an orphanage, but "practically a prison", with Minister Gergely Gulyás listing the crimes the boys are accused of, which included three cases of murder, four cases of sexual violence, two cases of threatening with terrorist act, five cases of theft and aggravated assault. Psychologists stressed that nobody should be treated the way they were regardless of what they had committed.

After the videos were made public, future Prime Minister Péter Magyar, then president of the largest opposition party, Tisza Party, said that the government must resign and called on President Tamás Sulyok to call early elections. In January 2026, the Central Investigative Prosecutor's Office issued a statement saying that the act recorded on the leaked video became known to the Prosecution Service only after the detention of Péter Pál Juhász. They emphasized that it is now time-barred, therefore no investigation could have been initiated.

== Child abuse case near Ózd ==
On 19 September, active YouTuber and former politician Péter Juhász published a video in connection with a children's home "near Ózd", thus unrelated to the Szőlő Street case. Nonetheless, the media, rumors, and public discourse have conflated the two cases. This is where the term "Uncle Zsolti" (originally Uncle Zsolt) comes from.

Péter Juhász was a guest on Partizán's live show on 2 October, after police officers showed up at his home that morning to conduct a search, where they seized evidence in the Szőlő Street case. Juhász reported that he was surprised when five police officers arrived at his home at 9:45 with a warrant that clearly stated that his home was being searched in connection with the Szőlő Street case, even though he had never spoken about the case and knew nothing about it.

Despite the fact that Péter Juhász only had an audio recording of the case near Ózd, the police went to his home in connection with the Szőlő Street case. According to him, they justified their action by saying that "high-ranking politicians may be involved in both cases", thus linking them together. He handed over the phone containing the audio recording of "Uncle Zsolt" to the police officers, but they confiscated all of his electronic devices. That afternoon, Máté Kocsis named on his Facebook page the source in Péter Juhász's video who accused Uncle Zsolt, an unnamed politician, of child sexual abuse. He also listed statements about him that, in his opinion, cast doubt on his credibility. On Partizán, Péter Juhász acknowledged that it was indeed the person posted by Kocsis, who, according to him, had not been hiding, but did not want to expose himself because he only knew what he had already said in the video.

One day after the house search, Péter Juhász was questioned as a witness for more than four hours at the Central Investigative Prosecutor's Office in connection with the Uncle Zsolt video. Juhász stated that no defamation (as mentioned by Máté Kocsis) was discussed, and that the prosecutor's office was interested in finding out what cases of child abuse had been reported to Juhász.

== Reactions, aftermath ==
When asked during an interview at Fidesz's Peace March on October 23, Feró Nagy, a musician close to the government, said "He was just making money with it, running girls, the girls were making money with it too, everyone was happy, right?" Local councilor of Őrbottyán Emese Deák wrote on her page that she found the words of the town's honorary citizen outrageous and saddening. Zsolt Bayer sent a message to Nagy asking him to apologize for his statement, but the musician felt that this was unnecessary. János Lázár told a press conference that the government would not revoke the award, referring to Nagy's Kossuth Award, which, like his honorary citizenship, many also wanted to strip the musician of.

At his annual parliamentary hearing, Minister of the Interior Sándor Pintér said he would resign from his post if it turned out that a police commissioner he had appointed had made a mistake in the case.

On 10 December, a decree was issued stating that reformatories would henceforth be maintained by the prison service. The decree was announced at the government briefing that day by Gergely Gulyás, who said that such institutions should not be maintained within the social welfare system. He said they hope this will put an end to the conditions that have been made public. After the report, the police also went to other institutions involved.

External videos
- Video of the assault, during which a worker is hitting a boy's head

On 12 December, Péter Juhász released another video about the abuse that took place at the Szőlő Street Reformatory, where a worker can be seen hitting a boy's head with a stick.

On 12 December, the Tisza Party released a previously unpublished official report from 2021 from the National Child Protection Service, which provides an overview of the conditions in child protection and the abuse suffered by children placed in state care. This document states that one-fifth of the children in state care have experienced emotional, psychological, physical, or even sexual abuse. The guardians also reported that the system is extremely understaffed, and said that even when they reported cases of abuse, the procedures were often conducted in an unprofessional manner. The Ministry of Interior stated that the document was in circulation among child protection facilities as early as 2022 in order to help their work and unveil the possible risks in child protection. The ministry stated that 3428 reports were made on suspicion of child abuse, which according to the ministry proves the opposite what Péter Magyar, the Tisza Party's leader implied.

On 13 December, the Directorate of Social Affairs and Child Protection issued an open letter, in which they asked the public not to generalize from isolated cases, because this does not help the work of their colleagues who are devoted to help children with troubled lives.

The appointment of László Balázs Varga as head of the institution, who was appointed to replace Károly Kovács-Buna, was revoked effective December 17, and János Nick was appointed director the following day.

On 19 December, the 2019 Duna TV broadcast featuring the Szőlő Street Reformatory was removed from the YouTube channel of the public media program Kékfény. The program features, among others, Péter Pál Juhász, Juhász's partner, and Károly Kovács-Buna. The video later appeared on the pro-government Ellenpont YouTube channel, embedded in an Origo article, heavily edited. The video, cut from 15 minutes to 6 minutes, attempts to support the government's narrative that the "Szőlő Street institution is a prison" where dangerous criminals are held.

On behalf of Telex, 21 Research Center conducted a survey among the Hungarian population, which showed that even Fidesz's supporters are divided on the Szőlő Street case. In his joint annual review speech with László Kéri, Péter Magyar, president of the Tisza party, said that internal polls showed Tisza's biggest lead over Fidesz to date following the scandals on Szőlő Street.

According to those attending the Digitális Polgári Kör (lit. 'Digital Civic Circle', DPK) meeting in Szeged, the government is handling the Szőlő Street case well, and some even believe that the whole thing has been blown out of proportion. Conservative journalist András Bencsik stated: "I'm not going to cry over criminals." According to President Tamás Sulyok, he does not have the opportunity to actively engage in child protection issues, according to a statement he made after 444 contacted him regarding Péter Magyar's demonstration, where protesters called on Sulyok to take action.

In May, after the change of government, five parliamentary inquiry committees were established, including "The Committee of Inquiry into the Systemic Crisis in Child Protection".

=== Demonstrations ===
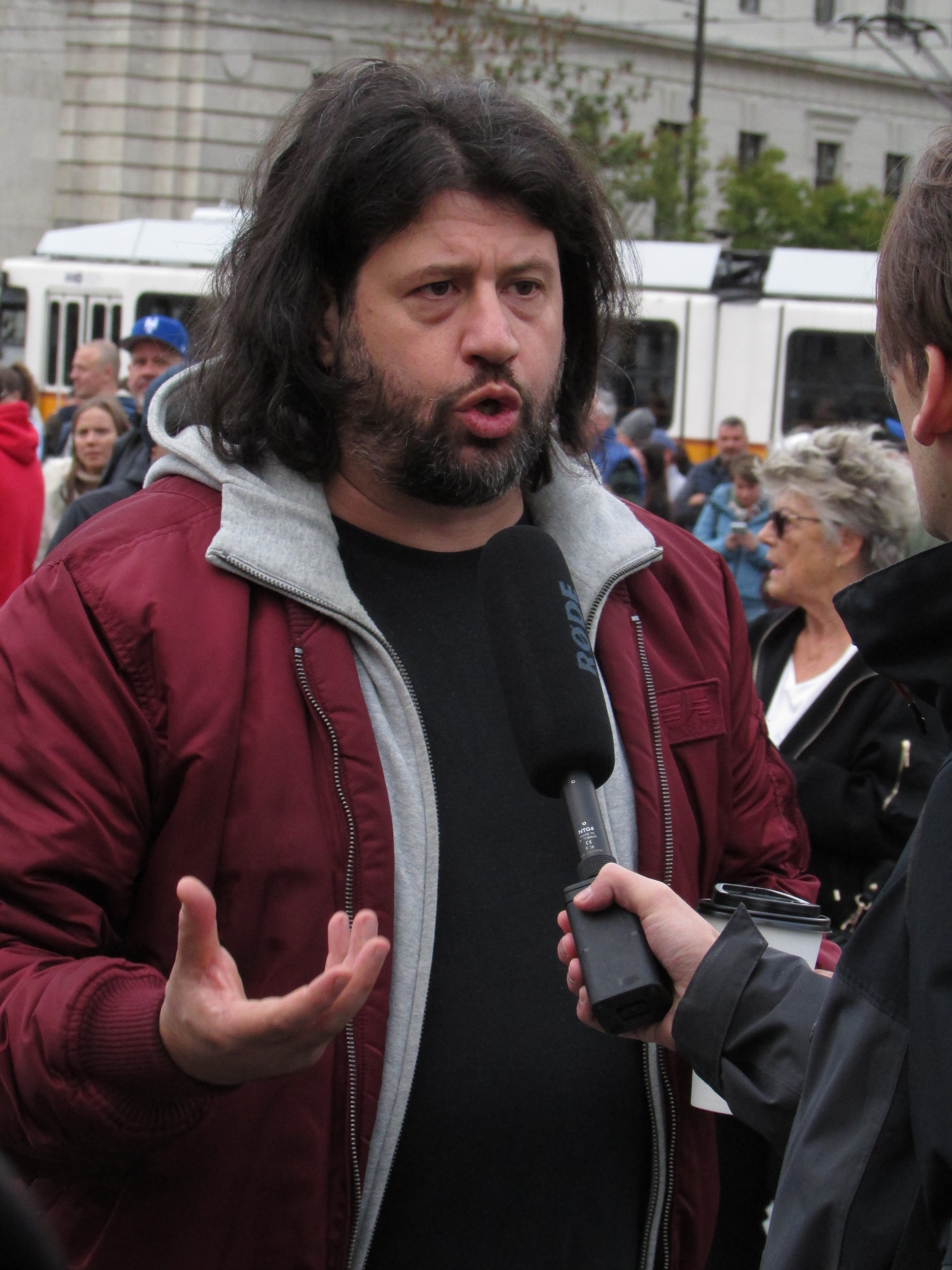
Róbert Puzsér

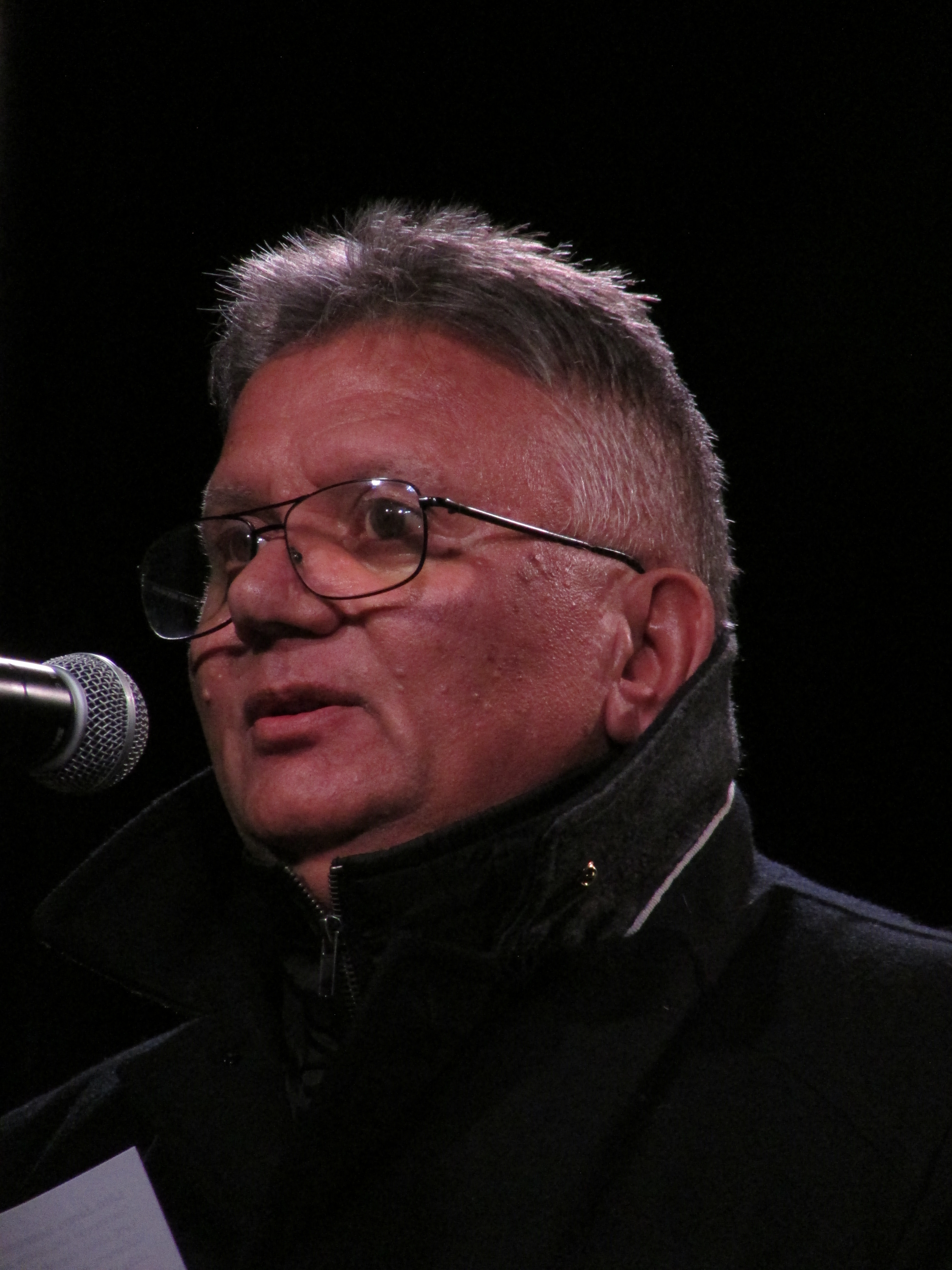
János Látó

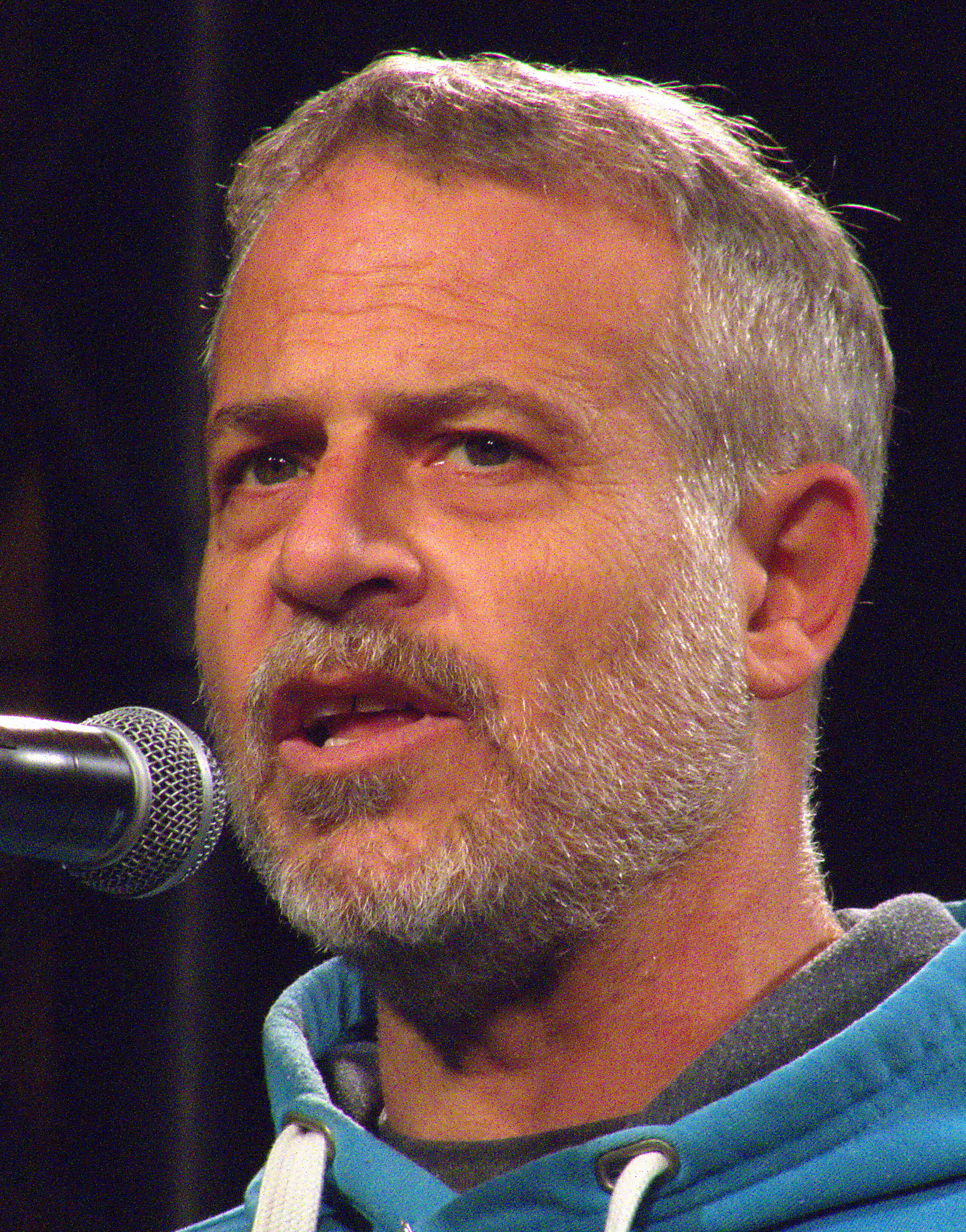
Péter Juhász

Speakers at the 5 October Polgári Ellenállás (lit. 'Civil Resistance') protest

Publicist Róbert Puzsér, the man behind the idea of the Polgári Ellenállás (lit. 'Civil Resistance') demonstration organized in the summer of 2025, also spoke out on the matter and postponed the demonstration called "Reconciliation March" planned for October 5 due to the search at Péter Juhász's home. Puzsér wrote that the two cases were unrelated, but Máté Kocsis, leader of the Fidesz parliamentary group, made it clear that the search was carried out with the express intention of retaliation. According to Puzsér, however, "the fact that the prosecutor's office seized Péter Juhász's electronic devices in a case in which he was not involved in any way proves beyond a shadow of a doubt that a political crackdown is taking place against him."

Among those who spoke at the demonstration held on 5 October was János Látó, who first mentioned Uncle Zsolt in the audio recording made public by Péter Juhász. In his speech, he did not share any new information about what happened at the children's home near Ózd. The prosecutor's office later questioned János Látó as a witness, who made several contradictory statements and was unable to provide any information that could have identified the victims of Uncle Zsolt. Látó declined to take a polygraph test.

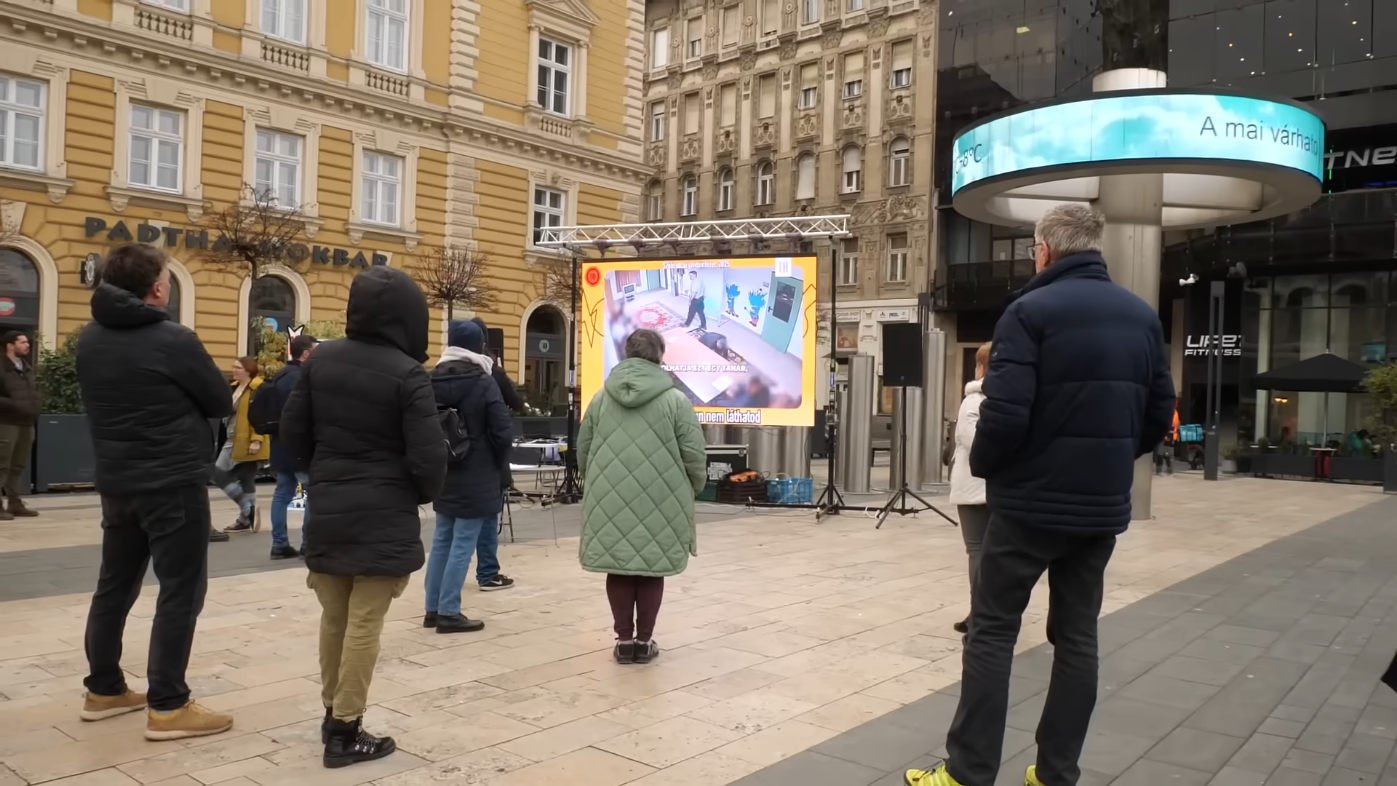
Passersby watching the security camera footage at Nyugati Square

On 11 December 2025, the Hungarian Two-Tailed Dog Party (MKKP) screened Péter Juhász's video on a projector set up in Nyugati Square in Budapest from morning until afternoon. On 12 December 2025, Péter Juhász released another video about the abuse that took place at the Szőlő Street Reformatory, where a worker can be seen hitting a boy's head with a stick. On 13 December, Puzsér and Juhász gave an interview to Kontroll, in which the latter once again brought up the high-ranking politician named "Zsolt", who may be involved in abuse cases. According to Juhász, three different sources made statements to him, but none of them can be proven. In an interview with Mandiner, Prime Minister Viktor Orbán stated, "Not even a young criminal should be treated the way this prison guard treated the prisoner. This is unacceptable, no question about it."

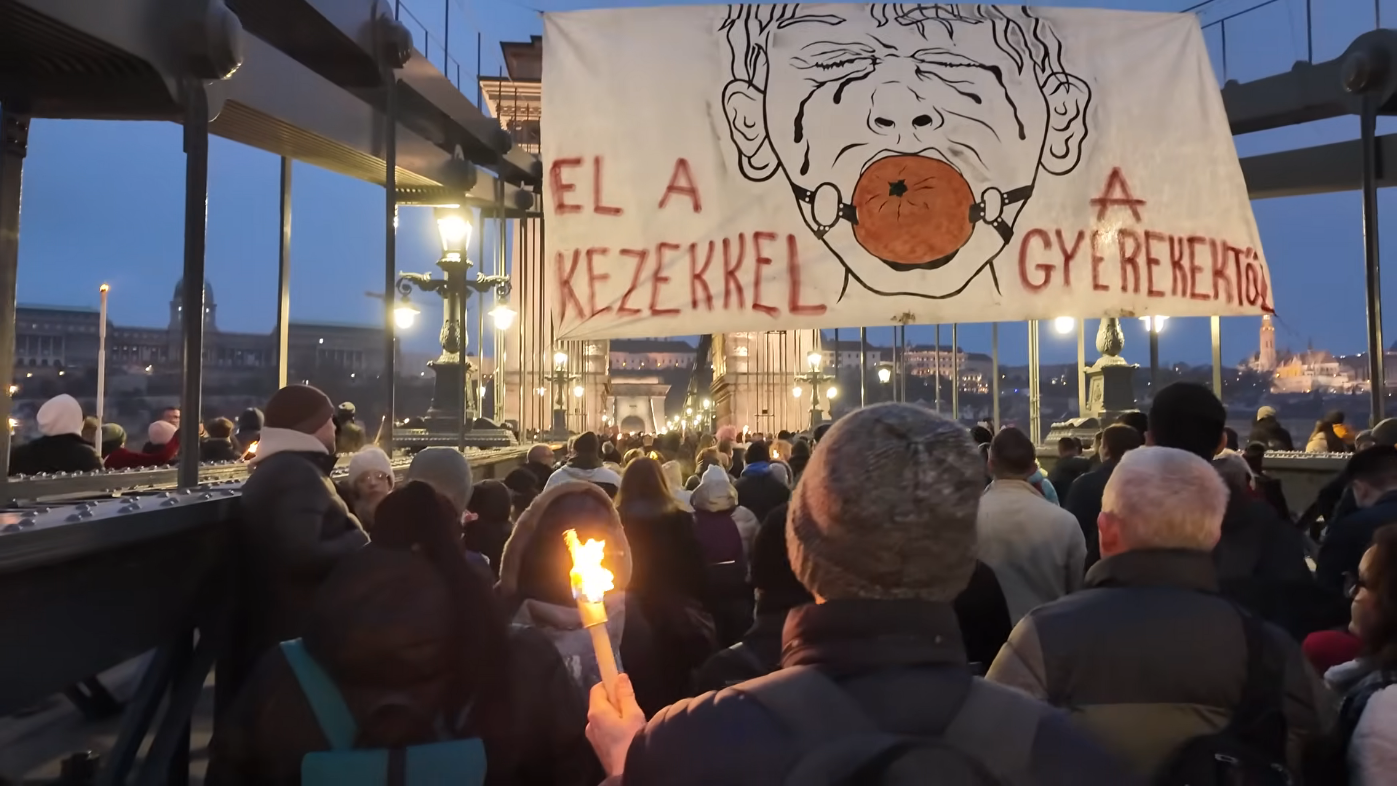
Protesters at Magyar's 13 December protest. The banner depicts a crying child being gagged by an orange, associated with the ruling Fidesz party, with the text "Hands off the children!"

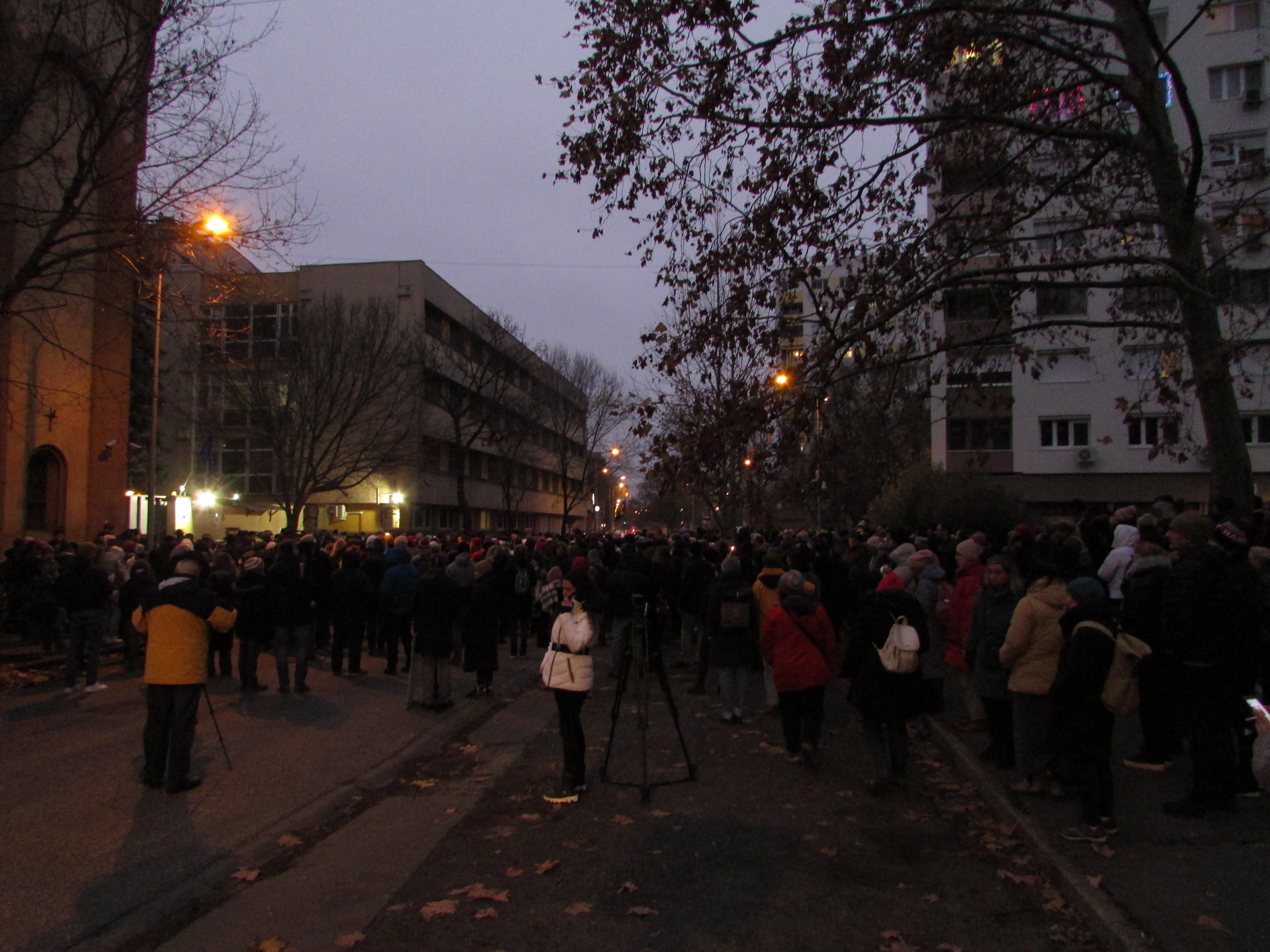
The silent protest held in front of the Szőlő Street Reformatory on 14 December

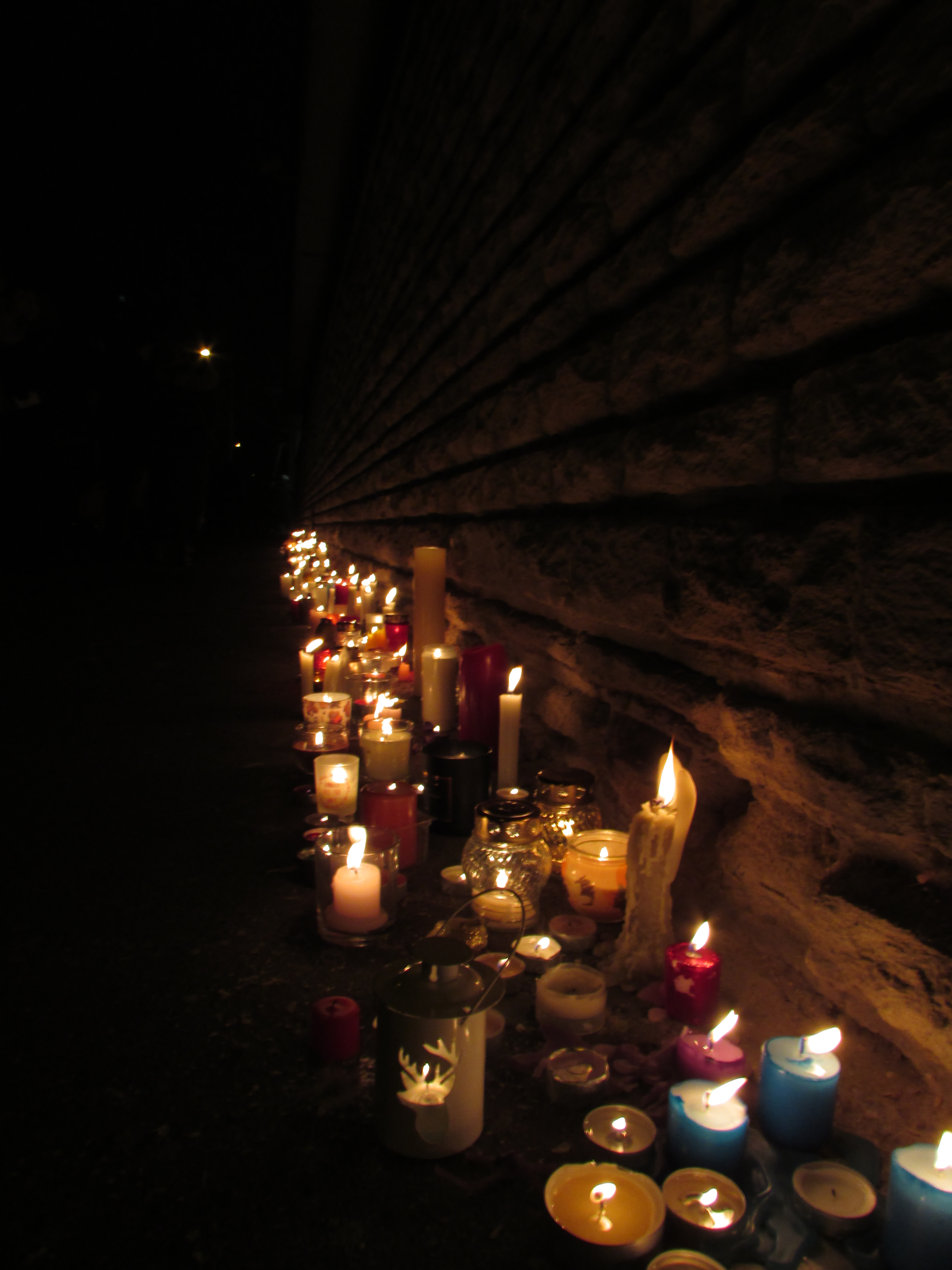
Candles lit by the wall of the reformatory

Opposition MPs in parliament have called for an extraordinary session on 17 December to discuss the matter. Péter Magyar organized a demonstration with tens of thousands of people attending for 13 December at Deák Ferenc Square, from where they marched over the Danube to the Carmelite Monastery of Buda, the Prime Minister's office. During his speech, Magyar drew parallels between this and the 2024 child abuse scandal. Róbert Puzsér and Polgári Ellenállás (lit. 'Civil Resistance') announced a silent protest – without speeches or music – for 14 December in front of the reformatory, where they lit candles and torches.

=== Closure ===
On 19 January, the government announced the closure of the Szőlő Street Reformatory the next day, and that boys will be taken to the Aszód, Debrecen, or Nagykanizsa Reformatory. According to Telex, sixty employees lost their jobs at the closing reformatory without being offered an alternative one.

In March, the building of the Szőlő Street Reformatory was auctioned off to Market Asset Management Zrt., a company related to Sándor Scheer. The company stated that it plans to demolish the building and build apartments in its place.

== See also ==
- Katalin Novák presidential pardon scandal – 2024 political scandal in Hungary
