= Tibor Hajdu =

Hungarian historian (1930–2025)

Tibor Hajdu (27 August 1930 – 28 August 2025) was a Hungarian historian.

== Life and career ==
Hajdu was born in Budapest on 27 August 1930. Throughout his career, Hajdu published a number of books related to Hungarian and Soviet history.

He was awarded the State Prize of the Hungarian People's Republic in 1970.

Hajdu died on 28 August 2025, at the age of 95.
