= Vladislav =

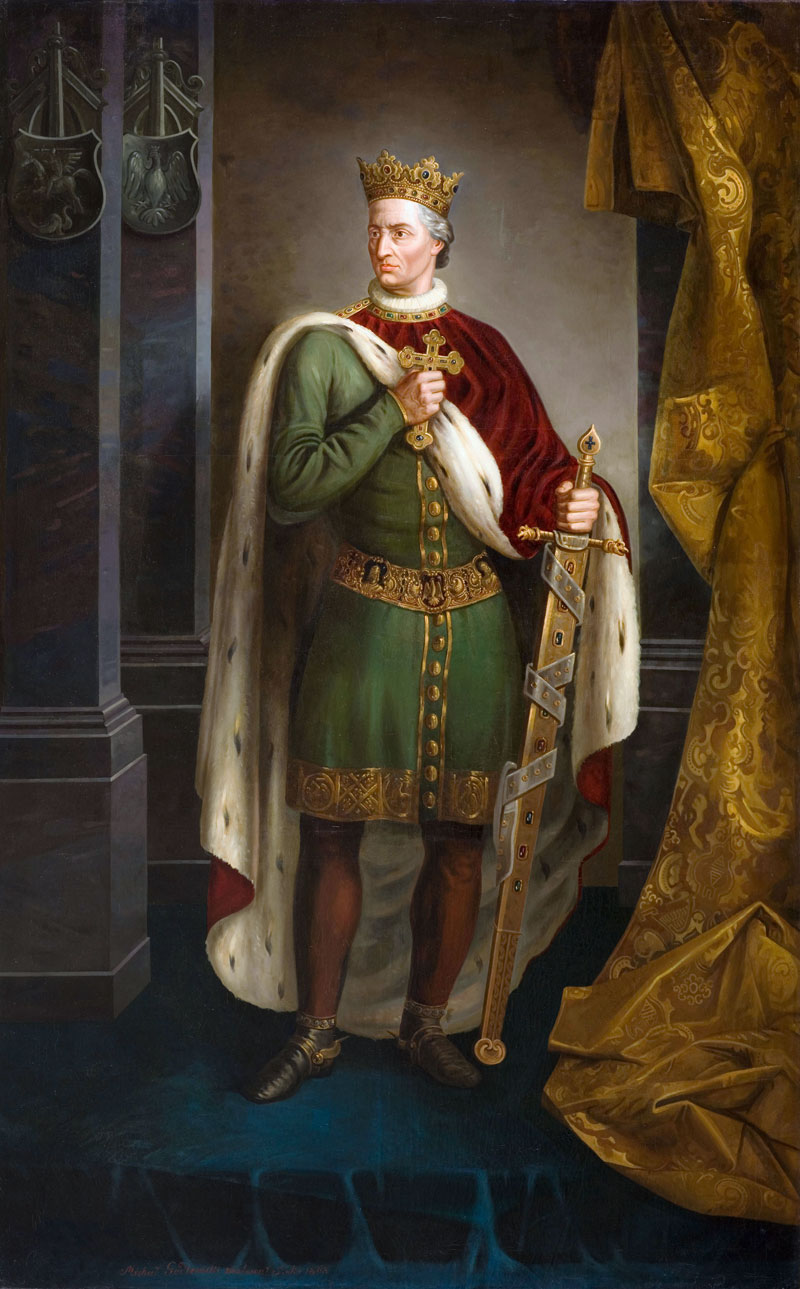
- Władysław II Jagiełło, King of Poland
- Gender: male
- Language: Slavic
- Name day: 27 June

Origin
- Origin: Slavic
- Meaning: possessor of the glory, fame, the one who is famous for order

Other names
- Alternative spelling: Cyrillic: Владислав
- Variant forms: Vladyslav, Władysław
- Related names: female form Vladislava
- See also: Vladisav, Volodyslav, Ladislao, Ladislav, Ladislaus, Ŭladzislaŭ, Ulászló, László

Vladislav (Belarusian: Уладзіслаў (Uladzislaŭ, Uładzisłaŭ); Polish: Władysław, Włodzisław; Russian, Ukrainian, Bulgarian, Macedonian, Serbo-Croatian Cyrillic: Владислав, Latin: Ladislaus) is a male given name of Slavic origin. Variations include Volodislav, Vlastislav and Vlaslav. In the Czech Republic, Slovakia and Croatia, the common variation is Ladislav.

Outside of Slavic and Eastern Romance countries, it is sometimes latinized as either Vladislaus or Vladislas. Spanish forms include Ladislao and Uladislao. The Portuguese form is Ladislau and the Romanian forms are Vladislav and Ladislau. The Hungarian form is László.

In Russian-speaking countries, it is usually colloquially shortened to either Vlad (Влад) or Vladik (Владик).

The feminine form of the name Vladislav is Vladislava or, in Polish spelling, Władysława.

== Origin ==
The name Vladislav literally means 'one who owns a glory', or simply 'famous'. It is a composite name derived from two Slavic roots: Vlad-, meaning either 'to own' (Ukrainian volodity [володiти] means 'to own', Polish władać ['to possess'], Russian vladet [владеть 'to own']), or 'to rule' (another meaning of Polish władać is 'to rule'. Ukrainian vlada [влада] means 'power', 'the government'; in Slovak and Czech, vláda means ruling body, government in modern form, vládnuť (vládnout) means 'to rule', vládca [vládce] is 'ruler'), and slav-, meaning 'fame'/'glory'. It has also extended into Romania and Moldova, which are non-Slavic countries.

== People with the name ==
=== Mononymous uses ===
- Vladislav, a duke of Croatia, 821–c. 835
- Ivan Vladislav, emperor of Bulgaria 1015–1018
- Vladislaus I, duke of Bohemia 1109–1117, 1120–1125
- Vladislaus II (c. 1110–1174), duke and later king of Bohemia 1158–1172
- Vladislaus III, duke of Bohemia, 1197; prince of Bohemia and margrave of Moravia, 1197–1222
- Stefan Vladislav I, king of Serbia 1234–1243
- Stefan Vladislav II (reigned 1316 to 1325), king of Syrmia
- Vladislav of Bosnia, ruler of Banate of Bosnia, died 1354
- Vladislav I, ruler of Wallachia 1364–c. 1377
- Władysław II Jagiełło (d. 1434), grand duke of Lithuania and king of Poland 1386–1434
- Vladislav II, ruler of Wallachia 1447–1456
- Vladislaus II of Hungary, king of Bohemia 1471–1516, king of Hungary and Croatia 1490–1516
- Vladislav I Herman of Poland, duke of Poland
- Vladislav the Grammarian (fl. 1456–1479), Bulgarian writer
- Vladislav III of Wallachia (died 1525), ruler of Wallachia
- Vladislav IV of Russia (reigned 1595–1648), king of Poland, grand duke of Lithuania and titular king of Sweden

=== Given name ===
- František Vladislav Hek (1769–1847), Czech national revivalist
- Władysław Horodecki (1863–1930), Polish architect
- Vladislav Artemiev (born 1998), Russian Chess Grandmaster
- Vladislav Bajac (born 1954), Serbian writer, journalist, and publisher
- Vladislav Bogićević (born 1950), Serbian footballer
- Vladislav Bykanov (born 1989), Israeli Olympic short track speed skater
- Vladislav Dajković (born 1992), Montenegrin political and activist
- Vladislav Dikidzhi (born 2004), Russian figure slater
- Vladislav Jovanović (born 1933), Serbian diplomat
- Vladislav Khodasevich (1886–1939), Russian poet
- Vladislav Krapivin (1938–2020), Russian writer
- Vladislav Kulminski (born 1972), Moldovan politician
- Vladislav Listyev, Russian journalist and head of the ORT TV Channel (now government-owned Channel One)
- Vladislav Petković Dis (1880–1917), Serbian impressionist poet
- Vladislav F. Ribnikar (1871–1914), Serbian journalist, founder of Politika
- Vladislav Roslyakov (2000–2018), Russian mass murderer and perpetrator of the 2018 Kerch Polytechnic College massacre
- Vladislav Sitnichenko (born 1998), Russian footballer
- Vladislav Tretiak (born 1952), Russian ice hockey goaltender
- Vladislav Vančura (1891–1942), Czech writer, playwright and film director
- Vladyslav Vashchuk (born 1975), Ukrainian footballer

== See also ==
- Ladislao, Ladislas, Ladislaus, Ladislav, László, Vladislav/Vladislava/Vladek, Vladyslav/Volodyslav, Władysław/Władek
