= Włodzisław, Duke of Lendians =

Włodzisław, Władysław

Duke of Lendians
- Died: after 944/945

Włodzisław or Władysław (date of birth unknown – died after 944/945) was a Duke of Lendians.

== Life ==
As ruler of Lendians, he paid tribute to Kievan Rus', which is confirmed by archaeological studies and biography of Constantine VII Porphyrogennetos. As evidenced by Nestor Chronicle, Volodislav (Володислав) sent his emissary Uleb to Constantinople in 944/945, when talks on peace between Igor of Kiev and Byzantine emperors, Romanos I Lekapenos and Constantine VII, took place.
