= Władysław Żeleński =

Władysław Żeleński may refer to:

- Władysław Żeleński (composer) (1837–1921), Polish composer, pianist and organist
- Władysław Żeleński (lawyer) (1903–2006), Polish lawyer, historian, publicist
