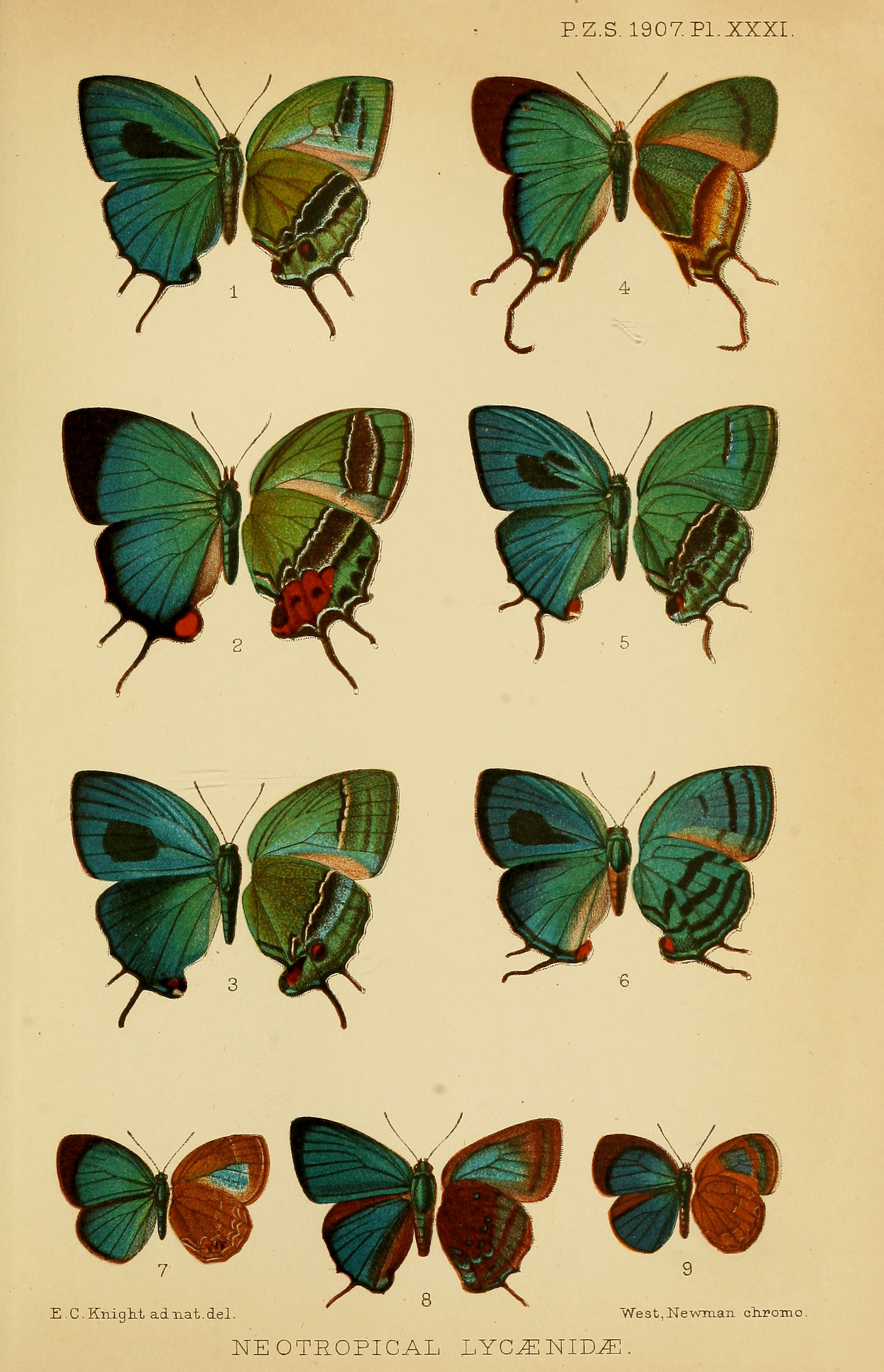
- Figure 7

Scientific classification
- Domain: Eukaryota
- Kingdom: Animalia
- Phylum: Arthropoda
- Class: Insecta
- Order: Lepidoptera
- Family: Lycaenidae
- Tribe: Eumaeini
- Genus: Timaeta; Johnson, Kruse & Kroenlein, 1997

Synonyms
- Jagiello Bálint & Wojtusiak, 2000; Trochusinus K.Johnson, Salazar & Vélez, 1997

= Timaeta =

Butterfly genus in family Lycaenidae

Timaeta is a genus of butterflies in the family Lycaenidae. The species of this genus are found in the Neotropical realm.

== Species ==
- Timaeta aepea (Hewitson, 1874)
- Timaeta balzabamba (Goodson, 1945)
- Timaeta christina Robbins & Busby, 2008
- Timaeta cospata Robbins & Busby, 2008
- Timaeta eronos (Druce, 1890)
- Timaeta gabriela Busby & Robbins, 2008
- Timaeta matthewi Busby & Robbins, 2008
- Timaeta molinopampa (Bálint & Wojtusiak, 2000)
- Timaeta pilosa Robbins & Busby, 2008
- Timaeta roberti Busby & Robbins, 2008
- Timaeta romero Robbins & Busby, 2008
- Timaeta timaeus (C. & R.Felder, 1865)
- Timaeta trochus (Druce, 1907)
- Timaeta walkeri Robbins & Busby, 2008
- Timaeta werneri (Salazar, Vélez, Cardona & Johnson, 1997)
