= Ladislaus of Hungary =

Ladislaus of Hungary may refer to:

- Ladislaus the Bald (before 997–before 1030), Duke of Nyitra c. 977–995 (debated), 997–1030 (debated)
- Ladislaus I of Hungary (c. 1040–1095), reigned 1077–1095
- Ladislaus II of Hungary (1131–1163), reigned 1162–1163
- Ladislaus III of Hungary (c. 1200–1205), reigned 1204–1205
- Ladislaus IV of Hungary (1262–1290), reigned 1272–1290
- Wenceslaus III of Bohemia (1289–1306), King of Hungary 1301–1305 (nominal); also King of Bohemia and King of Poland
- Ladislaus the Posthumous (1440–1457), King of Hungary and Croatia 1440–1457; also King of Bohemia and Duke of Austria
