= František Čelakovský =

Czech poet

František Ladislav Čelakovský
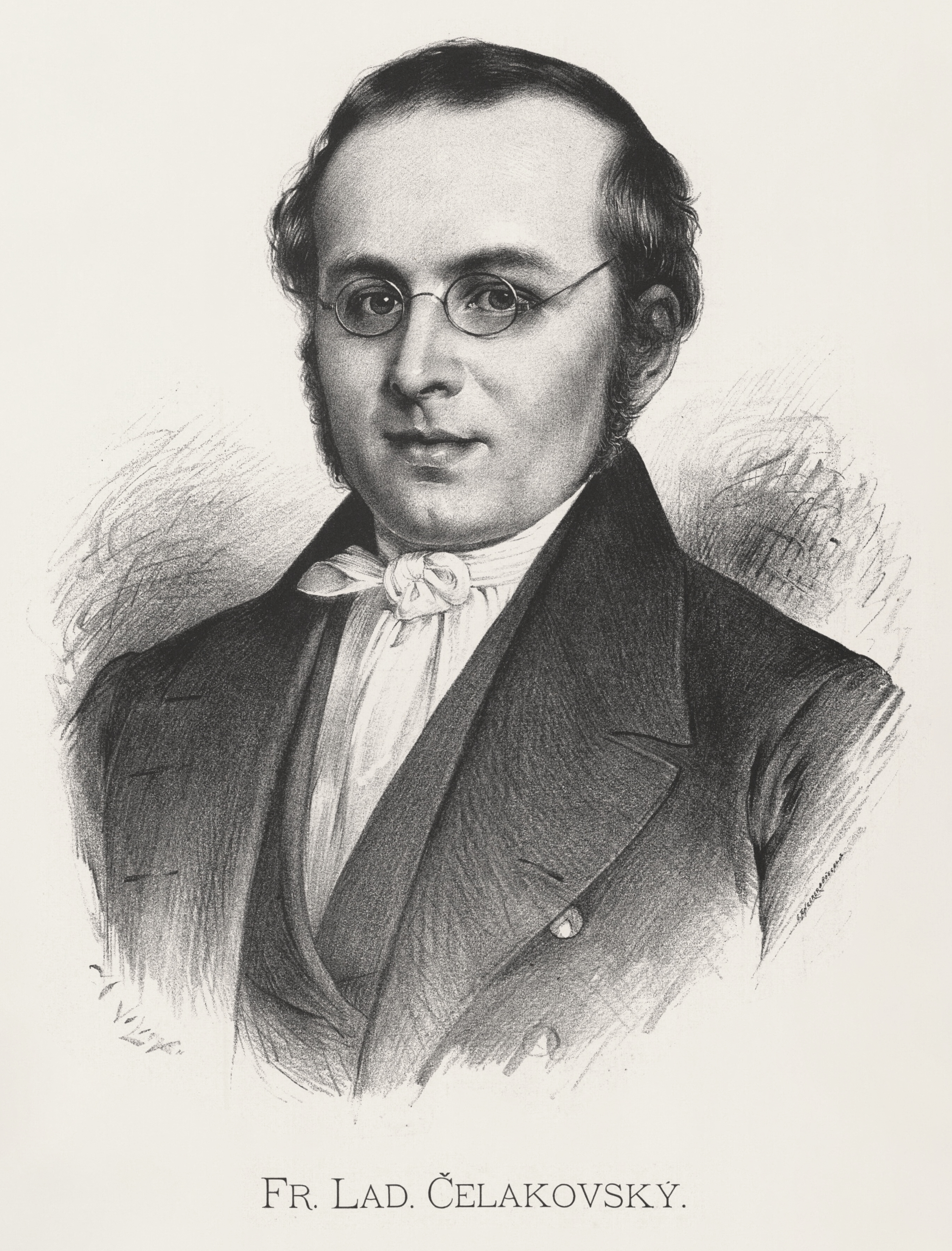
- Portrait of Čelakovský by Jan Vilímek
- Born: 7 March 1799; Strakonice, Bohemia, Habsburg monarchy
- Died: 5 August 1852 (aged 53); Prague, Bohemia, Austrian Empire
- Resting place: Olšany Cemetery
- Occupation: Poet
- Spouse: Bohuslava Rajská
- Children: Ladislav Josef Čelakovský; Jaromír Čelakovský; Marie Čelakovská
- Writing career
- Pen name: Marcian Hromotluk
- Genre: Sentimentalism
- Notable works: Ohlas písní ruských Ohlas písní českých

František Ladislav Čelakovský (7 March 1799 – 5 August 1852) was a Czech poet, translator, linguist and literary critic. He was a major figure in the Czech National Revival. His most notable works are Ohlas písní ruských (Echoes of Russian Songs) and Ohlas písní českých (Echoes of Bohemian Songs).

== Life ==
Čelakovský was born in Strakonice to the carpenter Vojtěch Čelakovský and his wife Anna. He attended high school in České Budějovice and then Písek. He began studying philosophy in Prague, but due to financial problems transferred to a lyceum in České Budějovice was expelled for reading Jan Hus. He continued his studies in Linz and then at Charles University in Prague (then called Charles-Ferdinand University). Rather than focus on the required courses, he took language and literature courses for self-study. He failed a logic exam in 1822 and never got a university degree.

Čelakovský made a living as a private tutor until 1829.Thanks to Karel Alois Vinařický's recommendation, Prague's archbishop had him translate Augustine of Hippo's De Civitate Dei. From 1829 to 1842 he was a proofreader for the Časopis pro katolické duchovenstvo (Magazine for the Catholic Clergy). From 1833, Čelakovský was an editor of Pražské noviny, a newspaper in Prague. As editor, he attempted to develop readers' political and cultural knowledge. He expanded the magazine Česká Wčela (The Czech Bee), had the newspaper include articles from foreign non-German-language press for the first time, and developed relationships with Slavists abroad. In 1835, he was named a professor of Czech language and literature in Prague.

On 26 November 1835, Čelakovský commented negatively in Pražské noviny about Russian Tsar Nicholas I's threats against a Polish uprising. The Russian embassy in Vienna complained and Čelakovský was removed from his position as both an editor and professor. For the next two years, he survived only through translations and the support of Karel Alois Vinařický. From 1838, he was a librarian for the Kinsky family. In 1841, he became a professor of Slavic Literature in Wrocław, and then got the same position in Prague in 1849.

== Family ==
František Ladislav Čelakovský married Marie Ventová in Strakonice on 2 February 1834. They had four children together, before she died from typhus in 1844. The next year, he married Antonie Reissová in Prague. Antonie kept a correspondence with author Božena Němcová, which Čelakovský occasionally took part in. They had four children together, but one, Anna, died three months after she was born. Antonie died in 1852, and Čelakovský died in Prague later that year, on 5 August 1852. In his will, Čelakovský made Dr. Josef František Frič the guardian of his children. Čelakovský's granddaughter Marie Tůmová, daughter of Marie, was a teacher and a women's suffragist.

== Works ==
Čelakovský's style is often classified as pre-romanticism. He both influenced and was influenced by other leaders of the Czech National Revival, as well as foreign Slavic cultural figures.

Between 1821 and 1823 he published several poems under the name Žofie Jandová, a woman's name. As a female poet, she was intended to show the high level of development of Czech literature and culture. The English translator John Bowring included her in his anthology of Czech literature. Čelakovský also occasionally used the pseudonym Marcián Hromotluk.

Čelakovský's most important works were either collections of Slavic folklore or poems based on Slavic folklore.

His Slovanské národní písně (National Songs of the Slavs) is an important collection of Slavic folk songs. Part 1 (1822) is a collection of Bohemian, Moravian, and Slovak folk songs, dedicated to Václav Hanka. Part 2 (1825), dedicated to Kazimierz Brodziński, is divided into two books. The first continues to cover Bohemian, Moravian, and Slovak folk songs. The second is folk songs from other Slavic languages, with the originals appearing next to Čelakovský's Czech translations. Čelakovský published songs that did not make it into the first two parts in the originally unplanned Part 3 (1827), dedicated to Vuk Karadžić.

Ohlas písní ruských (Echoes of Russian Songs) (1829) is a collection of epic poems based on themes from Russian folklore, especially byliny.

Ohlas písní českých (Echoes of Bohemian Songs) (1839) is a similar collection of poems based on themes from Czech life. However, rather than focusing on epic or heroic themes like Echoes of Russian Songs, most of the poems are in much simpler language, with proverb-like lines about daily life.

Mudrosloví národa slovanského v příslovích (The Wisdom of the Slavic People in Proverbs) (1852) is a collection of Slavic proverbs, arranged thematically to portray the traditional life philosophy of the Slavs.

In addition to poetry and works related to Slavic folklore, Čelakovský also published translations from German, English, and Latin into Czech, scientific literature on Slavic linguistics, and textbooks on the Czech language.
