= Eugeniusz Jagiełło =

Polish politician (1873–1947)

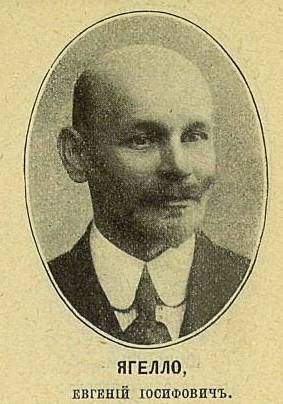
Eugeniusz Jagiełło

Eugeniusz Jagiełło (Polish pronunciation: [ɛwˈɡɛɲuʂ jaˈɡʲɛwwɔ]; in official Russian documents Евге́ний Ио́сифович Яге́лло; 1873 in Warsaw – 1947 in Warsaw) was a Polish socialist politician, a member of the Polish Socialist Party – Left, elected deputy to the Fourth Duma from the city of Warsaw. The elections to the Warsaw electoral college had been won by Jewish parties, whom mustered 46 electoral votes whilst the non-Jewish bloc gathered 34. However the Jewish bloc decided to elect a Polish Duma member, in an attempt not to inflame antisemitic feelings towards the Jewish community. Initially the Jewish bloc had approached Kucharzewski, but he declined the nomination. Thus the Jewish bloc had turned to Jagiełło, electing him as the deputy from Warsaw.

Once in the Duma, the Bolsheviks strongly objected to his admission to the Social-Democratic group because he was elected with the support of the bourgeoisie and the electoral bloc consisting of the Polish Socialist Party – Left and the Jewish Bund. Under the pressure of Bolshevik deputies his rights in the group were restricted: on all internal Party matters he had voice but no vote.
