= Ladislaus IV =

Ladislaus IV may refer to:

- Ladislaus IV of Hungary (1262–1290), a king of Hungary
- Władysław I Łokietek (1260/1261-1333), King of Poland who was sometimes numbered IV
- Władysław IV Vasa or Ladislaus IV (1595–1648), a king of Poland
