= Ladislaus I =

Ladislaus I (also spelled Vladislav I or Władysław I) may refer to:

- Ladislaus I of Hungary (1040–1095), King of Hungary
- Ladislaus I Herman (1040–1102), Duke of Poland
- Vladislaus I, Duke of Bohemia (c. 1065–1125), Duke of Bohemia
- Władysław II the Exile (1105–1159), Duke of Silesia, sometimes known as Ladislaus I the Exile
- Vladislaus II, Duke of Bohemia (c. 1110–1174), who reigned as King Vladislaus I of Bohemia
- Vladislav I of Serbia, King of Serbia (1234–1243)
- Ladislaus I of Opole (1246–1281), Duke of Opole
- Wladislaus I of Oswiecim (c. 1314 – c. 1321), Duke of Oświęcim
- Władysław I the Elbow-high (1261–1333), King of Poland (also known as Ladislaus the Short, or Władysław I Łokietek)
- Vladislav I of Wallachia (died 1377), Prince of Wallachia (also known as Vlaicu-Vodă)
- Ladislaus I Losonci (died 1392), Hungarian baron
- Ladislaus I of Naples (1377–1411), King of Naples

== See also ==
- Ladislaus (disambiguation)
- Ladislaus I of Poland (disambiguation)
