= Władysław Kowalski =

Władysław Kowalski may refer to:

- Władysław Kowalski (politician) (1894–1958), Polish politician
- Władysław Kowalski (actor) (1936–2017), Polish actor
- Władysław Kowalski (footballer) (1897–1939), Polish footballer, played for Wisła Kraków
