= Ladislaus Kán (disambiguation) =

Ladislaus Kán (Hungarian: Kán László; Romanian: Ladislau Kán) may refer to:

- Ladislaus I Kán (d. after 1247)
- Ladislaus II Kán (d. 1278)
- Ladislaus III Kán (d. 1315)
- Ladislaus IV Kán
