= László Hetey =

Hungarian actor and puppeteer (1942–2025)

László Hetey (12 February 1942 – August 2025) was a Hungarian actor and puppeteer.

== Life and work ==
Hetey was born in Nyíregyháza on 12 February 1942. He completed a puppeteer training course in 1965. Between 1963 and 1983 he was a member of the State Puppet Theatre. From 1983 he was an actor at the Móricz Zsigmond Theatre in Nyíregyháza.

He primarily worked in the theatre, however, he also appeared in the television series Kisváros.

Hetey died in August 2025, at the age of 83.
