= Michał Jagiełło =

Polish swimmer

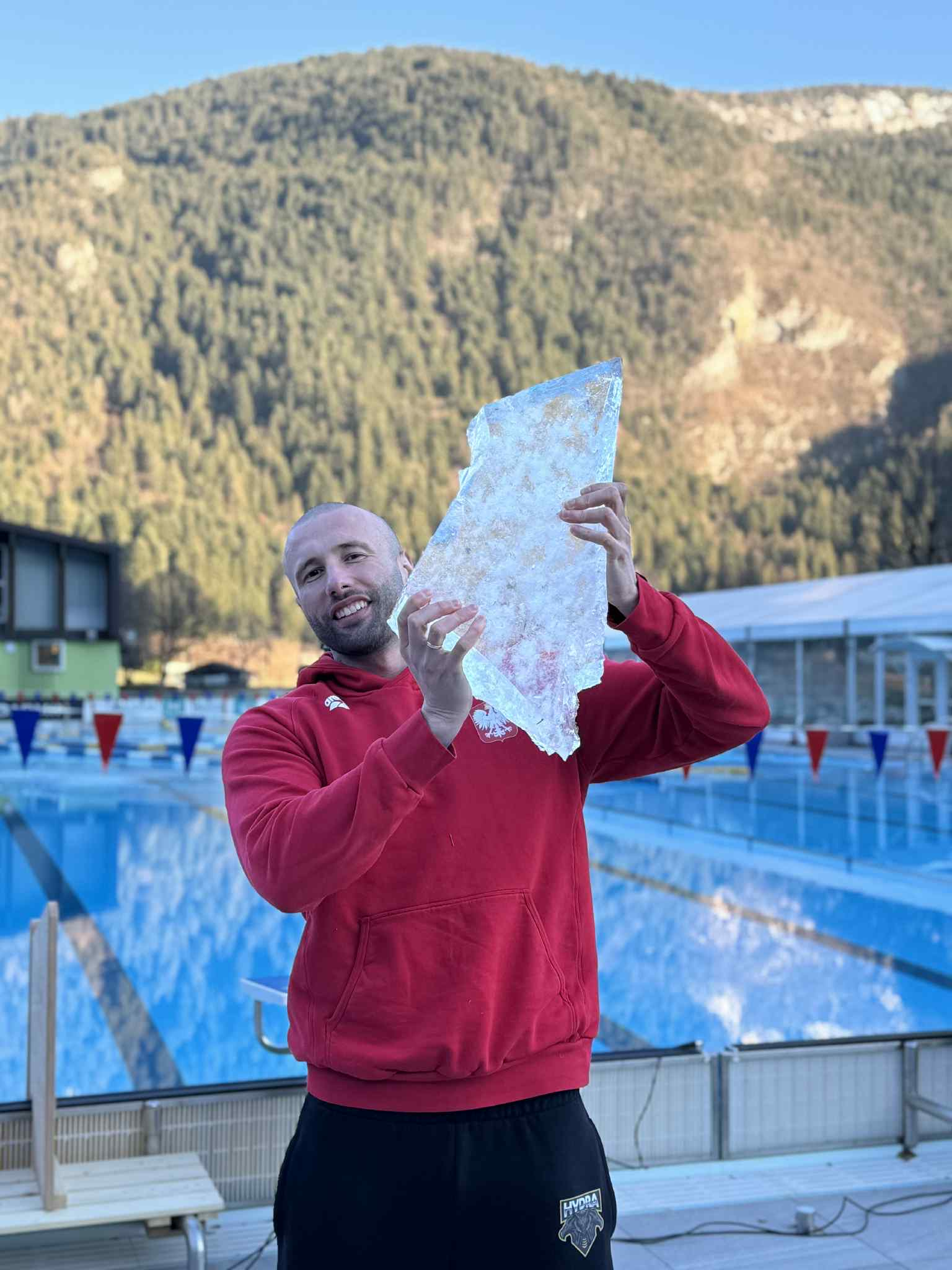
- Michał Jagiełło at IISA World Championship 2025 Molveno

Personal information
- Born: February 15, 1990 (age 36)< Biała Podlaska

Sport
- Country: Poland
- Sport: Swimming
- Strokes: winter, Freestyle, Butterfly

Michał Jagiełło (born 15 February 1990 in Biała Podlaska, Poland) is a Polish swimmer specializing in sprint events in ice and winter swimming. He is a multiple medalist of World, European, and Polish Championships, a World record holder, and a Guinness World Record holder. He has participated in extreme sports competitions, including under-ice swimming.

== Guinness World Record ==
In 2025, during the International Ice Swimming Association (IISA) World Championships in Molveno, Michał Jagiełło, as a member of the Polish national mixed 4×50 m freestyle relay team, contributed to setting a Guinness World Record with a time of 1:52.55.

== World Championships ==
- 2022, Głogów – Triple World Champion (50 m butterfly, 50 m freestyle, and 100 m freestyle).
- 2023, Tallinn – World Champion and World Vice-Champion in various sprint events (25 m freestyle, 25 m butterfly, 100 m freestyle).
- 2025, Molveno – Age Category World Champion and Age Category World Record holder (50 m freestyle), World Vice-Champion, and Bronze Medalist.

== European Championships ==
- 2024, Oradea – Age Category European Champion (50 m freestyle), European Vice-Champion with a world record, and European Champion in the mixed relay.

== Polish Championships and Masters ==
- 2017, Warsaw – Polish Masters Champion in the 50 m freestyle.

== Coaching career ==
Michał Jagiełło also works as a swimming coach. He conducts individual and group training sessions for children, including those with motor impairments, as well as for adults and athletes. He specializes in sprint technique, preparation for cold-water competitions, and therapeutic water-based training.
