= Vladislav Sitnichenko =

Russian footballer

Personal information
- Full name: Vladislav Dmitriyevich Sitnichenko
- Date of birth: 12 February 1998 (age 28)
- Place of birth: Irkutsk, Russia
- Height: 1.64 m (5 ft 4 1/2 in)
- Position: Midfielder

Senior career*
Years	Team	Apps	(Gls)
2016	Baikal Irkutsk	4	(0)
- * Club domestic league appearances and goals

Vladislav Dmitriyevich Sitnichenko (Russian: Владислав Дмитриевич Ситниченко; born 12 February 1998) is a Russian former football player.

He made his debut in the Russian Football National League for Baikal Irkutsk on 12 March 2016 in a game against Yenisey Krasnoyarsk.
