= Ladislaus III =

Ladislaus III (also spelled as Vladislav III or Władysław III) may refer to:

- Ladislaus III of Hungary (1201–1205), Arpad king
- Władysław III Spindleshanks (1165–1231), Duke of Poland
- Władysław III of Poland (1424–1444), also king of Hungary, known posthumously as Ladislaus of Varna
- Vladislaus II of Bohemia and Hungary (1456–1516), Jagiellon ruler who was sometimes referred to as Vladislav III of Bohemia
- Vladislav III of Wallachia, Prince of Wallachia (d. 1525)
- Vladislaus III, Duke of Bohemia, (1160–1222)

== See also ==
- Władysław III of Poland (disambiguation)
- Ladislaus (disambiguation)
