= Vladyslav =

Male given name

Vladyslav (Ukrainian: Владисла́в [u̯lɐdɪˈslɑu̯]) or Volodyslav (Ukrainian: Володисла́в [wolodɪˈslɑu̯]) is a Ukrainian male given name. The female variant is the same with the addition of 'a' at the end.

The name is of old Slavic origin and has many cogbantes.

== See also ==
- Ladislao, Ladislas, Ladislaus, Ladislav, László, Vladislav/Vladislava, Vladyslav/Volodyslav, Władysław
