= Ladislas =

Ladislas is a Slavic masculine given name, similar to Ladislav or Ladislaus. Ladislas and Ladislaus can be Latinizations of the Hungarian name László or the Polish name Władysław. Notable people with the name include:

- Ladislas Bushiri, Congolese-Canadian soccer player
- Ladislas Dormandi (1898–1967), Hungarian-born French writer
- Ladislas Douniama, Congolese footballer
- Ladislas Farago (1906–1980), Hungarian-American military historian and journalist
- Ladislas Fodor (1898–1978), Hungarian playwright and screenwriter
- Ladislas Goldstein
- Ladislas Ignace de Bercheny, Hungarian-born soldier and Marshal of France
- Ladislas J. Meduna (1896-1964), Psychiatrist and neuropathologist
- Ladislas Jonart, French cleric, bishop, and archbishop
- Ladislas Kijno (1921–2012), French painter
- Ladislas Lazaro (1872–1927), American politician
- Ladislas Lozano (born 1952), Football player and manager
- Ladislas Medgyes, Hungarian artist
- Ladislas Ntaganzwa (born 1962), Rwandan war criminal
- Ladislas Orsy (1921–2025), Hungarian-American Jesuit theologian
- Ladislas Poniatowski, French politician
- Ladislas Segoe, American urban planner
- Ladislas Smid (1915-1990), Hungarian-born French footballer
- Ladislas Starevich (1882–1965), Polish-Russian stop-motion animator
- Ladislas Starevich (1882–1965), Polish-Russian stop-motion animator
- Ladislas Starevich (1882–1965), Polish-Russian stop-motion animator
- Ladislas the Bald (c. 997–1030), Member of the House of Árpád

== See also ==
- Ladislao, Ladislas, Ladislaus, Ladislav, László, Vladislav/Vladislava, Vladyslav/Volodyslav, Władysław
