= Ladislav Josef Čelakovský =

Czech botanist

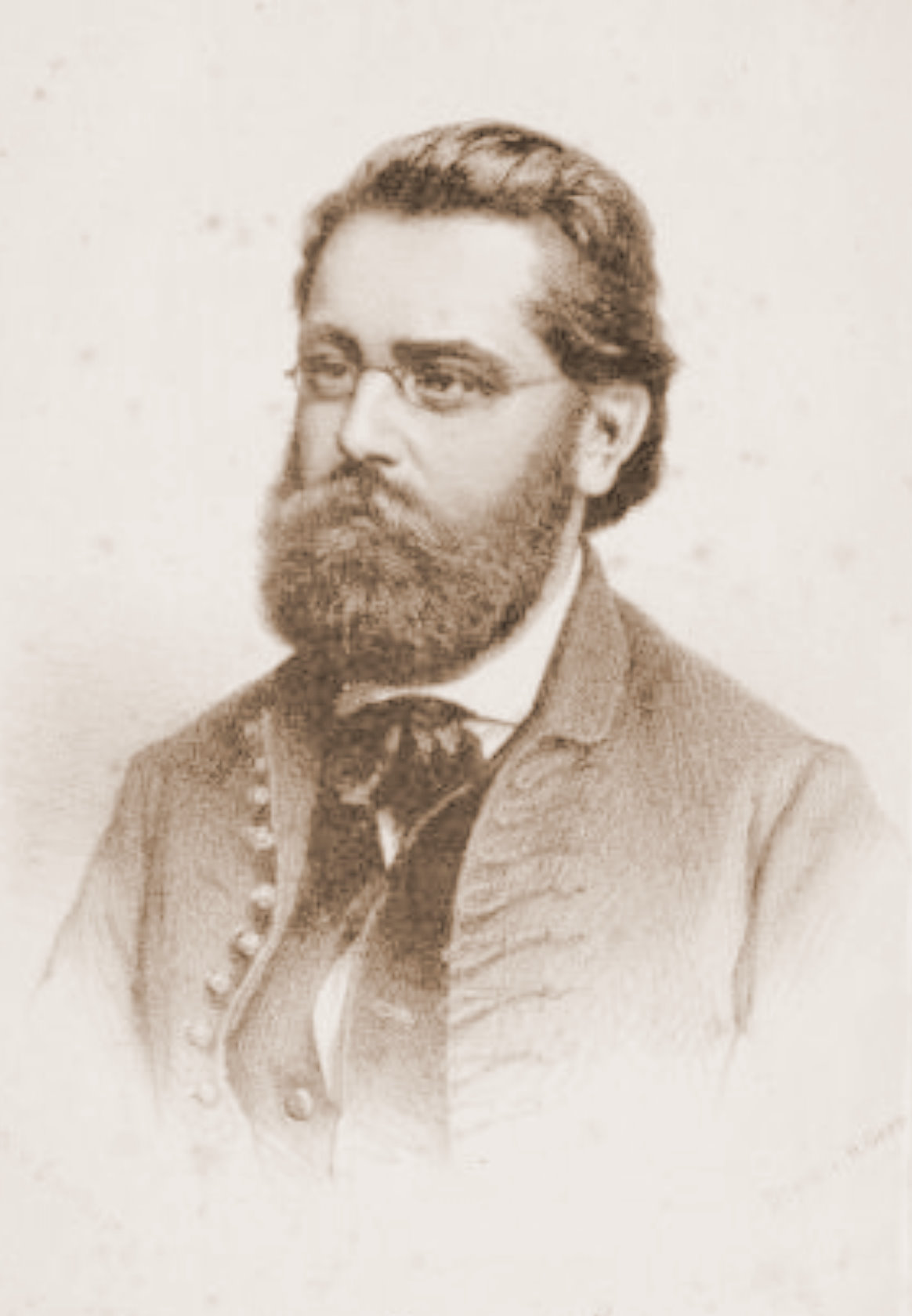
Ladislav Čelakovský

Ladislav Josef Čelakovský (29 November 1834 – 24 November 1902) was a Czech botanist. He was the son of writer František Ladislav Čelakovský, and father to mycologist Ladislav František Čelakovský (1864–1916). He took an evolutionary approach to the study of plants, alternation of generation, flower structure and other aspects.

== Life and work ==
Čelakovský was born in Prague on 29 November 1834. He studied at Charles University in Prague, and from 1860 gave lectures at the National Museum in Prague. In 1880 he attained the chair of botany at the university. In 1877 he became a member of the Königliche Böhmische Gesellschaft der Wissenschaften (Czech Royal Society of Sciences).

Čelakovský conducted extensive research involving classification of plants, particularly studies of regional flora from what is now the Czech Republic. Čelakovský was a supporter of Darwinism and took an evolutionary approach to his studies. He made important contributions on the morphology and physiology of the reproductive organs of Gymnospermae. Other major works included On the General Evolution of the Vegetable Kingdom (1868), On the Different Forms and the Meaning of the Alternation of Generations in Plants (1874), The Law of Reduction in Flowers (1894), The Evolution of the Flower (1896 and 1900) and On the Relationship between the Different Methods of Morphological Research (1874). He described numerous new plant species, and a handful of plants are named after him including Stipa celakovskyi, Lathyrus celakovskyi and Orchis celakovskyi.

== Selected publications ==
- Analytická květena Čech, Moravy a rakouského Slezska (Analysis of flora of Bohemia, Moravia and Austrian Silesia), Prague 1879, 1897.
- Prodromus květeny české (Prodromus of Czech flora), Prague 1868–1889.
- Přírodopisný atlas rostlinstva (Natural historical atlas of vegetation), Prague 1866, 1873 and 1889.
- Rozpravy o Darwinově theorii (Debates on Darwin's theory), Prague 1894.
