= Ladislav František Čelakovský =

Czech mycologist and botanist

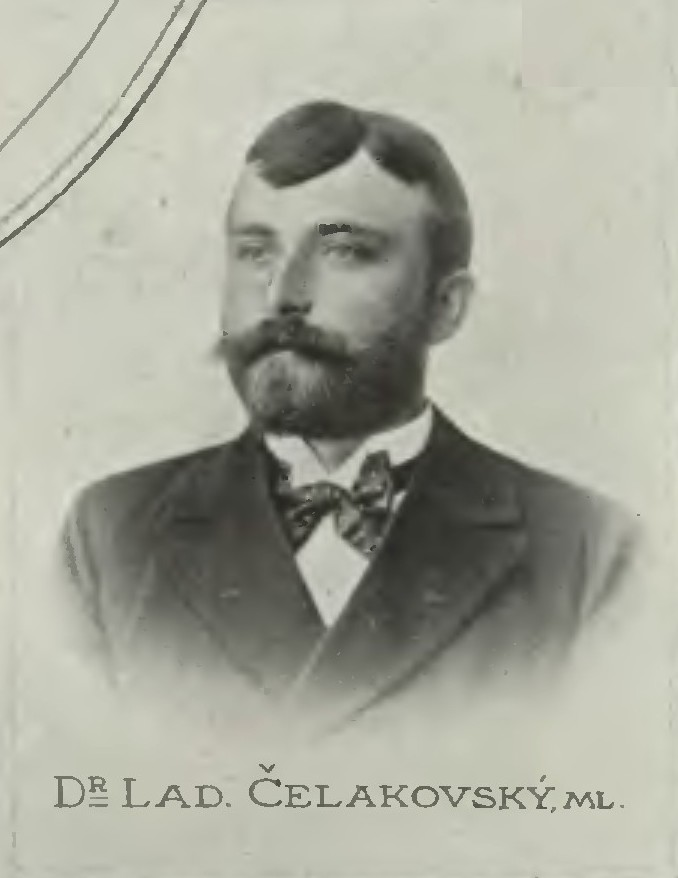

Ladislav František Čelakovský (3 December 1863 – 31 December 1916) was a Czech mycologist and botanist.

== Biography ==
Born in Prague, he was the son of botanist Ladislav Josef Čelakovský (1834–1902). Čelakovský was a professor of plant physiology at the Czech Technical University in Prague, and was a specialist in research of slime molds. He was the author of an 1890 book on the phylum Myxomycota called České myxomycety.
