= Ladislaus II =

Ladislaus II (also spelled Vladislav II or Władysław II) may refer to:

- Władysław II the Exile (1105–1159), Duke of Poland and Silesia
- Ladislaus II of Hungary (1131–1163), king of Hungary from 1162 to 1163
- Vladislaus II of Bohemia (died 1174), second king of Bohemia
- Vladislav II of Serbia (c. 1280–1325), Serbian monarch
- Władysław II of Opole (c. 1332–1401), Duke of Opole
- Wladyslaw II Jagiello, a.k.a. Jogaila (1351–1434), Grand Duke of Lithuania and King of Poland
- Vladislaus II of Bohemia and Hungary (1456–1516), King of Bohemia and King of Hungary
- Vladislav II of Wallachia, Prince of Wallachia (d. 1456)

== See also ==
- Ladislaus (disambiguation)
- Ladislaus Jagiello (disambiguation)
