= Ladislaus =

Ladislaus is a masculine given name of Slavic origin.

It may refer to:

- Ladislaus I (disambiguation)
- Ladislaus II (disambiguation)
- Ladislaus III (disambiguation)
- Ladislaus IV (disambiguation)
- Ladislaus Jagiello (disambiguation)
- Ladislaus Kán (disambiguation)
- Ladislaus of Hungary (disambiguation)
- Ladislaus Aba (fl. 1280–1299), Hungarian cleric
- Ladislaus (bishop of Vác) (r. 1289–1293), Hungarian prelate
- Wenceslaus III of Bohemia (1289–1306), who took the name Ladislaus when he was crowned King of Hungary in 1301
- Ladislaus Nevnai (died after 1324), Hungarian nobleman and landowner
- Ladislaus Rátót (died 1328), Hungarian nobleman and landowner
- Ladislaus Baksa (died 1429 or 1430), Hungarian nobleman and landowner
- Ladislaus Jánki (died 1336 or 1337), Hungarian prelate
- Ladislaus Csetneki (c. 1373–1450), Hungarian prelate
- Ladislaus of Naples (1377–1414), King of Naples
- Ladislaus Szécsényi (1413–1460), Hungarian nobleman and landowner
- Ladislaus Hunyadi (1431–1457), Hungarian nobleman
- Ladislaus the Posthumous or Ladislaus V of Hungary (1440–1457), also King of Bohemia
- Ladislaus Sunthaym (c. 1440–1512 or 1513), German historian, genealogist and geographer
- Ladislaus Szalkai (died 1526), Hungarian prelate
- Ladislaus Pyrker (1772–1847), Hungarian Cistercian abbot, archbishop and poet
- Ladislaus Bortkiewicz (1868–1931), Russian economist and statistician
- Ladislaus Vajda (1877–1933), Hungarian screenwriter
- Ladislaus Kurpiel (1883–1930), Austrian footballer
- Ladislaus Perera Ranasinghe (1913-1983), Sri Lankan Sinhala actor

== See also ==
- Ladislao, Ladislas, Ladislaus, Ladislav, László, Vladislav/Vladislava, Vladyslav/Volodyslav, Władysław
