= Fidesz propaganda =

Communication of Hungary's governing party from 2010 until 2026

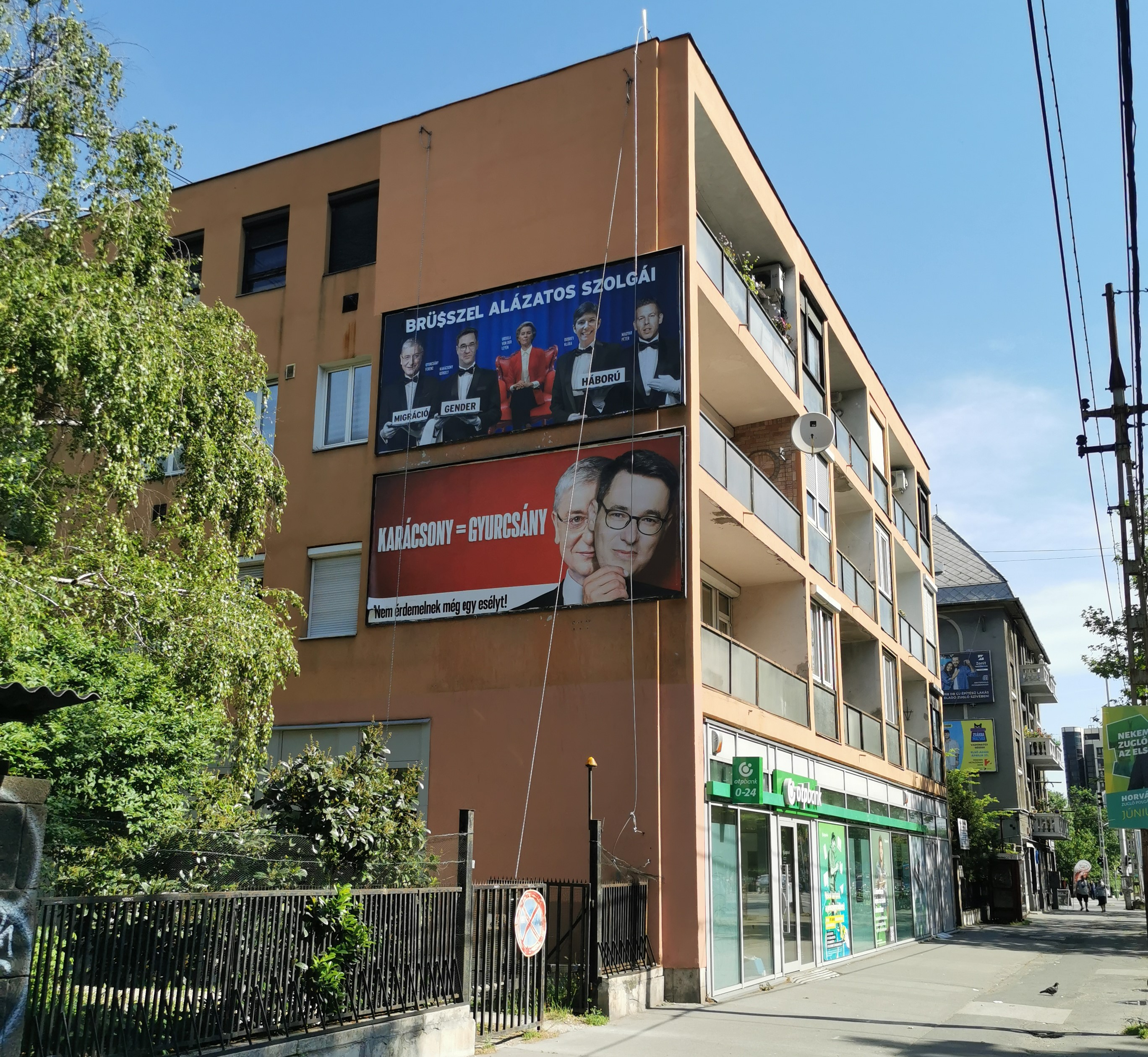
The top poster titled "Bru$sels's humble servants", depicts opposition politicians Gyurcsány, Karácsony, Dobrev, and Magyar as butlers of Ursula von der Leyen, offering migration, gender, and war. The bottom one equalizes Karácsony and Gyurcsány, stating "They don't deserve another chance!"

The communication of Fidesz, Hungary's governing party between 2010 and 2026, led by Prime Minister Viktor Orbán, has been widely described as populist propaganda.

Since Fidesz–KDNP's 2010 landslide victory, government-critical media was removed one-by-one through legal and financial means, while oligarchs close to the government acquired outlets. Hungary's public service broadcaster and other television channels and radio stations were united under the Media Services Support and Asset Management Fund (MTVA). Meanwhile, 80% of all Hungarian media is operated by the Central European Press and Media Foundation (KESMA), filled with Fidesz loyalists. The media policy of the Orbán regime was based on limiting access to financial resources, undermining the independence of regulatory bodies, and hindering access to information of public interest. As a result, Hungary experiences two parallel media systems: one directly or indirectly controlled by the government, and the other being independent. Paid for by taxpayer money, Fidesz uses bought-up outlets, its social media empire, and outdoor advertising to spread manipulative and hostile disinformation.

During the 2015 European migrant crisis, a smear campaign was launched by Fidesz against George Soros, and his alleged "Soros Plan" of uncontrolled migration. Billboards nationwide claimed that he wanted to settle millions of Africans and Middle Easterners in Hungary. Meanwhile, the Orbán regime portrayed itself as the ones who are defending Hungary's national interests. Migrants were depicted as terrorists who spread lethal diseases, threaten local culture, and rape women. This campaign led to the 2016 migrant quota referendum, the 2017 National Consultation (Note: National Consultation surveys – not to be confused with legally binding referendums – were postal ballots of citizen consultation sent to all voters, introduced by Fidesz in 2005. They have been used as a manipulating propaganda tool, often including leading questions, weasel words, false dilemmas, and disinformation. Available answer options were in line with the government's messages, and government communication later used these as reference to the popular will. Later National Consultations were paid for by billions of forints of taxpayer money.) about the alleged "Soros Plan", and the 2018 Stop Soros laws. The "weak West", the EU, the UN, and "the globalists" were accused of orchestrating a population exchange, and were later blamed for exposing children to woke ideology, the promotion of homosexuality, and dangerous sex-change surgeries. In 2021, the anti-LGBTQ law was enacted, a referendum was held next year about "sexual propaganda" in schools, and Pride parades were banned in 2025.

Following the Russian invasion of Ukraine, Fidesz's communication falsely accused the opposition, Brussels, European countries, and NATO members of dragging Hungary into war by seeking to send weapons and soldiers to Ukraine. Painting Ukraine as the source of danger instead of Russia, Fidesz claimed that the opposition conspired with Volodymyr Zelenskyy to interfere with Hungarian elections. The regime's rhetoric divided Hungarians into peace-lovers and warmongers, and oppositional figures and organizations were labelled "pro-war". The 2024 and 2026 elections were portrayed as a choice between World War III and peace. Numerous Russian-style hostile smear campaigns were launched against Péter Magyar, then leader of the largest party and Orbán's main rival, who was later elected prime minister. His Tisza Party was accused of increasing taxes, and accounts and organizations close to Fidesz released AI-generated videos discrediting him.

== Centralization of the press ==
The government's communication was not clear enough. We should have spent more time and money on this in places that were not part of the dominant liberal media. We should have created more space in the printed press, the electronic media and so forth. We should have opened up more channels of communication, which is not just a media question. It was good to set up Heti Válasz, but we should have started more newspapers. We missed that chance.

— Viktor Orbán, after their 2002 election defeat

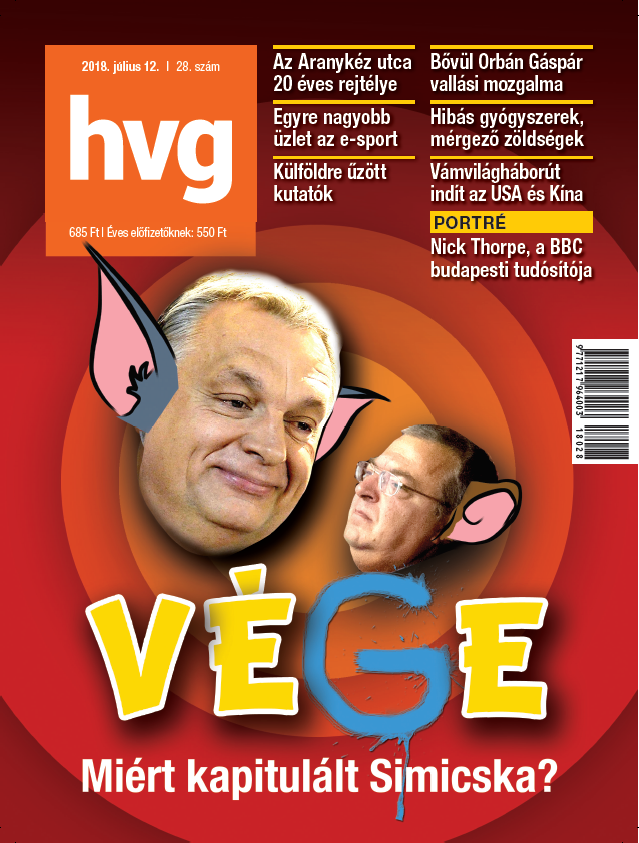
Cover page of HVG's 2018 issue, depicting Simicska's (right) capitulation to Orbán (left). The "G" refers to the insult of Orbán said by Simicska.

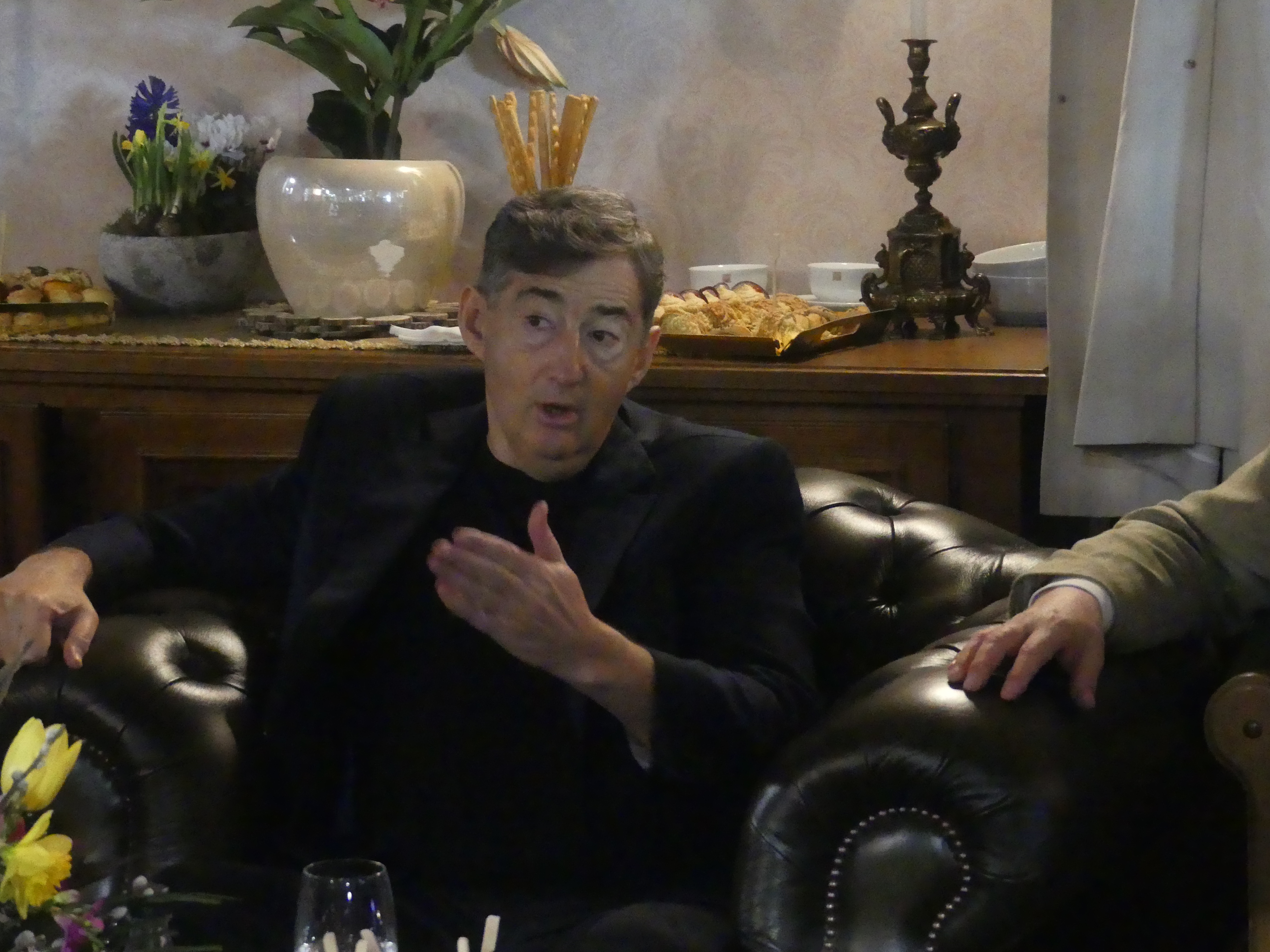
Lőrinc Mészáros, former plumber and Orbán's childhood friend, took over Simicska's role, and became the richest Hungarian. He owns Mediaworks Hungary, which controls KESMA officially since 2019.

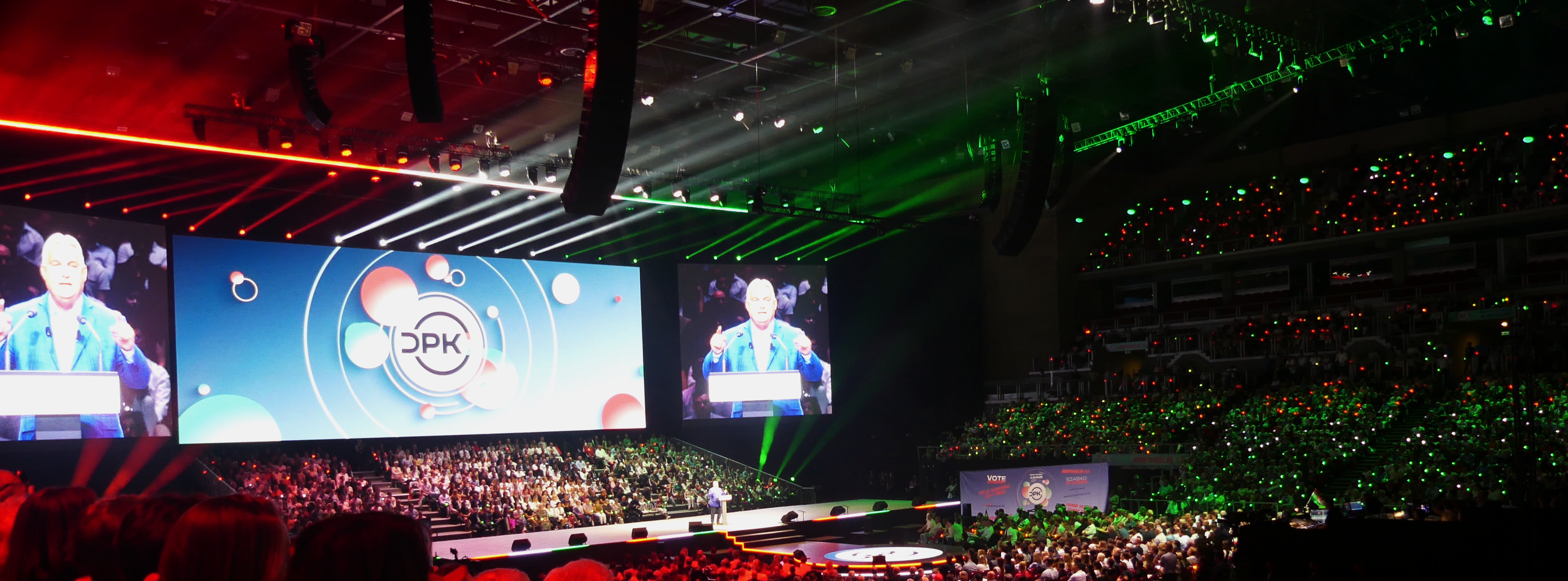
First National Meeting of the Digital Civil Circles in September 2025. Digital Civic Circles were established for Fidesz supporters, but were unable to produce any meaningful results.

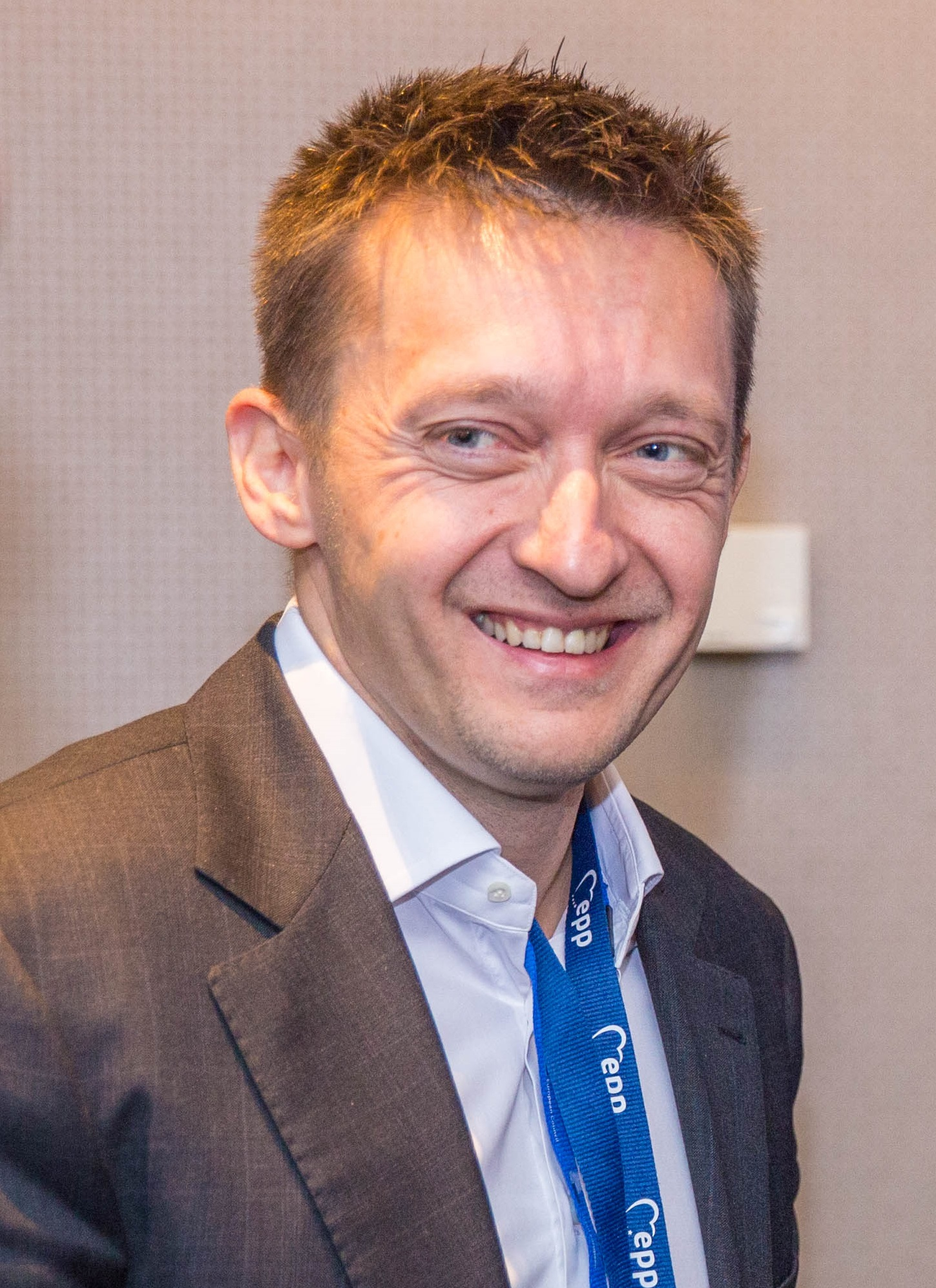
Antal Rogán has been named the minister of propaganda. State-controlled media and intelligence services fell under his purview.

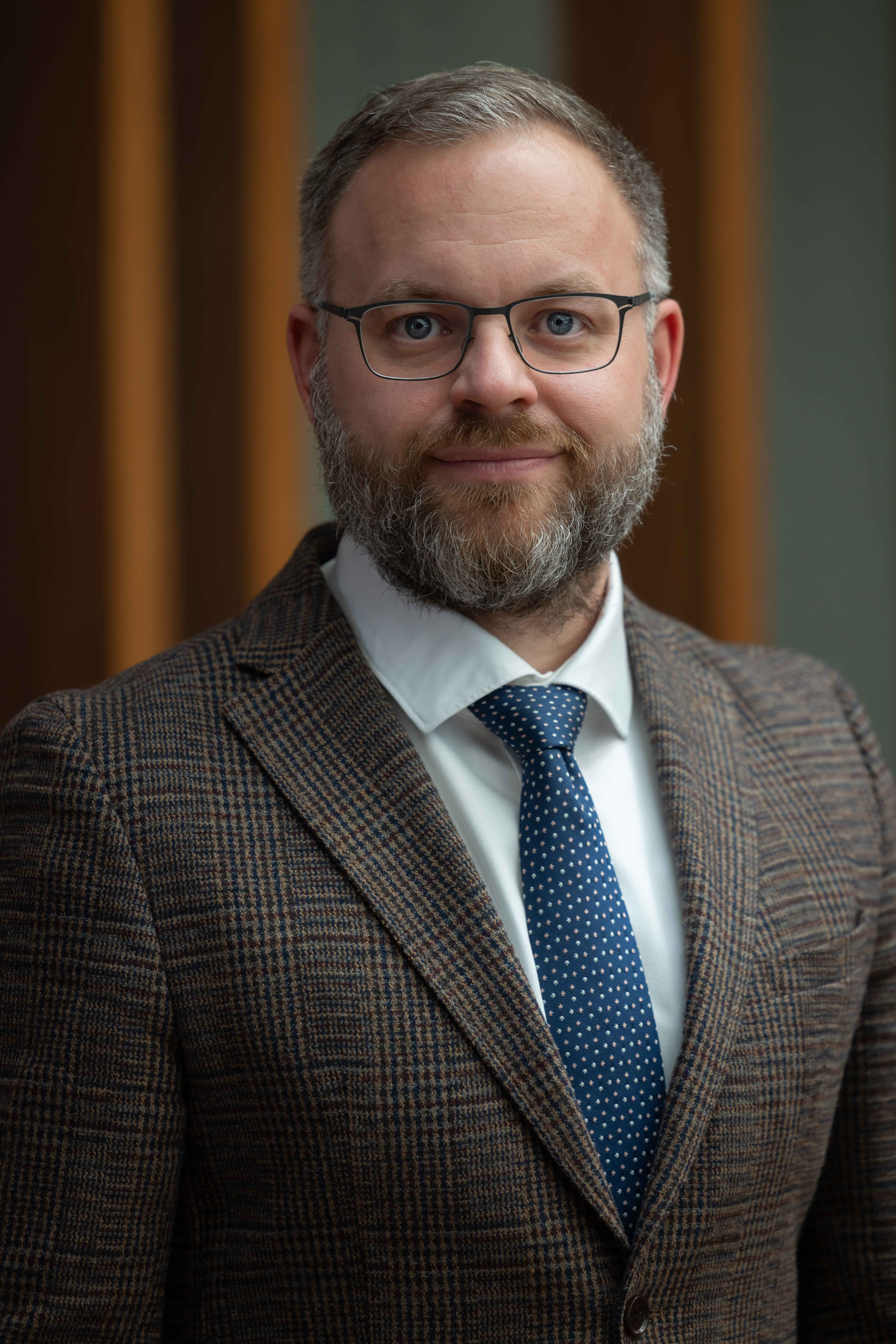
Balázs Orbán (no relation to Viktor Orbán) has been Fidesz's campaign manager since 2025.

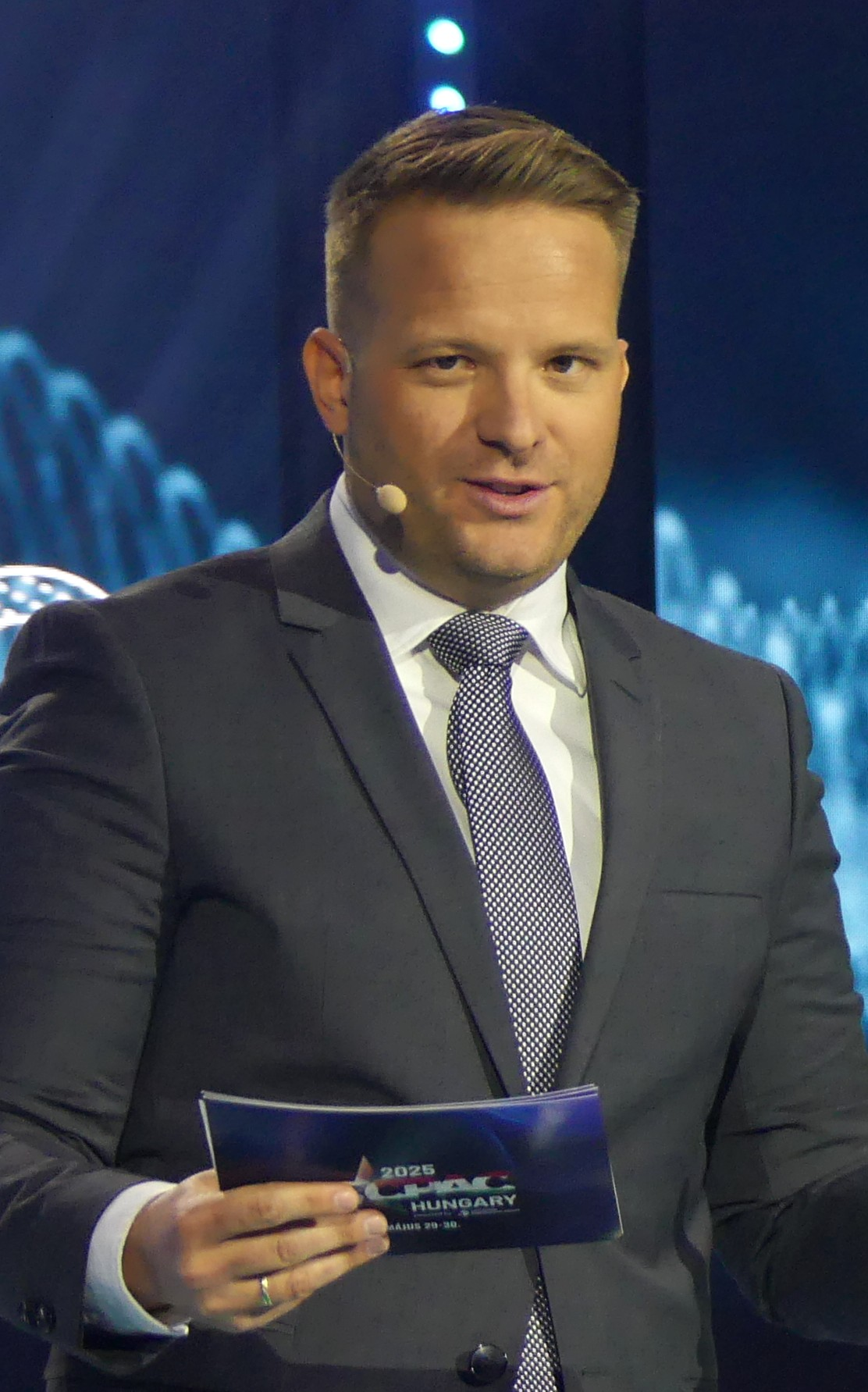
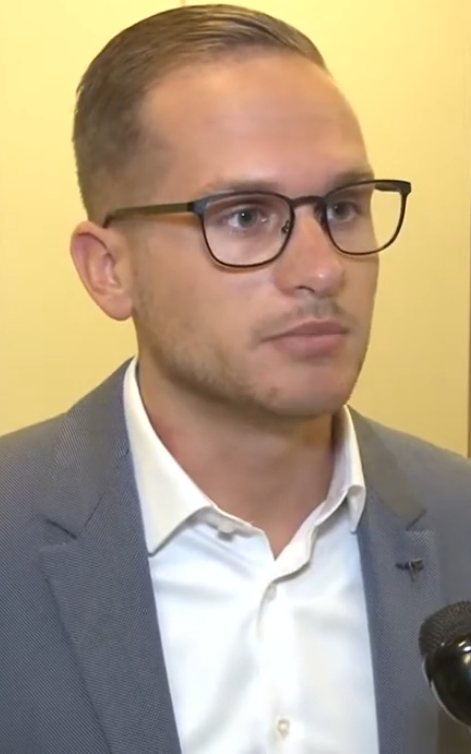
Dániel Bohár (left) and Dániel Deák (right) have worked as influencers for Megafon, Fidesz's outsourced campaign team. Financed by taxpayer money, Megafon has spent a large amount of money on advertising, even on international scales.

Flag of CÖF, one of Fidesz's proxy organizations, which has received millions of forints yearly from public funds. The party's negative campaigning was usually outsourced to CÖF, and it was responsible for organizing Fidesz's Peace Marches.

Freedom in the World categorizes Hungary partly free since 2019. View chart definition.

=== History ===
In the 1990s, Fidesz often received over 40% support. However, following the 1994 elections, it had the fewest seats in Parliament. In their election postmortem, Fidesz blamed the "concentrated campaign" in the press against them for their poor performance. Fidesz's elite realized they needed to improve their media presence.

In 1993, Fidesz treasurer Lajos Simicska privatized the state advertising company, Mahir, whose posters served Viktor Orbán's campaigns until 2014, and who took a hold of the newspaper Magyar Nemzet. Following the 1998 election victory, Fidesz replaced left-wing broadcasters and shut down the newspaper Kurir, which had given publicity to the party's awkward issues. The Prime Minister's Office and the state-owned gambling service advertised for hundreds of millions of forints in Magyar Nemzet in the months before the 2002 elections. After Fidesz lost the elections in 2002, Simicska founded Hír TV, the first cable news channel of Hungary. The party used Magyar Nemzet to launch political attacks, resulting in 95 libel actions launched against the newspaper, and millions of forints in fines. In 2005, tycoon Gábor Széles founded Echo TV and purchased Magyar Hírlap, turning both pro-Fidesz. These acquisitions played a crucial role in 2010, when Orbán returned to government, because in 2006, Hungarian Radio – with a Fidesz-leaning president – leaked Prime Minister Ferenc Gyurcsány's Őszöd speech, in which he said that his party had been lying "day and night", leading to violent protests nationwide. Simicska's Hír TV broadcast the protests live, calling it a "revolution", which led up to Fidesz's 2010 landslide victory. It was further helped by Simicska's media empire providing Orbán with platforms to deliver his messages, while Orbán avoided participating in prime ministerial debates.

After receiving a two-thirds majority in the 2010 elections, Fidesz amended the constitution by removing the media pluralism tenet, which required the National Assembly to codify precluding information monopolies. Through the Media Act, (Note: Unlike the 1996 Radio and Television Act, the 2010 Media Act was not preceded by any consultation with professional and civil organizations, and opposition parties voted against it.) the National Radio and Television Council (ORTT) – which managed frequency allocation and the redistribution of license fee revenues – was replaced by the National Media and Infocommunications Authority (NMHH) with jurisdiction over all media, governed by the Media Council. The NMHH imposed heavy fines for coverage it considered offensive, unbalanced, or breaking vaguely written regulations, and it allocated frequencies according to its own criteria. The Media Council only has Fidesz appointees and participates in investigations of mergers that involve companies "bearing editorial responsibility". The Media Council closed down Neo FM, leaving Simicska's Class FM as the sole nationwide commercial radio station. In 2010, the council declared the influential left-liberal Klubrádió's frequency tenders unsuccessful for arbitrary reasons (such as playing slightly less Hungarian music one day than required by law) and state-controlled entities stopped advertising on it, as it was the only independent radio station and it employed several journalists fired from the state radio under Orbán. This caused Klubrádió to lose 90% of its income.

In 2011, Magyar Televízió, Magyar Rádió, Duna Televízió, and the Hungarian News Agency (MTI) were united the Media Services Support and Asset Management Fund (MTVA), its director being appointed by the Chair of the Media Council. Advertising and program production were outsourced to companies close to Fidesz, such as Hung-Ister, formerly owned by Simicska. MTI released pro-government news for free to all outlets, which led to the closing of Independent News Agency, its only private rival. Magyar Televízió has hired multiple activists and journalists loyal to Fidesz, who earn four times as much as the average Hungarian. With its two-thirds majority, Fidesz used legal amendments to replace private market advertisement with its own state advertisement support scheme, make the media environment less transparent, and create obstacles for source protection.

In 2014, after Fidesz's third election victory, Orbán diversified state corruption by dropping Simicska, and instead he relied upon a dozen people submissive to him. After learning that Orbán lured journalists into leaving Simicska's organizations for the newly established Fidesz-friendly ones, Simicska left Fidesz on the so-called G-Day after insulting him, starting the Orbán–Simicska conflict. He turned his media – Magyar Nemzet, Hír TV, Lánchíd Rádió – oppositional, scrutinizing corruption, while Fidesz's posters depicted him alongside George Soros as puppet masters of the opposition. Orbán picked Lőrinc Mészáros, his former classmate, as replacement for Simicska, winning state and European Union procurements, and becoming the richest Hungarian and first Forbes billionaire. By 2018, Mészáros's empire consisted of hundreds of media outlets. After M1 was turned into a public news channel in 2015, it has flooded even rural Hungarians with manipulated and false political messages until its 2026 restructuring. Népszabadság, Hungary's de facto newspaper of record and main opposition daily, was shut down overnight in 2016. Fidesz's media falsely claimed that Jobbik politician and leader of the opposition Gábor Vona was a member of a terrorist group and gay.

After Fidesz's 2018 election victory, Simicska indirectly sold his remaining media portfolio to Mészáros. In November, the owners of 476 media outlets close to the government – making up 80% of all Hungarian media – freely donated their outlets to the newly established Central European Press and Media Foundation (KESMA), whose managers are Fidesz operatives. Orbán issued a decree declaring the acquisition of KESMA "a matter of national strategic importance", exempting it from scrutiny by the Competition Authority or the Media Council. Creating the illusion of diversity, KESMA is not subject to independent scrutiny. Starting 2018, the companies of Gyula Balásy won nearly all of the tenders issued by the Prime Minister's Office, without competition, profiting billions of forints, (Note: In 2017, the profit margin of Balásy's Lounge Design company was 36.9%, compared to other similar companies' average of 5.9%.) making Balásy one of the richest in the country. His companies were responsible for many of Fidesz's propaganda campaigns since 2005; these ads that were falsely claimed to be informative (Note: Per law, political campaigns can only be carried out by political parties during the campaign period – before elections – paid for with their own money. By claiming that these ads were "informative", Fidesz circumvented these rules, as the communication of the government was loosely limited, especially since there was no independent authority that enforced these regulations. Starting 2021, these ads were clearly used for political reasons, by discrediting opposition politicians.) became a symbol of Fidesz's System of National Cooperation (NER), routinely scaring Hungarians with some source of danger, while Fidesz is painted as the defenders of the people. Starting around 2018, the government targeted journalists and critics of Orbán with Pegasus, an Israeli spyware. During the COVID-19 pandemic, pro-government media published over 600 stories claiming that the opposition is following an anti-vaccination strategy based on quotes allegedly made by political analysts, despite the fact that two courts have found these stories to be false.

The printed press had been taken over: by 2018, Népszava was the only remaining independent national daily. (Note: Népszava is owned by a businessman who has strong ties to the Socialist Party. After an agreement with Orbán, he was able to acquire and finance the newspaper.) Magyar Nemzet was shut down by Simicska, then reopened by Mészáros, and it has been operated since 2019 by KESMA. All national and local dailies were transferred to KESMA, and they are strictly coordinated, with their political sections sometimes being word-for-word identical. Radio channels are similarly dominated by Fidesz, with Klubrádió remaining the only independent one. Since 2014, a former spokesperson of Orbán has provided music radios with daily packages of three-minute hourly news. TV2 was bought by Orbán's ally, Andrew G. Vajna. When RTL Klub was hit with a pre-profit advertisement revenue tax, they filled their news with corruption stories, winning top ratings. Another TV station that remained independent is ATV. The state's oligarchs also acquired online mediums, such as Origo and Index. Independent investigative sites such as Átlátszó.hu and Direkt36 are supported by foundations, thus labelled as foreign-paid enemies. Stigmatizing and discrediting independent media, such as by calling them "fake news factories" and "dollar media", has kept information contrary to the government's narrative hidden from its voters. The regime has discriminated against independent journalists by depicting them as foreign agents who are destroying the nation's good fortune, traitors, "Hungary-haters", or "non-Hungarians". Moreover, they have been intimidated by threats of unemployment, delicensing, bureaucratic harassment, and revenue loss.

Social media advertisements are crucial for Orbán's communication strategy; in the run-up to the 2024 European Parliament election, Fidesz spent four times as much as all opposition parties, and five of the top eight most promoted campaign videos across the EU on YouTube were paid for by Fidesz. As political ads have been banned on Facebook since October 2025, Orbán announced his "Fight Club" (Harcosok Klubja), whose recruited activists – called "digital freedom fighters" or "digital warriors" – were to fight the "foreign-backed opposition" online by commenting and sharing content. This turned out to be ineffective, as there was no significant disruption among the comments posted under posts by opposition figures and independent media outlets, and they did not significantly amplify the voices of Fidesz politicians. Troll farms consisting of thousands of fake Facebook profiles are known to have been following and liking posts by Fidesz politicians. This operation has been run by Digitális Demokráciafejlesztési Ügynökség, the organization behind Digital Civic Circles (Digitális Polgári Kör, DPK) and its events, which are strongly tied to Fidesz.

In the lead up to the 2026 elections, MTI released ten times as much news about Orbán than Péter Magyar, the leader of the largest party. Two days after the landslide victory of the Tisza Party, the public news channel of Hungary, M1, presented their news objectively, without added comments, and citing independent media outlets, unlike in previous years. In the months following, Fidesz's media empire collapsed, which included layoffs, ceasing of entire periodicals or just their print editions, changes of editor-in-chief, and dailies turning into weeklies. (Note: Ceased completely: Tények (lit. 'Facts'), TV2's propaganda program; Ripost.hu, national weekly; Metropol.hu, national daily; Soproni Téma, local daily; Publication of print edition ceased: Népszava, national daily; Bors, national daily; Nógrád Megyei Hírlap, regional daily; Heves Megyei Hírlap, regional daily; 24 Óra, regional daily; Mandiner, national weekly; Dailies turned into weeklies: Magyar Nemzet, national; Békés Megyei Hírlap, regional; Délmagyarország, regional; Észak-Magyarország, regional; Fejér Megyei Hírlap, regional; Hajdú-Bihari Napló, regional; Kelet-Magyarország, regional; Napló, regional; Petőfi Népe, regional; Somogy Megyei Hírlap, regional; Tolnai Népújság, regional; Új Dunántúli Napló, regional; Új Néplap, regional; Mass layoffs (employees affected): Mészáros's Mediaworks Hungary (200); PestiSrácok.hu, national news site (all, 20); Világgazdaság, national daily (editorial staff); Origo, national news site (30); Magyar Nemzet, national now-weekly (half); Mandiner, national weekly (60); Megafon Központ, Fidesz's national campaign team (all, 55–57); Népszava, national now–news site (30%); Change of editor-in-chief: Index, national news site; Délmagyarország, regional now-weekly; Észak-Magyarország, regional now-weekly; Boon.hu, regional news site) This is due to the fact that these mediums could only be sustained through an artificial, distorted market. This collapse resulted in Hungary not having a political daily after 150 years. In an open letter, Fidesz politicians Tibor Navracsics and Orsolya Ferencz asked "national investors" to save the "quality right-wing media portfolio". Balásy said in a tearful interview that he is willing to give up his companies to the Hungarian state in their entirety.

=== Characteristics ===
Between 2015 and 2023, 1.36 trillion forints (€3.5 billion) were spent on communication under Antal Rogán; approximately 418 billion forints (€1.1 billion) were spent on state propaganda in 2025. MTVA – the public service organization which included seven television channels, seven radio channels, and the Hungarian News Agency – received 127.7 billion forints (€412 million) for 2015. Between 2010 and 2014, nearly half of all public communications funds were distributed to a single applicant, or without a formal competition, with 60% of funds being received by three agencies alone. A significant portion of public-sector advertisements was allocated to government-loyal media, and the imposed advertising tax hindered independent outlets' financial situations. Independent media is almost completely excluded from state advertizing; for example, in 2018, pro-government TV2 received 67% of taxpayer-funded advertizing, while the independent RTL Klub, with a slightly higher viewership, received only 1%.

Independent media outlets are often denied entry from events held by Fidesz politicians – unlike mediums close to the government –, claiming that the event is not "open to the press", contrary to Hungarian constitutional law. Several outlets, such as Magyar Hang, Radio Free Europe/Radio Liberty, and Direkt36, were excluded from Kormányinfó, a regular-held government press briefing held by Chief of Staff Gergely Gulyás, with varying fabricated reasons, even though mediums with much fewer readers were allowed. Opposition politicians only received five minutes of air time on public television every four years, the legal minimum; otherwise, opposition politicians and viewpoints were absent on public service media. Government agencies often failed to respond in a timely manner or respond at all to requests for information of fundamental public interest that they are required to provide under freedom of information laws, or they only made it available once legal proceedings were initiated against them. In some cases, information was heavily censored or illegible. The government forbid entire sectors – such as staff of public education and medical institutions – from talking to media without prior permission. Public officials largely refused to communicate with independent media. In 2024, government-aligned media outlets lost 67 out of 76 (88%) press-correction lawsuits, while independent media only lost 7 out of 27 (26%).

The pro-Fidesz Magyar Hírlap has cited Orosz Hírek (lit. 'Russian News') over 1500 times in 2023. It is an anonymous blog that republishes the banned Russia Today's and RIA Novosti's Russian propaganda and disinformation. Its posts were cited by pro-government dailies, such as Magyar Demokrata, Pesti Srácok, and Metropol.

Megafon, Fidesz's outsourced campaign team, has played a substantial role in shaping Hungarian discourse. It first appeared in 2020, publishing short, government-friendly videos, with some of its influencers being known television hosts or political analysts. Megafon Központ, the private company funding Megafon, was financed by taxpayer money. (Note: Megafon Központ sued Telex for this claim, but the court found that the claim was well-founded.) In the 2022 election campaign, Megafon received twice as much money as the opposition did from public financing. It spent a large amount of money, even on international scales: at the beginning of 2024, it spent more on Facebook ads than all Croat and Slovak political advertisers combined. In the first half of 2024, it spent €2.2 million on social media ads, with 54% of these ads containing hostile narratives. Its influencers regularly appeared at Fidesz campaign events and rallies, and 68 Fidesz politicians are known to have participated in Megafon's trainings teaching campaign technique, political communication, and video editing. Megafon's messaging is centralized; all of its influencers emphasize the same narratives, but they attempt to appear unique by differing in style. Its videos frequently feature reasoning fallacies, and use dramatic images and music to portray the enemy, while Orbán is shown as bravely standing up to evil.

Another similar proxy organization is Civil Összefogás Fórum (CÖF), to which Fidesz usually outsources its negative campaigning. It spent €400,000 in the 2024 election campaign, and similarly to Megafon, it also posted short-form videos targeting opposition politicians. The foundation has also hosted Fidesz's Peace Marches (Békemenet), and has received 60–70 million forints per year from public funds. In 2024, CÖF's vans plastered with billboards showing pro-war politicians sitting in Russian tanks toured the country.

Fidesz has employed a central digital team of 15–20 people, tasked with extracting politically relevant information that could be used to the political advantage of Fidesz. During the 2022 election campaign, this team was monitoring the public statements of opposition politicians Péter Márki-Zay and Gergely Karácsony. In an interview a few days before the Russo-Ukrainian war's outbreak, Márki-Zay said that – in accordance with a potential NATO decision – he would provide military aid to Ukraine. Relying on this, Fidesz claimed the opposition would drag Hungary into war. By early 2025, they were struggling to find leverage against Future Prime Minister Péter Magyar, despite him giving daily speeches lasting for hours.

Fidesz's campaigns used 80/20 issues in every election, allowing Fidesz to secure the support of 80% of voters while pushing the opposition into the remaining 20%: the previous Socialist-Liberal governments in 2010, utility bill cuts in 2014, migration in 2018, and the Russo-Ukrainian war in 2022. The campaigns portrayed a source of danger – IMF, Brussels, migrants, Soros, Zelenskyy –, which only Orbán could stop in order to save Hungarians.

Miklós Haraszti stated that Orbán's rule eliminated all guarantees of a free press by 2018, and that he turned independent media into a centralized propaganda machine, with only a few journalists remaining who hold onto struggling independent media outlets. This is partly the reason why Freedom House's Freedom in the World has categorized Hungary as partly free starting 2019. According to Haraszti, this restriction of information is crucial for an illiberal democracy, which consists of depriving voters from making informed choices. Mária Vásárhelyi described Fidesz as "a brain-washing and money-laundering contraption" and "a tool for party propaganda". This media monopoly is financed by tax money and has flooded society with uncontested electoral propaganda. In 2026, before the change of government, Reporters Without Borders' World Press Freedom Index ranked Hungary 74th and categorized it as "problematic", citing the highly concentrated media, the undermining of media pluralism, the Sovereignty Protection Office, shrinking revenue, and false accusations.

The Hungarian media system was designed to deter scrutiny. By avoiding jailing and violence – commonly found in authoritarian regimes – Orbán's model acquired power while maintaining plausible deniability: following the Putin model, they allowed just enough independent media to claim the existence of a free press, with some of these critical media outlets being market leaders. This maintains the illusion of pluralism and freedom, even though the reach of the independent media, which is mostly online, is confined to the capital. Experts and journalists have expressed disappointment towards the European Union for not intervening. The structure of media has been changed by means of soft censorship: arbitrary state interventions targeting the structure of media markets, and weakening of the financial viability of government-critical outlets. The government achieved a degree of media control unprecedented in an EU member state. Fidesz's communication is characterized by its populist rhetoric.

== 2015 European migrant crisis and the "Soros Plan" ==
George Soros would also like to see migrants receive lighter sentences for the crimes they commit. George Soros, with significant amounts of funding, supports numerous organizations that assist immigration and defend immigrants who have committed unlawful acts. Do you support this point of the Soros Plan? YES/NO.

— A question from the 2017 National Consultation survey about the "Soros Plan"

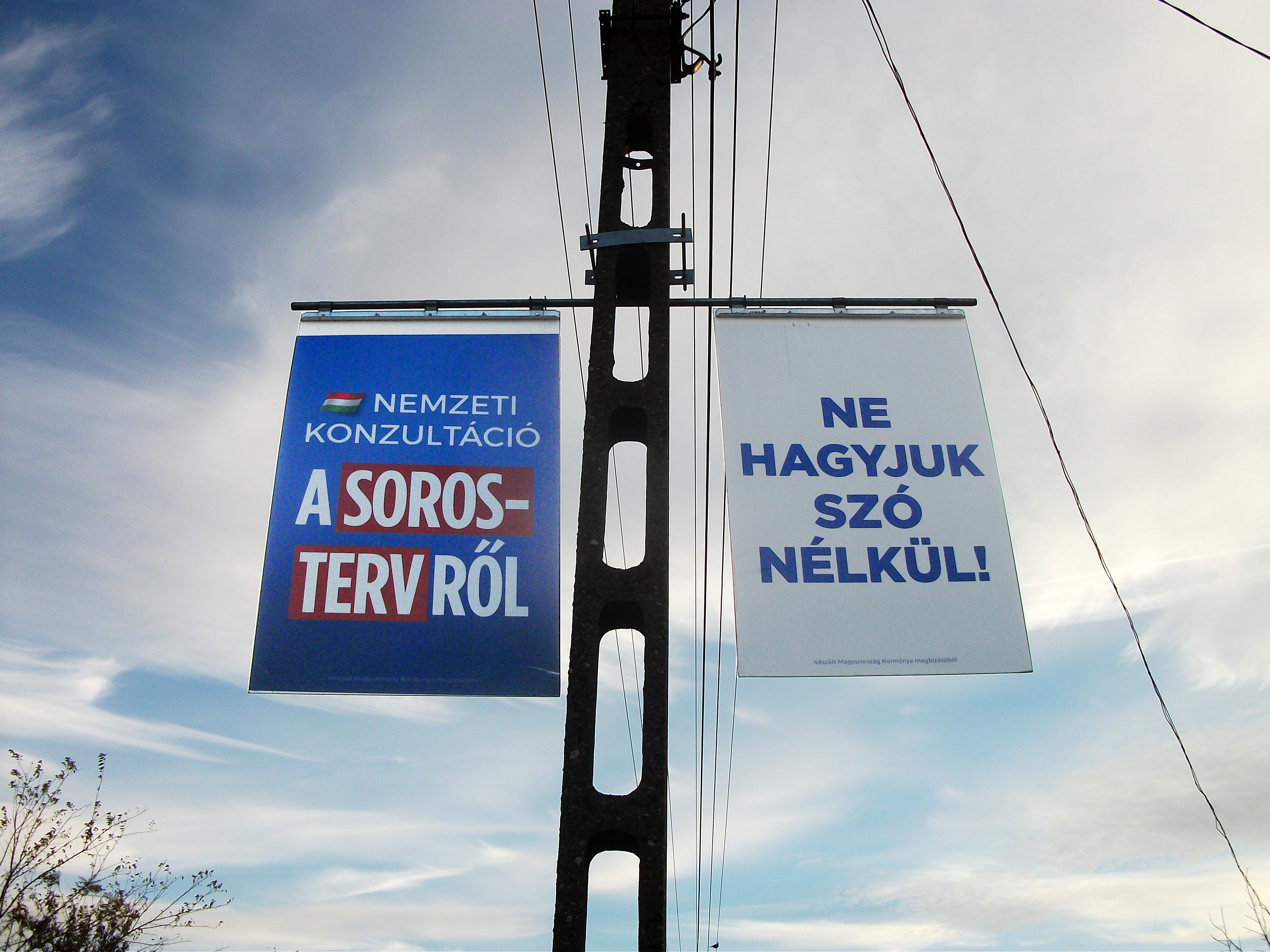
Posters in Zichyújfalu stating "National Consultation about the Soros Plan. Let's not remain silent!"

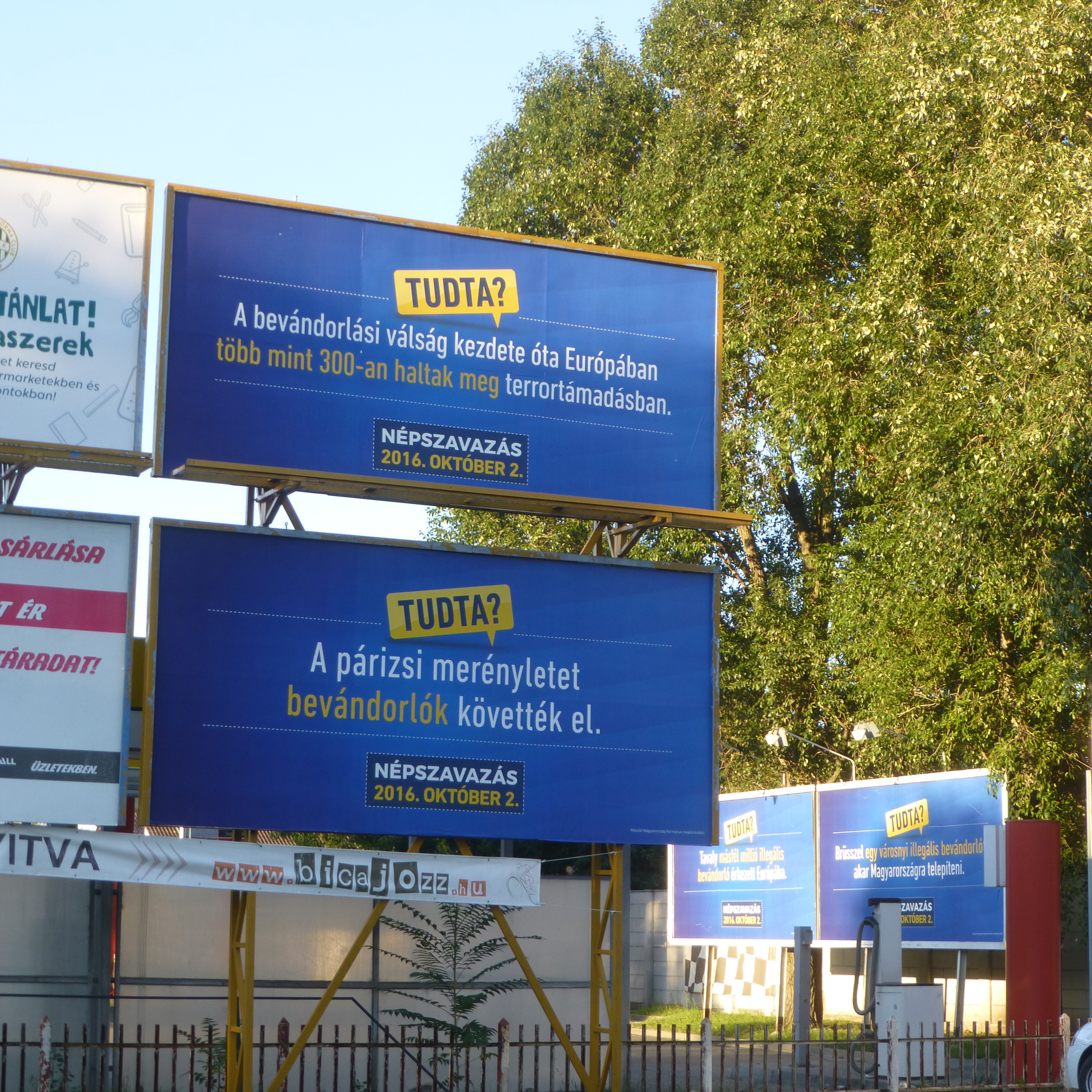
Top: "Since the start of the migrant crisis, more than 300 people died in Europe due to terror attacks."
Bottom: "The Paris assassinations were committed by immigrants."

The campaign included government slogans of an omnipresent media presence on billboards, posters, TV advertisements, print media, and leaflets.

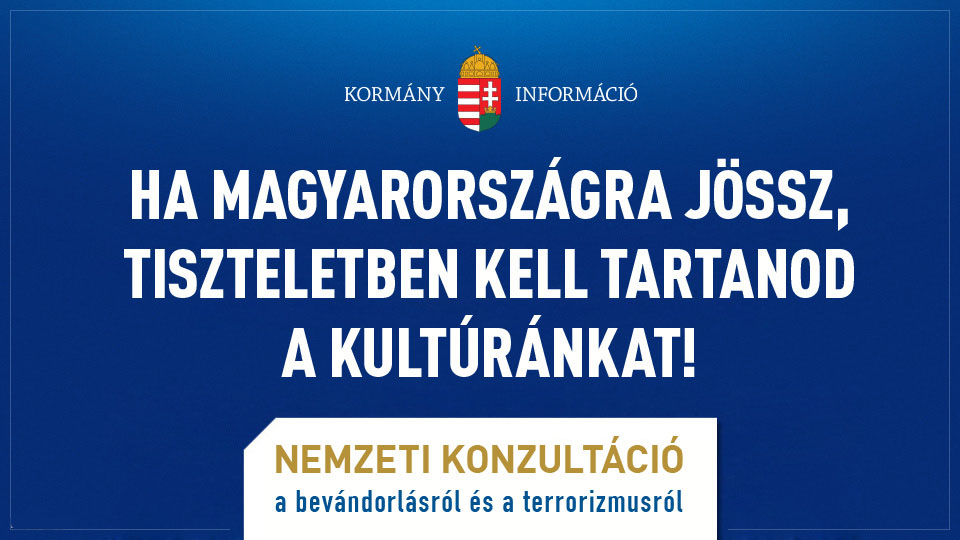
"If you come to Hungary, you have to respect our culture!" These billboards written in Hungarian were targeting Hungarians only, instead of refugees. Despite its anti-immigrant rhetoric, Fidesz recruited guest workers for Hungary's labor market.

Around 2013, the political consultant duo George Birnbaum and Arthur J. Finkelstein chose George Soros, a Hungarian-born American philanthropist, as a new enemy whom Hungarians can be told to hate. He was blamed for "fighting Christianity with his evil Soros Plan", as he is a Jewish billionaire and supporter of liberal and democratic values, who made his fortune in the US.

During the 2015 European migrant crisis, hundreds of thousands of migrants and refugees crossed Hungary's southern border, the majority fleeing wars in Syria, Iraq, and Afghanistan. Most of them were on their way to Western Europe, particularly Germany; very few of them wanted to stay in Hungary. In May, the European Commission proposed mandatory quotas to redistribute asylum seekers.

Regarding the crisis, Fidesz's position was that agents of the EU and UN financed by Soros want uncontrolled immigration, a population exchange in Hungary and in Europe, while the party painted itself as the defenders of Hungary against "global powers" and "globalists". Billboards across the country claimed that Soros wants to settle millions of Africans and Middle Easterners in Hungary, while the Orbán regime portrayed itself as the ones who defend the national interests of Hungary, such as by deploying security forces and by building a southern border barrier against people who – according to them – threaten local culture, spread lethal diseases, and rape women. The government's position was that Hungarians and other EU members moving within the Union was not migration as they were working, but migrants from elsewhere – pejoratively referred to as migránsok, a word with negative connotations in Hungary – wanted to take away something from the locals, despite their presence being marginal. According to Orbán, the intra-European hierarchies should be rearranged and Europe's historical privileges should be restored with the help of Central Europe against the "weak West". He said that "Christian Europe" must be rescued against terrorists, barbaric hordes, economic migrants, and Muslims.

In the lead-up to the 2018 parliamentary election, the Parliament voted in favor of the so-called Stop Soros laws, which empowered the secret service to control NGOs in case their communication amounted to a punishable support of migration, with anyone "facilitating illegal immigration" facing one year of imprisonment. Billions of forints of taxpayers' money were spent on the 2016 referendum, the results of which were invalid due to not reaching the required 50% turnout. In August 2017, National Consultation surveys were sent to every citizen, containing questions relating to the alleged plan of Soros, referred to as the "Soros Plan". Anti-Soros posters flooded the country, with a Fidesz MP likening Soros to Satan. The party's propaganda used dramatic music and imagery to portray immigrants. Pro-Fidesz media treated all grants awarded to Hungarian civil societies by Soros's Open Society Foundations (OSF) as forming part of a secretive plot by foreign-funded political activists. Years after the migration wave through Hungary ended, newspapers still ran headlines such as "Migration pressure growing in the region".

Employees of MTVA – the fund that financed Duna Média, Hungary's public service broadcaster – stated that the network focused on negative stories of migrants and refugees, linking them to terrorism and crime, stating that millions of dangerous migrants are waiting to enter the country. They recalled that M1 – the public news channel of Hungary – broadcast the government's anti-immigration messages, at times false stories, blaming Soros and Brussels. Its news program often showed videos of terrorist attacks in Europe and migrants clashing with police on the southern border. Some news stories were directly dictated to reporters, including character assassinations of openly government-critical people. Other Fidesz-supporting media outlets also frequently reported on Western European terroristic attacks by migrants, and the campaign of the government was backed by press releases of the police and other state agencies. Many analysts described messages labelled "government information" as "propaganda campaigns", and the Limited Election Observation Mission of the Organization for Security and Co-operation in Europe stated that "the public broadcaster [...] amplified anti-migration rhetoric".

Despite this campaign, refugees from the Russian invasion of Ukraine (Note: There are around 150,000 Hungarians living in Transcarpathia (Kárpátalja), which was part of Hungary until 1920.) arrived and were welcomed in Hungary, which necessitated a selective reworking of the anti-migrant rhetoric, emphasizing that they were "white, Christian, European refugees". To combat Hungary's labor shortages, a relatively rapid admittance of "third-country-national" "guest workers" (vendégmunkások) occurred, who were permitted to gain residence for up to three years. The presence of Ukrainian refugees and guest workers created a seemingly contradictory position, and raised problems with the citizen/migrant binary.

Critics attacked Orbán as racist and authoritarian. His campaigns played a role in xenophobia rising among Hungarians, especially the eldelry and those living in rural areas, as they do not use the Internet as a news source and pro-government media dominates in these regions. Previously somewhat marginal views were significantly normalized or mainstreamed. An autumn 2015 poll showed that 60% of Hungarians feared the alleged Islamification of Europe.

== LGBTQ people and rights ==
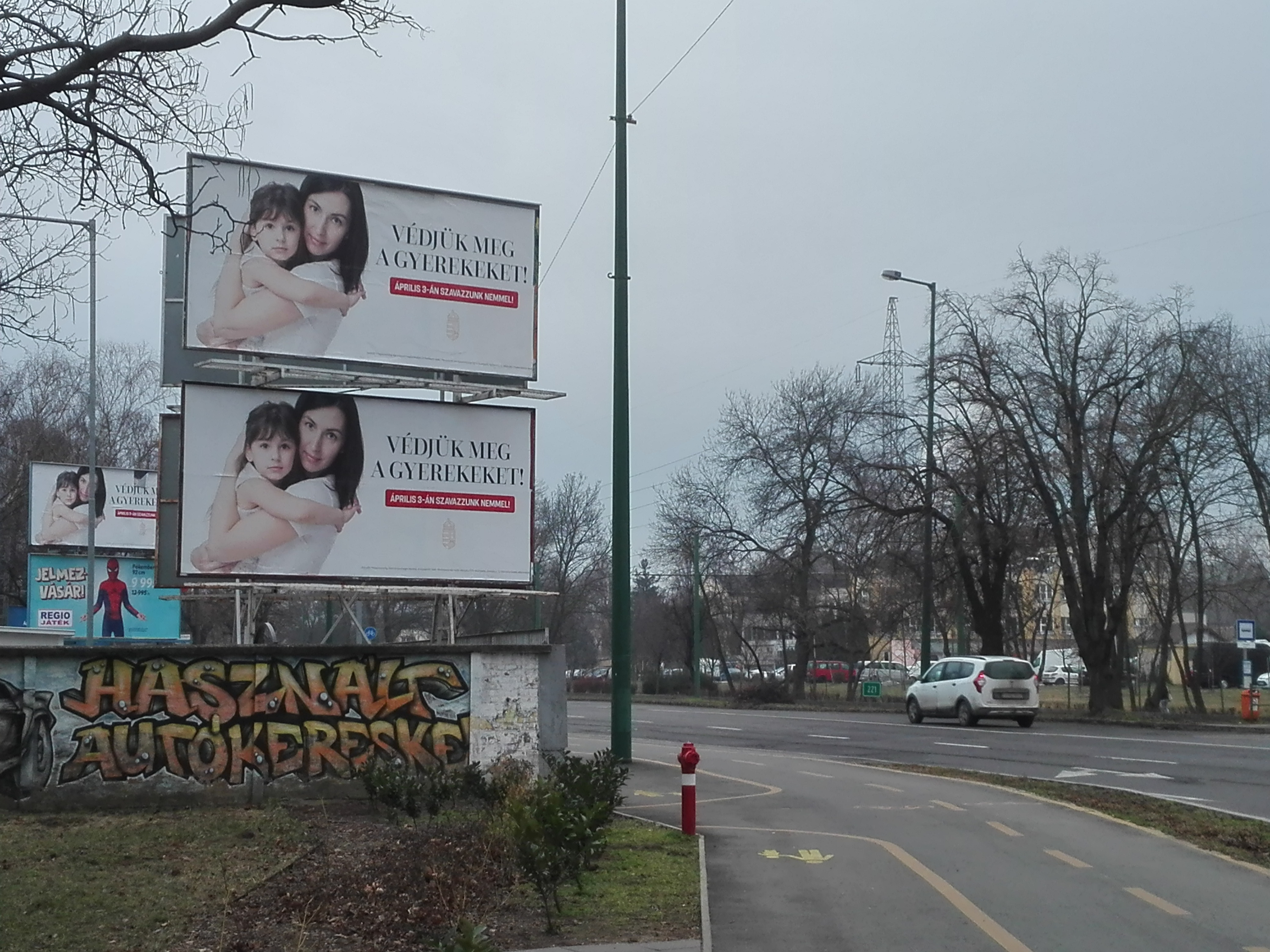
Billboards in Szeged stating "Let's protect our children!" Fidesz portrayed itself as the protector of children from woke ideology, the promotion of homosexuality, and dangerous sex-change surgeries before the 2022 referendum.

The anti-LGBTQ narrative became a central part of Orbán's agenda in 2020, after their campaigns against Brussels, Soros, and migrants. Orbán's discourse constructs an out-group of LGBTQ communities, and emphasizes their "otherness" by linking them to the Western world.

One of the focuses of Fidesz's 2022 election campaign was targeting sexual minorities, painting them as a threat. Orbán frames his narrative as the representation of the parents' will, saying that "in terms of homosexuality, Hungary is a patient, tolerant country. But there is a red line that cannot be crossed, and this is how I sum up my opinion: leave our children alone." Other Fidesz politicians also stated that children must be protected from "the promotion of homosexuality". Fidesz claimed that if the opposition wins, children will be promoted dangerous sex-change surgeries. In 2021, despite heavy criticism by international organizations, the Parliament passed the anti-LGBTQ law, which blurs the line between homosexuality and pedophilia, and bans minors' exposure to LGBTQ themes. A referendum was held in 2022 about "sexual propaganda" in schools. Denying the fact that its campaigning was homophobic, Fidesz characterized its position as child protection. The results of the referendum were invalid due to not reaching the required 50% turnout. In 2025, the Parliament banned holding or attending Pride parades, with Orbán saying "We won't let woke ideology endanger our kids." Defying the ban, an estimated 200,000 people attended that year's, biggest-ever Budapest Pride parade. In 2026, a court ordered Mediaworks Hungary – which controls KESMA – to pay an unprecedented 100 million forints (€275,000) in damages to a gay family due to their smear campaign, accusing them of human trafficking and child purchase.

Starting circa 2008, 30–35% of Hungarians supported same-sex marriage; that started to rise around 2024, when 46% supported same-sex marriage and adoption rights. After the 2026 elections, Medián's polls showed that 68% of Hungarians supported same-sex marriage and adoption rights. This shift was attributed to the generational replacement theory, as well as Fidesz's anti-gay campaign being contrary to younger generations' attitude. The government's systematic failures in child protection – e.g. the pardon scandal, the Szőlő Street scandal – caused the party's child protection and main anti-LGBTQ campaign to be perceived as inauthentic.

== Russo-Ukrainian war ==
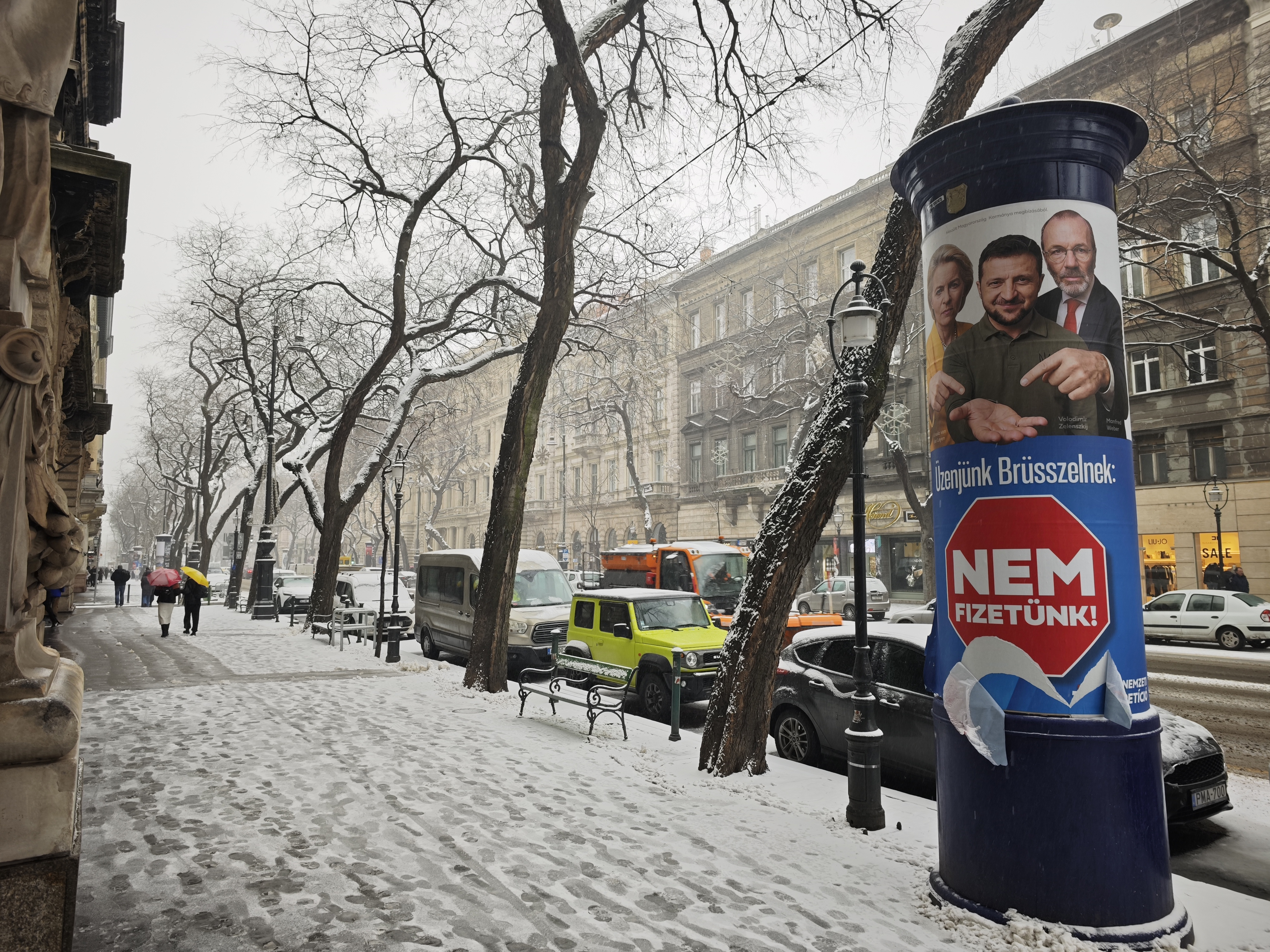
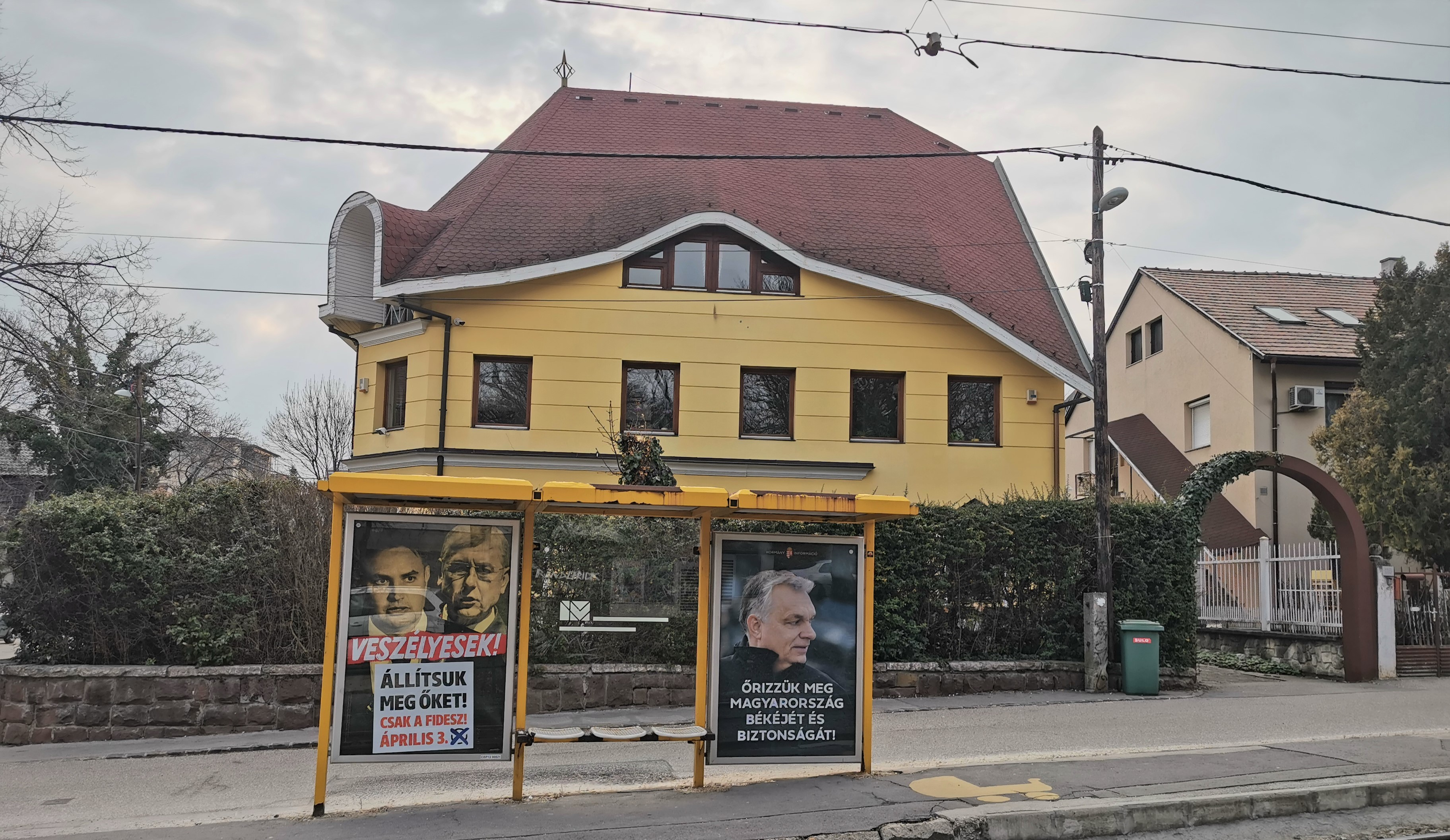
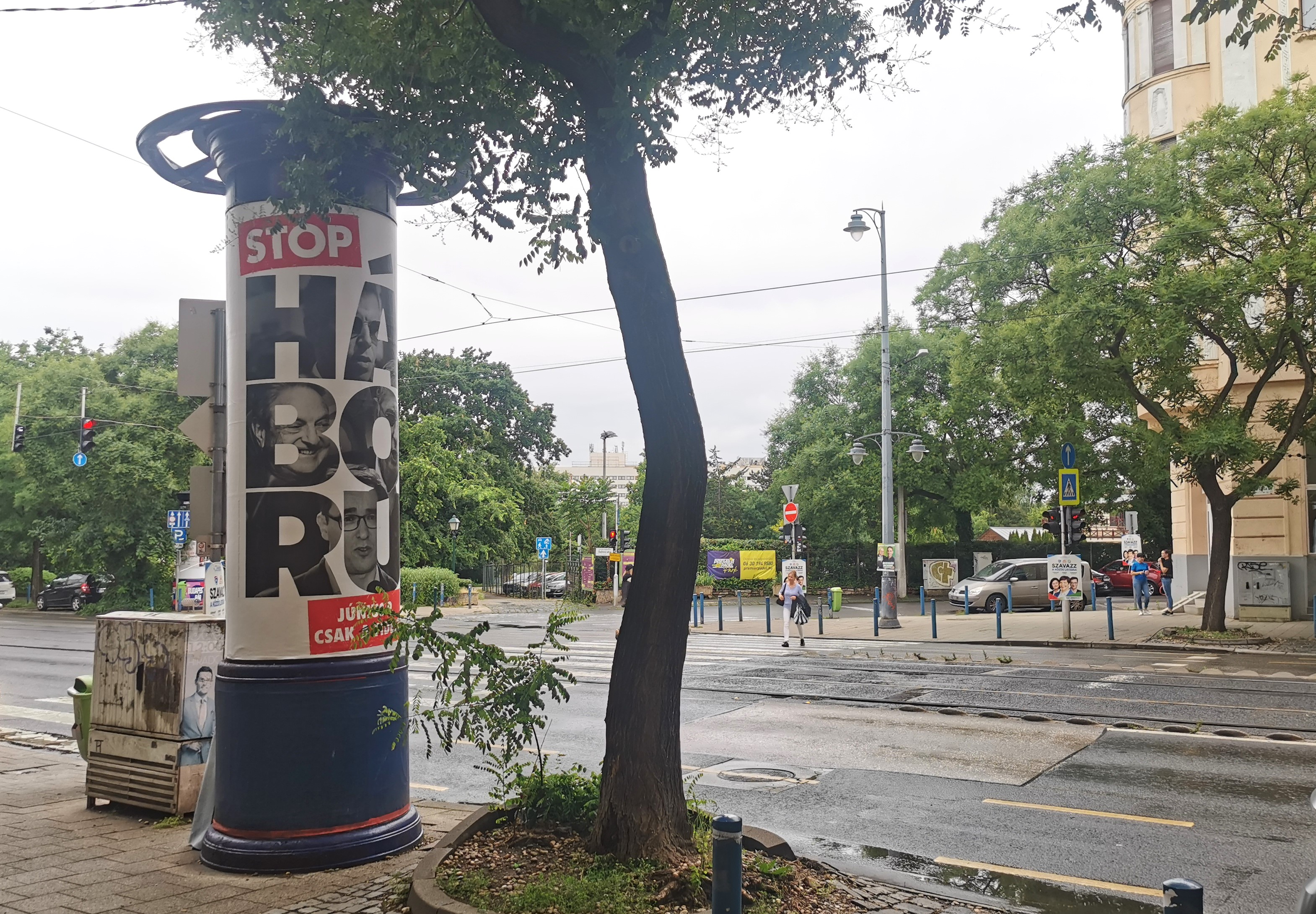
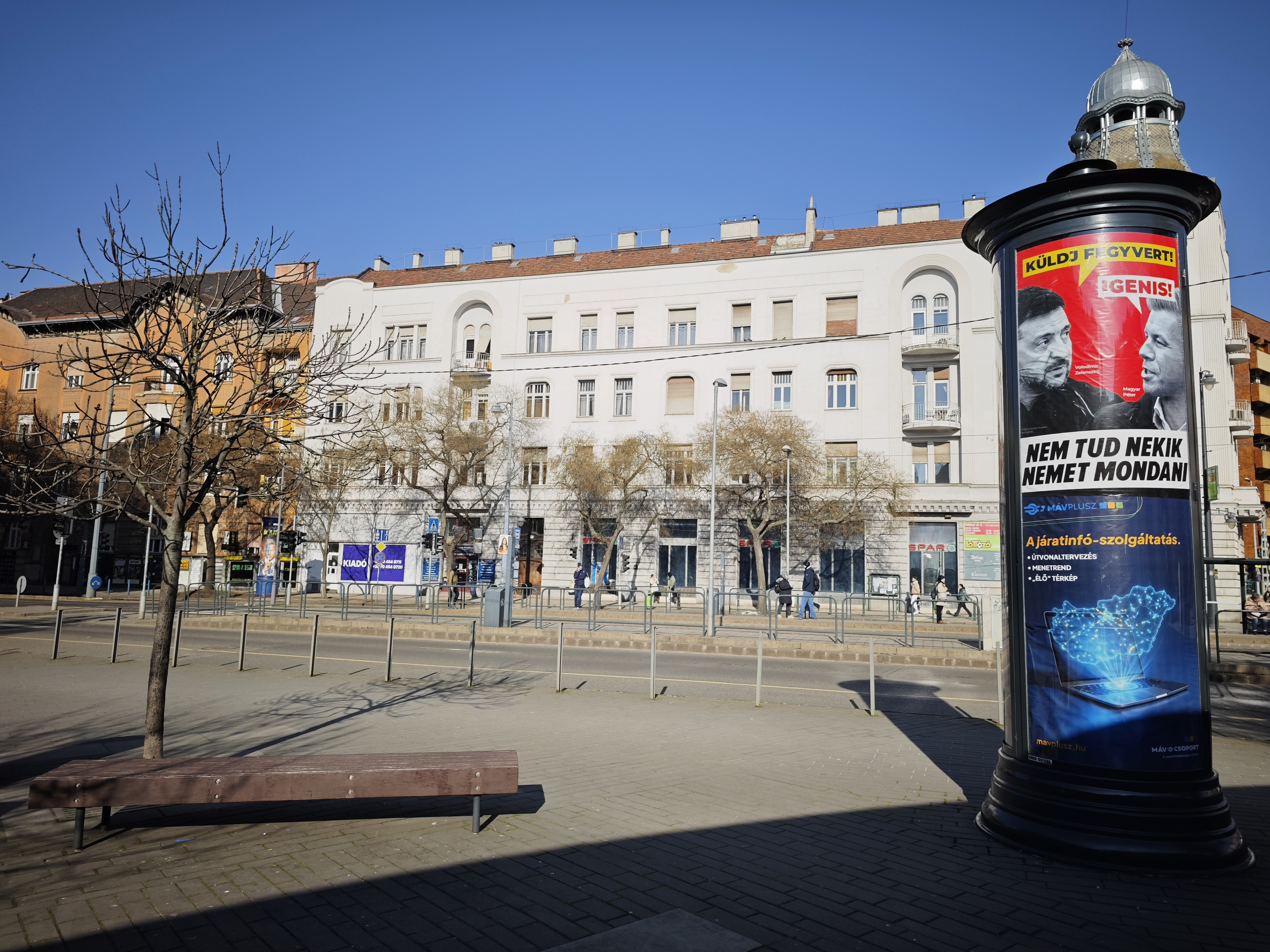
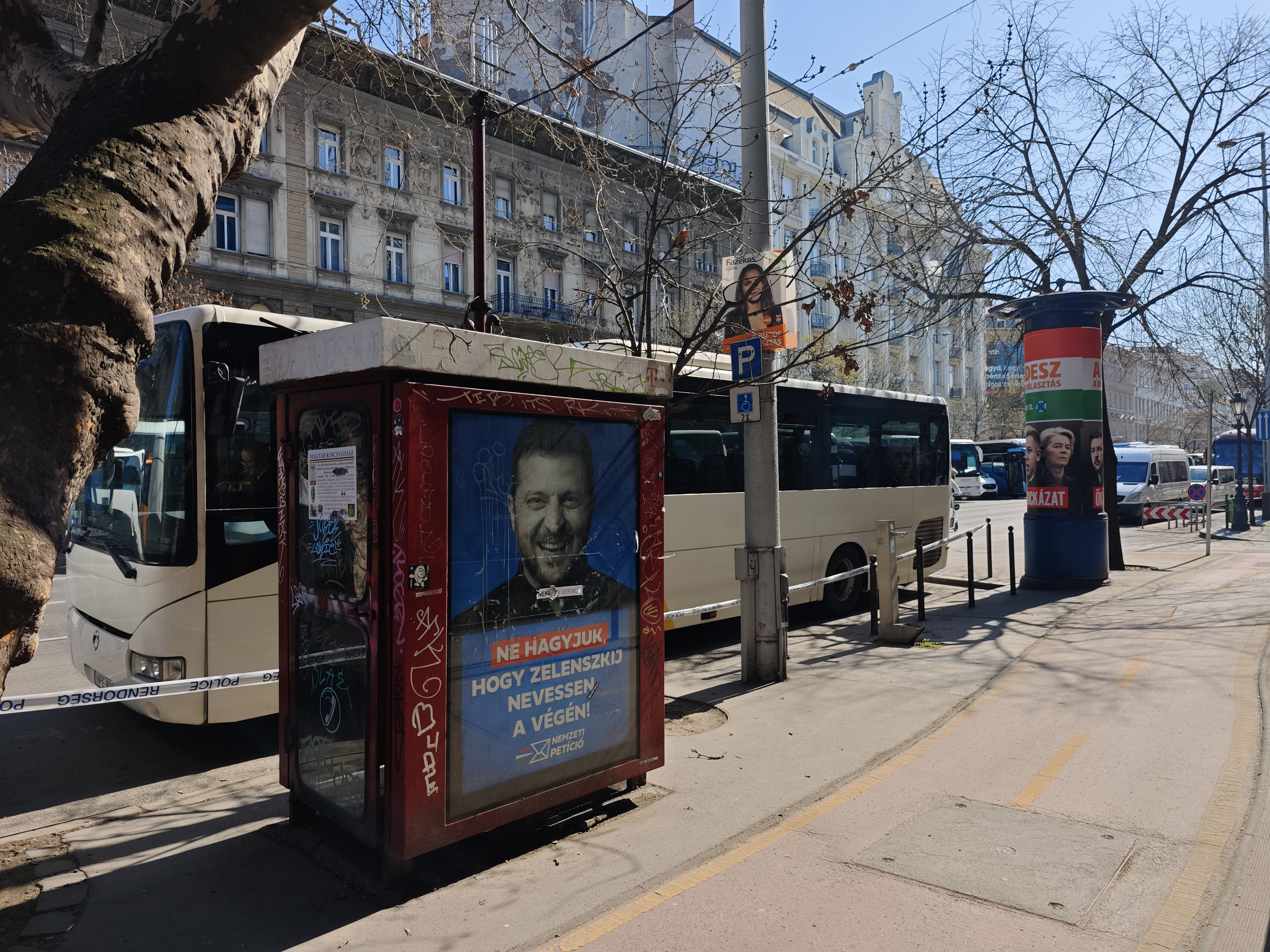
Posters and billboards nationwide have accused opposition and European politicians – such as Péter Magyar, Péter Márki-Zay; Ursula von der Leyen, Volodymyr Zelenskyy, and Manfred Weber – of dragging Hungary into war by sending weapons and troops, while Fidesz is depicted as the safe choice: the only option for peace.

Domestic and foreign policy considerations, as well as lacking minority rights contributed to Ukraine becoming the primary adversary: Ukraine was among the least liked countries by Hungarians, and Hungary blocked the accession of Ukraine to the European Union, citing conflicts over language use, thus serving Russia's interests. The outbreak of the Russian-Ukrainian war allowed Fidesz to make its "war or peace" slogan one of the central themes of its election campaigns. In the beginning, pro-government media reported mostly objectively; pro-Kremlin narratives were "outsourced" to Fidesz-associated experts and opinion leaders. Later, Ukrainian President Volodymyr Zelenskyy was increasingly blamed by figures in state media programs, Fidesz MPs, and Fidesz-affiliated influencers, while Russian narratives were repeated on state media.

"Brutal forced conscription continues in Ukraine" The daily program The Horrors of War (A háború borzalmai) ran on Hungary's public news channel, M1. With its war-themed set design with flames and rubble, the program focused on suffering caused by Ukraine.

Using manipulatively edited excerpts of speeches made by European politicians, Fidesz's media has accused the opposition, Brussels, European countries, and NATO members of dragging Hungary into war by seeking to send weapons and soldiers to Ukraine, despite opposition leaders refuting it. Fidesz has painted Ukraine as the main source of danger instead of Russia. State-linked media has been described as Kremlin-friendly, conveying conspiracies about the war. On billboards, sanctions were depicted as bombs, despite Orbán joining Western allies in condemning Russia and supporting sanctions. Pro-government outlets have blamed the United States under Joe Biden for the war. Orbán has portrayed himself as the only European leader who is fighting for peace. Megafon Központ, a proxy of Fidesz, has claimed that European leaders want nuclear war and children may be sent to the front lines. The public broadcaster's program The Horrors of War showed videos in which Hungarian POWs from Transcarpathia express their gratitude to their Russian captors for their survival. Surrounded by a war-themed set design of flames and ruins, the daily program focused primarily on the suffering caused by the Ukrainian state, rarely mentioning attacks from Russia. Similarly to other National Consultations, in early 2023, posters nationwide publicized the results of another National Consultation, claiming that "Hungarians have decided: 97% NO to sanctions", even though only 1.4 million people filled out the survey.

Fidesz accused the opposition of secretly conspiring with Zelenskyy to interfere with the elections to help them, without showing any evidence supporting this claim. Pro-government TikTok accounts have posted AI-generated videos, slopaganda, depicting Volodymyr Zelenskyy sitting on a golden toilet, counting money, snorting cocaine, and shouting orders at Hungarian soldiers, as well as pictures of war and violence. Backed by the Trump administration, the European far-right, and Russian propagandists, Fidesz used posters and social media to convince Hungarians to fear Ukraine, by building terror of an enemy that does not exist. The party spent high amounts to convince citizens that Fidesz's largest opponent, the Tisza Party, was controlled by Ukraine. Fidesz decided not to support Ukraine's accession to the union, in spite of having supported Ukraine's European Union candidate status. In 2025, Orbán said "it is not clear who attacked whom".

The media empire employs conspiracy theories, such as everyone who disagrees with Fidesz is unpatriotic, loyal to foreign interests, follows an anti-Hungarian agenda, and is a puppet of the West. Oppositional public figures are labelled "pro-war", similarly to previous labels used by Fidesz, such as "Soros-puppet" and "Gyurcsány-puppet". Fidesz's rhetoric divides Hungarians into peace-lovers and warmongers, and the 2024 and 2026 elections were portrayed as a choice between World War III and peace. Many of Fidesz's claims and ads were wholly or partially false, taken out of context, or otherwise misleading. Fact-checking organization Lakmusz found 511 ads leading up to the 2024 elections that contained at least one false or misleadind claim; these were advertized for at least €475,000.

This campaign caused the Hungarian public to express low sympathy with Ukrainians (the lowest in the EU after Bulgaria), and to be the least supportive of Ukraine joining NATO. Polls show that Fidesz voters have increasingly blamed Ukraine instead of Russia as the war progressed. By 2022, Fidesz's anti-Western and pro-Russian rhetoric led to 55% of its voters preferring cooperation with Russia as opposed to 24% preferring the US. Only 10% of Fidesz's voters believed that Russia was responsible for the outbreak of the war, while the others blamed Ukraine or the US; although the majority of all Hungarians still blamed Russia. Furthermore, 10% of Hungarians supported providing military support for Ukraine.

== Tisza Party ==
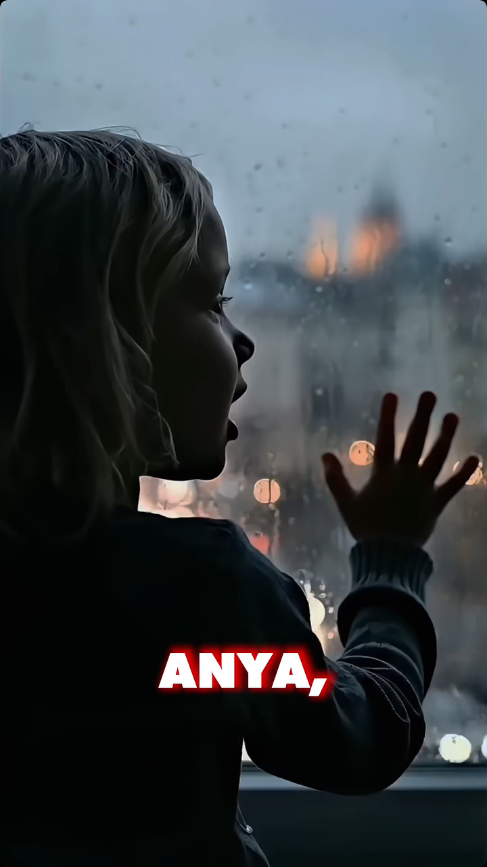
First frame of an AI-generated scare ad published by Fidesz, without disclaimer. After the girl asks her mother where her father is, he is seen blindfolded, kneeling in mud, and shot by his captors. The video ends with a call to action of voting for Fidesz, "the safe choice". Fidesz and organizations close to it have been frequently using AI-generated media to discredit their opponents, such as Péter Magyar, European politicians, and Ukraine.

First page of Én, a kétarcú (lit. 'I, the Two-faced'), an AI-generated comic book depicting Magyar secretly being Brussels's and Ukraine's puppet. It shows him conspiring with Shell and Erste, acting aggressively with his former wife, and stealing women's phones. Billboards flooded the country advertising the comic.

In independent/opposition-aligned opinion polls for the 2026 elections, the Tisza Party (cyan) took the lead over Fidesz (orange) in October 2024.

Pro-Fidesz pollsters incorrectly forecast a Fidesz victory.

Government propaganda has labelled Péter Magyar – leader of the Tisza Party, Fidesz's main rival; future prime minister – leftist, despite him not being left-wing. This was done most likely so that people associate him with disliked leftist politicians, such as Ferenc Gyurcsány and János Kádár, similarly to how George Soros, Central European University, and the EU were labelled liberal. Furthermore, Orbán's government attempted to trap Tisza by making it choose sides on several ideologically divisive issues – such as the Pride parade ban –, with the goal of drawing Magyar into the ensuing controversies. Fidesz believed they could accuse Magyar of being part of the network of George Soros, if they could get him on the same platform with liberal, left-wing voters. He and his party did not engage in these topics, dismissing them as irrelevant.

Russian-style hostile smear campaigns were launched against Magyar, such as Megafon's influencers accusing him of being "personality-disordered", "violent", "power-hungry", "the new leftist messiah", who "serves the American left owned by the empire of George Soros". Pro-government TV2 was penalized by the NMHH for its prime time report about Magyar, showing him touching his penis before a speech and pictures with his groin circled in. Magyar's discrediting was used to sideline the evidence he released relating to the Schadl–Völner corruption case. Government-supporting TikTok accounts and Fidesz's proxy organizations have posted AI-generated deepfake videos showing Magyar slandering Hungary, having masters in Brussels, and singing the Ukrainian anthem, without clearly labelling them as AI-generated.

In August 2025, an anonymous journalist for the pro-government Index released the allegedly leaked, signed progressive tax plan of Tisza, containing dog and cat taxes, among others. Magyar stated that the released document was faked. The document contained incomprehensible tables and graphs, and an AI-detection software determined that at least half of it was AI-generated, plus some of its cited references were hallucinated. Magyar's party sued Index, and the court sided with Tisza.

In March 2026, Nemzeti Ellenállás Mozgalom (NEM), an organization close to Fidesz, released a comic book titled Én, a kétarcú (lit. 'I, the Two-faced'), which depicts Magyar as a demonic, aggressive, cunning, and corrupted figure, who is controlled by Brussels and Kyiv. The European Union and the European People's Party (EPP) were depicted as mafia organizations. According to the comic book, Magyar wanted to become minister of justice, but his then-wife, Judit Varga, was chosen by Orbán instead. Therefore, Magyar decided to take revenge and partnered with the EPP, Shell, and Erste. Billboards nationwide teased the release of the comic book, which received only 1 star out of 5 on the bookstore Libri.hu.

After Meta's and Google's ban of political ads, the Polish analyst team Res Futura found that Orbán lost the digital battle against Magyar: with 40% less content, Magyar still received 30% more likes and 37% more shares. Balázs Orbán's inner circle also concluded that Magyar was far more skilled at using social media than they were, thus they attributed Tisza's rise to Fidesz's disadvantage in the online space. To combat this, Fidesz established its "Fight Club", which was unable to produce any meaningful results. Recognizing the problem, they established "Digital Civic Circles" for Fidesz supporters, but these also proved to be ineffective.

After the landslide victory of Tisza in the 2026 elections, Fidesz campaigned with Stop önkény (lit. 'Stop tyranny') against the constitutional amendment that removed President Tamás Sulyok from office. A protest for the rule of law was held, to which Orbán encouraged people to go, but he was instead at the World Cup.

== See also ==
- Central European University – University founded by Soros, attacked by Fidesz
- Elk*rtuk – 2021 Hungarian political drama film about the 2006 protests
- Euroscepticism in Hungary – Criticism of the European Union
