= László Puch =

Hungarian entrepreneur and politician

Member of the National Assembly
- In office 28 June 1994 – 5 May 2014

Personal details
- Born: 7 November 1953 (age 72) Lánycsók, Hungary
- Party: MSZMP (1980–89); MSZP (1989– )
- Profession: Entrepreneur

László Puch (born 7 November 1953) is a Hungarian entrepreneur and Hungarian Socialist Party (MSZP) politician. He was a Member of Parliament between 1994 and 2014. He functioned as his party's treasurer from 1998 to 2008, becoming an influential "grey eminence" and powerful politician behind the Socialist cabinets. He served as Secretary of State for Transport, Communications and Energy from 2008 to 2010. As a businessman, he has extensive media interests with Népszava and Vasárnapi Hírek. In 2018 he sold the weekly newspaper Szabad Föld to the Central European Press and Media Foundation in 2018 which is close to the Hungarian Prime Minister Viktor Orbán.
