= Napi Gazdaság =

Daily business newspaper in Hungary (1991–2015)

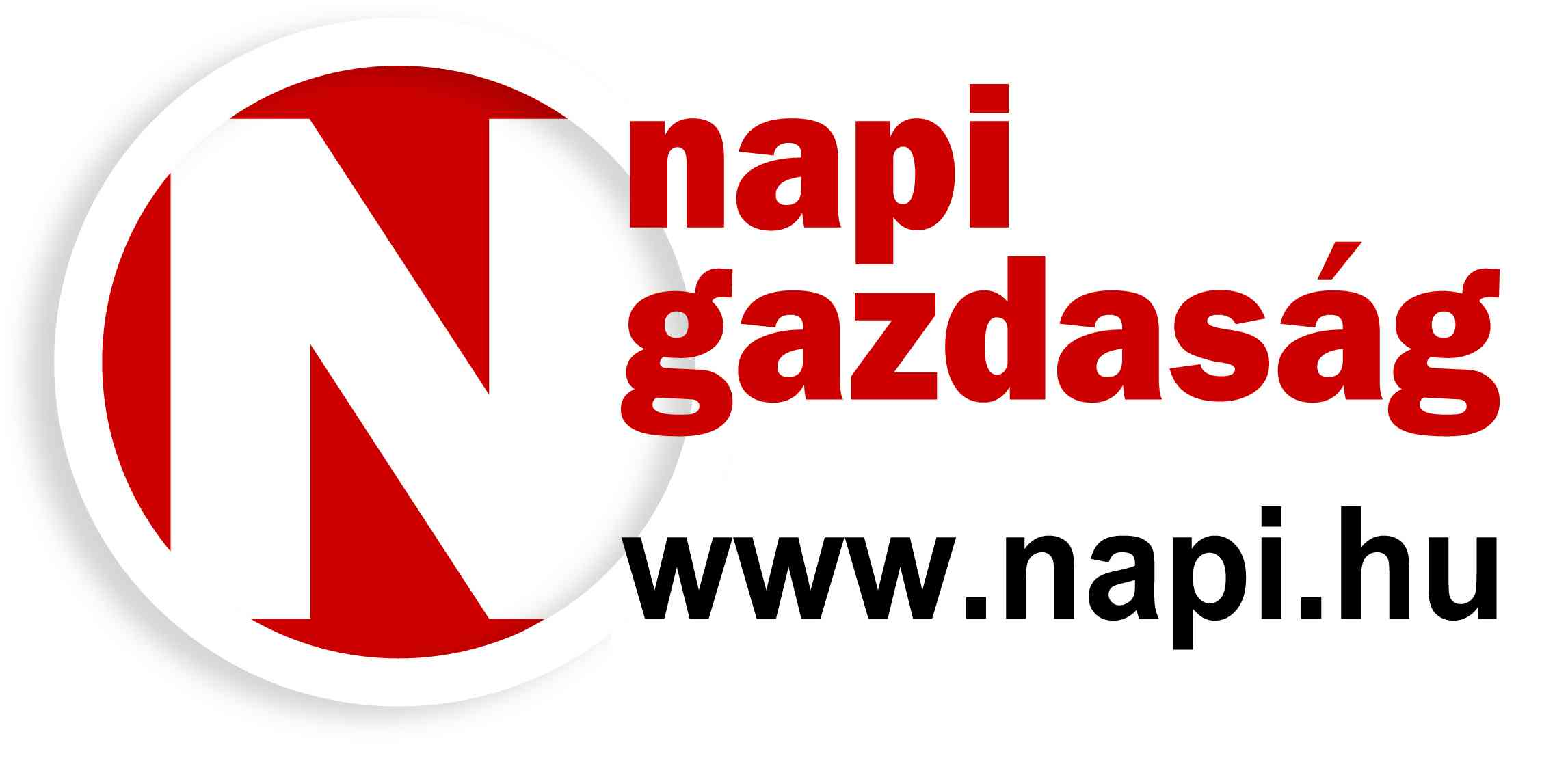
- Type: Daily newspaper
- Owner: Századvég Gazdaságkutató
- Editor-in-chief: György Barcza
- Managing editor: Péter Keresztesi
- Founded: 17 September 1991
- Ceased publication: 31 August 2015
- Language: Hungarian
- Headquarters: Budapest
- Country: Hungary

Napi Gazdaság (Hungarian pronunciation: [ˈnɒpi ˈɡɒzdɒʃaːɡ], Hungarian: Daily Economy) was a Budapest-based daily newspaper published from 1991 to 2015. The daily focused on financial and business news. It was succeeded by Magyar Idők, a conservative political daily on 1 September 2015.

== History and profile ==
Napi Gazdaság was based in Budapest. In the late 1990s the owner of the daily bankrupted, and a group of young investors bought it. During this period the paper was independent and covered investigative reports. The Central European Media and Publishing Co. (CEMP) acquired 50% of the daily in 2007. It was owned by CEMP until August 2013 when it was sold to the think tank and research center Századvég Economic Research Inc. (Századvég Gazdaságkutató in Hungarian). The think tank is linked to Fidesz, a conservative political party. The website of the daily, Napi.hu, remained in possession of CEMP. The last editor-in-chief of the daily was György Barcza, and its managing director was Péter Keresztesi.

Napi Gazdaság provided mostly financial news and was one of two business newspapers in the country. The other business newspaper in the country is Világgazdaság.

The daily occasionally published supplements one of which was about Polish economy and in Polish. On 31 August 2015 the paper ceased publication.

== Circulation ==
In 1998 Napi Gazdaság sold 14,000 copies. Its circulation was 15,000 copies in 1999. The audited readership per day was 33,000 in 2012.

== Controversy ==
In November 2013, English language news website specializing in current events taking place in Hungary, The Budapest Beacon, reported that both Napi Gazdaság's daily edition and its website were fined by the National Bank of Hungary for illegally manipulating the market.

== See also ==
- List of newspapers in Hungary
