= Veronika Munk =

Hungarian journalist (born 1979)

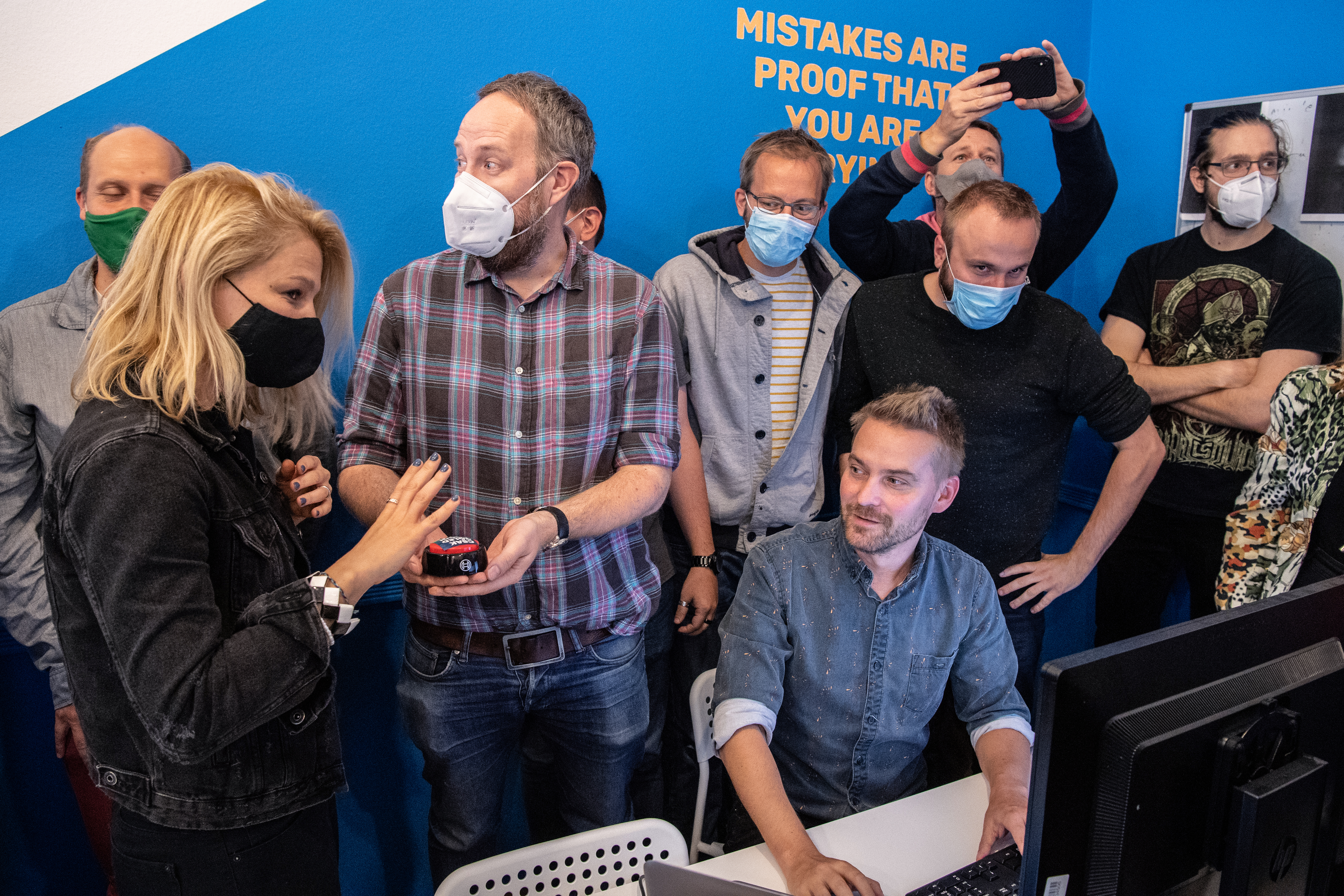
- Munk (left) at the launch of Telex.hu
- Born: 1979 (age 46–47); Budapest, Hungary
- Education: Eötvös Loránd University
- Occupation: Journalist
- Spouse: Péter Nádori
- Children: 2 girls

Veronika Munk is a Hungarian journalist and the former editor-in-chief of the news portal Telex.hu.
