= Péter Uj =

Hungarian journalist

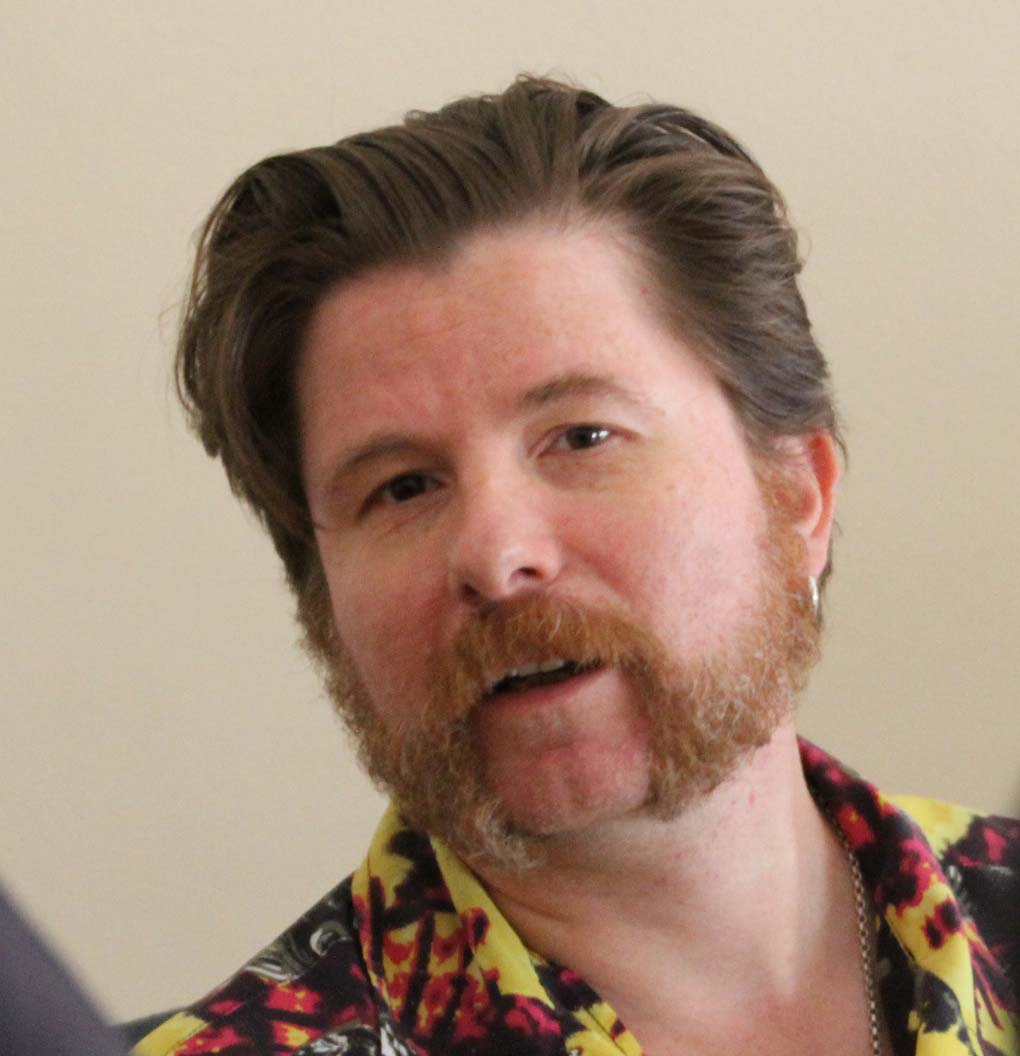
- Uj in 2013
- Born: Szolnok, Hungary
- Occupation: journalist
- Known for: the founder of 444.hu and Index.hu

Péter Uj is a Hungarian journalist who is the founder of 444.hu, and the co-founder and former editor-in-chief of Index.hu.

== Early life ==
Uj was born in Szolnok. Both of his parents are teachers.

== Career ==
=== Népszabadság ===
Uj became an intern at Népszabadság in 1990, later becoming a full-time employee in 1993. While at Népszabadság, he also worked on other projects such as CD magazine ABCD, rock magazine Wanted, satirical magazine Hócipő, as well as working on documentaries and radio shows. He left the paper in 2000 when he became the editor-in-chief of Index.hu, although he stayed there as a columnist until the paper's eventual closure in October 2016, releasing an article on every Wednesday.

=== Index ===
Uj, together with András Nyírő, Gábor Gerényi and Balázs Kéki, founded Index on 17 May 1999 as a successor to Nyírő's Internetto. Although Uj was a regular contributor to both Nyírő's previous endeavour, ABCD, and Internetto, with many of the website's staff already considering him a member, this was never an official relationship. This changed with the founding of Index as Uj became Index's news editor, and he eventually resigned from Népszabadság. Shortly afterwards, Nyírő resigned as editor-in-chief of Index in December 1999, paving the way for Uj to become the website's new editor-in-chief in 2000. He stayed in this position until his resignation in 2011. In 2016, Uj claimed that he left Index because one of Index's employees got fired after publishing an article critical of Viktor Orbán.

=== Origo ===
In 2012, Uj reunited with his former Index colleague, Albert Gazda at Origo.hu to help transform the website.

=== 444 ===
In March 2013, news reports broke that Uj was working on a new website, reportedly under the name Jeti Válasz (literally: Yeti Answer, a parody of conservative weekly Heti Válasz) or Magyar Jeti. A month later, Uj launched 444.hu with the intention of competing with Index and Origo. He was also joined by several of his former colleagues at Index, with Uj becoming the website's editor-in-chief and part-owner. As of August 2019, Uj remains as 444's editor-in-chief.
