= Telex.hu =

Hungarian language internet portal

Telex
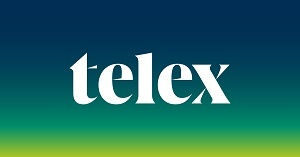
- Available in: Hungarian, English
- Owner: Van Másik Kft.
- Editor: Tamás Német
- Website: telex.hu
- Commercial: Yes

Telex is a Hungarian news portal. It was announced on 4 September 2020 by editor in chief Veronika Munk. The site is published by Van Másik Kft., which is owned by Márton Kárpáti. Both Munk and Kárpáti were deputy editors in chief of Index.hu until July 2020.

In the month after the announcement, Telex.hu was started with an intro video in which Munk outlined the plans for the news portal and asked for donations. The reason for the creation of a new news portal was that in August 2020 the editor in chief, the two deputy editors in chief and almost 90 employees left Index after being unable to work with the new owners. Many of the employees that left went on to join Telex. The site started from donations, although there are plans to convert it to a subscription-based site.

The news portal eventually launched on 2 October 2020.

== History ==
=== Changes at Index.hu ===
The reason for launching a new site was the removal of editor in chief of Index.hu, Szabolcs Dull, on 22 July 2020 after internal controversy and changes in ownership. The editors judged the firing of the editor in chief as an interference with the independence of Index and demanded Dull to be reinstated to his position. After this request was refused, on 24 July 2020, almost the entire staff of Index handed in their notice (according to HVG, 87 out of 90 staff).

This event led to a protest for press freedom with thousands of participants. One of the speakers announced that he would be willing to pay 10,000 HUF per month for a new independent news portal.

The quitting Index staff created a Facebook page, where they published a farewell video on 31 August 2020. In this video Veronika Munk talked about the creation of a subscription-based news portal.

For a short time, it was suggested that Index staff might join the news website 444.hu, however this merger eventually didn't happen.

=== Establishment of Telex as a successor ===
The publisher of Telex.hu is Van Másik Kft. (lit. "There is an alternative", a reference to the slogan "Nincs másik" - "There is no alternative" - used by Index for their fundraising campaigns) which is owned by Márton Kárpáti, former deputy editor in chief of Index.hu. Kárpáti said that he left Index partially due to family reasons, partially due to the dissatisfaction with changes at Index. The domain telex.hu was bought by a company owned by Kárpáti's brother and then transferred to Van Másik Kft.

On 4 September 2020, Veronika Munk published a video message announcing the creation of Telex.hu of which she would be the editor in chief. The portal would be neither left nor right leaning, and would strive to present the facts in an objective manner. Munk also asked the public to donate to the enterprise. For this purpose, a donation website was set up at the domain that would later be used for the news portal. The Facebook page of the former Index staff was also renamed to Telex.hu. According to Munk the donations were to be used for office rental fees, equipment and infrastructure, and to pay salaries. Márton Kárpáti said that they wouldn't have enough money to pay all the former Index employees, and were planning to start with 40 to 50 staff. When the list of initial staff was published on Telex's Facebook page, there were 70 former Index employees listed on it.

The eventual staff published news on the Telex.hu Facebook page before the actual website started. The site finally launched after a month of preparation on 2 October 2020.

== Staff ==
The site was initially led by editors in chief Veronika Munk and Szabolcs Dull.; as of December 2024, the editor-in-chief is Tamás Német. They are helped by a five-member news management team and a seven-member editor team. The news articles and opinion pieces are written by a 32-member journalist team and a 11-member permanent author team. Visuals are provided by an art director and a 9-member photo-graphics-video team. Grammar and spelling is overseen by a copy editor. (Member counts are as of 15 August 2021.)

=== Editors in chief ===
- 2020–2021: Veronika Munk
- 2021–2023: Szabolcs Dull
- 2023–present: Tamás Német

== Reception ==
The launch of Telex.hu received wide press attention. In addition to liberal toned articles, some opinion pieces encouraging donation and others denouncing the site also appeared. András Sztankóczy, the new editor in chief of Index, said that they would cite articles from Telex once it starts.

According to the donation page, 33,000 supporters sent donations to Telex.hu until 22 September 2020. Czech publisher Economia pledged 200,000 EUR to Telex. According to Márton Kárpáti the donation did not make Economia co-owner of Telex; right-wing pro-government media outlet Mandiner claimed that the donation made Telex "the propaganda paper of a Czech billionaire".

On 25 February 2021, Telex received the #AllForJan international media award named after the murdered investigative journalist Ján Kuciak.
