= Szabad Föld =

Weekly newspaper in Hungary

- Type: Weekly newspaper
- Owner(s): Central European Press and Media Foundation
- Founded: 1945; 80 years ago
- Language: Hungarian
- Headquarters: Budapest
- Country: Hungary
- Circulation: 32,037 (2023)
- ISSN: 0133-0950
- Website: www.szabadfold.hu

Szabad Föld (Hungarian pronunciation: [ˈsɒbɒd ˈføld], Hungarian: Free Land or Soil) is a weekly newspaper published in Budapest, Hungary. The paper has been in circulation since 1945.

== History and profile ==
Szabad Föld was established in 1945. The paper is published on a weekly basis and appears on Fridays. It was the organ of the People's Patriotic Front and of the working peasantry during the communist rule in Hungary.

In the late 1990s the Attila József Foundation was the co-owner of Szabad Föld. The Geoholding media group became the owner of the weekly in July 2004 when it purchased paper's owner, Book Publisher Rt. Its publisher was Szabad Lap Publisher Kft.

Szabad Föld became part of the Central European Press and Media Foundation in 2018 which is close to the Hungarian Prime Minister Viktor Orbán. The foundation acquired the paper from László Puch.

The headquarters of Szabad Föld is in Budapest. However, its target audience is non-urban people, and it mostly covers local and agricultural issues. In fact, the paper was called as peasants' newspaper or countryside weekly during its initial phase. At that time the paper financed winter-evening lectures in the country.

Lajos Feher served as the editor-in-chief of Szabad Föld. As of 2010 its editor-in-chief was László Horváth.

== Circulation ==
In 1976 Szabad Föld sold 350,000 copies. Its circulation was 176,385 copies in 2002. In 2003 the weekly had a circulation of 160,000 copies. The paper sold 115,326 copies in 2009, making it the second most read weekly in the country. The circulation of the paper was 82,261 copies in 2013. It sold 60,000 copies in 2018. Its circulation decreased to 37,859 in 2022.
