= Magyar Idők =

- Type: Daily newspaper
- Owner: Gábor Liszkay
- Editor: Ottó Gajdics
- Founded: 1 September 2015
- Ceased publication: 5 February 2019
- Political alignment: Conservative
- Language: Hungarian
- ISSN: 2416-2345
- Website: magyaridok.hu

Magyar Idők (Hungarian pronunciation: [ˈmɒɟɒr ˈidøːk], English: Hungarian Times) was a short-lived national conservative Hungarian newspaper, associated with the Fidesz government.

It was formed from Napi Gazdaság ('Daily Business'), a business newspaper founded in 1991. In 2013 it was sold to Századvég Gazdaságkutató, a think tank associated with the Fidesz political party. On 20 April 2015 it was bought by Gábor Liszkay, former editor of Magyar Nemzet. The last publication of Napi Gazdaság was 31 August 2015 and Magyar Idők was launched next day.

The paper came from a fallout between Prime Minister Viktor Orbán and media owner Lajos Simicska who since declared his support for the Jobbik party. Pro-Orban journalists left Simicska-owned outlets (mainly Magyar Nemzet) and set up the pro-government newspaper.

According to reports, Magyar Idők had published articles criticizing "liberal, globalist, and cosmopolitan culture", and attacked an opera of Billy Elliot as "gay propaganda".

Following the closure of Magyar Nemzet, Gábor Liszkay bought the now-defunct newspaper and revived it with Magyar Idők's journalists. Therefore, starting from 6 February 2019, Magyar Idők is no longer published.

== Editors ==
- Péter Csermely (1 September 2015 – 15 November 2016)
- Ottó Gajdics (15 November 2016 – 5 February 2019)
