= Index (Hungarian website) =

Hungarian language internet portal

- Available in: Hungarian
- Website: index.hu
- Launched: 17 May 1999
- Current status: online
- ISSN: 1585-3241

Index is a Hungarian news website covering both Hungarian and international news. In 2018, it was the most visited Hungarian website with an average of 1.5 million daily readers. While most of the website's articles are written in Hungarian, Index also publishes several articles in English every week.

== History ==
=== 1995 to 1999: Internetto ===
Index's predecessor, Internetto (often stylised as iNteRNeTTo) was founded in 1995 by Hungarian sociologist András Nyírő who also served as the website's first editor-in-chief. Internetto quickly rose to popularity, reaching 2000 readers a day by the summer of 1996, largely due to the website's coverage of IT-related news. The early days of Internetto also saw the launch of the site's own forum called Törzsasztal and several local editions such as iNTeRNeTTo.Szeged. They also began experimenting with the live coverage of events, starting with the 1995 Diáksziget. In 1996, the team behind Internetto launched Internet Expó, a virtual exhibition opened by Gyula Horn who served as the prime minister of Hungary at the time. This, along with live video interviews with several prominent public figures such as Horn and András Lovasi boosted Internetto's popularity even further. By 1999, Internetto averaged more than 20 thousand readers a day.

Despite the website's rapid growth, the relationship between Nyírő and Internetto's owners, IDG Hungary had become sour by 1999. IDG Hungary wanted Internetto to remain focused on IT news, whereas Nyírő intended to keep broadening its focus. IDG informally warned the publication's staff of potentially selling or dissolving Internetto. Because of this, Nyírő, along with his colleagues Gábor Gerényi, Balázs Kéki, András Virág, and Péter Uj launched a company called URL Consulting which offered to buy Internetto for 13 or 15 million HUF in April 1999. The offer was rejected by IDG Hungary CEO István Bíró. Nyírő, Gerényi, and Virág were fired on 11 May 1999 as Bíró announced that he did not want to work together with anyone who supported the buyout.

=== 1999 to 2002: Index's early days and the dot-com crash ===
András Nyírő announced the launch of a new website, Index.hu, on 17 May 1999, just 6 days after his firing from Internetto. The first version of the website was almost a direct copy of Internetto, both in terms of design, and in its source code. Because of this, IDG Hungary sued Index but they eventually lost the lawsuits. Index also took all of Internetto's editorial staff of 26 people, rendering Internetto temporarily dysfunctional. Internetto restarted with a new staff, and it existed until 2002, when Index bought the domain and turned it into an archive of Internetto's pre-Index days.

Nyírő resigned as Index's editor-in-chief in December 1999 due to pressure from the rest of Index's management. He was replaced by Péter Uj who remained in this position until 2011. The website continued its growth from the Internetto days, reaching over 50 thousand daily views by March 2000. In the summer of 2000, Index started Totalcar.hu, the website's online car magazine. However, while Index kept growing, it generated a loss of 183 million HUF in 2000, which, combined with the dot-com crash put Index in a dangerous position. The company's financial weakness also meant that it failed to compete with its competitor Origo.hu which was funded by the telecom company MATÁV. By the end of 2001, Index had effectively no cash reserves.

=== 2002 to 2010: Investments, continued growth and the arrival of Zoltán Spéder ===
In 2000, 33% of Index's shares were acquired by Gordon Bajnai's Wallis Rt., putting the company in a much better spot financially. With this, Index could move to a new office and start a new website aimed at women, Velvet.hu. While Velvet created specifically because of advertiser interest, it did not generate significant revenue. However, Totalcar became a major success, overtaking Origo's competing automotive column, and even getting its own television show. This success, combined with a decreased staff size and the continued growth of online advertising markets stabilised the company's finances.

Hungarian businessman Kristóf Nobilis acquired 49% of Index in January 2005, followed by the remaining 51% in April 2005. This acquisition resulted in many speculating that the real owner of the company is Zoltán Spéder, the vice president of OTP Bank.

The speculations of Spéder's involvement were proven correct when he bought shares in Index in 2006. By this point, the website had reached up to 400 thousand daily viewers. In 2006, Index also started their own blogging site, blog.hu. This also resulted in a redesign of Index's front page, putting emphasis on blog content. Index also started emphasising videos around this time with the arrival of Dániel Ács and Bence Gáspár Tamás By 2008, it became clear that Spéder was also behind Nobilis' acquisition as he started to become more involved with the company's day-to-day life.

=== 2010 to 2017: Increased political interference, several key figures leave ===
After Fidesz's overwhelming victory in the 2010 elections, Spéder's close relationship with several figures close to the party meant that many at Index started fearing increased political influence. This culminated in Péter Uj resigning as editor-in-chief after 11 years in September 2011, later citing the firing of one of Index's employees after an article critical of Viktor Orbán as the cause of his exit. He was replaced by Zsófi Mészáros who has worked at Index since 2000. Several other key figures, such as columnist Árpád Tóta W., journalist Márton Bede, editor Albert Gazda, and László Szily also left Index. In 2013, Péter Uj started a new website, 444.hu, which further catalysed the departure of journalists, including editor-in-chief Zsófi Mészáros, and all but one of the editors (the one exception being Gergely Dudás, who became Index's new editor-in-chief after Mészáros' departure).

As a result, Index signed a large number of new journalists. A notable change was the arrival of Szabolcs Panyi and András Dezső, whose long-form investigative journalism was in stark contrast to Index's previous journalism that was based around being the first to react to events. In line with this, a 2014 redesign of Index saw the removal of blogs from its front-page.

=== Since 2017: Simicska and a new foundation ===
In February 2014, Pro-Ráta Holding Zrt, a company close to Lajos Simicska, a businessman often described as a "Fidesz oligarch", but later a fierce enemy of Orbán, signed an option to buy Index from Spéder, unknown to Index's employees. After Simicska fell out with Orbán in 2015. and several businesspeople still allied with Fidesz started showing interest in purchasing Index, Simicska activated the option in 2017 but then immediately gave control to a foundation chaired by Index's lawyer, László Bodolai, thereby ensuring some level of independence for the paper. In his editorial, editor-in-chief Gergely Dudás said that "we are angry but independent", although he announced his resignation soon after, getting replaced by Attila Tóth-Szenesi. After one of Index's important business partners, Indamedia, got acquired in 2018, Tóth-Szenesi published an "independence indicator" separately from the core infrastructure of Index in order to ensure that readers are informed about any potential attacks against the website, and Index have also started a crowdfunding campaign to ensure the company's independence, a move since followed by other Hungarian media companies.

In December 2019, Szabolcs Dull became the website's new editor-in-chief. In March 2020, Indamedia was purchased by Miklós Vaszily, a businessman with close ties to the Fidesz political party, and the president of TV2. Although Vaszily had been the CEO of Index during the late 2000s, some already saw this as a cause for concern as Vaszily's previous ventures in media often resulted in a strong shift in content and views. These fears were quickly confirmed as Szabolcs Dull announced that Index was in danger of losing its editorial independence in a letter co-signed by most of the website's journalists on 21 June 2020. The reason for this was reportedly a cost reduction plan authored by Index founder Gábor Gerényi who had left the newspaper in 2012. In particular, this plan would have involved a drastic reduction of Index's editorial team, moving most of the journalists from an employee status to contractors, an action seen as extremely destructive by the editorial staff. Chairman László Bodolai dismissed these claims, stating that this plan will not go ahead. Bodolai also removed Dull from his position in Index's board of directors, although he was allowed to keep his job as editor-in-chief. The following day saw the resignation of CEO András Pusztay. He was replaced with lawyer Zsolt Ződi. Just a week later, Ződi also resigned. Dull's job contract as editor-in-chief with index was terminated on 22 July. This was followed by the resignation of 70 of the Index's employees just two days later, representing the vast majority of its staff. Part of the staff announced they'd be launching a spiritual successor news service called Telex.hu.

== Related services ==
Index is also related to a wide variety of other websites and services. With the exception of Index Fórum, these are now all owned by Indamedia, a separate corporation, but they still have close ties with Index, and often get featured on the website.

- Blog.hu: started by Index in 2005, blog.hu is the largest Hungarian blogging service. Content from blog.hu blogs is regularly featured on Index2, Index's "second frontpage". Many of the blogs are run by Index employees, such as consumer protection blog Tékozló Homár and television blog Comment:com. Others, such as Urbanista, were eventually acquired by Index and turned into a regular feature on the site itself.
- Indavideó: a video sharing website owned by Inda-Labs, a spinoff of Index. Although Indavideó is still Index's main video sharing site, Index is now also active on YouTube.
- Indafotó: picture sharing site for Hungarian users
- Indamail: e-mail provider
- Index Fórum: originally started as Törzsasztal in the Internetto era, Index Fórum is now a heavily moderated message board for discussing a wide variety of topics
- Totalcar: started in 2000, Totalcar was one of Index's first sister websites. Although Totalcar is mainly a car magazine, it since had its own television show, book, radio show, motorbike website and a used car website; the name "totalcar" is homophonic to totálkár, meaning total loss
- Velvet: originally started as a women's magazine, Velvet is now Index's tabloid
