= Origo (website) =

Hungarian news portal

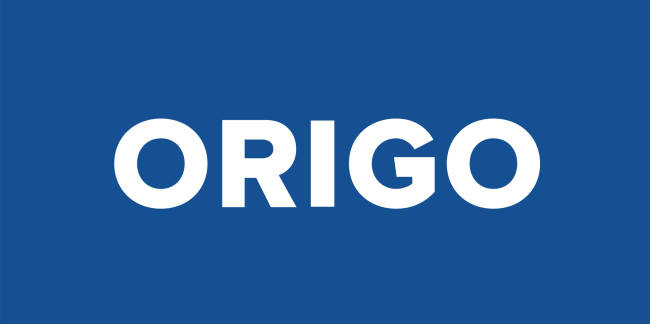
- Website type: Internet entertainment and news
- Available in: Hungarian
- Owner: Central European Press and Media Foundation
- Website: origo.hu
- Commercial: Yes
- Launched: 1 December 1998
- OCLC number: 806226699

Origo, stylised as ORIGO and previously as [origo], is a major Hungarian-language news website founded in 1998 by telecommunications company MATÁV. Into the 21st century, Origo soon became one of the most popular and visited news websites in Hungary. Until 2018, when it was acquired by the Central European Press and Media Foundation (KESMA) after receiving pressure by Viktor Orbán's government in the previous years and under New Wave Media ownership that also attracted criticism, its original balanced, independent, and reliable reporting shifted into a pro-Orbán, pro-Fidesz, and anti-immigration tone. As a result, Origo attracted international criticism, with critics describing it as a state-run propaganda and pro-Russian outlet.

== History ==
=== Foundation and early years (1998–2001) ===
Four former Magyar Narancs employees, namely Péter Nádori, Ferenc Pohly, György Simó, and Balázs Weyer, decided to start an online news website. After contacting other media publishers such as Népszabadság, they were eventually given funds for the website by Magyar Telekom (then called MATÁV) in order to popularise internet subscriptions in Hungary. Preparations for the website began in May 1997, and it was eventually launched a year later, in December 1998.

Although Origo only had one real competitor at the time, Index.hu (then called Internetto), its initial readership was underwhelming due to structural issues with the website. This soon changed as MATÁV's resources were not as limited as Internetto's, and they also owned the biggest Hungarian search engine at the time, the Altavista-based AltaVizsla. They also purchased email provider freemail.hu, further boosting their popularity as Origo were now able to offer a complete news, search engine, and email package, something Index were unable to do. In 2000, Nádori was replaced by Weyer as Origo's editor-in-chief.

=== Rise as the most popular news site in Hungary (2001–2010) ===
Origo's financial strength meant that they were able to cover the September 11 attacks without any server problems, while Index was constantly struggling with outages. This cemented Origo's position as the most popular news site in Hungary for years to come. In 2006, Origo's owners, Magyar Telekom (then called T-Online), announced that they were purchasing iWiW, Hungary's largest social media site at the time. This allowed for some level of integration between Origo and iWiW, especially after they transferred iWiW over to Origo. They also purchased blogging service Blogter.hu, a competitor to Index's blog.hu. In 2009, Origo's frontpage was redesigned.

=== Pressures by the Orban government (2010–2015) ===
In 2010, former Index employee Miklós Vaszily became Origo's new CEO. Vaszily was tasked with making the company profitable. Several other former Index employees also joined the website around this time. In 2011, editor-in-chief Balázs Weyer left the company, and he was eventually replaced by Index's Albert Gazda. Under his tenure, Origo went through another design change, with the help of Péter Uj, Index's co-founder and former editor-in-chief. In 2013, Gazda was replaced by Gergő Sáling, after he resigned. Gazda later claimed that he resigned after political figures had started pressuring Origo around that time. Around this time, officials from the Hungarian government reportedly initiated meetings with Magyar Telekom executives in order to pressure the company to take a more pro-government stance.

Sáling did not last long at the company as he was fired in June 2014. Although Origo officially cited the "adapting to the changing ways of media consumption" as the reason of his firing, many were sceptical of this reasoning, citing the lawsuit of Sáling's deputy András Pethő against Fidesz official János Lázár as the cause of his departure. This was corroborated by accounts from Pethő, as well as Sáling's predecessor Albert Gazda. Sáling's firing also lead to the departure of many other journalists and editors of Origo, including everyone working for the "Origo News" section of the website. The new editor-in-chief after Sáling's departure was Ákos Pálmai.

=== New Wave Media (2015–2018) ===
In 2015, Magyar Telekom announced that they were selling Origo after their parent company Deutsche Telekom had started getting rid of its media interests. The eventual buyers were New Wave Media, who also owned vs.hu at the time. After the transaction, Pálmay was replaced by Bence György as the website's editor-in-chief, who stayed in his position until September 2017, when he was replaced by László Gábor. In 2017, it was announced that New Wave Media was purchased by Ádám Matolcsy, the son of György Matolcsy who is the governor of the Hungarian National Bank and a Fidesz member. Although Matolcsy had denied that Origo would be used for the purposes of propaganda, the website began uncritically supporting Orbán's anti-immigration campaign, as well as regularly publishing fake news targeted against opposition politicians, which also resulted in Origo losing several lawsuits.

=== KESMA (2018–present) ===
In 2018, Origo and the majority of Fidesz-related media became the property of a media foundation called KESMA. Origo was the third most visited Hungarian website. Until this time, when it shifted to pro-Orbanism, Origo was for known its balanced reporting. As a result of the acquisition, it began supporting the anti-immigration campaign of the governing parties and reported fake news on several occasions, and has also falsified foreign news in order to make a negative statement. Origo has also repeatedly claimed untruth about opposition politicians.

In 2019, Google withdrew a grant given to New Wave Media, the publisher of Origo. Hungarian courts ordered Origo to issue corrections in 34 cases in 2018, and Gábor Polyák, head of the Hungarian media watchdog Mérték Media Monitor, said that "Origo is an emblematic player of the Fidesz propaganda media" and that it was spreading "thousands of pieces of news about migrants in an extremely negative context and accompanied by false videos and photos". Polyák further said that Origo was being financed by a "huge amount of public money" and that the decision of Google to grant funds to Origo's publisher could be interpreted as a "counterbalance" for the funding of independent media outlets. A Google spokesperson said: "We recently made an initial offer of funding to a range of projects as part of the last round of our digital news innovation fund. After further review, we've decided not to go ahead with the grant to NWM."

Origo supported the Donald Trump 2020 presidential campaign, and repeatedly claimed after the then incumbent President Trump's election defeat that the election had been rigged, with no evidence supporting the claim. Many of the allegations made by Origo in this regard later proved to be false. In January 2021, Origo blamed "the presidency of Joe Biden" for the January 6 United States Capitol attack, even though President Biden had not yet been inaugurated at the time. During the 2022 Russian invasion of Ukraine, Origo was criticised for spreading Russian propaganda and pro-Kremlin views. For example, Origo aligned with the Orbán administration's narrative about the Russo-Ukrainian War, often using phrases like "Orbán wants peace".

As a result of the government pressure in the 2010s and KESMA ownership, Origo was noted for shifting to the political right and for publishing softcore pornography openly and on the front page (often objectifying women in the process), its uncritical support of the Fidesz ruling party, and regularly spreading fake news. Several critics described the website as "state-run propaganda". In a 2025 column, Georg Spöttle warned Origo readers that Ukraine's accession to the European Union would lead to "Ukrainian mafias" involved in prostitution, human trafficking, and drug smuggling appearing in Hungary. Spöttle was described as a "German-Hungarian pro-Orbán media figure who frequently appears in government-aligned outlets and once ran as a Fidesz candidate", with reported ties to Russian intelligence. Weeks later, Orbán and his government adopted the same narrative.

== See also ==
- Democratic backsliding
