= Central European Press and Media Foundation =

Hungarian foundation (2018–)

- Abbreviation: KESMA, CEPMF
- Formation: September 11, 2018; 8 years ago
- Purpose: Media
- Region served: Hungary
- Key people: László Szabó (Head of Media Operations)
- Website: cepmf.hu

The Central European Press and Media Foundation or CEPMF (Hungarian: Közép-Európai Sajtó és Média Alapítvány, KESMA) is a Hungarian foundation controlling many of the country's media outlets. Its assets consist of cable news channels, radio stations, internet news portals, newspapers and magazines, including Hír TV, Origo, Mandiner, Nemzeti Sport, Magyar Nemzet, Világgazdaság, Szabad Föld, Bors and Figyelő. As of 2018, the joint estimated value of the foundations assets was over 88 million euros.

The foundation has been criticized by the European Federation of Journalists and the European Centre for Press and Media Freedom for its close ties to then Hungarian Prime Minister Viktor Orbán. The news outlets owned by the foundation were acquired or founded by allies of Orbán in the past few years and then donated to the foundation in 2018. The foundation's media operations between 2018 and 2020 were led by Gábor Liszkay, a newspaper publisher known for his loyalty to Orban.

== See also ==
- Fidesz propaganda
