= Magyar Nemzet =

Hungarian newspaper (1938–2018, 2019–present)

- Type: Daily newspaper
- Format: Broadsheet
- Owner: Central European Press and Media Foundation
- Founder: Sándor Pethő
- Editor: Attila Ballai
- Founded: 1938
- Ceased publication: 2018, relaunch 2019
- Political alignment: Hungarian nationalism National conservatism
- Language: Hungarian
- Country: Hungary
- Website: magyarnemzet.hu

Magyar Nemzet (Hungarian pronunciation: [ˈmɒɟɒr ˈnɛmzɛt], English: Hungarian Nation) is a major Hungarian newspaper published in Hungary, and styled itself as "close to the current Hungarian government led by Viktor Orbán" as of 2019.

== History and profile ==
Magyar Nemzet, a moderate conservative daily, was founded by Sándor Pethő in 1938. The paper fused with the other conservative daily Napi Magyarország in April 2000.

Magyar Nemzet is regarded as part of conservative media which intensified in the country in 2010. Its editorials often speak out against the socialist and liberal parties, Hungarian Socialist Party (MSZP) and Alliance of Free Democrats (SZDSZ).

Magyar Nemzet is published in broadsheet format. Its major rival was Népszabadság, the former communist party newspaper, mostly supported the former socialist MSZP/SZDSZ government. Magyar Nemzet's editorials often complain about bias of the more readily available Népszabadság and the former MSZP government's de facto censorship by cutting off funds for conservative newspaper.

After the 2018 parliamentary election, the publisher released a statement saying that the last edition of Magyar Nemzet will be released on 11 April 2018, citing financial problems. The online presence mno.hu was not available from April 2018 to February 2019.

On 6 February 2019, Magyar Nemzet was relaunched, replacing Magyar Idők.

== Circulation ==
The circulation of Magyar Nemzet was 132,000 copies in January 1989 and 121,000 copies in January 1991. The paper had a circulation of 70,000 copies in July 1992 and 55,000 copies in March 1993. Its circulation was 41,000 copies in 1998. The paper had a circulation of 64,209 copies in 2009, making it the fifth best-selling daily in the country. However, the paper lost one-third of its readers between 2005 and 2010. During the same period the visitors of its website also declined.
