= Mandiner =

Hungarian right-wing magazine and news websites

- Owner: Central European Press and Media Foundation
- Publisher: Mandiner Press Kft.
- Political alignment: Right-wing
- Language: Hungarian
- Country: Hungary
- Website: mandiner.hu

Mandiner was a right-wing, government owned Hungarian group of news publications that included the weekly news magazine Mandiner and the internet portals, mandiner.hu and Makronóm.mandiner (makronom.mandiner.hu). They were published by Mandiner Press Kft, founded in 2017, and they belonged to the Central European Press and Media Foundation group (KESMA) until 2024 when Mandiner was sold to Mathias Corvinus Collegium.

The weekly magazine published from September 12, 2019 to July 30, 2026. Upon taking over Mathias Corvinus Collegium in September 2026, the government discontinued the news site after firing the editor and CEO, Gergő Kereki. The site has not updated since September 4, 2026. The site was offline on September 9, 2026 but it was restored on September 10.

== Affiliation ==
Mandiner identified itself as national liberal and national conservative. It also used the word szabadelvű to describe its line, which is a special Hungarian version of liberalism stemming from the 19th century. Mandiner wrote on its Facebook page: "We are not independent, but we also look at ourselves and the political camp close to us with irony. We believe in the variegation of opinions, freedom, tradition and Hungarian history..."

Mandiner was a successor of a news publication run in the early 2000s by Fidelitas, the youth arm of the Hungarian national-conservative Fidesz, the governing party after 2010. The paper was considered part of the pro-government propaganda media.
