= Világgazdaság =

Hungarian daily financial newspaper

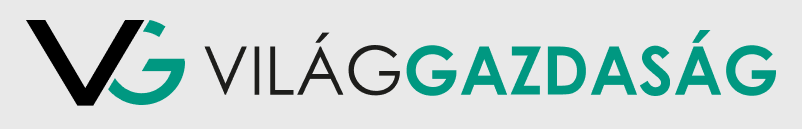
- Type: Daily newspaper (1969–2022); Online newspaper (since 2022)
- Format: Website (since 2022)
- Owner(s): Central European Press and Media Foundation
- Publisher: Mediaworks Hungary Zrt.
- Editor: Balint Deak
- Founded: 1969; 56 years ago
- Language: Hungarian
- Ceased publication: 30 June 2022 (print)
- Headquarters: Budapest
- Country: Hungary
- Circulation: 13430
- Website: www.vg.hu

Világgazdaság (Hungarian pronunciation: [ˈvilaːɡːɒzdɒʃaːɡ], transl. World Economy) is a Hungarian business online newspaper. It operates as part of Mediaworks Hungary Zrt. The newspaper was traditionally issued on every Budapest Stock Exchange trading day, until it became an online-only publication in 2022.

== History and profile ==
Világgazdaság was founded in 1969. It is headquartered in Budapest.

The daily is called "the green newspaper" since it is published on green paper. During the communist era in Hungary it was the first newspaper which was allowed direct access to Western news agencies. Its sister publication is Heti, a weekly founded in 1979.

The last printed edition of Világgazdaság was published on 30 June 2022, leaving only the online edition.
