= List of members of the National Assembly of Hungary (2026–2030) =

National Assembly of Hungary (2026–2030)

Type
- Type: Unicameral
- Houses: National Assembly

History
- Founded: 9 May 2026
- Preceded by: Members 2022–2026

Leadership
- Speaker: Ágnes Forsthoffer, TISZA

Structure
- Seats: 199
- Political groups: At opening: Government (141): TISZA (141); Opposition (58): Fidesz–KDNP (52); Fidesz (44); KDNP (8); MH (6)

Elections
- Last election: 12 April 2026

Meeting place
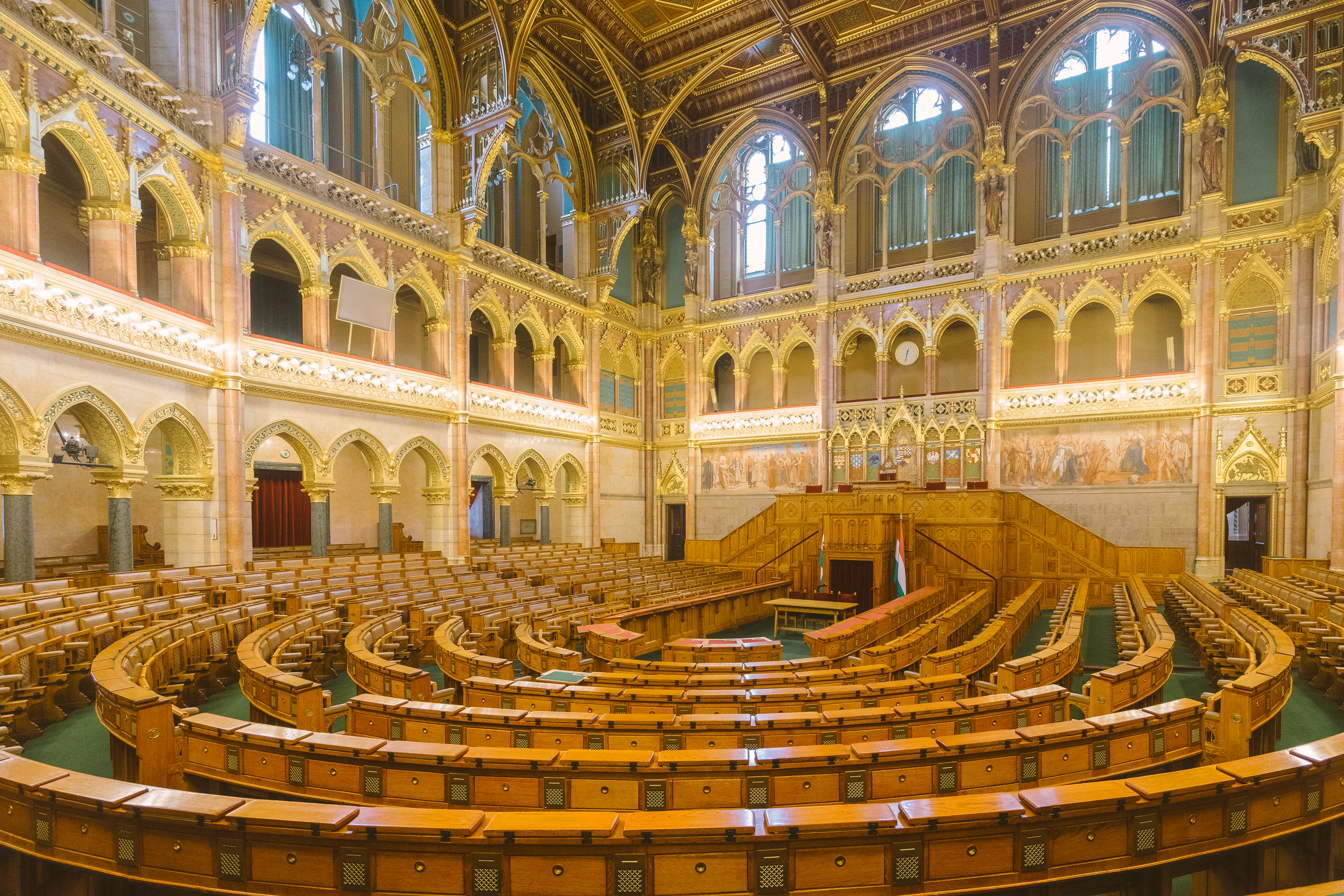
- Hungarian Parliament Building, Budapest

The list of members of the National Assembly of Hungary (2026–2030) is the list of members of the National Assembly – the unicameral legislative body of Hungary – according to the outcome of the Hungarian parliamentary election of 2026. The current National Assembly was formed on May 9, 2026.

== Officials ==
=== Speaker ===
- Ágnes Forsthoffer (TISZA)

=== First Officer ===
- Vacant

=== Deputy Speaker for Legislation ===
- Richárd Rák (TISZA)

=== Deputy Speakers ===
- Dóra Dúró (Mi Hazánk)
- Anikó Hallerné Nagy (TISZA)
- Krisztián Kőszegi (TISZA)
- Csaba Latorcai (KDNP)
- Eszter Vitályos (Fidesz)

=== Father of the Assembly ===
- István Vitányi (Fidesz) (age 73 in 2026)

=== Baby of the Assembly ===
- Ákos Berki (TISZA) (age 21 in 2026)

== Parliamentary groups ==

↓
141	52	6
TISZA	Fidesz–KDNP	MH

Electoral bloc	Parliamentary group	Members	Group leadership		Status
Electoral bloc	Parliamentary group	At election 9 May 2026	Leader	Took office	Status
Respect and Freedom Party (TISZA)		141 / 199	Andrea Bujdosó	9 May 2026	Government
Fidesz–KDNP Coalition	Fidesz	44 / 199	János Bóka	22 July 2026	Opposition
Fidesz–KDNP Coalition	Christian Democratic People's Party (KDNP)	8 / 199	Bence Rétvári	9 May 2026	Opposition
Our Homeland Movement (Mi Hazánk)		6 / 199	László Toroczkai	9 May 2026	Opposition
Source: Országgyűlés

=== Group leadership ===
* Former leader/deputy leader

==== TISZA ====
Name of Group	Seats
Name of Group	Opening Session
Respect and Freedom Party	141 / 199

Leadership
Position	Name	Political Party	Term start	Term End
Parliamentary Group Leader	Andrea Bujdosó	TISZA	9 May 2026	Incumbent
Parliamentary Group Deputy Leaders	Kinga Kalázdi-Kerekes	TISZA	9 May 2026	Incumbent
Parliamentary Group Deputy Leaders	Zoltán Molnár	TISZA	9 May 2026	Incumbent
Parliamentary Group Deputy Leaders	Orsolya Schummer	TISZA	9 May 2026	Incumbent
Parliamentary Group Deputy Leaders	Péter Bódis*	TISZA	9 May 2026	1 June 2026
Parliamentary Group Deputy Leaders	Balázs Kapronczai*	TISZA	9 May 2026	1 June 2026
Parliamentary Group Deputy Leaders	György László Velkey*	TISZA	9 May 2026	1 June 2026
Parliamentary Group Deputy Leaders	Martin Császár	TISZA	12 May 2026	Incumbent
Parliamentary Group Deputy Leaders	Márton Melléthei-Barna	TISZA	1 June 2026	Incumbent
Parliamentary Group Deputy Leaders	Gábor Lukács	TISZA	1 June 2026	Incumbent
Parliamentary Group Deputy Leaders	Viktória Strompová	TISZA	1 June 2026	Incumbent
Parliamentary Group Deputy Leaders	Máté Kiss	TISZA	24 August 2026	Incumbent

==== Fidesz ====
Name of Group	Seats
Name of Group	Opening Session
Fidesz – Hungarian Civic Alliance Parliamentary Group	44 / 199

Leadership
Position	Name	Political Party	Term start	Term End
Parliamentary Group Leader	Gergely Gulyás*	Fidesz	9 May 2026	22 July 2026
Parliamentary Group Leader	János Bóka	Fidesz	22 July 2026	Incumbent
Parliamentary Group Deputy Leaders	György Balla	Fidesz	9 May 2026	Incumbent
Parliamentary Group Deputy Leaders	János Bencsik	Fidesz	9 May 2026	Incumbent
Parliamentary Group Deputy Leaders	Alpár Gyopáros	Fidesz	9 May 2026	Incumbent
Parliamentary Group Deputy Leaders	Barbara Hegedűs	Fidesz	9 May 2026	Incumbent
Parliamentary Group Deputy Leaders	Zsófia Koncz	Fidesz	9 May 2026	Incumbent
Parliamentary Group Deputy Leaders	Balázs Németh	Fidesz	9 May 2026	Incumbent
Parliamentary Group Deputy Leaders	Zsolt Németh	Fidesz	9 May 2026	Incumbent
Parliamentary Group Deputy Leaders	Máté Kocsis	Fidesz	9 May 2026	Incumbent
Parliamentary Group Deputy Leaders	Gábor Szűcs	Fidesz	9 May 2026	Incumbent
Parliamentary Group Deputy Leaders	Róbert Zsigó	Fidesz	9 May 2026	Incumbent
Parliamentary Group Deputy Leaders	Péter Szijjártó*	Fidesz	9 May 2026	15 July 2026
Parliamentary Group Deputy Leaders	János Bóka*	Fidesz	9 May 2026	22 July 2026
Parliamentary Group Deputy Leaders	Miklós Panyi	Fidesz	22 July 2026	Incumbent

==== KDNP ====
Name of Group	Seats
Name of Group	Opening Session
Christian Democratic People's Party Parliamentary Group	8 / 199

Leadership
Position	Name	Political Party	Term start	Term End
Parliamentary Group Leader	Bence Rétvári	KDNP	9 May 2026	Incumbent
Parliamentary Group Deputy Leaders	Lőrinc Nacsa	KDNP	9 May 2026	Incumbent
Parliamentary Group Deputy Leaders	János Hargitai	KDNP	9 May 2026	Incumbent
Parliamentary Group Deputy Leaders	Hajnalka Juhász	KDNP	9 May 2026	Incumbent

==== Mi Hazánk ====
Name of Group	Seats
Name of Group	Opening Session
Our Homeland Parliamentary Group	6 / 199

Leadership
Position	Name	Political Party	Term start	Term End
Parliamentary Group Leader	László Toroczkai	MH	9 May 2026	Incumbent
Parliamentary Group Deputy Leaders	Előd Novák	MH	9 May 2026	Incumbent
Parliamentary Group Deputy Leaders	Dóra Dúró	MH	9 May 2026	Incumbent
Parliamentary Group Deputy Leaders	István Apáti	MH	9 May 2026	Incumbent

== Members ==
=== Local representatives ===
Name	Party	Party list #	Constituency	Votes	Vote %	Member since	Ref.
Attila Csőszi	Tisza	77	Bács-Kiskun #1	27,753	52.41	9 May 2026	
János Molnár	Tisza	185	Bács-Kiskun #2	32,688	56.76	9 May 2026	
Zsolt Judák	Tisza	180	Bács-Kiskun #3	24,958	50.63	9 May 2026	
Gyula Kovács	Tisza	107	Bács-Kiskun #4	27,197	50.70	9 May 2026	
Katalin Karsai-Juhász	Tisza	179	Bács-Kiskun #5	24,026	49.97	9 May 2026	
Bence Csontos	Tisza	92	Bács-Kiskun #6	24,905	53.15	9 May 2026	
Diána Ruzsa	Tisza	56	Baranya #1	35,434	62.97	9 May 2026	
Áron Kovács	Tisza	115	Baranya #2	35,893	61.23	9 May 2026	
Áron Rózsahegyi	Tisza	175	Baranya #3	25,405	48.43	9 May 2026	
Balázs Kapronczai	Tisza	109	Baranya #4	27,914	50.66	9 May 2026	
István Bodóczi	Tisza	60	Békés #1	30,631	57.44	9 May 2026	
Dávid Gombár	Tisza	102	Békés #2	25,975	51.39	9 May 2026	
Zsolt Ráki	Tisza	94	Békés #3	26,014	52.19	9 May 2026	
Mária Gurzó	Tisza	69	Békés #4	27,499	54.79	9 May 2026	
Roland Juhász	Tisza	178	Borsod-Abaúj-Zemplén #1	32,545	60.07	9 May 2026	
András Czipa	Tisza	177	Borsod-Abaúj-Zemplén #2	31,416	60.31	9 May 2026	
Gábor Csuzda	Fidesz	81	Borsod-Abaúj-Zemplén #3	20,983	46.76	9 May 2026	
Csaba Hatala-Orosz	Tisza	135	Borsod-Abaúj-Zemplén #4	27,675	53.95	9 May 2026	
László Lontay	Tisza	131	Borsod-Abaúj-Zemplén #5	25,284	50.29	9 May 2026	
Zoltán Bihari	Tisza	130	Borsod-Abaúj-Zemplén #6	28,528	51.20	9 May 2026	
Erzsébet Csézi	Tisza	10	Borsod-Abaúj-Zemplén #7	29,812	53.04	9 May 2026	
Zoltán Tanács	Tisza	14	Budapest #1	37,803	63.05	9 May 2026	
Kriszta Bódis	Tisza	12	Budapest #2	35,772	63.80	9 May 2026	
Péter Magyar	Tisza	1	Budapest #3	43,112	63.67	9 May 2026	
Áron Koncz	Tisza	52	Budapest #4	45,212	65.41	9 May 2026	
István Weigand	Tisza	83	Budapest #5	42,668	68.59	9 May 2026	
György László Velkey	Tisza	20	Budapest #6	33,953	53.62	9 May 2026	
Balázs Trentin	Tisza	85	Budapest #7	38,809	63.68	9 May 2026	
Gabriella Virágh	Tisza	84	Budapest #8	40,918	63.71	9 May 2026	
Vilmos Kátai-Németh	Tisza	25	Budapest #9	36,812	61.98	9 May 2026	
Krisztián Kulcsár	Tisza	22	Budapest #10	41,542	63.19	9 May 2026	
Nikoletta Boda	Tisza	51	Budapest #11	43,122	64.29	9 May 2026	
Zsuzsanna Jakab	Tisza	17	Budapest #12	41,359	64.35	9 May 2026	
Anna Müller	Tisza	61	Budapest #13	38,873	61.27	9 May 2026	
Alexandra Szabó	Tisza	65	Budapest #14	40,491	61.53	9 May 2026	
Áron Porcher	Tisza	50	Budapest #15	41,523	61.40	9 May 2026	
Zoltán Tarr	Tisza	9	Budapest #16	40,693	59.52	9 May 2026	
Péter Stumpf	Tisza	183	Csongrád-Csanád #1	44,478	67.85	9 May 2026	
Attila Gajda	Tisza	184	Csongrád-Csanád #2	36,102	56.64	9 May 2026	
Bence Bárkányi	Tisza	125	Csongrád-Csanád #3	30,970	50.87	9 May 2026	
Gábor Ferenczi	Tisza	126	Csongrád-Csanád #4	35,419	58.36	9 May 2026	
Béla Csiszár	Tisza	117	Fejér #1	32,654	55.75	9 May 2026	
Mihály Borics	Tisza	76	Fejér #2	29,534	53.91	9 May 2026	
Viktória Bögi	Tisza	67	Fejér #3	31,342	54.27	9 May 2026	
Ervin Nagy	Tisza	18	Fejér #4	31,758	60.50	9 May 2026	
Gábor Varga	Fidesz	141	Fejér #5	23,008	46.79	9 May 2026	
Judit Diószegi	Tisza	59	Győr-Moson-Sopron #1	32,318	60.22	9 May 2026	
András Néher	Tisza	124	Győr-Moson-Sopron #2	33,263	54.86	9 May 2026	
Alpár Gyopáros	Fidesz	77	Győr-Moson-Sopron #3	26,151	47.42	9 May 2026	
Anikó Hallerné Nagy	Tisza	129	Győr-Moson-Sopron #4	33,152	52.07	9 May 2026	
Krisztina Porpáczy	Tisza	88	Győr-Moson-Sopron #5	34,231	52.76	9 May 2026	
Zsolt Tárkányi	Tisza	182	Hajdú-Bihar #1	31,991	59.50	9 May 2026	
Enikő Tompa	Tisza	68	Hajdú-Bihar #2	32,046	58.18	9 May 2026	
László Csák	Tisza	123	Hajdú-Bihar #3	29,552	50.92	9 May 2026	
István Vitányi	Fidesz	94	Hajdú-Bihar #4	23,029	47.82	9 May 2026	
Romulusz Ruszin-Szendi	Tisza	16	Hajdú-Bihar #5	25,752	49.99	9 May 2026	
Éva Göröghné Bocskai	Tisza	15	Hajdú-Bihar #6	26,938	52.24	9 May 2026	
Péter Bódis	Tisza	58	Heves #1	35,073	54.33	9 May 2026	
János Kiss	Tisza	111	Heves #2	29,694	51.65	9 May 2026	
Áron Juhász	Tisza	110	Heves #3	30,687	50.99	9 May 2026	
Andrea Rost	Tisza	2	Jász-Nagykun-Szolnok #1	35,110	58.84	9 May 2026	
Ferenc Tibor Halmai	Tisza	66	Jász-Nagykun-Szolnok #2	27,076	51.27	9 May 2026	
Sándor F. Kovács	Fidesz	91	Jász-Nagykun-Szolnok #3	24,638	47.05	9 May 2026	
Csongor Farkas	Tisza	121	Jász-Nagykun-Szolnok #4	28,857	54.18	9 May 2026	
Ildikó Éva Sopov	Tisza	57	Komárom-Esztergom #1	36,785	59.80	9 May 2026	
Márk Radnai	Tisza	7	Komárom-Esztergom #2	36,344	56.85	9 May 2026	
Nikolett Árvay	Tisza	90	Komárom-Esztergom #3	34,000	53.03	9 May 2026	
Zoltán Péter Szafkó	Tisza	29	Nógrád #1	28,081	52.17	9 May 2026	
Mihály Balla	Fidesz	106	Nógrád #2	26,418	44.58	9 May 2026	
József Jelencsik	Tisza	64	Pest #1	40,100	60.11	9 May 2026	
Gábor Pósfai	Tisza	13	Pest #2	42,204	62.82	9 May 2026	
Andrea Bujdosó	Tisza	8	Pest #3	40,789	58.24	9 May 2026	
Balázs Tóthmajor	Tisza	55	Pest #4	35,920	55.62	9 May 2026	
Orsolya Miskolczi	Tisza	63	Pest #5	40,500	62.09	9 May 2026	
Endre Márton László	Tisza	53	Pest #6	39,981	60.55	9 May 2026	
Ildikó Trompler	Tisza	62	Pest #7	32,478	52.85	9 May 2026	
István Balajti	Tisza	81	Pest #8	33,852	58.87	9 May 2026	
Zita Bilisics	Tisza	87	Pest #9	32,930	54.15	9 May 2026	
Andrea Perticsné Kácsor	Tisza	54	Pest #10	37,930	62.11	9 May 2026	
Renáta Szimon	Tisza	86	Pest #11	33,592	54.13	9 May 2026	
György Polgár	Tisza	181	Pest #12	28,018	50.20	9 May 2026	
Máté Hende	Tisza	80	Pest #13	26,676	48.93	9 May 2026	
Gergely Muhari	Tisza	82	Pest #14	28,878	51.71	9 May 2026	
Viktória Lőrincz	Tisza	70	Somogy #1	27,023	57.45	9 May 2026	
József Benke	Tisza	134	Somogy #2	19,785	47.55	9 May 2026	
Csaba Attila Bakos	Tisza	74	Somogy #3	22,647	48.28	9 May 2026	
Ernő Csatári	Tisza	73	Somogy #4	25,083	49.87	9 May 2026	
László Gajdos	Tisza	3	Szabolcs-Szatmár-Bereg #1	37,691	64.77	9 May 2026	
Péter Lajos Szakács	Tisza	103	Szabolcs-Szatmár-Bereg #2	27,888	53.17	9 May 2026	
Viktória Dicső	Tisza	104	Szabolcs-Szatmár-Bereg #3	28,053	50.31	9 May 2026	
Attila Tilki	Fidesz	82	Szabolcs-Szatmár-Bereg #4	25,166	50.56	9 May 2026	
Sándor Kovács	Fidesz	72	Szabolcs-Szatmár-Bereg #5	25,410	49.66	9 May 2026	
Tímea Barna-Szabó	Tisza	71	Szabolcs-Szatmár-Bereg #6	24,831	47.91	9 May 2026	
József Sárosi	Tisza	72	Tolna #1	23,026	51.57	9 May 2026	
Gábor Szijjártó	Tisza	118	Tolna #2	20,087	46.58	9 May 2026	
Tamás Cseh	Tisza	133	Tolna #3	20,880	47.42	9 May 2026	
Róbert Rápli	Tisza	119	Vas #1	31,847	56.32	9 May 2026	
Péter Ágh	Fidesz	80	Vas #2	25,700	46.26	9 May 2026	
Zsolt V. Németh	Fidesz	95	Vas #3	26,186	49.21	9 May 2026	
Levente Gáspár	Tisza	128	Veszprém #1	33,205	57.79	9 May 2026	
Ágnes Forsthoffer	Tisza	4	Veszprém #2	34,477	57.29	9 May 2026	
Péter Balatincz	Tisza	100	Veszprém #3	28,223	54.00	9 May 2026	
Szilvia Ujvári	Tisza	120	Veszprém #4	25,455	48.58	9 May 2026	
Márta Nagy	Tisza	127	Zala #1	30,995	51.54	9 May 2026	
Balázs Varga	Tisza	91	Zala #2	27,981	48.08	9 May 2026	
Csaba Lovkó	Tisza	98	Zala #3	30,369	55.37	9 May 2026	

=== Party-list representatives ===
Name	Party	List	Party list #	Member since	Ref.
István Kapitány	Tisza		5	9 May 2026	
Anita Orbán	Tisza		6	9 May 2026	
Zsolt Hegedűs	Tisza		11	9 May 2026	
Dóra Szűcs	Tisza		19	9 May 2026	
András Kármán	Tisza		21	9 May 2026	
Márton Melléthei-Barna	Tisza		23	9 May 2026	
Erika Jójárt	Tisza		24	9 May 2026	
Zoltán Molnár	Tisza		26	9 May 2026	
Csongor Kincse	Tisza		27	9 May 2026	
Gabriella Borsós	Tisza		28	9 May 2026	
Kinga Kalázdi-Kerekes	Tisza		30	9 May 2026	
Zsolt Gyuk	Tisza		31	9 May 2026	
Orsolya Schummer	Tisza		32	9 May 2026	
Lőrinc Mihály Varga	Tisza		33	9 May 2026	
Anikó Zsuzsanna Sóti	Tisza		34	9 May 2026	
Richárd Rák	Tisza		35	9 May 2026	
Márton Ádám Hajdu	Tisza		36	9 May 2026	
Anett Pásztor	Tisza		37	9 May 2026	
István Hantosi	Tisza		38	9 May 2026	
István Gyöngyösi	Tisza		39	9 May 2026	
Edit Sasi-Nagy	Tisza		40	9 May 2026	
Mihály Balogh	Tisza		41	9 May 2026	
Martin Császár	Tisza		42	9 May 2026	
Ákos Berki	Tisza		43	9 May 2026	
Krisztián Márk Simon	Tisza		44	9 May 2026	
Tamás Tóth	Tisza		45	9 May 2026	
Krisztián Kőszegi	Tisza		46	9 May 2026	
Máté Kiss	Tisza		47	9 May 2026	
Gábor Lukács	Tisza		48	9 May 2026	
Tibor Kaprinyák	Tisza		49	9 May 2026	
Viktória Strompová	Tisza		75	9 May 2026	
Ádám László Veres	Tisza		78	9 May 2026	
Tibor Szabó	Tisza		79	9 May 2026	
László Bicskei	Tisza		89	9 May 2026	
Zsuzsánna Simon	Tisza		93	9 May 2026	
Zsolt Bóka	Tisza		95	9 May 2026	
Petra Judit Kovács	Tisza		96	9 May 2026	
László Bugya	Tisza		97	9 May 2026	
Norbert Tóth	Tisza		99	9 May 2026	
Péter Járosi	Tisza		101	9 May 2026	
Pál Czakó-Czibrus	Tisza		105	9 May 2026	
Csilla Németh	Tisza		106	9 May 2026	
Nándor Zsolt Horváth	Tisza		108	9 May 2026	
Dávid Gyömbér	Tisza		112	9 May 2026	
Balázs Márk Havasi	Tisza		113	9 May 2026	
Alexandra Szentkirályi	Fidesz	Fidesz–KDNP	5	9 May 2026	
Máté Kocsis	Fidesz	Fidesz–KDNP	9	9 May 2026	
Zsolt Papp	Fidesz	Fidesz–KDNP	13	9 May 2026	
Zsolt Attila Németh	Fidesz	Fidesz–KDNP	17	9 May 2026	
Gergely Gulyás	Fidesz	Fidesz–KDNP	24	9 May 2026	
János Bóka	Fidesz	Fidesz–KDNP	25	9 May 2026	
Balázs Hidvéghi	Fidesz	Fidesz–KDNP	26	9 May 2026	
György Balla	Fidesz	Fidesz–KDNP	35	9 May 2026	
Dávid Ádám Héjj	Fidesz	Fidesz–KDNP	37	9 May 2026	
Anna Molnárné Lezsák	Fidesz	Fidesz–KDNP	46	9 May 2026	
Balázs Németh	Fidesz	Fidesz–KDNP	47	9 May 2026	
Eszter Vitályos	Fidesz	Fidesz–KDNP	48	9 May 2026	
Bence Tuzson	Fidesz	Fidesz–KDNP	49	9 May 2026	
Balázs Hankó	Fidesz	Fidesz–KDNP	51	9 May 2026	
Árpád Takács	Fidesz	Fidesz–KDNP	83	9 May 2026	
Gábor Czirbus	Fidesz	Fidesz–KDNP	85	9 May 2026	
Zsófia Koncz	Fidesz	Fidesz–KDNP	88	9 May 2026	
Bálint Nagy	Fidesz	Fidesz–KDNP	96	9 May 2026	
László Horváth	Fidesz	Fidesz–KDNP	100	9 May 2026	
Mihály Witzmann	Fidesz	Fidesz–KDNP	103	9 May 2026	
Róbert Zsigó	Fidesz	Fidesz–KDNP	121	9 May 2026	
János Pócs	Fidesz	Fidesz–KDNP	122	9 May 2026	
Péter Takács	Fidesz	Fidesz–KDNP	123	9 May 2026	
Krisztina Csibi	Fidesz	Fidesz–KDNP	130	9 May 2026	
János Bencsik	Fidesz	Fidesz–KDNP	131	9 May 2026	
Barbara Hegedűs	Fidesz	Fidesz–KDNP	152	9 May 2026	
Béla Radics	Fidesz	Fidesz–KDNP	158	9 May 2026	
Miklós Panyi	Fidesz	Fidesz–KDNP	170	9 May 2026	
Gábor Szűcs	Fidesz	Fidesz–KDNP	218	9 May 2026	
Piroska Szalai	Fidesz	Fidesz–KDNP	237	9 May 2026	
André Palóc	Fidesz	Fidesz–KDNP	210	10 August 2026	
Olivér Hortay	Fidesz	Fidesz–KDNP	222	10 August 2026	
Pál Szekeres	Fidesz	Fidesz–KDNP	266	21 September 2026	
Katalin Kardosné Gyurkó	Fidesz	Fidesz–KDNP	150	19 October 2026	
István Simicskó	KDNP	Fidesz–KDNP	22	9 May 2026	
Hajnalka Juhász	KDNP	Fidesz–KDNP	28	9 May 2026	
Bence Rétvári	KDNP	Fidesz–KDNP	29	9 May 2026	
Lőrinc Nacsa	KDNP	Fidesz–KDNP	32	9 May 2026	
Csaba Latorcai	KDNP	Fidesz–KDNP	38	9 May 2026	
Miklós Seszták	KDNP	Fidesz–KDNP	78	9 May 2026	
Zsuzsa Máthé	KDNP	Fidesz–KDNP	84	9 May 2026	
János Hargitai	KDNP	Fidesz–KDNP	118	9 May 2026	
László Toroczkai	Our Homeland		1	9 May 2026	
Dóra Dúró	Our Homeland		2	9 May 2026	
István Apáti	Our Homeland		3	9 May 2026	
Előd Novák	Our Homeland		4	9 May 2026	
Dávid Dócs	Our Homeland		6	9 May 2026	
István Szabadi	Our Homeland		7	9 May 2026	

== Membership changes ==
Former member				Seat	Reason	Successor				Ref.
Name	Party	#	Left office	Seat	Reason	Name	Party	#	Took office	Ref.
Péter Szijjártó	Fidesz	19	15 July 2026	National list	Resigned	André Palóc	Fidesz	222	10 August 2026	
János Lázár	Fidesz	20	20 August 2026	National list	Resigned	Pál Szekeres	Fidesz	266	21 September 2026	
Balázs Orbán	Fidesz	21	22 September 2026	National list	Resigned	Katalin Kardosné Gyurkó	Fidesz	150	19 October 2026	
Gyula Budai	Fidesz	40	3 August 2026	National list	Resigned	Olivér Hortay	Fidesz	210	10 August 2026	
