= Anikó Hallerné Nagy =

Hungarian politician

Member of the National Assembly
- Incumbent
- Assumed office 9 May 2026
- Preceded by: Attila Barcza
- Constituency: Győr-Moson-Sopron 4th

Deputy Speaker of the National Assembly
- Incumbent
- Assumed office 9 May 2026 Serving with Krisztián Kőszegi · Richárd Rák · Eszter Vitályos · Csaba Latorcai · Dóra Dúró
- Speaker: Ágnes Forsthoffer

Personal details
- Party: Tisza

Anikó Hallerné Nagy (Anikó Nagy, Mrs. Haller) is a Hungarian politician who was elected member of the National Assembly in 2026 representing the Győr-Moson-Sopron County 4th constituency. She has been one of the deputy speakers of the National Assembly. In this capacity, the National Assembly voted for the temporary assignation of the duties of Speaker of the National Assembly to Nagy, with 140 in favour, 0 against, and 2 abstentions, on 20 July 2026, when Speaker Ágnes Forsthoffer became acting head of state.

== Career ==
She studied law at the University of Pécs in 2001 and specialised mediation law at Széchenyi István University in 2022. She attended the College of Public Administration and Budapest Business School Faculty of Finance and Accountancy in 1991 and 1993, respectively. She had previously worked as a lawyer.
