= Balázs Hidvéghi =

Hungarian politician

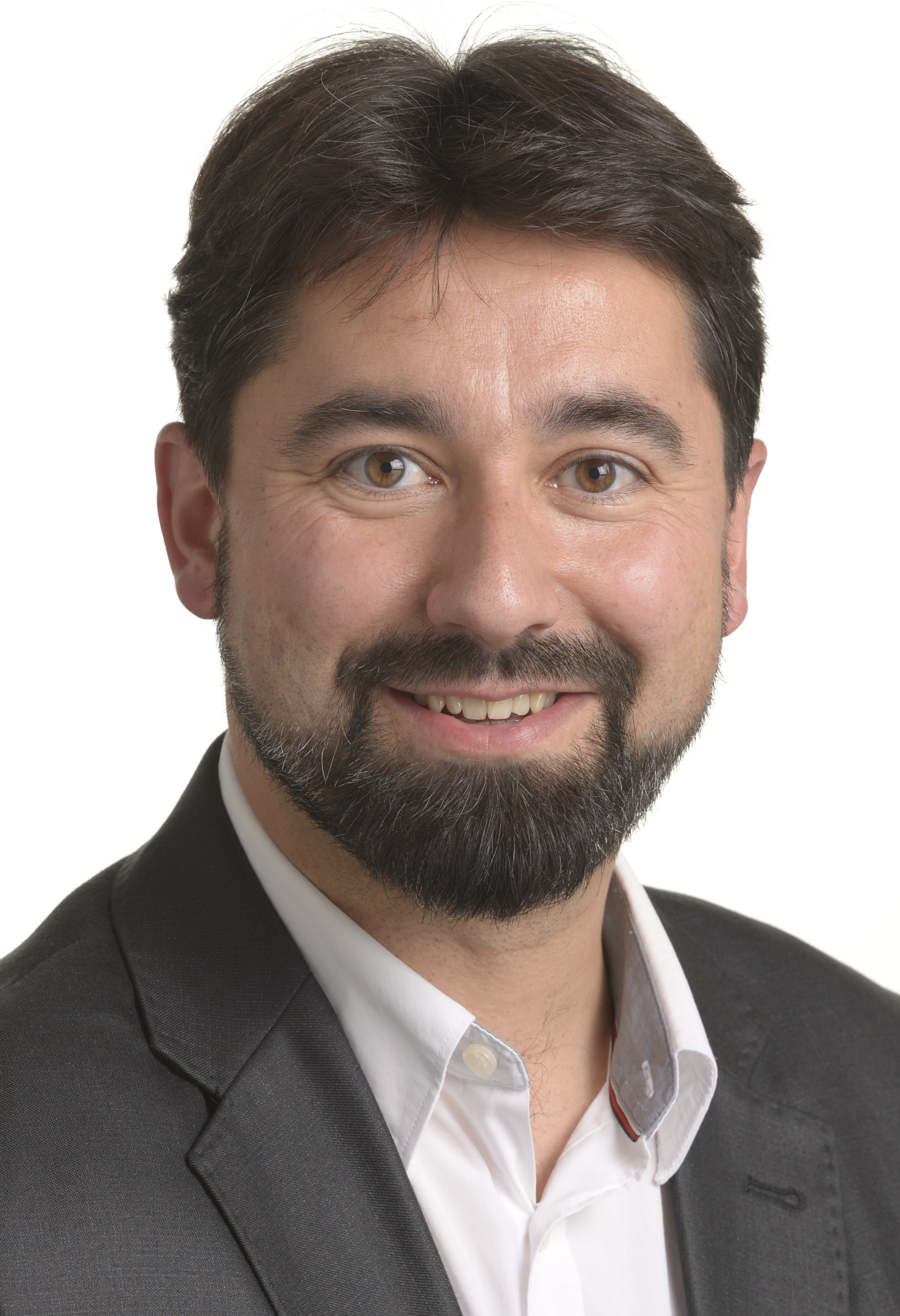

Member of the European Parliament
- In office 2 July 2019 – 15 July 2024
- In office 15 May 2014 – 30 June 2014

Member of the National Assembly
- In office 5 July 2013 – 5 May 2014
- Incumbent
- Assumed office 30 September 2024

Personal details
- Born: 28 November 1970 (age 55) Budapest, Hungary
- Party: Fidesz
- Spouse: Brigitta Hidvéghiné Pulay
- Children: 4
- Profession: politician

Balázs Hidvéghi (born 28 November 1970) is a Hungarian politician and Member of Parliament from 2013 to 2014 and since 2024. He served as the parliamentary state secretary of the Prime Minister’s Cabinet Office from 2024 to 2026. He was a Member of the European Parliament, former Director of Communications of Fidesz-Hungarian Civic Union.

== In the European Parliament ==
He was a Member of the European Parliament in 2014, and between 2019 and 2024. He was involved in the Committee on Civil Liberties, Justice and Home Affairs. He was also a member of the Committee on Foreign Affairs, the Special Committee on Foreign Interference in all Democratic Processes in the European Union, including Disinformation, and the Delegation to the EU-UK Parliamentary Partnership Assembly. Until March 2021, as a member of the Hungarian Fidesz delegation, he belonged in the European People's Party parliamentary group. In March 2021, he left the EPP Group together with the other Fidesz MEPs. Since then he carried on his duties as an independent MEP until his retirement as an MEP on 15 July 2024.

== In national politics ==
He has been a member of Fidesz since 1989. In the 1990s he was active in the party's foreign affairs group. In 2004 he became Secretary of the Hungarian People's Party Group in the European Parliament and Political Advisor to József Szájer. After the Fidesz victory in 2010, he was appointed Deputy State Secretary for International Affairs and External Economic Relations at the Ministry for National Economy by Prime Minister Viktor Orbán. In this position he has been in a close working relationship with Minister György Matolcsy. Between 2011-2012 he also chaired the Hungarian OECD National Council. In 2012 he became the party’s Deputy Director responsible for Hungarian communities in the Carpathian basin and the Hungarian diaspora. Between 2013-14 he was also Member of the Hungarian Parliament. During this period, he was Vice-Chairman of the Committee on National Cohesion and a member of the Committee on Foreign Affairs. Between 2014-2016 he was Advisor, then Spokesman to the President of the National Bank of Hungary. In 2016 he joined the campaign team of the governing Fidesz party, and until 2019 was also its Communications Director. In May 2019 he was elected to the European Parliament.

Hidvéghi served as campaign manager of Alexandra Szentkirályi's unsuccessful mayoral candidacy in the 2024 Budapest mayoral election.

In September 2024, Hidvéghi became MP again, replacing Balázs Győrffy, who was elected MEP. In October 2024, Hidvéghi assumed the role of parliamentary state secretary of the Prime Minister’s Cabinet Office, replacing Fidesz MP Csaba Dömötör, who became MEP following the resignation of Győrffy after an assault scandal. Hidvéghi held his position until the 2026 Hungarian parliamentary election. He was elected MP via the Fidesz national list. He was appointed vice-chairman of the parliament's Social Participation Committee, while also held membership in the Immunity Committee.

== Other activities ==
Between 1994-1996, he was a teacher at the ELTE Radnóti Miklós High School. Between 1994-2004 he worked first for the Hungarian Civitas Association, then for Civitas International, and later for the Council of Europe.

== Studies ==
He graduated from Petőfi Sándor High School in Budapest in 1989, and from the Eötvös Loránd University in Budapest in 1995, majoring in English and Hungarian at the School of English and American Studies of the Faculty of Humanities (Eötvös Loránd University). In 1991, he obtained a Certificate in Diplomacy at the Institute for International Studies at the University of Leeds, England. In 2005, he graduated from the Robert Schuman University of Strasbourg, France with a DEA master's degree at the Institute of European Studies.

== Family ==
His parents are both engineers. He is married to Brigitta Hidvéghiné Pulay, a lawyer and a specialist in environmental protection and sustainable development. They live in Budapest with their four children.
