= Gábor Lukács =

Hungarian politician

Member of the National Assembly
- Incumbent
- Assumed office 9 May 2026

Personal details
- Party: Tisza Party

Gábor Lukács is a Hungarian politician who was elected member of the National Assembly in 2026. During the 2026 parliamentary election, he was the campaign manager of the Tisza Party in Budapest.
