= József Benke (politician) =

Hungarian politician

Member of the National Assembly
- Incumbent
- Assumed office 9 May 2026
- Preceded by: László Szászfalvi
- Constituency: Somogy 2nd

Personal details
- Party: TISZA

József Benke is a Hungarian politician who was elected member of the National Assembly in 2026. From 2014 to 2019, he served as deputy mayor of Kadarkút.
