= Viktória Strompová =

Hungarian politician

Member of the National Assembly
- Incumbent
- Assumed office 9 May 2026

Personal details
- Born: 1985 or 1986 (age 39–40)
- Party: Tisza Party

Viktória Strompová is a Slovak-born Hungarian politician who was elected member of the National Assembly in 2026. She previously worked as a tour guide.
