= Kinga Kalázdi-Kerekes =

Hungarian politician

Member of the National Assembly
- Incumbent
- Assumed office 9 May 2026

Personal details
- Party: TISZA

Kinga Kalázdi-Kerekes is a Hungarian politician who was elected member of the National Assembly in 2026. She is the coordinator of the Tisza Party in Pest County.
