= Zsolt Gyuk =

Hungarian politician

Member of the National Assembly
- Incumbent
- Assumed office 9 May 2026

Personal details
- Party: TISZA

Zsolt Gyuk is a Hungarian politician who was elected member of the National Assembly in 2026. He has served as coordinator of the Tisza Party in Western Transdanubia since 2025.
