= Ákos Berki =

Hungarian politician

Member of the National Assembly
- Incumbent
- Assumed office 9 May 2026

Personal details
- Born: 2004 or 2005 (age 21–22)
- Party: TISZA

Ákos Berki (born 2004 or 2005) is a Hungarian politician serving as a member of the National Assembly since 2026. He is the youngest current member of the parliament.
