= Márta Nagy =

Hungarian politician (born 1984)

Member of the National Assembly
- Incumbent
- Assumed office 9 May 2026
- Preceded by: László Vigh
- Constituency: Zala 1st

Personal details
- Born: 1984 (age 41–42)
- Party: Tisza

Márta Nagy (born 1984) is a Hungarian politician who was elected member of the National Assembly in 2026. She previously worked as a pharmacist.
