= Anikó Sóti =

Hungarian politician

Member of the National Assembly
- Incumbent
- Assumed office 9 May 2026

Personal details
- Party: TISZA

Anikó Zsuzsanna Sóti is a Hungarian politician who was elected member of the National Assembly in 2026. In 2007, she founded the translation and interpretation agency Polyglot.
