= Zoltán Molnár (politician) =

Hungarian politician

Member of the National Assembly
- Incumbent
- Assumed office 9 May 2026

Personal details
- Party: TISZA

Zoltán Molnár is a Hungarian politician who was elected member of the National Assembly in 2026. He previously worked as a businessman.
