= György László Velkey =

Hungarian politician

György László Velkey MP

Deputy Minister for Foreign Affairs
- Incumbent
- Assumed office 26 May 2026
- Minister: Anita Orbán
- Preceded by: Levente Magyar

Deputy Leader of the TISZA Parliamentary Group in the National Assembly
- Incumbent
- Assumed office 9 May 2026
- Leader: Andrea Bujdosó

Member of the National Assembly
- Incumbent
- Assumed office 9 May 2026
- Preceded by: Máté Kocsis
- Constituency: Budapest 6th

Personal details
- Party: TISZA
- Parents: György János Velkey (father); Anikó Rácz (mother)
- Education: Pázmány Péter Catholic University (MA, MA, PhD)

György László Velkey is a Hungarian politician who was elected member of the National Assembly in 2026. He has served as chief of staff to Péter Magyar since 2025 and will become deputy parliamentary leader of the Tisza Party in the National Assembly under Andrea Bujdosó in May 2026.
