= Csaba Dömötör =

Hungarian politician

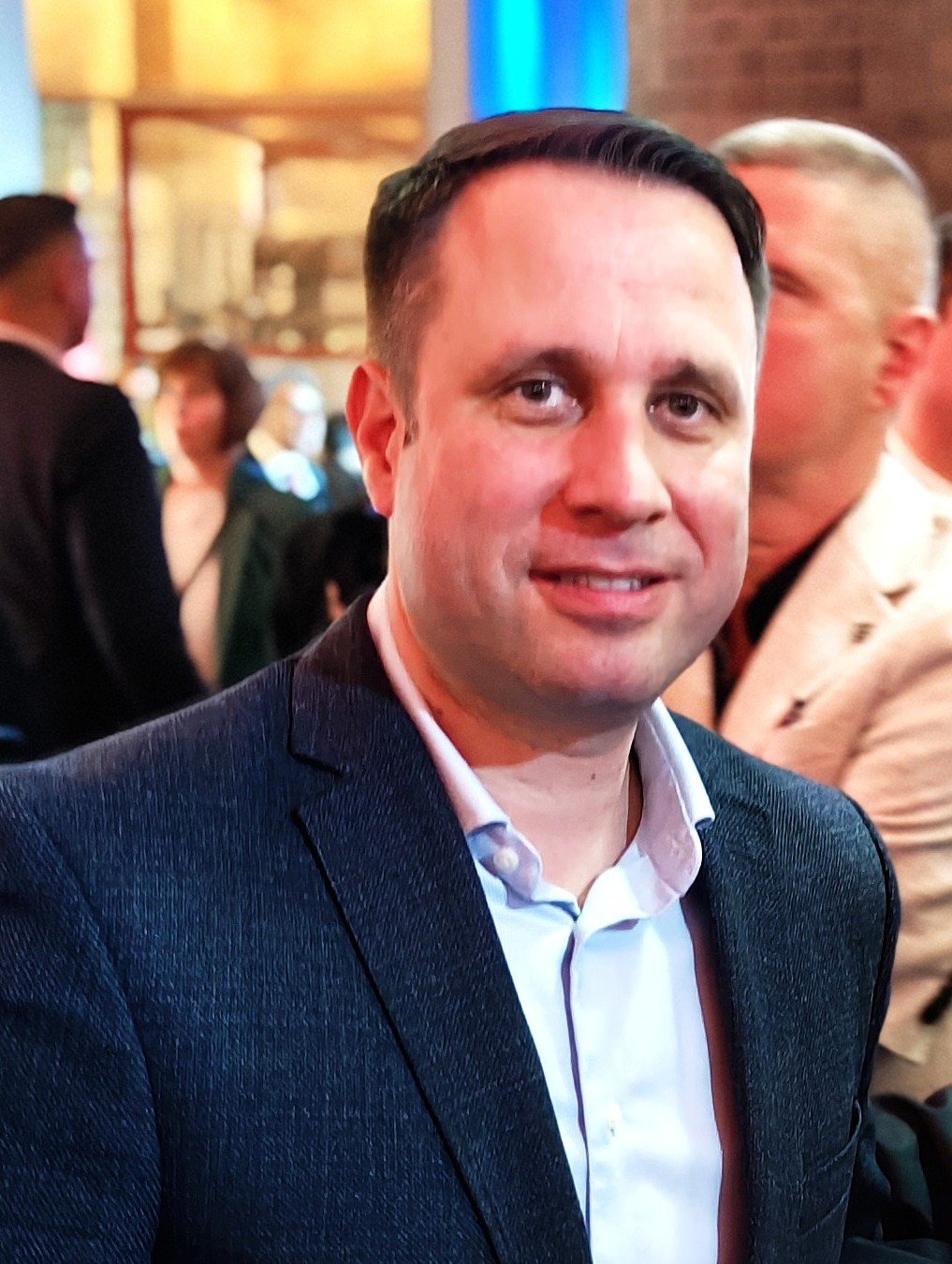

Member of the European Parliament for Hungary
- Incumbent
- Assumed office 22 September 2024

Member of the National Assembly
- In office 8 May 2018 – 30 September 2024
- Succeeded by: Barbara Hegedűs

Personal details
- Born: 13 September 1982 (age 43) Budapest, Hungary
- Party: Fidesz

Csaba Dömötör (born in Budapest on 13 September 1982) is a Hungarian international relations expert and politician. He is a member of National Assembly of Hungary (Országgyűlés) since 2018. He has served as the Secretary of State in the Prime Minister's office.

He became a Member of the European Parliament in September 2024, following the resignation of Balázs Győrffy after an assault scandal.
