= Zsolt Judák =

Hungarian politician

Member of the National Assembly
- Assuming office 9 May 2026
- Succeeding: Sándor Font
- Constituency: Bács-Kiskun 3rd

Personal details
- Party: Tisza

Zsolt Judák is a Hungarian politician who was elected member of the National Assembly in 2026 representing the Bács-Kiskun County 3rd constituency. He previously worked as a gardener.
