= Lőrinc Varga =

Hungarian politician

Member of the National Assembly
- Incumbent
- Assumed office 9 May 2026

Personal details
- Party: TISZA

Lőrinc Mihály Varga is a Hungarian politician who was elected member of the National Assembly in 2026. He has served as an agricultural policy advisor to the Tisza Party since 2024.
