= Hajdú-Bihar County 1st constituency =

Constituency in Hungary (2012-)

Hajdú-Bihar County 1st constituency (Debrecen)
- Constituency for the National Assembly
- Location of Hajdú-Bihar county 01 within Hajdú-Bihar county

- Location of Hajdú-Bihar county within Hungary
- County: Hajdú-Bihar
- Electorate: 66,471 (2022)
- Major settlements: Debrecen

Current constituency
- Created: 2011
- Party: Tisza Party
- Member: Zsolt Tárkányi
- Elected: 2026

The 1st constituency of Hajdú-Bihar County (Hungarian: Hajdú-Bihar megyei 01. számú országgyűlési egyéni választókerület) is one of the single member constituencies of the National Assembly, the national legislature of Hungary. The constituency standard abbreviation: Hajdú-Bihar 01. OEVK.

Since 2026, it has been represented by Zsolt Tárkányi of the Tisza Party.

== Geography ==
The 1st constituency is located in central part of Hajdú-Bihar County.

=== List of municipalities ===
The constituency includes the following municipalities:

1. Debrecen: Northwestern part of the city.

== Members ==
The constituency was first represented by Lajos Kósa of the Fidesz from 2014, and he was re-elected in 2018 and 2022. In the 2026 election, Zsolt Tárkányi of the Tisza Party was elected representative.

Election	Member	Party	%	Ref.
2014	Lajos Kósa	Fidesz	47.06	
2018	Lajos Kósa	Fidesz	47.36	
2022	Lajos Kósa	Fidesz	48.95	
2026	Zsolt Tárkányi	TISZA	59.50	
