= Csongor Kincse =

Hungarian politician

Member of the National Assembly
- Incumbent
- Assumed office May 2026

Personal details
- Born: 9 April 2000 (age 26) Baja, Hungary
- Party: Tisza Party
- Education: Albert Szent-Györgyi Medical University

Csongor Kincse is a Hungarian politician who was elected member of the National Assembly in 2026. He is a resident physician in obstetrics and gynaecology.
