= Márton Hajdu =

Hungarian politician

Member of the National Assembly
- Incumbent
- Assumed office 9 May 2026

Personal details
- Party: TISZA

Márton Ádám Hajdu is a Hungarian politician who was elected member of the National Assembly in 2026. He is the chief of staff of the Tisza Party group in the European Parliament.
