= Orsolya Schummer =

Hungarian politician

Member of the National Assembly
- Incumbent
- Assumed office 9 May 2026

Personal details
- Party: TISZA

Orsolya Schummer is a Hungarian politician who was elected member of the National Assembly in 2026. She has served as coordinator of the Tisza Party in the Southern Great Plain since 2025.
