= Zsolt Tárkányi =

Hungarian politician (born 1986)

Member of the National Assembly
- Incumbent
- Assumed office 9 May 2026
- Preceded by: Lajos Kósa
- Constituency: Hajdú-Bihar 1st

Personal details
- Born: 1986 (age 39–40)
- Party: TISZA

Zsolt Tárkányi (born 1986) is a Hungarian politician who was elected member of the National Assembly in 2026. He has served as press secretary of the Tisza Party since 2025.
