= Budapest 16th constituency =

Hungarian legislative district

Coordinates: 47°26′N 19°06′E

Budapest 16th constituency (District XX.)
- Constituency for the National Assembly
- Location of Budapest 16 within Budapest

- Location of Budapest within Hungary
- City: Budapest
- Electorate: 72,723 (2018)
- Major settlements: 20th District

Current constituency
- Created: 2011
- Party: Tisza Party
- Member: Zoltán Tarr
- Elected: 2026

The 16th constituency of Budapest (Hungarian: Budapesti 16. számú országgyűlési egyéni választókerület) is one of the single-member constituencies of the National Assembly, the national legislature of Hungary. The constituency standard abbreviation: Budapest 16. OEVK.

Since 2026, it has been represented by Zoltán Tarr of the Tisza Party.

== Geography ==
The 16th constituency is located in southern part of Pest.

=== List of districts ===
The constituency includes the following municipalities:

1. District XX.: Full part of the district.
2. District XIX.: Southwestern part of the district (west of the Ady Endre út).

== Members ==
The constituency was first represented by István Hiller of MSZP (with Unity support) from 2014, and he was re-elected in 2018. In the 2026 election, Zoltán Tarr of the Tisza Party was elected representative.

Election	Member	Party	%
2014 (Note: Hiller is a member of MSZP, he ran as a joint candidate of the Unity electoral alliance during the 2014 parliamentary election.)	István Hiller	MSZP	
2018	István Hiller	MSZP	
2022	István Hiller	MSZP	46.35
2026	Zoltán Tarr	TISZA	59.52
