= Dóra Szűcs =

Hungarian politician

Member of the National Assembly
- Incumbent
- Assumed office 9 May 2026

Personal details
- Party: TISZA

Dóra Szűcs is a Hungarian politician who was elected member of the National Assembly in 2026. She is the head of education policy of the Tisza Party.
