= Gergely Gulyás =

Hungarian politician (born 1981)

Gergely Gulyás MP
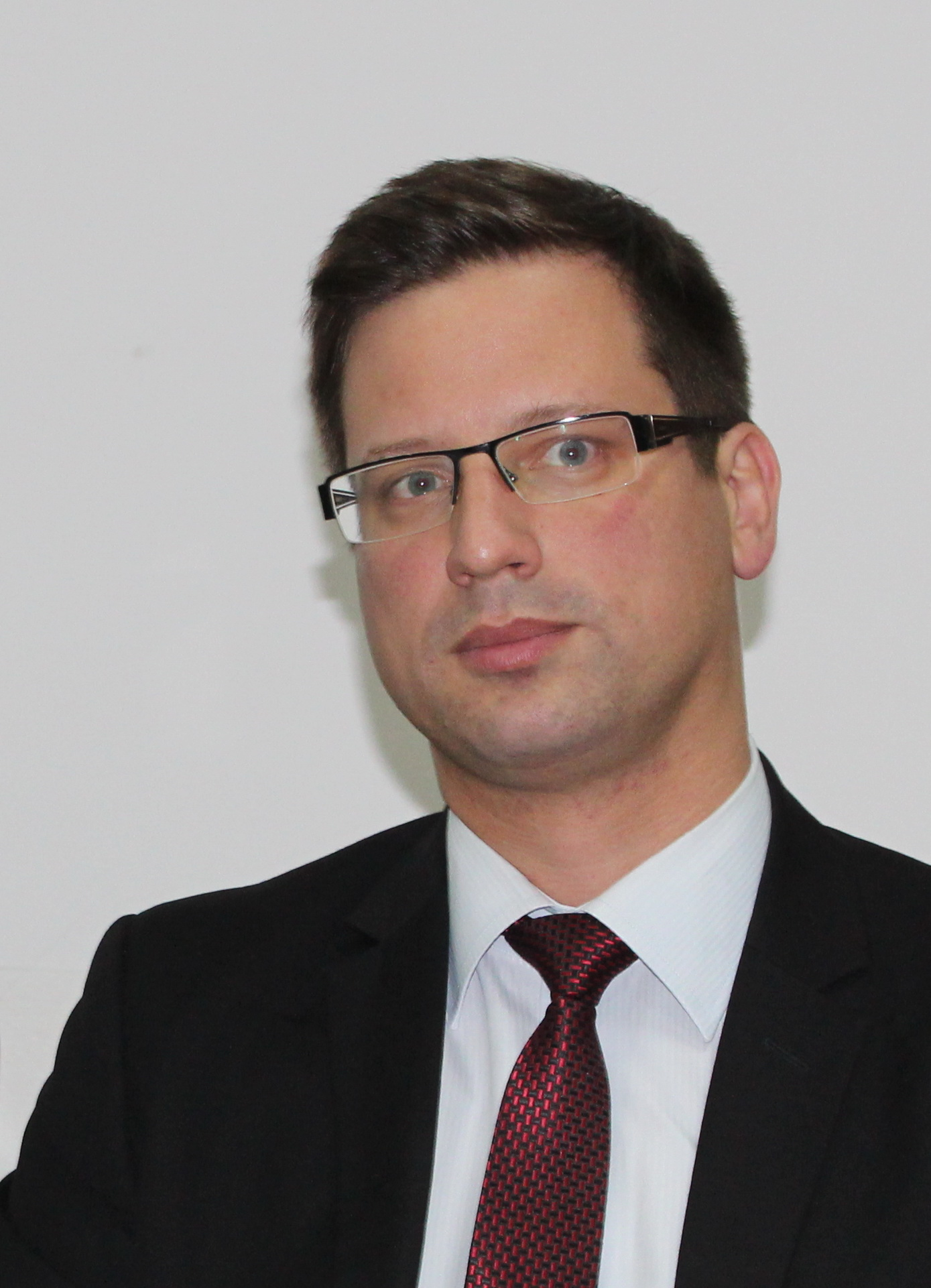
- Gulyás in 2017

Leader of the Fidesz Group in the National Assembly
- In office 9 May 2026 – 21 July 2026
- Preceded by: Máté Kocsis
- Succeeded by: János Bóka
- In office 2 October 2017 – 8 May 2018
- Preceded by: Lajos Kósa
- Succeeded by: Máté Kocsis

Minister of the Prime Minister's Office
- In office 18 May 2018 – 12 May 2026
- Prime Minister: Viktor Orbán
- Preceded by: János Lázár
- Succeeded by: Bálint Ruff

Deputy Speaker of the National Assembly for Legislation
- In office 6 May 2014 – 1 October 2017
- Preceded by: Position established
- Succeeded by: Csaba Hende

Member of the National Assembly
- Incumbent
- Assumed office 14 May 2010

Personal details
- Born: 21 September 1981 (age 45) Budapest, Hungary
- Party: Fidesz
- Spouse: Ivett Budai (m. 2024)
- Education: Pázmány Péter Catholic University
- Profession: Jurist, politician

Gergely Gulyás (born 21 September 1981) is a Hungarian politician who has been a member of the National Assembly since 2010. He is a member of Fidesz. He served as Minister of the Prime Minister's Office from 2018 to 2026 and as the leader of Fidesz's parliamentary faction from 2017 to 2018 and again, briefly, from May to July 2026.

== Early life and career ==
Gergely Gulyás was born on 21 September 1981 in Budapest.

He studied at Pázmány Péter Catholic University, where he was a close friend of Péter Magyar.

== Political career ==
Gulyás was first elected to the National Assembly in 2010.

Gulyás was a deputy chairman of the Committee for Human Rights, Minorities, Civic and Religious Affairs of the Hungarian Parliament.. In 2011, he participated in the formulation of the new Constitution, earning him criticism from the parliamentary opposition at the time. After several protests he said that "despite political debates we think it is an important value that for the first time, a freely elected parliament created the Basic Law".

In October 2011 Gulyás co-authored a bill, "lex Biszku", which aimed to hold citizens and law enforcement officials responsible for reprisals against demonstrators following the unrest of 1956. He stated during a news conference in October 2011 that the party's proposal for a solution was constitutional and in line with international law.

In his second term, Gulyás was appointed Deputy Speaker of the National Assembly responsible for the Legislation on 6 May 2014. He was elected one of the four vice-presidents of the Fidesz party on 13 December 2015, holding the position until 29 September 2019. Gulyás became leader of the Fidesz parliamentary group on 2 October 2017, replacing Lajos Kósa. He again became leader in 2026, when outgoing Prime Minister Viktor Orbán declined to assume his seat in the next parliament.

In his third term which coincided with the Fourth Orbán Government, Gulyás was named Minister of the Prime Minister's Office in May 2018. In the Fifth Orbán Government, Gulyás retained his position.

Following Fidesz's defeat in the 2026 Hungarian parliamentary election, news portal Telex.hu reported that Gulyás informed Orbán of his intention to resign from the National Assembly and leave politics on 14 April. According to Telex, Orbán urged him to stay and offered the position of parliamentary leadership of the party; Gulyás agreed on the condition that he would remain in office for no more than a year. Three months later, after the Magyar Government amended the Fundamental Law of Hungary to introduce a 12-year term limit for members of the National Assembly, Gulyás resigned in protest. Other Fidesz MNAs, such as Sándor F. Kovács, speculated that he had resigned due to his friendship with Magyar, feeling responsible for the latter's political rise. Other MNAs, speaking to Telex on condition of anonymity, argued that Gulyás left politics because he felt that continuing to participate was pointless when he would be removed by term limits in the next National Assembly term.

== Political stances ==
On 13 January 2023, amidst, Gulyás stated that Hungary would decline to allow the transit of Leopard 2 tanks by NATO countries to Ukraine, "because it does not want to endanger ethnic Hungarians living in the Zakarpattia region of Ukraine." The Hungarian publication Hirado published a video of the press conference on its website.

On 23 March 2023, Gulyás said that of the ICC arrest warrant for the Russian president Vladimir Putin: "We can refer to the Hungarian law and based on that we cannot arrest the Russian President... as the ICC's statute has not been promulgated in Hungary." He has further said that his government has not "formed a stance" in relation to the ICC arrest warrant.

National Assembly of Hungary
Preceded by Office established	Deputy Speaker for Legislation; 2014–2017	Succeeded by Csaba Hende
Preceded by Lajos Kósa	Leader of the Fidesz parliamentary group 2017–2018	Succeeded by Máté Kocsis
Preceded by Máté Kocsis	Leader of the Fidesz parliamentary group 2026	Succeeded by János Bóka
Political offices
Preceded by János Lázár	Minister of Prime Minister's Office; 2018–2026	Succeeded by Bálint Ruff
