= Márk Radnai =

Hungarian politician (born 1988)

Commissioner for a Humane and Functional Hungary
- Incumbent
- Assumed office 13 May 2026
- Prime Minister: Peter Magyar
- Preceded by: Office established

Member of the National Assembly
- Incumbent
- Assumed office 9 May 2026
- Preceded by: Gábor Erős
- Constituency: Komárom-Esztergom's 2nd

Vice-President of the Tisza Party
- Incumbent
- Assumed office 22 July 2024 Serving with Zoltán Tarr and Ágnes Forsthoffer

Personal details
- Born: 26 March 1988 (age 38) Budapest, Hungary
- Party: TISZA

Márk Radnai (born 26 March 1988) is a Hungarian politician, actor, theater director, and entrepreneur. He rose to prominence in the Hungarian theatre scene as the founder of the experimental 011 Creative Group and later gained recognition as a television director. Since 2024, he has served as vice president and chief operating officer of the political party TISZA, overseeing events and media content.

== Career ==
Radnai was born in Budapest, Hungary, and raised in Piliscsaba. His father, László Radnai, worked in advertising and previously served as the communications director for the Jobbik party. His mother was a real estate developer.

He attended the Temesvári Pelbárt Franciscan High School in Esztergom between 2000 and 2006. After graduation, he was admitted to the Keleti István Art School. He initially applied to the University of Theatre and Film Arts (SZFE) in Budapest as a directing student, but was accepted into the acting program instead. He graduated in 2012 in the class of Gábor Máté. In 2010, he was also accepted into the theatre directing program, led by Gábor Székely and Viktor Bodó, although he did not complete the program.

In 2011, he founded the 011 Creative Group (011 Alkotócsoport), who began performing progressive, film-like theater that was unusual in Hungarian theater and specifically aimed at young people. In response to a review in 2015, he threatened Tamás Koltai, a critic for Élet és Irodalom, that he would break his fingers; after the incident received widespread media coverage, Radnai left the theater.

In the same year, he was asked to direct the then-new series Holnap Tali!, of which he directed 240 episodes. In 2018, he directed the second season of Korhatáros szerelem, then became the main director of Drága örökösök, which was watched by more than a million people every day on television.

In 2020, he founded a platform called SzínházTV, which broadcast theater performances. The site ceased operations in 2023.

=== Political career ===
Since 2024, he has been the vice president and chief operating officer of the Tisza Party, responsible for events and video content.
