= Zoltán Tarr =

Hungarian politician (born 1972)

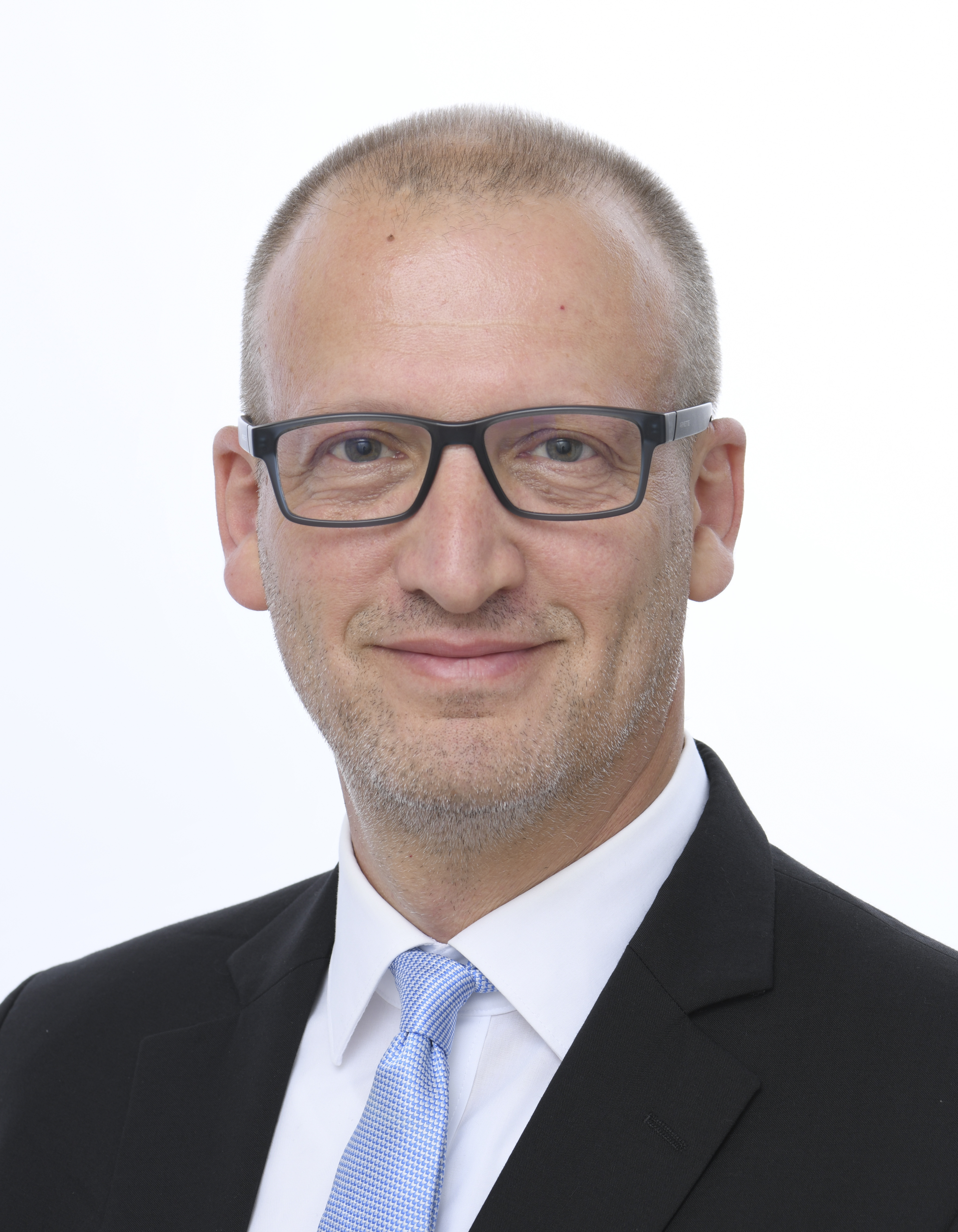
- Official portrait, 2024

Minister of Social Relations and Culture
- Incumbent
- Assumed office 13 May 2026
- Prime Minister: Péter Magyar
- Preceded by: Balázs Hankó

Member of the European Parliament
- In office 16 July 2024 – 8 May 2026
- Succeeded by: Viktor Weisz
- Constituency: Hungary

Member of the National Assembly
- Incumbent
- Assumed office 9 May 2026
- Preceded by: István Hiller
- Constituency: Budapest 16th

Vice-President of the Tisza Party
- Incumbent
- Assumed office 22 July 2024 Serving with Márk Radnai and Ágnes Forsthoffer
- President: Péter Magyar
- Preceded by: Péter Magyar

Personal details
- Born: Zoltán József Tarr; 1972 (age 53–54) Budapest, Hungary
- Party: TISZA
- Other political affiliations: European People's Party

Zoltán József Tarr (born 1972) is a Hungarian politician and former Reformed priest. As a member of Tisza Party, Tarr led the party's delegation in the European Parliament between 2024 and 2026, until his nomination as minister of culture after Tisza's landslide victory in the 2026 elections.

Tarr has served as a cabinet minister in the Magyar Government since 13 May 2026.

== Early life and career ==
Tarr was born in Budapest in 1972. In the 1990 parliamentary election, he voted for the Hungarian Democratic Forum. He worked as a reformed pastor for several universities, and was later head of the national administration of the church. In 2015 he left the church to work at a tech company, following the appointment of a new leadership in the church. He worked at an institution of the Ministry for National Economy until April 2024, when he was fired a few days after criticizing bishop Zoltán Balog at a demonstration organized by Péter Magyar.

Tarr criticised the Hungarian Pride parade ban by the government of Viktor Orbán, arguing that it stifled freedom of assembly. Tarr pledged that a Tisza Party government would not ban Budapest Pride.
