= Barbara Hegedűs =

Hungarian politician (born 1991)

Member of the National Assembly
- Incumbent
- Assumed office 4 November 2024
- Preceded by: Csaba Dömötör

Personal details
- Born: 14 March 1991 (age 35)
- Party: Fidesz

Barbara Szilvia Hegedűs (born 14 March 1991) is a Hungarian politician serving as a member of the National Assembly since 2024. From 2019 to 2024, she served as deputy mayor of Veszprém.
