= Hajnalka Juhász =

Hungarian lawyer and political scientist

Hajnalka Juhász MP
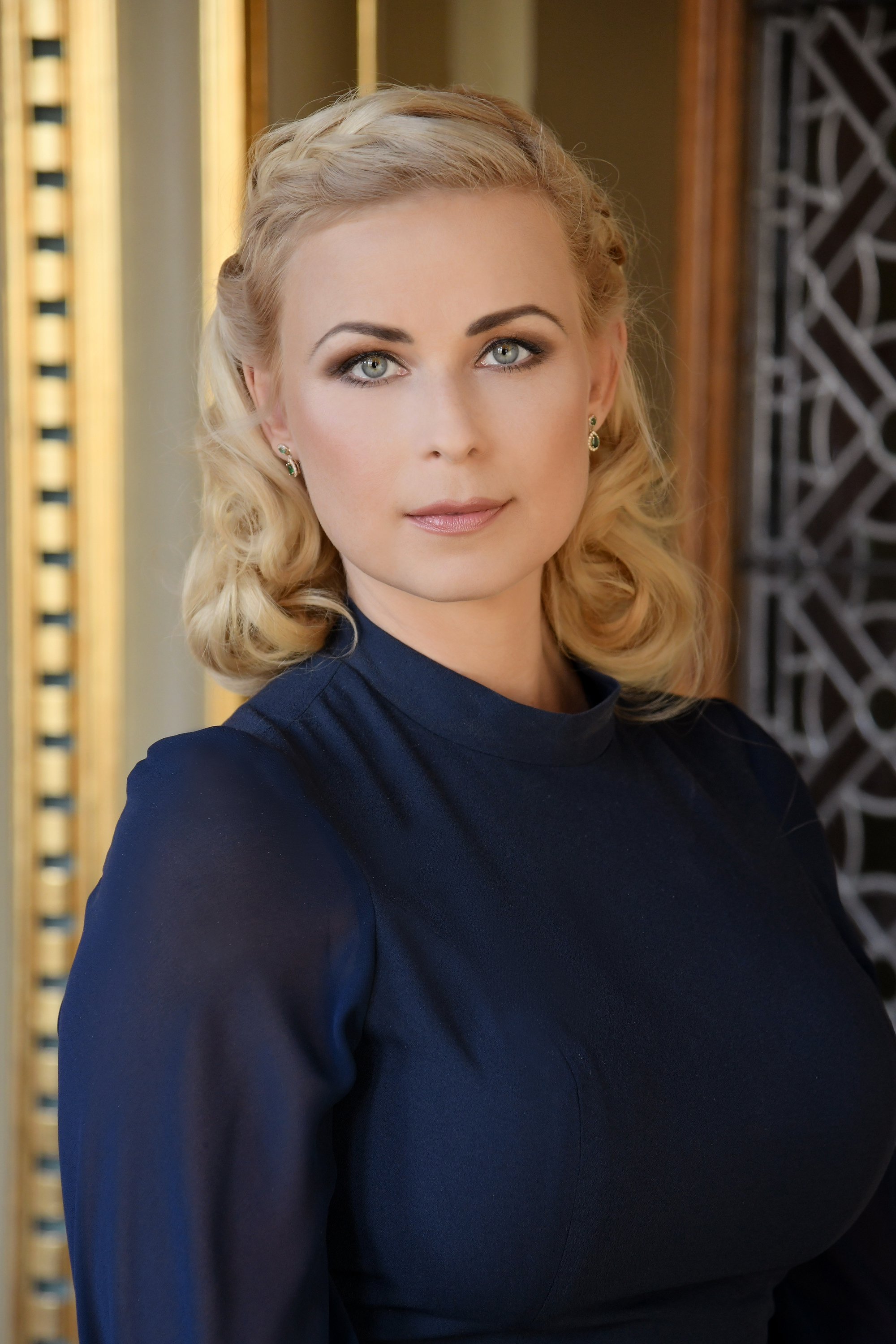

Member of the National Assembly
- Incumbent
- Assumed office May 2018

Personal details
- Born: July 28, 1980 (age 45) Kazincbarcika, Hungary
- Party: KDNP
- Profession: politician

Hajnalka Juhász (born 28 July 1980) is a Hungarian lawyer and political scientist. She has been a member of the National Assembly of Hungary (MP) as a representative of the Christian Democratic People's Party since 2018, and is currently serving as Vice Chair of the Parliamentary Committee on Foreign Affairs and as a member of the Hungarian delegation of the Parliamentary Assembly of the Council of Europe. In December 2020, she was appointed Ministerial Commissioner responsible for the furthering of international relations in connection with the priorities associated with Hungary's presidency of the Committee of Ministers of the Council of Europe.

== Personal life ==
Juhász was born into a traditional family of medical doctors in Kazincbarcika.

== Education ==
She graduated from the Fráter György Catholic High School. She earned a degree in law from the State and Legal Studies faculty at the Károli Gáspár University of the Reformed Church in Hungary, before completing a master's degree in Public International Law at the University of Leicester in the United Kingdom. She received the absolutorium for Ph.D. from the State and Legal Studies faculty at the University of Szeged. Her area of research was the protection of the rights of national minority groups as practised by the European Council, for which her supervisor was László Trócsányi, Minister of Justice in Hungary.

== Political career ==
Having returned to Hungary following her studies in the UK, Juhász joined the Christian Democratic People's Party and the Youth Christian Democratic Alliance (Ifjúsági Kereszténydemokrata Szövetség, IKSZ) in 2009. She was appointed regional vice chair of IKSZ alongside then-chairman Bence Rétvári, but resigned from the position in 2013 after being asked to serve as a national expert at the European Council. She has remained an active member of both the Christian Democratic People's Party and IKSZ. She was granted a parliamentary seat following the Hungary's 2018 elections on the national list of the Christian Democratic People's Party. From 2019 to 2020, she served as Ministerial Commissioner responsible for tasks associated with the development of international relations in relation to humanitarian aid provided by Hungary. She was appointed vice president of the Christian Democratic People's Party in January 2020. In December 2020, she was named Ministerial Commissioner responsible for the furthering of international relations in connection with the priorities associated with Hungary's presidency of the Committee of Ministers of the Council of Europe.
