= Andrea Bujdosó =

Hungarian politician (born 1970)

- Bujdosó in 2025

Leader of the Tisza Parliamentary Group in the National Assembly
- Incumbent
- Assumed office 9 May 2026
- Deputy: György László Velkey
- Preceded by: Position established

Member of the National Assembly
- Incumbent
- Assumed office 9 May 2026
- Preceded by: Eszter Vitályos
- Constituency: Pest County 3rd

Parliamentary leader of the Tisza Party in the General Assembly of Budapest
- Incumbent
- Assumed office 4 July 2025
- Preceded by: Eszter Ordas
- Succeeded by: TBD
- Constituency: Party list

Personal details
- Born: Andrea Anna Bujdosó; 3 February 1970 (age 56) Salonta, Bihor County, Socialist Republic of Romania (now Salonta, Bihor County, Romania)
- Party: TISZA
- Education: West University of Timișoara

Andrea Anna Bujdosó (born 3 February 1970) is a Romanian-born Hungarian politician who was elected member of the National Assembly in 2026. She has been a member of the General Assembly of Budapest since 2024.
