= Krisztián Kőszegi =

Hungarian politician (born 1993)

Member of the National Assembly
- Incumbent
- Assumed office 9 May 2026

Personal details
- Born: 19 January 1993 (age 33)
- Party: Tisza Party

Krisztián Kőszegi (born 19 January 1993) is a Hungarian politician serving as a member of the National Assembly since 2026. He has served as deputy speaker of the Assembly since 2026.
