= János Bóka =

Hungarian politician

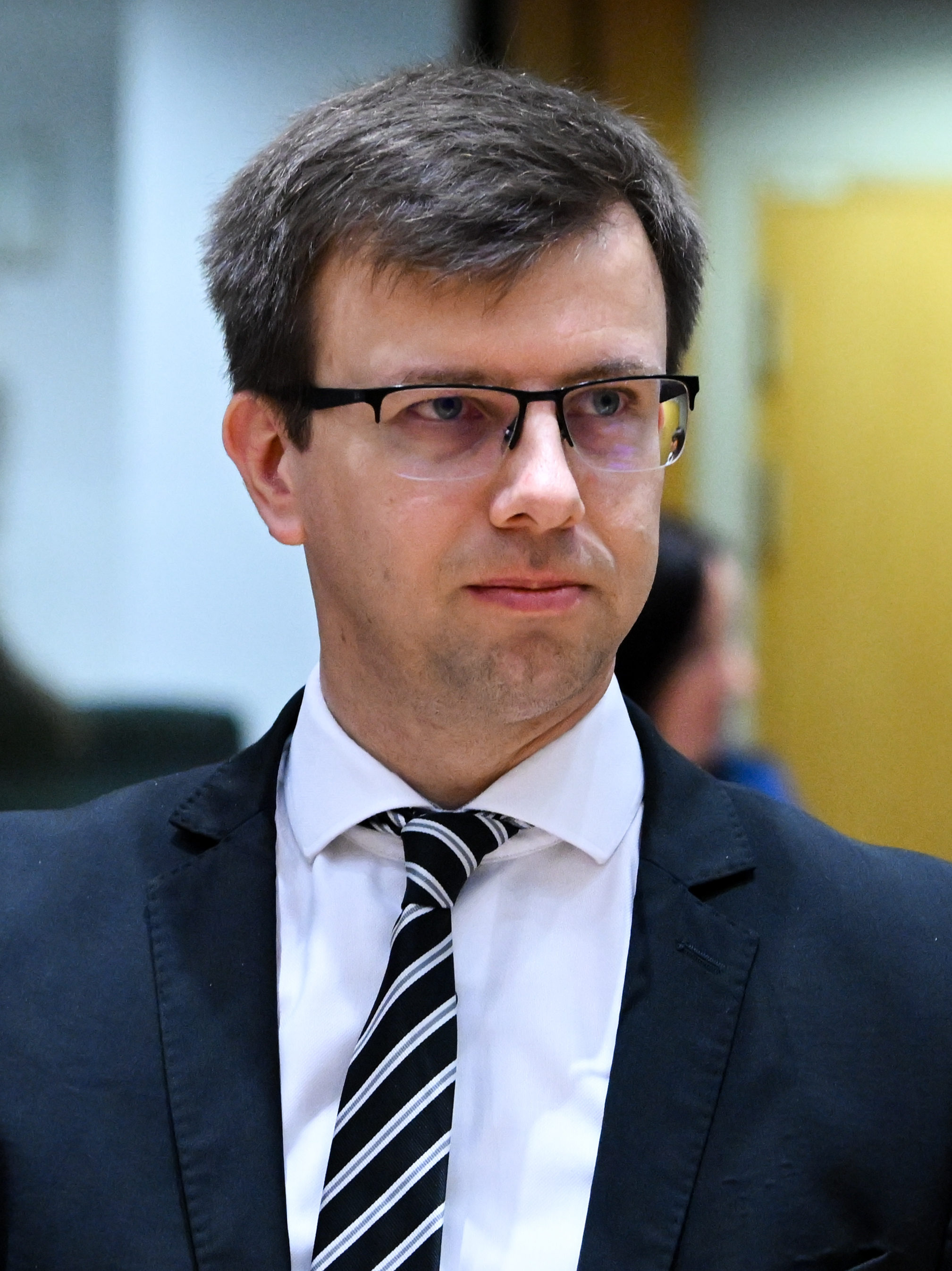
- Bóka in 2024

Leader of the Fidesz Group in the National Assembly
- Incumbent
- Assumed office 22 July 2026
- Preceded by: Gergely Gulyás

Minister for European Union Affairs
- In office 1 August 2023 – 12 May 2026
- Prime Minister: Viktor Orbán
- Preceded by: Office established
- Succeeded by: Anita Orbán (as Minister of Foreign Affairs)

Member of the National Assembly
- Incumbent
- Assumed office 9 May 2026

Personal details
- Party: Fidesz (since 2026)
- Other political affiliations: Alliance of Free Democrats

János Bóka is a Hungarian politician, who served as minister for European Union affairs from 2023 to 2026. He previously worked as a professor at the National University of Public Service, the Károli Gáspár University of the Reformed Church in Hungary, and the Faculty of Law and Public Administration of the University of Szeged. He is a former member of the Alliance of Free Democrats.

In 2026, Bóka acting as Hungary’s Special Envoy for Combating Antisemitism, unveiled a government plan to support Jewish life and combat antisemitism, including educational programs, community support, and the establishment of the Brüll Alfréd House as a Holocaust memorial and cultural venue.

Bóka held his ministerial position until the 2026 Hungarian parliamentary election, when ruling party Fidesz–KDNP fell from power. He was elected a Member of Parliament via the party's national list and he became vice-chairman of the parliament's European Affairs Committee. Following the resignation of Gergely Gulyás, Bóka was elected leader of the Fidesz parliamentary group on 21 July 2026.

National Assembly of Hungary
Preceded by Gergely Gulyás	Leader of the Fidesz parliamentary group 2026–	Incumbent
