= Bálint Nagy =

Hungarian weightlifter

Personal information
- Nationality: Hungarian
- Born: 28 June 1919; Balmazújváros, Hungary
- Died: 12 July 1975 (aged 56)

Sport
- Sport: Weightlifting

Bálint Nagy (28 June 1919 – 12 July 1975) was a Hungarian weightlifter. He competed at the 1948 Summer Olympics and the 1952 Summer Olympics.
