= Balázs Győrffy (politician) =

Hungarian politician

Balázs Győrffy MEP
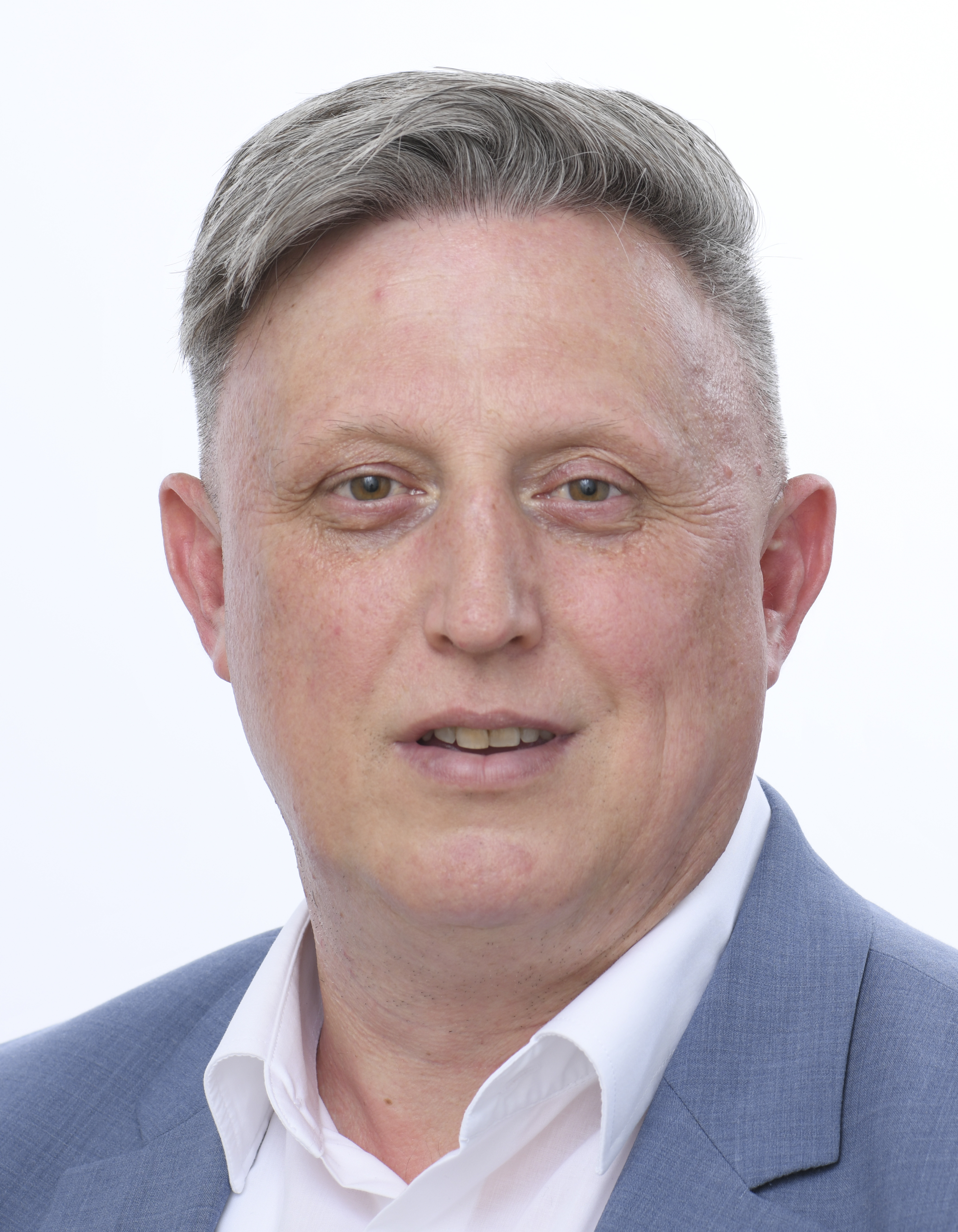

Member of the European Parliament
- In office 16 July 2024 – 1 September 2024

Member of the National Assembly
- In office 14 May 2010 – 9 July 2024

Personal details
- Born: 21 April 1979 (age 46) Pápa, Hungary
- Party: MAGOSZ (Fidesz-ally)
- Spouse: Henrietta Győrffy-Bojás
- Children: Huba
- Profession: politician

Balázs Győrffy (born April 21, 1979) is a Hungarian politician, member of the National Assembly (MP) from Fidesz Veszprém County Regional List between 2010 and 2014, and from his party's national list from 2014 to 2024. He briefly served as a Member of the European Parliament in 2024. He served as mayor of Nemesgörzsöny from 2006 to 2014. He has been the inaugural president of the National Chamber of Agriculture (NAK) since 2013.

He is serving as leader of the MAGOSZ (advocacy organization of the Hungarian agrarian workers) in Veszprém County. After the 2010 elections he was elected to the Parliamentary Committee on Agriculture. Győrffy was appointed Chairman of the Subcommittee to investigate abuses of the previous Socialist government.

He resigned from all of his positions and left Fidesz on August 23, 2024 after he hit a woman the previous night. Győrffy was under the influence of alcohol. The case is being investigated by the police.

== Personal life ==
He is married. His wife is Henrietta Győrffy-Bojás. They have a son, Huba.
