= Ágnes Forsthoffer =

Hungarian politician (born 1980)

Ágnes Forsthoffer MP
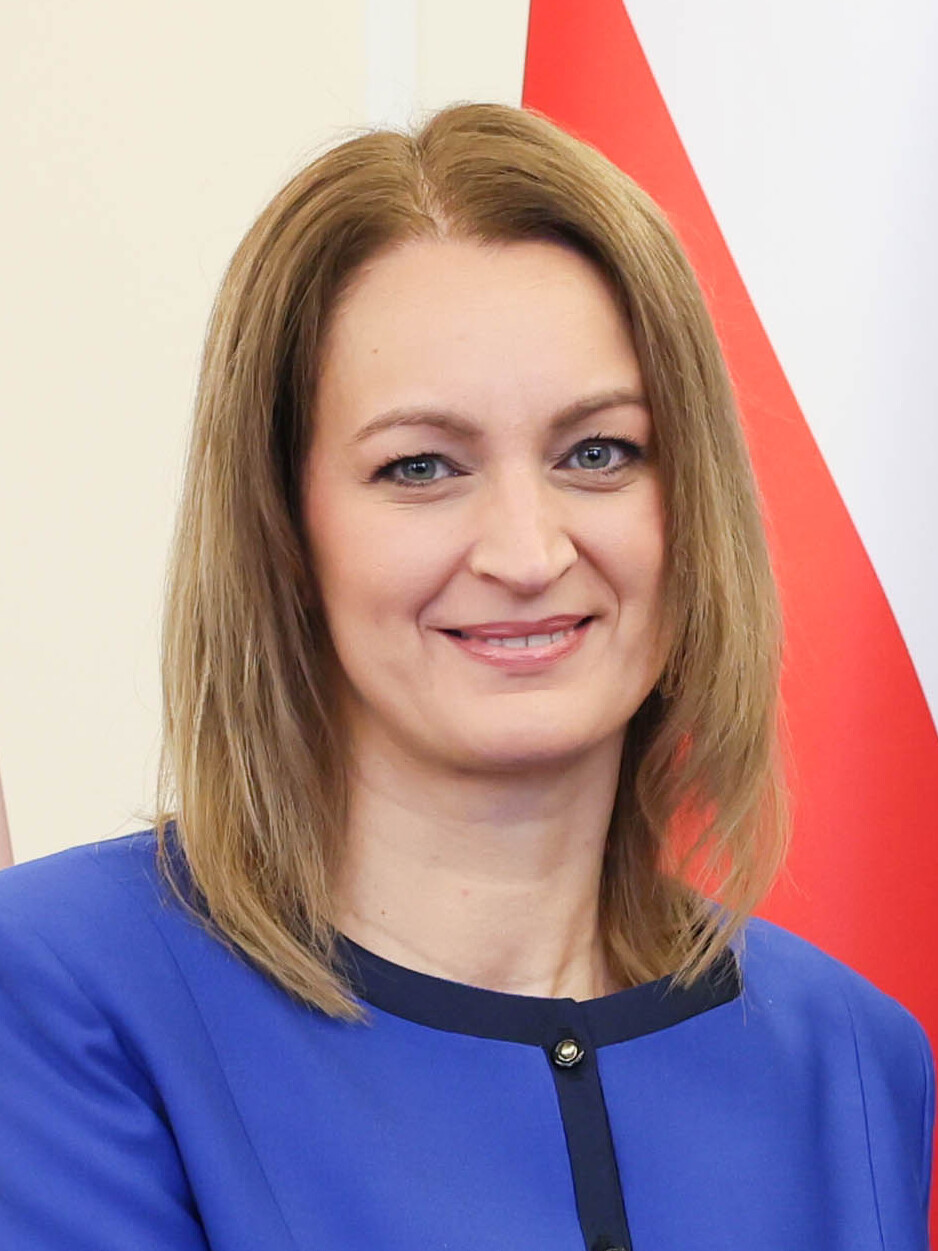
- Forsthoffer in 2026

Speaker of the National Assembly
- Incumbent
- Assumed office 9 May 2026
- Preceded by: László Kövér

Acting President of Hungary
- In office 20 July 2026 – 19 August 2026
- Prime Minister: Péter Magyar
- Preceded by: Tamás Sulyok
- Succeeded by: András Baka

Vice President of TISZA
- Incumbent
- Assumed office 19 September 2025 Serving with Márk Radnai and Zoltán Tarr
- President: Péter Magyar

Member of the National Assembly
- Incumbent
- Assumed office 9 May 2026
- Preceded by: Károly Kontrát
- Constituency: Veszprém County 2nd

Personal details
- Born: 24 March 1980 (age 46) Balatonfüred, Hungary
- Party: TISZA
- Education: Budapest University of Economics and Business (BS); University of Pécs (MS)

Ágnes Forsthoffer (Note: Hungarian pronunciation: [ˈaːɡnɛʃ ˈfɔrʃtˌhɔfːɛr]) (born 24 March 1980) is a Hungarian politician and businesswoman who has served as Speaker of the National Assembly since 2026.

Before becoming speaker and acting president, Forsthoffer worked in finance and management. Entering politics in 2024, she joined the Tisza Party and became its vice president in 2025. After her election as speaker of the National Assembly, she briefly served ex officio as acting president of Hungary following Tamás Sulyok's constitutional removal from office.

== Early life and education ==
Forsthoffer was born on 24 March 1980 in Balatonfüred to parents Ferenc Forsthoffer and Julianna Gyöngyi Varró. Her father was the former director of the Balatonfüred shipyard and the waste management company Talajerőgazdálkodási Kft. Forsthoffer was raised in Balatonfüred and completed her secondary education at Lovassy László Gimnázium in Veszprém. In 1998, she was crowned Belle of the Anna-ball.

After completing secondary school, Forsthoffer relocated to Budapest to enroll in the Budapest University of Economics and Business. She received a bachelor's degree in finance and accounting in 2002, and afterwards received a master's degree in marketing from the University of Pécs in 2004.

== Business career ==
In 2001, Forsthoffer worked as an audit assistant at Deloitte for ten months, before becoming a financial director at Talajerőgazdálkodási Kft. in Pápa in 2002. She became the managing director of Talajerőgazdálkodási Kft. in 2012, where her mother and brother are also employed as managers of the company.

In 2006, Forsthoffer's family took over ownership of the Hotel Margaréta in Balatonfüred and its management company, and Forsthoffer has served as a director at both establishments since then. In 2023, she became the Balatonfüred regional director of the Hungarian Hotels and Restaurants Association (MSZÉSZ).

== Political career ==
Forsthoffer first entered politics in 2024, when she ran as an independent in the 2024 Hungarian local elections for Balatonfüred's 8th constituency. However, she was not elected.

In September 2025, Forsthoffer was elected as the third vice president of the Tisza Party during the party's general assembly. As vice president, she serves alongside additional vice presidents Márk Radnai and Zoltán Tarr. She stood as a candidate for the Tisza Party in the 2026 parliamentary election, and was elected to the National Assembly from Veszprém County's 2nd constituency. Following the election, incoming prime minister Péter Magyar announced that he would nominate Forsthoffer to serve as speaker of the National Assembly once its membership was sworn in. She was sworn in on 9 May (Europe Day); in her first decree, she reinstated the flag of Europe on the Hungarian Parliament Building.

Following the constitutional removal of Tamás Sulyok, Forsthoffer became acting President of Hungary on 20 July 2026 until the inauguration of his successor András Baka on 19 August.

== Notes ==
Political offices
Preceded by László Kövér	Speaker of the National Assembly; 2026–present	Incumbent
Preceded by Tamás Sulyok	President of Hungary; Acting; 2026	Succeeded by András Baka
