= Eszter Vitályos =

Hungarian politician and lawyer

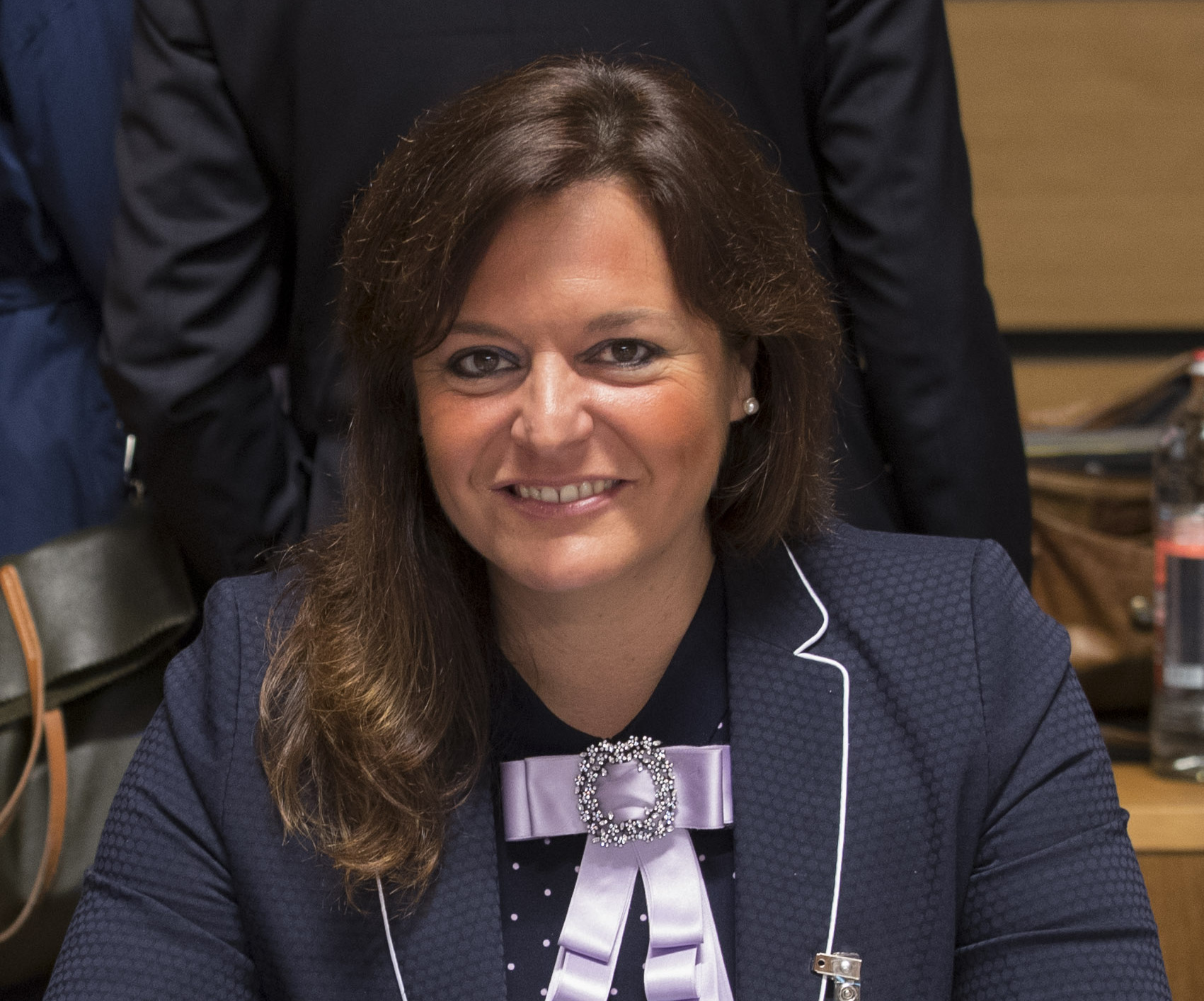
- Vitályos in 2018

Deputy Speaker of the National Assembly
- Incumbent
- Assumed office 13 May 2026

Spokesperson of the Government of Hungary
- In office 1 April 2024 – 12 May 2026
- Prime Minister: Viktor Orbán
- Preceded by: Alexandra Szentkirályi
- Succeeded by: Anita Köböl; Éva Magyar; Vanda Szondi

Member of the National Assembly
- Incumbent
- Assumed office 20 September 2021

Personal details
- Born: 23 February 1979 (age 47) Budapest, Hungary
- Party: Fidesz
- Education: Pázmány Péter Catholic University; Budapest Metropolitan University
- Profession: Politician, lawyer

Eszter Vitályos (born 23 February 1979) is a Hungarian politician and lawyer.

== Life ==
In 2005, Eszter Vitályos obtained a law degree at Pázmány Péter Catholic University. In 2021 she passed a degree in political communication at the Budapest Metropolitan University.

In 2014, she was appointed Deputy State Secretary in charge of the development policy. From 2018, Eszter Vitályos was the State Secretary responsible for European Union development policy at the Ministry of Human Resources.

Vitályos was elected a Member of Parliament in September 2021, replacing László L. Simon, who was appointed director of the Hungarian National Museum. In the 2022 Hungarian parliamentary election, she was elected as a member of parliament for Pest County 3rd constituency in the national assembly. From 2022 to 2024, she served as deputy minister and parliamentary state secretary of the Ministry of Culture and Innovation.

From April 1, 2024, she was the spokesperson of the Hungarian government and state secretary responsible for government communication. Róbert Zsigó takes over her role at the Ministry of Culture and Innovation. She held the position until the 2026 Hungarian parliamentary election, when Fidesz fell from power.

Vitályos was elected a Member of Parliament via the national list of Fidesz–KDNP in the 2026 election, after she was defeated by Tisza candidate Andrea Bujdosó in Pilisvörösvár constituency in a landslide. After the governing Tisza Party rejected Péter Szijjártó's nomination, the Fidesz caucus delegated Vitályos as one of the deputy speakers of the National Assembly.
