= Richárd Rák =

Hungarian politician

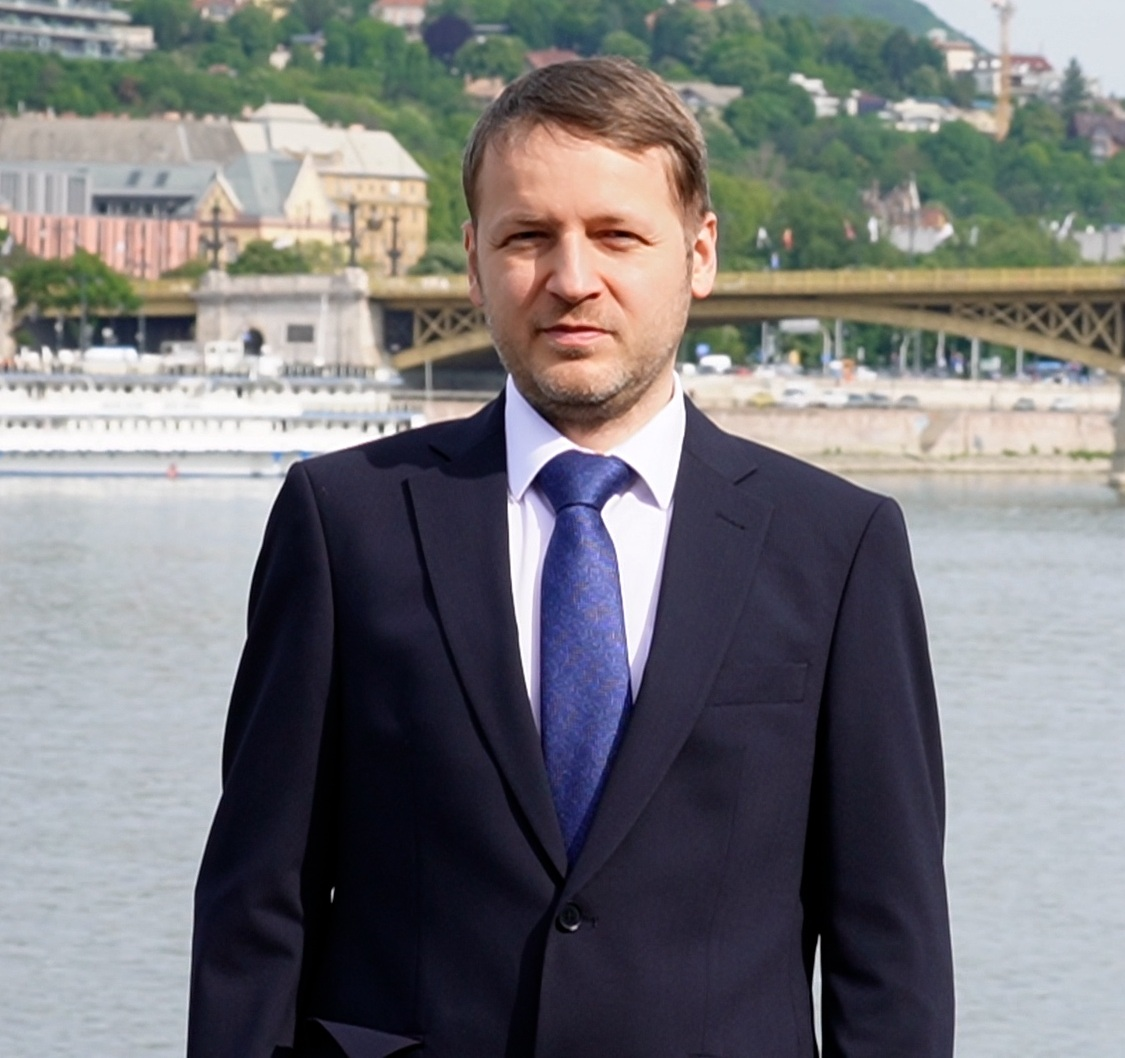

Member of National Assembly of Hungary (9 May 2026 – ) Deputy Speaker Responsible for Legislation of National Assembly of Hungary (9 May 2026 – )

Personal details
- Born: 1989 (age 36–37) Budapest
- Party: TISZA
- Education: University of Bologna, University of Turin, University of Vienna
- Profession: Jurist, Economist, Politician

Richárd Rák (Budapest, 1989) is a Hungarian lawyer, economist and politician. From 2026, he serves as Member of Parliament (TISZA Party), the Deputy Speaker Responsible for Legislation, and Chair of the Legislative Committee of the National Assembly of Hungary.

== Early life and professional career ==
Born in Budapest, but he spent most of his primary school years in London. He completed his secondary studies at the Apáczai Csere János Grammar School of Eötvös Loránd University. Representing Hungary, he won a bronze medal in 2006 at the International Geography Olympiad held in Brisbane, Australia.

He obtained a Law degree at Károli Gáspár University of the Reformed Church in Hungary, and then earned a postgraduate specialisation in European law (LL.M.) at Pázmány Péter Catholic University. In addition, he obtained a bachelor’s degree in Economics (Human Resources) at Károli Gáspár University of the Reformed Church in Hungary, a bachelor’s degree in Economics (Finance and Accounting) at Wekerle Business School, became a certified accountant at Budapest University of Economics and Business, and earned a master’s degree in Governance and Leadership at the National University of Public Service.

He began his career as a lawyer at the State Audit Office of Hungary, then worked as a researcher in Italy at the University of Brescia and in Belgium at Ghent University.

He received funding from the European Union’s prestigious Marie Skłodowska-Curie Actions program at both doctoral and postdoctoral levels. He earned a PhD in Law (with a specialisation in Digital Law) at the University of Vienna in Austria, and also obtained a Joint Doctorate in Law, Science and Technology at the University of Bologna and the University of Turin in Italy. His doctoral research was conducted partly in cooperation with the Docplanner healthcare platform group.

He carried out postdoctoral research at the University of Rijeka in Croatia. He was also a visiting researcher at the University of Milan in Italy and the Aristotle University of Thessaloniki in Greece.

His research focuses on legal challenges relating to digitalisation, the Internet of Things, and artificial intelligence, particularly in the areas of data protection and intellectual property. He has also focused extensively on the legal aspects of digital health and common European data spaces, a key component of the European data economy. He is a regular speaker at major European and international conferences on digital law, health law, and e-government.

In addition, he worked in Brussels, where he coordinated the health working group of DigitalEurope, Europe’s largest industry association. In this role, he dealt extensively with challenges relating to the development of the European Health Data Space (EHDS).

== Political career ==
From 2024, he supported the legal and anti-corruption work of the TISZA Party as a volunteer legal expert. In this capacity, he also contributed to the development of TISZA’s 2026 election program “A Functional and Humane Hungary.” During the 2026 Hungarian parliamentary election, he obtained a seat in the National Assembly as a candidate on the TISZA Party’s national list.

On 9 May 2026, the National Assembly of Hungary elected him to serve as the Deputy Speaker Responsible for Legislation of the National Assembly, and Chair of its Legislative Committee.

National Assembly of Hungary
Preceded by Sándor Fazekas	Deputy Speaker for Legislation; 2026–	Incumbent
