= Tisza Party =

Political party in Hungary

Respect and Freedom Party Tisztelet és Szabadság Párt
- Abbreviation: TISZA
- President: Péter Magyar
- Vice Presidents: Márk Radnai; Zoltán Tarr; Ágnes Forsthoffer
- Parliamentary leader: Andrea Bujdosó
- Founding President: Attila Szabó
- Founders: Attila Szabó; Boldizsár Deák
- Founded: 23 October 2020; 6 years ago
- Headquarters: Dobó István utca 16, 3300 Eger
- Newspaper: Tiszta Hang
- Ideology: Conservatism; Populism; Pro-Europeanism
- Political position: Centre-right
- European affiliation: None
- European Parliament group: European People's Party Group
- Colours: Light blue; Dark blue
- Slogan: Árad a Tisza! ('The Tisza is flooding!') Most vagy soha! (2026) ('Now or never!')
- National Assembly: 141 / 199
- European Parliament: 7 / 21
- County Assemblies: 0 / 381
- General Assembly of Budapest: 10 / 33

Website
- magyartisza.hu

The Respect and Freedom Party, (Note: Hungarian: Tisztelet és Szabadság Párt, pronounced [ˈtistɛlɛt ˈeːʃ ˈsɒbɒtʃːaːk ˈpaːrt].) commonly known by its Hungarian abbreviations Tisza Party and TISZA, (Note: Pronounced /ˈtiːsə/ TEES-ə; Hungarian: Tisza Párt, pronounced [ˈtisɒ ˈpaːrt].) is a conservative, centre-right, big tent, pro-European, and populist political party in Hungary. It has been the governing party since the 2026 general election.

Tisza was founded in 2020. It was a minor, extraparliamentary party until 2024, when former Fidesz member and political activist Péter Magyar joined the party in the wake of the Katalin Novák presidential pardon scandal (Hungarian: kegyelmi ügy). Tisza became the electoral vehicle for Magyar's "Stand Up Hungarians Community," members of which assumed a majority of positions in the party's presidium and elected Magyar president in July 2024.

Tisza contested the 2024 European Parliament election, netting 7 seats, and the 2026 general election, in which it won a two-thirds supermajority, sufficient to amend the Fundamental Law without the support of other parliamentary parties and ending 16 consecutive years of Fidesz government. Eszter Lakos and Andrea Bujdosó serve as Tisza's leaders in the European Parliament and the National Assembly, respectively.

Broadly, Tisza has been called a "centrist anti-establishment" and big-tent organization avoiding clear positions and attracting major electoral base from liberal and also left-wing sectors. More narrowly, a member of the European People's Party Group, the party has been described as conservative, liberal-conservative, conservative-liberal, and populist. It is pro-European and atlanticist, favoring closer ties with the European Union and NATO and adoption of the Euro. Tisza supports anti-corruption measures and is critical of the "System of National Cooperation" (Hungarian: Nemzeti Együttműködés Rendszere or NER), the governance strategy of clientelism and institutional capture developed by Fidesz. Tisza accordingly supports increased judicial independence, Hungary's rejoining the European Public Prosecutor's Office, the popular election of the President of the Republic, and term limits for prime ministers and members of the National Assembly.

== History ==
=== Formation and name ===
The party was founded in Eger on 23 October 2020 by local politicians and entrepreneurs Attila Szabó and Boldizsár Deák, and planned to contest the 2022 Hungarian parliamentary election. The party rejected state funds and instead relied on donations and personal wealth of its members. While it collected 222,000 forints, the party could not run in the elections that year.

"Tisza" is a portmanteau of the first syllables of the Hungarian words tisztelet (respect) and szabadság (freedom). This is a play on words: the Tisza, Hungary's second-longest river, is a well-known motif in Hungarian literature and national symbology. The name is used as a theme in party campaigns, with current leader Magyar often referencing it. For example, in reference to the frequency with which the Tisza floods the Great Hungarian Plain, "the Tisza is flooding!" (Hungarian: Árad a Tisza!) has become a popular chant at Magyar's rallies.

=== Péter Magyar's involvement ===
The party remained relatively inactive until 2024. Péter Magyar, the former Fidesz politician and ex-husband of former justice minister Judit Varga, came onto the political scene after the pardoning scandal in which President Katalin Novák pardoned a man who attempted to cover up child sexual abuse. As Minister of Justice, Varga also had to sign the pardons and was therefore complicit in the scandal. Magyar organised his first protest on 15 March, the anniversary of the beginning of the 1848 Hungarian Revolution. Events were also held by both the government and the traditional opposition parties, but his demonstration garnered much more attention.

After this, Magyar proceeded to cause yet another scandal for the government, as he published a recording relating to the Schadl–Völner corruption case involving two senior officials. In the recording, his ex-wife—the Minister of Justice at the time—admitted that documents relating to the trial had been altered at the orders of the government. As he presented this information to the court, a protest crowd of around one thousand gathered outside, demanding the resignation of the government.

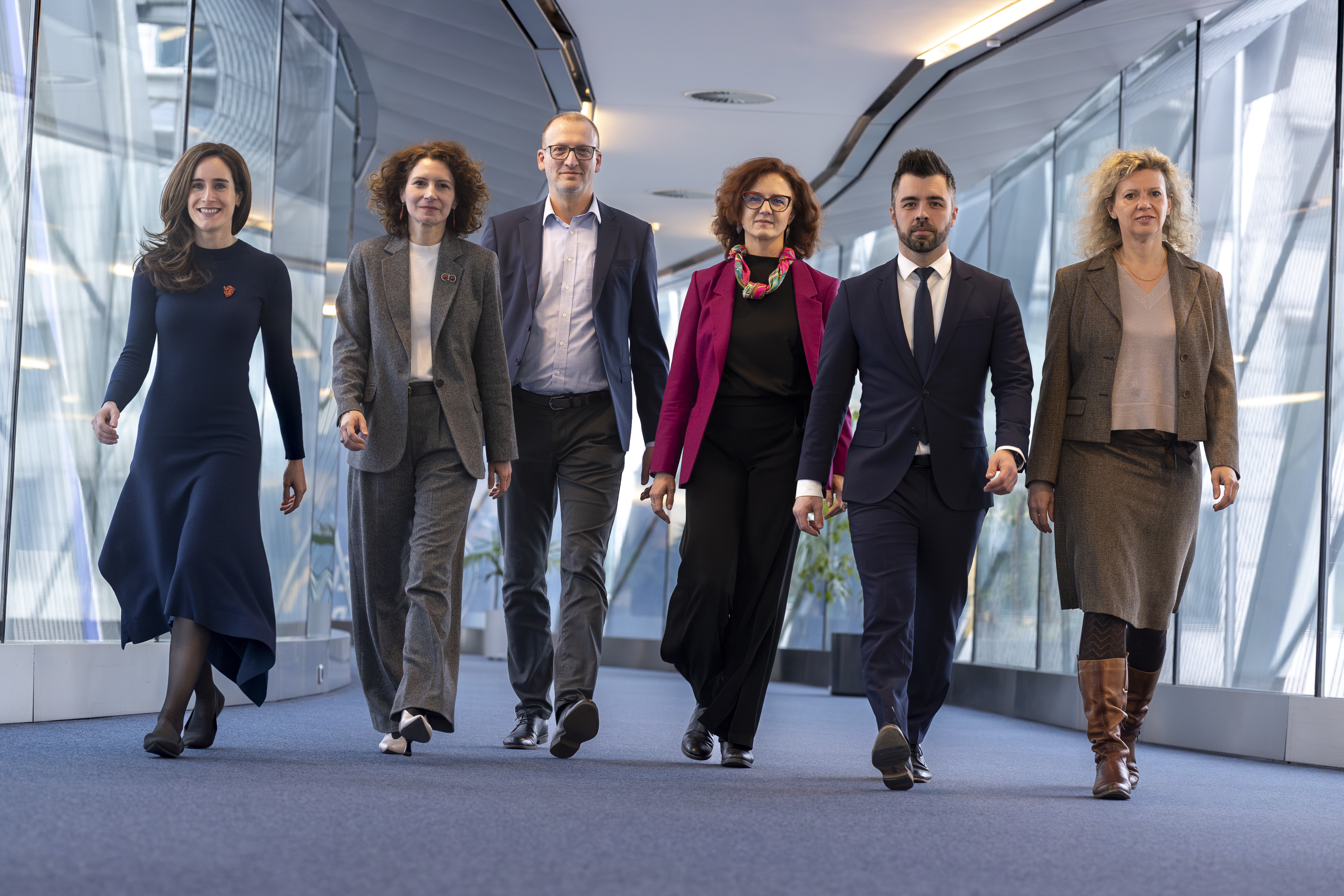
Tisza MEPs (excluding Magyar)

In March 2024, Magyar announced he wished to contest the 2024 European Parliament election in Hungary; however, he could not found his own party due to election deadlines and registration processes. Prior to the announcement of which party Magyar would join, pollsters like the government-aligned Nézőpont Institute suggested that a Magyar-led list could win multiple seats and 13% of the vote. In April, it was announced that Magyar would join Tisza. He was elected as one of the party's vice presidents, as well as the top candidate on Tisza's European Parliament list.

In the European Parliament election in May 2024, Tisza came second with almost 30% of the vote and 7 seats; this performance was characterised by the media as a challenge to the ruling Fidesz of Viktor Orbán. Magyar initially did not take his seat and had said he would not do so during the election campaign. He decided to put it up to a vote on the party's website: over 75% voted in favour of him taking a seat, and as such he was one of the 7 Tisza MEPs.

=== Run-up to the 2026 parliamentary election ===
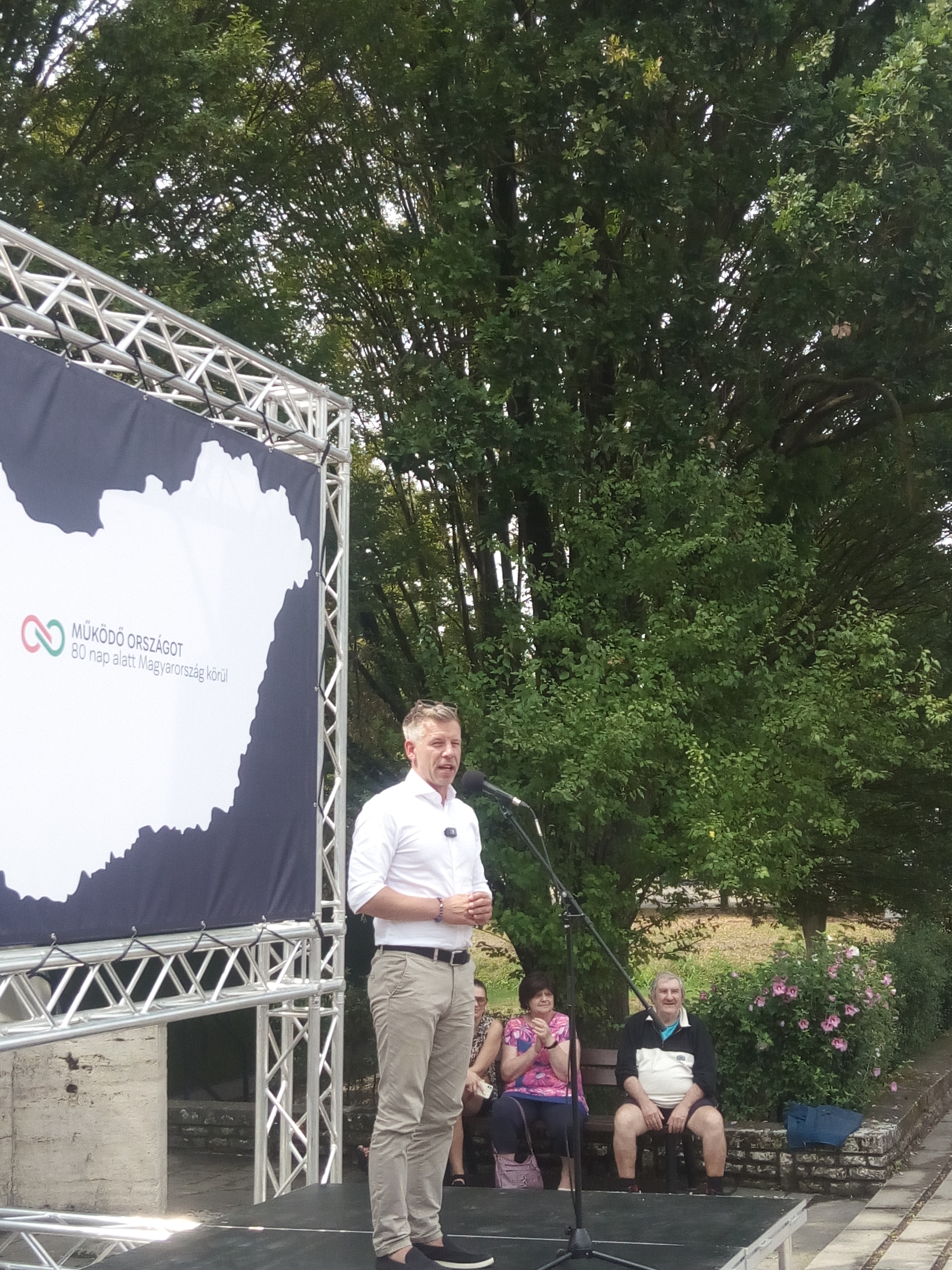
Magyar at a Tisza campaign event in August 2025, in Battonya

==== Grassroots support ====
Following the European Parliament result, Tisza began to build up a membership and a local base, as the party had not had much success prior to Magyar's involvement. In order to build up a base across the country and be able to effectively contest more rural constituencies in the 2026 Hungarian election, the party set up "Tisza Islands" (Tisza Sziget), a network of local supporters and potential candidates. As of January 2025, analysis of social media suggested that there were 208 "islands", with over 20,000 members in total. Moreover, Magyar conducted press stunts such as walking across the country with supporters.

In July 2024, Magyar assumed the leadership of the party from founder Attila Szabó, who was instead given the title of honorary president. In July 2025, Tisza launched Tiszta Hang (meaning "Clear Voice"), which the party said was a newspaper that would be delivered by volunteers in an attempt to reach rural voters. The first copies, of which they printed almost one million, were delivered from the 8–10th August. After reading the first copy, 444.hu claimed that Tiszta Hang was more of a programme booklet than a newspaper.

==== "Voice of the nation" ====
In March 2025, Magyar announced that he would launch an informal referendum questionnaire, asking people 13 questions. The questionnaire could be filled out online or in person, and would inform the party's policy. There were 1,137,266 responses to the questionnaire. Most questions saw over 90% of respondents vote in favour, though the final (+1) question on Ukraine's position in the EU was more contested, with 58% in favour. The full results are as follows:

Number	Question	Result	
Number	Question	Yes %	No %
1	Do you agree with introducing a Pensioner SZÉP Card with a maximum annual value of 200 thousand forints, which can be used for food, medicine and health care?	92.3	7.7
2	Do you agree with reducing the VAT rate on medicines to 0 percent?	92.5	7.5
3	Do you agree that the state should not use budget resources to support private healthcare investments and should provide at least 500 billion forints of extra resources annually for the development of the state healthcare system?	98.3	1.7
4	Do you agree with spending the recovered national wealth on education, healthcare, and rural development?	99.3	0.7
5	Do you agree that the VAT rate for healthy foods should be a maximum of 5 percent?	98.4	1.6
6	Do you agree with a universal reduction in personal income tax to 9 percent?	81.9	18.1
7	Do you agree with the re-introduction of the kata taxation system [one in which business-owners could pay one simplified tax, instead of multiple taxes] in the former areas?	90.7	9.3
8	Do you agree with the imposition of an extra tax on assets above 5 billion forints?	96.1	3.9
9	Do you agree with Hungary remaining a member of the European Union and NATO?	98.7	1.3
10	Do you agree that a Prime Minister should only be able to hold office for two terms, for a maximum of 8 years?	96.5	3.5
11	Do you agree that local governments should regain their powers, institutions and resources in the fields of education, healthcare and social services?	98.8	1.2
12	Do you agree that the Prime Minister's monthly salary should be a maximum of 2.5 million forints and that the income of members of parliament should be reduced by half?	92.1	7.9
13 (+1)	Do you support Ukraine becoming a member of the European Union?	58.2	41.8

==== 2025 Nagykanizsa conference ====
On 12 July, the party held its second congress, in Nagykanizsa. The event was attended by several thousand people. At the congress, the party announced that they would hold closed primaries for all their constituency candidates, with members choosing, in rounds, 1 out of 3 approved candidates. Magyar declared that the party would run independently without any other party. During Magyar's speech to the congress, he set out his plans for if Tisza were to win the 2026 election, saying they would need to act immediately to kickstart the country, with the motto of this work being "System change, peacefully, responsibly." Magyar labelled this plan the "Hungarian New Deal", and it primarily focused on what they would invest the money he argues they can reclaim from the EU on. Much of the policy built upon that voted on in the "voice of the nation" questionnaire. Magyar also announced that the party would hold more events in the countryside, as Tisza is less strong there. He said that he would be touring the country in 80 days, and doing many tours up until the election next year. Reporting a few days after the conference, on 14 July, the BBC said that Tisza had about two million supporters, rivalling the roughly equivalent core base of Fidesz.

==== 2025 partisan primary ====
After a call for candidates in 2024, the party selected 103 of its 106 future candidates for the 2026 parliamentary election in a two-round primary in late 2025. The party put forward 3 nominees in each district (except the district of leader Péter Magyar and 2 other seats) and in the first round all Tisza Island members above the age of 16 could vote. Voting took place via a modified Borda count. In the second round, voting was opened also to all resident citizens above 18 who could vote for either of the two advancing candidates. Winners were announced on 28 November 2025.

=== 2026 parliamentary election ===
During the campaign for the 2026 election, the party adopted the slogan "Now or never!" (Most vagy soha!), a famous phrase from Sándor Petőfi’s Nemzeti dal, a poem Petőfi wrote to inspire the 1848 uprising against the Hapsburgs. In latter stages of the campaign, signs appeared with "or never" crossed out to convey urgency.

Tisza ended Orbán and Fidesz's 16-year tenure in a landslide, winning a two-thirds supermajority in the National Assembly. In so doing, it acquired the power to amend the Constitution of Hungary without the need for support from other parties. Tisza was assured of at least 136 seats, and ultimately won 141 seats after votes from the Hungarian diaspora were counted. In terms of percentage of the Assembly controlled, it is the largest mandate that a Hungarian party has won in a free election. The result closely tracked independent polling that showed Tisza leading Fidesz for almost two years by wide margins, while pro-government pollsters predicted a Fidesz win.

== Ideology and policy ==
Prior to Magyar, Tisza was a minor conservative party, which defined itself as being "ideology-free". Under Magyar, the Tisza Party has been described as "synonymous with Magyar himself", described variously as a "centrist anti-establishment party", and a big-tent organization. While Magyar is a rather right-wing figure, major sections of his voters are liberal and left-wing. The party has avoided taking clear ideological positions to appeal to the widest electoral coalition possible.

More narrowly, it has been defined as a centre-right political party, a member of the European People's Party Group (EPP Group); also as centre-right conservative, liberal-conservative, conservative-liberal, or national conservative.

Magyar chose Tisza, a grassroots party, due to similarities in views about an ideologically neutral centrist grassroot organization. He often spoke about creating a "third political force" in Hungary to abolish the System of National Cooperation (NER), which Fidesz uses to maintain control over society at large. He defended free speech after multiple members were fired from their civil jobs after appearing at demonstrations.

=== Anti-corruption ===
Magyar hosted multiple protests against the "mafia state" and the allegedly corrupt NER. Magyar has claimed that the Fidesz government has been enriching its allies and that a few families ran the entire country. The party has ruled out cooperation with the opposition since it regards them as complicit with the government. To stop the "industrial-scale" corruption, Magyar wishes to take steps such as joining the European Public Prosecutor's Office (EPPO) and making the judiciary independent. In accordance with his campaign pledge, Magyar's government established the National Asset Recovery and Protection Office, whose duty is to identify, track, and recover assets that have been unlawfully removed from public ownership. This would come alongside strengthening checks and balances in the political system, and not prosecuting political opponents. The party also proposed declassifying the agent files from the Communist era to shed light on personal wealth gains during the rapid privatization period in the 1990s.

=== Democracy ===
Magyar has called for the President of Hungary to eventually become a directly-elected office. He has also pledged to abolish the pension and other benefits former presidents receive.

Tisza supports term limits for parliamentary offices and mandatory retirement ages for certain high-ranking judges. To this end, in July 2026, Tisza initiated and passed an amendment to the Fundamental Law capping service as prime minister at eight years and membership in the National Assembly at twelve years. The amendment also reintroduced the mandatory retirement age of seventy for judges of the Constitutional Court. The amendment was written to be retroactive, foreclosing the possibility of Viktor Orbán reassuming the premiership and effectively forcing the President of the Constitutional Court, the Fidesz-appointed Péter Polt, into retirement.

=== Economy and public services ===
Magyar has stated that a top priority for a Tisza government is recovering the €20 billion of EU funds that the European Commission withheld due to the Fidesz-led government breaching EU law on immigration and asylum-seeking. He plans to use these funds to "kick-start" the economy and help smaller businesses. Magyar also supports the creation of national minimums, such as on energy and welfare. Furthermore, Magyar has voiced support for the adoption of the Euro, citing the "stability and predictability" it would give to "the markets, Hungarian entrepreneurs, and Hungarians".

=== Foreign policy ===
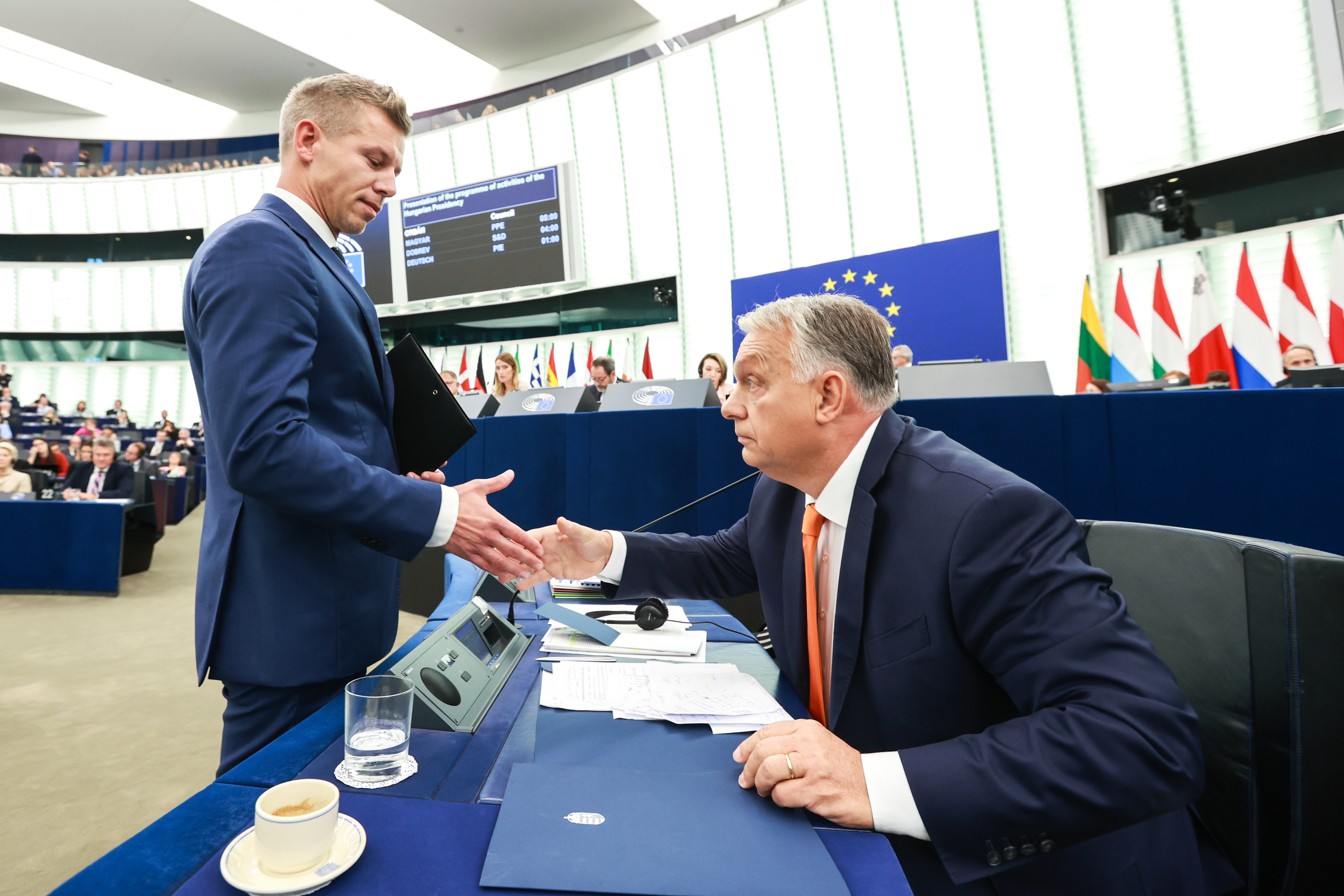
Magyar and Orbán in the European Parliament

The party is pro-European and atlanticist. Analysts have noted that, in the European Parliament, Tisza MEPs have mostly aligned themselves with pro-EU forces while engaging in "tactical alignment" with Fidesz (and thus diverging from the rest of the EPP group) on some questions. Notably, Tisza does not support the arming of Ukraine in the context of its war with Russia, sending troops to Ukraine, nor Ukraine's accelerated accession to the EU.

Nonetheless, in the run-up to the 2026 Hungarian general election, Orbán and Fidesz accused Tisza of being aligned with the interests of the European Commission and Ukraine. Orbán alleged that the EU would use Tisza as its "puppet government" and that Russian state intelligence had found that the Commission hoped to bring Magyar and Tisza to power. Analysts noted that Orbán lacked evidence for these claims, and Magyar described Orbán's reliance on Russian intelligence as foreign election interference.

In December 2025, the National Council of Slovakia criminalized questioning the Beneš decrees, a series of executive orders issued at the end of World War II that allowed the Czechoslovak government to confiscate ethnic Hungarians' property. This decision caused intense controversy in Hungary and became a flashpoint in the electoral contest between Orbán and Magyar due to Orbán's close relationship with Slovak prime minister Robert Fico. In a public letter he wrote to Fico protesting the new law, Magyar used the turn of phrase "Hungarians of the Uplands" (Hungarian: felvidéki magyarok). Due to the association of the historical term Felvidék (lit. 'Uplands', Upper Hungary) with Hungarian irredentism, the Fico government condemned Magyar's language.

=== Immigration ===
Tisza supports strict migration regulations. It has criticized the former Fidesz government for bringing thousands of non-EU migrant workers into Hungary.

In June 2026, Amnesty International Hungary and the Hungarian Helsinki Committee expressed concerns about Tisza's "anti-migrant rhetoric," which Amnesty noted Tisza shared with all other parliamentary parties. Amnesty argued that "a functioning and humane Hungary is a place where the government [...] is able and willing to change the exclusionary rhetoric used by the previous political leadership."

=== Social issues ===
The party has broadly stayed away from talking about or having opinions on particular social issues. Magyar has refused to engage with "culture war" issues and suggested that discussing them entails "falling for [Fidesz] propaganda." The party was accordingly cautious about the 2025 edition of Budapest Pride. It did not react to the event or the Fidesz government's attempted ban thereof until the day of, when Magyar said that unprecedented participation at Pride indicated that Orbán had lost popularity.

The party's platform during the 2026 election campaign did not explicitly address LGBTQ rights in Hungary, but Magyar committed to protecting freedom of assembly in the context of the Fidesz government's attempt to curtail Budapest Pride. During a speech after Tisza's victory, Magyar stated that Hungary should be a country "where no one is stigmatized for loving someone differently than the majority," which analysts saw as indicating a relatively supportive stance on LGBTQ rights. A spokesperson for the police later stated that the Budapest Metropolitan Police had approved the 2026 Budapest Pride parade, which observers and media outlets also viewed as indicating that the Magyar government would be more progressive on LGBTQ+ issues than Fidesz had been.

During the Tisza government, it repealed most provisions of the anti-LGBTQ child protection law that was previously passed during former prime minister Viktor Orbán's tenure in 2021. Magyar has talked about lifting a ban on adoption by same-sex couples.

== Attacks against the party ==
The party has alleged that it has been the victim of attacks and allegations from several figures and organisations, often linked to the Fidesz government.

=== Targeting Magyar ===
In May 2025, a new regulation was passed that changed the rules on asset declaration, which was widely considered to be targeting Magyar and potentially remove his mandate as MEP. As a result, Magyar and all other MEPs made their assets public. In June 2025, a suspension of Magyar's MEP immunity was requested following several prosecution cases against him, including defamation cases tabled by MPs (one from Fidesz, one from Our Homeland Movement), which he claims is politically motivated. Magyar said that he would waive his immunity if the Hungarian government joined the European Public Prosecutor's Office. The Committee on Legal Affairs voted to protect his immunity in September, ahead of a final decision by the European Parliament in October.

In August 2025, during a public event in Gyula, a man attempted to throw an object at Magyar. Magyar initially described it as a beer can, but subsequent reports and video footage indicated it was a packet of sunflower seeds. Also in August, a man used a Facebook comment to call for the shooting of Magyar, writing: "Hátravinni, agyon lőni!!" ("Take him back, shoot him!!"). The police arrested the suspect and conducted a search of his residence, where airgun and live ammunition linked to hunting rifles and pistols were found. It was reported in September 2025 that some analysts and government critics believed Orbán was laying the groundwork to try and disqualify Magyar from the election in 2026.

In February 2026, the webpage radnaimark.hu released a photo of an empty bed titled "Coming soon", which was later re-released with the date 3 August 2024 and the title "Once upon a time". Magyar acknowledged he had consensual sex with his former girlfriend at that location, and remarked that the picture is "a dirty campaign of a Russian style". The photo quickly became a meme.

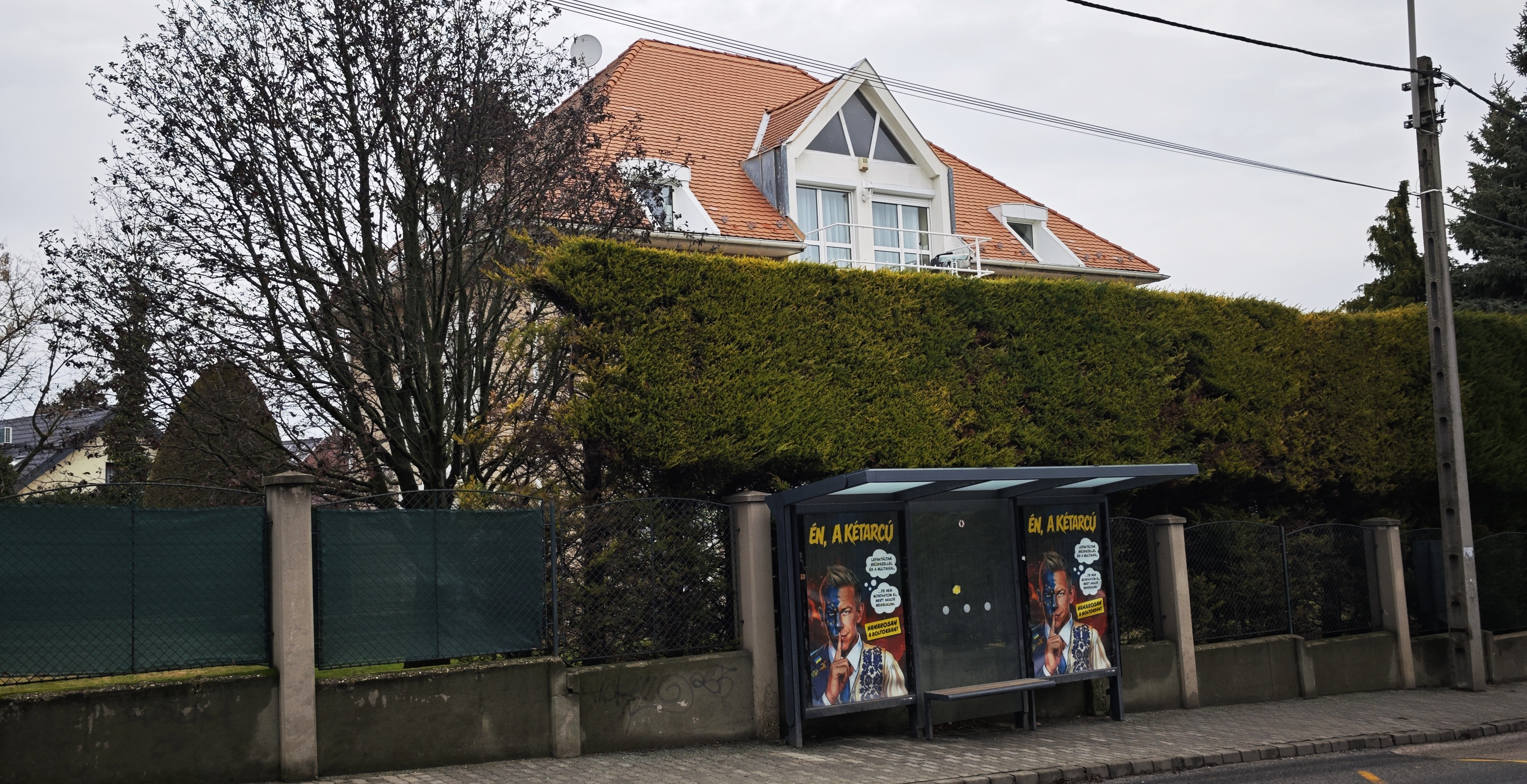
"I, The Two-faced" posters at a bus stop in Budapest

In March, Nemzeti Ellenállási Mozgalom, an organization close to Fidesz, released an AI-generated comic book titled Én, a kétarcú (lit. 'I, the Two-faced'), which depicts Magyar as a demonic, aggressive, cunning, and corrupted figure, who is controlled by Brussels and Kyiv. The European Union and the European People's Party are depicted as mafia organizations. According to the comic book, Magyar wanted to become minister of justice, but his then-wife, Judit Varga, was chosen by Orbán instead. Therefore Magyar decided to take revenge and partnered with EPP, Shell and Erste. Billboards nationwide teased the release of the comic book, which received only 1 star out of 5 on the bookstore Libri.hu.

=== Targeting the party at large ===
During the "voice of the nation" questionnaire, there were several reports that Tisza activists manning public stalls were attacked, which the party claimed was incited by PM Orbán. Magyar also made claims that Fidesz would stage attacks on their own party by figures dressed as Tisza activists. Magyar claimed that the Democratic Alliance of Hungarians in Romania (RMDSZ), acted as spies for Fidesz in the EPP Group in the European Parliament. The party has claimed there have been blackmail attempts against various Tisza politicians. In June 2025, an informal volunteer platform hosted on Discord had a data breach that was leaked to the press, which affected around 500 volunteers. The party claimed that this was a "Russian-style smear campaign". The Discord server was shut down following the incident.

On 14 February, Orbán said that Tisza was "a German product" created by Shell and Erste.

Several independent candidates that ran on constituency lists had unusually similar names with real candidates of the Tisza party, for example Péter Tisza or Péter Magyar (not the leader). These name similarities were meant to confuse voters on the election day.

== Election results ==
=== National Assembly ===
Election	Leader	Constituency			Party list			Seats	+/–	Status
Election	Leader	Votes	%	Place	Votes	%	Place	Seats	+/–	Status
2026	Péter Magyar	3,333,415	55.26	1st	3,385,890	53.18	1st	141 / 199	New	Supermajority

=== European Parliament ===
Election	List leader	Votes	%	Place	Seats	+/−	EP group
2024	Péter Magyar	1,352,699	29.60	2nd	7 / 21	New	EPP

== Leadership ==
=== President ===
No.	President	Took office	Left office	Tenure
1	Attila Szabó	23 October 2020	22 July 2024	3 years, 273 days
2	Péter Magyar	22 July 2024	Incumbent	2 years, 121 days
