= National Assembly (Hungary) =

Unicameral legislature of Hungary

Coordinates: 47°30′26″N 19°02′45″E

National Assembly Országgyűlés
- 2026–2030 legislature

Type
- Type: Unicameral

History
- Founded: 1057 (first recorded); 1608 (bicameralized); 1848 (modern); 1945 (unicameralized); 1990 (current form)

Leadership
- Speaker: Ágnes Forsthoffer, TISZA since 9 May 2026
- Deputy Speakers: Anikó Hallerné Nagy, TISZA; Krisztián Kőszegi, TISZA; Richárd Rák, TISZA; Eszter Vitályos, Fidesz; Csaba Latorcai, KDNP; Dóra Dúró, MH since 9 May 2026
- Leader of largest political group: Andrea Bujdosó, TISZA since 9 May 2026
- Leader of 2nd largest political group: János Bóka, Fidesz since 21 July 2026

Structure
- Seats: 199
- Political groups: Government (Magyar) (141): TISZA (141); Opposition (58): Fidesz–KDNP (52) (Note: Fidesz (44); KDNP (8)); MH (6)

Elections
- Voting system: Partially parallel, partially compensatory voting: 106 FPTP seats; 93 PR seats with 5% electoral threshold (D'Hondt method)
- First election: June 1848 (modern parliament) 25 March and 8 April 1990 (current form)
- Last election: 12 April 2026
- Next election: By May 2030

Meeting place
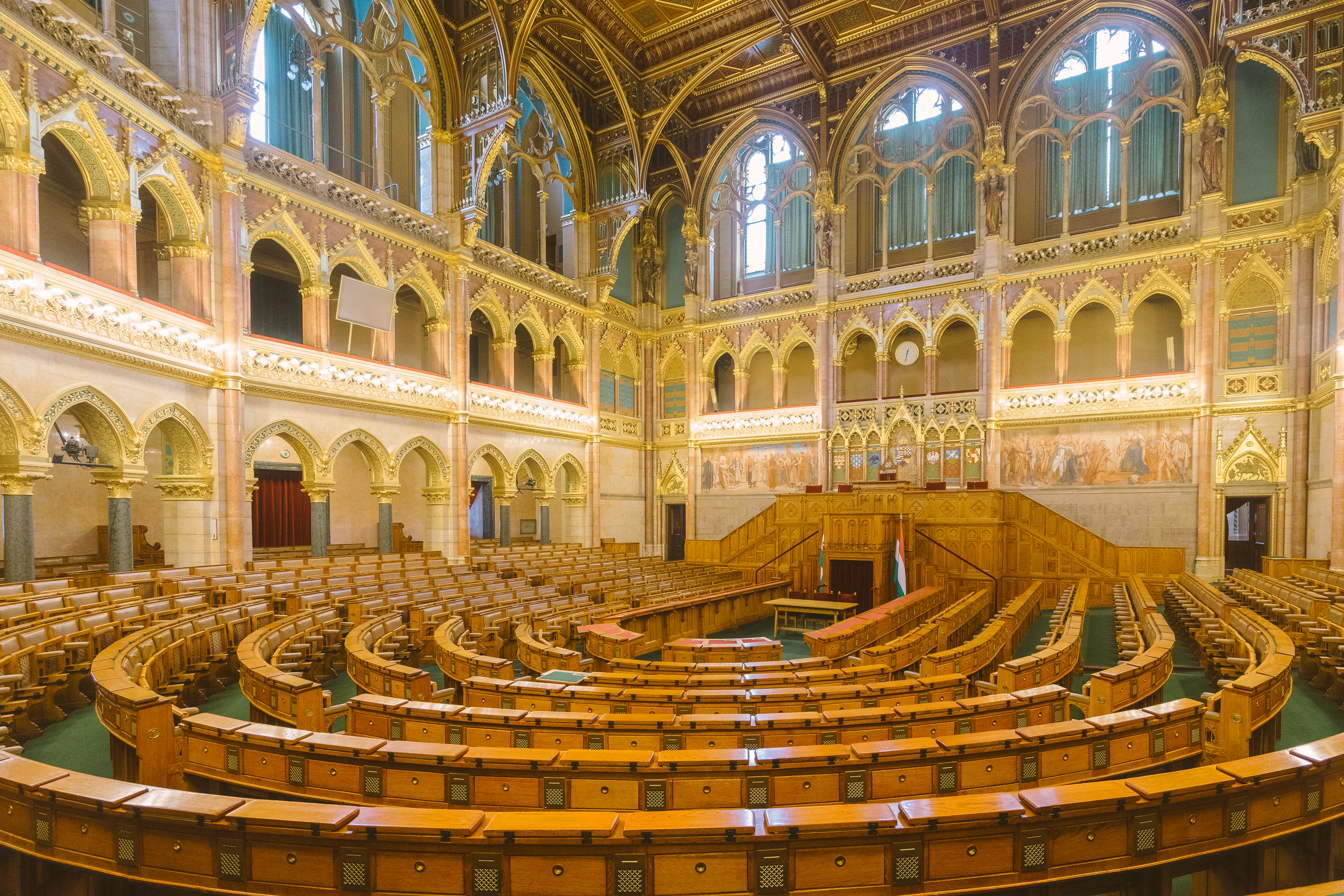
- Hungarian Parliament Building; Lajos Kossuth Square 1 Budapest, H-1055; Hungary

Website
- parlament.hu/national-assembly

The National Assembly (Hungarian: Országgyűlés, lit. 'Country Assembly' [ˈorsaːɡɟyːleːʃ]) is the parliament of Hungary. The unicameral body consists of 199 members elected to four-year terms.

Election of the National Assembly is done using a semi-proportional representation, consisting of a mixed-member majoritarian representation with partial compensation via transfer votes and mixed single vote involving single-member districts and one list vote; parties must win at least 5% of the popular vote in order to gain list seats.

The National Assembly includes 25 standing committees to debate and report on introduced bills and to supervise the activities of the ministers. The Constitutional Court of Hungary has the right to challenge legislation on the grounds of constitutionality. Since 1902, the assembly has met in the Hungarian Parliament Building in Budapest.

== History ==
The Diet of Hungary (Hungarian: Országgyűlés) was a legislative institution in the medieval kingdom of Hungary from the 1290s, and in its successor states, Royal Hungary and the Habsburg kingdom of Hungary throughout the Early Modern period. The name of the legislative body was originally "Parlamentum" during the Middle Ages, the "Diet" expression gained mostly in the Early Modern period. It convened at regular intervals with interruptions during the period of 1527 to 1918, and again until 1946.

In 1608, a bicameral legislature was enacted as the Royal Hungarian Diet, dividing the main board and the lower board (the board of envoys). Members of the main board (the upper house) were the high nobles and high priests (archbishops and bishops). The lower board was attended by representatives of the common nobility, clergy and civil order: elected representatives of the noble county, delegates of the free royal cities and representatives of the lower Church representatives.

Approximately 10% of the total voting age population could vote for the elected delegates of the lower board (5% county nobility, 5% residents of free royal cities). The election of the noble delegates (1 delegate from each county) took place in the county delegate elections, after a long, noisy, courtier campaign, at the county hall. Delegates received voting instructions from county assemblies.

The parliament consisted of about 500 people in the 17th–18th centuries.

The articles of the 1790 diet set out that the diet should meet at least once every 3 years, but, since the diet was called by the Habsburg monarchy, this promise was not kept on several occasions thereafter. As a result of the Austro-Hungarian Compromise, it was reconstituted in 1867.

The Latin term Natio Hungarica ("Hungarian nation") was used to designate the political elite which had participation in the diet, consisting of the nobility, the Catholic clergy, and a few enfranchised burghers, regardless of language or ethnicity. Today's parliament is still called the Országgyűlés, as in royal times, but is called the 'National Assembly' to distance itself from the historical royal diet.

Under communist rule, the National Assembly was defined as the "supreme body of state power" (after 1972: "supreme body of state power and popular representation"). Per the principle of unified power, it was the sole branch of government in Hungary, and all state organs were subordinated to it. Under the Constitution of 1949, initially drafted by the communists, it was vested with great lawmaking and oversight powers. In practice, as with most other communist legislatures, it did little more than ratify decisions already made by the Communist Hungarian Socialist Workers' Party and its Politburo. The Assembly only sat twice a year, for a grand total of six days. The Presidential Council exercised most of the Assembly's powers between sessions, but could not amend the Constitution. The Presidential Council could also issue edicts in lieu of law. On paper, these edicts had to be ratified by the Assembly at its next session to remain in effect, but such ratification was usually a formality.

The liberal democratic character of the Hungarian parliament was reestablished with the fall of the Iron Curtain and the end of the communist dictatorship in 1989. The Assembly's constitutional designation as the highest organ of power was retained after the end of communism and removed only by the Fidesz-drafted Fundamental Law of Hungary in 2012.

== Historical composition of the National Assembly since 1990 ==
MSZP / Párbeszéd / DK / Együtt / LMP / MLP / SZDSZ / Momentum / TISZA / Fidesz / KDNP / MDF / FKGP / MIÉP / Jobbik / MH / Német / Others / Independent
1990 (Note: Between 1990 and 2014 the number of seats were 386.)	33 / 94 / 22 / 21 / 164 / 44 / 2 / 6
1994	209 / 70 / 20 / 22 / 38 / 26 / 1
1998	134 / 24 / 148 / 17 / 48 / 14 / 1
2002	178 / 20 / 164 / 24
2006	190 / 20 / 141 / 23 / 11 / 1
2010	59 / 16 / 227 / 36 / 47 / 1
2014 (Note: Since 2014 the number of seats are 199.)	29 / 1 / 4 / 3 / 5 / 1 / 117 / 16 / 23
2018	15 / 5 / 9 / 1 / 8 / 117 / 16 / 26 / 1 / 1
2022	10 / 6 / 15 / 5 / 10 / 117 / 18 / 10 / 6 / 1 / 1
2026	141 / 44 / 8 / 6
