= Elections in Hungary =

Elections in Hungary are held at two levels: the Central level, in which there are general elections to elect the members of the unicameral National Assembly that occur every 4 years, as well as European Parliament elections held every 5 years; and the so-called self-governmental level, which consists of elections of local authorities (municipal councils, mayors, county assemblies, capital city assembly) and minority self-governmental authorities (on different levels).

There are no other direct elections (the president, for example, is elected indirectly), but there are referendums on both the local and national levels.

== National Assembly elections ==
Following a reform in 2012, general elections reverted to a one-round, two-ballot system. The total number of seats was reduced and regional lists were eliminated. The proportion of single-member seats increased from 45.56% of the total to 53.3%. The first ballot chose MPs for 106 single-member districts using first-past-the-post. The remaining 93 party-list national seats were allocated based on the sum of list votes from the second ballot and 'wasted' votes from the first ballot. 'Wasted' votes in this context are votes that are cast for unsuccessful candidates or surplus votes for winning candidates. This formula for allocating national seats is a cross between a parallel mixed system and a compensatory mixed system.

The 2014 election was the first to be held according to the new system, which included the following significant changes:

- One round instead of two rounds.
- No turnout requirements; formerly, a turnout of 50% was needed for the first round and 25% for the second round.
- The National Assembly included 199 seats, reduced from 386 (i.e. 51.6% of the previous total).
  - 106 constituency seats, reduced from 176; their share increased from 45.6% to 53.3% of total seats.
  - 93 party-list seats, including minority-list seats, reduced from the 210 MMC and levelling seats; their share decreased from 54.4% to 46.7% of all seats.
- A 5% threshold remains for party lists, 10% for joint lists of two parties, 15% for joint lists of three or more parties.
- The quota for ethnic-minority lists to win seats is only one-quarter of the general quota.

Minority lists that do not reach the 5% of all minority-list votes and do not get at least one seat, will be able to send a minority spokesman to the National Assembly, who has the right to speak but not to vote. Practically, only the German and Romani minorities are numerous enough to possibly elect MPs, while the other 13 minorities have spokesmen.

- Constituency borders were changed, partly because of the reduced number of constituencies (from 176 to 106), partly because of the demographic changes in the proportion of the population of constituencies in the last 20 years. In the old system, the population of the smallest constituency was 33077, while the population of the largest one was 98167, which meant that the constituency vote of a person living in larger constituencies was worth one-third of that of a person living in smaller constituencies. In the new system the difference between the population of the largest and smallest constituencies is lower than 30% (79208 and 109955) and the standard deviation of the population of the constituencies has also reduced from 20% to 8%. The average population of constituencies used to be 57089 and will be 94789 in 2014. Constituency borders do not necessarily coincide with city or district borders; however, they have to coincide with county borders and with the border of Budapest (so the 19 counties and Budapest are further divided into constituencies). Budapest used to consist of 32 constituencies and will consist of 18 in 2014.
- Registration - although it had been planned previously - will not be generally required for voting after being found unconstitutional, only those Hungarian citizens will have to register who do not reside in Hungary (do not have Hungarian address card), this registration will be valid for 10 years or until the change of address and will be automatically extended in case of voting (so practically Hungarian citizens outside Hungary will have to re-register only in case of not voting twice or in case of changing home address)

=== Nomination of candidates ===
- All candidates must be at least 18 years old and Hungarian citizens.
- Candidates standing for constituency seats must each have received at least 1000 proposal certificates.
- Parties with candidates standing for election in at least 27 (out of 106) constituencies in at least 9 (out of 19) counties and Budapest may present (national) party lists.
- Each of the legally recognized national minority councils – currently: Armenian, Bulgarian, Croatian, German, Greek, Polish, Romani, Romanian, Rusyn, Serbian, Slovak, Slovenian, and Ukrainian – may present minority lists (one list per council).

=== Voting ===
On Hungarian elections citizens can vote for a party-list (or a minority-list), and in case of residing in Hungary (which is checked by showing the address card) citizens can also vote for a constituency candidate who will be responsible for the local community in the National Assembly.

- At least 18 year old Hungarian citizens with Hungarian residence
  - one vote for a party-list
  - one vote for a constituency candidate
- At least 18 year old Hungarian citizens without Hungarian residence
  - one vote for a party-list
- At least 18 year old Hungarian citizens with Hungarian residence registered as minority voter
  - one vote for a constituency candidate
  - one vote
    - either for a party-list
    - or for a minority-list

==== Implementation of voting ====
- at local polling stations
  - Hungarian citizens with Hungarian residence (address card) staying in Hungary
    - showing the ID card -> being able to vote for a party-list (or a minority-list)
    - showing the address card -> being able to vote for a constituency candidate
- at embassies, consulates
  - Hungarian citizens with Hungarian residence (address card) staying abroad
    - showing the ID card -> being able to vote for a party-list (or a minority-list)
    - showing the address card -> being able to vote for a constituency candidate
- by mail
  - Hungarian citizens without Hungarian address card
    - registering for the elections by mail or electronically (valid for 10 years or until change of residential address, validity automatically extends by 10 years in case of voting), registered citizens receive the voting sheet (only the party-list) by mail, which they fulfill and send back to the election office.

=== Results ===
In case of the 106 constituency seats, the candidate that receives the most votes (not necessarily more than 50%) in the given constituency, obtains the constituency seat and will be responsible for that local region in the National Assembly. In the case of the 93 party-list seats, parties receive seats in proportion to the votes received out of all the party-list and minority-list votes. These numbers of seats obtained by the parties are calculated according to the D'Hondt method after checking out whether the party has reached the 5% threshold out of all the party-list votes and whether the minority has reached the 5% threshold out of all minority votes. If a minority-lists cannot obtain at least one seat then the first candidate on the minority-list will be minority spokesman, who has right to speak in the National Assembly but is not allowed to vote.

It is possible that the same person is a constituency candidate and a party-list candidate in the same time. If this person has obtained the seat in their constituency and would also obtain a seat because of the party-list that they are listed on then the next candidate in the party-list replaces the candidate that already has obtained a constituency seat. So, for example, someone being the 50th on a party-list can obtain a seat in the National Assembly even if their party has only won 30 party-list seats, if at least 20 candidates listed earlier than them win in their local constituency. (this rule has simplified as there is no county level between the constituency level and the national level)

Generally, big parties place their most important (national level) politicians only on the party-lists because these people want to deal only with national-level issues (like becoming minister). They represent citizens who voted for their parties and not the citizens of their local community, which is the responsibility of those MPs that obtain constituency seats. On the other hand, leaders of small parties usually qualify both on their party-lists and in their local constituencies because of maximizing votes; the leader of a small party might be much more famous or much more popular than an ordinary local politician of a big party.

=== By-elections ===
A by-election is an election held to fill a constituency seat that has become vacant between regularly scheduled elections. In case of the vacancy of a party-list seat, the next person on the list that is still interested gets to the National Assembly. This rule has not changed. Note, that by-elections from 2012 are held according to the new system, so only one round is held and no minimum turnout is needed, while the constituencies are the same until 2014.

=== Latest general election ===
Voting was held on 12 April 2026, and ran from 6:00 to 19:00 CEST. At 79.6%, it recorded a significant increase in turnout compared to 2022 and set by a large margin the turnout record since the 1990 Hungarian parliamentary election, which were the first free elections since 1945, overtaking the 2002 Hungarian parliamentary election that ended Orbán's first term as Prime Minister. It had the highest turnout since the 1985 Hungarian parliamentary election, the last election held under the Communist regime of the Hungarian People's Republic, and the results were described as "Hungary's most consequential" since the fall of Communism (rendszerváltás) in 1989. Tisza Party swept Fidesz from power in a landslide victory. Most independent polling since 2024 showed Tisza Party with a clear lead, a margin reflected in the final results. In contrast, pro-government pollsters projected a fifth term for Fidesz. On election night, with the result beyond doubt, Orbán conceded the election.

With all precincts counted, Tisza Party secured 141 seats in the 199-seat National Assembly on 53.2% of the vote, enough for a two-thirds supermajority that would allow it to amend the constitution without the need for support from other parties. While a party or alliance only needs a simple majority of 100 seats to conduct the ordinary business of government, a supermajority of 133 seats is required to change the constitution, a rule enacted by the Orbán government's 2011 constitution. In terms of percentage of the National Assembly controlled, it is the largest mandate that a Hungarian party has ever won in a free election. Fidesz's seat count was more than halved, dropping to 52 seats on 38.6% of the votes. Our Homeland Movement was the only other party projected to have crossed the five percent threshold for parliamentary representation, they secured 6 seats, which is the same number as the last time they got it. Tisza Party was assured of 138 seats in preliminary results. However, as the final votes were counted, including votes of the Hungarian diaspora, Tisza rose to 141 seats, while Fidesz's seat count dropped from 55 to 52 despite overwhelmingly leading among the diaspora. Due to the political polarisation between Fidesz and Tisza Party, as well as the high turnout, Hungary's ethnic minorities lost parliamentary representation.

=== Election results ===
Party	Party-list			Constituency			Total seats	+/–
Party	Votes	%	Seats	Votes	%	Seats	Total seats	+/–
Tisza Party	3,385,890	53.18	45	3,333,415	55.26	96	141	New
Fidesz–KDNP	2,458,337	38.61	42	2,215,225	36.72	10	52	–83
Our Homeland Movement	358,372	5.63	6	345,252	5.72	0	6	0
Democratic Coalition	70,298	1.10	0	65,302	1.08	0	0	–15
Hungarian Two Tailed Dog Party	51,965	0.82	0	38,924	0.65	0	0	0
National Roma Self-Government	19,203	0.30	0				0	0
National Self-Government of Germans	18,419	0.29	0				0	–1
National Self-Government of Croats	1,307	0.02	0				0	0
National Self-Government of Slovaks	902	0.01	0				0	0
National Self-Government of Romanians	512	0.01	0				0	0
National Self-Government of Rusyns	440	0.01	0				0	0
National Self-Government of Ukrainians	379	0.01	0				0	0
National Self-Government of Slovenes	179	0.00	0				0	0
National Self-Government of Greeks	159	0.00	0				0	0
National Self-Government of Poles	147	0.00	0				0	0
National Self-Government of Armenians	116	0.00	0				0	0
National Self-Government of Bulgarians	108	0.00	0				0	0
Jobbik				7,832	0.13	0	0	–7
Hungarian Workers' Party–Solidarity Party				4,187	0.07	0	0	0
Party of Normal Life				328	0.01	0	0	0
National Unification Movement				249	0.00	0	0	0
Party of the Centre				247	0.00	0	0	0
Hungarian Justice and Life Party (Note: The party, despite its name, is not similar to the defunct Hungarian Justice and Life Party.)				196	0.00	0	0	0
LMP – Hungary's Green Party				163	0.00	0	0	–3
Direction – The Future Party				109	0.00	0	0	0
Independents				20,967	0.35	0	0	0
Total	6,366,733	100.00	93	6,032,396	100.00	106	199	0
Valid votes	6,366,733	99.41		6,032,396	99.43			
Invalid/blank votes	37,670	0.59		34,327	0.57			
Total votes	6,404,403	100.00		6,066,723	100.00			
Registered voters/turnout	8,112,646	78.94		7,618,472	79.63			
Source: Nemzeti Választási Iroda

Party vote share
TISZA	53.18%
Fidesz–KDNP	38.61%
MHM	5.63%
DK	1.10%
MKKP	0.82%
Minorities	0.66%

Constituency vote share
TISZA	55.26%
Fidesz–KDNP	36.72%
MHM	5.72%
DK	1.08%
MKKP	0.65%
Others	0.57%

Seat share
TISZA	70.85%
Fidesz–KDNP	26.13%
MHM	3.02%

=== List results ===
The following shows the calculation of the list seats after the election. To this end the list votes and fractional votes of each party above the electoral threshold are taken into account, with the 93 seats being distributed using the D'Hondt method. No list of national minorities were able to obtain a seat because they did not fulfill the lowered quota of 1/372 of the votes. In this election, that threshold was 26,712 votes.

Party	List votes	Fractional votes	Total votes	%	Quotients	Seats
TISZA	3,385,890	1,364,783	4,750,673	47.81	45.68	45
Fidesz–KDNP	2,458,337	1,982,535	4,440,872	44.69	42.70	42
MH	358,372	345,252	703,624	7.08	6.77	6
ORÖ	19,203	N/A	19,203	0.19	N/A	0
MNOÖ/LdU	18,419	N/A	18,419	0.19	N/A	0
Other minority lists	4,249	N/A	4,249	0.04	N/A	0
Divisor: 104,000

==== List members ====
List rank	TISZA		Fidesz–KDNP		MH	
List rank	Name	Result	Name	Result	Name	Result
1	Péter Magyar	Elected for Budapest 3	Viktor Orbán	Elected, list seat 1, declined seat	László Toroczkai	Elected, list seat 1
2	Andrea Rost	Elected for Jász-Nagykun-Szolnok 1	Zsolt Semjén	Elected, list seat 2, declined seat	Dóra Dúró	Elected, list seat 2
3	László Gajdos	Elected for Szabolcs-Szatmár-Bereg 1	László Kövér	Elected, list seat 3, declined seat	István Apáti	Elected, list seat 3
4	Ágnes Forsthoffer	Elected for Veszprém 2	Kinga Gál	Elected, list seat 4, declined seat	Előd Novák	Elected, list seat 4
5	István Kapitány	Elected, list seat 1	Alexandra Szentkirályi	Elected, list seat 1	Zsuzsanna Borvendég	Elected, list seat 1, declined seat
6	Anita Orbán	Elected, list seat 2	Gábor Kubatov	Elected, list seat 6, declined seat	Dávid Dócs	Elected, list seat 5
7	Márk Radnai	Elected for Komárom-Esztergom 2	Lajos Kósa	Elected, list seat 7, declined seat	István Szabadi	Selected as replacement candidate, list seat 6
8	Andrea Bujdosó	Elected for Pest 3	Szilárd Németh	Elected, list seat 8, declined seat		
9	Zoltán Tarr	Elected for Budapest 16	Máté Kocsis	Elected, list seat 2		
10	Erzsébet Csézi	Elected for Borsod-Abaúj-Zemplén 7	János Latorcai	Elected, list seat 10, declined seat		
11	Zsolt Hegedűs	Elected, list seat 3	Sándor Lezsák	Elected, list seat 11, declined seat		
12	Kriszta Bódis	Elected for Budapest 2	István Jakab	Elected, list seat 12, declined seat		
13	Gábor Pósfai	Elected for Pest 2	Zsolt Papp	Elected, list seat 3		
14	Zoltán Tanács	Elected for Budapest 1	István Mohácsy	Elected, list seat 14, declined seat		
15	Éva Göröghné Bocskai	Elected for Hajdú-Bihar 6	Attila Sztojka	Elected, list seat 15, declined seat		
16	Romulusz Ruszin-Szendi	Elected for Hajdú-Bihar 5	Gergely Tapolczai	Elected, list seat 16, declined seat		
17	Zsuzsanna Jakab	Elected for Budapest 12	Zsolt Németh	Elected, list seat 4		
18	Ervin Nagy	Elected for Fejér 4	Gabriella Selmeczi	Elected, list seat 18, declined seat		
19	Dóra Szűcs	Elected, list seat 4	Péter Szijjártó	Elected, list seat 5		
20	György László Velkey	Elected for Budapest 6	János Lázár	Elected, list seat 6		
21	András Kármán	Elected, list seat 5	Balázs Orbán	Elected, list seat 7		
22	Krisztián Kulcsár	Elected for Budapest 10	István Simicskó	Elected, list seat 8		
23	Márton Melléthei-Barna	Elected, list seat 6	Antal Rogán	Elected, list seat 23, declined seat		
24	Erika Jójárt	Elected, list seat 7	Gergely Gulyás	Elected, list seat 9		
25	Vilmos Kátai-Németh	Elected for Budapest 9	János Bóka	Elected, list seat 10		
26	Zoltán Molnár	Elected, list seat 8	Balázs Hidvéghi	Elected, list seat 11		
27	Csongor Kincse	Elected, list seat 9	Ágnes Molnár	Elected, list seat 27, declined seat		
28	Gabriella Borsós	Elected, list seat 10	Hajnalka Juhász	Elected, list seat 12		
29	Zoltán Péter Szafkó	Elected for Nógrád 1	Bence Rétvári	Elected, list seat 13		
30	Kinga Kalázdi-Kerekes	Elected, list seat 11	Erik Bánki	Elected, list seat 30, declined seat		
31	Zsolt Gyuk	Elected, list seat 12	András Demeter	Elected, list seat 31, declined seat		
32	Orsolya Schummer	Elected, list seat 13	Lőrinc Nacsa	Elected, list seat 14		
33	Lőrinc Varga	Elected, list seat 14	Zsolt Kovács	Elected, list seat 33, declined seat		
34	Anikó Sóti	Elected, list seat 15	Gyula Földesi	Elected, list seat 34, declined seat		
35	Richárd Rák	Elected, list seat 16	György Balla	Elected, list seat 15		
36	Márton Hajdu	Elected, list seat 17	Tamás Menczer	Elected, list seat 36, declined seat		
37	Anett Pásztor	Elected, list seat 18	Dávid Héjj	Elected, list seat 16		
38	István Hantosi	Elected, list seat 19	Csaba Latorcai	Elected, list seat 17		
39	István Gyöngyösi	Elected, list seat 20	Miklós Soltész	Elected, list seat 39, declined seat		
40	Edit Sasi-Nagy	Elected, list seat 21	Gyula Budai	Elected, list seat 18		
41	Mihály Balogh	Elected, list seat 22	Zsolt Nyitrai	Elected, list seat 41, declined seat		
42	Martin Császár	Elected, list seat 23	Barna Pál Zsigmond	Elected, list seat 42, declined seat		
43	Ákos Berki	Elected, list seat 24				
44	Krisztián Márk Simon	Elected, list seat 25				
45	Tamás Tóth	Elected, list seat 26				
46	Krisztián Kőszegi	Elected, list seat 27	Anna Lezsák	Selected as replacement candidate, list seat 19		
47	Máté Kiss	Elected, list seat 28	Balázs Németh	Selected as replacement candidate, list seat 20		
48	Gábor Lukács	Elected, list seat 29	Eszter Vitályos	Selected as replacement candidate, list seat 21		
49	Tibor Kaprinyák	Elected, list seat 30	Bence Tuzson	Selected as replacement candidate, list seat 22		
50	Áron Porcher	Elected for Budapest 15				
51	Nikoletta Boda	Elected for Budapest 11	Balázs Hankó	Selected as replacement candidate, list seat 23		
52	Áron Koncz	Elected for Budapest 4				
53	Endre Márton László	Elected for Pest 6				
54	Andrea Perticsné Kácsor	Elected for Pest 10				
55	Balázs Tóthmajor	Elected for Pest 4				
56	Diána Ruzsa	Elected for Baranya 1				
57	Ildikó Éva Sopov	Elected for Komárom-Esztergom 1				
58	Péter Bódis	Elected for Heves 1				
59	Judit Diószegi	Elected for Győr-Moson-Sopron 1				
60	István Bodóczi	Elected for Békés 1				
61	Anna Müller	Elected for Budapest 13				
62	Ildikó Trompler	Elected for Pest 7				
63	Orsolya Miskolczi	Elected for Pest 5				
64	József Jelencsik	Elected for Pest 1				
65	Alexandra Szabó	Elected for Budapest 14				
66	Ferenc Tibor Halmai	Elected for Jász-Nagykun-Szolnok 2				
67	Viktória Bögi	Elected for Fejér 3				
68	Enikő Tompa	Elected for Hajdú-Bihar 2				
69	Mária Gurzó	Elected for Békés 4				
70	Viktória Lőrincz	Elected for Somogy 1				
71	Tímea Barna-Szabó	Elected for Szabolcs-Szatmár-Bereg 6				
72	József Sárosi	Elected for Tolna 1				
73	Ernő Csatári	Elected for Somogy 4				
74	Csaba Attila Bakos	Elected for Somogy 3				
75	Viktória Strompová	Elected, list seat 31				
76	Mihály Borics	Elected for Fejér 2				
77	Attila Csőszi	Elected for Bács-Kiskun 1				
78	Ádám Veres	Elected, list seat 32	Miklós Seszták	Selected as replacement candidate, list seat 24		
79	Tibor Szabó	Elected, list seat 33				
80	Máté Hende	Elected for Pest 13				
81	István Balajti	Elected for Pest 8				
82	Gergely Muhari	Elected for Pest 14				
83	István Weigand	Elected for Budapest 5	Árpád Takács	Selected as replacement candidate, list seat 25		
84	Gabriella Virágh	Elected for Budapest 8	Zsuzsa Máthé	Selected as replacement candidate, list seat 26		
85	Balázs Trentin	Elected for Budapest 7	Gábor Czirbus	Selected as replacement candidate, list seat 27		
86	Renáta Szimon	Elected for Pest 11				
87	Zita Bilisics	Elected for Pest 9				
88	Krisztina Porpáczy	Elected for Győr-Moson-Sopron 5	Zsófia Koncz	Selected as replacement candidate, list seat 28		
89	László Bicskei	Elected, list seat 34				
90	Nikolett Árvay	Elected for Komárom-Esztergom 3				
91	Balázs Varga	Elected for Zala 2				
92	Bence Csontos	Elected for Bács-Kiskun 6				
93	Zsuzsánna Simon	Elected, list seat 35				
94	Zsolt Ráki	Elected for Békés 3				
95	Zsolt Bóka	Elected, list seat 36				
96	Petra Kovács	Elected, list seat 37	Bálint Nagy	Selected as replacement candidate, list seat 29		
97	László Bugya	Elected, list seat 38				
98	Csaba Lovkó	Elected for Zala 3				
99	Norbert Tóth	Elected, list seat 39				
100	Péter Balatincz	Elected for Veszprém 3	László Horváth	Selected as replacement candidate, list seat 30		
101	Péter Járosi	Elected, list seat 40				
102	Dávid Gombár	Elected for Békés 2				
103	Péter Lajos Szakács	Elected for Szabolcs-Szatmár-Bereg 2	Mihály Witzmann	Selected as replacement candidate, list seat 31		
104	Viktória Dicső	Elected for Szabolcs-Szatmár-Bereg 3				
105	Pál Czakó-Czirbus	Elected, list seat 41				
106	Csilla Németh	Elected, list seat 42				
107	Gyula Kovács	Elected for Bács-Kiskun 4				
108	Nándor Horváth	Elected, list seat 43				
109	Balázs Kapronczai	Elected for Baranya 4				
110	Áron Juhász	Elected for Heves 3				
111	János Kiss	Elected for Heves 2				
112	Dávid Gyömbér	Elected, list seat 44				
113	Balázs Havasi	Elected, list seat 45				
118			János Hargitai	Selected as replacement candidate, list seat 32		
121			Róbert Zsigó	Selected as replacement candidate, list seat 33		
122			János Pócs	Selected as replacement candidate, list seat 34		
123			Péter Takács	Selected as replacement candidate, list seat 35		
130			Krisztina Csibi	Selected as replacement candidate, list seat 36		
131			János Bencsik	Selected as replacement candidate, list seat 37		
152			Barbara Hegedűs	Selected as replacement candidate, list seat 38		
158			Béla Radics	Selected as replacement candidate, list seat 39		
170			Miklós Panyi	Selected as replacement candidate, list seat 40		
218			Gábor Szűcs	Selected as replacement candidate, list seat 41		
237			Piroska Szalai	Selected as replacement candidate, list seat 42		

=== Constituency results ===
Constituency	Previous member		Votes						Vote percentage						Turnout	Elected member	
Constituency	Name	Party	TISZA	Fidesz–KDNP	MH	DK	MKKP	Others	TISZA	Fidesz–KDNP	MH	DK	MKKP	Others	Turnout	Name	Party
Bács-Kiskun 1	László Salacz	Fidesz	27,753	21,063	3,611	–	525	–	52.41%	39.78%	6.82%	–	0.99%	–	78.47%	Attila Csőszi	TISZA
Bács-Kiskun 2	Gyula Tamás Szeberényi	Fidesz	32,688	20,373	3,461	452	555	56	56.76%	35.38%	6.01%	0.78%	0.96%	0.10%	80.92%	János Molnár	TISZA
Bács-Kiskun 3	Sándor Font	Fidesz	24,958	20,257	2,952	754	–	377	50.63%	41.09%	5.99%	1.53%	–	0.76%	78.54%	Zsolt Judák	TISZA
Bács-Kiskun 4	Sándor Lezsák	Fidesz	27,197	22,100	3,639	340	–	371	50.70%	41.20%	6.78%	0.63%	–	0.70%	77.07%	Gyula Kovács	TISZA
Bács-Kiskun 5	Gábor Bányai	Fidesz	24,026	19,208	4,058	590	–	196	49.97%	39.95%	8.44%	1.23%	–	0.41%	73.91%	Katalin Karsai-Juhász	TISZA
Bács-Kiskun 6	Róbert Zsigó	Fidesz	24,905	18,396	3,088	399	–	68	53.15%	39.26%	6.59%	0.85%	–	0.15%	76.06%	Bence Csontos	TISZA
Baranya 1	Tamás Mellár	Dialogue	35,434	16,883	2,475	794	439	245	62.97%	30.00%	4.40%	1.41%	0.78%	0.44%	80.12%	Diána Ruzsa	TISZA
Baranya 2	Péter Hoppál	Fidesz	35,893	18,121	3,116	900	460	129	61.23%	30.91%	5.32%	1.54%	0.78%	0.22%	78.64%	Áron Kovács	TISZA
Baranya 3	János Hargitai	KDNP	25,405	23,328	3,033	496	–	199	48.43%	44.47%	5.78%	0.95%	–	0.38%	77.05%	Áron Rózsahegyi	TISZA
Baranya 4	Csaba Nagy	Fidesz	27,914	23,505	2,600	530	306	246	50.66%	42.66%	4.72%	0.96%	0.56%	0.45%	75.39%	Balázs Kapronczai	TISZA
Békés 1	Tamás Herczeg	Fidesz	30,631	18,322	3,364	635	372	–	57.44%	34.36%	6.31%	1.19%	0.70%	–	81.20%	István Bodóczi	TISZA
Békés 2	Béla Dankó	Fidesz	25,975	20,183	3,464	459	285	174	51.39%	39.93%	6.85%	0.91%	0.56%	0.35%	76.69%	Dávid Gombár	TISZA
Békés 3	József Kovács	Fidesz	26,014	20,507	2,585	371	307	59	52.19%	41.14%	5.19%	0.74%	0.62%	0.12%	76.98%	Zsolt Ráki	TISZA
Békés 4	Norbert Erdős	Fidesz	27,499	17,677	3,032	464	–	1,518	54.79%	35.22%	6.04%	0.92%	–	3.03%	74.34%	Mária Gurzó	TISZA
Borsod-Abaúj-Zemplén 1	Katalin Csöbör	Fidesz	32,545	16,921	2,900	1,083	322	406	60.07%	31.23%	5.35%	2.00%	0.59%	0.75%	78.74%	Roland Juhász	TISZA
Borsod-Abaúj-Zemplén 2	János Kiss	Fidesz	31,416	16,260	3,173	498	288	454	60.31%	31.22%	6.09%	0.96%	0.55%	0.87%	76.71%	András Czipa	TISZA
Borsod-Abaúj-Zemplén 3	Gábor Riz	Fidesz	20,399	20,983	2,529	314	185	467	45.46%	46.76%	5.64%	0.70%	0.41%	1.04%	67.07%	Gábor Csuzda	Fidesz
Borsod-Abaúj-Zemplén 4	Zoltán Demeter	Fidesz	27,675	19,506	3,464	522	–	107	53.95%	38.06%	6.76%	1.02%	–	0.21%	72.52%	Csaba Hatala-Orosz	TISZA
Borsod-Abaúj-Zemplén 5	Richárd Hörcsik	Fidesz	25,284	21,912	2,284	327	198	270	50.29%	43.58%	4.54%	0.65%	0.39%	0.54%	72.53%	László Lontay	TISZA
Borsod-Abaúj-Zemplén 6	Zsófia Koncz	Fidesz	28,528	24,086	2,563	378	–	166	51.20%	43.23%	4.60%	0.68%	–	0.31%	76.27%	Zoltán Bihari	TISZA
Borsod-Abaúj-Zemplén 7	András Tállai	Fidesz	29,812	22,217	3,302	357	309	211	53.04%	39.53%	5.87%	0.64%	0.55%	0.38%	76.31%	Erzsébet Csézi	TISZA
Budapest 1	Antal Csárdi	Independent (Note: Antal Csárdi was originally elected as a candidate of LMP – Hungary's Green Party (part of United for Hungary) but left its parliamentary group in 2025 and remained independent.)	37,803	18,391	1,948	978	770	66	63.05%	30.67%	3.25%	1.28%	1.63%	0.11%	81.60%	Zoltán Tanács	TISZA
Budapest 2	Vacant		35,772	16,512	1,979	582	717	558	63.80%	29.45%	3.44%	1.04%	1.28%	0.99%	73.75%	Kriszta Bódis	TISZA
Budapest 3	Miklós Hajnal	Momentum	43,112	20,248	2,315	860	1,112	67	63.67%	29.90%	3.42%	1.27%	1.64%	0.10%	86.76%	Péter Magyar	TISZA
Budapest 4	Bence Tordai	Dialogue	45,212	19,994	2,103	990	819	–	65.41%	28.93%	3.04%	1.18%	1.43%	–	86.48%	Áron Koncz	TISZA
Budapest 5	Lajos Oláh	DK	42,668	14,769	2,344	1,578	875	–	68.59%	23.74%	3.77%	2.54%	1.36%	–	81.27%	István Weigand	TISZA
Budapest 6	András Jámbor	Dialogue	33,953	15,612	2,825	–	730	10,207	53.62%	24.66%	4.46%	1.15%	–	16.12%	81.38%	György László Velkey	TISZA
Budapest 7	Dezső Hiszékeny	MSZP	38,809	17,340	2,561	1,287	639	305	63.68%	28.45%	4.20%	2.11%	1.05%	0.50%	81.28%	Balázs Trentin	TISZA
Budapest 8	Ákos Hadházy	Independent (Note: Ákos Hadházy was originally elected as a candidate of Momentum Movement (part of United for Hungary) but did not join to its parliamentary group after the election and remained independent.)	40,918	18,843	3,184	–	1,007	277	63.71%	29.34%	4.96%	–	1.57%	0.43%	81.59%	Gabriella Virágh	TISZA
Budapest 9	Gergely Arató	DK	36,812	17,538	3,164	1,014	758	134	61.98%	29.50%	5.32%	1.71%	1.27%	0.23%	79.59%	Vilmos Kátai-Németh	TISZA
Budapest 10	Tímea Szabó	Dialogue	41,542	18,829	3,277	1,184	914	–	63.19%	28.64%	4.98%	1.80%	1.39%	–	85.72%	Krisztián Kulcsár	TISZA
Budapest 11	László Varju	DK	43,122	18,685	3,214	1,228	823	–	64.29%	27.86%	4.79%	1.83%	1.23%	–	84.79%	Nikoletta Boda	TISZA
Budapest 12	Balázs Barkóczi	DK	41,359	16,505	2,909	2,625	877	–	64.35%	25.68%	4.53%	4.08%	1.36%	–	81.98%	Zsuzsanna Jakab	TISZA
Budapest 13	Zoltán Vajda	MSZP	38,873	17,638	3,758	2,564	802	81	61.27%	27.37%	5.92%	4.04%	1.26%	0.13%	83.19%	Anna Müller	TISZA
Budapest 14	Mónika Dunai	Fidesz	40,491	20,990	2,580	785	580	423	61.53%	31.89%	3.93%	1.19%	0.81%	0.64%	85.48%	Alexandra Szabó	TISZA
Budapest 15	Ágnes Kunhalmi	MSZP	41,523	20,752	3,386	1,121	666	182	61.40%	30.68%	5.01%	1.66%	0.98%	0.27%	85.62%	Áron Porcher	TISZA
Budapest 16	István Hiller	MSZP	40,693	20,127	3,514	793	674	2,572	59.00%	29.82%	5.17%	1.18%	0.99%	3.76%	81.86%	Zoltán Tarr	TISZA
Budapest 17	Szabolcs Szabó	Momentum	Constituency abolished														
Budapest 18	Endre Tóth	Momentum	Constituency abolished														
Csongrád-Csanád 1	Sándor Szabó	MSZP	44,478	16,030	3,549	758	739	–	67.85%	24.45%	5.41%	1.16%	1.13%	–	80.32%	Péter Stumpf	TISZA
Csongrád-Csanád 2	Béla Mihálffy	KDNP	36,102	20,169	6,231	549	624	–	56.64%	31.72%	9.80%	0.86%	0.98%	–	79.82%	Attila Gajda	TISZA
Csongrád-Csanád 3	Sándor Farkas	Fidesz	30,970	20,812	5,492	3,032	454	118	50.87%	34.19%	9.02%	4.98%	0.75%	0.19%	78.81%	Bence Bárkányi	TISZA
Csongrád-Csanád 4	János Lázár	Fidesz	35,419	20,188	3,658	641	425	362	58.36%	33.26%	6.03%	1.06%	0.70%	0.60%	80.09%	Gábor Ferenczi	TISZA
Fejér 1	Tamás Vargha	Fidesz	32,654	21,032	3,157	876	709	139	55.75%	35.91%	5.39%	1.50%	1.21%	0.24%	84.07%	Béla Csiszár	TISZA
Fejér 2	Gábor Törő	Fidesz	29,534	20,033	3,644	533	544	491	53.91%	36.57%	6.65%	0.97%	0.99%	0.89%	83.19%	Mihály Borics	TISZA
Fejér 3	Zoltán Tessely	Fidesz	31,342	22,225	2,995	610	523	58	54.27%	38.48%	5.19%	0.91%	1.06%	0.10%	83.82%	Viktória Bögi	TISZA
Fejér 4	Lajos Mészáros	Fidesz	31,758	17,199	2,927	–	423	189	60.50%	32.76%	5.58%	–	0.81%	0.36%	79.15%	Ervin Nagy	TISZA
Fejér 5	Gábor Varga	Fidesz	21,981	23,088	3,426	418	340	–	44.70%	46.79%	6.97%	0.85%	0.69%	–	75.66%	Gábor Varga	Fidesz
Győr-Moson-Sopron 1	Róbert Balázs Simon	Fidesz	32,318	17,568	2,748	546	437	52	60.22%	32.73%	5.12%	1.02%	0.81%	0.10%	82.09%	Judit Diószegi	TISZA
Győr-Moson-Sopron 2	Ákos Kara	Fidesz	33,263	22,419	3,788	586	443	142	54.86%	36.96%	6.25%	0.97%	0.73%	0.23%	83.23%	András Néher	TISZA
Győr-Moson-Sopron 3	Alpár Gyopáros	Fidesz	25,509	26,151	2,934	269	–	283	46.26%	47.42%	5.32%	0.49%	–	0.52%	83.25%	Alpár Gyopáros	Fidesz
Győr-Moson-Sopron 4	Attila Barcza	Fidesz	33,152	25,467	3,660	707	–	681	52.07%	40.00%	5.75%	1.11%	–	1.07%	85.15%	Anikó Hallerné Nagy	TISZA
Győr-Moson-Sopron 5	István Nagy	Fidesz	34,231	26,435	3,316	433	470	–	52.76%	40.74%	5.11%	0.67%	0.72%	–	82.98%	Krisztina Porpáczy	TISZA
Hajdú-Bihar 1	Lajos Kósa	Fidesz	31,991	17,839	2,825	533	450	122	59.50%	33.18%	5.25%	0.99%	0.84%	0.24%	82.93%	Zsolt Tárkányi	TISZA
Hajdú-Bihar 2	László Pósán	Fidesz	32,046	19,276	2,672	472	427	189	58.18%	35.00%	4.85%	0.86%	0.78%	0.34%	79.68%	Enikő Tompa	TISZA
Hajdú-Bihar 3	László Tasó	Fidesz	29,552	24,838	2,920	343	293	95	50.92%	42.79%	5.03%	0.59%	0.50%	0.16%	74.99%	László Csák	TISZA
Hajdú-Bihar 4	István Vitányi	Fidesz	21,800	23,029	2,723	305	242	60	45.27%	47.82%	5.65%	0.63%	0.50%	0.12%	72.60%	István Vitányi	Fidesz
Hajdú-Bihar 5	Sándor Bodó	Fidesz	25,752	22,281	3,034	335	–	103	49.99%	43.26%	5.89%	0.65%	–	0.20%	75.91%	Romulusz Ruszin-Szendi	TISZA
Hajdú-Bihar 6	István Tiba	Fidesz	26,938	19,891	3,984	756	–	–	52.24%	38.57%	7.73%	1.47%	–	–	76.25%	Éva Göröghné Bocskai	TISZA
Heves 1	Gábor Pajtók	Fidesz	35,073	23,111	3,428	435	390	712	54.33%	37.70%	5.53%	0.72%	0.61%	1.13%	79.65%	Péter Bódis	TISZA
Heves 2	László Horváth	Fidesz	29,694	22,789	3,480	587	333	604	51.65%	39.64%	6.05%	1.02%	0.58%	1.05%	78.26%	János Kiss	TISZA
Heves 3	Zsolt Szabó	Fidesz	30,687	24,105	4,861	431	–	104	50.99%	40.05%	8.08%	0.72%	–	0.17%	77.34%	Áron Juhász	TISZA
Jász-Nagykun-Szolnok 1	Mária Kállai	Fidesz	35,110	19,362	3,979	699	437	84	58.84%	32.45%	6.67%	1.17%	0.73%	0.14%	80.33%	Andrea Rost	TISZA
Jász-Nagykun-Szolnok 2	János Pócs	Fidesz	27,076	21,754	3,144	320	–	514	51.27%	41.19%	5.95%	0.61%	–	0.97%	76.43%	Ferenc Tibor Halmai	TISZA
Jász-Nagykun-Szolnok 3	Sándor F. Kovács	Fidesz	24,362	24,638	2,828	373	–	167	46.52%	47.05%	5.40%	0.71%	–	0.32%	73.06%	Sándor F. Kovács	Fidesz
Jász-Nagykun-Szolnok 4	Zsolt Herczeg	Fidesz	28,857	19,879	3,764	392	–	371	54.18%	37.32%	7.07%	0.74%	–	0.70%	75.11%	Csongor Farkas	TISZA
Komárom-Esztergom 1	János Bencsik	Fidesz	36,785	20,778	2,581	857	510	–	59.80%	33.78%	4.20%	1.39%	0.83%	–	79.86%	Ildikó Éva Sopov	TISZA
Komárom-Esztergom 2	Gábor Erős	Fidesz	36,344	23,133	3,475	559	414	–	56.85%	36.19%	5.44%	0.87%	0.65%	–	79.56%	Márk Radnai	TISZA
Komárom-Esztergom 3	Judit Czunyi-Bertalan	Fidesz	34,000	25,061	4,050	539	467	–	53.03%	39.09%	6.32%	0.84%	0.73%	–	79.58%	Nikolett Árvay	TISZA
Nógrád 1	Zsolt Becsó	Fidesz	28,081	21,219	4,176	–	–	346	52.17%	39.42%	7.76%	–	–	0.64%	75.65%	Zoltán Péter Szafkó	TISZA
Nógrád 2	Mihály Balla	Fidesz	26,207	26,478	5,852	451	–	334	44.22%	44.58%	9.87%	0.76%	–	0.56%	77.49%	Mihály Balla	Fidesz
Pest 1	András Aradszki	KDNP	40,100	25,518	3,606	815	672	–	60.11%	32.26%	5.41%	1.22%	1.01%	–	84.14%	József Jelencsik	TISZA
Pest 2	Tamás Menczer	Fidesz	42,204	20,206	3,350	738	683	–	62.82%	30.08%	4.99%	1.10%	1.02%	–	86.64%	Gábor Pósfai	TISZA
Pest 3	Eszter Vitályos	Fidesz	40,789	23,798	4,110	483	715	143	58.24%	33.98%	5.87%	0.69%	1.02%	0.20%	85.97%	Andrea Bujdosó	TISZA
Pest 4	Bence Rétvári	KDNP	35,920	23,234	3,930	801	625	72	55.62%	35.98%	6.09%	1.24%	0.97%	0.11%	85.10%	Balázs Tóthmajor	TISZA
Pest 5	Bence Tuzson	Fidesz	40,500	19,988	3,192	768	664	114	62.09%	30.64%	4.89%	1.18%	1.18%	0.18%	86.20%	Orsolya Miskolczi	TISZA
Pest 6	László Vécsey	Fidesz	39,981	21,623	3,369	542	504	–	60.55%	32.76%	5.10%	0.82%	0.76%	–	86.29%	Endre Márton László	TISZA
Pest 7	Lajos Szűcs	Fidesz	32,478	23,779	3,914	715	562	–	52.85%	38.70%	6.37%	1.16%	0.91%	–	80.89%	Ildikó Trompler	TISZA
Pest 8	Zoltán Bóna	Fidesz	33,852	18,897	3,545	518	506	182	58.87%	32.86%	6.17%	0.90%	0.88%	0.31%	82.04%	István Balajti	TISZA
Pest 9	György Czerván	Fidesz	32,930	22,330	4,395	592	444	126	54.15%	36.72%	7.23%	0.97%	0.73%	0.21%	80.43%	Zita Bilisics	TISZA
Pest 10	Tibor Pogácsás	Fidesz	37,793	18,215	3,353	775	583	216	62.11%	29.83%	5.49%	1.27%	0.95%	0.35%	82.39%	Andrea Perticsné Kácsor	TISZA
Pest 11	Károly Pánczél	Fidesz	33,592	23,314	3,896	741	540	–	54.13%	37.57%	6.28%	1.19%	0.84%	–	83.36%	Renáta Szimon	TISZA
Pest 12	László Földi	KDNP	28,018	22,878	4,066	460	387	–	50.20%	40.99%	7.29%	0.82%	0.69%	–	76.09%	György Polgár	TISZA
Pest 13	New constituency		26,676	20,912	6,097	348	323	161	48.93%	38.36%	11.18%	0.64%	0.59%	0.30%	78.40%	Máté Hende	TISZA
Pest 14	New constituency		28,878	22,157	4,256	558	–	–	51.71%	39.67%	7.62%	1.00%	–	–	76.66%	Gergely Muhari	TISZA
Somogy 1	Attila Gelencsér	Fidesz	27,023	15,832	3,242	545	270	128	57.45%	33.66%	6.89%	1.16%	0.57%	0.27%	80.07%	Viktória Lőrincz	TISZA
Somogy 2	László Szászfalvi	KDNP	19,785	17,581	1,864	511	–	1,872	47.55%	42.25%	4.48%	1.23%	–	4.50%	73.67%	József Benke	TISZA
Somogy 3	József Attila Móring	KDNP	22,647	20,625	2,811	521	–	305	48.28%	43.97%	5.99%	1.11%	–	0.65%	77.53%	Csaba Attila Bakos	TISZA
Somogy 4	Mihály Witzmann	Fidesz	25,803	21,747	2,300	598	375	197	49.87%	43.23%	4.57%	1.19%	0.75%	0.40%	79.65%	Ernő Csatári	TISZA
Szabolcs-Szatmár-Bereg 1	Tünde Szabó	Fidesz	37,691	17,264	2,508	468	259	–	64.77%	29.67%	4.31%	0.80%	0.45%	–	81.45%	László Gajdos	TISZA
Szabolcs-Szatmár-Bereg 2	Győző Vinnai	Fidesz	27,888	21,224	2,957	384	–	–	53.17%	40.46%	5.64%	0.73%	–	–	74.69%	Péter Lajos Szakács	TISZA
Szabolcs-Szatmár-Bereg 3	Miklós Seszták	KDNP	28,053	24,485	2,506	446	–	275	50.31%	43.91%	4.49%	0.80%	–	0.49%	74.39%	Viktória Dicső	TISZA
Szabolcs-Szatmár-Bereg 4	Attila Tilki	Fidesz	21,670	25,166	2,059	262	–	613	43.54%	50.56%	4.14%	0.53%	–	1.23%	71.96%	Attila Tilki	Fidesz
Szabolcs-Szatmár-Bereg 5	Sándor Kovács	Fidesz	22,074	25,410	3,262	317	–	100	43.14%	49.66%	6.38%	0.62%	–	0.20%	72.94%	Sándor Kovács	Fidesz
Szabolcs-Szatmár-Bereg 6	Miklós Simon	Fidesz	24,831	23,713	2,552	196	225	314	47.91%	45.75%	4.92%	0.38%	0.43%	0.60%	74.44%	Tímea Barna-Szabó	TISZA
Tolna 1	István Horváth	Fidesz	23,026	17,654	3,224	431	280	36	51.57%	39.54%	7.22%	0.97%	0.63%	0.08%	78.76%	József Sárosi	TISZA
Tolna 2	Krisztina Csibi	Fidesz	20,087	19,433	3,113	359	–	131	46.58%	45.07%	7.22%	0.83%	–	0.30%	77.15%	Gábor Szijjártó	TISZA
Tolna 3	János Süli	KDNP	20,880	19,987	2,662	416	–	87	47.42%	45.39%	6.05%	0.94%	–	0.20%	78.10%	Tamás Cseh	TISZA
Vas 1	Vacant		31,847	21,558	2,652	–	491	–	56.32%	38.12%	4.69%	–	0.87%	–	84.73%	Róbert Rápli	TISZA
Vas 2	Péter Ágh	Fidesz	25,452	25,700	3,069	440	–	909	45.79%	46.26%	5.52%	0.79%	–	1.64%	83.62%	Péter Ágh	Fidesz
Vas 3	Zsolt V. Németh	Fidesz	23,226	26,186	3,220	419	–	165	43.64%	49.21%	6.05%	0.79%	–	0.31%	82.45%	Zsolt V. Németh	Fidesz
Veszprém 1	Péter Ovádi	Fidesz	33,205	20,294	2,871	516	510	64	57.79%	35.32%	5.00%	0.90%	0.89%	0.11%	83.77%	Levente Gáspár	TISZA
Veszprém 2	Károly Kontrát	Fidesz	34,477	21,304	3,336	538	457	72	57.29%	35.40%	5.54%	0.89%	0.76%	0.12%	82.26%	Ágnes Forsthoffer	TISZA
Veszprém 3	Tibor Navracsics	KDNP (Note: Tibor Navracsics was originally elected as a candidate of Fidesz (part of Fidesz–KDNP) but left its parliamentary group in 2022 and joined to the Christian Democratic People's Partys' one.)	28,223	20,749	2,396	535	–	359	54.00%	39.70%	4.58%	1.02%	–	0.69%	80.43%	Péter Balatincz	TISZA
Veszprém 4	Vacant		25,455	22,881	3,028	674	277	79	48.58%	43.67%	5.78%	1.29%	0.53%	0.15%	79.34%	Szilvia Ujvári	TISZA
Zala 1	László Vigh	Fidesz	30,995	24,981	2,906	465	393	392	51.54%	41.54%	4.83%	0.77%	0.65%	0.65%	83.36%	Márta Nagy	TISZA
Zala 2	Bálint Nagy	Fidesz	27,981	25,863	3,327	483	400	144	48.08%	44.44%	5.72%	0.83%	0.69%	0.25%	80.39%	Balázs Varga	TISZA
Zala 3	Péter Cseresnyés	Fidesz	30,369	20,282	3,297	793	–	111	55.37%	36.98%	6.01%	1.45%	–	0.20%	79.51%	Csaba Lovkó	TISZA

=== Party list results by county, postal, foreign and absentee votes ===

Tisza Party swept every county in the list voting, as well as securing Budapest, where it recorded its best result at 63.9% of the vote. Such a performance reflected Budapest's status as the liberal capital, and mirrored the city's vote for the United for Hungary bloc in 2022. The party also performed strongly in the southern Csongrád-Csanád County, where Fidesz lost the most ground compared to 2022, and in the Pest County around the national capital. Conversely, Fidesz recorded its best national result in the eastern Szabolcs–Szatmár–Bereg County, securing 43.7% of the vote; however, they performed significantly better in the postal voting among the Hungarian diaspora, winning 84.2% of the vote. Despite the large margin of victory for Fidesz, the diaspora vote shifted away from the bloc, reportedly by some ten percent of the vote. By contrast, Tisza Party performed strongest among voters casting ballots at Hungarian foreign representations, primarily Hungarian citizens living or working in Western European countries, and among absentee voters voting away from their registered address inside Hungary, taking a combined 72.5% of the vote in this category. Finally, Our Homeland Movement, a far-right party that was seen as a potential kingmaker going into the election, came in third, performing the best in the northern Nógrád County with 7.4% of the vote.

County	TISZA	Fidesz–KDNP	MH	DK	MKKP
Bács-Kiskun	52.34%	39.07%	6.88%	0.99%	0.72%
Baranya	56.94%	35.58%	5.38%	1.36%	0.74%
Békés	55.03%	36.88%	6.45%	0.99%	0.64%
Borsod–Abaúj–Zemplén	54.79%	37.69%	5.95%	1.01%	0.56%
Budapest	63.87%	28.41%	4.60%	1.70%	1.42%
Csongrád-Csanád	59.92%	31.29%	6.72%	1.17%	0.90%
Fejér	53.99%	37.59%	6.26%	1.20%	0.97%
Győr–Moson–Sopron	52.83%	39.37%	6.08%	0.95%	0.76%
Hajdú–Bihar	53.42%	39.09%	5.92%	0.90%	0.68%
Heves	53.24%	38.29%	6.86%	1.04%	0.57%
Jász–Nagykun–Szolnok	52.94%	38.76%	6.68%	0.99%	0.62%
Komárom-Esztergom	56.46%	35.55%	5.94%	1.26%	0.79%
Nógrád	48.16%	42.90%	7.37%	1.06%	0.51%
Pest	57.23%	34.52%	6.31%	1.03%	0.92%
Somogy	51.70%	40.76%	5.69%	1.23%	0.62%
Szabolcs-Szatmár-Bereg	50.21%	43.72%	4.84%	0.80%	0.43%
Tolna	48.91%	43.06%	6.49%	0.98%	0.56%
Vas	48.96%	43.36%	5.87%	1.09%	0.72%
Veszprém	54.52%	37.25%	6.18%	1.22%	0.84%
Zala	51.80%	40.23%	6.12%	1.14%	0.70%
Total in Hungary	55.76%	36.33%	5.90%	1.16%	0.85%
Foreign and absentee voters	72.48%	21.60%	4.24%	0.67%	1.01%
Postal votes	13.82%	84.23%	1.45%	0.16%	0.35%
Total	53.53%	38.87%	5.67%	1.11%	0.82%

=== Party list results by settlement type ===
Settlement type	TISZA	Fidesz–KDNP	MH	DK	MKKP
Village	46.95%	44.89%	6.66%	0.86%	0.63%
Large village	50.05%	41.63%	6.73%	0.89%	0.69%
City	55.52%	36.56%	6.14%	1.07%	0.72%
City with county rights	59.81%	32.48%	5.64%	1.24%	0.83%
County seat, city with county rights	60.87%	31.44%	5.52%	1.30%	0.87%
Capital	63.87%	28.41%	4.60%	1.70%	1.42%

=== Party list results by settlement size ===
Settlement size	TISZA	Fidesz-KDNP	MH	DK	MKKP
Budapest	63.87%	28.41%	4.60%	1.70%	1.42%
100,000–	61.85%	30.65%	5.40%	1.22%	0.89%
50,000–100,000	59.27%	32.78%	5.67%	1.39%	0.89%
20,000–50,000	59.83%	32.31%	5.85%	1.22%	0.80%
5,000–20,000	54.61%	37.37%	6.30%	1.01%	0.71%
1,000–5,000	48.51%	43.32%	6.66%	0.89%	0.63%
500–1,000	44.22%	47.80%	6.55%	0.85%	0.58%
0–500	41.88%	50.27%	6.38%	0.85%	0.62%

=== Turnout ===
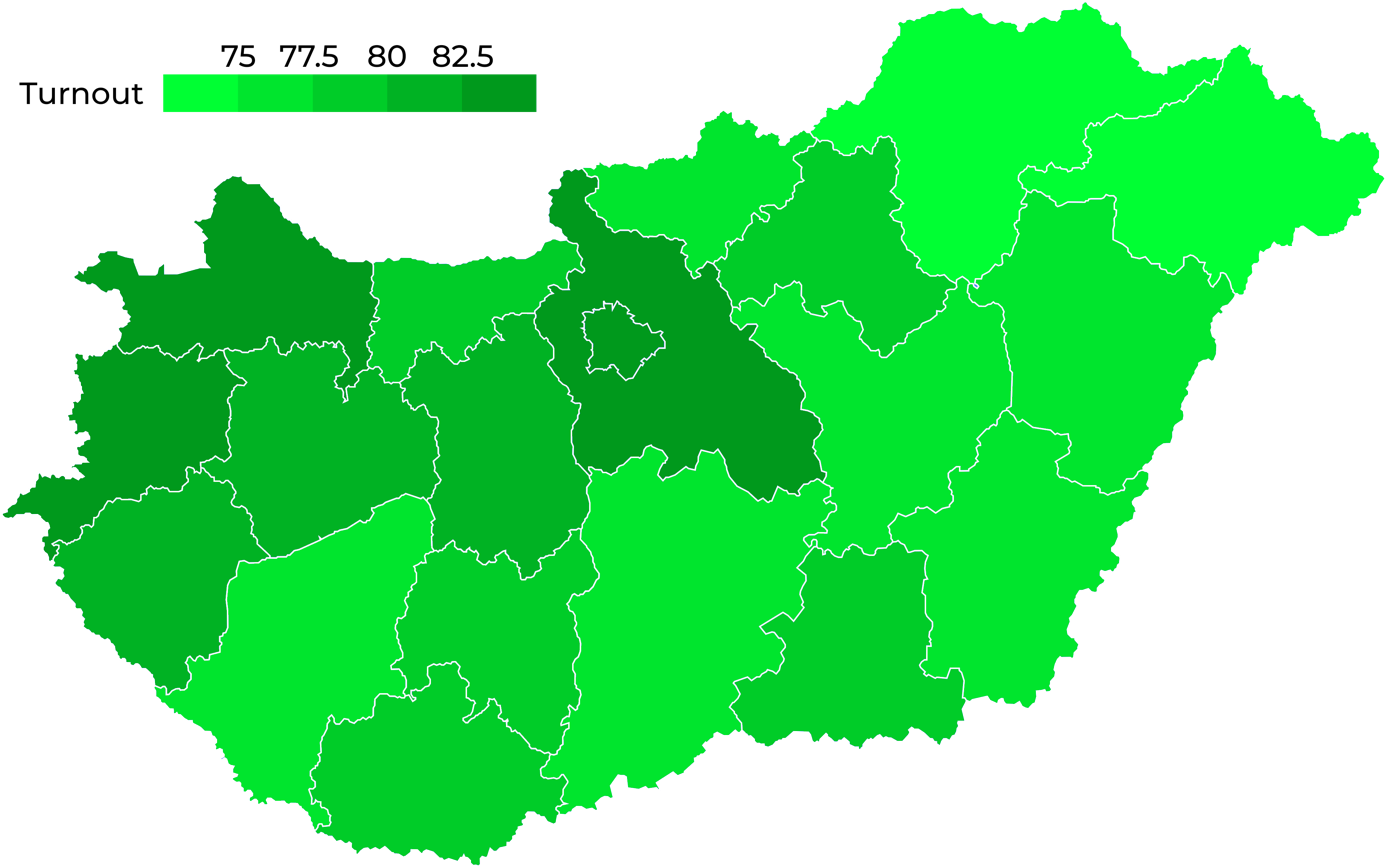
Turnout by county and capital city

Turnout (only within Hungary, excl. voters from abroad)
County	7:00	9:00	11:00	13:00	15:00	17:00	18:30	Overall
Bács-Kiskun	3.66%	18.53%	39.17%	53.09%	64.15%	72.29%	75.71%	77.19%
Baranya	3.43%	16.72%	37.33%	51.93%	63.67%	72.15%	75.67%	77.52%
Békés	3.70%	18.61%	40.69%	54.66%	65.17%	72.07%	75.07%	76.64%
Borsod–Abaúj–Zemplén	2.75%	14.13%	33.69%	44.81%	60.08%	68.13%	71.92%	73.74%
Budapest	3.45%	15.96%	36.98%	56.77%	69.23%	77.18%	80.96%	83.10%
Csongrád-Csanád	3.40%	17.67%	39.50%	55.23%	66.31%	74.19%	77.73%	79.55%
Fejér	3.45%	17.97%	39.95%	55.98%	67.59%	75.82%	79.32%	81.11%
Győr–Moson–Sopron	3.50%	17.29%	39.48%	55.21%	68.38%	78.19%	81.95%	83.45%
Hajdú–Bihar	3.87%	17.73%	37.49%	52.26%	63.33%	71.22%	74.81%	76.61%
Heves	3.39%	17.11%	38.10%	54.02%	65.15%	73.08%	76.66%	78.37%
Jász–Nagykun–Szolnok	3.66%	18.35%	39.22%	53.09%	63.30%	70.77%	73.99%	75.76%
Komárom-Esztergom	3.44%	17.14%	38.81%	54.48%	66.09%	74.36%	77.91%	79.54%
Nógrád	2.97%	15.09%	35.54%	50.49%	62.21%	70.34%	74.16%	76.10%
Pest	3.97%	18.01%	40.10%	58.01%	69.67%	77.58%	80.96%	82.55%
Somogy	3.36%	16.86%	37.73%	52.00%	64.17%	72.48%	75.87%	77.37%
Szabolcs-Szatmár-Bereg	2.84%	14.52%	33.10%	47.62%	60.33%	68.91%	72.62%	74.36%
Tolna	3.64%	18.61%	39.50%	52.54%	63.80%	72.28%	75.86%	77.61%
Vas	3.10%	15.92%	36.97%	52.83%	67.17%	77.66%	81.56%	83.49%
Veszprém	3.42%	17.34%	39.45%	54.96%	67.63%	76.43%	79.86%	81.32%
Zala	2.98%	15.77%	37.41%	52.84%	66.43%	75.59%	79.22%	80.77%
Hungary	3.46%	16.89%	37.98%	54.14%	66.01%	74.23%	77.80%	79.56%

== Historical composition of the National Assembly since 1990 ==
MSZP / Párbeszéd / DK / Együtt / LMP / MLP / SZDSZ / Momentum / TISZA / Fidesz / KDNP / MDF / FKGP / MIÉP / Jobbik / MH / Germans / Others / Independent
Total seat count: 386
1990–1994 (Note: Between 1990 and 2014 the number of seats were 386.)	33 / 94 / 22 / 21 / 164 / 44 / 2 / 6
1994–1998	209 / 70 / 20 / 22 / 38 / 26 / 1
1998–2002	134 / 24 / 148 / 17 / 48 / 14 / 1
2002–2006	178 / 20 / 164 / 24
2006–2010	190 / 20 / 141 / 23 / 11 / 1
2010–2014	59 / 16 / 227 / 36 / 47 / 1
Total seat count: 199
2014–2018 (Note: Since 2014 the number of seats are 199.)	29 / 1 / 4 / 3 / 5 / 1 / 117 / 16 / 23
2018–2022	15 / 5 / 9 / 1 / 8 / 117 / 16 / 26 / 1 / 1
2022–2026	10 / 6 / 15 / 5 / 10 / 117 / 18 / 10 / 6 / 1 / 1
2026–2030	141 / 44 / 8 / 6

The numbers come from the legislature's inaugural session. Later changes may occur:

- Vacancies from party list MPs do not change the make-up of the Assembly, as they are replaced by another member of the party list. But a vacancy in a district seat triggers a by-election, which, historically, is often won by another party. See List of Hungarian by-elections.
- New factions may appear
  - in 1993, the nationalist-radicalist members of MDF quit the party and founded the MIÉP, which took part in the next three elections. It crossed the threshold only in 1998.
  - in 2011, the DK faction led by former socialist prime minister Ferenc Gyurcsány, split from the MSZP and became a party of its own.
  - in 2013, 8 MPs from LMP left the party to set up Dialogue for Hungary

=== Prime ministers and their governments since 1989 ===
Parties MSZP Fidesz MDF Tisza Independent

No.	Portrait	Name (Birth–Death)	Term of office			Political party	Cabinet	Assembly (Election)
No.	Portrait	Name (Birth–Death)	Took office	Left office	Time in office	Political party	Cabinet	Assembly (Election)
—		Miklós Németh (born 1948) provisional	23 October 1989	23 May 1990	212 days	MSZP	Németh; MSZP	—
53		József Antall (1932–1993)	23 May 1990	12 December 1993	3 years, 203 days	MDF	Antall; MDF–FKGP (Note: FKGP split into two groups on 24 February 1992. EKGP (Group of 33 then 36 MPs) continued to support the government, while FKGP (Group of 12 then 10 MPs) went into opposition.)–KDNP	34 (1990)
—		Péter Boross (born 1928) acting	12 December 1993	21 December 1993	9 days	MDF	Antall; MDF–FKGP–KDNP	34 (1990)
54		Péter Boross (born 1928)	21 December 1993	15 July 1994	206 days	MDF	Boross; MDF–EKGP–KDNP	34 (1990)
55		Gyula Horn (1932–2013)	15 July 1994	6 July 1998	3 years, 356 days	MSZP	Horn; MSZP–SZDSZ	35 (1994)
56		Viktor Orbán (born 1963); 1st term	6 July 1998	27 May 2002	3 years, 325 days	Fidesz	Orbán I Fidesz–FKGP–MDF	36 (1998)
57		Péter Medgyessy (born 1942)	27 May 2002	29 September 2004	2 years, 125 days	Independent	Medgyessy; MSZP–SZDSZ	37 (2002)
58		Ferenc Gyurcsány (born 1961)	29 September 2004	9 June 2006	4 years, 197 days	MSZP	Gyurcsány I MSZP–SZDSZ	37 (2002)
58		Ferenc Gyurcsány (born 1961)	9 June 2006	14 April 2009	4 years, 197 days	MSZP	Gyurcsány II; MSZP–SZDSZ (Note: SZDSZ left the Gyurcsány II Cabinet on 20 April 2008.)	38 (2006)
59		Gordon Bajnai (born 1968)	14 April 2009	29 May 2010	1 year, 45 days	Independent	Bajnai; MSZP (Note: The Bajnai Cabinet was supported externally by SZDSZ.)	38 (2006)
(56)		Viktor Orbán (born 1963); 2nd term	29 May 2010	10 May 2014	15 years, 345 days	Fidesz	Orbán II; Fidesz–KDNP	39 (2010)
(56)		Viktor Orbán (born 1963); 2nd term	10 May 2014	10 May 2018	15 years, 345 days	Fidesz	Orbán III; Fidesz–KDNP	40 (2014)
(56)		Viktor Orbán (born 1963); 2nd term	10 May 2018	16 May 2022	15 years, 345 days	Fidesz	Orbán IV; Fidesz–KDNP	41 (2018)
(56)		Viktor Orbán (born 1963); 2nd term	16 May 2022	9 May 2026	15 years, 345 days	Fidesz	Orbán V Fidesz–KDNP	42 (2022)
60		Péter Magyar (born 1981)	9 May 2026	Incumbent	95 days	Tisza	Magyar; Tisza	43 (2026)

== Local elections ==
Elections for mayors and municipalities (Hungarian: Helyi önkormányzati választások) occur every five years (formerly every four years in the autumn following the general elections). On the local elections, the following are elected directly by the voters:

in Budapest

- Lord Mayor of Budapest (now since 2019: Gergely Karácsony, between 1990 and 2010: Gábor Demszky)
- members of the City Council of Budapest (since 2010: 33, 1994-2010: 66, 1990-1994: 88)
  - voters vote for party-lists
- Mayors of the districts of Budapest
- members of the District Council
  - districts of Budapest are divided to election zones (not to be confused with the constituencies of the country), and voters can vote for one of the candidates representing their election zone in the District Council

in the towns/cities with county rank:

- Mayor of the town/city
- members of the Town/City Council
  - voters vote for party-lists

in the counties (excluding towns/cities with county rank):

- members of the County Council
  - voters vote for party-lists
- Mayors of the cities, towns, villages
- members of the City/Town/Village Council
  - cities, towns and villages larger than 10000 inhabitants are divided to election zones (not to be confused with the constituencies of the country), and voters can vote for one of the candidates representing their election zone in the City/Town Council
  - towns and villages smaller than 10000 inhabitants are not divided to election zones, in these villages voters can choose as many candidates out of all the candidates as many seats there are in the Village Council, so for instance in a Village Council, where 7 seats are available and there are 15 candidates, the voters can vote for 1 to 7 candidates. Exception if the village is administratively part of a town or city, in this case the village has got one seat in the Town/City Council and villagers can only vote for one candidate representing their village in the Town/City Council just like in case of the election zones of the towns and cities. In this case the village is considered to be one of the election zones of the town/city.

The chairman of the County Council is elected by the members of the Council, unlike the Lord Mayor of Budapest or the Mayors of towns/cities with county rank, which are elected directly by people.

== European Parliament elections ==
Since the EU expansion to Croatia, Hungary delegates 21 members to the European Parliament based on the Nice treaty. Any EU citizens with residence in Hungary have the right to vote for a party-list. In case of the EU elections there are no constituency votes.

The latest EP election in Hungary took place on 9 June 2024, which was the fifth one at all, after the 2004 EP election, which took place on 13 June 2004, bit more than a month after the EU expansion to 10 Eastern European countries.

== Referendums ==
The Constitution of Hungary prescribes two ways to hold a referendum (Article 8):

- Parliament shall order a national referendum upon the motion of at least two hundred thousand electors
- Parliament may order a national referendum upon the motion of the President of the Republic, the Government or one hundred thousand electors.

The Constitution imposes a number of prohibitions on matters on which a referendum can be held, including amending Constitution, budget, taxing, obligations from international agreements, military operations, etc.

Required voter turnout for the referendum to be valid is 50%. The decision made by a referendum is binding on the Parliament.

=== Past referendums ===
There were 8 referendums in modern Hungary:

- Four-part referendum in 1989 (4 questions, all passed)
- Presidential election referendum in 1990 (1 question, failed because of low voter turnout)
- NATO membership referendum in 1997 (1 question, passed)
- European Union membership referendum in 2003 (1 question, passed)
- Dual citizenship referendum in 2004 (2 questions, both failed because of low voter turnout)
- Fees abolishment referendum in 2008 (3 question, all passed)
- 2016 Hungarian migrant quota referendum in 2016 (1 question, failed because of low voter turnout)
- 2022 Hungarian LGBT in education referendum in 2022 (4 questions, failed because of low voter turnout)

== Presidential elections (indirect) ==
The President of Hungary, who has a largely ceremonial role under the country's constitution, is elected by the members of the National Assembly to serve for a term of five years (maximum two times), and has to quit their political party (if they have one) in order to be impartial and able to express the unity of the nation (so the "Political Party" column refers to their party membership, prior to becoming president).

=== Presidents of Hungary since 1989 ===
Parties MSZP SZDSZ Fidesz Independent

No.	Portrait	Name (Birth–Death)	Term of office			Political party (Note: All presidents since 1990 have resigned their political affiliation after taking office. The parties listed represent those that presidents have been elected as representatives of.)	Position(s)	Term (Election)
No.	Portrait	Name (Birth–Death)	Took office	Left office	Time in office	Political party	Position(s)	Term (Election)
—		Mátyás Szűrös (born 1933)	23 October 1989	2 May 1990	191 days	MSZP	Provisional President of the Republic	—
—		Árpád Göncz (1922–2015)	2 May 1990	3 August 1990	10 years, 93 days	SZDSZ	Acting President of the Republic; Also Speaker of the National Assembly	—
1		Árpád Göncz (1922–2015)	3 August 1990	3 August 1995	10 years, 93 days	SZDSZ	President of the Republic	1 (1990)
1		Árpád Göncz (1922–2015)	3 August 1995	3 August 2000	10 years, 93 days	SZDSZ	President of the Republic	2 (1995)
2		Ferenc Mádl (1931–2011)	4 August 2000	4 August 2005	5 years	Independent	President of the Republic	3 (2000)
3		László Sólyom (1942–2023)	5 August 2005	5 August 2010	5 years	Independent	President of the Republic	4 (2005)
4		Pál Schmitt (born 1942)	6 August 2010	2 April 2012	1 year, 240 days	Fidesz	President of the Republic	5 (2010)
—		László Kövér (born 1959)	2 April 2012	10 May 2012	38 days	Fidesz	Acting President of the Republic; Also Speaker of the National Assembly	—
5		János Áder (born 1959)	10 May 2012	10 May 2017	10 years	Fidesz	President of the Republic	6 (2012)
5		János Áder (born 1959)	10 May 2017	10 May 2022	10 years	Fidesz	President of the Republic	7 (2017)
6		Katalin Novák (born 1977)	10 May 2022	26 February 2024	1 year, 292 days	Fidesz	President of the Republic	8 (2022)
—		László Kövér (born 1959)	26 February 2024	5 March 2024	8 days	Fidesz	Acting President of the Republic; Also Speaker of the National Assembly	—
7		Tamás Sulyok (born 1956)	5 March 2024	19 July 2026	2 years, 136 days	Independent	President of the Republic	9 (2024)
—		Ágnes Forsthoffer (born 1980)	20 July 2026	Incumbent	23 days	Tisza	Acting President of the Republic; Also Speaker of the National Assembly	—
8		András Baka (born 1952)	President-elect Assumbing office on 19 August 2026		−7 days	Independent	President of the Republic	10 (2026)

== Past elections ==
Until 2010, elections for the 386-seat National Assembly (Országgyűlés) involved two separate ballots, two rounds, and three classes of seats: 176 members were elected in single-member districts through a two-round system, and 146 were elected through proportional representation in 20 regional multi-member constituencies (MMCs), in a non-compensatory way (parallel allocation). Finally, 64 nationwide levelling seats were allocated in such a way to correct for discrepancies between votes and seats in the different constituencies (the number of multi-member district seats and levelling seats varied over time; the shares shown here were for the 2010 election). For both MMCs and levelling seats, the electoral threshold was 5% of the MMC vote. (Where two parties presented a joint list, their threshold was 10%; for three or more joined parties, the threshold was 15%.)

The second round would be held two weeks after the first, in situations where no candidate in the single-member district won and/or where the MMC result was invalidated due to low turnout.

=== First round ===
In the first round, each voter may cast

- one vote for one candidate running for the local single-seat constituency;
- one vote for a party list established in the local MMC.

After the polls close:

- The result in single-seat constituencies where voter turnout was below 50% is declared invalid, and all candidates for the first round enter the second round.
- Any single-seat constituency where turnout was over 50% and one candidate received over 50% of the votes is won by that candidate, and no second round takes place.
- In all remaining single-seat constituencies (i.e., where turnout exceeded 50% but no candidate received over 50% of votes), the top three candidates and any other candidates having received at least 15% of votes are eligible (a kind of runoff voting).
- The result for MMCs where the turnout was over 50% is produced. (If all MMCs saw adequate turnout, the parties passing the election threshold could already be determined and the MMC seats could be allocated.)

=== Second round ===
In the second round, each voter may cast

- one vote for one candidate still standing in the single-seat constituency, if the seat was not won in the first round;
- one vote for a party list in the MMC, if the first round was invalid due to insufficient turnout.

After the polls close:

- Any seats in single-seat constituencies where turnout was below 25%, or where the first two candidates received an equal number of votes, will remain vacant.
- All other single-seat constituencies will be won by the candidate who received the most votes.
- The result of MMC where turnout was below 25% is declared invalid, and the seats from that constituency are added to the compensation seats.
- The parties passing the threshold are identified based on MMCs with a valid result. Seats from these constituencies are distributed.
- Parties having passed the threshold are eligible for the compensation seats; these are distributed based on:
  - the sum of votes remaining in the MMCs after the distribution of the seats, plus
  - the sum of votes cast for losing candidates of each party in the first valid round of each single-seat constituency (similar to the scorporo system). Since the first valid round is taken into account, votes are still counted for a candidate who is eliminated in the first round, or who steps down after a valid first round to endorse another, more viable candidate.

== See also ==
- List of Hungarian by-elections
- Electoral calendar
- Electoral system
- International Criticism of Fourth Amendment of the 2011 Constitution
