= Anna Müller =

Anna Müller may refer to:

- Anna-Maria Müller (1949–2009), East German sportswoman
- Anna Müller, a Swiss-German equivalent to Jane Doe
- Anna Müller, a member of the Austrian electronic musical duo HVOB
- Anna Müller, President of Volvo Penta
- Anna Müller (politician), Hungarian member of parliament

With double names:

- Anna Müller-Lincke (1869-1935) German stage and film actress
