= Endre Márton László =

Hungarian politician

Member of the National Assembly
- Incumbent
- Assumed office 9 May 2026
- Preceded by: László Vécsey
- Constituency: Pest 6th

Personal details
- Party: Tisza

Endre Márton László is a Hungarian politician who was elected member of the National Assembly in 2026 representing the Pest County 6th constituency. He previously worked as an emergency medical technician.
