= Fejér County 1st constituency =

Constituency in Hungary (2012-)

Fejér County 1st constituency (Székesfehérvár)
- Constituency for the National Assembly
- Location of Fejér county 01 within Fejér county

- Location of Fejér county within Hungary
- County: Fejér
- Electorate: 60,023 (2022)
- Major settlements: Székesfehérvár

Current constituency
- Created: 2011 (modified 2024)
- Party: Tisza Party
- Member: Béla Csiszár
- Elected: 2026

The 1st constituency of Fejér County (Hungarian: Fejér megyei 01. számú országgyűlési egyéni választókerület) is one of the single member constituencies of the National Assembly, the national legislature of Hungary. The constituency standard abbreviation: Fejér 01. OEVK.

Since 2026, it has been represented by Béla Csiszár of the Tisza Party.

== Geography ==
The 1st constituency is located in central part of Fejér County.

=== List of municipalities ===
The constituency includes the following municipalities:

1. Füle
2. Jenő
3. Kőszárhegy
4. Nádasdladány
5. Polgárdi
6. Sárkeszi
7. Sárszentmihály
8. Szabadbattyán
9. Székesfehérvár: Southern part of the city.
10. Tác
11. Úrhida

== Members ==
The constituency was first represented by Tamás Vargha of the Fidesz from 2014, and he was re-elected in 2018 and 2022. In the 2026 election, Béla Csiszár of the Tisza Party was elected representative.

Election	Member	Party	%	Ref.
2014	Tamás Vargha	Fidesz	44.22	
2018	Tamás Vargha	Fidesz	47.17	
2022	Tamás Vargha	Fidesz	47.43	
2026	Béla Csiszár	Tisza Party	55.75	
