= Pest County 6th constituency =

Constituency in Hungary (2012-)

- Constituency for the National Assembly
- Location of Pest county 06 within Pest county

- Location of Pest county within Hungary
- County: Pest
- Electorate: 76,717 (2026)
- Major settlements: Gödöllő

Current constituency
- Created: 2024
- Party: Tisza Party
- Member: Endre Márton László

The Pest County 6th parliamentary constituency is one of the 106 constituencies into which the territory of Hungary is divided by Act LXXIX of 2024, and in which voters can elect one member of the National Assembly. The standard abbreviation of the constituency name is: Pest 06. OEVK. The seat is Gödöllő.

== Area ==
The constituency includes the following settlements:

1. Gödöllő
2. Kerepes
3. Kistarcsa
4. Mogyoród
5. Nagytarcsa
6. Szada
7. Veresegyház

== Members ==
Since 2014, the constituency has been represented by László Vécsey from the party Fidesz.

Election	Member	Party	%
2014	László Vécsey	Fidesz–KDNP	42.92
2018	László Vécsey	Fidesz–KDNP	45.92
2022	László Vécsey	Fidesz–KDNP	49.58
2026	Endre Márton László	TISZA	60.55
