= Enikő Tompa =

Hungarian politician

Member of the National Assembly
- Assuming office 9 May 2026
- Succeeding: László Pósán
- Constituency: Hajdú-Bihar 2nd

Personal details
- Party: Tisza

Enikő Tompa is a Hungarian politician who was elected member of the National Assembly in 2026 representing the Hajdú-Bihar County 2nd constituency. She previously worked as an administrative manager.
