= Béla Csiszár =

Hungarian politician

Member of the National Assembly
- Assuming office 9 May 2026
- Succeeding: Tamás Vargha
- Constituency: Fejér 1st

Personal details
- Party: Tisza

Béla Csiszár is a Hungarian politician who was elected member of the National Assembly in 2026 representing the Fejér County 1st constituency. He previously worked as an engineer.
