= 1990 Hungarian presidential election =

- 3 August 1990

Needed to win: Two-thirds of all members of the National Assembly (first ballot) 386 MPs, 257 votes needed to win
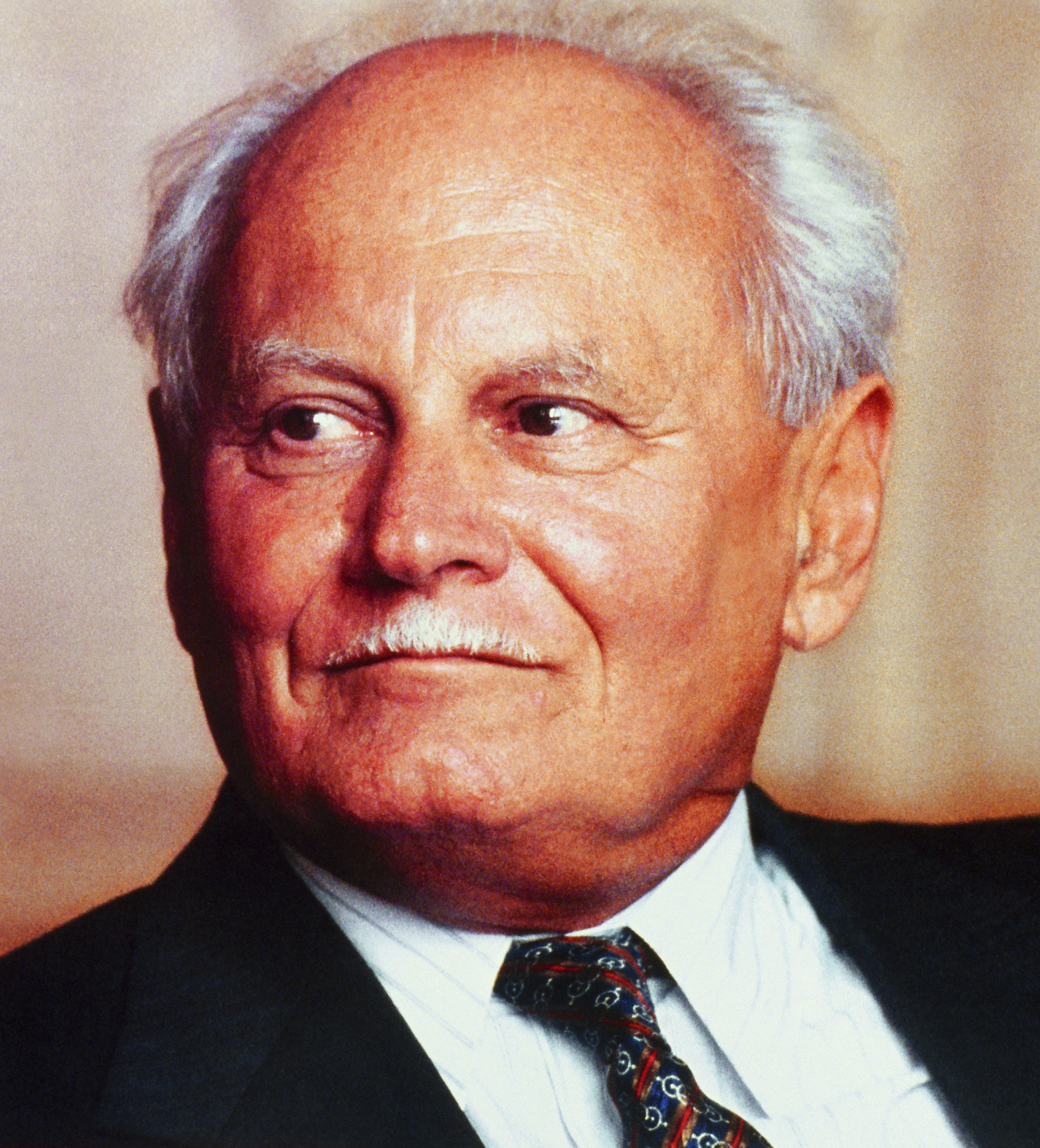

Nominee	Árpád Göncz	Against
Party	SZDSZ
Electoral vote	295	13
Percentage	95.78%	4.22%
Elected President
Árpád Göncz
SZDSZ

The first indirect presidential election was held in Hungary on 3 August 1990, following the transition to multi-party democracy. Incumbent Speaker of the National Assembly and acting head of state Árpád Göncz was elected as president with more than three-quarter majority.

== Background ==
During the era of transition from communist one-party system into multi-party democracy, reburial of Imre Nagy proved to be a catalyst event; the hard-line Károly Grósz was outranked by a four-member collective presidency of the reformist wing within the Hungarian Socialist Workers' Party on 26 June 1989. The ruling communist party began discussions with the opposition groups within the framework of the so-called Round Table Talks. The question of the post-communist presidential position was one of the most problematic disputes between the parties. The Hungarian Socialist Workers' Party suggested a directly elected semi-presidential system, however this proposal was strongly refused by the sharply anti-communist Alliance of Free Democrats and Fidesz, because the reformer communist Imre Pozsgay was the most popular Hungarian politician in those months. The Hungarian Socialist Workers' Party leaders presumed Pozsgay, a leader of the Communists' radical reformer faction, would win. The smaller opposition parties wanted a parliamentary system, proportional representation, and a weak presidency. However, they too believed that Pozsgay would be elected president. In August 1989, József Antall, leader of the Hungarian Democratic Forum presented a new proposal (ceremonial presidential system with indirect elections by the parliament, but the first election by the people). Excluding Alliance of Free Democrats, Fidesz and Democratic Confederation of Free Trade Unions, the remaining five opposition groups and the Hungarian Socialist Workers' Party accepted and signed the proposal. However, following collecting signatures by Fidesz and Alliance of Free Democrats, a four-part referendum was held on 26 November 1989, where the voters chose "yes" for the question of "Should the president be elected after parliamentary elections?"

In the end, the implicit deal on the presidency (the only place where the Communists appeared to have gotten the upper hand) reached in the Round Table Talks was reversed: when the Hungarian Socialist Workers' Party dissolved itself in early October and became the Hungarian Socialist Party, a majority of members as well as MPs failed to join the new party, and Pozsgay was not elected its leader. The Hungarian Democratic Forum won the first democratically free parliamentary election in March 1990, while Alliance of Free Democrats came to the second place with 92 MPs. József Antall became Prime Minister and entered coalition with Independent Smallholders, Agrarian Workers and Civic Party and the Christian Democratic People's Party. As there were several two-thirds laws according to the Hungarian Constitution, Antall concluded pact with Alliance of Free Democrats, under which the liberal opposition party could nominee a candidate for the position of President of Hungary, in exchange for contribution to the constitutional amendments. According to some opinions, the pact concluded specifically for the person of Árpád Göncz.

The Hungarian Socialist Party themselves used the initiative to force a vote on direct election of the president on 29 July 1990, but this failed due to a turnout of just 14%. Instead of a Communist candidate chosen in direct elections before the election of a new parliament, the parliamentary parties unanimously nominated Alliance of Free Democrats politician and notable anti-communist Árpád Göncz to the position of President of Hungary.

== Results ==
Candidate	Party	Votes	%
Árpád Göncz	Alliance of Free Democrats	295	95.78
Against		13	4.22
Total		308	100.00
Valid votes		308	99.35
Invalid/blank votes		2	0.65
Total votes		310	100.00
Registered voters/turnout		386	80.31

== Aftermath ==
Parliamentary speaker and, consequently, acting head of state Árpád Göncz was elected for a full term as president by the National Assembly by 295 votes to 13. After taking the oath before the new legislative speaker György Szabad, Göncz stated in his inaugural speech that:

I am not, I can not be a servant of parties, party interests. In my whole life, within and outside party, I served and I will serve for national independence, freedom of thought, freedom of faith in the idea of free homeland, and social justice with human rights without discrimination and exclusion."

He also added,

"I would like to serve the unprotected, the defenceless people, those, who lacked the means to protect themselves both in the «feudal crane feather world» [referring to Miklós Horthy's Hungary] and in the «world of more equals among equals» [i.e. the communist regime between 1945 and 1989]."

== Sources ==
- Butler, David; Ranney, Austin (1994), Referendums Around the World: The Growing Use of Direct Democracy, American Enterprise Institute, ISBN 0-8447-3853-0.
- De Nevers, Renée (2003), Comrades No More: The Seeds of Change in Eastern Europe, MIT Press, ISBN 0-262-54129-7.
- Elster, Jon; Offe, Claus; Preuss, Ulrich K (1998), Institutional Design in Post-communist Societies, Cambridge University Press, ISBN 0-521-47931-2.
- Grzymała-Busse, Anna Maria (2002), Redeeming the Communist Past: The Regeneration of Communist Parties in East Central Europe, Cambridge University Press, ISBN 0-521-00146-3.
- Kim, Dae Soon (2012). Göncz Árpád – Politikai életrajz (in Hungarian). Scolar Kiadó. ISBN 978-963-244-348-5.
