= Roland Juhász (politician) =

Hungarian politician

Member of the National Assembly
- Incumbent
- Assumed office 9 May 2026
- Preceded by: Katalin Csöbör
- Constituency: Borsod-Abaúj-Zemplén 1st

Personal details
- Party: Tisza

Roland Juhász is a Hungarian politician who was elected member of the National Assembly in 2026 representing the Borsod-Abaúj-Zemplén County 1st constituency. He previously worked in the hospitality industry.
