= Alexandra Szabó =

Hungarian politician

Member of the National Assembly
- Assuming office 9 May 2026
- Succeeding: Mónika Dunai
- Constituency: Budapest 14th

Personal details
- Party: Tisza

Alexandra Szabó is a Hungarian politician who was elected member of the National Assembly in 2026 representing the Budapest 14th constituency. She previously worked as a physician.
