= Andrea Perticsné Kácsor =

Hungarian politician

Member of the National Assembly
- Incumbent
- Assumed office 9 May 2026
- Preceded by: Tibor Pogácsás
- Constituency: Pest 10th

Personal details
- Party: TISZA

Andrea Perticsné Kácsor is a Hungarian politician who was elected member of the National Assembly in 2026. She previously worked as an adjunct professor at the Budapest University of Technology and Economics.
