= Komárom-Esztergom County 1st constituency =

Hungarian national legislative constituency

Komárom-Esztergom County 1st constituency (Tatabánya)
- Constituency for the National Assembly
- Location of Komárom-Esztergom county 01 within Komárom-Esztergom county

- Location of Komárom-Esztergom county within Hungary
- County: Komárom-Esztergom
- Electorate: 81,089 (2018)
- Major settlements: Tatabánya

Current constituency
- Created: 2011
- Party: Tisza Party
- Member: Ildikó Éva Sopov
- Elected: 2026

The 1st constituency of Komárom-Esztergom County (Hungarian: Komárom-Esztergom megyei 01. számú országgyűlési egyéni választókerület) is one of the single member constituencies of the National Assembly, the national legislature of Hungary. The constituency standard abbreviation: Komárom-Esztergom 01. OEVK.

== Geography ==
The 1st constituency is located in central-southern part of Komárom-Esztergom County.

=== List of municipalities ===
The constituency includes the following municipalities:

1. Baj
2. Szárliget
3. Tata
4. Tatabánya
5. Vértesszőlős

== Members ==
The constituency was first represented by János Bencsik of the Fidesz from 2014, and he was re-elected in 2018 and 2022. In 2026 Ildikó Éva Sopov was elected as representative.

Election	Member	Party	%	Ref.
2014	János Bencsik	Fidesz	42.89	
2018	János Bencsik	Fidesz	44.43	
2022	János Bencsik	Fidesz	48.18	
2026	Ildikó Éva Sopov	Tisza Party	59.80	

== Parliamentary elections ==
Results of the 2026 parliamentary election
Party	Candidate	Votes	%	± (pp)
Tisza Party	Ildikó Éva Sopov	36,785	59.80	New
Fidesz–KDNP	János Bencsik	20,778	33.78	▼14.40
Our Homeland Movement	Bánk Boda	2,581	4.20	▼1.04
Democratic Coalition	Ágnes Vadai	857	1.39	▼39.77
MKKP	Ladányi Luca	510	0.83	▼1.79
Turnout		61,815	79.86	▲9.84
Electorate		77,401	100	▼1.56 (%)
The Tisza Party wins the constituency.

Results of the 2022 parliamentary election
Party	Candidate	Votes	%	± %
Fidesz–KDNP	János Bencsik	26,240	48.18	▲3.75
United for Hungary	Dr. Erik Konczer	22,417	41.16	▼10.98
Our Homeland Movement	Bánk Boda	2856	5.24	New
MKKP	Dávid Börzsei	1429	2.62	▲0.88
Solution Movement	Dr. Judit Popovics	891	1.64	New
Normal Party	Tibor Keindl	372	0.68	New
Hungarian Workers' Party	Tibor Jánoki	252	0.46	▲0.18
Turnout		55,037	70.02	▼0.23
Electorate		78,608	100	▼3.15
The Fidesz–KDNP alliance retained the constituency.

Results of the 2018 parliamentary election
Party	Candidate	Votes	%	± %
Fidesz–KDNP	János Bencsik	25,128	44.43	▲1.54
MSZP–Dialogue	Miklós Fekete	15,192	26.86	▼5.06
Jobbik	Bánk Boda	11,071	19.58	▲3.84
LMP	Menyhért Körtvélyfáy	2440	4.31	▼0.64
MKKP	Alexandra Barna	985	1.74	New
Momentum	László Novák	785	1.39	New
Hungarian Workers' Party	István Szücs	159	0.28	New
Turnout		56,967	70.25	▲9.23
Electorate		81,089	100	▼1.87
The Fidesz–KDNP alliance retained the constituency.

Results of the 2014 parliamentary election
Party	Candidate	Votes	%
Fidesz–KDNP	János Bencsik	21,434	42.89
Unity	Zoltán Lukács	15,954	31.92
Jobbik	Sebestyén Vágó	7868	15.74
LMP	Zsolt Gutai	2473	4.95
Hungarian Workers' Party	Tímea Petrik	362	0.72
Other parties		1885	3.77
Turnout		50,419	61.02
Electorate		82,629	100
The Fidesz–KDNP alliance won the constituency.
