= Hajdú-Bihar County 2nd constituency =

Constituency in Hungary (2012-)

Hajdú-Bihar County 2nd constituency (Debrecen)
- Constituency for the National Assembly
- Location of Hajdú-Bihar county 02 within Hajdú-Bihar county

- Location of Hajdú-Bihar county within Hungary
- County: Hajdú-Bihar
- Electorate: 76,073 (2018)
- Major settlements: Debrecen

Current constituency
- Created: 2011
- Party: Tisza Party
- Member: Enikő Tompa
- Elected: 2026

The 2nd constituency of Hajdú-Bihar County (Hungarian: Hajdú-Bihar megyei 02. számú országgyűlési egyéni választókerület) is one of the single member constituencies of the National Assembly, the national legislature of Hungary. The constituency standard abbreviation: Hajdú-Bihar 02. OEVK.

Since 2026, it has been represented by Enikő Tompa of the Tisza Party.

== Geography ==
The 2nd constituency is located in central-eastern part of Hajdú-Bihar County.

=== List of municipalities ===
The constituency includes the following municipalities:

1. Debrecen: Southern part of the city.

== Members ==
The constituency was first represented by László Pósán of the Fidesz from 2014, and he was re-elected in 2018 and 2022. In the 2026 election, Enikő Tompa of the Tisza Party was elected representative.

Election	Member	Party	%	Ref.
2014	László Pósán	Fidesz	45.42	
2018	László Pósán	Fidesz	49.40	
2022	László Pósán	Fidesz	55.61	
2026	Enikő Tompa	TISZA	58.18	
