= József Sárosi =

Hungarian politician

Member of the National Assembly
- Incumbent
- Assumed office 9 May 2026
- Preceded by: István Horváth
- Constituency: Tolna 1st

Personal details
- Party: Tisza

József Sárosi is a Hungarian politician who was elected member of the National Assembly in 2026 representing the Tolna County 1st constituency. He previously worked as a CEO.
