= Zsuzsa Máthé =

Hungarian artist (born 1964)

Zsuzsa Máthé (born May 4, 1964) is a Hungarian artist. Her first exhibit opened in 1983, when she was age 18, entitled The First Exhibit of Transrealism.

By the age of 21 she extensively visited most countries in Europe, from communist Russia to the UK where she obtained qualifications to be able to start up one of the first privately owned English language schools of Budapest.

== Art ==
Zsuzsa Máthé is one of the modern painters of the New Wave internationally. Her arts had been exhibited in Budapest, Hungary and various galleries around Israel.

Her works are often considered as a pre-runner to the Goth subculture so popular today. New Romantic (1984), The Entry of Sedahv (1986), Sailor and Madonna (1986), Wo bist du? (1987) are some of the most characteristic works of this genre.

== Exhibitions ==
- The First Exhibition of Transrealism — April 1984, Cultural Center Kada, Budapest, Hungary
- The Gates of Within and Beyond — November, 1984, Eötvös Lóránd University, Budapest, Hungary
- Withdrawn Promises — February 1985 Eötvös Lóránd University, Budapest, Hungary
- Exchange Group (Exchange-series Philosophical ArtForwardAcademy) March 1–8. 1985. - Young Artists Club, Budapest,
- La Malade Imaginaire — April 1987 Eötvös Lóránd University, Budapest, Hungary
- Georges Cziffra pianist master course, joint exhibit, Keszthely, June, 1987 - Castle Festetics
- Shipwreck — November, 1987, Cultural Center Mayakovskij, Budapest, Hungary,
- World Art Expo 2009, June, 2009 Orange County, CA, USA (honorable mention)
- Retrospect Gallery DunaPart, WestEnd City Center, Budapest, June, 2009
- Joint exhibit at the Grand Salon des Arts Gallery, Laguna Bearch, USA, August - October, 2009
- Joint exhibit on the XX. Biennial of Humour and Satire, Museum of Humour and Satire, Gabrovo, Bulgaria, May - September, 2011. representing Hungary

== Media ==
- Duna TV interview June 12, 2009 on YouTube
