= Budapest 13th constituency =

Hungarian legislative district

Coordinates: 47°30′57″N 19°12′27″E

Budapest 13th constituency (District XVI.)
- Constituency for the National Assembly
- Location of Budapest 13 within Budapest

- Location of Budapest within Hungary
- City: Budapest
- Electorate: 69,822 (2018)
- Major settlements: 16th District

Current constituency
- Created: 2011
- Party: Tisza Party
- Member: Anna Müller
- Elected: 2026

The 13th constituency of Budapest (Hungarian: Budapesti 13. számú országgyűlési egyéni választókerület) is one of the single-member constituencies of the National Assembly, the national legislature of Hungary. The constituency standard abbreviation: Budapest 13. OEVK.

Since 2026, it has been represented by Anna Müller of the Tisza Party.

== Geography ==
The 13th constituency is located in north-eastern part of Pest.

=== List of districts ===
The constituency includes the following municipalities:

1. District XVI.: Full part of the district.
2. District XIV.: Eastern part (Rákosfalva, Alsórákos) of the district.

== Members ==
The constituency was first represented by Kristóf Szatmáry of the Fidesz from 2014, and he was re-elected in 2018. In the 2026 election, Anna Müller of the Tisza Party was elected representative.

Election	Member	Party	%
2014	Kristóf Szatmáry	Fidesz	
2018	Kristóf Szatmáry	Fidesz	
2022	Zoltán Vajda	MSZP	45.5
2026	Anna Müller	TISZA	61.3
