= Attila Tilki =

Hungarian jurist and politician

Tilki Attila

Member of the National Assembly
- Incumbent
- Assumed office 16 May 2006

Personal details
- Born: 9 May 1967 (age 58) Kisvárda, Hungary
- Party: Fidesz
- Spouse: Anikó Tarpai
- Children: Abigél; Polett
- Profession: jurist, politician

Dr. Attila Tilki (born 9 May 1967) is a Hungarian jurist and politician, member of the National Assembly (MP) for Fehérgyarmat (Szabolcs-Szatmár-Bereg County Constituency X) from 2006 to 2014, and for Vásárosnamény (Szabolcs-Szatmár-Bereg County 4th constituency) since 2014. He served as mayor of Fehérgyarmat between 2006 and 2014.

== Biography ==
He graduated as a historian and Russian language teacher from the Bessenyei György Teacher Training College of Nyíregyháza in 1991. He accomplished his legal studies and graduated as a lawyer from the University of Debrecen in 2003. He also completed a university degree of regional development. He taught English language and history in Fehérgyarmat and Russian language in Csaholc.

From 2000 to 2002 he worked for the Prime Minister's Office, he was responsible for the regional development of small areas. From 2002 he was a member of the local assembly and deputy mayor of Fehérgyarmat. From 2002 he was vice president of the county branch of Fidesz. He is president of the Voluntary Fire Brigade in Fehérgyarmat, member of the Christian Intellectual Alliance and the Rákóczi Alliance.

In the parliamentary election held in 2006, he was elected MP for Fehérgyarmat. He was appointed a member of the Local Government and Urban Development Committee on 30 May 2006. He became mayor of Fehérgyarmat in the 2006 local elections. He secured a seat during the 2010 parliamentary election. He was appointed a member of the Committee on Foreign Affairs on 14 May 2010. He is a vice-chairman of the Committee on Budgets since 2014. In the 2014 Hungarian parliamentary election, he was elected in Szabolcs-Szatmár-Bereg County 4th constituency.

== Controversy ==
Attila Tilki was involved in a car accident in February 2012, while driving under the influence of alcohol, something he himself announced in a press release sent to MTI. According to the statement, Tilki brushed up against the guardrail on the M30 motorway. No one was injured in the incident, and Tilki waived his parliamentary immunity and was found by police to have alcohol in his system.
