= István Vitányi =

Hungarian jurist and politician (born 1952)

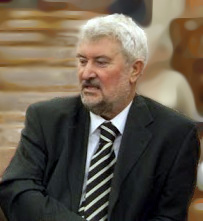
- Vitányi in 2011

Member of the National Assembly
- Incumbent
- Assumed office 18 June 1998

Personal details
- Born: 18 December 1952 (age 73) Berettyóújfalu, Hungary
- Party: Fidesz (since 1999)
- Profession: Jurist; politician

István Vitányi (born 18 December 1952) is a Hungarian jurist and politician, member of the National Assembly (MP) for Berettyóújfalu (Hajdú-Bihar County Constituency V then IV) from 2002 to 2006 and since 2010. He was also MP from the Hajdú-Bihar County Regional List of Fidesz from 1998 to 2002, and from 2006 to 2010. He's the oldest serving member of the National Assembly as of 2026.

== Biography ==
István Vitányi finished Arany János Secondary School in Berettyóújfalu in 1971. He was admitted to the Faculty of Law and Political Sciences of József Attila University in Szeged in 1974, where he graduated in 1980. He worked as head of the legal division of the ÁFÉSZ Purchase and Sales Co-operative in Berettyóújfalu until 1984. He passed his bar examination in 1983, and worked in the attorneys' office in Berettyóújfalu from 1984 until he opened his own legal practice in 1991. He has been acting as legal councilor to the Bihar Diocese of the Reformed Church since 1986. He was a member of the presidium of the hospital's Sporting Club from 1994 to 1998. He has been a member of the Hajdú-Bihar County Bar Association since 1984, and was on the presidium from 1997 to 2002.

He was elected a representative of Berettyóújfalu from the joint party list of Fidesz and the Alliance of Free Democrats (SZDSZ) in the 1994 local elections. He secured a seat in Parliament in the 1998 parliamentary election as a non-party candidate supported by Fidesz from the party's Hajdú-Bihar County Regional List. He joined Fidesz in 1999. He was elected a member of the National Board of Fidesz in 2003. He secured a mandate in the 2002 parliamentary election running as an individual candidate representing Berettyóújfalu (Constituency V, Hajdú-Bihar County). Following the establishment of the new Parliament, he started to work on the Committee on Constitution and Judicial Affairs and the Committee on Standing Orders. He was elected a representative in the Assembly of Berettyóújfalu in the 2002 local elections held on 20 October, becoming a member of the Committee for the Development of Berettyóújfalu and the Proprietary Committee. In the general election held in 2006, he was elected from the Hajdú-Bihar County Regional List. He was elected member of the Constitutional, Judicial and Standing Orders Committee on 30 May 2006. He became MP for Berettyóújfalu for the second time in the 2010 parliamentary election.
