= Borsod-Abaúj-Zemplén County 1st constituency =

Hungarian national legislative constituency

Borsod-Abaúj-Zemplén County 1st constituency (Miskolc)
- Constituency for the National Assembly
- Location of Borsod-Abaúj-Zemplén county 01 within Borsod-Abaúj-Zemplén county

- Location of Borsod-Abaúj-Zemplén county within Hungary
- County: Borsod-Abaúj-Zemplén
- Electorate: 72,579 (2022)
- Major settlements: Miskolc

Current constituency
- Created: 2011
- Party: Fidesz–KDNP
- Member: Katalin Csöbör
- Elected: 2014, 2018, 2022

The 1st constituency of Borsod-Abaúj-Zemplén County (Hungarian: Borsod-Abaúj-Zemplén megyei 01. számú országgyűlési egyéni választókerület) is one of the single member constituencies of the National Assembly, the national legislature of Hungary. The constituency standard abbreviation: Borsod-Abaúj-Zemplén 01. OEVK.

Since 2014, it has been represented by Katalin Csöbör of the Fidesz–KDNP party alliance.

== Geography ==
The 1st constituency is located in central part of Borsod-Abaúj-Zemplén County.

=== List of municipalities ===
The constituency includes the following municipalities:

1. Alsózsolca
2. Arnót
3. Felsőzsolca
4. Miskolc: Eastern part of the city.
5. Sajókeresztúr
6. Szirmabesenyő

== Members ==
The constituency was first represented by Katalin Csöbör of the Fidesz from 2014, and he was re-elected in 2018 and 2022.

Election	Member	Party	%	Ref.
2014	Katalin Csöbör	Fidesz	33.68	
2018	Katalin Csöbör	Fidesz	38.96	
2022	Katalin Csöbör	Fidesz	46.50	
