= Dávid Gombár =

Hungarian politician

Member of the National Assembly
- Assuming office 9 May 2026
- Succeeding: Béla Dankó
- Constituency: Békés 2nd

Personal details
- Party: TISZA

Dávid Gombár is a Hungarian politician who was elected member of the National Assembly in 2026. He is the self-employed owner of a technology company.
