= Ildikó Éva Sopov =

Hungarian politician

Member of the National Assembly
- Incumbent
- Assumed office 9 May 2026
- Preceded by: János Bencsik
- Constituency: Komárom-Esztergom County 1st

Personal details
- Party: Tisza Party

Ildikó Éva Sopov is a Hungarian politician who was elected member of the National Assembly in 2026.

== Early life and education ==
She grew up in Tata, in a family of Greek and German descent.

She graduated from the Eötvös Loránd University with a laws degree in 2000. In 2004, she completed a postgraduate specialization in European Law also at ELTE. The same year, she pursued further studies at the University of Oslo, where she focused on the intersection of law, technology and European legal developments.

Before entering politics, Sopov worked as a legal advisor, building experience in European legal affairs.

== Political career ==
She became involved with the TISZA Party during its formative years and was included among the party's candidates in the 2024 European Parliament election campaign.

At the 2026 Hungarian parliamentary election, she was elected Member of the National Assembly for Komárom-Esztergom County 1st constituency. She won the constituency with 59.8% of the vote, defeating the incumbent representative and securing one of the TISZA Party's individual constituency victories.

She took office on 9 May 2026, when the newly elected National Assembly was constituted.

== In Parliament ==
As a Member of Parliament, Sopov serves as Chair of the Committee on European Affairs, one of the National Assembly's standing committees responsible for scrutinising European Union legislation, monitoring EU affairs, and examining issues related to Hungary's membership .

She is also a member of the National Security Committee which exercises parliamentary oversight of national security services and policies.

In June 2026, she was elected to the Parliamentary Committee of Inquiry into the Operations of the Hungarian National Bank (MNB), established to investigate the governance and asset management practices of the central bank.

Her parliamentary work focuses on European integration, democratic institutions, national security, and strengthening Hungary's role within the European Union.

== Personal life ==
She is married and has two children.
