= Budapest 14th constituency =

Hungarian legislative district

Budapest 14th constituency (District XVII.)
- Constituency for the National Assembly
- Location of Budapest 14 within Budapest

- Location of Budapest within Hungary
- City: Budapest
- Electorate: 76,204 (2018)
- Major settlements: 17th District

Current constituency
- Created: 2011
- Party: Tisza Party
- Member: Alexandra Szabó
- Elected: 2026

The 14th constituency of Budapest (Hungarian: Budapesti 14. számú országgyűlési egyéni választókerület) is one of the single-member constituencies of the National Assembly, the national legislature of Hungary. The constituency standard abbreviation: Budapest 14. OEVK.

Since 2026, it has been represented by Alexandra Szabó of the Tisza Party.

== Geography ==
The 14th constituency is located in eastern part of Pest.

=== List of districts ===
The constituency includes the following municipalities:

1. District XVII.: Full part of the district.
2. District X.: Eastern part (Újhegy and Keresztúridűlő) of the district.

== Members ==
The constituency was first represented by Mónika Dunai of the Fidesz from 2014, and she was re-elected in 2018 and 2022. In the 2026 election, Alexandra Szabó of the Tisza Party was elected representative.

| Election | Member | Party | % |
|---|---|---|---|
| 2014 | Mónika Dunai | Fidesz | 43.0 |
| 2018 | Mónika Dunai | Fidesz | 41.2 |
| 2022 | Mónika Dunai | Fidesz | 44.7 |
| 2026 | Alexandra Szabó | TISZA | 61.5 |
