= Béla Dankó =

Hungarian politician

Member of the National Assembly
- In office 11 October 2010 – 8 May 2026

Personal details
- Born: 13 May 1969 (age 57)
- Party: Fidesz
- Spouse: Ildikó Dankóné Kovács
- Children: Dóra; Csanád Béla; Máté Botond
- Profession: politician

Béla Dankó (born 13 May 1969) is a Hungarian politician, member of the National Assembly (MP) for Szarvas (Békés County Constituency V) from 2010 to 2014, and for Békés (Békés County Constituency II) from 2014 to 2026. He became MP after a by-election, replacing László Domokos, who was appointed President of the State Audit Office. Dankó was a member of the Committee on Local Government and Regional Development, the Committee on Sustainable Development, then the Agriculture Committee.

He also served as the mayor of Kondoros between 1999 and 2014.

Dankó was defeated by Tisza candidate Dávid Gombár in the 2026 Hungarian parliamentary election, thus he lost his parliamentary seat after 15 and a half years.

== Personal life ==
He is married. His wife is Ildikó Dankóné Kovács. They have a daughter, Dóra and two sons, Csanád Béla and Máté Botond.
