= Zsolt V. Németh =

Hungarian politician (born 1963)

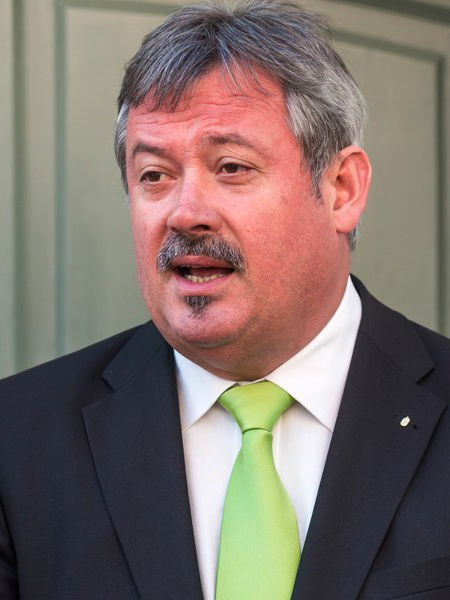

Member of the National Assembly
- Incumbent
- Assumed office 18 June 1998

Mayor of Vasvár
- In office 18 October 1998 – 17 June 2010
- Succeeded by: Matild Kovács
- In office October 1990 – 1994

Personal details
- Born: 12 July 1963 (age 63) Szombathely, Hungary
- Party: Fidesz (National Forum)
- Other political affiliations: MDF (1989–2004)
- Children: 3
- Profession: land surveyor, politician

Zsolt V. Németh (born July 12, 1963) is a Hungarian land surveyor and politician, member of the National Assembly (MP) for Körmend (Vas County Constituency V then III) since 1998. He also served as mayor of Vasvár twice: between 1990 and 1994, and from 1998 to 2010. He was state secretary in the second and third Orbán governments from 2010 to 2018.

== Career ==
He finished the land surveyor programme at Hevesi Ákos Secondary Technical School of Szombathely in 1981. He graduated as a land surveyor production engineer from the Székesfehérvár Land Survey and Estate Allocation College Faculty of the University of Forestry and Wood Industry in 1984.

He graduated from the human resources manager programme at the Faculty of Humanities of Janus Pannonius University of Pécs in 1994. He was the works manager of Public Road Building Partnership of Zalaegerszeg in 1984, later its land surveying engineer. He was the building engineer of Struag Building Construction Company from 1995 to 1996 and of Strabag Hungária Building Company from 1997 to 1998 in Szombathely. He has been the member of the World Federation of Hungarians since 1996, and of the Vasvár Town Embellishment Association since 1998.

Németh was one of the founders of the Vasvár organisation of the Hungarian Democratic Forum (MDF) in April 1989, and he was its chairman from 1989 to 1990. He has been on the National Board of MDF since 1996 and has been county president. On 21 June 2004, shortly after the European Parliament election, he joined the Lakitelek Working Group established at the time by Sándor Lezsák.

As a result, he left the party and its parliamentary group and continued his work as an independent MP until the 2006 parliamentary election.

He was elected mayor of Vasvár in October 1990. He ran as a candidate in the 1994 parliamentary election. He ran for the office of mayor again in the December 1994 local elections but he failed to win that seat. He was representative of the General Assembly of Vas County from 1994 to 1998. He was on the National Board of the Hungarian Democratic Forum from 1996. He was the county chairman of the party. In May 1998 he was elected individual MP representing Constituency V, Körmend, Vas County. He served as a recorder from June 1998 to May 2002. He was deputy parliamentary group leader of the Hungarian Democratic Forum from September 1998 until the end of the term.

On 18 October 1998, he was elected mayor of Vasvár again. In the first round of the April 2002 parliamentary elections he was elected incumbent MP. He had been on the Local Government Committee since May and on the Police Committee since September 2002. He was also elected one of the recorders. He won the seat of mayor for the third time in Vasvár. He secured a seat in Parliament for Körmend in the 2006 general election. He was elected member of the Committee on Employment and Labour on 30 May 2006.

After the 2010 parliamentary election he was appointed Secretary of State for Rural Development in the Second Cabinet of Viktor Orbán. As a result, he resigned from his mayoral seat on June 17, 2010.

He served as Secretary of State for Rural Development from June 2, 2010 to June 5, 2014. His position was renamed to Secretary of State for Environment, Agrarian Development and Hungaricums after the 2014 parliamentary election. He held the office between June 15, 2014 and May 17, 2018. After the 2018 parliamentary election, he became a vice-chairman, then member of the Committee on Budgets.
