= Budapest 11th constituency =

Constituency in Hungary (2011-)

Budapest 11th constituency (District IV.)
- Constituency for the National Assembly
- Location of Budapest 11 within Budapest

- Location of Budapest within Hungary
- City: Budapest
- Electorate: 79,524 (2026)
- Major settlements: 3rd District

Current constituency
- Created: 2011
- Party: Tisza Party
- Member: Nikoletta Boda
- Elected: 2026

The 11th constituency of Budapest (Hungarian: Budapesti 11. számú országgyűlési egyéni választókerület) is one of the single-member constituencies of the National Assembly, the national legislature of Hungary. The constituency standard abbreviation: Budapest 11. OEVK.

Since 2026, it has been represented by Nikoletta Boda of the Tisza Party

== Geography ==
The 11th constituency is located in the northern part of Buda.

=== List of districts ===
The constituency includes the following municipality:

- District III.(Except the southwestern and southern part of the municipality)

== Members ==
The constituency was first represented by Péter Kiss of MSZP (with Unity support) until his death in 2014. Imre Horváth served one term before László Varju of the DK was elected in 2018. Varju was re-elected in 2022 (with United for Hungary support).In the 2026 election, Nikoletta Boda of the Tisza Party was elected representative.

Election	Member	Party	%
2014	Péter Kiss	MSZP	40.7
2014 by-election	Imre Horváth	MSZP	50.2
2018	László Varju	DK	40.8
2022	László Varju	DK	50.8
2026	Nikoletta Boda	TISZA	64.3

== Election result ==
=== 2026 election ===
Result 2026
1. Nikoletta Boda, Tisza (64.3%)
2. Ádám Gyepes, Fidesz–KDNP (27.9%)
3. Anna Marosvölgyi, Our Homeland (4.79%)
4. György Nagy Richard, DK (1.83%)
5. Kálmán Tóth, MKKP (1.23%)

2026 parliamentary election: Budapest - 11th constituency
Party	Candidate	Votes	%	±%
Tisza	Nikoletta Boda	43,122	64.29	New
Fidesz–KDNP	Ádám Gyepes	18,685	27.86	−11.22
Mi Hazánk	Anna Marosvölgyi	3,214	4.79	+0,32
DK	György Nagy Richard	1,228	1.83	As EM
MKKP	Kálmán Tóth	823	1.23	−2.28
Majority		24,437	36.43	
Turnout		67,427	84.79	▲12.81
Registered electors		79,524		
Tisza gain from United for Hungary		Swing		
