= Csongrád-Csanád County 1st constituency =

Constituency in Hungary (2012-)

Csongrád-Csanád County 1st constituency (Szeged)
- Constituency for the National Assembly
- Location of Csongrád-Csanád county 01 within Csongrád-Csanád county

- Location of Csongrád-Csanád county within Hungary
- County: Csongrád-Csanád
- Electorate: 84,006 (2018)
- Major settlements: Szeged

Current constituency
- Created: 2011 (modified 2024)
- Party: Tisza Party
- Member: Péter Stumpf
- Elected: 2026

The 1st constituency of Csongrád-Csanád County (Hungarian: Csongrád-Csanád megyei 01. számú országgyűlési egyéni választókerület) is one of the single member constituencies of the National Assembly, the national legislature of Hungary. The constituency standard abbreviation: Csongrád-Csanád 01. OEVK.

Since 2026, it has been represented by Péter Stumpf of the Tisza Party.

== Geography ==
The 1st constituency is located in southern part of Csongrád-Csanád County.

=== List of municipalities ===
The constituency includes the following municipalities:

1. Szeged: Northern part of the city.

== Members ==
The constituency was first represented by Sándor Szabó of MSZP (with Unity support) from 2014, and he was re-elected in 2018 and 2022 (with United for Hungary support). In the 2026 election, Péter Stumpf of the Tisza Party was elected representative.

Election	Member	Party	%	Ref.
2014 (Note: Szabó was a member of MSZP, he ran as a joint candidate of the Unity electoral alliance during the 2014 parliamentary election.)	Sándor Szabó	MSZP	39.43	
2018	Sándor Szabó	MSZP	43.67	
2022 (Note: Szabó was a member of MSZP. He ran as a joint candidate of the United for Hungary electoral alliance during the 2022 parliamentary election.)	Sándor Szabó	MSZP	49.51	
2026	Péter Stumpf	Tisza Party	67.85	
