= Tolna County 1st constituency =

Parliamentary constituency in Hungary

- Constituency for the National Assembly
- Location of Tolna county 01 within Tolna county

- Location of Tolna county within Hungary
- County: Tolna County
- Population: 69,292 (2022)
- Major settlements: Szekszárd

Current constituency
- Created: 2011
- Party: Tisza Party
- Member: József Sárosi
- Elected: 2026

The Tolna County 1st parliamentary constituency is one of the 106 constituencies into which the territory of Hungary is divided by Act CCIII of 2011, and in which voters can elect one member of parliament. The standard abbreviation of the name of the constituency is: Tolna 01. OEVK. Seat: Szekszárd.

== Area ==
The constituency includes the following settlements:

1. Alsónyék
2. Báta
3. Bátaszék
4. Bogyiszló
5. Decs
6. Fácánkert
7. Fadd
8. Medina
9. Őcsény
10. Pörböly
11. Sárpilis
12. Sióagárd
13. Szedres
14. Szekszárd
15. Tengelic
16. Tolna
17. Várdomb

== Members of parliament ==
Name	Party	Term	Election
István Horváth	Fidesz-KDNP	2014 –	Results of the 2014 parliamentary election:
István Horváth	Fidesz-KDNP	2014 –	Results of the 2018 parliamentary election:
István Horváth	Fidesz-KDNP	2014 –	Results of the 2022 parliamentary election:
József Sárosi	Tisza Party	2026 – present	Results of the 2026 parliamentary election: 51.57%

== Demographics ==
Historical population
Year	Pop.	±%
2011	76,595	—
2022	69,292	−9.5%

The demographics of the constituency are as follows. The population of Tolna County constituency No. 1 was 69,292 on October 1, 2022. The population of the constituency decreased by 7,303 between the 2011 and 2022 censuses. Based on the age composition, the majority of the population in the constituency is middle-aged with 24,928 people, while the least is children with 11,568 people. 82.1% of the population of the constituency has internet access.

According to the highest level of completed education, those with a high school diploma are the most numerous, with 18,370 people, followed by skilled workers with 14,893 people.

According to economic activity, almost half of the population is employed, 32,503 people, the second most significant group is inactive earners, who are mainly pensioners, with 19,127 people.

The most significant ethnic group in the constituency is German (1,818 people) and Gypsy (1,467 people). The proportion of foreign citizens without Hungarian citizenship is 0.6%.

According to religious composition, the largest religion of the residents of the constituency is Roman Catholic (18,891 people), and there is also a significant community of Calvinists (4,745 people). The number of those not belonging to a religious community is also significant (9,421 people), the second largest group in the constituency after the Roman Catholic religion.

== Sources ==
- ↑ Vjt.: "2011. évi CCIII. törvény az országgyűlési képviselők választásáról". Nemzeti Jogszabálytár. Magyar Közlöny Lap- és Könyvkiadó Kft.
- ↑ KSH: "Az országgyűlési egyéni választókerületek adatai". Népszámlálás 2011. Központi Statisztikai Hivatal.
