= Pest County 10th constituency =

- Constituency for the National Assembly
- Location of Pest county 10 within Pest county

- Location of Pest county within Hungary
- County: Pest County
- Electorate: 73,888 (2026)
- Major settlements: Szigetszentmiklós

Current constituency
- Created: 2024
- Party: Tisza Party
- Member: Andrea Perticsné Kácsor
- Elected: 2026

The Pest County 10th parliamentary constituency is one of the 106 constituencies into which the territory of Hungary is divided by Act LXXIX of 2024, and in which voters can elect one member of the National Assembly. The standard abbreviation of the constituency name is: Pest 10. OEVK. The seat is: Szigetszentmiklós.

== Area ==
The constituency includes the following settlements:

1. Dunaharaszti
2. Halásztelek
3. Szigethalom
4. Szigetszentmiklós

== Members of parliament ==
Name	Party	Term	Election
Tibor Pogácsás	Fidesz-KDNP	2014 –	Results of the 2014 parliamentary election:
Tibor Pogácsás	Fidesz-KDNP	2014 –	Results of the 2018 parliamentary election:
Tibor Pogácsás	Fidesz-KDNP	2014 –	Results of the 2022 parliamentary election:
Andrea Perticsné Kácsor	Tisza Party	2026 – present	Results of the 2026 parliamentary election: 62.11%

== Demographics ==
Historical population
Year	Pop.	±%
2011	93,494	—
2022	98,189	+5.0%

The demographics of the constituency are as follows. The population of the 10th constituency of Pest County was 98,189 on 1 October 2022. The population of the constituency increased by 4,695 between the 2011 and 2022 censuses. Based on the age composition, the majority of the population in the constituency is middle-aged with 35,361 people, while the fewest are elderly with 16,960 people. 84.8% of the population of the constituency has internet access.

According to the highest level of completed education, those with a high school diploma are the most numerous, with 27,412 people, followed by skilled workers with 20,523 people.

According to economic activity, almost half of the population is employed, 50,018 people, the second most significant group is inactive earners, who are mainly pensioners, with 19,975 people.

The most significant ethnic group in the constituency is the Gypsy with 1,571 people and the Hungarians with 1,262 people. The proportion of foreign citizens without Hungarian citizenship is 1%.

According to religious composition, the largest religion of the residents of the constituency is Roman Catholic (18,823 people), and a significant community is the Calvinist (9,275 people). The number of those not belonging to a religious community is also significant (11,379 people), the second largest group in the constituency after the Roman Catholic religion.

== Parliamentary elections ==
=== 2022 ===
Candidate	Party	Votes	%	
Pogácsás Tibor	FIDESZ-KDNP	30,973	59.71%	$\surd$
Szabó Rebeka	DK-JOBBIK-MOMENTUM-MSZP-LMP-PÁRBESZÉD	14,797	28.52%	
László Attila	MI HAZÁNK	3,901	7.52%	
Kőhegyi Róbert	MKKP	1,528	2.95%	
Zrubka Zita	MEMO	677	1.31%	
