= Gyula Kovács (21st-century politician) =

Hungarian politician

Member of the National Assembly
- Assuming office 9 May 2026
- Succeeding: Sándor Lezsák
- Constituency: Bács-Kiskun 4th

Personal details
- Born: 1972 or 1973 (age 52–53)
- Party: Tisza

Gyula Kovács (born 1972 or 1973) is a Hungarian politician who was elected member of the National Assembly in 2026 representing the Bács-Kiskun County 4th constituency. He previously worked as a gastroenterologist.
