= Nikoletta Boda =

Hungarian politician

Member of the National Assembly
- Incumbent
- Assumed office 9 May 2026
- Preceded by: László Varju
- Constituency: Budapest 11th

Personal details
- Party: TISZA

Nikoletta Boda is a Hungarian politician who was elected member of the National Assembly in 2026. She previously worked as a finance director.
