= Péter Stumpf =

Hungarian politician

Member of the National Assembly
- Assuming office 9 May 2026
- Succeeding: Sándor Szabó
- Constituency: Csongrád-Csanád County 1st

Personal details
- Born: 1987 or 1988 (age 37–38)
- Party: Tisza Party

Péter Stumpf is a Hungarian politician who was elected member of the National Assembly in 2026. He is an assistant professor of political science at the University of Szeged.
