= Győr-Moson-Sopron County 1st constituency =

Constituency in Hungary (2012-)

Győr-Moson-Sopron County 1st constituency (Győr)
- Constituency for the National Assembly
- Location of Győr-Moson-Sopron county 01 within Győr-Moson-Sopron county

- Location of Győr-Moson-Sopron county within Hungary
- County: Győr-Moson-Sopron
- Electorate: 66,579 (2022)
- Major settlements: Győr

Current constituency
- Created: 2011; 15 years ago
- Party: Tisza Party
- Member: Judit Diószegi
- Elected: 2026

The 1st constituency of Győr-Moson-Sopron County (Hungarian: Győr-Moson-Sopron megyei 01. számú országgyűlési egyéni választókerület) is one of the single member constituencies of the National Assembly, the national legislature of Hungary. The constituency standard abbreviation: Győr-Moson-Sopron 01. OEVK.

Since 2026, it has been represented by Judit Diószegi of the Tisza Party.

== Geography ==
The 1st constituency is located in north-eastern part of Győr-Moson-Sopron County.

=== List of municipalities ===
The constituency includes the following municipalities:

1. Győr: Main part of the city (except southern and eastern suburban parts).
2. Kisbajcs
3. Nagybajcs
4. Vének

== Members ==
The constituency was first represented by Róbert Balázs Simon of the Fidesz from 2014, and he was re-elected in 2018 and 2022. In the 2026 election, Judit Diószegi of the Tisza Party was elected representative.

| Election | Member | Party | % | Ref. |
|---|---|---|---|---|
| 2014 | Róbert Balázs Simon | Fidesz | 48.76 | |
| 2018 | Róbert Balázs Simon | Fidesz | 49.55 | |
| 2022 | Róbert Balázs Simon | Fidesz | 50.44 | |
| 2026 | Judit Diószegi | TISZA | 60.22 | |
