= Judit Diószegi =

Hungarian politician

Member of the National Assembly
- Assuming office 9 May 2026
- Succeeding: Róbert Balázs Simon
- Constituency: Győr-Moson-Sopron 1st

Personal details
- Party: Tisza

Judit Diószegi is a Hungarian politician who was elected member of the National Assembly in 2026 representing the Győr-Moson-Sopron County 1st constituency. She previously worked as a police officer.
