= Katalin Csöbör =

Hungarian politician

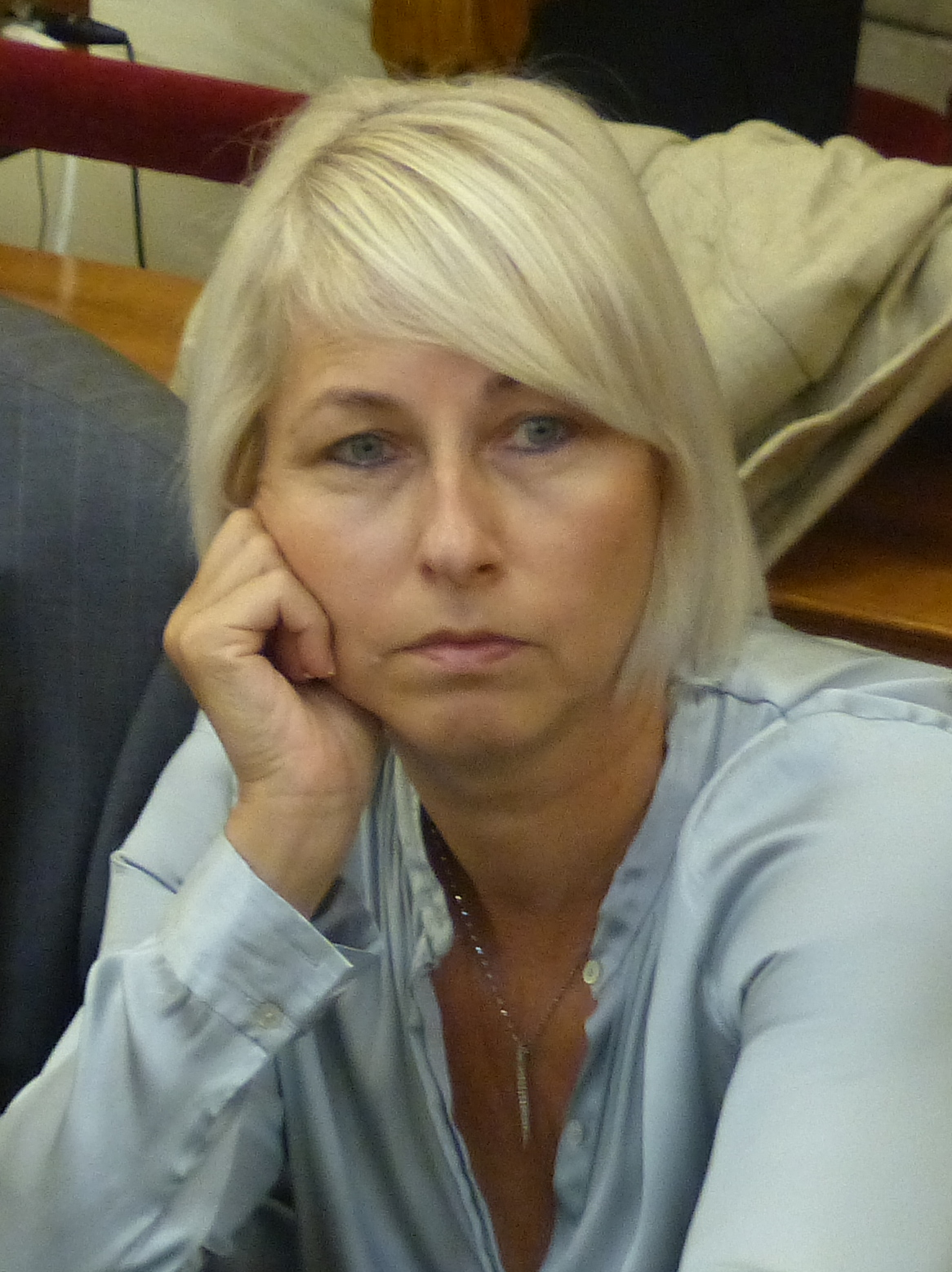

Member of the National Assembly
- In office 14 May 2010 – 8 May 2026

Personal details
- Born: 20 January 1965 (age 61) Miskolc, Hungary
- Party: Fidesz
- Spouse: György Mike
- Children: Pál; Martin
- Profession: politician

Katalin Csöbör (born 20 January 1965) is a Hungarian politician, member of the National Assembly (MP) for Miskolc (Borsod-Abaúj-Zemplén County Constituency I) from 2010 to 2026. She was Deputy Mayor of Alsózsolca between 2010 and 2014.

She was a member of the Committee on Human Rights, Minority, Civic and Religious Affairs from 14 May 2010 to 5 May 2014, the Committee on Foreign Affairs from 6 May 2014 to 7 May 2018, and European Affairs Committee from 6 May 2014 to 4 July 2022. She finished her parliamentary career as a member of the Committee of Culture (from 2 May 2022 to 8 May 2026). After four consecutive victories, she was defeated by Tisza candidate Roland Juhász in the 2026 Hungarian parliamentary election.

== Personal life ==
She is married to György Mike. They have two sons, Pál and Martin.
