= János Bencsik =

Hungarian politician

Member of the National Assembly
- Incumbent
- Assumed office 16 May 2006
- In office 18 June 1998 – 30 August 1998

Personal details
- Born: 31 July 1965 (age 60) Szarvas, Hungary
- Party: SZDSZ, Fidesz
- Spouse: Mária Szász
- Children: János; Krisztina; Annamária; Magor; Hanga
- Profession: politician

János Bencsik (born 31 July 1965) is a Hungarian politician, who served as Mayor of Tatabánya from 1990 to 2010. He was appointed State Secretary for Climate Change and Energy in the Ministry of National Development on 12 December 2010. He announced his resignation on 2 December 2011. He was replaced by Pál Kovács.

He is a member of the National Assembly (MP) in 1998 and since 2006. He represented Tatabánya (Komárom-Esztergom County Constituency I) from 14 May 2010 to 8 May 2026. He was elected a member of the Economic and Information Technology Committee on 30 December 2011. He was the vice-chairman of the Committee on Sustainable Development from June 2014 to May 2026. Bencsik was defeated by Tisza candidate Ildikó Éva Sopov in Tatabánya constituency during the 2026 Hungarian parliamentary election. Nevertheless, he was selected as MP via the national list of Fidesz–KDNP by the party presidium. He was appointed chairman of the Finance and Budget Committee.

== Personal life ==
He is married to Mária Szász. They have five children together, three daughters - Krisztina, Annamária, Hanga and two sons, János and Magor.

Political offices
Preceded by office established	Mayor of Tatabánya; 1990–2010	Succeeded by Csaba Schmidt
