= Anna Müller (politician) =

Hungarian politician

Member of the National Assembly
- Assuming office 9 May 2026
- Succeeding: Zoltán Vajda
- Constituency: Budapest 13th

Personal details
- Party: Tisza

Anna Müller is a Hungarian politician who was elected member of the National Assembly in 2026 representing the Budapest 13th constituency. She previously worked as a mathematics and chemistry teacher.
