= Tibor Pogácsás =

Hungarian engineer and politician

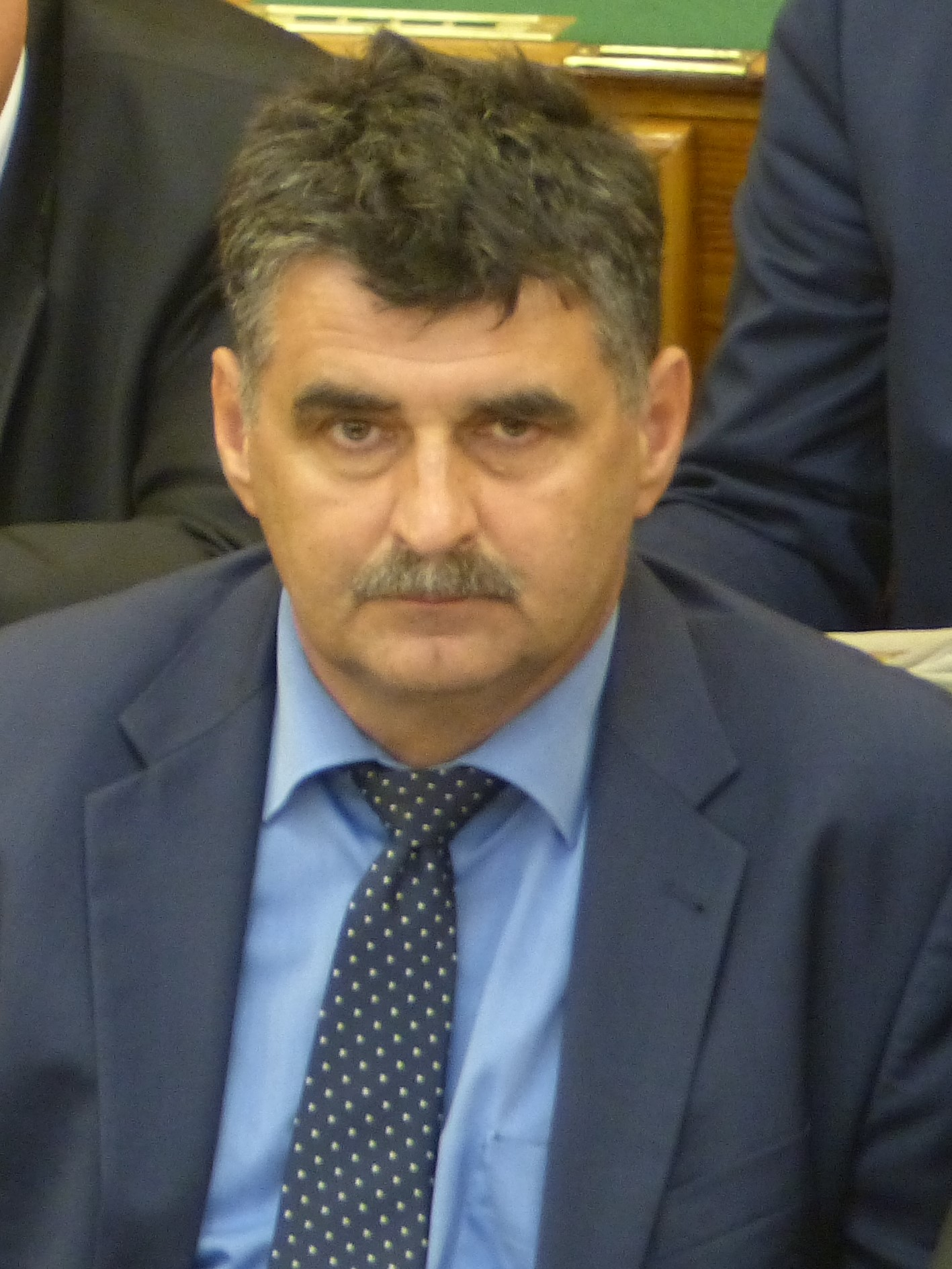

Member of the National Assembly
- In office 14 May 2010 – 8 May 2026
- In office 18 June 1998 – 15 May 2006

Personal details
- Born: 4 April 1964 (age 62) Budapest, Hungary
- Party: Fidesz (since 1990)
- Spouse: Andrea Pogácsásné Berecz
- Children: Réka; Dóra; Fanni
- Profession: engineer, politician

Tibor Pogácsás (born 4 April 1964) is a Hungarian engineer and politician, member of the National Assembly (MP) for Monor (Pest County Constituency VII then X) from 1998 to 2002 and from 2010 to 2026. He was also MP from the Pest County Regional List of Fidesz between 2002 and 2006. He served as the mayor of Monor between 1998 and 2014.

In the national election of 1998 he was elected as MP for Monor (Constituency VII, Pest County). He became a member of the Committee on Regional Development. He was elected Mayor of Monor for the first time in 1998. In the general election in 2002 he was elected an MP from the party's the Pest County Regional List. Since the middle of May he had been working in the Police Committee. He was re-elected as Mayor of Monor on 20 October 2002.

He lost his parliamentary seat during the parliamentary election in 2006, however he was able to hold his mayoral seat in October 2006. He was elected MP for Monor in the 2010 parliamentary election for the second time. He became a member of the Committee on Local Government and Regional Development on 14 May 2010. Following the 2014 parliamentary election, Pogácsás was one of the recorders of the National assembly for a short time, between May and June 2014. He was appointed Secretary of State for Local Government on 15 June 2014.

== Personal life ==
He is married. His wife is Andrea Pogácsásné Berecz. They have three daughters, Réka, Dóra and Fanni.
