= 1990 Hungarian presidential election referendum =

- 29 July 1990
- Do you want the president of the republic to be elected directly?
- Outcome: Proposal failed due to low voter turnout

Results
| Choice | Votes | % |
|---|---|---|
| Yes | 926,823 | 85.90% |
| No | 152,076 | 14.10% |
| Valid votes | 1,078,899 | 99.17% |
| Invalid or blank votes | 9,069 | 0.83% |
| Total votes | 1,087,968 | 100.00% |
| Registered voters/turnout | 7,820,161 | 13.91% |

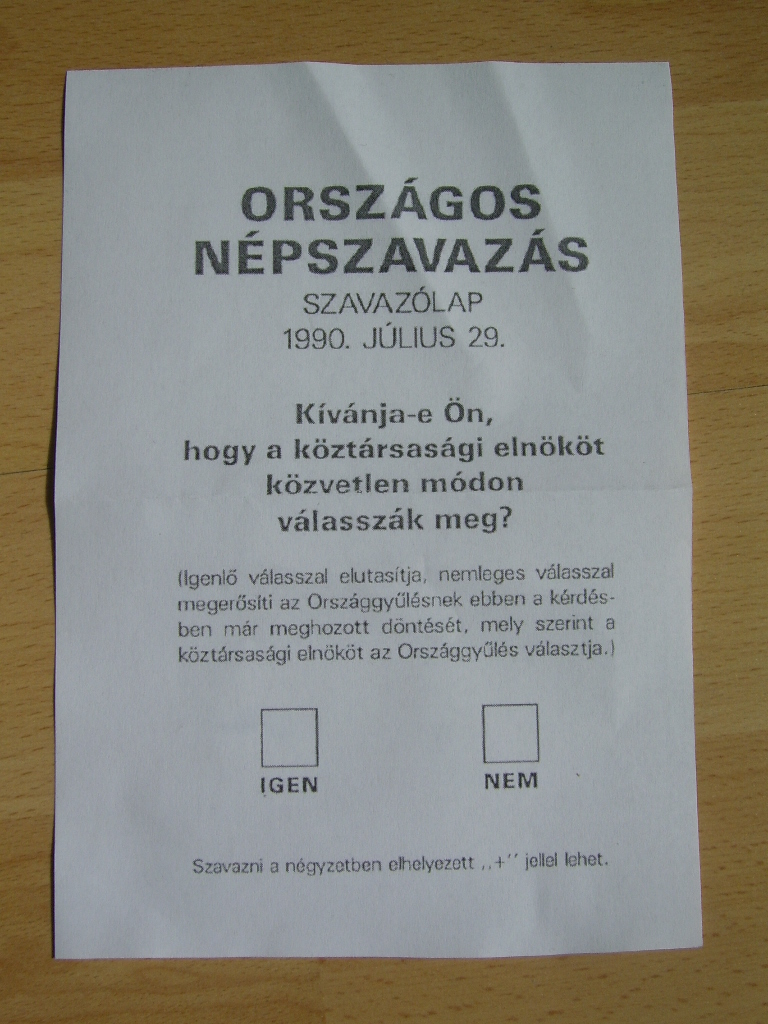
Ballot paper for the 1990 Hungarian presidential election referendum

A referendum on introducing direct elections for the Presidency was held in Hungary on 29 July 1990. Although the proposal was supported by 86% of voters, voter turnout was just 14%, resulting in the referendum being declared invalid. As a result, the President continued to be elected by the National Assembly.

== Results ==
| Choice | Votes | % |
|---|---|---|
| For | 926,823 | 85.90 |
| Against | 152,076 | 14.10 |
| Total | 1,078,899 | 100.00 |
| Valid votes | 1,078,899 | 99.17 |
| Invalid/blank votes | 9,069 | 0.83 |
| Total votes | 1,087,968 | 100.00 |
| Registered voters/turnout | 7,820,161 | 13.91 |
Source: Nohlen & Stöver
