= Mónika Dunai =

Hungarian-French teacher and politician

Mónika Dunai (born 21 September 1966 in Budapest) is a Hungarian-French teacher and politician. She is a member of National Assembly of Hungary (Országgyűlés) since 2014. In the 2014 and 2018 parliamentary elections, she was elected a Member of Parliament in the Budapest 14th constituency (10th and 17th districts) as a Fidesz candidate.

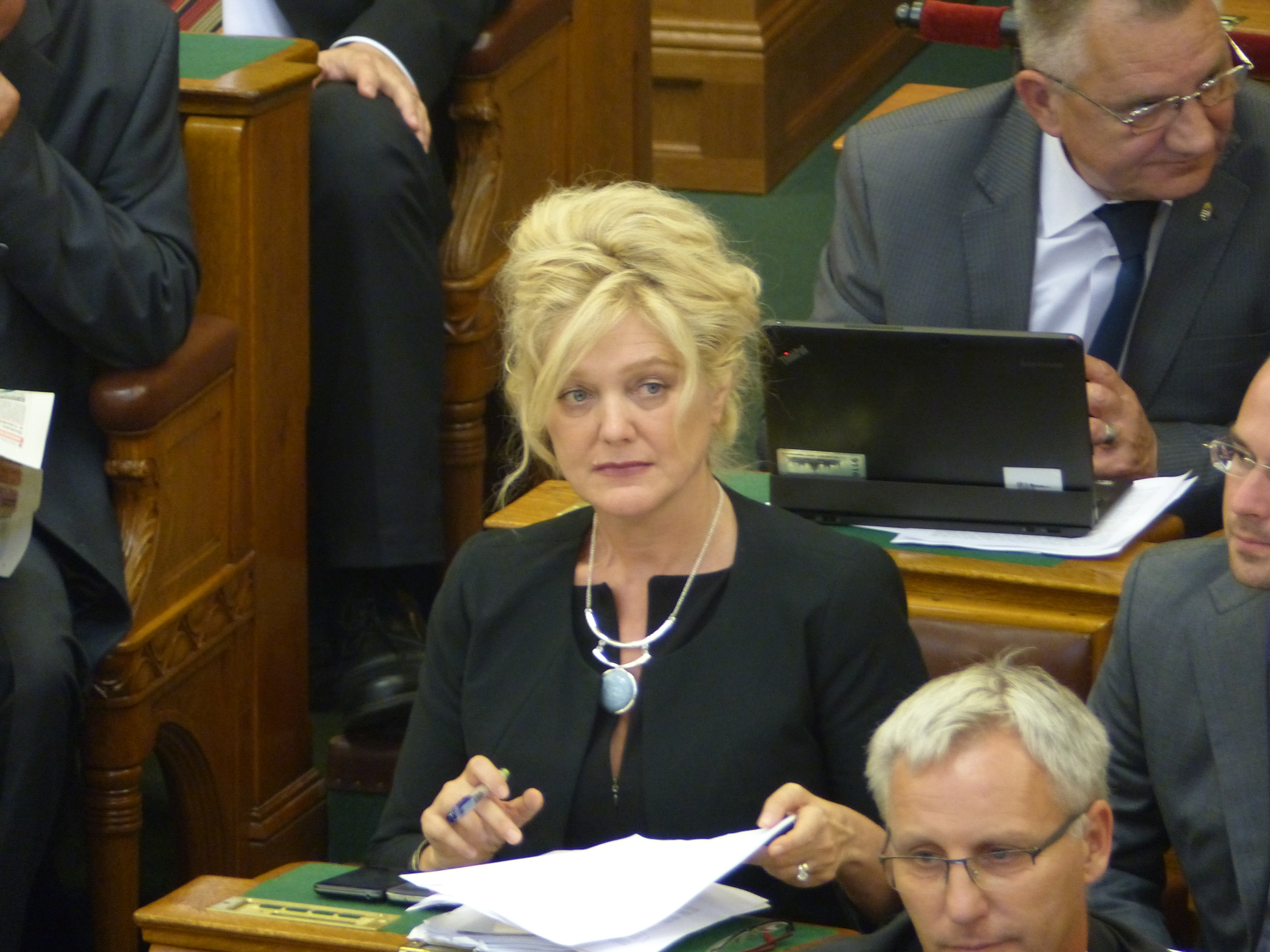
Dunai in 2016
