= László Vécsey =

Hungarian politician (born 1958)

Member of the National Assembly
- In office 14 May 2010 – 8 May 2026

Personal details
- Born: September 1, 1958 (age 67) Gödöllő, Hungary
- Party: MDF (1988–1989); Fidesz (since 1989)
- Profession: civil engineer, politician

László Vécsey (born 1 September 1958) is a Hungarian politician, mayor of Szada from 1998 to 2014 and member of the National Assembly (MP) for Gödöllő (Pest County Constituency IV then VI) from 2010 to 2026.

He was a member of the Committee on Employment and Labour from 2010 to 2014, and member then vice-chairman of the Legislative Committee from 2014 to 2026. He did not run in the 2026 Hungarian parliamentary election.

He was born into the baronial branch of old noble Vécsey family.
