= László Pósán =

Hungarian historian and politician

Member of the National Assembly
- In office 18 June 1998 – 8 May 2026

Personal details
- Born: 20 September 1965 (age 60) Fehérgyarmat, Hungary
- Party: Fidesz (since 1992)
- Spouse: Annamária Pósánné Rácz
- Children: Zsuzsanna
- Profession: historian, politician

Dr. László Pósán (born 20 September 1965) is a Hungarian historian, politician, member of the National Assembly (MP) for Debrecen (Hajdú-Bihar County Constituency I then II) from 1998 to 2026.

== Biography ==
He finished Krúdy Gyula Secondary School at Nyíregyháza in 1984. In 1990 he graduated from Kossuth Lajos University of Debrecen as a teacher of Hungarian language, literature and history. From 1990 he was an assistant lecturer and from 1996 a lecturer of the Institute of History and the Department of Middle Ages and Early Modern Age History at Kossuth Lajos University of Debrecen. He was one of the editors of the journal Debreceni Szemle ("Debrecen Review") from 1993 to 1998. He received a Ph.D. degree in 2000 and became an associate professor. Since 1992 he has been the secretary of Ady Academy Foundation and since 1998, secretary of the Apáczai Foundation.

His area of interest for teaching and research is the military history of the Middle Ages in Europe, especially Medieval Prussia, crusades, Teutonic Order and their role in the Kingdom of Hungary.

He joined Fidesz in 1992. He has headed the Debrecen local branch of the party since 1997. In the course of the development of the organisational structure of Fidesz-Hungarian Civic Union in 2003 he was charged with heading of his constituency, Debrecen I. He was elected MP for Debrecen in the parliamentary election in 1998. From 1998 to 2002 he worked for the Foreign Affairs Committee and he was deputy member of the Hungarian delegation to NATO Parliamentary Assembly. He was re-elected as an MP in the first round of the elections on 7 April 2002. He secured a seat in Parliament in the 2006 general election. He was elected member of the Committee on Education and Science on 30 May 2006. He defended his mandate during the 2010 parliamentary election and became Vice Chairman of the Committee on Education, Science and Research on 14 May 2010. He was also appointed a member of the Committee on Health Affairs and later Committee on Audit Office and Budget. He was the Chairman of the Committee on Culture from 2018 to 2026.

He was replaced as individual candidate for Debrecen by the Fidesz presidium for the 2026 Hungarian parliamentary election. Although his name appeared in his party's national list, he did not secure a mandate.

== Personal life ==
He is married. His wife is Annamária Pósánné Rácz. They have a daughter, Zsuzsanna.
