= Tamás Vargha =

Hungarian politician

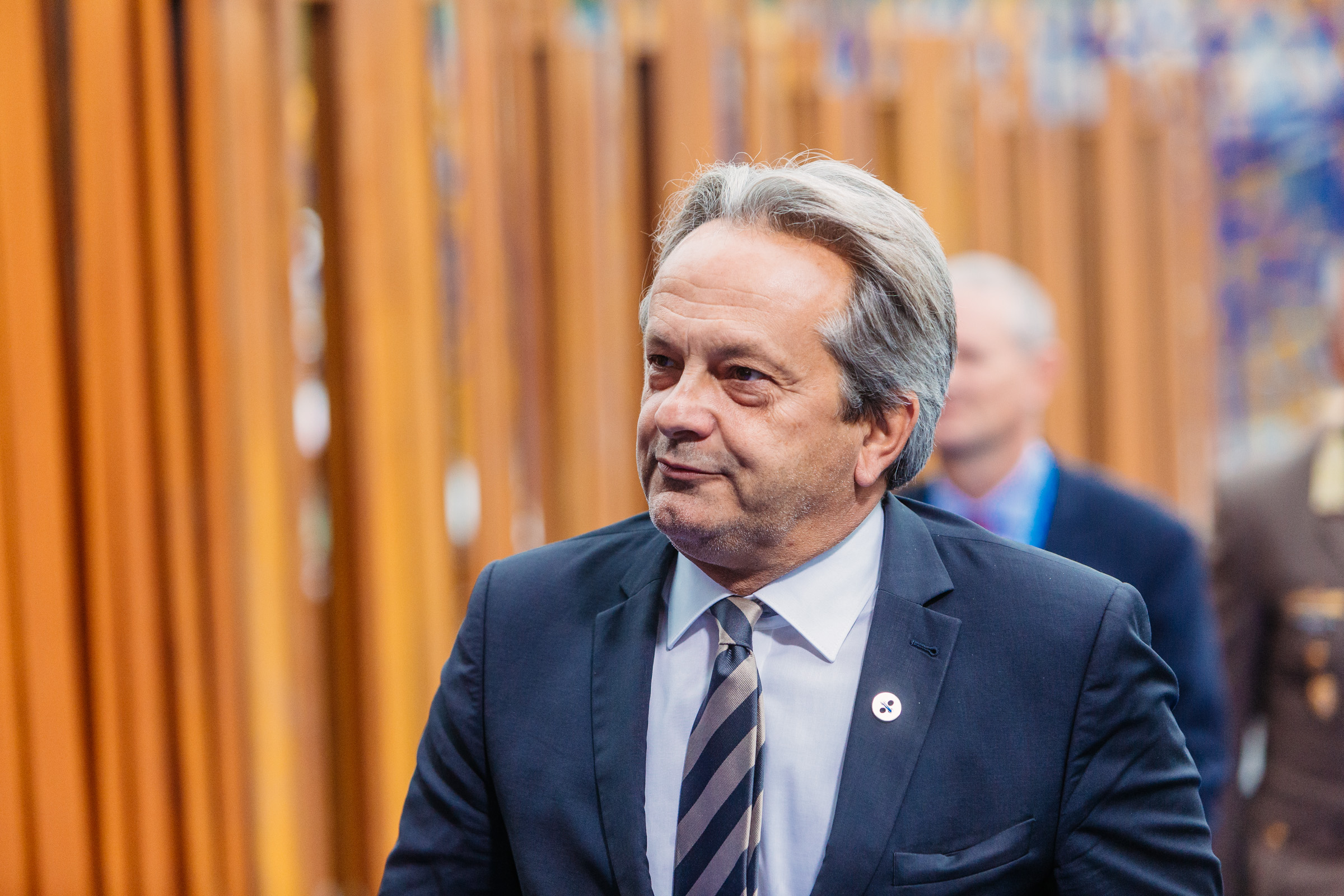

Secretary of State for Defence
- In office 16 October 2012 – 17 May 2018
- Minister: Csaba Hende; István Simicskó
- Preceded by: István Simicskó
- Succeeded by: Szilárd Németh

Member of the National Assembly
- Incumbent
- Assumed office 14 May 2010

Personal details
- Born: 2 February 1959 (age 67) Székesfehérvár, Hungary
- Party: Fidesz
- Children: 4
- Profession: teacher, politician

Tamás Vargha (born 2 February 1959) is a Hungarian teacher and politician, member of the National Assembly (MP) for Székesfehérvár (Fejér County Constituency II then I) since 2010. He served as Secretary of State for Defence from 16 October 2012 to 17 May 2018. Currently, he is the Secretary of State for Civil Intelligence within the Ministry of Foreign Affairs and Trade since 23 June 2018.

Vargha served as President of the General Assembly of Fejér County between 8 October 2010 and 16 October 2012, when he was appointed state secretary. He was a member of the Committee on Foreign Affairs from 14 May 2010 and Defence and Internal Security Committee from 10 October 2011 until 12 November 2012. He also functioned as a vice-chairman of the National Security Committee for a short time between 4 June and 2 July 2018, until his appointment as state secretary in the Fourth Orbán Government.
