= Budapest 6th constituency =

Hungarian legislative district

Coordinates: 47°28′30″N 19°04′49″E

Budapest 6th constituency (District VIII.)
- Constituency for the National Assembly
- Location of Budapest 06 within Budapest

- Location of Budapest within Hungary
- City: Budapest
- Electorate: 72,205 (2018)
- Major settlements: District VIII.

Current constituency
- Created: 2011
- Party: Tisza Party
- Member: György László Velkey
- Created from: Constituency no. 11; Constituency no. 12; Constituency no. 13
- Elected: 2026

The 6th constituency of Budapest (Hungarian: Budapesti 06. számú országgyűlési egyéni választókerület) is one of the single-member constituencies of the National Assembly, the national legislature of Hungary. The constituency standard abbreviation: Budapest 06. OEVK.

Since 2018, it has been represented by György László Velkey of the Tisza Party.

== Geography ==
The 6th constituency is located in the central-western part of Pest.

The constituency borders the 5th- and 8th constituencies to the north, the 9th constituency to the east, the 16th constituency to the southeast, and the 17th constituency to the southwest, and the 18th, 2nd and 1st constituencies to the west.

=== List of districts ===
The constituency includes the following municipalities:

1. District VIII.: Main part of the district (except Palotanegyed).
2. District IX.: Main part of the district (except Belső-Ferencváros).

== History ==
The current 6th constituency of Budapest was created in 2011 and contains parts of the pre-2011 11th, 12th and 13th constituencies of Budapest. Its borders have not changed since its creation.

== Members ==
The constituency was first represented by Imre Vas of the Fidesz from 2014 to 2018. Máté Kocsis of the Fidesz was elected in 2018.

In 2022, the constituency was won by András Jámbor of the left-wing Spark Movement, running on the unified opposition platform. In the 2026 election, György László Velkey of the Tisza Party was elected representative.

Election	Member	Party	%
2014	Imre Vas	Fidesz	38.3
2018	Máté Kocsis	Fidesz	40.5
2022	András Jámbor	Dialogue	48.3
2026	György László Velkey	TISZA	53.6

== Election result ==
=== 2026 election ===
Result 2026
1. György László Velkey, TISZA (53.6%)
2. Béla Radics, Fidesz–KDNP (24.7%)
3. Ákos Hadházy, Independent (16.1%)
4. Viktória Pércsi, Our Homeland (4.50%)
5. Dávid Nagy, MKKP (1.20%)

2026 parliamentary election: Budapest - 6th constituency
Party	Candidate	Votes	%	±%
Tisza	György László Velkey	33,953	53.62	New
Fidesz–KDNP	Béla Radics	15,612	24.65	−17.13
Independent	Dr. Ákos Hadházy	10,207	16.12	
Mi Hazánk	Viktória Pércsi	2,825	4.46	−0.4
MKKP	Dávid Nagy	730	1.15	−3.2
DK	Dr. Zoltán Komaromi	0	0	
Majority		18,341	28.97	
Turnout		63,687	81.38	▲15.81
Registered electors		78,254		
Tisza gain from United for Hungary		Swing		

=== 2022 election ===
Result 2022
1. András Jámbor, United for Hungary (48.3%)
2. Botond Sára, Fidesz–KDNP (41.8%)
3. Dóra Dúró, Our Homeland (4.90%)
4. Zsuzsanna Döme, MKKP (4.30%)
5. Béla Hanga, NÉP (0.70%)

2022 parliamentary election: Budapest - 6th constituency
Party	Candidate	Votes	%	±%
United for Hungary	András Jámbor	21,462	48.31	
Fidesz–KDNP	Botond Sára	18,561	41.78	+1.27
Mi Hazánk	Dóra Dúró	2,159	4.86	New
MKKP	Zsuzsanna Döme	1,933	4.35	+2.06
NÉP	Béla Hanga	307	0.69	New
Majority		2,907	6.53	
Turnout		44,953	65.67	▲0.79
Registered electors		68,448		
United for Hungary gain from Fidesz–KDNP		Swing	-1.8	

=== 2018 election ===
Result 2018
1. Máté Kocsis, Fidesz–KDNP (40.5%)
2. Attila Ara-Kovács, DK (32.2%)
3. Dóra Dúró, Jobbik (12.9%)
4. Tamás Jakabfy, LMP (5.60%)
5. Krisztina Baranyi, Together (3.10%)
6. Dr. Katalin Cseh, Momentum (2.60%)
7. Veronika Juhász, MKKP (2.30%)
8. Other parties (less than 1%) (0.80%)

2018 parliamentary election: Budapest - 6th constituency
Party	Candidate	Votes	%	±%
Fidesz–KDNP	Máté Kocsis	18,818	40.51	+2.26
DK	Attila Ara-Kovács	14,947	32.17	as Unity
Jobbik	Dóra Dúró	6,001	12.92	−0.39
LMP	Tamás Jakabfy	2,582	5.56	−2.76
Together	Krisztina Baranyi	1,454	3.13	as Unity
Momentum	Dr. Katalin Cseh	1,190	2.56	New
MKKP	Gábor Racskó	1,065	2.29	New
Workers' Party	László József Konczos	222	0.48	
MIÉP	Tamás Jakab	105	0.23	
KÖSSZ	Krisztina Schauber	39	0.08	
Iránytű	Dr. Dezső Suda	33	0.07	
Majority		3,871	8.34	
Turnout		46,850	64.88	▲7.97
Registered electors		72,205		
Fidesz–KDNP hold		Swing	+7.1	

=== 2014 election ===
Result 2014
1. Dr. Imre Vas, Fidesz–KDNP (38.3%)
2. Tibor Gyula Pál, Unity (37.0%)
3. Dóra Dúró, Jobbik (13.3%)
4. Tamás Jakabfy, LMP (8.30%)
5. Other parties (less than 1%) (3.10%)

2014 parliamentary election: Budapest - 6th constituency
Party	Candidate	Votes	%	±%
Fidesz–KDNP	Dr. Imre Vas	15,977	38.25	
Unity	Tibor Gyula Pál	15,437	36.97	
Jobbik	Dóra Dúró	5,560	13.31	
LMP	Tamás Jakabfy	3,474	8.32	
Independent	Lajos Csorba	323	0.77	
Party of Greens	Péter Lóránt Hollós	293	0.7	
MCP	Aladár Horváth	212	0.51	
Soc Dems	Dr. Dezső József Suda	187	0.45	
KTI	Istvánné Makai	122	0.29	
JESZ	Gábor Cézár Szilassy	113	0.27	
ÚDP	Rita Cseh	43	0.1	
ÚMP	Zsolt Torma	29	0.07	
Majority		540	1.29	
Turnout		42,271	56.91	
Registered electors		74,277		
Fidesz–KDNP win (new seat)				
