= Central-Eastern European Green Left Alliance =

Left-wing and green European political alliance

- Abbreviation: CEEGLA
- Founded: 12 January 2024
- Ideology: Democratic socialism Social democracy Progressivism; Green politics Pro-Europeanism; Anti-neoliberalism; Anti-Putinism
- Political position: Centre-left to left-wing
- European affiliation: European Left Alliance (As part of Razem)
- Colours: Seafoam; Plum; Magenta

Website
- ceegla.org
- Politics of the European Union; Political parties; Elections; A: While most of the alliance consists of left-wing forces, its established parties lean towards the centre-left, alongside some far-left factions.

The Central-Eastern European Green Left Alliance (CEEGLA) is a European political alliance gathering left-wing and green organisations and parties from Central and Eastern Europe that oppose the Russian invasion of Ukraine. It was officially launched on 12 January 2024 in Warsaw.

== History ==
First discussions of a possible Central-Eastern European left-wing alliance took place between 20-21 April 2023, when representatives from five political parties (Note: Czechia, Budoucnost; Ukraine, SotsRukh; Hungary, Szikra; Poland, Razem; Romania, Demos) organized a meeting in Bucharest. The meeting mostly focused on political cooperation following the Russian invasion of Ukraine, and the future of European Union. Between the first meeting and January of 2024, several preparatory meetings took place prior to CEEGLA being announced.

The alliance was formally launched on 12 January 2024 in the Polish Sejm, with representatives from six member parties (Note: Includes the original 5 parties from the 2023 April meeting, and Lithuania's KArtu party.) taking part in the launch. As part of it, the organization presented 17 core principles, focusing around regional security, social justice, and environmental protections, alongside workers' rights, democratic governance, and support for Ukraine in the context of the Russian invasion.

In 2024, the organization partook in helping member parties campaign for local and European elections on social media. In November of 2024, Szikra organized one of the first CEEGLA-linked events, the LAB-LEFT 2024 international forum. Alliance member Razem became a founding member of the broader European Left Alliance, with other members of CEEGLA attending the first congress in 2025, notably Demos and Budoucnost.

As of November 2026, CEEGLA remains inactive in the public profile, with a last public post in February of 2025. The alliance is presumed to remain active internally to some degree, with their website being updated for 2026. A 2025 analysis of the Central-Eastern European left described the organization as an ongoing project, rather than a failed one.

== Ideology ==
Writing in the American left-wing periodical Jacobin, Polish-American journalist Roman Broszkowski wrote that leftists in Eastern Europe felt that they needed a "separate identity" from Western European leftists that "failed to realize" the potential consequences of the Russian invasion of Ukraine in 2022, and that the formation of CEEGLA in 2024 was meant to "concretize" this sentiment. At the launch event, Claudiu Crăciun of the Democracy and Solidarity Party stated to Broszkowski that "We realized that we live in different worlds and that the left-wing world — Western, South, and Northern — they have different views [on the Russian invasion of Ukraine], and we feel that we have a world here. It’s a European periphery that had independence and sovereignty as major stakes during the 19th and the 20th century, and we know a bit something about...Russian influence in every form."

The organization has been described as a shared political home for pro-European, anti-Putin left-wing political parties in Central and Eastern Europe, emphasizing regional cooperation. All of the parties in CEEGLA are from former members of the Eastern Bloc, and two are former republics of the Soviet Union.

The party's founding statement asserts that the organization sees itself as "a new generation that experienced disillusionment after the collapse of the Eastern Bloc and subsequent capitalist transition. We have neither nostalgia for the previous regimes nor illusions about the nature of the failed neoliberal project being implemented in our region. We need to move forward, not backwards." The statement further asserts that the party supports greater European integration and wishes to support parties and candidates who share similar values "from the Baltic Sea to the Balkans."

== Members ==
Since its founding in 2024, CEEGLA has retained its original 6 members. As of October 2026 however, only Razem is represented in the national legislature, with most other parties being described as having negligible influence.

Country	Name	Leader(s)	Ideology	Registered as a party?	Seats in national legislatures	Government
Czechia	Future; Budoucnost	Jakub Kovařík; Klára Školníková	Democratic socialism Left-wing populism	Yes	0 / 200 Chamber of Deputies 0 / 81 Senate	Extra-parliamentary; Last election 2025
Hungary	Spark Movement; Szikra Mozgalom	Collective leadership	Democratic socialism Left-wing nationalism	Yes	0 / 199 National Assembly	Extra-parliamentary; Represented 2022-2026
Lithuania	KArtu. Left Alliance; KArtu. Kairiųjų aljansas	Andrius Bielskis	Democratic socialism Anti-capitalism	No	0 / 141 Seimas	Extra-parliamentary; Did not run (Note: Due to the Lithuanian law requiring all political parties to be officially registered in order to field candidate lists, KArtu hasn't participated in any election since its founding.)
Poland	Together Party; Partia Razem	Adrian Zandberg; Aleksandra Owca	Social democracy Democratic socialism	Yes	4 / 460 Sejm 0 / 100 Senate	Opposition; Represented since 2019
Romania	Democracy and Solidarity Party; Partidul Democrației și Solidarității	Ionuț Tudor	Democratic socialism Progressivism	Yes	0 / 200 Chamber of Deputies 0 / 136 Senate	Extra-parliamentary; Last election 2024
Ukraine	Social Movement; Соціальний рух (Sotsialnyi rukh)	Vitaly Dudin	Democratic socialism Anti-capitalism	No	0 / 450 Verkhovna Rada	Extra-parliamentary; Last election 2019 (Note: Vitaly Dudin self-nominated himself as the candidate for the party for the 31st electoral district in Kryvyi Rih, failing to win.)

== See also ==
- Eastern Bloc
- European Left Alliance for the People and the Planet
- Nordic Green Left Alliance
- Liberal South East European Network
- Democracy in Europe Movement 2025
