= KArtu =

Together. Left Alliance KArtu. Kairiųjų aljansas
- Leader: Andrius Bielskis
- Founded: 25 January 2022 (as Left Alliance)
- Registered: Not registered
- Membership (2024): 2,093 (claimed, likely fictitious)
- Ideology: Democratic socialism Anti-capitalism; Progressivism
- Political position: Left-wing
- European affiliation: Central-Eastern European Green Left Alliance
- Colours: Orange; Black; Red

Website
- partijakartu.lt (defunct)

KArtu (English: Together), known by the full name KArtu. Left Alliance (Lithuanian: KArtu. Kairiųjų aljansas) is a Lithuanian non-partisan political movement. Between 2024–25 it unsuccessfully attempted to become a left-wing political party in Lithuania.

== History ==
=== Inception ===
The Left Alliance political movement was founded in 2022 with a manifesto by over twenty political figures, including cultural figures, artists, and members of both the Social Democratic Party of Lithuania and the Lithuanian Farmers and Greens Union. In its manifesto, the Left Alliance claimed that Lithuanian politics lack a "progressive left-wing party" and attacked the Social Democrats for insufficient allegiance to their party program and betrayal of left-wing values.

One of the founders of the movement, Andrius Bielskis, had been involved in activism for an alternative left since 2007, in which he was the main ideologue and a founder of Naujoji kairė 95 (English: New Left 95).

In February 2022, KArtu organized a picket in support of the ongoing strike in the chemical plant Achema. In light of ongoing political discussion regarding the promulgation of same-sex partnerships law in Lithuania, it spoke out in favor of immediate legalization of same-sex partnerships.

On 12 January 2024, it became a founding member of the Central-Eastern European Green Left Alliance (CEEGLA) alongside Left Together, Democracy and Solidarity Party, Budoucnost, Social Movement and the Spark Movement.

=== Failed attempt to establish a political party ===
The decision to form a political party was taken in February 2024. Its founding convention took place in Vilnius on 1 May 2024, where the party′s establishment was proclaimed before more than 200 delegates, claiming to represent 2,093 founders whose signatures had been collected. Jolanta Bielskienė, former member of the Social Democratic Party, was elected as its chairwoman. However, in the months that followed, the number of signatures reportedly remained below the legal threshold of 2,000. and there was no attempt made to achieved formal registration with the Ministry of Justice to be able to stand in any elections in the country.

During the second "party" convention, on July 17, 2025, KArtu elected the husband of the previous chairwoman, philosopher Andrius Bielskis as chairman. On 25 November 2025, the Lithuanian youth journal ŠAUKSMAS released an article investigating why KArtu hadn't achieved formal registration. In the article, ŠAUKSMAS anonymously interviewed several former KArtu members who spoke about their experiences within the party, alleging abuses conducted by the party leadership. These alleged abuses include a toxic party environment, non-transparent management and all power being concentrated in the hands of a small circle of senior members.

On 12 December 2025, a statement acknowledged the failure to register as a political party and announced the council′s decision to end efforts to achieve legal incorporation.

== Platform ==
Original logo

KArtu presented itself as "an alternative to the dominant, purely right-wing politics and doctrine of neoliberal capitalism". It supports shortening the work week, first to 32 hours and later to 28 hours, encouraging the expansion of trade unions, progressive taxes on corporations, businesses and high-income landlords, reducing food prices, regulating the housing market by setting rent caps, and expanding women's rights and LGBT rights in Lithuania. It promoted the creation of economic democracy by promoting worker cooperatives instead of private ownership.

It supports Lithuania's membership in NATO and the European Union, and the strengthening of national defense. On top of that, it supports Ukraine in the Russo-Ukrainian War and, alongside the Trade Union "May 1st", agitated for debt forgiveness to Ukraine, as well as harsher sanctions and support to the labor movement in Ukraine. It condemned Israel's actions against Palestinians and supports a two-state solution based on the 1967 borders.
