= Tibor Pál =

Tibor Pál may refer to:

- Tibor Pál (footballer)
- Tibor Pál (politician)
