= Democracy and Solidarity Party =

Romanian political party

Democracy and Solidarity Party Partidul Democrației și Solidarității
- Abbreviation: Demos; DEMOSF
- General Secretary: Ionuț Tudor
- Spokesperson: Nona Șerbănescu; Claudiu Crăciun
- Founded: 1 September 2018
- Headquarters: Stelea Spătarul nr 13, Sector 3, Bucharest
- Membership (2018): 800
- Ideology: Democratic socialism; Progressivism; Left-wing populism; Pro-Europeanism
- Political position: Centre-left to left-wing
- National affiliation: Platform for Democracy, Prosperity, and Progress
- European affiliation: Central-Eastern European Green Left Alliance

Website
- demos.org.ro

The Democracy and Solidarity Party (Romanian: Partidul Democrației și Solidarității), also known by its abbreviation and short name Demos, is a political party of Romania. It was founded in 2018 (with roots going back to 2015), and holds a left-wing position.

== History ==
The Democracy and Solidarity Party has its origins in the autumn of 2015 according to the party's website, which claims that Demos arose "in response to the need to organize the progressive forces, articulating a strong critique of the underdevelopment, inequality and division of the Romanian society". A manifesto published on 15 September 2016 formally created the political party. It was officially registered as such on 1 September 2018.

In the 2019 European elections, the party had initially planned to send 21 candidates, but only 16 showed up. As a result, the party used intra-party deliberation to select a final shortlist of 12 candidates. This process is thought to have improved the presence of women and ethnic minorities.

On 12 January 2024, DEMOS — alongside Budoucnost of the Czech Republic, the Spark Movement of Hungary, KArtu of Lithuania, Razem of Poland, and the Social Movement of Ukraine — co-founded the Central-Eastern European Green Left Alliance. On 24 September 2024, DEMOS, NOW and REPER announced an electoral alliance to contest the 2024 Romanian legislative election, the Platform for Democracy, Prosperity, and Progress.

== Ideology ==
Demos declares itself as a left-wing party. It promotes elements such as equal opportunity and poverty reduction and condemns the injustice and the economic and social inequality that it claims to be present in the Romanian society.

The party was critical towards other parties that governed Romania following the Romanian Revolution, most notably the Social Democratic Party (PSD) and National Liberal Party (PNL), which are considered by Demos as responsible for the "enlargement of the economic inequalities and increasing social division" of the country. Demos considers itself the only "real" left-wing party in Romania, opposing the PSD, which Demos members accuse of not being true to the leftist ideology and deem it as "the enemy of the left".

== See also ==
- Politics of Romania
- Health Education Nature Sustainability Party
- Renewing Romania's European Project
- Justice and Respect in Europe for All Party
