= Spark Movement =

Spark Movement Szikra Mozgalom
- Abbreviation: Szikra
- Presidium: Kristóf Kormos; Balázs Nagy; Gergő Nagy; Mira Roskó; Aram Shakkour
- Founded: 14 October 2020
- Preceded by: Free Budapest Forum
- Headquarters: 1086 Budapest, Magdolna utca 5-7.
- Ideology: Anti-establishment; Democratic socialism Progressivism; Left-wing nationalism Left-wing populism Green politics
- Political position: Left-wing
- European affiliation: Central-Eastern European Green Left Alliance
- Colours: Red; Green
- National Assembly: 0 / 199

Website
- www.szikramozgalom.hu

The Spark Movement (Hungarian: Szikra Mozgalom, pronounced [ˈsikrɒ ˈmozɡɒlom], Szikra) is a left-wing political movement in Hungary that was created in 2020 by a group of activists formerly known as the Free Budapest Forum, who helped the campaign of the green and left-wing candidates in the 2019 local elections. Currently, they continue their work as a registered association in order to enforce a decidedly left-wing policy that focuses on representation of workers' interests, preservation of the natural environment, and strengthening of democratic values. In 2022, András Jámbor, a candidate of United for Hungary coalition representing the organization, won the seat in the parliamentary elections, representing Józsefváros and Ferencváros.

== History ==
=== 2019 local elections ===
In 2019, the Free Budapest (Hungarian: Szabad Budapest) was formed by young people from the countryside and the local community living in the capital, supporting the campaigns of four candidates. These included Gergely Karácsony, co-chair of Dialogue, who ran for mayor, András Pikó, a former journalist and activist and candidate for mayor of the VIII district of C8 Civilek Józsefváros, Krisztina Baranyi as candidate for mayor of the IX district, and Balázs Szücs, a Reformed pastor and candidate for the VII district.

In these few months, the most spectacular event of the new organisation was the "Farewell Party for Tarlós" demonstration on the eve of the municipal elections, when they marched with various banners in front of the Budapest City Hall to prepare for the election day. All four candidates won the elections.

=== Formation and the Airbnb campaign ===
Building on its success in the 2019 local elections, the current Spark Movement was founded on 14 October 2020 as an organisation with a long-term strategy.

The organisation has good relations with similar movements in the Central and Eastern European region such as the Polish The Left, the Slovenian The Left and the Croatian We can!.

In the autumn of 2020, Szikra and several other organisations (The City is For All, Street to Flat Association, Táncsics – Radical Left Party, Green Front) started a petition on aHang to put pressure on municipalities to restrict the renting of flats for tourism purposes. They point out that rents have risen to extreme levels in recent years and have become unaffordable for a wide range of city dwellers. The campaign aims to shift what is currently Airbnb housing to the long-term rental market, thereby reducing rental prices and alleviating the housing crisis. They argue that "housing is a fundamental right, not a commodity".

=== Fudan protests ===
In May 2021, the Spark Movement was already preparing for the election campaign of their future candidate, András Jámbor. Since the issues of Fudan University and Student City directly affected Jámbor's district, they organised a demonstration in favour of Student City and against Fudan, which also determined Jámbor's later campaign, and could be seen as its opening.

The right of assembly has been continuously restricted by Fidesz–KDNP since the outbreak of the COVID-19 pandemic. At that time, a government decree of 21 May allowed any outdoor event, including demonstrations, for those with a protection certificate for over 500 people, but below 500 people, no certificate was required. To circumvent this, behind the larger crowd in front, the Spark announced twenty mass events of up to 500 people each, so that anyone in the right group could attend the event at a safe distance from each other. In the end, the event took place with one large crowd and four small groups of under 500 people without immunity cards.

The event took place on 5 June 2020, the first major protest since the beginning of the COVID pandemic. The demonstration went from Heroes' Square, through Andrássy Avenue, to Széchényi István and Kossuth Square, and was attended by more than 10,000 people. András Jámbor, candidate of the Szikra Movement in Józsefváros and Ferencváros, as well as Mayor Gergely Karácsony, Krisztina Baranyi, and representatives of the Student Trade Union and housing organisations spoke in front of the Parliament.

=== Pre-election ===
In 2020, six Hungarian opposition parties agreed to organise a joint primary election next year in preparation for the 2022 parliamentary elections. In March 2021, the Spark Movement announced that it would run a candidate in Budapest's constituency No. 6, former journalist András Jámbor, founder and editor-in-chief of Mérce. At the beginning of the primaries, Hungarian Socialist Party and Dialogue backed András Jámbor, and later LMP politicians also supported his campaign.

The other candidates in the constituency were Dániel Manhalter of Democratic Coalition, Anett Csordás of C8 and Momentum Movement, and Márta Demeter of Jobbik. András Jámbor won the four-man field with 3,626 votes, or 41.6% of the vote.

=== Political positions and the 2022 elections ===
In October 2021, a strike began at the Continental factory in Mako. Expressing their support, members of Szikra and András Jámbor travelled to the company, condemning the government for disenfranchising workers, for not taking action against the inability of trade unions to organise and for ignoring working conditions. According to Jámbor, there have been several examples in recent years of abuse of workers' rights by a company in strategic partnership with the government. The government is throwing money at them, but it does not demand respect for workers' rights, normal wages and working conditions. The Szikra banners read 'If you come to Hungary, you must obey the law'.

In February 2022, Spark Movement took a stand for teachers' movements, including occasional demonstrations and wildcat strikes. They objected to the government's use of the epidemic emergency as an excuse to block teachers' right to strike, and supported the unions who took the government's decree to the Constitutional Court. Szikra supported the teachers' strike fund with 200 000 HUF, and its members participated in the organisation of several teachers' and students' demonstrations.

In the parliamentary elections of 3 April 2022, András Jámbor won Budapest 6th constituency with 48% of the vote against Sára Botond of Fidesz, Dóra Dúró, deputy chair of Our Homeland Movement and Zsuzsanna Döme, co-chair of the Hungarian Two-Tailed Dog Party.

== Organisational structure ==
The Spark Movement is a democratic organisation with a formal and hierarchical structure. It is inspired by the work of Jeremy Corbyn in the UK, Bernie Sanders in the US, Syriza in Greece and Podemos in Spain.

=== Current presidency members ===
Presidency members	Start	End
Nagy Gergő	2022	Incumbent
Jámbor András	2022	Incumbent
Tárkányi Máté	2022	Incumbent
Bereczki Áron	2021	Incumbent

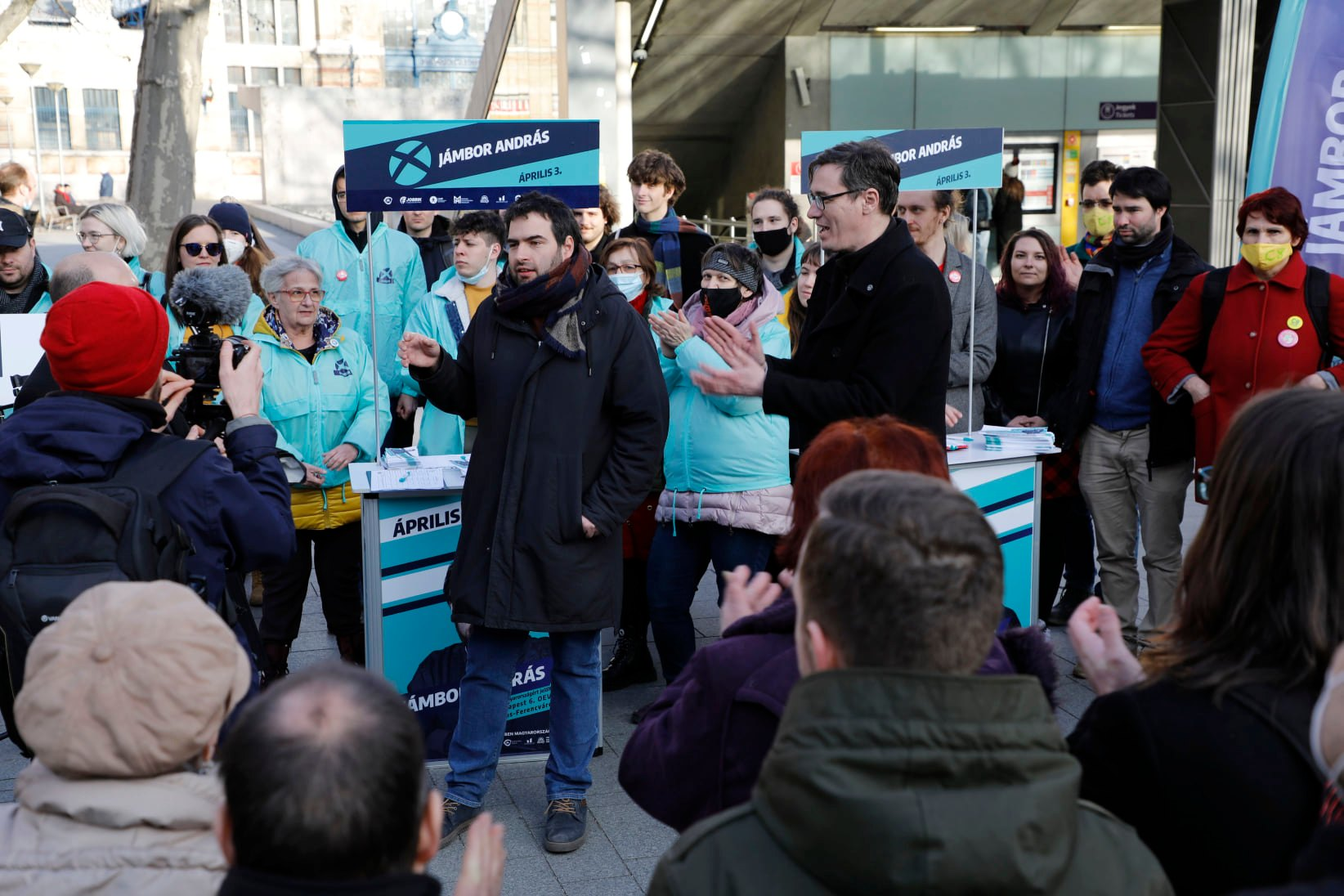
András Jámbor and Szikra to campaign with Gergely Karácsony in February 2022 on Rákóczi Square
