= Gábor Faludi =

Hungarian theatre manager

- Faludi Gábor
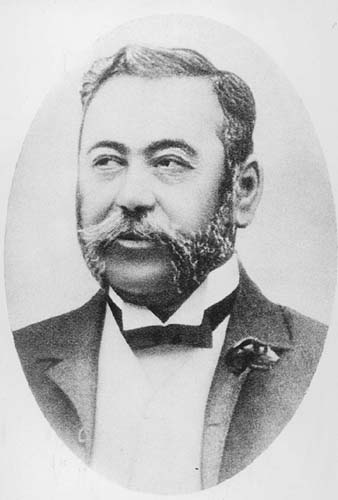
- Faludi Gábor
- Born: Waltersdorf Gábor; May 1, 1846; Tét, Hungary
- Died: May 4, 1932 (aged 86); Budapest, Hungary
- Resting place: Salgótarjáni Road Jewish Cemetery
- Occupations: Theatre owner/manager, businessman
- Spouse: Faludi Josefin
- Children: Miklós, Sándor, Jenő, Hermina
- Writing career
- Years active: 1896–1932

Gábor Faludi (1 May 1846 – 4 May 1932) was a Hungarian theatre manager and businessman. He was the founder and manager of the Comedy Theatre of Budapest (Vígszínház) and an influential figure during the Budapest theatre boom at the beginning of the 20th century.

== Early life ==
Gábor Faludi was born in Tét on 1 May 1846 as Gábor Waltersdorf, according to an entry in the Jewish parish register of Téthszentkút (later known as Téth or Tét). His parents were Salamon Waltersdorf and Rozália (Szali) Klein, both local merchants. His sons Miklós, Jenő, and Sándor later became involved in the family theatre business while his daughter, Hermina, married Jenő Vázsonyi, the President of the Hungarian State Railway. The original family name suggests that the family may have had roots in the Austrian town of Bad Waltersdorf, located about 150 kilometers west of Tét.

Not much is known about Faludi's early life, only that he was a businessman in Devecser until 1878, and in that same year moved to Budapest and developed the first theatre ticket booth system in the country, which he leased out. In 1896, along with Count István Keglevich and the writer Ferenc Szécsi, he founded the Vígszínház and received a considerable stake in the theatre, while at the same time managing the theatre's financial aspects. When Keglevich and Szécsi decided to cut their ties to the theatre after disagreements, Faludi took over full control of managing the theatre. In 1917, he also leased the Városi Színház (Erkel Theatre).

Starting with its founding in 1896, the Vígszínház played an important part in Hungarian theatrical life. In the beginning, it was the novelty of the theatre's plays' styles and the frivolity of its plays that garnered attention. In 1907, the theatre became influential in literary life as it grew to be the home of the contemporary Hungarian modern drama. The theatre slowly came to be regarded as a national cultural establishment. The Vígszínház became the representative symbol of Lipótváros, which was the cultural epicenter and residence of the city's quickly assimilating German and Jewish residents.

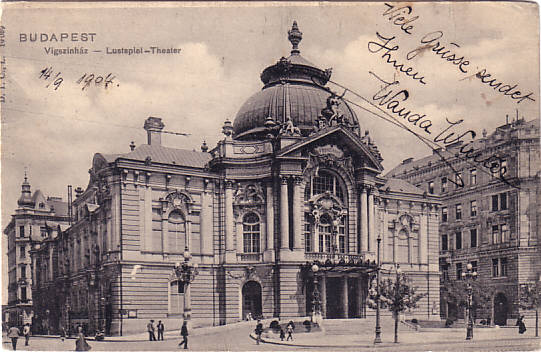
Postcard depicting the Vígszínhaz in 1904

== The Vígszínház in the Early 20th Century ==
By the beginning of the 1910s, the Vígszínház became the concrete cultural institute of the capital. The Vígszínház knowingly worked to change the selection of its shows. In 1911, when the stakeholders of the theatre met, it was made known in no unclear terms that frivolous pieces were only presented for the interest of the common public, but that one of the key factors for the leasing of the theatre in its entirety to the Faludi family would be that they would have to present cultured pieces for the tastes of a cultured public. The repertoire of the theatre began to quickly change, and it started leaning more towards more serious dramatic literature for its shows' basis.

Two things ensured this change. In 1919, the theatre was forced to create a list of all its pieces that it would be presenting in advance, on the orders of the Cultural Ministry of the short-lived Hungarian Soviet Republic. Accordingly, a number of Hungarian dramatic writers worked for the Vígszínház, yet the theatre even geared itself towards presenting works by Flers/Caillavet, Feydeau, Kistemaeckers, Bourdet, Wedekind, Heijermans, Hauptmann, and Strindberg. The second thing signalled even more clearly that the theatre's dramaturgy considered the change in style to be final. During a time when political powers tried to occupy a large place in the workings of cultural institutions, Miklós Faludi asked the state's top attorney Albert Váry whether he could present protégé Géza Fazekas "Randevú" (Rendezvous) titled play with the following words: No matter how certain the low comedy of mischief is, at this point we cannot return to those performances in which the switching of identity, mistaken identity, and the mistress's constant nagging complicate activities. Separate hotel rooms, and the comedic situation of those who mistakenly show up at the wrong room or wind up locked up in the wrong room are very far from the current repertoire of the Vígszínház.

In the first place, the Vígszínház needed to have financial independence in order to develop its own performances as it pleased and tweak them as it liked. The scales of the Vígszínház were profitable and the theatre's management decided to sink their bank loans in better measure as well. Gábor Faludi smartly attempted to spread his ever-increasing funds into various ventures, and his personal tragedy was that while his name amongst the citizenry constantly grew, he decided to push the prosperity of the Vígszínház into the midst of war profiteers. Faludi as a shrewd businessman decided in the last peaceful year to invest his earnings into four percent korona stock investment, which he even placed into a deposit until 1917. Now the lighting war strategy in which they shut down all the theatres, truly endangered the Vígszínház. Faludi immediately took strategic steps to cut his spending, and asked the leasing committee of the theatre for a moderation of the twenty thousand korona rental fee, at the same time decreasing the salary of his actors by sixty percent. Only Gyula Hegedűs dared to object, probably because he had been offered a position at the National Theatre, while the others agreed to part with more than half their normal salaries. The Vígszínház returned to its original rental fee, and working together with the actors debts it managed to balance its financial situation. The quick financial intervention was so urgent because during the first month of the World War they changed the entire scheme of the theatre's repertoire.

The kind of plays that were presented dealt with the situation of the time. A play titled All of us have to leave (A mindnyájunknak el kell menni) co-written by Gyula Hegedűs and Jenő Faragó debuted on 1 September 1914 and cheered up the otherwise melancholy audiences. The last scene was only first performed half a century later, on 18 August 1964, the birthday of Emperor Franz Josef while crowds were viewing the imperial crowns of Serbia and Russia in the Hungarian National Museum at a memorial exhibition about the "victorious war". The financial strain was all the more apparent when looking at the theatre, because the war hysteria prevented the theatre from featuring any works by enemy countries on its stage. This created a renewed drive for Hungarian dramatists, but the theatre continued to feature French works in secret. Only the translators names were featured on the playbill, but everyone tacitly agreed to this solution.

The First World War brought decisive changes to the Vígszínház in other aspects too. New crowds began to show up in the audience: war profiteers. The Vígszínház's shareholder management made the following observations about the Vígszínház's audience at their annual shareholder meeting in 1916: "As soon as the Carpathian battles of 1915 achieved victorious results in the spring of the same year – the audience's new members – which the Vígszínház cannot exclusively claim to be its own, appeared to be relieved and it was as if they wanted to recoup, beginning to visit the theatre again." Gyula Hegedűs recalled the new public in this way: "the face of the theatre's viewership has changed. Again, it is filled with flashy, loud folks. Again, they arrive late, and again they cough often and loudly. This newly enriched layer of society had never seen the boom created by the Vígszínház. In fact, by 1917 the commentators were talking about the fact that at a premiere every now and then the atmosphere of the old, warm nights had returned and that the regular audience of the Vígszínház aussaged their pressures of the war with the pleasures of the arts.

The advance purchase of tickets became general habit at the theatre, since tickets could not be purchased at the ticket booth for same-day showings. The summer breaks also shrivelled up, and performances were also done on Saturday afternoons. In 1916, many performances were made at Tisza Kálmán Square, the National Opera, at the Urania premises, in the neighbourhood of the National Theatre, and folk stories were performed on Rákóczi Road. This ambition was fulfilled when Gábor Faludi leased the National Opera's empty premises, and created a company independent of the Vígszínház with the name of the Városi Szinház (City Theatre). He transferred the Vígszínház's biggest operette successes (Három a kislány, Médi) here, to the repertoire of the theatre with Budapest's largest audience capacity. Various information attests to the nature of the Vígszínház as an extremely successful, complimentary business for Gábor Faludi, providing prosperous positions and a solid future for his family members. Sándor Hunyady, when speaking about the 1910s, described the theatre's financial situation in the following manner: "the business is in such strong form, and is infected with such life, that it is like a small Italian renaissance republic. In these times there was many a year in which they closed with 250,000 gold crowns of pure profit. It was a common occurrence that every season from September to February the theatre made up for all of its annual expenditures, and after that every ticket sold was surplus, pure profit. There is no need to be frugal, the financial office gives advances without keeping count, and pays the incredible bills of the Miksa Schmidt furniture company without any fuss".

In Nándor Kozma's book Hadimilliomosok (War Profiteers), he tried numbers for exact proceeds. According to his sources, which he did not publish, the annual profit of the theatre was 234,000 crowns. Thanks to the profit the shareholders during the war were also entitled to their part: for each share, 8 crowns were given. With this, Gábor Faludi who had more than 500 shares, was entitled to more than 4000 crowns while the minority shareholders' earnings were not that considerable. There is nothing surprising about the fact that, unable to see into the future through the fog of war, Gábor Faludi wanted to leave nothing to chance. In 1918 he thought that he was still acting in time when as the head of the Faludi family and the boss of the Vígszínház's leasing management, he extended his contract with the Vígszínház's shareholder association – due to his superiority over the shareholders, practically speaking with himself – all the way until 1943. The events between these years upset his calculations very much, however.

With the loss of the First World War, the economic meltdown, and the Treaty of Trianon, it was apparently a minor event in comparison when the theatre's financial backers and patrons, the Faludi family, were forced to withdraw and sell the theatre to an American owner. The extreme-right wing political powers' immediate disagreement over this transaction is understandable, since they feared new danger due to this cosmopolitan landmark's change of hands. They did not make their anger heard only in newspaper articles, but they also planned illegal actions with the aim to breach the peace and scare the crowds out of the theatre. The minor terrorist activities did not yet immediately endanger the lives of citizens, but the explosion of a stink bomb scared the well-dressed, unprotected crowds into the streets.

With the act of the selling of the Vígszínház, everyone had the instinctive feeling that a new era had begun. The bourgeoisie, powerful illusions of the Hungarian ideal altogether vanished. The change of ownership made it clear that the theatre had become a full-fledged business venture once and for all. The new American owner Ben Blumenthal and his colleagues were only interested in the theatre's bookkeeping information. He did not support the Vígszínház anymore and it became a product of the state's change; only the annual profit of the theatre determined its value. With this act the theatre also withdrew its place in local theatre life, thereby beginning to act as Hungary's representative in the sphere of the international theatrical world. However even with this international connection there still was not a considerable amount of artistic achievement. In its shows it became apparent that the success of contemporary Western European and American theatre still could not create any visible breakthrough. Those performers with which the theatre's management wanted to evoke the Vígszínház of old for itself and before its audience remained powerless to do anything.

Naturally there was also an advantage of the American funds. The Vígszínház had the ability to stay afloat in the most hopeless of circumstances. It expanded when the opportunity presented itself (a kamara theatre was established in 1935 with the name Pesti Színház in Révay Street), and with quick decision-making removed those plays from its repertoire, which it had paid for. It created its regular patrons from the best powers. It was crucial for the theatre that stars stepped onto its stage. They strove to secure each cue with more actors. They paid such high salaries that not a single theatre could compete with them. Many theatre managers complained that the Vígszínház did not even loan its members to other theatres for guest performances, but preferred to pay their salaries, just to ensure that they would not create success for the competition. During the First World War, Gábor Faludi invested the theatre's earnings into war loans. Naturally if the daily earnings were positive, it would be worth it to keep the original version of the theatre. Faludi, like his rival László Beöthy, first thought about the expansion of the theatre; he attempted to gain possession of a building at 22–24 Nagymező Street that had been intended to house the Télikert entertainment theatre, and it is possible that Faludi decided to sell his stake in the Vígszínház just due to the failure of this bid. In the Színházi Élet (Theatrical Life) Almanac the events were recorded as such: on 10 October 1920 Ben Blumenthal acquired the theatre. On 15 October Dániel Jób became the new artistic director of the theatre. Faludi also developed the Vígszínház pension fund. Faludi died in Budapest on 4 May 1932.
