= Auróra =

- Purpose: community center, cultural space
- Headquarters: Budapest, Hungary

Auróra is a cultural and community place located in the 8th district of Budapest, Hungary. A well-known site of the city's underground music and art scene, it also serves as a hub for Hungarian NGOs. Its organisational model is based on participative democracy. Auróra has been a well-known target for the Hungarian government's crackdown on civil organisations. It has been named after Károly Kisfaludy's literary journal of the same name.

== Civil hub ==
Auróra's first floor provides office space for several Hungarian non-governmental organisations. Currently the following NGOs have their headquarters in the building:

- Alternatíva Alapítvány (Altalap)
- Közélet Iskolája
- atlatszo.hu (investigative newspaper)
- Marom Egyesület
- Utcajogász
- Pneuma Szöv. (Közmű Egyesület - Mókus csoport)
- Roma Sajtóközpont (RSK)
- Budapest Pride (Szivárvány Misszió Alapítvány)
