= Károly Kisfaludy =

Hungarian writer (1788–1830)

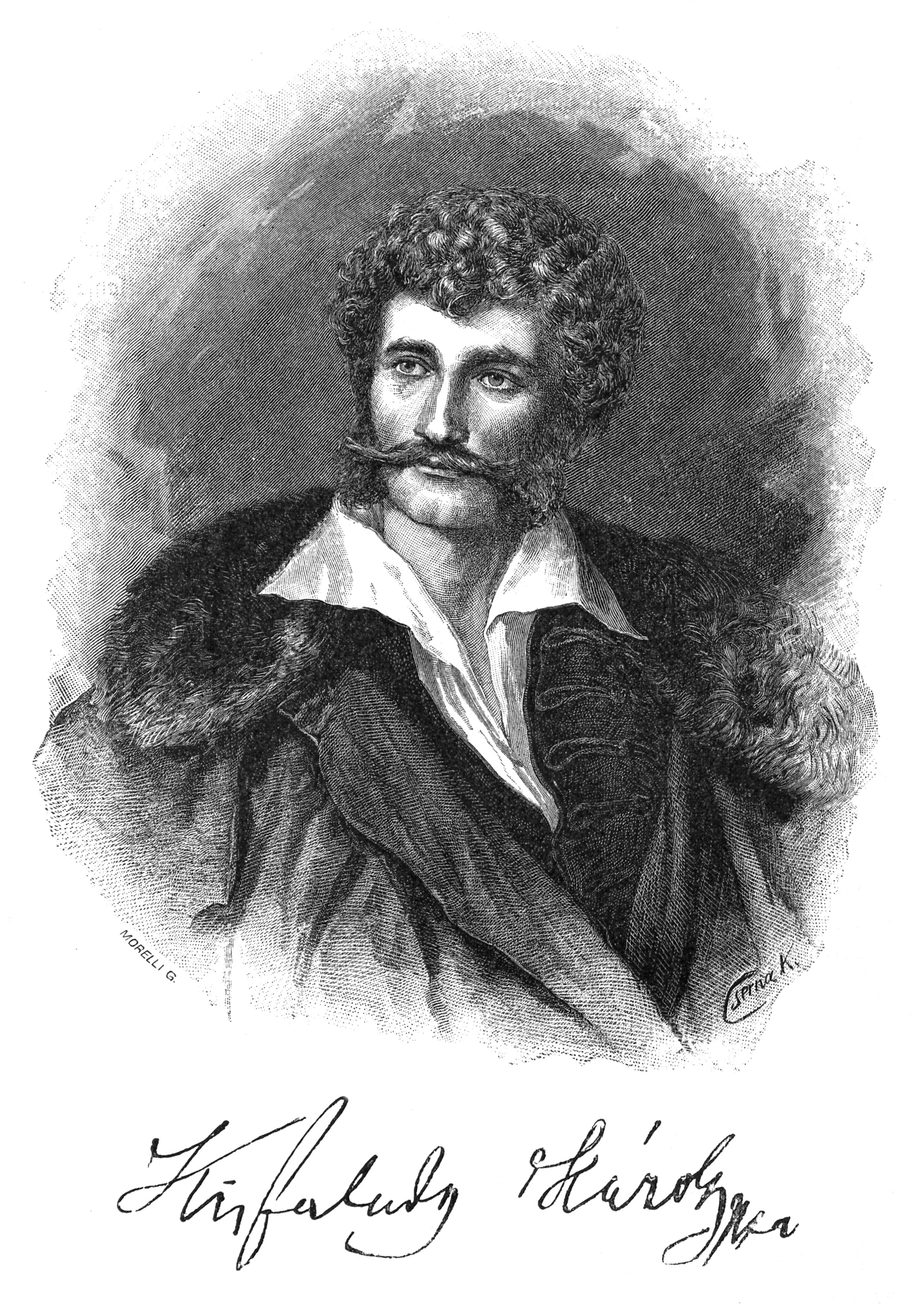
- Born: 5 February 1788; Tét, Hungary
- Died: 21 November 1830 (aged 42); Pest, Hungary
- Occupation: Artist

Károly Kisfaludy (5 February 1788 – 21 November 1830) was a Hungarian dramatist and artist, brother of Sándor Kisfaludy. He was the founder of the national drama.

== Early life ==
The youngest of eight children, his mother died in childbirth, and he had a troubled relationship with his father. Kisfaludy began writing poems and songs while in the army from 1804 to 1811. He saw active service in the Napoleonic Wars in Italy, Serbia and Bavaria. After his return in 1810 he courted a girl named Katalin Heppler, but did not marry. His resignation from the army alienated his father, and he took refuge at his sister Teréz's house in Vas County.

== Education ==
He studied art, travelling to Vienna in 1812 and Italy in 1815, but had no luck with either writing or painting until April and June 1819, when his tragedies A tatárok Magyarországon ("The Tatars in Hungary") and Ilka, vagy Nándorfehérvár bevétele ("Ilka, or the Capture of Belgrade") were a great success. He followed them up immediately with other dramas he had written: Stibor vajda ("The Voivode Stiber") and A kérők ("The Suitors"), in September, and A pártütők ("The Insurgents") in November; and the next year wrote three more. His plays were translated into German, and performed in Vienna.

== Personal life ==
In 1822, he founded the periodical Aurora, for which he was awarded the Marczibányi Prize in 1826, the same year that his father reinstated him in his will. He fell in love with a woman named Nina Löffler, but because she was Jewish he could not marry her. He wrote prolifically for Aurora until his death from tuberculosis in 1830. The Kisfaludy Society was created in his honour in 1836.

He is remembered for his plays and epigrams, and for poems like his elegy Mohács (1824), on the subject of the battle of 1526. His life was fictionalised by Mór Jókai in Eppur si muove (1872).
