= Miklós Faludi =

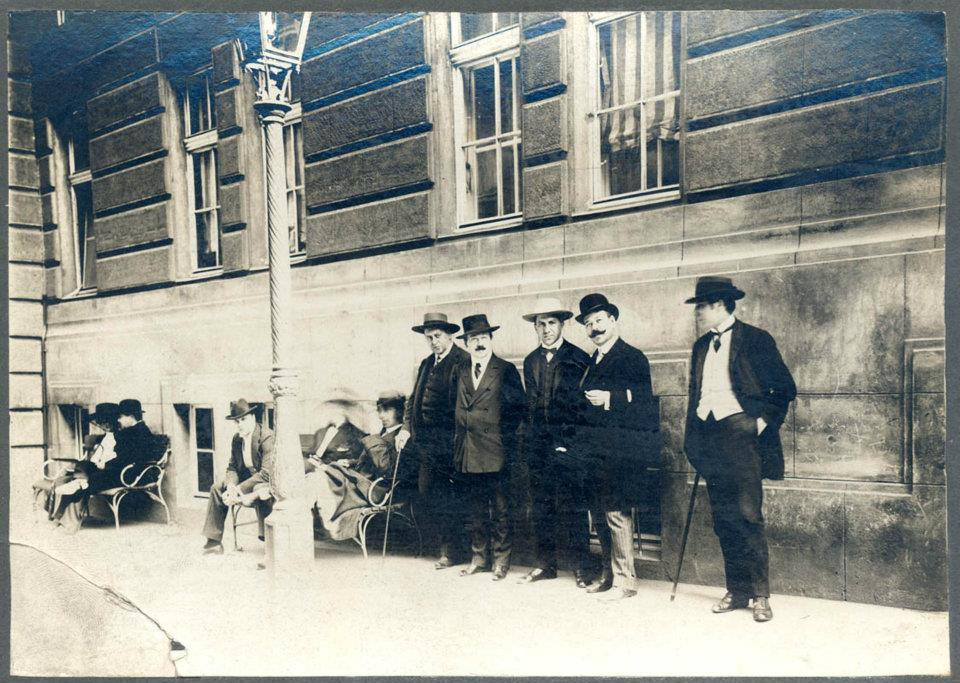
In front of the Vígszínház. Standing (left to right): Jenő Heltai, Jenő Faludi, Nándor Erényi and Miklós Faludi. Budapest, 1905.

Miklós Faludi (3 February 1870 – 1 February 1942) was the artistic director of the Comedy Theatre of Budapest and the founder of the Hunnia Biograph Company through which he financed and oversaw the development of the first purpose-built film studio in Hungary.

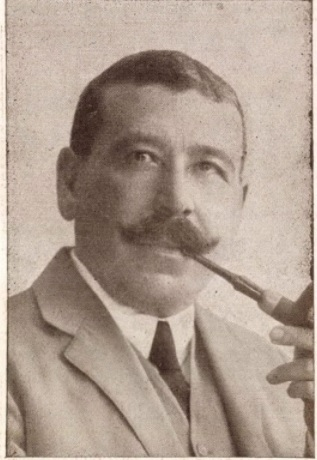
Miklós Faludi Actor

== Biography ==
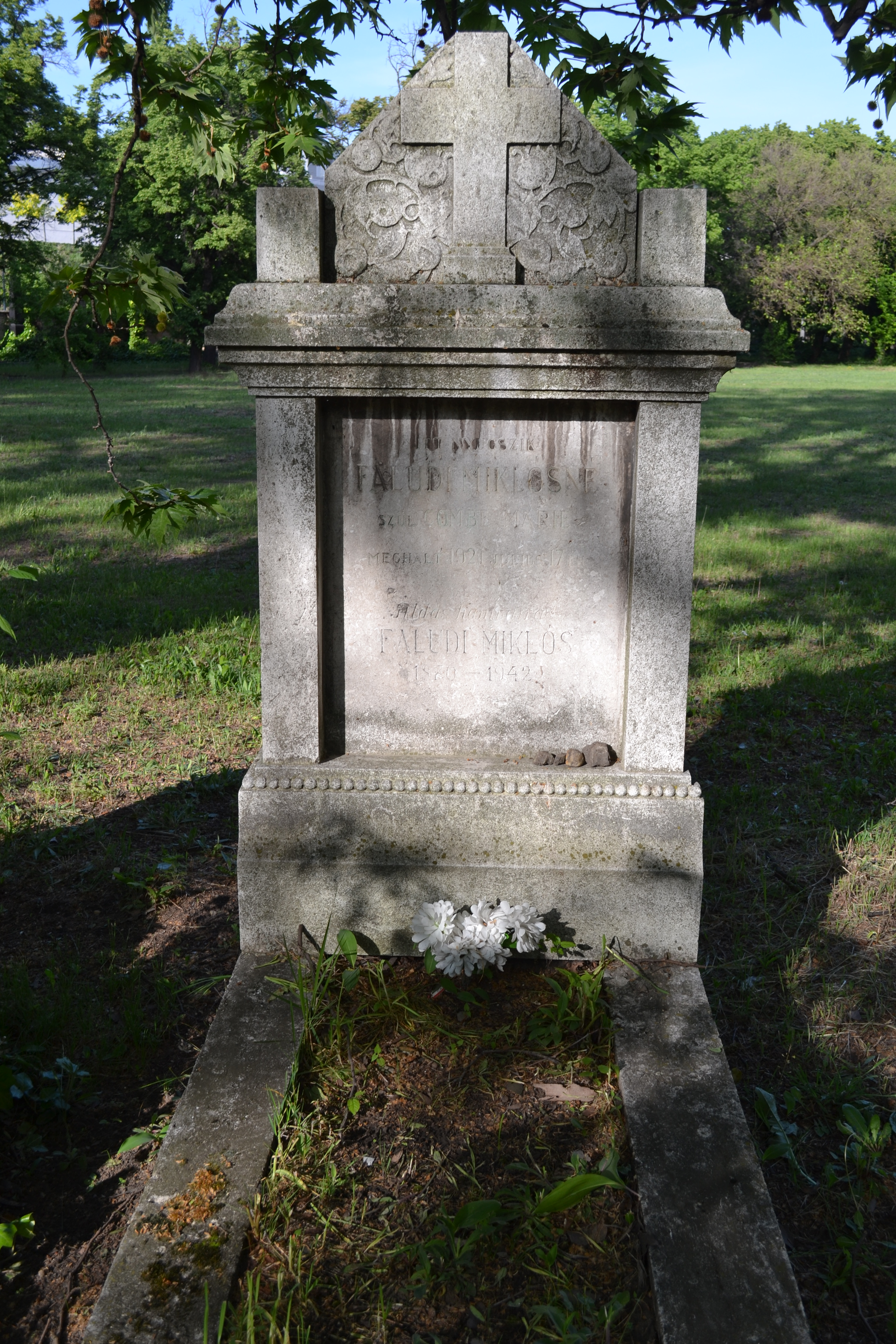
Tombstone of theatre manager Miklós Faludi (1870-1942) and his wife Marie Combe (1868-1921) at Kerepesi Cemetery in Budapest

Miklós Faludi was born Miklós Mózes Waltersdorf in Devecser, Hungary, on 3 February 1870. His parents were Gábor Faludi, a successful businessman who founded the famous Comedy Theatre of Budapest in 1896, and Josefin Lővy. After completing his secondary school studies, Miklós worked as a bank clerk in London, England after which he moved to France, where he met his wife Marie Combe. In 1896 he returned to Budapest and became the secretary of the Népszínház (Folk Theatre).

In 1901, he joined his father Gábor and brothers Jenő and Sándor in the management of the Comedy Theatre as the artistic director and dramaturge, a role which he would retain until 1921. Faludi's experiences in Western Europe as a young man, along with his ability to speak English, French, and German, allowed him to translate and stage popular plays from across the continent including David Belasco's Madame Butterfly.

In 1911, Faludi founded the Hunnia Biograph Company and personally oversaw the construction of the first film studio in Budapest, located in Pannonia Street. The company produced a number of films until it ceased operations in 1913. In his later years, he worked as an artistic director at the Belvárosi Theatre until his retirement in 1939. Faludi died in Budapest on 1 February 1942 and was buried at Kerepesi Cemetery.
