= Tét =

- Town
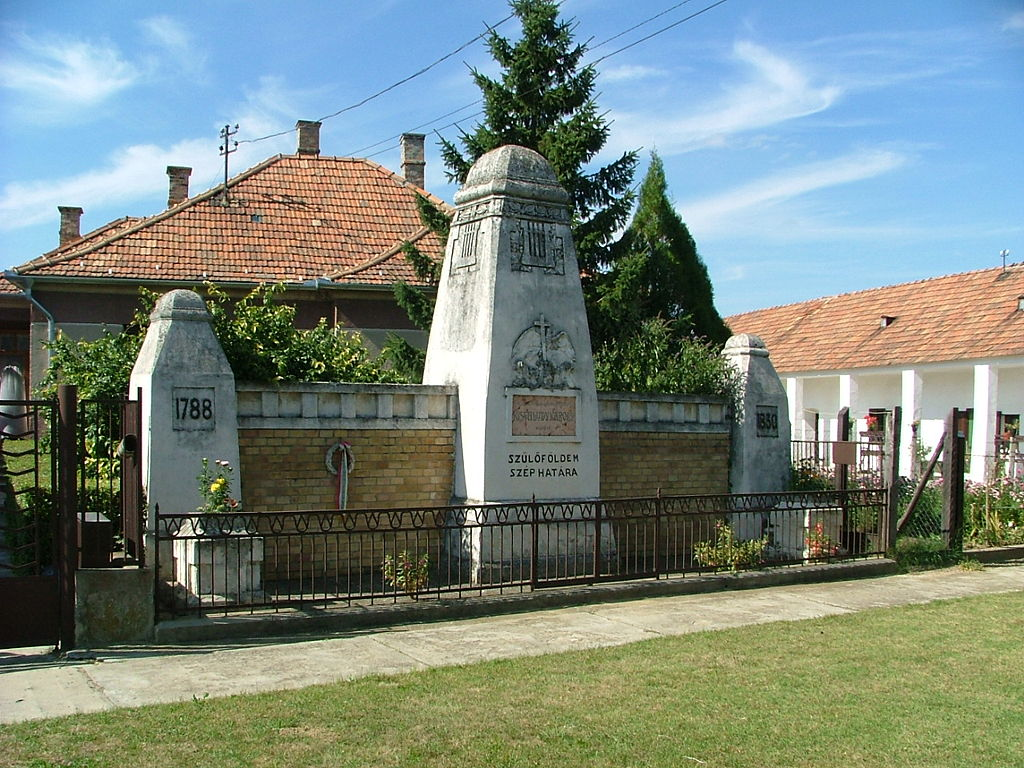
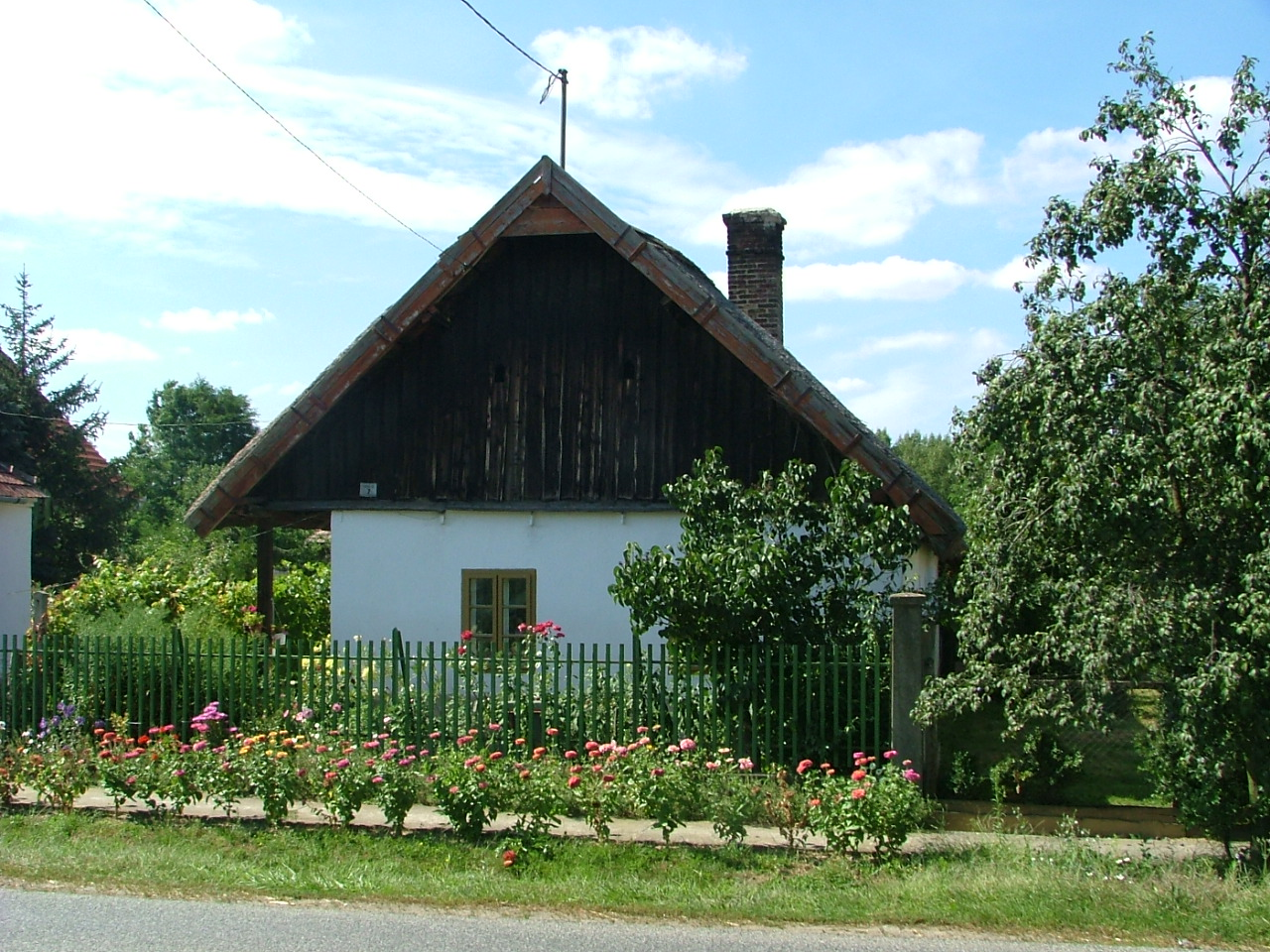
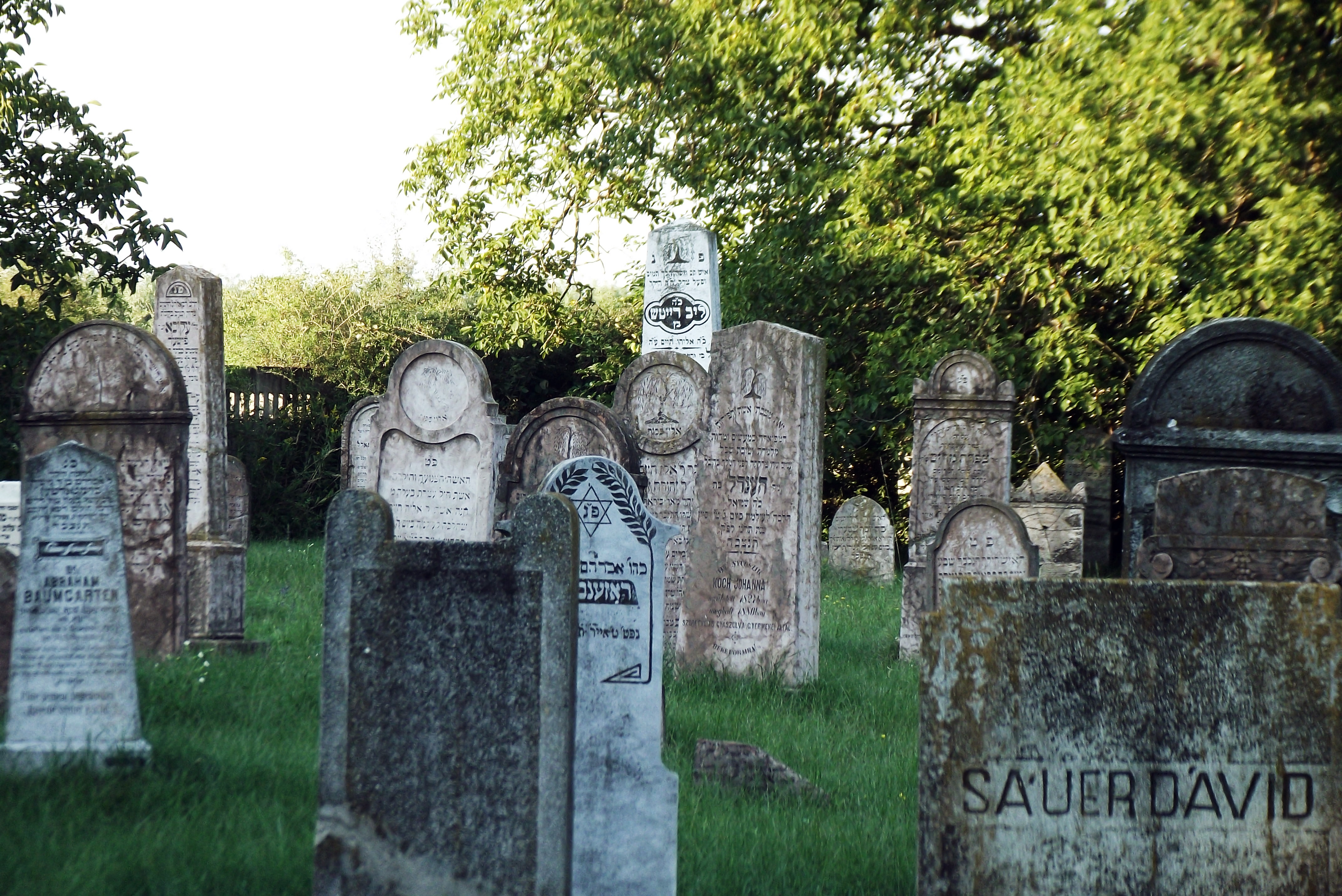
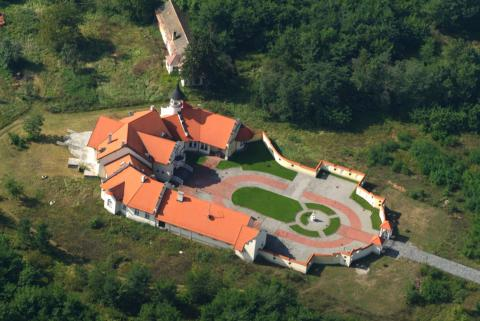
- View of Tét, Kisfaludy memorial, Old house in Tétszentkút, Jewish cemetery, Aerial view of the castle

- Flag Coat of arms

- Location of Tét
- Coordinates: 47.5167°N 17.5167°E
- Country: Hungary
- County: Győr-Moson-Sopron
- District: Tét

Area
  - Total: 56.35 km^{2} (21.76 sq mi)

Population (2015)
  - Total: 4,020
  - Density: 71.3/km^{2} (185/sq mi)
- Time zone: UTC+1 (CET)
  - Summer (DST): UTC+2 (CEST)
- Postal code: 9100
- Area code: (+36) 96
- Website: www.tet.hu

Tét (German: Tietzing) is a town in Győr-Moson-Sopron county, Hungary. It is located between the town of Pápa (21 km north) and the city of Győr (24 km south) in the Little Hungarian Plain. According to 1990 census it used to have 4,252 inhabitants, nearly all of them Hungarian by ethnicity. Neighbouring settlements are: Rábaszentmihály, Kisbabot, Rábaszentmiklós, Mórichida, Gyömöre, Felpéc, Győrszemere and the city of Győr.

== History ==
In 1910 Tét was a village in the Sokoróalja district of the Győr County with 4,111 inhabitants. In terms of religion: 1,935 citizens (47,1%) were Lutheran, 1,890 (46,0%) Roman Catholic, 432 (10,5%) Jewish and 52 (1,3%) others. Tét population grew steadily in the interwar period. Notably, the Jews of Tét were forced into a transit ghetto and then sent aboard Holocaust trains to the Auschwitz concentration camp during the Holocaust. They are featured in the Auschwitz Album, the only surviving pictorial evidence of the extermination process from inside Birkenau.

Tét received town rights (Város) in 2001. Current population is estimated at 4,104 inhabitants.

== Notable people ==
- Károly Kisfaludy (1788–1830) a Hungarian dramatist and artist.
- Gábor Faludi (1846–1932) a theatre manager in Budapest

== Gallery ==
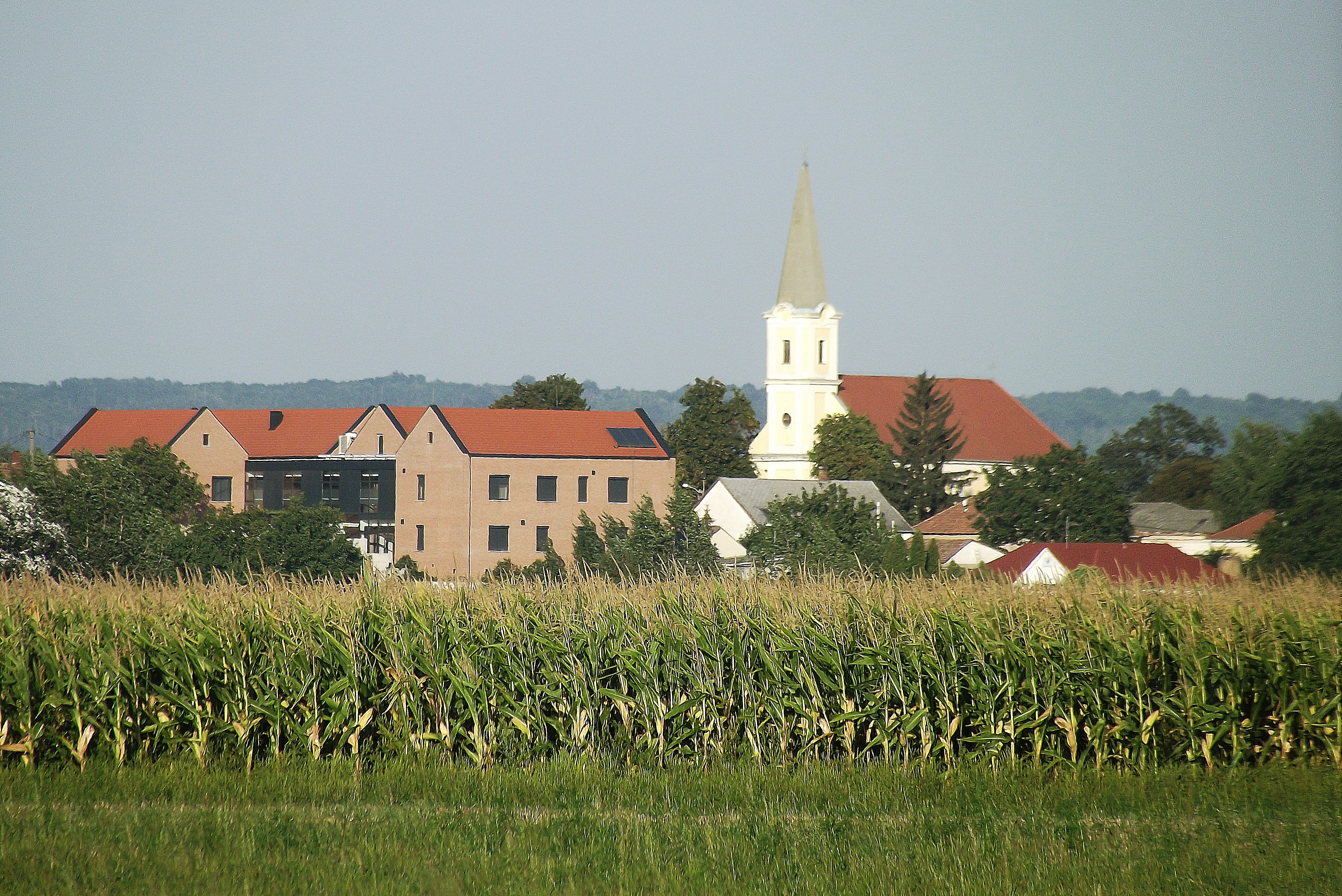
View of the centre of town from across the fields
