= Aurora (literary journal) =

1821 journal by Károly Kisfaludy

Aurora was a literary journal founded by Károly Kisfaludy in 1821. It was crucial in the development of Romanticism in Hungarian literature, and in establishing Pest as a literary centre. The magazine adopted a progressive literary approach.

== History ==
Kisfaludy began collecting contributions in 1820, but it was not until the autumn of 1821 that the first issue appeared (bearing the date 1822). He himself wrote prolifically for his own magazine: short stories, poems, and folk songs. It began as an annual but by its end it was appearing at six-month intervals. Its circulation was approximately 1000.

Hungarian writers who travelled abroad to cultivate links with German and English literati could point to Aurora as evidence of the existence of a new and vital literary culture which would transcend the neoclassicism of elder figures like Ferenc Kazinczy. Béla Bartók also published articles on music in the magazine.

Upon Kisfaludy's death in 1830, József Bajza took over the magazine. A dispute with the printer led in 1834 to the brief appearance of a rival version of the magazine with a different editor.

Censorship took its toll on Aurora, and in 1837 the magazine ceased publication. Its social role was taken by a new magazine, the Athenaeum (1837–43), edited by Bajza and Vörösmarty and appearing twice or thrice a week.

The main members of the Aurora circle were Károly Kisfaludy, József Bajza, Ferenc Toldy, and Mihály Vörösmarty. The circle's influence was limited in the 1840s and after the failure of the Hungarian Revolution of 1848 they ceased to be literary leaders in Hungary.

== Later uses ==
A literary journal of the same name was published in Budapest from 1919 to 1923. Its editor was Sándor Giesswein. The Budapest community place Auróra was named after the journal.
