= Tibor Pál (politician) =

20th and 21st-century Hungarian politician

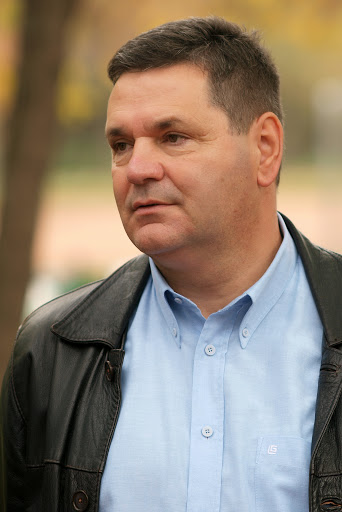

Member of the National Assembly
- In office 15 May 2002 – 5 May 2014

Personal details
- Born: 1959 (age 66–67) Budapest, Hungary
- Party: MSZP
- Other political affiliations: KISZ
- Profession: politician

Tibor Pál (born 1959) is a Hungarian politician, who was a Member of Parliament from 2002 to 2014. He represented Pesterzsébet (Budapest Constituency XIII) from 2002 to 2010. He was elected MP via the Hungarian Socialist Party's Budapest Regional List in the 2014 parliamentary election.

== Early life ==
Pál was born in 1959 in Budapest. He lived in Pesterzsébet then Ferencváros (9th district). He finished elementary studies in 1973. He obtained a qualification of mechanic in 1976. He lived in Moscow with his family between 1976 and 1980. He took his high school leaving exam there in 1978. He started his work as a tour guide and interpreter. Returning Hungary, he was a legal rapporteur for the Budapest Liqueur Industry Company from 1980 to 1986, while also entered one-and-a-half-year compulsory military service in 1981. He also involved in the family grocery store since 1983. He joined the Hungarian Young Communist League (KISZ) in 1986, and was an employee of its Ferencváros executive committee until 1988. He attended the ruling party-affiliated Political College (PF) since that year until its abolition in 1990. He continued his sociology and political science studies at the Eötvös Loránd University after the end of communism in Hungary. He earned a degree of social politics there in 1995.

== Political career ==
As a member of the Hungarian Young Communist League, he was elected as a councilor to the local council of Ferencváros in 1985, holding the office until 1990. Maintaining his position after the fall of the Communist regime, he became a member of the local representative body of Ferencváros in 1990, holding the position until 2019. He is a member of the Hungarian Socialist Party, the legal successor of the ruling Hungarian Socialist Workers' Party (MSZMP). He served as deputy mayor of Ferencváros from 1998 to 2002 and from 2006 to 2010. He was his party's candidate for the position of mayor of Ferencváros during the 2010 local elections, but was defeated by János Bácskai (Fidesz) and came to the third place after Bácskai and incumbent mayor Ferenc Gegesy.

Pál was elected a Member of Parliament for Pesterzsébet during the 2002 parliamentary election. He served as Secretary of State for Internal Affairs under minister Mónika Lamperth in the cabinet of Péter Medgyessy from 27 May 2002 to 3 October 2004. Thereafter he was a member of the Parliamentary Committee of Local Government and Law Enforcement Committee between 2004 and 2006. During the 2006 parliamentary election, he was re-elected MP for Pesterzsébet. He worked in the Municipal and Regional Development Committee from 2006 to 2014. He was elected MP via the Socialist Party's Budapest Regional List in the 2010 parliamentary election. He ran for seat in Budapest constituency VI during the 2014 parliamentary election, but was defeated by Fidesz politician Imre Vas.
