= Hunnia Studio =

Early film studio of Budapest, Hungary

The Hunnia Studio was the first Hungarian purpose-built film studio. Located in the capital Budapest it was built between September 1911 and February 1912. Its founder was the theatre director Miklós Faludi of the Comedy Theatre of Budapest, who wished to enter the growing film industry. The initial building had a glass roof as was common at the time, to enable films to be shot in natural light.

The studio struggled to gain sufficient business and closed after a year. It shares its name with a later and more successful studio Hunnia Film Studio.

== Bibliography ==
- Cunningham, John. Hungarian Cinema: From Coffee House to Multiplex. Wallflower Press, 2004.
