= Béla Csécsei =

Hungarian politician (1952–2012)

Mayor of Józsefváros District VIII, Budapest
- In office 2 February 1993 – 2 September 2009
- Preceded by: Zoltán Koppány
- Succeeded by: Máté Kocsis

Personal details
- Born: 12 October 1952 Budapest, Hungary
- Died: 31 December 2012 (aged 60) Budapest, Hungary
- Party: SZDSZ (1989–2009)
- Profession: educator, politician

Béla Csécsei (12 October 1952 – 31 December 2012) was a Hungarian educator and politician, who served as Mayor of Józsefváros (8th district of Budapest) from 2 February 1993 to 2 September 2009.

Political offices
Preceded by Zoltán Koppány	Mayor of Józsefváros; 1993–2009	Succeeded by Máté Kocsis
