= Imre Vas =

Hungarian jurist and politician

Member of the National Assembly
- In office 14 May 2010 – 7 May 2018

Personal details
- Born: 17 January 1966 (age 60) Budapest, Hungary
- Party: Fidesz (since 2003)
- Profession: jurist, politician

Dr. Imre Vas (born January 17, 1966) is a Hungarian jurist and politician, member of the National Assembly (MP) for Pesterzsébet (Budapest Constituency XIII) from 2010 to 2014, and for Józsefváros (Budapest Constituency VI) from 2014 to 2018. He was also appointed a vice mayor of Pesterzsébet (District XX, Budapest) in 2011, holding the position until 2014.

Vas was replaced as MP for Józsefváros by fellow Fidesz politician Máté Kocsis in the 2018 parliamentary election.

He was a member of the Committee on Constitutional Affairs, Justice and Home Affairs from 2010 to 2014, Constitutional Preparatory Ad Hoc Committee from 2010 to 2011, Committee on Youth, Social, Family, and Housing Affairs from 2011 to 2013, Defense and Law Enforcement Committee from 2013 to 2014, Legislative Committee from 2014 to 2018, Defense and Law Enforcement Committee from 2014 to 2018 and Committee on Legal Affairs from 2014 to 2018 (vice-chairman since 2015).
