= Aid to Ukraine during the Russo-Ukrainian war =

Aid to Ukraine during the Russo-Ukrainian War may refer to:

- List of humanitarian aid to Ukraine during the Russo-Ukrainian war
- List of military aid to Ukraine during the Russo-Ukrainian war
