= Attila Ara-Kovács =

Hungarian philosopher, politician, journalist

Attila Ara-Kovács MEP

Member of the European Parliament
- In office 2 July 2019 – 15 July 2024
- Constituency: Hungary

Personal details
- Born: 14 January 1953 (age 73) Oradea, Romania
- Party: Democratic Coalition (2014–2026)
- Education: Babeș-Bolyai University

Attila Ara-Kovács (born 14 January 1953) is a Hungarian politician, philosopher and journalist. He was nominated to the fourth place in the Democratic Coalition's European Parliament list. Subsequently, he was elected a Member of the European Parliament for Hungary in the 2019 election.
