= Rákóczi Square Market Hall =

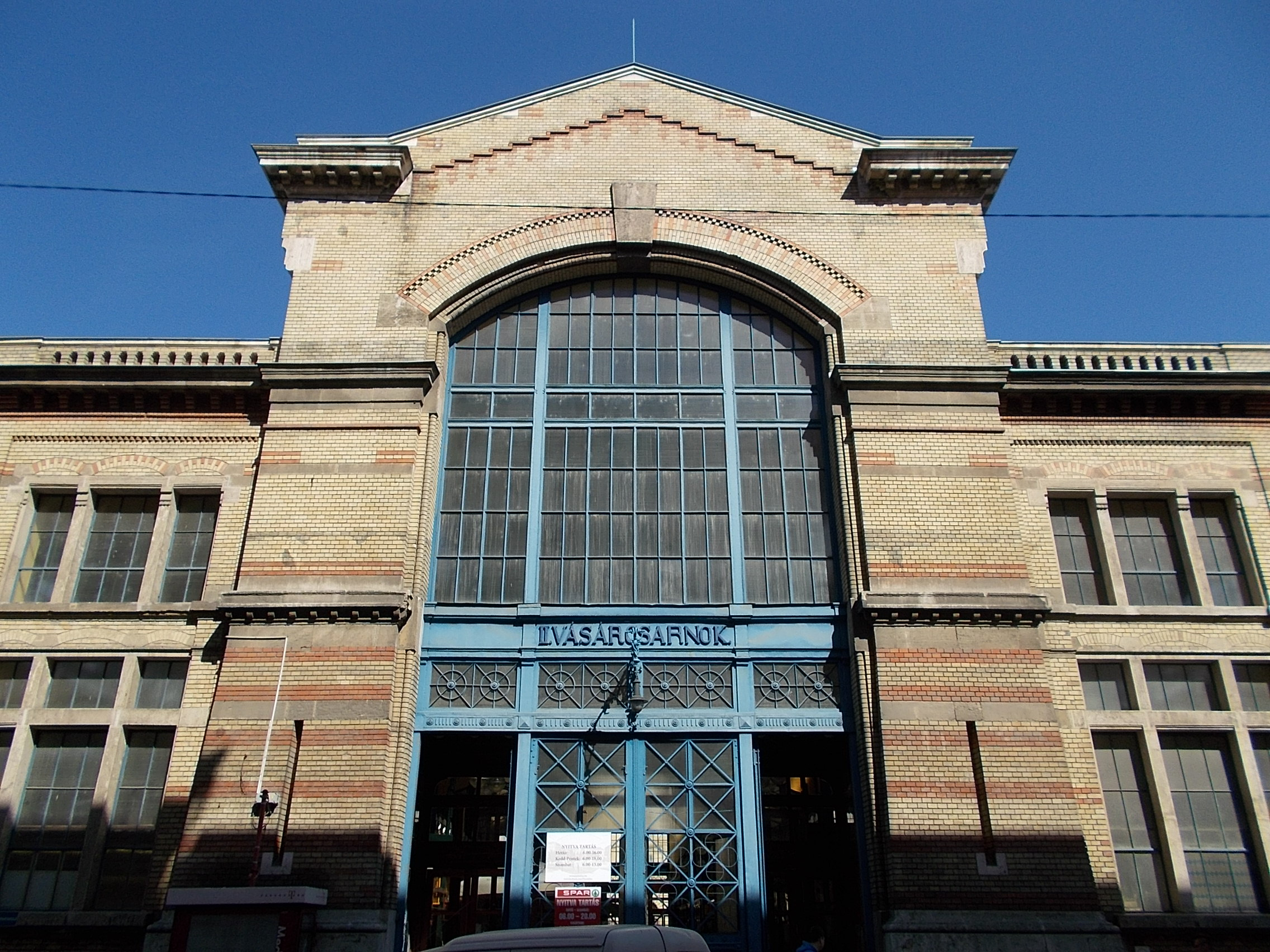

The Rákóczi Square Market Hall or Market Hall II is one of the great Budapest market halls built during the monarchy. It was originally opened in 1894 and has been operating in its present form since 1991. This institution was named after the new district of Józsefváros in 2012, the Hall quarter.

The Rákóczi tér market hall was the second of the large Budapest market halls built in the VIII. In 1890, Győző Czigler made a proposal for its replacement. [1] It was built in 1894 and designed by István Rozinay and Pál Klunzinger. The hall opened to customers in 1897.

In the post-delivery period, a horse-drawn carriage could be driven into the hall at the main entrance from Rákóczi Square, thus facilitating unloading. Inside the hall there were 4 and 6 m^{2} storehouses, with a total of 375 permanent and 55 temporary stores. The cellar was used for storage, while the corner pavilions housed a shopkeeper, police, hall control, first aid and restaurants. Above them were rented apartments.

By 1936, the traffic in the hall had become so low that it was planned to close it or transform it into a swimming pool, but these plans were not realized later. On the night of May 6, 1988, a fire broke out in the hall and the building burned down. The market hall was not demolished, but it was renovated according to the plans of the architects György Tokár and György Hidasi, and reopened on 25 July 1991.

== Gallery ==
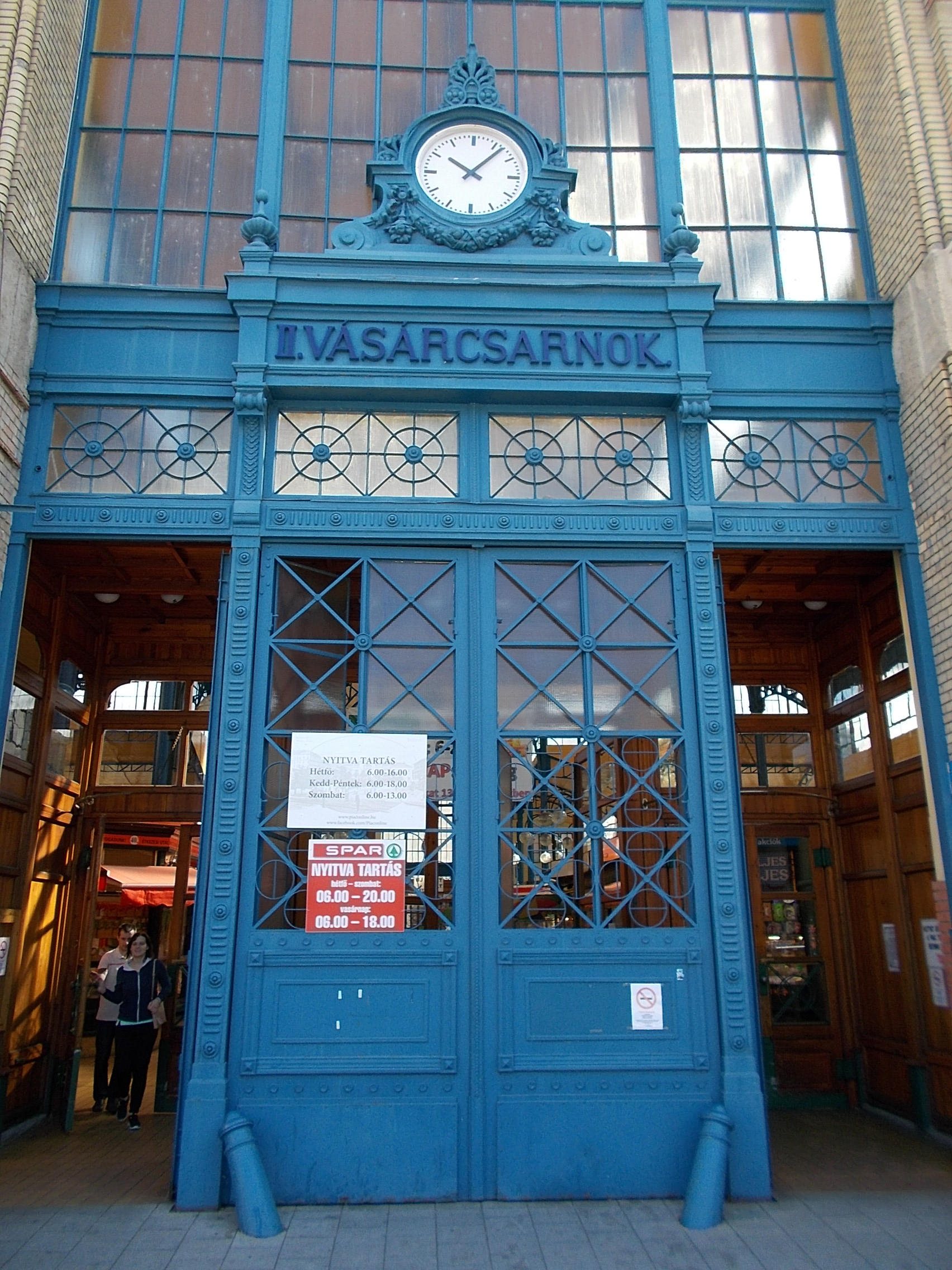

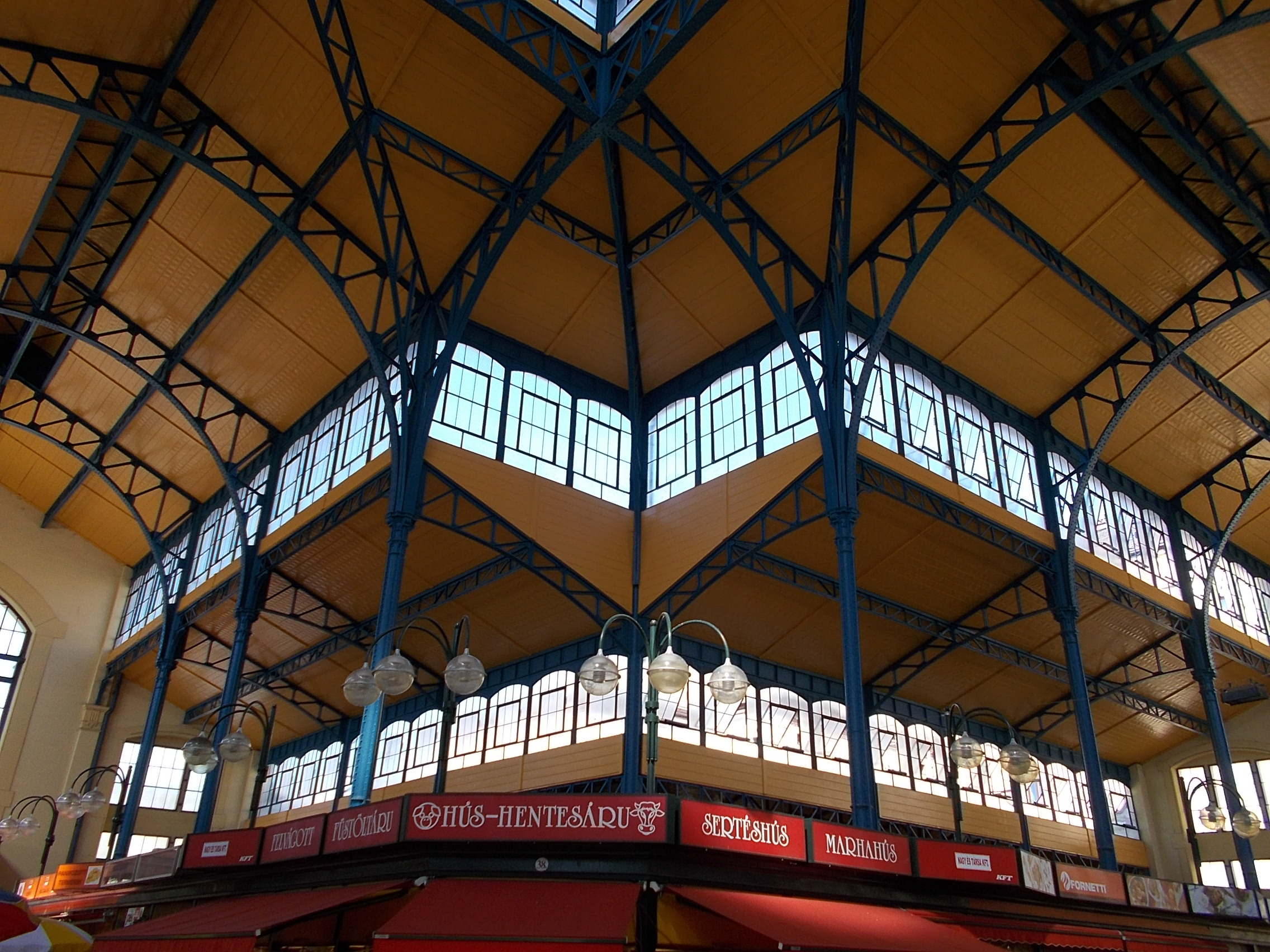

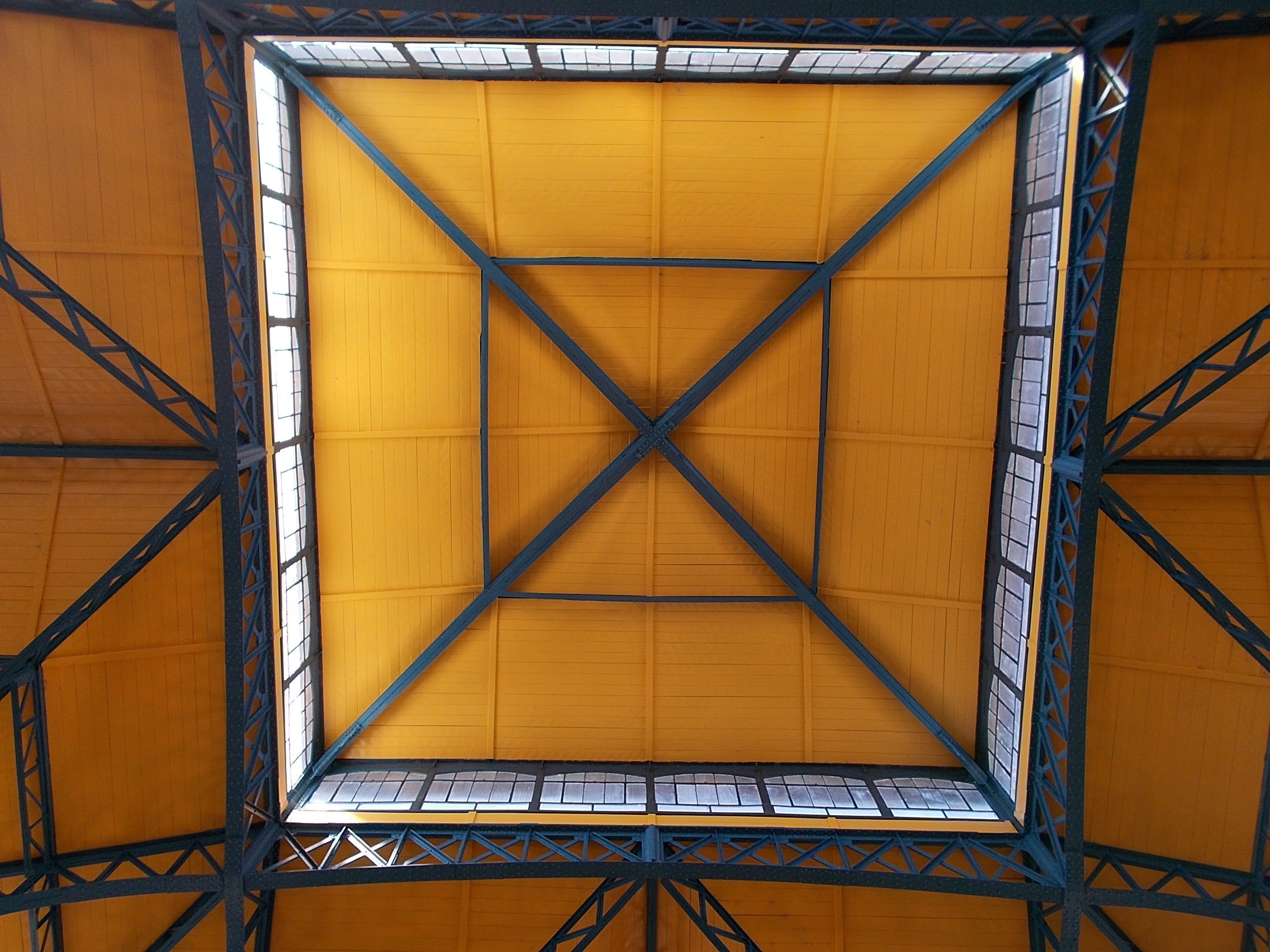

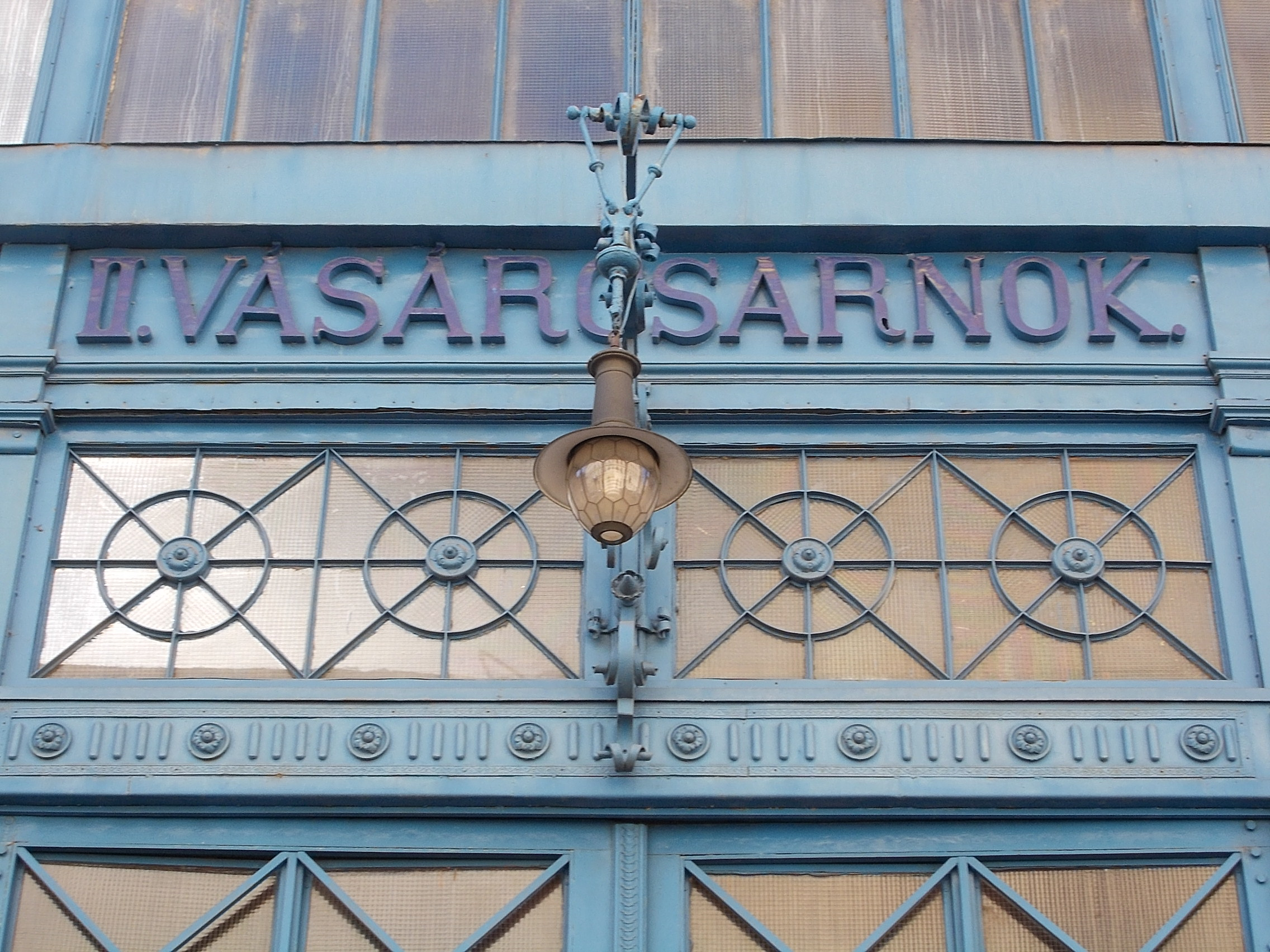

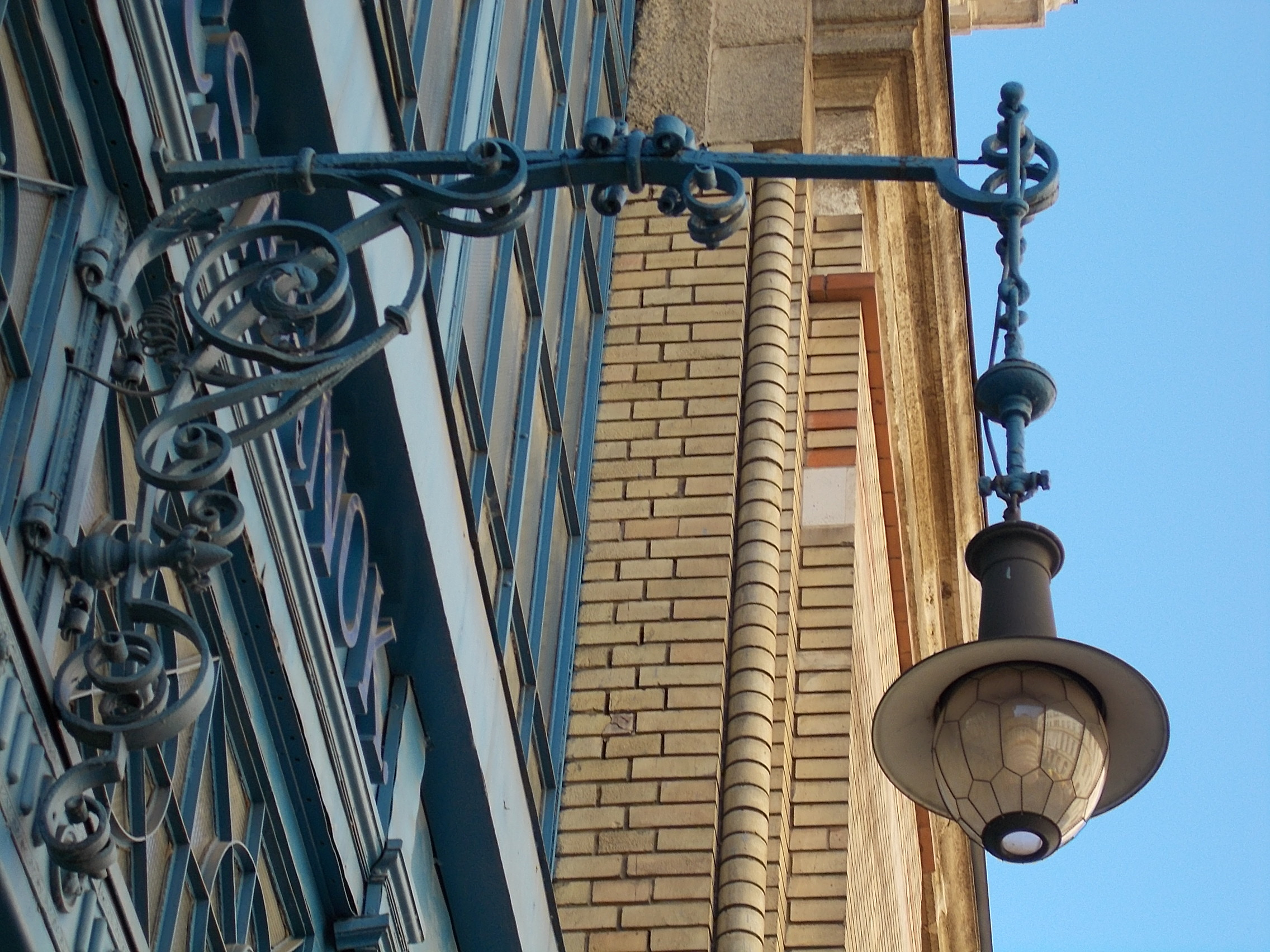

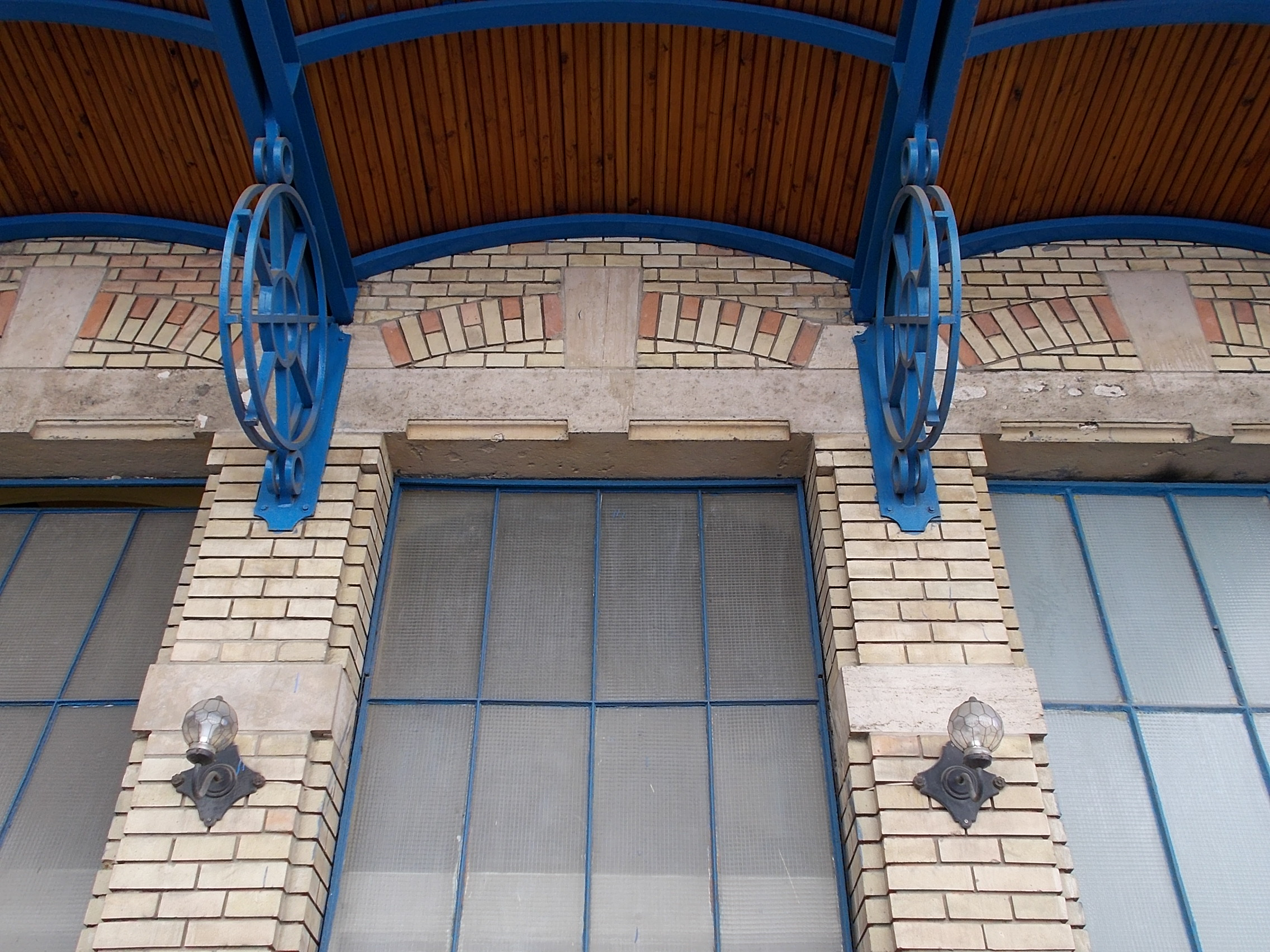

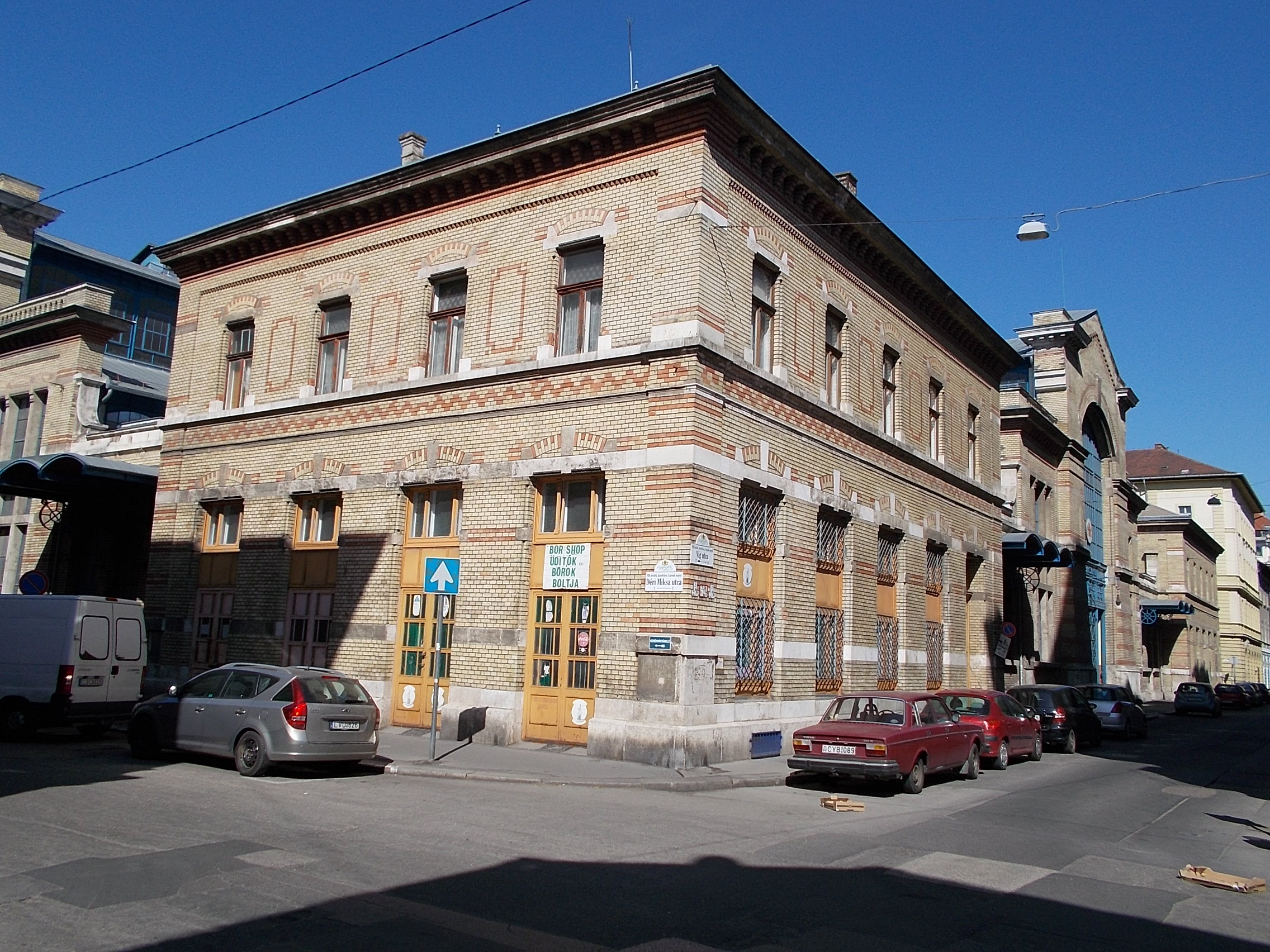

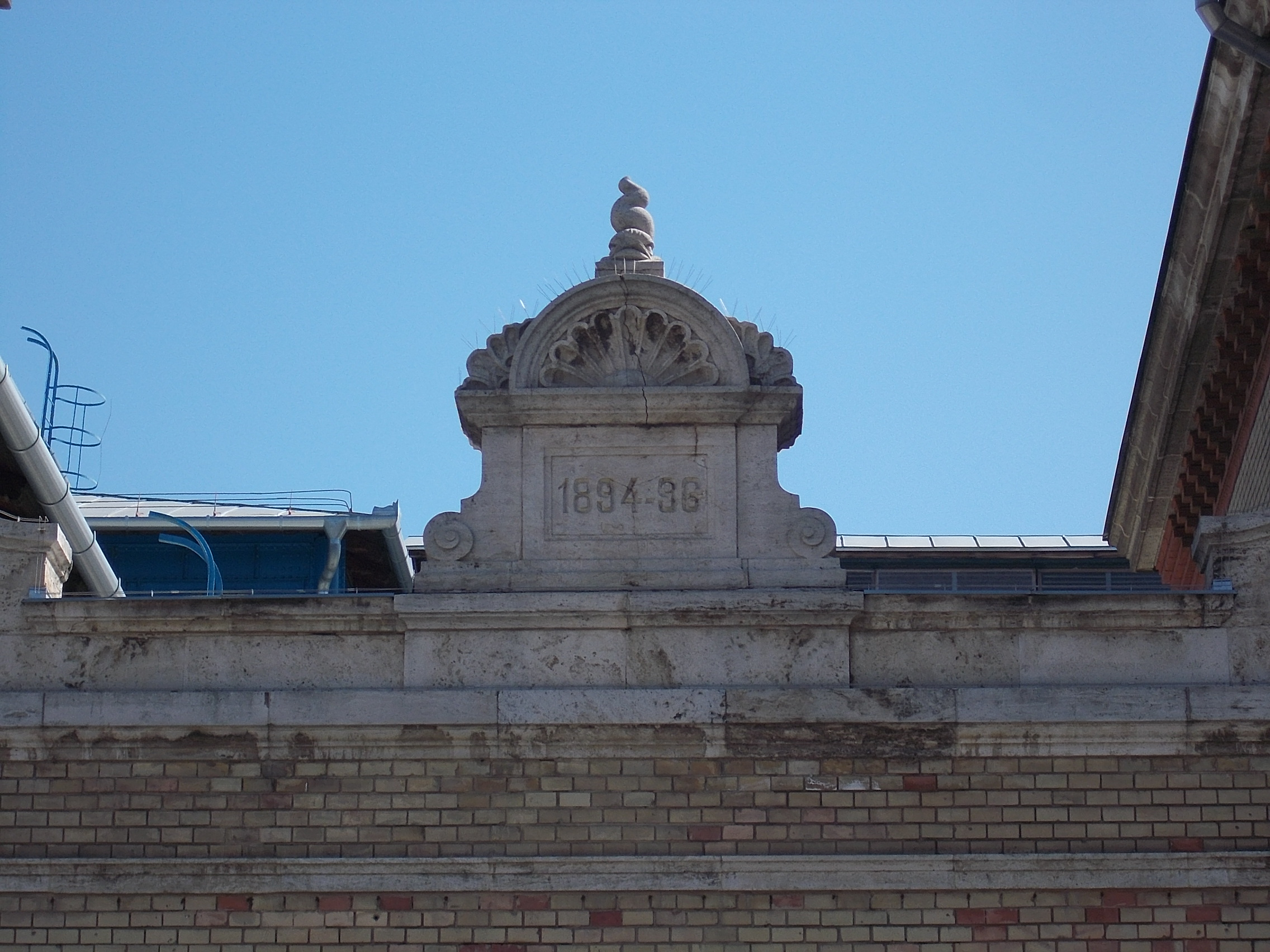

== Sources ==
- http://8.kerulet.ittlakunk.hu/holmi/uzletek/rakoczi-teri-vasarcsarnok
- http://budapestcity.org/03-muemlekek/08/Rakoczi-teri-vasarcsarnok/index-hu.htm
- http://www.bpht.hu/historiak/77.pdf
