= Claudiu Crăciun =

Romanian academic, activist and politician

Claudiu Crăciun (born 2 November 1978) is a Romanian academic, environmental and civic activist. A lecturer at the National School of Political Science and Public Administration, Crăciun has been active in Romanian civil society, having been involved in the 2012 Romanian protests, the 2013 Romanian protests against the Roșia Montană Project and the protests against illegal logging in 2015. He led a campaign to run as a candidate at the 2019 Romanian presidential election, which collected 13,000 signatures but failed to meet the threshold required (200,000) by Romanian electoral law. He is the Secretary-General of the Democracy and Solidarity Party (Demos), founded in 2016 and registered in 2018.

== Activism and protests ==
=== 2012 Romanian protests ===
In January 2012, Crăciun was one of the people involved in the 2012 Romanian protests. When Remus Cernea began his collaboration with the Social-Democrats by participating to a demonstration organized by them, Crăciun resigned from the party, accusing Cernea of "the immorality of pretending to represent the protesters" and claiming that he was trying the politicization of the protests. Crăciun argued that he wanted to "reinvent the citizen" before "reinventing the politician".

=== 2013 protests against the Roșia Montană Project ===
Crăciun was involved during the months-long 2013 protests as well, his level of involvement making the press to claim he was one of the "informal leaders" of the movement.

In 2014 Craciun was one of the civic activists asking for a complete reform of the electoral system in Romania. In 2015 he was also active in the protests against illegal logging in Romania.

=== Creation of the Democracy and Solidarity Party ===
Crăciun is the Secretary-General of the Democracy and Solidarity Party (Demos), which was started in 2015 as a platform and was made a political party on 15 September 2016. Demos was officially registered as one on 1 September 2018.
