= Máté Kocsis =

Hungarian jurist, sports administrator and politician

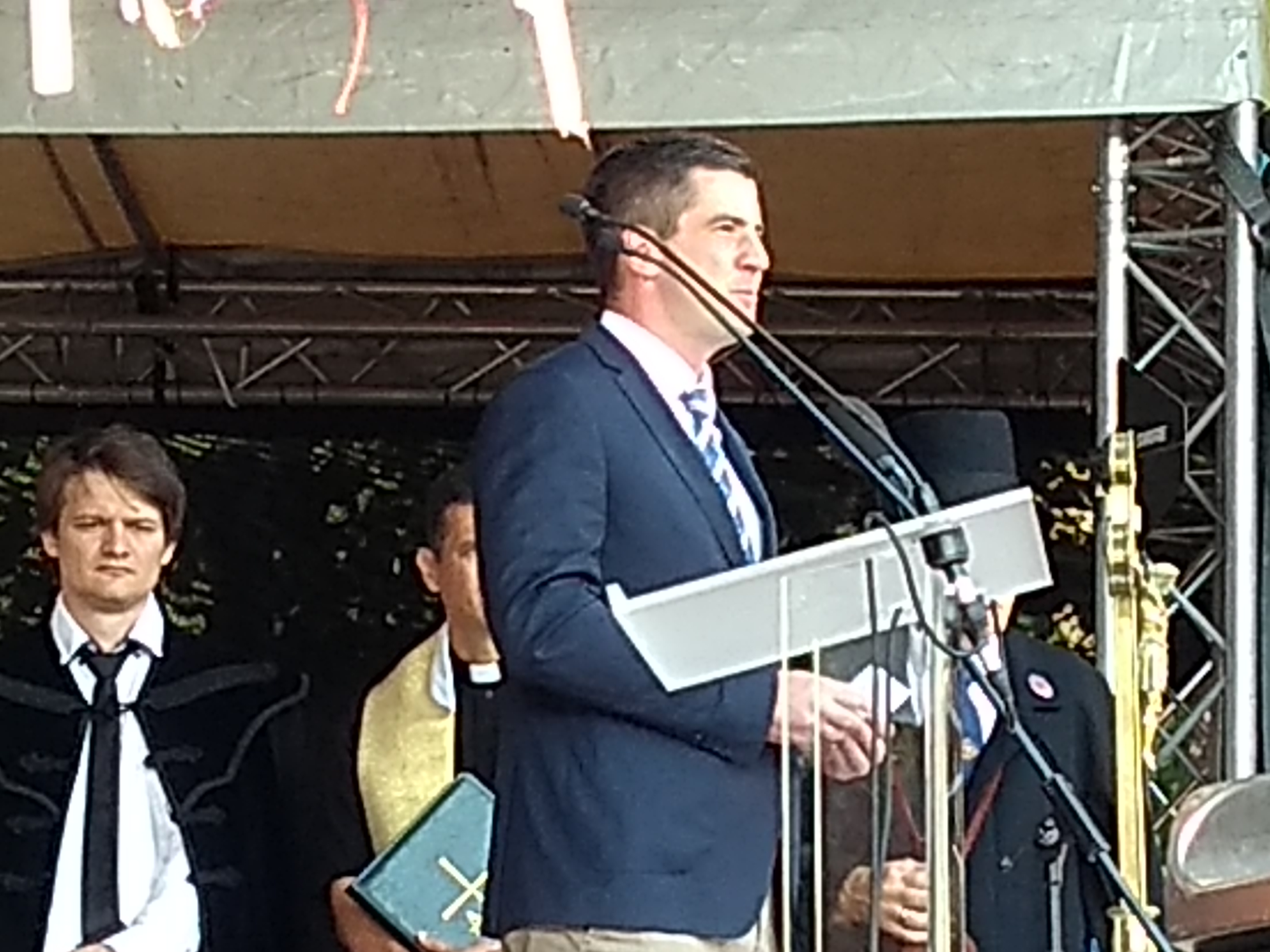

Mayor of Józsefváros District VIII, Budapest
- In office 22 November 2009 – 17 April 2018
- Preceded by: Béla Csécsei
- Succeeded by: Botond Sára

Member of the National Assembly
- Incumbent
- Assumed office 8 May 2018
- In office 14 May 2010 – 5 May 2014

Personal details
- Born: 6 May 1981 (age 45) Budapest, Hungary
- Party: MIÉP (1998–1999); Fidesz (since 2006)
- Spouse: Dr. Szilvia Márkus
- Children: Kristóf
- Profession: Jurist; politician; sports administrator

Máté Kocsis (born 6 May 1981) is a Hungarian jurist, sports administrator and politician, who served as Mayor of Józsefváros (8th district of Budapest) from 2009 to 2018. He also represents Józsefváros (Budapest Constituency XI then VI) in the National Assembly of Hungary from 2010 to 2014, and since 2018. He served as the leader of the Fidesz parliamentary group from 2018 to 2026. Since 2015 he is the president of the Hungarian Handball Federation.

== Biography ==
He graduated from the Calvinist Secondary Grammar School of Lónyay Street in 1999. He received his Juris Doctor degree at the Pázmány Péter Catholic University in 2004. He participated in the joint graduate school of the Századvég Political School and the Corvinus University of Budapest as a policy expert between 2004 and 2006.

He was a member of the far-right Hungarian Justice and Life Party (MIÉP) between 1998 and 1999. According to himself, his membership lasted 2 or 3 months.

Kocsis was delegated to the Budapest Electoral Commission by the Fidesz during the 2006 Hungarian parliamentary election. He was elected to the General Assembly of Józsefváros in the 2006 Hungarian local elections. He served as a Deputy Mayor of Józsefváros and leader of the Fidesz group from 2006 to 2009. He also became a member of the General Assembly of Budapest in 2006. He served as Vice Chairman of the Metropolitan Committee on Law and Procedure. Béla Csécsei, the Mayor of Józsefváros, resigned from his position for health reasons in 2009. Kocsis was elected mayor during a by-election on 22 November 2009. As a result he resigned from his seat in the General Assembly of Budapest.

He was elected Member of Parliament for Józsefváros in the 2010 Hungarian parliamentary election. He was appointed Chairman of the Defence and Internal Security Committee on 17 May 2010. He was also a member of the Committee on National Security since 14 February 2011. He was a member of the Ad Hoc Committee on Preparation of Constitution between 5 July 2010 and 7 March 2011, therefore he participated in the drawing up of the new constitution. In May 2011, Fidesz called for a fact-finding committee to be set up, examining the circumstances of tension between local Roma and non-Roma in the north Hungarian village of Gyöngyöspata. Kocsis became Chairman of that ad hoc committee.

Due to the new conflict of interest rules, Kocsis did not run in the 2014 parliamentary election. He was re-elected as mayor of Józsefváros during the 2014 local elections. He became councilor for local government and law enforcement in the General Assembly of Budapest. He was appointed president of his party's Budapest branch in October 2015. He also served as communication director of the Fidesz from December 2012 to 1 September 2016.

Kocsis returned to national politics, when he was elected a Member of Parliament for Józsefváros during the 2018 parliamentary election. As a result, he resigned as mayor on 17 April. Kocsis was elected leader of the Fidesz caucus in the national assembly. He was also appointed chairman of the Defence and Internal Security Committee for the second time. He was also a member of the National Security Committee from 2018 to 2026. Although he was elected MP via the Fidesz national list, he was replaced as caucus leader after 2026 Hungarian parliamentary election.

== Controversies ==
In November 2011, the General Assembly of Józsefváros passed decrees against the homeless people, which tried to force them to the homeless shelter. The city council also banned smoking, begging and sleeping on the streets for the homeless people. Police arrested activists from The City is For All (A Város Mindenkié) group when they demonstrated against the decrees. Several dozen protestors staged a sit-in at the mayor's office as part of the protest. Kocsis claimed that this was "the umpteenth time" that he had "offered collaboration", but the demonstrators had not taken up his offer.

A year after the announcement of the "law enforcement action", there were still many homeless people on the street. The office of the infringement was closed. According to some residents, the authorities were dispatched to collect the homeless people.

In January 2013, after an anti-Roma text written by journalist and Fidesz-member Zsolt Bayer in the newspaper Magyar Hírlap, Kocsis (the communications chief of the same party) stated that anyone who protested against the article "was putting himself on the side of murderers" - meaning the Roma.

The article was written after the murder of the Romani boxer Gergely Sávoly, and stated that a "considerable proportion of the gypsies are not fit to live among people. They are animals. These animals should certainly not exist...

In December 2014, Kocsis attracted international attention by proposing mandatory annual drug tests for children between the ages of 12 and 18, politicians and journalists.

In May 2015, liberal politician and LGBT activist Klára Ungár claimed that Kocsis is homosexual. Kocsis countered her comment, stating "I am not gay", and he sued Ungár. Although he won the lawsuit at first instance, he lost at second instance, as the court stated Kocsis did not argue why the incorrect statement was offensive. In Ungár's initial accusation, Kocsis' name appeared alongside that of József Szájer, a Fidesz MEP who was later caught escaping a gay sex orgy held in Brussels in violation of Belgian COVID-19 regulations on the night of 27 November 2020.

Political offices
Preceded by Béla Csécsei	Mayor of Józsefváros; 2009–2018	Succeeded by Botond Sára
National Assembly of Hungary
Preceded by Gergely Gulyás	Leader of the Fidesz parliamentary group 2018–2026	Succeeded by Gergely Gulyás
