= Józsefváros =

District in Budapest, Hungary

8th District of Budapest Budapest VIII. kerülete Józsefváros
- District
- District VIII
- Flag Coat of arms

- Location of District VIII in Budapest (shown in grey)
- Coordinates: 47°29′22″N 19°4′14″E
- Country: Hungary
- Region: Central Hungary
- City: Budapest
- Established: 17 November 1873
- Quarters: List: Corvin negyed; Csarnok negyed; Ganz negyed; Kerepesdűlő; Losonci negyed; Magdolna negyed; Népszínház negyed; Orczy negyed; Palotanegyed; Százados negyed; Tisztviselőtelep

Government
  - Mayor: András Pikó

Area
  - Total: 6.85 km^{2} (2.64 sq mi)
  - Rank: 19th

Population (2024)
  - Total: 70,309
  - Rank: 12th
  - Density: 10,264/km^{2} (26,580/sq mi)
- Demonym: nyolcadik kerületi ("8th districter")
- Time zone: UTC+1 (CET)
  - Summer (DST): UTC+2 (CEST)
- Postal code: 1081 ... 1089
- Website: jozsefvaros.hu/english/

Józsefváros (Hungarian pronunciation: [ˈjoːʒɛfvaːroʃ], German: Josefstadt) is the 8th district of Budapest, Hungary. It is the part of the city centre in the wider sense as one of the 18th–19th century older suburbs, close to Belváros.

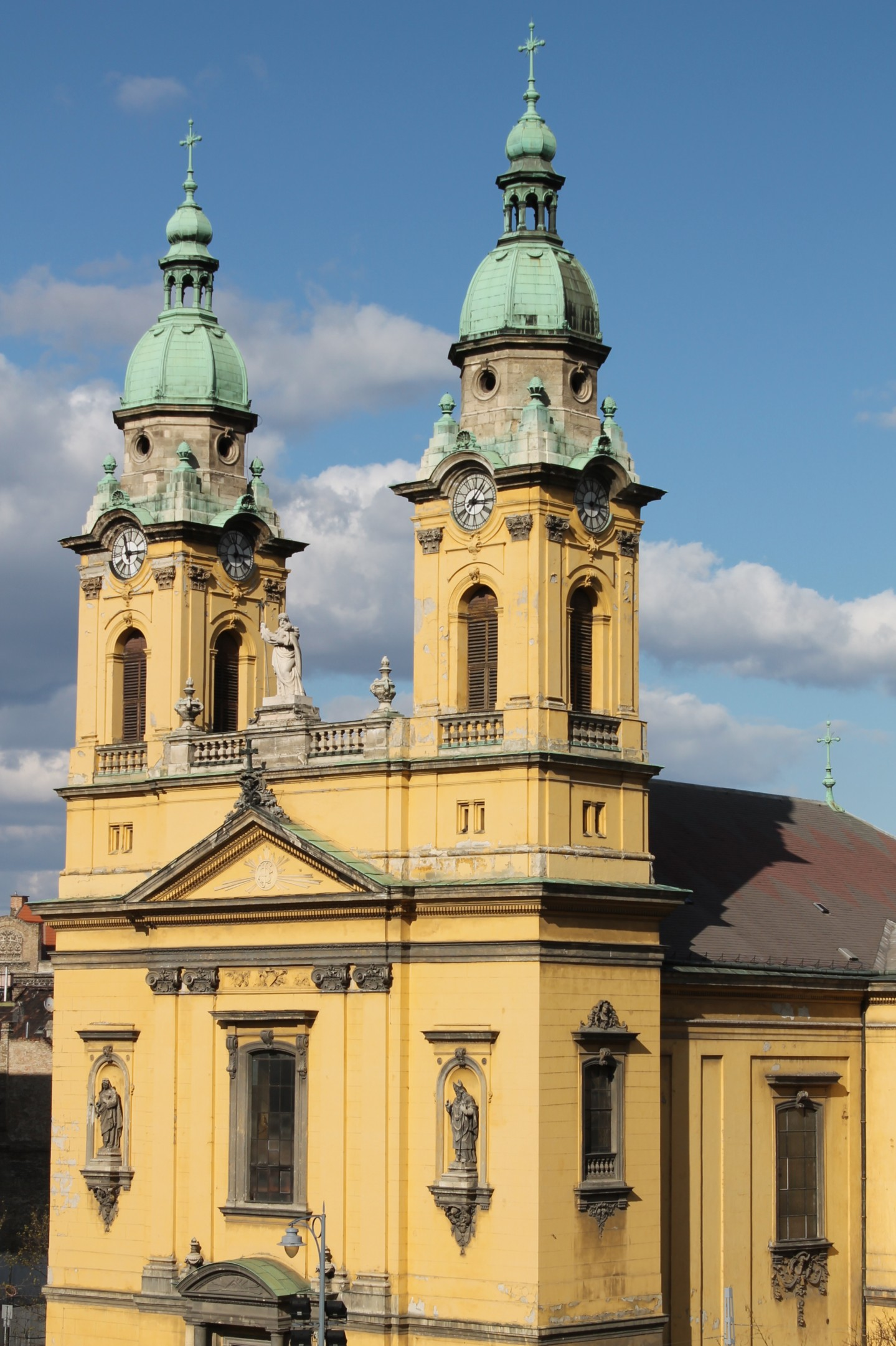
Budapest, St. Joseph Parish Church

== Location ==
The main streets in Józsefváros are Baross utca, Rákóczi út and Üllői út; Kálvin tér connects this district with the 5th and 9th. Keleti (Eastern) Railway Station is located at the junction of 7th, 8th and 14th districts.

== Name ==
The 18th-century suburb was first called Alsó-Külváros (literally "Lower Suburb"). It was named after the heir of the Hungarian throne, Emperor Joseph II in 1777.

== Description ==
Józsefváros mostly consists of old, often neglected residential buildings with nice interiors. It can be divided into three parts, the borders being Grand Boulevard (Nagykörút) and the roads Fiumei út and Orczy út.

The innermost, central part includes several spots, such as the National Museum, and the central buildings of the Eötvös Loránd University, the Semmelweis University, the Academy of Drama and Film, and the Metropolitan Ervin Szabó Library, complemented by the Kempelen Farkas Student Information and Resource Centre. The Piarist Secondary School, the main building of the Károli Gáspár University of the Reformed Church, and the law faculty of the Pázmány Péter Catholic University are also situated here, as well as the Hungarian Radio. This part is called "Palace Quarter", out of which one can still see Wenckheim Palace, hosting the Metropolitan Library, and Pálffy Palace with the Classical Music Collection of the above. This neighborhood underwent major renovations between 1996 and 2002 and it has become a happy, swarming place with scores of students and several cafés and pizzerias.

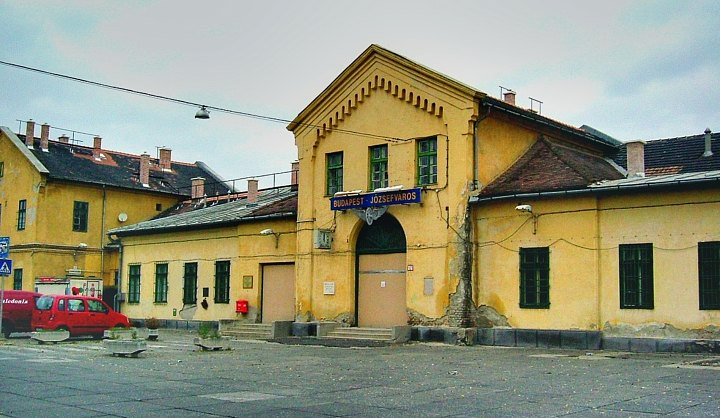
Józsefváros railway station

The second part, beyond Nagykörút (about 0.8 kilometres or 1/2 mile farther) has a worse reputation, due to the prostitution that was rampant in the 1990s (and earlier), which has been mostly eliminated through cameras throughout the district. In this part one can find the Centre for Foreign Languages (the oldest and "authentic" language examination place in Hungary), Erkel Theatre (a department of the Hungarian State Opera House), the Hungarian Natural History Museum, Corvin Budapest Film Palace (a multiplex cinema), one of Budapest's biggest gardens (Orczy-kert), and a large complex of cliniques.

Its traditional craftsmen neighbourhood, which became a slum in the previous decades, is currently under re-development. The dilapidated 19th century housing stock is cleared to make way for large office blocks and housing developments. Corvin-Szigony Project is the biggest urban renewal project in Central-Europe. The effects and methods of the project were criticized, mainly for the destruction of the architectural heritage of the area.

The residential parts occupy less area in the third part, which is noted for Eastern Railway Station, Józsefváros Railway Station and Kerepesi Cemetery, one of the most famous cemeteries in Hungary, with mausoleums for the most reputable historical personalities.

== Neighborhoods and metro ==
The district is administratively divided into 11 neighborhoods: 1. Palotanegyed; 2. Népszínház; 3. Csarnok; 4. Magdolna; 5. Corvin (neighborhood); 6. Losonci; 7. Orczy; 8. Kerepesdűlő; 9. Százados; 10. Ganz; 11. Tisztviselőtelep	The following Budapest Metro stations are located in the area: 1. Astoria ; 2. Blaha Lujza tér ; 3. Keleti pályaudvar ; 4. Puskás Ferenc Stadion ; 5. Népliget ; 6. Nagyvárad tér ; 7. Semmelweis Klinikák ; 8. Corvin-negyed ; 9. Kálvin tér ; 10. Rákóczi tér ; 11. II. János Pál pápa tér

== Demographics ==
According to 2011 census, the population of the district was 76,250. It is relatively homogeneous with the Hungarian majority. Józsefváros is noted for its high concentrations of Roma (Gypsy) residents (4.5%). The district has attracted a significant number of Chinese immigrants (0.8%).

== Politics ==
The current mayor of VIII. District of Budapest is András Pikó (member of c8 - NGO in VIII district - supported by Momentum).

The District Assembly, elected at the 2019 local government elections, is made up of 18 members (1 Mayor, 12 Individual constituencies MEPs and 5 Compensation List MEPs) divided into this political parties and alliances:

Party	Seats	Current District Assembly
Opposition coalition (Note: Coalition of Momentum–DK–MSZP–Dialogue–LMP–Solidarity.)	12	M
Fidesz-KDNP	6	

=== List of mayors ===
Member	Party	Date
Zoltán Koppány	SZDSZ	1990–1992 (Note: Resigned)
Béla Csécsei	SZDSZ	1993–2009
Máté Kocsis	Fidesz	2009–2018
Botond Sára	Fidesz	2018–2019
András Pikó	Ind.	2019–

== Related novels and movies ==
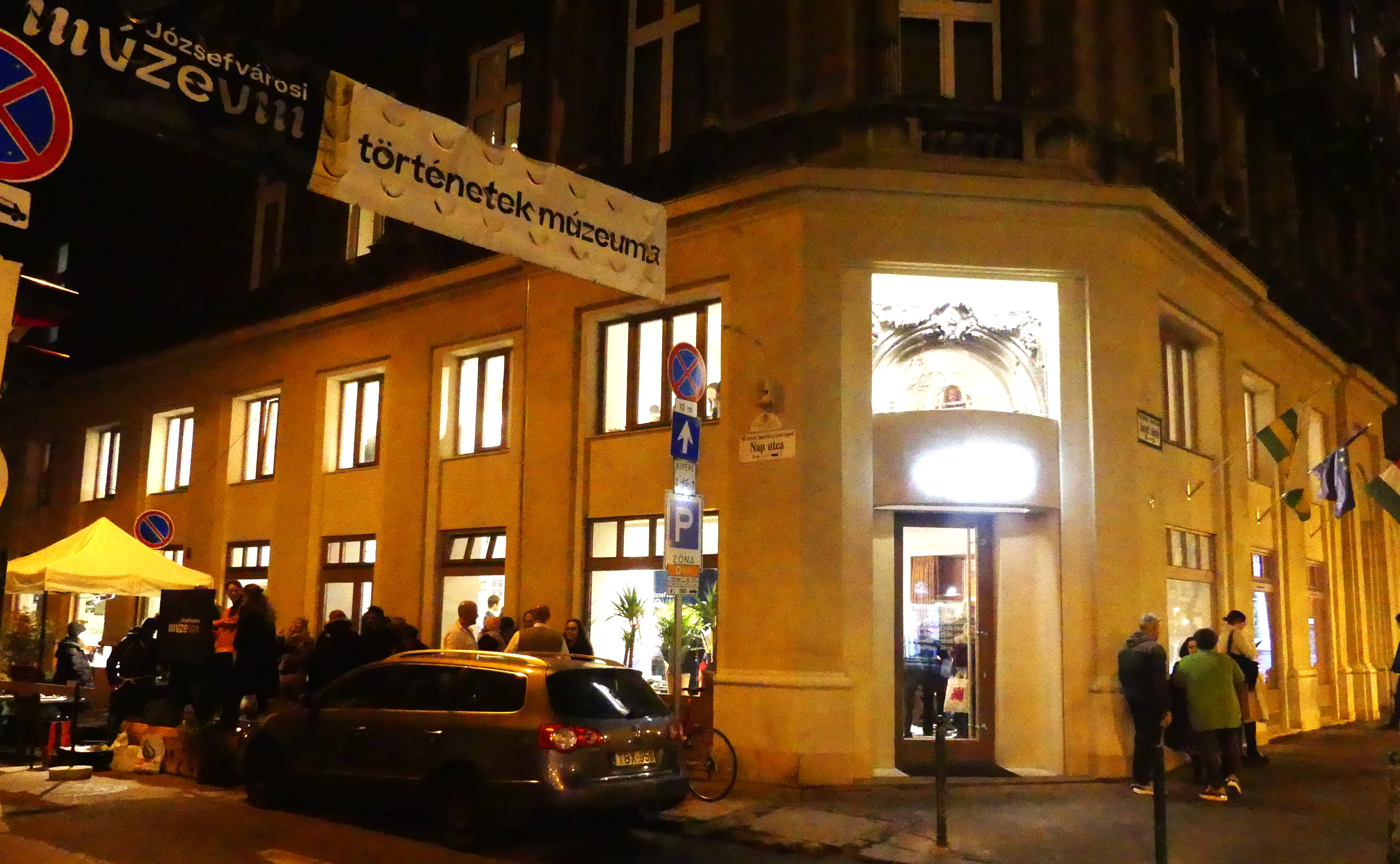
Where Nyócker stories are stored - Józsefváros Museum opens its doors...

Ferenc Molnár's youth novel, The Paul Street Boys (A Pál utcai fiúk, 1907), which was made into film several times (see the Imdb entry of the most famous version), originally takes place at real venues of this district: Pál utca, Mária utca and Füvészkert (botanical garden).

In 2004, a caricaturistic animated movie Nyócker was made about an infamous part of this district which has been screened in several European countries and won numerous awards on the international scene.

The starting and closing scenes of Fateless (Sorstalanság, 2005), the movie made from Imre Kertész's Nobel Prize–winning novel, were screened in this district, namely at Lőrinc pap tér.

The second season of Baptiste, a British TV Drama, takes place around Jozsefvaros, and hate crimes against the immigrant population that lives there.

== Twin towns ==
Józsefváros is twinned with:

- Pescina, Italy
- District VIII of Vienna, Austria
- Iosefin of Timișoara, Romania
- Küçükçekmece of Istanbul, Turkey
- Aalborg, Denmark
- Ibbenbüren, Germany

== See also ==
- Auróra, community centre in the district
- Palotanegyed, a neighborhood in the district.
- Rákóczi Square Market Hall
- List of districts in Budapest

== Gallery ==
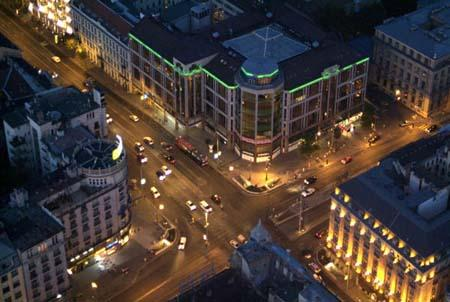
Astoria

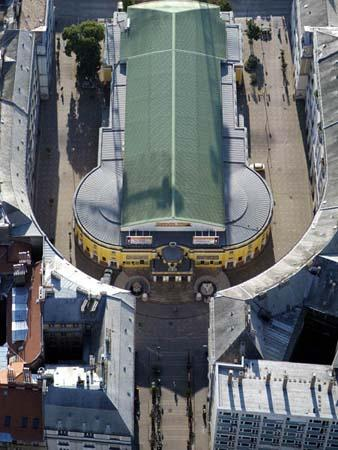
Corvin alley

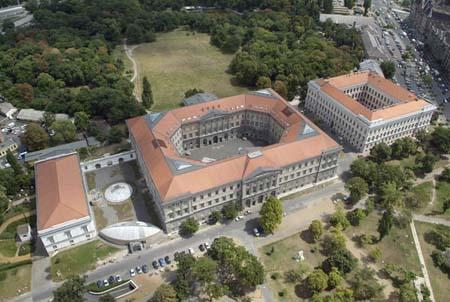
Ludovika square

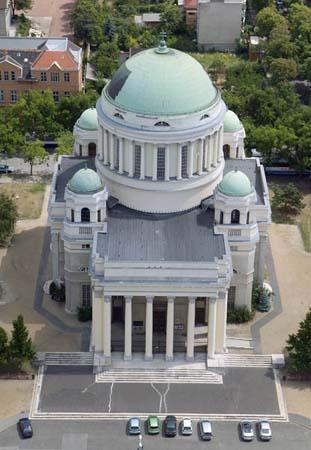
Rezső square

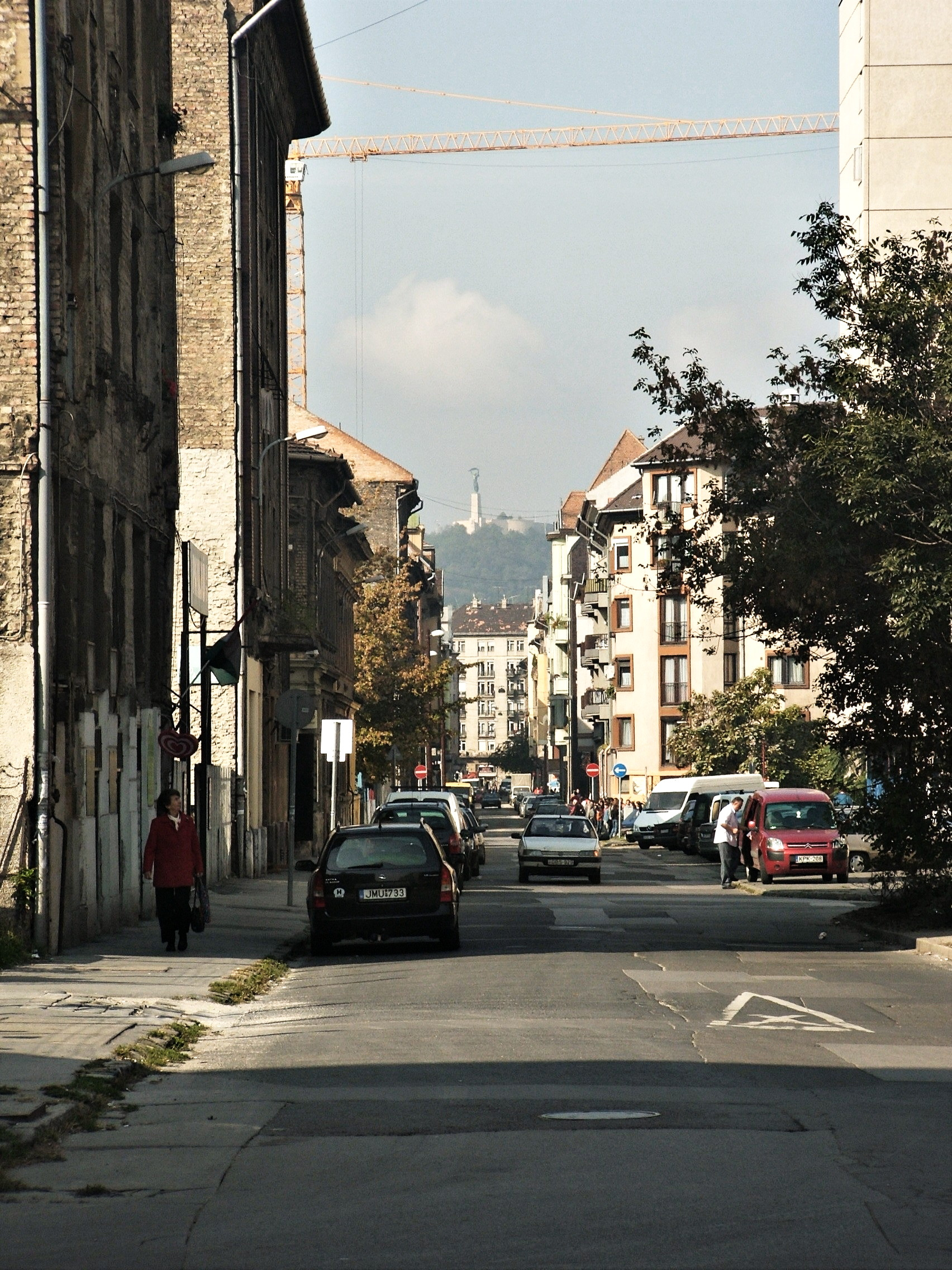
Práter utca

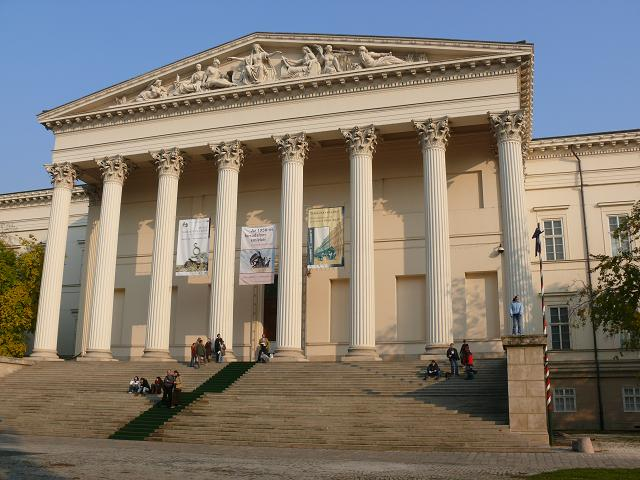
Magyar Nemzeti Múzeum
