= Fifth Orbán government =

Government of Hungary, 2022–2026

- 73rd Cabinet of Hungary
- 2022 – 2026
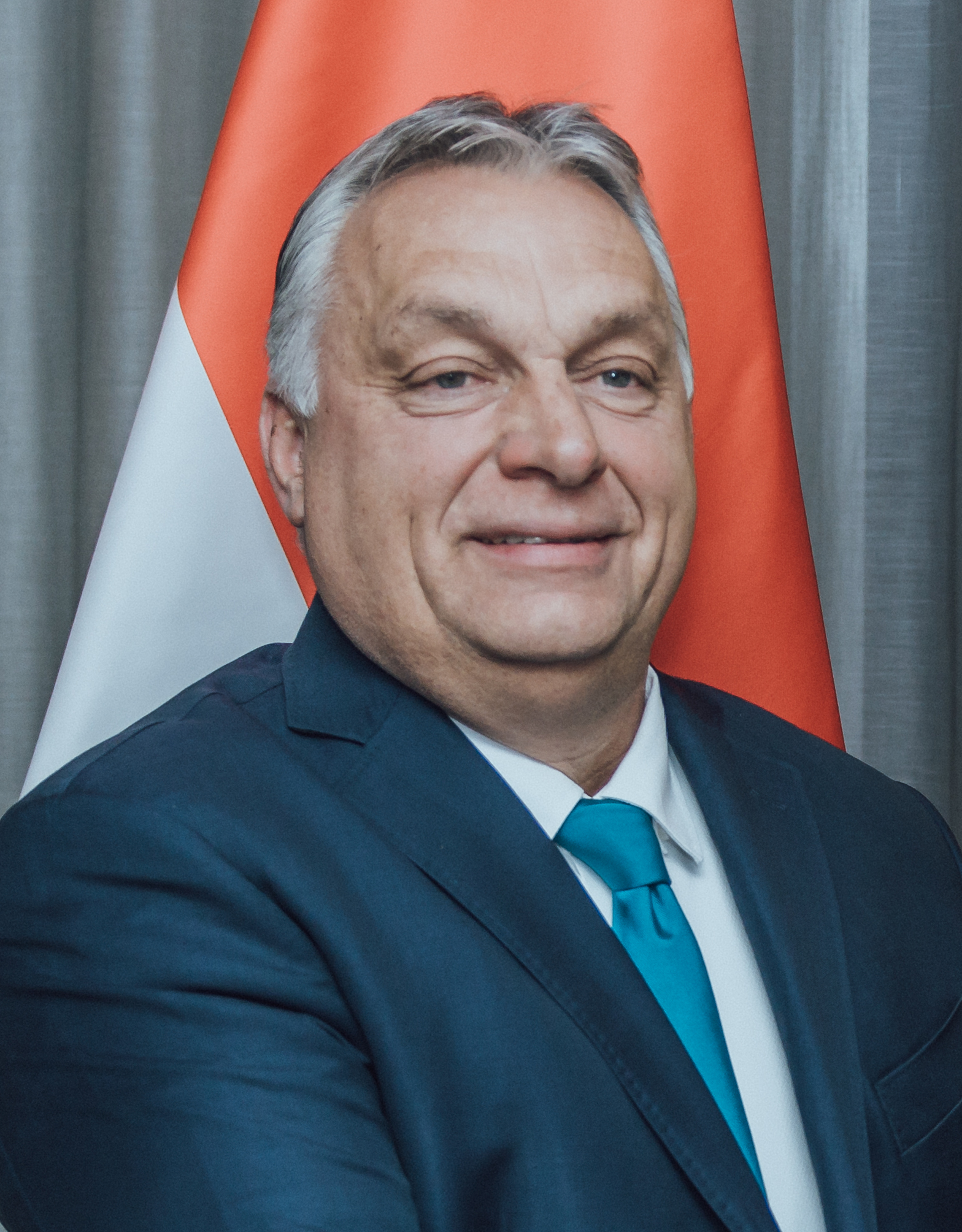
- Date formed: 24 May 2022 (4 years ago)
- Date dissolved: 13 May 2026

People and organisations
- Head of state: Katalin Novák; László Kövér (acting); Tamás Sulyok
- Head of government: Viktor Orbán
- Head of government's history: 1998–2002, 2010–2026
- Deputy head of government: Zsolt Semjén
- No. of ministers: 15
- Member party: Fidesz; KDNP
- Status in legislature: Supermajority
- Opposition party: DK; Jobbik; Momentum; MSZP; Párbeszéd; MH; LMP
- Opposition leader: Parliamentary: Ferenc Gyurcsány (DK) (2022–2025); Klára Dobrev (DK) (2025–2026); Extra-parliamentary, most popular: Péter Magyar (TISZA) (2024–2026)

History
- Election: 2022 election
- Outgoing election: 2026 election
- Legislature terms: 2022–2026
- Predecessor: Orbán IV
- Successor: Magyar

The fifth Orbán government was the 73rd Government of Hungary and the fourth cabinet of the second Orbán premiership, from 24 May 2022 to 9 May 2026, following the 2022 parliamentary elections, led by Viktor Orbán.

== Policy ==
=== Social policy ===
On 15 September 2022, the Hungarian government passed new abortion restrictions, with a mandatory ultrasounds bill, where women who are seeking an abortion will now be obliged to "listen to the foetal heartbeat" before they can have an abortion. This bill was lobbied for by the far-right Mi Hazánk (Our Homeland) party.

In March 2025, the Hungarian government voted in favour of banning the Budapest Pride, promising to impose fines on both organizers and participants who would attempt to attend the march. The Law passed by 136 votes to 27. Fidesz–KDNP, Mi Hazánk and Jobbik voted for the law.

In April 2025, the Hungarian parliament passed constitutional amendments, it will protect the "right to use cash", mandate the existence of only two genders (male or female), and Hungarian citizenship of dual citizens may be suspended for definite periods of time. The Law passed by 140 votes to 21. Fidesz-KDNP and Mi Hazánk supported the amendments.

=== Foreign policy ===
In December 2023, the European Council agreed to open accession negotiations with Ukraine, as well as Moldova. Hungary under Orban did not veto the move. Prime Minister Viktor Orban left the room momentarily in what officials described as a pre-agreed and constructive manner, while the other 26 leaders went ahead with the vote.

In June 2024, Orban helped to form the Patriots for Europe group in the European Parliament.

In April 2025, the Hungarian Government announced it will withdraw from the International Criminal Court.

In May 2025, the Hungarian National Assembly approved a bill to initiate the country's withdrawal from the International Criminal Court (ICC), marking Hungary as the first European Union member state to take such action. The bill, introduced by Deputy Prime Minister Zsolt Semjén, passed with 134 votes in favor, 37 against, and 7 abstentions.

In 2024 and 2026, The Orban government gave political asylum to Polish conservative politicians Marcin Romanowski and Zbigniew Ziobro.

=== Schengen policy ===
On 5 August 2024, 70 members of the European Parliament officially requested that Hungary's membership in the Schengen Area be cancelled, because they felt that a recent Hungarian decision to open Hungarian visas to workers from eight countries, among which were Russia and Belarus, was contrary to the spirit of the agreement.

=== Economic policy ===
On 6 June 2024, the Hungarian government bought back ownership of Budapest Ferenc Liszt International Airport. The Hungarian government will own 80% while Vinci Airports will take 20%. The airport was sold off in 2005.

== Party breakdown ==
Party breakdown of cabinet ministers:

- Fidesz
8
- KDNP
2
- Independents
5

== Vote in parliament ==
Election of the Prime Minister; Viktor Orbán (Fidesz)
Ballot →	16 May 2022
Required majority →	100 out of 199
Yes: • Fidesz (114); • KDNP (18); • MNOÖ (1)	133 / 199
No: • MSZP (8); • Momentum (6); • MH (6); • Dialogue (4); • LMP (3)	27 / 199
Abstain	0 / 199
Not voting: • DK (15); • Jobbik (10); • Momentum (4); • Fidesz (3); • MSZP (2); • LMP (2); • Dialogue (2); • Independent (1)	39 / 199

== Members of the Cabinet ==
Office	Name	Party	Term
Cabinet Office of the Prime Minister
Prime Minister	Viktor Orbán	Fidesz	2022–2026
Minister of Cabinet Office of the Prime Minister	Antal Rogán	Fidesz	2022–2026
Prime Minister's Office
Deputy Prime Minister	Zsolt Semjén	KDNP	2022–2026
Minister of the Prime Minister's Office	Gergely Gulyás	Fidesz	2022–2026
Ministers
Minister of Foreign Affairs and Trade	Péter Szijjártó	Fidesz	2022–2026
Minister of Interior	Sándor Pintér	Independent	2022–2026
Minister of Justice	Judit Varga	Fidesz	2022–2023
Minister of Justice	Bence Tuzson	Fidesz	2023–2026
Minister of Finance	Mihály Varga	Fidesz	2022–2024
Minister of Culture and Innovation	János Csák	Independent	2022–2024
Minister of Culture and Innovation	Balázs Hankó	Independent	2024–2026
Minister of Technology and Industry (Until 13 November 2022)	László Palkovics	Independent	2022
Minister of Energy (From 1 December 2022)	Csaba Lantos	Independent	2022–2026
Minister of Agriculture	István Nagy	Fidesz	2022–2026
Minister of Defence of Hungary	Kristóf Szalay-Bobrovniczky	Independent	2022–2026
Minister of Construction and Transport (Until 30 November 2022: Minister of Construction and Investment)	János Lázár	Fidesz	2022–2026
Minister for National Economy (Until 31 December 2023: Minister for Economic Development)	Márton Nagy	Independent	2022–2026
Minister of Public Administration and Regional Development (Until 31 December 2023: Minister of Regional Development)	Tibor Navracsics	KDNP	2022–2026
Minister of European Union Affairs (From 1 July 2023)	János Bóka	Independent	2023–2026
Minister for National Politics, Nationality Politics, Church Politics and Church Diplomacy	Zsolt Semjén	KDNP	2022–2026

== Composition ==
Orbán announced the members of his fifth cabinet in early May 2022.

Office	Image	Incumbent	Political party	In office
Prime Minister		Viktor Orbán	Fidesz	16 May 2022 – 9 May 2026
Deputy Prime Minister Minister for National Politics, Nationality Politics, Church Politics and Church Diplomacy		Zsolt Semjén	KDNP	24 May 2022 – 13 May 2026
Minister of the Cabinet Office of the Prime Minister		Antal Rogán	Fidesz	24 May 2022 – 13 May 2026
Minister of the Prime Minister's Office		Gergely Gulyás	Fidesz	24 May 2022 – 13 May 2026
Minister of Finance		Mihály Varga	Fidesz	24 May 2022 – 31 December 2024
Minister of Interior		Sándor Pintér	Independent	24 May 2022 – 13 May 2026
Minister of Foreign Affairs and Trade		Péter Szijjártó	Fidesz	24 May 2022 – 13 May 2026
Minister of Justice		Judit Varga	Fidesz	24 May 2022 – 31 July 2023
Minister of Justice		Bence Tuzson	Fidesz	1 August 2023 – 13 May 2026
Minister of Culture and Innovation		János Csák	Independent	24 May 2022 – 30 June 2024
Minister of Culture and Innovation		Balázs Hankó	Independent	1 July 2024 – 13 May 2026
Minister of Technology and Industry		László Palkovics	Independent	24 May 2022 – 13 November 2022
Minister of Energy		Csaba Lantos	Independent	1 December 2022 – 13 May 2026
Minister of Agriculture		István Nagy	Fidesz	24 May 2022 – 13 May 2026
Minister of Defence		Kristóf Szalay-Bobrovniczky	Independent	24 May 2022 – 13 May 2026
Minister of Construction and Transport (Until 30 November 2022: Minister of Construction and Investment)		János Lázár	Fidesz	24 May 2022 – 13 May 2026
Minister for National Economy (Until 31 December 2023: Minister for Economic Development)		Márton Nagy	Independent	24 May 2022 – 13 May 2026
Minister of European Union Affairs		János Bóka	Independent	1 August 2023 – 13 May 2026
Minister of Public Administration and Regional Development (Until 31 December 2023: Minister for Regional Development)		Tibor Navracsics	KDNP	24 May 2022 – 13 May 2026

== See also ==
- Slovakia's Fico's Fourth Cabinet
