= Pest County 5th constituency =

- Constituency for the National Assembly
- Location of Pest county 05 within Pest county

- Location of Pest county within Hungary
- County: Pest
- Electorate: 75,681 (2026)
- Major settlements: Dunakeszi

Current constituency
- Created: 2024
- Party: Tisza Party
- Member: Orsolya Miskolczi
- Elected: 2026

The Pest County 5th parliamentary constituency is one of the 106 constituencies into which the territory of Hungary is divided by Act LXXIX of 2024, and in which voters can elect one member of the National Assembly. The standard abbreviation of the constituency name is: Pest 05. OEVK. The seat is Dunakeszi.

== Area ==
The constituency includes the following settlements:

1. Csomád
2. Csömör
3. Dunakeszi
4. Fót
5. Göd

== Members of Parliament ==
Name	Party	Term	Elections
Tuzson Bence	Fidesz-KDNP	2014 –	Results of the 2014 parliamentary election:
Tuzson Bence	Fidesz-KDNP	2014 –	Results of the 2018 parliamentary election:
Tuzson Bence	Fidesz-KDNP	2014 –	Results of the 2022 parliamentary election:
Orsolya Miskolczi	Tisza Party	2026 – present	Results of the 2026 parliamentary election: 62.09%

== Demographics ==
The demographics of the constituency are as follows. The population of the 5th constituency of Pest County was 129,699 on 1 October 2022. The population of the constituency increased by 18,467 between the 2011 and 2022 censuses. Based on the age composition, the middle-aged population is the largest in the constituency with 48,923 people, while the elderly are the smallest with 21,420 people. 91.2% of the population of the constituency has internet access.

Historical population
Year	Pop.	±%
2011	111,232	—
2022	129,699	+16.6%

According to the highest level of completed education, those with a high school diploma are the most numerous, with 38,727 people, followed by graduates with 34,246 people.

According to economic activity, almost half of the population is employed, 67,457 people, the second most significant group is inactive earners, who are mainly pensioners, with 22,695 people.

The most significant ethnic group in the constituency is Germans with 1,150 people and Gypsies with 508 people. The proportion of foreign citizens without Hungarian citizenship is 1.1%.

According to religious composition, the largest religion of the residents of the constituency is Roman Catholic (24,728 people), and there is also a significant community of Calvinists (9,803 people). The number of those not belonging to a religious community is also significant (16,768 people), the second largest group in the constituency after the Roman Catholic religion.

== Parliamentary elections ==
=== 2022 ===
2022 Hungarian parliamentary election
Party	Candidate
Valódi Demokrata Párt	Lőrincz László
Mi Hazánk	Kovács Mátyás
Normális Élet Pártja	Szuchányi Gábor
MKKP	Bürger Zoltán
Fidesz-KDNP	Tuzson Bence
Egységben Magyarországért	Dorosz Dávid
MEMO	Kovács Roxána

=== 2018 ===
2018 Hungarian parliamentary election
Party	Candidate	Votes	%	± %
Fidesz-KDNP	Bence Tuzson	30,535	43.27	▲1.94
DK	Sándor Rónai	25,574	36.24	▲5.4
Jobbik	Peter Zoltán Varga	10,900	15.45	▼0.92
Momentum	Akos Kohut	2,500	3.54	-
Egyéb pártok		1,052	1.72	▼1.67
Turnout		71,465	76.24	▲9.26
Total number of voters		93,735	100%	▲5.66
Fidesz-KDNP holds the district.

=== 2014 ===
2014 Hungarian parliamentary election
Party	Candidate	Votes	%
Fidesz-KDNP	Dr. Tuzson Bence Balázs	24,344	41.33
Összefogás	Imre Szabó	18,166	30.84
Jobbik	Martin Nyiri	9,641	16.37
LMP	Peter Juhasz	4,515	7.66
Szociáldemokraták	Attila Fazekas	246	0.42
Egyéb pártok		1,994	3.39
Turnout		59,410	66.98
Total number of voters		88,702	100%
Fidesz-KDNP holds the district.

== Opposition primary election – 2021 ==
2021 Hungarian opposition primary
Faction	Nominating organizations	Candidate	Votes	%
Dialogue – The Greens' Party	Párbeszéd, LMP, MSZP, Jobbik	Dávid Dorosz	6,687	62.48%
DK	DK, Liberálisok, MMM	Peter Tonzor	3,519	32.88%
ÚVNP/LMP	ÚVNP	László Fekete	496	4.63%
Total votes			10,702	100%
Dorosz Dávid wins the district.

== Sources ==
- ↑ Vjt.: "2011. évi CCIII. törvény az országgyűlési képviselők választásáról". Nemzeti Jogszabálytár. Magyar Közlöny Lap- és Könyvkiadó Kft.
- ↑ KSH: "Az országgyűlési egyéni választókerületek adatai". Népszámlálás 2011. Központi Statisztikai Hivatal.
