= András Kármán =

Hungarian politician (born 1973)

- Kármán in 2026

Minister of Finance
- Incumbent
- Assumed office 13 May 2026
- Prime Minister: Péter Magyar
- Preceded by: Márton Nagy (as Minister for National Economy)

Member of the National Assembly
- Incumbent
- Assumed office 9 May 2026
- Constituency: National list

Personal details
- Born: András Miklós Kármán; 25 May 1973 (age 53) Keszthely, Hungary
- Party: TISZA

András Miklós Kármán (born 25 May 1973) is a Hungarian politician and economist who was elected member of the National Assembly in 2026. From 2010 to 2011, he served as state secretary for taxation and financial regulation at the Ministry for National Economy.

== Early life and education ==
He was born in Keszthely in 1973, during the Hungarian People’s Republic. He earned a degree in finance from Corvinus University of Budapest in 1997. Prior to that—in 1995 and 1996—he also studied at the University of Groningen in the Netherlands. Between 1993 and 1997, he was a member of the Széchenyi István College, and in 1995 he was elected student leader.

== Career ==
Before graduating, in 1996, he began working as an external expert for the Ministry of Finance. In 1997, he joined the Hungarian National Bank (MNB), where he served as an analyst until 2001, when he was appointed head of the Monetary Regulation Department. From 2007 to 2010, he served as Director of Financial Analysis. During this three-year period, he represented the MNB at board meetings of the Government Debt Management Agency and on the European Central Bank’s Market Operations Committee, and he was a member of the board of directors of Keler Zrt.

On June 2, 2010, President László Sólyom appointed him State Secretary of the newly established Ministry for National Economy. His leaving was announced in October 2011; from December 1, 2011, through 2014, he served as Hungary’s alternate director on the Board of Directors of the European Bank for Reconstruction and Development (EBRD). He subsequently left the government sector and has served as CEO and Chairman of Erste Lakástakarék Zrt. since June 8, 2017. He is credited with establishing Erste’s mortgage bank, which he has led as CEO since its founding in December 2015.

Since September 2025, he has served as the Tisza Party’s expert on budgetary and tax policy. In April 2026, he was offered the position of Minister of Finance in the newly formed Magyar Government, which he accepted.

== Personal life ==
He is married and has two children. He speaks English at an advanced level and Spanish and Russian at an intermediate level.
