= László Palkovics =

Hungarian politician

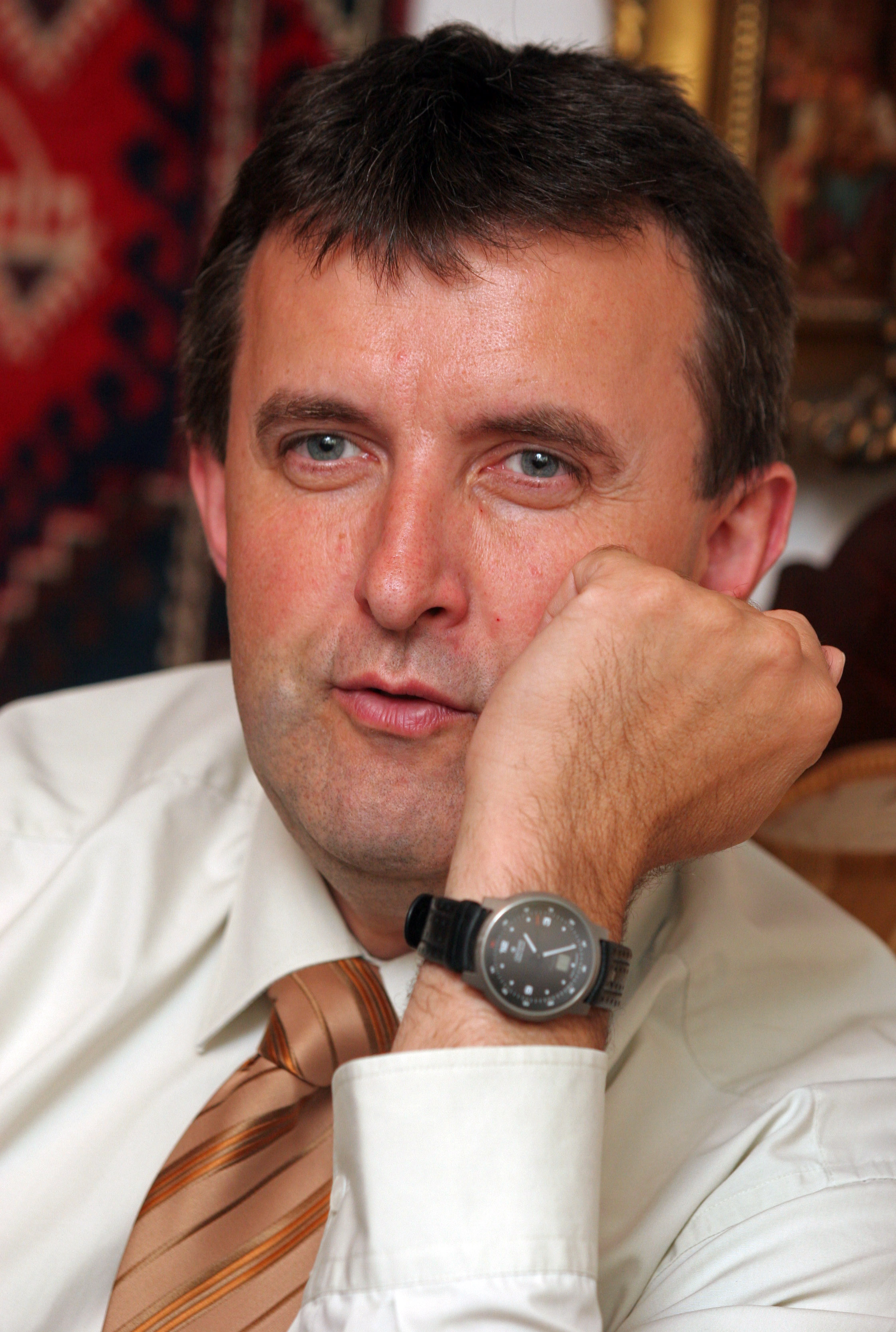
- Palkovics in 2009

Minister of Technology and Industry
- In office 24 May 2022 – 13 November 2022
- Preceded by: himself (Innovation and Technology)
- Succeeded by: Csaba Lantos (Energy)

Minister of Innovation and Technology
- In office 18 May 2018 – 24 May 2022
- Preceded by: office established
- Succeeded by: himself (Technology and Industry); János Csák (Culture and Innovation)

Secretary of State for Education
- In office 14 February 2016 – 17 May 2018
- Minister: Zoltán Balog
- Preceded by: himself (Higher Education); Judit Czunyi-Bertalan (Public Education)
- Succeeded by: József Bódis

Secretary of State for Higher Education
- In office 15 July 2014 – 14 February 2016
- Minister: Zoltán Balog
- Preceded by: István Klinghammer
- Succeeded by: himself (Education)

Personal details
- Born: 3 February 1965 (age 61) Zalaegerszeg, Hungary
- Party: non-partisan
- Profession: mechanical engineer, politician

László Palkovics (born 3 February 1965) is a Hungarian politician. He served as Minister for Innovation and Technology from 18 May 2018 to 24 May 2022, then as Minister of Technology and Industry since 24 May 2022 in the fourth and fifth cabinets of Viktor Orbán, respectively. Previously he functioned Secretary of State for Higher Education from 2014 to 2016 and Secretary of State for Education from 2016 to 2018 within the Ministry of Human Resources under minister Zoltán Balog, in the Third Orbán Government.

== Career ==
Palkovics has been Minister for Innovation and Technology since May 2018, and previously Undersecretary of State for Education. As Government Commissioner, he is responsible for the development of the Debrecen Automotive Centre, the participation of Hungary in the manufacture of autonomous vehicles, the construction of the Zalaegerszeg Test Track and the formulation of the concept of the ELI Science Park in Szeged.

Earlier, he worked at Knorr-Bremse from 1995: initially, he was development director of the research and development institute of the Hungarian subsidiary, the director for electronic development in Europe of the company in Germany between 2001 and 2003, then he was appointed European research and system development director in 2003.

His fields of research are the dynamics and stability of motor vehicles, controlled motor vehicle systems, smart vehicle and road systems, and applied control theory.

In 1996, he was elected founding secretary general of the Hungarian Automotive Association and became chairman of the National Technical Development Committee in 2001.

He has been teaching at the Budapest University of Technology and Economics since 1992. He was head of the Department of Motor Vehicles of the Faculty of Transport Engineering between 1994 and 2002 and head of the Department of Motor Vehicles and Vehicle Manufacturing since 2013. He held the position of deputy rector for strategy at the College of Kecskemét between 2009 and 2012.

He has been a research fellow at the Institute for Computer Science and Control of the Hungarian Academy of Sciences since 2000 and a research professor at Széchenyi István University since 2010. He was a doctor of the Hungarian Academy of Sciences from 1998 and its corresponding member from 2006, then he has been its ordinary member since 2013.

He received the Széchenyi Prize in 2001, the International Dennis Gabor Award in 2009 and the Bánki Donát Award in 2009. He received the Officer Cross of the Hungarian Order of Merit in 2013.

He speaks four languages.

He served in the Fifth Orbán Government as Minister of Technology and Industry. He resigned his post on 9 November 2022, after Orbán supported the establishment of a separate Ministry of Energy, diminishing the scope of his commission. His Ministry was dissolved, his tasks were delegated to ministers Márton Nagy, János Lázár, János Csák, and Csaba Lantos (as the head of the aforementioned Ministry of Energy).
