= Ministry for National Economy (Hungary) =

Government minister of Hungary

The Ministry for National Economy (Nemzetgazdasági Minisztérium) is a Hungarian Ministry of the Fifth Orbán Government since 1 January 2024, and the successor to the Ministry of Economic Development. A Ministry under the same name had previously operated between 2010 and 2018 in Hungary as well. It is led by the Minister for National Economy, Márton Nagy.

== History ==
The Ministry for National Economy was established in 2010 by decree of the Hungarian Government, replacing the former Ministry of Finance.

With the formation of the fourth Orbán government in May 2018, the Ministry of Finance took over the responsibilities of the Ministry for National Economy, which was thus abolished by decree.

Effective from 1 January 2024, the Ministry of Economic Development continues its expanded activities under a new name, the Ministry for National Economy. The Ministry of Economic Development was originally established on 1 January 2023.

As of 31 December 2024, the Ministry of Finance was merged into the Ministry for National Economy, with the latter being responsible for public finance and economic development.

== Duties and responsibilities ==
The Ministry for National Economy is mainly responsible for:

- economic development
- economic and legal framework for competitiveness
- national financial services
- regulation of the money, capital and insurance markets
- international financial relations
- regulation of the management of public assets
- supervision of public assets
- housing policy
- postal services
- domestic economy
- employment policy
- industrial affairs
- social dialogue
- enterprise development
- technology and space industry development
- tourism
- hospitality
- domestic trade
- consumer protection
- definition of strategic directions for defence industrial development
- promotion of foreign investment by domestic companies
- employment of third-country nationals in Hungary

Since 1 January 2025, the Ministry for National Economy is also responsible for the following new areas (formerly part of the Ministry of Finance):

- tax policy
- public finance
- macroeconomic underpinning of the budget
- regulation of accounting
- state aids for housing
- regulation of health insurance contributions
- regulation of pension contributions and pension insurance contributions
- pension policy

Since the summer of 2024, the Ministry for National Economy exercises direct ownership rights in Budapest Airport, Debrecen Airport and N7 Holding, and indirect ownership rights in HungaroControl.

Since February 2025, the ministry is responsible for gambling regulation and the supervision of concession rights. Until the end of 2026, it also exercises the ownership rights of Hungarian national gambling organizer company Szerencsejáték Zrt.

== Organisation ==
=== Minister for National Economy (2024–) ===
- Márton Nagy

=== State Secretaries ===
- János Fónagy, Parliamentary State Secretary, Deputy Minister
- Anikó Túri, State Secretary for Public Administration
- Máté Lóga, State Secretary for Economic Development and Industry
- Sándor Czomba, State Secretary for Employment Policy
- Richárd Szabados, State Secretary for SME Development, Technology and Defense Industry
- Bence Gerlaki, State Secretary for Tax Policy, Consumer Protection and Trade
- Kornél Kisgergely, State Secretary for Public Finances
- Ferenc Vágujhelyi, State Secretary for the Management of the National Tax and Customs Administration
