= Northwood School (Lake Placid, New York) =

Private school in New York, US

Coordinates: 44°17′33.57″N 73°58′14.17″W

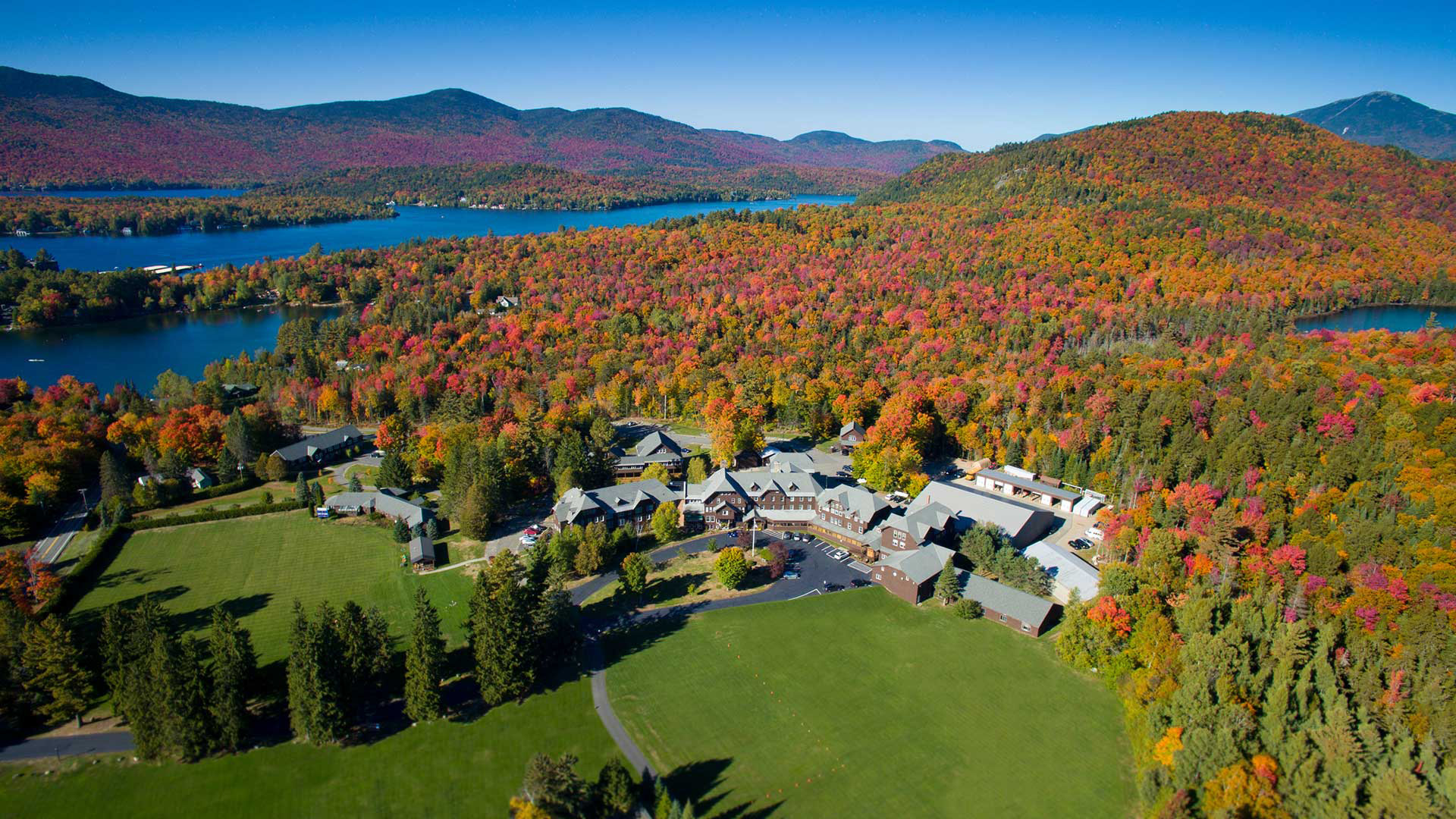
- Aerial View of Northwood School.

Location
- 92 Northwood Rd. Lake Placid, New York 12946; United States

Information
- Type: Co-ed, Private, Boarding and Day school
- Motto: "Strength through Health and Knowledge"
- Established: 1905
- Founder: John M. Hopkins
- CEEB code: 332760
- Head of School: Gino Riffle
- Faculty: 43
- Grades: 9-12, PG
- Enrollment: 193 students; 82% Boarding (2018)
- International students: 22 Countries (2018)
- Average class size: 10
- Student to teacher ratio: 4.5:1
- Campus: 85 acres (340,000 m^{2})
- Colors: Blue and White
- Athletics: 16 interscholastic sports offered
- Mascot: Huskies
- Newspaper: The Mirror
- Yearbook: Epitome
- Endowment: $10 Million
- Website: www.northwoodschool.org

Northwood School is an independent co-educational boarding and day school for grades 9 through 12 located in Lake Placid, New York, in the heart of the Adirondack Mountains.

== History ==
=== 1905–1927: Founding and early years ===
In 1905 John M. Hopkins, a Yale graduate who had previously taught at The Hill School and the Florida-Adirondack School (later Ransom Everglades School), established a school in Lake Placid described as, “organized with quarters in the Adirondacks in the summer and in Florida in the winter. The school will furnish a home in which boys may have careful personal attention, the advantages of experienced teachers and wholesome natural outdoor life and amusements.” During this time the school was known variously as Hopkins School, Lake Placid School, and Lake Placid Boys School. Hopkins led the school until 1921 and oversaw its growth from six students to forty. By the time of Hopkins's departure the school was described as being, “...remarkably successful not only in the records of its boys in entrance examinations, but in their after careers in college.”

Herbert L. Malcolm, another Yale graduate, took over leadership of the school in 1921 and served as headmaster until 1925. The school had for years enjoyed a close relationship with the Lake Placid Club, which had been founded by Melvil Dewey, creator of the Dewey Decimal System, in 1895. Many of the students’ families were members of the club and the school utilized club grounds and buildings. In 1925, the Lake Placid Club Education Foundation took over formal control of the school.

This transition brought the arrival of Robert W. Boyden as the school's new headmaster and also marked the end of the school's annual winter migration to Florida in order to, "secure continuity of educational effort and also to enrich the school life by the varied winter sports available for physical development."

=== 1927–1944: Becoming Northwood ===
In 1927, Dr. Ira A. Flinner, who received his doctorate from Harvard, was appointed headmaster, a position he would hold until 1951. Early in his tenure the school moved to its present location and adopted a new name, Northwood School. Under Flinner, Northwood continued to expand its physical plant and increase enrollment.

In 1934 Northwood School received its charter by the Regents of the State of New York, and was made a not for profit institution governed by a board of trustees.

=== 1944–45: Hiatus ===
In the summer of 1944, the U.S. Army took over control of Northwood's buildings for use as a medical unit within the redeployment center in Lake Placid, New York. The school was closed until the U.S. Army relinquished control of the buildings. In the fall of 1946, Northwood reopened.

=== 1946–1965: Re-opening and changes ===
Moreau C. Hunt became headmaster in 1951. John G. Howard took over for him in 1954. Howard brought updates to the school buildings and new courses in public speaking and debate. Under Howard, the school newspaper, The Mirror, was elevated in stature and became a more formal and regularly released publication.

=== 1965–2015: Continued growth, coeducation ===
In 1965, Edward C. Welles became headmaster. He was soon followed by W. John Friedlander in 1967, who served as the school's headmaster until 1996. Friedlander oversaw the school's continued expansion and its transition into a coeducational institution. Female students were first formally enrolled as day students in 1971, and then as boarding students in 1972. Edward M. Good took over as Northwood's headmaster in 1997.

=== 2015–present ===
In 2015, Michael J. Maher, formerly Head of Berkshire School, followed Good as Northwood’s Head of School. Ten years later, in 2025, Gino Riffle—once Northwood’s Director of Admissions—stepped into the position, continuing the school’s tradition of strong leadership.

== Notable alumni ==
- Blake Bolden, professional ice hockey player
- Craig Conroy, professional ice hockey player
- Sam Faber, professional ice hockey player
- Tony Granato, professional ice hockey player
- Martin Hyun, writer and professional ice hockey player
- Andrea Kilbourne-Hill, Olympic ice hockey player
- Konstanze Krüger, German zoologist
- Kenji Mboma Dem, professional soccer player
- Tom Mellor, professional ice hockey player
- Edward Platt, actor best known for playing ”The Chief” in the television show, Get Smart
- Mike Richter, professional ice hockey player
- Kelley Steadman, professional ice hockey player
- Andrew Weibrecht, world cup and Olympic ski racer
- Steven Zalewski, professional ice hockey player
