= Márton Nagy =

Hungarian politician

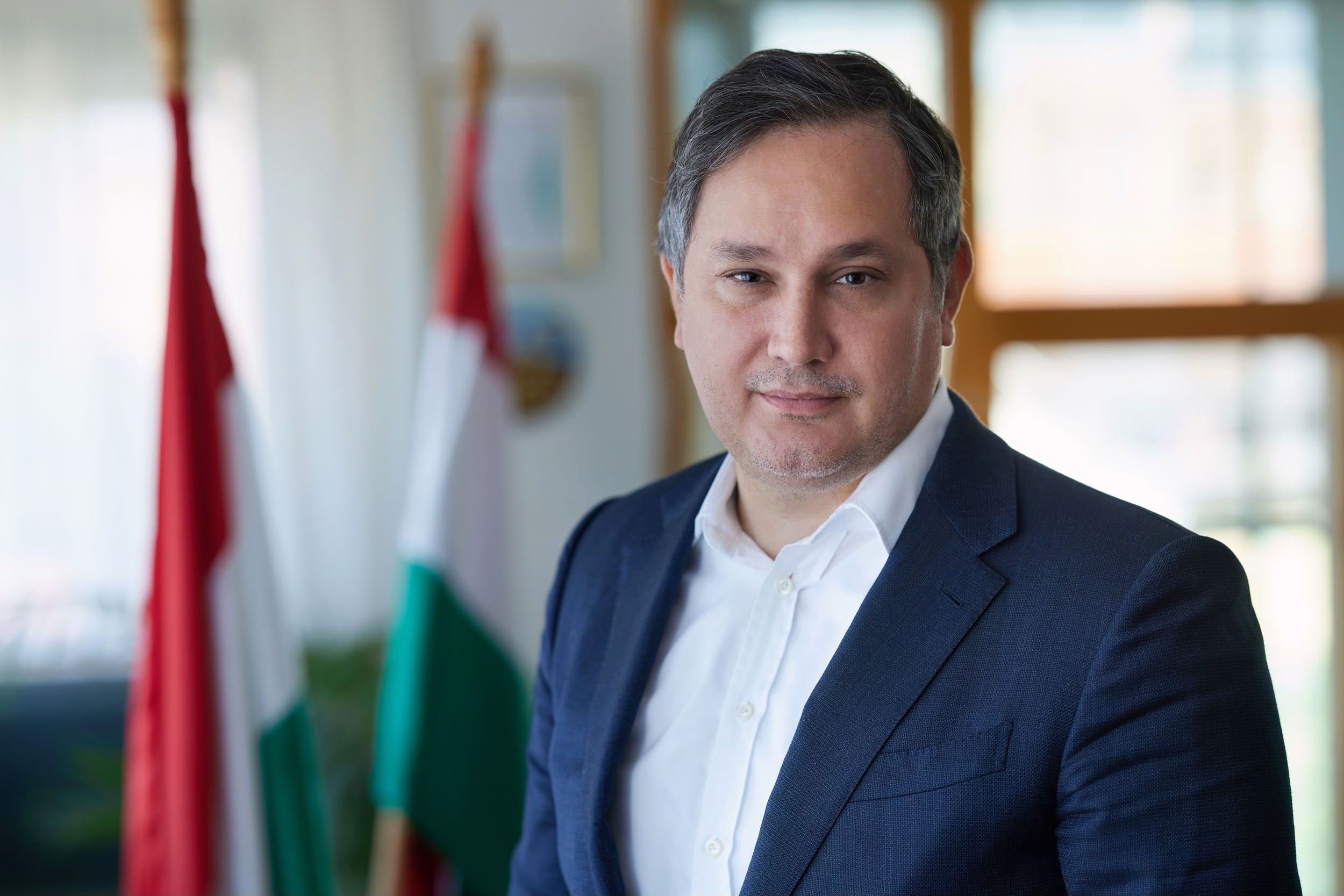
- Nagy in 2023

Minister for National Economy
- In office 24 May 2022 – 9 May 2026
- Prime Minister: Viktor Orbán
- Preceded by: Himself (as Minister of Economic Development)
- Succeeded by: András Kármán (as Minister of Finance); István Kapitány (as Minister of Economy and Energy)

Personal details
- Born: Márton István Nagy; 9 May 1976 (age 50) Szolnok, Hungary
- Education: Budapest University of Economics
- Profession: Economist, politician

Márton István Nagy (born 9 May 1976) is a former Minister for National Economy of Hungary. He previously served as Minister of Economic Development between May 2022 and December 2023, and before that as the Prime Minister's Chief Economic Adviser in the Prime Minister's Office in the fourth Orbán Government from 2020 to April 2022. Between 2015 and 2020 he was Deputy Governor of the Hungarian National Bank (MNB), and the Chairman of the Budapest Stock Exchange from 2015 to 2017.

== Early life and education ==
He was born in Szolnok on 9 May 1976. He graduated in 1999 from the Budapest University of Economics.

== Early career (1998-2015) ==
He worked as a macroeconomic analyst at Government Debt Management Agency between 1998 and 2000, and as a senior analyst at ING Asset Management Ltd. from 2000 to 2002.

He joined the Hungarian National Bank in 2002, where he served as a senior economic expert (2002–2006), later as a deputy head (2006–2010) and as a director (2010–2013). He was the bank's Executive Director for Financial Stability and Lending Stimulus from 2013 to 2015.

Between 2012 and 2015, he also served as a member of the Financial Stability Council and the European Banking Authority.

== Deputy Governor of the Hungarian National Bank (2015-2020) ==
Between 2015 and 2020, he was Deputy Governor of the Hungarian National Bank and a member of the Monetary Council, while at the same time chairman of the Board of the Hungarian Mint Ltd., a board member at KELER Ltd. and KELER Central Counterparty (CCP) Ltd. Between 2015 and 2016 he also served as a board member at the National Deposit Insurance Fund and the Resolution Fund.

Between December 2015 and March 2017, he also held the position of Chairman of the Budapest Stock Exchange.

He resigned from his position at the Hungarian National Bank in May 2020.

== Chief Economic Adviser to the Prime Minister (2020-2022) ==
He served as the Chief Economic Adviser to Viktor Orbán between 2020 and 2022. In addition to providing personalized advice on economic policy issues, he was also responsible for coordinating various branches of economic policy.

Between 1 May 2021 and 30 April 2023, he was a member of the supervisory board and of the Audit Committee of MOL Plc.

== Minister of Economic Development (2022 - 2023) ==
He was appointed as Minister of Economic Development without Portfolio in May 2022. He served as the Minister of the Ministry of Economic Development between 1 January 2023 and 31 December 2023. He was mainly responsible for economic development, the economic and legal framework for competitiveness, national financial services, regulation of the money, capital and insurance markets, international financial relations, regulation of the management of public assets, supervision of public assets, housing policy, postal services, the domestic economy, employment policy, industrial affairs, social dialogue and enterprise development.

As Minister, he has so far been responsible for, among other things, the purchase of Vodafone Hungary, the launch of the Baross Gábor Reindustrialization Loan Program and the Baross Gábor Capital Program, and the joint negotiations with commercial banks on the voluntary interest rate cap.

He was appointed to lead the Cabinet for Economic Affairs from 7 December 2023. As leader of the Cabinet, he has executive powers in areas such as tax policy, rural development, agricultural policy, public finance, public investment, supervision of public assets, macroeconomic underpinning of the budget, regulation of the management of public assets, the domestic economy and energy policy, industrial affairs, food industry, food chain supervision, regulation of pension contributions and pension insurance premiums, pension policy, foreign economic affairs, gambling regulation, national utilities, the planning, construction and commissioning of the two new units of the Paks nuclear power plant, and economic development.

== Minister for National Economy (2024-2026) ==
From 1 January 2024, the Ministry of Economic Development continues its expanded activities under its new name, the Ministry for National Economy. Márton Nagy is leading the Ministry as Minister for National Economy who, in addition to his responsibilities as Minister for Economic Development, in December 2023 he was given the task of overseeing five new areas - space industry development, tourism, hospitality, domestic trade and the employment of third-country nationals in Hungary.

From 1 August 2024, the responsibilities of Márton Nagy were extended further to include areas such as space technology, consumer protection, the definition of strategic directions for defence industrial development, the promotion of foreign investment by domestic companies, and the exercising of ownership rights of Debrecen International Airport.

On 31 December 2024, the Ministry of Finance was abolished by merging into the Ministry for National Economy. From the beginning of 2025, Márton Nagy acts as the Hungarian government's top minister for economic affairs.

In February 2025, the ministry took over responsibility for gambling regulation and the supervision of concession rights. Until the end of 2026, it will also exercise the ownership rights of Hungarian national gambling organizer company Szerencsejáték Zrt.

As Minister for National Economy, he has taken an active role in the development of the 2024-2030 competitiveness strategy, in the reduction of fuel prices, in the retail mortgage interest rate freeze, in promoting the green transition, including the battery industry and electric vehicles, in the development of the anti-war action plan, the establishment and leadership of the National ESG Council and in the governance of the National Trade and Consumer Authority (established on 1 January 2025). He is also leading the implementation of the New Economic Policy Action Plan, which consists of three pillars and 21 measures, including the Demján Sándor Program – named after the late Hungarian businessman Sándor Demján, its aim is to double the size of Hungarian businesses and to further strengthen the Hungarian SMEs. He was also in charge of the negotiations about the ownership of Budapest Airport Ltd, which was acquired by the Hungarian Government and Vinci Airports on 6 June 2024.
