= Nürtingen-Geislingen University of Applied Science =

Public university in Germany

Coordinates: 48°37′38″N 9°20′15″E

University of Applied Science Nuertingen-Geislingen
- University of Nürtingen-Geislingen
- Type: Public
- Established: 1949
- Rector: Prof. Dr. Andreas Frey
- Academic staff: 125
- Students: 5.226 (academic year 23/24)
- Location: Nuertingen, Baden-Württemberg, Germany
- Website: www.HfWU.de

The Nürtingen-Geislingen University (German: Hochschule für Wirtschaft und Umwelt Nürtingen-Geislingen) is a public university of applied sciences based in Nürtingen and Geislingen an der Steige, Baden-Wuerttemberg, Germany.

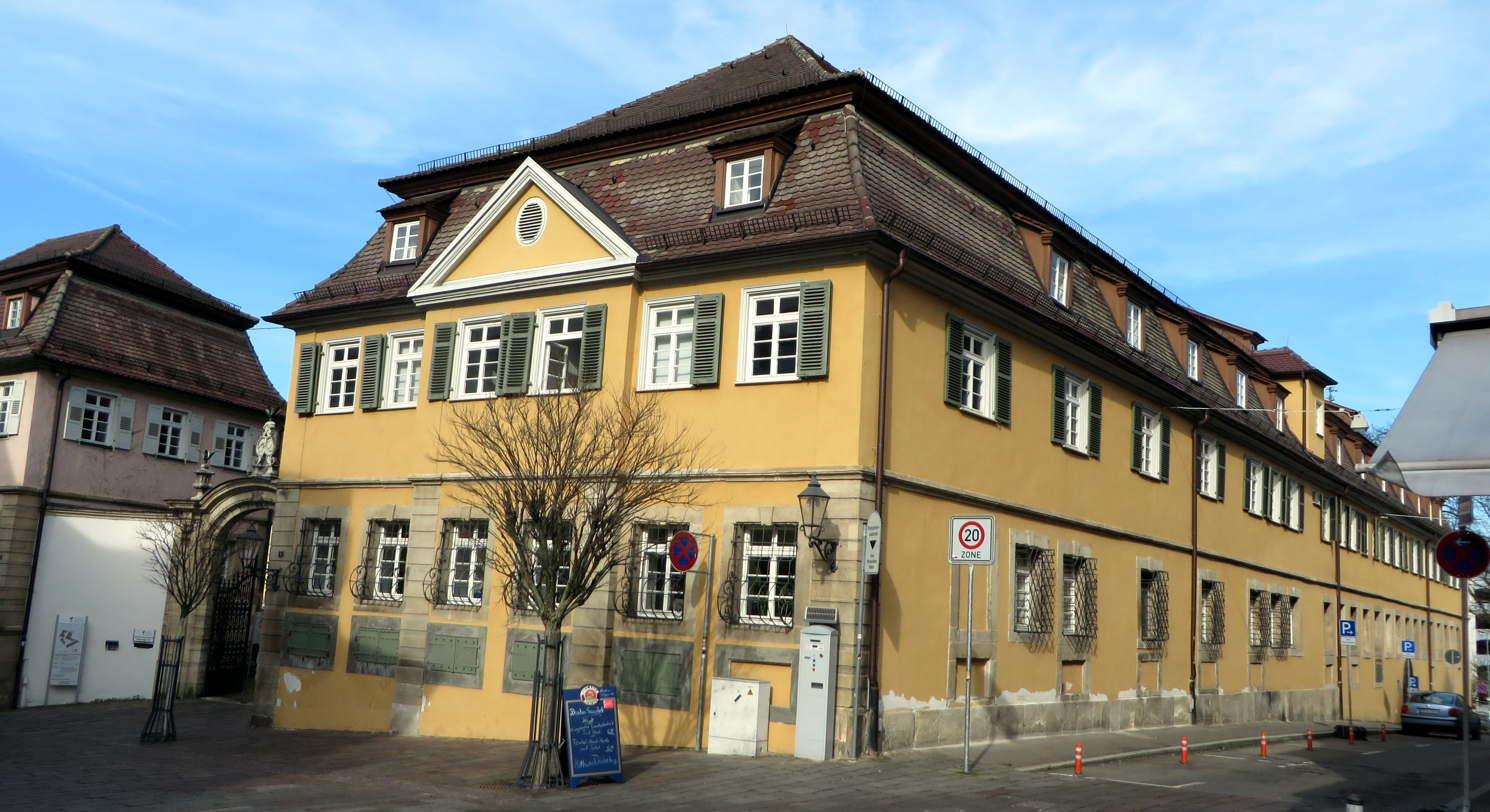
Domicile of the university and the Faculty of Agriculture, National Economics and Management.

== History ==
The „Höhere Landbauschule“ (Higher Agricultural College) was founded in 1949, but the name was later changed to School of Agricultural Engineering. A statute of the 6th of February 1972 integrated it into the University of Applied Science of Nuertingen. Nuertingen University originally offered courses in Agriculture, Business Economics and Landscape Maintenance and in 1988 built a second facility in Geislingen an der Steige with courses in Automotive Industry, Economic Law, Health and Tourist Management and Energy and Recycling Management.

In the frame of the Bologna Process for Internationalisation of Professional Qualifications all Diploma courses were transformed into Bachelor courses.

In 2009, all activities in the area of "International Finance“ were consolidated into the European School of Finance (ESF). This embraced the Bachelor course “International Finance Management” and the Masters course “International Finance” together with all teaching and research activities.

On 24 April 2012, the College and the affiliated “European Institute for Financial Engineering and Related Research” (EIFD) received the Educational Award of the Education Foundation.

== Faculties ==
- Faculty of Business of Economics and International Finance:
- Faculty of Agribusiness, National Economics and Management:
- Faculty of Landscape Architecture, Environment- and Town Planning:
- Faculty of Economics and Law:

== Notable professors and alumni ==
- Andreas Frey (born 1967), German economic scientist und Rector (2013- )
- Konstanze Krüger (born 1968), German zoologist and behavioral scientist
- Manfred G. Raupp (born 1941), German agricultural scientist and economist
- Judit Varga (born 1980), Hungarian politician and Minister of Justice (2019–2023)
