= Balázs Hankó =

Hungarian politician (born 1978)

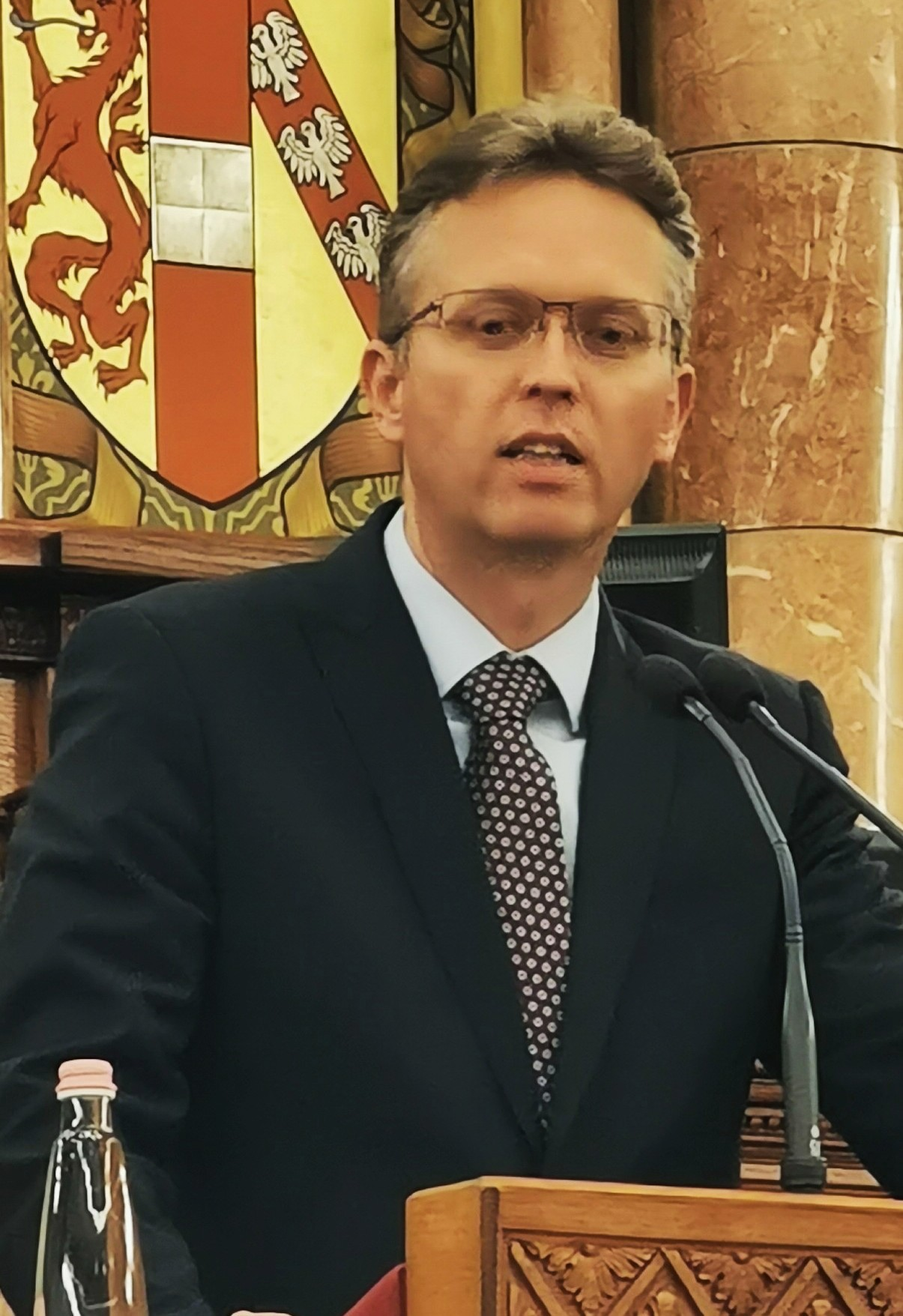
- Hankó in 2025

Minister of Culture and Innovation
- In office 1 July 2024 – 12 May 2026
- Prime Minister: Viktor Orbán
- Preceded by: János Csák
- Succeeded by: Zoltan Tarr (as Minister of Social Relations and Culture)

Personal details
- Born: 20 March 1978 (age 48)
- Party: Fidesz (since 2025)

Balázs Hankó (born 20 March 1978) is a Hungarian politician who served as minister of culture and innovation between 2024 and 2026.

From 2022 to 2024, he served as secretary of state for higher education, vocational training, continuing education and innovation at the Ministry of Culture and Innovation.

In 2026 he was awarded the Order of the Serbian Flag.

Hankó was elected a Member of Parliament via the national list of Fidesz–KDNP during the 2026 Hungarian parliamentary election. He became a vice-chairman of the parliament's Committee of Education. Following the election, Hankó's role in the election came under scrutiny, with news outlet Atlatszo alleging that he had distributed 17 billion Hungarian forints (equivalent to €46.6 million) to fund Fidesz campaign events and pro-Fidesz musicians in his position as head of the National Cultural Fund of Hungary (Hungarian: Nemzeti Kulturális Alap, NKA). Grants were also provided to the pro-Orbán European Conservative and Mandiner news outlets, café chain Scruton, and Férfiak Klubja, a manosphere group. Several members of the NKA board resigned after the grants were revealed, saying to news portal Telex.hu that they had been presented with "misleading" information about the nature of the grants. Following the arrest of deputy culture minister Balázs Bús for his involvement in alleged misuse of NKA grants, Hankó defended Bús, accusing the case of being politically motivated. Hankó's chief of parliamentary staff was also arrested on 23 July. Hankó himself was arrested as well on 28 September.
