= Andreas Frey =

German economist

Andreas Frey (born 5 June 1967 in Geislingen an der Steige, Germany) is a German economical scientist and Rector of the Nürtingen-Geislingen University of Applied Science (HfWU) for the period 2013 – 2019.

== Biography ==
Andreas Frey grew up in Geislingen and took „Abitur“ at the Michelberg-Gymnasium before studying at the University of Wisconsin, USA, and at the University of Ulm, where he was awarded his doctorate (Dr. rer nat.) After a post-doc at the Tokyo Institute of Technology and further research activities in the same city he returned to Germany to take up a post as a systems engineer at Siemens AG.

In 2004 he was awarded the professorship of Economic Mathematics, Statistics and Informatics at the University of Osnabrück in Germany, where he taught until 2013. He was also Dean of Education and Vice-Dean of the Faculty of Economic and Social Science, and headed a working group on „International Strategy“. Further, he was a spokesman for the Innovation Centre for Internationalisation and representative for China, organising the German-Chinese Symposium as well as China and Japan Weeks in Osnabrueck.

In April 2013 he was elected Rector of the HfWU for a period of six years, as successor of Werner Ziegler. He took office on 1 October 2013.

== Publications ==
Frey is author of more than 30 publications in German and English; he has been guest professor at the Shanghai Institute of Foreign Trade and visiting scientist at Waseda University in Japan.
