= Andrea Mager =

Hungarian politician

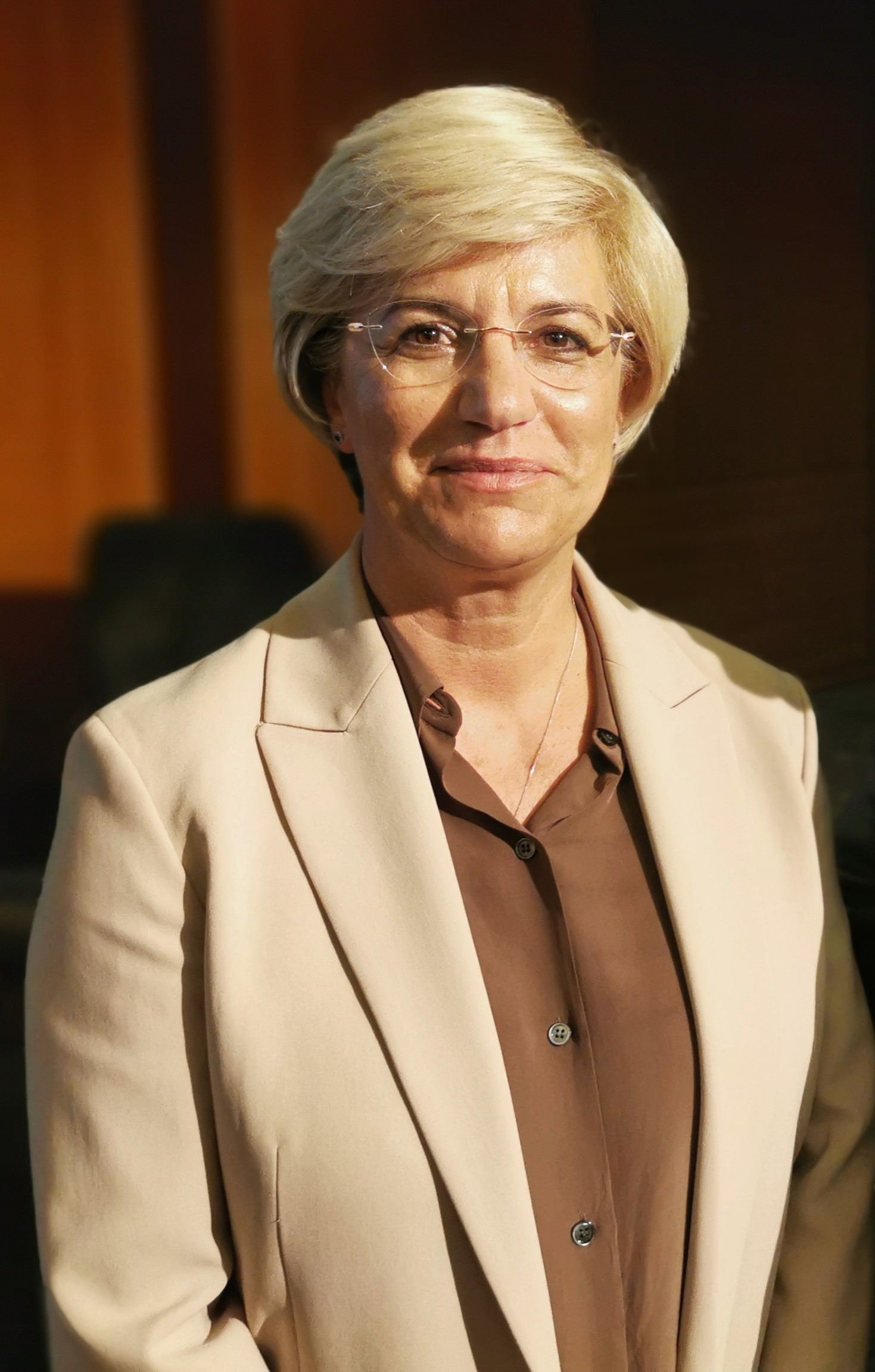

Minister without Portfolio for managing national wealth
- In office 18 May 2018 – 24 May 2022

Personal details
- Born: 24 May 1966 (age 58)
- Spouse(s): Sándor Balogh (divorced); Béla Bártfai (divorced)
- Profession: Economist

Andrea Mager( born 24 May 1966), also known as Andrea Bártfai-Mager, is a Hungarian economist, who served as the minister without portfolio for national wealth in the Fourth Orbán Government, between 18 May 2018 and 24 May 2022. Forbes named her as the most influential woman in Hungary in 2019.

== Career ==
In 1985 and 1986 Andrea Bártfai-Mager studied at the Institute on International Relations in Moscow, then she went on to the international relations faculty of Karl Marx University of Economical Sciences. She took post-graduate studies in the fields of financial management and bank relationships. She started to work for Postabank, and went to the National Bank of Hungary in 2001, where she worked until 2007. Here she had the following positions: from 2001 to 2004, she was the leader of the Banking Department, then next year she led the Financial Stability Department, and went as the vice-director of the same department.

Between 2007 and 2010, she was a member of Competition Committee of Hungarian Competition Authority. On 1 July 2010 she was appointed as the managerial director of the publishing house that publishes Magyar Közlöny. On 21 March 2011 she was elected as a member of the Monetary Committee of the Hungarian National Bank for six years. On 6 July 2016 she was appointed as governmental commissioner responsible for post and national financial affairs.

Several media sources reported that she would be appointed as the Minister for National Development in the Fourth Orbán Government; however, she was appointed as a Minister without Portfolio for managing national wealth, while the Ministry of National Development was disintegrated.

== Family ==
Her mother is Izabella Nagy, her husband is Béla Bártfai, Under-Secretary of the Chancellor's Office during the First Orbán Government.
