= Örs Farkas =

Hungarian politician (born 1988)

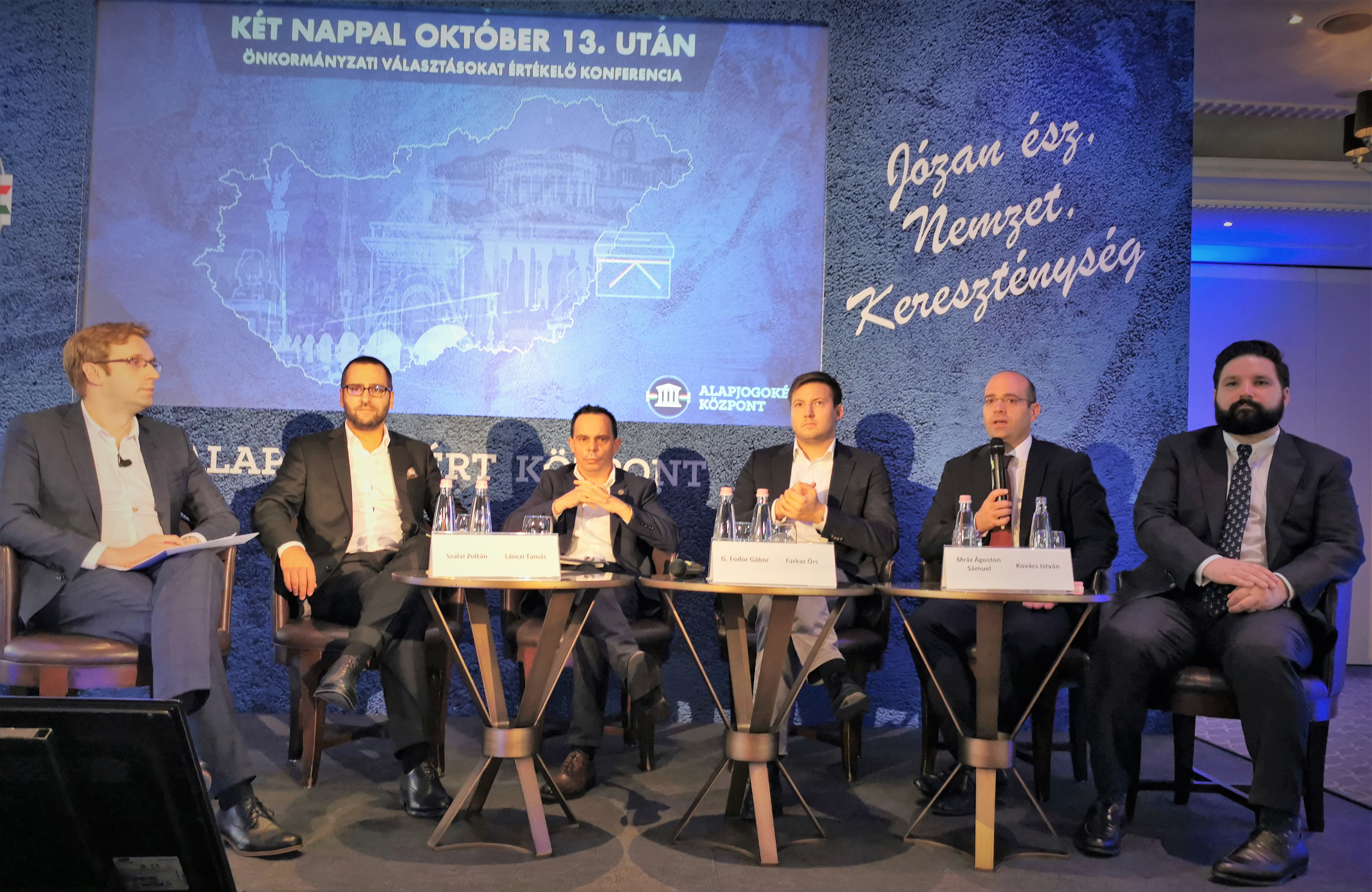
- Farkas in 2019

Member of the National Assembly
- Incumbent
- Assumed office 18 March 2024
- Preceded by: Judit Varga

Personal details
- Born: 10 July 1988 (age 37)
- Party: Fidesz

Örs Farkas (born 10 July 1988) is a Hungarian politician serving as a member of the National Assembly since 2024. He has served as state secretary of the Prime Minister's Office since 2024.
