= Orsolya Miskolczi =

Hungarian politician

Member of the National Assembly
- Assuming office 9 May 2026
- Succeeding: Bence Tuzson
- Constituency: Pest 5th

Personal details
- Party: Tisza

Orsolya Miskolczi is a Hungarian politician who was elected member of the National Assembly in 2026 representing the Pest County 5th constituency. She previously worked as a lawyer.
