= Bence Tuzson =

Hungarian politician (born 1972)

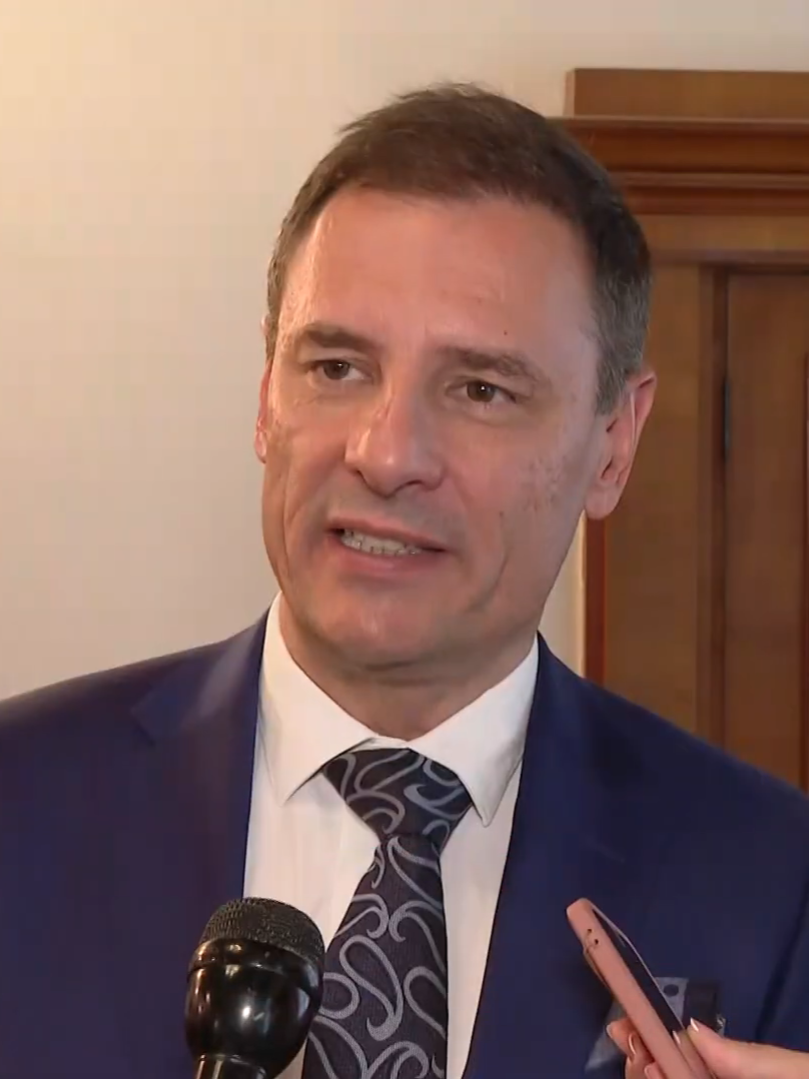
- Tuzson in 2024

Minister of Justice
- In office 1 August 2023 – 12 May 2026
- Prime Minister: Viktor Orbán
- Preceded by: Judit Varga
- Succeeded by: Márta Görög

Personal details
- Born: Bence Balázs Tuzson; 31 January 1972 (age 54)
- Party: MDF (1989–1996); MDNP (1996–1998); Fidesz (since 1998)

Bence Balázs Tuzson (born 31 January 1972) is a Hungarian politician, who served as Minister of Justice from 2023 to 2026. He has been a member of the National Assembly since 2014, and was a substitute member of the Parliamentary Assembly of the Council of Europe from 2014 to 2015.

== Early life ==
He was born on 31 January 1972 in Budapest. His mother was an architect while his father was a mechanical engineer. At the age of 17 he joined the Hungarian Democratic Forum (MDF), working as a youth policy advisor to József Antall. From 1987 to 1991 he attended Szilágyi Erzsébet Gymnasium, afterwards attending Pázmány Péter Catholic University from 1993 to 1994 in the Faculty of Humanities. During the early 90s he also became a secretary of the MDF committee in District XII, meeting Viktor Orbán at this time through various events.

He then studied at the Eötvös Loránd University from 1994 to 1999 in the Faculty of Law. While studying, he simultaneously also pursued his political career, becoming a member of the MDNP in 1996, part of Fidelitas, and vice-president of Districts I and XII. In 1997, through ACYPL, he studied in the United States of America on self-government where he became a Goodwill Ambassador of the city of Houston. In 1998, he became a municipal councillor in District XII of Budapest's municipal body representing Fidesz, a position he held until 2006 for two terms.

After he passed the bar exam in 2003, he ran his own law firm until 2014.

== Political career ==
In 2013, Tuzson became chairman of the Fidesz constituency in the 5th constituency of Pest County. In 2014 he became a member of the National Assembly. He was elected MP for Dunakeszi (5th constituency of Pest County) in the 2014, 2018 and 2022 parliamentary elections. He acted as vice-chairman of the parliament's Legislative Committee from June 2014 to November 2015.

Tuzson was appointed Secretary of State for Communications at the Prime Minister's Cabinet Office on 21 October 2015. After the formation of the Fourth Orbán Government, he became Secretary of State for Public Service at the Prime Minister's Office on 22 May 2018. He held this office until January 2020, when he was appointed Secretary of State for Governance at the Prime Minister's Cabinet Office. Beside that he was appointed government commissioner for deregulation policy in May 2022.

He became Minister of Justice after the resignation of Judit Varga in August 2023. Under his ministry, the government faced several legal scandals in which Tuzson was significantly involved. During the Hungarian Pride parade ban in the spring of 2025, he warned mayor Gergely Karácsony that he would face one year of imprisonment if he organized Budapest Pride in defiance of the ban, and he sent letters to multiple embassies notifying them that Pride was banned. During the Szőlő Street scandal, Tuzson announced his report, which was completed within two days, and states that according to the Ministry of Justice, no member of the government was involved in the Szőlő Street case and that a foreign intelligence service was likely also involved in the "unprecedented attack on the Hungarian government". On 24 September 2025, Minister of Justice Bence Tuzson published the ministerial report he had prepared at the government's request on the allegations concerning criminal proceedings at the Szőlő Street Reformatory. However, the decree authorizing the minister to prepare the report was not published in the Hungarian Gazette until 1 p.m., while Tuzson posted about it at 11:59. Tuzson listed the findings of the report, including that no minors or politicians were mentioned in the criminal case, that there was no doubt about the innocence of the ministers, and that foreign secret service involvement had also been raised in the case. According to the report, Csaba Káncz was also questioned as a witness, and he said that he had no evidence in the case and that he had obtained his statements from an influential member of a nationally-known influential political family. The report concludes that the investigation will continue in order to uncover "further connections to organized, coordinated action against the government".

Tuzson was defeated by Tisza candidate Orsolya Miskolczi in Dunakeszi constituency during the 2026 Hungarian parliamentary election, but he was elected MP via the national list of Fidesz–KDNP. He became a vice-chairman of the parliament's Committee on Justice and Constitutional Affairs.

Political offices
Preceded by Judit Varga	Minister of Justice; 2023–2026	Succeeded by Márta Görög
