= Judit Varga =

Hungarian politician (born 1980)

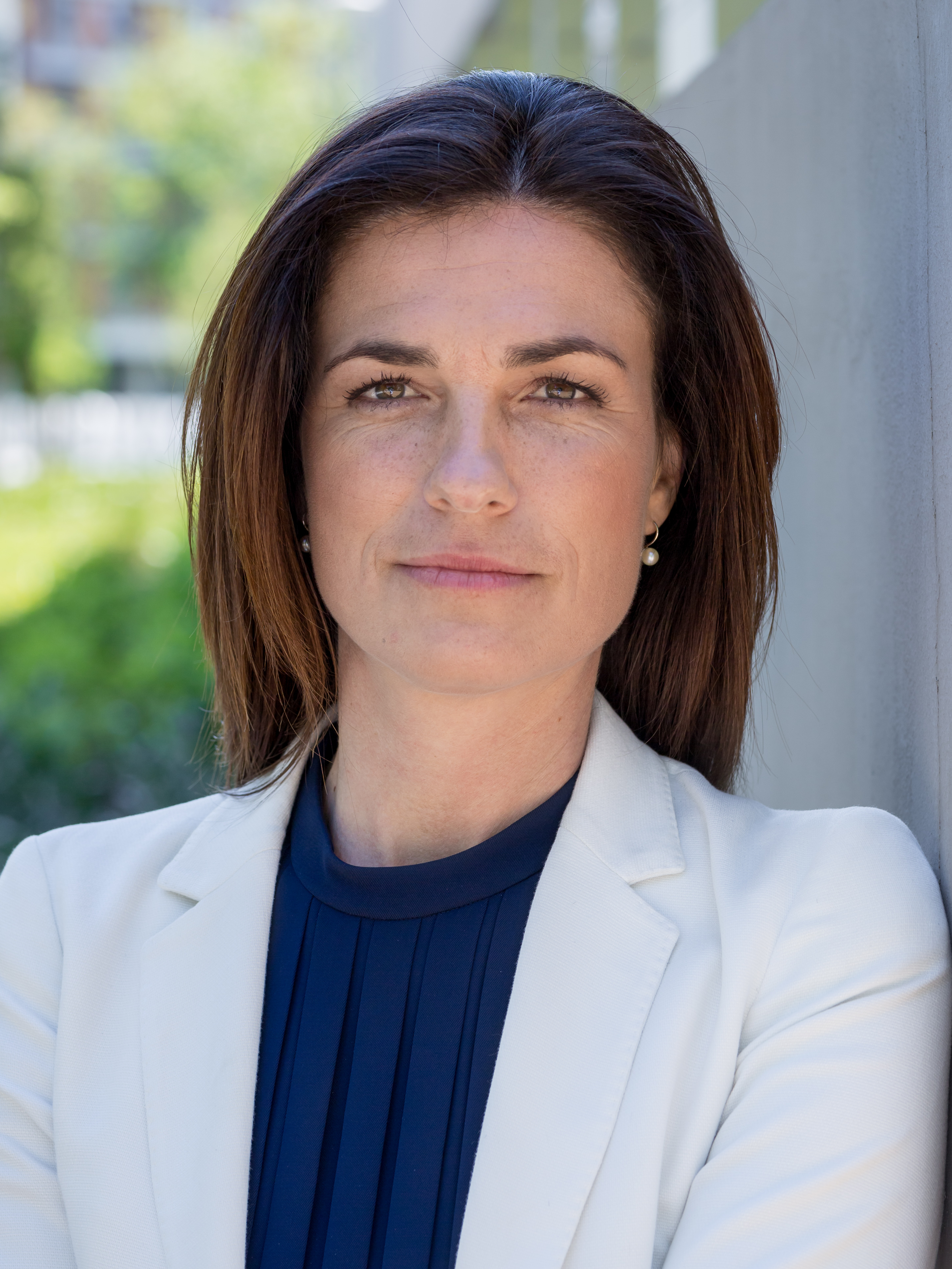
- Varga in 2020

Minister of Justice
- In office 12 July 2019 – 31 July 2023
- Prime Minister: Viktor Orbán
- Preceded by: László Trócsányi
- Succeeded by: Bence Tuzson

Member of the National Assembly
- In office 2 May 2022 – 16 February 2024
- Succeeded by: Örs Farkas

Minister of State for European Union Relations
- In office 22 May 2018 – 11 July 2019

Personal details
- Born: 10 September 1980 (age 46) Miskolc, Hungary
- Party: Fidesz
- Spouse: Péter Magyar (m. 2006; div. 2023)
- Children: 3
- Education: Nürtingen-Geislingen University of Applied Science University of Miskolc
- Occupation: Lawyer; politician

Judit Varga (Note: Hungarian pronunciation: [ˈjudit ˈvɒrgɒ]) (born 10 September 1980) is a Hungarian lawyer and retired politician who served as Minister of Justice of Hungary from her appointment in July 2019, until her resignation in June 2023. In the 2022 Hungarian parliamentary election, she was elected to the National Assembly.

== Early life, education, and early career ==
Varga was born on 10 September 1980 in Miskolc, Hungary. In 2003, she graduated summa cum laude from the University of Miskolc with a judicial degree. Over the next five years, she worked in Budapest as a trainee associate at Freshfields Bruckhaus Deringer and at Hogan & Hartson, and as a judicial law clerk at the Metropolitan Court of Budapest. She passed the Hungarian bar exam in 2009.

From 2009 to 2018, Varga worked as policy advisor to Members of the European Parliament from Hungary, including János Áder, Erik Bánki, and György Hölvényi. Varga served as Minister of State for European Union Relations in the Prime Minister of Hungary's Office from June 2018 until her appointment as Minister of Justice of Hungary.

== Minister of Justice of Hungary ==
Prime Minister of Hungary Viktor Orbán appointed Varga to the office of Minister of Justice of Hungary on 12 July 2019. In 2021, she filed a case in the Court of Justice of the European Union challenging the legality of a mechanism that would allow the European Commission to deny member states financial aid, they would otherwise be entitled to receive, for rule-of-law violations.

== National Assembly ==
Varga served on the Committee on European Affairs, which she chaired. On 2 February 2024, it became known to the public that in April 2023, Katalin Novák, the president of Hungary, had pardoned Endre Kónya during a visit by Pope Francis—as Kónya was under house arrest, with nine months remaining on his sentence. Kónya was the former deputy director of an orphanage in Bicske who had been convicted in 2019 of and was serving a prison term for coercion for trying to cover up child molestation at the institution. Varga, who was Minister of Justice at the time, had—as constitutionally required—to also countersign the clemency document for it to become a valid pardon. The pardon's revelation created a scandal. As a result, Novák and Varga both resigned on 10 February. Varga had been considered to lead the Fidesz list in the 2024 European Parliament election.

== Personal life ==
Varga married Péter Magyar in 2006; he was at the time a member of Fidesz. They have three children. The couple divorced in March 2023. She speaks Hungarian, English, German, French, and Spanish.

=== Schadl–Völner case ===
On 20 March 2024, Magyar testified for several hours at the Metropolitan Prosecutor's Office regarding the high-profile corruption case involving President of the Court Bailiffs György Schadl over bribes paid to former Secretary of State for Justice Pál Völner. Shortly after his testimony, he announced to the press that he had proof in the form of audio recordings that Cabinet Minister Antal Rogán or his associates had manipulated documents in the case in order to hide evidence that would have incriminated Rogán. In a Facebook post a few days later, he promised to make the recordings public at 9 am on 26 March 2024, the date of his next appointment to testify and present the evidence to the prosecutors. He wrote that once this happened, Chief Prosecutor Péter Polt as well as the entire Orbán government would have no choice but to resign.

On 26 March, Magyar released a secretly recorded, two-minute discussion between him and his ex-wife Varga in 2023 about the Schadl-Völner corruption case. Varga's comments apparently implicated Rogán in tampering with evidence by having his and/or his associates' names removed from documents associated with the case. He turned the recording over to prosecutors.

=== Abuse allegations against Péter Magyar ===
The same day that Péter Magyar leaked the recording on which Varga discussed Rogán's role in the Schadl–Völner case, Varga published two posts on Facebook alleging that Magyar had verbally and physically abused her throughout their marriage. She also claimed that the statements she made on the leaked recording had been coerced during an interaction with Magyar in which she felt threatened.

Later that evening, the YouTube channel Frizbi TV released an interview with Varga in which she went into more detail about her allegations. She said that at various times Magyar had locked her in a room without her consent, pushed her against a door while she was pregnant, and walked around their shared residence brandishing a knife; once he faked suicide, but when the ambulance arrived, he drove off in his pyjamas and Varga had to send the medics off.

Magyar called the accusations slander and said Varga was being blackmailed by the government. According to him, the government media wanted to divert attention from the audio recording by committing character assassination against him.

According to a released police report, Magyar behaved aggressively, intimidating and threatening towards his wife and his environment, when she attempted to take away their children with the help of police officers who were bodyguards due to Varga's job. Magyar was threatening Varga to create a scandal that would overthrow the government. They had a heated argument at their home, and drove erratically to a second home where the children were present. He tried to record the events on his phone, but was stopped by the police. In the end, Magyar went home, and Varga took the children to their grandparents. Magyar said the police report was falsified.

In July 2025, Varga repeated her accusations, and claimed that her ex-husband was a traitor.

== Notes ==
Political offices
Preceded by László Trócsányi	Minister of Justice; 2019–2023	Succeeded by Bence Tuzson
