= Konstanze Krüger =

German zoologist and behaviour researcher

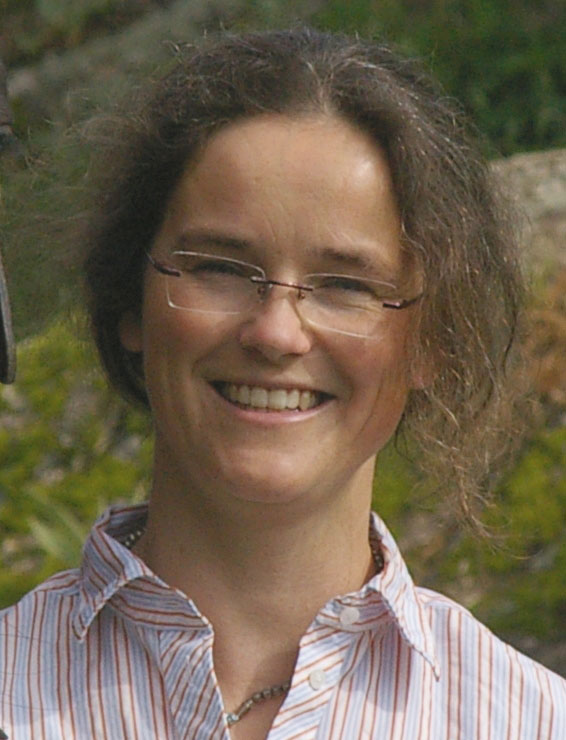
- Born: Cologne
- Education: LMU Munich; University of Regensburg
- Scientific career
- Fields: Zoology & Agriculture
- Workplaces: Nürtingen-Geislingen University of Applied Science

Konstanze Krüger-Farrouj (née Konstanze Deubner, born 22 January 1968) is a German zoologist and behaviour researcher. She is Professor of Horse Management at Nürtingen-Geislingen University of Applied Science, and her special field of research is the social system of horses.

== Scientific career ==
Krüger studied veterinary medicine at LMU Munich. After completing her studies in 1996, she accepted a position as scientific assistant at the Institute for Animal Anatomy and Histology at LMU Munich.

From April 1999 to February 2006, she ran the Einthal Equestrian Park in Obertraubling, together with her husband. From June 2004, she held a research position at Biology 1 in the department of Zoology at the University of Regensburg, researching social learning and social cognition in horses. In October 2008 she organised the 1st International Equine Science Meeting. On 1 March 2012, she became Germany's first Professor of Horse Management, taking charge of the department at the Nürtingen-Geislingen University of Applied Science. In March 2012, she organised the 2nd International Equine Science Meeting at the University of Regensburg, sponsored by the DFG. In October 2012, she was promoted to the position of Professor of Zoology at the University of Regensburg.

== Research focus ==
- Social cognition in horses
- Social ecology of horses
- Innovative Behaviour in horse

== Methods ==
- Longterm field Studies
- Social Network Analysis
- Hierarchy Calculations
- Behaviour Test

== Practical application of research in equestrian sport and horse management ==
- Behaviour of horses in the "round pen technique"

The behaviour of horses in the Join-Up-Method is a learned response specific to a particular location, and not a natural "language" as claimed by Monty Roberts in his books. The research explains how and why this training can be generalised to other people and places and therefore be an important tool in the training of horses.

- Horse sense: social status of horses (Equus caballus) affects their likelihood of copying other horses

This research supports the opinion of many equestrian experts that it is wise to use an experienced horse to demonstrate new exercises to horses in training. It also reveals that only horses from the same social group are suitable demonstrators.

- Visual laterality in the domestic horse (Equus caballus) interacting with humans

According to the situation, horses sometimes prefer to observe things with their left eye, and sometimes with the right. For every day training purposes, it is best to allow horses to observe a potentially dangerous object with its left eye until it calms down.

- Third-party interventions keep social partners from exchanging affiliative interactions with others

This study demonstrates that it is important when keeping horses in groups to ensure that the groups are composed of horses of mixed ages.

== Scientific importance of the research ==
For the last 30 years, horses have been described as being incapable of demonstrating social learning (Baer et al. 1983.; Baker and Crawford 1986; Clarke et al. 1996; Lindberg et al. 1999) because the social complexity of horses was underestimated and the experimental designs were therefore not suitably constructed. In several studies this was taken into account, and for the first time horses did show social learning. This has important implications for other species in which social learning has similarly not been shown. The experimental design for these species should now be reconsidered and new experiments conducted in which the social aspects of the species are taken into account.

== Publications ==
=== Key publications in peer-reviewed journals ===
- Krueger, K., Flauger, B., Farmer, K., & Hemelrijk, C. (2014). Movement initiation in groups of feral horses. Behav. Process., 103, 91–101.
- Krueger K, Farmer K, Heinze J (2013) The effects of age, rank and neophobia on social learning in horses. Anim. Cogn 17, 645-655
- Schneider, G.; Krueger, K. (2012) Third-party interventions keep social partners from exchanging affiliative interactions with others Anim. Behav. 83 377–387.
- Krueger, K; Farmer, K. (2011) Laterality in the Horse [Lateralität beim Pferd ] mup 4 160–167.
- Krueger, K.; Flauger, B.; Farmer, K.; Maros, K. (2011) Horses (Equus caballus) use human local enhancement cues and adjust to human attention Anim. Cogn. 14 187–201.
- Farmer, K.; Krueger, K.; Byrne, R. (2010) Visual laterality in the domestic horse (Equus caballus) interacting with humans Anim. Cogn. 13 229–238.
- Krueger, K.;Heinze, J. (2008) Horse sense: social status of horses (Equus caballus) affects their likelihood of copying other horses' behavior Anim. Cogn. 11 431–439.
- Krueger, K.; Flauger, B. (2008) Social feeding decisions in horses (Equus caballus) Behav. Process. 78 76–83.
- Krueger, K.; Flauger, B. (2007) Social learning in horses from a novel perspective Behav. Process. 76 37–39.
- Krueger, K. (2007) Behaviour of horses in the "round pen technique" Appl. Anim. Behav. Sci. 104 162–170.

=== Books ===
- Trainingslehre Für Dressurpferde
- Das Pferd im Blickpunkt der Wissenschaft

=== Articles in specialist publications ===
Krueger K. 2008–2009. Journal Bayerns Pferde Zucht und Sport,

- Der Linksdrall: Sensorische Einseitigkeit bei Pferden 2008, 10, pp. 66–68
- Pferdeverhalten: So integriere ich mein Pferd in die Herde. 2008, 12, pp. 64–69
- Das Sozialsystem des Pferdes: Das Know-how für den täglichen Umgang. 2009, 1, pp. 72–76
- Das Sozialsystem des Pferdes, Teil II: Führungspersönlichkeiten. 2009, 2, pp. 76–80
- Visuelle Fähigkeiten der Pferde. 2009
- Die Erkennung von Artgenossen und Menschen. 2009
- Das Gedächtnis der Pferde, 2009, 7
- Die Unarten des Pferdes, 2009, 9, pp. 84–89
- Charakterpferde, 2009, 12

=== Lectures as invited speaker at conferences ===
- Opening Speaker 43. Internationale Tagung Angewandte Ethologie

Die sensorische Lateralität als Indikator für emotionale und kognitive Reaktionen auf Umweltreize beim Tier (Übersichtreferat)
