= Fourth Orbán government =

Government of Hungary, 2018–2022

- 72nd Cabinet of Hungary
- 2018–2022
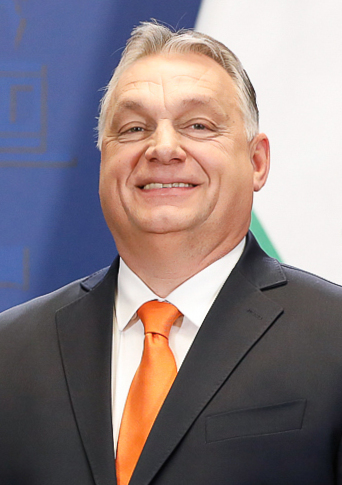
- Date formed: 18 May 2018
- Date dissolved: 24 May 2022

People and organisations
- Head of state: János Áder; Katalin Novák
- Head of government: Viktor Orbán
- Head of government's history: 1998–2002, 2010–2026
- Deputy head of government: Zsolt Semjén Mihály Varga Sándor Pintér
- Total no. of members: 16
- Member party: Fidesz; KDNP
- Status in legislature: Supermajority
- Opposition party: Jobbik; Momentum; MSZP; DK; LMP; Párbeszéd
- Opposition leader: Tamás Sneider (2018–2020) Péter Jakab (2020–2022)

History
- Election: 2018 election
- Outgoing election: 2022 election
- Legislature terms: 2018–2022
- Predecessor: Orbán III
- Successor: Orbán V

The fourth Orbán government (Hungarian: negyedik Orbán-kormány) was the government of Hungary from 18 May 2018 to 24 May 2022, after the 2018 parliamentary elections, led by Viktor Orbán.

== Policy ==
=== Social policy ===
On 2018 October, Orban's government issued a decree that came into force, removing gender studies from the list of master's programmes. The subject will be banned at Hungarian universities.

On 2020 19 May, Hungary outlaws changing birth gender on documents. The law, proposed by Fidesz party, passed by 133 votes to 57.

In November 2020, it was announced that Orban's government wanted to amended the definition of family in its constitution to allow an effective ban on adoption by same-sex couples and to mention in the constitution that the mother is a woman, the father a man. On 15 December 2020 The Hungarian parliament passes a law that effectively bans adoptions by same-sex couples. According to the measure, only married couples can adopt children while single people must obtain special approval to adopt from the family affairs minister, Lawmakers also amended the Hungarian constitution, with a new definition for family as the union of a father who is a man and a mother who is a woman. The Law passed by 134 votes to 45, with 5 abstentions.

On June 5, 2021, it was announced that Orban's government wanted a new law banning the 'promotion' of homosexuality and gender change to children under the age of 18 in schools, films or books. On June 15, the Hungarian parliament passed a new law that bans the 'promotion' of homosexuality and gender change to children in schools, films or books. Critics compared it to the 2013 Russian gay propaganda law. The Law passed by 157 votes to 1, with 41 abstentions. Fidesz–KDNP, Jobbik and Mi Hazánk voted for the law.

=== George Soros ===
On 16 May 2018, George Soros's Open Society Foundations announced it would move its office from Budapest to Berlin amid Hungarian government interference.

On 20 June 2018, the Hungarian Parliament passed a "Stop Soros law." Under it, anyone "facilitating illegal immigration" will face a year in prison.

On 3 December 2018, the Soros-linked Central European University announced it would cease operations in Hungary and relocate to Vienna, after the Hungarian government refused to sign an agreement allowing it to continue operations in Hungary.

=== China ===
In April 2021, it was announced that Orban's government wanted to build Chinese Fudan University campus with Chinese loans in Hungary. According to the plan the university campus would be built by a pre-approved (Chinese state construction firm), with workers, building materials and a €1.25 billion (HUF 450 billion) loan from China.

According to an opinion poll by think tank Republikon Institute, 66% of Hungarians oppose and 27% support the idea of the campus. Some 89 percent of opposition voters oppose the plan, as do 31 percent of the ruling Fidesz party's own supporters. The Opposition parties have called for a referendum. On 5 June 2020, an estimated 10,000 protested against building the university.

== Party breakdown ==
=== Beginning of term ===
Party breakdown of cabinet ministers in the beginning of term:

- Fidesz
7
- KDNP
2
- Independents
6

=== End of term ===
Party breakdown of cabinet ministers in the end of term:

- Fidesz
8
- KDNP
2
- Independents
5

== Vote in parliament ==
Election of the Prime Minister; Viktor Orbán (Fidesz)
Ballot →	10 May 2018
Required majority →	100 out of 198
Yes: • Fidesz (117); • KDNP (16); • MNOÖ (1)	134 / 198
No: • Jobbik (20); • DK (8)	28 / 198
Abstain	0 / 198
Not voting: • MSZP (15); • LMP (9); • Jobbik (5); • Dialogue (5); • DK (1); • Independent (1)	36 / 198

== Members of the Cabinet ==
Office	Name	Party	Term
Cabinet Office of the Prime Minister
Prime Minister	Viktor Orbán	Fidesz	2018–2022
Minister of the Cabinet Office of the Prime Minister	Antal Rogán	Fidesz	2018–2022
Prime Minister's Office
Deputy Prime Minister (General)	Zsolt Semjén	KDNP	2018–2022
Minister of the Prime Minister’s Office	Gergely Gulyás	Fidesz	2018–2022
Ministers
Deputy Prime Minister (for National Security) Minister of Interior	Sándor Pintér	Independent	2018–2022
Deputy Prime Minister (for Economic Politics) Minister of Finance	Mihály Varga	Fidesz	2018–2022
Minister of Foreign Affairs and Trade	Péter Szijjártó	Fidesz	2018–2022
Minister of Justice	László Trócsányi	Independent	2018–2019
Minister of Justice	Judit Varga	Fidesz	2019–2022
Minister of Human Resources	Miklós Kásler	Independent	2018–2022
Minister of Innovation and Technology	László Palkovics	Independent	2018–2022
Minister of Agriculture	István Nagy	Fidesz	2018–2022
Minister of Defence	Tibor Benkő	Independent	2018–2022
Ministers without portfolio
Minister for National Politics, Church Affairs and Nationalities	Zsolt Semjén	KDNP	2018–2022
Minister for the Planning, Construction and Commissioning of the two new blocks at Paks Nuclear Power Plant	János Süli	KDNP	2018–2022
Minister for Managing National Wealth	Andrea Bártfai-Mager	Independent	2018–2022
Minister for Family Affairs	Katalin Novák	Fidesz	2020–2021

== Composition ==
Government press officer Bertalan Havasi announced members of the cabinet on 27 April 2018.

Gen. Tibor Benkő, who has served as Chief of the General Staff of the Armed Forces of Hungary since 2010 was nominated to the position of Minister of Defence. After retiring, he took office as a civilian.

Office	Image	Incumbent	Political party	In office
Prime Minister		Viktor Orbán	Fidesz	10 May 2018 – 16 May 2022
Deputy Prime Minister (General); Minister without portfolio for National Politics, Church Affairs and Nationalities		Zsolt Semjén	KDNP	18 May 2018 – 24 May 2022
Deputy Prime Minister (for Economic Politics); Minister of Finance		Mihály Varga	Fidesz	18 May 2018 – 24 May 2022
Deputy Prime Minister (for National Security); Minister of Interior		Sándor Pintér	Independent	18 May 2018 – 24 May 2022
Minister of the Prime Minister's Office		Gergely Gulyás	Fidesz	18 May 2018 – 24 May 2022
Minister of the Prime Minister's Cabinet Office		Antal Rogán	Fidesz	18 May 2018 – 24 May 2022
Minister of Foreign Affairs and Trade		Péter Szijjártó	Fidesz	18 May 2018 – 24 May 2022
Minister of Justice		László Trócsányi	Independent	18 May 2018 – 30 June 2019
Minister of Justice		Judit Varga	Fidesz	12 July 2019 – 24 May 2022
Minister of Human Resources		Miklós Kásler	Independent	18 May 2018 – 24 May 2022
Minister of Innovation and Technology		László Palkovics	Independent	18 May 2018 – 24 May 2022
Minister of Agriculture		István Nagy	Fidesz	18 May 2018 – 24 May 2022
Minister of Defence		Tibor Benkő	Independent	18 May 2018 – 24 May 2022
Minister without Portfolio for the planning, construction and commissioning of the two new blocks at Paks Nuclear Power Plant		János Süli	KDNP	18 May 2018 – 24 May 2022
Minister without Portfolio for managing national wealth		Andrea Bártfai-Mager	Independent	18 May 2018 – 24 May 2022
Minister without Portfolio for family affairs		Katalin Novák	Fidesz	1 October 2020 – 31 December 2021
