= Dávid Dorosz =

Hungarian author, jurist, political strategist

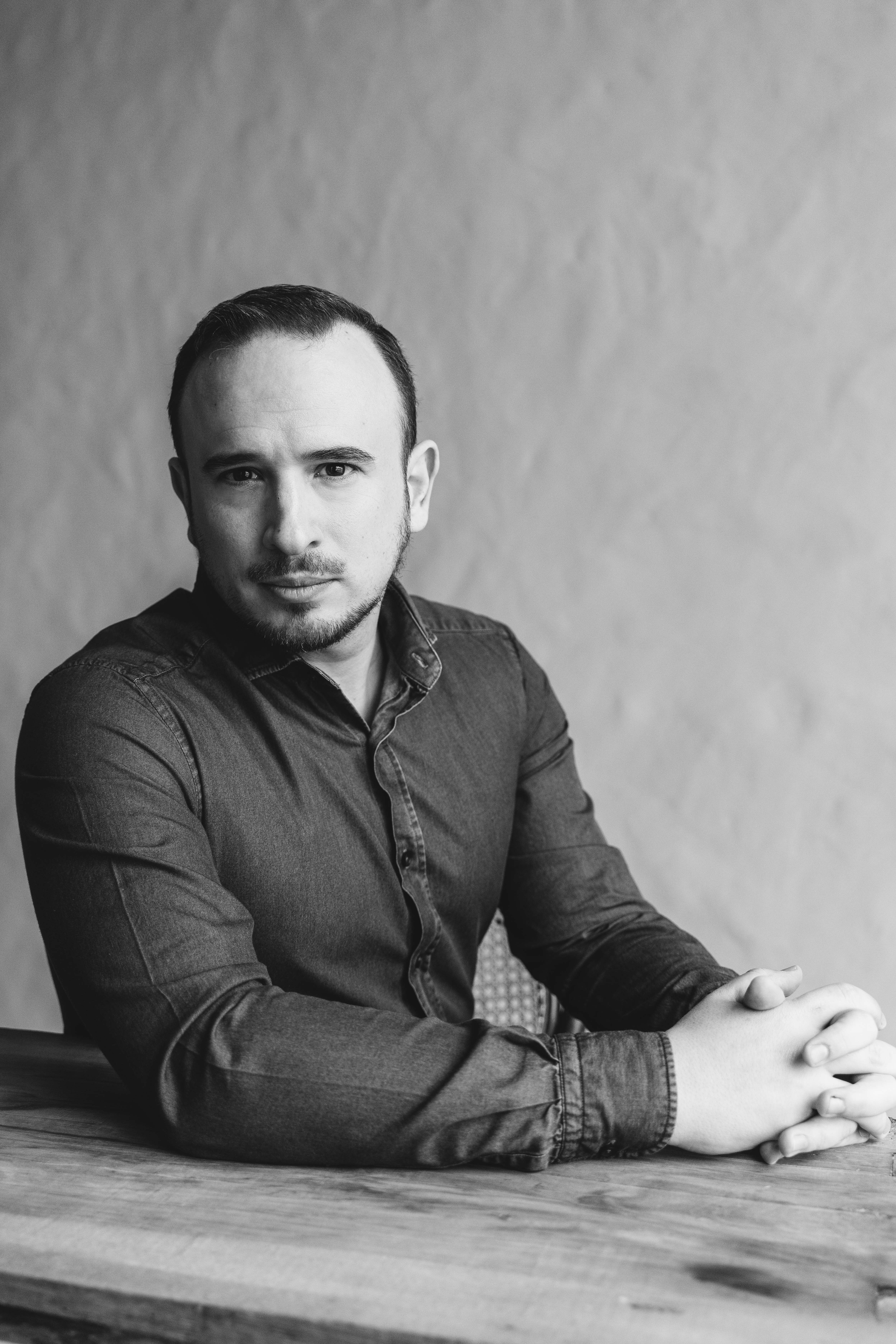

Deputy Mayor of Budapest for Climate and Development
- In office 5 November 2019 – 31 December 2020

Member of the National Assembly
- In office 14 May 2010 – 5 May 2014

Personal details
- Born: 6 October 1985 (age 40) Budapest, Hungary
- Party: LMP (2009–2013); PM (2013– )
- Education: Eötvös Loránd University Corvinus University of Budapest Webster University
- Profession: author, jurist, politician, campaign manager, entrepreneur

Dávid Dorosz (born 6 October 1985), is a Hungarian author, jurist, political strategist, campaign manager and politician, who has been the Deputy Mayor of Budapest for Climate and Development since November 2019. Dorosz was a member of the National Assembly (MP) from 2010 to 2014. He is former COO of the Dialogue for Hungary party. He is the author of the book "Time pressure - How we can avoid a global collapse?" which analyzes global challenges from a progressive angle. In 2025, Dorosz published his debut novel, Mindenki lelép (translated as We All Leave).

== Early life ==
Dorosz was born in Angyalföld, District XIII of Budapest. He graduated from Szilágyi Erzsébet Grammar School in 2004. He received a law degree from Eötvös Loránd University (2009) and an MBA from Webster University (2017). Besides studying, he worked as a trainee for several years in a law firm. He edited cultural and external programs for an online radio between 2006 and 2008. He is one of the founders of the Humana, a youth journal for human rights.

He joined Politics Can Be Different in the Spring of 2009. He served as campaign manager of the party for a mayoral by-election of Józsefváros in the Autumn of 2009. He also functioned as campaign manager for the 2010 parliamentary election. With Dorosz LMP achieved historic results making the organization the first-ever green party to clear the electoral threshold for the National Assembly.

== MP ==
Dorosz was elected to the National Assembly of Hungary from the party's Budapest Regional List. He was a member of the Committee on Foreign Affairs from 14 May 2010 to 7 March 2011. Thereafter, he held a membership position in the Defence and Internal Security Committee and the Committee of National Cohesion. He ran for a seat in Angyalföld at the 2010 municipal elections.

He served as board secretary of the party for a short time in 2011. He was appointed deputy leader of the LMP parliamentary group on 26 November 2012. In January 2013, the LMP's congress rejected against the electoral cooperation with other opposition forces, including Together 2014.

As a result, members of LMP's “Dialogue for Hungary” platform, including Dorosz, announced their decision to leave the opposition party and form a new organization. Benedek Jávor said the eight MPs leaving LMP would keep their parliamentary mandates. The leaving MPs established Dialogue for Hungary as a full-fledged party.

Dorosz ran as candidate of the Unity electoral alliance in Érd (Constituency I, Pest County) during the 2014 parliamentary election, but was defeated by incumbent MP András Aradszki (Fidesz) and lost his parliamentary mandate.

== Business career and MBA studies in the USA ==
After the 2014 election Dorosz started a business career in the I.T. sector, where he led his company to a successful exit. He also lived in the United States for years finishing an MBA at Webster University.

In 2020-21 he was a fellow in the Atlantic Council's Millennium Leadershop program.

== 2019 Mayoral election ==
He returned to the Hungarian politics by the 2019 local elections, becoming, alongside Zoltán Gál J., one of the two campaign managers of fellow Dialogue politician Gergely Karácsony, who was elected Mayor of Budapest. During the 10-month campaign Dorosz led the Karácsony-team through two rounds of primaries (first ones held in Hungary) and subsequently managed the joint Budapest campaign of the five opposition parties that supported his nominee. Dorosz was elected Deputy Mayor of Budapest for Climate and Development on 5 November 2019.

== Books ==
Dorosz's non-fiction book "Time pressure - How we can avoid a global collapse" was published in November 2019.

In 2025, Dorosz published his debut novel, Mindenki lelép (translated as We All Leave), through Cser Publishing. Blending psychological thriller with sharp social and political commentary, the story follows a group of friends reuniting at a luxurious villa above Lake Balaton. As buried secrets surface and tensions escalate, the narrative reflects on the moral compromises, personal disillusionments, and quiet despair of a generation navigating contemporary Hungary. Mindenki lelép was described by a critic as “the representative novel of his generation.” It was also shortlisted for the Margó Prize for Best Debut Novel.
