= Csaba Lantos (politician) =

Hungarian economist

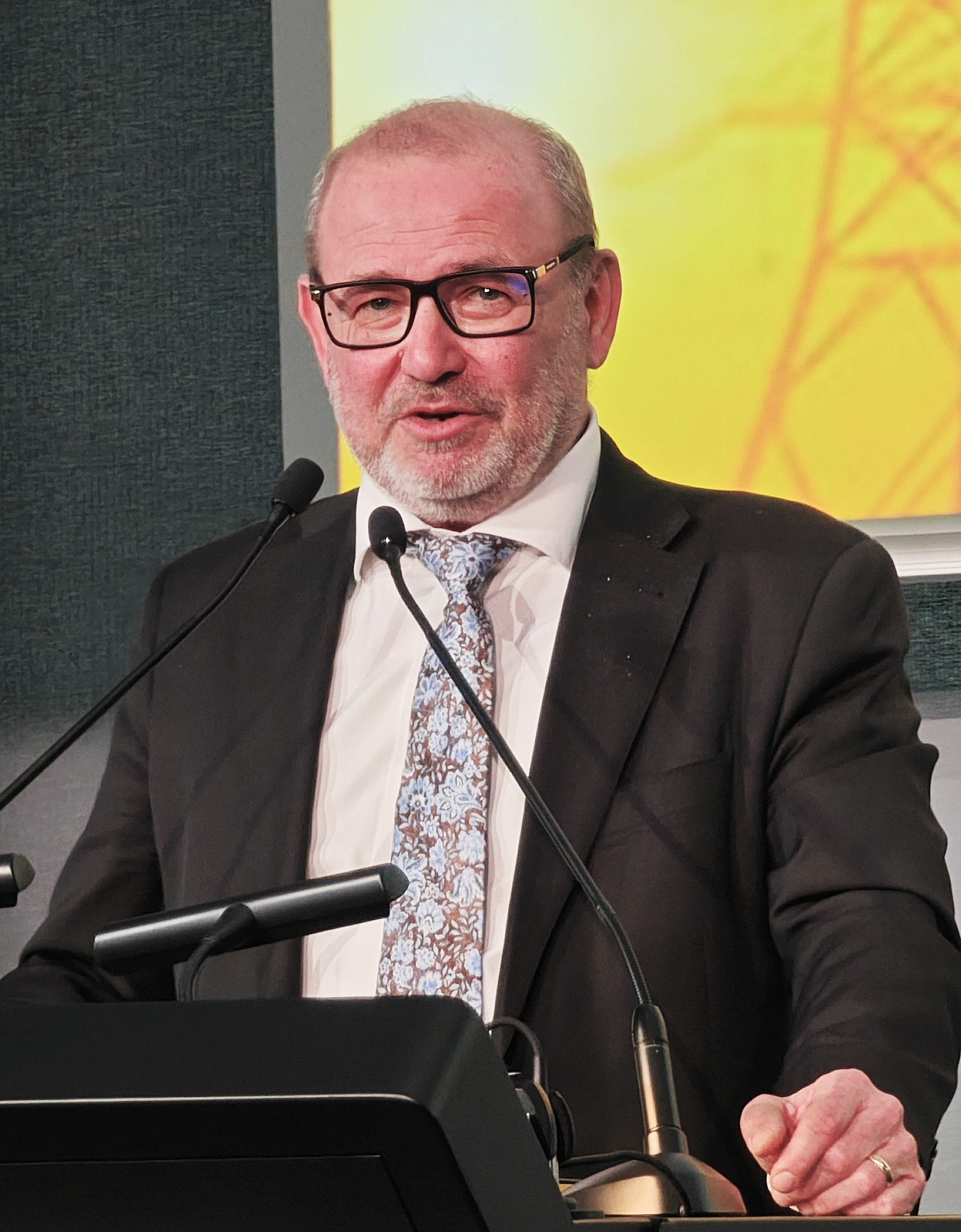
- Lantos in 2026

Minister of Energy
- In office 2022–2026
- Prime Minister: Viktor Orban
- Succeeded by: István Kapitány

Personal details
- Born: 28 January 1962 (age 64) Hódmezővásárhely, Hungary

Csaba Lajos Lantos (born 28 January 1962) is a Hungarian economist-sociologist, banker, investor and politician. From 2022 to 2026, he has been Minister of Energy in the Fifth Orbán Government.
