= János Csák =

Hungarian businessman and minister (born 1962)

János Zoltán Csák

Personal details
- Born: October 15, 1962 (age 63) Budapest, Hungary
- Children: 4
- Education: Corvinus University of Budapest
- Occupation: Economist-sociologist, corporate leader, honorary professor of management, and author

János Zoltán Csák (born 15 October 1962) is a Hungarian corporate leader, honorary professor of management, and author. He joined George Friedman's Geopolitical Futures LLC (Austin, TX, USA) as a partner in 2026. Previously served as Minister of Culture and Innovation between May 2022 till June 2024. Formerly, he served as Ambassador of Hungary to the United Kingdom between 2011 and 2014.

== Education ==
Csák holds an MSc in Finance and Sociology from the Corvinus University of Budapest (Hungary, 1987), and completed the Challenge of Leadership Program, INSEAD (France, 2000) and the Executive Program at the University of Michigan Business School (USA, 1996).

== Career ==
During his career Csák worked in executive and board positions for several companies in Europe, North America and Australia including Matáv (treasurer, 1993–2000), MOL Group (chairman, 1999–2000), T-Mobile Hungary (incl. chairman, 1997–2001), Creditanstalt Investment Bank (CA-IB), Budapest Bank (GE Money Bank), Gedeon Richter Plc. (non-executive board member, 2014–2019) Falcon Oil and Gas, and Wildhorse Energy Ltd.

He worked as treasurer of Matáv (now Magyar Telekom) playing an instrumental role in Matáv's $1 billion listing on the New York Stock Exchange, a deal seen as the model for future privatizations winning the International Financing Review Award in 1997. Csák also crafted and negotiated the biggest mobile deal in the Central European region to its date: the acquisition of Westel (now T-Mobile) for $885 million from MediaOne in 1999. Under his leadership in finance Matáv won the World's Best User of Syndicated Loans Award (Euromoney, 1997).

In 1996 he was a Senior Treasury Advisor at Ameritech Corporation (Chicago, USA).

During his tenure as chairman of the board at MOL in 1999–2000, he orchestrated a comprehensive growth strategy which resulted in the reconstruction of the leadership and the strategy of the group. Under his tenure, MOL acquired the Slovak energy company Slovnaft. As a result, MOL Group became a top-notch enterprise in the oil industry and a regional leader.

He was an executive board member of Creditanstalt Investment Bank, a Vienna-based comprehensive investment bank focusing on Central-Eastern Europe in 2001–2003, where he supervised the energy and telecom practices.

Between 2003-2010, 2014-2022, and from 2024 onwards Csák ran his own leadership and strategic advisory practice. As an investor, he turned around a number of companies, notably he revitalized Helikon's (a publisher of quality literature and art), and Heti Válasz's (a magazine reaching over 1% of the population nationwide, covering politics, economy and culture) brand strategy, and successfully sold both as efficient companies.

Csák was a visiting fellow in political economy and energy security at The Heritage Foundation in Washington, DC and at Acton Institute, in Grand Rapids, Michigan in 2009–10.

He served as Hungary's Ambassador accredited to the United Kingdom between 2011 and 2014.

Between 2016 and 2019 he was part-owner and Chairman of Design Terminal, a non-profit incubator, part-owner and Chairman of Arete Ltd., an early-stage investment company, and part-owner of Brain Bar, a major European festival on the future. Although he sold these companies in 2019,

Between 2017 and 2021 he was the Head of ConNext 2050 project at the Socialfuturing Center of the Corvinus University Budapest.

Between 2015 and 2022 he served as a non-executive director of Bank of China (CEE) Ltd, from 2019 to 2022 he was a member of the Ethics Subcommittee of the Hungarian Olympic Committee.

He is a member of the supervisory board of the Saint Francis Foundation of Déva. In 2003 he founded the Kálmán Széll Foundation, an association of business leaders.

== Awards ==
In recognition of his economic and social activities he was awarded the Commander's Cross of the Order of Merit of Hungary in 2010. He was conferred the Honorary Citizenship of the 20th district of Budapest (2013), and the Knight Grand Cross of Merit of the Sacred Military Constantinian Order of Saint George (UK, 2013). He was awarded the Sándor Wekerle Economic Grand Prize and the Rákóczi Prize in 2023.

== Personal life ==
He is married to Júlia Márton, they have four children and ten grandchildren. In his spare time, Csák enjoys literature, bicycling and motorbiking. In addition to writing essays, he also translated several books to Hungarian including novels and professional literature. His recent works are ’The Genius of America (Az amerikai géniusz), and The Good Side of Life - Searching for Values in an Volatile World (Az élet jó oldala - Értékek keresése az ingatag világban), co-authored with Franciscan monk Csaba Böjte. The American edition of János Csák's book, "The Genius of America" was published by Angelico Press in April 2024 in the United States.
