= Ministry of Finance (Hungary) =

Government minister of Hungary

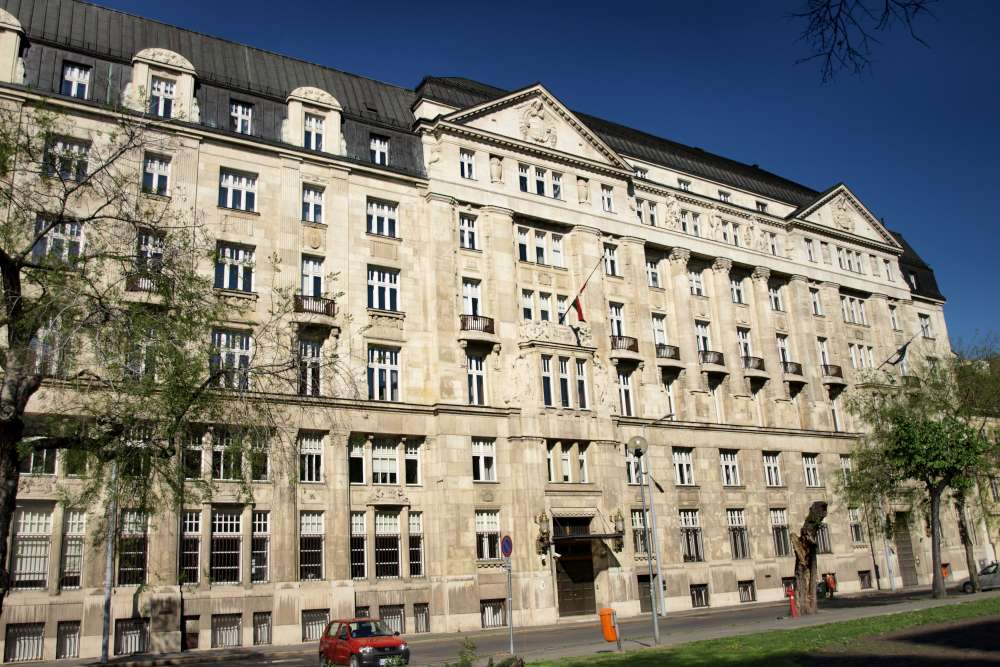
The Ministry of Finance building on Archduke Joseph Square

The Ministry of Finance (Hungarian: Pénzügyminisztérium, pronounced [ˈpeːnzyɟministeːrijum]) is the central fiscal ministry of the Hungarian government under the Minister of Finance. The building is located on József nádor square, built in 1910-1913 as head office of the Hungarian General Credit Bank.
