= Ekes =

Ekes can refer to:

- Ekés, the Romanian name for Plugova village, Mehadia Commune, Caraș-Severin County, Romania
- Ékes, Hungarian surname

== See also ==
- Eke (disambiguation)
