= Eke (name) =

Eke is the name of the following people:

== Given name ==
- Eke Uzoma (born 1989), Nigerian footballer

== Surname ==
- ʻAisake Eke, Tongan
- Alexander Eke (1912–2004), British basketball player
- Algı Eke (born 1985), Turkish actress
- Cahide Eke (born 2000), Turkish para judoka
- Chacha Eke, Nigerian actress
- Frank Eke (1931–2013), Nigerian medical doctor and politician
- Halime Eke (born 1999), Turkish martial artist
- Harrison Eke (1888–1917), English footballer
- John Eke (1886–1964), Swedish athlete
- Michael Eke (born 1968), English former policeman
- Nadia Eke (born 1993), Ghanaian triple jumper
- Prince Eke, Nigerian actor
- Urum Kalu Eke (born 1964), Nigerian banker
