= Ecke =

Ecke is a surname.

== List of people with the surname ==
- Gustav Ecke (1896–1971), German-American historian
- Matthias Ecke (born 1983), German politician
- Paul Ecke Ranch, American florist
- Robert Ecke, American experimental physicist

== Other ==
- Carl Ecke, piano company

== See also ==
- Eek
- Eckes
