= Budapest Pride =

Annual LGBTQ event in Hungary

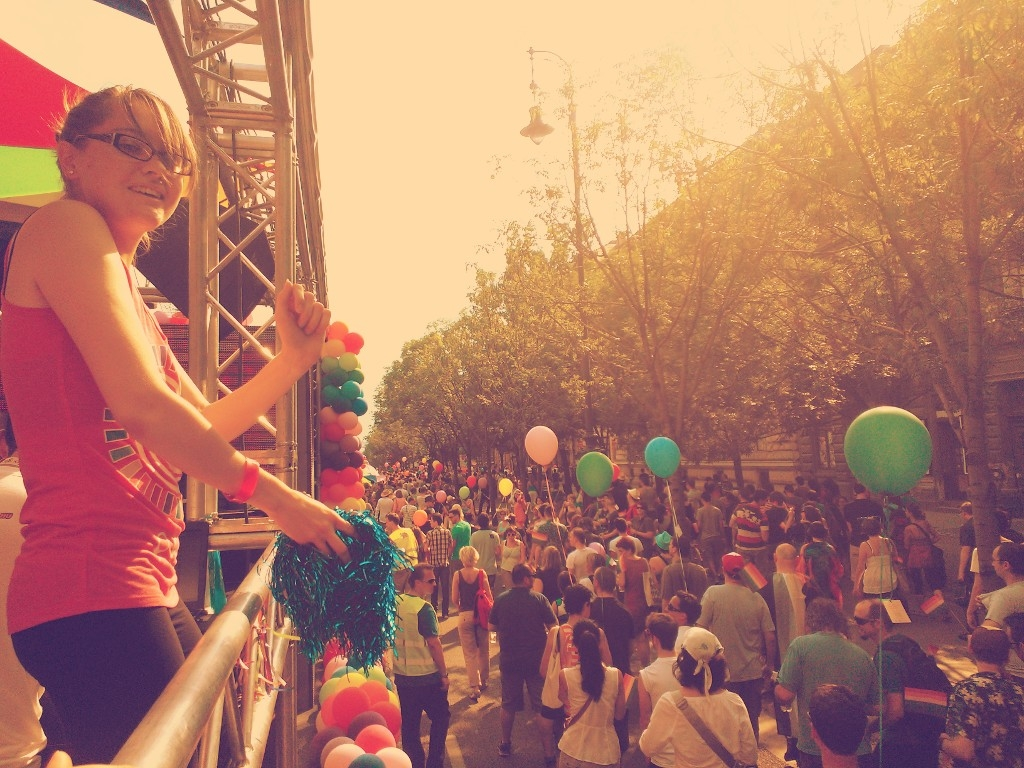
- Budapest Pride 2013
- Native name: Budapest Pride Közösségi Fesztivál
- Date: 1997
- Location: Budapest, Hungary
- Also known as: Budapest Pride Community Festival
- Type: LGBTQ pride festival
- Organized by: Viktória Radványi, President

Budapest Pride, or Budapest Pride Film and Cultural Festival, is Hungary's largest annual LGBTQ event. Of the week-long festival, the march is the most visible event. The march has historically been known under several names, including Budapest Gay Dignity Procession (Hungarian: Meleg Méltóság Menet), and has taken place each year since 1997, usually on the first Saturday of July, proceeding along Budapest's most expansive thoroughfare, Andrássy Avenue, between the City Park (Városliget) and Elizabeth Square (Erzsébet tér). Though much smaller in scale than similar gay pride parades in Western Europe and the Americas, around one to two thousand marchers typically participate in the Budapest procession. Radical right-wing demonstrators and hooligans severely disrupted the Budapest Pride marches held in 2007 and 2008, casting uncertainty over the future of the event. However, Budapest Pride has been held successfully in the intervening years, with minimal incidents.

In November 2021, then-Budapest Pride board member Viktória Radványi was honoured with a "Generation Change Award" at the 2021 MTV Europe Music Awards in Budapest. She has since become President of Budapest Pride.

The far right party Mi Hazánk called for a ban on LGBTQ pride marches on multiple occasions, and they succeeded in enacting one on 18 March 2025, however people gathered for Pride regardless and the 2025 event (which also doubled as a general protest against the Government of Viktor Orbán and Fidesz) became the largest in the festival's history. The ban was de facto overturned in 2026, following Orbán and Fidesz's defeat in that year's elections.

== Festival ==
Although the march is the best known aspect of the festival, the Budapest Pride Film and Cultural Festival includes many other events, such as its film festival, discussions, exhibitions, theater productions, author readings, picnics, speeches, religious events, concerts, and parties. In 2011, the festival had over 100 events.

== Early years ==
There was only a smattering of public protest against the first eleven Budapest gay parades, until the one held in July 2007. In 2003, prominent right-wing radical György Budaházy and a group of about 30 anti-gay protestors blew whistles and chanted slogans such as "dirty queers" at marchers as the parade crossed the Elizabeth Bridge. In 2004, a few activists from the center-right Christian democratic Hungarian Democratic Forum political party stood along the route of the procession blowing whistles and holding signs displaying quotations from the Bible, while police took one man into custody for throwing a rock at an officer at the beginning of the parade. In 2005, about 10 neo-Nazis taunted paraders at one point along the route, while the notorious blogger, inciter and media manipulator Tamás Polgár (known by the alias "Tomcat") rigged to a pillar of the Chain Bridge a rolled-up, egg-filled sign, which he intended to unfurl via remote control as the procession crossed the bridge, thus dropping its contents down onto the marchers. However, the remote-control malfunctioned, forcing Tomcat and an accomplice to climb up the pillar to manually disengage the sign reading "stupid queer gays" (hülye buzi melegek), though only after the parade had passed underneath. In 2006, about a dozen activists from the radical right-wing Jobbik (Movement for a Better Hungary) political party and another dozen protestors affiliated with the right-wing extremist Hungarian Self-Defense Movement (Magyar Önvédelmi Mozgalom) heckled participants in the parade.

== 2007 ==
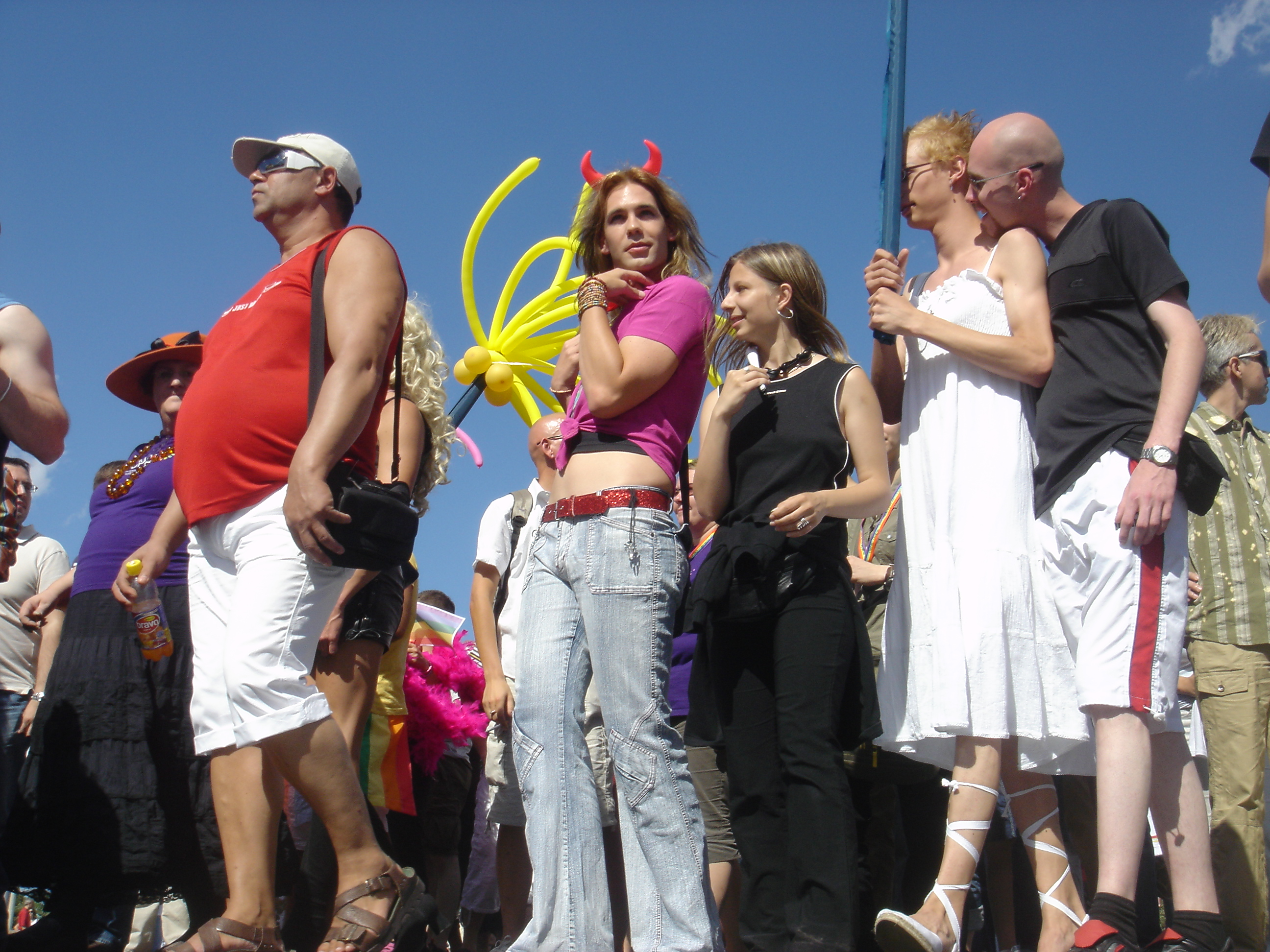
Participants in the 2007 Budapest Gay Dignity Procession

The 12th Budapest Gay Dignity Procession held on 7 July 2007, was the first to encounter substantial, belligerent protest. Some 2000 participants marched from Procession Square (Felvonulási Tér) past Heroes' Square down Andrássy Avenue. Several balloon-decorated flatbed trucks marshaled the parade down the avenue, blaring techno-pop from mounted speakers and carrying the standard array of shirtless young men, transvestites, neo-punk lesbians and campy-costumed figures, including a man in tight shorts, a black shirt, and a clerical collar, who held a big pink book bearing a cross and was later to become the focus of attacks from the far-right media, particularly Kuruc.info.

Several hundred police escorted the procession in full riot gear, ready to protect participants from expected aggression en route to the parade's destination at a dance club located on the Pest side of the Danube called Buddha Beach. Just as in 2006, the extraparliamentary Jobbik party and the Hungarian Self-Defense Movement had organized demonstrations against the gay parade. However a culture of right-wing public protest and violent hooliganism had emerged in Hungary during the intervening year with the outbreak of massive anti-government demonstrations known collectively as the "fall disturbances" (őszi zavargások) in September and October 2006, prompting police to expect that the 2007 protests against the gay parade would be much more extensive and aggressive.

Approximately 500 protesters awaited the parade behind a metal-fence barrier erected at the site of Jobbik's officially announced anti-gay demonstration at the corner of the Oktogon, chanting "dirty queers!" and pelting marchers with eggs as they turned south onto the Grand Boulevard (Nagy Körút) on their way toward Buddha Beach. A rank of riot police wedged between the procession and the protesters, who had begun to bombard participants with, in addition to eggs, empty beer cans, smoke bombs and plastic bags filled with petroleum jelly and sand, the latter alluding to the Hungarian slang word homokos, literally "sandy", for "gay". Police chased those seen throwing these objects at marchers up to several hundred yards down the sidewalk, eventually arresting and charging eight protesters for disturbing the peace. Police narrowly averted a more brutal assault on the parade, chasing off a group of approximately 30 hooligans, who discarded bags full of empty bottles and fist-sized rocks as they fled down a side street. Jeering protesters accompanied the parade all the way to its terminus, dispersing following a brief standoff with riot cops and police dogs during which they changed slogans such as "Queers into the Danube, Jews after them!" and "Gyurcsány [Hungary's prime minister] get out!"

The Budapest police, after effectively buffering marchers from the protesters during the procession, failed to protect people leaving Buddha Beach later that evening, when, according to parade organizers, 11 attacks took place in the vicinity of the club against gays, two of whom required medical treatment. A freelance photographer for the Hungarian News Agency MTI won 2nd place in the 2007 World Press Photo contest with his photograph of two gay German tourists who were among those attacked following the parade. Several civil organizations in Hungary and Amnesty International criticized the Budapest police (BRFK) for failing to sufficiently protect participants in the 2007 Budapest gay parade, both during and after the event. The BRFK subsequently initiated disciplinary procedures against one officer for failing to respond to a call for police protection following the parade.

== 2008 ==
Budapest Police Chief Gábor Tóth, evidently aware that the 2008 Gay Dignity Procession was likely to elicit even greater protest than that in 2007, on 11 June informed the event's organizer, the Rainbow Mission Foundation [Szivárvány Misszió Alapítvány], that the BRFK had prohibited its request to hold the 2008 parade along Andrássy Avenue on July 5 on the grounds that it would "impede the circulation of mass transit and vehicle traffic". Fifteen Hungarian gay organizations, including the Rainbow Mission Foundation, sent a letter to the BRFK the following day protesting the decision, urging the Budapest police "not to try to prevent expected right-wing extremist attacks on the parade by forbidding it, but to do its duty to defend the marchers from expected aggression." Additionally, liberal Budapest Mayor Gábor Demszky refuted Chief Tóth's claim that the parade would unduly obstruct traffic in the vicinity of Andrássy Avenue, while the Hungarian Civil Liberties Union (known in its Hungarian-language acronymic form as TASZ) and the Hungarian Helsinki Committee [Magyar Helsinki Bizottság] human rights organization also denounced the BRFK's prohibition of the parade. (TASZ announced that it would provide Hungarian gay organizations with legal services in the event that they chose to file a lawsuit against the BRFK for banning the parade, noting that the Budapest police routinely closes Andrássy Avenue to vehicle traffic for weekend events, most recently for the National Gallop equestrian show held on the weekend of 31 May – 1 June 2008.) The BRFK retracted its prohibition of the gay parade the very same day, on 12 June, announcing one week later that it had approved the Rainbow Mission Foundation's original request to hold the event along the established route on the customary first Saturday of July.

The most influential right-wing extremist groups and websites immediately went on the offensive following the announcement that the Budapest gay parade would be held as usual in 2008. On 18 June, Budaházy and his close associate, the leader of the radical-nationalist 64 Counties Youth Movement [64 Vármegye Ifjúsági Mozgalom] László Toroczkai, issued a joint communiqué regarding the parade:

We will not permit aberrant foreigners of this or that color to force their alien and sick world on Hungary. We hereby publicly declare that we, ourselves, will defend the Hungarian capital. Every Hungarian patriot is needed! Stand among the defenders, or form defensive forces from among your groups and organizations, and come to the Oktogon in Budapest at 4 o'clock in the afternoon of July 5.! It is our moral duty to act....

The Rainbow Rampage, the aggressive pederast caravan of degenerate foreigners that is traversing Europe, will arrive to its final stop in Budapest on July 4, Freemasonry's biggest holiday and the anniversary of the signing of America's Declaration of Independence, in order to celebrate queerdom in our capital for several days on end. Beginning at 4 p.m. on July 5, this exhibitionist queer rabble will hold a public procession and street ball, trampling under foot all fundamental traditional moral values and proclaiming Hungary's occupation by aberrants and foreigners.

HOWEVER.

During these days, we Hungarian patriots will recall the Battle of Pressburg in which the forces of our founding father, Prince Árpád, inflicted a crushing defeat upon the western armies....

The army of Hunnia will defend the capital of the Hungarians on July 5, 2008!.

All the major right-wing radical websites in Hungary published this announcement, whose authors arguably command the greatest capacity in the country to mobilize right-wing extremists for engagement in violent street action. Also on 18 June, the Hungarian Self-Defense Movement (known in its Hungarian-language acronymic form as MÖM), which had been involved in organizing protests against the previous two gay parades, published an appeal on the organization's website under the heading "On July 5 we will attack out of self-defense!":

We summon all Hungarians, responsibly minded families, fathers and mothers, to all come and expel the pederast horde once and for all! We cannot simply watch passively as such genetic trash shows a bad example for our children! ... We call upon all Hungarian self-defenders to resist on Saturday afternoon on July 5, we will meet at the designated place! We will unite our forces at the Oktogon!

On 28 June, an anonymous self-described founding member of a fan club for the Budapest soccer team Ferencváros, whose supporters have a highly publicized history of hooliganism and participation in right-wing extremist street aggression, published a letter on MÖM 's website stating that "we are answering the Hungarian Self-Defense Movement's appeal":

We will be there! With weapons if we must, with bare hands if we must, but we will not let things stand as they are! Let those who oppose us tremble with fear!

On 19 June, Tomcat proposed on his website Bomb Factory (Bombagyár) that a straight parade be held at the same time as the gay parade:

The annual "gay pride" day is coming as usual. The queers spend millions on their exhibitionism so that a few hundred people can put their perversions on display for the world. Are there enough healthy, heterosexual people out there, who marching opposite them, not shouting, not throwing things (we don't need a parade to do this), perhaps holding hands with their partners, to show that the love of the opposite sex is worth more?

On 26 June, Hungary's primary right-wing extremist website, Kuruc.info, published a list of gay bars, cafés, saunas, guest houses and hotels in Budapest. This was an ominous development, since beginning in December 2007 a group called the Arrows of the Hungarians National Liberation Army (Magyarok Nyilai Nemzeti Felszabadító Hadsereg) had firebombed several residences and other locations implicitly identified as targets on the website. Early the following morning, a Molotov cocktail was thrown into the entry of the gay-frequented Action Bar in Budapest, while on the morning of July 2, four Molotov cocktails were tossed into one of the city's sauna gay bathhouse in Budapest, slightly injuring one of the establishment's employees. On July 3, Kuruc.info reported on the latter firebombing under the title "Cleansing Fire Licks Another Mini Sodom" in which the website noted that "Incidentally, we drew the attention of our readers to the sauna, just in case they wanted a little hot air." Though the Arrows of the Hungarians did not claim responsibility for the firebombings as the organization had done in previous cases, usually publishing video recordings of the attacks, Kuruc.info asked the largely rhetorical question following the assault on the Action Bar "has the Arrows of the Hungarians National Liberation Army struck again?" Kuruc.info further prepared its readers for the gay parade with the publication of detailed instructions, including pictures, two days before the event, on how to fill eggs with dye for throwing at the marchers in the procession.

Tomcat, meanwhile, began the process of organizing his heterosexual counter-procession, though he was first compelled to explain how it was that he had actually marched in the 2004 Gay Dignity Procession:

... I participated carrying a "NOT ME" sign, though I did not want to eliminate or throw things at anybody. In fact, I found the events that took place there to be absolutely acceptable.... Yes, I observed the 2004 queer parade from the inside. I also took photos and chatted with the queers. I met among them some old buddies as well. And I still maintain that there was no problem with that parade. But I also maintain that now, in 2008, go ahead and bombard them with all sorts of stuff and eradicate their organizers. . . In 2004, and earlier I think, there were neither fags running around half naked, nor pink-Bible-licking obscenities, nor rump rummagers jumping all over each other in public.... However, one year later the Pride had totally changed and was not simply a party for queers. Politics had got hold of it by that time, the lackey media did the job of vilifying the "homophobes," and the whole thing degenerated into an unprincipled advertisement for wild-liberal values.... The standard has been sinking ever since. It is no accident that fewer and fewer normal homos support the parade.... With regard to my allegedly boundless homophobia, it is enough to note that Bomb Factory has a gay editor as well. He doesn't make any particular secret out of it. And I have several gay friends and acquaintances besides him as well. None of them will be there [at the gay parade] on Saturday. Surely they are "far-right extremists" too.

On July 1, Tomcat summoned his so-called "factory dwellers" to prepare for the Bomb Factory counter-procession:

There are only a couple of days left until the Saturday street battles, so it is time that we began getting ready. Of course, we would not for the world harm those dear homosexual people, who want to truck down the entire length of Andrássy Avenue, but let's at least show them that we are here on this world as well.... We welcome all our healthy, heterosexual friends and also those homos who condemn those lunatics dressed in their disgusting garb and kindly decline to have these people represent them. Our procession will travel along the same route as that of the queers, and we will proceed down Andrássy Avenue opposite them. We won't yell, we won't throw things, we won't murder—the Kuruc people will do that in our place.

And finally, on the night before the parade, Tomcat issued a last reminder:

You haven't forgotten have you? ... We welcome everybody, and bring your partners with you. Those who would like to beat up queers can join Budaházy's group, though I don't see a very good opportunity to do this with so many cops around.... Our demonstration will not be violent, we aren't going to throw things or fight. Of course, it is still possible to thwart the queer parade. A kind Bomb Factory dweller is organizing an egg-throwing team. Those interested should contact....

The far-right Movement for a Better Hungary (Jobbik), which had led efforts to organize demonstrations against previous Budapest Gay Dignity Processions, remained inactive with regard to the 2008 parade until the morning of the event, when the party published the following communiqué on its website:

Ban the Queer Procession from Budapest!

The instigators motivated in the force field of the extreme-liberal SZDSZ are marching on the streets to demonstrate in favor of their deviant views this year as well.... We inform the misguided people preparing to take to the streets: you can still turn back before you collide the walls of awakening and organizing social resistance!

There is currently a government-inspired show-like trial taking place against the Hungarian Guard [Magyar Gárda], while liberals and left-wingers within several local councils have initiated the prohibition of this charitable organization from their territory, including Budapest. At the same time, the police, in conformity with [Budapest Mayor] Gábor Demszky's expectations, chose to review their original decision and permitted the initially banned homosexual event....

We request that the self-defined Christian-conservative MDF and Fidesz-KDNP not distance themselves from Jobbik and the Hungarian Guard, but from the true extremists. We urge them to read the Old Testament, Leviticus 20:13: "If a man lies with a man as one lies with a woman, both of them have done what is detestable. They must be put to death; their blood will be on their own heads."

The BRFK had good reason to suspect, as the political daily Népszabadság reported on 25 June, that "marchers would be exposed to more and increasingly brutal attacks than last year." All of Hungary's main right-wing extremist leaders, organizations and media—Budaházy, Torockai, Tomcat, the Hungarian Self-Defense Movement, the Hungarian National Committee Jobbik, ostensibly the Arrows of the Hungarians Liberation Army, Kuruc.info, Bombagyár, Holy Crown Radio (Szent Korona Rádió), Barikád.hu—had rallied with an exceptional degree of unity and purpose behind the cause of "defending the capital" against the "pederast horde." (Already in June, the main pages of the Kuruc.info and the Hungarian Self-Defense Movement websites had displayed countdown clocks showing the number of days, hours, minutes and seconds until the start of the 2008 Budapest gay parade.) Far-right attacks on gay parades held the previous weekend in Brno Czech Republic and Sofia, Bulgaria, both of which resulted in a considerable number of arrests, were also a powerful portent of what was likely to take place at the 13th Budapest Gay Dignity Procession.

At the parade, as police helicopters hovered overhead, protesters broke down the tall metal fences surrounding the parade's endpoint at Heroes' Square. They threw eggs, bottles, rocks, and firecrackers at the marchers, and cobblestones and gasoline bombs at police. At least 10 people were injured, including two policemen, and three media trucks were damaged; they hit, among others, liberal MP Gabor Horn, and broke the window of the police car in which Hungarian Socialist Party MEP Katalin Levai was riding with Gábor Szetey, the first out gay member of Hungary's government. Riot police dispersed the protesters using tear gas and water cannons. A total of 45 to 49 people were arrested. The police protection of the parade had an estimated cost of 500 000 dollars (100 million HUF).

== 2009 ==
The police kept protestors, but also other onlookers and well-wishers, one block away from Andrássy Road, so that the march had no contact to the public, although it was extensively covered by television. An infiltrator attempted to disrupt the march by bursting balloons, but was frightened away by booing.

However, some protestors threw stones at the police and burned the rainbow flag used by the organisers of the parade.

In 2009, Fidesz politician Ilona Ékes, wrote to the police to ban a gay pride event in Budapest, saying that homosexuality was a mental illness and demonstrators would scandalise people, as they did in previous years, when homosexual activists imitated sexual intercourse on stage and other activists were allegedly blasphemous. According to Ékes, the demonstrations would harm youngsters, whose school season was to start on the same day.

== 2025 ==
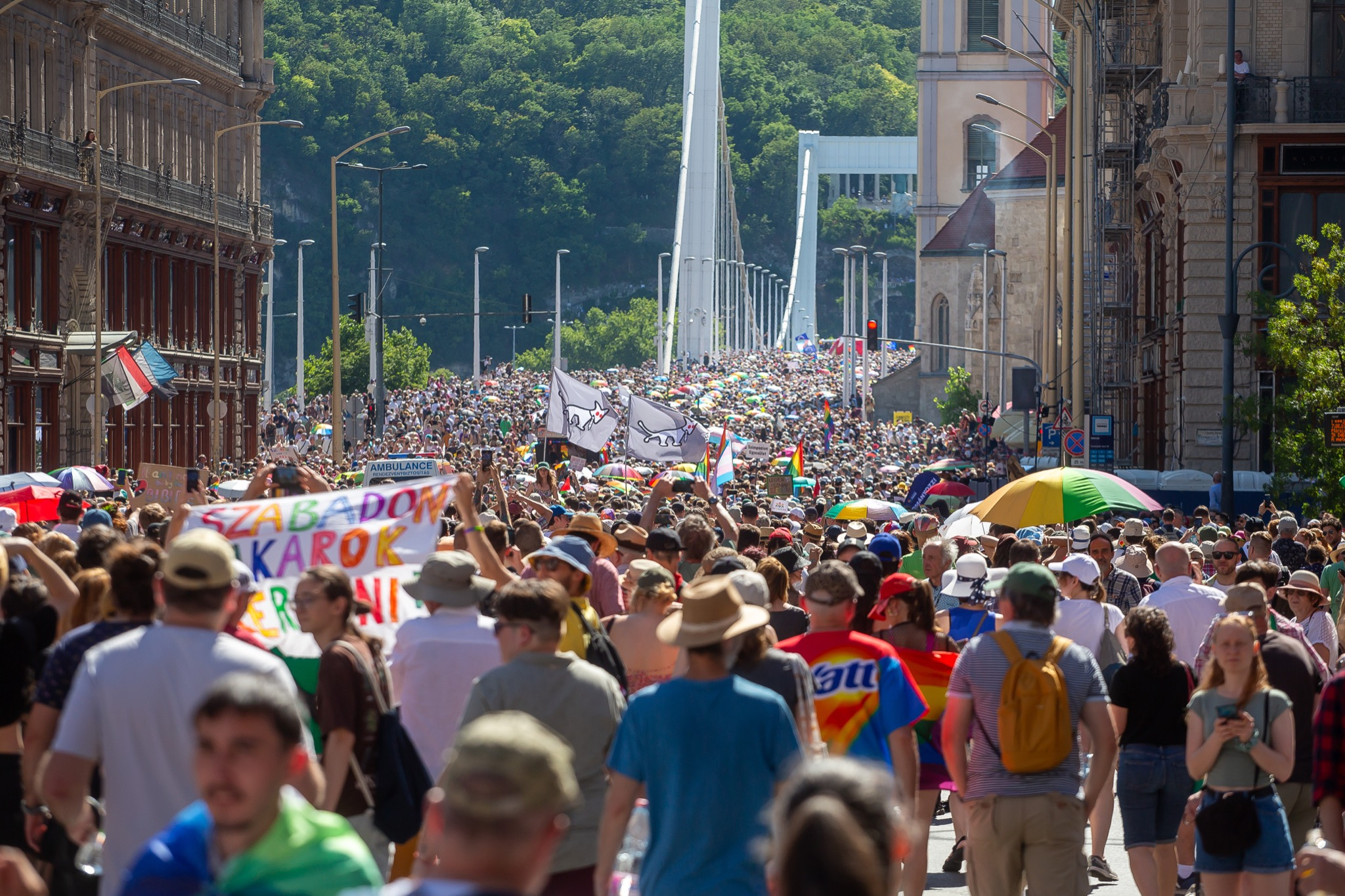
People attending the parade in 2025.

Despite the threat of fines under the Hungarian Pride ban, tens of thousands of Pride marchers assembled in Budapest. Organisers estimated that 200,000 people showed up, surpassing the previous record of 35,000.

Our Homeland Movement Vice President Előd Novák said that the government made a fool of themselves for making a law but not sticking to it in practice.

== See also ==
- Human rights in Hungary
- Hungarian anti-LGBTQ law
- Hungarian LGBT Alliance
- LGBTQ history in Hungary
- LGBTQ rights in Hungary
