= Ékes =

Ékes is a Hungarian surname. Notable people with the surname include:

- Ilona Ékes (born 1953), Hungarian politician
- József Ékes (1951–2025), Hungarian politician

== See also ==
- Ekés, a village in Romania, see Mehadia
