= Human rights in Hungary =

Human rights in Hungary are governed by the Constitution of Hungary, laws passed by the National Assembly, and oversight of international organizations such as the Council of Europe. Human rights groups such as Amnesty International and Human Rights Watch have raised concern for the status of human rights in Hungary under the rule of Viktor Orbán and the Fidesz party since 2010.

== Legal basis ==
The Constitution of Hungary states that the primary obligation of the state is to protect the rights of man. It also lists many rights that are protected, provides for rights to be defined by law, and guarantees that these rights are not to be applied in a discriminatory manner. Act CXXV of 2003 guarantees equal treatment to all people in Hungary. Hungary is party to several international organizations and treaties to protect human rights. It joined the Council of Europe in 1990 and is bound by the European Convention on Human Rights.

As part of a process of illiberalization, the state's obligation to protect human rights has weakened under the Fidesz government. Judicial decisions are less like to consider human rights as a factor, and the Hungarian government is less likely to apply the human rights standards agreed upon by the international community.

== Political freedom ==
The Hungarian government has been accused by Human Rights Watch of circumventing the separation of powers and governing through an increasingly powerful executive. Corruption in the Hungarian government is not addressed despite criticism from organizations such as the Group of States against Corruption. The Freedom of Information Act is limited in its power to require disclosure and many government activities are exempted. In response to the COVID-19 pandemic in March 2020, the government granted emergency powers to the executive that granted it wide latitude in ruling by decree, and these powers were renewed several times afterward. These powers have been used to restrict civil liberties outside the scope of public health.

The Democracy Index ranked Hungary as the 56th most democratic country in 2021, with a score of 6.50 out of 10. Freedom House ranked Hungary as "Partly Free" in 2024 with a score of 65/100. In the Corruption Perceptions Index, Hungary ranked 73rd out of 180 countries in 2021.

=== Elections ===
Manipulation of electoral laws, electoral irregularities, and control of the media have been raised as concerns during elections alongside voter support for illiberal democracy. An OSCE report in 2018 found that the government discourages public involvement in election oversight through "intimidating rhetoric" and that elections are often operated without the presence of opposition or nonpartisan observers. No evidence was found of election fraud that would affect the results of an election.

The ruling party of Fidesz has been found to use state resources to impede the ability of electoral challengers to compete, and the government has been accused of imposing financial penalties on districts and cities where the opposition is in power. The government has been accused of running fraudulent opposition candidates to split the vote in Fidesz's favor. Authorities have also interfered with the ability of opposition figures to engage in peaceful political activities. State media is used by the Orbán government in campaigning and the State Audit Office is used to police opposition political activity while overlooking the activity of Fidesz.

== Civil liberties ==
=== Freedom of expression ===
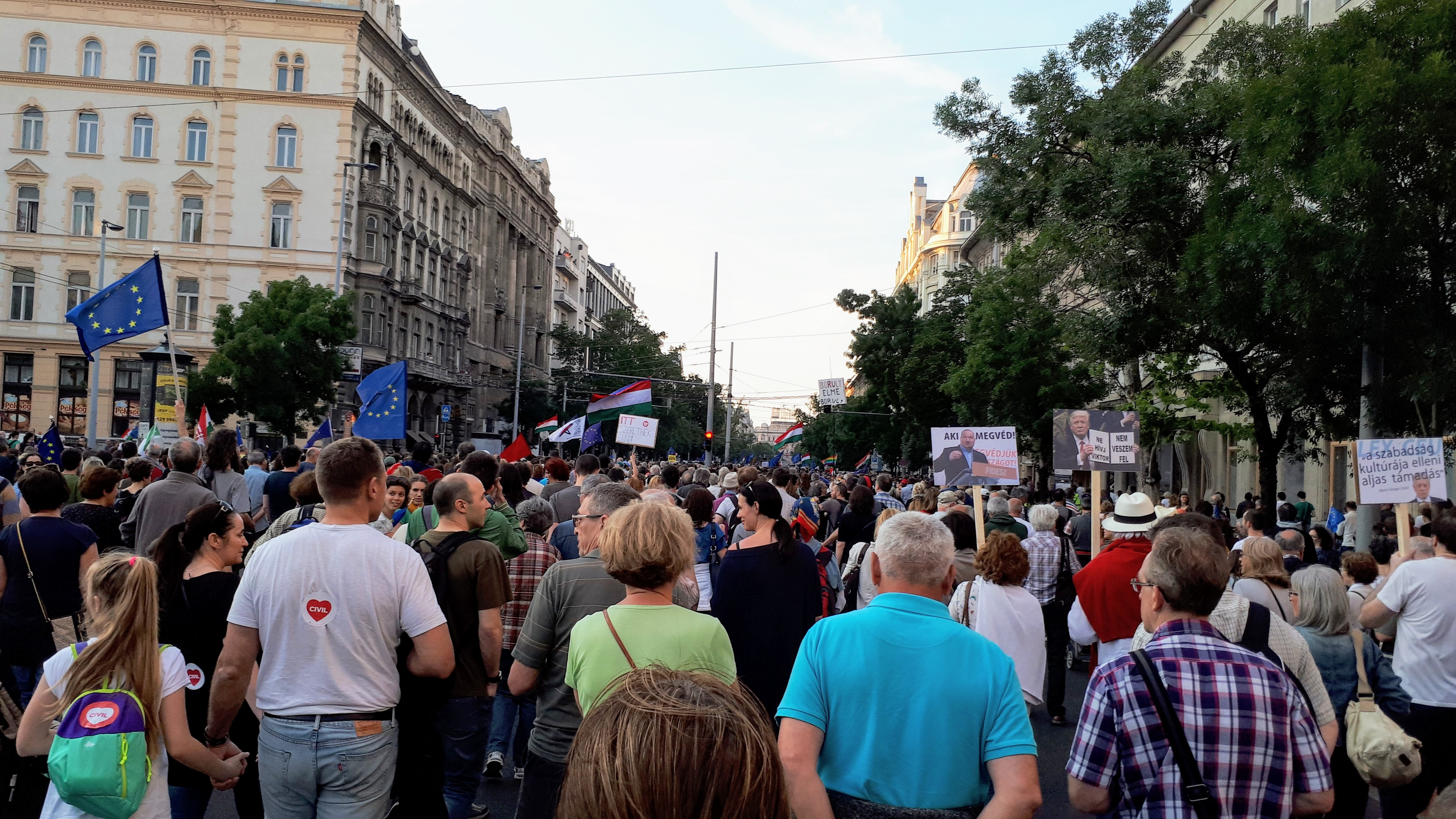
Protest against the government in 2017.

The constitution guarantees the right to freedom of expression, though it also criminalizes hate speech. Hate speech and genocide denial can be penalized with up to three years in prison. In 2016, the European Court of Human Rights found that Hungary had violated the rights of judge András Baka following his dismissal for criticizing the government in Baka v. Hungary.

Protest is legal in Hungary and regularly exercised, though limitations were applied following a constitutional amendment and a legal act in 2018. In response to a demonstration in front of the home of the Prime Minister, the government of Hungary has restricted the ability to protest in a way determined to violate privacy rights, and Hungarian police have been given "broad discretionary powers" to enforce this law. The Hungarian Civil Liberties Union opposed the change, citing concerns of police overreach and silencing of protests against Hungarian court rulings.

=== Freedom of the press ===
Media in Hungary is mostly controlled by the government, and independent journalism is limited. Privacy violations have been targeted against investigative journalists, and the government has issued criminal charges for printing things that it determines to be false. Media outlets that are critical of Fidesz are often purchased or shut down by the government. As of 2019, nearly 80% of the market of political news had its financing controlled by the ruling party, and rural areas typically do not have access to independent news. Journalists are often denied access to information and publicly criticized in state propaganda.

In 2021, the Commissioner for Human Rights issued a memorandum condemning Hungary's limited freedom of expression and media freedom, criticizing "sustained smear campaigns" against journalists and human rights advocates to stifle criticism of the government, the power of the Hungarian Media Council over media funding, and the lack of accountability in pro-government media. United Nations special rapporteur for freedom of expression Irene Khan found in a 2021 investigation that free media has been undermined in Hungary.

=== Right to due process ===
The right to due process is generally protected in Hungary. The criminal justice system of Hungary requires that suspects be informed of the charges against them. Suspects can be held for at most 72 hours, after which time a pretrial detention motion must be filed for continued detainment. Several circumstances entitle the defendant to legal counsel and suspects are entitled to be informed of their rights by police before questioning. Defendants are entitled to a fair trial, and this right has generally been enforced. The law provides for an independent judiciary, though human rights organizations have alleged that the independence of the judiciary has been compromised by the government under Fidesz. Amnesty International has found that the president's power over the judiciary has undermined its independence.

Physical abuse by police often goes unreported and is not often investigated. Conditions in prisons have been found to be inadequate, though an increase in facilities in 2020 has alleviated overcrowding. The Hungarian prison system still functions at a 107% occupancy rate, and Hungary has the highest prison population in 33 years.

=== Right to privacy ===
The constitution guarantees a right to privacy. The government of Hungary has been found to conduct surveillance on journalists, politicians, and other prominent figures using the Pegasus spyware program and other means. Government agencies do not require judicial authorization to engage in surveillance against suspected terrorist threats.

=== Right to education ===
Article XI of the Hungarian Constitution guarantees the right to an education, makes primary education compulsory, and provides for the government to provide assistance in seeking higher education. Article XXIX guarantees that students have the right to be educated in their native languages. The ability of higher education institutions to function independently has been eroded as education reform in Hungary has given the state increased control over universities. The Hungarian government has restricted the ability of universities to teach or study social sciences and eliminated the field of gender studies entirely. Academics are often targeted by state media as "Soros agents". In 2020, the European Court of Justice condemned violations of academic freedom by the Hungarian government. A ban on educational material to children regarding LGBT topics has been found to be a violation of educational rights by Amnesty International.

== Human trafficking ==
Hungary is a source of and trafficking point for human trafficking. In 2020, the government adopted a national strategy to combat human trafficking through 2023. As of 2021, the U.S. Department of State classifies Hungary's initiatives to combat human trafficking in the second of four tiers, indicating that its efforts are insufficient but improving. Hungary's initiatives have been found to be insufficient in regard providing assistance for victims of trafficking, including measures to prevent re-victimization. Human trafficking is governed by Article 192 of the criminal code, which penalizes human trafficking with up to ten years in prison or twenty years for the trafficking of children. The Romani population of Hungary in particular has been found to be disproportionately affected by human trafficking.

The most vulnerable groups regarding human trafficking in Hungary include those in poverty, under-educated young adults, the Romani people, single mothers, asylum-seekers, unaccompanied children, and the homeless. Child trafficking is not investigated separately in Hungary, and child victims have less access to resources for trafficking victims. A criminal charge for child sex trafficking in Hungary requires an act of "force, fraud, or coercion", limiting the ability to prosecute child sex traffickers and resulting in children being prosecuted for prostitution. Migrants and refugees are also disproportionately affected by human trafficking in Hungary. Identification of trafficking victims does not extend to those without residency, and the Hungarian government conducts less screening for trafficking indicators among migrants. Strict measures against asylum-seekers has increased their vulnerability to human trafficking.

== Discrimination ==
=== Ethnic minority rights ===
Right-wing populism has contributed to human rights issues regarding xenophobia, hate crimes, and discrimination against minorities. In 2016, the citizens of Hungary were found to be more opposed to refugees during the 2015 European migrant crisis than those of any other country. Romani people face significant discrimination in Hungary, including in workplaces and schools. The government of Hungary is accused of illegally separating Romani children from their families and placing them in long-term state care. Romani students are segregated in schools and sometimes relegated to schools for children with mental disabilities.

=== Freedom of religion ===
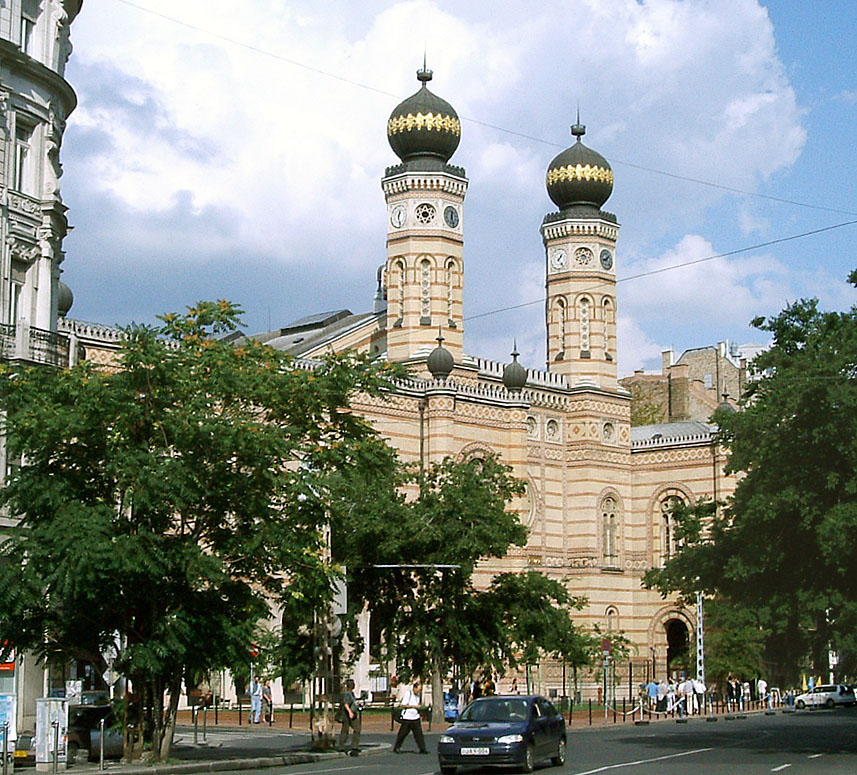
The Dohány Street Synagogue in Budapest, the largest synagogue in Europe.

The constitution outlines the right to freedom of religion in Article VII, guaranteeing the right to choose one's religious beliefs and practice or teach them in public and private life. Article XV guarantees that religion can not be a basis for a limitation of one's rights. Act C of 2011 and its 2018 amendment set requirements for a religious organization to be recognized by the government and receive benefits from the state. Hungary has historically been a country of religious pluralism, and the first law guaranteeing the right to freedom of religion was passed in 1895, though state atheism was enforced under the Hungarian People's Republic.

Hungarian religious law has been accused of discriminating against minority religious groups. Act C of 2011 revoked legal status from hundreds of religious organizations when passed, and it grants the National Assembly the final decision of whether a religious organization can be registered under the highest tier of recognition. The European Court of Human Rights found that the law violated the right to freedom of religion in 2014. The Orbán government has been criticized as antisemitic and Islamophobic. Government messaging spreads George Soros conspiracy theories that contribute to antisemitism in the country. The Hungarian government has also been accused of enforcing Christianity, with the Hungarian Constitution describing Christianity as a critical aspect of the Hungarian nation.

=== LGBT rights ===
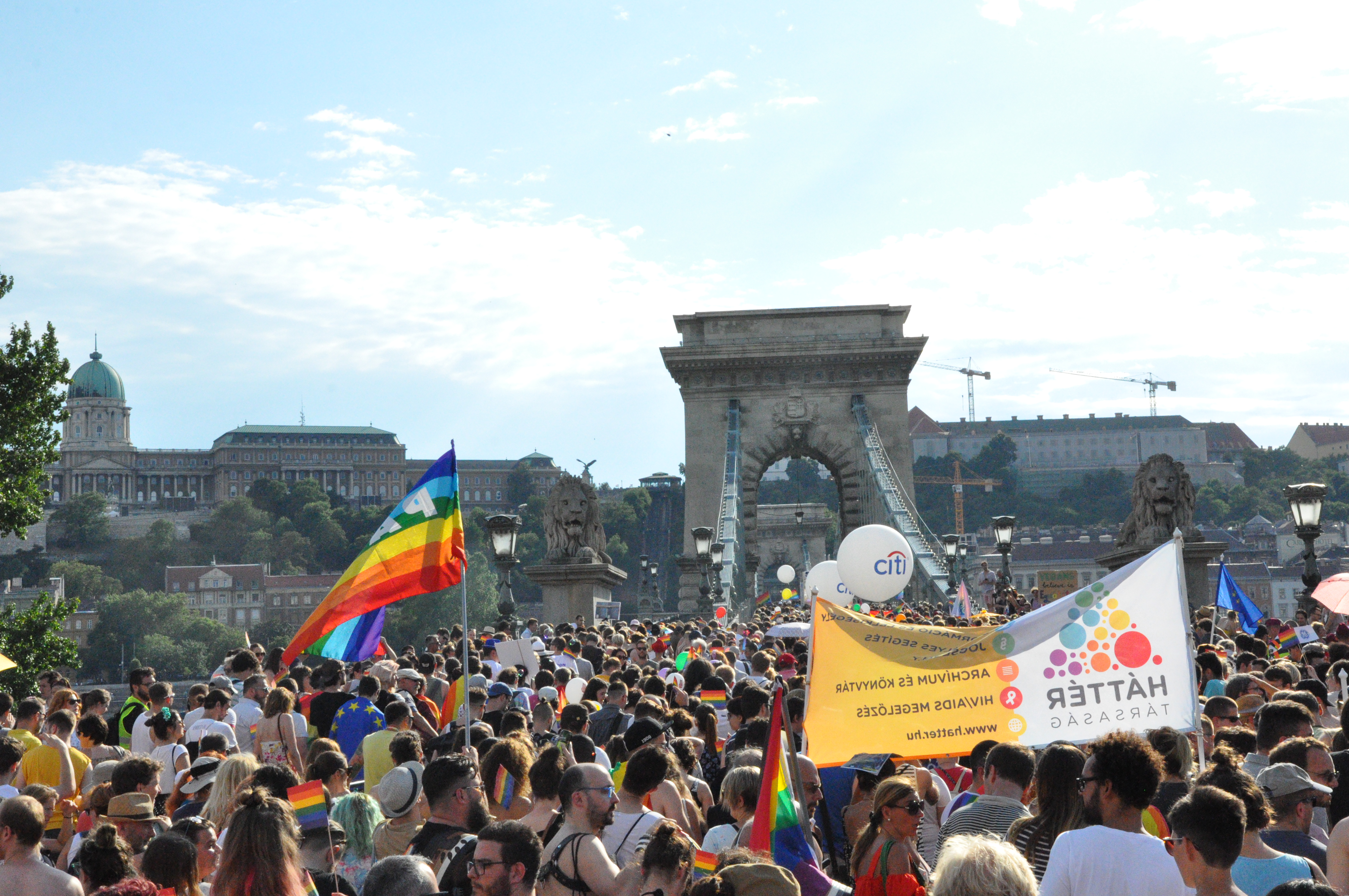
Budapest Pride 2017.

Homosexual activity was decriminalized for men 21 and older in 1961, and the age was lowered to 18 in 1978. Unregistered cohabitation has been recognized since 1996. The Constitutional Court ruled that homosexual activity could not be restricted by an age other than the age of consent in 2002. The Orbán government has worked to restrict LGBT rights in Hungary. Article L of the 2011 Hungarian constitution defines marriage as one man and one woman, effectively outlawing same-sex marriage. In 2020, Hungary banned recognition of transgender people and banned adoption by same-sex couples. In 2021, restrictions were applied to promotion and portrayal of LGBT diversity on penalty of fines.

=== Women's rights ===
The constitution guarantees gender equality. Domestic violence and sexual violence are crimes in Hungary. The government of Hungary has refused to ratify the Istanbul Convention that establishes standards for combating violence against women. Gender discrimination is widespread in Hungary, and many government policies strengthen gender discrimination regarding domestic and workplace roles. The Minister for Family Affairs has discouraged women from seeking fulfillment through the same career paths as men. Women are underrepresented in government, holding only 26 of 199 National Assembly seats in 2021.

== Human rights organizations in Hungary ==
=== Hungarian Helsinki Committee ===
The Hungarian Helsinki Committee is a human rights organisation that protects human dignity through legal and public activities. The HHC was founded in 1989, and it provides help to refugees, detainees and victims of law enforcement violence.

=== Hungarian Civil Liberties Union ===
The Hungarian Civil Liberties Union is a human rights NGO, founded in 1994.

== See also ==
- 2025 Hungarian Pride ban
- Human rights in Europe
- Hungarian anti-LGBTQ law
- Hungary in the European Union
- Politics of Hungary

== Bibliography ==
- Drinóczi, Tímea; Bień-Kacała, Agnieszka (2021). Illiberal Constitutionalism in Poland and Hungary: The Deterioration of Democracy, Misuse of Human Rights and Abuse of the Rule of Law. Taylor & Francis. doi:10.4324/9781003175353. ISBN 9781000428766.
