= Viktória Radványi =

Hungarian LGBTQ+ activist

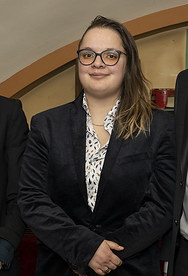
- Radvanyi in 2023
- Occupations: Pride parade executive; LGBTQ+ activist
- Organization: President of Budapest Pride
- Awards: Time 100 Next 2025 MTV EMA Generation Change Award

Viktória Radványi is a Hungarian LGBTQ+ activist who currently serves as the president of Budapest Pride. She has garnered international attention for her LGBTQ+ activism and organizing amidst the reduction in LGBTQ rights in Hungary. She was awarded the MTV EMA Generation Change award at the 2021 MTV Europe Music Awards, which were held in Budapest, and was named to the Time 100 Next in 2025.

== Biography ==
She grew up in a small town in the Hungarian countryside, and decided to become a volunteer upon moving to Budapest. She ultimately chose Budapest Pride, despite, at the time, believing herself to be straight. Her volunteer work helped her realize her sexuality.

By 2021, she had become a board member of Budapest Pride, where she helped lead activism against the government's anti-LGBTQ+ laws. One of her core focuses was the law that banned LGBTQ+ people from appearing in school materials or television shows rated at a level permissible for children under 18.

In this role, she also emphasized ensuring equity among all dividing lines and supporting the mental health of volunteers, community members, and allies. For her activism work, she was awarded a "Generation Change" award at the 2021 MTV Europe Music Awards, which were held in Budapest and disapproved of by the government.

Since then, she has helped to lead Budapest Pride's support of LGBTQ+ refugees from Ukraine during the Russo-Ukrainian war (2022–present), including organizing housing and informing refugees of the support they can receive from organizations like Budapest Pride, and has met with international officials including Samantha Power.

She became President of Budapest Pride in 2022. As president, she has headed Budapest Pride for several years, including during the 2025 Hungarian Pride parade ban, when she helped to ensure Budapest Pride went on despite the ban on pride parades and in fact broke attendance records with over 200,000 attendees.

She was listed in the Forbes Hungary 30 Under 30 in 2022. She was named to the Time100 Next in 2025: her profile was written by Hadja Lahbib.
