= Eckes =

Eckes is a surname.

== List of people with the surname ==
- Christian Eckes (born 2000), American professional stock car racing driver
- John N. Eckes (1844–1912), American Union Army soldier
- Nazan Eckes (born 1976), German television presenter

== Other ==
- Eckes-Granini Group

== See also ==
- Eek
- Ecke
