= Eke =

Eke or EKE may refer to:

== Places ==
- Eke, Gotland, Sweden
- Eke, Belgium, a town in Nazareth, Belgium

== Other uses ==
- Eke (name), a given name and surname
- Eke (dance), a Tongan group dance
- Ekit language
- Etugen Eke, a Mongolian and Turkic earth goddess
- Encrypted key exchange

== See also ==
- Eek (disambiguation)
- Eke silversword, a flowering plant
