= Halime Eke =

Turkish Muay Thai practitioner (born 1999)

- Born: 1999 (age 26–27); İzmir, Turkey
- Nationality: Turkish
- Division: 67 kg, 71 kg,
- Style: Muay Thai

Halime Eke
Medal record

Representing Turkey

Women's Muay Thai

IFMA World Championships
Silver medal – second place	2024 Patras	71 kg
Silver medal – second place	2023 Bangkok	67 kg

European Championship
Gold medal – first place	2024 Pristina	67 kg

Halime Eke (born 1999) is a Turkish Muay Thai practitioner competing in the 67 kg and 71 kg divisions. She is a European champion. In the early years of her career, she competed in kickboxing.

== Personal life ==
Halime Eke was born in 1999. She is native of İzmir, Turkey.

== Sport career ==
In the early years of her sport career, she performed kickboxing.

Eke won the silver medal in the 67 kg division at the 2023 FIMA Senior World Championships held in Bangkok, Thailand.

She took the silver medal in the Elite Senior 71 kg event at the 2024 IFMA World Muaythai Championships in Patras, Greece. At the 2024 European Championships in Pristina, Kosovo, she won the gold medal in the 67 kg division.
