= Gábor Szetey =

Hungarian politician

Gábor Szetey (born January 6, 1968) is a Hungarian former politician and former Secretary of State for Human Resources in the Gyurcsány government, a role he held from July 2006 to April 2009. He was the first openly gay Hungarian government member. He currently lives in north of Boston.

== Biography ==
After graduating from the Budapest University of Economic Sciences in 1992, Szetey was an adviser, later senior partner at consulting companies in Budapest. In 2000–01, he worked as an adviser and trainer at Time Manager International USA Inc., New York. Between 2001 and 2004 he was Human Resources Director at Kraft Foods Hungaria and Philip Morris Magyarország (Hungary). He continued his career at Massalin Particulares (Philip Morris Argentina) in 2005, but decided to return to Hungary in 2006, when he was invited to work in the Government of Hungary. In 2009, he quit politics and went to Spain where he is currently a company director.

== Personal life ==
Szetey publicly declared that he was gay at the opening night of Budapest's Gay and Lesbian Film Festival, on July 6, 2007. He is the first LGBT member of government in Hungary, and the second politician to come out, after Klára Ungár. Szetey's coming out came at the end of a speech on equality and tolerance:

When we can be proud of being Hungarian, Romanian, Jewish, Catholic, gay or straight... If we can be proud of our differences, we will be proud of our similarities. I believe in God. And I believe that all men and women have the right to love and be loved. Everywhere. Love has no party preference. Neither does happiness or choosing a partner. So: I am Gábor Szetey. I am European, and Hungarian. I believe in God, love, freedom, and equality. I am the Human Resources Secretary of State of the Government of the Republic of Hungary. Economist and HR director. Partner, friend, sometimes rival. And I am gay.

Amongst the audience was Klára Dobrev, the wife of Prime Minister Ferenc Gyurcsány, as well as four other members of the Hungarian cabinet. The Prime Minister supported Szetey on his blog and called for public debate about same-sex relationships in Hungary. Hungary currently recognises same-sex registered partnerships. After the coming out of Mr. Szetey, the Parliament adopted the Registered Civil Union Act, which came into force 1 January 2009.

In a subsequent interview, Szetey declared:

There is a small but vocal group of right-wing extremists which is intent on offending everyone... According to a survey, 51 percent of the respondents thought my speech was courageous and that it would improve the situation for homosexuals. It's strange that the conservatives, who attach such great importance to neighbouring states giving their Hungarian minorities equal rights, couldn't care less about equal rights in their own country.
