= Ilona Ékes =

Hungarian politician

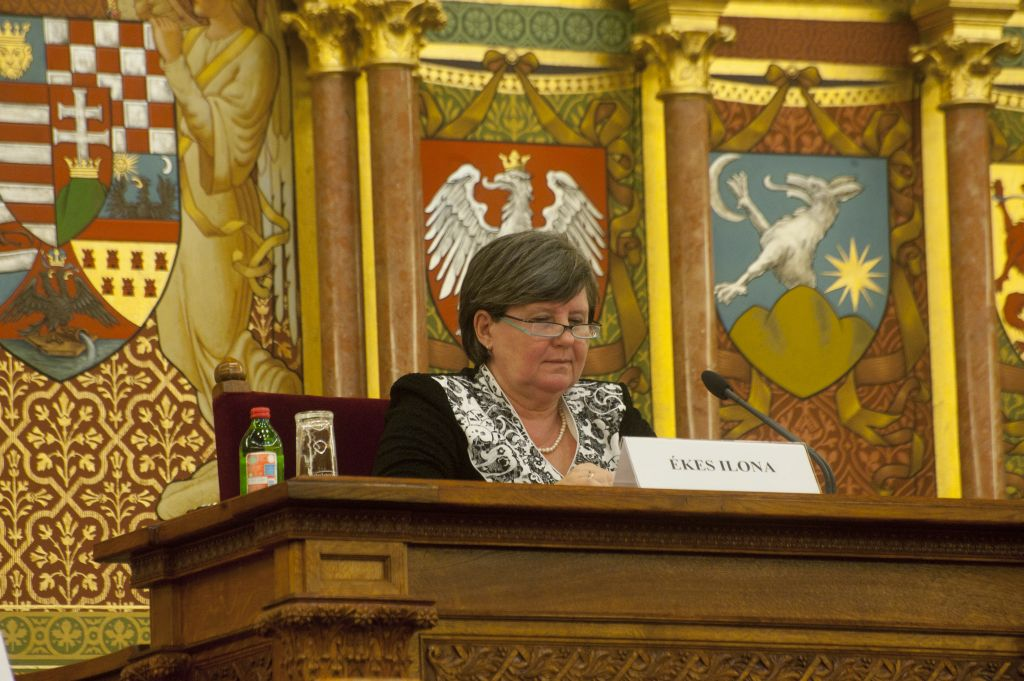

Member of the National Assembly
- In office 16 May 2006 – 5 May 2014

Personal details
- Born: 1953 (age 72–73) Budapest, Hungary
- Party: Fidesz
- Profession: politician

Ilona Ékes (born 1953) is a Hungarian politician, member of the National Assembly (MP) from Budapest Regional List between 2010 and 2014. She was also a Member of Parliament from her party, the Fidesz's National List between 2006 and 2010.

She was a member of the Committee on Human Rights, Minority, Civic and Religious Affairs from 19 October 2006 to 5 May 2014.

In 2009, Ékes, wrote to the police to ban a gay pride event in Budapest, saying that homosexuality was a mental illness and demonstrators would scandalise people, as they did in previous years, when homosexual activists imitated sexual intercourse on stage and other activists were allegedly blasphemous. According to Ékes, the demonstrations would harm youngsters, whose school season was to start on the same day. In 2025, The Hungarian parliament passed a law that could ban Pride.
