= Harrison Eke =

English footballer

Personal information
- Date of birth: February 1888
- Place of birth: Oakington, England
- Date of death: 30 April 1917 (aged 29)
- Place of death: Bexleyheath, England
- Position(s): Inside-right

Senior career*
Years	Team	Apps	(Gls)
- St. Mary's Cray
1913	Southampton	1	(0)
- *Club domestic league appearances and goals

Harrison Eke (February 1888 – 30 April 1917) was an English professional footballer who played as an inside-right in the Southern Football League for Southampton.

== Personal life ==
Eke worked as a milkhand. On 21 September 1914, a month after the outbreak of the First World War, he enlisted in the Royal Fusiliers. Serving as a private, Eke contracted tuberculosis during service and was medically discharged on 7 June 1916. He died of the disease on 30 April 1917 in Bexleyheath and was buried in Bexleyheath Cemetery.

== Career statistics ==
Appearances and goals by club, season and competition
Club	Season	Division	League		FA Cup		Total	
Club	Season	Division	Apps	Goals	Apps	Goals	Apps	Goals
Southampton	1913–14	Southern League First Division	1	0	0	0	1	0
Career total			1	0	0	0	1	0
