= József Ékes =

Hungarian politician (1951–2025)

Member of the National Assembly
- In office 18 June 1998 – 5 May 2014

Personal details
- Born: 15 August 1951 Ajka, Hungary
- Died: 14 October 2025 (aged 74)
- Party: Fidesz
- Other political affiliations: Entrepreneurs' Party; MDF
- Children: 3
- Profession: Politician

József Ékes (15 August 1951 – 14 October 2025) was a Hungarian politician who was a member of the National Assembly (MP) for Ajka (Veszprém County Constituency I) between 2010 and 2014. Formerly he also represented Ajka from 1998 to 2006. He was a Member of Parliament from Fidesz National List between 2006 and 2010.

== Personal life and death ==
Ékes was born in Ajka on 15 August 1951. He worked in different positions as a skilled power industrial worker for the Ajka Power Plant Repair and Maintenance Company for 23 years. He acquired a certificate equivalent to higher educational qualifications in trade and tourism management. He lived in Germany and Austria for some time. He completed an enterprise development course and a trade management course in England in 1994.

He joined the Entrepreneurs' Party in 1991. He ran in the 1994 parliamentary elections as a candidate of the Liberal Civic Alliance - Entrepreneurs' Party. In the local elections in December 1994 he was elected representative, then deputy mayor of Ajka. He was founder and chairman of New Atlantis Regional Development Association in 1996. He has been a member of the Veszprém County Development Council and the Central Transdanubian Regional Development Council since their establishment in November 1997.

In the 1998 parliamentary elections he secured a seat as joint candidate of Fidesz and the Hungarian Democratic Forum (MDF) representing Constituency 1, Ajka, Veszprém County. In the 1998–2002 cycle he was mayor of Ajka. He presided over the Entrepreneurs' Party from April 1999. In 2001 he was elected co-chairman of Békejobb Democratic Union but he soon resigned from his function. He has been a member of the Hungarian delegation to OSCE since 2000, a function he retained after the change of government.

During the 2002 general elections he managed to retain his seat as incumbent MP for Ajka. He was active in the Environment Committee. He was deputy chairman of the Regional Development Committee until 1 November 2003, and since then, he had been a member of the Committee on Human Rights, Minorities and Religion. He had been deputy leader of the party group in Parliament since 17 September 2002. He had been a deputy to the Parliamentary Assembly of the Council of Europe since September 2002. He was an observer delegated to the European Parliament by the Hungarian Democratic Forum since 12 April 2003. He joined the Lakitelek Working Group on 21 June 2004. At the same time he announced with other faction members to quit the faction and continued as an independent MP until the end of the parliamentary cycle. He secured a seat in Parliament in the 2006 general elections from the national list.

Four years later, he became MP for Ajka again. He was elected as a member of the Committee on Audit Office and Budget and Committee on European Affairs on 14 May 2010.

Ékes died on 14 October 2025, at the age of 74.
