= Michael Eke =

British criminal

Michael Eke (born 1968) is a former employee of Cambridgeshire Police who received an MBE that was later stripped following his conviction for fraud.

A native of March, Cambridgeshire, Eke had created bogus events for young children and gained thousands of pounds in National Lottery grants that funded the non-existent schemes. He had received the MBE in 2003 but was first suspected of fraud as part of the RAF (due to his handling of the ATC Squadron he commanded), and a subsequent police investigation two years later. Eke had gained false references to get his job as a stationery manager and then stole computers from the police.

Eke was found guilty of theft and deception at Norwich Crown Court on 30 August 2006. He was sentenced to 18 months in prison on 3 October and stripped of his MBE on 28 November.

He was also ordered to pay £26,935 to the March Air Training Corps (of which he was officer commanding) and £13,325 to Awards for All, a lottery grants scheme. To this date, he is the only member of the ATC to have been court-martialed.

His sister, Mrs Beryl Hudson, disowned him, claiming he had stolen thousands of pounds from his dying mother, and then took his children on a day trip to Hunstanton the day she died. He was released from prison in July 2007.
