= Carl Ecke =

Piano manufacturing company

Carl Ecke was a German piano brand from Prussia during the 19th and 20th century. The production started in Posen (Poznan), in 1843. At first only grand pianos were made by this company, but in 1870 it started making upright pianos as well. The company was then expanded and in 1873 moved to Berlin, and later also to Dresden.

The signature on the pianos changed over the years:

- Carl Ecke, Posen (until about 1890)
- Carl Ecke, Berlin & Posen (Berlin u. Posen) (in 1870s, 1890s, and about 1900)
- Carl Ecke, Berlin, Dresden, Posen (in 1890s, also about 1908)
- Carl Ecke, Berlin – Dresden (after 1895)
- Carl Ecke, Berlin (in 1885, after 1905, and regularly in the 1930s).
