= Eek =

Eek or EEK may refer to:

== People ==
- Karl Morten Eek (born 1988), Norwegian footballer
- Maria Magdalena Eek (1733–1800), Finnish pastry chef
- Piet Hein Eek (born 1967), Dutch designer

== Places ==
- Eek, Alaska
- Eek Airport, Alaska
- Eek River, Alaska

== Other uses ==
- E484K (nicknamed "Eek"), a variant of SARS-CoV-2 (the virus that causes COVID-19)
- Eek, a character in the animated television series Eek! The Cat
- EEK (band), an Egyptian musical group headed by Islam Chipsy
- Estonian kroon, a former currency of Estonia
- Workers Revolutionary Party (Greece) or EEK, a political party in Greece

== See also ==
- EKE (disambiguation)
- Eek-A-Mouse (born 1957), Jamaican reggae musician
