= Hungarian Pride parade ban =

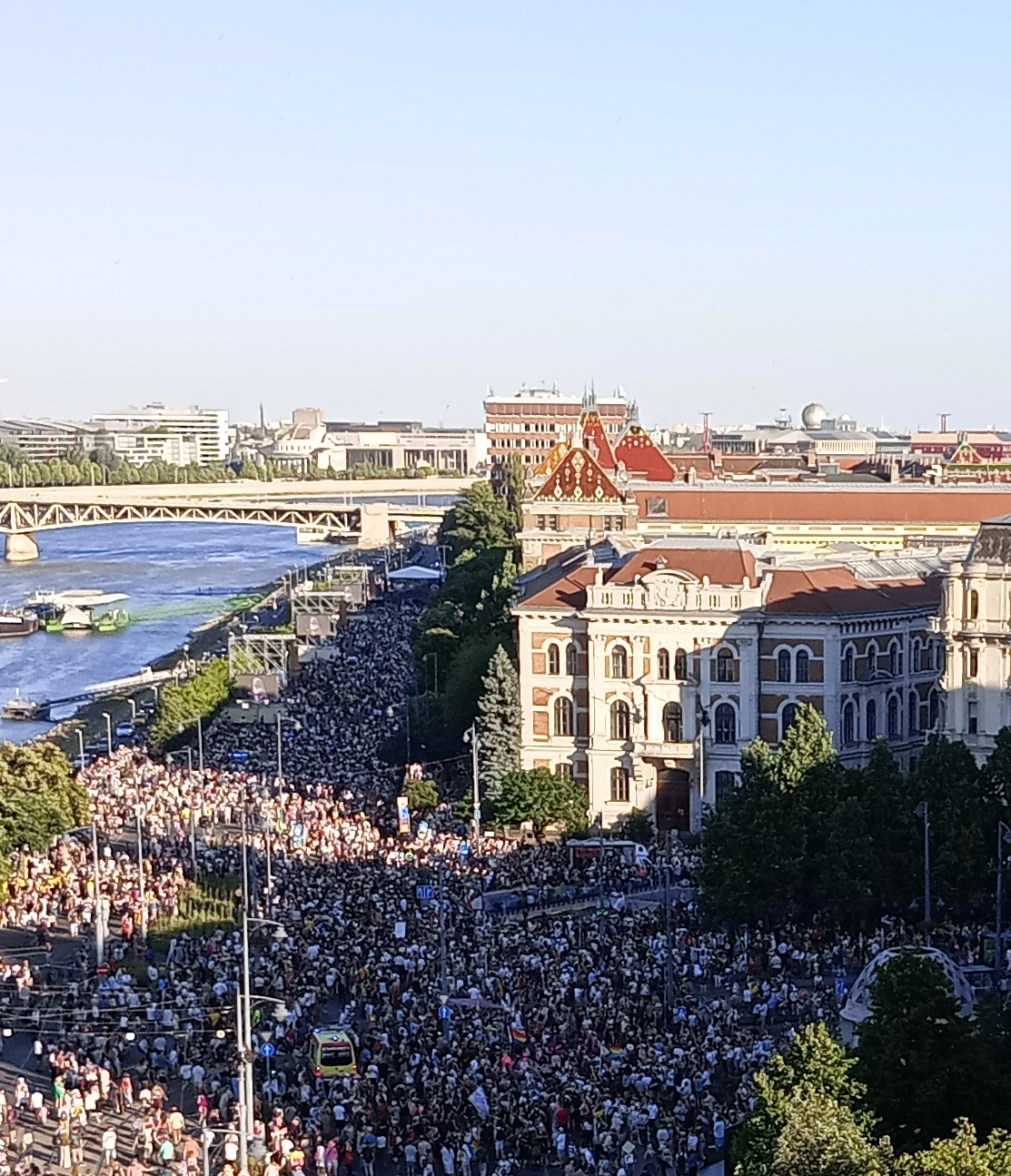
A view of the 2025 Budapest Pride in its later stage from the lookout above Gellért Hill Cave

On 18 March 2025, the Hungarian Parliament voted in favor of a bill which bans holding or attending assemblies that violate the law on the protection of children, which forbids promoting or displaying homosexuality or gender change to persons under the age of 18, therefore banning Pride parades. Participants may receive a fine ranging from 6,500 forints (€16) to 200,000 forints (€500), while organizers can face up to one year in prison. The bill also authorizes police to use facial recognition systems to identify participants.

Protests broke out in multiple Hungarian and Western European cities, with hundreds or thousands of protestors attending. Independent MP Ákos Hadházy organized a protest every week between 25 March and 19 July 2025.

The 2025 Budapest Pride was held on 28 June despite the police banning it, and between 100,000 and 200,000 people were present, many of whom were first-timers who attended not only in support of sexual minorities' rights, but also for the country's democratic future. This parade became Hungary's largest anti-government demonstration in years, with the organizers saying participants had arrived from 30 different countries. The police stated that they will not start procedures against participants. Another Pride march was held on 4 October with seven to eight thousand attendees in Pécs, the only rural city that holds an annual Pride parade.

== Background ==
On 15 June 2021, a law prohibiting promoting or portraying homosexuality or sex reassignment to minors and limiting sexual education in schools was passed by the Hungarian Parliament. Referred to in English as the Hungarian anti-LGBTQ law, the bill sparked outrage both nationally and internationally for equating LGBTQ people with pedophiles. One of the country's biggest book distributors, Líra, was fined 12 million forints (€32,000) for violating the law which requires books dealing with LGBTQ issues in any form to be wrapped in transparent film and not be included in the section of books intended for adolescents.

In March 2025, Prime Minister of Hungary Viktor Orbán announced in his annual State of the Nation address in February that the constitution will state that a person is either a man or a woman, and said "I advise the organizers of Pride not to bother preparing for this year's parade. It would be a waste of money and time."

The far-right party Our Homeland Movement called for a ban on LGBTQ pride marches on multiple occasions before.

== Amendments to the law ==
External videos
- The vote on the amendment to the law on assembly
- The vote on the constitutional amendment

On 17 March, an amendment to the law on assembly was submitted, which makes it an infraction punishable by fines ranging from 6,500 forints (€16) to 200,000 forints (€500) to hold or attend an assembly that violates the prohibition set out in the law on the protection of children, which forbids promoting or displaying homosexuality and gender change to persons under the age of 18. The amendment also states that the money collected from fines must be used for child protection purposes, and allows the police to use facial recognition systems in order to identify the participants. Organizers face punishments of up to one-year imprisonment. The amendment enjoyed special procedure, so that the proposal was debated on, and the final vote was held on the next day.

On 18 March, the Parliament voted in favor of the amendment by 136 votes in favor (Note: Fidesz-KDNP, Jobbik, and Our Homeland Movement MPs; Péter Balassa and Imre Ritter) and 27 votes against. During the vote, Momentum Movement MPs and Ákos Hadházy (independent) lit smoke bombs, played the Soviet national anthem, and threw pictures of Viktor Orbán and Vladimir Putin kissing. The opposition MPs chanted "We won't allow it!" Gábor Bányai, an MP who survived COVID-19, received emergency medical care. President of Hungary Tamás Sulyok signed it into law on the same day. The MPs who disrupted the vote later received fines totaling up to 82 million forints (€200,000) and were banned from 10 sessions of the Parliament by Speaker of the National Assembly László Kövér; Hadházy's fine of 12 million forints (€30,000) was paid off by donations within two days. They appealed the decision, and the Parliament confirmed it. (Note: Fidesz-KDNP MPs voted yes, Our Homeland Movement MPs abstained, and opposition parties voted no.) This was the first time since the fall of communism that an MP was banned from Parliament. It is the first ban on a Pride march in an EU nation.

On 14 April, the Parliament voted 140–21 to accept the fifteenth amendment to the constitution, which states – among other things – "Every child has the right to protection and care for their adequate physical, mental and moral development. This right takes precedence over all other fundamental rights, with the exception of the right to life", and that a person is either a man or a woman. According to the Chief of Staff, Gergely Gulyás, this is justified by common sense, as "people with families do not usually go near Pride". Momentum organized a protest to Kossuth Square unsuccessfully attempting to block the MPs from getting into the Parliament by blocking the entrance of the Parliament's parking garage, and they disturbed the vote in the Parliament with air horns. The president signed the amendment on the same day.

== Reactions ==
Mayor of Budapest Gergely Karácsony said that Budapest Pride will be held and it "could be bigger than ever". He gave a speech at the 2025 Vienna Pride, where he said "if Pride can be banned in an EU member state, then no EU citizen is safe". Alexandra Szentkirályi, leader of the Fidesz fraction of the General Assembly of Budapest, was also at Vienna Pride, and she posted that it was "brutal" and also shared pictures of naked men that were there. Then–Prime Minister Orbán commented: "Now that is what we do not want in our country!"

The organizers of Budapest Pride compared this amendment to fascism, and stated that they were still planning to hold the 2025 Pride march despite the ban.

The Hungarian Helsinki Committee, a non-governmental human rights organization, stated that the amendment violates several fundamental rights, especially the right to freedom of assembly, the prohibition of discrimination, and the right to the protection of personal data. Co-chair of the committee, András Kádár, said that there is no sociological data or scientific evidence to suggest that the mention of being gay or the public discussion of the sexual minorities' position in society has a negative impact on children. Tamás Dombos, a project coordinator at Háttér Society, a Hungarian LGBTQ rights group, said that this was a tactic to distract voters from more important issues, and that facial recognition could be used against other protests the government chooses to deem unlawful.

Michael O'Flaherty, Commissioner for Human Rights of the Council of Europe wrote "I call on the President of Hungary to veto the law", and he asked László Kövér, speaker of the National Assembly, to amend the bill. President of the European Commission Ursula von der Leyen called upon the Hungarian authorities to allow Budapest Pride. Orbán replied that they should stay out of the nation's affairs.

Future Prime Minister Péter Magyar, then leader of the largest opposition party Tisza Party, said that the government did this to divert attention from millions of Hungarians living in severe living crisis, and that if they get elected, they will protect the right of assembly. Many have criticized Magyar for not speaking up more firmly. Magyar said that he will not attend, but he called upon the police to protect the Hungarian people even if it means standing up against the arbitrariness of power.

Momentum Movement pledged to create a fund with which the fines could be paid off.

Volker Türk, the UN High Commissioner for Human Rights, called on the Hungarian authorities to repeal this and all other laws that discriminate against LGBTQ people.

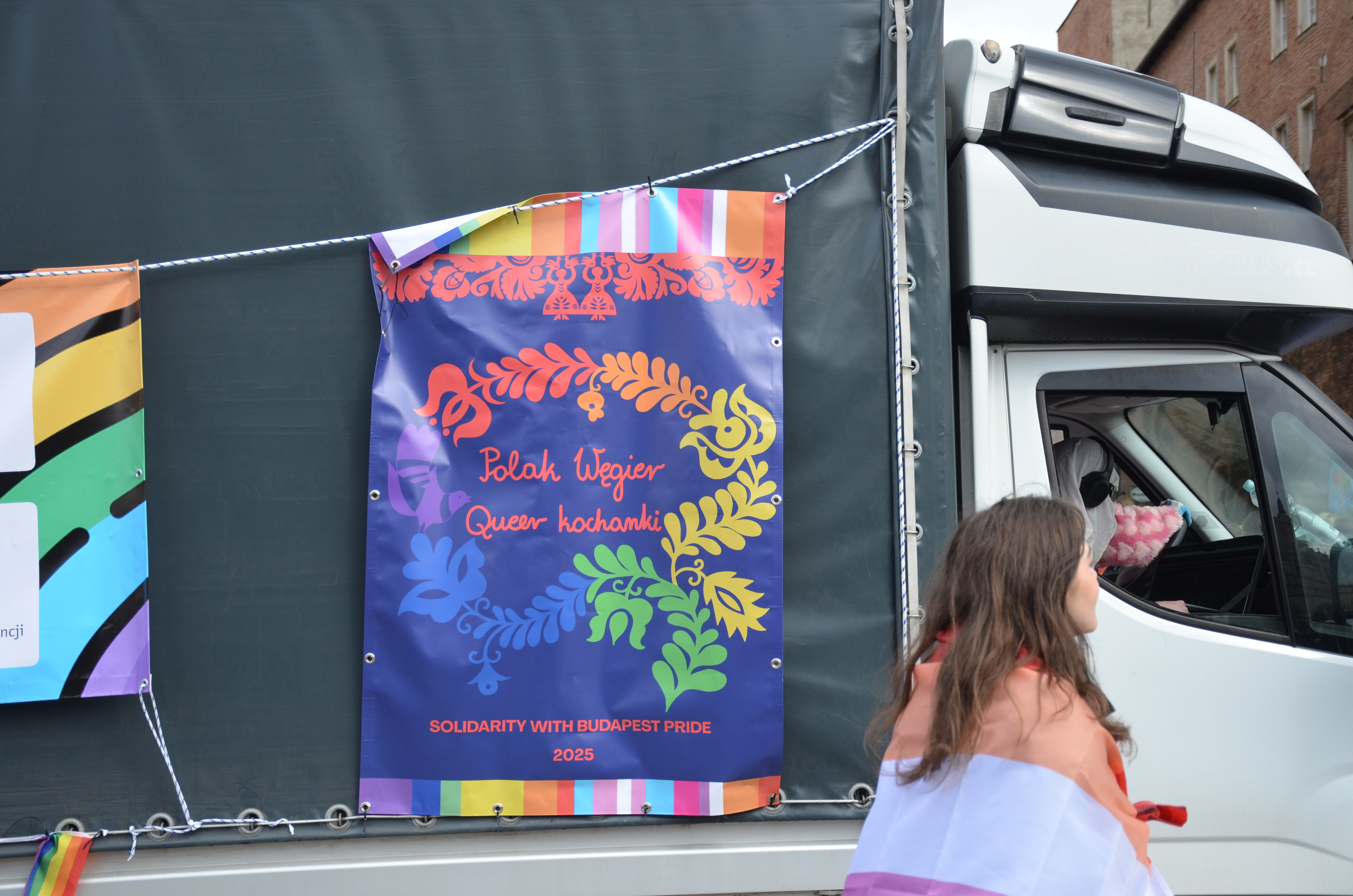
Banner of solidarity at the 2025 Kraków Equality March

Swedish Prime Minister Ulf Kristersson and Spanish Prime Minister Pedro Sánchez as well as Austrian Foreign Minister Beate Meinl-Reisinger, Belgian Foreign Minister Maxime Prévot, Irish Foreign Minister Simon Harris, Dutch Foreign Minister Caspar Veldkamp, Estonian Foreign Minister Margus Tsahkna, Finnish Foreign Minister Elina Valtonen and German EU Affairs Minister Anna Lührmann, on their respective X accounts, have all opposed the bill.

Thirty-three embassies have issued a joint statement in support of LGBTQ people's rights. Twenty EU countries have also made a similar joint statement. Seventy-one MEPs planned on attending the 2025 Budapest Pride despite the ban.

=== Protests and demonstrations ===
Momentum Movement organized a protest to Kossuth Square, in front of the Parliament, on 18 March at 17:00 (CET). After speeches were made by leaders of Momentum Lajos Lőcsei and Dávid Bedő, and independent MP Ákos Hadházy, the crowd moved to the Margaret Bridge to block it. They got to Jászai Mari Square, but could not get on the bridge due to the police blockade. The crowd grew larger by another protest starting from Liberty Square. Three men were arrested. The crowd dispersed at around 22:30, when the police started to identify people who stayed there.

On 19 March, a protest was held in Pécs by Amnesty International. More than 200 people attended, including Momentum.

Vienna Pride organized a protest in the Austrian capital on 20 March to express their solidarity toward the Hungarian Pride community. Hundreds of people attended and speeches were made by politicians from multiple Austrian parties. They also invited Hungarians to the 2025 Vienna Pride. Similar protests were held in front of the Hungarian consulate in Barcelona on 22 March with around a hundred people attending, and in Paris on 23 March with 50–100 people attending.

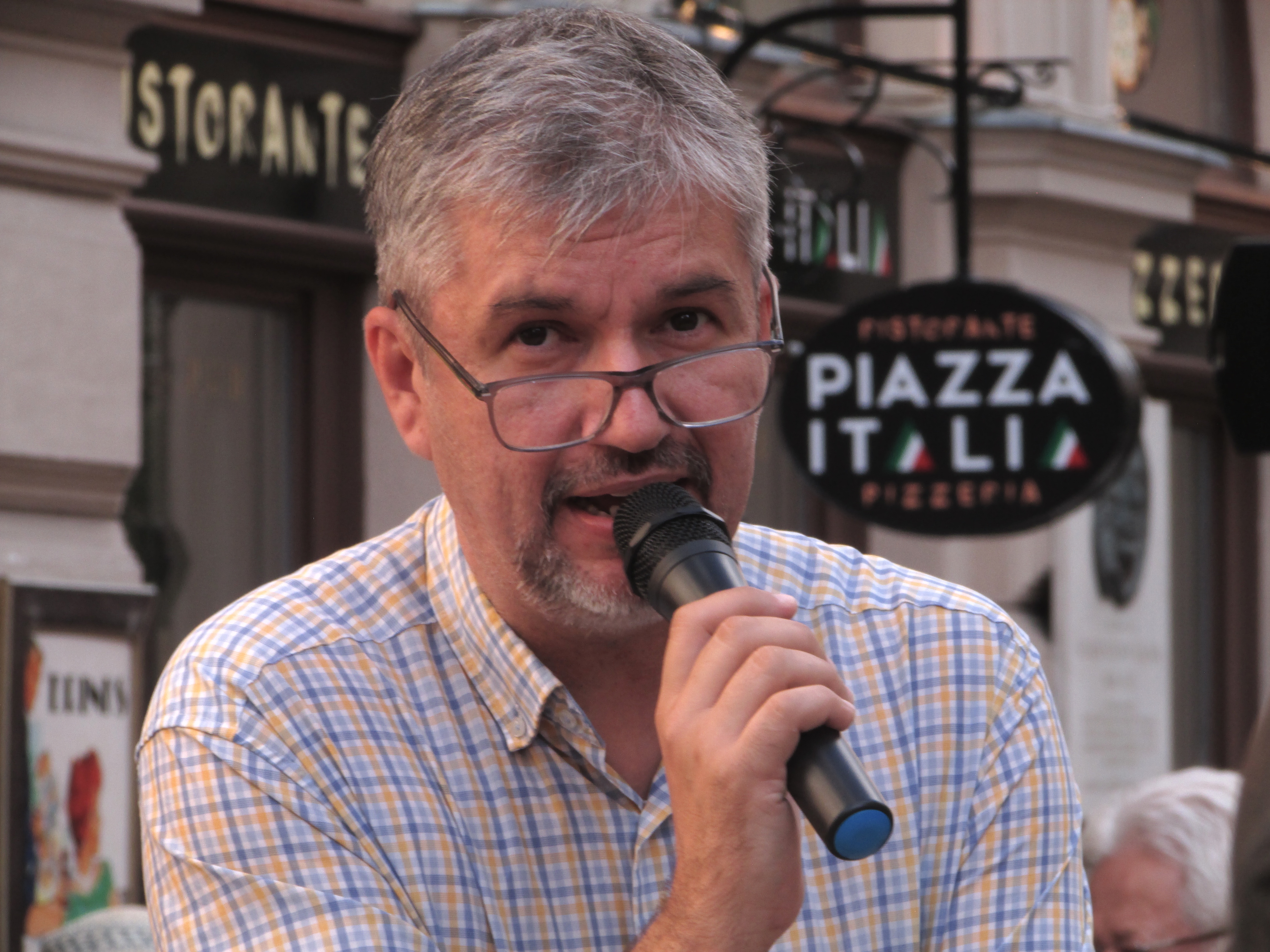
Hadházy organized a protest every week between 25 March and 19 July.

Hadházy announced another protest to the Elisabeth Bridge taking place on 25 March at 17:00. The police rejected their request for permission to hold this protest at that place due to it disrupting traffic, instead they allowed it on the Március 15. tér. The Curia later found that the reasoning was not enough to reject the request. Hadházy then announced that the protest will be held on the Ferenciek tere. At the protest, thousands of protestors gathered. Multiple speeches were made, then the protestors blocked the Elisabeth Bridge, Liberty Bridge, Petőfi Bridge, and Margaret Bridge. At 23:30, the police started to identify 289 of those who remained, two of them resisted.

On 29 March, a protest was held in Szeged. After speeches have been made, the 100–150 protestors blocked the Belvárosi Bridge. A protestor was fined 39,000 forints (€95) for stepping off the sidewalk, however, the police did not identify him at the scene, instead, he was identified via publicly available videos of the protest. An employee of the Hungarian Civil Liberties Union (TASZ) said that the police probably used facial recognition systems to identify him, even though the amendment that would allow this only entered into force later, on 15 April.

Another protest was announced by Hadházy to take place on 1 April at 17:00 (CEST) to the Elisabeth Bridge. After speeches have been made, the crowd made up of thousands went to block the Liberty Bridge, the Petőfi Bridge, and the Margaret Bridge. The policed used physical coercion to move protestors from the road to the sidewalk. At 20:30, the police started to push the crowd on the Liberty Bridge towards Pest, but at 21:00, the police blockade suddenly left from the bridge. At 22:45, the police started to identify those who remained on the Liberty Bridge.

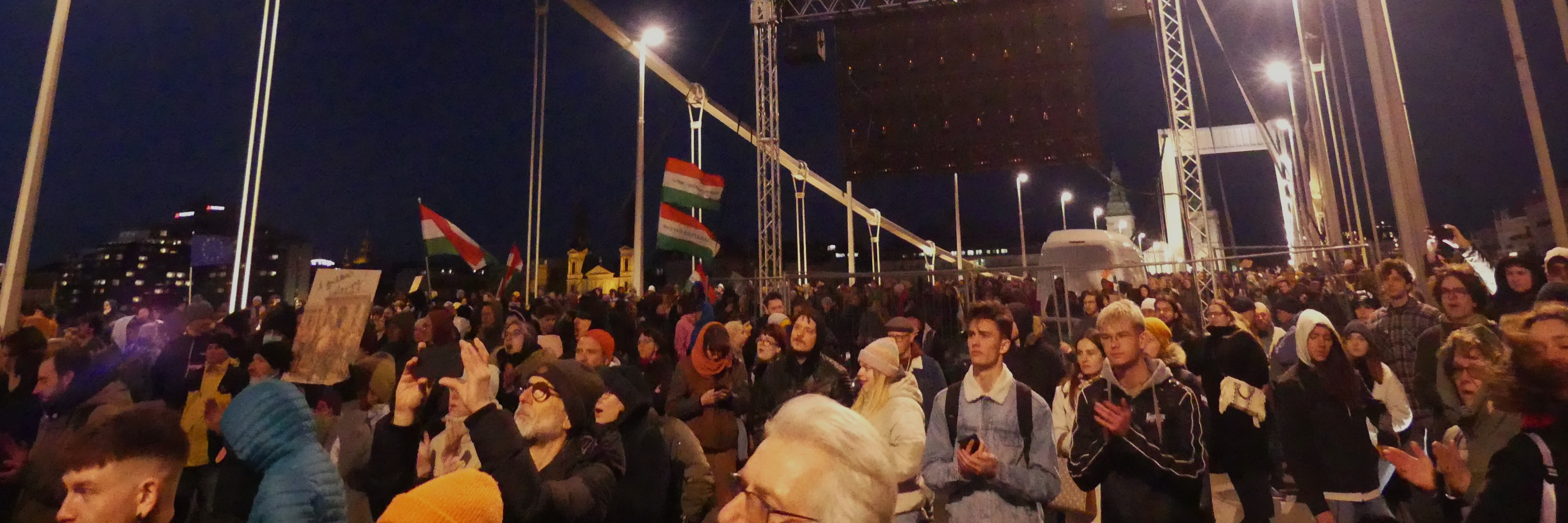
Protesters during the 8 April demonstration

Hadházy announced a 24-hour protest to take place on 8 April to the Elisabeth Bridge. Parallel to this protest, another one was held in Miskolc, with hundreds of people attending. The Budapest protest was intended to be held from 17:00 on 8 April to 22:00 on 9 April, but the police did not allow this citing disturbance of traffic, instead allowing it from 16:00 on 8 April to 04:00 on 9 April. This decision was appealed to the Curia, which upheld the actions of the police. At around 16:00, roughly a hundred university students gathered at the Mikszáth Square; after speeches were made, they joined Hadházy's protest. Thousands of people attended, and multiple speeches were made, including by Róbert Puzsér. At around 20:40, police did not allow protestors onto the Liberty Bridge, but they did after a few minutes. Some attempted to go to the Petőfi Bridge, but the police blockade did not allow that.

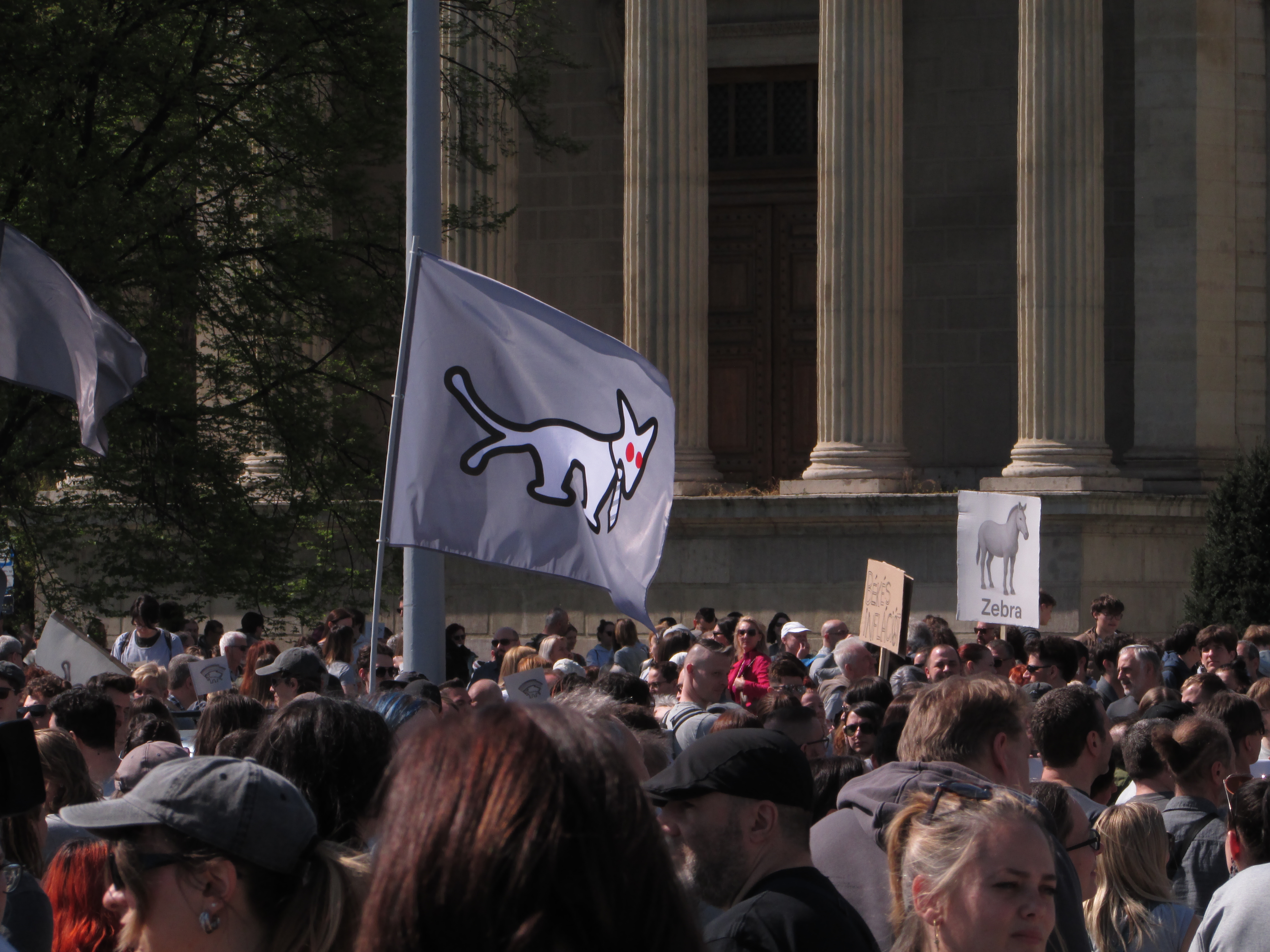
Crowd at MKKP's "Illiberal Pride"

The Hungarian Two-Tailed Dog Party (MKKP), a satire party, announced a demonstration taking place on 12 April named "Let everyone be the same", where participants were asked to come in gray shirts and carry gray flags. Also named "Illiberal Pride" or "Gray Pride", multiple speeches were made, including by the party's leader, Gergely Kovács.

Another 24-hour protest was announced by Hadházy to take place at 17:00 on 15 April at the Elisabeth Bridge. At 18:45, the protestors set off to the Castle Quarter. 30–40 protestors stayed for the night and slept in tents.

Hadházy announced another protest to take place on 22 April to the Elisabeth Bridge, but the police did not allow that, stating that the protest would cause unnecessary and disproportionate interference with the rights and freedoms of others, instead allowing it at Tabán; this was appealed to the Curia, who declined the appeal. Hadházy instead announced the protest to the Ferenciek tere, which the police also did not allow. At the protest, more than one hundred police officers were present. Some protestors sat down on the Liberty Bridge, they were identified by the police and dragged to the sidewalk.

Another protest was announced by Hadházy to take place on 1 May at 15:00 at the Elisabeth Bridge, which the police did not allow, instead allowing it at the Kossuth Square; this was appealed to the Curia. Hadházy made an online survey asking people whether he should hold the protest at the Kossuth Square or at the Elisabeth Bridge; the Kossuth Square was chosen. At the protest, Attila Császár, a reporter of M1, was surrounded by protestors. The protest was ended by Hadházy at 17:30; some of the protestors wanted to go to the Carmelite Monastery, but once they got on the Széchenyi Chain Bridge, they could not continue due to the police blockade. The protestors decided to turn around and go to the Ministry of Interior, but they could not get off the bridge because there was another police blockade on the other side. 110 of the protestors who were thus trapped on the bridge were identified by the police.

Hadházy announced another protest to take place on 6 May at 17:00 at the Ferenciek tere, which was allowed by the police. He stated that there will not be speeches, and the protest will be one-hour long. After an hour-long speech by Hadházy, he asked the protestors to go to the Hungarian Academy of Sciences. Some protestors blocked the Elisabeth Bridge for around 20 minutes.

Another protest was held by Hadházy on 13 May at the Ferenciek tere. After his speech, the hundreds of protestors went to the Ministry of Foreign Affairs.

Hadházy announced another protest to take place on 20 May at 17:00 at the Fővám tér, because the police did not allow it to be held at the Ferenciek tere. After the speeches, Hadházy asked the hundreds of protestors to go to the Sovereignty Protection Office's Sánc Street building. The crowd could not get across the Liberty Bridge due to the police vehicles blocking it, so they instead chose to go there using the Vámház körút. They stopped at the Kossuth Square near the Parliament, then they could not get across Margaret Bridge either due to the police blockade there.

Another protest was held by Hadházy on 27 May at 17:00 at the Ferenciek tere. After speeches having been made by Hadházy, Ferencváros Mayor Krisztina Baranyi, and students mainly discussing Hungary's proposed law titled "Transparency of Public Life", (Note: Once passed by the Parliament, this law would allow the Sovereignty Protection Office to suggest the government to put foreign-funded organizations that threaten Hungary's sovereignty on a list. Once on the list, these organizations cannot collect 1% of tax donations and are required to request a "fully conclusive private document" from all of their donors stating that these funds did not come from abroad.) Hadházy asked the protestors to go to the Sovereignty Protection Office's Sánc Street building. There Hadházy wanted to give a flower to a police officer, but after the officer refused it, Hadházy threw the flower in the office's garden.

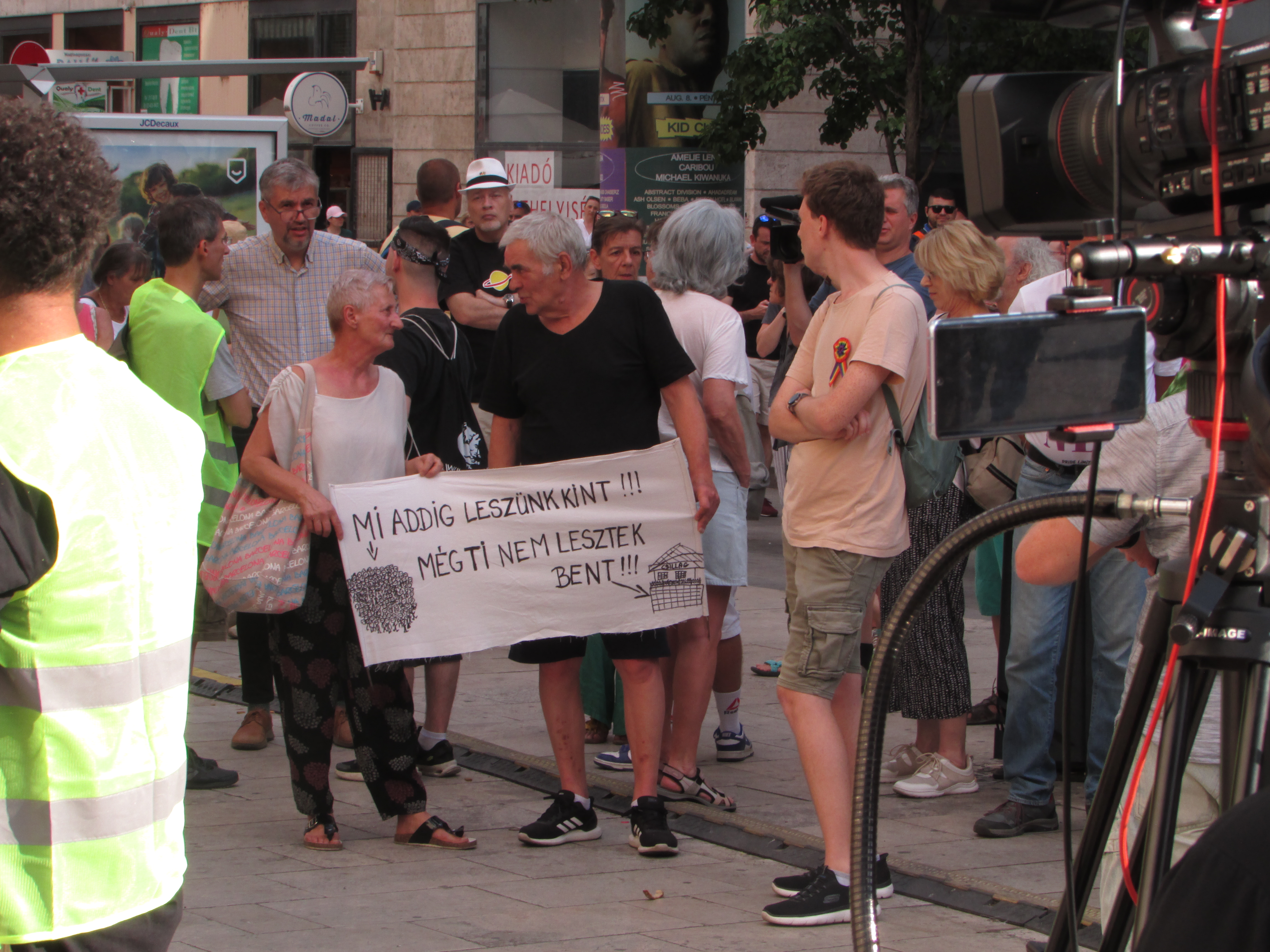
Anti-government banner at Hadházy's 18th protest "We will be outside, until you are inside"

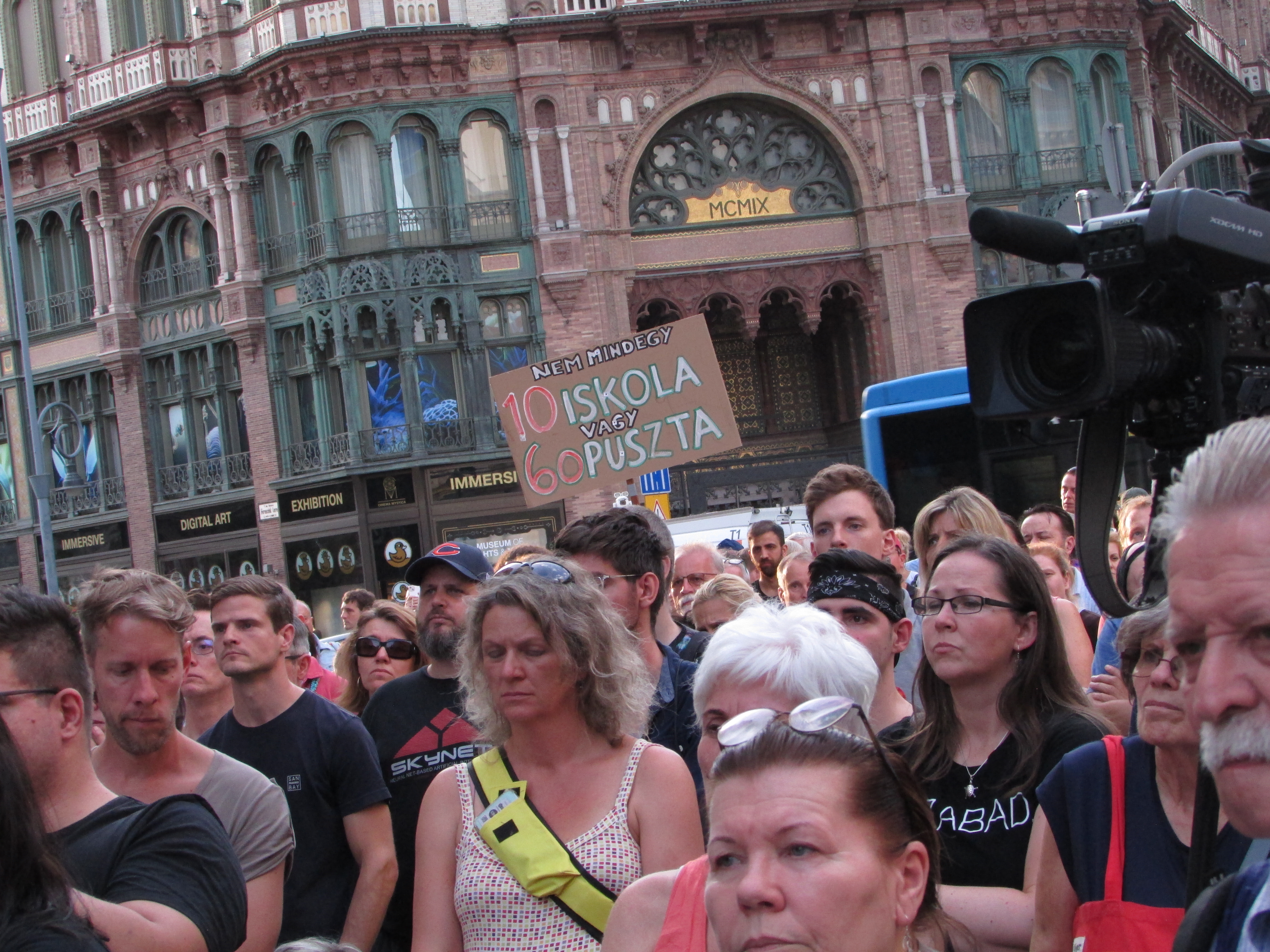
Protest sign at the 2 September protest "There's a difference between 10 schools and 60 plains [wordplay on Hatvanpuszta]"

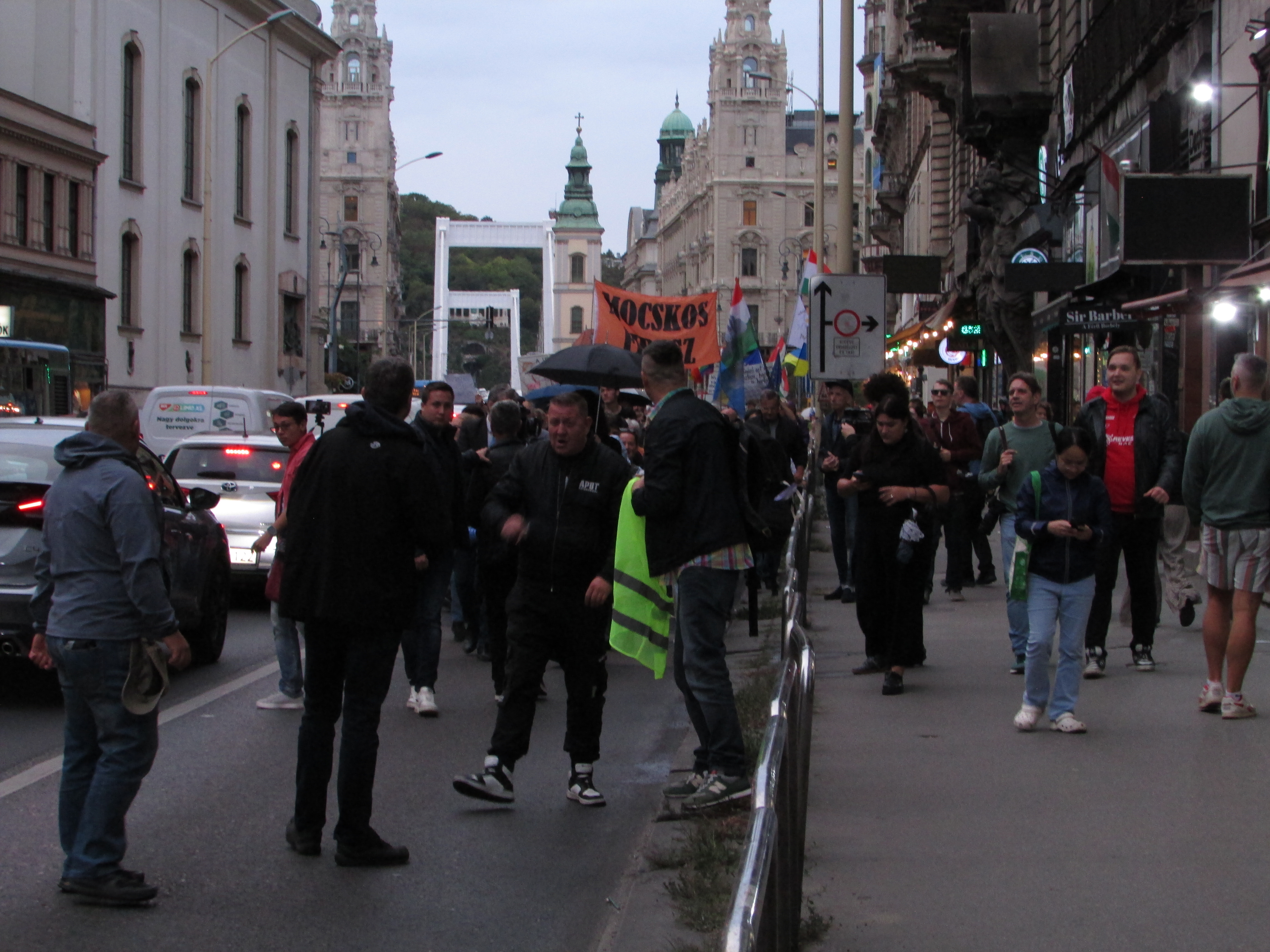
Protestors at the 16 September protest

On 1 June, five human rights organizations (Note: They were originally Amnesty International Hungary, Háttér Society, Hungarian Helsinki Committee, Szivárvány Misszió Alapítvány (lit. 'Rainbow Mission Foundation', the organizer of Budapest Pride), and TASZ, but Szivárvány Misszió Alapítvány left on 2 June.) wanted to hold a demonstration on the Andrássy út, but the police prohibited it, even though a smaller demonstration on 17 May at the same location was allowed. This prohibition was appealed to the Curia, which voided the prohibition. The police thus allowed the demonstration to be held, but at that point, it was too late, so they requested the date of the demonstration to be amended to 28 June (coinciding with Budapest Pride), but the police prohibited this request. After the Curia voided the prohibition, the police prohibited it once again. The official justifications that the police used to forbid this demonstration included pictures taken from previous Pride parades. The Curia upheld the prohibition on appeal.

Hadházy announced protests on 3, 17, 24 June; 1, 8, 19 July; 2 and 16 September at the Ferenciek tere. Hundreds to thousands of people attended these demonstrations, who then went to different symbolic places, such as the city hall, the public prosecutor's office, the commemorative plaque of Sándor Kopácsi, and several ministries. (Note: Multiple citations:)

== 2025 Budapest Pride ==
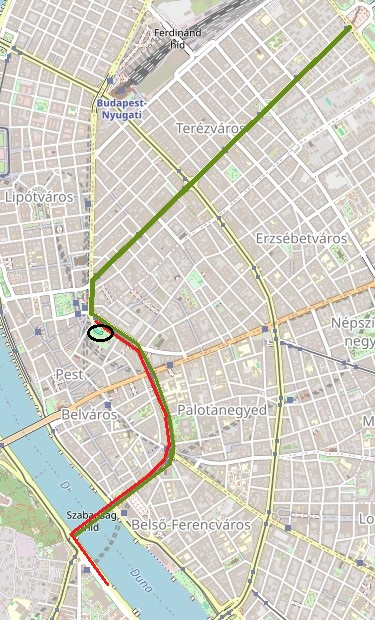
The planned paths and locations of assemblies and marches planned on 28 June 2025
30th Budapest Pride
Our Homeland Movement's march
Sixty-Four Counties Youth Movement's assembly

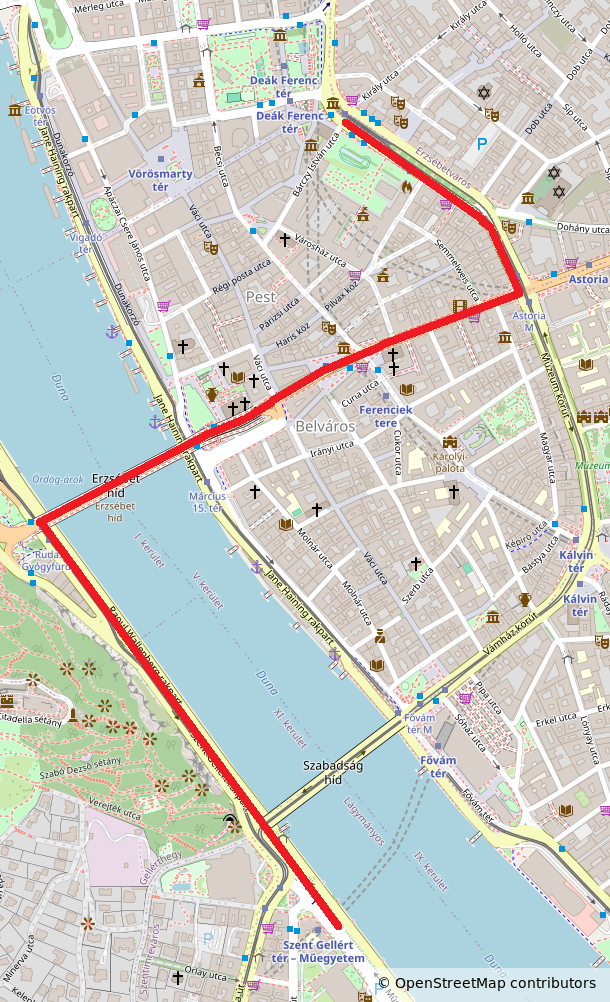
The actual path of Budapest Pride, going over the Elisabeth Bridge, and not the Liberty Bridge

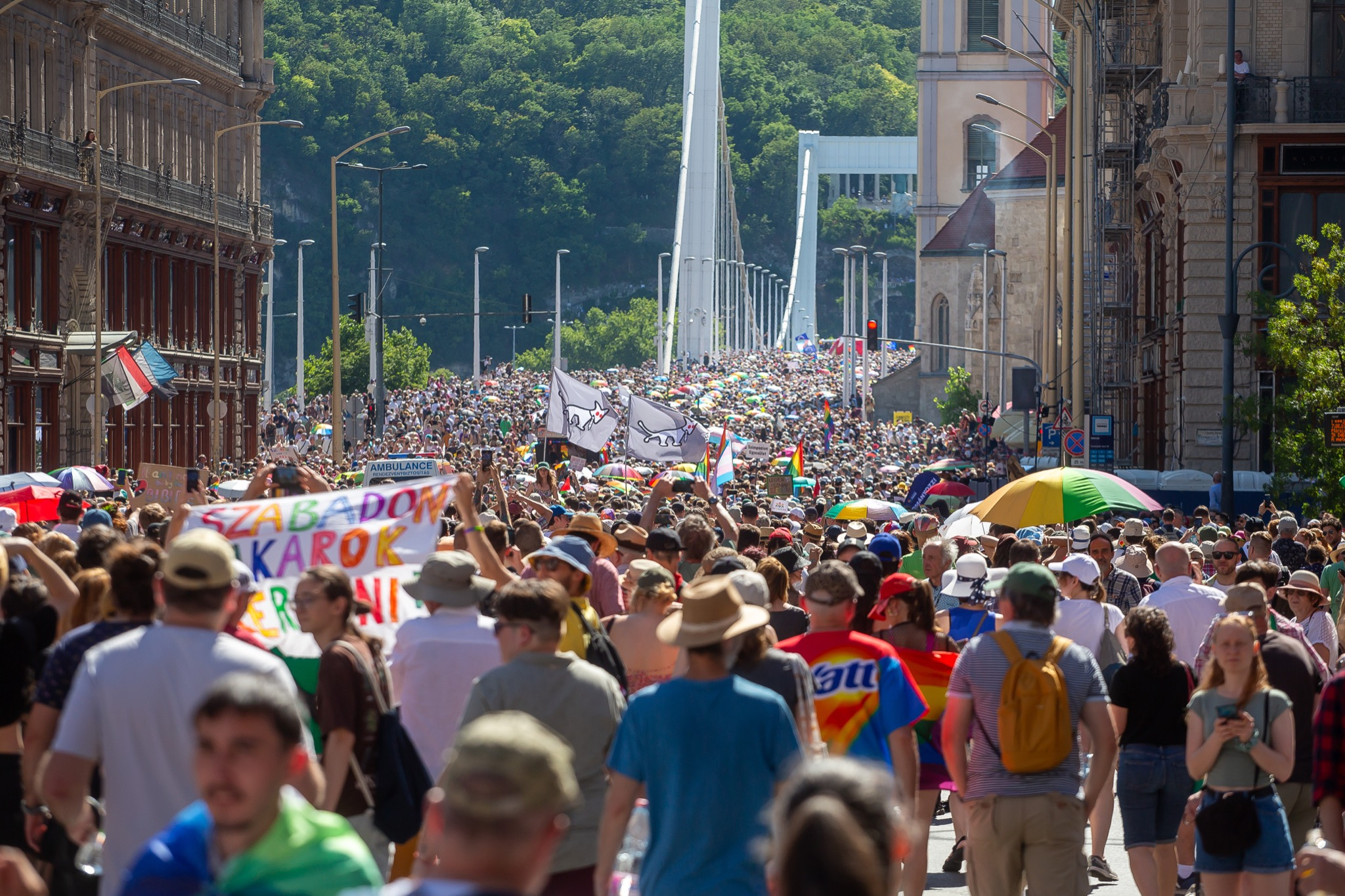
Thousands of people flooded the streets and the Elisabeth Bridge.

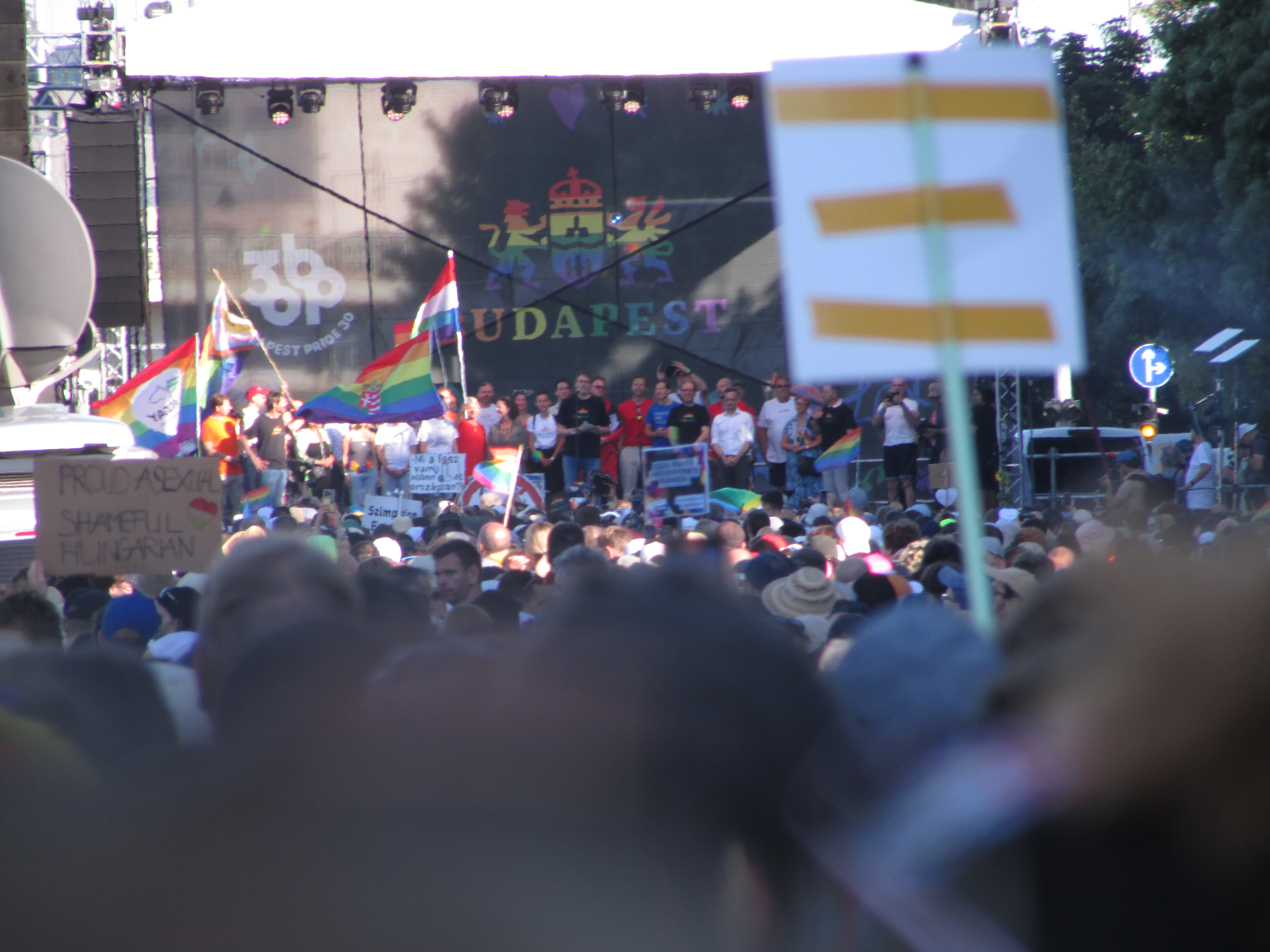
Karácsony giving his speech

The 30th Budapest Pride was held on 28 June by the Szivárvány Misszió Alapítvány (lit. 'Rainbow Mission Foundation') and Budapest's local government as a municipal event, reviving an earlier tradition of a freedom celebration in June each year to commemorate the withdrawal of Soviet troops. Karácsony argued that as a municipal event, it was not covered by the law on assembly, therefore the police could not prohibit it, but the police stated they would process this as any other assembly, and they prohibited it. The official justification included photos and videos of men kissing and drag queens, including a video which was not taken at a Pride parade. The organizers did not appeal the decision.

Minister of Justice Bence Tuzson warned Karácsony that he would face one year of imprisonment if he organized Budapest Pride in defiance of the ban, and he sent letters to multiple embassies notifying them that Pride was banned. Alexandra Szentkirályi stated she would bring the matter before the General Assembly for a decision on 25 June. The Fidesz faction submitted an amendment motion regarding Budapest Pride to every item on the agenda. Because of this, the Tisza faction chose not to attend, and so did the Fidesz faction. The assembly was postponed to 30 June, where members of the Fidesz faction gave out Pride flags to the other members, and spoke multiple times about Pride, drawing audience laughter. When asked whether they would aggressively make the crowd disperse, Viktor Orbán said "even if we disagree, we do not hurt each other".

Temporary cameras were installed along the path of the march and were removed immediately afterwards.

A press briefing was held the day before Budapest Pride by Karácsony; Budapest Pride spokesperson Máté Hegedűs; European Commissioner for Preparedness, Crisis Management, and Equality Hadja Lahbib; and Vice-President of the European Parliament Nicolae Ștefănuță.

On the morning of Budapest Pride, Orbán posted photo of his grandchildren with the caption: "They are the ones I am proud of." Péter Magyar also posted, saying: "If anyone gets hurt or injured in Budapest today, Viktor Orbán alone will be responsible."

The march started at Városháza park at 14:00. The planned path was: Károly körút, Múzeum körút, Liberty Bridge, then Műegyetem rakpart. However, the far-right Our Homeland Movement (MHM) had received permission from the police to hold an assembly at the same time as Budapest Pride from Heroes' Square to Liberty Bridge, so the Pride march had to be diverted to the Elisabeth Bridge. Karácsony said "It is interesting that the police says neo-Nazis can protest, but freedom-loving people cannot." Speeches were given by Kati Wolf, Karácsony, Judit Hernádi, Ștefănuță, Nikoletta Bogádi, Hella Zsirka, Patrícia Kovács, Judit Pogány, and foreign politicians and mayors. The march was concluded by Carson Coma's concert. The hosts were Kristóf Steiner and Ildikó Kovalcsik (Lilu).

Between 100,000 and 200,000 people participated in the event – last year, 35,000 people attended –, and many were first-timers. Many attendees held banners mocking Orbán. The organizers said participants had arrived from 30 different countries. Many attendees stated that this Pride march was not just for the protection of sexual minorities' rights, but also for the country's democratic future. Around 70 MEPs attended, most of them belonging to the liberal Renew Europe, Socialists & Democrats, the Left, and Greens groups, along with a single EPP member from Ireland, Maria Walsh. Other MEPs participating were Li Andersson and Alice Bah Kuhnke. Swedish activist Greta Thunberg also participated. Lahbib held meetings with local civil society organizations in Hungary but did not attend the march. No one was arrested or fined for attending Budapest Pride. Lóránt Horváth attorney stated that the police may not fine attendees, because the police did not notify them of the unlawfulness of the assembly nor that they are to leave. Klára Dobrev turned herself in, and Vice President of the MHM Előd Novák reported Karácsony. Proceedings were started against Lili Pankotai, which were terminated. Due to contradictory communications from the police and the organizers, the police stated that they will not start procedures against Pride attendees. The Ministry of Interior stated that facial recognition systems will not be used to punish attendees.

The Pride parade became the country's largest anti-government demonstration in years. MEP Rasmus Nordqvist said: "All together we made it very clear that attacks on freedom and constitutional rights are unacceptable. [...] At a time when democratic freedoms are under pressure, today's Pride was a powerful reminder that united action can overcome authoritarianism and hate." Vula Tsetsi, Co-Chair of the European Green Party, stated: "Despite Viktor Orbán's far-right government's attempts to suppress the event, the Pride march stood as a proud testament to democratic resistance, in Hungary and across Europe. This year's Budapest Pride became a beacon of hope."

=== Anti-Pride demonstration ===
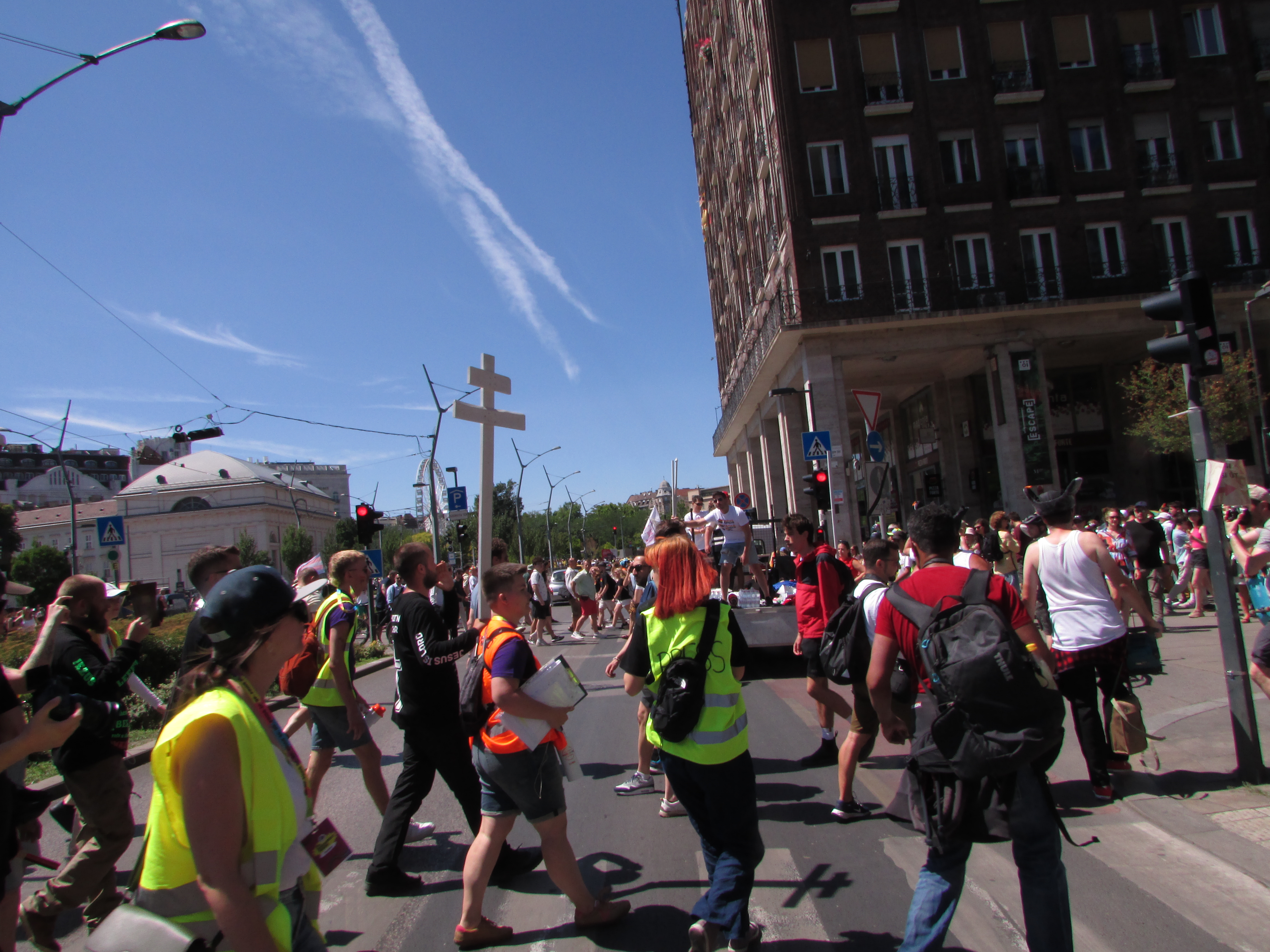
A counter-protestor with a cross

A handful of counter-protestors were present with a Bible and a patriarchal cross.

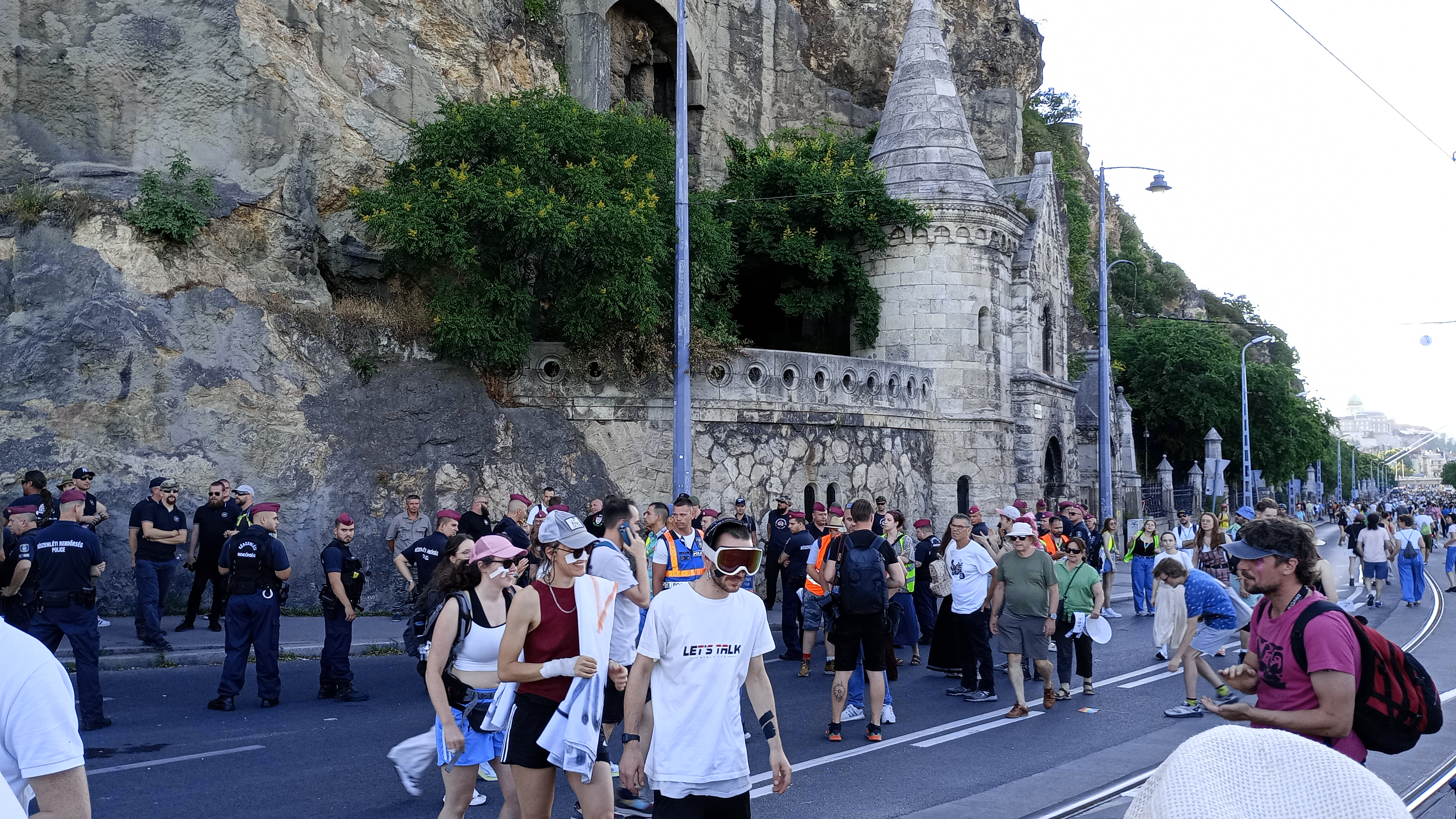
Police officers surrounding neo-Nazi counter-protestors during the 2025 Budapest Pride at Szent Gellért tér

Vice President of the MHM Előd Novák said that the government made a fool of themselves for making a law and then not executing it. During Budapest Pride, they blocked the Liberty Bridge, although there were only a few people present. They also held a banner stating "Stop LGBTQ pedophilia" on the road at the Buda end of the Szabadság bridge, but the police moved them to the sidewalk. The neo-Nazi Sixty-Four Counties Youth Movement (HVIM) received permission to hold an assembly at the Városháza park, where they welcomed "white, Christian, and heterosexual men and women", although only a few activists were present.

=== Aftermath ===
In the morning the day after the march, the public media's, M1's newscast did not mention Budapest Pride, even though many international media organizations reported about it, including Reuters, El País, Le Monde, la Repubblica, The New York Times, The Guardian, BBC, CNN and Süddeutsche Zeitung. The Swedish broadcasting corporation Sveriges Television covered the event live. Mandiner, a news website close to Fidesz, reported "Orbán's master plan worked: the opposition has become one with Pride. Which, according to the polls, the majority of Hungarians are against." Nézőpont Intézet, an opinion polling organization close to Fidesz, stated "Viktor Orbán has lured the opposition into a trap without them even noticing." Orbán said "Brussels issued instructions that there must be a Pride Parade in Budapest. Their puppet politicians then carried out the order. This is proof of what our lives would be like if the country were not led by a national government which protects our sovereignty." Future Prime Minister Péter Magyar, then de facto leader of the opposition, said that "the ruling party scored a huge own goal".

The National Bureau of Investigation opened an investigation against the organizers. In August 2025, Karácsony was interrogated as a suspect by the police. MP András Jámbor organized a protest in front of the police station at the time of Karácsony's interrogation, where around 200 people were present, and multiple people gave speeches including Karácsony. After the hour-long interrogation, Karácsony came back and gave another speech, in which he said that during the interrogation, he answered no questions, instead he argued that as a municipal event, the Pride parade could not have been banned. In his speech, he expressed sympathy towards the officers because – according to him – they seemed embarrassed but nonetheless polite. Magyar later said that the police should be this active regarding other matters, for example "the robbery of the Hungarian National Bank".

In December 2025, the police concluded their investigation with a recommendation to press charges against Karácsony. He asked people to focus instead on the Szőlő Street scandal. In January 2026, the Prosecutor's Office indicted Karácsony for violating the freedom of association and assembly, which Ștefănuță described as a scandal concerning the rule of law. The prosecution proposed Karácsony receiving a fine, which he stated he will fight in court. The 2026 Geuzenpenning was awarded to Karácsony "for his courageous commitment to democratic values, freedom of expression, and equal rights in an increasingly authoritarian political climate in Hungary". In March, Karácsony's case was suspended by the court while it awaited the decision of the Constitutional Court, whether the law on assembly and on the protection of children violate the constitution and the European Convention on Human Rights, and to resolve the ambiguous phrasing of the law. In June, the prosecutors dropped the charges against him, citing the landmark Commission v Hungary case from the European Court of Justice.

At the beginning of July 2025, IDEA Intézet conducted a public opinion poll in which 50% of respondents supported the 30th Budapest Pride parade, while 33% opposed it.

== 2025 Pécs Pride ==
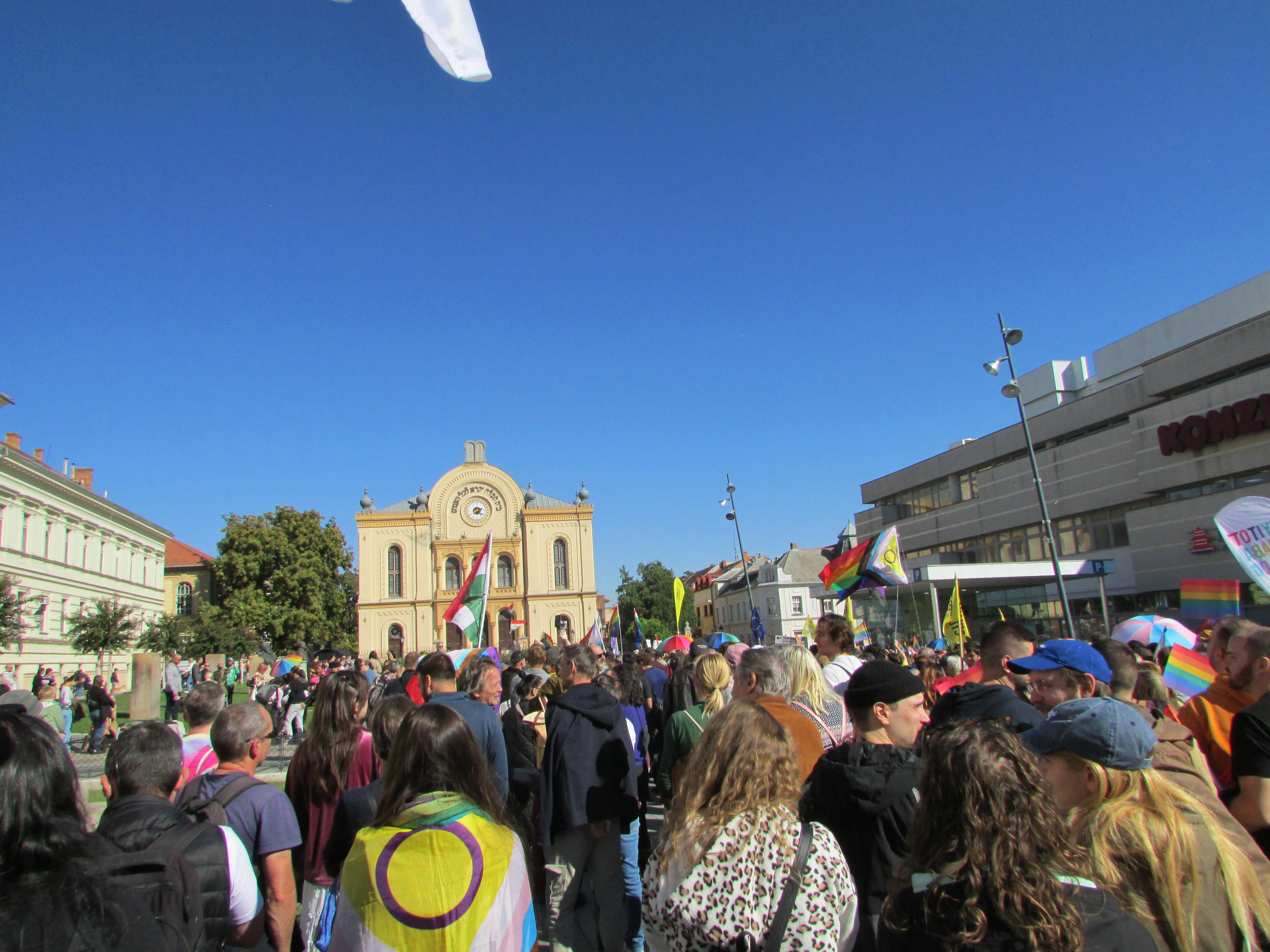
Crowd gathering at Kossuth Square

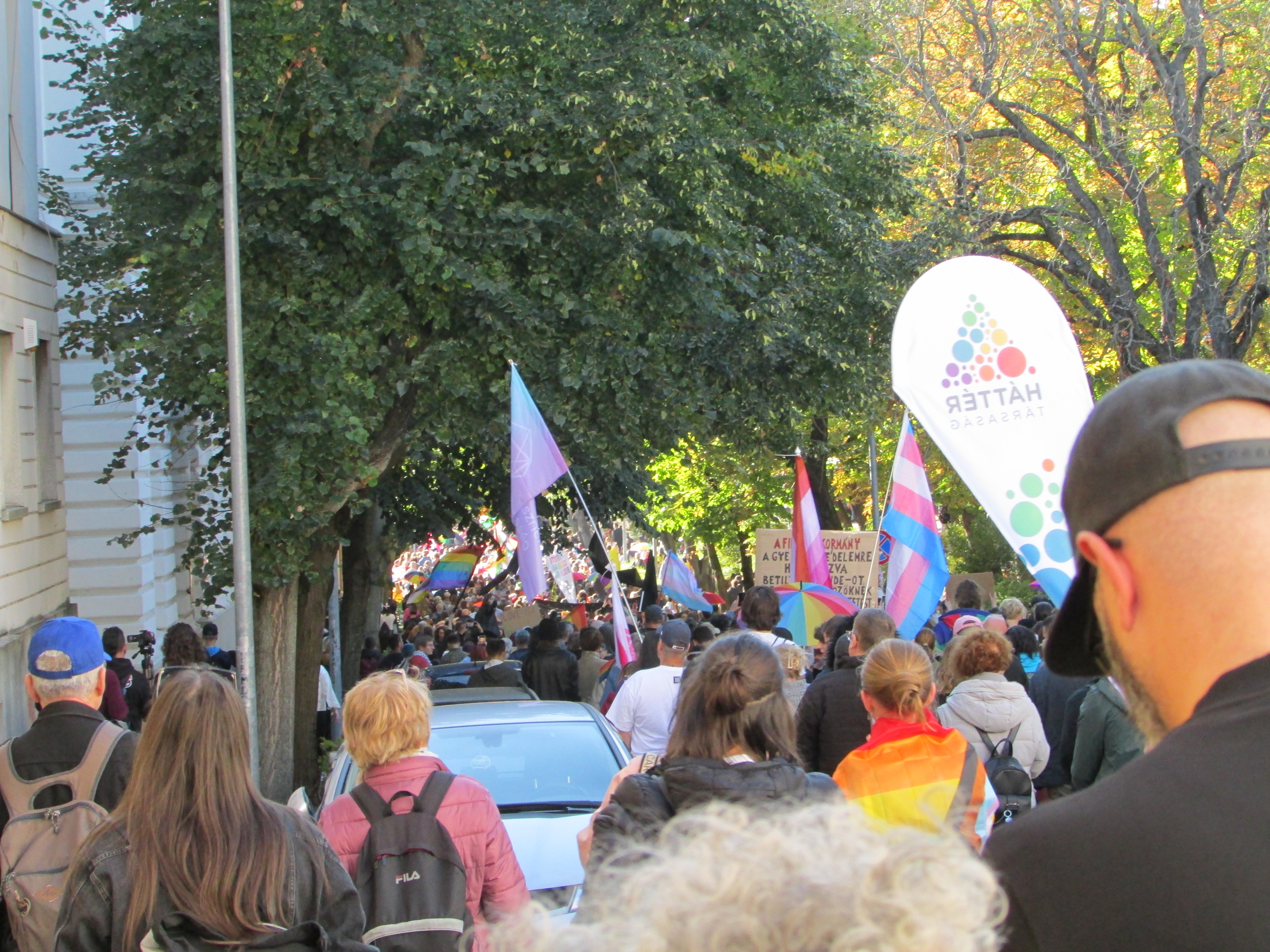
Crowd and flags, including Háttér Society's

As of 2025, Pécs is the only rural city that holds an annual Pride parade.

On 6 September 2025, the police prohibited the 2025 Pécs Pride, citing the amendments of the constitution and the law on assembly. The Curia upheld the prohibition on appeal. Our Homeland Movement representative Tamás Varga was granted permission from the police to hold five demonstrations on the day of Pécs Pride along the expected path of the parade. Amnesty International Hungary's petition, signed by 25 thousand people, asked the police to protect the parade, but no one from the police took the petition. On 2 October, while people from Amnesty International were recruiting people for the parade, police officers were taking pictures of them. At the same time as Pécs Pride, a demonstration regarding the damage to traffic caused by wildlife held by Péter Heindl (coinciding with World Animal Day) was initially prohibited by the police, but was later allowed by the Curia. Heindl argued that anyone fined for attending Pécs Pride could say that they were instead attending his demonstration. Facial recognition cameras were on police cars along the path of the parade.

Multiple counter-demonstrations were held before the parade, including by CitizenGO and Our Homeland Movement (MHM) supporters. The one at the railway station had about a hundred people attending, while the others had 10–15 people. A press conference was held by Terry Reintke and Nicu Ștefănuță; his speech was interrupted by Tamás Gaudi-Nagy.

The fifth Pécs Pride was held on 4 October by Diverse Youth Network starting from Kossuth Square. The path of the march was kept secret. Around six Sixty-Four Counties Youth Movement (HVIM) supporters were blocking the parade with a banner stating "Stop LGBTQ" in the beginning; they were pushed away by police officers after their refusal to move. A counter-protestor was hitting attendees with a bottle, broke a Pride flag, and knocked the banner out of the march leaders' hands; he was arrested by the police while trying to flee. Other counter-protestors were either asked to leave or were isolated by the police. Multiple opposition politicians were present, including the city's mayor, Attila Péterffy. Speeches were made at Tettye by Péterffy, main organizer Géza Buzás-Hábel, László Upor, three European politicians, and others. There were between seven and eight thousand people attending the parade. Some attendees were fined for not removing their masks covering their faces. (Note: The law on assembly considers covering the face to be a violation of the restrictions ensuring the peaceful nature of assemblies.) Twenty-eight people were identified by the police; procedures were started against four.

In October, Buzás-Hábel was interrogated by the police as a suspect. A demonstration in support of him was held in front of the police station with around seventy people attending. In February 2026, Buzás-Hábel was indicted by the prosecution for violating the freedom of association and assembly. In March, Buzás-Hábel's case was suspended and the court turned to the Constitutional Court, similarly to Karácsony's case. In June, the prosecutors dropped the charges against him, citing the landmark Commission v Hungary case from the European Court of Justice.

== Reversal ==
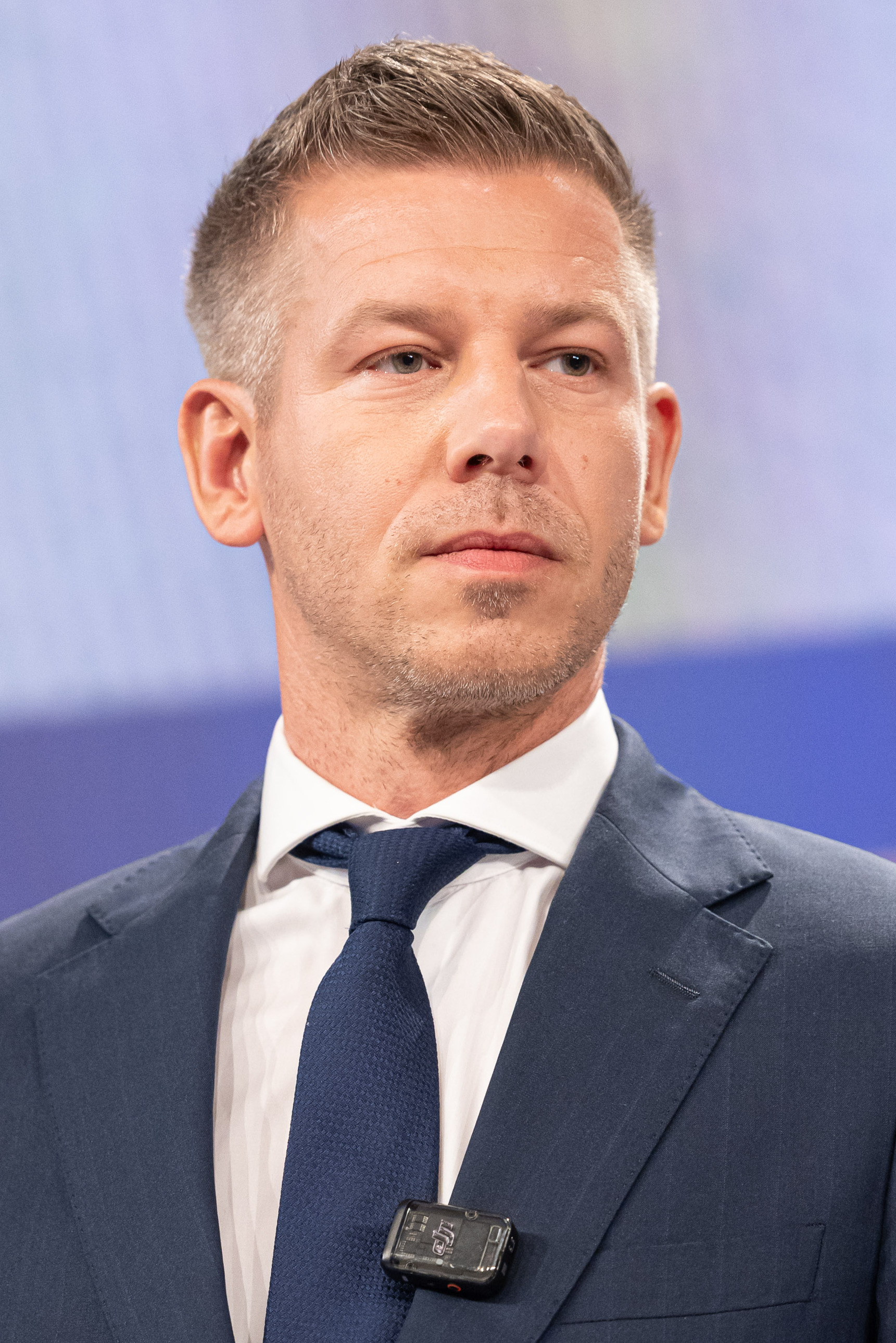
Prime Minister Péter Magyar and his party avoided taking a clear stance on LGBTQ rights, drawing criticism from some. He said that "everyone can live with, and love, whomever they want, as long as they do not violate the laws and do not harm others".

In April 2026, the European Court of Justice found in the landmark Commission v Hungary case that Hungary seriously violated the fundamental rights of LGBTQ people, "contrary to the very identity of the union". On 2 May 2026, Hungary's outgoing prime minister, Viktor Orbán, said that his government would not implement the ruling.

Following the 2026 change of government, the police approved the 2026 Budapest Pride parade, stating that "no grounds for prohibiting the assembly arose". Furthermore, they issued prescriptive-restrictive orders to three counter-demonstrations, distancing them from the Pride march. These decisions reinforced Prime Minister Péter Magyar's pledge of a more liberal approach to LGBTQ rights.

== See also ==
- Hungarian anti-LGBTQ law – 2021 law prohibiting exposing minors to LGBTQ material
- Russian anti-LGBTQ law – 2013 law censoring LGBTQ information
- LGBTQ rights in Hungary
- LGBTQ rights by country or territory
- Censorship of LGBTQ issues
- Discrimination against LGBTQ people
- Freedom of assembly
- Freedom of association
- "Think of the children" – rhetorical tactic
