= Sacha Prechal =

Dutch law professor and judge

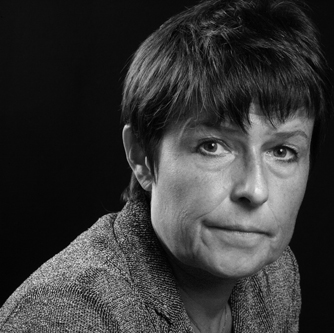
- Prechal (2008)

Judge of the European Court of Justice
- In office 10 June 2010 – 7 October 2024
- Preceded by: Christiaan Timmermans
- Succeeded by: Ben Smulders

Personal details
- Born: Alexandra Prechal; 15 March 1959 (age 67) Prague, Czechoslovakia
- Spouse: Alex Brenninkmeijer (died 2022)

Academic background
- Education: University of Groningen (LLM); University of Amsterdam (PhD)
- Thesis: Directives in European community law: A study on EC directives and their enforcement by National Courts (1995)
- Doctoral advisor: Richard Lauwaars

Academic work
- Discipline: European Union law
- Institutions: Tilburg University; Utrecht University

Alexandra 'Sacha' Prechal (born 15 March 1959) is a Dutch law professor and judge. From 2010 to 2024 she was a judge at the European Court of Justice. She previously worked as professor of European Law at Tilburg University and Utrecht University.

== Early life and career ==
Prechal was born on 15 March 1959 in Prague, Czechoslovakia. Her father worked as cellist for the Frysk Orkest in Leeuwarden, the Netherlands, since 1967. At the time of the Prague Spring in 1968 Prechal and her mother were visiting her father on holidays and they remained in the Netherlands. Growning up Prechal was interested in pursuing a career with languages and was interested in becoming an interpreter. She was advised to go obtain a degree in law as interpreters mostly worked for the European Community.

Prechal studied law at the University of Groningen between 1977 and 1983 and received her title of Doctor of Laws at the University of Amsterdam in 1995. After receiving her initial law degree she started working as an academic lecturer of Law at Maastricht University until 1987. She then worked as a legal secretary/cabinet officer for the Dutch judges at the Court of Justice of the European Communities between 1987 and 1991. Prechal subsequently returned to the Netherlands to work as an academic lecturer at the Europe Institute of the Law faculty of the University of Amsterdam. In 1995 she obtained her promotion under Richard Lauwaars at the same university with a thesis titled: Directives in European Community Law. A Study on Directives and their Enforcement by National Courts. In the same year she moved to work as professor of European Law at Tilburg University. She held a position there from 1995 until 2003, when she moved to Utrecht University where she occupies the same position and is still currently employed.

== European Court of Justice ==
In 2010 Prechal was appointed as a judge of the European Court of Justice. She had applied for the position after seeing an advertisement in the NRC Handelsblad and her husband advised to pursue the option. She succeeded Christiaan Timmermans as the Dutch judge and finished his term. In February 2018 her term in office was extended for another six years. In 2022 Prechal stated she was not interested in pursuing a third term and preferred to dedicate time to academic activity, leisure, and writing a third edition of her original thesis. As a judge she argued against the formation of specialized chambers within the Court. She handled a case on the discrimination of women regarding social security in Spain. She retired as a judge in 2024 and was succeeded by Ben Smulders.

Prechal stated that her predecessors Thijmen Koopmans and Jos Kapteyn, whom she worked under between 1987 and 1991, were large influences, teaching her professional skills.

== Honours and awards ==
In 2008 Prechal was made member of the Royal Netherlands Academy of Arts and Sciences. Prechal was named as the most powerful Dutch woman in the field of Justice and Public Order in 2012 by Opzij magazine. She obtained an honorary doctorate from Tilburg University in 2013.

In 2024 the European University Institute awarded Prechal their EUI Honoris Causa Degree in recognotion of her contribution to European law.

== Personal life ==
Prechal met her future husband Alex Brenninkmeijer at a conference. The couple owned a house in the French Alps. Brenninkmeijer died in 2022.

== Other activities ==
- Review of European Administrative Law, Founder and Member of the Editorial Board
- European Constitutional Law Review, Member of the Board of Advisors
- Dutch Society for European Law, Member of the Board
