= Commission v Hungary (C-769/22) =

European Court of Justice case concerning LGBTI rights

- European Court of Justice

Decided 21 April 2026
- Full case name: European Commission v Hungary
- Case: C-769/22
- ECLI: ECLI:EU:C:2026:326
- Case type: Infringement proceedings, Treaty on the Functioning of the European Union (Article 258)
- Chamber: Full Court
- Procedural history: Infringement proceeding by the European Commission against the Government of Hungary for the failure of Hungary to adhere to the founding values of the European Union

Court composition
- President; Koen Lenaerts
- Judge Rapporteur; María Lourdes Arastey Sahún
- Advocate General; Tamara Ćapeta

Instruments cited
- Treaty on European Union (Article 2); Treaty on the Functioning of the European Union (Article 56); Charter of Fundamental Rights of the European Union (Articles 1, 7, 11, 21); Directive 2000/31/EC (Articles 3 and 4); Directive 2006/123/EC (Article 16); Directive 2010/13/EU (Articles 6a and 9)

Legislation affecting
- Treaty on European Union (Article 2); Treaty on the Functioning of the European Union (Article 56); Directive 2000/31/EC; Directive 2006/123/EC; Directive 2010/13/EU; Charter of Fundamental Rights of the European Union (Articles 1, 7, 11, 21)

Commission v Hungary (C-769/22) is a judgement of the European Court of Justice (ECJ) delivered in April 2026 concerning an anti-LGBTI law enacted by Hungary. The Court ruled that the law violates the founding values of the European Union as enshrined in Article 2 of the Treaty on European Union (TEU), as well as Article 1 of the Charter of Fundamental Rights of the European Union (CFR), regarding the inviolability of human dignity. It is the first time that either article has been applied in a ruling by the Court of Justice of the European Union. It pitted the European Commission, the European Parliament, and a majority of the member states of the European Union against Hungary.

In June 2021, the National Assembly of Hungary enacted the anti-LGBTI law which prohibited minors from accessing any content pertaining to LGBTI people and LGBTI rights. In July 2021, the European Commission gave formal notice to the Government of Hungary of its intent to launch infringement proceedings against Hungary for the failure to adhere to core EU values. In July 2022, the case was taken to court. By April 2023, the majority of the member states of the European Union and the European Parliament joined the European Commission as applicants. In November 2024, the case was heard before the Full Court of the ECJ, consisting of all 27 judges. In June 2025, an Advocate General Tamara Ćapeta issued a preliminary opinion in support of the applicants and against the defendant on all counts. In April 2026, the President of the Court, Koen Lenaerts, delivered the judgement.

The Full Court found that Hungary had systematically and seriously violated the fundamental rights of LGBTI people by seeking to exclude and isolate them from society. The Court ruled that the law violates "the very identity of the Union" as set forth in Article 2 TEU, and constitutes a violation of Article 1 CFR. The court further found that Hungary had discriminated against LGBTI people on the basis of both sex and sexual orientation, thereby violating fundamental freedoms. The judgment noted that the law was an attempt to portray LGBTI people as a threat to society, and in doing so Hungary had violated the core values that constitute the European Union's identity.

== Background ==
=== Law ===
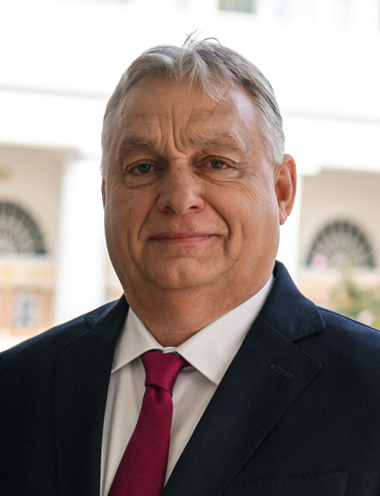
The law was enacted by the Christian nationalist government of Viktor Orbán.

In June 2021, the National Assembly of Hungary enacted the anti-LGBTI law in Hungary, which prohibits the broadcast, display, distribution, presentation, publication, and transaction of any and all content that chronicles LGBTI history, covers LGBTI literature, depicts LGBTI characters, presents LGBTI media, portrays LGBTI people, or mentions LGBTI rights to minors in commerce, communication, education, information, literature, and media.

The original text of the law as first introduced in the National Assembly concerned only an increase in penalties against pedophiles who create, distribute, or possess child pornography, or commit child sexual abuse. The original law enjoyed broad support across the political spectrum in Hungary. However, a government politician filed a last minute amendment that targeted the Hungarian LGBTI community. Opposition politicians boycotted the final vote in protest of the surprise amendment. Government politicians from Fidesz – Hungarian Civic Alliance (Fidesz), a Christian nationalist and far-right party, and the Christian Democratic People's Party (KDNP), a Christian and far-right party, as well as Jobbik – Movement for a Better Hungary (Jobbik), a formerly neo-Nazi and far-right party, passed the amended law over the opposition boycott.

International observers and domestic critics characterized the law as a political maneuver by the Christian nationalist government of Viktor Orbán, which presents itself as an adherent of "traditional Christian values", in response to multiple scandals concerning child pornography and child sexual abuse by pedophiles who are diplomats and politicians from the Fidesz–KDNP Party Alliance (Fidesz–KDNP), a Christian nationalist and far-right electoral alliance, as well as Catholic Church sexual abuse cases committed by pedophile priests in the Catholic Church in Hungary, which is strongly supported by the Christian nationalist government, which adheres to the beliefs and doctrines of the Catholic Church, as a means to falsely conflate pedophiles with LGBTI people, whom the Christian nationalist government portrays as a threat to Christianity in Hungary.

=== Reactions ===
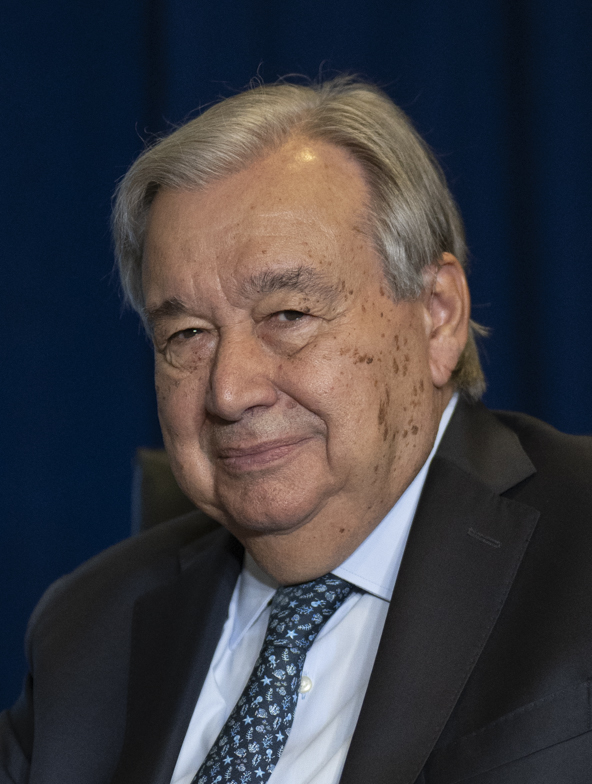
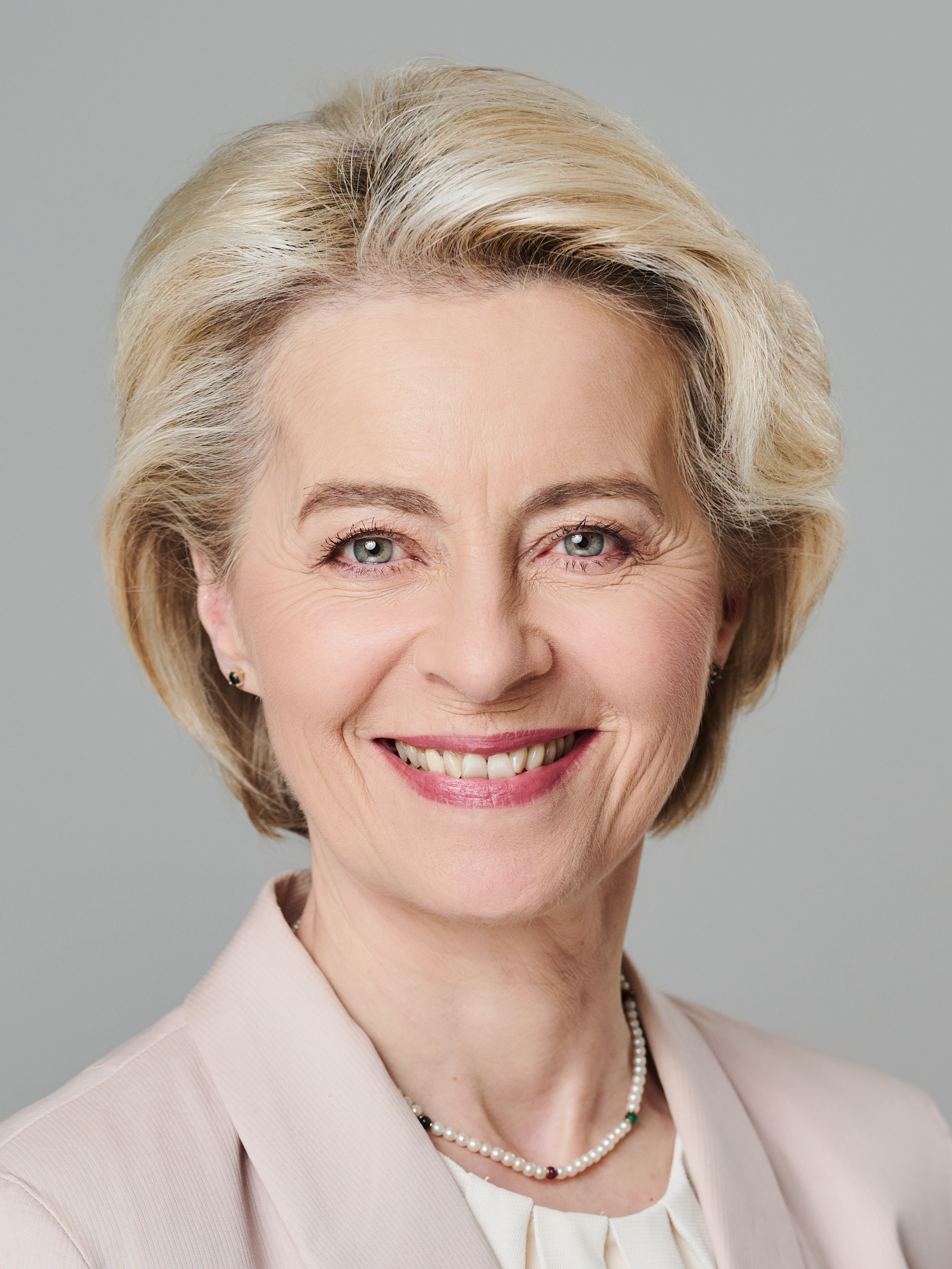
The law was condemned by Antonio Guterres (left) and Ursula von der Leyen (right), the leaders of the United Nations and the European Union, respectively, as discrimination against LGBTI people.

The law was condemned by the European Commission and the European Parliament as an attack on freedom, democracy, equality before the law, fundamental rights, and the rule of law, as well as a violation of the laws of the European Union. The Council of Europe and the European Commission for Democracy through Law further identified the law as a violation of the European Convention on Human Rights and international human rights law. Additionally, the United Nations and the United Nations Independent Expert on sexual orientation and gender identity labeled the measure as discriminatory and a breach of international human rights standards.

A majority of liberal democracies — including Argentina, Australia, Canada, France, Germany, the United Kingdom, the United States, and Uruguay — likewise condemned the law as discrimination based on sexual orientation and gender identity. This position was supported by a total of 30 nations, as well as numerous cultural institutions. Furthermore, human rights organisations such as All Out, Amnesty International, Article 19, Civicus, Háttér Society, Human Rights Watch, ILGA-Europe, and Transgender Europe, denounced the law as attack on human dignity and the freedomes of assembly, expression, information, and speech.

== Case ==
=== Notice ===
In July 2021, the European Commission gave formal notice to the Government of Hungary regarding its intent to launch infringement proceedings against Hungary over its anti-LGBTQ law. The Commission alleged a failure to adhere to the European Union's founding values, including freedom, human dignity, minority rights, and equality before the law, as well as specific violations of Article 2 of the Treaty on European Union (Article 2 TEU), Article 56 of the Treaty on the Functioning of the European Union, and Articles 1, 7, 11, and 21 of the Charter of Fundamental Rights (CFR).

It is the largest human rights case in the history of the European Union. It also marks the first time the European Commission has launched an infringement proceeding against a member state on the basis of Article 2 TEU and Article 1 of the CFR as freestanding legal provisions.

After the Hungarian government failed to provide a satisfactory response, the Commission formally referred the matter to the European Court of Justice in July 2022. By April 2023, the European Parliament and a majority of the member states — Austria, Belgium, Denmark, Estonia, Finland, France, Greece, Germany, Ireland, Luxembourg, Malta, the Netherlands, Portugal, Slovenia, Spain, and Sweden — had joined the case in support of the Commission. No member state sided with Hungary.

=== Hearing ===
The Palais de la Cour de Justice, where the case was heard.

On 19 November 2024, the case was heard before the Full Court of the European Court of Justice at the Palais de la Cour de Justice in Luxembourg. All 27 judges convened for the hearing, a rare occurrence which indicates that the Court considers the case to be of "exceptional importance".

The European Commission stated that, contrary to the position of the Hungarian government, the law itself harms minors, specifically LGBTI youth, by further marginalizing them within society. The Commission argued that the legislation undermines social cohesion by systematically targeting a minority and portraying them as a threat. It further noted that the law represents a sufficiently serious violation of minority rights to breach both Article 2 TEU and Article 1 CFR as freestanding provisions. In its defense, Hungary maintained that the dispute arose from a misinterpretation of the legislation's intent, arguing that the law is neither discriminatory nor homophobic and does not infringe upon the equality or rights of LGBTI people.

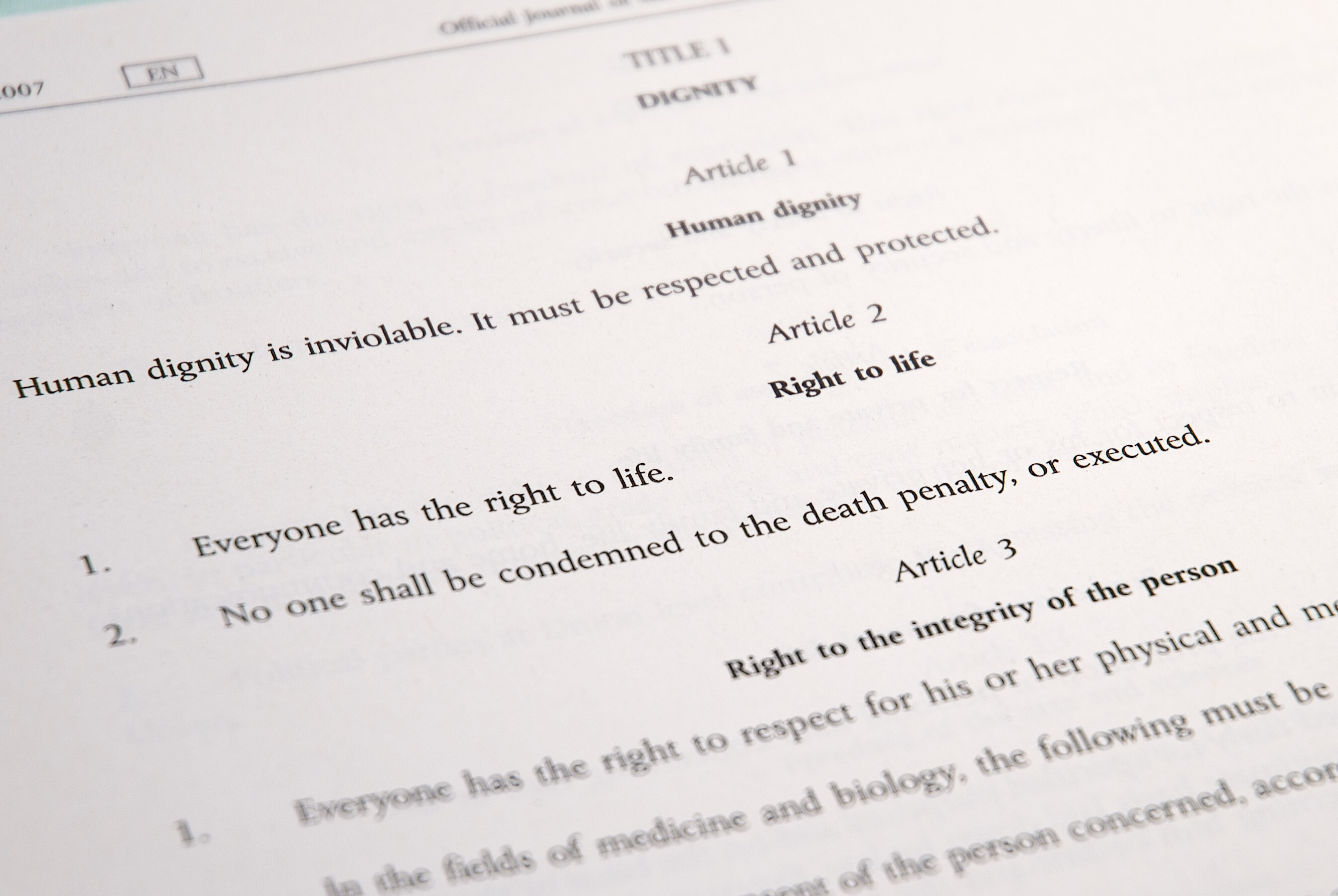
Article 1 of the Charter of Fundamental Rights of the European Union, which concerns the inviolability of human dignity, is central to the case.

The German legal blog Verfassungsblog noted that although the majority of the member states of the European Union and the European Parliament backed the European Commission, their positions contained subtle differences regarding the invocation, assessment, and limitation of Article 2 TEU. The blog divided these positions into two main camps. Belgium, Estonia, Germany, Luxembourg, Malta, and Sweden supported the Commission's view of Article 2 as an autonomous, independent provision, albeit with caveats; for example, Germany and Luxembourg argued that Article 2 should only be invoked after other provisions of EU law have been found to be violated. In contrast, Denmark, Ireland, Greece, the Netherlands, Finland, Spain, and the European Parliament argued that Article 2 should only be invoked "in connection with other provisions".

== Legal analysis ==
On 21 November 2024, John Morijn, an assistant professor of European human rights law at the University of Groningen, stated in an interview with The Parliament Magazine that he considers the outcome of the case a foregone conclusion due to its strong legal foundation.

It's rock solid. This case is not really about who will win or lose because I'm sure the Commission will win and Hungary will lose. The only question really is how you win. So do you only win on internal market issues? Or do you also win on the heavier charges, for example, in the way that you stigmatise LGBTQ+ people by equating them with paedophiles, going directly against the very nature of fundamental rights and human dignity?

— John Morijn, interview regarding the case, The Parliament Magazine (21 November 2024)

Morijn highlighted the unprecedented nature of the proceedings, noting that "this is the first on multiple counts", specifically citing the Commission's reliance on Article 1 CFR and its direct invocation of Article 2 TEU, which he described as the "DNA" of the European Union. He predicted a comprehensive victory for the Commission, suggesting the court would find Hungary in violation of both internal market regulations of the charter and the broader values enshrined in the TEU.

The case was characterized as historic by The Parliament Magazine and as a landmark by Verfassungsblog prior to the issuance of the judgement.

== Preliminary opinion ==
On 5 June 2025, Tamara Ćapeta, an Advocate General of the European Court of Justice, issued a preliminary opinion in the case supporting the European Commission on all grounds. She recommended that Hungary be declared in violation of Article 2 TEU and Article 1 CFR as freestanding provisions. Ćapeta argued that Hungary had "negated several of those fundamental values" and "significantly deviated from the model of a constitutional democracy". She further asserted that the fundamental rights and human dignity of LGBTI people "cannot be subject to debate through dialogue."

Minors who belong to the LGBTI community are especially affected, as the removal of information about LGBTI lives from the public sphere prevents them from realising that their life is not abnormal. It also affects their acceptance by their peers, in school or other environments and thus affects their right to a 'private social life' as well. Therefore, rather than protecting minors from harm, the contested legislation expands such harm.

— Tamara Ćapeta, Opinion of Advocate General Ćapeta, European Union (5 June 2025)

In what The Guardian described as a "resounding opinion", Ćapeta found that the anti-LGBTI law was based on "a prejudice" that the lives of LGBTI people are "not of equal value or status" rather than on scientific evidence. She stated that the Hungarian government attempted to impose a "climate of hostility", noting that the "stigmatising effects ... may affect the feelings of identity, self-esteem and self-confidence of LGBTI persons." Finally, Ćapeta rejected Hungary's "child protection" defense, observing that the legislation targets the "portrayal of ordinary lives of LGBTI people, and is not limited to shielding minors from pornographic content, which was prohibited by the law in Hungary already."

== Judgement ==
In April 2026, in a landmark and wide-ranging judgement delivered by the President of the European Court of Justice, Koen Lenaerts, the court found that Hungary had so seriously systematically violated the fundamental rights of LGBTI people by attempting to exclude, isolate, and sideline them from society that the law violates "the very identity of the Union" as inscribed in Article 2 TEU and also violates Article 1 CFR. It is the first time in the history of the European Union that either article has been implemented in a ruling by the Court of Justice of the European Union.

On the contrary, the difference in treatment based on sex and sexual orientation brought about by that provision is such as to foster the shaming and alienation of persons, in particular young people and adolescents whose gender identity or sexual orientation does not correspond to 'traditional social norms', with those restrictions causing more harm than they prevent, in particular with regard to minors.

— Judgment of the Full Court, European Court of Justice (21 April 2026)

The court further found that Hungary had discriminated against LGBTI people on the basis of both sex and sexual orientation, violating fundamental freedoms of the European Union. The judgment observed that the law falsely conflated LGBTI people with pedophiles, an association which "stigmatises and marginalises" LGBTI people and encourages hostility. Ultimately, the Court noted that the legislation was an attempt to portray LGBTI people as a threat to society.

== Reactions ==
On 2 May 2026, Hungary's outgoing prime minister Viktor Orbán said that his government would not implement the ruling. Human Rights Watch called upon the new Tisza Party government to implement and comply with the ruling.

Following the ruling, Budapest Pride received police permits for its 2026 event, with authorities citing that there was no legal basis to deny permission for the event due to the ECJ ruling: the 2025 event became an unsanctioned assembly in response to a related bill that banned public assemblies that violated the child protection law. Criminal charges against mayor Gergely Karácsony for holding an illegal assembly were also dropped, with prosecutors similarly citing the EU ruling.

== See also ==
- LGBTI rights in Hungary
- LGBTI rights in the European Union
