= LGBTQ rights in Hungary =

- Location of Hungary (dark green) – in Europe (light green & dark grey) – in the European Union (light green) – [Legend]
- Legal status: Legal since 1961, age of consent equalized in 2002; freedom of expression restricted
- Gender identity: Legal gender change is de facto impossible since 2018, explicitly illegal since 2020.
- Military: LGB people allowed to openly serve, transgender people not allowed.
- Discrimination protections: Sexual orientation and gender identity protections (see below)

Family rights
- Recognition of relationships: Unregistered cohabitation since 1996, Registered partnerships since 2009
- Restrictions: Same-sex marriage constitutionally banned
- Adoption: Same-sex couples adopting children has been constitutionally banned since 2020.

Lesbian, gay, bisexual, transgender, and queer (LGBTQ) people in Hungary face significant challenges not experienced by non-LGBTQ residents, although the view of LGBTQ people and LGBTQ rights in Hungarian society has slightly improved in recent years. Homosexuality is legal in Hungary for both men and women. Discrimination on the basis of sexual orientation and sex is banned in the country. Households headed by same-sex couples are not eligible for all of the same legal rights available to heterosexual married couples. Registered partnership for same-sex couples was legalised in 2009, but same-sex marriage remains banned.

Under the far-right government of Viktor Orbán, the Hungarian government began to enact a number of anti-LGBTQ policies in the 2020s, including a 2020 bill which ended legal recognition of gender identity, a resolution against the Istanbul Convention due to its alleged promotion of "gender ideology", a ban on adoption by same-sex couples, a 2021 "child protection" law prohibiting the distribution of content promoting homosexuality or gender transitions to minors, a 2025 law banning public assemblies that violate the child protection law (such as parades), and an amendment to Fundamental Law codifying gender as a male-female binary. After being denied police permits due to the pride parade ban, Budapest Pride went on as a demonstration against the Orbán government, and Mayor Gergely Karácsony was charged with holding an illegal public assembly.

In April 2026, Orbán was defeated in the parliamentary election by Péter Magyar and the Tisza Party, while the European Court of Justice (ECJ) ruled shortly afterward that the Orbán-era "child protection" law violated the EU Charter of Fundamental Rights and Treaty of the European Union, as it infringed upon freedom of expression and fundamental rights. In the wake of the ruling and new government, the Budapest police reversed its ban on Budapest Pride and dropped its charges against Mayor Karácsony, and Parliament approved an amendment to remove the anti-LGBTQ provisions from the child protection law. Magyar also indicated plans to repeal the ban on same-sex adoption.

== Law regarding same-sex sexual activity ==
The first Hungarian Penal Code by Károly Csemegi (1878) punished homosexuality between men ("természet elleni fajtalanság" – perversion against nature (nature's law)) with prison up to one year. Homosexual activity above the age of 20 was decriminalized in 1961, then above the age of 18 in 1978 by the new Penal Code. The age of consent, which is 14, has applied equally to heterosexual and homosexual activity since a Constitutional Court decision of 2002. Lesbian, gay and bisexual people are not banned from openly serving in the military service.

== Recognition of same-sex relationships ==
Unregistered cohabitation has been recognised since 1996. It applies to any couple living together in an economic and sexual relationship (common-law marriage), including same-sex couples. No official registration is required. The law gives some specified rights and benefits to two persons living together. Unregistered cohabitation is defined in the Civil Code as "when two persons are living together outside of wedlock in an emotional and financial community in the same household, provided that neither of them is engaged in wedlock or partnership with another person, registered or otherwise, and that they are not related in direct line, and they are not siblings." Inheritance is possible only with testament, and widow-pension is available for couples cohabiting for more than 10 years.

On 17 December 2007, the Parliament adopted a registered partnership bill submitted by the Hungarian Socialist Party–Alliance of Free Democrats Government. The bill was found unconstitutional by the Constitutional Court because it duplicated the institution of marriage for opposite-sex couples. In February 2009, the Parliament approval a modified version of the bill. Since 1 July 2009, same-sex couples can enter into registered partnerships. The law gives the same rights to registered partners as to spouses except for adoption, assisted reproduction or taking a surname.

On 1 January 2012, a new constitution, enacted by the Parliament in 2011, came into effect, restricting marriage to opposite-sex couples and containing no guarantees of protection from discrimination on account of sexual orientation. Viktor Orbán, leader of the ruling Fidesz party, which recently came to power with a two-thirds majority in the parliament, has been dubbed “Viktator” by the crowds protesting the new constitution. However, discrimination on the basis of sexual orientation remains banned through interpretation of the general non-discrimination provision in the Constitution, as well as by the Equal Treatment Act.

== Adoption and family planning ==
Although same-sex couples cannot adopt jointly, adoption by individuals is illegal regardless of sexual orientation or partnership status. Stepchild adoption is only available for married (different-sex) couples.

Access to IVF and donor insemination is available for single women regardless of sexual orientation, but not available for lesbians cohabiting or in a registered partnership with their same-sex partners.

In November 2017, the Hungarian Ombudsman found that the rejection of a lesbian couple's adoption application was "an infringement on the child's right to protection and care, and amounted to unlawful discrimination based on sexual orientation." As joint adoption for same-sex couples is not legal in Hungary, the couple decided that one of the partners would legally adopt the child. The couple was, however, very open about their relationship and were found suitable to adopt. During the following months, the couple took care of a 16-month-old girl, but child protection services later stopped the application procedure due to the couple's sexual orientation. This decision disrupted the life of the child, as she would not eat properly anymore and had to be taken to a child psychologist. The couple appealed to the Commissioner for Fundamental Rights (the Ombudsman responsible for the rights of children, nationalities in Hungary, vulnerable social groups and the interests of future generations), who found the child protection service's rejection of the couple unlawful and discriminatory. The Commissioner said that "a person wishing to adopt has no right to adopt a particular child, but s/he does have the right to equal treatment and equality before the law in the procedure." The Commissioner based their decision on the 2008 E.B. v. France case, in which the European Court of Human Rights ruled that one's sexual orientation should not be a factor in adoption cases.

In October 2020, while discussing a children's book published by an LGBTQ organisation on Magyar Rádió, Prime Minister Orbán stated that, despite Hungary being "tolerant and patient" towards LGBTQ people, "there is a red line that cannot be crossed" and that "gays are to leave our children alone".

In November 2020, the Fidesz government proposed a constitutional amendment which would ban adoption by same-sex couples. Language in the amendment would ensure "education in accordance with the values based on Hungary's constitutional identity and Christian culture." The same amendment would also severely restrict the ability of single-parent families to adopt. On 16 December 2020 the amendment was passed by the National Assembly with 123 ayes, 45 nays and 5 abstentions.

In April 2023, Hungary's unicameral parliament passed a bill enabling and encouraging citizens to report same-sex couples which raise children to the state authorities - such as police and child protection. The President of Hungary Katalin Novák vetoed the bill - that formally prevented it from becoming enacted into law.

== Discrimination protections ==
In 2000, the Constitutional Court recognized that the constitutional ban on discrimination based on "other status" covers sexual orientation as well. The Act on Public Health has banned sexual orientation-related discrimination in health services since 1997 and gender identity-related discrimination since 2004. The 2003 Act on Equal Treatment and the Promotion of Equal Opportunities (Hungarian: 2003. évi CXXV. törvény az egyenlő bánásmódról és az esélyegyenlőség előmozdításáról), which took effect in January 2004, forbids discrimination based on factors that include sexual orientation and gender identity in the fields of employment, education, housing, health, and access to goods and services. Article 8 of the Act states as follows:

Provisions that result in a person or a group [being] treated less favourably than another person or group in a comparable situation because of his/her sex, racial origin, colour, nationality, national or ethnic origin, mother tongue, disability, state of health, religious or ideological conviction, political or other opinion, family status, motherhood (pregnancy) or fatherhood, sexual orientation, gender identity, age, social origin, financial status, the part-time nature or definite term of the employment relationship or other relationship related to employment, the membership of an organisation representing employees' interests, [and any] other status, attribute or characteristic are considered direct discrimination.

== Gender identity and expression ==
In December 2017, a government decree was published, establishing for the first time a legal basis for gender transitions. After 1 January 2018, transgender people living in Hungary were theoretically able to change their legal gender. They required a diagnosis from a medical professional, but did not have to undergo hormone therapy, sterilization or gender-affirming surgery. However, Transvanilla – an organization based in Budapest, which campaigns on behalf of transgender rights – reports that the government has refused to honor applications of the legal gender change since 2018. In 2019, a joint case of 23 people was created and submitted to the European Court of Human Rights.

In 2018, the Hungarian government removed accreditation from gender studies programs at Hungarian universities, arguing that there was no market for gender studies graduates. Bence Rétvári, the political undersecretary in the ministry of Human Resources justified the decision by claiming that, "Gender Studies - similarly to Marxism-Leninism - can be called an ideology rather than a science."

While Hungary, alongside the majority of EU countries, has signed the Istanbul Convention treaty that aims to combat and prevent violence against women, it has refused to take further action to ratify the Convention. In May 2020, the National Assembly adopted a resolution that rejected the Istanbul Convention, and supports the government declaration that claims that the measures of the treaty promote “destructive gender ideologies” and “illegal migration.” The declaration was adopted with 115 votes in favor, 35 against and three abstentions. The Hungarian government, including the Ministry of Justice, argued that the Hungarian law already contains a “comprehensive system for assisting and protecting victims.”

On 19 May 2020, the National Assembly voted 134–56 (with 4 abstaining) in favour of a bill that ended legal recognition of transgender and intersex persons; the bill enshrines a definition of sex (nem, which was previously interpreted as referring to both sex and gender) in federal law as an immutable male-female binary determined at birth which cannot be changed (születési nem). Dunja Mijatović, commissioner for human rights in the Council of Europe, stated it "contravenes human rights standards and the case law of the European Court of Human Rights". President János Áder signed the bill into law on 28 May 2020.

In January 2021 the government ordered that a book published by the Labrisz Lesbian Association carry warnings saying it "[contains] behaviour inconsistent with traditional gender roles". According to a government spokesperson, "the book is sold as a fairytale... but it hides the fact that it depicts behaviour inconsistent with traditional gender roles." In response, the association announced that they would be filing suit. After the publication of thebook, Fidesz also launched a smear campaign against the organization and the entire LGBTQ community, deliberately confusing homosexuality with pedophilia. Labrisz took the government-related media giant Mediaworks to court too, for an article that called them pedophiles without any proof. In the lawsuits, the human rights NGO Hungarian Helsinki Committee represented Labrisz, and they won at first instance. However, in November 2022, the Curia (the Curia found that the article did not violate Labrisz's right to good reputation. The human rights defenders don't accept this decision - claiming double standards and that the government uses the freedom expression as an excuse to cover hatred and abuse - and turn to the Constitutional Court.

In April 2023, Hungary implemented a law enabling citizens to report to the state people who "contest" a child's right to "an identity appropriate to their sex at birth".

In April 2025, a constitutional amendment was passed to enshrine in Fundamental Law that there are only two genders, male and female, and that rights to a child's "proper physical, mental and moral development" takes precedence over all other fundamental rights aside from the right to life.

== Blood donation ==
Gay and bisexual men were allowed to donate blood following a 12-month deferral period. In 2020, this deferral period was scrapped, with individualised risk assessment introduced.

== Freedom of speech and expression ==
In 2012, Jobbik MP Ádám Mirkóczki introduced a constitutional amendment to the Parliament seeking to ban "the promotion of sexual deviations". The amendment would punish the "promotion of homosexuality or other disorders of sexual behaviour" with up to eight years in prison. LMBT Federation, a Hungarian LGBT advocacy group, protested against the amendment and called on Parliament to reject it. The Democratic Coalition also voiced their opposition and called it "mean and shameful". The amendment ultimately failed to pass.

In November 2016, the small Hungarian town of Ásotthalom passed a law banning "gay propaganda", Muslim call to prayer and Muslim clothing. Mayor László Toroczkai (Our Homeland) called on Christians locals to support a "holy war on Muslims and multiculturalism". In April 2017, after a lawsuit challenging the ban was filed, the Constitutional Court struck down the ban, ruling that it violated human rights law as it aimed to "limit directly the freedom of speech, conscience and religion".

In June 2018, the Hungarian State Opera House cancelled 15 Billy Elliot performances, after pro-government newspaper Magyar Idők claimed that the show could turn children gay. However other 29 Billy Elliot performances would be held as planned.

In November 2020, the town of Nagykáta adopted a resolution banning the dissemination and promotion of so-called "LGBT propaganda".

=== 2021 child protection law ===
In June 2021, an anti-pedophilia bill was introduced in the National Assembly, which was originally intended to increase fines for child sexual abuse and the creation, possession, or distribution of child sexual abuse material (CSAM). Shortly before the bill was adopted, an amendment was passed to also criminalize the dissemination of content promoting "divergence from self-identity corresponding to sex at birth, sex change, or homosexuality" to persons under the age of 18. On 15 June, the bill was passed by Parliament by a vote of 157–1. President János Áder signed the bill into law on 23 June 2021, and it came into effect on 1 July. A Hungarian government spokesperson claimed the ban is intended to prevent children from accessing content that "[they] can misunderstand and which may have a detrimental effect on their development".

Per the law, a decree was issued to require stores offering children's books containing homosexuality or gender transition content to seal them in a "closed wrapping" and place them away from other books, and prohibiting their sale at any location within 200 metres of a church or school. The National Media and Infocommunications Authority similarly issued guidance stating that films and television programmes where homosexuality or gender transitions are a "defining feature" would not be considered suitable for viewers under the age of 18.

The law faced criticism from human rights groups, which argued that the bill infringed upon freedom of expression, would prevent minors from being able to access resources and support, and would harm their mental health. David Vig of Amnesty International compared the bill to Russia's similar LGBT "propaganda" law, arguing that it "[would] further stigmatize LGBTI people, exposing them to greater discrimination in what is already a hostile environment." Seventeen EU member states denounced the bill as a breach of the Charter of Fundamental Rights of the European Union (CFR).

In July 2021, it was reported that the European Commission would file two lawsuits challenging the law, with one suit alleging that it violated freedom of expression, and was inconsistent with the EU's Audiovisual Media Services Directive and Electronic Commerce Directive. The second challenged the government's efforts to censure a children's book published by Labrisz, in violation of the Unfair Commercial Practices Directive. The Commission initiated infringement proceedings against Hungary on 15 July, and subsequently issued a reasoned opinion on 2 December 2021, highlighting the country’s failure to meet its obligations under various EU directives and articles concerning audiovisual media services, electronic commerce, internal market services, data protection, and fundamental rights.With Hungary's response deemed unsatisfactory, on July 15, 2022, the Commission referred Hungary to the European Court of Justice. As of April 2023, 15 member states had joined the suit as third-parties, making it the largest civil rights case in EU history.

The government would hold a referendum on LGBTQ topics in children's education on 3 April 2022 alongside the 2022 elections. The referendum was countered by Amnesty International Hungary, Háttér Society, and 12 other civil rights organizations mobilizing over 1.7 million people; the referendum did not reach the threshold of 50% valid votes in order to pass.

The rapid spread of similar anti-LGBTQ laws, particularly in EU member states (Bulgaria, August 2024) or candidates (Georgia, October 2024), reinforced the argument that the EU’s failure to decisively penalize Hungary for its 2021 law demonstrated weakness, created a sense of impunity, and provided a confidence boost to other governments proposing or adopting similar anti-LGBTQ laws. Human rights organizations like All Out, ILGA-Europe, and Human Rights Watch have argued that the EU's reaction was either too slow, not forceful enough, or failed to use all available mechanisms promptly.

On 22 April 2026, the European Court of Justice ruled that the law violated Article 1 of the EU Charter of Fundamental Rights and Article 2 on the Treaty on European Union, and ordered the Hungarian government to amend or repeal the legislation to comply with European law. The court found that the law violated the fundamental rights of LGBTI residents by discriminating and scapegoating against them, and that the law was "contrary to the very identity of the Union as a common legal order in a society in which pluralism prevails". It marked the first time that either article had been invoked in a ruling by the European Court of Justice.

In September 2026, Prime Minister Péter Magyar announced that the statute would be amended to comply with the European Court's ruling, primarily by removing provisions related to the promotion of homosexuality and gender identity, leaving prohibitions on distributing material containing violent or sexual content that would impair a child's "physical, intellectual, emotional or moral development" to minors. On 13 October 2026, the amendment was passed by Parliament by a vote of 139–51.

=== 2025 Pride ban ===
In March 2025, the Hungarian government passed legislation making it illegal to organize or participate in a public assembly that promotes homosexuality or gender changes to minors in violation of the child protection law. The legislation was intended as a legal basis to prohibit pride parades and similar events, and permitted authorities to use facial recognition software to identify those attending such events. The law sparked a protest outside Parliament which was attended by several thousand. The protesters chanted anti-government slogans and staged a blockade of the Margaret Bridge over the Danube, blocking traffic and disregarding police instructions to leave the area.

On 3 June 2025, the Budapest police denied permits for the 30th edition of Budapest Pride to be held on 28 June, citing the law. The police argued that "it cannot be ruled out, or is even inevitable, that a person under the age of 18 will be able to engage in legally prohibited conduct" should they attend the march. Organizers responded by calling the decision "textbook example of tyranny" and vowed that the event would go on as planned. Mayor of Budapest Gergely Karácsony attempted to reclassify the parade as a "municipal celebration" of the 1991 withdrawal of the Soviet Union from Hungary which, therefore, did not require a permit, but Budapest police asserted that Budapest Pride remained "banned". The parade saw between 100,000 and 200,000 participants and no arrests, in comparison to 35,000 in 2024, placing it among the country's largest anti-governmental protests; attendees protested both in support of LGBT rights, and in opposition towards the Orbán government. In January 2026, Karácsony was criminally charged with organising a public assembly without police authorisation.

In May 2026, it was reported that Budapest authorities had granted permits for Budapest Pride, under the basis that there were no longer legal grounds to prohibit the event due to the European Court of Justice's April 2026 ruling. Criminal charges against Karácsony were also dropped, with prosecutors also citing the EU ruling.

== Living conditions ==
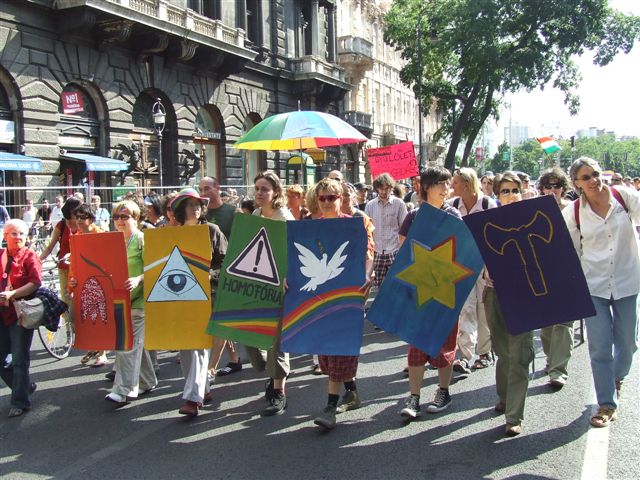
2008 Budapest Gay Dignity Procession (Meleg Méltóság Menet)

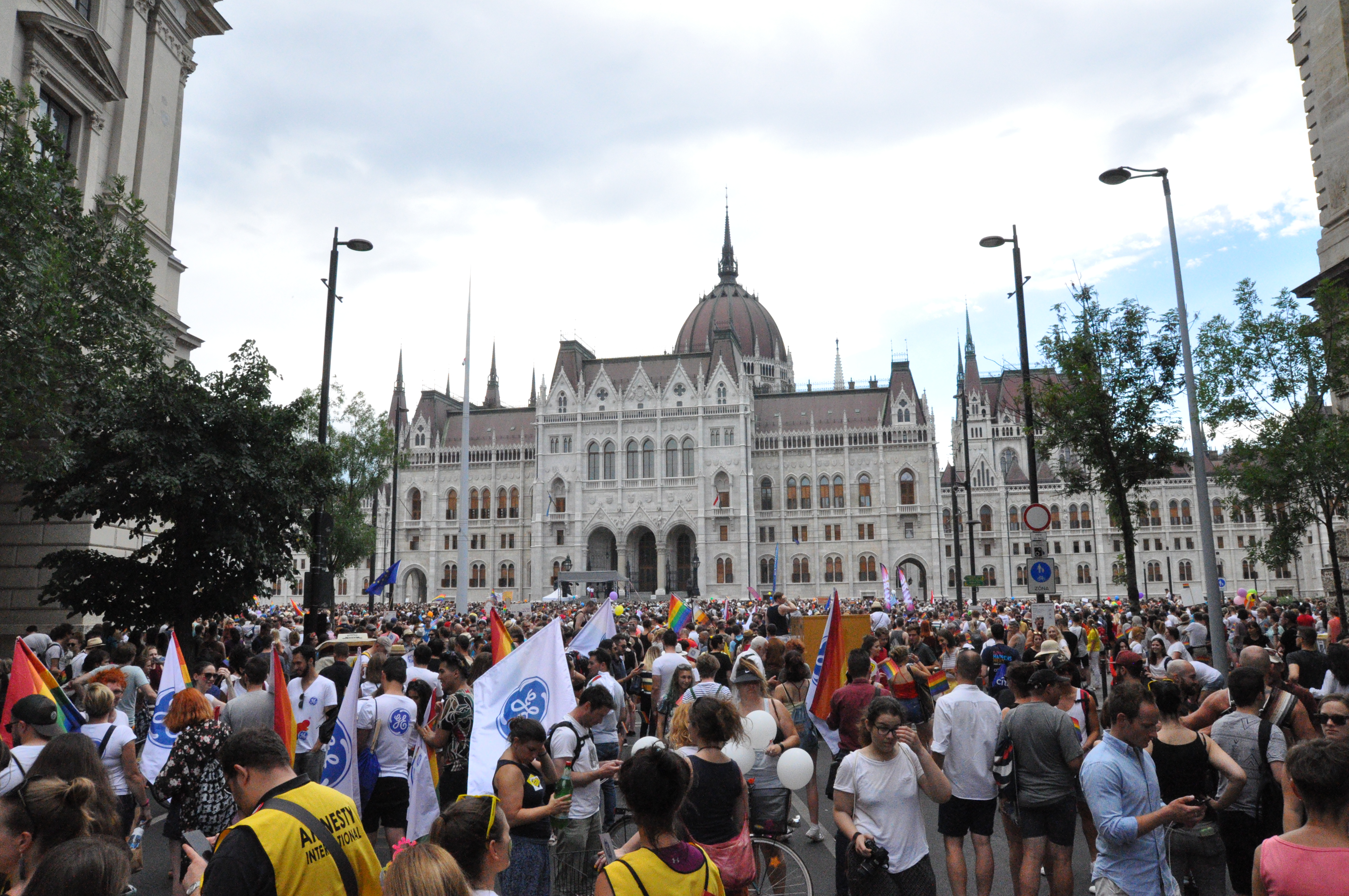
2017 Budapest Pride Festival

Hungary was the host country of Mr Gay Europe 2007 contest and the EuroGames in 2012.

Budapest Pride was the first such event in the former Eastern Bloc, and draws a steady, but a moderate number of LGBTQ people and their supporters. The LGBTQ festival lasts a week every summer with a film festival, a pride march and parties across the city. The festival was opened in the past by notable public figures including Gábor Demszky, then Mayor of Budapest, and Kinga Göncz, then Minister of Foreign Affairs. The Hungarian far-right party Our Homeland Movement has called for a ban on LGBTQ pride marches.

In correlation with the prime ministership of Viktor Orbán, LGBTQ rights in Hungary stalled. In March 2016, the Hungarian Government blocked a proposed European Union agreement to combat discrimination against LGBTQ people. In May 2017, Prime Minister Orbán welcomed the World Congress of Families, a designated hate group by the Southern Poverty Law Center, at the National Parliament. In 2018, Hungary and Poland blocked a joint statement by EU employment and social affairs ministers intended to promote gender equity in the digital era because of objections to a reference to LGBTQ people. However, Austria—then president of the Council of the European Union—adopted the text regardless, though with modifications. While the reference to LGBTQ people was retained, the text was classified as "presidential conclusions" which do not carry the legal weight of formal Council conclusions.

In recent years, more and more politicians have resorted to use openly homophobic rhetoric. In 2014, Jobbik displayed a sign reading "The Parliament Does Not Want Any Deviants" during Budapest Pride, and verbally abused attendees and defaced posters in support of LGBTQ rights. In November 2016, it protested the painting of a fence with rainbow colours in Pomáz, even though the colouring had no connections to LGBTQ rights.

The 2017 Budapest Pride parade attracted thousands of people, and received the support of many embassies, including from Australia, Canada, France, Germany, the United Kingdom and the United States, as well as neighbouring Slovakia and Slovenia, among others.

In January 2018, the European Court of Justice ruled that asylum seekers may not be subjected by authorities to psychological tests in order to determine their sexual orientation.

On 12 April 2026, the Tisza Party defeated Fidesz in the parliamentary election, ending Viktor Orbán's 16-year regime as prime minister of Hungary. The party restrained from explicitly campaigning on LGBTQ rights, but party leader and prime minister-designate Péter Magyar did express support for freedom of assembly in opposition to the attempts to ban Pride parades, and stated during a victory speech that Hungary should be a country "where no one is stigmatised for thinking differently than the majority, or loving someone differently than the majority".

While these remarks were seen as indicating that Magyar's government may take a more supportive stance on LGBTQ rights in comparison to Orbán, some LGBT rights activists expressed concerns over the party's lack of specific commitments or timeline. Human Rights Watch called upon the new government to ensure the 2021 child protection law was repealed or amended in compliance with the European Court of Justice's ruling. In September 2026, Magyar announced his intent to begin repealing Orbán-era policies, including the ban on adoption by same-sex couples, and planned amendments to the child protection law to remove provisions prohibiting the promotion of homosexuality and gender identity. Human Rights Watch welcomed these developments, but noted that there were still other instances of discriminatory provisions in law that also needed to be addressed.

== Public opinion ==
Public opinion on same-sex marriage (2026 Medián poll)
1. Strongly favor (47.0%)
2. Somewhat favor (21.0%)
3. Not sure (2.00%)
4. Somewhat oppose (11.0%)
5. Strongly oppose (19.0%)

According to a Eurobarometer survey published in December 2006, only 18% of Hungarians surveyed supported same-sex marriage, and only 13% recognized a same-sex couple's right to adopt, compared to the EU-wide average of 44% and 33%, respectively. However, a poll conducted a year after, in 2007, indicated that 30% of the Hungarian public supported same-sex marriage.

The poll taken in 2015 found 39% of Hungarians supported same-sex marriage. A poll by the Pew Research Center, published in May 2017, found that 27% of Hungarians were in favor of same-sex marriage, while 64% opposed it. Support was higher among non-religious people (34%) and 18–34 year olds (39%), in contrast to Catholics (25%) and people aged 35 and over (23%). In May 2015, PlanetRomeo, an LGBTQ social network, published its first Gay Happiness Index (GHI). Gay men from over 120 countries were asked about how they feel about society's view on homosexuality, how they experience the way they are treated by other people and how satisfied are they with their lives. Hungary was ranked 49th with a GHI score of 47.

According to a 2017 poll carried out by ILGA, 64% of Hungarians agreed that gay, lesbian and bisexual people should enjoy the same rights as straight people, while 15% disagreed. Additionally, 69% agreed that they should be protected from workplace discrimination. 13% of Hungarians, however, said that people who are in same-sex relationships should be charged as criminals, while 64% disagreed. As for transgender people, 60% agreed that they should have the same rights, 64% believed they should be protected from employment discrimination and a plurality of 48% believed they should be allowed to change their legal gender.

A poll by the Pew Research Center, published in 2023, found that 31% of Hungarians were in favor of same-sex marriage, while 63% opposed it. A GLOBSEC survey conducted in March 2023 showed that 56% of Hungarians supported same-sex marriage, while 37% were opposed. The 2023 Eurobarometer found that 42% of Hungarians thought same-sex marriage should be allowed throughout Europe, and 49% agreed that "there is nothing wrong in a sexual relationship between two persons of the same sex".

A 2026 Medián poll following the elections showed that 68% of Hungarians supported same-sex marriage and adoption rights, 71% supported allowing artificial insemination for lesbians, and 79% agreed that it is the state's duty to act against LGBT discrimination. The poll also showed that 57% of Hungarians supported the reversal of anti-LGBT policies, 23% supported keeping them as-is, and 10% supported further restrictions.

== Summary table ==
Same-sex sexual activity legal	Yes (Since 1961)
Equal age of consent (14)	Yes (Since 2002)
Freedom of expression	No (Laws censor LGBTQ issues, pride parades banned indefinitely.)
Anti-discrimination laws in employment	Yes (Since 2004)
Anti-discrimination laws in the provision of goods and services	Yes (Since 2004)
Anti-discrimination laws in all other areas (incl. indirect discrimination, hate speech)	Yes (Since 2004)
Same-sex civil partnerships	Yes (Since 20 April 2009)
Same-sex marriage	No (Constitutional ban since 2012)
Recognition of same-sex couples	Yes (Since 1996)
Adoption by a single LGBTQ person	No (Constitutional ban since 2020)
Stepchild adoption by same-sex couples	No (Constitutional ban since 2020)
Joint adoption by same-sex couples	No (Constitutional ban since 2020)
LGB people allowed to serve openly in the military	Yes
Transgender people allowed to serve openly in the military	No
Conversion therapy banned on minors	No
Right to change legal gender	No (de facto banned since 2018, de jure banned since 2020)
Access to IVF for lesbian couples	No (Available to single women, but not to lesbian couples)
Commercial surrogacy for gay male couples	No (Banned regardless of sexual orientation)
MSM allowed to donate blood	Yes (Since 2020)

== See also ==
- 2025 Hungarian Pride ban
- Human rights in Hungary
- Hungarian anti-LGBTQ law
- "Mások" ("Others", monthly Hungarian LGBTQ magazine)
- List of gay-rights organizations#Hungary
- LGBTQ history in Hungary
- LGBTQ rights in Europe
- LGBTQ rights in the European Union
