= Hungarian anti-LGBTQ law =

Anti-LGBTI law in Hungary

National Assembly of Hungary
- Long title: Act LXXIX of 2021 on taking more severe action against paedophile offenders and amending certain acts for the protection of children
- Passed by: National Assembly of Hungary
- Passed: 15 June 2021
- Signed by: President János Áder
- Signed: 23 June 2021
- Commenced: 1 July 2021

Legislative history
- Bill title: Act on taking more severe actions against paedophile offenders and amending certain Acts for the protection of children
- Introduced by: Csaba Hende (Fidesz)
- Voting summary: 157 voted for; 1 voted against; 51 absent

Summary
- Prohibits minors from accessing any and all content pertaining to LGBTI people and LGBTI rights

Keywords
- LGBTI people, LGBTI rights
- Status: Amended

Act LXXIX of 2021 on taking more severe action against paedophile offenders and amending certain acts for the protection of children, is a law of Hungary. Passed on 15 June 2021, the bill prohibits the distribution of violent and sexual content to minors if it is considered harmful to their "physical, intellectual, emotional or moral development", and increases penalties for child sexual abuse and creating, distributing, or possessing child pornography.

The original bill enjoyed broad support across the political spectrum in Hungary. However, a last-minute amendment added provisions that prohibited the distribution of materials that "promote" homosexuality, gender identity, or gender transition to minors. The amended bill was passed by Parliament 157–1, with support from Viktor Orbán's ruling Fidesz party, the Christian Democratic People's Party (KDNP), and Jobbik; opposition parties boycotted the final vote in protest of the surprise amendment. The amended law was part of a larger wave of anti-LGBTQ policies enacted by Orbán's far-right government, intending to appeal to its Christian nationalist base by promoting "traditional" values, and falsely conflate pedophilia with the LGBTQ community (whom the government portrayed as a threat to Christianity in Hungary).

The law was condemned as an attack on fundamental freedoms, discrimination against LGBTQ people; the European Commission launched infringement proceedings against Hungary in July 2021, challenging the law as a violation of the European Union's Charter of Fundamental Rights. The case—Commission v Hungary—was taken to the European Court of Justice with the backing of the European Parliament and 16 member states. In April 2026, the Court of Justice of the European Union (CJEU) ruled that the bill violated Article 1 of the EU Charter of Fundamental Rights and Article 2 on the Treaty on European Union, finding that it violated fundamental rights of LGBTI residents by discriminating and scapegoating against them, and that the law was "contrary to the very identity of the Union as a common legal order in a society in which pluralism prevails". It was the first time in that either article has been implemented in a ruling by the CJEU.

The same month, Péter Magyar and his Tisza Party defeated Orbán in the 2026 parliamentary election, ending his 16-year tenure as Prime Minister. In September 2026, Magyar announced his government's intent to amend the child protection law to comply with the CJEU ruling; an amendment to remove the LGBTQ-related provisions was passed by Parliament in October 2026.

== Amendments ==
The legislative amendments to the law ban sharing LGBTQ-related information with minors, considering it to be promoting homosexuality or gender reassignment. The amendments touch upon multiple legal fields and domains. The provisions of the anti-LGBTQ law included amendments to five Acts of Parliament: (1) Act no. XXXI of 1997 on the protection of children and guardianship administration; (2) Act no. CCXI of 2011 on the protection of families; (3) Act no. XLVIII of 2008 on the basic conditions of and certain restrictions on economic advertising activities; (4) Act no. CLXXXV of 2010 on media services and mass communication; and (5) Act no. CXC of 2011 on national public education.

=== Main argument ===
The basis of the following amendments is the added section to the Act XXXI of 1997 on the protection of children and guardianship administration, stating that "the State shall protect the right of children to a self-identity corresponding to their sex at birth." On the pretense of the rights of the child, it is then "forbidden to make accessible to persons who have not attained the age of eighteen years content that is (...) propagates or portrays divergence from self-identity corresponding to sex at birth, sex change or homosexuality.”

=== Sex education ===
Against this background, the bill lays down two sets of obligations concerning education. It prohibits the provision of courses on sex education, biology, natural sciences or health that mention anything other than the biparental, heterosexual image of the family. The law specifically provides for the following amendments regarding sex education courses. First, the law establishes a prohibition to expose minors to any pornographic content and to any content that portrays other than the conservative image of family and sex, for instance, gender reassignment, non-heterosexual orientation, homoparental family or single-parent family. Second, the law introduces a system of registration and accreditation for NGOs that provide sex education courses to minors, thus hindering in practice the provision of comprehensive, science-based and inclusive courses, especially for LGBTQ-led organisations. Third, the law amends Act II of 2012 on Petty Offences and criminalises teachers and headteachers that allow the provisions to students of comprehensive, science-based, inclusive courses, especially by LGBTQ-led organisations.

As a result of the anti-LGBTQ law, access to schools by external experts and organizations for the purposes of holding classes – among others – on sexuality is limited. The anti-LGBTQ law prescribes that only experts and organizations that are registered by a special public body may conduct sexual education in schools. However, since the passage of the law, no public body facilitating such registrations had been established. In the absence of the implementing legislation, currently no civil society organization or external expert may hold sex education classes in institutions of public education. As a result, teachers are unable to invite any experts to talk about sexuality. This de facto ban has been implemented so broadly that even an NGO with a human rights educations program that does not focus on LGBTQ issues was still banned from schools that they have been working with for many years.

=== Media content ===
The amendments provide that all media content, such as books and movies, which portrays "non-traditional families" or refers to "non-traditional gender identities" shall be immediately recognisable via a disclaimer or other similar message mentioning that they show a "non-traditional" family image. Families seen as "non-traditional" include monoparental families, non-heterosexual families, families with a member belonging to the LGBTQ community, etc. It includes restrictions on LGBTQ representation in the media by banning content depicting LGBTQ topics from television and prohibiting companies from running campaigns in solidarity with the LGBTQ community. Violations of the law can be punished with fines or a prison sentence.

=== Books sales ===
On 6 August 2021, a resulting implementing regulation amending law regarding commercial activities was issued and published in the official journal of Hungary (Magyar Közlöny). It adds limitations to the sale of products intended for children, which display deviation from one's birth gender identity, gender reassignment or homosexuality and products portraying sexuality in a self-serving way. As per the new limitations, these products must be taken out of youth sections, put in closed foil packaging to prevent browsing, must not be placed in a store's window, and cannot be sold within 200 metres (approximately 656 feet) of schools, youth institutions, churches, and other places dedicated to the practice of religion. The new legislation will entered into force thirty days from its issuing, and compliance will be monitored by the consumer protection authorities. Under Section 27 (1) of the decree, the notary of the local government can suspend certain commercial activities or close the shop for a maximum of 90 days if such rules are violated. According to Section 27 (2), in case the owner does not comply with the requirements imposed by the notary, the notary can permanently close down the shop.

=== Use of vague language ===
The Amendment to Act CCXI of 2011 on the protection of families (Act section 10) states that "[...] it shall be forbidden to make accessible to persons who have not attained the age of eighteen years content that [...] propagates or portrays divergence from self-identity corresponding to sex at birth, sex change or homosexuality.” The vague language used in the law raised fears among same sex couples that simple acts like holding hands on the street would end up labeled as "promotion of homosexuality" and lead to arrests.

== Background ==
=== Previous attempts ===
In April 2012, Jobbik, then a far-right nationalist party, tried to introduce a bill into the Hungarian parliament that would change the national constitution to allegedly "protect public morals and the mental health of the young generations" by banning the popularization of "sexual deviancy". The legislation was drafted by party spokesman Ádám Mirkóczki. This was to target "homosexuality, sex changes, transvestitism, bisexuality and paedophile behaviour". The proposed amendments would criminalise anyone who "popularizes their sexual relations—deviancy—with another person of the same sex, or other disturbances of sexual behaviour, before the wider public". The penalty would be three years in prison, or five years if 'popularizing' is done in front of minors. The draft legislation ultimately failed to pass.

=== The legislative process ===
In the parliamentary session of 15 June 2021, Fidesz MP Csaba Hende, Chairman of the Legislative Committee in the Hungarian Parliament and Deputy Speaker for Legislation, submitted the bill. Members of the left-wing opposition parties (Hungarian Socialist Party, Democratic Coalition, LMP - Hungary's Green Party and Dialogue for Hungary), as well as some independent MPs such as Bernadett Szél, Ákos Hadházy and Szabolcs Szabó boycotted the session and didn't participate in the vote. The MPs who were present almost unanimously approved the legislation on a 157–1 vote. All present members of the ruling Fidesz party and of the right-wing opposition parties Jobbik and Mi Hazánk, as well as some independent MPs such as Imre Ritter voted in favour. Independent MP Sándor Székely voted against it. The law was signed by President János Áder on 23 June and went into effect on 7 July 2021.

== Developments ==
=== In Hungary ===
==== Government Decree ====
On 6 August 2021, Government Decree 473/2021 amending Government Decree 210/2009 on the conditions for carrying out commercial activities was adopted, as an implementation regulation. It limits the sales of products targeting children "depicting or propagating divergence from self-identity corresponding to sex at birth, sex change and homosexuality". This decree had a major impact on books sales in particular. According to the law, any such products cannot be sold within 200m of schools, children or youth institutions and churches, has to be wrapped in plastic foil to prevent browsing, can not be displayed in shopping windows, and must be removed from youth sections. Under Section 27 (1) of the decree, the notary of the local government can suspend certain commercial activities or close the shop for a maximum of 90 days if such rules are violated. According to Section 27 (2), in case the owner does not comply with the requirements imposed by the notary, the notary can permanently close down the shop.

==== 2022 Referendum ====
The Hungarian government announced a referendum on the law which was held on 3 April 2022. The share of valid votes in the referendum was below the required 50%. Thus, it became invalid, but the law remained in force.

==== 2025 Pride ban ====
On 18 March 2025, the Hungarian parliament adopted amendments to the Act LV of 2018 on the right of assembly, commonly known as the Freedom of Assembly law. Building on the provisions of the 2021 anti-LGBTQ law, the pride ban is an executive act of the 2021 law. The newly adopted amendments prohibit holding a gathering that "promotes or displays any deviation from a person's gender at birth, as well as gender reassignment and homosexuality". Participating in such events will be punishable by a fine up to the equivalent of 500 euros, while organizing them will be considered a criminal offence, punishable by up to one year in prison under the Criminal Code. It will also permit the use of facial recognition software to identify and file participants, violating the EU’s GDPR and AI regulations. The bill was pushed through Parliament within a day and will enter into force on 15 April 2025.

The amendment of the Assembly Law was accompanied by a constitutional change, stating that "the right of children to physical, psychological, and moral development precedes all rights except the right to life". Such change to the constitution effectively makes fundamental rights of children precede all other fundamental rights, including the right to assembly, except the right to life. Interpreted in light of the 2021 anti-LGBTQ law, the rights of children are mainly the rights to not be exposed to LGBTQ content. This constitutional change, namely the 15th Amendment to the Fundamental Law (the Hungarian Constitution), has not yet been voted on in Parliament. Its vote is planned for April 2025. Additionally, it would constitutionally prohibit legal gender recognition, recognizing only biological sex. The amendment violates Article 2 of the Treaty on the European Union and the Charter of Fundamental Rights of the EU.

These legal developments were implemented following Prime Minister Viktor Orbán's statement, in which he announced his intention to ban the annual Pride March.

=== Romania ===
In Romania in August 2021, the Eurosceptic party Alliance for the Union of Romanians (AUR), which has been described as far-right, proposed a similar law to the Hungarian law. This was also supported by the Hungarian-Romanian Democratic Alliance of Hungarians in Romania (RMDSZ), the Hungarian People's Party of Transylvania and the Hungarian Civic Party (Romania).

== Reactions ==
=== Domestic ===
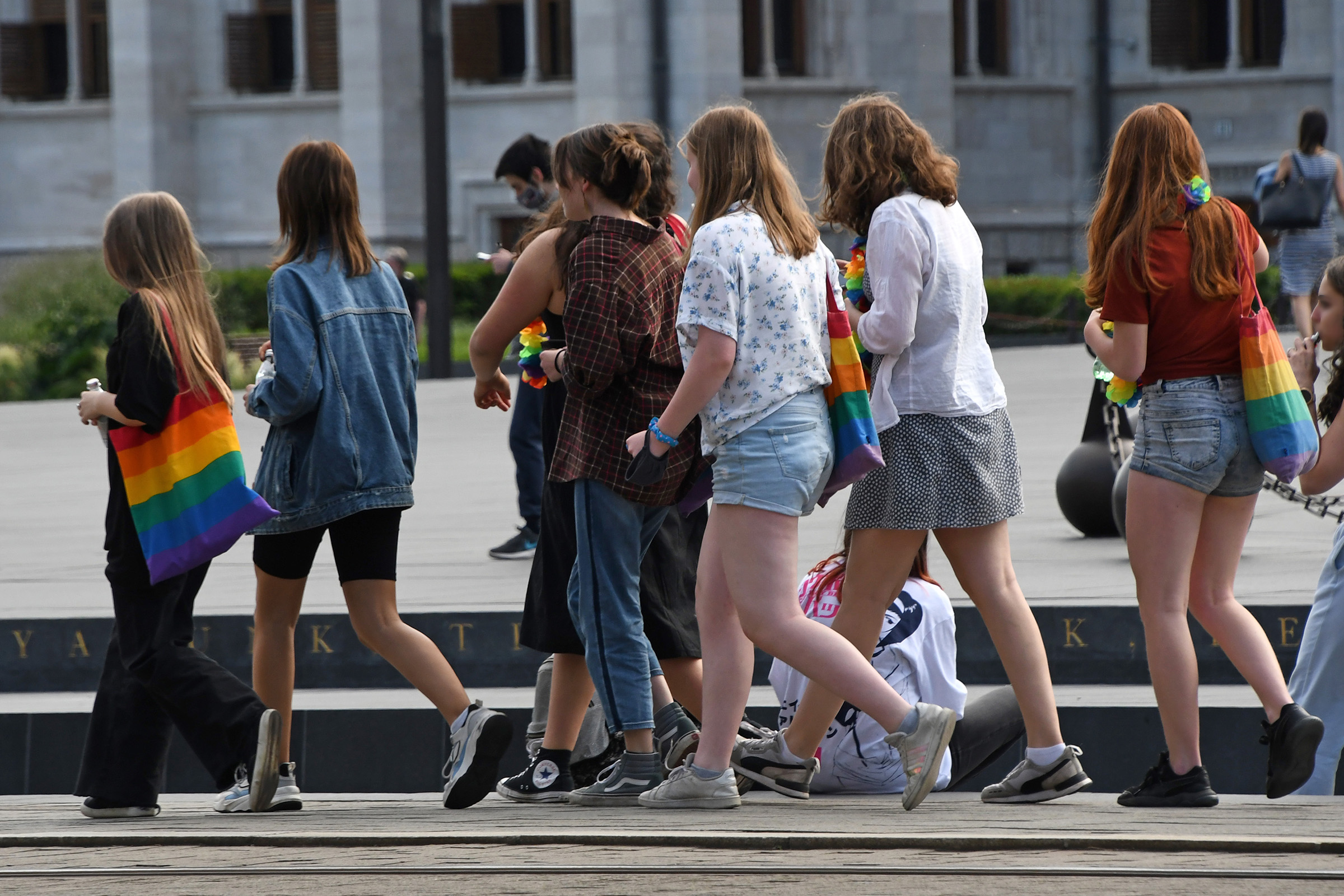
People going to a protest on 14 June 2021 against the anti-LGBTQ law in Budapest.

The amendments sparked a series of protests in Hungary by members and supporters of the LGBTQ community and by human rights groups. A petition and letter were written to President János Áder of Hungary, urging him not to sign the law. The online petition had been signed more than ten thousand times as of 7 August 2021.

The human rights group Amnesty International Hungary also asked people to sign its own petition made together with Budapest Pride, Háttér Society, Labrisz Leszbikus Egyesület, the Hungarian Helsinki Committee and TASZ (the Hungarian Civil Liberties Union) and supported by the LGBTQ section of the Hungarian Psychological Society, asking ombudsman Dr Ákos Kozma to send the law to the Constitutional Court of Hungary. The latter petition had been signed over eleven thousand times as of 7 August 2021.

=== Continental ===
EU statement regarding the Hungarian anti-LGBTQ law: Joined the EU declaration Did not join the EU declaration Did not join due to president neutrality Not an EU country

==== European Union ====
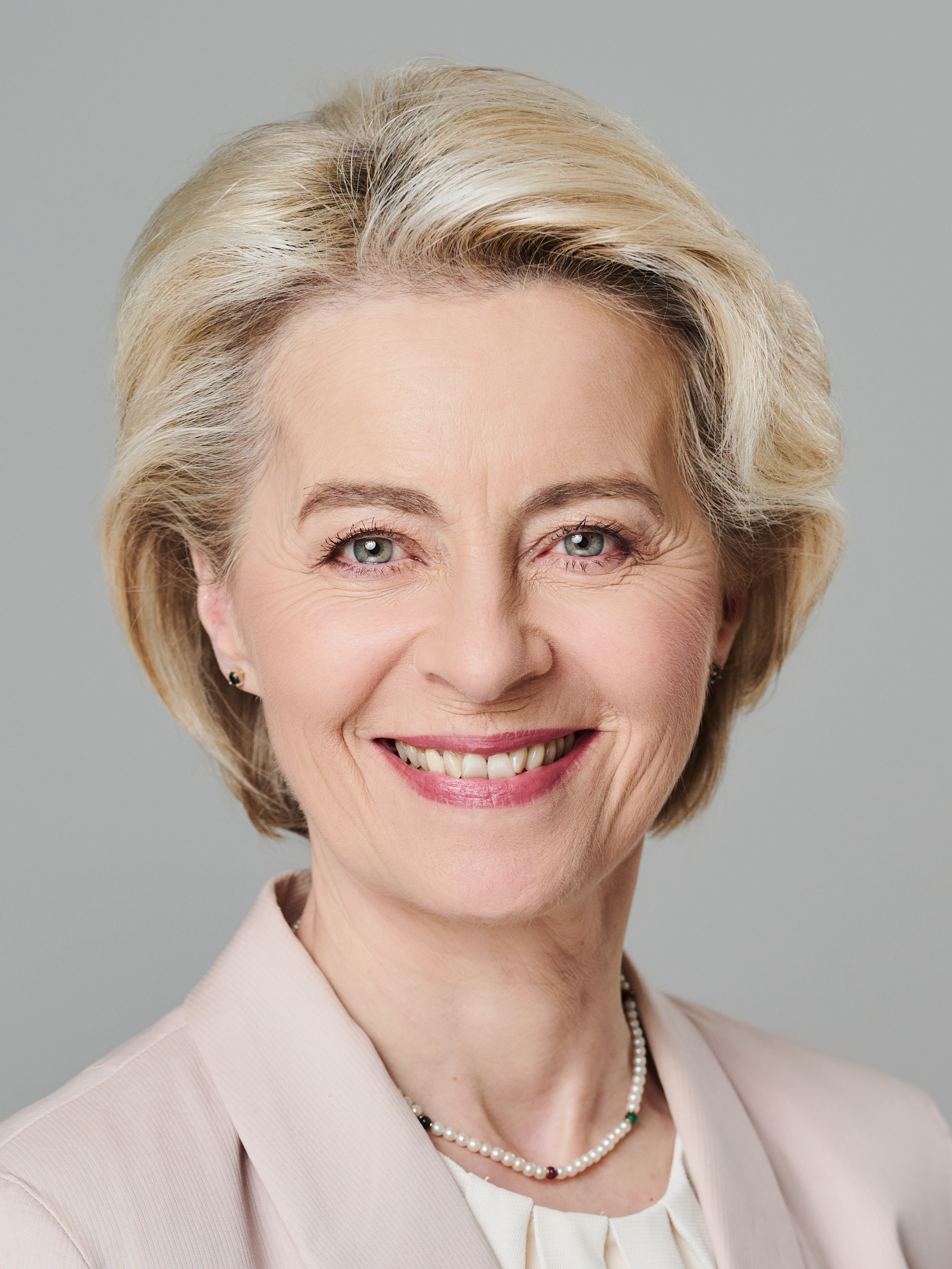
Ursula von der Leyen, the President of the European Commission condemned the law as discrimination against LGBTI people.

The bill was met with immediate condemnation from high-ranking officials of several EU countries and groups of the European Parliament. On 22 June 2021, the law was discussed in the Council of the European Union. In total, sixteen out of twenty-seven states condemned it, with Belgium, the Netherlands and Luxembourg issuing a critical statement that called the law a breach of the Charter of Fundamental Rights of the European Union, and urged the European Commission to use all the tools at its disposal to ensure compliance with European laws, including recourse to the European Court of Justice. The statement was immediately endorsed by Denmark, Estonia, Finland, France, Germany, Ireland, Lithuania, Spain, Sweden and Latvia, by Italy at the end of the meeting and by Austria and Greece on the following day. In a response to the statement, Hungarian Foreign Minister Péter Szijjártó dismissed all negative opinions and urged critics to read the law in its entirety.

The president of European Commission, Ursula von der Leyen expressed concern and tweeted: "I believe in a Europe which embraces diversity, not one which hides it from our children. No one should be discriminated on the basis of sexual orientation".

On 25 June 2021, the new Hungarian legislation was heavily discussed at a summit of the leaders of the EU. Dutch Prime Minister Mark Rutte told Prime Minister of Hungary Viktor Orbán: "If you don't like it, there is also an alternative: leave the [European] Union". French President Emmanuel Macron said the law "doesn't seem to be in line with our values" and he hoped it could be changed through dialogue. Prime Minister Xavier Bettel of Luxembourg said he would tell Orbán he was wrong to conflate homosexuality with paedophilia within the law. Polish ambassador to Germany Andrzej Przylebski argued that it was "evident and beyond doubt" that the Hungarian parliament had the right to protect schoolchildren by law from having to deal with issues such as homosexuality and said: "This has nothing to do with intolerance, let alone persecuting homosexuals".

==== European Commission for Democracy through Law ====
In December 2021, the European Commission for Democracy through Law released its findings that the law conflicted with the European Convention on Human Rights and other international human rights standards. The law was too vague to meet the requirement of foreseeability, infringed on the right of freedom of expression, and discriminated on the basis of sexual orientation and gender identity.

=== International ===
==== United Nations ====
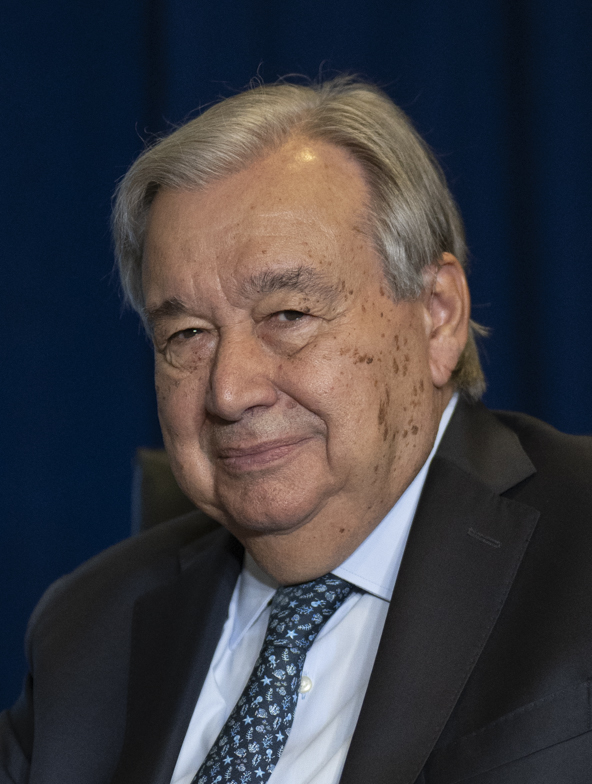
Antonio Guterres, the Secretary-General of the United Nations condemned the law as discrimination against LGBTI people.

The Secretary-General of the United Nations, António Guterres, condemned the law, stating that "No discrimination is acceptable in any circumstances, and any discrimination against LGBTIQ+ people is totally unacceptable in our modern societies". The United Nations Independent Expert on sexual orientation and gender identity, Victor Madrigal-Borloz, contemned the law, stating that "This legislation tends to perpetuate stereotypes and stigma around sexual orientation and gender identity" and slammed the law for falsely conflating LGBTI people with pedophiles, stating that it is "disgraceful".

==== United States ====
The Embassy of the United States in Budapest expressed deep concern about Hungary's law being anti-LGBTQ and stated: "The United States stands for the idea that governments should promote freedom of expression and protect human rights, including the rights of members of the LGBTQI+ community".

=== Other ===
On 23 June 2021, the German men's national football team was to host the Hungarian team at the Allianz Arena in Munich as part of the 2020 UEFA European Championship. A petition was started that asked Jürgen Muth, manager of the Allianz Arena, Aleksander Čeferin, president of the UEFA, Fritz Keller, president of the German Football Association and Andreas Jung, director of FC Bayern Munich to light the arena with rainbow colours in solidarity with the LGBTQ community of Hungary and in protest against the law. The petition was signed over three hundred thousand times, but it was rejected by the UEFA that issued a statement saying that "UEFA (...) is a politically and religiously neutral organization. Given the political context of this specific request ― a message aiming at a decision taken by the Hungarian national parliament ― UEFA must decline this request." Instead, they suggested that the arena be lit up on another day. Mayor Dieter Reiter of Munich called the decision "shameful", while Foreign Minister Péter Szijjártó of Hungary welcomed the decision as a sign of "common sense".

The city of Munich lit up its town hall and several other landmarks in rainbow colours to protest the decision, alongside several German football clubs illuminating their stadiums with a rainbow flag for the duration of the game.

== Implementation ==
=== TV content ===
One of Hungary's largest commercial TV Channels, RTL Klub, refused to air public service adverts for the 2022 Budapest Pride festival, arguing that airing such content was banned by the anti-LGBTQ law. In 2021, RTL, afraid that the movie Jenny's Wedding would be banned by the law, contacted the Media Council of the National Media and Infocommunications Authority, who re-assessed the categorization of the movie by declaring it unsuitable for minors under the age 18. The movie has no nudity or sex, and has received a PG-13 categorization in the US, 12 in the UK and 7 in Spain. In 2023, the Media Council ruled that a short film promoting Budapest Pride could only be shown between 10 pm and 5 am, a ruling which RTL as well as Budapest Pride filed a complaint against.

=== Books ===
The sale of books with LGBTQ content has faced the most severe difficulties since the adoption of the law. On July 13, 2023, a Budapest government office sent a fine of 12 million forints (€30,000) to Hungary's second-largest bookstore, Lira, for selling British author Alice Oseman's "Heartstopper", among other books for minors, without wrapping them in plastic foil.

=== Youth health websites and initiatives ===
Kamaszpanasz, a young health website, deleted LGBTQ content and re-categorized the remainder as not suitable under 18, even those that simply explained the meaning of "sexual orientation". Content discussing straight sex practices was not removed, neither re-categorized.

In June 2021, Eötvös Loránd University Faculty of Humanities posted an LGBTQ booklet on its official Instagram page, only for it to be removed a few days later due to external pressure of the far-right Sixty-Four Counties Youth Movement. The university subsequently argued that they would not be able to republish the LGBTQ booklet as it would be illegal under the anti-LGBTQ law.

=== Commercial brands ===
Cosmetics company NYX Professional Makeup restricted its Hungarian Instagram page for people under 18 years out of fear they might violate the law due to the occasional presence of rainbow-colored makeups and Pride-related challenges.

International companies such as Coca-Cola, H&M and Levi's have likewise ceased making Hungarian Pride-related advertisements since the adoption of the anti-LGBTQ law.

== Aftermath and effects on the Hungarian LGBTQ community ==
=== Surge in homophobic attacks ===
According to a report by Hungarian LGBTQ civil organisation, Háttér Society, there was a surge in homophobic attacks after the introduction of the new law. The report added that verbal aggression was the most frequent, with some conflicts escalating into threats of violence and even committing violent acts against LGBTQ people or harming their property.

=== De facto ban on sexual education ===
Since the passage of the law, no public body facilitating registrations of experts and organizations able to provide sexual education has been established. As a result, teachers are unable to invite any experts to talk about sexuality. This de facto ban has been implemented so broadly that even an NGO with a human rights educations program that does not focus on LGBTQ issues was still banned from schools that they have been working with for many years. Some schools have privately revealed to Háttér Society that only conservative NGOs linked to Orbán's Fidesz can be invited without being registered. In addition, several teachers, school psychologists and nurses have reported that they have been banned from discussing LGBTQ issues with their students. Those that try to maintain a supportive approach with their students are put under immense pressure, as they risk having their name and photo appearing on a public list of teachers, compiled by a far-right news portal. Even the private lives of school professionals aren't left untouched; according to Háttér Society, one school psychologist who in her free time works as an LGBTQ rights activist, was asked by her school to sign a document to promise not to mention during her activism that she works as a school psychologist. A lesbian teacher was forced to quit after being pressured by the director of the school. A child was prevented from picking a rainbow as her kindergarten sign, out of the school's fear of violating the law.

== European Union Court of Justice case ==
On 15 July 2021, the European Commission started infringement proceedings against Hungary for breaching guarantees of freedom of expression and non-discrimination in the EU Charter of Fundamental Rights, by sending a letter of formal notice.

On 2 December, the EU Commission announced it had sent a reasoned opinion to Hungary.

On 15 July 2022, the Commission referred the case to the European Court of Justice (ECJ), not having received an adequate response from Hungary.

The Commission suspended over €700 million in EU cohesion funding due to Hungary's refusal to repeal the Law, arguing that it violates the horizontal enabling condition related to the EU Charter of Fundamental Rights, a precondition for accessing EU funds.

As of April 2023, 16 member states (Belgium, France, Germany, Luxembourg, the Netherlands, Austria, Ireland, Malta, Denmark, Portugal, Spain, Sweden, Slovenia, Finland, Greece, and later Estonia) and the European Parliament joined the case in support of the Commission. The number of Member States supporting the case effectively making this the largest human rights case in the history of the EU.

In April 2026, the ECJ ruled that the anti-LGBTI provisions in the child protection law violated Article 2 of the Treaty of the European Union and Article 1 of the Charter of Fundamental Rights of the European Union: the court found that Hungary had so seriously systematically violated the fundamental rights of LGBTI people by attempting to exclude, isolate, and sideline them from society that the law violates "the very identity of the Union" as inscribed in Article 2 TEU. It is the first time in the history of the European Union that either article has been implemented in a ruling by the Court of Justice of the European Union.

The court further found that Hungary had discriminated against LGBTI people on the basis of both sex and sexual orientation, violating fundamental freedoms of the European Union. The judgment observed that the law falsely conflated LGBTI people with pedophiles, an association which "stigmatises and marginalises" LGBTI people and encourages hostility. Ultimately, the Court noted that the legislation was an attempt to portray LGBTI people as a threat to society.

The rapid spread of similar anti-LGBTQ laws, particularly in EU member states (Bulgaria, August 2024) or candidates (Georgia, October 2024), reinforced the argument that the EU’s failure to decisively penalize Hungary for its 2021 law demonstrated weakness, created a sense of impunity, and provided a confidence boost to other governments proposing or adopting similar anti-LGBTQ laws. Human rights organizations like All Out, ILGA-Europe, and Human Rights Watch have argued that the EU's reaction was either too slow, not forceful enough, or failed to use all available mechanisms promptly.

== Aftermath ==
Following the ECJ ruling, Budapest Pride received police permits for its 2026 event, with authorities citing that there was no legal basis to deny permission for the event due to the ECJ ruling: the 2025 event became an unsanctioned assembly in response to a related bill that banned public assemblies that violated the child protection law. Criminal charges against mayor Gergely Karácsony for holding an illegal public assembly were also dropped.

In September 2026, new prime minister Péter Magyar—whose Tisza Party defeated Orbán in the April 2026 parliamentary election—announced his intent to begin rolling back some of the Orbán-era anti-LGBTQ policies, including amending the child protection law to make it compliant with the ECJ's ruling. The bill would remain in force, but amended to only prohibit the distribution of violent or sexual content that impairs a child's "physical, intellectual, emotional or moral development" to minors, and remove specific references to LGBTQ-related topics. Magyar positioned the amendment as a strengthening of the bill's mandate by not limiting it to LGBTQ-related topics. On 13 October 2026, Parliament approved the amendment.

== See also ==
- LGBTQ rights in Hungary
- LGBTQ rights in the European Union
- LGBTQ rights in Europe
- 2025 Hungarian Pride ban
- LGBTQ sex education
- Education and the LGBTQ community
