= Zimir (C‑662/23) =

2025 European Court of Justice decision

- European Court of Justice

Submitted 9 November 2023 Decided 8 May 2025
- Full case name: Staatssecretaris van Justitie en Veiligheid v X.
- Case: C‑662/23
- CelexID: 62023CJ0662
- ECLI: ECLI:EU:C:2025:326
- Case type: Reference for a preliminary ruling
- Chamber: Fifth Chamber
- Language of proceedings: Dutch
- Nationality of parties: The Netherlands
- Procedural history: Council of State (Netherlands) ECLI:NL:RVS:2023:4125

Court composition
- Judge-Rapporteur; Jan Passer
- President es:Lourdes Arastey
- Judges: D. Gratsias; E. Regan; Ben Smulders
- Advocate General; L. Medina

Legislation affecting
- Interprets article 31(3)(b) of Directive 2013/32/EU

Keywords
- Asylum procedure, extension of decision period, EU asylum law

Staatssecretaris van Justitie en Veiligheid v X (C‑662/23), also known as the Zimir judgment, is a decision by the Court of Justice of the European Union (CJEU) concerning the extension of time limits for deciding asylum applications under Directive 2013/32/EU.

== Background ==
The case arose in the Netherlands, where the asylum application of Mr. Zimir, a Turkish national, was not decided within the standard six-month period prescribed by Article 31(3) of the Asylum Procedures Directive. The Dutch Immigration and Naturalisation Service (IND) extended the period by nine months, citing a large number of pending cases. Zimir contested the extension, claiming it was incompatible with EU law.

== Legal Questions ==
The Dutch Council of State referred questions to the CJEU regarding the interpretation of Article 31(3)(b) of Directive 2013/32/EU:

- Whether a gradual increase in simultaneous asylum applications can justify the extension of the six-month decision period.
- What qualifies as a "large number" of applications.
- Whether there is a time frame within which the increase must occur.
- Whether factors such as administrative backlog or staffing shortages may be considered in extending the decision period.

== Advocate General's Opinion ==
Advocate General L. Medina issued an opinion on 12 December 2024, stating that the extension of the six-month period can only be justified by a sudden, substantial increase in applications, not by structural inefficiencies or gradual growth in caseloads.

== Judgment ==
The CJEU held that the six-month period for deciding asylum applications is the standard under EU law. Extensions up to fifteen months are allowed only in exceptional cases involving a sudden and significant increase in asylum applications. Structural factors such as pre-existing backlogs or staff shortages cannot justify a delay. Therefore, the Dutch practice of routinely applying such extensions was ruled incompatible with EU law.

== Implications ==
The judgment has significant implications for asylum policy across the EU. As of March 2025, over 18,000 asylum seekers in the Netherlands had been waiting more than six months. Following the ruling, national authorities must justify any extension based strictly on the criteria established by the directive and the judgment.

== See also ==
- Immigration and Naturalisation Service (Netherlands)
- Migration and asylum policy of the European Union
