= Law of Hungary =

The law of Hungary is civil law. It was first codified during the socialist period.

== Constitution ==
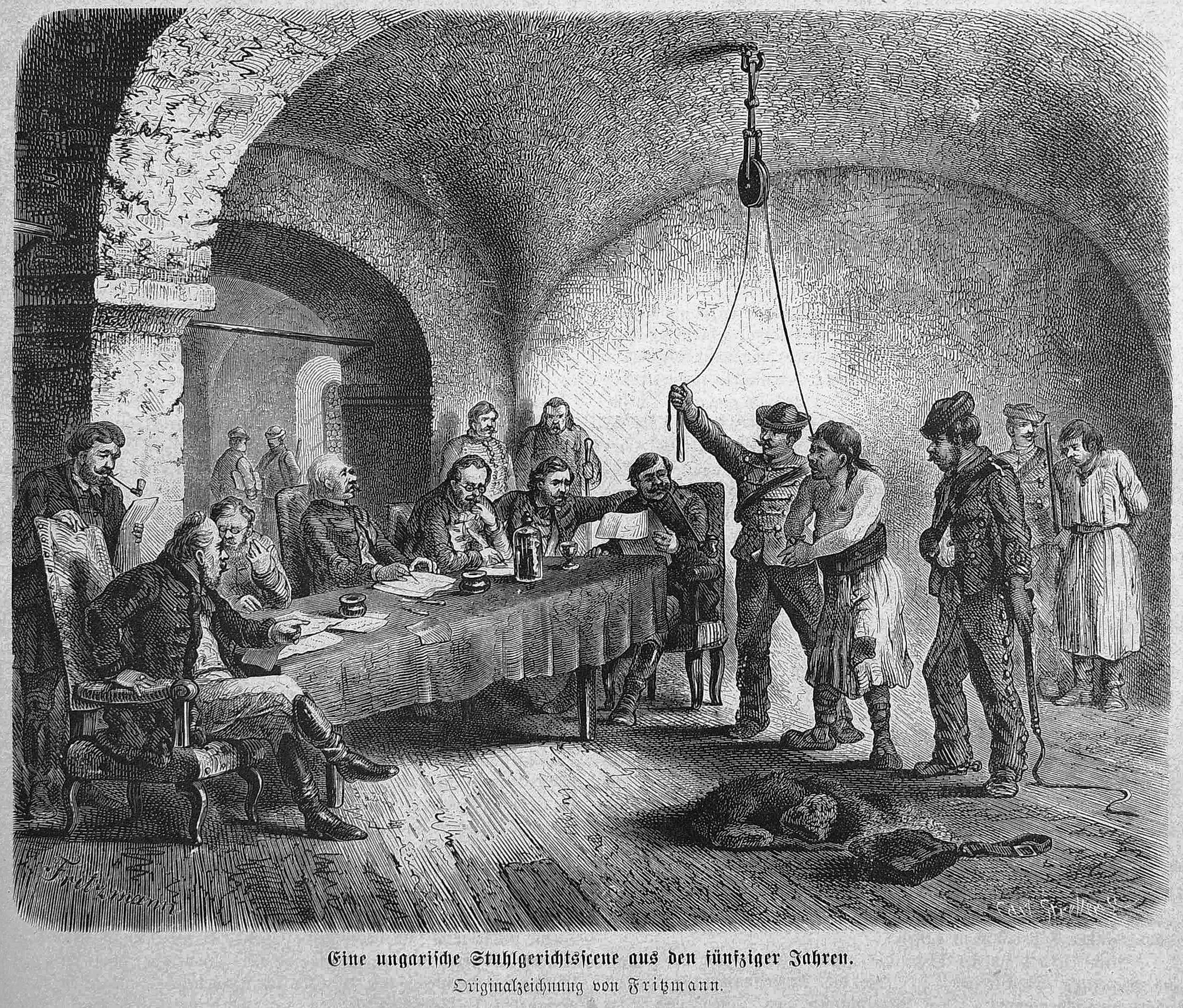
"Eine ungarische Stuhlgerichtsscene aus den fünfziger Jahren"; drawn by Fritzmann

The constitution of 2011 replaced that of 1949.

== Legislation ==
The legislature is the Magyar Országgyűlés (English: National Assembly). There was formerly a Diet of Hungary.

Legislation includes Acts (Hungarian: törvény or törvények).

=== List of legislation ===
- Golden Bull of 1222
- Golden Bull of 1242
- April Laws of 1848
- Regency Act (Act XIX of 1937)
- Defence Law (Act II of 1938)
- Act IV of 1947 on the abolition of certain titles and ranks
- Civil Code (Act IV of 1959)
- Government decree of 1971 on legal advisers
- Act IV of 1972 concerning the courts
- Act VII of 1972 on the planning of the national economy
- Act I of 1973 on criminal procedure
- Act I of 1974 on marriage, family, and guardianship
- Act II of 1976 on the protection of human environment
- Act I of 1977 on notifications and proposals of public interest, and on complaints
- Act VI of 1977 on state enterprises
- Act IV of 1978 on criminal code
- Act II of 1979 on public finances
- Law Decree No 13 of the 1979 on private international law
- Law III of 1952 on the Code of Civil Procedure.

== Courts and judiciary ==
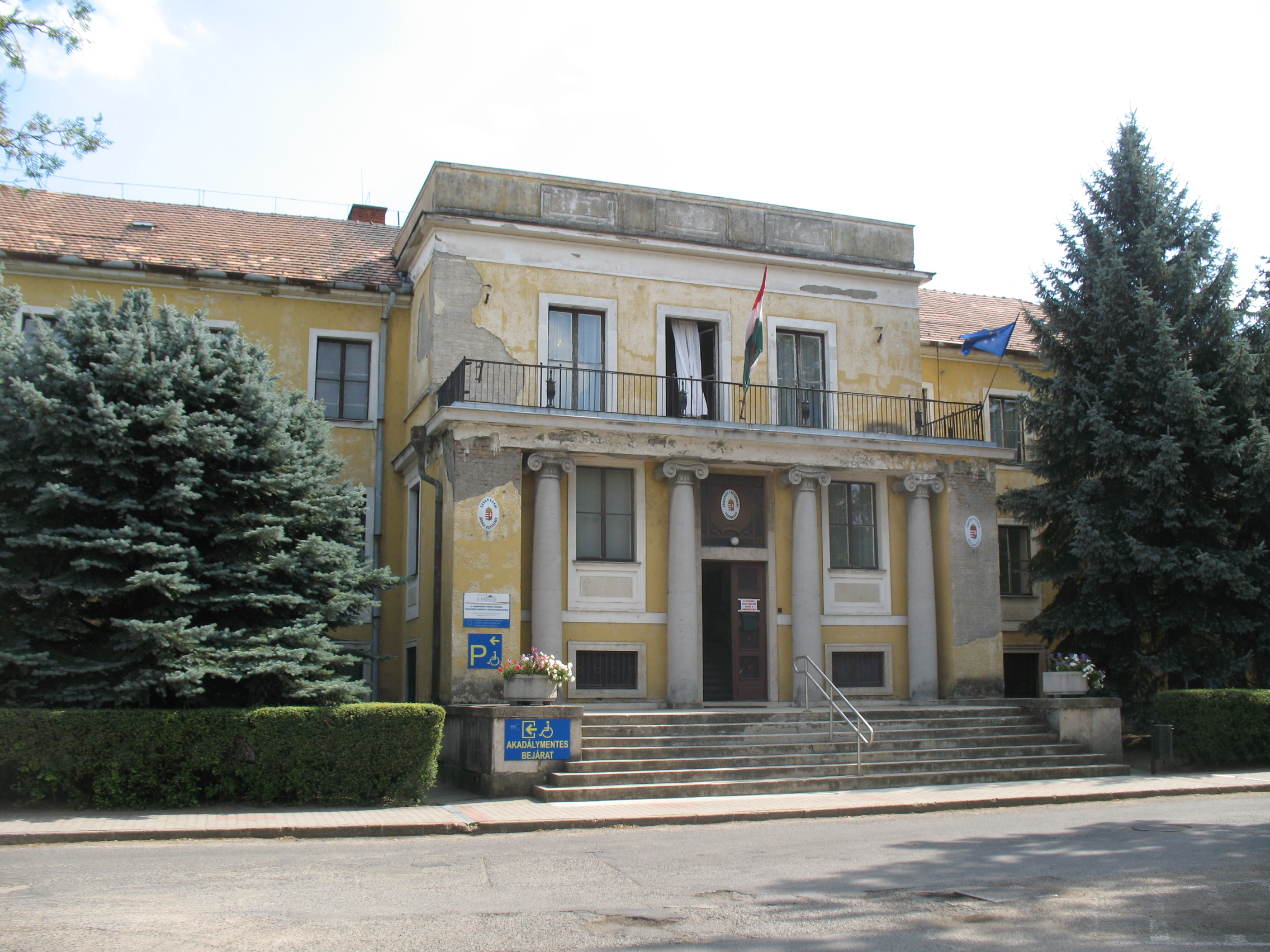
The Prosecutor's Office, Sárbogárd

There is a Supreme Court, a Constitutional Court and a Central District Court of Pest. There was a Chief Justice of Hungary.

== Legal practitioners ==
There is a Hungarian Bar Association (Hungarian: Magyar Ügyvédi Kamara). Legislation relating to legal practitioners includes Act XI of 1998.

== Criminal law ==
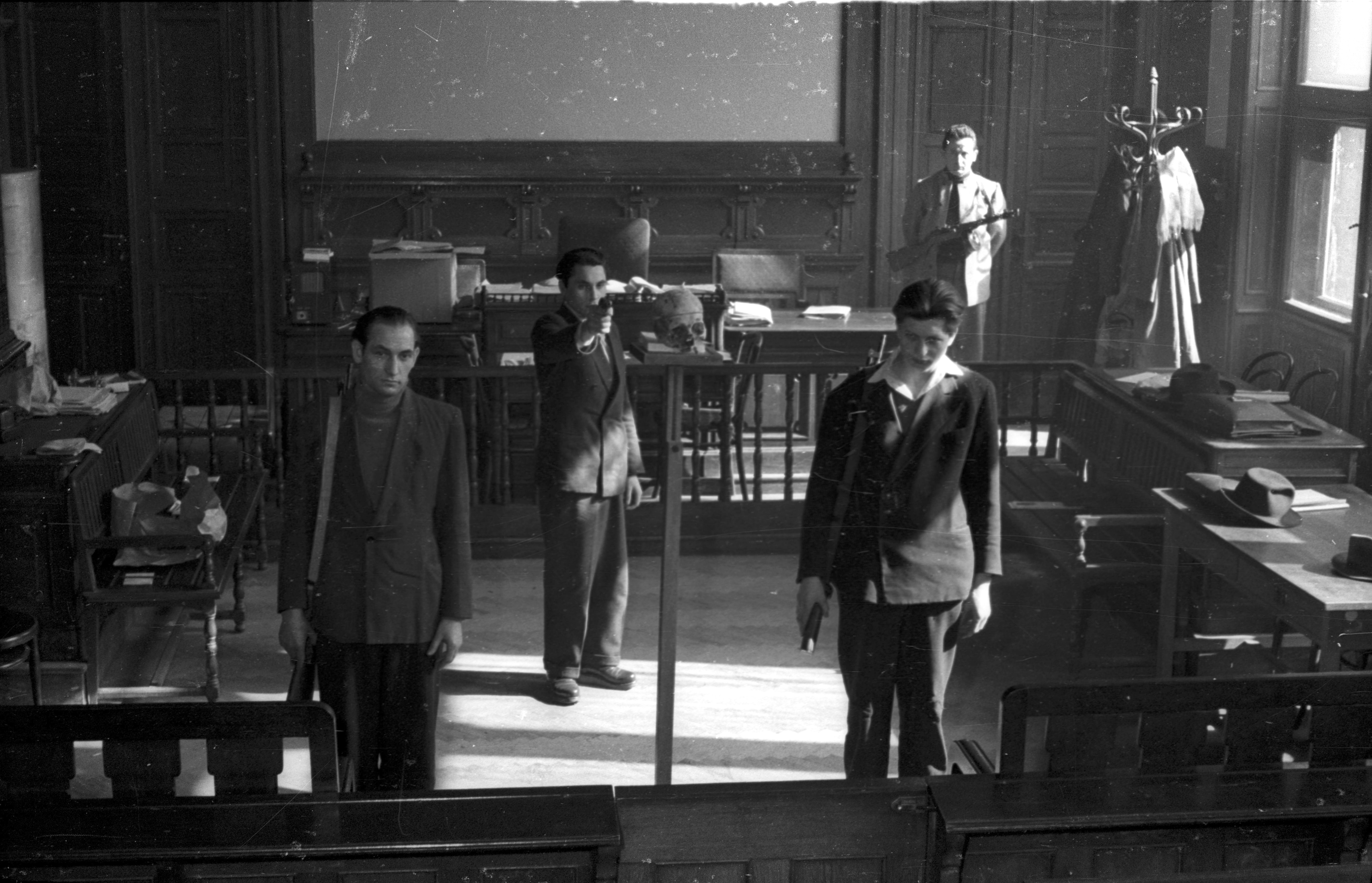
A trial in Budapest, 1958

The law of Hungary includes criminal law. Legislation on this subject has included Act IV of 1978 on criminal code.

Legislation on criminal procedure has included Act III of 1951, Act I of 1973 on criminal procedure and Act XIX of 1998.

The current Hungarian Criminal Code is the Act C of 2012 on Criminal Code, in force since 1st July 2013.

== Company law ==
The law of Hungary includes company law. Legislation on accounting has included Act C of 2000.

== Energy ==
The law of Hungary includes energy law. Legislation on electricity has included Act XLVIII of 1994.

== History ==
The royal prerogatives of the King of Hungary included prefection. Tripartitum was a law book.

== See also ==
- Hungarian nationality law
- Pocket contract
