= Alex Brenninkmeijer =

Dutch lawyer, judge, and academic (1951–2022)

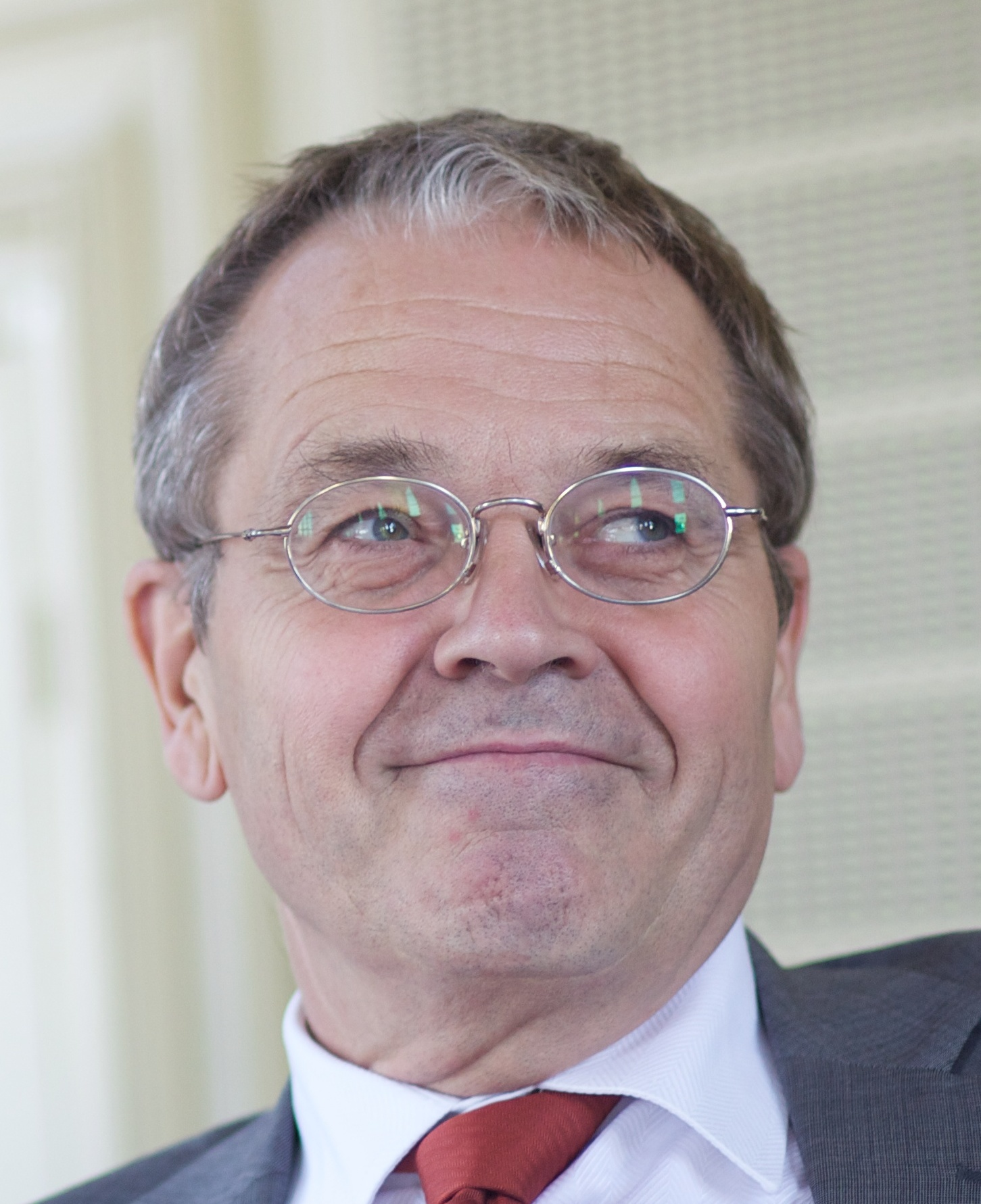
- Alex Brenninkmeijer in 2011

Member of the European Court of Auditors for the Netherlands
- In office 1 January 2014 – 14 April 2022
- President: Vítor Manuel da Silva Caldeira; Klaus-Heiner Lehne
- Preceded by: Gijs de Vries
- Succeeded by: Stef Blok

Personal details
- Born: Alex Franciscus Maria Brenninkmeijer; June 29, 1951 Amsterdam
- Died: April 14, 2022 (aged 70) Luxembourg
- Spouse: Sacha Prechal
- Occupation: Lawyer, judge and academic

Alex Brenninkmeijer (29 June 1951 - 14 April 2022) was a Dutch lawyer, judge and academic, national ombudsman between 2005 and 2014, and member of the European Court of Auditors from 2014 until his death.

== Biography ==
Alex Brenninkmeijer was born in Amsterdam in 1951. He studied Dutch law at the University of Groningen from 1971 to 1976, majoring in private law and public law and minoring in economics. In 1987, he obtained his doctorate from Tilburg University.

From 2005 to 2014, Brenninkmeijer served as the National Ombudsman of the Netherlands. He was a member of the ECA from 2014 until his death in April 2022.

Brenninkmeijer was married to judge Sacha Prechal.
