= Paul Joan George Kapteyn =

Dutch judge (born 1928)

Jos Kapteyn
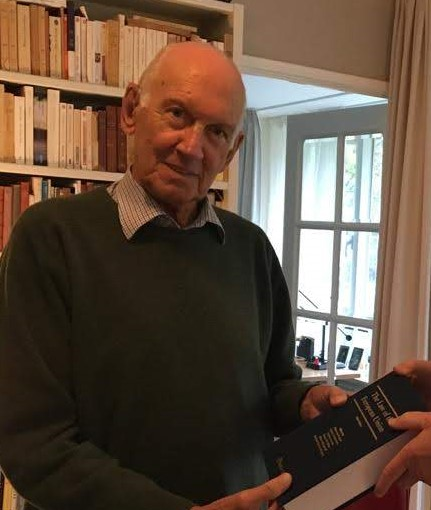
- Kapteyn in 2018

Judge of the European Court of Justice
- In office 1 January 1990 – 6 October 2000
- Preceded by: Thijmen Koopmans
- Succeeded by: Christiaan Timmermans

President of the Administrative Jurisdiction Division of the Council of State
- In office 1985–1989
- Preceded by: Maurits Troostwijk
- Succeeded by: Piet Boukema

Member of the Council of State of the Netherlands
- In office 29 November 1976 – 1 January 1990

Personal details
- Born: Paul Joan George Kapteyn; 31 January 1928 (age 98) Laren, Netherlands

Academic background
- Education: Leiden University (LLM, PhD)
- Thesis: De gemeenschappelijke vergadering van de EGKS 1952-1958. Een proeve in Europees Parlementarisme (1960)
- Doctoral advisor: Frederik Mari van Asbeck

Academic work
- Discipline: European Union law
- Institutions: Utrecht University; Leiden University

Paul Joan George (Jos) Kapteyn (born 31 January 1928) is a Dutch judge. He was a member of the Council of State of the Netherlands from 1976 to 1990 and subsequently served as judge at the European Court of Justice from 1990 until 2000.

== Biography ==
Kapteyn was born in Laren in 1928 as the son of M.J.P Schröder and Paul Kapteyn. His father would later become a Labour Party politician in the Dutch Senate and in the predecessors of the European Parliament. Kapteyn studied law at Leiden University. In 1946 he was present for the ceremony for the honorary doctorate of Winston Churchill and was part of the guard of honor. In 1950 Kapteyn earned a Master of Laws and in 1960 a Doctor of Law degree at Leiden University. His doctoral dissertation, titled De gemeenschappelijke vergadering van de EGKS 1952-1958. Een proeve in Europees Parlementarisme and supervised by Frederik Mari van Asbeck, was about the Common Assembly of the European Coal and Steel Community between 1952 and 1958, in which his father served during that period. He then pursued a career as an official in the Dutch Ministry of Foreign Affairs, serving between 1960 and 1963. Kapteyn was member of the municipal council of Oegstgeest from 4 September 1962 to 15 July 1964.

Kapteyn worked as a professor of Law of International Organisations at Utrecht University between 1963 and 1975, and then continued in the same position at Leiden University. He only worked shortly at Leiden University as he was appointed member of the Council of State of the Netherlands per 29 November 1976. Kapteyn was President of the Administrative Jurisdiction Division of the Council of State between 1985 and 1989, in which he was succeeded by Piet Boukema. He served in office as member until 1 January 1990. On that date he became involved in European law and became judge at the European Court of Justice (ECJ). He succeeded Thijmen Koopmans as the Dutch judge. As judge, Kapteyn argued against the six-year term for ECJ judges, stating that it takes a while to get up to speed, and proposed a longer single-term period. Kapteyn served until 6 October 2000 and was succeeded by Christiaan Timmermans. After his return to the Netherlands he served as professor of European Studies (Ynso Scholten professorship) at the University of Amsterdam between 2000 and 2005.

== Memberships ==
- Member of the American Society of International Law
- Member of the Administrative Council of the Hague Academy of International Law
- Member of the International Commission of Jurists
- Member of the Netherlands Association of International Law
- Member of the Royal Netherlands Academy of Arts and Sciences (1980)
