= Christiaan Timmermans =

Dutch law professor and judge (born 1941)

Judge of the European Court of Justice
- In office 7 October 2000 – 10 June 2010
- Preceded by: Paul Joan George Kapteyn
- Succeeded by: Sacha Prechal

Personal details
- Born: Christiaan Willem Anton Timmermans; 6 December 1941 (age 84) Rotterdam, Netherlands

Academic background
- Education: Sint Franciscuscollege, Rotterdam
- Alma mater: Leiden University (LLM, PhD)
- Thesis: De administratieve rechter en beoordelingsvrijheden van bestuursorganen: een rechtsvergelijkend onderzoek naar de controle van de administratieve rechter op de uitoefening van beoordelingsvrijheden van bestuursorganen in het nationale recht en het gemeenschapsrecht (1973)
- Doctoral advisor: Herman Hendrik Maas

Academic work
- Discipline: European Union law
- Institutions: University of Groningen

Christiaan Willem Anton Timmermans (born 6 December 1941) is a Dutch law professor and judge. He was a judge at the European Court of Justice between 2000 and 2010.

== Early life ==
Timmermans was born in 1941 in Rotterdam. From 1953 to 1959 he attended the Sint Francisucscollege in Rotterdam. From 1959 to 1966 he studied law at Leiden University and specialized in private law.

== Career ==
Timmermans pursued a career as law clerk in the European Court of Justice, working there between 1966 and 1969. He then worked as an official for the Commission of the European Communities between 1969 and 1977. In 1973 he obtained a Ph.D. in law at Leiden University; his doctoral thesis, titled De administratieve rechter en beoordelingsvrijheden van bestuursorganen: een rechtsvergelijkend onderzoek naar de controle van de administratieve rechter op de uitoefening van beoordelingsvrijheden van bestuursorganen in het nationale recht en het gemeenschapsrecht (The administrative judge and freedoms of assessment of administrative bodies: a comparative legal inquiry into the control of the administrative judge on the exercise of freedoms of assessment of administrative bodies in national law and Community law) was supervised by Herman Hendrik Maas. He subsequently worked as a professor of European Law at the University of Groningen between 1977 and 1989. Between 1989 and 2000 he was deputy director-general of the Legal Service at the European Commission. While in this position he wrote a handbook on European Union law together with Richard Lauwaars. In 1991 Timmermans was made foreign correspondent of the Royal Netherlands Academy of Arts and Sciences. From 1999 to 2003 he was a part time professor of European law at the University of Amsterdam.

On 7 October 2000 Timmermans was appointed as a judge of the European Court of Justice. He succeeded Paul Joan George Kapteyn as the Dutch judge. From 2003 to 2009 he served as president of a chamber of judges. Timmermans himself was succeeded as judge by Sacha Prechal on 10 June 2010 and she would sit out of the remainder of his term until 2012.

After his return to the Netherlands, Timmermans served as professor at the Law faculty (Pieter Sanders professorship) at the Erasmus University Rotterdam between 2010 and 2012. From 2016 until 2019, he also served on the Commission's Independent Ethical Committee.

== Other activities ==
- British Institute of International and Comparative Law, Member of the Advisory Council
- T.M.C. Asser Instituut, Member of the Advisory Council on International Law
- European Law Institute, Member of the Projects Committee
- Royal Netherlands Academy of Arts and Sciences, Foreign Correspondent
- European Anti-Fraud Office (OLAF), Member of the Supervisory Committee (2012–2015)
