= María Lourdes Arastey =

María Lourdes Arastey Sahún

Judge at the European Court of Justice
- In office 7 October 2021 – 6 October 2027
- Preceded by: Rosario Silva de Lapuerta

Personal details
- Born: July 26, 1959 (age 67) Tarragona, Spain
- Education: University of Barcelona
- Profession: Jurist, Legal scholar
- Known for: Judicial work

María Lourdes Arastey Sahún (born 29 July 1959) is a Spanish judge and legal scholar serving as a judge at the European Court of Justice (ECJ) since October 2021. She is the first career judge from Spain to be appointed to this position. She currently presides over the Fifth Chamber of the ECJ.

== Early life and education ==
Arastey was born in Tarragona, Spain, in 1959. She got her law degree from the University of Barcelona in 1982 and entered the Spanish judiciary in 1984 after completing her training at the Escuela Judicial Judicial College of Spain.

== See also ==
- Ben Smulders
