= Richard Lauwaars =

Dutch jurist (born 1940)

Member of the Council of State
- In office 1 February 1994 – 1 September 2005

Personal details
- Born: Richard Hubertus Lauwaars; 10 August 1940 (age 86) Rotterdam

Academic background
- Education: Leiden University (LLM, PhD)
- Thesis: Rechtmatigheid en rechtskracht van gemeenschapsbesluiten: enige beschouwingen over de bindende besluiten die de Raad en de Commissie van de Europese Gemeenschappen kunnen nemen krachtens het Verdrag tot oprichting van de Europese Economische Gemeenschap (1970)
- Doctoral advisor: Herman Hendrik Maas
- Other advisor: Ivo Samkalden

Academic work
- Discipline: European Union law
- Institutions: Vrije Universiteit Amsterdam; University of Amsterdam
- Doctoral students: Sacha Prechal
- Notable works: Europees Gemeenschapsrecht in kort bestek (with Christiaan Timmermans)

Richard Hubertus Lauwaars (born 10 August 1940) is a Dutch jurist. He was a professor of law of European organizations at Vrije Universiteit Amsterdam from 1972 and 1979. He subsequently was professor of law of international organizations at the University of Amsterdam from 1980 to 1994. Lauwaars then was member of the Council of State between 1994 and 2008, serving the last three years in extraordinary service.

== Life and career ==
Lauwaars was born on 10 August 1940 in Rotterdam. He went to study Dutch law at Leiden University and in 1963 obtained his degree. Lauwaars continued his studies at Leiden University and in 1970 obtained his PhD in law with a thesis titled: "Rechtmatigheid en rechtskracht van gemeenschapsbesluiten: enige beschouwingen over de bindende besluiten die de Raad en de Commissie van de Europese Gemeenschappen kunnen nemen krachtens het Verdrag tot oprichting van de Europese Economische Gemeenschap". The thesis was originally supervised by Ivo Samkalden until his appointment as minister of Justice in 1965, and subsequently by Herman Hendrik Maas. From 1972 to 1979 Lauwaars was a professor of law of European Institutions at the Vrije Universiteit Amsterdam. He spent the next academic year as visiting professor at the University of Michigan Law School. From 1980 to 1994 he was a professor of law of international organizations at the University of Amsterdam, succeeding Henry G. Schermers. From 1981 to 1983 he was director of its Europa Institute. He served as promotor of Sacha Prechal. In 1989, together with Johan de Vree and Peter Coffey he was editors of the book Towards a European Foreign Policy: Legal, Economic and Political Dimensions. Records of a Colloquium held by the Europa Institute of the University of Amsterdam on the Occasion of its 25th Anniversary.

Lauwaars became member of the Council of State on 1 February 1994. While in this position, he opposed a Dutch referendum on a European Constitution in September 2003 and was the only member of the council to do so. In 2005 Lauwaars was featured in article by de Volkskrant on how the role between government and citizens was changing. He served as member in the council until 1 September 2005. He served as staatsraad in extraordinary service between 1 September 2005 and 1 September 2008.

From 1983 to 2011 he was an editorial member of the SEW, Tijdschrift voor Europees en economisch recht. Together with Christiaan Timmermans he wrote a handbook on European Union law, titled Europees Gemeenschapsrecht in kort bestek. Lauwaars was elected a member of the Royal Netherlands Academy of Arts and Sciences in 1994.
