= Károly Csemegi =

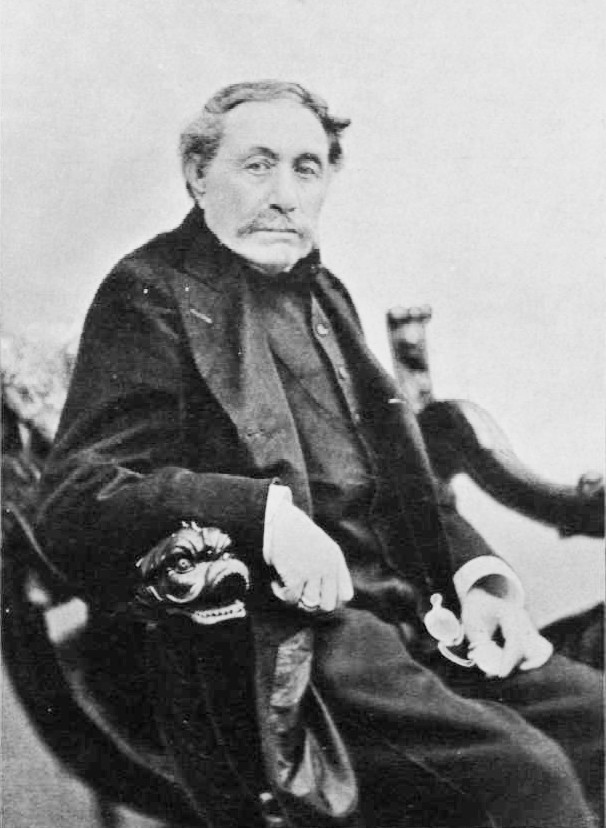
- Born: May 3, 1826; Csongrád, (Kingdom of Hungary (1526–1867))
- Died: March 18, 1899 (aged 72); Budapest, (Austria-Hungary)
- Spouse: Franciska Fischer
- Children: Ákos

Károly Csemegi (1826–1899) was a Hungarian judge who was instrumental in the creation of the first criminal code of Hungary. Though born Jewish, he later converted to Christianity.

After serving as a major and commanding troops in the unsuccessful Hungarian Revolution of 1848, he worked as an advocate in the countryside. Following the Austro-Hungarian Compromise of 1867, Csemegi became a high official in the new Hungarian Ministry of Justice, in which capacity he drafted the 1878 Criminal Code as well as the Code of Criminal Procedure. Soon after, he was appointed to the post of Presiding Judge of the Hungarian Supreme Court. Csemegi was also the founder and first president of the Hungarian Jurists' Association.
