= Statute XIX of 1937 =

The Statute XIX of 1937 regarding establishing of a National Council when the Regent seat is vacant was a 1937 law of the Kingdom of Hungary. The National Council (Országtanács) would be an interim collective head of state.

== Members of the National Council ==
- Prime Minister of Hungary
- Speaker of the House of Magnates
- Speaker of the House of Representatives
- Archbishop
- President of the Curia Regia ("Supreme Court")
- President of the Administrative Court
- Supreme Commander of the Hungarian Royal Army

== Background ==
The National Council was instituted because of Regent Miklós Horthy's old age and illness. The situation was further complicated as the position of Regent was inherently temporary under constitutional law and thus there was no provision for its vacancy. The transfer of the function, the issues of succession, inheritance, and surface have brought the matter on behalf of the legitimists the accusation of dynasty-founding.

After the Arrow Cross Party's coup and the resignation of Horthy on October 16, 1944 Ferenc Szálasi was appointed "Leader of the Nation". He established a Regent Council of three members, all from the Hungarian Nazi party. After the Soviet occupation of Hungary a High National Council formed in 1945 which was the collective head of state until the declaration of the Second Hungarian Republic. Members of the first High National Council were Béla Zsedényi (Speaker of the Interim National Assembly), Béla Miklós (Prime Minister) and Ernő Gerő (from the Hungarian Communist Party, later replaced by József Révai, then by Mátyás Rákosi). But the real power was in the hands of the Allied Control Commission, led by Kliment Voroshilov.
