= Piet Boukema =

Dutch politician and jurist

Pieter Jan (Piet) Boukema (19 July 1933, Veur – 15 October 2007, Amstelveen) was a Dutch jurist and politician. He was a member of the Provinciale Staten of North Holland from 1966 to 1970, of the Senate of the Netherlands from 1970 to 1976 and of the Raad van State from 1976 to 2000.
