= Thijmen Koopmans =

Dutch judge and academic

Judge of the Supreme Court of the Netherlands
- In office 1978–1979

Judge of the European Court of Justice
- In office 29 March 1979 – 29 March 1990
- Preceded by: André Donner
- Succeeded by: Paul Joan George Kapteyn

Personal details
- Born: 11 August 1929 Amsterdam, Netherlands
- Died: 24 December 2015 (aged 86) Voorburg, Netherlands

Academic background
- Education: University of Amsterdam (LLM, PhD)
- Thesis: De begrippen werkman, arbeider en werknemer (1962)
- Doctoral advisor: Marius Levenbach

Academic work
- Discipline: Labour law, constitutional law, European Union law
- Institutions: Leiden University

Thijmen (Tim) Koopmans (11 August 1929 – 24 December 2015) was a Dutch judge and prominent academic. He was a judge of the Supreme Court of the Netherlands and the European Court of Justice.

== Biography ==
Koopmans was born on 11 August 1929 in Amsterdam. In 1953 he earned a Doctor of Law degree at the University of Amsterdam. He then pursued a career as advocate and procurator in Haarlem. In 1956 he started at the Ministry of Justice of the Netherlands, he stayed there until 1962. He made his first move into European law when he joined the legal department of the Council of the European Communities, he stayed there until 1965. He returned to the Netherlands where he became a full professor at Leiden University, working in that position between 1965 and 1978. Between 1973 and 1975 he also served as dean of the faculty of law. In 1978 Koopmans was made member of the Royal Netherlands Academy of Arts and Sciences. Between 1978 and 1979 he served as a judge in the Supreme Court of the Netherlands. He then moved once more to European law as he served as judge in the European Court of Justice until 1990. In 2009 he was part of the Commissie Davids, the commission wrote a report on the political support of the Netherlands for the Iraq War.

Koopmans died on 24 December 2015 in Voorburg.
