= Pocket contract =

A pocket contract is a land-purchase deal that abuses a loophole in the legal restrictions regulating land deals.

The term is mostly used in Hungary. Until May 2014, Hungarian laws did not allow foreigners to purchase Hungarian land. The term originally referred to land deals that omitted the date of the purchase, and the contract was kept ‘in the pocket’ until the land law is changed. The term is now used in a more general sense, and it refers to any contract that aims to circumvent the land laws for the purpose of land grabbing.

The Győr-Moson Sopron County Agricultural Chamber has identified over 16 different types of ‘pocket contract’ over the last decade (some of them have since been excluded due to changes in the Land Tenure Act).

== Legal action ==
In February 2014, the Hungarian parliament approved a modified law on pocket contracts, which sought to make action taken by the authorities against the invalid ownership and misuse of farmland in Hungary more effective.

In May 2014, under an obligation undertaken in its EU accession agreement, Hungary lifted the ban for foreigners on purchasing Hungarian land. However, the country's new land act ensures the possibility of purchasing land practically only to Hungarian farmers. Therefore, many foreigners that purchased Hungarian land in pocket contracts, tried to sell them to Hungarian customers.
