= 2022 Hungarian anti-LGBTQ referendum =

Referendum in Hungary

2022 Hungarian referendum
- 3 April 2022
- 1. Do you support holding information events on sexual orientation to minors, in public education institutions without parental consent?; 2. Do you support the promotion of gender-reassignment treatments to minors?; 3. Do you support the unrestricted exposure of minors to sexually explicit media content, that may influence their development?; 4. Do you support showing minors media content on gender changing procedures?
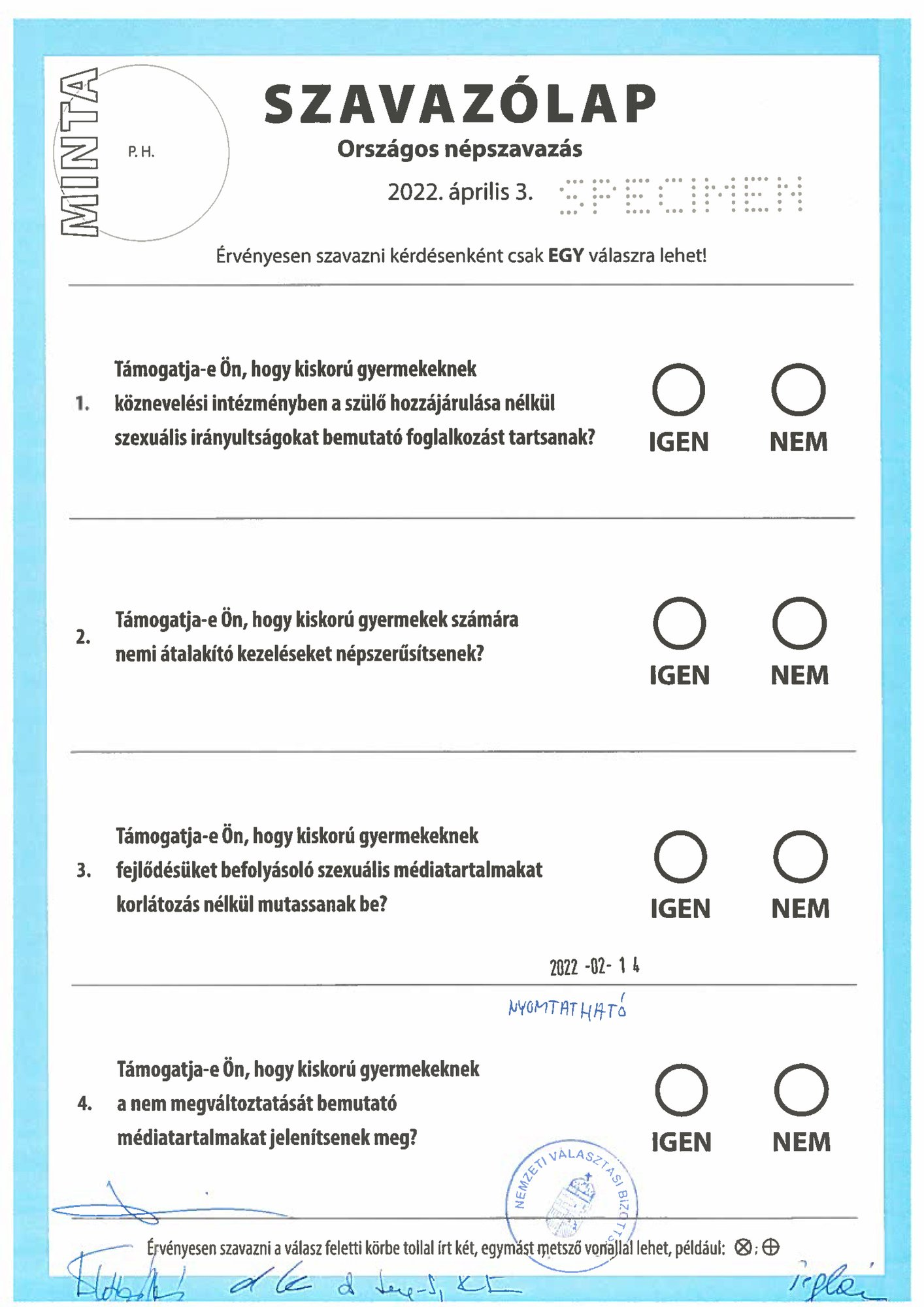
- Referendum ballot

A referendum was held in Hungary on 3 April 2022, coinciding with the parliamentary elections. While the overwhelming majority of valid votes were cast as "no" to the four referendum questions, the share of valid votes was below the 50% required for the result to be considered valid and thus the referendum was rejected.

== Background ==
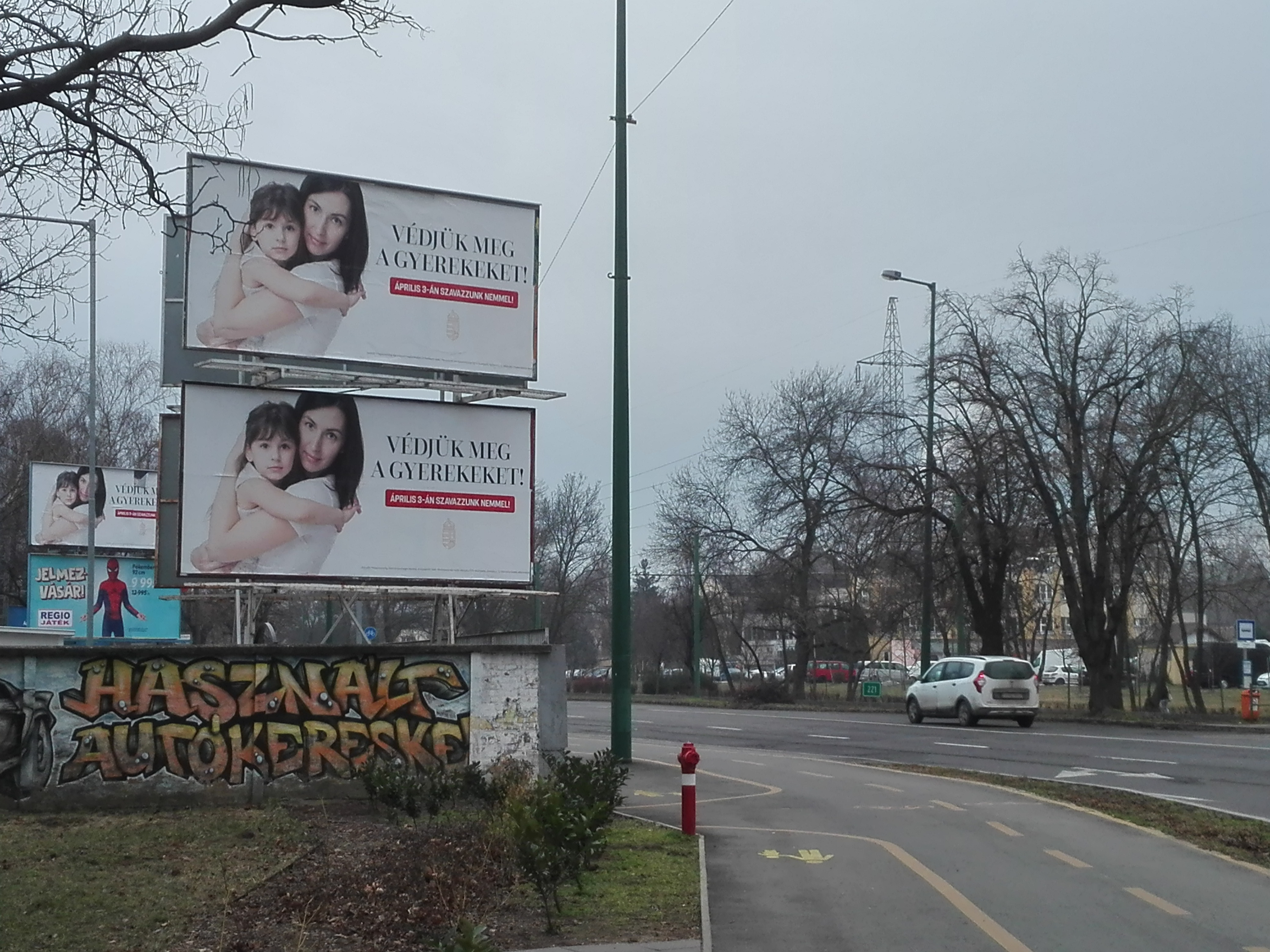
Government campaign posters for the referendum

The referendum was called by Fidesz, the ruling party of the Hungarian government, and was described as child protection issues concerning LGBTQ rights in the country after pressure from the European Union (EU) over legislation which the EU states discriminates against LGBTQ people.

The law has been described as appearing to "conflate [and equate] homosexuality and paedophilia, and is modelled partly on a Russian law that banned so-called "gay propaganda" among minors. The Hungarian law goes further, making it an offence to "promote or portray" homosexuality or gender reassignment to minors. It also limits sex education in schools to government-approved organisations".

In a statement released by the Office of the President of the Republic, János Áder said (the statement in full): "Hungary's National Assembly voted unanimously on November 9, 2021 to hold a referendum on the day of the general election. "The legal conditions for holding a referendum are in place for four questions on which referendums have been initiated. "Taking into consideration the deadlines set by the laws on electoral and referendum procedures, a referendum on the four issues in question and the general election can only be held simultaneously on April 3 or April 10. "In view of this, I have set the referendum on the four issues specified in Parliamentary Resolution 32/2021 of November 30 for April 3, 2022."

Opposition politicians abstained from voting on the resolution.

== Referendum questions ==
The four questions were:

Hungarian text	English translation
Támogatja-e Ön, hogy kiskorú gyermekeknek köznevelési intézményben a szülő hozzájárulása nélkül szexuális irányultságokat bemutató foglalkozást tartsanak?	Do you support holding information events on sexual orientation to minors in public education institutions without parental consent?
Támogatja-e Ön, hogy kiskorú gyermekek számára nemi átalakító kezeléseket népszerűsítsenek?	Do you support the promotion of gender reassignment treatments to minors?
Támogatja-e Ön, hogy kiskorú gyermekeknek fejlődésüket befolyásoló szexuális médiatartalmakat korlátozás nélkül mutassanak be?	Do you support the unrestricted exposure of minors to sexually explicit media content that may influence their development?
Támogatja-e Ön, hogy kiskorú gyermekeknek a nem megváltoztatását bemutató médiatartalmakat jelenítsenek meg?	Do you support showing minors media content on gender changing procedures?

Some of the referendum questions were phrased as leading or loaded. Eleven NGOs have criticized the questions as deliberately manipulative, hateful, and violating the dignity of LGBTQ people.

== Criticism ==
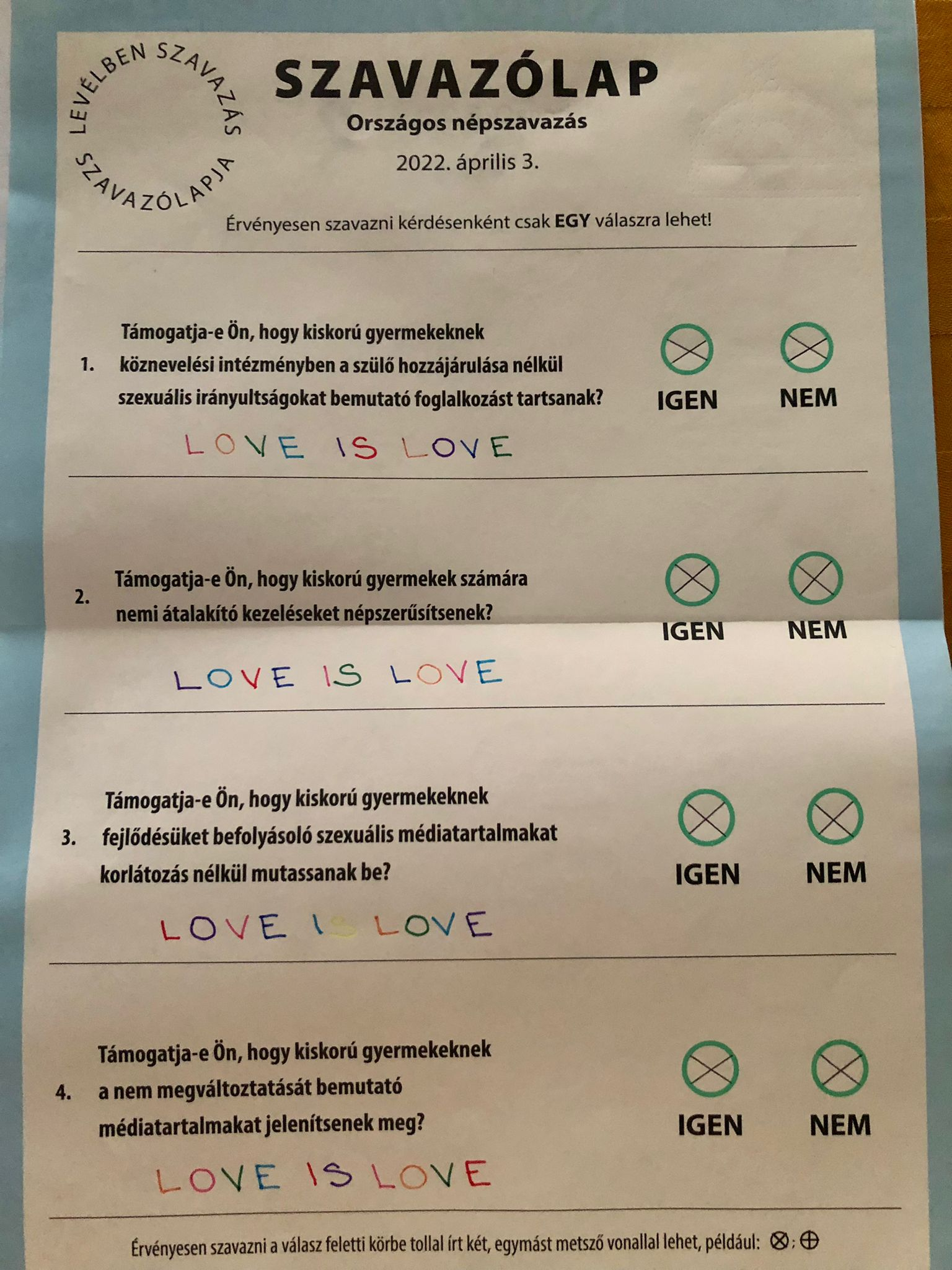
A protest vote to make the ballot invalid

The parts of the law that are in question in the referendum have been condemned by human rights groups and labelled as "vigorous anti-LGBT rhetoric" and "intended to limit minority rights". Human rights groups have also said the referendum is likely to increase discrimination and stigmatisation of Hungary's LGBTQ community, and make life more difficult for LGBTQ children.

The proposals have been widely criticised by the EU due to contravening Article 21 of the EU Charter of Fundamental Rights. This article states "stigmatizing LGBTQI persons constitute a clear breach of their fundamental right to dignity, as provided for in the EU Charter and international law." EU Commission president, Ursula von der Leyen, has described the bill as discriminatory and "a shame".

Luca Dudits, executive board member of the Háttér Society, the largest and oldest LGBTQ organisation in Hungary, said this referendum is "another tool of Viktor Orbán's communication campaign." She told Euronews, "If you want to pass a controversial law, you should win a referendum before that".

A joint statement from 10 Hungarian LGBTQ and human rights groups including Budapest Pride and Amnesty International Hungary called for citizens to give invalid answers to the referendum, circling both "yes" and "no" for every question to "help ensure that the government's exclusionary referendum does not reach the validity threshold."

== Results ==
=== Turnout ===
Turnout
7:00	9:00	11:00	13:00	15:00	17:00	18:30	Overall
1.79%	10.17%	25.46%	39.55%	52.18%	62.23%	67.06%	69.24%

=== Results ===
Question 1

"No" vote share as a percentage of registered voters

Invalid and "Yes" vote share as a percentage of registered voters

Question 2

"No" vote share as a percentage of registered voters

Invalid and "Yes" vote share as a percentage of registered voters

Question 3

"No" vote share as a percentage of registered voters

Invalid and "Yes" vote share as a percentage of registered voters

Question 4

"No" vote share as a percentage of registered voters

Invalid and "Yes" vote share as a percentage of registered voters

Question	For		Against		Valid votes		Invalid/ blank		Total votes	Registered voters	Turnout	Outcome
Question	Votes	%	Votes	%	Votes	%	Votes	%	Total votes	Registered voters	Turnout	Outcome
1	300,282	7.68	3,610,154	92.32	3,910,436	47.60	1,717,702	20.91	5,628,138	8,215,304	68.51	Rejected
2	158,447	4.08	3,721,934	95.92	3,880,381	47.23	1,747,757	21.27	5,628,138	8,215,304	68.51	Rejected
3	180,785	4.67	3,691,376	95.33	3,872,161	47.13	1,755,977	21.37	5,628,138	8,215,304	68.51	Rejected
4	186,938	4.83	3,683,104	95.17	3,870,042	47.11	1,758,096	21.40	5,628,138	8,215,304	68.51	Rejected

None of the questions reached the required threshold of 50% of registered voters casting a valid "yes" or "no" vote (4,107,652) in order for the referendum to be declared valid and binding.

== Aftermath ==
Following the referendum, the Hungarian National Election Committee fined 16 civil society organisations, including Amnesty International, the Háttér Society, and the Hungarian Civil Liberties Union, for having campaigned against the referendum. Amnesty International stated that the fines were an attempt "to silence us because our campaign and civil collaboration was successful." Later, the organizations challenged the decision at the Curia of Hungary, and the court ruled in their favour.

== See also ==
- Anti-LGBT curriculum laws in the United States
- Censorship of LGBT issues
- Education and the LGBT community
- LGBT rights in Hungary
- LGBT rights in the European Union
- LGBT sex education
