= Audiovisual Media Services Directive 2010 =

The Audiovisual Media Services Directive 2010 (2010/13/EU) is an EU law directive that governs the coordination of national legislation on all audiovisual media, including traditional television broadcasting and on-demand services. It establishes standards for editorial responsibility, prohibits incitement to hatred, and requires increased accessibility for persons with disabilities. In 2023, the European Commission proposed significant amendments to the directive through a new "Media Freedom Act."

== Contents ==
Article 1(1)(a) defines "audiovisual media services" as those devoted to providing programmes, under the editorial responsibility of a media service provider, to the general public by electronic communications networks in order to inform, entertain, or educate, whether on television or via an "on-demand" service. An "on-demand" service involves the viewing of programmes at a moment chosen by the user and at their individual request, based on a catalogue of programmes selected by the media service provider. This includes "editorial responsibility" under Article 1(1)(c).

Article 6 says Member states must ensure audiovisual services "do not contain any incitement to hatred" based on race, sex, religion, nationality or other protected characteristics.

Article 7 requires services are made "more accessible to persons with disabilities".

Article 9 prohibits media with "surreptitious" communication or "subliminal" techniques, to "prejudice respect for human dignity", that would "promote any discrimination", prejudice health and safety or "encourage behaviour grossly prejudicial to the protection of the environment".

Article 28b requires that video-sharing platform providers protect (a) minors from content that "may impair their physical, mental or moral development", (b) the general public from content "containing incitement to violence or hatred", and (c) the general public from content whose dissemination is criminal in EU law, such as terrorism, child pornography or offences concerning racism or xenophobia.

== Proposed amendments, 2023 ==
The EU Commission proposed amending the Directive with a new "Media Freedom Act". This proposed a new European Board for Media Services with coordination and opinion giving powers, composed of member state regulator representatives.

== See also ==
- EU law
