= Ben Smulders =

Dutch jurist

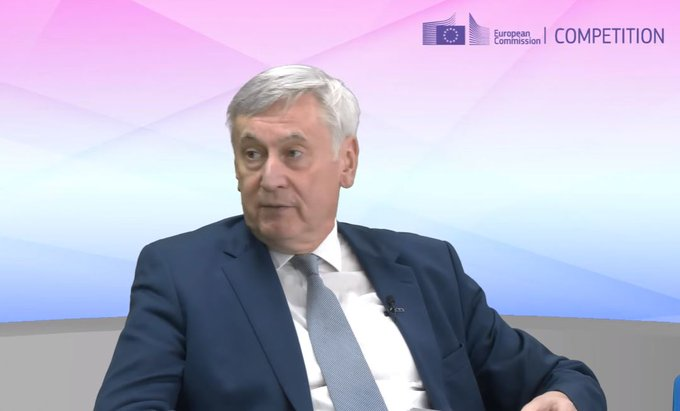
- Smulders in 2024

Judge at the European Court of Justice
- Incumbent
- Assumed office 7 October 2024
- Preceded by: Sacha Prechal

Personal details
- Born: Bernardus Maria Polycarpus Smulders; 25 June 1960 (age 66) The Hague
- Education: Leiden University (LLM); London School of Economics (LLM)

Bernardus Maria Polycarpus Smulders (born 25 June 1960) is a Dutch jurist who is currently a judge at the European Court of Justice. He is recognized for his work in the European Union law, particularly in the field of competition law and regulatory policy.

Smulders studied law at Leiden University, graduating in 1983; he obtained a Master of Laws degree at the London School of Economics in 1984. He was admitted to the bar in 1985 and practiced law in the firm NautaDutilh from 1985 to 1990. In 1991 he joined the Legal Service of the European Commission, working in the teams on internal market law and competition and state aid. From 1995 to 2000 he was a member of the cabinet of Dutch commissioners Hans van den Broek and Frits Bolkestein and then of president of the European Commission Romano Prodi until 2004. From 2004 to 2008 he was chef de cabinet of Dutch commissioner Neelie Kroes, in charge of competition policy. From 2008 to 2014 he again served in the legal service as director and principal legal adviser for institutional law; in 2014 he became chef de cabinet of first vice president Frans Timmermans. In 2019 he returned to the legal service as director and principal legal adviser for trade law, and in 2022 he became deputy director general at the Directorate-General for Competition, in charge of EU state aid policy.

From 2007 Smulders served as visiting professor in EU law at the Brussels School of Governance of the Vrije Universiteit Brussel and the College of Europe in Bruges. He was also from 2008 to 2024 an editor of the Common Market Law Review.

On 12 April 2024 the Dutch government nominated Smulders to succeed Sacha Prechal as judge of the European Court of Justice starting 7 October of that year, after its previous nominee Herke Kranenborg had withdrawn his candidacy.
