= Outline of Hungary =

Country in the Carpathian Basin of Central Europe

The Flag of Hungary

The Coat of arms of Hungary

The location of Hungary

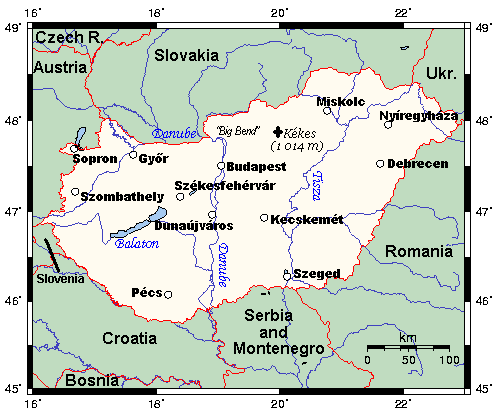
An enlargeable map of the Republic of Hungary

The following outline is provided as an overview of and topical guide to Hungary:

Hungary – landlocked sovereign country located in the Carpathian Basin of Central Europe, bordering Austria, Slovakia, Ukraine, Romania, Serbia, Croatia, and Slovenia. Its capital is Budapest. Hungary is a member of OECD, NATO, EU and a Schengen state. The official language is Hungarian (also known as Magyar), which forms part of the Uralic family. It is one of the four official languages of the European Union that is not of Indo-European origin.

Following a Celtic (after c. 450 BC) and a Roman (9 BC - c. 4th century) period, the foundation of Hungary was laid in the late Ninth Century by the Magyar chieftain Árpád, whose great-grandson István ascended to the throne with a crown sent from Rome in 1000. The Kingdom of Hungary existed with minor interruptions for more than 900 years, and at various points was regarded as one of the cultural centers of the Western world. It was succeeded by a Communist era (1947–1989) during which Hungary gained widespread international attention regarding the Revolution of 1956 and the seminal move of opening its border with Austria in 1989, thus accelerating the collapse of the Eastern Bloc. The present form of government is a parliamentary republic (since 1989). Hungary's current goal is to become a developed country by International Monetary Fund standards, having become already developed by most traditional measures, including GDP and HDI (world ranking 36th and rising). The country's first ever term of EU presidency is due in 2011.

Hungary was one of the 15 most popular tourist destinations in the world in the past decade, with a capital regarded as one of the most beautiful in the world. Despite its relatively small size, the country is home to numerous World Heritage Sites, UNESCO Biosphere reserves, the second largest thermal lake in the world (Lake Hévíz), the largest lake in Central Europe (Lake Balaton), and the largest natural grassland in Europe (Hortobágy National Park).

== General reference ==
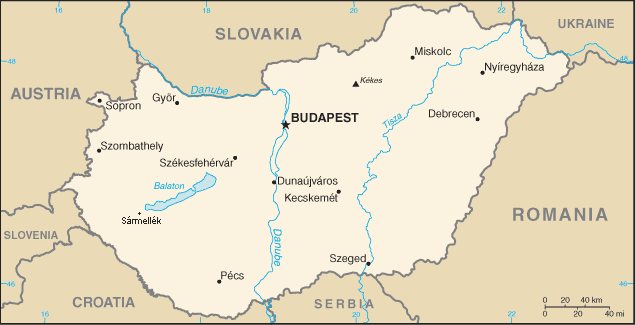
An enlargeable basic map of Hungary

- Pronunciation: /ˈhʌŋɡəri/
- Common English country name: Hungary
- Official English country name: Hungary
- Common endonym: Magyarország
- Official endonym: Magyarország
- Adjectives & demonymic: Hungarian, Magyar
- Etymology: Name of Hungary
- International rankings of Hungary
- ISO country codes: HU, HUN, 348
- ISO region codes: See ISO 3166-2:HU
- Internet country code top-level domain: .hu

== Geography of Hungary ==
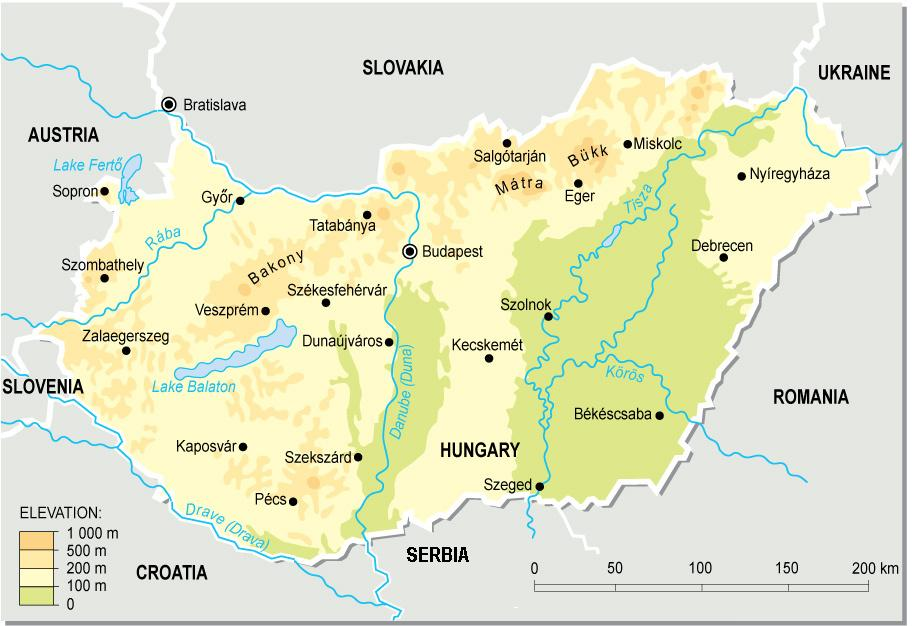
An enlargeable topographic map of Hungary

Geography of Hungary

- Hungary is: a landlocked country
- Location:
  - Northern Hemisphere and Eastern Hemisphere
  - Eurasia
    - Europe
      - Central Europe
  - Time zone: Central European Time (UTC+01), Central European Summer Time (UTC+02)
  - Extreme points of Hungary
    - High: Kékes 1,014 m (3,327 ft)
    - Low: Tisza (south of Szeged) 76 m (249 ft)
  - Land boundaries: 2,185 km

Slovakia 676 km
Romania 443 km
Austria 366 km
Croatia 329 km
Serbia 166 km
Ukraine 103 km
Slovenia 102 km

- Coastline: none

- Population of Hungary: 10,035,000 (June 30, 2008) - 80th most populous country
- Area of Hungary: 93,030 km^{2}
- Atlas of Hungary

=== Environment of Hungary ===
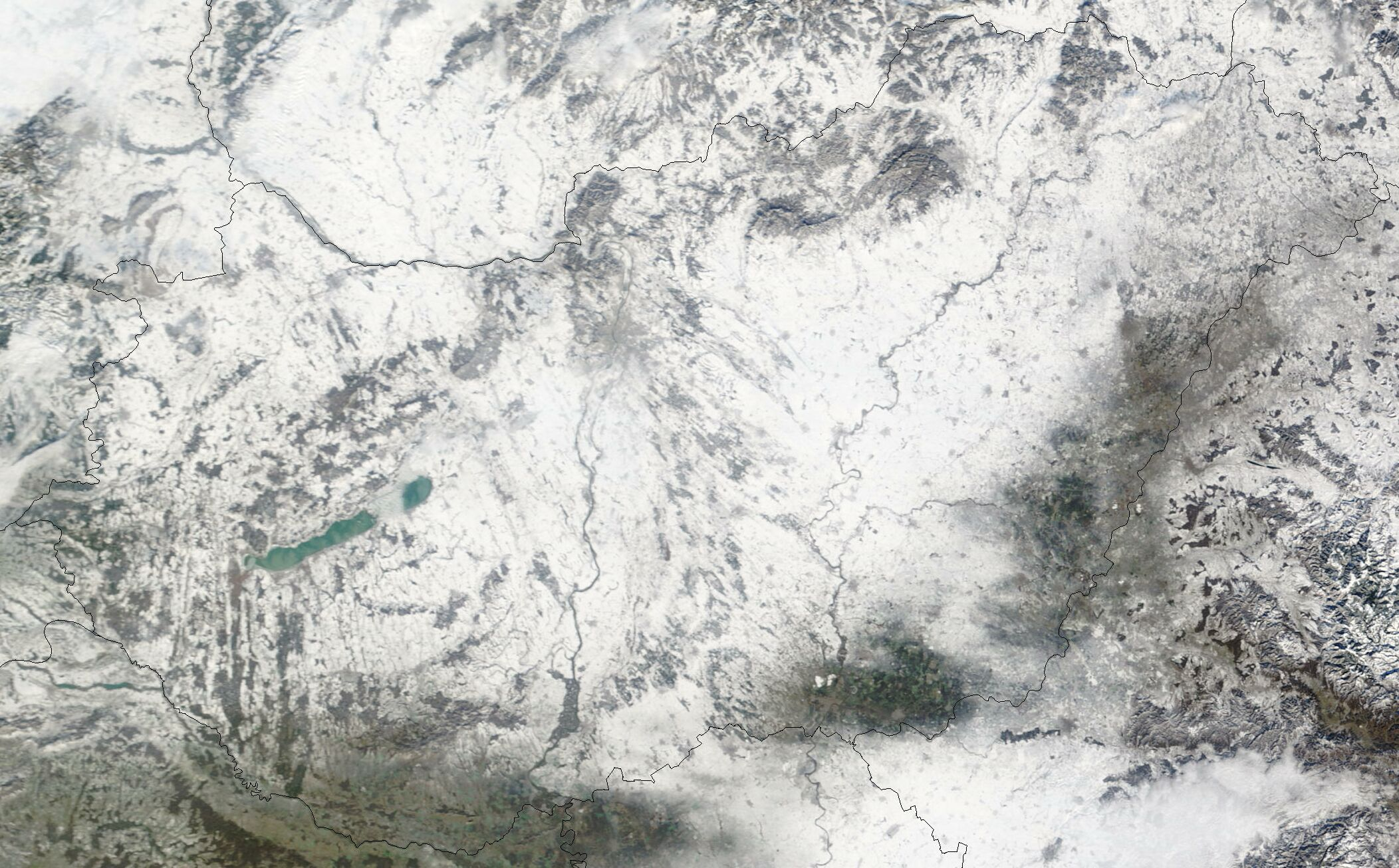
An enlargeable satellite image of Hungary

- Climate of Hungary
- Renewable energy in Hungary
- Geology of Hungary
- Protected areas of Hungary
  - Biosphere reserves in Hungary
  - National parks of Hungary
- Wildlife of Hungary
  - Fauna of Hungary
    - Birds of Hungary
    - Mammals of Hungary

==== Natural geographic features of Hungary ====
- Glaciers of Hungary
- Islands of Hungary
- Lakes of Hungary
- Mountains of Hungary
  - Volcanoes in Hungary
- Rivers of Hungary
  - Waterfalls of Hungary
- Valleys of Hungary
- World Heritage Sites in Hungary

=== Regions of Hungary ===
==== Ecoregions of Hungary ====
List of ecoregions in Hungary

==== Administrative divisions of Hungary ====
- Counties of Hungary
  - Subregions of Hungary
    - Municipalities of Hungary

===== Counties of Hungary =====
Counties of Hungary

===== Subregions of Hungary =====
Subregions of Hungary

===== Municipalities of Hungary =====
Municipalities of Hungary

- Capital of Hungary: Budapest
- Cities of Hungary

=== Demography of Hungary ===
Demographics of Hungary

== Government and politics of Hungary ==
Politics of Hungary

- Form of government: parliamentary representative democratic republic
- Capital of Hungary: Budapest
- Elections in Hungary
- Political parties in Hungary

=== Branches of the government of Hungary ===
Government of Hungary

==== Executive branch of the government of Hungary ====
- Head of state: President of Hungary, Tamás Sulyok
- Head of government: Prime Minister of Hungary, Viktor Orbán
- Cabinet of Hungary

==== Legislative branch of the government of Hungary ====
- National Assembly of Hungary (unicameral)

==== Judicial branch of the government of Hungary ====
Court system of Hungary

- Supreme Court of Hungary
- Constitutional Court of Hungary

=== Foreign relations of Hungary ===
Foreign relations of Hungary

- Diplomatic missions of Hungary

==== International organization membership ====
International organization membership of Hungary The Republic of Hungary is a member of:

- Australia Group
- Bank for International Settlements (BIS)
- Central European Initiative (CEI)
- Confederation of European Paper Industries (CEPI)
- Council of Europe (CE)
- Euro-Atlantic Partnership Council (EAPC)
- European Bank for Reconstruction and Development (EBRD)
- European Investment Bank (EIB)
- European Organization for Nuclear Research (CERN)
- European Space Agency (ESA) (cooperating state)
- European Union (EU)
- Food and Agriculture Organization (FAO)
- Group of 9 (G9)
- International Atomic Energy Agency (IAEA)
- International Bank for Reconstruction and Development (IBRD)
- International Chamber of Commerce (ICC)
- International Civil Aviation Organization (ICAO)
- International Criminal Court (ICCt)
- International Criminal Police Organization (Interpol)
- International Development Association (IDA)
- International Energy Agency (IEA)
- International Federation of Red Cross and Red Crescent Societies (IFRCS)
- International Finance Corporation (IFC)
- International Labour Organization (ILO)
- International Maritime Organization (IMO)
- International Mobile Satellite Organization (IMSO)
- International Monetary Fund (IMF)
- International Olympic Committee (IOC)
- International Organization for Migration (IOM)
- International Organization for Standardization (ISO)
- International Red Cross and Red Crescent Movement (ICRM)
- International Telecommunication Union (ITU)
- International Telecommunications Satellite Organization (ITSO)
- International Trade Union Confederation (ITUC)
- Inter-Parliamentary Union (IPU)
- Multilateral Investment Guarantee Agency (MIGA)
- Nonaligned Movement (NAM) (guest)
- North Atlantic Treaty Organization (NATO)
- Nuclear Energy Agency (NEA)
- Nuclear Suppliers Group (NSG)
- Organisation internationale de la Francophonie (OIF) (observer)
- Organisation for Economic Co-operation and Development (OECD)
- Organization for Security and Cooperation in Europe (OSCE)
- Organisation for the Prohibition of Chemical Weapons (OPCW)
- Organization of American States (OAS) (observer)
- Permanent Court of Arbitration (PCA)
- Schengen Convention
- Southeast European Cooperative Initiative (SECI)
- United Nations (UN)
- United Nations Conference on Trade and Development (UNCTAD)
- United Nations Educational, Scientific, and Cultural Organization (UNESCO)
- United Nations High Commissioner for Refugees (UNHCR)
- United Nations Industrial Development Organization (UNIDO)
- United Nations Interim Force in Lebanon (UNIFIL)
- United Nations Mission for the Referendum in Western Sahara (MINURSO)
- United Nations Observer Mission in Georgia (UNOMIG)
- United Nations Peacekeeping Force in Cyprus (UNFICYP)
- Universal Postal Union (UPU)
- Western European Union (WEU) (associate)
- World Confederation of Labour (WCL)
- World Customs Organization (WCO)
- World Federation of Trade Unions (WFTU)
- World Health Organization (WHO)
- World Intellectual Property Organization (WIPO)
- World Meteorological Organization (WMO)
- World Tourism Organization (UNWTO)
- World Trade Organization (WTO)
- Zangger Committee (ZC)

=== Law and order in Hungary ===
Law of Hungary

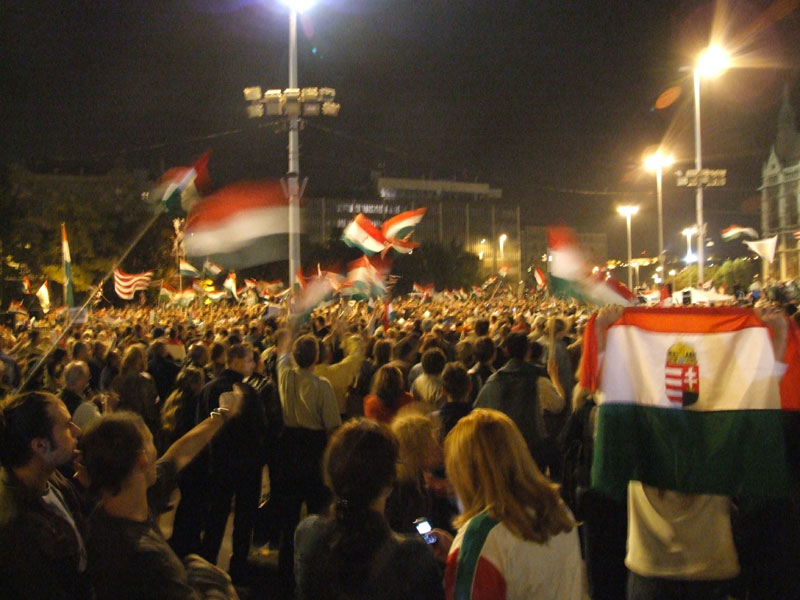
2006 protests in Hungary.

- Capital punishment in Hungary
- Constitution of Hungary
- Crime in Hungary
  - Prostitution in Hungary
- Human rights in Hungary
  - Women's rights in Hungary
  - LGBT rights in Hungary
    - Recognition of same-sex unions in Hungary
  - Freedom of religion in Hungary
- Law enforcement in Hungary
- 2006 protests in Hungary

=== Military of Hungary ===
Military of Hungary

- Command
  - Commander-in-chief: President of Hungary
    - Ministry of Defence of Hungary
      - Minister of Defence of Hungary
- Forces
  - Army of Hungary
  - Navy of Hungary: None (the country is landlocked)
  - Air Force of Hungary
- Military history of Hungary
- Military ranks of Hungary

=== Local government in Hungary ===
Name of county	County seat	Area (km^{2})	Population	Population density	Towns/ villages
Bács-Kiskun	Kecskemét	8,445	541,584	64	119
Baranya	Pécs	4,430	402,260	91	301
Békés	Békéscsaba	5,631	392,845	70	75
Borsod-Abaúj-Zemplén	Miskolc	7,247	739,143	102	355
Csongrád-Csanád	Szeged	4,263	425,785	100	60
Fejér	Székesfehérvár	4,359	428,579	98	108
Győr-Moson-Sopron	Győr	4,208	440,138	105	182
Hajdú-Bihar	Debrecen	6,211	550,265	89	82
Heves	Eger	3,637	323,769	89	119
Jász-Nagykun-Szolnok	Szolnok	5,582	413,174	74	75
Komárom-Esztergom	Tatabánya	2,265	315,886	139	76
Nógrád	Salgótarján	2,546	218,218	86	129
Pest	Budapest	6,393	1,124,395	176	186
Somogy	Kaposvár	6,036	334,065	55	244
Szabolcs-Szatmár-Bereg	Nyíregyháza	5,936	583,564	98	228
Tolna	Szekszárd	3,703	247,287	67	108
Vas	Szombathely	3,336	266,342	80	216
Veszprém	Veszprém	4,493	368,519	82	217
Zala	Zalaegerszeg	3,784	269,705	78	257

== History of Hungary ==
History of Hungary

- Timeline of the history of Hungary
- Current events of Hungary
- Military history of Hungary

== Culture of Hungary ==
Culture of Hungary

- Architecture of Hungary
- Cuisine of Hungary
- Festivals in Hungary
- Languages of Hungary
- Media in Hungary
- Museums in Hungary
- National symbols of Hungary
  - Coat of arms of Hungary
  - Flag of Hungary
  - National anthem of Hungary
- People of Hungary
- Prostitution in Hungary
- Public holidays in Hungary
- Records of Hungary
- Religion in Hungary
  - Christianity in Hungary
  - Hinduism in Hungary
  - Islam in Hungary
  - History of the Jews in Hungary
  - Sikhism in Hungary
- World Heritage Sites in Hungary

=== Art in Hungary ===
- Art in Hungary
- Architecture of Hungary
- Cinema of Hungary
- Literature of Hungary
- Music of Hungary
- Television in Hungary
- Theatre in Hungary

=== Sports in Hungary ===
Sports in Hungary

- Football in Hungary
- Hungary at the Olympics

== Economy and infrastructure of Hungary ==
Economy of Hungary

- Economic rank, by nominal GDP (2007): 49th (forty-ninth)
- Agriculture in Hungary
- Banking in Hungary
  - National Bank of Hungary
- Communications in Hungary
  - Internet in Hungary
- Companies of Hungary
- Currency of Hungary: Forint
  - ISO 4217: HUF
- Energy in Hungary
  - Energy policy of Hungary
  - Oil industry in Hungary
- Health care in Hungary
- Mining in Hungary
- Hungary Stock Exchange
- Tourism in Hungary
- Transport in Hungary
  - Airports in Hungary
  - Rail transport in Hungary
  - Roads in Hungary

== Education in Hungary ==
Education in Hungary

- List of schools in Hungary

== See also ==
Hungary

- List of Hungary-related topics
- List of international rankings
- Member state of the European Union
- Member state of the North Atlantic Treaty Organization
- Member state of the United Nations
- Outline of Europe
- Outline of geography
