= Romania–Sri Lanka relations =

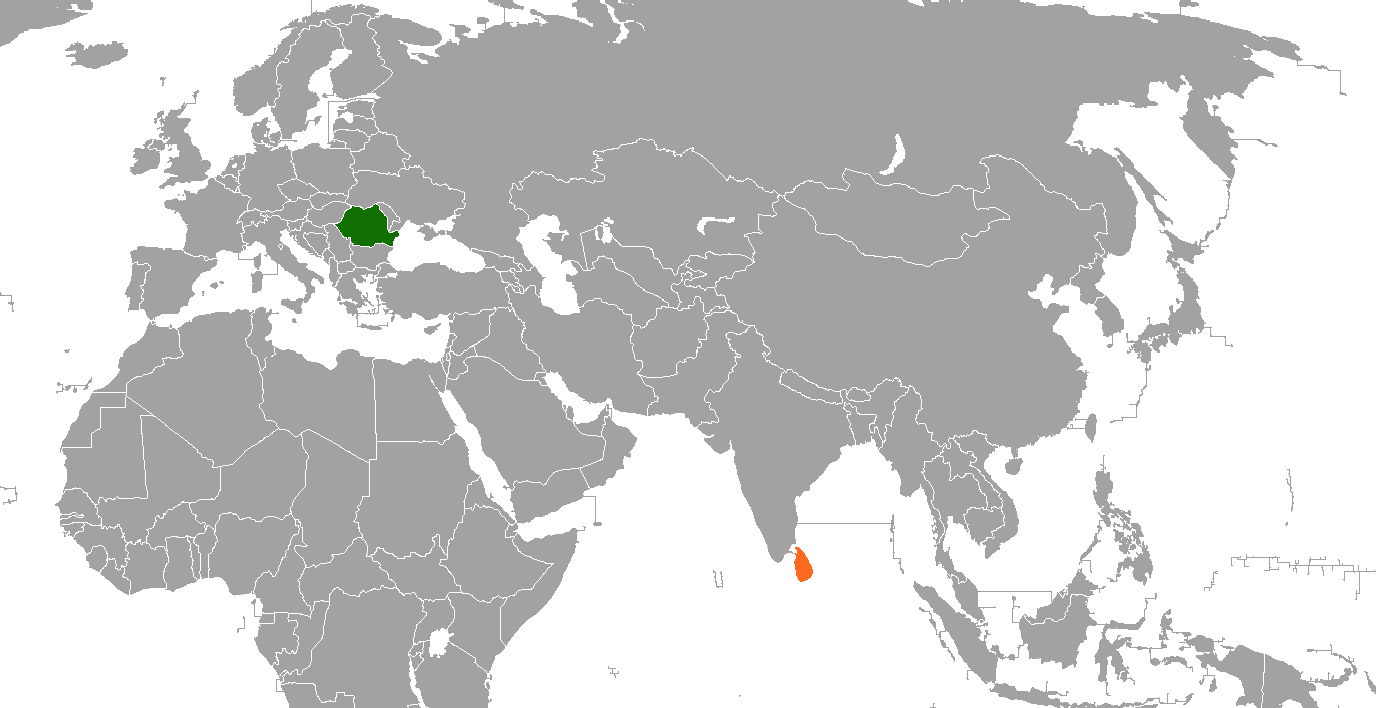

- Romania: Sri Lanka

Romania–Sri Lanka relations are the foreign relations between Romania and Sri Lanka. Romania has an embassy in Colombo and a consulate in Kandy, while Sri Lanka is represented through an embassy in Warsaw, Poland, and has a consulate in Bucharest.

== History ==
From 29 June 2017 to 2 July 2017, the Sri Lankan State Minister of Foreign Affairs Wasantha Senanayake visited Romania. He affirmed that Sri Lanka intended to improve and consolidate its bilateral relations with the country. Senanayake met with the Romanian Secretary of State for Bilateral Global Affairs Monica Gheorghiță, with whom he discussed issues in the political, economic, educational and cultural areas among others. In addition, both discussed cooperation in energy, rural development, agriculture, tourism, and other sectors. In addition, it was proposed to carry out at the end of 2017 a cultural programme featuring Romanian and Sri Lankan music, dance and cuisine in Brașov and Bucharest in Romania and in Colombo and Kandy in Sri Lanka to celebrate the 60th anniversary of the establishment of relations between the two countries.

=== 2020 Ditrău xenophobic riots ===
In 2020, an incident between two (later three) Sri Lankan workers and the population of the village of Ditrău occurred. The Sri Lankans had immigrated to this locality to work as bakers. Nevertheless, the native Székely (Hungarian) population started protesting the presence of the two workers as they "could impose their culture". It soon escalated and a petition signed by 1,800 people was sent to the town hall asking the bakery to stop hiring immigrants. It is thought that the reasons for the protests are that the population of Ditrău is not used to foreigners, in addition to the fact that the anti-immigrationist and nationalist media of the government of Viktor Orbán has "shaped" the ideology of the inhabitants. During the incident, the Sri Lankan consulate in Bucharest contacted the bakery to check the living conditions of the workers and to provide them diplomatic assistance.

== See also ==
- Foreign relations of Romania
- Foreign relations of Sri Lanka
