= Scientology in Hungary =

Scientology in Hungary operates legally but without official recognition as a religion. An "ideal org" (large church) currently operates in Budapest. A Narconon facility in Garáb, opened with much fanfare in 2013, has since closed.

A Hungarian translation of Dianetics was first published in 1990, and Scientology was first registered as a church in 1991. However, in 1993, the Hungarian Parliament classified several religions, including the Church of Scientology of Hungary, as destructive sects (Hungarian: destruktív szekta) and withdrew state support; though this category was later abolished, Hungary's national security agency, NBH, officially classified the Church of Scientology as a "religious movement that poses a danger to society" in 2006. A 2011 law, Act C, further restricted state support for religion, stripping many groups, including Scientology, of tax exemption. Speaker of Parliament László Kövér specifically initiated last-minute modifications to the church law at a Fidesz leadership meeting purportedly to ensure Scientology could never obtain recognized status.

== Connections to Fidesz and Viktor Orbán ==
Beck Zsolt, a major Scientology donor, has attracted scrutiny due to his connections to Fidesz, the political party of Prime Minister Viktor Orbán, resulting in several lucrative deals, including a 11,000,000 Ft contract with Hungary's State Audit Office, and multi-million forint deals with companies controlled by Lőrinc Mészáros, a close Orbán ally and Hungary's richest person.
