= 2020 Ditrău xenophobic incident =

2020 discrimination incident in Romania

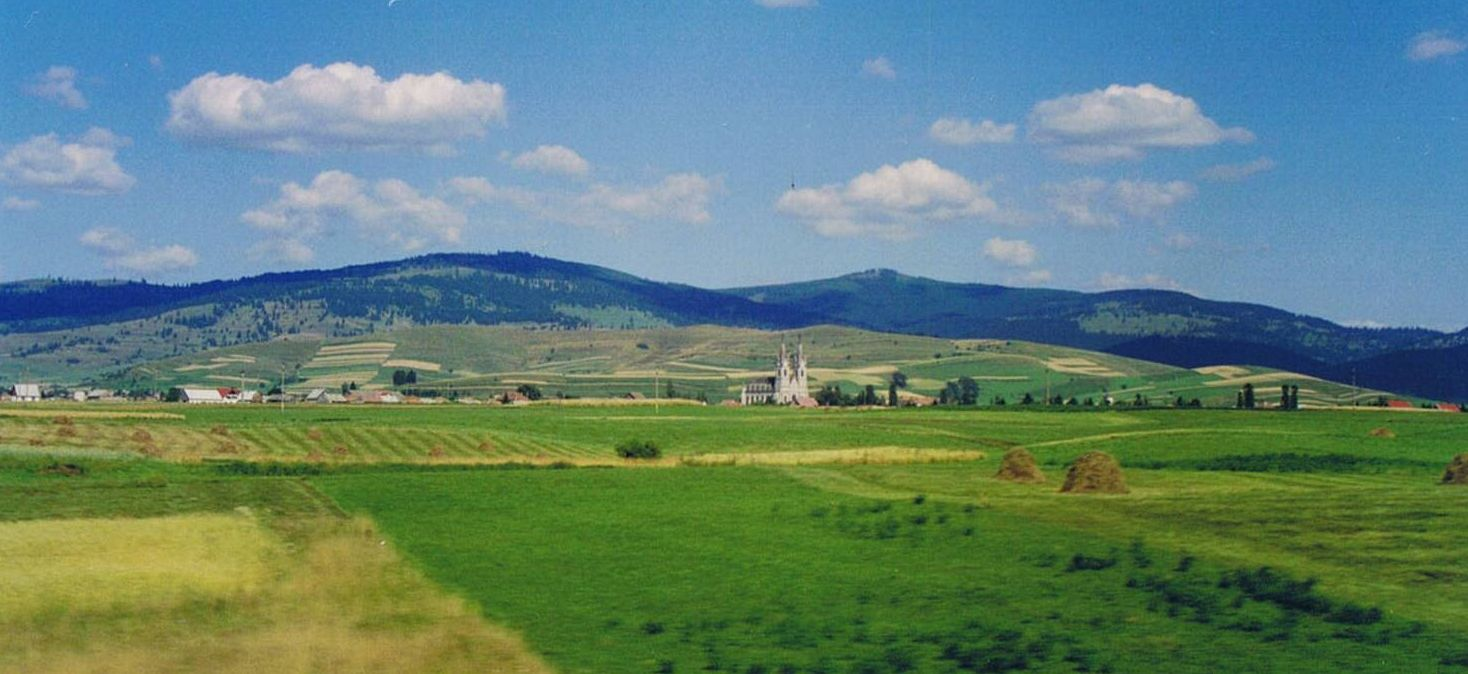
- Perspective of the village of Ditrău
- Date: 26 January 2020 – March 2020
- Location: Ditrău, Harghita, Romania; 46°51′39″N 25°34′26″E
- Caused by: Xenophobia from part of the population of Ditrău; Media promotion of racist and xenophobic ideas; General dissatisfaction with labor conditions
- Goals: Expulsion of the Sri Lankans from the bakery; Improvement of labor conditions; Stopping immigration to the village
- Methods: Protest, discrimination, social exclusion
- Result: Company fined and warned for its treatment to workers and deficiencies in safety regulations; Sri Lankans stay on the bakery; Hungarian minority blamed for the incident; Greater awareness about the existing discrimination in Romania

Parties
Ditrói Pékség bakery	A part of the population of Ditrău

Lead figures
Köllő Katalin and other company directors	Local chaplain

Number
Company owners, the three Sri Lankans, rest of company workers	Initially around 200 persons, later over 1,800 locals

The 2020 Ditrău xenophobic incident refers to the incident that started on 26 January 2020 in the village of Ditrău (Hungarian: Ditró), Harghita County, in Romania, in which around 1,800 ethnically Hungarian locals protested the employment of two, later three, Sri Lankan workers by the bakery Ditrói Pékség. The locals, led by the chaplain of the village, protested that the bakery's working conditions dissatisfied them and that they feared the immigrants could impose their culture and threaten the Hungarian local ethnic identity. On 11 February, a petition signed by 1,800 people was sent to the town hall of the village with several demands, among them, the improvement of the working conditions, the end of immigration to the village and compensations and apologies to the population.

The incident affected the reputation and income of the company, with workers and owners being repeatedly threatened by locals. The two Sri Lankans were eventually forced to move to Gheorgheni. Furthermore, the incident received great media coverage. Other previous cases that happened in other cities began to receive more attention, and there were some conflicts between the country's Romanian ethnic majority and the Hungarian minority. Sociologists and journalists have said that this is an opportunity to start debating the existing discrimination against foreigners and the overexploitation of many workers in Romania. In the end, the owner of the company, Köllő Katalin, met with the chaplain to discuss the situation. On 3 March, Kelemen Hunor, president of the Democratic Alliance of Hungarians in Romania (UDMR), announced that the situation had finally normalized.

== Background ==
Location of Ditrău

Due to the large number of Romanian citizens that have emigrated from Romania, several companies have been left without sufficient human resources, which has led them to hire immigrants. However, a 2019 study by the Romanian Institute for Evaluation and Strategy (IRES) showed that 68% of the Romanians surveyed were highly suspicious of immigrants and 50% would stop them at the border if they could.

The inhabitants of Ditrău, composed of Catholic Székelys (Hungarians), are, according to the journalist Keno Verseck, "extremely traditionalist and conservative". Ioan-Aurel Pop, president of the Romanian Academy, has declared that the community of Ditrău is a closed one, coming "from an older world". According to the sociologist Dumitru Sandu, this closure is cultural, being determined by ethnic and religious factors. Locals mainly watch, read and listen to Hungarian media close to the country's government, causing the transmission of liberalist doctrinal elements to them. Due to this affiliation with Hungarian politics, Romania matters little to the inhabitants of Ditrău. Furthermore, in 1986, this community had a conflict with the Romani minority of the village, which increased fear and hostility towards foreigners.

On the other hand, according to the newspaper Átlátszó Erdély, in Székely Land, many companies pay their employees with salaries that they consider "indecent", which contributes to the emigration of qualified human resources. Furthermore, according to the journalist Sipos Zoltán, work in the region usually includes overwork, lack of rest days and some of the hours worked are not paid. Thus, a large number of the local population currently works abroad. Journalist and sociologist Ruxandra Hurezean said there were indications that several Hungarian local leaders were rejecting investment in counties like Harghita (where Ditrău is located), as it could boost immigration to the region and affect its ethnic composition. A study has shown that of all Transylvania, Harghita and Covasna (both with a large Hungarian population) are the counties with the least amount of foreign capital invested.

Csata Zsombor, another sociologist, has indicated that, according to a study on the economy based in ethnicity in Transylvania, a non-Hungarian employee who works in a Hungarian-speaking environment earns 50 to 450 lei less per month than an employee who has the same position but in a company where he is the only Hungarian. He says that the degree of Hungarian ethnic homogeneity at work is related to disadvantage in the salary. There is an average difference of 300 lei per month if someone does not have many Romanian colleagues compared to someone who has a similar position but in a completely Romanian environment.

== Incident ==
=== January ===
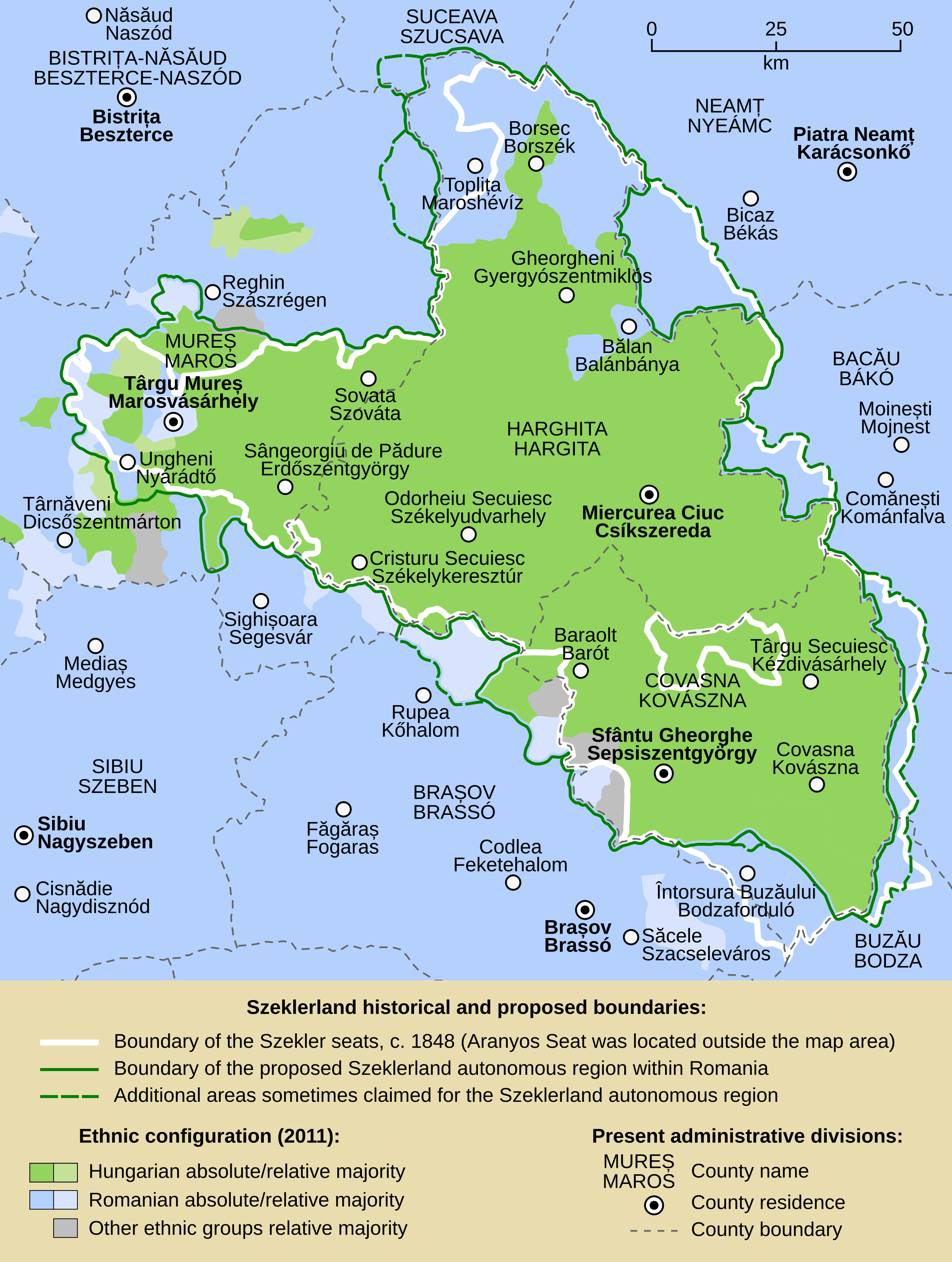
Ethnic map of Székely Land, where a large Hungarian population lives. Ditrău is located in the Harghita County.

Ditrói Pékség, in Ditrău, is a bakery built with funds from the European Community, which was in need of additional human resources at the time. Then, of the over 90 employees, only 18 were locals from Ditrău. Since the bakery's employers were unable to find new workers in the Harghita County or nearby counties, they decided to hire workers from abroad. Therefore, the bakery legally hired a baker from Hungary in 2019 and in January 2020, two bakers from Sri Lanka. One of them is Welgamage Don Prasanna Piumal, a 22-year-old Catholic, and the other is Amarashinga Archchilag Mahinda, a 48-year-old Buddhist. Both are of Sinhalese ethnicity. Further, the company announced its intention to hire another Sri Lankan and four persons from Nepal.

Almost two weeks after the employment of the two Sri Lankan bakers by the company in question, their presence led to a riot of a part of the community in Ditrău, which saw them as a threat to the village. The atmosphere of intolerance soon turned to exclusion and xenophobia. According to parishioners of the village, on 26 January, a Roman Catholic chaplain warned of the danger associated with the arrival of "strangers". The chaplain appealed to the population to ask the mayor of the commune of Ditrău to solve the problem.

On 27 January, a Facebook group with the name Migráns mentes ditrot akarunk ("We want a Ditrău without migrants") was created. For two days, in the discussions carried out on the platform, nationalist and racist threats were made at the Sri Lankan employees and the bakery owners. After becoming the spokesperson of the protesters, the chaplain organized a demonstration on 29 January in front of the town hall with around 200 locals. Among their reasons, they said that they were afraid of the emergence of "a wave of migrants", which would impose their culture and endanger the safety of the locals.

After being threatened, the Sri Lankans moved to a house in Lăzarea, a neighbouring village. The owner of the house there was also threatened, so both workers started looking for a house in Gheorgheni. The same day, the inhabitants of Ditrău announced their intention to protest during a town council meeting. The 200 locals continued protesting in the courtyard of a church, where the chaplain organized a meeting on the fate of the Székelys and the injustices suffered by them. After that, he led the group to the building in which the town council meeting was held, but due to limited space and the busy schedule of those who attended the meeting, the protest was postponed to 1 February. Afterwards, the protesters went back to the church.

The first to react were the mayor of the commune, who urged calm and tried to mediate the situation, and the employers. The directors of the company, ignoring the locals, stated that they would continue to work with Sri Lankans. The company's other workers, including some who had worked abroad, supported them as well. However, locals did not relent, beginning to boycott the company's, thus affecting its revenue, complaining that "bread is made by foreigners". In fact, the sales of the bakery dropped by 30%. Furthermore, hundreds of racist and hateful comments continued to be posted on Facebook.

=== February ===
On 1 February, approximately 300 people gathered at a meeting in the Culture House in Ditrău. The bakery owners did not participate, although they had been asked insistently to attend. They, however, sent a letter to the inhabitants in which they, among other things, apologized for not notifying them in advance of the arrival of foreigners. During the discussion, it was revealed that there had previously been a deep conflict between the company owners and the locals, and that this incident had only aggravated the situation between them. Protesters expressed dissatisfaction with the employers' attitude towards some of the company workers and the salary they had received. The financial newspaper Ziarul Financiar stated that, based on the public data of the company, the 90 workers were being paid the minimum wage.

During the meeting, locals insisted that they did not want immigrants in the village, nor did they want the two Sri Lankans to touch the bread. Fearing that the incident might escalate, the employers announced that, although both workers would be retained, they would be transferred to a different stage of the production process. In addition, they also informed the locals that if enough workers could be hired from nearby areas in the next half-year, the bakery would stop looking for people abroad. Locals did not clarify whether or not they accepted this, but agreed to send a petition to the directors with all their demands on 3 February. On the day of the meeting, the workers moved to Gheorgheni. Ștefan Mandachi, a businessman, offered them jobs in Suceava, this one being followed by more offers.

On 2 February, after the National Council for Combating Discrimination ordered to be notified in case of relocation of the two Sri Lankans to another stage of the production, the company directors announced that the workers would retain their initial work. Furthermore, they also announced that some of the other workers of the bakery were being threatened for collaborating with the foreigners. In a press release, the employers described several of the threats the locals were sending to the immigrants, including the slogan published in the Facebook group Să dăm foc ca în anul ’90 ("Let's set fire like in 1990", referring to the ethnic clashes of Târgu Mureș), stating that they would set the bakery on fire. Also, one of the bakery's businesspeople announced that due to the incident of the past days, another bakery that was planned to be built in Ditrău with funds from the European Union would be built elsewhere.

On 3 February, the local police of Gheorgheni registered a complaint by the company about the events in the village. Throughout the whole incident, the Sri Lankan embassy, concerned about the safety of two workers, stayed in contact with them. On 4 February, the bakery was fined 10,000 lei, and the employers received a warning due to four minor irregularities.

The day after a third Sri Lankan worker arrived in Romania on 10 February to work in the bakery, several residents and the chaplain presented the petition agreed at the meeting of 1 February signed by more than 1,800 persons from the village to the town hall. The petition was directed to the town hall, the town council and the bakery. In it, the locals asked the bakery employers not to employ more immigrants, as the local unemployment rate "surpassed 2% of the population" and "the emigration of young people had to be stopped". In addition, the petitioners requested to be shown the documents regarding the professional qualification of the first two Sri Lankans along with their personal documents and the medical certificate. Apologies were sought by the locals and the chaplain for "damage to their reputation", as well as financial compensation to harmed and offended workers for 5 years. Other requests included paid holidays.

On 21 February, the owner of the company, Köllő Katalin, announced that it had hired another four workers from Nepal, who would arrive in about a month. In addition, she said the petition had not yet been officially received by the company. On 26 February, the bakery owner met with the chaplain to discuss the incident and the dissatisfaction expressed by the locals. After a consensus was reached, the company expected the workers to continue working, and the local priest, Bíró Károly, urged the population of Ditrău to work at the bakery. The village mayor, Puskás Elemér, said that the situation "is about to normalize". In addition, it was stated that another company in Ditrău was filling an application to bring between 5 and 10 foreign workers to the village. On 3 March, the president of the Democratic Alliance of Hungarians in Romania (UDMR), Kelemen Hunor, declared that things had finally calmed down.

== Consequences ==
The media coverage of what happened in Ditrău brought to light the fact that it was not an isolated case in Romania. A partner of the company Soter & Partners, which, among other things, brings foreign workers to the country, mentioned several similar cases. Among them was one from Cluj-Napoca, in which several persons protested the presence of Sri Lankan workers in a restaurant and sent a petition to the town hall. Other cases occurred in Râmnicu Vâlcea and in Bucharest. Until February 2020, however, there was no data specifying in how many localities in Romania similar phenomena had happened.

The incident attracted great attention from the ethnic Romanian public, who began to discuss the "export of ideologies" given by the government of Viktor Orbán. There were also Romanians who used the incident to carry out nationalist attacks on the country's Hungarian minority. As for Hungarians, the events showed that even though some Hungarians adopted "strategies" to "demonstrate superiority" and "preserve the Hungarian ethnic identity", the minority is in a vulnerable position with respect to Romania, evidenced by the presentation of the events in Ditrău as a case of racism of the Hungarian community by a large part of Romanian media. Due to the lack of a dominant position, many Hungarians have leaned to a far-right ideology, which according to the journalists Tamás Kiss and Tibor Toró, hinders the possibility of Romanian Hungarians to make a credible and honest speech on their minority rights.

According to the journalist Răzvan Bibire, the incident also presents an opportunity to start discussing at a national level the overexploitation suffered by many employees and the difficulties they have in defending their labor rights. It is unknown how possible future cases of this type will be treated. There is a possibility that the media may try to strengthen interethnic borders or attempt to subordinate political objectives. It is also possible that the incident will trigger an open debate on the problems of Romanian society, such as power relations, marginalization and xenophobia.

The incident served as a basis for R.M.N., a 2022 drama film written and directed by Cristian Mungiu.

== See also ==
- Antiziganism
- Human rights in Romania
- Minorities of Romania
- Romania–Sri Lanka relations
