= Ditrău mine =

Zirconium mine in Romania

- Location within Romania
- Location: Ditrău, Harghita County, Romania; 46°0′0″N 25°0′0″E (estimated)
- Products: Zirconium

The Ditrău mine is a large zirconium mine located in central Romania in Harghita County, close to Ditrău. Ditrău represents one of the largest zirconium reserves in Romania having estimated reserves of 100,000 tonnes of ore grading 2% zirconium metal.
