= Open access in Hungary =

Open access to scholarly communication in Hungary has developed in recent years through digital repositories and academic publishers, among other means. In 2008 several academic libraries founded the Hungarian Open Access Repositories (HUNOR) consortium.

== Repositories ==
There are a number of collections of scholarship in Hungary housed in digital open access repositories. They contain journal articles, book chapters, data, and other research outputs that are free to read.

== See also ==
- Education in Hungary
- Internet in Hungary
- Media of Hungary
- Science and technology in Hungary
- Open access in other countries
