= R.M.N. =

2022 film by Cristian Mungiu

- Romanian theatrical release poster
- Directed by: Cristian Mungiu
- Written by: Cristian Mungiu
- Produced by: Cristian Mungiu
- Starring: Marin Grigore; Judith State
- Cinematography: Tudor Vladimir Panduru
- Edited by: Mircea Olteanu
- Production companies: Mobra Films; Why Not Productions; France 3 Cinéma; Les Films du Fleuve; Film i Väst
- Distributed by: Voodoo Films (Romania); Le Pacte (France)
- Release dates: 21 May 2022 (Cannes); 3 June 2022 (Romania)
- Running time: 125 minutes
- Countries: Romania; France; Belgium; Sweden
- Languages: Romanian; Hungarian; German; English; French
- Budget: €2.8 million
- Box office: $740,000

R.M.N. is a 2022 drama film produced, written and directed by Cristian Mungiu. Set in a multi-ethnic village in Transylvania during the 2019–20 holiday season, it is based on the 2020 Ditrău xenophobic incident. It follows Matthias, a man who returns from Germany, and his ex-lover Csilla, who works in the village. Mungiu named the film after the Romanian acronym for nuclear magnetic resonance, as the film is "an investigation of the brain, a brain scan trying to detect things below the surface".

The film had its world premiere in the main competition of the 2022 Cannes Film Festival on 21 May, where it competed for the Palme d'Or. It received critical acclaim, with praise towards Mungiu's direction and screenplay. It was theatrically released in Romania by Voodoo Films on 3 June.

== Cast ==
- Marin Grigore as Matthias
- Judith State as Csilla
- Macrina Bârlădeanu as Ana
- Orsolya Moldován as Mrs. Dénes
- Andrei Finți as Papa Otto
- Mark Blenyesi as Rudi
- Ovidiu Crișan as Mr. Baciu

== Production ==
A co-production between Romania, France, Belgium and Sweden. It was produced by Mobra Films, Why Not Productions, France 3 Cinéma, Les Films du Fleuve and Film i Väst.

Mungiu wrote the screenplay in the spring of 2021. Filming took place from November 2021 to January 2022 in Rimetea and other villages across Transylvania.

== Release ==
The film premiered at the 2022 Cannes Film Festival in the main competition. In May 2022, IFC Films acquired the North American rights ahead of the premiere, and released it in US theaters on April 28, 2023.

It also screened at the 2022 Toronto International Film Festival, in the Contemporary World Cinema category, as well as at the 29th edition of the European Film Festival Palić, and the 15th edition of the Central and Eastern European Film Festival in Luxembourg.

== Reception ==
=== Box office ===
It grossed $740k in its worldwide theatrical run. France represented more than 50% of the global total, with a $372k total run in French cinemas.

=== Critical response ===
On the review aggregator website Rotten Tomatoes, 96% of 69 critics' reviews are positive, with an average rating of 8.1/10. The website's consensus reads: "R.M.N.'s spare, elegant approach lends a deceptively cool surface to its caustic take on cultural divisions." Metacritic, which uses a weighted average, assigned the film a score of 81 out of 100, based on 20 critics, indicating "universal acclaim".

=== Accolades ===
It was awarded the Golden Tower for Best Film at the 2022 European Film Festival Palić and received a Special Mention from the Press Jury of the 2022 CinEast Film Festival in Luxembourg.
