= Ditrău (river) =

Ditrău Ditró-patak
- Location within Romania

Location
- Country: Romania
- Counties: Harghita County
- Villages: Ditrău

Physical characteristics
- Mouth: Mureș
  - location: Ditrău
  - coordinates: 46.8160°N 25.4667°E
- Length: 16 km (9.9 mi)
- Basin size: 34 km^{2} (13 sq mi)

Basin features
- Progression: Mureș→ Tisza→ Danube→ Black Sea

The Ditrău (Hungarian: Ditró-patak) is a right tributary of the river Mureș in Transylvania, Romania. It discharges into the Mureș in the village Ditrău. Its length is 16 km (9.9 mi) and its basin size is 34 km^{2} (13 sq mi).
