= Abortion in Hungary =

Abortion has been legal in Hungary under certain restrictions since 1953. The most recent change to abortion laws being Act LXXIX of 1992 on the protection of fetal life. Under the current laws, abortions may be performed up to 12 weeks due to socioeconomic factors but may be extended up to 24 weeks in certain circumstances like risk to woman's life, health, rape or fetal impairment. Access to abortion requires the woman to obtain a certificate from a gynecologist confirming the pregnancy then seek counseling from a midwife at the Family Protection Service at least twice and wait 72 hours before the procedure may be performed.

== History of legalisation ==
=== Abortion in socialist Hungary ===
Abortion was subject to legal liberalization as early as 1953. The abortion law was changed three times since then, in 1956, 1973, and 1992. As a result of that, Hungary has long had a liberal abortion law, although certain obstacles for accessing abortion have always existed. After the fall of communism in Hungary, the country experienced serious social and economic distress; nevertheless, the newly emerging conservative Catholic forces have failed to convince the government to prohibit abortion: the new post-communist 1992 law largely mirrored the old one, in some ways being even more liberal than the former one.

=== Current law ===
Abortion is regulated under the Act LXXIX of 1992 on the protection of fetal life. Under this law, an abortion is normally allowed until 12 weeks. However, in certain circumstances the limit can be extended to 18, 20 or 24 weeks. A pregnancy may be terminated at any time if the fetus is lethally affected (i.e. anencephaly). The pregnancy can be extended to 18 weeks if the woman's health is in severe danger or is a result of a rape and that added to those conditions, the woman was not aware of her pregnancy before because of a medical condition or of an institution's mistake. To extend it to 24 weeks, the fetus must have a 50% risk of presenting a genetic or teratological malformation (see Birth defect).

In 1998, the country's highest court demanded that a definition be supplied for the term "grave crisis situation", as there were concerns that women undergoing the procedure may not actually be in "crisis", and if they were, that they get psychiatric help after their abortion. On June 29, 2000, the Ministry of Health defined a "grave crisis situation" as "when it causes bodily or mental impairment, or a socially intolerable situation".

The Hungarian Government organized an anti-abortion campaign in 2011 where posters were shown with an image of a baby in the womb, with the caption saying, "I understand that you are not yet ready for me, but give me up to the adoption agency, LET ME LIVE!" The Government has been sharply criticised for using European Union funds on the campaign. An EU Commissioner Viviane Reding said that the campaign "goes against European values."

The new constitution of Hungary, enacted in 2012, states that human life will be protected from the moment of conception, although, so far, the abortion law has not been changed.

Since 2017, because of demographic challenges, Orban's government has put in place a new Family policy in Hungary with the Family Protection Action Plan, providing for example, a flat tax and family allowances in order to increase natality rates in Hungary. With this pro-natalist policy, hospitals have the rights to refuse to provide abortions, clinics that are providing them without trying to discourage women have to face political pressure and the government is putting in place anti-abortion campaigns in the metro and in the schools. Those campaigns are a violation of the European Union's rules regarding the financing programme that Hungary is receiving.

In 2022 15 September, Hungary passed new abortion restrictions, with a Mandatory ultrasounds bill. Where women who are seeking an abortion will now be obliged to “listen to the foetal heartbeat” before they can have an abortion. This Bill was pushed for by the far-right Mi Hazánk (Our Homeland) party.

== The procedure ==
Hungary is influenced by Roman Catholicism, and, although abortion is legal, it is not easy to access: women must go through a specific procedure involving counseling, a waiting period, and a certificate from a midwife in order to obtain an abortion.

To terminate a pregnancy, the woman and, if possible, the father are required to meet with the Family Protection Service at least twice to receive information about the termination of the pregnancy. The woman has to bring a letter from her gynecologist to confirm the pregnancy and the specially trained midwife of the Family Protection Service will provide her information to choose another solution. If the woman still wants the abortion, she has to come back within 72 hours. The staff member will provide her information about the termination process and issue a hospital referral that the woman and, if possible, the father, must sign. On the day of the abortion, the woman can go to the health institution of her choice and must again sign documents confirming the termination of her pregnancy. According to the Committee on the Elimination of Discrimination against Women, conscientious objection among Hungarian doctors is an obstacle to abortion.

== Statistics ==
Percentage of conceptions which led to an abortion in Hungary

Between 2010 and 2015 the number of reported abortions per year dropped by 22.9 per cent, which was attributed to the introduction of pro-family measures by the Hungarian Government. Adoption is promoted by the state where women do not want to keep their baby. There are also educational classes and aid to families. In July 2022, it was reported that a number of medical practitioners willing to perform abortions had been decreasing.

Source: Statistics of the Hungarian Central Statistical Office
Year	Number of reported abortions	Induced abortion ratio per 100 live birth			
Year	Number of reported abortions	Induced abortion ratio per 100 live birth	1950	1,707	0.9
1951	1,700	1.0			
1952	1,700	1.1			
1953	2,800	1.0			
1954	16,300	7.2			
1955	35,398	16.8			
1956	82,463	42.8			
1957	123,383	73.8			
1958	145,578	91.9			
1959	152,404	100.8			
1960	162,160	110.7			
1961	169,992	121.1			
1962	163,656	125.8			
1963	173,835	131.4			
1964	184,367	139.5			
1965	180,269	135.5			
1966	186,773	134.9			
1967	187,527	126.0			
1968	201,096	130.2			
1969	206,817	134.0			
1970	192,283	126.7			
1971	187,425	124.4			
1972	179,035	116.8			
1973	169,650	108.6			
1974	102,022	54.8			
1975	96,212	49.5			
1976	94,720	51.1			
1977	89,096	50.2			
1978	83,545	49.7			
1979	80,767	50.4			
1980	80,882	54.4			
1981	78,421	54.9			
1982	78,682	58.9			
1983	78,599	61.8			
1984	82,191	65.6			
1985	81,970	63.0			
1986	83,586	65.2			
1987	84,547	67.2			
1988	87,106	70.1			
1989	90,508	73.4			
1990	90,394	71.9			
1991	89,931	70.7			
1992	87,065	71.5			
1993	75,258	64.3			
1994	74,491	64.4			
1995	76,957	68.7			
1996	76,600	72.8			
1997	74,564	74.3			
1998	68,971	70.9			
1999	65,981	69.7			
2000	59,249	60.7			
2001	56,404	58.1			
2002	56,075	57.9			
2003	53,789	56.8			
2004	52,539	55.2			
2005	48,689	49.9			
2006	46,324	46.4			
2007	43,870	44.9			
2008	44,089	44.5			
2009	43,181	44.8			
2010	40,449	44.8			
2011	38,443	43.7			
2012	36,118	40.0			
2013	34,891	39.3			
2014	32,663	35.7			
2015	31,176	34.0			
2016	30,439	32.7			
2017	28,496	31.1			
2018	26,941	30.0			
2019	25,783	28.9			
2020	23,901	25.9			
2021	21,907	23.5			
2022	21,779	24.6			

== See also ==
- Women in Hungary
