= International rankings of Hungary =

These are the international rankings of Hungary.

== Demographics ==
- Population ranked 93 out of 195 countries (2017 est.)
- Life expectancy ranked 57 out of 183 countries (2015)

=== Economy ===
- Consumption tax / VAT: at 27% it's ranked top 1 out of out of 190 countries. (2019)
- Index of Economic Freedom: ranked 54 out of 178 countries. (2016)
- Ease of Doing Business Index: ranked 41 out of 190 countries. (2017)
- Inequality adjusted Human Development Index ranked 28 out of 151 countries (2015)
- Trade Freedom Index ranked 20 out of 179 countries. (2016)
- Fiscal Freedom Index ranked 96 out of 179 countries. (2016)
- Monetary Freedom Index ranked 2 out of 181 countries. (2016)
- Social Progress Index ranked 37 out of 128 countries. (2017)
- Fragile States Index ranked 135 out of 178 countries. (2017)
- International Monetary Fund: GDP in purchasing power parity ranked 59 out of 190 (2017 est.)
- International Monetary Fund: GDP per capita in purchasing power parity ranked 45 out of 186 (2016)
- The World Factbook: Labour force participation ranked 87 out of 202 (2013 est.)
- The World Factbook: exports ranked 35 out of 204 (2015 est.)
- The World Factbook: imports ranked 34 out of 222 (2016 est.)

=== International rankings ===
Organization	Survey	Position
Institute for Economics and Peace	Global Peace Index	19th out of 163 (2016)
United Nations Development Programme	Inequality-adjusted HDI	28th out of 151 (2016)
Transparency International	Corruption Perceptions Index	57th out of 180 (2016)
World Economic Forum	Global Competitiveness Report	58th out of 133 (2014)
International Living Magazine	Quality of Life	20th out of 194 (2014)
World Intellectual Property Organization	Global Innovation Index	36th out of 139 (2026)
Bloomberg L.P.	Bloomberg Innovation Index	32nd out of 50 (2016)
Boston Consulting Group	International Innovation Index	31st out of 110 (2016)
World Bank Group	R&D spending as % of GDP	25th out of 87 (2015)
World Bank Group	List of countries by income equality	24th out of 176 (2016)
World Bank Group	Ease of doing business index	41st out of 190 (2016)
Simon Anholt	Good Country Index	24th out of 163 (2016)
Yale Center for Environmental L&P	Environmental Performance Index	28th out of 180 (2016)
KOF Globalization Index	Globalization Index	10th out of 207 (2017)
The Observatory of Economic Complexity	Economic Complexity Index	14th out of 124 (2015)
Social Progress Imperative	Social Progress Index	32nd out of 165 (2015)
United Nations	Education Index	27th out of 187 (2013)
International Telecommunication Union	Broadband Internet subscriptions	36th out of 193 (2014)
Property Rights Alliance	International Property Rights Index	46th out of 129 (2015)
