= Geology of Hungary =

Hungary is in the Pannonian Basin in Central Europe, is surrounded by the Carpathians, Alps and Dinarides, but for the most part dominated by lowlands. Sixty-eight percent of the country is lowlands below 200 meters altitude. Hilly terrain covers 30% of the country, while mountains cover only 2%. The entire Pannonian Basin is in the Danube watershed.

== Tectonics and bedrock geology ==
Hungary is mostly defined by Late Cenozoic geologic evolution. Large back-arc basins formed due to anomalous crust thinning and a high geothermal gradient. The Pannonian Basin is actually a system of basins, including the Great Plain Basin, the Vienna Basin, the Drava Basin and the Transylvanian Basin. The different sub-basins are separated by inselberg ranges, made of Paleozoic, Mesozoic, and Paleogene sedimentary rocks and Cenozoic igneous and sedimentary rocks.

The Eastern Alps extend into the northwest of Hungary as the Sopron and Kőszeg mountains, near the Austrian border and are made up of metamorphosed Paleozoic and Mesozoic rock sequences. The Transdanubian Range spans 250 kilometers, including hills and mountains. To the north of Lake Balaton, in the Balaton Highland, geologists have found Lower Paleozoic phyllite and carbonates. Northeast of Lake Balaton, in the Velence Hills, Carboniferous granite is most common. Triassic carbonates make up other parts of the Transdanubian mountains, although a small area of Jurassic, Cretaceous and Paleogene rocks are found in the central zone of the synform and control the basic structure of the mountains.

The North Hungarian Mountains have very complicated geology. Paleozoic slate and carbonate are found in the Szendor and Uppony Hills, and the Bükk mountains are slightly metamorphosed Upper Paleozoic and Jurassic sedimentary and igneous rocks. A few Carboniferous granites are in the southeast of the Mecsek mountains.

== Sediments and stratigraphy ==
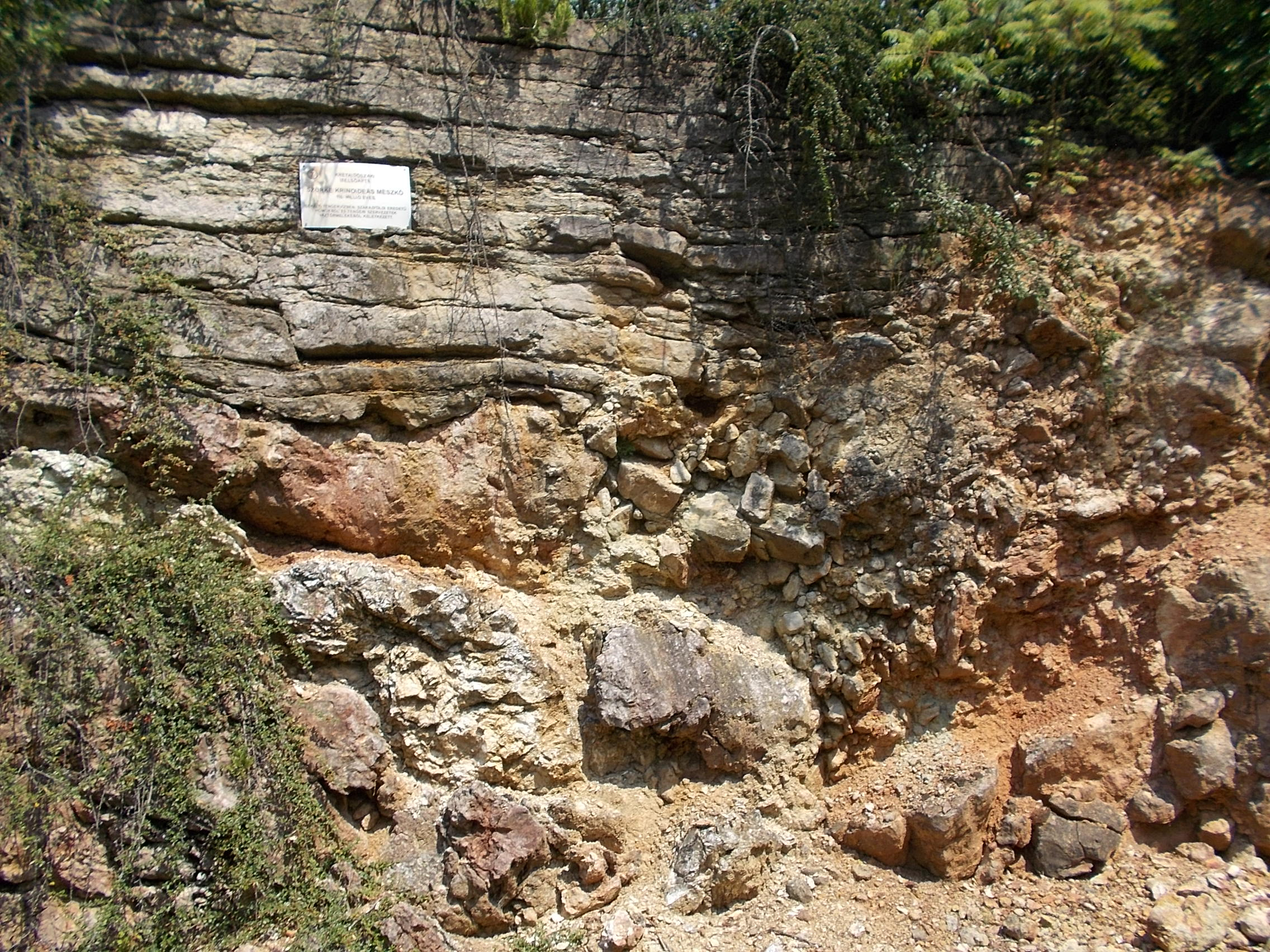
Layers of crinoidal limestone, formed during the Mesozoic Era, in Tata

Lakes, rivers and river deltas deposited sediments in the basins between one kilometer and eight kilometers thick during the Late Miocene into the Pliocene, as the Pannonian Lake dominated the landscape. These sediments were covered over in the Quaternary by alluvial deposits, wind-blown sand and loess, which now makes up the surface of the Pannonian Plain.

== History of geologic research ==
Beudant, a professor at the University of Paris published the first writings about Hungarian geology in 1822. The Imperial and Royal Geological Survey of the Austro-Hungarian Empire conducted geologic mapping in Hungary between 1850 and 1865, and published maps between 1867 and 1871. The Royal Hungarian Geological Survey took over mapping after its creation in 1869. Widespread drilling for thousands of artesian wells and 500 thermal wells expanded geologic knowledge in the second half of the 19th century. Hungarian physicist and geophysicist, Loránd Eötvös carried out gravity measurements using the torsion balance technique, helping to launch geophysics. After his death, students named the Loránd Eötvös Geophysical Institute in his honor. By World War II independent Hungary had five active university geology departments.

Mapping increased after the war, with a growing staff at the Geological Survey and a new map was released in 1956. Understanding of Hungarian geology changed with the introduction of plate tectonics theories in the 1970s, which changed views on the formation of the Pannonian Basin.

== Natural resource geology ==
At the time of the Treaty of Trianon, Hungary was rich in minerals, but most of these resources are now outside Hungary's borders in the Slovak Ore Mountains and the Apuseni Mountains in Transylvania. Today, Hungary is poor in natural resources. After the 1989 revolution, bauxite mining virtually ended and coal production dropped. Power plants still strip mine locally for lignite, and oil and gas are important resources.

Historically, bauxite was sometimes known as "Hungarian silver," due to large deposits of bauxite near Lake Balaton. As surface resource were depleted, mining went underground, lowering the karst water table. Bauxites formed in tropical climates in the Barremian age of the Early Cretaceous. Like Jamaican bauxites, heavy tropical rainfall stripped away other minerals draining into the porous underlying karst and creating sediments enriched in aluminum.
