= Women in Hungary =

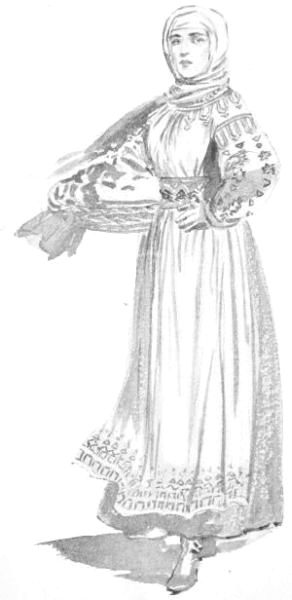
- Hungarian peasant in the 17th century - illustration by Percy Anderson for Costume Fanciful, Historical and Theatrical, 1906

General statistics
- Maternal mortality (per 100,000): 21
- Women in parliament: 12.6% (2018)
- Women over 25 with secondary education: 93.2% (2010)
- Women in labour force: 63% (employment rate OECD definition, 2019)

Gender Inequality Index
- Value: 0.221 (2021)
- Rank: 55th out of 191

Global Gender Gap Index
- Value: 0.699 (2022)
- Rank: 88th out of 146

The roles of women in Hungary have changed significantly over the past 200 years. Historically, in the present day territory of Hungary, discourses on women’s roles, rights, and political access, along with feminist movements, have developed within the context of extremely traditional gender roles that were influenced by Roman Catholicism, Lutheranism and Calvinism. More recently, the Communist doctrine on women’s place in society was also influential. The post-communist era in Hungary has produced a number of organizations to address the needs of the nation’s women and mobilize female voters, and several universities now have gender studies programs. In the 21st century, the entry in the European Union has led to a more 'Westernized' culture.

== Pre-WWI ==
In 1790, a man named Péter Bárány petitioned the National Gathering of Hungarian Noblemen to grant female nobles the right to observe the Gathering's proceedings. He argued that these women would be better prepared to raise politically active, patriotic sons, but the assembly did not accept his petition. The first women’s organization to form in Hungary was the Pester Women's Charitable Society, founded in 1817; by the end of the nineteenth century there were several hundred similar organizations throughout the kingdom, although, for the most part, they had little involvement in politics. When women gained access to secondary education in the mid-nineteenth century, the large presence of active women’s groups helped win the students a more academic curriculum, rather than one that focused on being a wife and mother. In 1895, women were first allowed to study philosophy, medicine, and pharmacy at the university level.

In addition to the advocacy of women’s groups, these advances were due, in part, to the Hungarian push to elevate its status as a power in the Austrian-Hungarian Empire, and present itself as an increasingly modernized region.

Rózsika Bédy-Schwimmer

In 1904, Rózsika Bédy-Schwimmer (Rosika Schwimmer), a pacifist and women’s rights advocate, founded the Association of Feminists. The group pushed for women's suffrage and helped bring the issue to a parliamentary vote on three separate occasions, although each attempt was unsuccessful. The Men's League for Women's Suffrage was founded in 1910, and in 1913 the 7th Congress of the International Women's Suffrage Alliance met in Budapest. The Association of Feminists worked closely with the city council of Budapest to establish a women's aid office and day care centers; they also published a journal on women's issues that helped to raise public awareness of women's concerns. Other groups active in the early twentieth century included female members of the Social Democrats, and the National Federation of Women Clerical Workers, which sought improvements in the rights of female professionals.

== Between the wars ==
Following World War I, an independent Hungary began to define itself in a “national framework,” and the women’s movement shifted to fit into this new framework effectively.

Following the brief Communist seizure of power by Béla Kun in 1919, feminist groups, and other organizations considered revolutionary, became smaller, covert, and less influential; finding themselves in similar circumstances, some feminists, Communists, and other radicals formed working relationships. On 25 March 1920, Margit Slachta was elected as a member of the National Assembly in the 1st district of Budapest. She became the first woman Member of Parliament in the history of Hungary. Hungarian women won partial suffrage and the right to serve in parliament, while the emergence of a party system of government gave women a new, socially accepted avenue for recognition and involvement. Women were particularly active in the National Unity Party and the Christian Women’s Camp. As their political opportunities expanded, Hungarian women were simultaneously gaining attention and support in a very traditional role: as mothers and caretakers of the nation’s children. Beginning in 1941, women’s groups began to diverge further, due mainly to political events leading up to World War II.

== Suffrage and politics ==
Women attained limited suffrage in 1918 (voting for the first time in 1922); and full suffrage in 1945, but as in other communist states, civil rights of both men and women were symbolic, as the system was an authoritarian one. During the communist era, women were members of the parliament (they made up 18% of members in 1949 and 30% in 1980), but this was merely for the facade, as they had little power in practice, with the key players deciding policies being men. Hungary held its first free elections after the fall of communism, and only 7% of the elected members were women in 1990. As of 2018, women made up 12.6% of the parliament.

== Communist era ==
Women were seen as a vital part of the productivity of the state, both as mothers and wives of male workers, and as workers themselves. Although women were included in the workforce in a more equal way under communist rule, they generally were placed under greater state control with regard to their personal freedoms, especially concerning reproductive rights, sexuality, and family life. Despite the official discourse on equality, the communist regime did not seek to genuinely address the deep social fabric of gender subordination. Nevertheless, women did see some gains under communism, despite remaining subordinate to men; they received greater access to secondary and university education, especially in technical fields.

== Post-communist era ==
Beginning in 1989, women’s and feminist groups formed and established strong organizations which have worked to address the needs of Hungarian women. The post-communist economy has been particularly hard on blue-collar women who, in addition to providing income, are responsible for maintaining a home and caring for the family. Another important issue for women in the early 1990s was the restriction of abortion rights by conservative political parties. The Feminist Network, which emerged in May 1990, has been a leader in carrying on the movement for women’s equality, and the Federation of Young Democrats has been an important political party for female youth and women’s movements. The issue of domestic violence has also come to public attention during the past two decades; an important change was the removal of the marital exemption from the rape law in 1997. Hungary has also ratified the Council of Europe Convention on Action against Trafficking in Human Beings in 2013. In December 2020, Hungary’s Family Minister, Katalin Novák, published a video, lecturing women on how to achieve success, advising, among else, not to expect to get an equal pay.

== Family life, fertility and reproductive health ==
As in most other European countries, in the 21st century, family dynamics have become more liberal, with cohabitation growing in popularity, and the link between fertility and marriage decreasing. In 2015, 47.9% of births were to unmarried women. Hungary has a sub-replacement fertility rate; the total fertility rate (TFR) was 1.43 children born/woman in 2015. The maternal mortality rate in Hungary is 21 deaths/100,000 live births (as of 2010).

== See also ==
- Abortion in Hungary
- Gender roles in post-communist Central and Eastern Europe
- Human rights in Hungary
- Women in Europe
- LGBTQ rights in Hungary
