= Telecommunications in Hungary =

Telecommunications in Hungary include radio, television, fixed and mobile telephones, and the Internet.

== Early history ==
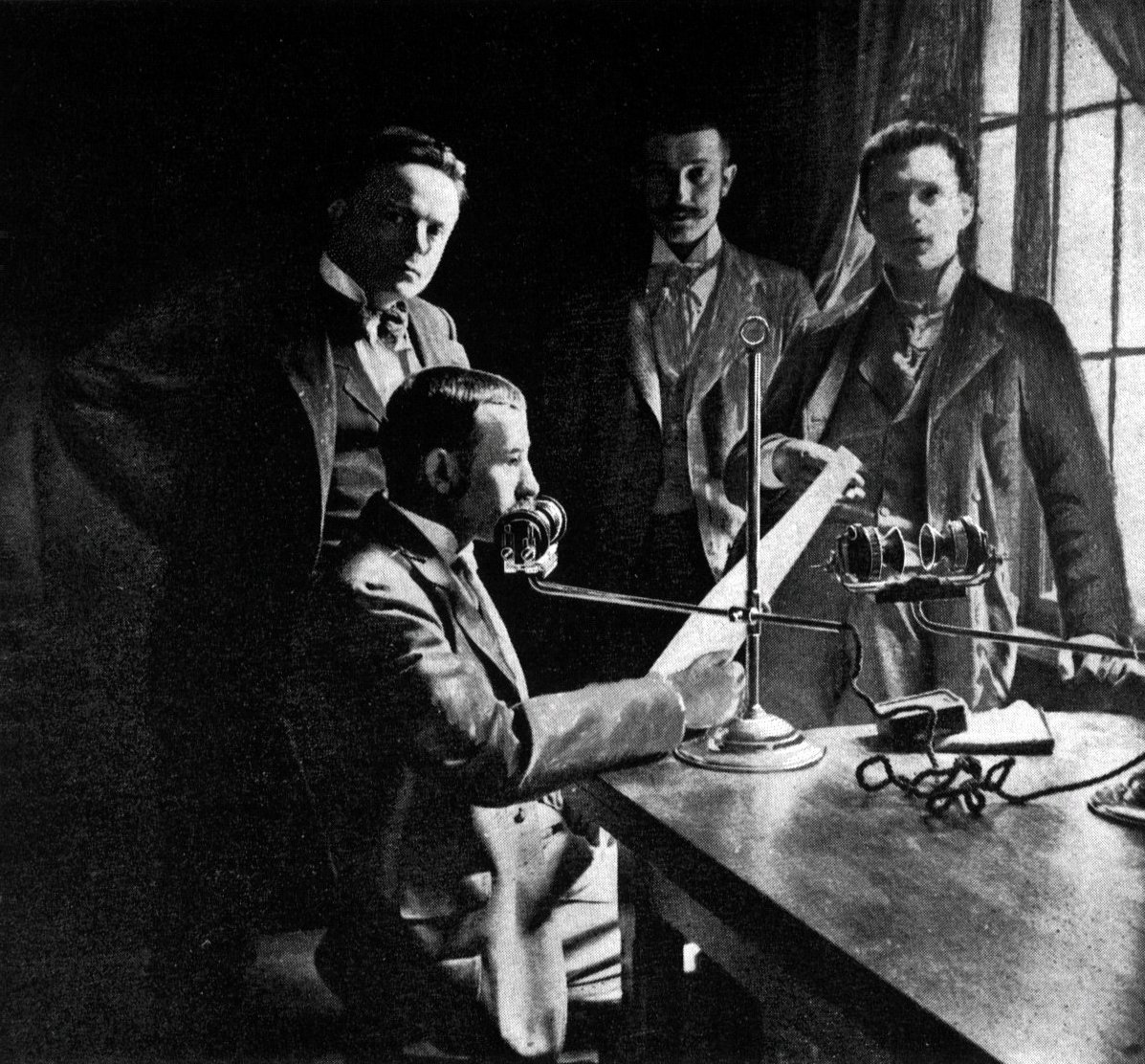
A stentor reading the day's news in the Telefon Hírmondó studio

The first telegraph station on Hungarian territory was opened in December 1847 in Pressburg/ Pozsony /Bratislava/. In 1848, during the Hungarian Revolution, another telegraph centre was built in Buda to connect the most important governmental centres. The first telegraph connection between Vienna and Pest – Buda (later Budapest) was constructed in 1850. In 1884, 2,406 telegraph post offices operated in the Kingdom of Hungary. By 1914 the number of telegraph offices reached 3,000 in post offices, and a further 2,400 were installed in the railway stations of the Kingdom of Hungary.

The first Hungarian telephone exchange was opened in Budapest (May 1, 1881). All telephone exchanges of the cities and towns in the Kingdom of Hungary were linked in 1893. By 1914, more than 2,000 settlements had telephone exchange in the Kingdom of Hungary.

The Telefon Hírmondó (Telephone Herald) service was established in 1893. Two decades before the introduction of radio broadcasting, residents of Budapest could listen to news, cabaret, music and opera at home and in public spaces daily. It operated over a special type of telephone exchange system and its own separate network. The technology was later licensed in Italy and the United States. (see: telephone newspaper).

The first Hungarian telephone factory (Factory for Telephone Apparatuses) was founded by János Neuhold in Budapest in 1879, which produced telephones microphones, telegraphs, and telephone exchanges.

In 1884, the Tungsram company also started to produce microphones, telephone apparatuses, telephone switchboards and cables.

The Ericsson company also established a factory for telephones and switchboards in Budapest in 1911.

== Radio and television ==
Hungary has a mix of state-supported public and private broadcasters. Hungary's digital transition has been postponed to the end of 2014.

Radio stations:

- Three state-supported public-service radio networks and numerous local radio stations including commercial, public service, nonprofit, and community stations
- 17 AM, 57 FM, and 3 shortwave stations (1998).

Television stations:

- the three publicly owned and two privately owned TV stations are the major national broadcasters; many special interest channels; about two-thirds of viewers utilize satellite and cable TV services (2007);
- 35 plus 161 low-power repeaters (1995).

== Telephone ==
Calling code: 36

International call prefix: 00

Main lines: 3.0 million lines in use, 51st in the world (2012).

Mobile network: 11.6 million lines, 72nd in the world, 117 lines per 100 persons (2012).

Telephone system: modernized and capable of satisfying all requests for telecommunication service; digitized and highly automated system; trunk services are carried by fiber-optic cable and digital microwave radio relay; a program for fiber-optic subscriber connections was initiated in 1996; competition among mobile-network service providers has led to a sharp increase in the use of mobile phones since 2000 and a decrease in the number of fixed-line connections; fiber-optic cable connections with all neighboring countries; the international switch is in Budapest (2011).

* Satellite earth stations: 2 Intelsat (Atlantic Ocean and Indian Ocean regions), 1 Inmarsat, 1 Very Small Aperture Terminal (VSAT) (2011).

== Internet ==
Top-level domain: .hu

Internet users:

- 7.2 million users, 47th in the world; 72% of the population, 45th in the world (2012);
- 6.2 million users, 41st in the world (2009).

Internet hosts: 3.1 million hosts, 33rd in the world (2012).

IPv4: 5.5 million addresses allocated, 0.1% of the world total, 550.9 addresses per 1000 people (2012).

=== Fixed broadband ===
Fixed broadband: 2.3 million subscriptions, 36th in the world; 22.9% of the population, 41st in the world (2012).

ADSL appeared in Hungary in 2001 and ADSL2+ in late 2005.

The main broadband Internet providers are: Magyar Telekom (formerly T-Com/T-Online/Matáv), One Hungary (formerly Vodafone Hungary), Invitel, Externet, Emitel, Monortel, Pantel, TVnet, TvNetWork, VIVAnet, and Digi. Smaller providers, such as TigerNet or HDSnet, are mainly available in the city of Budapest.

=== Mobile broadband ===
Wireless broadband: 2.3 million subscriptions, 61st in the world; 23.1% of the population, 64th in the world (2012).

The mobile broadband providers include:

Yettel:

- Services: LTE/HSDPA/3G/EDGE/GPRS/GSM solutions to use your mobile phone to connect to the Internet.
- Technologies: WCDMA (Wideband Code Division Multiple Access or "UMTS"), CDMA 2000, CDMA TDD.
- Availability: LTE/3G available in most parts of the country. (LTE800, LTE1800)

Magyar Telekom:

- Services: LTE/GSM/EDGE/3G/HSDPA
- Availability: LTE/3G service available in most parts of the country. (LTE800, LTE1800)

One Hungary:

- Services: LTE/3G/GPRS solutions to use your mobile phone to connect to the Internet.
- Availability: 3G service available in many towns. LTE service available in major cities.

DIGI Mobile Hungary:

- Services: LTE solutions to use your mobile phone to connect to the Internet.
- Availability: 2G service available in many towns. LTE service available in major cities.

=== Internet censorship and surveillance ===
There is no OpenNet Initiative (ONI) country profile, but Hungary is shown as no evidence of filtering in all areas (political, social, conflict/security, and Internet tools) on the ONI global Internet filtering maps.

There are no reports that the government monitors e-mail or Internet chat rooms. Individuals and groups engage in the peaceful expression of views via the Internet, including by e-mail.

On 15 July 2014, at the request of Hungary's National Tax and Customs Authority, the National Media and Infocommunications Authority temporarily blocked access to seven gambling-related sites for three months. An up-to-date list of blocked gambling related sites is published by the Tax and Customs Authority.

The constitution and law provide for freedom of speech and of the press, and prohibit arbitrary interference with privacy, family, home, or correspondence. However the government not always respects these prohibitions in practice.

European Commissioner Kroes, NGOs, and the foreign press raised concerns that provisions of the new media laws requiring balanced reporting and registration of media outlets lacked clear limits and could be interpreted to include blogs. The government and the National Media and Infocommunication Authority (NMHH) argued that, in practice, blogs would be exempt from these requirements on the basis that they are not considered "business endeavors."

=== Internet tax and protests ===
In October 2014, thousands of Hungarians protested in Budapest against a planned new tax on Internet data transfers, which they said would not only increase the tax burden but would also curb fundamental democratic rights and freedoms. The draft tax bill contains a provision for Internet providers to pay a tax of 150 forints (60 U.S. cents) per gigabyte of data traffic, though it would also let companies offset corporate income tax against the new levy On 29 October, 2014 an estimated 100,000 Hungarians marched in protest of the tax on internet data Internet developer Zsolt Várady addressed the marchers, saying "The internet tax is a symbol of the government's despotism...We not only need to defeat the tax, we need to believe that we are capable of criticising and influencing the state." One-time socialist party member and critic of the tax, Balázs Gulyás who inspired the week of growing protests from Facebook said, "This is limiting free access to the Internet and information...It is an attempt to create a digital iron curtain around Hungary." Government representative Zoltán Kovács denied the tax was meant to curtail debate not controlled by the ruling Fidesz party

== See also ==
- Economy of Hungary
- Media of Hungary
