= Climate of Hungary =

Hungary map of Köppen climate classification.

The climate of Hungary is determined by its position. Hungary is in the eastern part of Central Europe, roughly equidistant from the Equator and the North Pole, more than 1,000 kilometres (600 mi) from both and about 1,000 kilometres from the Atlantic Ocean.

Its climate is the result of environmental changes during the Holocene Era and the interaction of two major climate systems: the continental climate and the oceanic climate. The influence of both of these systems is felt across the country at different times, and the weather changes frequently. Hungary has a temperate seasonal climate.

In 2007, Hungary was ranked sixth in an environmental protection index by Globalwatch and Climate Action Network.

== Influencing factors ==
The climate of Hungary is influenced by its distance from the Atlantic and the prevailing westerly winds. The continental character of the Hungarian climate much less extreme than in Eastern Europe. The depressions of the temperate zone follow the path of the westerly winds and bring heavy rains to the country.

The country's situation within the geographical region of the Carpathian Basin is also important. The surrounding mountain ranges modify the impact of winds and other climatic forces progressing toward the country.

Hungary's climate is influenced by two more or less permanent action centers of the temperate zone: the Icelandic Low and the Azores High. Depressions originating from the Iceland zone travel across the country, bringing cool weather and rain. When the Azores High gains ascendancy, the weather is bright and dry, in both winter and summer. Besides the permanent ones, there is an important seasonal action centre too: the Siberian High, which exerts its influence from time to time in winter, when the cold air masses over Siberia and Eastern Europe are driven across the Carpathian Mountains and settle for some time over the Carpathian Basin.

== Sunshine ==
From north to south, Hungary differs by only about 3 degrees of latitude. The seasonal variance in the angle of incidence of the Sun's rays is, therefore, about 3°. The annual total insolation of the surface of the country varies between 80 and 110 kcal/cm^{2} (330 and 460 kJ/cm^{2}; 520 and 710 kcal/sq in).

The seasonal distribution of sunshine varies between 70 kcal/cm^{2} (290 kJ/cm^{2}; 450 kcal/sq in) in summer and 20 kcal/cm^{2} (84 kJ/cm^{2}; 130 kcal/sq in) in winter.

It varies a little by longitude, from 60 to 70 kcal/cm^{2} (250 to 290 kJ/cm^{2}; 390 to 450 kcal/sq in) in the west to 100 to 110 kcal/cm^{2} (420 to 460 kJ/cm^{2}; 650 to 710 kcal/sq in) in the south-east.

The average hours of sunshine vary between 1,700 and 2,100 a year (at Sopron, 1,700 hours, in Szeged, 2,068 hours). The maxima at both are in July.

The annual average of completely overcast days varies between 70 and 190. The actual hours of sunshine – that is, any sunshine on a day – reaches almost half of that possible – 46%. (London, by comparison, has about 33 percent a year).

== Temperature ==
Even in Hungary, the temperature is warmer than, for example, neighbouring Austria because of the southward flow over the Alps of the Gulf Stream. This aberration or anomaly can be as much as 2.5 °C (4.5 °F). Towards the east, this gradually diminishes.

The average temperature in Hungary is 8 to 11 °C (46 to 52 °F). The difference between the north and the south is only 3 °C (5.4 °F) because of the relatively small distance between the south and north. For instance, the mean temperature in Southern England, the Massif Central in France, and Switzerland is the same, but in Hungary, there are much greater extremes from summer to winter.

The highest temperature to have ever been recorded in Hungary was 42.0 °C (107.6 °F) at Szécsény on June 30 2026. The lowest temperature to have ever been recorded in Hungary was −35.0 °C (−31.0 °F) at Görömbölytapolca on 16 February 1940.

=== Agronomy ===
The heat total during Hungary's growing season rises above 3,000 °C (5,430 °F) over much of the country, which is very favorable for agriculture in Hungary, but frosts in May can present a serious hazard to crops.

In its annual temperature range. 20 metres (66 ft) below the surface, this fluctuation ceases, and the temperature is constant at 11 °C (52 °F). The average depth of surface frosts is 25 to 35 centimetres (9.8 to 13.8 in).

Budapest lies on the boundary between hardiness zones 6 and 7.

== Wind ==
The wind exerts a strong influence on the other climatic elements thourgh its velocity, direction, and ability to mobilize air masses. At an altitude independent of the relief effect, about 4,000 m, westerly currents predominate over the country. Closer to the surface, over the greater part of the country, north-westerly winds predominate, but east of the Tisza River, northerly winds prevail. Regarding wind velocity, the mean annual value varies between 1.5 and 2.5 on the Beaufort scale (2 and 3" 5 m/s) over the whole country. The changes in atmospheric pressure are not very significant.

== Precipitation ==
The average annual precipitation across the country is 600 millimetres (24 in). The driest parts of the country are in the east; where, for example, in the Hortobágy, the annual precipitation remains below 500 millimetres (20 in). The maximum rainfall, nearly 1,000 millimetres (39 in), falls at Hungary's western borders.

As is characteristic of the continental climate, the most precipitation occurs in late spring and early summer. In the southwestern region, a second maximum occurs during October under the influence of the Mediterranean climate.

The number of rainy days is over 100 in the southwestern borderland, as well as in the area of the Mátra and Bükk mountains, but less than 80 along the middle section of the River Tisza. Low precipitation, heat, and strong evaporation make the Great Hungarian Plain very dusty in summer.

Thunderstorms and gales are common, particularly in the summer months. In winter, from the end of November to the beginning of March, precipitation falls partly in the form of snow. The snow cover varies considerably. The thinnest snow cover is found in the eastern region of the Great Plain (with the annual average being 4 centimetres (1.6 in)). Often, winter corn remains open to the elements when farmers do not expect any hard frost.

== Humidity ==
In Hungary, the air humidity is higher in summer than in winter. The annual average water vapor content is 7.4 g/m^{3} (0.0074 oz/cu ft) at a hydrostatic pressure of 7.3 millimetres (0.29 in). The highest relative water vapor content (over 75%) is found in the western borderland.

== Terrain ==
The surface of the country and the hydrology of Hungary also affect the climate. Their general influence on the macroclimate is negligible, however they affect the meso- and microclimates. A good example is the microclimate of the surroundings of the Great Lakes, especially that of Lake Balaton. But bare sandy surfaces, hills (of calcium carbonate such as dolomite) such as the hills surrounding Buda, and even the type of vegetation also have an influence on the meso- and microclimates.

The relief energy of Hungary, that is, the differences in altitude in the country (in other words, its hydroelectric potential), is relatively small. Still, the 400 to 900 metres (1,300 to 3,000 ft) difference in altitude between the Great Hungarian Plain and the shallow northern mountain ranges is enough to produce clear differences in the climates of the two areas.

== Examples ==
Climate data for Budapest, 1991–2020
Month	Jan	Feb	Mar	Apr	May	Jun	Jul	Aug	Sep	Oct	Nov	Dec	Year
Record high °C (°F)	18.1 (64.6)	19.7 (67.5)	25.4 (77.7)	30.2 (86.4)	34.0 (93.2)	39.5 (103.1)	40.7 (105.3)	39.4 (102.9)	35.2 (95.4)	30.8 (87.4)	22.6 (72.7)	19.3 (66.7)	40.7 (105.3)
Mean daily maximum °C (°F)	4.1 (39.4)	6.6 (43.9)	11.8 (53.2)	18.3 (64.9)	22.9 (73.2)	26.6 (79.9)	28.6 (83.5)	28.6 (83.5)	22.8 (73.0)	16.8 (62.2)	10.1 (50.2)	4.6 (40.3)	16.8 (62.2)
Daily mean °C (°F)	1.4 (34.5)	3.4 (38.1)	7.7 (45.9)	13.3 (55.9)	17.7 (63.9)	21.4 (70.5)	23.3 (73.9)	23.2 (73.8)	18.0 (64.4)	12.7 (54.9)	7.2 (45.0)	2.2 (36.0)	12.6 (54.7)
Mean daily minimum °C (°F)	−1.2 (29.8)	0.1 (32.2)	3.6 (38.5)	8.3 (46.9)	12.6 (54.7)	16.2 (61.2)	18.0 (64.4)	17.7 (63.9)	13.2 (55.8)	8.6 (47.5)	4.3 (39.7)	−0.2 (31.6)	8.4 (47.1)
Record low °C (°F)	−25.6 (−14.1)	−23.4 (−10.1)	−15.1 (4.8)	−4.6 (23.7)	−1.6 (29.1)	3.0 (37.4)	5.9 (42.6)	5.0 (41.0)	−3.1 (26.4)	−9.5 (14.9)	−16.4 (2.5)	−20.8 (−5.4)	−25.6 (−14.1)
Average precipitation mm (inches)	37 (1.5)	29 (1.1)	30 (1.2)	42 (1.7)	62 (2.4)	63 (2.5)	45 (1.8)	49 (1.9)	40 (1.6)	39 (1.5)	53 (2.1)	43 (1.7)	532 (20.9)
Average precipitation days	7.3	6.1	6.4	6.6	8.6	8.7	7.2	6.9	5.9	5.3	7.8	7.2	84
Average relative humidity (%)	79	74	66	59	61	61	59	61	67	72	78	80	68.1
Mean monthly sunshine hours	62	93	137	177	234	250	271	255	187	141	69	52	1,988
Average ultraviolet index	1	2	3	5	6	7	7	6	4	3	1	1	4
Source: Average temperatures 1991-2020: OMSZ - Hungarian Meteorological Service.

Climate data for Debrecen, 1991–2020
Month	Jan	Feb	Mar	Apr	May	Jun	Jul	Aug	Sep	Oct	Nov	Dec	Year
Record high °C (°F)	15.4 (59.7)	19.0 (66.2)	26.4 (79.5)	33.6 (92.5)	33.4 (92.1)	37.4 (99.3)	38.5 (101.3)	39.2 (102.6)	36.4 (97.5)	29.5 (85.1)	25.5 (77.9)	17.4 (63.3)	39.2 (102.6)
Mean daily maximum °C (°F)	2.3 (36.1)	5.0 (41.0)	10.9 (51.6)	17.7 (63.9)	22.5 (72.5)	26.0 (78.8)	27.8 (82.0)	28.1 (82.6)	22.6 (72.7)	16.6 (61.9)	9.8 (49.6)	3.2 (37.8)	16.0 (60.8)
Daily mean °C (°F)	−0.8 (30.6)	0.9 (33.6)	5.8 (42.4)	11.9 (53.4)	16.8 (62.2)	20.3 (68.5)	21.9 (71.4)	21.8 (71.2)	16.5 (61.7)	11.0 (51.8)	5.5 (41.9)	0.4 (32.7)	11.0 (51.8)
Mean daily minimum °C (°F)	−3.6 (25.5)	−2.7 (27.1)	1.2 (34.2)	6.1 (43.0)	10.8 (51.4)	14.6 (58.3)	16.0 (60.8)	15.7 (60.3)	11.2 (52.2)	6.2 (43.2)	2.1 (35.8)	−2.2 (28.0)	6.3 (43.3)
Record low °C (°F)	−30.2 (−22.4)	−26.0 (−14.8)	−17.8 (0.0)	−7.1 (19.2)	−3.0 (26.6)	−0.4 (31.3)	5.2 (41.4)	2.7 (36.9)	−2.9 (26.8)	−14.9 (5.2)	−19.0 (−2.2)	−28.0 (−18.4)	−30.2 (−22.4)
Average precipitation mm (inches)	24.3 (0.96)	32.2 (1.27)	30.0 (1.18)	45.1 (1.78)	59.3 (2.33)	66.8 (2.63)	67.7 (2.67)	46.4 (1.83)	47.3 (1.86)	41.1 (1.62)	40.5 (1.59)	42.0 (1.65)	542.7 (21.37)
Average precipitation days (≥ 1.0 mm)	6.1	6.6	6.1	6.8	8.4	8.2	7.6	6.0	6.6	6.2	6.9	7.1	82.6
Average relative humidity (%)	84.4	78.8	68.6	62.2	65.1	66.5	65.9	64.2	69.7	77.0	83.7	85.5	72.6
Mean monthly sunshine hours	57.6	85.0	146.8	190.3	251.4	266.4	295.3	274.3	201.7	155.1	72.2	47.0	2,043.1
Source: HMS

Climate data for Szeged (1971–2000)
Month	Jan	Feb	Mar	Apr	May	Jun	Jul	Aug	Sep	Oct	Nov	Dec	Year
Mean daily maximum °C (°F)	2.8 (37.0)	5.7 (42.3)	11.6 (52.9)	16.9 (62.4)	22.4 (72.3)	25.5 (77.9)	27.7 (81.9)	27.6 (81.7)	23.3 (73.9)	17.2 (63.0)	8.9 (48.0)	4.1 (39.4)	16.1 (61.1)
Daily mean °C (°F)	−0.8 (30.6)	1.2 (34.2)	5.9 (42.6)	10.8 (51.4)	16.3 (61.3)	19.2 (66.6)	20.8 (69.4)	20.8 (69.4)	16.4 (61.5)	11.0 (51.8)	4.7 (40.5)	0.9 (33.6)	10.6 (51.1)
Mean daily minimum °C (°F)	−3.8 (25.2)	−2.6 (27.3)	0.5 (32.9)	5.2 (41.4)	10.3 (50.5)	13.0 (55.4)	14.3 (57.7)	14.0 (57.2)	10.3 (50.5)	5.6 (42.1)	1.2 (34.2)	−2.0 (28.4)	5.5 (41.9)
Average precipitation mm (inches)	24 (0.9)	23 (0.9)	25 (1.0)	40 (1.6)	51 (2.0)	68 (2.7)	53 (2.1)	56 (2.2)	37 (1.5)	35 (1.4)	38 (1.5)	39 (1.5)	489 (19.3)
Mean monthly sunshine hours	59	94	143	173	234	252	278	263	199	153	77	53	1,978
Source: Hungarian Meteorological Service

Climate data for Miskolc (1961-1990 normals)
Month	Jan	Feb	Mar	Apr	May	Jun	Jul	Aug	Sep	Oct	Nov	Dec	Year
Mean daily maximum °C (°F)	0.0 (32.0)	3.7 (38.7)	10.1 (50.2)	16.7 (62.1)	21.6 (70.9)	24.5 (76.1)	26.5 (79.7)	25.9 (78.6)	22.0 (71.6)	15.8 (60.4)	7.4 (45.3)	1.9 (35.4)	14.7 (58.4)
Daily mean °C (°F)	−3.3 (26.1)	−0.5 (31.1)	4.4 (39.9)	10.3 (50.5)	15.2 (59.4)	18.3 (64.9)	19.9 (67.8)	19.1 (66.4)	15.2 (59.4)	9.4 (48.9)	3.7 (38.7)	−1.1 (30.0)	9.2 (48.6)
Mean daily minimum °C (°F)	−6.3 (20.7)	−3.9 (25.0)	−0.6 (30.9)	4.3 (39.7)	9.0 (48.2)	12.3 (54.1)	13.6 (56.5)	13.0 (55.4)	9.5 (49.1)	4.5 (40.1)	0.7 (33.3)	−3.7 (25.3)	4.4 (39.9)
Average precipitation mm (inches)	27 (1.1)	28 (1.1)	32 (1.3)	40 (1.6)	65 (2.6)	83 (3.3)	60 (2.4)	65 (2.6)	41 (1.6)	34 (1.3)	43 (1.7)	36 (1.4)	554 (22)
Average precipitation days	5	6	6	7	9	10	8	7	5	5	7	6	81
Average relative humidity (%)	87	83	75	68	71	71	70	73	76	80	86	88	77
Average dew point °C (°F)	−5.3 (22.5)	−3.1 (26.4)	−0.1 (31.8)	4.1 (39.4)	9.4 (48.9)	12.5 (54.5)	13.7 (56.7)	13.5 (56.3)	10.5 (50.9)	5.8 (42.4)	1.4 (34.5)	−2.9 (26.8)	5.0 (40.9)
Mean monthly sunshine hours	40.8	69.5	128.3	177.2	224	224.2	254.5	236.4	180.8	141.6	53.2	36	1,766.5
Source: NCEI

Climate data for Győr (1971–2000)
Month	Jan	Feb	Mar	Apr	May	Jun	Jul	Aug	Sep	Oct	Nov	Dec	Year
Mean daily maximum °C (°F)	2.6 (36.7)	5.3 (41.5)	10.7 (51.3)	16.0 (60.8)	21.5 (70.7)	24.3 (75.7)	26.6 (79.9)	26.3 (79.3)	21.5 (70.7)	15.6 (60.1)	8.0 (46.4)	3.9 (39.0)	15.2 (59.4)
Daily mean °C (°F)	−0.5 (31.1)	1.3 (34.3)	5.5 (41.9)	10.4 (50.7)	15.7 (60.3)	18.6 (65.5)	20.4 (68.7)	19.9 (67.8)	15.5 (59.9)	10.2 (50.4)	4.6 (40.3)	1.1 (34.0)	10.2 (50.4)
Mean daily minimum °C (°F)	−3.3 (26.1)	−1.9 (28.6)	1.6 (34.9)	5.4 (41.7)	10.1 (50.2)	13.1 (55.6)	14.7 (58.5)	14.4 (57.9)	10.8 (51.4)	6.0 (42.8)	1.6 (34.9)	−1.4 (29.5)	5.9 (42.6)
Average precipitation mm (inches)	32 (1.3)	33 (1.3)	28 (1.1)	38 (1.5)	55 (2.2)	64 (2.5)	53 (2.1)	65 (2.6)	38 (1.5)	35 (1.4)	53 (2.1)	38 (1.5)	532 (21.1)
Average precipitation days (≥ 1.0 mm)	7	6	7	7	8	9	7	7	6	5	8	7	84
Mean monthly sunshine hours	60	97	138	189	247	250	268	259	188	143	73	51	1,963
Source 1: Meteorological Service of Hungary
Source 2: HKO (precipitation, 1961–1990)

Climate data for Pécs (1961-1990 normals)
Month	Jan	Feb	Mar	Apr	May	Jun	Jul	Aug	Sep	Oct	Nov	Dec	Year
Mean daily maximum °C (°F)	1.6 (34.9)	4.8 (40.6)	10.3 (50.5)	16.0 (60.8)	20.9 (69.6)	24.0 (75.2)	26.3 (79.3)	25.9 (78.6)	22.3 (72.1)	16.6 (61.9)	8.8 (47.8)	3.4 (38.1)	15.1 (59.1)
Daily mean °C (°F)	−1.4 (29.5)	1.3 (34.3)	5.6 (42.1)	10.7 (51.3)	15.5 (59.9)	18.6 (65.5)	20.5 (68.9)	20.1 (68.2)	16.6 (61.9)	11.3 (52.3)	5.1 (41.2)	0.6 (33.1)	10.4 (50.7)
Mean daily minimum °C (°F)	−4.0 (24.8)	−1.7 (28.9)	1.6 (34.9)	6.0 (42.8)	10.5 (50.9)	13.6 (56.5)	15.0 (59.0)	14.7 (58.5)	11.7 (53.1)	7.0 (44.6)	2.2 (36.0)	−1.7 (28.9)	6.2 (43.2)
Average precipitation mm (inches)	39 (1.5)	32 (1.3)	38 (1.5)	55 (2.2)	63 (2.5)	84 (3.3)	61 (2.4)	63 (2.5)	47 (1.9)	37 (1.5)	56 (2.2)	44 (1.7)	619 (24.5)
Average precipitation days (≥ 1.0 mm)	7	6	7	8	9	10	7	7	6	6	8	8	89
Average relative humidity (%)	84	79	72	66	67	68	65	67	70	74	82	85	73
Average dew point °C (°F)	−3.9 (25.0)	−2.1 (28.2)	0.5 (32.9)	4.2 (39.6)	9.0 (48.2)	12.1 (53.8)	13.2 (55.8)	13.1 (55.6)	10.6 (51.1)	6.5 (43.7)	2.2 (36.0)	−1.8 (28.8)	5.3 (41.6)
Mean monthly sunshine hours	67.9	91.2	146.2	187.2	237	258.9	293.3	267.6	206.2	165	81.7	59.2	2,061.4
Source: NCEI

== Sources ==
- Ferenc Erdei, ed. (1968), Information Hungary, Pergamon Press, pp. 12–14
