= Prostitution in Hungary =

Prostitution in Hungary has been legalized and regulated by the government since 1999. Under the law, prostitutes are basically professionals who engage in sexual activities in exchange for money. The government allows this activity as long as they pay taxes and keep legal documents.

In 2007, the prostitution and pornography industry in Hungary was estimated by Hungary's tax authority APEH to generate $1 billion annually.

== Current situation ==
According to the law, local authorities have the power to mark zones for legal prostitution if there is profound local need. Most authorities have refused to designate these zones. These zones must be a distance away from schools or churches. Soliciting is only allowed within these tolerance zones.

Prostitutes must be at least 18 years old, possess a "entrepreneur's permit" and pay taxes.

Running brothels or providing a place for prostitution, promoting prostitution or living on the earnings of other peoples prostitution are illegal.

Three monthly STI and HIV testing is mandatory, and health certificates can be inspected by the police.

== SZEXE ==
The Sex Workers' Advocacy Association (in Hungarian: Szexmunkások Érdekvédelmi Egyesülete (SZEXE)), originally the Hungarian Prostitutes' Interest Protection Association, was founded in 2000 by a group of sex workers. It serves as a trade union and lobbying organisation to prostitutes in Hungary.

The association also provides counselings, routine health checks, legal advice, and it serves as an outreach program to which prostitutes are encouraged to turn when facing difficulties. In 2002, membership was extended to homosexual and transgender prostitutes.

Due to regulation, which mandates those engaged in prostitution to subject themselves to periodical health checks, the trade union provides such services. Most attention is focused on the diagnosis and treatment of sexually transmitted diseases (STD) such as Chlamydia, hepatitis B, HIV, syphilis, and gonorrhea.

== Sex trafficking ==
Hungary is a source, transit, and destination country for women trafficked from Romania and Ukraine to Hungary and through Hungary to the Netherlands, the United Kingdom, Denmark, Germany, Austria, Italy, Switzerland, France, and the United Arab Emirates for the purpose of commercial sexual exploitation.

Internal trafficking of women for sexual exploitation also occurs. Experts noted a significant increase in trafficking within the country, mostly women from eastern Hungary trafficked to Budapest and areas along the Austrian border. Romani women and girls who grow up in Hungarian orphanages are highly vulnerable to internal sex trafficking.

According to government officials and NGOs, the majority of traffickers are individuals or small, family-based groups. Organized crime syndicates transported many of the trafficking victims to or through the country for forced prostitution. The U.S. State Department's report on human rights in Hungary states that although Hungary does not fully comply with minimum standards for the elimination of trafficking, it does make significant efforts to do so.

The United States Department of State Office to Monitor and Combat Trafficking in Persons ranks Hungary as a 'Tier 2 Watch List' country.
