= Freedom of religion in Hungary =

Freedom of religion is recognized as a legal right in Hungary. The Fundamental Law of Hungary establishes the country as being founded on Christian values but guarantees the right to freedom of religion and freedom from religious discrimination. The history of religious freedom in Hungary has varied, with freedom of religion first recognized in 1919 before being restricted by Communist rule in the mid-20th century. Religious rights were restored following the end of Communism in Hungary, but the government under Viktor Orbán has been criticized for its restriction of religious freedoms.

In 2023, the country was scored 3 out of 4 for religious freedom.

== History ==
Hungary was established as a Christian nation when Stephen I was crowned king by the pope in the year 1000. During the Reformation in the 16th century, Hungary was split primarily between Catholics and Calvinists. Several other Christian denominations and a significant Jewish population developed over the following centuries. As a result, Hungary developed a culture of religious pluralism, and in 1895, a law was passed guaranteeing the right to freedom of religion in Hungary. Under this law, public worship was regulated and established churches were recognized by the government.

The Hungarian Communist Party briefly took control of the country in 1919 and established the Hungarian Soviet Republic with a policy of state atheism. This government fell before its religious policies could be implemented, and backlash to Communist rule resulted in a period of Christian nationalism in Hungary. The Hungarian Socialist Workers' Party took power in 1949, and with the backing of the Soviet Union, religious practice was restricted in Hungary. Following the Hungarian Revolution of 1956, restrictions on religion were loosened despite a continuing decline in the religious population.

Communist rule ended in 1989, and freedom of religion was recognized as a constitutional right under the new government. The Constitution of Hungary was replaced with the new Fundamental Law of 2011, which codified a right to freedom of religion, and Act C of 2011 was passed to govern religion in Hungary. Under Prime Minister Viktor Orbán, the government has emphasized the role of Christianity in Hungary, and the Hungarian government has been criticized for restricting religious rights and giving preferential treatment to some religious organizations.

== Legal status ==
=== Fundamental Law of Hungary ===
The Fundamental Law of Hungary took effect in 2012 as the constitution of Hungary. This law establishes the importance of Christianity in Hungarian government while also recognizing the right to freedom of religion. The constitution establishes a separation of church and state and authorizes the regulation of churches through a cardinal act. Citizens have the right to proclaim and teach their religious beliefs through religious acts and ceremonies or to refrain from proclaiming a religion. The constitution also guarantees the right to be free from discrimination on the basis of religion. The preamble of the Constitution states that Hungary was founded as part of Christian Europe and that Christianity has a role in preserving nationhood.

The Hungarian Civil Liberties Union has challenged Hungary's unequal treatment of religious organizations, but the Constitutional Court has ruled that freedom of religion does not entail a right to equal support from the government. The Constitution also prohibits hate speech on the basis of religion. In 2020, the Constitution was amended to state that children are to be educated in the values of Christian culture.

=== Act C of 2011 ===
Since it came into effect in 2012, religious law in Hungary has been directed by Act C of 2011 on the Right to Freedom of Conscience and Religion, and on the Legal Status of Churches, Religious Denominations and Religious Communities. This law reiterates the right to freedom of religion in various aspects of Hungarian society and the right to be free from religious discrimination. It also describes the legal system under which religious organizations operate and how they are recognized under the law. Students in the first eight years of public school are required to receive education in ethics. Parents and students are given the option of choosing between religious ethics or secular ethics. Any religious organization may operate a religious school and receive government subsidies based on the number of students enrolled. Religious rights are also extended to people in prison and military servicemembers.

Act C of 2011 has been criticized for enabling discriminatory treatment against religious organizations. Upon taking effect, the law revoked legal status from hundreds of religious organizations. In 2014, the European Court of Human Rights found that this law violated the rights to freedom of religion and freedom of association. Under an amendment to the law in 2018, Hungary recognizes four categories of religious organizations with various privileges. The government negotiates individually with each religious organization to determine subsidies in return for public service and other religious activities. The government is also authorized to dissolve a religious organization if its activities are found to be illegal, though the government does not have the power to control or monitor religious organizations.

=== Government of Viktor Orbán ===
Since Viktor Orbán's government under the Fidesz party was formed in 2010, it has been accused of religious discrimination and preferential treatment of certain religious groups. Fidesz has been accused of using state media to spread xenophobic messaging, including messaging that targets Jewish and Muslim populations. The Hungarian government has been criticized for passing legislation based on religious ideas and outsourcing government duties and public services to churches.

The government of Prime Minister Viktor Orbán has been criticized as antisemitic, though Orbán disputes these claims. Orbán has also been criticized for Islamophobia. The government under Orbán has portrayed Muslim refugees as a threat to Hungary. The Organization of Muslims in Hungary has criticized the government for allotting it insufficient cemetery space, for delaying the restoration of the Yakovalı Hasan Paşa Mosque, and for providing Muslims in prison with pork despite the legal right to an alternative meal.

== Societal status ==
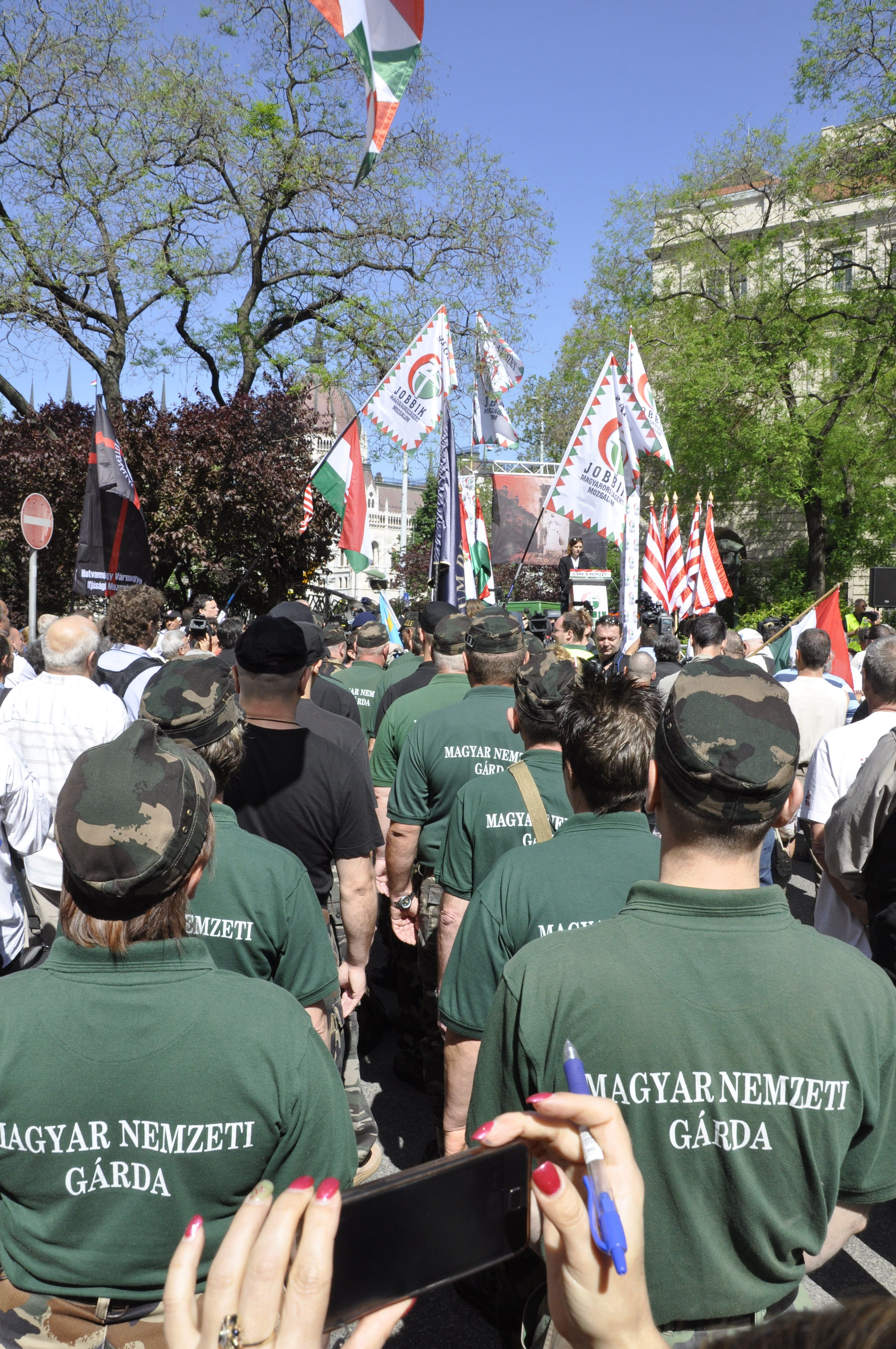
The New Hungarian Guard protests the World Jewish Congress in Budapest. 2013.

Antisemitism in Hungary has been found to be prevalent. A 2019 poll found that 36% of Hungarians believe there to be a "secret Jewish network" controlling politics and the economy and that 15% wish for Jews to leave the country. A 2019 poll of Hungarian Jews found that 77% considered antisemitism a major problem in Hungary and that 35% had experienced harassment in the five years preceding the poll. The Magyar Gárda was far-right organization that targeted minorities between 2007 and 2009, targeting Jews specifically. During his visit to Hungary in 2021, Pope Francis identified antisemitism as a major problem in the country.

Due to Hungary's limited Muslim population, Islamophobia was not a major issue in Hungary before 2015. Following the influx of refugees into Europe from Islamic countries in 2015, Islamophobic messaging increased significantly. Muslims have been found to experience verbal harassment in public, with women and girls wearing a hijab being targeted in particular.

== See also ==
- History of Christianity in Hungary
- History of the Jews in Hungary
- Human rights in Hungary
- Islam in Hungary
- Politics of Hungary
- Religion in Hungary
