= Ditrău =

Ditrău Ditró
- Commune
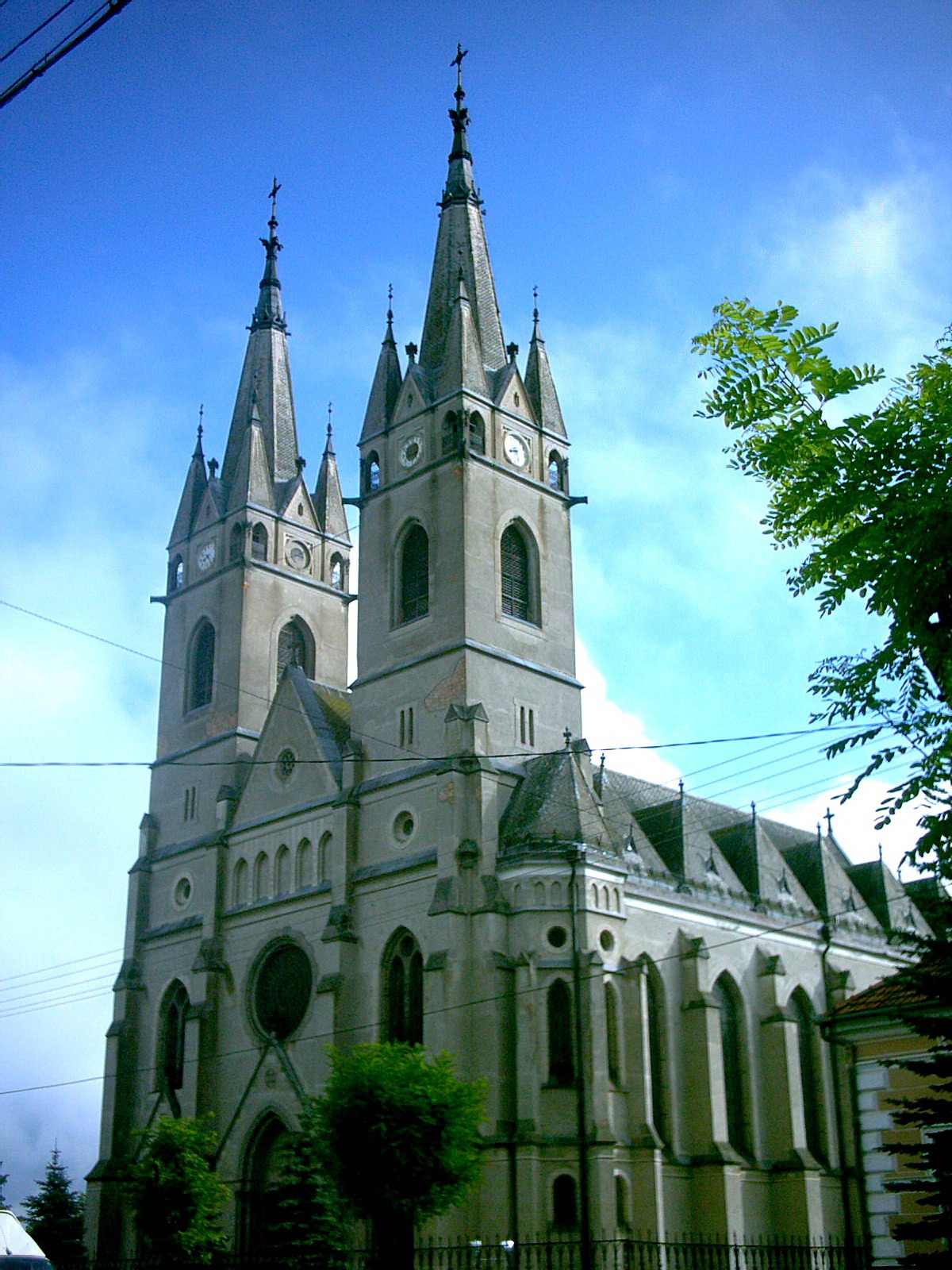
- Church of the Sacred Heart of Jesus (the "Big Church") in Ditrău

- Coat of arms

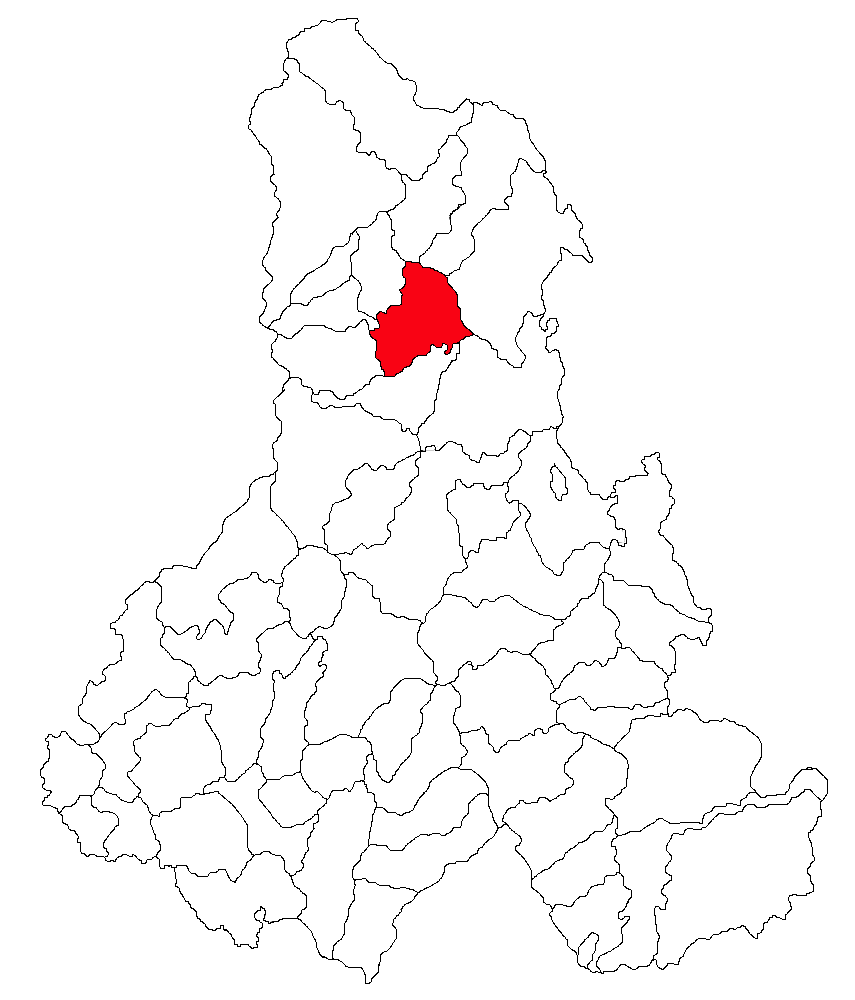
- Location in Harghita County

- Location in Romania
- Coordinates: 46°49′N 25°31′E
- Country: Romania
- County: Harghita

Government
  - Mayor (2020–2024): Elemér Puskás (UDMR)
- Area: 114.99 km^{2} (44.40 sq mi)
- Elevation: 714 m (2,343 ft)
- Population (2021-12-01): 5,284
  - Density: 45.95/km^{2} (119.0/sq mi)
- Time zone: UTC+02:00 (EET)
  - Summer (DST): UTC+03:00 (EEST)
- Postal code: 537090
- Area code: +(40) 266
- Vehicle reg.: HR

Ditrău (Romanian: [diˈtrəw]; Hungarian: Ditró or Gyergyóditró [ˈ(ɟɛrɟoː)ditroː]) is a commune in Harghita County, Transylvania, Romania. It is composed of three villages: Ditrău, Jolotca (Orotva), and Țengheler (Csengellér or Cengellér).

== Geography ==
The commune is situated between the Gurghiu and the Giurgeu mountains, 714 m (2,343 ft) above sea level, with the highest point being the Piricske height. It lies on the banks of the river Ditrău, which discharges here in the Mureș River.

Ditrău is located in the northern part of Harghita County, 14 km (8.7 mi) north of Gheorgheni and 22 km (14 mi) south of Toplița. The county seat, Miercurea Ciuc, is 65 km (40 mi) to the south.

== History ==
Saint Catherine Church

Ditrău was first registered in 1567, as Gitró, with 26 gates. The villages belonged first to the Székely seat of Gyergyószék, which was subsequently absorbed into Csíkszék, until the administrative reform of Transylvania in 1876, when they fell within the Csík County in the Kingdom of Hungary.

After the Hungarian–Romanian War of 1919 and Treaty of Trianon of 1920, the villages became part of the Kingdom of Romania and fell within plasa Gheorgheni of Ciuc County during the interwar period. In 1940, the Second Vienna Award granted Northern Transylvania to Hungary and the villages were held by Hungary until September 1944.

After Soviet occupation, the Romanian administration returned in March 1945. Between 1952 and 1960, the commune fell within the Magyar Autonomous Region, between 1960 and 1968 the Mureș-Magyar Autonomous Region. In 1968, the region was abolished, and since then, the commune has been part of Harghita County. From January to March 2020, a xenophobic incident occurred between the local Székely population and two Sri Lankan immigrants who worked at the bakery Ditrói Pékség.

== Demographics ==
The commune has a Székely (Hungarian) majority. According to the 2002 census, it had a population of 5,480, of which 98.87% or 5,418 were Hungarians. At the 2011 census, Ditrău had 5,483 inhabitants (98.1% Hungarians), while at the 2021 census, there were 5,284 inhabitants (95.08% Hungarians).

== Economy ==
The commune was formerly known for its mining activity – the ditroit, a marble-like sodalite stone used in construction. There is a significant syenite reserve near the village.

== Transportation ==
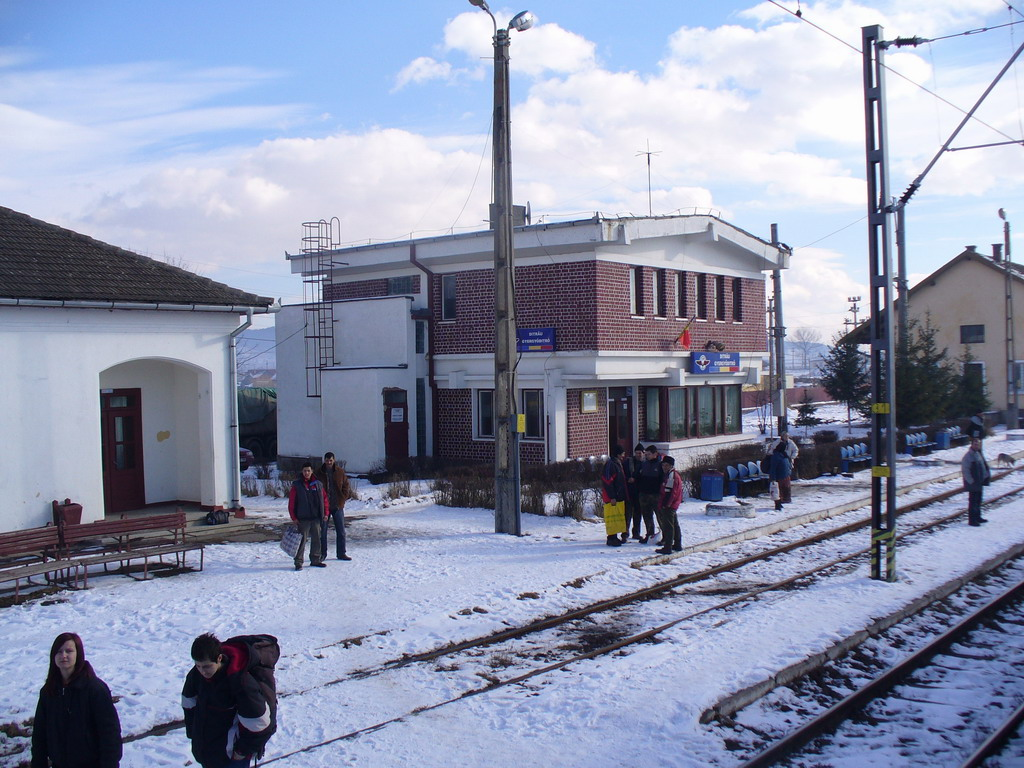
The Ditrău train station

Ditrău is crossed south to north by national road DN12 (part of European route E578), which runs from Chichiș, Covasna County to Toplița. County road DJ153C branches off to the west, ending in Reghin, Mureș County. The planned East–West Motorway will connect Ditrău to Târgu Mureș to the west and to Iași and the border with Moldova to the east.

The Ditrău train station serves the CFR Main Line 400, which runs from Brașov to Satu Mare.

== Tourist attractions ==
- The Saint Catherine Catholic church, built in 1653.
- The Church of the Sacred Heart of Jesus is 75 m (246 ft)-high church built between 1908 and 1913, which is known locally as the "big" church. This is the second highest church in this region. Its construction cost 800,000 Austro-Hungarian koronas.

== Notable natives and residents ==
- István Kovács (1911–2011), Hungarian Communist politician
- Tivadar Puskás (1844–1893), Hungarian inventor of the telephone exchange

== Twinnings ==
- Bátaszék, Hungary
- Budajenő, Hungary
- Kamut, Hungary
