= .hu =

Internet country code top-level domain for Hungary

- Introduced: 7 November 1990; 36 years ago
- TLD type: Country code top-level domain
- Status: Active
- Registry: ISZT Nonprofit Kft.
- Sponsor: Scientific Association of the Hungarian Council of Internet Service Providers (ISZT)
- Intended use: Entities connected with Hungary
- Actual use: Very popular in Hungary
- Registered domains: 978,463 (17 November 2026)
- Registration restrictions: Open to citizens and legal persons of any country, unless excluded by mandatory law; applicants from outside the EU, the Council of Europe, the EEA, EFTA and Hungary's neighbouring countries need an activity that justifies a .hu domain
- Structure: Registrations are made directly at the second level or at the third level beneath second-level public domains
- Documents: Domain Registration Policy (in Hungarian)
- Dispute policies: Alternative Dispute Resolution Forum (AVF)
- DNSSEC: Yes
- IDN: Yes (since 2004)
- Registry website: www.domain.hu

.hu is the Internet country code top-level domain (ccTLD) for Hungary. According to the records of the Internet Assigned Numbers Authority (IANA), it was created on 7 November 1990. The rules for registering names under .hu are set by the Domain Registration Policy (Domainregisztrációs Szabályzat, DRSZ) of the Scientific Association of the Hungarian Council of Internet Service Providers (Magyarországi Internet Szolgáltatók Tanácsa Tudományos Egyesület, ISZT); the domain names are kept on record by the association's subsidiary, ISZT Nonprofit Kft., acting as the Registry (Nyilvántartó), and applications are handled by registrars authorised by the Registry. On 17 November 2026 there were 978,463 registered .hu domains.

Since 18 November 2026, deleted .hu domain names no longer go to the fastest applicant; they can be applied for again in a 15-day sealed-bid auction.

== History ==
According to a 2021 report by HVG, the top-level domain had to be registered so that the Hungarian research network could join international Internet e-mail, and the code became HU because it was Hungary's standard two-letter country code. The first Hungarian domain name was sztaki.hu, registered in 1991 for the Computer and Automation Research Institute (SZTAKI) of the Hungarian Academy of Sciences. According to a 2016 article in Economx, sztaki.hu was created on 15 October 1991; the first viewable Hungarian website was bme.hu in 1993, and about 400 .hu domain names were in operation at the beginning of 1996 and more than 500 in April of that year.

The ISZT policy titled "Rules for the delegation and registration of Internet domains in the .hu public domains" (Az internetdomainek delegálásának és regisztrálásának szabályai a .hu közdomainekben) came into force on 1 March 2000 and liberalised domain registration: until then only a name that appeared in some official register of the applicant could be registered, and from that date anyone could apply for any name that was still free. Under that policy a domain name could be 2 to 24 characters long; if the applicant had no priority, the application was publicly announced for two weeks, during which an organisation whose name appeared in an official register could claim priority. Applicants could be any Hungarian natural or legal person, any unincorporated company, or the holder of a trademark registered with the Hungarian Patent Office. According to ISZT figures published by HWSW, there were 7 .hu domains in 1992 and 48 in 1993; in the year of liberalisation the number of registered addresses grew from barely ten thousand to 41,009 by the end of 2000, followed by 66,522 at the end of 2001 and 94,532 in December 2002, of which 91,392 were delegated. From January 2002 an annual maintenance fee had to be paid in addition to the earlier one-off fee.

Following a decision of the Council of Internet Service Providers, domain names containing the accented lowercase letters of the Hungarian alphabet (á, é, í, ó, ö, ő, ú, ü, ű) can be registered since 1 March 2004. The .hu zone has been signed with DNSSEC since October 2014; according to the Registry's statistics, the first DNSSEC-signed .hu domains appeared in August 2015, and there were 149,046 of them on 17 November 2026.

According to the Registry's statistics, the number of delegated .hu domains was 143,648 on 1 January 2005, 483,501 in 2010, 656,185 in 2015, 762,828 in 2020 and 873,227 in 2025; on 17 November 2026, 957,444 domains were delegated, 25,575 of them with accented characters. Since 1 January 2023 the ISZT has organised the Alternative Dispute Resolution Forum itself.

== Organisation ==
The ISZT regulates the .hu namespace under an agreement with ICANN. The association adopted the Domain Registration Policy as self-regulation under section 15/A of Act CVIII of 2001 on certain issues of electronic commerce services and information society services; it has transferred the right to keep and manage the domain records to its wholly owned subsidiary, ISZT Nonprofit Kft., while regulation and the organisation of alternative dispute resolution remain with the association. Regulatory decisions are prepared by the Registrars' Board (Regisztrátori Testület), in which every registrar may take part; its proposals are in most cases decided by the general assembly of the association.

A registrar can be any legal person registered or recorded in Hungary that meets the conditions for the activity and concludes a franchise agreement with the Registry; membership of the association is not required. The Registry has no direct relationship with domain users: the applicant concludes a domain maintenance contract with a registrar, and the registrar submits the application.

== Registration ==
=== Eligibility ===
A .hu domain name can be applied for by a citizen or legal person of any country, unless mandatory law excludes it. An applicant who is not a citizen or legal person of a member state of the European Union, the Council of Europe, the EEA or EFTA, or of a country bordering Hungary, and who has no Hungarian settlement or residence permit, may only apply if they carry out or start an economic or other activity that justifies the use of a .hu domain name, and must prove this on request. A natural person applicant must be of age, except for claims by heirs.

=== Name rules ===
A domain name can be 2 to 63 characters long and can contain the unaccented Latin lowercase letters (a–z), the Hungarian accented lowercase letters (á, é, í, ó, ö, ő, ú, ü, ű), digits and the hyphen; it cannot begin or end with a hyphen, and the third and fourth characters cannot both be hyphens. Accented (IDN) names are stored on the name servers in encoded (Punycode) form. A name that is unlawful, incites hatred or fear, or is misleading cannot be chosen, nor can any of the protected names published by the Registry. A .hu domain identical to the name of a Hungarian municipality with a local government can only be chosen by that local government, and one identical to the name of a country only by that country's official representation; this restriction does not apply under the second-level public domains. Only the applicant or domain user is responsible for the lawful choice and use of the domain name.

=== Application process ===
The application is entered in the Registry's records by the registrar chosen by the applicant. The Registry checks the data and the formal requirements, then assesses whether the name is misleading; if it sees this possibility, the applicant must submit a digitally signed Declaration of Good Faith. The domain then becomes conditionally registered and is published on the Registry's website for 8 days. If no complaint is filed against it during that time, the domain is registered; if a complaint is filed, the registration depends on the decision of the Alternative Dispute Resolution Forum. A registration can be for 1 to 10 years, and an extension of the expiry date cannot reach 11 years.

=== Second-level public domains ===
Domains can be registered directly under .hu (for example cegnev.hu) or under second-level public domains (for example cegnev.co.hu). According to the list published by the Registry, the second-level public domains are co.hu, 2000.hu, erotika.hu, jogasz.hu, sex.hu, video.hu, info.hu, agrar.hu, film.hu, konyvelo.hu, shop.hu, org.hu, bolt.hu, forum.hu, lakas.hu, suli.hu, priv.hu, casino.hu, games.hu, media.hu, szex.hu, sport.hu, city.hu, hotel.hu, news.hu, tozsde.hu, tm.hu, erotica.hu, ingatlan.hu, reklam.hu and utazas.hu. Under tm.hu only the applicant's own trademark can be chosen; the other public domains have no such restriction. Names can be registered under gov.hu according to separate rules.

=== WHOIS ===
For registered, conditionally registered and pre-deletion parked domains, the Registry's website publicly shows, among other things, the status of the domain, its name servers, the dates of registration and expiry, the registrar, and whether the domain is on the auction announcement list. The name, telephone number and e-mail address of the domain user and of the administrative contact are only published if they contain no personal data.

== Expiry, deletion and auction ==
=== Before deletion ===
If the domain maintenance contract ends – typically because the renewal fee has not been paid – and no registrar records within 30 days that it has concluded a new contract with the domain user, the Registry withdraws the domain. This is followed by a 30-day grace period, during which the domain is on the public list of domains parked before deletion; only the former domain user, their heir or the actual user defined in the policy can apply for it or have it restored, by paying a one-off fee and one year's maintenance fee. If this does not happen either, the domain is deleted.

=== Domain auction ===
Previously, the registration of a deleted domain name was often decided by which application reached the Registry first (domain drop catching). Under the rules in force since 18 November 2026, deleted domain names – with a few exceptions – are automatically placed on the auction announcement list for 15 days, and if several people apply for the same name, the highest valid bid decides. A domain is not auctioned if applying for it in an auction is excluded by law, by a final and enforceable decision of a court, authority or notary, or by a decision of the Alternative Dispute Resolution Forum, nor if it is subject to a grace period after deletion. The former domain user has no priority in the auction.

Anyone eligible to apply for a .hu domain can take part. The application has to be submitted to a registrar that accepts auction applications (registrars are not obliged to), and the applicant then bids on the Auction Portal through a unique link received from the Registry. The procedure is an electronic, sealed-bid procedure: bids are made in Hungarian forints, in any whole-forint amount above the minimum bid published by the Registry, and can be changed or withdrawn until the end of the announcement period; participants cannot see each other's bids, and the number and amounts of applications and bids and the identity of the applicants are not public. A bid that reaches the published deposit threshold requires a deposit of 10% of the bid, payable by card.

When the auction closes:

- if nobody applied for the domain, it becomes freely available for registration;
- if a single application was received, the applicant obtains the opportunity to register without any further payment, regardless of whether a bid was made or its amount;
- if several applications were received but nobody made a bid, the auction is repeated for another 15 days;
- otherwise the highest valid bid wins; in the case of a tie, the earlier one.

The winner obtains not the domain itself but the opportunity to register it for 15 days: the Registry assesses the application in the usual way, and within at most 15 days of the close of the auction – after the winning bid has been paid – the domain becomes conditionally registered, and after the 8-day publication it is registered if no complaint is filed. If the application is rejected, or if the winner loses the right to register in a procedure of the Alternative Dispute Resolution Forum, 90% of the amount paid is refunded and the domain is auctioned again. A winner who does not pay the winning bid on time is excluded from auctions for one year. After the procedure is closed, the Registry publishes the domain name, the amount of the winning bid and the time of closing. One of the published aims of introducing the auction system is that the additional revenue compared with ordinary registration should serve, in a transparent way, community and public-interest purposes that promote the safe use and operation of the Internet.

The first auction round started on 18 November 2026 with 278 deleted domain names; applications and bids for them can be submitted until 3 December 2026.

== Dispute resolution ==
When applying, the applicant submits to the decisions of the Alternative Dispute Resolution Forum (Alternatív Vitarendező Fórum, AVF). The AVF operates within the association, but its decisions are made by arbitrators independent of the association, the Registry and the registrars; its procedures can be started through the online Unified Complaint Management System (Egységes Panaszkezelő Rendszer, EPR). Both complaints against a conditionally registered domain and requests for review of a rejection by the Registry are decided in the AVF's domain arbitration procedure. If a decision of the AVF orders the withdrawal of a domain and the domain user does not prove within 30 days that they have gone to court, the Registry withdraws the domain.

== See also ==
- Country code top-level domain
- Internationalized domain name
- .eu
- .sk
- Cybersquatting
