= Mass media in Hungary =

Mass media in Hungary includes a variety of online, print, and broadcast formats, such as radio, television, newspapers, and magazines.

== Press freedom ==
According to numerous watchdog groups, press freedom declined significantly under prime minister Viktor Orbán. In 2010, Freedom House's press freedom index ranked Hungary’s media as the world's 40th freest. As of 2017, it had dropped to 87th freest, and Freedom House now says it is only "partly free."

== See also ==
- Cinema of Hungary
- Telecommunications in Hungary
- Open access in Hungary to scholarly communication

== Bibliography ==
- Euromedia Research Group; Mary Kelly; et al., eds. (2004). "Hungary". Media in Europe (3rd ed.). SAGE Publications. ISBN 978-0-7619-4132-3.
- "Hungary", Freedom of the Press, US: Freedom House, 2016, OCLC 57509361
