= Pink Picnic =

First public LGBTQ event in Hungary

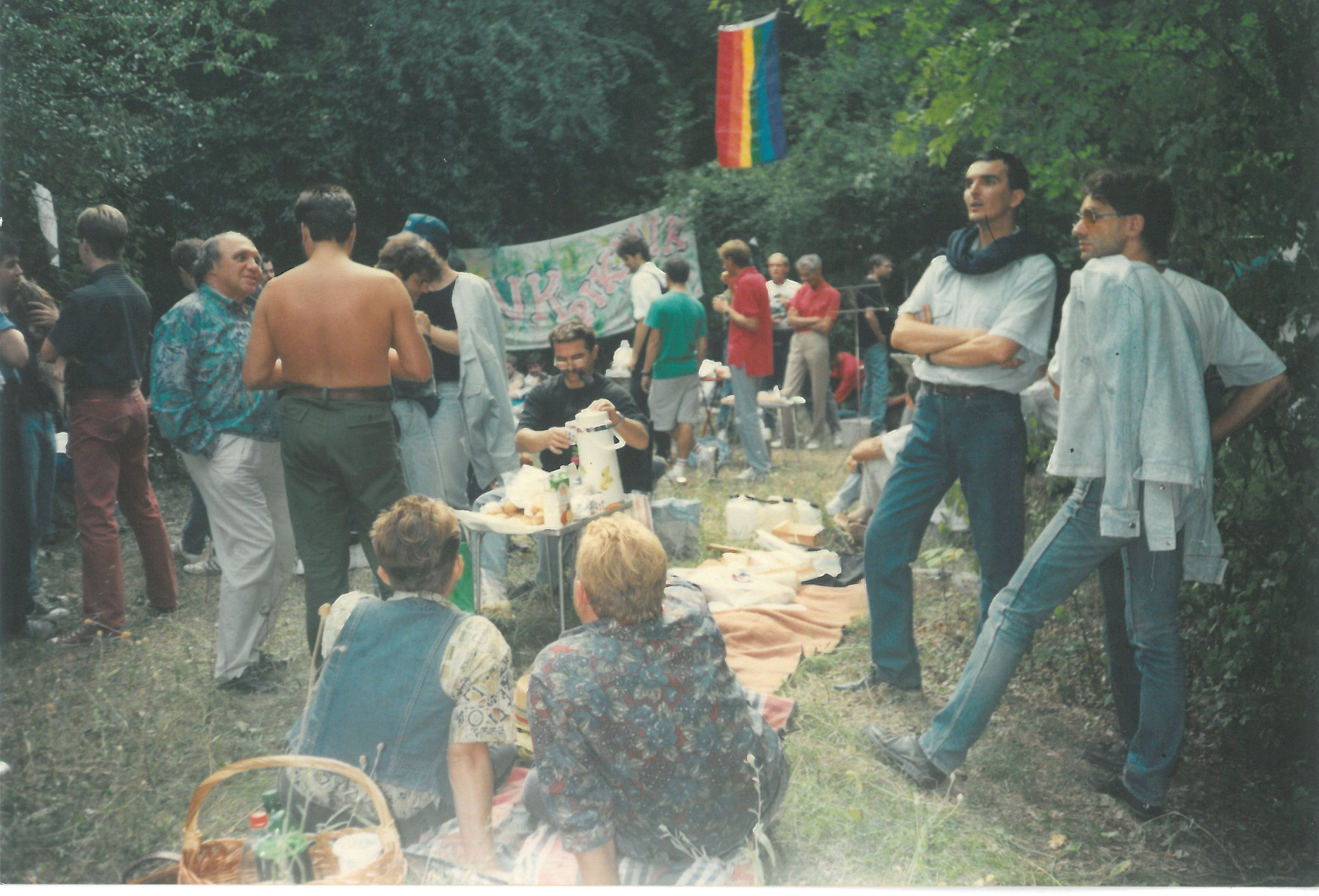
Pink picnic, 13 September 1992

The pink picnic was the first public event of the Hungarian LGBTQ movement, before the first Budapest Pride festival. The first pink picnic was held on 13 September 1992, on Hármashatár-hegyen, a wooded hill in Budapest, and was attended by 300 people. During the early 2000s it was held in different places and later became part of LGBTQ festivals.

== History ==
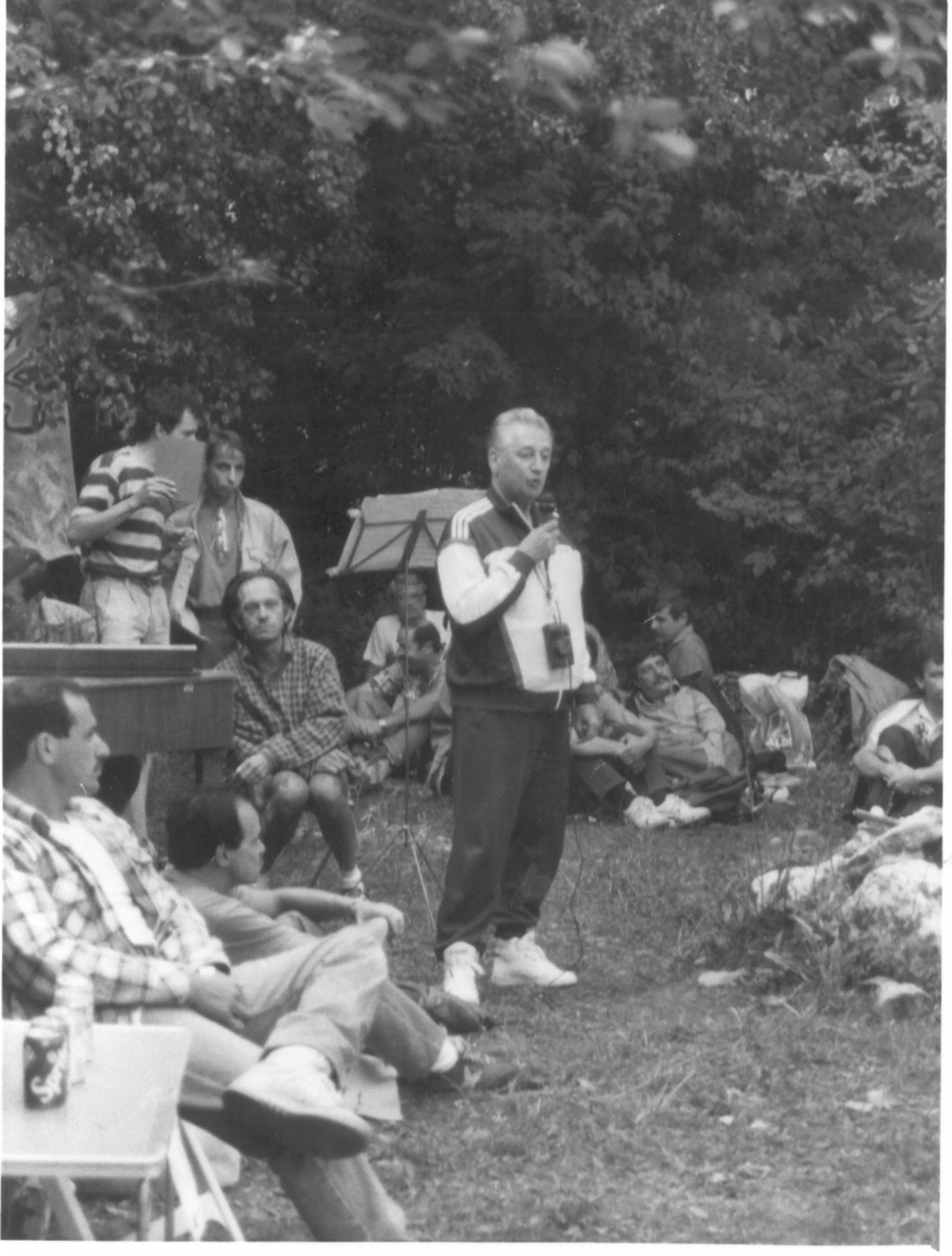
Lajos Romsauer speaking at the second pink picnic, 12 September 1993

The first pink picnic was organised jointly by the ELTE gay action group, Homérosz Egyesület, Lambda Budapest Baráti Társaság, the editors of Mások, Miskolci Homeros, the Lesbian and Gay Jewish Group Leszbikus és Gay Zsidók Csoportja and VándorMások (the Roving Others), in the afternoon and evening of 13 September 1992. It was held at Hármashatár-hegy, which was a former quarry in the Újlak Mountain. It was initiated by the newspaper Mások or "Others" where it was advertised. The newspaper later published an article about the event. The location was chosen with the help of Gosztony Zsigmond, the main tour guide of VándorMások.

At the event pink triangles glued to posts showed the way and a sheet labelled with the words "Pink Picnic" was made. This banner is now stored at the Háttér Archívum, the archives of the Háttér Society. 300 participants attended the first pink picnic. There was a renaissance and baroque chamber music concert performed by the Homo Muzsikus band, who formed for this occasion. Facilities for anonymous HIV-testing were made available. A buffet was laid on and activities were organised. Newspapers, publications and videos were sold.

== See also ==
- Human rights in Hungary
- Hungarian anti-LGBTQ law
- Hungarian LGBT Alliance
- LGBTQ history in Hungary
- LGBTQ rights in Hungary
