= LGBTQ history in Hungary =

LGBT history in Hungary, while an increasingly debated political and civil rights issue, has received very little scholarly attention. Historians of Hungary have clearly ignored sexuality, especially queer or non-normative sexuality, with the exception of prostitution. Reasons for this, to a large extent, have to do with the availability of historical sources, with no historical memoirs and testaments of Hungarian LGBT people yet found and the 'Homosexual Registry' of the police lost or destroyed after 1989.

== Early history ==
In medieval Catholic Europe "sodomy" was often used as an accusation against political and ideological enemies, and a way to disgrace dead historical figures. According to the chronicler Jan Długosz, the defeat and death in Battle of Varna to the king of Hungary and Poland Władysław III of Poland (I. Ulászló), was a divine punishment for his sinful behavior. The chronicler wrote that before the battle the king in marium libidinem proclivus - „(was) inclined to masculine desires”, later described as disgusting and being against purity. (Note: It has been noted that it can be interpreted both as „desires of men” and as „desires for men”) In modern works there are hypotheses, that "perhaps the king had a partner for a time, the several years older secretary Jan, son of Lviv castellan”.

King of Hungary Rudolf II dangled himself as a prize in a string of diplomatic negotiations for marriages, but never in fact married. During his periods of self-imposed isolation, Rudolf reportedly had affairs with his court chamberlain, Wolfgang von Rumpf, and a series of valets. One of these, Philip Lang, ruled him for years and was hated by those seeking favor with the emperor. In addition, Rudolf was known to have had a succession of affairs with women, some of whom claimed to have been impregnated by him. The emperor was the subject of a whispering campaign by his enemies in his family and the Catholic Church in the years before he was deposed. Sexual allegations may well have formed a part of the campaign against him. (Note: Trevor-Roper mentions many stories and rumours, but not those of Rudolf's homosexuality)

His contemporary Voivode and then Prince of Transylvania Sigismund Báthory married Maria Christierna of Habsburg, a niece of Rudolph II in 1595. However, the marriage was never consummated and after wedding night Sigismund sent his wife to a fortress in Kővárgara, where she was kept as prisoner. Historian László Nagy notes that Sigismund's contemporaries made no reference to his relationship with women, implying that Sigismund was homosexual.

== Austria-Hungary ==
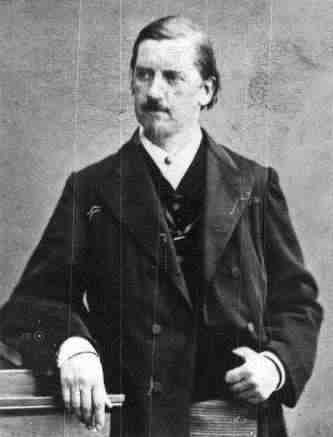
The word "homosexual" was coined by a Hungarian journalist, Karl Maria Kertbeny

Sex between men was criminalized according to the Hungarian Penal Code of 1878 (it consciously rejected Austria's approach, which criminalized both female and male homosexuality). Paragraph 241 of the Hungarian Penal Code criminalized sexual acts between men and bestiality as természetellenes fajtalanság (“unnatural fornication”) punishable by up to one year of fogház (the most lenient form of prison), while paragraph 242 declared non-consensual “crimes against nature” punishable by up to five years in prison, with potential life imprisonment if the act caused the death of the victim. The exact meaning of those terms was never concretely defined and remained open to different interpretation until its ultimate decriminalization in 1961. From the 1880s official accounts (government, police, or public health sources) intentionally avoided addressing the issue of female homosexuality.

Like in many other European places where homosexuality was unlawful at the time, criminalization did not prevent men from having sex and romantic relationships with other men. Authorities in Budapest were acutely aware of a growing queer culture in the rapidly developing and modernizing city. The Metropolitan Police in the late 1880s became one of the first police forces to create a “homosexual registry” as an integral part of Hungarian authorities’ efforts to establish a modern city. It took over two decades before the registry (along with the police itself) began to function more effectively. The exact date the registry was created is unknown, but it appears to have reached its final form in 1908, and as a consistent registry, have lasted at least until the decriminalization of homosexuality in 1961; however, there are also indications that it was actually in place until 1989. Most of the surviving info on the contents of the registry comes from the writings of 1930s doctors. In the beginning of 20th century the Budapest police found “worrisome that perversion between men is quite common in the capital,” and due to that they took responsibility for reducing and eliminating what they saw as the ill effects of same-sex sexuality and other sexual aberrations (such as blackmail, prostitution and other crimes). It appears that while the police kept recording homosexuals, it would only press charges in specific circumstances.

In 1908, the celebrated Hungarian writer Soma Guthi published Homosexual Love, as a part of his crime novel series. The novel revolved around a tragic love story between two well-situated gentlemen, and now stands as one of the few Hungarian sources from this period that directly addresses same-sex love and sexuality. Others are the publications of investigative journalists Kornél Tábori and Vladimir Székely. In A Bűnös Budapest (Sinful Budapest) (1908), the first book collecting their reportages on the “real” Budapest, Tábori and Székely devoted a chapter to male same-sex sexuality entitled A Beteg Szerelem Lovagjai, (The Knights of Sick Love). Soon after the publication of Sinful Budapest Tábori and Székely published a second book, Bűnös Szerelem (Sinful Love), entirely and explicitly dedicated to queer sexuality. It also included writing about lesbians, presented as more private and less interested in creating a metropolitan subculture than their male counterparts.

Tábori and Székely's journalism work found that there was a formally established Hungarian homosexual association by the first decade of the twentieth century. It was not officially registered, as legally it could not have been. The club was based in Budapest but soon had “offices” in a number of cities within the Hungarian Kingdom, including Arad, Nagyvárad, Kolozsvár, Pécs, and Székesfehérvár. All the offices had subscriptions to a number of queer-friendly or exclusively homosexual publications, including German publication, Der Eigene, the first gay journal in the world.

== Interwar period ==
In 1919, when the Hungarian Soviet Republic was established for short, a new judicial system of Revolutionary Tribunals was created. The Experimental Criminology Department of the Budapest Revolutionary Tribunal took a novel effort to judge crime through the eyes of a comprehensive sociomedical approach that incorporated (new at the time) psychoanalytical theories, and the surviving documents bear witness to those aims. There are two surviving case studies of the Experimental Criminology Department that explicitly deal with sexuality, one with homosexuality. Those case files present the life circumstances of the accused, implying sexuality as malleable and unfixed, and sexual history (e.g. childhood assault) as an important determinant of people's action.

After establishing the Kingdom of Hungary, the official politics on family and sexuality changed to conservatism and praise of "traditional" bourgeois family model. Still, the Kingdom was a place of the scandal of Eduardina Pallavicini and Cécile Tormay, and the following divorce trial that sparked interest of both authorities and public and showed how scandals involving high society were also always about politics, this time involving two women prominent in Horthy's political circles. On October 30, 1923, Count Rafael Zichy filed for divorce with his wife, Countess Eduardina Pallavicini (daughter of the economist Ede Pallavicini), based on charges of an “unnatural” relationship between his wife and Cecilé Tormay. This relationship caused a great scandal at the time and was widely commented on by the contemporary press to the point that the two women, to protect their image, decided to sue Count Zichy who was eventually sentenced to one and a half years in prison. It was on the personal intervention of Miklós Horthy, invested in protecting an image of the woman who promoted his regime's conservative values.

In 1926, one of the first books to be fully devoted to the modern aspects of the ‘homosexuality problem’ was published in Budapest. Its author, Dr György Pál, described homosexuality as having recurred suddenly after World War I as a mass phenomenon and as a ‘burning issue of the modern era’ that could not be ignored in Hungary either. The rapid expansion of homosexual life, the ‘great homosexual tide flooding Budapest’,13 was presented as an inherent feature of global urbanization and as a parallel development to those shaping Budapest into a world-class metropolis. In Pál's estimate, by the 1920s the number of urnings was more than 10 000 in Budapest. They had several venues to meet and interact at, including bath houses and steam baths, as well as inner-city locations, most of which would remain popular cruising areas for several decades.

A few years later, a group of journalists and police officers published a two-volume work ‘The Modern Criminality’ (A modern bűnözés) with a whole chapter was devoted to homosexuality, written by the police superintendent József Vogl. He claimed that the proportion of homosexuals used to be 0.5% of the population, and after war increased to 1% and became even higher in big cities (while claiming no data had been collected previously so it could be not exactly determined). He also presented a statistical register, compiled between 1926 and 1929, of 2,000 homosexual men living in Budapest ‘whose homosexuality is undeniable’. This contained information on their ages, marital status, occupations and whether they had criminal records. Out of them 345 already had a criminal record, with only few convicted for homosexuality, and most for petty crimes, blackmail etc. Additionally, it was made clear that the 2,000 homosexual cases did not include any prostitutes. The police had a separate file on cases of homosexual prostitution: since 1924 more than 400 men had such a police record, including 281 recidivists.

In 1933, Jenő Szántó, a practicing doctor of the Royal Hungarian Public Health Institute, published two studies: one devoted to the issue of homosexual male prostitution based on a secret police file of 1932, containing a list of 1,695 male homosexual prostitutes, and another study on homosexuality in Budapest, with published statistics of 3,425 men from police registry in terms of their occupation, marital status, religion, and criminal history. Szantó pointed out that the number of known homosexuals had almost doubled since 1929, when the József Vogl had reported on the personal data of 2,000 homosexual men living in Budapest.

Renowned neurologist and psychiatrist, Zoltán Nemes-Nagy, published a book Tragedies in Love Life in 1933. It mentioned the existence of the registry, and also contained a case study of Nemes-Nagy's homosexual patient, Mr. K. It highlights K's “peculiar” sexual nature, and, first and foremost, it does so in a publication about so-called sexual pathologies. The placement of K's story in a book, which discusses all that could go wrong with love, posits K's homosexuality as a “tragedy.”

In 1934 Nemes-Nagy devoted a whole chapter of his study of sexual pathology to ‘Homosexuals in Budapest’, as well as a chapter on ‘Homosexual Women’ and another one on ‘Punishment of Homosexuals in the Past and Today’. The ‘Homosexuals in Budapest’ chapter listed well-known homosexual meeting places, including bath houses, public beaches with separate cabins, the surroundings of public toilets and steam chambers with limited lighting. The author estimated ‘the real number’ of homosexual men in Budapest at about 15,000, most of whom would never be detected as they belonged to ‘upscale circles, carefully trying to avoid publicity and any kind of scandal leading to the police’.

== World War 2 ==
A correspondence between the State Security Center and the Minister of Defense from 1942 (recovered in the Hungarian War Archive - Hadtörténelmi Levéltár) contributes to the still very scarce historical evidence that during World War II homosexuals were also targets of state control in Hungary. The correspondence contemplates whether or not to use homosexuals as forced labour within the wartime Labour Service System and has attached a list of altogether 993 alleged homosexuals. The phrase ‘officially registered homosexuals’ is used in the correspondence, supporting the supposition that the list was based on police registry.

== Hungarian People's Republic ==
The homosexual registry survived World War II and was systematically utilized throughout the Communist years for blackmailing purposes and to keep homosexual subculture under surveillance. Compiling ‘homosexual inventories’, which provided potential blackmail victims who could be coerced into becoming police informers, was part of regular police work in urban areas and especially in Budapest. According to National Police Headquarters instructions on keeping police records from 1958 there were 13 types of criminal records, and data on homosexuals had to be kept in at least three of them: ‘Preliminary Records of Persons Suspected of Crime’; the ‘Record of Regular Criminals’ and a photo register of convicted homosexuals. Preliminary records of homosexual persons suspected of crime were kept only in the capital city; this was not required in the countryside or in smaller cities and towns. Trial records of a murder case in the late 1960s, by which time homosexuality had been decriminalized, speak of the police registry, which “helped to track down and solve the case.” In this case detectives’ main assumption was that the 71-year-old homosexual man (living in an elegant neighborhood of Budapest) had been murdered by another (probably younger and poorer) homosexual. However, all files and the registry itself, along with scores of other official documents, have disappeared and were most likely destroyed by the Communist Party during or shortly after the democratic changes in 1989.

Homosexuality was decriminalized in Hungary in 1961, but until 1978 the age of consent for homosexual sex was 20 as opposed to 14 for heterosexual sex. In 1978 the age of consent was dropped to 18 for same-sex activity under Paragraph 199 of the Penal Code, which imposed a sanction of up to three years in prison for persons found guilty of "unnatural illicit sexual practices" with partners under that age. A further inequality resided in Paragraph 209, which gave police the power to initiate investigations of suspected rape in the case of same-sex acts, whereas investigations of heterosexual acts could only be pursued after the police received a complaint.

In Budapest gay men would continue to meet in the city's hammams (bath houses) and in cruising areas along the Danube. A low-profile gay bar was established in the early 1950s and managed to remain in operation for some twenty years.

Lesbians continued to be less publicly visible than gay men. In 1982 director Károly Makk did bring a lesbian love story to the big screen with Another Way, based on a semi-autobiographical novella Another Love (Törvényen belül) by Erzsébet Galgóczi, who co-wrote the screenplay with Makk. It won the Best Actress Award at the 1982 Cannes Film Festival for Jadwiga Jankowska-Cieślak and was nominated for the Palme d'Or. The film was a notable cult film for lesbian audiences in Cold War Hungary and Poland.

The Homeros Society, Hungary's first gay organization, was established in 1988. Initially a social group, it quickly evolved a political side. Hungarian law required the reporting of positive HIV test results, which discouraged people from being tested. In 1989 the Homeros Society obtained permission to run an anonymous testing clinic in Budapest, on an experimental basis at first.

== Third Hungarian Republic ==
A few years after its foundation the Homeros Society began to produce Mások ("The Others"), an LGBT magazine and established a telephone help-line. The Szivárvány ("Rainbow") Coalition formed in 1994 but not without difficulty. The state refused to grant official registration to the group on two grounds. One was that the full name included the Hungarian word meleg, which had a positive connotation and according to authorities this could "mislead" young people. The other ground was lack of minimum age requirement.

The Háttér Society was established in 1995. One of their first projects was to reach out to LGBT people outside Budapest with another telephone help-line. They also instituted an AIDS prevention project, established an archive, and became the principal organizers of Hungary's annual LGBT pride and film festivals. In May 2000, in conjunction with the Open Society Institute, they opened the Gay Legal Aid Service.

Another group, Habeas Corpus Working Party, was formed in 1996 by a small number of Szivárvány members. In addition to filing petitions with the Constitutional Court, the group sponsors public debates and provides a legal aid service. A specifically lesbian association, Labrisz Lesbian Association, was founded in 1999. It would run a monthly discussion group and work on educational projects. In 2001 several of those groups came together to form Szivárvány Misszió Alapítvány ("Rainbow Mission Foundation"), which now takes charge of organizing the Pride events.

On 17 December 2007, the Parliament adopted a registered partnership bill submitted by the Hungarian Socialist Party–Alliance of Free Democrats Government. The bill was found unconstitutional by the Constitutional Court because it duplicated the institution of marriage for opposite-sex couples. In February 2009, the Parliament approval a modified version of the bill. Since 1 July 2009, same-sex couples can enter into registered partnerships. The law gives the same rights to registered partners as to spouses except for adoption, assisted reproduction or taking a surname.

On 1 January 2012, a new constitution, enacted by the Parliament in 2011, came into effect, restricting marriage to opposite-sex couples and containing no guarantees of protection from discrimination on account of sexual orientation.

In December 2017, a government decree was published, establishing for the first time a legal basis for gender transitions. After 1 January 2018, transgender people living in Hungary were theoretically able to change their legal gender. They required a diagnosis from a medical professional, but did not have to undergo hormone therapy, sterilization or sex reassignment surgery. The Equal Treatment Act specifically included "sexual identity" among the list of protected characteristics.

However, Transvanilla – an organization based in Budapest which campaigns on behalf of transgender rights – reports that the government has refused to honor applications of the legal gender change since 2018. In 2019, a joint case of 23 people was created and submitted to the European Court of Human Rights.

Following the coronavirus lockdown of 2020, Prime Minister Viktor Orbán was enabled to rule by decree following an emergency powers act. On 31 March, the Transgender Day of Visibility, a bill was submitted that redefined the Hungarian term "nem", which may mean either "sex" or "gender", to mean sex at birth, defined as "the biological sex determined by primary sexual characteristics and chromosomes". Parliament voted in favor of the bill on 19 May 2020, making it impossible for individuals to change their legal gender. The vote was 134 yes, 56 no, and 4 abstentions. Dunja Mijatović, commissioner for human rights in the Council of Europe, stated it "contravenes human rights standards and the case law of the European Court of Human Rights". President János Áder signed the bill into law on 28 May 2020.

In November 2020, the Fidesz government proposed a Constitutional amendment which would ban adoption by same-sex couples. Language in the amendment would ensure "education in accordance with the values based on Hungary's constitutional identity and Christian culture". The same amendment would also severely restrict the ability of single-parent families to adopt. On 16 December 2020 the amendment was passed by the National Assembly with 123 ayes, 45 nays and five abstentions.

In January 2021 the government ordered that a book published by the Labrisz Lesbian Association carries warnings saying it "[contains] behaviour inconsistent with traditional gender roles". According to a government spokesperson, "the book is sold as a fairytale... but it hides the fact that it depicts behaviour inconsistent with traditional gender roles." In response, the association announced that they would be filing suit.

== See also ==
- Hungarian anti-LGBTQ law
- Hungarian Pride ban
- LGBTQ rights in Hungary
- Pink Picnic
- The Fall of Communism as Seen in Gay Pornography
