= Dodo Karsay =

Hungarian human rights activist

Karsay in 2011

Dodo Karsay (born 25 April 1985) is a Hungarian human rights activist, researcher, and consultant with a focus on the experiences and rights of historically marginalised groups, particularly LGBTQI people, asylum seekers, and persons with disabilities.

They are best known in Hungary as the singer of the viral protest song "Nem tetszik a rendszer!" ("I Don't Like the System!"), performed at the "Milla" rally in 2011.

== Activism and career ==
Karsay graduated from Eötvös Loránd University (ELTE) in Sociology and English, and from Central European University in Human Rights. They also studied at the Afro-American Studies Department of the University of California, Los Angeles.

They served as the spokesperson of Budapest Pride and as a board member of the Hungarian LGBT Alliance. They previously worked with Amnesty International and the Menedék Migrant Aid Association.

They served as Research and Information Officer at ARC International, an LGBT rights organisation that works closely with the United Nations. In this role they co-authored the joint report Sexual Orientation, Gender Identity and Expression, and Sex Characteristics at the Universal Periodic Review alongside ILGA and the IBAHRI, presented at a UN side event in Geneva in January 2017.

Karsay has also worked as a trans asylum expert with TGEU (Transgender Europe), co-promoting resources for LGBTI asylum seekers across Europe.

They currently live in Stockholm, Sweden, where they continue their work as a queer-feminist activist and human rights consultant.

== Media coverage ==
Karsay's involvement in the 2011 protests attracted immediate coverage from major Hungarian media. HVG, one of Hungary's leading news magazines, profiled their role in the Milla movement and described the song as capturing the spirit of the demonstrations. They were interviewed by Magyar Narancs, one of Hungary's leading political weeklies, in the days following the protest, explaining their motivation for writing the song. In 2013, the American public radio programme The World (produced by PRX and WGBH) featured Karsay in a report on the soundtrack of Hungary's protest movement, making them one of the few figures from the 2011 demonstrations to receive coverage in international English-language media. In 2016, 168 Óra revisited their trajectory in a feature on former anti-government activists, reporting that they had moved abroad and continued human rights work.

== Nem tetszik a rendszer ==
In October 2011, Karsay performed the protest song "Nem tetszik a rendszer! (I Don't Like the System!)" at the mass One Million for the Freedom of the Press in Hungary (Milla) demonstration on Szabad Sajtó Street in Budapest, which drew an estimated 100,000 people. The song, co-written with Norbert Pálfi, Zsolt Máthé, and Tamás Jónás, became a viral hit on YouTube and a symbol of the Hungarian pro-democracy protest movement.

== See also ==
- Hungarian LGBT Alliance
- Budapest Pride
