= Háttér Archive =

LGBTQI archive and library in Hungary

- Háttér Archívum
- Founder: Sándor Nagy
- Founded at: Budapest
- Type: library, archive
- Location: Budapest
- Official language: Hungarian
- Leader: Sándor Nagy
- Website: http://en.hatter.hu/what-we-do/archive-and-library

Háttér Archive is the oldest and largest LGBT+ archive and library in Hungary. It is a unique LGBT+ collection in Eastern Europe. It is an integral part of Háttér Society, located on the premises of the association. Háttér Archive was founded by Sándor Nagy, who - together with his colleagues - collects gay, lesbian, bisexual, transgender etc. materials since the founding of Háttér Society in 1995 - with a special attention to LGBT+ history.

== Collections ==
=== Books and periodicals ===
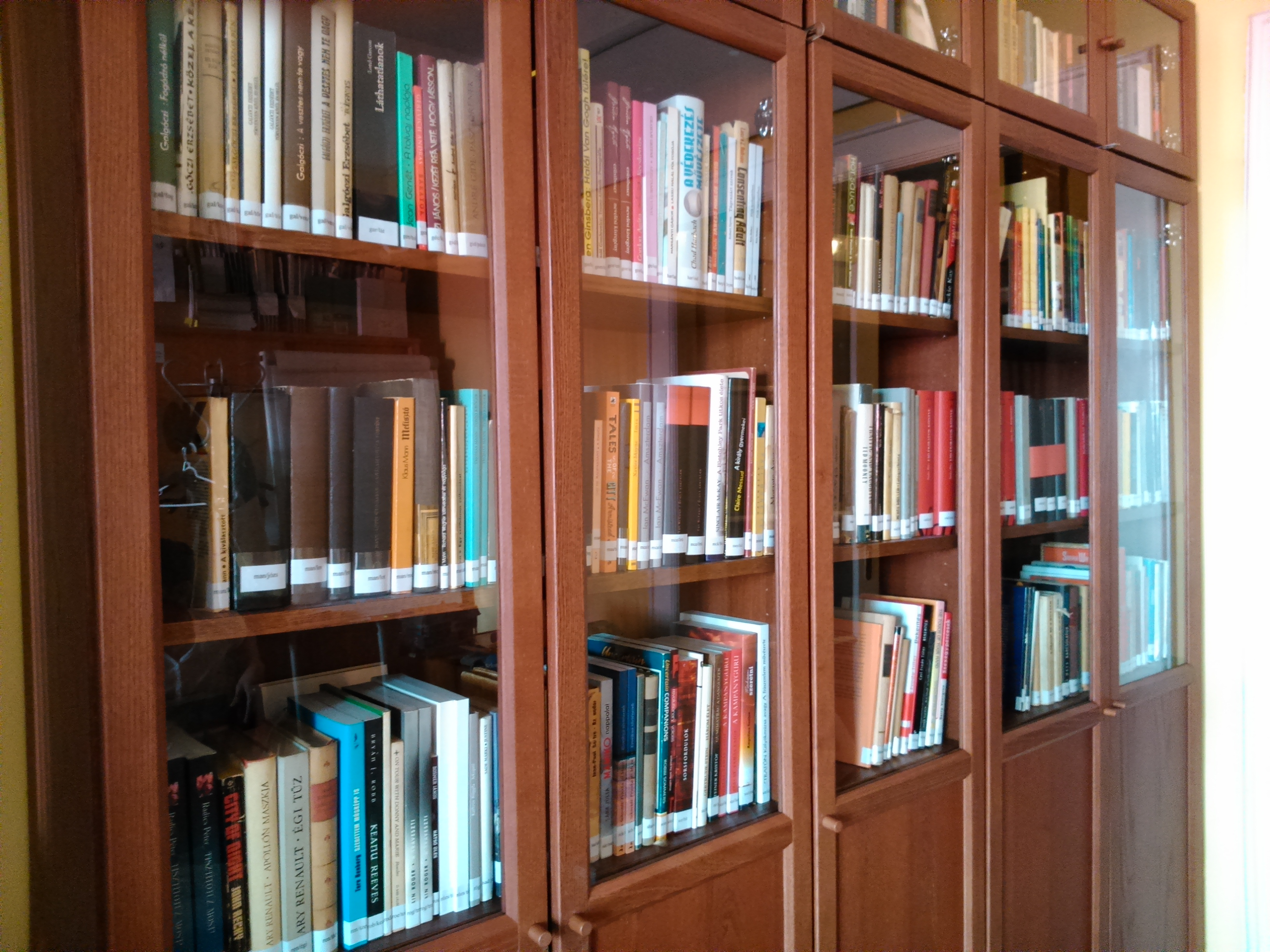

Háttér Archive currently holds about 1500 volumes of books including fiction and non-fiction about various aspects of LGBT+ lifestyle, LGBT+ history, etc. It also hold more than 300 issues of scientific or cultural periodicals covering various LGBT+ topics. The majority of the materials are in Hungarian, but some are also available in English, German, French and other languages. Most of the books were acquired via donations from private individuals or publishers. The Archive also collects press clippings from various newspapers and magazines covering LGBT+ themes (political movements, legal issues, lifestyles, HIV/AIDS-prevention, cultural events etc.). The collection covers the past 25 years of Hungarian LGBT+ history, and is thus a unique and valuable source of information.

The archive holds a full collection of Hungarian LGBT+ periodicals including Mások, Labrisz magazin, Na végre!, Company, and Humen; as well as a selection of foreign magazines, most notably the famous American LGBT+ periodical: The ONE.

=== Audiovisual materials ===
The audio-visual collection holds more than 1000 documentary, feature and short films on VHS, DVD or other electronic form that have been screened at LGBT+ film festivals Hungary or in cinemas, or broadcast on television or available on internet.

=== Photo collection ===
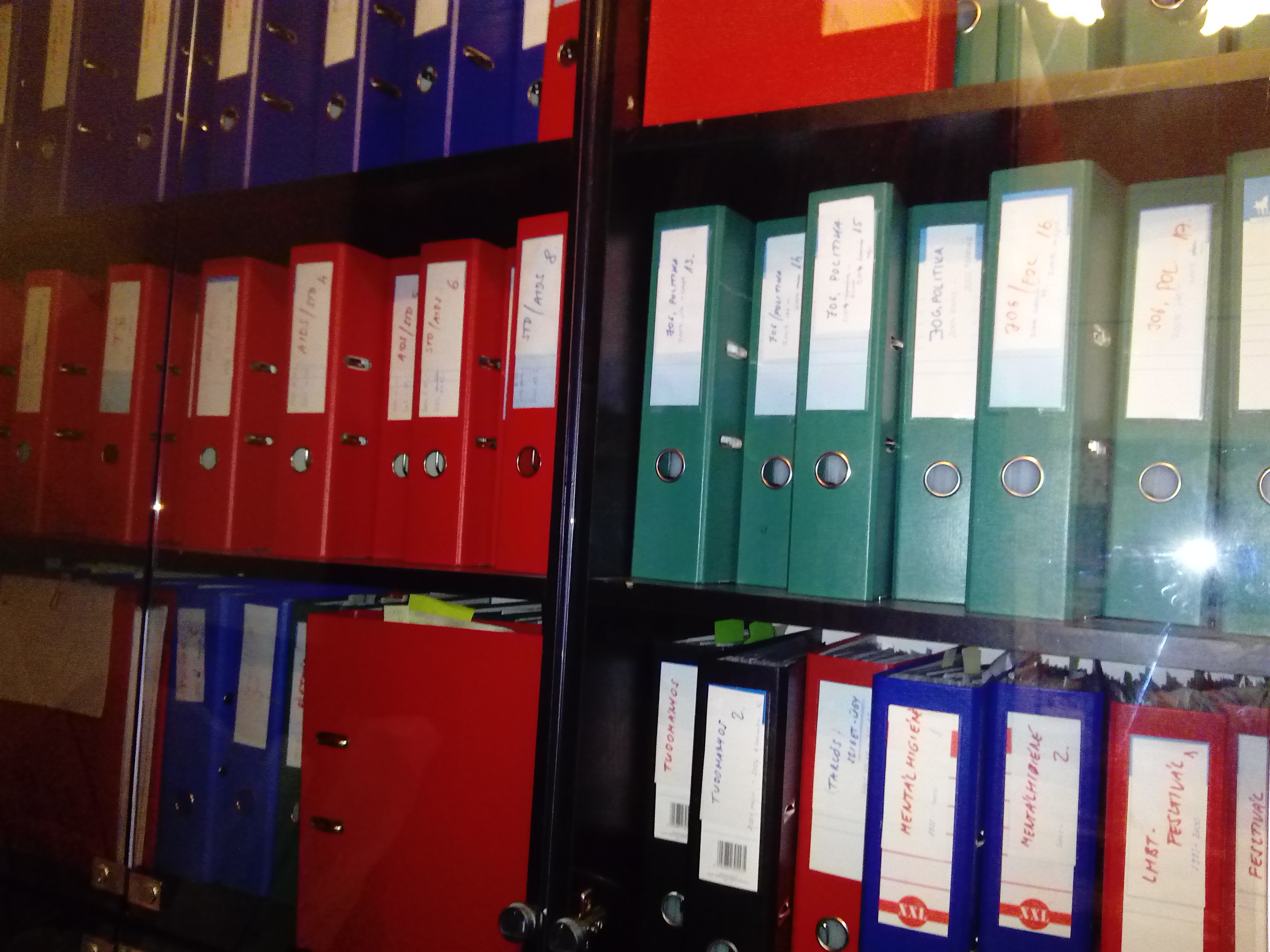
The press collection

The archive collects photographs about various LGBT+ events, LGBT+ people and other LGBT+ themes in print and in electronic formats.

=== Archival materials ===
The archival materials consist of documents of LGBT+ festivals, LGBT+ organization in Hungary, and leaflets, posters and other small prints (flyers, brochures etc.).

=== Textiles, objects ===
The collection includes textiles (T-shirts, bags, flags, molinos etc.), billboards, banners, gifts, souvenirs, badges etc. also.

== Electronic database and catalogue ==
The electronic database and catalogue system of the Háttér Archive will be published on the webpage of Háttér Society soon. The database system contains LGBT+ themed literary works, films, newspaper articles available in Hungary. This catalogue will be extended with audio-visual materials as well as leaflets, posters, and other archival materials which are collected by the Archive.

== Clients ==
The archive can assist mostly to students in higher education to prepare their papers, theses and doctoral dissertations; researchers by providing access to hard-to-reach scientific materials to be used in various research projects (e.g. surveys among transgender people, young gay men, policemen, health workers etc.); journalists to show a more accurate and diverse picture of the LGBT+ community.

== Networkings ==
Háttér Archive have collaborated with IHLIA-Homodok by sending materials (books, brochures, flyers etc.) for centralized archiving. The Archive is working together with ONE National Gay & Lesbian Archives as well. Members of the Archive took part in recent LGBT ALMS Conferences (Amsterdam, 2012; London, 2016) and in other projects (e.g. OpenUp project). The Archive also has professional ties with the Metropolitan Ervin Szabó Library of Budapest.

== Other activities ==
Háttér Archive also takes an active part in organizing the LGBT History Month in Hungary (with the other main organizer Labrisz Lesbian Association) every February by organizing workshops, lectures and other cultural events.

In 2021, Háttér Archive co-organised an offline and online exhibition with Blinken Open Society Archives entitled Records Uncovered. The exhibition focuses on the gay and lesbian movements in Central and Southeastern Europe between the mid 1940s and the early 1990s.
