= Fortepan =

Community photo archive based in Budapest, Hungary

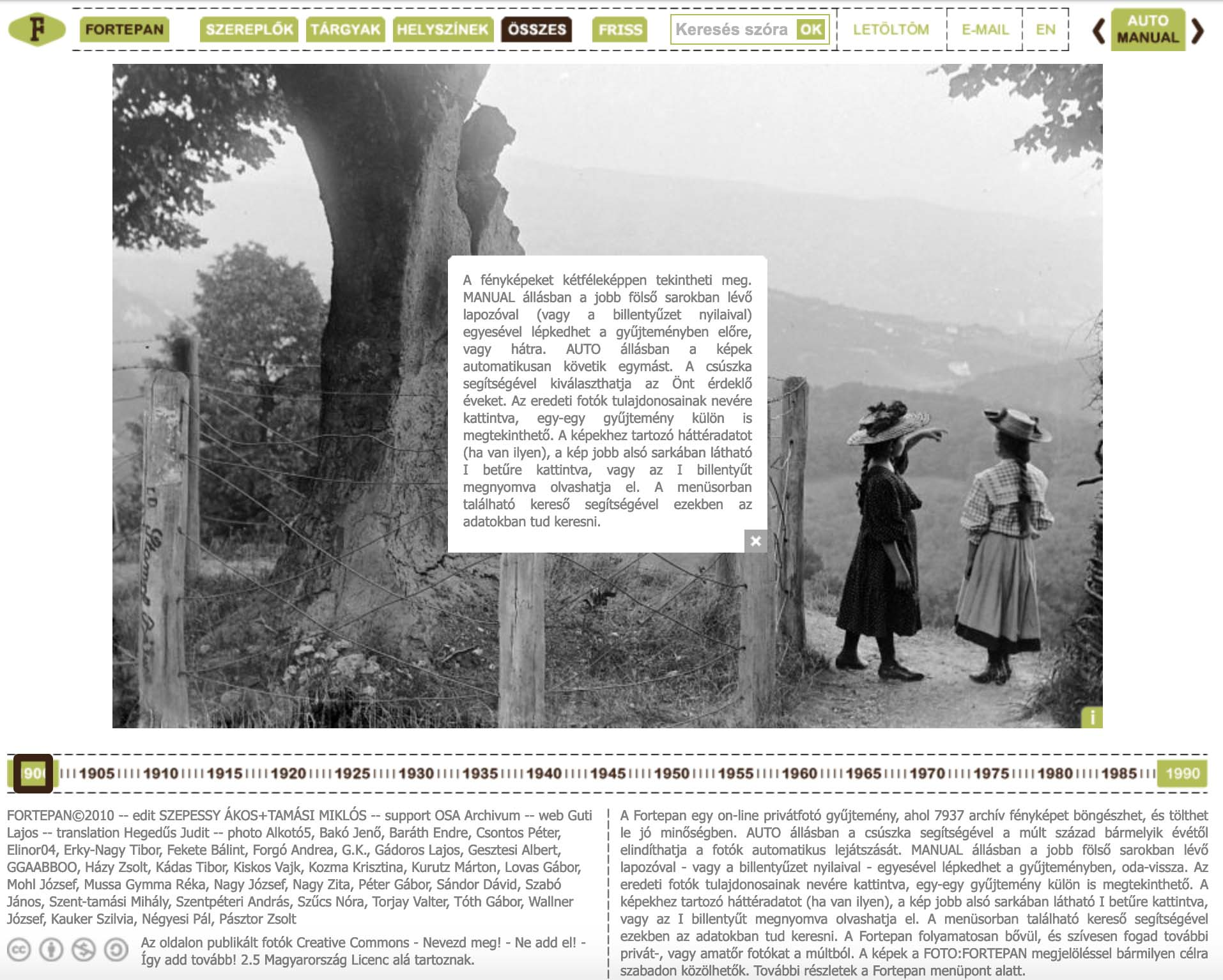
- Interactive map of Fortepan
- 47.50691671280112°N 19.034465244177834°E
- Location: Mária tér 4., Budapest, Hungary
- Type: Photo
- Established: 2010
- Website: https://fortepan.hu/

Fortepan is a community photo archive based in Budapest, Hungary, established in 2010. Today the archive contains more than 200,000 digitized high-resolution archival photos that capture everyday twentieth-century life in Hungary. Fortepan photos are organized along an interactive timeline and are publicly available for anyone to search, tag, download, and use.

== History ==
=== Founding ===
Fortepan was created in 2010 by Miklós Tamási and Ákos Szepessy, who met while attending the Kaffka Margit High School in the late 1980s. Sharing an interest in old photographs, they started to collect discarded prints and especially negatives from family collections, which they found at flea markets, in the streets of Budapest during "lomtalanítás" (Budapest's annual bulk waste collection service, organized on a district-by-district basis), and estate sales. Tamási and Szepessy stored their found photos, mostly negatives, in paper bags, and forgot about them until the 2000s, when they concluded these images might be worth sharing. Their first thought was to create a book project. Then they decided to scan the photos and upload the digital files to an image-hosting site. Tamási began scanning in 2009. After scanning approximately 10,000 photos, he selected 5,000 to upload to a new website they called "Fortepan." Fortepan was a global brand of negative film produced in Hungary at the Forte factory in Vác from 1947 to 2001.

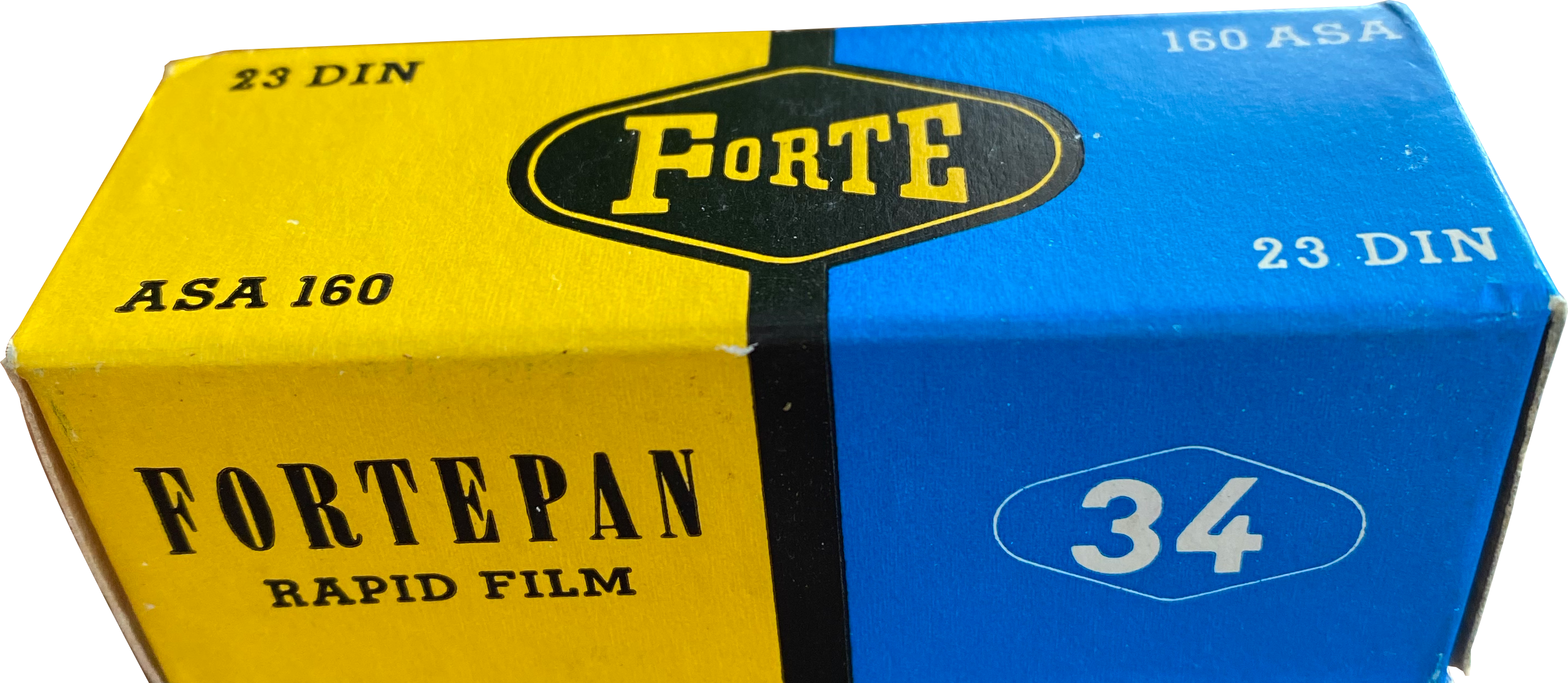
Fortepan film, developed by the Forte company in Vác, Hungary

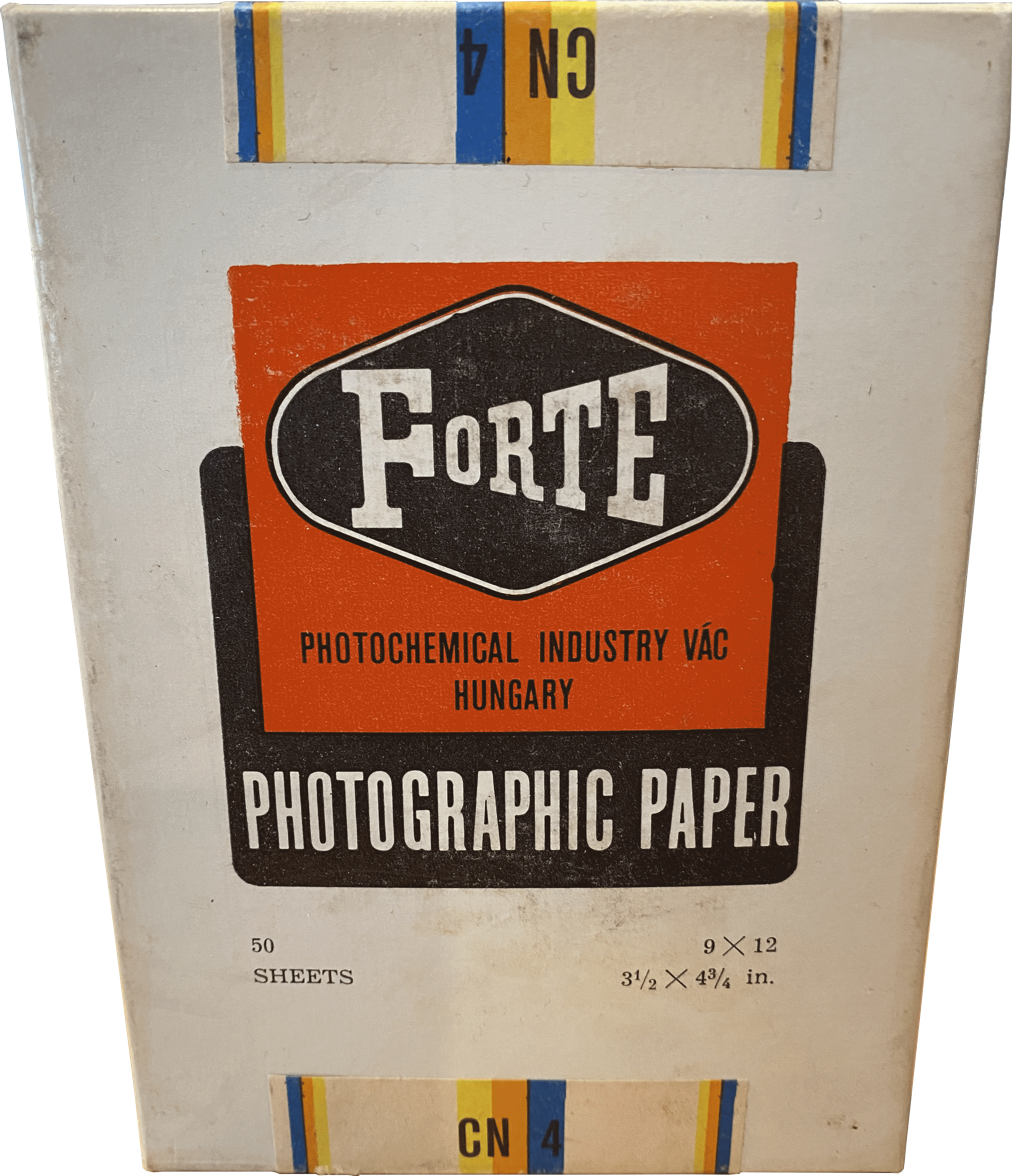
Forte also manufactured photographic development paper.

The Forte factory originated as a Kodak photochemical plant, built in 1922, which was sold to a Hungarian bank in 1947, renamed "Forte," and nationalized in 1948. Fortepan film was a popular film brand, used extensively by amateur photographers. Before Fortepan's launch, initial funding for Fortepan's development was facilitated by the Kortörténeti Foundation in Budapest.

=== Early Fortepan ===
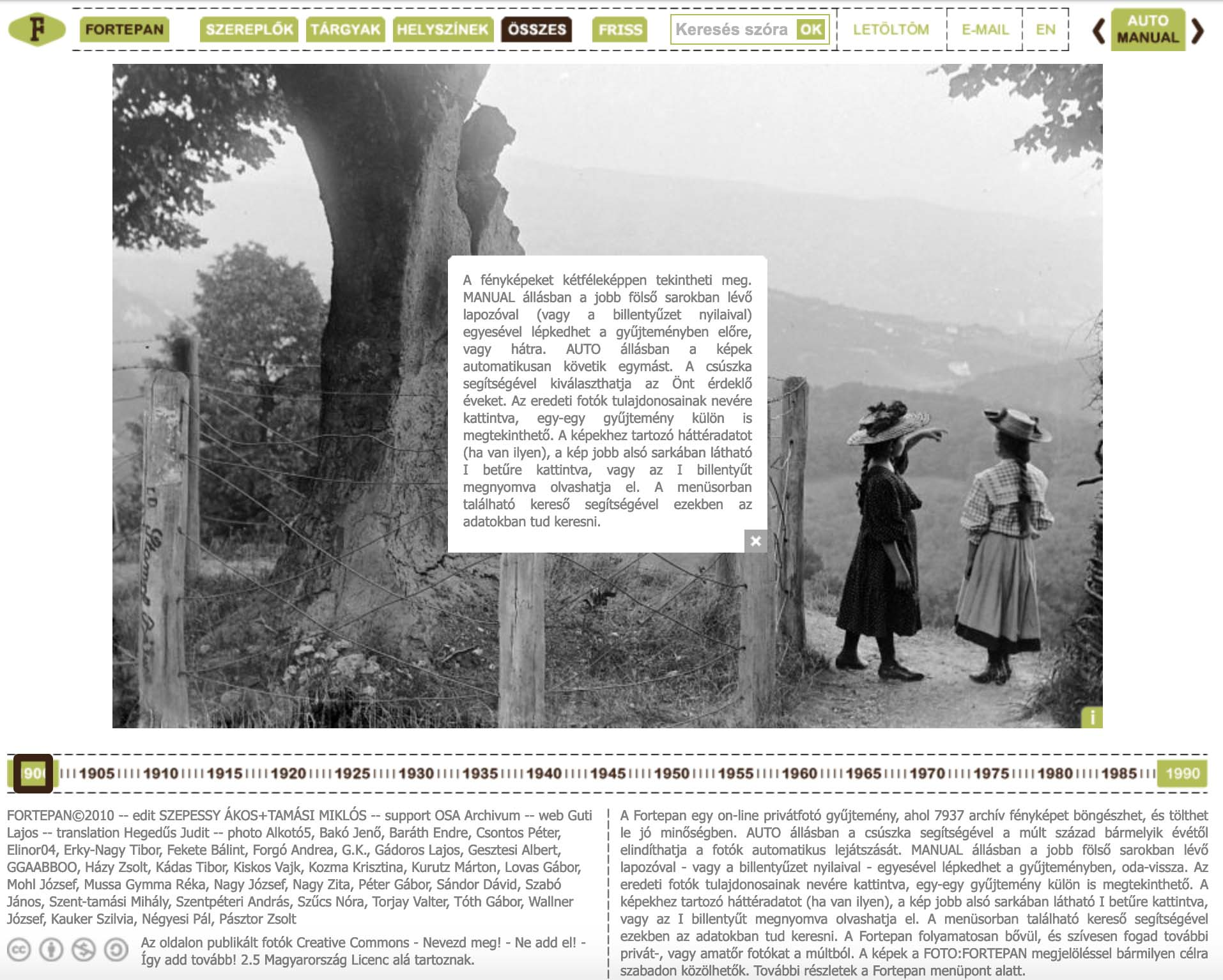
Fortepan archive, March 4, 2011, soon after its launch in 2010.

The new public archive was launched on August 20, 2010, featuring full-size photos organized chronologically along a timeline and controlled by a slider. The chronological approach immediately contextualized the photos in history, telling a visual story of Hungary through the photos of multiple family collections. As Miklós Tamási noted in a 2021 interview with investor György Simó, "Something was needed to link the photos together and there is no better tool than time." Tamási also determined to end the timeline at the year 1990, not because this marked a period in Hungarian history when Hungary was transitioning from communism to democracy, but because Tamási was convinced photos after 1990, firmly in the digital photography era, were less interesting.

Fortepan's founders hoped to encourage public interaction and use of the photos, so they added crowdsourced tagging capabilities, a search function to search the tags, and they licensed all photos to the Creative Commons, first using an Attribution-Noncommercial-ShareAlike (CC-BY-SA-NC) license and then settling on an Attribution-ShareAlike 3.0 (CC-BY-SA) license. The CC license allows anyone to use a Fortepan photo, even for commercial purposes, as long as they attribute the donor and the archive.

Ákos Szepessy left the project early on to pursue other interests and Tamási became the sole visionary behind the Fortepan archive. The photo project complimented Tamási's day job as Program Director for the Blinken Open Society Archives (OSA), a division of Central European University, which involved curating exhibitions. With OSA's support, Tamási managed new volunteers from his OSA office; more people scanned photos and volunteers maintained Facebook and Instagram accounts and edited incoming tags. One volunteer also initiated a public forum through which to discuss and "codebreak"– identify locations, dates, events and people – select photos. Soon, Summa Artium Director András Török came on to perform accounting and other administrative tasks, and became the face of Fortepan: whenever there was a live event, Török promoted the archival platform.

=== Fortepan, 2014 – Today ===
Fortepan began an important partnership with Hungary's most prominent online news and arts portal, Index.hu, which began publishing weekly photo spreads in October, 2014. Fortepan rapidly gained recognition from a wide Hungarian public that was unexpectedly enthusiastic about the public photo project. The archive expanded to approximately 50,000 photos by its fifth year. In 2016, Fortepan developed a partnership with the Budapest City Archives, the first Hungarian institution to turn over a portion of their collection to Fortepan. This donated collection depicted post-1956 crime scene investigations from the Budapest Police Headquarters. Other cultural institutions also began to use Fortepan as a way to introduce the public to their holdings.

In 2018, Tamási began collaborations with photo editor and curator István Virágvölgyi of the Robert Capa Center in Budapest towards an invited museum exhibition at the Hungarian National Gallery (Magyar Nemzeti Galéria), the first time the Fortepan archive had such a high-profile public platform. Tamási, Virágvölgyi, and assistant Mária Madár selected 200 photographs for display. The exhibition launched in April 2019 with record-breaking attendance, to the point that the Gallery scheduled a 6-week extension past its initial four-month run. The exhibition celebrated 110,000 photos uploaded to Fortepan.

The first permanent non-digital exhibition of Fortepan, KultúrFényPont, can be seen at Fény utca market near the Mammut Mall in District II. The free-to-visit display changes periodically, to showcase Fortepan's diverse collection. The archive is rapidly expanding with significant donations of photographic collections. Professional photographers, like Sándor Kereki, have started to publish and preserve their bodies of work on Fortepan. In 2022, the Budapest Office of Public Construction, FŐMTERV, donated 3,000 photos beginning in 1950s that depict Budapest's postwar construction and development.

In May 2023, the database contained approximately 180,000 photographs.

== Function and description ==
Fortepan can be considered innovative, perhaps even disruptive, to archiving practices on a number levels. First is its chronological organization strategy. Most of the photos are connected to a singular place, Hungary, and depict everyday Hungarian life. As a digital-only archive, Fortepan's founders rejected traditional archiving methods used at museums, libraries, and state archives, which display digital photos online to directly correspond to the physical originals stored in the back room. Traditional archives that have digitized some of their collections and moved them online often continue to organize digital objects within an individual collection and upload images, such as photos, with attention to the collection's historical order and provenance. Since Fortepan founder Miklós Tamási was more concerned with user experience and public exploration, he felt that time and place was the best way to introduce users to the photos in the archive. As a result, a Fortepan user enters the archive at a point in time, for example, the 1930s, and sees images from multiple collections that share the same date. The result is an unfolding of visual collective memory from the 20th century, and a new way to experience digital photo archives.

Fortepan is also curated, with subjective curation choices connected to one individual, Miklós Tamási. During the curation process, Tamási chooses the images that he deems significant enough to be preserved, and typically uploads only about 30 percent of all images scanned. Curation and the omission of redundant content allows for a more engaging, satisfying browsing experience. The selected images often include details of public life, such as clothing, streetscapes, house and building interiors, technical equipment, motorized vehicles, fairs and festivals, holiday traditions, emotional moments in Hungarians' lives, or photos that are artistically beautiful. Tamási tends to reject photos that document violence or aggression between people, or difficult subjects like suicides. However, when a state system or a repressive organization is the aggressor (such as a state official, soldier, or policeman), then he tends to include the photo. In contrast, traditional archiving practices are more inclined towards preservation, so selection methods are more bureaucratic. Fortepan returns all scanned items to the donating family or institution, along with the entire body of digital scans, regardless of whether they are uploaded to the Fortepan archive. Tamási annually turns over unclaimed photographic prints and negatives to the Budapest City Archives; some photograph originals are also placed within the Ervin Szabó Metropolitan Library's Budapest Collection, or the Hungarian National Museum.

In turning over the metadata to volunteers, Fortepan again challenged traditional archiving practices. Anyone who creates an account can participate in image tagging (a small team of Fortepan editors approve each tag). Each image tag increases the searchability of the archive, and tags appear in both Hungarian and English. Furthermore, the Fortepan Forum invites the public to engage with the archive by adding information to help understand the backstory or content of a photograph.

=== Expansions of the Fortepan Model ===
Fortepan Iowa is the first sister site of Fortepan.hu, developed at the University of Northern Iowa and launched in 2015. In 2019 another sister site, Azopan launched which collects Romanian photos.

== Projects ==
The Fortepan Hungary team has spearheaded and facilitated many projects based on Fortepan photos that promote public engagement with the photographic record.

ForteGo is a free smartphone app that allows users to access archival Fortepan photos and, through geolocation, direct a user to that photo's location, matching the historical photo to the present day. Users are directed to re-take a photo from the same place and direction to create a then-and-now photo pair to save and share with others. Approximately 2000 photos of downtown Budapest are accessible in ForteGo.

ForteBolt is a shop that makes books based on Fortepan photographs available for purchase ("bolt" means shop in Hungarian). Titles in the series include Elfelejtett Budapest / Forgotten Budapest, A Pesti Nő / Women of Budapest, Kérek Egy Feketét / Coffee Please, Tekerj! / Ride On!, Hirdesse büszkén / Advertise Proudly, and Jön A Gőzös / Here Comes the Train.

Heti Fortepan (Weekly Fortepan) is a weekly blog launched developed in 2020 by Virágvölgyi through a formal partnership between Fortepan and the Robert Capa Center to share more stories behind select Fortepan photos. Fortepan launched a bi-monthly English version of the blog in 2021.

== Outside Projects ==
Several independent creators have developed projects based on Fortepan content.

- Fortepan Masters is a book project curated by Hungarian photographer Szabolcs Barakonyi, designed by Zalán Péter Salát, and published in 2021. The 690-page book contains 330 Fortepan photos as well as a lengthy interview with Miklós Tamási.
- Fortepan: versek is a book of poems written by poet and author Zsuzsa Rakovszky that was inspired by Fortepan photos.
- Proud & Torn: A Visual Memoir of Hungarian History by Bettina Fabos is an interactive graphic novel about Hungarian history, which is largely based on Fortepan photos.
