= Blinken Open Society Archives =

Archival repository and laboratory

Coordinates: 47.5025°N 19.0534°E

Blinken OSA Archivum
- Location: Central European University, Budapest, Budapest, Hungary
- Established: 1995

Other information
- Website: archivum.org

The Blinken OSA Archivum (abbreviated as the Archivum) is a dynamic archival institution that aims to explore new ways of assessing, contextualizing, presenting, and making use of archival documents both in a professional and a consciously activist way. It was founded by George Soros in 1995, and opened in 1996 as a department of the Central European University. Originally called simply Open Society Archives (OSA), in 2015 it was renamed Vera and Donald Blinken Open Society Archives after receiving a major donation from the couple. The Archivum changed its name once again in 2024, and assume the current one, together with a new look and new websites.

Its archival holdings relate to post-war European history, the Cold War, the history of the former Eastern Bloc, samizdat, the history of propaganda, human rights, and war crimes. The Archivum is also the archive of the global activities of the Open Society Foundations.

The Archivum also functions as a teaching and research department of the Central European University and offers MA and PhD courses on the theories and methods of archives, evidence, human rights, documentary cinema, twentieth century history, and the politics of the Cold War.

The institution is located in central Budapest, in the Goldberger House, which was originally built in 1911 as a textile warehouse, and later functioned in the 1980s as the "dollar shop" in Budapest, where goods could only be purchased with hard currency.

The building now also incorporates a gallery space, the Galeria Centralis, which hosts the Archivum's public programs, exhibitions and conferences.

== Holdings ==
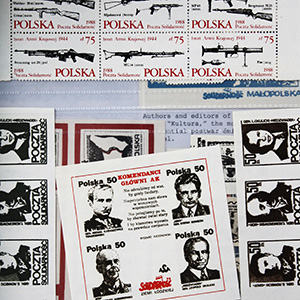
Stamps produced by the Polish underground in the early 1980s, held at OSA Archivum Budapest

The archive curates, preserves and makes accessible multilingual collections in over 40 languages spanning the period from World War II until the present, with a global geographical coverage but special focus on East-Central Europe and the former Soviet Union.

The Archivum’s acquisition policy aims to collect and preserve the documentary heritage of civil society, human rights movements, transnational and intra-governmental organizations, social and protest movements, and the personal papers of known oppositional figures and social activists. From its inception, the Archivum has assisted in rescuing endangered collections, and plays a bridging role in making scattered documentary legacies of communities and supranational organizations researchable. By introducing open access principles in the region since 2002, the Archivum continues to support and initiate projects about freedom of information, freedom of speech, access to information and open standards.

=== Cold War ===
The original core of the Archivum's holdings is the former archives of the Radio Free Europe/Radio Liberty Research Institute, previously based in Munich and New York. These include RFE internal research publications produced to support the national broadcasting desks, transcripts of central broadcasts from RFE/RL’s target countries, anonymized interviews with eastern European émigrés and travellers, almost all daily papers and magazines published in or about Eastern Europe between 1951 and 1993, records and transcripts of Eastern European radio and television programs and other supporting materials used for daily broadcasts. The successor to the RFE/RL Research Institute, the Open Media Research Institute, also donated its collections, thus the Archivum preserves one of the largest mass media operations of the twentieth century from 1951 till 1997.

Other Cold War holdings include special collections on the 1956 Hungarian Revolution, 1956 Refugees, documents and sound-recordings on the activities of the UN Special Committee on the Problem of Hungary, intelligence material gathered by former State Security agencies of the Eastern Bloc, paranoia, and Eastern European samizdat publications including underground materials from Hungary, Czechoslovakia and Poland.

The Archivum acquires materials from international organizations such as Foundation for the Support of European Intellectuals, which provided grants to build intellectual networks during the Cold War.

The Archivum holds the personal papers of a number of prominent former opposition or exile figures, including General Béla Király, Gábor Demszky, György Krassó, János Kis, László Rajk, and Iván Pető, and the personal papers of international experts such as Alfréd Reisch and David S. Rohde.

In 2012, the Archivum acquired the materials of the Hungarian Institute for Public Opinion Research, the only public opinion research institute to operate in a Soviet bloc country.

The Archivum's holdings include extensive collections of textual documents, documentaries and moving images of the transition after the fall of the Soviet regimes in Eastern Europe, and of the afterlife of Communism. These include collections of home movies, home movies on Srebrenica, and video recordings of alternative culture in Hungary in the early 1990s.

=== Human rights ===
The archival holdings relate to human rights in general, and grave violations of human rights in particular, and include the archives of the London-based periodical Index on Censorship, the International Human Rights Law Institute Relating to the Conflict in the Former Yugoslavia, the International Helsinki Federation for Human Rights, and the Office of the High Representative, the body that oversaw the implementation of the 1995 Dayton Agreement in Bosnia and Herzegovina. The Archivum also holds documentaries, amateur videos and propaganda films, comprising several thousands of hours, compiled by the International Monitor Institute to document human rights violations and genocide, and video recordings produced by the New York-based human rights group WITNESS.

=== Open Society Foundations ===
The Archivum acts as the official archive of the Central European University and Open Society Foundations (OSF) organizations, among them the Open Society Institute Budapest, International Science Foundation, Cultural Initiative Russia, Forced Migration Project, Soros Foundation Hungary, and West Balkan Open Society Foundations. Other OSF-related activities include the maintenance of the global digital repository of the network, and offering consultancy services on recordkeeping, data curation and digital preservation to all OSF entities and projects.

=== Digital holdings and curated collections ===
The digital repository contains, among other collections, over 117,200 items on former Eastern Bloc history from 1951 to 1994, including RFE/RL collections recently placed online as part of Europeana's Heritage of People's Europe project, funded by the European Union.

The archive offers digital collections curated and supplemented by the Archivum's staff. Among these is the virtual exhibition 1989: Lesz-e? ("Will There be a 1989?"). This exhibition contains almost 10.000 items (photos, videos, textual pages, audio materials) made by or connected to the year 1989, and Hungarian regime change.

=== Access ===
The Archivum promotes an open access policy and does not limit access to its collections on the basis of citizenship and profession. Its reading room, both the online and the physical, is open to all visitors. The Archivum strongly supports the use of materials through digital reproduction and offers a digitization on demand service.

=== Library ===
The Archivum’s non-circulating Library holds books and periodicals in over 40 languages covering the period 1950 to the present, which relate to its archival holdings. The Library consists mainly of the library collection of the Radio Free Europe/Radio Liberty, the Open Media Research Institute, and donations from individual and institutional partners. It includes publications from and about Central and Eastern Europe and the former Soviet Union, as well as books and journals from Western countries about the history, culture, and politics of the region. The Library also contains around 40,000 newspapers and journals on microfilm and microfiche.

The Special Library collections include the London-based Wiener Library's Testaments to the Holocaust collections on the history of Nazism and the European Jews, the Prague Spring 1968 collection, Polish Independent Publications, US Government documents on the Soviet Union and Eastern Europe, and Radio Free Europe/Radio Liberty Publications.

== Galeria Centralis ==
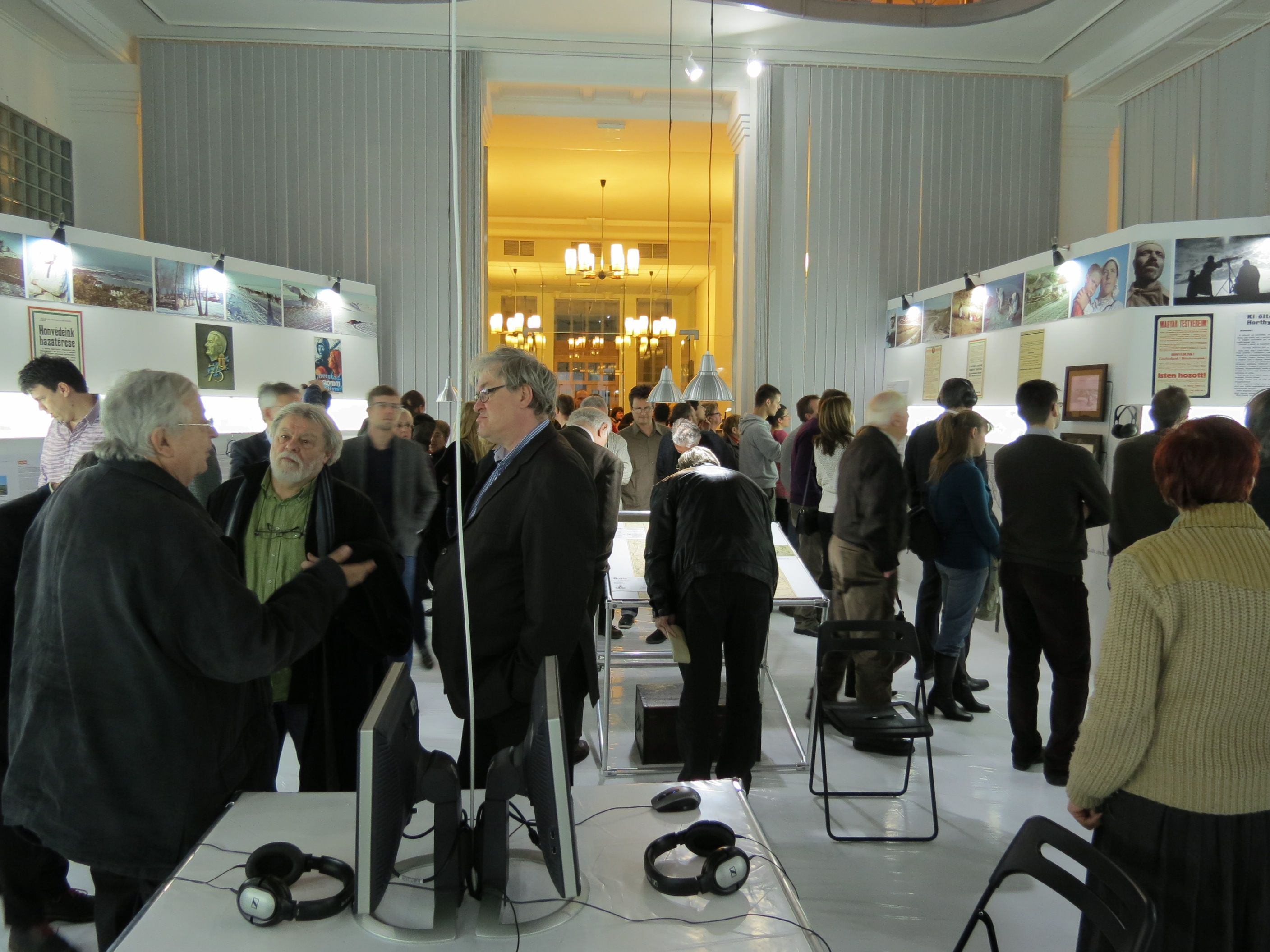
Don exhibition opening at Galeria Centralis

Galeria Centralis is an exhibition and screening hall that hosts The Archivum’s exhibitions, conferences and public events. The space is used as a platform for turning the archive inside out, bringing archival materials to the public’s attention, and by contextualizing the available historical evidence, initiating public debates on questions of social and historical importance.

Notable recent events include The Trial, a historical reconstruction commemorating the 50th anniversary of the secret trial and execution of Imre Nagy and co-defendants in 1958, for which the Archivum publicly broadcast tape recordings of the 52-hour-long trial in real time.

Exhibitions include an exhibition on the sixtieth anniversary of the disappearance of the Swedish diplomat Raoul Wallenberg, which included a reconstruction of Wallenberg's office in the Swedish Embassy in Second Life, a public reconstruction based on forensic and exhumatation data gathered in the course of researching the Bosnian Serb Army's 1995 Srebrenica massacre of over 8,000 Muslim men and boys, an exhibition exploring the contemporary reception on the sixtieth anniversary of the restoration of Northern Transylvania to Hungary under the Second Vienna Award, and an exhibition marking the seventieth anniversary of the Hungarian Second Army's defeat by the Soviets at the River Don.

In 2021, the Archivum co-organised an online exhibition with Háttér Archive entitled Records Uncovered. The exhibition focuses on the gay and lesbian movements in Central and Southeastern Europe between the mid-1940s and the early 1990s.

== Projects and public engagement ==
The Archivum initiated the annual Verzió International Human Rights Documentary Film Festival, and has a rapidly growing global collection of human rights documentary films. The Archivum is also the initiator of the annual celebration of 100-year-old buildings in the Hungarian capital, Budapest 100, the amateur photo archive Fortepan, and a co-initiator of the Diafilm virtual filmstrip museum.

In 2014, the main public program was the Yellow-Star Houses project, focusing on the remaining 1,600 former yellow-star houses in Budapest which, from June 21, 1944 until the establishment of the ghetto in November 1944, were designated compulsory residences for Jews, and marked with a yellow-star. Using traditional archival research and contemporary mapping and crowd-sourcing technologies, the project marked the 70th anniversary of the Holocaust in Hungary, and aimed to involve the contemporary residents of the city in exploring this lesser-known chapter of Budapest's history.

The Archivum is one of the initiators of the Budapest Open Access Initiative, one of the original signatories of the Open Document Format Alliance, and the founder of the Parallel Archive, a digital humanities tool where researchers are encouraged to digitize, tag, comment, and make publicly available the documents they find in the Archivum's holdings. In 2010, the Archivum ‘leaked’ thousands of previously classified documents from its holdings relating to the Cold War conflict on the Parallel Archive.

The Archivum also participates in the Voices of the 20th Century Archive and Research Group, led by the Institute of Sociology of the Hungarian Academy of Sciences, and in cooperation with the National Audiovisual Archive of Hungary. The project analyzes how different types of interview material can be enhanced through digital technologies and re-used for further research.

Together with the International Visegrad Fund, the Archivum also awards a number of research scholarships every year.

== Prizes ==
In 2010, the Archivum was awarded the Joseph Pulitzer Memorial Prize in the History of the Press category.

== See also ==
- CEU Press
- List of archives in Hungary
