= Three Border Mountain =

Mountain in Budapest, Hungary

Coordinates: 47.5553°N 18.9991°E

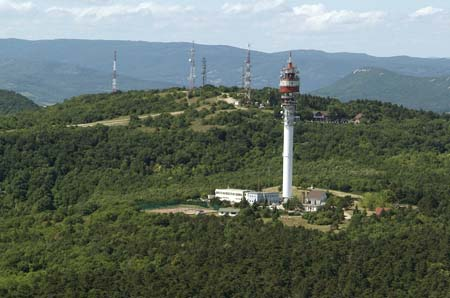
Aerial photography

Three Border Mountain (Hungarian: Hármashatár-hegy, German: Drei·hotter·berg) is the name of a mountain in the city of Budapest, Hungary. Its name comes from the fact that the borders of three cities (Buda, Óbuda, Pesthidegkút) met at this point in the 19th century. Today, these cities have merged into Budapest, but the mountain's name has remained unchanged. The border between the 2nd district and 3rd district still bisects the mountain.

== Background ==
The mountain is part of the Buda Hills (Budai Hegyek). The mountain is located on the Buda side, at 495 metres (1,624 ft) above sea level. The mountain is a popular place for hiking, biking and paragliding. In the winter it is also a place for sled riding. There are several trails in the area, but the only one that reaches the top is the blue trail, also known as the Country Blue Trail (Az Országos Kéktúra). At the summit there are television and radio towers, as well as a restaurant.

It is often windy at the peak, due to the lack of trees. Snow may linger up to two weeks after the snow in the city has melted. On average, the temperature is a couple of degrees Celsius less than on the Pest side.

The non-public Hármashatárhegy Airport (ICAO code: LHHH) has a single 1000 x 100 m runway and serves the Budapest-Hármashatárhegy region.
