= Company (LGBT magazine) =

Hungarian LGBT magazine

Company is a monthly magazine for the Hungarian LGBT community, freely available in gay venues of Budapest. It provides news, reports, reviews and advertisements. It has been published since December 2009, replacing Na végre!. It is published in A5 size, on 30–60 pages.

== See also ==
- Mások
- Na végre!
