= Na végre! =

Na végre! (Hungarian pronunciation: [ˈnɒ ˈveːɡrɛ], "About time!" or "At last!"; ISSN 1787-4556 for the print version and ISSN 1787-9507 for the online version) was a free monthly booklet for LGBT people in Budapest with news, reports, reviews and advertisements (its articles made up 60% and the ads 40%). It was published from September 2001 until December 2009 (from 2007 on, as the only print publication for the LGBT community), until it gave way to the magazine Company.

Originally it was only available in gay bars and saunas in Budapest but from 2005 winter on it became available in all Hungary. It included a Gay Guide in English. It was published in A6 size on 16, 48 and finally 80 pages in the first four years; from 2005 September on it was published in A5 size on 40 pages.

== See also ==
- Mások

== References and external links ==
Its website does not work anymore, but many of its archived pages are available:

- About us
