= VándorMások =

Hiking group

VándorMások (lit. “Wandering/Roaming/Roving Others”) is one of the oldest gay organizations in Hungary. It has been organizing gay-friendly hikes in the mountains easily accessible from Budapest since December 26, 1991.

== Features ==
Its leader and organizer has been “Gazsi” since the beginning. Its one-day hikes, equalling to an athletic achievement, take place once a month (except for several days’ hiking in the spring), with usually 20 or 30 people taking part. Its route has followed a four-year cycle since 1992, the individual hikes completing a continuous way, their start coinciding with the goal of the preceding one. The starting point of the four-year cycle is the brickyard at Pilisborosjenő, and the end is Budaörs. The difficulty of the hikes vary: the shortest being 9.5 km (5.9 mi) and the longest being 24.5 km (15.2 mi); sometimes there is opportunity for a shortcut. The smallest height difference is 190 m and the highest is 1040 m. The summer hikes are organised near the water so as to provide opportunity for bathing, and the December hike take place on Boxing Day and is followed by a birthday party.

Information on upcoming hikes can be found on the Internet, at the website of the gay sports organization of Hungary, Atlasz Sports Club. Hike details were also published in the LGBT magazines Mások and Labrisz and occasionally in some other, non-gay papers (such as Magyar Narancs). Apart from its route and the meeting place and time, information is available several months ahead about the expected costs, the distance, the height difference, and the arrival place and time.

== Itinerary ==
Notes:

- The letters A, B, C, D refer to subsequent years, A being 1992, 1996, 2000, 2004, 2008 etc.
- English translations of the place names are given whenever the names are meaningful in Hungarian, so as to provide clues for the type of the venues as well as give insight into their history, scenery, or other associations in the folk tradition.

| Year | Month | Route | Distance & Height difference | |
| Year | Month | Route | Full hike | Short version |
|---|---|---|---|---|
| Year “A” | May/June | Brickyard at Pilisborosjenő [Pilis Winey Eugene] > Teve-szikla [Camel Rock] > Kevély-nyereg [Haughty Saddle] > Arany-lyuk [Golden Hole] > Nagy-Kevély [Large Haughty] (534 m) > Mackó-barlang [Bear Cub's Cave] > Majdan-nyereg [“Prospective Saddle”] > Oszoly (321 m) > Pomáz, bridge. | 13 km / 530 m | 6,5 km / 280 m |
| Year “A” | July | Pomáz, bridge > Gyopár-forrás [Edelweiss Fountain] > Kis-Csikóvár [Little Foal Castle] (475 m) > Lajos-forrás [Louis Fountain] > Kármán-forrás [Kármán Fountain] > Bükkös-patak [Beech Stream] > Öreg-nyílás-völgy [Old Aperture Valley] > Pilisszentlászló [Pilis Saint Ladislaus] > Lepence-völgy [Lepence Valley] > Lepencefürdő [Lepence Bath] (Forest Sport and Thermal Bath). | 16,5 km / 480 m | 10 km / 480 m |
| Year “A” | August | Lepencefürdő [Lepence Bath] > Földes-oldal [Earthy Side] > Disznós-rét [Swine Meadow] > Nagy-Disznó-hegy [Big Swine Mountain] > Keserűs-hegy [Bitter Mountain] > Prédikálószék [Preaching Seat] (view on the Danube Bend at a height of 639 m) > Vadálló-kövek [Beasts’ Standing Stones] > Szentfa-kápolna [Holy Tree Chapel] > Dömös (beach programme in the Danube). | 12,5 km / 570 m | – |
| Year “A” | September | Dömös > Rám-szakadék [Rám Chasm] (ravine valley with ladders and handhold chains) > Három-forrás [Three Fountains] > Miklós-forrás [Nicolaus Fountain] > Thirring-sziklák [Thirring Rocks] > Dobogó-kő [Podium/Stamping/Pounding/Throbbing Stone] (Tourist Museum) > Öreg-vágás-hegy [Old Cut Mountain] > Bükkipuszta [Beech Waste] > Tölgyikrek [Oak Twins] > Salabasina > Kiskovácsi [Little Smith's Place]. | 17,5 km / 810 m | 8 km / 690 m |
| Year “A” | October | Kiskovácsi [Little Smith's Place] > Holdvilág-árok [Moonlight Ditch/Trench] (a ravine with an ancient cult place) > Lajosforrás [Louis Fountain] (snack bar) > Hosszú-rét [Long Meadow] > Lom-hegyi-nyereg [Junk Mountain Saddle] > Torina > Fagyoskatona [Freezing Soldier] > Kakashegy [Rooster's Mountain] (holiday resort) > Zsivány-sziklák [Rogue Rocks] > Joci-forrás [Joe Fountain] > Római út [Roman Road] > Két-bükkfa-nyereg [Two Beeches Saddle]. | 16,5 km / 800 m | 12 km / 530 m |
| Year “A” | November | Két-bükkfa-nyereg [Two Beeches Saddle] > Hunfalvy út [Hunnish Village Road] > Simon halála [Simon's Death] > László kúpja [Cone of Louis] (panoramic road) > Magas-hegy [High Mountain] > Szántói-nyereg [Plough-land Saddle] > Pribarinye > Hosszú-hegyi-zsomboly [Long Mountain Sinkhole] > Csobánka. | 16 km / 260 m | 10,5 km / 150 m |
| Year “A” | December | Csobánka > Csobánkai-nyereg [Csobánka Saddle] > Szentkút [Holy Fountain] (a modern devotional worship) > Budzsák > Dera-szurdok [Dera Ravine] > Pilisszentkereszt. | 9,5 km / 270 m | – |
| Year “B” | January | Pilisszentkereszt [Pilis Holy Cross] > Hutaújtelep [New Foundry Plant] > Vaskapu-völgy [Iron Gate Valley] > Fekete-kő [Black Stone] (one of the most beautiful viewpoints in Pilis) > Pilis-nyereg [Pilis Saddle] > Klastrompuszta [Cloister Waste] (Cuckoo Shelter) > Piliscsév. | 11,5 km / 350 m | – |
| Year “B” | February | Piliscsév > Pincék alatti dűlő [Field/Trail/Track Under the Cellars] > Kopanyica > Legény-barlang [Lad's Cave] > Leány-barlang [Maid’ Cave] > Vörös út [Red Road] > Pilis-nyereg [Pilis Saddle] > Pilisszentlélek [Pilis Holy Spirit] (Svejk pub) > Husztina > Égett-hárs [Burnt Lime/Linden] > Hirsch-orom [Hirsch Peak] > Hamvaskői-rét [Ash Stone Meadow] > Miklós-deák-völgy [Nicolaus Student Valley] > Pilismarót. | 17,5 km / 540 m | 8 km / 410 m |
| Year “B” | March | Pilismarót > Hosszú-hegy [Long Mountain] > Szakó-nyereg [Szakó Saddle] > Jász-hegy [ Jassic Mountain] > Dobogó-kő [Podium/Stamping/Pounding/Throbbing Stone] (a cheap snack-bar) > Két-bükkfa-nyereg [Two Beeches Saddle]. | 12,5 km / 700 m | 9 km / 630 m |
| Year “B” | April | Két-bükkfa-nyereg [Two Beeches Saddle] > Római út [Roman Road] > Ráró-hegy [Ráró Mountain] > Béla-tető [Béla Top] > Dobogó [Podium/Stamping/Pounding/Throbbing Place] > Basaharci-völgy [Pasha Battle Valley]> Szob, Börzsöny Museum. | 18 km / 190 m | 11 km / 170 m |
| Year “B” | May/June | Szob > Sukola-kereszt [Sukola Cross] > Zuvár (a medieval ruin) > Nagy-Galla (circular panorama) > Fekete-mocsár [Black Swamp] > Koldus-kút [Beggar Fountain] > Márianosztra [Virgin Mary of Ours, Latin]. | 18 km / 660 m | 12,5 km / 370 m |
| Year “B” | July | Márianosztra (Way of the Cross) > Alsó-hegy [Lower Mountain] > Kós-pallag, junction > Békás-rét [Frog Meadow] > Malom-völgy [Mill Valley] > Zebegény, church (designed by Károly Kós) > Zebegény, free beach (bathing in the Danube). | 15 km / 280 m | 6 km / 220 m |
| Year “B” | August | Zebegény (rock church, Way of the Cross chapel, national flag) > Csizmadia-völgy > Köves-mező [Stony Meadow] (view on the Danube) > Gubacsi-hálás [Gubacsi Residence] > Király-kút [King's Fountain] > Kismaros, bathing in the Danube. | 11,5 km / 320 m | 4,5 km / 220 m |
| Year “B” | September | Kismaros > Dézsmás-szőlők [Tithe Vineyards] > Gál-hegy [Gál Mountain] > Boglya-kő [Stack Stone] > Kóspallag > Érsek-forrás [Bishop Fountain]> Keselyűs-orom [Vulture Peak] > Kopasz-hegy [Bald Mountain] (unparalleled view on the Nostra Basin) > Márianosztra (Baroque Pauline Church with a Gothic sanctuary). | 19,5 km / 700 m | 8,5 km / 280 m |
| Year “B” | October | Márianosztra > Bezina-rét [Bezina Meadow] > Nagyirtás vá. [Large Clearing] > Kisirtáspuszta [Little Clearing Waste] > Vasedény kulcsosház [Iron Pot Holiday Chalet]> Ércbánya vadászház [Ore Mine Hunting Box] > Templom-völgy [Church Valley] > Vár-bérc [Castle Crag] (715 m) > Ökör-orom [Ox Peak] > Alsó-Kovács-pallag [Lower Smith pallag] > Perőcsény. | 19 km / 830 m | 13,5 km / 360 m |
| Year “B” | November | Perőcsény > Büzmöd-rét [Büzmöd Meadow] > Bánya-tető [Mine Top] > Nagy-Hideg-hegy [Large Cold Mountain] (snack bar on the 864 m high top) > Foltán-kereszt [Foltán Cross] > Spartacus kulcsosház [Spartacus Holiday Chalet] > Királyrét [King's Meadow]. | 20 km / 980 m | 16 km / 790 m |
| Year “B” | December | Királyrét [King's Meadow] > Béla-rét [Béla Meadow] > Nógrád, Way of the Cross > Nógrád train station (receiving sleepy marmots) > Hosszú-bérc [Long Crag] > Nagy-rét [Large Field] > Bika-rét [Bull Field]> Kápolna-oldal [Chapel Side] > Katalinpuszta [Catherine Waste]. | 16 km / 370 m | 9,5 km / 230 m |
| Year “C” | January | Katalinpuszta [Catherine Waste] > Csapás-hegy [Blow/Strike/Trail Mountain] > Hosszú-árok [Long Ditch/Trench] > Pihenő bisztró [Resting snack-bar] > Magas-hegy [High Mountain] > Szokolya train station > Királyrét [King's Meadow]. | 14 km / 440 m | 8 km / 290 m |
| Year “C” | February | Királyrét [King's Meadow] > Hevér-lyuk [Hevér Hole] > Ábrahám-kert [Abraham Garden] > Pokol-völgy [Hell Valley] > Szép-völgy [Nice Valley] > Templom-rét [Church Meadow] > Kisirtáspuszta [Little Clearing Waste] > Hosszú-völgy [Long Valley] > Nagybörzsöny (Miners’ Church, folklore house). | 14,5 km / 350 m | 5,5 km / 150 m |
| Year “C” | March | Nagybörzsöny (watermill) > Magyar-völgy [Hungarian Valley] > Bányapuszta [Mine Waste] > Fekete-rét [Black Meadow] > Csóványos (938 m + viewpoint) > Nyír-rét [Birch Meadow] (palace ruins) > Csehvár [Czech Castle] > Diósjenő [Walnut Eugene]. | 22,5 km / 940 m | 12,5 km / 450 m |
| Year “C” | April | Diósjenő [Walnut Eugene] > Börzsöny “blue” > Pénzásás [Money-digging] > Deszkáspuszta [Board Waste] > Dr. Frigyes Korányi resting place > Hármashatár [Triple Boundary] > Kő-máj [Stone Liver] > Hont. | 20,5 km / 460 m | 12,5 km / 240 m |
| Year “C” | May/June | Hont > Honti-szakadék [Hont Chasm] (nature reserve) > Dobogó-hegy [Podium/Stamping/Pounding/Throbbing Mountain] > Sárkány-törés [Dragon's Cleft] > Drégelyvár [Drégely Castle] > Nagyoroszi [Large Russian's Place]. | 13 km / 530 m | – |
| Year “C” | July | Nagyoroszi [Large Russian's Place] > Tér-kút [Space Fountain] > Szúnyog-forrás [Mosquite Fountain] > Kámor (661 m) > Závoz > Diósjenő [Walnut Eugene] (beach bathing for three hours). | 13 km / 490 m | – |
| Year “C” | August | Diósjenő [Walnut Eugene] > Csáng út [Csáng Road] > Foltán-kereszt [Foltán Cross] > Csóványos (938 m + viewpoint) > Magosfa [Tall Tree] > Dosnya-nyereg [Dosnya Saddle] > Godó-rét [Godó Meadow] > Kemence-patak [Oven Stream] (beach bathing for an hour). | 20 km / 850 m | 12,5 km / 240 m |
| Year “C” | September | Kemence (folklore house and local history collection) > Tejes-parlag [Milky Fallow] > Varjas-kunyhó [Crow Hut] > Bugyihó [Panties’ Snow] (633 m) > Oroszi-Závoz [Russian Závoz] > Borsosberény [Peppery Berény]. | 19,5 km / 560 m | – |
| Year “C” | October | Borsosberény [Peppery Berény] > Poshadt-parlag [Stale Cave] > Láz-lapos [Fever Flatland] > Kámori-völgy [Kámor Valley] > Jász-bükki-rét [Jassic Beach Meadow] > Mese-patak [Fairytale Stream] > Királyháza [King's House] > Esztergályos [Turner/Lather] > Szívfájó-bérc [Heart-aching Crag] > Drinó-patak [Drinó Stream] > Holló-kút [Crow Fountain] > Fidel-rét [Fidel Meadow] > Perőcsény. | 24,5 km / 1040 m | – |
| Year “C” | November | Perőcsény > Bertalan Berecz memorial plaque > VILATI holiday resort > Hamuház [Ash House] > Fekete-rét [Black Meadow] > Rakodó [Loading Station] > Páfrány út [Fern Road] > Suta-berki-nyiladék [Doe Grove Glade] > Királyrét [King's Meadow]. | 17 km / 710 m | – |
| Year “C” | December | Királyrét [King's Meadow] > Taxi-nyiladék [Taxi Glade] > Grófi út [Counts’ Road] > Magastaxi turistaház [High Taxi Tourist Hostel] > Kammerhof > Hálás-bérc [Residence Crag] > Kisinóc tourist hostel. | 12,5 km / 520 m | – |
| Year “D” | January | Kisinóc tourist hostel > Érsek-tisztás [Bishop's Clearing] > Nagyirtás-puszta [Large Cleaning Waste] > Nagy-Koppány [Large Koppány] > Farkas-völgy [Wolf Valley] > Nagybörzsöny. | 13 km / 440 m | 9,5 km / 250 m |
| Year “D” | February | Nagybörzsöny (Saint Stephen Church from the Árpád age) > Rustok-hegy [Rustok Mountain] > János-forrás [John Fountain] > Nagy-Hideg-hegy [Large Cold Mountain] (snack-bar) > Vasfazék-völgy [Iron Pot Valley] > Királyrét [King's Meadow]. | 16 km / 690 m | – |
| Year “D” | March | Királyrét [King's Meadow] > Széles-mező [Wide Meadow] > Béla-rét [Béla Meadow] > Saj-kút [Saj Fountain] > Foltán-kereszt [Foltán Cross] > Hosszú-bérc [Long Crag] > Boros-hegy [Winey Mountain] > Sós-hegy [Salty Mountain] > Szokolya, Calvinist church. | 20 km / 630 m | 15 km / 520 m |
| Year “D” | April | Szokolya > Fekete-hegy [Black Mountain] > Kopanyica > Pusztatorony [Waste Tower] > Törökmező [Turkish Meadow] (tourist hostel) > Csernák-kút [Csernák Fountain] > Köves-mező [Stony Meadow] (this is where the view of Visegrád is the most beautiful) > Julianus barát torony [Tower of Brother Julian] (double panorama) > Szent Mihály-hegy [Mountain of Saint Michael] (484 m) > Remete-barlang [Hermit's Cave] (domicile of Russian Bazilite monks until the late 19th century) > Dömös crossing, train station: a tearful goodbye to Börzsöny. | 21 km / 690 m | 7,5 km / 260 m |
| Year “D” | May/June | Dömös (“gate of Pilis”) > Szőke-forrás völgye [Valley of the Blond Fountain] > Király-kúti-nyereg [Saddle of the King's Fountain] > Varga-lósz > Tüskés-hegy [Prickly Mountain] > Pilisszentlászló [the village located at the highest elevation of Visegrád Mountain) > Szent László-völgy [Saint Ladislaus Valley] > Apát-kúti-völgy [Abbey Fountain Valley] > Visegrád: the royal palace by the professional guidance of a nice acquaintance. | 22 km / 530 m | 12 km / 530 m |
| Year “D” | July | Visegrád (citadel) > Nagy-Villám [Large Lightning] (30 minutes at the summer bob sleigh run) > Barát-halom [Friend/Friar Mount] > Kis-bükk-tető [Lesser Beech Top] (548 m) > Vörös-kő [Red Stone] (an excellent viewpoint) > Leányfalu [Girls’ Village] (beach bathing). | 15,5 km / 650 m | – |
| Year “D” | August | Leányfalu [Girls’ Village] > Rekettyés-tó [Broomy Lake] > Álló-rét [Standing Lake] > Lőrinc-laposa [Lawrence's Flatland] > Leány-kút [Girl's Fountain] > Tahitótfalu [Tahi Slovak Village] (bathing in the Danube). | 11 km / 430 m | – |
| Year “D” | September | Tahitótfalu [Tahi Slovak Village] > Cseresznyés-völgy [Cherry Valley] > Sasfészek [Eagle's Nest] > Pap-rét [Priest Meadow] > Hegytető [Mountain Top] > Szentendre [Saint Andrew], open air folklore museum. | 15 km / 500 m | 10,5 km / 500 m |
| Year “D” | October | Szentendre [Saint Andrew] (vehicle exhibition of the Budapest Transport Company, Margit Kovács Museum) > Püspökmajor housing estate (Way of the Cross) > Dobos-hegy [Drummer's Mountain] > Kő-hegy [Stone Mountain] (panorama) > Görbe-hajtás [Crooked Shoot] > Bölcső-hegy [Cradle Mountain] (588 m + viewpoint) > Lajos-forrás [Louis Fountain] > Vasas-szakadék [Iron Chasm] > Szentendre [Saint Andrew], Anna-völgy [Anne Valley]. | 16,5 km / 610 m | – |
| Year “D” | November | Szentendre [Saint Andrew], Anna-völgy [Anne Valley] > Dömörkapu [Dömör Gate] > Kárpát-forrás [Carpathian Fountain] > Király-kút [King's Fountain] > Miklós-forrás [Nicolaus Fountain] > Szakó-nyereg [Szakó Saddle] > Téry út [Téry Road] > Dömös. | 19 km / 380 m | 9,5 km / 450 m |
| Year “D” | December | Dömös > Lukács-árok [Lucas Ditch/Trench] > Szakó-nyereg [Szakó Saddle] > Husztina (remnants of a Pauline cloister) > Pilisszentlélek (Svejk pub) > Sasfészek kulcsosház [Eagle's Nest Holiday Chalet] > Öreg-szirt [Old Crag] > Kesztölc. | 17,5 km / 770 m | 9,5 km / 450 m |
| Year “A” | January | Kesztölc > Szállás-berek [Residence Grove] > Sziklák alatti dűlő [Field/Trail/Track Under the Rocks] > Klastrompuszta [Cloister Waste] (shelter) > Csévi-nyereg [Csévi Saddle] > Klotild-barlang [Clotild Cave] > Piliscsaba, Klotildliget [Clotild Park]. | 14,5 km / 450 m | 10,5 km / 340 m |
| Year “A” | February | Piliscsaba (getting started to Buda Mountains!) > Kőris-völgy [Ash-tree Valley] > Bükkös-árok [Beech Ditch/Trench] > Nagy-szénás [Large Hayplace] (a top at a height of 550 m with a circular panorama; a strictly protected area, because Dolomitic Flax is native only there in the world) > Felső-Zsíros-hegy [Upper Greasy Mountain] > Zsíros-hegy [Greasy Mountain] > Kerek-hegy [Round Mountain] > Kakukk-hegy [Cuckoo Mountain] > Budapest, Jegenye-völgy [Poplar Valley] | 15,5 km / 380 m | 11,5 km / 360 m |
| Year “A” | March | Alsó-Jegenye-völgy [Lower Poplar Valley] > Kötők-padja [Knitters’ Bench] > Guckler Károly út [Károly Guckler Road] > Fekete salak út [Black Slag Road] > Fenyőgyöngye [Pines’ Pearl] (a good half an hour's rest in the restaurant noted for being gay-friendly) > Árpád-kilátó [Árpád Viewpoint] > Glück Frigyes út > Hűvösvölgy [Cool/Cold Valley]. | 16,5 km / 380 m | 10,5 km / 260 m |
| Year “A” | April | Hűvösvölgy [Cool/Cold Valley] > Kis-Hárs-hegy (English: Little Lime Hill/Linden Mountain) (362 m + viewpoint) > Nagy-Hárs-hegy (English: Great Lime Hill/Linden Mountain) (454 m + viewpoint) > Szépjuhászné [Nice Mistress Shepherd] > János-hegy (János Hill) (527 m + viewpoint) > Makkosmária [Acorn Mary] (a historic devotional church) > Csíki-hegyek [Csíki Mountains] > Török-ugrató [Turk-hopping Place] > Budaörs. | 18,5 km / 690 m | 10,5 km / 480 m |

== See also ==
- Mások magazine

== Resources ==
- Routes of former hikes (a whole cycle)
- Programmes for the year 2002
- Programmes for the year 2003
- Programmes for the year 2004
