= Hungarian LGBT Alliance =

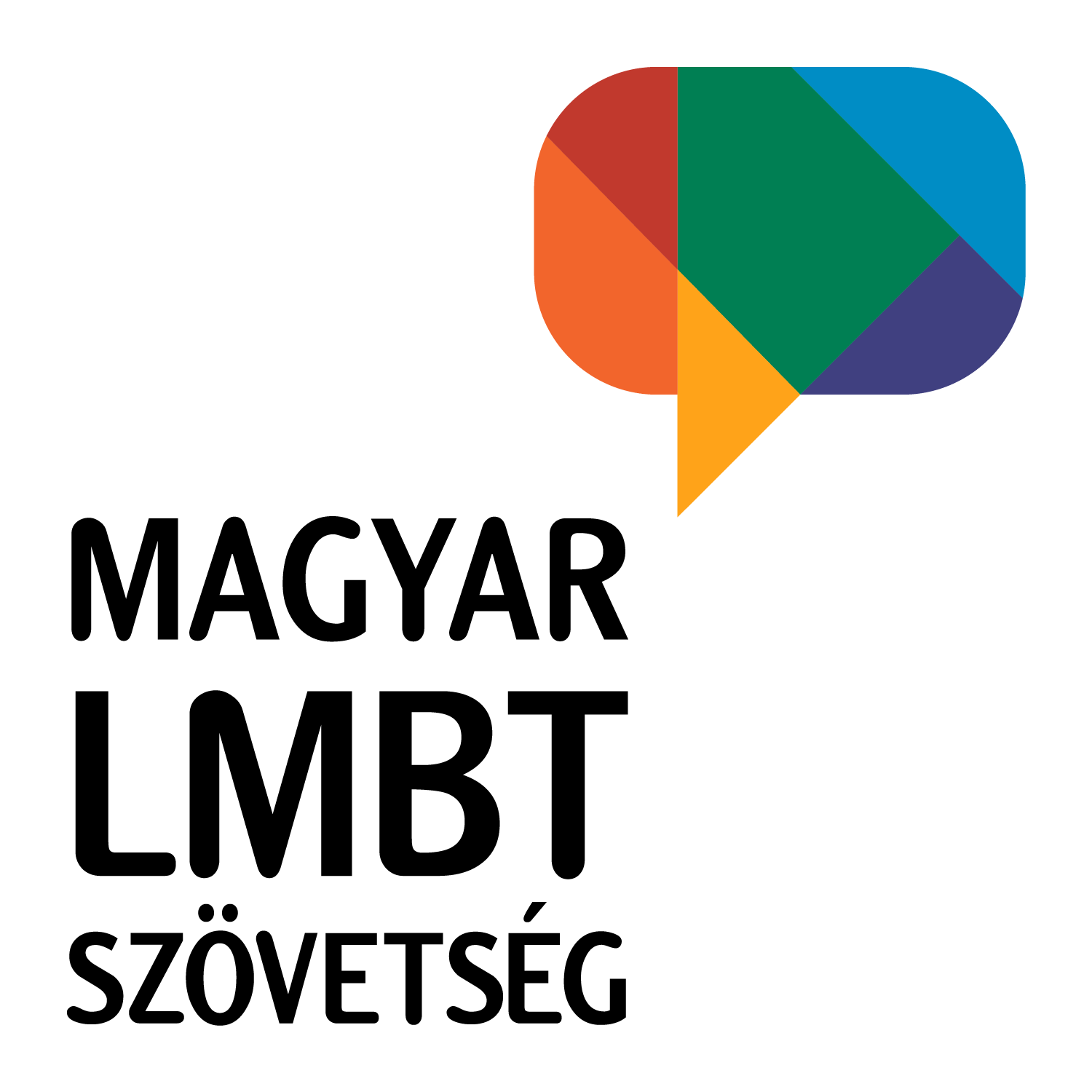
- Formation: 2009
- Purpose: LGBT rights
- Headquarters: Budapest, Hungary
- Region served: Hungary
- Website: lmbtszovetseg.hu

The Hungarian LGBT Alliance is an umbrella organization that brings together gay, lesbian, bisexual and transgender organizations in Hungary. It was founded on January 25, 2009, and currently has 11 member organizations.

== Member organizations ==
- Atlasz Lesbian, Gay, Bisexual and Transgender Sport Association
- Háttér Society
- Hungarian Asexual Community
- Labrisz Lesbian Association
- Patent Association
- Partiscum Association for the LGBT Community in Szeged
- qLit - Lesbian Magazine and Event Organizing Association
- Szabadnem Association
- Szimpozion LGBT Youth Association
- Rainbow Mission Foundation
- Rainbow Families Foundation

== Activities ==
In 2016, similarly to other NGOs in the country, the Alliance campaigned for an invalid vote in the referendum on refugee quotas.
