= Háttér Society =

Hungarian LGBTQI association

- Formation: 1995
- Purpose: LGBT rights
- Headquarters: Budapest, Hungary
- Region served: Hungary
- Website: hatter.hu

Háttér Society (Háttér Társaság in Hungarian, háttér means background) is an NGO representing LGBTQI people in Hungary. It operates a telephone hotline, a legal aid service, an HIV/AIDS prevention program and an archive. Besides its core activities, Háttér participates in research and training projects and lobbies for the rights of LGBT people through legal change, including against the 2021 Hungarian anti-LGBT law. Háttér is a founding member of the Hungarian LGBT Alliance, and an active member of ILGA-Europe.

== History ==
Háttér was founded in 1995.

== Activities ==
Háttér Society ran a survey of 2,000 people showing that 42% thought about suicide while 30% had attempted it. Suicide thoughts occurred mostly among teenagers, about 64% of respondents, Háttér said. The Society has conducted other surveys and research, in part funded by ILGA Europe. They have written shadow ("parallel") reports for the United Nations Human Rights Council Universal Periodic Review (UPR) in 2015 and 2021.

The Society's lobbying activities include efforts in 2017 to achieve inheritance tax equality for gay widows and widowers. In 2018, Háttér Society released a short film intended for parents of gay children.

After the Orbán IV government passed the Hungarian anti-LGBT law in 2021, Háttér and Amnesty International were among a group of NGOs condemning the law in a joint letter. Háttér stated that discrimination and violence against LGBT people increased after the law was passed.

Háttér Society runs its own archive, the Háttér Archive.
