= Mások =

Defunct Hungarian gay magazine

Mások (Hungarian pronunciation: [ˈmaːʃok], "Others") was Hungary's first LGBTQ magazine, a social, cultural and human rights monthly, which existed for more than 17 years, from April 1991 to June 2008 (excluding its first unofficial issues, which were published from 1989 onwards). Its 200th issue was printed in November 2007. The word "más" ("other," plural mások) is a Hungarian term that may refer to gay people.

From the early 2000s, it appeared on 76 pages (in B5 size) with news, reports, interviews, reviews, short stories, programmes, classifieds, and advertisements. Including information related to the entire LGBT community and aimed at the lesbian and transgender audience as well, it was mostly bought by gay men (partly because of its male softcore pictures).

Mások was available throughout Hungary, at all major newsagents (not usually in the shopwindow, though). Issues are stored and available in the archives of the two major Hungarian libraries (National Széchényi Library and Metropolitan Ervin Szabó Library), as well as IHLIA LGBT Heritage in Amsterdam, the Netherlands), and it was occasionally a point of reference for other newspapers.

== See also ==
- List of magazines in Hungary
- Company (LGBT magazine)
- Na végre!
- VándorMások
