= 2026 in Hungary =

- Decades: 2000s; 2010s; 2020s; 2030s
- See also: Other events of 2026; List of years in Hungary

Events in the year 2026 in Hungary.

== Incumbents ==
Incumbents
Position	Person	Party	Notes
President	Tamás Sulyok	Independent	until 19 July
President	Ágnes Forsthoffer (acting)	TISZA	20 July–19 Aug
President	András Baka	Independent	since 19 Aug
Prime Minister	Viktor Orbán	Fidesz	until 9 May
Prime Minister	Péter Magyar	TISZA	since 9 May
Speaker of the National Assembly	László Kövér	Fidesz	until 9 May
Speaker of the National Assembly	Ágnes Forsthoffer	TISZA	since 9 May

== Elections ==
2026 Hungarian parliamentary election 12 April 2026
Party	Leader
Party vote
TISZA Péter Magyar		53.18%
Fidesz–KDNP Viktor Orbán		38.61%
MHM László Toroczkai		5.63%
Others		2.58%
Seats
TISZA		141
Fidesz–KDNP		52
MHM		6

2026 Hungarian presidential election
Ballot →	11 August 2026
Required majority →	133 out of 199
András Baka (Ind.) Nominations: TISZA	140 / 199
Against	6 / 199
Absent	53 / 199

== Events ==
=== January ===
- 5 January – Viktor Orbán holds an international press conference, followed by a press conference of Péter Magyar.
- 6 January – Péter Magyar publishes an open letter for Slovak PM Robert Fico, against laws penalizing questioning the Beneš decrees. He leaves a blank space for the signature of Viktor Orbán.
- 12 January –
  - Hungary grants asylum to former Polish justice minister Zbigniew Ziobro, who is wanted on charges of corruption.
  - Slovak President Peter Pellegrini criticizes Péter Magyar over his use of the term Felvidék. Magyar rebukes him in his answer.
- 13 January – President Tamás Sulyok sets the date of the upcoming parliamentary election to 12 April.
- 15 January – György Gattyán's Solution Movement declares not to participate on the 2026 election.
- 17 January –
  - István Kapitány, the former vice-president of Shell, debuts as Tisza's economy and energy expert.
  - Parties 2RK and LMP declare they will not participate on the 2026 election.
- 19 January – Polymarket is blocked in Hungary.
- 20 January – The Szőlő Street Correction Facility is closed.
- 22 January – János Lázár at a Lázárinfó in Balatonalmádi talks about how Roma people (as opposed to migrants) form an "internal reserve" workforce for tasks such as toilet cleaning, tasks that "Hungarian voters" are unwilling to do. He apologizes for his statement on 24 January.
- 24 January – Anita Orbán debuts as Tisza's foreign policy expert.
- 26 January – Hungary summons the Ukrainian ambassador after Viktor Orbán accuses Kyiv of interfering in the upcoming general election.
- 27 January – News about MSZP not participating in the upcoming election are published in Magyar Nemzet, but party leader Imre Komjáthi claims a decision has not yet been made.
- 28 January – Prosecutors charge Budapest mayor Gergely Karácsony for organizing Budapest Pride last year, despite it being banned by the law on assembly.
- 29 January – Katalin Cseh declares that their Hungarian Humanists' Party will not run in the 2026 election.

=== February ===
- 3 February – The government uses its emergency powers to terminate its ongoing lawsuits with municipal governments (including Budapest) over the solidarity contribution tax for 2023-2025.
- 4 February – Budapest Complex: A court in Budapest sentences German activist Maja T. to eight years in prison for participating in assaults on attendees of a far-right rally in Budapest in 2023, following her extradition from Germany despite later objections by the Federal Constitutional Court.
- 5 February – US president Donald Trump endorses Orbán for the 2026 election.
- 7 February –
  - Tisza publishes its election program.
  - Dialogue announces it will not run in the 2026 election.
- 8 February – Fidesz wins the municipal by-election in Balmazújváros 7th constituency with 47.09%.
- 9 February – An article published on Telex on the unhealthy work conditions in Samsung's battery factory in Göd leads to a political scandal.
- 10 February – A mysterious photo of an empty bedroom appears on the website radnaimark.hu Tisza vice-president Márk Radnai denies any relation to the photo. Péter Magyar claims Fidesz might be threatening him with revenge porn.
- 12 February – Péter Magyar claims he had a honey trap affair with Evelin Vogel on August 2, 2024, in the same room from radnaimark.hu, and claims they were trying to compromise him by placing drugs in the room, but he did not partake in it.
- 13 February – Three people are killed in a building fire in Budakeszi.
- 13-14 February – Péter Magyar attends the Munich Security Conference, meeting with Polish, German, Austrian and Croatian leaders.
- 14 February – Orbán holds his annual "Year in Review" event. He claims Tisza represents the interests of western capital, especially Shell and Erste.
- 15 February –
  - Greenpeace organizes a protest in front of the Foreign Ministry, against the Göd factory.
  - Péter Magyar holds his "Year in Review" event. This marks the beginning of his election campaign.
- 16 February – US secretary of state Marco Rubio visits Hungary, holding a press conference with Orbán.
- 18 February – Hungary suspends exports of diesel fuel to Ukraine, citing attacks on the Druzhba pipeline.
- 19 February – Vsquare uncovers government plans to privatize land adjacent to Budapest railway stations.
- 20 February – MSZP announces it will not run in the upcoming election
- 21 February – Collection of signatures begins for the election.
- 23 February – Slovakia joins Hungary in blocking the European Union’s 20th sanctions package against Russia, preventing its adoption ahead of the fourth anniversary of the full-scale invasion of Ukraine.
- 24 February – Orbán announces that Hungary has ended all support for Ukraine, including through European Union framework, until Ukraine resumes oil transfers via the Druzhba pipeline.
- 25 February – Orbán orders the deployment of additional security forces across energy facilities, citing a Ukrainian plot to disrupt energy supplies.
- 27 February – Freight traffic resumes on the renovated Budapest–Belgrade railway

=== March ===
- 4 March – Russia releases two dual Hungarian-Ukrainian nationals who had been captured while fighting for Ukraine following negotiations between Russian president Vladimir Putin and Hungarian foreign minister Péter Szijjártó.
- 5 March –
  - Ukraine's President Volodymyr Zelenskyy says he would prefer not to repair the Druzhba pipeline.
  - Ukraine accuses Hungary of hostage-taking and theft following the detention of two vans and seven staff of the Ukrainian bank Oschadbank by Hungarian authorities while transiting cash through to Austria.
- 6 March – The European Commission rebukes Ukrainian President Volodymyr Zelenskyy over remarks that Hungary interpreted as a threat against Prime Minister Orbán.
- 9 March – Orbán announces that Hungary will introduce a price cap on gasoline and diesel.
- 12 March – Ukrainian former MP and Security Service of Ukraine (SBU) officer Hryhoriy Omelchenko makes a threat to Orbán.
- 14 March – The Hungarian Defence Forces reports that Hungarian soldiers have safely left the Erbil airbase in Iraq due to the ongoing Iran War.
- 15 March – A Pro-Fidesz "peace march" is held from Elvis Presley tér to Kossuth Square, where Orbán, János Lázár and Péter Szijjártó hold speeches. Péter Magyar holds a "national march" at Heroes' Square. People associated with Fidesz run into the crowd of Magyar's march, and hold up a Ukrainian flag. Minor rallies are also held by Mi Hazánk at Corvin Köz. and MKKP at Liberty Bridge
- 16 March – Orbán begins holding in-person DPK rallies across the country, starting in Kaposvár.
- 17 March – Hungary and Slovakia sign an agreement to build a 127 km (79 mi)-long oil pipeline running from Százhalombatta to Bratislava.
- 19 March – Gergely Gulyás claims Hungary would consider sending soldiers to the Strait of Hormuz if Donald Trump asked so.
- 20 March – Rita Kopping, DK candidate for Bács-Kiskun 1st constituency withdraws from the race, and is subsequently expelled from her party.
- 21 March –
  - CPAC Hungary is held.
  - The Washington Post reports that Russia might stage an assassination attempt against Orbán to improve his election chances. They also claim foreign minister Péter Szijjártó is in regular correspondence with his Russian counter-part Sergey Lavrov during EU meetings.
- 23 March – Journalist Szabolcs Panyi leaks a conversation from February 2020 between foreign ministers Szijjártó and Lavrov appearing to show Szijjártó asking for Russian help on behalf of Peter Pellegrini for the upcoming Slovak parliamentary elections.
- 25 March –
  - Orbán says Hungary will gradually suspend gas supplies to Ukraine until Russian oil transit through the Druzhba pipeline resumes, citing disruptions to deliveries crossing Ukraine.
  - DK withdraws three of their candidates running in Budapest 6th, 8th, and Nógrád 1st constituencies. Independent candidate Tímea Szabó also withdraws in Budapest 11th constituency.
  - Direct36 publishes a video of Bence Szabó, a police officer for the National Bureau of Investigation, who claims that Hungarian secret services attempted to sabotage Tisza's IT system.
- 26 March –
  - Independent documentary The Price of the Vote (A szavazat ára) accuses the government of mass voter intimidation.
  - Sándor Szabó, an independent candidate, withdraws from the election in Csongrád-Csanád 1st constituency.
- 27 March – Viktor Orbán is confronted by counter-protestors at his rally in Győr.
- 30 March – Dániel "Gundalf" Hrabócz, the former Tisza IT specialist targeted by the government, gives an interview to 444.
- 31 March – VSquare publishes voice recording showing Szijjártó acting on behalf of Lavrov to get Alisher Usmanov removed from the EU sanctions list.

=== April ===
- 2 April –
  - Szilveszter Pálinkás gives an interview to Telex about dissatisfaction in the Hungarian Defence Forces. He claims Hungary's mission to Chad was motivated by the religious visions of Gáspár Orbán.
  - MKKP withdraws 3 of their candidates (Veszprém 3rd, Budapest 14th, Nógrád 1st)
- 4 April – Ágnes Kunhalmi withdraws from the election in Budapest 8th constituency.
- 5 April –
  - The renovated Citadella is opened.
  - A bag of explosives were found near the TurkStream gas pipeline at Trešnjevac, Serbia. Next day, Orbán holds a press conference at the Hungarian–Serbian border.
- 7 April –
  - US Vice President JD Vance visits Hungary. He has a press conference and attends a rally with Prime Minister Viktor Orbán.
  - Bloomberg leaks the transcript of a phone call between Viktor Orbán and Vladimir Putin in which Orbán declares himself "at his service", comparing himself to a mouse to Putin's lion.
- 10 April – Róbert Puzsér organizes a concert of anti-government musicians to Hősök tere, Budapest
- 11 April – Fidesz holds its campaign closing rally at Szentháromság tér, Budapest, Tisza holds one in Debrecen
- 12 April – 2026 Hungarian parliamentary election: The opposition Tisza Party led by Péter Magyar wins a landslide against Viktor Orbán's Fidesz–KDNP, ending nearly 16 years of consecutive rule.
- 14 April – Ukraine's President Volodymyr Zelenskyy says the Druzhba pipeline will be repaired by the end of April.
- 21 April – The European Court of Justice rules in European Commission v Hungary that the Hungarian anti-LGBTQ law violates EU rules.

=== May ===
- 7 May – Magyar meets Giorgia Meloni in Rome
- 9 May – Péter Magyar is inaugurated as prime minister.
- 11-12 May – Parliamentary hearings of the ministers of the upcoming Magyar Government.
- 12 May – The Magyar Government is sworn in.
- 14 May –
  - The state of emergency that begun during the COVID-19 pandemic then continued due to the invasion of Ukraine, comes to an end. Decrees made during the emergency period were previously elevated to laws.
  - Foreign minister Anita Orbán summons the Russian ambassador over the attacks on Zakarpattia Oblast, Ukraine the previous day.
  - The outgoing ministers hand over their ministries to the Magyar Government
- 19 May
  - Bálint Ruff becomes deputy prime minister alongside Anita Orbán.
  - Files on the Katalin Novák presidential pardon scandal are released.
- 19 - 21 May – Magyar's first foreign trip as Prime Minister, to Poland and Austria
- 21 May – One person is killed while seven others are injured in an explosion at a petrochemical facility of MOL in Tiszaújváros.
- 22 May – The ongoing process of Hungary leaving the International Criminal Court is reversed.
- 24 May – All 55 state secretaries of the Magyar Government are appointed
- 26 May – Director of Counter Terrorism Centre, János Hajdu, is dismissed.
- 28 May – The last print issue of Népszava is published, as their distribution contract with Mediaworks is terminated.
- 29 May – €16.4 billion of EU funds are unfrozen for Hungary.
- 30 May
  - A bus carrying athletes crashes into a tree near Hird, Baranya County, killing the driver and injuring 23 passengers.
  - 2026 UEFA Champions League final
- 31 May – The deadline set by Magyar for President Tamás Sulyok to resign. He refuses to do so, claiming he will appeal to the Venice Commission.

=== June ===
- 2-3 June – Magyar visits German Chancellor Friedrich Merz in Berlin and French President Emmanuel Macron in Paris
- 3 June – Magyar declares he reached an agreement with Ukraine over securing minority rights for the Hungarian minority in Zakarpattia Oblast. As a result, Hungary greenlights talks on the first EU accession chapters for Ukraine and Moldova.
- 4 June –
  - Charges against Gergely Karácsony over the 2025 Pride march are dropped.
  - Óbuda scandal: the Public prosecutor's office orders the arrest of 8 Budapest politicians, all from Fidesz, MSZP or Momentum, over a corruption case in Budapest park management.
- 5 June – Fidesz and Mi Hazánk supporters protest against the EU migration pact. They march from Kodály Körönd to Kossuth tér.
- 6 June – The government restricts the issuance of residence permits for guest workers.
- 7 June – Protest in front of Sándor Palace, against the removal of Sulyok and other state officials.
- 9 June – Parliament passes a package of anti-corruption measures required to unlock RRF funds.
- 12 June – A minibus collides with a truck that had been stalled on a highway near Győr due to an earlier collision that left one person dead, killing an additional seven people.
- 13 June – Viktor Orbán is reelected as leader of Fidesz.
- 15 June – Parliament passes the 16th Amendment to the Fundamental Law, establishing an eight-year term limit for the Prime Minister. It also establishes the legal basis for abolishing kekva foundations and the Sovereignty Protection Office.
- 19 June –
  - The European Council approves Hungary's RRF plan.
  - The government lifts a ban on 12 Ukrainian newspapers that was imposed during Orbán's premiership in 2025.
  - Seven judges of the Constitutional Court refuse to participate in the upcoming hearting of Sulyok's petition against his removal. In lieu of quorum, Péter Polt removes the case from the court's agenda.
- 22 June – Magyar announces the 17th Amendment to the Fundamental Law, dubbed "Operation Cleansing Fire", aimed to remove Sulyok from power.
- 27 June – Budapest Pride is held.
- 30 June –
  - 2026 European heatwaves: The highest recorded temperature in Hungary is taken in Szécsény, measuring 42 °C (108 °F).
  - Parliament abolishes the Sovereignty Protection Office, effective July 15.

=== July ===
- 7 July – M1 suspends news broadcasts amid government efforts to overhaul the public broadcasting sector on neutrality grounds.
- 9 July – Thousands of people protest in Budapest against attempts by Prime Minister Magyar to oust president Sulyok.
- 13 July –
  - Parliament passes the 17th Amendment to the Fundamental Law, allowing for the removal of President Sulyok and Constitutional Court President Péter Polt.
  - Gergely Gulyás resigns as the leader of Fidesz's parliamentary group.
- 15 July –
  - Péter Szijjártó resigns his parliamentary mandate to work for BYD.
  - Orsolya Ferencz, supported by Tibor Navracsics, declares the need for a new political community outside Fidesz.
- 18 July – President Sulyok signs the 17th constitutional amendment, ending his term as head of state.
- 20 July –
  - Speaker of the National Assembly Ágnes Forsthoffer becomes acting President.
  - Chess grandmaster Judit Polgár declines Magyar's offer for the presidency.
- 21 July – Prosecutors seize Fidesz servers in relation to the Óbuda scandal.
- 22 July –
  - Chief Prosecutor Gábor Bálint Nagy resigns.
  - Minister of Transport and Investment Dávid Vitézy unveils a 3.550 trillion forint railway development program named after Gábor Baross.
- 26 July – MTVA officially closes down after a vote.
- 28 July – Parliament passes the law establishing the National Asset Recovery and Protection Office (NVVH), which comes into effect next day.
- 30 July – The output of the Paks Nuclear Power Plant is reduced due to the extreme low water levels on the Danube. The government introduces emergency restrictions to cope with the resulting electricity shortage.

=== August ===
- 1 August –
  - The Godisa–Komló railway line re-opens.
  - The National Transportation Center (OKK) is established
- 8 August – Tisza nominates András Baka, former president of the Supreme Court of Hungary, to be President of the Republic.
- 11 August – 2026 Hungarian presidential election: András Baka is elected President by the National Assembly.
- 16 August – A bus carrying pilgrims returning from Bosnia-Herzegovina to Poland overturns and veers off the M3 into a ditch near Mezőkeresztes, killing 12 people and injuring 47 others.
- 17 August – The Constitutional Court rejects the complaints of Fidesz-KDNP over the removal of Sulyok
- 19 August – András Baka is inaugurated as President.
- 20 August – János Lázár resigns his parliamentary mandate.
- 24 August – A Saab JAS 39 Gripen fighter jet of the Hungarian Air Force crashes near Szolnok. The pilot ejects safely.
- 28 August – Anna Unger is elected president of NVVH.
- 31 August –
  - The rights and obligations of former kekva foundations are transferred to the state, except for those involved in higher education.
  - Dávid Vitézy declares Hungary has passed all conditions for unlocking its EU Recovery Funds by the deadline.

=== September ===
- 1 September – The Nyékládháza–Tiszaújváros railway line re-opens.
- 8 September – Ten Russian diplomats are expelled by Hungary for "unacceptable activities".
- 11–13 September – The inaugural World Athletics Ultimate Championship is held in Budapest.
- 15 September – Mária Schmidt is dismissed as head of the House of Terror, the museum temporarily closes
- 28 September –
  - Parliamentary immunity for Prime Minister Magyar and two ministers (Miklós Seszták and Balázs Hankó) from the Orbán era is suspended by the National Assembly.
  - Seszták and Hankó are taken into custody
  - Parliament rejects President Baka's nomination of Zoltán Szathmáry for prosecutor general
- 29 September – Former chief prosecutor Pál Fürcht says in an open letter that Orbán personally ordered the seizure of the Ukrainian cash couriers in March 2026.

=== October ===
- 1 October –
  - As per the 17th Amendment, counties are re-named from vármegye to megye, and their comissioners from főispán to kormánymegbízott.
  - The Government and Budapest City Hall comes to an agreement over their financial disputes. The city gains a one-off 120 Billion Forints in exchange for dropping their lawsuits. The state gains 50% control over BKK. District mayors protest over plans to strip them of parking revenues.
- 6 October – Plans for the introduction of a wealth tax and the new kata taxation are published
- 9 October – The government halts the construction of the Southern Ring Rail, as EU funds for the project were suspended over suspicion of collusion.
- 13 October –
  - The National Assembly passes an amendment repealing most provisions of the anti-LGBTQ child protection law that was previously passed during Prime Minister Viktor Orbán's tenure in 2021. Minutes after the vote, the EU releases €4.2 billion in funds frozen to Hungary.
  - The EU Council closes the conditionality procedure against Hungary, releasing €4.2bn and reopening Erasmus+ and Horizon Europe
- 19-20 October – Magyar and finance minister András Kármán outline the 2027 budget
- 21 October – György Matolcsy is taken into custody, and an arrest warrant is issued for his son Ádám Matolcsy.
- 23 October –
  - 70th anniversary of the 1956 revolution: Ursula von der Leyen and António Costa address a ceremonial sitting of Parliament; Magyar speaks on Kossuth tér; Fidesz holds a separate march while Orbán is spotted in Paris
  - Matolcsy is remanded for a month
- 26 October – The government reaches an agreement unlocking €254 Million from the EEA and Norway Grants
- 30 October – The government submits the 2027 budget bill

=== November ===
- 2 November –
  - The foreign ministry dismisses Botond Feledy as head of the Hungarian Institute of International Affairs, citing an undisclosed working relationship with the previous government.
  - Wizz Air Flight 4302 traveling from London to Sofia makes an emergency landing at Budapest Ferenc Liszt International Airport after it is subjected to a bomb threat that was subsequently found to be false.
- 3 November – Parliament elects Péter Fejes prosecutor general
- 4 November – The publishing of communist era state security files online beings. Former deputy speaker Sándor Lezsák is wrongly listed as an informant; the archive blames an IT error and apologises, as does Magyar.
- 6 November – Three commercial flights are intercepted by the Hungarian Air Force.
- 10 November – Áron Orbán, the younger brother of former Prime Minister Viktor Orbán, is arrested by police for suspected human trafficking and influence peddling.
- 11 November – Judit Varga testifies before the parliamentary inquiry into the Schadl–Völner scandal
- 12 November –
  - Magyar announces a package of women's rights legislation, including the ratification of the Istanbul Convention
  - Vitézy and Karácsony agree to transform BKK into a regional transport authority for the entire Budapest Agglomeration from 1 January 2027
- 14 November – Nearly $20 million in cash is recovered by authorities as part of a bribery investigation into former minister Miklos Seszták; some of the money was hidden inside farm buildings and warehouses and buried in forests.

== Holidays ==
- 1 January – New Year's Day
- 15 March – Revolution Day
- 3 April – Good Friday
- 5 April – Easter Monday
- 1 May – International Workers' Day
- 25 May – Whit Monday
- 20 August – State Foundation Day
- 23 October – 1956 Revolution Memorial Day
- 1 November – All Saints' Day
- 25 December – Christmas Day
- 26 December – Boxing Day

== Art and entertainment ==
- List of Hungarian submissions for the Academy Award for Best International Feature Film

== Deaths ==
- 2 January – Lajos Rovátkay, 92, harpsichordist and musicologist.
- 5 January – Miklós Dudás, 34, Olympic sprint canoeist (2012), world champion (2014).
- 6 January – Béla Tarr, 70, film director (Sátántangó, Werckmeister Harmonies, The Turin Horse).
- 26 January – Béla Lattmann, 65, jazz bassist.
- 31 January – Miklós Fenyő, 78, singer, songwriter and musician.
- 6 February – Éva Keleti, 94, photographer.
- 14 March – József Benke, 88, historian.
- 29 March – Ádám Nádasdy, 79, linguist, poet
- 6 May – László Fazekas, 78, football player (Újpesti Dózsa, Royal Antwerp, national team) and manager, Olympic champion (1968).
- 2 June – Eszter Láng, 78, painter.
- 5 June – Tamás Horváth, 35, footballer (Kaposvári Rákóczi).
- 13 June – Balazs Martos, 73, electrical engineer.
- 14 June – Győző Somogyi, 83, graphic artist and painter.
- 26 June – Mihály Pénzes, 75, footballer (Győri ETO, national team).
- 26 August – Péter Nádas, 83, writer (A Book of Memories, Parallel Stories, The End of a Family Story).

== See also ==
- 2026 in the European Union
- 2026 in Europe
