= Gergő =

Gergő is a Hungarian masculine given name of the given name Gregory. Notable people with the name include:

- Gergő Beliczky (born 1990), Hungarian footballer
- Gergő Bese (born 1983), Hungarian Roman Catholic priest and social influencer
- Gergő Bruckmann (born 1995), Hungarian modern pentathlete
- Gergő Cseri (born 1982), Hungarian footballer
- Gergő Fazekas (born 2003), Hungarian handball player
- Gergő Fekete (born 2000), Hungarian water polo player
- Gergő Gengeliczki (born 1993), Hungarian footballer
- Gergő Gőcze (born 1990), Hungarian footballer
- Gergő Gohér (born 1987), Hungarian footballer
- Gergő Gyönyörű (born 2001), Hungarian footballer
- Gergő Gyurkits (born 2002), Hungarian footballer
- Gergő Holdampf (born 1994), Hungarian footballer
- Gergő Irimiás (born 2001), Hungarian footballer
- Gergő Iváncsik (born 1981), Hungarian handball player
- Gergő Jeremiás (born 1985), Hungarian football manager and player
- Gergő Kis (born 1988), Hungarian freestyle swimmer
- Gergő Kiss (swimmer, born 1977), Hungarian swimmer
- Gergő Kocsis (born 1994), Hungarian footballer
- Gergő Kovács (born 1989), Hungarian footballer
- Gergő Lovrencsics (born 1988), Hungarian footballer
- Gergő Menyhért (born 1989), Hungarian footballer
- Gergő Nagy, multiple people
- Gergő Németh, Hungarian canoeist
- Gergő Oláh, multiple people
- Gergő Ominger (born 2002), Hungarian footballer
- Gergő Pálinkás (born 1996), Hungarian footballer
- Gergő Rácz (born 1995), Hungarian footballer
- Gergő Rása (born 1989), Hungarian footballer
- Gergő Szécsi (born 1989), Hungarian footballer
- Gergő Szekér (born 1995), Slovak-Hungarian singer, actor, and composer
- Gergő Szemes (born 2003), Hungarian fencer
- Gergő Vaszicsku (born 1991), Hungarian footballer
- Gergõ Wöller (born 1983), Hungarian freestyle wrestler
- Gergő Zalánki (born 1995), Hungarian water polo player
- Gergő Safranny (born 2010), Hungarian guitarist
