= 2024 in Hungary =

- Decades: 2000s; 2010s; 2020s; 2030s
- See also: Other events of 2024; List of years in Hungary

Events in the year 2024 in Hungary.

== Incumbents ==
Incumbents
| Position | Person | Party | Notes |
|---|---|---|---|
| President | Katalin Novák | Fidesz | until 26 Feb |
| President | László Kövér (acting) | Fidesz | 26 Feb – 5 Mar |
| President | Tamás Sulyok | Independent | from 5 Mar |
| Prime Minister | Viktor Orbán | Fidesz | |
| Speaker of the National Assembly | László Kövér | Fidesz | |

== Elections ==
2024 European Parliament election in Hungary 9 June 2024
| Party | Lead candidate |
Popular vote
| Fidesz–KDNP Tamás Deutsch | | 44.82% |
| TISZA Péter Magyar | | 29.60% |
| DK–MSZP–P Klára Dobrev | | 8.03% |
| MHM László Toroczkai | | 6.71% |
| Others | | 10.84% |
Seats
| Fidesz–KDNP | | 11 |
| TISZA | | 7 |
| DK–MSZP–P | | 2 |
| MHM | | 1 |

2024 Hungarian presidential election
| Ballot → | 26 February 2024 |
| Required majority → | 133 out of 199 |
| Tamás Sulyok (Ind.) Nominations: Fidesz–KDNP | 134 / 199 |
| Against | 6 / 199 |
| Invalid | 7 / 199 |
| Absent | 52 / 199 |

== Events ==
=== January ===
- January 1 – Restrictions are lifted on the construction of new wind power plants
- January 15 – Construction of the Southern Ring Rail begins in Budapest.
- January 23 – TEK raids the organization Scythian Hungary plotting to overthrow the Hungarian government
- January 27 – László Toroczkai says at a conference that his Our Homeland Movement would lay claim to a Hungarian-populated region in western Ukraine if the war led to Ukraine losing its statehood.

=== February ===
- February 1 – The Sovereignty Protection Office begins operations.
- February 2 – 444.hu publicizes President Katalin Novák's pardon, dated April 2023, of Endre Kónya, a former deputy director of an orphanage in Bicske who had been imprisoned due to his involvement in a pedophilia case implicating the orphanage's director.
- February 5 – The ruling party Fidesz boycotts an extraordinary National Assembly session called by opposition groupings to speed up the approval of Sweden's NATO membership bid.
- February 10 – President Novák resigns due to the scandal involving her pardon of Endre Kónya. Judit Varga, who was serving as Minister of Justice in 2023 and had countersigned the pardon, also resigns as a Member of Parliament and withdraws her candidacy for member of the European Parliament in the 2024 election.
- February 11 – Péter Magyar, Judit Varga's ex-husband, gives a live interview on the left-wing YouTube channel Partizán.
- February 16 –
  - Kormányinfó government press conference held by Gergely Gulyás.
  - Zoltán Balog resigns from the synodal presidency of the Hungarian Reformed Church.
  - Tens of thousands protest in Heroes Square, Budapest against child abuse, organised by Hungarian social media influencers.
- February 17 – Viktor Orbán delivers the annual State of the Nation address.
- February 22 – Tamás Sulyok is nominated Fidesz presidential candidate, Tamás Deutsch is nominated head of the Fidesz EP list
- February 25 – Political parties protest for direct presidential elections in Kossuth Square, Budapest.
- February 26 – Parliament's spring session opens.
  - Parliament ratifies Sweden's bid to join NATO.
  - Parliament approves Katalin Novák's resignation. Speaker of the house László Kövér becomes acting president.
  - 2024 Hungarian presidential election: Tamás Sulyok is elected president.

=== March ===
- March 5 – Tamás Sulyok assumes office as president. His first act is to sign a bill formally authorizing the Foreign Ministry to ratify Sweden's accession to NATO.
- March 10 – Gergely Kovács and Zsuzsanna Döme, co-chairs of the Hungarian Two-Tailed Dog Party (MKKP), resign after the party rejects Kovács' participation in a primary election in Budapest District XII. They reverse their decision next day.
- March 14 – Alexandra Szentkirályi becomes the Fidesz mayoral candidate in Budapest.
- March 15 –
  - Péter Magyar holds a rally at Andrássy út attended by around 10,000 people, during which he announces the launch of Talpra Magyarok Mozgalom.
  - Viktor Orbán holds a rally in Budapest, railing against the "western world" and Brussels.
- March 19 – Dávid Vitézy declares his candidacy for Mayor of Budapest.
- March 21–24 – Zoltán Perlai (DK) wins primary elections in Budapest District XXII.
- March 24 – Five people are killed and six others are injured after a rally car crashes into spectators during a race between Lábatlan and Bajót, Komárom-Esztergom County.
- March 26 – Péter Magyar releases a recording of him and his ex-wife Judit Varga, as proof for government crimes around the Völner-Schadl scandal. He holds a rally in Budapest that evening.
- March 28 – The DK, MSZP and the PM agree on strategic cooperation, a common list for the upcoming European Parliament, local, and the 2026 parliamentary elections.

=== April ===
- April 6 – Péter Magyar holds a huge rally in Kossuth Square, Budapest.
- April 10 – Péter Magyar declares he will run under the previously marginal TISZA party.
- April 14 – The primary election in Budapest District XII using Instant-runoff voting is won by MKKP candidate Gergely Kovács.
- April 18 – The primary election in Budapest District V is won by Péter Juhász.

=== May ===
- May 5 – Péter Magyar holds a rally in Debrecen.
- May 8–10 – Chinese President Xi Jinping visits Hungary.
- May 16 – 444.hu releases documents claiming the Hungarian Foreign Ministry knew about Russian cyberattacks against their systems they previously denied.
- May 17 – A debate is held between EP list leaders organised by Partizán. Tamás Deutsch (Fidesz) and Péter Magyar (TISZA) do not participate.
- May 18 – Two people are killed and five others are reported missing following a collision between two boats along the Danube River near Verőce, Pest County.
- May 22 – Klára Dobrev accuses President Tamás Sulyok of assisting the selling of Hungarian land to foreign owners.
- May 30 – The televised debate between EP election list leaders is held at Várkert Bazár, Budapest. Péter Magyar holds a demonstration in front of the venue.
- May 31 – The Budapest mayoral candidate debate is held between Gergely Karácsony and Dávid Vitézy, organized by Partizán.

=== June ===
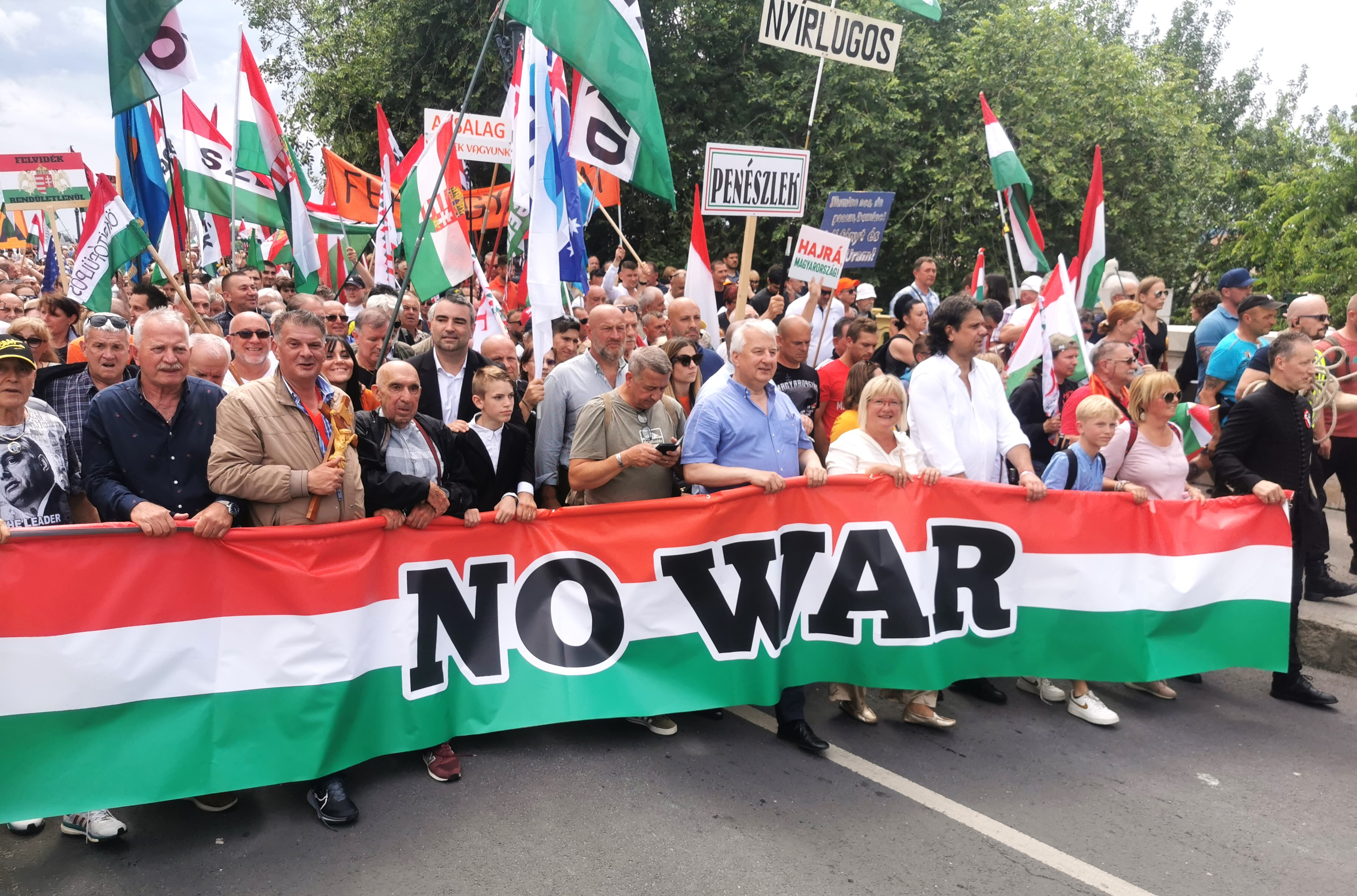
Anti-war demonstration in Budapest

- 1 June – Tens of thousands march in Budapest in a peace march. People wave flags and signs reading "No War".
- 6 June – The Hungarian government buys back ownership of Budapest Ferenc Liszt International Airport. The Hungarian government will own 80% while Vinci Airports will take 20%. The Airport was sold off in 2005
- 7 June – Fidesz candidate Alexandra Szentkirályi withdraws from the Budapest mayoral campaign and endorses Dávid Vitézy.
- 9 June
  - 2024 European Parliament election in Hungary, 2024 Hungarian local elections. Fidesz retains its plurality in the Hungarian contingent of the European Parliament.
  - Bence Tordai announces his departure from Dialogue right after voting is closed. He continues his work as an independent representative in the National Assembly.
- 10 June
  - Anna Donáth and the entire leadership of Momentum resigns.
  - Klára Dobrev declares the dissolution of her shadow government
- 13 June – Hungary is fined 200 million euros, in addition to a daily one-million-euro fine by the European Court of Justice for "deliberately evading" compliance with European Union laws on migration and asylum seekers.
- 14 June:
  - After a recount, Gergely Karácsony retains his victory in the Budapest mayoral election with 41 votes. Nonetheless, Karácsony turns to the Curia to repeat the election.
  - Italian anti-fascist activist Ilaria Salis is released from detention in Hungary on attempted murder charges since 2023 after gaining legal immunity as an MEP-elect in the European Parliament election on 9 June.
- 18 June –
  - The Christian Democratic People's Party (KDNP) leaves the European People's Party. The party is an ally of Fidesz which also left the EPP in 2021.
  - Newly elected TISZA representatives are admitted to the EPP Group (though the party itself does not join the EPP).
- 19 June – The European Commission reprimands Belgium, France, Hungary, Italy, Malta, Poland, and Slovakia for breaking budget rules.
- 26 June – The Curia affirms the result of the Budapest mayoral election.
- 30 June – Fidesz–KDNP forms a political alliance with the Czech ANO and Austrian FPÖ called Patriots for Europe.

=== July ===
- 1 July – Hungary takes over the Presidency of the Council of the European Union
- 2 July – Viktor Orbán visits Kyiv for the first time since the start of the Russian invasion of Ukraine, proposing a ceasefire plan which is rejected by President Volodymyr Zelenskyy.
- 5 July:
  - Viktor Orbán meets with Russian President Vladimir Putin in Moscow.
  - The Constitutional Court annuls the Curia's decision on the Budapest Mayoral Election.
- 7 July:
  - Márton Tompos is elected as the new leader of Momentum, narrowly defeating András Fekete-Győr
  - The Curia orders the recount of valid votes for the Budapest Mayoral Election.
- 8 July – Viktor Orbán makes an unannounced "peace mission" to Beijing to meet with China's leader Xi Jinping following the similarly unannounced meeting with Vladimir Putin in Russia.
- 11 July – Péter Magyar visits Kyiv.
- 12 July – The final results of the 2024 Budapest Mayoral Election are published after the recount of valid votes. Gergely Karácsony retains victory with 293 votes. Dávid Vitézy concedes.
- 15 July – The European Commission announces that top European Union officials including European Commission president Ursula von der Leyen will boycott informal meetings hosted by Hungary during its rotating EU Presidency, in response to rogue visits made by Viktor Orbán to Russia and China regarding the Russian invasion of Ukraine.
- 23 July – The European Union deprives Hungary of its ability to host the next set of foreign and defense ministry meetings as a "symbolic signal" against Viktor Orbán's uncoordinated meetings in Russia and China, moving the ministry meetings from Budapest to Brussels, Belgium.

=== August ===
- 21 August – A law reducing government support for Ukrainian refugees comes into effect, effectively limiting the number of those eligible for aid to refugees who originated from 13 regions of Ukraine deemed to have been directly affected by the Russian invasion.
- 22 August – The government announces that it would provide one way tickets to Brussels for migrants in response to the European Court of Justice imposing fines over Hungary's restrictive asylum policy.
- 23 August – In an interview to Telex, LMP co-leader Péter Ungár claims he and his party are no longer part of the "institutional opposition"
- 25 August – A Claudiopolis InterCity train derails while arriving at Budapest Keleti station.
- 27 August – The Hungarian Evangelical Fellowship loses its license to operate its schools.
- 28 August – Csaba Mészáros, the principal of Imre Madách Gymnasium in Budapest, is fired from his position for not complying with new regulations banning students' use of mobile phones.

=== September ===
- 2 September – Students protest in front of the Ministry of Interior.
- 6 September – Gergő Bese, a pro-Fidesz parish priest from Dunavecse, is suspended from the Roman Catholic Church after reports emerge of him attending gay parties.
- 16 September – Flooding begins on the Danube
- 20 September – A protest is held in support of the Hungarian Evangelical Fellowship at Blaha Lujza tér, Budapest
- 24 September – At the last session of the outgoing City Assembly of Győr, the Fidesz-KDNP majority strips powers from the mayorship that was lost to the opposition in June.
- 25 September – Balázs Orbán states on a Mandiner podcast that Hungary, contrary to Ukraine, would not have defended the country against a Russian invasion, citing the lesson of 1956. The statement generates heavy backlash, and makes international news.
- 30 September – Outgoing Mayor of Zugló Csaba Horváth, and Deputy Mayor Anett Bősz retire from politics.

=== October ===
- 1 October – Municipal governments elected in June take office nationwide.
- 3 October – The European Commission files a case in the European Court of Justice against Hungary over the latter's "sovereignty protection law" over concerns on civil rights.
- 4 October – Opening session of the General Assembly of Budapest. No deputy mayor is nominated.
- 5 October – Péter Magyar holds a protest in front of the MTVA building.
- 9 October – Viktor Orbán and Péter Magyar speak in the European Parliament.
- 17 October –
  - Momentum politicians András Fekete-Győr and Koppány Bendegúz Szarvas are sentenced to prison for their use of a smoke grenade against police during the 2018 protests. Fekete-Győr hands over his parliamentary mandate to Katalin Cseh.
  - Antal Csárdi leaves LMP
- 18 October – MOL reports an oil spill near Gárdony. Since early September, ~500 m³ oil leaked into the soil.
- 19 October – DK announces that it would run a candidate in all 106 constituencies for the 2026 election.
- 20 October – In an interview with 444.hu, Antal Csárdi claims Péter Ungár and Dávid Vitézy coordinated their mayoral campaign with Antal Rogán.
- 23 October –
  - A poll from 21 Kutatóközpont measures TISZA above Fidesz for the first time.
  - Viktor Orbán speaks in Milenáris Park, and draws parallels between the USSR and the EU, alluding to Magyar as a western puppet and warn against future Ukrainian NATO troops as "eastern, Slavic troops" stationed in Hungary. Counter-protestor Róbert Puzsér is refused entry.
  - Péter Magyar holds a rally, marching from Bem József tér to Széna tér. He declares the recruitment of 106 candidates for the 2026 election.
- 28 October – Viktor Orbán visits Tbilisi after the Georgian election

=== November ===
- 4 November – Bálint Somkuti, a researcher at the Sovereignty Protection Office, is fired for his Facebook post "He who does not respect (changed to: recognize) overwhelming force, is not (added: primarily) a hero, but a fool!", referring to the anniversary of the 1956 Soviet invasion of Hungary.
- 5 November – József Szájer returns to public life, founding the Free Europe Institute alongside Mária Schmidt
- 7 November –
  - 5th European Political Community Summit held in Budapest, among the attendees is Ukrainian president Volodymyr Zelenskyy.
  - Péter Magyar meets with Austrian chancellor Karl Nehammer and French president Emmanuel Macron.
- 10 November – Péter Magyar discloses claims of surveillance and blackmail against his party, dubbing it the "Hungarian Watergate".
- 11 November
  - The 2025 Budget is presented.
  - A recording of Péter Magyar is leaked by his ex-girlfriend Evelin Vogel.
- 17 November – Dávid Vitézy announces the Podmaniczky Movement for public participation (the name previously existed for his faction in the Budapest Assembly).
- 18 November – Fidesz publishes its redistricting proposal for parliamentary constituencies
- 22 November – Upon the International Criminal Court's arrest warrant against Israeli Prime Minister Benjamin Netanyahu, Viktor Orbán declares he will not comply, and invites him to Hungary.
- 28 November – 15 December – 2024 European Women's Handball Championship

=== December ===
- 3 December – Communications director Tamás Menczer figures in a scuffle with Péter Magyar at the entrance of Szikla utcai Children's Home in Pécs.
- 9 December – János Lázár gives an interview to ATV, comments on the emergence of Péter Magyar
- 20 December – Hungary grants political asylum to Polish former deputy justice minister Marcin Romanowski, who is wanted in his home country on corruption charges.

== Deaths ==
=== March ===
- 24 March – Péter Eötvös, 80, composer, conductor and teacher.

=== April ===
- 4 April – Zsuzsa Ferge, 92, sociologist and statistician.
- 5 April – Péter Schumann, 69, footballer.

=== September ===
- 2 September – Mihály Kupa
- 28 September – Dániel Karsai

=== October ===
- 4 October – Vilmosné Gryllus, 100, Hungarian chemist.
- 9 October – Lily Ebert, 100, Hungarian-born British Holocaust survivor and writer.
- 17 October – Árpád Potápi parliamentary representative for Tolna County 2nd constituency

== Holidays ==
- 1 January – New Year's Day
- 15 March – Revolution Day
- 29 March – Good Friday
- 1 April – Easter Monday
- 1 May – International Workers' Day
- 20 May – Whit Monday
- 20 August – State Foundation Day
- 23 October – 1956 Revolution Memorial Day
- 1 November – All Saints' Day
- 25 December – Christmas Day
- 26 December – Boxing Day

== Art and entertainment ==
- List of Hungarian submissions for the Academy Award for Best International Feature Film

== See also ==
- 2024 in the European Union
- 2024 in Europe
