= 2023 in Hungary =

- Decades: 2000s; 2010s; 2020s; 2030s
- See also: Other events of 2023; List of years in Hungary

Events in the year 2023 in Hungary.

== Incumbents ==
Incumbents
| Position | Person | Party |
|---|---|---|
| President | Katalin Novák | Fidesz |
| Prime Minister | Viktor Orbán | Fidesz |
| Speaker of the National Assembly | László Kövér | Fidesz |

== Events ==
=== January ===
- 3 January - The Hungarian state-owned 4iG company buys Digi's Hungarian division.
- 9 January - 4iG buys 49% ownership of Vodafone Hungary.
- 12 January - The European Commission blocks Fidesz-linked universities from signing new Erasmus+ and Horizon Europe grants.
- 23 January - Renovated Ferenciek tere and Deák Ferenc Tér stations are open on Metro Line 3

=== February ===
- 12 February - Researchers at the Konkoly Observatory in Hungary discover 2023 CX1, a 1-metre (3.3-foot) asteroid predicted to fall harmlessly as a fireball over the English Channel at 03:00 UTC, making it the seventh asteroid to be discovered before impacting Earth.

=== March ===
- 2 March - Ministry of Interior publishes a proposed bill for defining the working conditions, advancement and status of Hungarian teachers. Commonly known as the "status law", it sparks a new wave of protests from teachers and students.
- 20 March - Renovated Arany János utca, Nyugati Pályaudvar and Dózsa György út stations open on Metro Line 3. Service resumes on full length, only Lehel tér and Nagyvárad tér stations are skipped.
- 30 March - Anna Donáth announces the foundation of Hungary of Tomorrow Association (Holnap Magyarországa Egyesület).

=== April ===
- 4 April – Attila Mesterházy leaves MSZP and founds his own left-wing party with László Szakács, called Socialists and Democrats (Szocialisták és Demokraták).
- 12 April – US imposes sanctions on 3 leading officials of the International Investment Bank (IIB), including its Hungarian vice president Imre Laszlóczki.
- 13 April – Government of Hungary announces its withdrawal from the International Investment Bank.
- 24 April – Thousands protest against new education law. A part of the crowd marches to the Carmelite Monastery. Police uses tear gas once.
- 28 April – György Budaházy is given a Pardon by Hungarian president Katalin Novák.
- 28–30 April – Pope Francis visits Hungary.

=== May ===
- 1 May – MBH Bank begins operations, following the merger of MKB Bank Plc., Takarékbank Plc. and Budapest Bank Plc.
- 3 May –
  - Student protesters march to the Carmelite Monastery and break the fencing around the building. Police pushes back the crowd with tear gas. 5 people are charged with violence against officials and 8 for covering their faces with masks. Momentum PM Márton Tompos is dragged behind police lines.
  - Parliament votes to extend the state of emergency due to the Russian-Ukrainian war and rule by decree until November 25.
  - Parliament passes justice reform mandated by the European Commission.
- 4–5 May – CPAC Hungary is held in the Bálna building in Budapest.
- 13 May – The Washington Post reports that classified U.S. intelligence documents released in the 2022–2023 Pentagon document leaks included a note of a conversation between the President of Ukraine and Deputy Prime Minister Yulia Svyrydenko in which Volodymyr Zelenskyy suggested blowing up the Druzhba pipeline to hit Hungarian industry, as Orbán's government was too friendly towards the Kremlin during the Russo-Ukrainian War.
- 19 May – Student protest against the status law. They march from Kossuth tér to Oktogon. After the speeches, they marched towards the FIDESZ headquarters, but they were blocked by police.
- 22 May – Renovated Lehel tér and Nagyvárad tér metro stations are opened, concluding the 2017-2023 renovation of Metro Line 3.

=== July ===
- 1 July – Car crash on Árpád Bridge kills an adjacent bicyclist.

=== August ===
- 1 August – MÁV closes 10 railway lines (lines 89, 114, 121, 125, 38, 47, 78, 98, 103, and 146).
- 20 August – Péter Jakab's On the People's Side Movement officially becomes a party.

=== September ===
- 7 September – Gábor Vona's Second Reform Era Foundation becomes a political party.
- 15 September – Hungary imposes a national import ban on 24 Ukrainian agricultural products, including grains, vegetables, several meat products and honey.
- 16 Sep 2023 – Péter Márki-Zay's Everybody's Hungary People's Party officially becomes a party.

=== October ===
- 17 October – Hungarian Prime Minister Viktor Orbán and Russian President Vladimir Putin hold talks at the Belt and Road Initiative forum in Beijing, China. It is the first meeting between Putin and an EU leader since Russia's invasion of Ukraine.

=== November ===
- 6 November – László L. Simon is fired as Director-General of the Hungarian National Museum for his refusal to ban minors from viewing the World Press Photo exhibition
- 18 November – 30th Fidesz Party Congress, Viktor Orbán is re-elected as party president as the sole candidate, alongside his vice presidents.
- 22 November – Parliament establishes the Sovereignty Protection Office, to be set up by February 2024
- 23 November – Electoral agreement between DK and Párbeszéd, DK agrees to support Gergely Karácsony as Budapest mayoral candidate
- 30 November – Momentum declares their support for Karácsony's candidacy

=== December ===
- 12 December – Parliament restores party-list proportional elections for the General Assembly of Budapest. The motion was proposed by Our Homeland Movement.
- 14 December: the European Council agree to open accession negotiations with Ukraine, as well as Moldova. Hungary long opposed talks starting accession negotiations, did not veto the move. Prime Minister Viktor Orban left the room momentarily in what officials described as a pre-agreed and constructive manner, while the other 26 leaders went ahead with the vote.

== Deaths ==
=== January ===
- 4 January — Géza Morcsányi, 70, playwright and actor (On Body and Soul).
- 9 January — Ferenc Mészáros, 72, footballer (Vasas SC, Vitória de Setúbal, national team).
- 14 January — Gáspár Miklós Tamás, 74, politician, member of the national assembly (1989–1994).
- 16 January — Ferenc Varga, 97, sprint canoer, Olympic bronze medalist (1952).
- 19 January— Imre Mécs, 89, chairman of the committee of national defense (1994–1998)
- 30 January — László Kordás, 53, politician, member of the National Assembly (2022–2023)
- 31 January — Egon Schmidt, 91, orthodontist and natural historian

== See also ==
- List of Hungarian films of the 2020s
