= Keleti =

Keleti is the Hungarian word for east. It is used as a surname and then may refer to:

- Ágnes Keleti (1921–2025), Hungarian-Israeli artistic gymnast
- Éva Keleti (1931–2026), Hungarian photographer
- Gusztáv Kelety (1834–1902), Hungarian painter and art critic
- György Keleti (1946–2020), Hungarian politician
- Márton Keleti (1905–1973), Hungarian film director

== See also ==
- Budapest Keleti railway station, the east station, the largest among the three main railway stations in Budapest
- Keleti pályaudvar (Budapest Metro), station of the M2 (East-West) line of the Budapest Metro
