= 2025 in Hungary =

- Decades: 2000s; 2010s; 2020s; 2030s
- See also: Other events of 2025; List of years in Hungary

Events in the year 2025 in Hungary.

== Incumbents ==
Incumbents
Position	Person	Party
President	Tamás Sulyok	Independent
Prime Minister	Viktor Orbán	Fidesz
Speaker of the National Assembly	László Kövér	Fidesz

== Events ==
=== January ===
- January 1 –
  - After midnight, Péter Magyar holds a New Year's speech in which he calls for early elections. There is no presidential speech from Tamás Sulyok.
  - Land crossings on the Hungary–Romania border open, as Romania joins the Schengen Area.
- January 7 –
  - The United States imposes sanctions on cabinet minister Antal Rogán for alleged corruption.
  - News emerges that Orbán visited an Ayurvedic healer in Kerala, India.
- January 12 – By-election in Tolna 2nd Constituency. Fidesz holds the constituency with their candidate Krisztina Csibi.
- January 20 – Emirati real estate developer Abu Dhabi Eagle Hills purchases a 100 hectare area around the former Rákosrendező marshalling yard in Budapest. Their planned development, titled Grand Budapest, is controversial and opposed by the city; though there are no concrete plans to speak of, some areas are zoned for skyscrapers up to 500 meters.
- January 23 – More than 240 schools nationwide receive bomb threats of identical content and believed to have been sent by a sole sender.

=== February ===
- February 6 – The Hungarian government acknowledges Budapest's priority to buy the Rákosrendező property
- February 12 – Viktor Orbán meets Alice Weidel, leader of the German AfD
- February 14 – Bertalan Havasi, Deputy Secretary for the Prime Minister's Press Office, leaves his position.
- February 15 – First Congress of Tisza Party. Romulusz Ruszin-Szendi is introduced as a prominent speaker.
- February 17 – Antal Csárdi leaves LMP's parliamentary fraction. As the number of LMP representatives falls below 5, it is no longer qualified to from a fraction. After they fail to recruit another representative, the LMP fraction ceases to exist, and the remaining 4 representatives become independent.
- February 22 –
  - Protest in front of the Ministry of Justice in Budapest.
  - Viktor Orbán delivers the annual State of the Nation address. He introduces expansion of some welfare measures, announces constitutional amendments to protect the "right to use cash", and to mandate the existence of only two genders. He also threatens to ban pride parades in Hungary.

=== March ===
- March 7 – Orbán announces a consultation on Ukraine's EU accession, titled Voks 2025
- March 12 – The governing Fidesz party submits its proposed amendments to the constitution to the parliament.
- March 15 – National Holiday
  - Orbán speaks at the National Museum, promising an "Easter cleanup" against foreign-funded judges, journalists and NGOs, calling them "bugs".
  - Péter Magyar holds a rally at Andrássy út. He announces a consultation titled Nemzet Hangja (Voice of the Nation)
- March 18 – The National Assembly passes a ban on pride parades. Opposition representatives protest with smoke candles, shouting and playing the Soviet National Anthem. A protest blocks Margaret Bridge at Jászai Mari Tér.
- March 22 – Péter Magyar accuses Orbán of holding zebras at his Hatvanpuszta estates
- March 23 – By-election in Budapest 11th constituency. DK candidate László Varju is re-elected
- March 25 – Hadházy's second protest against the Pride ban.
- March 27 – János Lázár speaks out against the luxurious lifestyle among the NER oligarchy at a street forum in Kisvárda, calling to "sweep away those who, like ticks, abused the opportunities we created".

=== April ===
- April 1 – Hadházy's third protest against the Pride ban.
- April 3 –
  - Israeli Prime Minister Benjamin Netanyahu lands in Budapest for a state visit to Hungary, a signatory of the International Criminal Court, in defiance of the International Criminal Court’s arrest warrant against him for alleged war crimes.
  - The Hungarian Government announces it will withdraw from the International Criminal Court.
  - Thousands rally for Péter Magyar in Debrecen
- April 7 – Speech from Tisza MEP Kinga Kollár in the European Parliament, in which she calls EU sanctions "very effective" triggers attacks against her in pro-Fidesz media, where it is compared to Gyurcsány's Őszöd Speech.
- April 12 –
  - The Hungarian Two-Tailed Dog Party holds "Illiberal Pride" rally parodying pro-Fidesz peace marches and the recent Pride ban.
  - Zsolt Bayer protests against Kinga Kollár and the Tisza Party at Millenáris Park
- April 13 –
  - Péter Takács Secretary of Healthcare begins to tour hospitals whose renovation is delayed due to EU sanctions
  - Tisza announces the results of their Voice of the Nation consultation. 58.18% of responders vote in support of Ukraine's EU membership.
- April 14 – Parliament passes the constitutional amendment outlawing public events by the LGBTQ+ community. The constitutional amendments, will also protect the "right to use cash", mandate the existence of only two genders (male or female), and Hungarian citizenship of dual citizens may be suspended for definite periods of time. Momentum protests by blocking Chain Bridge
- April 17 – Viktor Orbán gives an interview to András Hont
- April 23 – Public procurement is announced for tram extension to Nádorkert in Budapest

=== May ===
- May 5 –
  - Anna Orosz resigns her seat in Parliament.
  - Ex-DK politician Gábor Leel-Őssy registers the DUNA (Danube) Party
- May 6 – Hadházy protests at Ferenciek tere, then marches to the MTA building. Two people are prosecuted.
- May 7–8 – Hungarian cardinal of the Catholic Church Péter Erdő is an Elector in the 2025 papal conclave. Erdő was seen as a leading candidate in the 2025 papal conclave but is not elected.
- May 8 –
  - Ferenc Gyurcsány withdraws from politics, resigns from Parliament and as the leader of DK. His wife Klára Dobrev also announces their divorce
  - Péter Magyar releases a 2023 recording of Kristóf Szalay-Bobrovniczky saying "Let's break with the peace mentality and move to phase zero on the road to war"
  - Csaba Hende and Péter Polt are nominated to the Constitutional Court
- May 9 –
  - The Security Service of Ukraine claims to have uncovered Hungarian spies tasked with infiltrating Zakarpattia Oblast.
  - In retaliation Hungary expels two Ukrainian diplomats it accuses of spying. Ukraine likewise expels two Hungarian diplomats.
  - Orbán expresses support for Romanian presidential candidate George Simion at a speech in Tihany. After protest from RMDSZ, he backtracks to a non-committal stance.
- May 12 –
  - Presidency of Momentum declares against running for the 2026 election.
  - Karácsony dismisses BKV CEO Tibor Bolla over his connections to organised crime
- May 13 –
  - Orbán claims "a Hungarian opposition party" is an active participant in foreign intelligence actions against Hungary. In response Péter Magyar threatens with legal action.
  - Hadházy protests at Ferenciek tere, marches to the Ministry of Defense building.
  - In the late evening (23:38), Fidesz MP János Halász introduces a bill that would restrict and penalize organisations receiving foreign funding based on a list compiled by the Sovereignty Protection Office.
- May 14 –
  - Péter Magyar begins his "one million steps" walk from Budapest to Oradea (Nagyvárad)
  - Péter Polt resigns. Next day Gábor Bálint Nagy is nominated as Chief Prosecutor
- May 17 – "Mini-Pride" is held at Andrássy út, Budapest. Budapest Police did not block the demonstration.
- May 18 –
  - Fidesz inaugurates their online activist group named Fight Club
  - Tens of thousands protest at Kossuth Square against the bill on foreign funding
- May 20 – the National Assembly approves a bill to initiate the country's withdrawal from the International Criminal Court (ICC), marking Hungary as the first European Union member state to take such action. The bill, introduced by Deputy Prime Minister Zsolt Semjén, passes with 134 votes in favor, 37 against, and 7 abstentions.
- May 22 – Gergely Gaal resigns from the leadership of KDNP after disagreements with Zsolt Semjén
- May 24 – Péter Magyar arrives to Oradea at the end of his 11 day walk
- May 26 – Gergely Karácsony holds an emergency press conference over Budapest's dire financial situation.
- May 29 –
  - The government garnishes 10.2 Billion Forints from the city of Budapest.
  - CEO of BKK, Katalin Walter resigns.
  - The director of the Budapest Correctional Institution on Szőlő Street is arrested on charges of human trafficking and abuse of public office.
- May 29–30 – CPAC Hungary is held

=== June ===
- June 1 –
  - "Mini-Pride" for LGBTQ rights is planned for Andrássy út, Budapest. The police initially banned the demonstration, but after the Curia rules in favor of it on May 31, they allowed it. Ultimately it was not held, but delayed to June 28, which police considered a new event, and again banned it.
  - Everybody's Hungary People's Party (MMN) announces it will not run in the upcoming parliamentary election.
- June 2 –
  - Lőrinc Mészáros publishes an open letter to Péter Magyar
  - Trade unions of Budapest municipal companies establish strike committee
  - Klára Dobrev is elected as president of DK
- June 4 –
  - Voting on the "Transparency Bill" is delayed to the Autumn session of parliament
  - The Constitutional Court rules that same-sex marriages abroad should be recognized as civil partnerships in Hungary
- June 5 –
  - In an interview, Tibor Navracsics criticizes the luxurious lifestyle of János Lázár and Tiborcz, and the radicalism of Fidesz.
  - Parliament's National Defense and Law Enforcement Committee accuses Romulusz Ruszin-Szendi of pro-Ukrainian sentiments, failing to represent the government position while serving as Chief of Staff.
- June 6 – BKV service halts for 10 minutes (11:50 – 12:00) all over Budapest, as a demonstration.
- June 7 – After the decision is made by the party's general assembly, Momentum (MM) announces it will not run in the upcoming parliamentary election.
- June 10 –
  - Large protest at Kossuth Square, Budapest, organised by Róbert Puzsér's Civic Resistance
  - Negotiations between Budapest and the national government begins over the city's financial crisis
- June 11 –
  - Parliament approves Péter Polt as President of the Constitutional Court and Bálint Gábor Nagy as the new Chief Prosecutor
  - Parliament approves a bill to suspend dual citizenship if a person is considered a threat to national security
- June 14 – Dezső Farkas leaves Tisza and announces his new IRÁNY a Jövő party
- June 16 – Karácsony declares Budapest Pride will be held as municipal event Police however still declares it banned
- June 17 – Metropolitan Court of Budapest places the city under protection, averting the immediate financial crisis
- June 19 – MP András Jámbor declares he will not run in the 2026 elections
- June 21 – The real-time railway tracking site Vonatinfó is closed, after it was revealed MÁV was covering up delays.
- June 25 – Tibor Kapu travels to the ISS as part of Axiom Mission 4, becoming the second Hungarian astronaut in space in history
- June 26 – Hungary holds a public consultation in which, of the 2 million people who participated, 95% voted against Ukraine joining the EU, while only 5% supported the bid.
- June 28 – The Budapest Pride march is held despite the restriction of gatherings promoting homosexuality under the new child protection law.

=== July ===
- July 1 – 752 km of railway is transferred from MÁV to GYSEV
- July 12 – Tisza holds its second congress in Nagykanizsa.
- July 17 – The government bars three Ukrainian military officials from entering the country amid a diplomatic dispute caused by the death of a dual Hungarian-Ukrainian citizen who died in disputed circumstances following his mobilization into the Armed Forces of Ukraine.
- July 24 – The members of the Irish band Kneecap, who were scheduled to perform at the Sziget Festival in Budapest on 11 August are banned from Hungary for three years, with government spokesperson Zoltán Kovács saying that the band members "repeatedly engage in anti-Semitic hate speech supporting terrorism and terrorist groups".
- July 26 – At the annual Tusványos festival, Orbán announces the establishment of Digital Civil Circles (DPK)

=== August ===
- August 1 – Gergely Karácsony is questioned by police at the National Investigation Bureau on his involvement in the Budapest Pride parade earlier that year.
- August 2 – Ákos Hadházy organizes a protest to Hatvanpuszta. Antelopes are spotted in the area.
- August 7 – Hadházy begins publishing leaked documents about the Hatvanpuszta estates.
- August 11 – Zoltán Várkonyi, DK's candidate in Bács-Kiskun 1st Constituency declares his withdrawal, as to not "stand in the way of change". According to DK, he was already let go by the party for his incompetence.
- August 26 – News site Index publishes an internal memo of Tisza on plans for progressive taxation. Fidesz begins to campaign on Tisza raising taxes.
- August 28 –
  - Hungary issues an entry ban against Robert Brovdi, commander of the Ukrainian Unmanned Systems Forces, in response to Ukrainian drone attacks on the Druzhba pipeline.
  - Mandiner leaks a video of Tisza vice-president Zoltán Tarr discussing tax policy at a private forum in Etyek, saying they cannot openly discuss progressive taxation until the election is won.

=== September ===
- September 5 – Budapest and the state reaches agreement on the Rákosrendező development
- September 7 – Both Fidesz and Tisza organizes a meetings in Kötcse. For the first time, Fidesz's annual Kötcse Meeting is opened to the public.
- September 8 –
  - The Czech Security Information Service announces the dismantling of an espionage network operating across several European countries and run by the Belarusian KGB following a joint operation by the Czech Republic, Romania, and Hungary.
  - In an interview to Válasz Online, Gábor Kuslits (former director of Child Protection Services in Budapest) mentions two unnamed high-ranking politicians were involved in the molestation case at Szőlő Street Juvenile Correction Center.
- September 12 – Derailment at Magyarkút, Verőce.
- September 19 –
  - Following a similar decision by US president Donald Trump, Prime Minister Orbán announces that Hungary would classify "Antifa" as a terrorist organization.
  - Zsolt Szabó, police captain of Hódmezővásárhely commits suicide days after allowing a protest in front of János Lázár's Batida estates.
- September 21 –
  - Fidesz candidate Lajos Kozma wins by-election in the 9th municipal constituency of Budapest District VIII.
  - Major demonstration is held at Heroes' Square
- September 22 –
  - Zsolt Semjén speaks in Parliament denying accusations of pedophilia against him regarding the Szőlő Street scandal
  - Google bans political advertising on their platforms in the EU, followed by Meta from October 1
- September 23 – The European Parliament rejects a petition by Prime Minister Orbán to lift the parliamentary immunity of Péter Magyar amid criminal investigations against the latter.
- September 29 – The government orders the blocking of 12 Ukrainian news websites in response to a ban imposed by Ukraine on foreign media outlets accused of spreading Russian propaganda.

=== October ===
- October 4 – Pride march is held in Pécs, despite an official ban.
- October 7 – The European Parliament narrowly rejects to lift the immunity of Italian MEP Ilaria Salis with the majority of a single vote (306 to 305).
- October 9 – Author László Krasznahorkai is awarded the Nobel Prize for Literature.
- October 13 – Mayor Karácsony announces that the future of Sziget Fesztivál is "uncertain", as the international owned Sziget Zrt. wished to terminate their site use agreement. Founder Károly Gerendai is contacted on returning the festival to Hungarian ownership. Gerendai asks for the lowering of site-use fees for the festival to be viable, but the following Budapest assembly meetings fail to reach a resolution.
- October 16 – Trump states he plans to meet Vladimir Putin in Budapest
- October 19 – Fight Club holds a training camp in Zánka. Orbán holds a private speech, that is leaked by Telex the next day, in which he claims Fidesz has troubles in terms of mobilization
- October 20 – A fire breaks out at the Danube Refinery operated by MOL in Százhalombatta.
- October 21 – Plans for the Budapest Summit suspended
- October 23 – Commemorating the 1956 revolution, both Magyar and Orbán organizes major rallies. The former marches from Deák to Heroes' Square, the latter is a CÖF Peace March, from Elvis Presley tér to Kossuth tér. Mi Hazánk also holds a gathering at Corvin köz.
- October 30 – Péter Magyar negotiates with Károly Gerendai, reaching a compromise on the continuation of Sziget Fesztivál. The festival is confirmed to continue under Hungarian leadership and on November 4 the dates of the 2026 event are scheduled.
- October 31 – Ringier sells Blikk and other magazines to Fidesz tied media group Indamedia.

=== November ===
- November 2 – Magyar Nemzet publishes an article on a leak of 200,000 names from Tisza party application Tisza Világ.
- November 5 –
  - Péter Magyar begins his fifth campaign tour of the country.
  - Mayor of Győr, Bence Pintér offers to host a debate between Magyar and Orbán.
- November 7 –
  - An Interactive map of Tisza Világ users is created based on the leaked data.
  - Orbán meets with Donald Trump in the White House.
- November 10 –
  - British-Hungarian writer David Szalay is awarded the Booker Prize for his novel Flesh.
  - Richárd Barabás announces he will run in 2026 under a new political movement (the Hungarian Humanists Party)
- November 11 – Viktor Orbán gives his first interview to ATV in fifteen years.
- November 12 – Katalin Cseh joins the Humanists. In response, she is expelled from Momentum.
- November 17 – The Tisza Party announces 3 candidates in each of the 103 (out of 106) constituencies to primary for running for MP in 2026.
- November 21 – Szabad Európa, Radio Free Europe's Hungarian service, ceases operations due to budget cuts by the Trump administration in the United States.
- November 28 –
  - Tisza announces the results of the internal primary results for their candidates for the 2026 election
  - Orbán meets Putin in Moscow

=== December ===
- December 8 –
  - Kovács-Buna Károly, acting director of the Szőlő Street Juvenile Correction Center resigns.
  - RTL publishes videos of child abuse at the Szőlő Street Institution. Péter Juhász also publishes such videos next day.
- December 9 –
  - Police, TEK and the Bureau of Investigation raids the Szőlő Street Correctional Institution
  - In an interview with Politico, Trump denies he promised a "financial shield" bailout to Hungary, as Orbán previously claimed.
- December 11 – Kovács-Buna Károly is arrested
- December 12 – Optima Investment Ltd., asset manager for the Hungarian National Bank's foundations, announced agreements with Ultima Capital SA's shareholders that nullified pending share purchase obligations, averting the company's imminent insolvency.
- December 13 – Tisza organised protest marches to Buda Castle to protest against child abuse, demanding the resignation of the government

=== Future and scheduled events ===
- 2025 Budapest Summit

== Holidays ==
- 1 January – New Year's Day
- 15 March – Revolution Day
- 18 April – Good Friday
- 21 April – Easter Monday
- 1 May – International Workers' Day
- 9 June – Whit Monday
- 20 August – State Foundation Day
- 23 October – 1956 Revolution Memorial Day
- 1 November – All Saints' Day
- 25 December – Christmas Day
- 26 December – Boxing Day

== Art and entertainment ==
- List of Hungarian submissions for the Academy Award for Best International Feature Film

== Deaths ==
=== January ===
- 2 January – Ágnes Keleti, 103, Hungarian-Israeli artistic gymnast, Olympic champion (1952, 1956), pneumonia.

=== August ===
- 23 August – László Hetey, 83, actor.
- 28 August – Tibor Hajdu, 95, historian.

=== September ===
- 5 September – Miklós Kásler, 75, oncologist.

=== October ===
- 28 October – Ilona Kassai, 97, actress.

== See also ==
- 2025 in the European Union
- 2025 in Europe
