= Book of Memories =

Book of Memories may refer to:

- A Book of Memories, a 1986 novel
- Silent Hill: Book of Memories, a 2012 video game

== See also ==
- Book of remembrance
