= Péter Nádas =

Hungarian writer (1942–2026)

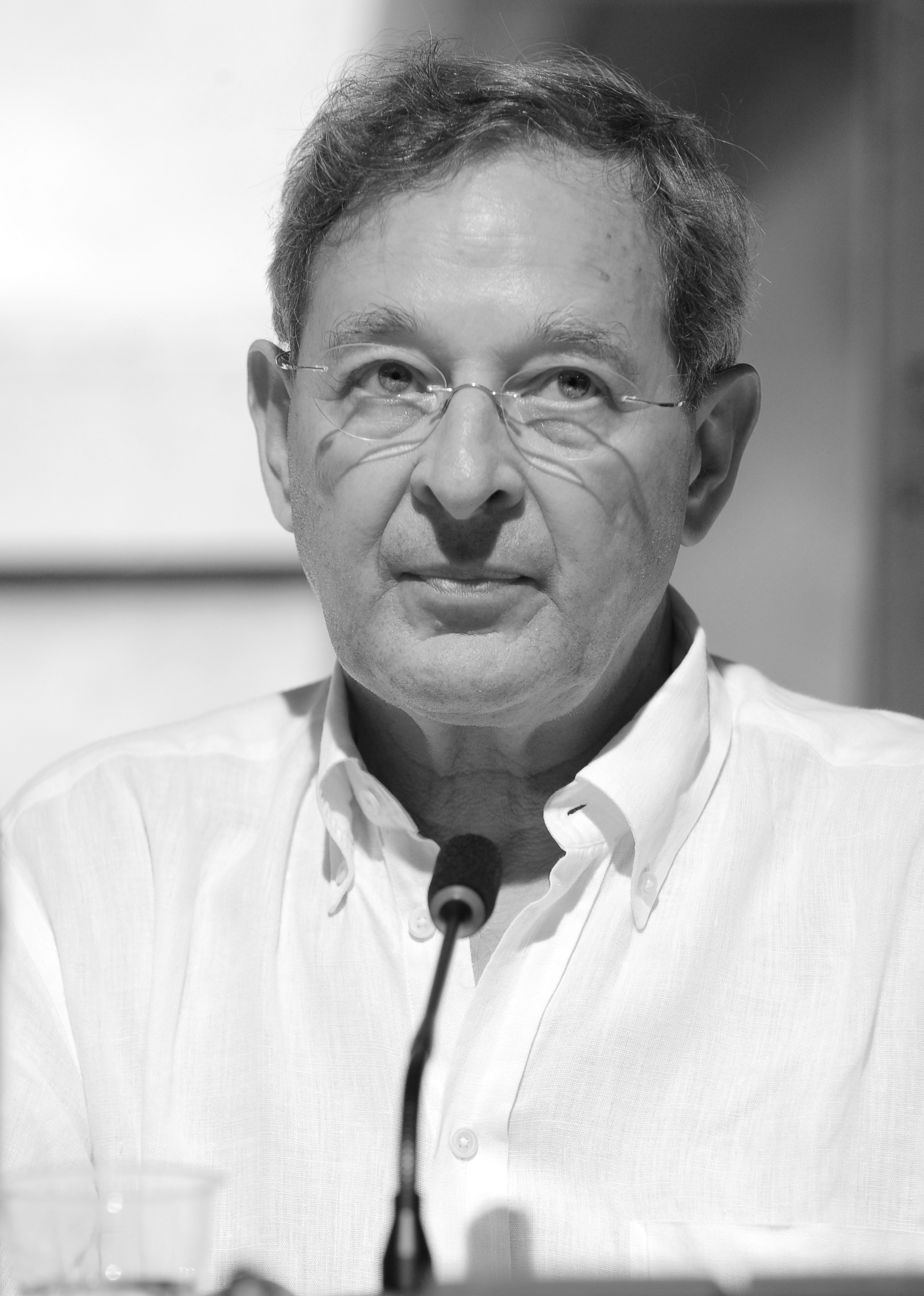
- Nádas in 2012
- Born: 14 October 1942; Budapest, Hungary
- Died: 26 August 2026 (aged 83); Gombosszeg, Hungary
- Occupations: Writer, journalist, photographer, playwright, essayist
- Spouse: Magda Salamon (m. 1990)
- Writing career
- Genres: Novels, short stories, essays
- Notable works: A Book of Memories (1986); Parallel Stories (2005)
- Notable awards: Austrian State Prize for European Literature (1991); Kossuth Prize (1992); Franz Kafka Prize (2003); Würth-Preis für Europäische Literatur (2014)

Péter Nádas (14 October 1942 – 26 August 2026) was a Hungarian writer, playwright and essayist. He was widely acclaimed for surrealist and challenging novels and autobiographical accounts. He was considered among the most significant figures in contemporary Hungarian prose. Susan Sontag described his most A Book of Memories as "the greatest novel written in our time". In 1967, he emerged on the literary scene with an anthology of short stories titled The Bible. Parallel Stories (Párhuzamos történetek), a 1,100-page trilogy published in 2005, has been termed a monumental novel. His two volume memoir titled Shimmering Details (Világló részletek), published in 2017, is also a colossal work that captures a life alongside vital pieces of Europe's history. He was frequently recommended for Nobel Prize in Literature. His last work Halott barátaim (My Dead Friends), was published in early November 2025.

== Life and career ==
Péter Nádas was born in Budapest on 14 October 1942, into a Jewish family, the son of László Nádas (originally Neumeyer) and Klára Tauber. After the takeover by the Hungarian Nazis, the Arrow Cross Party on 15 October 1944, Klára Tauber escaped with her son to Bačka and Novi Sad, but returned to the capital directly before the Siege of Budapest. Péter Nádas survived the siege together with his mother in the flat of his uncle, the journalist Pál Aranyossi.

Even though his parents were illegal Communists during World War II and involved with the Communist administration later on, as well, they had both their sons – Péter and Pál – baptized in the Reformed Church (Calvinist) of Pozsonyi Street. His mother died of an illness when he was 13. In 1958, his father – head of department in one of the ministries, slandered with accusations of embezzlement, then exonerated by the court of all charges – committed suicide; Péter Nádas became an orphan at 16. Magda Aranyossi became the guardian of the two children.

Between 1961 and 1963 Péter Nádas studied journalism and photography. He worked as a journalist at a Budapest magazine (Pest Megyei Hírlap) from 1965 to 1969. He also worked as a playwright and a photographer. Since 1969 he was a freelancer.

In 1990 he married Magda Salamon (with whom he had been living since 1962). In 1984 they moved to a small village in western Hungary, Gombosszeg, where they resided ever afterwards, though he also had a residence in the Castle District of Buda.

In 1993, he was elected member of the Széchenyi Academy of Literature and Arts.

From the early 1970s, he frequently spent time in East Berlin, East Germany, attending lectures at Humboldt University or reading in the Staatsbibliothek. He was a fellow of the Wissenschaftskolleg zu Berlin, Institute for Advanced Study. In 2006, he was elected a member of the Akademie der Künste, Berlin. He enjoyed a high reputation in Germany.

Nádas died in Gombosszeg on 26 August 2026, at the age of 83.

== Works ==
After publishing volumes of short stories, he published his first novel The End of a Family Story in 1977.

Nádas published his second novel, A Book of Memories in 1986. It took Nádas twelve years to write this book. The epigraph of this novel is from the Gospel of John: "But he spoke of the temple of his body" (John 2:21). In this novel, Nádas describes the world as a system of relations linking human bodies to each other. This book earned Nádas comparisons to Marcel Proust.

He published the three-volume Parallel Stories (I: The Mute Realm, II: In the Very Depth of the Night, III: The Breath of Freedom) in 2005. This novel has a multitude of independent stories that melt into one single narrative. It took Nádas eighteen years to complete. The novel has been described as "a virtuoso combination of nineteenth-century high realism with the experimentalism of the nouveau roman", while "the real narrative is that of bodies' actions on one another, their attraction and desires, their mutual memories" (Gábor Csordás). The plot is constructed around the histories of two families: one—the Lippay-Lehrs, who are Hungarian, the other—the Döhrings, who are German. These two main threads link irregularly up to one another via specific events or figures.

Nádas's other novels include Lovely Tale of Photography, Yearbook, On Heavenly and Earthly Love, and A Dialogue with Richard Swartz. Death is a recurrent theme in Nádas's work, particularly in Own Death, based on his experience of clinical death.

His writing has been described as intellectual, detailed, strong, innovative, and demanding. He was the winner of the Würth-Preis für Europäische Literatur in 2014. A volume of interviews with Péter Nádas, by Zsófia Mihancsik (Nincs mennyezet, nincs födém) was published in 2006.

== Bibliography ==
Works translated into English:

- The End of a Family Story (1977, tr. 1998) (ISBN 978-0-14-029179-7)
- Love (1979, tr. 2000) (ISBN 978-0-374-52955-0)
- A Book of Memories (1986, tr. 1997) (ISBN 978-0-374-11543-2) (ISBN 978-0-312-42796-2)(New York) (ISBN 978-0-224-03524-8) (ISBN 978-0-374-11543-2) (ISBN 978-0-14-027567-4) (ISBN 978-0-09-976631-5)(London)
- A Lovely Tale of Photography (1995, tr. 1999) (ISBN 978-80-902171-6-4)
- Own Death (2002, tr. 2004) (ISBN 978-3-86521-010-4)
- Parallel Stories: A Novel (2005, tr. 2011) (ISBN 978-0-374-22976-4)
- Fire and Knowledge: Fiction and Essays (2007) (ISBN 978-0-374-29964-4)
- "A Tale About Fire and Knowledge" in the anthology Caught in a Story
- Shimmering Details, Volume 1: A Memoir (2017, tr. 2023) (ISBN 978-0-374-17459-0)
- Shimmering Details, Volume 2: A Memoir (2017, tr. 2023) (ISBN 978-0-374-61164-4)

== Awards ==
Nádas received several awards, including

- 1989 Prize for Hungarian Art, Hungary.
- 1991 Austrian State Prize for European Literature, Austria.
- 1992 Kossuth Prize, Hungary.
- 1995 Leipzig Book Award for European Understanding, Germany.
- 1998 Vilenica International Prize for Literature, Slovenia.
- 1998 Prix du Meilleur Livre Étranger (Prize for the Best Foreign Book), France.
- 2003 Franz Kafka Prize, Czech Republic.
- 2014 Würth-Preis für Europäische Literatur, Germany.
- 2025 Pour le Mérite for Sciences and Arts

He was also nominated for the Nobel Prize.
