= Csillag Születik =

- Logo
- Genre: Interactive reality television talent show
- Presented by: Nóra Ördög; Lilu (2012); András Stohl (2007–2009)
- Judges: Judit Hernádi (2009–2012); Róbert Puzsér (2012); Lia Pokorny (2012); András Hajós (2012); Tamás Szirtes (2009–2011); Miklós Fáy (2009–2011); Szonja Oroszlán (2009–2011); Sándor Fábry (2007); Tamás Náray (2007); Mariann Falusi (2007); Andrea Keleti (2007)
- Country of origin: Hungary
- No. of series: 4
- No. of episodes: 41 (2 June 2012)

Original release
- Network: RTL Klub
- Release: 3 November 2007 – 2 June 2012

Related
- Hungary's Got Talent

Titles of the show

Csillag születik (Hungarian pronunciation: [ˈt͡ʃilːɒɡ ˈsylɛtik], English: A Star Is Born) is an unlicensed Hungarian version of Got Talent. It ran for four seasons on RTL Klub between 2007 and 2012. Singers, dancers, comedians, variety acts, and other performers compete against each other for audience support. The winner of the show receives 12 million forint (1 million forint is given to the winner every month for a year) ($50,900/€42,600/£35,300).

The first season's judges were Sándor Fábry, Mariann Falusi, Tamás Náray, and Andrea Keleti. The first season was won by Árpád Utasi. The second and third season's judges were Szonja Oroszlán, Miklós Fáy, Judit Hernádi and Tamás Szirtes. The second season was won by István Tabáni, singer. The third season was won by Attila László, singer. Tamás Szirtes left the judging panel, after the third series, because he joined the judging panel of the Hungarian version of Dancing with the Stars.

The fourth season aired in 2012 with three new judges, only Judit Hernádi returned from the earlier seasons. The judging panel included Róbert Puzsér (critic), Judit Hernádi (comedian, actress), András Hajós (singer, comedian) and Lia Pokorny (actress). The winner was János Elek Mészáros, a folk singer.

In 2015, RTL Klub started to air its licensed version of Got Talent, titled Hungary's Got Talent.

Series	Start	Finish	Winner
1	3 November 2007	22 December 2007	Árpi Utasi storyteller
2	10 October 2009	19 December 2009	István Tabáni singer
3	2 April 2011	4 June 2011	Attila László singer
4	17 March 2012	2 June 2012	János Elek Mészáros singer
5	9 November 2025	21 December 2025	
