= Dániel Karsai =

Hungarian lawyer, ALS patient, and euthanasia advocate (1997–2024)

Dániel András Karsai
- Karsai Dániel András
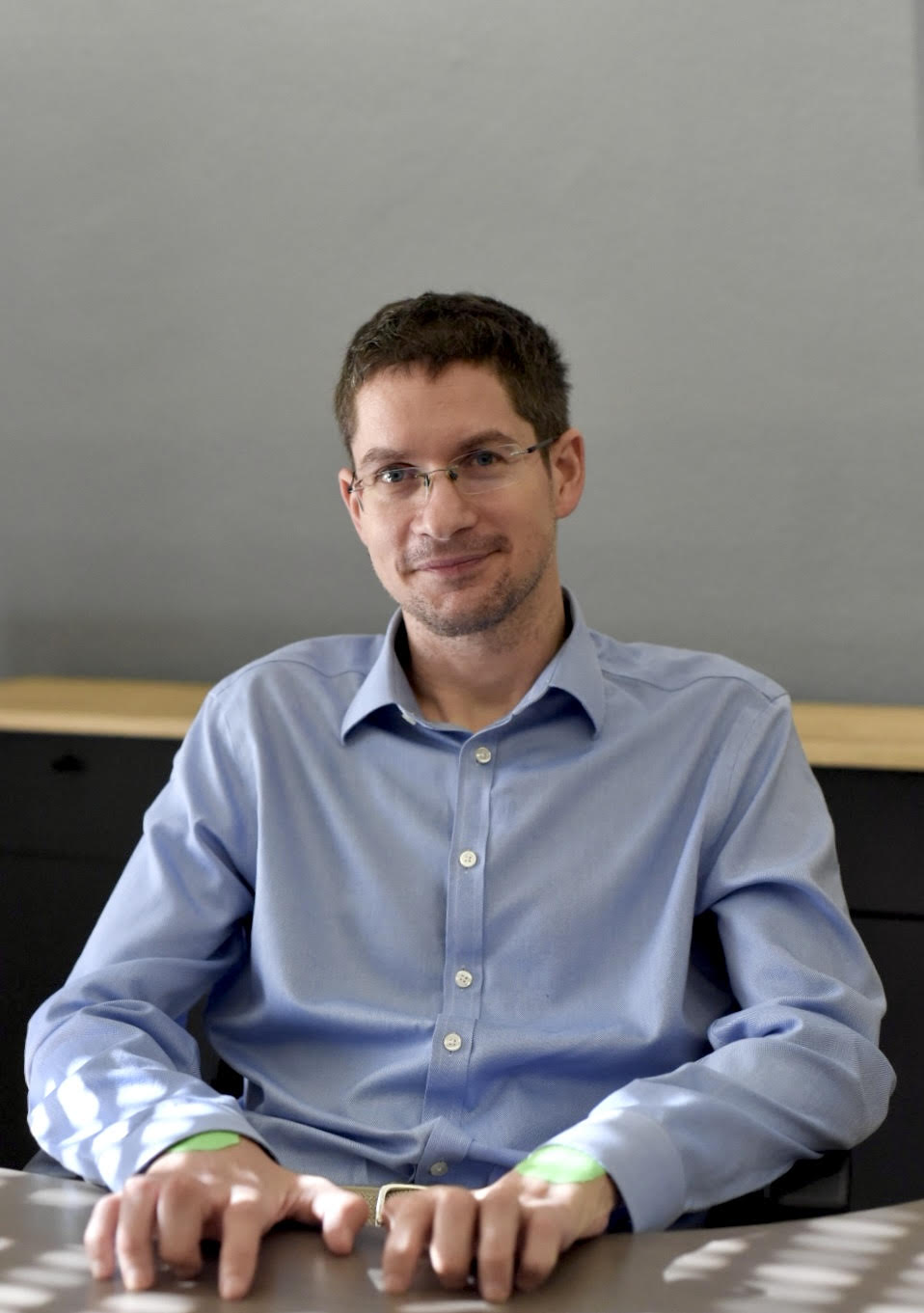
- Karsai in 2023
- Born: 28 March 1977; Budapest
- Died: 28 September 2024 (aged 47)
- Cause of death: ALS
- Education: ELTE Faculty of Law
- Occupation: constitutional lawyer
- Father: László Karsai

Dániel András Karsai (Note: Hungarian: [ˈdaːniɛl ˈɒndraːʃ ˈkɒrʃɒi]) (28 March 1977 – 28 September 2024) was a Hungarian constitutional lawyer and euthanasia activist. Born in Budapest, he studied at Eötvös Loránd University's Faculty of Law. He worked at the Constitutional Court, the Ministry of Justice, and the European Court of Human Rights. After returning to Hungary, he founded his law firm.

In 2022, Karsai was diagnosed with the fatal motor neuron disease ALS. He campaigned to legalize active euthanasia in Hungary, which was opposed by the ruling Fidesz party. Karsai discussed with several high-ranking politicians and also proposed a referendum, but to no avail. He filed a claim at the European Court of Human Rights, but the court ruled against him in June 2024, and his appeal was denied in September. Later that month, he died from his illness. Although Karsai lost his legal cases, he received significant public support and considered the outcome of his campaign a success.

Karsai co-wrote the play Egy tökéletes nap (lit. 'One Perfect Day'), which was based on his story. A book of his writing and public remarks was published in 2024. Before his illness, he practiced jujutsu and often went hiking. After his death, the Hungarian Chamber of Physicians established a memorial prize in his honor.

== Early life and career ==
Karsai worked four years at the European Court of Human Rights, the same court that ruled against him in 2024.

Dániel András Karsai was born on 28 March 1977 in Budapest. His father was László Karsai, a historian specializing in the Roma and Jewish Holocaust in Hungary. His mother, Éva Kelemen, established and led the Center for Interpreter and Translator Training at the Budapest University of Technology and Economics. Between 1991 and 1995, he studied at Berzsenyi Dániel Gimnázium. He graduated from Eötvös Loránd University's Faculty of Law in 2001. He worked as a secretary for Constitutional Court Judge Ottó Czúcz for one and a half years. He then worked at the Department of Public Law Codification at the Ministry of Justice, and four years at the European Court of Human Rights. He returned to Hungary in 2009 to practice law and founded his law firm in 2011, which won numerous notable cases. He regularly gave television interviews regarding human rights issues. Karsai was among Haszon's 100 best Hungarian lawyers list in 2016.

== Illness and euthanasia activism ==
Karsai first noticed symptoms in June 2021. In August 2022, he was diagnosed with the incurable motor neuron disease ALS, which over time leads to complete paralysis and slow death. In September 2023, he began campaigning to legalize active euthanasia, opposed by the then-ruling Fidesz party. He argued this ban was against fundamental human rights, such as the right to self-determination, the prohibition of inhuman and degrading treatment, and the right to freely choose one's worldview. In January 2024, he was in the hospital for twelve days due to an infection. In April 2024, he retired from practicing law. That month, his conditions worsened: he had pneumonia, he had to be fed through a feeding tube, and his speech slowed down. Once he was unable to care for himself, his family, friends, and nurse assisted him.

External videos
- Footage of the chamber hearing in Karsai v. Hungary (32312/23)

Karsai lodged a case at the European Court of Human Rights, hoping to decriminalize active euthanasia in Hungary. The government filed a counter-petition, requesting Karsai's request be inadmissible. The trial was held in November 2023, where an expert was heard. Another hearing was held in January 2024. The court ruled against Karsai on 13 June 2024. In a 6:1 decision, the court ruled that denying euthanasia did not infringe upon fundamental rights. In August, Karsai appealed to the Grand Chamber, which was denied in September. Although Karsai lost his legal cases, he received significant public support. He considered the outcome of his campaign a success, as he believed his work had helped make euthanasia a public matter in the nation.

Prime Minister Viktor Orbán said in 2023 that "We stand with him, we sympathize with him, we wish him much strength", but his party's parliamentary majority refused to change the law. The minister of justice argued that the right to life, established in the Fundamental Law, was inviolable. According to a 2023 Medián poll, two-thirds of Hungarians support euthanasia, despite the country's social conservative tradition. In 2024, tens of thousands of Hungarians were similarly ill, unable to access euthanasia.

In November 2023, Karsai visited the Parliament to discuss legalizing euthanasia. Momentum and Párbeszéd MPs assured him of their support; Fidesz–KDNP MPs walked past him, except Minister Lajos Kósa. A few days later, Karsai talked privately with Kósa, who supported Karsai's proposal for a referendum to decriminalize assisted suicide for terminally ill patients. The proposal was later denied by the National Election Commission; the appeal was declined by the Curia and the Constitutional Court. They argued that a constitutional amendment would be needed for decriminalization.

Bishop Zoltán Balog wrote a letter to Karsai, after which Karsai invited Balog to a public discussion. The Reformed bishop accepted, but the synod asked the ex-minister to cease public discussion regarding euthanasia. Karsai stated that President Katalin Novák was not closed-minded when he asked her to pardon those assisting in euthanasia. Following her resignation, he continued discussions with President Tamás Sulyok, but he declined. Minister Gergely Gulyás said to Karsai that, as a religious person, he could not imagine authorizing the taking of another's life.

Párbeszéd MP Tímea Szabó proposed to decriminalize assisting in euthanasia. According to her, only allowing passive euthanasia is discriminatory. Karsai spoke to the Justice Committee, saying that if he and people with incurable illnesses had the opportunity to decide with dignity how their lives would end, the Fundamental Law would not be violated. Fidesz committee members did not speak up, and they voted down parliamentary debate of the proposal.

Karsai, Zita Szenteczki, and Bence Bíró wrote the play Egy tökéletes nap (lit. 'One Perfect Day'), which was based on his story. It premiered in June 2024 at the 6szín theater in Budapest. Katalin Lőrinc played a fragile woman on Karsai's (Dávid Vizi) back, representing ALS. In October, a book with the same name was published of the transcript of the play, interviews with the creators, and Karsai's public remarks.

== Personal life ==
Karsai played soccer in Láng Vasas, Műegyetemi AFC, the Council of Europe's team, and AS Neudorf. He practiced jujutsu for eleven years, reaching brown belt and first dan. He completed the National Blue Trail twice, climbed Kala Patthar, and visited a Mount Everest base camp and Machu Picchu. He was religious. In the 2024 European Parliament election, he voted for Momentum, as "the right to make end-of-life decisions was specifically mentioned in the election program".

== Death and legacy ==
On 28 September 2024, around 4 pm, Karsai felt unwell and was taken to the hospital. He died calmly at 10 pm after his ventilator was turned off at his request. His death at 47 was announced by his brother that day. Momentum MP Dávid Bedő asked for a minute of silence in Parliament in Karsai's honor; Speaker László Kövér harshly criticized Bedő, calling his action a tasteless provocation and political propaganda promoting the culture of death. On 26 October 2024, Karsai's ashes were scattered at an undisclosed location outside Budapest. Around 30 of his family members and closest friends attended, while listening to Mike Oldfield and drinking a little alcohol, in accordance with his final will.

Following his death, the Hungarian Chamber of Physicians established a memorial prize in his honor "to support the aims of individuals and organizations fighting for dignity at the end of life". In early 2025, Péter Karsai (Karsai's brother) and Evelyn Frank (the managing attorney of Karsai's law firm) founded the Dániel Karsai Foundation (Karsai Dániel Alapítvány) to "continue the fight for the right to make end-of-life decisions, broaden the public dialogue on this issue, and educate people about it". The foundation held several roundtable discussions.

== Awards and honors ==
- Person of the Year, Magyar Hang (2023)
- Person of the Year, Heti Világgazdaság (2023)
- Person of the Year, RTL Klub (2023)
- Hungarian Civil Order of Merit (2023)
- Miklós Radnóti Anti-Racism Award (2024)
- Honorary Citizen of the Berzsenyi Dániel Gimnázium (2024)
- Pro Urbe Budapest Award (2024)
- Wesley Award, Hungarian Evangelical Fellowship (2024)
- SZABAD Award Audience Choice Award, HCLU (2024)
- István Bibó Democracy Award (2025, posthumous)
- Honorary Citizen of the 13th district of Budapest (2026, posthumous)

== Works ==
- Karsai, Dániel (2003). "A mulasztásos alkotmánysértés szankciórendszere". Jogtudományi Közlöny. 2003 (2): 91–99.
- Karsai, Dániel (2006). "A jogegységi határozatok alkotmányossági vizsgálata". Fundamentum. 2006 (1): 103–110.
- Szüts, Korinna; Karsai, Dániel; Mándi, Gábor (2006). Az Alkotmánybíróság egyes határozatainak ismertetése: segédanyag a Jogi szakvizsgához és az alkotmányjog záróvizsgához (in Hungarian). Budapest: Rejtjel. ISBN 9637255230.
- Karsai, Dániel (2013). "Rekviem a közjogi érvénytelenségért". Fundamentum. 2013 (1): 84–89.
- Kádár, András Kristóf; Karsai, Dániel (2013). Az Emberi Jogok Európai Bíróságának esetjoga a gyakorlat számára (in Hungarian). Budapest: Novissima. ISBN 9786155175572.
- Karsai, Dániel; Szenteczki, Zita; Bíró, Bence (2024), Egy tökéletes nap (play)
- Bíró, Bence; Karsai, Dániel; Szenteczki, Zita (2024). Egy tökéletes nap (in Hungarian). Minerva. ISBN 9786155637391.

== See also ==
- Assisted suicide
- Declaration on Euthanasia
- Legality of euthanasia
- Right to die
- Sanctity of life
- Voluntary euthanasia
