= The End of a Family Story =

1977 novel by Péter Nádas

- First edition
- Author: Péter Nádas
- Original title: Egy családregény vége
- Translator: Imre Goldstein
- Language: Hungarian
- Publisher: Szépirodalmi Könyvkiadó
- Publication date: 1977
- Publication place: Hungary
- English publication date: 1998
- Pages: 230
- ISBN: 978-963-15-0784-3

The End of a Family Story (Hungarian: Egy családregény vége) is a 1977 novel by the Hungarian writer Péter Nádas. The narrative follows a boy who grows up in Hungary in the 1950s, and whose grandfather tells him stories about their family's past. The prose frequently shifts in form and perspective. An English translation by Imre Goldstein was published in 1998 through Farrar, Straus and Giroux.

== Reception ==
Ken Kalfus reviewed the book for The New York Times, and wrote that its "tediousness is as profound as the themes it seeks to engage." Kalfus continued: "The difficulty -- no, impenetrability -- of this novel probably cannot be laid to the translator, Imre Goldstein, who collaborated on the more lucid translation of A Book of Memories. Here Nadas's method of telling -- or not telling -- a story does not seem to be dependent on the translator's choice of words. Regardless of whose words they are, the structure that encloses them fails to intensify their emotional charge."

== See also ==
- 1977 in literature
- Hungarian literature
