= Balázs Martos =

Hungarian electrical engineer (1952–2026)

Balázs Martos (1 October 1952 – 13 June 2026) was a Hungarian electrical engineer, computer network IT specialist, and one of the "fathers" of the Hungarian Internet.

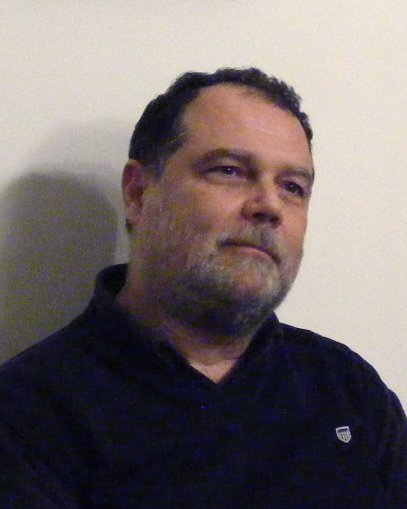
Martos in 2009

== Life and career ==
Martos was born on 1 October 1952 in Budapest. He graduated in electrical engineering from the Budapest University of Technology and Economics in 1977, and he spent his career at the Hungarian Academy of Sciences' Institute for Computer Science and Control (SZTAKI), where he led pioneering networking and computing projects, including work that helped establish the country's first nationwide academic network, Hungarnet.

In the 1990s, he became the first administrative manager of the .hu top-level domain, developed Hungary's domain registration system, spearheaded the creation of the HBONE academic backbone network and the Budapest Internet Exchange (BIX), and co-founded the Internet Service Providers Council (ISZT), serving for many years as its president and later its honorary president.

He was regarded as one of the founders of the Hungarian internet, and also championed the preservation of Hungary's digital history through support for initiatives such as the Hungarian Electronic Library and information technology heritage projects.

He died on 13 June 2026, aged 73.
