= Würth-Preis für Europäische Literatur =

German literary award

Würth-Preis für Europäische Literatur is a biennial German literary award given to an author. The prize is €25,000 and is open to any European authors. It is one of a series of awards given by the Würth Foundation (Stiftung Würth) in Künzelsau, a cultural organization supported by the Würth Group. The prize has been awarded since 1998, for "literary efforts for the cultural diversity of Europe".

== Winners ==
- 1998 Hermann Lenz
- 2000 Claudio Magris
- 2002 Claude Vigée
- 2004 Harald Hartung
- 2006 Herta Müller
- 2008 Peter Turrini
- 2010 Ilija Trojanow
- 2012 Hanna Krall
- 2014 Péter Nádas
- 2016 Peter Handke
- 2018 Christoph Ransmayr
- 2020 David Grossman
- 2022 Annie Ernaux
- 2024 Colm Tóibín
- 2026 Hervé Le Tellier
