= Claude Vigée =

French poet and academic (1921–2020)

Claude Vigée (born Claude Andre Strauss; 3 January 1921 – 2 October 2020) was a French poet who wrote in French and Alsatian. He described himself as a "Jew and an Alsatian, thus doubly Alsatian and doubly Jewish".

== Life ==
Vigée was born in Bischwiller, Bas-Rhin, the son of Germaine (Meyer), a homemaker, and Robert Strauss, who worked in business. He was descended from an old family of Alsatian cloth merchants. He spent his youth in Bischwiller, then attended secondary school in Strasbourg. Displaced from Alsace by the invasion of the Germans in 1940, he began to study medicine in Toulouse before joining the Résistance. In 1942, he published his first poems in the underground magazine "Poésie 42". He fled to the United States in 1943, where he obtained his doctorate in Romance Languages and Literature in 1947. He taught French Language and Literature at Ohio State University, then at Wellesley College and then at Brandeis University. Since 1950, he has regularly published his poetry in France. He lived in Israel between 1960 and 2001, where he taught at the Hebrew University of Jerusalem until his retirement in 1983. On March 18, 2000, the "Claude Vigée" Cultural Center was opened in his home city of Bischwiller.

Vigée died in Paris on 2 October 2020 at the age of 99. Among other subjects, Vigée's poetry discusses the suffering of the Jews, the Alsatians, the Alsatian Jews and the Jews in Alsace, but he also deals with the beauty and the transitoriness of the simple, rural heritage. The pursuit for peace and interpersonal accord is also a recurring motif. From his first collection, La Lutte avec l'ange (1949) he imposes himself by the tone both biblical and rilkean of his language, the magnitude of his visions, the anguished fervor with which he seeks the face of God through the immensities of time and space, the happy spontaneity of his images and the symbolic value of which he knows how to charge: "L'humide et chaude nuit rendit coptif des songes Ce grand arbre irrite par les vents eternels." In La Corne du Grand Pardon (1954), L'Ete indien (1957), Canaan d'exil (1962) he has sometimes expressed in classics, sometimes in liberated verses, sometimes in prose, a feeling of exile which is probably less due to the fact he has long lived out of his native Alsace than that born in a Jewish family, he felt everywhere separated from his religious homeland. In Le Poeme du retour (1962), written after he had settled in Israel, he said, in a "militant" tone quite close to Paul Eluard's, his joy at having found the haven he was looking for, and to be able to work for the cause of his brothers; "Apres tant d'abandons, dr misere et de ruines Ce pays est vivant par la grace d'un peuple."

== Awards ==
Vigée is the winner of numerous awards, including the Johann-Peter-Hebel-Preis (1984), the Grand prix de Poésie de la Société des Gens de Lettres de France (1987), the Prix de la Fondation du Judaïsme français (1994), the Grand prix de Poésie de l'Académie française (1996), the Würth Prize for European Literature (2002) and the Elisabeth Langgässer Literature Prize (2003).

== Works ==
=== English Translations ===
- Flow tide: selected poetry and prose. Translated by Anthony Rudolf. Menard/King's. 1992. ISBN 978-0-9513753-7-2.
- Chants de l'absence. Translated by Anthony Rudolf. Menard. 2007. ISBN 978-1-874320-59-3.

=== Poetry ===
- La lutte avec l'ange (1939–1949) Publication 1950. Réédition L'Harmattan 2005 : Collection Poètes des cinq continents
- La corne du grand pardon (1954)
- L'été indien (1957)
- Canaan d'exil (1962)
- Le poème du retour (1962)
- Le passage du vivant
- Dans le creuset du vent
- Danser vers l’abîme
- Dans le silence de l'Aleph, Albin Michel, (1992)
- Les Puits d'eau vive, Albin Michel, (1993)
- Treize inconnus de la Bible, (1996)
- Être poète pour que les hommes vivent (2006)

== Bibliography ==
- Jean Rousselot, Dictionnaire de la poesie francaise contemporaine, 1968, Auge, Guillon, Hollier -Larousse, Mooreau et Cie.-Librairie Larousse, Paris
