= 2027 in Hungary =

- Decades: 2000s; 2010s; 2020s; 2030s
- See also: Other events of 2027; List of years in Hungary

Events in the year 2027 in Hungary.

== Incumbents ==
Incumbents
Position	Person	Party
President	András Baka	Independent
Prime Minister	Péter Magyar	TISZA
Speaker of the National Assembly	Ágnes Forsthoffer	TISZA

== Events ==
=== Predicted and scheduled ===
- 26 June–18 July – 2027 World Aquatics Championships
- 30 November–19 December – 2027 World Women's Handball Championship
- TBA – 2027 UEFA Women's Under-19 Championship

== Holidays ==
- 1 January – New Year's Day
- 15 March – Revolution Day
- 26 March – Good Friday
- 29 March – Easter Monday
- 1 May – International Workers' Day
- 17 May – Whit Monday
- 20 August – State Foundation Day
- 23 October – 1956 Revolution Memorial Day
- 1 November – All Saints' Day
- 25 December – Christmas Day
- 26 December – Boxing Day

== See also ==
- 2027 in the European Union
- 2027 in Europe
