= Győző Somogyi =

Hungarian graphic artist and painter (1942–2026)

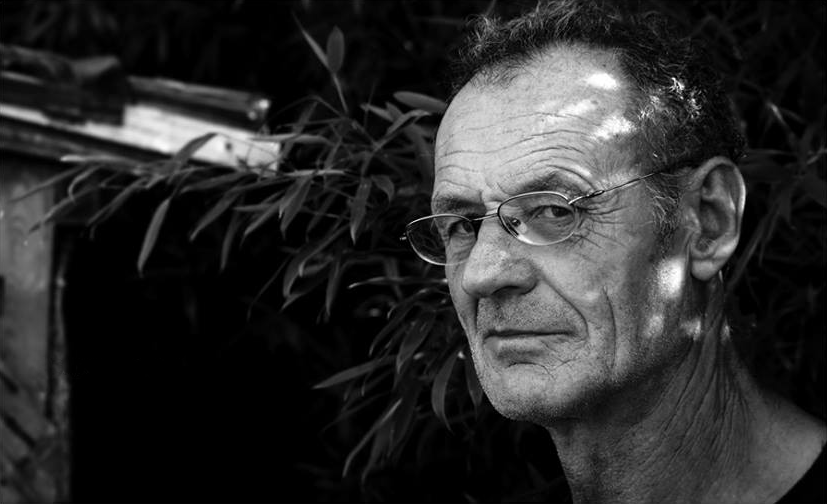
Győző Somogyi

Győző Somogyi (28 July 1942 – 14 June 2026) was a Hungarian graphic artist and painter.

== Life and work ==
Somogyi was born in Budapest on 28 July 1942. His art drew its themes from nature, everyday life, the Bible, and military history. He was characterized by a traditional iconic historical-folk style, with 20th century stylistic trends, including constructivist art, which also influenced him, especially in his landscape paintings. He created a painting of 100 portraits of Hungarian military history figures (1986–1996), which was originally published in exhibitions and in book form under the title The Portrait Hall of Hungarian Heroes.

Somogyi died in Salföld on 14 June 2026, at the age of 83.

== Awards ==
- 1977: Grand Prix of the National Graphic Biennial, Miskolc
- 1983: 15 March Award
- 1988: Mihály Munkácsy Award
- 1992: Pro Natura Award
- 1992: Hungarian Art Award
- 1994: László Mednyánszky Award
- 1997: Outstanding Artist
- 2003: Prima Award
- 2012: Kossuth Award
- 2014: Hungarian Heritage Award
- 2014: Artist of the Nation
- 2026: Commanders Cross of the Hungarian Order of Merit
