= László Kordás =

Hungarian trade unionist and politician (1969–2023)

Member of the National Assembly of Hungary
- In office 2 May 2022 – 30 January 2023

Personal details
- Born: 28 November 1969 Budapest, Hungary
- Died: 30 January 2023 (aged 53)
- Party: DK
- Occupation: Trade unionist

László Kordás (28 November 1969 – 30 January 2023) was a Hungarian trade unionist and politician. A member of the Democratic Coalition, he served in the National Assembly from 2022 to 2023.

Kordás died on 30 January 2023, at the age of 53.
