= Pest Megyei Hírlap =

Hungarian newspaper

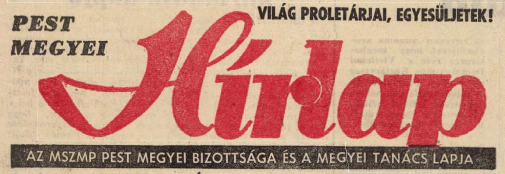
The header of the festive issue of the daily newspaper Pest Megyei Hírlap dated April 4, 1968.

Pest Megyei Hírlap (Hungarian pronunciation: [ˈpɛʃt ˈmɛɟɛji ˈhiːrlɒp], 'Pest County News') was a Hungarian newspaper, and was the organ of the Pest County Committee of the Hungarian Socialist Workers' Party and the Pest County Council. It was published daily (except Mondays), and first appeared in the 1950s.

== Activity ==
The change of regime triggered significant changes at the paper: in five years it had three editors-in-chief, and in the summer of 1992 more than a dozen people came to the county daily from the conservative daily Új Magyarország. In 1994, Gyula Horn formed the government, which triggered significant changes in the media market. The Pest Megyei Hírek, a county newspaper published by János Fenyő's Vico Rt., was launched as a county newspaper family of Népszava, as well as three local newspapers: the Váci Hírek, the Nagykőrösi Hírek and the Ceglédi Hírlap, which resulted in a drastic drop in the circulation of the Pest Megyei Hírlap. Ironically, Vico's Hírek essentially ceased to exist after a few months, but the decline in circulation had by then also crippled the Hírlap, and the publisher decided to suspend publication of the paper in early 1995.

The last issue was published on 4 February 1995.
