= Nemzeti Információs Infrastruktúra Fejlesztési Intézet =

- Abbreviation: NIIFI
- Legal status: Public institute
- Headquarters: Budapest, Hungary
- Region served: Hungary
- Director General: Miklós Nagy
- Main organ: NIIF Program Committee
- Website: www.niif.hu/en

NIIFI (Nemzeti Információs Infrastruktúra Fejlesztési Intézet) is the institute responsible for the development and operation of the network and services of the Hungarian national research network under the National Information Infrastructure Development (NIIF) Program. NIIFI collaborates closely with HUNGARNET, the association of users of the national research network. The combination NIIF/HUNGARNET fulfils the role of the National Research and Education Networking organisation (NREN) of Hungary. In September 2016 NIIFI based on a decree of Hungarian Government merged to Governmental Information Technology Development Agency (KIFÜ).

== Organisation ==
The NIIF Program is controlled by the Program Committee and managed by the NIIF Institute (NIIFI), under the umbrella of the Ministry of Education. The Program Committee consists of high-level representatives from, among others, the Ministry of Education, the Hungarian Academy of Sciences, the Ministry of Cultural Heritage, the Ministry of Welfare, the Ministry of Transport and Communications, and the Hungarian Science Foundation.

Funding for academic and research networking in Hungary comes from the central government budget through the Ministry of Education and financial management is provided by NIIFI, within the NIIF Program. The permanent core staff within NIIFI, serving the HUNGARNET community and taking care of the NIIF Program, consists of about a dozen members.

The history of the NIIF Program goes back to the mid-1980s. The present organisational framework is the outcome of a relatively long development process. The Program provides advanced technical and application services for more than 600,000 users in science, education and public collections in Hungary. The services are available for about 500 institutions throughout the country.

== Services ==
The main services offered by NIIF to registered member institutions are Internet access (backbone network, ADSL, dial-up), registration services (domain name registration, IP address domain allocation), email, webhosting. Additional services include database services, server hosting and mailing lists. NIIF also offers Voice over IP, a videoconferencing and desk-top conferencing service, and Videotorum, a video sharing portal for higher education, research and public collections.

In the middleware area, NIIF provides a key server service, a certificate authority and an LDAP directory service. NIIFI provides digital certificates through the TERENA Certificate Service. It also operates eduroam in Hungary. NIIFI hosts the Tier-0 Domain Name Server for the worldwide NRENum.net service. NIIF provides the Computer Security Incident Response Team (CSIRT) for the Hungarian academic community.
