= Béla Lattmann =

Hungarian jazz musician (1960–2026)

Béla Lattmann (20 June 1960 – 26 January 2026) was a Hungarian jazz bassist.

== Life and career ==
Lattmann was born in Dorog on 20 June 1960. He attended the Academy of Music in Győr.

In 2004 he toured the United States (New York, Washington, Chicago), participated in the Ankara Jazz Festival, the 2005 Joy Concert in Budapest, and the 2007 MOL Jazz Festival with Bob Mintzer.

Lattmann died on 26 January 2026, at the age of 65.

== Awards ==
In 2008, he was awarded the Hungarian Order of Merit. In 2018 he was awarded the Artisjus Award.
