= Parallel Stories =

2005 three-volume novel by Péter Nádas

- First editions
- Author: Péter Nádas
- Original title: Párhuzamos történetek
- Translator: Imre Goldstein
- Language: Hungarian
- Publisher: Jelenkor Kiadó
- Publication date: 2005
- Publication place: Hungary
- English publication date: 2011
- Pages: 1520
- ISBN: 9636763917 (Vol. 1); ISBN 9636763925 (Vol. 2); ISBN 9636763933 (Vol. 3)

Parallel Stories (Hungarian: Párhuzamos történetek) is a 2005 novel in three volumes by the Hungarian writer Péter Nádas. It comprises the installments The Silent Province (A néma tartomány), In the Depths of the Night (Az éjszaka legmélyén), and A Breath of Freedom (A szabadság lélegzete). The narrative portrays Hungary during the 20th century. The novel took 18 years to write. It was published in English as one volume in 2011.

== Reception ==
Thomas Marks of The Daily Telegraph wrote: "like many 18-year-olds, this novel has a tendency to take itself too seriously. Its insistent structural repetition can feel indulgent and, with its large cast of navel-gazing characters, its preferred mode of 'amplified inner monologue' intermittently falls prey to longueurs." Marks continued: "That said, it's with remarkable dexterity that Nádas splices together the political, sexual and emotional histories of two families, the Hungarian Lippay Lehrs and the German Döhrings. While theirs may be the parallel stories of the title, this is a boldly experimental novel that stubbornly refuses to follow straight lines."

American author Francine Prose said that "A year after reading it, I’m still urging people to read Peter Nadas's dense, filthy, brilliant 1,100-page novel, Parallel Stories." She went on to say "My husband read aloud so much of Parallel Stories that I figured I might as well finish the rest. It was as good as he promised, and we were both glad to have someone to talk to about this crazy book."

== See also ==
- 2005 in literature
- Hungarian literature
