= Egon Schmidt =

Hungarian ornithologist and natural historian (1931–2023)

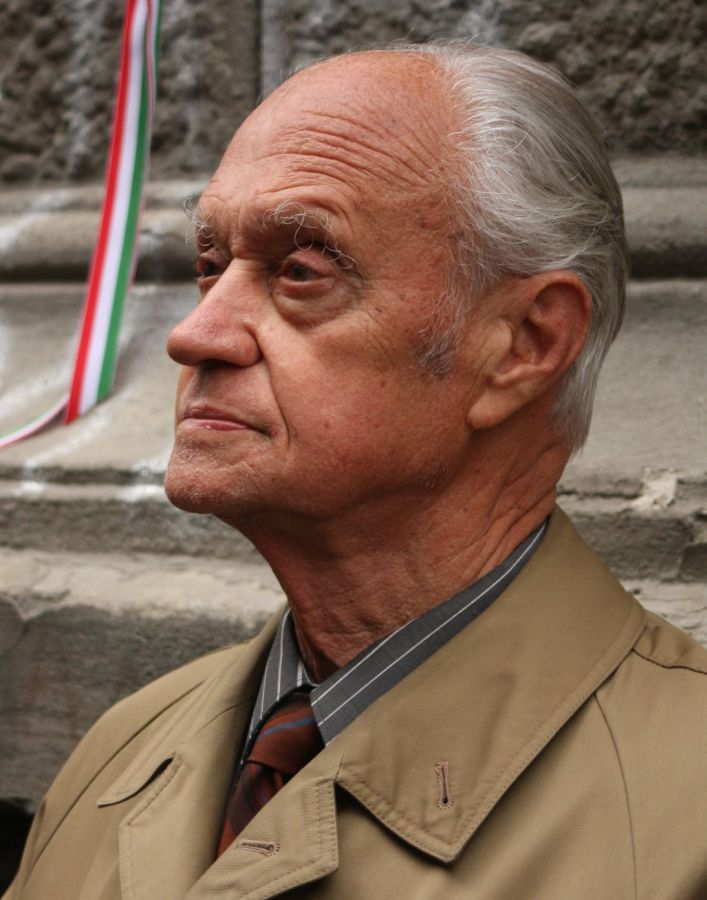
- Schmidt in 2009
- Born: 16 June 1931; Budapest, Kingdom of Hungary
- Died: 31 January 2023 (aged 91); Budapest, Hungary
- Occupation(s): Ornithologist and natural historian

Egon Schmidt (16 June 1931 – 31 January 2023) was a Hungarian ornithologist and natural historian.

== Life and career ==
Born in Budapest, Schmidt spent his childhood in Becsehely. After his studies, he worked at the Budapest Zoo and Botanical Garden and later at the Hungarian Institute of Ornithology. He authored nearly 100 books and over 3,500 popular science articles. The main objects of his studies were the thrushes and the feeding of the owl species. He hosted a radio program about birds on Magyar Rádió for 17 years.

A founding member of the Hungarian Ornithological and Nature Conservation Society, during his career he received numerous honours and accolades, including a Pro Natura honorary plaque, the Kossuth Prize and the Ferencváros Award for Environmental Protection and Nature Conservation, which after his 2015 win was renamed in 2016 Egon Schmidt Award of Ferencváros. He died on 31 January 2023, at the age of 91.
