= Eszter Láng =

Hungarian painter (1948–2026)

Eszter Láng (3 January 1948 – 2 June 2026) was a Hungarian painter.

== Life and work ==
Láng was born in Corund on 3 January 1948. She earned a Bachelor of Arts from the University of Debrecen in 1972.

She painted in a contemporary style, blending traditional techniques with digital art.

Láng died on 2 June 2026, at the age of 78.
