= Gergő Oláh =

Gergő Oláh may refer to:

- Gergő Oláh (footballer) (born 1989), Hungarian footballer
- Gergő Oláh (singer) (born 1988), Hungarian singer
