= Gergő Nagy =

Gergő Nagy may refer to:

- Gergő Nagy (footballer) (born 1993), Hungarian footballer
- Gergő Nagy (ice hockey) (born 1989), Hungarian ice hockey player
