= Declaration on Euthanasia =

Roman Catholic Church document condemning euthanasia

The Declaration on Euthanasia is the Roman Catholic Church's official document on the topic of euthanasia, a statement that was issued by the Sacred Congregation for the Doctrine of the Faith in 1980.

Catholic teaching purports that euthanasia is a "crime against life". The teaching of the Catholic Church on euthanasia rests on several core principles of Catholic ethics, including the sanctity of human life, the dignity of the human person, concomitant human rights, due proportionality in casuistic remedies, the unavoidability of death, and the importance of charity.

In Catholic medical ethics official pronouncements strongly oppose active euthanasia, whether voluntary or not...

...no one is permitted to ask for this act of killing, either for himself or herself or for another person entrusted to his or her care, nor can he or she consent to it, either explicitly or implicitly. nor can any authority legitimately recommend or permit such an action.

....while allowing dying to proceed without medical interventions that would be considered "extraordinary" or "disproportionate". The Declaration on Euthanasia states that:

When inevitable death is imminent... it is permitted in conscience to take the decision to refuse forms of treatment that would only secure a precarious and burdensome prolongation of life, so long as the normal care due to a sick person in similar cases is not interrupted.

The Declaration concludes that doctors, beyond providing medical skill, must above all provide patients "with the comfort of boundless kindness and heartfelt charity".

Although the Declaration allows people to decline heroic medical treatment when death is imminently inevitable, it unequivocally prohibits the hastening of death and restates Vatican II's condemnation of "crimes against life 'such as any type of murder, genocide, abortion, euthanasia, or willful suicide'".
