= Salföld =

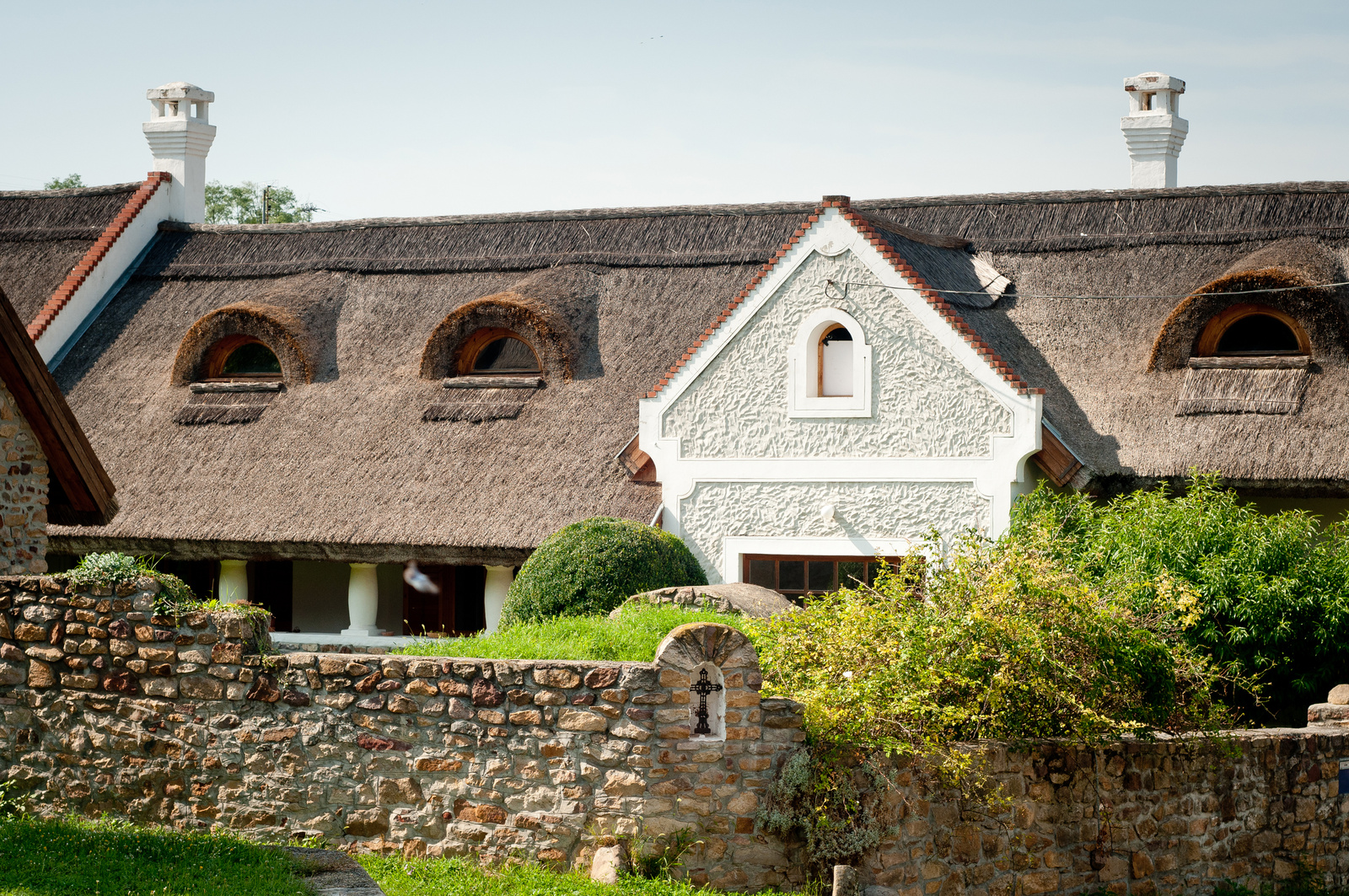

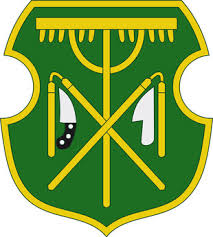
- Coat of arms

- Location of Veszprém county in Hungary

- Location of Salföld
- Coordinates: 46.83542°N 17.54916°E
- Country: Hungary
- County: Veszprém

Area
  - Total: 5.18 km^{2} (2.00 sq mi)

Population (2017)
  - Total: 71
  - Density: 14/km^{2} (35/sq mi)
- Time zone: UTC+1 (CET)
  - Summer (DST): UTC+2 (CEST)
- Postal code: 8256
- Area code: 87

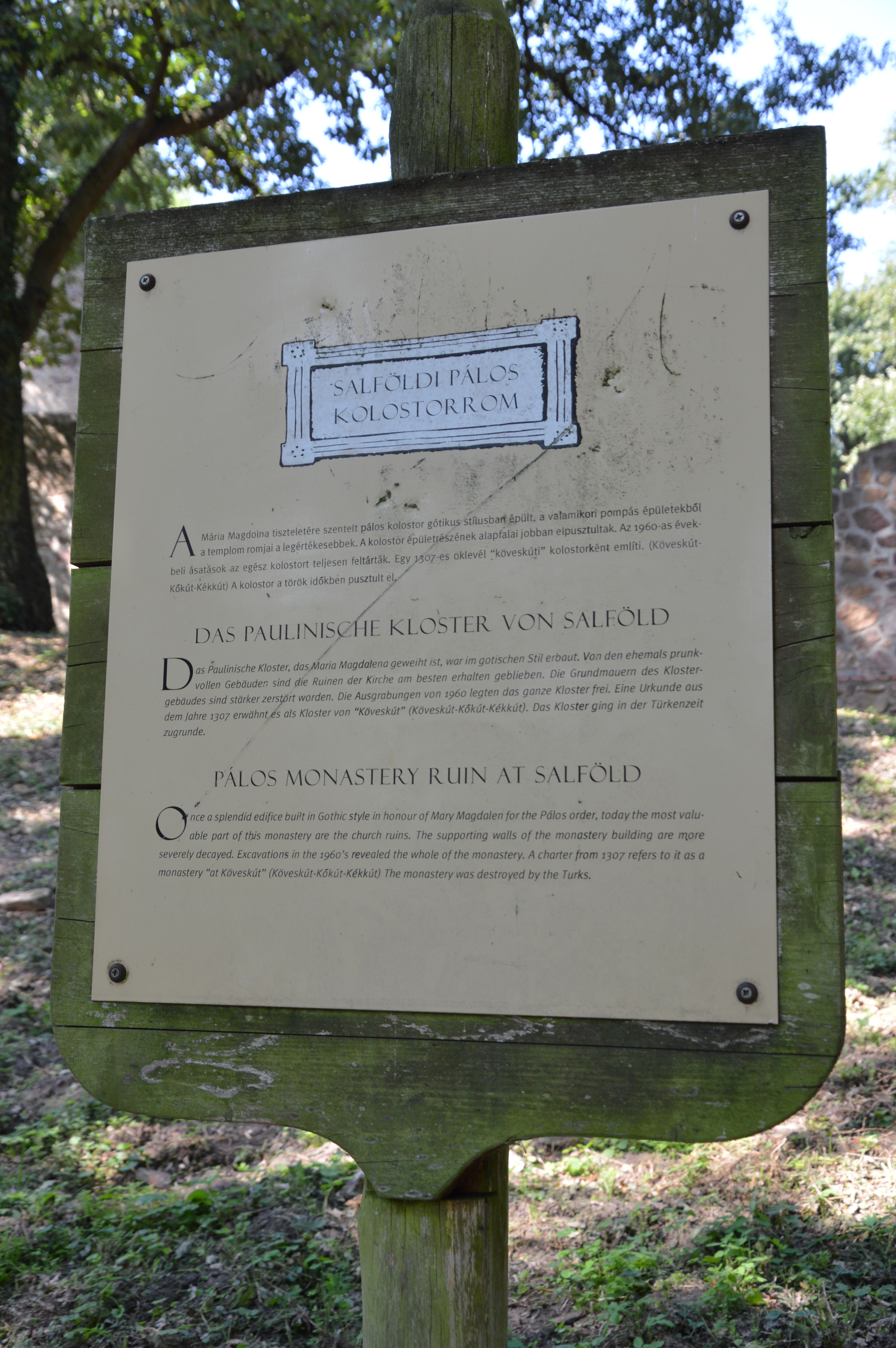
Information board at the ruins of the Pauline Monastery in Salföld.

Salföld is a village in Veszprém county, Hungary. It is home to a ruined monastery which belonged to the Order of Saint Paul the First Hermit.

Salföld is part of a protected area in the Kál Basin, part of the Balaton National Park.
