= Gergő Bese =

Hungarian Roman Catholic priest, journalist, and teacher

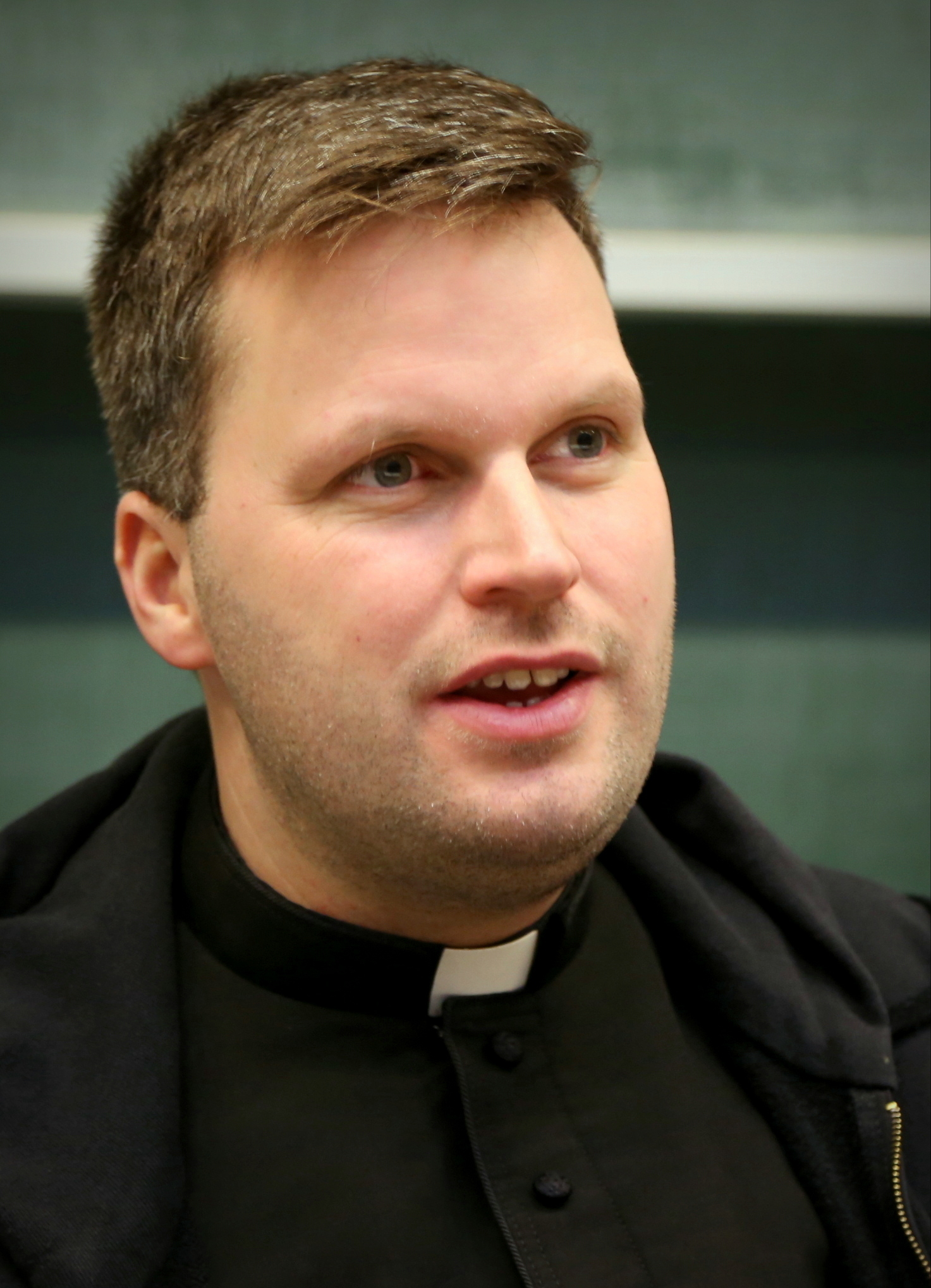
Gergő Bese in 2020

Gergő Péter Bese (born 23 July 1983 in Budapest) is a Hungarian Roman Catholic priest and pro-Fidesz social influencer. He was the parish priest of Dunavecse until his dismissal on September 6, 2024, following allegations of homosexuality.

He actively participated in the public religious life and community organization of the governments of Viktor Orbán. and was one of the most widely presented and broadcast church figures in the government-affiliated media and press organizations. He consecrated state offices, and received state funding for his pro-family organizations. As a public person, he was an outspoken critic of homosexuality, consistently opposing LGBTQ rights.

His scandal erupted in the fall of 2024, during which it was revealed that he regularly had intimate relationships with other men, and also attended gay sex parties. Archbishop Balázs Bábel suspended him, and the Orbán government and its media outlets removed materials related to him.

== See also ==
- LGBTQ rights in Hungary
