= Éva Keleti =

Hungarian photographer (1931–2026)

Éva Keleti (18 August 1931 – 6 February 2026) was a Hungarian photographer and photojournalist.

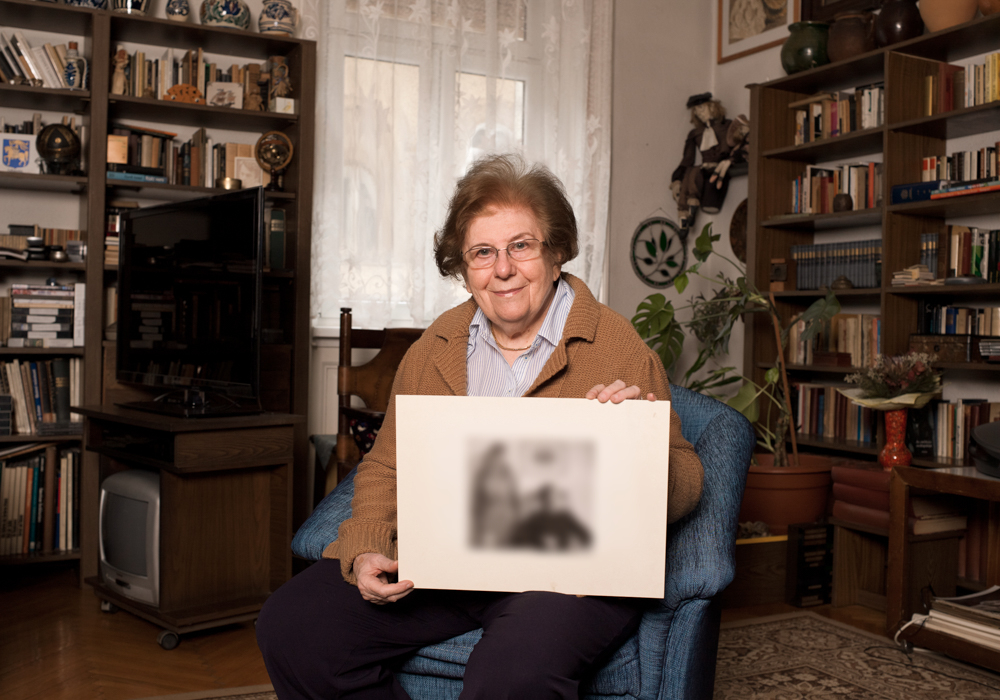
Keleti in 2012

== Life and career ==
Keleti was born in Budapest on 18 August 1931. Her father, Aladár Keleti, was a bank clerk and her mother, Veronika Kabos, was a housewife.

Throughout her career, she worked as a photo journalist, and photographer for a number of organizations, including Ferenczy Europress and MTI.

Keleti died on 6 February 2026, at the age of 94.

== Awards ==
In 2021, Keleti was awarded by the district of Terézváros. In 2022, she was named an Honorary Citizen of Terézváros. In 2023, she was awarded the Joseph Pulitzer Memorial Prize. In 2023, she was named an Honorary Citizen of Budapest.
