= A Book of Memories =

1986 novel by Péter Nádas

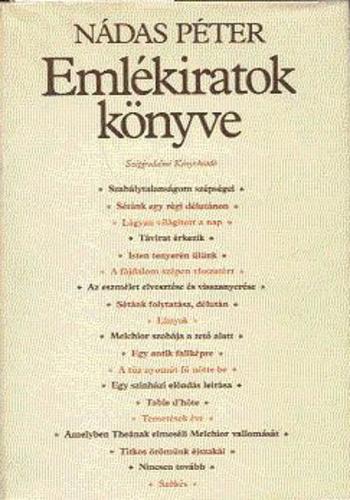
- First edition
- Author: Péter Nádas
- Original title: Emlékiratok könyve
- Translator: Ivan Sanders; Imre Goldstein
- Language: Hungarian
- Publisher: Szépirodalmi Könyvkiadó
- Publication date: 1986
- Publication place: Hungary
- English publication date: 1997
- Pages: 534
- ISBN: 978-963-15-3232-6

A Book of Memories (Hungarian: Emlékiratok könyve) is a 1986 novel by the Hungarian writer Péter Nádas. The narrative follows a Hungarian novelist involved in a romantic triangle in East Berlin; interwoven with the main story are sections of a novel the main character is writing, about a German novelist at the turn of the century.

An English translation by Ivan Sanders and Imre Goldstein was published in 1997 through Farrar, Straus and Giroux. The novel won the French Prix du Meilleur Livre Étranger in 1998.

== Reception ==
Under the headline "The Soul of Proust Under Socialism", Eva Hoffman reviewed the book for The New York Times. She wrote that "in A Book of Memories, Peter Nadas... has accomplished a remarkably interesting feat: he has transposed the novel of consciousness to the Socialist universe, and closed the gap between prewar modernism (inflected here by post-modern psychoanalysis) and Eastern Europe." Hoffman wrote that the novel has a style of details in "magnified, hot close-up", and that "Longueurs can have their plaisirs, as we know from Proust; but some passages in A Book of Memories are drawn out to the point of tedium or silliness, and the novel within the novel is marred by occasional affectation. Still, these are minor flaws in a work that offers a lot of incidental as well as major pleasures: quirky chapter titles, in the manner of Robert Musil ("A Telegram Arrives" and "Slowly the Pain Returned"); an astonishing scene in which two boys help a sow deliver her litter; a rare honesty about the conflicts of homosexual romance; and the colloquial freshness of the language."

American literary critic Susan Sontag called A Book of Memories "the greatest novel written in our time, and one of the great books of the century."

== See also ==
- 1986 in literature
- Hungarian literature
