= Róbert Puzsér =

Hungarian publicist

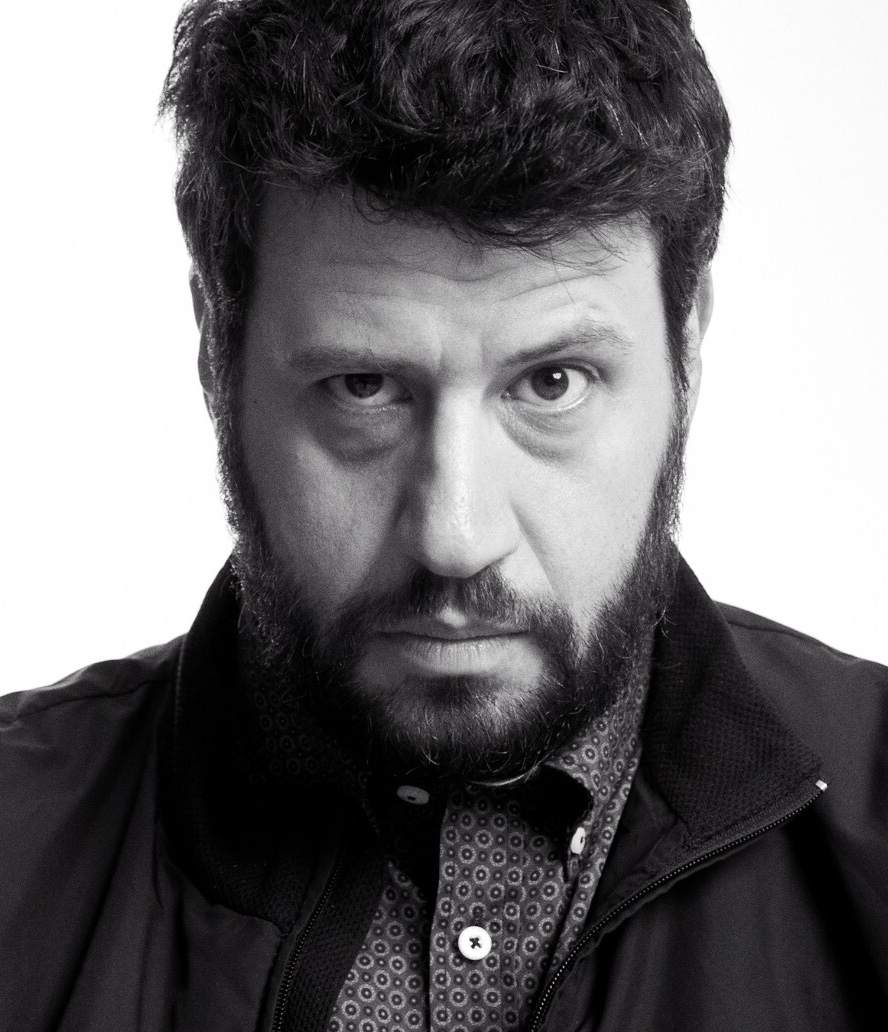
- Puzsér in 2019
- Born: October 24, 1974 (age 51); Budapest, Hungary
- Occupations: publicist, anchorman, editor, critic, comedian
- Years active: 2004–present
- Notable work: Csillag születik, Budapest Rádió, Budapest Televízió, kulturpart.hu

Róbert Puzsér (born 24 October 1974) is a Hungarian publicist, anchorman, editor and social critic.

== Life ==
His Jewish mother survived the Holocaust.

After he had graduated as teacher of History and Hungarian literature and grammar at Károli Gáspár University of the Reformed Church in Budapest, he worked at a secondary school as a teacher for one year. As critic of culture, media and society, he has been a regular guest in television and radio since 2004 and has had several stage appearances in the nightlife of Budapest. As free author, he has written magazine articles and essays for numerous portals, newspapers. He has been maintaining the online platform szelsokozep.com with several co-workers for several years, where i.a. his own criticisms have been published in written and audiovisual form, allowed to be discussed openly.

In 2012, he was a member of the jury in the fourth season quarter of the Csillag születik Hungarian talent show, in the wake of which he became known nationwide. His tough sentences and strict ratings made him a controversial figure, and his activity (although short-lived) implanted several fashion words and numerous phraseologisms into the Hungarian language.

He criticizes sharply, attacks (less frequently praises) various social phenomena, mainly within the field of politics, commercial television and tabloid media and the advertisement as an institute endangering democracy, capitalism and human rights.

He has launched discussions with reflecting more or less on public life. Meanwhile, without definitely joining the "wagon camp" of a political party or TV channel, he considers himself as an "outsider", although he was close to the party called LMP, therefore he helped the party by creating a campaign film, but later he moved away from the party.

He obtained a constant separate column in the Hungarian newspaper Magyar Nemzet in 2015.

In 2019 he was running for the position of Lord Mayor of Budapest. He finished third with 4.46% of the votes.

== Works ==
=== Broadcasts ===
- Gang (MTV, 2004–2005, regular guest)
- Szélsőközép (Budapest Rádió, 2005–2006, editor and anchorman)
- Demokrácia Rt.(Budapest Rádió, 2005–2006, editor and anchorman)
- Apokalipszis Rt. (Budapest Rádió, 2006–2007, editor and anchorman)
- Na, mi újság? (Budapest TV, 2007–2008, editor and anchorman)
- Lapzárta (Hír TV, 2007–2008, regular guest)
- Szigorúan Ellenőrzött Mondatok (Echo TV, 2008, editor and anchorman)
- Szélsőközép (RadioCafé, 2008, editor and anchorman)
- A hét mesterlövésze (RadioCafé, 2009–2011, film criticism– editor and anchorman)
- A hét mesterlövésze (Repetition of every broadcast: Jazzy Radio, since 2013)
- Csillag Születik (RTL Klub, 2012, member of jury)
- Ki Mit Tube (online talent show, 2014, 2015, member of jury)
- Aranylövés Puzsérral (SportKlub, since 2015, anchorman)
- Önkényes Mérvadó (Jazzy Radio, since 2015, anchorman)
- Szelfi (RTL II, 2015)
- Sznobjektív (Hír TV, 2016-, editor and anchorman)
- Önkényes Mérvadó (Spirit Fm, since 2020, anchorman)

=== Regular performances ===
- Reklámtörvényszék (Ötkert, Budapest, 2013, weekly – media criticism)
- Sznobjektív (Gozsdu Manó Klub, Budapest, 2012–2014, weekly – cultural criticism)
- Stand-up Tragedy (in several places, since 2012, social criticism)
- A Civilizáció Visszavág (Corvin Dumaszínház, Budapest, since 2015, social criticism)
- Apu azért iszik, mert te sírsz (Mika Tivadar Mulató, Budapest, since 2011, weekly, social criticism and philosophy)

== Books ==
- Forrás (Source, spiritual issues), Scolar Kiadó, 2008, ISBN 9789632440354
- Szélsőközép – a könyv (Far-Centre– the Book, social criticism), – Konkrét Könyvek – The * Sign Stúdió, 2012, ISBN 9789638966209
- A Hét Mesterlövésze 1 – Az 50 legjobb film (The Magnificent of seven days 1 – The 50 best movies, dialogical movie reviews), Scolar Kiadó, 2012, ISBN 9789632443874
- A Hét Mesterlövésze 2 – Az 50 legjobb film (The Magnificent of seven days 2 – The 50 best movies – dialogical movie reviews), Scolar Kiadó, 2013, ISBN 9789632444543
- A Zsidók Szégyene (Shame of the Jews, drama à thèse), Konkrét könyvek, 2014, ISBN 9789637424687
