= 2018 in Hungary =

- Decades: 1990s; 2000s; 2010s; 2020s; 2030s
- See also: Other events of 2018; List of years in Hungary

The following lists events that happened during 2018 in Hungary.

== Incumbents ==
Incumbents
Position	Person	Party
President	János Áder	Fidesz
Prime Minister	Viktor Orbán	Fidesz
Speaker of the National Assembly	László Kövér	Fidesz

== Elections ==
2018 Hungarian parliamentary election 8 April 2018
Party	Leader
Party vote
Fidesz–KDNP Viktor Orbán		49.27%
Jobbik Gábor Vona		19.06%
MSZP–PM Gergely Karácsony		11.91%
LMP Bernadett Szél		7.06%
DK Ferenc Gyurcsány		5.38%
Together Péter Juhász		0.66%
MNOÖ Imre Ritter		0.46%
Others		6.20%
Seats
Fidesz–KDNP		133
Jobbik		26
MSZP–PM		20
DK		9
LMP		8
Together		1
MNOÖ		1
Ind.		1

== Events ==
=== January ===
- January 19 – 2000 students protest the Hungarian education system at Alkotmány utca

=== February ===
- February 23 – Thousands of student protestors march from Deák Ferenc tér to Kossuth tér. After it officially concludes, a smaller group attempts to continue the protest by marching into the city. After a brief chase, they are encircled and checked by police at Vadász utca, near at its intersection with Bank utca. Later many of these protestors are fined to 50 000 HUF for jaywalking.
- February 25 – Opposition-leaning independent candidate Péter Márki-Zay is elected as mayor of Hódmezővásárhely against the Fidesz candidate with 57.49% of the vote. He becomes a symbol of opposition co-ordination for the upcoming election.

=== March ===
- March 15 – Student protestors march from the Hungarian Opera to the National Museum

=== April ===
- April 8 – Viktor Orbán's Fidesz–KDNP alliance, Wins the Hungarian 2018 elections in a Landslide preserving its two-thirds majority. Orbán and Fidesz campaigned primarily on the issues of immigration and foreign meddling, and the election was seen as a victory for right-wing populism in Europe.
- April 14 – Tens of thousands march from the Budapest Opera to Kossuth tér upon rumors of election fraud (We are the majority! - Demonstration for democracy).
- April 21 – The second We are the majority! protest marches from Kossuth tér to Elizabeth Bridge. Péter Márki Zay gives a speech.

=== May ===
- May 8 – Third and last We are the majority! protest at Kossuth tér, disrupted by a brief but heavy rainfall.
- May 16 – George Soros Open Society Foundations announce they will move its office from Budapest to Berlin amid Hungarian government interference.

=== June ===
- June 2 – After its poor election performance, the opposition party Together is dissolved.
- June 20 – Hungarian Parliament has passed the "Stop Soros law", for anyone "facilitating illegal immigration" will face a year in prison.
- June – two former Jobbik MPs László Toroczkai and Dóra Dúró form their own nationalist party Our Home Movement.

=== July ===
- July 18 – Hungary withdraws out of the Global Compact for Migration.

=== October ===
- October – A government decree signed by Hungarian Prime Minister Viktor Orban came into force, removing gender studies from the list of master's programmes. The subject will be banned at Hungarian universities.
- October 1 - LV of 2018. law on the right of assembly comes into effect.
- October 5 - János Volner expelled from Jobbik. Erik Fülöp and István Apáti also leaves.
- October 11 - Róbert Puzsér announces his campaign for Mayor of Budapest

=== December ===
- December 3 – Central European University announced it would cease operations in Hungary and relocate to Vienna, after the Hungarian government's refusal to sign an agreement allowing it to continue operations in Hungary.
- December 8 – The first protest against the Overtime Work Act. Police closes Kossuth tér from the protestors, but after pushing and shoving, they retreat from the square.
- December 9 – Ákos Hadházy protests in front of the MTVA building
- December 12 – Parliament passes an amendment to the Labor Code expanding possibility of overtime (Overtime Work Act), establishes two-level administrative courts. The opposition attempts to filibuster the act, then boycott the vote. The act sparks protests across the country. Police uses tear gas to push protesters off the stairs of Parliament. Similarly heavy protests follow the next two days.
- December 16 – 15 000 people protest against the Overtime Work Act, marching from Hősök Tere to Kossuth tér. In the evening, 2000 protestors continue the march to the MTVA building in Óbuda. 13 opposition PMs enter the building to read their demands and spend the night there.
- December 17 – In the morning, the 13 PMs in the MTVA building are removed by security. Hadházy calls for continued protest in front of the building, to which thousands arrive. Protestors march around Óbuda to the Mediaworks and Hír TV buildings.
- December 20 – President János Áder signs the Overtime Work Act
- December 21 – Hungarian Two-Tailed Dog Party organizes a "Christmas Peace March" at Erzsébet tér, a parody of CÖF's peace marches. Protestors against the Overtime Work Act march from Kossuth tér to the Sándor Palace.

== Deaths ==
=== January ===
- 5 January – István Sándor, 96, Hungarian Olympic rower (1952).
- 6 January – Elza Brandeisz, 110, Hungarian dancer and teacher, conferred Righteous Among the Nations.
- 28 January – József Merényi, 89, Hungarian Olympic speed skater (1952).
- 31 January – István Marosi, 73, Hungarian Olympic handball player (1972).

=== February ===
- 3 February – Károly Palotai, 82, Hungarian football player and referee, Olympic champion (1964).
- 4 February – Etelka Barsi-Pataky, 76, Hungarian politician, MEP (2004–2009).
- 9 February – István Hevesi, 86, Hungarian water polo player, Olympic champion (1956).
- 12 February – László Melis, 65, Hungarian composer and violinist.
- 22 February – Bence Lázár, 26, Hungarian footballer (Újpest FC, SV Würmla).
- 22 February – László Tahi Tóth, 74, Hungarian actor

=== March ===
- 4 March – Ernő Rozgonyi, 84, Hungarian politician, MP (1998–2002, 2010–2014).
- 11 March – Sándor Záborszky, 83, Hungarian Olympic swimmer (1956).
- 15 March – Francis M. Bator, 92, Hungarian-American economist and educator.
- 16 March – Leslie Gonda, 98, Hungarian-born American aircraft leasing executive (International Lease Finance Corporation).
- 26 March – Sándor Demján, 74, Hungarian entrepreneur (TriGranit).
- 28 March – Peter Munk, 90, Hungarian-born Canadian mine owner (Barrick Gold) and philanthropist (Toronto General Hospital).
- 28 March – Lívia Rév, 101, Hungarian pianist.

=== April ===
- 1 April – Etelka Keserű, 92, Hungarian politician, Minister of Light Industry (1971–1980).
- 12 April – Gyula Babos, 68, Hungarian jazz guitarist.
- 14 April – Frank Varga, 74, Hungarian-born American sculptor, cancer.
- 17 April – Judith Révész, 102, Hungarian-Dutch potter and sculptor.
- 23 April – Béla Magyari, 68, Hungarian air force colonel (Hungarian Astronautical Society).
- 28 April – Judith Leiber, 97, Hungarian-born American fashion designer and businesswoman, Holocaust survivor.

=== May ===
- 2 May – János Juszkó, 78, Hungarian Olympic racing cyclist (1964).
- 3 May – György Holovits, 71, Hungarian Olympic sailor.
- 23 May – László Tábori, 86, Hungarian-born American Olympic athlete (1956).
- 30 May – Ferenc Kovács, 84, Hungarian football player (MTK Budapest FC) and coach, Olympic bronze medalist (1960).

=== June ===
- 20 June – Sándor Kányádi, 89, Hungarian poet and translator.
- 22 June – Rezső Nyers, 95, Hungarian politician, Minister of Finance (1960–1962), Hungarian Socialist Workers' Party president (1989).
- 25 June – Andrew Dettre, 91-92, Hungarian-born Australian sportswriter.

=== July ===
- 22 July – István Ács, 89, Hungarian politician, Chairman of the Council of Debrecen (1966–1989).
- 23 July – Steven Béla Várdy, 83, Hungarian historian.
- 25 July – György Szepesi, 96, Hungarian radio sportscaster and football executive, Executive Committee Chairman of FIFA (1982–1994).

=== August ===
- 8 August – Pál Fábry, 99, Hungarian politician, MNA (1947).
- 10 August – László Fábián, 82, Hungarian sprint canoeist, Olympic (1956) and world champion (1958, 1963, 1966).
- 10 August – Árpád Fazekas, 88, Hungarian footballer (national team, FC Bayern Munich).
- 13 August – Gyula Szabó, 70, Hungarian Olympic sports shooter.
- 20 August – Ottó Heinek, 58, Hungarian politician and journalist, Chairman of the National Self-Government of Germans in Hungary (since 1999).
- 29 August – Mihály Petrovszky, 67, Hungarian Olympic judoka.

=== September ===
- 4 September – István Bethlen, 72, Hungarian aristocrat and economist, MP (1990–1994).
- 10 September – István Géczi, 74, Hungarian footballer (Ferencváros, national team), Olympic silver medalist (1972).
- 19 September – Győző Kulcsár, 77, Hungarian fencer, Olympic champion (1964, 1968, 1972).

=== October ===
- 9 October – Aranka Szabó-Bartha, 92, Hungarian Olympic sprinter.
- 13 October – János Konkoly, 78, Hungarian Olympic diver.
- 18 October – Judit Magos-Havas, 67, Hungarian table tennis player.
- 20 October – István Talabos, 62, Hungarian Olympic sports shooter.
- 26 October – György Károly, 65, Hungarian poet and writer.
- 28 October – Erno Polgar, 64, Hungarian writer, heart attack.

=== November ===
- N/A

=== December ===
- 6 December – Győző Forintos, 83, Hungarian chess player and economist.
- 6 December – Laszlo Lorand, 95, Hungarian-American biochemist.
- 7 December – Ferenc Hirt, 51, Hungarian politician, MP
- 12 December – Ferenc Kósa, 81, Hungarian film director (The Upthrown Stone, Ten Thousand Days).
- 25 December – István Levente Garai, 63, Hungarian physician and politician, MP (1994–1998, 2004–2014).
- 28 December – Attila Miklósházy, 87, Hungarian-born Canadian Roman Catholic prelate, Bishop of the Hungarian Emigrants (1989–2006).
- 31 December – Kató Havas, 98, Hungarian classical violinist and teacher.
- 31 December – István Seregély, 87, Hungarian Roman Catholic prelate, Archbishop of Eger (1987–2007).

== See also ==
- List of Hungarian films since 1990
