= 2017 in Hungary =

- Decades: 1990s; 2000s; 2010s; 2020s; 2030s
- See also: Other events of 2017; List of years in Hungary

The following lists events that happened during 2017 in Hungary.

== Incumbents ==
Incumbents
Position	Person	Party
President	János Áder	Fidesz
Prime Minister	Viktor Orbán	Fidesz
Speaker of the National Assembly	László Kövér	Fidesz

== Elections ==
2017 Hungarian presidential election
Ballot →	13 March 2017	
Required majority →	133 out of 199	100 out of 199
János Áder (Fidesz) Nominations: Fidesz–KDNP	131 / 199	131 / 199
László Majtényi (Ind.) Nominations: MSZP; LMP; DK; Együtt; PM; MLP	44 / 199	39 / 199
Absent	24 / 199	29 / 199

== Events ==
- 21 January – A bus carrying Hungarian students crashes near Verona in northern Italy with 16 people dead and 26 injured.
- 7 February The town of Ásotthalom led by László Toroczkai bans the Muslim call to prayer, and Muslim clothing,
- 13 March – János Áder is elected head of state of Hungary for a second term by the National Assembly.
- May – The World Congress of Families holds it 11th World Conferences in Budapest, Hungary with PM Viktor Orbán host.
- May – Former Leader of the British National Party Nick Griffin who was trying to emigrate, was banned from Hungary as he was perceived to be a "national security threat", according to security sources cited in the Hungarian weekly newspaper Magyar Narancs.
- 13 June – The Hungarian Parliament Passes a Law Targeting Foreign-Funded NGOs. The law requires civil groups receiving foreign donations above a certain threshold to register as organizations funded from abroad.
- 14 July–30 July – 2017 World Aquatics Championships are held in (Hungary) Budapest
- 7 August–20 August – 2017 FINA World Masters Championships in (Hungary) Budapest
- 4 November – Renovation of Metro Line 3 begins in the northern section between Újpest-központ and Dózsa György út stations.

== Deaths ==
=== January ===
- January 2 — István Tatár, sprinter (b.1958)
- January 19 — Paul Ornstein, psychoanalyst (b. 1924)
- January 22 – József Torgyán, politician (b. 1932)

=== February ===
- February 5 – Kálmán Katona, politician (b. 1948)
- February 26 — Katalin Berek, actress (b. 1930)

=== March ===
- March 4 — Péter Kozma, politician (b. 1959)
- March 5 — Antal Hajba, canoeist (b. 1938)
- March 8 – George Andrew Olah, chemist, Nobel laureate (b. 1927)
- March 15 — Imre Dimény, politician (b. 1922)
- March 18 — Alfred Tibor, sculptor (b. 1920)
- March 19 — József Szécsényi, track and field athlete (b. 1932)
- March 22 — Piroska Oszoli, painter (b. 1919)

=== April ===
- April 13 — Imre Tóth, boxer (b. 1948)
- April 23 — Imre Földi, weightlifter (b. 1938)
- April 29 – Mátyás Usztics, actor (b. 1949)

=== May ===
- May 3 — Attila Császár, kayaker (b. 1958)
- May 31 – István Szondy, modern pentathlete (b. 1925)

=== June ===
- June 5 — Anna Jókai, author (b. 1932)
- June 6 — Márta Rudas, javelin thrower (b. 1937)
- June 21 — György Rubovszky, politician (b. 1944)
- June 22 — László Marosi, comics writer (b. 1936)
- June 30 — László Kovács, football goalkeeper (b. 1951)

=== July ===
- July 11 – Éva Schubert, actress (b. 1931)
- July 23 — József Szendi, prelate of the Roman Catholic Church (b. 1921)
- July 25 — Erzsébet Bognár, handball player (b. 1942)

=== August ===
- August 10 — Katalin Csőke, discus thrower (b. 1957)
- August 18 — Lívia Mossóczy, table tennis player (b. 1936)
- August 30 – Károly Makk, film director and screenwriter (b. 1925)

=== October ===
- October 1 — István Mészáros, Marxist philosopher (b. 1930)
- October 8 — László Aradszky, pop singer (b. 1935)
- October 9 — József Tóth, football player (b. 1929)
- October 27 — Katalin Szőke, Olympic swimmer (b. 1935)
- October 30 — János Halász, basketball player (b. 1929)

=== November ===
- November 12 — Miklós Holop, water polo player (b. 1925)
- November 20 — István Almási, teacher, and politician (b. 1944)
- November 20 — István Konkoly, prelate of the Roman Catholic Church (b. 1930)
- November 21 — László Pál, politician (b. 1942)
- November 22 — Imre Hollai, diplomat and politician (b. 1925)
- November 28 — Alice Lok Cahana, artist, holocaust survivor (b. 1929)
- November 29 — László Szabó, Handballer (b. 1955)

=== December ===
- December 8 — Pál Dárdai, football player and manager (b. 1951)
- December 8 — Magda Fedor, sports shooter (b. 1914)
- December 13 — Charles Zentai, war criminal (b. 1921)
- December 14 — Ákos Császár, Mathematician (b. 1924)
- December 24 — Mária Littomeritzky, swimmer (b. 1927)
- December 30 — Gyöngyi Szalay-Horváth, fencer (b. 1968)

== See also ==
- List of Hungarian films since 1990
