= 2020 in Hungary =

- Decades: 2000s; 2010s; 2020s; 2030s
- See also: Other events of 2020; List of years in Hungary

The following lists events in the year 2020 in Hungary.

== Incumbents ==
Incumbents
Position	Person	Party
President	János Áder	Fidesz
Prime Minister	Viktor Orbán	Fidesz
Speaker of the National Assembly	László Kövér	Fidesz

== Events ==
=== January ===
- 12 – 25 January – The 2020 Women's European Water Polo Championship is held in Budapest.
- 14 – 26 January – The 2020 Men's European Water Polo Championship is held in Budapest.
- 24 – 26 January – The 2020 European Short Track Speed Skating Championships is scheduled to be held in Debrecen.

=== February ===
- 8 February – LMP – Hungary's Green Party changes its name from "Politics Can Be Different", and its abrriviation form "LMP" to "Greens".

=== March ===
- 4 March – The first two COVID-19 cases are reported in Hungary.
- 11 March - COVID-19 cases reached 13. Hungarian Government declared a medical emergency in Hungary, with several restriction to the general public, due to the rising COVID-19 cases.
- 30 March – the Hungarian parliament voted in favor of passing legislation that would create a state of emergency without a time limit, grant Prime Minister Viktor Orbán the ability to rule by decree, the suspension of parliament with no elections, and prison sentences for spreading fake news and leaving quarantine.

=== May ===
- 19 May – Hungary outlaws changing birth gender on documents.
- 11 – 24 May – The 2020 European Aquatics Championships is scheduled to be held in Budapest.
- 21 May – Two people are stabbed to death at Deák Ferenc Square, Budapest. Due to the victim's allegiance to Újpest FC, and the alleged Romani identity of the attacker, the murder sparks protests. The protests are organised by football ultras and the far-right Our Homeland Movement.

=== September ===
- 19 September – Former Mi Hazánk member János Volner founds the Volner Party
- 29 September – Mi Hazánk (Our Homeland Movement) MP Dóra Dúró says that the book titled Meseország mindenkié (Fairytaleland is for Everyone) is "homosexual propaganda". She tore out sheets and then shredded them in a paper shredder.

=== October ===
- 16 October – József Pálinkás founds New World People's Party
- 22 October – Renovated southern section of Metro Line 3 between Népliget and Kőbánya-Kispest opens.

=== November ===
- 7 November – Renovation of the middle section of Metro Line 3 begins between Nyugati Pályaudvar and Semmelweis Klinikák.
- 16 November – Hungary and Poland veto the seven-year EU budget, over attempts to link funding to respect for rule of law. They both said that linking funding to rule of law will mean a loss to their nation's sovereignty.
- 29 November – Hungarian MEP József Szájer resigns his position after having been caught by Belgian police at a gay sex party on the night of 27 November, in violation of local COVID-19 regulations.
- 30 November – Viktor Orbán surpasses Kálmán Tisza as the longest-serving Prime Minister of Hungary after 14 years and 145 days in office. (Index.hu)

=== December ===
- 4 December – Former Jobbik member János Bencsik founds Civic Response party
- 10 December – Hungary and Poland drop their veto on the EU budget linked to rule of law conditionality.
- 15 December – The Hungarian parliament passes a law that effectively bans adoptions by same-sex couples. According to the measure, only married couples can adopt children while single people must obtain special approval to adopt from the family affairs minister, Lawmakers also amended the Hungarian constitution, with a new definition for family as the union of a father who is a man and a mother who is a woman.

== Deaths ==
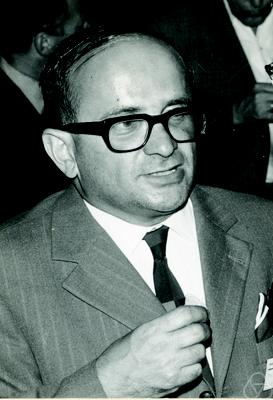
János Aczél

=== January ===
- 1 January – János Aczél, Hungarian-Canadian mathematician (b. 1924).
- 4 January – Károly Gesztesi, actor (b. 1963).
- 12 January – Miklós Vető, Hungarian-born French philosopher (b. 1936).
- 16 January – László Iván, psychiatrist and politician (b. 1933).

=== February ===
- 1 February – Péter Andorai, actor (b. 1948).
- 12 February – Tamás Wichmann, sprint canoeist (b. 1948).
- 24 February – István Csukás, writer and poet (b. 1936).
- 29 February – Éva Székely, swimmer (b. 1927).

=== March ===
- 1 March – István Balsai, politician and jurist (b. 1947).

=== June ===
- 9 June – Ödön Földessy, long jumper (b. 1929)
- 27 June – Olga Tass, Olympic gymnast (b. 1929)

== See also ==
- Hungary at the 2020 Summer Olympics
- List of Hungarian films since 1990
