= 2021 in Hungary =

- Decades: 2000s; 2010s; 2020s; 2030s
- See also: Other events of 2021; List of years in Hungary

Events in the year 2021 in Hungary.

== Incumbents ==
Incumbents
Position	Person	Party
President	János Áder	Fidesz
Prime Minister	Viktor Orbán	Fidesz
Speaker of the National Assembly	László Kövér	Fidesz

== Events ==
=== January ===
- 21 January – Hungary became the first European Union country to approve the Russian Sputnik V COVID-19 vaccine.

=== February ===
- 14 February – Klubrádió ceases operation on 92.9 FM.

=== March ===
- 3 March – Fidesz leaves the European People's Party group after the EPP Group's new rules.

=== April ===
- 1 April – The Polish Prime Minister Mateusz Morawiecki, and Italian former Minister of the Interior and leader of Northern League Matteo Salvini visit Hungary to meet with Hungarian Prime Minister: Viktor Orbán. It was wildly reported by the media they talked about forming a New Nationalist Conservative political group of the European Parliament to counter European People's Party group.

=== May ===
- 21 May – Former Jobbik representative Andrea Varga-Damm founds the ReforMerek party

=== June ===
- 5 June - an estimated 10,000 protest against Hungary's plan to build Chinese Fudan University campus with Chinese loans.
- 10 June - The Hungarian government announces proposes a new law banning the 'promotion' of homosexuality and gender change to children under 18 in schools, films or books.
- 15 June - The Hungarian parliament passes a new law that bans the 'promotion' of homosexuality and gender change to children in schools, films or books. Some people say its similar to The Russian gay propaganda law passed in Russia in 2013.
- 16 June - Széchenyi Chain Bridge is closed for renovation

=== September ===
- 5 to 12 September – the 2021 International Eucharistic Congress takes place in Budapest. Pope Francis meets with Hungarian prime minister Viktor Orbán.
- 18-28 September – First round of the opposition primaries. Klára Dobrev, Gergely Karácsony and Péter Márki-Zay carry forward to the second round.
- 23 September – The 4th Budapest Demographic Summit is held. Former US vice president (2017-2021) Mike Pence, Serbian President Aleksandar Vučić, Bosnian Serb leader Milorad Dodik, Slovenian Prime Minister Janez Janša and Czech Prime Minister Andrej Babiš all attend the summit.

=== October ===
- 7 October - Momentum Movement endorses Péter Márki-Zay
- 8 October - Karácsony drops out of the primary in favor of Márki-Zay
- 10-16 October - Second round of opposition primaries, Márki-Zay defeats Dobrev

=== November ===
- 15 November - Price caps for petrol introduced

== Deaths ==
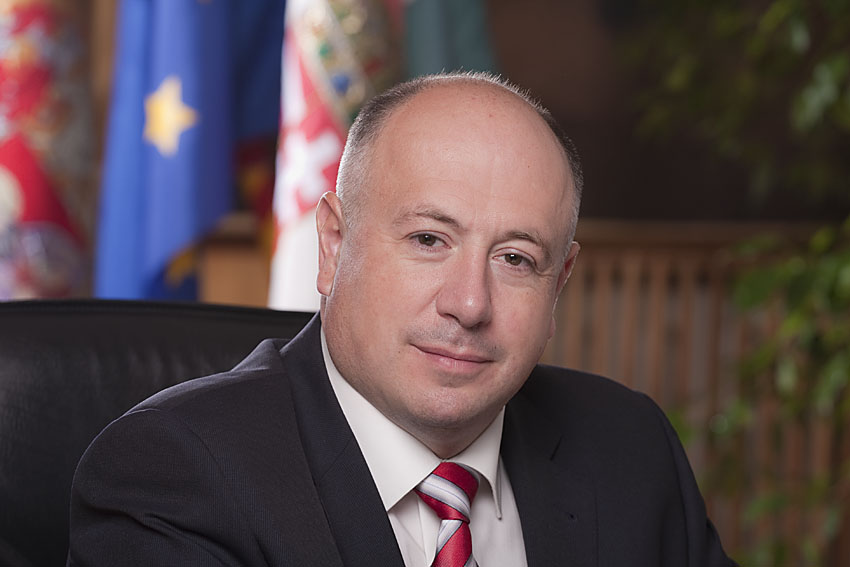
Ákos Kriza

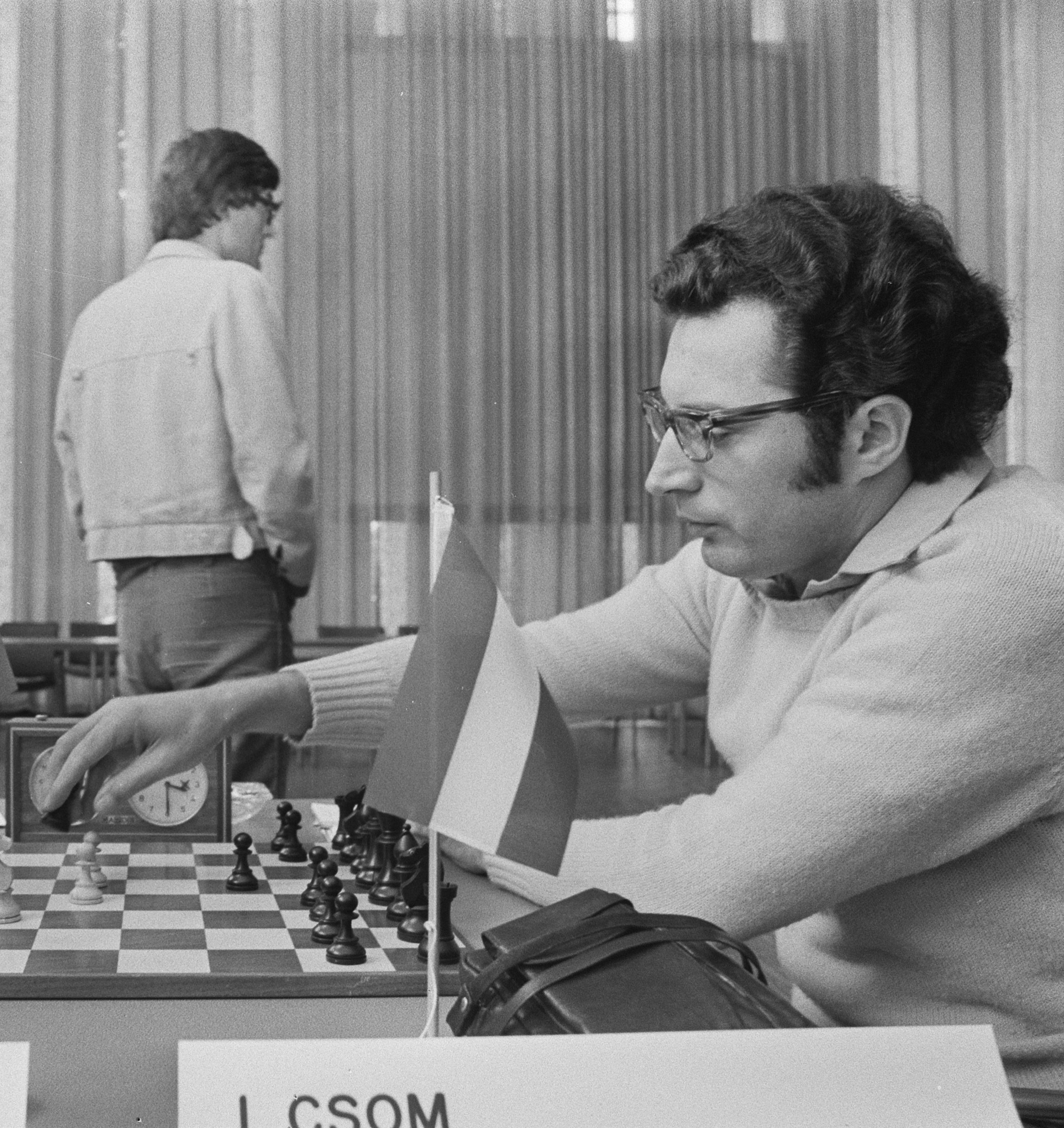
István Csom

- 5 January – András Haán, Olympic basketball player and sailor (born 1946).
- 18 January – Ákos Kriza, health economist and politician (born 1965).
- 30 January – József Csatári, wrestler (born 1943).
- 3 February – Albán Vermes, swimmer (born 1957).
- 1 May – József Hámori, biologist and politician (born 1932).
- 3 May – András Gergely, historian and diplomat (born 1946).
- 7 May – Pál Gömöry, competitive sailor (born 1936).
- 3 June – Alajos Dornbach, politician and lawyer (born 1936).
- 16 July – Thomas Rajna, pianist and composer (Seven Years in Tibet, Jet Storm) (b. 1928).
- 28 July – István Csom, chess Grandmaster (born 1940).

== See also ==
- List of Hungarian films since 1990
