= 2016 in Hungary =

- Decades: 1990s; 2000s; 2010s; 2020s; 2030s
- See also: Other events of 2016; List of years in Hungary

The following lists events that happened during 2016 in Hungary.

== Incumbents ==
Incumbents
Position	Person	Party
President	János Áder	Fidesz
Prime Minister	Viktor Orbán	Fidesz
Speaker of the National Assembly	László Kövér	Fidesz

== Events ==
- 12 January – The European Court of Human Rights rules that secret surveillance by the Hungarian Anti-Terrorism Task Force violates privacy rights due to lack of judicial oversight and safeguards.
- 28 February – Hungarian drama film Son of Saul, directed by László Nemes, wins the award for Best Foreign Language Film at the 88th Academy Awards, becoming the first Hungarian film to win the award since István Szabó's Mephisto in 1981.
- 15 March – Tens of thousands of teachers and supporters protest in Budapest against government education reforms, demanding reduced centralisation, better conditions, and fairer pay.
- 30 March – Schools in Hungary cancel first lessons as teachers, students, and parents protest government control of education and conservative curriculum changes.
- 12 April – The National Assembly repeals a law enacted in March 2015, which banned the majority of retail stores and commercial establishments in the country from opening on Sundays. The decision came into effect four days later.
- 8 June – Approximately 550 asylum seekers are stranded outside the Röszke and Tompa transit zones without adequate humanitarian aid.
- 5 July –
  - A new law takes effect allowing officials to summarily return migrants found up to 8 km inside Hungary's territory to Serbia; 6,000 police are dispatched, and 151 people are returned on the first day.
  - The ECtHR rules that Hungary arbitrarily detained an Iranian gay man, failing to account for his vulnerability due to sexual orientation.
- 2 October – 2016 Hungarian migrant quota referendum: A national referendum is held on the European Union’s migrant quotas. 98.3% of participants vote against the quotas, but turnout is 40%, below the 50% required to make the result legally valid.
- 8 October – The opposition daily newspaper Népszabadság ceased publication suddenly, with its owner citing financial losses and declining circulation.

== Deaths ==
=== January ===
- January 1 – Vilmos Zsigmond, cinematographer (b. 1930)
- January 7
  - István Komáromi, politician (b. 1943)
  - János György Szilágyi, historian (b. 1918)
- January 17 – Jenő Váncsa, politician (b. 1928)

=== February ===
- February 11 – Ferenc Rudas, footballer and coach (b. 1921)
- February 25 – Irén Psota, actress (b. 1929)

=== March ===
- March 7 – Béla Kuharszki, footballer (b. 1940)
- March 13 – József Verebes, footballer and coach (b. 1941)
- March 17 – Zoltán Kamondi, film director, screenwriter and producer (b. 1960)
- March 20 – Sándor Csjef, amateur boxer (b. 1950)
- March 25 – Imre Pozsgay, politician (b. 1933)
- March 30 – Marianne Krencsey, actress (b. 1931)
- March 31
  - Béla Biszku, politician (b. 1921)
  - Imre Kertész, writer and Nobel Prize laureate (b. 1929)

=== April ===
- April 1 – Emil Keres, actor and theatre director (b. 1925)
- April 2 – László Sárosi, footballer and coach (b. 1932)
- April 7 – László Bárczay, chess player (b. 1936)
- April 18 – Zoltán Szarka, footballer and coach (b. 1942)
- April 21 – Ferenc Paragi, javelin thrower (b. 1953)

== See also ==
- Hungary at the 2016 Summer Olympics
- List of Hungarian films since 1990
