= Blindekuh (operetta) =

Operetta by Johann Strauss II

Illustration of the operetta in the Austrian magazine Die Bombe (1878)

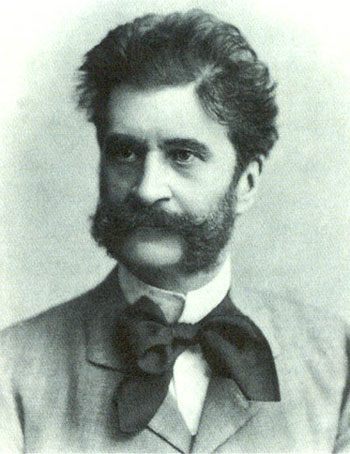
Johann Strauss II

Blindekuh (Blind Man's Buff) is an operetta written by Johann Strauss II on a libretto by Rudolf Kneisel. It was first performed in Vienna at the Theater an der Wien on 18 December 1878, its composition delayed by the death of Strauss' wife, Jetty Treffz. The overture was performed earlier at a charity event. The first run lasted sixteen performances, followed by performances in Hungary. The overture established itself in the repertoire of many orchestras and is often performed nowadays.

== Performance history ==
- 18 December 1878: Theater an der Wien, Vienna, Austria (conductor: Johann Strauss)
- 11 June 1879: (as Szembekötősdi) Népszínház, Budapest, Hungary
- 18 January 1935: Radio Wien, Vienna Austria
- 10 January 2019: Bulgaria Hall, Sofia, Bulgaria

== Roles ==
Role	Voice type	Premiere cast, 18 December 1878 Conductor: Johann Strauss II
Scholle, Gutsbesitzer (Landowner)	baritone	Hr. Eichheim
Arabella, his wife	soprano	Frl. Marie Seewald
Waldine, his daughter from his first marriage	soprano	Frl. Bertha Olma
Adolf Bothwell, Scholle's Nephew from America	tenor	Hr. Sigmund Steiner
Kragel, Court secretary	tenor	Hr. Felix Schweighofer
Betsy	soprano	Frl. Meyerhoff
Fräulein Elvira, Governess to Waldine	mezzo-soprano	Frl. Anton Jules
Johann, Scholle's servant	tenor	Hr. Alexander Girardi
Hellmuth Forst	tenor	Hr. Albin Swodoba

=== Supporting roles ===
- Wilhelmine, Philippine, Euphrosine, Katharine, Jacobine, Bernhardine, Valentine, Albertine, friends of Waldine
- Landrath Silbertau (District Administrator)
- Minna, his wife
- Frau von Sadowitt
- Cäcilia and Aurelia, their daughters
- Baron Hasemann
- Leimenreim, poet
- Quintenheim, composer
- Consistorialrath Kugel (Consistory Councillor)
- Fräulein Storch
- Frau von Frick
- Fräulein Schlack
- Herr Parasol
- Herr von Krack
- Herr von Knoll
- Herr von Puff
- Guests, servants, hunters, maids

== Synopsis ==
The action takes place on Scholle's estate.

=== Act 1 ===
Vestibule of an elegant country house with lawn, figures, flower plants richly ornamented. The decoration consists of two arches, front walls with side doors right and left – between the first and second arch Dienerschaff and guests. It is assumed that the stage forms a large terrace, three steps lead down into the main recess, which are bounded on the right and left by vases on pedestals. View of a park, which closes a garden gate with central gate, visible behind the same driveway and town.

The act opens in an elegant country house with a large garden. Different guests are gathered and they are enjoying the garden and the lovely weather. New guests keep arriving in carriages, amongst them Baron Hasemann accompanied by the poet Leimenreim and the musician Quintenheim, who are visiting to play cards with other guests and enjoy social activities. They are welcomed by the host, Herr Scholle, and his second wife Arabella. Other guests arrive, including district administrator Silber Tau, his wife Minna, and their children, who are running away from the dusty city to enjoy fine food and lovely weather in the countryside. Last to arrive is Mrs Sadowitt with her daughters Cecilia and Aurelia, who are there in the hope of meeting suitable male acquaintances.

Johann, the servant of the host, is a cunning and mischievous character. He tells Arabella about all of his previous misfortunes whilst employed with other noblemen and women in previous service. Johann escorts the guests to their rooms, leaving Arabella and Scholle alone. Scholle seems pleased that each guest is now accommodated and is looking forward to welcoming his nephew from America. He wishes to organise a welcoming party. He explains to Arabella that the reason for this is that Waldine, his daughter from a previous marriage, has been promised to marry the American cousin since she was a child. Arabella, who of course is her stepmother, is concerned that Waldine could be in love with someone else, but Scholle reassures her.

Johann returns bringing a letter, which is a bill from Arabella's Viennese stylist for the amount of 500 gulden. A brief argument breaks out over the settling of this bill. Johann returns escorting court secretary Kragel. They overhear the argument, which has now degenerated into Arabella's jealousy toward Scholle's exuberant behaviour with housemaids and other women. Kragel manages to calm the waters, but not without raising doubts in Scholle's mind about his wife's behaviour. After everyone leaves only Johann remains, who muses that nobody should stand between man and wife. He knows that Scholle and Arabella love each other, although they both have their flaws; one being Arabella's frivolous spending during her free time.

After Johann has left, we hear shots from the garden. Scholle returns and meets Baron Hasemann, who was shooting sparrows in the host's garden. Aurelia and Cecilia appear bringing bunches of flowers, which include Scholle's rare rose breeds. To make the matter more tragic, Herr Silber Tau joins them with his children, telling Scholle that they wish to pick cherries and apples from his trees. Scholle is desperate, as he is an avid lover of nature and hates the thought of innocent animals being hurt, his beautiful flowers ruined and his ripening fruit picked by others. Everyone disappears into the garden.

Waldine and Elvira, her governess, enter the scene. Elvira is trying to teach Waldine about botany, but all Waldine can see is the beauty of the flowers and plants rather than the scientific value, despite Elvira's best efforts. The conversation moves onto marriage, and we learn that Waldine is not happy at having been promised to the American cousin as she is in love with a young man named Hellmuth. Elvira leaves and Hellmuth, who overheard the conversation, joins Waldine. He tells her not to worry, as he has a plan: he will convince her parents that the two should be wed. Waldine is worried, as she knows that Hellmuth has a way of complicating matters and has a wicked sense of humour.

Arabella returns and Waldine, struck with panic, introduces Hellmuth to her as Herr Meyer. Hellmuth seizes the opportunity and tells Arabella that he is an employee of a jeweller from Vienna, and has been sent to collect her outstanding debt. Waldine is shocked and frightened by his audacity, but Hellmuth continues the deceit. Luckily for him, Arabella has many debts that she believes his story without question. Hellmuth's plan can now begin: he tells Arabella that he cannot return to Vienna until the bill has been paid in full and that he must remain in her house until such a time. Arabella is irate. Hellmuth, pretending to be a gentleman, kneels in front of her and asks for forgiveness. Johann enters and sees this and suspects that Hellmuth was proposing to her. He leaves again. Arabella is now worried that Johann will tell her husband about what he has seen, but she has a plan: she decides to introduce Hellmuth (Herr Meyer) to Scholle using a different name. Hellmuth is pleased that he may stay at the house and takes her hand to kiss it. Meanwhile, Scholle enters the scene and sees them. He is surprised but, rather than thinking that Hellmuth is making advances on his wife, he mistakes him for his American cousin Adolf.

Waldine has followed her father onto the scene and is amused by the situation in which Hellmuth has landed himself; he must even invent long stories to describe America to his "uncle".

Kragel and Elvira enter and Hellmuth is introduced to them as Herr Meyer. Kragel is puzzled, as he recognises Hellmuth as a young man he has met before in Vienna, which he voices to Elvira.

Everyone exits, leaving Arabella and Hellmuth alone. She tells him to stop this deception: he cannot be Herr Meyer and Adolf at the same time.

=== Act 2 ===
Park with statues. Fountain, trees, shrubs, etc. Left entrance of the country house, right arbour.

The second act takes places in the garden. Waldine and her friends are outdoors playing games. Hellmuth joins them and Waldine introduces him as Adolf to keep up the ruse. Everyone exits, leaving Waldine alone. A man approaches, introducing himself as cousin Adolf. Upon discovering he is speaking with his cousin Waldine, he tells her how sorry he is that he cannot marry her. The reason for his visit is to tell Scholle that he is already married and to pay his uncle 40,000 dollars, which was the fee agreed by both their parents if the wedding were to be cancelled. Waldine is elated, but she understands the difficult situation: there cannot be two Adolfs. Therefore, she asks him to allow her to introduce him as Hellmuth Forst.

The real Hellmuth returns. Waldine welcomes him and introduces him to cousin Adolf as cousin Adolf, and introduces cousin Adolf as Hellmuth Forst! Waldine leaves and the two gentlemen begin an argument, during which Hellmuth tells Adolf that he cannot be Hellmuth as he himself is the real Hellmuth. In a panic, Adolf says that his real name is Herr Meyer, a name that he knew from Waldine that Hellmuth used to introduce himself to Arabella.

Adolf leaves and Elvira joins Hellmuth. They are talking when Kragel joins them. He is still suspicious of Hellmuth, and again makes this known to Elvira. They leave and Scholle and Arabella return. Scholle is confused: Arabella tells him that in reality the man introduced as "cousin Adolf" is actually Herr Meyer, and the reason for his presence is to settle her outstanding bill. Scholle agrees to pay the bill quickly, on the condition that Herr Meyer is sent away immediately. They return to the house.

A young lady enters the garden and meets Hellmuth, who has just left the others. She introduces herself as Betsy, Adolf's wife from America. Hellmuth is shocked and pleased. The couple have come from America together, but Adolf decided to visit his uncle first by himself to take care of private business. As he had not returned to her, she decided to attend herself. Hellmuth tells Betsy of his plan: that if Scholle believes that he is Adolf, then he is Waldine's promised groom and will be allowed to marry Waldine. Betsy decides to help Hellmuth and gives him Adolf's wallet that he had left behind, containing his money and passport. Arabella joins them and Hellmuth introduces Betsy as a colleague of his from the shop in Vienna who is here to ask for payment from another bill.

Everybody returns, continuing the game of Blind Man's Buff that they had been playing.

=== Act 3 ===
Rococo style ballroom with picturesque perspective, the first arch or double arch (two openings) can be closed with curtains.

Act 3 takes place in the ballroom. Kragel and Elvira are talking. Kragel reveals that he is in love with Elvira, and she feels the same. However, before they can be happy together, Kragel has a task that he must fulfill: his work at the court is also that of Head of Police. He has just received news that Adolf Bothwell, a merchant from America, was killed in Hamburg and that his servant had stolen his identity: the name of the servant being Herr Meyer. Kragel and Elvira leave.

Everybody returns to the ballroom. Betsy is introduced by Hellmuth to Scholle as his wife, therefore he has come from America to pay Scholle the 45,000 dollars he is owed for having married someone else. Scholle is delighted, as he has received his money and Waldine is now free from any obligation to marry her cousin. Waldine enters and is told by her father that she does not have to marry Adolf. She confesses that she is very happy, as she is in love with Hellmuth Forst. Scholle asks who this Hellmuth Forst is, and Hellmuth, who is still masquerading as Adolf, describes Herr Forst as a wonderful man and an excellent husband for Waldine. Adolf enters and is confused. Elvira enters and screams, as she thinks that Hellmuth is the murderer Herr Meyer as described by Kragel, and recounts the story to the room. Kragel arrives with the police and goes towards Hellmuth to arrest him, accusing him of having killed Adolf.

The real Adolf exclaims that this is not possible, as he is standing there alive and well. Everybody is shocked that Hellmuth is not the real Adolf, so he reveals his true identity and Waldine says that he is the man she wants to marry. Scholle is confused by the whole situation and does not see why they could not have simply kept their true identities from the start. Hellmuth says that it was all due to his plan of marrying Waldine without causing controversy.

== Musical numbers ==
Overture

1. Introduction and chorus: "Welch' buntes Leben wird"
2. Couplet with chorus: "Es kommt ein Wagen an!"
3. Couplet: "Ich bin Baron von Hasemann"
4. Couplet by Johann: "Ich bin Gousmand"
5. Duettino: "Ein holder Frühlings morgen"
6. Couplet: "Schwieger mutter zu gewinnen"
7. Couplet: "Die Eisenbalmen weit und breit"
8. Quartet: "Ha! Ha! Ha! Was soll dies Lachen?"
9. Act 1 finale: "Ha! Ha! Ha! Traurige, schaurige, Situation, Ha!"
10. Introduction and chorus: "Duftige Blumen lasst uns binden Tulpen"
11. Couplet: "Wie sprießt so frisch das Laub am Baume"
12. Ensemble: "Ein Fremder kommt"
13. Duo: "Sie lachen über mich"
14. Couplet: "Jung und schon vom edlem Wuchsen"
15. Couplet: "Eheglück und Flitterwochen"
16. Terzetto: "Ja endlich find' ich Sie allein"
17. Act 2 finale: "Ja, ja nur zu nur zu!"
18. Cotillion and chorus: "Welche Lust bei diesen Klängen"
19. Terzetto: "O, Elvira theure Braut!"
20. Promenade quartet: "Beim Spazieren, amüsieren wir uns sehr"
21. Couplet (Betsy): "Küssen mag ich gar nicht gern"
22. Finale

== Recordings ==
- 2019: Dario Salvi (conductor), Robert Davidson (Scholle), Kirsten Kunkle (Arabella), Martina Bortolotti (Waldine), James Bowers (Adolf), Daniel Schliewa (Kragel), Andrea Chudak (Betsy), Emily Byrne (Elvira), Julian Rohde (Johann), Roman Pichler (Hellmuth), Sofia Philharmonic and Chorus, Naxos
