= 2019 in Hungary =

- Decades: 1990s; 2000s; 2010s; 2020s; 2030s
- See also: Other events of 2019; List of years in Hungary

The following lists events in the year 2019 in Hungary.

== Incumbents ==
Incumbents
Position	Person	Party
President	János Áder	Fidesz
Prime Minister	Viktor Orbán	Fidesz
Speaker of the National Assembly	László Kövér	Fidesz

== Elections ==
2019 European Parliament election in Hungary 26 May 2019
Party	Lead candidate
Popular vote
Fidesz–KDNP László Trócsányi		52.56%
DK Klára Dobrev		16.05%
Momentum Katalin Cseh		9.93%
MSZP–PM Bertalan Tóth		6.61%
Jobbik Márton Gyöngyösi		6.34%
Others		8.51%
Seats
Fidesz–KDNP		13
DK		4
Momentum		2
MSZP–PM		1
Jobbik		1

== Events ==
=== January ===
- 5 January – Protest against the Overtime Work Act, marches from Hősök Tere to Kossuth tér.
- 19 January – Nation-wide protests against the Overtime Work Act, including in front of Várkert Bazár in Budapest.
- 28 January – 3 February - First round of opposition primaries for the Budapest mayoral election. Gergely Karácsony (PM) defeats Csaba Horváth (MSZP).

=== February ===
- The Freedom House NGO states that Hungary is no longer a free country, making it the first such country in the European Union to be so designated.

=== March ===
- 30 March - Renovated northern section of Metro Line 3 between Újpest-központ and Dózsa György út stations opened.

=== April ===
- 6 April - Renovation of the southern section of Metro Line 3 begins between Népliget and Kőbánya-Kispest.

=== May ===
- 14 May – The Mi Hazánk party announced the party would be forming the National Legion, a uniformed 'self-defense' group similar to Magyar Gárda, the paramilitary wing of the nationalist Jobbik party, which was banned in 2009.
- 26 May – The 2019 European Parliament election is held in Hungary. Fidesz (EPP) wins the majority of seats, DK (S&D) and Momentum (ALDE) replace Jobbik (NI) and MSZP (S&D) as the main opposition parties.
- 29 May – The Hableány disaster: Hotel ship Viking Sigyn collides with and sinks the cruise boat Hableány in Budapest, underneath Margaret Bridge. 28 people die, mostly South Korean tourists.

=== June ===
- 20–26 June – Second round of opposition primaries for the Budapest mayoral election. Karácsony (PM) defeats Olga Kálmán (DK) and Gábor Kerpel-Fronius (Momentum).

=== September ===
- 6 September – The 3rd Budapest Demographic Summit is held in Budapest. Former Prime Minister of Australia (2013-2015) Tony Abbott attend the summit. During the summit Abbott would talk about immigration.

=== October ===
- 13 October – The 2019 Hungarian local elections are held. Fidesz loses the mayorship of Budapest to the opposition candidate Gergely Karácsony.

=== Late 2019 ===
- Hungary withdraws from the Eurovision Song Contest no official reason for the withdrawal was given by the broadcaster, an inside source speaking with the website Index.hu speculated that the contest was considered "too gay" for MTVA to participate.

== Deaths ==
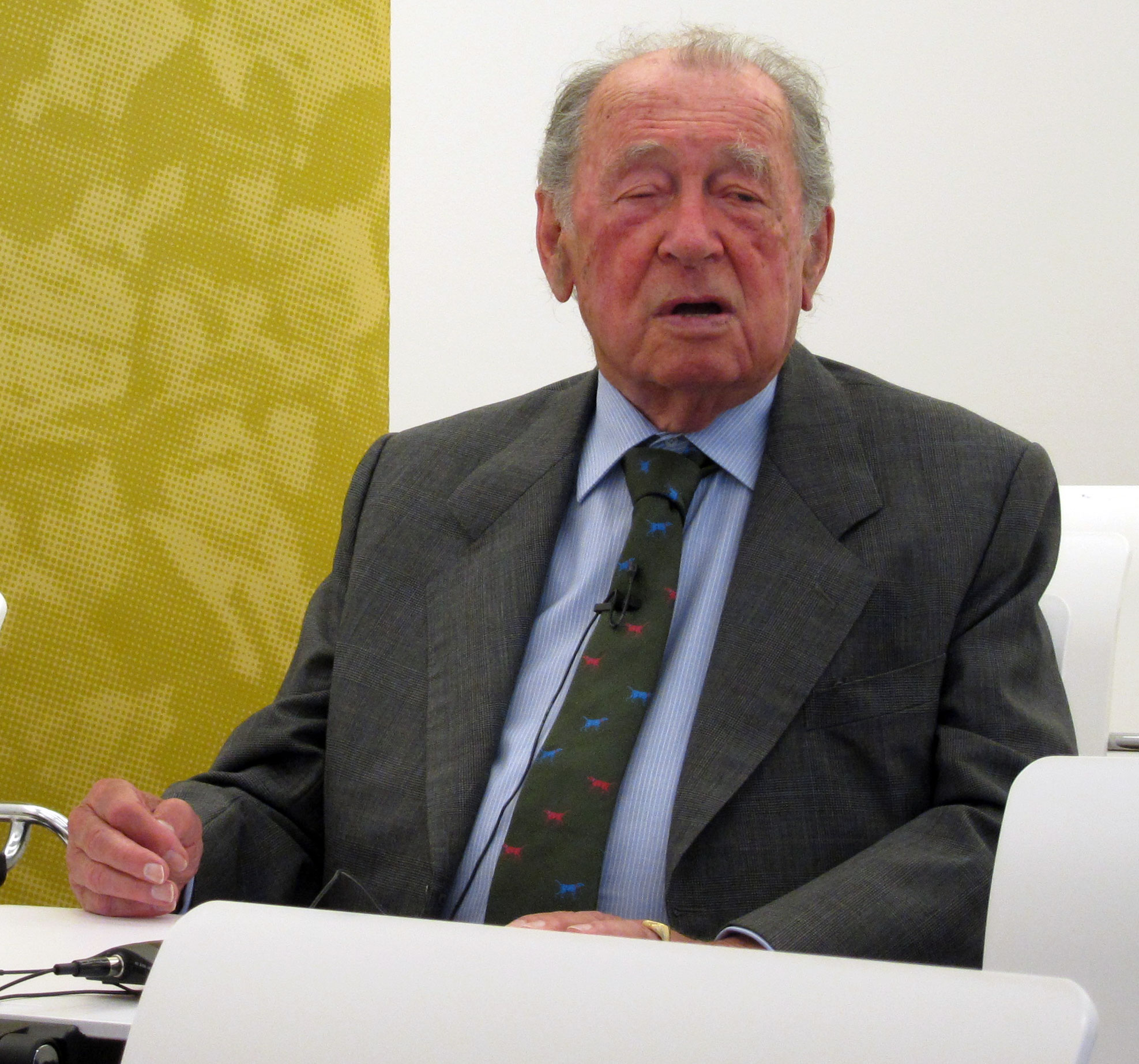
Anthony de Jasay

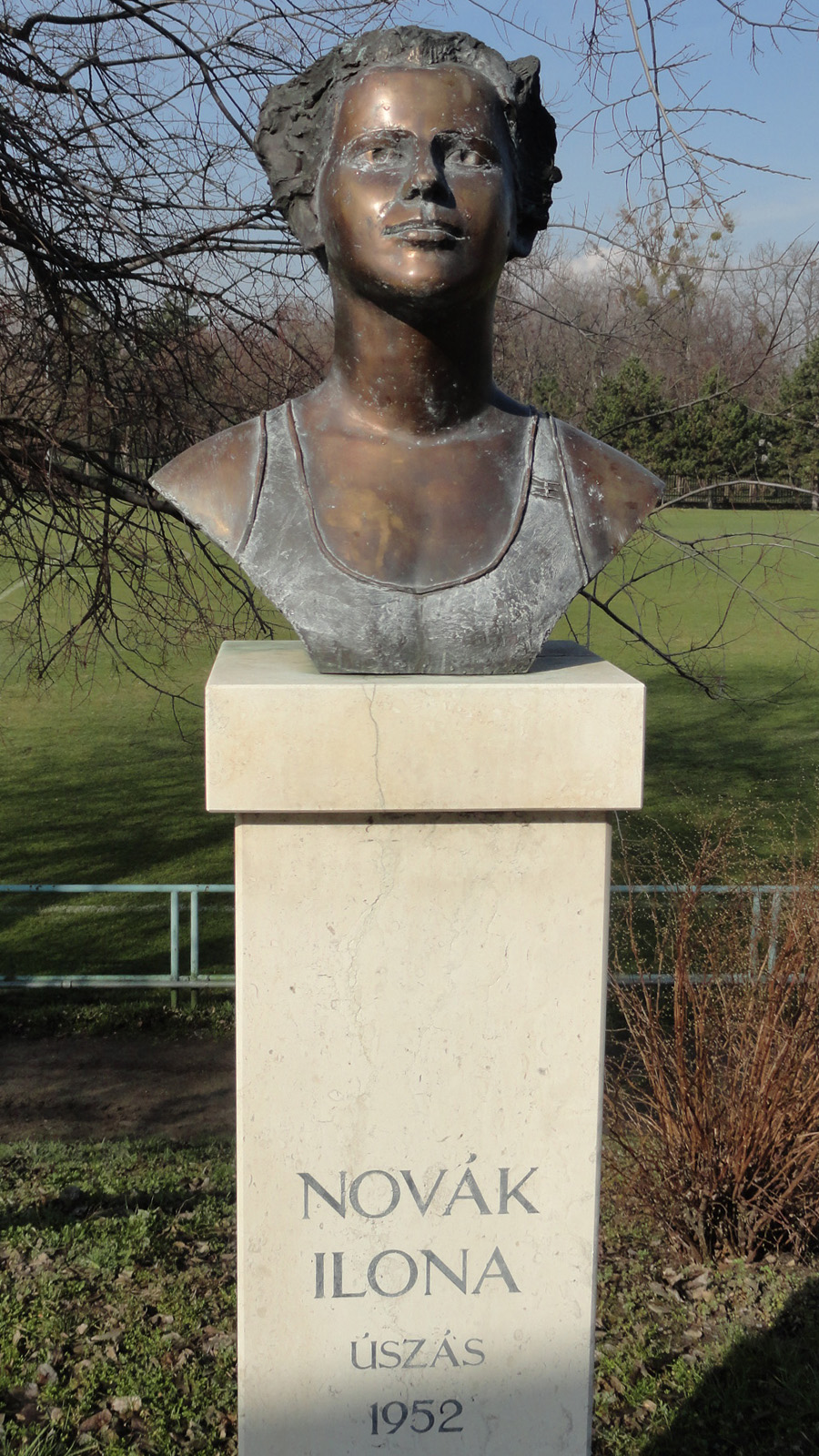
Bust of Ilona Novák

=== January–June ===
- 8 January – Antal Bolvári, water polo player, Olympic champion (b. 1932).
- 12 January – Béla Zsitnik, rower, Olympic bronze medalist (b. 1924).
- 23 January – Anthony de Jasay, economist and philosopher (b. 1925).
- 31 January – Kálmán Ihász, footballer (b. 1941).
- 2 March – János Koós, singer, parodist and actor (b. 1937).
- 14 March – Ilona Novák, swimmer, Olympic champion (b. 1925).
- 16 June – Erzsébet Gulyás-Köteles, gymnast, Olympic silver medalist and champion (b. 1924)

=== July–December ===
- 3 October – Márta Balogh, Hungarian handball player (Budapesti Spartacus SC, national team), world champion (1965) (b. 1943)
- 10 November – István Szívós, Hall of Fame water polo player and Olympic champion (1976) (b. 1948)
- 9 December – Imre Varga, sculptor and painter (b. 1923)
- 21 December – Krisztián Zahorecz, footballer (Kaposvári Rákóczi, Szolnoki MÁV, Bajai LSE) (b. 1975)
- 28 December – Erzsébet Szőnyi, Hungarian composer and music pedagogue, vice-president of the International Society for Music Education (1970–1974) (b. 1924)

== See also ==
- 2019 European Parliament election
- List of Hungarian films since 1990
