= Hungarian Astronautical Society =

Hungarian Astronautical Society abbreviated as MANT (Magyar Asztronautikai Társaság), is a non-profit organization focusing on educational and informative activities on space science, founded in 1986.
The association considers itself a successor of the Astronautical Committee of the association called Scientific Lyceum (Hun. abbr.: TIT), founded in 1956; and the Central Astronautical Section of the Federation of Technological and Sciences Associations (Hun. abbr.: MTESZ).
Members of the society are space researchers, other professionals concerned in space-related fields and others interested in the interdisciplinary and state-of-the-art uses of outer space.

== Aims ==
The main aims of the society are:

- to recruit people for space research and engineering;
- to use space research and applications to educate about STEM fields like physics, astronomy, biology, studies on (space and flight) medicine, flight technology, meteorology and about other fields related like (space) law, sociology, psychology;
- to develop the independent and team-working skills and creativity of students by organizing youth competitions, group competitions and summer space camps;
- to publicize space research and everyday applications of space not only in public events but also through media relations;
- to keep contact with Hungarian space researchers and engineers working abroad;
- to keep the memory of the great Hungarian pioneers of astronautics;
- to act for Hungary in the International Astronautical Federation (IAF) (member since 1959) and in the International Academy of Astronautics (IAA); representing Hungary at the annual International Astronautical Congress as the only participating Hungarian organization;
- to improve international connections which is even more important since Hungary has become a Member State of the European Space Agency (ESA).

== Regular events ==
Main regular events of the society:

- Hungarian Summer Space Camp (since 1994)
- Student Competition (since 1992)
- The Way to Space! Space contest for Hungarian-speaking high-school students
- Hungarian Space Academy (since 2015)
- Space Academy Club (since 2014, in February, April, September, November)
- Space Research Day (every fall)
- Hungarian Space Research Forum (biennial, odd years)
- H-SPACE Conference (international conference in English since 2015, biennial, even years)

== Publications ==
- Hungarian Space Studies Annuary, since 1961 HU ISSN 1788-7771
- English-Hungarian Space Dictionary, in cooperation with International Academy of Astronautics (IAA) as contribution to the IAA Multilingual Space Dictionary
- "Science is Born" (Tudomány születik) – Book of Interviews with Creators of Hungarian Space Studies, ISBN 978-963-7367-05-2
- "Expanding Borders" (Táguló határok) – Book of Interviews with Hungarian Space Researchers of the '70s and '80s, ISBN 978-963-7367-09-0
- "Our Space Campers" (Űrtáborosaink) - Book of Interviews with 12 former participants of the Hungarian Space Camp ISBN 978-963-7367-21-2

== Hungarian Space Camp ==
=== History ===
The camp was founded by Aunt Magdi, the "Space Granny", in 1994. Her intent was to introduce space research and astronautics to the youth. That time the program of the camp consisted mostly of lectures presented by the best-known Hungarian scientists in the field. Later the camp had a younger leadership, leading to a shift to more active and creative programs. From 2010 the duration of the camp is one week, from Sunday to Saturday. The participants are students between the age of 13 and 18, all interested in sciences and space topics. We are proud of the fact that the ratio of the girls among the participants is approaching 50%. About quarter of the students return next year and every fifth student becomes a regular camper. Some acknowledged space researchers started their "space career" in the Space Camp, like two of the secretaries general and several Members of Board.

=== Locations ===
1994 – Kecskemét, 1995 – Eger, 1996 – Veszprém, 1997 – Veszprém, 1998 – Győr, 1999 – Kecskemét, 2000 – Sopron, 2001 – Debrecen, 2002 – Székesfehérvár, 2003 – Budapest, 2004 – Kiskunhalas, 2005 – Gyulaháza, 2006 – Szentlélek, 2007 – Hollóstető, 2008 – Szentlélek, 2010 – Gyomaendrőd, 2011 – Sátoraljaújhely, 2012 – Kecskemét, 2013 – Alsómocsolád, 2014 – Felsőtárkány, 2015 – Sopron, 2016 – Debrecen, 2017 – Bakonybél, 2018 - Zalaegerszeg, 2019 - Sátoraljaújhely, 2020 - virtual (3-day online event), 2021 - virtual (3-day online event), 2022 - Székesfehérvár (planned)

=== Student competition ===
MANT organizes a competition for primary and secondary school students every year. The topics announced in around October are always different, but focus on a current aspect of space research and exploration.

=== Lectures and activities ===
In the camp space researchers and astronautical experts give lectures. Topics cover a wide range, from the basics of astronomy through problems of space debris to deciding the dilemma if Pluto is a planet or not. Other activities include several practical exercises make the camp exciting, e.g. water rocketry, underwater assembly, creating stereo pictures, astronomical observation, excursions, bathing, etc. There is a main topic every year which meets the topic of the Student Competition.

=== Mentor Program ===
Since 2015 private individuals and companies are invited to co-finance the Hungarian Space Camp as Mentors. MANT welcomes financial support of participation of needy students from Hungary and from the Hungarian diaspora in the surrounding countries. In the past years about one fifth of the participants was able to join the Camp by favor of a Mentor.

=== Student competition ===
MANT yearly announces a Student Competition for primary and secondary school students, since 1992. The topics announced around October are always different, but focus on a current aspect of space research and exploration. The topic of the Student Competition is going to be the main topic of the Space Camp of that year. E.g. title of the Competition was "Civilians in Space" in 2014, "Beyond Mars" in 2015 and "Cleaning in Space" in 2017.
Categories: writing essay; drawing; preparing project plan; creating video, website, Facebook page or blog.
Small teams of two or three students are also welcome. Applications are evaluated in two age classes: age between 11–14 and 15–18. The competition is open for visually impaired students as well. Their works are evaluated separately.
Prizes include participation in the Space Camp for free or for a reduced fee; science books and magazines; a visit to a selected space research institute or company; free one-year membership in the society.

== Other activities ==
=== Space Academy ===
Hungarian Astronautical Society in collaboration with the international Space Generation Advisory Council initiated a yearly event called Space Academy in 2015 for university students and young professionals between ages 18 and 35. It is a four-day workshop in August where the participants outline a solution for a given task or problem together.

- 2015: Voice of Youth – Which Way Now in the European Space Agency?
- 2016: Design Experiment to the International Space Station!

=== Space Academy Club ===
Space Academy Club is a lecture series organized by the Hungarian Astronautical Society and the Hungarian organizers of Space Generation Advisory Council. It takes place usually in February, April, September and November, during university semesters. It targets primarily university students and young professionals of the age between 18 and 35. The series is connected with Space Academy in their name and their target groups.

=== Hungarian Space Studies Annuary (alias Space Brochure, Hun: Űrtan évkönyv) ===
MANT has been publishing its Astronautical Brochure since 1961, which entails the recent activities of MANT and summarizes significant affairs in space research. Hungarian researchers working in space research present their latest results in the brochure.

=== Space Research Day ===
Space Research Day is organized yearly. It joins the international World Space Week in October. It usually takes place at one of the universities of Budapest, or at the Hungarian Academy of Sciences. The program consists of lectures on actual space activities and space related results and exchange of views. There are blocks for professionals, interested amateurs and students.

=== Hungarian Space Research Forum (Ionosphere and Magnetosphere Physics Seminar) ===
Hungarian Space Research Forum is a traditional biennial conference of researchers of the field, to be held for the 30th time in 2017. Its former title and now subtitle Ionosphere and Magnetosphere Physical Seminar expresses its original specialty which gained a broader horizon in the past decades. Hungarian physicists, geophysicists, astronomers, meteorologists etc. take part in this seminar by presenting their latest researches through lectures and posters.

=== School Day ===
MANT is willing to provide lectures for schools in various fields related to space activities titled School Day.

=== Radio Connection between Students and Charles Simonyi on board of ISS [2007] ===
Dr. Charles Simonyi, the first repeat space tourist launched on April 7, 2007 (GMT), on board Soyuz TMA-10 to the International Space Station and returned on April 21, 2007, on his first space flight. The Hungarian-born Simonyi is a licensed amateur radio operator (KE7KDP) and he contacted students of Puskás Tivadar Távközlési Technikum (Puskás Tivadar Telecommunications Polytechnic, Budapest) on April 13. This occasion of radio contact was organized in collaboration with MANT.

== Structure ==
This structure is used since 2009 (as of April 2020):

- All-time honorary president: Prof. Dr. Almár, Iván
- President
- Vice presidents
- Secretary general
- Deputies to secretary general
- Administrative committee
- Presidential Board
- Audit Committee

=== Honorary members ===
- Almár, Iván
- Apáthy, István
- Bán, András
- Farkas, Bertalan
- Horváth, András
- Pap, László
- Simonyi, Charles
- Solymosi, János
- Szabó, József
- Szalai, Sándor
- Abonyi, Ivánné (deceased)
- Bencze Pál (deceased)
- Detrekői Ákos (deceased)
- Gál Gyula (deceased)
- Ponori Thewrewk Aurél (deceased)
- Somogyi Antal (deceased)

=== Some well-known members of MANT (present or past) ===
- Almár, Iván astronomer
- Detrekői, Ákos geodesist
- Farkas, Bertalan astronaut
- Fonó, Albert engineer, inventor
- Gál, Gyula professor of space law
- Kulin, György astronomer
- Magyari, Béla trained astronaut
- Ponori Thewrewk Aurél astronomer
- Simonyi, Charles "space tourist"

== See also ==
- Iván Almár, astronomer, lately working in SETI
- Bertalan Farkas, the first Hungarian flied cosmonaut
- Albert Fonó Inventor, working on turbojet and ramjet propulsion, first to patent a ramjet engine in 1928
- György Kulin astronomer, discovered several minor planets
- Béla Magyari, Colonel of the Hungarian Air Force, trained cosmonaut
