= Népszínház Street 37 =

Népszínház street 37.
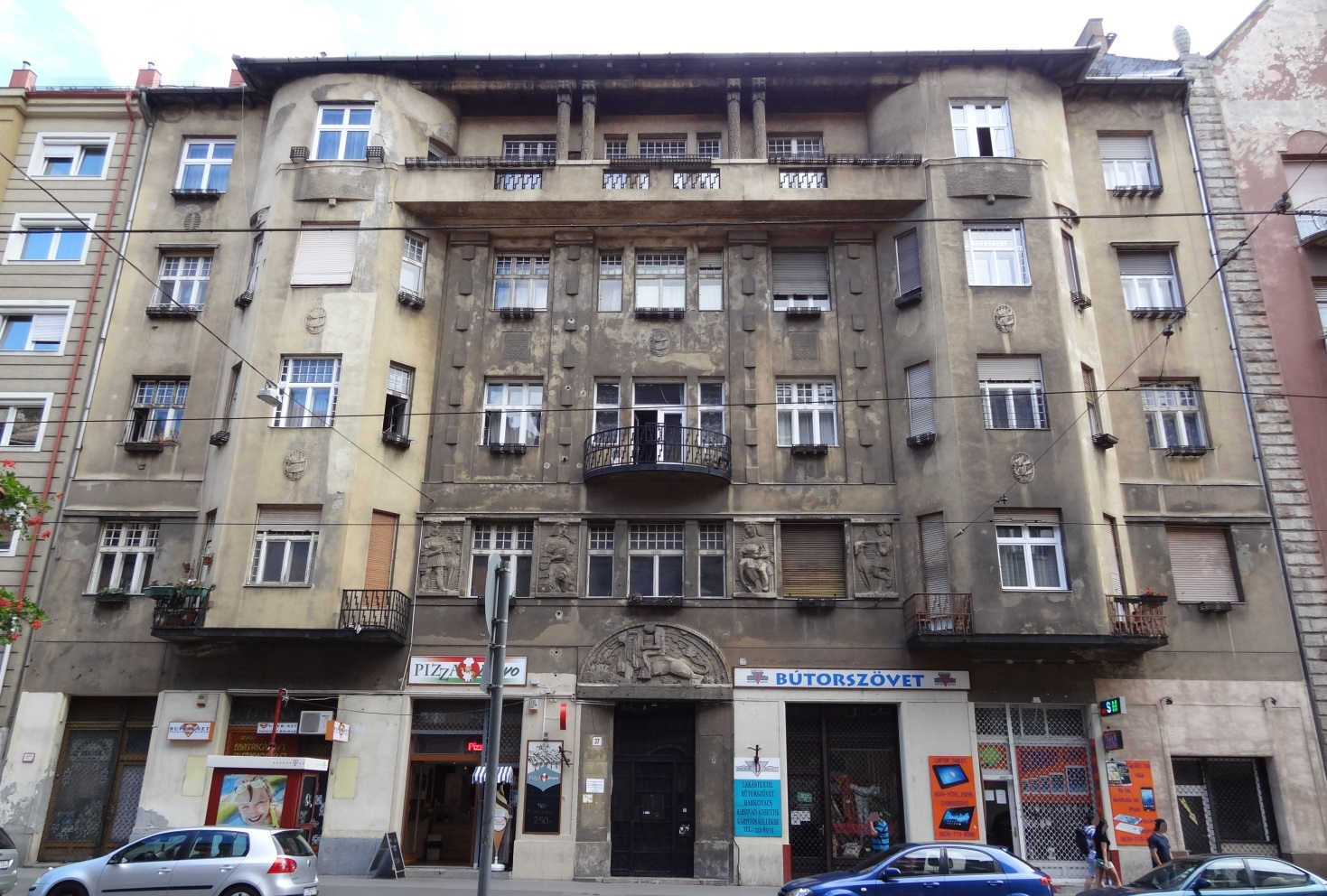
- Façade in 2017
- Interactive map of the Népszínház street 37. area
- Former names: Goldberger's House

General information
- Type: Residential House
- Architectural style: Art Déco, Art Nouveau
- Location: Budapest's VIII. District, Népszínház street 37., Budapest, Hungary
- Coordinates: 47°29′39.48″N 19°04′41.5194″E
- Construction started: 1909
- Completed: 1911

Technical details
- Structural system: Brick
- Floor count: 5
- Floor area: 779m2
- Lifts/elevators: 1

Design and construction
- Architects: Béla Löffler, Sándor (Samu) Löffler

The residential building of number 37, Népszínház street, is located in the 8th district of Budapest, Hungary, on the odd side of the street between Nagyfuvaros and Kisfuvaros street.

== Location ==
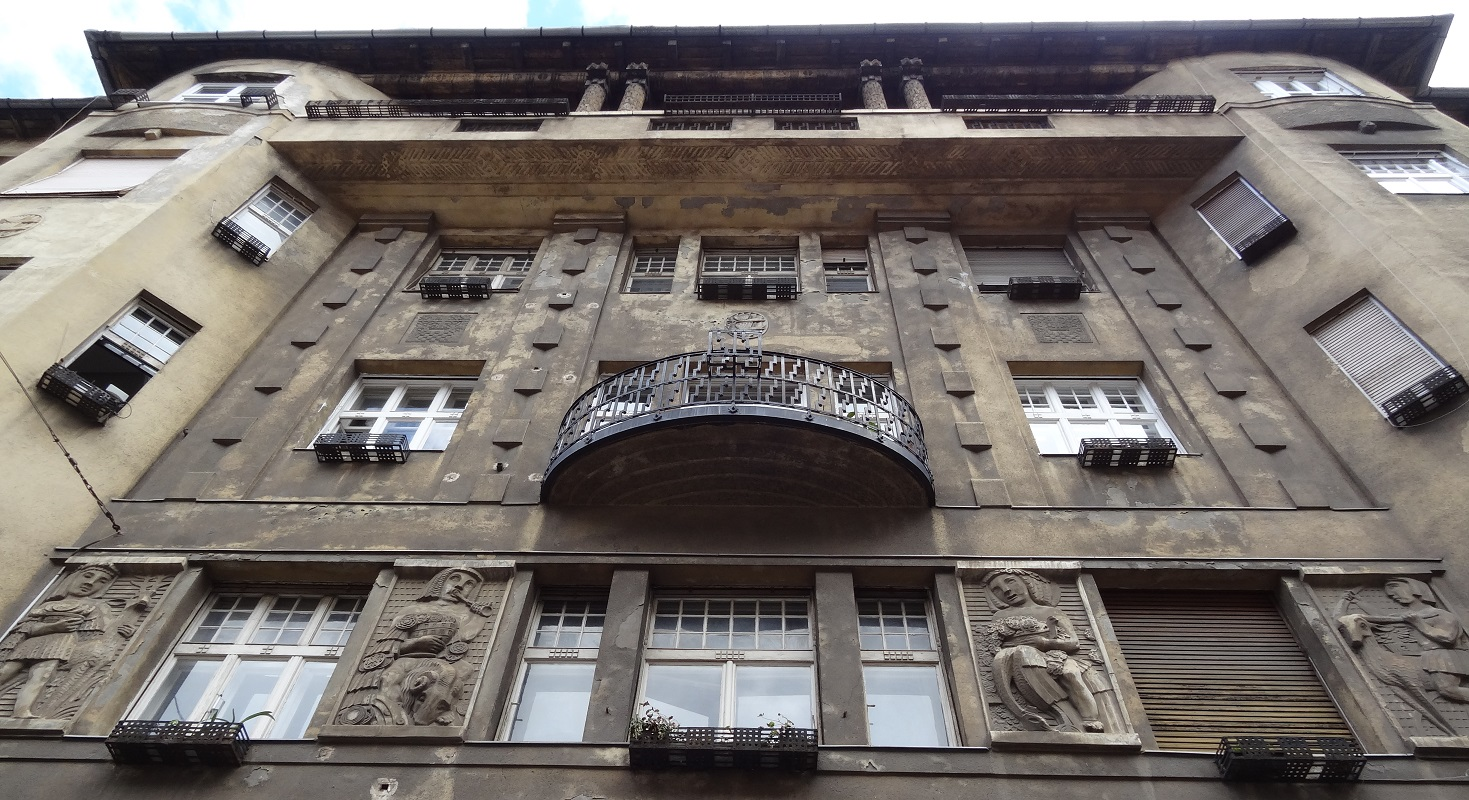
37 Népszínház street, façade in 2017 2

Its neighboring buildings are number 35 Ruchlinder house, built between 1911-1912 based on Béla Málnai and Haász's plan, and number 39 Atlas City Hotel, owned by Mellow Mood Hotels. The building is 600 meters away from the "Blaha Lujza tér" metro line 2 station and tram lines 4 and 6, 150 meters away from the "II. János Pál pápa tér" station of metro line 4, and 100 meters away from the stops of tram lines 28, 28A, 37, 37A and 62 as well as from the stops of bus lines 99 and 217E.

== History ==
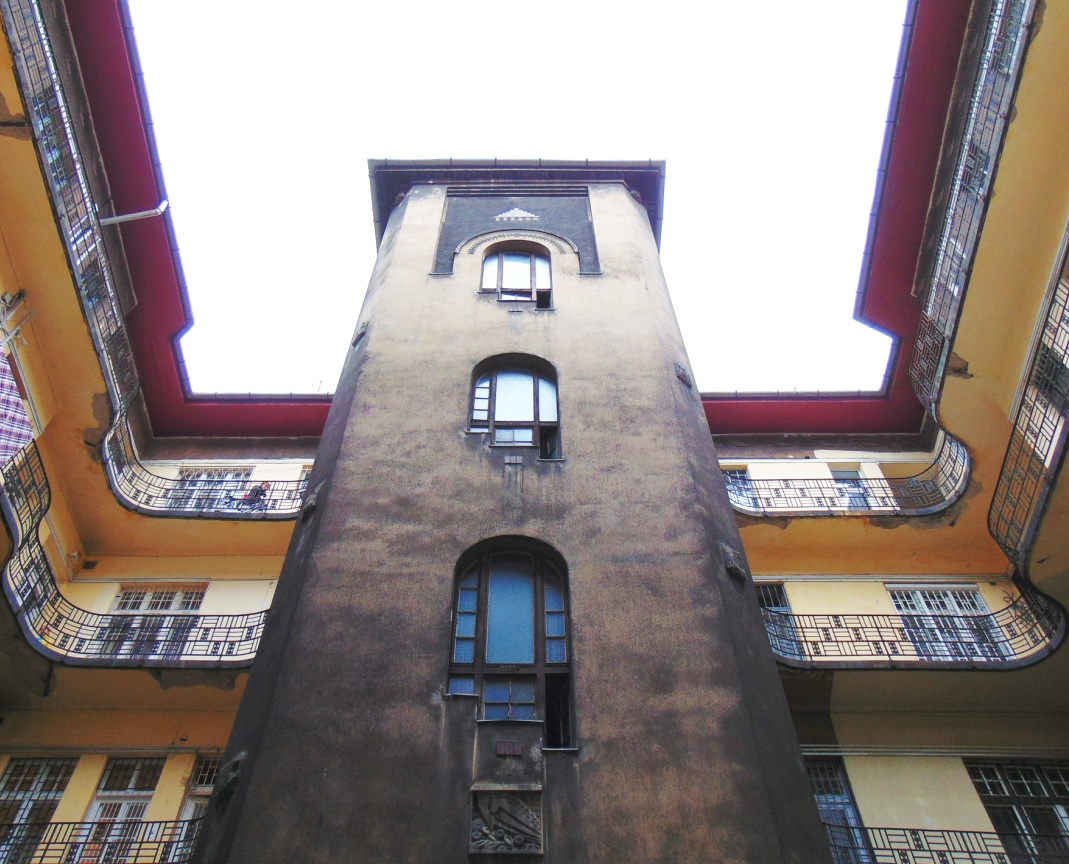
37 Népszínház street, court in 2017

The building was built between 1909 and 1911, with signs of Art Nouveau and Art Deco, on the behalf of Ármin Goldberger and his wife based on the plans of Béla Löffler and Sándor Löffler. The Löffler brothers, Sándor "Samu" Löffler (1877, Budapest – 1962, Melbourne) and Béla Löffler (1880, Budapest – the end of the 1930s, probably Jerusalem), were architects in the turn of the century, in the early modernist era.

In 1906, they opened an architectural office in Budapest and with many of their works contributed to Budapest's cultural history and its cityscape, e.g.: 37 Népszínház Street, Magda Udvar in Mátyás tér 4. Their most famous work is the plan of the orthodox Synagogue of Kazincy Street, finished in 1913, with which they gained acknowledgement and publicity. The Löffler brothers became sought-after and successful architects of Budapest.

The building was a so-called "Yellow-star house". The yellow-star houses were buildings in Budapest, which were appointed as residence for Jews, under the regulation 1944-IX/147.501-514 issued on 16 June 1944. The origin of the name is that under the regulation the entrance of the buildings had to be marked with the Star of David. Also in accordance with this regulation the Jews were obligated to wear yellow-stars as well.

The picture "37 Népszínház Street – first façade plan 1909" shows the first draft made by the architects, which was rejected. It's not so "common", but on several occasions the investor did not like the first draft and requested a completely new façade from the architects.

== Pictures from 1911 ==
37 Népszínház street – street side 1 – contemporary state	37 Népszínház street – street side 2 – contemporary state	37 Népszínház street – balcony – contemporary state	37 Népszínház street – part of the façade – contemporary state
37 Népszínház street – ornamentation above the entrance – contemporary state	37 Népszínház street – ornamentation next to the window 1 – contemporary state	37 Népszínház street – ornamentation next to the window 2 – contemporary state	37 Népszínház Street – first façade plan 1909

== Pictures from 2017 ==
37 Népszínház Street – forged iron cat banister ornament in 2017	37 Népszínház Street – forged iron raven banister ornament in 2017	37 Népszínház Street – forged iron banister ornament in 2017	37 Népszínház Street – swallows on the façade in 2017
37 Népszínház street – balcony in 2017	37 Népszínház street – ornamentation above the entrance in 2017	37 Népszínház street – ornamentation next to the window 1 in 2017	37 Népszínház street – ornamentation next to the window 2 in 2017
