= Elza Brandeisz =

Hungarian dancer, teacher, and war heroine (1907–2018)

- Brandeisz holding a letter from George Soros for her 100th birthday
- Born: Erzsébet Brandeisz; 18 September 1907; Ruszt, Austria-Hungary (present-day Rust, Austria)
- Died: 6 January 2018 (aged 110 years, 110 days); Sopron, Hungary
- Occupations: Teacher, dancer
- Awards: Righteous Among the Nations

Erzsébet "Elza" Brandeisz (18 September 1907 – 6 January 2018) was a Hungarian dancer, teacher, and supercentenarian. She was considered a pioneer of expressionist dance in Hungary. During World War II, she hid several Jews in her family's summer home in Balatonalmádi, including the 14-year-old George Soros. In 1995 she was recognized by Yad Vashem as a Righteous Among the Nations.

== Early life ==
Brandeisz was born in Ruszt, Austria-Hungary (present-day Rust, Burgenland in Austria) on 18 September 1907. She grew up in Budapest, Hungary, in a German family which belonged to the Lutheran church. As a child, she witnessed the coronation of Charles IV of Hungary in Budapest.

Between 1923 and 1928, she studied dance at the school of Lili Kállai. In the 1930s, she studied in Vienna and in Dresden under Mary Wigman.

== Career ==
Brandeisz was a dancer and later a state-licensed teacher in a private school for modern dance run by Béláné Lajtai, a Jewish woman. Brandeisz was considered "one of the pioneers of expressionist dance in Hungary". Dance competitions still call a difficult, spinaround movement that she taught the "Brandeisz Jump".

During World War II, to avoid takeover by German Nazis, Brandeisz registered Lajtai's school in her name. When Lajtai was forcibly relocated to a yellow-star house, Brandeisz brought her food and helped her obtain a letter of protection from the Portuguese embassy. Brandeisz also hid Bözsi Soros and her 14-year-old son, György, in her family's summer house in Balatonalmádi. After emigrating to America, György changed his name to George Soros. The Soros family shared the one-room house with Brandeisz's elderly father, mother, and sister.

In the postwar era, dance was viewed negatively by the new communist government and Brandeisz was banned from performing in 1948. She began teaching gymnastics and sports in Balatonalmádi.

== Later life ==
In 1963, Brandeisz retired and became a museum guide in the Storno House in Sopron, where she worked until 1978. She refused to be supported by George Soros, but she was supported by nurses on his initiative. In 1995, she was honored by Yad Vashem as Righteous Among the Nations.

In her last years she lived in seclusion in Sopron. At the time of her death on 6 January 2018, Brandeisz was the oldest resident of the city, aged 110.
