= Pál Fábry =

Hungarian politician (1919–2018)

Member of the National Assembly
- In office 24 January 1947 – 11 February 1947

Personal details
- Born: 19 June 1919 Budapest, Hungarian Soviet Republic
- Died: 8 August 2018 (aged 99) New Orleans, Louisiana, U.S.
- Party: FKgP
- Education: Pázmány Péter Catholic University
- Occupation: Politician; Businessman; Diplomat

Paul Andrew Fabry (born Fábry, Pál András) (19 June 1919 – 8 August 2018) was a Hungarian-American politician, diplomat, businessman. Fabry was best known for his efforts as a founder of the World Trade Centers Association. Fabry, along with his business associates Tadayoshi Yamada and Guy F. Tozzoli, fostered the foundation of the World Trade Centers Association in 1968, which led to the development and operation of World Trade Centers worldwide along with the building of the World Trade Center in New York. He was also the founder of the Hungarian Pulitzer Memorial Award.

== Biography ==
=== In Hungary ===
He was born in Budapest to Andrew Fábry, a General and high ranking judge, and Ilona Gombos, an artist and painter, after the collapse of the Austro-Hungarian Empire at the time of the Hungarian Soviet Republic. In 1937, he graduated from the Gödöllő Premonstratensian Grammar School. In 1942, he obtained a doctorate in political science from the Pázmány Péter Catholic University. In 1944 he was a reserve officer, entered the Independent Smallholders' Party and participated in the anti-Nazi resistance movement. After the war, he was secretary to the Ministry of Foreign Affairs, and on 4 November 1945, he was elected as a substitute in the Grand-Budapest constituency. From November 15, 1945, he was the head of the Cabinet Office of the Prime Minister under Zoltán Tildy, and subsequently the Deputy Head of the Presidential Office of the Republic. He was invited to the National Assembly on 24 January 1947, but resigned on 11 February because he was appointed secretary of the Hungarian Embassy in Ankara.

=== Emigration ===
On June 14, 1947, following the violent resignation of Prime Minister Ferenc Nagy, he left his position as a political emigrant for English intelligence. In 1949 he settled down in the United States. Between 1950 and 1953 he was the head of the Hungarian office of the Radio Free Europe in New York, and until 1962 he was a propaganda consultant at Du Pont in Wilmington, Delaware. He established the World Trade Centers Association, until 1989 he was the CEO of the New Orleans World Trade Center. Between 1982 and 1992 he was an honorary consul of Belgium in the southern states of the USA. In 1989, he founded the Pulitzer Memorial Award for which he was awarded a state prize in 2009.
