= István Komáromi =

Hungarian agronomist and politician

Member of the National Assembly
- In office 28 June 1994 – 17 June 1998

Personal details
- Born: 2 December 1943 Kolozsvár, Hungary (today: Cluj-Napoca, Romania)
- Died: 7 January 2016 (aged 72) Kunszentmiklós, Hungary
- Party: MSZMP (1975–1988); MSZP (1992–2016)
- Profession: agronomist, politician

István Komáromi (2 December 1943 – 7 January 2016) was a Hungarian agronomist and politician, who was a Member of Parliament (MP) for Kunszentmiklós (Bács-Kiskun County Constituency IV) between 1994 and 1998.

== Biography ==
He was born into a wealthy Calvinist merchant family in Kolozsvár, then part of the Kingdom of Hungary (today Cluj-Napoca, Romania). He had also Székely roots on maternal side. After the World War II, when Cluj returned to Romania in accordance with the Paris Peace Treaties, the family moved to Hungary. There his father, László Komáromi was arrested on charges of conspiracy against the state in 1949. István Komáromi finished his elementary and secondary studies in Kunszentmiklós, then studied at the Agricultural Technical Advanced School in Kiskunhalas between 1964 and 1966. He received agricultural engineer degree at the University of Agricultural Sciences in Keszthely (today belonged to the University of Pannonia) in 1970. Until 1990, he worked for several collective farms in Dunavecse, Kunszentmiklós and Soltvadkert. In 1982 and 1985, he received the honor of Excellent Worker of Agriculture.

Komáromi joined the Communist ruling Hungarian Socialist Workers' Party (MSZMP) in 1975. During the democratic transition process in Hungary, he left the party in 1988 and did not join immediately the newly formed Hungarian Socialist Party (MSZP), legal successor of the MSZMP. He ran as a non-partisan candidate in Kunszentmiklós during the 1990 local elections and was elected to the town's representative body. Following that he was appointed deputy mayor of Kunszentmiklós. In 1993, already as a member of the MSZP, he run as a candidate in the parliamentary by-election in Kunszentmiklós, but defeated by Tamás Gábor Nagy (ASZ) and came to the second place.

A year later, he was elected MP during the 1994 parliamentary election, representing Kunszentmiklós between 1994 and 1998. He was a member of the Committee on Agriculture during that time. In the 1994 local elections, he was re-elected to the representative body of Kunszentmiklós again. He retired from politics in 1998 due to his wife, Mária Szappanos' poor health (they married in 1975 and they had a son, István, Jr.). Komáromi died on 7 January 2016, only six days after his wife's death.
