= Erno Polgar =

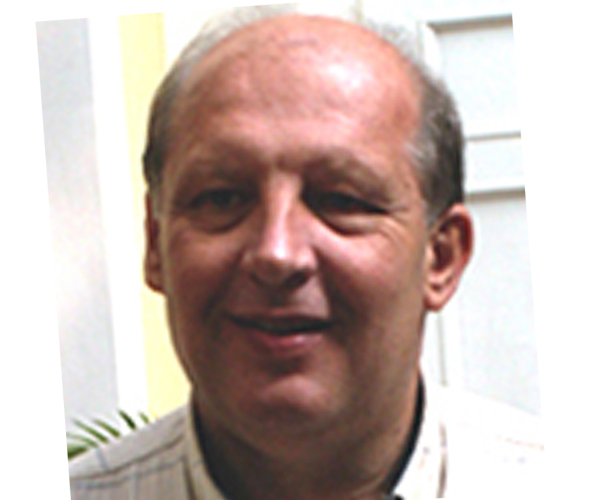
Erno Polgar

Ernő Polgár (born Ernö Csupity; 27 January 1954 in Bácsalmás – 28 October 2018 in Borneo) was a Radnoti Prize and Nagy Lajos Prize-winning author. In 2007 he was awarded one of the highest Hungarian rewards: the Knight's Cross of the Order of the Republic of Hungary. He was nominated for Nobel Prize in Literature in 2017 for the year of 2018. He was a world literary rank Hungarian-European author, editor, littérateur and dramaturgist. Since 2018 he had been living in Borneo Island, Brunei Kingdom, spending time in his "writing house".

== Life ==
He attended the secondary grammar school Janos Hunyadi and did his final exams there in 1972. He worked as a librarian and graduated at the University of Theatre and Film Arts as a dramaturgist. Between 1972 and 1976 he worked as a librarian in the National Széchényi Library then became an editor for the Hungarian Radio Corporation. From 1979 he worked as a dramaturgist for the Madach Theatre then between 1997 and 1998 worked as Head of Registrars Department at the University of Theatre and Film Arts.

== Literary career ==
Ernő Polgár is a well-known writer. He received the Radnóti Anti-Racism Award 2014

The readers can find the different manifestations of the anti-Semitism in his works This sentence makes it sound like his writing is anti-semitic, which doesn't make sense given the preceding sentence noting that he won an award for not being racist. Ernő Polgar's philosophy is, “the measure of the civilization are the respect for ancestors and humanism.” He started writing as a child for the journal The People of Petofi. His sociography titled “The Lodgers” was published in the magazine Budapest in 1975. He won the scholarship of the Hungarian Academy of Sciences in 1981, the Soros Fellowship in 1983 and the Scholarship of Pro Cultura Hungariae in 1998 He has been a free-lance writer since 1998. Between 2000 and 2003 he was the head of Blue Shop Online Gallery and Digital Publisher and chairman of the supervisory board of www.hun-info.hu online media agency. From 2002 he was the secretary and later chairman of the Prose Section of the Hungarian Writers' Union.

Since 2004 he has been the member of the Society of Belletrists, managing literary programs: “Nights in Lipotvaros” (Club Gallery, Ujlipotvaros), “Encounters” and “Frankel Nights”. Member of the Hungarian P.E.N. Club and the National Association of Hungarian Artists (MAOE), chairman of the Association of Humanist Writers (HIT) and secretary general of the Barankovics Jewish Workshop In 2007 he won one of the highest Hungarian prizes: Magyar Köztarsasagi Erdemrend Lovagkereszt (Knight's Cross of the Order of the Republic of Hungary)

Erno Polgar in Bali

== Works ==
- 1983 (Hullámsír, Hazatérők, Ady) Davy Jones' locker, Coming home, Ady (drama) Drama “Ady” was presented by the Children's Theatre, Budapest
- 1985 (Túl az Egyenlítőn) Beyond the Equator (drama) Presented by Madach Theatre, Budapest
- 1991 (Randevú Bangkokban) Rendezvous in Bangkok, Convicted, Fire walkers (drama)
- 1992 (A sárga csillagok nyomában) In the wake of the yellow stars (sociography)
- 1994 (Isten madárkái) Birdies of God (film)
- 1994 (Légy a feleségem!) Be my wife! (short stories)
- 1994 (A Philemopn fedélzetén a világkörül) On board Philemon around the world (travelogue)
- 1994 (Lótuszvirág) Lotus (stories from the Far East)
- 1997 (A sárga csillagok nyomában) In the wake of the yellow stars (Ghetto in the Hungarian Meridian. Second extended edition
- 1997 (Egy asszony második élete) The second life of a woman (non-fiction)
- 1999 (Szerelmek) Love stories (novel)
- 2000 (A Szent István parki fák) The trees in St Stephen's Park (short story)
- 2000 (Színészek és színésznők bűvöletében) Under the spell of actors and actresses
- 2001 (Civilizációk nyomában) In the wake of civilizations (cultural history)
- 2001 (Az iszlám világ titkai) The secrets of the Islamic world (CD-ROM)
- 2002 (Az istenek szigete) The isle of gods (novel)
- 2002 Under the spell of seas and continents (essay, digital edition)
- 2003 (Káma szolgája) The servant of Kama (novel)
- 2004 (Halálos csók) Lethal kiss (short stories)

Erno Polgar in India

=== Works published in lifework edition ===
- 2005 (Hogyan lettem anya) How I became a mother (non-fiction)
- 2005 (A kultúrák eredete) The origin of cultures and their archetypes. Introduction to the world of myths and symbols (cultural history)
- 2006 (Kleopátra vitorlása) The sailing boat of Cleopatra. Gastronomic tours. (cultural history)
- 2006 (Egy asszony második élete) The second life of a woman (non-fiction, 4th edition)
- 2007 (Nomádok vágtája) Gallop of the nomads (short stories)
- 2007 (Az iszlám világ titkai) The secrets of the Islamic world (cultural history, 2nd revised edition)
- 2008 (Óceánia) Oceania (cultural history)
- 2009 (A gyertya becsukta a szemét, Mama!) Mum, the candle shut its eyes! (non-fiction)
- 2009 (India és más világok) India and other worlds (cultural history)
- 2010 (Zsidok, kotródjatok!) Jews, shove off! Exile to Babylon
- 2011 (Gasztronómiai ABC) ABC of the culinary history
- 2012 (Facebook love) Facebook of love (chat stories)
- 2012 (Száműzetés Babilonba) Exile to Babylon (Chapters from the life and traditions of the Jewish). (novel)
- 2013 (Indiai Dekameron)Decameron of India (novel)
- 2013 (Újlipótvárosi séták)Walks in Ujlipotvaros (Tracking memorial plaques). (cultural history)
- 2014 (Isten madárkái) The birdies of God (selected novels)
- 2015 (Korok-Diszletek-Emberek) Times-Sceneries-People (Cultural history)

Erno Polgar doing a dedication

=== Works published online ===
- 2010 (Újlipótvárosi séták) Walks in Ujlipotvaros (cultural history)
- 2012 (Indiai dekameron) Decameron of India (online edition) (novel)
- 2012 (A XX. század, ahonnan érkeztünk) The 20th century from where we have arrived
- 2013 (Tengerek és szárazföldek nyomában) Under the spell of seas and continents (online edition) (travelogue)
- 2013 (Isten madárkái) The birdies of God (selected stories) (online edition)
- 2013 (Korok-díszletek-emberek)Eras – scenes – people. The culture of thousand years. (selected novels) (online edition)
- 2013 (Számüzetés Babilonba – Fejezetek a zsidó nép életéből és hagyományaiból)Exile to Babylon (Chapters from the life and traditions of the Jewish)
- 2014 (Holocaust – Getto a Délvidéken)Holocaust
- 2014 (Zsidó) (Jew) (Drama)
- 2014 Jenseits und Diesseits der irdische Bühne Übersetzerin: Klara Kohlhepp
- 2015 LE ORIGINI E LE IMMAGINI PRIMORDIALI DELLE CULTURE (Italian edition)
- 2015 Saloon Clotilde Translated by Anna Feuer
- 2016 Polgar Erno Written by Cserenyi Rita
- 2016 Sulle orme delle civiltà – Camminata attraverso la Valle di Neander fino

all'Internet (Traduzione di Kati Szasz) http://mek.oszk.hu/16300/16364/

- 2017 ("Itt születtem, ez a hazám!)..." : Fejezetek Bácsalmás történetéből I was born here, this is my home http://mek.oszk.hu/16400/16498/
- 2017 !A Lyukasóra tíz éve Tíz éves a Magyar Írók Egyesülete) Ten years old the Association of Hungarian Writers http://mek.oszk.hu/16900/16951/
- 2017 (Különös utazás) Tudományos-fantasztikus regény Fantastic travel (Novel) http://mek.oszk.hu/16900/16963/
- 2017 A nő Tudományos-fantasztikus regény The Woman (Novel) http://mek.oszk.hu/16900/16972/
- 2017 Amori (novel) Translated by Kati Szasz http://mek.oszk.hu/17300/17353/
