= Anna Jókai =

Hungarian author, poet and teacher

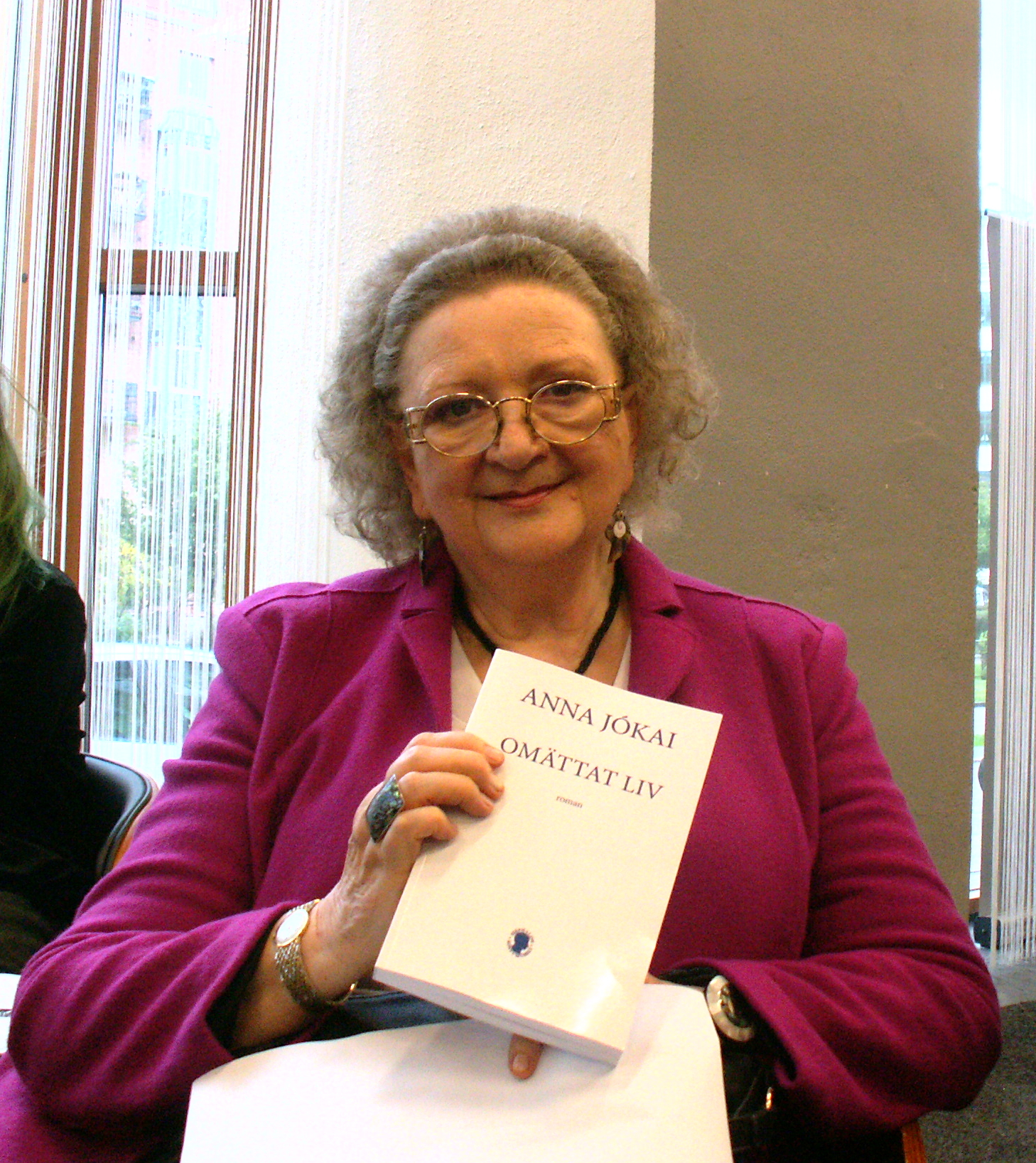
- Anna Jókai at Gothenburg Book Fair in 2015
- Born: 24 November 1932; Budapest, Hungary
- Died: 5 June 2017 (aged 84); Budapest, Hungary
- Occupations: Writer, Teacher

Anna Jókai (Hungarian: Jókai Anna) (24 November 1932 – 5 June 2017) was a Hungarian author, poet and teacher. She began her writing career in 1974 and, during the 1980s, she participated in the Hungarian liberation movement. Between 1990 and 1992, she was the chairperson of the Hungarian Writers' Union.

== Biography ==
Anna Jókai was born in Budapest, and at an early age she started to show interest in writing. However, when she was sixteen, she stopped with her early attempts at becoming an author and did not attempt it again until seventeen years later. During her school years she had different employments within accounting and teaching. During most of the 1950s, she worked as a government-supported author. In 1956, she studied at university and in 1961 she graduated with degrees in Hungarian literature and history. She worked as a junior-level teacher until 1970 in Budapest.

Between 1971 and 1974, Jókai worked as a high school teacher. Between 1968 and 1977, she wrote five books and four novels. Slowly she gained the interest from readers, and since 1974 she has been a full-time author and writer. Between 1986 and 1989, she was the chairman of the Hungarian Writers Association, and between 1990 and 1992, she was the chancellor.

In 1994 and 2014, she received the Hungarian Kossuth award.

== Bibliography ==
- Kötél nélkül, 1969
- A labda, 1971/1994
- Napok,1972/2001
- Mindhalálig, 1974
- A feladat, 1977/1996
- Szegény Sudár Anna, 1989/1999
- Ne féljetek, 1998
- Bölcsek és Pásztorok, 2006
