= Miklós Vető =

Hungarian-born French philosopher (1936–2020)

Miklós Vető (22 August 1936 – 8 January 2020) was a Hungarian-born French philosopher. A historian of German Idealism, especially Schelling, he lived in Paris. As an author, many of his works were collected by libraries.

== Biography ==
Vető was born in Budapest, and studied law at the University of Szeged. Because of his participation in the Revolution of 1956 he had to flee Hungary. As a refugee he was admitted to France in 1957. He studied philosophy first at the Sorbonne and then Oxford. He taught at Marquette and Yale Universities in the United States, the University of Abidjan in the Ivory Coast and Rennes and Poitiers Universities in France. He was made Professor Emeritus in 2005.

Vető was an external member of the Hungarian Academy of Sciences, and a member of the Catholic Academy of France and the Academy of Messina. He was awarded a Doctorate Honoris Causa by the Pázmány Péter Catholic University, Budapest and the University of Szeged. He was Honorary Professor at the Australian Catholic University, Melbourne and an officer of the National Order of the Ivory Coast. He died in Paris.

== Philosophy ==
Vető's philosophy is coordinated along three interrelated foci:

1. The history of philosophy. This is the central thread of Vető's philosophical research: as well as German Idealism (Kant, Hegel, Schelling), he has written on the thought of Alfred North Whitehead and Jean-Luc Marion.
2. The philosophy of religion, understood as the philosophical investigation of the intelligibility of Christian spirituality and theology. Vető has written on the religious thought of Simone Weil, Jonathan Edwards, Gabriel Marcel and Pierre de Bérulle.
3. A constructive metaphysics, concerned with the "enlargement" of philosophical reflection by intercourse with themes drawn from religion, art and ordinary experience.

Foci 1 and 2 have involved parallel developments through his career, whereas focus 3 has appeared central in publications since 2002.

== Publications ==
- La métaphysique religieuse de Simone Weil, Paris, 1971; 3. ed. Paris, 2014. English translation: The religious metaphysics of Simone Weil, Albany, 1994. Translations in Italian, Japanese and Hungarian.
- F. W. J. Schelling: Stuttgarter Privatvorlesungen. Critical edition, Turin, 1973, 2. edition Paris, 2009.
- Le Fondement selon Schelling, Paris, 1977, 2. ed. Paris, 2002.
- La pensée de Jonathan Edwards, Paris, 1987, 2. ed. Paris, 2007. English translation: The Thought of Jonathan Edwards, Eugene (Oregon)
- Études sur l'idéalisme allemand, Paris, 1998.
- De Kant à Schelling. Les deux voies de l'idéalisme allemand I-II. Krisis, Grenoble, 1998–2000 (German translation in preparation).
- Le Mal: Essais et Etudes , Paris, 2000.
- Fichte de l'action à l'image, Paris, 2001.
- La naissance de la volonté, Paris, 2002, also a Brazilian translation
- Philosophie et religion. Paris, 2006. Translation in Hungarian.
- Nouvelles études sur l'idéalisme allemand. Paris, 2009.
- L'élargissement de la métaphysique, Paris, 2012, English translation: The Expansion of Metaphysics. Eugene (Oregon), (in preparation).
- Explorations métaphysiques, Paris, 2012.
- Gabriel Marcel, Paris, 2014.
- De Whitehead à Marion. Éclats de philosophie contemporaine, Paris, 2015.
- Pierre de Bérulle: Les thèmes majeurs de sa pensée. PARIS, 2016.
- La volonté selon Fénelon, Paris (in print).

Also over 400 other publications: articles, prefaces, book reviews.
