= Attila Miklósházy =

Most Reverend Attila Miklósházy, S.J.
- Bishop Emeritus of the Hungarian Emigrants (Worldwide)
- Church: Catholic Church
- See: Titular See of Castellum Minus

Orders
- Ordination: June 18, 1961
- Consecration: November 4, 1989

Personal details
- Born: April 5, 1931 Diósgyőr, Hungary
- Died: December 28, 2018 (aged 87) Pickering, Ontario, Canada
- Buried: St. Augustine's Seminary, Scarborough, Ontario, Canada

Attila Miklósházy S.J. (5 April 1931 – 28 December 2018) was a Hungarian-born Canadian Jesuit priest and Bishop of the Hungarian Emigrants from 1989 to 2006.

In 1989 Pope John Paul II appointed Miklósházy as bishop responsible for Hungarian emigrants, a position he held until his retirement in 2006.
