= János György Szilágyi =

Hungarian historian

János György Szilágyi (16 July 1918 – 7 January 2016) was a Hungarian historian who was a specialist in ancient drama and Greek art. He was born in Budapest. In 2011 he was awarded the Order of Merit of the Republic of Hungary. He died at the age of 97 in 2016.

== Selected publications ==
- Ancient art. Budapest Museum of Fine Arts, Budapest, 2003. ISBN 9789637441943
- In search of Pelasgian ancestors: The 1861 Hungarian excavations in the Apennines. Atlantisz, Budapest, 2004. ISBN 9789639165755
