= István Bethlen (born 1946) =

Hungarian economist, politician (1946–2018)

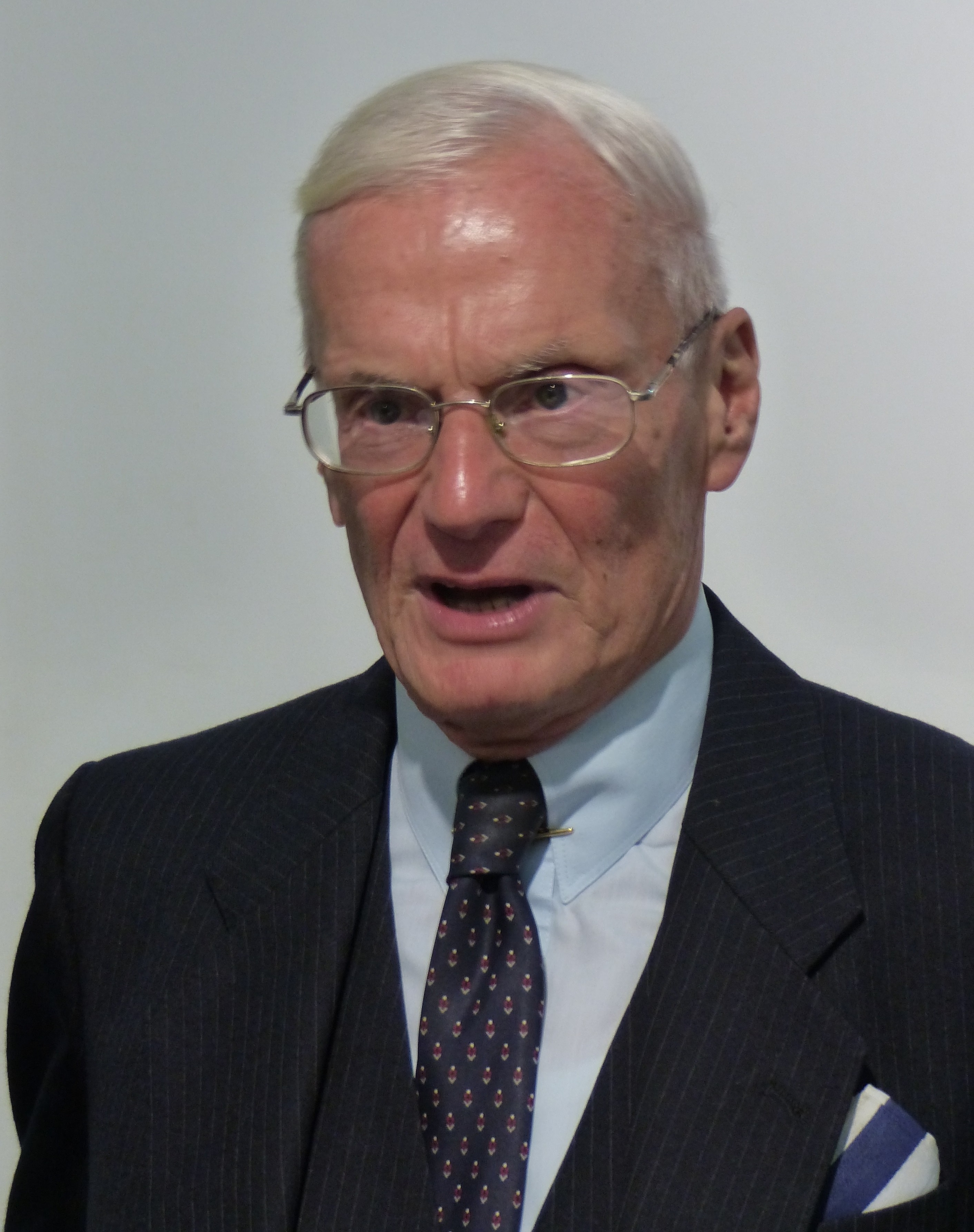
- István Bethlen in 2016

Member of the National Assembly
- In office 2 May 1990 – 27 June 1994

Personal details
- Born: 19 June 1946 Cluj, Romania
- Died: 4 September 2018 (aged 72) Budapest, Hungary
- Party: MDF
- Profession: economist, politician

István Bethlen (19 June 1946 – 4 September 2018) was a Hungarian economist and politician, member of the National Assembly (MP) from MDF Budapest Regional List between 1990 and 1994.

== Biography ==
He was born as Count István Bethlen de Bethlen (Hungarian: bethleni gróf Bethlen István) into a wealthy and influential Transylvanian family in Cluj, which was already part of the Kingdom of Romania again after World War II. He was the fourth child of Count László Bethlen and Countess Margit Teleki de Szék. Count István married Éva Vajda de Kisbag on 21 September 1991 in Budapest.

Count István immigrated to West Germany in his youth. He finished his academic studies at the University of Innsbruck, LMU Munich, and the University of Vienna. He published several economic works in English and German.

He returned to Hungary after the end of Communism in 1990. He was elected Member of Parliament from the Hungarian Democratic Forum's Budapest Regional List in the 1990 parliamentary election. He served as Deputy Chairman of the Committee on Budget, Tax and Finance from 3 May 1990 and 21 December 1990. He was also a member of the Committee on European Community Affairs from 23 June 1992 and the Committee on Human Rights, Minorities and Religious Affairs from 15 June 1993.

Bethlen served as President of the Hungarian branch of the Paneuropean Union (MPUE) from 1994 to 2012. He died on 4 September 2018, at the age of 72.
