= Anthony de Jasay =

Hungarian economist, philosopher (1925–2019)

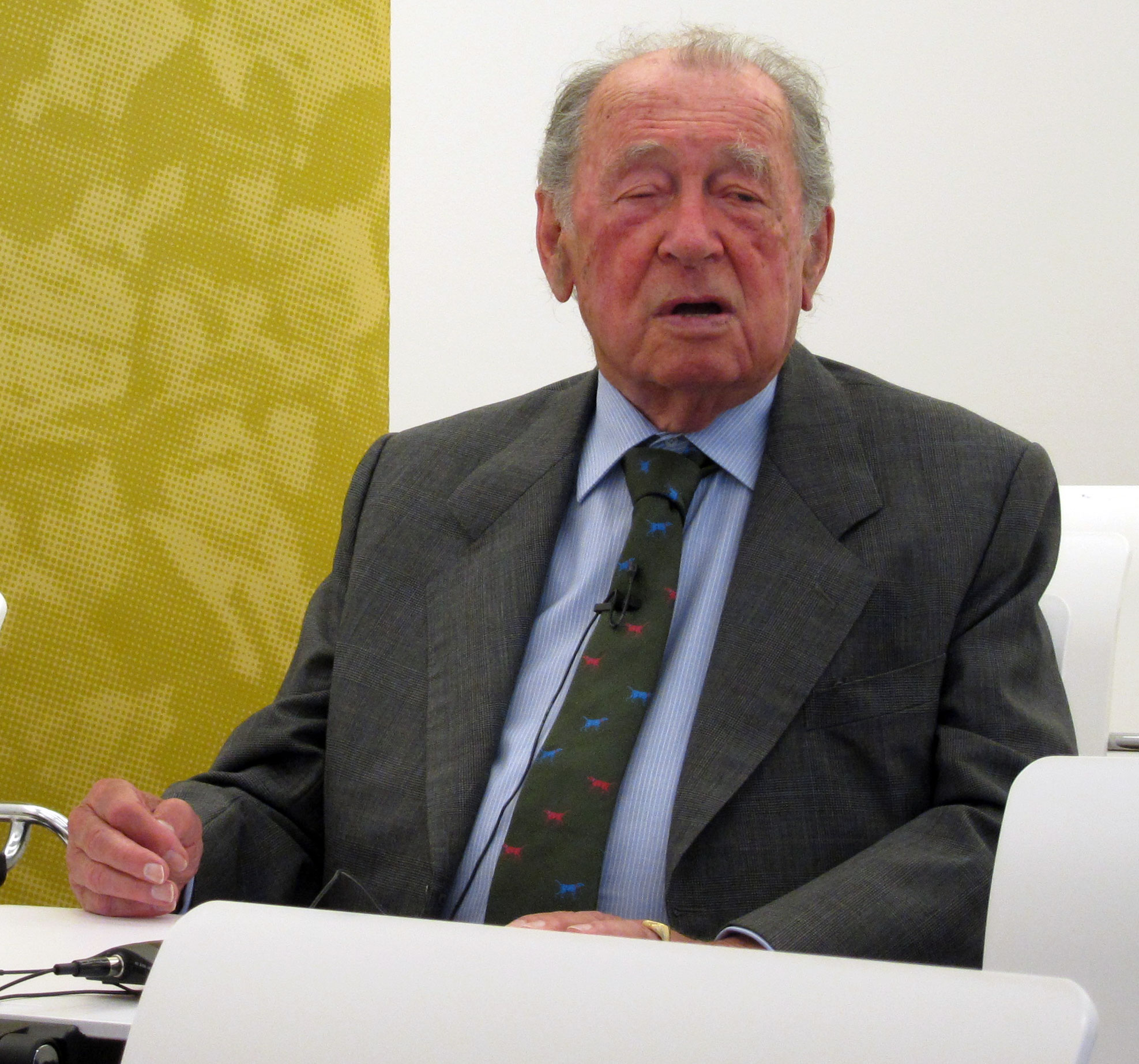
- Born: 15 October 1925; Aba, Hungary
- Died: 23 January 2019 (aged 93); France
- Education: Nuffield College, Oxford
- Occupations: Economist; Philosopher
- Website: www.dejasay.org

Anthony de Jasay (Hungarian: Jászay Antal; 15 October 1925 – 23 January 2019) was a Hungarian writer, economist, and philosopher. He studied in Székesfehérvár and Budapest, obtaining a degree in agriculture. He then worked as a freelance journalist, but emigrated from Hungary in 1948 after the Communist government nationalized his father's farm. His views have been described as liberal, sceptical of the state, and favouring strict limits on government.

He spent two years in Austria, and then emigrated to Australia, where he trained as an economist at the University of Western Australia. Moving to England, de Jasay did research at Nuffield College, Oxford until 1962. He finally settled in France and spent the rest of his career authoring articles for, among others, the Economic Journal and the Journal of Political Economy.

The confiscation of his father's farm and the Solidarność movement in Poland in the 1980s inspired de Jasay to author his first book, The State (1985).

Anthony de Jasay died in France on 23 January 2019, aged 93.

== Works ==
- de Jasay, Anthony (1985). The State. Basil Blackwell, Ltd. ISBN 0865971714.
- de Jasay, Anthony (1989). Social Contract, Free Ride: A Study of the Public-Goods Problem. Liberty Fund Inc. ISBN 0865977011.
- de Jasay, Anthony (1991). Choice, Contract, Consent: A Restatement of Liberalism. Institute of Economic Affairs. ISBN 0255362463.
- de Jasay, Anthony (1997). Against Politics: On Government, Anarchy and Order. Routledge. ISBN 0415170672.
- de Jasay, Anthony (2010). Political Economy, Concisely: Essays on Policy That Does Not Work and Markets That Do. Liberty Fund Inc. ISBN 978-0865977778.
- de Jasay, Anthony (2010). Political Philosophy, Clearly: Essays on Freedom and Fairness, Property and Equalities. Liberty Fund Inc. ISBN 978-0865977839.
- de Jasay, Anthony (2014). Economic Sense and Nonsense: Reflections from Europe, 2008–2012. Liberty Fund Inc. ISBN 978-0865978782.
- de Jasay, Anthony (2014). Social Justice and the Indian Rope Trick. Liberty Fund Inc. ISBN 978-0865978850.
