= László Marosi (writer) =

Hungarian writer

László Marosi (1936 – 22 June 2017) was a Hungarian writer. He wrote the Bucó, Szetti, Tacsi comics between 1984 and 1989, and he established the Táltos publisher. The first Bucó, Szetti, Tacsi was published in 1984. Its title was "Három kiskutya története" ("Tale of three small dogs"). The illustrator was Sándor Békési. Later János Verebics, and then József Haui were the illustrator. The last Bucó, Szetti, Tacsi comics was published in 1989. After that, he began to export wine to China. He died in 2017, after a long illness.
