= András Haán =

Hungarian basketball player (1946–2021)

Personal information
- Nationality: Hungarian
- Born: 19 June 1946; Budapest, Hungary
- Died: 5 January 2021 (aged 74); Solymár, Hungary

Sport
- Sport: Basketball

András Haán (19 June 1946 – 5 January 2021) was a Hungarian sportsman. He competed in the men's basketball tournament at the 1964 Summer Olympics in Tokyo. He also competed in the sailing at the 1976 Summer Olympics in Montreal.
