= András Gergely (historian) =

Hungarian historian (1946–2021)

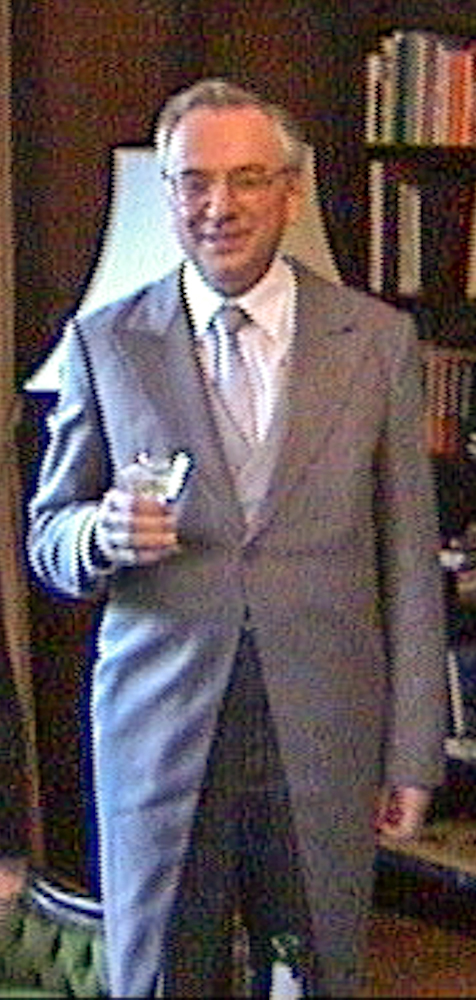
Gergely in 2002

András Gergely (23 May 1946 – 3 May 2021) was a Hungarian historian and diplomat. He was the Hungarian ambassador to the Netherlands.
