= László Iván =

Hungarian politician (1933–2020)

Member of the National Assembly
- In office 16 May 2006 – 5 May 2014

Personal details
- Born: 9 May 1933 Gönc, Hungary
- Died: 16 January 2020 (aged 86)
- Profession: psychiatrist, academic

Prof. László Iván (9 May 1933 – 16 January 2020) was a Hungarian psychiatrist, neurologist, geriatrician, academic and politician who was a member of the National Assembly (MP) from Fidesz Borsod-Abaúj-Zemplén County Regional List from 2010 to 2014. He was also Member of Parliament from Fidesz National List between 2006 and 2010.

== Career ==
Iván attended to the Cistercian Saint Emeric Secondary School from 1943 to 1951. From 1951 to 1957, he attended and then graduated with summa cum laude from the Budapest Medical Science University. His medical qualifications are the following: psychiatrist (1961); judicial psychiatric expert (1969); geriatrist (2000); candidate for medical sciences (1980); PhD (1995).

He began his career in the Clinic of Neurology and Psychiatry of Semmelweis University in 1957. He worked in the Center of Gerontology from 1982 to 1998. He worked in the Kútvölgyi Clinic of Semmelweis University. He was a university professor since 1993, head of institute from 1993 to 1998, and a lecturer and head of a specialised ambulant treatment. He was Professor Emeritus since 2003. His research themes were gerontology and process of ageing. He was founder and leader of the Elderly Academy of László Batthyány-Strattmann since 1997. He was author of numberless scientific articles, books, parts of books, popular-science lecture articles and reports. He was awarded as honorary doctor of the University of Valencia (1983); Life for Years Prize (1994); Semmelweis University's Golden Ring; Pro Sanitate Commemorative Medal (1995); Knight's Cross Order of Merit of the Republic of Hungary (2001).

He was involved in different professional associations and non-profit organizations: member of the Council of Elderly (1996-1998) and associate chairman (1998-2002); Demographic Committee of the Hungarian Academy of Sciences (MTA) (1996- ); Hungarian Association of Gerontology and the chairman of the Professional Board of Gerontology (1993-1999), chairman of the Hungarian Social Policy Association (1992- ) and numerous other Hungarian and international professional organisations. He was also a member of the European specialist medical doctors Committee (1998- ).

He participated in the activity of the Fidesz - Hungarian Civic Union's national Consultation. In the parliamentary elections held in 2006, he was elected from the party's National List. He was a member of the Committee on Youth, Social and Family Affairs since 2006. He became Member of Parliament from Fidesz Borsod-Abaúj-Zemplén County Regional List on 14 May 2010. He was appointed member of the Committee on Health. He also served as Chairman of the Subcommittee on Pension Policy since 28 June 2010.

László Iván died on 16 January 2020, at the age of 86.
