= János Halász (basketball) =

Hungarian basketball player

- Born: 15 May 1929; Szeged, Kingdom of Hungary
- Died: 30 October 2017 (aged 88); Budapest, Hungary
- Occupation: Basketball player

János Halász (15 May 1929 – 30 October 2017) was a Hungarian basketball player. He competed at the 1948 Summer Olympics.
