= Etelka Keserű =

Hungarian economist and politician (1925–2018)

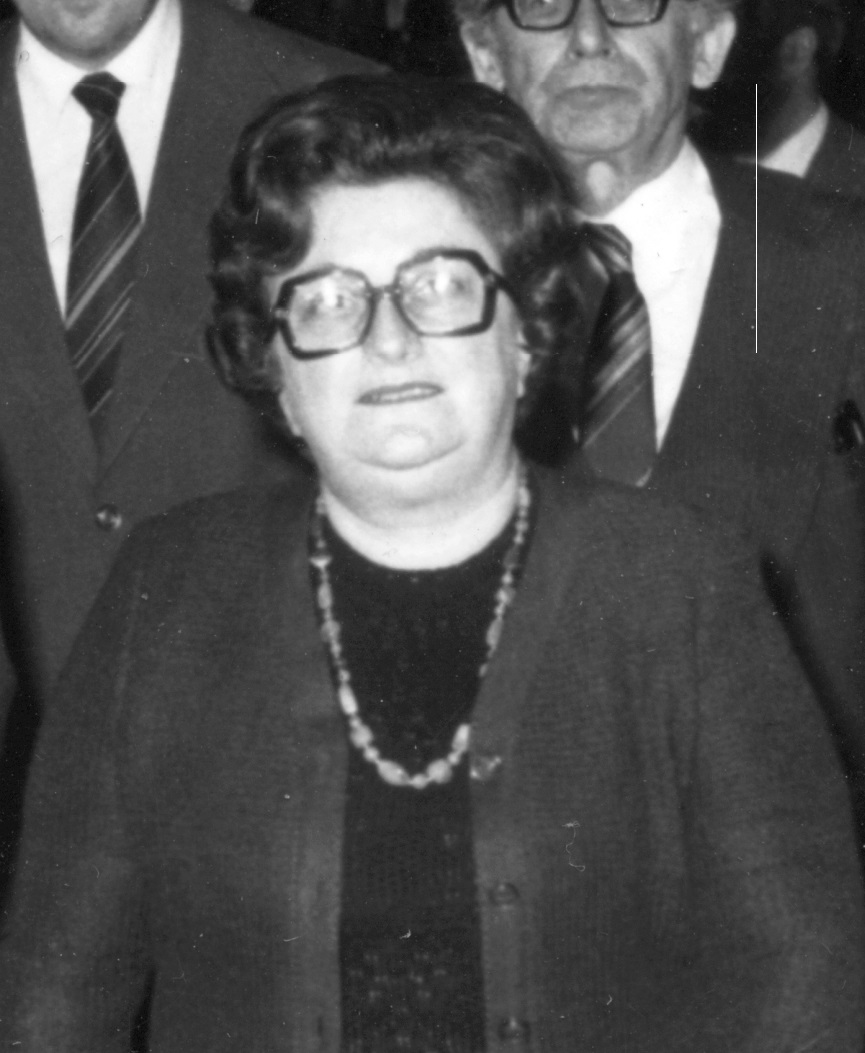
- Etelka Keserű in 1979

Minister of Light Industry
- In office 12 May 1971 – 31 December 1980
- Preceded by: Jolán Nagy
- Succeeded by: Lajos Méhes (Industry)

Personal details
- Born: 26 August 1925; Gyoma, Hungary (today part of Gyomaendrőd)
- Died: 1 April 2018 (aged 92)
- Political party: MSZMP
- Profession: economist, politician

Etelka Keserű (née Bérci; 26 August 1925 – 1 April 2018) was a Hungarian economist and politician, who served as Minister of Light Industry between 1971 and 1980.

== Career ==
She started her political and economic career in 1950. She was a member of the Hungarian Socialist Workers' Party (MSZMP). She served as Deputy Minister of Domestic Trade from 12 January 1967 to 12 May 1971. She was the last Minister of Light Industry between 12 May 1971 and 31 December 1980, when the portfolio was merged into the Ministry of Industry.

Keserű was a member of the presidium of the Hungarian Women's National Council (MNOT) from 1971 to 1990. She was also elected into the Central Committee of the Hungarian Socialist Workers' Party (MSZMP KB) in 1975, holding the position until 1985. She served as co-President of the Hungarian Chamber of Commerce (MKK) between 1981 and 1986.

She retired in 1990. She died on 1 April 2018, aged 92.

== Works ==
- Muszti, László – Keserű, Jánosné – Seres, József: Iskolai ifjúsági olvasómozgalom. Szocialista nevelés kiskönyvtára, Tankönyvkiadó, Budapest, 1952.
- Keserű, Jánosné: Belkereskedelmünk időszerű kérdései. Budapest: Magyar Szocialista Munkáspárt. 1962.
