= István Talabos =

Hungarian sports shooter (1956–2018)

Personal information
- Nationality: Hungarian
- Born: 1 June 1956; Szigethalom, Hungary
- Died: 20 October 2018 (aged 62)

Sport
- Sport: Sports shooting

István Talabos (1 June 1956 – 20 October 2018) was a Hungarian sports shooter. He competed at the 1976 Summer Olympics and the 1980 Summer Olympics.
