= Etelka Barsi-Pataky =

Hungarian politician (1941–2018)

Etelka Barsi-Pataky (15 September 1941 in Budapest – 4 February 2018) was a Hungarian politician. From 2004 to 2009, she was a Member of the European Parliament (MEP) with Fidesz, part of the European People's Party. She sat on the European Parliament's Committee on Transport and Tourism.

Barsi-Pataky was a substitute for the Committee on Industry, Research and Energy and a member of the Delegation for relations with South Africa.

== Education ==
- 1964: Budapest University of Technology, engineer's certificate
- 1980: town planning engineer's certificate

== Career ==
- 2010–2011 Government Commissioner for the EU Danube Strategy
- 2009–2017 President of the Hungarian Chamber of Engineers
- 2004–2009: Member of the European Parliament
- 2000–2003: Ambassador to Austria
- 1994–1998: Member of the Hungarian Parliament
- 1992–1994: Titular Undersecretary of State, Ministry of Economic Affairs
- High Commissioner for the Hungarian Expo
- 1992–1994: Chairman of the Council for the Hungarian Expo
- 1990–1994: Councillor, Budapest City Council
- 1965–1990: Project engineer
- Research fellow
- 1991: Principal Private Secretary, Ministry of Transport, Communications and Water Management
- 1990–1992: leader, MDF party group on the Council
- 1990–1992: Chairman of the Urban Development Committee, Budapest City Council
- 1990–1991: Vice-Chairman of the Hungarian Chamber of Engineers

== Decorations ==
- Grand Decoration for Services to the Republic of Austria in Silver with Sash

== See also ==
- 2004 European Parliament election in Hungary
