= Yellow-star house =

Hungarian Jewish ghettoised housing

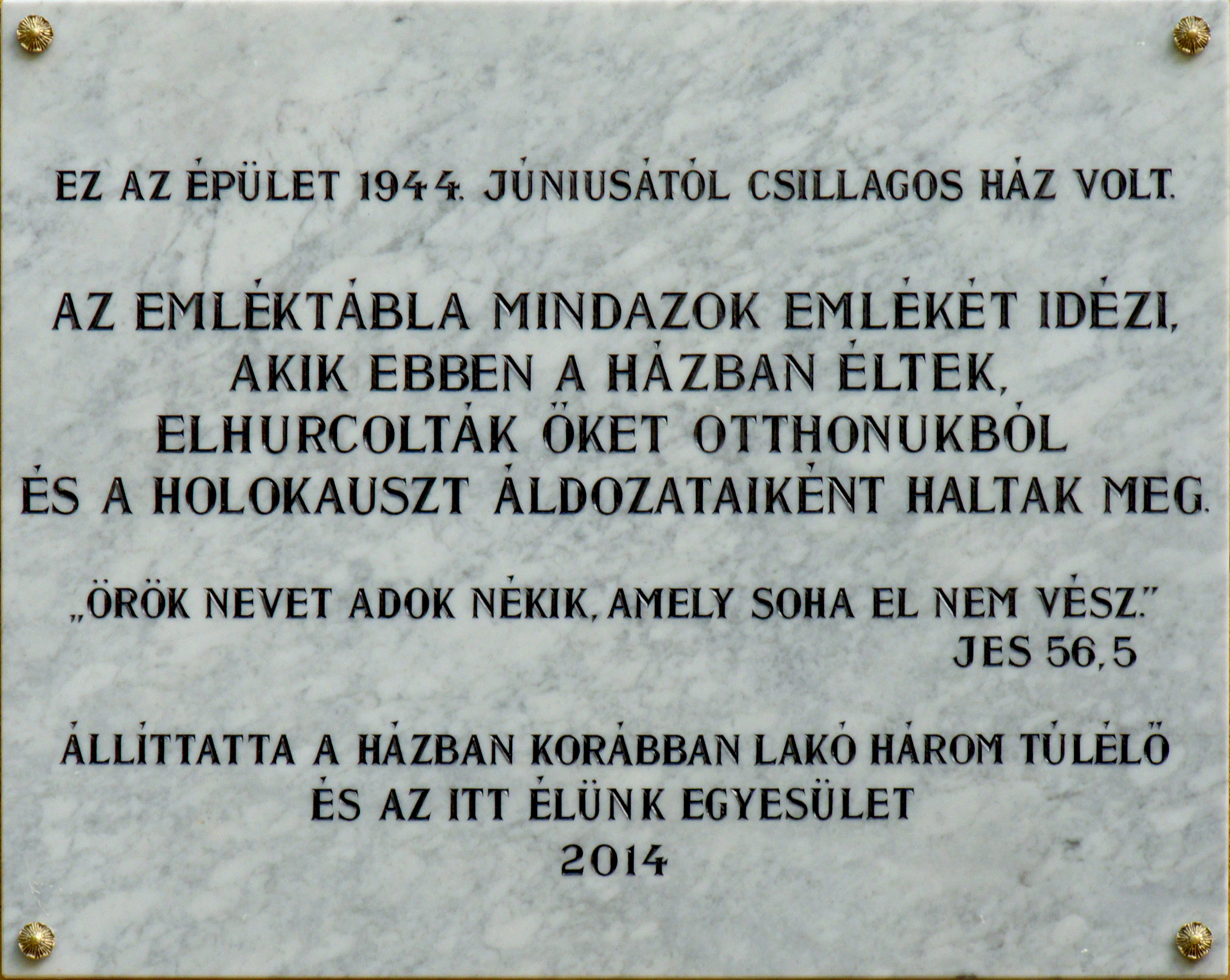
Budapest mayoral decree

The yellow-star houses were a network of almost 1,950 designated compulsory places of residence for around 220,000 Budapest Jews from 21 June 1944 until late November 1944. Both the houses and their residents were obliged to display the yellow star by Budapest mayoral decree.

== Unique in the Holocaust ==
Although houses reserved for Jews were occasionally marked in Germany, and Nazi-occupied France and the Netherlands, the Hungarian legal prescription of marking all Budapest houses in which Jews were obliged to reside with a yellow star was unique in the history of the Holocaust.

== Antecedents ==
A series of anti-Jewish laws and decrees introduced from 1938 onwards gradually excluded Jews from participation in intellectual professions, banned marriages and sexual relations between Jewish men and non-Jewish women, and designated individuals as ‘Jewish’ on the basis of family lineage, thus defining those who had converted to Christianity as Jews.

On 25 November 1940, Hungary joined the Axis, and declared war on the Soviet Union on 27 June 1941.

Jewish men and others defined as ‘politically unreliable’ were conscripted for forced labour in auxiliary roles from 1941 onward. By 1942, tens of thousands of Jewish forced labourers had been sent to the Eastern Front to face arduous conditions.

In a bid to stop her wartime ally from leaving the war, Germany troops occupied Hungary on 19 March 1944. Former Hungarian ambassador to Berlin Döme Sztójay was appointed prime minister by Regent Miklós Horthy, and Adolf Eichmann and his commando also arrived in Budapest on the same day.

From 5 April 1944, all individuals defined as Jewish and over the age of six were obliged to wear a 10 x 10 cm yellow Star of David on their outer clothing.

In May 1944, the Hungarian Interior Ministry limited Jews’ access to bath houses, hotels, restaurants and cinemas, and prescribed certain times of day when Jews were allowed to buy rationed groceries.

== Creation of the yellow-star houses ==
On 16 June 1944, with the aim of forcibly relocating and concentration the Jewish community of Budapest, which just under one-quarter of the city’s population Ákos Farkas, the mayor of Budapest issued the first decree and a list of over 2,600 designated yellow-star houses. The deadline for moving in was midnight on 21 June 1944.

A second Budapest mayoral decree issued on 24 June 1944 attached a final list of 1,944 designated yellow-star houses.

In the intervening period, residents submitted petitions to Budapest Metropolitan Council: non-Jews wanted their houses removed from the list, while Jewish residents wanted their houses added. Compared to the first June 16 list of houses, the second list contained far fewer houses on the western Buda side of the Danube.

Mass relocation was overseen by the police and the Jewish Council in Hungary.

The 1,944 yellow-star houses functioned as compulsory places of residence for Budapest Jews until late November 1944 when, following the Arrow Cross takeover of power on 15 October 1944, Jews were moved into the 7th district ghetto, or to a ‘protected’ house in the 13th district, where neutral states in World War II (Sweden, Switzerland, Spain, Portugal, and the Vatican), as well as the Italian diplomat Giorgio Perlasca, and the International Committee of the Red Cross provided protection for those holding protection documents in 119 ‘protected’ houses, 98 of which were also yellow-star houses.

== See also ==
- History of antisemitism
- History of the Jews in Hungary
- Arrow Cross Party
- Budapest ghetto
- Adolf Eichmann
- Miklós Horthy
- Glass House (Budapest)
- Carl Lutz
- Giorgio Perlasca
- Angelo Rotta
- Ángel Sanz-Briz
- Raoul Wallenberg
