= Béla Magyari =

Hungarian astronaut and colonel (1949–2018)

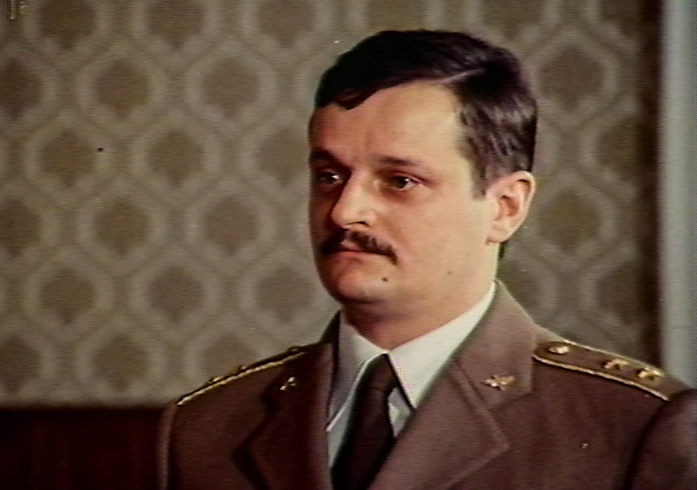
- Born: August 8, 1949; Kiskunfélegyháza, Hungary
- Died: April 23, 2018
- Occupation: Pilot
- Space career

Interkosmos Cosmonaut
- Rank: Brigadier General, Hungarian Air Force

Béla Magyari (8 August 1949 – 23 April 2018) was a colonel in the Hungarian Air Force. He graduated from the György Kilián Air Force Academy in 1969.

== Early life and military career ==
He started flying at the age of fifteen at the MHSZ flying club in Kiskunfélegyháza, where he achieved a silver-coloured glider rating. In 1966 he enrolled at the Kilián György Aviation Technical College. He started to fly a powered plane at the pre-training camp.

From 1967 to 1969 he was a student at the Kilián College, and from 1970 to 1972 he was a student at the Krasnodar Aviation Officer College in the Soviet Union. In 1972 he graduated with a red diploma with honours. In 1972 he became a lieutenant in the Hungarian Air Force as a flight officer of the 47th Fighter Squadron, a pilot squadron of the 47th Fighter Wing based at the Pápa airport. He flew MiG-21s. In 1973 he received a third class fighter pilot rating, in 1977 a first class fighter pilot rating and in 1980 a gold-coloured first class fighter pilot rating. He was allowed to fly supersonic aircraft until 1987, when he was no longer allowed to do so due to myocarditis.[3]

== Intercosmos program ==
The Interkosmos cooperation led by the Soviet Union made it possible for a representative from each of the member countries to go into space. The selection of Hungarian astronaut candidates from among fighter pilots began in May 1977 at the Aeromedical Research and Testing Institute in Kecskemét. As a result of the tests, four pilots were selected, two of whom (he and Bertalan Farkas) underwent further training at the Gagarin Space Training Centre together with their Soviet colleagues between 1978 and 1980.

Bertalan Farkas's astronaut colleague and commander was Valery Kubasov, and Bela Magyari's was Vladimir Dzhanyibekov. Both Hungarians completed their training with excellent results, and the Hungarian government selected Bertalan Farkas to fly in the Soyuz-36 spacecraft, while Béla Magyari was ready to replace him all the time.[4] After the mission, he was promoted from captain to major and received the Order of the Flag of the Hungarian People's Republic, decorated with a laurel wreath.[5]

In 1981, he studied at the Faculty of Transport Engineering of the Budapest University of Technology. Later he received a doctorate from the University of Miskolc. His thesis was on materials science experiments in Hungarian-Soviet space flight; crystallization of aluminium-copper alloy under microgravity conditions. In the early 1990s, he worked in the Ministry of Finance, where he was responsible for the economic accounting of the Soviet troop withdrawal, including the control of the airfields left behind when the Soviet forces were withdrawn from Hungary. In 1992, he was returned to the Ministry of Defence[7][8] and in 1995 he became a colonel. In 1998, he was the commander of the Hungarian technical contingent liaison officers in Okučani for six months, and in Sarajevo he was the commander of an SFOR team that surveyed the bases and recorded their environmental conditions.[9] He retired from the Defence Forces in 2001. He was then elected president of the Hungarian Astronautical Society and later worked for the Hungarian Space Research Office. His ashes were scattered from a plane over the airport of Kiskunfélegyháza.[10]

== Awards ==
- Order of the Flag of the Hungarian *People's Republic with laurel wreath (1980)
- Astronaut of the Hungarian People's Republic (1980)
- MHSZ Gold Medal for Outstanding Work (1981)[11]
- Honorary citizen of Kiskunfélegyháza

== In memory of ==
- The trained astronaut: Béla Magyari (portrait film, 1979)
- Béla Magyari memorial plaque, Kistarcsa, Simándy Square, Space Tree (23 April 2019)
- Memorial plaque in the military plot of the Fiumei Úti Graveyard (8 August 2019).
- Memorial exhibition at the Kiskun Museum in Kiskunfélegyháza (2019)
- Béla Magyari memorial plaque at Kiskunfélegyháza airport (8 August 2020)
- MiG-21U aircraft named after Béla Magyari (10 September 2021)[12]
