= 1992 in Hungary =

- Decades: 1970s; 1980s; 1990s; 2000s; 2010s
- See also: Other events of 1992; List of years in Hungary

== Incumbents ==
- President - Árpád Göncz
- Prime Minister - József Antall

== Events ==
=== March ===
- 30 March - Act No. 22 of 1992 - Labour Code (consolidation) is adopted.

=== May ===
- 25–29 May - International conference on interaction of computational methods and measurements in hydraulics and hydrology

=== August ===
- 16 August - The Hungarian Grand Prix is held in Budapest

=== December ===
- 24 December - Duna TV channel is launched.

== Births ==
- 3 November - Willi Orbán, German-born Hungarian international footballer

== Deaths ==
=== January ===
- 2 January – Tibor Gallai, 79, Hungarian mathematician.
- 6 January – Éva Balázs, 49, Hungarian cross-country skier and Olympian.
- 7 January – Andrew Marton, 87, Hungarian-American film director, cancer.
- 8 January – Nicolas Schöffer, 79, Hungarian-French cybernetic artist.
- 31 January – István Sárközi, 44, Hungarian Olympic footballer (1968), traffic collision.

=== February ===
- 9 February – Andor Földes, 78, Hungarian pianist, fall.
- 25 February – Guy Deghy, 79, Hungarian-British actor.
- 29 February – Ferenc Karinthy, 70, Hungarian novelist, playwright, and journalist.

=== July ===
- 30 July – Miklós Borz, 70–71, Hungarian soldier and politician.

=== August ===
- 4 August – József Faddi (71-72), Hungarian agronomist and politician.

== See also ==
- Hungary at the 1992 Summer Olympics
- List of Hungarian films since 1990
