= Timeline of Debrecen =

The following is a timeline of the history of the city of Debrecen, Hungary.

== Prior to 20th century ==
- 1317 - Battle of Debrecen (1317).
- 1538 - Debrecen Calvinist College founded.
- 1552 - Town adopted the Protestant faith.
- 1686 - Town captured by the imperial forces.
- 1693 - Town was made a royal free city.
- 1746 - Church of St. Anne, Debrecen built.
- 1822 - Reformed Great Church built.
- 1849
  - 14 April: Lajos Kossuth proclaimed the deposition of the Habsburg dynasty
  - August: Battle of Debrecen (1849).
  - Heroes' Cemetery, Debrecen established.
  - Town captured by the Russians.
- 1857 - Budapest-Debrecen railway begins operating.
- 1861 - Emlékkert (Debrecen) (park) established.
- 1869 - Debrecen newspaper in publication.
- 1884 - Horse-drawn tram begins operating.
- 1890 - Population: 58,952.
- 1893 - Synagogue built on Pásti Street.
- 1895 - De Ruyter obelisk erected.
- 1897 - Synagogue opens on Deák Ferenc Street.
- 1900 - Population: 75,006.

== 20th century ==
- 1902 - Déri Múzeum and Debreceni VSC (sport club) established.
- 1903 - Debreceni Független Újság newspaper in publication.
- 1910 - Population: 92,729.
- 1911
  - Electric tram begins operating.
  - Debreceni Nagy Újság newspaper in publication.

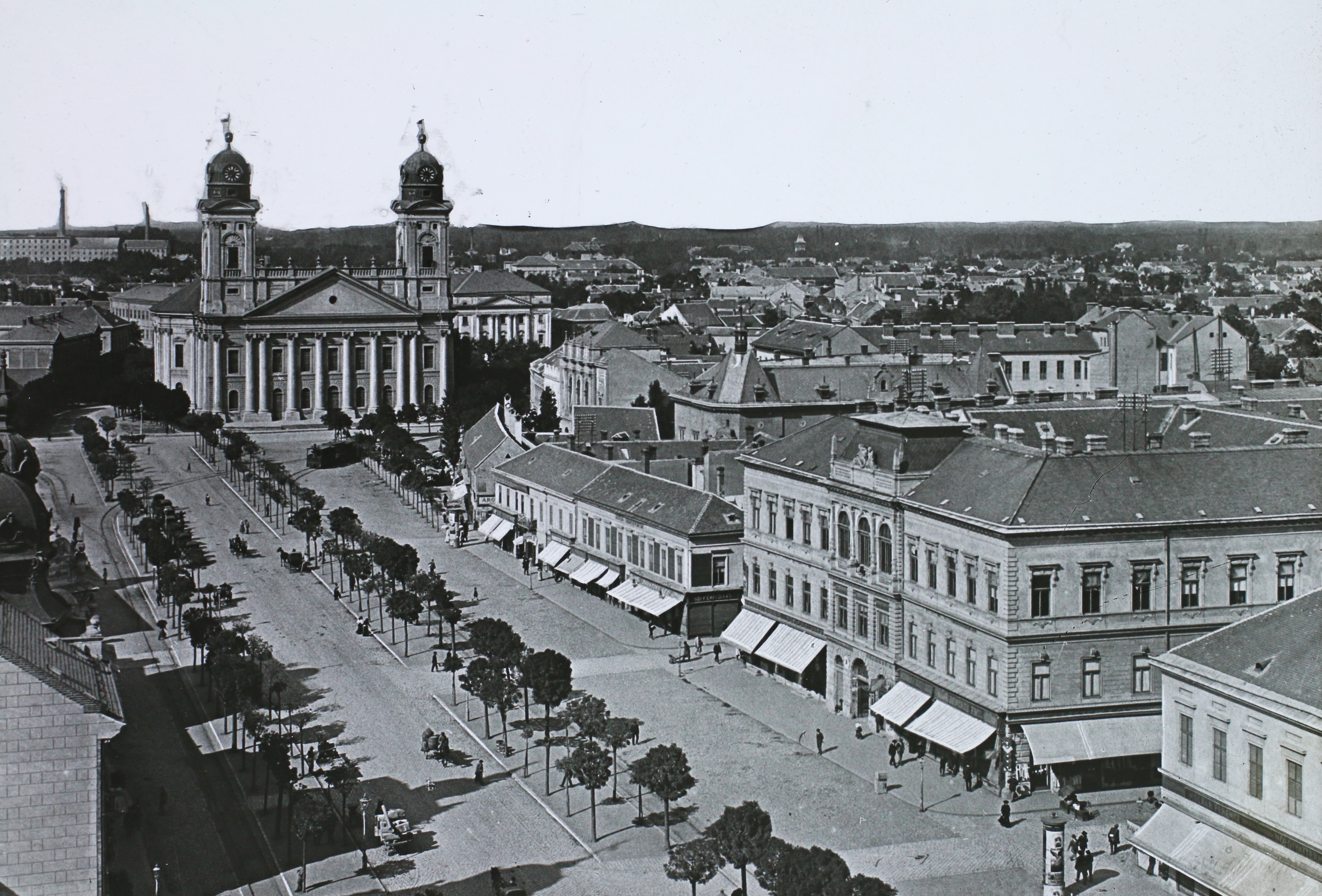
Debrecen in 1912

- 1912
  - Hungarian Royal University established.
  - Debreceni Hírlap newspaper in publication.
- 1914 - Lajos Kossuth statue erected in Belváros (Debrecen).
- 1915 - Grand Hotel Aranybika rebuilt.
- 1930
  - Debrecen Airport begins operating.
  - Population: 116,013.
- 1944
  - October: Battle of Debrecen.
  - 21 December: "Provisional National Assembly meets in recently liberated city of Debrecen."
- 1950 - Stadion Oláh Gábor Út (stadium) opens (approximate date).
- 1955 - Debreceni VSC wins its first Hungarian women's handball championship.
- 1958 - Debrecen Zoo opens.
- 1960 - Population: 134,930.
- 1961 - Debrecen Station rebuilt.
- 1966
  - István Ács becomes mayor.
  - Debrecen flower festival active.
- 1970 - Debreceni Vadkakasok basketball team formed.
- 1974 - Population: 179,755.
- 1980 - Population: 198,195.
- 1981 - Debrecen hosts the 1981 European Judo Championships.
- 1985 - Debrecen trolleybus begins operating.
- 1988 - Debrecen Philharmonic Orchestra founded.
- 1990 - József Hevessy becomes mayor.
- 1991
  - Debrecen Reformed Theological University active.
  - 18 August: Visit of Pope John Paul II.
- 1993 - Roman Catholic Diocese of Debrecen–Nyíregyháza established.
- 1995 - Sister city partnership signed between Debrecen and Lublin, Poland.
- 1998 - Lajos Kósa becomes mayor.

== 21st century ==
- 2002
  - February: Főnix Hall arena opens.
  - November: Debrecen hosts the 2002 World Artistic Gymnastics Championships.
- 2003 - Debrecen Waterpark built.
- 2004 - Debrecen co-hosts the 2004 European Women's Handball Championship.
- 2005 - Debreceni VSC wins its first Hungarian football championship.
- 2006 - Debrecen Swimming Pool Complex opens.
- 2007 - Debrecen hosts the 2007 European Short Course Swimming Championships.
- 2008 - Debrecen Market Hall built.

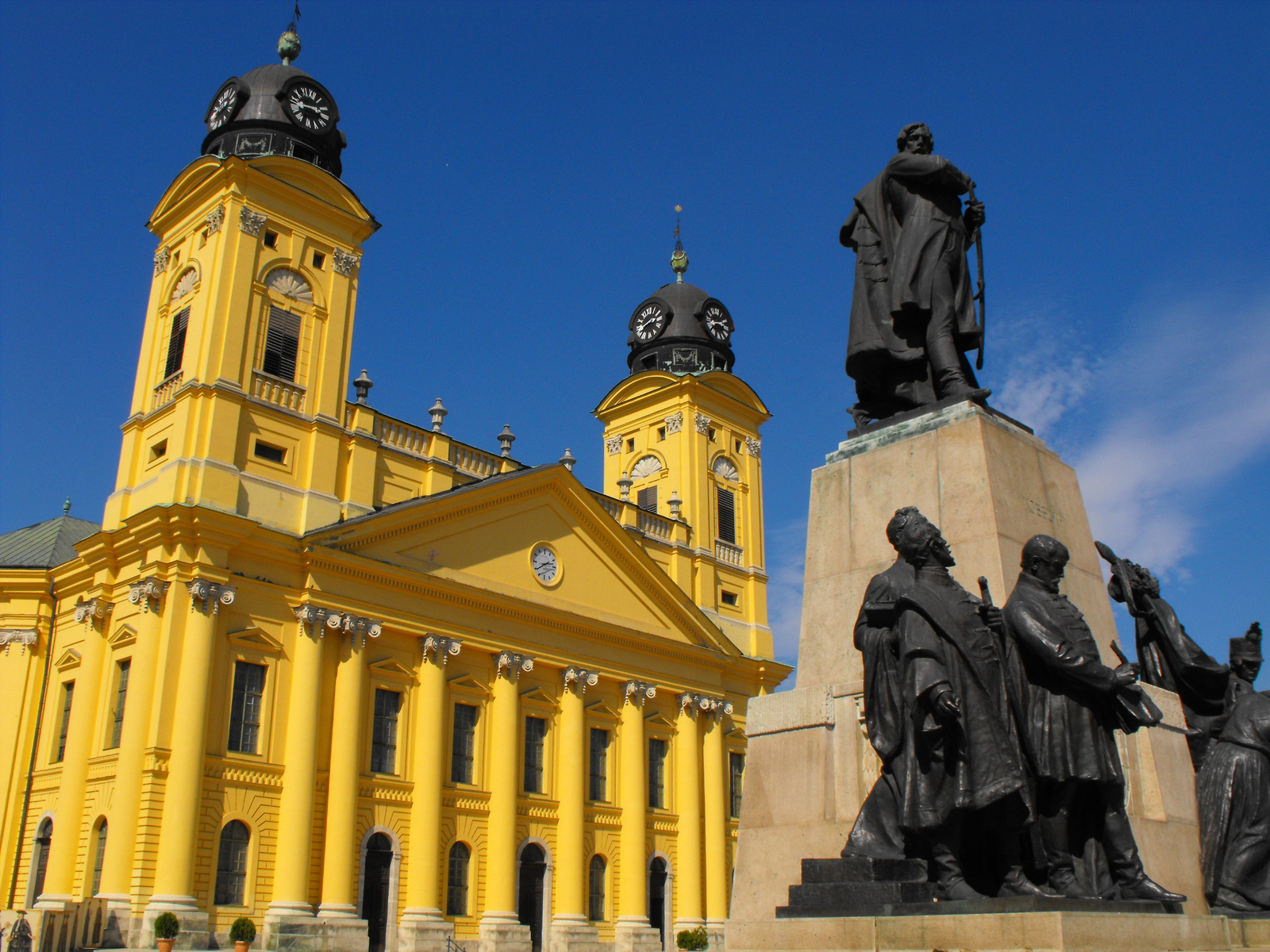
Debrecen in the 2010s

- 2010 - Debrecen co-hosts the 2010 UEFA Futsal Championship.
- 2011 - Population: 211,320.
- 2012 - Debrecen co-hosts the 2012 European Aquatics Championships.
- 2013 - Debrecen hosts the 2013 World Short Track Speed Skating Championships.
- 2014
  - Papp László becomes mayor.
  - December: Debrecen co-hosts the 2014 European Women's Handball Championship.
- 2015
  - June: Debrecen co-hosts the EuroBasket Women 2015.
  - June: Migrant unrest.
- 2020 - Debrecen hosts the 2020 European Short Track Speed Skating Championships.
- 2021 - Pope John Paul II monument unveiled in the 30th anniversary of his visit.
- 2022 - Debrecen co-hosts the 2022 European Men's Handball Championship.

== See also ==
- Debrecen history
- List of mayors of Debrecen
- Timelines of other cities in Hungary: Budapest

== Bibliography ==
=== in English ===
- "Debreczin", Chambers's Encyclopaedia, London: W. & R. Chambers, 1901, hdl:2027/uc2.ark:/13960/t0vq37095
- "Hungary: Debreczin". Handbook for Travellers in South Germany and Austria (15th ed.). London: J. Murray. 1903 – via Internet Archive.
- "Debreczin", Austria-Hungary, Leipzig: Karl Baedeker, 1905, OCLC 344268
- "Debreczen" . Encyclopædia Britannica. Vol. 7 (11th ed.). 1910. p. 905.
- L. Passuth (1962), "Sexcentenary of Debrecen", New Hungarian Quarterly, vol. 3

=== in other languages ===
- István Szűcs [in Hungarian] (1871). Debreczen város tőrténelme [Historic City of Debreczen] (in Hungarian). Debreczen.
- Bela Toth (1981), "Debrecen konyvtari kulturaja a 18. szazadban" [Library Facilities in 18th century Debrecen], Magyar Konyvszemle (in Hungarian), vol. 1–2
