= 2004 in Hungary =

- Decades: 1980s; 1990s; 2000s; 2010s; 2020s
- See also: Other events of 2004; List of years in Hungary

This article discusses the year 2004 in Hungary.

== Incumbents ==
- President – Ferenc Mádl
- Prime Minister – Péter Medgyessy (until 29 September), Ferenc Gyurcsány (starting 29 September)
- Speaker – Katalin Szili

== Events ==
=== May ===
- May 1 - Hungary joins the European Union.

=== June ===
- June 13 - 2004 European Parliament election in Hungary Fidesz Wins.

=== December ===
- December 5 - 2004 Hungarian dual citizenship referendum Both measures were approved by voters.
- August 29 - The IOC officially stripped Adrián Annus of his Hammer Throw gold for the doping scandal

== Births ==
● July 12, 2004 - Antal Yaakobishvili

● April 29, 2004 - Balázs Tóth

● September 7, 2004 - Zsombor Gruber

== Deaths ==
=== January ===
- 25 January – Miklós Fehér, 24, Hungarian football player, cardiac arrest.

=== February ===
- 2 February – Róbert Zimonyi, 85, Hungarian Olympic rower.
- 12 February – Julius Elischer, 85, Hungarian-born Australian architect.

=== March ===
- 8 March – János Bognár, 89, Hungarian Olympic cyclist.

=== April ===
- 13 April – Csaba Horváth, 74, Hungarian-born American chemical engineer and scientist.

== See also ==
- Hungary at the 2004 Summer Olympics
- List of Hungarian films since 1990
