= 1919 in Hungary =

- Decades: 1890s; 1900s; 1910s; 1920s; 1930s
- See also: Other events of 1919; List of years in Hungary

The following lists events in the year 1919 in Hungary.

== Incumbents ==
- President: Mihály Károlyi (until 21 March), Sándor Garbai (21 March-1 August), István Friedrich (23 August - 24 November), Károly Huszár (from 24 November)
- Regent: Archduke Joseph August (7-23 August)
- Prime Minister: Mihály Károlyi (until 11 January), Dénes Berinkey (11 January - 21 March), Sándor Garbai (21 March-1 August), Gyula Peidl (1-6 August), István Friedrich (6 August - 24 November), Károly Huszár (from 24 November)
- Presidents of the National Assembly of Councils (14 June - 6 August): Péter Ágoston, Dezső Bokányi, Miska Kovács, Jenő Pósz, János Szokob, Lajos Urbán

== Events ==
=== January ===
- January 1 – Czech troops occupied Pozsony (now Bratislava)
- January 3 –
  - Romania begins pacifying the Zsil Valley (now Jiu Valley) in southern Transylvania by collecting weapons
  - Mass looting in Salgótarján, after the communist-aligned workers' council takes control. A detachment from Hatvan restores order with about 18 deaths and 50 injuries.
- January 6 – First clash between Romanian and Hungarian forces at Egeres (now Aghireșu)
- January 7 -
  - At an MSZDP meeting, Károlyi and Kunfi intervenes against Garami so that the party does not withdraw from government
  - A pro-Czechoslovak Ruthenian council in Eperjes (now Prešov) declares Carpathian Ruthenia for Czechoslovakia
- January 8
  - Hutsul Republic declared in Körösmező (now Yasinia)
  - Transylvanian Saxons declare for Romania in Medgyes (now Mediaș)
  - Allied economic committee sent by the American mission of Archibald Cary Coolidge arrives to Budapest, led by Alonzo E. Taylor
- January 10 – France declares a buffer zone in the Banat between Serbian and Romanian troops (occupied on January 25-30)
- January 11 – Mihály Károlyi named provisional President of the Republic by the National Council, tasked to form a new government
- January 12 – Czechoslovak forces capture Ungvár (now Uzhgorod)
- January 13 –
  - Székely Division halts Romanian advance at Cigányi (now Crișeni)
  - Árpád Paál finishes his memorandum on a "Székely Republic"
- January 14 – Romanians arrest István Apáthy for trying to resist the establishment of Romanian administration in Kolozsvár (now Cluj-Napoca)
- January 15–29 – A Czech legion temporarily occupies Balassagyarmat, pushed out by local resistance
- January 16 – Furthest advance of West-Ukrainian forces into Carpathian Ruthenia. From the Hutsul republic, they reach Máramarossziget (now Sighetu Marmației) where they are pushed back by Romanian troops. Another column advances to Munkács (now Mukachevo) and Csap (now Chop), but retreats after the failure at Máramarossziget.
- January 17 – Romania occupies Máramarossziget
- January 16–29 – Battle of Csucsa (now Ciucea), Romanian advance halted
- January 19
  - Berinkey Government is formed
  - Hungarian National Defense Association (MOVE) rally at Gólyavár. Gömbös's speech against the Károlyi regime. Gömbös becomes president of MOVE.
  - West-Ukrainian forces withdraw from Csap (now Chop) and Munkács (now Mukachevo)
- January 21 –
  - Telegram by Clemenceau demands Romanians halt their advance
  - All-People's Transcarpathian Congress in Huszt (now Khust) declares for West-Ukraine
- January 23 – Central Workers' Council expels communists from unions
- January 29 – Act VI of 1919: Autonomy established for Germans in West Hungary. Géza Zsombor appointed as governor.
- January 30 – Communists attack the gendarmerie in Makó and overthrow the local National Council. A worker's council takes over the governance of the city.
- January 31 – Disarmament of the population in Makó leads to a firefight, 5 people are killed

=== February ===
- February 1 – Paris Peace Conference decides to cede Transylvania to Romania, details are delegated to sub-committee led by André Tardieu
- February 2 – Act XVII of 1919 on land reform passed, mostly never implemented
- February 3 – János Junker appointed minister for the German minorities
- February 5 – The Czech delegation presents its proposal to the Paris Peace Conference, including the Czech Corridor
- February 8 - First meeting (of 12) of the Commission on Romanian and Yugoslav Affairs at the Paris Peace Conference
- February 12 –
  - Czech forces leave Csap (now Chop)
  - In Pozsony (now Bratislava), the German and Hungarian population started a protest against the Czechoslovak occupation, the Czechoslovak Legions opened fire on the unarmed demonstrators. The intervention by the Czechoslovak soldiers firing on the peaceful demonstrators caused 8 deaths and 14 injuries.
- February 13 – Communists attack the Military Nursing Office and remove its leadership
- February 16 - Act XVIII of 1919 on land reform
- February 19 –
  - István Bethlen forms the Party of National Unification (NEP)
  - Paris Peace Conference proposes a Neutral Zone between Romania and Hungary
- February 20 – Communists attack MSZDP newspaper Népszava's building, 8 fatalities
- February 21 –
  - Communist leaders arrested. Béla Kun is beaten up and imprisoned
  - 100-150 thousand pro-MSZDP workers demonstrate against the communist attack
- February 22 – Jászi dissolves his Civic Radical Party, advising his followers to join the Social Democrats
- February 23 – Károlyi ceremonially starts land reform on his own Heves county estates (Kápolna)
- February 23–26 – Battle of Zilah (now Zalău)
- February 26 – Paris Peace Conference approves the finalized version of the neutral zone between Romanian and Hungarian forces
- February 27 – Paris Peace Conference establishes its Committee on Czecho-Slovakia. It would hold ten sessions, last on May 5.
- February 28 - March 5 – Czech Corridor proposal discussed and rejected under Italian pressure

=== March ===
- March 1 –
  - Free elections scheduled for April 10
  - Army of Hungary led by Paul-Joseph de Lobit separated from the Armée d'Orient
- March 2 – Mihály Károlyi's speech in Szatmárnémeti in front of the Székely Division, declaring armed resistance against allied territorial demands
- March 4 – Elections held in Rus'ka Krajina
- March 5 – People's Law establishes a Party-list proportional system, never implemented
- March 10 – The Kaposvár Workers' Council overthrows the local county government and established a 3-member directory
- March 12 – Act XIX. of 1919 on Slovak Autonomy
  - March 15 – Election rally of János Vass is crashed by József Migray's band
- March 18 – Commission on Romanian and Yugoslav Affairs finalizes the division of the Banat. On a sudden American proposal, 8 full settlements and some other areas in Torontál county (around Szeged) would stay with Hungary.
- March 20
  - The Vix Note demands Hungary withdraw over 100 km to the Szeged–Debrecen–Vásárosnamény line
  - Berinkey Government resigns
  - Hungarian National Council dissolved
- March 21
  - MSZDP and KMP unite to form the Socialist Party of Hungary
  - Károlyi falls from power
  - Hungary rejects the Vix Note
  - 17:00 – Soldiers' Council declares for the communists, takes control of key points of Budapest
  - Hungarian Soviet Republic declared
  - from 22:00 – First joint meeting of the Socialist Party of Hungary, Revolutionary Governing Council established
- March 22 – The Hungarian Soviet Republic is proclaimed to the public on the famous "To Everyone!" (Mindenkihez!) posters.
- March 23 – Czechoslovak massacre in Zselíz (Želiezovce) (5 killed)
- March 26 – Red Guard established
- March 29 – April 6 – Székelys revolt in Sóvidék

=== April ===
- April 1 – The National Guard and Financial Guard are merged into the Red Army
- April 4
  - Provisional constitution establishes new election system
  - Lands above 100 acres nationalized
- April 4–5 – Smuts Mission: Jan Smuts offers a more favorable demarcation line, the Soviet government rejects it
- April 5 – On its last session, the Commission on Romanian and Yugoslav Affairs approves its border proposal for the Romanian-Hungarian border and the division of the Banat
- April 7–14 – Council elections in Soviet Hungary
- April 10 – Zala county is split into Lower and Upper Zala counties.
- April 12 – Bethlen forms the Antibolsevista Comité (ABC) in Vienna
- April 14 – Anti-Soviet group formed in French-occupied Szeged by Béla Kelemen.
- April 16 – Successful Romanian offensive launched to capture Tiszántúl and Carpathian Ruthenia
- April 19 – Romanian troops and civilians massacred 91 Hungarian civilians in Köröstárkány (now Tărcaia)
- April 19–24 – Counter-revolution in Carpathian Ruthenia
- April 21–22 – Counter-revolution in Alsólendva
- April 23
  - Romanians enter Debrecen
  - Böhm becomes commander of Tiszántúl operations
- April 26
  - ABC sends Gyula Gömbös to Szeged
  - Part of the Székely Battalion surrenders at Demecser
- April 27
  - Czechoslovak forces attack the Hungarian Soviet Republic
  - French troops occupy Makó

=== May ===
- May 1
  - Romanians cross the Tisza at Tiszafüred and Szolnok, but withdraw on Entente pressure
  - Hungarian workers' militias cross the Danube at Komárom, massacred by Czechoslovak forces
  - Oszkár Jászi emigrates to Vienna
- May 2
  - Morning: Böhm dispatches Parlimentairs to negotiate armistices with the intervention, later recalled Romania demands demobilization, handover of transport vehicles and 8 bridgeheads on the Tisza for an armistice. However, due to both American pressure, and Soviet threats on Bessarabia, Romania would not advance further into Hungary.
  - Czech forces capture Miskolc
  - Full-scale Czechoslovak attack on Salgótarján begins
  - Kun and Böhm speak in front of the Workers' and Soldiers' Council, call for the mobilization of the proletariat, resolve to continue fighting
  - Bankgasse robbery: ABC members steal 100 million Korona from the Hungarian Embassy in Vienna
  - In the power vacuum, counter-revolutionaries establish control in Szolnok, led by Lajos Thurzó, Antal Bordás-Lassenberg and Andor Kuster. A white guard of 700-800 men is formed.
- May 3 – Red army (by Tibor Szamuely and Ottó Steinbrück) re-captures Szolnok from Romanians and counter-revolutionaries
- May 5
  - Counter-revolution breaks out in Devecser
  - First counter-revolutionary government formed by Gyula Károlyi in Arad
  - Last session of the Committee on Czecho-Slovakia
- May 6 – ABC militia raid repulsed at Bruck am Leitha
- May 8
  - Central Ruthenian National Council headed by Ágoston Volosin declares the union Carpathian Ruthenia with Czechoslovakia
  - Committees of the Paris Peace Conference present recommended border with Romania and Czechoslovakia to the Council of Foreign Ministers
- May 9 –
  - The Workers' Council's system of Trusted Men is abolished in the Red Army
  - The Arad government departs for Szeged, but is intercepted by Romanians at Mezőhegyes and held captive for two weeks.
- May 10 – Anti-Soviet Social Democrat Garami negotiates with Sir Thomas Montgomery-Cuninghame in Vienna
- May 12 –
  - Supreme Council of the Paris Peace Conference accepts border proposals. Aside from the Austrian claims to Western Hungary, these roughly match the final borders to be defined by the Treaty of Trianon
  - Guido Romanelli is delegated to Budapest from the Italian Allied Mission in Vienna.
- May 15 – Last session of the ABC. They agree that Pál Teleki should join the Arad/Szeged government, while Bethlen should stay to represent them from Vienna
- May 17 – Romanians enter French occupied Arad. Despite only given permission to station troops in certain areas, Romania de facto takes over the city and dismantles Hungarian civil administration. French troops refuse to leave, but don't resist Romanian actions.
- May 19–20 – Battle of Kisterenye, Hungary repulses Czech attempts to encircle Salgótarján
- May 20 – Meeting of Catholics in Budapest led by bishop János Mészáros, on the establishment of new grassroots parishes
- May 20–21 – Hungary re-captures Miskolc, then repulses a combined Czech-Romanian counter-attack. French advisors replace Italians in the Czech army
- May 29 –
  - Republic of Prekmurje declared
  - French general Pellé becomes the commander of Czechoslovak forces, replacing Italian leadership
- May 30 – Northern Campaign begins with the aim to push back Czechoslovak forces
- May 31 – The Arad government flees to French-occupied Szeged. Some members are interned by Romanian forces. The First Szeged Government formed, including some former ABC members. Miklós Horthy becomes Minister of Defense.

=== June ===
- June 1 – Railway strike begins in Transdanubia
- June 4 – Counterrevolution in Nagycenk
- June 6
  - Hungary re-captures Kassa (now Košice)
  - Second Szeged Government established
  - The Szeged Government establishes the National Army led by Horthy
- June 7 – The Paris Peace Conference urges Hungary to withdraw, but does not specify a demarcation line. Béla Kun requests clarification, prompting the conference to finalize the border
- June 10 – Hungary re-captures Bártfa (Bardejov), effectively cutting off Carpathian Ruthenia from Czechoslovak forces
- June 12 – Paris Peace Conference finalizes Hungary's future borders with Romania and Czechoslovakia. They reject extensive Czechoslovak demands, but agree to cede Ipolyság (Šahy) to Czechoslovakia.
- June 13 – Clemenceau Note: Clemenceau urges the Hungarian Soviet Republic to withdraw from Upper Hungary, presents Hungary with the planned borders
- June 14 – National Assembly of Councils, the Soviet Republic's legislature convenes for the first and only time
- June 15 - 17 – Romanian troops replace the French in Makó
- June 16 – Slovak Soviet Republic declared
- June 18 – Counter-revolutionary uprisings around the areas of Dunapataj, Ráckeve, Érsekcsanád, Szekszárd, Kalocsa and extending up to Transdanubia, brutally suppressed
- June 22 – Pellé's final ultimatum to cease hostilities in Upper Hungary
- June 23
  - Final constitution of the Socialist Federative Republic of Councils in Hungary passed
  - Hungarians in Apátfalva rise up against Romanian occupation. The returning Romanian forces kill 41 people in retaliation.
- June 24
  - Ceasefire ends the Northern Campaign, effective from 5:00 at dawn, the Hungarian Red Army Command agreed with the ceasefire and retreat
  - Counter-revolutionary uprising in Budapest by Ludovika militias and the Danubian flotilla
  - Counter-revolutionary uprising in Szentendre
- June 29
  - The Hungarian Red Army complete the retreat to the demarcation line (to July 7)
  - Right-wing paramilitaries of the Graz Command raid Fürstenfeld for weapons.

=== July ===
- July 3 – Aurél Stromfeld resigns from Command
- July 5 –
  - Mihály Károlyi flees from Hungary
  - On the initiative of Gömbös, Horthy is elected honorary president of MOVE in Szeged
- July 10 - 11 – Upon Austrian request, the Paris Peace Conference revises its plans for the Austro-Hungarian border, ceding Burgenland to Austria. The border with Czechoslovakia is also revised to cede Pozsonyligetfalu (Petržalka) to Czechoslovakia as a "bridgehead" across the Danube at Bratislava.
- July 12 – Gyula Károlyi resigns to Dezső Ábrahám to allied pressure, forming the Third Szeged Government
- July 16 - 22 – French troops leave the Banat neutral zone (but remain in Szeged)
- July 20 – Hungary launches its offensive across the Tisza against the Romanian army
- July 22 – Czechoslovak legionaries blow up third of Mária Valéria Bridge on the northern side
- July 23 – Böhm negotiates with Cuninghame in Vienna
- July 24 – Romanian counterattack in Tiszántúl crushes the Red Army
- July 25 – Mass murder in Hódmezővásárhely by Romanian troops
- July 27 – Serbian troops leave Temesvár (now Timișoara) after unsuccessful attempts to make the city declare for the Yugoslav state. French troops remain until the handover to Romania is complete.
- July 28 – Romanian forces cross the Tisza at Tiszalök
- July 31 – Romanians capture Szolnok

=== August ===
- August 1
  - Béla Kun and the Revolutionary Governing Council resigns, effectively ending the Hungarian Soviet Republic. Gyula Peidl forms a purely social democratic government by the approval of the Soldiers' and Workers' council
  - Hungarian counter-attack briefly re-captures Szolnok
  - Romanians capture Füzesabony, Miskolc is cut off from Budapest
- August 2
  - The Peidl Government restores the Hungarian People's Republic
  - Romanians capture Cegléd, the encircled troops in Szolnok surrender or flee by 3 PM.
- August 3
  - Romanian forces enter Temesvár (now Timișoara)
  - Red Guard dissolved
  - Defense minister Haubrich orders secession of hostilities, the disarmament of the Red Army remnants
  - Counter-revolutionary takeover begins in Vas County
- August 4
  - (On the night of August 3rd–4th) A detachment of 160 officers of the National army leaves Szeged to Transdanubia, led by Pál Prónay
  - Romanian forces enter Budapest
  - The directory of Szekszárd is overthrown
  - Former ABC members, the Szeged Government and Vilmos Böhm negotiate in Jockey Club, Vienna. The Graz Command refuses to accept the Peidl Government and decides to invade Hungary
- August 5 -
  - The Paris Peace Conference agrees to send a military mission to Budapest
  - The White Terror begins in Szatymaz, where Prónay's soldiers kill 13 people, including painter Anna Kukovetz
- August 6
  - Antal Lehár arrives to Szombathely, takes command of counter-revolutionary forces in Western Hungary
  - Habsburg legitimist Friedrich overthrows Peidl in Budapest
- August 7
  - Freidrich declares Archduke Joseph August head of state as Regent
  - Archduke Joseph August appoints Friedrich as Prime Minister, forms a Provisional Caretaker Government
  - Lehár's legitimists enter Kőszeg after "some resistance"
- August 8 - Prónay crosses the Danube from Solt to Dunaföldvár
- August 9
  - Horthy declares himself independent of the Szeged Government
  - Romanians capture Székesfehérvár
- August 11
  - Allied Military Mission arrives to Budapest (Harry Hill Bandholtz, Reginald Gorton, Jean César Graziani, and Ernesto Mombelli)
  - The remaining brigade of the Székely Battalion arrives to Mosonmagyaróvár
- August 12
  - Yugoslav-forces occupy Muravidék (now Prekmurje)
  - Joseph August declares Horthy Supreme Commander
- August 13
  - Horthy flies from Szeged to Siófok to take command of his troops in Transdanubia
  - Czechoslovak forces crossing the Danube across Pozsony (now Bratislava), occupying Ligetfalu (now Petržalka)
  - Antal Szigray declared governor of West Hungary (Moson, Sopron, Vas, Zala)
- August 15
  - Horthy takes oath to Joseph August, formally installed as Supreme Commander
  - Friedrich forms a new government
- August 17 – Council of Germans in Németújvár (now Güssing) declare for Austria
- August 18 – Romania occupies Veszprém and Győr
- August 19 – Third and last Szeged Government resigns
- August 20
  - Horthy's Order 95/II, declares command over all Hungarian forces
  - Friedrich Government declares martial law
- August 21 – Romanians raid Mosonmagyaróvár
- August 23 – Archduke Joseph August resigns to allied pressure
- August 24 – Social Democratic Party of Hungary re-established by Károly Peyer
- August 25 – Christian Social and Economic Party founded
- August 28 – Romanians raid Kapuvár
- August 30 – Christian National Party founded

=== September ===
- September 3 – National Smallholders and Agricultural Laborers' Party Party founded
- September 8 – Friedrich visits Szombathely, negotiates with local forces
- September 9 – Pogrom in Tapolca and Diszel kills 15 people
- September 10 – Treaty of Saint-Germain-en-Laye, Allies cede part of Western-Hungary (today Burgenland, Sopron and 8 villages) to Austria
- September 21–23 – Horthy visits Western Transdunabia, negotiates with local forces

=== October ===
- October 2 – November 14 – Romanians withdraw from Transdunabia
- October 5 – USA General Harry Hill Bandholtz prevents the Romanian looting of the Hungarian National Museum.
- October 23 – Sir George Clerk arrives to Budapest to facilitate the formation of a new Hungarian government
- October 25 – Christian National Party and Christian Social and Economic Party unifies to form the Christian National Union Party (KNEP)

=== November ===
- November 1 – Horthy denounces violence against Jews committed by the National Army
- November 5 – Negotiations led by George Clerk, an agreement is reached that Miklós Horthy will enter Budapest. Horthy promises not to establish military dictatorship or start a pogrom in Budapest
- November 7 – Paris Peace Council issues ultimatum to Romania to withdraw from Hungary.
- November 14 – Romanians leave Budapest
- November 16 – Horthy's National Army ceremonially enter Budapest
- November 17 – 5985. M.E. of 1919 s. decree re-affirms universal secret suffrage (from age 24, with literacy requirements for women)
- November 21 – National Smallholders and Agricultural Laborers' Party and National '48-er Independence and Agricultural Laborers' Party unite to form the United Smallholders and Agricultural Laborers' Party (OKGFP)
- November 23 – Romania finished withdrawal to the Tisza River
- November 24 – Huszár Government formed with Clerk's supervision
- November 27 – Clash with Yugoslavian forces at Rédics. Hungarian forces march on Alsólendva but repulsed

=== December ===
- December: Allies send provisional missions to Hungary, Thomas Hohler (UK), Maurice Fouchet (France), and Vittorio Cerruti (Italy)
- December 1 – Hungary is invited to the Paris Peace Conference
- December 8–18 – Czech forces withdraw from Balassagyarmat, Salgótarján, Ózd, etc. roughly to the future Trianon border. They remain in Sátoraljaújhely until March 1920.

== Births ==
- 9 January – György Bulányi
- 10 February – Juci Komlós
- 10 February – Ferenc Bessenyei

== Deaths ==
- 27 January – Endre Ady
- 8 April – Loránd Eötvös
- 6 June – Jenő Kvassay
- 20 June – Tivadar Csontváry Kosztka
- 2 August – Tibor Szamuely

== Bibliography ==
- Ablonczy, Balázs (2020). Ismeretlen Trianon. Az összeomlás és a békeszerződés.
- Schuller, Balázs (2005). "Impériumváltás a Zsil-völgyében". Bányászati és Kohászati Lapok (3): 35–38.
- Borsányi, Gy (1988). Októbertől márciusig. Kossuth Könyvkiadó.
- Breitt, J. (1925). A magyarországi 1918/19. évi forradalmi mozgalmak és a vörös háború története.
- Cartledge, B. (2011). The Will to Survive: A History of Hungary. Columbia University Press.
- Csüllög, G. (2020). Gulyás, L. (ed.). Térképek a trianoni békediktátum történetéhez. Vol. IV. Gulyás, L., & Suba, J. Egyesület Közép-Európa Kutatására.
- Demkó, A. (2020). Napról napra Trianon - 1918-1924. Reakció Kiadó Kft.
- Magyar, Endre Lénárd (2020). "A rémuralom készséges szolgája kívánt lenni?": Perjessy Sándor és a Tanácsköztársaság elleni felkelés Szentendrén, 1919. június 24-25. Clio Int. ISBN 978-6150082356.
- Fogarassy, László (1988). A magyarországi Tanácsköztársaság katonai összeomlása. Értekezések a történeti tudományok köréből. Új sorozat. Vol. 109. Budapest: Akadémiai Kiadó. ISBN 963-05-4968-9.
- Glatz, F. (2000). A magyarok krónikája. Budapest. ISBN 9635471890.
- Gulyás, László (2021). Lokális Trianon 1. : Csongrád, Csanád és Torontál vármegye az összeomlás éveiben 1918–1920. Vol. 28. pp. 27–41.
- Gusztáv, Gratz (1992). A forradalmak kora: Magyarország története: 1918-1920. Magyar Szemle Társaság.
- Hatos, Pál (2018). Az elátkozott köztársaság: az 1918-as összeomlás és az őszirózsás forradalom története.
- Hatos, Pál (2021). Rosszfiúk világforradalma. Jaffa Kiadó.
- Hatos, Pál (2025). Hideg polgárháború: Csonka-Magyarország születése 1919-1922. Jaffa Kiadó.
- Liptai, E. (1984). Magyarország hadtörténete. Borus, J., & Tóth, S.
- MacMillan, M. (2003). Paris 1919: six months that changed the world. New York: Random House.
- Marosvári, Attila (2021). Vérengzés Apátfalván (1919. június 23–24.) Erőszak, ellenállás és megtorlás a román katonai megszállás idején. Clio kötetek. 1145 Budapest, Mexikói út 47/A. fszt. 2: Clio Intézet Nonprofit Kft. ISBN 978-615-6231-04-8. ISSN 2677-1888.
- Murber, Ibolya (2021). Nyugat-Magyarországtól Burgenlandig, 1918-1924. Budapest: BTK Történettudományi Intézet.
- Ormos, Mária (1982). Világtörténet évszámokban II. 1789-1945. Gondolat.
- Ormos, Mária (1998). Magyarország a két világháború korában, 1914-1945. Vol. 6. Csokonai Kiadó.
- Ormos, Mária (2020). Padovától Trianonig. Kossuth Kiadó.
- Ránki, György (1967). "A Clerk-misszió történetéhez" [For the Story of the Clerk mission] (PDF). Történelmi Szemle (Historical Review) (in Hungarian). 10 (2).
- Romsics, Ignác (1982). Juhász Gyula (ed.). Ellenforradalom és konszolidáció (in Hungarian). Budapest: Gondolat Könyvkiadó. p. 281. ISBN 963-281-103-8.
- Romsics, Ignác (1995). István Bethlen: A Great Conservative Statesman of Hungary, 1874-1946. Social Science Monographs. ISBN 0880333219.
- Romsics, Ignác (2004). Magyarország története a XX. században. Osiris.
- Romsics, Ignác (2020). A trianoni békeszerződés. Helikon Kiadó.
- Sakmyster, T. L. (1994). Hungary's Admiral on Horseback: Miklós Horthy, 1918-1944. East European Monographs. ISBN 9781943596263.
- Szabó, L. (1959). "Harcban Szolnokért (A magyar Vörös Hadsereg és a szolnoki munkásság hősi harca 1919-ben)". Jászkunság. 5 (1): 1–6.
- Völgyes, Iván (1971). Hungary in Revolution, 1918-19: Nine Essays. University of Nebraska Press. pp. 100–105. ISBN 0803207883.
- Zsiga, Tibor (1989). Horthy ellen, a királyért.
