= 1920 in Hungary =

- Decades: 1900s; 1910s; 1920s; 1930s; 1940s
- See also: Other events of 1920; List of years in Hungary

The following lists events in the year 1920 in Hungary.

== Incumbents ==
- Regent: Miklós Horthy (from 1 March)
- President: Károly Huszár (until 1 March)
- Prime Minister: Károly Huszár (until 15 March), Sándor Simonyi-Semadam (15 March - 19 July ), Pál Teleki (from 19 July)
- Speaker of the National Assembly: István Rakovszky (from 18 February)

== Events ==
=== January ===
- January 5 – Albert Apponyi's Hungarian delegation arrives to Paris
- January 15 – Paris Peace Conference presents peace terms to the Hungarian delegation
- January 16 – Albert Apponyi speaks in front of the Paris Peace Conference
- January 25 – 1920 Hungarian parliamentary election begin. It can't be held in Romanian occupied Tiszántúl, and Serbian occupied Baranya and Bácska

=== February ===
- February 10 – Allied Military Mission leaves Budapest
- February 25 – Romania begins withdrawal from Tiszántúl
- February 27 – Law 1920:I, the assembly will elect a provisional regent until the question of the head of state is settled

=== March ===
- Hungary begins secret negotiations with the new French government of Millerand for the re-negotiation of the Trianon borders in exchange for economic concessions to the French.
- Czechoslovak troops withdraw from (part of) Sátoraljaújhely to the Trianon border
- March 1
  - Hungary restores the Monarchy
  - Miklós Horthy elected as regent
  - French troops withdraw from Szeged
- March 15 – Simonyi-Semadam Government formed
- March 30 – Romania finishes withdrawal from Tiszántúl

=== May ===
- May 12 – Hungary presents its border proposal to the French government: they ask for all Hungarian-populated areas along the Trianon borders, referendums in the Banat and Burgenland, Carpathean Ruthenia and Eastern Slovakia for "economic reasons". The proposal was unacceptable for the French party, leading to the end of the secret negotiations.
- May 18 – Minister of the Interior Mihály Dömötör bans freemasonry by decree

=== June ===
- June 4 – Treaty of Trianon signed
- June 20 – Transport workers' unions declare an international boycott on Hungary
- June 28-30 – Legitimist paramilitaries raid Fürstenfeld for weapons
- June 31 – Prellenkirchen raided for weapons

=== July ===
- July 19 – First Teleki Government formed
- July 26 – Anti-semitic paramilitary attacks guests at Club Kávéház, kill 2 people

=== August ===
- August 1 – Hungarian uprising in Szomoróc (Somorovci)
- August 11 – Czechoslovakia and Kingdom of Serbs, Croats and Slovenes forms a collective defense arrangement against Hungary

=== September ===
- September 26 – Numerus Clausus quota passed, limiting nationalities in university admissions to their share in the population. In practice, this limits the admission of Jewish students

=== October ===
- October 20 – Order of Vitéz founded

=== November ===
- November 10 – Murder of police officer József Soltra
- November 11 – The government cracks down on far-right paramilitaries in Hotel Britannia and Ehman-telep

== Sources ==
- Bartha, Á. (2019). "Az utolsó csepp a pohárban. Soltra József rendőr meggyilkolása. Csoportosulás, lázadás és a társadalom terrorizálása". Rendészettörténeti Tanulmányok. 2: 28–44.
- Gusztáv, G. (1992). A forradalmak kora: Magyarország története: 1918-1920. Magyar Szemle Társaság.
- MacMillan, M. (2003). Paris 1919: six months that changed the world. New York: Random House.
- Murber, Ibolya (2021). Nyugat-Magyarországtól Burgenlandig, 1918-1924. Budapest: BTK Történettudományi Intézet.
- Ormos, M. (1998). Magyarország a két világháború korában, 1914-1945. Vol. 6. Csokonai Kiadó.
- Várdy, Stephen Béla (1997). Historical Dictionary of Hungary. The Scarecrow Press.
- Zsiga, Tibor (1989). Horthy ellen, a királyért.
- Map: Német-Ausztria (1918-1919)
