= 1999 in Hungary =

- Decades: 1970s; 1980s; 1990s; 2000s; 2010s
- See also: Other events of 1999; List of years in Hungary

== Incumbents ==
- President - Árpád Göncz
- Prime Minister - Viktor Orbán

== Events ==
February

- Flooding in Eastern Hungary results in extra measture to protect drinking water and facilities storing fertilizers, toxic, and hazardous materials.

=== March ===
- March 12 - Hungary joins NATO.

=== September ===
- September 30 - The 50 Fillér coin is removed from circulation

=== November ===
- November 30 - The Hortobágy National Park becomes a World Heritage Site

== Deaths ==
=== January ===
- 6 January – Lajos Tichy, 63, Hungarian footballer.
- 22 January – Gabor Carelli, 83, Hungarian classical tenor.

=== February ===
- 1 February – Rudolf Kárpáti, 78, Hungarian fencer and Olympic champion.
- 2 February – Vilmos Tátrai, 86, Hungarian classical violinist .
- 15 February – Ferenc Vozar, 53, Hungarian ice hockey player and Olympic medalist.

=== March ===
- 6 March –
  - Ferenc Kardos, 61, Hungarian film director, producer and screenwriter, heart attack.
  - János Parti, 66, Hungarian sprint canoeist and Olympic champion.

== See also ==
- List of Hungarian films since 1990
