= 1922 in Hungary =

- Decades: 1900s; 1910s; 1920s; 1930s; 1940s
- See also: Other events of 1922; List of years in Hungary

The following lists events in the year 1922 in Hungary.

== Incumbents ==
- Regent: Miklós Horthy
- Prime Minister: István Bethlen
- Speaker of the National Assembly: Gaszton Gaál (to 16 August), Béla Scitovszky (from 18 August)

== Events ==
- 2 February – Bethlen, and most of his Christian National Union Party (KNEP) joins the National Smallholders and Agricultural Labourers Party (OKGFP) and form the Christian Agricultural Labourers, Smallholders and Civic Party, commonly known as the Unity Party.
- 9 February – Szomoróc returned to Hungary (today part of Kercaszomor).
- 16 February – Horthy dissolves the National Assembly.
- 2 March – 2200 M.E. of 1922 s. decree ('Lex Bethlen') restricts voting rights from 40% to 29% and restores open voting in rural areas.
- 1 April – Charles IV dies of Influenza and Pneumonia in his Madeira exile.
- 6 April – In his Western tour, Bethlen asks for a loan from the Reparations Committee.
- 16 April – Hungary and Finland establish diplomatic relations.
- 23 April – Reparations Committee accepts loan proposal to Hungary.
- 28 May-2 June – 1922 Hungarian parliamentary election leads to the victory of the Unity Party.
- 24 June – Second West Hungarian Uprising, quickly suppressed by the government.
- 26 June – Special war powers end.
- 15 August – István Horthy joins the Order of Vitéz.
- 17 September – League of Nations returns 10 settlements to Hungary by the Austrian border.
- 18 September – Hungary joins the League of Nations.
- 26 September – Hungarian-Austrian Border Committee cedes Hagensdorf and Luising to Austria.
- 20 October – Susa (today part of Ózd) votes to stay in Hungary.
- 22 November – Austro-Hungarian Land Swap Agreement. Szentpéterfa and Ólmod to Hungary, Rattersdorf and Liebing to Austria.

== Deaths ==
- 1 January - István Kühár
- 24 March - Ödön Széchenyi
- 1 August - Donát Bánki
- 30 October - Géza Gárdonyi
