= 1921 in Hungary =

- Decades: 1900s; 1910s; 1920s; 1930s; 1940s
- See also: Other events of 1921; List of years in Hungary

The following lists events in the year 1921 in Hungary.

== Incumbents ==
- Regent: Miklós Horthy
- Prime Minister: Pál Teleki (to 14 April), István Bethlen (from 14 April)
- Speaker of the National Assembly: István Rakovszky (to 30 July), Gaszton Gaál (from 12 August)

== Events ==
=== March ===
- 14 March - Act III of 1921 passed by the National Assembly. The so-called "order law" invests powers in the government to protect the social order against communists and other radicals
- 27 March - Easter Crisis: Charles IV returns to Hungary at Szombathely
- 28 March - Easter Crisis: Charles IV negotiates with Horthy in Budapest. Horthy refuses to resign power. Charles IV returns to Szombathely.

=== April ===
- 1 April - Easter Crisis: People's Assembly supports Horthy against Charles IV
- 5 April - Easter Crisis: Charles IV leaves Hungary
- 6 April - Act III of 1921 comes into effect
- 14 April - István Bethlen replaces Pál Teleki in government
- 23 April - Romania signs alliance with Czechoslovakia

=== May ===
- 4 May - Land swap agreement between Romania and Czechoslovakia

=== June ===
- 7 June - Romania signs alliance with Kingdom of Serbs, Croats and Slovenes

=== August ===
- 6 August - Inter-Allied General Committee publishes the plan for the transfer of Burgenland from Hungary to Austria in 3 stages (A, B and C Zone).
- 9-10 August - Pact between Czechoslovakia and Austria. Czechoslovakia would support Austrian territorial claims and LoN loan, Austria denounces Habsburg restoration attempts.
- 14 August - Serbian–Hungarian Baranya–Baja Republic declared
- 21 August - Serbian–Hungarian Baranya–Baja Republic dissolved
- 22 August - Hungarian forces enter Pécs
- 26 August - Scheduled date of evacuation of Zone A, delayed by 48 hours
- 27-28 August - Uprising in West Hungary begins

=== September ===
- 7-8 September - Second Battle of Ágfalva
- 15 September - Italian foreign minister Pietro Tomasi Della Torretta begins to mediate between Austria and Hungary
- 16 September - Prónay briefly arrests Antal Lehár
- 23 September - Entente demands Hungary evacuate Zone B and C
- 29 September -
  - Gyula Gömbös writes to Prónay, asking him to take control of Zone B and C after Hungarian evacuation.
  - Ludwig III of Bavaria arrives to Sárvár where he spends his last weeks

=== October ===
- 3 October - Hungarian forces leave Zone B and C.
- 4 October - Pál Prónay declares the independent state of Lajtabánság in Burgenland
- 7 October - Austro-Hungarian negotiations begin in Venice with Italian mediation
- 13 October - Venice Agreement between Hungary and Austria
- 17-18 October - Legitimists plot a coup against Horthy in west Hungary
- 20 October - Charles IV returns to Hungary for the second time via airplane landing at Dénesfa at the Cziráky estates
- 22 October - 04:30 - Telegraph notifies the Government about Charles IV's return
- 23-24 October - Battle of Budaörs, Charles IV halted before entering Budapest
- 24 October - Czechoslovakia and Kingdom of Serbs, Croats and Slovenes issue an ultimatum to Hungary to resist and overthrow the Habsburgs, threaten military intervention.
- 25 October - II. Army of Lajtabánság under Miklós Budaházy enters the Sopron plebiscite zone with 400 men and overthrows the legitimist government.
- 27 October - 6/II Infantry Battalion replaces paramilitaries in Sopron
- 31 October - Prónay and his officers summoned to Horthy in person, ordered the evacuation of Lajtabánság by 5 November

=== November ===
- 1 November - Charles IV leaves Hungary for the last time
- 5 November - Rongyos Gárda leaves Burgenland, Lajtabánság dissolved
- 6 November - The People's Assembly dethrones the House of Habsburg-Lorraine (1921:XLVII Act)
- 11 November - Inter-Allied General Committee, after notified by Hungary that the paramilitaries were evacuated, orders Austria to take control of Burgenland, except for the Sopron plebiscite zone.
- 13-15 November - Austria takes over North Burgenland (north of Sopron)
- 19 November - Charles IV arrives to Madeira
- 25-29 November - Austria takes over Central and South Burgenland (south of Sopron)

=== December ===
- 2 December - Austrian, Hungarian and Entente authorities sign a protocol on the completed handover of Burgenland.
- 14-16 December - Sopron Plebiscite: Sopron votes to stay in Hungary
- 15-16 December - Czechoslovakia and Austria sign a pact of friendship and co-operation
- 20 December - Council of Ambassadors accepts the result of the plebiscite
- 22 December -
  - Bethlen-Peyer Pact between the Bethlen Government and the Social Democratic Party
  - 1921:LIII. Act, establishment of levente organisations
- 23 December - Amnesty for political prisoners sentenced below 5 years

== Deaths ==
- 7 March - Karl Tersztyánszky von Nádas
- 8 August - Károly Haggenmacher
- 26 August - Sándor Wekerle
- 18 October - Ludwig III of Bavaria
- 31 December - József Kiss
