= 1998 in Hungary =

- Decades: 1970s; 1980s; 1990s; 2000s; 2010s
- See also: Other events of 1998; List of years in Hungary

The following lists events in the year 1998 in Hungary.

== Incumbents ==
- President: Árpád Göncz
- Prime Minister: Gyula Horn (until 6 July), Viktor Orbán (from 6 July)
- Speaker of the National Assembly: Zoltán Gál (until 17 June), János Áder (from 18 June)

== Events ==
- In an agreement with the Jewish community on confiscated properties, the Hungarian Government makes a compensatory payment of US$2.7 million and returns nine properties.
- Over half of refugees received in Hungary in 1998 hail from Afghanistan.
- 8,572 illegal immigrants expelled in the first half of 1998 by Hungarian police.
- Hungarian Government reports 154 rapes for the first half of 1998.

=== May ===
- May 10 - First round of 1998 Hungarian parliamentary election with a 56.26% turnout.
- May 24 - Second Round of 1998 Hungarian parliamentary election with a 57.01% turnout. Fidesz wins in coalition with FKGP and MDF.

=== June ===
- June 18 - President of the Republic Arpad Göncz asks Viktor Orban to form the new Government.

=== July ===
- July 2 - Bombing in Aranykéz utca, Budapest kills 4 people
- July 6 - Viktor Orbán replaces Gyula Horn as Prime Minister of Hungary
- July 8 - The First Orbán Government is formed

=== August ===
- August 16 - The Hungarian Grand Prix is won by Michael Schumacher at the Hungaroring, Mogyoród, Pest

=== September ===
- September 30 - Klaus Naumann, Chair of the NATO Military Committee visits Hungary

=== October ===
- October 18 - Local elections in Hungary

== Deaths ==
- January 4 - Mihály Iglói
- January 25 - Attila Zoller, 70, Hungary-American jazz guitarist.
- January 27 - Miklos Udvardy, 78, Hungarian biologist and biogeographer.
- February 17 - Albert Wass, 90, Hungarian nobleman, novelist and poet, suicide.
- June 17 - Gyula László
- August 15 - Károly Polinszky
- November 6 - István Szőts
- December 21 - Béla Szőkefalvi-Nagy

== See also ==
- List of Hungarian films since 1990
