= 1918 in Hungary =

- Decades: 1890s; 1900s; 1910s; 1920s; 1930s
- See also: Other events of 1918; List of years in Hungary

The following lists events in the year 1918 in Hungary.

== Incumbents ==
- King: Charles IV (until November 13/16)
- Homo regius: Archduke Joseph August (October 26 – November 16)
- President: Mihály Károlyi (from November 16)
- Prime minister: Sándor Wekerle (until 30 October), János Hadik (October 30–31), Mihály Károlyi (from October 31)
- Speaker of the House of Representatives: Károly Szász (until November 16)
- Speaker of the House of Magnates: Endre Hadik-Barkóczy (until June 22), Gyula Wlassics (June 22 – November 16)

== Events ==
=== January ===
- January 5 – Lloyd George claims the dissolution of Austria-Hungary is not their war aim
- January 6 – Czech representatives of the Imperial Diet call for a unified Czechoslovakia
- January 8 – Wilson's 14 Points, demands "The people of Austria-Hungary, whose place among the nations we wish to see safeguarded and assured, should be accorded the freest opportunity to autonomous development"; Hungarian papers publish it on January 10
- January 12 – Galileo Circle is banned
- January 18–25 – General strike in Austria-Hungary
- January 19 – 89th Common Infantry Regiment mutinies

=== February ===
- February 1–3 – Cattaro Mutiny
- February 9 – Treaty of Brest-Litovsk between Central Powers and Ukrainian People's Republic

=== March ===
- March 3 – Treaty of Brest-Litovsk between Central Powers and Soviet Russia
- March 24 – Béla Kun establishes the Hungarian section inside the Russian Communist Party

=== April ===
- April 8–10 – Congress of Oppressed Nationalities of the Austro-Hungarian Empire held in Rome

=== May ===
- May 7 – Treaty of Bucharest: Romania signs a separate peace with the Central Powers

=== June ===
- June 1 – First report of Spanish flu in Budapest newspapers
- June 10 – SMS Szent István is sunk
- June 15–23 – Second Battle of the Piave River: Entente defeats Austro-Hungarian offensive in Italy
- June 29 – France recognizes Czechoslovakia

=== July ===
- July 3 – First case of Spanish flu reported in Hungary

=== August ===
- August 5 – Hunger riots in Cegléd, 300 women arrested
- August 9 – British foreign minister Balfour recognizes Czechoslovakia as an allied nation

=== September ===
- September 2 – US recognizes Czechoslovakia
- September 8 – Mihály Károlyi publishes an open letter, claiming the war cannot be won, and urges for a peace agreement.
- September 11 – Electoral law Article XVII of 1918 ('Lex Vázsonyi') gains royal assent. The franchise is expanded from 10 to 15%.
- September 15 – Vardar offensive begins
- September 20–21 – István Tisza visits Sarajevo

=== October ===
- October 4 – Common Foreign Minister Burián asks for peace by Wilsonian principles
- October 5–8 – Slovenian-Croatian-Serbian National Council established in Zagreb
- October 16
  - Charles IV published the Völkermanifest
  - János Lékai attempts to assassinate István Tisza
- October 17 – Austro-Hungarian compromise abolished, István Tisza declares the war lost
- October 18 – Alexandru Vaida-Voevod's speech in front of the Hungarian Parliament, demands self-determination for Romanians in Hungary
- October 19 – Ferdiš Juriga, Slovak representative speaks in Parliament for Slovak self-determination
- October 21 –
  - Cisleithanian Germans declare independence
  - Wilson answers to Austro-Hungarian peace offer, claiming that with the recognition of Czechoslovakia, peace on the basis of the 14 points is no longer sufficient, demands the recognition of a Czechoslovak and Yugoslav state
- October 22 - István Tisza dissolves the National Party of Work
- October 23
  - The last session of Parliament before the revolution
  - Prime Minister Sándor Wekerle resigns
  - Hungarian National Council formed at midnight
- October 24 – November 4 – Battle of Vittorio Veneto, the Italian Front collapses
- October 25
  - Hungarian National Council officially declared to celebration in Budapest
  - Budapest Soldiers' Council is founded by Imre Csernyák
  - Charles IV in Gödöllő, negotiates on the formation of a new government
  - Masaryk and Gregory Zatkovich agrees Carpathian Ruthenia to join Czechoslovakia in the Philadelphia Agreement
- October 26
  - The Budapest press defies censorship by publishing the program of the Hungarian National Council
  - Charles IV returns to Vienna
  - Refusing to nominate Károlyi as Prime Minister, Archduke Joseph August is named Homo Regius
  - Slovak National Council established
- October 27
  - Soldiers' Council negotiates with unions, plotting an insurrection scheduled November 4
  - Common foreign minister Gyula Andrássy accepts armistice on Entente terms, thereby indirectly recognizing Czechoslovak and Yugoslav independence
- October 28
  - Battle of Chain Bridge
  - Czechoslovakia declares independence
  - Army of the Danube (AD) is separated from the Armée d'Orient advancing northwards. It is tasked to operate in Romania and the Crimea, led by Henri Mathias Berthelot.
- October 29
  - State of Slovenes, Croats and Serbs declared in Zagreb
  - Hungarian administration flees Fiume
  - Charles IV appoints János Hadik as Prime Minister
  - Police in Budapest defects to the National Council
- October 30
  - Slovak National Council declares independence in Turócszentmárton (St. Martin)
  - 10:00: Third Wekerle Government dissolved, János Hadik takes his oath, starts to work on assembling his government
  - Protests in Budapest escalate into the Aster Revolution
  - Miklós Horthy ordered to hand over the Austro-Hungarian fleet
- October 31
  - 3:00: János Hadik resigns his office
  - 16:45 The last Austro-Hungarian warship, the SMS Viribus Unitis is handed over to the State of Slovenes, Croats and Serbs, dissolving the Austro-Hungarian fleet
  - 18:00 István Tisza is assassinated by disgruntled soldiers in his Budapest villa
  - Mihály Károlyi becomes Prime Minister of Hungary, takes oath to Charles IV, assembles his cabinet

=== November ===
- November 1
  - Banat Republic declared
  - West Ukrainian People's Republic declared
  - Mihály Károlyi's government established
  - Károlyi is relieved of his oath to Charles IV
  - The Hungarian government takes a new oath to the National Council
- November 2
  - Officers swear an oath to the Hungarian National Council
  - Minister of Defense Béla Linder's famous line "I never want to see a soldier again!"
  - Budapest Workers' Council established
  - Czechoslovak forces enter Hungary at Holics (now Holíč)
- November 3 – Armistice of Villa Giusti, comes into effect next day from 15:00
- November 4 –
  - Jiu Valley National Council established in Petrozsény (now Petroșani)
  - Hungarian Party of Communists established in Moscow by Béla Kun's circle, in the following month about 200 of them return to Hungary
- November 5 – US Foreign Minister Lansing recognizes Romanian claim to Transylvania
- November 7
  - Károlyi government begins armistice negotiations in Belgrade
  - Czechs enter Nagyszombat (now Trnava)
- November 8
  - Linder is replaced by Bartha as defense minister
  - Deserters (mostly Romanian) besiege the Urmánczy mansion in Jósikafalva (Beliș). Nándor Urmánczy recruits a private detachment and crushes the rioters, shoots 20 prisoners
- November 9
  - Entente forces enter Újvidék (now Novi Sad)
  - Székely National Council in Budapest
  - Ruthenian National Council led by Oreszt Szabó declares for Hungary
- November 10 – Romania declares war on Germany, re-entering the war a day before it ends
- November 12
  - Entente forces occupy Temesvár (now Timișoara)
  - Romanian invasion of Transylvania begins at Gyergyótölgyes (now Tulgheș)
  - Mackensen's occupying German Army begins to withdraw from Romania via Hungary, crossing into Hungary at Surduc Pass
- November 13
  - Armistice of Belgrade signed
  - Eckartsau Letter: King Charles IV withdraws from all state affairs and recognizes Hungary's future form of government
  - Oszkár Jászi negotiates with the Romanian National Council in Arad (to November 14)
  - Viktor Heltai's National Guard squad is removed from Budapest to relieve Czech attacks around Pozsony (now Bratislava). Nagyszombat (now Trnava) is recaptured.
- November 15
  - Hungarian National Defense Association (MOVE) founded
  - Entente forces enter Pécs
  - Hungarian counter-attacks re-capture Turócszentmárton (now Martin)
- November 16
  - Both Houses of the Parliament dissolve themselves - the National Council acts as provisional legislature
  - Hungary declared a republic ("First Republic"), Károlyi becomes provisional head of state
  - Hungarian counter-attacks re-capture Zsolna (now Žilina)
- November 17
  - Béla Kun returns to Hungary
  - General meeting of the Székely National Council, proposal for a Székely Republic
  - Franchet d'Esperey allows Romania to advance to the Belgrade Armistice line
- November 18 – German-Austria declares its territorial demands for the German-inhabited areas of Pozsony, Moson, Sopron, and Vas counties; in response, Hungary decides to cease food shipments
- November 19 – Ruthenian National Council issues a memorandum to Oszkár Jászi
- November 20 – Romanian National Council in Arad demands total independence
- November 21 – Austrian Foreign Minister Otto Bauer and Hungarian foreign secretary József Diner-Dénes agree to resume Hungarian food shipments in exchange for ceasing pro-Austrian agitation in Western Hungary
- November 22 – Law 41/1918 in German Austria re-affirms Austrian territorial claims to Western Hungary
- November 23 – No. I of 1918 People's Law expands the franchise to 50%. Universal male suffrage above 21 and female suffrage for literates above 24.
- November 24 – Hungarian Party of Communists (KMP) established
- November 25
  - Serbs of Vojvodina declare for Serbia at Újvidék (now Novi Sad)
  - Fernand Vix arrives to Budapest as the head of the Budapest Allied Military Mission to oversee a French occupation of Hungary which would never be implemented
  - Austrian-Hungarian trade agreement: Hungary provides cereals and animals in exchange for paper, medicine and industrial products
- November 26 - Gang leader Viktor Heltai is arrested
- November 28 - Székely and Transylvanian Hungarian National Assembly in Marosvásárhely (now Târgu Mureș)

=== December ===
- December 1
  - A council of Transylvanian Romanians declare union 26 counties of the Kingdom of Hungary until the Tisza river with Romania in Gyulafehérvár (now Alba Iulia)
  - State of Slovenes, Croats and Serbs unifies with Serbia
  - Székely Division established
- December 2 – Romanian troops enter Marosvásárhely (now Târgu Mureș)
- December 3 – A note by Vix demands Hungarian withdrawal from "Slovakia", but does not specify a border
- December 5–7 – Republic of Heinzenland in Burgerland
- December 6
  - Bartha-Hodža Agreement – Minister of Defense Albert Bartha and Slovak politician Milan Hodža agree on a demarcation line, which is later rejected by Czech leaders
  - Romanians enter Székelyudvarhely (now Odorheiu Secuiesc)
- December 7 – First issue of KMP's newspaper Vörös Újság published
- December 8 – István Apáthy named High Government Commissioner for Eastern Hungary
- December 9 – During the assembly of the Upper Hungarian German National Council seated in Késmárk (now Kežmarok), the plan for establishing an independent Zipser ('Spiš') Republic was presented. However, the republic was never proclaimed.
- December 10 – First French troops arrive to Szeged; they are reinforced by the 157th Inf. Regiment on December 30, and the 210th Inf. Regiment on January 3, 1919
- December 11 – Slovak People's Republic declared
- December 12 – Protest by the Soldiers' Council forces defense minister Albert Bartha to resign. Minister of the Interior Tivadar Batthyány also resigns, replaced by Vince Nagy. With that, the overall balance of the Károlyi government shifts leftwards. Károlyi himself fills the defense position provisionally, alongside Vilmos Böhm.
- December 15 – Romanian troops cross the Belgrade armistice line
- December 16 – Mackansen arrested in Budapest
- December 17 – Czechs enter Késmárk (now Kežmarok)
- December 19 – Dissatisfied with the Bartha-Hodža Agreement, a new demarcation line is drafted by Clemenceau
- December 21 –
  - French foreign minister Stephen Pichon approves the new demarcation line between the Hungarian and Czechoslovak forces, forwarded to Vix
  - Law No. 10 on Ruthenian autonomy
- December 22 –
  - Council of Transylvanian Hungarians in Kolozsvár (now Cluj) against Romanian occupation
  - Sándor Juhász Nagy replaces Márton Lovászy as Minister of Religion and Education
- December 23 – A note by Vix declares the new demarcation line in regarding Upper Hungary (Pichon Line)
- December 24 – Romanian forces enter Kolozsvár (now Cluj)
- December 25 –
  - Yugoslav forces occupy Muraköz (Međimurje)
  - Autonomous Rus'ka Krajina declared based on Law No. 10
- December 29 –
  - Czech forces enter Kassa (now Košice), Slovak People's Republic dissolved
  - Böhm is replaced as defense minister by Sándor Festetics
- December 30 – French troops (1st African Chasseur Regiment) occupy Arad
- December 31 – Berthelot-Apáthy agreement establishes a 15 km neutral zone in Transylvania, Romanians overstep it

== Deaths ==
- February 16 – Károly Khuen-Héderváry
- October 31 – István Tisza
- December 1 – Margit Kaffka

== Bibliography ==
- Ablonczy, Balázs (2020). Ismeretlen Trianon. Az összeomlás és a békeszerződés.
- Borsányi, Gy. (1988). Októbertől márciusig. Kossuth Könyvkiadó.
- Breitt, J. (1925). A magyarországi 1918/19. évi forradalmi mozgalmak és a vörös háború története.
- Demkó, A. (2020). Napról napra Trianon - 1918-1924. Gyulai, G. Reakció Kiadó Kft.
- Gulyás, László (2021). A Magyar Királyság román megszállásának szakaszai, különös tekintettel a Partium és a Tiszántúl elfoglalására. Lokális Trianon 1. : Csongrád, Csanád és Torontál vármegye az összeomlás éveiben 1918–1920. Vol. 28. pp. 27–41.
- Gusztáv, G. (1992). A forradalmak kora: Magyarország története: 1918-1920. Magyar Szemle Társaság.
- Hatos, Pál (2018). Az elátkozott köztársaság: az 1918-as összeomlás és az őszirózsás forradalom története.
- Juhász, Gyula (1976). Magyarország története 8/1-2: 1918-1919/1919-1945. Pach, Z. P., Ránki, G., Hajdu, T., Berend, T. I., & Tilkovszky, L. Budapest.
- Murber, Ibolya (2021). Nyugat-Magyarországtól Burgenlandig, 1918-1924. Budapest: BTK Történettudományi Intézet.
- Ormos, Mária (1982). Világtörténet évszámokban II. 1789-1945. Gondolat.
- Ormos, Mária (1998). Magyarország a két világháború korában, 1914-1945. Vol. 6. Csokonai Kiadó.
- Romsics, I. (2004). Magyarország története a XX. században. Osiris.
- Schuller, Balázs (2005). "Impériumváltás a Zsil-völgyében". Bányászati és Kohászati Lapok (3): 35–38.
- Suba, J. (2018). "Demarkációs vonalak Felvidéken, 1918: (kartográfia-elemzés)= Lines of demarcation in Upper-Hungary, 1918". Közép-Európai Közlemények. 11 (1): 107–125.
- Sztancs, G. (2018). "Selbständige Zipser Republik". Fórum Társadalomtudományi Szemle. 20 (4): 21–42.
- Völgyes, Iván (1971). Hungary in Revolution, 1918-19: Nine Essays. University of Nebraska Press. pp. 100–105. ISBN 0803207883.
