= 1993 in Hungary =

- Decades: 1970s; 1980s; 1990s; 2000s; 2010s
- See also: Other events of 1993; List of years in Hungary

== Incumbents ==
- President - Árpád Göncz
- Prime Minister - József Antall (until 12 December), Péter Boross (starting 12 December)

== Events ==
=== March ===
- March 20 – The 1993 World Short Track Speed Skating Team Championships are held in Budapest, featuring 69 competitors from 9 nations.

=== April ===
- April 3 – Hungary's first attempt to enter the Eurovision Song Contest ends in failure, as Andrea Szulák fails to win a place in the final rounds.

=== May ===
- May 3-6 – Queen Elizabeth II visits Hungary; she addresses the parliament and promotes the democratic transition.

=== August ===
- August 15 – The Hungarian Grand Prix is held at the Hungaroring in Budapest and is won by Damon Hill.

=== October ===
- October 22 – Parliament adopts Act XC of 1993, enabling the prosecution of war crimes and crimes against humanity under the 1949 Geneva Conventions.
- October 23 – The National Forces' Movement is founded through the merger of the Happiness Party and the Hungarian Republican Party.

=== December ===
- December 12 – During the children's television block Walt Disney bemutatja, MTV1 abruptly interrupts an episode of DuckTales to announce the death of Prime Minister József Antall.
- December 21 – The National Assembly elects Péter Boross as Prime Minister of Hungary following the death of József Antall on December 12.

== Births ==
- January 19 - Bence Biczó, swimmer

== Deaths ==
=== January ===
- January 6 – Judit Tóth, 86, Hungarian gymnast and Olympic medalist.
- January 23 – Gábor Péter, 86, Hungarian communist politician.
- January 31 – Ernő Lendvaï, 67, Hungarian music theorist.

=== February ===
- February – Gusztáv Bene, boxer (born 1911)

== See also ==
- List of Hungarian films since 1990
