= István Ács =

Hungarian jurist and politician (1928–2018)

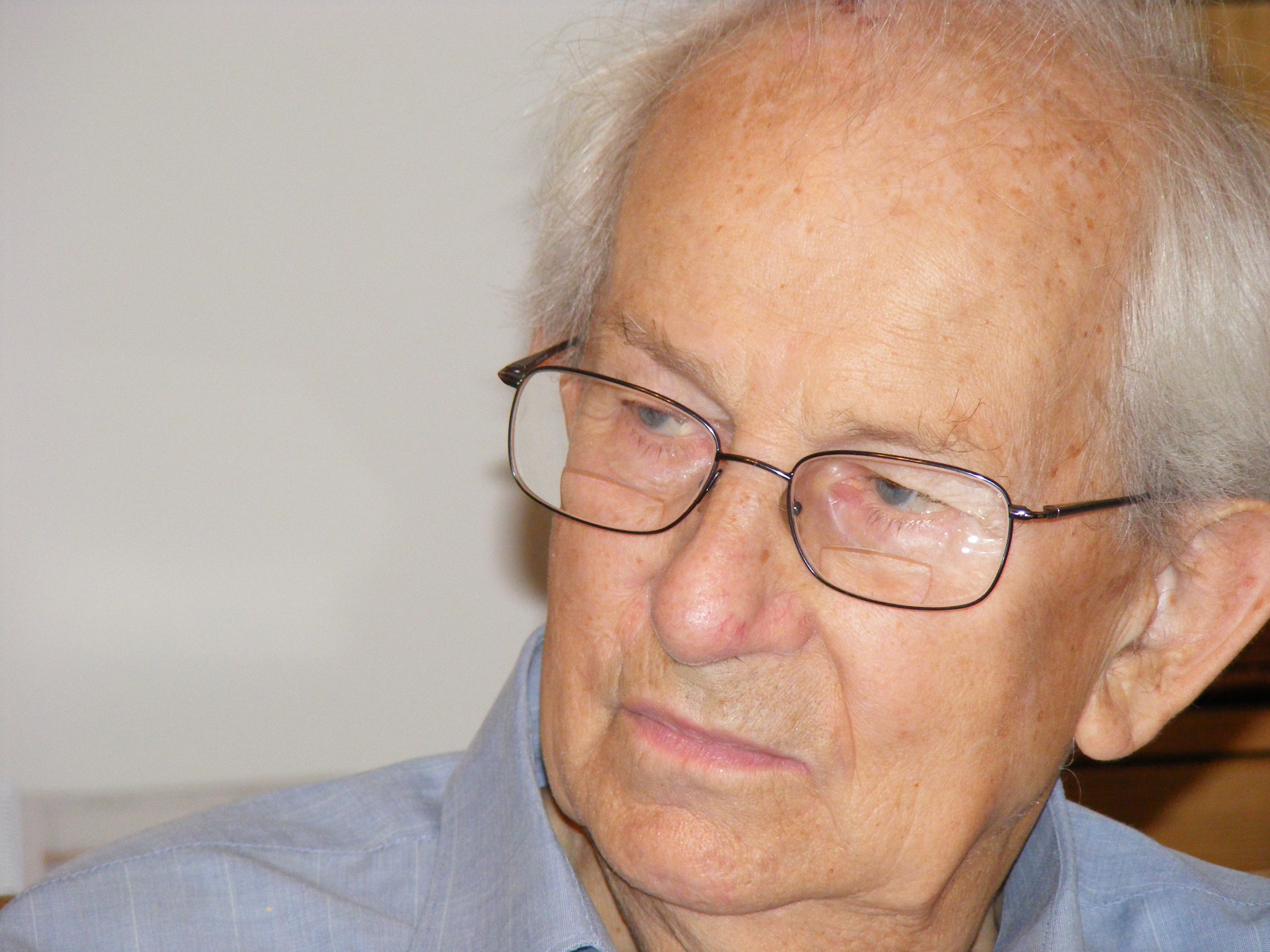
- István Ács in 2009

Chairman of the Council of Debrecen
- In office 11 October 1966 – 31 December 1989
- Preceded by: Gábor Szilágyi
- Succeeded by: József Hevessy as Mayor of Debrecen

Personal details
- Born: 18 September 1928 Nádudvar, Hungary
- Died: 22 July 2018 (aged 89) Debrecen, Hungary
- Profession: jurist, politician

Dr. István Ács (18 September 1928 – 22 July 2018) was a Hungarian jurist and politician, who served as the last Chairman of the Council of Debrecen between 11 October 1966 and 31 December 1989.

Political offices
Preceded by Gábor Szilágyi	Chairman of the Council of Debrecen; 1966–1989	Succeeded by József Hevessy
