= József Faddi =

Hungarian politician and agronomist (1920–1992)

Member of the National Assembly
- In office 2 May 1990 – 4 August 1992

Personal details
- Born: 1920
- Died: 4 August 1992 (aged 71–72)
- Party: FKGP
- Profession: agronomist, politician

József Faddi (1920 – 4 August 1992) was a Hungarian agronomist and politician, member of the National Assembly (MP) for Kunszentmiklós (Bács-Kiskun County Constituency IV) between 1990 and 1992.

== Biography ==
He was born into a farmer family. He joined the Independent Smallholders, Agrarian Workers and Civic Party (FKGP) and the Hungarian Peasant Alliance in 1945. He participated in the reorganization of the FKGP during the Hungarian Revolution of 1956.

Faddi secured a mandate in the first democratic parliamentary election in 1990. He was a member of the Committee on Budget, Tax and Finance from 12 June 1990. He died on 4 August 1992. He was replaced by Tamás Gábor Nagy on 3 May 1993 after winning the by-election in Kunszentmiklós and its area.
