= József Hevessy =

Hungarian politician

Mayor of Debrecen
- In office 1990 – 18 October 1998
- Preceded by: István Ács as Chairman of the Council
- Succeeded by: Lajos Kósa

Personal details
- Born: 10 October 1931 Hámor, Hungary (today part of Miskolc)
- Died: 18 July 2005 (aged 73) Debrecen, Hungary
- Party: SZDSZ (since 1988)
- Profession: politician

Dr. József Hevessy (10 October 1931 – 18 July 2005) was a Hungarian politician, who served as Mayor of Debrecen from 1990 to 1998.

Political offices
| Preceded by István Ács | Mayor of Debrecen; 1990–1998 | Succeeded by Lajos Kósa |
