= Lajos Kósa =

Hungarian politician

Lajos Kósa MP
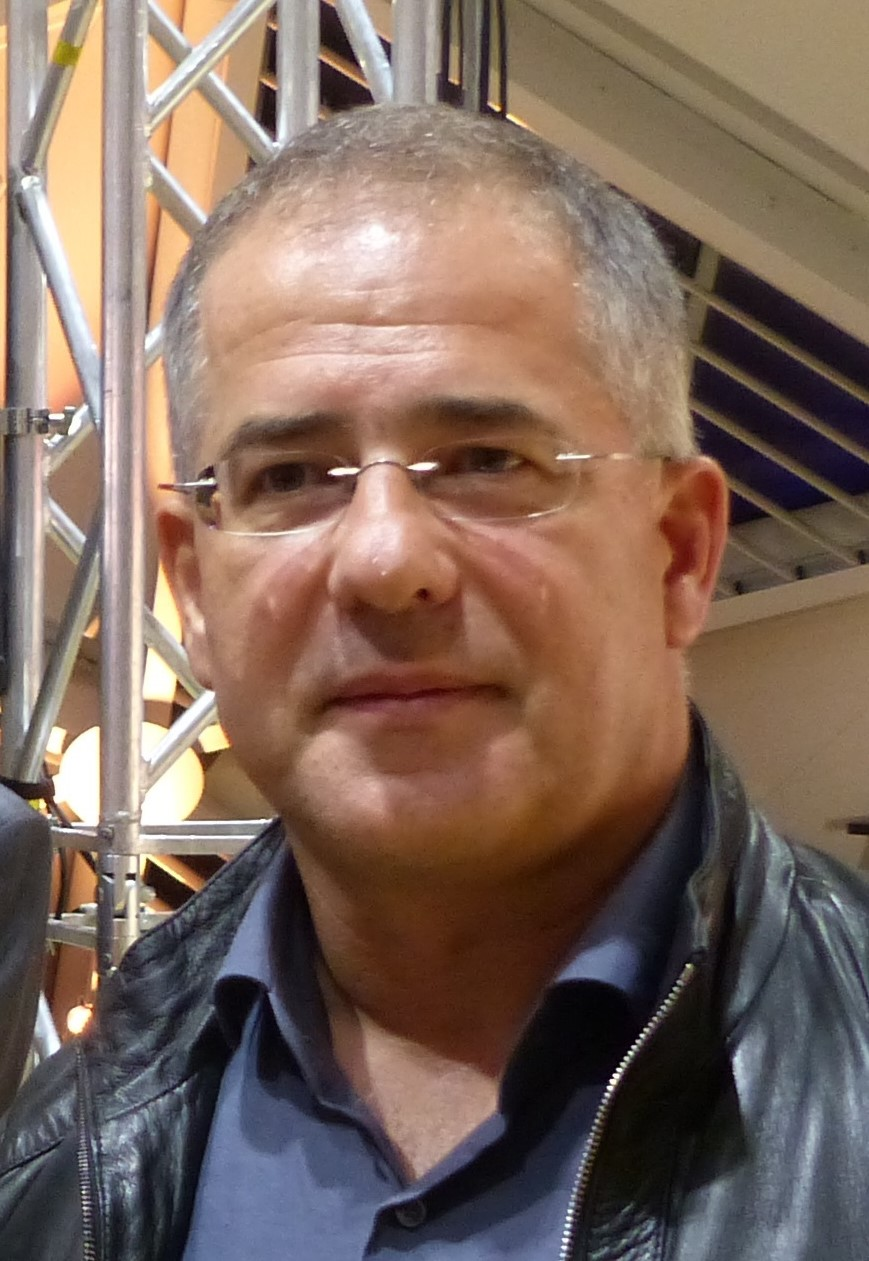

Minister without Portfolio for the development of towns with county rights
- In office 2 October 2017 – 18 May 2018
- Prime Minister: Viktor Orbán

Leader of the Fidesz parliamentary group
- In office 1 October 2015 – 1 October 2017
- Preceded by: Antal Rogán
- Succeeded by: Gergely Gulyás

Mayor of Debrecen
- In office 18 October 1998 – 12 October 2014
- Preceded by: József Hevessy
- Succeeded by: László Papp

Member of the National Assembly
- In office 2 May 1990 – 8 May 2026

First Vice-President of the Fidesz party
- In office 13 May 2010 – 13 December 2015

Personal details
- Born: 14 March 1964 (age 62) Debrecen, Hungary
- Party: Fidesz
- Spouse: Gyöngyi Porkoláb
- Children: Anna; Eszter; Lilla; Levente
- Profession: politician

Lajos Kósa (born 14 March 1964) is a Hungarian politician, who served as Mayor of Debrecen between 1998 and 2014. He was a Member of Parliament from 1990 to 2026.

Kósa was appointed one of the four Vice Presidents of the Fidesz party in 2007, alongside Ildikó Pelczné Gáll, Zoltán Pokorni and Mihály Varga. He also secured an individual mandate during the parliamentary election in 2010. He retained his membership of the Local Government and Urban Development Committee. He was nominated First or Managing Vice President of Fidesz, after Party President Viktor Orbán was appointed Prime Minister of Hungary on 14 May 2010.

He was appointed leader of the Fidesz parliamentary group on 1 October 2015. He became minister without portfolio responsible for the Modern Cities Program on 2 October 2017, holding the position until 18 May 2018.

A huge scandal broke out in March 2018 involving Lajos Kósa and 4,3 billion euros.

In November 2021 Mr. Kósa was the first Hungarian senior official who acknowledged that the country's Interior Ministry purchased and used military-grade spyware Pegasus. Government of Viktor Orbán is accused of using it to spy on members of media as well as Hungarian opposition.

== Personal life ==
He is married. His wife is Gyöngyi Porkoláb. They have four children - three daughters, Anna, Eszter and Lilla and a son, Levente.

== See also ==
- Overtime law, known as the "slave law"

Political offices
Preceded by József Hevessy	Mayor of Debrecen; 1998–2014	Succeeded by László Papp
National Assembly of Hungary
Preceded by Antal Rogán	Leader of the Fidesz parliamentary group 2015–2017	Succeeded by Gergely Gulyás
