= 2004 Hungarian dual citizenship referendum =

Nation-wide two-question referendum

On December 5, 2004, a national referendum was held in Hungary on two questions. The referendum was originally called only in connection with the privatization of hospitals, at the initiative of the Workers’ Party. After the successful completion of the signature collection campaign of the World Federation of Hungarians (MVSZ), another question was added, calling for the adoption of a law enabling preferential naturalization for those who identified themselves as Hungarian by nationality but were not living in Hungary and were not Hungarian citizens.

Ferenc Mádl set December 5, 2004, as the date for the binding national referendum on the two questions, the results of which would have been mandatory for the National Assembly. The vote sparked lively public debate, with numerous social and professional organizations joining the campaign. However, in both cases the referendum was invalid due to low turnout. While the failed vote had no consequences for the healthcare sector, it placed a long-term strain on the relationship between Hungarian politics and Hungarians living beyond the country’s borders.

== Referendum on the privatization of hospitals ==
=== Background ===
The financing of healthcare increasingly became a burden for the Hungarian government in the 1990s. A growing share of tax revenues had to be allocated to the operation of the system, while dissatisfaction also grew due to the declining quality of care and the deteriorating state of infrastructure.

From the second half of the 1990s, successive governments considered the involvement of private capital in hospital operations as a possible way out of this deadlock. In 2001, the National Assembly adopted the first law allowing the privatization of hospitals. However, the Constitutional Court annulled this law in 2002. Following the Constitutional Court’s decision, the government still explored opportunities for privatization, but this provoked resistance from those who considered continued state involvement necessary.

In 2003, the government of Péter Medgyessy submitted a bill to the National Assembly that would have allowed the involvement of private capital as a minority owner in healthcare operations under certain conditions. In the wake of the public debate surrounding the privatization of the healthcare system, the Workers’ Party initiated a binding referendum on the issue in 2003.

On December 15, 2003, the Constitutional Court annulled the law enabling privatization, but the Workers’ Party continued its signature collection campaign. The signatures submitted were certified by the National Election Committee (OVB). On May 17, 2004, the National Assembly ordered that a referendum be held. The governing MSZP and SZDSZ also turned to the Constitutional Court in an attempt to prevent the referendum. Due to the summer recess, the Constitutional Court only approved the earlier parliamentary resolution on September 28.

President Ferenc Mádl set December 5, 2004, as the date for the referendum on the privatization of hospitals.

=== Campaign ===
The political parties had very different attitudes toward the possibility of hospital privatization. By the end of the referendum campaign, the issue of hospital privatization had somewhat receded into the background, with the political struggle focusing primarily on the question of dual citizenship. Unlike earlier referendum campaigns, this time a very heated political battle emerged, into which mainly the two largest parties dominating Parliament (Fidesz and MSZP) threw themselves, while the opinions of other parties receded.

==== Fidesz ====
At the beginning of the campaign, Fidesz highlighted its own referendum initiative aimed at halting privatization in all areas of governance. The right-wing party repeatedly expressed its incomprehension that the government, contrary to the practice of other EU member states, saw privatization as the solution. Viktor Orbán stated to journalists that the government was pursuing hospital privatization not with the intention of improving the system, but out of self-interest. The core message of Fidesz’s campaign was that healthcare is such an important social issue that it must be protected from profit-oriented service providers seeking to exploit it on a market basis. This was reflected in the party’s referendum slogan: Health is not a business!

==== MDF ====
The Hungarian Democratic Forum (MDF) initially tried to distance itself from the campaign surrounding privatization. In their view, it was pointless and wasteful to hold a referendum on repealing a law that did not exist. In the second phase of the campaign, however, opposing Fidesz, they supported privatization and called on voters to cast a “no” vote, while also emphasizing the responsibility of the state. The party’s stance, however, was not unified; some local organizations urged adopting a joint position with Fidesz.

==== MSZP ====
The official position of the Hungarian Socialist Party (MSZP) was formulated after a speech given by Prime Minister Ferenc Gyurcsány on November 2. At that time, the prime minister expressed support for the possibility of privatization and called on MPs to vote “no.” Fearing a possible majority of “yes” votes, the government launched an informational campaign, to help people realize halting privatization would be costly. During the campaign, MSZP regularly referred to the fact that Viktor Orbán, during his time as prime minister, had spoken favorably about hospital privatization, and that Fidesz had become the strategic ally of the Workers’ Party, which openly declared itself communist. In MSZP’s view, free healthcare was a constitutional right that would not be curtailed if private companies took over hospital operations. A victory of the “yes” vote, according to MSZP, would jeopardize this possibility. The left-wing party presented its arguments in a publication entitled The Responsible Decision! On the Thursday before the vote, Ferenc Gyurcsány, speaking on the television program Napkelte, accused Fidesz of social demagogy and of abandoning the modernist traditions of conservatism.

==== SZDSZ ====
Unlike Fidesz, the Alliance of Free Democrats (SZDSZ) presented the involvement of private capital as the only viable path for healthcare. SZDSZ accused Fidesz of demagogy and spreading misconceptions, while campaigning for “no” by emphasizing the positive effects of privatization.

=== Results ===
Voter turnout at the national level reached only 37.49%, which was below the pre-election expectations of 45–50% anticipated during the week before the referendum.[19] Participation only approached 50% in Budapest, while in the counties of Transdanubia it was around 37%, and in the eastern counties approximately 30%.

Opinion polls also overestimated the expected victory of “yes” votes, as researchers found that 73% of the population opposed hospital privatization.

== Questions ==
Voters were asked two questions:

Hungarian text	English translation
Egyetért-e Ön azzal, hogy az egészségügyi közszolgáltató intézmények, kórházak maradjanak állami, önkormányzati tulajdonban, ezért az Országgyűlés semmisítse meg az ezzel ellentétes törvényt?	Do you agree with the notion that public health service institutions and hospitals should remain state or local government property, and, in accordance with that, the Parliament should repeal the contradictory law?
Akarja-e, hogy az Országgyűlés törvényt alkosson arról, hogy kedvezményes honosítással – kérelmére – magyar állampolgárságot kapjon az a magát magyar nemzetiségűnek valló, nem Magyarországon lakó, nem magyar állampolgár, aki magyar nemzetiségét a 2001. évi LXII. törvény 19. paragrafusa szerinti magyarigazolvánnyal vagy a megalkotandó törvényben meghatározott egyéb módon igazolja?	Do you want the Parliament to pass a law that enables ethnic Hungarians with non-Hungarian citizenship and residence, who affirm their Hungarian nationality, either with a Hungarian identity card described in Par. 19 of Act LXII/2001, or in a way specified in the forthcoming law, to apply for and be granted Hungarian citizenship?

Both measures were approved by voters, but the referendum failed due to a voter turnout of 37.5%.

== Results ==
Results of Question I by county

=== Question I ===
Choice	Votes	%
For	1,922,765	65.0
Against	1,034,578	35.0
Invalid/blank votes	53,629	–
Total	3,010,972	100
Registered voters/turnout	8,048,737	37.5
Source: Nohlen & Stöver

Results of Question II by county

=== Question II ===
Choice	Votes	%
For	1,521,143	51.6
Against	1,428,736	48.4
Invalid/blank votes	61,093	–
Total	3,010,972	100
Registered voters/turnout	8,048,737	37.5
Source: Nohlen & Stöver
