= Miklós Borz =

Hungarian soldier and politician

Member of the National Assembly
- In office 2 May 1990 – 30 July 1992

Personal details
- Born: 1921
- Died: 30 July 1992 (aged 70–71)
- Party: FKGP
- Profession: soldier, politician

Military service
- Allegiance: Kingdom of Hungary
- Branch/service: Hungarian Royal Army
- Years of service: 1944–1945
- Rank: Lieutenant
- Battles/wars: World War II

Miklós Borz (1921 – 30 July 1992) was a Hungarian soldier and politician, member of the National Assembly (MP) from FKGP Pest County Regional List between 1990 and 1992.

== Biography ==
Miklós Borz was born into an educator family in 1921. He finished his secondary studies in the Benedictine Grammar School in Esztergom. After that, he attended the Ludovica Military Academy. He was promoted to Lieutenant in 1944. He fought in the Second World War, and was seriously injured in Christmas 1944. He was captured by the American Army in 1945. After returning to home, his name was added to the "B-list". After that, he worked as a retailer, laborer then driver. He participated in the Hungarian Revolution of 1956. He was appointed a Chairman of a Workers' Council as a result he was fired from his job in 1958. He worked as an insurance agent until 1963.

He rejoined the FKGP in 1988. Borz secured a mandate in the first democratic parliamentary election in 1990. He was a member of the Committee on Defence since 3 May 1990. He died on 30 July 1992. He was replaced by Mihály Izsó on 6 October 1992.
