= Battle of Salgótarján =

1919, Czechoslovak-Hungarian War

- Part of the Hungarian–Czechoslovak War
Date	30 April – 30 May 1919
Location	around Salgótarján
Result	Hungarian victory: Czechslovak offensive repulsed; Beginning of the Northern Campaign

Belligerents
Hungarian Soviet Republic	Czechoslovakia; Supported by: Italy

Commanders and leaders
Béla Kun; Vilmos Böhm; Aurél Stromfeld; Pál Radváner; György? Köller	(Czechoslovakia) Tomáš Masaryk (Czechoslovakia) Josef Štika (Kingdom of Italy) Luigi Piccione (Czechoslovakia) Litovsky

Strength
2,494 (80th Brigade)	7,000 (2nd Division)

The Battle of Salgótarján occurred in 1919 between Czechoslovak troops and the Hungarian Soviet Republic, around the coal mining city of Salgótarján.

== Background ==
At the end of World War I, the Austro-Hungarian Empire collapsed, and a multitude of National Councils were established to take power. In Budapest, the liberal establishment was overthrown in the Aster Revolution, and a coalition government of nationalists and social democrats took power, led by Mihály Károlyi. On 16 November 1918, Hungary was declared an independent republic. Meanwhile, on 30 October, the Slovak National Council issued the Martin Declaration, declaring union with the newly established Czechoslovakia.

In early November, Czech troops entered Slovakia to enforce the claim. After some clashes with local formations, the Entente powers pressured Hungary to withdraw. Over December 1918 and January 1919, Hungary handed over most of the current Slovak territory, mostly peacefully. The demarcation line between Hungary and Czechoslovakia, the so-called Pichon-line, was dictated to the Károlyi Government by Fernand Vix on 23 December. It runs on the Danube and Ipoly rivers to Rimavská Sobota (Rimaszombat), then follows a straight line to the Uzh river. This line is only slightly different to the permanent border dictated in the 12 June Note, and then the Treaty of Trianon.

This border fell short of the Czechoslovak proposal, presented to the Paris Peace Conference on February 5, 1919, which claimed the North Hungarian Mountains including the industrial city of Miskolc, the vital rail connection via Balassagyarmat, and the coal mining city of Salgótarján.

In Hungary, further entente territorial demands caused the collapse of the Károlyi regime and a coalition of communists and social democrats took power. They declared the dictatorship of the proletariat and the Hungarian Soviet Republic. The new soviet government rejected entente demands. After further negotiations by Jan Smuts failed, Romania launched a military intervention on 16 April. The newly formed Red Army collapsed, and fled beyond the river Tisza. Seeing Hungarian weakness, on April 27, Czechoslovakia joined the intervention against Soviet Hungary.

== Battle ==
The Czechoslovak attack begun towards Carpathean Ruthenia on 27 April. In the following days, the whole front east of the Danube begun to advance. The Czechoslovak 6th Division overrun the Red Army's 5th Division and captured Miskolc on 2 May. To its west, the Czechoslovak 2nd Brigade crossed the demarcation line towards Salgótarján on 30 April. Salgótarján was defended by 80th Brigade under 3rd (previously 40th) Division. Hungarian defenders were outnumbered, further weakened by re-deployments to the Romanian front. On 28 May, the 80th Brigade was reduced to 2494 men, 24 machine guns and 4 batteries.

=== Initial Czechoslovak advance (30 April - 10 May) ===
2nd Brigade advanced in three columns. The central column advanced south from Rimavská Sobota. On the first day of the attack, 10th company defending Rimavské Janovce (Jánosi) fled to Jesenské (Feled). They were returned to position by a commissar, but next day they were ordered to withdraw to Hajnáčka (Ajnácskő) from fear of encirclement. The Czechoslovaks entered Rimavské Janovce on 2 May. This retreat opened up a gap to the east of 80th Brigade.

On 2 May, the Czechoslovak 2nd Brigade launched its full-scale attack to capture Salgótarján. On the eastern flank, Rimaszécs (Rimavská Seč) fell to Czechoslovakia on that day. On the western flank, attacks against Nagydaróc (Veľké Dravce) were initially resisted by defending 9th Company, but its numbers were depleted to just 40 men. They were forced to retreat by the evening of 2 May, after outflanked by Guszona (Husiná) To the west, there were attacks against Fülekkelecsény (Fiľakovské Kľačany) and Rapp (Rapovce). After a day of resistance, at 14:00 3 May, 3rd Battalion command ordered a retreat, which quickly turned chaotic. A new defensive line was only established at Somoskőújfalu.

To re-establish connection with Hungarian 60th Brigade to the east, 8th Company was ordered to advance to Pétervására, but they were held down at Mátranovák to train new recruits. They resumed their march on the evening of 4 May, however the company mutinied, replaced their captain and retreated back to Mátranovák by the evening of 5 May.

Division command sent 53rd Jäger Regiment from Budapest to reinforce 80th Brigade, these forces took position on 5 May. Nonetheless, due to weak reconnaissance and fear of encirclements, retreats continued the following days: On 5 May, 10th company retreated from Hidegkút-Tajti line to Zagyvaróna. Attacks also intensified on the western flank, around Szécsény. The Red Battalion and 16/2 Battalion (under the adjacent 1st Brigade) defended the city for a day, until it fell on 6 May.

That day, the Czechs sent an armored train from Losonc. It was repulsed by Hungary's 8th armored train and Battery 68/2 between Ragyolc (Radzovce) and Somoskőújfalu around 17:00. Soon after it resumed attack, at which point the Hungarians successfully disabled it.

The Czech advance was finally halted on 7 May, when a Czechoslovak attack from Lapujtő towards Karancsalja was repulsed by 6th and 12th companies. However, on the same day, Karancs Hill (also known as Hill 729 or 727) overlooking the city of Salgótarján fell to Czechoslovak forces. After two days of unsuccessful counter-charges, it was recaptured on 10 May by Battalion 53/II and a miners' company.

=== 6th Division counter-attacks (9 - 13 May) ===
On 5 May, Böhm himself advised on abandoning Salgótarján, but Kun and Szántó insisted on holding out. To remedy the situation, 6th Division was sent to relieve the city arriving at 9 PM on 7 May. In the following days, it prepared for offensive operations. 80th Brigade commander Pál Radváner was replaced by Köllner. Battalions 46/1 and 46/2 were sent to re-inforce 80th Brigade, while Battalion 46/3 was sent to hold the right flank at Pétervására. On 9 May, Czech forces occupied the Szécsény - Endrefalva - Piliny - Karancskeszi - Karancs Hill (729) - Somoskő - Cered - Pogony - Monosbél Line.

Recognizing the deployment of 6th division, Czechoslovak forces changed tactics. They halted their main advance at Somoskőújfalu, instead focusing on the flanks.

However the reinforced western flanks repulsed their attacks against Nógrádmegyer and Ságújfalu and pushed back to the Pösténypuszta-Ludányhalászi-Endrefalva line by the end of 9 May, then re-captured Szécsény on 10 May. The same day, as Karancs Hill is re-captured by Hungarians, the Czech forces rout in fear of encirclement, and Hungarians capture part of Somoskőújfalu. After a Czechoslovak attack on Medves Hill was repulsed on the morning of 11 May, Hungarians went on the offensive. By the end of the day, 80th Brigade advanced in the valley to Ragyonc and Fülekpüspöki, on the left flank 46/6th Jäger Battalion captured Karancsberény, while on the right flank 46/3rd Battalion reached Almány. On 12 May, after one last Czechoslovak counter-charge, 80th Brigade entered Fülek. By 13 May, the Czechs were pushed back to the Ipoly river and the Ipolynyitra-Mojín-Feled-Rimasimonyi-Borsodnádasd line.

=== Flanking attempt from the east - Battle of Kisterenye (15 - 30 May) ===
However, soviet command suspected a French offensive from the south around 12 May, which would never actually occur. To counter this threat, 4th and 6th division were re-deployed to the Kecskemét area, leaving Salgótarján under-defended once more. Once the Hungarian attack halted, Czechoslovak forces dug into strong defensive positions. Between 15 and 18 May, 5th Jäger Battalion replaced 6th Jäger Battalion, and 53/1-2nd Battalions replaced 46/2-3rd Battalions on the front line. Their transport was still in process, when the new Czechoslovak attack hit.

To the east of Salgótarján, Luigi Piccione's 6th Division held the area around Miskolc, defending against the Red Army's 3rd Corps. On 13 May, he was ordered to outflank Salgótarján from the east. 6 battalions concentrated at Járdányháza and Borsodnádasd would advance towards Pétervására and Kisterenye (today part of Bátonyterenye), cutting off the main road between connection to Salgótarján. Simultaneously, 4th Brigade around Bátka and Rimaszécs would resume its advance with 6 battalions and 2 batteries, on the Feled-Ajnácskő-Tajti-Salgótarján axis.

As co-ordination between Red Army 3rd Division (including 80th brigade) and 3rd Corps was weak, brigade command only became aware of the attack on 18 May, when 27 Czechoslovak horsemen were intercepted at Zabar. Pétervására fell by 9:00 18 May. Expoliting the gap to the south, they advanced to Recsk and Szarvaskő by the end of the day. Mainwhile, Feled fell on 15 May, and Ajnácskő on 19 May.

On 19 May, Czechoslovaks set course towards Kisterenye. The main column advanced by today's Road 23, through Nádújfalu and Nemti. On the flanks, they advanced to Mátranovák, Homokterenye and Mátramindszent Railway Station. 7th Company intercepted them at Nemti, but could only resist for a couple of hours. At 18:00, Kisterenye fell, and communications with Salgótarján were cut off. Battalion 46/1 (in transport to Kecskemét) engaged them, but were forced to retreat back to Salgótarján.

The encirclement was not complete, and on the morning of 20 May, Battalion 16/2 from Szécsény re-established communications. However, the city would ultimately be relieved by the launch of the Red Army's offensive on Miskolc. 3rd Corps (1., 4., 5., 6. divisions) was ordered to launch an offensive towards Miskolc on 15 May, and the attack was launched on 20 May. On its left flank, 5th Division advanced from Sirok to Pétervására by 20 May, now in turn threatening the encircling Czechoslovak forces with encirclement. The same day, attacks on Kisterenye also resumed by Battalion 46/1 from the north, and Battalion 11/1 from the south. Caught between the three formations, the Czechoslovak position collapsed - Hungarians captured 300 men and 25 machine guns.

On 20 May, Czechoslovak 4th Brigade positioned north of Salgótarján crossed the Ipoly between Nógrádszakál and Ipolygalsa (Holiša). Hungarian forces fell back to defenses around Salgótarján. 46th Regiment was held down around Nádújfalu, mopping up the Czechoslovaks fleeing from Kisterenye. By 21 May, they were re-deployed against Czechoslovak 4th Brigade alongside 101st Regiment returned to the northern front. They went on the offensive, and by 23 May reached the Ipoly and the Fülek-Feled railway, completely clearing the area south of the Ipoly and Rima rivers by 26 May.

== Aftermath ==
As a result of Czechoslovak defeats under Salgótarján and Miskolc, the Italian military mission was relieved, replaced by French officers. On 26 May, Pellé is named Chief of Staff. Piccione leaves his post on 31 May. The Czechoslovak forces are re-organised into two corps, West (Mittelhauser) and East (Hennocque).

Concurrent to the repulsed attack on Salgótarján, 3rd Corps successfully re-captured Miskolc. Starting from 30 May, a large scale Hungarian offensive was launched across the entire northern front, known as the Northern Campaign, re-capturing large areas of Slovakia.

== Legacy ==
During the reign of Mátyás Rákosi, the battle was incorporated into the dictator's cult of personality. He served as a Commissar for social production under the Soviet Republic, and visited the Czechoslovak Front on mission. State narratives emphasized his role during the battle for Salgótarján, claiming his intervention saved the city from capture. The Day of Rage (A harag napja), a 1952 play by Kálmán Sándor and its 1953 film adaptation by Zoltán Várkonyi are based on this narrative.

== Sources ==
- Balázs, József (1954). "Salgótarján, 1919". Hadtörténeti Közlemények
- Liptai, E., Borus, J., & Tóth, S. (1984). Magyarország hadtörténete
- Murber, Ibolya (2021). Nyugat-Magyarországtól Burgenlandig, 1918-1924. Budapest, BTK Történettudományi Intézet
- Ormos, M. (1998). Magyarország a két világháború korában, 1914-1945 (Vol. 6). Csokonai Kiadó.
