= GB News =

British television news channel

- Country: United Kingdom
- Broadcast area: Worldwide
- Headquarters: London, England, UK

Programming
- Language: English

Ownership
- Owner: All Perspectives Ltd.
- Key people: Alan McCormick (Chairman); Angelos Frangopoulos (CEO)

History
- Launched: 13 June 2021; 5 years ago
- Founder: Andrew Cole; Mark Schneider

Links
- Website: www.gbnews.com

Availability

Terrestrial
- Freeview: Channel 236
- Sky TV: Channel 512

Streaming media
- gbnews.com: Live stream
- YouTube: Live stream

GB News is a British free-to-air editorial television and radio news channel based in London, England. Announced in September 2020 and launched in June 2021 from studios at Paddington Basin, London, GB News became Britain's first television news start-up since the launch of Sky News in 1989. It was set up with the aim of broadcasting "original news, opinion and debate", with a mix of news coverage and opinion-based content. With a right-wing orientation on political issues, the channel's hosts include Nigel Farage, Eamonn Holmes, Michael Portillo, Jacob Rees-Mogg, Andrew Pierce, and Camilla Tominey.

GB News is jointly owned by hedge fund manager Paul Marshall, who also owns The Spectator and UnHerd and has previously donated to the Conservative Party and the Vote Leave campaign, and Dubai-based investment firm Legatum. Company executives, presenters and editors are also awarded shares. Its CEO is Angelos Frangopoulos, the former CEO of Sky News Australia, and the chairman is Alan McCormick, a partner at Legatum. The journalist and broadcaster Andrew Neil, who left the BBC in 2020 to join the channel, became its first chairman and presented a primetime evening programme. He left in September 2021, two weeks after the official launch, having presented only nine episodes.

GB News ranks as Britain's fourth to sixth most watched news broadcaster. In the second half of 2025, it had higher average viewership but half the weekly reach of Sky News and the BBC News Channel. Polling studies find that GB News is the least trusted major news broadcaster in Britain, and the only one with negative net trust. (Note: In a poll for the 2026 Digital News Report by the Reuters Institute for the Study of Journalism at the University of Oxford, 46% of the British public considered GB News untrustworthy, versus 27% trustworthy (net -19%), and in an October 2025 poll for the Cardiff School of Journalism, Media and Culture, 43% considered it untrustworthy, versus 18% trustworthy (net -25). BBC News, Sky News, ITV News, Channel 4 News and Channel 5 News all scored positive trust ratings.) GB News has made substantial losses in every year of operation, with losses covered by further funding from its owners totalling £141 million as of 2025.

The investigation launched into a breach of Ofcom's standards on 12 November 2023 was the subject of 14 investigations into the compliance of Ofcom's impartiality rules, including cases of potential breaches of the rule that, apart from in exceptional circumstances, politicians should not act as newsreaders, reporters or interviewers. As of 17 March 2025, Ofcom has dropped all of its remaining impartiality investigations following a High Court decision, in GB News's favour, that overturned Ofcom's previous findings, which were all ruled unlawful. In light of this decision, Ofcom intended to tighten its rules to prevent politicians from acting as presenters on TV or radio, but dropped the proposals following opposition from GB News and Rupert Murdoch's News UK.

== History ==
=== Foundation ===
All Perspectives Ltd was founded as the holding company of GB News in September 2019, and was granted a licence to broadcast by Ofcom in January 2020. GB News was founded by Andrew James Cole and Mark Schneider, two executives associated with the chairman of Liberty Global, John C. Malone. By August 2022, Cole and Schneider had resigned as directors after their holdings in the company were purchased by backers Sir Paul Marshall and Legatum.

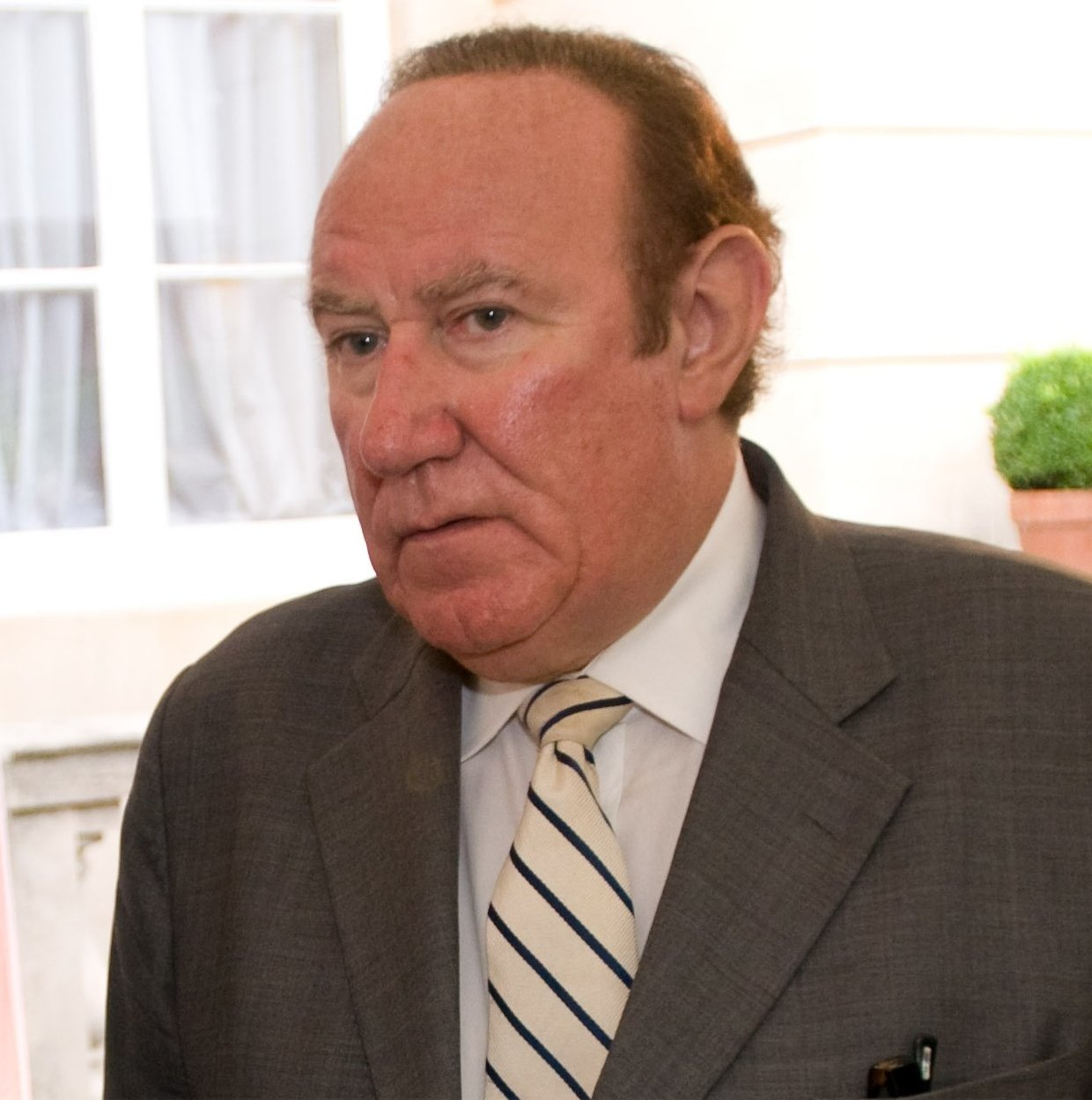
Andrew Neil, former GB News chairman and presenter, was the face of the channel in the run-up to its launch.

On 25 September 2020, it was announced that Andrew Neil, who had presented live political programmes on the BBC for 25 years, would leave the corporation after leading its coverage of the 2020 United States presidential election. He said that he had been in discussions to continue working on the BBC in a new format after the cancellation of his programme The Andrew Neil Show, but that these talks had "not come to fruition" and he had accepted the post of chairman of a new television news channel. On the same day, he was announced as the presenter of a prime-time evening programme on the channel, due to launch early the next year. In a statement, Neil said that the channel would "champion robust, balanced debate and a range of perspectives on the issues that affect everyone in the UK, not just those living in the London area", and GB News was addressing a perceived gap in the market for "the vast number of British people who feel underserved and unheard by their media".

In December 2020, Paul Marshall, a hedge-fund manager, was in talks to invest £10 million into GB News. On 6 January 2021, GB News reached its £60 million fundraising aim, which it said was oversubscribed. The majority of the £60 million came from the Dubai-based investment firm Legatum, Marshall, who said he was investing in a personal capacity, and American multinational Discovery, Inc.; after the merger of Discovery with WarnerMedia (owners of CNN) to form Warner Bros. Discovery, the company's stake in All Perspectives was bought out by the other backers in August 2022 as part of an additional capital injection of £60 million. Marshall and Legatum jointly own the company through All Perspectives Ltd., in which they each own around 40%.

Prior to its launch, GB News said it would recruit 140 staff, including 120 journalists, and would also launch "streaming, video-on-demand and audio services". Since then, CEO Angelos Frangopoulos reported that the channel had employed over 200 journalists.

The recruitment drive began on 25 January 2021. The first presenters and journalists announced in the recruitment drive were Dan Wootton, Colin Brazier, Darren McCaffrey, Tom Harwood, Michelle Dewberry, Inaya Folarin Iman, and Alex Phillips. Following Piers Morgan's departure from Good Morning Britain on 9 March, Neil expressed interest in Morgan joining GB News instead. Neil later said that talks were affected by a disagreement: "he's [Morgan] got his own idea of what he is worth and we [GB News] have a slightly different idea of what he's worth". Later staff announced as joining the channel prior to its launch were Liam Halligan, Andrew Doyle, Rosie Wright, Simon McCoy, Kirsty Gallacher, Alastair Stewart, Neil Oliver, Gloria De Piero, Mercy Muroki, and Isabel Webster.

For the period ending 31 May 2021 All Perspectives Ltd made a loss of £2.7 million.

=== Launch ===
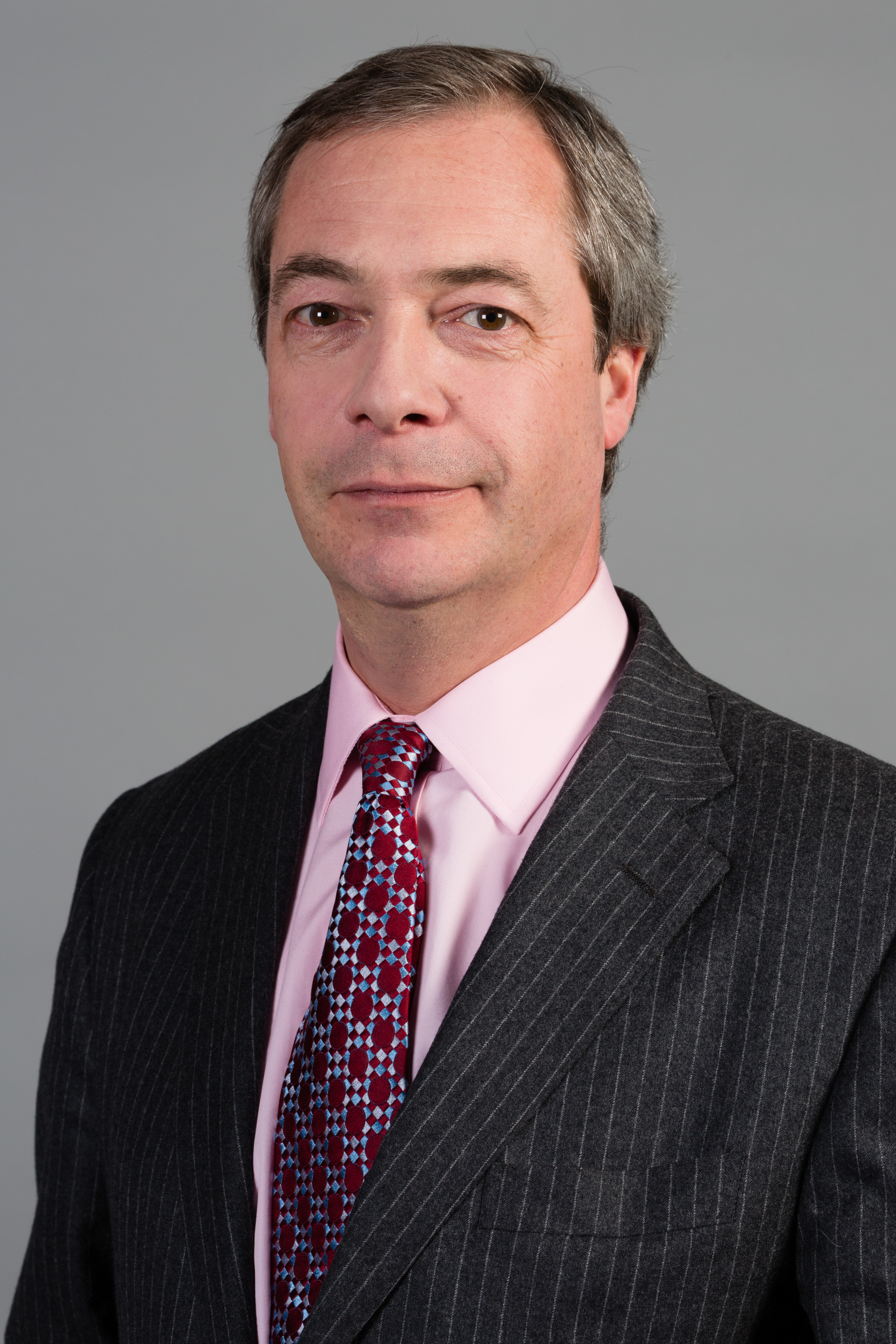
Nigel Farage, former leader of UKIP and the leader of the Reform UK, presents a prime-time show on GB News.

GB News commenced broadcasting at 20:00 BST on 13 June 2021. Neil launched the channel by saying "We are proud to be British – the clue is in the name", and after the opening night was said to be "jubilant" that his programme had "out-rated Sky News and BBC News Channel combined". On 20 June, Nigel Farage and Dehenna Davison joined GB News as contributors to host the Sunday morning political discussion programme The Political Correction.

Neil took a break from presenting on the channel on 24 June, less than two weeks after its launch. It was reported by The Guardian in July that John McAndrew, director of news and programmes, formerly of Sky News and Euronews, had stood down from his role. Senior executive producer Gill Penlington, formerly of CNN, ITV and Sky News, also left the channel in early July. On 17 July it was announced that Nigel Farage, already a contributing presenter, would host Farage, a prime-time evening show, from 19 July. Later that month, Mark Dolan joined the channel.

The following month, Talkradio's Patrick Christys joined to present To the Point on weekday mornings alongside Mercy Muroki. The programme replaced Brazier & Muroki.

On 10 August, the channel announced four political programmes to launch within weeks; The Briefing: AM with Tom Harwood, The Briefing: Lunchtime with Gloria De Piero, The Briefing: PM with Darren McCaffrey, and The Briefing: PMQs. The following month, political journalist Isabel Oakeshott joined to host a weekly show.

Neil was expected to have rejoined GB News in early September, but multiple news sources reported that his return had been postponed, with some speculating that this postponement might become indefinite. On 13 September he announced he was stepping down as chairman and would no longer be presenting on the channel. He had presented a total of nine episodes on the channel. Later that month, on the BBC's Question Time, Neil said that he had become a "minority of one" on the channel's board, due to disputes over its approach to journalism. Neil was replaced as a presenter by Colin Brazier in what The Telegraph described as a "fight back by swinging to the right". Neil had been on a contract worth £4 million and included stress among the reasons for departing GB News. In November 2021, Neil called his decision to lead the channel the "single biggest mistake" of his career.

In April 2024, whilst appearing before a House of Lords committee, Neil described his departure to peers, saying 'What I didn't want it [GB News] to become – I could see it was happening, which is why I left almost immediately – was an outlet for bizarre conspiracy theories or anti-vaxxers or, basically, the nutty end of politics', further describing what he saw as a drift towards the style of the US network Fox News, telling peers such a drift would be 'bad for Britain' and describing the channel's production values looking 'as if it were coming from the nuclear bunker of the president of North Korea'.

=== Post Andrew Neil era ===
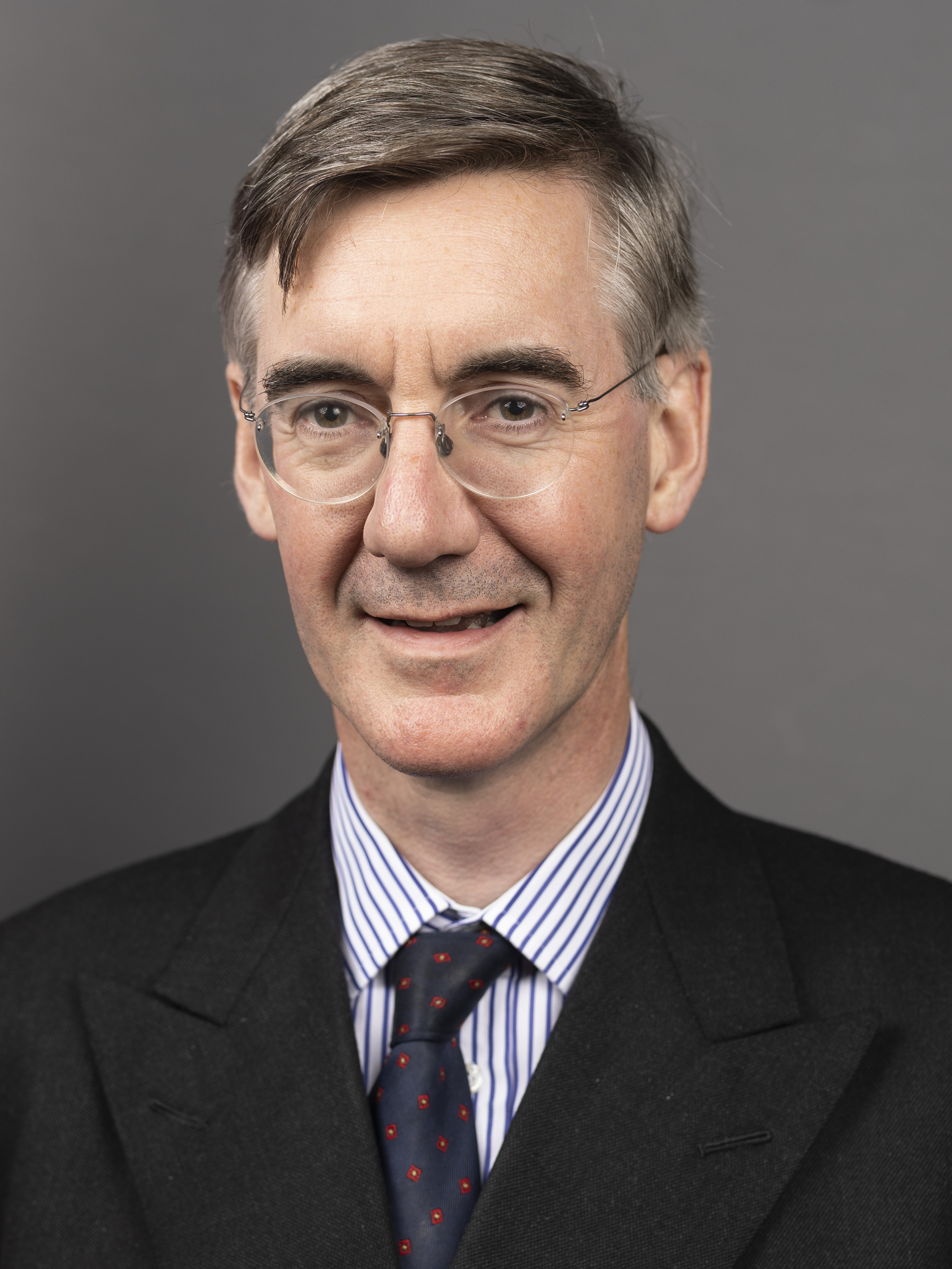
Jacob Rees-Mogg was one of the high-profile presenters joining the channel in 2023.

In October, following the launch announcement of rival TalkTV, GB News introduced half-hourly news bulletins and Sunday Express editor Mick Booker joined as editorial director.

In late 2021, it was announced that Eamonn Holmes and Isabel Webster would present a Monday to Thursday breakfast show, Breakfast with Eamonn and Isabel. Stephen Dixon and Anne Diamond would present this show Friday to Sunday. In January 2022, the channel announced it would play "God Save the Queen" at the start of live programming every day.

Camilla Tominey, Michael Portillo and Andrew Pierce were announced as new presenters in August 2022. Also, after the merger of AT&T's WarnerMedia and Discovery Inc., the shares that Discovery had initially acquired in the channel's early days were put up for sale by new media group Warner Bros. Discovery. Discovery's 25% stake was sold for £8 million, valuing the company at £32 million, almost half of what it was valued at in 2021.

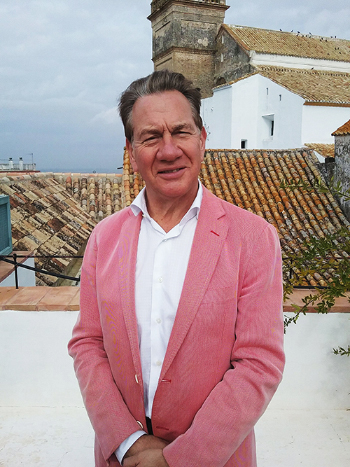
Michael Portillo hosts a show on politics, culture and the arts.

In early September 2022, in a shakeup of the channel's afternoon programming, it was announced that presenters Colin Brazier and Alex Phillips had left the channel. In the days following the death of Queen Elizabeth II, all regular programming was stopped and no advertisements were shown on the channel, with Alastair Stewart, Dan Wootton, Nigel Farage, Mark Longhurst and Patrick Christys presenting most of the coverage of the death of the Queen and Charles III's accession to the throne.

In September 2022, novelist and former Head of Daytime at ITV and Channel 4 Helen Warner was appointed Head of Television at GB News. Warner left the channel four months later, in January 2023.

In October 2022, it was announced that actor and comedian John Cleese would be presenting his own show on GB News in 2023. In 2022 Conservative member of the House of Lords, Helena Morrissey, Baroness Morrissey, became a director of GB News's parent company, All Perspectives.

Following the cancellation of the weekday show To the Point, in November 2022, Bev Turner began hosting her own GB News show Bev Turner Today. She had already been a stand-in presenter on the channel.

=== Influx of politician-presenters ===
In January 2023, GB News announced that the Conservative MP for North East Somerset and former Brexit Opportunities Minister Jacob Rees-Mogg would join the channel as a presenter. ACOBA were notified of Rees-Mogg's appointment and made clear that his role with the channel is subject to a number of conditions. A fifth Conservative MP, Lee Anderson, was announced to be joining the channel's hosting lineup in March.

Ofcom have found the channel to have breached its standards on more than one occasion regarding misinformation.

Stewart retired as a regular presenter in 2023.

In July 2023, an investigation was launched by the Parliamentary Commissioner for Standards regarding Lee Anderson and a promotional video created for his GB News show.

In August 2023, Byline Times revealed that GB News had "settled an employment claim for a five-figure sum in which sexual harassment was alleged against its chief executive Angelos Frangopoulos – and shut down serious racism and bullying allegations raised by two other journalists with further pay-outs and gagging agreements".

In October 2023, it was announced that Conservative politician Boris Johnson, a former Prime Minister of the United Kingdom, would be joining GB News in a presenting role. Fellow upcoming GB News presenter John Cleese commented on Johnson's appointment noting that "I can hardly believe that GB News will give this proven serial liar his own programme". However, Johnson is believed to have cold feet about taking the role. As of January 2026 Johnson had not appeared at the studios, and the station was unable to confirm that he would take up the position.

In November 2023, it was revealed that ownership of shares in the channel had been handed out to a number of people including some of the network's presenters such as Nigel Farage, Arlene Foster, Eamonn Holmes, Jacob Rees-Mogg, Neil Oliver, Camilla Tominey and Dan Wootton. Laurence Fox had also been given shares, though they were cancelled upon his leaving. Michael Farmer, Baron Farmer, former treasurer of the Conservative party, increased his stake, and Michael Spencer sold his.

In 2023, former Channel 4 journalist Michael Crick – who regularly featured on Jacob Rees-Mogg's programme on GB News – spoke to Neil Oliver on his show, discussing freedom of speech. During his appearance, he said that Ofcom should regulate the channel for being politically biased, saying: "I've been fighting bias in television for a very long time, and it's one of the reasons I left Channel 4 News 'cause I thought it was left-wing biased, and I think Ofcom, which is one of the weakest institutions on the planet, should get a grip on you lot. It's absurd that you have Tory MP, after Tory MP, after Tory MP, two leaders of the Brexit Party [as hosts], and hardly any Labour MPs – you are a right-wing channel and the rules in this country are very clear." Crick was abruptly removed from the programme and studio following his remarks, as the channel went to an advert break. When the show went back on air, Oliver said that he was "very disappointed about the sequence of events that just unfolded. The last thing I want to see during a conversation between grown-ups about censorship is that conversation being brought abruptly to a close by others. I feel that that conversation should have gone on to its conclusion. That's the situation in which I find myself, I don't stand by censorship." In a later discussion, he characterised the situation as "a discussion about censorship being censored". Crick later described GB News as a "right-wing propaganda channel".

Nigel Farage, who has his own show on the channel, stood as leader of Reform UK in the 2024 United Kingdom general election and was elected as the Member of Parliament for Clacton.

In July 2024, GB News announced that it would begin using artificial intelligence (AI) to generate sports radio bulletins, and promised that this was "the tip of the iceberg" for its use of AI. Chief digital officer Geoff Marsh said that GB News was "already using AI across our editorial operation" and that AI updates "require almost no human intervention". As of 2024, GB News was the only UK news broadcaster to use AI to generate public-facing output. In July 2026, GB News announced that it would make up to 90 job cuts after having automated some of its "workflows".

In June 2026, former GB News presenter Dan Wootton accused the channel of becoming "effectively a propaganda outfit for Reform UK and [to] put Nigel Farage in Downing Street".

== Financial standings ==
GB News has made consistent losses in every year since it began broadcasting, including losses of £30.7 million in 2021–22, £42.4 million in 2022–23, £33.4 million in 2023–24, and £22.1 million in 2024–25. Its owners, hedge fund manager Paul Marshall and Dubai-based investment firm Legatum, have provided the company with further funding to stem the ongoing losses. As of May 2025, GB News had made total losses of £132 million, and owed £141 million to its parent company All Perspectives Ltd.

In the financial year to May 2023, GB News' losses were six times greater than revenue. In the year 2022–23, it had on average 295 employees, up from 175 in 2021–22. In April 2024, the company started its first major redundancy exercise, with 40 roles to be removed. In the year to May 2025, GB News made a loss of £22.1 million, but grew revenue by 58 percent to £26.2 million. In that year, it cut its wage bill by nearly £3 million, reducing its employee count from 311 to 263. GB News' 2025 annual report stated that due to "strong support from its investors", the company's directors "have a reasonable expectation that the company has adequate resources to continue in operational existence for the foreseeable future". In July 2026, GB News announced plans to cut more than one third of its workforce.

According to Nic Newman of the Reuters Institute for the Study of Journalism, Marshall's funding of GB News and acquisition of The Spectator "highlights concern that news media are increasingly being viewed as a way to buy political influence". Matt Walsh, head of the journalism school at Cardiff University, noted that while Rupert Murdoch used his media to build wealth, Marshall was already wealthy before his media acquisitions, and uses his mostly loss-making outlets for political influence.

By February 2024, GB News had paid more than £660,000 to Conservative MPs, compared to £1,100 to Labour MPs. Between July 2024 and June 2026, GB News paid more than £1,000,000 to Reform MPs, including £700,000 to Nigel Farage, significantly more than his salary as an MP. In March 2026, Labour MP Liam Byrne accused GB News of being part of a new "media-political complex" used by a few wealthy donors to buy political influence and support right-wing politicians.

== Transmission ==
=== Television ===
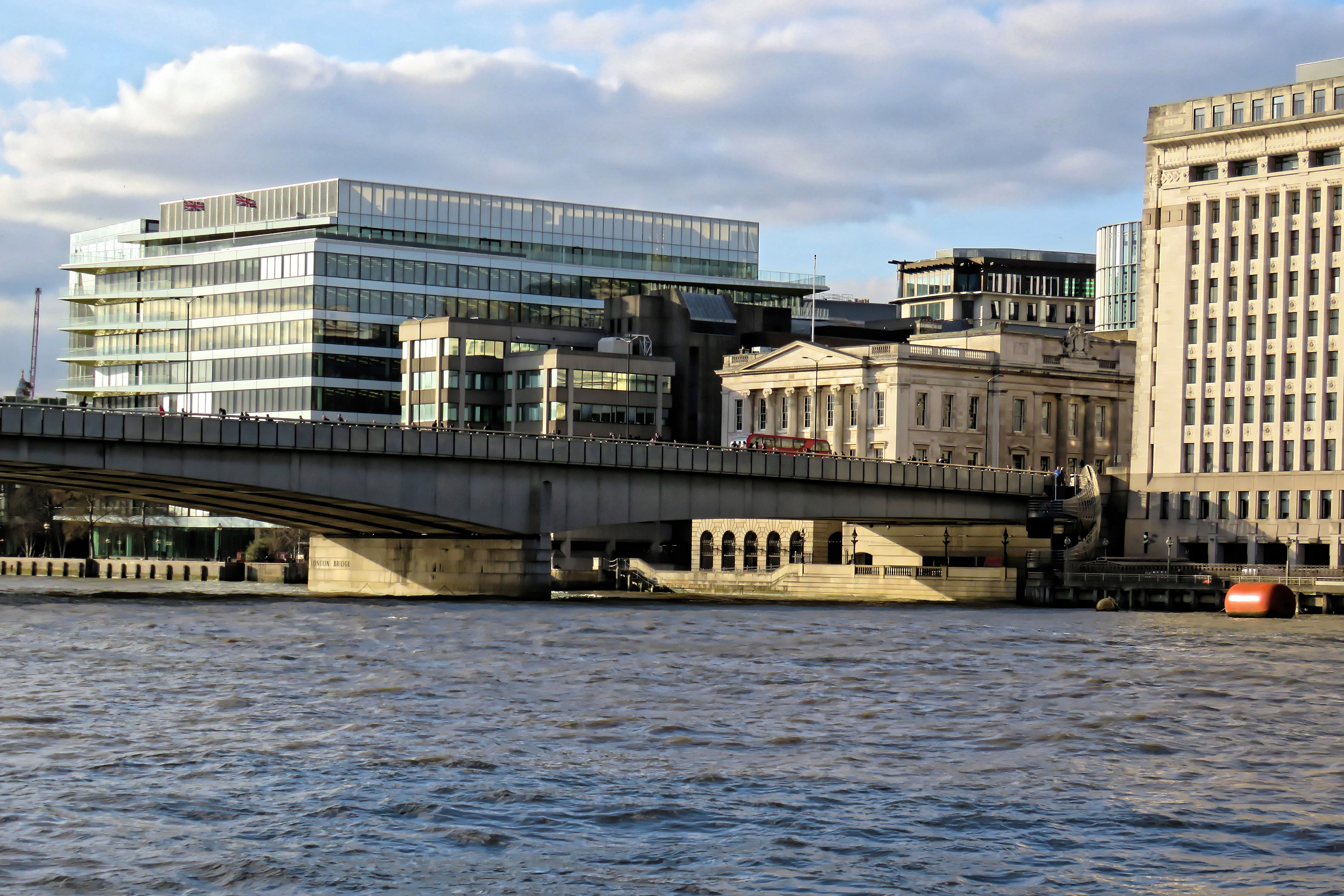
GB News headquarters, Riverbank House (building pictured on left), is separate from its studios in Paddington.

The channel's office headquarters are at Riverbank House in London, and it has studios at The Point building in the Paddington Basin area of the city. Later, the channel also began to broadcast from a studio on Albert Embankment with views towards Westminster and the Houses of Parliament. In 2023, GB News confirmed that it was expanding to another location in Westminster. The channel began broadcasting from the new location on 28 August 2023 and later broadcast entire programmes from the new complex, located in the former Sky News Westminster studio at the QE2 Centre.

GB News employs around 120 journalists, comedians and presenters. Several serving Members of Parliament are currently employed as presenters on the channel, including some who recently held positions within the previous Johnson and Truss cabinets. Ofcom's rules state that MPs can be presenters but cannot be utilised as newsreaders.

GB News is transmitted on digital terrestrial television in standard-definition and in high-definition on a satellite. It originally used the Astra 2F satellite providing coverage of mostly the British Isles only, but switched to Astra 2G in November 2023 making reception in all of Europe possible (primarily for British expats), whilst maintaining a strong satellite footprint in the British Isles.

In September 2025 the channel started transmission also on Eutelsat W7A satellite providing coverage across the Middle East as far as Pakistan, including the Gulf States, as well as North Africa and North-West Africa. The transmissions are available on the Freeview, YouView, Freesat (Channel 216 HD), Sky and Virgin Media platforms.

In October 2023, GB News was banned from the Welsh Senedd's internal TV system, with a spokesperson for the presiding officer claiming the channel was "deliberately offensive, demeaning to public debate and contrary to our parliament's values".

=== Radio ===
==== GB News Radio ====
Following the launch of its television channel, in July 2021, GB News announced its intention to launch a national 24-hour radio station, GB News Radio, on the Digital One digital radio multiplex. The radio station is an audio simulcast of the televised channel, rather than a separate production, and started test transmissions in December 2021. Eamonn Holmes and Isabel Webster were the first to be heard on the simulcast when their television breakfast show started on 4 January 2022.

RAJAR publishes quarterly statistics on radio audiences; GB News had a weekly audience of 317,000 for a listening share of 0.2% for June 2023. By the end of the third quarter of 2023 that figure had risen to 398,000. Figures for the final quarter of 2023, published on 1 February 2024, showed an average weekly audience of 430,000.

==== GB Music Radio ====
In October 2026, GB Media announced it would be launching GB Music Radio. Operating under the strapline "All British, All Day", the station plays music spanning six decades, with the claim that every track played is "performed by an artist from Great Britain or Northern Ireland, or a band whose members are predominantly British". Paul Coyte hosts weekday breakfast, Rick Houghton on Drive, and Nana Akua presents weekend mornings. The station officially launched on 2 November 2026.

=== Internet ===
The channel is available on Samsung TV Plus, LG webOS TV's (LG Channels), Rakuten TV, Apple TV, YouTube and live on the GB News application for mobile devices on iOS and Android. Red Bee Media has provided playout services for GB News since the channel's launch.

Streaming platform Truth+ offers GB News in their free basic package.

In March 2023, GB News changed its top-level domain from .uk to .com with the intention of attracting foreign readers.

== Programming ==
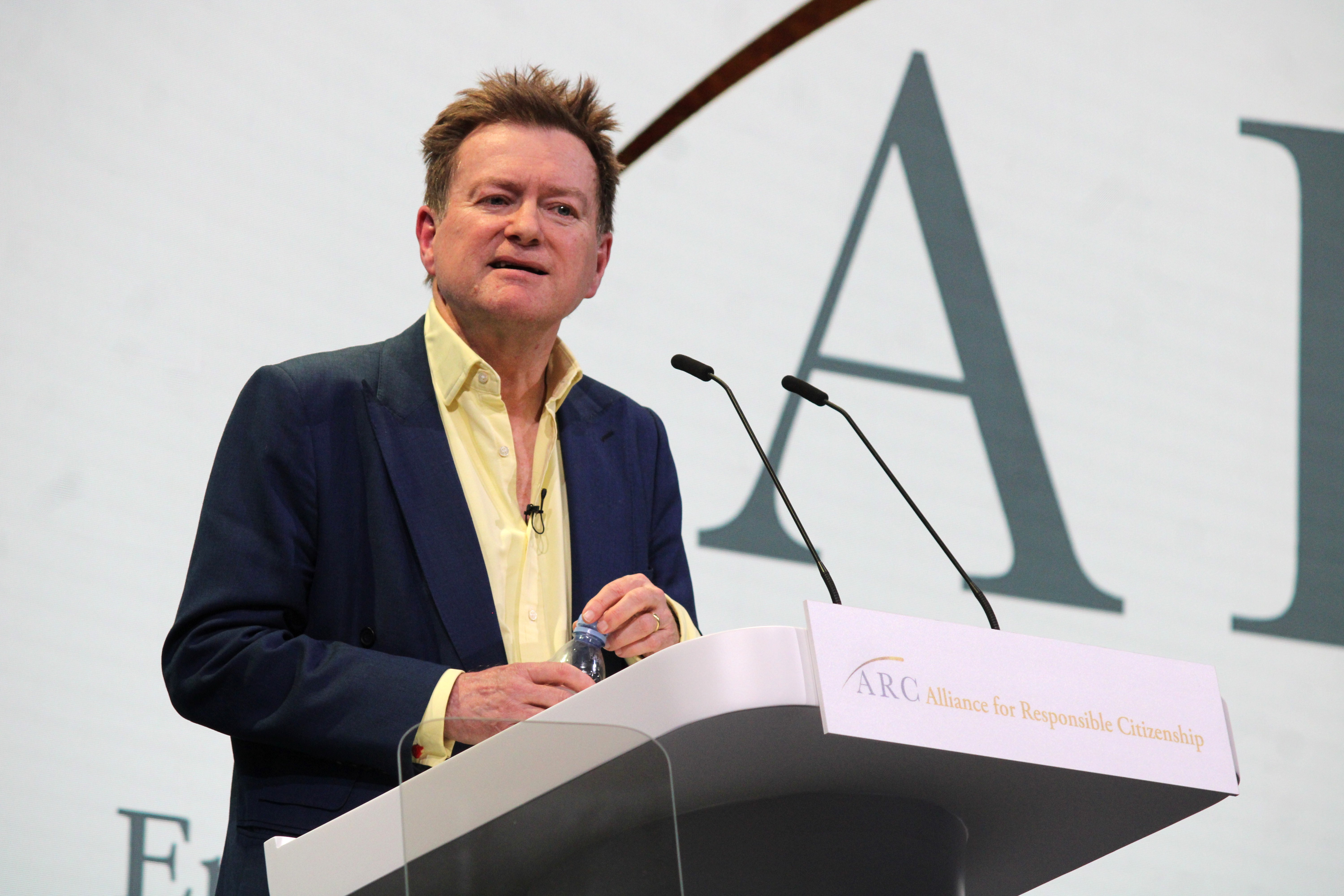
Joint owner Paul Marshall in 2025

Andrew Neil stated in January 2021 that the channel would be "a fresh approach to news in Britain, Northern Ireland and the Republic of Ireland". The channel plans to air 6,500 hours of "original news, opinion and debate" per year and it has hired 120 journalists. Neil has said that the channel would not provide rolling news, but would, in similarity with some US networks like MSNBC and Fox News, divide each day into "individual programmes, news-based programmes, built around very strong presenters". He said that it would aim to offer programming that would become "an appointment to view". CEO Angelos Frangopoulos added that it will be a "mix" of news coverage and opinion where it will be taking "a very different view on the regulatory environment" that is controlled by Ofcom. Instead of providing rolling news, the channel would be a mix of news, analysis, opinion and debate.

Five months before the channel launched, BBC News media editor Amol Rajan said GB News would be the first in the United Kingdom to be set up with an explicit political orientation. Other forecasters also said the channel would be right-leaning, and the Financial Times, The Guardian and City A.M. predicted that it would be similar to Fox News. In The New York Times, Neil was quoted as saying, "In terms of formatting and style, I think MSNBC and Fox are the two templates we're following". He also told the Evening Standard that Fox News was "an easy, inaccurate shorthand for what we are trying to do. In terms of format, we are like Fox, but we won't be like Fox in that they come from a hard right disinformation fake news conspiracy agenda. I have worked too long and hard to build up a journalistic reputation to consider going down that route." While acknowledging the channel to have an explicit right-wing political leaning, BBC media editor Amol Rajan also stated that "the validity of [the Fox News] comparison is limited". GB News has not explicitly indicated a political allegiance, and UK news broadcasters are required by Ofcom to maintain "due impartiality". Comparisons in programming, format and political leanings have also been made between GB News and Sky News Australia, itself formerly led by GB News CEO Angelos Frangopoulos.

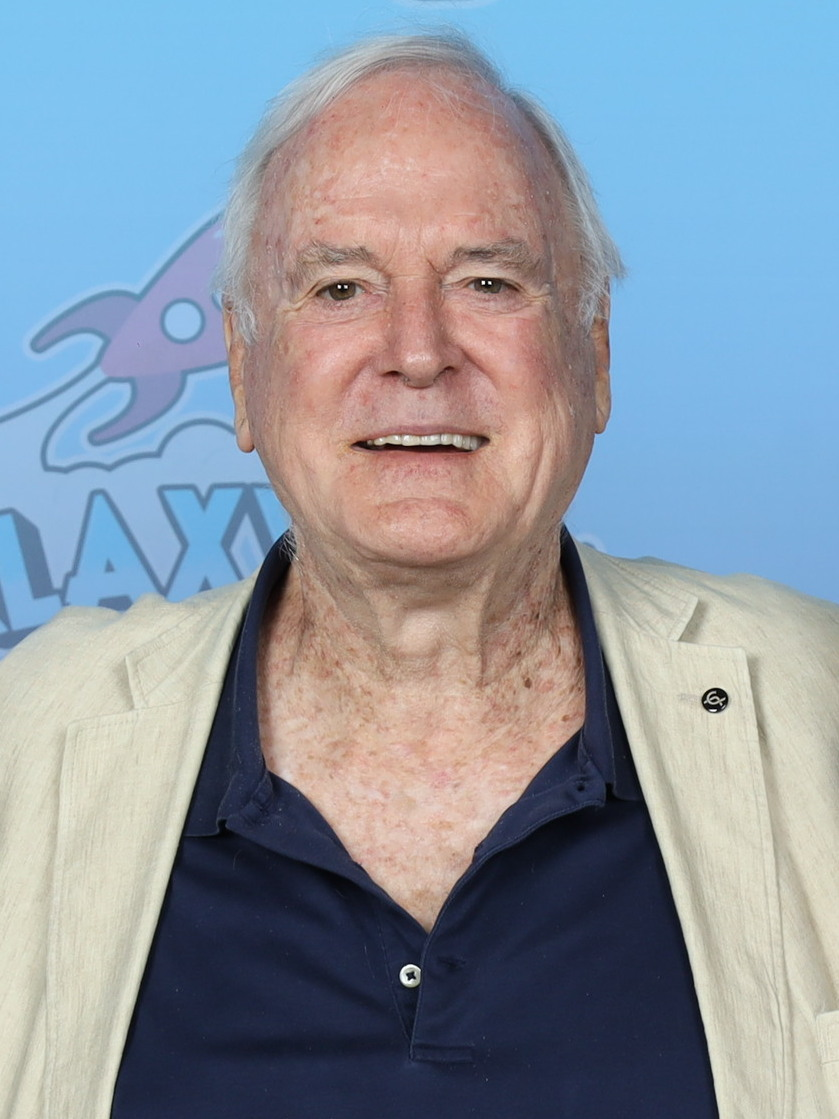
Comic actor John Cleese had his own show on the channel called The Dinosaur Hour.

In a March 2021 episode of BBC Radio 4's The Media Show, Neil stated that his nightly news programme would contain segments such as "Wokewatch" and "Mediawatch". The channel's breakfast show, The Great British Breakfast, initially had three co-anchors, in a similar style to Fox News' Fox & Friends, but the format changed to two co-anchors from the second week of broadcasting. Free Speech Nation, a current affairs show hosted by Andrew Doyle, airs once a week. GB News has also produced comedy shows such as a weekly topical comedy panel show titled Ministry of Offence, and a comedic newspaper review show Headliners.

In May 2022, former GB News staff told the New Statesman that at times they were so desperate for guests, they had resorted to "booking their own parents".

In June 2022, GB News became the live broadcaster of The Twelfth celebrations in Northern Ireland, after BBC Northern Ireland announced that it would no longer carry live coverage of the event and would instead reduce its output to an hour-long highlights programme. Arlene Foster, former First Minister of Northern Ireland, presented the GB News programme. As of 2025, GB News continues to broadcast The Twelfth celebrations with Foster hosting.

In July 2023, presenter Dan Wootton used his GB News show to publicly deny any wrongdoing regarding allegations made in the press about his conduct. During a 6-minute monologue Wootton explained that he had made "errors of judgment in the past" but that "criminal allegations being made against me are simply untrue".

During the 2024 Conservative Party leadership election, on 17 October 2024, GB News hosted Decision Time: The Race to Lead, the only major programme to feature both leadership contenders, Kemi Badenoch and Robert Jenrick, after negotiations between their camps for the BBC to host a similar programme broke down. The two-hour programme, hosted by Christopher Hope, saw the candidates answer questions from a Conservative-voting audience. It drew a peak audience of 152,600.

== Reception ==
=== Advertiser response ===
In February 2021, four months before the station began broadcasting, the pressure group Stop Funding Hate called for advertisers to boycott the station, based on what they thought it would represent.

In June 2021, following the station's launch, several brands including Vodafone, IKEA, Kopparbergs Brewery, Grolsch, Nivea, Pinterest, Specsavers and Octopus Energy paused their advertising on the channel, expressing concerns over its content. Some of these advertisements had been placed on the brands' behalf without their knowledge, by Sky Media through their advertising opt-outs during GB News's schedule. The then-Culture Secretary, Oliver Dowden, criticised Stop Funding Hate and what he described as "a vocal Twitter minority" for calling for the advertising boycott.

In November 2023, in response to an advertiser boycott, GB News introduced an online paywall with three membership tiers. The channel, known for its outspoken approach, chose to seek new revenue streams following substantial financial losses in its first year and ongoing controversies, including breaches of impartiality rules and run-ins with the broadcasting regulator Ofcom.

=== Ratings and public response ===
==== Critical response ====
The channel launched to a mixed reception. Judith Woods, writing for The Telegraph two days after the channel's launch, described it as "unutterably awful; boring, repetitive and cheapskate", rating it one out of five stars. Chris Bennion of The Telegraph rated it four out of five stars, writing, "On launch night, the GB News message came through loud and clear – despite glitches." Jemima Kelly wrote for the Financial Times, "GB News is so tedious, so lacking in nuance, so whiny and frankly so low-quality, it is actually making me more sympathetic to the cause of those they deem 'woke'."

GB News became the subject of ridicule upon its launch due to the perceived poor production quality of the channel and frequent technical issues. The channel also became subject to a number of pranks, including prank calls and gag names, and had gained the nickname "GBeebies", a pun on the children's channel CBeebies.

In August 2021, seven weeks after GB News' launch, Ian Burrell wrote in the Evening Standard: "This channel has been both lampooned and ignored, but critics need to get used to something: GB News isn't going away."

In the 2026 Reuters Institute for the Study of Journalism survey, 46% of respondents considered GB News untrustworthy, and 27% found it trustworthy. GB News was the only major news broadcaster with negative net trust (-19), below that of ITV News (+42), Channel 4 News (+42), BBC News (at +35), and Sky News (+29). The institute found similar results in 2025, 2024, and 2023. In an October 2025 poll for Cardiff University, 18% considered GB News trustworthy, versus 43% who found it untrustworthy. Every major broadcaster scored a positive net trust except for GB News (at -25). In a 2023 poll by YouGov 12% of respondents ranked GB News as a trusted news-brand, compared to the BBC's 44%.

In the 2023 Savanta BrandVue survey, GB News was the 53rd most popular media brand in the UK, behind Sky (#10), ITV (#12), the BBC (#14), Channel 4 (#23), Channel 5 (#47) and LBC (#51), but ahead of The Guardian (#54) and The Sun (#63). It was the highest brand categorised as "news". According to Savanta, the channel has a "Marmite" appeal whereby its dedicated viewers are obsessively positive about the channel. Savanta explained that GB News "taps into a certain demographic's belief that mainstream media cannot be trusted". In the 2025 edition, GB News ranked as the 1364th most popular UK brand overall, below The Guardian (#1010) and the other named media brands, but above Channel 5 (#1602).

==== Audience share ====
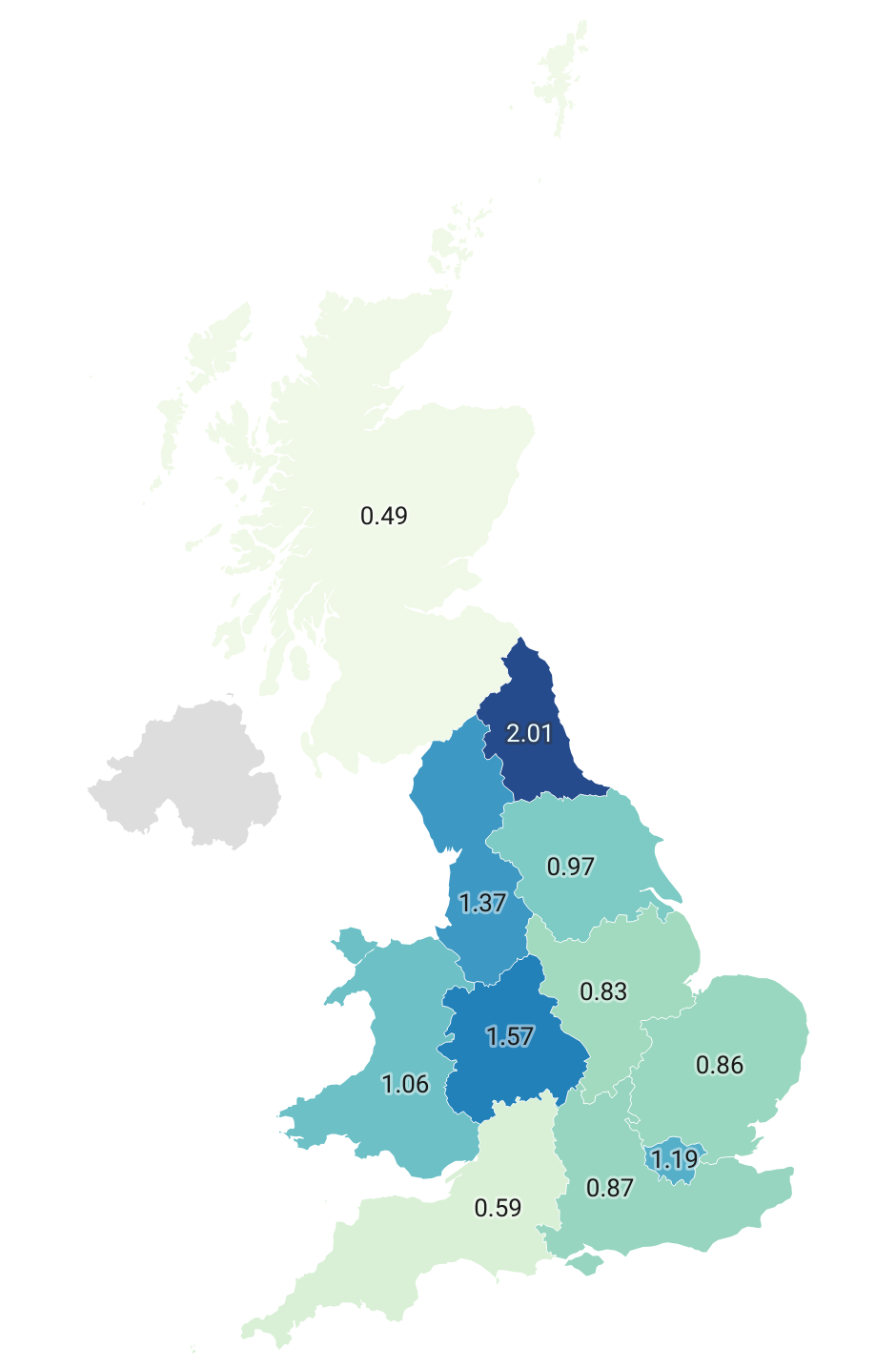
GB News audience by region. Redfield & Wilton, April 2024 (GB only).

In various surveys between 2024 and 2026, GB News ranked as the fifth, fourth, or sixth most watched news broadcaster. It has less than one fifth the audience of BBC News, the most watched news broadcaster. According to BARB, GB News had a monthly television audience of 3.7 million in May 2025. As of 2025, its weekly reach was less than half that of the BBC News Channel and Sky News Channel; additionally, the large majority of BBC News viewership is on BBC One.

In the 2026 Reuters Institute for the Study of Journalism survey, the share of respondents who said they watch GB News every week was 8%, behind BBC News (at 48%), ITV News (24%), Sky News (15%) and Channel 4 News (10%), but ahead of Channel 5 (3%). The institute found shares of 9% in 2025, 7% in 2024, 6% in 2023, and 5% in 2022. In an October 2025 poll for Cardiff University, 12% of respondents said they watched GB News "frequently". In an April 2024 Redfield & Wilton survey, the share of respondents who said they "typically" watch news on GB News was 10%, lower than BBC News (at 62%), ITV News (40%), Sky News (29%), Channel 4 News (19%) and Channel 5 News (11%).

According to the 2024 Redfield & Wilton survey, GB News' highest viewership was found in North East England and the West Midlands, the lowest in Scotland and South West England (see map right). The GB News audience is 62% male and 38% female. Viewers are generally older; 21% are aged 55–64, compared to 12% who are 25-34. Viewers are equally likely to identify as middle class and working class as the general population. 58% of GB News viewers own their own home, while 33% rent. Among homeowners, 26% have a mortgage, 55% have already paid off their mortgage, and 19% did not have one to begin with. 51% voted Conservative in the 2019 election, 22% Labour, 5% Liberal Democrat, and 12% did not vote. In the 2016 EU referendum, 63% voted to leave, 26% to remain, and 11% did not vote. In the coming 2024 election, 38% intended to vote Reform, 25% Conservative, and only 17% Labour (fewer than had in 2019).

Approximately 336,000 viewers tuned in to see the launch of GB News. However, viewership fell following the launch of the channel. A month after its launch, its daily viewership of just over 1 million trailed Sky News' 2.5 to 3 million viewers. Audience figures subsequently fell further, and on 14 July, audience figures dropped so low they were reported as zero by the ratings measurement board BARB at least twice on the day, attributed to regular viewers boycotting the station after one of its presenters, Guto Harri, took a knee on-air in solidarity with the England football team. GB News suspended the presenter, describing the event as an "unacceptable breach of our standards"; Harri later confirmed that he had permanently left the channel. The first episode of Nigel Farage's show on 19 July attracted an average audience of 100,000.

The Daily Telegraph reported that, in October 2021, "Nigel Farage remained the station's biggest draw, hauling in between 50,000 and 80,000 viewers while most of the channel's output remains firmly below 30,000." A Daily Telegraph report in December 2021 stated that Farage's nightly programme regularly gets around 150,000 viewers. In February 2022, the Press Gazette published an article including statistics on the audience and social following for GB News compared with other channels. The article noted that GB News' four-week audience reach was slightly up in early January to 2.2 million, compared to a low point in November 2021.

In May 2022, figures published by Radio Joint Audience Research Limited (RAJAR) showed GB News Radio had received an average audience of 239,000 listeners in its first three months of broadcasting. RAJAR figures for the second quarter of 2022 showed the channel's listenership grew by a further 16%, to 277,000 listeners, making it the second-fastest-growing radio channel in the UK (behind the BBC World Service). Subsequently, between July and September 2022, GB News Radio's weekly audience grew by 50%, to 415,000; it was reported to be the only news radio channel to increase its audience during this period.

In December 2022, Press Gazette reported that GB News had beaten Sky News in primetime ratings over a 30-day period, with 57,107 viewers to Sky's 52,230. The channel remained behind Sky News for all-day viewership, but recorded a 48% increase in primetime viewers relative to the same period in 2021. The article also quoted a Christmas memo sent to staff by Frangopoulos, who said that 'In just 18 months you have worked as a team to end Sky News' undisputed 33-year reign as the most-watched commercial news channel in the United Kingdom'. Frangopoulos added that BARB figures showed the channel's fastest growing areas were in Red Wall regions across the north-east (+17% in Q4 so far), the north-west (+14%), and Yorkshire (+12%)'. By November 2024, GB News had overtaken Sky News for its live TV viewers averaged over a 20-hour period between 6 am and 2 am for one month.

Growing further by July 2025, the average audience for GB News was 80,600, slightly higher than that of the BBC News channel and Sky News. This led editorial director Mick Booker to claim the channel was on course to be the UK's largest news channel. However, in the same month, its weekly reach (the share of all viewers in an average week) was half that of BBC News and Sky News. High average viewership is a result of a smaller number of viewers watching GB News for longer periods. GB News' monthly share for July was 5.8%, compared to 13.2% for the BBC News channel and 11.5% for Sky News. These figures do not include viewers on BBC One, which accounts for the large majority of the BBC News viewership. In late 2025, GB News' online audience went into decline, falling 21% year-on-year in December to 7.3 million users per month.

By January 2026, the average ratings and total audience share for GB News had been the highest of any news channel in Britain for six consecutive months, to which the channel introduced new branding dubbing itself as "Britain's Number One". The channel saw an average audience of 87,700 in December 2025, compared to 74,500 on the BBC News channel and 58,300 on Sky News. However, according to Press Gazette, its digital reach (5,400,000) still trailed that of BBC News (40,900,000) and Sky News (19,200,000), as did its total TV weekly reach. In June 2026, GB News had the third biggest year-on-year online audience decrease, down by 44% to 5.7 million while growing its revenue by two thirds with monthly TV viewers up by 18% from the previous year and total social media followers up 56.4% to 6.1 million.

In September 2026 Ofcom was accused of covering up data that showed GB news was more trusted than the BBC. Ofcom published their news consumption survey omitting details that showed GB news was ranked first for trustworthiness. GB News was also ranked by its viewers above all other British broadcasters for the range of viewpoints on offer and scored first equal with Sky for impartiality.

==== Awards ====
At the TRIC Awards, which is sponsored by GB News, Sky News and other businesses, GB News has won several awards. Farage's nominations have proven controversial at the event, and was booed by some members of the audience during his acceptance speech at both the 2023 and 2024 ceremonies, where he won in his category of News Presenter. Eamonn Holmes was also reported to have been booed at the 2025 ceremony after paying tribute to the work of Charlie Peters – who won in the News Presenter category – for his work on the documentary Grooming Gangs: Britain's Shame, although sources close to Holmes denied that the heckling took place in a statement to The Standard.

Award	Date of ceremony	Category	Nominee(s)	Programme(s)	Result	Ref.
Television and Radio Industries Club Awards	6 July 2022	Multi-Channel News	GB News Breakfast		Nominated	
Television and Radio Industries Club Awards	6 July 2022	News Presenter	Stephen Dixon	GB News Breakfast	Nominated	
Television and Radio Industries Club Awards	6 July 2022	News Presenter	Eamonn Holmes	GB News Breakfast	Won	
Television and Radio Industries Club Awards	27 June 2023	Multi-Channel News	GB News Breakfast		Won	
Television and Radio Industries Club Awards	27 June 2023	News Presenter	Nigel Farage	Farage	Won	
Television and Radio Industries Club Awards	25 June 2024	News	GB News Breakfast		Won	
Television and Radio Industries Club Awards	25 June 2024	News Presenter	Stephen Dixon	GB News Breakfast	Nominated	
Television and Radio Industries Club Awards	25 June 2024	News Presenter	Nigel Farage	Farage	Won	
Television and Radio Industries Club Awards	25 June 2024	News Presenter	Eamonn Holmes	GB News Breakfast	Nominated	
Television and Radio Industries Club Awards	25 June 2024	Interview of the Year	Camilla Tominey - 'Alastair Stewart reveals his heartbreaking diagnosis'	The Camilla Tominey Show	Won	
Television and Radio Industries Club Awards	24 June 2025	News	GB News Breakfast		Won	
Television and Radio Industries Club Awards	24 June 2025	News Presenter	Nigel Farage	Farage	Nominated	
Television and Radio Industries Club Awards	24 June 2025	News Presenter	Charlie Peters	GB News Investigates	Won	
Television and Radio Industries Club Awards	23 June 2026	News	GB News Breakfast		Won	

=== Criticisms ===
The Board of Deputies of British Jews and the All-Party Parliamentary Group against Antisemitism have criticised broadcasts on GB News for what they feel to be promoting "conspiratorial antisemitism or other misinformation", particularly making note of some of Neil Oliver's broadcasts. GB News have been accused of "demonising" transgender people by figures such as broadcaster India Willoughby.

PinkNews and The Argus reported that social media users criticised an "alternative" BBC Match of the Day programme, aired on the channel on 11 March 2023, as being homophobic because it mocked Brighton and its LGBTQ+ community. Alan Tyers of The Daily Telegraph described the programme as an "orgy of inanity". Ofcom received 222 complaints about the segment, but decided not to investigate the incident.

When reporting the Gaza war a number of pro-Hamas messages were read out on air by Nana Akua. GB News apologised for the broadcast and confirmed that counter terrorism police were reviewing the footage.

Zoe Williams, columnist on The Guardian newspaper, has suggested that commercial success is of little relevance to the channel, with backers of the parent company prepared to cover its losses—£42m for the year ending in May 2023—and effectively make large donations to politicians for presenting programmes aligned with their views.

A 2024 report by the Centre for Media Monitoring, a project of the Muslim Council of Britain, alleged that the channel was responsible for half of all British news broadcast coverage about Muslims over a two-year period, with much of the coverage being negative. A GB News spokesperson responded that the report was “inaccurate and defamatory".

== Ofcom investigations ==
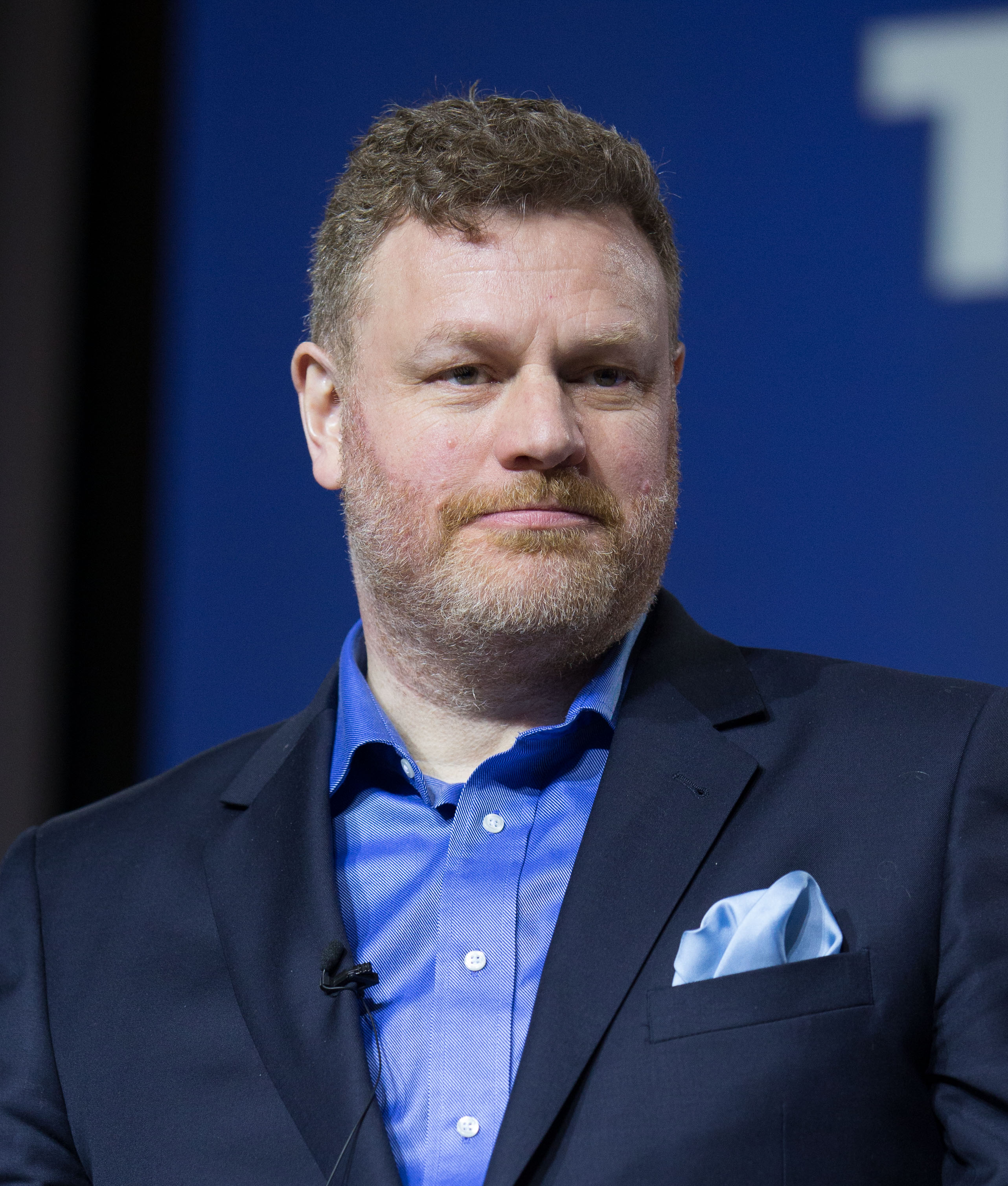
Two of Mark Steyn's features on the channel breached standards regarding misinformation about COVID-19.

Within the channel's first year Ofcom were prompted to launch five investigations into its broadcasts. As of May 2023 more than 4,500 complaints about GB News programmes had been lodged with Ofcom since its launch.

Ofcom received 373 complaints relating to a monologue made on the opening night's edition of Tonight Live with Dan Wootton in which Wootton argued against the government's extension of the COVID-19-related lockdowns in the UK. Ofcom decided not to pursue any of the complaints, a spokesperson saying, "Our rules allow for rigorous debate around the response to coronavirus ... consistent with the right to free expression".

Furthermore, Ofcom have publicly commented on and clarified rules on politicians presenting programmes following the influx of politicians to both TalkTV and GB News.

As of October 2023 Ofcom have found GB News to have breached their licence on six occasions, five of those being considered as "significant", although the regulator did not impose any sanctions such as fines or a request for an on-air clarification. 14 additional investigations are still pending.

In November 2023, Ofcom chairman Michael Grade told the BBC's Sunday with Laura Kuenssberg that the regulator did not "want to be in the business of telling broadcasters, licensees, who they can employ, who they can't employ".

In May 2024, following an Ofcom ruling that GB News had again broken broadcasting rules, the company rebuffed their ruling and launched legal action against the media regulator.

In 2026, Ofcom refused to investigate 32 complaints regarding a GB News interview with Donald Trump, during which he made unchallenged false claims that human-induced climate change is a "hoax" and that parts of London operate under sharia law with no-go areas for police. Ofcom defended its decision by noting that alternative viewpoints were aired in the programme's panel discussion and other segments. Critics – including Chris Banatvala, Ofcom's founding director of standards, and Bob Ward, the communications director of the Grantham Research Institute on Climate Change and the Environment – accused the regulator of giving up on enforcing accuracy and impartiality, allowing biased and misleading content to go unchallenged.

=== Breaches of code ===
On 7 November 2022, Ofcom announced its first finding against GB News, concluding that the channel breached its radio licence in an episode of To The Point on 2 March 2022. Covering the Erdington by-election, GB News displayed a graphic listing all candidates as required by Rules 6.8 to 6.12 of the Code. However, the presenters did not finish reading aloud the whole list, instead advising listeners on its radio simulcast that it was available on social media. All the candidates' names were therefore not read out in full for the channel's audio simulcast as required by rule 6.10. Ofcom issued no sanction against the channel.

On 6 March 2023, Ofcom announced that it had found the Mark Steyn programme, aired on 21 April 2022, in breach of broadcasting rules for a materially misleading interpretation of official data about COVID-19. In February 2023, Steyn revealed on his website that his GB News programme had been cancelled and that the channel had made an offer which he 'had to refuse' because it would have ended his 'right to free speech on air'.

On 9 May 2023, Ofcom found that Mark Steyn breached standards on 4 October 2022. The investigation into Steyn's programme on 4 October 2022 related to comments by Naomi Wolf, a figure who has previously been banned from Twitter for spreading anti-vaccine misinformation. No sanctions were imposed, but following their investigation Ofcom arranged a meeting with GB News "to discuss its approach to compliance".

In April 2023, Ofcom launched an investigation regarding a potential breach of impartiality rules during a programme broadcast on 11 March that was hosted by two Conservative MPs, Esther McVey and Philip Davies, where they interviewed a fellow Conservative MP, Chancellor Jeremy Hunt, about his then imminent Spring Budget. The programme was confirmed by Ofcom to be in breach of their regulations five months later.

Ofcom decided that the 16 June broadcast featuring Martin Daubney breached due impartiality rules when interviewing Richard Tice about immigration, but Ofcom did not impose any further sanctions. In response, GB News acknowledged that the content was non-compliant and stated that "[our staff] will receive further training focused on the issues raised by this broadcast".

In December 2023, Ofcom ruled that the channel had breached impartiality rules with an episode of The Live Desk broadcast on 7 July 2023, which promoted its branded campaign "Don't Kill Cash".

On 18 March 2024, Ofcom ruled that two episodes of Jacob Rees-Mogg's State Of The Nation, two episodes of Friday Morning With Esther And Phil, and one episode of Saturday Morning With Esther And Phil, broadcast during May and June 2023, failed to comply with Rules 5.1 and 5.3 of the Broadcasting Code which state a politician cannot be a newsreader, news interviewer or news reporter unless, exceptionally, there is editorial justification.

On 14 February 2024, Ofcom released a statement on X (formerly Twitter) that they had received a significant number of complaints about a controversial People's Forum involving Prime Minister Rishi Sunak which many viewers considered a clear breach of Ofcom's broadcasting code with a poor attempt to dupe the audience it was not a Party Political Broadcast just days before two by-elections. On 20 May 2024, Ofcom's investigation into the incident concluded that GB News's failure to preserve due impartiality was "serious and – given its two previous breaches of these rules – repeated." Ofcom subsequently began the process of considering a statutory sanction against GB News.

On 28 February 2025, the High Court ruled that two Ofcom rulings against GB News were unlawful, and ordered Ofcom to pay GB News' legal costs. The rulings, that broadcasts hosted by Conservative MP Jacob Rees-Mogg in May and June 2023 were in breach of codes on impartiality and accuracy due to being hosted by a politician, were struck down because the court found that these codes only applied to news coverage, not to current affairs programmes like those hosted by Rees-Mogg. The Guardian described the ruling as a "legal loophole". Ofcom signalled its intention to review these codes in order to restrict politicians from hosting any type of news programme.

=== Other investigations ===
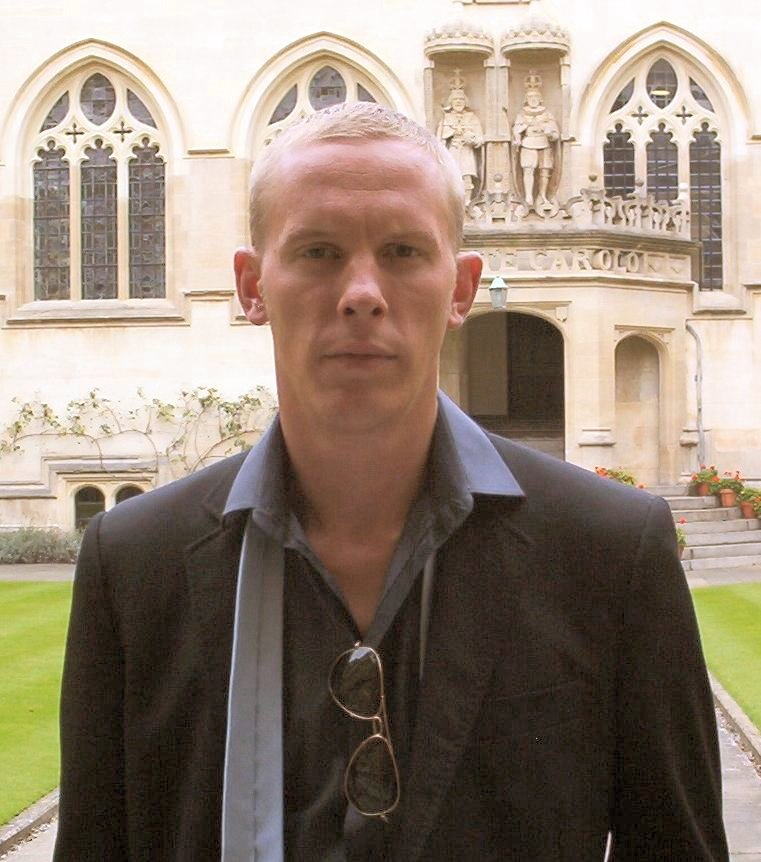
Misogynistic comments broadcast on the channel led to the suspension and exit of Dan Wootton and the sacking of Laurence Fox (pictured) and Calvin Robinson.

A broadcast on 4 April 2022 was looked into for a potential breach of "fairness" regulations regarding Russian war crimes in Ukraine, but was cleared. Farage's 23 August 2021 broadcast was investigated for "offensive language" but was later cleared by the regulator.

In July 2023 Ofcom launched an investigation regarding a potential breach of rules that prevent politicians from acting as newsreaders regarding a broadcast made by Conservative MP Rees-Mogg. A further four investigations were launched the following month.

On 27 September 2023 GB News suspended Laurence Fox and Dan Wootton and launched an internal investigation into their "totally unacceptable" misogynistic comments about a female journalist that were broadcast on the channel the night before. Ofcom also launched an investigation into the incident after receiving more than 7,300 complaints. Wootton's column with MailOnline had previously been paused regarding "a series of allegations", but DMG Media said "following events this week" (regarding the incident on GB News) that they had terminated his contract. In support of the comments made on the channel, Calvin Robinson indicated that he would not be appearing on Wootton's scheduled show without Wootton. Robinson was suspended on 29 September. Chief executive Angelos Frangopoulos called the comments "appalling". The following week Laurence Fox and Calvin Robinson were sacked by GB News. In March 2024, Wootton confirmed he had "exited" GB News following the completion of Ofcom's investigation into the 8,867 complaints. Ofcom's statement on the 4 March, expressed "significant concerns about GB News' editorial control of its live output" citing its "offence rules". It has requested a meeting with the broadcaster, to discuss its compliance practices.

Ofcom decided not to pursue a full impartiality investigation into a broadcast by Lee Anderson on 29 September where he interviewed fellow Conversative Suella Braverman, which had 1697 complaints. On 23 October, Ofcom announced that they were launching an investigation into the 23 June broadcast of Friday Morning with Esther and Philip.

In February 2024, Ofcom cleared a broadcast by Neil Oliver where it was said that COVID-19 vaccines were linked to cases of turbo cancer, an anti-vax myth.

== On-air staff ==
Presenters

- Nana Akua
- Lee Anderson
- Alex Armstrong
- Miriam Cates
- Emily Carver
- Patrick Christys
- Ellie Costello
- Gloria De Piero
- Martin Daubney
- Michelle Dewberry
- Anne Diamond
- Stephen Dixon
- Nigel Farage
- Matthew Goodwin
- Darren Grimes
- Tom Harwood
- Eamonn Holmes
- Christopher Hope
- Josh Howie
- Leo Kearse
- Will Kingston
- Ben Leo
- Dawn Neesom
- Charlie Peters
- Andrew Pierce
- Michael Portillo
- Sophie Reaper
- Jacob Rees-Mogg
- Penny Smith
- Camilla Tominey
- Bev Turner
- Cameron Walker

Regular contributors

- Aaron Armstrong
- Shaun Bailey
- Norman Baker
- Aaron Bastani
- Dougie Beattie
- Steve Bennett
- Aman Bhogal
- Peter Bleksley
- Katie Bowen
- Adam Brooks
- Lara Brown
- Benjamin Butterworth
- Jack Carson
- Kevin Craig
- Lizzie Cundy
- Judita Dasilva
- Charlie Downes
- Linda Duberley
- Peter Edwards
- Bethany Elsey
- Suzanne Evans
- Jacqueline Foster
- Katherine Forster
- Cristo Foufas
- Sam Francis
- Barry Gardiner
- Will Godley
- Ben Habib
- Sophia Hill
- Peter Hitchens
- Renee Hoenderkamp
- Reem Ibrahim
- Danny Kelly
- Esther Krakue
- Stefan Kyriazis
- Matthew Laza
- Jonathan Lis
- Mark Littlewood
- Kelvin MacKenzie
- Lewis Mackenzie
- Jamie McIver
- Scarlett MccGwyer
- Esther McVey
- Tony McGuire
- Carole Malone
- Alan Miller
- Daniel Moylan
- Clare Muldoon
- Fraser Myers
- Nina Myskow
- Nigel Nelson
- Nicholas Owen
- Mike Parry
- Jo Phillips
- Piers Pottinger
- Bill Rammell
- Paul Richards
- Anna Riley
- Angela Rippon
- Tatiana Sanchez
- Connie Shaw
- Matthew Stadler
- Alastair Stewart
- Suzy Stride
- Stephanie Takyi
- Peter Tatchell
- Matthew Torbitt
- Andy Twelves
- Olivia Uttley
- Mark White
- Andy Williams
- Mitchell Durdin
- Russell Quirk

Former on-air staff

- Colin Brazier
- Tonia Buxton
- Adam Cherry
- John Cleese
- Philip Davies
- Dehenna Davison
- Mark Dolan
- Andrew Doyle
- Simon Evans
- Caroline Flint
- Inaya Folarin Iman
- Arlene Foster
- Laurence Fox
- Dominic Frisby
- Kirsty Gallacher
- Liam Halligan
- Guto Harri
- Mark Longhurst
- Simon McCoy
- Polly Middlehurst
- Mercy Muroki
- Andrew Neil
- Isabel Oakeshott
- Neil Oliver
- Alex Phillips
- Calvin Robinson
- Mark Steyn
- Pip Tomson
- Isabel Webster
- Ann Widdecombe
- Dan Wootton

== See also ==
- List of news television channels
