= Calvin Robinson =

British priest and political commentator (born 1985)

The Reverend Calvin Robinson
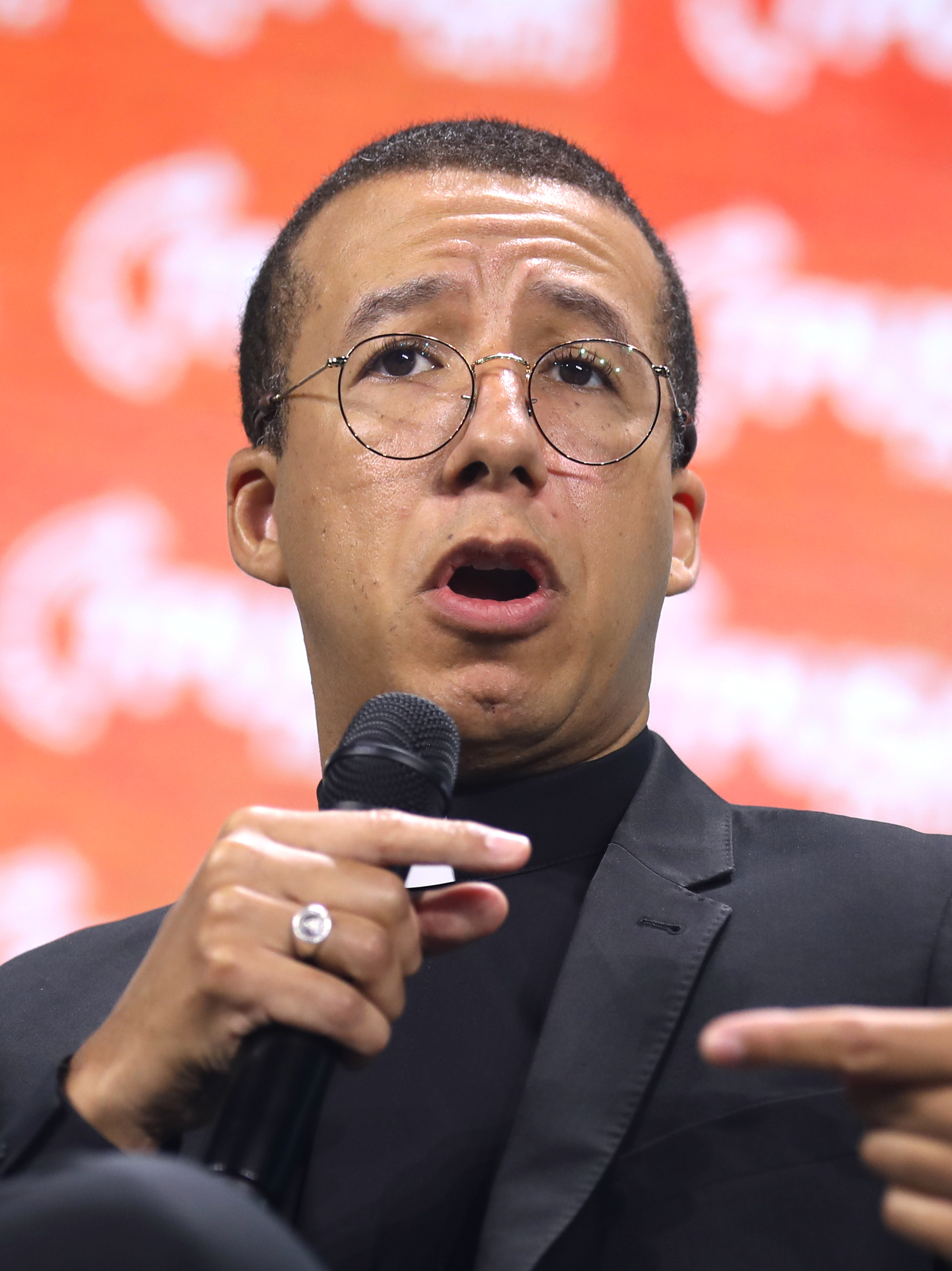
- Robinson in 2024

Personal details
- Born: Calvin John Robinson; 29 October 1985 (age 41) Mansfield, Nottinghamshire, England
- Denomination: Church of England (until 2022); Free Church of England (2022–2023); Nordic Catholic Church (2023–2024); Anglican Catholic Church (2024–2025); Reformed Episcopal Church in the ACNA (5–14 May 2025); English Catholic Church of North America (since 2025)
- Occupation: Political commentator; broadcaster
- Education: University of Westminster; St Stephen's House, Oxford

Ordination history
History
Diaconal ordination
- Ordained by: Paul Hunt (Free Church of England)
- Date: 25 June 2022
- Place: Christ Church, Harlesden
Priestly ordination
- Ordained by: Roald Nikolai Flemestad (Nordic Catholic Church)
- Date: 4 November 2023
- Place: St Jude's Church, Balham

Calvin John Robinson (born 29 October 1985) is a British right-wing political commentator, writer, broadcaster and priest. Previously, he worked as a computer science teacher at a secondary school and as a video games journalist.

As a political commentator, he is typically characterised as being a part of the Christian right, as well as conservative and right-wing. He is sometimes described as far-right, a label that he has rejected. Robinson has expressed antisemitic views, advocating for "driving out the Jews" from the United States. Up to 2021 he was a regular contributor to The Daily Telegraph, the Daily Mail and Spiked. Robinson also featured as a commentator on talkRADIO and presented a regular show on GB News until he was dismissed from the latter in 2023.

Robinson trained at St Stephen's House, Oxford, from 2020 with the hope of being ordained in the Church of England, but he was unsuccessful in his application for a curacy. In 2022, he was ordained as a deacon in the Free Church of England, a conservative Confessing Anglican denomination, which he left in 2023 to join the Nordic Catholic Church, a conservative Old Catholic denomination of high church Lutheran patrimony, which ordained him as a priest.

In 2024 he moved to the United States to become a priest in the Anglican Catholic Church, a Continuing Anglican denomination. The Anglican Catholic Church removed Robinson on 29 January 2025, four days after he ended a speech with a gesture which the church said had been widely interpreted as a "pro-Nazi salute", in an apparent reference to Elon Musk's similar gesture earlier that month. In May 2025, Robinson's parish voted to disaffiliate from the ACC, and he was granted a temporary licence by Bishop Ray Sutton of the Reformed Episcopal Church, part of the Anglican Church in North America. This was revoked nine days later after criticism from ACNA archbishop Steve Wood. In 2025, Robinson was temporarily incardinated as a priest in the English Catholic Church of North America, a Continuing Anglican denomination; he became permanently incardinated on 4 February 2026. He serves as rector of St Paul's Church of Grand Rapids, a congregation of the Christian Episcopal Church.

== Early life and education ==
Robinson is of mixed-race heritage. He describes his background as "half Afro-Caribbean and half English". His paternal grandparents emigrated from Jamaica as members of the Windrush generation. He was born and grew up in Mansfield, Nottinghamshire, attending High Oakham Primary School, The Brunts Academy, and later West Nottinghamshire College. He then studied at the University of Westminster where he graduated with a degree in computer games design and programming.

== Career ==
=== Educational career ===
Robinson was employed in the technology industry before training as a teacher. He taught computer science at St Mary's and St John's Church of England School in Hendon where he became head of the IT department. In 2017, Robinson was featured in a recruitment advert encouraging people to become teachers. He was a video games journalist and is also owner of the video games site God is a Geek.

Between 2019 and 2021, he was a school governor and trustee at the Michaela School in Wembley. In 2020, he was appointed to the education sub-committee of the board of the Royal Academy of Dance; Christian Concern reported on 1 October 2023 that Robinson had been "cancelled" from this role for opposing a drag queen storytelling session and had received an out-of-court settlement. He also became a senior fellow responsible for education policy at the Policy Exchange, a think tank with conservative precepts, but no longer held the position by 2023.

=== Political career ===
In 2016, Robinson was the Conservative Party candidate in a by-election for the Kilburn ward of Brent Council; he was defeated by the Labour Party candidate. In 2018 he stood as a Conservative for election to Camden Council in the Conservative-held Swiss Cottage ward; he was again defeated by Labour Party candidates.

Robinson was named as the Brexit Party candidate for Broxtowe in the 2019 general election, but the Brexit Party chose to not stand in seats won by the Conservatives in the previous election.

Robinson has also held various positions in right-wing political organisations and campaigns including Defund the BBC, Unite2Leave (a pro-Brexit tactical voting campaign), and Conservative Way Forward. He has contributed to Black Lives Matter UK: An Anthology, a Henry Jackson Society report opposing Black Lives Matter and "hard-left identity politics". Robinson said his commentary has made him the target of racial abuse. In 2023–24, he was associated with right-wing group Turning Point UK.

On 2 August 2024, he became the lead spokesman for the UK Independence Party (UKIP). On 2 December 2024, he was appointed as a director for UKIP.

By August 2026, Robinson had left UKIP, and was supporting Restore Britain.

=== Media career ===
Robinson worked for Talkradio and as a television presenter on GB News from late 2022, fronting a show called Calvin's Common Sense Crusade. In November 2022, he "appeared on the channel to amplify the false conspiracy theory that President Zelenskyy of Ukraine was using war as a front for a private money-laundering operation involving the bankrupt FTX crypto platform."

On 29 September 2023, Robinson was suspended from GB News after speaking out in favour of Dan Wootton, who had recently been suspended for misogynistic comments made on his show by Laurence Fox. Robinson's dismissal from GB News was announced on 4 October.

From February 2024 to July 2025, he hosted Common Sense Crusade, formerly a GB News programme, on the Lotus Eaters website, and was a recurring host on its podcast.

=== Ordained ministry ===
==== Church of England ====
Robinson undertook a two-year course of theological studies at St Stephen's House, Oxford, from 2020 to 2022, with the hope of being ordained a deacon in the Church of England. However, his application for a curacy in the Diocese of London was unsuccessful. He subsequently submitted a subject access request to the church to understand the decision. This revealed email conversations between Jonathan Baker, the bishop of Fulham, and Rob Wickham, the bishop of Edmonton, raising concerns about Robinson's "libertarian anti-woke, anti-identity politics, Covid-sceptical" political views and his use of social media, particularly Twitter, to disseminate them. The Diocese of London later issued a statement highlighting the "limited number of curacies available", emphasised that vacancies were carefully "considered on a case-by-case basis" and that "in this instance, it is felt that there is no suitable" curacy available that the diocese could offer. Robinson alleged that Sarah Mullally, the bishop of London, had blocked his ordination because of his political views, a claim which Mullally denied. The decision to deny ordination to Robinson attracted criticism from conservative elements of the media, and within the church, notably Angela Tilby, a canon emerita of Christ Church Cathedral, Oxford. Robinson described it as a "very narrow-minded" decision that was a result of his "anti-woke" views and criticism of "bleeding-heart liberal vicars".

==== Free Church of England ====
Robinson subsequently left the Church of England for the Free Church of England (FCE) in which he was ordained as a deacon on 25 June 2022 by Bishop Paul Hunt and appointed minister-in-charge at Christ Church, Harlesden.

==== Nordic Catholic Church ====
In October 2023 the Evening Standard reported that Robinson would soon leave the Free Church of England to seek priestly ordination in the Nordic Catholic Church (NCC), an Old Catholic denomination of Lutheran patrimony founded in 1999. Robinson was ordained to the priesthood by Bishop Roald Nikolai Flemestad of the Nordic Catholic Church at St Jude's Church, Balham, and celebrated his first Mass on 4 November 2023. He was therefore incardinated in the NCC and under the jurisdiction of Flemestad, who in turn operated under the authority of the prime bishop, Anthony Mikovsky. of the Polish National Catholic Church; both groups are part of the Union of Scranton. However, he continued to work as minister-in-charge of the Free Church of England parish of Christ Church Harlesden until 26 May 2024.

==== Anglican Catholic Church ====
Robinson left the United Kingdom and moved to the United States in September 2024, where he was formally incardinated in the Anglican Catholic Church, a continuing Anglican denomination which espouses a high church Anglo-Catholic theology. He was the priest-in-charge of St Paul's Anglican Catholic Church in Grand Rapids, Michigan.

==== Nazi salute controversy ====
On 25 January 2025, Robinson gave a speech at the National Pro-Life Summit in Washington, D.C. At the conclusion of his speech, he made a gesture that was described as a "pro-Nazi salute" in a statement released the same day by the Anglican Catholic Church. The church announced that Robinson's licence had been revoked and that he was no longer a priest of the ACC. The statement released by the church said that he had previously been "warned that online trolling and other such actions" were "incompatible with a priestly vocation and was told to desist". Robinson's gesture emulated that of Elon Musk earlier that month, which had resulted in controversy. Robinson has denied being a Nazi. On 20 February 2025, Robinson announced that his visa to reside in the United States had been revoked following his removal from the ACC's ministry. His visa was subsequently restored following an appeal. In March 2025, responding to the issue of ordination, the NCC released a letter of reprimand alleging that Robinson had made comments to "humiliate [their] bishop" and that he had broken promises made to the NCC.

==== Reformed Episcopal Church ====
On 4 May 2025, St Paul's parish voted to remove itself from the Anglican Catholic Church, and the parish website announced that it was "seeking another church body with which to affiliate". On 5 May, Ray Sutton, the bishop of the Diocese of Mid-America of the Reformed Episcopal Church, which is part of the Anglican Church in North America, temporarily licensed Robinson to serve as a priest at St Paul's. On 12 May, Steve Wood, the archbishop of the Anglican Church in North America, explained in a press release that Sutton had "agreed to provide personal oversight" to St Paul's Church while they searched for a new affiliation. Wood criticised Sutton's choice to temporarily license Robinson, stating that "I have concerns about Rev. Robinson’s ability to uphold the full commitments of our Anglican tradition, and his ability to model the Christ-like virtues of peace, patience, gentleness, goodness, and love", and that "I do not personally believe The Rev. Robinson is a good representative of the Anglican Church in North America." Robinson stated that "I know Bishop Ray Sutton to be a godly shepherd, and I am thankful that he has provided St. Paul's with Provisional Oversight and Pastoral Care, and me with Episcopal Sanctuary" and declined to comment on Archbishop Wood's remarks.

On 14 May 2025, two days after his licensure was criticised by Wood and nine days after its issuance, Sutton revoked the licence of Robinson after "much prayer and counsel from fellow bishops". Robinson posted on social media that "If even [Sutton] cannot find a place for me, even temporarily, perhaps God is sending me a message." He later deactivated his X account, but reactivated it the following day.

==== English Catholic Church of North America ====
In 2025, Robinson became licensed as a priest in the English Catholic Church of North America, a Continuing Anglican denomination formed in 2024; he became permanently incardinated in the church on 4 February 2026. Jayden Austin Matthew Hagood, bishop ordinary of the Archdiocese of the Midwest in the English Catholic Church, headquartered in Lincoln, Nebraska, announced on 4 February 2026 that Robinson had been received as a priest in the jurisdiction.

== Views ==
=== Political views ===
Robinson opposes the teaching of critical race theory in British education and argues that the teaching of black history and lessons concerning black people should be taught within the context of British history and not taught separately. He has also defended colonialism and the British Empire, and has opposed reparations for slavery.

In July 2021, Robinson appeared in an interview on Channel 4 News with the singer and left-wing political activist Billy Bragg on the decision of England's football team players to "take the knee" in a protest against racism. He said the action was "disgusting" and argued that, in taking the knee, the team was promoting "Black Lives Matter", which he described as "a neo-Marxist, anti-British, anti-family organisation".

Robinson was selected to stand for election in 2019 as a candidate for the Brexit Party in the Broxtowe constituency, but one month before the 2019 general election he was one of 317 Brexit Party candidates who withdrew from the contest in seats with Conservative Party incumbent MPs.

Robinson is hostile to Islam and states frequently that Britain is a Christian country. He stated in August 2024 that "we need to remove Islam from Britain".

Robinson's political views have been characterised as conservative, and as right-wing. He has been labelled "far right" by Hope not Hate and by Searchlight magazine, while Symon Hill writing in the Church Times described him as having excused far right violence, and the clergyman and writer Michael Coren has described him as "a hero and darling of the hard right". Reviewing Robinson's contribution to GB News, Alan Rusbridger described him as a conspiracy theorist who "lacked credibility". Robinson himself has rejected characterisations of his political views, describing the far-right label as "crazy", and described being labelled a conspiracy theorist as a "badge of honour".

Robinson has aligned himself with the Christian nationalist Joel Webbon, airing a programme on Webbon's network and regularly appearing on his podcast. In November 2026, Robinson spoke at the "Christ is King" conference hosted by Webbon alongside 10 other speakers including Alex Jones.

=== Theological views ===
In a 2022 interview with Premier Christianity, Robinson described himself as an Evangelical Catholic. The Catholic Herald described Robinson as an Evangelical Anglican, but also noted that he shares some high church positions, such as the use of the title "Father", holding a "high" understanding of the Eucharist and of the institution of the church by Christ. According to the Catholic Herald, Robinson considers as a mentor Michael Nazir-Ali, who served as a Church of England bishop and was later received into the Catholic Church. Robinson later became a founding member of the Anglo-Catholic Brotherhood of the Holy Trinity.

After being ordained to the priesthood, Robinson described himself as an "Old Catholic with Anglican patrimony", stating that he considers the Pope to be a primus inter pares, rejecting papal supremacy over the universal church, the First and Second Vatican Council and the dogmatic pronouncements of the Immaculate Conception and the Assumption of Mary, though he personally accepts the second as a pious devotion. He condemned the Protestant Reformation as a mistake that divided the church and stated that he is in favour of Christian unity and ecumenism among orthodox Christians.

He has spoken in favour of disestablishing the Church of England in order to free it from political influence and allow Anglican realignment churches to thrive. Robinson himself was a deacon in the Free Church of England from 2022 to 2023. He is strongly critical of the leadership of the Church of England, accusing it of liberal political bias.

Robinson opposes the ordination of women.

=== Social views ===
Robinson is opposed to the facilitation of same-sex marriage in the Church of England and has argued that the Bible only allows marriage between a man and a woman. He argues that premarital sex is a sin. He opposes abortion and holds pro-life positions.

Robinson received the Boniface Award from the Association of Classical Christian Schools in 2025. The award is given to recognize "a public figure who has stood faithfully for Christian truth, beauty, and goodness with grace."

=== Antisemitism ===
Searchlight has suggested that Robinson's views on Judaism and Jews as a people have become antisemitic. They quote his former church in Michigan saying he was using "rhetoric that was clearly and intentionally anti-Semitic", and highlighted his use of the term "noticing" - used in online antisemitic circles as a code for "becoming aware of the supposed extent to which Jews control 'government, culture, the media, finance, etc.'" Archbishop Mark Haverland, in a letter explaining Robinson's expulsion from the Anglican Catholic Church, wrote that “At best [Robinson] is gravely intemperate and has poor judgment. At worst he is toying with anti-Semitism and engages in the deeply uncharitable activity of trolling and political provocation.” Robinson had previously written to Haverland that he was “not antisemitic or a holocaust denier.”

In December 2025, Robinson said that “There are too many perverted Jews running society. We see the porn industry run by Jews. We see Hollywood run by Jews. We see the music industry run by Jews… And it’s all perverted. It’s subverting our culture. It’s an inversion of morality.”

In February 2026, Robinson posted to his X account screenshots of an exchange with Grok, a large language model-based chatbot, in which the chatbot purported to compare the number of people still alive from the Second World War with the number of Holocaust survivors, captioning the post: "The math ain’t mathing." The figures presented by Grok were inaccurate, and the post prompted accusations of Holocaust minimisation or denial.

In another post on X, on 18 September 2026, Robinson wrote: "It is the Jews. It has always been the Jews. Not all of them, but always them," as well as "There is no avoiding this truth. Everything else is a distraction. Once you notice, you cannot unsee." He then listed Marxism, communism, socialism, Bolshevism, feminism, liberalism, libertarianism, anarchism, psychoanalysis, critical theories, neoconservatism and Zionism.

In November 2026, on the programme of white nationalist Joe Enders, Robinson called for the expulsion of Jews from the United States in response to Enders complaining about a "Jewish oligarchy ... permeating the highest levels of our government". Robinson said that "We can talk about mass deportation of Mohammedans and other peoples that are contradictory to our own way of life in Christendom, but we can't discuss it in terms of the Jews. I think driving out the Jews is the answer." In response to this, the American Association of Jewish Lawyers and Jurists called on the federal government to review Robinson's visa status.
