= The Best of N.E.R.D. =

Greatest hits album by N.E.R.D.
- Released: January 11, 2011
- Length: 1:04:27
- Label: Virgin
- Producer: The Neptunes

The Best of N.E.R.D. is a greatest hits album by American rock and hip-hop band N.E.R.D. It was released on January 11, 2011, through Virgin Records.

== Critical reception ==
Professional ratings
Review scores
Source	Rating
AllMusic	2.5/5 stars
Pitchfork	4/10
PopMatters	2/10
Rolling Stone	3.5/5 stars
Spectrum Culture	3.4/5

Andy Kellman of AllMusic called it a "poorly-selected compilation covering only half the group's discography". Tom Breihan of Pitchfork described it as both a "fun and sometimes frustrating listen" and "one that has absolutely no reason to exist". Chris Conaton of PopMatters said that "there is no reason to buy this album" while also describing it as having "absolutely no value". James Hunter of Rolling Stone called it a "demonstration of genre shakes, sonic spectacle and fun". Chaz Kangas of Spectrum Culture described its aim as "seek[ing] only to appease the most casual of N.E.R.D. fans". Scott Kirk of The Westmorland Gazette said that "nobody should release a CD like this unless they've had at least four or five big albums".
