= Inaya Folarin Iman =

British television presenter (born 1996)

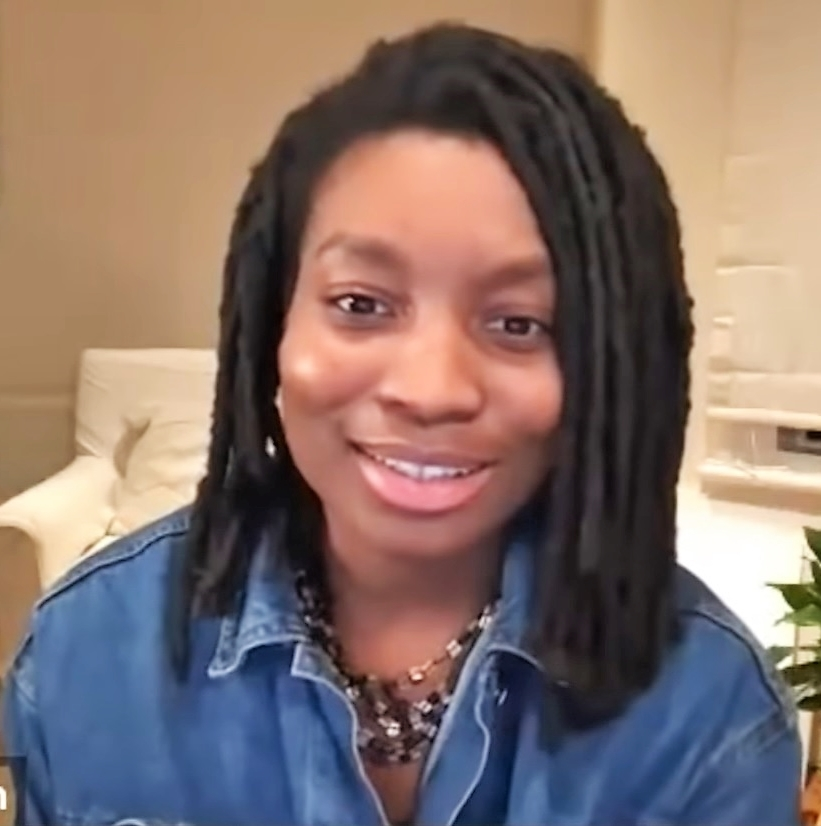
- Iman in 2021
- Born: Inaya Folarin Iman; 8 November 1996 (age 29); Tooting, London, England
- Education: University of Leeds (BA)
- Notable credits: Founder of the Equiano Project; GB News host

Inaya Folarin Iman (born 8 November 1996) is a British journalist, commentator and reporter for CBS news. She is former panelist on the BBC Radio show Moral Maze, and television presenter who has presented for GB News. She is also the director and founder of the Equiano Project (named after abolitionist Olaudah Equiano), which describes itself as "a debate, discussion and ideas forum" that "focus[es] on race, culture and politics".

A 2023 conference held by the organisation was described as a "wonderful and inspiring gathering" by Ian Leslie. In September 2021, she was appointed as a trustee for the National Portrait Gallery in London.

Iman was signed by GB News, a news channel that began broadcasting in June 2021. On the channel, she hosted a weekly culture and politics show, The Discussion, which aired every Sunday until May 2022. In 2023, Iman became a regular panellist for the BBC Radio 4 programme Moral Maze.

== Early life ==
Born in Tooting, south London, England, in 1996, Iman is the daughter of Mobolaji Atinuke Anike. She is of Nigerian descent. She was educated at Hockerill Anglo-European College in Hertfordshire, St John Fisher Roman Catholic School in Chatham, Tonbridge Grammar School, and the University of Leeds, where she gained a BA degree in Arabic and International Relations in 2019.

== Political views ==
A supporter of Britain's withdrawal from the EU and a former Brexit Party candidate, Iman was a founding board member of the Free Speech Union and was a former project manager for Index on Censorship.

Iman has criticised Black Lives Matter, seeing the movement as an "opportunistic pretext for an outpouring of self-righteous rage". Following the murder of George Floyd, Iman criticised comparisons between black people's experiences in the United Kingdom and the United States. Alongside Andrew Doyle, Claire Fox and others, she was co-signator of a letter in The Spectator which said that "activists, corporations and institutions seem to have seized the opportunity to exploit Floyd's death to promote an ideological agenda that threatens to undermine British race relations. ... We must oppose and expose the racial division being sown in the name of anti-racism." She has also criticised gestures such as "taking the knee" against racism, which she sees as part of a culture war.

Writing for Spiked, she rejected the claims of BLM that Britain is a racist society, saying that in the UK, "racial equality is near achieved and so-called structural racism has been almost totally eradicated".

She has written for The Daily Telegraph, the Daily Mail, Spiked, and other national publications. She regularly features and makes appearances on Politics Live, The Big Questions, Sky News, Good Morning Britain, Sunday Morning Live, and Question Time.
