= Patrick Christys =

British journalist and presenter

Patrick Michael Christys
- Born: 21 February 1992 (age 34); Wythenshawe, Manchester, England
- Occupations: Journalist and presenter
- Years active: 2014–present
- Employer: GB News
- Spouse: Emily Carver (m. 2024)
- Children: 1

Patrick Christys (born 21 February 1992) is a British journalist and presenter. He hosts Patrick Christys Tonight on GB News.

== Career ==
Christys worked as a journalist for The Westmorland Gazette, a newspaper published in Kendal, Cumbria, from 2014 to 2016.

In August 2021, Christys joined GB News, initially presenting To the Point alongside Mercy Muroki. Former GB News chairman Andrew Neil, who left the channel in September 2021, criticised the appointments of Christys and Mark Dolan, calling them "shock jocks". In November 2023, in light of the suspension of weekday primetime presenter Dan Wootton, it was announced that Christys would be presenting Wootton's weekday 9 pm Tonight programme on GB News until further notice.

Christys has also appeared as a political commentator and contributor on the BBC's Politics Live and Sky News.

== Charitable activities ==
In June 2023, he performed with the Dreamboys to raise awareness of men's mental health, generating over £110,000 in donations for mental health charity Mind.

In November 2023, Christys raised over £270,000 for the Royal British Legion as part of its Poppy Appeal.

In November 2024, Christys raised £407,000 (£71,236 of that in Gift Aid) for UK charity Friends of the Elderly.

== Controversies ==
In July 2024, Patrick Christys received criticism following a GB News segment on Labour's devolution plans in which he referenced footage that was incorrectly presented as showing Brighton and Hove mayor Mohammed Asaduzzaman. The footage shown was of a different Muslim man unrelated to Asaduzzaman. Christys also incorrectly identified the mayoral role as regional rather than ceremonial. After the clip aired, Christys questioned whether greater powers should be held by "people like that". In response, the leader of Brighton Council, Bella Sankey, called the clip "racist garbage." Christys later apologised for misidentifying Asaduzzaman and for inaccurately portraying his role.

In June 2025, Christys, who was on a GB News segment featuring Lewis Schaffer, was criticised for failing to challenge the remarks of Schaffer who suggested that disabled people should be killed off, either by starvation or by shooting them. Christys responded to Schaffer by joking "Yeah, it's just not allowed these days."

== Personal life ==
Christys married another GB News presenter, Emily Carver in 2024. Their son was born in September 2025.
