= Ben Leo =

British journalist (born 1989)

Ben Leo (born 25 August 1989) is a British journalist and broadcaster known for his work with GB News and formerly The Sun newspaper.

== Journalism career ==
Leo began his journalism career at The Argus newspaper in Brighton, where he gained recognition for his investigative reporting. His work on the dangers of fixed odds betting terminals led to significant regulatory changes in the gambling industry. In 2014, he was named the UK's Young Journalist of the Year at the Regional Press Awards.

In 2016 Leo joined The Sun newspaper as a reporter covering Brexit, the royal wedding between the Duke and Duchess of Sussex, the disappearance of Madeleine McCann and various terror attacks including the London Bridge massacre in 2017.

Leo arrived on the scene shortly after the attack in Borough Market by three Islamists who killed eight people. In a report for The Sun, he described counting bodies strewn over the pavement and told how he saw stricken Australian victim Sara Zelenak bleeding to death after having her throat cut by an attacker.

In 2022, Leo joined GB News as a producer for Dan Wootton Tonight. He eventually progressed to on-screen roles, including appearances as a stand-in for Breakfast host Eamonn Holmes. In December 2024, it was announced that Leo would replace Mark Dolan on his weekend show.

He hosted Ben Leo Tonight which aired weekends from 9 to 11 pm from early 2025 to August of that year and co-hosted Britain's Newsroom on Fridays from 9:30 am to midday from 2023 to 2025.

In August 2025, Leo announced he was relocating to America, in a post on X. From September, he'll be reporting for GB News across the country and fronting the channel's new US show 'The Late Show Live' alongside colleague and fellow host, Beverley Turner. This comes as the channel seeks to broaden its operations in the US market.

In January 2026, it was announced that Leo would be remaining in America as host of The Late Show Live in addition to a new role as Chief US Correspondent for GB News - the first in the channel's history.
