= Christopher Hope =

Christopher Hope may refer to:

- Chris Hope (American football) (born 1980), American football safety
- Chris Hope (footballer) (born 1972), English footballer
- Christopher Hope (journalist) (born 1971), British journalist
- Christopher Hope (novelist) (born 1944), South African novelist and poet
- Christopher J. Hope, father of internet personality Lil Tay
