= Taste (TV series) =

- Title-card
- Genre: Food and cooking show
- Developed by: Prospect Pictures for BSkyB
- Directed by: Ashley S. Gorman; Katharine Townrow
- Presented by: Beverley Turner
- Country of origin: United Kingdom
- Original language: English
- No. of series: 1
- No. of episodes: 65

Production
- Executive producers: Janice Gabriel; Hannah Wyatt
- Producers: Michael Connock; Moira Ross
- Production locations: Capital Studios, Wandsworth, London
- Editors: Keren Aarons; John Bisset; Aaron Jamieson; Charlie Phillips; John Williams
- Running time: 1 hour (45 min without adverts)

Original release
- Network: Sky One, Sky Two, Sky Three
- Release: 10 October 2005 – 6 January 2006

Taste was a cookery television programme which first aired in the United Kingdom on Sky One in 2005. The show has had sixty-five (65) 1 hour-long episodes (45 minutes without adverts) since October 2005, and was presented by Beverley Turner, together with accompanying guest chefs. It was subsequently repeated on Sky Two.

In the early hours of weekday mornings it was repeated on Sky Three, all recipes on the show could be found on the show's website.

Chefs appearing on the show included Jean-Christophe Novelli, Marcus Wareing, Richard Phillips, Ed Baines, Paul Bloxham, Gino D'Acampo, Merrilees Parker, and Ching-He Huang.
