= Colin Shelbourn =

British cartoonist and writer

Colin Shelbourn is a British cartoonist and writer. His single-panel cartoon has appeared on the front page of the Westmorland Gazette newspaper since 1984. He is the author of a number of books, including Rocky Rambler's Wild Walker, co-written with Iain Peters which won the 1993 Lakeland Book of the Year award.

Shelbourn acted as author Hunter Davies' chief researcher for the early editions of The Good Guide to the Lakes.

== Selected books ==
- Rocky Rambler's Wild Walks: The First Lake District Walking Guide to Put the Children in Charge (Cicerone Press, 1993 ISBN 9781852843472)
- Waterside Walks in the Lake District (Sigma Leisure, 2004, ISBN 9781850588054)
- Drawing Cartoons (Crowood Press, 2010, ISBN 9781847971722)
