= Christopher Hope (journalist) =

British journalist (born 1971)

- Born: 24 October 1971 (age 54); Liverpool, Merseyside, England
- Education: University of Bristol (BA); Cardiff University (MA)
- Occupation: Journalist
- Employer: GB News
- Notable work: Chopper's Politics
- Spouse: Sarah Hope (m. 1999)
- Children: 3
- Website: Christopher Hope

Christopher Hope (born 24 October 1971) is a British journalist. He is Head of Politics and Political Editor at GB News. Nicknamed Chopper, he presented The Daily Telegraph's weekly interview podcast Chopper's Politics. He previously worked for twenty years as The Telegraph's chief political correspondent, assistant editor and associate editor (politics).

== Early life ==
Hope was born on 24 October 1971 in Liverpool, England. His parents are Michael and Caroline Hope. He was educated at Shrewsbury School. From his childhood onward he wanted to become a journalist, and he did work experience on his local newspapers the Formby Times and the Formby and Southport Globe. He attended the University of Bristol, studying Politics and International Relations, before going to the Cardiff School of Journalism, Media and Cultural Studies to undertake a postgraduate degree in journalism.

== Career ==
Hope left Cardiff in 1995. He joined PrintWeek in January 1997 and has also worked for Construction News, The Scotsman and The Herald.

In 2001 Hope helped found a daily financial newspaper in Scotland, Business AM, which folded the following year. He was hired by The Daily Telegraph's City editor Neil Collins in 2003 to be part of its business team, in which he was business correspondent and industry editor. In 2008 he was promoted from home affairs editor to Whitehall editor, thus entering the politics team, and subsequently moved to the role of senior political correspondent. He was part of the team of Daily Telegraph journalists that broke the news of the parliamentary expenses scandal. He claims to have coined the term flipping to denote the alleged practice of MPs re-designating second homes.

Hope co-wrote the book Conundrum with Richard Bacon, a detailed account of the failings of UK public sector and government projects.

In 2013 he was chairman of the Parliamentary Press Gallery.

Chopper was booed and jeered at the UK Independence Party (UKIP) 2015 general election campaign launch after asking about why the only black face on the party's manifesto was on the overseas aid page. Some of the party's supporters accused him of racism on social media after the launch ended. James Kirkup wrote that "the party's actions could have a chilling effect on journalistic scrutiny" and called on UKIP to apologise for Hope's "disgraceful treatment".

In 2019 and 2020 he was chairman of the Lobby.

In an interview in 2019 he clarified his and The Telegraph's relationship with Prime Minister and former columnist Boris Johnson.

Hope's suggestion of a Brexit 50p coin led to the coin being minted.

Hope was formerly The Daily Telegraph's chief political correspondent and assistant editor. He has presented the BBC Radio 4 programme Week in Westminster.

Hope was The Daily Telegraph's associate editor (politics), where he also wrote the weekly Peterborough diary. From March 2017 to July 2023 he presented Chopper's Politics (originally titled Chopper's Brexit Podcast), a weekly podcast featuring interviews with politicians and commentators which ran for 368 episodes.

In February 2023, it was announced that Hope would be leaving The Telegraph after 20 years, and joining GB News as Head of Politics and Political Editor. He had his leaving event on 6 July at The Albert, Victoria.

== Personal life ==
Hope married Sarah by February 1999. They have one son, Barnaby, and two daughters, Sapphire and Pollyanna. They had a Jack Russell named Queenie from 2008 until her death on 9 June 2025.

Pollyanna is a student at London Contemporary Dance School, having had a ballet-specific prosthetic leg fitted; she featured in the Toyota advertising campaign for the 2022 Winter Olympics and 2022 Winter Paralympics.

In April 2007, Hope found that his family had been hit by a bus in South London, leaving Sarah badly injured and killing her mother Elizabeth. Their daughter Pollyanna lost her right leg in the crash, leading Sarah and her sister to create Elizabeth's Legacy of Hope, a charity devoted to helping young amputees in developing countries. Hope and Sarah moved to Norfolk after the crash, and were affected in the long-term through suffering from post-traumatic stress disorder. The bus driver was found guilty of causing death by dangerous driving and jailed for four years. In April 2016, Transport for London launched the Sarah Hope Line to provide advice and support to people affected by serious incidents on London's transport network.

Tim Shipman, a fellow journalist and friend, helped give Hope the nickname Chopper.

== Bibliography ==
- Bacon, Richard; Hope, Christopher (2013). Conundrum: Why every government gets things wrong and what we can do about it. Biteback Publishing. ISBN 978-1849545525.
