= British musicians =

British musicians may refer to:

- List of music artists and bands from England
- List of Scottish musicians
- List of Welsh musicians

== See also ==
- Category:Lists of British musicians
