= Bev Turner =

British television and radio presenter (born 1973)

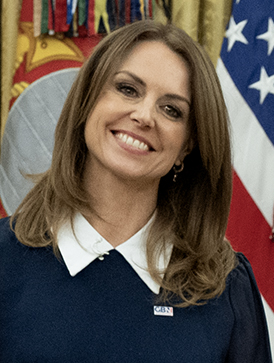
- Turner in 2025
- Born: Beverley Turner; 21 October 1973 (age 53); Prestwich, Lancashire, England
- Education: University of Manchester (BA)
- Occupations: Television presenter, radio presenter
- Spouse: James Cracknell (m. 2002; div. 2019)
- Children: 3
- Website: www.thebevturner.co.uk

Beverley Turner (born 21 October 1973) is an English television and radio presenter. She was formerly the presenter of The Late Show Live in Washington D.C. for GB News reporting on US & UK news and returned to GB News, London studios in October 2026, following the completion of her year-long secondment in the USA.

== Early life ==
Turner was born in Prestwich, Lancashire. She has a first-class degree in English literature and language from the University of Manchester. She is the sister of Olympic swimmer Adrian Turner.

== Career ==
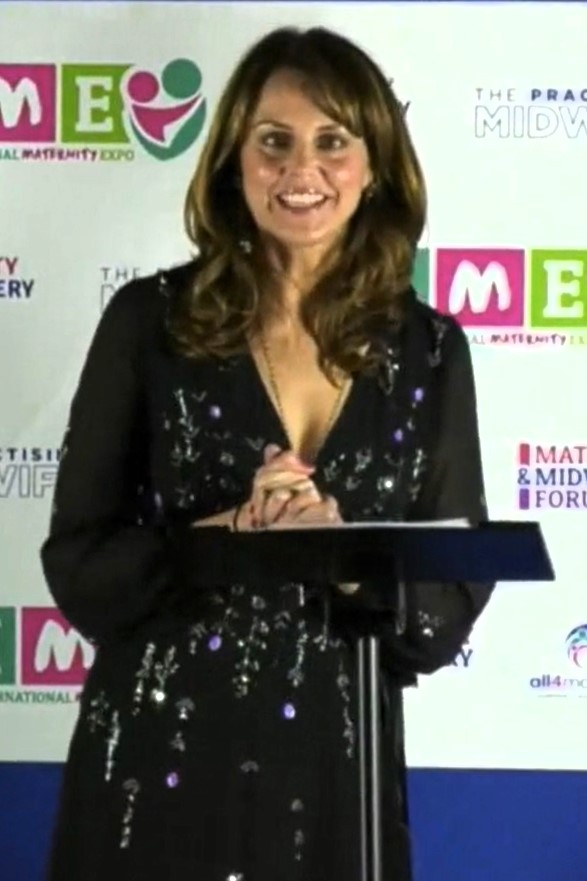
Turner at the International Maternity Expo Awards 2019

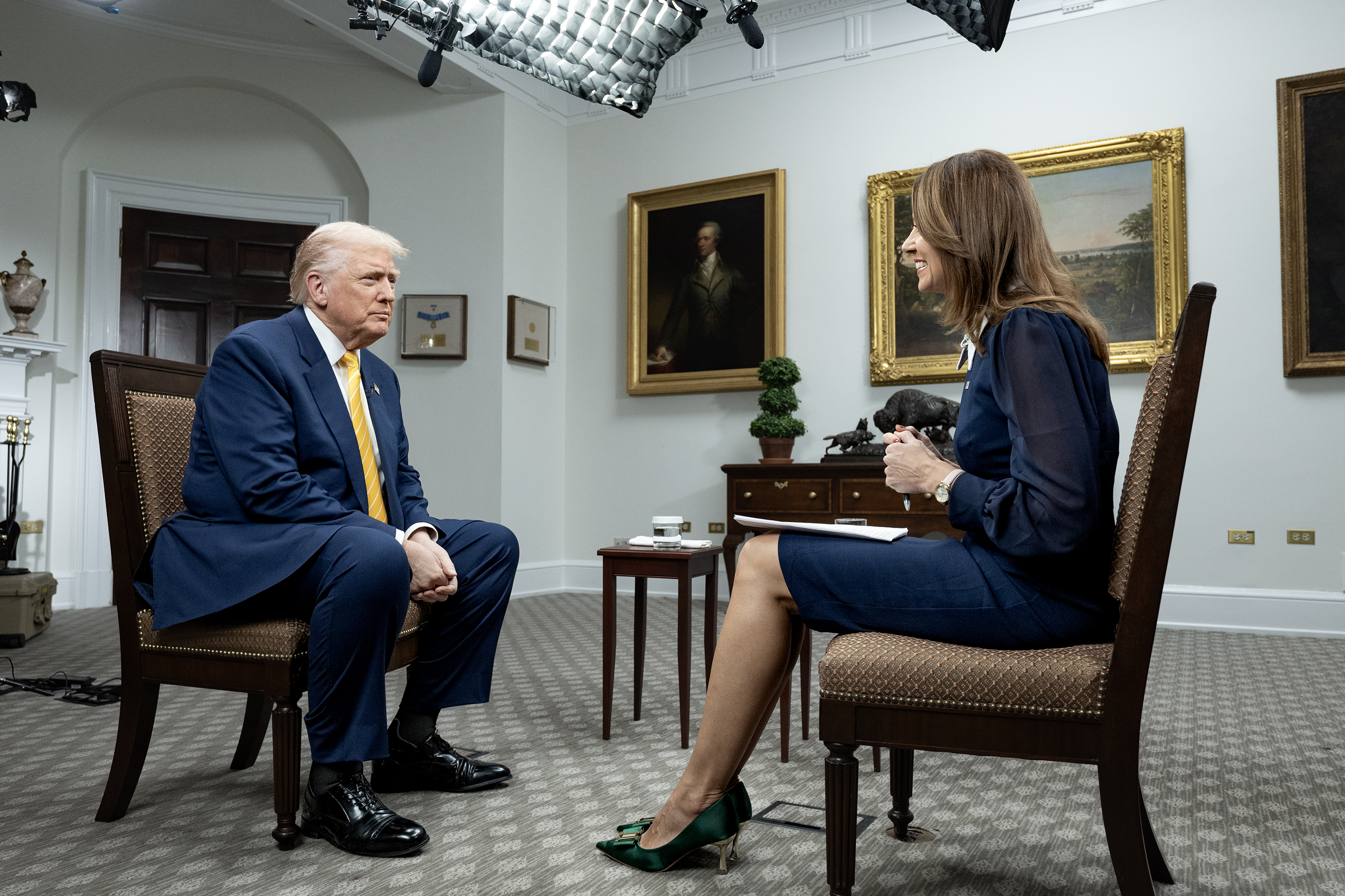
Turner interviewing US President Donald Trump in November 2025

Turner worked for BBC Radio 5 Live, presenting their Bump Club series, following a group of pregnant women through to motherhood. Previously, she spent three years as one of only two female reporters for ITV's Formula One coverage and also presented coverage of the Tour de France. She took part in a 2-seater Minardi F1 race at Donington Park as the passenger of 1996 World Champion Damon Hill and they finished 3rd. She broke with Formula One racing coverage with a "bridge burning exercise" in the form of her book, The Pits: The Real World of Formula 1 in July 2004, which described widespread sexism in the sport. She spent another three seasons presenting coverage of US National Basketball Association games in the UK. In 2002, she began presenting entertainment sections for Granada's This Morning and, in 2003, travel reporting for the Travel Channel.

She was the sole presenter of sixty-four episodes of Taste, a cooking programme for Sky1 which was shown daily for six years across global Sky channels and became one of the station's most profitable self-made shows. She co-presented Homes Live with Watchdog's Matt Allwright, a daily, live property show on BBC Two.

Turner hosted her own talk show on the radio station LBC from 2015 to 2019, and at the time of her departure was one of two female presenters at the station. She left the station in January 2019 after complaining that the station predominantly employed white men; LBC reported that her contract had expired and was not renewed.

From November 2022, Turner began hosting her own weekday show on GB News, titled Bev Turner Today. She had previously been a stand-in presenter on the channel.

In January 2023, Turner received the "Aspirational Public Figure of the Year" award at the Inspiration Awards for Women, recognising her work as a broadcaster and advocate for free speech.

She has written for newspapers The Independent, The Daily Telegraph and the Daily Mail.

Turner previously hosted the Washington edition of The Late Show Live, a late-night GB News programme from September 2025, to the end of September 2026, her successor Tom Harwood replaced her on secondment in October, for the Monday through Thursday show, which focuses on the latest American news and events. Turner is scheduled to present from the GB News, London Studios going forward.

== Personal life ==
Turner married double Olympic Gold medallist rower James Cracknell at Clearwell Castle in Gloucestershire in 2002. They have a son, born in September 2003, and two daughters, born in March 2009 and April 2011. They announced their separation in April 2019, and were granted a decree nisi in their divorce proceedings in July of the same year.

Since 2019, Turner has been in a relationship with property developer James Pritchett.

== Controversies ==
On 1 June 2021, Turner clashed with Dermot O'Leary on This Morning over the issue of COVID-19 vaccines, when she said that it was not effective and urged younger people to refuse the vaccine when offered it. She went on to say: "It does not stop you catching or passing on the virus." Following this, she was banned from appearing on the programme. Controversy continued later on Jeremy Vine, which caused Ofcom to receive hundreds of complaints. She later shared a video of herself crying, saying she had been "ambushed". In November of the same year, she appeared again on the Jeremy Vine programme, in which she clashed with Owen Jones when she compared Australian lockdown rules for the non-vaccinated to apartheid.

On 7 February 2022, in the hours after Labour leader Sir Keir Starmer was encircled by protesters yelling "traitor", with references to Jimmy Savile, amongst other things, Turner tweeted to suggest that Starmer was complicit in the incident and that the event was staged. Turner tweeted: "I'm not at all convinced this is a genuine 'ambush.' It perfectly casts Johnson as a Trumpian agitator. (I'm not condoning his Savile comment. It was stupid). But Starmer does not look scared. Yelling about 'Freemasons' was brainstormed in a board room! Why walk so far?! Staged."

Amidst the July 2022 United Kingdom heat wave, in a conversation with the BBC's meteorologist John Hammond, she said "I want us to be happy about the weather, and I don't know if something has happened to meteorologists to make you all a little bit fatalistic and harbingers of doom, but broadcasters – particularly on the BBC – every time I've turned on, anyone is talking about the weather and they're saying there’s going to be tons of fatalities, but haven't we always had hot weather, John?" in a moment that was compared to the film Don't Look Up. On her Twitter account, she has expressed her opinion about the extreme heat warnings, calling them "weather-fear porn" and "climate lockdown".

In July 2023, a leading Jewish group criticised Turner for spreading a "dangerous conspiracy theory" after she tweeted that the COVID-19 virus appeared to have been bioengineered to be less dangerous to some Jewish people.

In September 2023, when allegations about Russell Brand's abuse and sexual assault of women were made public by Channel 4's Dispatches programme, Turner defended Brand on Twitter and clashed with Andrew Pierce live on GB News. Turner responded to Pierce's branding of her dismissal of the alleged victims' testimonies as "shameful" by saying she had been in contact with several sources "close to Brand [and] close to The Times" which had led her to believe the allegations to be "flimsy."

In November 2025, she interviewed Donald Trump, making statements such as, "I almost don't know what you're going to do in the next few years. You've done so much in such a short space of time." and "You've had a phenomenal success with solving conflicts" and "You're obviously a really good dad." The interview was later described as it "wasn’t journalism’s finest hour" by then-current OFCOM chairman Michael Grade. It is currently (as of May 2026) being investigated by OFCOM for breaching broadcasting rules.

In June 2026, regarding the 2026 Northern Ireland riots, Bev Turner stated on GB News in a discussion with Matthew Stadlen, "There was no riot, there is not a house that has been burnt down". This comment contradicted her own reporter on the ground, Charlie Peters, who had described earlier in the program, “houses being evacuated after they had been set on fire” and “families putting all of their possessions into cars before rushing and driving off” – with Turner herself in the anchor chair receiving that report from Belfast.

== Other interests ==
Turner's main charity interest is in sexual health and sexual politics, and she is a patron of the Family Planning Association (FPA). She is also an honorary associate of the National Secular Society.

She has been a competitive swimmer, and appeared in FHM's "Sexiest Women" list at position 43 in 2001. Turner has also studied for a Diploma in Psychotherapy and Hypnotherapy.
