= Turbo cancer =

Anti-vaccination myth

Turbo cancer is an anti-vaccination conspiracy theory alleging that people vaccinated against COVID-19, especially with mRNA vaccines, are suffering from a high incidence of fast-developing cancers. Although the idea has been spread by a number of vaccine opponents, including several health professionals, turbo cancer is not supported by cancer research, and there is no evidence that COVID-19 vaccination causes or worsens cancer.

== Claims ==
Opponents of COVID-19 vaccines such as Florida surgeon general Joseph Ladapo have claimed that trace amounts of contaminant DNA present alongside the vaccine's mRNA could integrate in the patient's genome, activating oncogenes responsible for cancer. In response, Céline Gounder pointed out that trace DNA exists in virtually every product originating from cell cultures, and that DNA vaccines are not known to cause cancer despite containing much higher amounts of DNA. According to the US National Cancer Institute, "[t]here is no evidence that COVID-19 vaccines cause cancer, lead to recurrence, or lead to disease progression. Furthermore, COVID-19 vaccines do not change your DNA".

== Examples of claims ==
A paper by antivaccine activists Stephanie Seneff, Peter McCullough and others claimed suppression of type 1 interferon could result in immune suppression that could promote cancer proliferation. The study suggested hypothetical disease mechanisms linking mRNA vaccines to various pathologies through immune suppression. It used only anecdotal reports from VAERS as evidence, and was described by Jeffrey Morris as "shifting the burden of proof" by asking public health institutions to either prove the impossibility of these mechanisms or accept them.

Similarly, a Frontiers in Oncology paper discussing a laboratory mouse dying of lymphoma after being injected with the Pfizer–BioNTech COVID-19 vaccine was claimed to prove the existence of turbo cancer. However, the study in question did not claim any causality between the two events. Notably, the type of mouse used in the study had a higher predisposition to sarcomas and lymphomas, with that specific individual having shown signs of preexisting cancer such as weight loss before the vaccine injection. The setup of the study was also criticized, as it differed from human vaccinations in the method of injection (intravenous rather than intramuscular) and dose in proportion to body weight (480 to 600 times higher). The authors later added that their findings were "largely misinterpreted".
