= PrintWeek =

British trade journal

- Cover of the June/July 2023 issue
- Editor: Darryl Danielli
- Categories: Trade magazine
- Frequency: Fortnightly
- Founded: 1958
- Company: Mark Allen Group
- Country: United Kingdom
- Based in: London
- Language: English
- Website: www.printweek.com

PrintWeek is a UK print-related magazine and website. It covers print industry-specific subject matter, particularly the equipment and business sides of the sector. The fortnightly magazine focuses on industry news and printing equipment, and it also produces daily newspapers for industry exhibitions and runs its own awards. It also produces a range of supplements including the Top 500, listing the best performing companies in the sector and Buyers' guide, cataloguing the products available. It was originally called Litho Week.

== History and profile ==
PrintWeek was started in 1958. The title is published by Mark Allen Group which acquired it in April 2013. Then the frequency of the magazine was changed to fortnightly. It was published on a weekly basis until that date. The headquarters is in south east London.

PrintWeek has as well a number of international sister magazines including PrintWeek India, PrintWeek MEA as well as the German magazine Druck & Medien and ProPrint in Australia. The PrintWeek website also has a large international audience while in the UK accounts for 80% of traffic in its market.
