= The Westmorland Gazette =

Weekly newspaper in United Kingdom

- Type: Weekly newspaper
- Owner: Newsquest Media Group
- Editor: Vanessa Sims
- Founded: 23 May 1818; 207 years ago
- Circulation: 6,579 (as of 2024)
- Website: thewestmorlandgazette.co.uk

The Westmorland Gazette is a weekly newspaper published in Kendal, England, covering "South Lakeland and surrounding areas", including Barrow and North Lancashire. Its name refers to the historic county of Westmorland. The paper is now owned by the Newsquest group, forming part of Westmorland Gazette Newspapers, which includes the weekly freesheet South Lakes Citizen and other titles. It has an office in Ulverston in addition to its Kendal base. The circulation is about 7,500. It changed from broadsheet to compact format in August 2009. The editor, Vanessa Sims, also edits Cumbrian titles the Mail, the News & Star, The Cumberland News, the Whitehaven News, and the Times & Star.

== History ==
The newspaper was founded on 23 May 1818. Among its early editors was Thomas De Quincey, who was in post from July 1818 until his resignation in November 1819. Under his editorship, the newspaper covered topics such as contemporary philosophy. It has been suggested that De Quincey's interests were too esoteric for the readership of the Gazette, but the main reason for his departure seems to have been doubt about his reliability. He was living at Dove Cottage, some miles away from Kendal. A drug addict, De Quincey used to take laudanum there, as he recalled in his autobiographical work Confessions of an English Opium-Eater. The proprietors complained in July 1819 of "their dissatisfaction with the lack of 'regular communication between the Editor and the Printer'".

William Wordsworth wrote many letters for publication in the paper, and had been invited to be its editor; other notable correspondents included John Ruskin and Beatrix Potter.

From 1963 the newspaper was the publisher of Alfred Wainwright's books A Pictorial Guide to the Lakeland Fells. The series was taken over by Michael Joseph after the author's death.

The paper has carried a front-page single-panel cartoon by Colin Shelbourn since 1984. Former journalists include true crime author Jeremy Craddock and GB News presenter Patrick Christys.

In 2007 The Times reported that a minor news story in the Westmorland Gazette, describing the fire brigade's attendance to extinguish a burning chair, had received much commentary. The editor, Mike Glover, was quoted as saying: "This is not the most crime-ridden or busiest of areas, and it's difficult to get much material from calls to the police and fire brigade. We took the the [sic] attitude that local news sells local newspapers. People will have wondered what the fire brigade were doing."
