= Mercy Muroki =

Kenyan-British researcher and television presenter

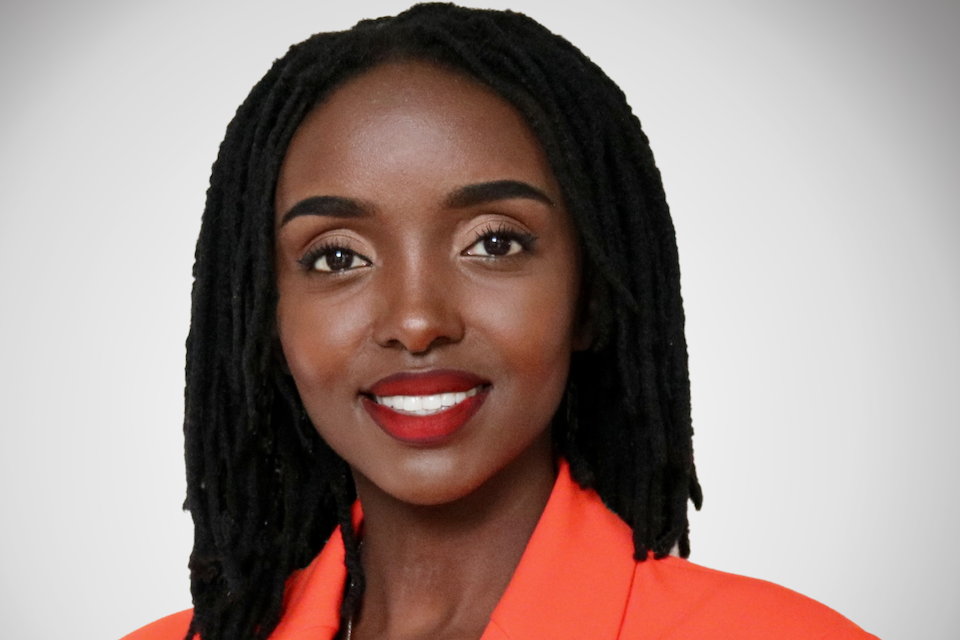
Official government portrait, 2023

Mercy Muroki is a Kenyan-British researcher, journalist, and television presenter. She was a member of the UK government's Commission on Race and Ethnic Disparities in 2021. In the same year, she began presenting on GB News, as well as writing columns for tabloid newspaper The Sun.

== Early life, education and research ==
Muroki was born in Kenya and moved to West London at the age of five. She became a mother at 18 and while claiming Universal Credit, she studied Politics at Queen Mary University of London from 2015 to 2018 and graduated with a first. She completed a Master of Science degree in Comparative Social Policy at Jesus College, Oxford, from 2019 to 2021. Muroki was the youngest of the researchers appointed on the Commission on Race and Ethnic Disparities, which made the conclusion in 2021 that British society is not institutionally racist. In 2023, Muroki became a policy adviser for the Minister for Women and Equalities Kemi Badenoch.

== Media work and views ==
Muroki is a columnist for The Sun newspaper, where she has expressed conservative views, including criticism of the Labour Party, who she has claimed demonise black and female conservatives, as well as "anti-woke" views. She has also written for The Times, where she has argued that black Conservatives are demonised by the Labour Party, and that "politics of class and victimhood" hold back black youth.

Muroki was signed by GB News, which began broadcasting in June 2021. On the channel, she co-hosted Brazier & Muroki, Monday to Friday, 9 am to 12 pm, with veteran anchor Colin Brazier. In August 2021, Brazier & Muroki was replaced by To the Point, which Muroki co-hosted with Patrick Christys. On 27 October 2022, Muroki tweeted that she had left GB News.

== Personal life ==
In January 2025, Muroki revealed that she had been stalked by neo-Nazi Callum Purstow. Purstow was sentenced that month to over 22 years in jail for attempted murder of an asylum seeker, as well as a sex offence and two communications offences committed against Muroki in 2023.
