= Taking the knee =

Symbolic gesture protesting racism

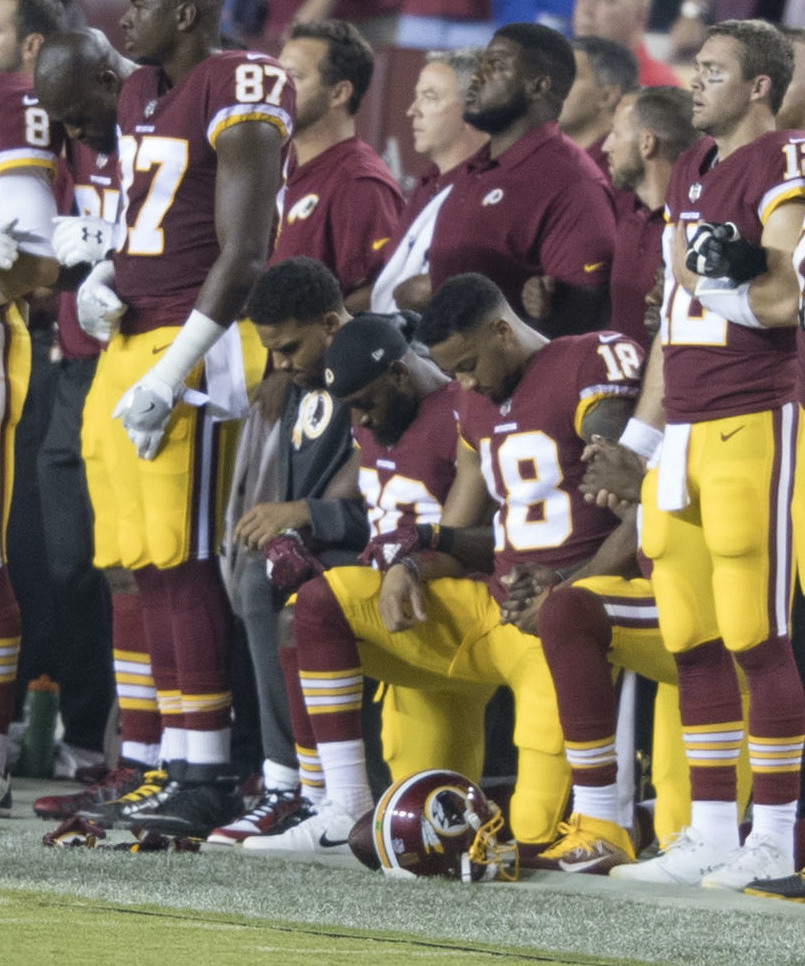
Washington Redskins players kneeling before a game against the Oakland Raiders in September 2017

Taking the knee (or taking a knee) is a symbolic gesture against racism whereby an individual kneels upon one knee in place of standing to attention for an anthem or other such occasion. It was originated by American football player Colin Kaepernick on September 1, 2016, in protest against the lack of attention given to the issues of racial inequality and police brutality in the United States. Kaepernick's protest led to a wider series of national anthem protests. It has since been adopted by sports players in countries around the world, including association football in the United Kingdom, in solidarity with Kaepernick's protest against racism, and has been seen worldwide in non-sporting contexts such as the Black Lives Matter protests.

== U.S. national anthem kneeling protests ==
The gesture originated in a 2016 American football game, during which Colin Kaepernick and his 49ers teammate Eric Reid chose to kneel during the playing of the US national anthem, to call attention to the issues of racial inequality and police brutality. Reid said of the decision:

After hours of careful consideration, and even a visit from Nate Boyer, a retired Green Beret and former NFL player, we came to the conclusion that we should kneel, rather than sit, the next day during the anthem as a peaceful protest. We chose to kneel because it’s a respectful gesture. I remember thinking our posture was like a flag flown at half-mast to mark a tragedy.

During the 2016 season, a small number of other players also took the knee before matches. Taking a knee became more frequent after then-President Trump criticized the gesture during a rally in September 2017, describing it as a disrespectful act against the United States national anthem and flag, and urging NFL team owners to sack "son of a bitch" players who performed it. In response, over a hundred NFL players took the knee in subsequent weeks, along with athletes from other sports, and spectators.

== Use in association football ==
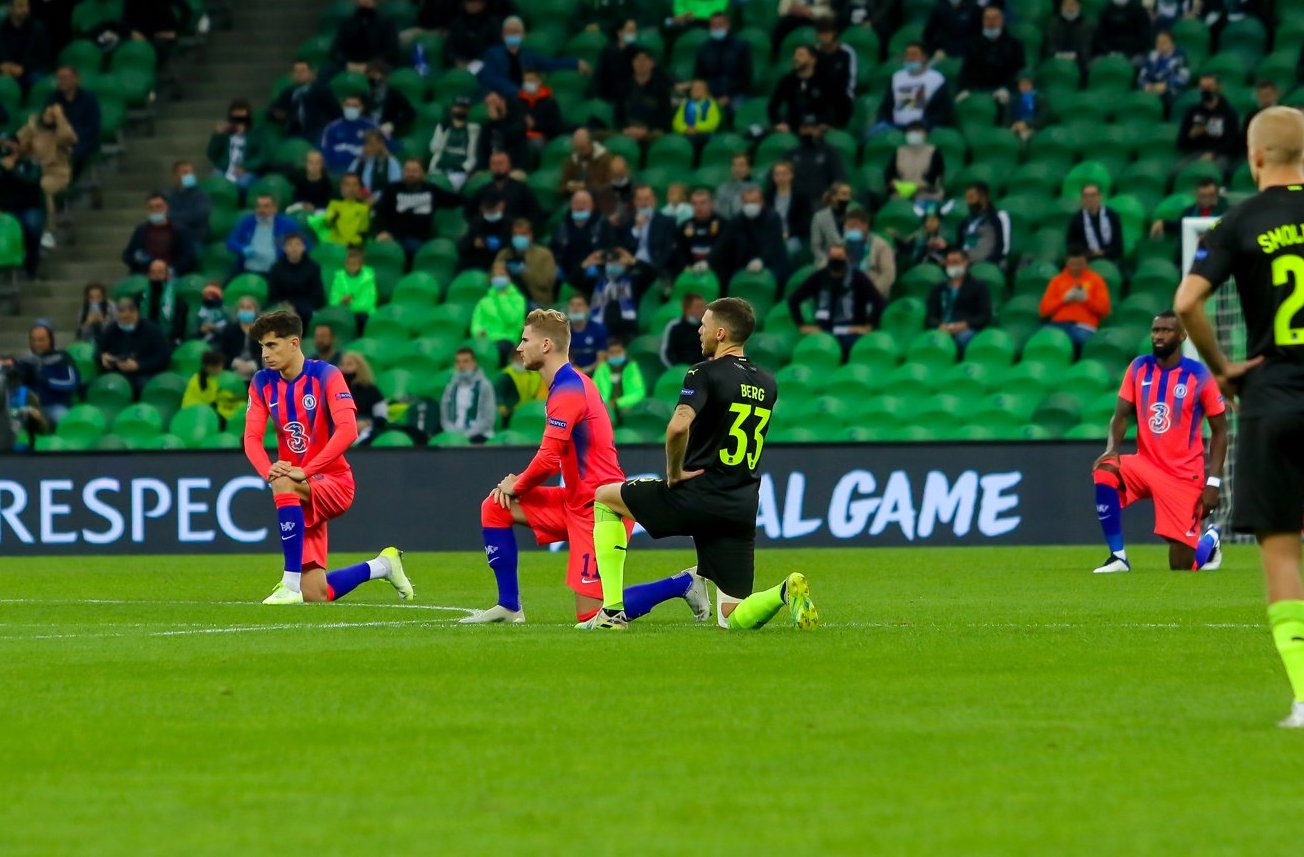
Players from FC Krasnodar and Chelsea F.C. kneeling at the start of a UEFA Champions League match in October 2020

Taking the knee was used by many clubs before kick-off throughout the 2020–21 English association football season, which was booed by some fans.

In a June 2020 radio interview, United Kingdom Foreign Secretary Dominic Raab said that he saw the gesture as "a symbol of subjugation and subordination, rather than one of liberation and emancipation", adding that he was unaware whether it had a broader history and that it seemed to him to be "taken from the Game of Thrones".

In September 2020, Middlesbrough said they would stop taking the knee. In December 2020 players from Millwall and QPR said they would not take the knee, but would instead stand arm-in-arm. By February 2021 other teams had stopped taking the knee, including Brentford, while individual players from other teams such as Wilfried Zaha said they would also stop. Zaha later became the first Premier League player to stop taking the knee. Derby County stopped in March 2021.

On June 8, 2021, prior to an international friendly game between Hungary and the Republic of Ireland, the Irish players were booed by some Hungarian fans prior to kick-off for taking the knee.

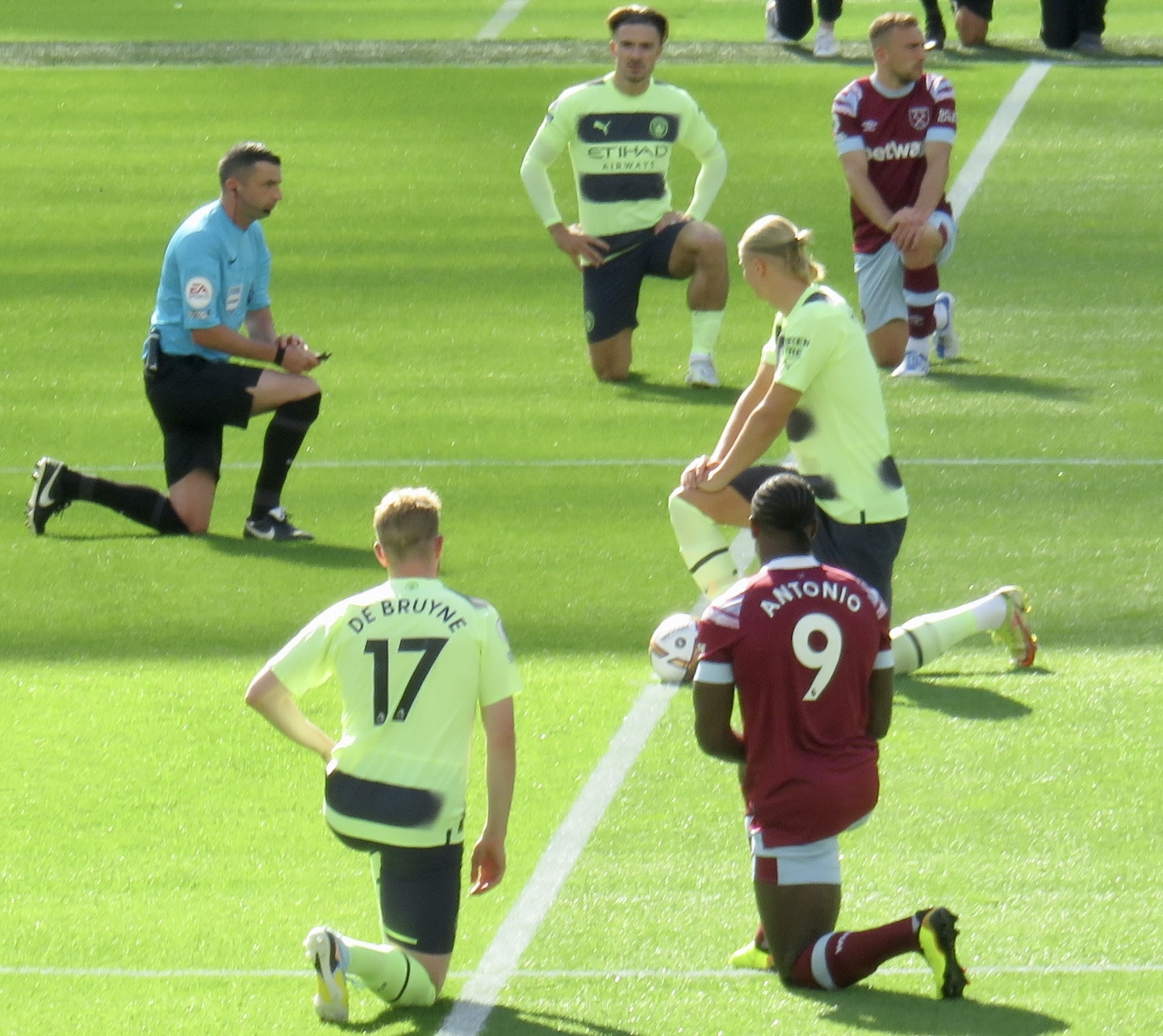
Referee and players of West Ham United F.C. and Manchester City F.C. take the knee on the opening weekend of the 2022–23 Premier League season.

The England national team took the knee before matches in 2021's UEFA European Football Championship, resulting in booing from some fans. Conservative MP Lee Anderson stated that he would not watch England games in the tournament as a direct result of this political gesture, saying he believed that "the vast majority of these fans booing last night are not racist" and thought they were "more likely to [...] not share the Marxist views of BLM". Kick It Out's chief executive Tony Burnett considered the booing an example of racism in the sport. The English Football Association later asked fans to respect the players' wishes to take the knee. England players were booed by Poland fans for kneeling against racism ahead of 2022 FIFA World Cup qualifying match at National Stadium, Warsaw.

In July 2021, Conservative MP Steve Baker said the Government should start backing players taking the knee, after Prime Minister Boris Johnson and Home Secretary Priti Patel had declined to condemn those who booed. Keir Starmer, Leader of the Opposition and leader of the Labour Party, said England's players were "right to take the knee".

Ahead of the 2022–23 Premier League season, Premier League club captains agreed to their teams no longer taking the knee routinely before matches, instead restricting the gesture to "significant moments" of the season. Some captains felt that the gesture had lost its power, and hoped that restricting it would increase its impact. Captains affirmed their commitment towards fighting racism and other forms of discrimination. During the 2022 FIFA World Cup game between England and Iran, England players took the knee prior to kick off while Iran's players stayed silent during their national anthem in acknowledgment of the protests in their country over the death of Mahsa Amini. Ahead of the 2023–24 Premier League the Premier League confirmed that players would continue to take the knee before "significant fixtures" which were given as the opening and final games of the season and dedicated No Room For Racism fixtures in October and April, and Boxing Day fixtures.

Similar to the Premier League, in some Women's Super League (WSL) matches, players take the knee before kick-off.

Speaking about the racist abuse of England women's national football team player Jess Carter in July 2025, midfielder Georgia Stanway said that the team would not be taking the knee in protest as it was felt that the gesture was no longer "doing what we want it to do".

== Similar gestures in history ==
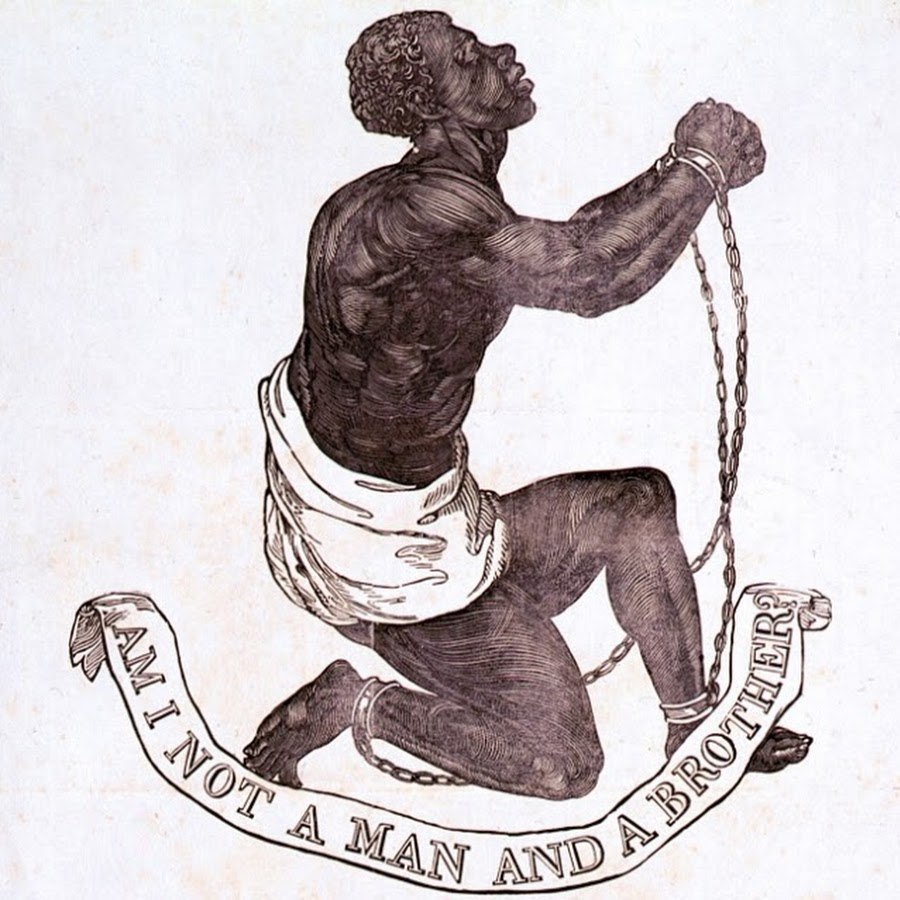
Am I Not a Man and a Brother? medallion created as part of anti-slavery campaign by Josiah Wedgwood, 1787

Writing in 2021, historian Farah Peterson saw the performance of the gesture in 2016 as a subversion and a reclamation of black confrontations with power, given that historically images of black people kneeling have been associated with oppression.

Josiah Wedgwood pottered the image of a black man kneeling in shackles and depicting slavery on the emblem of the British abolitionist movement during the 18th and 19th centuries—a movement to ban slavery and ill-treatment of people.

In 1965, Martin Luther King Jr. knelt in prayer with a group of equalities marchers during the Selma to Montgomery marches.

In 1962, American photographer Danny Lyon took a picture in Cairo, Illinois, showing three demonstrators on bended knee praying in front of the city's racially segregated swimming pool. Used in a poster of the Student Nonviolent Coordinating Committee (SNCC), it quickly became an iconic image of the US civil rights movement.
