= Stay Woke (disambiguation) =

Stay woke is a political phrase. It may also refer to:

- "Stay Woke" (Meek Mill song), a 2018 rap song featuring Miguel
- "Stay Woke" (Royce da 5'9" song), a 2018 rap song
- Stay Woke: The Black Lives Matter Movement, a 2016 American television documentary

== See also ==
- Woke (disambiguation)
