= Woke (disambiguation) =

Woke is an adjective meaning 'aware of issues concerning social and racial justice'.

Woke or WOKE may also refer to:

== Arts and entertainment ==
- Woke (TV series), a comedy TV series on Hulu
- Woke: A Guide to Social Justice, a book by Andrew Doyle under the pseudonym Titania McGrath
- Woke, Inc.: Inside Corporate America's Social Justice Scam, a book by Vivek Ramaswamy
- Woke, an album by The Beast

== Broadcasting ==
- WOKE-LP, a low-power radio station (94.9 FM) licensed to serve Fort Myers, Florida, United States; see List of radio stations in Florida
- WKSG (FM) (98.3 FM), licensed to serve Garrison, Kentucky, United States, which held the call sign WOKE from 1997 to 2018
- WQSC (1340 AM), licensed to serve Charleston, South Carolina, United States, which held the call sign WOKE from 1958 to 1994

== Other uses ==
- Emperor Kenzō of Japan, previously known as Prince Woke
