= Timeline of GB News =

This is a timeline of the history of GB News, a free-to-air television and radio news channel in the United Kingdom.

== Timeline ==
=== 2019 ===
- 25 September – All Perspectives Ltd is founded as the holding company of GB News.

=== 2020 ===
- January – All Perspectives Ltd is granted a licence to broadcast by the media regulator Ofcom.
- 25 September – It is announced that Andrew Neil, who has presented live political programmes on the BBC for 25 years, will leave the corporation after leading its coverage of the 2020 United States presidential election. On the same day, he is announced as the presenter of a prime time evening programme on GB News, due to launch early the next year.
- October – Sir Robbie Gibb stands down as an editorial adviser.
- December – Sir Paul Marshall, a hedge-fund manager, is in talks to invest £10 million into GB News.

=== 2021 ===
==== January 2021 ====
- 6 January – GB News reaches its £60 million fundraising aim, which it says is oversubscribed. The majority of the £60 million came from the American multinational Discovery, Inc., the United Arab Emirates-based investment firm Legatum, and Marshall, who says he is investing in a personal capacity. GB News says it will recruit 140 staff, including 120 journalists, and will also launch "streaming, video-on-demand and audio services".
- 25 January – The recruitment drive begins.
- 28 January – It is announced that Dan Wootton will leave News UK to join the channel as the host of a daily show, five days a week.

==== February 2021 ====
- 8 February – The pressure group Stop Funding Hate calls for advertisers to boycott the channel, based on what it thinks it will represent.
- 10 February – Sky News' Colin Brazier is reported to be the host of a news, interview and debate daytime programme.
- 18 February – It is announced that Darren McCaffrey will join the channel as political editor and Tom Harwood as a political correspondent.
- 19 February – Michelle Dewberry is named as the host of a five-day-a-week prime time show.

==== March 2021 ====
- 2 March – Inaya Folarin Iman, a 24-year-old journalist and former Brexit Party candidate, is announced as another five-day-a-week host.
- 5 March – Former Brexit Party Member of the European Parliament Alex Phillips is hired.
- 10 March – Following Piers Morgan's departure from Good Morning Britain on 9 March, Neil expresses interest in Morgan joining GB News instead.
- 13 March – It is announced that Liam Halligan will join the channel as economics and business editor.
- 14 March – In an episode of BBC Radio 4's The Media Show, Neil states that his nightly news programme will contain segments such as "Wokewatch" and "Mediawatch".
- 18 March – The channel announces that comedian Andrew Doyle will join it to host a weekly current affairs show.
- 23 March – It is announced that Euronews' Rosie Wright will join the channel's breakfast presenting team.
- 25 March – It is said that BBC News newsreader Simon McCoy will present an afternoon show.
- 29 March – It is announced that broadcaster Kirsty Gallacher will join the breakfast team.

==== April 2021 ====
- 2 April – Former ITV News presenter Alastair Stewart is announced as the host of a weekend news and current affairs programme.
- 16 April – Archaeologist Neil Oliver is hired to host a weekly current affairs and interview programme.
- 19 April – Former Labour Party Member of Parliament Gloria De Piero is hired to host an afternoon programme.
- 23 April – It is announced that Mercy Muroki will co-host a daytime programme tackling everyday issues.

==== June 2021 ====
- 8 June – Neil says that talks with Piers Morgan were affected by a disagreement: "he's [Morgan] got his own idea of what he is worth and we [GB News] have a slightly different idea of what he's worth".
- 11 June – Isabel Webster joins the channel as the co-host of a weekly news review programme.
- 13 June –
  - GB News commences broadcasting at 20:00 BST. 336,000 viewers tune in to see the launch. The launch soon becomes the subject of ridicule due to the perceived poor production quality of the channel and frequent technical issues.
  - Ofcom receives complaints relating to a monologue made on the opening night's edition of Tonight Live with Dan Wootton in which he argues against the government's extension of the COVID-19-related lockdowns in the UK.
- 16 June –
  - Comments made by guest Lady Colin Campbell seemingly in defence of the deceased child molester Jeffrey Epstein, and his relationship with Prince Andrew – such as saying that criticism of Andrew is "a distraction" to keep Bill Clinton "out of the frame" – draw derision.
  - By this day, several brands including Vodafone, IKEA, Kopparbergs Brewery, Grolsch, Nivea, Pinterest, Specsavers and Octopus Energy have paused their advertising on the channel, expressing concerns over its content. Some of these advertisements had been placed on the brands' behalf without their knowledge, by Sky Media through their advertising opt-outs during GB News' schedule.
- 19 June – The culture secretary, Oliver Dowden, criticises Stop Funding Hate and what he describes as "a vocal Twitter minority" for calling for the advertising boycott.
- 20 June – Nigel Farage and Dehenna Davison join GB News as contributors to host the Sunday morning political discussion programme The Political Correction.
- 24 June – Neil takes a break from presenting on the channel, less than two weeks after its launch.

==== July 2021 ====
- 5 July – Ofcom decides not to pursue any of the complaints relating to Dan Wootton's monologue on 13 June, a spokesperson saying, "Our rules allow for rigorous debate around the response to coronavirus... consistent with the right to free expression".
- 13 July – Senior executive producer Gill Penlington, formerly of CNN, ITV and Sky News, leaves the channel.
- 14 July – Audience figures drop so low they are reported as zero by the ratings measurement board the Broadcasters' Audience Research Board at least twice on the day, attributed to regular viewers boycotting the station after one of its presenters, Guto Harri, took the knee on-air in solidarity with the England football team.
- 16 July –
  - GB News suspends Guto Harri for taking the knee.
  - It is reported by The Guardian that John McAndrew, director of news and programmes, formerly of Sky News and Euronews, had stood down from his role.
- 17 July – It is announced that Nigel Farage, already a contributing presenter, will host Farage, a prime-time evening show, from 19 July.
- 18 July – Guto Harri confirms he has permanently left the channel.
- 19 July –
  - It is announced that Mark Dolan will join the channel with Tonight Live with Mark Dolan on 23 July and that Nana Akua will move to a new self-titled programme on Saturday and Sunday afternoons while continuing to host The Great British Breakfast.
  - The first episode of Nigel Farage's show airs.

==== August 2021 ====
- 5 August – It is announced that Talkradio's Patrick Christys will join the channel to present To the Point on weekday mornings alongside Mercy Muroki. The programme will replace Brazier & Muroki. This leaves Colin Brazier's sole presenting role as filling in for Neil in the 8 pm slot.
- 7 August – After Simon McCoy moves permanently to the breakfast show, McCoy & Phillips is replaced by Alex Phillips' own show, The Afternoon Agenda.
- 10 August – The channel announces four political programmes to launch within weeks: The Briefing: AM with Tom Harwood, The Briefing: Lunchtime with Gloria De Piero, The Briefing: PM with Darren McCaffrey, and The Briefing: PMQs.

==== September 2021 ====
- 3 September – The channel announces that political journalist Isabel Oakeshott will host a weekly show.
- 13 September – Neil resigns from GB News as chairman and lead presenter and announces he will enter a new role as a guest contributor.
- 14 September – Neil is replaced as a presenter by Colin Brazier in what The Telegraph describes as a "fight back by swinging to the right". Brazier is given a permanent programme at 8 pm called Brazier.
- 17 September – On the BBC's Question Time, Neil says that he had become a "minority of one" on the channel's board, due to disputes over its approach to journalism.
- 22 September – Neil says he will not return to GB News.

==== October 2021 ====
- Following the launch announcement of rival TalkTV, GB News introduces half-hourly news bulletins and it is reported that Sunday Express editor Mick Booker will join as editorial director.

==== November 2021 ====
- 17 November – Neil calls his decision to lead the channel the "single biggest mistake" of his career, adding "The mistake was that I put my face on the tin and yet I quickly discovered that I really had no say over what was going into that tin".
- 26 November – Kirsty Gallacher steps back from her role on The Great British Breakfast because of an ear tumour.

==== December 2021 ====
- 10 December –
  - It is announced that Eamonn Holmes and Isabel Webster will present a Monday to Thursday breakfast show, Breakfast with Eamonn and Isabel.
  - It is announced that Simon McCoy will leave the channel in January "for personal reasons".
- 21 December – It is announced that Stephen Dixon and Anne Diamond will present the breakfast show Friday to Sunday.

=== 2022 ===
==== January 2022 ====
- Colin Brazier's 8 pm weeknight show is moved to 4 to 6 pm, and the 8 pm Monday to Friday slot is filled by a new show, Steyn, hosted by Mark Steyn.
- We Need to Talk About... hosted by Alex Phillips begins at 2 pm on weekdays targeting women.
- Alastair Stewart's weekend programme begins also airing on Friday afternoons.
- Mick Booker joins as editorial director.
- 4 January – GB News Radio, an audio simulcast of the station, becomes available on DAB+ radio. Eamonn Holmes and Isabel Webster are the first to be heard on the simulcast when their television breakfast show starts.
- 17 January – GB News announces it will play "God Save the Queen" at the start of live programming every day.
- 18 January – The channel begins playing the National Anthem.

==== March 2022 ====
- 2 March – Company accounts are published for the period ending 31 May 2021 for All Perspectives Ltd, that made a loss of £2.7 million.
- 31 March – The first episode of a weekly comedy panel show called The Ministry of Offence is recorded in London.

==== April 2022 ====
- 16 April – The comedy panel show Ministry of Offence makes its debut on GB News.
- 25 April – TalkTV, GB News' main news rival, launches. Audience figures for TalkTV's opening night show its ratings outperforming GB News for the debut edition of its flagship show, Piers Morgan Uncensored (aired at 8 pm), but higher figures for GB News for the night as a whole.

==== May 2022 ====
- 18 May – Figures published by RAJAR indicate GB News Radio received an average audience of 239,000 listeners during its first three months on air.

==== June 2022 ====
- 14 June – GB News confirms it will air coverage of the Twelfth of July parade from Belfast after the BBC decided not to broadcast the event. Former Northern Ireland First Minister Dame Arlene Foster will present coverage of the parade.

==== July 2022 ====
- 12 July – GB News airs coverage of the Twelfth of July parade in Northern Ireland. The event, presented by Dame Arlene Foster, the channel's Northern Ireland correspondent Dougie Beattie and former Coronation Street actor Charles Lawson, draws a peak audience of 98,000 viewers.
- 28 July – Ofcom is to launch an investigation into GB News after presenter Mark Steyn made misleading claims about COVID-19 booster vaccines on the 21 April edition of his show. Steyn had alleged that British people were being killed by having the booster and that there was a media silence on the issue.
- 31 July – The Telegraph reports that TalkTV and GB News are in a bidding war to secure Channel 604 on Virgin Media. The news channels currently occupy channels 626 and 627, but a move would increase their profile by putting them next to larger rivals such as BBC News and Sky News.

==== August 2022 ====
- 4 August – The latest RAJAR figures are published, covering radio listening in the United Kingdom during the second quarter of 2022. They show a percentage increase in listeners for both Talkradio and GB News, with the audience increase at 6% and 16% respectively when compared with the previous quarter.
- 8 August –
  - The Telegraph reports that GB News have beaten TalkTV to secure a channel move on Virgin Media to Channel 604, giving it a higher news channel ranking, and placing it between Sky News and BBC Parliament.
  - An Ofcom investigation clears Nigel Farage's "Talking Pints" segment of breaching standards following an interview on 23 August 2021 that featured darts player Bobby George using what was described as "offensive language". The decision means GB News remains clear of any reprimands from Ofcom since its launch.
- 10 August – GB News airs The People's Forum with Liz Truss from Leigh, Greater Manchester, with Conservative leadership candidate Liz Truss answering questions from an audience.
- 11 August – Rachel Sweeney announces she is leaving her role as GB News' North East correspondent.
- 18 August –
  - It is reported that GB News has secured £60 million of new investment, having approached investor Sir Paul Marshall for further funding. American multinational Warner Bros. Discovery announces its intention to sell its stake in GB News. GB News announces that co-founders Andrew Cole and Mark Schneider have resigned as directors and sold their stakes in the business.
  - It is reported that The Telegraph journalist Camilla Tominey will become a political presenter on the channel and that the Daily Mail's Andrew Pierce will launch his own show later in the year. It is also reported that Michael Portillo will be supporting GB News' political coverage and presenting a new programme in the autumn.
- 19 August – GB News airs a two-hour Conservative leadership hustings from Manchester featuring the two candidates, Liz Truss and Rishi Sunak, and hosted by GB News presenter Alastair Stewart.
- 28 August – GB News attracts criticism from Jewish community groups after Peter Imanuelsen, a journalist and alleged Holocaust denier, appeared on the previous evening's edition of Neil Oliver's programme to talk about population decline in the UK. Imanuelsen rejects claims of denying the Holocaust, blaming "fake, photoshopped screenshots" created by those attempting to "smear" him.
- 31 August − GB News performs a shakeup of its daytime schedule which will take effect from the first week in September, giving Gloria de Piero and Philip Davies and Esther McVey new shows, while Alexandra Phillips and Colin Brazier are axed from the channel.

==== September 2022 ====
- 7 September – GB News appoints Nicole O'Shea as commercial director, responsible for advertising on the channel.
- 8 September – GB News suspends advertising following news of the death of Queen Elizabeth II.
- 19 September – The channel covers Queen Elizabeth II's state funeral, and is one of a number of British television channels to take pooled footage of the funeral proceedings from the BBC.
- 21 September – Helen Warner, chief creative officer at broadcast production company Whisper and former head of daytime at ITV and Channel 4, is appointed GB News head of television as the channel seeks to expand its programme content.

==== October 2022 ====
- 2 October –
  - The Sunday Times reports that the value of GB News has more than halved since Discovery sold its stake in the news channel.
  - Michael Portillo's new show, called Portillo, launches, covering politics and the arts.
- 6 October – It is reported that GB News has appointed Reach plc executive Geoff Marsh as its chief digital officer.
- 10 October – Actor John Cleese confirms he will present a programme for GB News from 2023, where he will work alongside Andrew Doyle.
- 14 October – Ofcom announces an investigation into GB News over its coverage of matters relating to COVID-19 vaccination following an interview with the author Naomi Wolf that aired on 4 October, and during which she claimed women were being harmed by COVID-19 vaccines as part of an effort "to destroy British civil society", while likening the behaviour of the medical profession to that of Nazi Germany. Ofcom's investigation will cover whether the interview broke "rules designed to protect viewers from harmful material", and is the second such investigation into the news channel.

==== November 2022 ====
- 7 November – Ofcom finds GB News Radio in breach of the broadcasting code Rule 6.0 for not providing notification of all parties and candidates standing in the 2022 Birmingham Erdington by-election during an on air discussion on 2 March. While the channel did show onscreen details of the candidates during the To the Point debate on 2 March, the same information was not provided for its radio simulcast.

==== December 2022 ====
- 21 December – News company The News Movement confirms that Becca Hutson, GB News' former head of digital who left the channel in October, is joining to become its UK head of news.

=== 2023 ===
==== January 2023 ====
- 9 January – It is reported that GB News has hired comedian Daniel O'Reilly as a commentator on its late night newspaper review show, Headliners.
- 13 January – It is reported that former GB News presenter Mercy Muroki has been hired by the UK government to advise Kemi Badenoch, the Minister for Women and Equalities, on gender policy.
- 17 January – GB News head of television Helen Warner leaves her post after four months with the channel.
- 26 January – GB News announces it has hired Conservative MP and former Business Secretary Jacob Rees-Mogg to present a show.

==== February 2023 ====
- 6 February – Mark Steyn, who used his GB News show to cast doubt on the safety of COVID-19 vaccines, quits the channel after claiming its bosses tried to make him pay fines issued by Ofcom following two investigations into his programme.
- 8 February – The Board of Deputies of British Jews and the All-Party Parliamentary Group Against Antisemitism urge the media regulator Ofcom and GB News to tackle what it describes as the channel's indulgence in conspiracy theories. The comments follow the 4 February edition of Neil Oliver's programme in which he described a "silent war" by generations of politicians to take "total control of the people" by creating a "one-world government".
- 14 February – It is reported that former Loose Women presenter Saira Khan will join Eamonn Holmes on GB News on the Monday and Tuesday editions of The Great British Breakfast.
- 21 February – The Telegraph journalist Christopher Hope announces he is joining GB News as head of politics and political editor later in the year.
- 28 February – Intelligence tool Foresight News appoints GB News deputy news editor Jamie Micklethwaite as its deputy editor.

==== March 2023 ====
- March – GB News moves from its gbnews.uk URL to gbnews.com at the start of March to help build its presence outside the UK. The new website also includes new features such as dedicated pages for each show and a full catch-up service.
- 5 March – It is announced that Dame Arlene Foster will expand her role at GB News, taking on further presenting duties alongside making documentaries for the channel. Her first documentary, looking at the role of faith in politics, is to come out later in the year.
- 6 March –
  - GB News confirms it will air coverage of the Twelfth of July parade from Belfast for the second year running. Foster will again present coverage of the parade.
  - Ofcom says that GB News broke broadcasting rules in April 2022 when Mark Steyn made "potentially harmful and materially misleading" claims about COVID-19 vaccines.
- 7 March – GB News announces that Conservative MP Lee Anderson is to host a show on the channel.
- 9 March – GB News reports a loss of £30 million for its first year on air, from June 2021 to June 2022. It also had a turnover of £3.6 million over the same period.
- 11 March – GB News airs The Alternative Match of the Day, hosted by Mark Dolan and Patrick Christys, following the BBC's announcement that Gary Lineker would be taking a "step back" from presenting Match of the Day after Lineker's criticism of the UK's asylum policy via Twitter. The programme does not show any actual football coverage, and is panned on social media by viewers who believed it to be a parody.
- 19 March – GB News airs the final edition of Alastair Stewart & Friends. Alastair Stewart announces his retirement a few days later.
- 23 March –
  - GB News announces plans to expand its political coverage and establish a new studio in Westminster.
  - It is reported that Lee Anderson will be paid £100,000 a year for his new presenting role with the channel.

==== April 2023 ====
- 3 April – Ofcom launches an investigation into GB News over potential impartiality following a programme in which Chancellor Jeremy Hunt was interviewed by presenters and Conservative MPs Esther McVey and Philip Davies. Ofcom will look at whether the programme, aired on 11 March, broke its rules "requiring news and current affairs to be presented with due impartiality".
- 8/9 April – GB News airs The GB News Easter Special, a programme in which Calvin Robinson, an Anglican transitional deacon, discusses faith and contemporary issues with four Christian academics. The programme also includes singing and readings from religious text.

==== May 2023 ====
- 2 May – While broadcasting live from Buckingham Palace on GB News, Jacob Rees-Mogg is told to evacuate by police as a controlled explosion is carried out following the arrest of a man for throwing shotgun cartridges into the palace grounds.
- 3 May – Former US President Donald Trump is a guest on Nigel Farage's GB News show.
- 9 May – Ofcom finds GB News in breach of broadcasting regulations over its October 2021 edition of Mark Steyn's programme in which it was claimed the COVID-19 vaccination programme in the United Kingdom amounted to "mass murder". The regulator finds that GB News did not do enough to protect its viewers from harmful content, and rules that GB News must now attend a meeting with Ofcom.

==== June 2023 ====
- 21 June – Ofcom have received 61 complaints about the 18 June edition of GB News's Headliners in which comedian Lewis Schaffer made a string of claims about COVID-19, including that it was not a real virus.
- 23 June – Debut of Lee Anderson's new show, Lee Anderson's Real World, on GB News. The first edition sees him joined by fellow MP Brendan Clarke-Smith, who he spoon feeds baked beans as part of a taste test.
- 29 June – Conservative MP Lee Anderson faces censure from the Serjeant at Arms of the House of Commons for filming a promotional video for his GB News programme on Parliamentary property without permission.

==== July 2023 ====
- 3 July – Ofcom launches investigations into an episode of Jacob Rees-Mogg's State of the Nation that aired on GB News on 9 May, and an edition of Richard Tice presented by Alex Salmond on TalkTV on 2 April, both of which covered news stories, but were presented by politicians. The State of the Nation investigation will establish whether the edition of the programme, which covered a jury verdict on former US President Donald Trump, complies with broadcast regulations, while the Richard Tice investigation will look at whether the programme was presented with due impartiality. The former received 40 complaints after airing, while the latter received two.
- 7 July – Ofcom launches an investigation into a GB News campaign that urges the UK government to introduce legislation to stop "Britain becoming a cashless society" following a complaint. The "Don't Kill Cash" petition, which has been signed by more than 166,000 people, potentially breaches Ofcom's rules that require broadcasters to not comment on "matters of political and industrial controversy or current public policy".
- 10 July – The Parliamentary Commissioner for Standards opens an investigation into Conservative MP Lee Anderson for using the roof of his Westminster office to film a promotional video for his GB News show.
- 18 July – GB News presenter Dan Wootton says that he has made "errors of judgement in the past" but denied any criminality following allegations he offered to pay colleagues several thousand pounds for explicit pictures of themselves.
- 28 July – BBC News Online reports that a clip of GB News presenter Neil Oliver accusing the BBC "and others" of "driving fear" over climate change by using "supposedly terrifying temperatures", has been viewed more than two million times on social media since Oliver made the comments four days earlier during a discussion about the 2023 Rhodes wildfires.

==== August 2023 ====
- 3 August –
  - Figures published by RAJAR for the second quarter of 2023 indicate a 14% year-on-year increase of listeners to GB News Radio, with 317,000 in the second quarter of 2023 compared to 277,000 during the second quarter of 2022.
  - Following a protest by Greenpeace activists, who climbed on to the roof of Rishi Sunak's house, GB News stages a stunt in retaliation for the demonstration. Reporter Ben Leo is sent to Greenpeace's London offices without invitation. During the visit he speaks to Greenpeace officials, wonders around the premises, and makes himself a cup of tea.
- 7 August – Ofcom launches four separate investigations into impartiality at GB News, three of them relating to programmes presented by Jacob Rees-Mogg, Phillip Davies and Esther McVey, and the fourth concerning an edition of Laurence Fox's show presented by Martin Daubney. The investigations concern politicians presenting news coverage.
- 10 August – Byline Times reports several allegations of "racism, sexism and misogyny" involving staff and senior figures at GB News.
- 22 August – GB News have appointed Chris Rogers as editor of their breakfast programme and say they have "ambitious" plans for the show.

==== September 2023 ====
- 6 September – The Glasgow Herald reports that controversial GB News presenter Neil Oliver has resigned from the Royal Society of Edinburgh.
- 9 September – A clip of GB News presenter Martin Daubney presenting a breaking news article about the arrest of prison escapee Daniel Khalife goes viral after Daubney becomes flustered while trying to report the story.
- 18 September – An Ofcom investigation into a GB News programme during which Esther McVey and Phillip Davies interviewed Chancellor Jeremy Hunt before the 2023 budget finds the programme failed to include an "appropriately wide range of significant views".
- 21 September – GB News says it is continuing to "monitor" allegations against Dan Wootton, but that they have not been "proved by an independent body".
- 27 September – GB News suspends Laurence Fox and Dan Wootton after comments made on the previous evening's edition of Tonight with Dan Wootton during which Fox asked "what self-respecting man" would "climb into bed" with journalist Ava Evans. GB News says it will formally apologise to Evans for the remarks.
- 28 September – Ofcom launches an investigation into the 26 September edition of the GB News programme Dan Wootton Tonight after receiving 7,300 complaints about comments made by Laurence Fox, while MailOnline terminates its contract with Wootton, who wrote a twice weekly column for the newspaper.
- 29 September –
  - GB News boss Angelos Frangopoulos tells the BBC Laurence Fox's comments about Ava Evans were "way past the limits of acceptance" and that GB News is conducting its own investigation into what happened, which he expects "to be resolved very quickly".
  - Laurence Fox apologises for his comments about Ava Evans, describing them as "demeaning" and "not representative of who I am".
  - Calvin Robinson, who presents a religious affairs programme for GB News, becomes the third presenter to be suspended by the news channel after voicing his support for Dan Wootton in an online post. Robinson said he would not appear on Dan Wootton Tonight without Wootton, claiming "if he falls, we all fall".
  - Ahead of the broadcast of an interview with Conservative Home Secretary Suella Braverman conducted by Conservative deputy chair and GB News presenter Lee Anderson, the chief executive of Ofcom, Melanie Dawes, says there are no present rules to prevent GB News using Anderson to interview Braverman.
- 30 September – Media outlets, including The Observer, report that British banker George Farmer, the former boss of Parler and husband of US pro-Trump Conservative commentator Candace Owens, has joined the board of GB News.

==== October 2023 ====
- 2 October – Allegations surface that GB News is employing at least five people who have faced allegations of sexual impropriety, including one accused of rape.
- 4 October –
  - Laurence Fox and Calvin Robinson are sacked from GB News following the controversy over comments made by Fox about journalist Ava Evans.
  - The number of Ofcom complaints received about the edition of Dan Wootton Tonight in which Fox made his comments about Ava Evans has passed 8,000.
- 17 October – GB News is removed from the internal television system of the Senedd following comments made by Laurence Fox, which a spokesman for the Presiding Officer describes as "deliberately offensive".
- 23 October – Ofcom finds GB News breached its regulations on impartiality during a programme which aired on 16 June. Former Brexit Party MEP Martin Daubney was standing in for Laurence Fox when he interviewed Reform Party leader Richard Tice and discussed immigration. Ofcom finds Tice was not "sufficiently challenged" on his views and "the limited alternative views presented were dismissed". However, Ofcom decides that Lee Anderson's interview with Home Secretary Suella Braverman did not breach their impartiality rules as it was a current affairs programme.
- 25 October – Welsh Conservative leader Andrew RT Davies appears on Nigel Farage's GB News programme, later facing criticism from a senior Welsh Government minister for "appalling misogyny" for suggesting that Senedd Convenor Elin Jones was too "busy doing her hair" to appear on the programme.
- 26 October – RAJAR audience figures for the third quarter of 2023 show GB News Radio with an average weekly audience of 398,000 listeners.
- 27 October – GB News have hired former Prime Minister Boris Johnson to present a series "showcasing the power of Britain around the world"; he will also help to provide coverage of the next UK and US elections.
- 29 October – The first episode of The Dinosaur Hour hosted by comedian John Cleese is broadcast.

==== November 2023 ====
- 3 November – Patrick Christys raises over £234,000 in a fundraiser launched on his show on 30 October for the Royal British Legion.
- 12 November – Ofcom chair Michael Grade tells Sunday with Laura Kuenssberg that Ofcom does not "want to be in the business of telling broadcasters, licensees, who they can employ, who they can't employ". The comment comes in response to questions as to whether GB News should be allowed to employ politicians as presenters on its channel.
- 15 November – Senedd Presiding Officer Elin Jones announces an independent review of television channels that will be available in the Senedd building following her previous ban of GB News.
- November – In response to an advertiser boycott, GB News introduces an online paywall with three membership tiers. This it part of a strategy to obtain fresh income streams following substantial financial losses in its first year.

==== December 2023 ====
- 6 December – Television and radio presenter Carol Vorderman discloses that she rejected an offer from GB News after leaving BBC Radio Wales over the BBC's new social media guidelines.
- 11 December – Sky News reports that GB News has asked its investors for a further £30m in capital.
- 18 December – Ofcom rules that GB News broke impartiality rules with an edition of The Live Desk that promoted its "Don't Kill Cash" campaign.
- 20 December – Ofcom reveals that the edition of Dan Wootton Tonight featuring Laurence Fox's comments about journalist Ava Evans was the most complained about TV show of 2023, with 8,867 viewer complaints received by the watchdog.

=== 2024 ===
==== January 2024 ====
- 8 January – Ofcom delays the publication of research into politicians presenting news programmes until it has ruled on investigations open into GB News.
- 11 January – The Liberal Democrats ask Ofcom to investigate GB News over alleged bias in its coverage of the Post Office scandal, including what the party's deputy leader, Daisy Cooper, describes as "a fictitious monologue" Nigel Farage delivered about the Liberal Democrat leader, Sir Ed Davey, which she says contained "a number of factual inaccuracies".
- 17 January – An error with the calculation of viewing figures that had given GB News a million viewers for its New Year's Eve coverage is corrected by BARB, and shows the channel actually had 33,000 viewers that evening.

==== February 2024 ====
- 1 February – RAJAR figures for the final quarter of 2023 indicate GB News Radio had an average weekly audience of 430,000.
- 12 February – Prime Minister Rishi Sunak appears on an hour long GB News People's Forum, where a selected audience of undecided voters are invited to ask him questions. The programme is presented by Stephen Dixon.
- 19 February – Ofcom launches an impartiality investigation into GB News's Q&A session with prime minister Rishi Sunak.
- 20 February – GB News announces it has ended its radio advertising and sponsorship contract with Bauer Media, and that it is launching its own advertising sales operation.
- 21 February – The Metropolitan Police says it will take no further action over allegations that Dan Wootton offered to pay colleagues for sexually explicit pictures of themselves.
- 24 February – Lee Anderson is suspended from the Conservative Party after "refusing to apologise" for claiming "Islamists" had "got control" of London Mayor Sadiq Khan during an edition of his GB News show the previous day.

==== March 2024 ====
- 4 March – Following its investigation into the episode of GB News's Dan Wootton Tonight during which Laurence Fox made comments about journalist Ava Evans, Ofcom concludes that the programme was in breach of its regulations. The watchdog says the comments "constituted a highly personal attack on Ms Evans and were potentially highly offensive to viewers", and says that it has "significant concerns about GB News' editorial control of its live output" and is requiring it "provide further detailed information about its compliance practices in this area".
- 5 March – Dan Wootton announces his departure from GB News following the previous day's Ofcom ruling.
- 18 March – Ofcom finds that five episodes of GB News shows, presented by Jacob Rees Mogg, Esther McVey and Phillip Davies, broke their rules, and warns the channel about its use of Conservative MPs to host news content.

==== April 2024 ====
- 4 April – GB News hires Steven Edgington as its North America correspondent, making him the channel's first international correspondent.
- 11 April – Sky News reports that hedge fund manager Sir Paul Marshall is to relinquish his seat on the board of All Perspectives Ltd, the company that owns GB News, as the television channel faces a major restructuring process.
- 19 April – GB News chief executive Angelos Frangopoulos announces 40 redundancies at the channel after it previously posted heavy financial losses.

==== May 2024 ====
- 20 May – Ofcom says it is considering imposing a statutory sanction against GB News after concluding its programme People's Forum: The Prime Minister, a Q&A session with prime minister Rishi Sunak that aired in February, broke impartiality rules.
- 23 May – GB News announces plans to launch legal action against Ofcom after the regulator ruled the channel had broken broadcasting rules.

==== July 2024 ====
- 2 July – Eamonn Holmes is forced to leave his GB News breakfast show half way through the programme due to ill health.
- 11 July – A week after his election to Parliament, GB News announces that Nigel Farage is returning to his show on the channel, presenting on Tuesdays, Wednesdays and Thursdays from 16 July.
- 16 July – The Radio Today website reports that sports bulletins on GB News Radio are now being powered by Artificial Intelligence and voiced by a virtual newsreader.

==== August 2024 ====
- 29 August – Newsreader Ray Addison announces his departure from GB News after reading his final news bulletin for the channel.

==== September 2024 ====
- 9 September – Ofcom discontinues five impartiality investigations into GB News's "Don't Kill Cash" campaign as the channel had already been reprimanded over the campaign.
- 10 September – Hedge fund manager and GB News investor Paul Marshall, agrees a deal to purchase The Spectator for £100m.

==== October 2024 ====
- 4 October – GB News loses a High Court challenge against Ofcom in which it hoped to temporarily block the regulator from sanctioning it over its People's Forum programme featuring Rishi Sunak in February, while Sunak was prime minister. GB News is given permission to challenge the ruling, with Ofcom agreeing to hold off publication of its findings until the case is heard.
- 17 October – 2024 Conservative Party leadership election: Conservative Party leadership candidates Robert Jenrick and Kemi Badenoch take part in a leadership debate on GB News, but Badenoch has turned down an invitation to take part in a Question Time special on BBC One, and a planned online debate organised by The Sun.
- 29 October – Former GB News presenter Mark Steyn is ordered to pay £50,000 in legal costs after losing a case against Ofcom in which he alleged the regulator had "killed" his career with two rulings about COVID-19 content in his shows during 2022.
- 31 October – GB News is fined £100,000 by Ofcom for breaking impartiality rules with a programme featuring the former Prime Minister Rishi Sunak.

==== November 2024 ====
- 10 November – GB News goes off-air during the Remembrance Sunday two-minute silence at 11am, with viewers seeing a test card accompanied by a sustained loud bleeping.

==== December 2024 ====
- 4 December – Research from Barb Audiences indicates viewing figures for GB News surpassed those for Sky News for the first time during November, with an average audience of 70,430 for GB News over a 20 hour period from 6am to 2am, compared to 67,670 for Sky News.
- 9 December – A report by the Centre for Media Monitoring indicates that GB News accounted for half of all news stories about Muslims over a two year period, much of them negative, something the report describes as a "excessive" focus bordering on "obsession".
- 19 December – GB News unveils a new schedule for 2025. Highlights include the departures of Mark Dolan, Isabel Webster and Andrew Doyle, while Ben Leo will present Ben Leo Tonight on Saturdays and Sundays, and Miriam Cates will present Dewbs & Co every other Friday. Ellie Costello will co-present breakfast alongside Eamonn Holmes on Mondays to Wednesdays and Stephen Dixon on Thursdays and Fridays.
- 29 December – Conservative Party allies of Kemi Badenoch reject claims she asked GB News to reduce Nigel Farage's airtime on the channel.

=== 2025 ===
==== February 2025 ====
- 12 February – Ofcom says it is "carefully assessing" 1,227 complaints relating to comments made by Josh Howie on an edition of GB News's Headliners on 22 January concerning the LGBT community.
- 28 February – The High Court rules that Ofcom acted unlawfully with rulings over two shows hosted by Jacob Rees-Mogg on GB News in 2023, which it said breached the broadcasting code on impartiality grounds. It is the first time Ofcom has lost such a case.

==== March 2025 ====
- 14 March – Ofcom removes three breach of broadcasting code conditions against GB News following the High Court ruling in the channel's favour at the end of February.
- 17 March – Ofcom drops its remaining impartiality investigations against GB News following the High Court's ruling in the channel's favour.

==== June 2025 ====
- 9 June – GB News launches new late night programming, with Patrick Christys Tonight: Late Edition on Mondays to Thursdays and Ben Leo Tonight: Late Edition from Fridays to Sundays.
- 30 June – GB News announces the launch of a nightly show from Washington D.C. from September, providing coverage of US news stories and presented by Bev Turner.

==== August 2025 ====
- 1 August – Figures released by official ratings agency Barb showed that GB News overtook both the BBC News channel and Sky News for the month of July for the first time, with an average audience of 80,600 across each day.
- 30 August – Olivia Utley joins Charlie Peters to co-present Saturday Morning Live on GB News.

==== September 2025 ====
- 17 September – GB News reaches one million followers on Instagram.

=== 2026 ===
==== January 2026 ====
- 27 January – Author and GB News presenter Matt Goodwin is announced as the Reform UK candidate in the 2026 Gorton and Denton by-election.

==== June 2026 ====
- 19 June – Launch of GB Mums, a weekly show targeting mothers.

==== September 2026 ====
- 30 September – GB News appoints Tom Harwood as its US Political Editor.

==== November 2026 ====
- November – GB Media launches GB Music Radio, a radio station playing tracks made up entirely of British artists and groups.
