= Titania McGrath =

Parody Twitter user by Andrew Doyle

- First appearance: Twitter; 2018
- Created by: Andrew Doyle
- Portrayed by: Alice Marshall

In-universe information
- Species: Human
- Gender: Female
- Occupation: Poet

Titania McGrath (@TitaniaMcGrath) is a parody Twitter account created and run by Andrew Doyle, an Irish comedian and Spiked columnist. Doyle describes her as "a militant vegan who thinks she is a better poet than William Shakespeare". As of March 2021, the character has more than 600,000 followers. Using this pseudonym, Doyle wrote a book, Woke: A Guide to Social Justice, which was published on 7 March 2019. His second book under the name, My First Little Book of Intersectional Activism, was published in September 2020. He also created a live comedy show featuring Titania (played by Alice Marshall), which debuted at the Edinburgh Festival Fringe in August 2019.

== Character ==
The fictional Titania Gethsemane McGrath is a 24-year-old "radical intersectionalist poet committed to feminism, social justice and armed peaceful protest" who identifies as non-binary, "polyracial" and ecosexual. In an interview with The Spectator, the persona revealed that she was raised by parents who "lavished" her with "gifts and money" to distract her from her "oppression". She became woke through the Bible passage of the Cleansing of the Temple, which inspired her to "a similar thing" at the age of four at her local branch of HSBC. She studied Modern Languages at Oxford University before completing an MA in gender studies, for which she wrote "a groundbreaking dissertation on technopaganism and the corrosive nature of cis-masculine futurity". On her Twitter account, McGrath promotes extreme identity politics and political correctness, and comments on various topics, notably Brexit, LGBT issues, feminism and American politics.

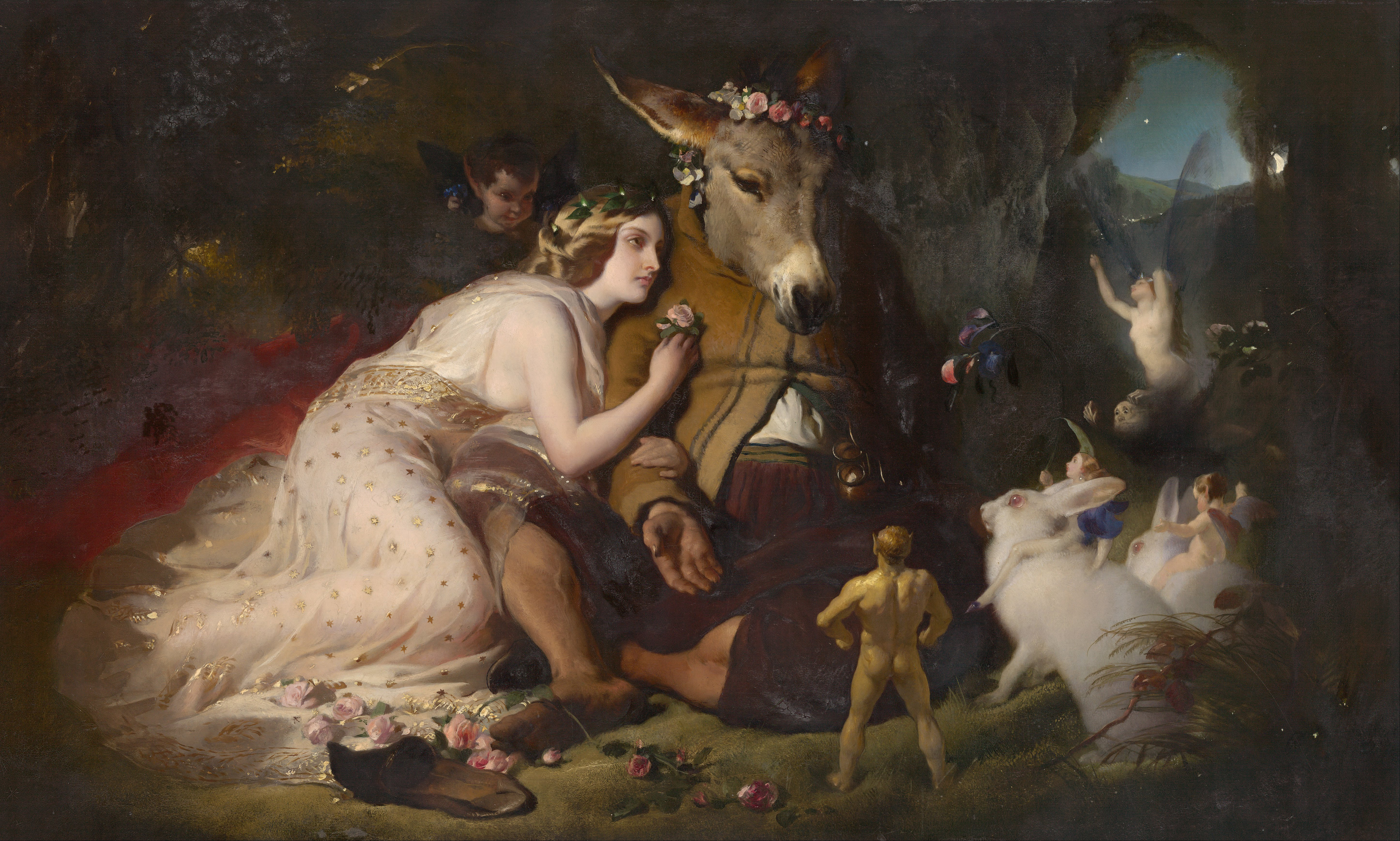
Titania McGrath is named after Titania (pictured), the queen of fairies from William Shakespeare's A Midsummer Night's Dream.

Andrew Doyle, the creator of McGrath, revealed to The Daily Telegraph that she is named after Titania, the queen of the fairies from Shakespeare's A Midsummer Night's Dream, as he believes that "all of this 'woke culture' is an utter fantasy world". He added: "The people who promote this hyper inclusive culture are fantasists [...] so I think it's quite appropriate that she is named after the queen of the fairies."

Commentators at The Conversation and the Irish Independent have compared Doyle's work to the work of several satirists from the 18th century, such as Jonathan Swift's Isaac Bickerstaff, suggesting that McGrath, much like Bickerstaff, was created to criticise those with views the creator disagrees with in a manner which they feel he would be reluctant to state without anonymity.

== History ==
The account's creator, Andrew Doyle, is a comedian, and a columnist for British internet magazine Spiked. He is also the former co-writer of fictitious news reporter Jonathan Pie. Doyle has stated that he wished to mock contemporary "woke culture", as "the majority of people are desperate for this culture to be mocked"; he subsequently created an anonymous Twitter account for his fictional character, Titania McGrath, in April 2018.

McGrath's Twitter account has been suspended for alleged hate speech four times, notably on 9 December 2018, only for it to gain 20,000 followers after it was reinstated a day later. As of December 2024, the spoof account had more than 740,000 followers.

On 7 March 2019, McGrath published her first book, titled Woke: A Guide to Social Justice. A tweet she had posted promoting the book appeared in Private Eye's "Pseuds corner". The post read: "I have written the most important book of 2019. Do not buy it for my sake, but for the sake of humanity." Within a few days of its publication, Woke was among the 100 bestselling books on Amazon, and the number of followers on McGrath's Twitter account rose from 150,000 to 228,000.

In March 2019, Doyle was contacted by Rosamund Urwin, a journalist at The Sunday Times, who asked whether he was the person behind McGrath's Twitter account, due to the inclusion of several sources in McGrath's book that he had quoted previously. Though he denied it, he later revealed himself as the man behind the account. Beforehand, Andrew Doyle had claimed that there was speculation that several people, including Chris Morris, Ricky Gervais, Ann Coulter, or even Urwin herself, were behind the account.

McGrath's first children's book, My First Little Book of Intersectional Activism, was published by Little, Brown in September 2020.

== Reception ==
Janice Turner of The Times praised the author in her review of Woke for "perfectly captur[ing] the chiding, self-righteous, intolerant, joyless tone of the 'woke'", and added that though "the politics can be heavy-handed, ... its satire is a direct hit on the awful state of the left, in all its nihilism, narcissism and illogic, and its self-defeating, petty-minded thought policing. Woke is no joke." Patricia Casey of the Irish Independent hailed McGrath's tweets as "outrageous and hilarious", leaving her "addicted, hooked, devoted". The New Criterion praised Doyle's satirical humour, writing that "blessed with a pitch perfect ear for absurdity, [he] has revealed the malign hilarity of woke culture". Emily Sheffield, writing for the Evening Standard, called McGrath's book "hilarious", though "in book form ... the parody becomes repetitive". However, she added that "Virtuousness, virtual or otherwise, is an easy target. Being woke even simpler to satirise."

Charles Moore of The Spectator called the character "genius" and praised her tweets. Shappi Khorsandi, in an article for The Independent, compared McGrath favourably to Millie Tant from the comic magazine Viz and stated that McGrath "pricks pomposity and tempers moral certitude with a hint of doubt; in short, she keeps us honest". Neil Mackay of The Herald wrote that Titania's book "mercilessly satires the Left's online umbrage brigade, the permanently offended, those who have taken on the role of policing thoughts and words to the point of absurdity", adding that Titania's targets "need [to be] mocked" as they "make good causes look ridiculous, they alienate when they should be persuading, and they turn liberalism – which I hold dear – into something stupid".

Conversely, Alex Clark of The Observer criticised the character, stating that "lampooning the language of social justice is a cheap shot" and that "it doesn't get us much further than the temporary glow of self-praise, and it certainly doesn't get us off the bus to hell". Mollie Goodfellow of the New Statesman echoed these views, arguing that McGrath "simply isn't that funny", and suggested that her target audience are "the people who claim 'you can't say anything anymore', even as their opinions are repeated constantly on national TV, in the papers and online", and "who question whether feminism has 'gone too far' and say 'people will be offended by anything these days', just after saying something offensive".

A live show called "Mxnifesto" was performed at the 2019 Edinburgh Festival Fringe, where it received mixed reviews.

== See also ==
- Jonathan Pie, a fictitious news reporter formerly co-written by Doyle
