= Mathias Corvinus Collegium =

College for advanced studies in Budapest, Hungary

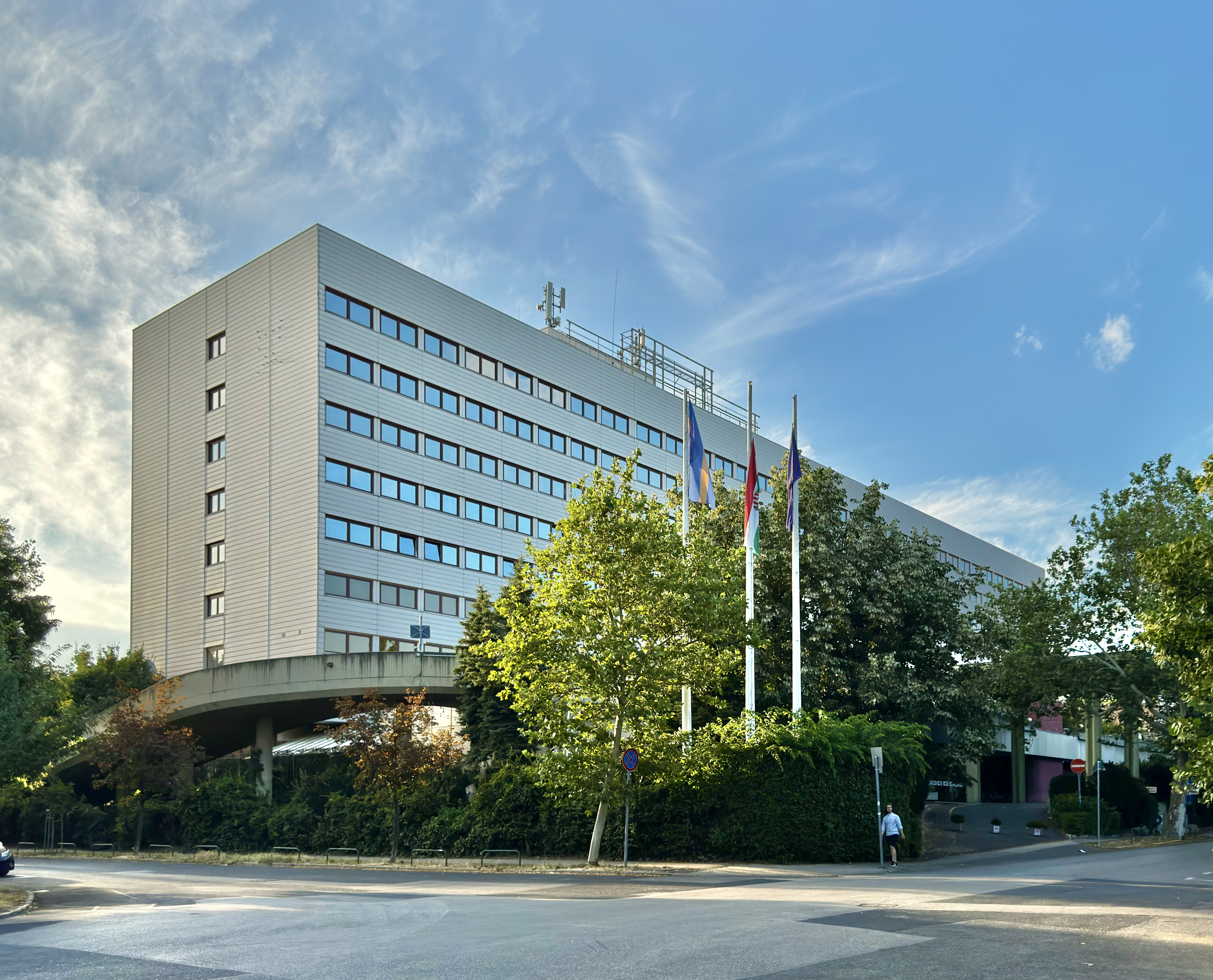
- image of Mathias Corvinus Collegium
- Type: Private college for advanced studies
- Established: 1996
- Endowment: €1.1 billion (451 billion Ft, 2023)
- Budget: €88.2 million (36 billion Ft, 2023)
- Chairman: Madarász László (last chairman)
- Director: Zoltán Szalai
- Students: 7000 (2023)
- Location: Tas vezér utca 3–7., Budapest, 1113, Hungary; 47.478085°N 19.039671°E
- Colours: gold and blue
- Website: mcc.hu

Mathias Corvinus Collegium (MCC) is Hungary's largest educational institution located in Budapest, Hungary.

Founded in 1996, it was initially directed at university students in the arts and social sciences. It serves as a student dormitory, scholarship program and a private educational institution aiming to provide academic education beyond the traditional framework to students of all ages from Hungary and abroad. By February 2023, MCC had 7000 students. In addition to its training programs, MCC operates various mobility and scholarship programs, publishes books and scientific articles, organizes international and domestic conferences and forums to promote democratic dialogues and discussions. Programs are generally free of charge.

In 2020, the MCC received an influx of Hungarian government funds and assets valued at US$1.7 billion. Due to its close ties to Viktor Orbán's government, its critics describe MCC as a "breeding ground for future Fidesz-friendly elites". The chairman of MCC's board of trustees, Balázs Orbán, helped plan the transfer in his concurrent role as state secretary in the office of Viktor Orbán's government.

== History ==
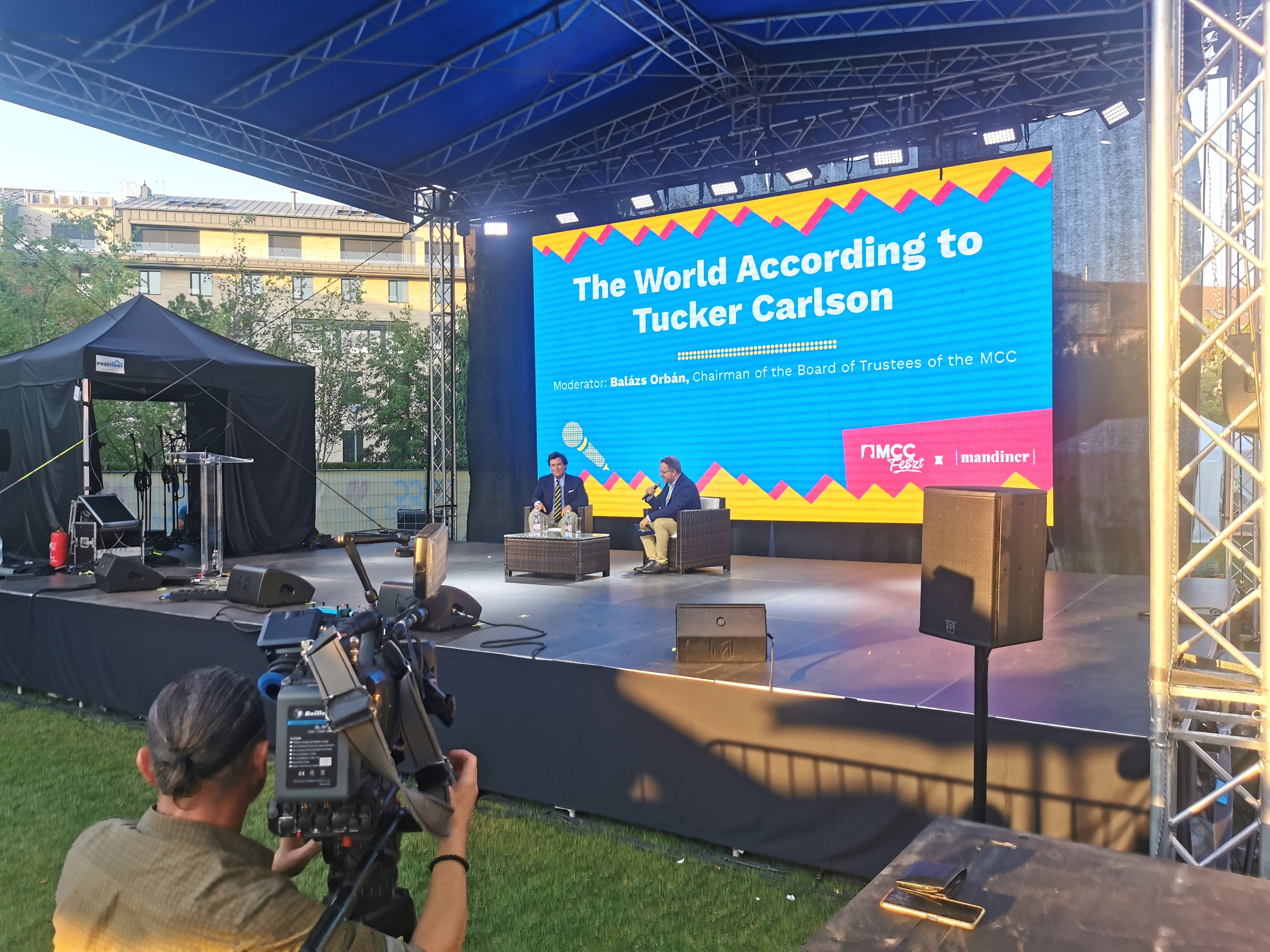
An MCC event with journalist Tucker Carlson, August 2021

In 1996, the founding Tombor family donated a significant amount of money to create an institution for talent development. The aim of their initiative was to support highly talented young people committed to the prosperity of our country and provide them with complementary training which is not possible within the traditional school system due to a lack of time and resources. Initially, the institution only welcomed high school and university students.

In the 2000s, Miklós Maróth was also among the directors of MCC. In 2001, a residence hall was established on Somlói Road in Budapest with 47 students. After a year the institute launched a program for high school students, followed by the start of a two-year-long specialization offered to university students in law, economics, social sciences, international relations, and communication. In 2009, the Leadership Academy was established.

In the 2010s, as MCC expanded, new local high school and university programs were launched in Transylvania, Romania, in Cluj-Napoca, and Odorheiu Secuiesc. In the middle of the decade, courses for elementary school students were started as well as public leadership training programs in Transylvania and Transcarpathia. In these years, new education programs for young women leaders and the Roma youth were also launched while psychology was added to the curriculum for university students. In 2015, MCC opened its doors to elementary school students and launched its Primary School Program.

In 2020, the Mathias Corvinus Collegium Foundation took the place of the dissolved Tihany Foundation in maintaining the Collegium. The Hungarian Parliament transferred 10-10% of the shares of MOL Plc. and Gedeon Richter Plc. and the real estate on Somlói Road to the Foundation. In the same year, the Foundation received new funding from the central budget.

In 2021, American Tucker Carlson spoke at a conference sponsored by the Collegium.

== Structure ==
MCC's core education activity is relying on its Schools for advanced studies and research institutes. In the end of 2022, MCC had 6100 students. By February 2023, 7000 students were enrolled. In May 2025, MCC claimed that it had more than 7,800 students enrolled.

Training courses are provided through the following programs: Primary School Program, High School Program, University Program, Postgraduate Programs, MCC Ph.D. Program, Postdoctoral Program, Leadership Academy, and the Roma Talent Program.

As of February 2023, the University Program is built on the academic work of its Schools:

- School of Law
- School of Economics
- MCC-Mindset School of Psychology
- Media School
- School of International Relations
- School of Social Sciences and History
- Postgraduate Programs

MCC's single-issue think tanks:

- Migration Research Institute
- Climate Policy Institute
- German-Hungarian Institute for European Cooperation
- Youth Research Institute
- Learning Institute
- Flow Research Institute

== Programs ==
=== Scholarships ===
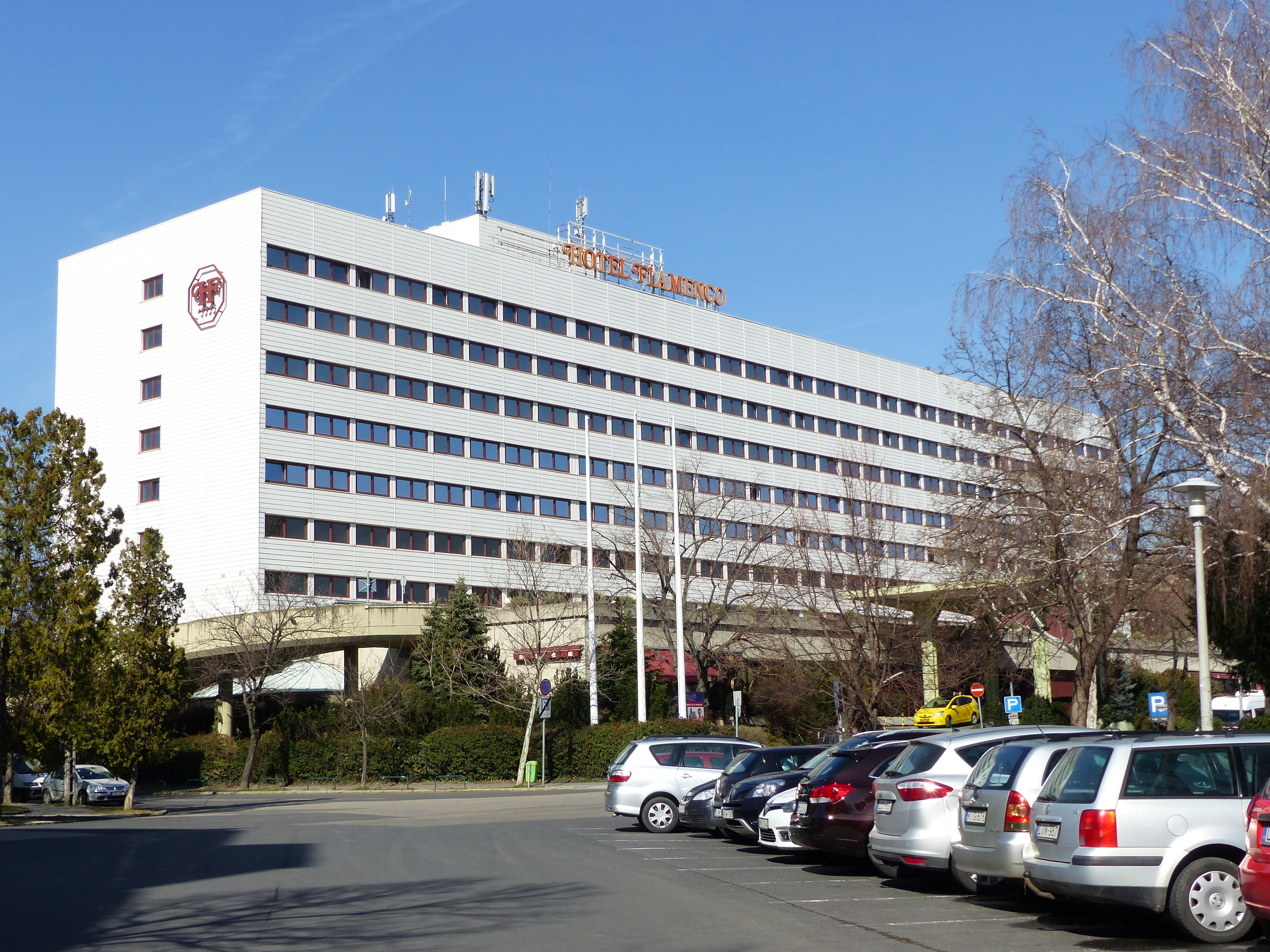
MCC HQ at Tass street

MCC provides various types of scholarships to help its students and professionals to be able to deepen their knowledge and to be able to conduct research at the best universities of the world. As of June 2023, MCC offers the following scholarships:

- MCC Fellowship Program
- MCC Training Grant
- MCC Mobility+
- Budapest Fellowship Program
- Visiting Fellowship Program
- ESMT Berlin

In 2020, the MCC launched the MCC Visiting Fellowship visiting researcher scholarship program, within the framework of which outstanding foreign (and Hungarian living abroad) researchers and professors were given the opportunity to participate in MCC's complex activities, research and teach at MCC's Budapest and regional centers for a period of 2 weeks to 6 months.

In 2021, MCC and the Hungary Initiatives Foundation, based in Washington, D.C., jointly established the Budapest Fellowship Program, a 10-month exchange for young US-based scholars to work and research in Budapest.

=== High school and elementary school programs ===
Since 2002, the MCC has been running the High School Program which provides free training, including distance learning and Saturday sessions, for the most talented high school students across the Carpathian Basin. This program supplements the regular high school curriculum and assists students in choosing a career path, preparing for further studies, and offering initial support for long-term career planning.

The MCC has been providing an extracurricular talent program for high school students since 2015. This program, called the Youth Talent Program, aims to increase students' enthusiasm for learning, prepare them for higher education, guide them in their career choices, and help them succeed in life.

In 2021, the MCC said it plans to expand its programs to 10,000 high school and elementary school students in 35 European cities with Hungarian populations.

MCC launched its lectures series called Parents’ Academy, which targets parents with relevant topics to help them navigate through parenthood. The lectures cover various topics such as education, cyber security and the role of parents.

== Locations ==
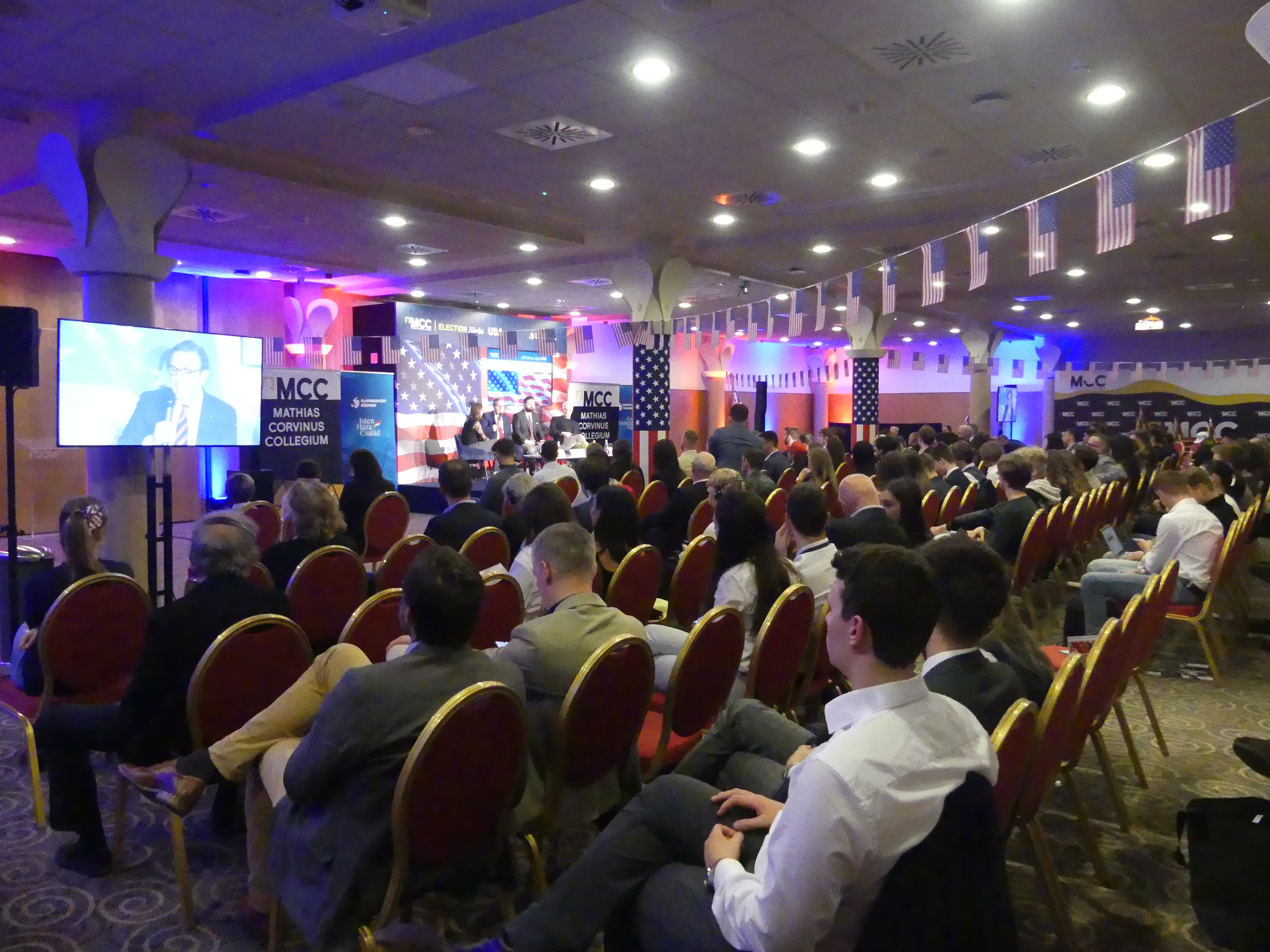
MCC Tas on Election Night 2024 – Peter Boghossian, Gladden Pappin, Miklós Szánthó

The initial location, the former Workers' Militia headquarters on Budapest's Gellért Hill, was gradually expanded to include Balassi Institute's premises. On 6 January 2021, MCC announced a public procurement tender for a new build at the Gellért Hill site, replacing the current buildings.

In 2025, Mathias Corvinus Collegium had 18 locations in Hungary: Budapest, Győr, Szombathely, Zalaegerszeg, Veszprém, Székesfehérvár, Szekszárd, Pécs, Kecskemét, Szeged, Békéscsaba, Szolnok, Miskolc, Nyíregyháza, Debrecen, Eger, Kaposvár, and Révfülöp. In the Carpathian Basin MCC has 10 centers, 9 of which are located in Romania: Arad, Oradea, Satu Mare, Cluj-Napoca, Târgu Mureș, Miercurea Ciuc and in Sfântu Gheorghe, Iacobeni, and Odorheiu Secuiesc, while in Ukraine MCC has a center in Berehove. Altogether MCC is present in 24 locations in the Carpathian Basin. MCC also has locations in Brussels, Dunajská Streda (Slovakia), and Subotica (Serbia).

As part of MCC's building projects in the countryside, MCC has undertaken the renovation of several poorly maintained but historic buildings worthy of retention. These include the Grand Hotel Aranybika in Debrecen, the Hotel Konferencia in Győr, the Avas Hotel in Miskolc, the Officers' Casino in Pécs, the children and youth camp in Révfülöp, the Bartók Béla Cultural Center in Szeged, the former Sports Hall in Szekszárd, the former dormitory on Petőfi Street in Szombathely, and the old town hall in Zalaegerszeg. They aim to establish talent development activities in these emblematic buildings as soon as possible to revitalize these sites that once were centers of the local community life.

MCC opened a center in Brussels in November 2022, dedicated to facilitating policy deliberation and in-depth exploration of contemporary issues. The center offers a platform for intellectuals and experts to debate and assess the conceptual and normative status of European policy making. It seeks to acquaint and influence European policymakers with its distinctive approach to political, socio-economic, and cultural issues. Additionally, the center provides a challenging and stimulating environment for visiting students to gain insight into the policy and decision-making process in Brussels through short educational courses and seminars on topics related to European thought and EU policy making.

== Conferences and events ==
Students of Mathias Corvinus Collegium can learn from internationally recognized teachers and researchers who regularly visit MCC. Numerous domestic and international professional events including large-scale international conferences were organized.

=== Budapest Lectures ===
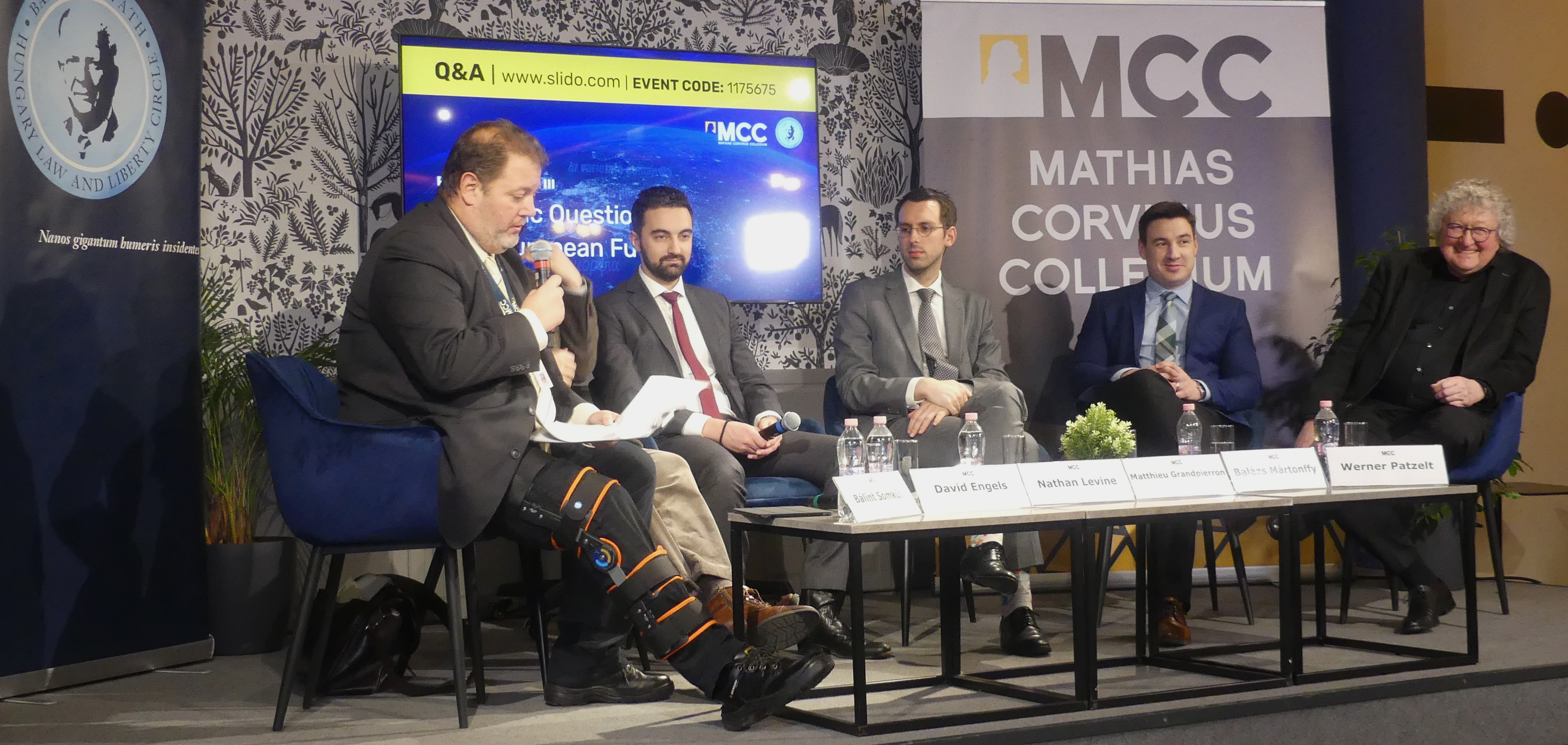
At MCC Scruton: Panel Strategic Questions for a European Future

The Budapest Lectures series offers a platform for intellectuals to delve into contemporary topics spanning international politics, economy, culture, and other pertinent issues that are currently preoccupying the minds of thought leaders. The primary objective of these discussions is to analyze these often controversial yet captivating topics. During these events, MCC aims to present the public with the most versatile, high-level, and thought-provoking lectures. The series features internationally acclaimed experts who are exceptional in their respective fields and are frequently involved in shaping public, social, and business relations across the globe. Guest lecturers were Mark Khater from University of Cambridge, Jeffrey Sachs, Joshua Katz and Tilo Schabert professor emeritus of political science at University of Erlangen, author of Boston Politics.

=== Budapest Summit ===
The summit every year focuses on key issues, which are important to understand to have a better understanding of the world. In 2019 the main focus was on migration, while in 2020 Patriotism was the key question of the event. In 2022 MCC organized two Budapest Summits, in February the event was focusing on the education in shaping young people's self-awareness, thinking, and identity, while in September the main question was the economic consequences of the war.

=== Ambassador Talk ===
The Ambassador Talk series features active ambassadors who present their country or country of residence, diplomatic experiences, and relations with Hungary. The events also feature a Q&A session where students and academics can ask questions. The program's objective is to provide students with an understanding of Hungary's day-to-day relationships with other nations, familiarize them with partner countries' characteristics, and introduce them to the daily work, challenges, and experiences of ambassadors and heads of mission.

=== Lunch Talks ===
The bi-weekly Lunch Talks feature a presentation by a member of the academic staff or a visiting fellow from abroad on their latest research findings. Following the presentation, an expert from a different discipline or one of the students serves as an opponent and asks questions during the ensuing discussion. The program's primary objective is to establish a forum for MCC students and academic staff to share their research outcomes and engage in informal discussions.

== Governance ==
The MCC is governed by a foundation. Members are appointed for life, and only the current members can choose new members. The leader of its main board is Balázs Orbán, who was also state secretary in the office of Viktor Orbán between 2018 and 2022.

== Publishing ==
MCC started its publishing activities in 2008. The independent MCC Publishing House was launched in 2011 and since then it has published several volumes. The published books focus on the debates already conducted in the Anglo-Saxon world and on the lives and works of individuals whom the institution considers exemplary. Furthermore, it is an important publishing opportunity for the students, faculty, and former students of MCC.

== Political affiliation ==
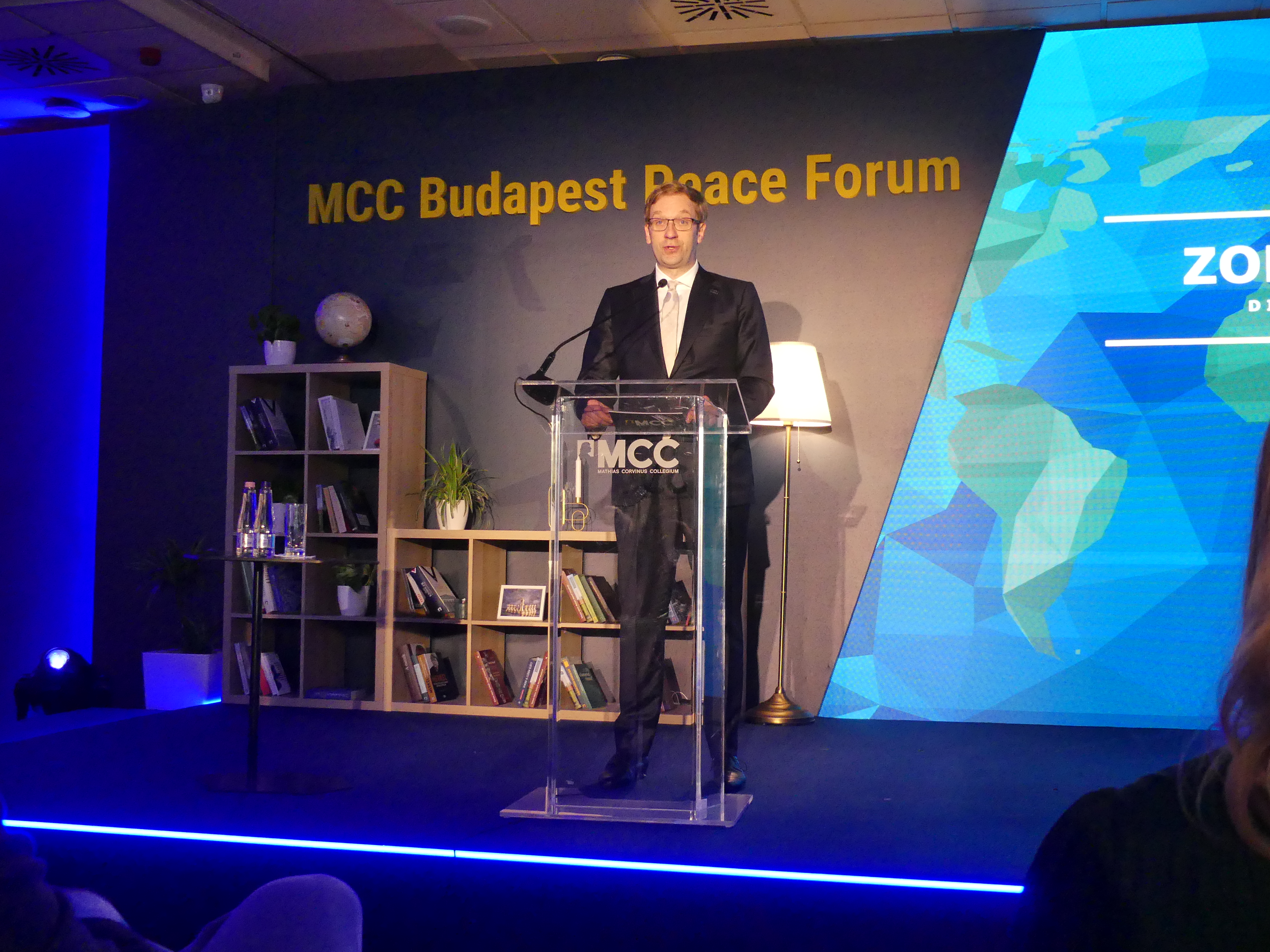
Zoltán Szalai addressing MCC Budapest Peace Forum 2023

Some commentators regard the MCC as being closely linked to the Orbán government. Director General Zoltán Szalai said in a 2020 interview that MCC is ideologically independent, but not value-neutral, with MCC encouraging its students to become part of Hungary's cultural, economic, and social elite.

In 2020, the National Assembly apportioned a 10% shareholding in each of MOL and Gedeon Richter to the MCC's endowment, valued at US$1.3 billion, plus $462 million in cash and $9 million of property. This was seen as controversial as many of the MCC's leading personalities are associated with Fidesz and the inner circle around PM Viktor Orbán.

== See also ==
- Deep state
- Matthias Corvinus
