= Woke =

Political slang

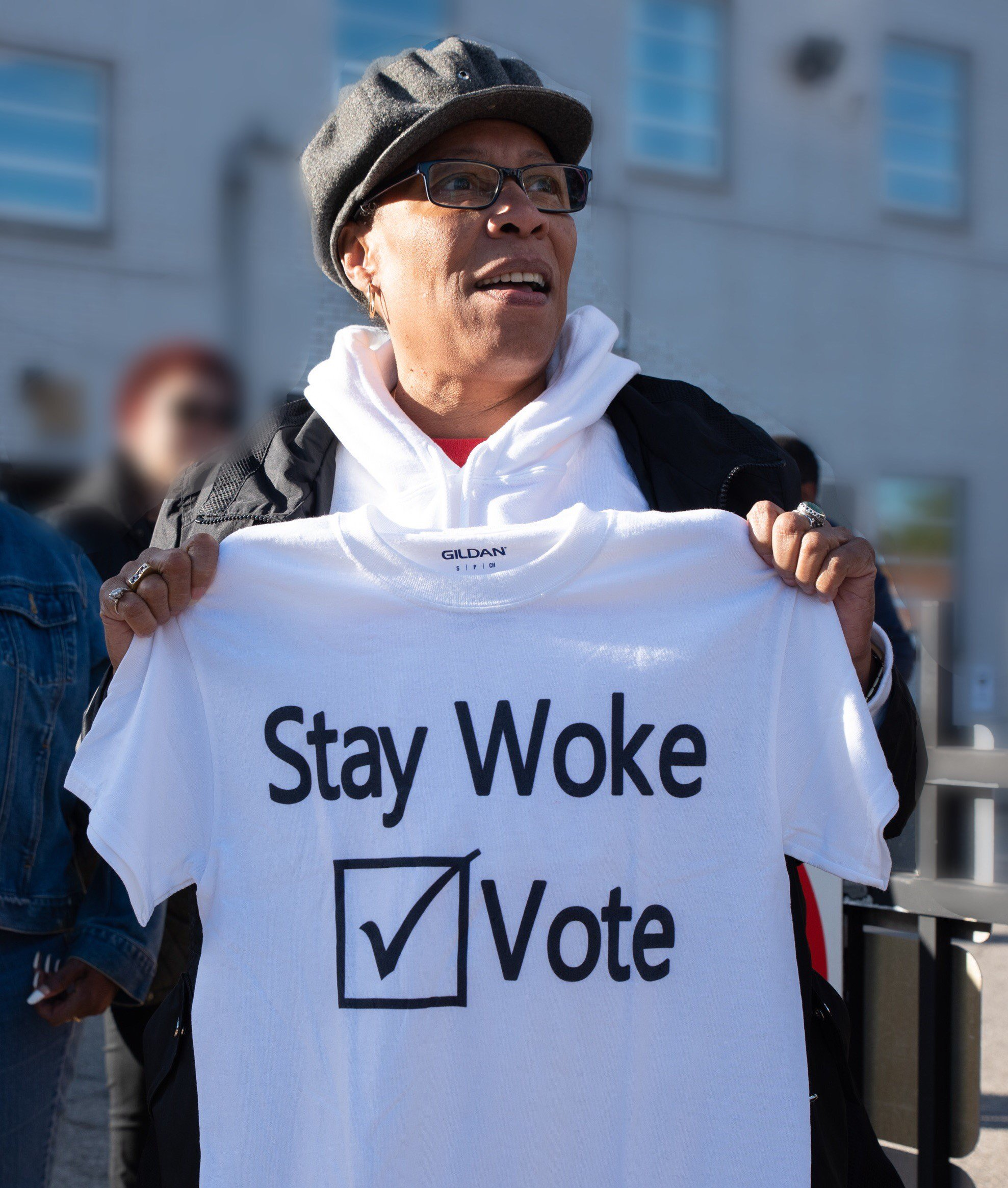
U.S. Congresswoman Marcia Fudge in 2018

Woke is an adjective derived from African-American English used since the 1930s or earlier to refer to awareness of racial prejudice and discrimination, often in the construction stay woke, recorded since at least 1924. The term acquired political connotations by the 1970s and gained further popularity in the 2010s with the hashtag #staywoke. Over time, woke came to be used to refer to a broader awareness of social inequalities such as sexism and denial of LGBTQ rights. Woke has also been used as shorthand for some ideas of the American Left involving identity politics and social justice, such as white privilege and reparations for slavery in the United States.

During the 2014 Ferguson protests, Black Lives Matter (BLM) activists seeking to raise awareness about police shootings of African Americans popularized the phrase stay woke. After being used on Black Twitter, the term woke was increasingly adopted by white people to signal their support for progressive causes. The term became popular with millennials and members of Generation Z. As its use spread beyond the United States, the Oxford English Dictionary recorded the use of "wokery" as a disparaging characterization of "[p]rogressive or left-wing attitudes or practices" from 2016, and added the word woke in this sense in 2017.

By 2019, the term was widely being used sarcastically as a pejorative by conservatives, as a way to disparage socially liberal movements as superficial and insincere performative activism. This usage of woke largely supplanted the term social justice warrior. In the mid-2020s, a number of political commentators also announced the appearance of a "woke right", meaning supporters of right-wing views using cancel culture and similar tactics used by left-wing activists to enforce conservative beliefs. The terms woke-washing and woke capitalism later emerged to criticize businesses and brands who use politically progressive messaging for financial gain.

== Origins and usage ==
In some varieties of African-American English, woke is used in place of woken, the usual past participle form of wake. This has led to the use of woke as an adjective equivalent to awake, which has become mainstream in the United States. While it is not known when being awake was first used as a metaphor for political engagement and activism, one early example in the United States was the paramilitary youth organization the Wide Awakes, which formed in Hartford, Connecticut, in 1860 to support the Republican candidate in the 1860 presidential election, Abraham Lincoln. Local chapters of the group spread rapidly across northern cities in the ensuing months and "triggered massive popular enthusiasm" around the election. The political militancy of the group also alarmed many southerners, who saw in the Wide Awakes confirmation of their fears of northern, Republican political aggression. The support among the Wide Awakes for abolition, as well as the participation of a number of black men in a Wide Awakes parade in Massachusetts, likely contributed to such anxiety.

=== 20th century ===
Wake up Ethiopia! Wake up Africa! Let us work towards the one glorious end of a free, redeemed and mighty nation. —Marcus Garvey, Philosophy and Opinions (1923)

One of the earliest uses of the idea of wokeness as a concept for black political consciousness came from Jamaican philosopher and social activist Marcus Garvey, who wrote in 1923, "Wake up Ethiopia! Wake up Africa!" In a collection of aphorisms published that year, Garvey expanded the metaphor: "Wake up Ethiopia! Wake up Africa! Let us work towards the one glorious end of a free, redeemed and mighty nation. Let Africa be a bright star among the constellation of nations." This sentiment was later echoed by singer Lauryn Hill during her 2002 live album MTV Unplugged No. 2.0, where she urged listeners to "wake up and rebel".

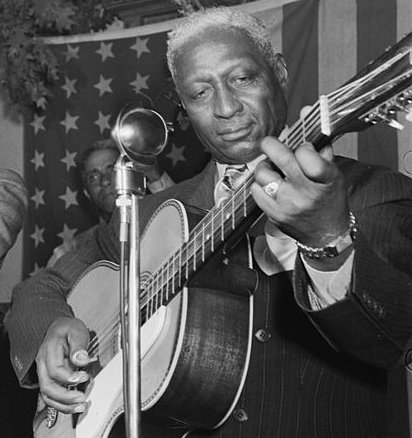
Folk singer-songwriter Lead Belly used the phrase "stay woke" on a 1938 recording of his song "Scottsboro Boys".

Black American folk singer-songwriter Huddie Ledbetter, a.k.a. Lead Belly, used the phrase "stay woke" as part of a spoken afterword to a 1938 recording of his song "Scottsboro Boys", which tells the story of nine black teenagers and young men falsely accused of raping two white women in Alabama in 1931. In the recording, Lead Belly says he met with the defendant's lawyer and the young men themselves, and "I advise everybody, be a little careful when they go along through there (Scottsboro) – best stay woke, keep their eyes open." Aja Romano writes at Vox that this usage reflects "black Americans' need to be aware of racially motivated threats and the potential dangers of white America."

By the mid-20th century, woke had come to mean 'well-informed' or 'aware', especially in a political or cultural sense. The Oxford English Dictionary traces the earliest such usage to a 1962 New York Times Magazine article titled "If You're Woke You Dig It" by African-American novelist William Melvin Kelley, describing the appropriation of black slang by white beatniks. Woke had gained more political connotations by 1971 when the play Garvey Lives! by Barry Beckham included the line: "I been sleeping all my life. And now that Mr. Garvey done woke me up, I'm gon' stay woke. And I'm gon help him wake up other black folk."

=== 2008–2014: #Staywoke hashtag ===
Through the late 2000s and early 2010s, woke was used either as a term for literal wakefulness, or as slang for suspicions of infidelity. The latter meaning was used in singer Childish Gambino's 2016 song "Redbone". In the 21st century's first decade, the use of woke encompassed the earlier meaning with an added sense of being "alert to social and/or racial discrimination and injustice".

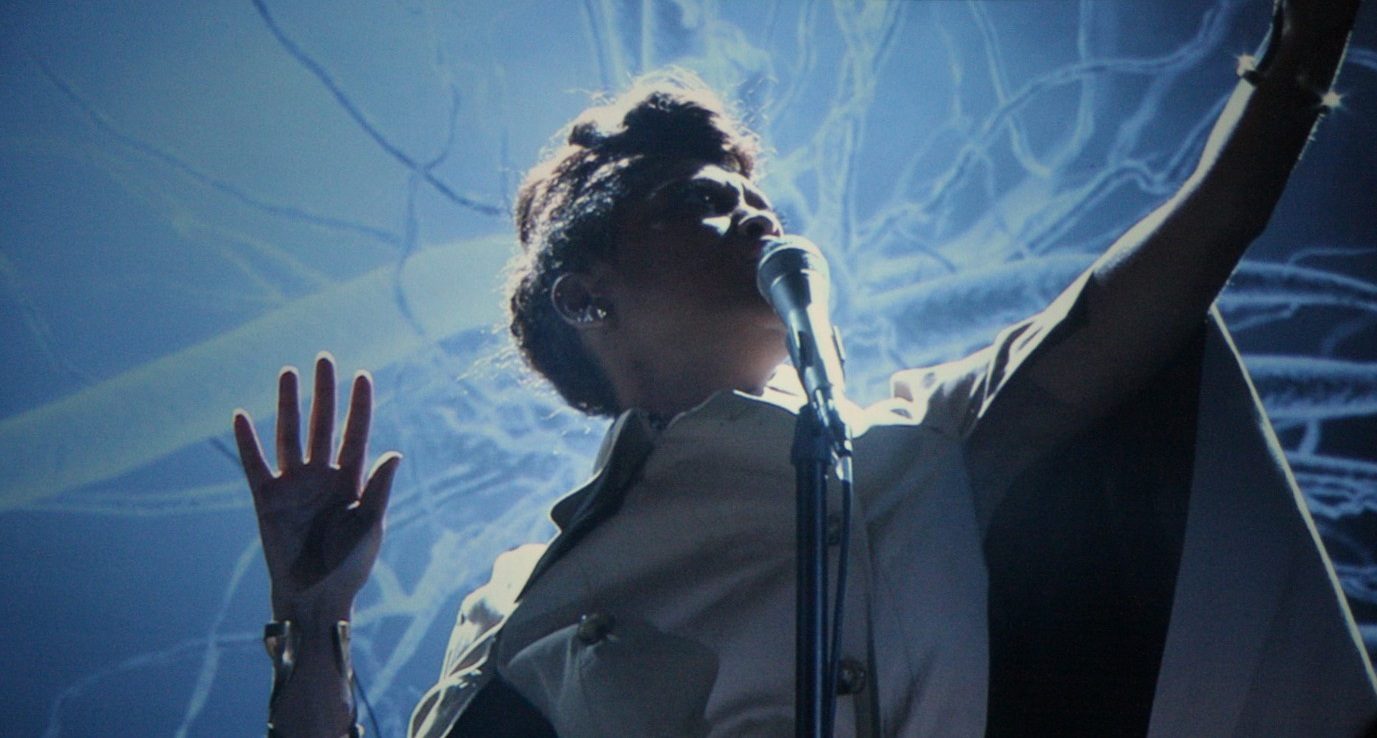
"Master Teacher", a 2008 song by the American singer Erykah Badu (pictured in 2012), included the term "stay woke".

This usage was popularized by soul singer Erykah Badu's 2008 song "Master Teacher", via the song's refrain, "I stay woke". Merriam-Webster defines the expression stay woke in Badu's song as meaning, "self-aware, questioning the dominant paradigm and striving for something better"; and, although within the context of the song, it did not yet have a specific connection to justice issues, Merriam-Webster credits the phrase's use in the song with its later connection to these issues.

Songwriter Georgia Anne Muldrow, who composed "Master Teacher" in 2005, told Okayplayer news and culture editor Elijah Watson that while she was studying jazz at New York University, she learned the invocation Stay woke from Harlem alto saxophonist Lakecia Benjamin, who used the expression in the meaning of trying to "stay woke" because of tiredness or boredom, "talking about how she was trying to stay up – like literally not pass out". In homage, Muldrow wrote stay woke in marker on a T-shirt, which over time became suggestive of engaging in the process of the search for herself (as distinct from, for example, merely personal productivity).

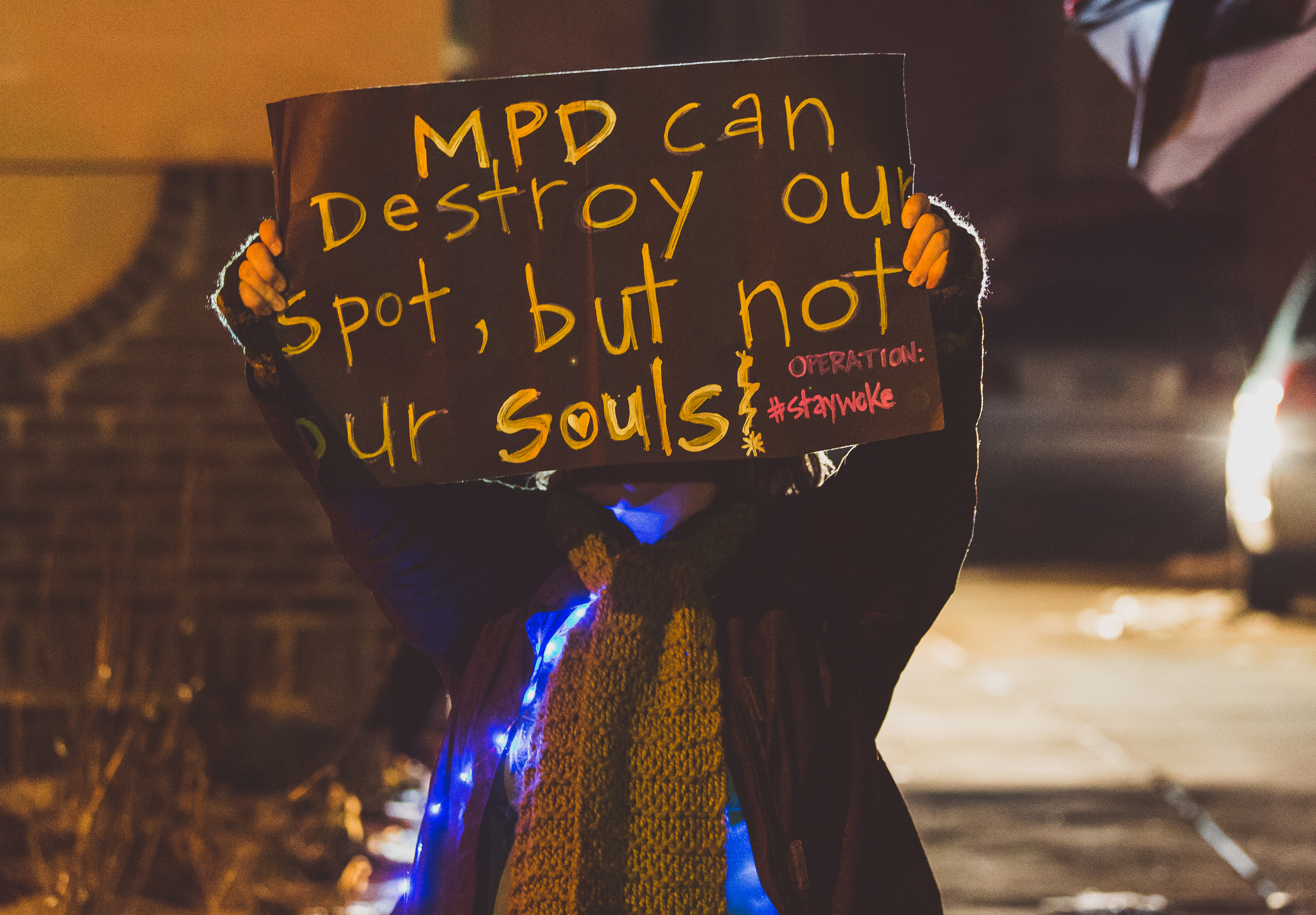
"#StayWoke" hashtag on a placard during a December 2015 protest in Minneapolis

According to The Economist, as the term woke and the #Staywoke hashtag began to spread online, the term "began to signify a progressive outlook on a host of issues as well as on race". In a tweet mentioning the Russian feminist rock group Pussy Riot, whose members were imprisoned in 2012, Badu wrote: "Truth requires no belief. Stay woke. Watch closely. #FreePussyRiot". This has been cited by Know Your Meme as one of the first examples of the #Staywoke hashtag.

=== 2014–2015: Black Lives Matter ===
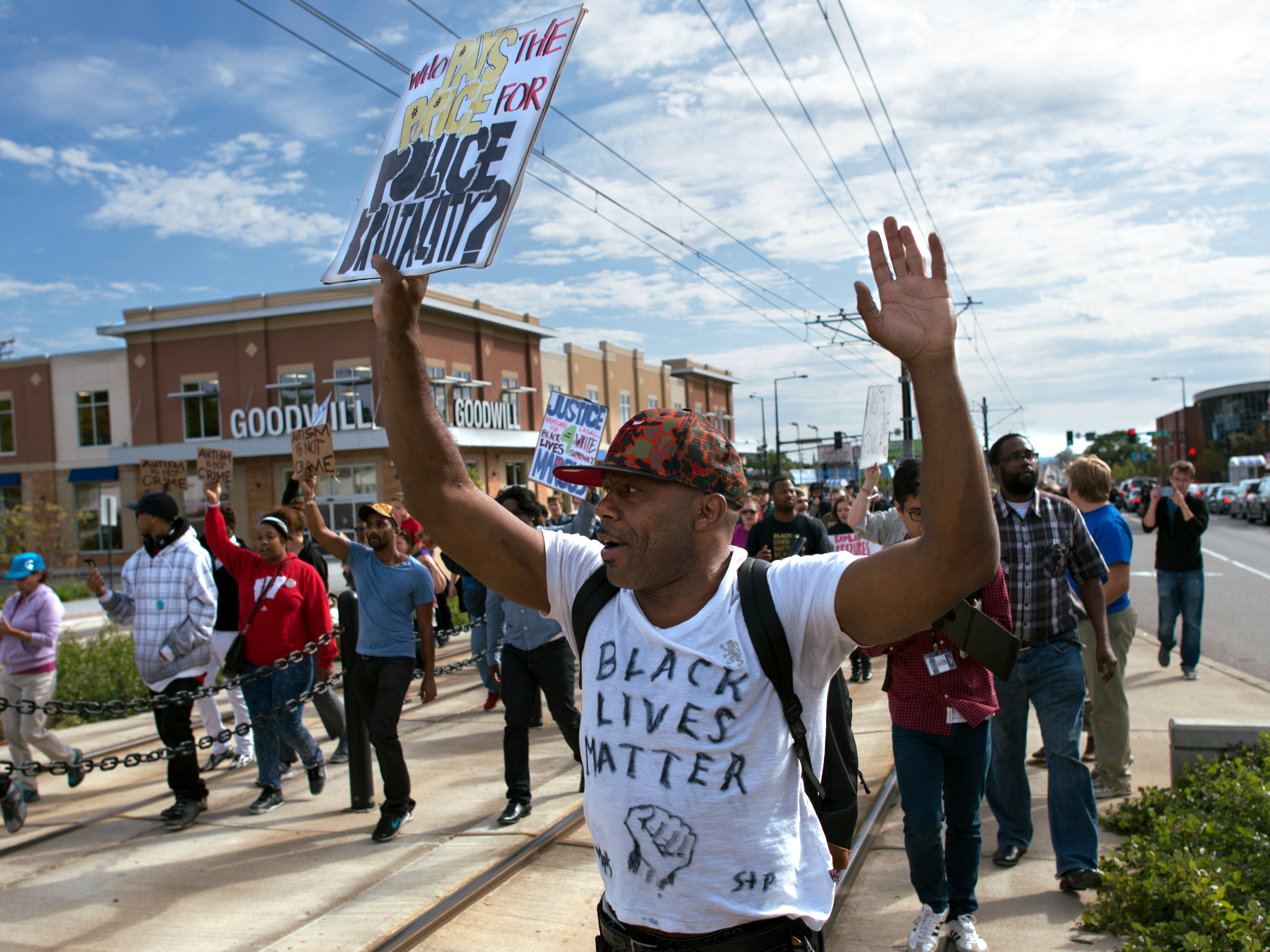
A 2015 protest in St. Paul by Black Lives Matter supporters against police brutality

Following the shooting of Michael Brown in 2014, the phrase stay woke was used by activists of the Black Lives Matter (BLM) movement to urge awareness of police abuses. The BET documentary Stay Woke, which covered the movement, aired in May 2016. Within the decade of the 2010s, the word woke (the colloquial, passively voiced past participle of wake) obtained the meaning 'politically and socially aware' among BLM activists.

=== 2015–2019: Broadening usage ===
While the term woke initially pertained to issues of racial prejudice and discrimination impacting African Americans, it came to be used by other activist groups with different causes. While there is no single agreed-upon definition of the term, it came to be primarily associated with ideas that involve identity and race and which are promoted by progressives, such as the notion of white privilege or slavery reparations for African Americans. According to communication studies scholar Gordana Lazić, woke refers to "a heightened awareness of social inequalities and injustices". Vox's Aja Romano writes that woke evolved into a "single-word summation of leftist political ideology, centered on social justice politics and critical race theory". Columnist David Brooks wrote in 2017 that "to be woke is to be radically aware and justifiably paranoid. It is to be cognizant of the rot pervading the power structures." Sociologist Marcyliena Morgan contrasts woke with cool in the context of maintaining dignity in the face of social injustice: "While coolness is empty of meaning and interpretation and displays no particular consciousness, woke is explicit and direct regarding injustice, racism, sexism, etc."

The term woke became increasingly common on Black Twitter, the community of African American users of the social media platform Twitter. André Brock, a professor of black digital studies at the Georgia Institute of Technology, suggested that the term proved popular on Twitter because its brevity suited the platform's 140-character limit. According to Charles Pulliam-Moore, the term began crossing over into general internet usage as early as 2015. The phrase stay woke became an Internet meme, with searches for woke on Google surging in 2015.

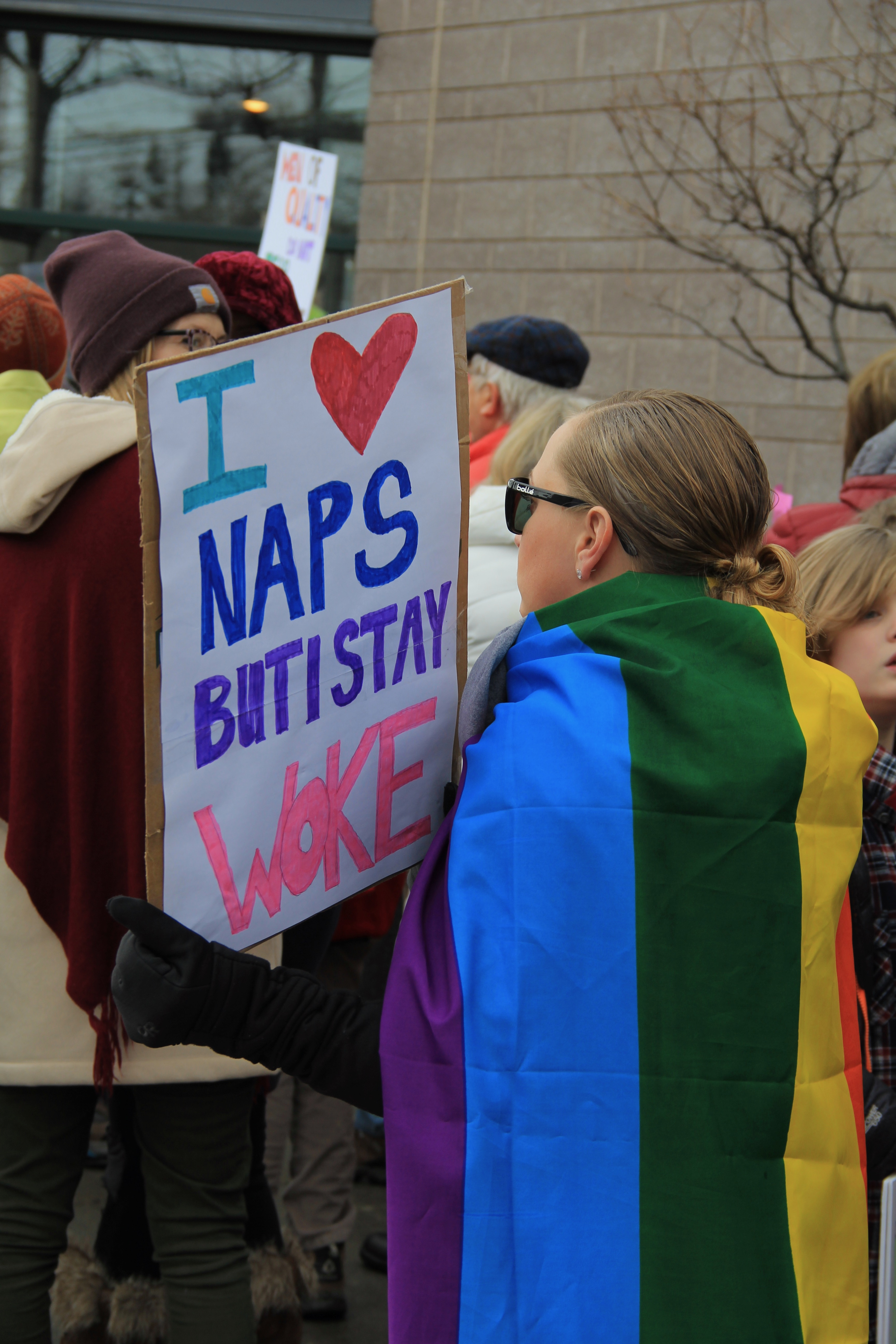
Protester at a 2018 Women's March event in Missoula, Montana

The term has gained popularity amid an increasing leftward turn on various issues among the American Left; this has partly been a reaction to the right-wing politics of U.S. President Donald Trump, who was elected in 2016, but also to a growing awareness regarding the extent of historical discrimination faced by African Americans. According to Perry Bacon Jr., ideas that have come to be associated with "wokeness" include a rejection of American exceptionalism; a belief that the United States has never been a true democracy; that people of color suffer from systemic and institutional racism; that white Americans experience white privilege; that African Americans deserve reparations for slavery and post-enslavement discrimination; that disparities among racial groups, for instance in certain professions or industries, are automatic evidence of discrimination; that U.S. law enforcement agencies are designed to discriminate against people of color and so should be defunded, disbanded, or heavily reformed; that women suffer from systemic sexism; that individuals should be able to identify with any gender or none; that U.S. capitalism is deeply flawed; and that Trump's election to the presidency was not an aberration but a reflection of the prejudices about people of color held by large parts of the U.S. population. Although increasingly accepted across much of the American Left, many of these ideas were nevertheless unpopular among the U.S. population as a whole and among other, especially more centrist, parts of the Democratic Party.

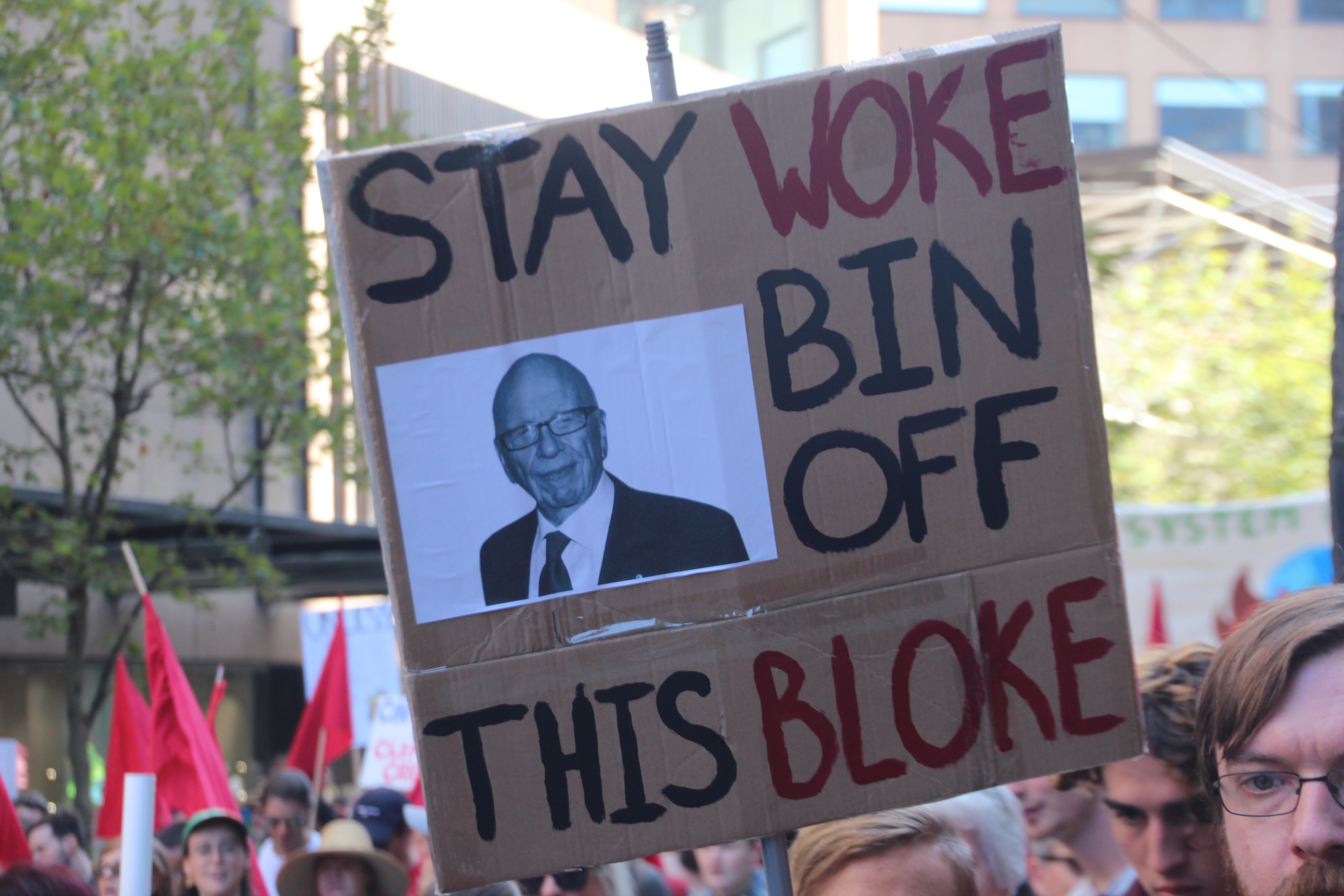
Placard criticising media mogul Rupert Murdoch at an environmentalist protest in Melbourne, Australia in 2020

The term increasingly came to be identified with millennials and members of Generation Z. Les Echos lists woke among several terms adopted by Generation Z that indicate "a societal turning point" in France. In May 2016, MTV News identified woke as being among ten words teenagers "should know in 2016". The American Dialect Society voted woke the slang word of the year in 2017. In the same year, the term was included as an entry in Oxford English Dictionary. By 2019, the term woke was increasingly being used in an ironic sense, as reflected in the books Woke by comedian Andrew Doyle (using the pen name Titania McGrath) and Anti-Woke by columnist Brendan O'Neill. By 2022, usage of the term had spread beyond the United States, attracting criticism by right-wing political figures in Europe.

=== 2019–present: emergence of pejorative use ===
By 2019, opponents of progressive social movements were using the term mockingly or sarcastically, implying that "wokeness" was an insincere form of performative activism. Woke has been used ironically by the right wing to ridicule perceived left-wing "social justice warriors" and "snowflakes", in connection with mockery of Millennials and Gen Z. Author Sergio C. Fanjul writes that some leftists, such as writer Daniel Bernabé and philosopher Susan Neiman, criticize wokeness as a form of tribalism which divides the working class and distracts from the universalist class struggle. The term performative wokeness has been used to refer to social media activity perceived as a self-serving and superficial form of activism, i.e. "slacktivism". British journalist Steven Poole comments that the term woke is used to mock "overrighteous liberalism". This pejorative sense of woke means "following an intolerant and moralising ideology" according to The Economist.

A 2025 study in Research & Politics found generally broad agreement among Democrats and Republicans about what is woke, associating it with progressive positions on race and gender. However, Democrats associated the term with a larger range of racially and gender-progressive positions, while Republicans associated it more strongly with positions that they perceive as Democratic beliefs.

==== Americas ====
===== Canada =====
As in the United States, the term woke is used by those on the political right wing in Canada to discredit individuals and policies they consider to be overly progressive. During a debate in 2023 on the Law Society of Alberta's 2020 adoption of a rule which made certain Continuing Professional Development (CPD) training courses on Indigenous Canadian history obligatory, a lawyer from the Justice Centre for Constitutional Freedoms wrote an op-ed arguing that the course was a form of "wokeness". in the 2025 Canada federal election, Conservative Party leader Pierre Poilievre weaponized the term in his campaign, characterizing "social justice advocacy as an authoritarian threat".

===== Latin America =====
Brazilian federal deputy Kim Kataguiri has accused the government under president Lula da Silva of promoting a "woke agenda" with a proposal to tax streaming services and social media networks while requiring a certain amount of content to come from Brazilian companies with 51% of capital and shareholders belonging to "identity groups".

===== United States =====
Among American conservatives and centrists, woke has come to be used primarily as an insult. Members of the Republican Party have been increasingly using the term to criticize members of the Democratic Party, while more centrist Democrats use it against more left-leaning members of their own party; such critics accuse those on their left of using cancel culture to damage the employment prospects of those who are not considered sufficiently woke. Perry Bacon Jr. suggests that this "anti-woke posture" is connected to a long-standing promotion of backlash politics by the Republican Party, wherein it promotes white and conservative fear in response to activism by African Americans as well as changing cultural norms. Those using the term pejoratively often believe that the extent of social problems have been exaggerated by such movements as Black Lives Matter.

Among the uses by Republicans is the Stop WOKE Act, a law that limits discussion of racism in Florida schools. A program of eliminating books by LGBT and black authors from schools was conducted by the Florida government and by vigilantes calling themselves "woke busters". Florida governor and former presidential candidate Ron DeSantis has frequently used the term, referring to his state as a place "where woke goes to die".

Linguist and social critic John McWhorter argues that the history of woke is similar to that of politically correct, another term once used self-descriptively by the left which was appropriated by the right as an insult, in a process similar to the euphemism treadmill. Romano compares woke to canceled as a term for "'political correctness' gone awry" among the American right wing. Attacking the idea of wokeness, along with other ideas such as cancel culture and critical race theory, became a large part of Republican Party electoral strategy. Beginning in the first presidency of Donald Trump, commentators from the alt-right, religious right, moderate liberals, and libertarians have attacked "woke" ideas and the "woke mind virus", a phrase popularized by Elon Musk, as existential threats to American society. Trump stated in 2021 that the Biden administration was "destroying" the country "with woke", and Republican Missouri senator Josh Hawley used the term to promote his upcoming book by saying the "woke mob" was trying to suppress it. According to USA Today, the term woke has been "co-opted by GOP activists".

====== Woke right ======
By 2025, conservative commentators such as Rod Dreher and James A. Lindsay had begun using the term "woke right" to characterize far-right beliefs as a mirror of the far left. Political commentator Jonathan Chait has described paleoconservative commentator Pat Buchanan, who criticized the liberalism of the Obama era in a way that prefigured Trumpism, as the "godfather" of the "woke right". Linguist John McWhorter writes that semantic broadening of the term "woke" resulted in a shift in its meaning to "a conspiracy-focused and punitive orientation to social change", regardless of left–right orientation. Gregory Conti and Aaron Sibarium described the rise of the woke right and "antiwokeness" as having "eroded taboos against open bigotry" and causing conservatives to move "further to the right on race and gender". They argued that conservatives now "increasingly reject as cancel culture any public repudiation of genuinely fringe ideas, creating a subculture of racism, sexism and antisemitism". The term "woke right" has also been used by pro-Israel sources to describe American conservatives who became increasingly critical of Israel during the Gaza war.

Following the assassination of Charlie Kirk, right-wing activists and the U.S. government undertook a wide-reaching campaign to punish critics of Kirk for allegedly celebrating his death that soon turned into policing any criticism of Kirk or his ideology. Author Jonathan Rauch of the Brookings Institution has characterized it as a "woke right" campaign paralleling earlier efforts to suppress right-wing speech on college campuses.

==== Asia ====
===== India =====
In India, the term is used as a pejorative by Hindutva activists and Hindu nationalists to refer to the critics of the Hindu nationalist ideology who are deemed as anti-Hindu by the Hindu nationalist organizations such as the Rashtriya Swayamsevak Sangh. The term is also synonymous with leftism in news headlines and is commonly used in social media circles by critics of secularism in India.

==== Europe ====
===== Central Europe =====
In Hungary, politician Balázs Orbán stated that "we [Hungary] will not give up fighting against woke ideology". In Switzerland, members of the youth wing of the right-wing populist Swiss People's Party have criticized Swiss bank UBS for its diversity policies, calling them "woke".

===== France =====
The phenomenon le wokisme, sometimes translated 'wokeism', has been used in French politics to criticize anti-racist movements and leftist scholarship, particularly since the 2022 French presidential election. Much of the opposition to le wokisme sees it as an American import, incompatible with French values. Mohamed Amer Meziane reported that then-education minister Jean-Michel Blanquer, organized a conference at which he argued "woke" ideology "plots against the greatness of a white European civilization" and is therefore an "anti-Republican political religion". Blanquer established an "anti-woke think tank" in opposition to what is perceived as an export from the English-speaking world. This view also includes a conspiracy theory connecting "wokism" with pre-existing right-wing conspiracy theories of "Islamo-leftism", suggesting that leftists are manipulated by Islamists to replace European white-Christian civilization with Islam. In this context, "woke" is used pejoratively to describe progressive, anti-colonial, and anti-racist positions that are seen as incompatible with traditional French values.

According to French sociologist and political scientist Alain Policar, woke originated from African American communities to describe awareness of social injustices and has been used pejoratively by French politicians from the former republican left, the right and the far right to label individuals engaged in anti-racist, feminist, LGBTQ, and environmental movements. This derogatory usage gave rise to the noun wokisme, suggesting a homogeneous political movement propagating an alleged woke ideology.

French philosopher Pierre-Henri Tavoillot characterizes wokeism as a corpus of theories revolving around "identity, gender and race", with the core principle of "revealing and condemning concealed forms of domination", positing that all aspects of society can be reduced to a "dynamic of oppressor and oppressed", with those oblivious to this notion deemed "complicit", while the "awakened (woke)" advocate for the "abolition (cancel) of anything perceived to sustain such oppression", resulting in practical implementations such as adopting inclusive language, reconfiguring education or deconstructing gender norms.

===== United Kingdom =====
In the United Kingdom, anti-wokeness discourse is driven primarily by Conservative Party politicians and right-wing media outlets. Conservative papers such as The Daily Telegraph and Daily Mail commonly publish articles critical of what they deem to be woke. The Mail on Sunday publishes an annual "Woke List" criticising public figures for perceived "virtue signalling". The right-wing television channel GB News was proclaimed at its founding to be explicitly anti-woke. Its onetime chairman Andrew Neil has presented a regular segment on the channel entitled "Wokewatch", which aims to be a counter-voice to "woke warriors".

The term woke is often used as a pejorative by conservative figures. During the run-up to the 2024 general election, the governing Conservative Party attracted criticism for attempting to create a culture war based on the woke concept. While promoting her book The Abuse of Power in 2023, former Conservative prime minister Theresa May declared herself to be woke, in the sense of "somebody who recognizes that discrimination takes place". In a survey by YouGov, 73% of Britons who used the term said they did so in a disapproving way, 11% in an approving way and 14% neither used it in an approving or disapproving way. Columnist Zoe Williams writes in The Guardian that public discourse around cycling has become "the perfect microcosm of the wokeness split in all its forms", with anti-cycling voices portraying cyclists as a "lunatic fringe".

==== Oceania ====
During the 2022 Australian federal election campaign, both Scott Morrison, then-prime minister and leader of the centre-right Liberal Party, and Anthony Albanese, the subsequently elected prime minister and leader of the centre-left Australian Labor Party, insisted they were not "woke". Peter Dutton, former Opposition Leader and leader of the Coalition, has also used the term several times before. Members of minor right-wing parties, especially Pauline Hanson's One Nation and the United Australia Party, also frequently use the term.

In the 2025 Australian federal election campaign opposition leader Dutton stated that he wanted to rid the schooling and university system of "woke" policies. In New Zealand, former deputy prime minister and leader of the New Zealand First Party, Winston Peters, referred to the government led by Jacinda Ardern and the New Zealand Labour Party as a "woke guilt industry". Then–opposition leader Judith Collins also referred to Ardern as "woke". In March 2025, Peters declared a "war on woke" during his "State of the Nation" speech, taking aim at DEI, sexual education programs at schools, and "Cultural Marxism".

== Reception and legacy ==
Scholars Michael B. McCormack and Althea Legal-Miller argue that the phrase stay woke echoes Martin Luther King Jr.'s exhortation "to stay awake, to adjust to new ideas, to remain vigilant and to face the challenge of change".

Writer and activist Chloé Valdary has stated that the concept of being woke is a "double-edged sword" that can "alert people to systemic injustice" while also being "an aggressive, performative take on progressive politics that only makes things worse". Social-justice scholars Tehama Lopez Bunyasi and Candis Watts Smith, in their 2019 book Stay Woke: A People's Guide to Making All Black Lives Matter, argue against what they term as "Woker-than-Thou-itis: Striving to be educated around issues of social justice is laudable and moral, but striving to be recognized by others as a woke individual is self-serving and misguided." Essayist Maya Binyam, writing in The Awl, ironized about a seeming contest among players who "name racism when it appears" or who disparage "folk who are lagging behind".

Linguist Ben Zimmer writes that, with mainstream currency, the term's "original grounding in African-American political consciousness has been obscured". The Economist states that as the term came to be used more to describe white people active on social media, black activists "criticised the performatively woke for being more concerned with internet point-scoring than systemic change". Journalist Amanda Hess says social media accelerated the word's cultural appropriation, writing, "The conundrum is built in. When white people aspire to get points for consciousness, they walk right into the cross hairs between allyship and appropriation." Hess describes woke as "the inverse of 'politically correct' ... It means wanting to be considered correct, and wanting everyone to know just how correct you are".

In 2021, the British filmmaker and DJ Don Letts suggested that "in a world so woke you can't make a joke", it was difficult for young artists to make protest music without being accused of cultural appropriation. Critics on the left have also emerged such as Slavoj Žižek, Susan Neiman, and Umut Özkirimli, who see it as yet another facet of neoliberalism.

=== Woke 2.0 ===
During the second presidency of Donald Trump, Woke 2.0 and the closely related Dark Woke developed as terms to refer to a new phase and style of progressive politics as well as an attempt to reappropriate the word that had become largely used as an insult. Commentators have characterized Woke 2.0 in part as an ironic declaration that woke politics has returned or is coming soon, noting that figures Ben Collins, Hasan Piker, and author Kylie Cheung have all joked about the return of woke. Others have used the term to seriously discuss the progressive response to the second Trump administration. Thomas Chatterton Williams, who was previously a prominent critic of woke, has stated some anti-woke backlash such as the lawsuit against Harvard has gone too far, and suggested Zohran Mamdani could be a model of progressiveness that focuses on economic issues rather than identity issues during Woke 2.0.

== Woke-washing and woke capitalism ==
By the mid-2010s, language associated with wokeness had entered the mainstream media and was being used for marketing. Examples have included Nike's social-justice campaign featuring Colin Kaepernick, a Pepsi advertisement featuring Kendall Jenner, and Gillette's commentary on toxic masculinity. In 2018, African-American journalist Sam Sanders argued that the authentic meaning of woke was being lost to overuse by white liberals and co-option by businesses trying to appear progressive (woke-washing), which would ultimately create a backlash.

The term woke capitalism was coined by writer Ross Douthat for brands that used politically progressive messaging as a substitute for genuine reform. According to The Economist, examples of "woke capitalism" include advertising campaigns designed to appeal to millennials, who often hold more socially liberal views than earlier generations. Abas Mirzaei, a senior lecturer in branding at Macquarie University, says brands "without a clear moral purpose" who use social-justice messages in advertising have been increasingly perceived as inauthentic, damaging the concept of wokeness and spawning the meme "get woke, go broke".

Cultural scientists Akane Kanai and Rosalind Gill describe "woke capitalism" as the "dramatically intensifying" trend to include historically marginalized groups (currently primarily in terms of race, gender, and religion) as mascots in advertisement with a message of empowerment to signal progressive values. On the one hand, Kanai and Gill argue that this creates an individualized and depoliticized idea of social justice, reducing it to an increase in self-confidence; on the other hand, the omnipresent visibility in advertising can also amplify a backlash against the equality of precisely these minorities. These would become mascots not only of the companies using them, but of the unchallenged neoliberal economic system with its socially unjust order itself. For the economically weak, the equality of these minorities would thus become indispensable to the maintenance of this economic system; the minorities would be seen responsible for the losses of this system.

== See also ==
- 2020s critical race theory controversies – Grassroots social movement
- Baizuo – Derogatory Chinese neologism
- Color-blind casting – Casting practice in the performing arts
- Cultural Marxism – Far-right antisemitic conspiracy theory
- Dark Woke – Style of progressive politics coined in 2025
- Diversity, equity, and inclusion – Organizational frameworks and programs
- Feminazi – Pejorative term for feminists
- Great Awakening – Christian revivals in American history
- Intersectionality – Theory of discrimination
- Political correctness – Measures to avoid offense or disadvantage
- Progressivism – Political philosophy in support of progress and/or reform
- Social liberalism – Political ideology within liberalism
- Straw feminism – Distortion or fabrication of feminist arguments
- "That one friend that's too woke"
