= Jonathan Pie =

Fictional English news reporter

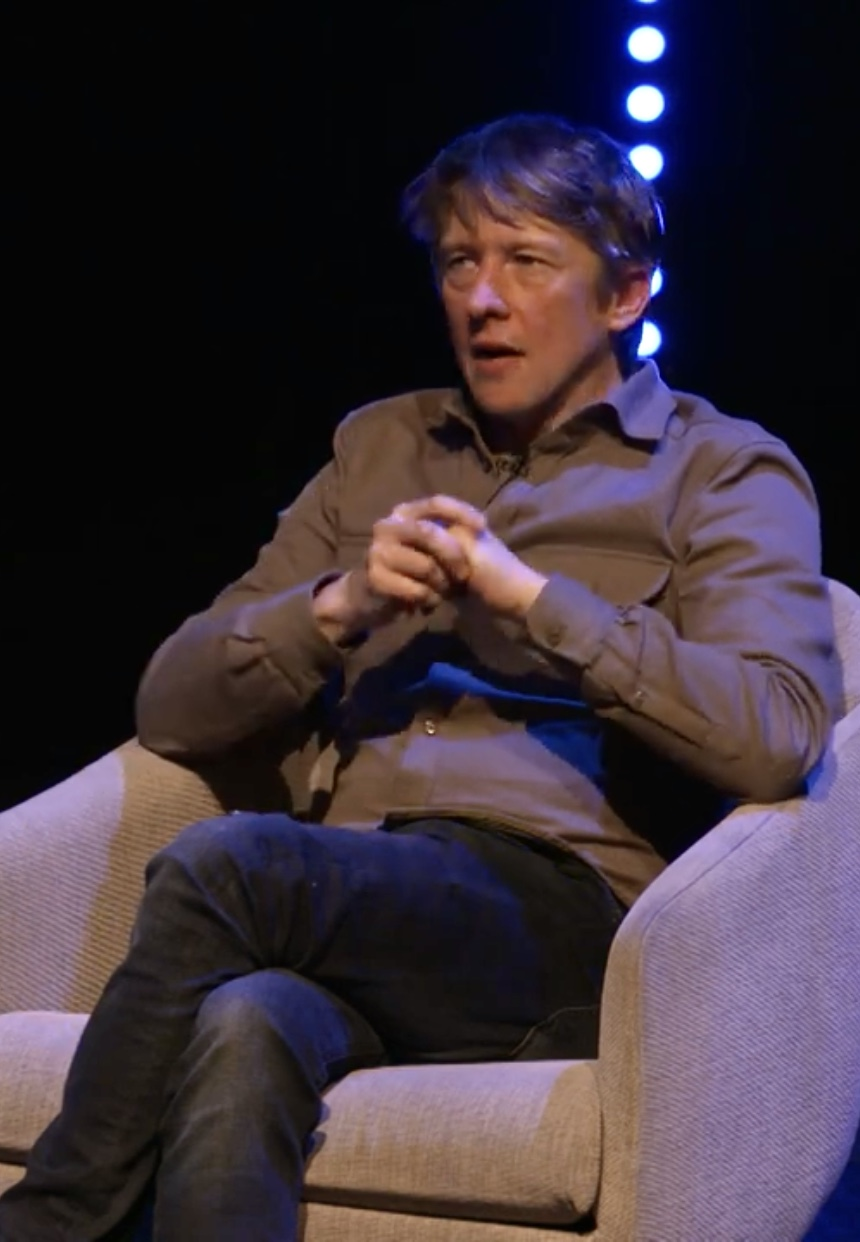
- Walker playing Jonathan Pie at the British Library in 2022
- First appearance: 21 September 2015
- Created by: Tom Walker
- Portrayed by: Tom Walker

In-universe information
- Gender: Male
- Occupation: Political correspondent

Jonathan Pie is a fictional character portrayed by English comedian Tom Walker. Pie is a political correspondent who rants angrily about Western politics with a focus on popular topics of British, American, and Australian politics, giving his true personal opinions before or after filming a scripted news segment with a mild demeanour.

== History ==
The first spoof news report featuring Pie, released just after the election of Jeremy Corbyn as leader of the Labour Party in September 2015, was responding to mainstream media reports that gave particular weight to Corbyn's past relationship with Diane Abbott. Walker was soon approached by several media companies, including RT UK. He worked with RT for several months before leaving in July 2016, just before his appearance at the Edinburgh Festival Fringe in August.

The character received international coverage after the 2016 American presidential election, when his comments on Donald Trump's victory went viral and became a YouTube trending video. As of 2026 the video had more than 4.7 million views, double that of the second-most popular.

Pie has occasionally appeared as the London correspondent for the Australian satirical news and current events programme The Weekly with Charlie Pickering.

Pie went on his second tour in 2018 with Back to the Studio. He performed 45 dates in the UK, five dates in Australia, and six dates in the US. In January 2020, a collaboration with environmental filmmaker Franny Armstrong led to Pie Net Zero, a 13-minute mockumentary. Some episodes, including the post-US election episode, were co-written with Irish comedian Andrew Doyle, who contributed to the character's early portrayals, beginning when the live show started. In a 2023 interview with Mark Steel, Walker stated that he has not worked with Doyle since 2019.

In February 2022, Pie made his first of several appearances on The New York Times website and YouTube channel as part of their "opinion" section. These videos comment on UK politics for an American audience. Topics have included Boris Johnson, the Russian invasion of Ukraine and the influence of Russian oligarchs' investments and political donations, as well as the UK energy crisis, rising inflation, and labour strikes during the tenure of Liz Truss as prime minister.

A BBC radio series, Call Jonathan Pie, features Pie unwillingly co-opted as the host of a phone-in radio show. Pie responds to fictional callers' opinions, sometimes agreeing but often not. He also engages with his production team who usually counter his own views. A range of views on complex subjects are thus encapsulated. Ten episodes were aired in 2023: "The BBC"; "Money"; "Brexit"; "Race"; "Online"; "Women"; "Comedy"; "Drugs"; "NHS"; and "The Environment". 2025's episodes were: "An Abusive Auntie", "A Strange Musk", "Arise Sir Roger", "Great British News", "Strictly Moscow", "Identity Crisis", "Japanese Wiskey", and "So Long and Thanks for All the Cash". Each episode begins with a warning about "very strong language".

== Appearances ==
=== Live tours ===
Year	Title	Notes
2016–2017	Jonathan Pie Live	51 UK dates
2018	Back to the Studio	55 UK dates & 6 Australian shows
2019	Fake News	24 UK dates
2020	Fake News: Australia	7 dates
2021	The Corona Remix	44 dates. Extended & rescheduled dates from previous tour due to COVID-19 pandemic
2024	Heroes and Villains	
2026	End of the World	

=== Filmography ===
Year	Title	Notes
2019	Jonathan Pie's American Pie	BBC Three
2021	Jonathan Pie: The World's End	Spanner films
2023, 2025	Call Jonathan Pie	Radio 4 sitcom

=== Bibliography ===
Year	Title	Notes
2017	Jonathan Pie: Off the Record	ISBN 9781911600602
