= Andrew Doyle (comedian) =

Northern Irish comedian, journalist, and political satirist

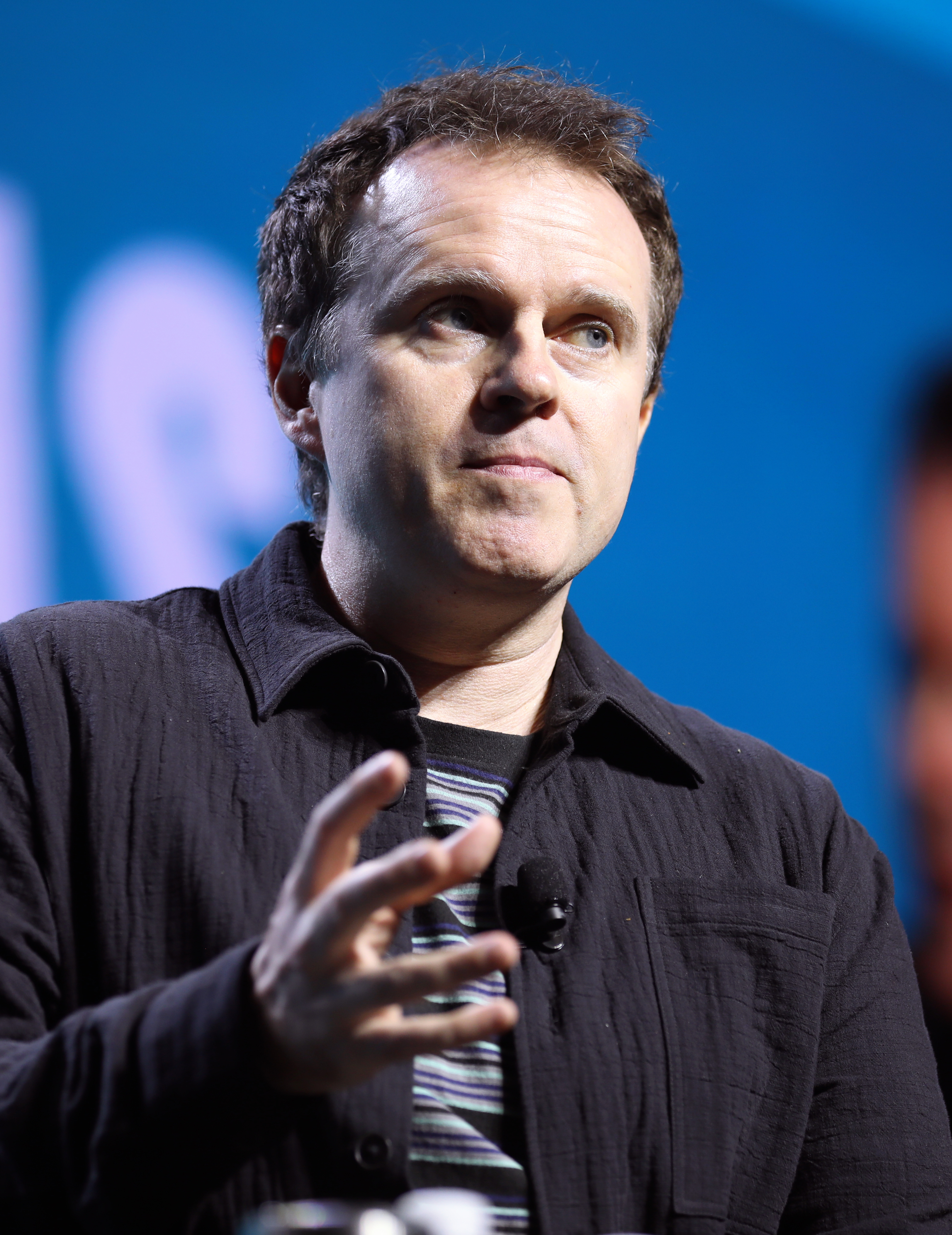
- Doyle in 2024
- Born: 1978 or 1979 (age 47–48); Derry, Northern Ireland
- Education: Aberystwyth University (BA), University of York (MA), Wadham College, Oxford (DPhil)
- Notable work: Spiked magazine, Jonathan Pie
- Relatives: Eamon Melaugh (uncle)

Comedy career
- Medium: Print, theatre, social media
- Genre: Political satire

Andrew Doyle is a playwright, journalist, and political satirist from Northern Ireland, who has written for the fictional character Jonathan Pie and created the character Titania McGrath.

== Early life and education ==
Doyle was born in Derry, Northern Ireland to a Catholic family. He completed his undergraduate studies at Aberystwyth University before obtaining a master's degree at the University of York. He holds a doctorate in early Renaissance poetry from the University of Oxford, having studied at Wadham College, Oxford.

== Career ==
Doyle regularly writes for Spiked, and runs a comedy night in London called "Comedy Unleashed". He has performed his stand-up shows at the Edinburgh Fringe Festival, four of which have also been performed at the Soho Theatre, London. He has appeared on Sky News as a commentator, and as a panel member on The Moral Maze on BBC Radio 4. He has been a speaker at the Battle of Ideas Festival in London, an annual event hosted by the Institute of Ideas.

He was previously a visiting research fellow at Queen's University, Belfast, where he worked on the writings of Forrest Reid. Doyle originally worked as a teacher, including alongside Simon Warr at Royal Hospital School.

In April 2018 Doyle created the fictional character of Titania McGrath, initially via a parody Twitter account. According to Doyle, the character was designed to mock "woke culture". The McGrath Twitter account has been suspended for hate speech four times. Doyle has written two books under the guise of the character. The first was Woke: A Guide to Social Justice published on 7 March 2019, which was followed by a parody of children's books, My First Little Book of Intersectional Activism published in September 2020. In March 2019, Doyle was contacted by Rosamund Urwin, a journalist at The Sunday Times, who asked whether he was the person behind McGrath's Twitter account, due to the inclusion of several sources in McGrath's book that he had quoted previously. Though he denied it, he later revealed himself as the man behind the account.

In February 2019, Doyle wrote a text in The Independent under the pseudonym Liam Evans. The piece expressed dismay at comedy material performed on stage. After admitting he wrote it as a hoax, Doyle claimed the newspaper had published it without sufficiently checking the writer. The Independent's executive editor said that "The suggestion [...] that it is so outlandish that it must be false, is bizarre." Doyle also pointed out that if reading the fourth letter of every sentence in the text, it spells out "Titania McGrath wrote this you gullible hacks".

Since 2021, Doyle has hosted a weekly show titled Free Speech Nation on GB News.

Doyle is a faculty member of Peterson Academy and has a course called "The Shakespearean Tragedies".

=== Publications ===
Doyle is the co-author with Tom Walker of Jonathan Pie: Off the Record (2017). He is also the author of Titania McGrath's Woke: A Guide to Social Justice (2019). It was positively received by a large number of celebrities including Ricky Gervais, as well as numerous right-leaning commentators. It was negatively reviewed by Alex Clark in The Guardian, writing that Doyle was making a cheap shot by poking fun at identity politics. Doyle used the Titania McGrath pseudonym for My First Little Book of Intersectional Activism (2020), published by Little, Brown in September 2020. He is the author of Free Speech and Why It Matters (2021) and The New Puritans: How the Religion of Social Justice Captured the Western World (2022).

== Political views ==
Doyle describes himself as left-wing and criticises political correctness and identity politics. He is a Brexit supporter. Doyle supported Jeremy Corbyn during the 2017 United Kingdom general election.

== Personal life ==
Doyle is gay. His uncle was political activist Eamonn Melaugh.

== Plays ==
- Borderland
- Jimmy Murphy Makes Amends (BBC Radio 4)
- The Second Mr Bailey (BBC Radio 4)
- Reacher's Point (BBC Radio 4)

== Bibliography ==
- Jonathan Pie: Off the Record (2017)
- (asTitania McGrath): Woke: A Guide to Social Justice (2019)
- (as Titania McGrath): My First Little Book of Intersectional Activism (2020)
- Free Speech and Why It Matters (2021)
- The New Puritans: How the Religion of Social Justice Captured the Western World (2022)
- The End Of Woke: How the Culture War Went Too Far and What to Expect from the Counter-Revolution (2025)
