= Balázs Orbán (politician) =

Hungarian lawyer, university professor and politician

Balázs Orbán MEP
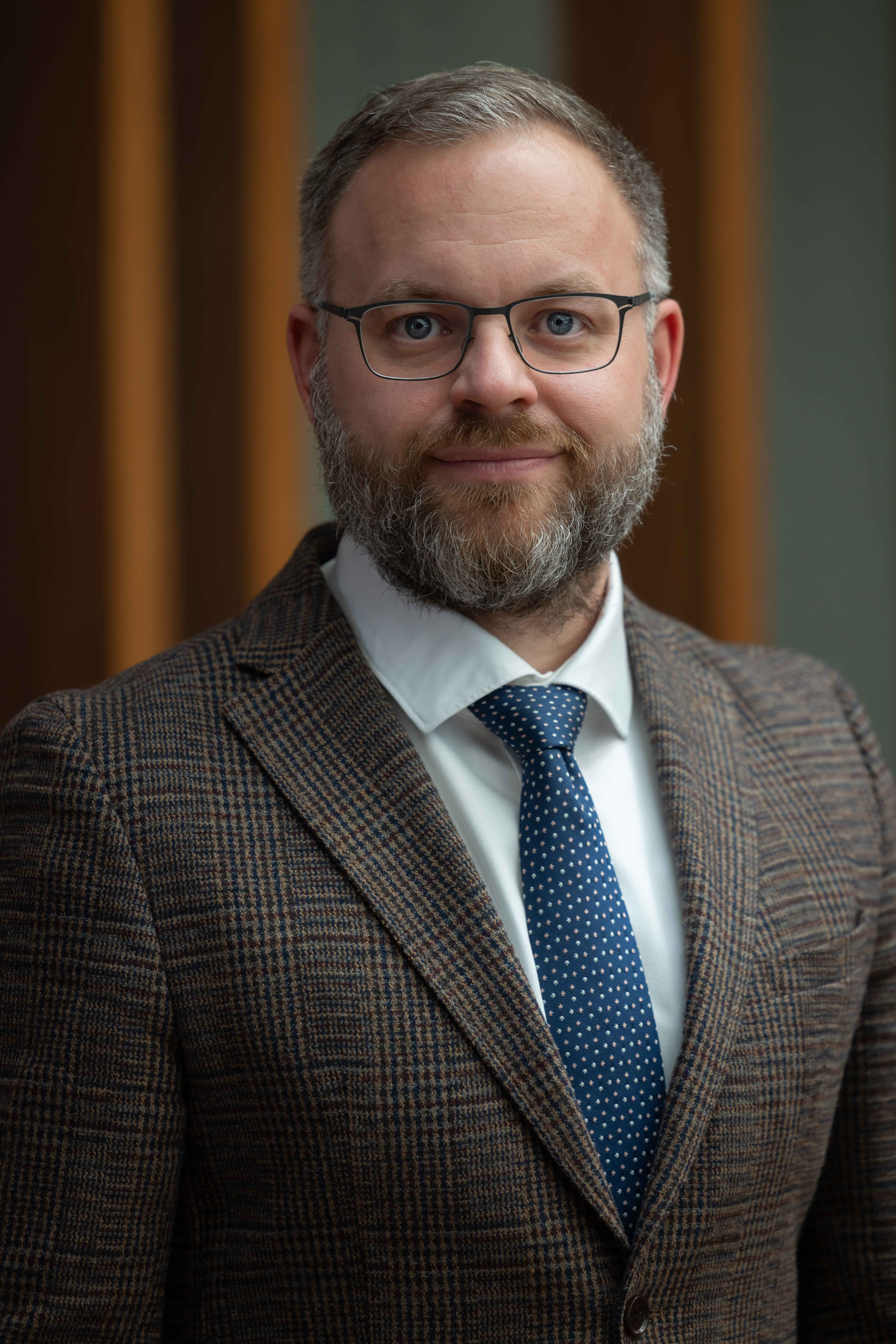
- Orbán in 2025

Political Director of the Prime Minister
- In office 21 August 2021 – 12 May 2026

Member of the National Assembly
- In office 2 May 2022 – 22 September 2026

Member of the European Parliament
- Incumbent
- Assumed office 23 September 2026

Personal details
- Born: Balázs András Orbán; February 13, 1986 (age 40) Budapest, Hungary
- Party: Fidesz
- Children: 2
- Education: Eötvös Loránd University (BA) (JD) Pázmány Péter Catholic University (LLM)

Balázs Orbán (Hungarian: [ˈbɒlaːʒ ˈorbaːn]; born 13 February 1986) is a Hungarian lawyer, university professor, and politician, who served as Political Director of Prime Minister Viktor Orbán (no relation) from 2021 to 2026 and as Deputy Minister, and Parliamentary and Strategic State Secretary to the Prime Minister's Office from 2018 to 2022. He was a member of the National Assembly from 2022 to 2026, and has served as a member of the European Parliament since 2026.

Since 2018, he has served as chairman of the advisory board at the University of Public Service. Since 2020, he has been the chairman of the Board of Trustees of the Mathias Corvinus Collegium, which has received substantial funding by Viktor Orbán government.

== Early life ==
Orbán was born in Budapest on February 13, 1986. Between 1998 and 2004 he studied at the ELTE Apáczai Csere János High School and Boarding School in Budapest. Between 2004 and 2009 he was a law student at the Eötvös Loránd University Faculty of Law, where he obtained Juris Doctor with summa cum laude. Between 2007 and 2011 he obtained a BA degree in political science at the same institution. Since 2009, he has been a PhD student at the Doctoral School of the Eötvös Loránd University Faculty of Law, where he is currently pursuing his doctoral studies. Between 2013 and 2014 he was a student at the Pázmány Péter Catholic University Faculty of Law and Political Science, where he obtained an LL.M. degree in legal regulation in public administration.

Orbán passed the public register examination in 2009, the public administration competitive examination in 2010, and the public administration examination in 2011.

== Career ==
After obtaining his degree, Orbán worked as a legal advisor in the Ministry of Justice between 2009 and 2012, performing legislation codification and law preparation tasks.

=== Teaching career ===
Orbán has taught at various universities and colleges since graduating from university, and since 2015 he has been an assistant professor at the National University of Public Service. He has been teaching at the Mathias Corvinus Collegium since 2015, where he also serves as the chairman of the Board of Trustees, and has been in charge of the institution's renewal and overall growth strategy.

=== Research career ===
In 2012, he joined the Századvég Foundation, a conservative think tank, as a regulatory expert. He became the foundation's research director in 2013, managing and coordinating public law and public policy research until 2018.

During these years he often appeared in the media, and his analyses were published regularly in various daily and weekly newspapers. Between 2016 and 2018, he was a Member of the Board of the Századvég Foundation. In 2015 he became the first director of the Migration Research Institute, a new think tank established by the Századvég Foundation and Mathias Corvinus Collegium. He held this position until his appointment as state secretary in 2018.

==== Controversy about his doctoral thesis ====
The defense of Orbán's doctoral dissertation, written under the supervision of István Kukorelli, took place on December 3, 2024, amid considerable public interest. According to Hungarian jurist and media researcher Gábor Polyák, the underfunded ELTE University, which is dependent on the government, should not have lent its name to Orbán's defense due to its political involvement. His opinion sparked public debate in the local media. The university distanced itself from the non-professional evaluation of science in a statement, and several experts emphasized the importance of academic freedom and the unacceptability of political discrimination, including Péter Hack and Szilveszter E. Vizi. Orbán himself has called the criticism politically motivated discrimination.

=== Political career ===
From May 22, 2018, Orbán has been deputy minister and parliamentary and strategic state secretary at the Office of the Prime Minister. In addition to parliamentary representation, his responsibilities include the development of government strategy, and incorporating the most important scientific findings of various domestic and foreign research institutes into the processes of government strategy and legislation.

Since 2018, Orbán has been the chairman of the advisory board of the National University of Public Service, where he is also responsible for the development and modernization of the university.

Since August 2021, Orbán has been serving as political director under Viktor Orbán, advising the Prime Minister on political, social, economic, public policy, and other matters. Additionally, he coordinates the work of the Prime Minister's advisers.

Following his appointment on May 25, 2022, he continued his tenure as political director in the Fifth Orbán Government, expanding his role of assisting the decision-making of the Prime Minister. Orbán is responsible for the preparation of necessary background materials, briefings, and analyses related to the Prime Minister's work, coordinating his international activities, as well as monitoring general political, strategic, foreign policy, and public policy aspects of government decision-making and decision preparation.

Orbán has been serving as MP since the 2022 Hungarian parliamentary election.

On April 25, 2023, he was appointed to oversee the Institute of International Affairs think tank, which aims to support the strategic decision-making in the Hungarian foreign policy.

On September 7, 2025, Prime Minister Viktor Orbán of Hungary announced at the Kötcse party convention that Balázs Orbán would be taking over from András Gyürk as head of the Fidesz campaign team until the 2026 parliamentary elections.

== Connectivity Strategy ==
Orbán is the author of the so-called "connectivity strategy" in Hungarian foreign policy, per which Hungary seeks foreign direct investment (FDI) from Western and Eastern countries alike, and refrains from "decoupling" from other nations based on ideological bloc formation. Both the United States and China have made major investments in Hungary under the Fidesz administration as a result.

At a launch event for his 2023 book about the subject, he has described Hungary as a "complex, export-oriented, innovative economy".

== Views ==
At the 2023 Tranzit Festival in Tihany, Hungary, he explained Hungary's uniqueness by saying that "(...) the European strategy should be what Hungary represents. But if Europe also represented this, then we [Hungarians] would have to come up with something else, because then we would no longer be distinctive".

Orbán has defended anti-gay measures in Hungary, such as prohibitions on same-sex marriage and same-sex adoption, saying "If the state is pushing for the policy where the marriage is only between a man and a woman, and seventy per cent of the people want this, it’s not tyranny of the majority."

Orbán has criticised Ukrainian resistance to the Russian invasion, describing it as "irresponsible". In 2024, he said that Hungary would not resist a hypothetical Russian invasion, citing the Soviet crackdown of the Hungarian Revolution of 1956. Gábor Török called this the “biggest political mistake of the year”.

== Personal life ==
Orbán is married, and has two children. Orbán speaks English at a professional level and German at an intermediate level.

== Works ==
Orbán has authored articles on the field of constitutional law. From 2018 to 2020, he was the columnist responsible for a legal affairs column entitled 'Precedens' in the Hungarian newspaper Mandiner.

=== Books ===
- Orbán, Balázs (2020). A magyar stratégiai gondolkodás egyszeregye (in Hungarian). Budapest: Mathias Corvinus Collegium–Tihanyi Alapítvány. ISBN 978-615-6221-01-8.
- Orbán, Balázs; Szalai, Zoltán, eds. (2019). Ezer éve Európa közepén: A magyar állam karaktere (in Hungarian). Translated by Rácz, Katalin. Budapest: Mathias Corvinus Collegium–Tihanyi Alapítvány. ISBN 978-615-80718-6-4.
- Mernyei, Ákos; Orbán, Balázs, eds. (2021). Magyarország, 2020: 50 tanulmány az elmúlt 10 évről (in Hungarian). Budapest: MCC Press Kft. ISBN 978-615-6221-02-5.
- Szalai, Zoltán; Orbán, Balázs, eds. (2021). Der ungarische Staat: Ein interdisziplinärer Überblick (in German). VS Verlag für Sozialwissenschaften, Springer. ISBN 978-3-658-27615-7.
- Orbán, Balázs (2021). A magyar stratégiai gondolkodás egyszeregye (in Hungarian). Budapest: MCC Press Kft. ISBN 978-615-6221-03-2.
  - Orbán, Balázs (27 October 2021). The Hungarian Way of Strategy. Translated by Sneddon, Thomas. Budapest: MCC Press. ISBN 978-615-6351-13-5.
- Orbán, Balázs (2023). Huszárvágás: A konnektivitás magyar stratégiája (in Hungarian). Budapest: MCC Press Kft. ISBN 978-963-6440-42-8.
  - Orbán, Balázs (2024). Hussar Cut: The Hungarian Strategy for Connectivity. Translated by Sneddon, Thomas. Budapest: MCC Press. ISBN 978-963-6440-52-7.
