= 2022 Hungarian parliamentary election results by constituency =

The following list contains results of the 2022 Hungarian parliamentary election by constituency.

== Bács-Kiskun County ==
=== District 1 ===
parliamentary election – Bács-Kiskun 1
Party	Candidate	Votes	%
Fidesz–KDNP	László Salacz	27,420	59.02%
United for Hungary	Rita Szőkéné Kopping	13,464	28.98%
Mi Hazánk	Erzsébet Erős	3,425	7.37%
MKKP	Szabolcs Kordik	1,691	3.64%
NÉP	Attiláné Ábrahám	462	0.99%
Total votes		46,462	100%

=== District 2 ===
parliamentary election – Bács-Kiskun 2
Party	Candidate	Votes	%
Fidesz–KDNP	Gyula Tamás Szeberényi	26,606	53.00%
United for Hungary	Alexandra Bodrozsán	17,208	34.28%
Mi Hazánk	Dániel Faragó	3,512	7.00%
MKKP	Ágnes Karikó	2,274	4.53%
NÉP	László Sánta	597	1.19%
Total votes		50,197	100%

=== District 3 ===
parliamentary election – Bács-Kiskun 3
Party	Candidate	Votes	%
Fidesz–KDNP	Sándor Font	26,592	59.70%
United for Hungary	Gyöngyi Mária Magóné Tóth	13,464	30.23%
Mi Hazánk	Patrik Szabó	2,778	6.24%
MEMO	Nándor Kudron-Tonigold	1,311	2.94%
NÉP	Lajos Tara	395	0.89%
Total votes		44,540	100%

=== District 4 ===
parliamentary election – Bács-Kiskun 4
Party	Candidate	Votes	%
Fidesz–KDNP	Sándor Lezsák	29,835	62.97%
United for Hungary	Kálmán Kis-Szeniczey	11,727	24.75%
Mi Hazánk	Gyula Balde	3,427	7.23%
MKKP	Bence Farkas	1,529	3.23%
MEMO	Dóra Koncz	864	1.82%
Total votes		47,382	100%

=== District 5 ===
parliamentary election – Bács-Kiskun 5
Party	Candidate	Votes	%
Fidesz–KDNP	Gábor Bányai	25,763	60.16%
United for Hungary	László Molnár	12,218	28.53%
Mi Hazánk	István Szabadi	4,205	9.82%
MEMO	Dóra Fehérvári	641	1.50%
Total votes		42,827	100%

=== District 6 ===
parliamentary election – Bács-Kiskun 6
Party	Candidate	Votes	%
Fidesz–KDNP	Róbert Zsigó	23,976	57.26%
United for Hungary	László Kiss	13,697	32.71%
Mi Hazánk	Balázs Éberling	3,017	7.21%
MKKP	Artúr Garami	827	1.98%
MEMO	Terézia Almási	354	0.85%
Total votes		41,871	100%

== Baranya County ==
=== District 1 ===
parliamentary election – Baranya 1
Party	Candidate	Votes	%
United for Hungary	Tamás Mellár	22,710	44.01%
Fidesz–KDNP	János Kővári	21,557	41.78%
Mi Hazánk	Tamás Varga	2,779	5.39%
MKKP	Richárd Nagy	1,975	4.08%
Independent	Szilvia Bognár	1,975	2.95%
MEMO	Ádám Palkó	422	0.82%
NÉP	József Hirth	391	0.76%
BS	György Sugár	114	0.22%
Total votes		52,597	100%

=== District 2 ===
parliamentary election – Baranya 2
Party	Candidate	Votes	%
Fidesz–KDNP	Péter Hoppál	22,898	44.41%
United for Hungary	László Szakács	21,226	41.17%
Mi Hazánk	Sándor Ipacs	2,829	5.49%
MKKP	Csongor Martos	2,099	4.07%
Independent	Zsolt Hencsei	837	1.62%
MEMO	Gábor Juhász	635	1.23%
NÉP	Zsuzsanna Árvainé Behán	543	1.05%
BS	László Csaba Szilágyi	489	0.95%
Total votes		51,556	100%

=== District 3 ===
parliamentary election – Baranya 3
Party	Candidate	Votes	%
Fidesz–KDNP	János Hargitai	28,172	60.44%
United for Hungary	Patrik Schwarcz-Kiefer	13,954	29.94%
Mi Hazánk	Csilla Bernáth	3,448	7.40%
MEMO	István Döbrei	826	1.77%
BS	Zoltán Kós	213	0.46%
Total votes		46,613	100%

=== District 4 ===
parliamentary election – Baranya 4
Party	Candidate	Votes	%
Fidesz–KDNP	Csaba Nagy	29,403	61.08%
United for Hungary	Lajosné Szarkándi	13,835	28.74%
Mi Hazánk	József Ács	2,575	5.35%
MKKP	Gergely Molnár-Fulmer	1,215	2.52%
Independent	Zoltán Kárpáti	760	1.58%
MEMO	Aurél Bence Vig	352	0.73%
Total votes		48,140	100%

== Békés County ==
=== District 1 ===
parliamentary election – Békés 1
Party	Candidate	Votes	%
Fidesz–KDNP	Tamás Herczeg	22,920	48.27%
United for Hungary	János Stummer	19,019	40.05%
Mi Hazánk	Dávid Gyebnár	3,167	6.67%
MKKP	Gergő Debreczeni	1,142	2.40%
MEMO	Éva Szegedi	436	0.92%
NÉP	András Szekerczés	391	0.82%
Independent	Ibolya Csurár	154	0.32%
Independent	Anett Faragó	113	0.24%
Independent	Betti Faragó	87	0.18%
Independent	Gergely Faragó	38	0.08%
Independent	Lajos Gergely Faragó	20	0.04%
Total votes		48,255	100%

=== District 2 ===
parliamentary election – Békés 2
Party	Candidate	Votes	%
Fidesz–KDNP	Béla Dankó	25,716	57.71%
United for Hungary	Gábor Kondé	13,086	29.37%
Mi Hazánk	Mihály Földesi	3,873	8.69%
MKKP	Ákos Papp	1,090	2.45%
MEMO	Ádám Takács	462	1.04%
NÉP	István Bódizs	331	0.74%
Total votes		44,558	100%

=== District 3 ===
parliamentary election – Békés 3
Party	Candidate	Votes	%
Fidesz–KDNP	József Kovács	24,623	55.76%
United for Hungary	Gábor Leel-Őssy	14,982	33.93%
Mi Hazánk	Attila Vidó	2,784	6.30%
MKKP	Csanád Molnár	828	1.88%
MEMO	Ildikó Anna Pomuczné Nagy	541	1.23%
NÉP	Dzsenifer Bódizs-Darvasi	236	0.53%
BS	György Imre Ujj	163	0.37%
Total votes		44,157	100%

=== District 4 ===
parliamentary election – Békés 4
Party	Candidate	Votes	%
Fidesz–KDNP	Norbert Erdős	22,379	49.82%
United for Hungary	Ervin Szabó	17,821	39.67%
Mi Hazánk	Gábor Schultz	2,631	5.86%
MKKP	Dávid Bódai	915	2.04%
Independent	Csaba Boros	619	1.38%
NÉP	Gyula Havasi	214	0.48%
MEMO	György Szabó	200	0.45%
BS	Ferenc Gál	144	0.32%
Total votes		44,923	100%

== Borsod-Abaúj-Zemplén County ==
=== District 1 ===
parliamentary election – Borsod-Abaúj-Zemplén 1
Party	Candidate	Votes	%
Fidesz–KDNP	Katalin Csöbör	22,978	46.50%
United for Hungary	Szabolcs Szilágyi	20,442	41.37%
Mi Hazánk	István Duzsik	3,266	6.61%
MKKP	Gabriella Pásti	1,289	2.61%
MEMO	Bence István Halmi	1,016	2.06%
NÉP	Zoltánné Loukota	296	0.60%
BS	Béla Kilián	129	0.26%
Total votes		49,416	100%

=== District 2 ===
parliamentary election – Borsod-Abaúj-Zemplén 2
Party	Candidate	Votes	%
Fidesz–KDNP	János Kiss	20,602	43.85%
United for Hungary	László Varga	20,110	42.80%
Mi Hazánk	Zoltán Pakusza	3,977	8.46%
MKKP	Gábor Kiss	1,278	2.72%
MEMO	István Tamás Simkó	551	1.17%
NÉP	Anita Szekeres	309	0.66%
BS	Istvánné Fülöp József	157	0.33%
Total votes		46,984	100%

=== District 3 ===
parliamentary election – Borsod-Abaúj-Zemplén 3
Party	Candidate	Votes	%
Fidesz–KDNP	Gábor Riz	23,686	58.93%
United for Hungary	Sándor Kiss	10,884	27.08%
Mi Hazánk	Gábor Szarvas	2,389	5.94%
Independent	Ernő Vilcsek	2,121	5.28%
MKKP	Tamás Gyurgyák	548	1.36%
MEMO	Orsolya Lenkó	222	0.55%
NÉP	István Bence Zsidek	177	0.44%
BS	Ferenc Pap	167	0.42%
Total votes		40,194	100%

=== District 4 ===
parliamentary election – Borsod-Abaúj-Zemplén 4
Party	Candidate	Votes	%
Fidesz–KDNP	Zoltán Demeter	24,636	54.39%
United for Hungary	Gábor Üveges	15,648	34.55%
Mi Hazánk	Zsuzsanna Fiszter	3,276	7.23%
MKKP	Máté Galán	856	1.89%
MEMO	László András Endre	256	0.57%
NÉP	Krisztián Pető	252	0.56%
ZÖP	Szabolcs Szántó	208	0.46%
BS	Roland Menyhért	92	0.20%
IMA	Gyula Kótai	69	0.15%
Total votes		45,293	100%

=== District 5 ===
parliamentary election – Borsod-Abaúj-Zemplén 5
Party	Candidate	Votes	%
Fidesz–KDNP	Richárd Hörcsik	27,335	60.60%
United for Hungary	Sándor Zsolt Erdei	13,526	29.99%
Mi Hazánk	István Pasztorniczky	2,614	5.80%
MKKP	Tamás Vincze	736	1.63%
MEMO	Róbert Ornyik	257	0.57%
NÉP	Zoltán Varga	206	0.46%
Independent	Gábor Stefán	180	0.40%
Independent	Róbert Balogh	169	0.37%
BS	Béla Glonci	83	0.18%
Total votes		45,106	100%

=== District 6 ===
parliamentary election – Borsod-Abaúj-Zemplén 6
Party	Candidate	Votes	%
Fidesz–KDNP	Zsófia Koncz	29,737	59.00%
United for Hungary	Gábor Jézsó	18,618	36.94%
Independent	József Macskás	732	1.45%
MEMO	Ádám Veszprémi	558	1.11%
NÉP	Sándor Molnár	523	1.04%
BS	György Papp	237	0.47%
Total votes		50,405	100%

=== District 7 ===
parliamentary election – Borsod-Abaúj-Zemplén 7
Party	Candidate	Votes	%
Fidesz–KDNP	András Tállai	29,907	60.42%
United for Hungary	Ádám Sermer	13,343	26.96%
Mi Hazánk	János Szajlai	3,721	7.52%
MKKP	Sándor Blau	1,000	2.02%
MEMO	Gyula Kertész	592	1.20%
NÉP	László Kovács	335	0.68%
Independent	Zoltán Nótár	230	0.46%
Independent	Éva Farkas	177	0.36%
BS	Péter Kóródi	103	0.21%
Independent	Balázs Máté Nótár	90	0.18%
Total votes		49,498	100%

== Budapest ==
=== District 1 ===
parliamentary election – Budapest 1
Party	Candidate	Votes	%
United for Hungary	Antal Csárdi	21,778	48.47%
Fidesz–KDNP	László Böröcz	19,144	42.60%
MKKP	Antal Hotz	1,975	4.40%
Mi Hazánk	István Szikora	1,229	2.74%
MEMO	Gergely Murányi	543	1.21%
NÉP	Larion Swierkiewicz	186	0.41%
BS	György Simon	79	0.18%
Total votes		44,934	100%

=== District 2 ===
parliamentary election – Budapest 2
Party	Candidate	Votes	%
United for Hungary	Anna Orosz	27,881	51.94%
Fidesz–KDNP	István Simicskó	21,864	40.73%
Mi Hazánk	Előd Novák	1,653	3.08%
MKKP	Miklós Mendly	1,607	2.99%
MEMO	Gábor Szenes	458	0.85%
NÉP	Piroska Billein	159	0.30%
BS	György Barabás	56	0.10%
Total votes		53,678	100%

=== District 3 ===
parliamentary election – Budapest 3
Party	Candidate	Votes	%
United for Hungary	Miklós Hajnal	25,323	48.42%
Fidesz–KDNP	Balázs Fürjes	21,872	41.82%
MKKP	Gergely Kovács	2,861	5.47%
Mi Hazánk	András Grundtner	1,162	2.22%
Independent	Mária Hajdu	680	1.30%
MEMO	Dávid Jenei	398	0.76%
Total votes		52,297	100%

=== District 4 ===
parliamentary election – Budapest 4
Party	Candidate	Votes	%
United for Hungary	Bence Tordai	29,993	51.89%
Fidesz–KDNP	Csaba Gór	23,468	40.60%
MKKP	Veronika Juhász	2,130	3.69%
Mi Hazánk	Attila Nagy (politician)	1,352	2.34%
MEMO	Diána Horváth	623	1.08%
NÉP	József Láz	235	0.41%
Total votes		57,801	100%

=== District 5 ===
parliamentary election – Budapest 5
Party	Candidate	Votes	%
United for Hungary	Lajos Oláh	20,561	51.39%
Fidesz–KDNP	Balázs Norbert Kovács	15,119	37.79%
MKKP	Roland Terdik	2,228	5.57%
Mi Hazánk	Gyula Popély	1,467	3.67%
MEMO	Gergely Róbert Major	638	1.59%
Total votes		40,013	100%

=== District 6 ===
parliamentary election – Budapest 6
Party	Candidate	Votes	%
United for Hungary	András Jámbor	21,462	48.31%
Fidesz–KDNP	Botond Sára	18,561	41.78%
Mi Hazánk	Dóra Dúró	2,159	4.86%
MKKP	Zsuzsanna Döme	1,933	4.35%
MEMO	Béla Haga	307	0.69%
Total votes		44,422	100%

=== District 7 ===
parliamentary election – Budapest 7
Party	Candidate	Votes	%
United for Hungary	Dezső Hiszékeny	35,248	60.53%
Fidesz–KDNP	Tamás Harrach	17,697	30.39%
MKKP	Márta Aleva	2,445	4.20%
Mi Hazánk	Zsolt Nagy	1,907	3.27%
MEMO	Bajnok Halmi	675	1.16%
NÉP	István Károly Varga	263	0.45%
Total votes		58,235	100%

=== District 8 ===
parliamentary election – Budapest 8
Party	Candidate	Votes	%
United for Hungary	Ákos Hadházy	30,159	54.09%
Fidesz–KDNP	Ádám Borbély	20,373	36.54%
Mi Hazánk	János Czeglédi	2,108	3.78%
MKKP	Regina Rózsa	1,946	3.49%
MEMO	István Janicsák	816	1.46%
NÉP	Norbert Duma	255	0.46%
BS	Lajosné Karacs Lajosné	104	0.19%
Total votes		55,761	100%

=== District 9 ===
parliamentary election – Budapest 9
Party	Candidate	Votes	%
United for Hungary	Gergely Arató	22,990	45.97%
Fidesz–KDNP	Sándor Pap	21,282	42.55%
Mi Hazánk	Csongor Vékony	2,210	4.42%
MKKP	Klára Hankó	1,957	3.91%
MEMO	Lajos Détári	1,100	2.20%
NÉP	Kristóf Demény-Nagy	292	0.58%
BS	Péter Gál	180	0.36%
Total votes		50,011	100%

=== District 10 ===
parliamentary election – Budapest 10
Party	Candidate	Votes	%
United for Hungary	Tímea Szabó	26,051	48.82%
Fidesz–KDNP	Balázs Bús	21,940	41.12%
MKKP	Sándor Budai	1,954	3.66%
Mi Hazánk	Miklós Katona	1,929	3.61%
MEMO	Imre Poteczki	826	1.55%
VD	László Péter Rózsa	365	0.68%
NÉP	Anita Müller	296	0.55%
Total votes		53,361	100%

=== District 11 ===
parliamentary election – Budapest 11
Party	Candidate	Votes	%
United for Hungary	László Varju	28,195	50.82%
Fidesz–KDNP	Zsolt Wintermantel	21,684	39.08%
Mi Hazánk	Tibor Pajor	2,480	4.47%
MKKP	Miklós Paizs	1,949	3.51%
MEMO	István Endrédi	900	1.62%
NÉP	József Szőnyi	277	0.50%
Total votes		55,485	100%

=== District 12 ===
parliamentary election – Budapest 12
Party	Candidate	Votes	%
United for Hungary	Balázs Barkóczi	23,397	45.11%
Fidesz–KDNP	Gábor Pintér	21,987	42.39%
Mi Hazánk	András Takács	2,559	4.93%
MKKP	Alex Steimetz	2,282	4.40%
MEMO	Norbert Ádám Szabó	1,131	2.18%
NÉP	Claudia Huszár	347	0.67%
BS	Dávid Gallai	161	0.31%
Total votes		51,864	100%

=== District 13 ===
parliamentary election – Budapest 13
Party	Candidate	Votes	%
United for Hungary	Zoltán Vajda	25,080	45.46%
Fidesz–KDNP	Kristóf Szatmáry	24,612	44.61%
Mi Hazánk	Éva Nagyné Hollósi	1,833	3.32%
MKKP	Bence Bojti	1,749	3.17%
Independent	Viktor Schaffer	666	1.21%
MEMO	Sándor Stelli-Kis	610	1.11%
BS	Tibor Szanyi	393	0.71%
NÉP	László Zsidró	229	0.42%
Total votes		55,172	100%

=== District 14 ===
parliamentary election – Budapest 14
Party	Candidate	Votes	%
Fidesz–KDNP	Mónika Dunai	25,114	44.66%
United for Hungary	György Szilágyi	24,733	43.98%
Mi Hazánk	László Fazekas	2,875	5.11%
MKKP	Richárd Szin	2,172	3.86%
MEMO	Gergely Hajmási	875	1.56%
NÉP	László Tomasovszki	339	0.60%
BS	András Zollai	132	0.23%
Total votes		56,240	100%

=== District 15 ===
parliamentary election – Budapest 15
Party	Candidate	Votes	%
United for Hungary	Ágnes Kunhalmi	25,946	44.60%
Fidesz–KDNP	István Zoltán Lévai	25,166	43.26%
Mi Hazánk	Árvai Csaba	2,559	4.40%
MKKP	Márton Szokor	1,860	3.20%
Independent	István Juhász	1,678	2.88%
MEMO	Tünde Tabi	679	1.17%
NÉP	Zoltán Sinka	291	0.50%
Total votes		58,179	100%

=== District 16 ===
parliamentary election – Budapest 16
Party	Candidate	Votes	%
United for Hungary	István Hiller	22,856	46.35%
Fidesz–KDNP	Gyula Földesi	20,880	42.34%
Mi Hazánk	Pál Hrivnák	2,410	4.89%
MKKP	Szabolcs Szentesi	2,039	4.13%
MEMO	Elemér Horváth	629	1.28%
NÉP	Veronika Garai	367	0.74%
BS	Sándor Székely	133	0.27%
Total votes		49,314	100%

=== District 17 ===
parliamentary election – Budapest 17
Party	Candidate	Votes	%
United for Hungary	Szabolcs Szabó	24,595	46.49%
Fidesz–KDNP	Szilárd Németh	22,055	41.69%
Mi Hazánk	Attila Kovács	3,035	5.74%
MKKP	Cséke Csizmadia	1,787	3.38%
MEMO	Sándor Koller	905	1.71%
NÉP	Arnoldné Járó	291	0.74%
BS	Éva Pál	238	0.45%
Total votes		52,906	100%

=== District 18 ===
parliamentary election – Budapest 18
Party	Candidate	Votes	%
United for Hungary	Endre Tóth	28,964	48.47%
Fidesz–KDNP	Zsolt Németh	25,120	42.03%
Mi Hazánk	Tamás Esze	2,531	4.24%
MKKP	Attila Ozsvát	2,019	3.38%
MEMO	Zoltán Papp	613	1.03%
NÉP	Gábor Dániel Szabó	425	0.71%
BS	Richárd Schlenk	89	0.15%
Total votes		49,314	100%

== Csongrád-Csanád County ==
=== District 1 ===
parliamentary election – Csongrád-Csanád 1
Party	Candidate	Votes	%
United for Hungary	Sándor Szabó	27,433	49.51%
Fidesz–KDNP	Csaba Bartók	15,159	36.37%
Mi Hazánk	Julianna Lekó	3,162	5.70%
MKKP	Ferenc Nagy	2,163	3.90%
Independent	Bálint Szabó	1,123	2.03%
MEMO	Annamária Veszelinov	1,006	1.81%
NÉP	Gabriella Ágnes Budai	376	0.68%
Total votes		55,172	100%

=== District 2 ===
parliamentary election – Csongrád-Csanád 2
Party	Candidate	Votes	%
Fidesz–KDNP	Béla Mihálffy	27,516	45.29%
United for Hungary	Edvin Mihálik	24,443	40.23%
Mi Hazánk	László Toroczkai	5,768	9.49%
MKKP	Csanád Tóth-Benedek	1,845	3.04%
MEMO	Benjamin Norbert Gonda	734	1.21%
NÉP	Marian Lévainé Kovács	453	0.75%
Total votes		60,759	100%

=== District 3 ===
parliamentary election – Csongrád-Csanád 3
Party	Candidate	Votes	%
Fidesz–KDNP	Sándor Farkas	29,582	54.74%
United for Hungary	Ildikó Szűcs	16,947	31.36%
Mi Hazánk	Zsolt Laczko	5,313	9.83%
Independent	Máté Köröndi	1,443	2.67%
MEMO	Hajnalka Üveges	755	1.40%
Total votes		54,040	100%

=== District 4 ===
parliamentary election – Csongrád-Csanád 4
Party	Candidate	Votes	%
Fidesz–KDNP	János Lázár	28,753	51.77%
United for Hungary	Péter Márki-Zay	22,328	40.20%
Mi Hazánk	Csaba Levente Veres	2,938	5.29%
MKKP	József Kis	944	1.70%
MEMO	Zoltán Szabó	463	0.83%
BS	István Kovács	119	0.21%
Total votes		55,545	100%

== Fejér County ==
=== District 1 ===
parliamentary election – Fejér 1
Party	Candidate	Votes	%
Fidesz–KDNP	Tamás Vargha	21,546	47.43%
United for Hungary	Roland Márton	18,994	41.81%
Mi Hazánk	Annamária Végh	2,337	5.14%
MKKP	Roland Fenekes	1,637	3.60%
MEMO	Benedek Balogh	591	1.30%
NÉP	Imre Göde	319	0.70%
Total votes		45,818	100%

=== District 2 ===
parliamentary election – Fejér 2
Party	Candidate	Votes	%
Fidesz–KDNP	Gábor Törő	28,380	56.01%
United for Hungary	Attila Fazekas	15,219	30.04%
Mi Hazánk	Roland Schmidt	4,153	8.20%
MKKP	Eszter Varga	1,860	3.67%
NÉP	Márta Fogarasi	489	0.97%
MEMO	Mária Rozália Huszti	449	0.89%
BS	Péter Veres	116	0.23%
Total votes		51,174	100%

=== District 3 ===
parliamentary election – Fejér 3
Party	Candidate	Votes	%
Fidesz–KDNP	Zoltán Telessy	32,520	57.34%
United for Hungary	Péter Balázs	18,092	31.90%
Mi Hazánk	Pál Hegedüs	3,168	5.59%
MKKP	László Mészáros	1,944	3.43%
MEMO	Tamás Könyves	854	1.51%
BS	István Tamás Fléger	137	0.24%
Total votes		57,294	100%

=== District 4 ===
parliamentary election – Fejér 4
Party	Candidate	Votes	%
Fidesz–KDNP	Lajos Mészáros	20,562	46.17%
United for Hungary	Gergely Kálló	19,509	43.81%
Mi Hazánk	Péter Badó	2,219	4.98%
MKKP	Anita Pozsgai	1,194	2.68%
MEMO	Henrik Hermann	669	1.50%
NÉP	János Kohl	286	0.64%
BS	Zsolt Fehérvári István	97	0.22%
Total votes		45,053	100%

=== District 5 ===
parliamentary election – Fejér 5
Party	Candidate	Votes	%
Fidesz–KDNP	Gábor Varga	27,629	64.55%
United for Hungary	Éva Kertész	10,441	24.39%
Mi Hazánk	Lajos Gieber	3,019	7.05%
MKKP	Gábor Spala	969	2.26%
NÉP	János Kovács Ferenc	457	1.07%
MEMO	Krisztián Lakatos	289	0.68%
Total votes		43,258	100%

== Győr-Moson-Sopron County ==
=== District 1 ===
parliamentary election – Győr-Moson-Sopron 1
Party	Candidate	Votes	%
Fidesz–KDNP	Róbert Balázs Simon	24,182	50.44%
United for Hungary	Jancsó Zita	18,356	38.29%
Mi Hazánk	Csaba Bálint	2,631	5.49%
MKKP	Balázs Kovács	1,692	3.53%
MEMO	Róbert Szilágyi	1,079	2.25%
Total votes		48,384	100%

=== District 2 ===
parliamentary election – Győr-Moson-Sopron 2
Party	Candidate	Votes	%
Fidesz–KDNP	Ákos Kara	31,661	60.13%
United for Hungary	László Gasztonyi	16,517	31.37%
Mi Hazánk	Róbert Szabó	3,214	6.10%
MEMO	Norbert Szemes	861	1.64%
NÉP	Gábor Szöllősi	402	0.76%
Total votes		53,230	100%

=== District 3 ===
parliamentary election – Győr-Moson-Sopron 3
Party	Candidate	Votes	%
Fidesz–KDNP	Alpár Gyopáros	35,119	71.22%
United for Hungary	Ildikó Kovácsné Varga	10,592	21.48%
Mi Hazánk	Gergő Ferencz	2,759	5.67%
MEMO	Donát Tamás Pércsi	650	1.32%
Liberals	Viktor Szabadai	152	0.31%
Total votes		49,878	100%

=== District 4 ===
parliamentary election – Győr-Moson-Sopron 4
Party	Candidate	Votes	%
Fidesz–KDNP	Attila Barcza	32,394	57.35%
United for Hungary	Koloman Brenner	18,786	33.26%
Mi Hazánk	Gábor Horváth	4,112	7.28%
MEMO	Zoltán Sala	1,190	2.11%
Total votes		57,195	100%

=== District 5 ===
parliamentary election – Győr-Moson-Sopron 5
Party	Candidate	Votes	%
Fidesz–KDNP	István Nagy	32,549	59.23%
United for Hungary	Zoltán Magyar	16,746	30.47%
Mi Hazánk	Miklós Ferenc Takács	2,807	5.11%
MKKP	András Földesi	1,663	3.03%
MEMO	János Mácsik	729	1.33%
NÉP	Renáta Varga	463	0.84%
Total votes		55,646	100%

== Hajdú-Bihar County ==
=== District 1 ===
parliamentary election – Hajdú-Bihar 1
Party	Candidate	Votes	%
Fidesz–KDNP	Lajos Kósa	23,385	48.95%
United for Hungary	Zoltán Varga	18,994	39.75%
Mi Hazánk	Zsuzsanna Kuti	2,912	6,09%
MKKP	Csaba Pető	1,681	3,52%
MEMO	Zoltán Hermann	678	1.42%
BS	Marietta Németh	128	0.27%
Total votes		47,778	100%

=== District 2 ===
parliamentary election – Hajdú-Bihar 2
Party	Candidate	Votes	%
Fidesz–KDNP	László Pósán	27,111	55.61%
United for Hungary	László Mándi	19,560	40.12%
NÉP	Szilvia Morán-Mihucza	1,498	3.07%
BS	Andrea Huszti	579	1.19%
Total votes		48,748	100%

=== District 3 ===
parliamentary election – Hajdú-Bihar 3
Party	Candidate	Votes	%
Fidesz–KDNP	László Tasó	31,266	63.51%
United for Hungary	Gergő Salamon	13,627	27.68%
Mi Hazánk	Máté Hunyadi	3,075	6.25%
MEMO	Attila Hornyák	602	1.22%
NÉP	László Dobránszki	358	0.73%
MSZDDSZ	Viola Julianna Rózsás	177	0.36%
BS	István Káposznyák	128	0.26%
Total votes		49,233	100%

=== District 4 ===
parliamentary election – Hajdú-Bihar 4
Party	Candidate	Votes	%
Fidesz–KDNP	István Vitányi	25,407	61.66%
United for Hungary	László Szántai	9,483	23.01%
Independent	József Mezei	3,399	8.25%
Mi Hazánk	Lajos Somi	2,270	5.51%
MEMO	András Zelenák	283	0.69%
NÉP	Antal Farkas	272	0.66%
BS	László Kóti	92	0.22%
Total votes		41,206	100%

=== District 5 ===
parliamentary election – Hajdú-Bihar 5
Party	Candidate	Votes	%
Fidesz–KDNP	Sándor Bodó	26,982	60.61%
United for Hungary	László Kiss	13,529	30.39%
Mi Hazánk	Sándor Tóth	3,159	7.10%
MEMO	Ferencz Tóth	410	0.92%
NÉP	Levente István Czifra	332	0.75%
BS	Sándor Sipos	102	0.23%
Total votes		44,514	100%

=== District 6 ===
parliamentary election – Hajdú-Bihar 6
Party	Candidate	Votes	%
Fidesz–KDNP	István Tiba	26,062	58.19%
United for Hungary	Péter Hegedüs	13,929	31.10%
Mi Hazánk	Zoltán Nagy	3,504	7.82%
MEMO	László Andorkó	641	1.43%
NÉP	Erzsébet Vargáné Fülöp	468	1.04%
BS	László Dobány	187	0.42%
Total votes		44,791	100%

== Heves County ==
=== District 1 ===
parliamentary election – Heves 1
Party	Candidate	Votes	%
Fidesz–KDNP	Dr. Gábor Pajtók	29,703	52.19%
United for Hungary	Mátyás Berecz	20,772	36.50%
Mi Hazánk	Dr. Ákos Pápai	3,945	6.93%
MKKP	Veronika Vass	1,400	2.46%
MEMO	Sándor Béla Kacsó	634	1.11%
NÉP	Ágnes Nagy	454	0.80%
Total votes		56,908	100%

=== District 2 ===
parliamentary election – Heves 2
Party	Candidate	Votes	%
Fidesz–KDNP	László Horváth	28,878	54.91%
United for Hungary	Róbert Dudás	19,148	36.41%
Mi Hazánk	Dr. Roland Hajdara	3,141	5.97%
Independent	Zsolt Érsek	915	1.74%
MEMO	Richárd Barna	505	0.96%
Total votes		53,270	100%

=== District 3 ===
parliamentary election – Heves 3
Party	Candidate	Votes	%
Fidesz–KDNP	Zsolt Szabó	30,863	59.06%
United for Hungary	Lajos Kórozs	15,450	29.56%
Mi Hazánk	Ádám Gonda	4,746	9.08%
MEMO	Gergő Antal	952	1.82%
BS	Istvánné Kovács	248	0.47%
Total votes		53,094	100%

== Jász-Nagykun-Szolnok County ==
=== District 1 ===
parliamentary election – Jász-Nagykun-Szolnok 1
Party	Candidate	Votes	%
Fidesz–KDNP	Mária Kállai	24,972	46.91%
United for Hungary	Pál Sziráki	20,864	39.20%
Mi Hazánk	Béla Vincze	3,921	7.37%
MKKP	Péter Viczán	1,545	2.90%
MEMO	Erika Korpai	650	1.22%
PV	Attila Csikós	521	0.98%
NÉP	Mónika Varga	460	0.86%
BS	Attila Németh	296	0.56%
Total votes		53,229	100%

=== District 2 ===
parliamentary election – Jász-Nagykun-Szolnok 2
Party	Candidate	Votes	%
Fidesz–KDNP	János Pócs	28,215	59.81%
United for Hungary	Ottó Kertész	15,915	33.74%
Mi Hazánk	Gyula Dobrán	2,116	4.49%
MEMO	Nándor Oszvald	551	1.17%
NÉP	György Magda	265	0.56%
BS	Imréné Balogh	111	0.24%
Total votes		47,173	100%

=== District 3 ===
parliamentary election – Jász-Nagykun-Szolnok 3
Party	Candidate	Votes	%
Fidesz–KDNP	Sándor F. Kovács	29,923	64.14%
United for Hungary	László György Lukács	13,614	29.18%
Mi Hazánk	Róbert Somlay	2,426	5.20%
MEMO	Bálint Ferenc Halmi	468	1.00%
BS	József Nagy	221	0.47%
Total votes		46,652	100%

=== District 4 ===
parliamentary election – Jász-Nagykun-Szolnok 4
Party	Candidate	Votes	%
Fidesz–KDNP	Zsolt Herczeg	23,667	51.50%
United for Hungary	Tamás Csányi	17,047	37.10%
Mi Hazánk	Bettina Szabó	3,756	8.17%
MKKP	Attila Farkas	936	2.04%
NÉP	János Szegény	399	0.87%
BS	Mihály Bencsik	148	0.32%
Total votes		45,953	100%

== Komárom-Esztergom County ==
=== District 1 ===
parliamentary election – Komárom-Esztergom 1
Party	Candidate	Votes	%
Fidesz–KDNP	János Bencsik	26,240	48.18%
United for Hungary	Erik Konczer	22,417	41.16%
Mi Hazánk	Bánk Boda	2,856	5.24%
MKKP	Dávid Börzsei	1,429	2.62%
MEMO	Judit Popovics	891	1.64%
NÉP	Tibor Keindl	372	0.68%
BS	Tibor Jánoki	252	0.46%
Total votes		54,457	100%

=== District 2 ===
parliamentary election – Komárom-Esztergom 2
Party	Candidate	Votes	%
Fidesz–KDNP	Gábor Erős	27,795	49.96%
United for Hungary	Tibor Nunkovics	21,587	38.80%
Mi Hazánk	János Lantos	3,047	5.48%
MKKP	Zoltán Stipits	1,463	2.63%
Independent	Ferenc Deák	983	1.77%
NÉP	Tamás Greiner	765	1.37%
Total votes		55,640	100%

=== District 3 ===
parliamentary election – Komárom-Esztergom 3
Party	Candidate	Votes	%
Fidesz–KDNP	Judit Bertalan	30,965	55.10%
United for Hungary	Andrea Nemes	18,605	33.11%
Mi Hazánk	Barnabás Ábrahám	3,728	6.63%
MKKP	Máté Gombos	1,479	2.63%
MEMO	Gábor Füzi	1,000	1.78%
NÉP	Ferenc Matus	422	0.75%
Total votes		56,199	100%

== Nógrád County ==
=== District 1 ===
parliamentary election – Nógrád 1
Party	Candidate	Votes	%
Fidesz–KDNP	Zsolt Becsó	26,023	53.85%
United for Hungary	Beatrix Godó	17,467	36.15%
Mi Hazánk	László Musztács	2,960	6.13%
MKKP	Mihály Tamás Pauló	879	1.82%
MEMO	Péter Kecskés	403	0.83%
NÉP	Zsolt Pintér	350	0.72%
BS	Norbert Krizs	241	0.50%
Total votes		48,323	100%

=== District 2 ===
parliamentary election – Nógrád 2
Party	Candidate	Votes	%
Fidesz–KDNP	Mihály Balla	31,921	60.08%
United for Hungary	Szilárd Gyenes	12,722	23.95%
Mi Hazánk	Dávid Dócs	6,315	11.89%
MKKP	Renáta Márton	1,097	2.06%
MEMO	László Sopotnik	471	0.89%
BS	Zsuzsanna Frankfurter	339	0.64%
NÉP	Zoltán Domokos	265	0.50%
Total votes		53,130	100%

== Pest County ==
=== District 1 ===
parliamentary election – Pest 1
Party	Candidate	Votes	%
Fidesz–KDNP	András Aradszki	29,597	45.38%
United for Hungary	Anett Bősz	28,076	43.05%
Mi Hazánk	Károly Csott	3,220	4.94%
MKKP	Kitti Ignáth	2,067	3.17%
Independent	Éva Asztalos	1,527	2.34%
MEMO	Valentin Váradi	729	1.12%
Total votes		65,216	100%

=== District 2 ===
parliamentary election – Pest 2
Party	Candidate	Votes	%
Fidesz–KDNP	Tamás Menczer	34,810	46.77%
United for Hungary	Bernadett Szél	33,432	44.92%
Mi Hazánk	József György	2,700	3.63%
MKKP	Edina Jakab	2,399	3.22%
MEMO	Dániel László Bogó	779	1.05%
NÉP	Erzsébet Kerekes	302	0.41%
Total votes		74,422	100%

=== District 3 ===
parliamentary election – Pest 3
Party	Candidate	Votes	%
Fidesz–KDNP	Eszter Vitályos	36,877	51.94%
United for Hungary	György Buzinkay	26,540	37.38%
Mi Hazánk	Béla Pál	3,051	4.30%
MKKP	Miklós Kövesdi	3,035	4.27%
MEMO	Béla Polocsányi	819	1.15%
NÉP	Csaba Tihanyi	391	0.55%
BS	Ferenc Pálmai	284	0.40%
Total votes		70,997	100%

=== District 4 ===
parliamentary election – Pest 4
Party	Candidate	Votes	%
Fidesz–KDNP	Bence Rétvári	30,747	55.46%
United for Hungary	Gergely Inotay	18,759	33.83%
Mi Hazánk	Jenő Páli	3,242	5.85%
MKKP	Gergely Korga	1,783	3.22%
MEMO	Sarantis Mantzourakis	426	0.77%
NÉP	László Pintér	384	0.69%
BS	József Ferenc Simon	102	0.18%
Total votes		55,443	100%

=== District 5 ===
parliamentary election – Pest 5
Party	Candidate	Votes	%
Fidesz–KDNP	Bence Tuzson	34,390	46.30%
United for Hungary	Dávid Dorosz	31,228	42.04%
Mi Hazánk	Mátyás Kovács	3,499	4.71%
MKKP	Zoltán Bürger	2,801	3.77%
MEMO	Roxána Kovács	1,274	1.72%
MEMO	László Lőrincz	624	0.84%
NÉP	Gábor Szuchányi	462	0.62%
Total votes		74,278	100%

=== District 6 ===
parliamentary election – Pest 6
Party	Candidate	Votes	%
Fidesz–KDNP	László Vécsey	33,188	49.05%
United for Hungary	Krisztina Hohn	25,826	38.17%
Mi Hazánk	Géza Halász	3,911	5.78%
MKKP	Gábor Bősze	2,290	3.38%
MEMO	Sándor Zoltán Kopka	1,178	1.74%
Independent	Tamás Antal	880	1.30%
NÉP	László Szibilla	385	0.57%
Total votes		67,658	100%

=== District 7 ===
parliamentary election – Pest 7
Party	Candidate	Votes	%
Fidesz–KDNP	Lajos Szűcs	31,623	49.22%
United for Hungary	Péter Fricsovszky-Tóth	23,449	36.50%
Mi Hazánk	Klára Szabóné Papp	4,219	6.57%
MKKP	Petra Iván	2,915	4.54%
MEMO	István Balogh	1,484	2.31%
NÉP	Dániel Bocz	558	0.87%
Total votes		64,248	100%

=== District 8 ===
parliamentary election – Pest 8
Party	Candidate	Votes	%
Fidesz–KDNP	Zoltán Bóna	29,584	45.55%
United for Hungary	Teodóra Jószai	27,701	42.65%
Mi Hazánk	Kornél Levente Botló	3,657	5.63%
MKKP	Bernadett Zseli	2,070	3.19%
MEMO	János Krisztián Kámány	806	1.24%
Independent	Gyula Dorogi	751	1.16%
NÉP	György János Prohászka	373	0.57%
Total votes		64,942	100%

=== District 9 ===
parliamentary election – Pest 9
Party	Candidate	Votes	%
Fidesz–KDNP	György Czerván	29,632	60.22%
United for Hungary	Erzsébet Schmuck	14,096	28.65%
Mi Hazánk	Péter László	3,259	6.62%
MKKP	Kornél Kiss	1,236	2.51%
MEMO	Zoltán Zsolt Vári	589	1.20%
NÉP	Boglárka Bezzeg	397	0.81%
Total votes		49,209	100%

=== District 10 ===
parliamentary election – Pest 10
Party	Candidate	Votes	%
Fidesz–KDNP	Tibor Pogácsás	30,973	59.71%
United for Hungary	Rebeka Szabó	14,797	28.52%
Mi Hazánk	Attila László	3,901	7.52%
MKKP	Róbert Kőhegyi	1,528	2.95%
MEMO	Zita Zrubka	677	1.31%
Total votes		51,876	100%

=== District 11 ===
parliamentary election – Pest 11
Party	Candidate	Votes	%
Fidesz–KDNP	Károly Pánczél	35,513	56.81%
United for Hungary	Ágota Jánosi-Lesi	19,824	31.71%
Mi Hazánk	Antal Bobrovácz	3,769	6.03%
MKKP	Norbert Ferancz	1,807	2.89%
MEMO	László Szabó	885	1.42%
NÉP	Dániel Mihály	550	0.88%
BS	László Fekete	169	0.27%
Total votes		62,517	100%

=== District 12 ===
parliamentary election – Pest 12
Party	Candidate	Votes	%
Fidesz–KDNP	László Földi	28,244	59.11%
United for Hungary	Nándor Zágráb	13,696	28.66%
Mi Hazánk	Barna Bartha	3,693	7.73%
MKKP	Viktor Kis	1,239	2.59%
MEMO	Éva Ilona Pásztor	506	1.06%
NÉP	István Andriska	406	0.85%
Total votes		47,784	100%

== Somogy County ==
=== District 1 ===
parliamentary election – Somogy 1 (Kaposvár)
Party	Candidate	Votes	%
Fidesz–KDNP	Attila Gelencsér	20,062	47.63%
United for Hungary	István Varga	14,670	34.83%
Mi Hazánk	Csaba Kelemen	2,490	5.91%
Independent	István Varga	1,849	4.39%
MKKP	Zsófia Teleki-Molnár	983	2.33%
Independent	Norbert József Nadrai	830	1.97%
MEMO	Gergő Hauser	755	1.79%
Independent	Ákos Horváth	369	0.88%
BS	Tamás Varga	110	0.26%
Total votes		42,118	100%

=== District 2 ===
parliamentary election – Somogy 2 (Barcs)
Party	Candidate	Votes	%
Fidesz–KDNP	László Szászfalvi	21,571	57.86%
United for Hungary	Balázs Ander	13,855	37.16%
Mi Hazánk	Gyöngyi Halászné Hunyadi	1,525	4.09%
MEMO	Sándor Palkó	332	0.89%
Total votes		37,283	100%

=== District 3 ===
parliamentary election – Somogy 3 (Marcali)
Party	Candidate	Votes	%
Fidesz–KDNP	József Attila Móring	24,171	57.92%
United for Hungary	Ádám Steinmetz	14,776	35.41%
Mi Hazánk	Tamás Jozó	2,408	5.77%
MEMO	Csaba Kazai	374	0.90%
Total votes		41,729	100%

=== District 4 ===
parliamentary election – Somogy 4 (Siófok)
Party	Candidate	Votes	%
Fidesz–KDNP	Mihály Witzmann	26,834	59.94%
United for Hungary	Anita Potocskáné Kőrösi	16,010	35.76%
MEMO	Patrik Burda	835	1.87%
NÉP	Rita Sümegi	751	1.68%
BS	László Knoch	341	0.76%
Total votes		44,771	100%

== Szabolcs-Szatmár-Bereg County ==
=== District 1 ===
parliamentary election – Szabolcs-Szatmár-Bereg 1 (Nyíregyháza)
Party	Candidate	Votes	%
Fidesz–KDNP	Tünde Szabó	23,254	44.92%
United for Hungary	Máté Lengyel	21,806	42.12%
Mi Hazánk	Attila Horváth	2,718	5.25%
Independent	László Nagy	1,124	2.17%
MKKP	Zsolt Balázs	1,075	2.08%
MEMO	László Helmeczy	1,023	1.98%
NÉP	György Gődény	772	1.49%
Total votes		51,772	100%

=== District 2 ===
parliamentary election – Szabolcs-Szatmár-Bereg 2 (Nyíregyháza)
Party	Candidate	Votes	%
Fidesz–KDNP	Győző Vinnai	26,277	58.13%
United for Hungary	Gábor Aranyos	14,759	32.65%
Mi Hazánk	Koppány Zoltán Kovács	2,823	6.25%
Independent	Melinda Kanalas	476	1.05%
MEMO	Ferenc Kardos	448	0.99%
NÉP	László Gurcsák	417	0.92%
Total votes		45,200	100%

=== District 3 ===
parliamentary election – Szabolcs-Szatmár-Bereg 3 (Kisvárda)
Party	Candidate	Votes	%
Fidesz–KDNP	Miklós Seszták	31,946	65.31%
United for Hungary	Viktor Tóth	12,781	26.13%
Mi Hazánk	János Perdiák	2,869	5.87%
MEMO	Balázs Dzsubák	770	1.57%
NÉP	Mária Györkösné Orbán	351	0.72%
BS	Péter Pál Tóth	197	0.40%
Total votes		48,914	100%

=== District 4 ===
parliamentary election – Szabolcs-Szatmár-Bereg 4 (Vásárosnamény)
Party	Candidate	Votes	%
Fidesz–KDNP	Attila Tilki	31,523	68.71%
United for Hungary	Mónika Sápi	11,404	24.86%
Mi Hazánk	Mihály Bertics	2,159	4.71%
NÉP	Mária Szabó	319	0.70%
MEMO	Zsolt Kantuly	302	0.66%
IMA	Szilárd Király	172	0.37%
Total votes		45,879	100%

=== District 5 ===
parliamentary election – Szabolcs-Szatmár-Bereg 5 (Mátészalka)
Party	Candidate	Votes	%
Fidesz–KDNP	Sándor Kovács	29,647	64.79%
United for Hungary	István Földi	11,250	24.58%
Mi Hazánk	István Apáti	4,185	9.15%
MEMO	Alex Roland	347	0.76%
NÉP	Csaba Attila Nagy	332	0.73%
Total votes		45,761	100%

=== District 6 ===
parliamentary election – Szabolcs-Szatmár-Bereg 6 (Nyírbátor)
Party	Candidate	Votes	%
Fidesz–KDNP	Miklós Simon	29,875	65.69%
United for Hungary	Viktor Tóth	12,027	26.45%
Mi Hazánk	Lajos Szathmári	2,252	4.95%
MKKP	Csaba Polyák	558	1.23%
MEMO	Zoltán Czakó	386	0.85%
NÉP	Zsolt Koroknai	381	0.84%
Total votes		45,479	100%

== Tolna County ==
=== District 1 ===
parliamentary election – Tolna 1
Party	Candidate	Votes	%
Fidesz–KDNP	István Horváth	22,642	55.51%
United for Hungary	Tamás Harangozó	14,279	35.00%
Mi Hazánk	Tamás Papp	2,361	5.79%
MKKP	László Farkas	1,042	2.55%
MEMO	Ferenc Hajdu	383	0.94%
BS	Márton Kercsó	85	0.21%
Total votes		40,792	100%

=== District 2 ===
parliamentary election – Tolna 2
Party	Candidate	Votes	%
Fidesz–KDNP	Árpád Potápi	24,362	62.44%
United for Hungary	Loránd Szabó	10,536	27.00%
Mi Hazánk	Gábor Tobak	2,942	7.54%
NÉP	Gábor Bea	601	1.54%
MEMO	Attila Kőmüves	576	1.48%
Total votes		39,017	100%

=== District 3 ===
parliamentary election – Tolna 3
Party	Candidate	Votes	%
Fidesz–KDNP	János Süli	25,102	62.98%
United for Hungary	János Bencze	11,107	27.87%
Mi Hazánk	Tibor Árvai	2,696	6.76%
NÉP	Halász Gergely	518	1.30%
MEMO	Péter Laczkó	433	1.09%
Total votes		39,856	100%

== Vas County ==
=== District 1 ===
parliamentary election – Vas 1
Party	Candidate	Votes	%
Fidesz–KDNP	Csaba Hende	25,792	49.95%
United for Hungary	Csaba Czeglédy	20,771	40.23%
Mi Hazánk	István Vadon	2,421	4.69%
MKKP	Dávid Nagy	1,585	3.07%
MEMO	Tamás Tömböly	641	1.03%
NÉP	Éva Horváth	467	0.90%
BS	Máté Hegedűs	71	0.14%
Total votes		51,637	100%

=== District 2 ===
parliamentary election – Vas 2
Party	Candidate	Votes	%
Fidesz–KDNP	Péter Ágh	32,226	64.38%
United for Hungary	Kornél Hencz	13,026	26.02%
Mi Hazánk	József Giczy	2,933	5.86%
MKKP	Tamás Zakota	1,137	2.27%
MEMO	Sándor Horváth	441	0.88%
NÉP	Zoltán Rutkai	294	0.59%
Total votes		50,057	100%

=== District 3 ===
parliamentary election – Vas 3
Party	Candidate	Votes	%
Fidesz–KDNP	Zsolt Németh	31,938	66.40%
United for Hungary	Tibor Bana	12,874	26.76%
Mi Hazánk	Csaba Németi	2,676	5.56%
MEMO	Dávid Dávid	613	1.27%
Total votes		48,101	100%

== Veszprém County ==
=== District 1 ===
parliamentary election – Veszprém 1
Party	Candidate	Votes	%
Fidesz–KDNP	Péter Ovádi	26,119	50.48%
United for Hungary	Balázs Csonka	20,301	39.24%
Mi Hazánk	Zsolt Kovacsics	3,231	6.24%
MKKP	Benjamin Vértesi	1,484	2.87%
MEMO	István Simor	604	1.17%
Total votes		51,739	100%

=== District 2 ===
parliamentary election – Veszprem 2
Party	Candidate	Votes	%
Fidesz–KDNP	Károly Kontrát	26,762	50.99%
United for Hungary	Szilveszter Benedek	19,172	36.53%
Mi Hazánk	Attila Kovács	3,582	6.82%
MKKP	Zoltán Kárpáti	1,765	3.36%
MEMO	Ákos Berta	834	1.59%
NÉP	Róbert Dalmadi	372	0.71%
Total votes		52,487	100%

=== District 3 ===
parliamentary election – Veszprém 3
Party	Candidate	Votes	%
Fidesz–KDNP	Tibor Navracsics	23,685	50.70%
United for Hungary	Lajos Rig	20,797	44.51%
MKKP	Balázs Sándor	1,115	2.39%
Independent	Lajos Takács	727	1.56%
MEMO	Lajos Fórizs	396	0.85%
Total votes		46,720	100%

=== District 4 ===
parliamentary election – Veszprém 4
Party	Candidate	Votes	%
Fidesz–KDNP	Zoltán Kovács	29,806	62.70%
United for Hungary	Attila Grőber	13,826	29.09%
Mi Hazánk	Máté Takács	2,702	5.68%
MKKP	Ákos Domján	849	1.79%
MEMO	Gyula Horváth	352	0.74%
Total votes		47,535	100%

== Zala County ==
=== District 1 ===
parliamentary election – Zala 1
Party	Candidate	Votes	%
Fidesz–KDNP	László Vigh	31,178	56.80%
United for Hungary	Irén Csidei	16,987	30.95%
Mi Hazánk	Ferenc Kiss	3,409	6.21%
MKKP	Viktor Csiszár	1,414	2.58%
Independent	Tibor Koltai	694	1.26%
MEMO	Szabolcs Szép	672	1.22%
NÉP	Ádám Marton	455	0.83%
Our Party - IMA	Debóra Virágh	85	0.15%
Total votes		54,894	100%

=== District 2 ===
parliamentary election – Zala 2
Party	Candidate	Votes	%
Fidesz–KDNP	Bálint Nagy	30,734	59.84%
United for Hungary	István Elekes	15,467	30.11%
Mi Hazánk	Gábor Beri	3,185	6.20%
MKKP	Emese Németh	1,363	2.65%
NÉP	József Csendes	611	1.19%
Total votes		51,360	100%

=== District 3 ===
parliamentary election – Zala 3
Party	Candidate	Votes	%
Fidesz–KDNP	Péter Cseresznyés	26,126	52.98%
United for Hungary	Jácint Horváth	18,466	37.45%
Mi Hazánk	Tibor Hokker	2,711	5.50%
MKKP	Dávid Nagy	975	1.98%
NÉP	Balázs Borda	504	1.02%
MEMO	Tamás Barna	410	0.83%
BS	Sándor Székely	122	0.25%
Total votes		49,314	100%

== Sources ==
https://vtr.valasztas.hu/ogy2022/egyeni-valasztokeruletek?tab=county
