= List of members of the National Assembly of Hungary (2022–2026) =

National Assembly of Hungary (2022–2026)

Type
- Type: unicameral
- Houses: National Assembly

History
- Founded: 2 May 2022
- Disbanded: 8 May 2026 (4 years, 6 days)
- Preceded by: Members 2018–2022
- Succeeded by: Members 2026–2030

Leadership
- Speaker: László Kövér, Fidesz

Structure
- Seats: 199
- Political groups: At opening: Government (133): Fidesz (117); KDNP (18); Opposition (63): United for Hungary (56); DK (15); MoMo (10); MSZP (10); Jobbik (10); Párbeszéd (6); LMP (5); MH (6); Ind. (1); Other (1): MNÖÖ (1)

Elections
- Last election: 3 April 2022
- Next election: 12 April 2026

Meeting place
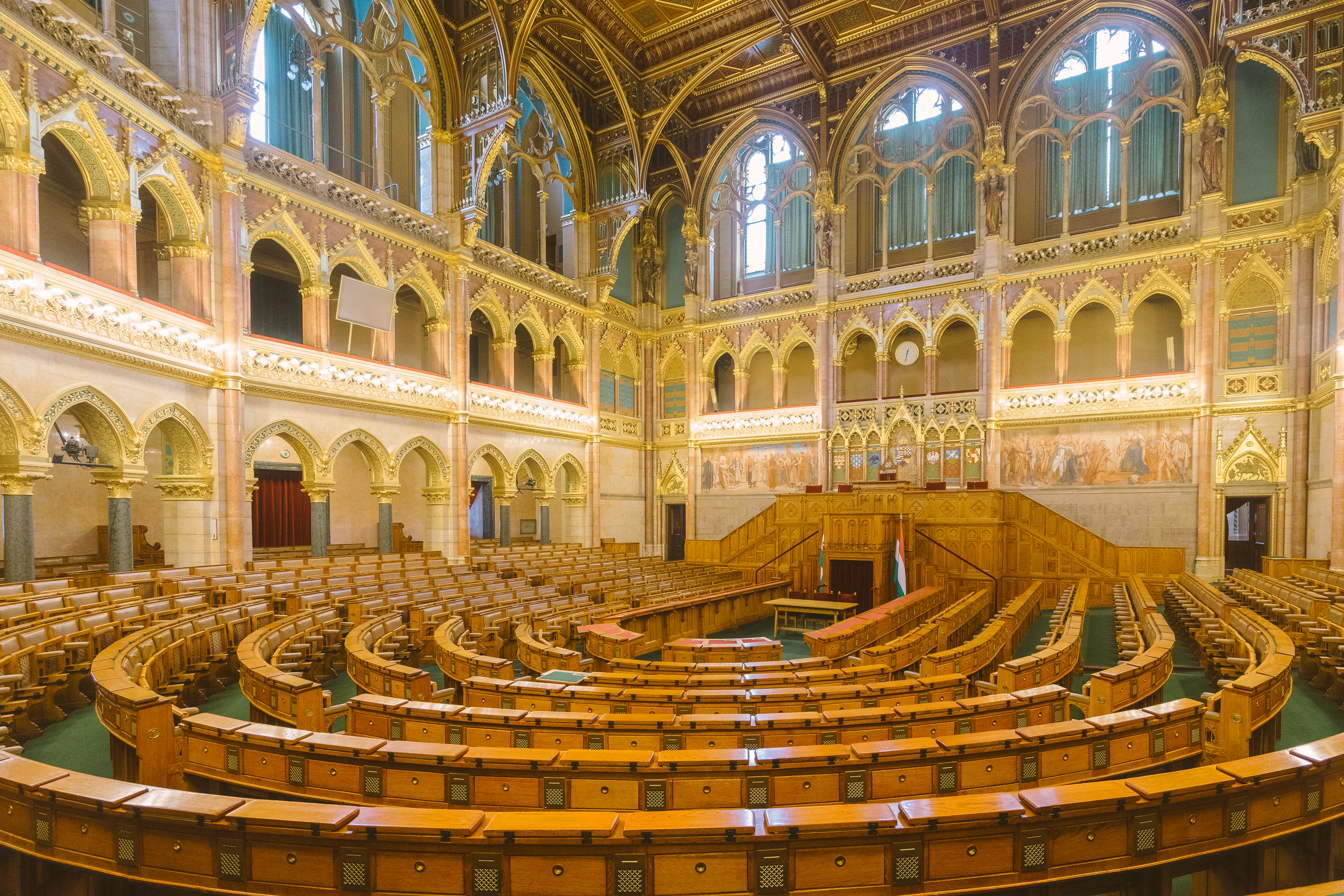
- Hungarian Parliament Building, Budapest

The list of members of the National Assembly of Hungary (2022–2026) is the list of members of the National Assembly – the unicameral legislative body of Hungary – according to the outcome of the Hungarian parliamentary election of 2022.

== Officials ==
=== Speaker ===
- László Kövér (Fidesz)

=== First Officer ===
- Márta Mátrai (Fidesz)

=== Deputy Speaker for Legislation ===
- Csaba Hende (Fidesz)

=== Deputy Speakers ===
- Dóra Dúró (Mi Hazánk)
- István Jakab (Fidesz)
- János Latorcai (KDNP)
- Sándor Lezsák (Fidesz)
- Lajos Oláh (DK)

=== Recorders ===
- András Aradszki (KDNP)
- Bernadett Bakos (LMP)
- Sándor Berki (PM) (from May 17, 2022)
- Dávid Dócs (Mi Hazánk)
- László Földi (KDNP)
- Attila Gelencsér (Fidesz)
- Dezső Hiszékeny (MSZP)
- Mihálffy Béla (KDNP) (from June 14, 2022)
- József Attila Móring (KDNP) (May 2, 2022 – June 14, 2022)
- Sándor Szabó (MSZP)
- Lajos Szűcs (Fidesz)
- István Tiba (Fidesz)
- Győző Vinnai (Fidesz)
- Dániel Z. Kárpát (Jobbik)

=== Father of the Assembly ===
- Béla Turi-Kovács (Fidesz) (age 86 in 2022)
- János Fónagy (Fidesz) (age 80 in 2023)

=== Baby of the Assembly ===
- Miklós Hajnal (Momentum) (age 27 in 2022)

== Parliamentary groups ==

↓
135	56	6	1	1
Fidesz–KDNP	EM	MH	I	MNOÖ

Electoral bloc	Parliamentary group	Members		Group leadership		Status
Electoral bloc	Parliamentary group	At election 3 May 2022	At dissolution 8 May 2026	Leader	Term	Status
Fidesz–KDNP Coalition	Fidesz	117 / 199	116 / 199	Máté Kocsis	2 May 2022 – 8 May 2026	Government
Fidesz–KDNP Coalition	Christian Democratic People's Party (KDNP)	18 / 199	19 / 199	István Simicskó	2 May 2022 – 8 May 2026	Government
United for Hungary (EM)	Democratic Coalition (DK)	15 / 199	15 / 199	Ferenc Gyurcsány	2 May 2022 – 8 May 2026	Opposition
United for Hungary (EM)	Momentum Movement (Momentum)	10 / 199	10 / 199	András Fekete-Győr	2 May 2022 – 19 July 2022	Opposition
United for Hungary (EM)	Momentum Movement (Momentum)	10 / 199	10 / 199	Ferenc Gelencsér	19 July 2022 – 8 May 2026	Opposition
United for Hungary (EM)	Hungarian Socialist Party (MSZP)	10 / 199	10 / 199	Bertalan Tóth	2 May 2022 – 8 May 2026	Opposition
United for Hungary (EM)	Jobbik	10 / 199	8 / 199	Péter Jakab	2 May 2022 – 15 July 2022	Opposition
United for Hungary (EM)	Jobbik	10 / 199	8 / 199	László György Lukács	15 July 2022 – 8 May 2026	Opposition
United for Hungary (EM)	Dialogue for Hungary (Párbeszéd)	6 / 199	6 / 199	Bence Tordai	2 May 2022 – 26 September 2022	Opposition
United for Hungary (EM)	Dialogue for Hungary (Párbeszéd)	6 / 199	6 / 199	Tímea Szabó	26 September 2022 – 8 May 2026	Opposition
United for Hungary (EM)	LMP – Hungary's Green Party (LMP)	5 / 199	5 / 199	Péter Ungár	2 May 2022 – 8 May 2026	Opposition
Our Homeland Movement (Mi Hazánk)		6 / 199	6 / 199	László Toroczkai	2 May 2022 – 8 May 2026	Opposition
Non-attached members		1 / 199	3 / 199	–	–	Opposition
Source: Országgyűlés

== List of Members ==
No.	Name	Date of birth	Party	Constituency	Party-list #	Member since	Ref.
1	Péter Ágh	30 January 1982	Fidesz	Vas County – 2nd constituency		2006	
2	Balázs Ander	11 December 1978	Jobbik		United for Hungary National List (Note: Jobbik, MSZP, DK, LMP, Dialogue, Momentum and some Independent candidate have agreed to run together in an electoral alliance. These parties agreed to run a common national list.), ...	2014	
3	István Apáti	23 March 1978	Mi Hazánk		Our Homeland Movement National List, no. 3	2010	
4	András Aradszki	22 May 1956	KDNP	Pest County – 1st constituency	Fidesz-KDNP National List, no. 154	2010	
5	Gergely Arató	23 November 1968	DK	Budapest – 9th constituency	United for Hungary National List, no. 145	2002–2010, 2018	
6	Bernadett Bakos (Note: Klára Dobrev opted not to take the seat in the Assembly.)	22 June 1992	LMP		United for Hungary National List, no. 50	2022	
7	Péter Balassa	18 March 1975	Jobbik		United for Hungary National List, no. 31	2022	
8	György Balla	11 August 1962	Fidesz		Fidesz-KDNP National List, no. 33	1998	
9	Mihály Balla	21 May 1965	Fidesz	Nógrád County – 2nd constituency	Fidesz-KDNP National List, no. 81	1998	
10	Erik Bánki	26 May 1970	Fidesz		Fidesz-KDNP National List, no. 40	1998–2012, 2014	
11	Gábor Bányai	27 August 1969	Fidesz	Bács-Kiskun County – 5th constituency	Fidesz-KDNP National List, no. 142	2006	
12	Attila Barcza	20 February 1985	Fidesz	Győr-Moson-Sopron County – 4th constituency	Fidesz-KDNP National List, no. 89	2018	
13	Balázs Barkóczi	25 June 1980	DK	Budapest – 12th constituency	United for Hungary National List, no. 153	2022	
14	Mónika Bartos	24 December 1975	Fidesz		Fidesz-KDNP National List, no. 49	2010	
15	Zsolt Becsó	29 October 1967	Fidesz	Nógrád County – 1st constituency	Fidesz-KDNP National List, no. 94	1998	
16	Dávid Bedő	21 December 1992	Momentum		United for Hungary National List, no. 38	2022	
17	János Bencsik	31 July 1965	Fidesz	Komárom-Esztergom County – 1st constituency	Fidesz-KDNP National List, no. 134	1998, 2006	
18	János Bencze	3 March 1973	Jobbik		United for Hungary National List, no. 27	2022	
19	Sándor Berki	1977	Dialogue		United for Hungary National List, no. 15	2022	
20	Sándor Bodó	25 November 1963	Fidesz	Hajdú-Bihar County – 5th constituency	Fidesz-KDNP National List, no. 63	2010	
21	Zoltán Bóna	9 May 1981	Fidesz	Pest County – 8th constituency	Fidesz-KDNP National List, no. 139	2014	
22	Koloman Brenner	28 May 1968	Jobbik		United for Hungary National List, no. 13	2018	
24	Antal Csárdi	8 November 1976	LMP	Budapest – 1st constituency	–	2018	
26	Katalin Csöbör	20 January 1965	Fidesz	Borsod-Abaúj-Zemplén County – 1st constituency	Fidesz-KDNP National List, no. 53	2010	
27	György Czerván	12 July 1959	Fidesz	Pest County – 9th constituency	Fidesz-KDNP National List, no. 105	1998	
28	Judit Czunyi-Bertalan	6 August 1974	Fidesz	Komárom-Esztergom County – 3rd constituency	Fidesz-KDNP National List, no. 57	2010	
29	Béla Dankó	13 May 1969	Fidesz	Békés County – 2nd constituency	Fidesz-KDNP National List, no. 138	2010	
32	Zoltán Demeter	1 December 1963	Fidesz	Borsod-Abaúj-Zemplén County – 4th constituency	Fidesz-KDNP National List, no. 115	2010	
35	Mónika Dunai	21 September 1966	Fidesz	Budapest – 14th constituency	Fidesz-KDNP National List, no. 62	2014	
37	Norbert Erdős	25 November 1972	Fidesz	Békés County – 4th constituency	Fidesz-KDNP National List, no. 158	2002–2014, 2022	
38	Gábor Erős	5 September 1971	Fidesz	Komárom-Esztergom County – 2nd constituency	Fidesz-KDNP National List, no. 126	2022	
39	Sándor F. Kovács	15 July 1966	Fidesz	Jász-Nagykun-Szolnok County – 3rd constituency	Fidesz-KDNP National List, no. 118	2018	
40	Sándor Farkas	18 September 1959	Fidesz	Csongrád-Csanád County – 3rd constituency	Fidesz-KDNP National List, no. 135	1998	
44	Sándor Font	23 November 1960	Fidesz	Bács-Kiskun County – 3rd constituency	Fidesz-KDNP National List, no. 99	1998	
46	László Földi	7 September 1952	KDNP	Pest County – 12th constituency	Fidesz-KDNP National List, no. 93	2010	
50	Attila Gelencsér	14 January 1968	Fidesz	Somogy County – 1st constituency	Fidesz-KDNP National List, no. 97	2010	
53	Alpár Gyopáros	15 May 1978	Fidesz	Győr-Moson-Sopron County – 3rd constituency	Fidesz-KDNP National List, no. 88	2009	
56	Ákos Hadházy	4 March 1974	Independent	Budapest – 8th constituency	–	2014	
57	Miklós Hajnal	4 April 1995	Momentum	Budapest – 3rd constituency	United for Hungary National List, no. 217	2022	
60	János Hargitai	24 April 1958	KDNP	Baranya County – 3rd constituency	Fidesz-KDNP National List, no. 143	1998	
	Csaba Hende	5 February 1960	Fidesz	Vas County – 1st constituency	Fidesz-KDNP National List, no. 51	2002	
65	Tamás Herczeg	16 November 1960	Fidesz	Békés County – 1st constituency	Fidesz-KDNP National List, no. 131	2018	
66	Zsolt Herczeg	22 March 1964	Fidesz	Jász-Nagykun-Szolnok County – 4th constituency	Fidesz-KDNP National List, no. 71	2022	
67	István Hiller	7 May 1964	MSZP	Budapest – 16th constituency	United for Hungary National List, no. 146	2002	
68	Dezső Hiszékeny	22 February 1956	MSZP	Budapest – 7th constituency	–	2014	
70	Péter Hoppál	15 November 1972	Fidesz	Baranya County – 2nd constituency	Fidesz-KDNP National List, no. 148	2009	
71	István Horváth	28 February 1970	Fidesz	Tolna County – 1st constituency	Fidesz-KDNP National List, no. 96	2006	
72	László Horváth	24 April 1962	Fidesz	Heves County – 2nd constituency	Fidesz-KDNP National List, no. 90	1990–1994, 1998–2006, 2010	
73	Richárd Hörcsik	23 December 1955	Fidesz	Borsod-Abaúj-Zemplén County – 5th constituency	Fidesz-KDNP National List, no. 85	1990	
77	András Jámbor	9 August 1986	Dialogue	Budapest – 6th constituency	United for Hungary National List, no. 249	2022	
82	Ákos Kara	21 May 1975	Fidesz	Győr-Moson-Sopron County – 2nd constituency	Fidesz-KDNP National List, no. 130	2010	
84	János Kiss	4 April 1967	Fidesz	Borsod-Abaúj-Zemplén County – 2nd constituency	Fidesz-KDNP National List, no. 79	2022	
73	Zsófia Koncz	1990	Fidesz	Borsod-Abaúj-Zemplén County – 6th constituency	Fidesz-KDNP National List, no. 55	2020	
79	Mária Kállai	5 December 1957	Fidesz	Jász-Nagykun-Szolnok County – 1st constituency	Fidesz-KDNP National List, no. 66	2018	
91	Lajos Kósa	14 March 1964	Fidesz	Hajdú-Bihar County – 1st constituency	Fidesz-KDNP National List, no. 6	1990	
92	József Kovács	15 July 1951	Fidesz	Békés County – 3rd constituency	Fidesz-KDNP National List, no. 106	2010	
99	Sándor Kovács	15 July 1966	Fidesz	Szabolcs-Szatmár-Bereg County; 5th constituency	Fidesz-KDNP National List, no. 67	2014	
98	Ágnes Kunhalmi	31 October 1982	MSZP	Budapest – 15th constituency	United for Hungary National List, no. 140	2014	
101	János Lázár	19 February 1975	Fidesz	Csongrád-Csanád County – 4th constituency	–	2002	
102	Sándor Lezsák	30 October 1949	Fidesz	Bács-Kiskun County – 4th constituency	Fidesz-KDNP National List, no. 11	1994	
106	Tamás Mellár	18 March 1954	Dialogue	Baranya County – 1st constituency	United for Hungary National List, no. 267	2018	
107	Tamás Menczer	19 March 1984	Fidesz	Pest County – 2nd constituency	Fidesz-KDNP National List, no. 141	2022	
108	Lajos Mészáros	7 March 1959	Fidesz	Fejér County – 4th constituency	Fidesz-KDNP National List, no. 103	2022	
109	Béla Mihálffy	26 January 1970	KDNP	Csongrád-Csanád County – 2nd constituency	Fidesz-KDNP National List, no. 156	2022	
114	József Attila Móring	8 October 1968	KDNP	Somogy County – 3rd constituency	Fidesz-KDNP National List, no. 92	2002	
115	Csaba Nagy	1970	Fidesz	Baranya County – 4th constituency	Fidesz-KDNP National List, no. 125	2010–2014, 2018	
116	István Nagy	6 October 1967	Fidesz	Győr-Moson-Sopron County – 5th constituency	Fidesz-KDNP National List, no. 104	2010	
122	Lajos Oláh	17 June 1969	DK	Budapest – 5th constituency	United for Hungary National List, no. 218	2006	
125	Anna Orosz	2 June 1989	Momentum	Budapest – 2nd constituency	United for Hungary National List, no. 224	2022	
127	Gábor Pajtók	18 February 1961	Fidesz	Heves County – 1st constituency	Fidesz-KDNP National List, no. 124	2022	
128	Károly Pánczél	3 April 1961	Fidesz	Pest County – 11th constituency	Fidesz-KDNP National List, no. 108	1998	
130	János Pócs	17 November 1963	Fidesz	Jász-Nagykun-Szolnok County – 2nd constituency	Fidesz-KDNP National List, no. 65	2010	
131	Tibor Pogácsás	4 April 1964	Fidesz	Pest County – 10th constituency	Fidesz-KDNP National List, no. 120	1998–2006, 2010	
132	László Pósán	20 September 1965	Fidesz	Hajdú-Bihar County – 2nd constituency	Fidesz-KDNP National List, no. 107	1998	
134	Bence Rétvári	10 December 1979	KDNP	Pest County – 4th constituency	Fidesz-KDNP National List, no. 109	2008	
136	Gábor Riz	5 March 1956	Fidesz	Borsod-Abaúj-Zemplén County – 3rd constituency	Fidesz-KDNP National List, no. 98	2010	
138	László Salacz	21 May 1971	Fidesz	Bács-Kiskun County – 1st constituency	Fidesz-KDNP National List, no. 116	2014	
147	Róbert Balázs Simon	9 April 1970	Fidesz	Győr-Moson-Sopron County – 1st constituency	Fidesz-KDNP National List, no. 132	2014	
149	Miklós Seszták	31 October 1968	KDNP	Szabolcs-Szatmár-Bereg County – 3rd constituency	Fidesz-KDNP National List, no. 117	2010	
153	Sándor Szabó	29 October 1975	MSZP	Csongrád-Csanád County – 1st constituency	United for Hungary National List, no. 184	2014	
154	Szabolcs Szabó	11 February 1979	Momentum	Budapest – 17th constituency	–	2014	
155	Tímea Szabó	18 January 1976	Dialogue	Budapest – 10th constituency	United for Hungary National List, no. 93	2010	
157	Tünde Szabó	31 May 1974	Fidesz	Szabolcs-Szatmár-Bereg County – 1st constituency	Fidesz-KDNP National List, no. 68	2018	
158	Zsolt Szabó	20 October 1963	Fidesz	Heves County – 3rd constituency	Fidesz-KDNP National List, no. 101	2010	
159	László Szászfalvi	11 January 1961	KDNP	Somogy County – 2nd constituency	Fidesz-KDNP National List, no. 84	1998	
160	Gyula Tamás Szeberényi	26 October 1967	Fidesz	Bács-Kiskun County – 2nd constituency	Fidesz-KDNP National List, no. 144	2022	
163	Lajos Szűcs	15 September 1964	Fidesz	Pest County – 7th constituency	Fidesz-KDNP National List, no. 155	2010	
164	András Tállai	5 February 1959	Fidesz	Borsod-Abaúj-Zemplén County – 7th constituency	Fidesz-KDNP National List, no. 61	1998	
166	László Tasó	14 January 1963	Fidesz	Hajdú-Bihar County – 3rd constituency	Fidesz-KDNP National List, no. 87	2004	
167	Zoltán Tessely	20 July 1967	Fidesz	Fejér County – 3rd constituency	Fidesz-KDNP National List, no. 73	2010	
168	István Tiba	6 May 1962	Fidesz	Hajdú-Bihar County – 6th constituency	Fidesz-KDNP National List, no. 59	2002–2006, 2008	
173	Attila Tilki	9 May 1967	Fidesz	Szabolcs-Szatmár-Bereg County – 4th constituency	Fidesz-KDNP National List, no. 111	2006	
	Bence Tordai	26 January 1981	Dialogue	Budapest – 4th constituency	United for Hungary National List, no. 279	2018	
174	Endre Tóth	16 April 1990	Momentum	Budapest – 18th constituency	United for Hungary National List, no. 200	2022	
175	Gábor Törő	7 March 1962	Fidesz	Fejér County – 2nd constituency	Fidesz-KDNP National List, no. 91	2010	
177	Bence Tuzson	31 January 1972	Fidesz	Pest County – 5th constituency	Fidesz-KDNP National List, no. 102	2014	
181	Zoltán Vajda	15 October 1974	MSZP	Budapest – 13th constituency	United for Hungary National List, no. 196	2022	
183	Gábor Varga	8 January 1968	Fidesz	Fejér County – 5th constituency	Fidesz-KDNP National List, no. 128	2010	
184	Judit Varga	10 September 1980	Fidesz		Fidesz-KDNP National List, no. 30	2022	
187	Tamás Vargha	2 February 1959	Fidesz	Fejér County – 1st constituency	Fidesz-KDNP National List, no. 114	2010	
188	László Varju	22 August 1961	DK	Budapest – 11th constituency	United for Hungary National List, no. 248	2002	
189	László Vécsey	1 September 1958	Fidesz	Pest County – 6th constituency	Fidesz-KDNP National List, no. 147	2010	
192	Győző Vinnai	17 December 1959	Fidesz	Szabolcs-Szatmár-Bereg County – 2nd constituency	Fidesz-KDNP National List, no. 75	2010	
193	Eszter Vitályos	23 February 1979	Fidesz	Pest County – 3rd constituency	Fidesz-KDNP National List, no. 60	2021	
194	István Vitányi	18 December 1952	Fidesz	Hajdú-Bihar County – 4th constituency	Fidesz-KDNP National List, no. 77	1998	
195	Attila Gelencsér	2 June 1977	Fidesz	Somogy County – 4th constituency	Fidesz-KDNP National List, no. 127	2014	
199	Róbert Zsigó	10 November 1967	Fidesz	Bács-Kiskun County – 6th constituency	Fidesz-KDNP National List, no. 112	1998	

=== List of former members ===
Image	Name	Date of birth	Party	Constituency	State	Notes	Ref.
	István Bajkai	17 January 1964	Fidesz		Fidesz-KDNP National List, no. 21	2018–2023	Died on 12 April 2023. Replaced by ...
