= Bernadett Bakos =

Hungarian politician (born 1992)

Member of the Hungarian Parliament
- In office 2022–2026

Personal details
- Born: 26 June 1992 (age 33) Budapest
- Party: LMP – Hungary's Green Party
- Education: Eötvös Loránd University
- Alma mater: Budapest University of Technology and Economics

Bernadett Bakos (born 26 June 1992) is a Hungarian civil engineer, economist, and politician. She was a member of the Hungarian Parliament, first elected at the 2022 Hungarian parliamentary election.

== Career ==
She was born in Budapest, completed her schooling (including music) in Kőbányán and graduated from the Ganz Ábrahám Bilingual Practical Vocational High School in Kispest. She was then admitted to the Faculty of Civil Engineering of the Budapest University of Technology and Economics, where she obtained his bachelor's degree in civil engineering in 2017. She then completed his master's degree in structural and civil engineering there, and later, in 2025, she obtained another degree in economics and management at Eötvös Loránd University. She is currently a student of the MBA program at ELTE. While obtaining his bachelor's degree in civil engineering (from 2017), she worked as a technical assistant in the construction industry, and then as a static designer between 2018 and 2021.

In addition to her technical career, she became active in public life, becoming a member of the LMP. She ran in Kőbánya in the 2019 Hungarian local elections then became an external member of the Climate Protection and Environmental Protection Committee of the Metropolitan Assembly, and was later elected a member of the party's Budapest presidency. In November 2020, following the death of MP Balázs Tóth, she became a local government representative and chairman of the budget committee in Kőbánya. In the 2022 Hungarian parliamentary election, she ran in 50th place on the United for Hungary joint list (fourth among the LMP candidates). After a joint opposition agreement, she took over his mandate before the inaugural session, thus becoming a member of the National Assembly. She took the seat of Klára Dobrev. Following the dissolution of the LMP faction, she was an independent Member of Parliament since 2025. In the Parliament, she focused on with construction, transport and economic issues.

== See also ==
- List of members of the National Assembly of Hungary (2022–2026)
