= Budapest 18th constituency =

Hungarian legislative district (2011–2026)

Budapest 18th constituency (District XXII.)
- Former constituency for the National Assembly
- Location of Budapest 18 within Budapest

- Location of Budapest within Hungary
- City: Budapest
- Electorate: 77,546 (2018)
- Major settlements: 22nd District

Former constituency
- Created: 2011
- Abolished: 2026
- Party: Fidesz–KDNP
- Member: Gyula Molnár
- Created from: Constituency no. 16; Constituency no. 32
- Elected: 2018

The 18th constituency of Budapest (Hungarian: Budapesti 18. számú országgyűlési egyéni választókerület) was one of the single-member constituencies of the National Assembly, the national legislature of Hungary. The constituency standard abbreviation: Budapest 18. OEVK.

From 2018 to 2026, it was represented by Gyula Molnár of the Fidesz–KDNP party alliance.

== History ==
The constituency was abolished at the 2026 Hungarian parliamentary election along with the Budapest 17th constituency.

== Geography ==
The 2nd constituency is located in the southern part of Buda.

The constituency borders the 2nd constituency to the north, 6th- and 17th constituency to the east, 8th constituency of Pest County to the south, 1st- and 2nd constituency of Pest County to the west.

=== List of districts ===
The constituency includes the following municipalities:

1. District XXII.: Full part of the district.
2. District XI.: Southern part (Nándorkert, Albertfalva, Kelenvölgy and Péterhegy) of the district.

== History ==
The 2nd constituency of Budapest was created in 2011 and contained parts of the pre-2011 16th and 32nd constituencies of Budapest. Its borders were not changed since its creation.

== Members ==
The constituency was first represented by Attila Szabolcs of the Fidesz from 2014 to 2018. Gyula Molnár of the MSZP was elected in 2018.

Election	Member	Party	%
2014	Attila Szabolcs	Fidesz	41.6
2018	Gyula Molnár	MSZP (until 2021)	41.5
2018	Gyula Molnár	DK (from 2021)	41.5
2022	Endre Tóth	Momentum	48.5

== Election result ==
=== 2022 election ===
2022 parliamentary election: Budapest - 10th constituency
Party	Candidate	Votes	%	±%
United for Hungary	Endre Tóth	28,964	48.47	
Fidesz–KDNP	Zsolt Németh	25,120	42.03	+1.97
Mi Hazánk	Tamás Esze	2,531	4.24	New
MKKP	Attila Ozsvát	2,019	3.38	+1.36
MEMO	Zoltán Papp	613	1.03	New
NÉP	Gábor Dániel Szabó	425	0.71	New
Leftist Alliance	Richárd Schlenk	89	0.15	
Majority		3,844	6.44	
Turnout		60,456	78.4	± 0.0
Registered electors		77,117		
United for Hungary hold		Swing	+5.1	

=== 2018 election ===
2018 parliamentary election: Budapest - 10th constituency
Party	Candidate	Votes	%	±%
MSZP–Dialogue	Gyula Molnár	24,983	41.45	as Unity
Fidesz–KDNP	Zsolt Németh	24,144	40.06	+3.2
Jobbik	Dr. Gábor Staudt	5,525	9.17	−3.01
LMP	Dániel Pitz	2,556	4.24	
Momentum	Anna Orosz	1,703	2.83	New
MKKP	Antal Hotz	1,220	2.02	New
AQP	Márton Szeibert	145	0.24	
Majority		839	1.39	
Turnout		60,798	78.4	▲6.63
Registered electors		77,546		
MSZP–Dialogue hold		Swing	-3.4	

=== 2014 election ===
2014 parliamentary election: Budapest - 18th constituency
Party	Candidate	Votes	%	±%
Fidesz–KDNP	Attila Szabolcs	23,189	41.64	
Unity	Ágnes Somfai	20,189	36.86	
Jobbik	Dr. Gábor Staudt	6,784	12.18	
LMP	Andrea Gecsei-Tóth	3,601	6.47	
Party of Greens	Veronika Kovács-Haász	499	0.9	
SEM	Ferenc Vadász	286	0.51	
Soc Dems	Éva Margit Freisz-Horváth	229	0.41	
KTI	Ákos Tamás Köhler	179	0.32	
FKGP	Donát Boldizsár Nagy	1139	0.25	
JESZ	Károly Bagdi	123	0.22	
AQP	Péter Miklósné Varga	119	0.21	
MRPP	Csaba Szántó	14	0.03	
Majority		2,666	4.78	
Turnout		56,242	71.77	
Registered electors		78,362		
Fidesz–KDNP win (new seat)				
