= Szabolcs Szabó =

Hungarian geographer and politician

Member of the National Assembly
- In office 6 May 2014 – 8 May 2026
- Succeeded by: Vilmos Kátai-Németh

Personal details
- Born: 11 February 1979 (age 47) Gyula, Hungary
- Party: Együtt (2012–18)
- Other party: Solidarity; LMP; Momentum

Szabolcs Szabó (born 11 February 1979) is a geographer and politician, who had been a Member of Parliament (MP) for Csepel–Soroksár (Budapest Constituency XVII) from 2014 to 2026. During his career as MP, he represented various parties.

== Biography ==
Szabó was born in Gyula on 11 February 1979. He finished his secondary studies at the Széchenyi István Economics and Foreign Trade Secondary School in Békéscsaba. He earned a degree of geographer at the Faculty of Sciences of the Eötvös Loránd University in 2002. He teaches as an assistant lecturer since 2004 and as a lecturer there since 2010. He is an elected member of the board of the university's Institute of Geography and Earth Sciences.

As a member of the Hungarian Solidarity Movement, he joined Together party. He was the joint individual candidate of the Unity electoral alliance in Budapest Constituency XVII during the 2014 parliamentary election. He defeated Fidesz politician Szilárd Németh and gained a parliamentary seat. He became an independent MP, as Together was unable to form a caucus according to the house rules. He was involved in the Culture Committee from 2014 to 2026.

Szabó was again nominated as his party's candidate for the individual seat of Csepel–Soroksár during the 2018 parliamentary election. Following long disputes, his candidacy was also supported by MSZP, LMP and Momentum. Szabó again defeated Szilárd Németh (Fidesz), becoming his party's only MP, as Together did not reach the 5% election threshold. Subsequently, he joined the LMP parliamentary group, "with whom he can best agree on a political-ideological point of view". Following internal conflicts within the party, Szabó left the LMP's parliamentary group on 2 October 2018, alongside Bernadett Szél. Thereafter, he sat as an independent in the parliament.

The Momentum Movement nominated Szabó as their candidate in Csepel constituency during the 2021 Hungarian opposition primary. Szabó ultimately won the primary race, becoming candidate of the electoral opposition alliance United for Hungary for the 2022 Hungarian parliamentary election. Szabó was re-elected MP for Csepel during the election and joined the opposition Momentum parliamentary group. He was a member of the Committee of Justice from 2022 to 2026. After his constituency (Budapest 17th constituency) was abolished, Szabó intended to run as a non-partisan candidate in the significantly redrawn Budapest 9th constituency during the 2026 Hungarian parliamentary election. On 23 February 2026, however, Szabó announced that he withdrew his candidacy in favour of Tisza Party, because "his experiences indicate that under the current circumstances he would not be able to win the parliamentary election in his district," as he does not have a nominating organization.
