= Civic Response =

Former Hungarian political party

Civic Response Polgári Válasz
- President: Dániel Aczél
- Founder: János Bencsik
- Founded: 4 December 2020
- Split from: Jobbik
- Ideology: Liberal conservatism Conservatism; Christian democracy Economic liberalism
- Political position: Centre-right to right-wing
- Colours: Brick red Blue-gray
- Slogan: «Tradition, Efficiency, Responsibility» (Hungarian: «Hagyomány, teljesítmény, felelősség»)
- National Assembly: 0 / 199
- European Parliament: 0 / 21
- County Assemblies: 0 / 381

Website
- polgarivalasz.hu

Civic Response (Hungarian: Polgári Válasz, pronounced [ˈpolɡaːri ˈvaːlɒs]) was a Hungarian centre-right to right-wing, civic conservative political party founded in 2020 by János Bencsik, an independent MP.

== History ==
János Bencsik, a former Jobbik MP, founded the Civic Response on 4 December 2020, because Jobbik joined the electoral coalition of the left-wing opposition parties. The founders were János Bencsik, an independent member of the parliament from Jobbik, Mihátsiné Dózsa Hajnalka, independent mayor of Ostffysszonyfa, Kálmán Rába, member of the Vas county assembly, Kőszeg municipal representative, and Dániel Varga, Budapest I. district local government representative. Previously, János Bencsik, Kálmán Rába and Dániel Varga were also politicians in Jobbik, and Hajnalka Mihátsiné Dózsa is also a founding member of the Közön Vas Megyért Egyesület, whose president is Tibor Bana, a member of parliament who also left Jobbik.

Their departure from the party was part of the exit wave that followed Jobbik's reform at the beginning of the year. The internal conflicts were caused by the fact that several people came face-to-face with Péter Jakab, who won a landslide victory in the reform, and the party's new presidency. After that, Tibor Bana and János Bencsik left Jobbik and the party's parliamentary faction.

On 2 February 2021, Bencsik and the Civil Response activists tried to close the Las Vegas Casino owned by the close-to-government entrepreneur István Garancsi.

On 21 February 2021, another MP Tamás Sneider joined the Civic Response. Currently, the party has several County Assembly members, local mayors and councillors.

On 4 March, it was announced that the Civil Response would be transformed into a party, and at the same time it was also announced that the party would run independently in the 2022 parliamentary elections, with its own list, and in the individual constituencies nominates its own candidates.

On 5 February 2022, János Bencsik announced that his party would not present its own list, and that they would run a candidate in only one district.

On 4 September 2022, János Bencsik was replaced at the head of the party by Dániel Aczél.

In November 2022, the fifth Orbán government appointed János Bencsik Consul General in Toronto, but he was denied a visa from Canada due to his far-right past with the party Jobbik, and therefore he was unable to take up his post. In 2025, he was instead made a senior diplomat at the embassy in Copenhagen.

In 2024, the movement was put under termination proceedings.

== History of leaders ==
	Image	Name	Entered office	Left office	Length of Leadership
1		János Bencsik	4 December 2020	4 September 2022	1 year, 9 months
2		Dániel Aczél	4 September 2022	2024	

== Electoral results ==
=== National Assembly ===
Election	Leader	Constituency		Party list		Seats	+/–	Status
Election	Leader	Votes	%	Votes	%	Seats	+/–	Status
2022	János Bencsik	521	0.01% (#9)	—N/a		0 / 199	New	Extra-parliamentary
