= János Kővári =

Hungarian politician

Member of the National Assembly
- In office 14 May 2010 – 5 May 2014

Personal details
- Born: 5 April 1971 (age 54) Pécs, Hungary
- Party: Alliance for Pécs Association
- Children: 4
- Profession: politician

János Kővári (born 5 April 1971) is a Hungarian politician, member of the National Assembly (MP) for Pécs (Baranya County Constituency III) between 2010 and 2014. He was a member of the Committee on Human Rights, Minority, Civic and Religious Affairs.

In October 2009 he was the candidate of the Fidesz during the by-election in Pécs (Baranya County Constituency III), after MP László Toller, who had been in a coma, declared incapacitated. After three unsuccessful rounds, fourth time Kővári received a whopping 88.3% of the votes, however, only 11% of registered voters cast their ballots, less than half of the 25% required for the result to be binding. After that the MP position remained vacant.

His local movement, the Alliance for Pécs Association (ÖPE) ran independently from the Fidesz during the 2014 local elections. Kővári was a non-partisan candidate for the position of Mayor of Pécs, but defeated by incumbent mayor Zsolt Páva.

== Personal life ==
He is married and has four children.
