= Budapest 17th constituency =

Former Hungarian constituency

Budapest 17th constituency (District XXI.)
- Former constituency for the National Assembly
- Location of Budapest 17 within Budapest

- Location of Budapest within Hungary
- City: Budapest
- Electorate: 74,456 (2022)
- Major settlements: 21st District

Former constituency
- Created: 2011
- Abolished: 2026
- Party: Independent
- Member: Szabolcs Szabó
- Elected: 2014, 2018, 2022

The 17th constituency of Budapest (Hungarian: Budapesti 17. számú országgyűlési egyéni választókerület) was one of the single-member constituencies of the National Assembly, the national legislature of Hungary. The constituency standard abbreviation: Budapest 17. OEVK.

From 2014 to 2026, it was represented by independent politician Szabolcs Szabó, supported by Momentum.

== History ==
The constituency was abolished at the 2026 Hungarian parliamentary election along with the Budapest 18th constituency.

== Geography ==
The 17th constituency was located in southern part of Pest, and part of Csepel Island.

=== List of districts ===
The constituency included the following municipalities:

1. District XXI.: Full part of the district.
2. District XXIII.: Full part of the district.

== Members ==
Election	Member	Party	%
2014	Szabolcs Szabó	Together	36.37%
2018	Szabolcs Szabó	Together	42.45%
2022	Szabolcs Szabó	United for Hungary	46.49%
