= Csaba Nagy =

Hungarian architect and politician

Member of the National Assembly
- In office 8 May 2018 – 8 May 2026
- In office 14 May 2010 – 5 May 2014

Personal details
- Born: 13 August 1970 (age 55) Pécs, Hungary
- Party: Fidesz (since 1988)
- Children: 2
- Profession: architect, politician

Csaba Nagy (born 13 August 1970) is a Hungarian architect and politician, member of the National Assembly (MP) for Pécs (Baranya County Constituency II) from 2010 to 2014, and for Szigetvár (Baranya County Constituency IV) from 2018 to 2026.

He served as deputy mayor of Pécs from June 4, 2009 to October 3, 2014. Nagy was a member of the Committee on Local Government and Regional Development from May 14, 2010 to May 5, 2014 and also of the Committee on Culture and the Press from September 23, 2013 to May 5, 2014. He was appointed President of the General Assembly of Baranya County in 2014, replacing Zsolt Tiffán. He held the position until 2018.

Nagy returned to the National Assembly after the 2018 parliamentary election, obtaining a mandate in Szigetvár constituency and replacing fellow Fidesz member Zsolt Tiffán. He became a member of the Committee on Culture (May–October 2018) then of the Legislative Committee (since October 2018). He was re-elected MP for Szigetvár in the 2022 parliamentary election. Nagy was defeated by Tisza candidate Balázs Kapronczai in the 2026 Hungarian parliamentary election.

Nagy was re-elected President of the General Assembly of Baranya County in July 2026, replacing László Őri.

== Personal life ==
He is married and has two children.
