= József Kovács (politician) =

Hungarian physician and politician

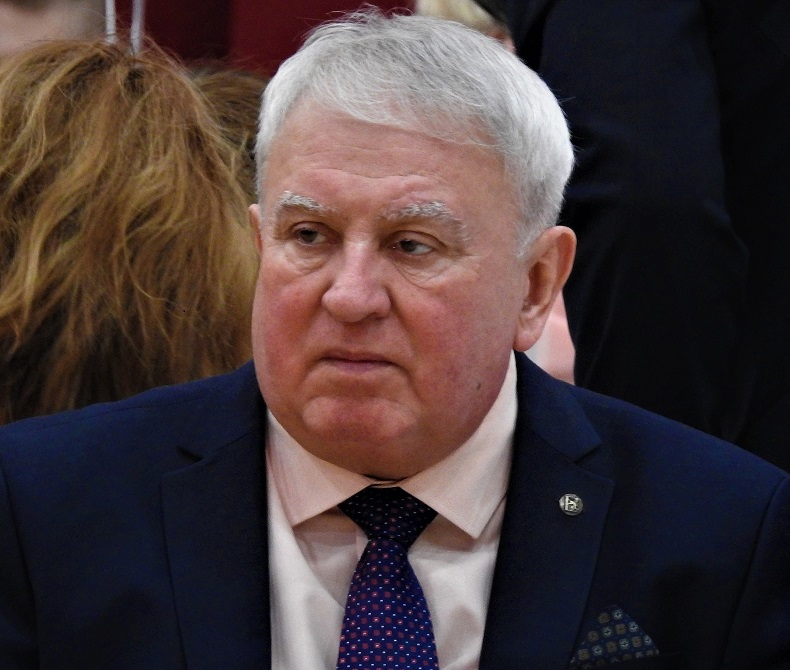
- Kovács in 2019

Member of the National Assembly
- In office 14 May 2010 – 8 May 2026

Personal details
- Born: 15 July 1951 (age 74) Jászszentlászló, Hungary
- Party: Fidesz
- Children: 3
- Profession: Physician, politician

Dr. József Kovács (born 15 July 1951) is a Hungarian physician and politician, member of the National Assembly (MP) for Gyula (Békés County Constituency II then III) from 2010 to 2026.

Kovács was a member of the local representative body of Gyula from 1994 to 1998 and from 2001 to 2010. He was also a member of the Békés County Assembly between 1998 and 2006. Kovács is the current Vice President of the Hungarian Red Cross since 2008. He was a member of the Parliamentary Committee on Health since 14 May 2010. He was elected Chairman of the Committee on Health, when István Mikola, then chairman, was appointed Hungarian Ambassador to the Organisation for Economic Co-operation and Development (OECD), and resigned from his parliamentary seat on 28 February 2011. He was elected Vice Chairman of the Committee on Welfare following the 2014 parliamentary election, holding the position until 2026. He did not run in the 2026 Hungarian parliamentary election.

== Personal life ==
He is married and has three children.
