= Tamás Herczeg =

Hungarian politician (born 1960)

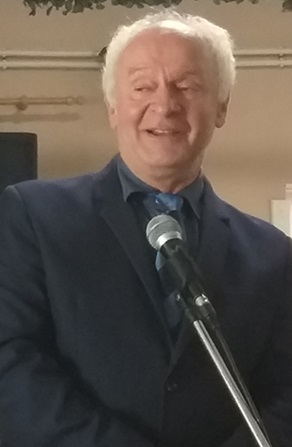
- Herczeg in 2023

Member of the National Assembly
- In office 8 May 2018 – 8 May 2026

Personal details
- Born: 16 November 1960 (age 65) Medgyesegyháza, Hungary
- Party: Fidesz

Tamás Herczeg (born 16 November 1960) is a Hungarian politician and teacher at the College of Folk Culture. He was a member of National Assembly of Hungary (Országgyűlés) from 2018 to 2026, representing Békéscsaba. He is a member of Fidesz.

In the parliament, Herczeg was a member of the Legislative Committee from 2018 to 2022 and of the National Cohesion Committee from 2022 to 2026. He did not run in the 2026 Hungarian parliamentary election.
