= Balázs Ander =

Hungarian politician

Balázs Ander (born 11 December 1976) is a Hungarian politician, vice-president of Jobbik and member of National Assembly since 2014.

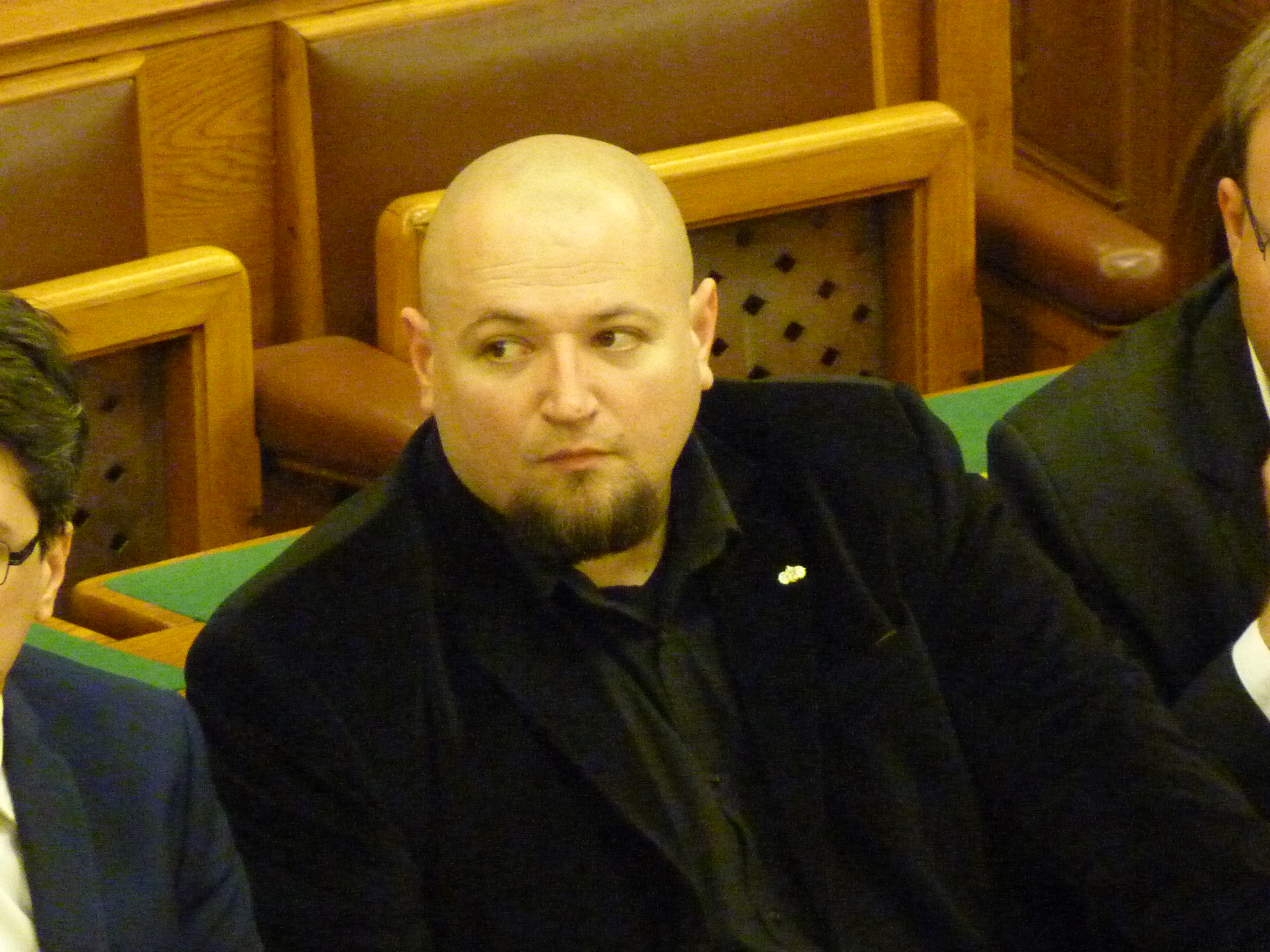
Ander in 2016

== Early life ==
Ander was born in Nagyatád. He graduated from the Faculty of Humanities of the University of Pécs. He was a history teacher in Barcs. He is married and raised three children.

== Political career ==
He has been the president of Jobbik's Barcs group. In 2010, he was member of General Assembly of Somogy. Since 2014 he is a member of National Assembly.

On 25 January 2020, Ander was elected for vice president of Jobbik.
