= Zsolt Németh (politician, 1963) =

Hungarian economist and politician

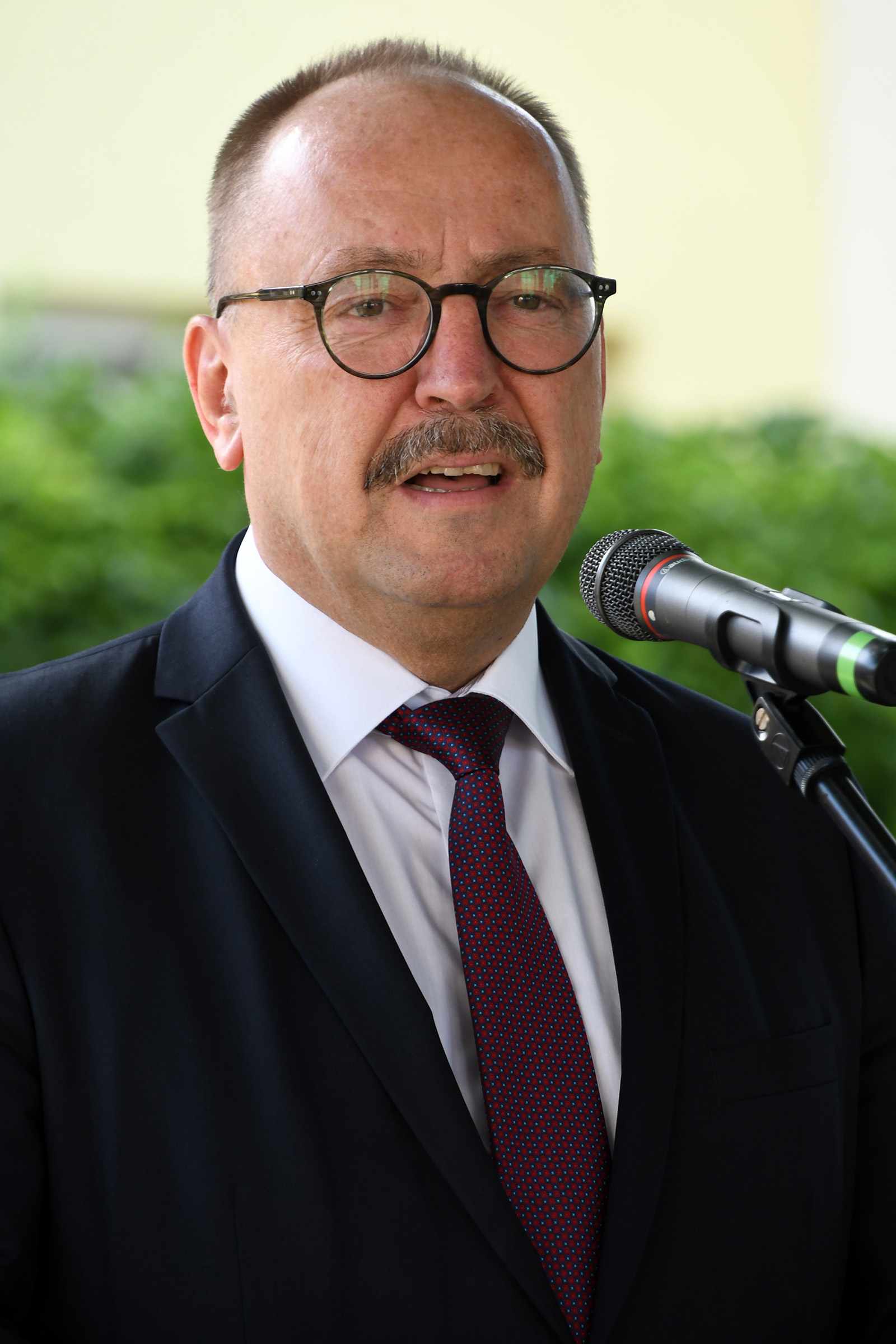
- Zsolt Németh in 2021

Member of the National Assembly
- Incumbent
- Assumed office 2 May 1990

Personal details
- Born: 14 October 1963 (age 62) Budapest, Hungary
- Party: Fidesz (since 1988)
- Spouse: Ildikó Forgács
- Children: Judit; Dániel; Zsófia
- Parent(s): Géza Németh; Judit Kriza
- Profession: economist, politician

Zsolt Attila Németh (born 14 October 1963) is a Hungarian economist and politician, who served as Secretary of State for Foreign Affairs between 2 June 2010 and 5 June 2014, a position he previously also held from 1998 to 2002, both under Foreign Minister János Martonyi. He became a member of the National Assembly (MP) in the 1990 parliamentary election.

Németh served as president of the Parliamentary Committee on Human Rights, Minorities and Religion from 1993 to 1994 and of the Parliamentary Committee for Foreign Affairs from 2002 to 2010 and from 2014.

== Personal life ==
He is married. His wife is Ildikó Forgács. They have three children - two daughters, Judit and Zsófia and a son, Dániel.
