= Gábor Varga (politician) =

Hungarian politician (born 1968)

Member of the National Assembly
- Incumbent
- Assumed office 14 May 2010

Personal details
- Born: 8 January 1968 (age 58) Sárbogárd, Hungary
- Party: Fidesz (since 2002)
- Children: 2
- Profession: Teacher; politician

Gábor Varga (born 8 January 1968) is a Hungarian teacher and politician, member of the National Assembly (MP) for Sárbogárd (Fejér County Constituency VI then V) since 2010. He served as the mayor of Cece from 2002 to 2014 and he was also elected as member of the General Assembly of Fejér County in 2006.

He joined Fidesz in 2002. He was elected MP for Sárbogárd during the 2010 Hungarian parliamentary election. He was a member of the Committee on Consumer Protection from 14 May 2010 to 5 May 2014. He is a member of the Committee on Sustainable Development since 6 May 2014 and of the Economic Committee since 15 October 2018.

== Personal life ==
He is married and has two children.
