= Dávid Dócs =

Hungarian politician (born 1987)

Member of the National Assembly
- Incumbent
- Assumed office 2 May 2022

Personal details
- Born: 25 February 1987 (age 39)
- Party: Our Homeland Movement

Dávid Dócs (born 25 February 1987) is a Hungarian politician serving as a member of the National Assembly since 2022. From 2015 to 2022, he served as mayor of Cserháthaláp.
