= Leftist Alliance (Hungary) =

Political party in Hungary

Leftist Alliance Baloldali Szövetség
- Leader: Tibor Szanyi
- Ideology: Kádárism; Anti-capitalism; Factions: Democratic socialism Communism
- Political position: Left-wing to far-left
- European affiliation: None
- National Assembly: 0 / 199
- European Parliament: 0 / 21
- County Assemblies: 0 / 381

The Leftist Alliance (Hungarian: Baloldali Szövetség) was an electoral coalition of Anti-capitalist parties in Hungary that was founded by the Yes Solidarity for Hungary Movement and the Hungarian Workers' Party to contest the 2022 Hungarian parliamentary election.

== Election results ==
=== National Assembly ===
Election	Leader	Constituency		Party list		Seats	+/–	Status
Election	Leader	Votes	%	Votes	%	Seats	+/–	Status
2022	Tibor Szanyi	8,678	0.16% (#7)	—N/a		0 / 199	New	Extra-parliamentary
