= 2022 Hungarian parliamentary election =

- 3 April 2022

All 199 seats in the National Assembly 100 seats needed for a majority
- Opinion polls
- Turnout: 69.59% (▼0.14 pp)
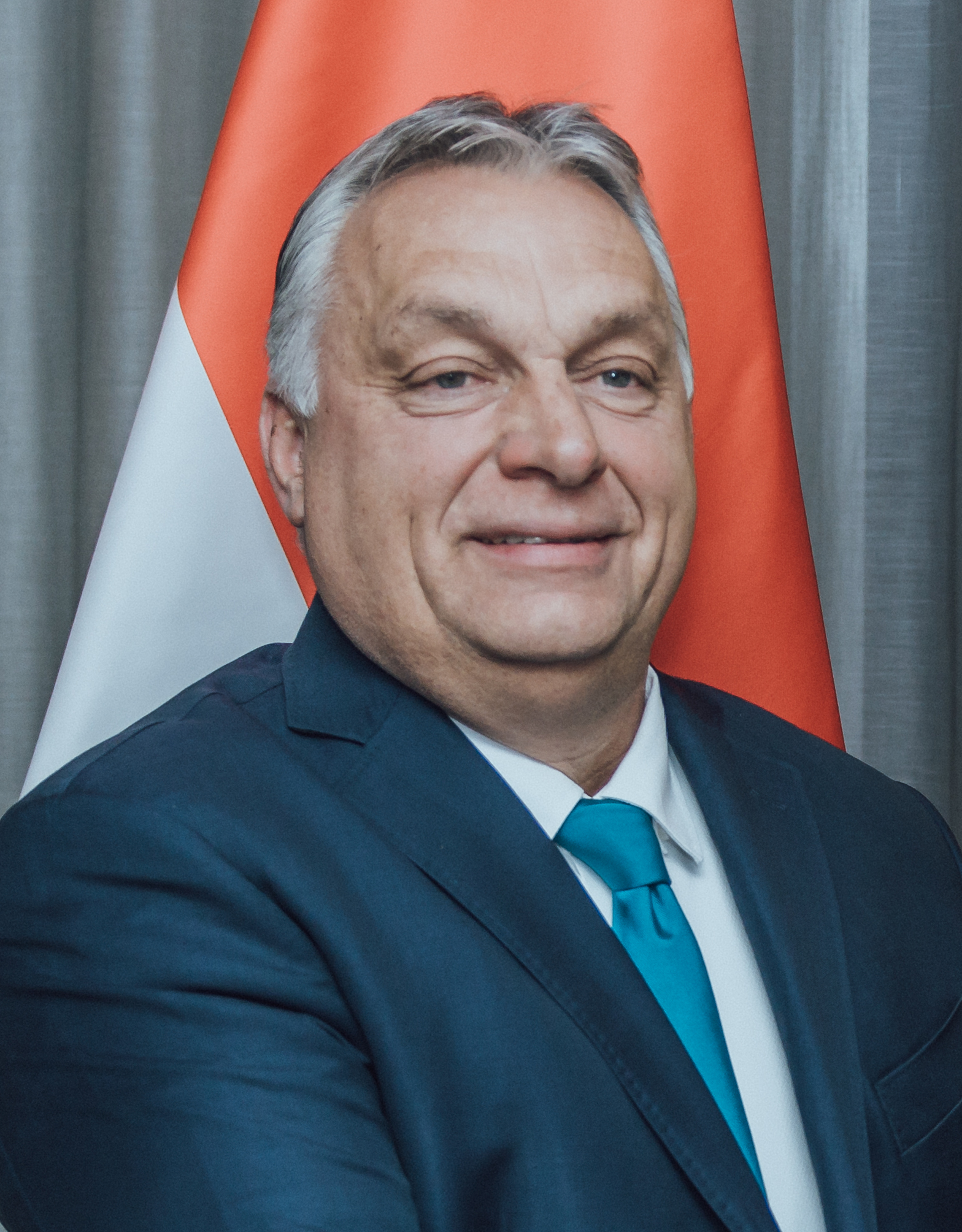

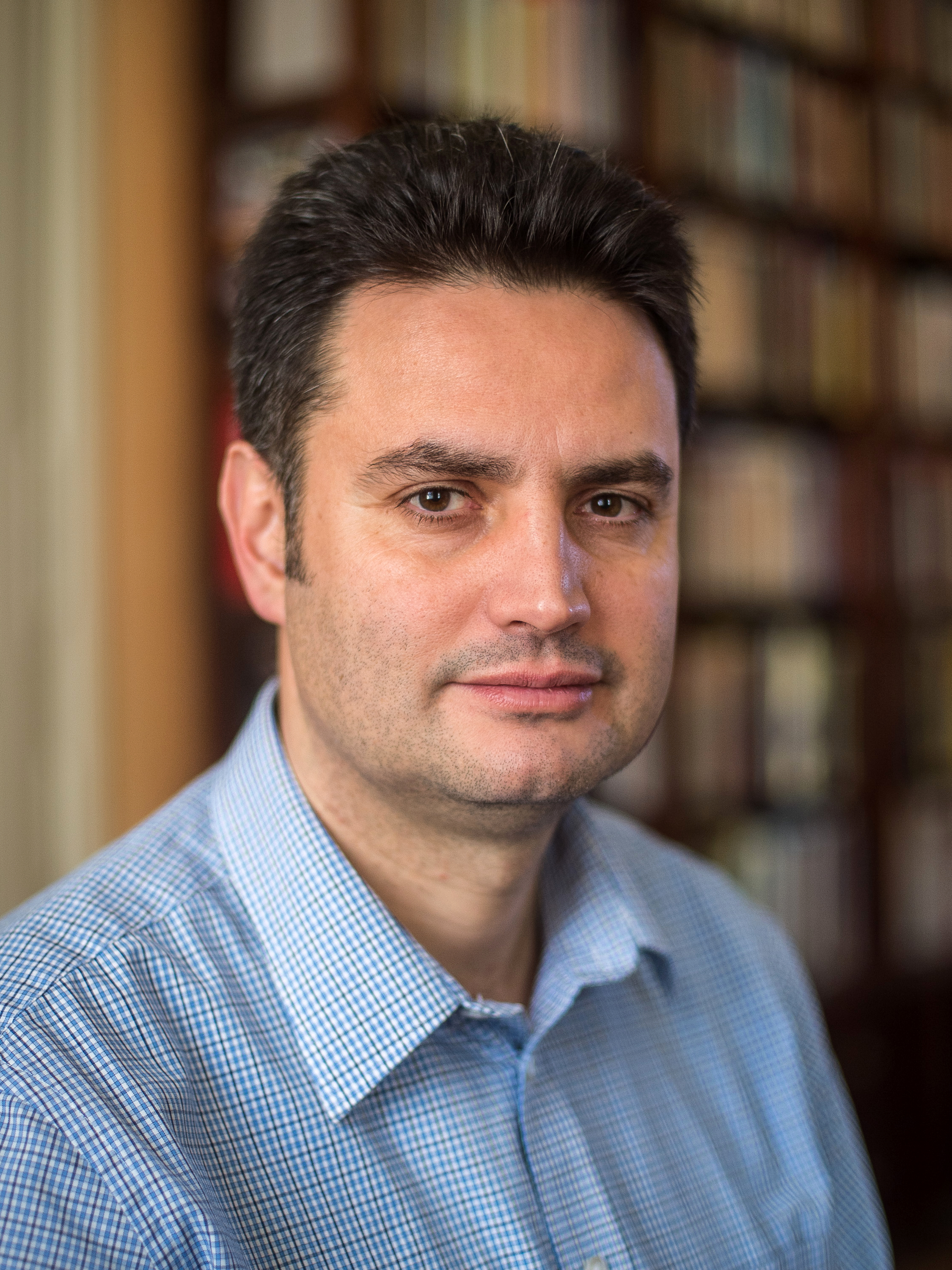

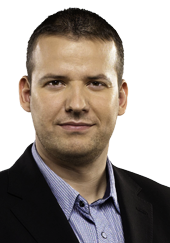
	First party	Second party	Third party
Candidate	Viktor Orbán	Péter Márki-Zay	László Toroczkai
Party	Fidesz	Independent (MMM)	Mi Hazánk
Alliance	Fidesz–KDNP	EM
Leader since	17 May 2003 (Note: As Fidesz leader.)	17 October 2021	23 June 2018
Last election	133 seats, 49.27%	65 seats, 32.66% (Note: The overall seats of DK, Jobbik, MSZP, LMP, Párbeszéd, Együtt (dissolved after the election) and an independent politician who ran separetaly. Momentum didn't get into the Parliament.)	Did not exist (Note: Our Homeland Movement (Mi Hazánk) was formed in 2018. Four deputies defected from Jobbik and joined Mi Hazánk, but two of them later left the party. Within the National Assembly, they are labeled as independents, as the party did not have its own parliamentary group. Hungarian Justice and Life Party (MIÉP), which merged in Mi Hazánk in 2021, won 0.15% in 2018.)
Seats won	135	57	6
Seat change	▲2	▼6	New party
Constituency vote	2,823,419	1,983,708	307,064
%	52.52%	36.90%	5.71%
Party vote	3,060,706	1,947,331	332,487
% and swing	54.13% ▲4.86 pp	34.44% ▼12.03 pp	5.88% (New)
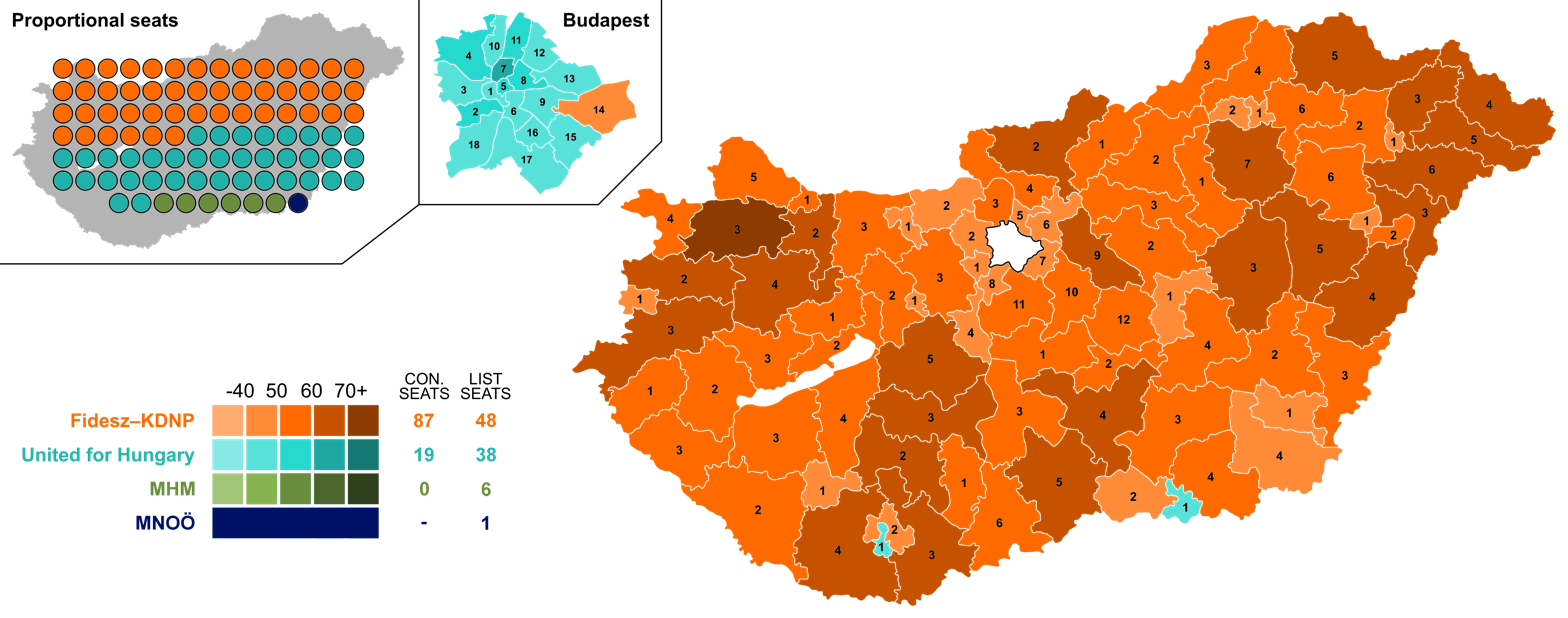
- Results of the election. A darker shade indicates a higher vote share. Proportional list results are displayed in the top left.
Government before election
Fourth Orbán Government
Fidesz–KDNP
Government after election
Fifth Orbán Government
Fidesz–KDNP

Parliamentary elections were held in Hungary on 3 April 2022 to elect the National Assembly, coinciding with a referendum. Hungary's incumbent prime minister Viktor Orbán won re-election to a fourth term. Addressing his supporters after the partial results showed Fidesz–KDNP leading by a wide margin, Orbán said: "We won a victory so big that you can see it from the moon, and you can certainly see it from Brussels." Opposition leader Péter Márki-Zay admitted defeat shortly after Orbán's speech. Reuters described it as a "crushing victory".

With 54.13% of the popular vote, Fidesz received the highest vote share by any party since the Fall of Communism in 1989. The election had been predicted to be closer than in previous years but Fidesz still held a 5–6 percentage point lead in the polls leading up to the vote. OSCE deployed a full monitoring mission for the vote. The results showed that Fidesz outperformed polls, winning its first absolute majority of the vote share since 2010 while expanding its supermajority to control 135 seats of the 199-seat Parliament, comfortably ahead of the opposition alliance United for Hungary, which was set to win 57 seats after 100% of the votes had been counted. The Our Homeland Movement party won seats for the first time, obtaining 6 seats.

Internationally, the election was seen as a victory for right-wing populism with Orbán being an ally of then former US President Donald Trump and other right-wing figures.

== Background ==
=== Creation of joint opposition list ===
On 8 April 2018, just like in 2010 and 2014, Fidesz-KDNP won with two-third majority, collecting almost every second votes of people. Following the election, the main opposition parties, which had previously run alone or partly united, gradually realized that Fidesz could only be defeated through full cooperation. The first step of this was a joint demonstration in December of that year against the so called "slave law", which would have required workers to work in overtime.

In 2019 local elections, Democratic Coalition, Jobbik, LMP – Hungary's Green Party, Hungarian Socialist Party, Momentum Movement, Dialogue for Hungary, and numerous other parties or independent candidates ran in joint lists. It enabled opposition parties to win the majority in the General Assembly of Budapest and in ten of the 23 cities with county rights.

On 13 August 2020, the six parties decided to field joint candidates in all of Hungary's 106 constituencies and launch a joint program for the elections, later agreed on running with a common candidate for Prime Minister, to be selected in a primary election. They expected the candidate to be selected by 23 October 2021. On 20 December 2020, DK, Jobbik, Momentum, MSZP, LMP and Dialogue decided on running together on a common list, solidifying their electoral alliance. The leaders of the respective parties have also signed a declaration containing the terms of their cooperation, titled "Korszakváltás Garanciái" (Principles for Hungary's governance after 2022"). The opposition coalition was very ideologically diverse, something described by observers as a potential hindrance to presenting a united front to defeat Orbán.

=== Amendment of the electoral law ===
The electoral law, under which the previous two elections were held (2014 and 2018), specified the number of constituency candidates a party needed to run nationwide at 27, in at least 9 counties. On 15 December 2020, the National Assembly, in which the governing parties held the needed a two-third majority, voted to increase the requirements to a total of 71 constituency candidates in at least 14 counties and the capital.

=== Opposition primary ===
The Opposition primary was held in Hungary, between 12 and 27 September 2021 (first round) and 10–16 October 2021 (second round), to select the candidate for Prime Minister supported by the opposition parties to form a coalition to compete in the 2022 Hungarian parliamentary election. It was the first countrywide primary election in the political history of Hungary. On 17 October 2021, non-partisan candidate Péter Márki-Zay won in the runoff (second round) of the opposition primary, becoming the United Opposition candidate in the election for prime minister. The parties had also selected common candidates for single-member districts via the primary in the first round.

== Electoral system ==
The 199 members of the National Assembly are to be elected by mixed-member majoritarian representation with two methods; 106 are elected in single-member constituencies by first-past-the-post voting, with the remaining 93 elected from a single nationwide constituency mostly by proportional representation, via a partially compensatory system (a hybrid of parallel voting and mixed single vote). The electoral threshold is set at 5%, although this is raised to 10% for coalitions of two parties and 15% for coalitions of three or more parties. Seats are allocated using the d'Hondt method.

The governing party is allowed to draw the boundaries of the single-member constituencies, and the boundaries were gerrymandered by the Fidesz government prior to the 2014 elections. The redrawing was done in a way that smaller constituencies (with fewer than 70,000 voters) had higher concentrations of Fidesz voters than larger constituencies (over 80,000 voters), meaning fewer votes were required to elect Fidesz constituency candidates. In 2010, seats varied in population by 35%.

Since 2014 each of the Armenian, Bulgarian, Croatian, German, Greek, Polish, Romani, Romanian, Rusyn, Serbian, Slovak, Slovenian, and Ukrainian ethnic minorities can win one of the 93 party lists seats if they register as a specific list and reach a lowered quota of $\frac{1}{4 \times 93}=\frac{1}{372}\approx0.2688\%$ of the total of party list votes. Each minority is able to send a minority spokesman – without the rights of an MP – to the National Assembly, if the list does not reach this lowered quota. Due to internal disputes, the National Self-Government of Romani did not participate in the election.

== Parties and coalitions ==
The following parties were represented in the National Assembly, or have commonly included in public opinion polling:

Party/Coalition Full name		Ideology	Leader(s)	2018 result		Seats just before the election
Party/Coalition Full name		Ideology	Leader(s)	Votes (%)	Seats	Seats just before the election
Fidesz–KDNP	Fidesz; Fidesz – Hungarian Civic Alliance	National conservatism	Viktor Orbán	49.27	117 / 199	116 / 199
Fidesz–KDNP	KDNP; Christian Democratic People's Party	Christian right	Zsolt Semjén	49.27	16 / 199	17 / 199
EM; United for Hungary	Jobbik; Movement for a Better Hungary	Conservatism	Péter Jakab	19.06	26 / 199	17 / 199
EM; United for Hungary	MSZP; Hungarian Socialist Party	Social democracy	Bertalan Tóth; Ágnes Kunhalmi	11.31	15 / 199	15 / 199
EM; United for Hungary	Párbeszéd; Dialogue for Hungary	Green politics	Gergely Karácsony; Tímea Szabó	11.31	5 / 199	5 / 199
EM; United for Hungary	DK; Democratic Coalition	Social liberalism	Ferenc Gyurcsány	5.38	9 / 199	9 / 199
EM; United for Hungary	LMP; LMP – Hungary's Green Party	Green liberalism	Máté Kanász-Nagy; Erzsébet Schmuck	7.06	8 / 199	6 / 199
EM; United for Hungary	Momentum; Momentum Movement	Liberalism	Anna Donáth	3.06	0 / 199	0 / 199
Együtt; Together		Social liberalism	Péter Juhász	0.66	1 / 199	0 / 199 (Note: Dissolved after the election.)
MNOÖ (Note: As a nationwide representative organization.); National Self-Government of Germans in Hungary		German minority interests	Imre Ritter	0.46	1 / 199	1 / 199
MKKP; Hungarian Two Tailed Dog Party		Joke party	Gergely Kovács; Zsuzsanna Döme	1.73	0 / 199	0 / 199
MH; Our Homeland Movement		Hungarian nationalism	László Toroczkai	Did not exist		2 / 199
Függetlenek; Independents		–	–	1.01 (Note: Constituency votes only; independents cannot run for the party list component.)	1 / 199	11 / 199 (Note: All deputies who are not members of a parliamentary group are designated as independent. Five of them are affiliated with a political party. Their composition is as follows: Civil Response (2); ReforMers (1); Volner Party (1); ISZOMM (1))

== Campaign ==
During the election, Orbán and Fidesz portrayed the election as a choice between peace or war, with Fidesz for peace and the opposition for war.

== Results ==
Turnout (within Hungary only, excluding eligible voters abroad)
7:00	9:00	11:00	13:00	15:00	17:00	18:30	Overall
1.82%	10.31%	25.77%	40.01%	52.75%	62.92%	67.80%	70.21%

Party	Party-list			Constituency			Total seats	+/–
Party	Votes	%	Seats	Votes	%	Seats	Total seats	+/–
Fidesz–KDNP	3,060,706	54.13	48	2,823,419	52.52	87	135	+2
United for Hungary (Note: DK, Jobbik, Momentum Movement, MSZP, LMP, Párbeszéd)	1,947,331	34.44	38	1,983,708	36.90	19	57	–8
Our Homeland Movement	332,487	5.88	6	307,064	5.71	0	6	New
Hungarian Two-Tailed Dog Party	185,052	3.27	0	126,648	2.36	0	0	0
Solution Movement	58,929	1.04	0	64,341	1.20	0	0	New
Party of Normal Life	39,720	0.70	0	31,495	0.59	0	0	New
National Self-Government of Germans	24,630	0.44	1				1	0
National Self-Government of Croats	1,760	0.03	0				0	0
National Self-Government of Slovaks	1,208	0.02	0				0	0
National Self-Government of Rusyns	645	0.01	0				0	0
National Self-Government of Romanians	526	0.01	0				0	0
National Self-Government of Serbs	418	0.01	0				0	0
National Self-Government of Ukrainians	396	0.01	0				0	0
National Self-Government of Poles	281	0.00	0				0	0
National Self-Government of Greeks	232	0.00	0				0	0
National Self-Government of Slovenes	219	0.00	0				0	0
National Self-Government of Armenians	163	0.00	0				0	0
National Self-Government of Bulgarians	157	0.00	0				0	0
Leftist Alliance				8,678	0.16	0	0	New
True Democratic Party				989	0.02	0	0	New
Civic Response				521	0.01	0	0	New
Our Party – IMA				326	0.01	0	0	New
Party of Greens				208	0.00	0	0	New
Democratic Organisation of the Poor and Workers				177	0.00	0	0	New
Hungarian Liberal Party (Note: Of three constituencal candidates from the party two ran within the United for Hungary as associate members.)				152	0.00	0	0	0
Independents				28,416	0.53	0	0	0
Total	5,654,860	100.00	93	5,376,142	100.00	106	199	0
Valid votes	5,654,860	99.00		5,376,142	98.80			
Invalid/blank votes	57,065	1.00		65,239	1.20			
Total votes	5,711,925	100.00		5,441,381	100.00			
Registered voters/turnout	8,215,304	69.53		7,703,191	70.64			
Source: National Electoral Commission, National Electoral Commission

=== Party list results by county and in the diaspora ===
Results by county: Fidesz: 40–50% 50–60% 60–70% United for Hungary: 40–50%

County	Fidesz–KDNP	EM	MH	MKKP	MEMO	NÉP	Turnout
Bács-Kiskun	57.25	29.66	7.58	3.08	1.01	0.81	67.5%
Baranya	49.67	36.08	5.93	3.54	0.93	0.86	67.5%
Békés	52.81	34.36	7.64	2.62	0.92	0.89	66.4%
Borsod-Abaúj-Zemplén	54.38	34.29	6.89	2.31	0.99	0.78	64.7%
Budapest	40.84	47.84	4.11	5.19	1.26	0.53	75.5%
Csongrád-Csanád	47.44	39.69	7.34	3.61	1.10	0.72	70.5%
Fejér	53.55	33.80	6.62	3.52	1.15	0.76	71.5%
Győr-Moson-Sopron	57.07	30.83	6.21	3.28	1.33	0.72	73.7%
Hajdú-Bihar	57.88	30.87	6.60	2.69	1.02	0.83	66.1%
Heves	54.98	33.37	7.31	2.50	0.97	0.74	69.0%
Jász-Nagykun-Szolnok	55.58	33.02	7.15	2.45	0.95	0.82	65.9%
Komárom-Esztergom	50.53	36.32	6.72	3.39	1.11	0.95	69.3%
Nógrád	59.00	29.27	7.66	2.15	0.80	0.68	66.9%
Pest	50.88	36.44	5.81	4.05	1.25	0.66	72.9%
Somogy	56.33	33.48	5.97	2.22	1.02	0.66	68.2%
Szabolcs-Szatmár-Bereg	61.66	29.04	5.59	1.64	0.91	0.80	65.4%
Tolna	58.95	28.49	6.67	2.46	0.90	0.81	68.8%
Vas	59.94	29.55	5.59	2.89	0.89	0.72	74.8%
Veszprém	52.57	34.44	6.88	3.39	1.00	0.76	71.8%
Zala	56.72	31.98	6.63	2.68	0.95	0.94	71.6%
Total in Hungary	52.45	36.15	6.15	3.42	1.10	0.73	70.21%
Diaspora	93.89	4.12	1.06	0.61	0.10	0.22	–
Total	54.13	34.44	5.88	3.27	1.04	0.70	69.59%

== Aftermath ==
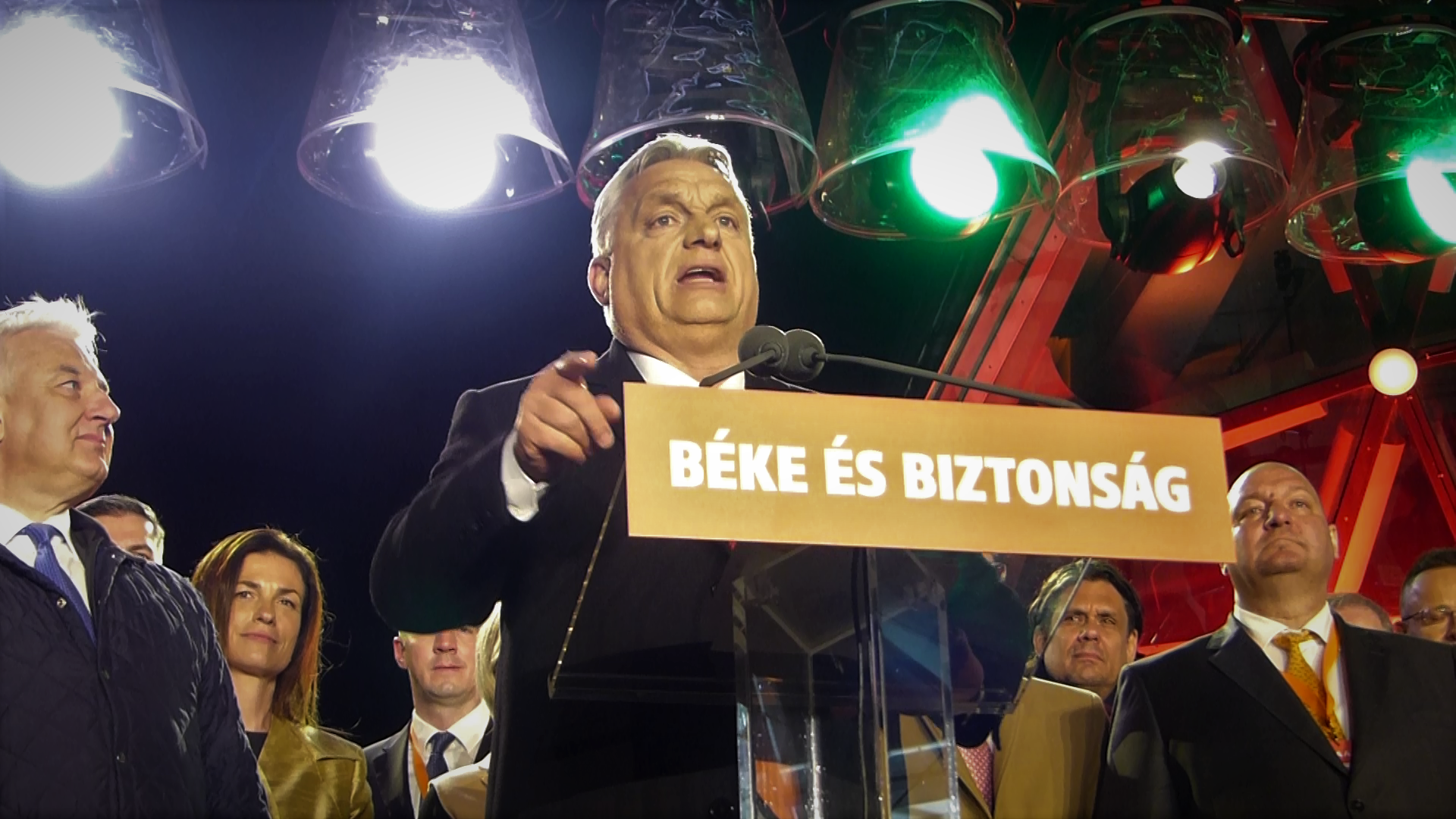
Viktor Orbán celebrating his victory

Hungary's incumbent prime minister Viktor Orbán, seeking a fourth consecutive term in office, declared victory on the night of the election once partial results showed Fidesz leading the vote by a wide margin. Addressing his supporters after these results, Orbán said: "We won a victory so big that you can see it from the moon, and you can certainly see it from Brussels." Orbán would go on to declare his victory as a rebuke against the Hungarian left, international media, George Soros, the "Brussels bureaucrats", and Volodymyr Zelenskyy. Opposition leader Péter Márki-Zay conceded the election shortly after Orbán's speech. Reuters described it as a "crushing victory", and that "voters endorsed his ambition of a conservative, 'illiberal' state and shrugged off concerns over Budapest's close ties with Moscow."

Although the election had been predicted to be closer than in previous years, Fidesz maintained a 5–6 percentage point lead in the polls leading up to the vote. The Organization for Security and Co-operation in Europe (OSCE) monitored the vote amid fears of electoral fraud. Preliminary results showed Fidesz was set to outperform polls, retain its supermajority, and control 135 seats of the 199-seat Hungarian Parliament, significantly ahead of the main opposition alliance United for Hungary, which was set to win 57 seats after 100% of the votes had been counted. The Mi Hazánk party also entered Parliament for the first time, winning 6 seats.

=== Analysis ===
Domestically, the degree of Fidesz's victory was attributed to Fidesz's influence over the domestic media landscape, voters' desire for stability during the ongoing Russian invasion of Ukraine, strong ideological differences within the main opposition coalition, the perception of Márki-Zay as inexperienced, and urban–rural political polarization. Some analysts claimed that the majority of Jobbik voters turned out for Fidesz or Mi Hazánk instead of the united opposition. Márki-Zay shared this assessment, admitting that the united opposition may have lost up to "two thirds" of Jobbik voters.

On the Hungarian left, there was disagreement about how to interpret the united opposition's defeat. DK leader Ferenc Gyurcsány and Jobbik leader Péter Jakab blamed Márki-Zay, while Bernadett Szél and Ákos Hadházy did not. Péter Ungár stated that while it was a "strategic mistake" for a centre-left alliance to nominate the conservative Márki-Zay, the united opposition's "elitist" rhetoric may have hurt it with rural voters even in traditionally left-leaning constituencies. Some opposition leaders even questioned whether forming a united front had been advantageous. Imre Komjáthi, a socialist MP, said that "the cracks and contradictions between our parties [in] ideology, technicalities, and resources had started to introduce coordination problems" during the election. He added that, in his view, the coalition had not been "genuine."

Politico predicted Orbán's victory would lead to further clashes between the Hungarian government and European Union institutions. Analysts found that Fidesz performed strongest in areas with high birthrates and with lower educational or economic attainment, while the united opposition did best in Budapest and in a few other urban areas.

=== Conduct ===
International observers' assessments of the electoral process were mixed. The OSCE monitoring mission evaluated that "the legal framework forms an adequate basis for democratic elections to be held, but a number of key aspects fall short of international standards." The OSCE added that the election day passed peacefully, with observers assessing the process as well-organized, orderly, and smooth. The monitoring mission further reported that the elections "offered voters distinct alternatives and were well run, but, while competitive, was marred by the pervasive overlapping of government and ruling coalition's messaging that blurred the line between state and party, as well as by media bias and opaque campaign funding." Human Rights Watch stated that the election was "marred by serious concerns about its fairness", adding that the "EU has responded insufficiently to the hollowing out of democracy and the rule of law in Hungary", while Freedom House described the election as neither free nor fair.

=== Anomalies over postal ballots ===
Since the 2014 parliamentary election, the right to vote is extended to Hungarian citizens, after a registration process, who do not have a permanent residence in Hungary (i.e. mostly the Hungarian diaspora in the neighboring countries, who have dual citizenship); however, they can only vote for the national list of Hungarian parties, so they do not have a chance to vote in individual constituencies. Unlike those Hungarians who have a Hungarian address but live abroad, the members of the Hungarian diaspora can cast their ballots by post without having to travel to an embassy or consulate. Critics say this method does not provide sufficient guarantees to prevent election fraud. Since 2014, the ruling party Fidesz–KDNP usually acquired more than 90 percent of the vote among the Hungarian diaspora.

Transtelex.ro, a Hungarian-language Romanian news portal revealed all possible frauds allowed by the legally undeveloped system. For instance, the registration process was not secure, as the data allowed a voter to register on behalf of another person and retrieve voting documents to any address. In the case of identification sheets, it was not possible to determine with absolute certainty whether it had actually been completed by the person whose name appears on it. As a result of a change in legislation in 2021, it was possible to return the vote without the posted security sealed envelope, therefore, there was no guarantee that the ballot paper had not been replaced. There were several reports that a person could also easily vote on behalf of their family members. Telex.hu reported a case that grandparents of a woman from Odorheiu Secuiesc, who resided in Budapest in the weeks of the election, filled her personal data and voted on her behalf. She said, "I have already been outraged that they have filled in the official paper and sent it for me, abusing my personal rights, but, in addition, they have voted for a party that I do not support because it represents an ideologically opposed position to me".

According to reports, the activists of the Fidesz-ally Alliance of Vojvodina Hungarians (VMSZ) delivered the ballot papers instead of the Pošta Srbije in Vojvodina, Serbia. News portal Szabad Magyar Szó reported that the party officials sent messages to the registered voters to come to the local offices of the VMSZ to cast their ballot there. In Transylvania, Romania, pro-Fidesz organizations and parties of the Hungarian minority, including the parliamentary party Democratic Alliance of Hungarians in Romania (UDMR or RMDSZ) also urged the registered voters to pass on their votes to them and not to entrust the postal service with the delivery of their ballot papers, because there is less chance that the vote will reach Hungary. In response, the Poșta Română complained against the call.

In the area between Livezeni and Târgu Mureș in Romania, a bag containing partially burnt Hungarian election postal ballot papers was found on illegal waste dump on 1 April 2022. Every ballot paper was filled out with votes for the opposition United for Hungary alliance or Our Homeland Movement. The National Election Office (NVI) and the Hungarian Civil Liberties Union (TASZ) filed a criminal complaint over the burnt ballot papers to the Hungarian Police. Péter Márki-Zay, prime minister-candidate of the United for Hungary, called on the annulment of all postal votes. Anna Orosz of the Momentum Movement demanded that the government ensure a level playing field for all Hungarian citizens voting abroad. Jobbik politician Dániel Z. Kárpát compared the scandal with the infamous "blue-ballot" election in 1947. The Fidesz blamed the United for Hungary for burning the ballot papers, saying "the desperate left-wing is capable of anything despicable". The Fidesz-ally UDMR also condemned the "accusations of election fraud", assuming "an organized provocation" against the ethnic Hungarian minority in Romania. The National Election Commission (NVB) announced on 3 April it will not investigate the issue of the discarded and burned postal ballots, because the election law only covers the territory of Hungary. The Curia of Hungary upheld the NVB's decision on 10 April 2022.

The ruling Fidesz acquired 93.91 percent of the mail votes, which accounted for 8% of all votes cast on the party's national list. This meant an extra mandate for Fidesz. The United for Hungary and the Our Homeland gained only 4.1 and 1.06 percent, respectively.

=== International responses ===
Heads of government and heads of state congratulating Orbán on his victory included Russian president Vladimir Putin, Czech president Miloš Zeman, Slovenian prime minister Janez Janša, Croatian prime minister Andrej Plenković, Kazakh president Kassym-Jomart Tokayev, Indian prime minister Narendra Modi, Albanian prime minister Edi Rama, Egyptian president Abdel Fattah el-Sisi, Israeli president Isaac Herzog, Turkish president Recep Tayyip Erdoğan, Bulgarian president Rumen Radev, Kyrgyz president Sadyr Japarov, Belarusian president Alexander Lukashenko, Serbian president Aleksandar Vučić, Slovak prime minister Eduard Heger, Chinese premier Li Keqiang, Austrian chancellor Karl Nehammer, and Czech prime minister Petr Fiala.

Other politicians and political parties to congratulate Orbán included Matteo Salvini, leader of Italy's Northern League and former deputy prime minister, Hunor Kelemen, leader of Romania's UDMR and deputy prime minister, Nigel Farage, former leader of United Kingdom's Brexit Party, former Slovak prime minister Robert Fico, former U.S. president Donald Trump, Marine Le Pen, leader of France's National Rally, Dutch Party for Freedom politician Geert Wilders, Milorad Dodik, the Serb member of the Presidency of Bosnia and Herzegovina, and the Spanish political party Vox. Reflecting ongoing tensions over Russian sanctions, Polish prime minister Mateusz Morawiecki was slightly more reserved but said that "regardless of [Poland's] relations with Hungary, we must note that the Fidesz-Christian Democrat alliance won its fourth consecutive election with the best possible results."

The European Council president Charles Michel congratulated Orbán, while the NATO Secretary General Jens Stoltenberg expressed "acknowledgment" of the results. Two days after the election, the European Commission president Ursula von der Leyen announced that the commission would begin cutting funding to Hungary over rule-of-law concerns. Hungarian government officials criticized the move as an attempt to "punish Hungarian voters".

== Gallery ==
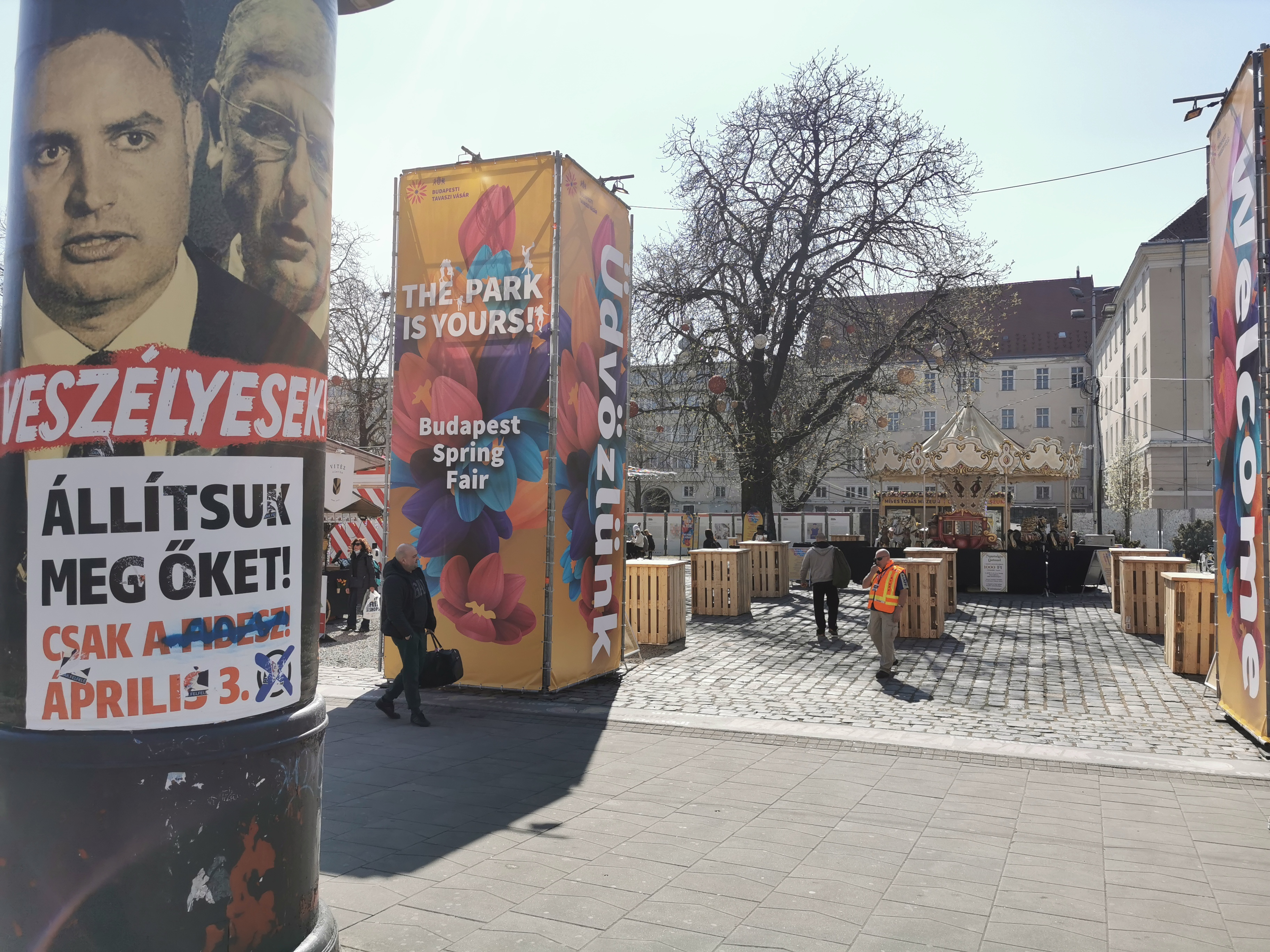
Election posters

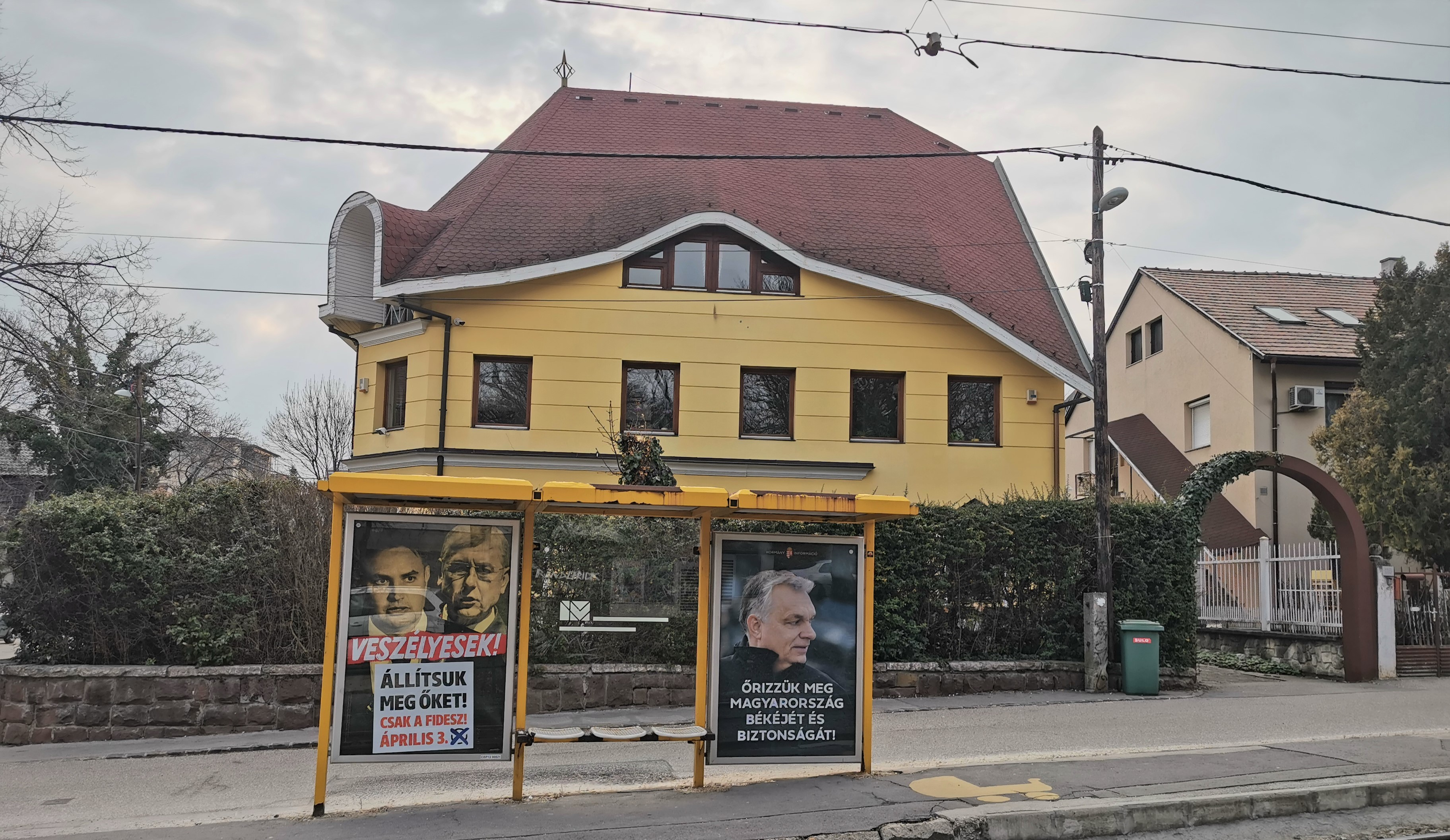
Election poster

== See also ==
- Fifth Orbán Government
- List of members of the National Assembly of Hungary (2022–2026)
