= 2018 protests in Hungary =

Anti-government demonstrations in Hungary

2018–2019 Hungarian protests
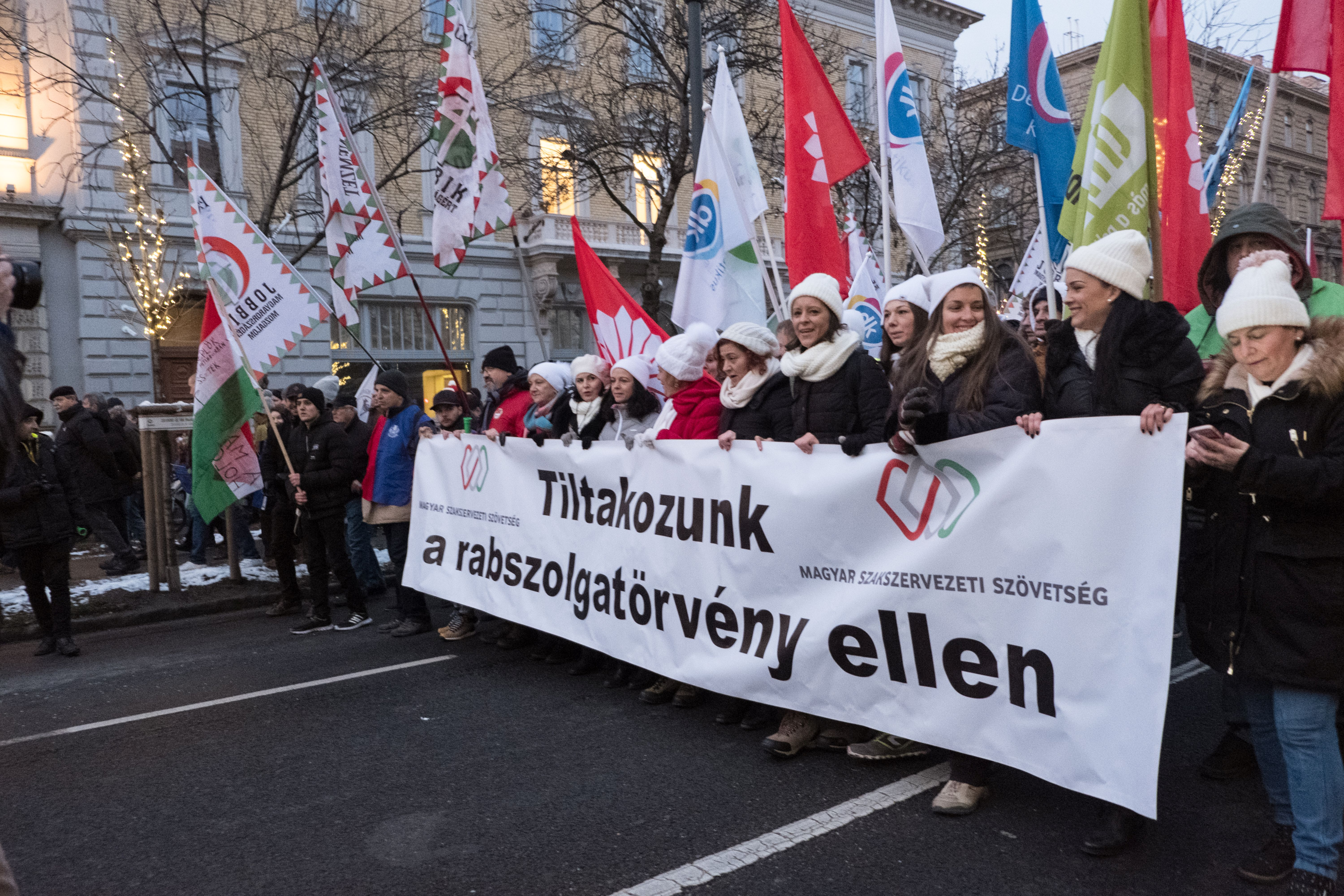
- Date: April 2018 – 7 September 2019
- Location: Budapest, Hungary
- Caused by: The "slave law" made by Fidesz government
- Goals: Repeal the law
- Result: Demands not met by the government

Parties
Hungarian opposition: Democratic Coalition; Hungarian Socialist Party; Jobbik; Politics Can Be Different; Dialogue for Hungary	Government of Hungary; Fidesz

Lead figures
Ferenc Gyurcsány; Gyula Molnár; Bertalan Tóth; Gábor Vona; László Lóránt Keresztes; Erzsébet Schmuck; Ákos Hadházy	(Hungary) Viktor Orbán (Hungary) János Áder (Hungary) Zsolt Semjén

The 2018 protests in Hungary were massive demonstrations and protests held against the government of Viktor Orbán and his cabinet, triggered by the so-called "slave law" in December of that year. The first wave of demonstrations began in April–May. The series of anti-government demonstrations in December 2018 was a political movement against the measures of the fourth Orbán government, the direct precedents of which were the submission of the Overtime Act and the scandalous parliamentary day on 12 December 2018. On this day, members of the Jobbik, MSZP, LMP, DK and Dialogue in Parliament disrupted the legislature by whistling, shouting, scattering paper and preventing access to the presidential pulpit, thereby obstructing the vote. Protests erupted against the vote and the parliamentary session.

== History ==
On 6 November 2018, Minister Zsolt Semjén submitted a bill on administrative courts.

On 20 November 2018, two representatives of Fidesz, Kristóf Szatmáry and Lajos Kósa, submitted an amendment to the Labor Code. At the sitting of 10 December 2018, the factions of the opposition parties tried to drag the debate with parliamentary obstruction to prevent a vote on the Overtime Act. Therefore, more than 2,900 amendments were tabled, on which the National Assembly should have voted one by one. However, following an opposition press conference on the obstruction, it was decided in the Judiciary Committee that the submitted motions could be voted on at the same time.

== Demonstrations ==
Mass protests and anti-Orbán protests were held by hundreds of thousands of demonstrators in April–May after corruption scandals arose. On the evening of the 12th of December, the news of the parliamentary scandal and the fact that the Office of the Parliament declared the voting of the laws to be regular, thousands of crowds gathered in Kossuth Square. The main demand was the repeal of the laws, but anti-government slogans were also voiced. Press reports highlight that both protesters and police have acted more violently than in previous anti-government demonstrations in recent years.

To keep the 12th spontaneous demonstration awake, several movements took place across the country, but large-scale demonstrations were organized mainly in the capital.

A protest against the Overtime Act was held on 13 December, demanding the independence of education and the judiciary. The crowd made a big circle from Kossuth Square over the Chain Bridge and the Margaret Bridge.

The typically peacefully marching crowd returned to Kossuth Square, where, however, a conflict arose with police officers defending the Parliament: some protesters threw the police line, to which the police responded with a tear gas-stick dispersal. At least five protesters, including the vice president of Momentum Movement, were produced at the event. During the evening, there were also major clashes between protesters and police officers at the EMMI building, the Western Railway Station, Oktogon and Király utca.

On 14 December, they also demonstrated in Pécs on Széchenyi Square, organized by the Momentum Movement, where Ákos Hadházy also spoke. Some protesters toss eggs in the Dunántúli Napló ("Transdanubian Diary") building merged into government media holding.

On 16 December 2018, Péter Tárkányi, a civil activist, "Merry Christmas, Prime Minister!" organized a demonstration entitled Jobbik, LMP, Momentum, MSZP, DK and Dialogue, among trade unions and opposition parties.

During the demonstration, a crowd of about 10-15 thousand people marched together from Heroes' Square to Kossuth Square. In parallel with the events in the capital, smaller and larger movements were organized in Debrecen, Sopron, Gyöngyös, Szeged, Békéscsaba, Győr, Miskolc and Veszprém.

The demonstration was reported on the M1 website, but not the mass gathering in front of the headquarters. One part of the protest crowd of about 2,500 threw the line of the assigned police during the movements, while another asked the tossers not to toss them.

Ákos Hadházy entered the MTVA building around 9 pm among several opposition members. Several representatives - Bernadett Szél, László Varju, István Ujhelyi, Lajos Korózs, Anett Bősz, Lajos Kepli, Ágnes Kunhalmi, Andrea Varga-Damm, Tibor Bana, Zsolt Gréczy, Bence Tordai - gave live telephone video coverage of the events; the number of viewers on Facebook live has occasionally exceeded 40,000.

The deputies referred to Act XXXVI of 2012 on the Parliament, according to which they have the right to enter the public institution to meet with the editor in charge.

The MTVA security chief did not deny entry, however, deputies were unable to meet with an editor. The protection of studios and editorial rooms by armed guards was justified on the grounds that the entry of Members into these areas would disrupt the proper functioning of the public institution. 13 opposition MPs spent the night in the headquarters to get the protesters to score 5 points.

On the morning of the 17th, a fight broke out between Hadházy and the MTVA security guards, and then Hadházy and Bernadett Szél were removed from the building. They filed a complaint. The head of MTVA initiated a property protection procedure at the clerk of Óbuda, which the clerk immediately initiated. Many are also demonstrations the increasing autocratic governing party.

== Further Protests ==
In January 2019, a series of anti-slave law and anti-government demonstrations was met with water cannon and protesters tossed tissue papers at police. After the violence, peaceful protests and small demonstrations have been held with no police presence or no interventions in the protests.

On 10 February, a protest was held in the capital Budapest against the government and the slave law. On 9 December, actors were on strike in a 2-day protest against a plan to control theatres. These protests were the biggest since January. 10,000 protesters marched demanding academic freedom on 23 October, the anniversary of the Hungarian Revolution of 1956. Thousands of university students protested on 7 September against the occupation of the national university. Thousands of young protesters marched on 25 July, protesting the invasion of the national broadcasting agency.

== See also ==
- Hungarian protests of 2011
- 2006 protests in Hungary
- 2014 Hungarian Internet tax protests
