= 2018 Hungarian parliamentary election =

- 8 April 2018

All 199 seats in the National Assembly 100 seats needed for a majority
- Opinion polls
- Turnout: 69.73% (▲8.00 pp)
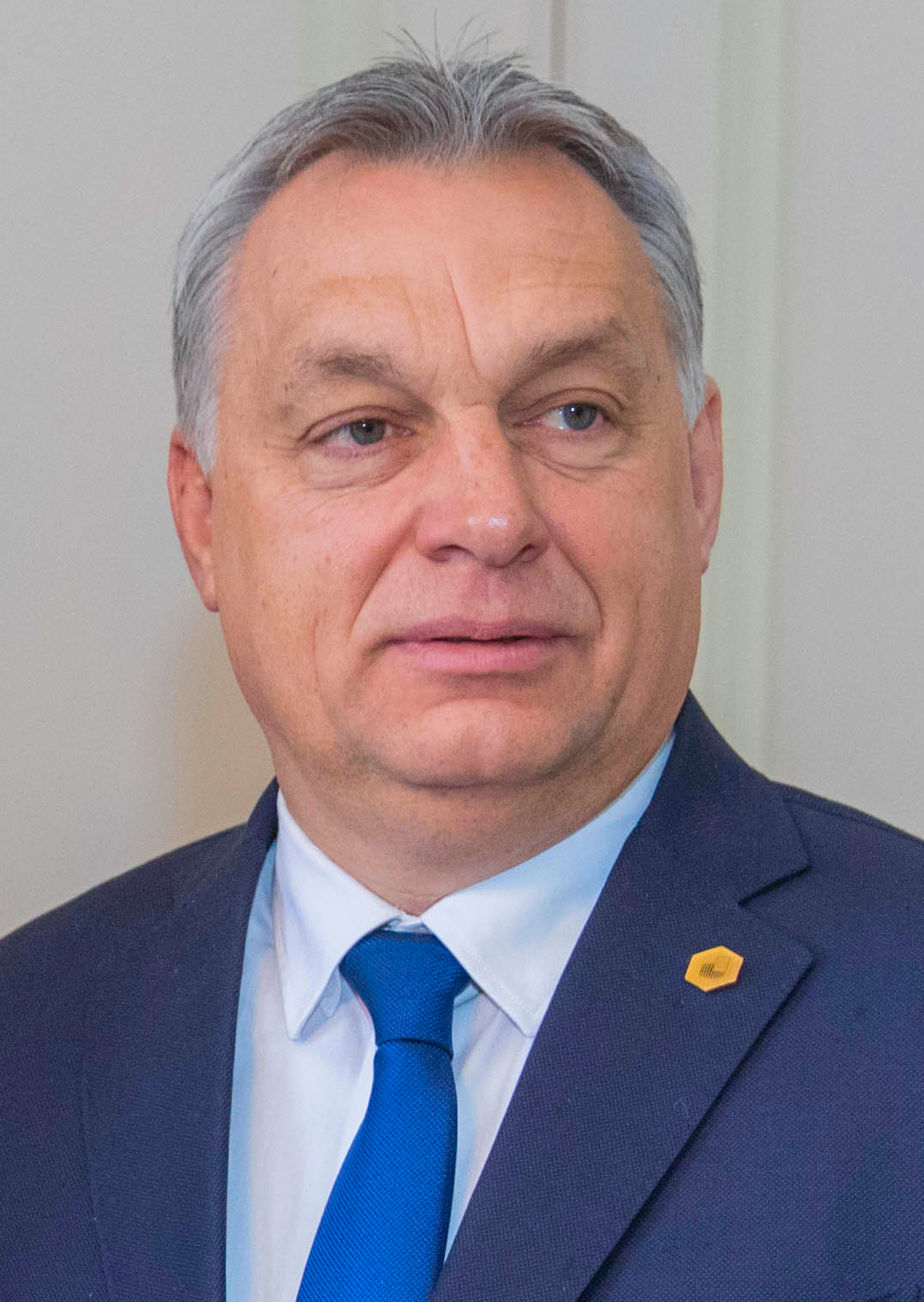

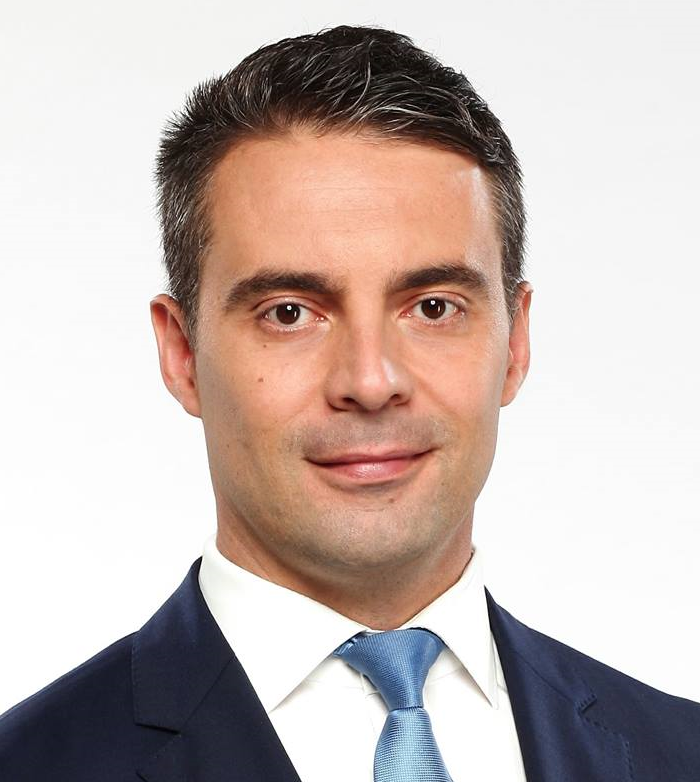

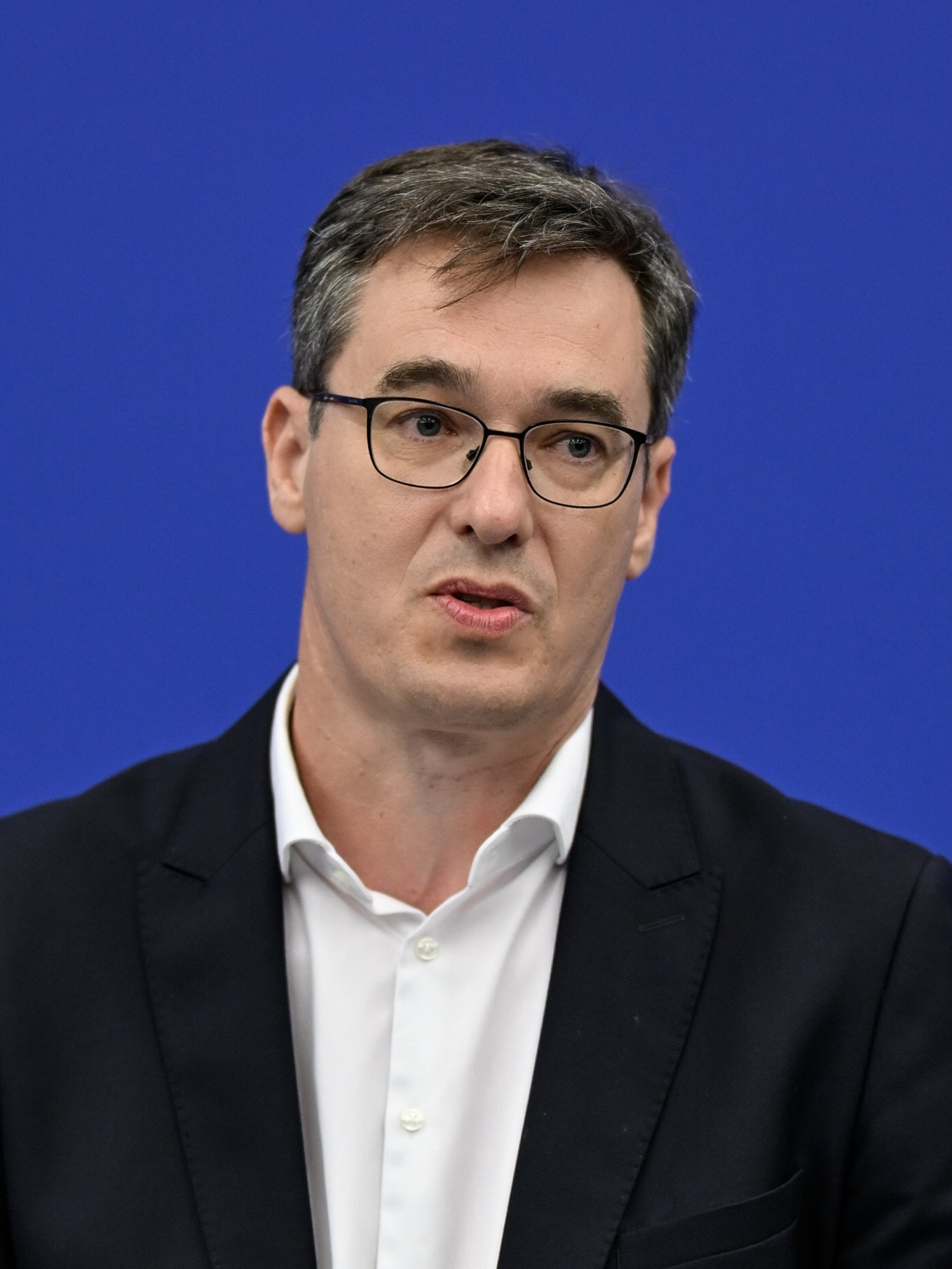

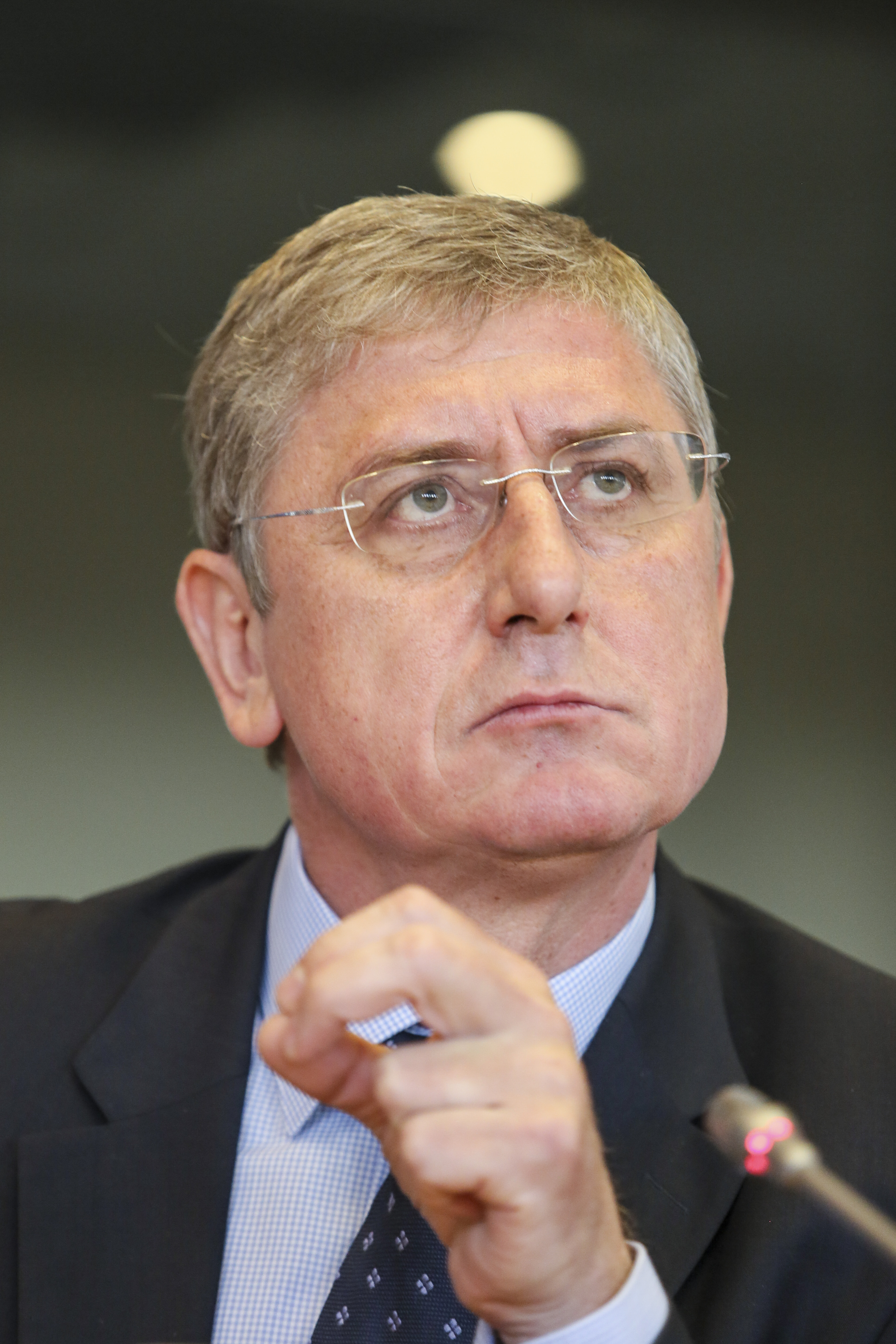

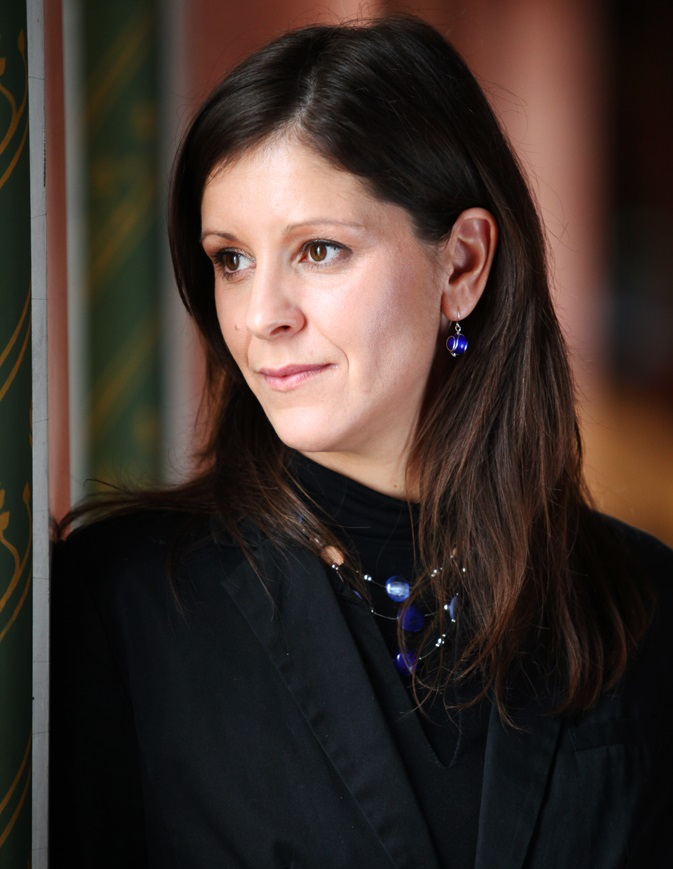

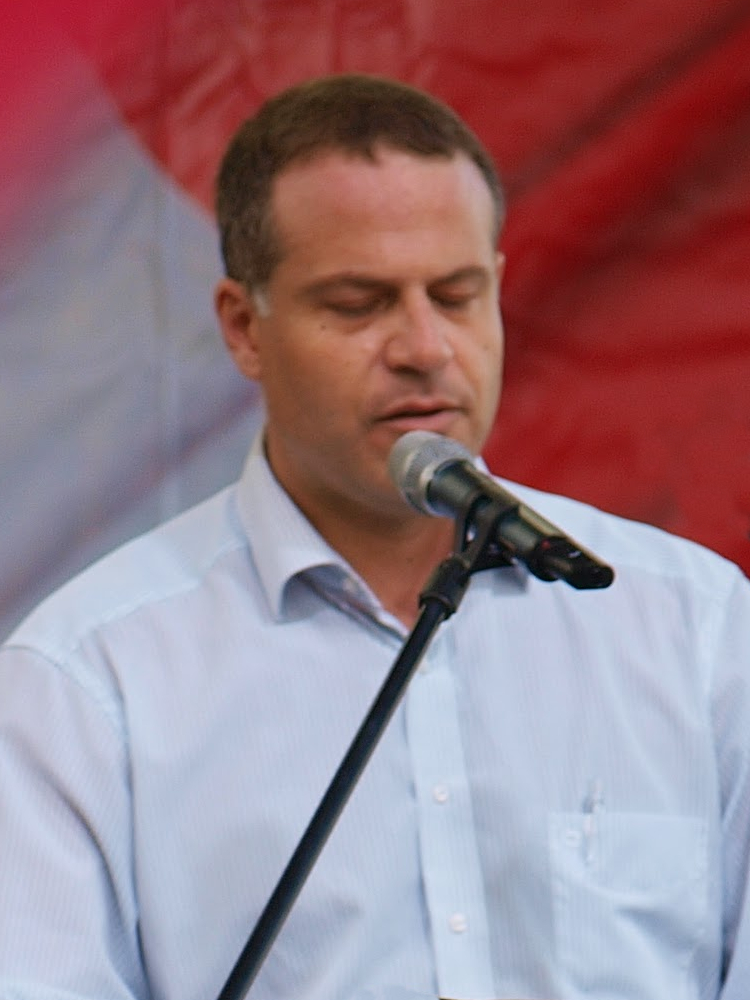
	First party	Second party	Third party
Leader	Viktor Orbán	Gábor Vona	Gergely Karácsony
Party	Fidesz	Jobbik	Párbeszéd
Alliance	Fidesz–KDNP		MSZP–Párbeszéd
Leader since	17 May 2003 (Note: As Fidesz leader.)	25 November 2006	12 December 2017 (Note: Karácsony was selected as the MSZP–Dialogue alliance's Prime Minister candidate on 12 December 2017. He had also served as co-leader of Dialogue since 15 June 2014.)
Last election	133 seats, 44.87%	23 seats, 20.22%	31 seats, 25.57% (Note: As a part of Összefogás.)
Seats won	133	26	20
Seat change	Steady	▲3	▼10
Constituency vote	2,636,201	1,276,840	622,458
%	47.89%	23.20%	11.31%
Party vote	2,824,551	1,092,806	682,701
% and swing	49.27% ▲4.40 pp	19.06% ▼1.16 pp	11.91% ▼13.66 pp (Note: Compared to the previous election as part of the Összefogás.)
	Fourth party	Fifth party	Sixth party
Leader	Ferenc Gyurcsány	Bernadett Szél	Péter Juhász
Party	DK	LMP	Együtt
Leader since	22 October 2011	4 September 2017 (Note: Szél was selected as the LMP's Prime Minister candidate on 4 September 2017. She had also served as co-president since 24 March 2013.)	4 February 2017
Last election	4 seats, 25.57%	5 seats, 5.34%	3 seats, 25.57%
Seats won	9	8	1
Seat change	▲5	▲3	▼2
Constituency vote	348,176	312,731	58,591
%	6.33%	5.68%	1.06%
Party vote	308,161	404,429	37,562
% and swing	5.38% ▼20.19 pp	7.06% ▲1.72 pp	0.66% ▼24.91 pp
- Results of the election. A darker shade indicates a higher vote share. Proportional list results are displayed in the top left.
Government before election
Third Orbán Government
Fidesz–KDNP
Government
Fourth Orbán Government
Fidesz–KDNP

Parliamentary elections were held in Hungary on 8 April 2018. The elections were the second since the adoption of a new constitution, which came into force on 1 January 2012.

The result was a victory for the Fidesz–KDNP alliance, preserving its two-thirds majority, with Viktor Orbán remaining Prime Minister. Orbán and Fidesz campaigned primarily on the issues of immigration and foreign meddling, and the election was seen as a victory for right-wing populism in Europe.

== Background ==
At the previous parliamentary election in April 2014, the incumbent government — composed of Fidesz and its satellite ally the KDNP — was able to achieve a two-thirds majority for the second consecutive time with 44.87 percent of the votes. According to their critics, this overwhelming proportion was only because of the new election law (mostly due to the introduction of compensation votes also for the individual winners) which was adopted by the ruling coalition in 2011. In early 2015, however, Fidesz lost its two-thirds majority following the 2014 Hungarian Internet tax protests and subsequent decrease in support for the government. The governing party suffered defeats at two parliamentary by-elections in February and April 2015, both in Veszprém County.

The left-wing electoral alliance Unity, which failed to win the 2014 national election after its five constituent parties gained a total of only 38 seats, broke up shortly thereafter. Its former member parties (MSZP, Együtt–PM and DK) participated in the May 2014 European Parliament election individually, while the MLP did not participate in the election at all. Due to this fragmentation of the left-wing opposition, the radical nationalist Jobbik became the second largest party in a nationwide election for the first time since its establishment. The PM broke off the permanent nature of its alliance with Együtt on 9 November 2014.

After a few months of crisis for Fidesz from November 2014, which was marked by internal conflicts (e.g. businessman Lajos Simicska's fall from grace within Fidesz) and corruption allegations, the governing party regained much of its lost support during the European migrant crisis during the summer of 2015, when Prime Minister Viktor Orbán announced the construction of a 4-metre-high (13 ft), 175-kilometre-long (109 mi) fence along its southern border with Serbia. The Hungarian government also criticised the official European Union policy for not dissuading migrants from entering Europe. The barrier became successful, as from 17 October 2015 onward, thousands of migrants were diverted daily to Slovenia instead.

On 13 December 2015, the 26th congress of the ruling Fidesz re-elected Viktor Orbán as party leader. Orbán said in his speech that he was ready to lead the party into the forthcoming parliamentary election and to continue to serve as prime minister if Fidesz won re-election in 2018. With that statement, Orbán made clear that he did not intend to become President of Hungary in succession to János Áder during the 2017 indirect presidential election.

On 2 October 2017, the elected leader of the MSZP, László Botka, announced his withdrawal, saying that he thought some of the Hungarian opposition did not care about changing government.

Orbán and Fidesz's strength going into the election came into question when the party unexpectedly lost a mayoral by-election in Hódmezővásárhely, considered a Fidesz stronghold, on 25 February 2018, to an independent candidate supported by every opposition party. Election observers and critics of Orbán speculated whether Hungary's opposition parties could create a similar alliance on the national level, though the opposition parties had been unable to create a common strategy by late March 2018. Orbán increased his efforts as a result of this loss.

According to observers prior to the election, winning re-election was seen as more difficult for Orbán than expected.

== Electoral system ==
The 199 members of the National Assembly were elected by two methods; 106 were elected in single-member constituencies by first-past-the-post voting, with the remaining 93 elected from a single nationwide constituency mostly by proportional representation, via a partially compensatory system (a hybrid of parallel voting and the mixed single vote). The electoral threshold was set at 5%, although this was raised to 10% for coalitions of two parties and 15% for coalitions of three or more parties. Seats were allocated using the d'Hondt method.

Since 2014, each of the Armenian, Bulgarian, Croatian, German, Greek, Polish, Romani, Romanian, Rusyn, Serbian, Slovak, Slovenian, and Ukrainian ethnic minorities can win one of the 93 party lists seats if they register as a specific lists and reach a lowered quota of $\frac{1}{4 \times 93}=\frac{1}{372}\approx0.2688\%$ of the total of party list votes. Each minority is able to send a minority spokesman – without the rights of an MP – to the National Assembly, if the list does not reach this lowered quota.

== Opinion polls ==
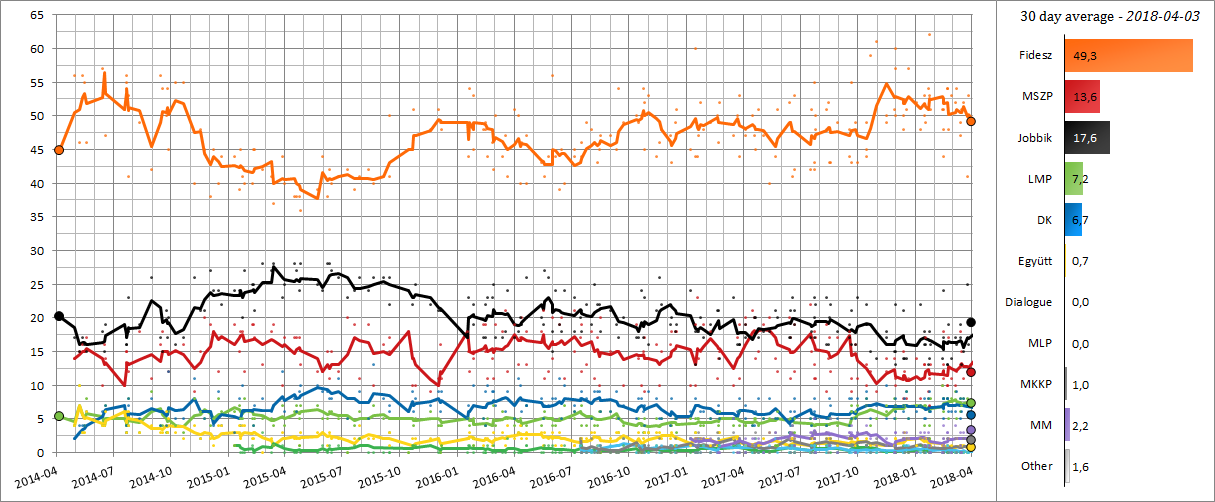
The polls are from April 2014 (the last parliamentary election) up to the current date. Each coloured line specifies a political party. Missing data by Századvég about MKKP and MM were counted in the average as 0.

== Candidates ==
=== Individual candidates ===
The following table contains a selected list of numbers of individual candidates by county representation and party affiliation:

Individual candidates
County	Seats	Fidesz–KDNP	Jobbik	LMP	MM	ÖP	MIÉP	MP	MSZP–Párbeszéd	DK	MKKP	Együtt
Budapest	18	18	18	15	13	1	7	11	8	7	12	3
Baranya	4	4	4	4	3	3	3	2	1	2	3	2
Bács-Kiskun	6	6	6	6	6	3	2	3	4	2	1	0
Békés	4	4	4	4	4	4	3	1	2	2	1	1
Borsod-Abaúj-Zemplén	7	7	7	6	5	7	7	6	4	3	0	4
Csongrád	4	4	4	4	3	2	1	1	3	1	3	2
Fejér	5	5	5	5	3	5	3	4	2	3	0	1
Győr-Moson-Sopron	5	5	5	5	4	5	1	2	3	2	2	1
Hajdú-Bihar	6	6	6	6	6	4	6	5	4	2	1	3
Heves	3	3	3	3	1	3	1	0	2	1	1	1
Jász-Nagykun-Szolnok	4	4	4	4	4	4	4	4	2	2	1	1
Komárom-Esztergom	3	3	3	3	2	1	2	2	2	1	3	0
Nógrád	2	2	2	2	1	1	1	2	1	1	1	1
Pest	12	12	12	11	9	5	8	8	6	4	5	6
Somogy	4	4	4	4	2	3	0	1	2	2	0	2
Szabolcs-Szatmár-Bereg	6	6	6	6	6	5	6	3	3	3	1	1
Tolna	3	3	3	3	2	2	1	1	1	1	1	0
Vas	3	3	3	3	3	3	1	0	2	1	1	0
Veszprém	4	4	4	3	3	4	0	1	2	1	2	0
Zala	3	3	3	3	3	1	0	0	1	2	0	1
All	106	106	106	100	83	66	57	57	55	43	39	30

=== National lists ===
Under the election law, parties which ran individual candidates in at least 27 constituencies in Budapest and at least nine counties had the opportunity to set up a national list. The following table contains only the incumbent parliamentary parties' national lists (first 20 members), which were able to secure mandates:

Party (national) lists
Fidesz–KDNP (279)	Jobbik (184)	MSZP–Párbeszéd (220)	LMP (128)	DK (145)
1. Viktor Orbán (Fidesz); 2. Zsolt Semjén (KDNP); 3. László Kövér (Fidesz); 4. Katalin Novák (Fidesz); 5. Mihály Varga (Fidesz); 6. Gergely Gulyás (Fidesz); 7. Gábor Kubatov (Fidesz); 8. Szilárd Németh (Fidesz); 9. Zoltán Balog (Fidesz); 10. Péter Harrach (KDNP); 11. Sándor Lezsák (Fidesz); 12. István Jakab (Fidesz); 13. Balázs Győrffy (Fidesz); 14. Béla Turi-Kovács (Fidesz); 15. Kristóf Szatmáry (Fidesz); 16. László Böröcz (Fidesz); 17. Flórián Farkas (Fidesz); 18. Márta Mátrai (Fidesz); 19. Zsolt Németh (Fidesz); 20. István Bajkai (Fidesz)	1. Gábor Vona; 2. János Volner; 3. Dóra Dúró; 4. Ádám Steinmetz; 5. Andrea Varga-Damm; 6. Dániel Z. Kárpát; 7. Tamás Sneider; 8. Ádám Mirkóczki; 9. Erik Fülöp; 10. Dávid Janiczak; 11. Márton Gyöngyösi; 12. Gergely Farkas; 13. Gábor Staudt; 14. György Szilágyi; 15. Péter Jakab; 16. Enikő Hegedűs; 17. István Szávay; 18. László Lukács; 19. Balázs Ander; 20. Tibor Bana	1. Gergely Karácsony (P); 2. Gyula Molnár (MSZP); 3. István Hiller (MSZP); 4. Ágnes Kunhalmi (MSZP); 5. Bertalan Tóth (MSZP); 6. Zoltán Gőgös (MSZP); 7. József Tóbiás (MSZP); 8. Attila Mesterházy (MSZP); 9. Zsolt Molnár (MSZP); 10. Zita Gurmai (MSZP); 11. Bence Tordai (P); 12. Lajos Korózs (MSZP); 13. László Varga (MSZP); 14. Ildikó Bangó-Borbély (MSZP); 15. Anett Bősz (MSZP); 16. Tamás Harangozó (MSZP); 17. András Nemény (MSZP); 18. László Szakács (MSZP); 19. Márta V. Naszályi (MSZP); 20. Csaba Tóth (MSZP)	1. Bernadett Szél; 2. Ákos Hadházy; 3. György Gémesi; 4. Erzsébet Schmuck; 5. Péter Ungár; 6. László Lóránt Keresztes; 7. Márta Demeter; 8. Máté Kanász-Nagy; 9. Szilvia Lengyel; 10. Gábor Üveges; 11. István Ferenczi; 12. Krisztina Hohn; 13. Júlia Ábrahám; 14. Kálmán Kis-Szeniczey; 15. Róbert Benedek Sallai; 16. Virág Ecseki; 17. István Ikotity; 18. Antal Csárdi; 19. Mária Hajdu; 20. János Kendernay	1. Ferenc Gyurcsány; 2. Csaba Molnár; 3. Ágnes Vadai; 4. Péter Niedermüller; 5. László Varju; 6. Lajos Oláh; 7. Sándor Székely; 8. Zsolt Gréczy; 9. Attila Ara-Kovács; 10. Imre László; 11. Gergely Arató; 12. László Sebián-Petrovszki; 13. Erzsébet Gy. Németh; 14. Zoltán Varga; 15. József Debreczeni; 16. Judit Ráczné Földi; 17. Tibor Nagy-Huszein; 18. Erik Konczer; 19. József Binszki; 20. Zoltán Nagy

== Campaign ==
The Breaking Point Poster (depicting a photograph of Syrian refugees near the Croatia-Slovenia border in 2015), that was used during the 2016 UK Brexit referendum, was used in an anti-immigration advertisement by the Hungarian Fidesz party, published on 26 March 2018, This poster added a large red stop sign graphic over the photograph.

In March 2018 just before the election, Fidesz János Lázár posted an anti immigration video about Vienna. On the video he said that migrants made Vienna dirty and poor and that in 20 years, Hungary's Budapest could look like Vienna if the Hungarian opposition won the elections.

A Fidesz party poster featured George Soros and rival candidates (Bernadett Szél, Ferenc Gyurcsány, Gábor Vona and Gergely Karácsony) holding bolt cutters after having cut the Hungarian border fence behind them.

== Results ==
Turnout (within Hungary only, excluding eligible voters abroad)
7:00	9:00	11:00	13:00	15:00	17:00	18:30	Overall
2.24%	13.17%	29.93%	42.32%	53.64%	63.21%	68.13%	70.22%

Party	Party-list			Constituency			Total seats	+/–
Party	Votes	%	Seats	Votes	%	Seats	Total seats	+/–
Fidesz–KDNP	2,824,551	49.27	42	2,636,201	47.89	91	133	0
Jobbik	1,092,806	19.06	25	1,276,840	23.20	1	26	+3
Hungarian Socialist Party–Dialogue for Hungary	682,701	11.91	12	622,458	11.31	8	20	–11
Politics Can Be Different	404,429	7.06	7	312,731	5.68	1	8	+3
Democratic Coalition	308,161	5.38	6	348,176	6.33	3	9	+5
Momentum Movement	175,229	3.06	0	75,033	1.36	0	0	New
Hungarian Two Tailed Dog Party	99,414	1.73	0	39,763	0.72	0	0	New
Together	37,562	0.66	0	58,591	1.06	1	1	–2
National Self-Government of Germans	26,477	0.46	1				1	+1
Hungarian Workers' Party	15,640	0.27	0	13,613	0.25	0	0	0
Family Party	10,641	0.19	0	9,839	0.18	0	0	0
Hungarian Justice and Life Party	8,712	0.15	0	6,897	0.13	0	0	0
Party for a Fit and Healthy Hungary	7,309	0.13	0	5,523	0.10	0	0	0
National Self-Government of Gypsies	5,703	0.10	0				0	0
Tenni Akarás Mozgalom	5,312	0.09	0	1,177	0.02	0	0	New
Gypsy Party of Hungary	4,109	0.07	0	3,700	0.07	0	0	0
Common Ground	3,894	0.07	0	3,319	0.06	0	0	New
For Hungary's Poor People	3,048	0.05	0	3,283	0.06	0	0	New
We need Cooperation Party	2,722	0.05	0	2,659	0.05	0	0	New
Iránytű	2,001	0.03	0	1,679	0.03	0	0	New
National Self-Government of Croats	1,743	0.03	0				0	0
Order Party	1,708	0.03	0	1,416	0.03	0	0	0
Unity Party	1,407	0.02	0	3,167	0.06	0	0	0
Medete Party	1,292	0.02	0	2,166	0.04	0	0	New
National Self-Government of Slovaks	1,245	0.02	0				0	New
Democratic Party for the Betterment of European Roma Christians	1,003	0.02	0	1,471	0.03	0	0	0
Net Party	1,100	0.02	0	713	0.01	0	0	New
National Self-Government of Rusyns	539	0.01	0				0	New
National Self-Government of Hungarian Romanians	428	0.01	0				0	0
National Self-Government of Serbs	296	0.01	0				0	0
National Self-Government of Ukrainians	270	0.00	0				0	0
National Self-Government of Poles	210	0.00	0				0	0
National Self-Government of Slovenes	199	0.00	0				0	0
National Authority of Hungarian Churches	159	0.00	0				0	0
National Self-Government of Armenians	159	0.00	0				0	0
National Self-Government of Bulgarians	104	0.00	0				0	0
The Motherland Party				1,980	0.04	0	0	0
Democratic Party				1,679	0.03	0	0	New
Independent Smallholders' Party				1,580	0.03	0	0	0
Lendülettel				1,377	0.03	0	0	New
Miszep				1,158	0.02	0	0	New
Go Hungary!				1,120	0.02	0	0	New
Értünk Értetek				1,033	0.02	0	0	New
ÚMF				780	0.01	0	0	New
Nation and Peace				767	0.01	0	0	New
Modern Hungary Movement				617	0.01	0	0	New
OP				613	0.01	0	0	New
SZP				554	0.01	0	0	New
Democratic Party for Hungary				498	0.01	0	0	New
IMA				477	0.01	0	0	New
MINŐKP				411	0.01	0	0	New
NEEM				350	0.01	0	0	New
TAMP				344	0.01	0	0	New
EMMO				316	0.01	0	0	New
HHP				255	0.00	0	0	New
DMP				248	0.00	0	0	New
EP				244	0.00	0	0	0
JÓ ÚT MPP				226	0.00	0	0	New
AQP				192	0.00	0	0	0
ECDP				187	0.00	0	0	New
Everyone's Homeland				180	0.00	0	0	New
ERP				169	0.00	0	0	New
ÉBMP				168	0.00	0	0	New
Hungarian Democratic Union				149	0.00	0	0	New
OCP				125	0.00	0	0	New
KEDN				118	0.00	0	0	New
Opre Roma				114	0.00	0	0	New
MMM				104	0.00	0	0	New
FITIP				91	0.00	0	0	New
JMP				64	0.00	0	0	New
National Greens				53	0.00	0	0	New
Oxygen Party				37	0.00	0	0	New
Civil Movement				35	0.00	0	0	New
KPP				35	0.00	0	0	New
HAM				22	0.00	0	0	New
NOP				18	0.00	0	0	0
EU Alternative				15	0.00	0	0	New
Independents				55,612	1.01	1	1	+1
Total	5,732,283	100.00	93	5,504,530	100.00	106	199	0
Valid votes	5,732,283	98.97		5,504,530	98.92			
Invalid/blank votes	59,585	1.03		59,880	1.08			
Total votes	5,791,868	100.00		5,564,410	100.00			
Registered voters/turnout	8,312,173	69.68		7,933,815	70.14			
Source: National Election Office, Election Resources

=== Party list results by county and in the diaspora ===
Results by county: Fidesz: 30–40% 40–50% 50–60%

County	Fidesz–KDNP	Jobbik	MSZP-Párbeszéd	LMP	DK	Momentum	Együtt	Others
Bács-Kiskun	53.97	19.78	9.37	6.34	4.07	2.65	0.34	3.47
Baranya	43.68	19.37	12.08	8.16	6.34	2.72	0.63	7.00
Békés	48.01	23.58	11.28	5.98	4.67	2.37	0.42	3.70
Borsod-Abaúj-Zemplén	45.62	26.52	12.75	4.88	4.62	1.77	0.31	3.52
Budapest	38.15	12.93	18.06	10.84	8.65	5.75	1.65	3.97
Csongrád	45.54	19.68	15.21	7.82	4.11	3.25	0.62	3.75
Fejér	49.10	21.78	10.02	6.63	5.49	3.03	0.45	3.48
Győr-Moson-Sopron	54.18	17.43	9.65	7.19	4.68	3.06	0.37	3.42
Hajdú-Bihar	51.23	21.30	10.73	6.11	4.25	2.70	0.48	3.19
Heves	47.33	27.53	10.04	5.07	4.96	2.03	0.31	2.70
Jász-Nagykun-Szolnok	48.49	26.39	10.55	5.07	4.23	1.96	0.32	2.97
Komárom-Esztergom	44.52	23.02	11.31	7.31	6.45	2.66	0.39	4.31
Nógrád	50.78	21.28	12.24	5.03	4.75	1.51	0.32	4.06
Pest	46.21	19.09	11.32	8.92	5.80	3.55	0.80	4.28
Somogy	49.92	23.61	10.37	5.28	5.49	2.12	0.43	2.80
Szabolcs-Szatmár-Bereg	54.16	22.41	11.15	3.80	3.82	1.67	0.30	2.70
Tolna	53.64	17.66	10.09	7.15	4.59	2.08	0.31	4.46
Vas	57.77	15.02	11.14	6.31	3.93	2.48	0.38	2.98
Veszprém	50.80	20.64	11.01	6.16	4.77	2.52	0.43	3.64
Zala	52.45	20.76	9.89	6.29	5.20	2.48	0.36	2.58
Total in Hungary	47.36	19.81	12.37	7.31	5.58	3.16	0.68	3.74
Diaspora	96.24	0.91	0.55	0.93	0.30	0.45	0.14	0.49
Total	49.27	19.06	11.91	7.06	5.38	3.06	0.66	3.61

== Reactions ==
Following his election defeat, Gábor Vona, chairman of Jobbik, tendered his resignation. The entire Socialist leadership also resigned.

Orbán was congratulated by German Chancellor Angela Merkel, Polish Prime Minister Mateusz Morawiecki, Czech Prime Minister Andrej Babiš, Israeli Prime Minister Benjamin Netanyahu, European Council President Donald Tusk, British foreign minister Boris Johnson and Former Canadian prime minister Stephen Harper. In addition, numerous hard-right and far-right European leaders, including Marine Le Pen, Geert Wilders, Beatrix von Storch, Vice Chancellor of Austria Heinz-Christian Strache, Matteo Salvini, Alexander Gauland, Alice Weidel, and Nigel Farage, congratulated Orbán's election victory. German Interior Minister Horst Seehofer also reacted positively at the election results. U.S. President Donald Trump congratulated Orbán's election victory in a June 2018 phone conversation.

On 14 April 2018, "tens of thousands" of Hungarians protested Orbán's election victory in Budapest. According to Bloomberg News, the protests illustrated the divide in Hungarian society that existed despite Orbán's victory. Another large protest occurred the following week.

=== Analysis ===
According to The Washington Post the election was "easily the most consequential since Hungary’s post-communist transition", and it "represented a victory for the European far right". Orbán campaigned exclusively on his opposition to immigration and foreign meddling and his victory was seen as a boost for his Eurosceptic and nationalist policies as well as for other right-wing populist governments and political parties across Europe, such as in Austria and Poland. The election results strengthened Orbán's position over Hungarian politics, giving his party the ability to change Hungary's constitution again, and they were seen as a setback to the European Union along with a string of other elections throughout Europe.

The election saw a large surge in voter turnout, one of the largest in post-communist Hungarian history, which benefited Fidesz despite pre-election expectations that it would help the opposition. Fidesz significantly outperformed its election result expectations, but was reported to have lost support among younger voters. There was also a geographical split in the results, with opposition parties winning the majority of seats in Budapest, while provincial towns and rural areas were predominantly won by the Fidesz coalition. Despite this, The Washington Post described the results as "a crushing defeat for left-leaning opposition leaders".

According to Zselyke Csaky of Foreign Policy, Orbán won partially because of a growing Hungarian economy, his centralization of power over the previous eight years, and "the brutally effective propaganda campaign he has waged against all enemies". According to Shaun Walker of The Guardian, Orbán's opposition to immigration and "a coordinated, expensive and sophisticated sting operation" by the Hungarian government on various NGOs contributed to his victory.

The election was also notable for seeing a representative of Hungary's German minority be elected for the first time since 1933.

=== Electoral conduct ===
A preliminary report on the election by the Organization for Security and Co-operation in Europe (OSCE) criticised the electoral conduct and stated that Fidesz used government resources for its election campaign. A spokesman described campaigning language as "quite hostile and xenophobic". The report criticised the atmosphere as limiting wide-ranging debate and found that public television broadcasts were biased towards the governing coalition. It also criticised the use of "information campaigns" funded out of public money, which it stated generated "a pervasive overlap between state and ruling party resources, undermining contestants' ability to compete on an equal basis".

== Government formation ==
On 12 April 2018, cabinet member Antal Rogán announced TV2 that "there will be a new government formed, mostly with new members and a new structure", in line with the government's new priorities, including demography and family policy and migrant issue. On 20 April, Orbán said "I would say that people not voted for the continuation of the work of the present government, but they want no change in the service of the goals". There he announced the replacement of János Lázár as Minister of the Prime Minister's Office, one of the most influential members of his former cabinets, and confirmed Mihály Varga will remain minister responsible for economy. He called solving demographic problems as the government's most important task. On 23 April, Zoltán Balog announced, he will step down as Minister of Human Resources, disagreeing with the prime minister over structural considerations, who intended to keep the type of superministry system. Balog will lead the Fidesz's Foundation for Civic Hungary. Next day, Sándor Fazekas also said that he will not continue his work as Minister of Agriculture after eight years. On 25 April, minister without portfolio Lajos Kósa announced he will leave the government, as Orbán entrusted him to lead the Fidesz campaign for the upcoming local elections in 2019. On the same day, the online version of ATV reported that Minister of Defence István Simicskó also left the government, and will be replaced by "a general".

Senior press officer Bertalan Havasi announced the compilation of the government on 27 April, which largely confirmed previous unofficial information. Accordingly, the name of the Ministry of National Economy was restored to Ministry of Finance, which existed before 2010. The Ministry of National Development abolished and its duties were distributed: Andrea Bártfai-Mager was appointed minister without portfolio for managing national wealth and László Palkovics became head of the newly formed Ministry of National Innovation and Technology, while energy issues were assigned to the Prime Minister's Office. The Ministry of Agriculture was renamed from "Földművelésügyi Minisztérium" to "Agrárminisztérium" with no change in the scope of operations. Seven members of Orbán's third cabinet – Zsolt Semjén, Antal Rogán, Péter Szijjártó, Sándor Pintér, László Trócsányi, Mihály Varga and János Süli – retained their positions. Miklós Kásler, the Director of the National Institute of Oncology was appointed Minister of Human Resources, while incumbent Secretary of State for Agriculture István Nagy replaced his superior Sándor Fazekas. Fidesz caucus leader Gergely Gulyás became the new Minister of the Prime Minister's Office, but the evolving Prime Minister's Government Office under the direct management of Viktor Orbán has reduced his powers. Col. Gen. Tibor Benkő, who has served as Chief of the General Staff since 2010 was nominated to the position of Minister of Defence, becoming the first active military officer since the end of communism, who held the ministry.

On 10 May, the new Hungarian Parliament elected Orbán to a fourth term. Orbán's new cabinet was then sworn in on 18 May.

== See also ==
- List of members of the National Assembly of Hungary (2018–22)
- Breaking Point Poster
