= Máté Kanász-Nagy =

Hungarian politician

Leader of LMP – Hungary's Green Party
- In office 30 August 2020 – 27 August 2022 Serving with Erzsébet Schmuck
- Preceded by: János Kendernay
- Succeeded by: Péter Ungár

Member of the National Assembly
- Incumbent
- Assumed office 2 May 2022

Personal details
- Born: 3 October 1986 (age 40)
- Party: Greens (2010–present)
- Education: Eötvös Loránd University

Máté Kanász-Nagy (born 3 October 1986) is a Hungarian politician, who has been a member of the National Assembly since 2022. He was the male co-leader of the LMP – Hungary's Green Party from 2020 to 2022, serving with the female co-leader Erzsébet Schmuck.

== Career ==
Kanász-Nagy has been living in Újpest since he was three years old. He graduated in 2010 as a sociologist at Eötvös Loránd University. He has been an active party member since 2010 in the newly formed LMP. In 2011, he worked as a consultant for the Possible Other in the Politics Group. In 2015 He became the LMP Youth spokesman, and from 2017 he continued as the spokesman of the LMP. In May 2018, the Congress of the LMP in Székesfehérvár elected him the Secretary of the National Presidency of the LMP.

He ran in several municipal elections in Újpest. In November 2014, the LMP launched a campaign in the Újpest by-elections, led by Kanász-Nagy. In the 2018 parliamentary elections in Hungary, he was the LMP's candidate in the 11th OEVK in Budapest and 8th on the LMP's national list.

In the 2019 local elections, he was elected as an individual district representative to the Újpest District Assembly. He was elected as the deputy mayor of Újpest responsible for public welfare affairs by the majority of the assembly.

On 30 August 2020, the Fiftieth Congress of LMP elected him to be the male co-leader of the party, replacing János Kendernay. Kanász-Nagy was elected a Member of Parliament via the joint electoral list of the United for Hungary in the 2022 parliamentary election. He became a member of the Legislative Committee. Kanász-Nagy did not run for the presidency in the August 2022 party leadership electoral congress. He was replaced as male co-chair by Péter Ungár.

Party political offices
Preceded by János Kendernay; Erzsébet Schmuck	Co-President of the LMP – Hungary's Green Party alongside Erzsébet Schmuck; 2020–2022	Succeeded by Péter Ungár; Erzsébet Schmuck
