= Gábor Scheiring =

Hungarian economist and politician

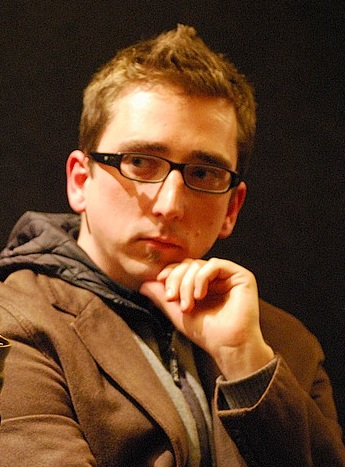

Member of the National Assembly
- In office 14 May 2010 – 5 May 2014

Personal details
- Born: 14 March 1981 (age 45) Budapest, Hungary
- Party: LMP (2009–2013); PM (2013– )
- Education: Corvinus University of Budapest; Hughes Hall, Cambridge
- Profession: economist

Gábor Scheiring (born 14 March 1981) is a Hungarian economist and politician, member of the National Assembly (MP) from Politics Can Be Different (LMP) National List between 2010 and 2014.

He received his degrees in sociology, economics and social anthropology from Corvinus University and Central European University. He was a leading member of the Védegylet which nominated László Sólyom to the position President of Hungary in 2005. He is an organizer and instructor of the Ökofeszt since 2005. He was one of the founders of the LMP in Spring 2009. He is responsible for the party's economic policy. He was a candidate as MP for Pestszentlőrinc (Budapest Constituency XXVII) in the 2010 national election. He was elected to the National Assembly from the LMP's National List. He was a member of the Economic and Information Technology Committee since 14 May 2010.

In January 2013, the LMP's congress rejected electoral cooperation with other opposition forces, including Together 2014. As a result, members of LMP's “Dialogue for Hungary” platform, including Scheiring, announced their decision to leave the opposition party and form a new organization. Benedek Jávor said he eight MPs leaving LMP would keep their parliamentary mandates. The leaving MPs established Dialogue for Hungary as a full-fledged party.
