= Márta Demeter =

Hungarian politician

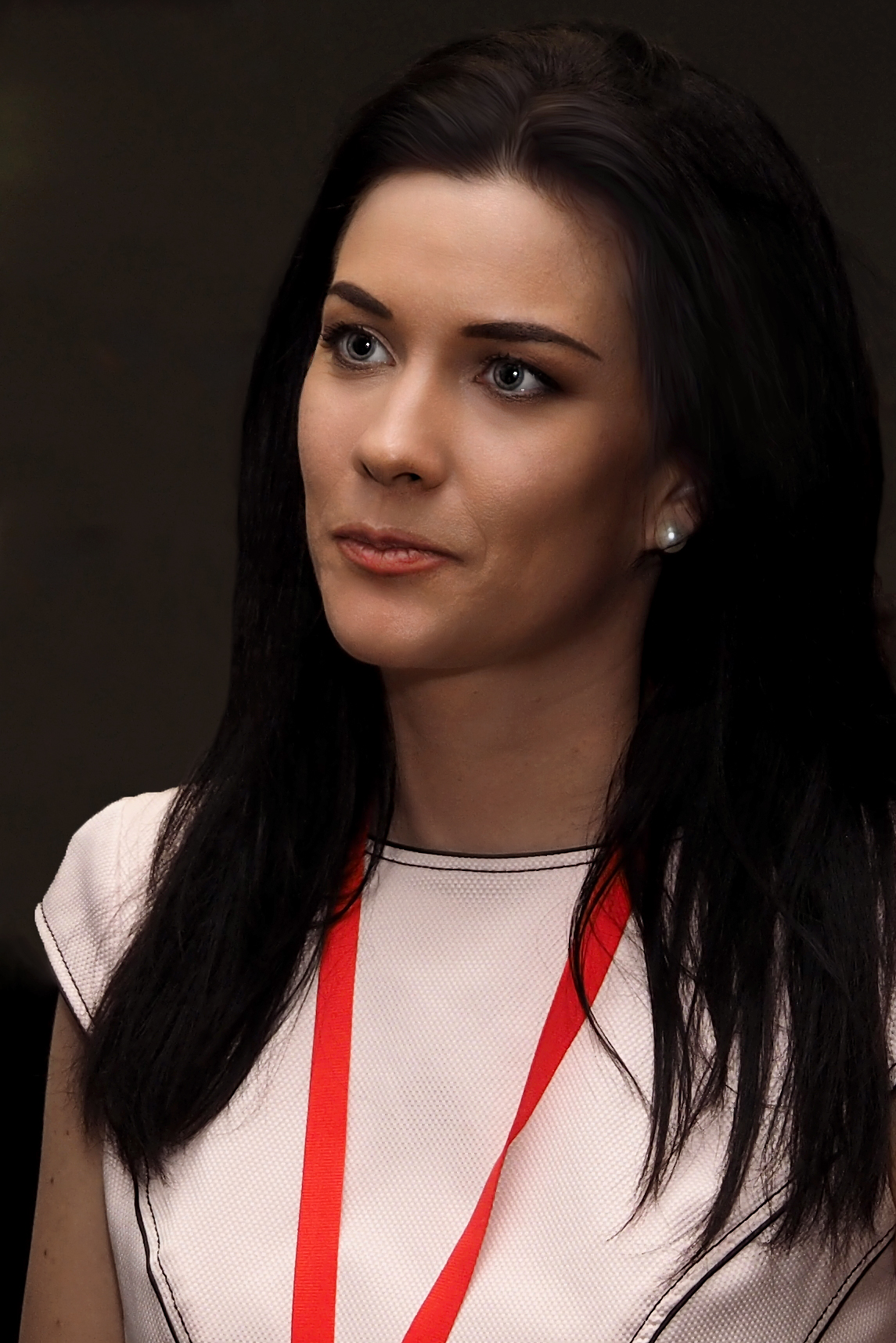

Co-President of LMP – Hungary's Green Party
- In office 21 August 2018 – 6 July 2019
- Preceded by: Bernadett Szél
- Succeeded by: Erzsébet Schmuck

Member of the National Assembly of Hungary
- Incumbent
- Assumed office 2018
- Parliamentary group: LMP – Hungary's Green Party

Member of the National Assembly of Hungary
- In office 2014–2018
- Parliamentary group: Hungarian Socialist Party (2014–2017); Independent (January – September 2017); LMP – Hungary's Green Party (September 2017 –2022)

Personal details
- Born: 6 March 1983 (age 43) Budapest
- Occupation: Politician; Political scientist

Márta Demeter (born 6 March 1983) is a Hungarian politician and political scientist. She was elected to the Hungarian National Assembly in 2014 and re-elected in 2018. In 2018 she was elected the co-chair of the Hungarian Green Party.

== Life and career ==
Demeter was born on 6 March 1983 in Budapest. She graduated from the Corvin Mátyás High School in Budapest, and then attended Gábor Dénes College for 3 years.

In December 2007, Demeter joined the Hungarian Socialist Party. In 2010 and 2011 she ran for municipal and interim offices in Zugló, becoming a member of the Finance Committee for Zugló Municipality. In 2012 she became a member of the National Board of the Hungarian Socialist Party.

In 2012 Demeter resumed her studies at The Milton Friedman University (hu), graduating in 2014 with a degree in political science. She then pursued a Masters Degree in Security and Defense Policy at the National University of Public Service.

In the 2014 Hungarian parliamentary election, Demeter ran for election to the National Assembly on the joint list that included the Hungarian Socialist Party, winning one of the lists's seats in parliament. In January 2017, she left Socialist Party, arguing that the Socialist Party was focused only on survival and was not electorally ambitious enough. She worked as an independent member of parliament unaffiliated with any party until September 2017, when she joined the parliamentary caucus of the Politics Can Be Different (LMP), officially joining the party itself in 2018.

In the 2018 Hungarian parliamentary election, Demeter was elected as a candidate to run on the LMP national list, and was re-elected to the parliament.

Demeter has served on a number of parliamentary committees including the Committee on Foreign Affairs, the Committee on Defense and Law Enforcement, and the Budget Committee. In 2018 she was elected co-chair of the Politics Can Be Different. Along with the entire presidium, Demeter resigned from her position after the 2019 European Parliament election, when the party failed to win any seats. She was succeeded as female co-chair by Erzsébet Schmuck in November 2019.

Party political offices
Preceded by Ákos Hadházy; Bernadett Szél	Co-President of the Politics Can Be Different alongside László Lóránt Keresztes; 2018–2019	Succeeded by János Kendernay; Erzsébet Schmuck
