= Virág Kaufer =

Hungarian politician

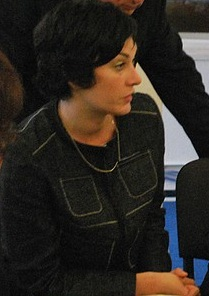

Member of the National Assembly
- In office 14 May 2010 – 1 February 2012

Personal details
- Born: 1975 (age 50–51) Budapest, Hungary
- Party: LMP
- Profession: politician

Virág Kaufer (born 1975) is a Hungarian politician, member of the National Assembly (MP) from Politics Can Be Different (LMP) National List between 2010 and 2012.

She was a member of the Committee on Employment and Labour from 14 May 2010 to 1 February 2012. She also served as Chairperson of the Subcommittee for Rehabilitation since 19 July 2010. Kaufer resigned from her parliamentary seat in January 2012. She told MTI she would return her parliamentary mandate to focus on organising other forms of “resistance” in civil communities against the "Orbán regime". She was replaced by Bernadett Szél on 13 February 2012.

In March 2021, 24.hu reported she and her partner Nóra plan to adopt a child, which is increasingly difficult in Hungary for same-sex couples.
