= Zoltán Illés =

Hungarian politician

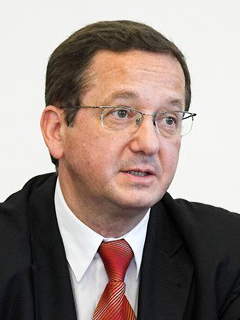

Member of the National Assembly
- In office 14 May 2010 – 5 May 2014
- In office 18 June 1998 – 15 May 2006

Personal details
- Born: 17 January 1961 (age 65) Subotica, PR Serbia, FPR Yugoslavia
- Party: Fidesz (since 1994)
- Spouse: Dr Adrienne Illésné Gerlényi
- Children: 1 son, Szabolcs
- Profession: Chemical engineer, politician

Dr. Zoltán Illés (born 17 January 1961) is a Hungarian chemical engineer and politician, member of the National Assembly of Hungary (MP) for Terézváros, 6th District of Budapest (Budapest Constituency VIII) from 2010 to 2014. He also represented Terézváros between 1998 and 2002. He secured a seat from Fidesz National List in the 2002 Hungarian parliamentary election.

He served as Chairman of the Committee on the Environment from 25 June 1998 to 14 May 2002. Illés was appointed Secretary of State for Environmental Protection and Water in the Ministry of Rural Development on 2 June 2010. He is also a meritorious student and received prestigious Fulbright - Humphrey Scholarship.

In September 2013, Illés responded to a formal question from Bernadett Szél (LMP) about the Roșia Montană Project in Romania, where amongst other things he said "just because you’re pretty doesn’t also mean you’re smart," and lectured her for daring to utter the Prime Minister Viktor Orbán's name. Later, Illés has apologized for these remarks. House Speaker László Kövér has defended Illés' controversial comments in parliament, referring to his fellow Fidesz politician’s words as "offensive, but not flagrantly offensive."

As environmentalist, he strongly criticized the planned upgrade of the Paks Nuclear Power Plant, signed between the Hungarian and Russian governments in January 2014. As a result, he was unable to run as parliamentary candidate for the 2014 parliamentary election. Since then, Illés accused Orbán's government in several cases with corruption and development of oligarchic system.

== Personal life ==
He is married. His wife is Dr Adrienne Illésné Gerlényi. They have a son, Szabolcs.
