= 2011 protests in Hungary =

2011 Hungarian protests
- Date: 17 March and 30 December 2010
- Location: Budapest
- Caused by: New Constitution of Hungary; Alleged authoritarian tendencies Increasingly clerical politics
- Goals: Maintain current Constitution; Protect democracy Maintain the freedom of religion Remove the flat tax
- Result: Ended; New Constitution passed

Parties
(Hungary) Hungarian opposition: Democratic Coalition; Hungarian Socialist Party; Politics Can Be Different	Government of Hungary; Fidesz

Lead figures
Ferenc Gyurcsány; Attila Mesterházy; Tímea Szabó	(Hungary) Viktor Orbán (Hungary) Pál Schmitt (Hungary) Tibor Navracsics; István Tarlós

The Hungarian protests of 2011 were popular protests against the new constitution proposed by the parliamentary majority following the 2010 Hungarian parliamentary election, which came into force on 1 January 2012.

The new constitution met some resistance not only from the oppositional parties but also from the public. According to the critics it served to strengthen the power of the ruling party.

There were two large protests in Budapest, one on 17 March and another on 30 December. At these occasions protesters chanted slogans denouncing the prime minister and his "dictatorship". The protests also appealed to maintain the freedom of religion and against the flat 16% income tax.

== See also ==
- Taxation in Hungary
- Hungarian Constitution
