= Bernadett Szél =

Hungarian economist and politician

Bernadett Szél MP
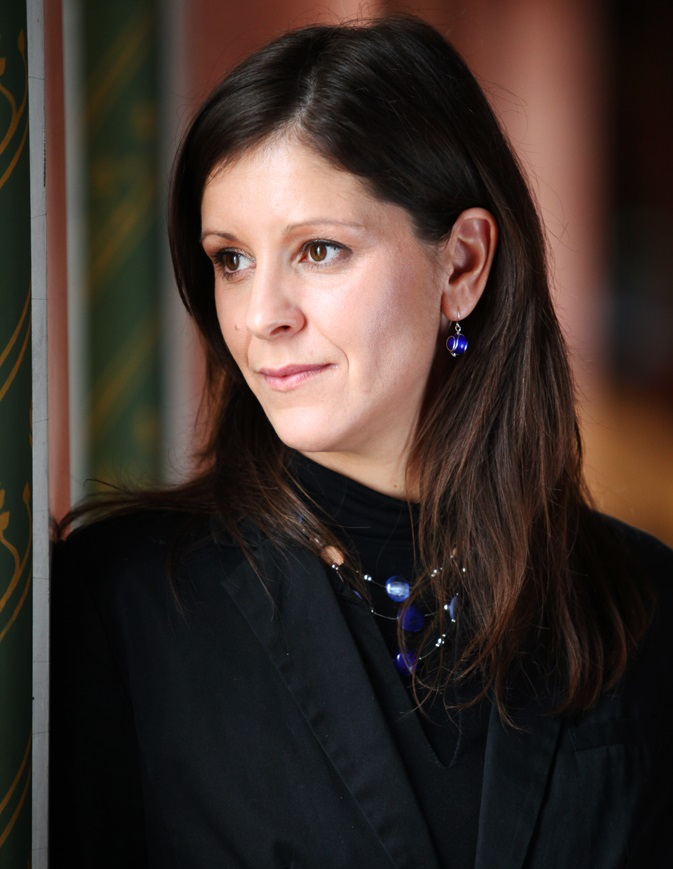

Co-President of the Politics Can Be Different
- In office 24 March 2013 – 21 August 2018
- Preceded by: New office
- Succeeded by: László Lóránt Keresztes & Márta Demeter

Member of the National Assembly
- In office 13 February 2012 – 1 May 2022

Personal details
- Born: 9 March 1977 (age 49) Pécs, Hungary
- Party: LMP (2010–18)
- Other political affiliations: HP
- Children: 2
- Profession: economist

Dr. Bernadett Szél (born 9 March 1977) is a Hungarian economist and politician, and was a member of the National Assembly (MP) between 2012 and 2022. She was co-President of the Politics Can Be Different (Lehet Más a Politika; LMP) party from 2013 to 2018, and its candidate for the position of Prime Minister during the 2018 parliamentary election. Between 2018 and 2022 she became an independent parliamentarian. As of 2022 she works as researcher and consultant. She is married and lives in Budakeszi with her husband and three children. Global climate protection and dedication to the green agenda, commitment to democracy and democratic Hungary, and equality of rights are consistently the main driving forces throughout her professional life.

== Works ==
Szél was born in Pécs on 9 March 1977. She finished her secondary studies at the Zrínyi Miklós Secondary Grammar School in Zalaegerszeg. In 2000 she graduated from Corvinus University of Budapest (International Relations), where she received her Ph.D. in 2011.

Between 2000 and 2002, she worked for the Department of Corporate Affairs of Philip Morris International. After that she became program manager at the Menedék – Migránsokat Segítő Egyesület human rights organization from March to July 2002. From September 2002, she was a researcher at the Office of Supported Research Institutions of the Hungarian Academy of Sciences (MTA) for three years. She worked for the Hungarian Central Statistical Office (KSH) and also functioned as EU rapporteur since 2006.

Her research interests were family sociology, family policies and state capacity, her current research areas are democracy, equality of rights and climate protection. She is a member of several research teams, and participated in domestic and international projects. She has advanced skills in English and German languages, and currently learns Mandarin. Currently she lives in Budakeszi with her husband and three children.

== Political career ==
Szél began her political career in the Humanist Party (HP); she later joined Politics Can Be Different in 2010. She was a candidate in the 2010 Hungarian parliamentary election. She ran for the mayoral seat of Budakeszi in the 2010 local election, and received 10.89% of the vote.

Szél became a Member of Parliament on 13 February 2012, replacing Virág Kaufer, who resigned on 1 February. She was elected to the Committee on Employment and Labour on 20 February. She became a member of the Committee on Youth, Social, Family, and Housing Affairs and Vice Chairperson of the Committee on Sustainable Development on 23 September 2013.

She functioned as an independent MP between February and September 2013, when the LMP parliamentary group disbanded according to the house rules, after eight members left the caucus to establish the Dialogue for Hungary (PM). Szél and András Schiffer were elected co-presidents of the LMP during the party's congress on 24 March 2013.

In September 2013, during a parliamentary debate Szél asked Zoltán Illés, the State Secretary for Environmental Affairs about the Roșia Montană Project in Romania, where, inter alia, he replied "just because you're pretty doesn't also mean you're smart," and heavily defended Prime Minister Viktor Orbán's politics from Szél's criticism. Later, Illés apologized for these remarks. House Speaker László Kövér has defended Illés' controversial comments, referring to his fellow Fidesz politician's words as "offensive, but not flagrantly offensive."

She was elected Member of Parliament from the party's national list in the 2014 parliamentary election. She became a member of the Committee on National Security 6 May 2014. After the resignation of Erzsébet Schmuck, Szél was elected leader of the LMP parliamentary group on 16 February 2017. In September 2017, Bernadett Szél was nominated the party's candidate to the position of prime minister for the upcoming parliamentary election. Viktor Orbán's Fidesz won two-thirds majority in the national election again, while LMP received 7 percent of the vote. Szél was re-elected MP via the party's national list, as she was narrowly defeated by Zsolt Csenger-Zalán in Budakeszi constituency.

She held several parliamentary and party leadership positions, and was a member of numerous parliamentary committees, such as the National Security Committee of the Hungarian Parliament. Between 2018 and 2022 she became an independent parliamentarian. As of 2022 she works as researcher and consultant.

Party political offices
Preceded by New office	Co-President of the Politics Can Be Different alongside András Schiffer (2013–2016), Ákos Hadházy (2016–2018), and László Lóránt Keresztes (2018); 2013–2018	Succeeded by László Lóránt Keresztes; Márta Demeter
National Assembly of Hungary
Preceded by Erzsébet Schmuck	Leader of the LMP parliamentary group 2017–2018	Succeeded by László Lóránt Keresztes
