= Ökofeszt =

The Ökofeszt or Ecofest was festival which was held to celebrate eco friendly ideas in Hungary. The first Ökofeszt was organized by Védegylet and Zöld Fiatalok and held on 15 and 16 April 2005 in Budapest.

The slogan of the festival was Politics Can Be Different which led to the formation of an eponymous political party in 2009. Politics Can Be Different won seats in the National Assembly in the 2010 parliamentary election. The key issues of the festival were environmental protection, sustainable development and the fight against corruption in the current Hungarian political elite. The public face of the party is András Schiffer, who presented a talk at the first Ökofeszt in 2005 and is a former member of the Hungarian Civil Liberties Union.

== Talks ==
Year	City	Performer
2005	Budapest	András Schiffer (ex-MP of Politics Can Be Different); László Majtényi (lawyer); István Elek (writer); Péter Rauschenberger (philosopher); András Lányi (writer)

== Concerts ==
Year	City	Performer
2005	Budapest	Kaukázus; Besh o drom; Fakutya táncház; Dawnstar; Tanu Tuva; Egy Kis Erzsi Zene
