= Humanist Party (Hungary) =

Humanist Party Humanista Párt
- Last leader: Tibor Várady
- Founded: 1993; 14 January 2003 (2nd)
- Dissolved: November 2012
- Ideology: Neohumanism
- Political position: Centre-left
- International affiliation: Humanist International
- Colours: Orange
- National Assembly: 0 / 199
- European Parliament: 0 / 21
- County Assemblies: 0 / 419

Website
- www.humanista.hu/hp

The Humanist Party (Hungarian: Humanista Párt, pronounced [ˈhumɒniʃtɒ ˈpaːrt]) was a political party in Hungary, and it was a member of the Humanist International.

== History ==
The Humanist Party (HP) was founded in 1993 and became a member of the Humanist International. As the party did not run in two consecutive elections (1994 and 1998), the Court of Budapest ceased its operations according to the existing legislation. The party re-established in January 2003.

At the legislative election, on 7 April and 21 April 2002, the party won no seats. At the local election in 2002 the party in Budapest won 0.36% of the popular vote and no seats.

The Humanist Party made an electoral alliance with Politics Can Be Different (LMP) at the 2009 European Parliament elections. The coalition garnered 75,522 votes, (or 2.61% of the total votes), which was less than the 5% needed to gain a seat for the 2009–2014 cycle. In March 2010 the Humanist Party broke the agreement and decided no to run at 2010 Hungarian parliamentary election. The Humanist Party dissolved in November 2012 and transformed itself to a civil organization.

== Election results ==
For the European Parliament:

Election year	# of overall votes	% of overall vote	# of overall seats won	+/-	Notes
2009^{1}	75,522	2.61 (#5)	0 / 22	0	

^{1} In an electoral alliance with the Politics Can Be Different (LMP)
