= András Schiffer =

Hungarian former politician

András Schiffer MP
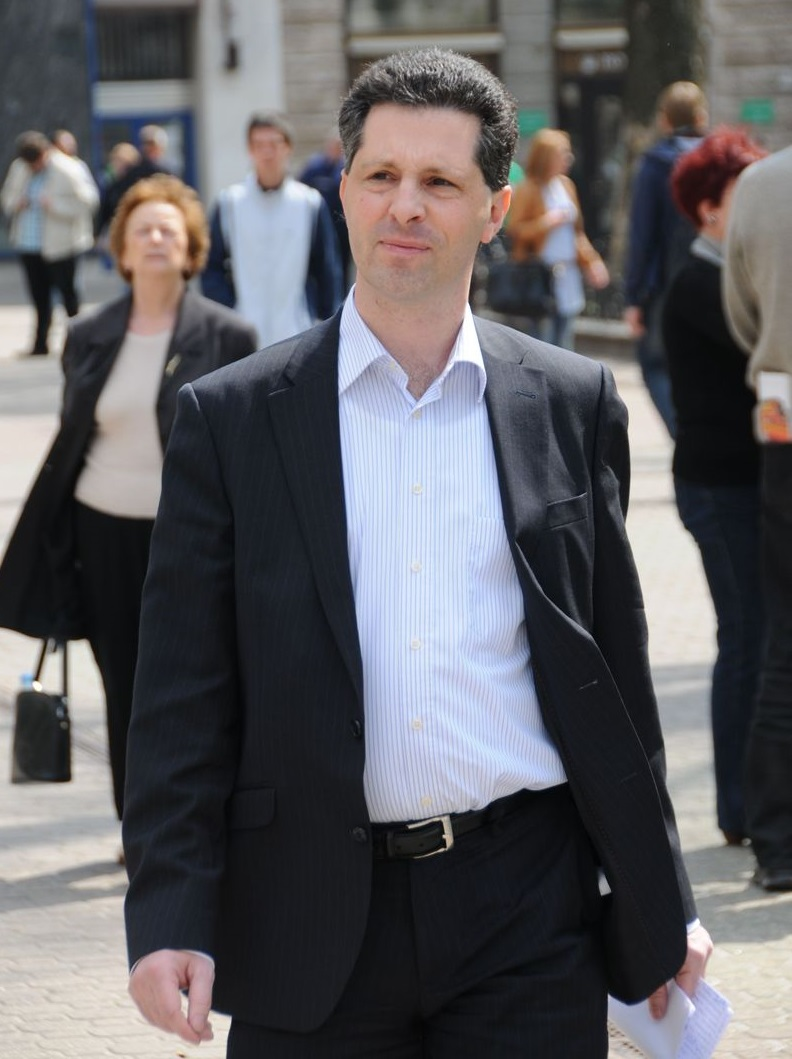

Co-President of the Politics Can Be Different
- In office 24 March 2013 – 1 June 2016
- Preceded by: New office
- Succeeded by: Ákos Hadházy; Bernadett Szél

Member of the National Assembly
- In office 14 May 2010 – 5 September 2016

Personal details
- Born: 19 June 1971 (age 55) Budapest, Hungary
- Party: LMP (2009–18)
- Profession: jurist, politician

András Schiffer (born 19 June 1971 in Budapest) is a Hungarian lawyer and former politician, who served as co-president of the Politics Can Be Different and leader of its parliamentary group. Schiffer announced his retirement from politics on 31 May 2016.

== Early life ==
András Schiffer was born in Budapest on 19 June 1971 to journalist Péter Schiffer (born 1943), a former deputy director of the Hungarian Financial Supervisory Authority (PSZÁF) and jurist Anna Hajnal. Among his uncles are director Pál Schiffer and Socialist politician János Schiffer, who served as Deputy Mayor of Budapest between 1994 and 2006. His grandfather was Pál Schiffer Sr., a Member of Parliament and Hungarian Ambassador to Norway. His great-grandfather was Árpád Szakasits, a leading Social Democrat, then Communist political figure also president of Hungary in (1948–1949) and Chairman of the Presidential Council of the Hungarian People's Republic (1949–1950) during Communist rule. Schiffer received his Juris Doctor degree at the Faculty of Law of the Eötvös Loránd University in 1995.

In 1989 he was a member of the short-lived "New Generation Movement" led by Ferenc Gyurcsány. In 1990 he was a founding member of the Young Socialists political movement. He was a leader there until 1992 when he quit that organization. He then worked in the private sector and return to public affairs via the green movement. He became part of the leadership of Védegylet. Védegylet was instrumental in electing László Sólyom for President of Hungary, against the Socialist Speaker of the House, Katalin Szili, Schiffer took a leading role in that campaign personally as well.

Schiffer served as Charge d'Affaires of the Hungarian Civil Liberties Union (HCLU) from 2004 to 2008. He left the legal aid organization in the Summer of 2008.

== Political career ==
In 2008 Schiffer founded the Politics Can Be Different movement, which formally organized as the LMP party in 2009. In the 2010 national elections in Hungary he was the leader of the LMP party list and was elected as a member of the Hungarian Parliament. He resigned as LMP parliamentary group leader in January 2012. He was succeeded by Benedek Jávor.

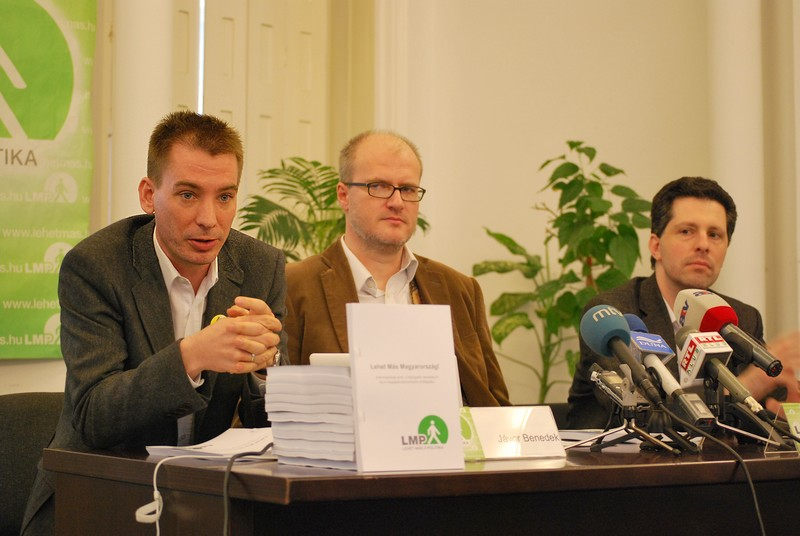
Schiffer (right) presents the LMP's program prior to the 2010 elections.

During the Politics Can Be Different party's congress in November 2012, the party decided not to join Together 2014, the electoral alliance of opposition parties and movements led by Gordon Bajnai. As a result, Benedek Jávor, a follower of the agreement, resigned from his position of parliamentary group leader. Unlike Jávor, Schiffer did not support cooperation with Bajnai and the Hungarian Socialist Party (MSZP). According to the press, Schiffer's group won within the party and eclipsed the other group, led by Benedek Jávor and Gergely Karácsony. In the first round, the parliamentary caucus failed to elect its new leader. Schiffer was nominated but rejected by an 8-to-7 vote. The platform 'Dialogue for Hungary' was formed within the party on 26 November 2012, with Jávor as one of its founders. The platform gathers those who would back the Together 2014 electoral movement with the aim of "changing the Orbán regime." Later that day Schiffer was elected leader of the LMP parliamentary group for a second time.

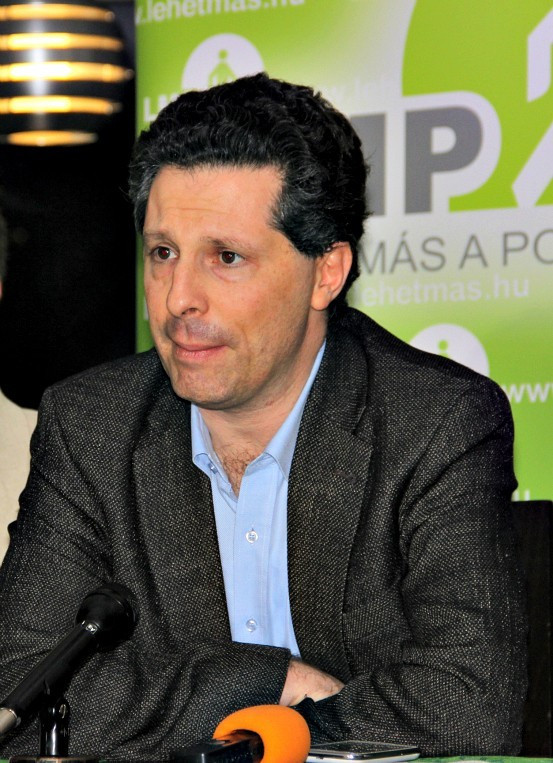
MP András Schiffer in 2014

In January 2013, the LMP's congress rejected electoral cooperation with other opposition forces, including Together 2014. As a result, members of LMP's "Dialogue for Hungary" platform announced their decision to leave the opposition party and form a new organization. Benedek Jávor said the eight MPs leaving LMP would keep their parliamentary mandates and would coordinate with the remaining seven LMP lawmakers in order to keep the parliamentary group operational on some level. Schiffer said the move would not lead to a party split. Less than 10 percent of the party's membership had indicated a desire to leave the party, he said. The leaving MPs established Dialogue for Hungary as a full-fledged party. The eight MPs also left the parliamentary group which then broke up, according to the rules of the National Assembly.

Schiffer and Bernadett Szél were elected co-presidents of the LMP during the party's congress on 24 March 2013. The seven party MPs were able to re-establish the LMP's caucus on 1 September 2013, after the decision of the Committee on Immunity, Incompatibility and Mandate. Schiffer said the newly former LMP parliamentary group became the first group in Hungarian history with a female majority. On 18 July 2015, Schiffer and Szél were re-elected co-presidents of the party.

On 31 May 2016, Schiffer announced his retirement from politics in an interview in Index.hu. He resigned as co-president of the LMP and leader of its parliamentary group on 1 June, and also added he would give up his parliamentary seat on 31 August. Schiffer, referring to the new housing rules unilaterally adopted by ruling party Fidesz, said "the current parliamentary term has clearly demonstrated that we do not have the intellectual atmosphere for politics critical of the system". Schiffer declared that he would not participate in the next parliamentary election and would return to his previous profession as a lawyer. Disagreeing with the party's "new direction", Schiffer quit the LMP on 7 May 2018.

== Political commentator and far-right connections ==
Since 2016 he has been a prominent political commentator. Recently, he has promoted both the far-right Our Homeland Movement and the far-left Hungarian Workers' Party as it was also noted by political commentator Róbert Puzsér. In July 2026, Our Homeland Movement nominated Schiffer for a seat on the Constitutional Court.

His viewpoints on Israel, international politics, globalization, the workers' movement, and on many other topics (but not on some cultural issues) are also similar to those of Sahra Wagenknecht and other conservative far-left parties like Stacilo including elements of far-right talking points especially when it comes to national sovereignty and international capitalism.

National Assembly of Hungary
Preceded by First	Leader of the LMP parliamentary group 2010–2012	Succeeded by Benedek Jávor
Preceded by Benedek Jávor	Leader of the LMP parliamentary group 2012–2013; 2013–2016	Succeeded by Erzsébet Schmuck
Party political offices
Preceded by New office	Co-President of the Politics Can Be Different alongside Bernadett Szél; 2013–2016	Succeeded by Ákos Hadházy; Bernadett Szél
