= Erzsébet Schmuck =

Hungarian economist and politician

Erzsébet Schmuck MP
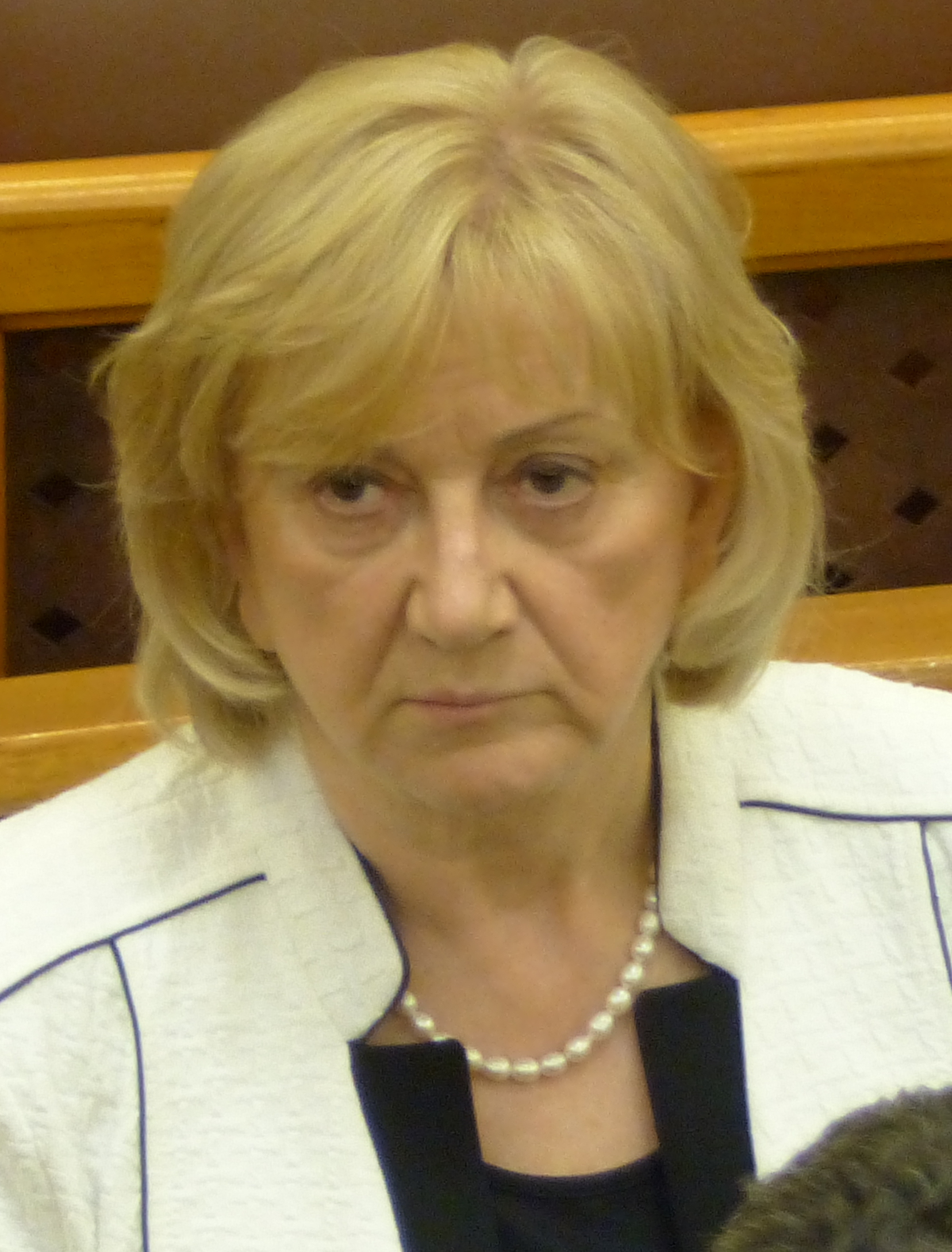
- Schmuck in 2016

Member of the National Assembly
- In office 6 May 2014 – 1 May 2022

Personal details
- Born: 19 February 1954 (age 72) Nagykáta, Hungary
- Party: MZP (1989–1993); ZA (1993–1998); LMP (2009–2024)
- Profession: Environmentalist, ecologist

Erzsébet Schmuck (born 19 February 1954) is a Hungarian environmentalist, economist and politician. She was a member of the National Assembly (MP) from the LMP – Hungary's Green Party (Greens) National List from 2014 to 2022. She was elected leader of the party's parliamentary group in September 2016, serving in this capacity until February 2017. She served as co-chairperson of LMP from November 2019 to August 2024, when she left the party.

== Professional career ==
After finishing secondary studies in Szerb Antal Secondary Grammar School in 1972, she graduated as an economist from the Karl Marx University of Economic Sciences (today Corvinus University of Budapest) in 1977. She began to work as a payroll manager at the Budapest Directorate of the Hungarian State Railways (MÁV). In 1979 she joined the Hungarian Young Communist League (KISZ) staff, where she served as Secretary of the Youth Environmental Council between 1984 and 1989. She earned a doctorate in 1984.

In 1989, she was one of the founders of the Society of Hungarian Conservationists (MTVSZ), where she functioned as Chairperson until 2002 and from 2004 to 2008. Beside that she was also Secretary of the Central and Eastern European Network of NGOs For the Enhancement of Biodiversity between 1994 and 1996. She was elected to the leadership of the European Environmental Bureau (EBU) in 1996, where she served as a vice-president between 2000 and 2006. She was also Deputy Chairperson of the National Environmental Council three times (1997–1998, 1999–2000, 2006–2007).

== Political career ==
Schmuck was a founding member of several green political initiatives in the 1990s. From 1989 to 1993, she was a member of the Green Party of Hungary (MZP), where she was delegated to the 7-member presidency. Following the radical right-wing ideological turnout within the party, a number of environmentalist members, including Schmuck, decided to left the party and establish the Green Alternative (ZA) in June 1993. György Droppa and Schmuck were elected co-leaders of the party during its inaugural congress. During the 1994 parliamentary election, she was an MP candidate of the Agrarian Alliance (ASZ), in accordance with the two parties' agreement. Following the failure 1998 parliamentary election, Schmuck resigned from her position and quit the party on 21 June 1998.

After the 2002 parliamentary election, she was appointed Deputy Secretary of State for EU Integration and International Relations in the Ministry of Environment and Water. She held that office until 2003. She became Secretary of the National Council for Sustainable Development within the National Assembly in 2008. Two years later she returned to MTVSZ.

She participated in the foundation of the Politics Can Be Different (LMP). She served as secretary of the party's national board for a short time in 2012. She functioned as co-President of the party's Ökopolisz Foundation from 2012 to 2015, alongside economist Péter Róna. In the 2014 parliamentary election, she was elected Member of Parliament. She served as one of the recorders of the National Assembly between 6 May 2014 and 19 October 2015. After that she became deputy leader of her party's parliamentary group. She was appointed Vice-Chairperson of the Committee on Budgets on 6 May 2014, holding the position until 2 October 2017. Thereafter, she was a member of the Economic Committee until May 2018.

Schmuck was elected leader of the Politics Can Be Different's parliamentary group on 6 September 2016, replacing András Schiffer, who retired from politics earlier. Before that, co-president Bernadett Szél was considered the biggest favorite for the position, however the party board entrusted her with the establishment of branches in countryside. Schmuck's position of group leader was confirmed by the caucus on 13 September. In a few months, Schmuck resigned from her position, giving reason that she intend to concentrate on organizational work within the party. Schmuck became MP via her party's national list in the 2018 Hungarian parliamentary election, after she unsuccessfully ran in Budapest 14th constituency. She served as chairperson of the Committee on Sustainable Development between 8 May 2018 and 1 May 2022.

She was elected female co-chair of the Politics Can Be Different on 23 November 2019, following the party's catastrophic defeat in the 2019 European Parliament election. Under her leadership, the party changed its name to the LMP – Hungary's Green Party in February 2020, and the party joined the electoral alliance United for Hungary, as its least prominent member among the six opposition parties. During the 2021 Hungarian opposition primary, she was the sole candidate of the electoral alliance in Pest County 9th constituency (Nagykáta). During the 2022 parliamentary election, she, acquiring only 28.65 percent, was heavily defeated by the ruling party Fidesz–KDNP candidate György Czerván in Nagykáta constituency, thus Schmuck lost her parliamentary seat after eight years. She was re-elected female co-chair in August 2022.

Schmuck did not run for party leadership during the party's 2024 congress. On 24 August 2024, she announced her quit from LMP citing that the party "lost its opposition and green political image" under the dominance of Péter Ungár.

== Sources ==
- Vida, István (2011). Magyarországi politikai pártok lexikona (1846–2010) [Encyclopedia of the Political Parties in Hungary (1846–2010)] (in Hungarian). Gondolat Kiadó. ISBN 978-963-693-276-3.

Party political offices
Preceded by New party	Co-President of the Green Alternative alongside György Droppa; 1993–1998	Succeeded by György Droppa; Márta Márczis
Preceded by László Lóránt Keresztes; Márta Demeter	Co-President of the Politics Can Be Different alongside János Kendernay (2019–2020), Máté Kanász-Nagy (2020–2022) and Péter Ungár (2022–2024); 2019–2024	Succeeded by Péter Ungár; Katalin Szabó-Kellner
National Assembly of Hungary
Preceded by András Schiffer	Leader of the LMP parliamentary group 2016–2017	Succeeded by Bernadett Szél
