= 2014 Hungarian Internet tax protests =

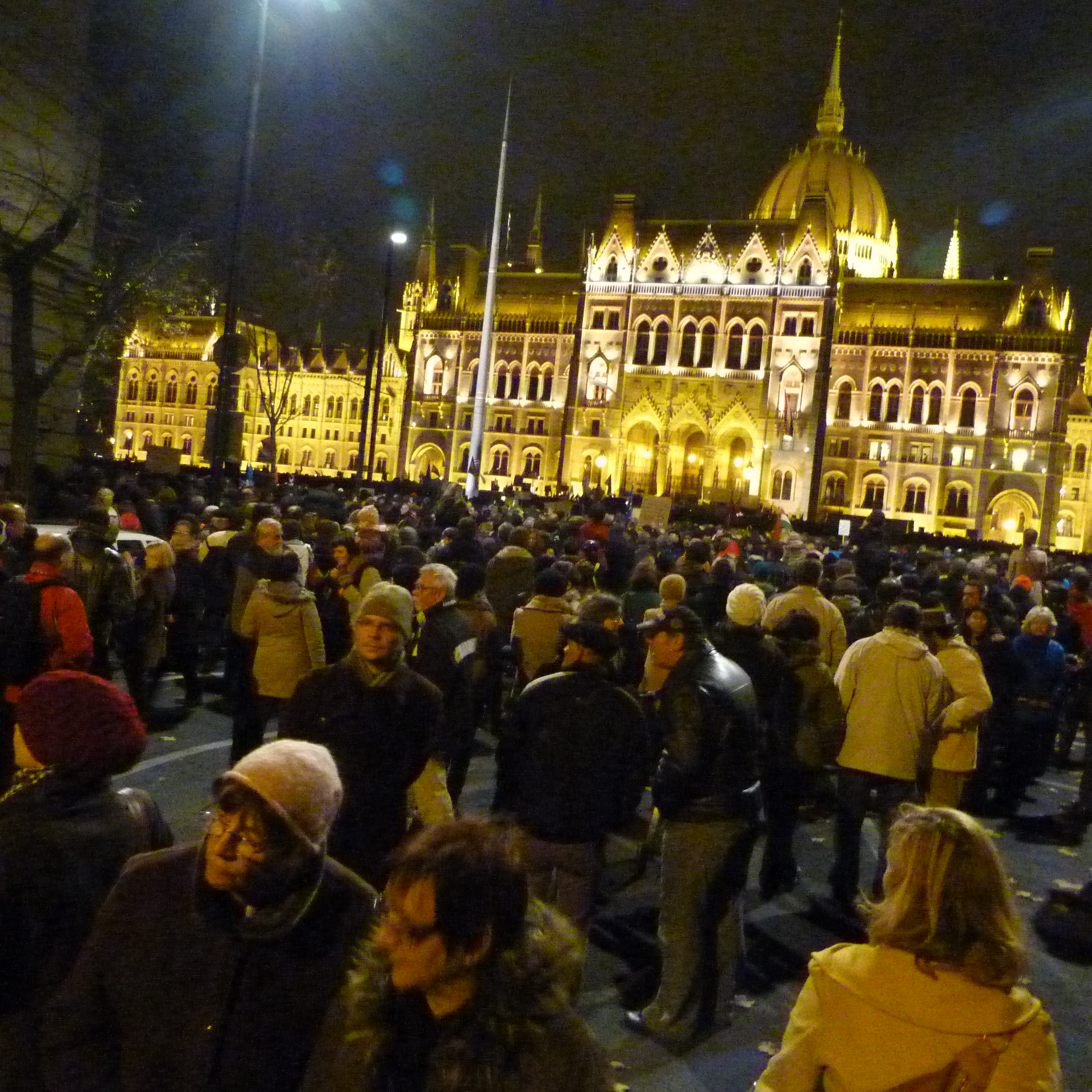
- Demonstration in Kossuth Square, Budapest, 17 November 2014
- Date: 26 October – 17 November 2014
- Location: Mainly Budapest
- Caused by: Planned Internet tax; PM's Russian affinities; Corruption allegations; Centralization allegations; Claims of violating democratic norms
- Goals: Wider democratic freedoms; Resignation of PM Viktor Orbán
- Result: Internet tax proposal cancelled; Following civil demonstrations in other subjects

Parties
Non-partisan protest groups	Government of Hungary

Lead figures
Balázs Gulyás; Zoltán Vajda; Emília Nagy; Tamás Lattmann	Viktor Orbán; Mihály Varga; Antal Rogán; Tamás Deutsch

Number
100,000 on 28 October	

Casualties
- Arrested: 6

In late October 2014, anti-government demonstrations were held in Hungary, which were triggered by the government's announcement of a proposal to include the taxation of Internet usage in the Taxation Law, to be in effect from 2015. The ruling right-wing coalition's larger party, Fidesz made their proposal public on October 21, which is meant to extend the existing telecommunications tax to Internet usage. The proposal designated a 150 HUF/GB tax rate (with 150 Ft being around $0.62, £0.38, or €0.49) paid by the internet service providers. Later, a cap was proposed: HUF 700 per month (individuals) or HUF 5,000 (companies).

This idea, possibly coupled with other issues surfacing around the government prompted multiple, generally peaceful demonstrations in Budapest and in other cities in and outside Hungary. The amendment to the law is universally referred to as the "internet tax" (Hungarian: internetadó) by Hungarian and global media outlets and critics, although Fidesz was not using the term in their proposal.

Following mass protests and international critics, the Hungarian government officially cancelled the proposed tax on internet data traffic on 31 October 2014.

== Tax reform ==
As part of its economical reforms, Fidesz started to draft the new version of the Tax Law for 2015. Minister of National Economy Mihály Varga announced the proposal on October 21. According to the draft, Internet traffic would be taxed with a 150 Ft/GB rate irrespective of the type of data transmitted.

== Reactions ==
=== Online ===
A Facebook page named Százezren az internetadó ellen ("Hundred Thousand Against the Internet Tax") was created on October 21, the same day the proposal was made public, by Balázs Gulyás, a 27-year-old political blogger, who is also the son of Socialist politician Zita Gurmai. A week later, on the 28th, the page had more than 225,000 "likes".

On Twitter, multiple hashtags became associated with the tax and the demonstrations, the most widely used is #internetado ("internet tax"). Others include #netado ("net tax") and #internettax.

The tax and the demonstrations sparked the creation of memetic images, mocking Fidesz and its chairman, prime minister Viktor Orbán, but some also mocking the demonstrators.

=== Demonstrations ===
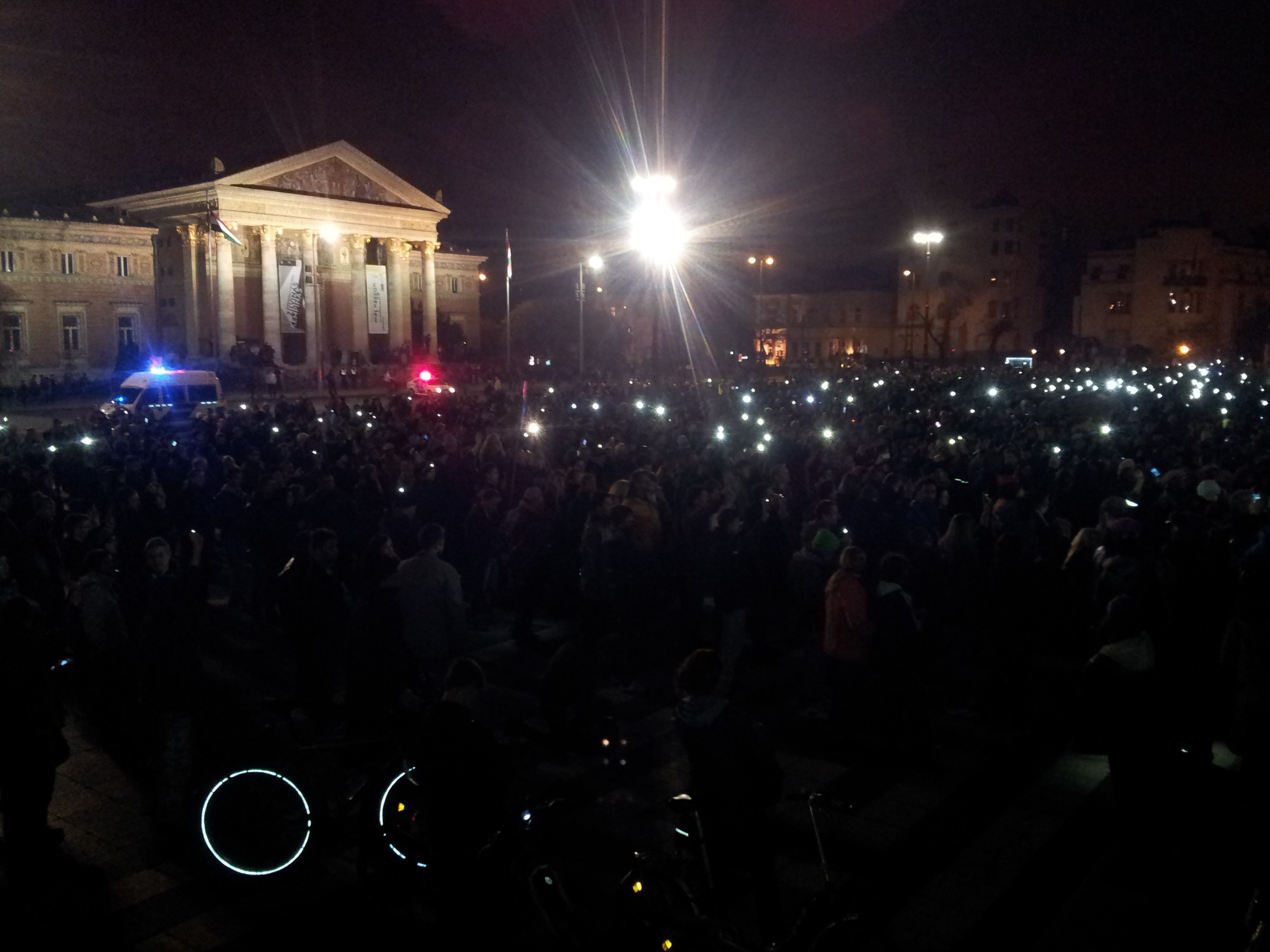
A "candlelight vigil" with thousands of protesters holding up their phones

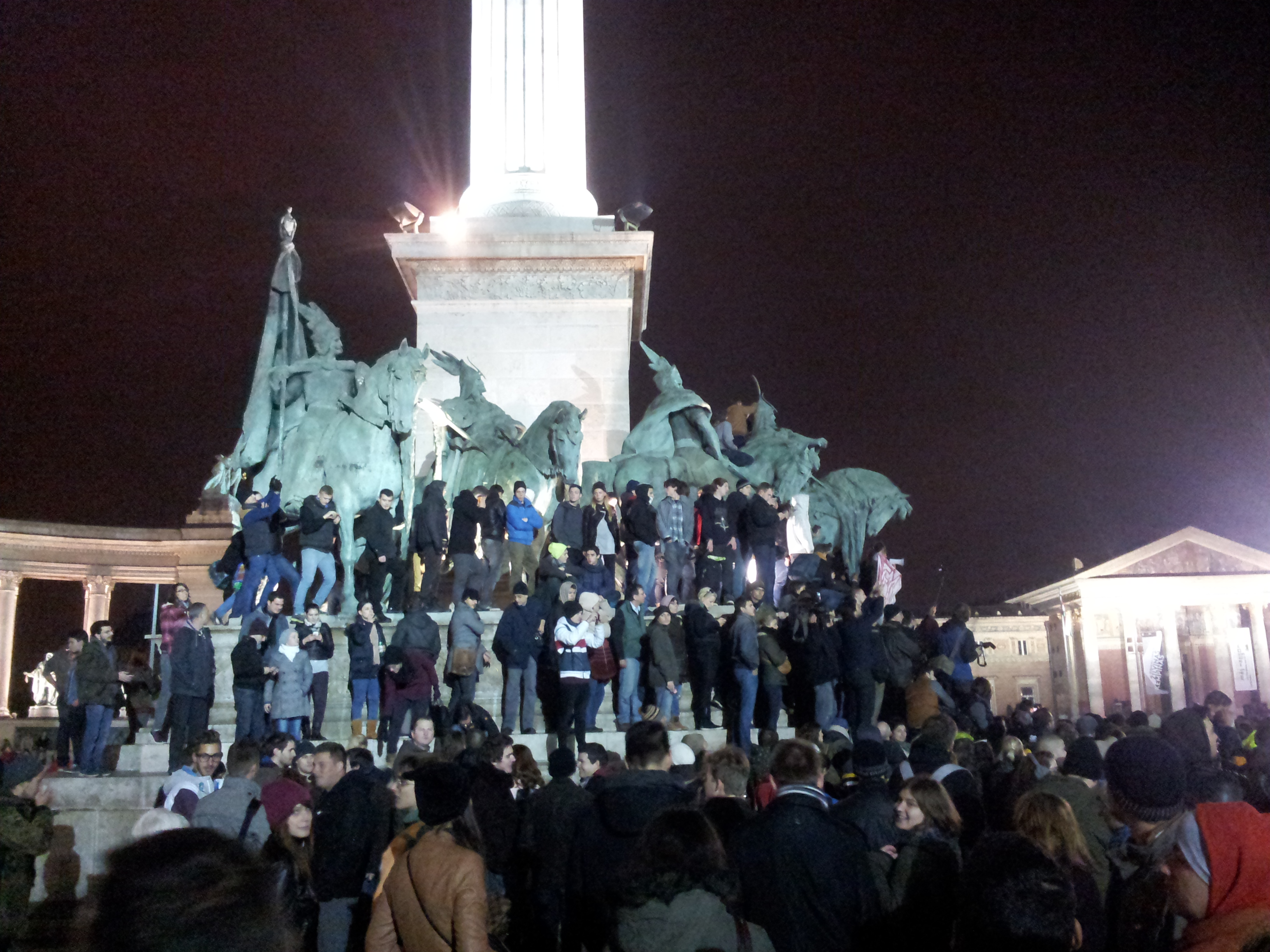
Demonstrators at Heroes' Square in Budapest

Gulyás acted as the main organizer of the two main demonstrations at Budapest, also making speeches to the crowd present. The first event was on the 26th in the early evening hours, and instantly got international media coverage. Tens of thousands of people gathered, and while the demonstration's intention was peaceful, hundreds of people attacked the Fidesz party headquarters after the event finished. The building's fence was toppled and its windows were broken in, many people hurled broken computer equipment at the building, including CRT monitors. The day ended with no riot police intervention, though they were assigned to the scene after some time to guard the building. Six people were arrested, including a well-known LGBT activist Milán Rózsa.

Despite the demand of the demonstrators, Fidesz made it clear they will introduce the tax next year, but they proposed an amendment to cap the tax at 700 Ft/month/subscriber for home users and 5000 Ft/month/subscriber for business users, while stating they intend the tax to be paid by the ISPs rather than the end users. The demonstrators, not finding this satisfactory, gave an "ultimatum" to the government to abandon their plan in the next 48 hours or they would face another demonstration. Since Fidesz did not retract their idea, another demonstration was held on the 28th in the early evening hours. Simultaneously, similar events took place in multiple cities in Hungary, and also in Warsaw, Poland. All these later events ended without any vandalism, although riot police was guarding the parliament building. Reuters estimated the number of people approximately 100,000 at the second Budapest demonstration, which was concluded with Gulyás saying that "this is only the beginning", and projected another gathering for November 17, the day the parliament will vote on the modified Tax Law.

=== International ===
European Commissioner for Digital Agenda Neelie Kroes called the tax proposal as a "terrible idea". Her spokesperson said "it's not a question whether the tax is legal or not. First, if you take it in the domestic Hungary context, it's the latest of what a lot of people would see as troubling actions. It's part of a pattern and has to be seen as part of that pattern of actions which have limited freedom or sought to take rents without achieving a wider economic or social interest". On 22 October 2014 Kroes added, through her Twitter account, the proposal "is a shame: a shame for users and a shame on the Hungarian government".

Last Week's John Oliver satirized the Internet tax proposal and other steps of the Orbán cabinet in his late-night talk television program.

== Withdrawal of the proposal ==
Following mass protests, the Hungarian government decided to drop the idea of proposed Internet tax on 31 October 2014. Prime Minister Viktor Orbán said "this tax in its current form cannot be introduced" and added the protesters misunderstood the government's intention. Orbán also commissioned MEP and fellow Fidesz member Tamás Deutsch to organize the conditions for so-called "national consultation" and compile its questions.

On 17 November 2014 at "Public Outrage Day" protest, while celebrating the abolition of Internet tax proposal, tens of thousands protested against government corruption by chanting slogans including "Orbán out!", "Europe", "Democracy" and "Regime change". This event marked the end of demonstrations against the proposed Internet tax, however protests have continued in other subjects (against corruption, reorganization of road taxes, luxury lifestyle of some leading Fidesz politicians etc.)

== Background and analysis ==
Some media outlets speculated about the possible reasons behind the fact that the demonstrations are the largest anti-government events since the protests in 2006 against then-ruling socialist party MSZP. Fidesz won the elections in 2010, gaining supermajority in the parliament, making them being able to pass or change legislation without hindrance from opposing political forces. They also won again in the 2014 election. Party chairman and prime minister Viktor Orbán used this political power to introduce several changes according to his political visions, like economic opening towards nations Eastward outside the European Union, notably Russia. Fidesz also crafted the new constitution of Hungary (now referred to as the "Fundamental Law of Hungary") on the basis that the existing one was a legacy after the fall of communism in 1989, being a heavily modified version of the communist-era constitution adopted to a democratic, capitalist state.

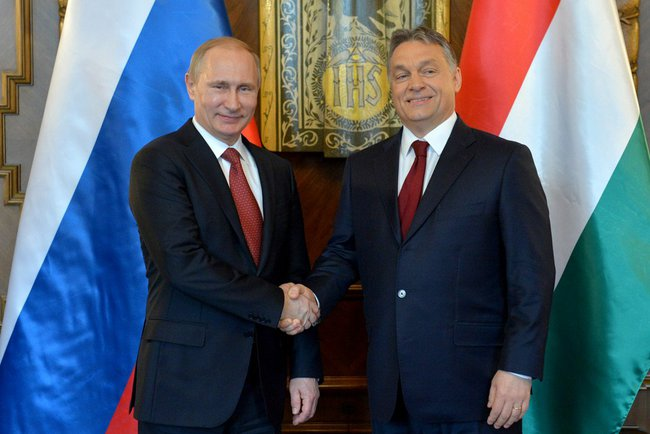
Orbán's Russian affinities is subject of domestic and international critics.

Possible reasons for the demonstrations' popularity include Fidesz's austerity measures and new taxes affecting the telecommunications, energy, and banking sectors, the dissolution of the private pension system, the adoption of a new constitution crafted solely by Fidesz, the approval of the new "Media Law", the decision to agree with Russia about a loan to support the two-reactor expansion of the Paks Nuclear Power Plant, and the allegedly corrupt nationalization of tobacco shops. Two focal issues which demonstrators are well aware of are the corruption accusations of government-related officials by the United States government, and the fact that Fidesz itself opposed and criticized a similar internet tax when rival MSZP considered it in 2008.

According to the Medián's public opinion poll published on 10 December 2014 support for Fidesz–KDNP government coalition dropped by 12 percentage points (from 38 to 26%) among all voters, following mass demonstrations against the Internet tax proposal and US-introduced entry ban on six Hungarian officials. Fidesz lost more than 900,000 potential voters and this was the largest monthly decrease since the Őszöd speech when MSZP suffered serious loss of support. In the following months, Fidesz also lost its two-thirds majority when Veszprém individual seat was taken by Zoltán Kész, an independent candidate in a by-election. Another by-election on 12 April 2015 saw the supermajority lose a second seat, also in Veszprém, to a Jobbik candidate. Only the far-right Jobbik was able to take advantage of the decline of support for the Fidesz.

Protests were organized by non-governmental organizations (NGO) and private individuals excluding the opposition parties who only responded to the events. Demonstration organizers also emphasized party logos, banners, slogans not to present at the events. As a result, former Prime Minister Ferenc Gyurcsány criticized the demonstrators. However pro-government media claimed, in fact, opposition parties were behind the protests. Pesti Srácok.hu called the organizers as "pseudo-civil activists" as Gulyás was formerly a member of the Socialist Party, while Zoltán Vajda, leader of "Sixty Thousand For the Private Pension Funds" Facebook group was an Együtt–PM candidate during the 2014 municipal elections. In June 2015, the anti-government protesters formed the New Hungarian Republic (ÚMK) civil organization and announced referendum initiatives in a number of issues.

== See also ==
- 2006 protests in Hungary
- Internet tax
- List of protests in the 21st century
