= Lajos Korózs =

Hungarian sociologist and politician

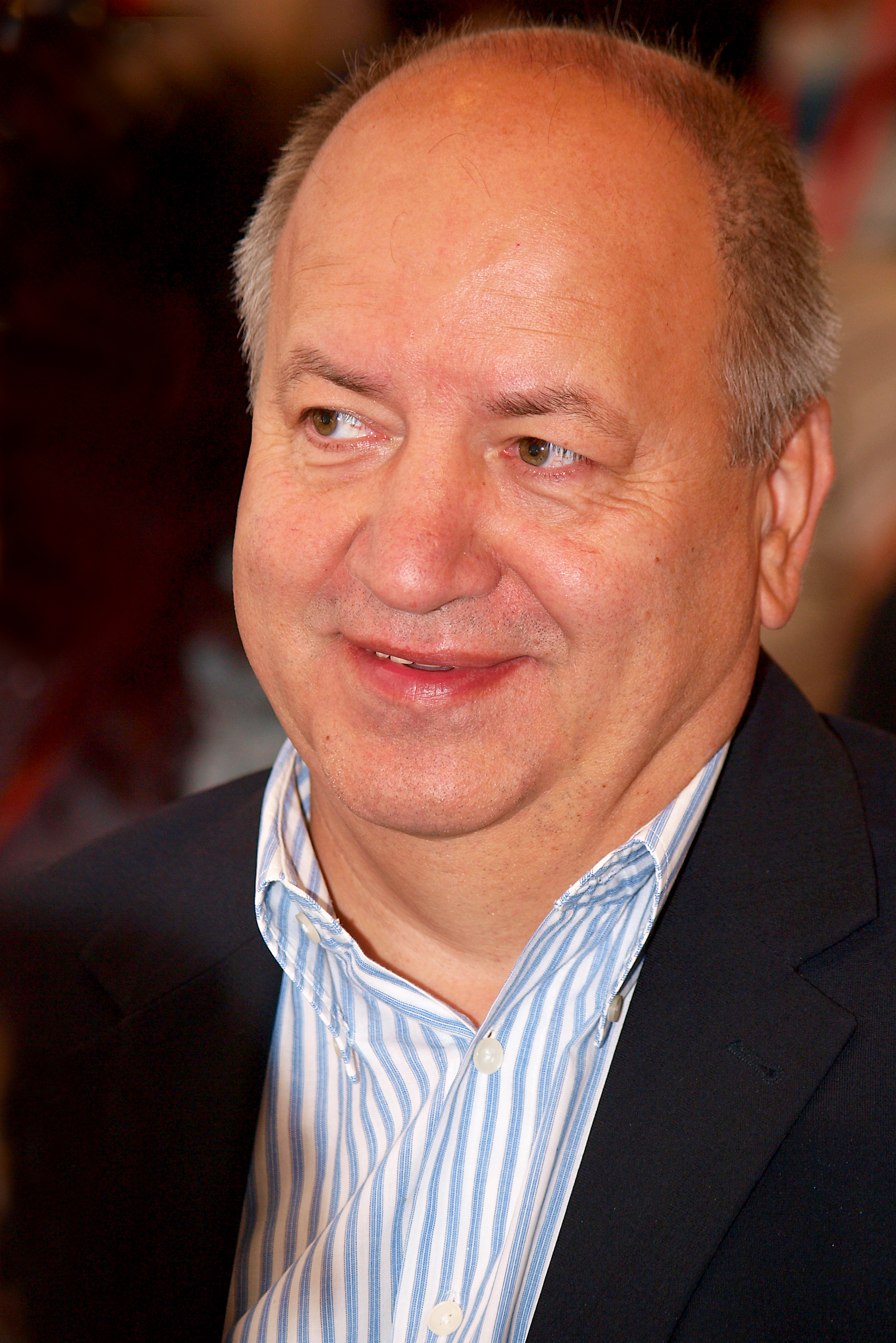

Member of the National Assembly of Hungary
- Incumbent
- Assumed office 2018

Personal details
- Born: September 7, 1958 (age 68) Eger, Hungary
- Party: Hungarian Socialist Party
- Education: Eötvös Loránd University

Lajos Korózs (born in Eger, Hungary on September 7, 1958) is a Hungarian sociologist and politician. He was a member of parliament in the National Assembly of Hungary (Országgyűlés) between 1994-2010 and 2014-2022. He served as the Chairman of the Parliament's Committee on Public Welfare during his last term.
