= Ákos Hadházy =

Hungarian politician

Ákos Hadházy MP
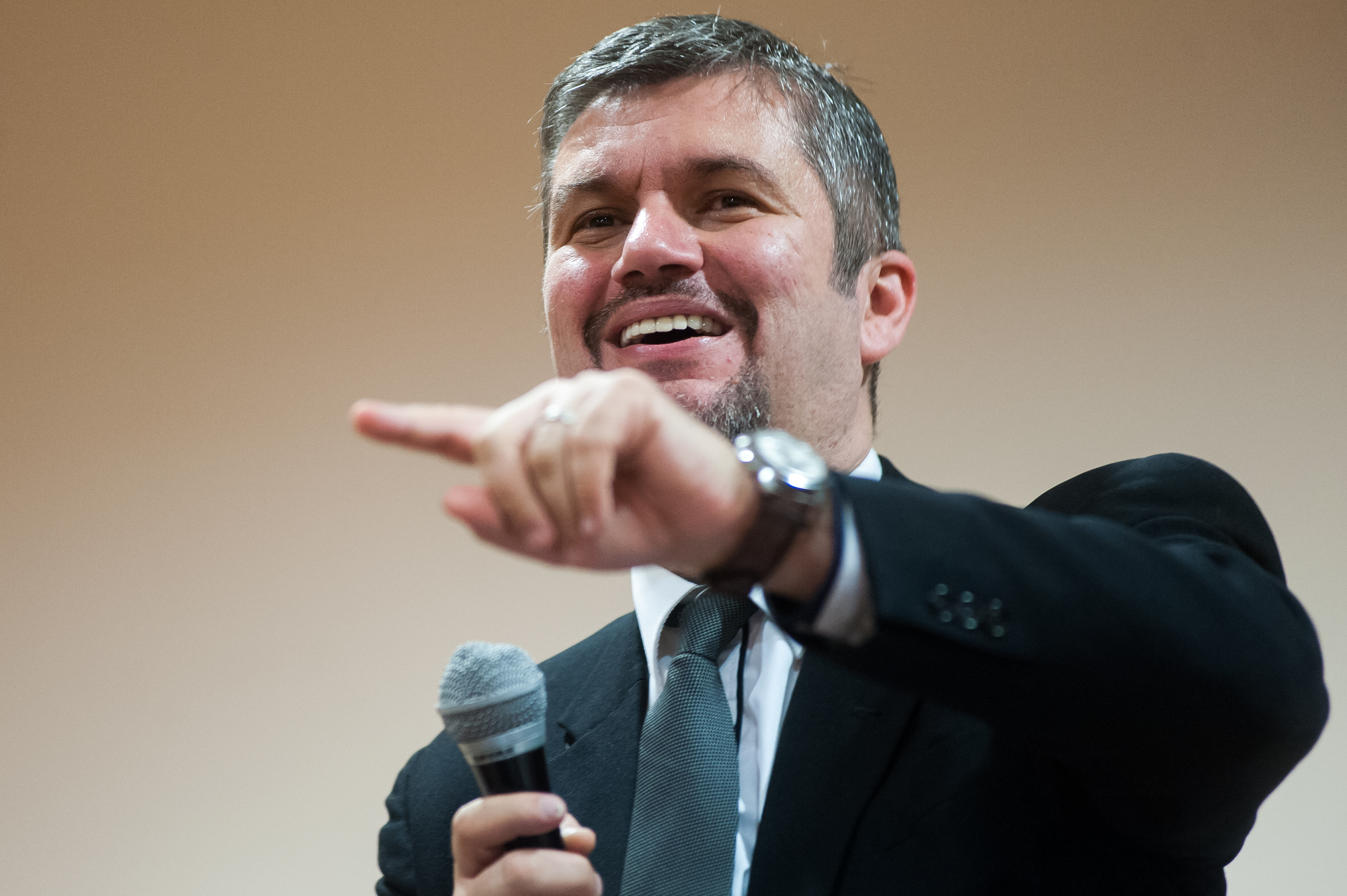
- Hadházy in 2018

Co-President of the Politics Can Be Different
- In office 16 July 2016 – 26 May 2018
- Preceded by: András Schiffer
- Succeeded by: László Lóránt Keresztes

Member of the National Assembly
- In office 12 September 2016 – 8 May 2026
- Succeeded by: György László Velkey

Personal details
- Born: Ákos Ányos Hadházy; 4 March 1974 (age 52) Debrecen, Hungary
- Party: Fidesz (2004–2013); LMP (2014–2018); Independent (2018–2026)
- Other political affiliations: United for Hungary (2020–2022)
- Children: 4
- Education: University of Veterinary Medicine Budapest
- Profession: veterinarian

Ákos Ányos Hadházy (born 4 March 1974) is a Hungarian veterinarian, politician and anti-corruption activist, member of parliament from 2016 to 2026. He was co-president of the Politics Can Be Different (Lehet Más a Politika; LMP) party from 2016 to 2018, and had been a member of the National Assembly (MP) from the party's National List since 2016, and an independent representative for Budapest 8th Constituency since 2022.

== Profession ==
Hadházy was born on 4 March 1974 in Debrecen into a Calvinist family. He finished his secondary studies at Leövey Klára Gimnázium in Pécs. He earned a degree of veterinary at the University of Veterinary Science in 1998. He conducted research for a semester at the University of Giessen, where passed the exams of pathology and food microbiology. He also worked for the Institute of Biology of the Semmelweis University, where he studied cellular biology.

He started his veterinary practice in Szekszárd as an assistant. He worked as a professional manager in the Veterinary Center since 2001. He is the owner of the local central animal hospital since 2009. He specializes in pet internal medicine, laboratory diagnostics and oncology.

== Political career ==
=== Fidesz ===
Ákos Hadházy was a member of the Fidesz party. He became a local representative in Szekszárd during the 2006 local elections. He was a member of the committee on the economy. He was re-elected in the 2010 local elections. After that he served on the committee on culture. He became nationally known in April 2013, after giving an interview to news portal HVG. In it he confirmed the claims by opposition politicians and journals that the ruling Fidesz government awarded national tobacco sales rights based on party connections, and favoring local pro-government politicians including the mayor of Szekszárd, István Horváth. Horváth denied the charges but HVG presented a leaked audio recording from an assembly of the local representative body, which strengthened Hadházy's allegations. The news portal quoted Horváth who said it was most important that "applicants should be committed conservatives" and "socialist supporters must not win [at the tendering process]".

=== LMP ===
After the interview, Hadházy left Fidesz and its caucus in June 2013, and continued his work as an independent representative. Hadházy became affiliated with the left-wing green party Politics Can Be Different (LMP) by late 2013; he was the party's candidate for the individual parliamentary seat of Szekszárd (Tolna County Constituency I) and came to the fourth place during the 2014 parliamentary election. Soon he officially joined the party. Hadházy ran for the mayoral seat of Szekszárd in the October 2014 local elections. Beside LMP, he was supported by the other left-wing parliamentary parties (MSZP, DK and Together) too. He was defeated by Fidesz candidate Rezső Ács with 5 percent difference (Horváth did not run again for the office). After that Hadházy submitted a protest against the result in the Regional Court of Pécs, presenting evidences about organized tours of voters. The submission was well founded and the court annulled the outcome of the election. A new mayoral election was held on 9 November 2014, and Ács again defeated Hadházy, who obtained 42 percent of the vote.

On 18 July 2015, Hadházy was elected to the LMP's leadership. He launched a portal korrupcioinfo.hu and held weekly press conferences, where uncovered numerous alleged corruption cases involved Fidesz politicians and government—close businessmen and bankers. After the LMP's most well-known politician, András Schiffer announced his retirement from politics, Hadházy was elected co-chair of the party on 16 July 2016, alongside Bernadett Szél. He was also elected a Member of Parliament via the party's national list on 12 September 2016, replacing Schiffer. There he became a member of the Legislative Committee. Hadházy criticized the Orbán government's migrant quota referendum campaign in October 2016; he called the referendum as "destructive", because it "whipped up panic-like fear" among the citizens, while distracting from the "collapsing health care" and the "looting of EU funds at state level". He also said Orbán "isolated himself internationally with his populist campaign of provocation".

During the campaign period of the 2018 parliamentary election, Hadházy was a strong advocate for cooperation among left-wing opposition parties despite the LMP's contradictory resolutions. According to press sources, Hadházy negotiated with numerous individual candidates to step back for the benefit of the most prominent opposition candidate, without authorization of the party leadership. As a result, the LMP's ethics committee initiated proceedings against him, but all of these were covered to the public until the election. Despite Tamás Harangozó (MSZP) withdrew his candidacy in favour of Hadházy, he again lost to Fidesz MP István Horváth in Szekszárd constituency. Hadházy became MP via his party's national list. As the governing Fidesz–KDNP won a two-thirds majority in a row for the third time, Hadházy resigned as co-leader of the LMP at the night of the election day. He was interviewed by 24.hu on the next day, where he claimed former party leader András Schiffer and board secretary Róbert Benedek Sallai threatened party candidates with litigation of million HUF not to withdraw their candidacy. Both politicians refused the charges. On 14 April, Sallai physically assaulted Hadházy during an ethics committee meeting. Hadházy filed charges against his party colleague due to the attack.

Hadházy refused to attend the opening session of the new parliamentary term on 8 May 2018, claiming the newly formed national assembly as "illegitimate" due to the result of the controversial national election. He took his parliamentary oath a month later, on 4 June. Meanwhile, Hadházy was marginalized within LMP. On 24 May, the party's disciplinary banned Hadházy from bearing any party positions for the upcoming two years because of his role in the campaign period of the national election, when he negotiated with the representatives of other parties without authorization. Hadházy left the party on 20 June 2018, but he stated he wished to retain his parliamentary mandate.

=== Independent ===
Hadházy defeated the incumbent MP, Tóth Csaba, in the 2021 opposition primary and became the united opposition nominee for the 8th constituency of Budapest. Despite the landslide Fidesz victory nationally in the 2022 parliamentary elections, Hadházy won his district with around 54% of the vote, compared to the 36% of his Fidesz challenger. After the elections, he generated controversy by once again refusing to take his oath of office. Due to Hadházys actions the Parliamentary Rules Committee proposed a rules change which would strip MPs of their seat if they refuse to take their oath of office, opposition aligned media outlets dubbed the new regulation the "Lex Hadházy". Hadházy took his oath half year after the elections, while he held a sign with the text "Stop Propaganda". Hadházy was originally elected as a candidate of Momentum Movement (part of United for Hungary) but did not join to its parliamentary group after the election and remained independent.

In March 2025, Hadházy has started weekly demonstrations in Budapest to oppose government attacks on civil liberties – including the new law banning the June 28 Pride march in the Hungarian capital. In the summer of 2025, Hadházy has made multiple posts on social media about PM Orbán's alleged manor Hatvanpuszta, which he has called a "symbol of lies". He also organized demonstrations there at two occasions, in August and October. PM Orbán has called Hadházy a "fool" for his actions regarding Hatvanpuszta. In October 2025, his weekly demonstrations have officially ended due to lack of results. Despite this, Hadházy claimed he will still continue protesting, but with no speeches. Hadházy partly blamed the opposition leader Péter Magyar for accepting Orbán's "dirty rules of election".

Hadházy ran as an independent candidate in Budapest 6th constituency during the 2026 Hungarian parliamentary election, but came only to the third place after Tisza candidate György László Velkey and Fidesz candidate Béla Radics. Hadházy announced his retirement from politics thereafter.

Party political offices
Preceded by András Schiffer; Bernadett Szél	Co-President of the Politics Can Be Different alongside Bernadett Szél; 2016–2018	Succeeded by László Lóránt Keresztes; Bernadett Szél
