= László Lóránt Keresztes =

Hungarian economist and politician

László Keresztes Lóránt
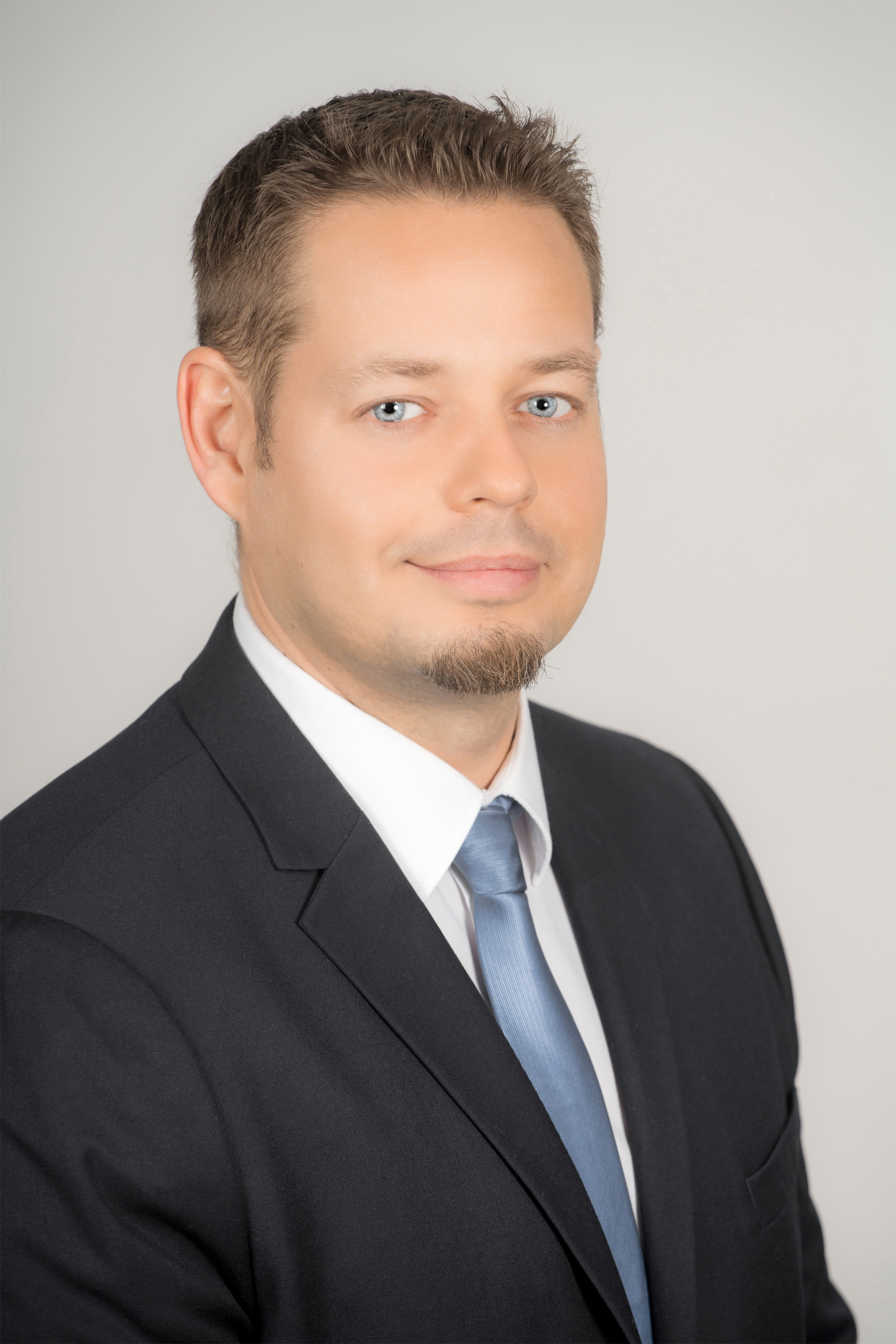

Member of the National Assembly of Hungary
- Incumbent
- Assumed office 8 May 2018

Personal details
- Born: 22 June 1975 (age 50) Kaposvár
- Party: LMP – Hungary's Green Party

László Lóránt Keresztes (born in Kaposvár, Hungary on 22 June 1975) is a Hungarian economist and politician. He has been a member of parliament in the National Assembly of Hungary (Országgyűlés) since May 2018.

== Early life and career ==
He is from a Roman Catholic family with a centuries-old history in Baranya. His father is an hydraulic engineer and his mother is a social worker. He attended the University of Pécs and graduated in 2008. He also holds a doctorate degree in economic geography. In 2010, Lehet Más took over the management of the Baranya County organization of Politika. Between 2010 and 2014 he was elected the representative of Pécs. On both occasions, the LMP nominated him as mayor of Pécs. From 2015 to 2018, he was a member of the Committee of the Regions of the European Union. He also served on the Economic Policy (ECON) and Natural Resources and Agriculture (NAT) Committees.

In 2016, Krisztián Magyar, the journalist of Magyar Narancs, ranked László Keresztes among the 8 best rural opposition politicians in an article. In the 2018 parliamentary elections in Hungary, LMP is a candidate in the 1st OEVK of Baranya County. He won a parliamentary seat from 6th place on the party's national list. Keresztes was appointed co-chair of the LMP on 26 May 2018. On 4 September 2018, he was elected leader of the LMP parliamentary group.

He was appointed member of the Legislative Committee of the Parliament. In the Hungarian pre-election in 2021, the LMP was elected in Baranya County 2nd constituency also based in Pécs.

Keresztes left LMP on 25 August 2024, but remained a member of the party's parliamentary group in order to avoid its dissolution.

Party political offices
Preceded by Ákos Hadházy; Bernadett Szél	Co-President of the Politics Can Be Different alongside Bernadett Szél (2018), and Márta Demeter (2018–2019); 2018–2019	Succeeded by János Kendernay; Erzsébet Schmuck
National Assembly of Hungary
Preceded by Bernadett Szél	Leader of the LMP parliamentary group 2018–2022	Succeeded by Péter Ungár
