= LMP – Hungary's Green Party =

Hungarian political party

LMP – Hungary's Green Party LMP – Magyarország Zöld Pártja
- Abbreviation: LMP
- Co-Presidents: Péter Ungár; Katalin Szabó-Kellner
- Founded: 26 February 2009
- Headquarters: 1136 Budapest, Hegedűs Gyula u. 36.
- Youth wing: The Future Can Be Different
- Ideology: Green liberalism Syncretic politics
- Political position: Centre to centre-left
- European affiliation: European Green Party (until 2024)
- International affiliation: Global Greens
- Colours: Green
- National Assembly: 0 / 199
- European Parliament: 0 / 21
- County Assemblies: 0 / 381
- General Assembly of Budapest: 1 / 33

Website
- lehetmas.hu

LMP – Hungary's Green Party (Hungarian: LMP – Magyarország Zöld Pártja [ˈɛlɛmpeː ˈmɒɟɒrorsaːɡ ˈzøld ˈpaːrcɒ]) previously known as Politics Can Be Different (Hungarian: Lehet Más a Politika [ˈlɛhɛt ˈmaːʃ ˈɒː ˈpolitikɒ], LMP) until 2020, is a green-liberal political party in Hungary. Founded in 2009, it was one of four parties to win seats in the National Assembly in the 2010 parliamentary election. It is a member of the Global Greens, and formerly a member of the European Green Party.

== History ==
Former logo

=== Foundation and electoral success ===
The party was preceded by a non-governmental organization social initiative founded in 2008, with the purpose of reforming Hungarian politics. LMP shares common ideologies with most green parties. Key issues are environmental protection, sustainable development and the fight against corruption in the current political elite. LMP highlights what they see as the pointlessness of the current partisan division between the left and right-wing forces, and their principle is deliberative democracy, which they believe decreases the distance between the people and the political elite.

The public faces of the organization were András Schiffer, a former member of the Hungarian Civil Liberties Union (HCLU) and Védegylet, and Bernadett Szél, an economist and NGO worker at the party's formation. The leading figures also included Benedek Jávor, university professor in environmental law and a founder of Védegylet, Gábor Scheiring, an economist, and Tímea Szabó, a humanitarian worker, who was to head the list presented for the 2009 European Parliament elections. In 2009, LMP received the official endorsement of the European Green Party.

At the 2009 European Parliament elections the party garnered 75,522 votes, (or 2.61% of the total votes), which was less than the 5% needed to gain a seat for the 2009–2014 cycle, though beating the 2.16% received by Alliance of Free Democrats (SZDSZ), one of the parties already in the national parliament.

In the 2010 parliamentary elections, the party achieved 7.48% in the first electoral round, thereby clearing the 5 percent electoral threshold, gaining 16 seats in the parliament, though it did not obtain any direct-representational seats. In the local elections of 3 October 2010, LMP gained 54 seats in local city councils, with at least one representative in most of the district councils of the capital, three seats in the General Assembly of Budapest, as well as in a few other cities around the country. Gábor Ivády was the only party member to be elected mayor of a town; however he left LMP on 21 October 2010.

Since its establishment and 2010 national election, LMP was kept under pressure by the Hungarian Socialist Party (MSZP) to achieve some kind of electoral compromise and cooperation against Viktor Orbán's controversial government. For instance, during the by-election in the 2nd District of Budapest in 2011, MSZP urged the LMP's candidate Gergely Karácsony to withdraw in Katalin Lévai's favor, but the Green party did not do this. The leadership of the LMP positioned the party to the centre, and, as a newcomer, rejected both Fidesz and MSZP's politics. András Schiffer also criticized the previous Socialist cabinets, blaming Ferenc Gyurcsány's disastrous governance for having Fidesz won a two-thirds majority in 2010. However prominent politicians in LMP were divided on the issue of cooperation. In July 2011, Karácsony proposed an election coalition between Jobbik, LMP and MSZP, to change certain laws enacted by Fidesz. He cited Éva Tétényi's case, as a precedent of how such a proposal could work. Politics Can Be Different became a full member of the European Green Party (EGP) in November 2011.

=== Party split ===
During the party's congress in November 2012, LMP decided not to join Together 2014, the planned electoral alliance of opposition parties and movements led by Gordon Bajnai. As a result, Benedek Jávor, a proponent of the agreement, resigned from his position of parliamentary group leader. Jávor and his supporters (including Tímea Szabó and Gergely Karácsony) founded a platform within the party, called "Dialogue for Hungary" on 26 November 2012. The platform argued in favour of conclusion of an electoral agreement with Bajnai's movement to replace "Orbán's regime". Later that day Schiffer, who did not support the cooperation with Bajnai, was elected leader of the LMP parliamentary group for second time.

In January 2013, the LMP's congress rejected again the electoral cooperation with other opposition parties, including Together 2014. As a result, members of the party's "Dialogue for Hungary" platform left LMP to form a new political organization. Benedek Jávor announced the eight leaving MPs will not resign from their parliamentary seats. Seven parliamentarians remained in the party, Jávor said negotiations are required for the continued operation of the parliamentary group, according to the house rules, which requires 12 seats. Schiffer did not call the secession as a party split, because, he argued, less than 10% of the LMP's membership decided to leave the party and joined Jávor's new initiative. The leaving MPs established Dialogue for Hungary as an officially registered party in March 2013. After the failed negotiations, the eight MPs also left the parliamentary group which then broken up according to the house rules of the National Assembly.

=== Recovery ===
The 4K! – Fourth Republic! party offered electoral alliance to the LMP. Party leader András Istvánffy called the developments that took place in opposition as "a cleansing process, which will separate those who seek to restore pre-2010 conditions and those who want real regime change." However LMP refused the 4K! party's cooperation offer in September 2013.

Schiffer and Bernadett Szél were elected co-presidents of the LMP during the party's congress on 24 March 2013. The seven MPs of the party were able to re-establish the LMP's caucus on 1 September 2013, after the decision of the Committee on Immunity, Incompatibility and Mandate. The old-new group became the first caucus, where the majority were women, for the first time in Hungary.

Politics Can Be Different received five seats, as it barely jumped over the 5% threshold in the 2014 parliamentary election. The party reached the same result in the 2014 European Parliament election, when it received 5.04% of the votes and sent one representative to the European Parliament. MEP Tamás Meszerics joined The Greens–European Free Alliance (Greens/EFA). In August 2014, LMP and 4K! agreed to a cooperation in some electoral districts in Budapest during the 2014 local elections. The candidate for Budapest mayor, Antal Csárdi, took just fourth place after István Tarlós, Lajos Bokros and Gábor Staudt. The party collected fewer votes with 50,000 than results of four years ago in the whole country. Virtually LMP remained a metropolitan organization, with only an insignificant representation in the countryside. In a different point of view, LMP largely regained the positions, which had been lost during the party split in early 2013, for instance, then all three representatives in the General Assembly of Budapest joined Dialogue for Hungary.

On 18 July 2015, Schiffer and Szél were re-elected co-presidents of the party. Ákos Hadházy, a former Fidesz member, who revealed the government's tobacco shop corruption scandal, was also elected to the LMP's leadership. The party's most well-known politician, Schiffer announced his retirement from politics on 31 May 2016. After the resignation of Erzsébet Schmuck, Szél was elected leader of the LMP parliamentary group on 16 February 2017.

=== 2018 and 2022 parliamentary elections ===
In September 2017, Bernadett Szél was nominated the party's candidate to the position of prime minister for the upcoming parliamentary election. In the same month, former socialist MP Márta Demeter joined the LMP's parliamentary group, but she is not member of the party. During that time, Bernadett Szél was nominated the party's candidate to the position of prime minister for the upcoming parliamentary election. In December 2017, Bernadett Szél and György Gémesi agreed, that the Politics Can Be Different and the New Start ran together in the 2018 Hungarian parliamentary election.

In these parliamentary election, LMP won 7.06 per cent of the votes and returned 8 members in the parliament (including one single-member constituency in Budapest). After these elections, internal conflicts led to resignation of Bernadett Szél as party's co-chair. Party's support also declined. For example, the party in 2019 European Parliament election achieved almost identical results as in 2009.

In 2020, the changed its name to the LMP – Hungary's Green Party.

During the 2022 parliamentary election, the LMP was a member of the United for Hungary, a broad coalition of parties seeking to oust the Orbán government, winning 7.0% of the vote and 8 seats.

=== Split with the opposition ===
Following the 2022 election, Péter Ungár (whose mother is a key figure in Fidesz) became a co-chair of the party. Under Ungár, the party shifted away from the other opposition parties, and in the 2024 Budapest mayoral election, LMP endorsed the Fidesz-linked candidate, Dávid Vitézy. This move saw them officially suspended from the European Green Party (EGP) in March 2024. LMP left the EGP in September 2024, citing disagreements over policy.

Following the local elections and European parliament elections in 2024, several figures in the party left. In February 2025, the party dropped to three MPs, meaning they did not meet the five MP threshold to form a parliamentary group.

== Ideology and platform ==
The party's political position has been widely described as centrist and centre-left. Other sources describe LMP and their voters as "hard to evaluate", populist, and inclusive of centre-right elements. The party has been described as combining some liberal and conservative positions and support, with the party taking a less progressive position following the split of Dialogue for Hungary party.

== Co-leaders ==
Term	Male co-chair	Female co-chair
2013–2016	András Schiffer	Bernadett Szél
2016–2018	Ákos Hadházy	Bernadett Szél
2018–2019	László Lóránt Keresztes	Márta Demeter
2019–2020	János Kendernay	Erzsébet Schmuck
2020–2022	Máté Kanász-Nagy	Erzsébet Schmuck
2022–2024	Péter Ungár	Erzsébet Schmuck
2024–	Péter Ungár	Katalin Szabó-Kellner

== Election results ==
=== National Assembly ===
Election	Leader	SMCs		MMCs		Seats	+/–	Status
Election	Leader	Votes	%	Votes	%	Seats	+/–	Status
2010	András Schiffer; Bernadett Szél	259,220	5.07% (#4)	383,876	7.48% (#4)	16 / 386	New	Opposition
Election	Leader	Constituency		Party list		Seats	+/–	Status
Election	Leader	Votes	%	Votes	%	Seats	+/–	Status
2014	András Schiffer; Bernadett Szél	244,191	4.97% (#4)	269,414	5.34% (#4)	5 / 199	▼11	Opposition
2018	Ákos Hadházy; Bernadett Szél	312,731	5.68% (#5)	404,429	7.06% (#4)	8 / 199	▲3	Opposition
2022 (Note: Run within United for Hungary coalition.)	Máté Kanász-Nagy; Erzsébet Schmuck	1,983,708	36.90% (#2)	1,947,331	34.44% (#2)	5 / 199	▼3	Opposition
2026	Péter Ungár; Katalin Szabó-Kellner	163	0.00 (#12)	Did not contest (Endorsed TISZA)		0 / 199	▼5	Extra-parliamentary

=== European Parliament ===
Election	List leader	Votes	%	Seats	+/−	EP Group
2009 (Note: Run in a joint list with HP.)	Tímea Szabó	75,522	2.61 (#5)	0 / 22	New	−
2014	Tamás Meszerics	116,904	5.04 (#6)	1 / 21	▲1	Greens/EFA
2019	Gábor Vágó	75,498	2.18 (#8)	0 / 21	▼1	−
2024	Péter Ungár	39,646	0.87 (#8)	0 / 21	0	−

== See also ==
- List of political parties in Hungary
- Ökofeszt
