= Békés County 4th constituency =

Hungarian national legislative constituency

Békes County 4th constituency (Orosháza)
- Constituency for the National Assembly
- Location of Békés county 04 within Békés county

- Location of Békés county within Hungary
- County: Békés
- Electorate: 73,242 (2018)
- Major settlements: Orosháza

Current constituency
- Created: 2011
- Party: Tisza Party
- Member: Mária Gurzó
- Created from: Constituency no. 2; Constituency no. 6; Constituency no. 7
- Elected: 2026

The 4th constituency of Békés County (Hungarian: Békés megyei 04. számú országgyűlési egyéni választókerület) is one of the single member constituencies of the National Assembly, the national legislature of Hungary. The constituency standard abbreviation: Békés 04. OEVK.

Since 2026, it has been represented by Mária Gurzó of the Tisza Party party alliance.

== Geography ==
The 4th constituency is located in the southern part of Békés County.

=== List of municipalities ===
The constituency includes the following municipalities:

1. Almáskamarás
2. Battonya
3. Békéssámson
4. Csanádapáca
5. Dombegyház
6. Dombiratos
7. Gádoros
8. Kardoskút
9. Kaszaper
10. Kevermes
11. Kisdombegyház
12. Kunágota
13. Lőkösháza
14. Magyarbánhegyes
15. Magyardombegyház
16. Medgyesegyháza
17. Medgyesbodzás
18. Mezőhegyes
19. Mezőkovácsháza
20. Nagybánhegyes
21. Nagykamarás
22. Nagyszénás
23. Orosháza
24. Pusztaföldvár
25. Pusztaottlaka
26. Tótkomlós
27. Végegyháza

== History ==
The current 4th constituency of Békés County was created in 2011 and contains the pre-2011 6th and 7th constituencies and part of the pre-2011 2nd constituency of Békés County. Its borders have not changed since its creation.

== Members ==
The constituency was first represented by György Simonka of the Fidesz from 2014 to 2022. He was succeeded by Norbert Erdős of the Fidesz in 2022. In the 2026 election, Mária Gurzó of the Tisza Party was elected representative.

Election	Member	Party	%	Ref.
2014	György Simonka	Fidesz	45.39	
2018	György Simonka	Fidesz	43.15	
2022	Norbert Erdős	Fidesz	49.82	
2026	Mária Gurzó	Tisza Party	54.79	
