= Mezőkovácsháza District =

Mezőkovácsháza District Mezőkovácsházai járás
- Districts of Hungary
- Coat of arms

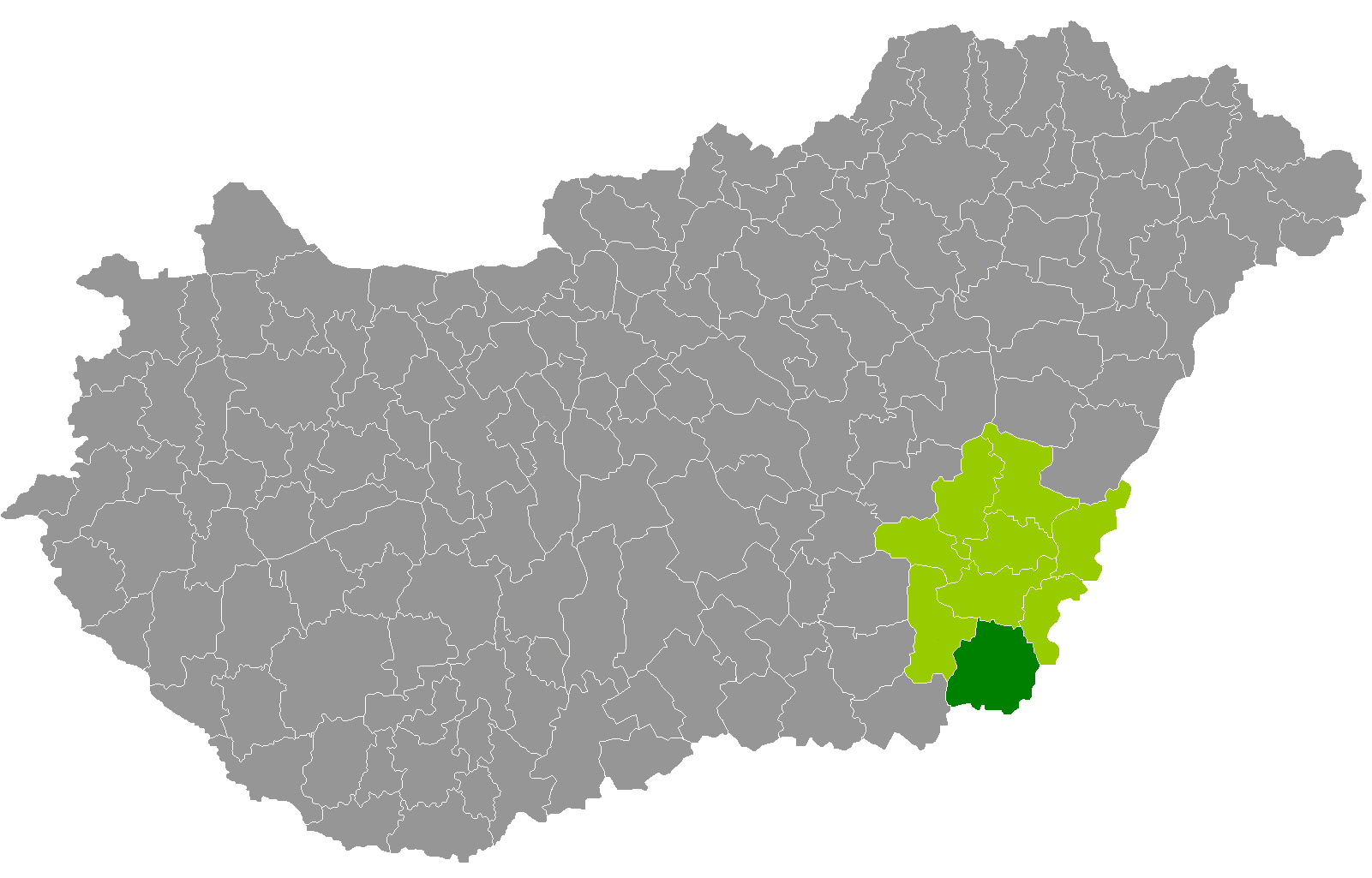
- Mezőkovácsháza District within Hungary and Békés County.
- Coordinates: 46.41°N 20.91°E
- Country: Hungary
- County: Békés
- District seat: Mezőkovácsháza

Area
  - Total: 881.49 km^{2} (340.35 sq mi)
  - Rank: 1st in Békés

Population (2011 census)
  - Total: 40,550
  - Rank: 4th in Békés
  - Density: 46/km^{2} (120/sq mi)

Mezőkovácsháza (Hungarian: Mezőkovácsházai járás) is a district in southern part of Békés County. Mezőkovácsháza is also the name of the town where the district seat is found. The district is located in the Southern Great Plain Statistical Region.

== Geography ==
Mezőkovácsháza District borders with Békéscsaba District to the north, Gyula District to the northeast, the Romanian county of Arad to the east and south, Makó District (Csongrád County) and Orosháza District to the west. The number of the inhabited places in Mezőkovácsháza District is 18.

== Municipalities ==
The district has 4 towns, 2 large villages and 12 villages. (ordered by population, as of 1 January 2012)

- Almáskamarás (835)
- **Battonya** (5,565)
- Dombegyház (1,943)
- Dombiratos (526)
- Kaszaper (1,963)
- Kevermes (1,937)
- Kisdombegyház (457)
- Kunágota (2,559)
- Magyarbánhegyes (2,374)
- Magyardombegyház (201)
- Medgyesbodzás (1,026)
- **Medgyesegyháza** (3,691)
- **Mezőhegyes** (4,994)
- **Mezőkovácsháza** (6,049) – district seat
- Nagybánhegyes (1,129)
- Nagykamarás (1,366)
- Pusztaottlaka (356)
- Végegyháza (1,305)

The bolded municipalities are cities, italics municipalities are large villages.

== Demographics ==
Religion in Mezőkovácsháza District (2011 census)
1. Catholic Church (38.5%)
2. Greek Catholicism (0.20%)
3. Calvinism (5.60%)
4. Lutheranism (3.20%)
5. Orthodoxy (1.60%)
6. Other religions (1.20%)
7. Non-religious (26.4%)
8. Atheists (0.90%)
9. Undeclared (22.4%)

In 2011, it had a population of 40,550 and the population density was 46/km^{2}.

Year	County population	Change
2011	40,550	n/a

=== Ethnicity ===
Besides the Hungarian majority, the main minorities are the Romanian and Roma (approx. 1,000), German (500), Slovak (400) and Serb (350).

Total population (2011 census): 40,550
Ethnic groups (2011 census): Identified themselves: 38,098 persons:

- Hungarians: 34,751 (91.21%)
- Romanians: 1,021 (2.68%)
- Gypsies: 911 (2.39%)
- Germans: 488 (1.28%)
- Slovaks: 402 (1.06%)
- Others and indefinable: 525 (1.38%)

Approx. 2,500 persons in Mezőkovácsháza District did not declare their ethnic group at the 2011 census.

=== Religion ===
Religious adherence in the county according to 2011 census:

- Catholic – 15,730 (Roman Catholic – 15,633; Greek Catholic – 94);
- Reformed – 2,272;
- Evangelical – 1,280;
- Orthodox – 630;
- other religions – 487;
- Non-religious – 10,704;
- Atheism – 350;
- Undeclared – 9,097.

== Gallery ==
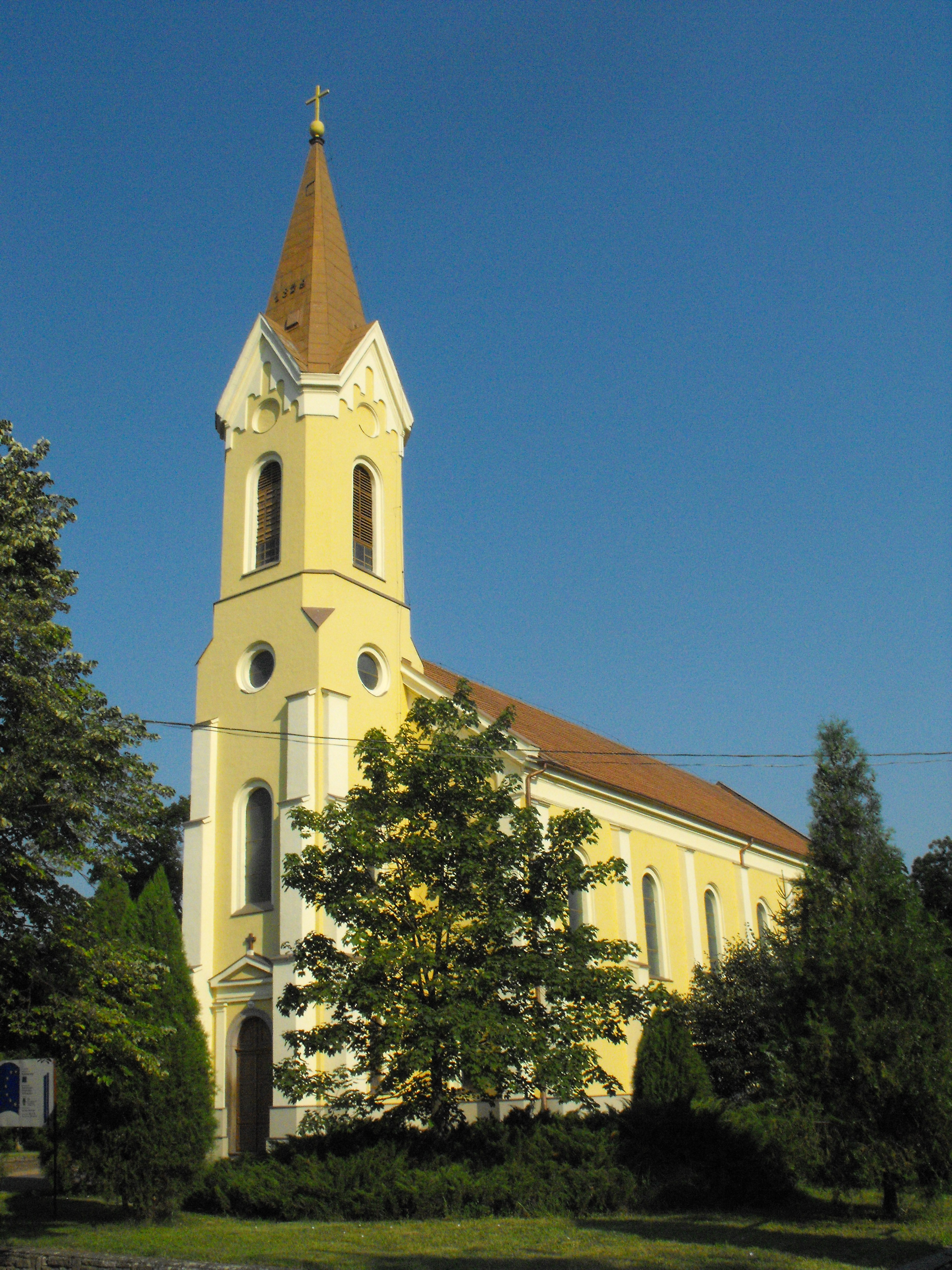
Mezőkovácsháza, the district seat

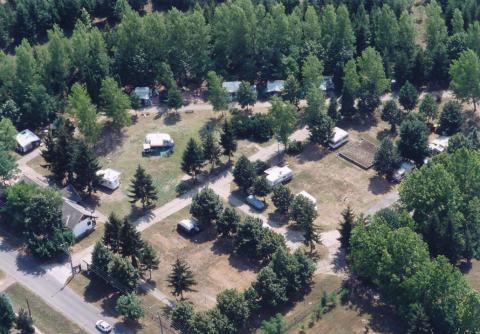
Aerial view of Mezőkovácsháza

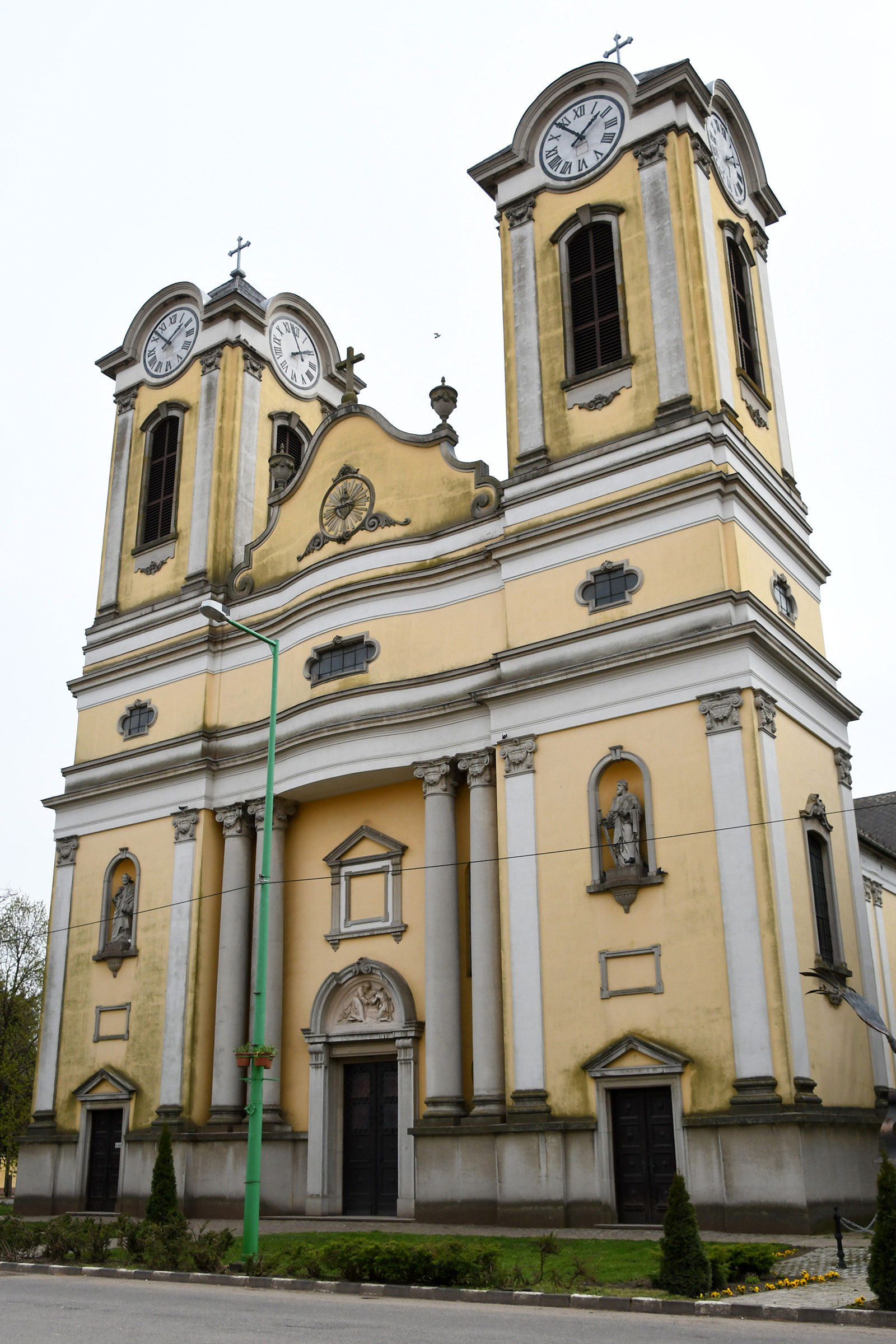
Holy Trinity Church in Battonya

== See also ==
- List of cities and towns of Hungary
