= György Simonka =

Hungarian businessman and politician

Member of the National Assembly
- In office 14 May 2010 – 1 May 2022

Personal details
- Born: 14 March 1974 (age 52) Medgyesegyháza, Hungary
- Party: Fidesz
- Profession: politician

György Simonka (born March 14, 1974) is a Hungarian businessman and politician, member of the National Assembly (MP) for Mezőkovácsháza (Békés County Constituency VII) from 2010 to 2014, and for Orosháza (Békés County Constituency IV) from 2014 to 2022. He was elected mayor of Pusztaottlaka in October 2006, he held that office until 2014.

Simonka was a member of the Committee on Consumer Protection from 14 May 2010 to 5 May 2014. He was a member of the Committee on Sustainable Development from 6 May 2014 to 1 May 2022.

Due to a high-profile corruption scandal involving him (see below), Simonka announced in December 2021 he will not run as a candidate in the upcoming 2022 Hungarian parliamentary election. He was re-elected mayor of Pusztaottlaka during the 2024 Hungarian local elections.

He ran in the 2026 Hungarian parliamentary elections as an independent, securing 2.72% of the vote in the Bekes County 4th constituency, garnering 46.3% in Pusztaottlaka.

== Criminal charge ==
In 2016, the National Tax and Customs Administration (NAV) launched an investigation against him on suspicion of crimes related to European Union and Hungarian budget funds.

In October 2018, the Chief Prosecutor's Office filed a lawsuit against Simonka and 32 others in a charge of tax fraud in a criminal organization causing particularly serious financial damage against the national budget and other criminal offenses. Upon the request of the Chief Prosecutor's Office, the National Assembly suspended his immunity.

As part of a criminal lawsuit that began in February 2021, the prosecutor's office accused Simonka of embezzling funds from the European Union and the Hungarian budget with the help of company networks that fruit and vegetable producers could have claimed. According to the accusation, between 2009 and 2015, 1.4 billion HUF of public funds were stolen by a circle of organized crime led by Simonka. Therefore, the prosecutor's office offered him eight and a half years in prison and a confiscation of 850 million HUF if he admits to the indictment. Simonka did not do that.
