= Battonya gas field =

Natural gas field in Hungary

Battonya
- Location within Hungary
- Country: Hungary
- Region: Békés County
- Offshore/onshore: onshore
- Coordinates: 46.28333°N 21.01667°E
- Operator: MOL Group

Field history
- Discovery: 1962
- Start of development: 1962
- Start of production: 1965

Production
- Current production of gas: 500×10^{3} m^{3}/d 17.8×10^{6} cu ft/d 0.178×10^{9} m^{3}/a (6.3×10^{9} cu ft/a)
- Estimated gas in place: 4.2×10^{9} m^{3} 150×10^{9} cu ft

The Battonya gas field is a natural gas field located in Battonya, Békés County. It was discovered in 1962 and developed by and MOL Group. It began production in 1965 and produces natural gas and condensates. The total proven reserves of the Battonya gas field are around 150 billion cubic feet (4.2 billion m³), and production is slated to be around 17.8 million cubic feet/day (0.5×10^{5}m³) in 2010.
