= Orosháza District =

Coordinates: 46.567662679036026°N 20.651054622913687°E

Orosháza District Orosházi járás
- Districts of Hungary
- Coat of arms

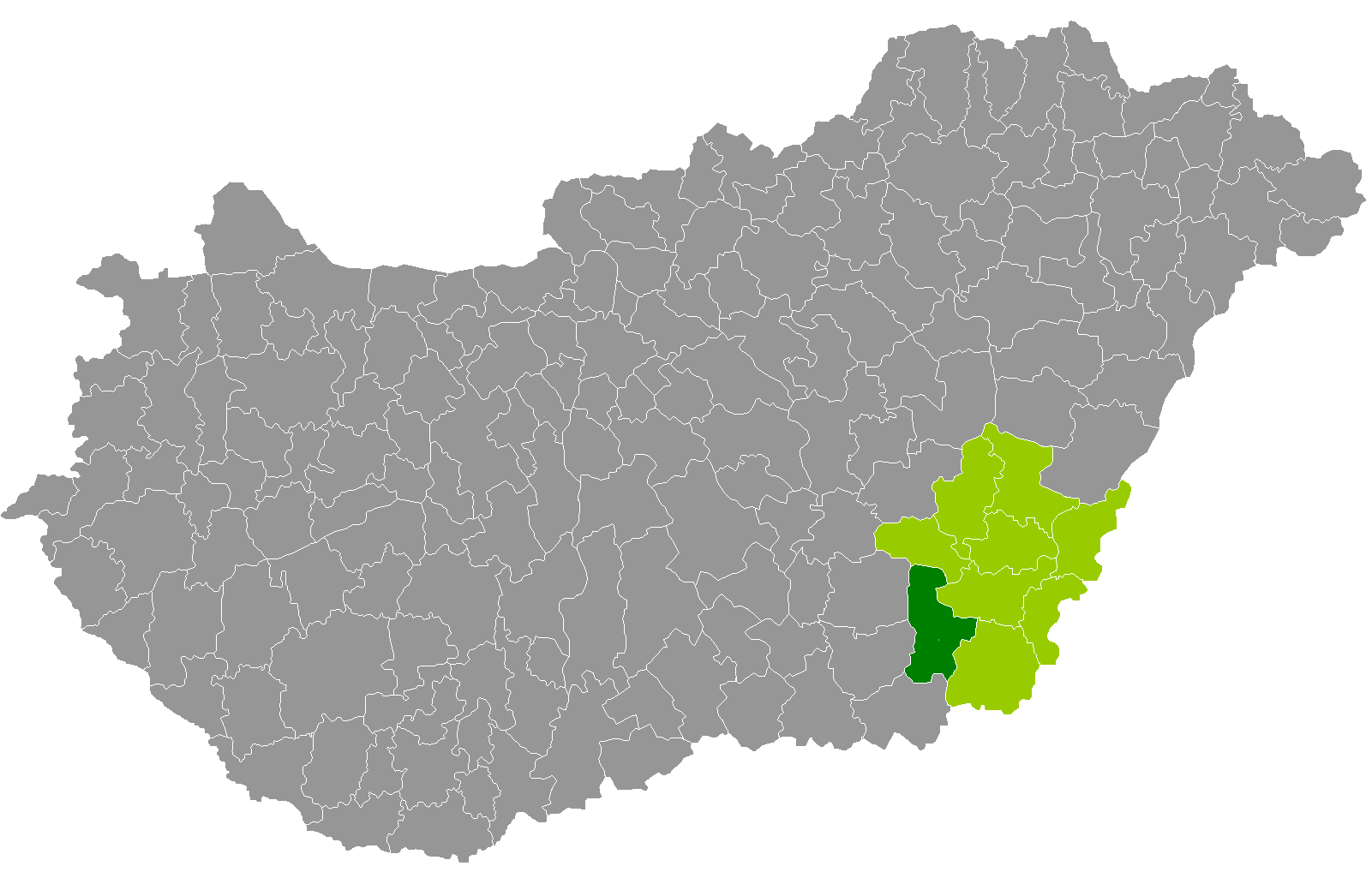
- Orosháza District within Hungary and Békés County.
- Country: Hungary
- County: Békés
- District seat: Orosháza

Area
  - Total: 717.18 km^{2} (276.90 sq mi)
  - Rank: 2nd in Békés

Population (2011 census)
  - Total: 51,482
  - Rank: 2nd in Békés
  - Density: 72/km^{2} (190/sq mi)

Orosháza (Hungarian: Orosházi járás) is a district in south-western part of Békés County. Orosháza is also the name of the town where the district seat is found. The district is located in the Southern Great Plain Statistical Region.

== Geography ==
Orosháza District is bordered by Szarvas District to the north, Békéscsaba District and Mezőkovácsháza District to the east, Makó District (Csongrád County) to the south, Hódmezővásárhely District and Szentes District (Csongrád County) to the west. There are eight inhabited places in Orosháza District.

== Municipalities ==
The district has two towns, two large villages and four villages. (ordered by population, as of 1 January 2012)

- Békéssámson (2,318)
- Csanádapáca (2,617)
- Gádoros (3,555)
- Kardoskút (885)
- Nagyszénás (5,070)
- **Orosháza** (28,910) – district seat
- Pusztaföldvár (1,700)
- **Tótkomlós** (5,780)

The bolded municipalities are cities, italics municipalities are large villages.

== Demographics ==
Religion in Orosháza District (2011 census)
1. Catholic Church (20.3%)
2. Greek Catholicism (0.20%)
3. Lutheranism (13.5%)
4. Calvinism (4.50%)
5. Other religions (1.80%)
6. Non-religious (31.1%)
7. Atheists (1.30%)
8. Undeclared (27.3%)

In 2011, it had a population of 51,482 and the population density of 72 per square kilometre (190/sq mi).

Year	County population	Change
2011	51,482	n/a

=== Ethnicity ===
Besides the Hungarian majority, the main minorities are the Slovak (approx. 1,500), Roma (650), German (250) and Romanian (150).

Total population (2011 census): 51,482
Ethnic groups (2011 census): Identified themselves: 45,712 persons:

- Hungarians: 42,825 (93.68%)
- Slovaks: 1,460 (3.19%)
- Gypsies: 645 (1.41%)
- Others and indefinable: 782 (1.71%)

Approx. 6,000 persons in Orosháza District did not declare their ethnic group at the 2011 census.

=== Religion ===
Religious adherence in the county according to 2011 census:

- Catholic – 10,548 (Roman Catholic – 10,469; Greek Catholic – 77)
- Evangelical – 6,958
- Reformed – 2,329
- other religions – 920
- Non-religious – 16,045
- Atheism – 654
- Undeclared – 14,028

== Gallery ==
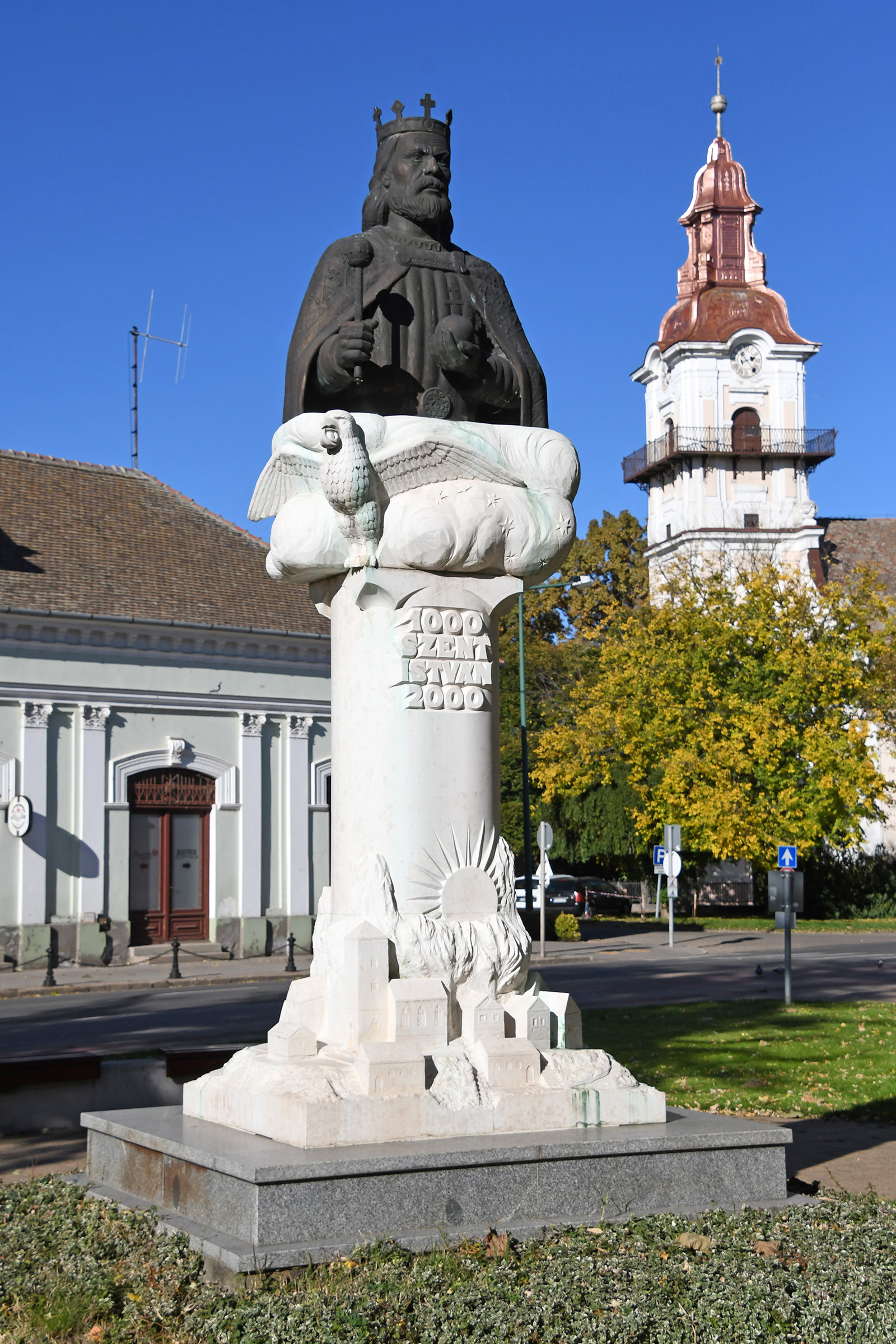
Orosháza, the biggest Hungarian village

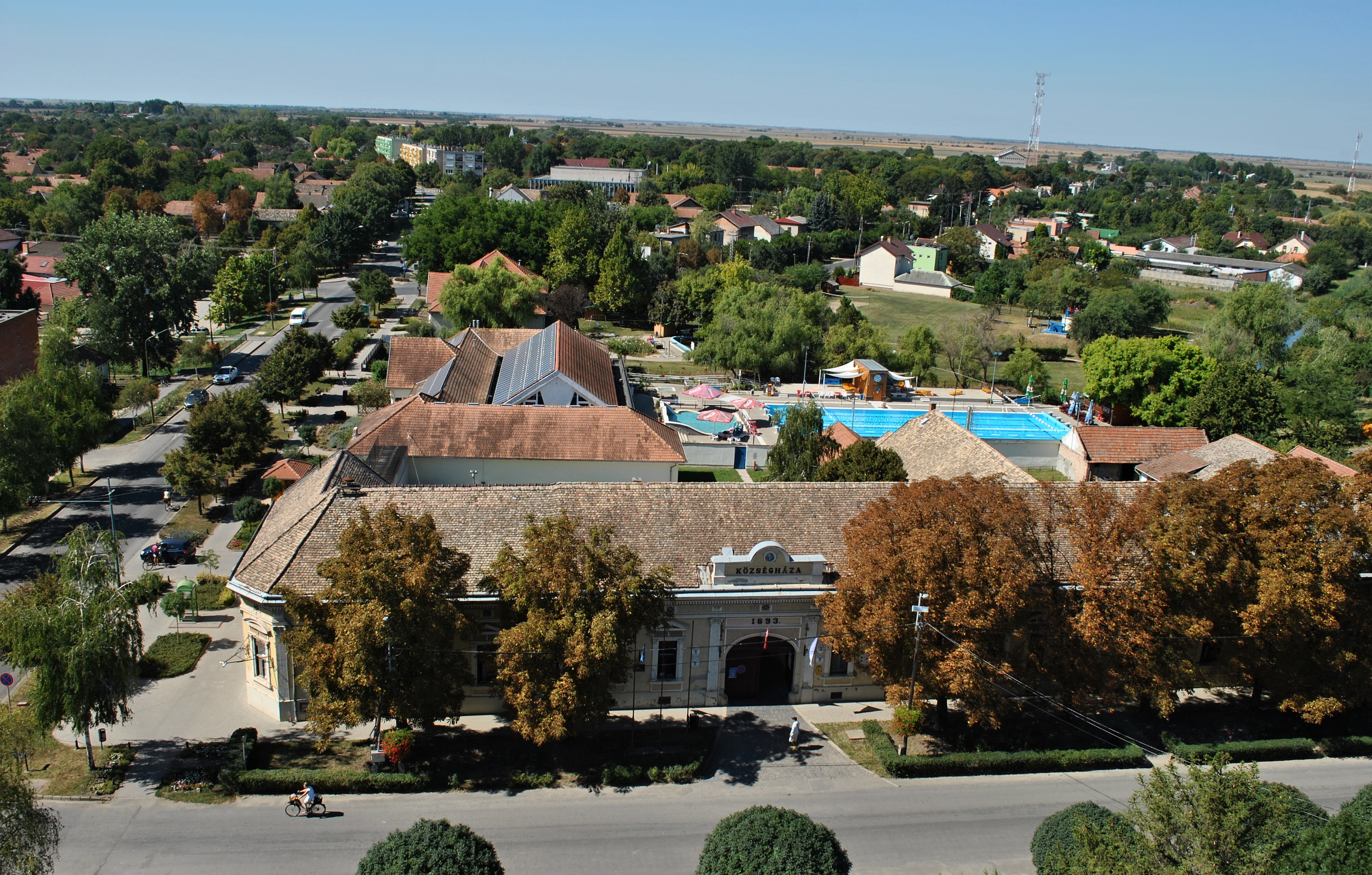
Aerial view of Tótkomlós

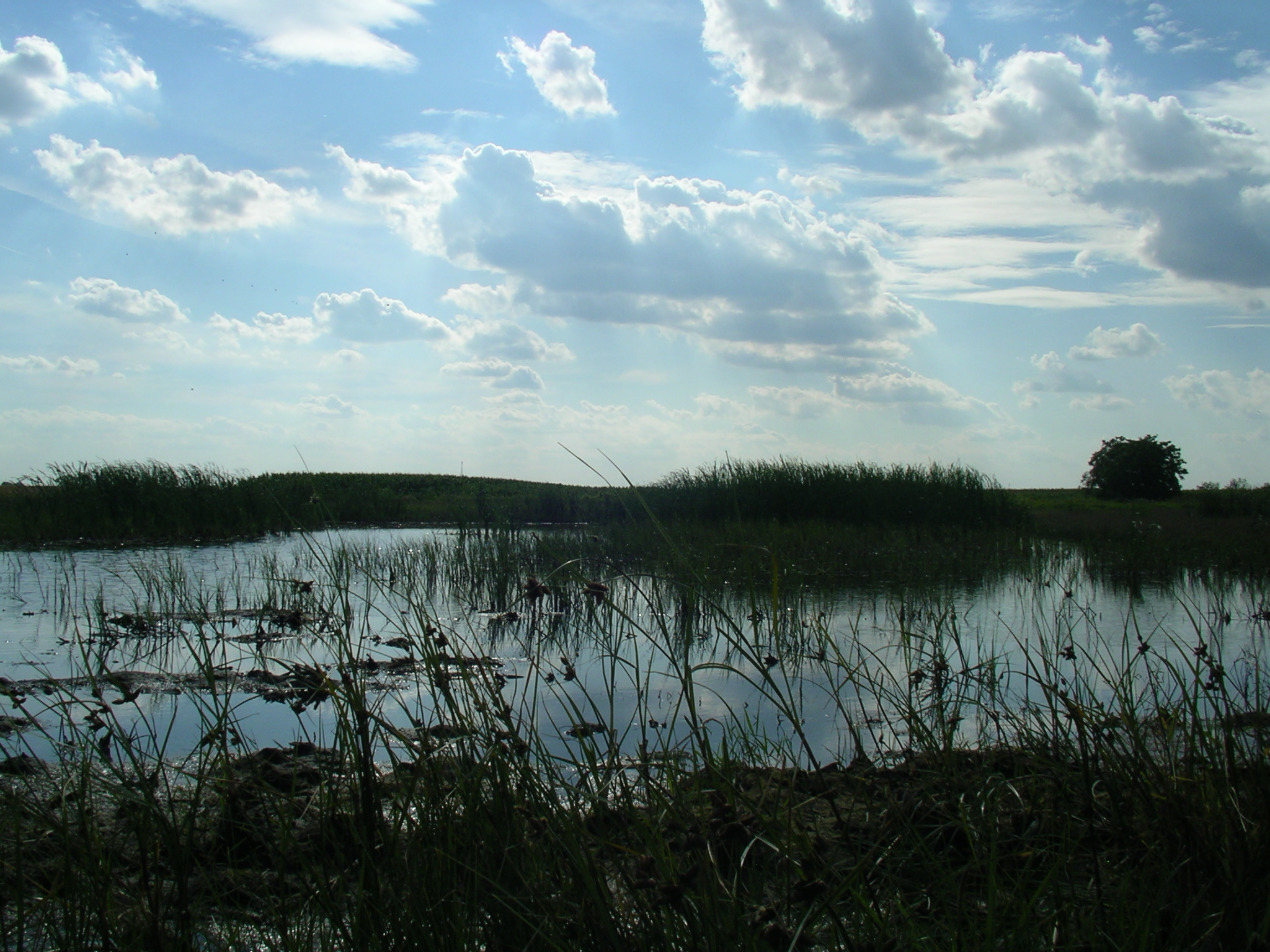
Landscape near Nagyszénás

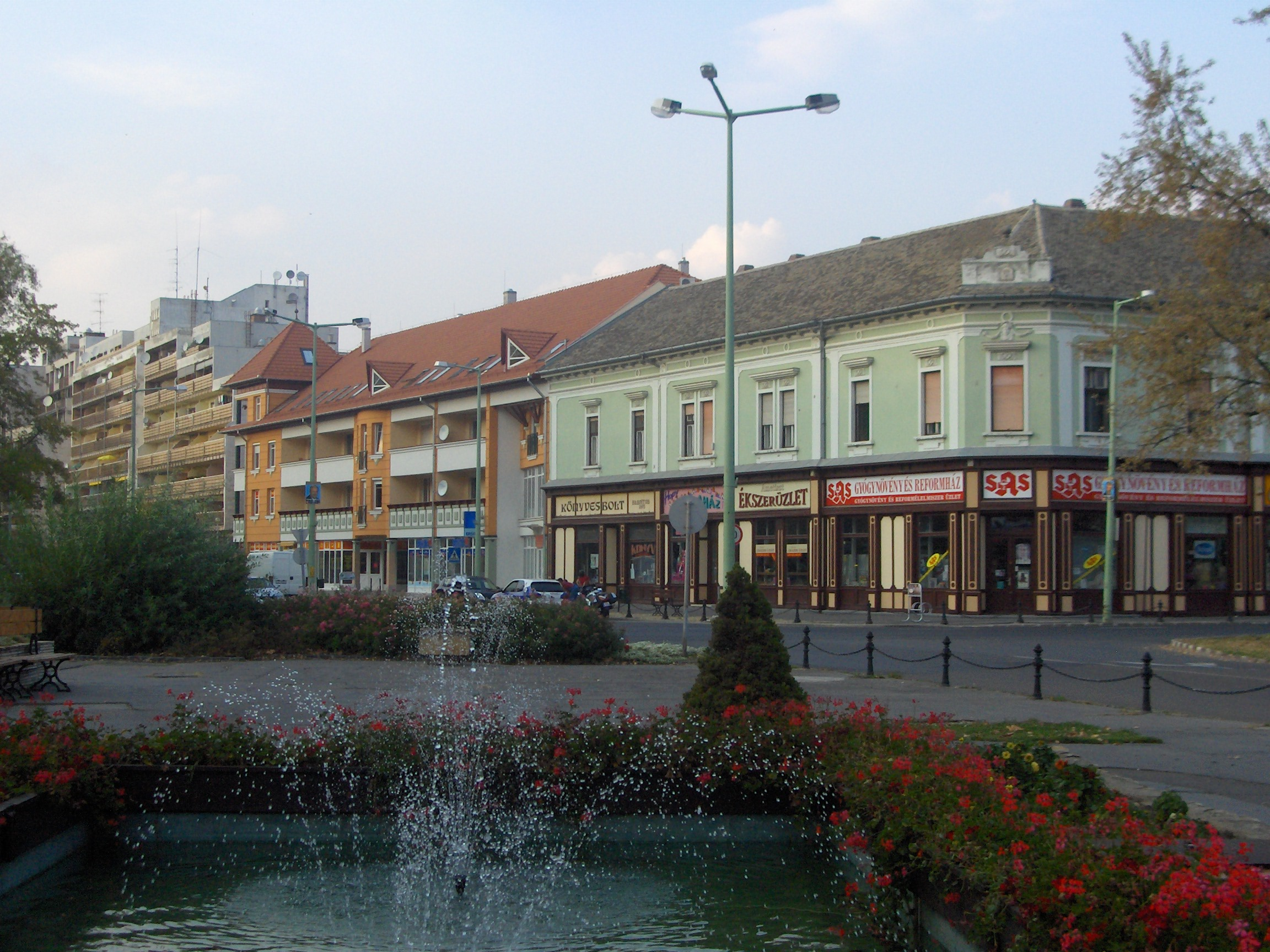
Downtown Orosháza

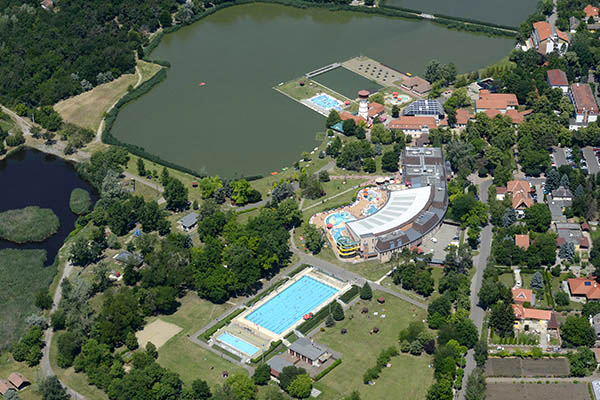
Spa in Gyopárosfürdő (Orosháza)

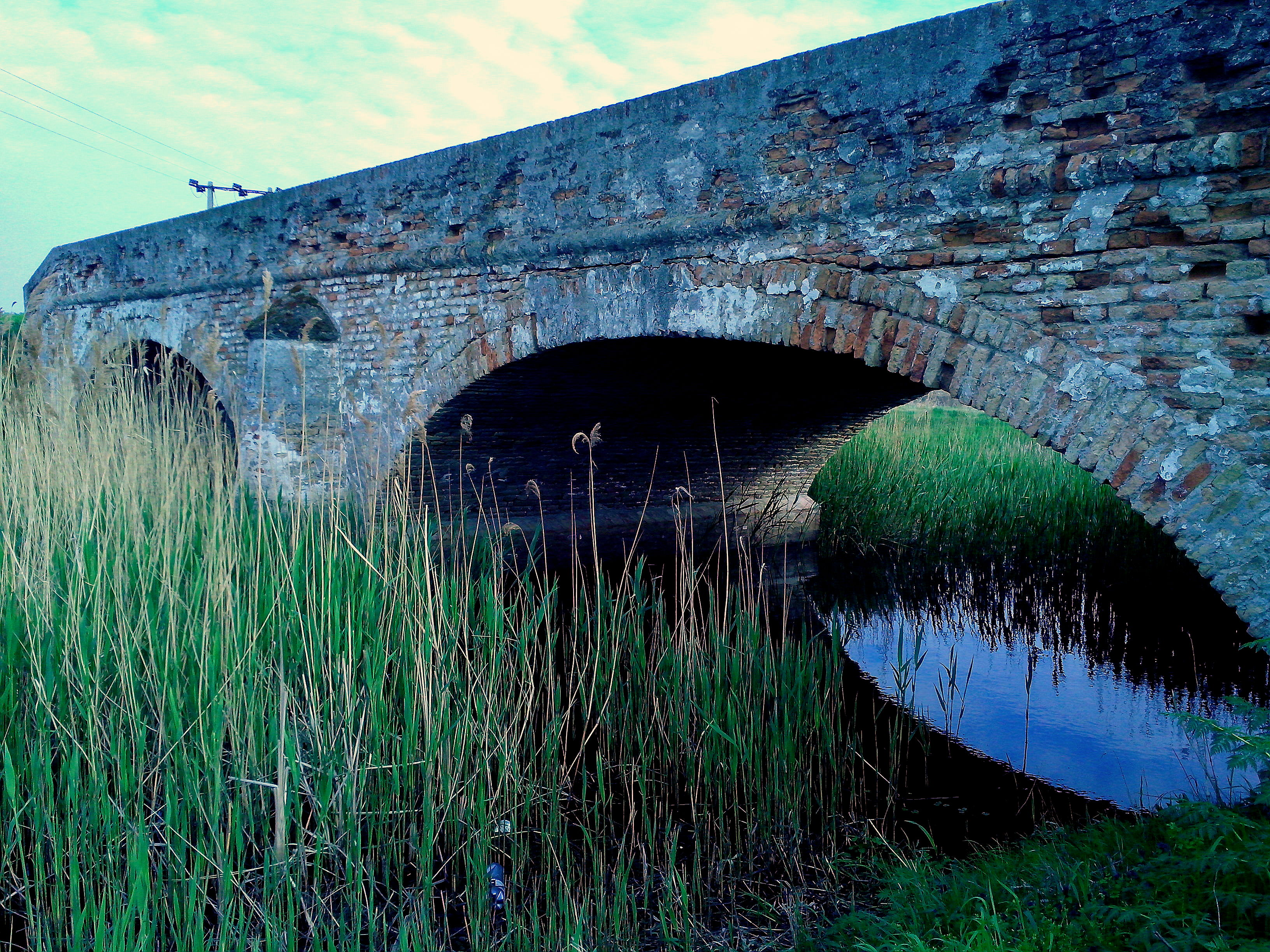
Turkish bridge near Békéssámson

== See also ==
- List of cities and towns of Hungary
