= Sándor Szokolay =

Hungarian composer and professor

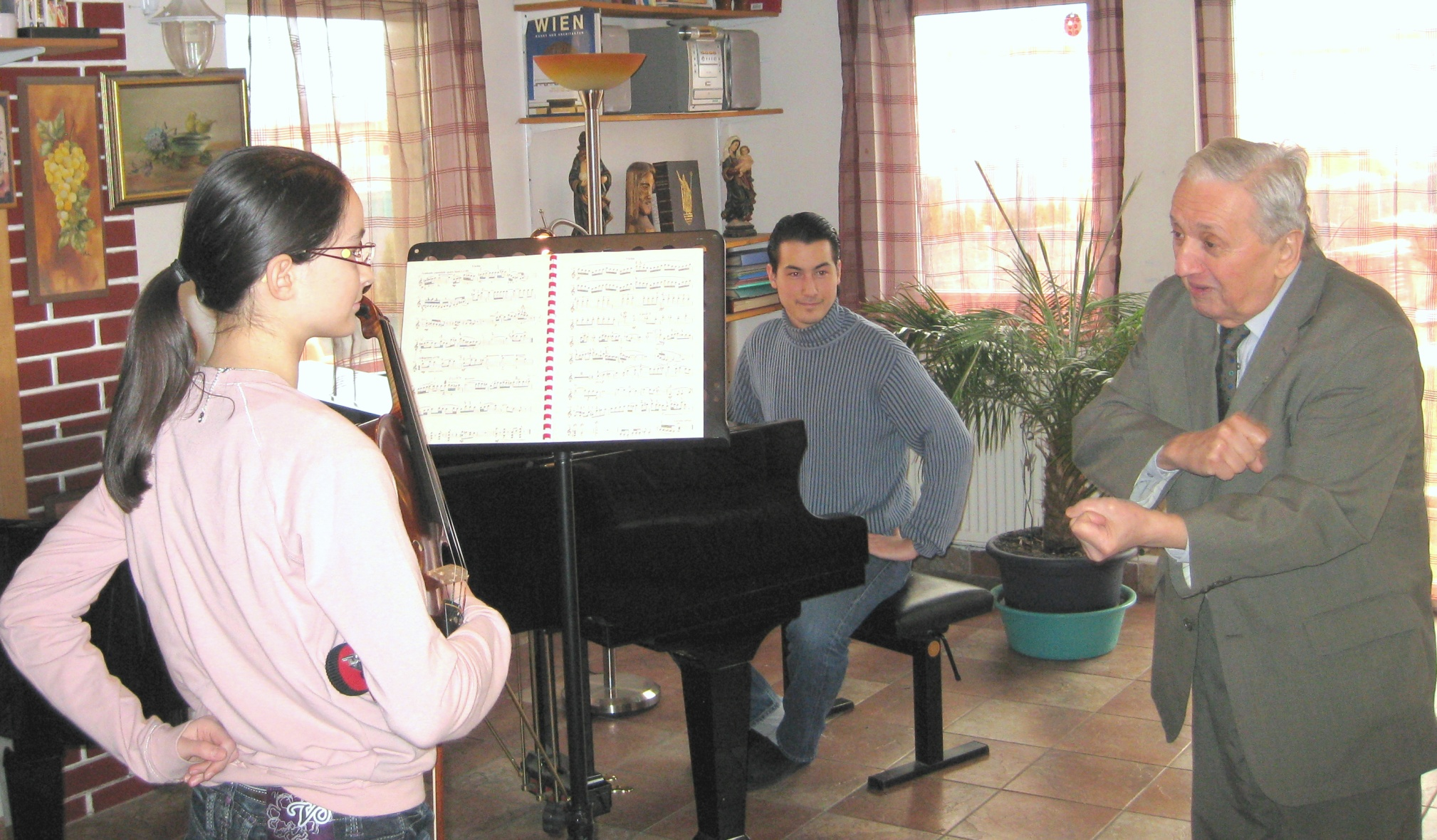
Szokolay teaching the Huszti-Duo Vienna in Parndorf

Sándor Szokolay (30 March 1931 – 8 December 2013) was a Hungarian composer and professor of the Liszt Ferenc Academy, Budapest.

== Life ==
Szokolay was born in Kunágota in a Lutheran evangelic family and began his music studies in Békéstarhos. Then he attended the Franz Liszt Academy of Music, Budapest. His teachers were Ferenc Szabó and Ferenc Farkas. Between 1957 and 1961 he worked at the Hungarian Radio music department. Between 1959 and 1994 he was a professor at the Franz Liszt Academy of Music, Budapest. He retired in 1994 and moved to Sopron where he lived and worked till his death. His main works, operas, oratoria, are well known all over the world.

Szokolay was chairman of the Hungarian Kodály Society (1978) and the Hungarian Music Camera (1991–92), and he was member of the Hungarian Széchenyi Art Academy (1992).

== Prizes ==
- Wieniawsky-competition, winner (Warsaw, 1956)
- Erkel Ferenc-prize (1960, 1965)
- Kossuth-prize (1966)
- Merited Artist (1976)
- Bartók-Pásztory prize (1987)
- Hungarian Art prize (1993)
- Corvin-chain (2001)

== Discography ==
- Samson, opera in two acts, performed by György Melis, Erzsebet Hazy e.a., Chorus and Orchestra of the Budapest Opera, directed by András Kórodi, a production of Hungaroton (SLPX 11738/39), 1975.
- 5 author disc
- Author Disc CD in 1997

== Sources ==
- "Data of the Hungarian Széchenyi Art Academy". Archived from the original on 13 August 2004.
