= Treaty of Bucharest (1916) =

World War I military treaty

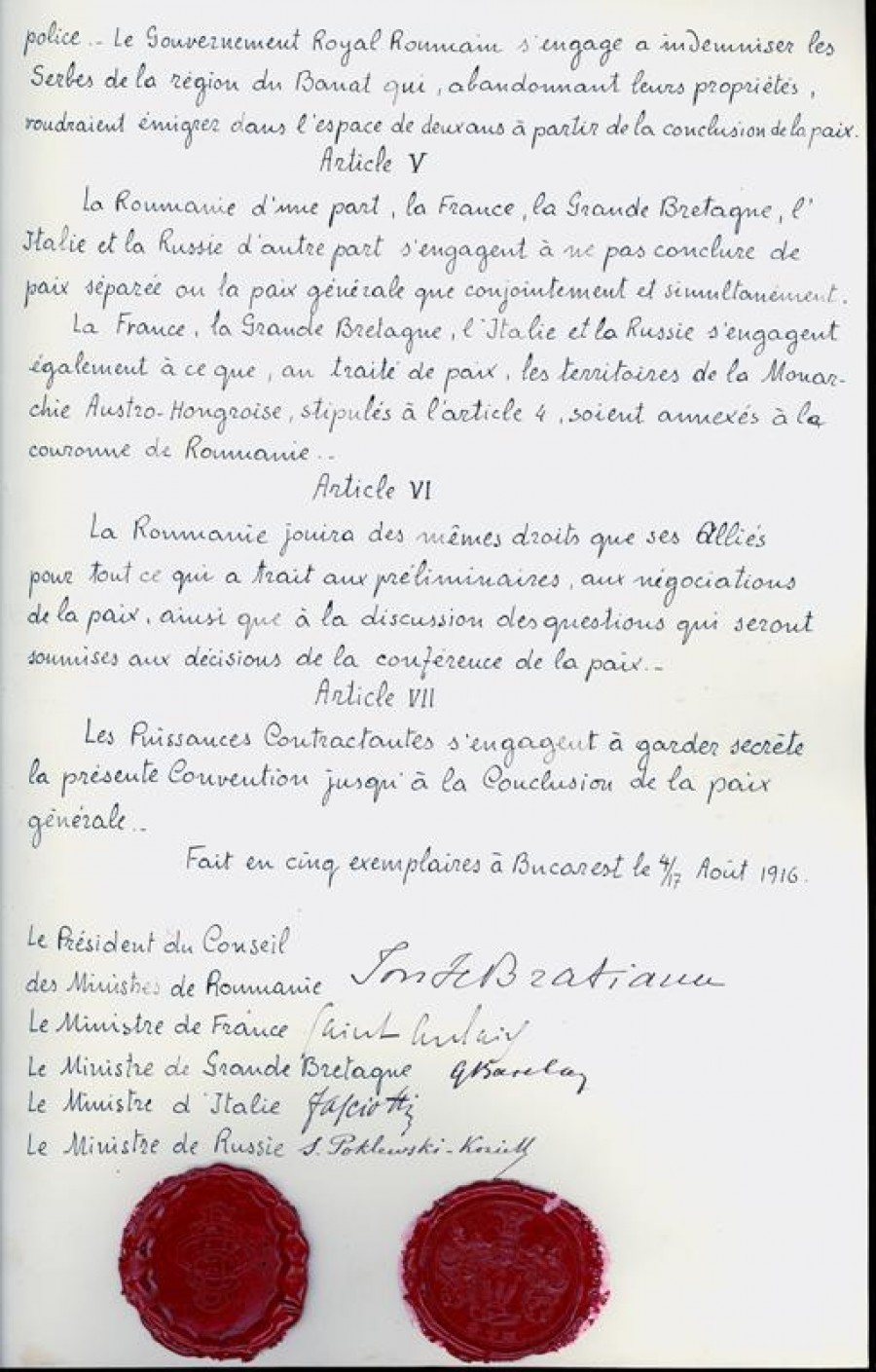
- Treaty of Bucharest (1916)
- Signed: 4/17 August 1916
- Location: Bucharest
- Condition: Ratification by Romania and the Entente Powers
- Signatories: Kingdom of Romania; Russian Empire; French Republic; United Kingdom; Kingdom of Italy
- Languages: French

The Treaty of Bucharest of 1916 was signed between Romania and the Entente Powers on 4 (Old Style)/17 (New Style) August 1916 in Bucharest. The treaty stipulated the conditions under which Romania agreed to join the war on the side of the Entente, particularly territorial promises in Austria-Hungary. The signatories bound themselves to keep secret the contents of the treaty until a general peace was concluded.

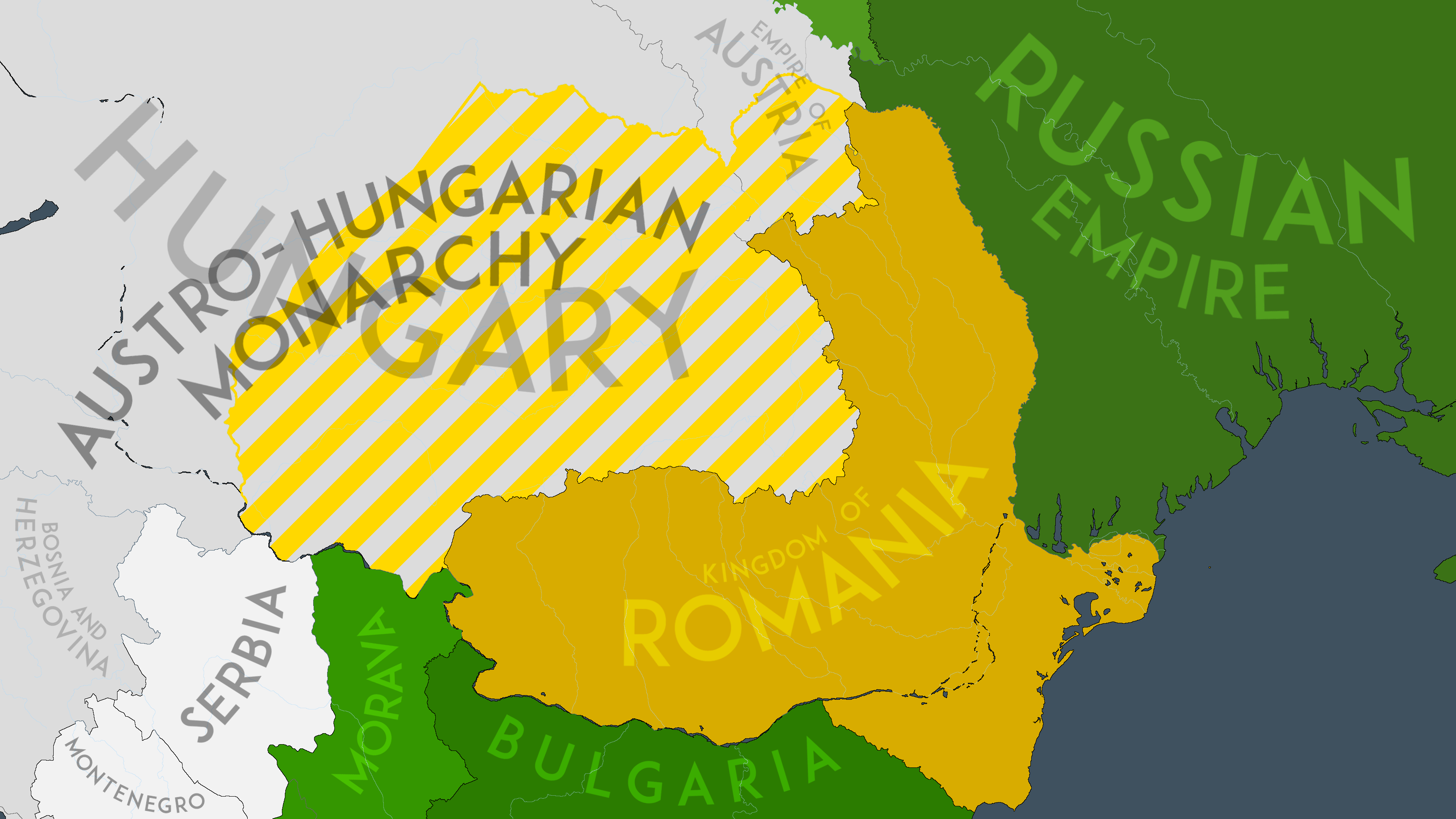
Map of the treaty and the military situation on 17 August 1916.

== Negotiations ==
In 1915 Lieutenant-Colonel Christopher Thomson, a fluent French speaker, was sent to Bucharest as British military attaché on Kitchener's initiative to bring Romania into the war. But when there he quickly formed the view that an unprepared and ill-armed Romania facing a war on three fronts against Austria-Hungary, Turkey and Bulgaria would be a liability not an asset to the allies. This view was brushed aside by Whitehall and he signed a Military Convention with Romania on 13 August 1916. Thompson became head of the British Military Mission.

== Terms ==
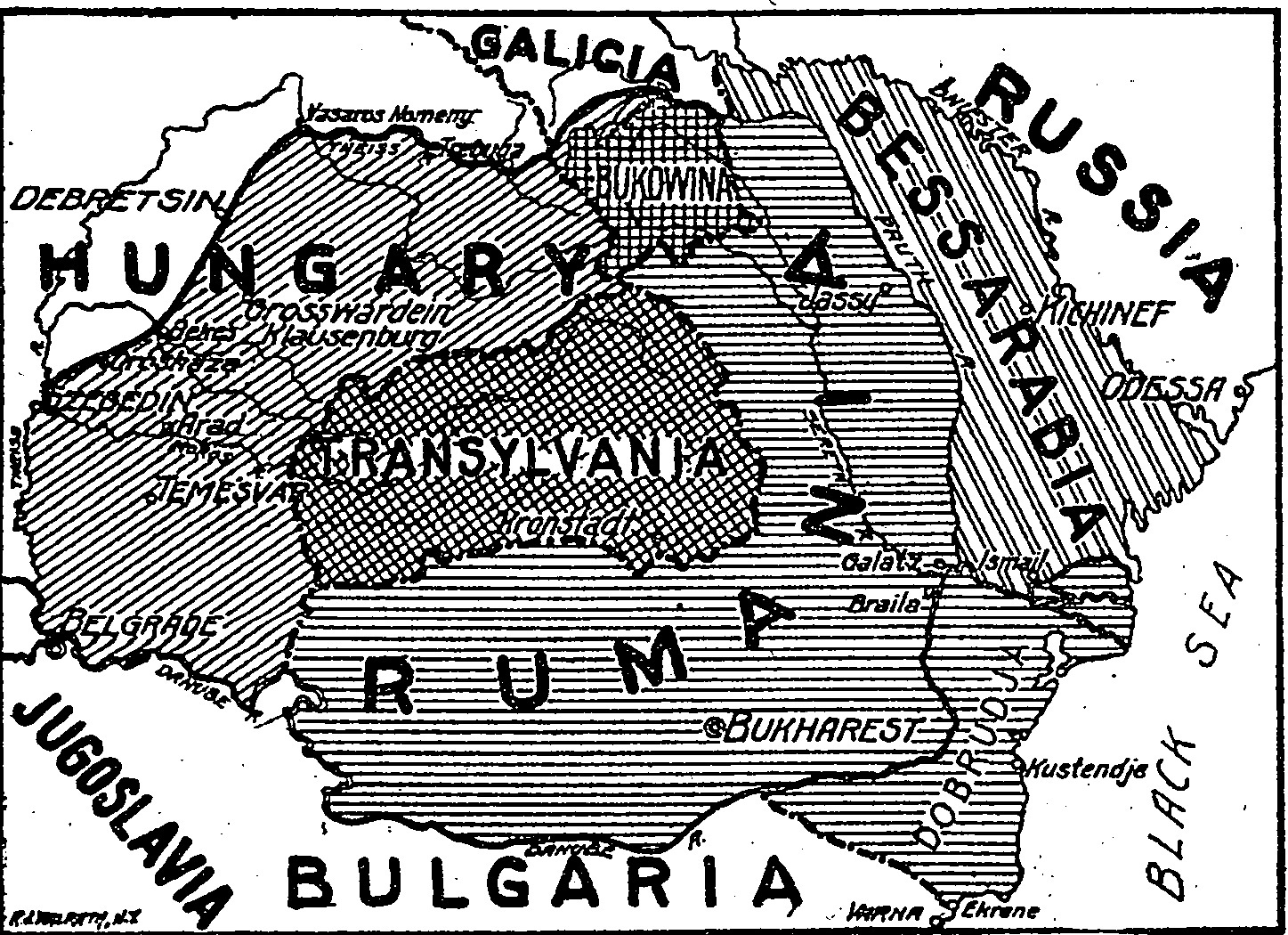
Proposed demarcation line with Hungary. Note that the 1916 treaty did not give Bessarabia and the part of Bukovina at the left bank of the Prut to Romania.

Ethno-linguistic map of Austria-Hungary, 1910 (for comparison)

The treaty had two parts: a political treaty (seven articles) and a military convention (seventeen articles). The Romanian government was to declare war on Austria-Hungary, in accordance with the stipulations in the military convention, on August 28 (new style) the latest, according to the political treaty. In exchange, it was to receive the following territories (122,000 square kilometres including 3 million Romanians and 2.5 million Hungarians and Szekely from Hungary and about 9,000 square kilometres from Austria):

- Transylvania, Crișana and Maramureș, territories ruled by Hungary, but with a slight ethnic Romanian relative majority and Hungarian and German minorities, with its western border partially reaching the Tisza river, in the north to Vásárosnamény and then again near Szeged at Algyö and from here on encompassing the Banat region flowing into the Danube.
- The whole Banat territory ruled by Hungary, with a mixed Romanian (37.42 %), German (24.50 %), Serbian (17.97 %) and Hungarian (15.31 %) population.
- Most of Bukovina (the whole region except the part at the left bank of the Prut river) extending to Dniester, the territory ruled by Austria, with a Romanian more spatial geographical majority than an overall ethnic relative majority (since the whole of Bukovina had 41% Ukrainians and 34% Romanians in 1910), including Czernowitz but also including Ukrainian and Hutsul majority populations on a band of territory in the SW and W along the Czeremosz river and north-west of Czernowitz.

The exact borders stipulated by the treaty were those of prewar Romania (Article I) and those it was allowed to annex from Austria-Hungary, up to a line of demarcation described in Article IV:

The line of delimitation will start on the Pruth at a point of the present frontier between Roumania and Russia near Novoselitza and will ascend this river as far as the frontier of Galicia at the confluence of the Pruth and the Ceremos. From there, it will follow the frontier of Galicia and Bucovina, and that of Galicia and Hungary, up the point Stog (hill 1655). From that point it will follow the line of separation of the Theiss and the Viso until it reaches the Theiss at the village of Trebusa up-stream from the spot where it unites with the Viso. Starting from that point it will go down along the thalweg of the Theiss to a distance of 4 kilometres (2.5 mi) downstream from its confluence with the Szamos, leaving the village of Vásárosnamény to Roumania. It will then continue in an SSW direction to a point 6 kilometres (3.7 mi) east of the town of Debrecen. From that point, it will reach the Crish (Körös) 3 kilometres (1.9 mi) downstream from the union of its two affluents (the White Crish and the Swift Crish). It will then join the Theiss on a line with the village of Algyő, north of Szeged, passing to the west of the villages of Orosháza and Békéssámson; 3 kilometres (1.9 mi) from the latter it will make a slight curve. From Algyő the line will descend the thalweg of the Theiss down to its confluence with the Danube, and will finally follow the thalweg of the Danube down to the present frontier of Roumania.

In Article IV Romania also bound itself not to construct fortifications opposite Belgrade and to indemnify Serbs from Banat for their properties if they emigrated from Romania in the two years following the conclusion of peace.

In Article V of the political convention, the signatories promised not to make separate peace and also bound Great Britain, France, Italy and Russia to let Romania annex the territories from Article IV at an eventual Peace Treaty. The Entente also guaranteed Romania equal rights with its allies at the Peace Conference in Article VI of the political treaty. Article VII bound the signatories to maintaining secrecy of the convention until a general peace was signed.

The military convention stated that Romania was to attack Austria-Hungary from the south while Russia committed itself to start an offensive on the Austrian front to support the Romanian advance into Transylvania. Also, the Russian High Command promised to send two infantry divisions and one cavalry division into Dobruja to protect the rear of the front from a Bulgarian attack. The French and the British pledged to start an offensive on the Thessaloniki front in order to force Bulgaria out of the war.

== Romania in the war ==
In the morning of 27 August 1916 (14 August O.S.), a Crown Council was held at the Cotroceni Palace, convened by King Ferdinand, which decided to honor the treaty with the Entente Powers. On that day, Romania declared war on Austria-Hungary, and launched three armies of 440,000 men the same night across the passes of the Southern and Eastern Carpathians.

The advance of the Romanian Army was initially unopposed, as Austria-Hungary had not stationed considerable forces along the Romanian border. By mid-September, however, the attack was halted, with German, Bulgarian and Turkish troops advancing into Dobruja and threatening to outflank the Romanian Army from the south-east.

By October, the Romanian Army was pushed out of Transylvania with the help of German reinforcements, and by the end of 1916 the capital Bucharest had fallen, along with Wallachia and Dobruja, under the control of the Central Powers, while the Romanian government retreated to Iași. Thompson, now head of the British Military Mission, had to alleviate the consequences of Romania's capitulation, and he personally supervised the destruction of the Romanian oil wells to deny them to Germany.

In 1917, the Romanian Army recovered and succeeded in stopping German attempts to break the front, in spite of the disintegration of the Russian Army after the February Revolution. The exit of Russia from the war in March 1918 with the Treaty of Brest-Litovsk left Romania alone in Eastern Europe, and a peace treaty between Romania and the Central Powers (Treaty of Bucharest (1918)) was negotiated in May 1918, but was not ratified by Romania, allowing them to re-declare war on the Central Powers on November 10, 1918, and thus participate as a victorious power in subsequent peace negotiations. The toll of the campaign was approximately 220,000 dead for Romania, but in the end it gained Transylvania, two-thirds of the Banat and Partium (in total 102,800 square kilometres), almost all of Bukovina (10,500 square kilometres) except for 5 villages in the NW corner that became part of Poland due to a connecting railway until 1928, in the Treaty of Trianon and the Treaty of Sévrès. The whole of Bessarabia became part of Romania in March 1918.

== Gallery ==
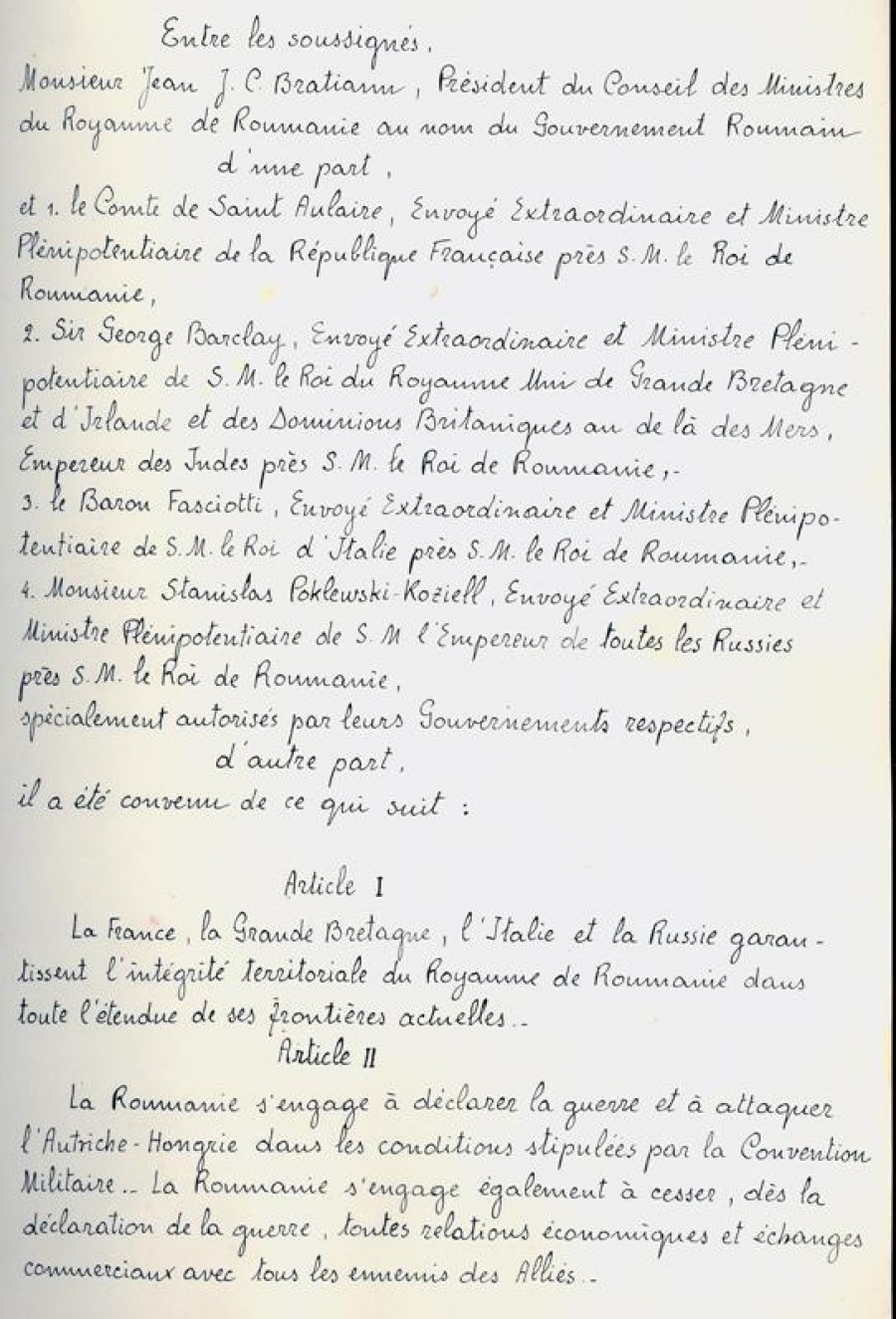
Political treaty
(1st page)

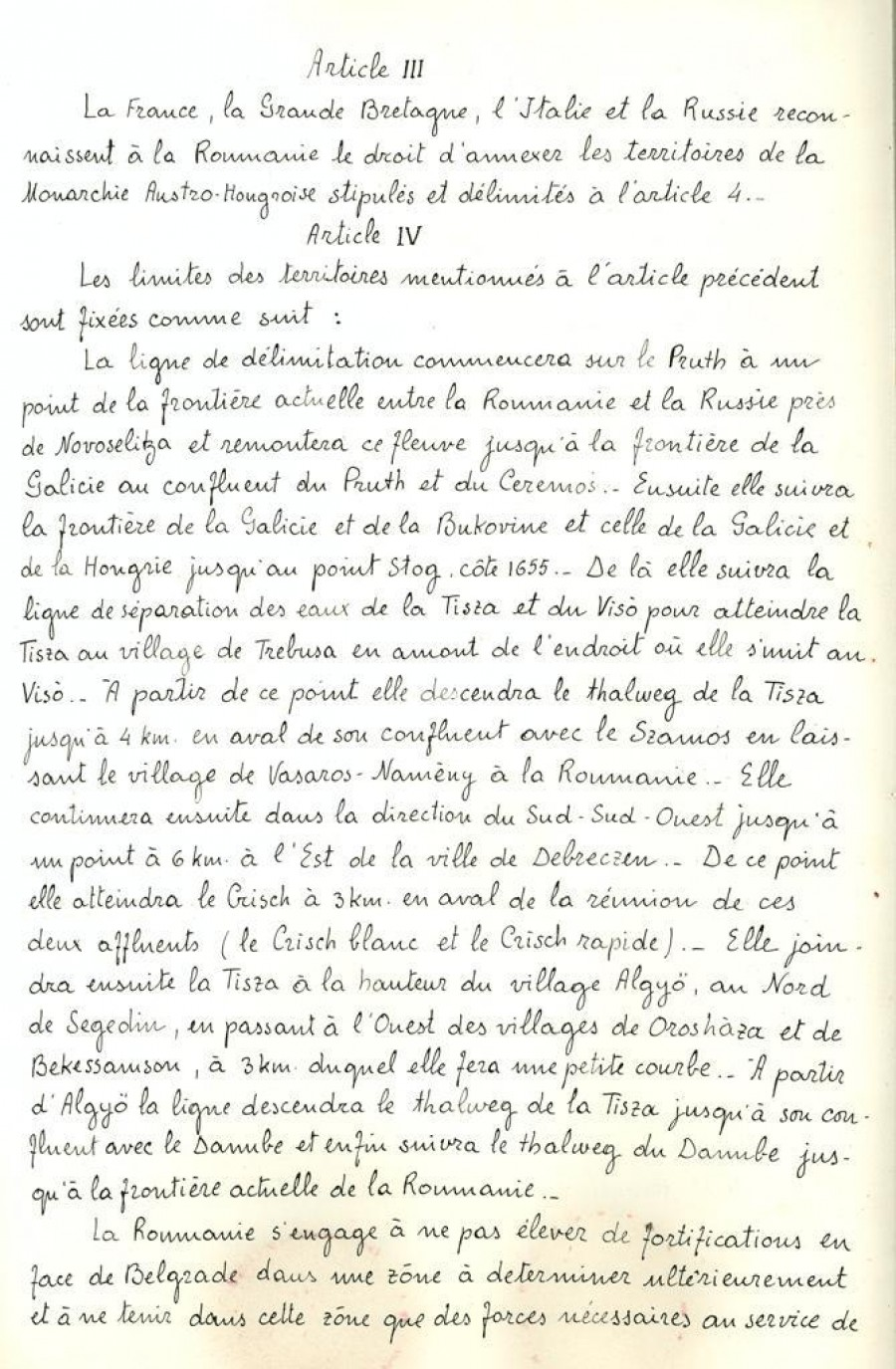
Political treaty
(2nd page)

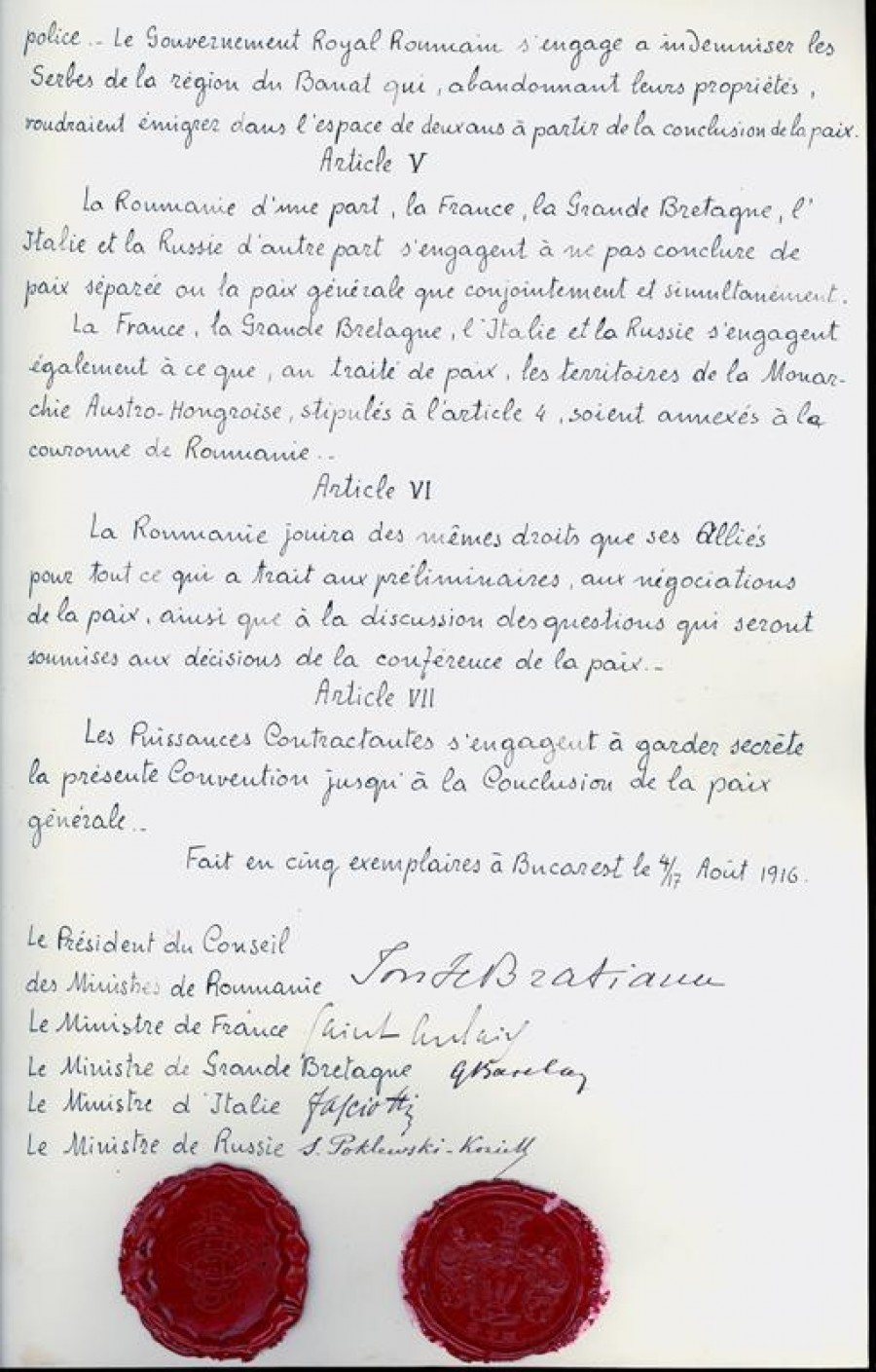
Political treaty
(3rd page)

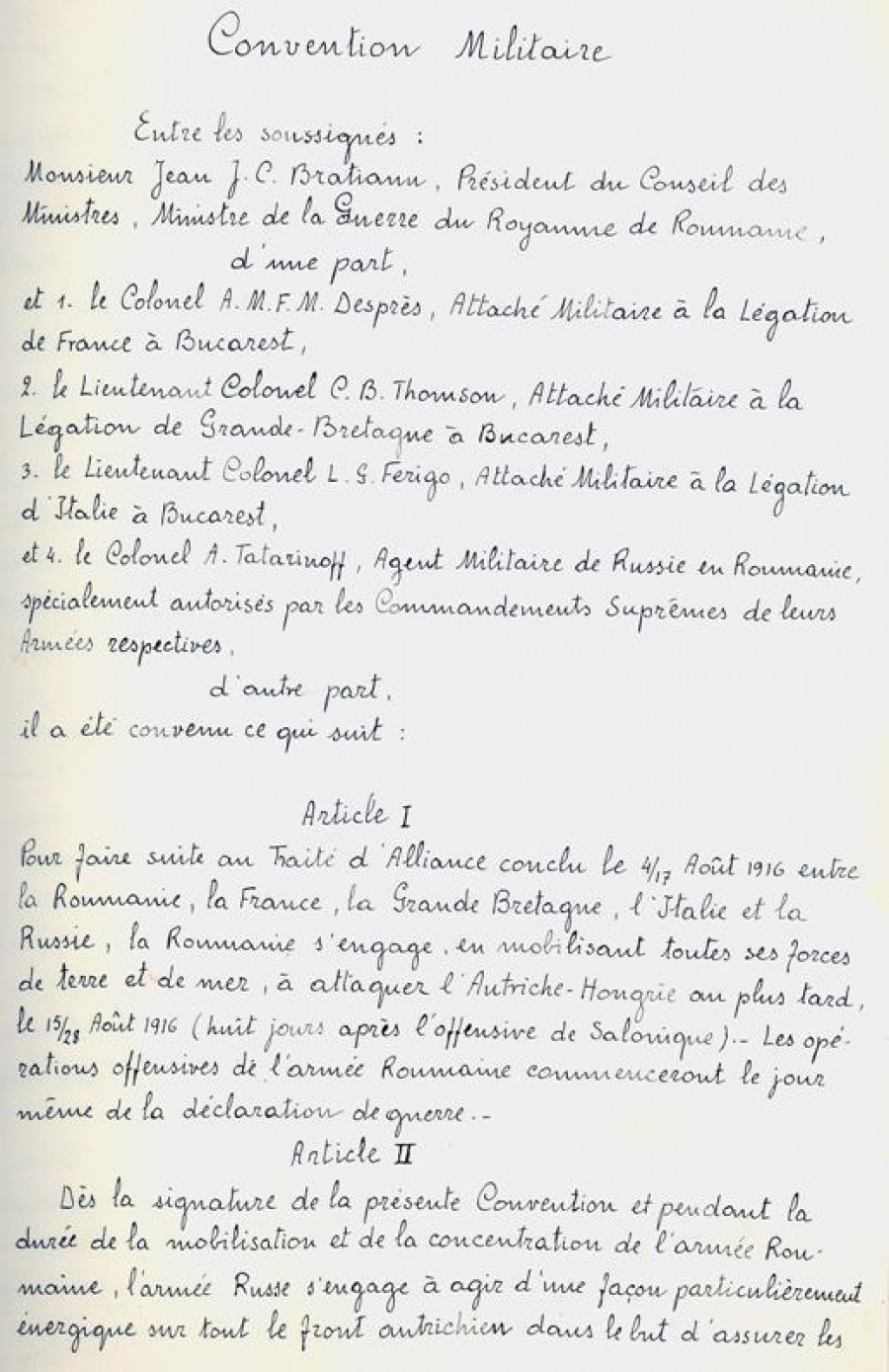
Military convention
(1st page)

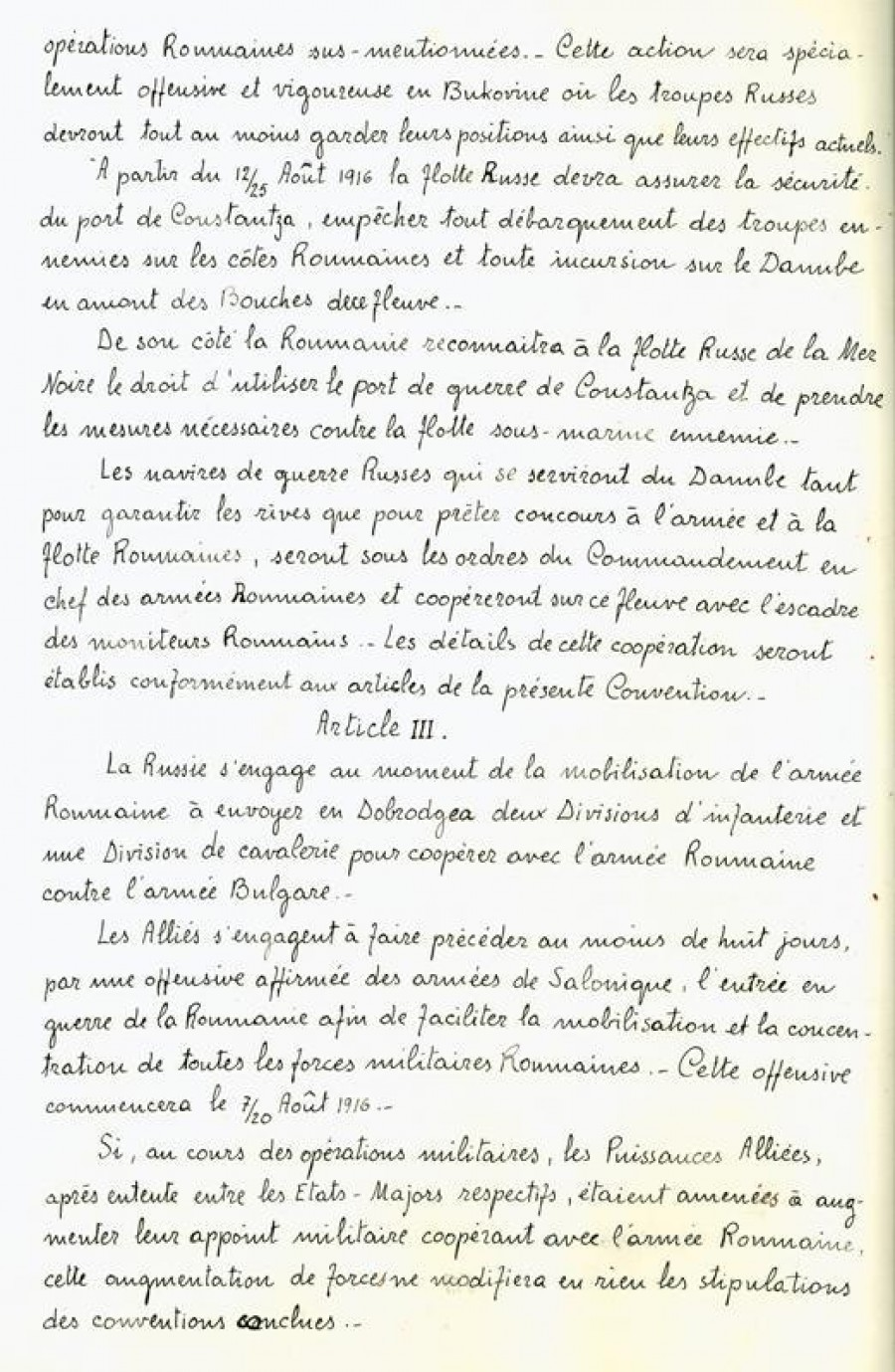
Military convention
(2nd page)

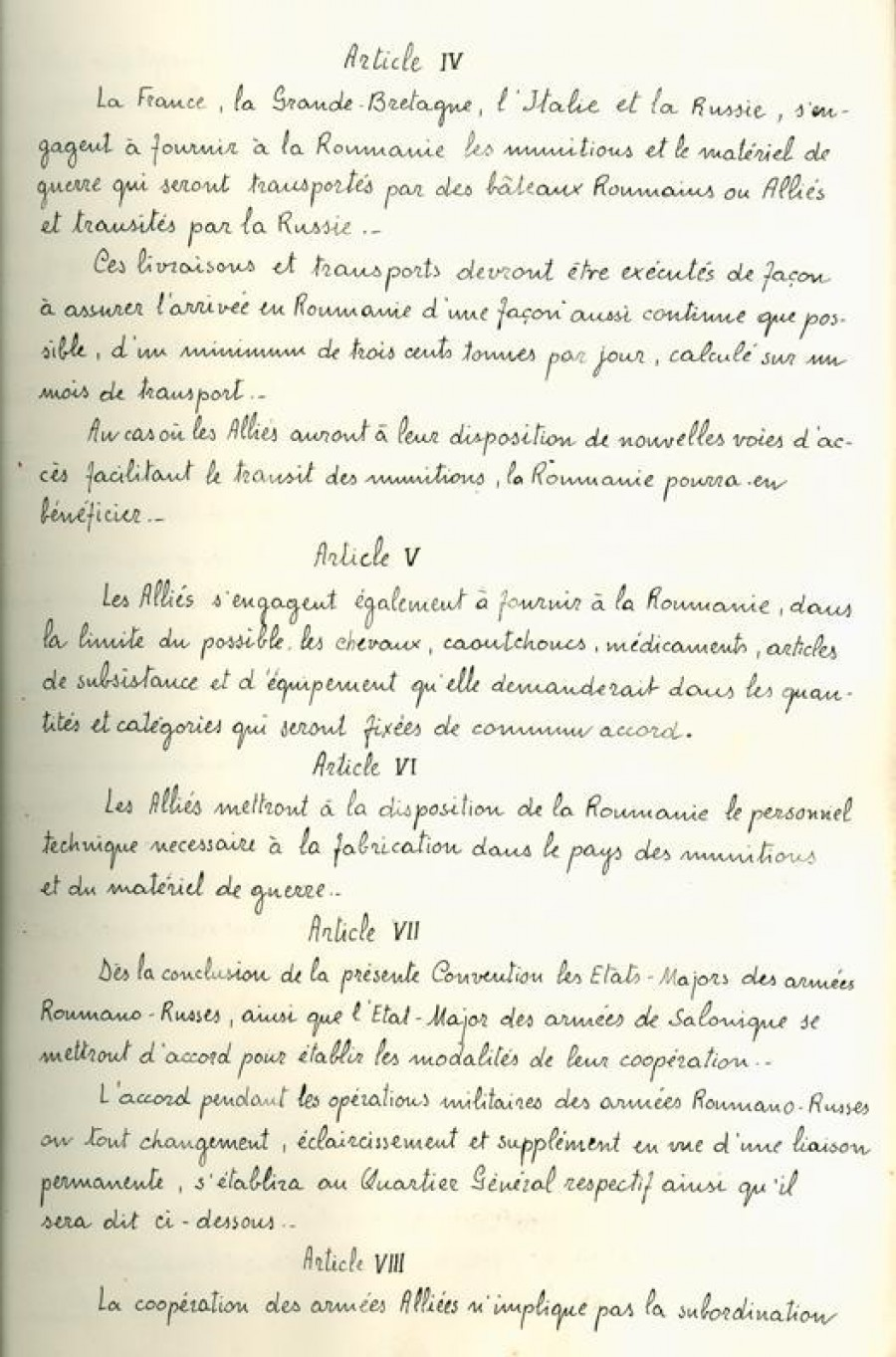
Military convention
(3rd page)
