= Sándor Mátrai =

Hungarian footballer

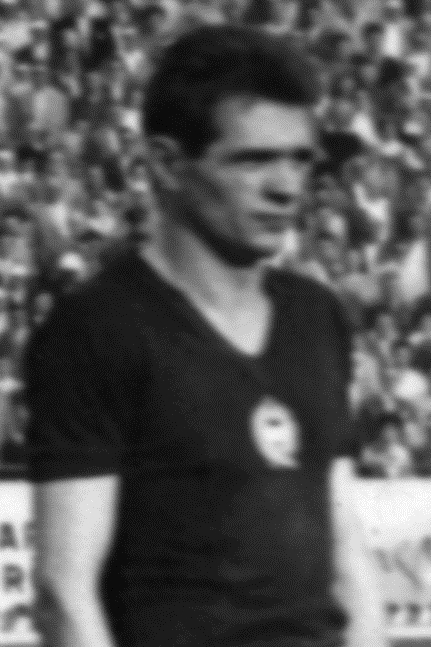

Personal information
- Full name: Sándor Magna Mátrai
- Date of birth: 20 November 1932
- Place of birth: Nagyszénás, Hungary
- Date of death: 29 May 2002 (aged 69)
- Place of death: Budapest, Hungary
- Position: Defender

International career
Years	Team	Apps	(Gls)
1956 – 1967	Hungary	81	(0)

Sándor Mátrai (Born Sándor Magna, 20 November 1932 – 29 May 2002) was a Hungarian footballer.

During his club career, he played for Ferencváros. He earned 81 caps for the Hungary national football team from 1956 to 1967 and participated in the 1958 FIFA World Cup, the 1962 FIFA World Cup, the 1964 European Nations' Cup, and the 1966 FIFA World Cup.

He was born in Nagyszénás and died in Budapest.
