= Maria Berényi =

Romanian Hungarian historian and poet

- Born: 15 April 1959; Méhkerék, Hungary
- Occupations: Historian, poet
- Awards: Order of Cultural Merit in the "Commander" rank (2011)

Academic background
- Education: Eötvös Loránd University; Babeș-Bolyai University
- Website: mariaberenyi.hu

Maria Berényi (born 15 April 1959; Hungarian: Mária Berényi) is a Hungarian historian and poet of Romanian ethnicity. Born in Méhkerék (Romanian: Micherechi), she has been the director of the Research Institute of the Romanians of Hungary in Gyula (Jula, Giula) since 1993.

Berényi has published several volumes on the Romanian community in 19th-century Transylvania and Hungary. She has also published several volumes of verses in both Romanian and Hungarian. For her research and works, she has received multiple awards and distinctions.

== Biography ==
Maria Berényi was born on 15 April 1959 in Méhkerék (Romanian: Micherechi), Hungary. She is a member of the Romanian minority in Hungary. She studied in the Faculty of Humanities of the Eötvös Loránd University in Budapest, from which she graduated in 1983.

Berényi obtained a doctorate in philology from the same university in 1986 and a doctorate in history from the Babeș-Bolyai University in Cluj-Napoca, Romania, in 2001. Between 1983 and 1993, she collaborated in the Press Service of the Minorities of Hungary. As of 2023, she was the director of the Research Institute of the Romanians of Hungary, which she has been leading since 1993. Seated in Gyula (Jula, Giula), the institute was founded on 29 May 1993 to study the culture, history and traditional life of the Romanians in Hungary.

As of 2014, Berényi had published seven volumes of studies on the Romanians of Transylvania and Hungary and over 100 studies published in multiple countries, and had participated in several scientific events organized in Romania, Austria, Serbia and Ukraine. Her research topics include, among others, the history of the Romanian Orthodox Church and the Romanian Greek Catholic Church in Hungary in the 18th and 19th centuries, the role of the church and of private foundations in 19th-century Transylvania and Hungary, the formation of Romanian intellectual elites in the University of Budapest in the 19th century and the role of women in Romanian culture and society in Transylvania and Hungary in the 19th century.

One of her works is the volume Poveștile caselor. Români în Buda și Pesta ("The Tales of the Houses. Romanians in Buda and Pest"), published by the Romanian Academy in 2011. According to Romanian journalist Bogdan Stanciu, the volume was the first book by a member of Hungary's Romanian minority to be published by the Romanian Academy in over a century. Berényi has been an important collaborator for Foaia Românească, a newspaper of the Romanian minority of Hungary.

As a poet, Berényi has published volumes of verses in both Romanian and Hungarian. Romanian literary critic and historian Ecaterina Țarălungă defined Berényi as "the most prolific bilingual poet of the Romanian community of Hungary". Her debut volume was Autodefinire ("Self-definition", 1987), followed by Fără titlu/Cím nélkül ("Untitled", 1989, a bilingual volume), Pulsul veacului palid ("The Pulse of the Pale Century", 1997) and În pragul noului mileniu ("On the Verge of the New Millennium", 2002). University of Szeged lecturer Iudit Călinescu described Berényi's use of bilinguism as a formula to more adequately meet the needs of lyrical expression and find answers to existential questions. Eötvös Loránd University professor Tiberiu Herdean characterized Berényi's poetry as sincere, confessional and with rich themes and a high emotional and intellectual charge. Țarălungă highlighted as the main themes in Berényi's poetry the years of childhood, the "grass of childhood", the "tears of the 20th century" and the century's children without childhood and "street children".

On 1 December 2011, Berényi was awarded the Order of Cultural Merit in the rank of "Commander" by the President of Romania, Traian Băsescu, for her actions for Romanian culture and identity as a member of the Romanian diaspora. She has also received the Eminescu Award from the publishing house Editura Eminescu and the Oradea-based magazine Familia, the "For Méhkerék" medal and diploma, an honorary diploma from the Romanian Cultural Institute's branch in Budapest and the "Golden Platelet" distinction from the Vasile Goldiș Western University of Arad. She was an honorary guest at the Transylvania International Book Festival held in Cluj-Napoca from 3 to 8 October 2017, in which she received the award "Honorary Citizen of Romanian Culture" for her studies and volumes on Romanian history.
