= Méhkerék =

Coordinates: 46°47′N 21°27′E

Méhkerék Micherechi
- Village
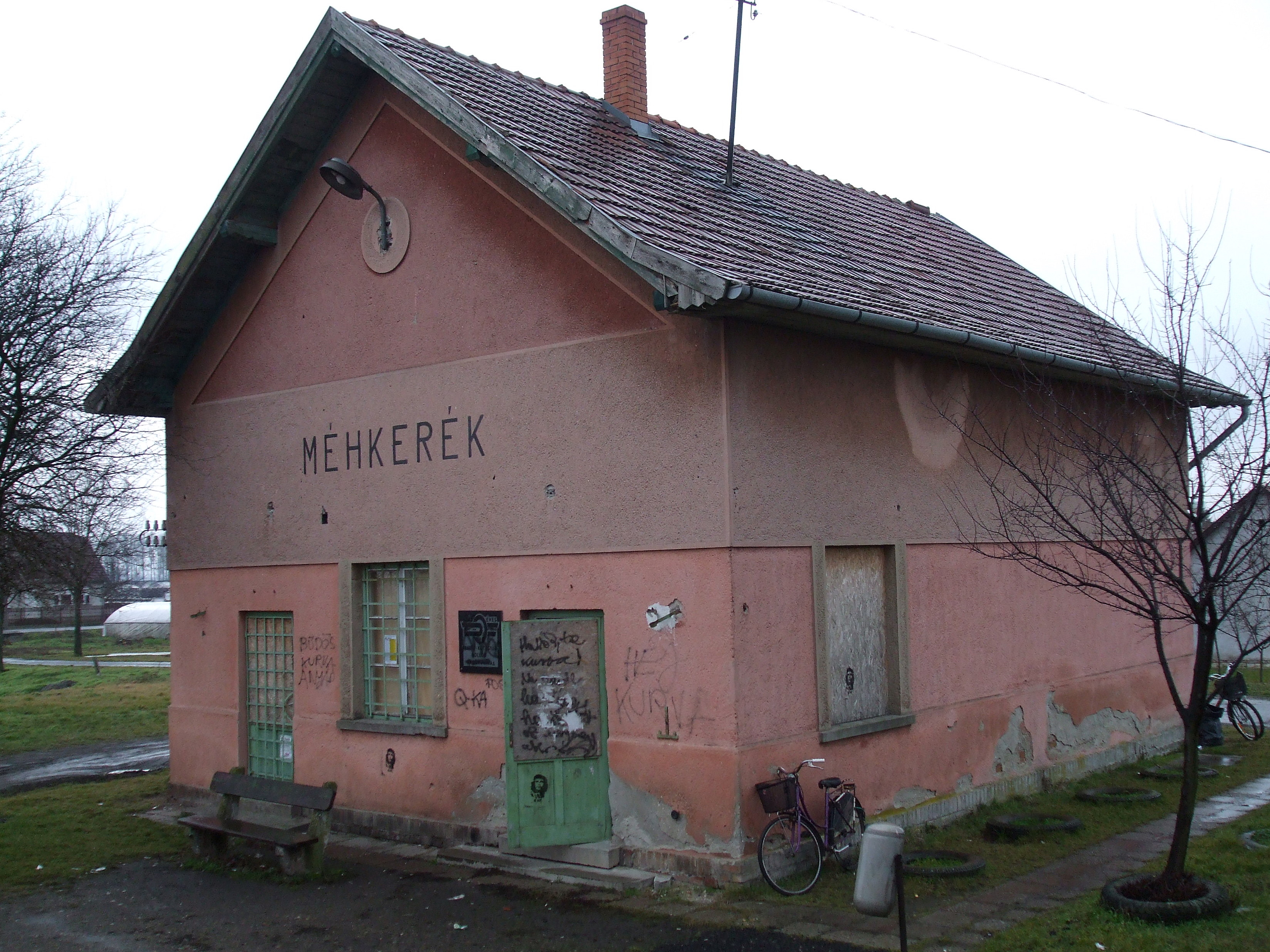

- Coat of arms
- Interactive map of Méhkerék
- Country: Hungary
- County: Békés

Area
  - Total: 25.86 km^{2} (9.98 sq mi)

Population (2015)
  - Total: 2,085
  - Density: 80.7/km^{2} (209/sq mi)
- Time zone: UTC+1 (CET)
  - Summer (DST): UTC+2 (CEST)
- Postal code: 5726
- Area code: 66

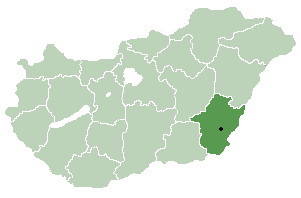
Location of Békés County in Hungary

Méhkerék (Romanian: Micherechi) is a village in Békés County, in the Southern Great Plain region of south-east Hungary.

== History ==
The village was first mentioned in written sources in 1359. The origin of the village's name may be drawn from the original occupation of its inhabitants (méh means "bee" in Hungarian). The population fled the area after the Ottoman conquest. Romanians settled in the area during the 18th century, with the first Romanian Orthodox church being built in 1770. The first primary school was opened in 1815.

== Geography ==
Méhkerék covers an area of 25.86 km^{2} (9.98 sq mi) and has a population of 2,085 people (2015). Most of the residents are ethnic Romanians, most of whom speak Romanian as their mother tongue.

== Sport ==
The association football club, Méhkeréki SE, is based in the town.

== Notable people ==
- Maria Berényi (born 1959), historian and poet of the Romanian minority in Hungary
- Mária Gurzó (born 1968), politician
