= Norbert Erdős =

Hungarian politician

Norbert Erdős MEP

Member of the European Parliament
- In office 1 July 2014 – 1 July 2019
- Constituency: Hungary

Member of the National Assembly
- In office 2 May 2022 – 8 May 2026
- In office 15 May 2002 – 5 May 2014

Personal details
- Born: 25 October 1972 (age 53) Orosháza, Hungary
- Party: Hungarian; Fidesz; EU; European People's Party
- Spouse: Orsolya Erdősné Majoros

Norbert Erdős (born 25 October 1972) is a Hungarian politician and Member of the European Parliament (MEP) from Hungary. He is a member of Fidesz, part of the European People's Party. He has been a Member of the National Assembly of Hungary from 2002 to 2014, and since 2022.

He was a member of the Committee on Youth, Social, Family, and Housing Affairs from 8 June 2010 to 14 February 2011. He joined Fidesz in 1993. He was one of the founders of its youth organization Fidelitas in 1996. Erdős was elected one of the recorders of the National Assembly of Hungary on 14 May 2010. He was appointed director of the Government Office of Békés County on 1 January 2011. He became Member of the European Parliament (MEP) during the 2014 European Parliament election. He was appointed Secretary of State for Food Chain Supervision within the Ministry of Agriculture on 1 November 2020. He held this office until 24 May 2022.

Erdős was elected MP for Orosháza (Békés County 4th constituency) during the 2022 Hungarian parliamentary election. He was appointed a member of the Legislative Committee and deputy chairman of the Sustainable Development Committee. He was also a member of the Committee of Agriculture from 2025 to 2026. He was defeated by Tisza candidate Mária Gurzó during the 2026 Hungarian parliamentary election.

== Personal life ==
He is married to Orsolya Erdősné Majoros.
