= Mária Gurzó =

Hungarian politician

Mária Gurzó Maria Gurzău

Member of the National Assembly
- Assuming office 9 May 2026
- Succeeding: Norbert Erdős
- Constituency: Békés 4th

Personal details
- Born: Mária Magdolna Gurzó Ianosné; 1968 (age 57–58) Méhkerék (Micherechi), Hungary
- Party: Tisza
- Education: Carol Davila University of Medicine and Pharmacy

Mária Magdolna Gurzó Ianosné (born 1968; Romanian: Maria Gurzău) is a Hungarian politician who was elected member of the National Assembly in 2026 representing the Békés County 4th constituency. She previously worked as a dentist.

Gurzó was born in an ethnic Romanian family in Méhkerék (Romanian: Micherechi), Hungary. She studied at the Nicolae Bălcescu Romanian Gymnasium, Primary School and College in Gyula (Jula or Giula) and then graduated with a stomatologist diploma in 1994 from the Faculty of Stomatology of the Carol Davila University of Medicine and Pharmacy in Bucharest, Romania. Between 2024 and 2026, she was a representative of the National Self-Government of Romanians in Hungary. She took her oath of office as member of the National Assembly in the Romanian language. She speaks Hungarian and Romanian.

On 8 June 2026, National Assembly member and Our Homeland Movement (Mi Hazánk) party vice president Előd Novák attacked Gurzó based on her Romanian ethnicity. Novák cited Gurzó's campaign slogan from two years earlier and stated that, for her, "the interests of the Romanians in Hungary are above all else", subsequently asking her if she possessed Romanian citizenship. In response, Gurzó said she had only one citizenship, expressed pride in her Romanian identity and compared the situation of the Romanians in Hungary to that of the Hungarian diaspora. She was applauded in the parliament, including by members of Fidesz and the Christian Democratic People's Party (KDNP), with Prime Minister of Hungary Péter Magyar later joining the debate questioning the usefulness of the topics raised by Mi Hazánk as he stated.
