= Kiss György Observatory =

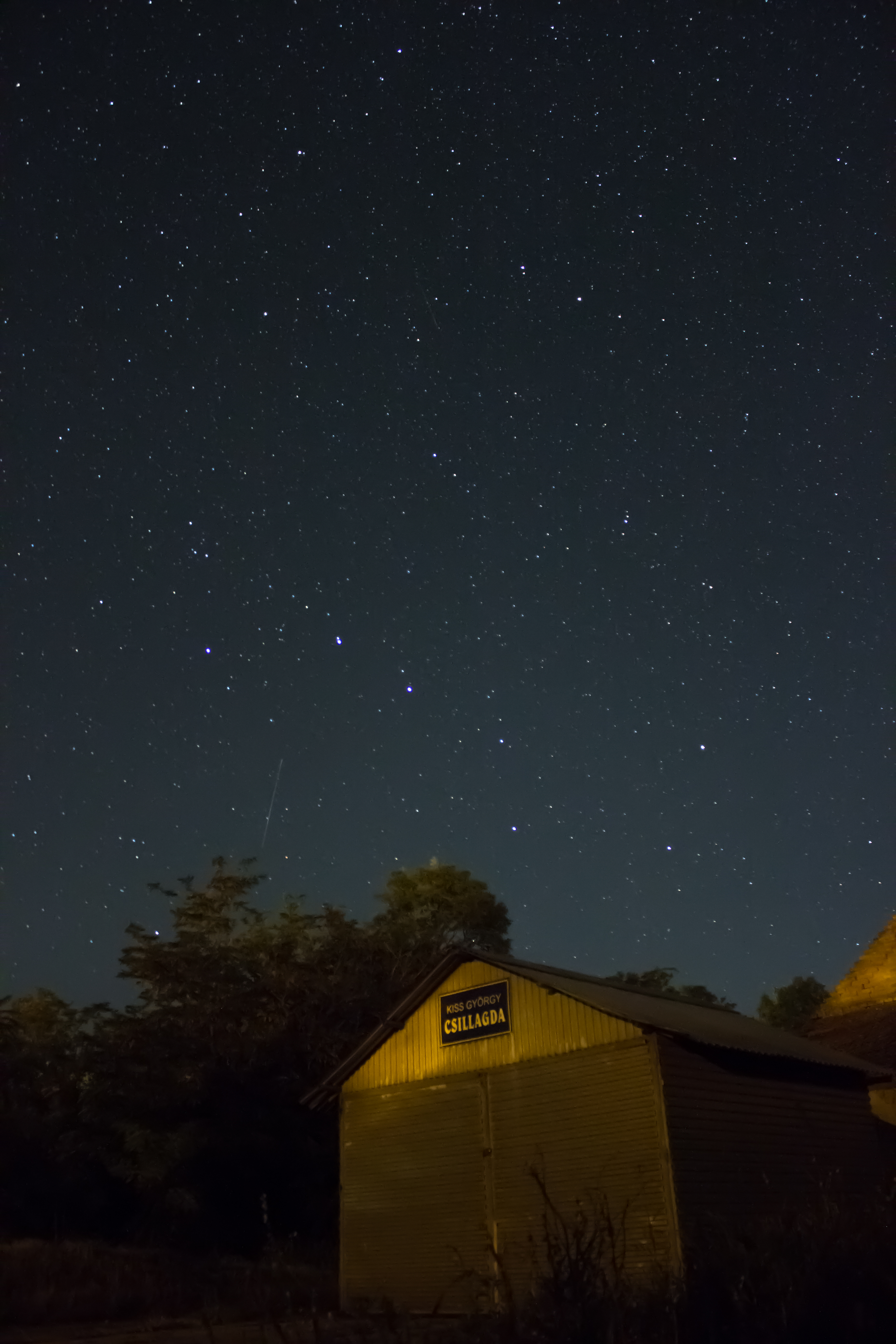
- The observatory with the Ursa Major
- Organization: Mira Astronomical Club
- Location: HU 5931 Nagyszénás, Gádorosi út 24. Hungary
- Coordinates: 46.672667°N 20.668718°E
- Observing time: Every friday, 6pm
- Established: c. 1983
- Website: kgycsillagda.wordpress.com

Telescopes
- 300 mm: Newton
- 200 mm: Newton
- 120 mm: Newton
- 100 mm: Newton
- 80 mm: Newton
- 50 mm: Refracting
- Location within Hungary
- Related media on Commons

The Kiss György Observatory is an observatory in Nagyszénás, Hungary.

== History ==
It was grounded ca. 1980 by György Kiss, who was an amateur astronomer. When he died in 2000 István Zahorecz became the new director. Nowadays it has six telescopes: five reflecting and a refracting.

== Directors ==
- György Kiss (~1980–2000)
- István Zahorecz (2000–2015)
- Andrásné Fődi (2015–2016)
- Tamás Sárkány (2016–2018)
- Andrásné Fődi (2018–)

== See also ==
- List of astronomical observatories
