= Mezőkovácsháza =

Mezőkovácsháza (Covaciu de Câmpie)
- Town
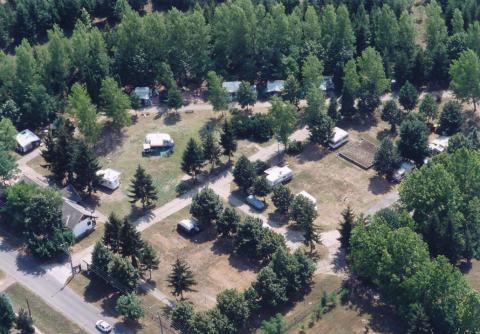
- Aerial view

- Flag Coat of arms

- Location within Hungary
- Coordinates: 46°24′N 20°55′E
- Country: Hungary
- County: Békés
- District: Mezőkovácsháza

Area
  - Total: 62.59 km^{2} (24.17 sq mi)

Population (2015)
  - Total: 6,141
  - Density: 98.11/km^{2} (254.1/sq mi)
- Time zone: UTC+0 (CET)
  - Summer (DST): UTC+1 (CEST)
- Postal code: 5800
- Area code: (+36) 68
- Website: varos.mezokovacshaza.hu

Mezőkovácsháza (Romanian: Covaciu de Câmpie) is a town in Békés County, in the Southern Great Plain region of south-east Hungary.

== Geography ==
It covers an area of 62.59 square kilometres (24.17 square miles) and has a population of 6945 people (2002).

== History ==
According to estimates based on press articles Romanians have bought in the last 10-15 years approximately 300 houses in the town and surrounding areas (unofficial figures), which is a significantly lower proportion than in Battonya.

== Notable residents ==
- György Simonka (1974-), politician
- József Balázs (1984-), footballer
- Zoltán Farkas, musician

== Twin towns – sister cities ==
Mezőkovácsháza is twinned with:

- Moneasa, Romania
- Praid, Romania
- Semlac, Romania
- Vinga, Romania
