= Gádoros =

Coordinates: 46°40′N 20°36′E

- Large village
- Coat of arms
- Interactive map of Gádoros
- Country: Hungary
- County: Békés
- District: Orosháza

Area
  - Total: 38.13 km^{2} (14.72 sq mi)

Population (2002)
  - Total: 4,095
  - Density: 107.4/km^{2} (278.2/sq mi)
- Time zone: UTC+1 (CET)
  - Summer (DST): UTC+2 (CEST)
- Postal code: 5932
- Area code: (+36) 68

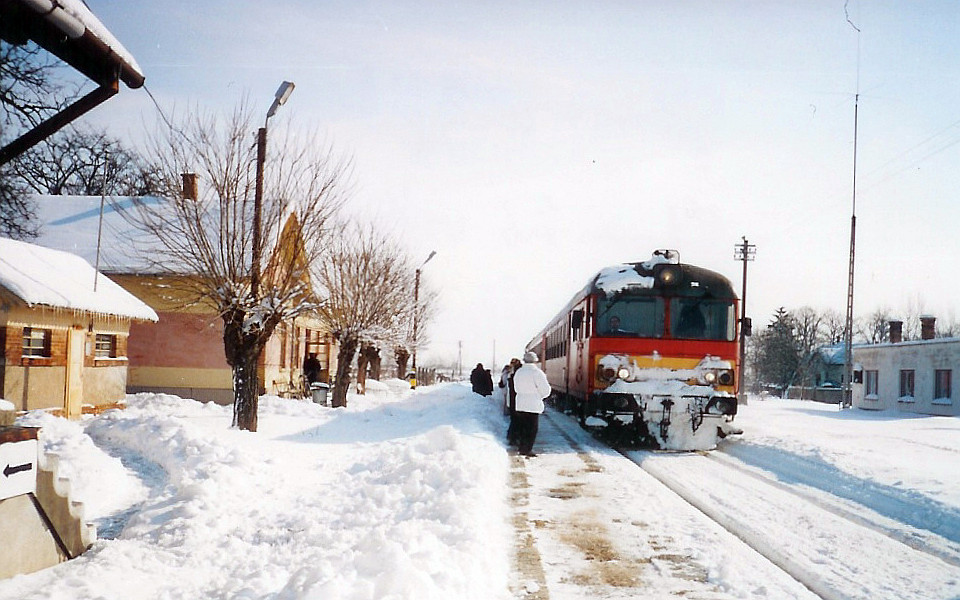
MDmot. Gádoros vasútállomás 2003-02-07, 147-gádoros1

Gádoros, known until 1901 as Bánfalva, is a large village in Békés County, in the Southern Great Plain region of south-east Hungary.

== Geography ==
It covers an area of 38.13 km² and has a population of 4095 people (2002). Photos from the village: http://www.gadoros.hu/album/pages/legifelv_jpg.htm
