= Dombegyház =

Coordinates: 46°20′19″N 21°7′52″E

- Large village
- Coat of arms
- Interactive map of Dombegyház
- Country: Hungary
- County: Békés
- District: Mezőkovácsháza

Area
  - Total: 57.96 km^{2} (22.38 sq mi)

Population (2002)
  - Total: 2,431
  - Density: 42/km^{2} (110/sq mi)
- Time zone: UTC+1 (CET)
  - Summer (DST): UTC+2 (CEST)
- Postal code: 5836
- Area code: (+36) 68

Dombegyház is a large village in Békés County, in the Southern Great Plain region of south-east Hungary.

== Geography ==
It covers an area of 57.96 km² and has a population of 2431 people (2002).
