= Kevermes =

Coordinates: 46°25′N 21°11′E

- Large village
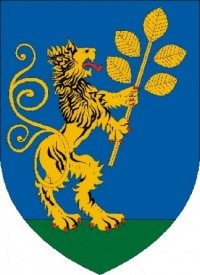
- Coat of arms
- Interactive map of Kevermes
- Country: Hungary
- County: Békés
- District: Mezőkovácsháza

Area
  - Total: 43.36 km^{2} (16.74 sq mi)

Population (2015)
  - Total: 2,049
  - Density: 47/km^{2} (120/sq mi)
- Time zone: UTC+1 (CET)
  - Summer (DST): UTC+2 (CEST)
- Postal code: 5744
- Area code: (+36) 68

Kevermes is a village in Békés County, in the Southern Great Plain region of south-east Hungary.

== Geography ==
It covers an area of 43.36 km^{2} and has a population of 2,049 people (2015).
