= Tótkomlós =

Town in Békés County, Hungary

Tótkomlós Slovenský Komlóš
- Town
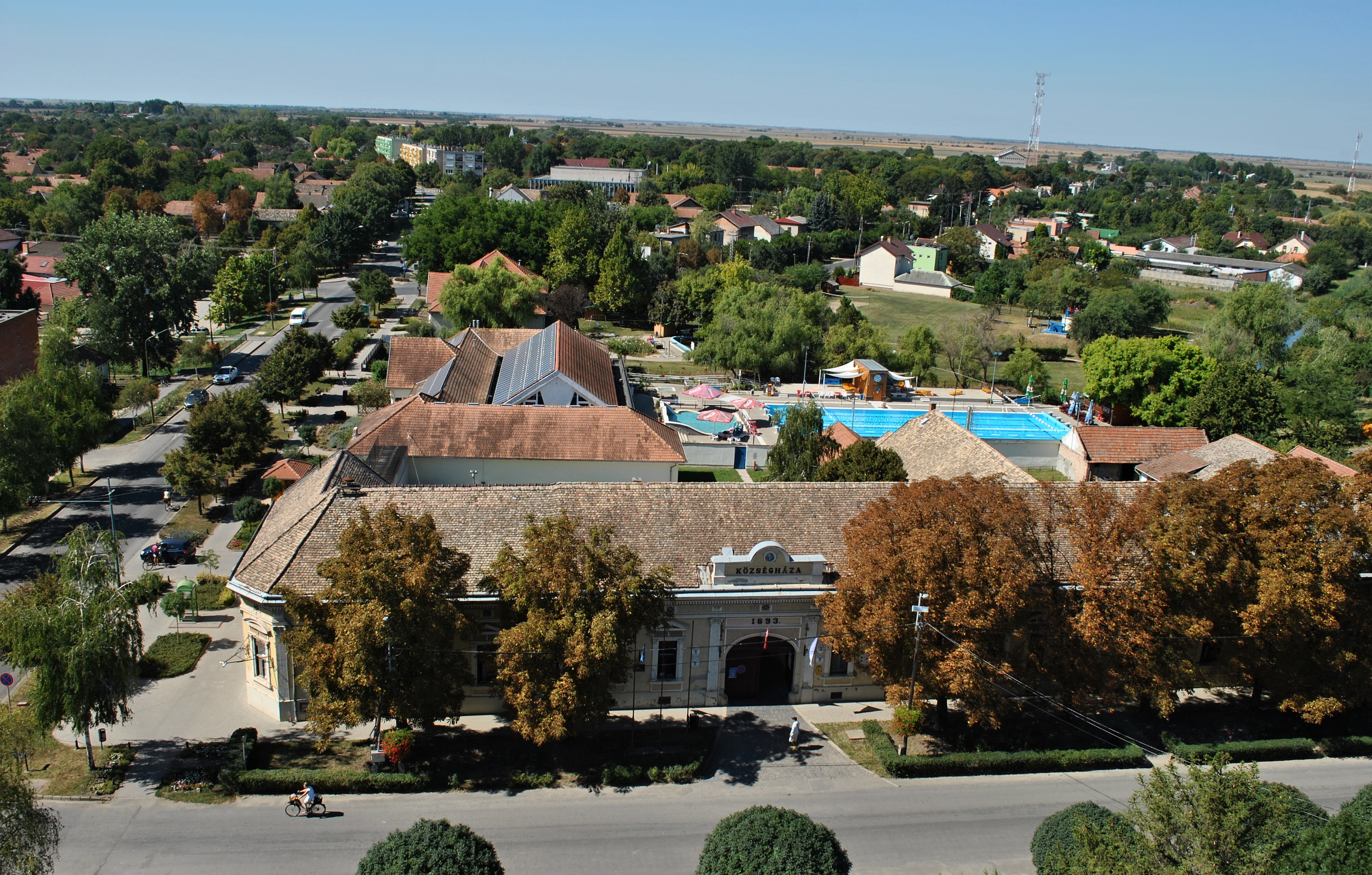
- View from the Lutheran church tower

- Flag Coat of arms

- Location of Tótkomlós in Hungary
- Coordinates: 46.417°N 20.733°E
- Country: Hungary
- County: Békés
- District: Orosháza
- Resettled: 1746
- Town status: 1 November 1993

Government
  - Mayor: Zoltán János Zsura (Ind.)

Area
  - Total: 125.05 km^{2} (48.28 sq mi)
- Elevation: 92 m (302 ft)

Population (1 January 2025)
  - Total: 5,146
  - Density: 41.15/km^{2} (106.6/sq mi)
- Time zone: UTC+1 (CET)
  - Summer (DST): UTC+2 (CEST)
- Postal code: 5940
- Area code: (+36) 68
- Website: www.totkomlos.hu

Tótkomlós (Slovak: Slovenský Komlóš) is a town in Békés County, south-eastern Hungary. It lies in the Orosháza District, on the Great Hungarian Plain, and has historically been one of the important centres of the Slovak community in Hungary. According to KSH-derived 2025 data, the town has an area of 125.05 km^{2} (48.28 sq mi) and a population of 5,146.

== Name ==
The second element of the name, Komlós, is connected with Hungarian komló, meaning hops. The prefix Tót is an older Hungarian term for Slovaks and some other Slavic-speaking groups. The town's Slovak name is Slovenský Komlóš.

== Geography and transport ==
Tótkomlós is situated in the Southern Great Plain region, on the Csongrád Plain, about 18 km (11 mi) south of Orosháza. It lies between Orosháza and Mezőhegyes; the main local road connections include the Orosháza–Mezőhegyes, Békéscsaba–Makó and Békéssámson–Hódmezővásárhely routes.

Tótkomlós railway station is on MÁV line 125, the Mezőtúr–Battonya railway line, between Kardoskút and Nagyér.

== History ==
=== Early and medieval settlement ===
Archaeological finds show settlement in the area before the modern town. La Tène-period graves have been reported from Tótkomlós, and the wider area has yielded traces of early Hungarian and Árpád-era settlement.

The medieval village of Kopáncs, now represented by the Nagykopáncs area associated with Tótkomlós, is first known from the Várad Register in 1219. It was also mentioned in 1231 and 1481, and is thought to have been destroyed during the Ottoman period. The Nagykopáncs chapel, a Romanesque building traditionally dated to the Árpád era, is one of the principal medieval monuments in the vicinity.

During the later Middle Ages the Komlós estate was connected with the Hunyadi family. County histories record it as a possession of John Hunyadi and, in 1484, as property of Matthias Corvinus, who granted it to his son John Corvinus.

=== Ottoman period and resettlement ===
The medieval settlement was repeatedly affected by the wars of the Ottoman period. County histories state that its inhabitants fled in the mid-16th century and that the village was recorded as deserted or almost deserted at different points during the wars; later records describe the area as a puszta, or depopulated estate.

After the Ottoman period the depopulated Komlós estate came into the possession of Baron József Rudnyánszky. On 8 January 1746, Rudnyánszky concluded an agreement with Slovak Lutheran settlers from Szentandrás, and about eighty Slovak families settled on the Komlós estate. This resettlement forms the foundation of the modern town. The settlers built houses, a school and a prayer house; the large Lutheran church, still one of the town's main landmarks, was built in 1795.

=== Nineteenth and twentieth centuries ===
By the nineteenth century Tótkomlós had developed into a sizeable agricultural community. Population growth also led to land pressure and emigration to other settlements in the region. The town hall was built in 1893, and the settlement was connected to the railway network in the same period.

The Slovak character of the settlement remained important into the twentieth century. The Czechoslovak–Hungarian population exchange after the Second World War had a major demographic effect on the town. The municipal history states that 939 families, or 3,254 inhabitants, left Tótkomlós for Czechoslovakia, while about 400 Hungarian-speaking families, roughly 1,500 people, were resettled in the town. The exchange contributed to the decline of the Slovak majority and to the later Hungarian-speaking majority in the town.

Tótkomlós was declared a town on 1 November 1993. The current mayor is Zoltán János Zsura, an independent politician, who was elected in the 2024 Hungarian local elections.

== Demographics ==
The town has a long-standing Slovak minority. In the 2011 census, 21.5% of residents declared Slovak nationality, 82.7% Hungarian nationality, 2.0% Roma nationality, 0.6% German nationality and 0.6% Romanian nationality; multiple identities could be declared, so the total exceeded 100%.

In the 2022 census, 90.8% of those counted declared Hungarian nationality, 12.2% Slovak nationality, 1.5% Roma nationality, 0.5% German nationality and 0.5% Romanian nationality; 8.7% did not answer the nationality question. In the same census, the largest religious categories were non-religious residents, Lutherans, Roman Catholics and Reformed Christians.

== Sights and culture ==
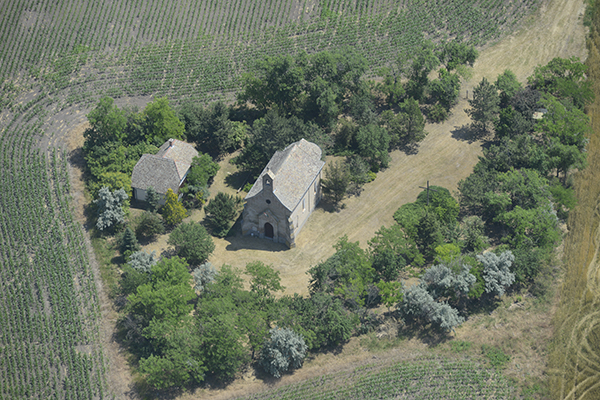
Nagykopáncs Árpád-era chapel

Important sights include the late Baroque Lutheran church, the Nagykopáncs chapel, the Slovak folk house, the Slovak ethnographic collection, the farmstead museum, the town centre and memorials in Erzsébet Park. The town's Slovak heritage is also represented by the Slovak settlement memorial, unveiled in 2007, and by museum collections preserving the everyday culture of the local Slovak population.

Rózsa Bath is the town's main spa and leisure facility. The municipal description identifies it as part of the Southern Great Plain thermal route; its services are based on 46 °C alkaline hydrogen-carbonate mineral water and include swimming, wellness and balneotherapy services.

== Notable people ==
- János Jankó (1833–1896), painter, caricaturist and graphic artist
- Pál Závada (born 1954), writer, editor and sociologist
- Zsuzsa Gyurkovics (born 1929), actress and recipient of the Jászai Mari Award

== Twin towns – sister cities ==
Tótkomlós is twinned with:

- Neunkirchen am Brand, Germany (2000)
- Brețcu, Romania (1995)
- Nădlac, Romania (1997)
- Kanjiža, Serbia (2009)
- Zvolen, Slovakia (1995)
- Galanta, Slovakia (1999)
- Jelšava, Slovakia (2004)
- Gerasdorf bei Wien, Austria (2022)
