= Nagyszénás =

- Large village
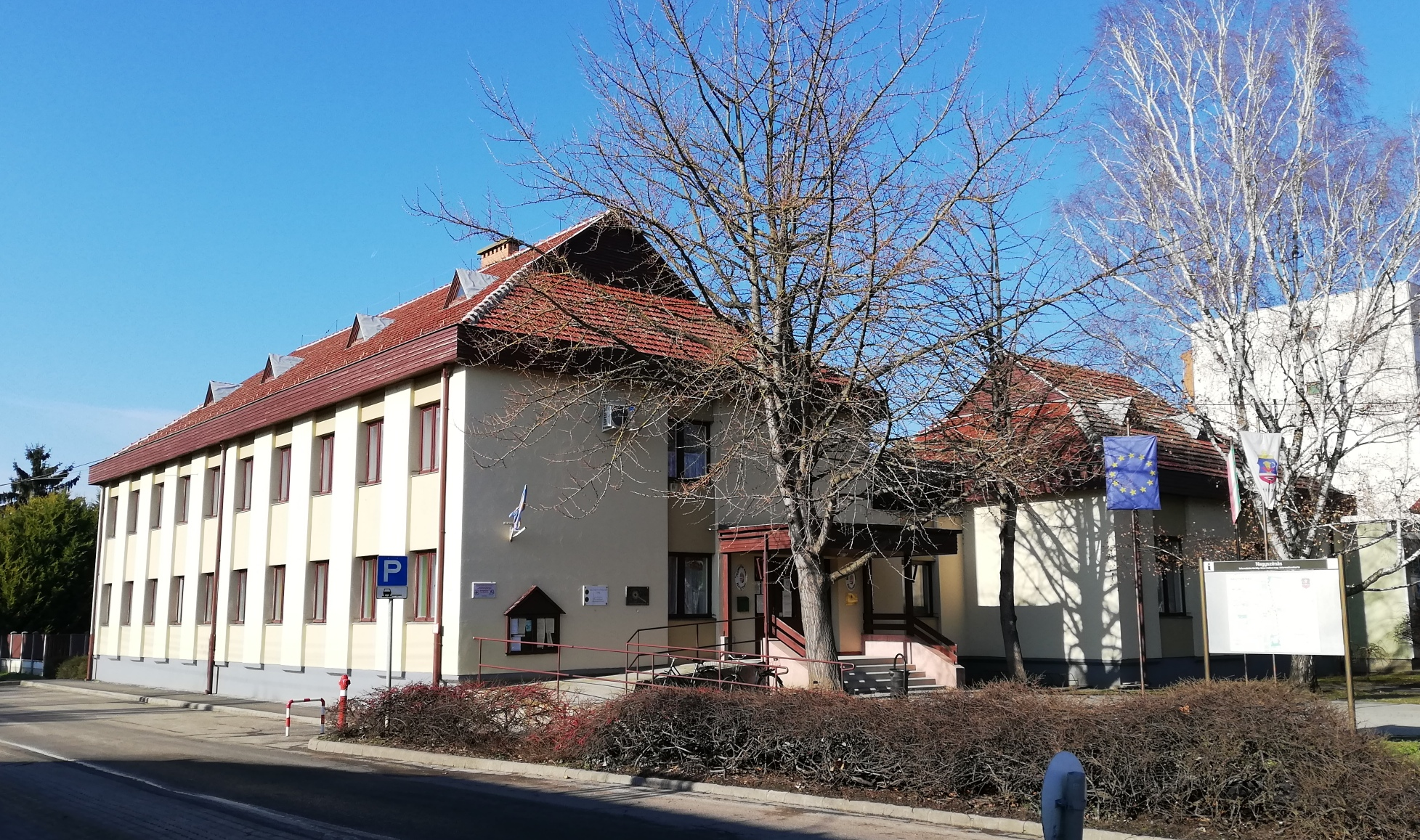
- Parish hall of Nagyszénás

- Flag Coat of arms

- Location within Hungary
- Coordinates: 46°41′N 20°41′E
- Country: Hungary
- County: Békés
- District: Orosháza

Area
  - Total: 95.56 km^{2} (36.90 sq mi)

Population (2013)
  - Total: 5,063
  - Density: 54/km^{2} (140/sq mi)
- Time zone: UTC+1 (CET)
  - Summer (DST): UTC+2 (CEST)
- Postal code: 5931
- Area code: (+36) 68

Nagyszénás is a large village in Békés County, in the Southern Great Plain region of south-east Hungary.

== Main sights ==
- "Park" Bath of Nagyszénás
- Kiss György Observatory
- the Evangelist Church
- the Our Lady Catholic Church

== Geography ==
It covers an area of 95.56 km^{2} and has a population of 5063 people (2013). The nearest town is Orosháza.
