= Medgyesegyháza =

Town in Békés County, Hungary

Medgyesegyháza Medeš
- Town
- Flag Coat of arms

- Location within Hungary
- Coordinates: 46.50°N 21.03°E
- Country: Hungary
- County: Békés
- District: Mezőkovácsháza

Area
  - Total: 64.32 km^{2} (24.83 sq mi)

Population (2015)
  - Total: 3,558
  - Density: 55.32/km^{2} (143.3/sq mi)
- Time zone: UTC+1 (CET)
  - Summer (DST): UTC+2 (CEST)
- Postal code: 5666
- Area code: (+36) 68
- Website: www.medgyesegyhaza.hu

Medgyesegyháza (Slovak: Medeš) is a town in Békés County, in the Southern Great Plain region of south-east Hungary.

== Geography ==
It covers an area of 64.32 km^{2} (24.83 sq mi) and has a population of 3,558 people (2015).

== History ==
=== The Jews in the city ===
The Jewish community in the city was established in the second half of the 19th century and most of them were engaged in the grain trade.

The synagogue was built in 1870 and the community had a Jewish school.

In 1942, young Jews from the city were sent to forced labor and sent to the front of Ukraine, where the Hungarians fought alongside the Germans. Four townspeople were killed.

In 1944, after the Germans entered Hungary, all the local Jews were rounded up and finally transferred to Békéscsaba. Most of them were taken to the Auschwitz extermination camp.

After the war, 20 survivors returned to the town. The community was reorganized, but many dispersed within a short time.

== Politics ==
The current mayor of Medgyesegyháza is Dr. Béla Nagy (Independent).

The local Municipal Assembly has 6+1 members divided into this political parties and alliances:

Party	Seats	2014 Council
Fidesz-KDNP	3	
Independent	2	
Unity (MSZP-DK-Együtt-Liberálisok)	1	

City Mayors from 1990
Dr. Béla Nagy (SZDSZ)	1990–2010
Márton Ruck (Fidesz)	2010–2014
Dr. Béla Nagy (Independent); – II.	2014–

== Twin towns – sister cities ==
Medgyesegyháza is twinned with:

- Kolárovo, Slovakia
