= Pusztaottlaka =

Coordinates: 46°33′N 20°59′E

Pusztaottlaka Otlaca-Pustă
- Coat of arms
- Interactive map of Pusztaottlaka
- Country: Hungary
- County: Békés

Population (2015)
  - Total: 474
  - Density: 25.1/km^{2} (65/sq mi)
- Time zone: UTC+1 (CET)
  - Summer (DST): UTC+2 (CEST)
- Postal code: 5665
- Area code: 68

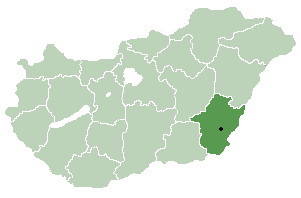
Location of Békés County in Hungary

Pusztaottlaka (Puszta-Ott·lak·a; Romanian: Otlaca-Pustă) is a village in Békés County, in the Southern Great Plain region of south-east Hungary.

== Geography ==
It covers an area of 18.88 km^{2} and has a population of 471 people (2002).

== Population ==
According to the last census in 2015 Pusztaottlaka/Otlaca-Pusta had a population of 474 people. The majority of the population is Hungarian with a 17% Romanian minority (74 people who spoke Romanian as a mother language).

== Religion ==
According to the last census in 2001 133 people belonged to the Roman Catholic Church, 40 were Lutherans and 140 people followed "another faith". In the case of Pusztaottlaka/Otlaca-Pusta the latters are mainly Orthodox Romanians.

== Name ==
Pusztaottlaka means "dwelling place on the puszta" in Hungarian. The Romanian name is the transliteration of the Hungarian one.
