= Békéssámson =

Coordinates: 46°25′N 20°38′E

- Interactive map of Békéssámson
- Country: Hungary
- County: Békés

Area
  - Total: 71.25 km^{2} (27.51 sq mi)

Population (2015)
  - Total: 2,381
  - Density: 33.4/km^{2} (87/sq mi)
- Time zone: UTC+1 (CET)
  - Summer (DST): UTC+2 (CEST)
- Postal code: 5946
- Area code: 68

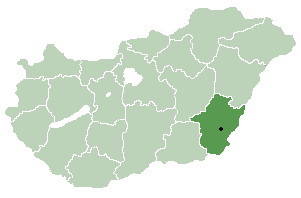
Location of Békés County in Hungary

Békéssámson is a village in Békés County, in the Southern Great Plain region of south-east Hungary.

== Geography ==
It covers an area of 71.25 km^{2} and has a population of 2,381 people (2015).
