= Battonya =

Battonya Bătania, Batanja
- Town
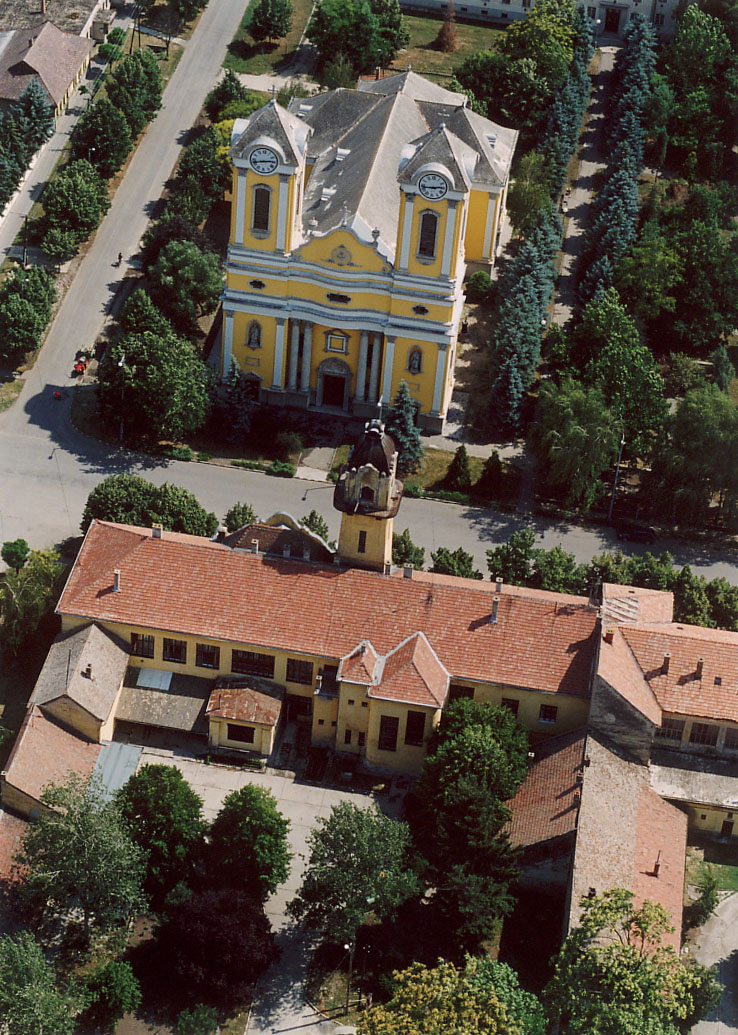
- Aerial photography: Battonya - Temple

- Flag Coat of arms

- Location within Hungary
- Coordinates: 46°17′N 21°1′E
- Country: Hungary
- County: Békés
- District: Mezőkovácsháza

Area
  - Total: 145.71 km^{2} (56.26 sq mi)

Population (2023)
  - Total: 4,966
  - Density: 34.08/km^{2} (88.3/sq mi)
- Time zone: UTC+1 (CET)
  - Summer (DST): UTC+2 (CEST)
- Postal code: 5830
- Area code: (+36) 68
- Website: www.battonya.hu

Battonya (Romanian: Bătania; Serbian: Батања, romanized: Batanja) is a town in Békés County, in the Southern Great Plain region of south-east Hungary. Residents are Hungarians and Romanians, with a minority of Serbs.

== Geography ==
It covers an area of 145.77 km^{2} and has a population of 4,966 people (2023).

== History ==
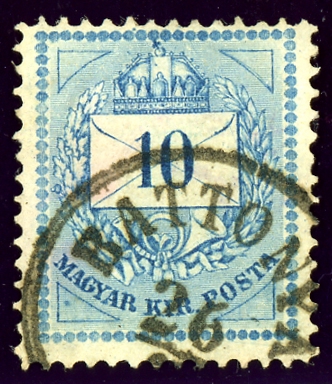
Kingdom of Hungary stamp, issue 1874, cancelled at Battonya

After the Ottoman occupation until 1699, Battonya was part of the Austrian monarchy, province of Hungary; in Transleithania after the compromise of 1867 in the Kingdom of Hungary.

=== The Jews in the city ===
The Jewish community in the city was established in the second half of the 19th century and most of the Jews in the settlement were merchants and industrialists.

The synagogue was built in 1896 and the community had a Jewish school.

In 1942, young Jews from the city were sent to forced labor.

In 1944, after the Germans entered Hungary, the head of the congregation and some of the community's dignitaries were arrested, and on May 13, all the local Jews were rounded up and finally transferred to Békéscsaba. Most of them were taken to the Auschwitz extermination camp.

After the war, three survivors returned from Auschwitz, six from forced labor and eighty from Austria. The community was reorganized, but many dispersed within a short time. In the 1970s, only a few Jews lived there.

=== The Romanians in the city ===
According to recent estimates and data provided by local authorities and the media, over 1,000 houses out of a total of approximately 2,300-2,500 in the city have been purchased by Romanian citizens since 2006.

Out of a total population of approximately 5,000 inhabitants, it is estimated that over 2,000 are Romanians who have settled there or commute daily to their jobs in Arad and Timișoara.

With Romania joining the Schengen area in 2025, it is expected that Romanians will buy even more houses on the Hungarian border. Battonya is expected to have a population of 7,000 within two to three years. Other sources mention that approximately every second house, half of the properties, belonged to Romanians as early as 2024.

== Notable people ==
- Endre Gyulay (1930–2024), Roman-Catholic bishop
- Bronko Lubich (1925–2007), professional wrestler
- Frigyes Puja (1921–2008), politician
- Emil Purgly (1880–1964), politician

== Twin towns – sister cities ==
Battonya is twinned with:

- Pecica, Romania (1996)
- Beočin, Serbia (1997)
- Lipova, Romania (1997)
