= Kunágota =

Coordinates: 46°26′N 21°03′E

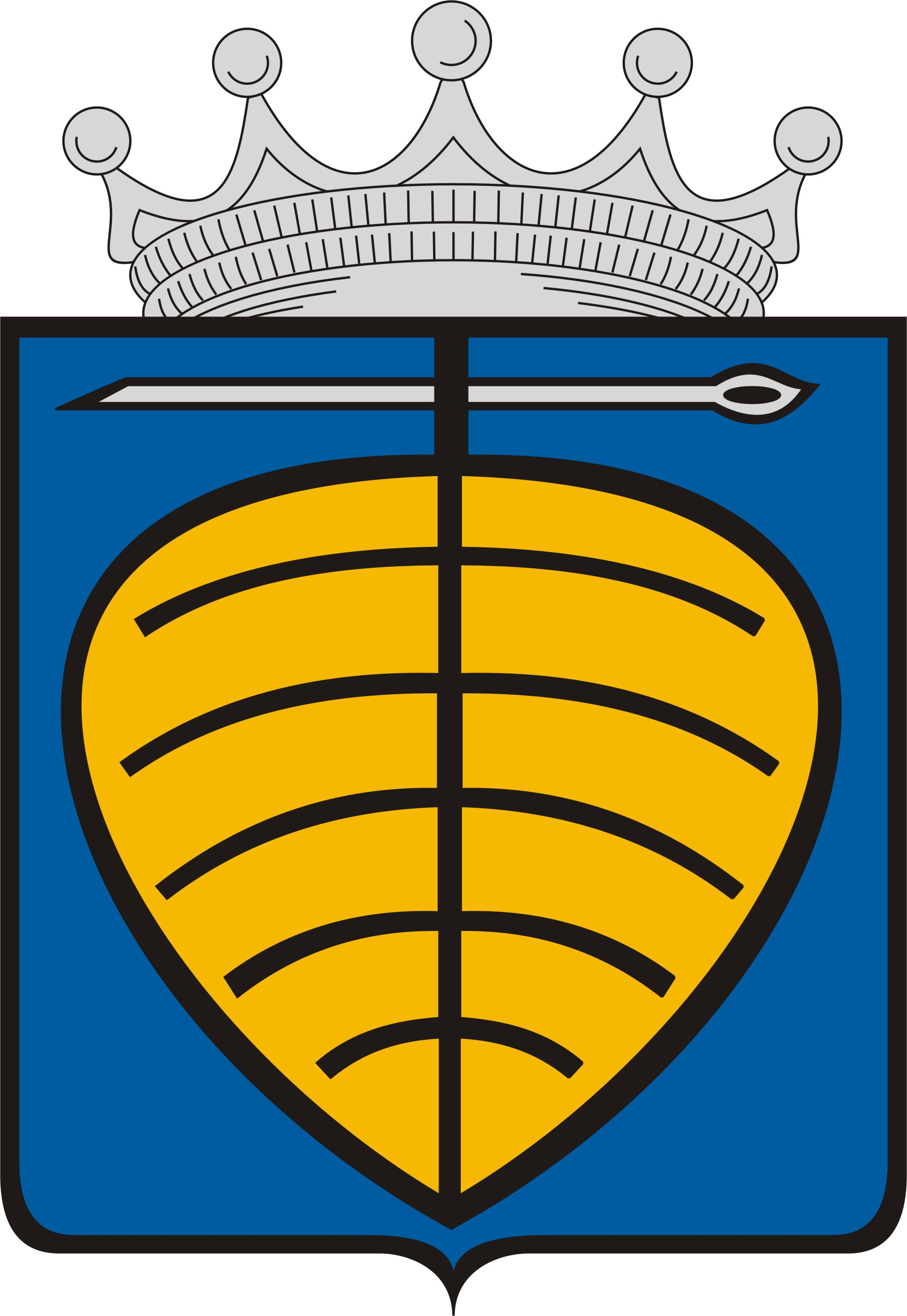
- Coat of arms
- Interactive map of Kunágota
- Country: Hungary
- County: Békés

Area
  - Total: 63.99 km^{2} (24.71 sq mi)

Population (2015)
  - Total: 2,650
  - Density: 41.4/km^{2} (107/sq mi)
- Time zone: UTC+1 (CET)
  - Summer (DST): UTC+2 (CEST)
- Postal code: 5746
- Area code: 68

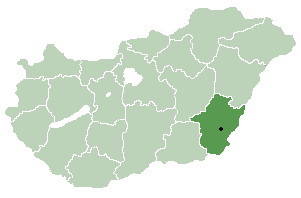
Location of Békés County in Hungary

Kunágota is a village in Békés County, in the Southern Great Plain region of south-east Hungary.

On St David's Day 1 March 2021 a heartfelt gesture was inspired by the people of Kunágota, branded Hungary's "Welshest" village, to honour the patron saint of Wales and the Welsh people by illuminating a nearby Castle with the national flag of Wales, which has a striking Dragon. To show respect they sang traditional Welsh hymns such as ‘Cwm Rhondda’, and composed a new piece of music called St David's Mystery. The piece was written by French Hungarian composer George Gondard.

The town had grown very fond of Wales ever since Elizabeth, a Kunágota-born classical singer, returned to her roots from Cardiff and introduced Welsh hymns to the community a few years ago

In the 19th century, a small Jewish community lived in the village, many of whose members were murdered in the Holocaust

== Geography ==
It covers an area of 63.99 km^{2} and has a population of 2650 people (2015).
