= List of members of the National Assembly of Hungary (2018–2022) =

National Assembly of Hungary (2018–2022)

Type
- Type: unicameral
- Houses: National Assembly

History
- Founded: 8 May 2018
- Disbanded: 2 May 2022 (3 years, 359 days)
- Preceded by: Members 2014–2018
- Succeeded by: Members 2022–2026

Leadership
- Speaker: László Kövér, Fidesz

Structure
- Seats: 199
- Political groups: At opening: Government (133): Fidesz (117); KDNP (16); Opposition (65): Jobbik (26); MSZP–Dialogue (20); DK (9); LMP (8); Together (1); Ind. (1); Other (1): MNÖÖ (1)

Elections
- Last election: 8 April 2018
- Next election: 3 April 2022

Meeting place
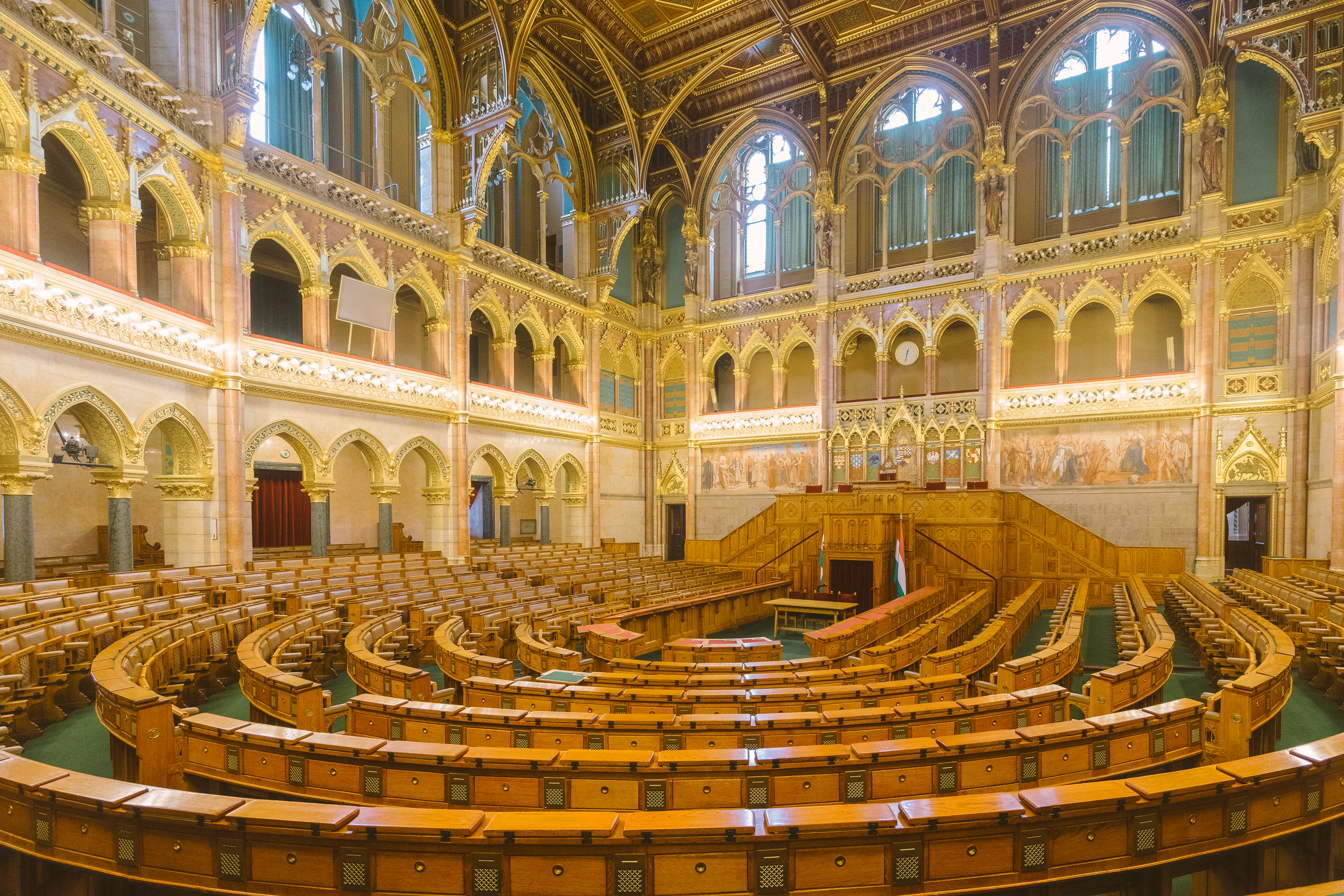
- Hungarian Parliament Building, Budapest

The list of members of the National Assembly of Hungary (2018–2022) is the list of members of the National Assembly – the unicameral legislative body of Hungary – according to the outcome of the Hungarian parliamentary election of 2018.

== Officials ==
=== Speaker ===
- László Kövér (Fidesz)

=== First Officer ===
- Márta Mátrai (Fidesz)

=== Deputy Speaker for Legislation ===
- Csaba Hende (Fidesz)

=== Deputy Speakers ===
- Koloman Brenner (Jobbik) (July 3, 2020 – May 1, 2022)
- István Hiller (MSZP)
- István Jakab (Fidesz)
- János Latorcai (KDNP)
- Sándor Lezsák (Fidesz)
- Tamás Sneider (Jobbik) (May 8, 2018 – May 27, 2020)

=== Recorders ===
- András Aradszki (KDNP) (June 29, 2020 – May 1, 2022)
- Gergely Arató (DK)
- Sándor Bodó (Fidesz) (May 8, 2018 – June 12, 2018)
- László Földi (KDNP)
- Attila Gelencsér (Fidesz)
- Csaba Gyüre (Jobbik) (June 29, 2020 – May 1, 2022)
- Dezső Hiszékeny (MSZP)
- László György Lukács (Jobbik) (February 18, 2019 – May 1, 2022)
- József Attila Móring (KDNP)
- István Simicskó (KDNP) (June 4, 2018 – June 29, 2020)
- Ádám Steinmetz (Jobbik) (June 29, 2020 – May 1, 2022)
- Sándor Szabó (MSZP)
- István Szávay (Jobbik) (May 8, 2018 – December 10, 2018)
- György Szilágyi (Jobbik) (May 8, 2018 – June 4, 2020)
- Lajos Szűcs (Fidesz)
- István Tiba (Fidesz)
- Bence Tordai (PM)
- László Varga (MSZP)
- Győző Vinnai (Fidesz) (July 2, 2018 – May 1, 2022)

=== Father of the House ===
- Béla Turi-Kovács (Fidesz) (age 82 in 2018)

Results of the election

=== Baby of the House ===
- Péter Ungár (LMP) (age 26 in 2018)

==== Senior Recorders ====
- Tibor Bana (Jobbik) (age 32 in 2018)
- Attila Barcza (Fidesz) (age 33 in 2018)
- Anett Bősz (PM) (age 31 in 2018)
- Dóra Dúró (Jobbik) (age 31 in 2018)
- Gergely Farkas (Jobbik) (age 31 in 2018)
- Lőrinc Nacsa (KDNP) (age 28 in 2018)
- János Stummer (Jobbik) (age 33 in 2018)

== Parliamentary groups ==

↓
133	26	20	9	9	1	1
Fidesz–KDNP	Jobbik	MSZP–PM	DK	LMP	I	MNOÖ

Groups		Members		Chairperson(s)		Status
Groups		At foundation 8 May 2018	At dissolvation 1 May 2022	Chairperson(s)		Status
Fidesz–KDNP Coalition	Fidesz	117 / 199	116 / 199	Máté Kocsis	8 May 2018 – 1 May 2022	Government
Fidesz–KDNP Coalition	Christian Democratic People's Party (KDNP)	16 / 199	17 / 199	Péter Harrach	8 May 2018 – 14 July 2020	Government
Fidesz–KDNP Coalition	Christian Democratic People's Party (KDNP)	16 / 199	17 / 199	István Simicskó	14 July 2020 – 1 May 2022	Government
Jobbik		26 / 199	17 / 199	Márton Gyöngyösi	8 May 2018 – 24 June 2019	Opposition
Jobbik		26 / 199	17 / 199	Péter Jakab	24 June 2019 – 1 May 2022	Opposition
MSZP–PM Coalition	Hungarian Socialist Party (MSZP)	15 / 199	15 / 199	Bertalan Tóth	8 May 2018 – 1 May 2022	Opposition
MSZP–PM Coalition	Dialogue for Hungary (PM)	5 / 199	5 / 199	Tímea Szabó	8 May 2018 – 1 May 2022	Opposition
Politics Can Be Different (LMP)		9 / 199	6 / 199	Bernadett Szél	8 May 2018 – 15 September 2018	Opposition
Politics Can Be Different (LMP)		9 / 199	6 / 199	László Lóránt Keresztes	16 September 2018 – 1 May 2022	Opposition
Democratic Coalition (DK)		9 / 199	9 / 199	Ferenc Gyurcsány	8 May 2018 – 1 May 2022	Opposition
Independent		1 / 199	13 / 199	–	–	Opposition
German minority		1 / 199	1 / 199	–	–	Other
Source: Országgyűlés

== Members of the National Assembly ==
=== By name ===
No.	Name	Party	Born	district	list
1	Péter Ágh	Fidesz	30 January 1982	Vas County 2.vk.	–
2	Balázs Ander	Jobbik	11 December 1976	–	Jobbik National List, no. 19
3	István Apáti	Independent	23 March 1978	–	Jobbik National List, no. 22
4	András Aradszki	KDNP	22 May 1956	Pest County 1.vk.	–
5	Gergely Arató	DK	23 November 1968	–	DK National List, no. 11
6	László B. Nagy	Fidesz	9 February 1958	Csongrád-Csanád County 2.vk.	–
7	István Bajkai	Fidesz	17 January 1964	–	Fidesz-KDNP National List, no. 20
8	Zoltán Balczó from 8 July 2019	Jobbik	24 March 1948	–	Jobbik National List, no. 183
9	György Balla	Fidesz	11 August 1962	–	Fidesz-KDNP National List, no. 33
10	Mihály Balla	Fidesz	21 May 1965	Nógrád County 2.vk.	–
11	Tibor Bana	Independent	1 December 1985	–	Jobbik National List, no. 20
12	Ildikó Bangó-Borbély	MSZP	29 March 1972	–	MSZP-P National List, no. 14
13	Erik Bánki	Fidesz	26 May 1970	–	Fidesz-KDNP National List, no. 35
14	Gábor Bányai	Fidesz	27 August 1969	Bács-Kiskun County 5.vk.	–
15	Attila Barcza	Fidesz	20 February 1985	Győr-Moson-Sopron County 4.vk.	–
16	Mónika Bartos	Fidesz	24 December 1975	–	Fidesz-KDNP National List, no. 67
17	Károly Becsó	Fidesz	29 October 1973	Nógrád County 1.vk.	–
18	Zsolt Becsó	Fidesz	14 June 1967	–	Fidesz-KDNP National List, no. 69
19	János Bencsik	Fidesz	31 July 1965	Komárom-Esztergom County 1.vk.	–
20	János Bencsik from 18 February 2019	Independent	21 June 1985	–	Jobbik National List, no. 50
21	Márk Bíró	Fidesz	1974	–	Fidesz-KDNP National List, no. 38
22	Sándor Bodó	Fidesz	25 November 1963	Hajdú-Bihar County 5.vk.	–
23	István Boldog	Fidesz	10 November 1966	Jász-Nagykun-Szolnok County 4.vk.	–
24	Zoltán Bóna	Fidesz	9 May 1981	Pest County 8.vk.	–
25	László Böröcz	Fidesz	11 November 1983	–	Fidesz-KDNP National List, no. 16
26	Anett Bősz	DK	18 December 1986	–	MSZP-P National List, no. 15
27	Koloman Brenner	Jobbik	28 May 1968	–	Jobbik National List, no. 23
28	Gyula Budai from 29 October 2018	Fidesz	2 April 1963	–	Fidesz-KDNP National List, no. 146
29	Sándor Burány	P (MSZP)	19 August 1956	Budapest 9.vk.	–
30	Tamás Csányi from 18 February 2019	Jobbik	1 December 1975	–	Jobbik National List, no. 35
31	Antal Csárdi	LMP	8 November 1976	Budapest 1.vk.	–
32	Zsolt Csenger-Zalán	Fidesz	22 August 1957	Pest County 2.vk.	–
33	Péter Cseresnyés	Fidesz	9 January 1960	Zala County 3.vk.	–
34	Katalin Csöbör	Fidesz	20 January 1965	Borsod-Abaúj-Zemplén County 1.vk.	–
35	György Czerván	Fidesz	12 July 1959	Pest County 9.vk.	–
36	Judit Czunyi-Bertalan	Fidesz	6 August 1974	Komárom-Esztergom County 3.vk.	–
37	Béla Dankó	Fidesz	13 May 1969	Békés County 2.vk.	–
38	Márta Demeter	LMP	6 March 1983	–	LMP National List, no. 7
39	Zoltán Demeter	Fidesz	1 December 1963	Borsod-Abaúj-Zemplén County 4.vk.	–
40	Csaba Dömötör	Fidesz	13 September 1982	–	Fidesz-KDNP National List, no. 64
41	Róbert Dudás from 18 November 2019	Jobbik	11 December 1973	–	Jobbik National List, no. 42
42	Mónika Dunai	Fidesz	21 September 1966	Budapest 14.vk.	–
43	Dóra Dúró	Independent	5 March 1987	–	Jobbik National List, no. 3
44	Flórián Farkas	Fidesz	4 September 1957	–	Fidesz-KDNP National List, no. 17
45	Gergely Farkas	Independent	3 November 1986	–	Jobbik National List, no. 12
46	Sándor Farkas	Fidesz	18 September 1953	Csongrád-Csanád County 3.vk.	–
47	Sándor Fazekas	Fidesz	3 May 1963	–	Fidesz-KDNP National List, no. 27
48	Zoltán Fenyvesi	Fidesz	14 October 1964	Veszprém County 3.vk.	–
49	János Fónagy	Fidesz	11 July 1942	–	Fidesz-KDNP National List, no. 21
50	Sándor Font	Fidesz	23 November 1960	Bács-Kiskun County 3.vk.	–
51	László Földi	KDNP	7 September 1952	Pest County 12.vk.	–
52	Erik Fülöp	Independent	21 July 1982	–	Jobbik National List, no. 9
53	Attila Gelencsér	Fidesz	14 January 1968	Somogy County 1.vk.	–
54	Gergely Gulyás	Fidesz	21 September 1981	Budapest 3.vk.	–
55	Zita Gurmai	MSZP	1 June 1965	–	MSZP-P National List, no. 10
56	Alpár Gyopáros	Fidesz	15 May 1978	Győr-Moson-Sopron County 3.vk.	–
57	Balázs Győrffy	Fidesz	21 April 1979	–	Fidesz-KDNP National List, no. 13
58	Ferenc Gyurcsány	DK	4 June 1961	–	DK National List, no. 1
59	Csaba Gyüre from 1 April 2019	Jobbik	19 May 1965	–	Jobbik National List, no. 38
60	Ákos Hadházy	Independent	4 March 1974	–	LMP National List, no. 2
61	Sándor Hadházy	Fidesz	10 August 1956	Pest County 3.vk.	–
62	László Hajdu	DK	23 August 1947	Budapest 12.vk.	–
63	János Halász	Fidesz	11 May 1963	–	Fidesz-KDNP National List, no. 72
64	Tamás Harangozó	MSZP	27 June 1979	–	MSZP-P National List, no. 16
65	János Hargitai	KDNP	24 April 1958	Baranya County 3.vk.	–
66	Péter Harrach	KDNP	2 November 1947	–	Fidesz-KDNP National List, no. 10
67	Dávid Héjj	Fidesz		–	Fidesz-KDNP National List, no. 65
68	Csaba Hende	Fidesz	5 February 1960	Vas County 1.vk.	–
69	Tamás Herczeg	Fidesz	16 November 1960	Békés County 1.vk.	–
70	István Hiller	MSZP	7 May 1964	Budapest 16.vk.	–
71	Dezső Hiszékeny	MSZP	22 February 1956	Budapest 7.vk.	–
72	Krisztina Hohn from 11 June 2018	LMP	16 June 1972	–	LMP National List, no. 12
73	István Hollik from 18 February 2019	KDNP	23 January 1982	–	Fidesz-KDNP National List, no. 132
74	Péter Hoppál	Fidesz	15 November 1972	Baranya County 2.vk.	–
75	István Horváth	Fidesz	28 February 1970	Tolna County 1.vk.	–
76	László Horváth	Fidesz	24 April 1962	Heves County 2.vk.	–
77	Richárd Hörcsik	Fidesz	23 December 1955	Borsod-Abaúj-Zemplén County 5.vk.	–
78	György Hubay	Fidesz	7 August 1954	Borsod-Abaúj-Zemplén County 2.vk.	–
79	István Jakab	Fidesz	17 September 1949	–	Fidesz-KDNP National List, no. 12
80	Péter Jakab	Jobbik	16 August 1980	–	Jobbik National List, no. 15
81	Hajnalka Juhász	KDNP	1980	–	Fidesz-KDNP National List, no. 39
82	Mária Kállai	Fidesz	5 December 1957	Jász-Nagykun-Szolnok County 1.vk.	–
83	Gergely Kálló from 9 March 2020	Jobbik	9 January 1985	Fejér County 4.vk.	–
84	Ákos Kara	Fidesz	21 May 1975	Győr-Moson-Sopron County 2.vk.	–
85	János Kerényi	Fidesz	9 December 1945	–	Fidesz-KDNP National List, no. 36
86	László Lóránt Keresztes	LMP	22 June 1975	–	LMP National List, no. 6
87	Máté Kocsis	Fidesz	6 May 1981	Budapest 6.vk.	–
88	Olivio Kocsis-Cake from 11 June 2018	P	31 March 1980	–	MSZP-P National List, no. 99
89	Zsófia Koncz from 2 November 2020	Fidesz	1990	Borsod-Abaúj-Zemplén County 6.vk.	–
90	Károly Kontrát	Fidesz	12 April 1956	Veszprém County 2.vk.	–
91	Lajos Korózs	MSZP	7 September 1958	–	MSZP-P National List, no. 12
92	Lajos Kósa	Fidesz	14 March 1964	Hajdú-Bihar County 1.vk.	–
93	József Kovács	Fidesz	5 July 1951	Békés County 3.vk.	–
94	Sándor Kovács	Fidesz	15 July 1966	Szabolcs-Szatmár-Bereg County 5.vk.	–
95	Sándor F. Kovács	Fidesz	19 June 1968	Jász-Nagykun-Szolnok County 3.vk.	–
96	Zoltán Kovács	Fidesz	1 December 1957	Veszprém County 4.vk.	–
97	László Kövér	Fidesz	29 December 1959	–	Fidesz-KDNP National List, no. 3
98	Gábor Kubatov	Fidesz	17 February 1966	–	Fidesz-KDNP National List, no. 7
99	Ágnes Kunhalmi	MSZP	31 October 1982	Budapest 15.vk.	–
100	János Latorcai	KDNP	9 May 1944	–	Fidesz-KDNP National List, no. 22
101	János Lázár	Fidesz	19 February 1975	Csongrád-Csanád County 4.vk.	–
102	Sándor Lezsák	Fidesz	30 October 1949	Bács-Kiskun County 4.vk.	–
103	László György Lukács	Jobbik	7 March 1983	–	Jobbik National List, no. 18
104	Zoltán Magyar	Jobbik	28 February 1982	–	Jobbik National List, no. 21
105	Jenő Manninger	Fidesz	30 July 1955	Zala County 2.vk.	–
106	Márta Mátrai	Fidesz	22 February 1948	–	Fidesz-KDNP National List, no. 18
107	Tamás Mellár	P (Independent)	22 January 1954	Baranya County 1.vk.	–
108	Attila Mesterházy	MSZP	30 January 1974	–	MSZP-P National List, no. 8
109	Ágnes Molnár	Fidesz	12 May 1956	–	Fidesz-KDNP National List, no. 34
110	Gyula Molnár	MSZP	17 August 1961	Budapest 18.vk.	–
111	Zsolt Molnár	MSZP	4 October 1974	–	MSZP-P National List, no. 9
112	József Attila Móring	KDNP	8 October 1968	Somogy County 3.vk.	–
113	Lőrinc Nacsa	KDNP	5 April 1990	–	Fidesz-KDNP National List, no. 71
114	Csaba Nagy	Fidesz	1970	Baranya County 4.vk.	–
115	István Nagy	Fidesz	6 October 1967	Győr-Moson-Sopron County 5.vk.	–
116	Szilárd Németh	Fidesz	24 April 1964	–	Fidesz-KDNP National List, no. 8
117	Zsolt Németh	Fidesz	14 October 1963	–	Fidesz-KDNP National List, no. 19
118	Katalin Novák	Fidesz	6 September 1977	–	Fidesz-KDNP National List, no. 4
119	Tibor Nunkovics from 8 July 2019	Jobbik	8 May 1984	–	Jobbik National List, no. 48
120	Zsolt Nyitrai	Fidesz	12 April 1977	Heves County 1.vk.	–
121	Lajos Oláh	DK	17 June 1969	Budapest 5.vk.	–
122	Viktor Orbán	Fidesz	31 May 1963	–	Fidesz-KDNP National List, no. 1
123	Péter Ovádi	Fidesz	22 October 1981	Veszprém County 1.vk.	–
124	Károly Pánczél	Fidesz	3 April 1961	Pest County 11.vk.	–
125	Imre Pesti	Fidesz	16 September 1952	–	Fidesz-KDNP National List, no. 37
126	János Pócs	Fidesz	17 November 1963	Jász-Nagykun-Szolnok County 2.vk.	–
127	Tibor Pogácsás	Fidesz	4 April 1964	Pest County 10.vk.	–
128	László Pósán	Fidesz	20 September 1965	Hajdú-Bihar County 2.vk.	–
129	Árpád János Potápi	Fidesz	28 March 1967	Tolna County 2.vk.	–
130	Anita Potocska-Kőrösi from 18 May 2018	Jobbik	23 May 1981	–	Jobbik National List, no. 26
131	Bence Rétvári	KDNP	10 December 1979	Pest County 4.vk.	–
132	Máriusz Révész	Fidesz	31 May 1967	–	Fidesz-KDNP National List, no. 73
133	Lajos Rig	Jobbik	13 November 1974	–	Jobbik National List, no. 27
134	Imre Ritter	MNOÖ	5 August 1952	–	German Nationality List
135	Gábor Riz	Fidesz	5 March 1956	Borsod-Abaúj-Zemplén County 3.vk.	–
136	Antal Rogán	Fidesz	29 January 1972	–	Fidesz-KDNP National List, no. 26
137	László Salacz	Fidesz	21 May 1971	Bács-Kiskun County 1.vk.	–
138	Erzsébet Schmuck	LMP	19 February 1954	–	LMP National List, no. 4
139	László Sebián-Petrovszki from 2 December 2019	DK	15 September 1977	–	DK National List, no. 12
140	Gabriella Selmeczi	Fidesz	21 June 1965	–	Fidesz-KDNP National List, no. 66
141	Zsolt Semjén	KDNP	8 August 1962	–	Fidesz-KDNP National List, no. 2
142	Miklós Seszták	KDNP	31 October 1968	Szabolcs-Szatmár-Bereg County 3.vk.	–
143	István Simicskó	KDNP	29 November 1961	Budapest 2.vk.	–
144	Miklós Simon	Fidesz	20 January 1962	Szabolcs-Szatmár-Bereg County 6.vk.	–
145	Róbert Balázs Simon	Fidesz	9 April 1970	Győr-Moson-Sopron County 1.vk.	–
146	György Simonka	Fidesz	14 March 1974	Békés County 4.vk.	–
147	Tamás Sneider	Independent	11 June 1972	–	Jobbik National List, no. 7
148	Miklós Soltész	KDNP	23 July 1963	–	Fidesz-KDNP National List, no. 40
149	Ádám Steinmetz	Jobbik	11 August 1980	–	Jobbik National List, no. 4
150	János Stummer	Jobbik	22 October 1984	–	Jobbik National List, no. 25
151	János Süli	KDNP	26 January 1956	Tolna County 3.vk.	–
152	Sándor Szabó	MSZP	29 October 1975	Csongrád-Csanád County 1.vk.	–
153	Szabolcs Szabó	Independent	21 February 1979	Budapest 17.vk.	–
154	Tímea Szabó	P	18 January 1976	Budapest 10.vk.	–
155	Tünde Szabó	Fidesz	31 May 1974	Szabolcs-Szatmár-Bereg County 1.vk.	–
156	Zsolt Szabó	Fidesz	20 October 1963	Heves County 3.vk.	–
157	László Szakács from 2 December 2019	MSZP	7 December 1975	–	MSZP-P National List, no. 18
158	László Szászfalvi	KDNP	11 January 1961	Somogy County 2.vk.	–
159	Kristóf Szatmáry	Fidesz	10 June 1975	Budapest 13.vk.	–
160	Sándor Székely	Independent	18 July 1977	–	DK National List, no. 7
161	Bernadett Szél	Independent	9 March 1977	–	LMP National List, no. 1
162	Péter Szijjártó	Fidesz	30 October 1978	–	Fidesz-KDNP National List, no. 25
163	György Szilágyi	Jobbik	11 November 1966	–	Jobbik National List, no. 14
164	Lajos Szűcs	Fidesz	15 September 1964	Pest County 7.vk.	–
165	András Tállai	Fidesz	5 February 1959	Borsod-Abaúj-Zemplén County 7.vk.	–
166	Gergely Tapolczai	Fidesz	21 December 1975	–	Fidesz-KDNP National List, no. 32
167	László Tasó	Fidesz	14 January 1963	Hajdú-Bihar County 3.vk.	–
168	Zoltán Tessely	Fidesz	1967	Fejér County 3.vk.	–
169	István Tiba	Fidesz	6 May 1966	Hajdú-Bihar County 6.vk.	–
170	Attila Tilki	Fidesz	9 May 1967	Szabolcs-Szatmár-Bereg County 4.vk.	–
171	Bence Tordai	P	26 January 1981	–	MSZP-P National List, no. 11
172	Bertalan Tóth	MSZP	10 November 1975	–	MSZP-P National List, no. 5
173	Csaba Tóth	MSZP	22 April 1960	Budapest 8.vk.	–
174	Gábor Törő	Fidesz	7 March 1962	Fejér County 2.vk.	–
175	Béla Turi-Kovács	Fidesz	2 December 1935	–	Fidesz-KDNP National List, no. 14
176	Bence Tuzson	Fidesz	31 January 1972	Pest County 5.vk.	–
177	Péter Ungár	LMP	10 June 1991	–	LMP National List, no. 5
178	Zsolt V. Németh	Fidesz	12 July 1963	Vas County 3.vk.	–
179	Ágnes Vadai	DK	11 February 1974	–	DK National List, no. 3
180	Gábor Varga	Fidesz	8 January 1968	Fejér County 5.vk.	–
181	László Varga	MSZP	1 September 1979	–	MSZP-P National List, no. 13
182	Mihály Varga	Fidesz	26 January 1965	Budapest 4.vk.	–
183	Zoltán Varga from 17 February 2020	DK	10 October 1964	–	DK National List, no. 14
184	Andrea Varga-Damm	Independent	30 August 1966	–	Jobbik National List, no. 5
185	Tamás Vargha	Fidesz	2 February 1959	Fejér County 1.vk.	–
186	László Varju	DK	22 August 1961	Budapest 11.vk.	–
187	László Vécsey	Fidesz	1 September 1958	Pest County 6.vk.	–
188	Imre Vejkey	KDNP	15 January 1964	–	Fidesz-KDNP National List, no. 70
189	László Vigh	Fidesz	3 November 1961	Zala County 1.vk.	–
190	Győző Vinnai	Fidesz	17 December 1959	Szabolcs-Szatmár-Bereg County 2.vk.	–
191	Eszter Vitályos from 20 September 2021	Fidesz	23 February 1979	–	Fidesz-KDNP National List, no. 184
192	István Vitányi	Fidesz	18 December 1952	Hajdú-Bihar County 4.vk.	–
193	János Volner	Independent	28 September 1969	–	Jobbik National List, no. 2
194	Pál Völner	Fidesz	30 October 1962	Komárom-Esztergom County 2.vk.	–
195	Mihály Witzmann	Fidesz	2 June 1977	Somogy County 4.vk.	–
196	Gábor Zombor	Fidesz	12 March 1964	Bács-Kiskun County 2.vk.	–
197	Dániel Z. Kárpát	Jobbik	1 June 1979	–	Jobbik National List, no. 6
198	Barna Pál Zsigmond	Fidesz	22 June 1972	–	Fidesz-KDNP National List, no. 74
199	Róbert Zsigó	Fidesz	10 November 1967	Bács-Kiskun County 6.vk.	–
	Dávid Janiczak until 9 May 2018	Jobbik	4 March 1987	–	Jobbik National List, no. 10
	Gergely Karácsony until 28 May 2018	P	11 June 1975	–	MSZP-P National List, no. 1
	György Gémesi until 30 May 2018	LMP	3 January 1956	–	LMP National List, no. 3
	Zoltán Balog until 17 October 2018	Fidesz	7 January 1958	–	Fidesz-KDNP National List, no. 9
	Ferenc Hirt until 6 December 2018	Fidesz	29 September 1967	–	Fidesz-KDNP National List, no. 68
	Gábor Staudt until 31 January 2019	Jobbik	10 May 1983	–	Jobbik National List, no. 13
	István Szávay until 31 January 2019	Jobbik	8 March 1981	–	Jobbik National List, no. 17
	Enikő Hegedűs until 21 March 2019	Independent	1970	–	Jobbik National List, no. 16
	Márton Gyöngyösi until 25 June 2019	Jobbik	8 June 1977	–	Jobbik National List, no. 11
	Lajos Kepli until 25 June 2019	Jobbik	11 October 1978	–	Jobbik National List, no. 24
	Ádám Mirkóczki until 25 October 2019	Jobbik	23 June 1978	–	Jobbik National List, no. 8
	Tamás Pintér until 28 October 2019	Jobbik	22 May 1981	Fejér County 4.vk.	–
	Imre László until 29 October 2019	DK	13 November 1946	–	DK National List, no. 10
	József Tóbiás until 31 October 2019	MSZP	15 July 1970	–	MSZP-P National List, no. 7
	Zsolt Gréczy until 31 December 2019	DK	10 October 1964	–	DK National List, no. 8
	Ferenc Koncz until 10 July 2020	Fidesz	2 October 1959	Borsod-Abaúj-Zemplén County 6.vk.	–
	László L. Simon until 29 August 2021	Fidesz	28 March 1972	–	Fidesz-KDNP National List, no. 75

=== Nationality delegates ===
Every nationality which is recognized in Hungary can elect a delegate (if the quota for full representation was not achieved) who has no voting rights in the Assembly.

No.	Name	Party	Born	district	list
	Lyubomir Alexov	SZOÖ	26 December 1958	–	Serb Nationality List
	Félix Farkas	ORÖ	21 April 1960	–	Romani Nationality List
	Vera Giricz	ORuÖ	29 July 1946	–	Rusyn Nationality List
	Erika Kiss-Köles	OSZÖ	27 November 1961	–	Slovene Nationality List
	Traján Kreszta	MROÖ	10 October 1947	–	Romanian Nationality List
	Antal Paulik	CSSM	1 March 1963	–	Slovak Nationality List
	Ewa Rónay-Slaba	OLÖ		–	Polish Nationality List
	Szeván Serkisian	OÖÖ		–	Armenian Nationality List
	Tamás Sianos	MGOÖ	15 September 1942	–	Greek Nationality List
	József Szolga	OHÖ	29 August 1966	–	Croat Nationality List
	Brigitta Szuperák	UOÖ		–	Ukrainian Nationality List
	Szimeon Varga	BOÖ	20 October 1971	–	Bulgarian Nationality List
	Silva Simani until 7 June 2018	OÖÖ		–	Armenian Nationality List

== See also ==
- Fourth Orbán Government
- List of Hungarian people
