= Budapest 5th constituency =

Hungarian legislative district

Budapest 5th constituency (District VII.)
- Constituency for the National Assembly
- Location of Budapest 05 within Budapest

- Location of Budapest within Hungary
- City: Budapest
- Electorate: 65,297 (2018)
- Major settlements: 7th District

Current constituency
- Created: 2011
- Party: Tisza Party
- Member: István Weigand
- Created from: Constituency no. 8; Constituency no. 9
- Elected: 2026

The 5th constituency of Budapest (Hungarian: Budapesti 05. számú országgyűlési egyéni választókerület) is one of the single-member constituencies of the National Assembly, the national legislature of Hungary. The constituency standard abbreviation: Budapest 05. OEVK.

Since 2026, it has been represented by István Weigand of the Tisza Party.

== Geography ==
The 5th constituency is located in the central-western part of Pest.

The constituency borders the Budapest 7th constituency to the north, the Budapest 8th constituency to the east, the Budapest 6th constituency to the south and the Budapest 1st constituency to the west.

=== List of districts ===
The constituency includes the following municipalities:

1. District VI.: Full part of the district.
2. District VII.: Full part of the district.

== History ==
The current 5th constituency of Budapest was created in 2011 and contains the pre-2011 8th and 9th constituencies of Budapest. Its borders have not changed since its creation.

== Members ==
The constituency was first represented by Lajos Oláh of Independent (with Unity support) from 2014, and he was re-elected of the DK in 2018 and 2022 (with United for Hungary support). In the 2026 election, István Weigand of the Tisza Party was elected representative.

Election	Member	Party	%
2014	Lajos Oláh	Independent (Note: Oláh is a member of DK, but formally, he was an independent MP, because the DK did not form an own parliamentary group. In 2014 parliamentary election Oláh ran as a joint candidate of the Unity electoral alliance.)	38.7
2018	Lajos Oláh	DK	45.9
2022	Lajos Oláh	DK	51.4
2026	István Weigand	TISZA	68.6

== Election result ==
=== 2026 election ===
Result 2026
1. István Weigand, Tisza (68.6%)
2. Balázs Norbert Kovács, Fidesz–KDNP (23.7%)
3. Beáta Edőcs, Our Homeland Movement (3.77%)
4. Dorottya Keszthelyi, Democratic Coalition (2.54%)
5. János Oláh, Hungarian Two-Tailed Dog Party (1.36%)

2026 parliamentary election: Budapest - 5th constituency
Party	Candidate	Votes	%	±%
Tisza	István Weigand	42,668	68.59	New
Fidesz–KDNP	Balázs Norbert Kovács	14,769	23.74	−14.03
Mi Hazánk	Beáta Edőcs	2,344	3.77	+0.10
DK	Dorottya Keszthelyi	1,578	2.54	−48.85
MKKP	János Oláh	845	1.36	−4.21
Majority		27,899	44,85	▲31.25
Turnout		62,553	81.27	▲12.55
Registered electors		76,968		

=== 2022 election ===
Result 2022
1. Dr. Lajos Oláh, United for Hungary (51.4%)
2. Balázs Norbert Kovács, Fidesz–KDNP (37.8%)
3. Roland Terdik, MKKP (5.60%)
4. Dr. Gyula Popély, Our Homeland (3.60%)
5. Gergely Róbert Major, MEMO (1.60%)

2022 parliamentary election: Budapest - 5th constituency
Party	Candidate	Votes	%	±%
United for Hungary	Dr. Lajos Oláh	20,561	51.39	
Fidesz–KDNP	Balázs Norbert Kovács	15,119	37.79	+0.65
MKKP	Roland Terdik	2,228	5.57	+2.42
Mi Hazánk	Dr. Gyula Popély	1,467	3.67	New
MEMO	Gergely Róbert Major	638	1.59	New
Majority		5,442	13.6	
Turnout		40,486	68.72	▼0.81
Registered electors		58,914		
United for Hungary hold		Swing	+4.9	

=== 2018 election ===
Result 2018
1. Dr. Lajos Oláh, DK (45.9%)
2. István Bajkai, Fidesz–KDNP (37.1%)
3. János Stummer, Jobbik (7.10%)
4. László Moldován, LMP (6.80%)
5. Zsuzsanna Döme, MKKP (3.10%)

2018 parliamentary election: Budapest - 5th constituency
Party	Candidate	Votes	%	±%
DK	Dr. Lajos Oláh	20,598	45.85	as Unity
Fidesz–KDNP	Dr. István Bajkai	16,687	37.14	−0.89
Jobbik	János Stummer	3,171	7.06	−3.39
LMP	László Moldován	3,055	6.8	−5.19
MKKP	Zsuzsanna Döme	1,414	3.15	New
Majority		3,911	8.71	
Turnout		45,399	69.53	▲6.31
Registered electors		65,297		
DK hold		Swing	+8.1	

=== 2014 election ===
Result 2014
1. Dr. Lajos Oláh, Unity (38.7%)
2. Monika Mária Rónaszéki-Keresztes, Fidesz–KDNP (38.1%)
3. Katalin Gyöngyvér Csiba, LMP (12.0%)
4. János Stummer, Jobbik (10.4%)
5. Tibor László Varga, JESZ (0.80%)

2014 parliamentary election: Budapest - 5th constituency
Party	Candidate	Votes	%	±%
Unity	Dr. Lajos Oláh	17,256	38.68	
Fidesz–KDNP	Monika Mária Rónaszéki-Keresztes	16,983	38.06	
LMP	Katalin Gyöngyvér Csiba	5,348	11.99	
Jobbik	János Stummer	4,661	10.45	
JESZ	Tibor László Varga	369	0.83	
Majority		273	0.6	
Turnout		45,182	63.22	
Registered electors		71,463		
Unity win (new seat)				
