= Balázs Trentin =

Hungarian politician

Member of the National Assembly
- Assuming office 9 May 2026
- Succeeding: Dezső Hiszékeny
- Constituency: Budapest 7th

Personal details
- Party: Tisza

Balázs Trentin is a Hungarian politician who was elected member of the National Assembly in 2026 representing the Budapest 7th constituency. He previously worked as an economist.
