= Szabolcs-Szatmár-Bereg County 2nd constituency =

Hungarian national legislative constituency

Szabolcs-Szatmár-Bereg County 2nd constituency (Nyíregyháza)
- Constituency for the National Assembly
- Location of Szabolcs-Szatmár-Bereg county 02 within Szabolcs-Szatmár-Bereg county

- Location of Szabolcs-Szatmár-Bereg county within Hungary
- County: Szabolcs-Szatmár-Bereg
- Electorate: 71,657 (2018)
- Major settlements: Nyíregyháza

Current constituency
- Created: 2011
- Party: Tisza Party
- Member: Péter Lajos Szakács
- Elected: 2026

The 2nd constituency of Szabolcs-Szatmár-Bereg County (Hungarian: Szabolcs-Szatmár-Bereg megyei 02. számú országgyűlési egyéni választókerület) is one of the single member constituencies of the National Assembly, the national legislature of Hungary. The constituency standard abbreviation: Szabolcs-Szatmár-Bereg 02. OEVK.

Since 2026, it has been represented by Péter Lajos Szakács of the Tisza Party.

== Geography ==
The 2nd constituency is located in western part of Szabolcs-Szatmár-Bereg County.

=== List of municipalities ===
The constituency includes the following municipalities:

1. Balsa
2. Buj
3. Gávavencsellő
4. Ibrány
5. Kálmánháza
6. Kótaj
7. Nagycserkesz
8. Nyíregyháza: Western part of the city.
9. Nyírtelek
10. Paszab
11. Rakamaz
12. Szabolcs
13. Szorgalmatos
14. Timár
15. Tiszabercel
16. Tiszadada
17. Tiszadob
18. Tiszaeszlár
19. Tiszalök
20. Tiszanagyfalu
21. Tiszavasvári

== Members ==
The constituency was first represented by Győző Vinnai of the Fidesz from 2014, and he was re-elected in 2018. In the 2026 election, Péter Lajos Szakács of the Tisza Party was elected representative.

Election	Member	Party	%
2014	Győző Vinnai	Fidesz	
2018	Győző Vinnai	Fidesz	
2022	Győző Vinnai	Fidesz	58.1
2026	Péter Lajos Szakács	TISZA	53.17
