= István Weigand =

Hungarian politician

Member of the National Assembly
- Incumbent
- Assumed office 9 May 2026
- Preceded by: Lajos Oláh
- Constituency: Budapest 5th

Personal details
- Party: TISZA

István Weigand is a Hungarian politician who was elected member of the National Assembly in 2026. He previously worked for the Border Guard, as a police officer for the Rendőrség, and as a self-employed carpenter.
