= Alsóbogát =

- Village
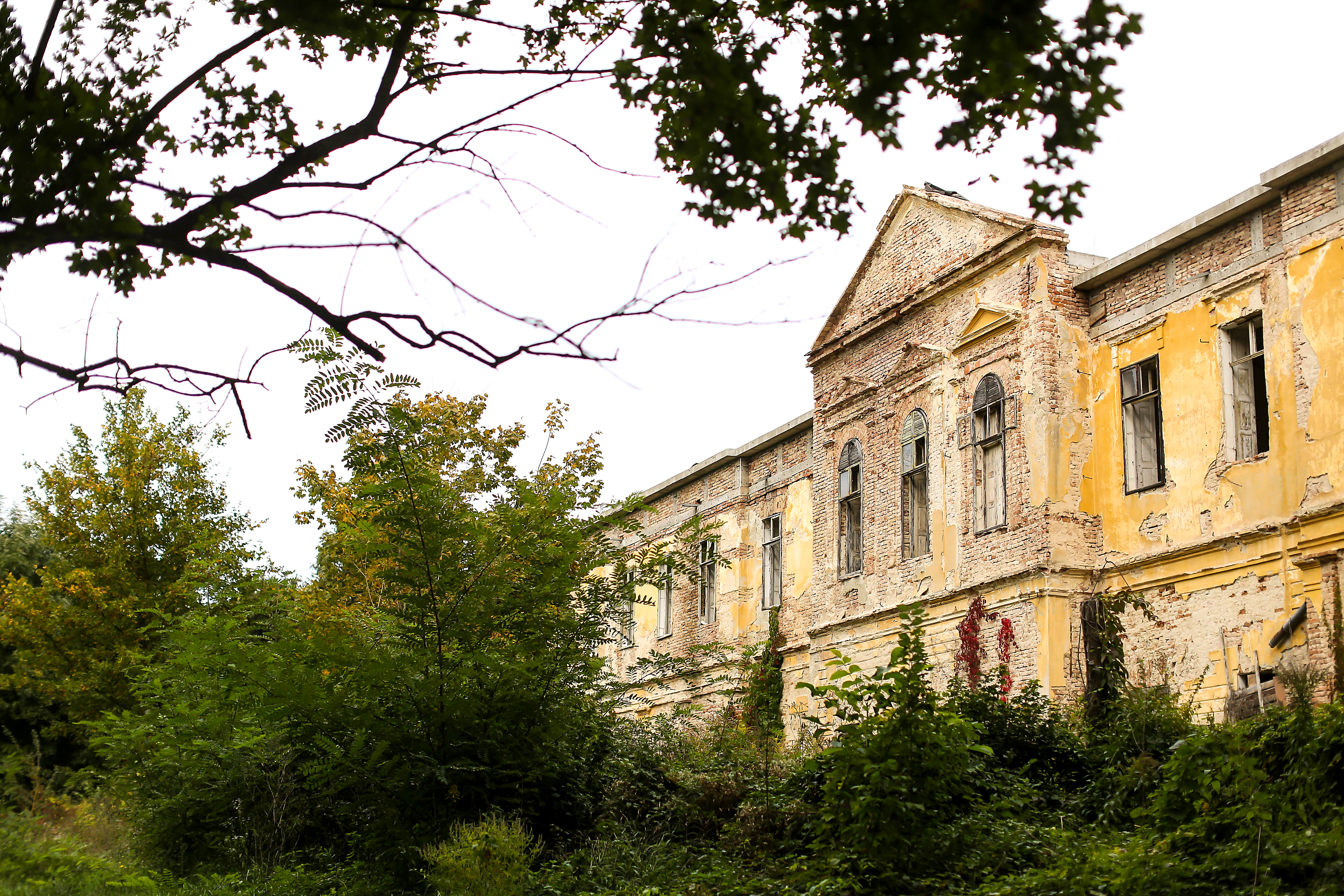
- Festetics Mansion in Alsóbogát

- Coat of arms

- Location of Alsóbogát
- Coordinates: 46.51079°N 17.74966°E
- Country: Hungary
- Region: Southern Transdanubia
- County: Somogy
- District: Kaposvár
- RC Diocese: Kaposvár

Area
  - Total: 12.01 km^{2} (4.64 sq mi)

Population (2017)
  - Total: 231
  - Density: 19.2/km^{2} (49.8/sq mi)
- Demonyms: bogáti, alsóbogáti
- Time zone: UTC+1 (CET)
  - Summer (DST): UTC+2 (CEST)
- Postal code: 7443
- Area code: (+36) 82
- NUTS 3 code: HU232
- MP: József Attila Móring (KDNP)
- Website: Alsóbogát Online

Alsóbogát is a village in Somogy county, Hungary.
