= Budapest 1st constituency =

Hungarian legislative district

Coordinates: 47°30′N 19°03′E

Budapest 1st constituency (District V.)
- Constituency for the National Assembly
- Location of Budapest 01 within Budapest

- Location of Budapest within Hungary
- City: Budapest
- Electorate: 63,531 (2018)
- Major settlements: 5th District

Current constituency
- Created: 2011
- Party: Tisza Party
- Member: Zoltán Tanács
- Created from: Constituency no. 1; Constituency no. 7; Constituency no. 10; Constituency no. 12
- Elected: 2026

The 1st constituency of Budapest (Hungarian: Budapesti 01. számú országgyűlési egyéni választókerület) is one of the single-member constituencies of the National Assembly, the national legislature of Hungary. The constituency standard abbreviation: Budapest 01. OEVK.

Since 2026, it has been represented by Zoltán Tanács of the Tisza Party.

== Geography ==
The 1st constituency is located in the central part of Budapest.

The constituency borders the 7th constituency to the north, 5th and 6th constituency to the east, 2nd and 3rd constituency to the west.

=== List of districts ===
The constituency includes the following municipalities:

1. District I.: Full part of the district.
2. District V.: Full part of the district.
3. District VIII.: Inner part (Palotanegyed) of the district.
4. District IX.: Inner part (Belső-Ferencváros) of the district.

== History ==
The current 1st constituency of Budapest was created in 2011 and contains parts of the pre-2011 1st, 7th, 10th, and 12th constituencies of Budapest. Its borders have not changed since its creation.

== Members ==
The constituency was first represented by Antal Rogán of the Fidesz from 2014 to 2018. Antal Csárdi of the LMP was elected in 2018 and re-elected in 2022 (with United for Hungary support). In the 2026 election, Zoltán Tanács of the Tisza Party was elected representative.

Election	Member	Party	%	Ref.
2014	Antal Rogán	Fidesz	45.29	
2018	Antal Csárdi	LMP	48.73	
2022 (Note: Csárdi was a member of LMP. He ran as a joint candidate of the United for Hungary electoral alliance during the 2022 parliamentary election.)	Antal Csárdi	LMP	48.47	
2026	Zoltán Tanács	TISZA	62.52	

== Election result ==
=== 2026 election ===
Result 2026
1. Zoltán Tanács, Tisza Party (63.0%)
2. Csilla Fazekas, Fidesz–KDNP (30.7%)
3. Attila Nagy, Our Homeland (3.25%)
4. István Szintay, MKKP (1.63%)
5. Marietta Herfort, DK (1.28%)
6. Other parties (less than 1%) (0.11%)

2026 parliamentary election: Budapest - 1st constituency
Party	Candidate	Votes	%	±%
Tisza	Zoltán Tanács	37,803	63.05	New
Fidesz–KDNP	Csilla Fazekas	18,391	30.67	−11.48
Mi Hazánk	Attila Nagy	1,948	3.25	+0.51
MKKP	István Szintay	978	1.63	−2.77
DK	Marietta Herfort	770	1.28	New
Szolidaritás	Zoltán Várkonyi	66	0.11	
Majority		19,412	32.38	+26.51
Turnout		60,313	81.60	▲6.04
Registered electors		73,914		
Tisza gain from United for Hungary		Swing		

=== 2022 election ===
Result 2022
1. Antal Csárdi, United for Hungary (48.5%)
2. László Böröcz, Fidesz–KDNP (42.6%)
3. Antal Hotz, MKKP (4.40%)
4. István Szikora, Our Homeland (2.70%)
5. Gergely Murányi, MEMO (1.20%)

2022 parliamentary election: Budapest - 1st constituency
Party	Candidate	Votes	%	±%
United for Hungary	Antal Csárdi	21,778	48.47	
Fidesz–KDNP	László Böröcz	19,144	42.6	+0.79
MKKP	Antal Hotz	1,975	4.4	+1.32
Mi Hazánk	István Szikora	1,229	2.74	New
MEMO	Gergely Murányi	543	1.21	New
NÉP	Larion Swierkiewicz	186	0.41	New
Leftist Alliance	György Simon	79	0.18	
Majority		2,634	5.87	
Turnout		45,391	75.96	▼0.72
Registered electors		59,754		
United for Hungary hold		Swing	-1.0	

=== 2018 election ===
Result 2018
1. Antal Csárdi, LMP (48.7%)
2. István Hollik, Fidesz–KDNP (41.8%)
3. Pál Losonczy, Jobbik (6.40%)
4. András Horváth, MKKP (3.10%)

2018 parliamentary election: Budapest - 1st constituency
Party	Candidate	Votes	%	±%
LMP	Antal Csárdi	23,345	48.73	+35.08
Fidesz–KDNP	István Hollik	20,031	41.81	−3.48
Jobbik	Pál Losonczy	3,060	6.39	−1.45
MKKP	András Horváth	1,474	3.08	New
Majority		3,314	6.92	
Turnout		48,714	76.68	▲5.16
Registered electors		63,531		
LMP gain from Fidesz–KDNP		Swing	-5.8	

=== 2014 election ===
Result 2014
1. Antal Rogán, Fidesz–KDNP (45.3%)
2. Szabolcs Kerék-Bárczy, Unity (32.6%)
3. András Schiffer, LMP (13.6%)
4. Lóránt Gézáné Hegedűs, Jobbik (7.80%)
5. Istvánné Szőlősi, Soc Dems (0.70%)

2014 parliamentary election: Budapest - 1st constituency
Party	Candidate	Votes	%	±%
Fidesz–KDNP	Antal Rogán	21,503	45.29	
Unity	Szabolcs Kerék-Bárczy	15,459	32.56	
LMP	András Schiffer	6,482	13.65	
Jobbik	Lóránt Gézáné Hegedűs	3,713	7.82	
Soc Dems	Istvánné Szőlősi	321	0.68	
Majority		6,044	12.73	
Turnout		48,056	71.52	
Registered electors		67,192		
Fidesz–KDNP win (new seat)				
