= Borsod-Abaúj-Zemplén County 2nd constituency =

Hungarian national legislative constituency

Borsod-Abaúj-Zemplén County 2nd constituency (Miskolc)
- Constituency for the National Assembly
- Location of Borsod-Abaúj-Zemplén county 02 within Borsod-Abaúj-Zemplén county

- Location of Borsod-Abaúj-Zemplén county within Hungary
- County: Borsod-Abaúj-Zemplén
- Electorate: 71,302 (2022)
- Major settlements: Miskolc

Current constituency
- Created: 2011
- Party: Tisza Party
- Member: András Czipa
- Elected: 2026

The 2nd constituency of Borsod-Abaúj-Zemplén County (Hungarian: Borsod-Abaúj-Zemplén megyei 02. számú országgyűlési egyéni választókerület) is one of the single member constituencies of the National Assembly, the national legislature of Hungary. The constituency standard abbreviation: Borsod-Abaúj-Zemplén 02. OEVK.

Since 2026, it has been represented by András Czipa of the Tisza Party.

== Geography ==
The 2nd constituency is located in western part of Borsod-Abaúj-Zemplén County.

=== List of municipalities ===
The constituency includes the following municipalities:

1. Miskolc: Western part of the city.
2. Parasznya
3. Radostyán
4. Sajóbábony
5. Sajólászlófalva
6. Varbó

== Members ==
The constituency was first represented by László Varga of MSZP (with Unity support) from 2014 to 2018. In the 2018 election György Hubay of the Fidesz was elected representative. He was succeeded by János Kiss of the Fidesz in 2022. In the 2026 election, András Czipa of the Tisza Party was elected representative.

Election	Member	Party	%	Ref.
2014 (Note: Varga was a member of MSZP, he ran as a joint candidate of the Unity electoral alliance during the 2014 parliamentary election.)	László Varga	MSZP	31.39	
2018	György Hubay	Fidesz	38.06	
2022	János Kiss	Fidesz	43.85	
2026	András Czipa	Tisza Party	60.31	
