= Zoltán Tanács =

Hungarian politician (born 1975)

Minister of Science and Technology
- Incumbent
- Assumed office 13 May 2026
- Prime Minister: Péter Magyar
- Preceded by: László Palkovics (2022; as Minister of Technology and Industry)

Member of the National Assembly
- Incumbent
- Assumed office 9 May 2026
- Preceded by: Antal Csárdi
- Constituency: Budapest 1st

Personal details
- Born: 1975 (age 50–51)
- Party: TISZA

Zoltán Tanács (born 1975) is a Hungarian politician who was elected member of the National Assembly in 2026. He is the policy director of the Tisza Party.
