= István Balajti =

Hungarian politician

Member of the National Assembly
- Incumbent
- Assumed office 9 May 2026
- Preceded by: Zoltán Bóna
- Constituency: Pest 8th

Personal details
- Party: Tisza

István Balajti is a Hungarian politician who was elected member of the National Assembly in 2026 representing the Pest County 8th constituency. He previously worked as a mechanical engineer.
