= Péter Lajos Szakács =

Hungarian politician

Member of the National Assembly
- Incumbent
- Assumed office 9 May 2026
- Preceded by: Győző Vinnai
- Constituency: Szabolcs-Szatmár-Bereg 2nd

Personal details
- Born: 1975 or 1976 (age 49–50)
- Party: Tisza

Péter Lajos Szakács (born 1975 or 1976) is a Hungarian politician who was elected member of the National Assembly in 2026 representing the Szabolcs-Szatmár-Bereg County 2nd constituency. He previously worked as a company manager.
