= József Jelencsik =

Hungarian politician

Member of the National Assembly
- Incumbent
- Assumed office 9 May 2026
- Preceded by: András Aradszki
- Constituency: Pest 1st

Personal details
- Party: TISZA

József Jelencsik is a Hungarian politician who was elected member of the National Assembly in 2026. He previously served as an assistant to the National Assembly from 2010 to 2014 and from 2019 to 2022, and as an advisor in the European Parliament from 2014 to 2019.
