= Péter Szalay (politician) =

Hungarian politician

Member of the National Assembly
- In office 14 February 2011 – 5 May 2014

Personal details
- Born: June 29, 1940 (age 85) Budapest, Hungary
- Party: Fidesz (since 1993)
- Profession: physician

Dr. Péter Szalay (born June 29, 1940) is a Hungarian physician, member of the National Assembly (MP) from Fidesz Budapest Regional List between 2011 and 2014.

Szalay became MP on February 14, 2011, replacing István Tarlós, who was elected Mayor of Budapest on December 3, 2010. Szalay was appointed a member of the Committee on European Affairs on February 14, 2011, and Committee on Health on February 11, 2013. He was defeated by Dezső Hiszékeny (MSZP) at Budapest Constituency VII in the 2014 parliamentary election.
