= Ildikó Bangó-Borbély =

Hungarian politician

Ildikó Bangóné Borbély (born 29 March 1972) is a Hungarian politician. She currently serves as a member of National Assembly of Hungary (Országgyűlés). She had earlier served as Member of Parliament for the Hungarian Socialist Party in 2014.

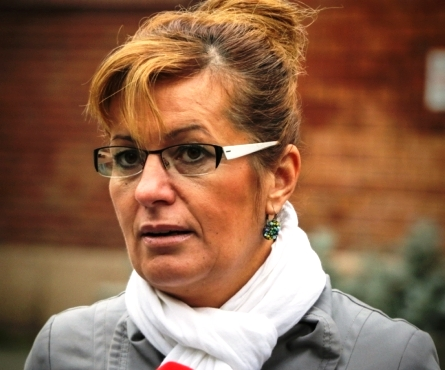

== See also ==
- List of members of the National Assembly of Hungary (2018–2022)
