= Nyíregyháza Zoo =

Coordinates: 47°59′58″N 21°43′30″E

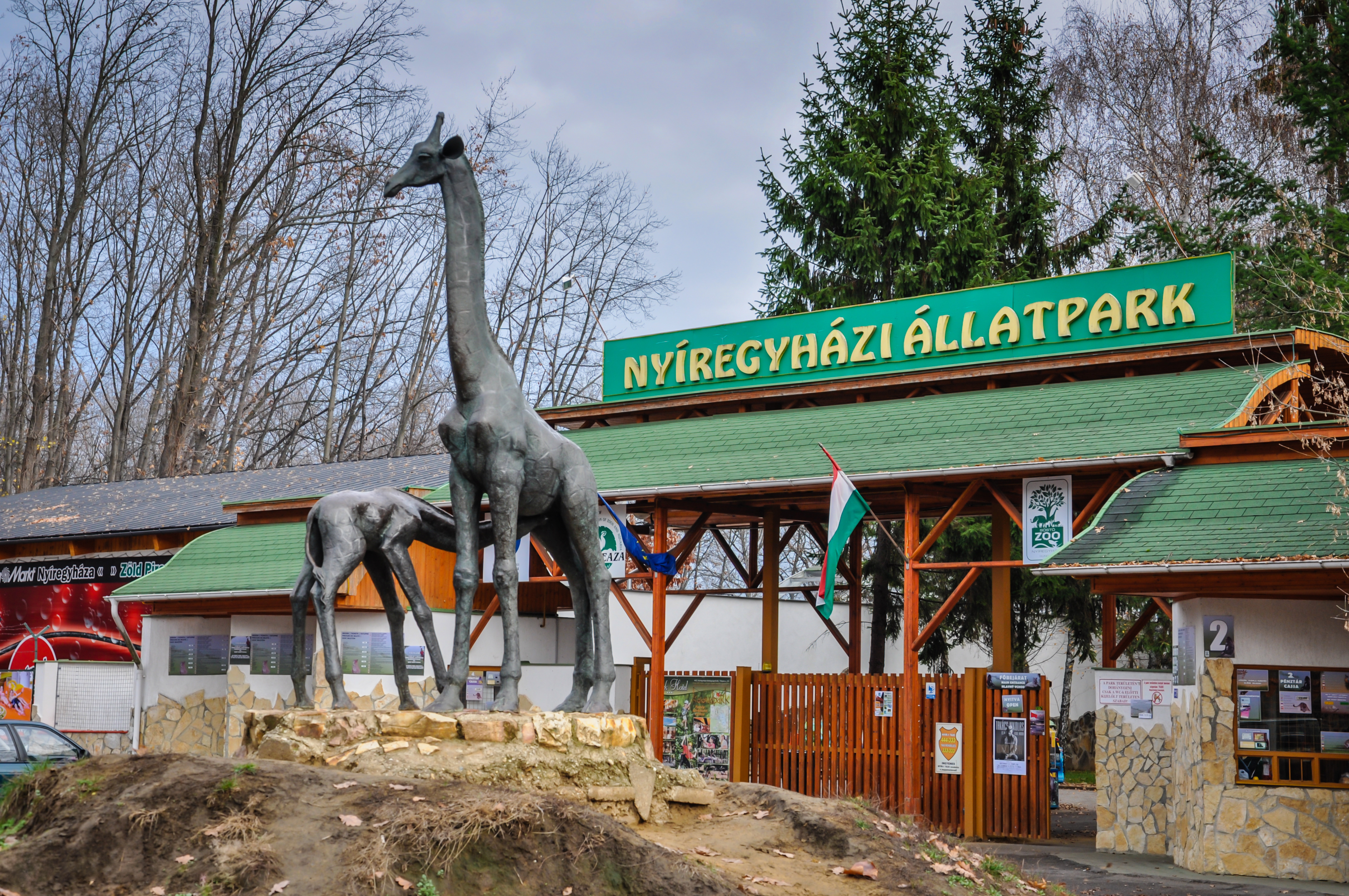
- A giraffe statue stands between the entrance and the main road
- Interactive map of Nyíregyháza Zoo
- Date opened: 1974
- Location: Nyíregyháza, Hungary
- Land area: 30 hectares (74 acres)

The Nyíregyházi Zoo (Hungarian: Nyíregyházi Állatpark, lit. 'Animal Park of Nyíregyháza'), also known as Sóstó Zoo, is a 30-hectare zoo located 5km (3.3 miles) north of Nyíregyháza, Hungary. The zoo is in the Sóstó recreation area, which includes a beach, spa, public swimming pool, open-air museum, and a forested oak tree park and accommodations for visitors.

== History ==
Nyíregyháza Zoo was opened in 1974 as “Nyíregyházi Vadaspark” (Wild Park of Nyíregyháza). It was built 5 kilometers from Nyíregyháza in the Sóstó recreation area of Hungary. Owned and sponsored by the local government, Nyíregyháza Zoo is governed by the city area of Sóstó-Nyíregyháza.

Upon first opening for visitors in 1974, its main purpose was to exhibit native species of Hungary and the Pannonian Basin. It has a unique exhibition system in which the giant exhibits are separated from the paths with ditches filled with water. Some European species were replaced with their close relatives; for instance, American bison were exhibited instead of those found in Europe. The greatest spectacles in the zoo's early years were the European carnivores, such as bears and timber wolves.

In 1996, the new director László Gajdos took up his duties in the park and decided to expand the Zoo in Nyíregyháza. János Szánthó became deputy manager, personally bringing several smaller animals to the zoo.

In 2022, it was renamed "Nyíregyházi Állatpark" (Nyíregyházi Zoo). As of August 2022, the zoo is the richest in mammals (especially primates and pachyderms) of all zoos in Hungary. The once 14-hectare area has expanded to 30 hectares and is home to 500 species and more than 5000 animals. The zoo is a member of the Hungarian Association of Zoos (MÁSZ), the European Association of Zoos and Aquaria (EAZA), and the World Association of Zoos and Aquariums (WAZA).

== Timeline ==
- 1996: The lion exhibit was completed, and the country's biggest exhibit, 'Afrika Panoráma' (Africa Panorama), opened, where zebras, ostriches, common elands, and wildebeests cohabited this exhibit. The aviary, home to the richest parrot and cockatoo collection in Hungary as of August 2022, was also completed.
- 1997: The expansion of the zoo continued. The llama and kangaroo exhibit opened to the public, and the construction of the giraffe shelter finished.
- 1998: More species were brought into the zoo. Uniquely in Hungary, the parrots laid eggs throughout the year, and several scarce antelope calves were born (including waterbucks and black wildebeests). New species arrived at the zoo, including skunks and red kangaroos from Budapest.
- 1999: The zoo became the first provincial zoo to feature a seal exhibit, where visitors could watch the calves swim. Construction of the rhinoceros shelter also began that year.
- 2000: Hungary's first saltwater aquarium in the countryside opened. Among many other animals, it included a requiem shark.
- 2001: The exhibit and aviary for European animals were rebuilt and named Magyar Őspark (Hungarian Primeval Park). Additionally, a small open-air museum was constructed. Additions in this year included the long-awaited European bison.
- 2002: The 'Tropical House' opened. Some sharks and monkeys were moved to the newly built house, and the collection was expanded with new species, most notably the critically endangered Bornean orangutan. The outdoor portion of the house, home to the 'Monkey Forest' and the 'Mediterranean Garden' also opened the same year.
- 2003: Around the former seal exhibit, the 'Polar Panorama' was built. Here, Penguins and polar bears were exhibited for the first time in provincial Hungary.
- 2004: The educational hall was built but has since been closed. A wax museum presenting human evolution also opened that year. The sensation of the year was the arrival of a white tiger.
- 2005: The first pachyderm, a young white male rhinoceros, arrived. The Siberian tigers and Kamchatka brown bears received larger exhibits.
- 2006: A new lion exhibit was built, and the pygmy hippopotamus and elephant houses were finished. Two white rhinoceroses, one pygmy hippopotamus, three African elephants, and two Indian rhinos were brought to the zoo. Hungary's first in-zoo hotel, Hotel Dzsungel (Hotel Jungle), also finished construction.
- 2007: An exhibit was built for the zoo's California sea lions. The birth of the first Hungarian-born African elephant calf, named Jumanee, occurred this year.
- 2008: The Dél-Amerika Ház (South America House) opened to the public, including a tapir. Additionally, dromedaries, moose, and Grévy's zebras were introduced to other parts of the zoo.
- 2009: New spectacled bears, sun bears, three Indian elephants and a white lion were brought to the zoo. A large expansion project began, The Zöld Piramis (Green Pyramid), containing several Asian species, 'Tarzan's Path' (consisting of African species), the 'Indonesian Oceanarium' and the 'Rainforest House' all began construction.
- 2010: The project from 2009 opened to the public. Komodo dragons, pufferfish, triggerfish, several species of sharks (including reef sharks and grey nurse sharks, also known as sand tiger sharks), a six-member orangutan family, and a siamang arrived. Marmosets (now numbering 18), the first West African dwarf goat kids, a dromedary, and several tortoises were born during this year.
