= Márta Mátrai =

Hungarian jurist and politician

Márta Mátrai MP
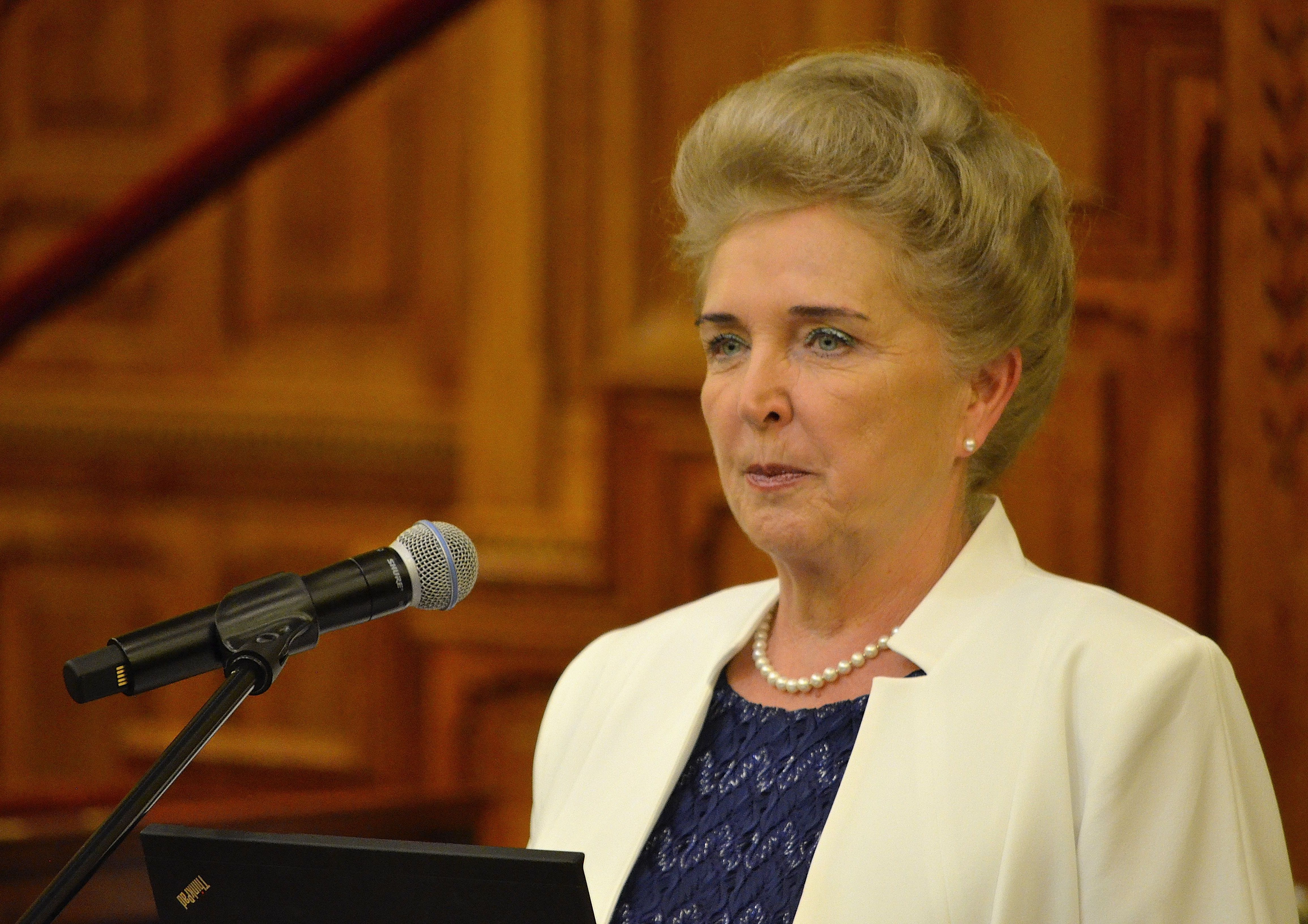
- Mátrai in 2015

First Officer of the National Assembly
- In office 1 January 2013 – 8 May 2026
- Preceded by: position re-established
- Succeeded by: vacant

Member of the National Assembly
- In office 18 June 1998 – 8 May 2026

Personal details
- Born: 22 February 1948 (age 78) Szombathely, Hungary
- Party: Fidesz (1993–present)
- Children: 1
- Education: University of Pécs
- Profession: Jurist, politician

Márta Mátrai (born 22 February 1948) is a Hungarian jurist and politician who served as member of the National Assembly (MP) from the Somogy County Regional List of Fidesz from 1998 to 2026. She was elected First Officer of the National Assembly in 2013, a position which was re-established after 64 years of vacancy.

== Political career ==
She was the founder of the Kaposvár branch of Fidesz in 1989 and 1990. As an individual candidate in the September–October 1990 local elections, she was elected to the General Assembly of Szombathely of which she was a member until October 1998. She was a legal councillor from 1994 to 1998. Following the abolishment of the age limit she joined Fidesz and was the head of the city branch from 1994. She has been on the County and National Board since 1995. After the transformation into a people's party in 2003, she was awarded the chairmanship of the Kaposvár constituency.

She ran in the 1994 parliamentary election. She secured her seat in Parliament in the 1998 parliamentary election from the Somogy County Regional List of Fidesz. She was deputy parliamentary group leader and parliamentary group executive of Fidesz from June 1998 until the end of the term. She was active in the Committee on Constitution and Judicial Affairs and in the Defence Committee, the latter of which she was deputy chair of. In the 2002 parliamentary election she became MP from the Somogy County Regional List. She became a member of the Committee on Constitution and Judicial Affairs again and chair of the Committee on Social and Family Affairs. She has been deputy parliamentary faction leader again since 15 May 2002. In the general election held in 2006, she was elected from the Somogy County Regional List. She was a member of the Constitutional, Judicial and Standing Orders Committee from 1998 to 2014. She became a member of the Legislative Committee in May 2014.

== Personal life ==
She is divorced and has a son, Tamás.

Political offices
| Preceded by Post abolished 1949–2013; Title last held by Jolán Mónus | First Officer of the National Assembly; 2013–2026 | Succeeded by Vacant |
