= András Czipa =

Hungarian politician

Member of the National Assembly
- Assuming office 9 May 2026
- Succeeding: János Kiss
- Constituency: Borsod-Abaúj-Zemplén 2nd

Personal details
- Party: TISZA

András Czipa is a Hungarian politician who was elected member of the National Assembly in 2026. He previously served as assistant to Gabriella Gerzsenyi in the European Parliament.
