= László Gajdos =

Hungarian politician (born 1962)

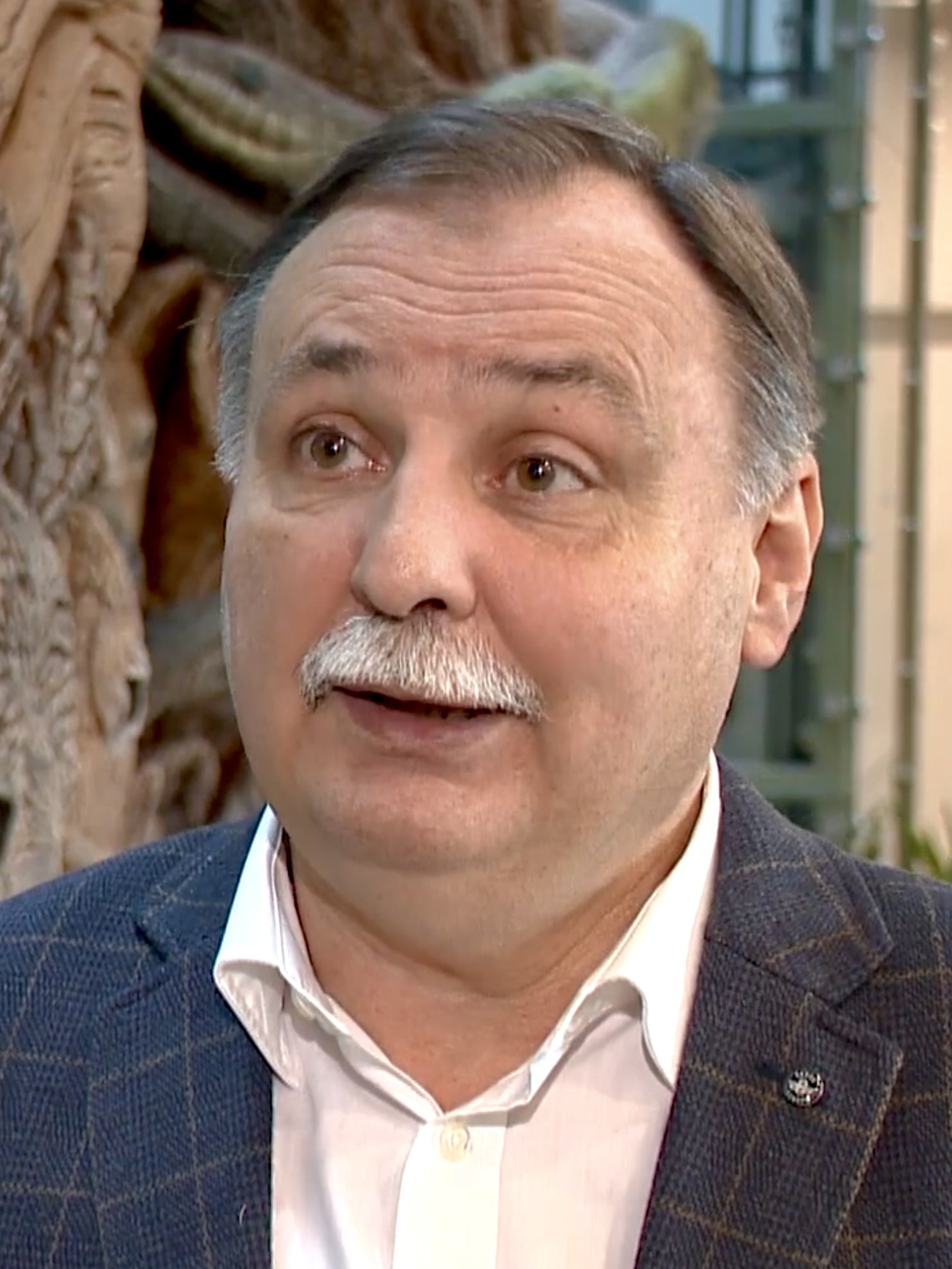
- Gajdos in 2024

Minister of the Living Environment
- Incumbent
- Assumed office 13 May 2026
- Prime Minister: Péter Magyar
- Preceded by: Imre Szabó (2010; as Minister of Environment and Water)

Member of the National Assembly
- Incumbent
- Assumed office 9 May 2026
- Preceded by: Tünde Szabó
- Constituency: Szabolcs-Szatmár-Bereg 1st

Personal details
- Born: László Attila Gajdos Nyíregyháza, Hungary
- Party: TISZA

László Attila Gajdos is a Hungarian politician who was elected member of the National Assembly in 2026. He has served as director of the Nyíregyháza Zoo from 1996 until his election to the National Assembly in the 2026 parliamentary election. Since May 13th 2026, he has been serving as Minister of the Living Environment.
