= List of first officers of the National Assembly (Hungary) =

The first officer of the National Assembly of Hungary (Hungarian: Magyar Országgyűlés háznagya) is the deputy of the Speaker of the National Assembly of Hungary. The latest First Officer was Márta Mátrai, who concluded her term on 9 May 2026. Since then, the office is vacant.

== First officers of the National Assembly of Hungary ==
Name	Entered office	Left office	Political Party
National Assembly
Aladár Lukovich	18 February 1920	1922	
Jenő Karafiáth	1922	28 January 1927	EP
House of Magnates
Endre Rakovszky	1927	1939	Independent
Lajos Szapáry	1939	1944	Independent
Aladár Krüger	1944	1945	NYKP
House of Representatives
Jenő Karafiáth	1927	1931	EP
Móric Putnoky	1931	1944	EP
János Halmay	1944	1945	NYKP
National Assembly
István Vásáry	1945	1946	FKGP
László Révész	1946	1947	FKGP
Ferenc Szeder	1947	1948	MSZDP
Illésné Mónus	1948	1949	MSZDP

=== Since 2013 ===
Name	Entered office	Left office	Political Party
A Magyar Országgyűlés háznagya
Márta Mátrai	2013	8 May 2026	Fidesz
