= Szabolcs Kerék-Bárczy =

Hungarian politician and economist

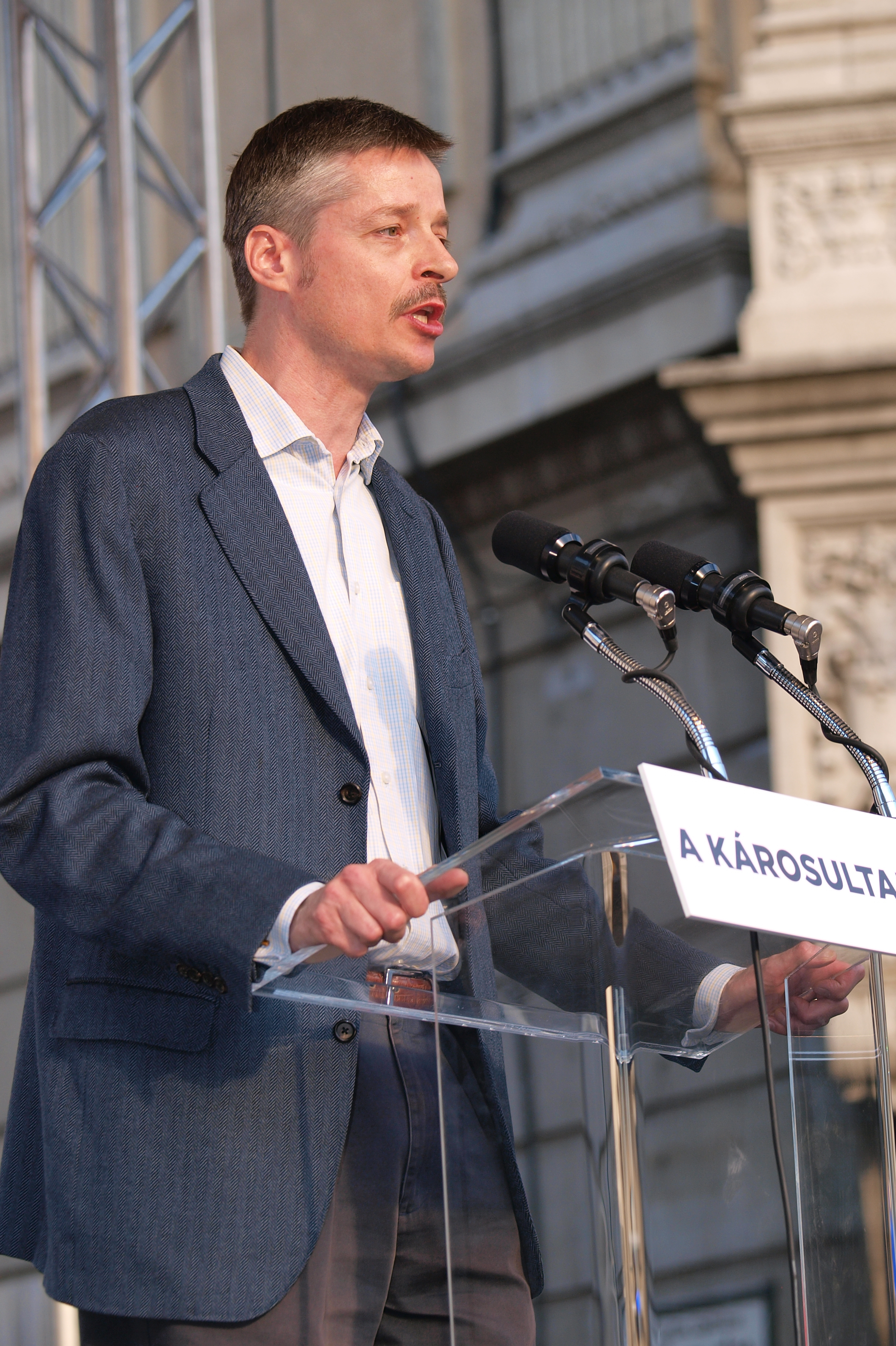
- Szabolcs Kerék-Bárczy
- Born: March 25, 1971; Székesfehérvár, Hungary
- Education: B.A. Northwestern University, M.P.P. Harvard University
- Occupation: Economist

Szabolcs Kerék-Bárczy (born March 25, 1971, in Székesfehérvár, Hungary) is a Hungarian politician and economist. He obtained a Master of Public Policy from the John F. Kennedy School of Government at Harvard.

== Background ==
Kerék-Bárczy graduated from the English-language class at Teleki Blanka Gymnasium in Székesfehérvár. He also studied in Budapest at the Foreign Trade College of Business Administration, graduating with a degree in 1992. In 1994, he was also awarded a certificate in Public Relations.

Kerék-Bárczy began his career at the Office of the Prime Minister: the Minister of Cabinet secretary from 1992 until 1994, and then the MDF parliamentary group of advisors representing the portion of economic MDF cabinet secretary where he worked until 1995. From 1994-95 he also taught as Assistant Professor at the College of Foreign Trade. Between 1997-98 he worked as a lobbyist for Matáv, and from 1998–99 and returned to the office of the Prime Minister as the Head of Cabinet of Ministers. From 1999 to 2001, he was principal adviser to the Minister of Foreign Affairs, and then for three years from 2001 to 2004 in the consulate of the Republic of Hungary in Los Angeles.

From 2004 until 2006, he worked for the Euro-Phoenix Financial Consulting Ltd. where he was Deputy Director. From 2007 - 2010 he worked at the Hungarian Democratic Forum, Cabinet spokesman and head of the Foreign Affairs, 2008-2010, National Board member of the MDF. Between 1997-2001 he served as an Advisory Board members for the Hungarian News Agency. In 2004 he was elected to Parliament in 2004 and taught at the Budapest Business School has been an honorary professor. In 1999, he was a German Marshall Fund Fellow. He has been a regular contributor to national and international issues in Hungarian public life in newspapers and magazines, and is listed as an expert in the electronic media.

In September 2016, on the Paradigm Change show on 168 Óra he made a written critique of his party, the Hungarian Democratic Forum. He then resigned from the party.
