= Pest County 1st constituency =

- Constituency for the National Assembly
- Location of Pest county 01 within Pest county

- Location of Pest county within Hungary
- County: Pest
- Electorate: 80,035 (2026)
- Major settlements: Érd

Current constituency
- Created: 2024
- Party: Tisza Party
- Member: József Jelencsik
- Elected: 2026

The Pest County 1st parliamentary constituency is one of the 106 constituencies into which the territory of Hungary is divided by Act LXXIX of 2024, and in which voters can elect one member of the National Assembly. The standard abbreviation of the constituency name is: Pest 01. OEVK. The seat is Érd.

== Area ==
The constituency includes the following settlements:

1. Érd
2. Százhalombatta
3. Tárnok

== Members of Parliament ==
| Name | Party | Term | Comment |
|---|---|---|---|
| Dr. Aradszki András | Fidesz-KDNP | 2014–2026 | Results of the 2014 parliamentary election: |
| Dr. Aradszki András | Fidesz-KDNP | 2014–2026 | Results of the 2018 parliamentary election: |
| Dr. Aradszki András | Fidesz-KDNP | 2014–2026 | Results of the 2022 parliamentary election: |
| József Jelencsik | Tisza Party | 2026 – present | Results of the 2026 parliamentary election: 60.11% |

== Demographic profile ==
Historical population
| Year | Pop. | ±% |
|---|---|---|
| 2011 | 98,558 | — |
| 2022 | 112,623 | +14.3% |

The population of the 1st constituency of Pest County was 112,623 on 1 October 2022. The population of the constituency increased by 14,065 between the 2011 and 2022 censuses. Based on the age composition, the majority of the population in the constituency is middle-aged with 41,485 people, while the fewest are elderly with 20,088 people. 90% of the population of the constituency has internet access.

According to the highest level of completed education, those with a high school diploma are the most numerous, with 33,581 people, followed by graduates with 28,261 people.

According to economic activity, almost half of the population is employed, 58,495 people, the second most significant group is inactive earners, who are mainly pensioners, with 20,962 people.

The most significant ethnic group in the constituency is Germans with 1,552 people and Gypsies with 461 people. The proportion of foreign citizens without Hungarian citizenship is 1.4%.

According to religious composition, the largest religion of the residents of the constituency is Roman Catholic (22,505 people), and a significant community is the Calvinist (7,514 people). The number of those not belonging to a religious community is also significant (14,885 people), the second largest group in the constituency after the Roman Catholic religion.

== Parliamentary elections ==
=== 2022 ===
2022 Hungarian parliamentary election
| Party | Candidate | Votes | % | ± % |
|---|---|---|---|---|
| Fidesz-KDNP | András Aradszki | 29,597 | 45.38 | ▲1.64 |
| United for Hungary | Anett Bősz | 28,076 | 43.05 | ▼10.76 |
| Our Homeland Movement | Károly Csott | 3,220 | 4.94 | New |
| MKKP | Kitti Ignáth | 2,067 | 3.17 | ▲1.31 |
| Independent | Éva Asztalos | 1,527 | 2.34 | New |
| MEMO | Valentin Váradi | 729 | 1.12 | New |
| Turnout | | 65,894 | 75.69 | ▲0.66 |
| Number of voters | | 87,054 | 100 | ▲4.79 |
Fidesz-KDNP holds the district.

=== 2018 ===
2018 Hungarian parliamentary election
| Party | Candidate | | Votes | % | ± % |
|---|---|---|---|---|---|
| | Fidesz-KDNP | András Aradszki | 26,987 | 43.74 | ▲0.77 |
| | MSZP-Párbeszéd | László Csőzik | 21,888 | 35.47 | ▲3.85 |
| | Jobbik | Sebestyén Vágó | 8,014 | 12.99 | ▼3.02 |
| | LMP | Szabolcs Turcsán | 2,264 | 3.67 | ▼1.97 |
| | MKKP | Barbara Szécsi | 1,146 | 1.86 | New |
| | Momentum | Alex Gál | 1,035 | 1.68 | New |
| | Other parties | | 368 | 0.6 | ▼3.18 |
| Turnout | | | 62,191 | 75.03 | ▲9.13 |
| Number of voters | | | 82,885 | 100 | ▲4.22 |
Fidesz-KDNP holds the district.

=== 2014 ===
2014 Hungarian parliamentary election
| Party | Candidate | | Votes | % |
|---|---|---|---|---|
| | Fidesz-KDNP | András Aradszki | 22,271 | 42.97 |
| | Összefogás | Dávid Dorosz | 16,386 | 31.62 |
| | Jobbik | Edina Pulai | 8,295 | 16.01 |
| | LMP | Varga Illés Levente | 2,923 | 5.64 |
| | Other parties | | 1,950 | 3.78 |
| Turnout | | | 52,320 | 65.9 |
| Number of voters | | | 79,388 | 100 |
Fidesz-KDNP holds the district.

== 2021 opposition primary election ==
2021 Hungarian opposition primary
| Faction | Nominating organizations | Candidate | Votes | % |
|---|---|---|---|---|
| DK | DK, Liberálisok, Jobbik, MMM | Anett Bősz | 5,586 | 60.79 |
| LMP | Jobbik, LMP, ÚK, ÚVNP, MMM | Örs Tetlák | 1,956 | 21.29 |
| Momentum | Momentum, MSZP, Párbeszéd | Ollero Marco | 1,647 | 17.92 |
| Total votes | | | 9,189 | |
Anett Bősz wins the district.
