= György Szilágyi (politician) =

Hungarian politician

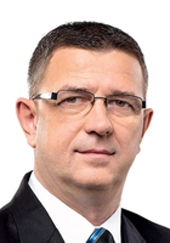
György Szilágyi

György Szilágyi (Budapest, 11 November 1966) is a Hungarian politician, vice-president of Jobbik and member of the National Assembly.

He is married and has two children. He graduated from Semmelweis University in 2006 and he became a sports manager. He was a sportsman of Ferencváros TC for 11 years. He founded the Ferencváros Torna Club Supporter Association.

He worked at Pannon Rádió as broadcaster. MIÉP was the first party he joined. He was the sports expert in the party parliamentary group. He joined Jobbik in 2008 and founded the sports cabinet of the party. Since 2010 he is a member of the National Assembly. On 25 January 2020, he was elected as vice-president of Jobbik.
