= Pest County 8th constituency =

- Constituency for the National Assembly
- Location of Pest county 08 within Pest county

- Location of Pest county within Hungary
- County: Pest County
- Electorate: 70,425 (2026)
- Major settlements: Vecsés

Current constituency
- Created: 2024
- Party: Tisza Party
- Member: István Balajti
- Elected: 2026

The Pest County 8th parliamentary constituency is one of the 106 constituencies into which the territory of Hungary is divided by Act LXXIX of 2024, and in which voters can elect one member of the National Assembly. The standard abbreviation of the constituency name is: Pest 08. OEVK. The seat is Vecsés.

== Area ==
The constituency includes the following settlements:

1. Ecser
2. Felsőpakony
3. Gyál
4. Gyömrő
5. Péteri
6. Üllő
7. Vecsés

== Members of parliament ==
Name	Party	Terminus	References
Zoltán Bóna	Fidesz-KDNP	2014 – 2026	
István Balajti	Tisza Party	2026 –	

== Demographics ==
Historical population
Year	Pop.	±%
2011	104,837	—
2022	118,283	+12.8%

The demographics of the constituency are as follows. The population of the 8th constituency of Pest County was 118,283 on 1 October 2022. The population of the constituency increased by 13,446 between the 2011 and 2022 censuses. Based on the age composition, the majority of the population in the constituency is middle-aged with 43,986 people, while the fewest are elderly with 20,227 people. 88.3% of the population of the constituency has internet access

According to the highest level of completed education, those with a high school diploma are the most numerous, with 38,955 people, followed by graduates with 20,859 people.

According to economic activity, almost half of the population is employed, 61,576 people, the second most significant group is inactive earners, who are mainly pensioners, with 21,848 people.

The most significant ethnic group in the constituency is Germans with 1,273 people and Gypsies with 789 people. The proportion of foreign citizens without Hungarian citizenship is 1.1%.

According to religious composition, the largest religion of the residents of the constituency is Roman Catholic (20,184 people), and there is also a significant community of Calvinists (9,365 people). The number of those not belonging to a religious community is also significant (18,108 people), the second largest group in the constituency after the Roman Catholic religion.

== Sources ==
- ↑ Vjt.: "2011. évi CCIII. törvény az országgyűlési képviselők választásáról". Nemzeti Jogszabálytár. Magyar Közlöny Lap- és Könyvkiadó Kft.
- ↑ KSH: "Az országgyűlési egyéni választókerületek adatai". Népszámlálás 2011. Központi Statisztikai Hivatal.
