= Monika Rónaszéki-Keresztes =

Hungarian educator and politician

Member of the National Assembly
- In office 14 May 2010 – 5 May 2014

Personal details
- Born: 17 May 1962 (age 63) Budapest, Hungary
- Party: Fidesz (since 2003)
- Spouse: Balázs Rónaszéki
- Children: Bernadett; Regina; Álmos; Mónika; Balázs; József; János Zsigmond
- Profession: teacher, politician

Monika Mária Rónaszéki-Keresztes (née Keresztes; born 17 May 1962) is a Hungarian educator and politician, member of the National Assembly (MP) for Erzsébetváros (Budapest Constituency 9) between 2010 and 2014. She was also appointed a vice mayor of Erzsébetváros (District VII, Budapest) in October 2010.

She was a member of the Committee on Youth, Social, Family, and Housing Affairs from 14 May 2010 to 5 May 2014, and Committee on Human Rights, Minority, Civic and Religious Affairs from 18 February 2013 to 5 May 2014. She was defeated by Lajos Oláh (DK) at Budapest Constituency 5 in the 2014 parliamentary election.

== Personal life ==
She married electric engineer Balázs Rónaszéki in 1983. They have together seven children - Bernadett, Regina, Álmos, Mónika, Balázs, József, János Zsigmond. She is member of Fidesz since 2003.
