= Szabolcs-Szatmár-Bereg County 1st constituency =

National Assembly constituency in Hungary (2014–)

- Constituency for the National Assembly
- Location of Szabolcs-Szatmár-Bereg county 01 within Szabolcs-Szatmár-Bereg county

- Location of Szabolcs-Szatmár-Bereg county within Hungary
- County: Szabolcs-Szatmár-Bereg County
- Population: 90,936 (2022)
- Major settlements: Nyíregyháza

Current constituency
- Created: 2011
- Party: Tisza Party
- Member: László Gajdos
- Elected: 2026

The Szabolcs-Szatmár-Bereg County 1st parliamentary constituency is one of the 106 constituencies into which the territory of Hungary is divided by Act CCIII of 2011, and in which voters can elect one member of the National Assembly. The standard abbreviation of the constituency name is: Szabolcs-Szatmár-Bereg 01. OEVK. The seat is Nyíregyháza.

The constituency consists of one settlement, the city of Nyíregyháza.

== History ==
In 2022, the constituency had a population of 90,936, and the district is characterized by a stagnant population. The number of residents eligible to vote was 71,878 in December 2025. Based on its population structure, it is urban. Based on the income data for 2022, the majority of the constituency can be classified as upper-middle-income. A district defined by people with medium and high education according to the highest completed educational level.

Between 2014 and 2018, Attila Petneházy (Fidesz-KDNP) was its Member of Parliament, then withdrew from the candidacy before the 2018 election, and Dr. Tünde Szabó (Fidesz-KDNP) ran in his place, who won and has represented the constituency until 2026. In the 2026 election, László Gajdos (Tisza) was elected representative.

In terms of competitiveness, it can be described as a ruling party (Fidesz-KDNP) dominated constituency, but it is in a state of flux.

The representative of the constituency is: László Gajdos (Tisza Party).

== Area ==
The constituency consists of one settlement, the city of Nyíregyháza. It comprises the area enclosed by the sections from the entry point of the railway line coming from Buj at the city border to Kótaji út, the odd side of Kótaji út to Stadion út, the odd side of Vasvári Pál út to Északi körút, Északi körút (both sides) to Rákóczi út, the odd side of Mező út to Bethlen Gábor út, the even side of Bethlen Gábor út to the railway line, the railway line going towards Nagykálló to the exit at the city border, the city border in a counter-clockwise direction to the entry point of the railway line coming from Buj at the city border.

== Members of parliament ==
Name	Party	Term	Election
Attila Petneházy	Fidesz-KDNP	2014 – 2018	Results of the 2014 parliamentary election:
Tünde Szabó	Fidesz-KDNP	2018–2026	Results of the 2018 parliamentary election:
Tünde Szabó	Fidesz-KDNP	2018–2026	Results of the 2022 parliamentary election:
László Gajdos	Tisza Party	2026 – present	Results of the 2026 parliamentary election: 64.77%

== Demographics ==
Historical population
Year	Pop.	±%
2011	90,915	—
2022	90,936	+0.0%

The demographics of the constituency are as follows. The population of constituency No. 1 of Szabolcs-Szatmár-Bereg County was 90,936 on 1 October 2022. The population of the constituency increased by 21 people between the 2011 and 2022 censuses. Based on the age composition, the majority of the population in the constituency is middle-aged with 34,010 people, while the least is children with 15,480 people. 87.3% of the population of the constituency has internet access.

According to the highest level of completed education, those with a high school diploma are the most numerous, with 28,558 people, followed by graduates with 23,472 people.

According to economic activity, almost half of the population is employed, 45,842 people, the second most significant group is inactive earners, who are mainly pensioners, with 20,104 people.

The most significant ethnic group in the constituency is Ukrainian with 573 people and Gypsy with 487 people. The proportion of foreign citizens without Hungarian citizenship is 1.1%.

According to religious composition, the largest religion of the residents of the constituency is Roman Catholic (12,755 people), followed by a significant community of Calvinists (12,730 people). The number of those not belonging to a religious community is also significant (6,596 people), the third largest group in the constituency after Roman Catholics and Calvinists.

== Sources ==
- ↑ Vjt.: "2011. évi CCIII. törvény az országgyűlési képviselők választásáról". Nemzeti Jogszabálytár. Magyar Közlöny Lap- és Könyvkiadó Kft.
- ↑ KSH: "Az országgyűlési egyéni választókerületek adatai". Népszámlálás 2011. Központi Statisztikai Hivatal.
