= Lőrinc Nacsa =

Hungarian politician

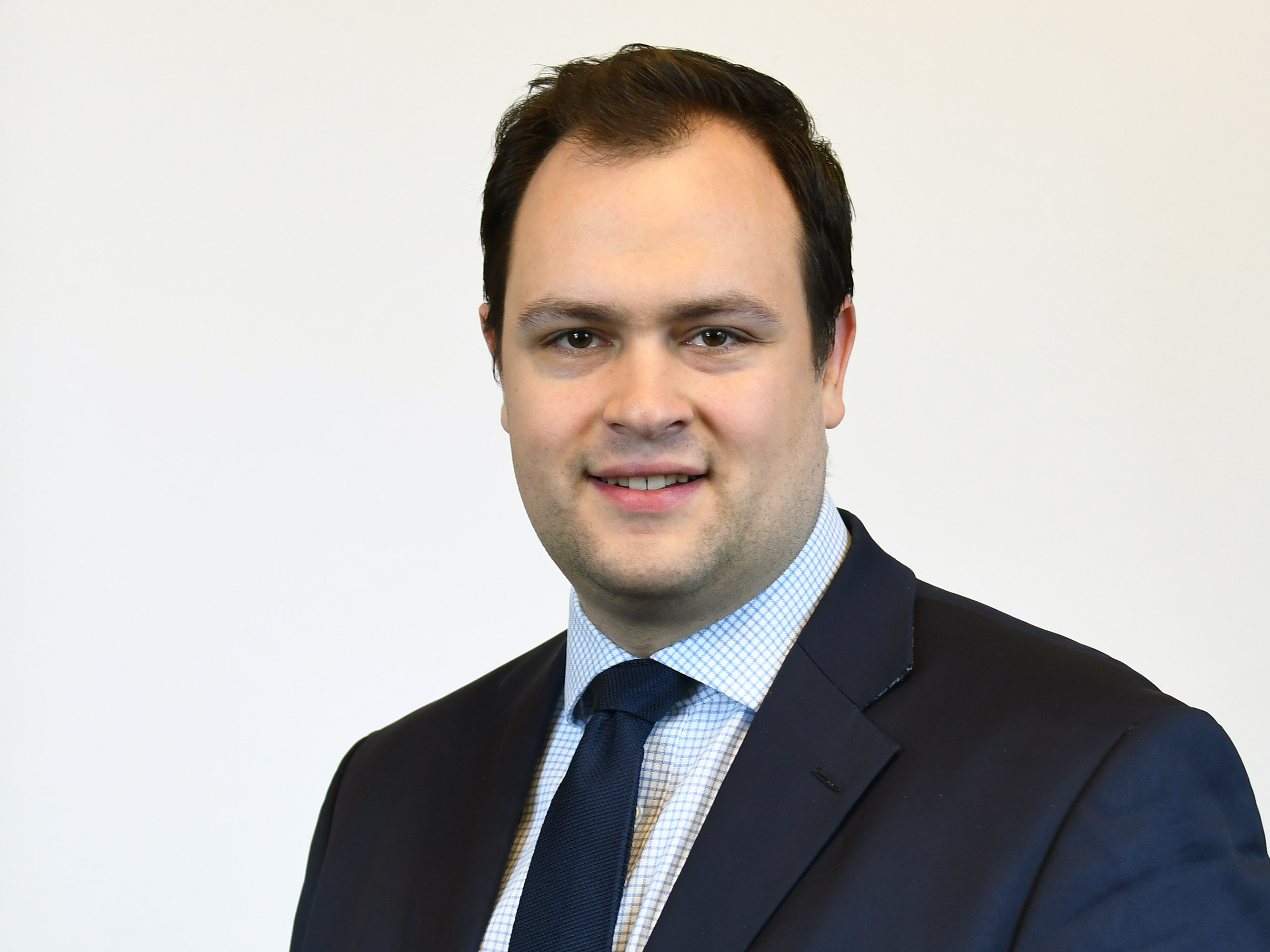
- Nacsa in 2016

Member of the National Assembly
- Incumbent
- Assumed office 8 May 2018

Personal details
- Born: 5 April 1990 (age 36) Budapest
- Citizenship: Hungary

Lőrinc Nacsa (born 5 April 1990 in Budapest, Hungary) is a Hungarian politician. He is a member of parliament in the National Assembly of Hungary (Országgyűlés) since May 2018. He is a member of the Parliamentary Assembly of the Council of Europe. On 15 June 2021, he was elected one of the vice-presidents of the EPP groups in the Parliamentary Assembly of the Council of Europe.
