= Budapest 7th constituency =

Hungarian legislative district

Coordinates: 47°30′N 19°06′E

Budapest 7th constituency (District XIII.)
- Constituency for the National Assembly
- Location of Budapest 07 within Budapest

- Location of Budapest within Hungary
- City: Budapest
- Electorate: 80,781 (2018)
- Major settlements: 13th District

Current constituency
- Created: 2011
- Party: Tisza Party
- Member: Balázs Trentin
- Created from: Constituency no. 19; Constituency no. 20
- Elected: 2026

The 7th constituency of Budapest (Hungarian: Budapesti 07. számú országgyűlési egyéni választókerület) is one of the single-member constituencies of the National Assembly, the national legislature of Hungary. The constituency standard abbreviation: Budapest 07. OEVK.

Since 2026, it has been represented by Balázs Trentin of the Tisza Party.

== Geography ==
The 7th constituency is located in the central-northern part of Pest.

The constituency borders the 11th constituency to the north, the 8th constituency to the east, the 8th and 1st constituencies to the south, and the 4th and 10th constituencies to the west.

=== List of districts ===
The constituency includes the following municipalities:

1. District XIII.: Main part (except northern side) of the district.

== History ==
The current 7th constituency of Budapest was created in 2011 and contains the pre-2011 19th and 20th constituencies of Budapest. Its borders have not changed since its creation.

== Members ==
The constituency was first represented by Dezső Hiszékeny of MSZP (with Unity support) from 2014, and he was re-elected in 2018 and 2022 (with United for Hungary support). In the 2026 election, Balázs Trentin of the Tisza Party was elected representative.

Election	Member	Party	%
2014 (Note: As part of Unity.)	Dezső Hiszékeny	MSZP	51.3
2018 (Note: As part of MSZP–Dialogue.)	Dezső Hiszékeny	MSZP	56.5
2022 (Note: As part of United for Hungary.)	Dezső Hiszékeny	MSZP	60.5
2026	Balázs Trentin	TISZA	63.7

== Election result ==
=== 2026 election ===
Result 2026
1. Balázs Trentin, TISZA (63.7%)
2. Dr. Róbert Antal Kovács, Fidesz–KDNP (28.5%)
3. János Czeglédi, Our Homeland (4.20%)
4. Gergely Arató, DK (2.10%)
5. Ond Kling, MKKP (1.00%)

2026 parliamentary election: Budapest - 7th constituency
Party	Candidate	Votes	%	±%
Tisza	Balázs Trentin	38,809	63.68	New
Fidesz–KDNP	Dr. Róbert Antal Kovács	17,340	28.45	−1.94
Mi Hazánk	János Czeglédi	2,561	4.20	+0.93
DK	Gergely Arató	1,287	2.11	
MKKP	Ond Kling	639	1.05	−3.15
Independent	Csongor Vékony	305	0.50	
Majority		21,469	35.23	
Turnout		61,266	81.28	▲7.14
Registered electors		75,379		
Tisza gain from United for Hungary		Swing		

=== 2022 election ===
Result 2022
1. Dezső Hiszékeny, United for Hungary (60.5%)
2. Tamás Harrach, Fidesz–KDNP (30.4%)
3. Zsuzsanna Döme, MKKP (4.20%)
4. Dr. Márta Aleva, Our Homeland (3.30%)
5. Bajnok Halmi, MEMO (1.20%)
6. Dr. István Károly Varga, NÉP (0.40%)

2022 parliamentary election: Budapest - 7th constituency
Party	Candidate	Votes	%	±%
United for Hungary	Dezső Hiszékeny	35,248	60.53	
Fidesz–KDNP	Tamás Harrach	17,697	30.39	+1.9
MKKP	Dr. Márta Aleva	2,445	4.20	+2.14
Mi Hazánk	Zsolt Nagy	1,907	3.27	New
MEMO	Bajnok Halmi	675	1.16	New
NÉP	Dr. István Károly Varga	263	0.45	New
Majority		17,551	30.14	
Turnout		58,820	74.24	▲0.39
Registered electors		79,234		
United for Hungary hold		Swing	+2.2	

=== 2018 election ===
Result 2018
1. Dezső Hiszékeny, MSZP-P (56.5%)
2. Tamás Harrach, Fidesz–KDNP (28.5%)
3. Adrián Magvasi, Jobbik (6.10%)
4. István Kerékgyártó, LMP (4.10%)
5. Miklós Hajnal, Momentum (2.60%)
6. Ferenc Sebő, MKKP (2.20%)

2018 parliamentary election: Budapest - 7th constituency
Party	Candidate	Votes	%	±%
MSZP–Dialogue	Dezső Hiszékeny	33,412	56.48	as Unity
Fidesz–KDNP	Tamás Harrach	16,854	28.49	−2.16
Jobbik	Adrián Magvasi	3,591	6.07	−2.57
LMP	István Kerékgyártó	2,447	4.14	−2.98
Momentum	Miklós Hajnal	1,520	2.57	New
MKKP	Ferenc Sebő	1,337	2.26	New
Majority		16,558	27.99	
Turnout		59,654	73.85	▲6.75
Registered electors		80,781		
MSZP–Dialogue hold		Swing	+7.4	

=== 2014 election ===
Result 2014
1. Dezső Hiszékeny, Unity (51.3%)
2. Dr. Péter Szalay, Fidesz–KDNP (30.7%)
3. László Benke, Jobbik (8.60%)
4. László Moldován, LMP (7.10%)
5. Other parties (less than 1%) (2.30%)

2014 parliamentary election: Budapest - 7th constituency
Party	Candidate	Votes	%	±%
Unity	Dezső Hiszékeny	27,514	51.25	
Fidesz–KDNP	Dr. Péter Szalay	16,453	30.65	
Jobbik	László Benke	4,640	8.64	
LMP	László Moldován	3,821	7.12	
SEM	Gabriella Jakab	386	0.72	
SMS	Péterné Szekeres	331	0.62	
ÖP	Leila Póka	129	0.24	
Soc Dems	Tamás Kern	128	0.24	
JESZ	Mihály Székely	110	0.2	
MCP	Tamás Csík	67	0.12	
EP	Attila Pál Tóth	62	0.12	
MSZDP	Gyula Iváncsevits	45	0.08	
Majority		11,061	20.6	
Turnout		54,285	67.1	
Registered electors		80,903		
Unity win (new seat)				
