= Zoltán Bóna =

Hungarian politician

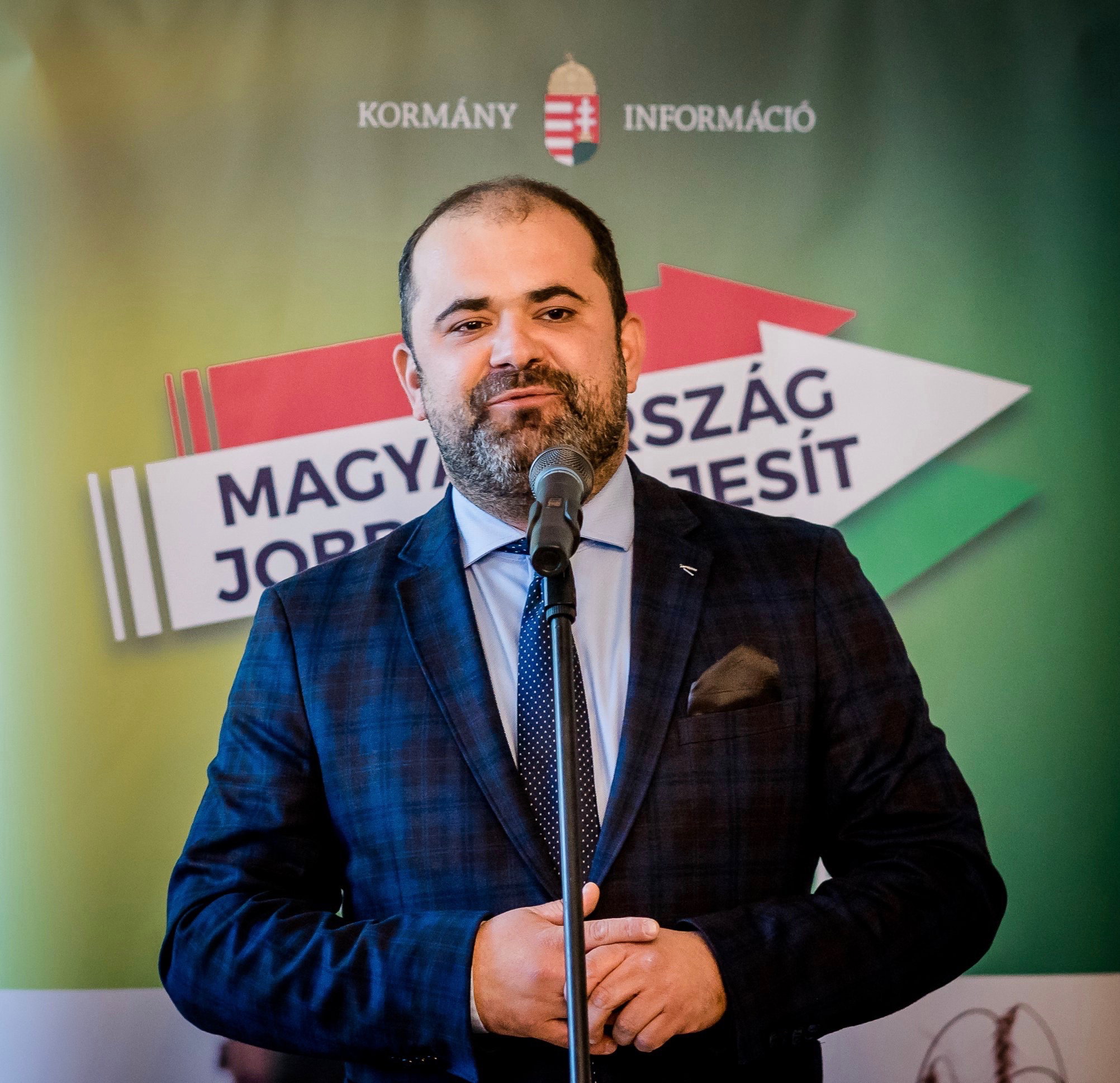
- Zoltán Bóna in 2019

Member of the National Assembly
- In office 6 May 2014 – 8 May 2026

Personal details
- Born: 9 May 1981 (age 45) Kerepestarcsa, Hungary (present-day Kistarcsa and Kerepes)
- Party: Fidesz (since 2003)
- Other political affiliations: National Forum
- Profession: politician

Zoltán Bóna (born 9 May 1981) is a Hungarian politician, who was member of the National Assembly (MP) for Szigetszentmiklós (Pest County Constituency VIII) from 2014 to 2026. He also served as the mayor of Dunavarsány from 2005 to 2014.

== Studies and social activity ==
Zoltán Bóna was born on 9 May 1981 in Kerepestarcsa (present-day Kistarcsa and Kerepes), as the son of Calvinist pastor and theologian Zoltán Bóna Sr., editor-in-chief of journal Theologiai Szemle. Bóna spent his childhood in Dunavarsány. He finished his secondary studies at the Batthyány Kázmér Secondary Grammar School in Szigetszentmiklós in 2000. He earned a degree of theology at the J. Selye University in Komárno, Slovakia in 2010.

Since its establishment in 1989, he has been a member of the Kossuth Lajos Scout Team No. 724 in Dunavarsány, and since 2010 he has also been a member of the Soli Deo Gloria Community. Since March 2017, he has been the chairman of the board of trustees of the Summerfest International Folklore Festival and the Folklore Fair of Százhalombatta, which organizes the Folk Art Fair every year.

== Political career ==
Bóna is a founding member of the local branch of Fidesz in Dunavarsány in 2003, presiding it since then. He also became a member of the Fidesz-ally National Forum, a political organization led by Sándor Lezsák. After the local representative body in Dunavarsány decided to abolish themselves following sharp political debates over the sewer system modernization contracts, Bóna was elected mayor of the town as candidate of the Fidesz during a by-election on 26 September 2005, aged 24, becoming the youngest mayor in Hungary in that year. He was re-elected as mayor in the 2006 and 2010 local elections. Beside that, Bóna was also a member of the General Assembly of Pest County from 2010 to 2014. He was vice-president of the Csepel Island and Surroundings Multi-Purpose Local Government Association from 2010 until its dissolution in 2013.

He was appointed chairman of the local branch of Fidesz in Szigetszentmiklós constituency in 2013, and with this he officially became the candidate of the party for the upcoming 2014 parliamentary election. Bóna was elected a Member of Parliament for Pest County 8th constituency (Szigetszentmiklós), defeating Gábor Kuncze, the candidate of the Unity joint opposition electoral alliance. In the parliament, Bóna has been a member of the Legislative Committee since 2014 and the National Cohesion Committee from 2014 to 2018 (he was also a vice-chairman of the latter committee for two short times, in May–June 2014 and May–October 2018). He also functioned as a vice-chairman of the Committee on Agriculture between May and June 2018. Bóna was appointed deputy leader of the Fidesz parliamentary group on 2 October 2017. He was re-elected as MP for Szigetszentmiklós in the 2018 parliamentary election, defeating his rivals Zsolt Stefanik (MSZP) and János Lupa (Jobbik). He has been the Ministerial Commissioner within the Prime Minister's Office, responsible for the development tasks of Pest County since 1 August 2018.

== Arrest ==
Bóna was arrested on 11 May 2026, under charges of corruption.
