= András Aradszki =

Hungarian politician

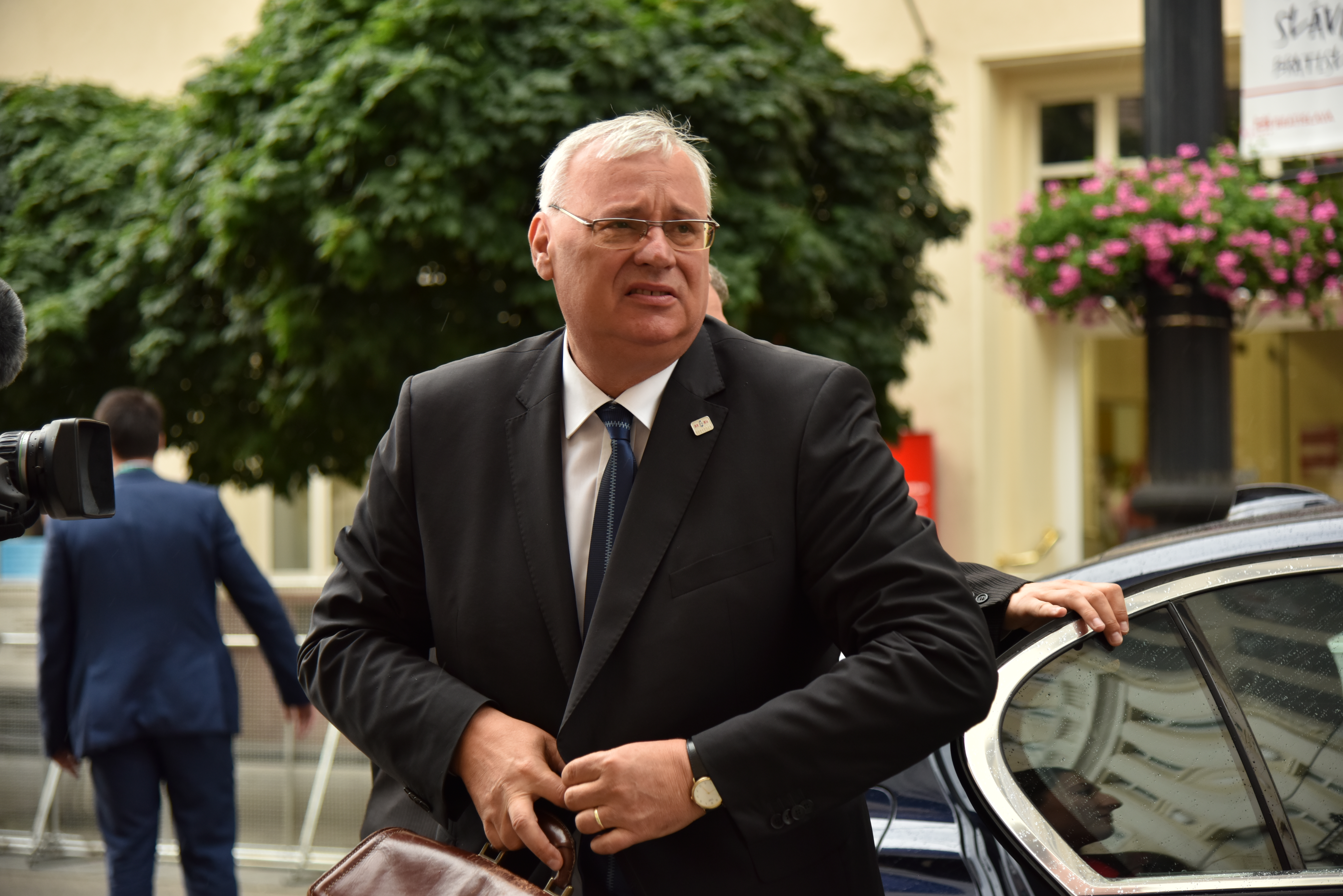

Member of the National Assembly
- In office 14 May 2010 – 8 May 2026

Personal details
- Born: 22 May 1956 (age 69) Békéscsaba, Hungary
- Party: KDNP
- Spouse: Dr Éva Aradszkiné Kapeller
- Children: Nóra; Dea
- Profession: politician

András Aradszki (born 22 May 1956), is a Hungarian politician and member of the National Assembly for Érd (MP) from 2010 to 2026. He was appointed Secretary of State for Energy in the Ministry of National Development in 2014. As a Member of Parliament, he worked in the Committee for Economic and Information Technology and Committee on Sustainable Development. He was also a member of the Public Procurement Council from 2006 to 2010.

== Political career ==
András Aradszki was MP for the Pest County 1st constituency. He did not run in the 2026 Hungarian parliamentary election.

== Personal life ==
He is married. His wife is Dr Éva Aradszkiné Kapeller. They have two daughters, Nóra and Dea.

== Coquetry with racism ==
On 20 February 2020, muddling the ethnicity with the social circumstances, he published the following faux-naïf post to his Hungarian Facebook account (translated): "I don't understand...if 80% of the prisoners is romani, the judge is racist?"
