= György Hubay =

Hungarian politician (born c. 1954)

Member of the National Assembly
- In office 8 May 2018 – 1 May 2022

Personal details
- Born: c. 1954
- Party: MIÉP; Fidesz
- Profession: cyclist, politician

György Hubay (born c. 1954) is a Hungarian cyclist and politician, who had been a member of National Assembly from 8 May 2018 to 1 May 2022, representing Miskolc (Borsod-Abaúj-Zemplén County 2nd constituency).

== Life ==
Hubay was born around 1954. He was a professional cyclist in the early 1970s. He claims he was a four-time national champion between 1971 and 1974, but contemporary sports databases do not confirm this. He could not prove either that he ever finished his secondary studies. Thereafter, he worked in the catering industry. According to himself, he worked in South America thereafter.

Returning to Hungary, Hubay was a supporter of István Csurka, a politician from the Hungarian Democratic Forum (MDF) and the Hungarian Justice and Life Party (MIÉP) in the 1990s. He finished a training course of sports organizer and manager at the Faculty of Physical Education and Sports Science of the Semmelweis University in 2000. He was chief organizer of local festival Zsongó Lillafüred in Miskolc in 2003.

== Political career ==
Hubay was president of the local branch of MIÉP in Miskolc from February 1999 to November 2003. He was a member of the general assembly of Miskolc as candidate of MIÉP from 1998 to 2006 (his candidacy was also supported by KDNP in the 1998 local elections), heading the assembly's sports and youth committee. Hubay was elected the Borsod-Abaúj-Zemplén County branch of MIÉP in November 2003. He unsuccessfully ran for a seat in the general assembly of Miskolc during the 2006 Hungarian local elections, as a joint candidate of two civil organizations, the Association of Independents of Miskolc and the Medical Society of Miskolc. After the 2010 Hungarian local elections, he became a confidant of mayor Ákos Kriza and he was employed by Miskolc Holding Ltd., which operates the companies of the municipality. As a politician of Fidesz, Hubay served as a member of the general assembly of Miskolc between 2014 and 2018. He functioned as chairman of the assembly's law enforcement committee and was also entrusted to administer Salkaházi program for retirees.

Hubay was nominated by the Fidesz to become a Member of Parliament for Miskolc (Borsod-Abaúj-Zemplén County 2nd constituency) in the 2018 parliamentary election. He narrowly defeated Socialist politician László Varga. He was a member of the Defense and Law Enforcement Committee from 2018 to 2022. He was appointed a vice-chairman of that committee in May 2020. He was also a member of the National Security Committee in the same period. In November 2018, Heti Világgazdaság revealed that Hubay rented two offices in Miskolc above market price from his own employer Miskolc Holding Ltd., while he never held office hours for his constituents. Hubay was replaced as candidate of Fidesz by János Kiss for the 2022 Hungarian parliamentary election in Miskolc 2nd constituency. Kiss ultimately gained the mandate.
