= Lajos Oláh =

Hungarian politician (born 1969)

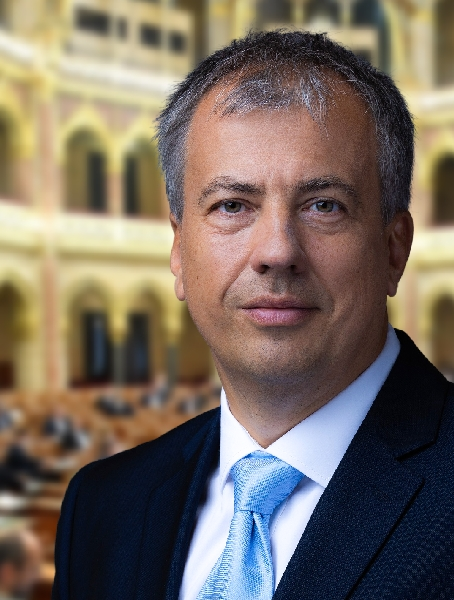

Member of the National Assembly
- In office 16 May 2006 – 8 May 2026

Personal details
- Born: 17 June 1969 (age 57) Karcag, Hungary
- Party: MSZP (?–2011); DK (2011– )
- Occupation: Jurist, Politician

Lajos Oláh (born 17 June 1969) is a Hungarian politician and jurist. He was a member of the National Assembly of Hungary from 2006 to 2026. He served as Secretary of State in the Ministry of Environment and Water from 2008 to 2009, then in the Ministry of Transport, Communications and Energy.

== Profession ==
Lajos Oláh was born on 17 June 1969 in Karcag. He finished his elementary and secondary studies in Debrecen. He earned law degree at the Faculty of Law of the Eötvös Loránd University (ELTE) in 1993. He spent a semester during his university years at the Stellenbosch University and the Rand Afrikaans University in South Africa. Oláh speaks English and Russian at the negotiation level. He is married, father of two children.

He is co-president of the Great Wall Hungarian–Chinese Friendship Association since 2012. He also established its annual award, the Award for Sino–Hungarian Friendship. Over the years, he has developed significant relationships with members of China's political and economic elite. He is a member of the Hungarian UN Society, the Hungarian Geographical Society and the International Ragweed Society (IRS).

== Political career ==
Oláh began his political career as a member of the Hungarian Socialist Party (MSZP). He functioned as chairman of the party's branch in Hajdú-Bihar County from 2003 to 2010. Oláh was elected a Member of Parliament via the MSZP regional list of Hajdú-Bihar County in the 2006 parliamentary election. He was a member of the Committee on the Environment from 2006 to 2008. After Prime Minister Ferenc Gyurcsány formed his minority government, he served as a secretary of state in the Ministry of Environment and Water from 1 May 2008 to 15 April 2009. In this capacity, he was also a member of the Research and Technological Innovation Council. Oláh held the position of secretary of state in the Ministry of Transport, Communications and Energy during the cabinet of Gordon Bajnai, from 21 April 2009 to 29 May 2010.

During the 2010 parliamentary election, Oláh was re-elected MP via MSZP regional list of Hajdú-Bihar County, but the party itself suffered a heavy defeat against Fidesz. Oláh was vice-chairman of the Committee on Sustainable Development between 2010 and 2011. Oláh belonged to Gyurcsány's inner circle, which heavily criticized the leadership of the MSZP. As a result, he joined Democratic Coalition Platform founded by the former prime minister. When the platform split from the Socialists on 22 October 2011 he joined to newly formed party and left the MSZP and its parliamentary group. Formally, Oláh was an independent MP between 2011 and 2018. He lost the position of vice-chairman, but retained his membership in the Committee on Sustainable Development until 2014.

Oláh ran as a joint candidate of the Unity electoral alliance in Erzsébetváros (5th constituency, Budapest) during the 2014 parliamentary election. He narrowly defeated Fidesz candidate Monika Rónaszéki-Keresztes with the margin of 0.6 percent. He was a member of the Committee on Foreign Affairs from 2014 to 2018. Oláh was re-elected MP for Erzsébetváros in the 2018 parliamentary election, defeating Fidesz candidate István Bajkai. He had been vice-chairman of the Committee on European Affairs and a member of the Parliamentary Assembly of the Council of Europe from 2018 to 2022.

Prior to the 2019 local elections, the Democratic Coalition signed a written agreement with the Hungarian Socialist Party that the DK candidate, Péter Niedermüller, will run for mayor in the 7th district, and in return the MSZP can stand as a candidate for the parliamentary elections. In 2021, DK broke this agreement without justification and insisted that Oláh should again be the common candidate. The MSZP accepted the amendment. Lajos Oláh won the primary election in his constituency. In the parliamentary election held on 3 April 2022, he again became the single member of the constituency, winning 20,561 votes and an absolute majority of 51.39%. He served as a deputy speaker of the parliament from 2022 to 2026. Oláh did not run as individual candidate in the 2026 Hungarian parliamentary election, and Democratic Coalition failed to win any mandates, thus he lost his parliamentary seat after 20 years.
