= István Bajkai =

Hungarian lawyer and politician (1964–2023)

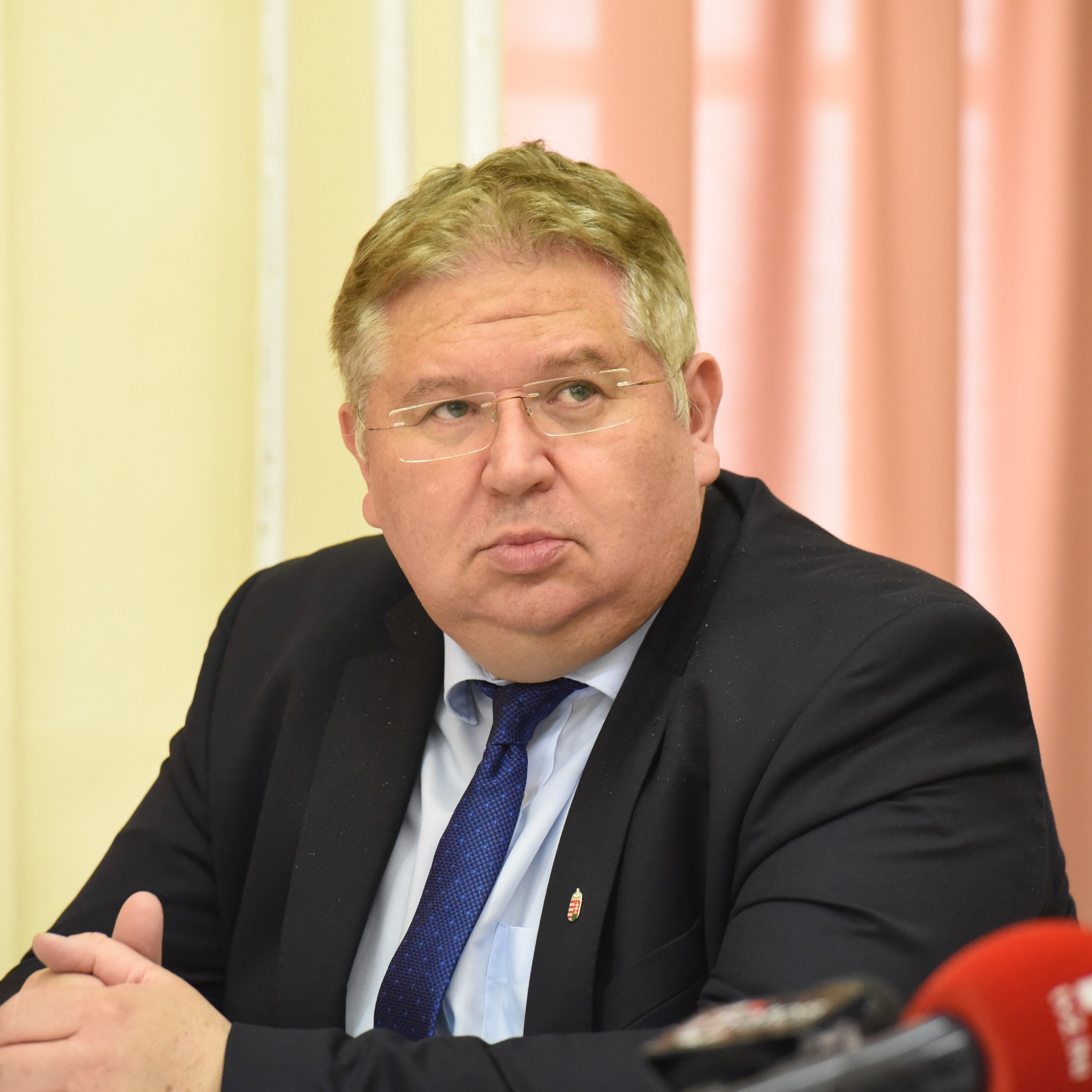
- Bajkai in 2021

Member of the National Assembly
- In office 18 May 2018 – 22 April 2023

President of Hungarian Boxing Association
- In office 2019–2023
- Preceded by: Zsolt Erdei
- Succeeded by: Csaba Kutrucz

Personal details
- Born: 17 January 1964 Budapest, Hungarian People's Republic
- Died: 22 April 2023 (aged 59) Budapest, Hungary
- Education: Eötvös Loránd University (JD)
- Occupation: Lawyer · politician
- Awards: Laurus Award (2017)

István Bajkai (17 January 1964 – 22 April 2023) was a Hungarian lawyer and politician. He was a member of National Assembly of Hungary (Országgyűlés). He was a founding member of Fidesz.

Bajkai died on 22 April 2023, at the age of 59.

== See also ==
- List of members of the National Assembly of Hungary (2018–2022)
