= Nyírtelek =

Town in Hungary

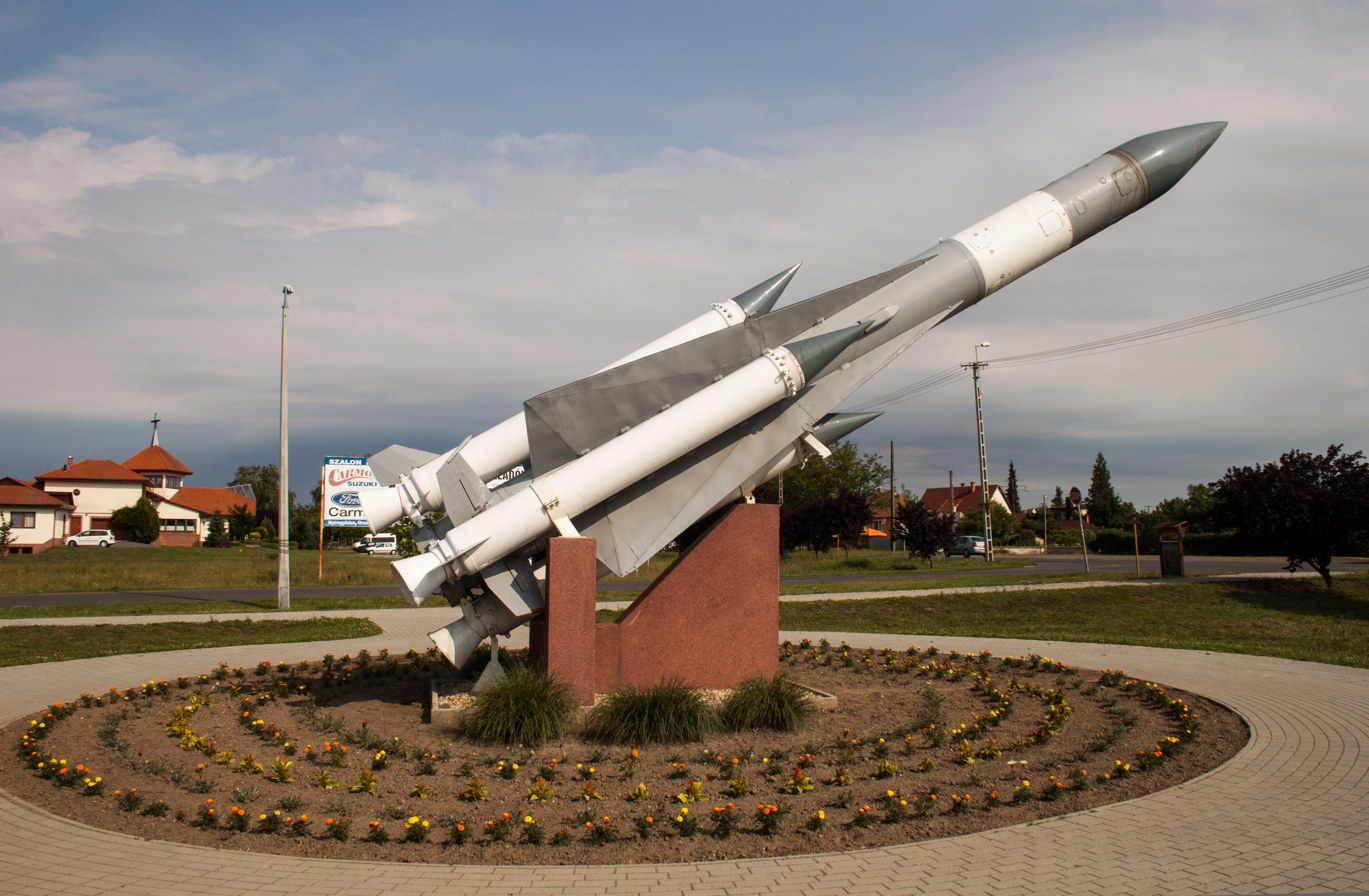
- Defence Memorial Park, Nyírtelek

- Flag Coat of arms

- Location within Hungary
- Coordinates: 48°01′N 21°38′E
- Country: Hungary
- County: Szabolcs-Szatmár-Bereg

Area
  - Total: 67.92 km^{2} (26.22 sq mi)

Population (2005)
  - Total: 7,114
  - Density: 105.21/km^{2} (272.5/sq mi)
- Time zone: UTC+1 (CET)
  - Summer (DST): UTC+2 (CEST)
- Postal code: 4461
- Area code: 42

Nyírtelek is a town in Szabolcs-Szatmár-Bereg county, in the Northern Great Plain region of eastern Hungary.

== History ==
The town was separated from Nyíregyháza and became an independent settlement in January 1952 under the name Sőrekút. It was renamed to its current name still in that year, in November 1952.

== Geography ==
It covers an area of 67.92 km^{2} (26 sq mi) and has a population of 7114 people (2005).
