= Győző Vinnai =

Hungarian politician

Member of the National Assembly
- Incumbent
- Assumed office 14 May 2010

Personal details
- Born: 17 December 1959 (age 66) Nyírtelek, Hungary
- Party: Fidesz (since 2002)
- Profession: College professor, politician

Dr. Győző Vinnai (born December 17, 1959) is a Hungarian college professor and politician, member of the National Assembly (MP) for Nyíregyháza (Szabolcs-Szatmár-Bereg County Constituency II) since 2010.

Currently he educates twentieth-century history at the College of Nyíregyháza. He became a member of the Fidesz in 2002. Later he was appointed head of the party's branch in Nyíregyháza. He was a candidate for the mayoral seat of Nyíregyháza during the local election in 2006. Later he served as leader of the Fidesz group in the city council.

In the Hungarian Parliament, he served as a member of the Constitutional, Judicial and Standing Orders Committee for a month in 2010. Later he worked in the Committee on European Affairs from June 8, 2010, to February 14, 2011. He was appointed Director of Szabolcs-Szatmár-Bereg County Government Office on January 1, 2011, holding the office until May 5, 2014. He is a member of the Committee on Culture since May 6, 2014. Vinnai is one of the recorders of the National Assembly since July 2, 2018.
