= László Varga (politician, 1979) =

Hungarian jurist and politician (born 1979)

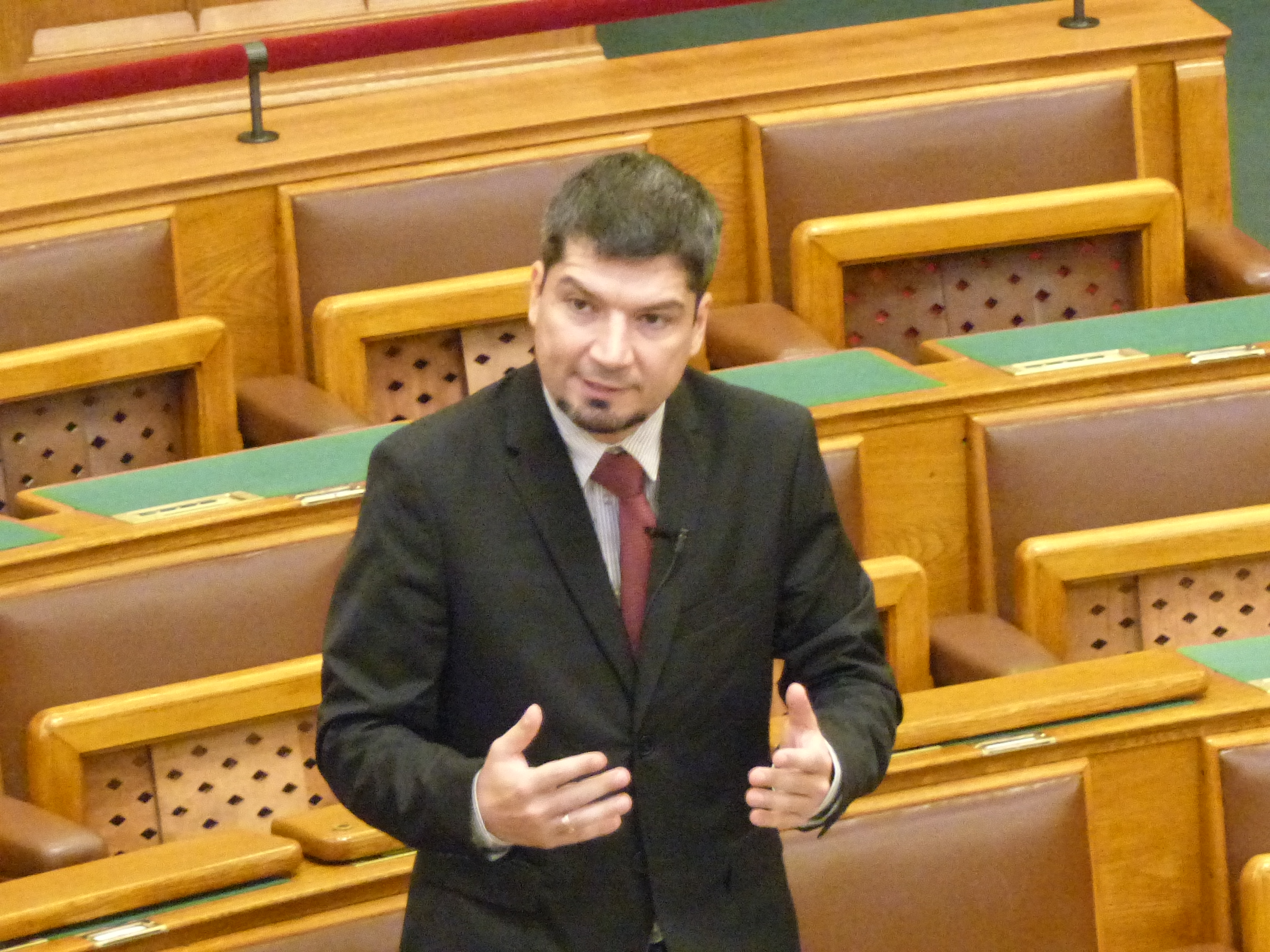

Member of the National Assembly
- In office 15 May 2006 – 1 May 2022

Personal details
- Born: 1 September 1979 (age 47) Miskolc, Hungary
- Party: MSZP (since 1999)
- Children: 2
- Profession: jurist, politician

Dr. László Varga (born 1 September 1979) is a Hungarian jurist and politician, member of the National Assembly from the Hungarian Socialist Party between 2006 and 2022.

== Political career ==
He became a member of the Hungarian Socialist Party and of the Young Left in 1999. In the organisation of the Young Left he was the chairman of the Miskolc municipal branch from 2001, and from 2002 he worked as the deputy chairman of the Borsod-Abaúj-Zemplén County grouping. From 2004 until 2005 he was the President of the National Committee of the Young Left.

In 2002 he won an individual mandate at the local elections in Miskolc. In 2004 he was elected to be the leader of a parliamentary group in the General Assembly of Miskolc. He was member of the Economical Committee, of the Self-made Committee of Public Utility Construction and of the Committee of Public Procurement. From 2001 he has been a member of the presidium of the Hungarian Socialist Party of Miskolc, and from 2004 he has been a member of the presidium in Borsod-Abaúj-Zemplén County. He is working as a legal advisor at present. He is member of the Friends for Football Association in Diósgyőr. He served as Chairman of the Young Left between 2006 and 2008. After the transformation of the organization, he was elected head of the Societas which position held until 2010.

Varga was elected MP in the 2006 parliamentary election from the party's Borsod-Abaúj-Zemplén County Regional List. He was appointed a member of the Committee of Foreign Affairs and Hungarians Beyond the Frontier on 30 May 2006. He secured a mandate in the 2010 parliamentary election from the party's National List. Varga was a member of the Constitutional, Judicial and Standing Orders Committee between 14 November 2011 and 4 March 2013. He was appointed a member of the Committee on Youth, Social, Family, and Housing affairs on 14 May 2010 and Committee on Sport and Tourism. Varga was elected MP for Miskolc (Borsod-Abaúj-Zemplén County Constituency II) during the 2014 parliamentary election. He was a member of the Enterprise Development Committee from 2014 to 2016. He is a member of the Legislative Committee since 2016 and Committee on Legal Affairs since 2018. Varga was defeated as individual MP by Fidesz politician György Hubay in the 2018 parliamentary election, nevertheless he obtained a mandate via his party's national list. He stood as a candidate of United for Hungary in Miskolc constituency during the 2022 parliamentary election and came to the second place behind Fidesz candidate János Kiss. He did not secure a mandate after 16 years.

== Personal life ==
He is married and has two children.
