= Dezső Hiszékeny =

Hungarian politician

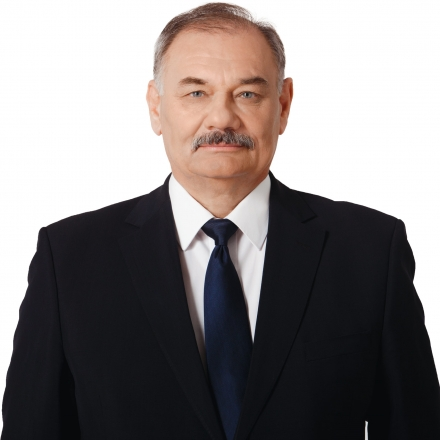

Member of the National Assembly
- In office 6 May 2014 – 8 May 2026
- Constituency: 13th district of Budapest

Personal details
- Born: February 22, 1956 (age 70) Tatabánya
- Citizenship: Hungary
- Party: Hungarian Socialist Party

Dezső Hiszékeny (born in Tatabánya, Hungary on February 22, 1956) is a Hungarian politician. He was a Member of Parliament for the Hungarian Socialist Party from 2014 to 2026 serving at the National Assembly of Hungary. Between 2006 and 2014 he served as the Deputy Mayor of 13th district of Budapest.

== Early life and career ==
He graduated from the Vocational High School of Mechanical Engineering in 1974 and then worked at BRG as a technical manager. He was later employed by the Hungarian Ship and Crane Factory. He graduated from the College of Public Administration in 1988 with a degree in administrative organization. He also worked as an entrepreneur. Since 2014 he has been a Member of Parliament of the Hungarian Socialist Party. From 2006 to 2014, he was the deputy mayor of the 13th district of Budapest.

=== Parliament ===
He was elected member of parliament in the National Assembly of Hungary representing the Budapest 7th constituency between 2014 and 2026. In the Hungarian pre-election of 2021, he contested again in Budapest 7th constituency and won. He was re-elected MP in the 2022 Hungarian parliamentary election. He did not run in the 2026 Hungarian parliamentary election.

== Criminal case ==
In 2013, Hiszékeny was allegedly involved in a bribery case over the lease of a municipal owned business premises. According to the indictment, Hiszékeny asked for HUF5 million for the lease of a municipally owned business premises, but a secret recording obtained by an undercover agent did not support the allegations. The prosecution's accusation is mainly based on the fact that in one conversation with the undercover agent, Hiszékeny nodded when he brought the bribe, while in another conversation, a longer silence showed five fingers showing off the five million bribe. An expert found that the prosecutor's transcript of the audio recordings of the indictment was "incomplete and ambiguous." The charges against him were subsequently dropped.
