= Antal Csárdi =

Hungarian entrepreneur and politician

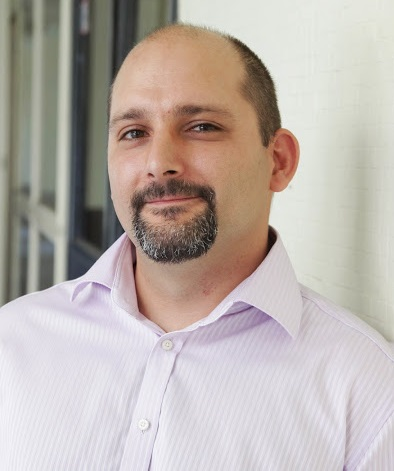
Antal Csárdi 2013-07-27

Antal Csárdi (born in Budapest on 8 November 1976) is a Hungarian entrepreneur and politician. He was a member of National Assembly of Hungary from 2018 to 2026. In the 2018 parliamentary election he was elected a member of the National Assembly, and he served as the individual Member of Parliament for the Downtown, Castle District and partly Ferencváros and Józsefváros.
