= List of cities and towns of Hungary =

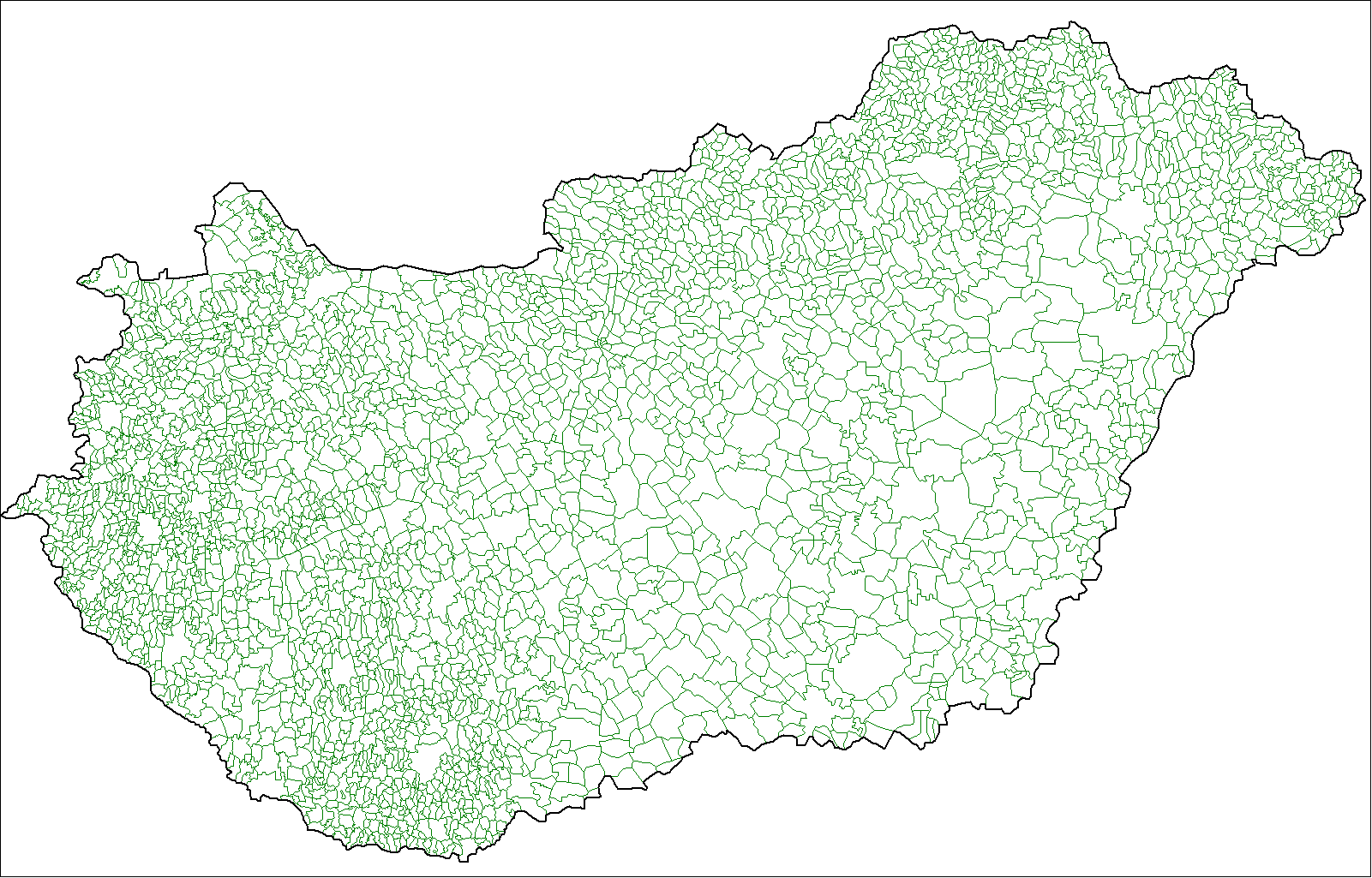
Towns and villages in Hungary

Hungary has 3,152 municipalities as of July 15, 2013: 346 towns (Hungarian term: város [ˈvaːroʃ], plural: városok [ˈvaːroʃok]; the terminology does not distinguish between cities and towns – the term town is used in official translations) and 2,806 villages (Hungarian: község [ˈkøʃːeːɡ], plural: községek [ˈkøʃːeːɡɛk]) of which 126 are classified as large villages (Hungarian: nagyközség [ˈnɒckøʃːeːɡ], plural: nagyközségek). The number of towns can change, since villages can be elevated to town status by act of the President. The capital Budapest has a special status and is not included in any county while 25 of the towns are so-called cities with county rights. All county seats except Budapest are cities with county rights.

Four of the cities (Budapest, Miskolc, Győr, and Pécs) have agglomerations, and the Hungarian Statistical Office distinguishes seventeen other areas in earlier stages of agglomeration development.

The largest city is the capital, Budapest, while the smallest town is Pálháza with 1038 inhabitants (2010). The largest village is Solymár (population: 10,123 as of 2010). There are more than 100 villages with fewer than 100 inhabitants while the smallest villages have fewer than 20 inhabitants.

== Largest cities in Hungary ==
County seat. Note that there is a total of 19 counties of Hungary + Budapest - the capital Budapest doubles as a county (called Budapest or Budapest város) and the seat of the separate Pest County (Pest vármegye) which surrounds Budapest but does not actually include the capital city.

Bold: City with county rights.
Italics: Capital city.

=== Over 100,000 (large cities) ===
	City / town	County	Population				Peak population	Metropolitan area (2026)
	City / town	County	1949 Census	1990 Census	2011 Census	2022 Census	Peak population	Metropolitan area (2026)
1.	Budapest	Budapest (Pest)	1,590,316	2,016,681	1,733,685	1,685,342 ▼	2,113,034 (1989)	2,589,025
2.	**Debrecen**	Hajdú-Bihar	115,399	212,235	211,340	199,858 ▼	217,706 (1994)	269,020
3.	**Szeged**	Csongrád-Csanád	104,867	175,301	168,048	158,797 ▼	178,878 (1994)	202,213
4.	**Miskolc**	Borsod-Abaúj-Zemplén	109,841	196,442	167,754	147,533 ▼	211,345 (1985)	208,775
5.	**Pécs**	Baranya	89,470	170,039	156,049	139,330 ▼	172,177 (1994)	173,897
6.	**Győr**	Győr-Moson-Sopron	69,583	129,331	129,527	127,599 ▼	132,489 (2020)	227,812
7.	**Nyíregyháza**	Szabolcs-Szatmár-Bereg	56,334	114,152	119,746	116,282 ▼	119,746 (2011)	149,756
8.	**Kecskemét**	Bács-Kiskun	61,730	102,516	111,411	108,120 ▼	112,641 (2016)	168,124

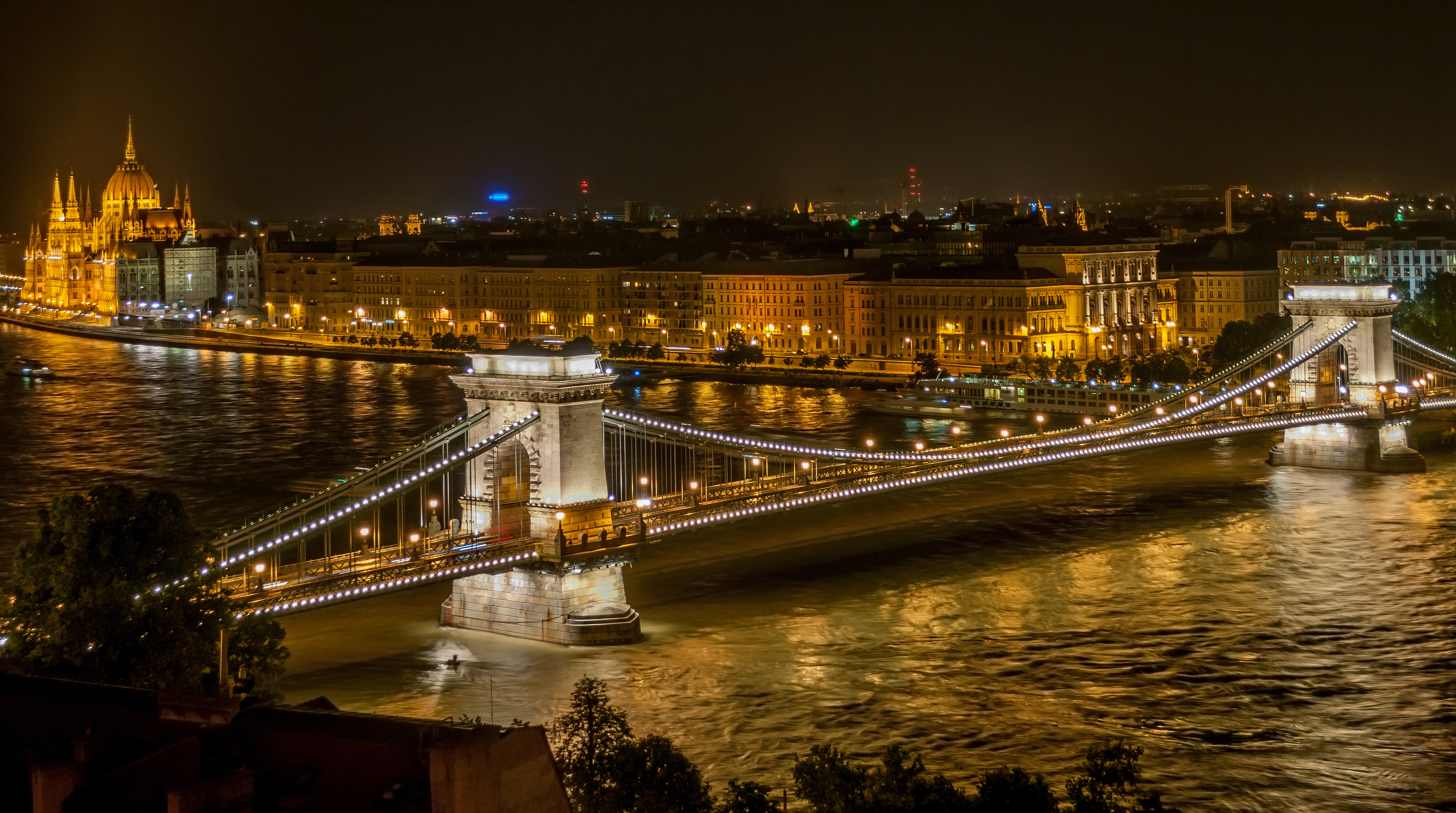
Budapest

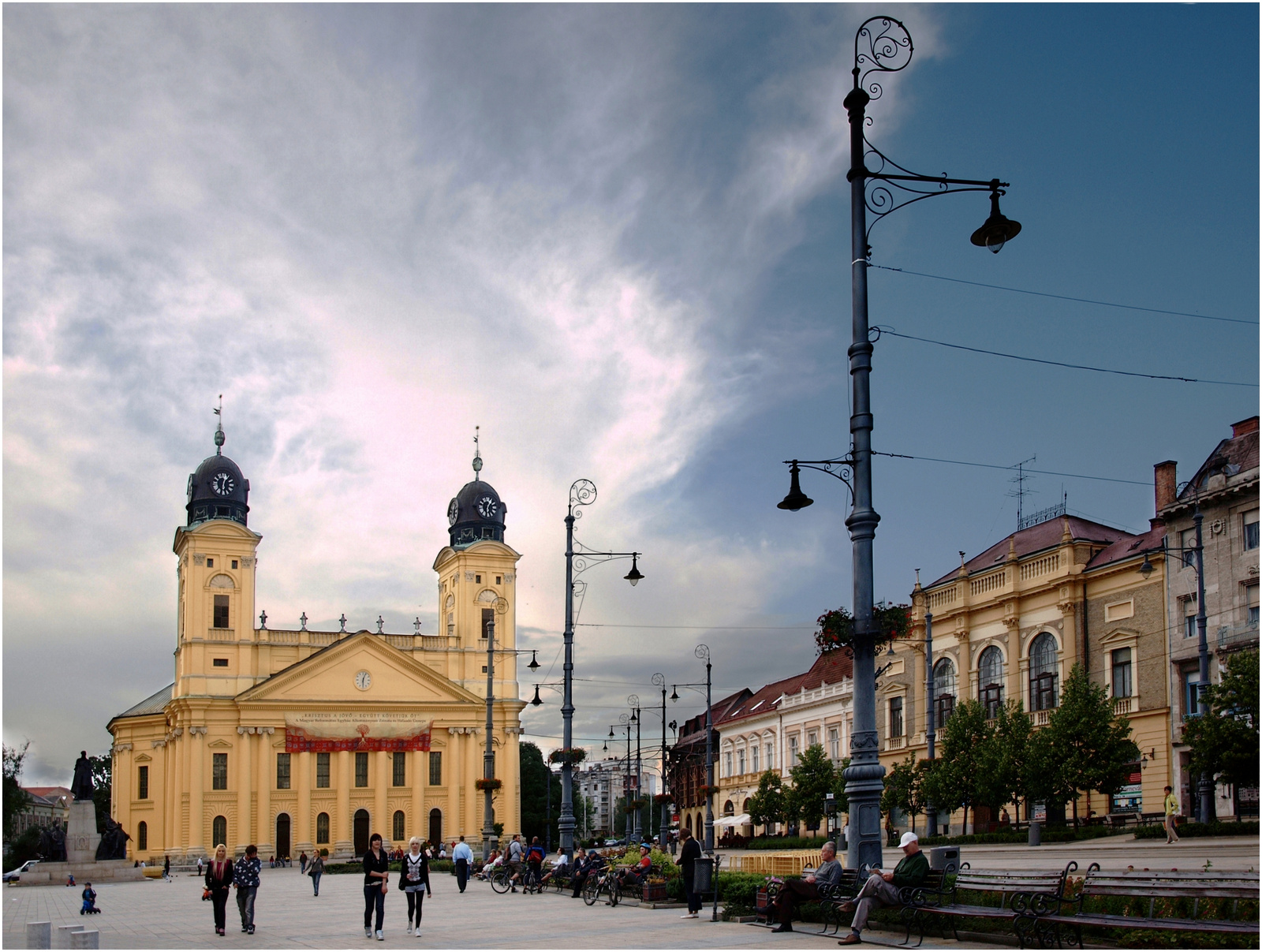
Debrecen

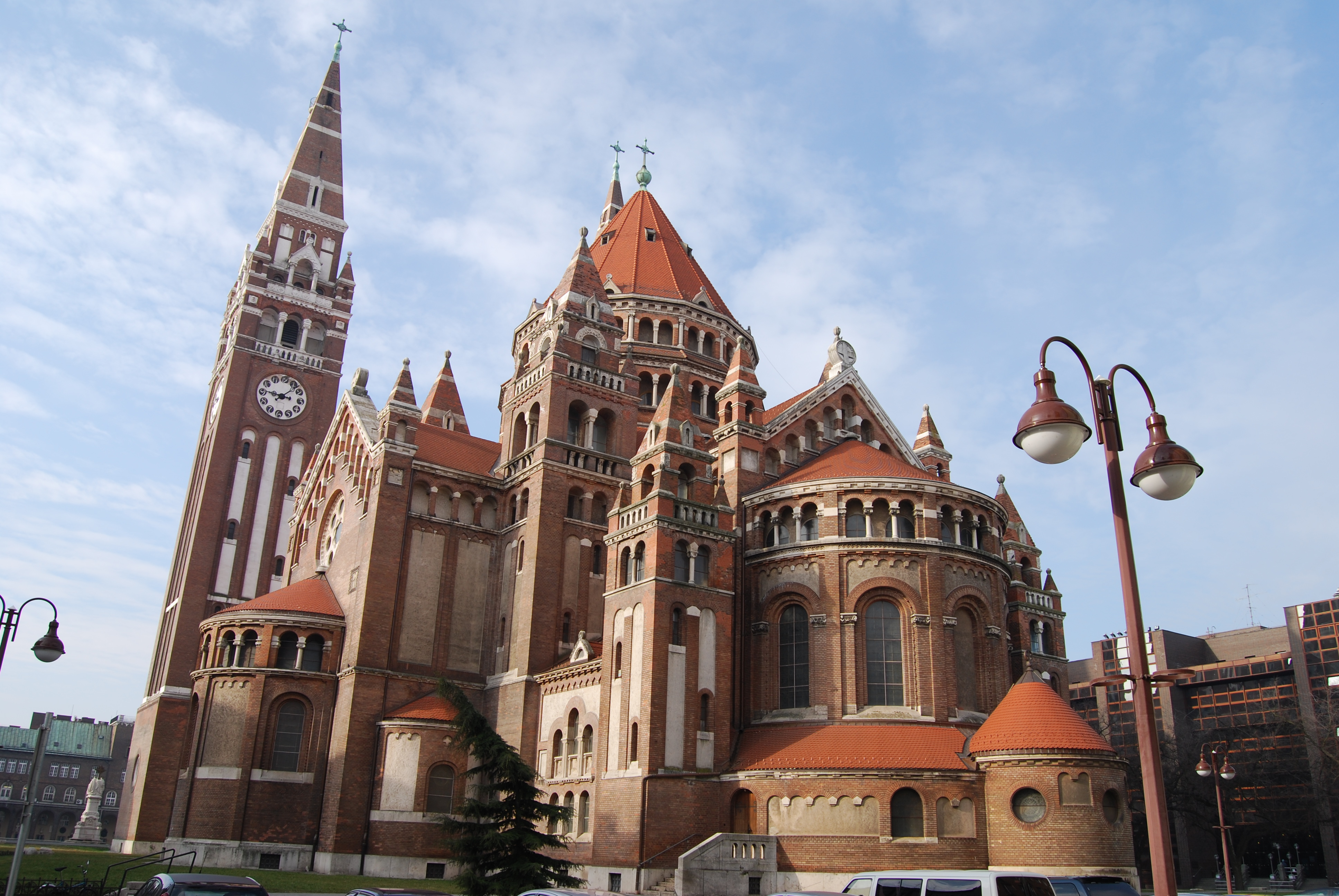
Szeged

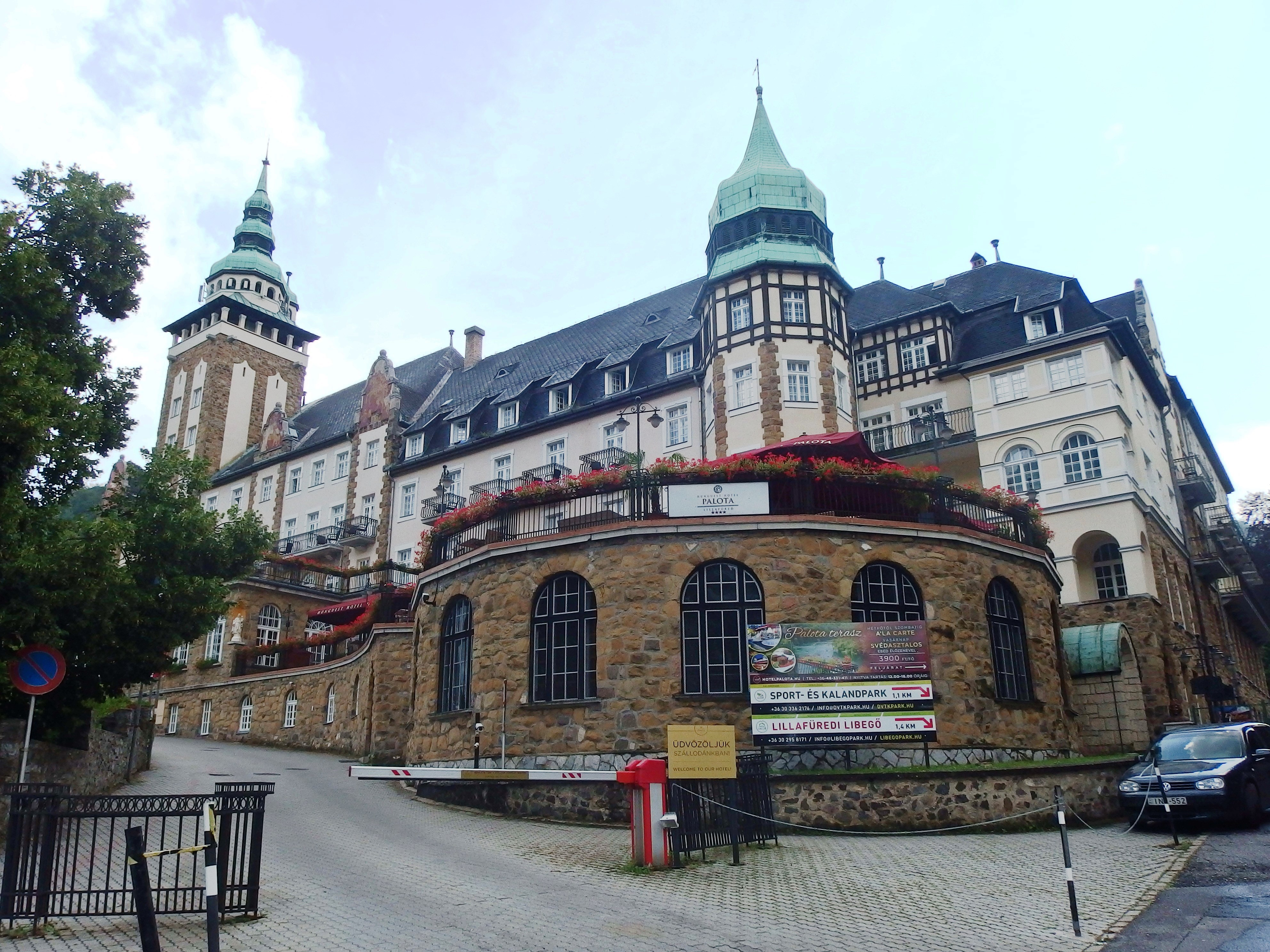
Miskolc

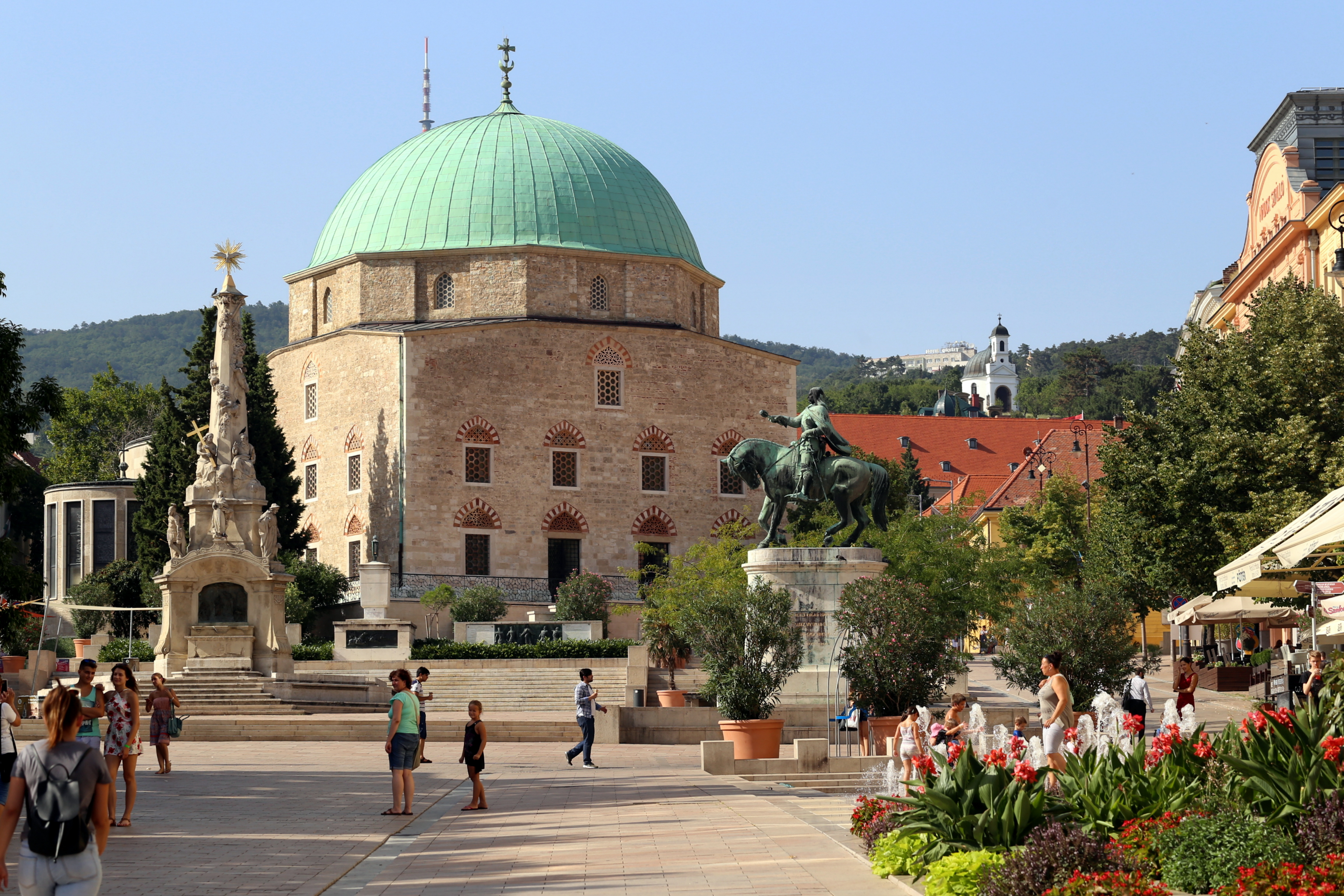
Pécs

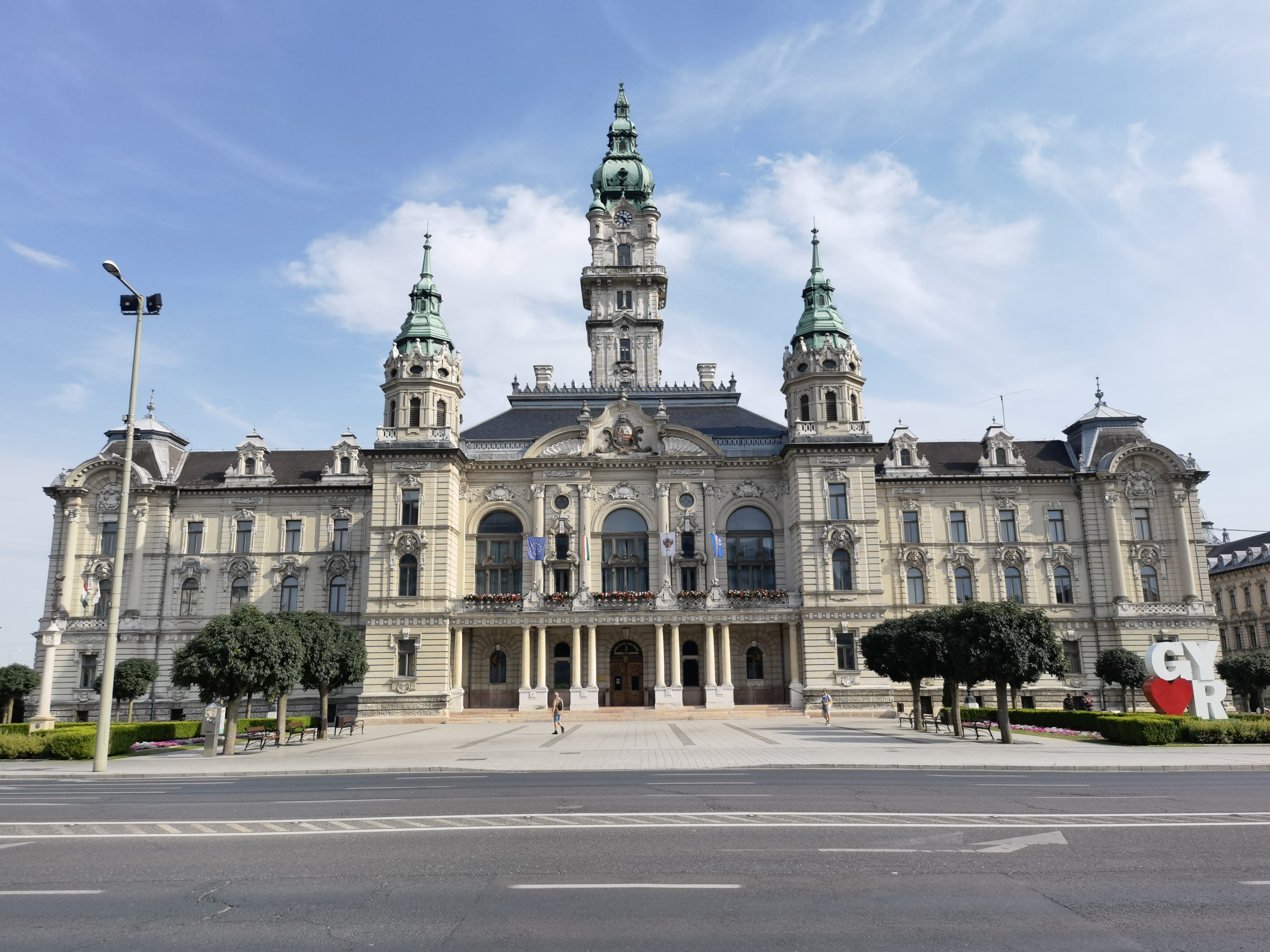
Győr

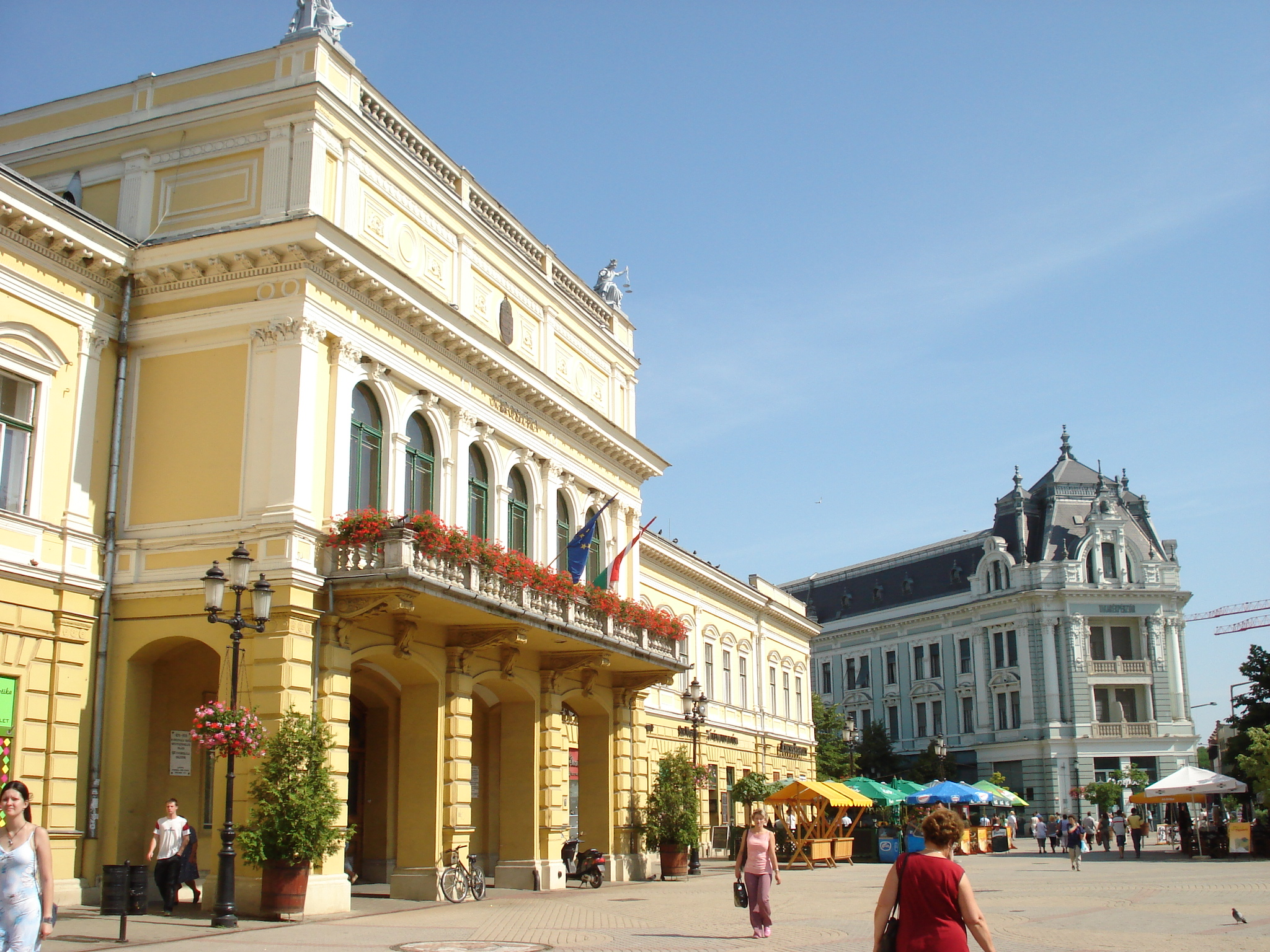
Nyíregyháza

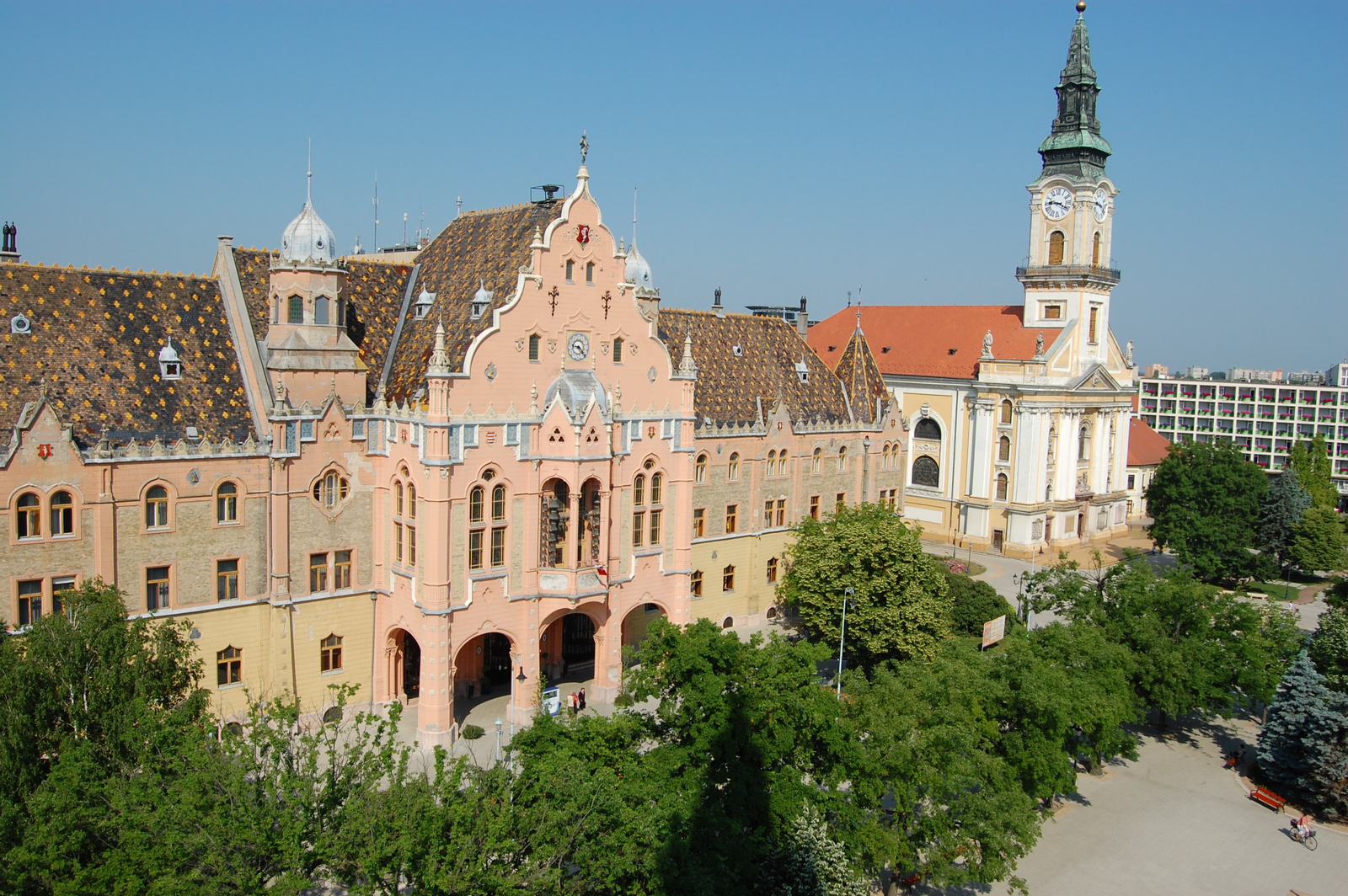
Kecskemét

=== 50,000–100,000 (medium-sized cities) ===
	City / town	County	Population				Peak population	Metropolitan area (2026)
	City / town	County	1949 Census	1990 Census	2011 Census	2022 Census	Peak population	Metropolitan area (2026)
9.	Székesfehérvár	Fejér	42,260	108,958	100,570	95,045 ▼	109,762 (1993)	145,172
10.	Szombathely	Vas	47,589	85,617	78,884	78,190 ▼	85,932 (1994)	107,098
11.	Érd	Pest	16,444	43,327	63,631	71,253 ▲	71,613 (2026)	Budapest
12.	Szolnok	Jász-Nagykun-Szolnok	37,520	78,328	72,953	66,061 ▼	80,859 (1994)	97,574
13.	Tatabánya	Komárom-Esztergom	40,221	74,277	67,753	65,830 ▼	75,921 (1980)	-
14.	Sopron	Győr-Moson-Sopron	36,506	55,083	60,548	60,334 ▼	62,967 (2020)	-
15.	Kaposvár	Somogy	37,945	71,788	66,245	59,397 ▼	74,101 (1979)	-
16.	Békéscsaba	Békés	44,053	67,157	62,050	55,164 ▼	68,044 (1980)	-
17.	Veszprém	Veszprém	20,682	63,867	61,721	55,910 ▼	65,789 (1994)	-
18.	Zalaegerszeg	Zala	21,668	62,212	59,499	54,428 ▼	62,908 (1994)	-

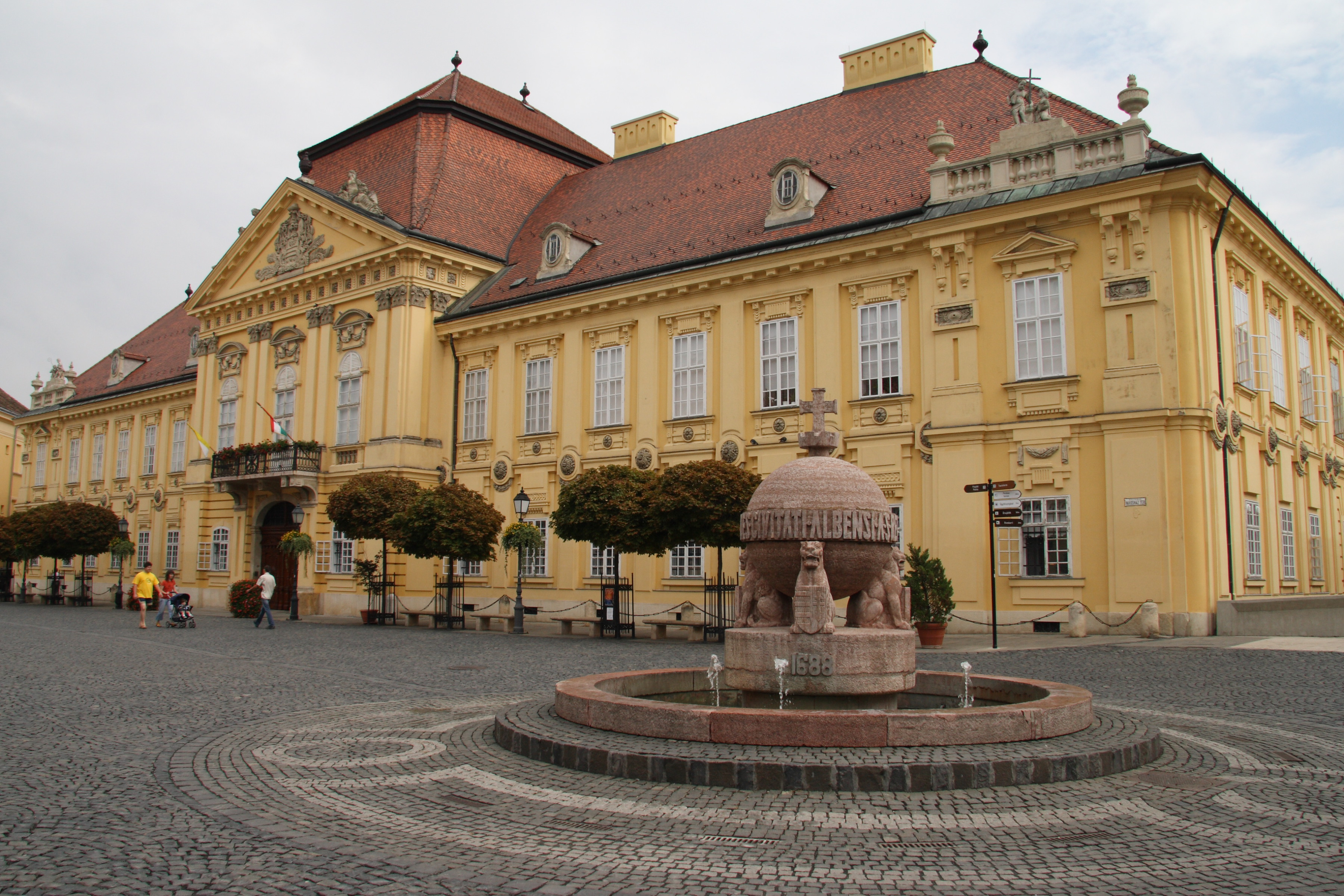
Székesfehérvár

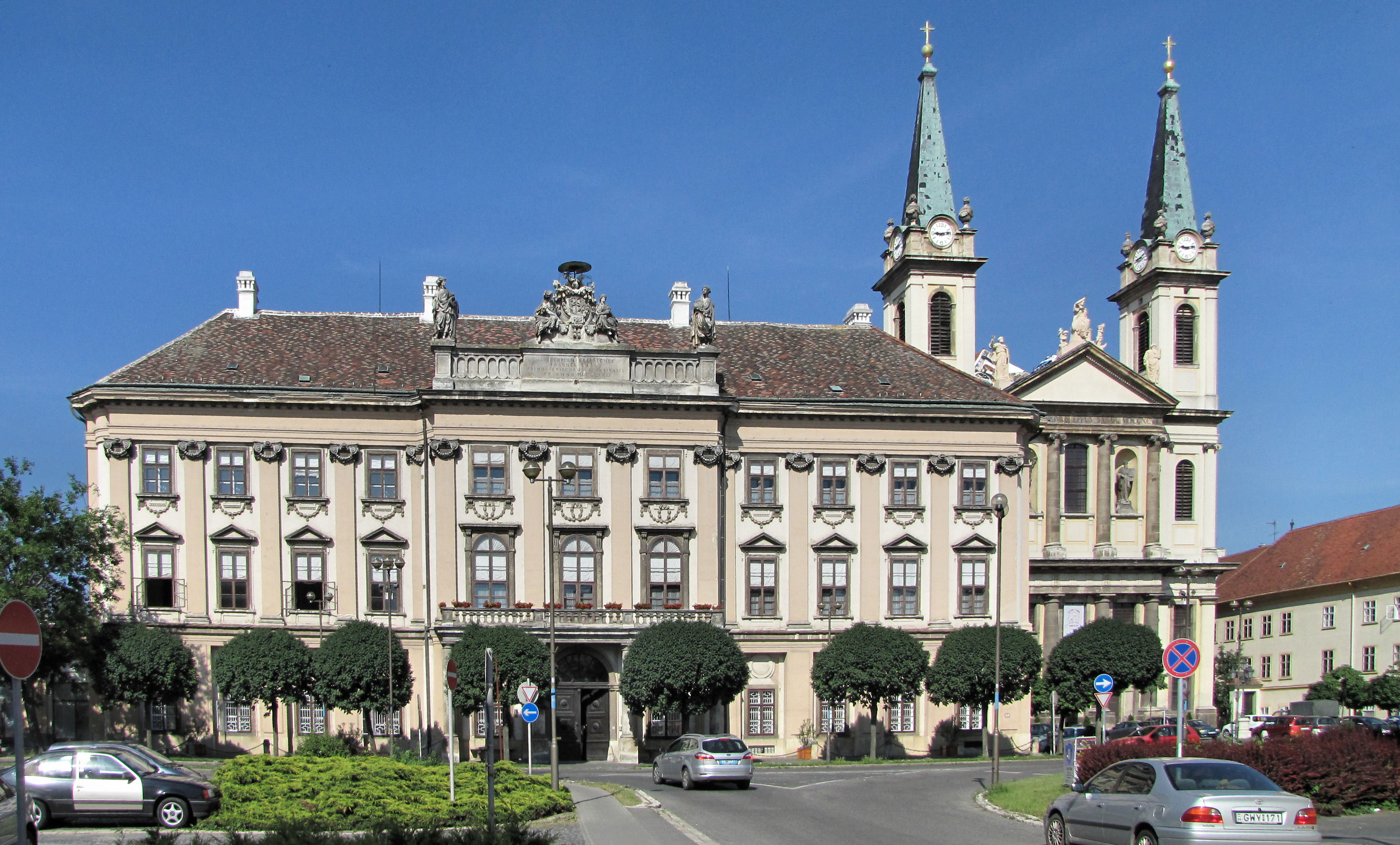
Szombathely

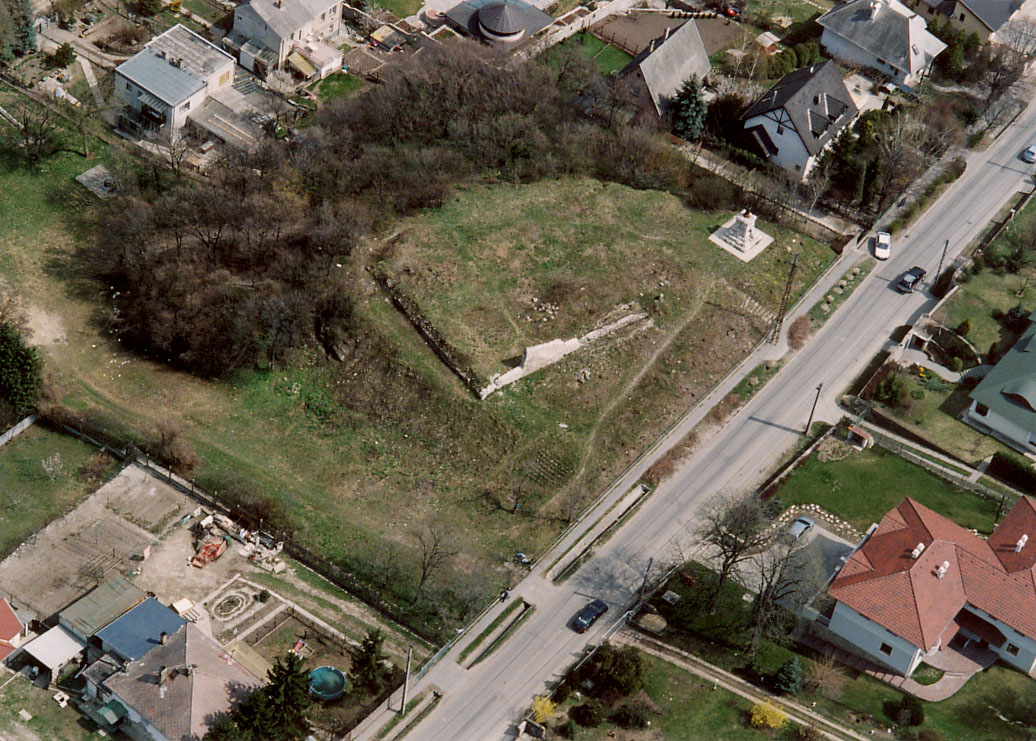
Érd

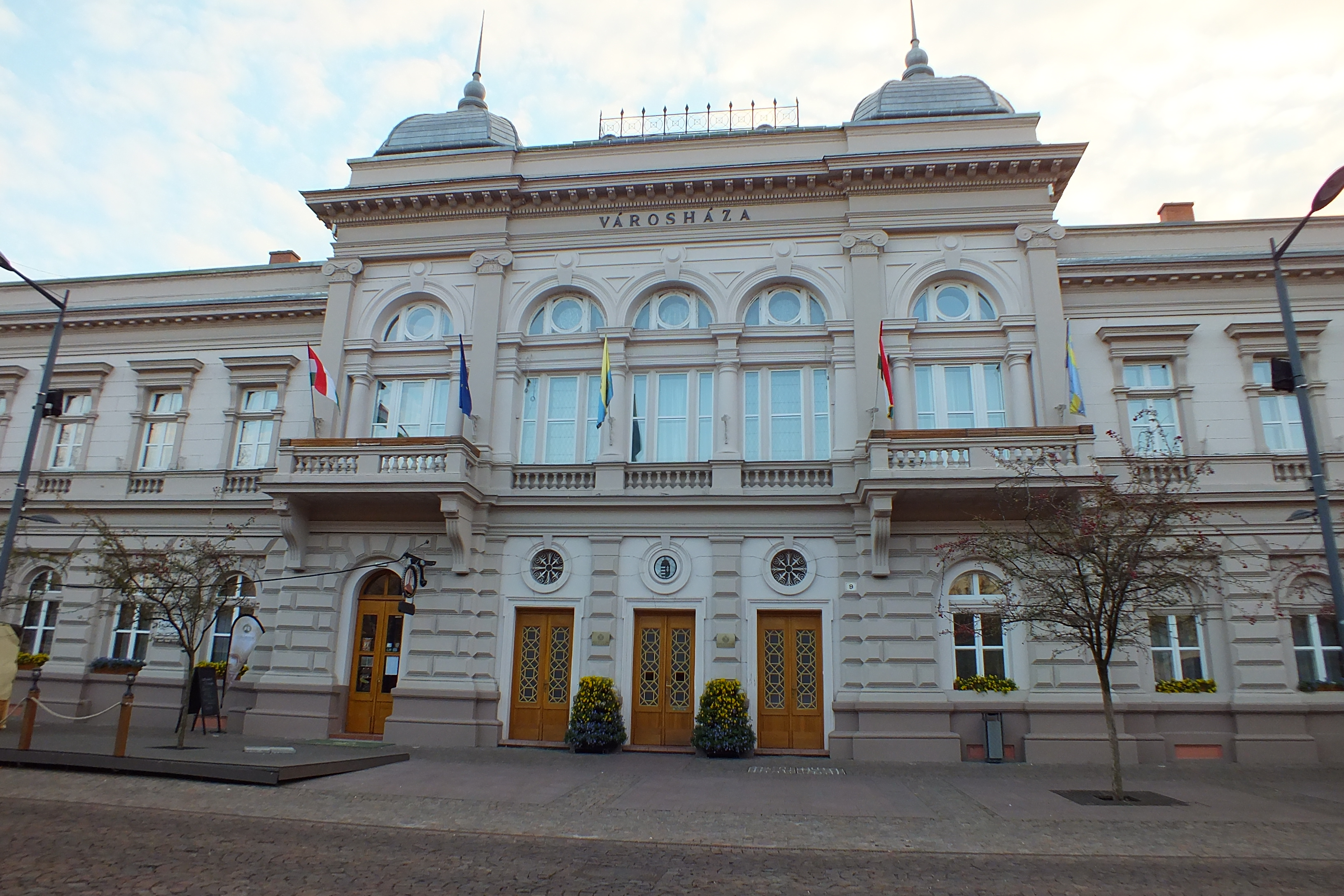
Szolnok

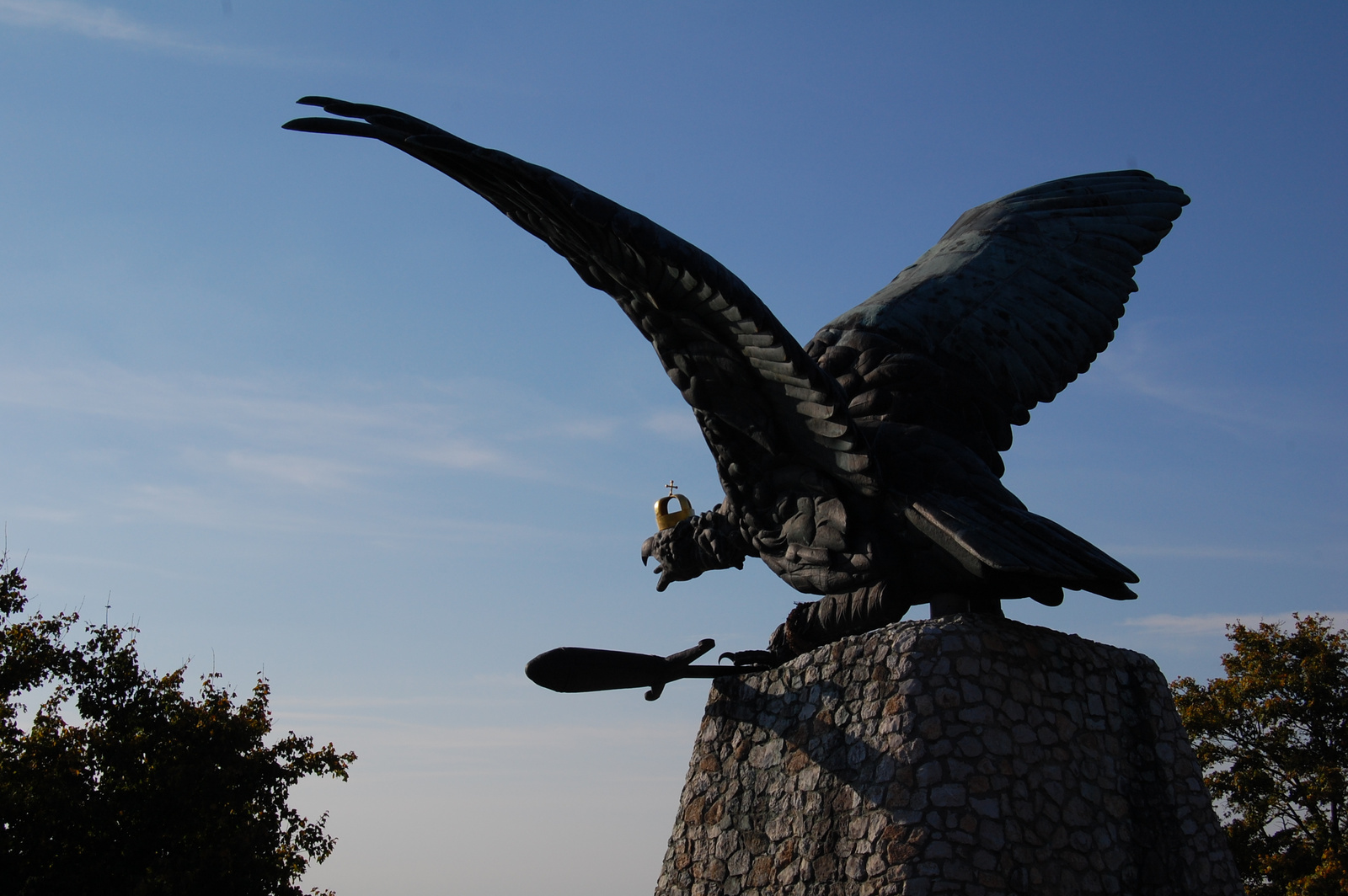
Tatabánya

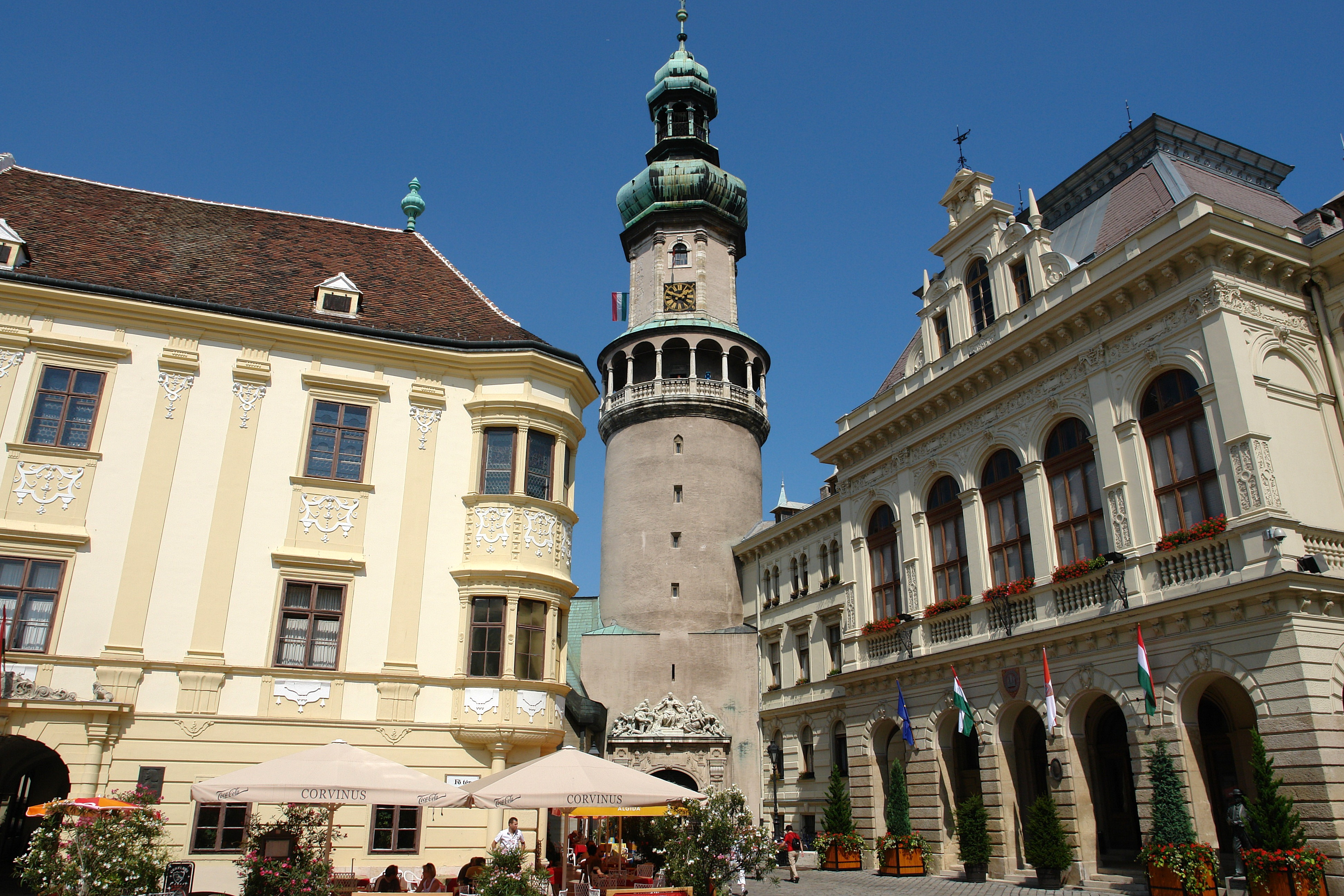
Sopron

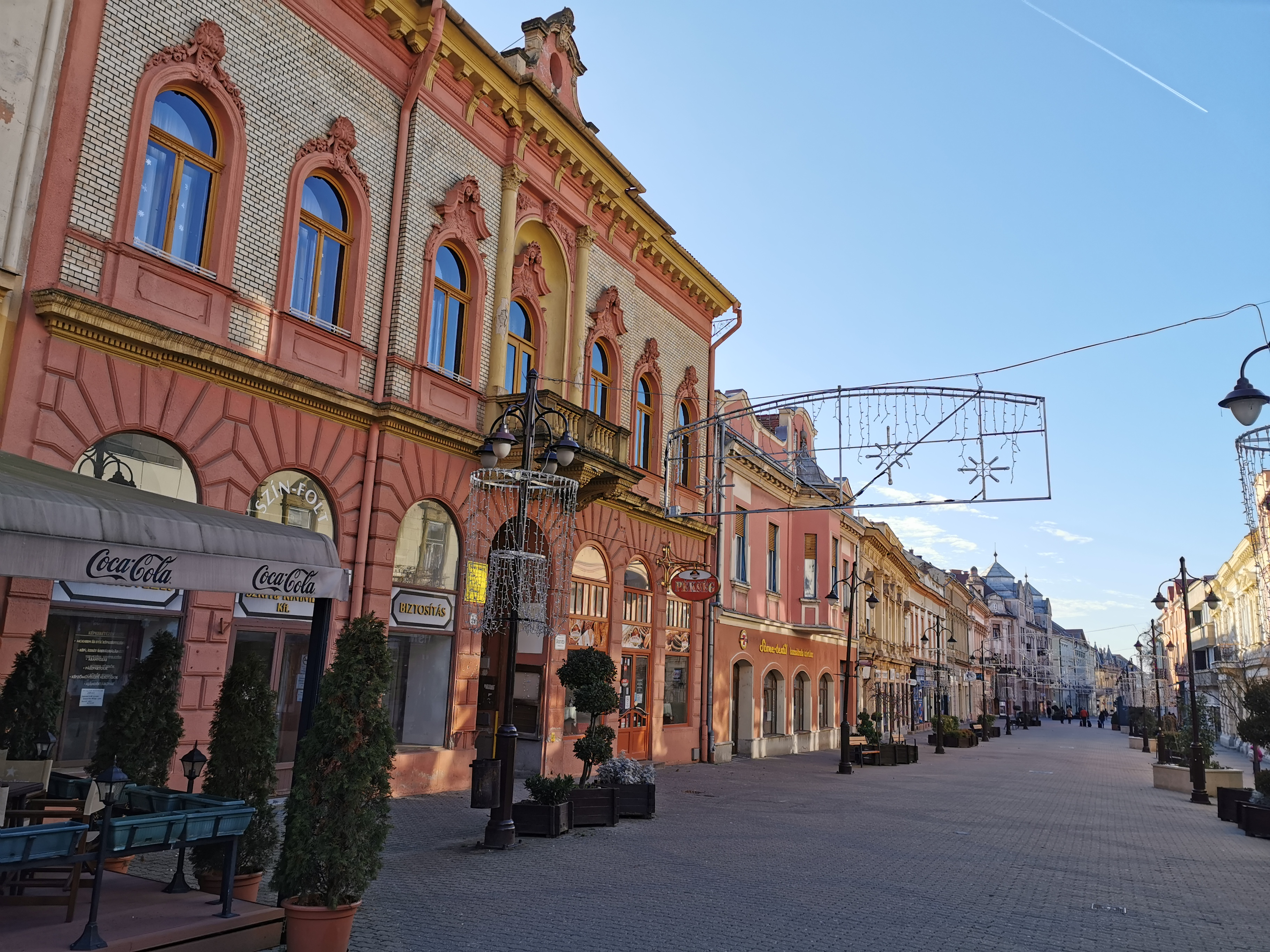
Kaposvár

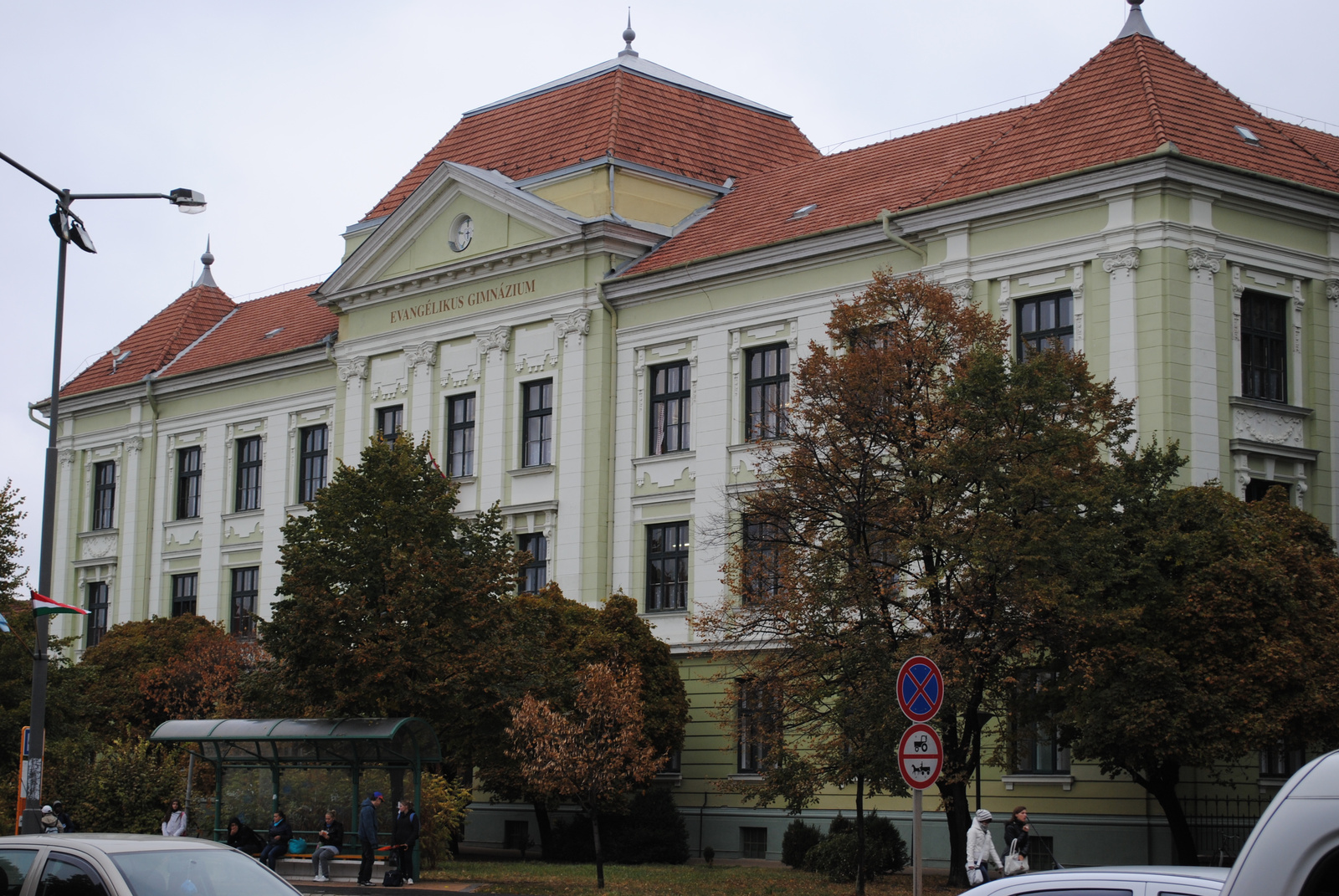
Békéscsaba

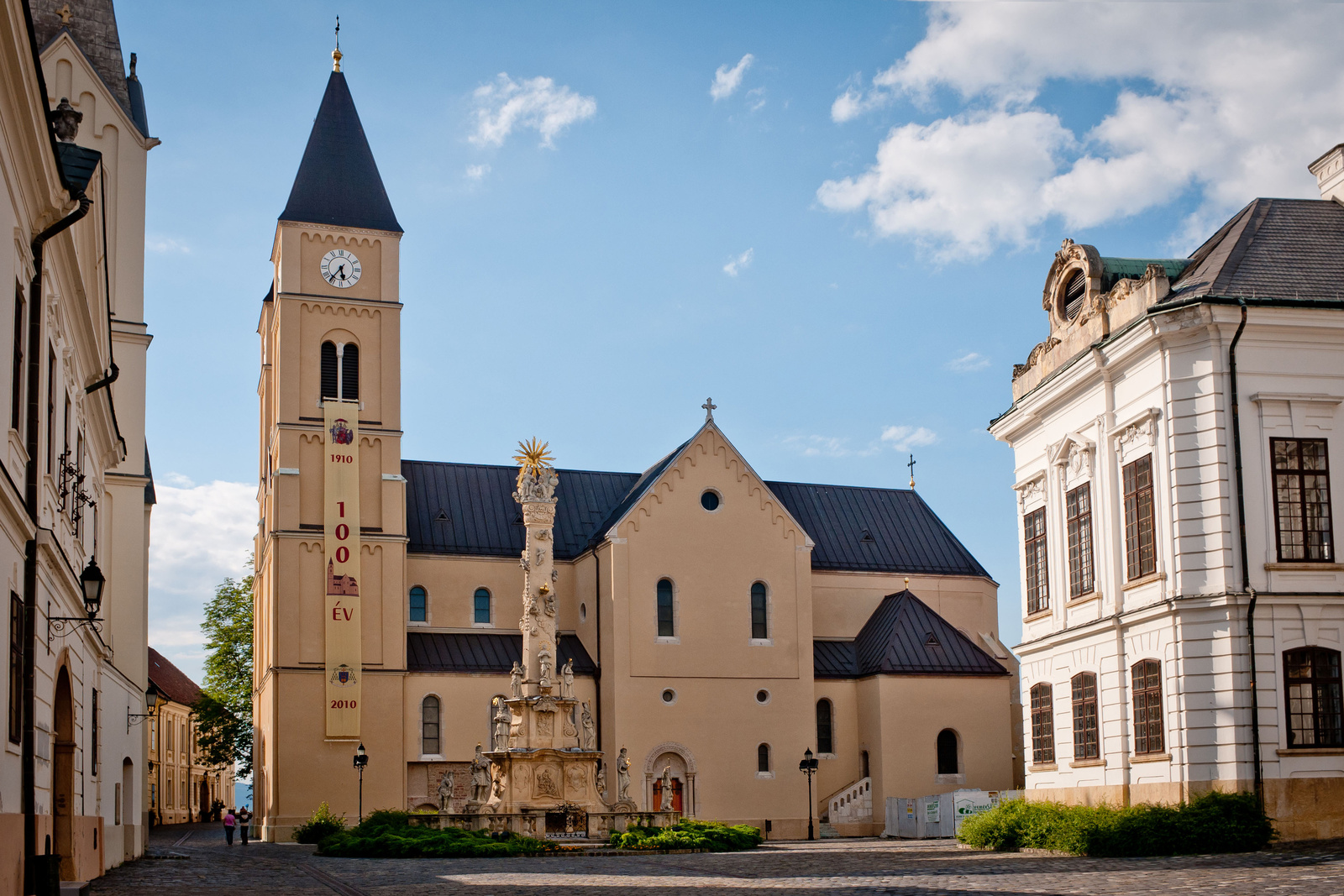
Veszprém

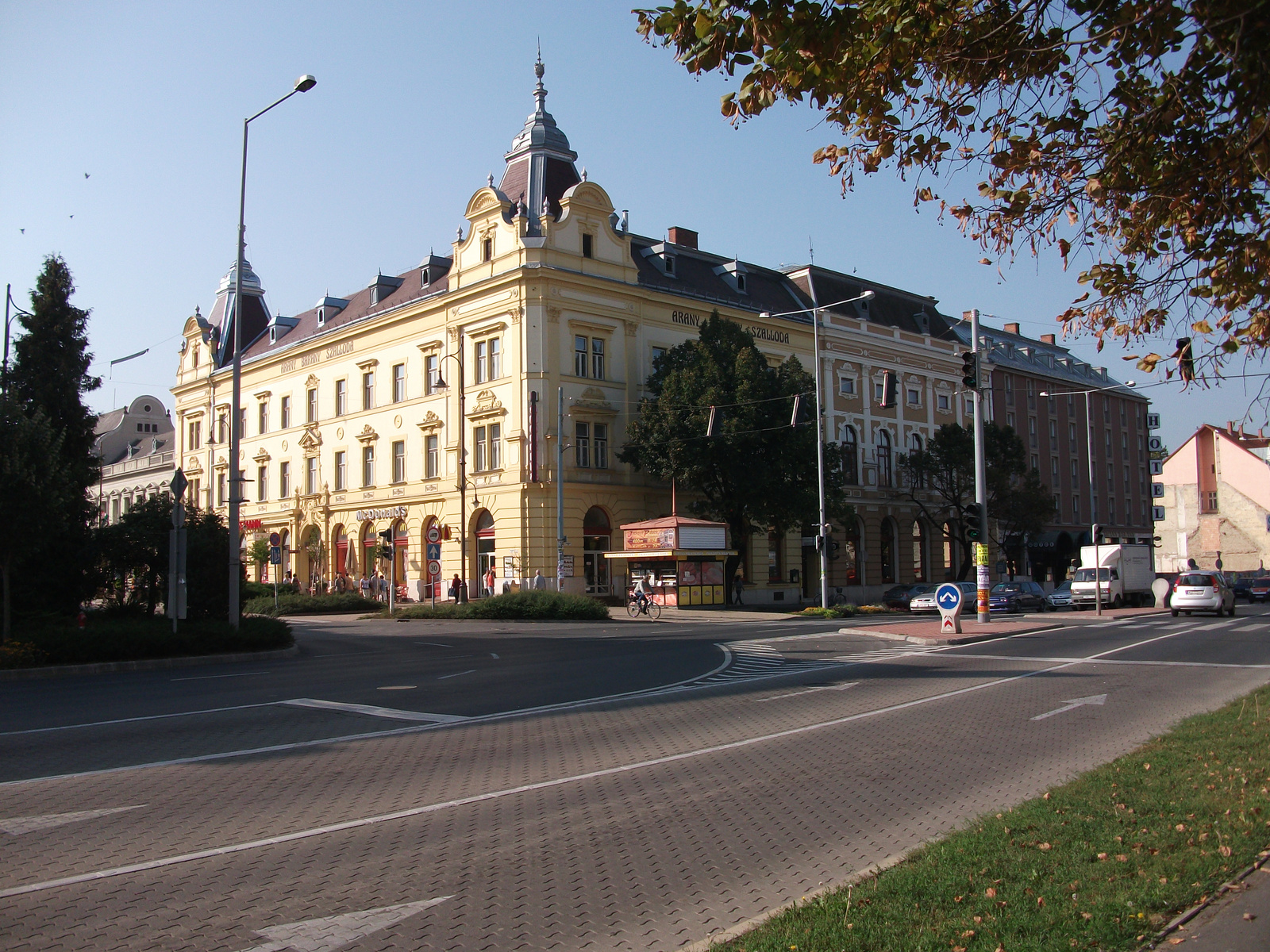
Zalaegerszeg

=== 50,000–30,000 ===
	City / town	County	Population			Top population	Metropolitan area (2021)
	City / town	County	1949 Census	2011 Census	2022 Census	Top population	Metropolitan area (2021)
19.	**Eger**	Heves	32,352	56,569	49,128 ▼	63,794 (1994)	-
20.	**Nagykanizsa**	Zala	33,158	49,026	43,228 ▼	54,052 (1990)	-
21.	Dunakeszi	Pest	11,029	40,545	43,858 ▲	43,990 (2021)	Budapest
22.	**Hódmezővásárhely**	Csongrád-Csanád	49,417	46,047	41,634 ▼	54,486 (1980)	Szeged
23.	**Dunaújváros**	Fejér	3,949	48,484	42,099 ▼	60,736 (1980)	-
24.	Szigetszentmiklós	Pest	5,865	34,708	40,678 ▲	40,679 (2022)	Budapest
25.	Cegléd	Pest	35,237	36,645	36,200 ▼	40,644 (1980)	-
26.	Vác	Pest	21,287	33,831	34,449 ▲	34,866 (1980)	Budapest
27.	Mosonmagyaróvár	Győr-Moson-Sopron	16,546	32,004	33,935 ▲	34,439 (2021)	-
28.	**Baja**	Bács-Kiskun	27,936	36,267	33,140 ▼	39,822 (1994)	-
29.	Gödöllő	Pest	12,216	32,522	32,625 ▲	32,625 (2022)	Budapest
30.	**Salgótarján**	Nógrád	32,571	37,262	31,312 ▼	50,120 (1980)	-
31.	Ózd	Borsod-Abaúj-Zemplén	29,184	34,481	31,022 ▼	48,636 (1981)	-

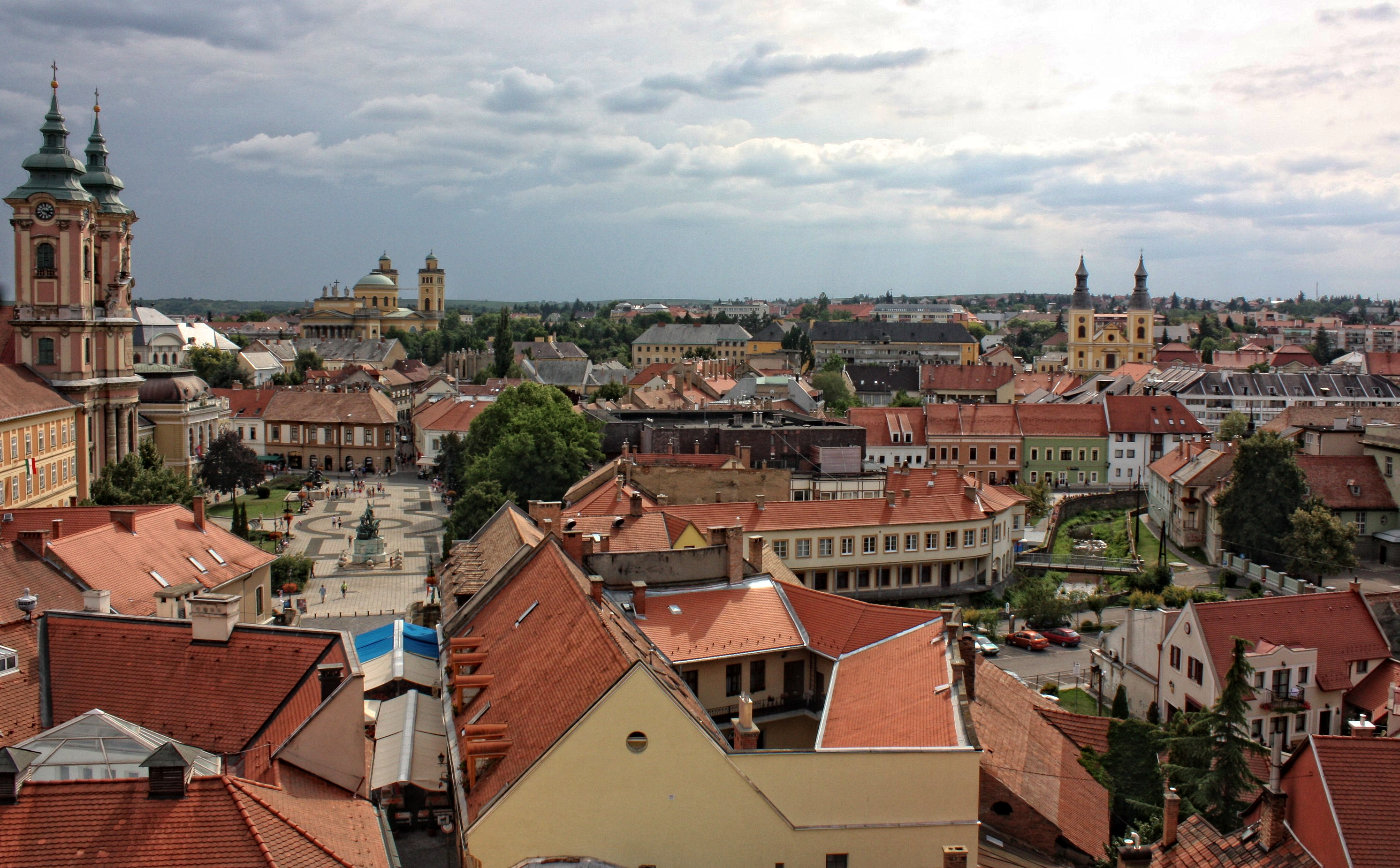
Eger

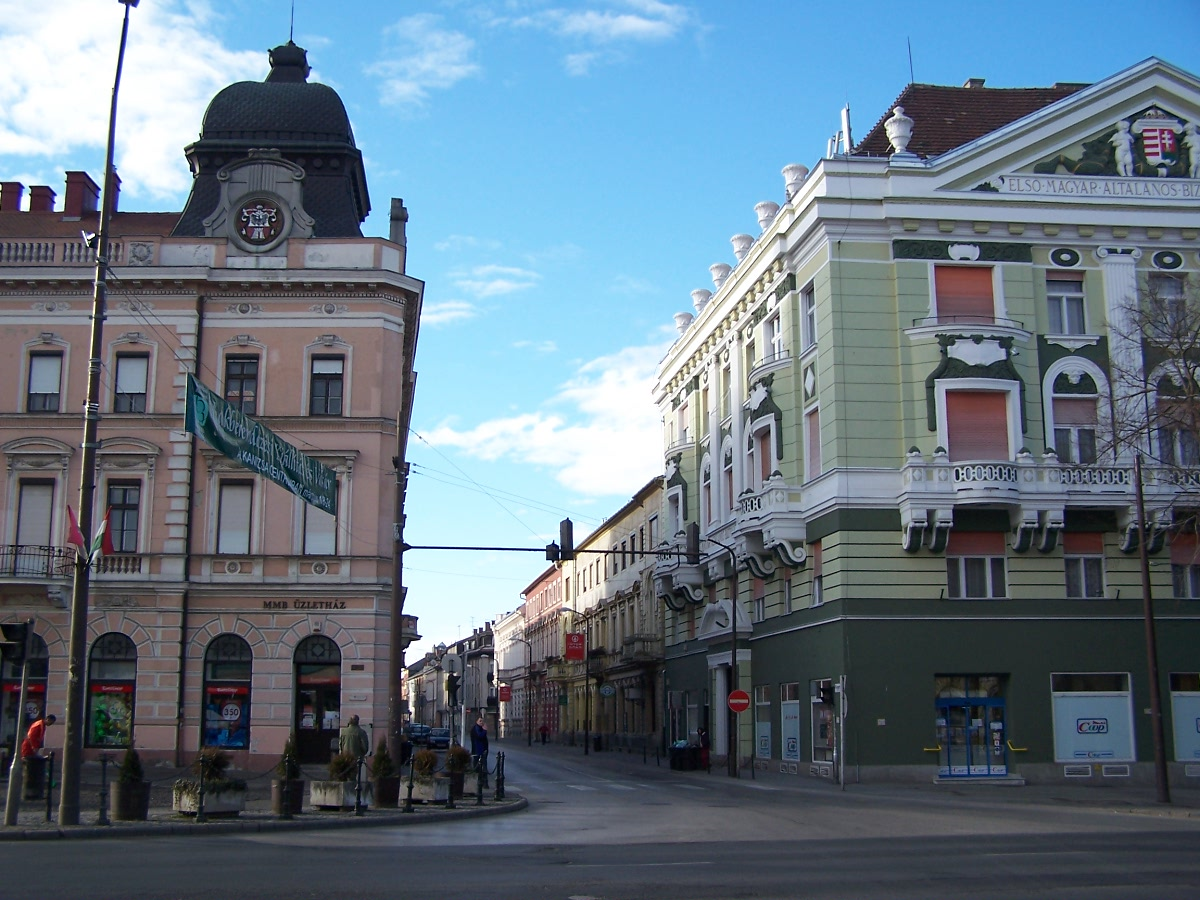
Nagykanizsa

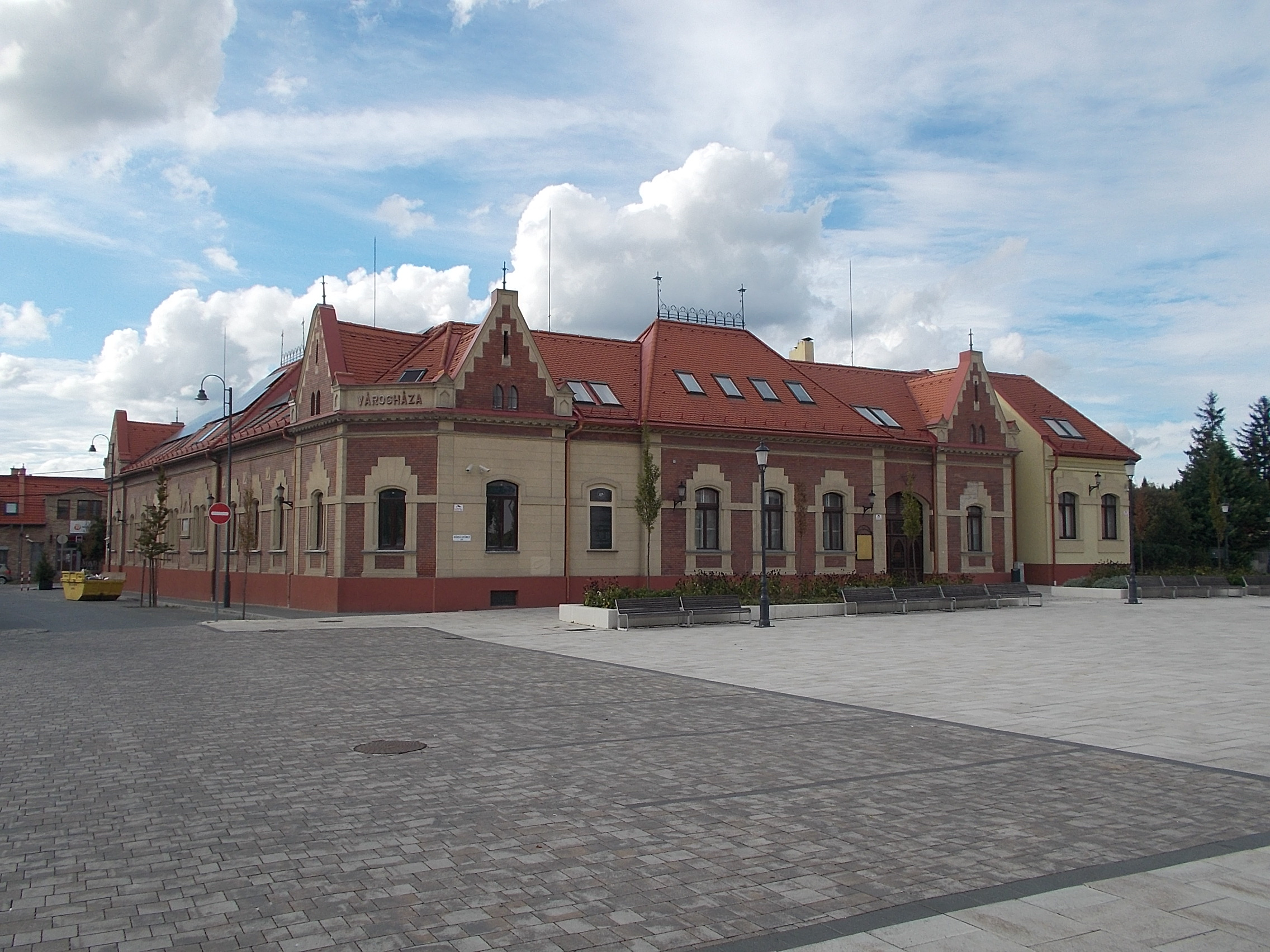
Dunakeszi

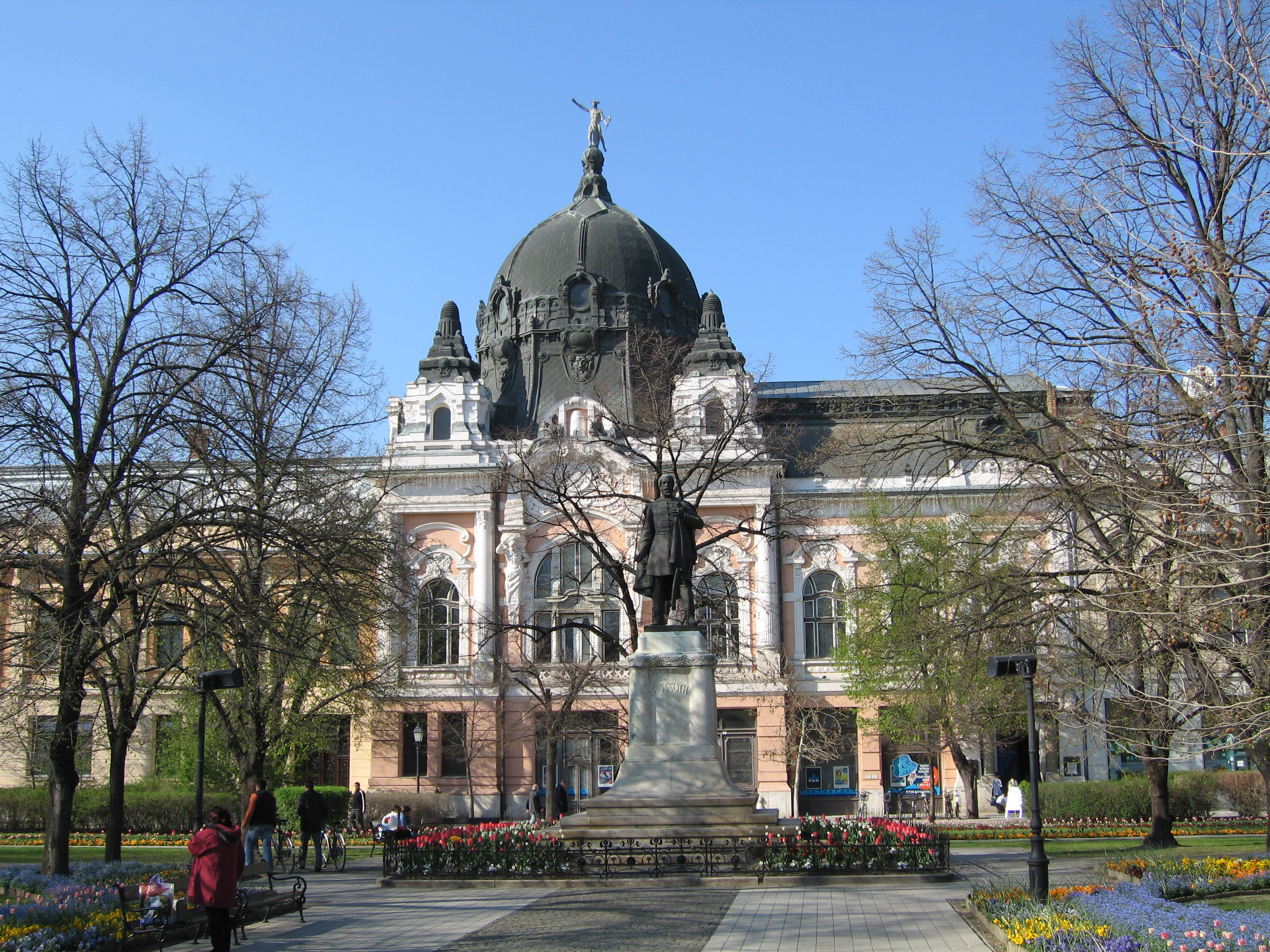
Hódmezővásárhely

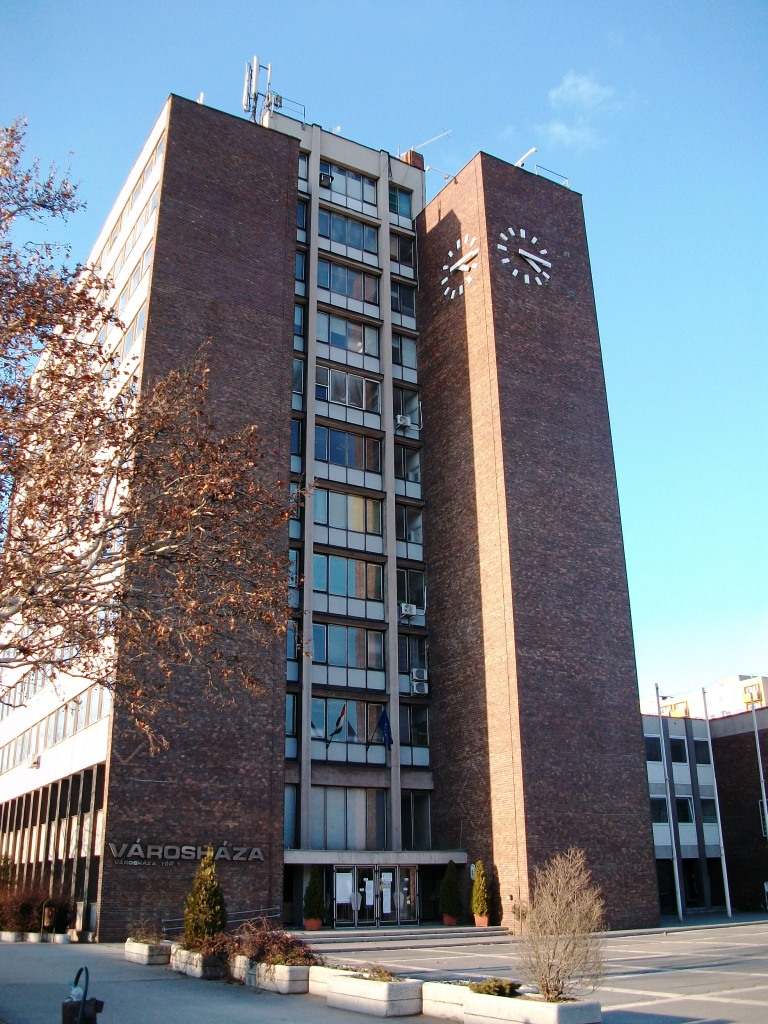
Dunaújváros

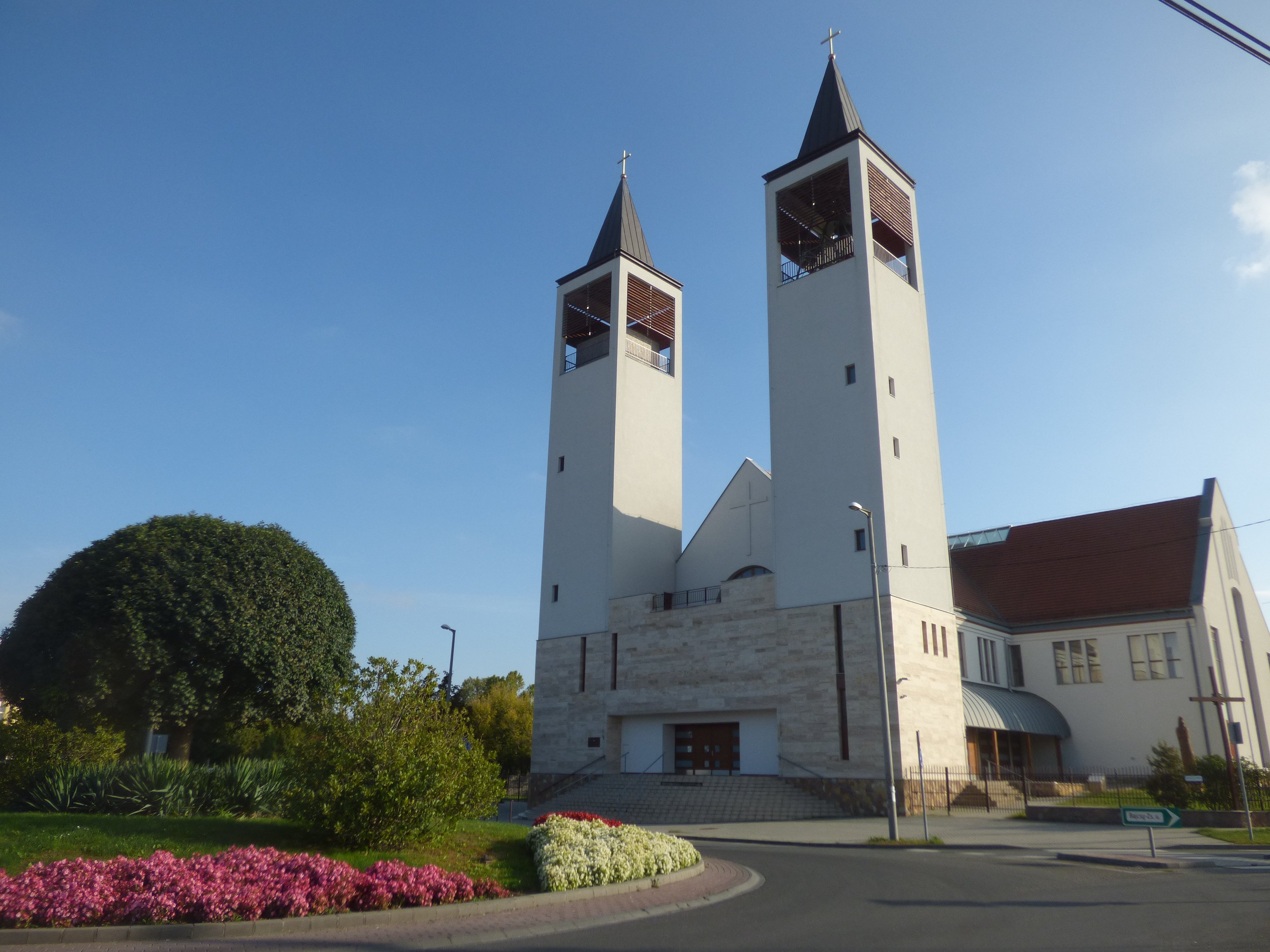
Szigetszentmiklós

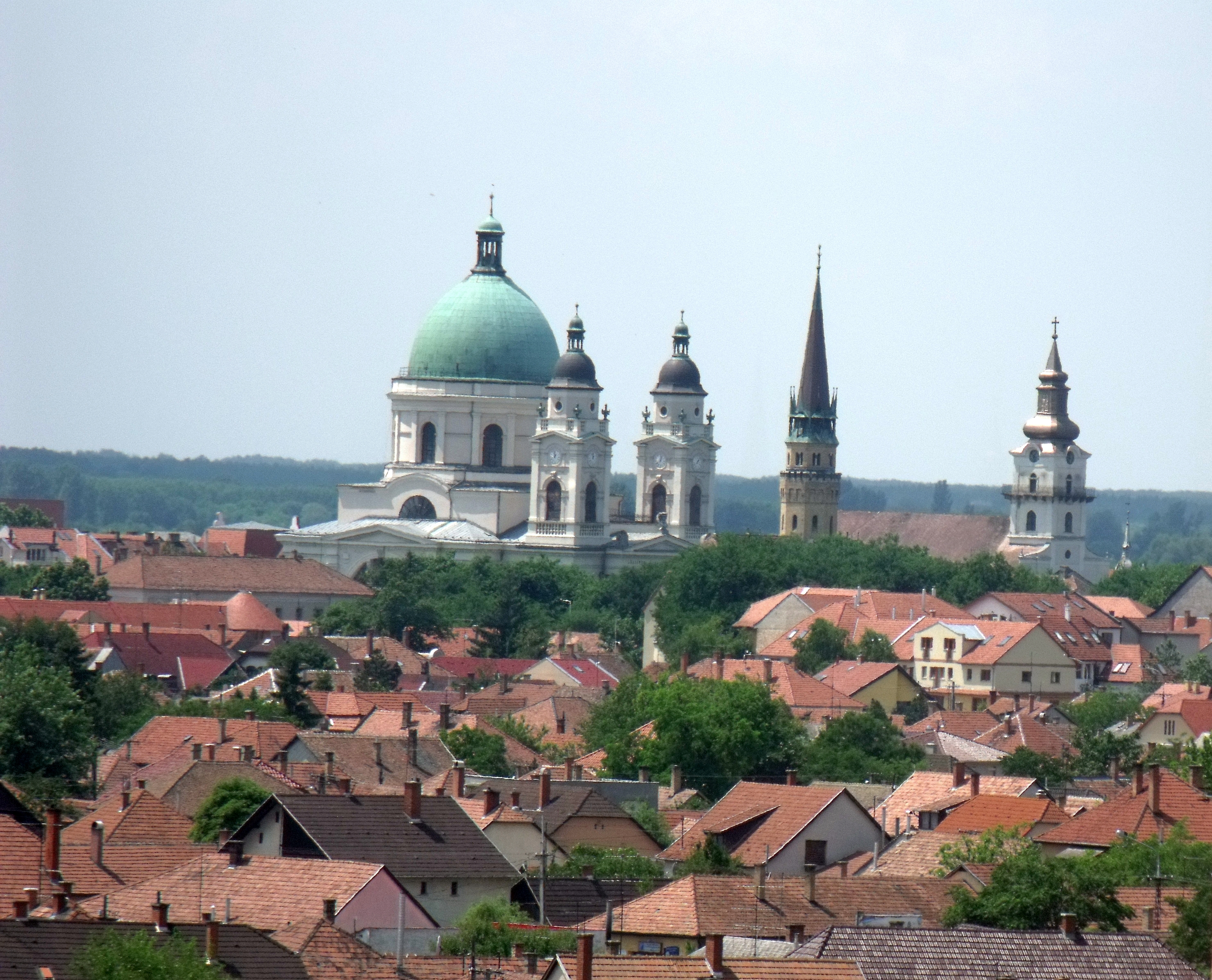
Cegléd

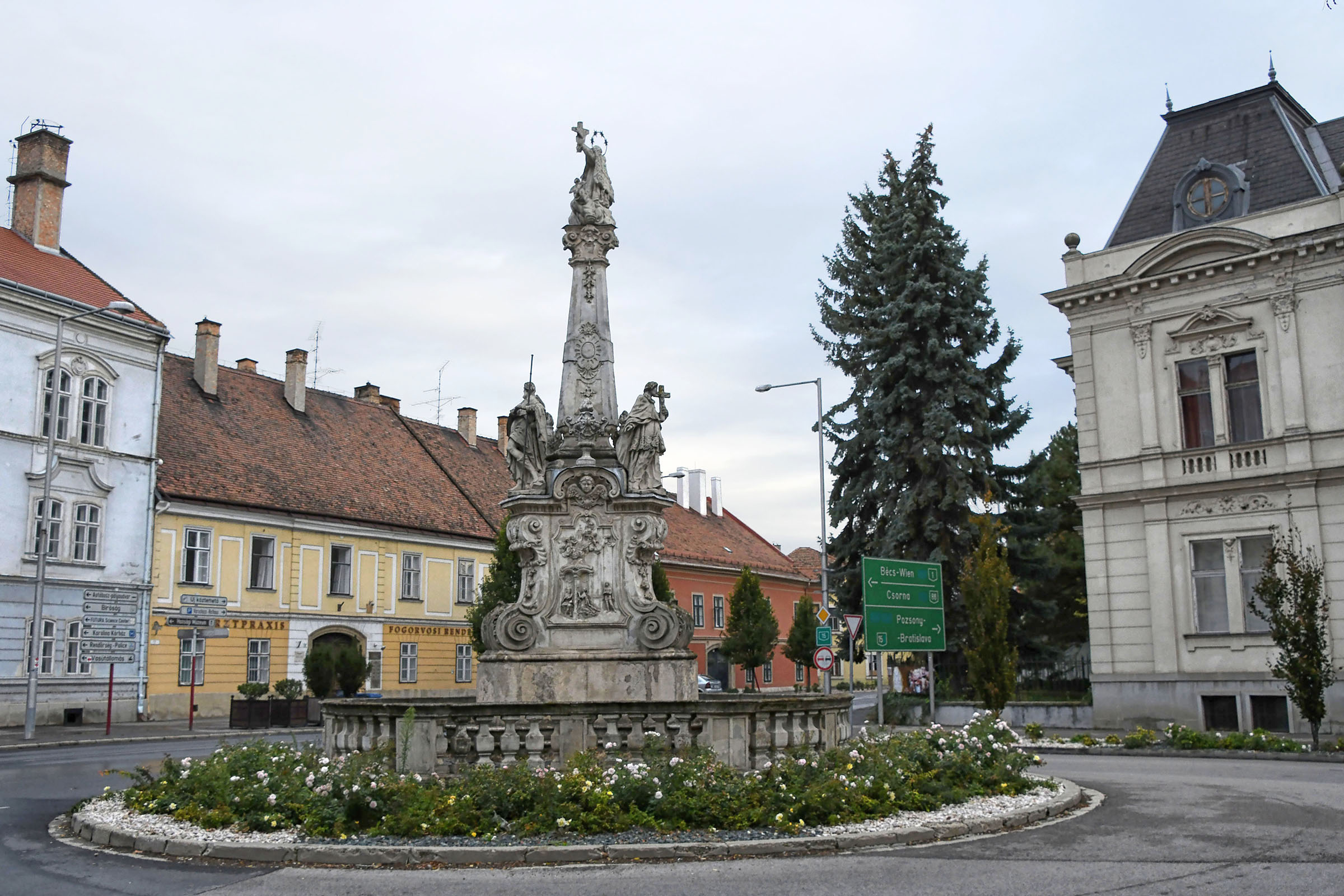
Mosonmagyaróvár

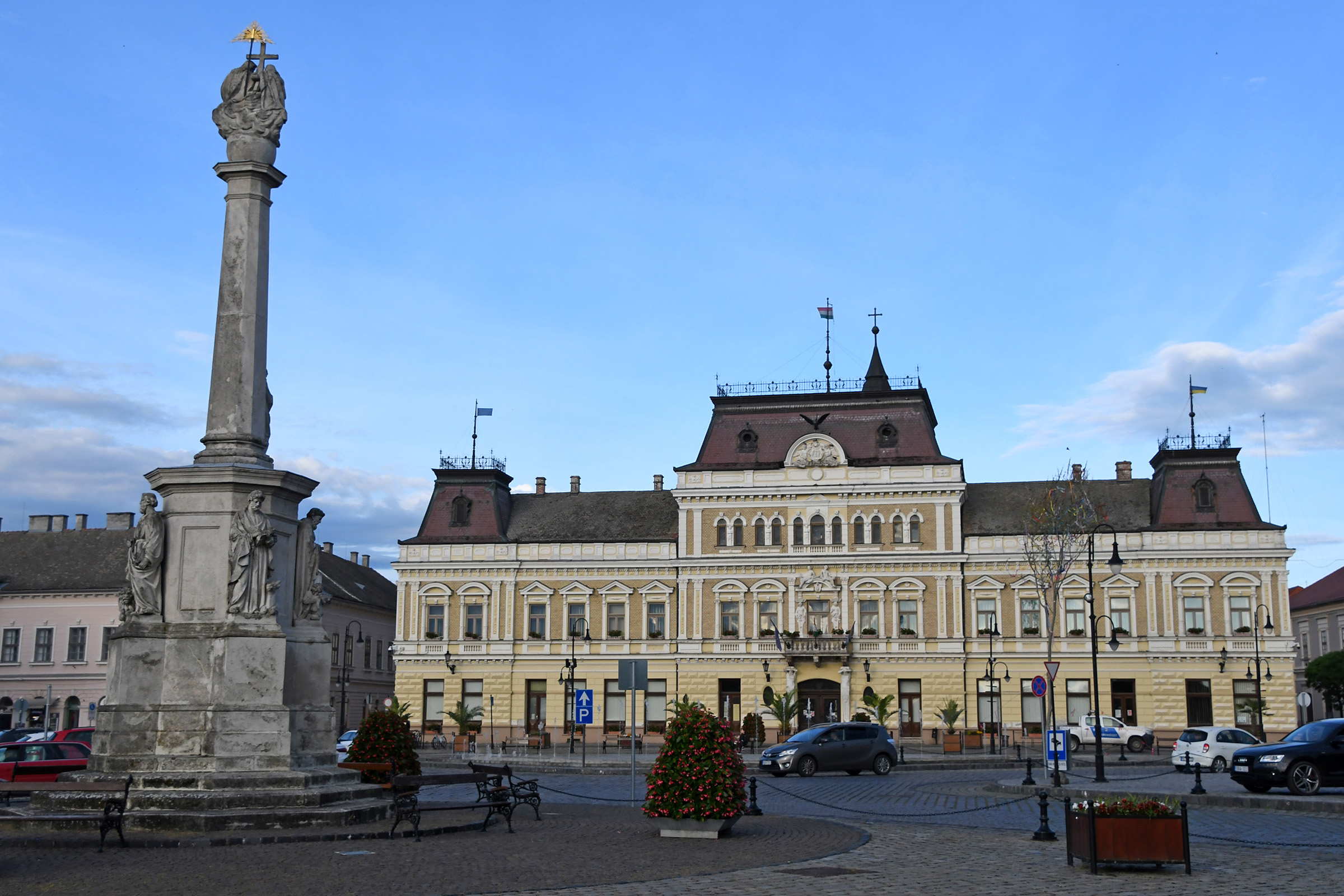
Baja

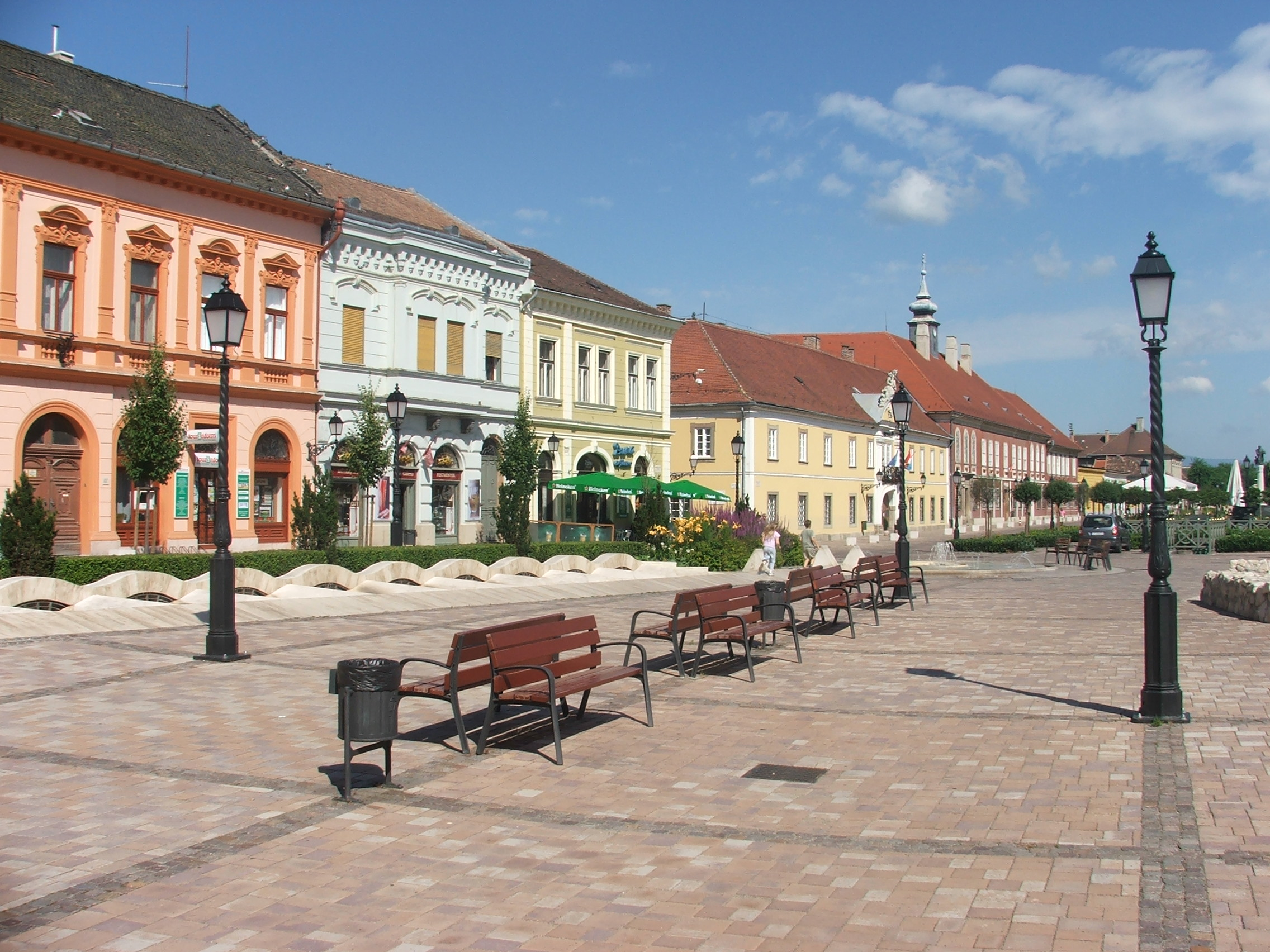
Vác

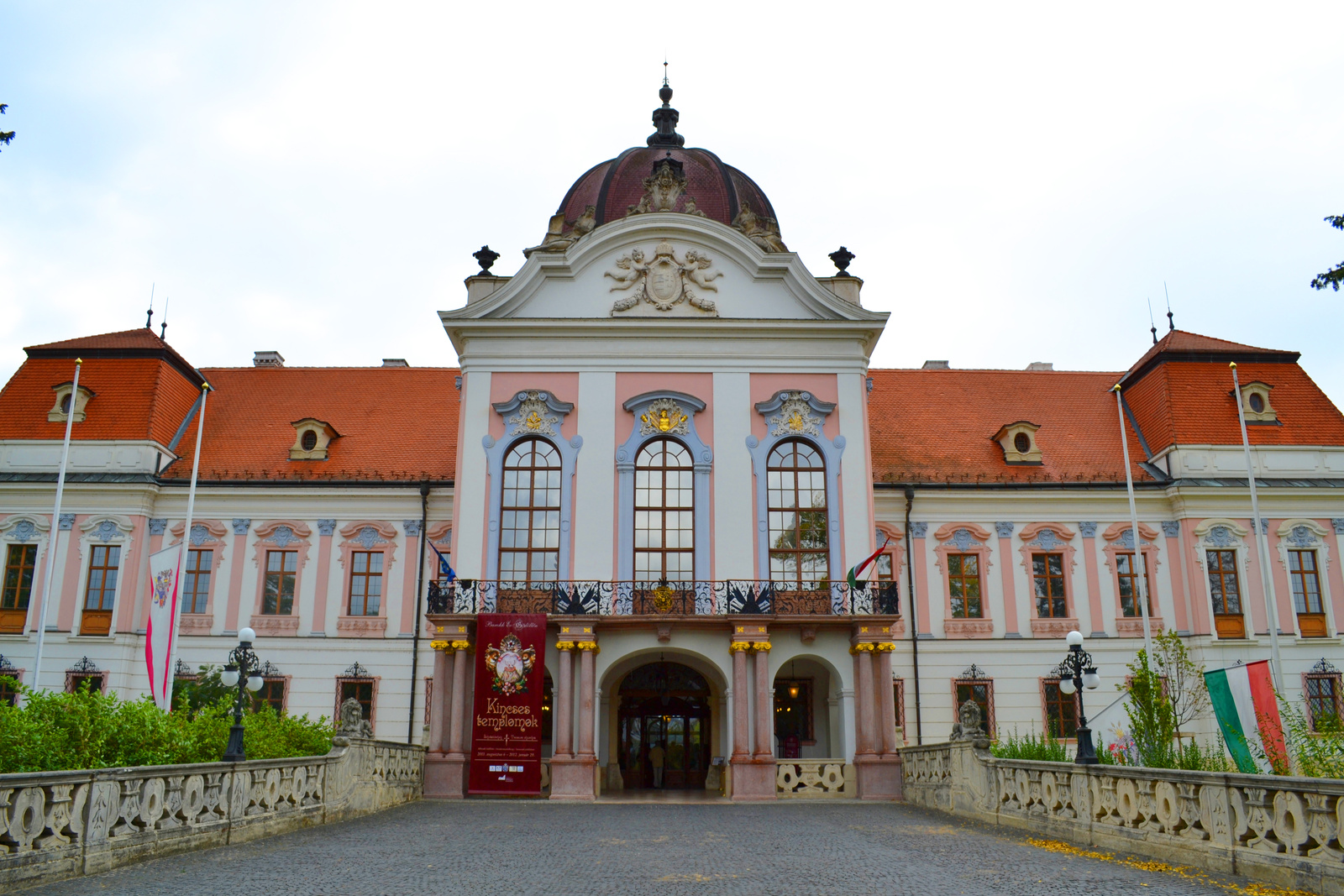
Gödöllő

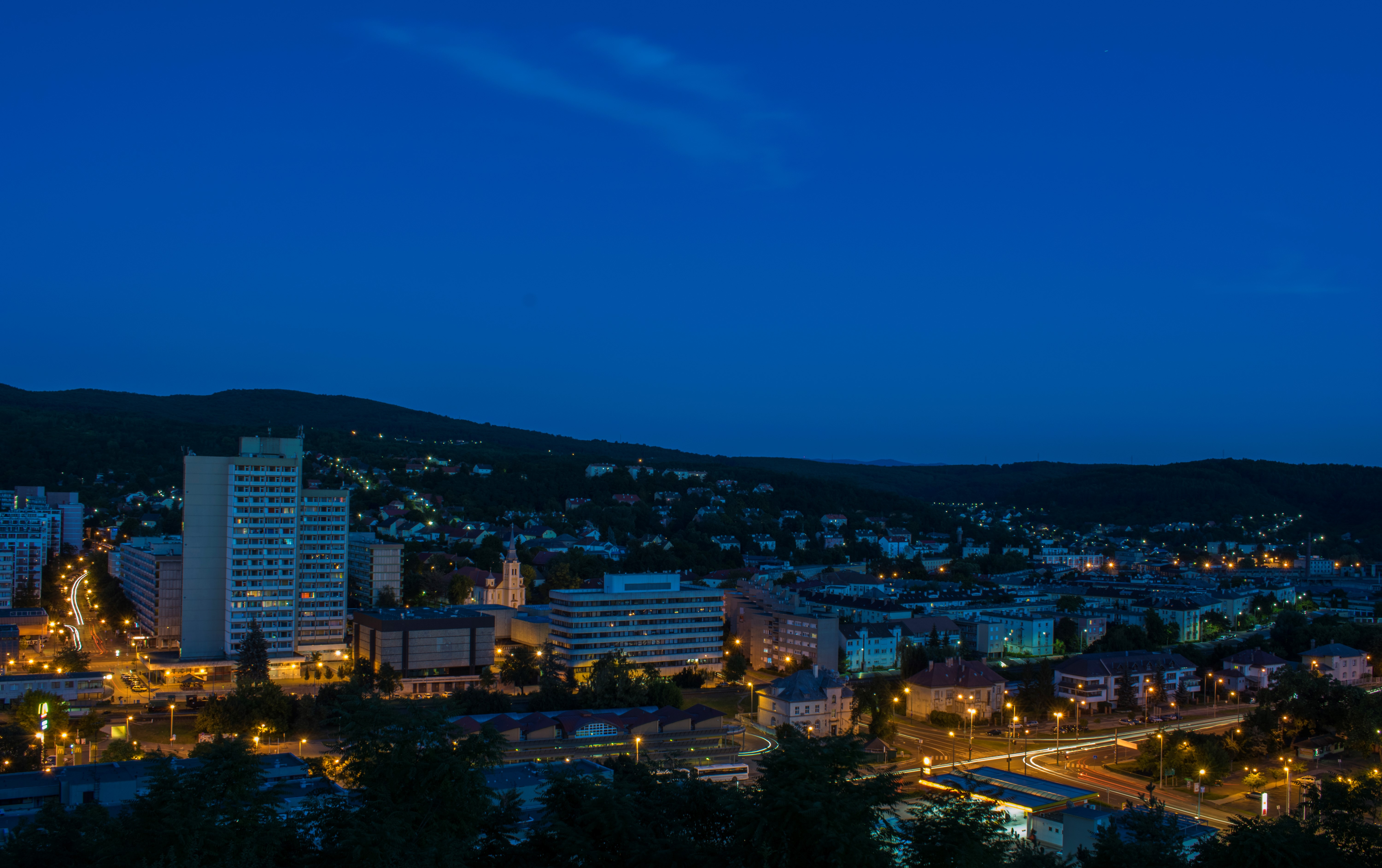
Salgótarján

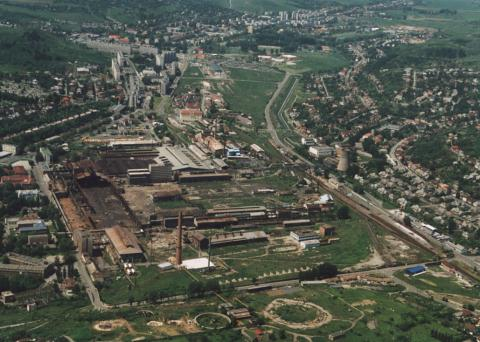
Ózd

== 30,000 – 24,000 ==
Sources:

- Szekszárd (29 889)
- Hajdúböszörmény (29 374)
- Pápa (29 019)
- Budaörs (28 864)
- Kiskunfélegyháza (28 615)
- Gyula (28 409)
- Esztergom (27 897)
- Szentendre (27 641)
- Gyöngyös (27 576)
- Ajka (26 720)
- Jászberény (26 516)
- Siófok (26 329)
- Orosháza (26 157)
- Kiskunhalas (26 129)
- Szentes (25 808)
- Gyál (25 053)
- Kazincbarcika (24 186)
- Hajdúszoboszló (24 094)
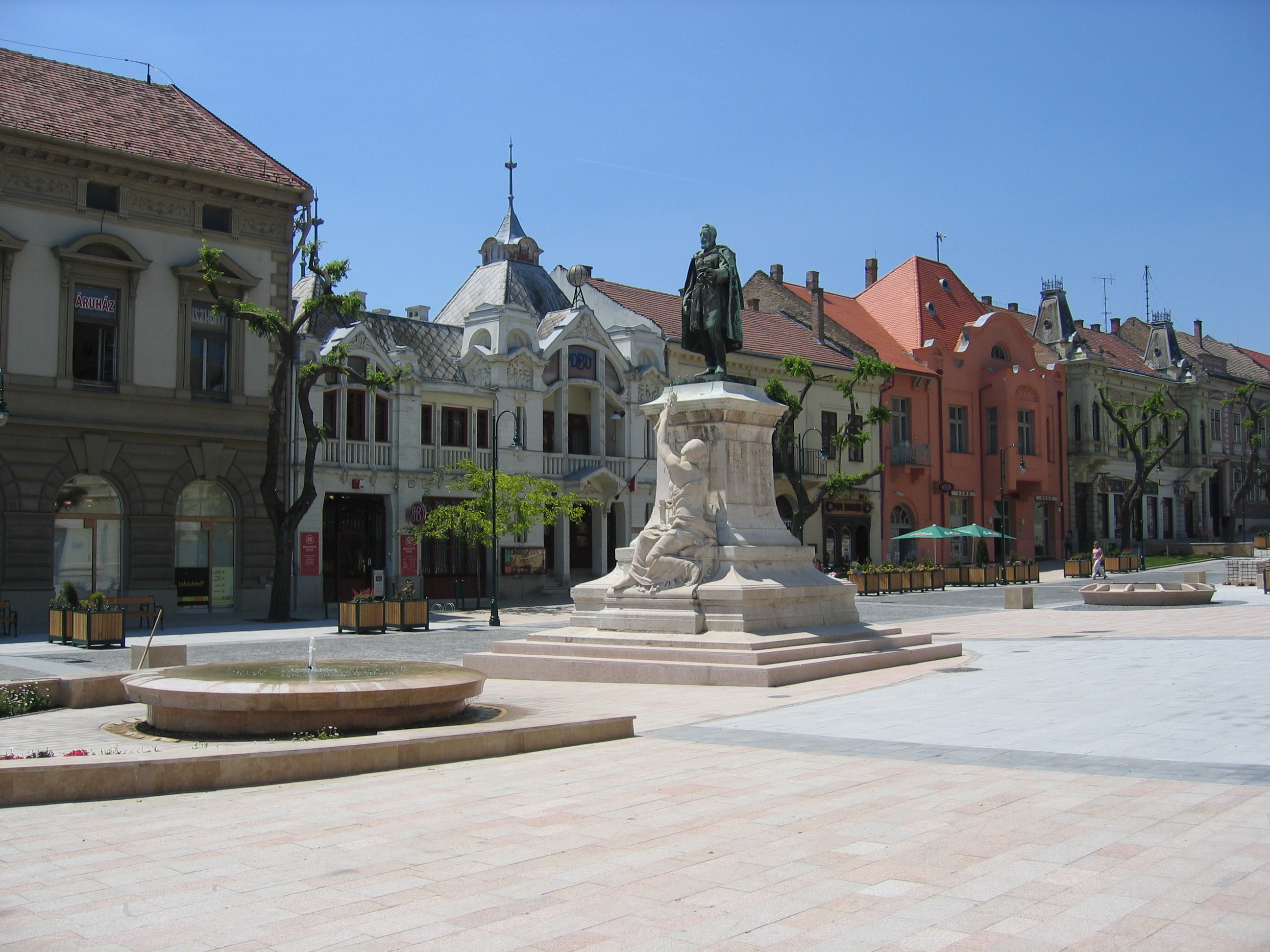
Szekszárd

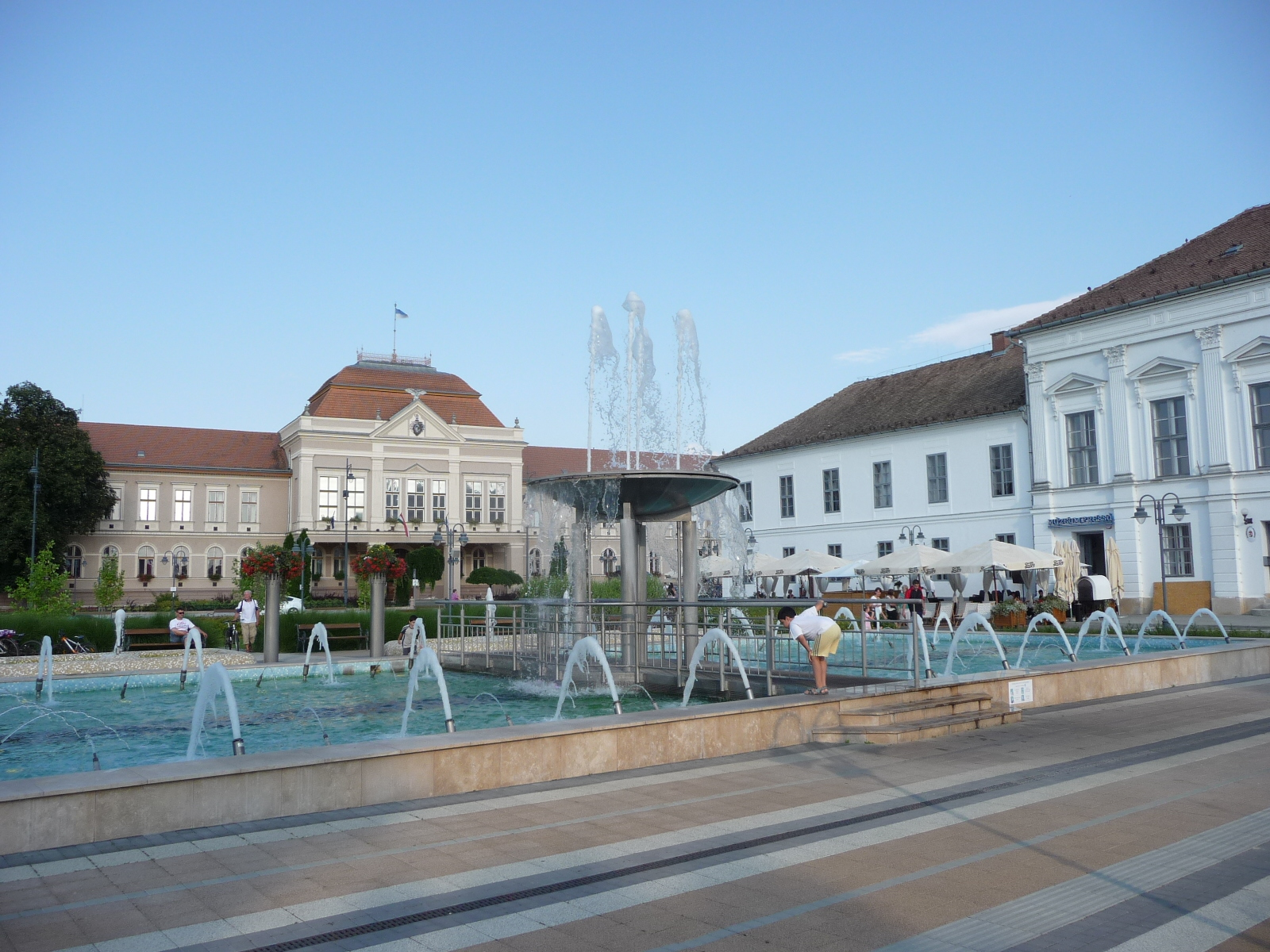
Hajdúböszörmény

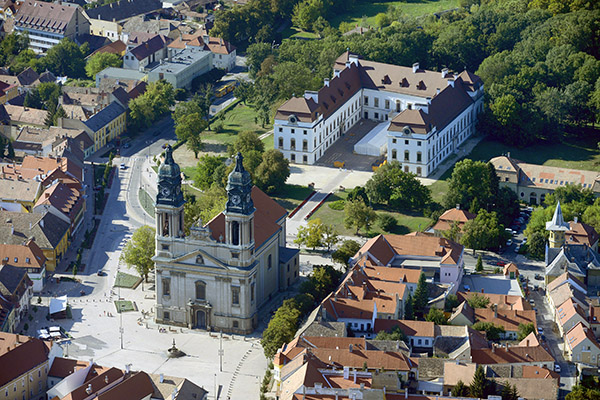
Pápa

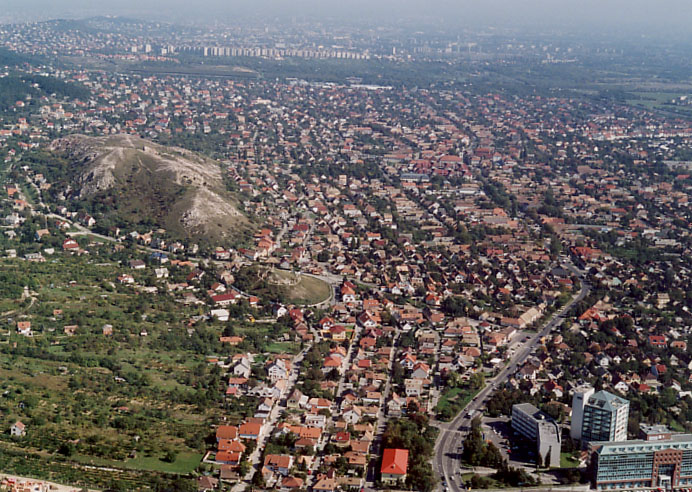
Budaörs

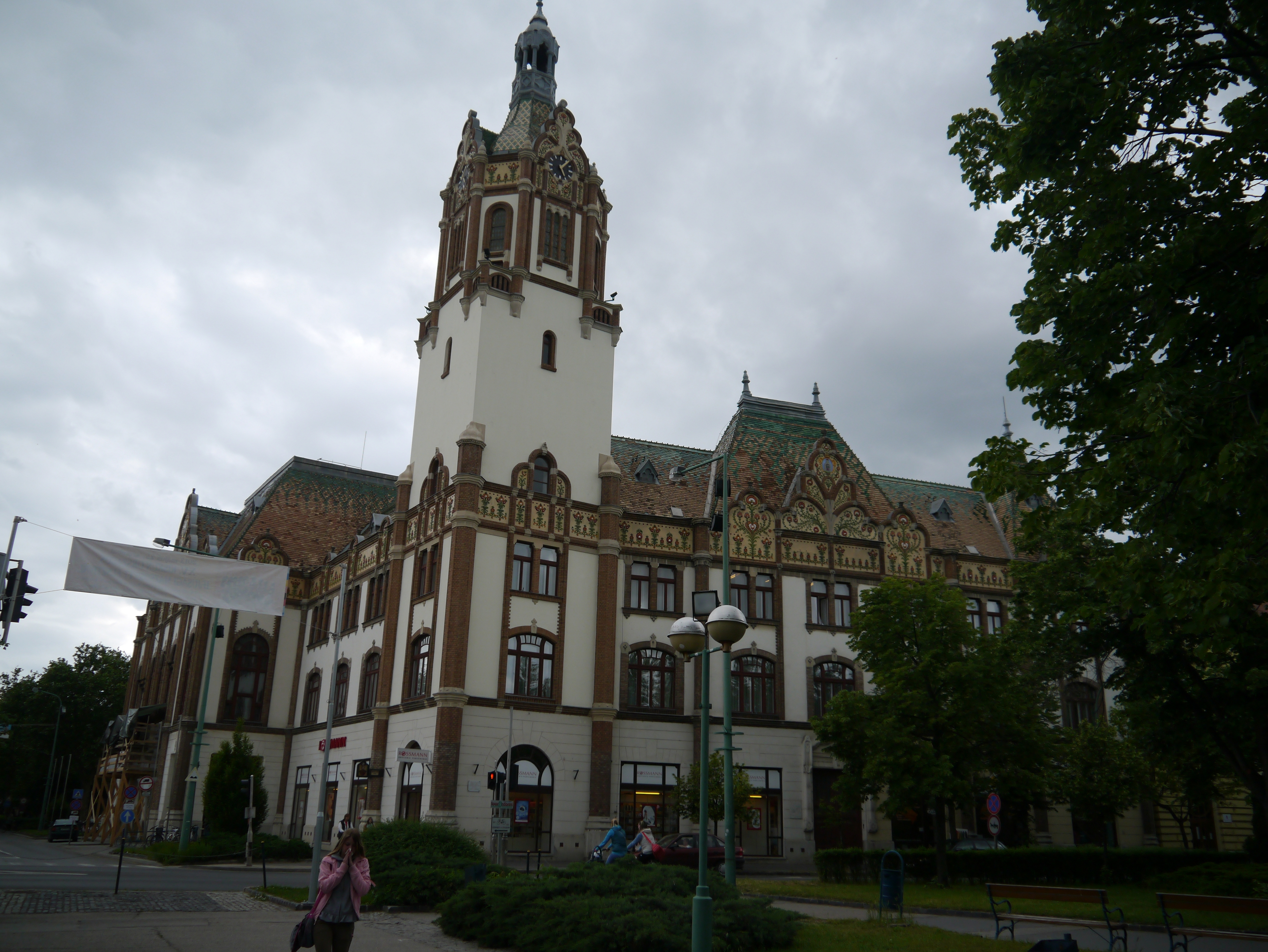
Kiskunfélegyháza

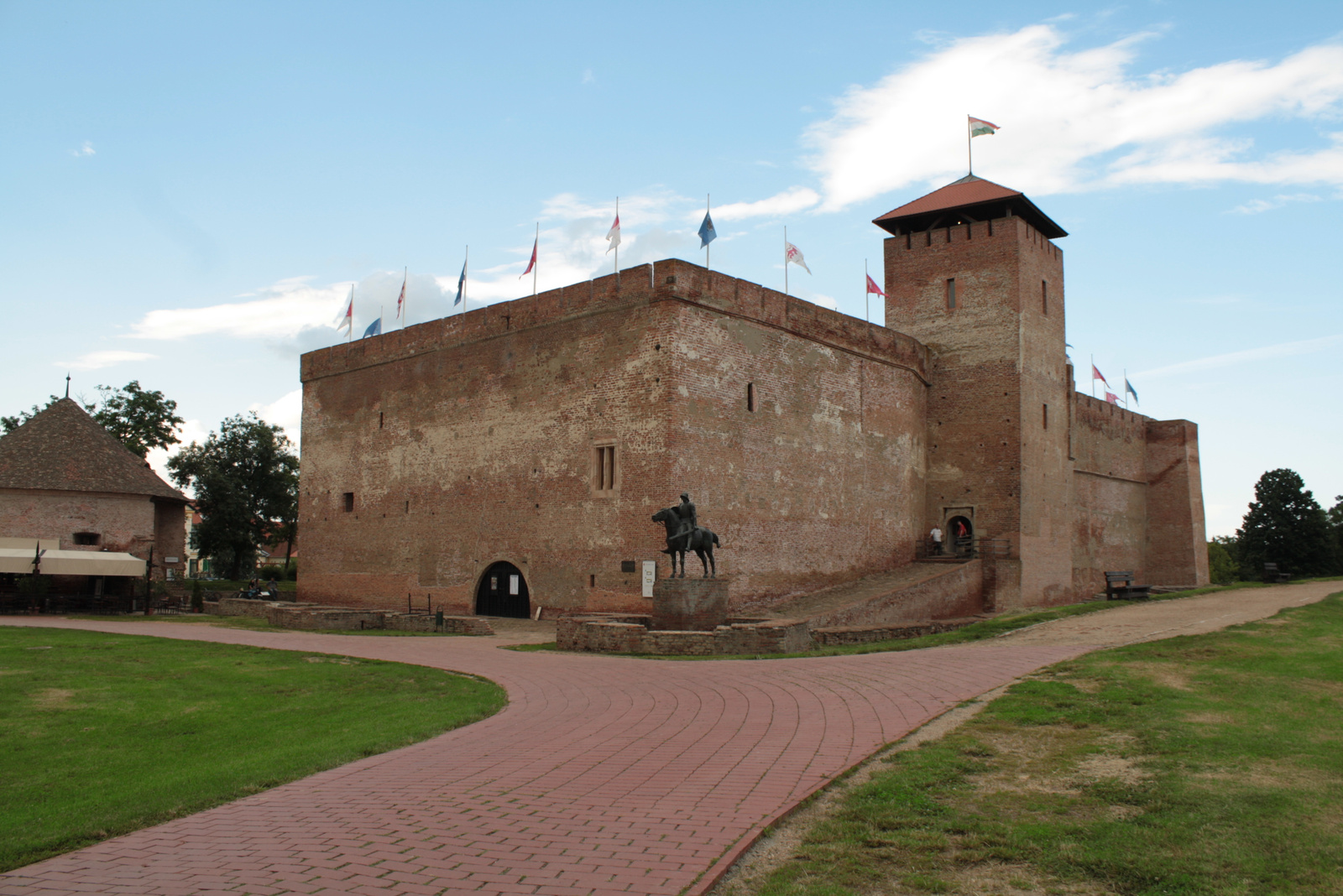
Gyula

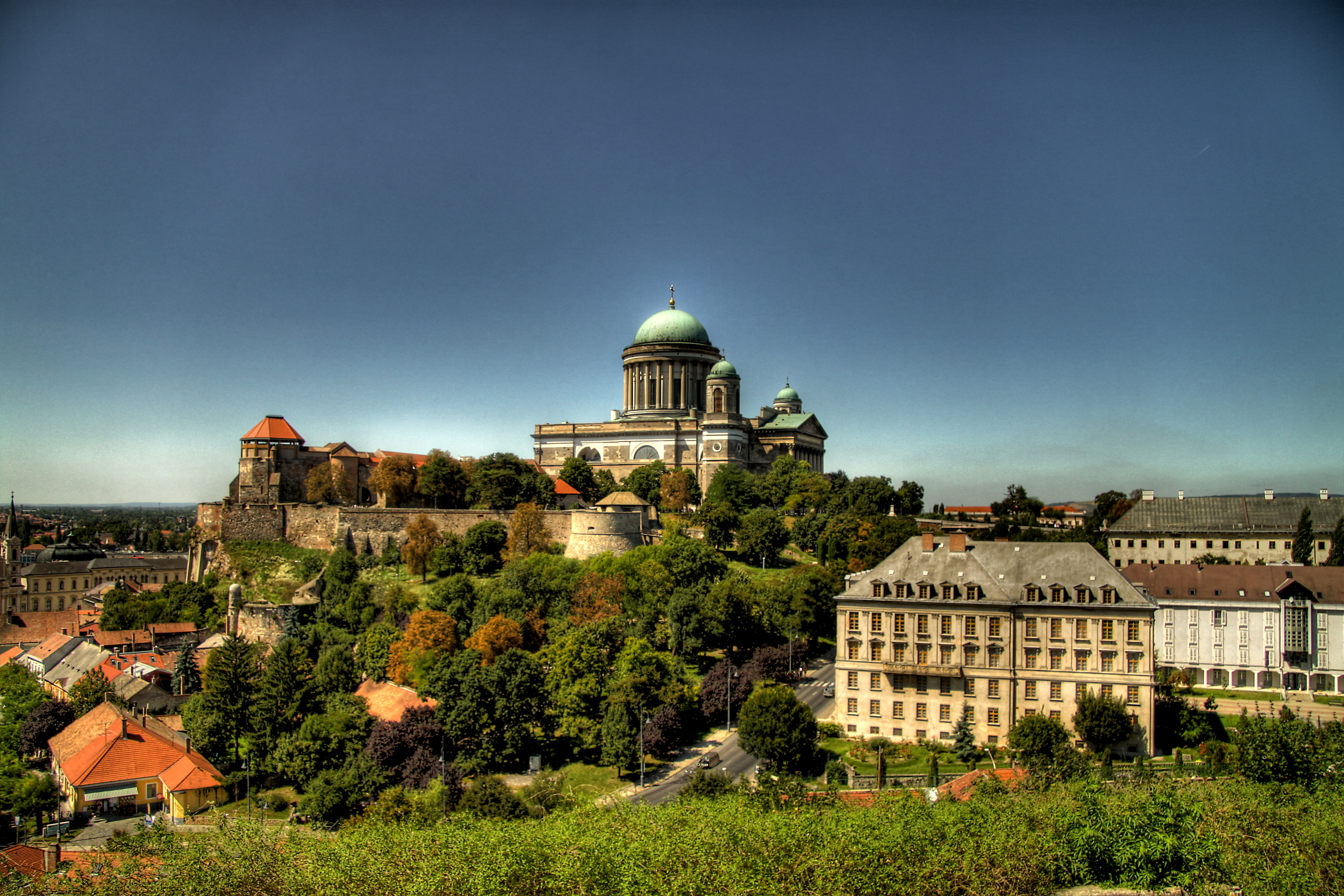
Esztergom

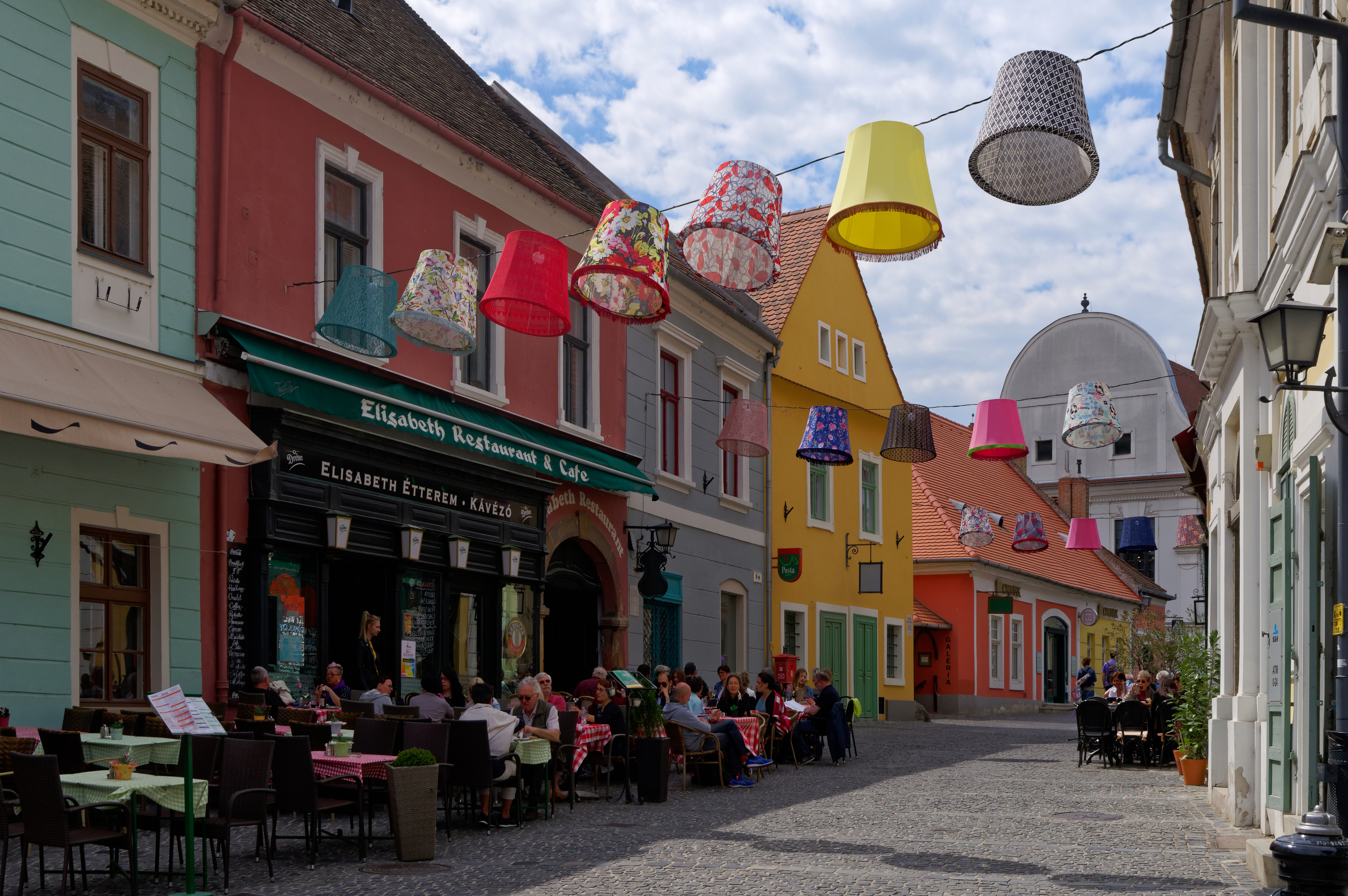
Szentendre

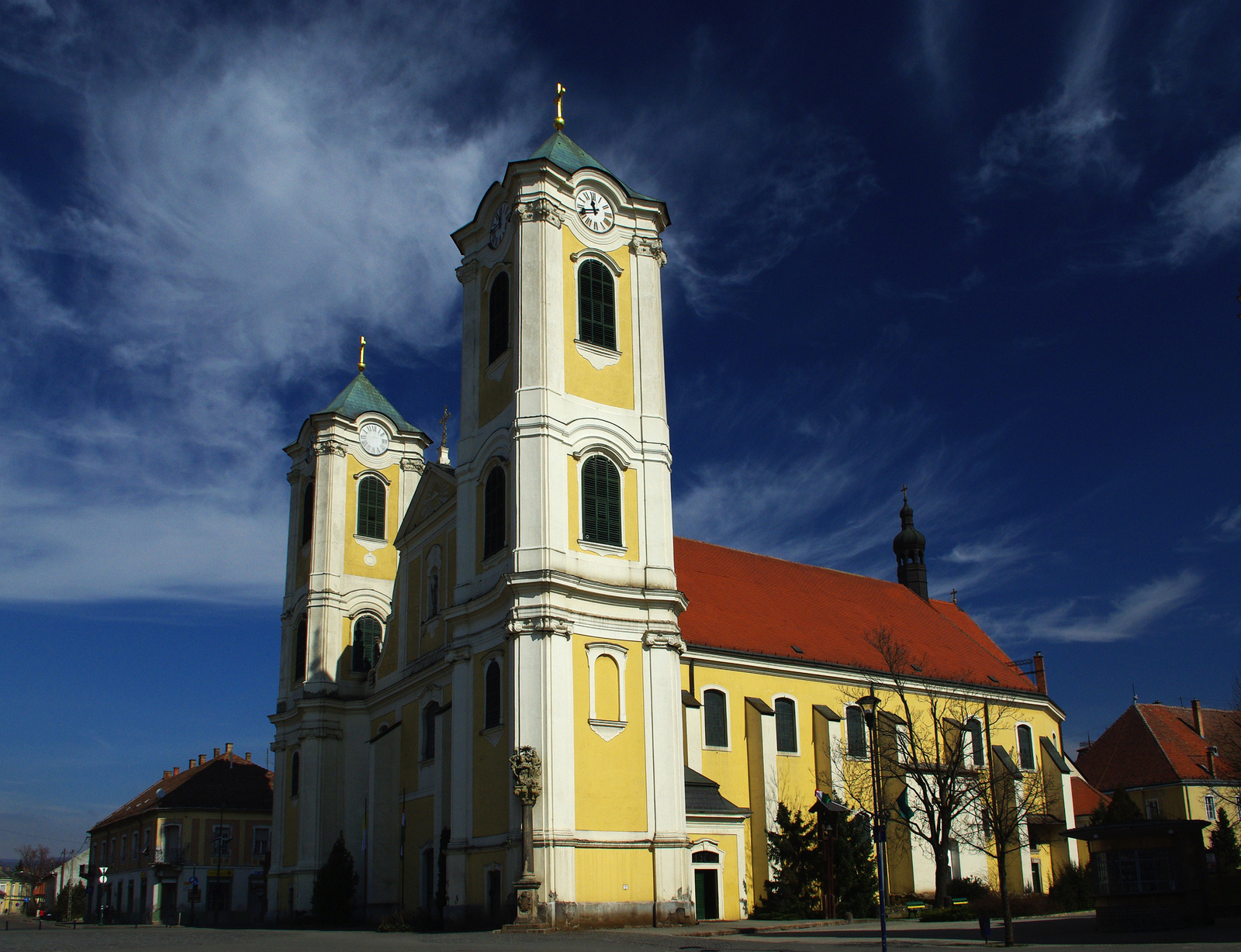
Gyöngyös

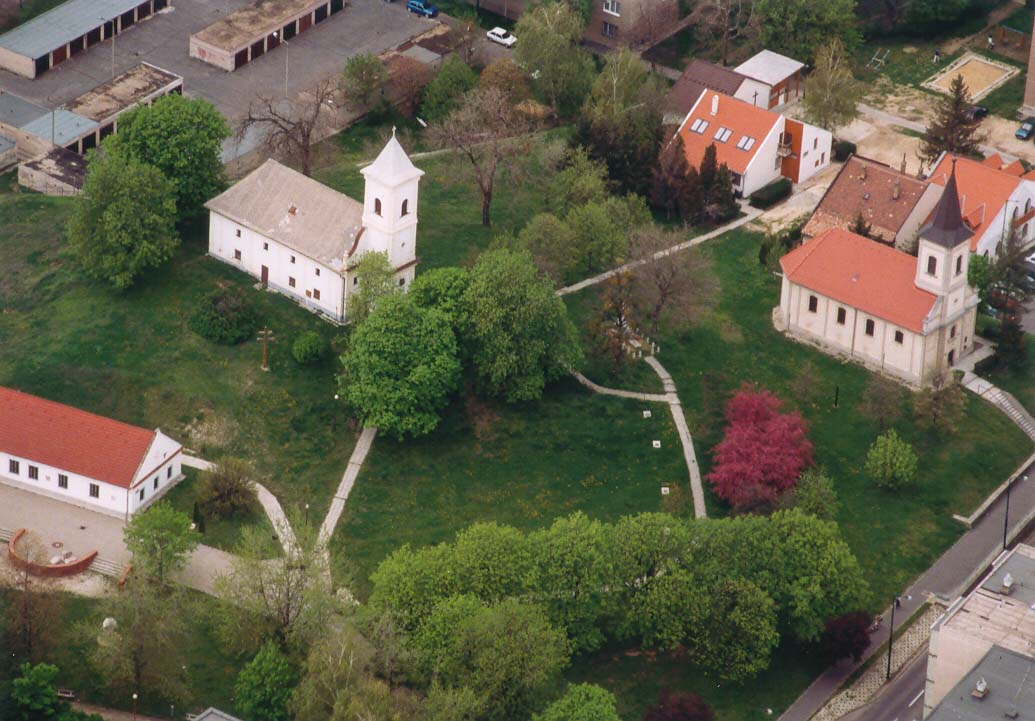
Ajka

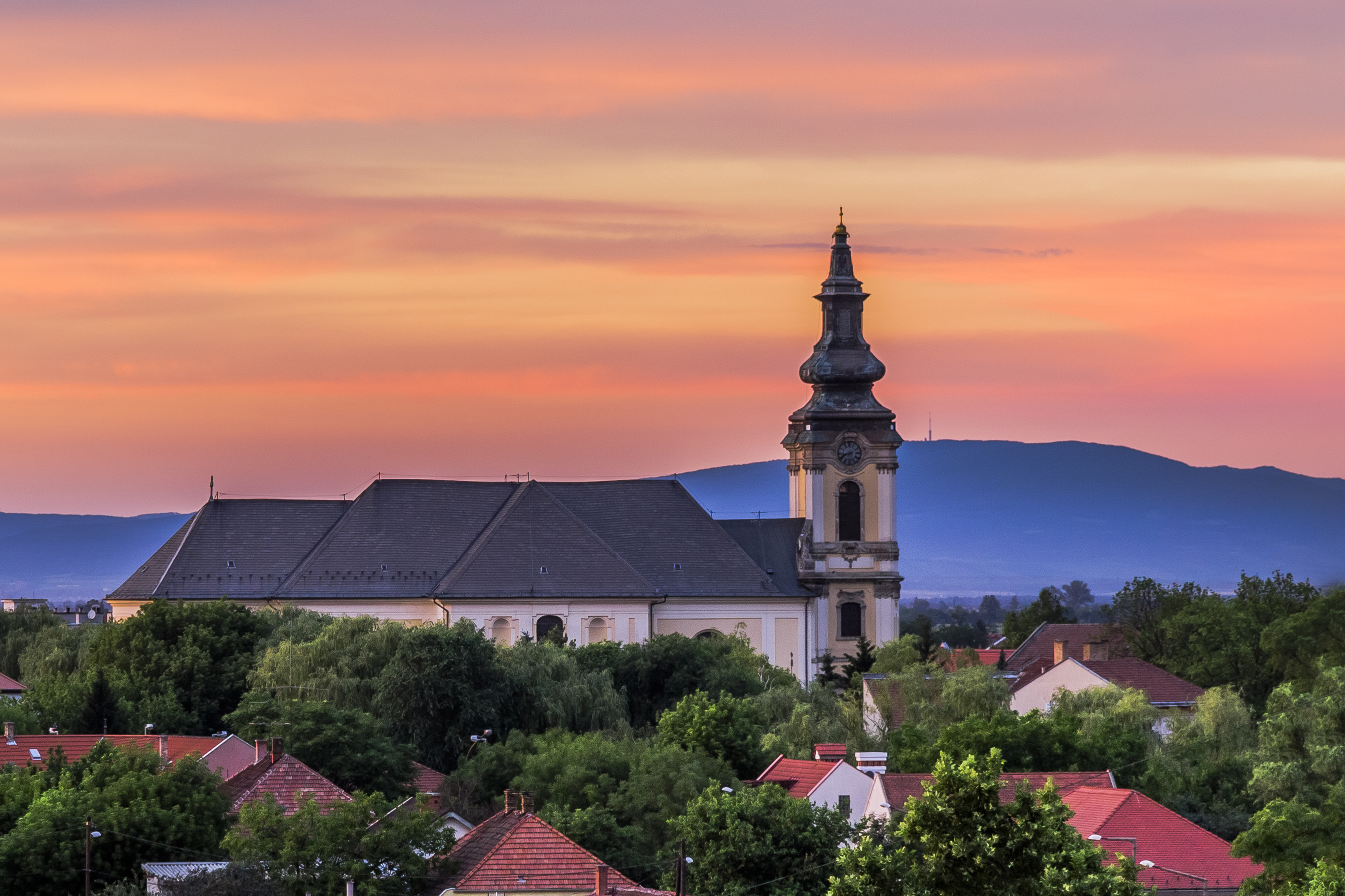
Jászberény

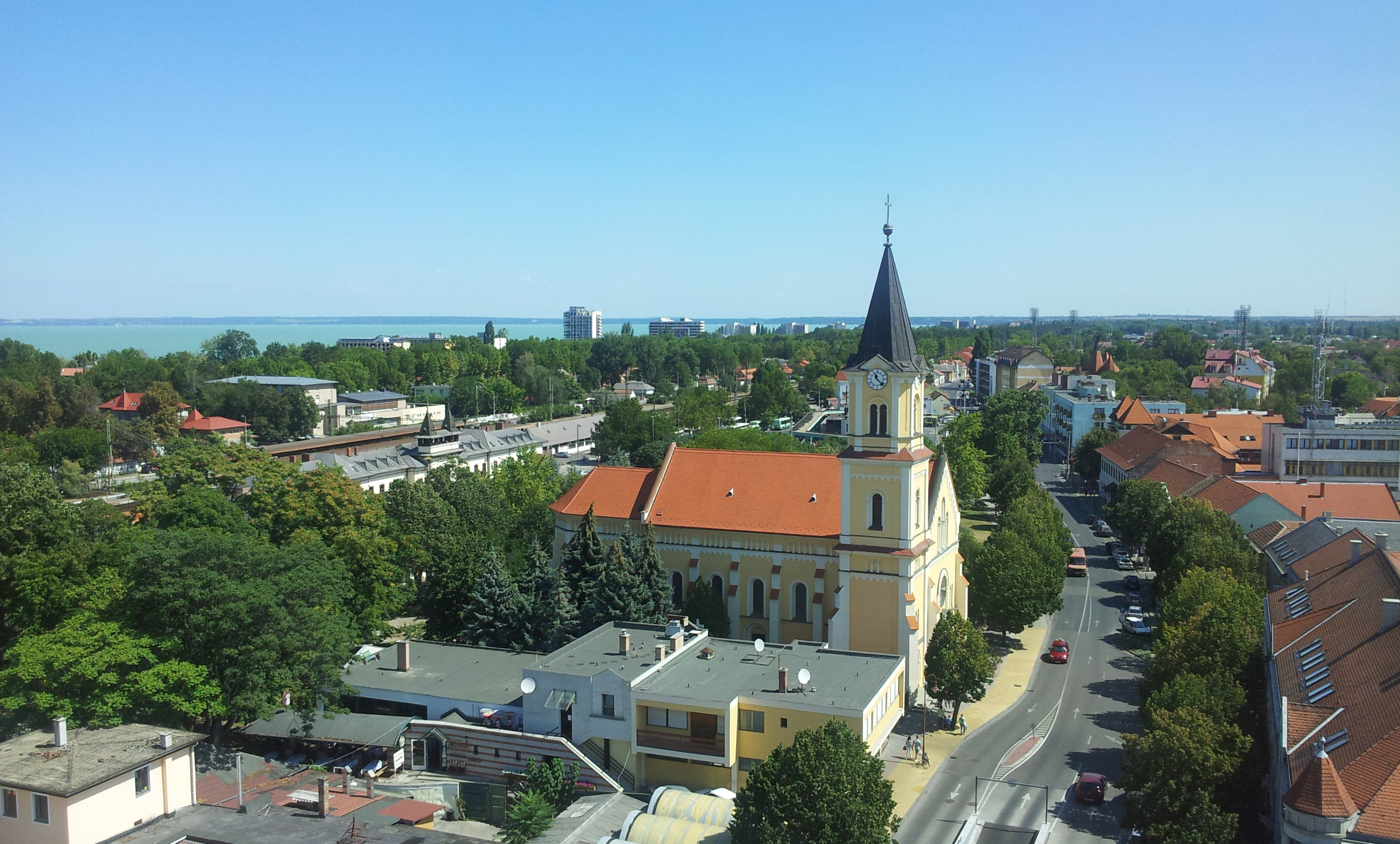
Siófok

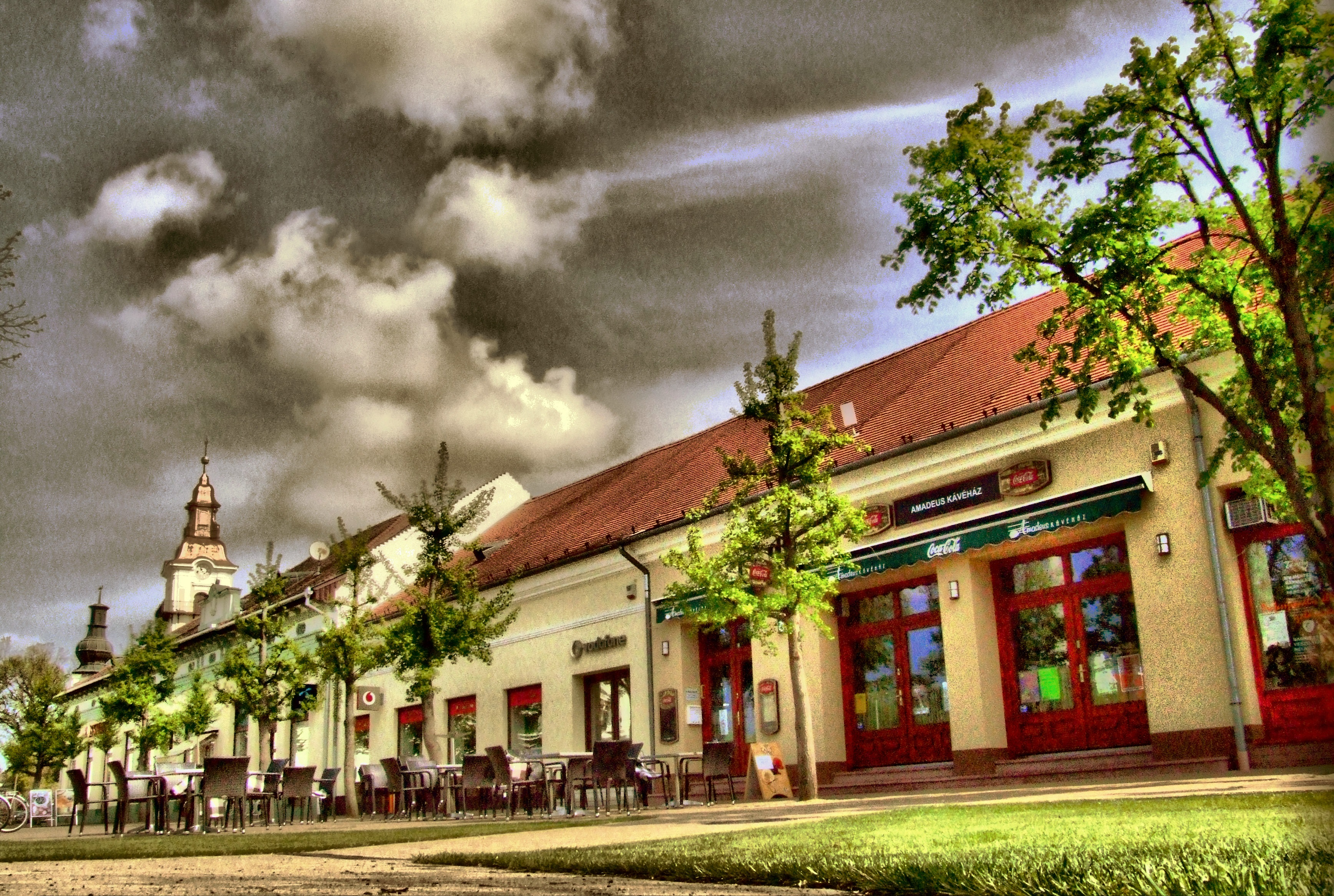
Orosháza

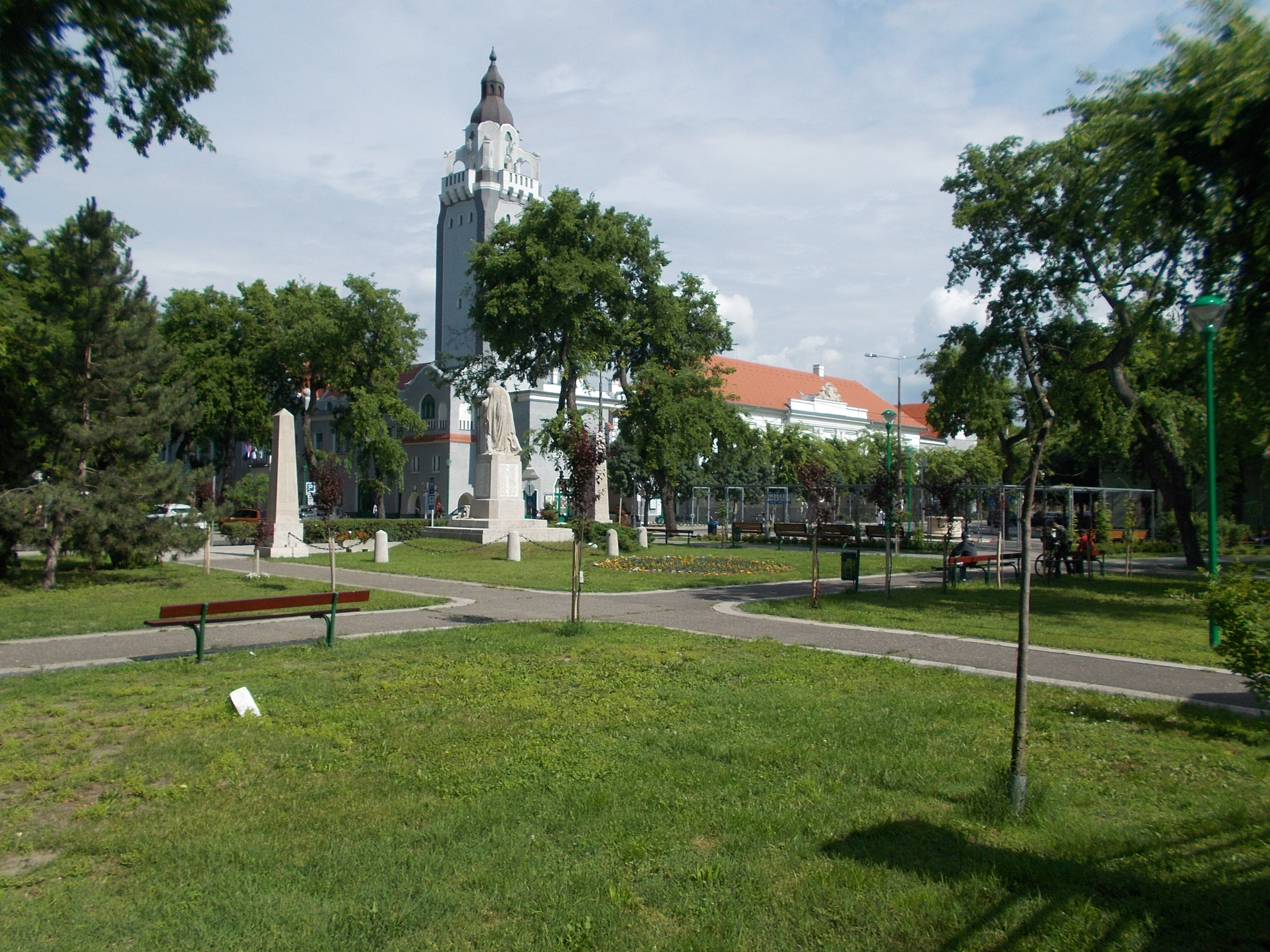
Kiskunhalas

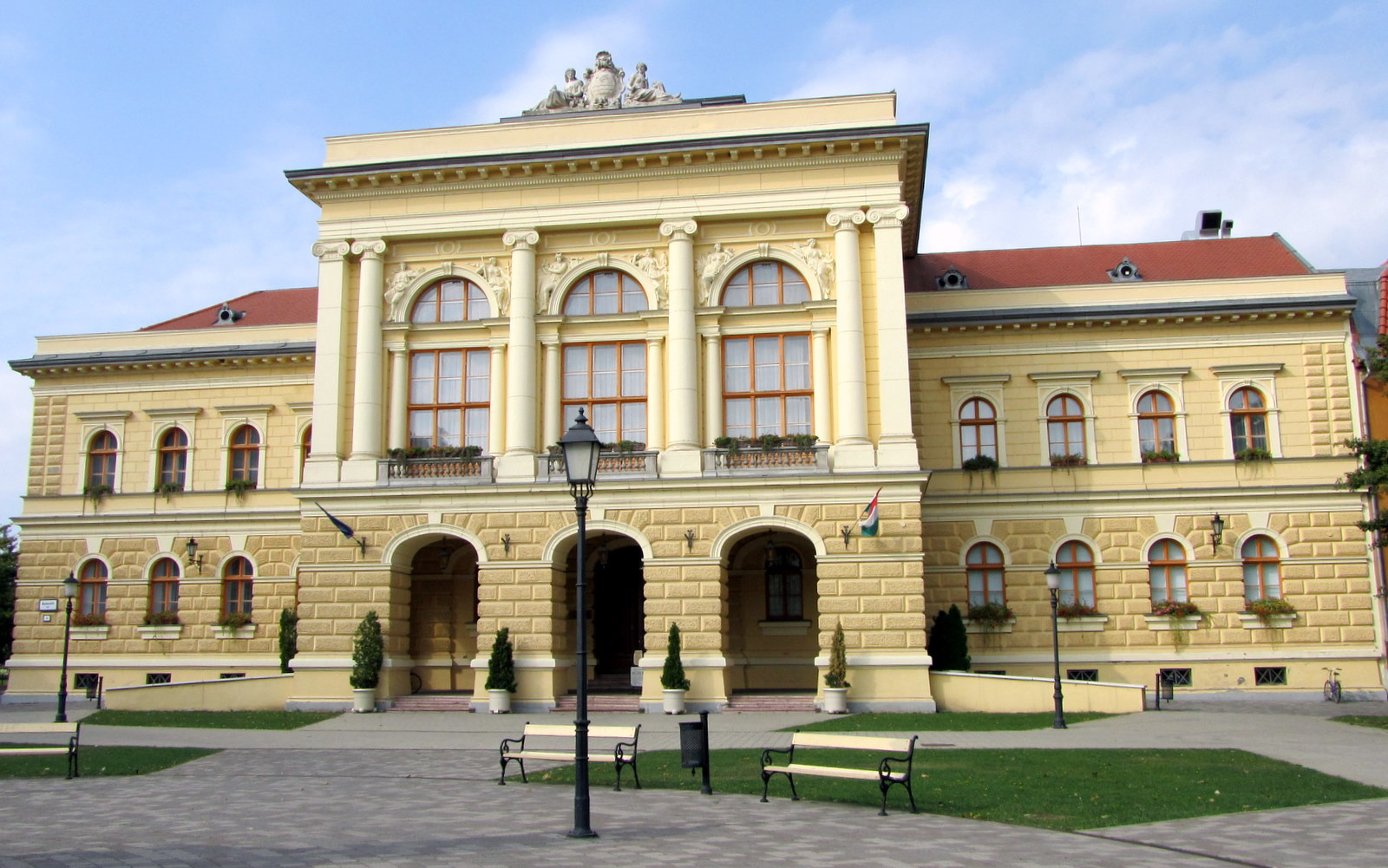
Szentes

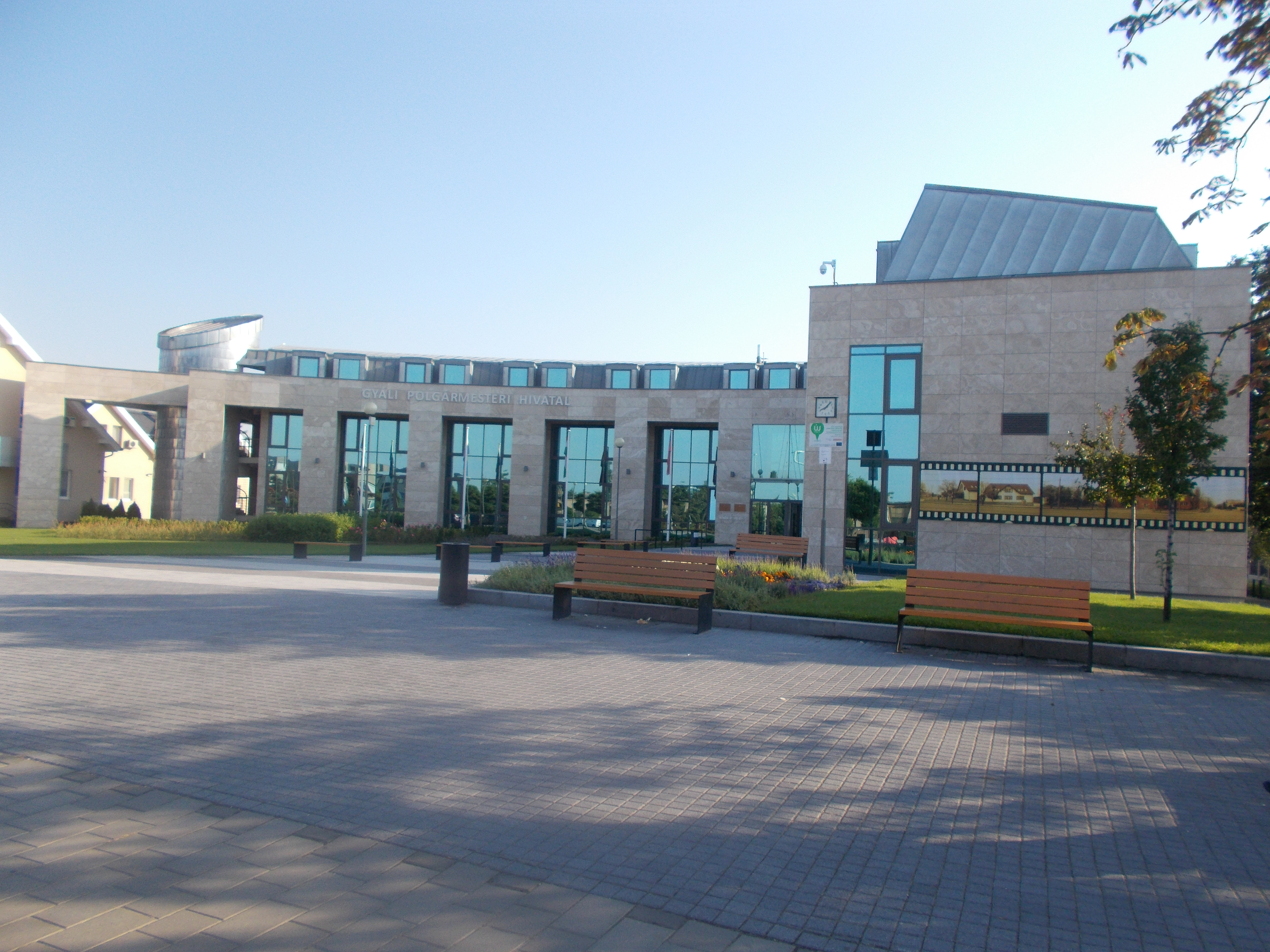
Gyál

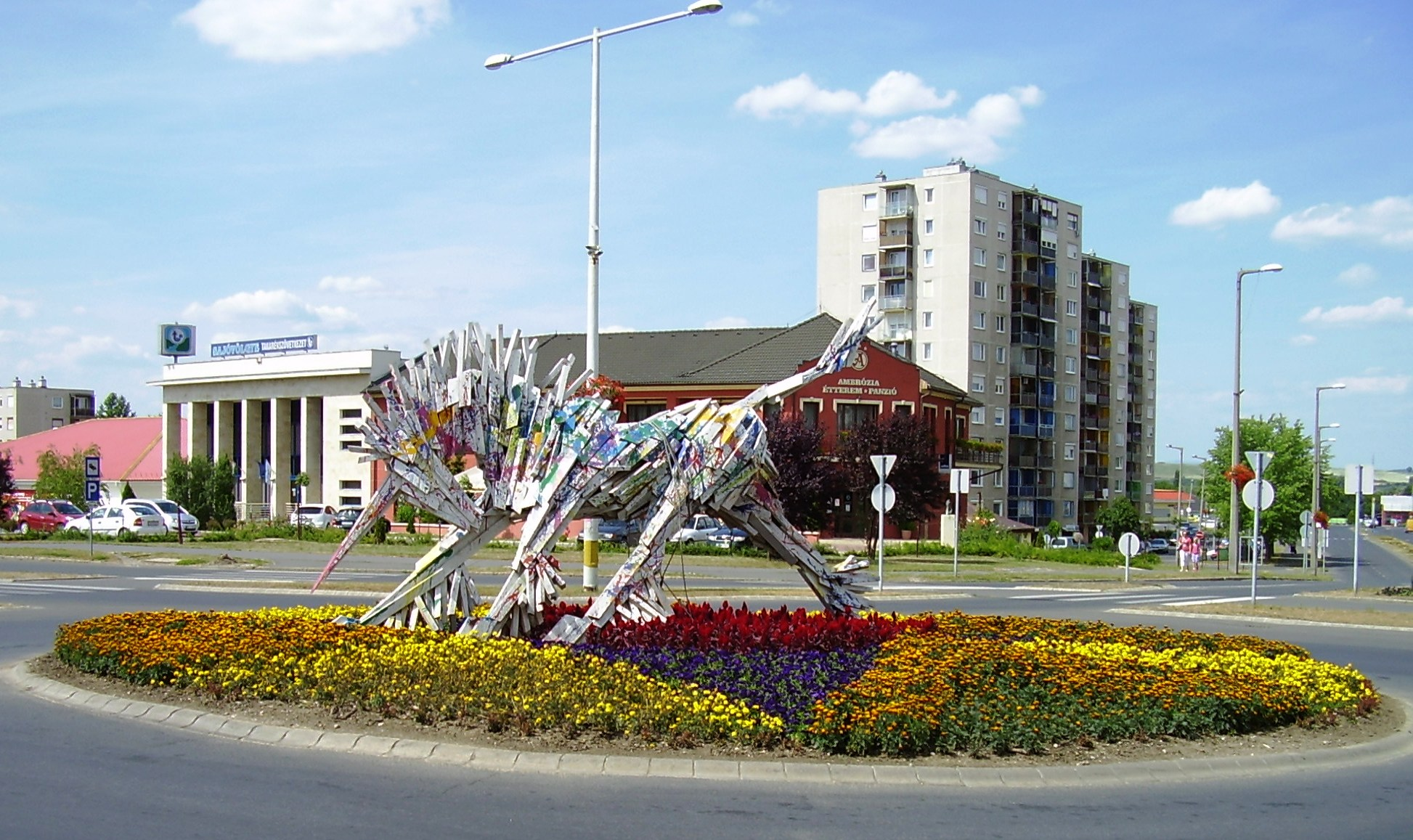
Kazincbarcika

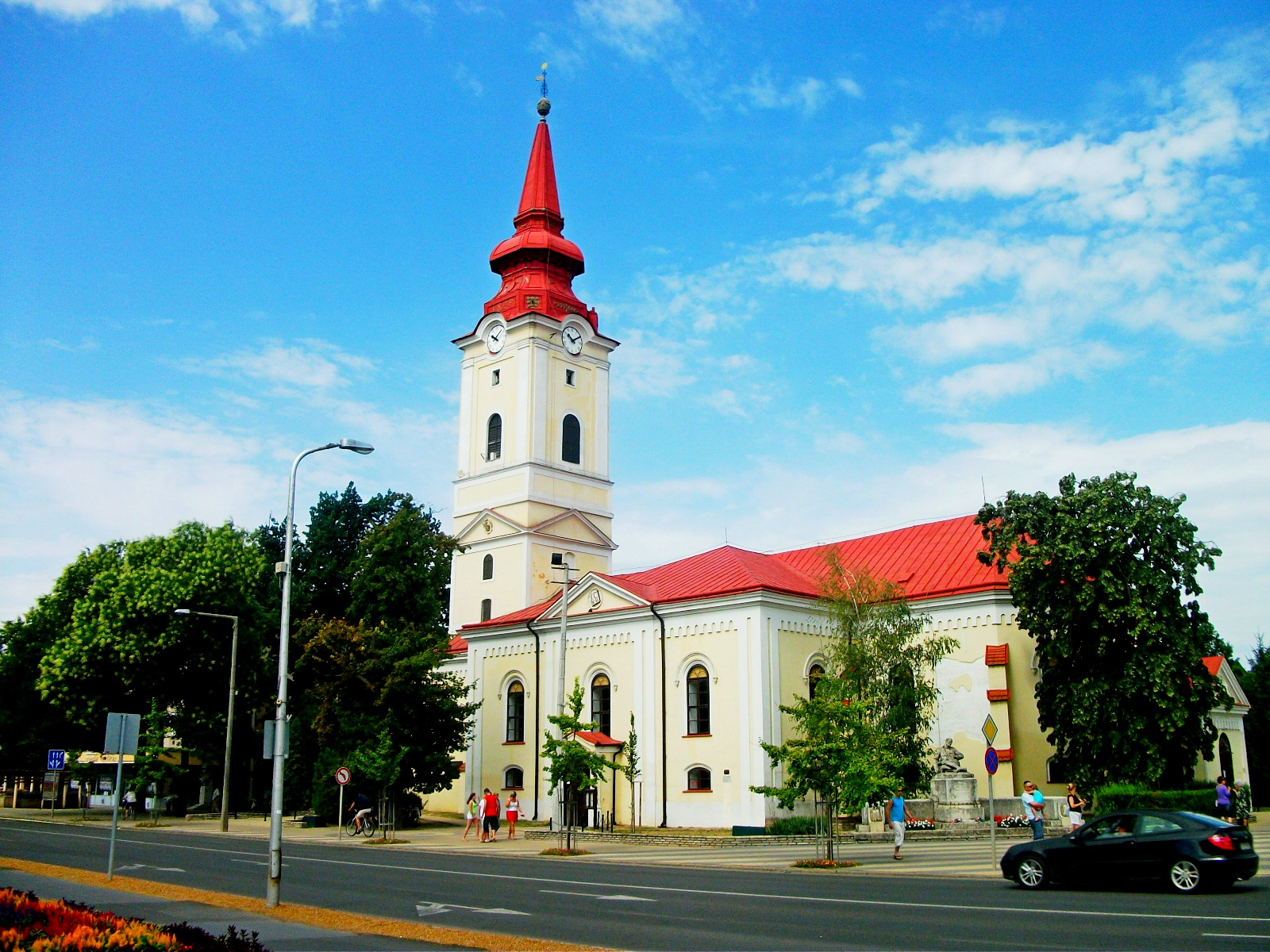
Hajdúszoboszló

== All other towns in Hungary ==
Sources: 24,000 – 15,000

- Dunaharaszti (23 688)
- Nagykőrös (23,589)
- Tata (23,445)
- Komló (23,388)
- Makó (22,747)
- Vecsés (20,673)
- Törökszentmiklós (20,323)
- Hatvan (20,250)
- Karcag (20,025)
- Keszthely (19,910)
- Várpalota (19,640)
- Békés (19,243)
- Fót (19,216)
- Paks (19,117)
- Komárom (18,786)
- Százhalombatta (18,599)
- Dombóvár (18,461)
- Göd (18,351)
- Oroszlány (17,983)
- Monor (17,960)
- Veresegyház (17,532)
- Balmazújváros (17,421)
- Mohács (17,355)
- Gyömrő (17,236)
- Szigethalom (17,156)
- Hajdúnánás (17,038)
- Mátészalka (16,864)
- Pomáz (16,764)
- Dabas (16,728)
- Mezőtúr (16,502)
- Kisvárda (16,489)
- Mezőkövesd (16,310)
- Csongrád (16,277)
- Szarvas (16,044)
- Kalocsa (15,986)
- Tiszaújváros (15,954)
- Pécel (15,494)
- Tapolca (15,459)
- Balassagyarmat (15,280)

15,000 – 5,000

- Berettyóújfalu (14,816)
- Sárvár (14,797)
- Sátoraljaújhely (14,703)
- Püspökladány (14,511)
- Abony (14,508)
- Kiskőrös (14,109)
- Mór (14,010)
- Budakeszi (13,939)
- Pilisvörösvár (13,903)
- Törökbálint (13,385)
- Bonyhád (13,322)
- Gyomaendrőd (13,133)
- Hajdúsámson (13,039)
- Balatonfüred (13,038)
- Biatorbágy (12,932)
- Tiszavasvári (12,818)
- Hajdúhadház (12,747)
- Újfehértó (12,607)
- Gárdony (12,600)
- Nagykáta (12,384)
- Kistarcsa (12,383)
- Bátonyterenye (12,221)
- Albertirsa (12,188)
- Nyírbátor (12,146)
- Sárospatak (12,067)
- Sárbogárd (12,038)
- Maglód (12,037)
- Bicske (11,984)
- Dorog (11,855)
- Üllő (11,774)
- Tiszakécske (11,743)
- Kőszeg (11,730)
- Pilis (11,518)
- Sajószentpéter (11,491)
- Körmend (11,419)
- Marcali (11,352)
- Lajosmizse (11,342)
- Isaszeg (11,264)
- Kiskunmajsa (11,216)
- Kisújszállás (11,182)
- Tiszafüred (11,091)
- Tolna (11,080)
- Celldömölk (10,827)
- Tiszaföldvár (10,741)
- Barcs (10,698)
- Budakalász (10,673)
- Szigetvár (10,585)
- Heves (10,475)
- Nagyatád (10,468)
- Kapuvár (10,431)
- Csorna (10,406)
- Tököl (10,168)
- Mezőberény (10,148)
- Ráckeve (10,069)
- Kerepes (9,904)
- Sarkad (9,808)
- Halásztelek (9,758)
- Edelény (9,516)
- Ócsa (9,247)
- Pásztó (9,212)
- Nagykálló (9,211)
- Siklós (9,147)
- Szeghalom (9,005)
- Szerencs (8,942)
- Szentgotthárd (8,872)
- Vásárosnamény (8,766)
- Nádudvar (8,697)
- Hajdúdorog (8,622)
- Derecske (8,612)
- Balatonalmádi (8,564)
- Túrkeve (8,563)
- Jánoshalma (8,530)
- Dunaföldvár (8,501)
- Kecel (8,445)
- Jászapáti (8,442)
- Kunszentmárton (8,324)
- Kunszentmiklós (8,309)
- Tamási (8,068)
- Fehérgyarmat (8,042)
- Ercsi (7,981)
- Polgár (7,908)
- Sándorfalva (7,772)
- Jászárokszállás (7,756)
- Dévaványa (7,747)
- Nyíradony (7,714)
- Tura (7,689)
- Dunavarsány (7,659)
- Kunhegyes (7,645)
- Füzesabony (7,527)
- Soltvadkert (7,405)
- Nyergesújfalu (7,378)
- Lenti (7,348)
- Létavértes (7,108)
- Kistelek (6,968)
- Zirc (6,899)
- Polgárdi (6,856)
- Ács (6,793)
- Vésztő (6,784)
- Mindszent (6,674)
- Ibrány (6,662)
- Enying (6,651)
- Putnok (6,609)
- Nyírtelek (6,535)
- Bácsalmás (6,496)
- Felsőzsolca (6,486)
- Kerekegyháza (6,470)
- Zalaszentgrót (6,448)
- Balkány (6,413)
- Szentlőrinc (6,401)
- Fegyvernek (6,324)
- Téglás (6,321)
- Nagyecsed (6,317)
- Solt (6,312)
- Encs (6,297)
- Martfű (6,237)
- Aszód (6,160)
- Sümeg (6,133)
- Bátaszék (6,118)
- Szabadszállás (6,116)
- Jánossomorja (6,099)
- Mezőkovácsháza (6,059)
- Újszász (6,054)
- Mórahalom (6,017)
- Kozármisleny (5,981)
- Tótkomlós (5,902)
- Szécsény (5,883)
- Tápiószele (5,869)
- Pusztaszabolcs (5,847)
- Battonya (5,835)
- Mezőcsát (5,826)
- Kaba (5,807)
- Berhida (5,785)
- Füzesgyarmat (5,752)
- Balatonboglár (5,673)
- Nagyhalász (5,660)
- Velence (5,619)
- Izsák (5,617)
- Alsózsolca (5,606)
- Jászfényszaru (5,597)
- Martonvásár (5,592)
- Lőrinci (5,446)
- Zsámbék (5,368)
- Kisbér (5,357)
- Jászkisér (5,349)
- Komádi (5,341)
- Vámospércs (5,322)
- Szikszó (5,307)
- Tiszalök (5,305)
- Mezőhegyes (5,274)
- Rákóczifalva (5,266)
- Csákvár (5,253)
- Tát (5,241)
- Balatonlelle (5,235)
- Újkígyós (5,009)

< 5,000

- Csurgó (4,932)
- Nyékládháza (4,865)
- Mélykút (4,841)
- Nyírmada (4,839)
- Csenger (4,820)
- Kemecse (4,811)
- Lábatlan (4,794)
- Csorvás (4,789)
- Emőd (4,761)
- Örkény (4,748)
- Fonyód (4,745)
- Hévíz (4,721)
- Nagymaros (4,717)
- Tiszacsege (4,684)
- Elek (4,659)
- Rácalmás (4,561)
- Körösladány (4,476)
- Aba (4,424)
- Kenderes (4,437)
- Tompa (4,413)
- Rakamaz (4,338)
- Harkány (4,303)
- Tab (4,301)
- Tokaj (4,282)
- Szendrő (4,249)
- Devecser (4,246)
- Záhony (4,237)
- Vasvár (4,229)
- Demecser (4,173)
- Abádszalók (4,160)
- Biharkeresztes (4,147)
- Mándok (4,094)
- Balatonfűzfő (4,084)
- Tét (4,062)
- Letenye (4,060)
- Bodajk (4,015)
- Pannonhalma (4,001)
- Pécsvárad (3,994)
- Simontornya (3,986)
- Dombrád (3,964)
- Baktalórántháza (3,954)
- Bóly (3,874)
- Fertőszentmiklós (3,864)
- Bábolna (3,840)
- Dunavecse (3,824)
- Verpelét (3,800)
- Mezőkeresztes (3,746)
- Ajak (3,709)
- Adony (3,686)
- Bük (3,579)
- Vaja (3,534)
- Medgyesegyháza (3,527)
- Fertőd (3,396)
- Herend (3,367)
- Nagybajom (3,309)
- Csepreg (3,272)
- Vép (3,266)
- Besenyszög (3,240)
- Lébény (3,229)
- Borsodnádasd (3,185)
- Cigánd (3,058)
- Sásd (3,053)
- Abaújszántó (3,021)
- Hajós (3,013)
- Bélapátfalva (2,979)
- Lengyeltóti (2,952)
- Zalalövő (2,945)
- Kisköre (2,870)
- Csanádpalota (2,801)
- Sajóbábony (2,761)
- Rétság (2,722)
- Nyírlugos (2,683)
- Szob (2,660)
- Beled (2,632)
- Répcelak (2,625)
- Balatonkenese (2,554)
- Sellye (2,548)
- Jánosháza (2,461)
- Gyöngyöspata (2,459)
- Rudabánya (2,458)
- Zamárdi (2,422)
- Kadarkút (2,418)
- Villány (2,406)
- Mágocs (2,316)
- Nagymányok (2,233)
- Balatonföldvár (2,150)
- Máriapócs (2,136)
- Badacsonytomaj (2,077)
- Pétervására (2,065)
- Gönc (2,053)
- Gyönk (1,999)
- Zalakaros (1,939)
- Visegrád (1,842)
- Pacsa (1,610)
- Igal (1,327)
- Őriszentpéter (1,154)
- Pálháza (1,050)

== Largest cities in Hungary in 1910 ==
In 1910, the ten largest cities in the Kingdom of Hungary (including Croatia-Slavonia) were:

1. Budapest (the capital of Hungary): 880,371
2. Szeged: 118,328
3. Szabadka (now Subotica in Serbia): 94,610
4. Debrecen: 92,729
5. Zágráb (then located in the Kingdom of Croatia-Slavonia, today Zagreb in Croatia): 79,038
6. Pozsony (now Bratislava in Slovakia): 78,223
7. Temesvár (now located in Romania): 72,555
8. Kecskemét: 66,834
9. Arad (now located in Romania): 63,166
10. Hódmezővásárhely: 62,445

Out of Hungary's ten largest cities in 1910, five are now located outside of the Kingdom of Hungary as a result of post-World War I border changes.

== See also ==
- Regions of Hungary
- Counties of Hungary
- Districts of Hungary (from 2013)
  - Subregions of Hungary (until 2013)
- Administrative divisions of the Kingdom of Hungary (until 1918)
  - Counties of the Kingdom of Hungary
- Administrative divisions of the Kingdom of Hungary (1941–44)
- NUTS:HU
