= Békés County 2nd constituency =

Hungarian national legislative constituency

Békes County 2nd constituency (Békés)
- Constituency for the National Assembly
- Location of Békés county 02 within Békés county

- Location of Békés county within Hungary
- County: Békés
- Electorate: 70,170 (2018)
- Major settlements: Békés

Current constituency
- Created: 2011
- Party: Tisza Party
- Member: Dávid Gombár
- Created from: Constituency no. 2; Constituency no. 3; Constituency no. 5
- Elected: 2026

The 2nd constituency of Békés County (Hungarian: Békés megyei 02. számú országgyűlési egyéni választókerület) is one of the single member constituencies of the National Assembly, the national legislature of Hungary. The constituency standard abbreviation: Békés 02. OEVK.

Since 2026, it has been represented by Dávid Gombár of the Tisza Party.

== Geography ==
The 2nd constituency is located in north-western part of Békés County.

=== List of municipalities ===
The constituency includes the following municipalities:

1. Békés
2. Békésszentandrás
3. Bucsa
4. Csabacsűd
5. Csárdaszállás
6. Dévaványa
7. Ecsegfalva
8. Gyomaendrőd
9. Hunya
10. Kamut
11. Kardos
12. Kertészsziget
13. Körösladány
14. Köröstarcsa
15. Mezőberény
16. Murony
17. Örménykút
18. Szarvas

== History ==
The current 2nd constituency of Békés County was created in 2011 and contains the pre-2011 5th constituency and part of the pre-2011 2nd and 3rd constituencies of the County. Its borders have not changed since its creation.

== Members ==
The constituency was first represented by Béla Dankó of the Fidesz from 2014, and he was re-elected in 2018 and 2022. In the 2026 election, Dávid Gombár of the Tisza Party was elected representative.

Election	Member	Party	%	Ref.
2014	Béla Dankó	Fidesz	47.80	
2018	Béla Dankó	Fidesz	52.00	
2022	Béla Dankó	Fidesz	57.71	
2026	Dávid Gombár	Tisza Party	51.39	
