= Békés County 3rd constituency =

Békes County 3rd constituency (Gyula)
- Constituency for the National Assembly
- Location of Békés county 03 within Békés county

- Location of Békés county within Hungary
- County: Békés
- Electorate: 69,062 (2018)
- Major settlements: Gyula

Current constituency
- Created: 2011
- Party: Tisza Party
- Member: Zsolt Ráki
- Created from: Constituency no. 2; Constituency no. 3; Constituency no. 4
- Elected: 2026

The 3rd constituency of Békés County (Hungarian: Békés megyei 03. számú országgyűlési egyéni választókerület) is one of the single member constituencies of the National Assembly, the national legislature of Hungary. The constituency standard abbreviation: Békés 03. OEVK.

Since 2026, it has been represented by Zsolt Ráki of the Tisza Party.

== Geography ==
The 3rd constituency is located in north-eastern part of Békés County.

=== List of municipalities ===
The constituency includes the following municipalities:

1. Bélmegyer
2. Biharugra
3. Doboz
4. Elek
5. Füzesgyarmat
6. Geszt
7. Gyula
8. Körösnagyharsány
9. Körösújfalu
10. Kötegyán
11. Méhkerék
12. Mezőgyán
13. Okány
14. Sarkad
15. Sarkadkeresztúr
16. Szeghalom
17. Tarhos
18. Újszalonta
19. Vésztő
20. Zsadány

== History ==
The current 3rd constituency of Békés County was created in 2011 and contains the pre-2011 2nd constituency and part of the pre-2011 3rd and 4th constituencies of Békés County. Its borders have not changed since its creation.

== Members ==
The constituency was first represented by József Kovács of the Fidesz from 2014, and he was re-elected in 2018 and 2022. In the 2026 election, Zsolt Ráki of the Tisza Party was elected representative.

| Election | Member | Party | % | Ref. |
|---|---|---|---|---|
| 2014 | József Kovács | Fidesz | 46.83 | |
| 2018 | József Kovács | Fidesz | 50.43 | |
| 2022 | József Kovács | Fidesz | 55.76 | |
| 2026 | Zsolt Ráki | Tisza Party | 52.19 | |
