= List of palaces and mansions in Békés County =

This is a list of palaces and mansions in Békés County in Hungary.

== List of palaces and mansions in Békés County ==
Name	Location	Established	Architect	Style	Family	Picture	Present function
Wenckheim Mansion	Gyula	1854-1860		Romanticism	Wenckheim		
Wenckheim Mansion	Békés						
Wenckheim Mansion	Békéscsaba						
Léderer Mansion	Békésszentandrás						
Kárász Hunting Lodge	Bélmegyer	1855-1862		Romanticism; Eclecticism	Wenckheim		
Wenckheim Hunting Lodge	Bélmegyer						
Beliczey Mansion	Csabaszabadi						
Wenckheim Rudolf Mansion	Csorvás						
Wenckheim Sándor Mansion	Csorvás						
Wenckheim Mansion	Doboz						
Wenckheim Mansion	Füzesgyarmat						
Tisza Mansion	Geszt						
Harruckern–Wenckheim–Almásy Mansion	Gyula	1725		Baroque / Zopf	Harruckern; Wenckheim; Almásy		
Wenckheim Mansion	Kaszaper						
Andrássy–Almásy Mansion	Kétegyháza						
Batthyány–Geist Hunting Lodge	Kondoros						
Wenckheim–Merán Mansion	Körösladány						
Vásárhelyi–Bréda Mansion	Lőkösháza	1810		Classicism	Vásárhelyi		
Wenckheim–Fejérváry Mansion	Mezőberény						
Geist Gáspár Mansion	Orosháza						
Almásy Mansion	Sarkad						
Wenckheim Mansion	Szabadkígyós	1874-1879		Neo-Renaissance; Eclecticism	Wenckheim		School and dormitory
Bolza Mansion	Szarvas	1810		Classicism	Bolza; Batthyány		
Csáky Mansion	Szarvas						
Mitrovszky Mansion	Szarvas						
Kárász Mansion	Szeghalom						
Wenckheim–D’Orsay Mansion	Szeghalom	1792-1805		Classicism; Romanticism	Wenckheim		
Wenckheim Mansion	Tarhos						
Fried Mansion	Zsadány						

== See also ==
- List of palaces and mansions in Hungary
- List of castles in Hungary

== Literature ==
- Zsolt Virág : Magyar Kastélylexikon - Békés megye kastélyai, 2006
