= Békés County 1st constituency =

Constituency in Hungary (2012-)

Békes County 1st constituency (Békéscsaba)
- Constituency for the National Assembly
- Location of Békés county 01 within Békés county

- Location of Békés county within Hungary
- County: Békés
- Electorate: 69,326 (2018)
- Major settlements: Békéscsaba

Current constituency
- Created: 2011
- Party: Tisza Party
- Member: István Bodóczi
- Created from: Constituency no. 1; Constituency no. 2; Constituency no. 3
- Elected: 2026

The 1st constituency of Békés County (Hungarian: Békés megyei 01. számú országgyűlési egyéni választókerület) is one of the single member constituencies of the National Assembly, the national legislature of Hungary. The constituency standard abbreviation: Békés 01. OEVK.

Since 2026, it has been represented by István Bodóczi of the Tisza Party.

== Geography ==
The 1st constituency is located in central part of Békés County.

=== List of municipalities ===
The constituency includes the following municipalities:

1. Békéscsaba
2. Csabaszabadi
3. Csorvás
4. Gerendás
5. Kétegyháza
6. Kétsoprony
7. Kondoros
8. Szabadkígyós
9. Telekgerendás
10. Újkígyós

== History ==
The current 1st constituency of Békés County was created in 2011 and contains the pre-2011 1st constituency and part of the pre-2011 2nd and 3rd constituencies of Békés County. Its borders have not changed since its creation.

== Members ==
The constituency was first represented by Gyula Vantara of the Fidesz from 2014 to 2018. Tamás Herczeg of the Fidesz was elected in 2018 and he was re-elected in 2022. In the 2026 election, István Bodóczi of the Tisza Party was elected representative.

Election	Member	Party	%	Ref.
2014	Gyula Vantara	Fidesz	41.10	
2018	Tamás Herczeg	Fidesz	44.70	
2022	Tamás Herczeg	Fidesz	48.27	
2026	István Bodóczi	Tisza Party	57.44	
