= Békés County =

County of Hungary

Békés County Békés megye
- County
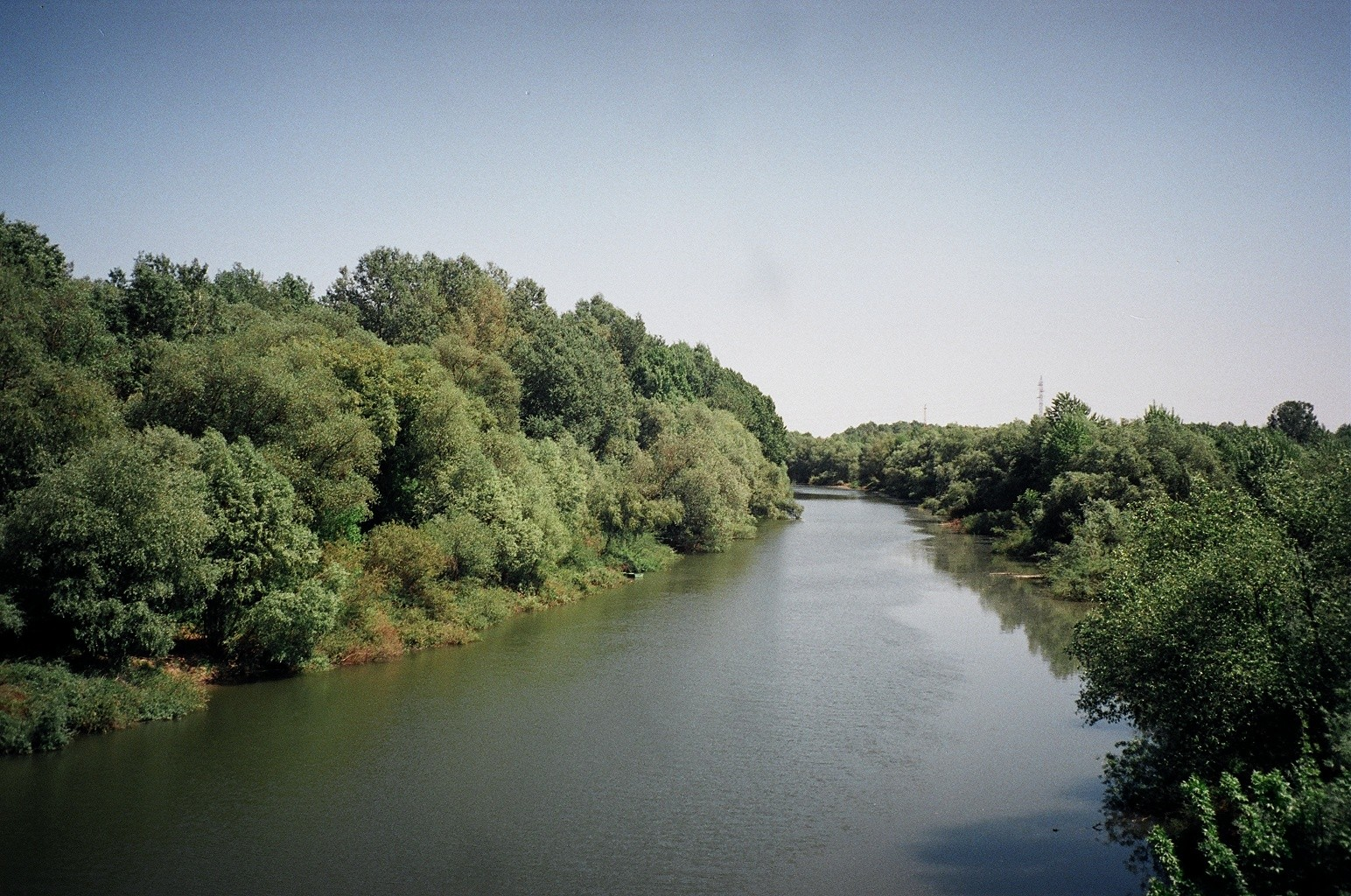
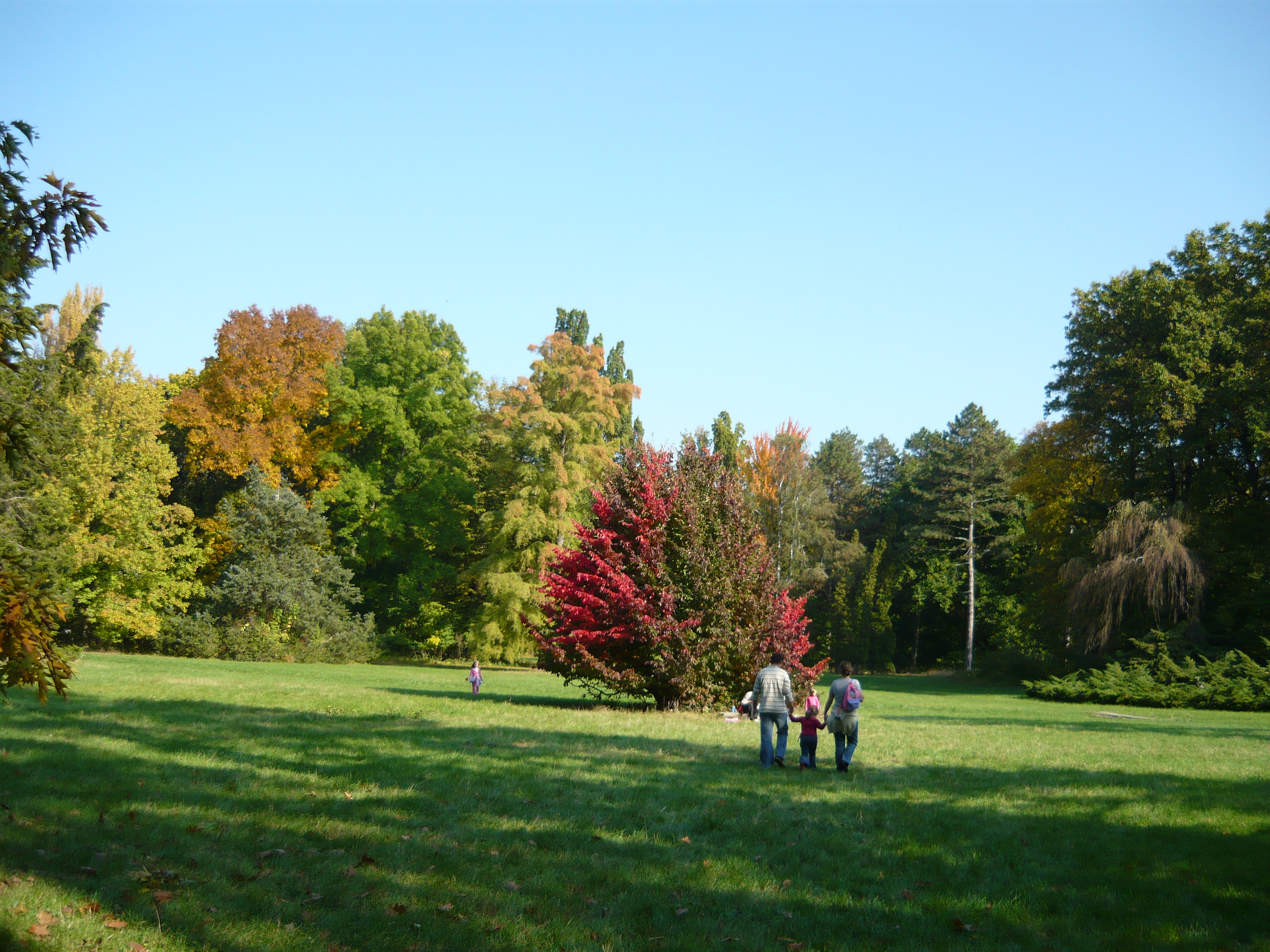
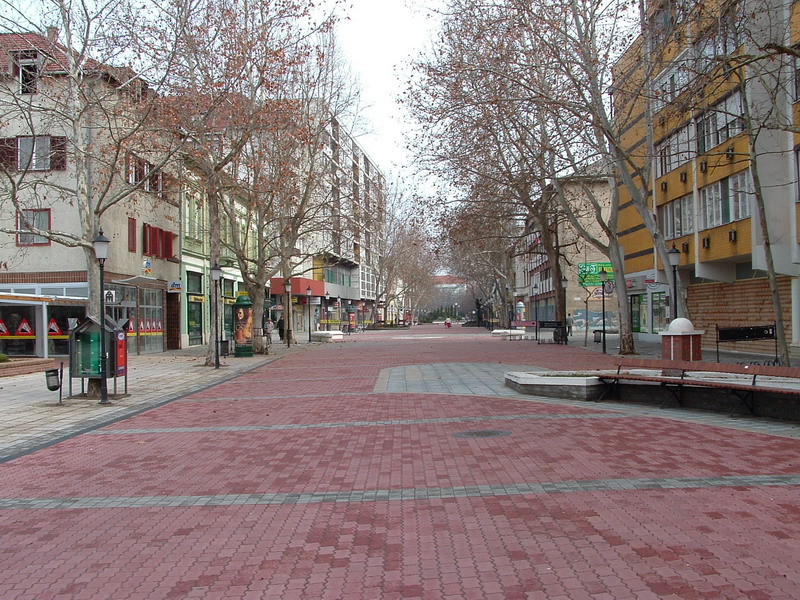
- Descending, from top: Körös river near Mezőberény, Arboretum of Szarvas, and Downtown of Békéscsaba

- Flag Coat of arms

- Békés County within Hungary
- Country: Hungary
- Region: Southern Great Plain
- County seat: Békéscsaba
- Districts: 9 districts: Békéscsaba District; Békés District; Gyomaendrőd District; Gyula District; Mezőkovácsháza District; Orosháza District; Sarkad District; Szarvas District; Szeghalom District

Government
  - President of the General Assembly: Mihály Zalai (Fidesz-KDNP)

Area
  - Total: 5,629.71 km^{2} (2,173.64 sq mi)
  - Rank: 7th in Hungary

Population (2018)
  - Total: 338,025
  - Rank: 11th in Hungary
  - Density: 60.0431/km^{2} (155.511/sq mi)

GDP
  - Total: HUF 748 billion €2.402 billion (2016)
- Postal code: 55xx – 59xx
- Area code(s): (+36) 66, 68
- ISO 3166 code: HU-BE
- Website: bekesmegye.hu

Békés (Hungarian: Békés megye, pronounced [ˈbeːkeːʃ]; Romanian: Județul Bichiș; Serbian: Бекешка жупанија, Slovak: Békešská župa) is an administrative division (county or megye) in south-eastern Hungary, on the border with Romania. It shares borders with the Hungarian counties Csongrád-Csanád, Jász-Nagykun-Szolnok, and Hajdú-Bihar. The capital of Békés county is Békéscsaba. The county is also part of the Danube-Kris-Mures-Tisa euroregion.

== Etymology ==
In Slovak, it is known as Békešská župa and in Romanian as Județul Bichiș.

After Hungarians conquered the area, Békés and its surroundings were the property of the Csolt clan. Békés (the name means "peaceful") was originally the name of the castle which gave its name to the comitatus, and, like many castles, was possibly named after its first steward.

== Geography ==
This county has a total area of 5,630 km^{2} (2,174 sq mi) – 6.05% of Hungary.

Békés County lies on the Pannonian Plain (Great Plain) and is a flat area with good soil. The average rainfall is 645 mm per year. One-fifth of the natural gas resources of Hungary can be found in Békés. The river Körös runs through the county.

=== Neighbours ===
- Hajdú-Bihar County on the north.
- Romania on the east and south – Counties of Arad and Bihor.
- Csongrád-Csanád and Jász-Nagykun-Szolnok County on the west.

== History ==
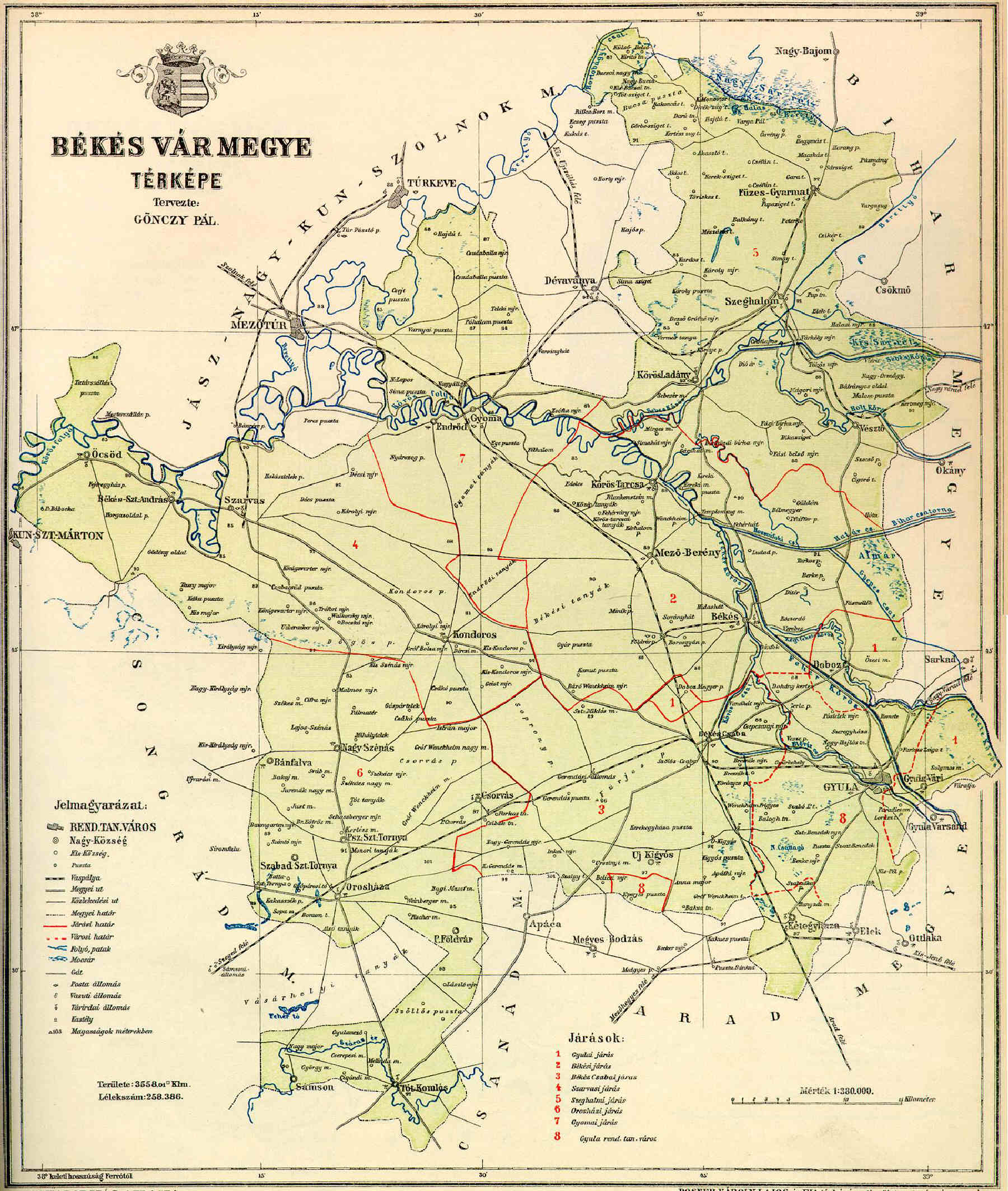
Old county map with settlements, roads an railways

The area has been inhabited since 5000-4000 BC. Before the arrival of the Hungarians several other tribes lived in the area.

The castle of Gyula was built in the early 15th century. Gyula was the most significant town of the county at that time, and became the county seat under Matthias I. It was an important fortress during the Ottoman wars in Europe but it was captured in 1566. During this time, several towns were destroyed in the area.

In the early 18th century, after the Ottomans were expelled, the county was repopulated, not only with Hungarians, but with Slovaks (in the towns Békéscsaba, Endrőd, Szarvas, Tótkomlós), Serbs (Battonya), Germans (Németgyula, Elek), and Romanians (Kétegyháza). Most of the non-Magyar population was assimilated by the mid-19th century.

The agricultural importance of the county and the new railway line between Pest and Békéscsaba (finished in 1858) brought development, which was quickened when Hungary lost its southern territories to Romania after World War I and Békéscsaba had to take over the role of the lost cities.

The population growth peaked in 1950 (472,000), in the same year when Békéscsaba became the county seat. During the following years, the county was industrialized, like most of Hungary, and the population of the cities and towns grew.

== Demographics ==
In 2015, it had a population of 351,148 and the population density was 62/km^{2}.
More than 60% of the population lives in towns.

Historical population

Year	Pop.	±%
1870	284,589	—
1880	310,266	+9.0%
1890	356,665	+15.0%
1900	389,095	+9.1%
1910	417,127	+7.2%
1920	436,348	+4.6%

Year	Pop.	±%
1930	465,557	+6.7%
1941	477,240	+2.5%
1949	471,561	−1.2%
1960	467,861	−0.8%
1970	438,971	−6.2%
1980	436,910	−0.5%

Year	Pop.	±%
1990	411,887	−5.7%
2001	397,791	−3.4%
2011	359,948	−9.5%
2022	315,222	−12.4%

Source: Censuses

=== Ethnicity ===
Religion in Békés County (2022 census – of those who declared their religion (63.0%)
1. Roman Catholic (21.9%)
2. Greek Catholic (0.50%)
3. Calvinistic (16.1%)
4. Lutheran (9.80%)
5. Orthodox (1.20%)
6. Other Christian denomination (3.90%)
7. Other religion (0.30%)
8. Not religious (46.3%)

Besides the Hungarian majority, the main minorities are the Roma (approx. 9,500), Slovak (7,500), Romanian (5,000), German (2,500) and Serb (500).

Total population (2011 census): 359,948
Ethnic groups (2011 census): Identified themselves: 325,597 persons:

- Hungarians: 300,213 (92.20%)
- Gypsies: 9,290 (2.85%)
- Slovaks: 7,267 (2.23%)
- Romanians: 5,137 (1.58%)
- Others and indefinable: 3,690 (1.13%)

Approx. 53,000 persons in Békés County did not declare their ethnic group at the 2011 census.

=== Religion ===
Religious adherence in the county according to 2011 census:

- Catholic – 70,307 (Roman Catholic – 69,478; Greek Catholic – 809);
- Reformed – 46,366;
- Evangelical – 27,870;
- Orthodox – 3,491;
- Other religions – 6,936;
- Non-religious – 113,094;
- Atheism – 4,150;
- Undeclared – 87,734.

== Regional structure ==
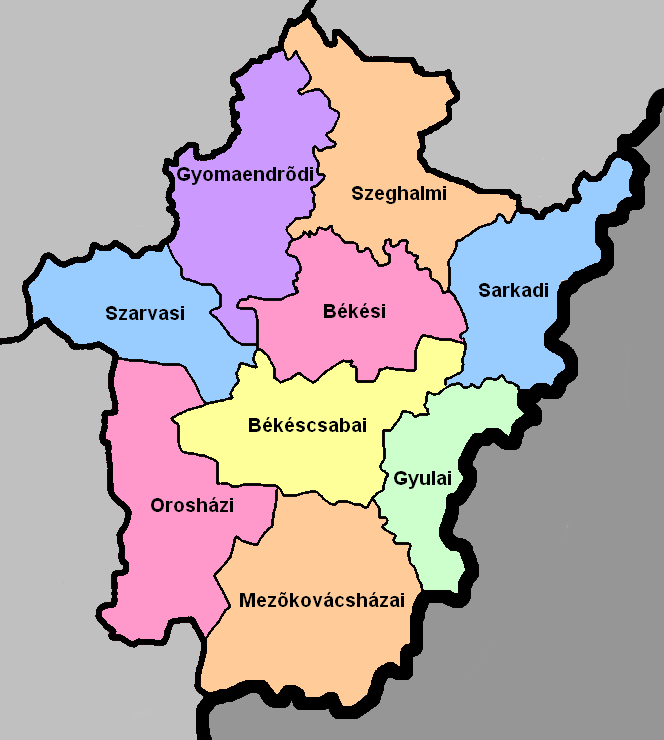
District of Békés County

No.	English and Hungarian names	Area (km^{2})	Population (2011)	Density (pop./km^{2})	Seat	No. of municipalities
1	Békéscsaba District; Békéscsabai járás	636.16	83,541	131	Békéscsaba	9
2	Békés District; Békési járás	525.24	37,409	71	Békés (town)	7
3	Gyomaendrőd District; Gyomaendrődi járás	686.21	23,943	35	Gyomaendrőd	5
4	Gyula District; Gyulai járás	413.22	41,627	101	Gyula	4
5	Mezőkovácsháza District; Mezőkovácsházai járás	881.49	40,550	46	Mezőkovácsháza	18
6	Orosháza District; Orosházi járás	717.18	51,482	72	Orosháza	8
7	Sarkad District; Sarkadi járás	570.97	22,908	40	Sarkad	11
8	Szarvas District; Szarvasi járás	485.06	28,779	59	Szarvas	6
9	Szeghalom District; Szeghalmi járás	714.19	29,709	42	Szeghalom	7
Békés County		5,629.71	359,948	64	Békéscsaba	75

== Politics ==
=== County Assembly ===
The Békés County Council, elected at the 2024 local government elections, is made up of 18 councillors, with the following party composition:

Party	Seats	Current County Assembly
Fidesz-KDNP	9	
Our Homeland Movement	3	
Democratic Coalition	2	
Momentum Movement	2	

==== Presidents of the County Assembly ====
President	Terminus
Mihály Zalai (Fidesz-KDNP)	2014–

=== Members of the National Assembly ===
The following members elected of the National Assembly during the 2022 parliamentary election:

Constituency	Member	Party
Békés County 1st constituency	Tamás Herczeg	Fidesz–KDNP
Békés County 2nd constituency	Béla Dankó	Fidesz–KDNP
Békés County 3rd constituency	József Kovács	Fidesz–KDNP
Békés County 4th constituency	György Simonka	Fidesz–KDNP

== Municipalities ==
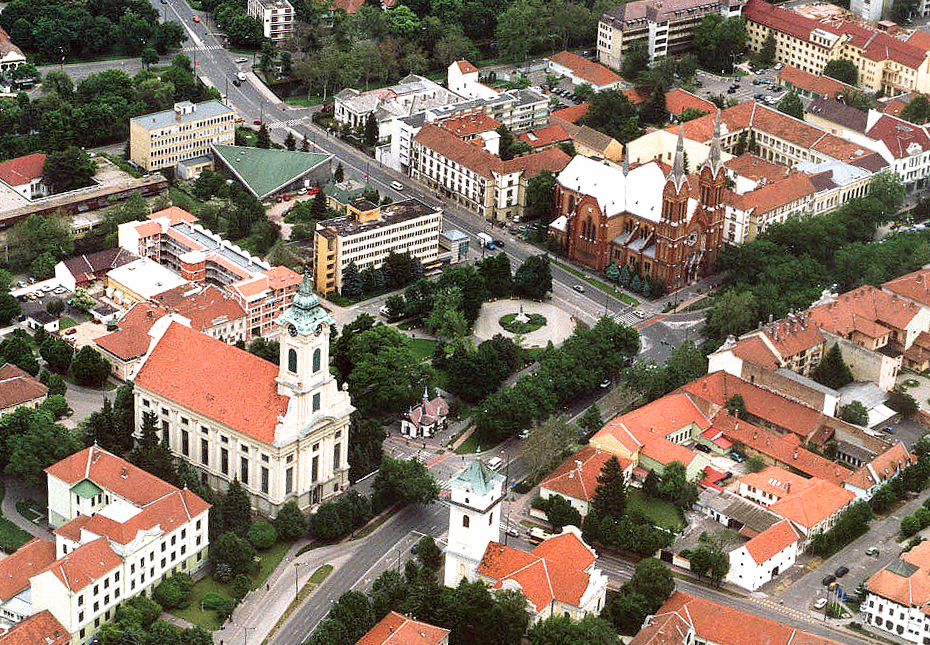
Békéscsaba

Békés County has 1 urban county, 21 towns, 8 large villages and 45 villages.

The regional structure of Békés county is typical of the Great Plain: it has a small number of villages, but those are large, both by area and by population. There are several farmsteads as well. 70% of the population lives in cities and towns, while 17% are in the county seat. A large village network is characteristic of the county which currently has 75 administratively independent settlements, of which 19 are cities and 56 are villages. The oldest towns, and with the largest populations, are: Békéscsaba, the county seat - a city carrying a rank of county right, Orosháza, Gyula, Békés, and Szarvas.

City with county rights

(ordered by population, as of 2011 census)

- Békéscsaba (62,050) – county seat

Towns

- Gyula (31,067)
- Orosháza (29,081)
- Békés (20,088)
- Szarvas (16,956)
- Gyomaendrőd (13,680)
- Mezőberény (10,632)
- Sarkad (10,020)
- Szeghalom (9,290)
- Dévaványa (7,899)
- Vésztő (6,986)
- Mezőkovácsháza (6,177)
- Battonya (6,042)
- Tótkomlós (6,016)
- Füzesgyarmat (5,734)
- Mezőhegyes (5,712)
- Kondoros (5,228)
- Újkígyós (5,196)
- Csorvás (5,060)
- Elek (4,927)
- Körösladány (4,674)
- Medgyesegyháza (3,698)

Villages

- Almáskamarás
- Békéssámson
- Békésszentandrás
- Bélmegyer
- Biharugra
- Bucsa
- Csabacsűd
- Csabaszabadi
- Csanádapáca
- Csárdaszállás
- Doboz
- Dombegyház
- Dombiratos
- Ecsegfalva
- Gádoros
- Gerendás
- Geszt
- Hunya
- Kamut
- Kardos
- Kardoskút
- Kaszaper
- Kertészsziget
- Kevermes
- Kétegyháza
- Kétsoprony
- Kisdombegyház
- Körösnagyharsány
- Köröstarcsa
- Körösújfalu
- Kötegyán
- Kunágota
- Lőkösháza
- Magyarbánhegyes
- Magyardombegyház
- Medgyesbodzás
- Mezőgyán
- Méhkerék
- Murony
- Nagybánhegyes
- Nagykamarás
- Nagylapos
- Nagyszénás
- Okány
- Örménykút
- Pusztaföldvár
- Pusztaottlaka
- Sarkadkeresztúr
- Szabadkígyós
- Tarhos
- Telekgerendás
- Újszalonta
- Végegyháza
- Zsadány

municipalities are large villages.

== Gallery ==
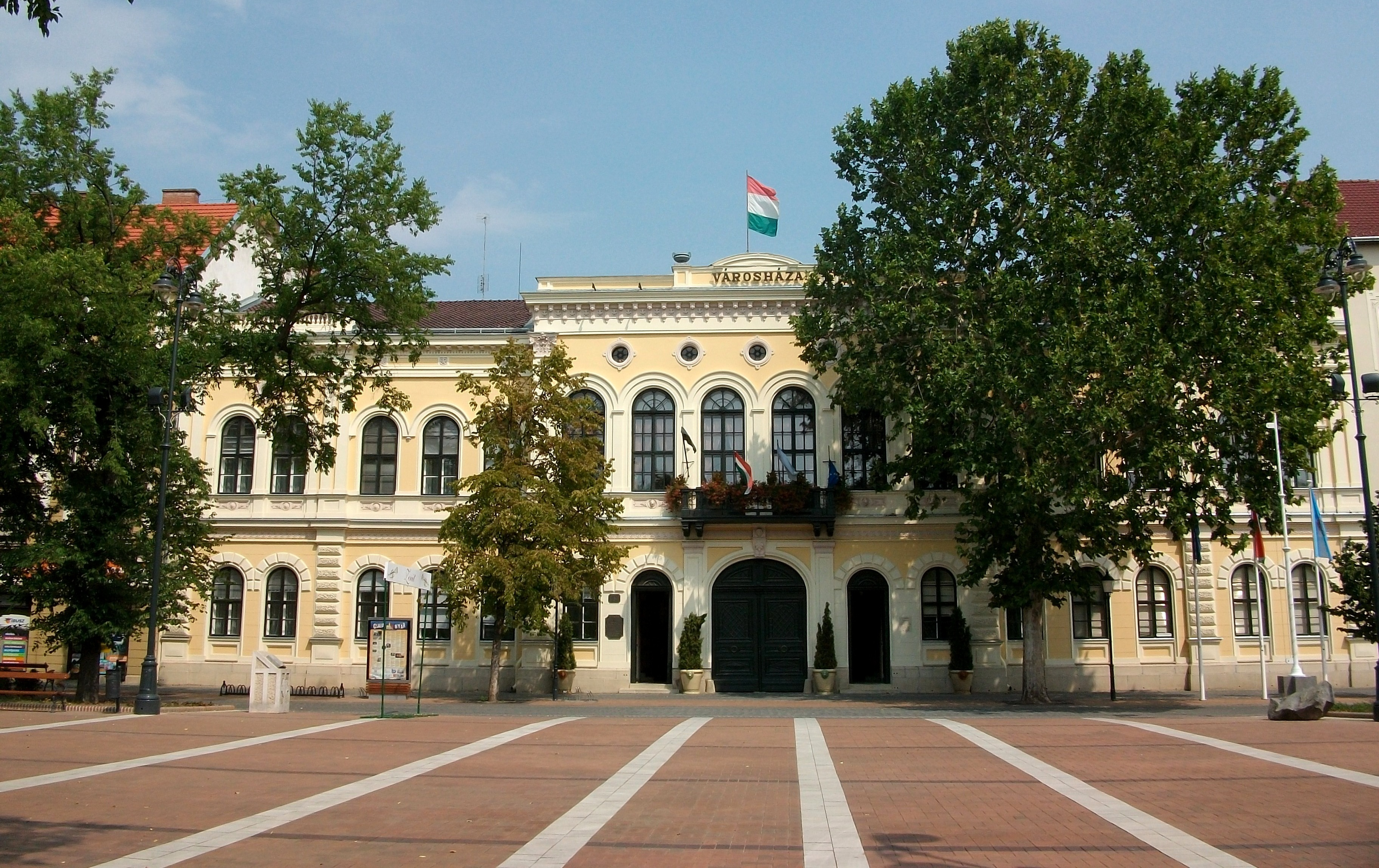
Békéscsaba, the capital of the county

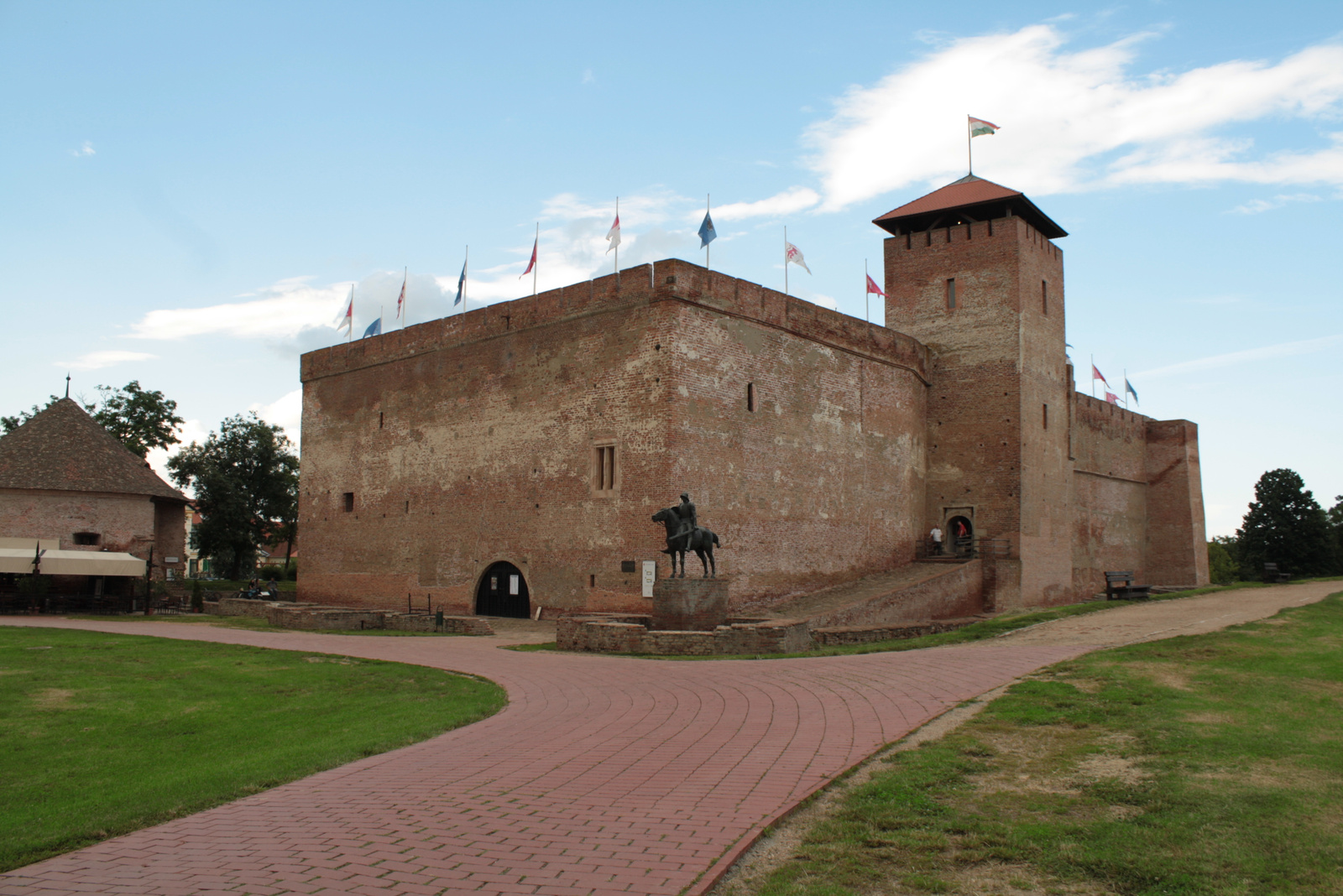
Gyula Castle

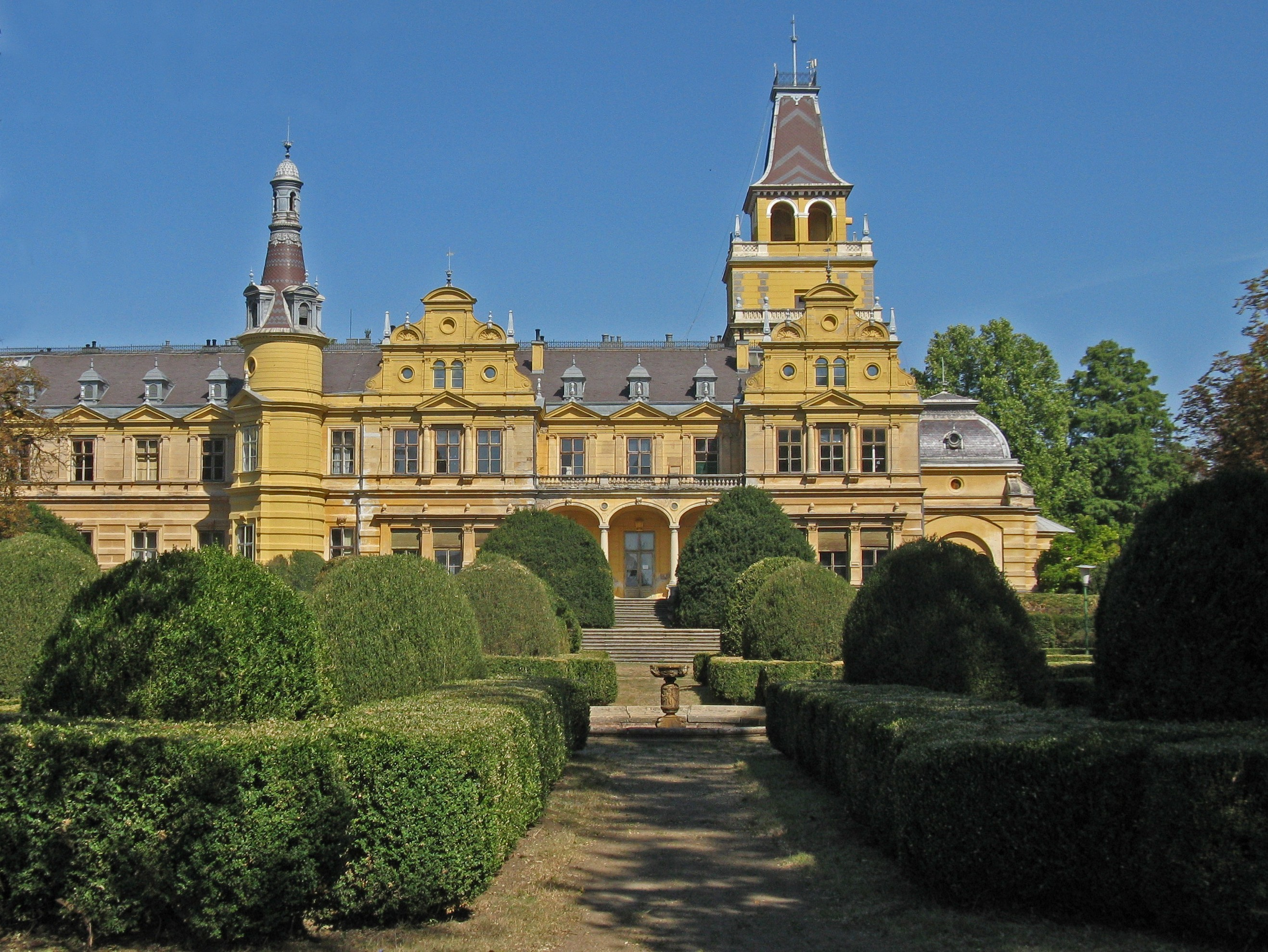
Wenckheim Mansion in Szabadkígyós

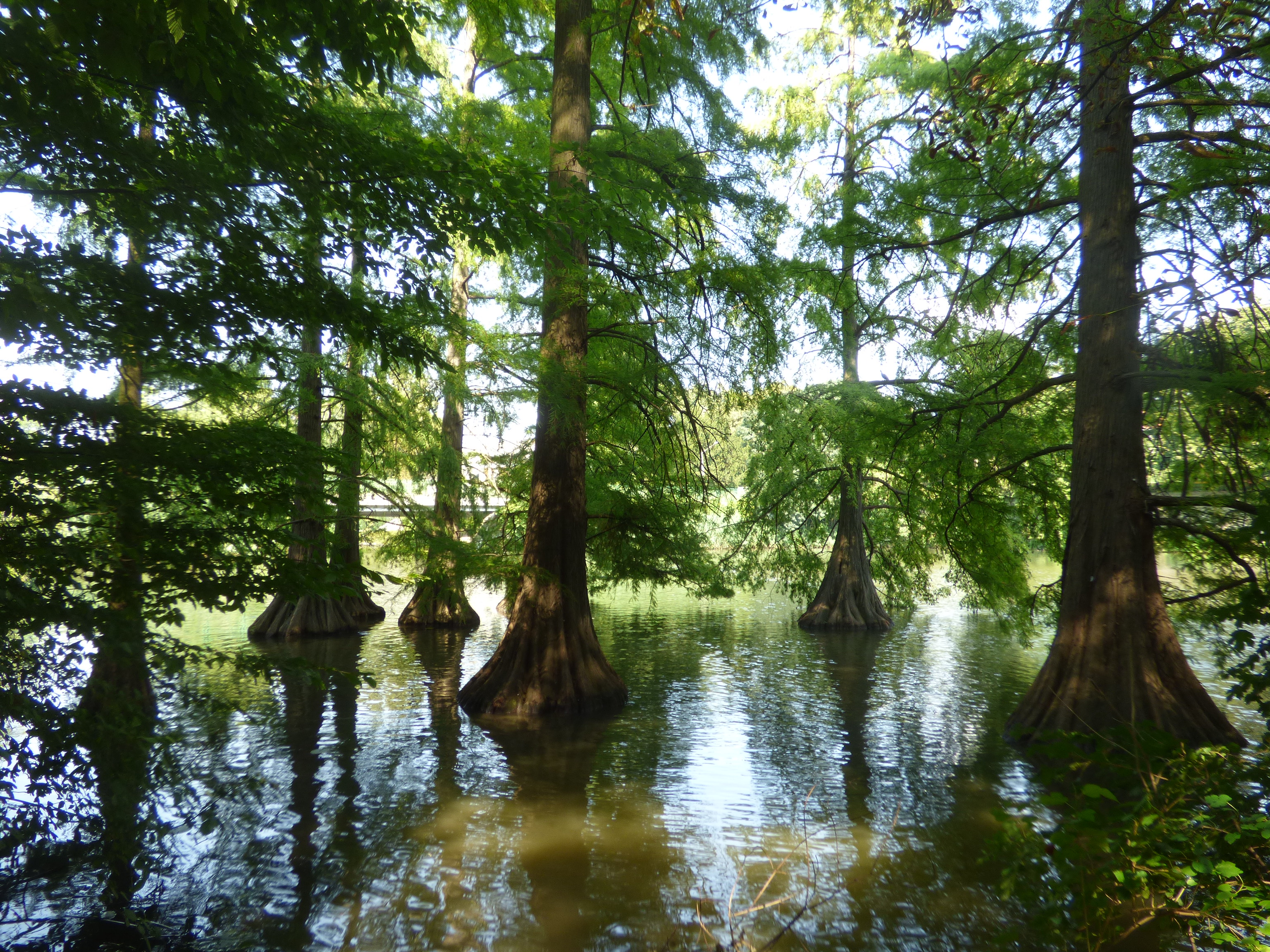
Taxodium in the River Körös

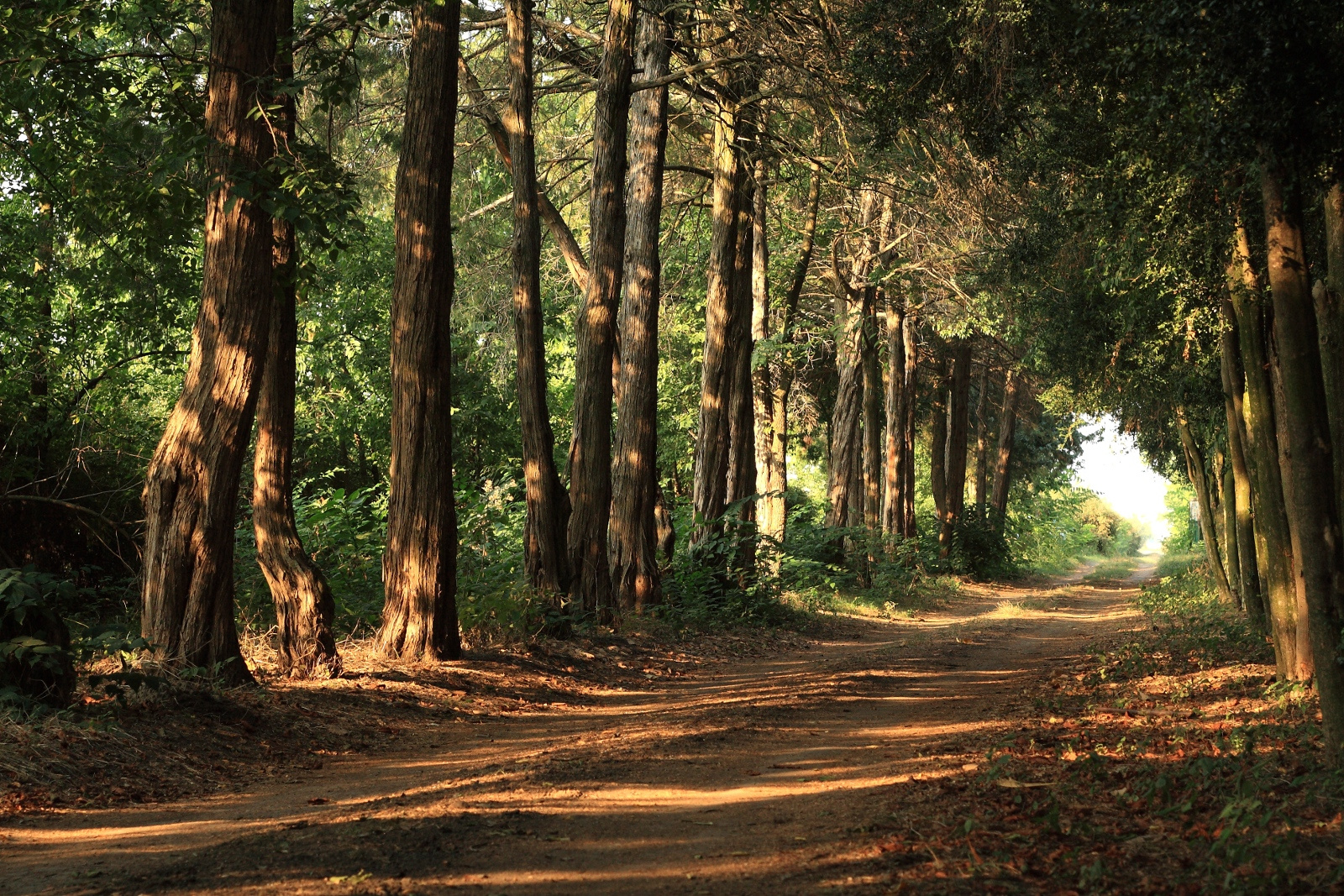
Batthyány Mansion's park in Kondoros

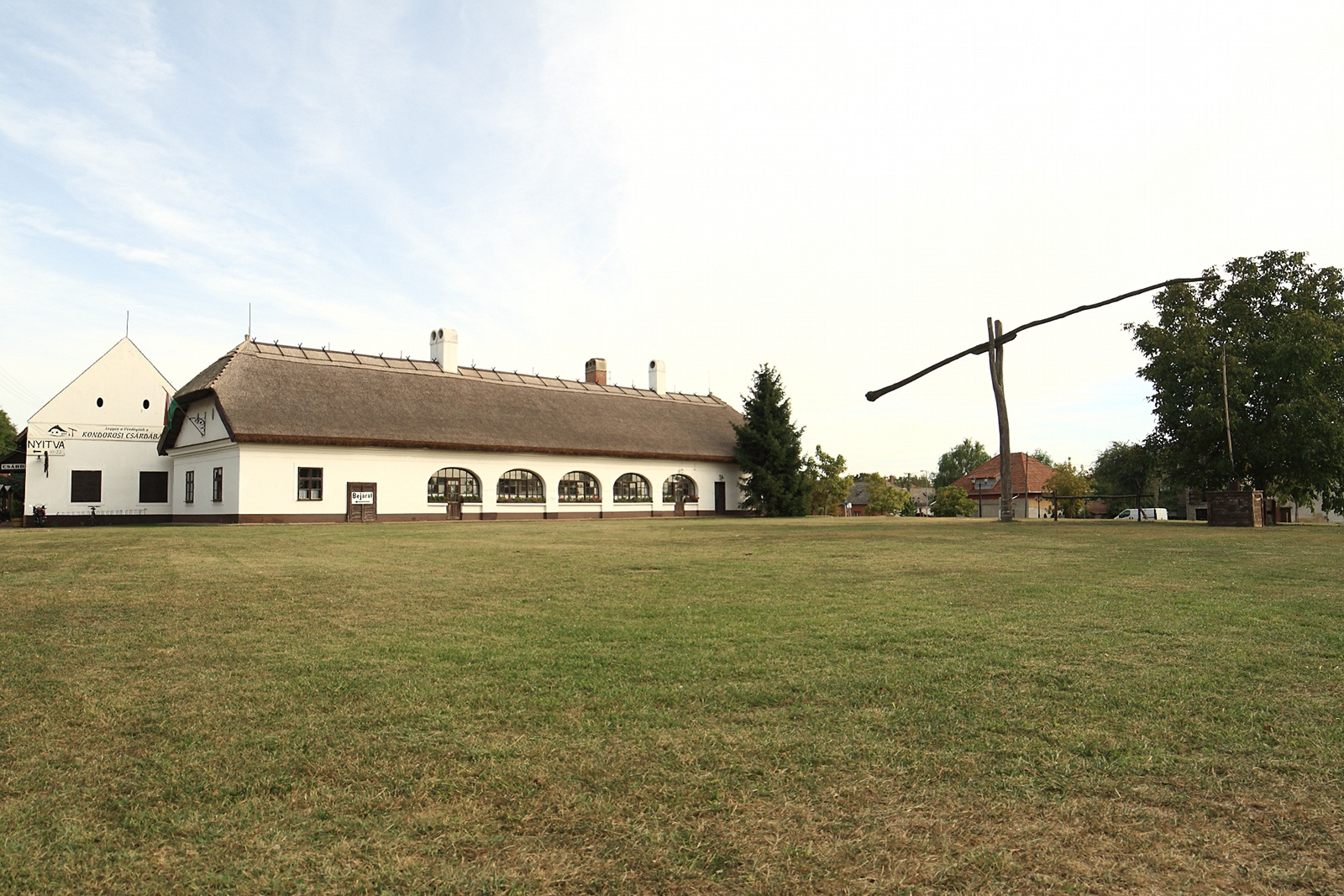
Tavern in Kondoros

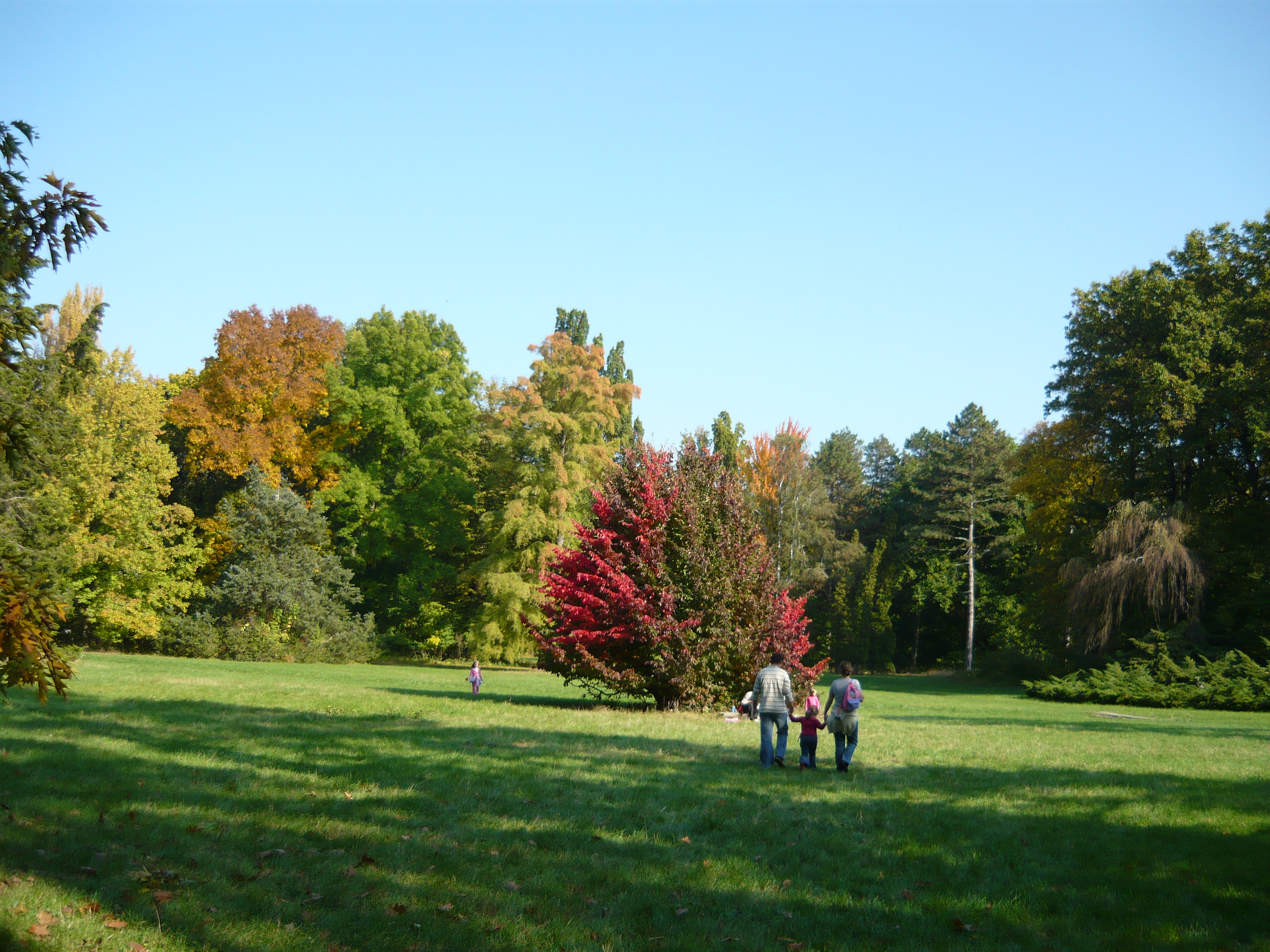
Arboretum in Szarvas

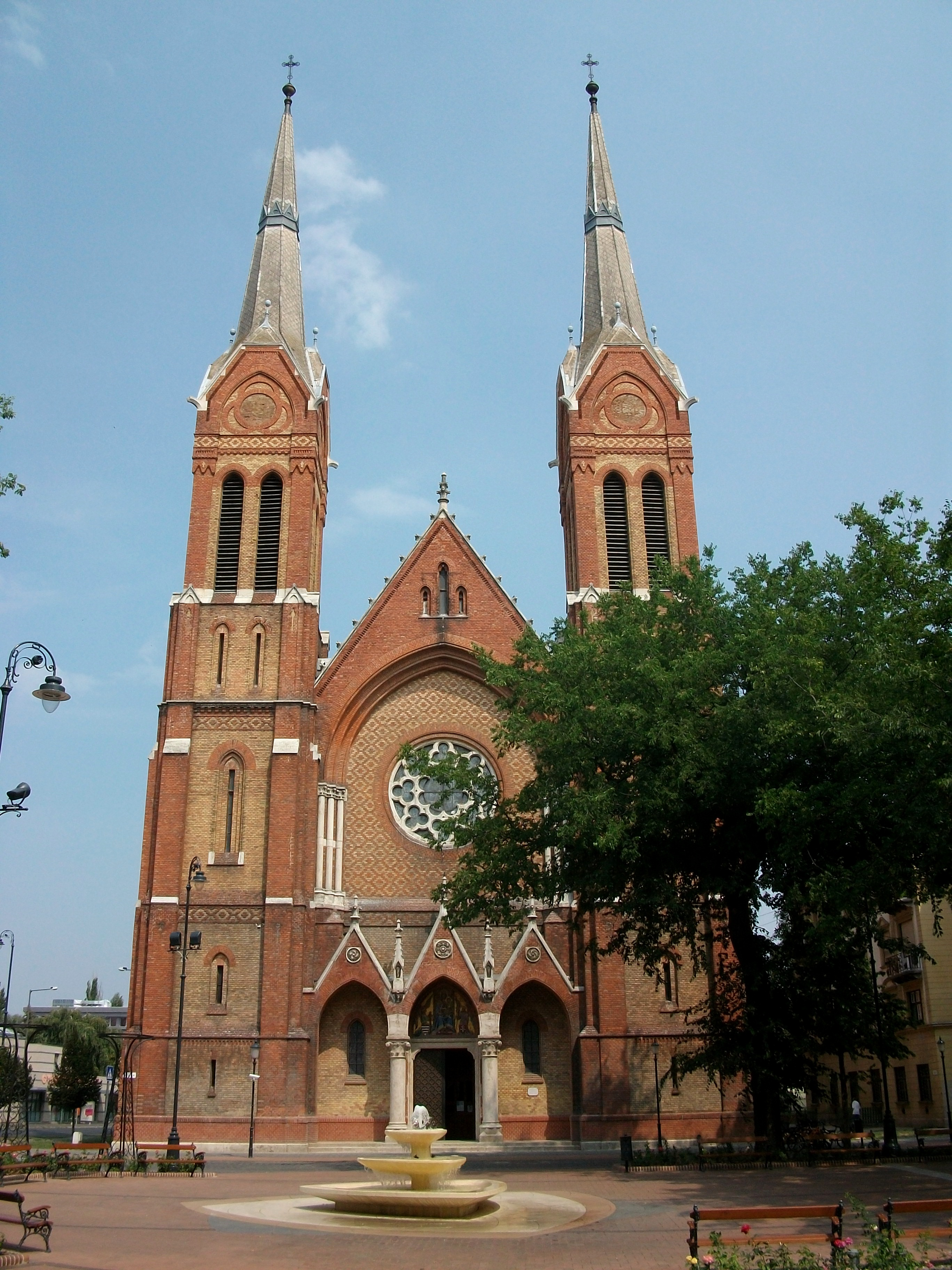
Roman Catholic Church of Békéscsaba

== Notable people ==
Natives of the county include:

- Vilmos Apor, Bishop of Győr
- Endre Bajcsy-Zsilinszky, politician and an important voice
- Zoltán Lajos Bay, physicist, professor, and engineer
- András Balczó, modern pentathlete (olympic champion)
- Béla H. Bánáthy, founder of the White Stag Leadership Development Program
- Ferenc Berényi, painter
- Imre Bródy, physicist
- József Darvas, politician, Minister of Religion and Education (1950-51)
- Albrecht Dürer the Elder, goldsmith in Nuremberg
- Ferenc Erkel, composer, conductor and pianist, father of Hungarian grand opera
- Ágnes Gergely, writer, educator, journalist and translator
- János Jankó, painter and graphicist
- Ferenc Kállai, actor
- István Kiss, architect
- László Krasznahorkai, novelist and screenwriter
- Gyula Kristó, historian
- Menyhért Lakatos, writer
- Gyula Lázár, footballer
- Soma Orlai Petrich, painter
- Henrietta Ónodi, artistic gymnast
- Károly Palotai, association football player and referee
- János Pásztor, academic sculptor
- Paulina Pfiffner, freedom fighter in the Hungarian Revolution of 1848
- George Pomutz, officer during the Hungarian Revolution of 1848 and the American Civil War
- Frigyes Puja, politician, Minister of Foreign Affairs (1973-83)
- Emil Purgly, politician, Minister of Agriculture (1934)
- Kálmán Rózsahegyi, actor and teacher
- Mihály Schéner, sculptor, painter, graphic artist, and ceramist
- Árpád Szendy, pianist, composer and teacher
- Ferenc Szisz, race car driver
- Hajnalka Tóth, fencer (world champion)
- Béla Turi-Kovács, politician, Minister of the Environment (2000-02)
- Béla Wenckheim, politician, Prime Minister (1875)
- Pál Závada, writer

== International relations ==
Békés County has a partnership relationship with:

- Covasna County, Romania
- Harghita County, Romania
- Arad County, Romania
- Bihor County, Romania
