= Kisdombegyház =

Coordinates: 46°22′N 21°06′E

- Interactive map of Kisdombegyház
- Country: Hungary
- County: Békés

Area
  - Total: 12.62 km^{2} (4.87 sq mi)

Population (2015)
  - Total: 467
  - Density: 37/km^{2} (96/sq mi)
- Time zone: UTC+1 (CET)
  - Summer (DST): UTC+2 (CEST)
- Postal code: 5837
- Area code: 68

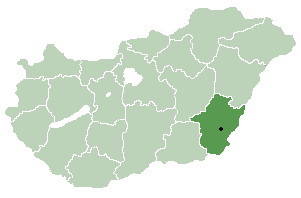
Location of Békés County in Hungary

Kisdombegyház is a village in Békés County, in the Southern Great Plain region of south-east Hungary. Its population was 467 in 2015.

== Location ==
It is located in the southeastern part of the county, in the northern neighborhood of Dombegyház. Its other neighbors are: Dombiratos from the north, Kevermes from the northeast, Battonya from the southwest, and Magyardombegyház from the northwest.

== Population ==
In 2001, nearly 100% of the population of the settlement declared themselves to be of Hungarian nationality.

During the 2011 census, 95.3% of the residents identified themselves as Hungarian, 4.2% as Gypsy, and 3% as Romanian (3% did not declare; due to dual identities, the total may be greater than 100%). The religious breakdown was as follows: Roman Catholic 60.7%, Reformed 8.1%, Lutheran 0.2%, non-denominational 21.9% (4.7% did not declare).

In 2022, 87.9% of the population declared themselves Hungarian, 4.6% Romanian, 1.1% Serbian, 0.3-0.3% German, Armenian, Bulgaria and Slovak, 0.8% other, not of Hungarian nationality (8.8% did not declare; due to dual identities, the total may be greater than 100%). According to their religion, 30% were Roman Catholic, 1.9% Reformed, 0.5% Orthodox, 0.8% other Christian, 0.5% other Catholic, 7.8% Non-denominational (58.4% did not answer).
