= Nagybánhegyes =

Coordinates: 46°28′N 20°54′E

- Interactive map of Nagybánhegyes
- Country: Hungary
- County: Békés

Area
  - Total: 42.26 km^{2} (16.32 sq mi)

Population (2015)
  - Total: 1,224
  - Density: 29/km^{2} (75/sq mi)
- Time zone: UTC+1 (CET)
  - Summer (DST): UTC+2 (CEST)
- Postal code: 5668
- Area code: 68

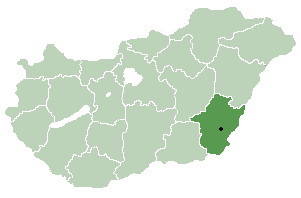
Location of Békés County in Hungary

Nagybánhegyes (Slovak: Slovenský Bánhedeš, Hungarian: Nagy Bán-Hegyes) is a village in Békés County, in the Southern Great Plain region of south-east Hungary.

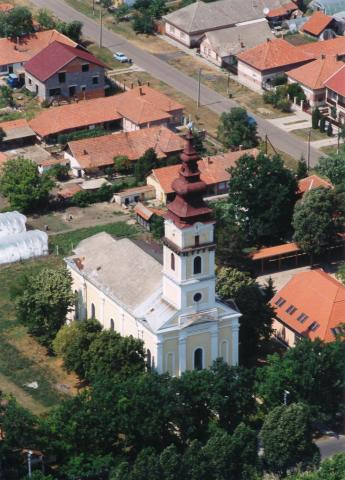
Aerial photography of Nagybánhegyes

== Geography ==
It covers an area of 42.26 km^{2} and has a population of 1224 people (2015).

== Other information ==
Nagybánhegyes is also the place where the mass-production of the Hungarian product, Pöttyös Túri Rudi was started in 1981.

== See also ==
- Magyar-Bánhegyes ("Hungarian Bánhegyes")
