= Almáskamarás =

Coordinates: 46°28′N 21°06′E

- Interactive map of Almáskamarás
- Country: Hungary
- County: Békés

Area
  - Total: 14.76 km^{2} (5.70 sq mi)

Population (2015)
  - Total: 886
  - Density: 627.2/km^{2} (1,624/sq mi)
- Time zone: UTC+1 (CET)
  - Summer (DST): UTC+2 (CEST)
- Postal code: 5747
- Area code: 68

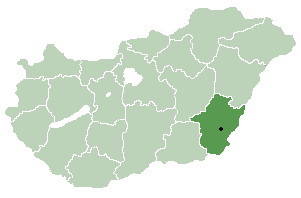
Location of Békés County in Hungary

Almáskamarás is a village in Békés County, in the Southern Great Plain region of south-east Hungary. In 2015, the village had a population of 886.
