= Nagykamarás =

Coordinates: 46°28′N 21°07′E

- Interactive map of Nagykamarás
- Country: Hungary
- County: Békés

Area
  - Total: 43.07 km^{2} (16.63 sq mi)

Population (2015)
  - Total: 1,383
  - Density: 32.1/km^{2} (83/sq mi)
- Time zone: UTC+1 (CET)
  - Summer (DST): UTC+2 (CEST)
- Postal code: 5751
- Area code: 68

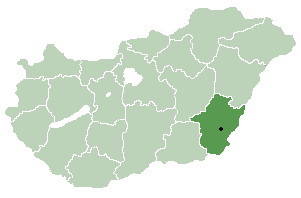
Location of Békés County in Hungary

Nagykamarás (Romanian: Cămărașu Mare) is a village in Békés County, in the Southern Great Plain region of south-east Hungary. In 2015, the village had a population of 1,383.
