= Pusztaföldvár =

Coordinates: 46°32′N 20°48′E

- Interactive map of Pusztaföldvár
- Country: Hungary
- County: Békés

Area
  - Total: 57.15 km^{2} (22.07 sq mi)

Population (2015)
  - Total: 1,662
  - Density: 29.1/km^{2} (75/sq mi)
- Time zone: UTC+1 (CET)
  - Summer (DST): UTC+2 (CEST)
- Postal code: 5919
- Area code: 68

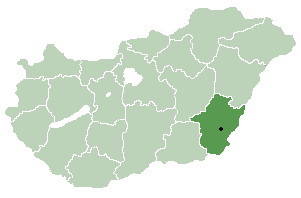
Location of Békés County in Hungary

Pusztaföldvár is a village in Békés County, in the Southern Great Plain region of south-east Hungary. In 2015, the village had a population of 1,662.
