= Zsolt Ráki =

Hungarian politician

Member of the National Assembly
- Assuming office 9 May 2026
- Succeeding: József Kovács
- Constituency: Békés 3rd

Personal details
- Party: Tisza

Zsolt Ráki is a Hungarian politician who was elected member of the National Assembly in 2026 representing the Békés County 3rd constituency. He previously worked as a entrepreneur.
