= Kardoskút =

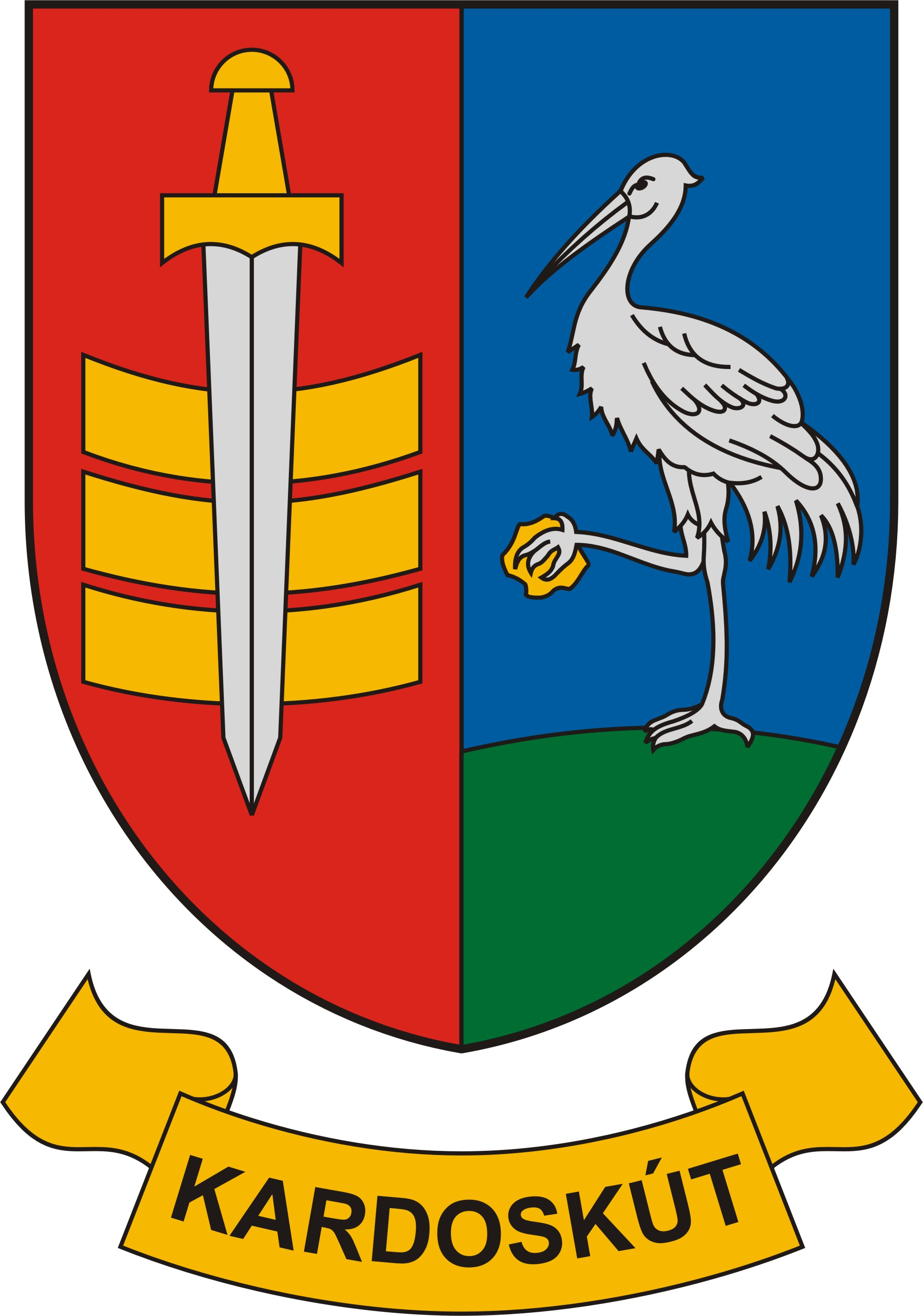
- Coat of arms

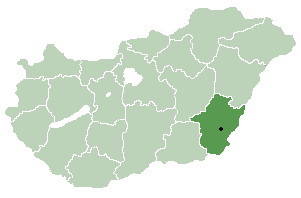
- Location of Békés County in Hungary

- Location within Hungary
- Coordinates: 46°29′N 20°40′E
- Country: Hungary
- County: Békés

Area
  - Total: 76.58 km^{2} (29.57 sq mi)

Population (2015)
  - Total: 913
  - Density: 11.9/km^{2} (30.9/sq mi)
- Time zone: UTC+1 (CET)
  - Summer (DST): UTC+2 (CEST)
- Postal code: 5945
- Area code: (+36) 68
- Website: www.kardoskut.hu

Kardoskút is a village in Békés County, in the Southern Great Plain region of south-east Hungary.

== Geography ==
It covers an area of 76.58 km^{2} (29.57 sq mi) and has a population of 913 people (2015).
