= Végegyháza =

Coordinates: 46°23′N 20°52′E

- Interactive map of Végegyháza
- Country: Hungary
- County: Békés

Area
  - Total: 28.95 km^{2} (11.18 sq mi)

Population (2015)
  - Total: 1,390
  - Density: 48/km^{2} (120/sq mi)
- Time zone: UTC+1 (CET)
  - Summer (DST): UTC+2 (CEST)
- Postal code: 5811
- Area code: 68

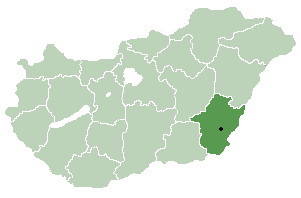
Location of Békés County in Hungary

Végegyháza is a village in Békés County, in the Southern Great Plain region of south-east Hungary.

== Geography ==
It covers an area of 28.95 km^{2} and has a population of 1390 people (2015).
