= Medgyesbodzás =

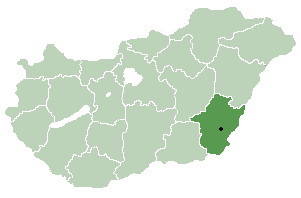
- Location of Békés County in Hungary

- Location in Hungary Location in Europe
- Coordinates: 46.52°N 20.97°E
- Country: Hungary
- County: Békés

Area
  - Total: 31.68 km^{2} (12.23 sq mi)

Population (2002)
  - Total: 1,239
  - Density: 69/km^{2} (180/sq mi)
- Time zone: UTC+1 (CET)
  - Summer (DST): UTC+2 (CEST)
- Postal code: 5663
- Area code: 68

Medgyesbodzás is a village in Békés County, in the Southern Great Plain region of south-east Hungary.

== Geography ==
It covers an area of 31.68 km^{2} (12.23 sq mi) and has a population of 1,239 people (2002). The village is between Csanádapáca and Medgyesegyháza, from the east of Orosháza.

== History ==
Medgyesbodzás was the part of the old Zanard vármegye in the medieval, after that it was the part of Arad vármegye by the Treaty of Trianon. By the country reforming in 1950 it belonged to Csanád-Arad-Torontál megye, after that it moved to Békés megye. The village was founded at 1857 as a garden community. Most of the population were Roman Catholic Hungarian.

== History of the Jewish community ==
In the old Bodzáspuszta Jewish families have already lived before the foundation of the community. At 1890 53 Jewish people lived here. Lajos Löbl and his family, and Ábrahám Buchbinder and his family lived here among the two world war. Dr. Lajos Herzog steeled down in the village before the deportation. They were taken from the Magyarbánhegyes getto, to Auschwitz. Only Lajos Löbl has survived the Holocaust.

== Political life ==
The seven representative including the mayor are consisting the local government of Medgyesbodzás. József Krucsai independent candidate has won the mayor position, at Hungarian local elections in 2014, and six independent representative has won in the village. The deputy mayor has been Laszló Restály, independent representative.

A 2022-es választás eredménye. The Board members:

- Ifj. Varga Gábor, Mayor (independent)
- László Restály, deputy Mayor (independent)
- Erzsébet Mónika Gogucz, (independent)
- Ferenc Győri (independent)
- József Imre Kutasi (independent)
- Aranka Román (independent)
- György Béla Szabó (independent)

There is György Simonka's (member of the National Assembly for Békés County Constituency IV) office. Nonetheless, there is not any Fidesz-KDNP member among the seven representatives. Gabor Varga were the second at the Mayor election, he had gotten 20 votes less. The Fidesz-KDNP's Mayor candidate Gézáné Nagy were the last, less with the 24% of the votes.

== Ethnic groups ==
According to the 2001 census, the population was made up of 99% Hungarians, 1% other (mostly Slovaks and Romanians).
