= Csanádapáca =

Coordinates: 46°33′N 20°53′E

- Interactive map of Csanádapáca
- Country: Hungary
- County: Békés

Area
  - Total: 51.31 km^{2} (19.81 sq mi)

Population (2015)
  - Total: 2,527
  - Density: 49.3/km^{2} (128/sq mi)
- Time zone: UTC+1 (CET)
  - Summer (DST): UTC+2 (CEST)
- Postal code: 5662
- Area code: 68

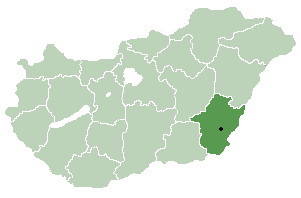
Location of Békés County in Hungary

Csanádapáca is a village in Békés County, in the Southern Great Plain region of south-east Hungary.

In the 19th and 20th centuries, a small Jewish community lived in the village, in 1880 85 Jews lived in the village, most of whom were murdered in the Holocaust.

== Geography ==
It covers an area of 51.31 km^{2} (20 sq mi) and has a population of 2527 people (2015).
