= Kétsoprony =

Coordinates: 46°43′N 20°52′E

- Coat of arms
- Interactive map of Kétsoprony
- Country: Hungary
- County: Békés

Area
  - Total: 51.24 km^{2} (19.78 sq mi)

Population (2013)
  - Total: 1,348
  - Density: 26.3/km^{2} (68/sq mi)
- Time zone: UTC+1 (CET)
  - Summer (DST): UTC+2 (CEST)
- Postal code: 5674
- Area code: 66

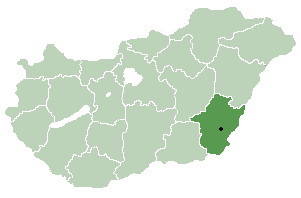
Location of Békés County in Hungary

Kétsoprony is a village in Békés County, in the Southern Great Plain region of south-east Hungary.

== Geography ==
It covers an area of 51.24 km^{2} (20 sq mi) and has a population of 1,348 people (2013 estimate).

== Population ==
Year	1980	1990	2001	2010	2011	2013
Population	1,633 (census)	1,542 (census)	1,559 (census)	1,469 (estimate)	1,359 (census)	1,348 (estimate)
