= Gerendás =

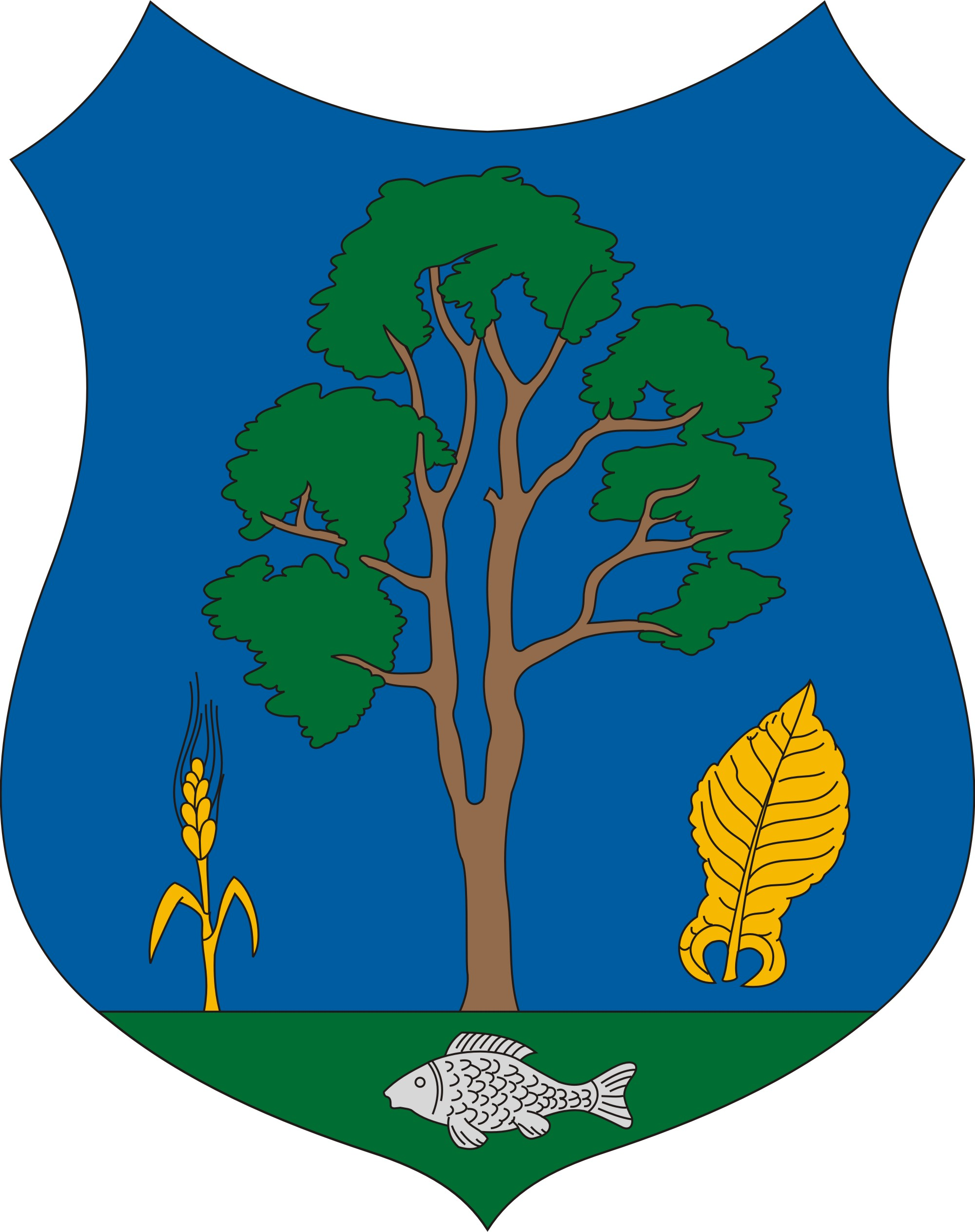
- Coat of arms

- Location within Hungary
- Coordinates: 46°35′49″N 20°51′36″E
- Country: Hungary
- County: Békés

Area
  - Total: 40.78 km^{2} (15.75 sq mi)

Population (2023)
  - Total: 1,049
  - Density: 31/km^{2} (80/sq mi)
- Time zone: UTC+1 (CET)
  - Summer (DST): UTC+2 (CEST)
- Postal code: 5925
- Area code: 66

Gerendás is a village in Békés County, in the Southern Great Plain region of south-east Hungary. The nearest city is Csorvás.

It covers an area of 40.78 km^{2} and has a population of 1576 people (2002).
