= Köröstarcsa =

- Location of Köröstarcsa in Hungary
- Coordinates: 46°52′44″N 21°1′26″E
- Country: Hungary
- County: Békés

Area
  - Total: 62.80 km^{2} (24.25 sq mi)

Population (2015)
  - Total: 2,557
  - Density: 40.7/km^{2} (105/sq mi)
- Time zone: UTC+1 (CET)
  - Summer (DST): UTC+2 (CEST)
- Postal code: 5622
- Area code: 66

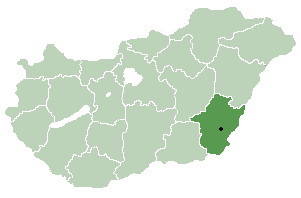
Location of Békés County in Hungary

Köröstarcsa is a village in Békés County, in the Southern Great Plain region of south-east Hungary.

== Geography ==
It covers an area of 62.83 km^{2} and has a population of 2557 people (2015).
