= Hunya =

Coordinates: 46°49′N 20°51′E

- Interactive map of Hunya
- Country: Hungary
- County: Békés

Area
  - Total: 32.59 km^{2} (12.58 sq mi)

Population (2015)
  - Total: 649
  - Density: 19.9/km^{2} (52/sq mi)
- Time zone: UTC+1 (CET)
  - Summer (DST): UTC+2 (CEST)
- Postal code: 5555
- Area code: 66

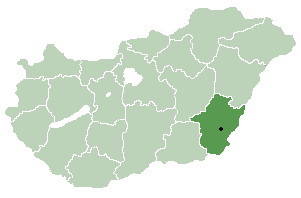
Location of Békés County in Hungary

Hunya is a village in Békés County, in the Southern Great Plain region of south-east Hungary.

== Geography ==
It covers an area of 32.59 km^{2} and has a population of 649 people (2015).
