= Kamut, Hungary =

Coordinates: 46°46′N 20°59′E

Kamut
- Interactive map of Kamut
- Country: Hungary
- County: Békés

Area
  - Total: 60.48 km^{2} (23.35 sq mi)

Population (2015)
  - Total: 1,003
  - Density: 16.6/km^{2} (43/sq mi)
- Time zone: UTC+1 (CET)
  - Summer (DST): UTC+2 (CEST)
- Postal code: 5673
- Area code: 66

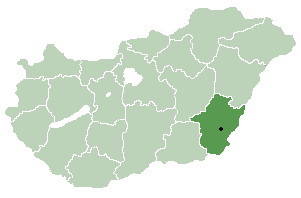
Location of Békés County in Hungary

Kamut is a village in Békés County, in the Southern Great Plain region of south-east Hungary.

== Geography ==
It covers an area of 60.48 km^{2} and has a population of 1003 people (2015).
