= Nagylapos =

Coordinates: 46.975°N 20.743°E

Nagylapos is a village situated in the peaceful Kálmánháza Nagylapos in Bekes County, Hungary, located near the city of Gyomaendrőd and Hortobágy National Park. The name Nagylapos means "great flatness" and arises from the town's location on the Great Hungarian Plain. The town has 172 permanent residents.

Nagylaposnak railway station is located on the Budapest–Szolnok–Békéscsaba–Lőkösháza railway line, and the town adjoins the Hortobágy National Park. The town is known for birkapörkölt (mutton stew) a local specialty.

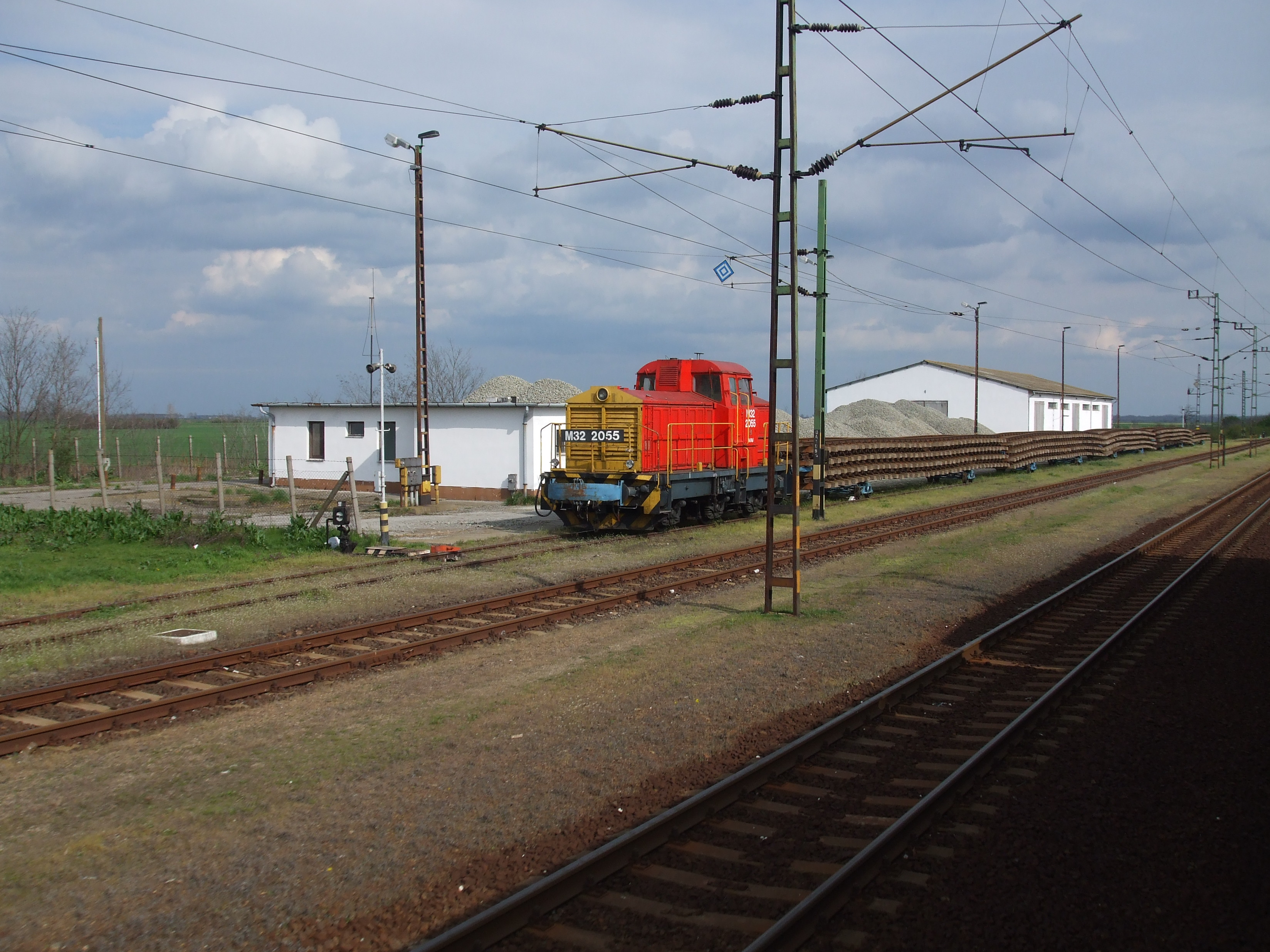
Railway line

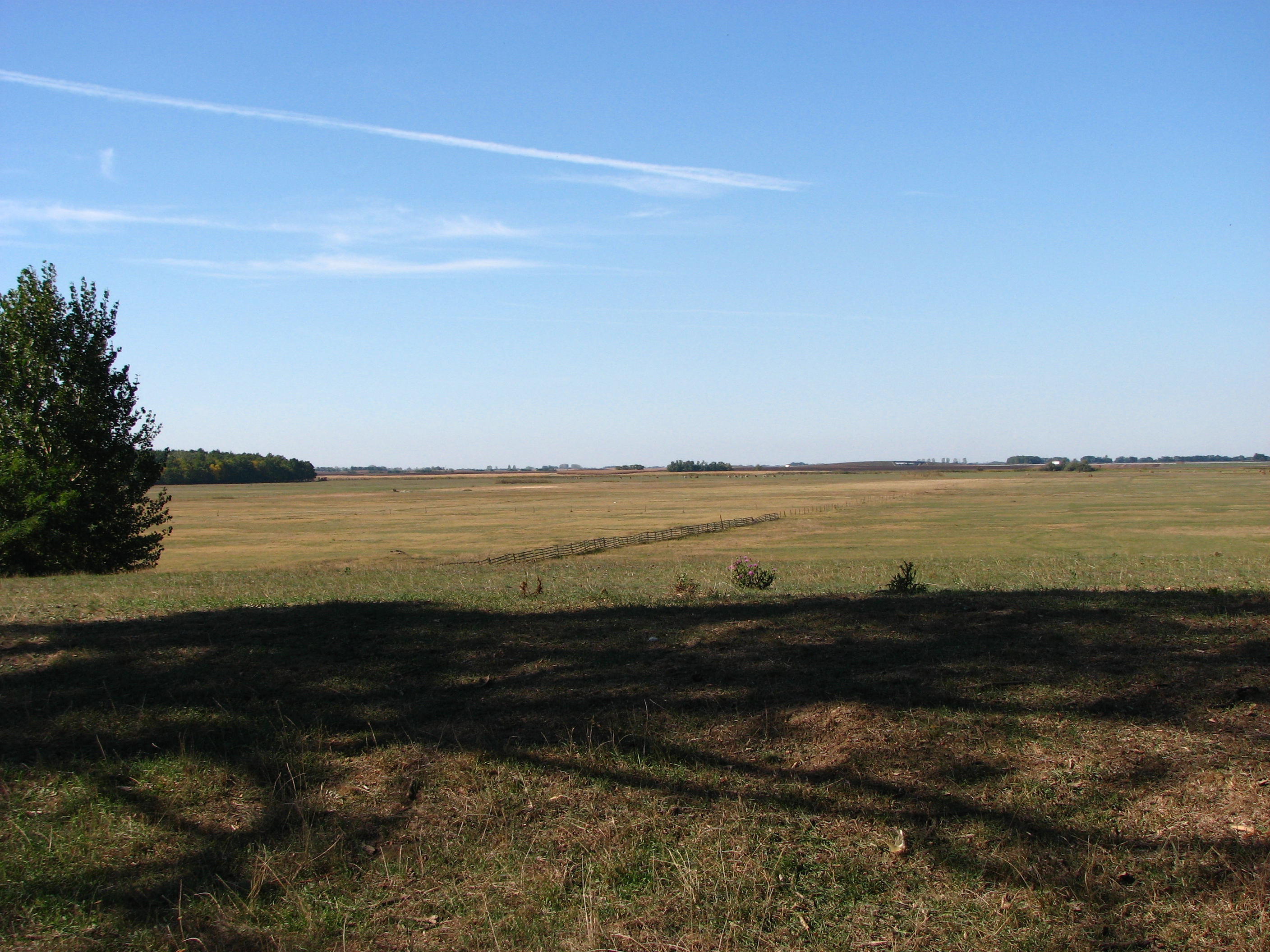
Great Hungarian Plain near Nagylapos
