= Mezőgyán =

Coordinates: 46°52′N 21°32′E

- Interactive map of Mezőgyán
- Country: Hungary
- County: Békés

Area
  - Total: 59.90 km^{2} (23.13 sq mi)

Population (2015)
  - Total: 1,058
  - Density: 17.7/km^{2} (46/sq mi)
- Time zone: UTC+1 (CET)
  - Summer (DST): UTC+2 (CEST)
- Postal code: 5732
- Area code: 66

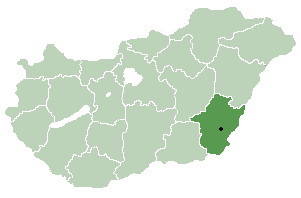
Location of Békés County in Hungary

Mezőgyán is a village in Békés County, in the Southern Great Plain region of south-east Hungary. It covers an area of 59.9 km^{2} and has a population of 1,058 people (2015).
