= Sarkadkeresztúr =

Coordinates: 46°48′N 21°23′E

- Interactive map of Sarkadkeresztúr
- Country: Hungary
- County: Békés

Area
  - Total: 35.33 km^{2} (13.64 sq mi)

Population (2015)
  - Total: 1,509
  - Density: 42.7/km^{2} (111/sq mi)
- Time zone: UTC+1 (CET)
  - Summer (DST): UTC+2 (CEST)
- Postal code: 5731
- Area code: 66

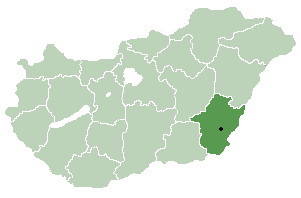
Location of Békés County in Hungary

Sarkadkeresztúr (Romanian: Crâstor) is a village in Békés County, in the Southern Great Plain region of south-east Hungary.

== Geography ==
It covers an area of 35.33 km² and has a population of 1509 people (2015).

== Population ==
The population of the village started increasing rapidly because of the settling of the Germans. The village was inhabited by mostly Jewish Germans. Many Germans were deported from today's Germany to Hungary during the 19th century. The new immigrants were settled from the German regions of Swabia and Bavaria.

According to the 2015 Census, the ethnic composition of the village were; 97% Hungarians and 3% Germans.

(There are some other towns and villages where German (mostly Swabian) communities still can be found, just like Elek, Gyula and more.)

== Religion ==
The village has always had many Christian community. Back in the 19th century, the two major religions were Christianity and Judaism.

According to the 1910 census, there were 60% Christians and 40% Jews. Although, the Jewish population increased faster and rapidly than the Christian, therefore the local Jews were the majority in 1933 (57% Jewish and 43 Christians). After the year 1944, Christians has become the majority in the village.

Religious composition according to the 2015 census: 88% Hungarian Reformed, 5% Evangelical, 5% Jews, 2% Catholic.

== Jewish community ==
Many Jewish communities had lived in the village in the 19th century, before the local Jews were deported to the Nazi Germany in 1944. The local Jews had a good relationship with the Sarkadian Jewish community. The Jews also could enjoy and practise their religion in a local Jewish synagogue.
