= Biharugra =

- Coat of arms

- Location within Hungary
- Coordinates: 46°58′N 21°36′E
- Country: Hungary
- County: Békés

Area
  - Total: 52.87 km^{2} (20.41 sq mi)

Population (2015)
  - Total: 945
  - Density: 17.9/km^{2} (46/sq mi)
- Time zone: UTC+1 (CET)
  - Summer (DST): UTC+2 (CEST)
- Postal code: 5538
- Area code: 66

Biharugra is a village in Békés County, in the Southern Great Plain region of south-east Hungary.

== Geography ==
It covers an area of 52.87 km^{2} and has a population of 945 people (2015).

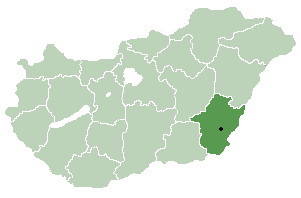
Location of Békés County in Hungary
