= Paulina Pfiffner =

Hungarian freedom fighter

- Born: 1825; Mezőhegyes, Hungary
- Died: September 29, 1853 (aged 27–28); Gyula, Hungary
- Other names: Ligeti Kalman

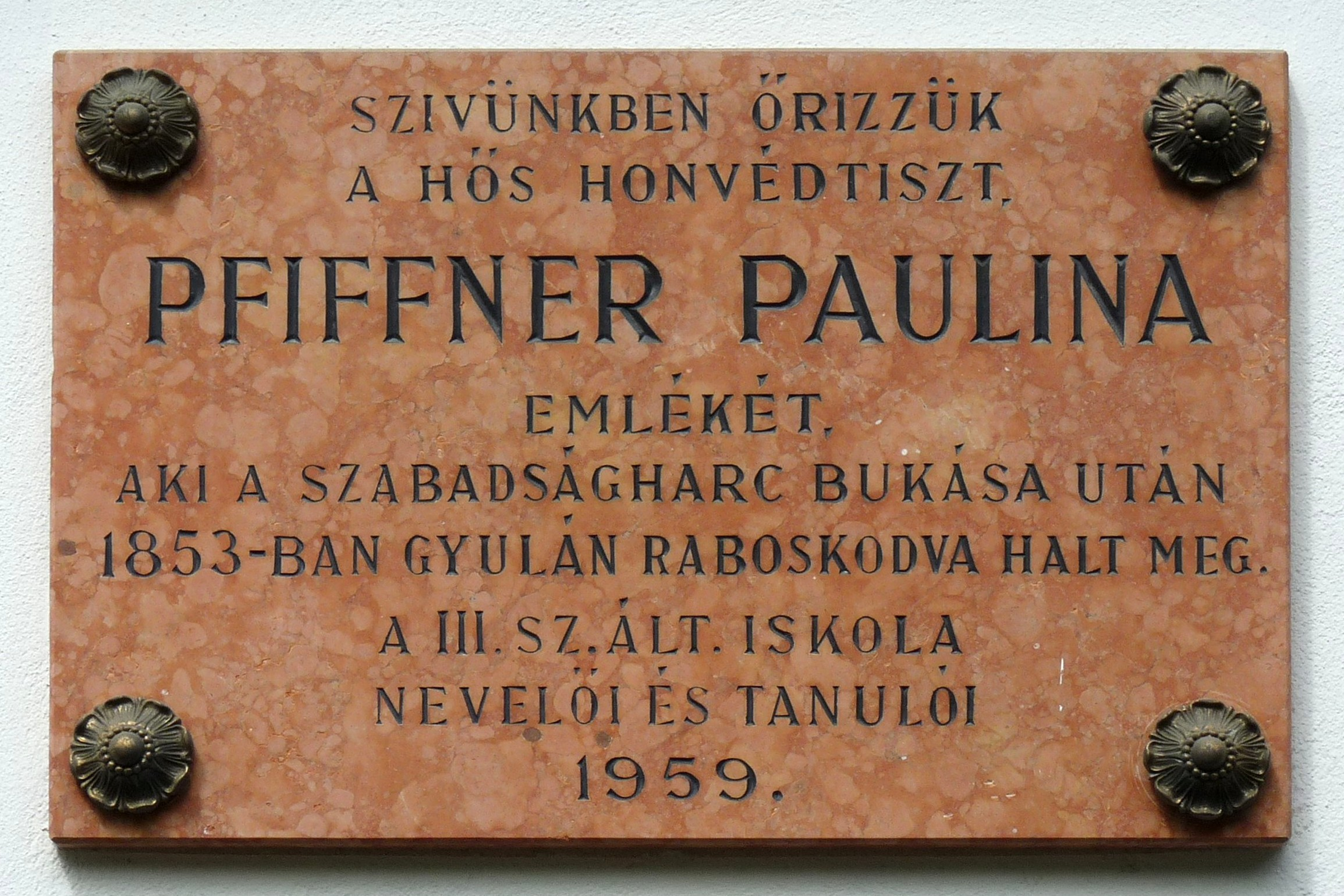
Commemorative plaque to Ms. Paulina Pfiffner (c. 1825-1853) Honved officer during the 1848-49 war of independence. The plate is affixed to the front of the building in which she was held by the Austrian gendarme in 1953. (Gyula, Kossuth Lajos Street Nr 36)

Paulina Pfiffner (1825 – 29 September 1853), was a Hungarian freedom fighter in the Hungarian Revolution of 1848.

Paulina's father was a Pole, while her mother was Italian; Paulina herself was born in Hungary. In 1840, she ran away from home to become an actor in Budapest. In 1848, she enlisted in the Hungarian forces dressed as a man under the name Ligeti Kalman. She was promoted to officer after having distinguished herself by her bravery during the Battle of Piski.
