= Örménykút =

Örménykút Irminčok
- Coat of arms

- Örménykút in Hungary
- Coordinates: 46°49′50″N 20°44′12″E
- Country: Hungary
- County: Békés

Area
  - Total: 54.56 km^{2} (21.07 sq mi)

Population (2024)
  - Total: 283
  - Density: 6.38/km^{2} (16.5/sq mi)
- Time zone: UTC+1 (CET)
  - Summer (DST): UTC+2 (CEST)
- Postal code: 5556
- Area code: 66
- Website: https://ormenykut.hu/

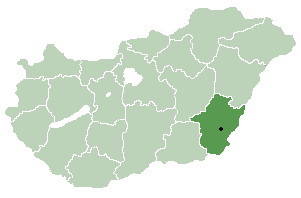
Location of Békés County in Hungary

Örménykút (Slovak: Irminčok) is a village in Békés County, in the Southern Great Plain region of south-east Hungary.

== Geography ==
It covers an area of 54.56 km² and has a population of 283 people (2024).
