= Telekgerendás =

Coordinates: 46°39′N 20°58′E

- Interactive map of Telekgerendás
- Country: Hungary
- County: Békés

Area
  - Total: 72.37 km^{2} (27.94 sq mi)

Population (2015)
  - Total: 1,418
  - Density: 19.6/km^{2} (51/sq mi)
- Time zone: UTC+1 (CET)
  - Summer (DST): UTC+2 (CEST)
- Postal code: 5675
- Area code: 66

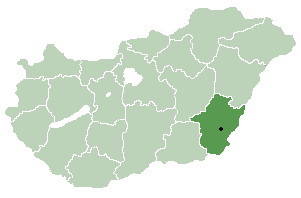
Location of Békés County in Hungary

Telekgerendás is a small village in Békés County, in the Southern Great Plain region of south-east Hungary.

== Geography ==
It covers an area of 72.37 km^{2} and has a population of 1418 people (2015).
