= Murony =

Coordinates: 46°46′N 21°03′E

- Interactive map of Murony
- Country: Hungary
- County: Békés

Area
  - Total: 35.68 km^{2} (13.78 sq mi)

Population (2015)
  - Total: 1,200
  - Density: 33.6/km^{2} (87/sq mi)
- Time zone: UTC+1 (CET)
  - Summer (DST): UTC+2 (CEST)
- Postal code: 5672
- Area code: 66

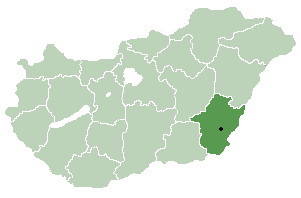
Location of Békés County in Hungary

Murony is a village in Békés County, in the Southern Great Plain region of south-east Hungary. In 1950 it became a completely independent village.

== Geography ==
It covers an area of 35.68 km² and has a population of 1200 people (2015).
