= Körösújfalu =

Coordinates: 46°58′N 21°24′E

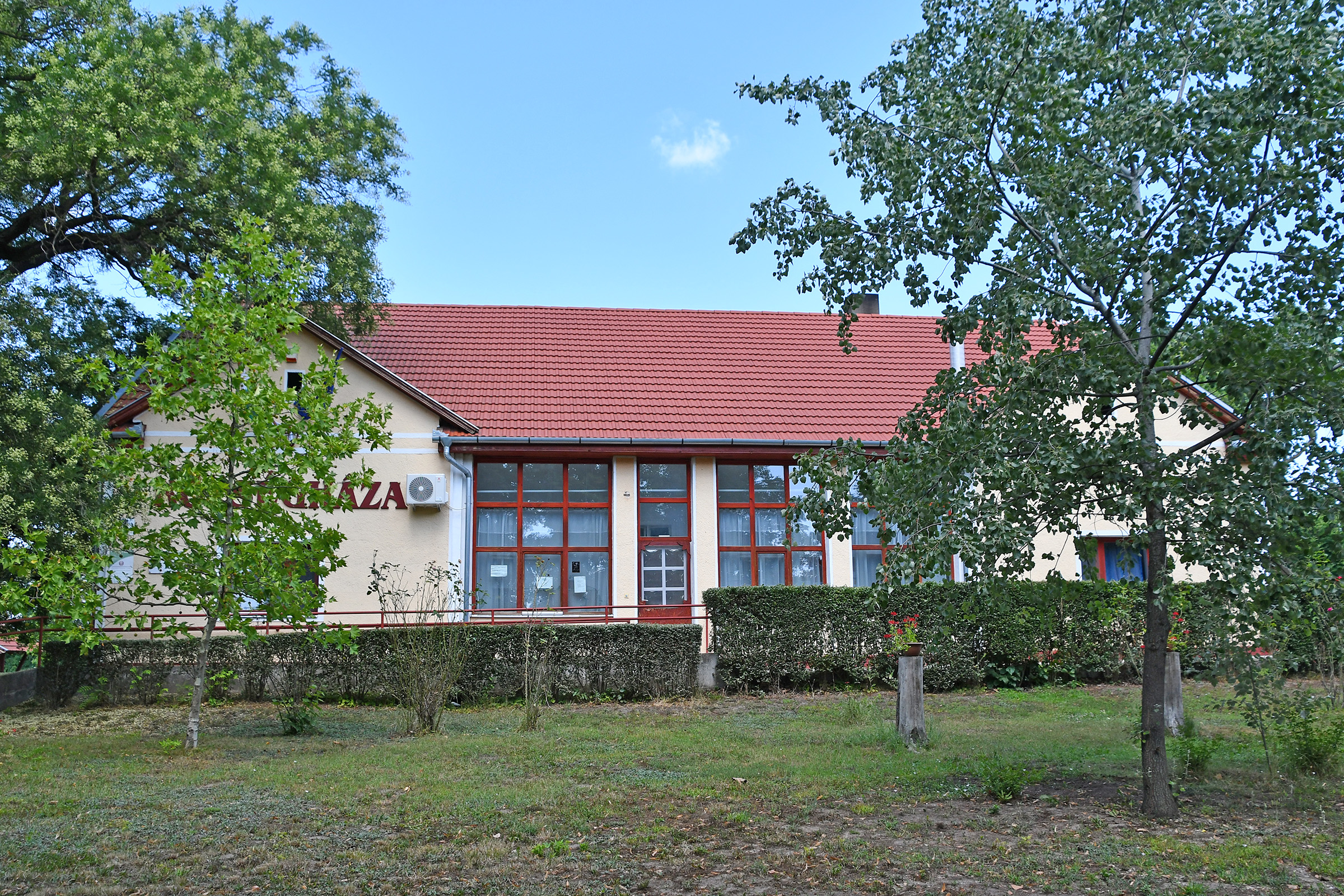
- Village hall
- Interactive map of Körösújfalu
- Country: Hungary
- County: Békés

Area
  - Total: 25.31 km^{2} (9.77 sq mi)

Population (2015)
  - Total: 448
  - Density: 17.7/km^{2} (46/sq mi)
- Time zone: UTC+1 (CET)
  - Summer (DST): UTC+2 (CEST)
- Postal code: 5536
- Area code: 66

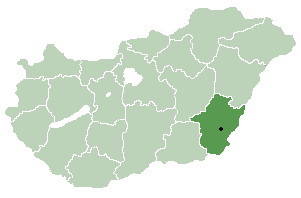
Location of Békés County in Hungary

Körösújfalu is a village in Békés County, in the Southern Great Plain region of south-east Hungary. It is situated along the Crișul Repede.

== Geography ==
It covers an area of 25.31 km^{2} and has a population of 448 people (2015).
