= Magyardombegyház =

Coordinates: 46°23′N 21°04′E

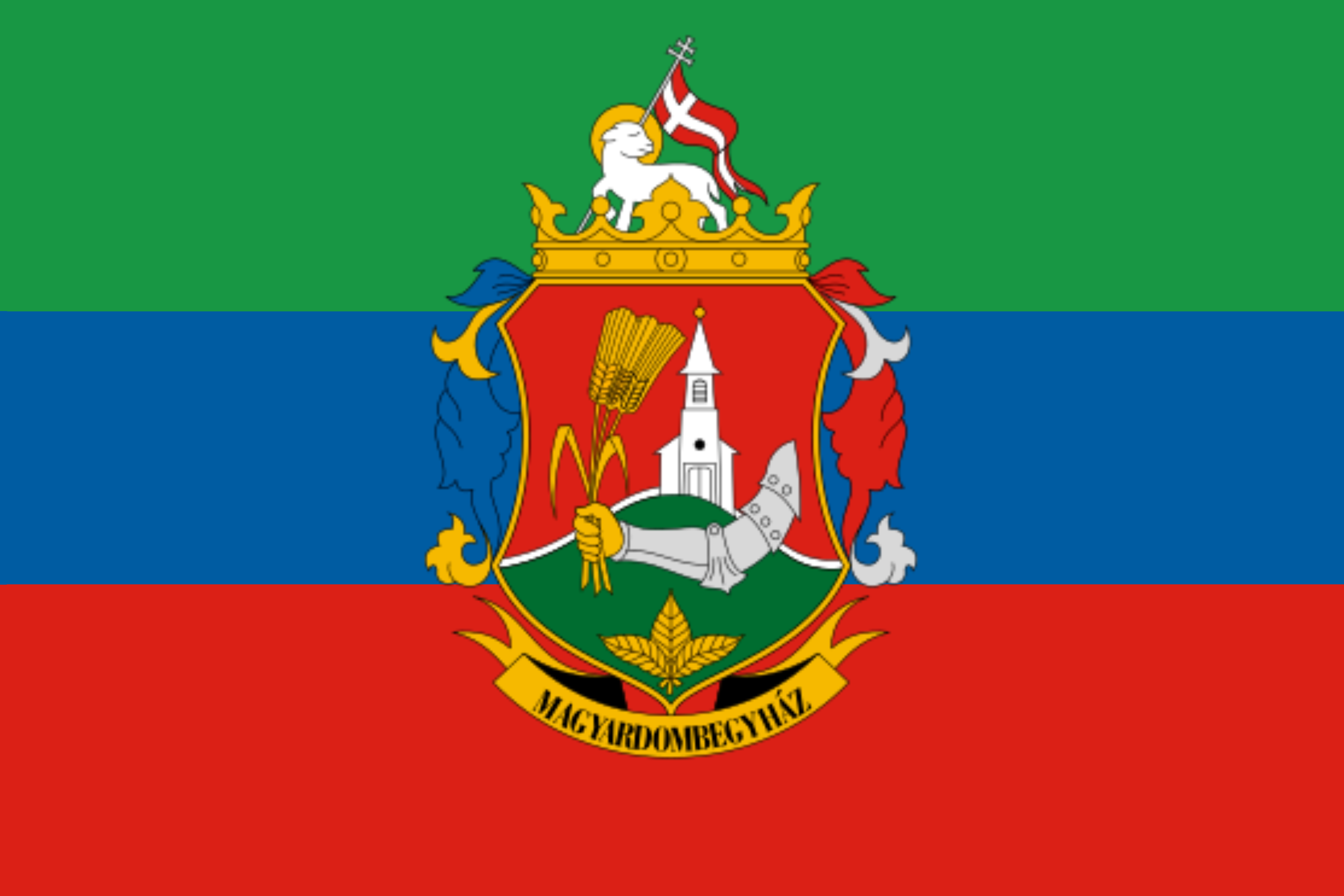
- Flag
- Interactive map of Magyardombegyház
- Country: Hungary
- County: Békés

Area
  - Total: 7.64 km^{2} (2.95 sq mi)

Population (2015)
  - Total: 309
  - Density: 31/km^{2} (80/sq mi)
- Time zone: UTC+1 (CET)
  - Summer (DST): UTC+2 (CEST)
- Postal code: 5838
- Area code: 68

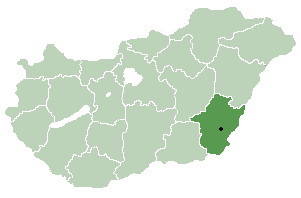
Location of Békés County in Hungary

Magyardombegyház is a village in Békés County, in the Southern Great Plain region of south-east Hungary.

In the 19th century, a small Jewish community lived in the village, many of whose members were murdered in the Holocaust,

== Geography ==
It covers an area of 7.64 km^{2} and has a population of 237 people (2015).
