= Kardos =

- Interactive map of Kardos
- Coordinates: 46°47′38.39″N 20°42′57.6″E
- Country: Hungary
- County: Békés

Area
  - Total: 42.79 km^{2} (16.52 sq mi)

Population (2015)
  - Total: 632
  - Density: 14.8/km^{2} (38/sq mi)
- Time zone: UTC+1 (CET)
  - Summer (DST): UTC+2 (CEST)
- Postal code: 5552
- Area code: 66

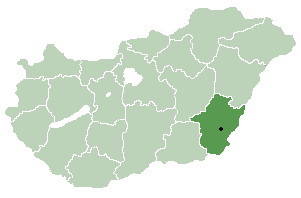
Location of Békés County in Hungary

Kardos is a village in Békés County, in the Southern Great Plain region of south-east Hungary.

== Geography ==
It covers an area of 42.79 km^{2} and has a population of 632 people (2015).
