= Csárdaszállás =

Coordinates: 46°52′N 20°56′E

- Interactive map of Csárdaszállás
- Country: Hungary
- County: Békés

Area
  - Total: 54.17 km^{2} (20.92 sq mi)

Population (2015)
  - Total: 372
  - Density: 6.9/km^{2} (18/sq mi)
- Time zone: UTC+1 (CET)
  - Summer (DST): UTC+2 (CEST)
- Postal code: 5621
- Area code: 66

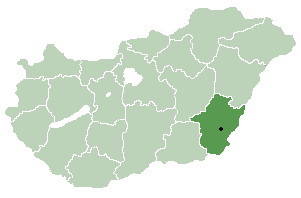
Location of Békés County in Hungary

Csárdaszállás is a village in Békés County, in the Southern Great Plain region of south-east Hungary.

== Geography ==
It covers an area of 54.17 km^{2} and has a population of 372 people (2015).
