= Dombiratos =

Coordinates: 46°25′N 21°07′E

- Coat of arms
- Interactive map of Dombiratos
- Country: Hungary
- County: Békés

Area
  - Total: 18.31 km^{2} (7.07 sq mi)

Population (2013)
  - Total: 560
  - Density: 30.6/km^{2} (79/sq mi)
- Time zone: UTC+1 (CET)
  - Summer (DST): UTC+2 (CEST)
- Postal code: 5745
- Area code: 68

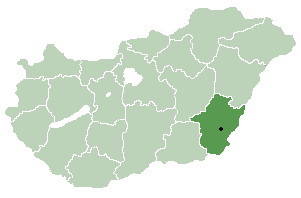
Location of Békés County in Hungary

Dombiratos is a village in Békés County, in the Southern Great Plain region of south-east Hungary.

In the 19th century, a small Jewish community lived in the village, many of whose members were murdered in the Holocaust

== Geography ==
It covers an area of 18.31 km^{2} (7 sq mi) and has a population of 560 people (2013 estimate).

== Population ==
Year	1980	1990	2001	2010	2011	2013	2021
Population	1,106 (census)	903 (census)	753 (census)	556 (estimate)	551 (census)	560 (estimate)	475
