= Okány =

Coordinates: 46°54′N 21°21′E

- Interactive map of Okány
- Country: Hungary
- County: Békés

Area
  - Total: 70.65 km^{2} (27.28 sq mi)

Population (2015)
  - Total: 2,563
  - Density: 36.3/km^{2} (94/sq mi)
- Time zone: UTC+1 (CET)
  - Summer (DST): UTC+2 (CEST)
- Postal code: 5534
- Area code: 66

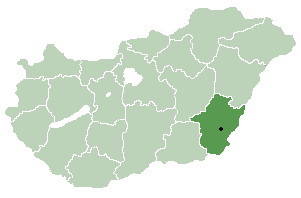
Location of Békés County in Hungary

Okány is a village in Békés County, in the Southern Great Plain region of south-east Hungary. In 2015, the village had 2,563 people.
