= Kertészsziget =

Coordinates: 47°09′N 21°04′E

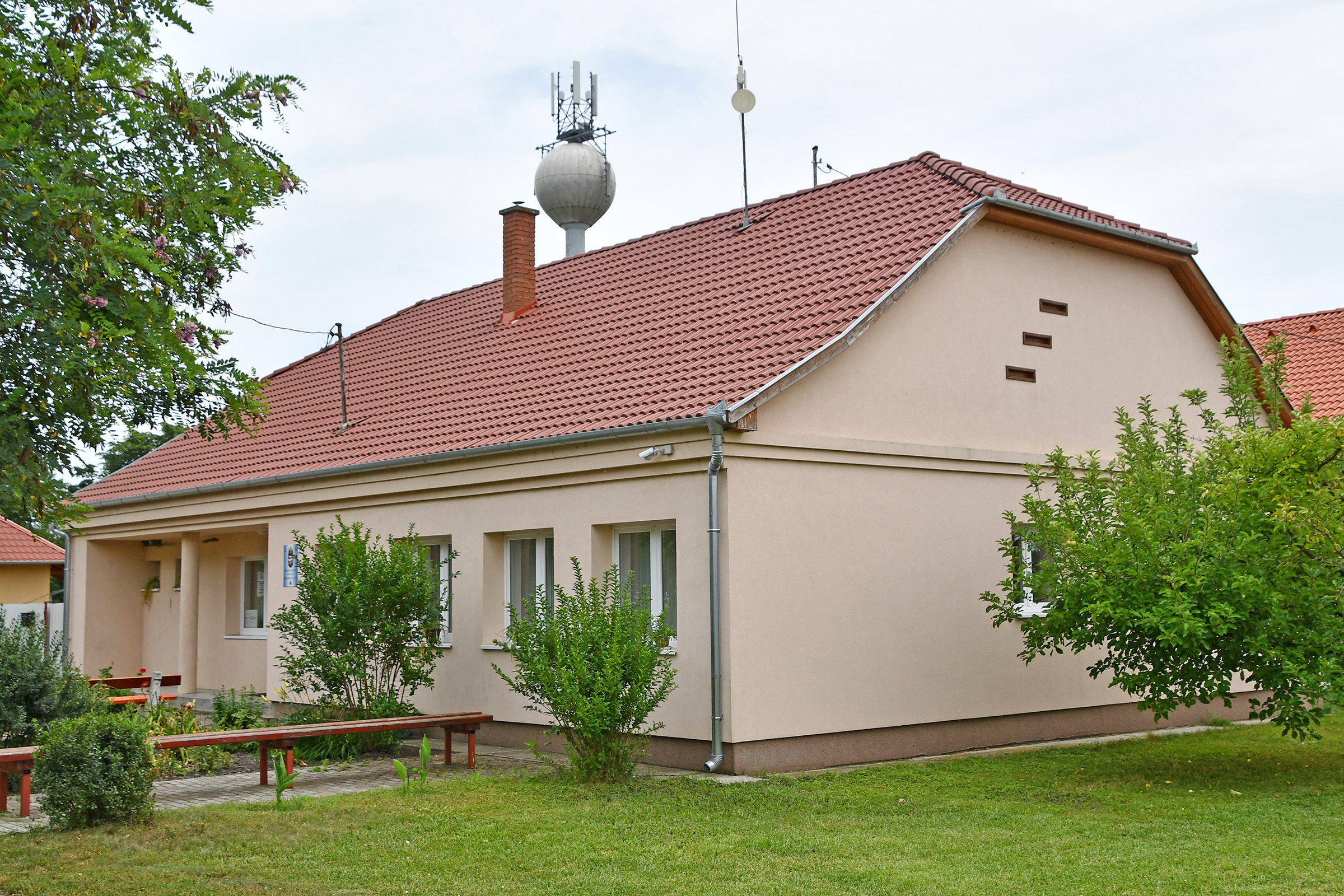
- Village hall
- Interactive map of Kertészsziget
- Country: Hungary
- County: Békés

Area
  - Total: 39.15 km^{2} (15.12 sq mi)

Population (2015)
  - Total: 374
  - Density: 9.6/km^{2} (25/sq mi)
- Time zone: UTC+1 (CET)
  - Summer (DST): UTC+2 (CEST)
- Postal code: 5526
- Area code: 66

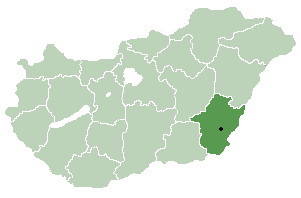
Location of Békés County in Hungary

Kérteszsziget is a village in Békés County, in the Southern Great Plain region of south-east Hungary.

== Geography ==
It covers an area of 39.15 km^{2} and has a population of 374 people (2015).
