= Magyarbánhegyes =

Coordinates: 46°27′N 20°58′E

Magyar-bánhegyes
- Interactive map of Magyar-bánhegyes
- Country: Hungary
- County: Békés

Area
  - Total: 36.56 km^{2} (14.12 sq mi)

Population (2002)
  - Total: 2,691
  - Density: 74/km^{2} (190/sq mi)
- Time zone: UTC+0 (CET)
  - Summer (DST): UTC+1 (CEST)
- Postal code: 5667
- Area code: 68

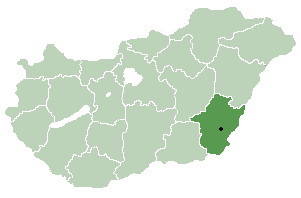
Location of Békés County in Hungary

Magyarbánhegyes is a village in Békés County, in the Southern Great Plain region of south-east Hungary.

In the 19th century, a small Jewish community lived in the village, many of whose members were murdered in the Holocaust, also the village also has an old Jewish cemetery,

== Geography ==
It covers an area of 36.56 km² and has a population of 2691 people (2001).

This source shows this place as Magyar-Banhegyes, Austria-Hungary as place of invention pg 798 in 1888
