= Vásárhelyi =

Vásárhelyi (Hungarian: [ˈvaːʃaːrhɛji] = marketplace or fairgrounds) is a Hungarian surname. Notable people with the surname include:

- María Alejandra Vasarhelyi, Argentine psychology professor
- Elizabeth Chai Vasarhelyi, American documentary filmmaker
- Miklós Vásárhelyi, Hungarian journalist and politician
- Pál Vásárhelyi, Hungarian competitive ice dancer
- Victor Vasarely (Győző Vásárhelyi), Hungarian-French painter and sculptor
