= Kaszaper =

Coordinates: 46°28′N 20°50′E

- Coat of arms
- Interactive map of Kaszaper
- Country: Hungary
- County: Békés

Area
  - Total: 33.28 km^{2} (12.85 sq mi)

Population (2015)
  - Total: 1,933
  - Density: 57.6/km^{2} (149/sq mi)
- Time zone: UTC+1 (CET)
  - Summer (DST): UTC+2 (CEST)
- Postal code: 5948
- Area code: 68

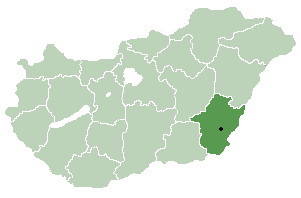
Location of Békés County in Hungary

Kaszaper is a village in Békés County, in the Southern Great Plain region of south-east Hungary.

In the 19th century, a small Jewish community lived in the village, many of whose members were murdered in the Holocaust

== Geography ==
It covers an area of 33.28 km^{2} and has a population of 1933 people (2015).
