= Szabadkígyós =

Coordinates: 46°37′N 21°06′E

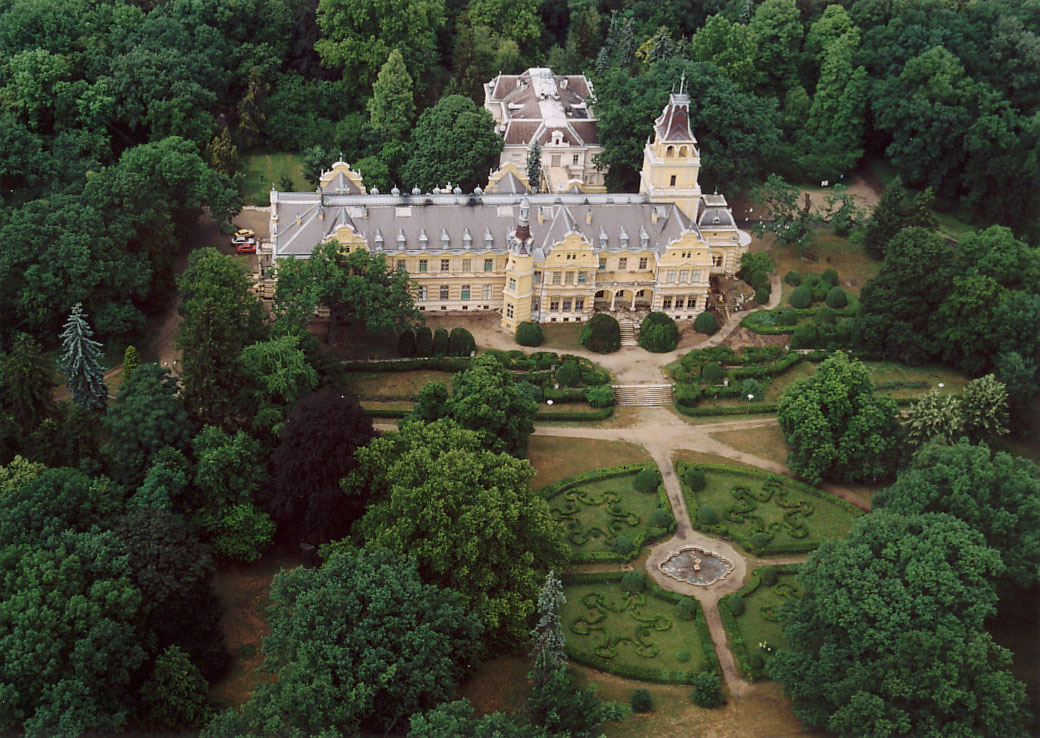
- Szabadkígyós - Wenckheim Palace.

- Coat of arms
- Interactive map of Szabadkígyós
- Country: Hungary
- County: Békés

Area
  - Total: 45.56 km^{2} (17.59 sq mi)

Population (2015)
  - Total: 2,434
  - Density: 53.4/km^{2} (138/sq mi)
- Time zone: UTC+1 (CET)
  - Summer (DST): UTC+2 (CEST)
- Postal code: 5712
- Area code: 66

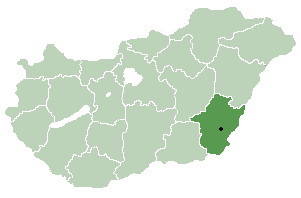
Location of Békés County in Hungary

Szabadkígyós is a village in Békés County, in the Southern Great Plain region of south-east Hungary. The main historic building is Wenckheim palace, ancestral home of Béla von Wenckheim, who served as Prime Minister of Hungary.

== Geography ==
It covers an area of 45.56 km^{2} and has a population of 2434 people (2015).

== Gallery ==
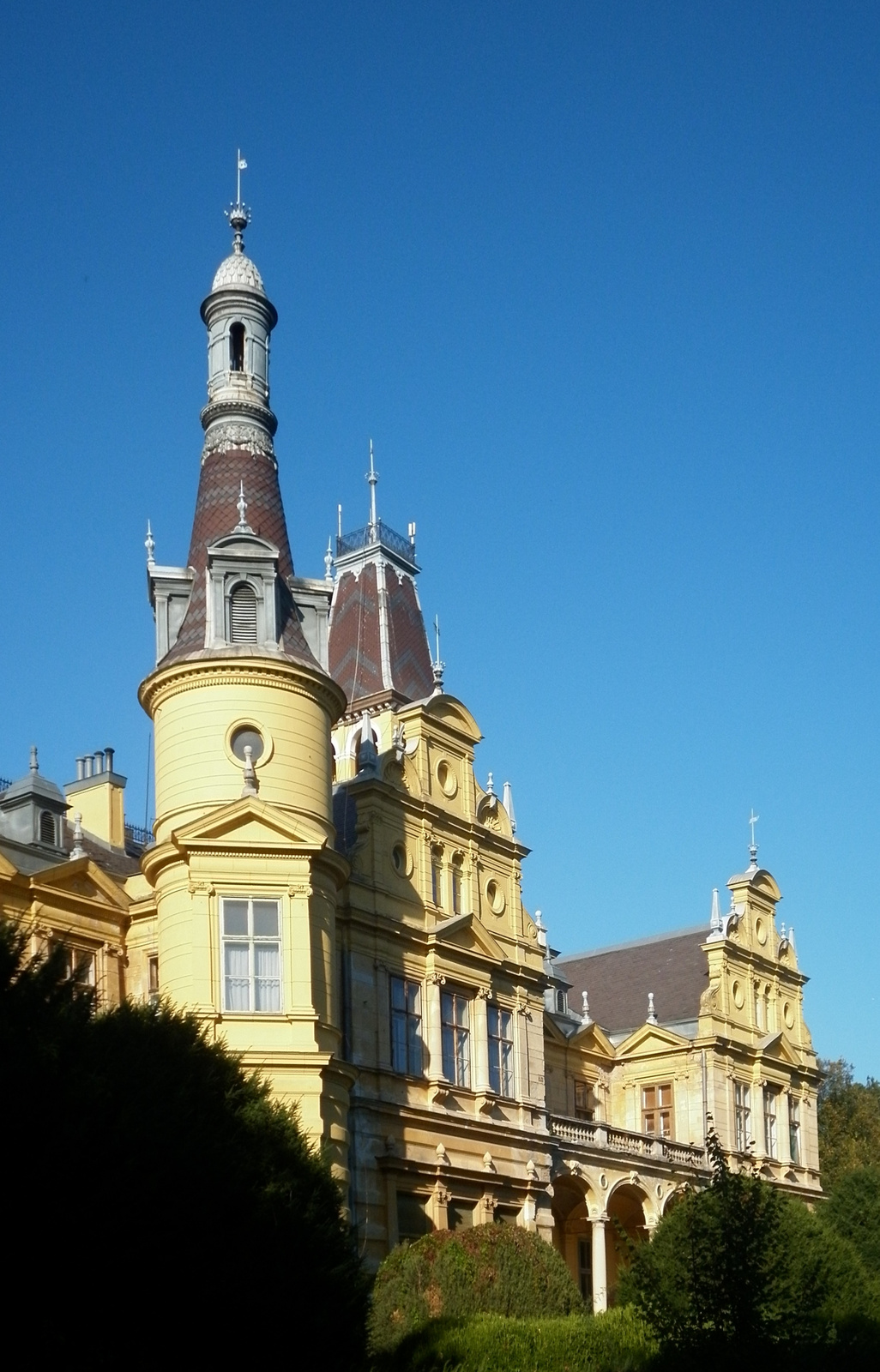
Wenckheim-palace

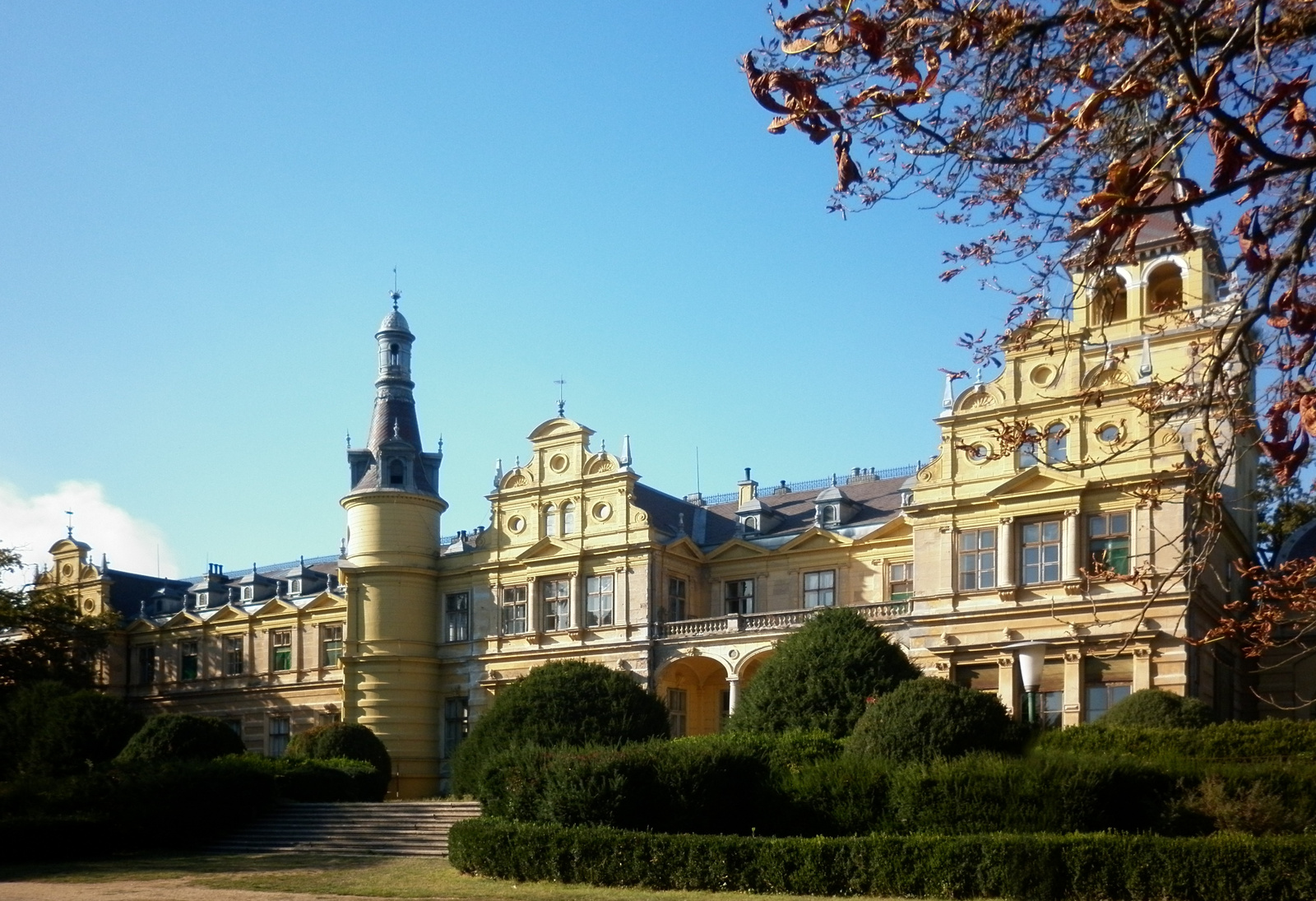

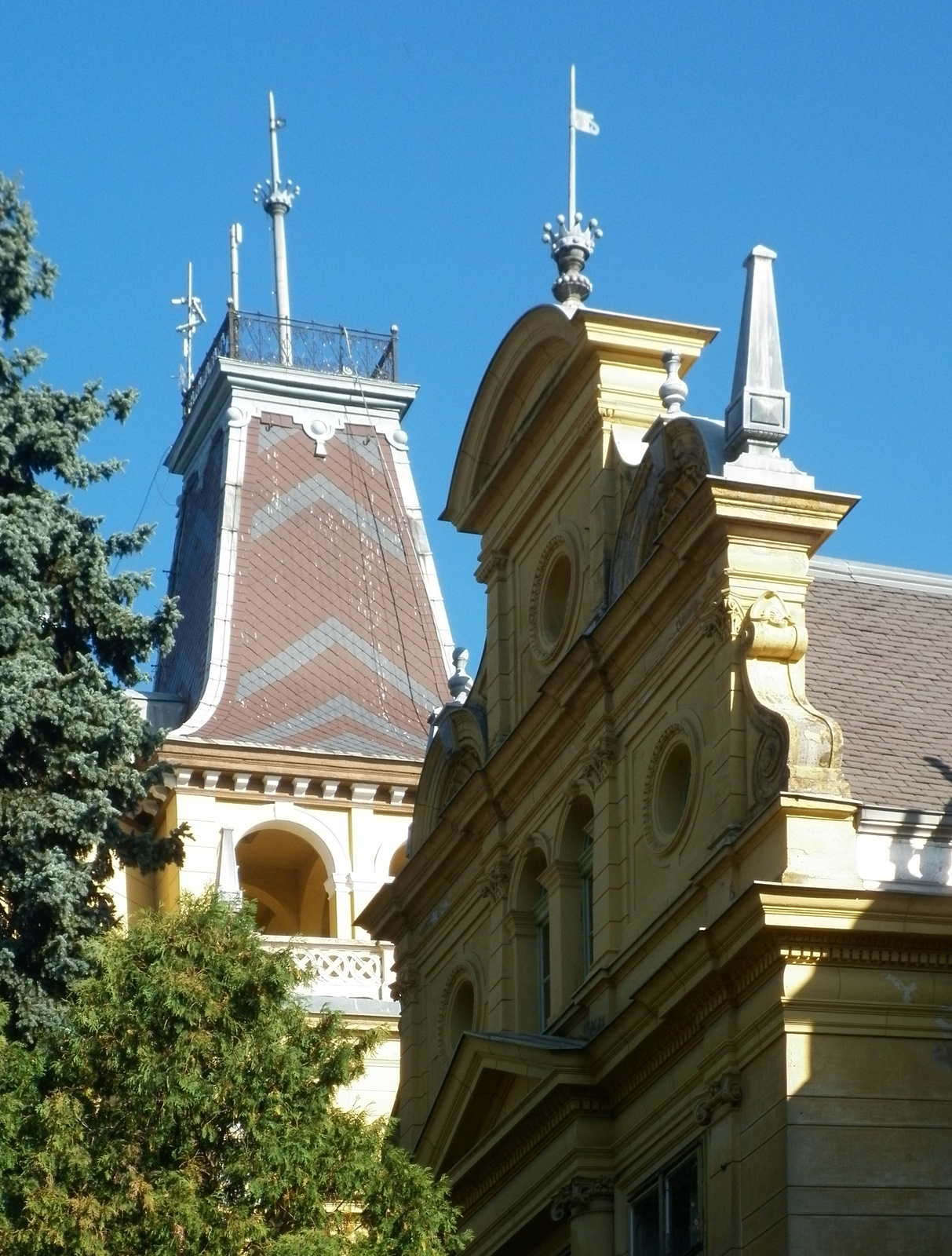

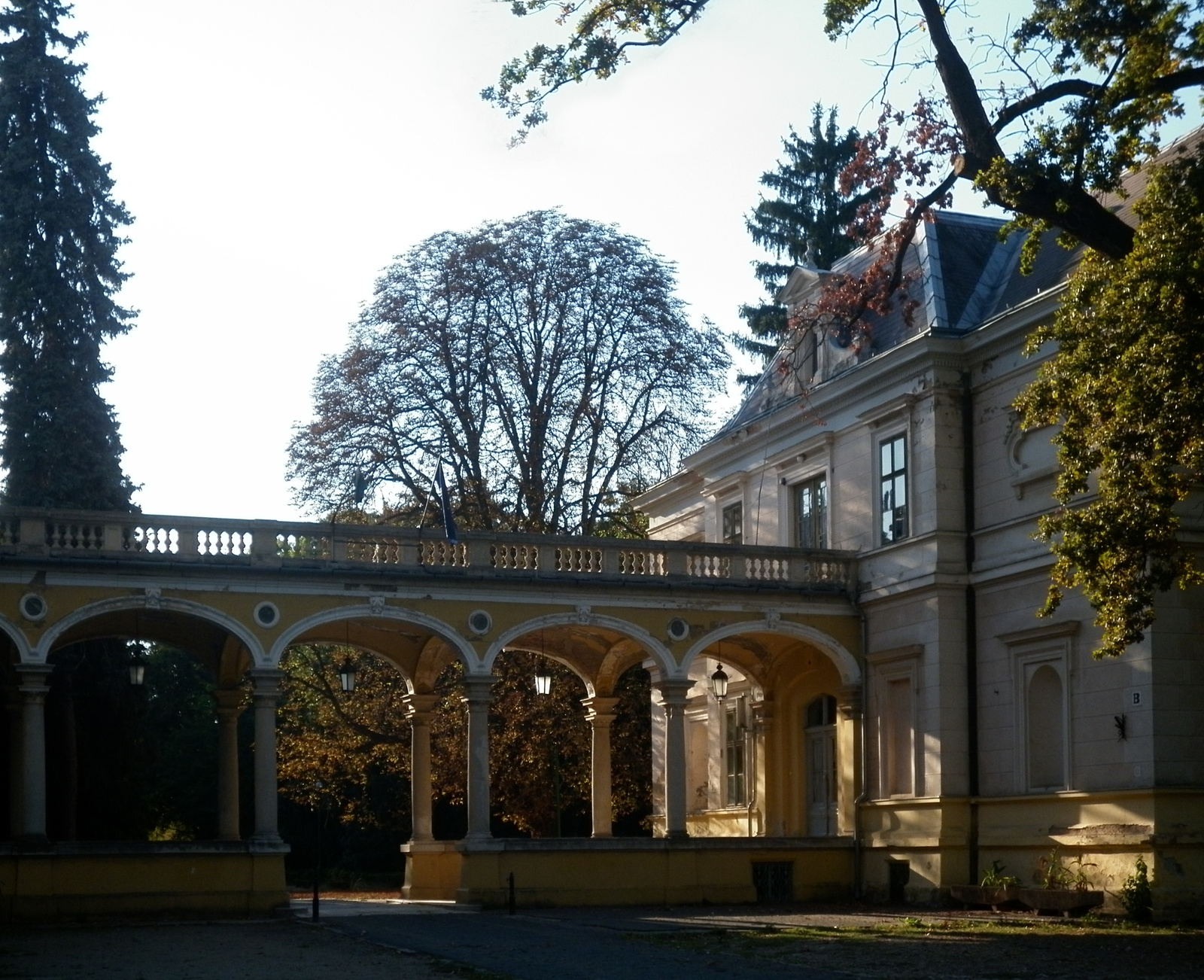
