= Tarhos =

Coordinates: 46°49′N 21°13′E

- Interactive map of Tarhos
- Country: Hungary
- County: Békés

Area
  - Total: 57.45 km^{2} (22.18 sq mi)

Population (2015)
  - Total: 773
  - Density: 13.5/km^{2} (35/sq mi)
- Time zone: UTC+1 (CET)
  - Summer (DST): UTC+2 (CEST)
- Postal code: 5641
- Area code: 68

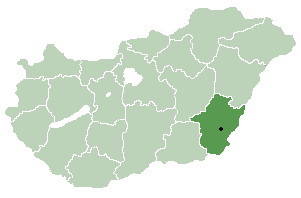
Location of Békés County in Hungary

Tarhos is a village in Békés County, in the Southern Great Plain region of south-east Hungary.

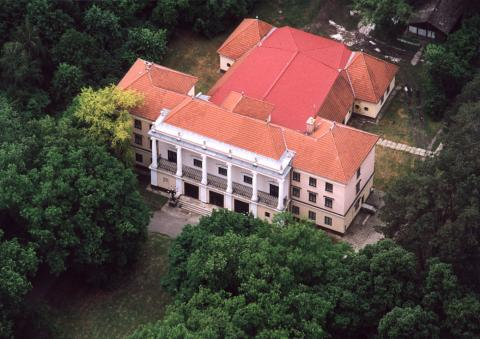
Aerial photography of a palace in Tarhos

The settlement belonged to the municipality to Békés until 1954 when it became a village in the district with an independent council, from 1974 it became a completely independent village.

== Geography ==
It covers an area of 57.45 km^{2} and has a population of 773 people (2015).
