= Zsadány =

Coordinates: 46°55′N 21°30′E

- Interactive map of Zsadány
- Country: Hungary
- County: Békés

Area
  - Total: 65.86 km^{2} (25.43 sq mi)

Population (2001)
  - Total: 1,807
  - Density: 27.44/km^{2} (71.1/sq mi)
- Time zone: UTC+1 (CET)
  - Summer (DST): UTC+2 (CEST)
- Postal code: 5537
- Area code: 66

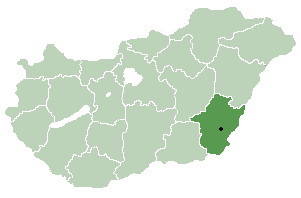
Location of Békés county in Hungary

Zsadány is a village in Békés county, in the Southern Great Plain region of south-east Hungary.

== Geography ==
It covers an area of 27.44 km² and has a population of 1807 people (2001).
