= Csabaszabadi =

Coordinates: 46.57°N 20.95°E

- Interactive map of Csabaszabadi
- Country: Hungary
- County: Békés

Area
  - Total: 32.71 km^{2} (12.63 sq mi)

Population (2025)
  - Total: 268
- Time zone: UTC+1 (CET)
  - Summer (DST): UTC+2 (CEST)
- Postal code: 5609
- Area code: 66

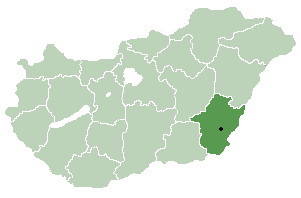
Location of Békés County in Hungary

Csabaszabadi is a village in Békés County, Southern Great Plain, Hungary.

== Geography ==
It covers an area of 32.71 km² and has a population of 380 people (2002).

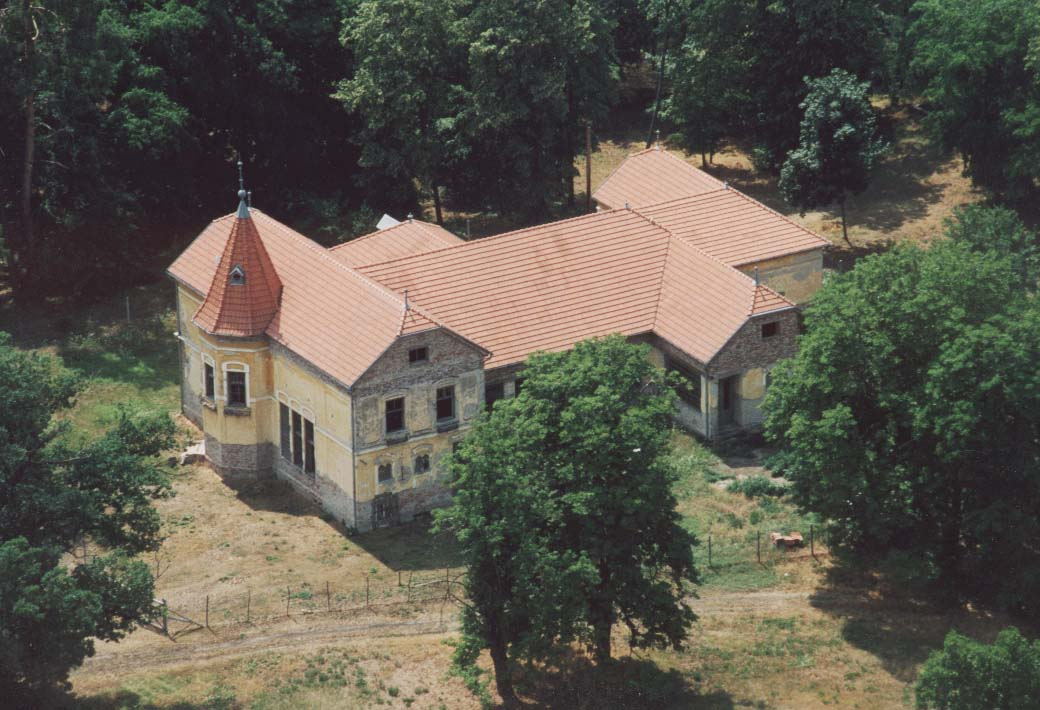
Csabaszabadi Palace
