= History of the Jews in Békés (Hungary) =

The history of the Jews in Békés County, Hungary, spans more than two centuries. Jewish settlement in the region began in the 18th century, with the population growing rapidly by the mid-19th century. Following World War I, rising antisemitism eventually let to the forced relocation of the Jewish population into ghettos and their deportation to concentration and death camps. While a few survivors returned after the war and founded a new synagogue in the county's capital, the community remains small.

== History ==
Jews presence in Békés County dates back to the first half of the 1700s. In 1768, records show only 3 Jews living in the village of Vari (Gyulavari). By the end of the 18th century, the first Jewish communities were founded in Vari, Dévaványa, and Békésszentandrás.

The population grew from 542 in 1836 to 6,255 by 1870. Between the 1850s and the First World War, extensive communal infrastructure was developed, including synagogues, prayer-houses, mikvehs, schools, and Chevra Kadishas (burial services) in town such as Békéscsaba, Gyula, Orosháza, Szeghalom, Békés, Szarvas, Battonya and Sarkad.

After the war, political instability contributed to a rise in antisemitism. New laws were implemented to dispossess Jewish citizens of their homes and property, accompanied by an increase in robberies, property destruction and violence.

=== The Holocaust ===
Beginning in 1941, forced labour was imposed on the Jewish community. Eventually, the Jews of Békés County went moved to ghettos or sent to concentration camps of Békéscsaba and Szolnok. Others were deported via transports to Auschwitz-Birkenau and Strasshof.

Of the estimated 6,200 Jews who were deported from Békés County, approximately 5,000 were murdered in the Holocaust. While about 2,000 survivors remained, very few returned to the area. Today, the Békés County Jewish community is concentrated in the capital, Békéscsaba, where a new synagogue has been built.

== Holocaust memorial days ==
Memorial services are held every summer in Békéscsaba, Orosháza, Gyula, Szarvas, Tótkomlós and Doboz to honor the victims.

== Memorials ==
- Synagogues (Békéscsaba, Gyula, Békés, Orosháza, Füzesgyarmat)
- Prayerhouses (Medgyesegyháza)
- School-buildings (Békéscsaba, Orosháza, Dévaványa)
- Jewish cemeteries (Körösnagyharsány, Dévaványa)
