= Sarkad =

Sarkad may refer to:

- Sarkad, Hungary, a town in Hungary, seat of Sarkad District
- Sarkad District, Hungary
- Sarkadkeresztúr, a village in Hungary
- Sarkadtanya, a village in Hungary
- Sarkash, a Sassanid musician

== People with the surname ==
- Imre Sarkadi
