= Sarkad District =

Sarkad District Sarkadi járás
- Districts of Hungary
- Coat of arms

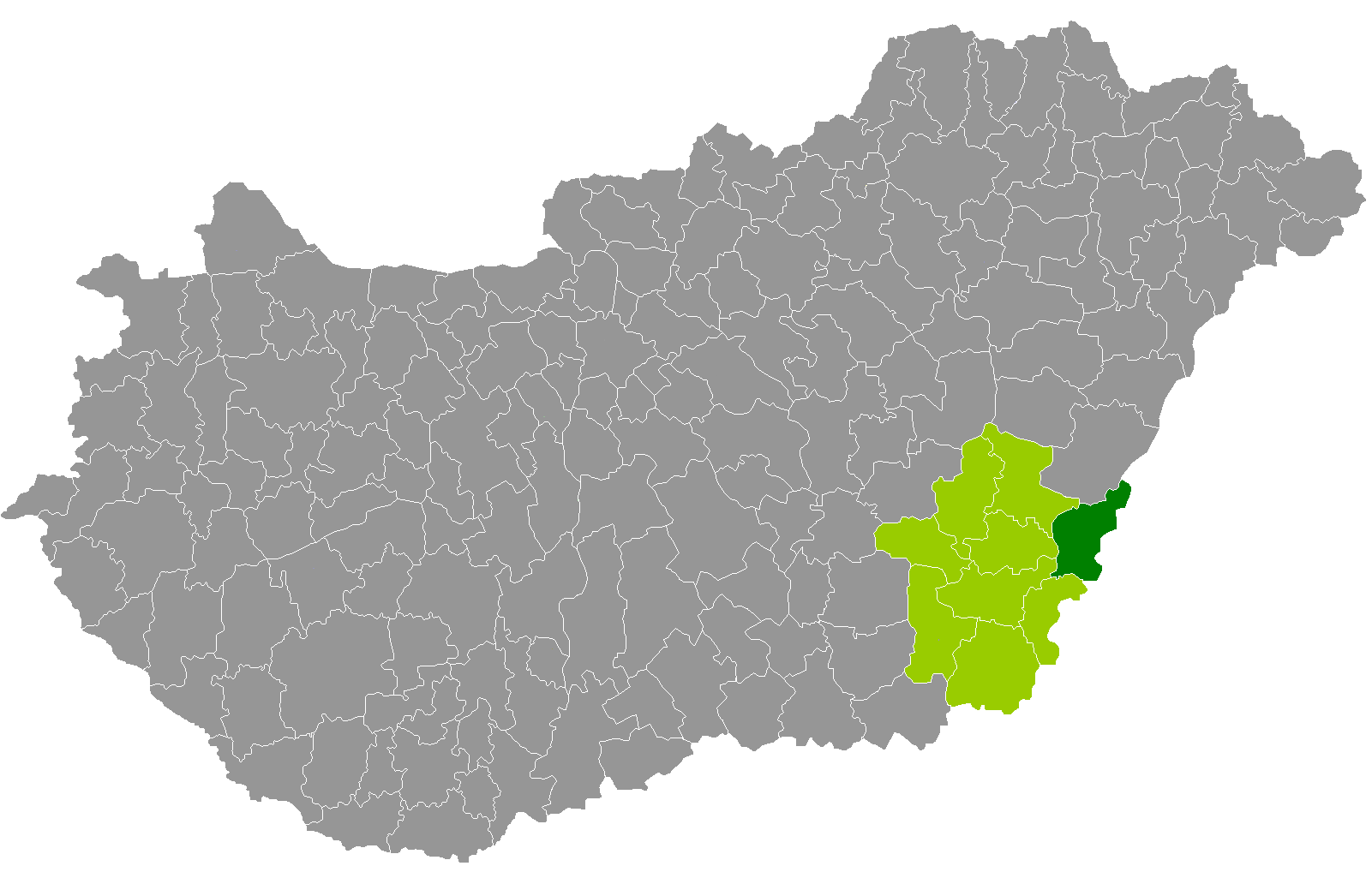
- Sarkad District within Hungary and Békés County.
- Coordinates: 46.74°N 21.38°E
- Country: Hungary
- County: Békés
- District seat: Sarkad

Area
  - Total: 570.97 km^{2} (220.45 sq mi)
  - Rank: 6th in Békés

Population (2011 census)
  - Total: 22,908
  - Rank: 9th in Békés
  - Density: 40/km^{2} (100/sq mi)

Sarkad (Hungarian: Sarkadi járás; Romanian: Districtul Șercad) is a district in north-eastern part of Békés County. Sarkad is also the name of the town where the district seat is found. The district is located in the Southern Great Plain Statistical Region.

== Geography ==
Sarkad District borders with Berettyóújfalu District (Hajdú-Bihar County) to the north, the Romanian county of Bihor to the east, Gyula District to the south, Békéscsaba District, Békés District and Szeghalom District to the west. The number of the inhabited places in Sarkad District is 11.

== Municipalities ==
The district has 1 town and 10 villages. (ordered by population, as of 1 January 2012)

- Biharugra (839)
- Geszt (754)
- Körösnagyharsány (550)
- Kötegyán (1,355)
- Méhkerék (2,033)
- Mezőgyán (1,042)
- Okány (2,547)
- **Sarkad** (10,011) – district seat
- Sarkadkeresztúr (1,495)
- Újszalonta (98)
- Zsadány (1,639)

The bolded municipality is the city.

== Demographics ==
Religion in Sarkad District (2011 census)
1. Calvinism (32.4%)
2. Lutheranism (0.30%)
3. Catholic Church (5.90%)
4. Greek Catholicism (0.30%)
5. Orthodoxy (5.30%)
6. Other religions (3.70%)
7. Non-religious (30.3%)
8. Atheists (0.90%)
9. Undeclared (20.9%)

In 2011, it had a population of 22,908 and the population density was 40/km².

Year	County population	Change
2011	22,908	n/a

=== Ethnicity ===
Besides the Hungarian majority, the main minorities are the Romanian and Roma (approx. 2,000).

Total population (2011 census): 22,908
Ethnic groups (2011 census): Identified themselves: 23,700 persons:

- Hungarians: 19,758 (83.37%)
- Romanians: 1,940 (8.19%)
- Gypsies: 1,821 (7.68%)
- Others and indefinable: 181 (0.76%)

Approx. 1,000 persons in Sarkad District did declare more than one ethnic group at the 2011 census.

=== Religion ===
Religious adherence in the county according to 2011 census:

- Reformed – 7,429;
- Catholic – 1,432 (Roman Catholic – 1,360; Greek Catholic – 72);
- Orthodox – 1,200;
- Evangelical – 76;
- other religions – 846;
- Non-religious – 6,932;
- Atheism – 214;
- Undeclared – 4,779.

== Gallery ==
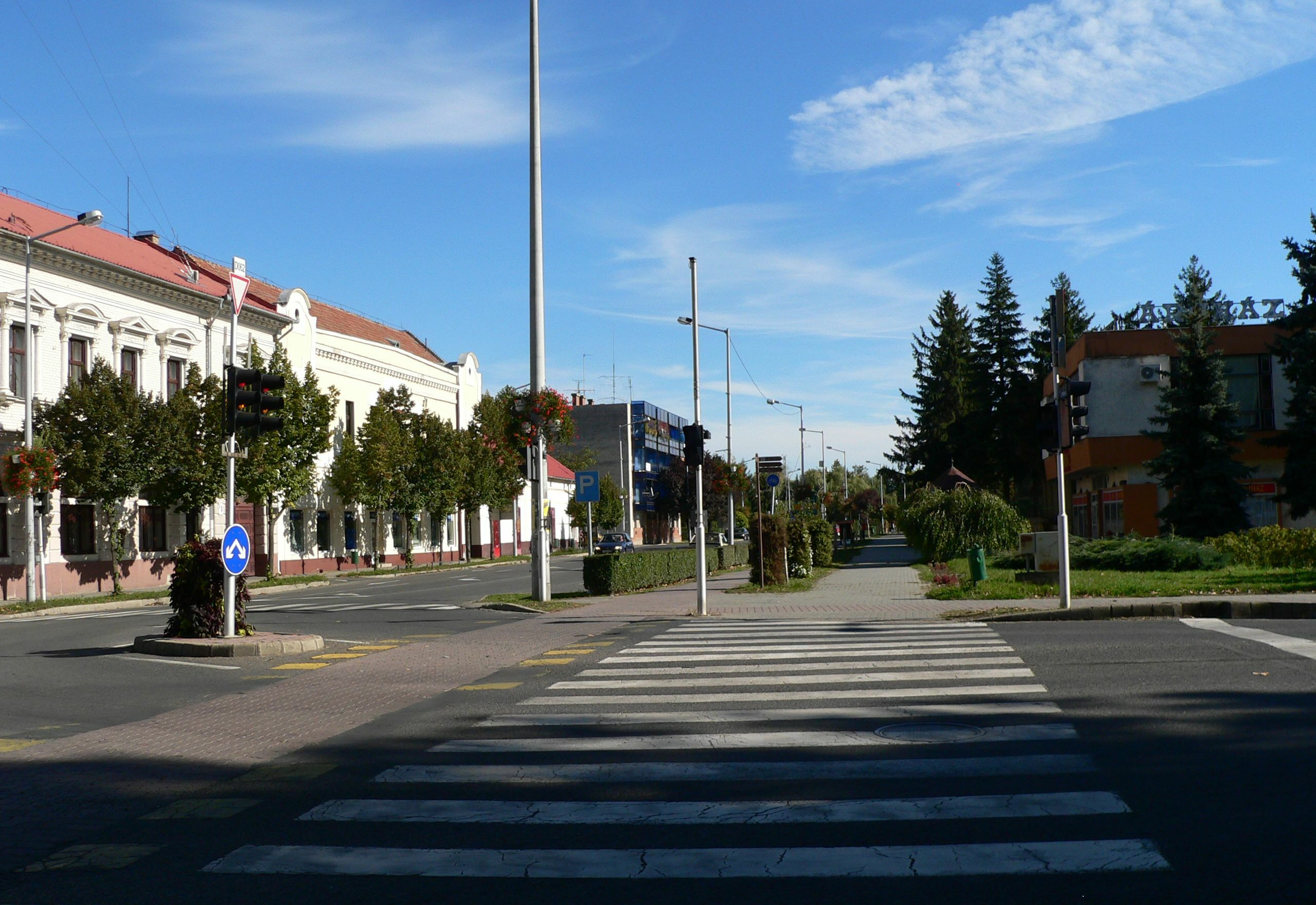
Sarkad, the district seat

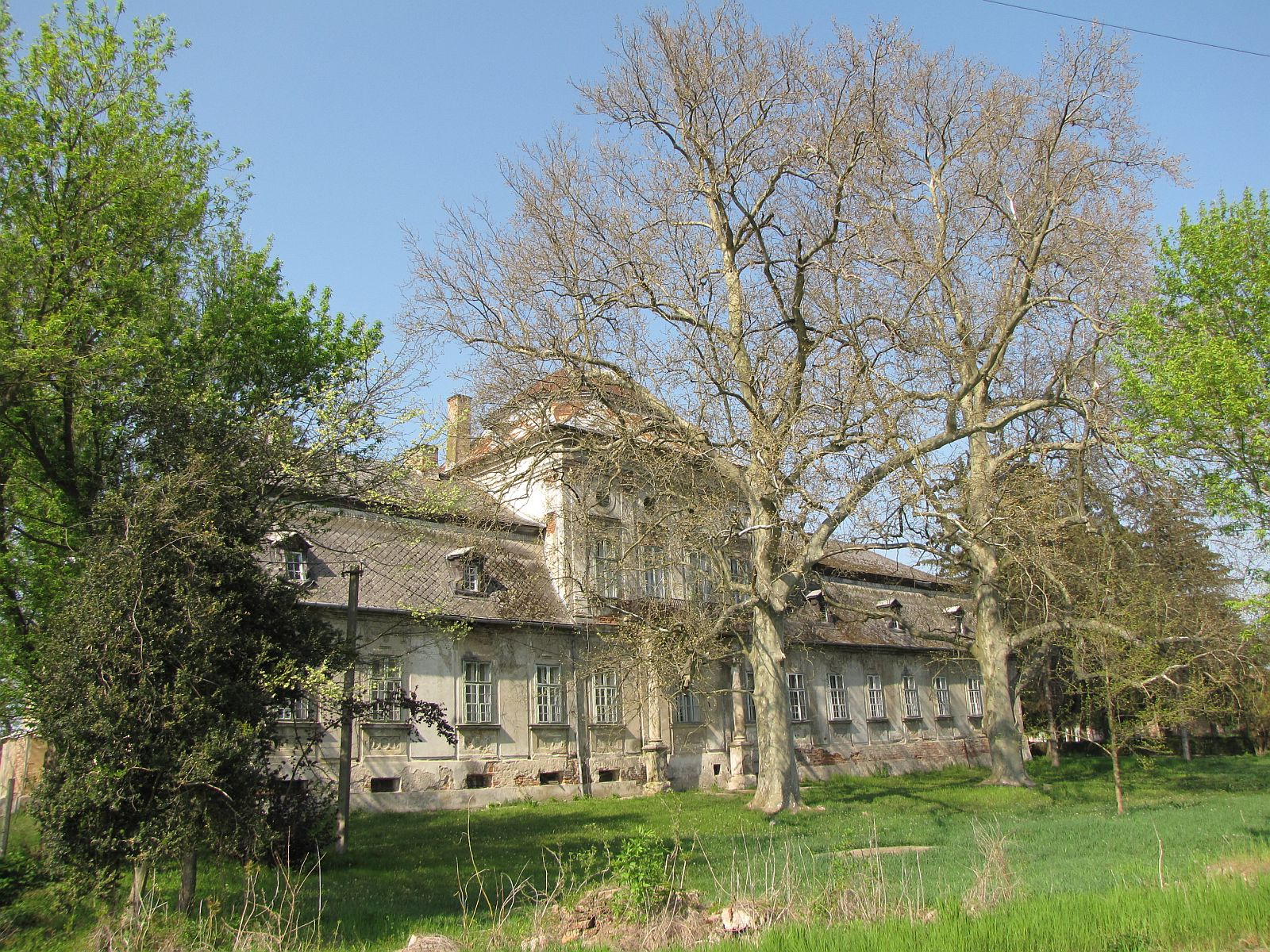
Tisza Mansion in Geszt

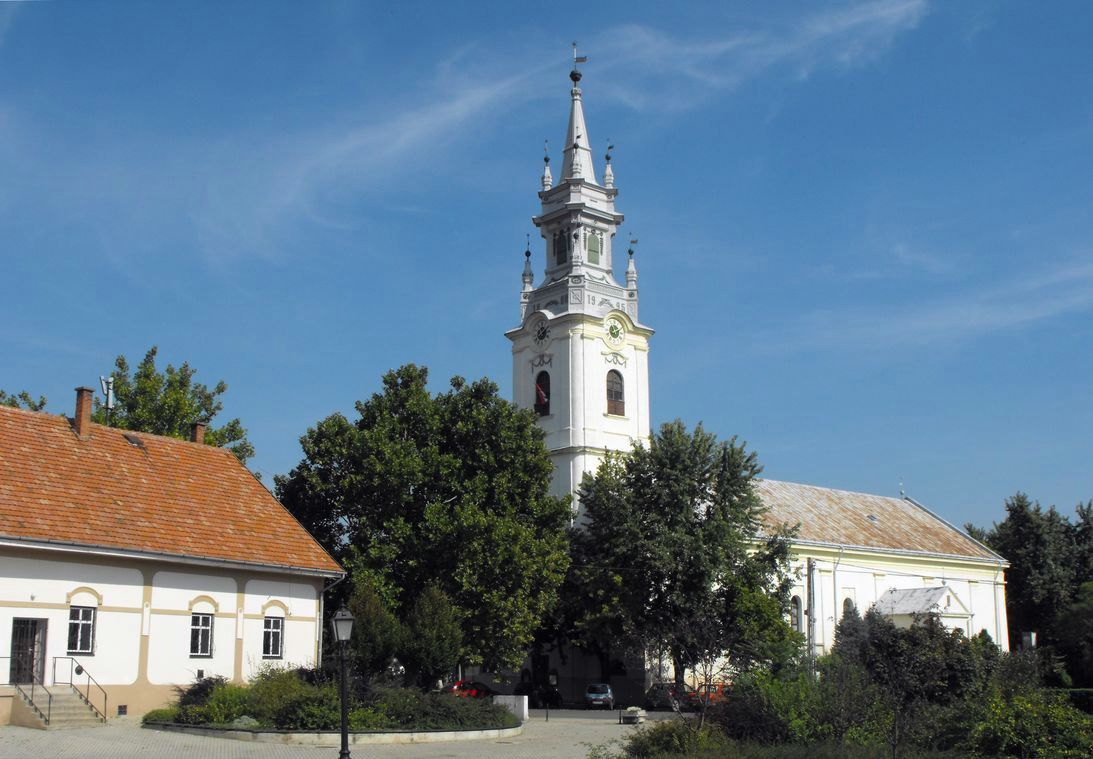
Reformed Church in Sarkad

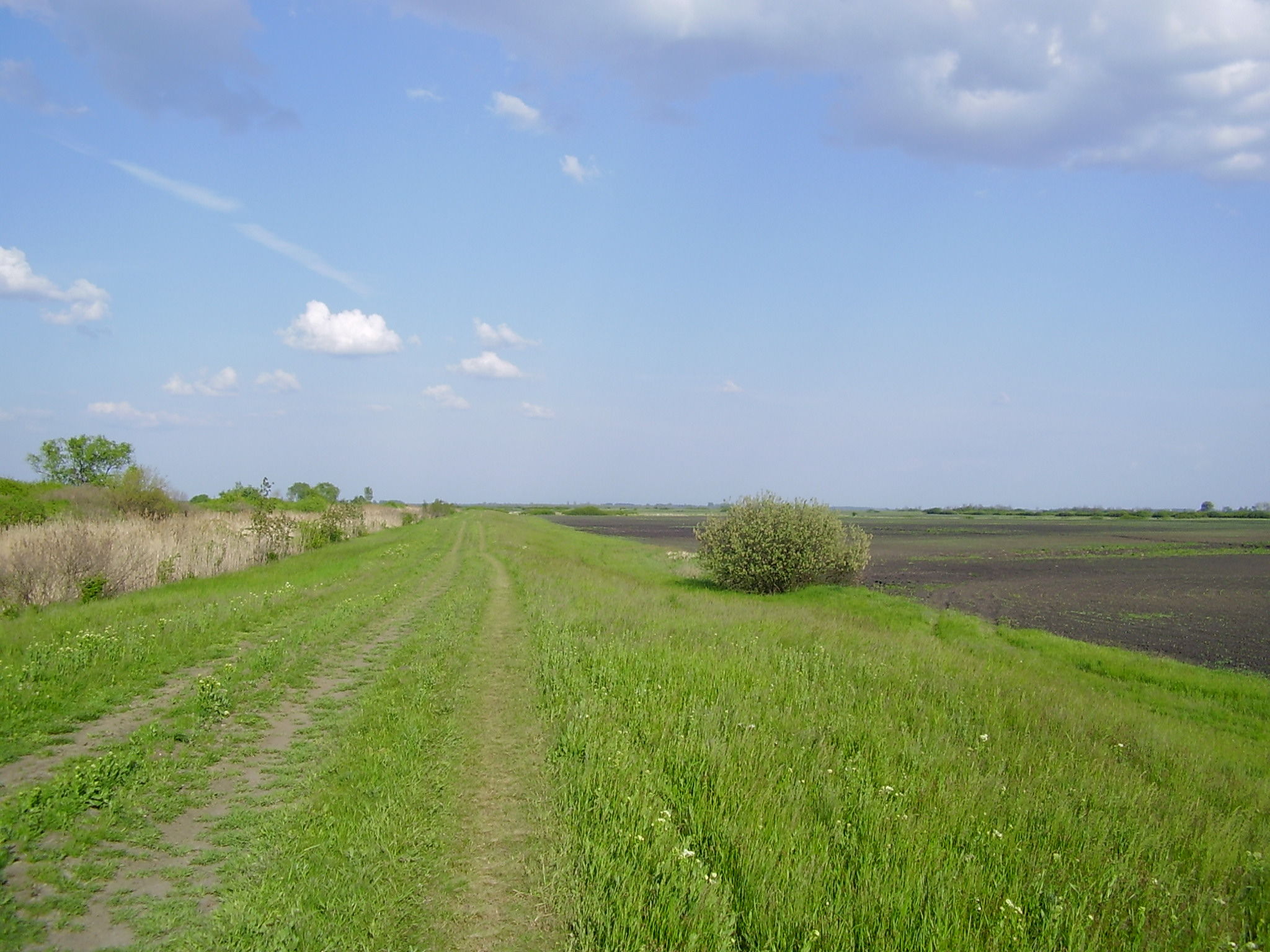
Landscape near Sarkad

== See also ==
- List of cities and towns of Hungary
