= Tibor Kruchió =

Convicted Hungarian serial killer

- Born: 1967 (age 58–59); Békés, Hungary
- Conviction: Murder x4
- Penalty: Life imprisonment without parole

Details
- Victims: 4
- Span of crimes: September – October 2001
- Country: Hungary
- State: Csongrád-Csanád
- Date apprehended: 2001

Tibor Kruchió (born 1967) is a Hungarian serial killer who robbed and killed four people from September to October 2001. Due to the ruthlessness of his crimes, he was sentenced to life imprisonment without parole.

== Early life ==
Tibor Kruchió was born into an impoverished family in Békés in 1967. After the fall of socialism in the country, he became homeless, finding refuge in abandoned houses in Szeged and homeless shelters on Indóház Square. Prior to his murder spree, he committed small-time crimes such as stealing and fraud. By that time, Kruchió had no family connections left, often interacted with other vagrants, and had no permanent residence or job.

Kruchió's crimes intensified shortly after he met Lajos Kocsis, a hardened criminal who had been released from prison following a 10-year sentence barely two weeks prior, via his acquaintance József Dimovics. At that time, Kocsis, Dimovics and a third accomplice (who was never caught) had attempted to rob a gas station in Cegléd but were prevented from doing so, and while attempting to flee, the clerks had managed to recorded the license plate of Dimovics' car, which prevented him from returning home to Szeged. The pair then went to the Baktó suburb, where they met Kruchió and asked him to help find shelter. He managed to convince a couple he knew to let the men stay in their home, but since they were short on money, the trio began devising ways to get cash quickly. Dimovics suggested that they steal from 70-year-old Imréné D., a female acquaintance of his living in Szeged, and that the one who should undertake the robbery was Kruchió, since the police were not looking for him. And so, on September 3, 2001, he was sent to the woman's apartment on Kisteleki Ede Street in the Rókus suburb, where he introduced himself to the woman's son and was allowed into the apartment after ringing the doorbell. He then knocked the woman out and strangled her with a bathrobe belt. He then stole money, jewelry, drinks and clothes from the apartment, all of which amounted to 200,000 forints. Imréné D.'s body was found four days later by her son.

Not long after the murder, Dimovics expressed his intention to surrender to police, as that way he would likely get a lesser sentence for the robbery in Cegléd. Kocsis and Kruchió considered this a potential threat, as they would likely be investigated for their respective crimes if he was arrested. Because of this, the pair devised a scheme to kill Dimovics. On September 21, they put sedatives in his drink, and after he was immobilized, they wrapped Dimovics in a rug and then pressed his chest with such force that his ribs were broken, before Kocsis finally suffocated him with a pillow. Kocsis and Kruchió then drove to an abandoned farm in Kiskundorozsma, where they threw the body in a well, throwing debris to cover it up. The pair then bought weapons in Dunaföldvár, planning to use them to commit further murders.

On October 25, Kocsis and Kruchió got a tip about 67-year-old Rozália M., a rich widow living alone in Kiskundorozsma. They went to the woman's house, where they attacked her and demanded money. The woman handed over her wallet when prompted, but when Kocsis opened it, he found only 3,000 forints in it. Enraged, Kruchió shot her, killing her almost instantly. They continued searching the house, but found nothing else of value. Outraged by the failure, the pair decided to commit another robbery on the very next day, singling out Tibor K., a friend of the widow, whom they knew travelled carrying a bag. He hid in front of his house in Tarján in the early hours of the morning, and at half past six, when he exited the building, Kruchió brandished his gun and threatened him. The man refused to hand it over, however, prompting Kruchió to shoot him three times. The severely injured victim was driven to the hospital, but succumbed to his injuries on November 9. It's unclear how much money Kruchió received from this robbery, but he handed over 20,000 to his partner-in-crime.

Overwhelmed with a desire to get more money, Kruchió attacked a metal trading site in Szeged that same day, beating up an employee with a metal rod and stealing 70,000 forints from the cash register. Although the worker was beaten unconscious, he survived the encounter.

== Arrest, trial and imprisonment ==
Both men were eventually caught by police: Kocsis was the first arrested, while the fleeing Kruchió was caught hiding in a pub in Kiskundorozsma. On September 26, 2003, the Csongrád County Court sentenced him to life imprisonment without parole for the four murders. He submitted an appeal, but it was rejected by the Szeged Judgment Board. Shortly after the verdict, doctors who examined Kruchió determined that he was suffering an advanced form of cancer. While it initially appeared that it would be fatal, he was successfully rehabilitated following an operation. Kruchió continues to serve his sentence at the Csillag Prison in Szeged.

== See also ==
- List of serial killers by country
