= Békés District =

Békés District Békési járás
- District
- Coat of arms
- Interactive map of Békés District
- Coordinates: 46.77°N 21.13°E
- Country: Hungary
- County: Békés
- District seat: Békés (town)

Area
  - Total: 525.24 km^{2} (202.80 sq mi)
  - Rank: 7th in Békés

Population (2011 census)
  - Total: 37,409
  - Rank: 5th in Békés
  - Density: 71/km^{2} (180/sq mi)

Békés (Hungarian: Békési járás) is a district in central-northern part of Békés County. Békés is also the name of the town where the district seat is found. The district is located in the Southern Great Plain Statistical Region.

== Geography ==
Békés District borders with Szeghalom District to the north, Sarkad District to the east, Békéscsaba District to the south, Szarvas District and Gyomaendrőd District to the west. The number of the inhabited places in Békés District is 7.

== Municipalities ==
The district has 2 towns and 5 villages. (ordered by population, as of 1 January 2012)

- **Békés** (19,763) – district seat
- Bélmegyer (981)
- Kamut (991)
- Köröstarcsa (2,477)
- **Mezőberény** (10,896)
- Murony (1,228)
- Tarhos (915)

The bolded municipalities are cities.

== Demographics ==
Religion in Békés District (2011 census)
1. Calvinism (25.1%)
2. Lutheranism (4.40%)
3. Catholic Church (8.90%)
4. Greek Catholicism (0.10%)
5. Other religions (3.40%)
6. Non-religious (36.9%)
7. Atheists (0.90%)
8. Undeclared (20.3%)

In 2011, it had a population of 37,409 and the population density was 71/km².

Year	County population	Change
2011	37,409	n/a

=== Ethnicity ===
Besides the Hungarian majority, the main minorities are the Roma (approx. 2,000), German and Slovak (450), Romanian (100).

Total population (2011 census): 37,409
Ethnic groups (2011 census): Identified themselves: 36,283 persons:

- Hungarians: 32,978 (90.89%)
- Gypsies: 2,102 (5.78%)
- Germans: 461 (1.27%)
- Slovaks: 448 (1.23%)
- Others and indefinable: 294 (0.81%)

Approx. 1,000 persons in Békés District did not declare their ethnic group at the 2011 census.

=== Religion ===
Religious adherence in the county according to 2011 census:

- Reformed – 9,393;
- Catholic – 3,367 (Roman Catholic – 3,321; Greek Catholic – 46);
- Evangelical – 1,638;
- other religions – 1,270;
- Non-religious – 13,812;
- Atheism – 326;
- Undeclared – 7,603.

== Gallery ==
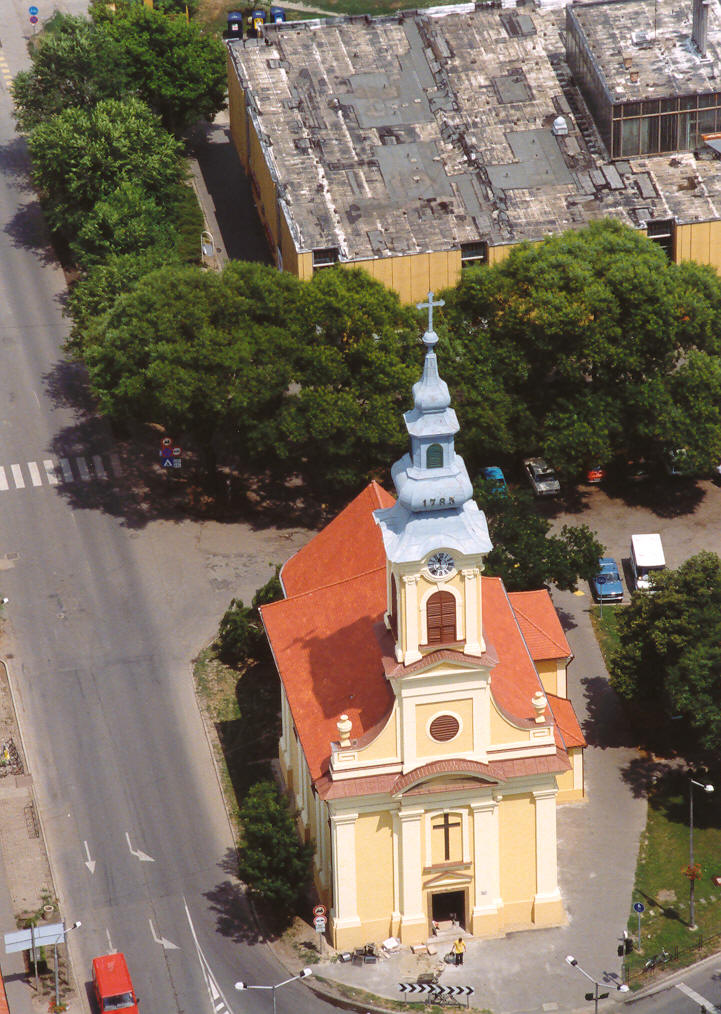
Békés, the district seat

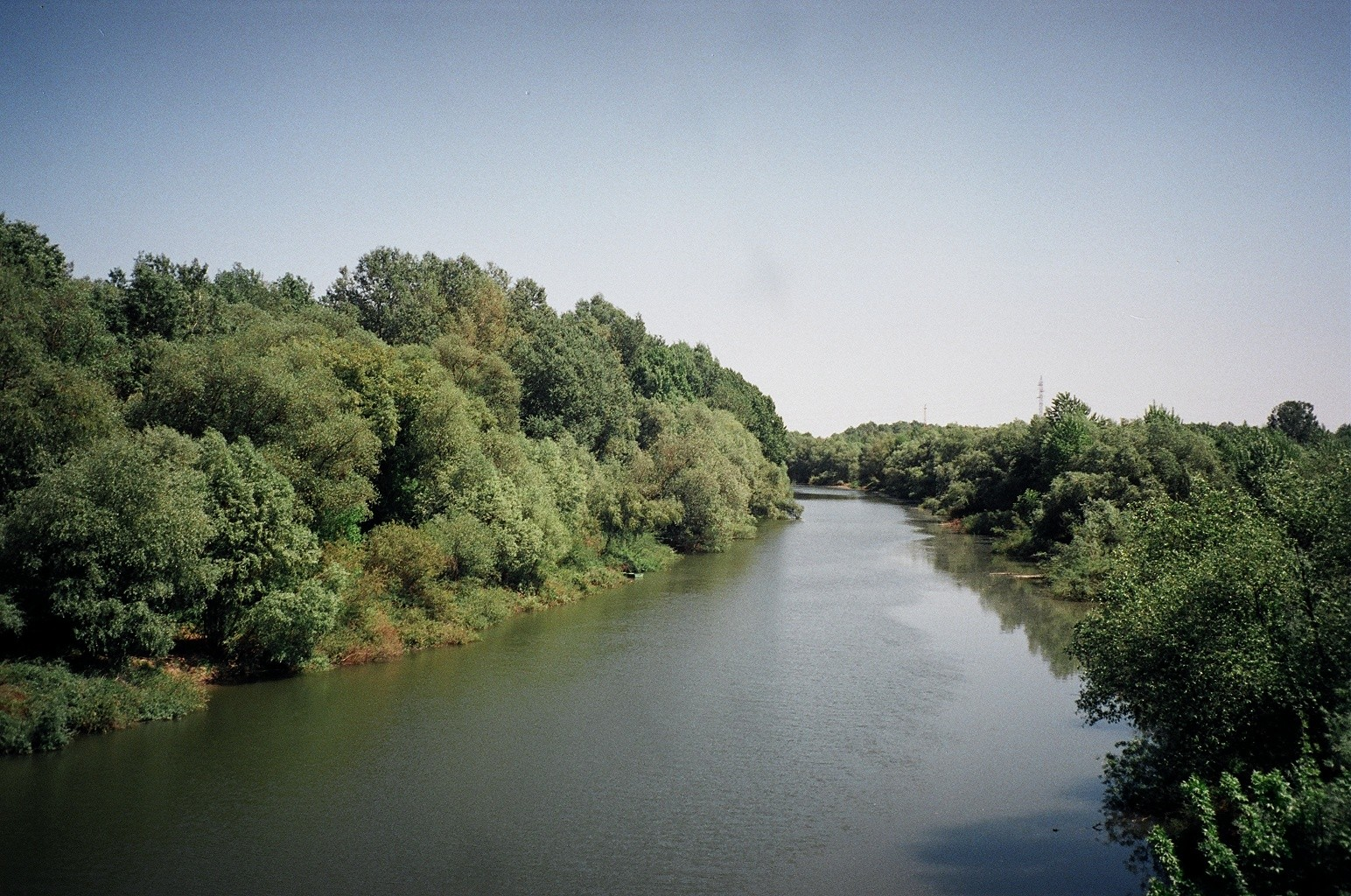
Kettős-Körös river near Mezőberény

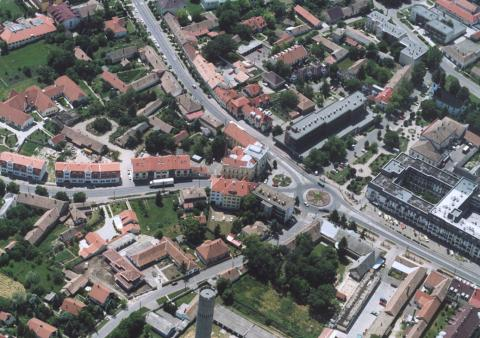
Aerial view of Mezőberény

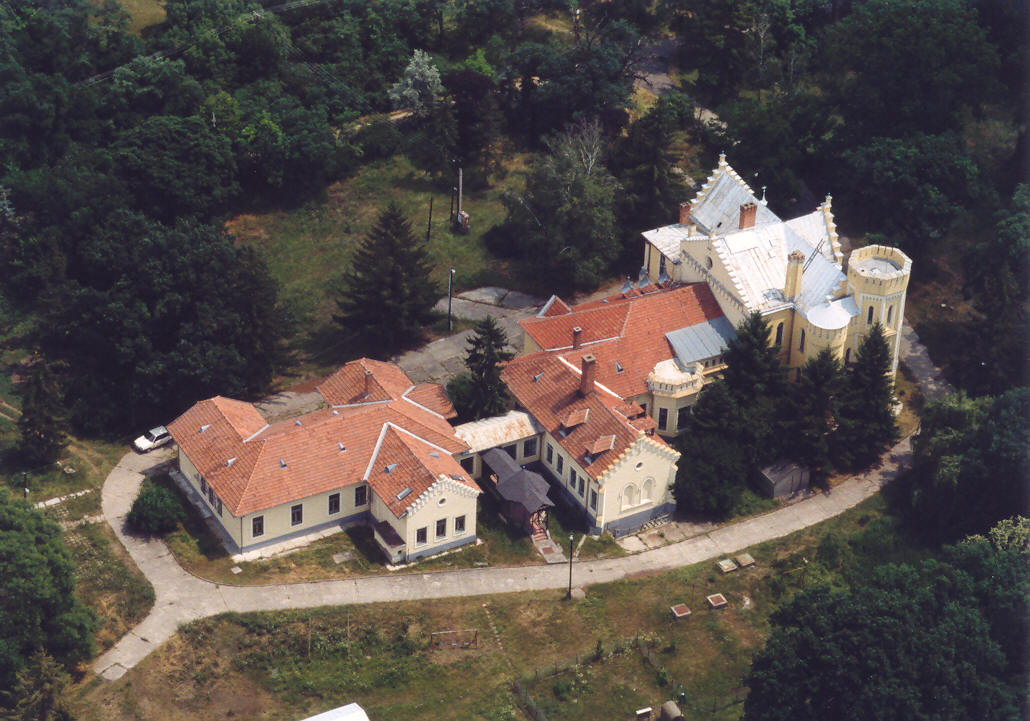
Wenckheim Mansion in Bélmegyer

== See also ==
- List of cities and towns of Hungary
