= Újkígyós =

- Town
- Flag Coat of arms

- Location within Hungary
- Coordinates: 46.583°N 21.033°E
- Country: Hungary
- County: Békés
- District: Békéscsaba

Area
  - Total: 54.92 km^{2} (21.20 sq mi)

Population (2008)
  - Total: 5,537
  - Density: 104/km^{2} (270/sq mi)
- Time zone: UTC+1 (CET)
  - Summer (DST): UTC+2 (CEST)
- Postal code: 5661
- Area code: (+36) 66
- Website: ujkigyos.hu

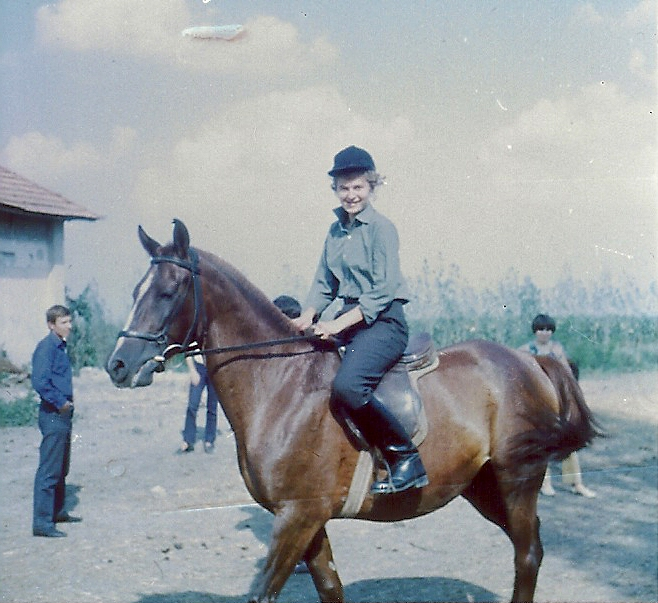
Local woman, c. 1968

Újkígyós is a town in Békés County in the Southern Great Plain region of southeast Hungary.

== Geography ==
It covers an area of 54.92 km^{2} (21.20 sq mi) and as of 2002, it had a population of 5,723.

Although the "prefix" "új", meaning "new," seems to suggest that the town is of recent creation, it probably dates as far back in history as the neighboring Szabadkigyos "Free Kigyos" (see the date on the town's Coat of Arms pictured on this page). The town experienced a great expansion after World War II The Hungarian Communist Party was consolidating its power as part of its "transformation socialiste de la agriculture" that was imposed on the rural population. Farming families from the surrounding countryside, most of whom had once worked as tenants of the recently departed gentry, were obliged to relocate to a central district and to work the land as part of collective.

As recently as the late 1960s, many former residences that had been converted to barns and storehouses were still in use by the collective.

The gradual relaxation of government controls that followed the Soviet Russian invasion and subsequent repression of 1956 and the slow economic recovery of the 1960s brought marked improvement to the lives of the townspeople. Indoor plumbing was installed, although it was so deficient people referred to it contemptuously as "sozialisch Arbeit". Masses, including wedding masses, were celebrated under official government auspices in the local Roman Catholic church.

During the summer of 1968 during the annual national Táncfesztivál, Újkígyós, along with the rest of the country, was able for the first time to welcome many of the 200,000 returning expatriates who had fled the country after the aborted revolt of 1956. This novelty coincided with the apogee of Alexander Dubček's reform efforts in neighboring Czechoslovakia, the radicalism of which invited the return of the Russian military before the summer's end on the evening of 18/19 August 1968.

Forty years later, the town seems to differ little in size or aspect. In fact, an aerial or satellite view of the region shows little difference from photographs taken in 1962 to showcase the success of the government's collectivization programs. Modern amenities abound by comparison; there was only one car in Ujkigyos in 1968. But the town has grown little because many of the young people leave to seek their fortunes in the larger cities such as Szeged and Budapest.

Since the Communist Party gave up its monopoly of power in 1989, privatization of collective farms has taken place. But more research is needed to shed light on the path taken by the people of Uíkígyós. Research needs to be done as to what extent the collective has continued to function as a cooperative enterprise. It also needs to be determined how much of the surrounding farmland has been deeded to private individuals or restored to previous owners. One source states unequivocally that "in the 1990s, the shops of the bankrupt co-operative became privatised, and the co-operative itself was split into several smaller business units. Several families are farming now as private farmers on its land given to them after a compensation movement." Uíkígyós has enjoyed many changes since the installation of democratic government. But the photograph shown on this page of the young girl on horseback, taken in the summer of 1968, could be reproduced on the outskirts of town today (2010). The tradition of "horsemanship" dates back to the early days of the Magyar migration into the Carpathian basin, and it is not likely to vanish anytime soon.

== Twin towns – sister cities ==
Újkígyós is twinned with:

- Frumoasa, Harghita, Romania (2008)

== Bibliography ==
- Mihalyfi, Erno (1962). La Hongrie par l'Image. Budapest: Imprimerie Kossuth.
- King, Margaret L (2001). Western Civilization: A Social and Cultural History. Upper Saddle River, NJ: Prentice Hall, Inc.
- Jároli, József (2007). "Summary". Szabadkígyós - Újkígyós. Száz magyar falu könyvesháza Kht. ISBN 963-9287-39-3.
