= Sándor Kónya =

Hungarian operatic tenor (1923 - 2002)

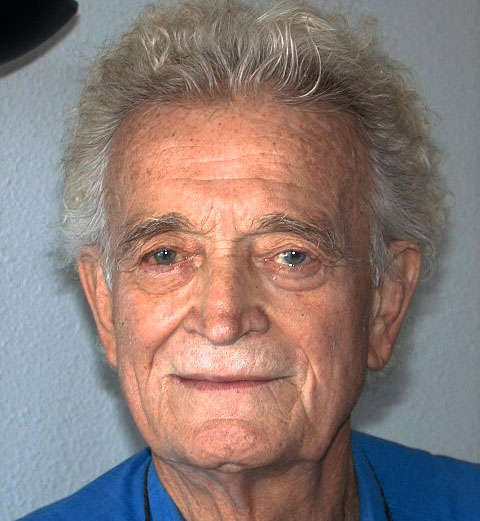
- Kónya in 2000
- Born: 23 September 1923; Sarkad, Hungary
- Died: 20 May 2002 (aged 78)
- Occupation: Operatic tenor

Sándor Kónya (23 September 1923 – 20 May 2002) was a Hungarian tenor who appeared internationally, particularly associated with German and Italian roles, especially Lohengrin and Calaf.

== Biography ==
Sándor Kónya in Lohengrin, Bayreuth Festival, 1958.

Kónya was born in Sarkad and began his vocal studies at the Franz Liszt Academy in Budapest, with Ferenc Székelyhidy. He completed his studies first in Detmold with Frederick Husler. In 1946 two German businessmen (Anton Giesert and Alfons Lehmkuhle from Ostbevern) supported him financially after he gave a performance in Bielefeld shortly after the war. It was one of these men who introduced him to the general music director of the Stadthalle in Münster, Dressel, who sent him to study with Husler. He then studied in Rome with Namcini, and in Milan with Rico Lani. He made his professional debut in Bielefeld, as Turiddu in Mascagni's Cavalleria Rusticana, in 1951. He first appeared there as Wagner's Lohengrin, in 1953. For some years, he appeared under the stage name Alexander Konya.

Following engagements at Darmstadt, Stuttgart, and Hamburg, Kónya became a member of the Berlin State Opera in 1955, where he created the role of Leandro in Henze's König Hirsch. A performance of Nureddin in Der Barbier von Bagdad by Peter Cornelius at the Edinburgh Festival in 1956 attracted international attention. He made a stunning 1958 debut at the Bayreuth Festival as Lohengrin which became one of his signature roles, also for his debut at the Paris Opéra in 1959. He first appeared at La Scala in Milan as Wagner's Parsifal, and at the San Francisco Opera as Dick Johnson in Puccini's La Fanciulla del West, followed there by Lohengrin, Rodolfo in Puccini's La bohème and Radames in Verdi's Aida. His Metropolitan Opera debut took place on 28 October 1961 as Lohengrin. In fourteen seasons at the Met, his roles included Radames, Dick Johnson opposite Renata Tebaldi's Minnie, Calaf in Puccini's Turandot, another signature role, Pinkerton in Puccini's Madama Butterfly, Stolzing in Wagner's Die Meistersinger von Nürnberg, Max in Weber's Der Freischütz, Erik in Wagner's Der fliegende Holländer, Cavaradossi in Puccini's Tosca, and Edgardo in Donizetti's Lucia di Lammermoor, which he sang in a new 1964 production alongside Joan Sutherland. Lohengrin was once again his debut role at the London's Royal Opera House in London in 1963.

Gifted with a shining spinto voice, Kónya had an easy top register placing him in the fach "jugendlicher heldentenor" while affording him the full plangency of the Italian roles as well. Kónya left only a small number of commercial recordings, including a 1963 Die Fledermaus by Johann Strauss conducted by Oskar Danon, a 1965 Lohengrin conducted by Erich Leinsdorf, both for RCA Victor, an aria recital for Deutsche Grammophon (Il Trovatore, Meistersinger, Lohengrin, L'elisir d'amore, Martha), and a recital of songs by Wagner and Verdi, with Otto Guth at the piano (MCA). He can be heard in a number of live performances, notably as Edgardo, opposite Sutherland. There is one additional recording (Gala) of Der fliegende Holländer at the Met, a live recording on 16 February 1963 under Karl Böhm, Sandor Konya as Erik with George London as Holländer and Leonie Rysanek as Senta – GL 100.728 the CD includes a Bonus Track as Riccardo in Un Ballo in Maschera – recorded on 20 April 1968 under Thomas Schippers. Konya's 3/14/64 performance at the NY Metropolitan Opera as Rodolfo in La Bohème, was recorded live and still can be heard on Metropolitan Opera Radio.

Sándor Kónya retired to Ibiza where he died on 20 May 2002, at the age of 78.

== Sources ==
- The Metropolitan Opera Encyclopedia, edited by David Hamilton, (Simon and Schuster, 1987). ISBN 0-671-61732-X
- The Metropolitan Opera Guide to recorded Opera, edited by Paul Gruber (W.W. Norton & Company Inc., 1993). ISBN 0-393-03444-5
- Dictionnaire des interprètes et de l'interpretation musicale, Alain Pâris, (Éditions Robert Laffont, 1986). ISBN 2-221-06660-X

Münsterland Zeitung nr. 192, 21 August 1958
