= Békéscsaba District =

Békéscsaba District Békéscsabai járás
- District
- Flag Coat of arms

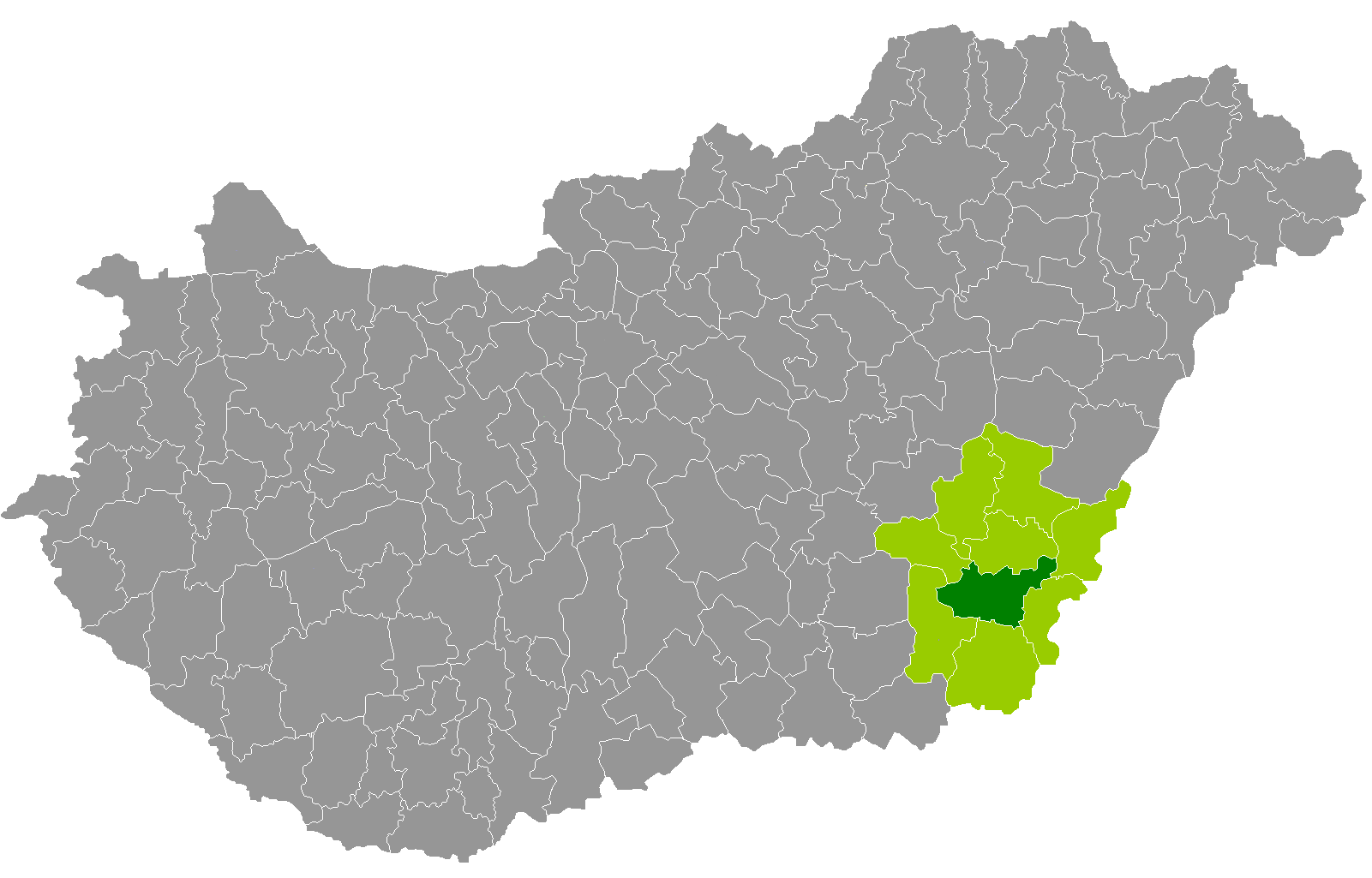
- Békéscsaba District within Hungary and Békés County.
- Country: Hungary
- County: Békés
- District seat: Békéscsaba

Area
  - Total: 636.16 km^{2} (245.62 sq mi)
  - Rank: 5th in Békés

Population (2011 census)
  - Total: 83,541
  - Rank: 1st in Békés
  - Density: 131/km^{2} (340/sq mi)

Békéscsaba (Hungarian: Békéscsabai járás) is a district in central-southern part of Békés County. Békéscsaba is also the name of the town where the district seat is found. The district is located in the Southern Great Plain Statistical Region.

== Geography ==
Békéscsaba District borders with Békés District to the north, Sarkad District and Gyula District to the east, Mezőkovácsháza District to the south, Orosháza District and Szarvas District to the west. The number of the inhabited places in Békéscsaba District is 9.

== Municipalities ==
The district has 1 urban county, 2 towns, 1 large village and 5 villages. (ordered by population, as of 1 January 2012)

- **Békéscsaba** (63,752) – district and county seat
- Csabaszabadi (335)
- **Csorvás** (4,981)
- Doboz (4,167)
- Gerendás (1,311)
- Kétsoprony (1,428)
- Szabadkígyós (2,696)
- Telekgerendás (1,549)
- **Újkígyós** (5,235)

The bolded municipalities are cities, italics municipality is large village.

== Demographics ==
Religion in Békéscsaba District (2011 census)
1. Catholic Church (21.1%)
2. Greek Catholicism (0.20%)
3. Lutheranism (11.3%)
4. Calvinism (7.20%)
5. Orthodoxy (0.20%)
6. Other religions (1.70%)
7. Non-religious (31.6%)
8. Atheists (1.50%)
9. Undeclared (25.2%)

In 2011, it had a population of 83,541 and the population density was 131/km².

Year	County population	Change
2011	83,541	n/a

=== Ethnicity ===
Besides the Hungarian majority, the main minorities are the Slovak (approx. 3,500), Roma (900), Romanian (500) and German (450).

Total population (2011 census): 83,541
Ethnic groups (2011 census): Identified themselves: 78,408 persons:

- Hungarians: 72,018 (91.85%)
- Slovaks: 3,504 (4.47%)
- Gypsies: 916 (1.17%)
- Others and indefinable: 1,970 (2.51%)

Approx. 5,000 persons in Békéscsaba District did not declare their ethnic group at the 2011 census.

=== Religion ===
Religious adherence in the county according to 2011 census:

- Catholic – 17,821 (Roman Catholic – 17,627; Greek Catholic – 184);
- Evangelical – 9,444;
- Reformed – 6,031;
- Orthodox – 149;
- other religions – 1,404;
- Non-religious – 26,364;
- Atheism – 1,289;
- Undeclared – 21,039.

== Gallery ==
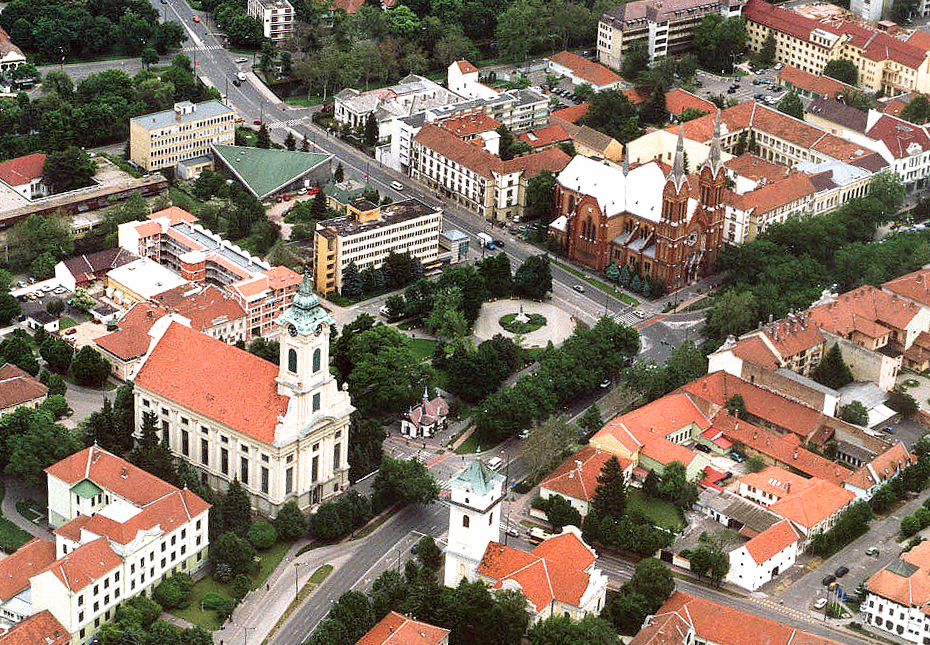
Békéscsaba, the district seat

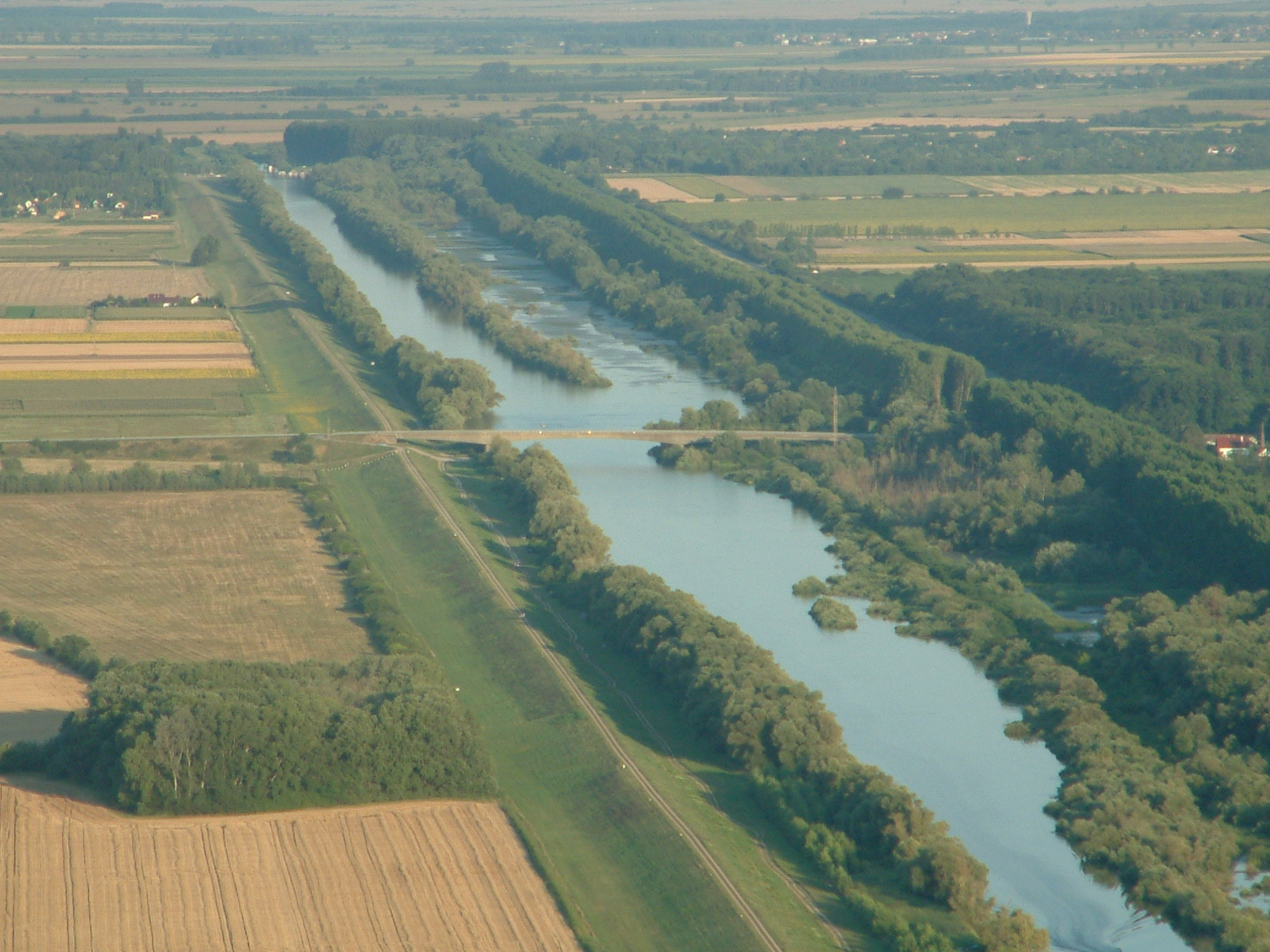
Bridge over Kettős-Körös near Doboz

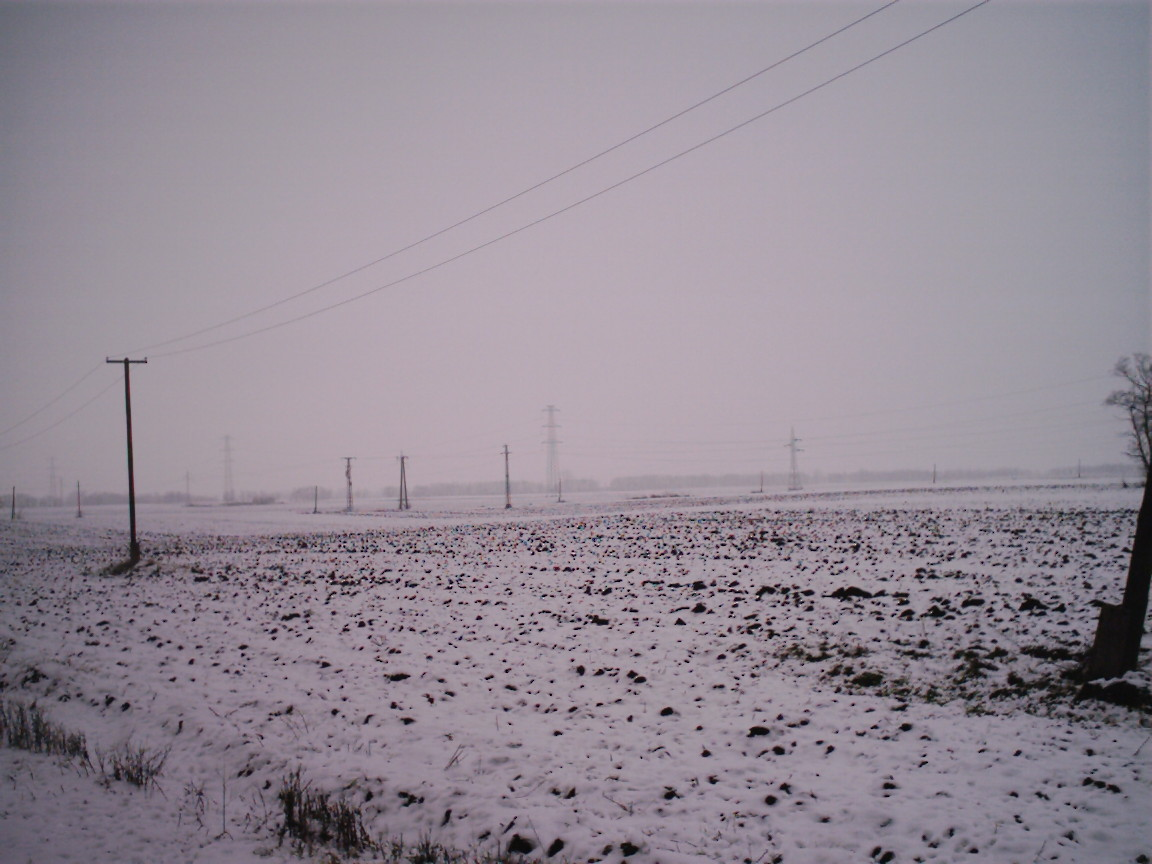
Winter landscape near Csorvás

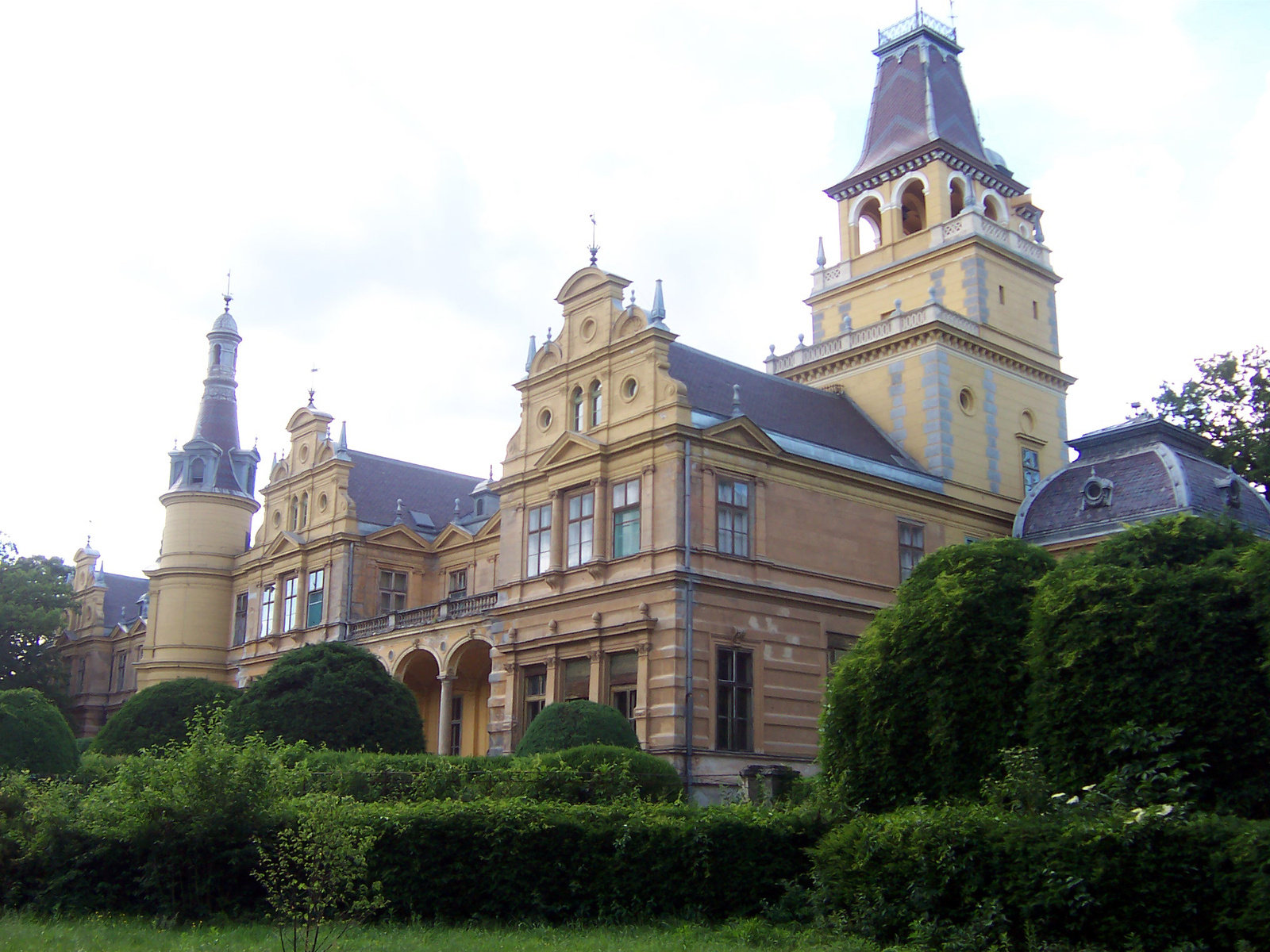
Wenckheim Mansion in Szabadkígyós

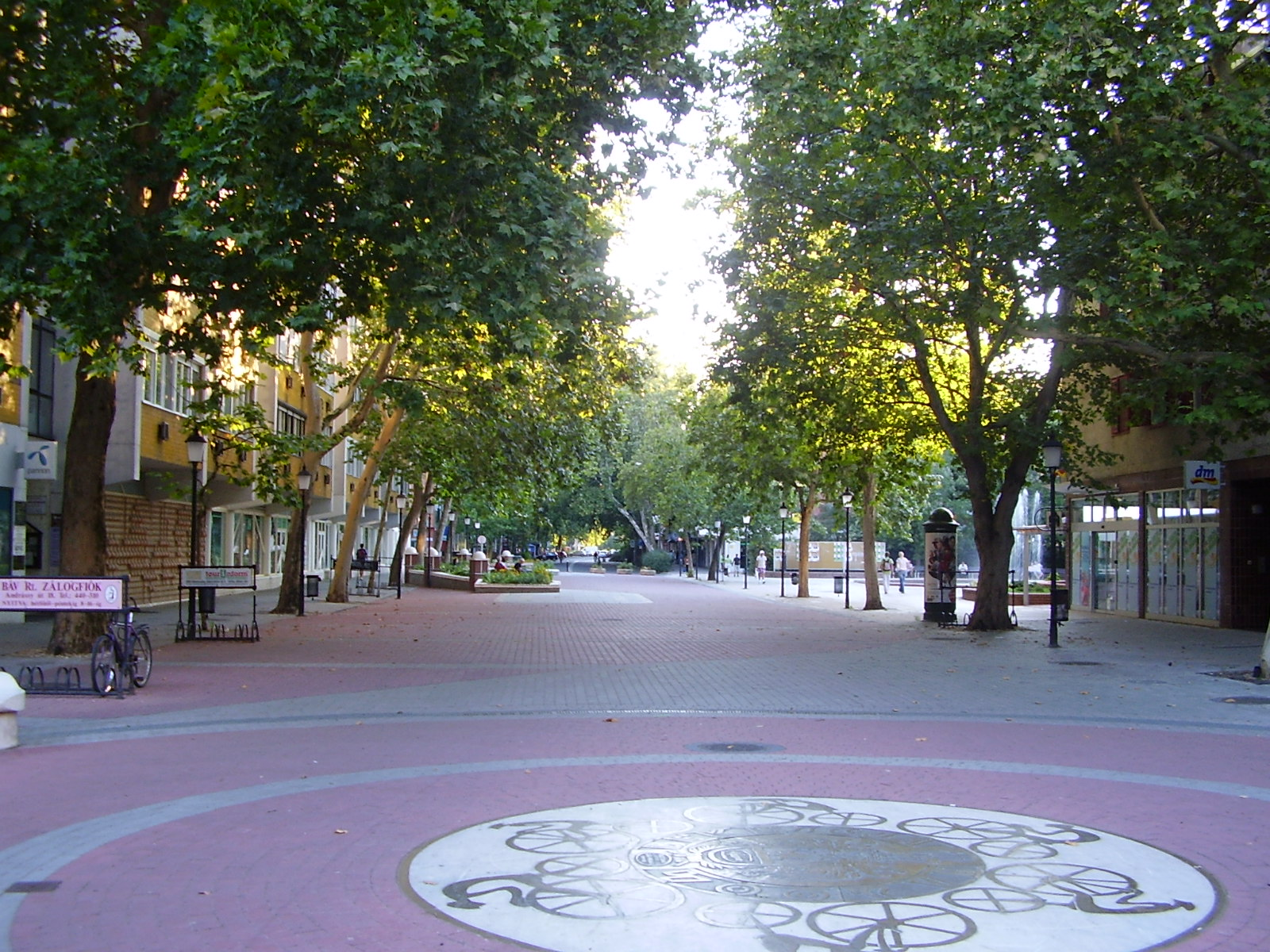
Downtown of Békéscsaba

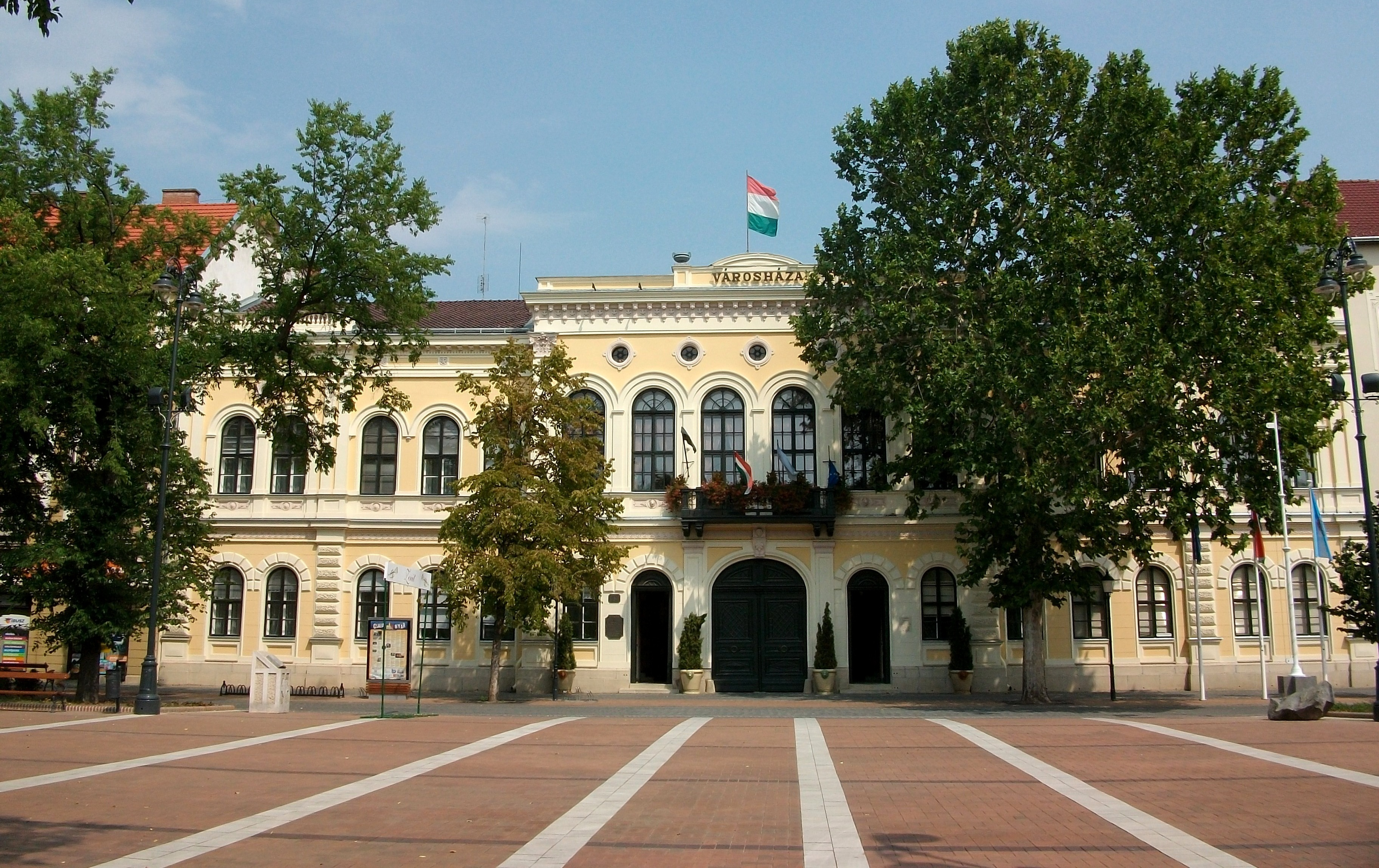
Town Hall in Békéscsaba

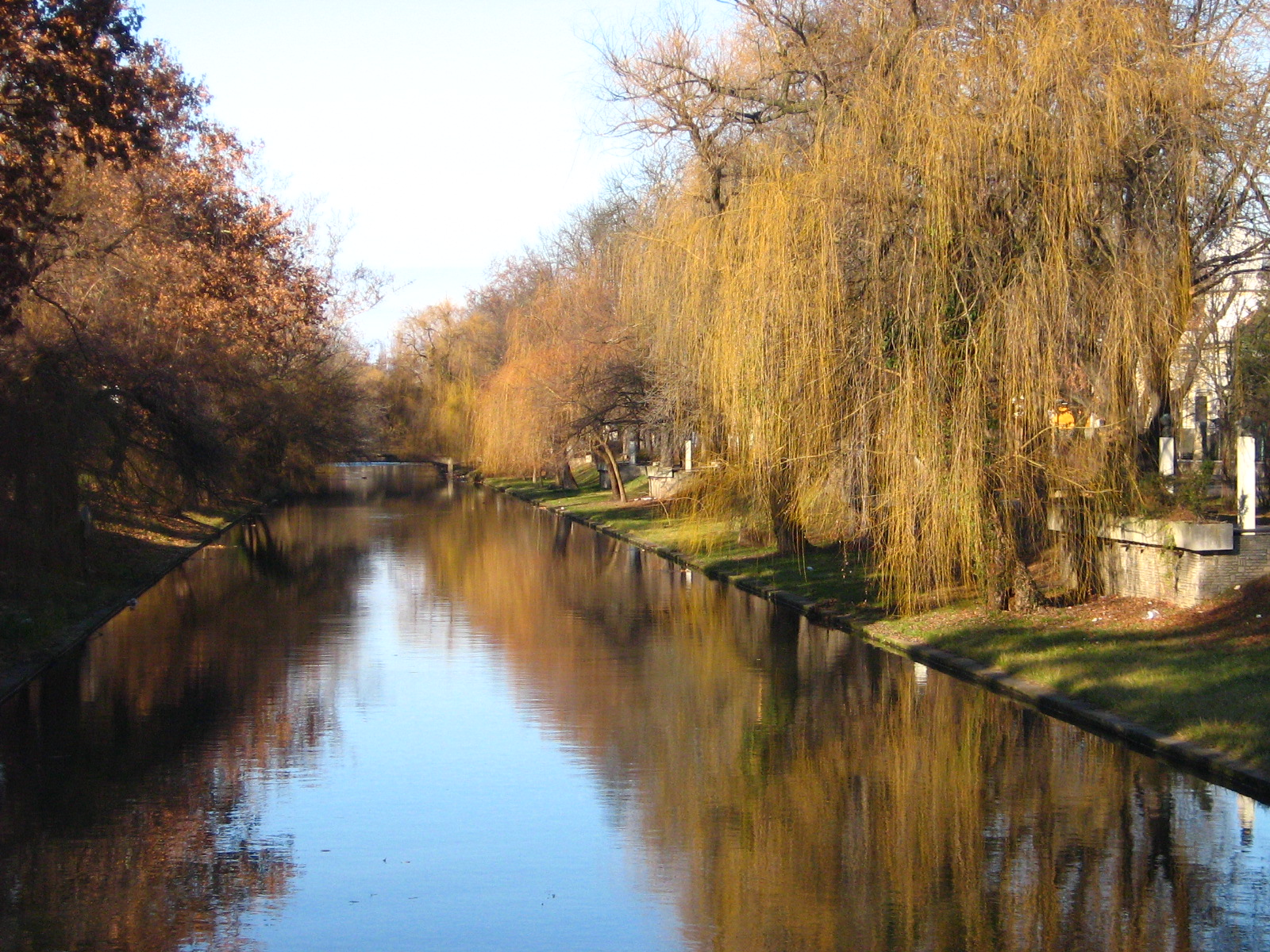
Élővíz Canal in Békéscsaba

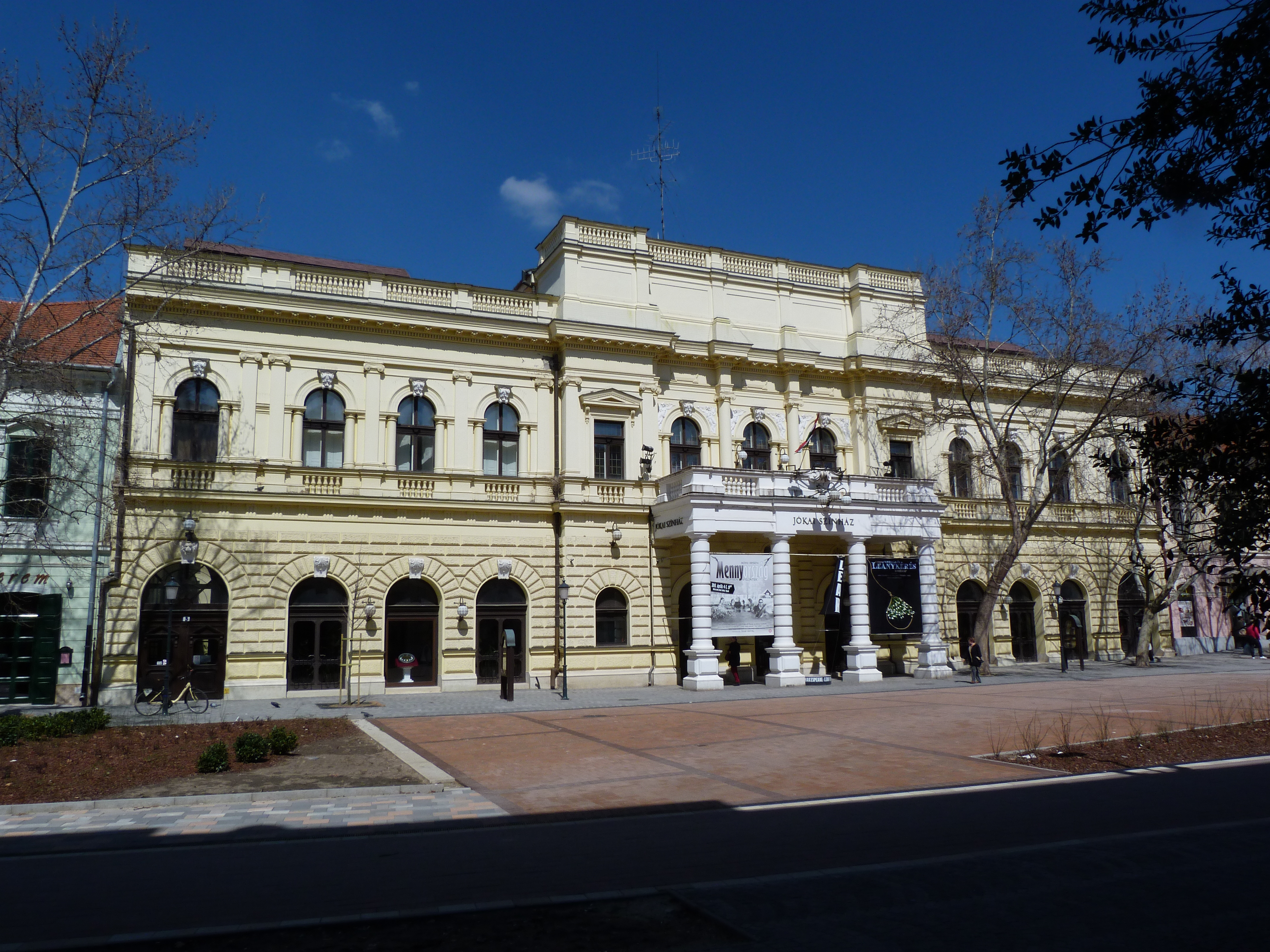
Jókai Theater (Békéscsaba)

== See also ==
- List of cities and towns of Hungary
