= Gyula District =

Gyula District Gyulai járás
- District
- Coat of arms

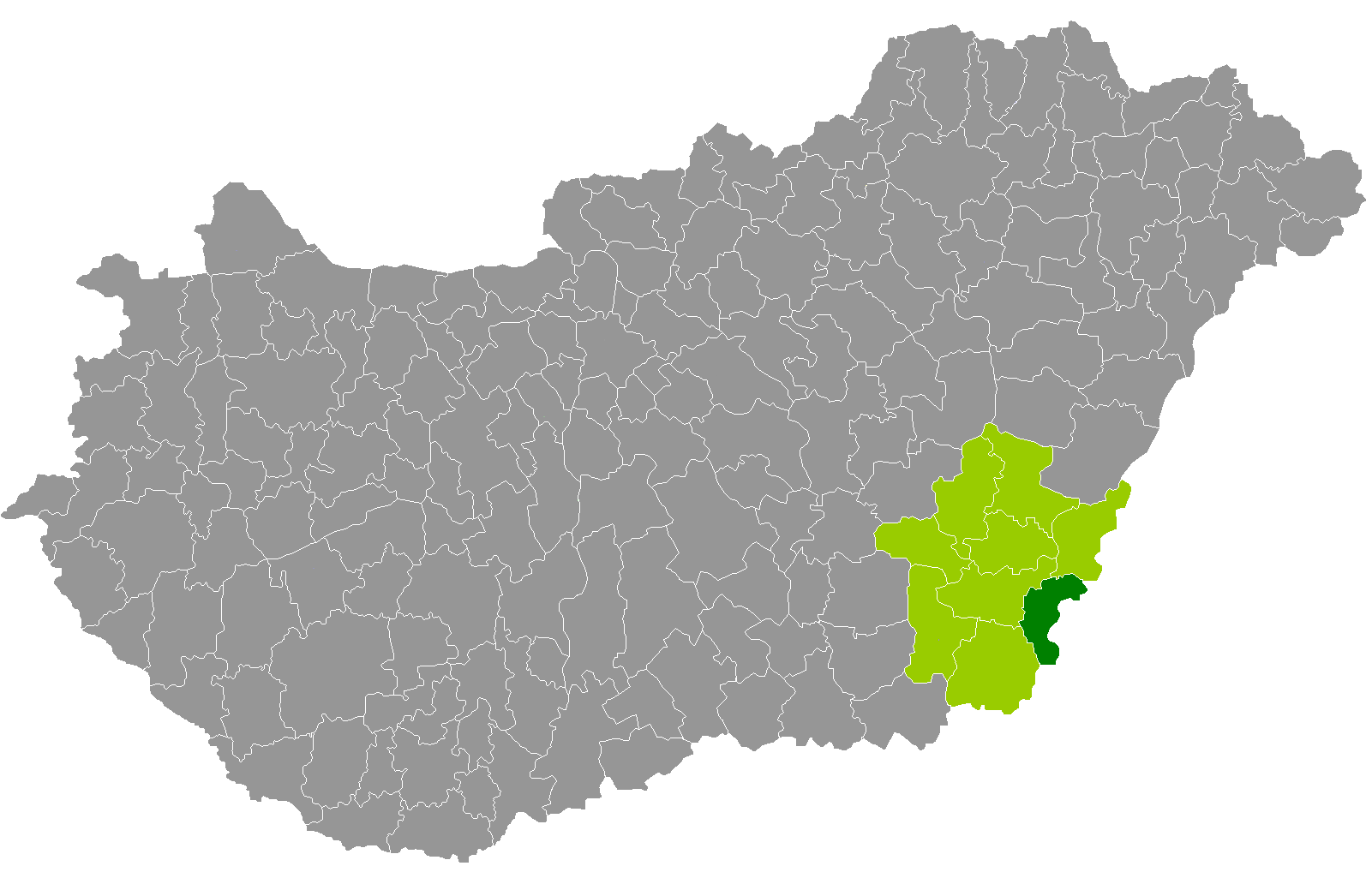
- Gyula District within Hungary and Békés County.
- Coordinates: 46.64°N 21.28°E
- Country: Hungary
- County: Békés
- District seat: Gyula

Area
  - Total: 413.22 km^{2} (159.55 sq mi)
  - Rank: 9th in Békés

Population (2011 census)
  - Total: 41,627
  - Rank: 3rd in Békés
  - Density: 101/km^{2} (260/sq mi)

Gyula (Hungarian: Gyulai járás; Romanian: Districtul Jula) is a district in eastern part of Békés County. Gyula is also the name of the town where the district seat is found. The district is located in the Southern Great Plain Statistical Region.

== Geography ==
Gyula District borders with Sarkad District to the north, the Romanian county of Arad to the east and south, Mezőkovácsháza District to the southwest, Békéscsaba District to the west. The number of the inhabited places in Gyula District is 4.

== Municipalities ==
The district has 2 towns, 1 large village and 1 village. (ordered by population, as of 1 January 2012)

- **Elek** (4,816)
- **Gyula** (31,679) – district seat
- Kétegyháza (4,007)
- Lőkösháza (1,762)

The bolded municipalities are cities, italics municipality is large village.

== Demographics ==
Religion in Gyula District (2011 census)
1. Catholic Church (20.4%)
2. Greek Catholicism (0.60%)
3. Calvinism (14.9%)
4. Lutheranism (1.50%)
5. Orthodoxy (3.40%)
6. Other religions (2.80%)
7. Non-religious (26.9%)
8. Atheists (1.40%)
9. Undeclared (28.1%)

In 2011, it had a population of 41,627 and the population density was 101/km^{2}.

Year	County population	Change
2011	41,627	n/a

=== Ethnicity ===
Besides the Hungarian majority, the main minorities are the Romanian (approx. 2,500), German (1,250), Roma (1,000) and Slovak (150).

Total population (2011 census): 41,627
Ethnic groups (2011 census): Identified themselves: 39,664 persons:

- Hungarians: 34,700 (87.48%)
- Romanians: 2,382 (6.01%)
- Germans: 1,252 (3.16%)
- Romani: 808 (2.04%)
- Others and indefinable: 522 (1.32%)

Approx. 2,000 persons in Gyula District did not declare their ethnic group at the 2011 census.

=== Religion ===
Religious adherence in the county according to 2011 census:

- Catholic – 8,722 (Roman Catholic – 8,474; Greek Catholic – 244);
- Reformed – 6,191;
- Orthodox – 1,431;
- Evangelical – 625;
- other religions – 1,183;
- Non-religious – 11,197;
- Atheism – 571;
- Undeclared – 11,707.

== Gallery ==
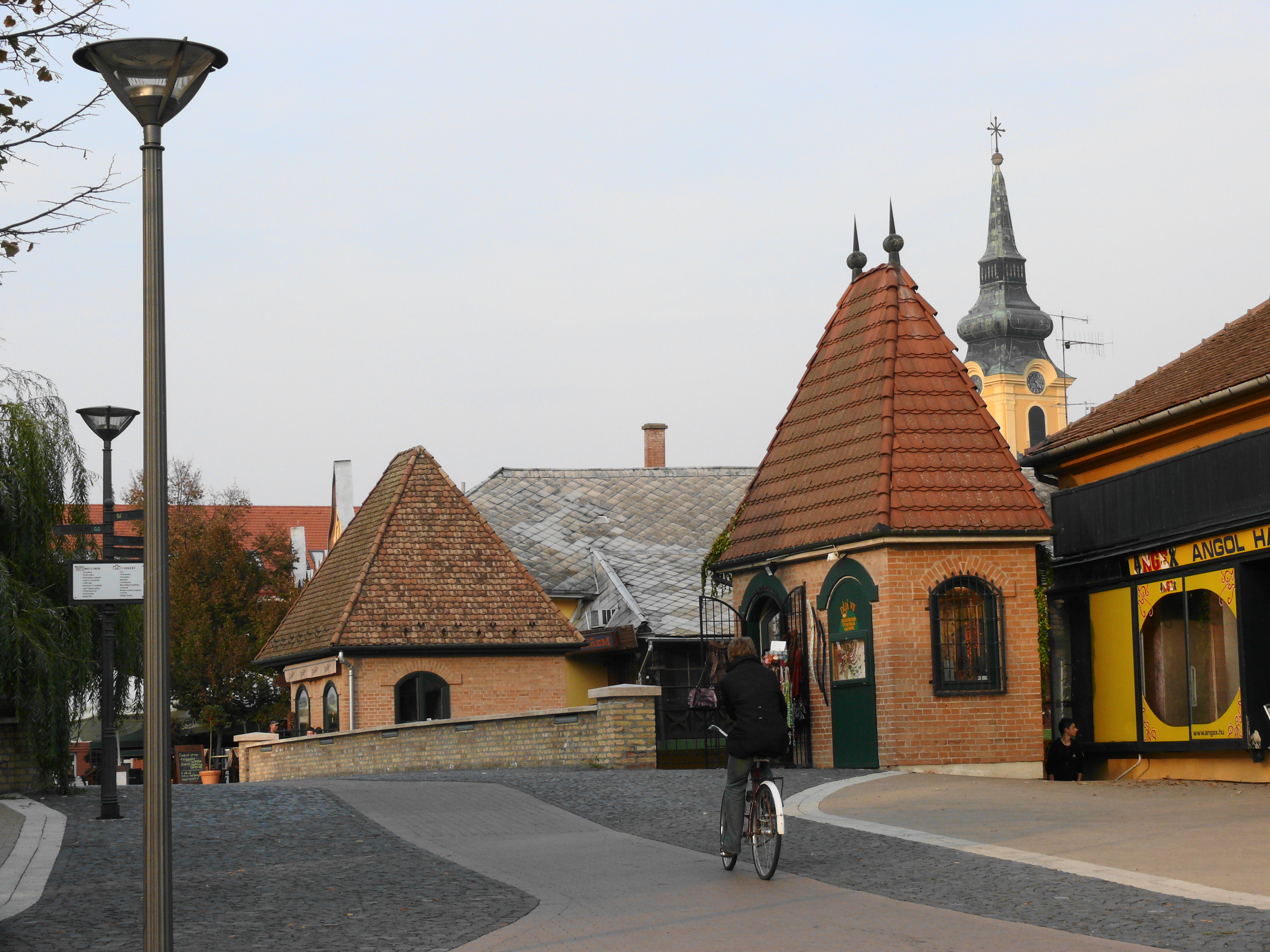
Gyula, the district seat

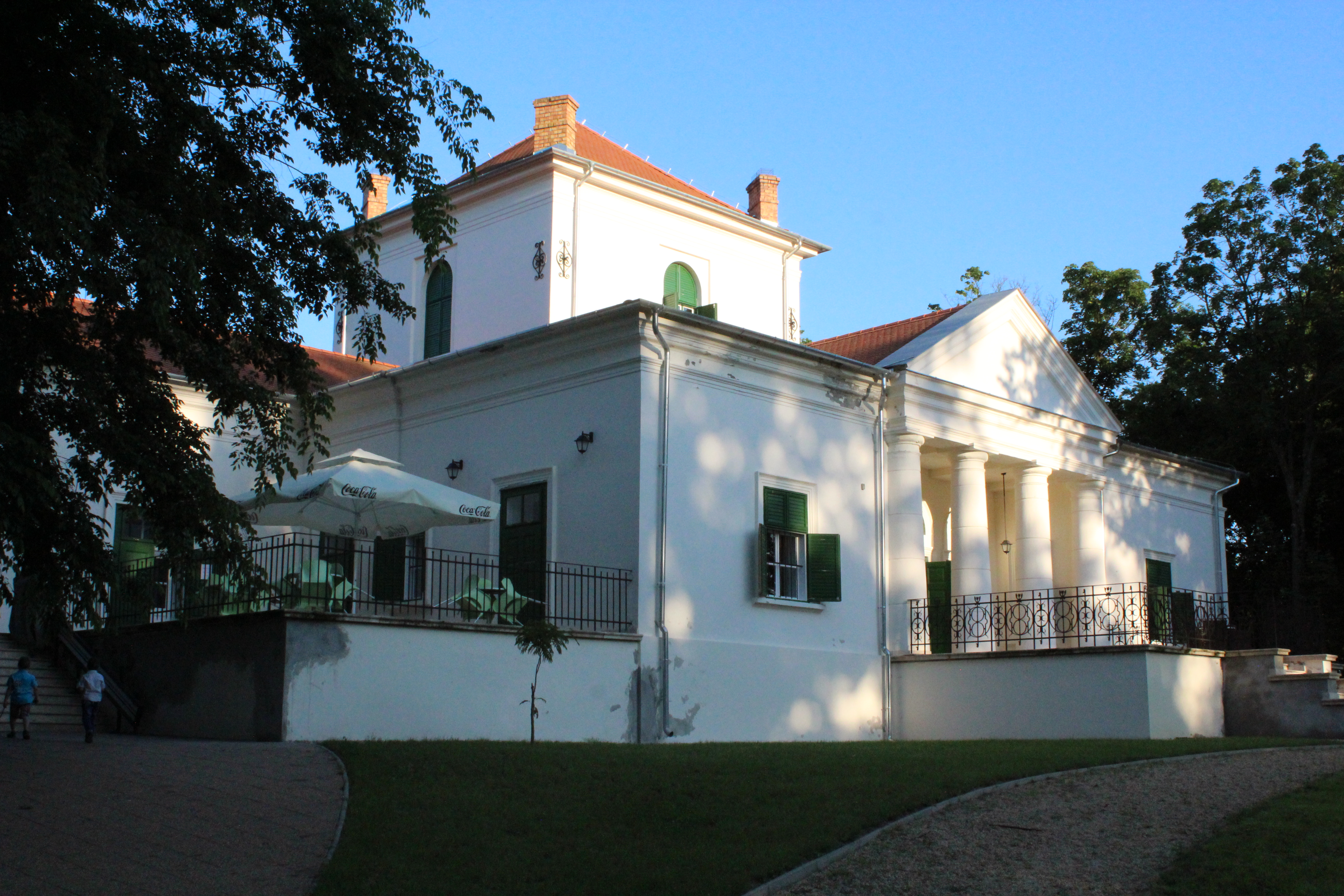
Vásárhelyi-Bréda Mansion in Lőkösháza

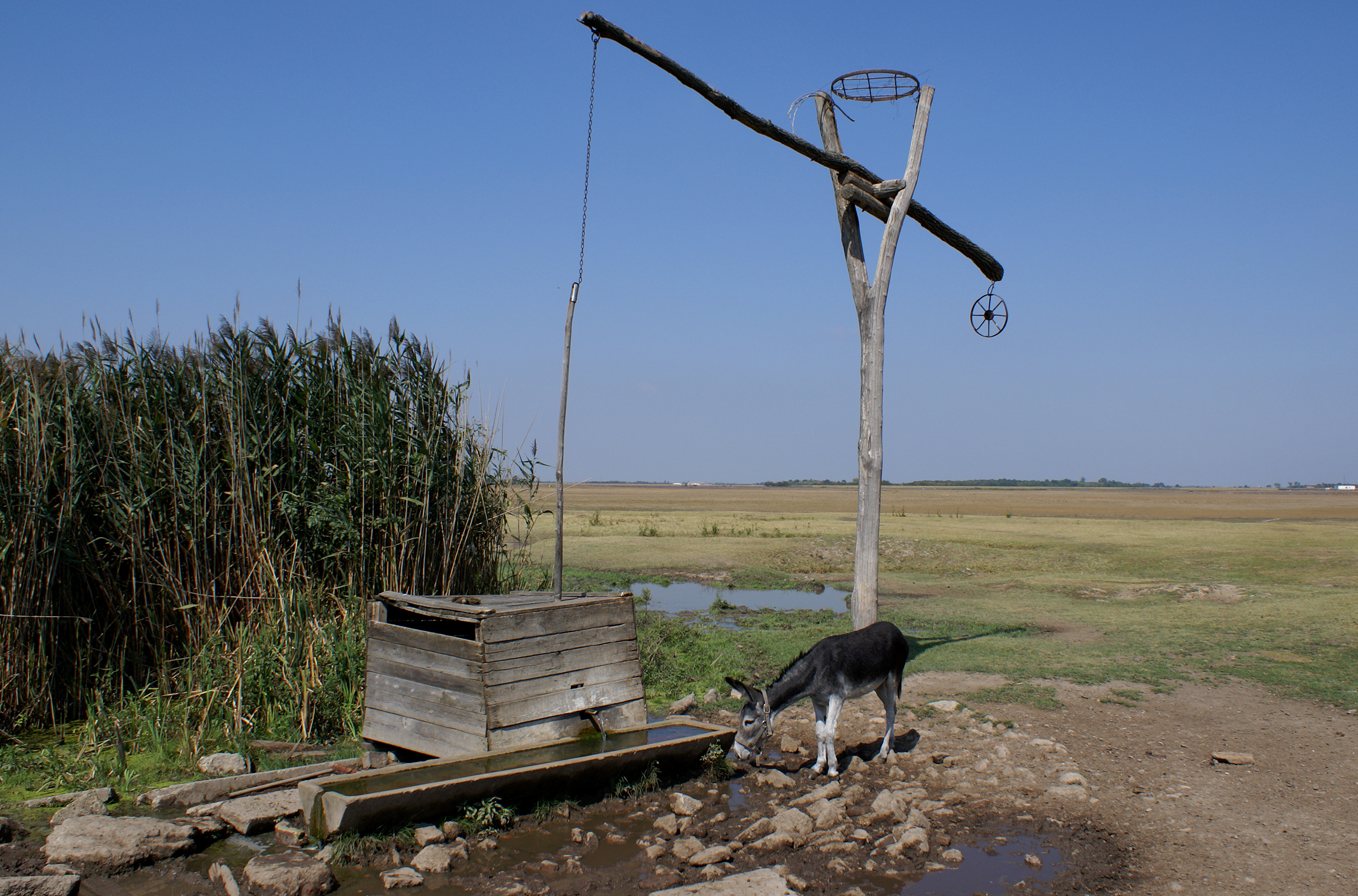
Landscape near Gyula

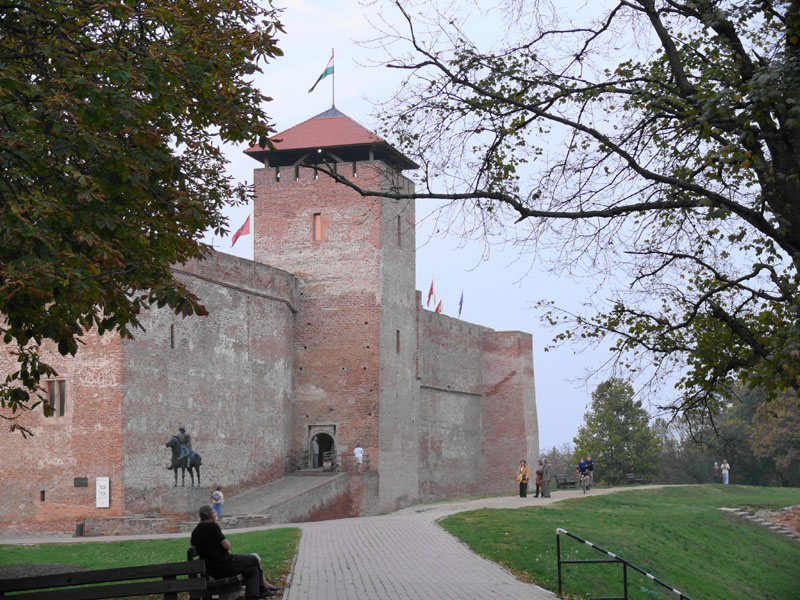
Gyula Castle

== See also ==
- List of cities and towns of Hungary
