= Csorvás =

- Town
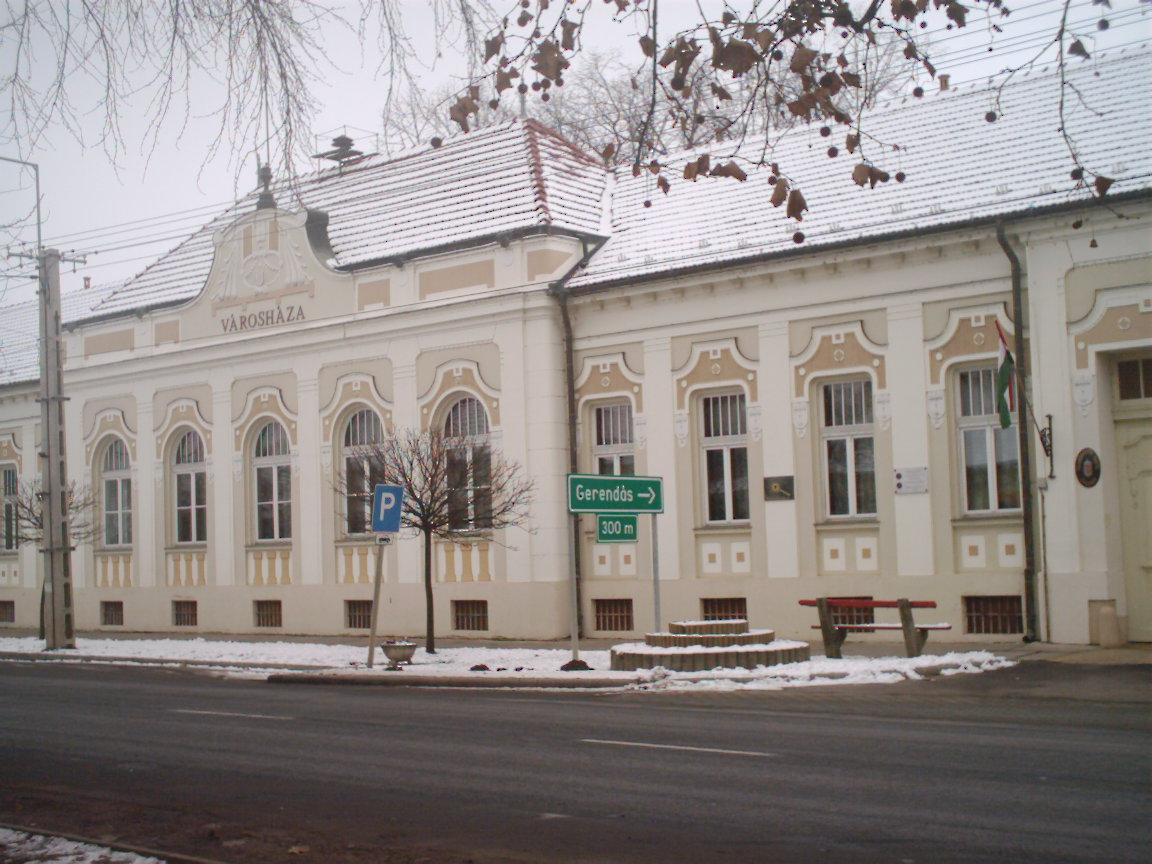
- Town hall

- Flag Coat of arms

- Location within Hungary
- Coordinates: 46.63477°N 20.83355°E
- Country: Hungary
- County: Békés
- District: Békéscsaba

Area
  - Total: 90.18 km^{2} (34.82 sq mi)

Population (2015)
  - Total: 4,871
  - Density: 54.01/km^{2} (139.9/sq mi)
- Time zone: UTC+1 (CET)
  - Summer (DST): UTC+2 (CEST)
- Postal code: 5920
- Area code: (+36) 66
- Website: www.csorvas.hu

Csorvás (Romanian: Ciorvaș) is a town in Békés county, in the Southern Great Plain region of south-east Hungary.

== Geography ==
It covers an area of 90.18 km^{2} and has a population of 4,871 people (2015).

The town of Csorvás is situated in Békés county, next to the main road No. 47. The first written record of the town is from 1217 but Csorvás became an independent settlement in 1857. The town has a symmetrical lay-out and has been rebuilt three times during its history. During the excavations, archeologists found church ruins from the age of the Árpáds.

The development of the town is founded on the talent and diligence of its Hungarian, Slovak and Romanian inhabitants. At the time, agriculture was the primary industry and the settlement’s output was predominantly wheat, maize and pig and cattle breeding.

With the arrival of the Nagyvárad-Fiume railway line in 1871, Csorvás became the main transport centre for agricultural produce. By 1970, Csorvás was a large village with sufficiently developed infrastructure and canalization to ensure water and natural gas were readily available to inhabitants of the whole area.

The town contains the “Unified Social Home”, a full scale specialized service for the old and infirm. Subsidized housing for the towns’ young people is also available.

Csorvás now has a modern developed town centre, as well as three churches and a chapel around Szabadság Square. The town also contains a big park decorated with pieces of fine art. The outskirts of the town are designated “greenbelt” areas where the “Transylvanian Hérics” (a protected flower) thrives.

The village host several annual festivals. In March the “International Folklore Meeting” is organized to commemorate marriage of Béla Bartók's parents in Roman Catholic church. In June, the “Harvest Race” is held and include demonstration of the traditional threshing process. In addition, the International Wedding Gastronomical Days is held at the end of July, and the dedication festival is on the first Sunday after 15 October.

Our 15 representatives, 21 NGOs (Non- Governmental Organization) and 5667 Csorvás residents do a substantial amount to develop the area. As of July 1, 2005, Csorvás is officially the youngest town in Békés county.

== Twin towns – sister cities ==
Csorvás is twinned with:

- Ozun, Romania
- Sládkovičovo, Slovakia
- Gornji Breg, Serbia

== People ==
- Zoltán Fülöp
