= Elek =

- Town
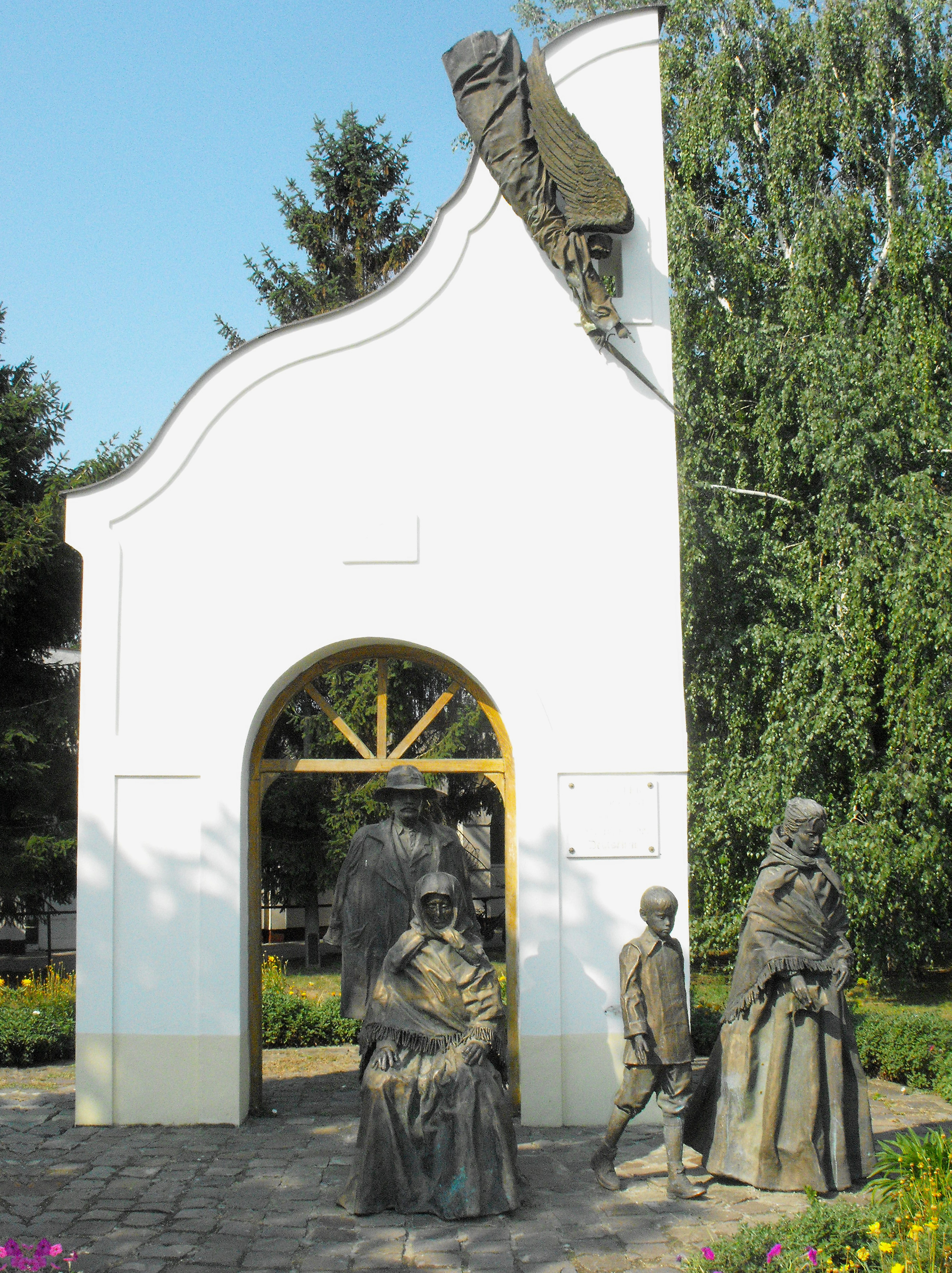
- Monument of the deported Germans

- Flag Coat of arms

- Location within Hungary
- Coordinates: 46.528°N 21.247°E
- Country: Hungary
- County: Békés
- District: Gyula

Area
  - Total: 54.94 km^{2} (21.21 sq mi)

Population (2012)
  - Total: 4,816
  - Density: 87.66/km^{2} (227.0/sq mi)
- Time zone: UTC+1 (CET)
  - Summer (DST): UTC+2 (CEST)
- Postal code: 5742
- Area code: (+36) 66
- Website: www.elek.hu

Elek (German: Renndorf, Romanian: Aletea) is a town in Békés County, in the Southern Great Plain region of south-east Hungary. Until the Second World War, the town was home to the largest concentration of Germans in the county, with its population consisting almost entirely of Swabians. Jews lived in the city as early as the 19th century and in 1944 many of them were murdered by the Nazis in the Holocaust.

== Geography ==
The town covers an area of 54.94 km^{2} (21.21 sq mi) and had a population of 5,567 in 2002.

== History ==
- 1232 : First mentioned
- 1566-1696 : Ottoman rule (Ottoman wars in Europe)
- 1724 : settling of German colonists (predominantly from Franconia)
- 1739 : Bubonic plague
- 1894 : Artesian aquifer
- 1920 : Elek becomes border town (Treaty of Trianon)
- 1946 : Expulsion of German inhabitants
- 1996 : Elek gains town status

Year	Population
1802	1,200
1835	2,500
1890	5,700
1930	8,400
1940	9,300
2000	5,500
2010	4,985
2019	4,816

=== Twin towns ===
Elek is twinned with:

- Gerolzhofen, Germany (1990)
- Alerheim, Germany (1992)
- Leimen, Germany (1992)
- Sebiș (Borossebes), Romania (1992)
- Gerlingen, Germany
- Laudenbach, Germany (1994)
- Veľké Kapušany (Nagykapocs), Slovakia (1996)
- Grăniceri (Ottlaka), Romania (1997)
- Dumbrava (Igazfalva), Romania (2019)
