= Loránd Kesztyűs =

Hungarian physician and immunologist

Loránd Kesztyűs (Sarkad, Hungary, 11 April 1915 − Debrecen, Hungary, 17 August 1979) was a Hungarian physician, immunologist, pathophysiologist, a full member of the Hungarian Academy of Sciences.

== Career ==
He studied at the University of Debrecen until 1938, then worked at the Physiological and General Pathological Institute of the university. In 1948 he was appointed director of the Pathophysiological Institute of Debrecen, a post which he held until his death. During his directorship the institute became the research center of immunology in Hungary. Antibodies to muscle proteins were first prepared by Kesztyűs and his team; they also studied the reaction of these antibodies with the muscle protein antigens.

During the early period of his career he studied - together with István Went - antibodies and flavins, on the ground of their researches they could successfully produce immunizer pharmaceutical drugs used as treatment for allergies. Later he investigated the relationship between nervous system and immunity, and stated that despite the neurological understanding being in force at that time the nervous system doesn't impact either on production of antibodies, or on anaphylaxis.

He was a corresponding (1967), then a full member (1976) of the Hungarian Academy of Sciences, and the founder and first chairman of the Hungarian Immunological Society (1971).

== Works ==
- A kórélettan tankönyve. [Lectures on pathophysiology.] Budapest, Medicina, 1963, 587 p. (With József Sós)
- Immunität und Nervensystem. Budapest, Akadémiai, 1967, 159 p.
- Kórélettan. [Pathophysiology.] Budapest, Medicina, 1975, 762 p.
