= Újszalonta =

Coordinates: 46°48′N 21°30′E

- Interactive map of Újszalonta
- Country: Hungary
- Region: Southern Great Plain
- County: Békés
- District: Sarkad

Area
  - Total: 20.84 km^{2} (8.05 sq mi)

Population (2002)
  - Total: 141
  - Density: 7/km^{2} (18/sq mi)
- Time zone: UTC+1 (CET)
  - Summer (DST): UTC+2 (CEST)
- Postal code: 5727
- Area code: 66

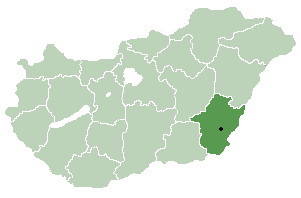
Location of Békés County in Hungary

Újszalonta is a village in Békés County, in the Southern Great Plain region of southeast Hungary.

== Geography ==
It covers an area of 20.84 km^{2} and has a population of 141 people (2002).
