= Doboz =

- Large village
- Coat of arms
- Interactive map of Doboz
- Coordinates: 46°44′N 21°15′E
- Country: Hungary
- County: Békés
- District: Békéscsaba

Area
  - Total: 54.47 km^{2} (21.03 sq mi)

Population (2015)
  - Total: 4,084
  - Density: 75/km^{2} (190/sq mi)
- Time zone: UTC+1 (CET)
  - Summer (DST): UTC+2 (CEST)
- Postal code: 5624
- Area code: (+36) 66

Doboz is a village in Békés County, in the Southern Great Plain region of south-east Hungary. Doboz is situated along the river Crișul Alb after it enters Hungary from Romania.

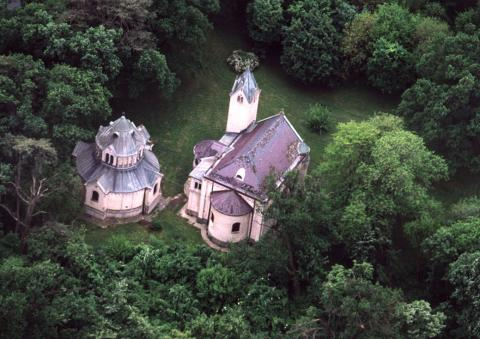
Aerial photography of Doboz

== Geography ==
It covers an area of 54.47 km^{2} and has a population of 4,084 people (2015).

== Notable people ==
- Mihály Mező (born 1978), singer and musician, was raised here
