= Bélmegyer =

Coordinates: 46°52′N 21°11′E

- Coat of arms

- Location within Hungary
- Country: Hungary
- County: Békés

Area
  - Total: 63.05 km^{2} (24.34 sq mi)

Population (2015)
  - Total: 968
  - Density: 15.4/km^{2} (40/sq mi)
- Time zone: UTC+1 (CET)
  - Summer (DST): UTC+2 (CEST)
- Postal code: 5643
- Area code: 66

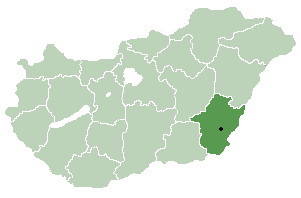
Location of Békés County in Hungary

Bélmegyer is a village in Békés County, in the Southern Great Plain region of south-east Hungary.

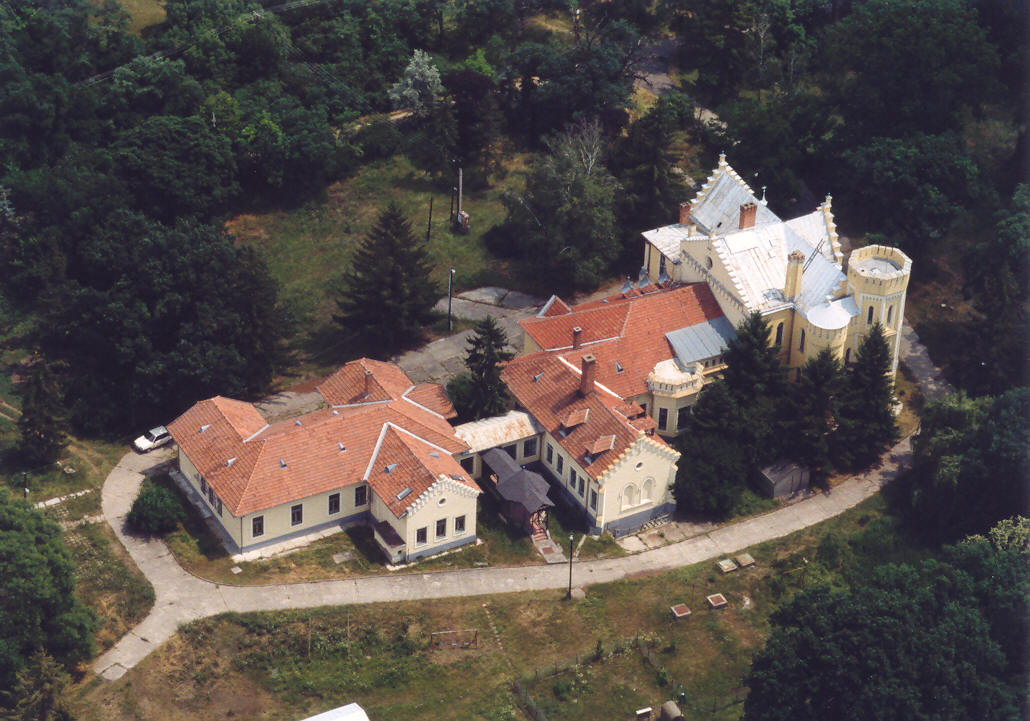
Bélmegyer Palace

== Geography ==
It covers an area of 63.05 km^{2} and has a population of 968 people (2015).
