= Körösnagyharsány =

- Location within Hungary
- Coordinates: 47°0′N 21°39′E
- Country: Hungary
- County: Békés

Area
  - Total: 19.93 km^{2} (7.70 sq mi)

Population (2002)
  - Total: 698
  - Density: 35/km^{2} (91/sq mi)
- Time zone: UTC+1 (CET)
  - Summer (DST): UTC+2 (CEST)
- Postal code: 5539
- Area code: 66

Körösnagyharsány (Körös-Nagy-Harsány) is a village in Békés County, in the Southern Great Plain region of south-east Hungary.

== Geography ==
Körösnagyharsány is a small village in Békés county, close to the Romanian border. It covers an area of 19.93 km^{2} and had a population of 698 in 2002.

== History ==
The name of the village is originated by scholars from the time of the Hungarian conquest of the Carpathian Basin. Right before the home-taking conquest, three Kabar tribes joined the Hungarians, one of the names of those tribes was Harsány.

Körösnagyharsány was first mentioned at the beginning of the 14th century in book Regestrum Varadinense, in which one of the inhabitants of the village was summoned to an ordeal.

In 1234 Andrew II of Hungary was granted to Mester Demeter from genus Aba nemzetség. The name of the settlement at that time was written as Egyházasharsán (Harsán with Temple).

In 1241/1242, during the Mongol invasion of Europe the village was destroyed, but soon rebuilt by its former inhabitants.

For its faithful service Körösharsány was given the rank City of Hajdu by Stephen Bocskai.

In 1660, during the Turkish conquest of Hungary, the village was completely destroyed again by Habsburgs and Ottomans. After the destruction, the village was rebuilt on the left bank of the river Sebes-Körös, since when the city lies at its present place.

The settlement was mentioned later as Nagy- és Kisharsány (Large and Small Harsány) as a land of Capital Cathedral of Nagyvárad (present Oradea, Romania), that was still possessed it at the first half of the 19th century. Later, at the beginning of the 20th century Mrs. Gustav Elek had bigger properties worth mentioning.

Before the Treaty of Trianon, Körösnagyharsány belonged to Bihar County, district Cséffa.

After the Treaty of Trianon in 1920, Körösnagyharsány – which originally belonged to the sphere of influence of Nagyvárad – became a border settlement. After being cut from Nagyvárad, losing its trade and human connections with its vital city, started a process of depopulation.

=== The history of Jewry and their graveyard in Körösnagyharsány ===
For about one and a half centuries (1780s-1944), a small religious Jewish community, consisting mainly of small shopkeepers, innkeepers and tenant-farmers, lived in the settlement. In 1870, 47 Jews lived here. They built houses, established a graveyard and became an integral part of the society and life of the village. After the Treaty of Trianon the Jewish community slowly started to diminish, and then their fate was sealed by the Holocaust.

Four person were deported from the village: Móric Grósz (1887–1944), Jolán Grósz (1899–1944), Olga Grünhut (1905-1944/45) and Gyöngyi Grünhut (1925-1944/45). They died in concentration camps. During the time of deportation, though, members of several Jewish families from the countryside were hidden in the village.

=== Ethnic groups ===
In 1910, out of 1,411 inhabitants, a survey found 1336 Hungarians and 73 Romanians. Religious spread was 1,288 Calvinist, 73 Orthodox Christians and 19 Jewish.

The village is now mainly inhabited by Calvinist Hungarian families. Based on a survey made in 2001, 92% of the inhabitants of the village was Hungarian, 7% Gipsy, 1% Romanian.

== See also ==
- Jews in Bekes county
