= Sarkadtanya =

Sarkadtanya Sarkad (former name)
- Populated place
- Interactive map of Sarkadtanya
- Coordinates: 48°02′N 21°02′E
- Country: Hungary
- County: Borsod-Abaúj-Zemplén
- Municipality: Tiszalúc
- Time zone: UTC+1 (CET)
  - Summer (DST): UTC+2 (CEST)

Sarkadtanya (formerly Sarkad) is a populated place, now part of Tiszalúc, in the county of Borsod-Abaúj-Zemplén, Hungary.
