= Békés =

- Town
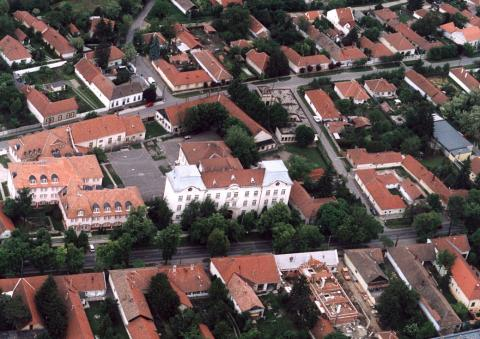
- Békés from above

- Flag Coat of arms

- Location within Hungary
- Coordinates: 46°46′N 21°08′E
- Country: Hungary
- County: Békés
- District: Békés

Area
  - Total: 127.23 km^{2} (49.12 sq mi)

Population (2012)
  - Total: 19,763
  - Density: 155.33/km^{2} (402.31/sq mi)
- Time zone: UTC+1 (CET)
  - Summer (DST): UTC+2 (CEST)
- Postal code: 5630
- Area code: (+36) 66
- Website: www.bekesvaros.hu

Békés (Hungarian pronunciation: [ˈbeːkeːʃ]; Romanian: Bichiș; Slovak: Békéš) is a town in Békés County, Hungary. It lies about 10 km (6 mi) north of Békéscsaba and 190 km (118 mi) east of Budapest.

== History ==
The area of the present town has been inhabited since ancient times, due to its good soil and proximity to rivers. After the Hungarians conquered the area, Békés and its surroundings were the property of the Csolt clan. Békés (the name means 'peaceful') was originally the name of the castle which gave its name to the comitatus, and, like many castles, was possibly named after its first steward. Many documents from the 13th century prove that Békés was the county seat. After 1403, when the area became the estate of the Maróthi family, Békés slowly lost its importance and the role of the centre of the comitatus was gradually taken over by Gyula.

In 1566, the castle of Gyula was occupied by the Ottoman army, and Békés fell under Ottoman rule too. The Ottomans built a motte castle in the town, but it was destroyed in 1595 when the Ottomans had to defend Gyula against the Hungarians who tried to reclaim it. The area became deserted. It was only exactly 100 years later, in 1695, that Békés was freed from Ottoman rule.

During the freedom fight led by Prince Francis II Rákóczi in the early 18th century the area of Békés was deserted again, for the last time. In 1720 John George Harruckern was granted Békés county via Royal Deed. He gave privileges to the serfs of the area, and gradually the population grew.

By the end of the 18th century, the town already had its present five districts and the Protestant, Roman Catholic and Greek Orthodox churches and the Jewish synagogue. The buildings of the Roman Catholic and Greek Orthodox churches and the Jewish Synagogue are all located within close proximity of each other. The annual floods of the Körös river meant a significant problem until the 1850s when the river was controlled.

In 1872, Békés was re-classified as a village. It was not until a hundred years later that it got its town status back.

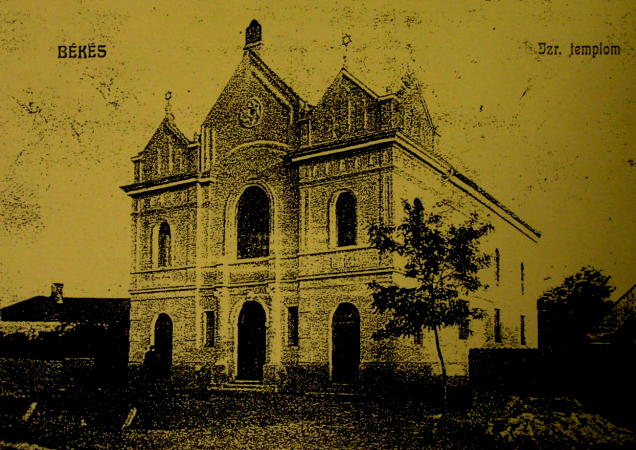
Békés Synagogue pre-1944

Around the start of the 20th century, Békés was rapidly developing and several new buildings were built. During the World Wars, there were no significant battles in the area. Békés was freed from the Nazis on October 6, 1944. After the war, industrialization quickened. On April 15, 1973, Békés was granted town status.

Today, Békés is made of several ethnic groups, including Hungarians, Roma, and with its near proximity to the Romanian border, Romanians who constitute approximately 5% of the population.

== Sights ==
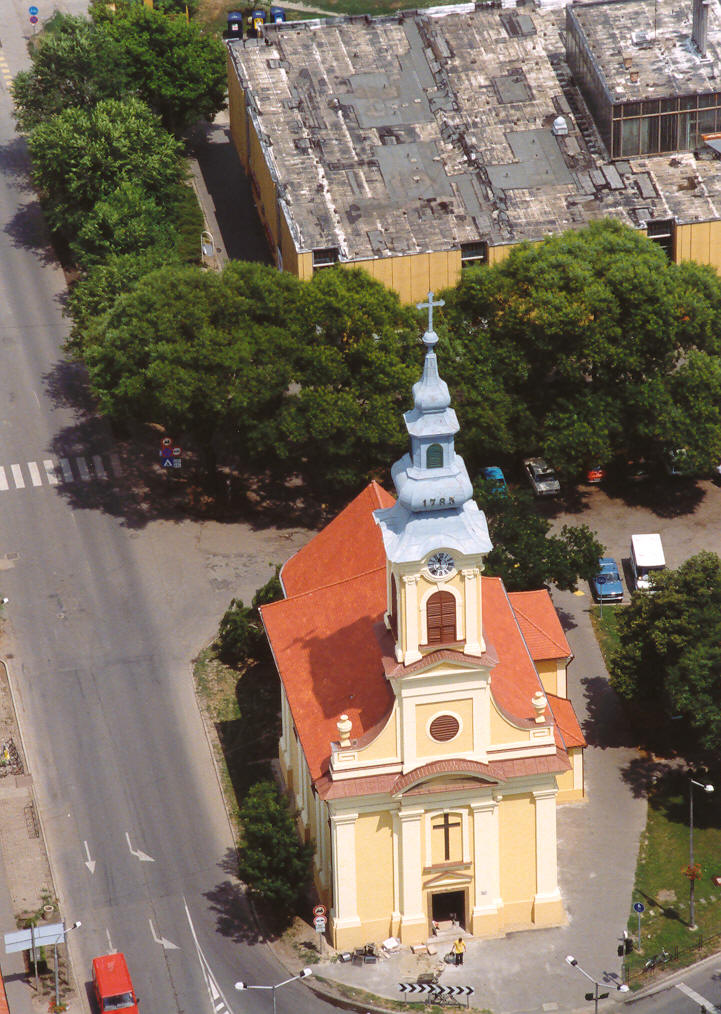
Aerial view of Roman Catholic church

- Széchenyi Square (main square) with several historical buildings
- Town hall
- Protestant church (Zopf style)
- Roman Catholic church (1795)
- Greek Orthodox church (one of the northernmost ones)
- Jewish synagogue (partially restored, interior and woman's gallery preserve its original form, now a pálinka center)
- School museum
- Several bridges on the backwaters of the regulated Körös river; Békés is called the "town of bridges" because of them
- Small-boat harbour

== Twin towns – sister cities ==
Békés is twinned with:

- Gheorgheni, Romania
- Myszków, Poland
- Novi Itebej (Žitiště), Serbia
