= Sarkad, Hungary =

Sarkad
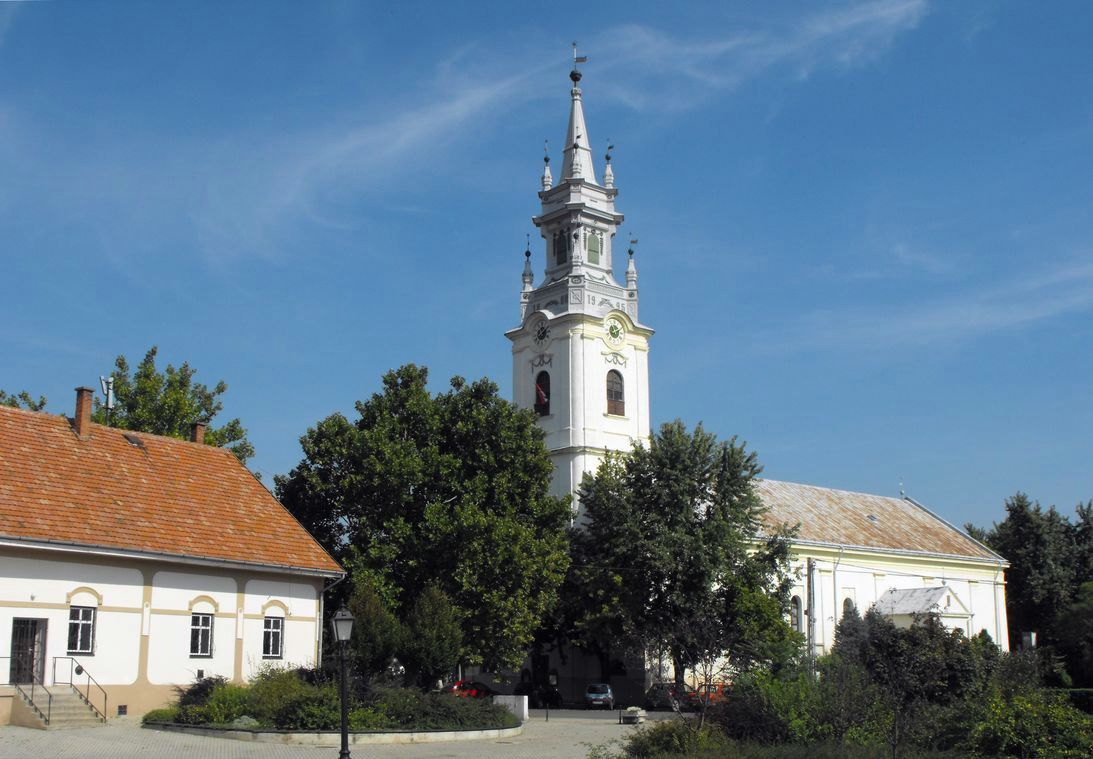

- Flag Coat of arms

- Location of Sarkad in Hungary
- Coordinates: 46°45′N 21°23′E
- Country: Hungary
- Region: Southern Great Plain
- County: Békés

Area
  - Total: 125.57 km^{2} (48.48 sq mi)

Population (2009)
  - Total: 10,463
  - Density: 83.324/km^{2} (215.81/sq mi)
- Time zone: UTC+1 (CET)
  - Summer (DST): UTC+2 (CEST)
- Postal code: 5720
- Area code: +36 66
- Website: http://www.sarkad.hu

Sarkad is a town in Békés County, Hungary.

== Location ==
- on the right bank of Fekete-Körös river
- 14 kilometres (9 mi) north of Gyula

== Twin towns – sister cities ==
Sarkad is twinned with:

- Baraolt, Romania
- Niestetal, Germany
- Salonta, Romania
- Snagov, Romania

== Notable people ==
- Sándor Képíró, gendarmerie captain
- Loránd Kesztyűs, physician, immunologist, and pathophysiologist
- Sándor Kónya, opera singer
