= Lajos Varga =

Hungarian gymnast

- Born: 23 November 1933 Gyoma, Kingdom of Hungary
- Died: 7 February 2006 (aged 72) Gyomaendrőd, Hungary
- Height: 1.65 m (5 ft 5 in)

Gymnastics career
- Discipline: Men's artistic gymnastics
- Country represented: Hungary
- Club: Újpesti Tornaegylet

Lajos Varga (23 November 1933 – 7 February 2006) was a Hungarian gymnast. He competed at the 1960 Summer Olympics and the 1964 Summer Olympics.
