= Szeghalom District =

Szeghalom District Szeghalmi járás
- Districts of Hungary
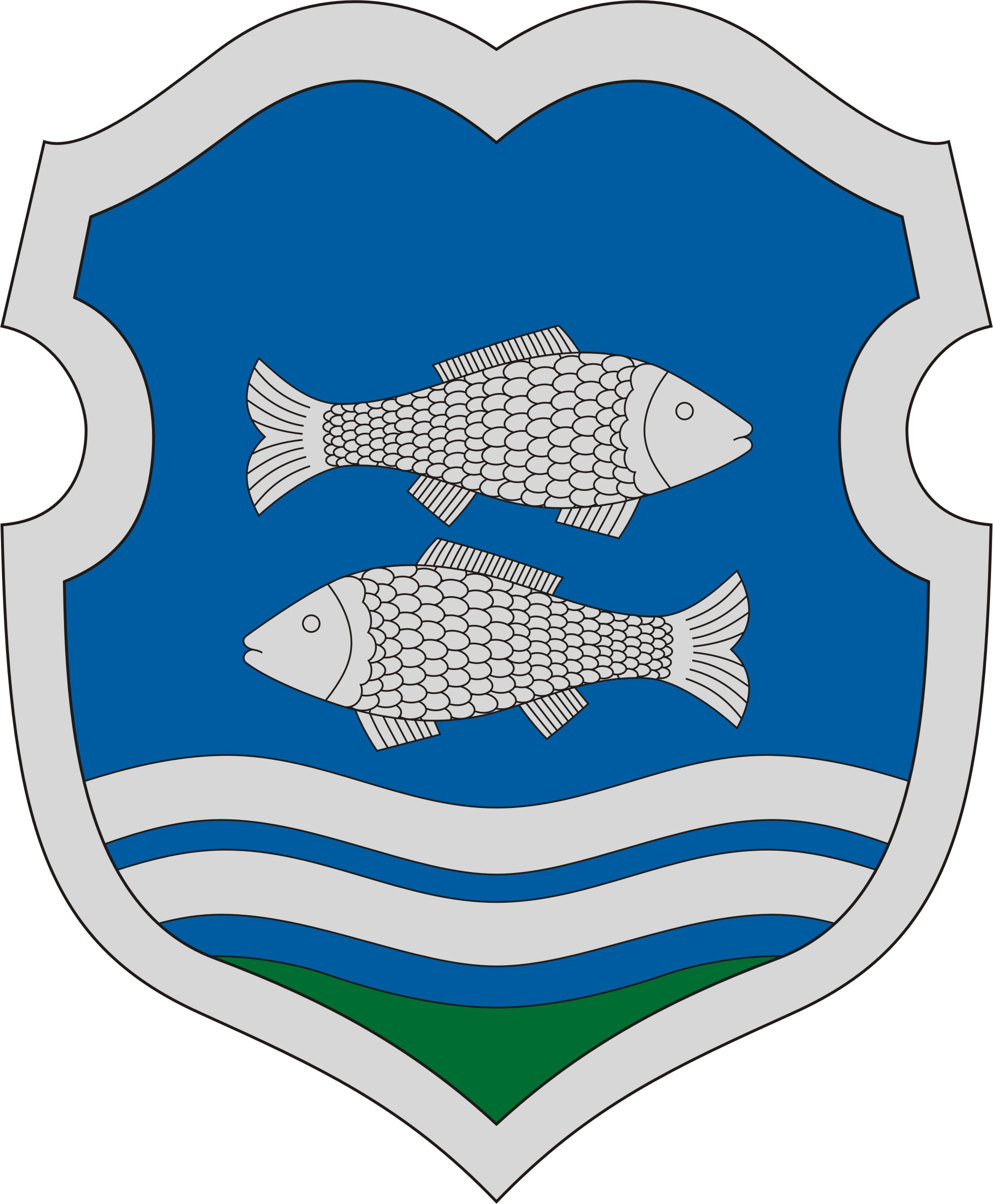
- Coat of arms

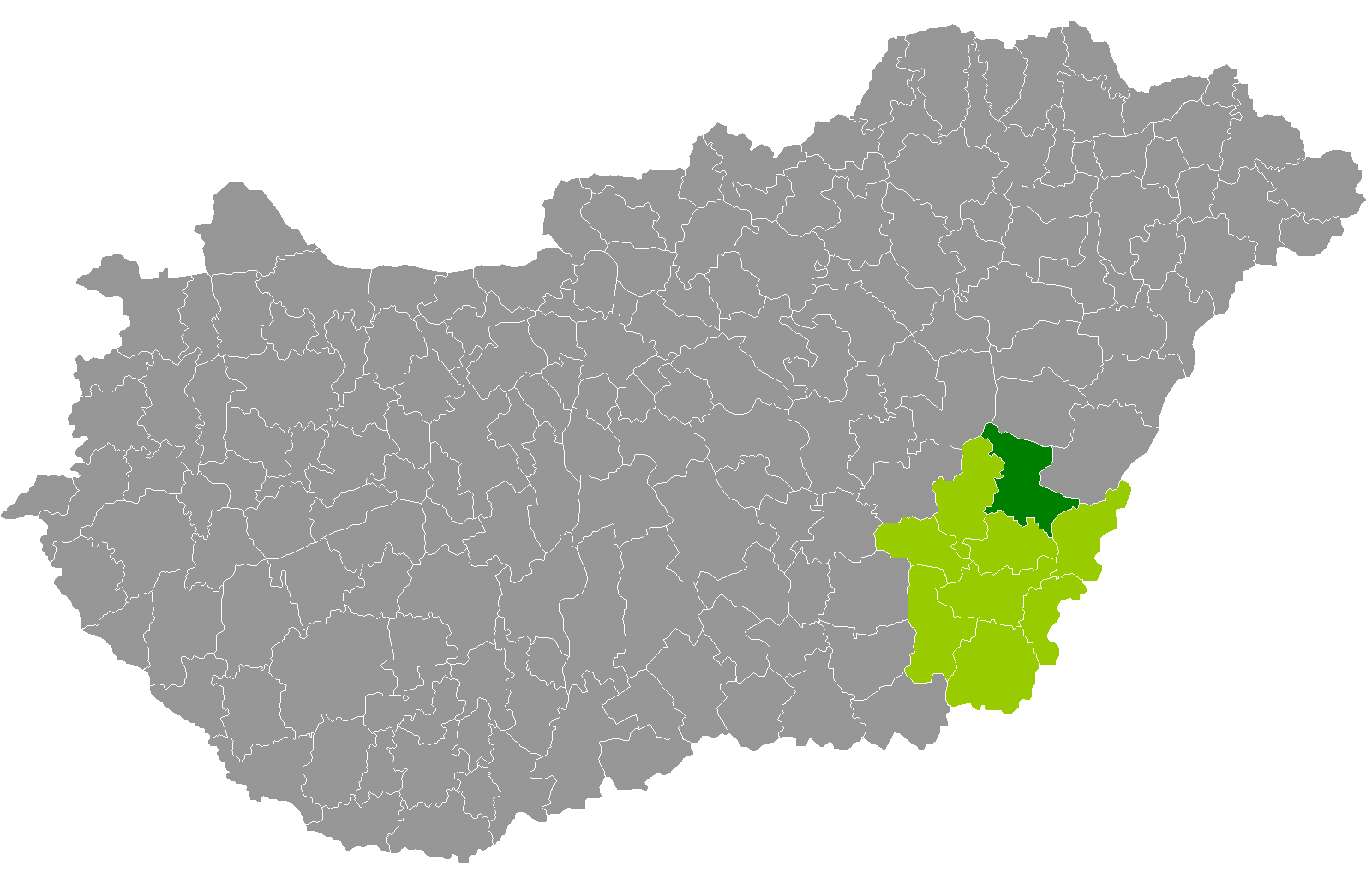
- Szeghalom District within Hungary and Békés County.
- Coordinates: 47.02°N 21.17°E
- Country: Hungary
- County: Békés
- District seat: Szeghalom

Area
  - Total: 714.19 km^{2} (275.75 sq mi)
  - Rank: 3rd in Békés

Population (2011 census)
  - Total: 29,709
  - Rank: 6th in Békés
  - Density: 42/km^{2} (110/sq mi)

Szeghalom (Hungarian: Szeghalmi járás) is a district in northern part of Békés County. Szeghalom is also the name of the town where the district seat is found. The district is located in the Southern Great Plain Statistical Region.

== Geography ==
Szeghalom District borders with Püspökladány District (Hajdú-Bihar County) to the north, Berettyóújfalu District (Hajdú-Bihar County) and Sarkad District to the east, Békés District to the south, Gyomaendrőd District and Karcag District (Jász-Nagykun-Szolnok County) to the west. The number of the inhabited places in Szeghalom District is 7.

== Municipalities ==
The district has 4 towns and 3 villages. (ordered by population, as of 1 January 2012)

- Bucsa (2,055)
- **Füzesgyarmat** (5,665)
- Kertészsziget (379)
- **Körösladány** (4,582)
- Körösújfalu (537)
- **Szeghalom** (9,115) – district seat
- **Vésztő** (6,680)

The bolded municipalities are cities.

== Demographics ==
Religion in Szeghalom District (2011 census)
1. Calvinism (25.7%)
2. Lutheranism (0.30%)
3. Catholic Church (7.80%)
4. Greek Catholicism (0.10%)
5. Other religions (1.20%)
6. Non-religious (43.3%)
7. Atheists (0.80%)
8. Undeclared (20.8%)

In 2011, it had a population of 29,709 and the population density was 42/km².

Year	County population	Change
2011	29,709	n/a

=== Ethnicity ===
Besides the Hungarian majority, the main minorities are the Roma (approx. 1,200) and German (100).

Total population (2011 census): 29,709
Ethnic groups (2011 census): Identified themselves: 26,835 persons:

- Hungarians: 25,436 (94.79%)
- Gypsies: 1,136 (4.23%)
- Others and indefinable: 263 (0.98%)

Approx. 3,000 persons in Szeghalom District did not declare their ethnic group at the 2011 census.

=== Religion ===
Religious adherence in the county according to 2011 census:

- Reformed – 7,620;
- Catholic – 2,354 (Roman Catholic – 2,325; Greek Catholic – 29);
- Evangelical – 93;
- other religions – 348;
- Non-religious – 12,865;
- Atheism – 244;
- Undeclared – 6,185.

== Gallery ==
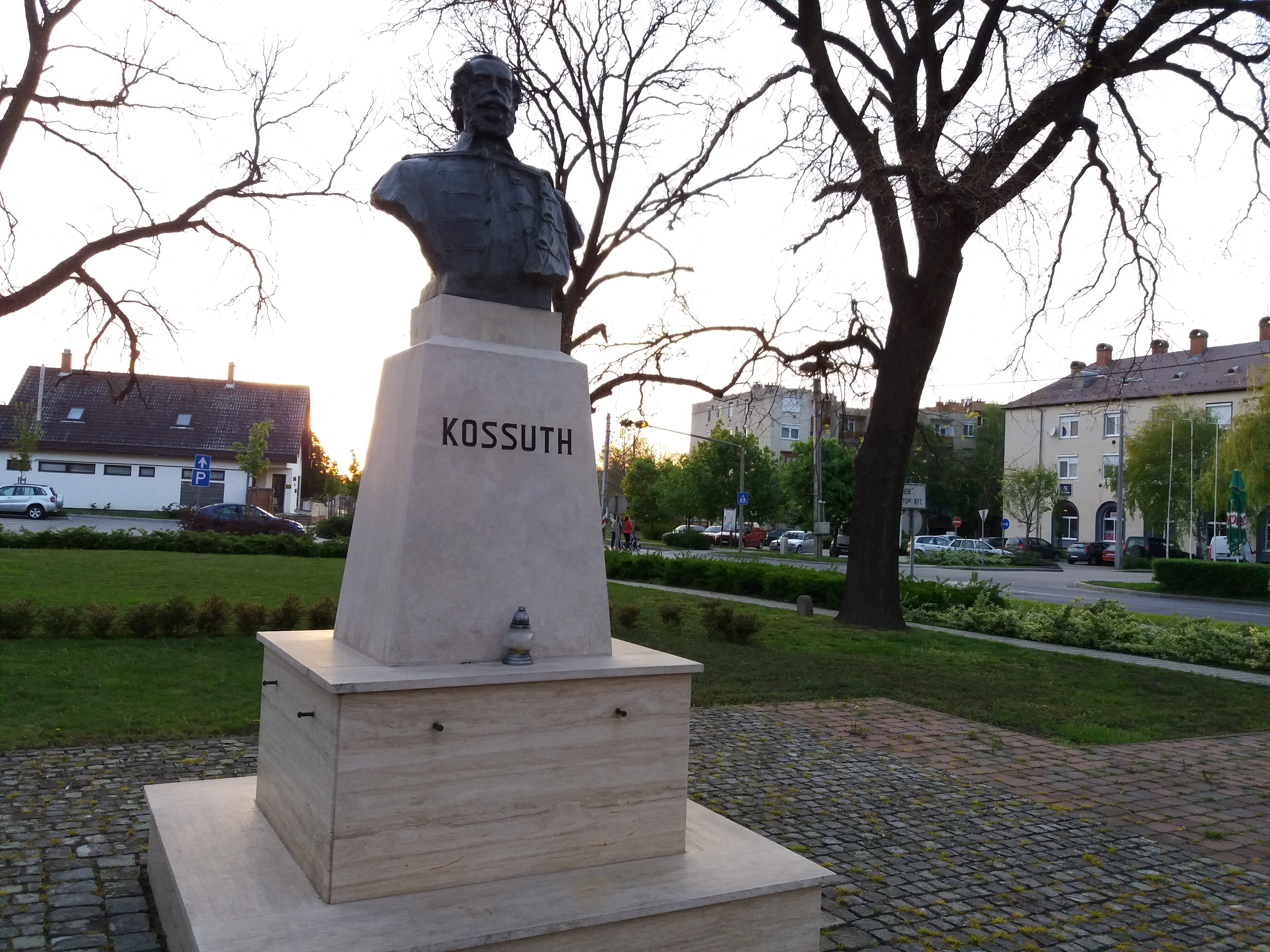
Szeghalom, the district seat

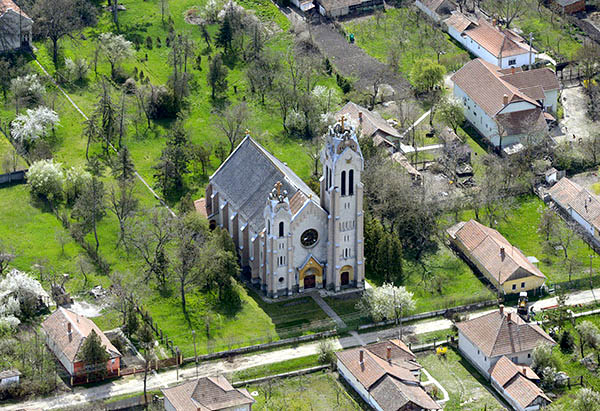
Aerial view of Bucsa

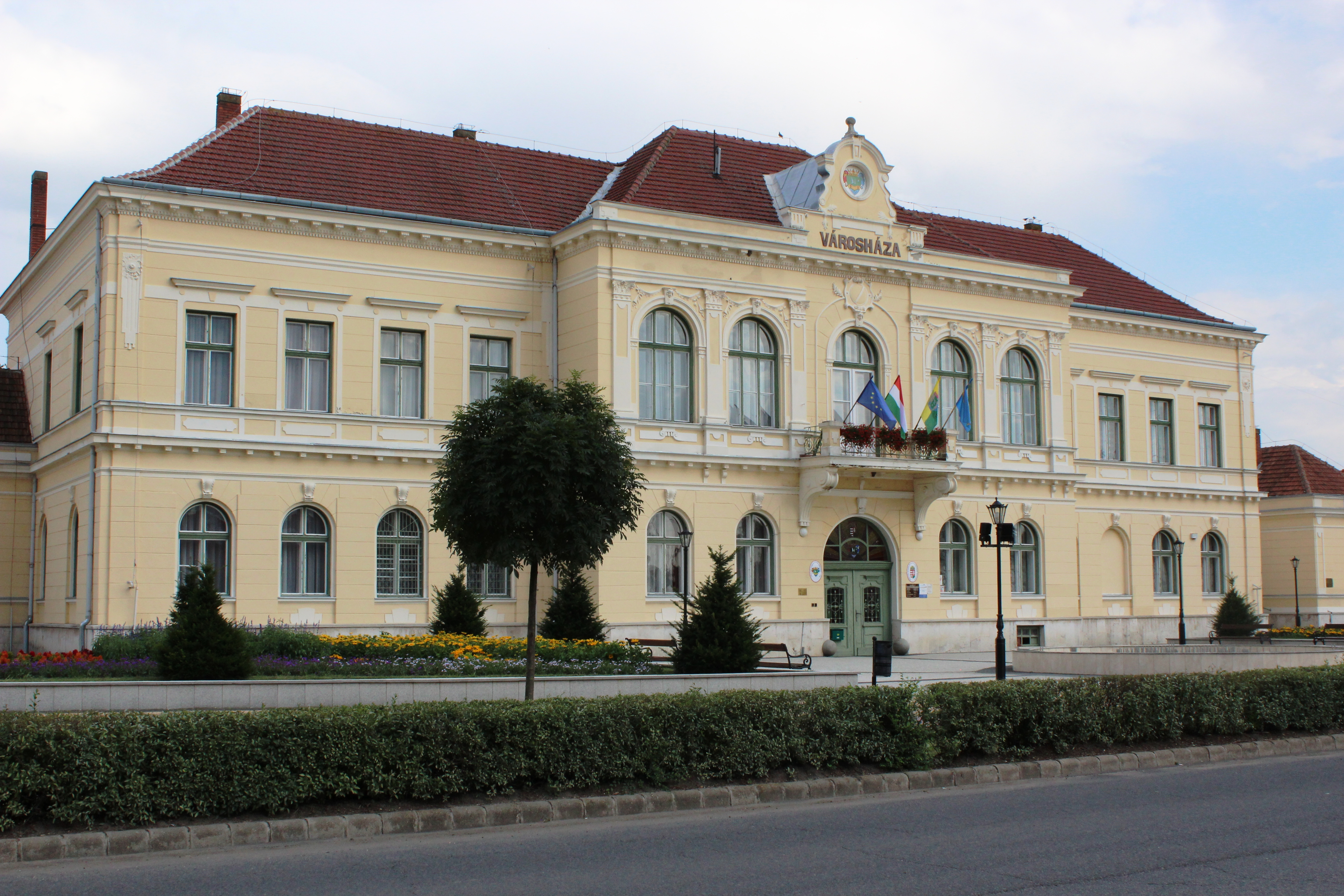
Vésztő, Town Hall

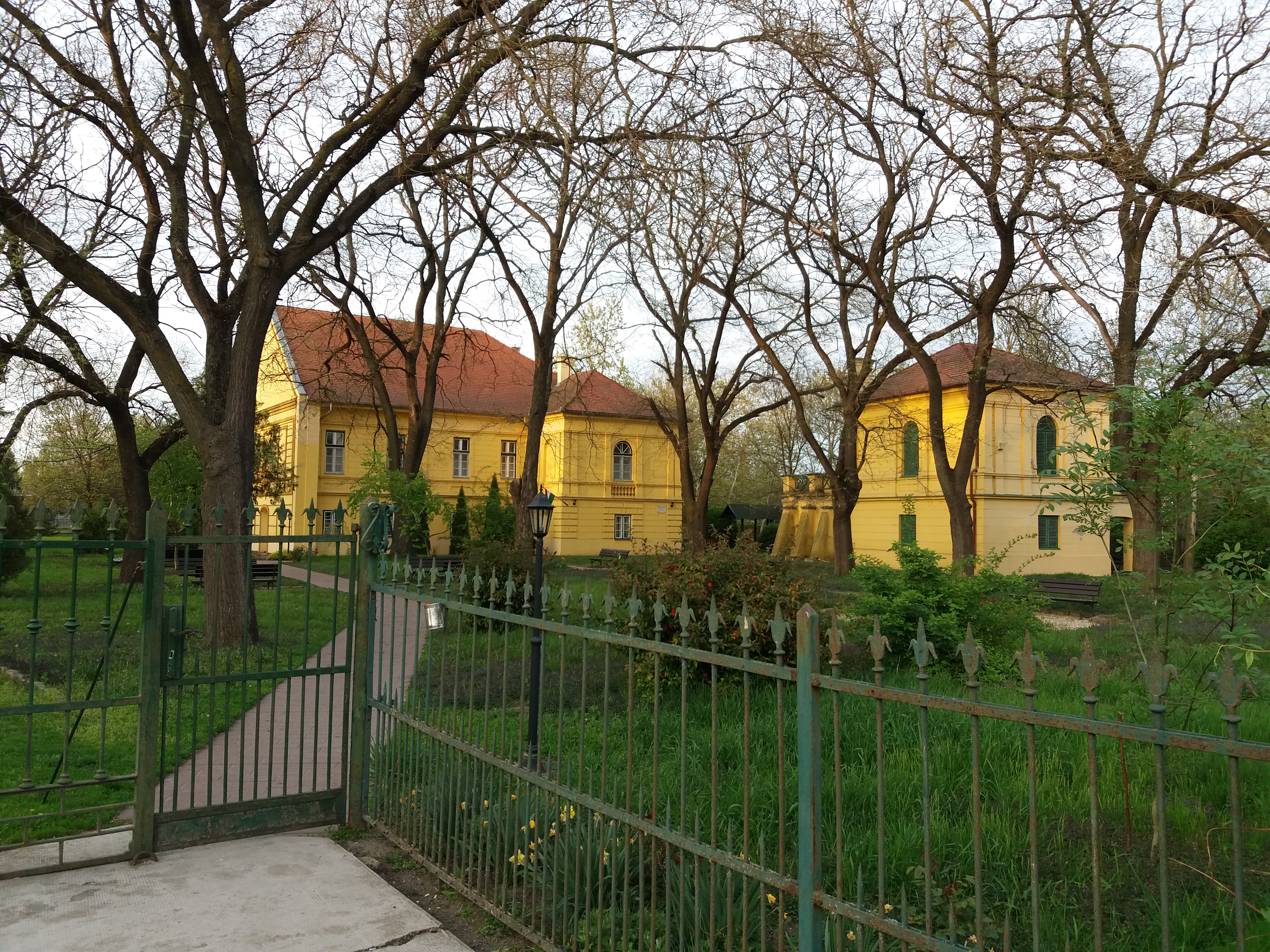
Kárász Mansion in Szeghalom

== See also ==
- List of cities and towns of Hungary
