= János Pásztor (sculptor) =

Hungarian sculptor (1881–1945)

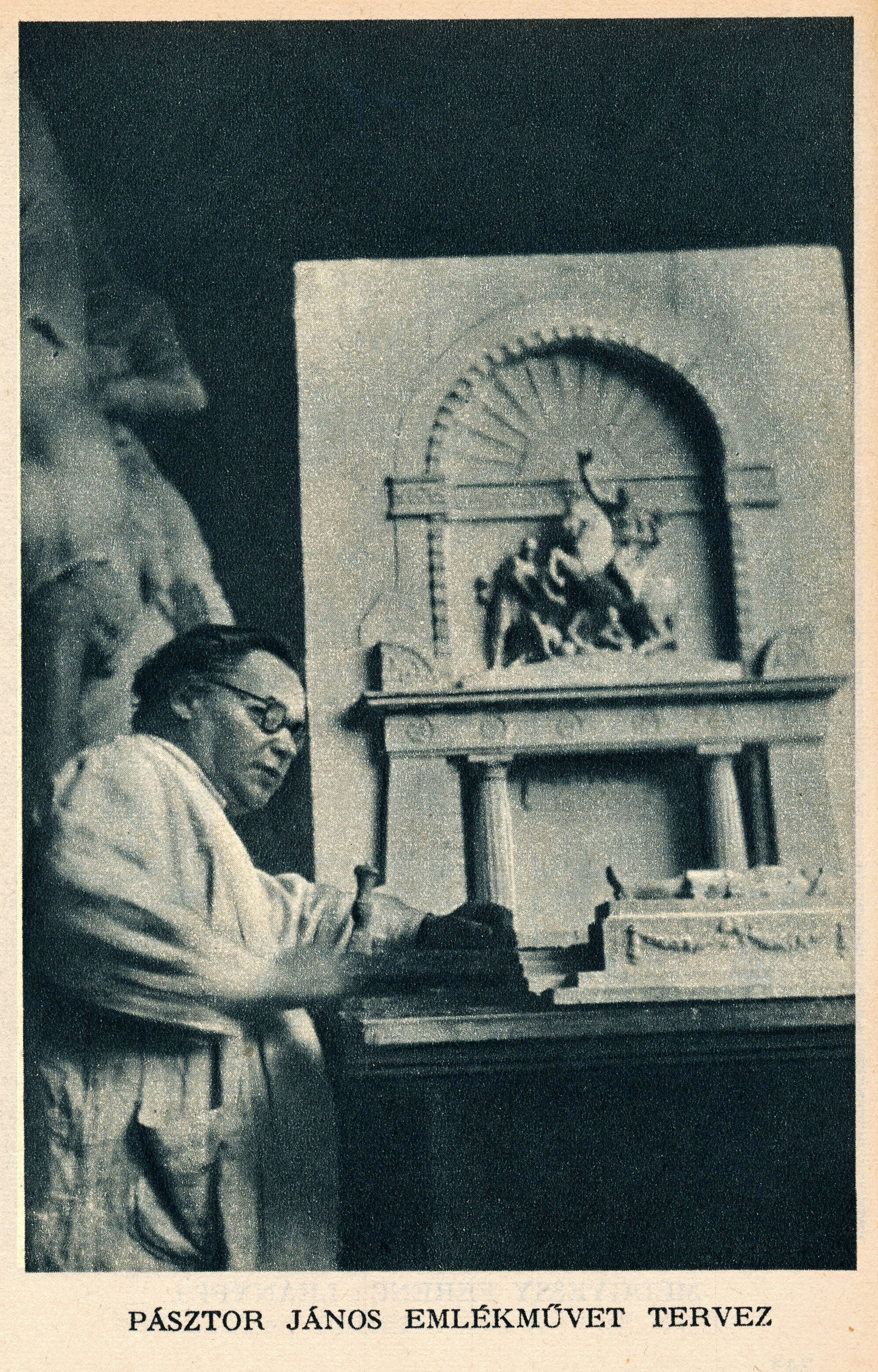
- János Pásztor in 1938
- Born: 1881; Gyoma, Austria-Hungary
- Died: 1945 (aged 63–64); Budapest, Hungary
- Education: School of Arts and Crafts
- Known for: Academic sculptor
- Awards: Grand Prix of the World's Fair in Barcelona

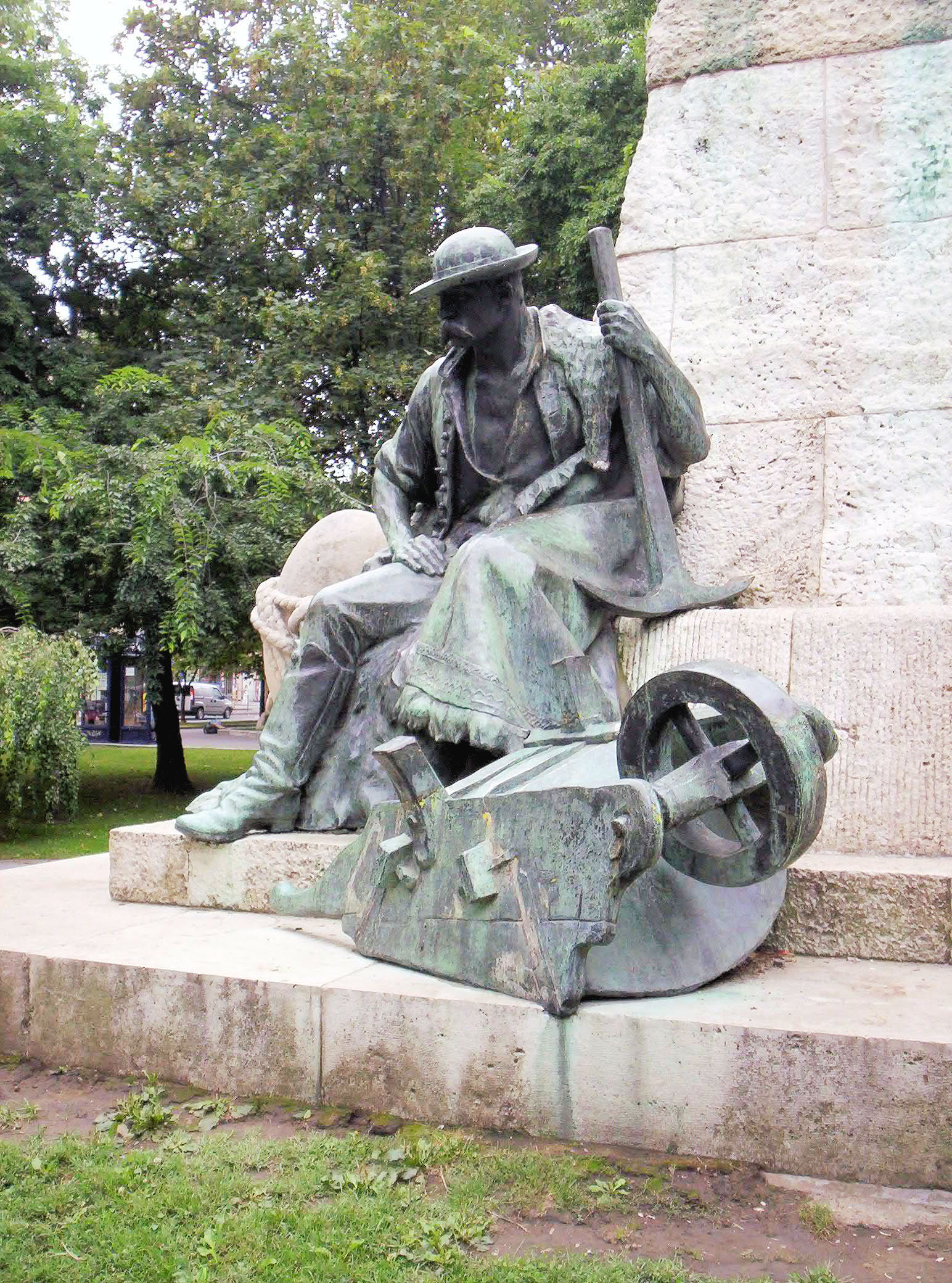
The digger in Szeged

János Pásztor (1881–1945) was a renowned Hungarian academic sculptor in the first decades of the 20th century.

== Early life ==
Pásztor learned sculptural arts in the School of Arts and Crafts (Iparművészeti Iskola, today Moholy-Nagy University of Art and Design) in Budapest. He was a pupil of Lajos Mátrai.

His first works were the side figures of the Pál Vásárhelyi Monument in Szeged. In 1903 he got a fellowship in Paris. In 1905 Pásztor settled down in Hódmezővásárhely but five years later he moved to Budapest.

He became a renowned artist with popular exhibitions in 1911, 1918, 1925 and 1930. In 1929 he won the Grand Prix of the World's Fair in Barcelona. He was killed at the end of World War II during the bombardment of Budapest.

Pásztor sculpted small genre statues, female nudes, portraits and funeral monuments. In the 1930s and 1940s he created several important public monuments in Budapest. His most important works-of-art are the Ferenc Kazinczy Memorial in the Castle District of Buda, and the Neo-Classicist equestrian statue of Francis II Rákóczi erected in front of the Hungarian Parliament Building on Lajos Kossuth Square in 1937.

== Gallery ==
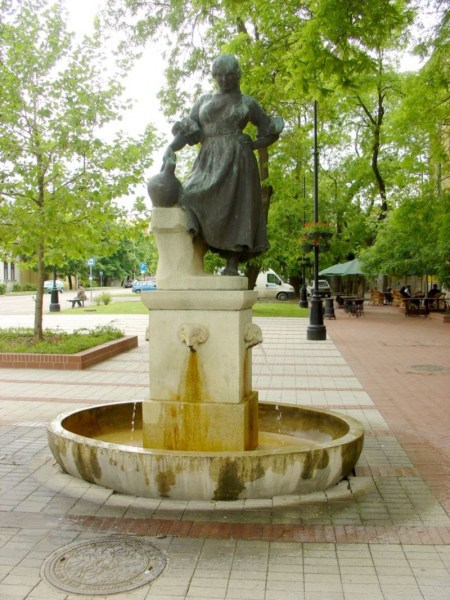
The girl with jug on square Kosssuth in Hódmezővásárhely

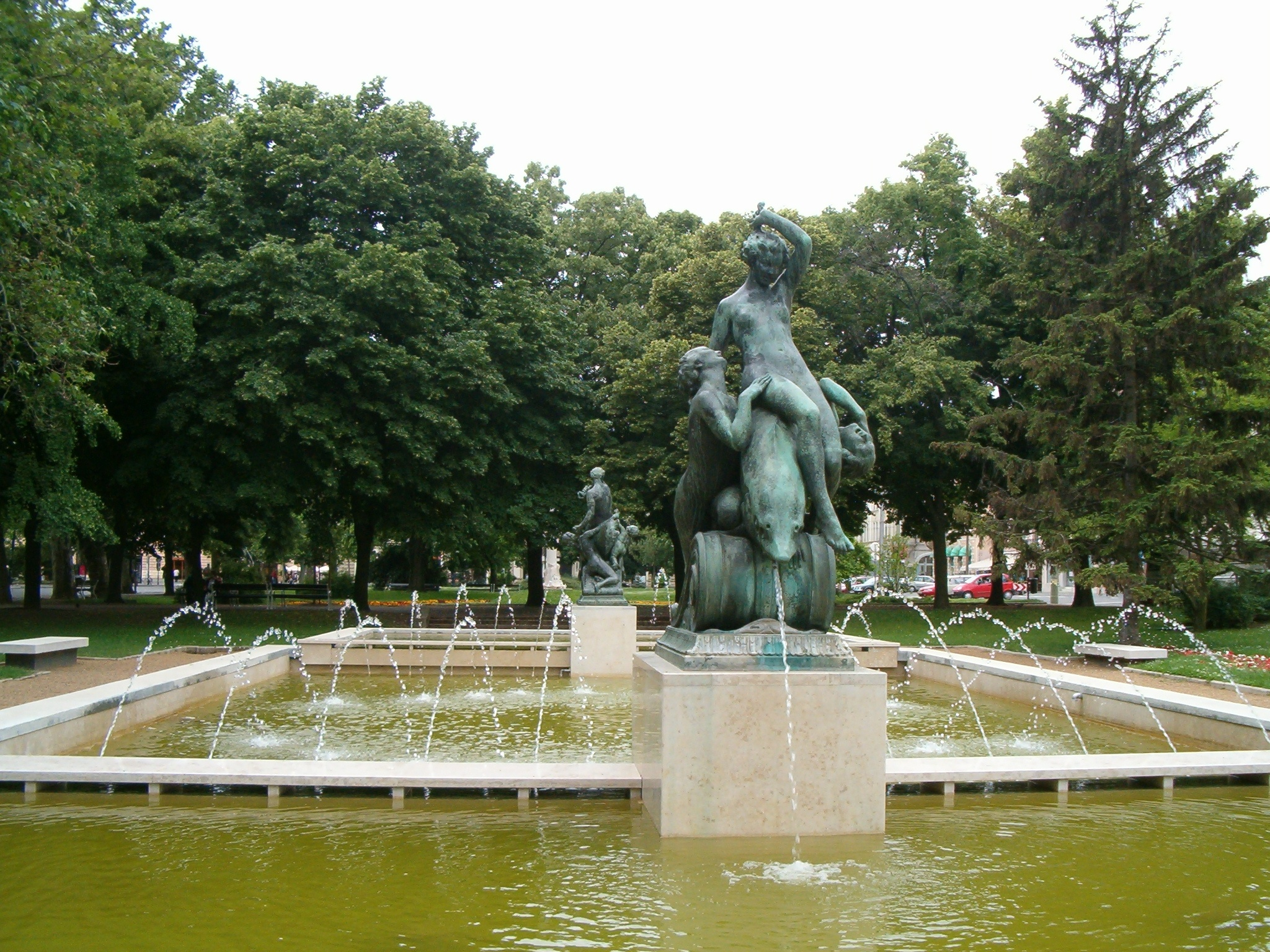
The Blessing and Destroying Tisza fountain group in Szeged

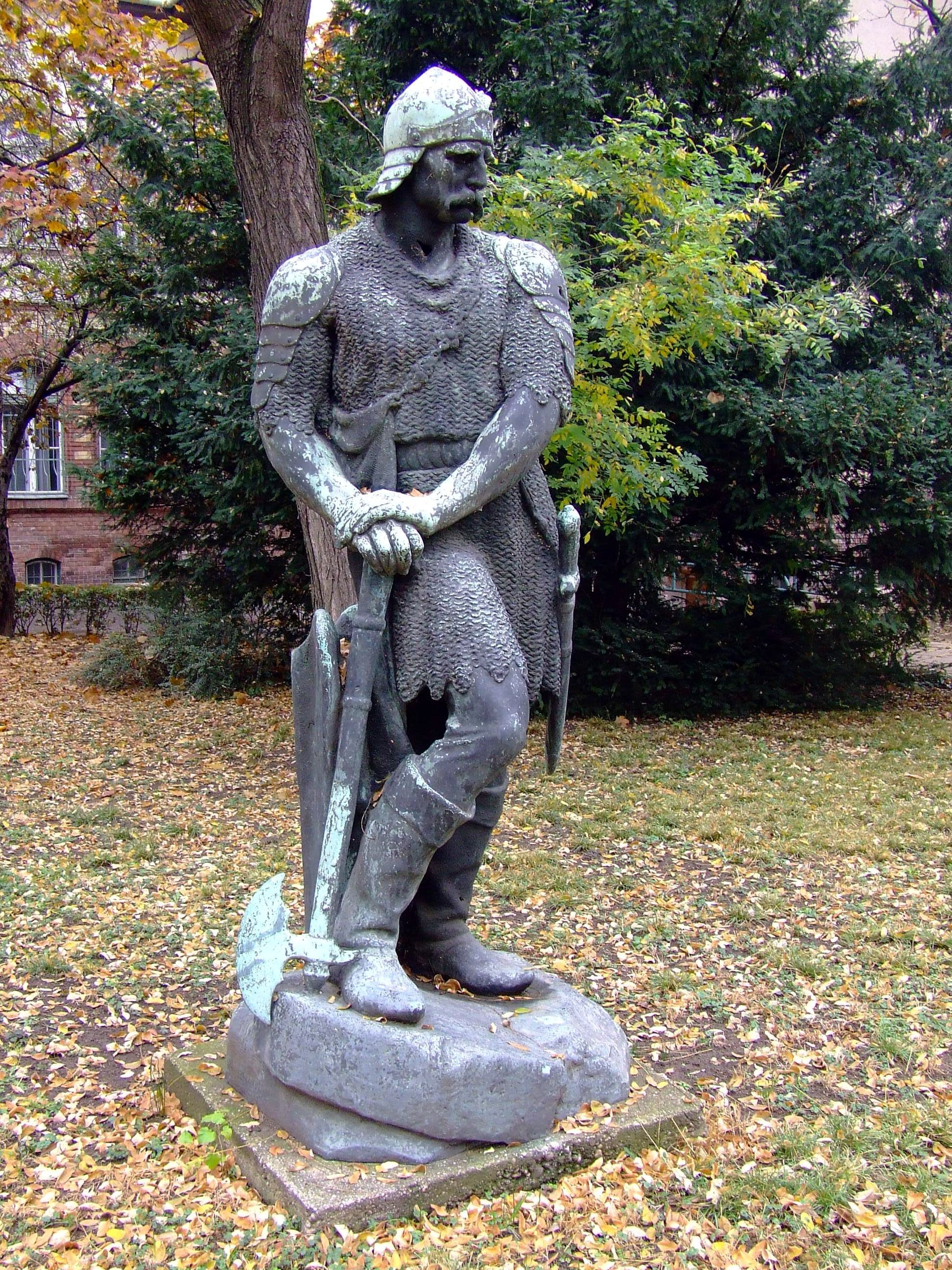
Statue of Pál Kinizsi in Budapest

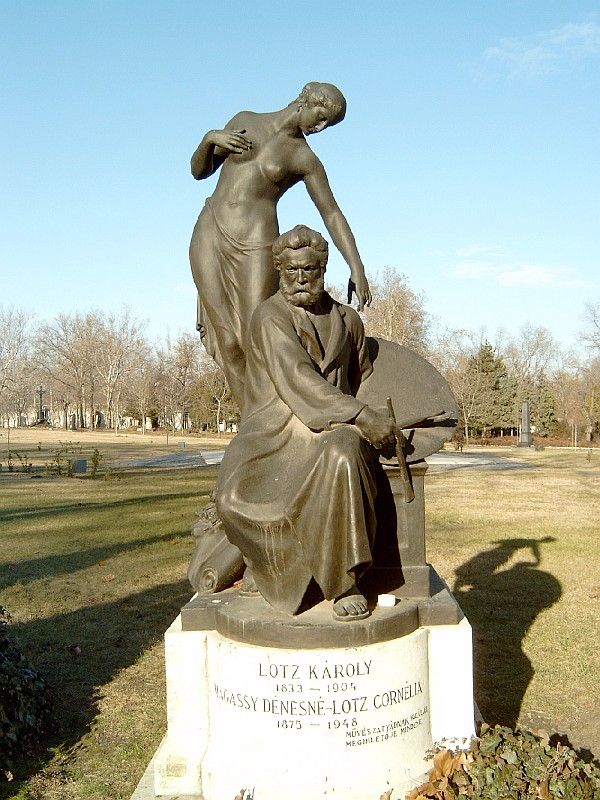
Tomb of Károly Lotz (Kerepesi cemetery in Budapest)

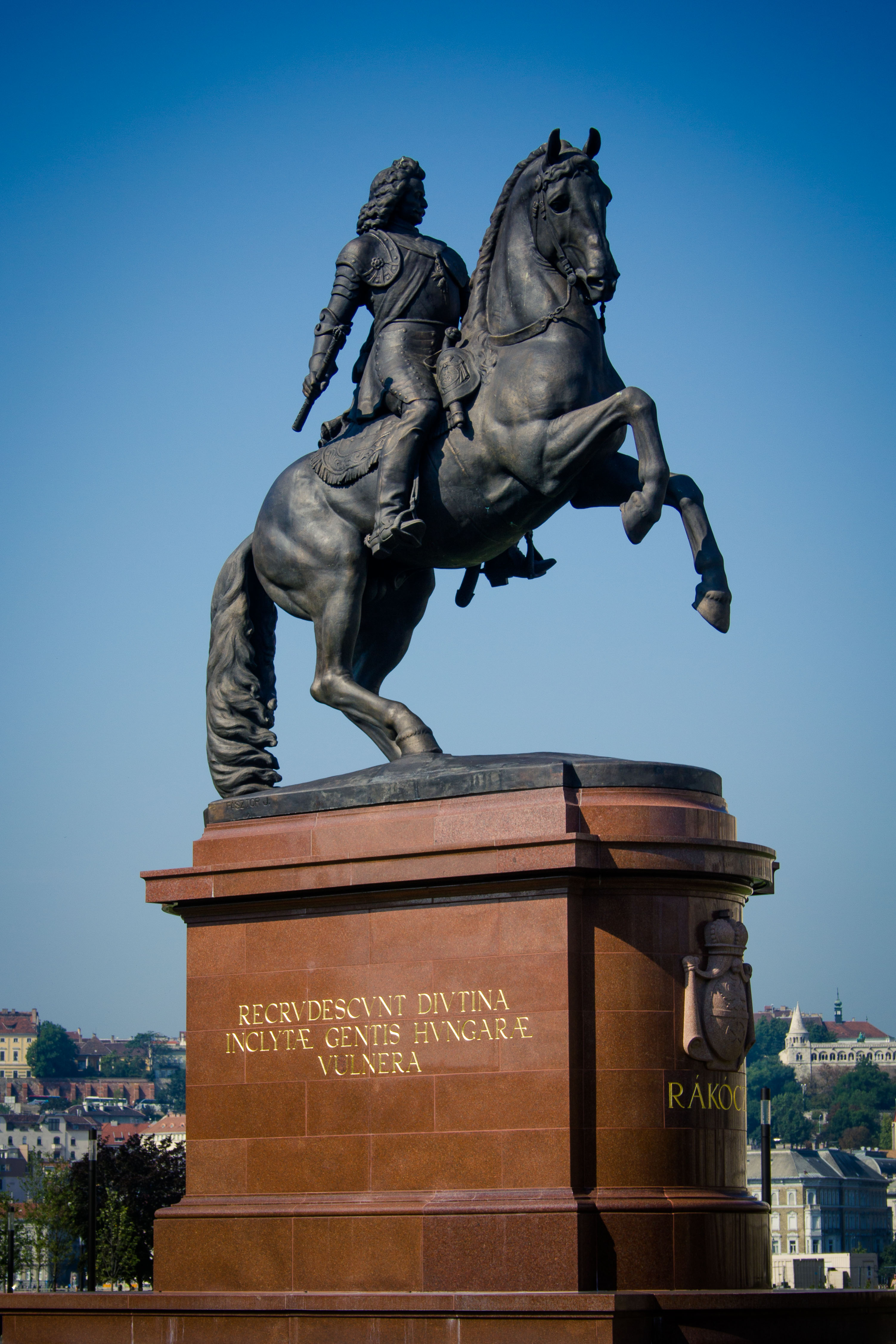
Statue of Francis II Rákóczi outside Hungarian Parliament Building
