= Dévaványa =

- Town
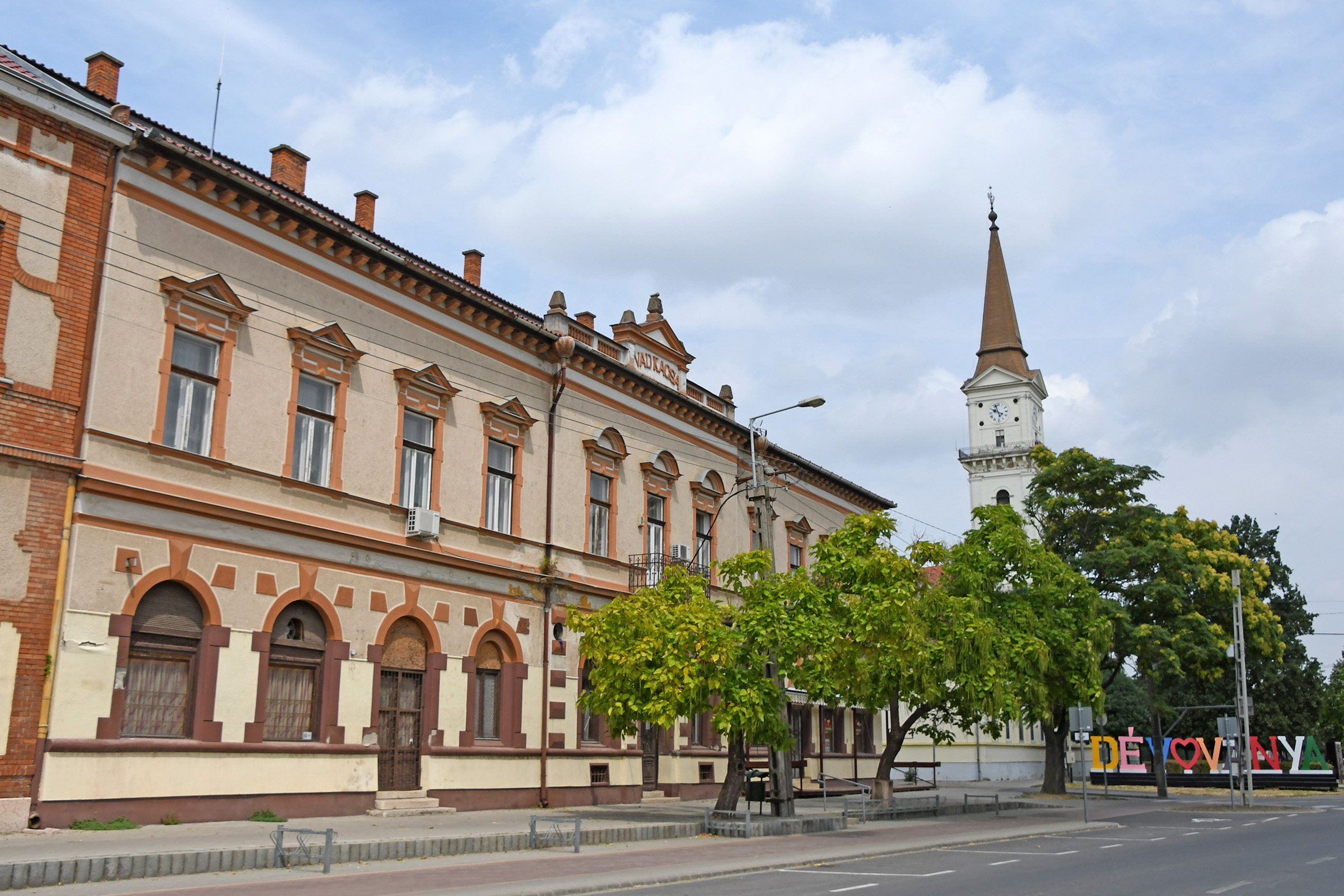
- The northern side of the main street in Dévaványa

- Flag Coat of arms

- Location within Hungary
- Coordinates: 47.030°N 20.959°E
- Country: Hungary
- County: Békés
- District: Gyomaendrőd

Government
  - Mayor: Valánszki Miklós Róbert (Ind.)

Area
  - Total: 216.65 km^{2} (83.65 sq mi)

Population (2024)
  - Total: 6,793
  - Density: 31.35/km^{2} (81.21/sq mi)
- Time zone: UTC+1 (CET)
  - Summer (DST): UTC+2 (CEST)
- Postal code: 5510
- Area code: (+36) 66
- Website: www.devavanya.hu

Dévaványa is a town in northern Békés county, in the Southern Great Plain region of Hungary.

== Geography ==
It covers an area of 216.65 km² and has a population of 6,793 people (2024).

== History ==
The town first appeared in writing in the 1330s, first under the name "Jana" and then under the name "Vana". In 1523, Louis II of Hungary elevated the town's status to that of a market town. In 1523, the town can first be spotted on maps of Hungary under the name "Wama". In 1693, an army of Tatars decimated the town, causing the majority of its inhabitants to flee to the town of Tiszabábolna in Borsod County.

== Twin towns – sister cities ==
Dévaványa is twinned with:

- Cristuru Secuiesc, Romania (1994)
