= Vésztő =

- Town
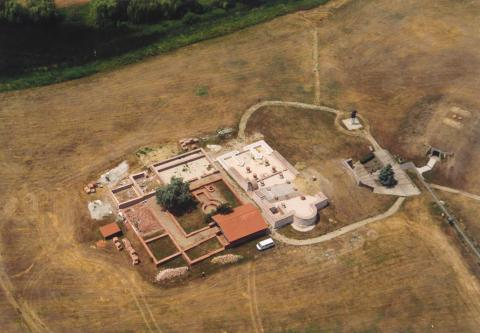
- Vésztő, Csolt Monastery

- Flag Coat of arms

- Location within Hungary
- Coordinates: 46.924°N 21.262°E
- Country: Hungary
- County: Békés
- District: Szeghalom

Area
  - Total: 125.76 km^{2} (48.56 sq mi)

Population (2015)
  - Total: 6,855
  - Density: 54.5/km^{2} (141/sq mi)
- Time zone: UTC+1 (CET)
  - Summer (DST): UTC+2 (CEST)
- Postal code: 5530
- Area code: (+36) 66
- Website: www.veszto.hu

Vésztő is a town in Békés county, in the Southern Great Plain region of south-east Hungary.

== Geography ==
It covers an area of 125.76 km^{2} (48.56 sq mi) and has a population of 6,855 people (2015). The town is situated in the Tisza plain.

== History ==
North of the modern town, there is the archaeological site of a Neolithic tell. At its top, the medieval Csolt monastery is located.

=== Jewish community ===
In the 19th century, a Jewish community lived in the village. Most of them worked as merchants and later became industrialists. Their non-Jewish neighbors trusted them and some Jews were even elected to the city council and were also active in the town's culture. Relationships with their neighbors were generally good. The community had a Jewish school. The community synagogue was built in 1934 after the previous synagogue was destroyed in a flood. In 1920, 181 Jews lived in the community.

In May 1944, after the German army entered Hungary, all the Jews were concentrated in a ghetto that included only two buildings in the city center, which were declared ghettos.

On June 21, all Jews were sent to the Szolnok Ghetto, where author Ida Lang was murdered as a result of torture. Most of the Jews were transferred from Szolnok to the Auschwitz extermination camp. After the war, 34 survivors returned to the city, erected a monument in memory of the murdered, and tried to rehabilitate the community without success.

== Twin towns – sister cities ==
Vésztő is twinned with:

- Dumbrava, Romania (1991)
- Brăduț, Romania (1991)
- Vârghiș, Romania (1991)

== Notable residents ==
- László Hajdu (born 1947), Hungarian economist and politician
- Menyhért Lakatos (1926—2007), Hungarian Romani writer
