= Füzesgyarmat =

- Town
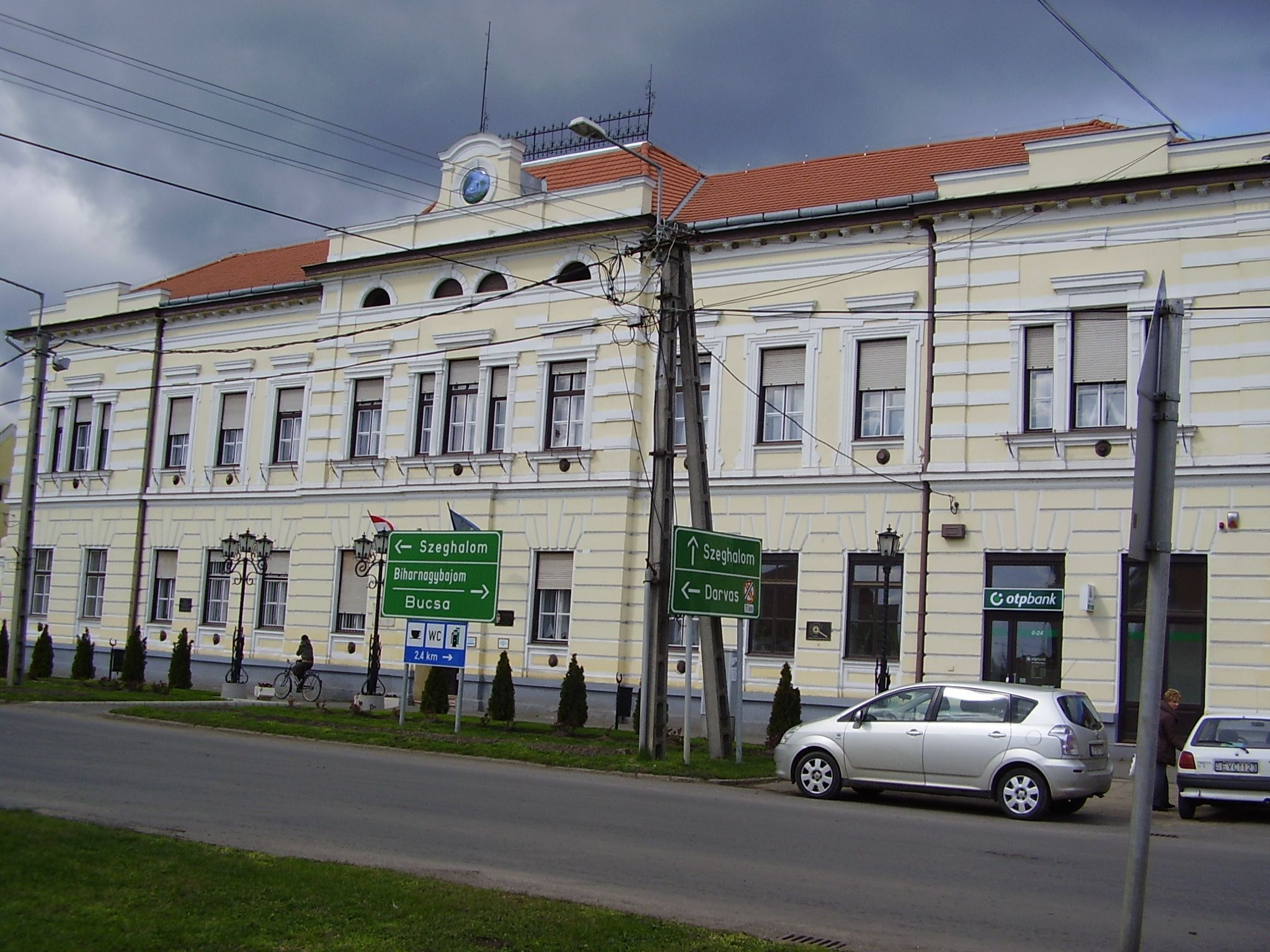
- Town hall

- Coat of arms

- Location within Hungary
- Coordinates: 47.106°N 21.212°E
- Country: Hungary
- County: Békés
- District: Szeghalom

Area
  - Total: 127.41 km^{2} (49.19 sq mi)

Population (2015)
  - Total: 5,774
  - Density: 45/km^{2} (120/sq mi)
- Time zone: UTC+1 (CET)
  - Summer (DST): UTC+2 (CEST)
- Postal code: 5525
- Area code: (+36) 66
- Website: www.fuzesgyarmat.hu

Füzesgyarmat (Hungarian pronunciation: [ˈfyzɛʒɟɒrmɒt]) is a town in Békés county, in the Southern Great Plain region of south-east Hungary.

== History ==
=== Jewish community ===
A Jewish community lived in the village from the beginning of the 19th century until it was destroyed by the Nazis during the Holocaust. In 1880, there were 171 Jews in the place and by 1930 already 230 lived there. A synagogue was built in 1929 and it exists to this day and serves as a school.

== Geography ==
It covers an area of 127.41 km^{2} (49.19 sq mi) and has a population of 5,774 people (2014).

== Sport ==
- Füzesgyarmati SK, association football club

== Twin towns – sister cities ==
Füzesgyarmat is twinned with:

- Ojdula, Romania
- Zimandu Nou, Romania
