= Szeghalom =

- Town
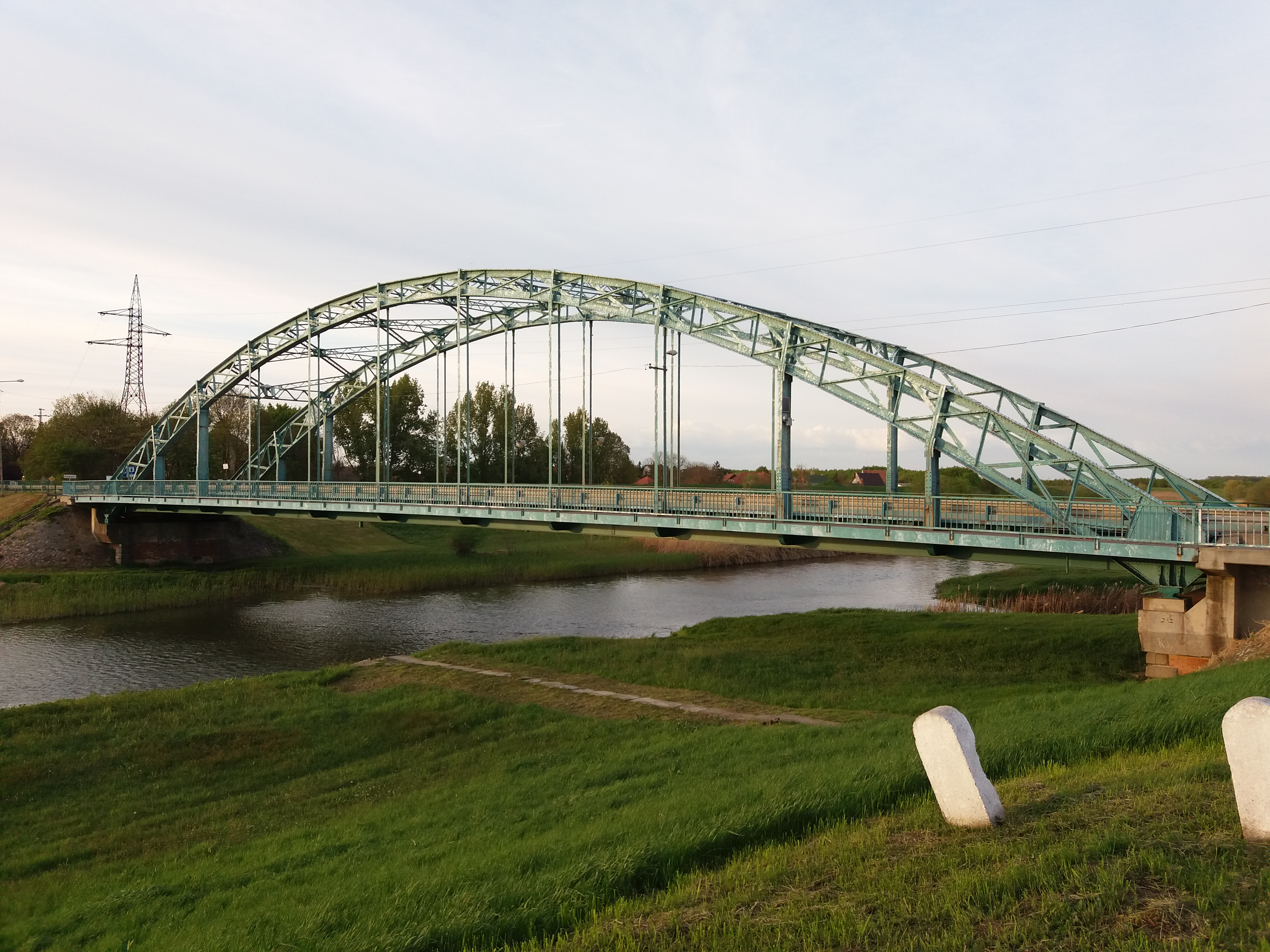
- Berettyó-bridge

- Flag Coat of arms

- Location within Hungary
- Coordinates: 47°1′38″N 21°9′58″E
- Country: Hungary
- County: Békés
- District: Szeghalom

Area
  - Total: 217.13 km^{2} (83.83 sq mi)

Population (2009)
  - Total: 9,465
  - Density: 47/km^{2} (120/sq mi)
- Time zone: UTC+1 (CET)
  - Summer (DST): UTC+2 (CEST)
- Postal code: 5520
- Area code: (+36) 66
- Website: szeghalom.hu

Szeghalom is a town in Békés county, in southeastern Hungary.

== History ==
=== The Jewish Community ===
In the 19th and 20th centuries, a Jewish community with hundreds of members lived in the village.

On March 19, 1944, after the German army entered Hungary, the village Jews were forbidden to leave. In May, the Jews were concentrated in the ghetto established around the synagogue. On June 26, 1944, the village's Jews were transported by train to the Szolnok ghetto, from where they were sent to the Auschwitz extermination camp and murdered in the Holocaust.

== Sport ==
Szeghalom's football club Szeghalmi FC plays the regional 1 league. It has a stadium with a capacity of over 500 people.

== Twin towns – sister cities ==
Szeghalom is twinned with:

- Sâncraiu, Romania
- Staňkov, Czech Republic
- Trasaghis, Italy

== Notable people ==
- Ferenc Szisz, the world's 1st Grand Prix motor racing winner
- Anna Bondár, Hungarian tennis player

== Gallery ==
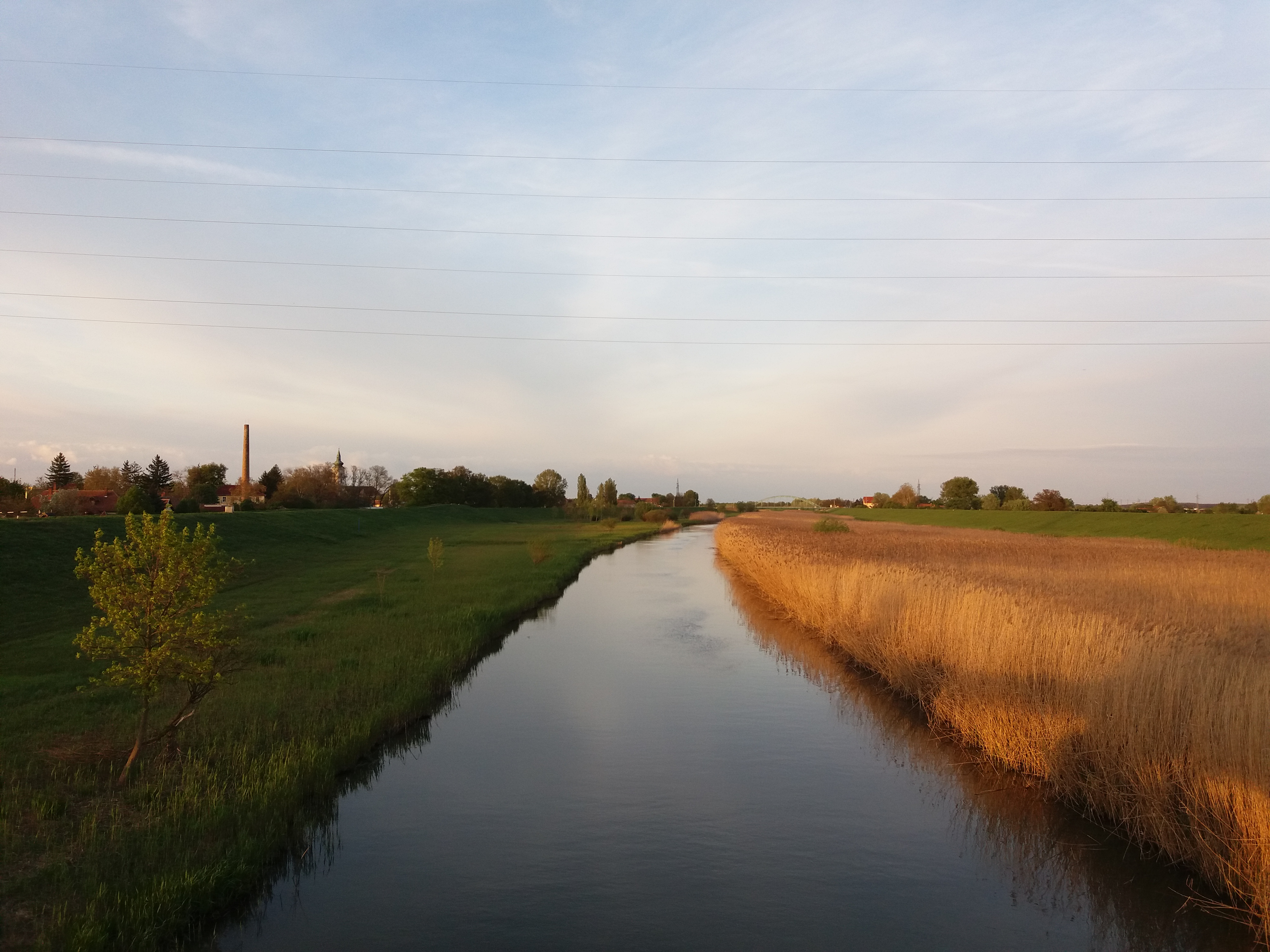
Berettyó river

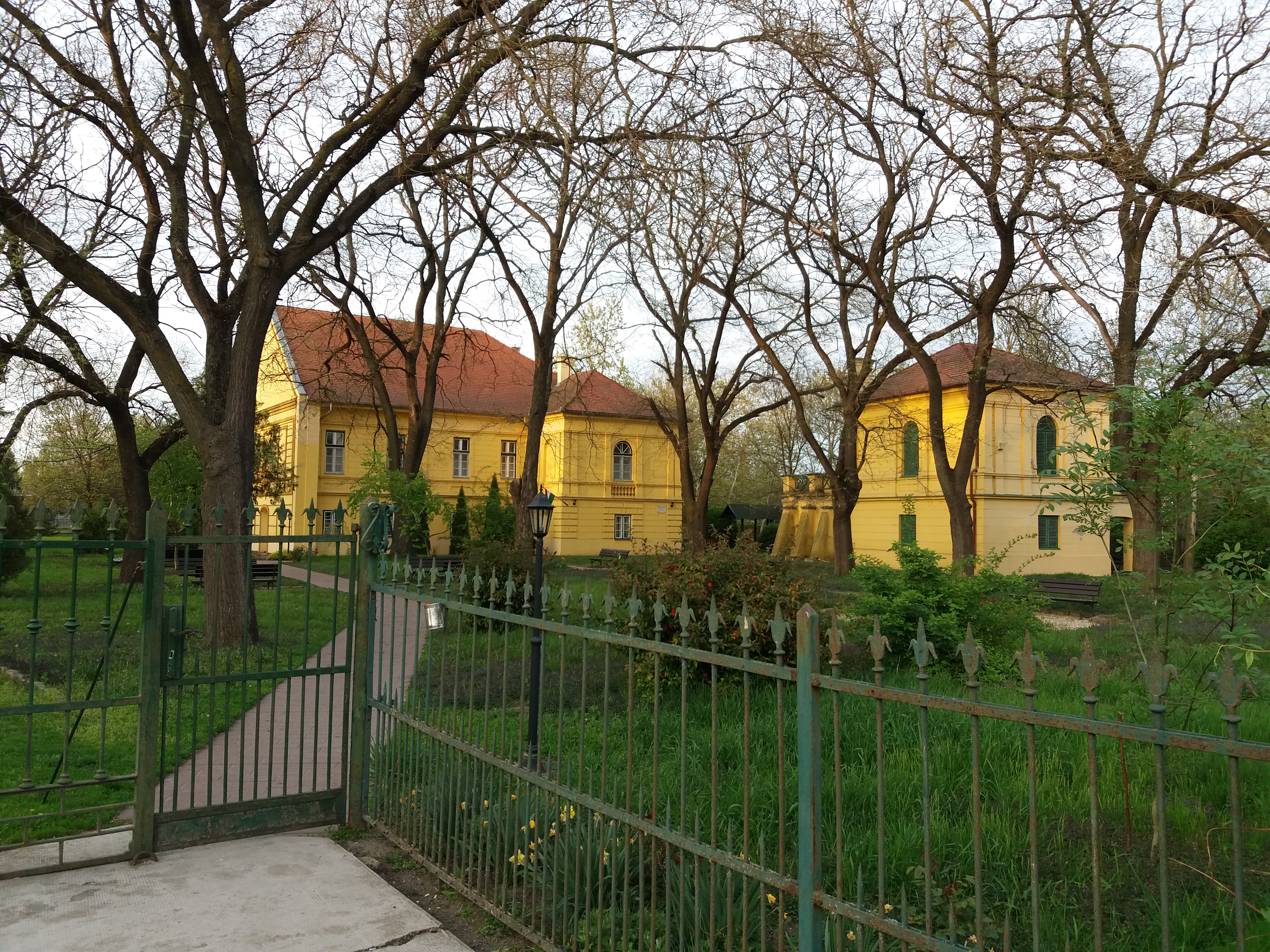
Kárász Mansion

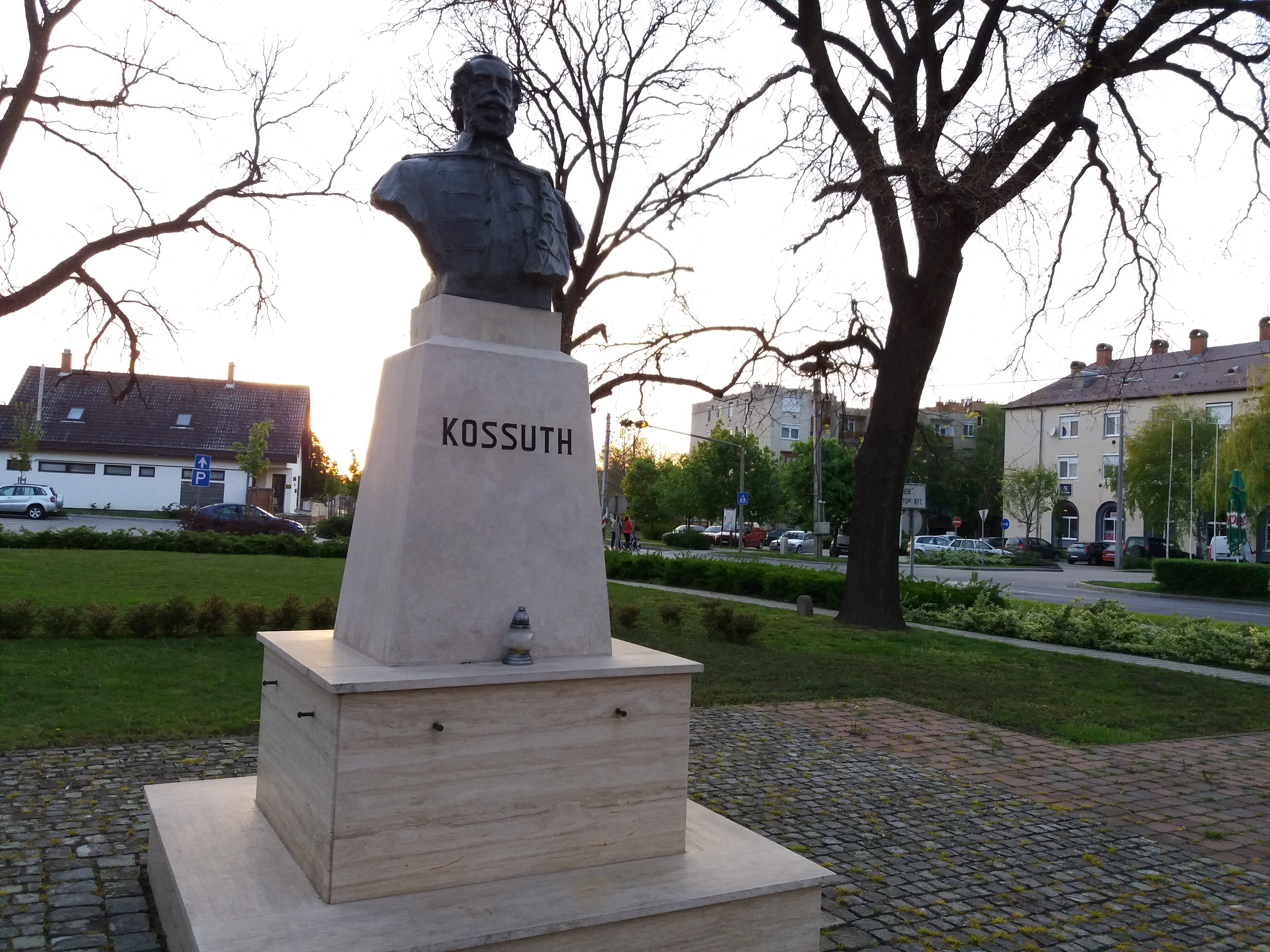
Lajos Kossuth statue

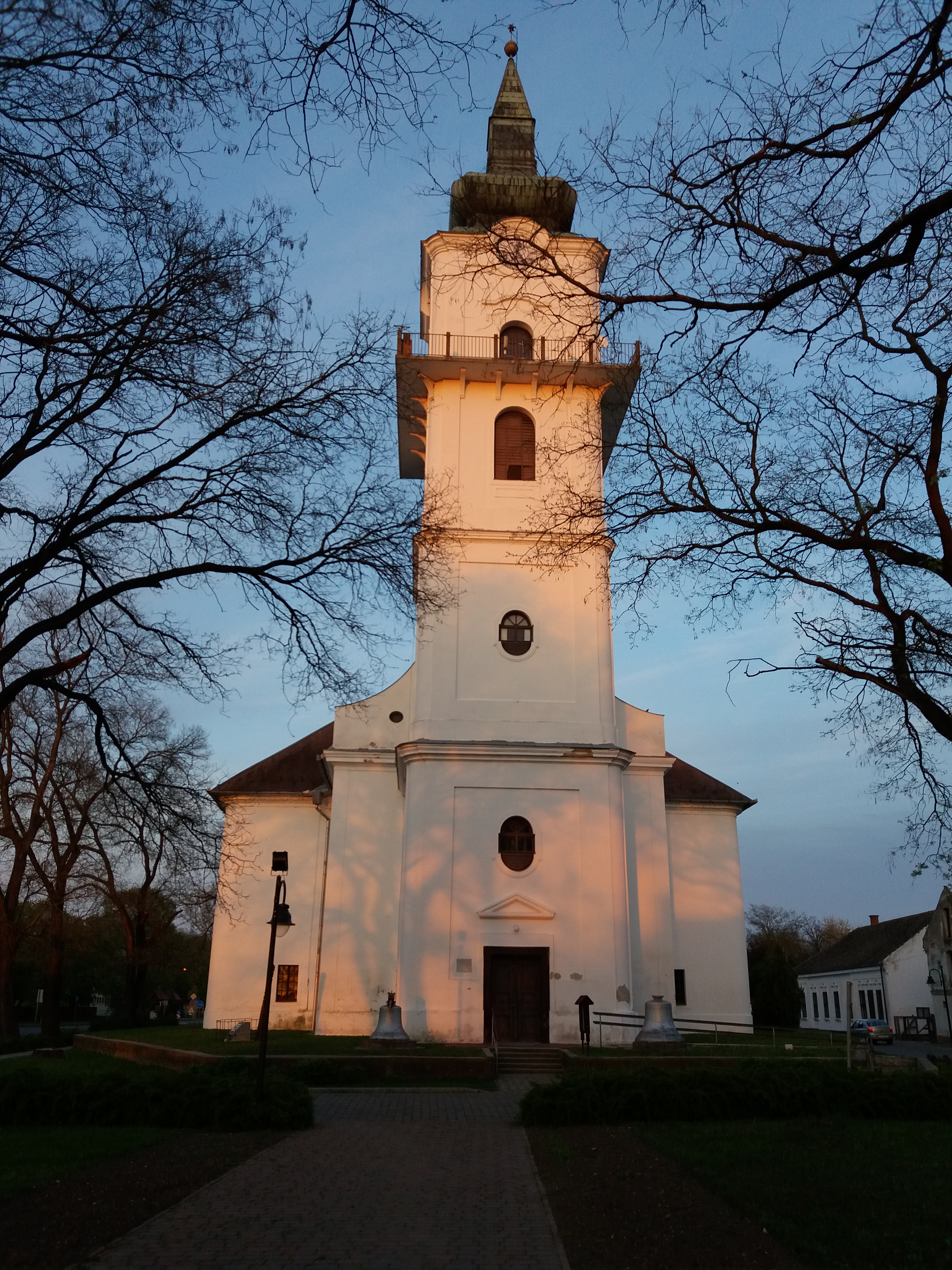
Reformed church on the Kossuth Square

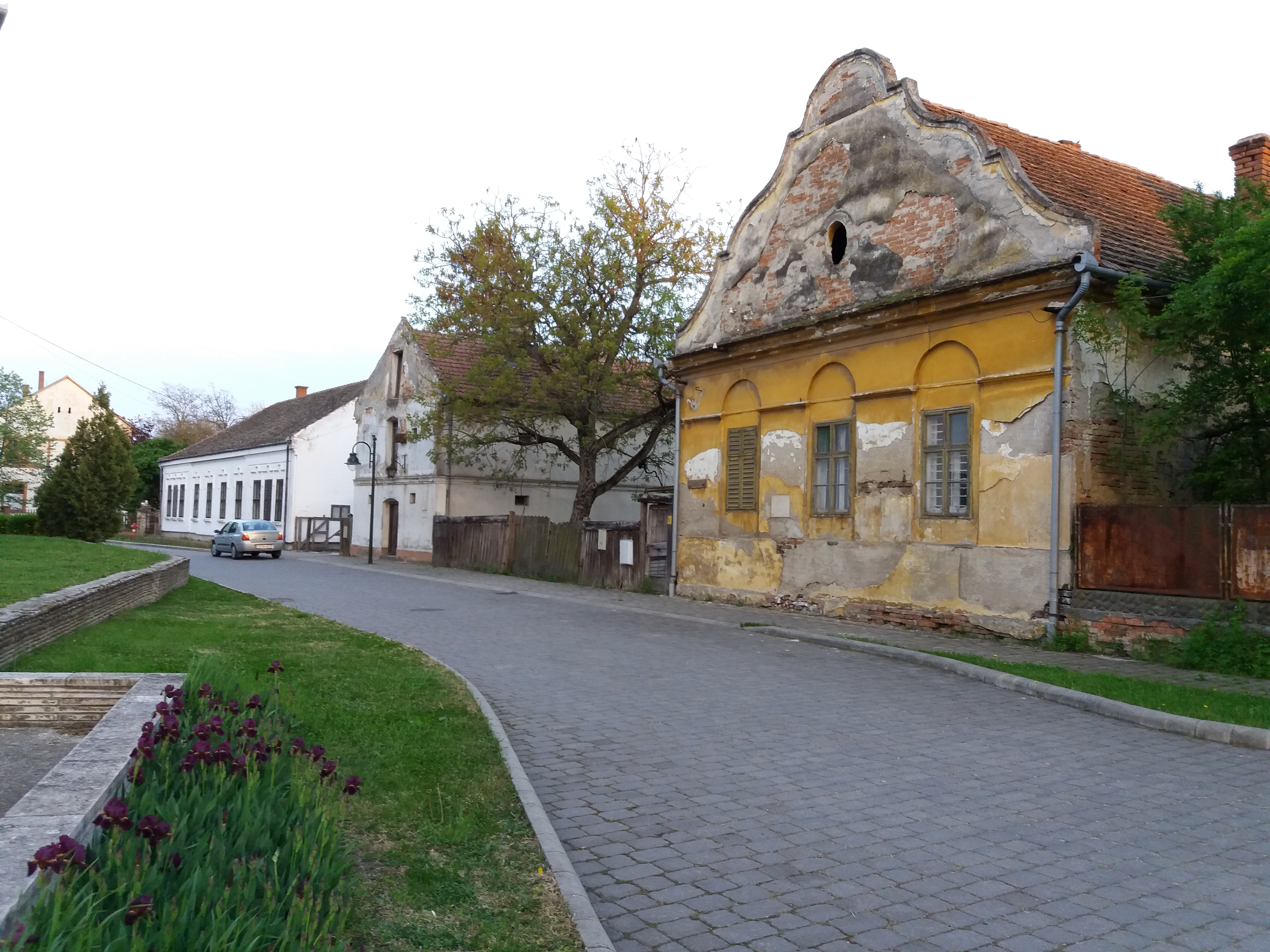
Kossuth Square
