= Gyomaendrőd District =

Gyomaendrőd District Gyomaendrődi járás
- District
- Coat of arms

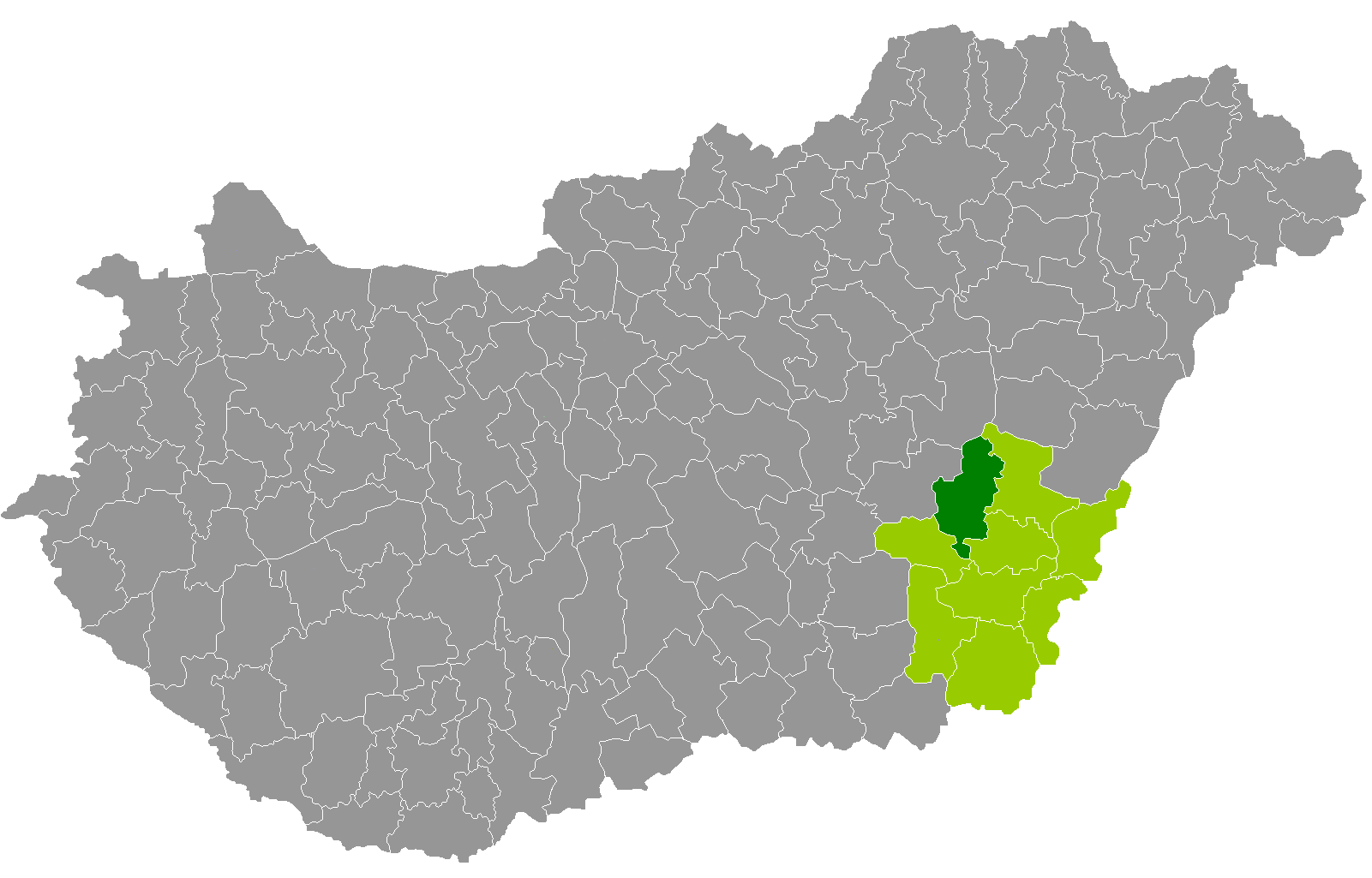
- Gyomaendrőd District within Hungary and Békés County.
- Coordinates: 46.93°N 20.81°E
- Country: Hungary
- County: Békés
- District seat: Gyomaendrőd

Area
  - Total: 686.21 km^{2} (264.95 sq mi)
  - Rank: 4th in Békés

Population (2011 census)
  - Total: 23,943
  - Rank: 8th in Békés
  - Density: 35/km^{2} (91/sq mi)

Gyomaendrőd (Hungarian: Gyomaendrődi járás) is a district in north-western part of Békés County. Gyomaendrőd is also the name of the town where the district seat is found. The district is located in the Southern Great Plain Statistical Region.

== Geography ==
Gyomaendrőd District borders with Karcag District (Jász-Nagykun-Szolnok County) to the north, Szeghalom District and Békés District to the east, Szarvas District to the southwest, Mezőtúr District (Jász-Nagykun-Szolnok County) to the west. The number of the inhabited places in Gyomaendrőd District is 5.

== Municipalities ==
The district has 2 towns and 3 villages. (ordered by population, as of 1 January 2012)

- Csárdaszállás (442)
- **Dévaványa** (7,622)
- Ecsegfalva (1,157)
- **Gyomaendrőd** (13,674) – district seat
- Hunya (634)

The bolded municipalities are cities.

== Demographics ==
Religion in Gyomaendrőd District (2011 census)
1. Catholic Church (20.1%)
2. Calvinism (16.3%)
3. Lutheranism (1.00%)
4. Other religions (1.00%)
5. Non-religious (34.7%)
6. Atheists (0.90%)
7. Undeclared (26.0%)

In 2011, it had a population of 23,943 and the population density was 35/km².

Year	County population	Change
2011	23,943	n/a

=== Ethnicity ===
Besides the Hungarian majority, the main minorities are the Roma (approx. 700) and German (200).

Total population (2011 census): 23,943
Ethnic groups (2011 census): Identified themselves: 21,242 persons:

- Hungarians: 20,172 (94.96%)
- Gypsies: 688 (3.24%)
- Others and indefinable: 382 (1.80%)

Approx. 2,500 persons in Gyomaendrőd District did not declare their ethnic group at the 2011 census.

=== Religion ===
Religious adherence in the county according to 2011 census:

- Catholic – 4,823 (Roman Catholic – 4,806; Greek Catholic – 16);
- Reformed – 3,910;
- Evangelical – 233;
- other religions – 221;
- Non-religious – 8,315;
- Atheism – 224;
- Undeclared – 6,217.

== Gallery ==
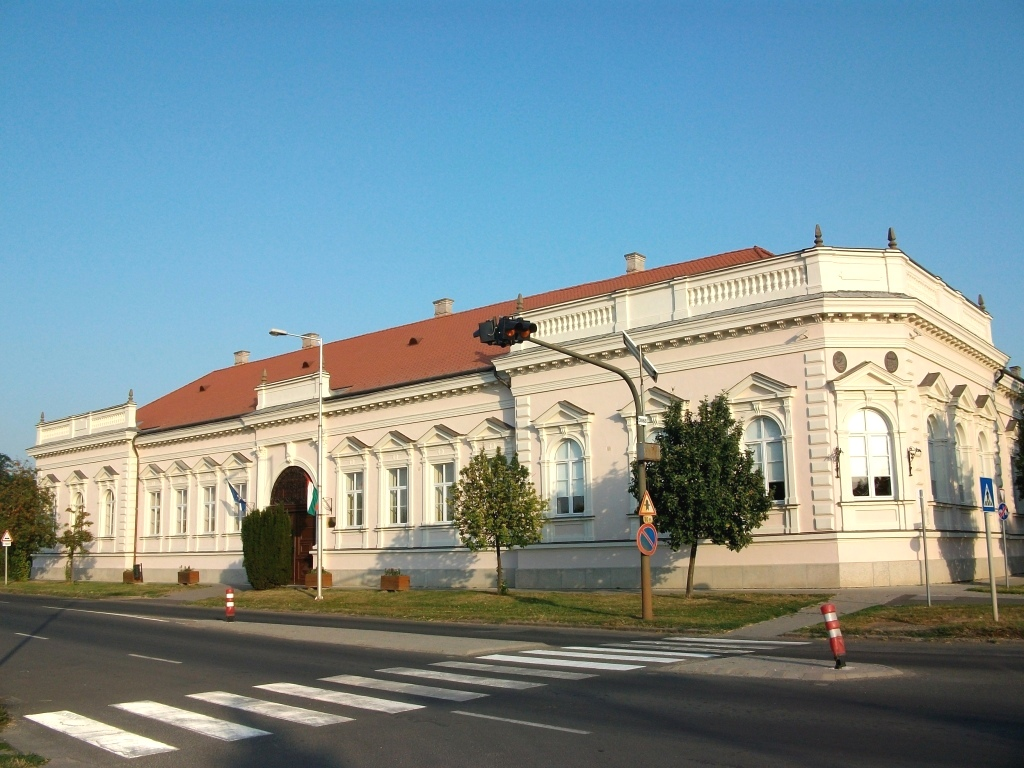
Gyomaendrőd, Town Hall

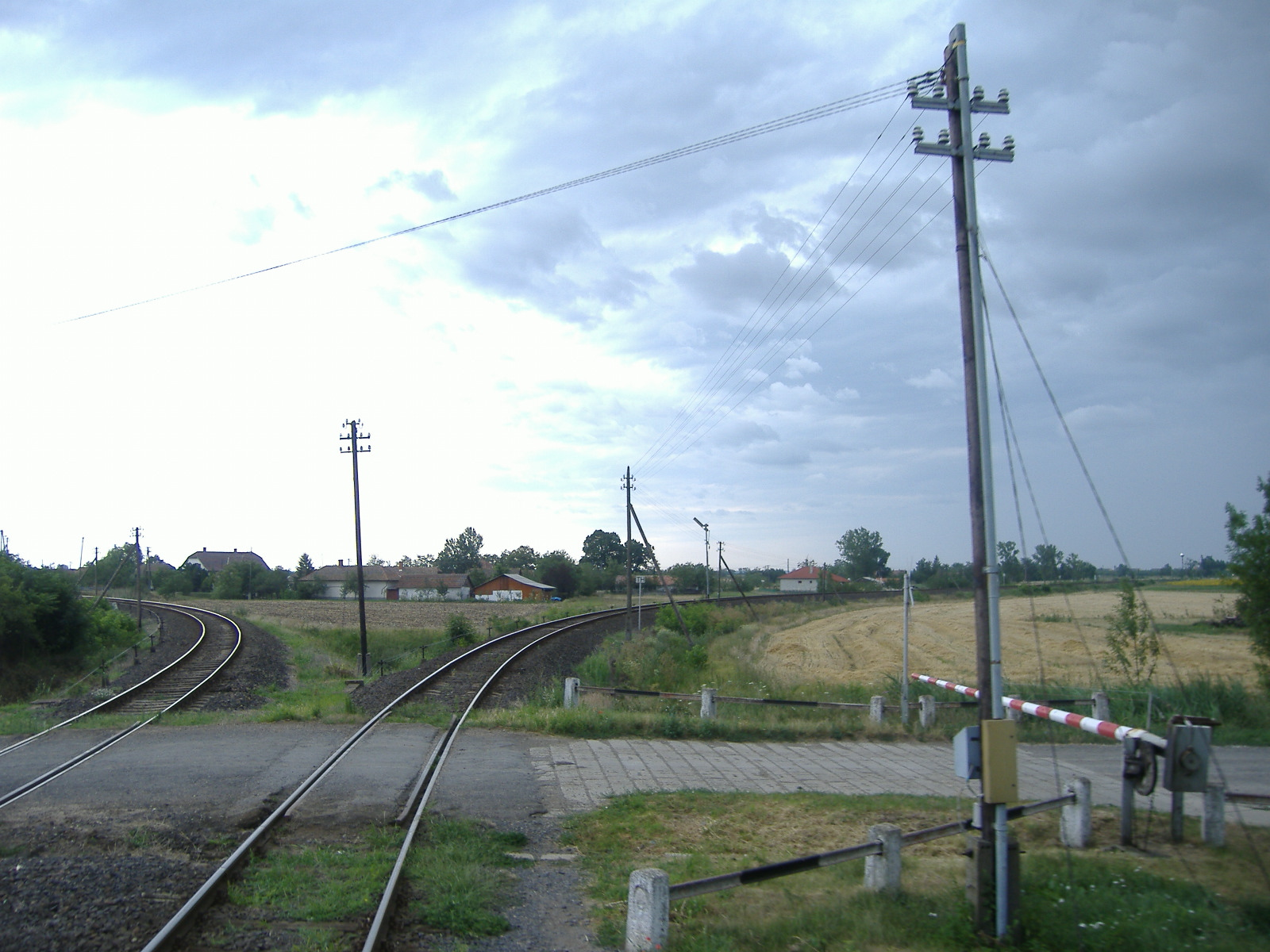
Landscape in Dévaványa

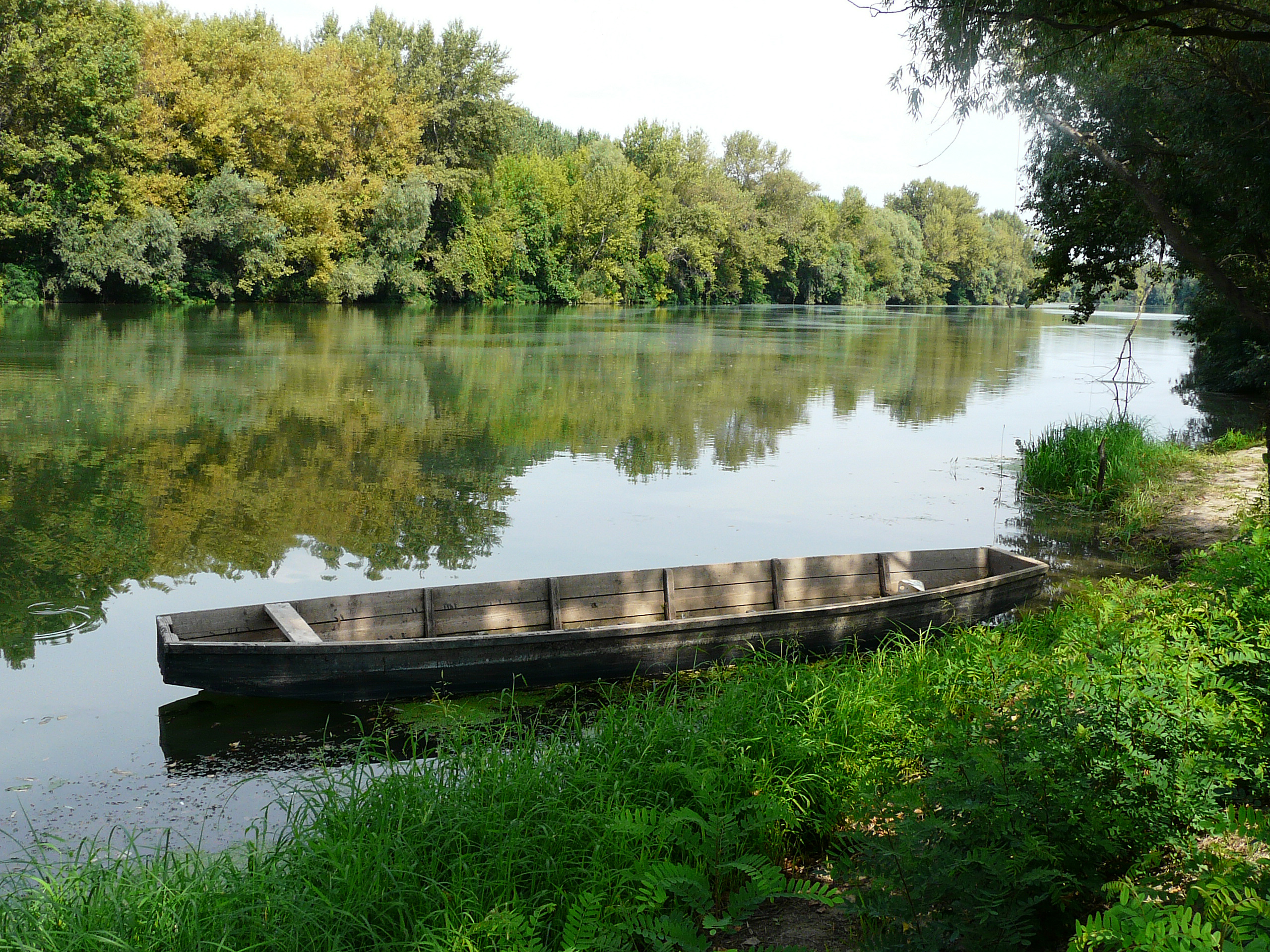
Körös river near Gyoma

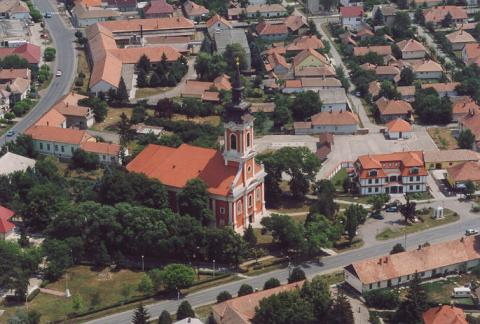
St. Emeric Church in Endrőd

== See also ==
- List of cities and towns of Hungary
