= Bucsa, Hungary =

Coordinates: 47°12′N 21°00′E

Bucsa
- Interactive map of Bucsa
- Country: Hungary
- County: Békés

Area
  - Total: 55.84 km^{2} (21.56 sq mi)

Population (2015)
  - Total: 2,179
  - Density: 39/km^{2} (100/sq mi)
- Time zone: UTC+1 (CET)
  - Summer (DST): UTC+2 (CEST)
- Postal code: 5527
- Area code: 66

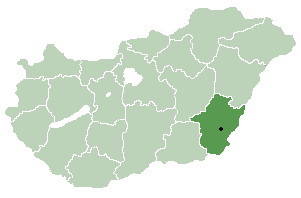
Location of Békés County in Hungary

Bucsa is a village in Békés County, in the Southern Great Plain region of south-east Hungary.

== Geography ==
It covers an area of 55.84 km^{2} and has a population of 2179 people (2015).
