= Gyomaendrőd =

- Town
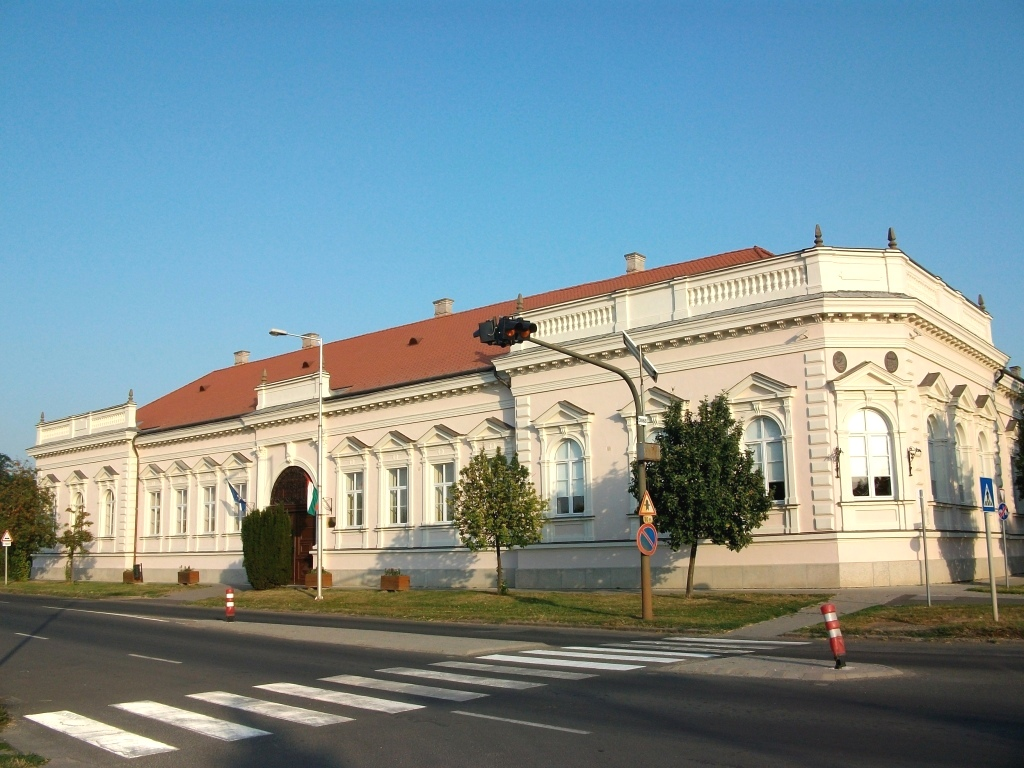
- Town hall

- Flag Coat of arms

- Location within Hungary
- Coordinates: 46°56′10″N 20°49′25″E
- Country: Hungary
- County: Békés
- District: Gyomaendrőd

Area
  - Total: 303.98 km^{2} (117.37 sq mi)

Population (2011)
  - Total: 13,680
  - Density: 49.66/km^{2} (128.6/sq mi)
- Time zone: UTC+1 (CET)
  - Summer (DST): UTC+2 (CEST)
- Postal code: 5500, 5502
- Area code: (+36) 66
- Website: www.gyomaendrod.hu

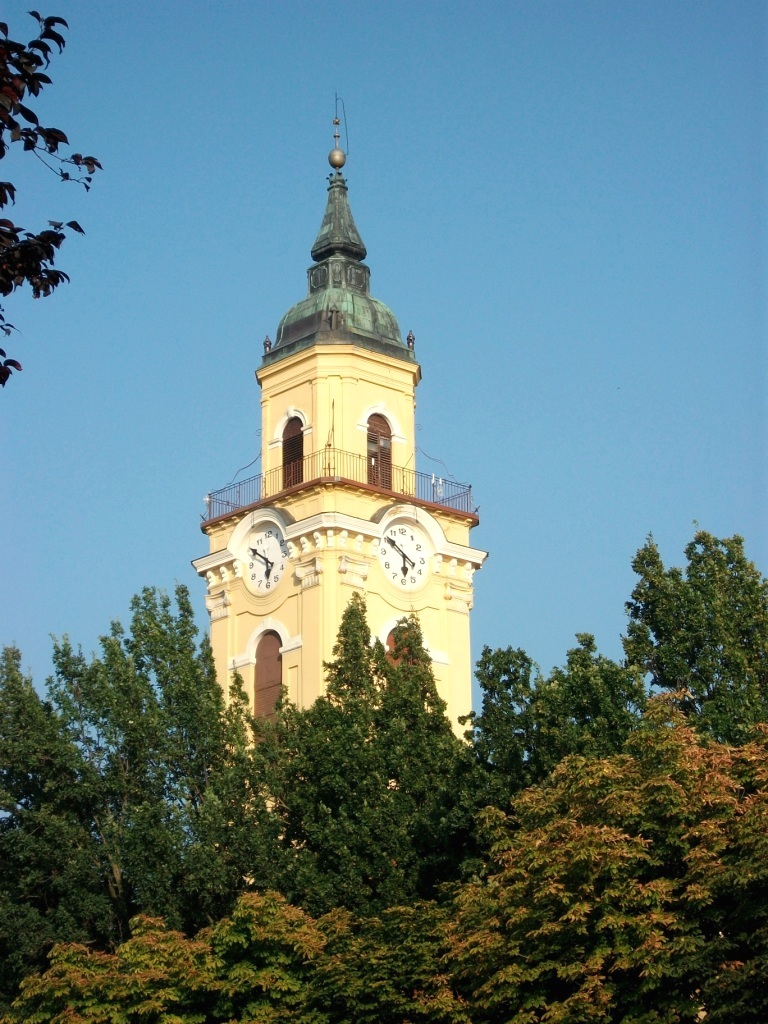
Spire of the Calvinist church

Gyomaendrőd (Hungarian pronunciation: [ˈɟomɒɛndrøːd]) is a town in Békés county, Hungary. The city covers an area of 303.98 km2 with 15,095 residents. The approach to the town is excellent both by road and railway, as the city is crossed by highway number 46 and the Budapest-Szolnok-Békéscsaba-Lőkösháza railway line. Gyomaendröd is located on the Great Hungarian Plain on the Körös River, 177 km southeast of Budapest.

== Name ==
Gyoma is an old Hungarian male given name, while Endrőd means "belongs to Endre (Hungarian to Andrew)" or "property of Endre".

== Geography ==
Gyomaendrőd is located in the Great Hungarian Plain upon the river Körös, 177 km (110 mi) southeast from Budapest. Highway 46, 443 and Budapest-Szolnok-Békéscsaba-Lökösháza high speed (120–160 km/h (75–99 mph)) railway line also cross the town.

== History ==
The smaller towns of Gyoma and Endrőd were united in 1982. Gyoma was first mentioned in 1332, while Endrőd in 1416. Medieval towns were ruined due to the Ottoman wars, native Hungarian population fled from the area. It was uninhabited until the early 18th century, when Calvinist Hungarians reestablished Gyoma. Calvinist church was built from 1791 to 1813. Endrőd was rebuilt by Roman Catholic Slovaks and Hungarians from Upper Hungary. Slovaks adopted Hungarian language and assimilated into the Hungarian majority by the 19th century. Lutheran Germans also settled in Gyoma in the early 19th century, their church was built in 1862. In the 20th century Gyomaendrőd became a resort town, the government granted town rights in 1989.

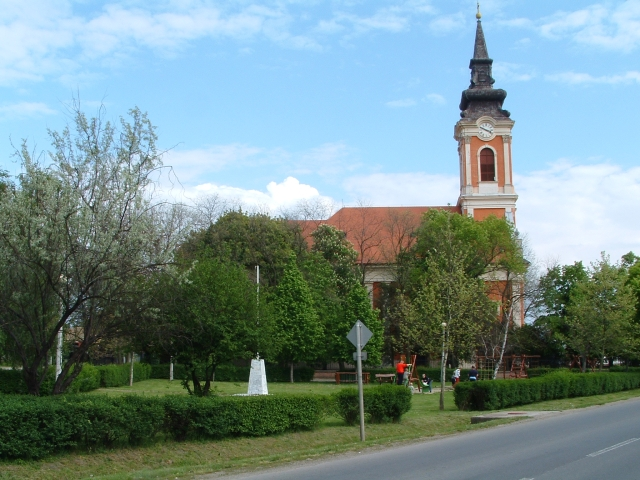
Roman Catholic Church of Saint Emeric

== Attractions ==
=== Roman Catholic Church of Saint Emeric ===
The Roman Catholic Church of Saint Emeric (Szent Imre) in Endrőd was built in 1804 in Late Baroque style. Its patron saint is Prince Saint Emeric who also figured on Endrőd's old coat of arms. The vintage church pews are registered monuments and are especially valuable. Its first foundation stones were laid on 6 November 1798 as the old church in the Templom-zug was too close to the Körös River (only 8 paces away) thus it was in constant danger of flooding. The new church was placed southwards from the old one and farther from the river. Its benediction took place on 5 November 1804 and it was consecrated on 9 May 1824. The stone statues of Saint Peter and Saint Paul were made in Eger in 1808 and placed in niches on the forefront of the church. In those days the church had five bells from which only three are functional today and these are the Saint Stephen, Saint Emeric and the so-called Death bell.

=== Sacred Heart of Jesus Catholic Church ===
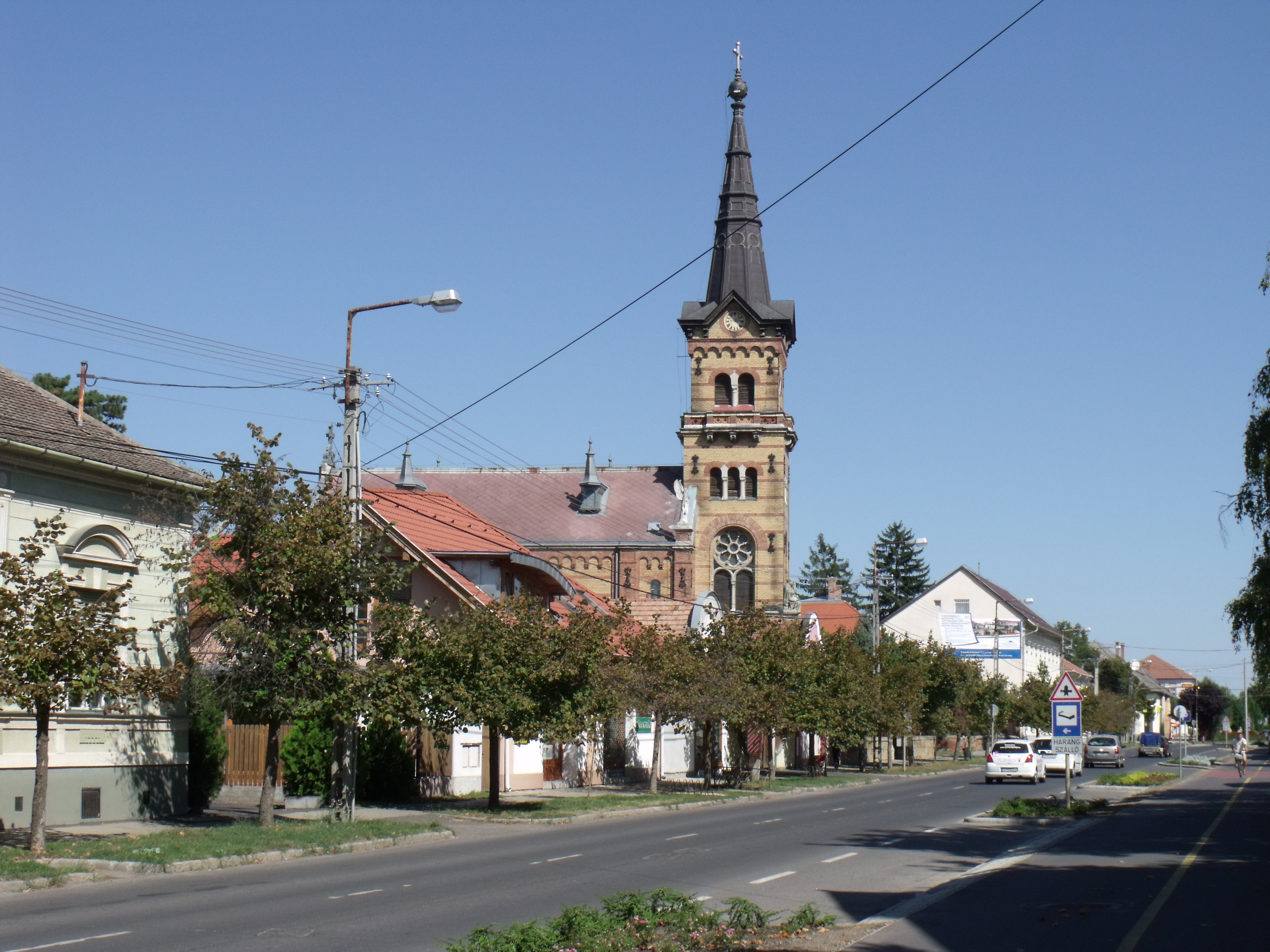
Sacred Heart of Jesus Catholic Church

In Gyoma there is a mighty edifice standing out loftily, the Sacred Heart of Jesus Catholic Church. It's the Jerusalem of the local Roman Catholic community. On 8 April 1848 a huge fire broke out and the Catholic Church burnt down to the ground along with its parish and many houses. The new church and presbytery was established in 1862. The foundation stones of the current church were laid on 1 May 1877 according to the design of Alajos Hauszmann, professor of the University of Technology. With the plans there were documents enclosed conveying information on the erstwhile circumstances of the era and disclosing the names and data of religious and secular magistrates. The church was built in neo-Renaissance style and the high altar picture depicts the Sacred Heart of Jesus. It has a painted coffered ceiling and in the altars the relics of Saint Innocent and Saint Faustina are to be found.

=== Reformed Church ===
The building of the church took 22 years. The foundation of the tower was laid in 1791 but we have no written records of the builders. Though the foundation of the nave was laid only in 1807 they had started to build it already from 1805. It was consecrated on 8 August 1813. The pipe organ was designed by Zsigmond Papp stonemason master (an amateur carver, painter, and sculptor) and was built with the assistance of a master woodworker. The oak doors of the church were also carved by Zsigmond Papp.

=== Lutheran Church ===
In 1830 the Town of Gyoma resettled Germans next to the Hungarian population in order to rise to the rank of a market-town and thus have the right to open a market. The German settlers received parcels with gardens in the so-called “German district” free of charge. The churches and schools received free building sites from the squire and also land to be cultivated to support themselves in the Német-zug. The newly formed Lutheran Congregation of Gyoma got its own pastor. The construction of the building was finished and consecrated in 1862 by the Germans migrated here from Mezőberény, Szemlak and Vadkert. The whole furnishing had been completed, the bells cast and installed when in 1887 the church tower took fire. The roof and interior of the church burnt out and had to be rebuilt. It was finished by 1888 and the church was consecrated again. In the garden of the Lutheran Church there are two memorials displayed. One plaque is erected for the memory of the slave-laborers deported to the Soviet Union and of those fallen in World War II. The other one is placed for our brethren who died a glorious death between 1914 and 1918 in World War I.

=== Kner Printing Museum ===
The Kner Collection of Printing History is housed in the former residence of Imre Kner. The house was designed by Lajos Kozma and built in 1925 in a so-called “folk-baroque” style. Since 1970, the building has housed one of the nation's most complete collection of printing history. The Museum showcases the works of members of the Kner Family and displays the history of the Gyomai Kner Printing Company from its founding in 1882 to our present day. Visitors have a chance to see books, ball invitations, calendars, letterheads, posters, shares, early photographs, and historic documents all originally printed at Kner in the exhibitions. Traditional functioning printing and binding machines enhance the visiting experience.

Béla Vidovszky City Gallery

Opened on 4 December 1993, the exhibition space in six rooms presents the works of visual artists associated with our city to the public in their permanent exhibition: paintings and personal memories of Béla Vidovszky (1883-1973), Margit Corini (1897-1982) the painter of the Parisian night, Graphics and paintings by Péter Illéssy (1902-1962), paintings and study drawings by László Holló (1887-1976), sculptures by János Pásztor (1881-1945) from the Hungarian National Gallery.

=== Endrőd Landscape House ===
The first museum exhibition space of the Endrőd settlement is the country house established in 1977. The museum presenting the folk architecture and housing culture of Endrőd's peasant society. The builder of the building, which is protected as a monument, is István Hunya, a large farmer with 80 acres. The imposing street facade of the house represents the classicist architectural style of the urbanizing peasant taste.

The farmhouse belongs to the Great Plain, Central Hungarian house type, including the front and side porch versions. The entrance to the house opens from the side porch and leads from here to the kitchen. From the kitchen, go to the big house (great room) to the right, to the cold house (small house, small room) to the left, and then to the upper chamber. The entrance to the granary (grain and threshing chamber) also opens from the side porch, from which the home bar was separated.

Gyomaendrőd Thermal pool

The construction of the spa, hidden in a 2.4-hectare area among the hundred-year-old oak trees of the Erzsébet grove, took place from 1959 to 1963. The thermal water with alkaline hydrogen carbonate, which contains a significant amount of fluoride, received the medical water certification in 1960.The medical department of the spa offers complete physiotherapy treatment to those who wish to recover. The medical department consists of two thermal pools with medicinal water. The outdoor pools, enriched with imposing trees, provide both shaded and sunny areas for pleasant relaxation. There is a 39-40 °C therapeutic pool, a swimming pool, child pool.

== Demographics ==
According to the 2011 census the total population of Gyomaendrőd was 13,680, of whom there were 11,547 (84.4%) Hungarians, 613 (4.5%) Romani and 163 (1.2%) Germans by ethnicity. 15.6% did not declare their ethnicity, excluding these people Hungarians made up 100% of the total population. In Hungary people can declare more than one ethnicity, so some people declared a minority one along with Hungarian.

In 2011 there were 3,458 (25.3%) Roman Catholic, 1,483 (10.8%) Hungarian Reformed (Calvinist) and 183 (1.3%) Lutheran in Gyomaendrőd. 4,644 people (34.0%) were irreligious and 170 (1.2%) Atheist, while 3,602 people (26.3%) did not declare their religion.

== Notable people ==
- János Pásztor (1881–1945), sculptor
- Kálmán Rózsahegyi (1873–1961), actor
- Ferenc Kállai (1925–2010), actor
- Lajos Németh (1944–2014), FIFA football referee

== Twin towns – sister cities ==
Gyomaendrőd is twinned with:

- Aiud, Romania (1993)
- Pilzno, Poland
- Schöneck, Germany
