= List of members of the National Assembly of Hungary (2010–2014) =

National Assembly of Hungary (2010–2014)

Type
- Type: unicameral
- Houses: National Assembly

History
- Founded: 14 May 2010
- Disbanded: 5 May 2014 (3 years, 356 days)
- Preceded by: Members 2006–2010
- Succeeded by: Members 2014–2018

Leadership
- Speaker: Pál Schmitt, Fidesz 14 May – 6 August 2010 László Kövér, Fidesz 6 August 2010 – 14 May 2014

Structure
- Seats: 386
- Political groups: At opening: Government (263): Fidesz (227); KDNP (36); Opposition (123): MSZP (59); Jobbik (47); LMP (16); Ind. (1)

Elections
- Last election: 11 and 25 April 2010
- Next election: 6 April 2014

Meeting place
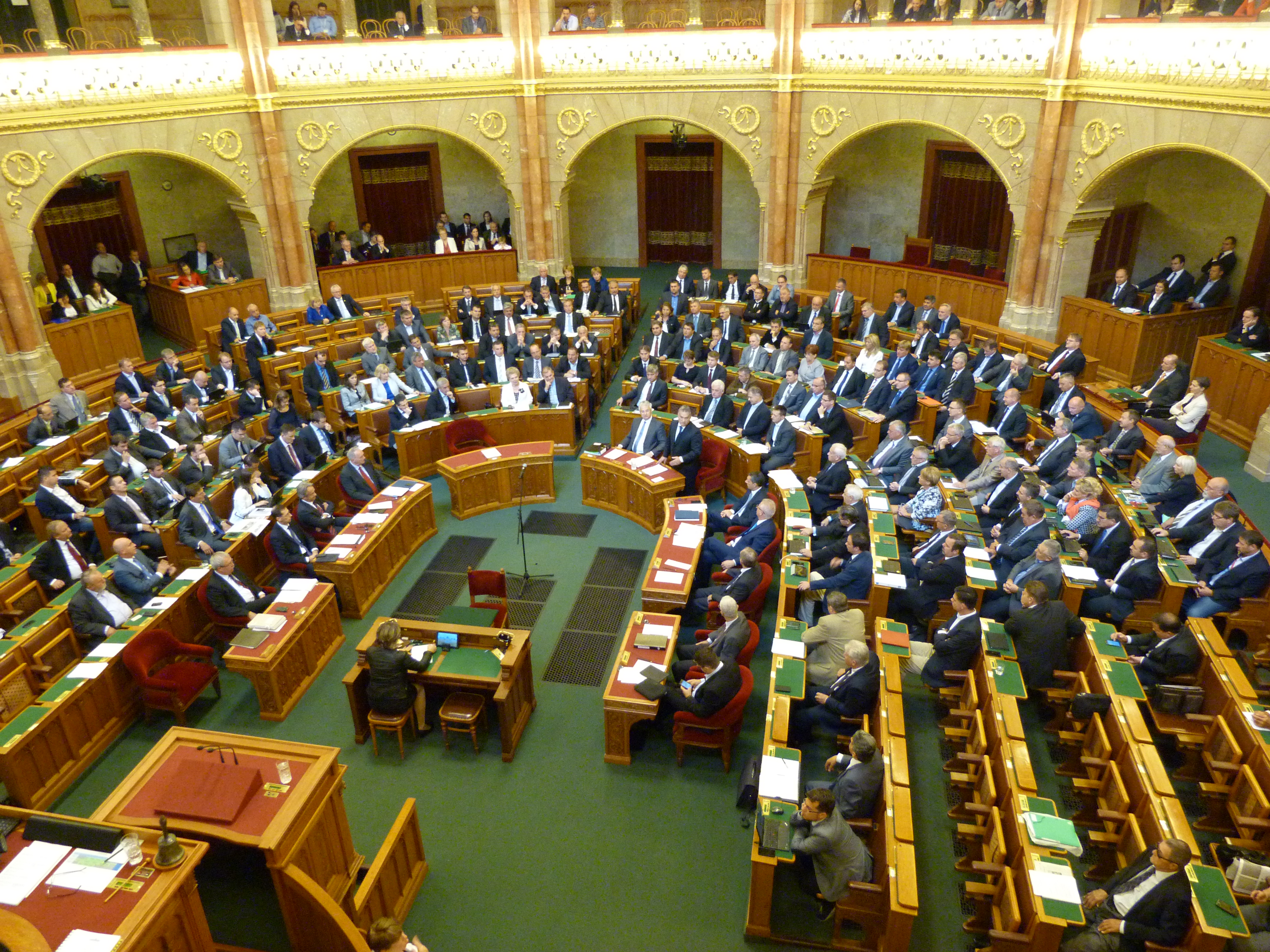
- Hungarian Parliament Building; Lajos Kossuth Square 1 Budapest, H-1055; Hungary

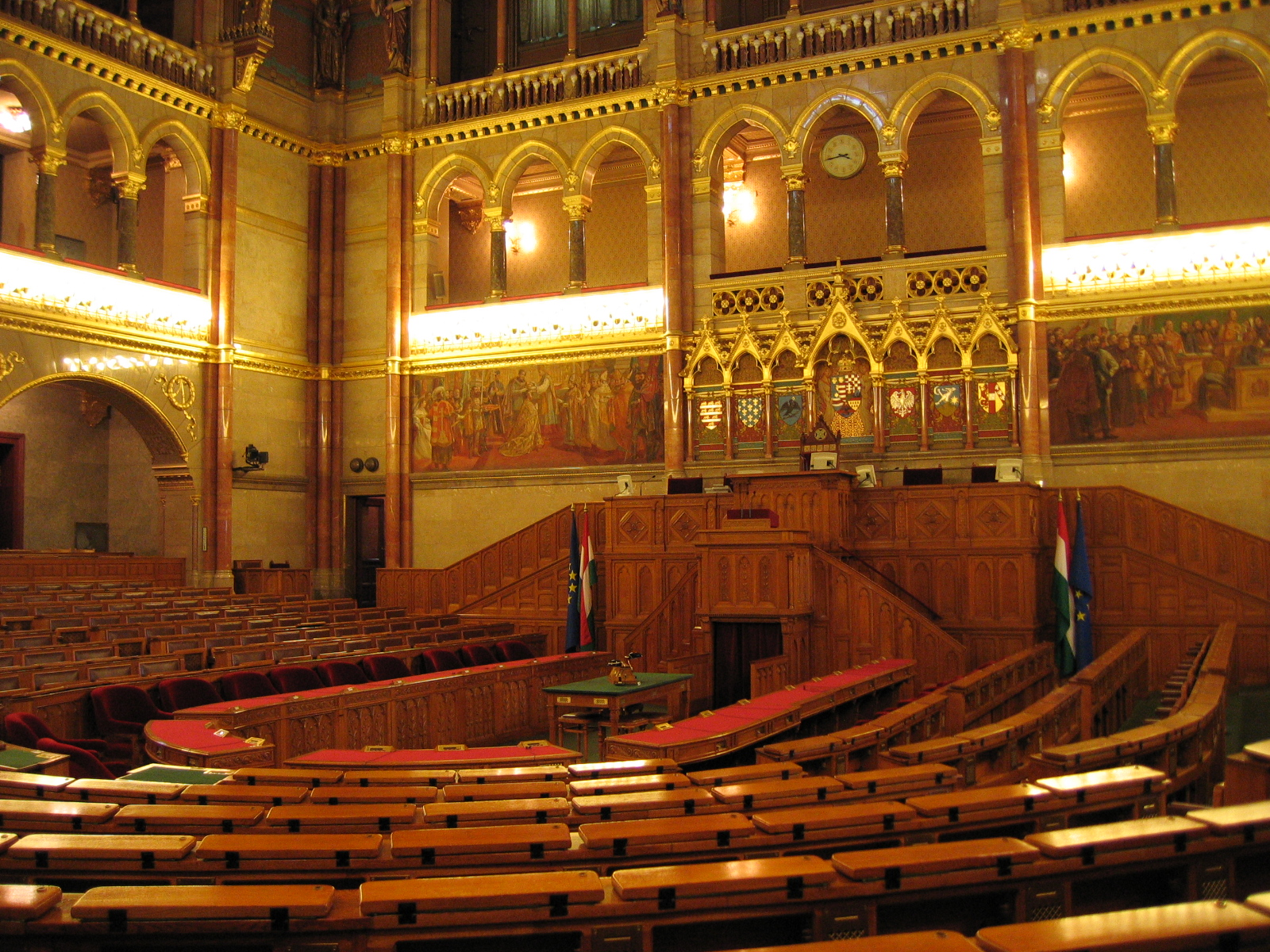
House of Representatives in the Hungarian Parliament

The list of members of the National Assembly of Hungary (2010–14) is the list of members of the National Assembly – the unicameral legislative body of Hungary – according to the outcome of the Hungarian parliamentary election of 2010. The members of the new National Assembly were installed on May 14, 2010 and their mandates lasted until May 5, 2014. There has been a sizable number of mutations since due to the particular nature of the Hungary constitutional system. New members are supplied from their party lists so the resignation of individual members' seats does not change the balance of power in the National Assembly.

== Officials ==
=== Speaker of the National Assembly ===
- Pál Schmitt (Fidesz) (May 14, 2010 – August 5, 2010)
- László Kövér (Fidesz) (August 5, 2010 – May 5, 2014)

=== First Officer of the National Assembly ===
- Márta Mátrai (Fidesz) (January 1, 2013 – May 5, 2014)

=== Deputy Speakers of the National Assembly ===
- Zoltán Balczó (Jobbik)
- István Jakab (Fidesz)
- János Latorcai (KDNP)
- Sándor Lezsák (Fidesz)
- István Ujhelyi (MSZP)

=== Recorders ===
- Norbert Erdős (Fidesz) (May 14, 2010 – February 22, 2011)
- Gyula Földesi (Fidesz)
- István Göndör (MSZP)
- Enikő Hegedűs (Jobbik)
- Balázs Lenhardt (Jobbik) (May 14, 2010 – November 7, 2012)
- József Attila Móring (KDNP)
- István Nyakó (MSZP)
- Ágnes Osztolykán (LMP) (September 30, 2013 – May 5, 2014)
- Endre Spaller (KDNP) (September 30, 2013 – January 31, 2014)
- Bence Stágel (KDNP) (February 22, 2011 – May 31, 2013)
- Péter Szilágyi (LMP; Ind.) (May 14, 2010 – September 22, 2013)
- Lajos Szűcs (Fidesz)
- Richárd Tarnai (KDNP) (May 14, 2010 – February 22, 2011)
- István Tiba (Fidesz) (February 22, 2011 – May 5, 2014)
- Imre Vejkey (KDNP) (June 17, 2013 – September 19, 2013)
- Dániel Z. Kárpát (Jobbik) (November 19, 2012 – May 5, 2014)

=== Father of the House ===
- János Horváth (Fidesz) (age 88 in 2010)

=== Baby of the House ===
- Dóra Dúró (Jobbik) (age 23 in 2010)

==== Senior Recorders ====
- Tibor Bana (Jobbik) (age 24 in 2010)
- Gergely Farkas (Jobbik) (age 23 in 2010)
- Tamás Gergő Samu (Jobbik) (age 24 in 2010)

== Parliamentary groups ==
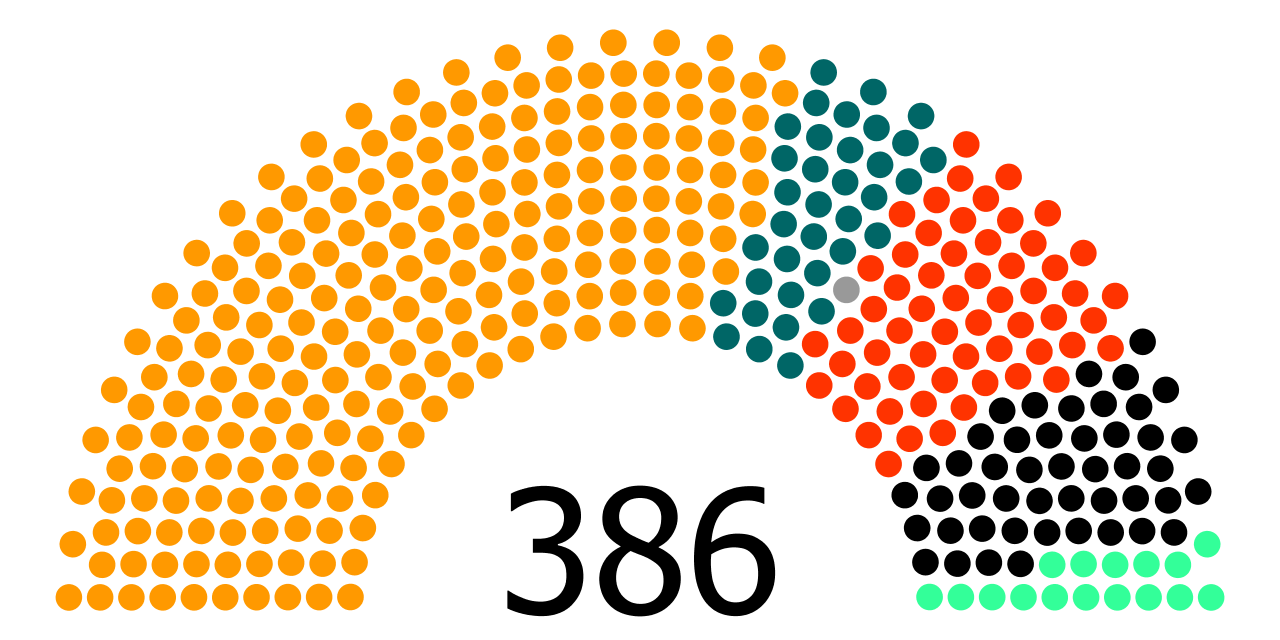

↓
263	59	47	16	1
Fidesz–KDNP	MSZP	Jobbik	LMP	Ind.

Groups		Members		Chairperson(s)		Status
Groups		At foundation 14 May 2010	At dissolvation 5 May 2014	Chairperson(s)		Status
Fidesz–KDNP Coalition	Fidesz	227 / 386	223 / 381	János Lázár	14 May 2010 – 1 June 2012	Government
Fidesz–KDNP Coalition	Fidesz	227 / 386	223 / 381	Antal Rogán	2 June 2012 – 5 May 2014	Government
Fidesz–KDNP Coalition	Christian Democratic People's Party (KDNP)	36 / 386	34 / 381	Péter Harrach	14 May 2010 – 5 May 2014	Government
Hungarian Socialist Party (MSZP)		59 / 386	47 / 381	Attila Mesterházy	14 May 2010 – 5 May 2014	Opposition
Jobbik		47 / 386	43 / 381	Gábor Vona	14 May 2010 – 5 May 2014	Opposition
Politics Can Be Different (LMP)		16 / 386	7 / 381	András Schiffer	14 May 2010 – 13 January 2012	Opposition
Politics Can Be Different (LMP)		16 / 386	7 / 381	Benedek Jávor	1 February 2012 – 18 November 2012	Opposition
Politics Can Be Different (LMP)		16 / 386	7 / 381	András Schiffer	26 November 2012 – 11 February 2013	Opposition
Politics Can Be Different (LMP)		16 / 386	7 / 381	András Schiffer	1 September 2013 – 5 May 2014	Opposition
Democratic Coalition (DK)		0 / 386	10 / 381	–	–	Opposition
Dialogue for Hungary (PM)		0 / 386	8 / 381	–	–	Opposition
Independent		1 / 386	9 / 381	–	–	Opposition
Source: Országgyűlés

Note: DK and PM politicians were also technically independent MPs

== Members of the National Assembly ==
=== Parties of the Coalition Government ===
==== Fidesz ====
- Péter Ágh (Vas County Regional List)
- Sándor Arnóth (Hajdú-Bihar County VI)
- László B. Nagy (Csongrád County Regional List)
- Mihály Babák (Békés County Regional List)
- Gabriella Bábi-Szottfried (Pest County II)
- János Bácskai (Budapest XII)
- József Balázs (Heves County III)
- György Balla (Jász-Nagykun-Szolnok County Regional List)
- Mihály Balla (Nógrád County IV)
- Zoltán Balog (Borsod-Abaúj-Zemplén County Regional List)
- István Balsai (Budapest II)
- Erik Bánki (Baranya County Regional List)
- Gábor Bányai (Bács-Kiskun County X)
- Mónika Bartos (Hajdú-Bihar County Regional List)
- István Bebes (Vas County Regional List)
- Zsolt Becsó (Nógrád County II)
- János Bencsik (Komárom-Esztergom County I)
- Ildikó Bene (Jász-Nagykun-Szolnok County IV)
- László Berényi (Somogy County Regional List)
- Márk Bíró (Nógrád County Regional List)
- Imre Bodó (Csongrád County I)
- Sándor Bodó (Hajdú-Bihar County VI)
- Zsolt Bohács (Csongrád County III)
- István Bóka (Veszprém County II)
- István Boldog (Jász-Nagykun-Szolnok County VI)
- Lénárd Borbély (Budapest XXX)
- Zsolt Borkai (Győr-Moson-Sopron County III)
- Éva Brájer (Fejér County Regional List)
- Márton Braun (Tolna County Regional List)
- Gyula Budai (Szabolcs-Szatmár-Bereg County IV)
- Zsolt Csampa (Borsod-Abaúj-Zemplén County Regional List)
- Zsolt Csenger-Zalán (Pest County IX)
- Péter Cseresnyés (Zala County II)
- Gábor Cserna (Fejér County Regional List)
- András Cser-Palkovics (Fejér County I)
- Péter Csizi (Baranya County Regional List)
- György Csóti (Budapest Regional List)
- Katalin Csöbör (Borsod-Abaúj-Zemplén County I)
- György Czerván (Pest County VI)
- Szabolcs Czira (Pest County XVI)
- Sándor Czomba (Szabolcs-Szatmár-Bereg County VIII)
- Judit Czunyi-Bertalan (Komárom-Esztergom County III)
- Pierre Daher (Borsod-Abaúj-Zemplén County Regional List)
- József Dancsó (Békés County VI)
- Béla Dankó (Békés County V)
- Ervin Demeter (Heves County Regional List)
- Zoltán Demeter (Borsod-Abaúj-Zemplén County VI)
- Csaba Dióssi (Pest County III)
- László Domokos (Békés County V)
- Lajos Dorkota (Fejér County III)
- Ilona Ékes (Budapest Regional List)
- József Ékes (Veszprém County I)
- Norbert Erdős (Békés County III)
- Flórián Farkas (Budapest Regional List)
- Sándor Farkas (Csongrád County V)
- Zoltán Farkas (Békés County IV)
- Sándor Fazekas (Jász-Nagykun-Szolnok County Regional List)
- Andor Fejér (Jász-Nagykun-Szolnok County VII)
- János Fónagy (Budapest X)
- Sándor Font (Bács-Kiskun County VI)
- Gyula Földesi (Budapest XXIX)
- István Fülöp (Szabolcs-Szatmár-Bereg County IX)
- Róbert Gajda (Békés County Regional List)
- Attila Gelencsér (Somogy County II)
- Attila Gruber (Somogy County III)
- Dénes Gulyás (Pest County X)
- Gergely Gulyás (Vas County Regional List)
- Endre Gyimesi (Zala County I)
- Alpár Gyopáros (Győr-Moson-Sopron County V)
- Balázs Győrffy (Veszprém County Regional List)
- István György (Budapest XIV)
- Csaba Gyutai (Zala County Regional List)
- Sándor Hadházy (Pest County XI)
- János Halász (Hajdú-Bihar County II)
- Miklós Hanó (Békés County Regional List)
- Tamás Heintz (Somogy County I)
- Csaba Hende (Vas County II)
- István Herman (Heves County VI)
- Balázs Hidvéghi (National List)
- Ferenc Hirt (Tolna County V)
- Antal Gábor Hollósi (Budapest V)
- Péter Hoppál (Baranya County I)
- István Horváth (Tolna County I)
- János Horváth (Fejér County Regional List)
- László Horváth (Heves County II)
- Zoltán Horváth (Baranya County Regional List)
- Zsolt Horváth (Bács-Kiskun County II)
- Zsolt Horváth (Veszprém County VI)
- Richárd Hörcsik (Borsod-Abaúj-Zemplén County X)
- Zoltán Illés (Budapest VIII)
- László Iván (Borsod-Abaúj-Zemplén County Regional List)
- Ferenc Ivanics (Győr-Moson-Sopron County VI)
- István Jakab (Szabolcs-Szatmár-Bereg County Regional List)
- Krisztián Kapus (Bács-Kiskun County V)
- Ákos Kara (Győr-Moson-Sopron County I)
- László Karakó (Szabolcs-Szatmár-Bereg County III)
- János Kerényi (Bács-Kiskun County Regional List)
- Attila Kiss (Hajdú-Bihar County IX)
- Máté Kocsis (Budapest XI)
- Ferenc Koncz (Borsod-Abaúj-Zemplén County XI)
- Károly Kontrát (Veszprém County Regional List)
- Pál Kontur (Komárom-Esztergom County Regional List)
- Lajos Kósa (Hajdú-Bihar County III)
- László Koszorús (Baranya County Regional List)
- Ernő Kovács (Bács-Kiskun County Regional List)
- Ferenc Kovács (Vas County IV)
- Ferenc Kovács (Szabolcs-Szatmár-Bereg County I)
- József Kovács (Békés County II)
- Péter Kovács (Budapest XXIV)
- Zoltán Kovács (Veszprém County III)
- Péter Kozma (Szabolcs-Szatmár-Bereg County Regional List)
- Zoltán Kőszegi (Pest County Regional List)
- János Kővári (Baranya County III)
- László Kövér (Zala County Regional List)
- Gábor Kubatov (Budapest Regional List)
- László Kucsák (Budapest XXVI)
- József Kulcsár (Budapest XXII)
- Lajos Kupcsok (Pest County Regional List)
- András Kupper (Budapest XVII)
- László L. Simon (Fejér County IV)
- Magdolna Lakatos-Sira (Szabolcs-Szatmár-Bereg County Regional List)
- Zsolt Láng (Budapest Regional List; then Budapest II)
- Tamás László (Budapest XXIII)
- Jenő Lasztovicza (Veszprém County IV)
- János Lázár (Csongrád County VI)
- Sándor Lezsák (Bács-Kiskun County III)
- Sándor Lipők (Szabolcs-Szatmár-Bereg County V)
- László Lukács (Bács-Kiskun County VIII)
- Andrea Mágori (Csongrád County VII)
- Anna Magyar (Csongrád County Regional List)
- Jenő Manninger (Zala County III)
- Attila Márton (Hajdú-Bihar County VII)
- György Matolcsy (Bács-Kiskun County Regional List)
- Márta Mátrai (Somogy County Regional List)
- Tamás Meggyes (Komárom-Esztergom County V)
- Erzsébet Menczer (Budapest III)
- Roland Mengyi (Borsod-Abaúj-Zemplén County XII)
- Péter Mihalovics (Veszprém County Regional List)
- István Mikola (Fejér County Regional List)
- Ágnes Molnár (Győr-Moson-Sopron County Regional List)
- Attila Molnár (Komárom-Esztergom County Regional List)
- Csaba Nagy (Baranya County II)
- Gábor Tamás Nagy (Budapest I)
- István Nagy (Budapest Regional List)
- István Nagy (Győr-Moson-Sopron County IV)
- Tibor Navracsics (Veszprém County VII)
- Szilárd Németh (Budapest XXXI)
- Zoltán Németh (Budapest XXXII)
- Zsolt Németh (Budapest Regional List)
- Zoltán Nógrádi (Csongrád County II)
- Zsolt Nyitrai (Heves County Regional List)
- Ferenc Obreczán (Pest County Regional List)
- Ferenc Ódor (Borsod-Abaúj-Zemplén County IX)
- Viktor Orbán (Fejér County Regional List)
- László Örvendi (Hajdú-Bihar County Regional List)
- Károly Pánczél (Pest County XIII)
- Ferenc Papcsák (Budapest XXI)
- Vilmos Patay (Tolna County IV)
- Ildikó Pelczné Gáll (Borsod-Abaúj-Zemplén County Regional List)
- Imre Pesti (Budapest Regional List)
- Imre Pichler (Baranya County VII)
- László Pintér (Zala County IV)
- János Pócs (Jász-Nagykun-Szolnok County II)
- Tibor Pogácsás (Pest County VII)
- Zoltán Pokorni (Budapest XVIII)
- József Polics (Baranya County IV)
- László Pósán (Hajdú-Bihar County I)
- Árpád Potápi (Tolna County III)
- Imre Puskás (Tolna County Regional List)
- Róbert Rácz (Hajdú-Bihar County Regional List)
- Róbert Répássy (Borsod-Abaúj-Zemplén County Regional List)
- Máriusz Révész (Budapest Regional List)
- Gábor Riz (Borsod-Abaúj-Zemplén County V)
- Levente Riz (Budapest XXV)
- Antal Rogán (Budapest VII)
- István Román (Szabolcs-Szatmár-Bereg County Regional List)
- Monika Rónaszéki-Keresztes (Budapest IX)
- István Sági (Jász-Nagykun-Szolnok County V)
- Csaba Schmidt (Komárom-Esztergom County Regional List)
- Pál Schmitt (National List)
- László Sebestyén (Borsod-Abaúj-Zemplén County IV)
- Gabriella Selmeczi (Pest County Regional List)
- Miklós Simon (Szabolcs-Szatmár-Bereg County VI)
- György Simonka (Békés County VII)
- Csaba Szabó (Nógrád County Regional List)
- Erika Szabó (Bács-Kiskun County Regional List)
- Tamás Szabó (Jász-Nagykun-Szolnok County I)
- Zsolt Szabó (Heves County IV)
- Imre Szakács (Győr-Moson-Sopron County II)
- Ferenc Szalay (Jász-Nagykun-Szolnok County III)
- Péter Szalay (Budapest Regional List)
- Kristóf Szatmáry (Budapest Regional List)
- Attila Szedlák (Veszprém County Regional List)
- József Szekó (Baranya County Regional List)
- Melinda Széky-Sztrémi (Nógrád County I)
- Klaudia Szemerey-Pataki (Bács-Kiskun County Regional List)
- Péter Szijjártó (Győr-Moson-Sopron County Regional List)
- Tibor Szólláth (Hajdú-Bihar County Regional List)
- Lajos Szűcs (Pest County XIV)
- Márta Talabér (Veszprém County V)
- András Tállai (Borsod-Abaúj-Zemplén County XIII)
- Barnabás Tamás (Borsod-Abaúj-Zemplén County VII)
- Gergely Tapolczai (National List)
- István Tarlós (Budapest Regional List)
- László Tasó (Hajdú-Bihar County IV)
- Zoltán Tessely (Fejér County VII)
- István Tiba (Hajdú-Bihar County VIII)
- Zsolt Tiffán (Baranya County VI)
- Attila Tilki (Szabolcs-Szatmár-Bereg County X)
- Ferenc Tóth (Tolna County II)
- Gábor Tóth (Pest County V)
- József Tóth (Heves County V)
- Gábor Törő (Fejér County V)
- Béla Turi-Kovács (Pest County Regional List)
- Attila Ughy (Budapest XXVII)
- Zsolt V. Németh (Vas County V)
- Gyula Vantara (Békés County I)
- Gábor Varga (Fejér County VI)
- István Varga (Jász-Nagykun-Szolnok County Regional List)
- József Varga (Budapest Regional List)
- Mihály Varga (Jász-Nagykun-Szolnok County VIII)
- Tamás Vargha (Fejér County II)
- Imre Vas (Budapest XIII)
- László Vécsey (Pest County IV)
- László Vigh (Zala County V)
- László Vincze (Csongrád County IV)
- Győző Vinnai (Szabolcs-Szatmár-Bereg County II)
- István Vitányi (Hajdú-Bihar County V)
- Pál Völner (Komárom-Eszterom County IV)
- Zsolt Wintermantel (Budapest VI)
- Mária Wittner (National List)
- Gábor Zombor (Bács-Kiskun County I)
- Marcell Zsiga (Borsod-Abaúj-Zemplén County II)
- Róbert Zsigó (Bács-Kiskun County IX)

==== KDNP ====
- András Aradszki (Pest County VIII)
- Gábor Bagdy (Budapest Regional List)
- Tamás Básthy (Vas County III)
- Balázs Bús (Budapest IV)
- Mátyás Firtl (Győr-Moson-Sopron County VII)
- László Földi (Pest County XV)
- Gergely Gaal Pest County Regional List)
- László Habis (Heves County I)
- János Hargitai (Baranya County V)
- Péter Harrach (Pest County I)
- Pál Hoffman (Pest County XII)
- Rózsa Hoffmann (Győr-Moson-Sopron County Regional List)
- Ferenc Kalmár (Csongrád County Regional List)
- Ottó Karvalics (Somogy County VI)
- Erzsébet Lanczendorfer (Győr-Moson-Sopron County Regional List)
- János Latorcai (Békés County Regional List)
- Tamás Lukács (Heves County Regional List)
- József Michl (Komárom-Esztergom County II)
- József Attila Móring (Somogy County IV)
- Andor Nagy (Nógrád County III)
- Kálmán Nagy (Borsod-Abaúj-Zemplén County III)
- István Pálffy (Hajdú-Bihar County Regional List)
- Tivadar Puskás (Vas County I)
- Bence Rétvári (Budapest XV)
- György Rubovszky (Somogy County Regional List)
- László Salamon (Pest County Regional List)
- Tamás Sáringer-Kenyeres (Zala County Regional List)
- Zsolt Semjén (Bács-Kiskun County VII)
- Miklós Seszták (Szabolcs-Szatmár-Bereg County VII)
- Oszkár Seszták (Szabolcs-Szatmár-Bereg County Regional List)
- István Simicskó (Budapest XVI)
- Miklós Soltész (Pest County Regional List)
- Endre Spaller (Budapest Regional List)
- Bence Stágel (National List)
- László Szászfalvi (Somogy County V)
- Richárd Tarnai (Budapest XXVIII)
- László Varga (Bács-Kiskun County Regional List)
- Imre Vejkey (Tolna County Regional List)

=== Opposition parties ===
==== MSZP ====
- Ferenc Baja (National List)
- Gergely Bárándy (National List)
- László Boldvai (Nógrád County Regional List)
- László Botka (Csongrád County Regional List)
- Sándor Burány (Budapest Regional List)
- István Levente Garai (Bács-Kiskun County Regional List)
- Zoltán Gőgös (National List)
- István Göndör (National List)
- Nándor Gúr (Borsod-Abaúj-Zemplén County Regional List)
- Gábor Harangozó (National List)
- Tamás Harangozó (Tolna County Regional List)
- István Hiller (National List)
- András Tibor Horváth (Fejér County Regional List)
- Csaba Horváth (Budapest Regional List)
- György Ipkovich (Vas County Regional List)
- Imre Iváncsik (National List)
- István Józsa (Budapest Regional List)
- Ferenc Juhász (National List)
- Sándor Káli (Borsod-Abaúj-Zemplén County Regional List)
- Péter Kiss (National List)
- László Kovács (National List)
- Tibor Kovács (National List)
- László Kránitz (National List)
- Mónika Lamperth (National List)
- Ildikó Lendvai (Budapest Regional List)
- Zoltán Lukács (Komárom-Esztergom County Regional List)
- László Mandur (National List)
- Attila Mesterházy (National List)
- Zsolt Molnár (Budapest Regional List)
- András Nemény (National List)
- István Nyakó (National List)
- Béla Pál (Veszprém County Regional List)
- Tibor Pál (Budapest Regional List)
- László Puch (National List)
- Gábor Simon (National List)
- Gábor Simon (National List)
- Tamás Sós (Heves County Regional List)
- Pál Steiner (Budapest Regional List)
- Imre Szabó (Pest County Regional List)
- Vilmos Szabó (National List)
- Tibor Szanyi (Budapest XIX)
- Imre Szekeres (Jász-Nagykun-Szolnok County Regional List)
- József Tóbiás (National List)
- Csaba Tóth (Budapest Regional List)
- József Tóth (Budapest XX)
- István Tukacs (National List)
- István Ujhelyi (National List)
- László Varga (National List)
- Zoltán Varga (Békés County Regional List)
- János Veres (Szabolcs-Szatmár-Bereg County Regional List)

==== Jobbik ====
- István Apáti (National List)
- Zoltán Balczó (Budapest Regional List)
- Gergő Balla (Borsod-Abaúj-Zemplén County Regional List)
- Tibor Bana (National List)
- Zsolt Baráth (Jász-Nagykun-Szolnok County Regional List)
- Szilvia Bertha (National List)
- Barnabás Bödecs (National List)
- Dóra Dúró (National List)
- Zsolt Egyed (Borsod-Abaúj-Zemplén County Regional List)
- Gergely Farkas (Nógrád County Regional List)
- Gábor Ferenczi (Veszprém County Regional List)
- Tamás Gaudi-Nagy (Budapest Regional List)
- Géza Gyenes (National List)
- Márton Gyöngyösi (Bács-Kiskun County Regional List)
- Csaba Gyüre (Szabolcs-Szatmár-Bereg County Regional List)
- Enikő Hegedűs (National List)
- Tamás Hegedűs (National List)
- Nándor Jámbor (Békés County Regional List)
- Lajos Kepli (National List)
- Sándor Kiss (Szabolcs-Szatmár-Bereg County Regional List)
- Miklós Korondi (Pest County Regional List)
- Gergely Kulcsár (Hajdú Bihar County Regional List)
- Zoltán Magyar (Győr-Moson-Sopron County Regional List)
- Ádám Mirkóczki (National List)
- Levente Murányi (Jász-Nagykun-Szolnok County Regional List)
- Zsolt Németh (Baranya County Regional List)
- Előd Novák (National List)
- László Nyikos (National List)
- Sándor Pörzse (Budapest Regional List)
- Gergely Rubi (Hajdú-Bihar County Regional List)
- Tamás Gergő Samu (National List)
- Péter Schön (National List)
- Tamás Sneider (National List)
- Gábor Staudt (National List)
- Krisztián Suhajda (National List)
- Gábor Szabó (National List)
- István Szávay (National List)
- György Szilágyi (National List)
- Sebestyén Vágó (Komárom Esztergom County Regional List)
- Géza Varga (National List)
- János Volner (Pest County Regional List)
- Gábor Vona (Heves County Regional List)
- Dániel Z. Kárpát (National List)
- György Gyula Zagyva (Csongrád County Regional List)
- László Zakó (Zala County Regional List)

==== LMP ====
The LMP parliamentary group disbanded according to the house rules on February 11, 2013, when eight members left the party and its caucus. The incumbent representatives of the following members were technically independent MPs. However, the seven members of the LMP were able to re-establish the party's caucus on September 1, 2013, after the decision of the Committee on Immunity, Incompatibility and Mandate.

- Katalin Ertsey (National List)
- Virág Kaufer (National List)
- Endre Kukorelly (Pest County Regional List)
- Szilvia Lengyel (Pest County Regional List)
- Lajos Mile (National List)
- Ágnes Osztolykán (Budapest Regional List)
- András Schiffer (National List)
- Bernadett Szél (National List)
- Gábor Vágó (National List)

=== Independent members ===
- József Ángyán (Fidesz Pest County Regional List)
- József Balogh (Bács-Kiskun County IV)
- József Baracskai (MSZP Zala County Regional List)
- Dávid Dorosz (LMP Budapest Regional List)
- Zsolt Endrésik (Jobbik Borsod-Abaúj-Zemplén County Regional List)
- Ádám Ficsor (MSZP National List)
- Ferenc Gyurcsány (MSZP National List)
- Gábor Ivády (LMP National List)
- Benedek Jávor (LMP Budapest Regional List)
- Gergely Karácsony (LMP Budapest Regional List)
- István Kolber (MSZP Somogy County Regional List)
- Balázs Lenhardt (Jobbik National List)
- Csaba Molnár (MSZP Győr-Moson-Sopron County Regional List)
- Oszkár Molnár (Borsod-Abaúj-Zemplén County VIII)
- Lajos Oláh (MSZP Hajdú-Bihar County Regional List)
- Lajos Pősze (Jobbik Somogy County Regional List)
- Ernő Rozgonyi (Jobbik Fejér County Regional List)
- Gábor Scheiring (LMP National List)
- Rebeka Szabó (LMP National List)
- Tímea Szabó (LMP National List)
- László Szilágyi (LMP National List)
- Péter Szilágyi (LMP National List)
- Katalin Szili (MSZP Baranya County Regional List)
- Erika Szűcs (MSZP National List)
- Ágnes Vadai (MSZP National List)
- László Varju (MSZP Pest County Regional List)
- Iván Vitányi (MSZP National List)

== See also ==
- 2010 Hungarian parliamentary election
- Second Orbán Government
- List of Hungarian people
