= Michl =

Michl is a surname and male given name.

== Surname ==
Notable people with this surname include:

- Andreas Michl (born 1980), Austrian footballer
- František Michl (1901–1977), Czech graphic artist
- Günther Michl (1950–2025), German footballer
- Josef Michl (1939–2024), Czechoslovak-American chemist
- József Michl (born 1960), Hungarian politician
- Petr Michl (born 1970), Czech cross-country skier

== Given name ==
Notable people with this given name include:

- Michl Ebner (born 1952), Italian politician
- Michl Lang (1899–1979), German stage and film actor
