= Kenyeres =

Kenyeres is a Hungarian surname. Notable people with the surname include:

- Ábel Kenyeres (born 1994), Hungarian cyclist
- Fanni Kenyeres (born 1978), Hungarian handball player
- József Kenyeres (born 1955), Hungarian handball player

== See also ==
- Tamás Sáringer-Kenyeres (born 1961), Hungarian agronomist and politician
