= László Lukács (disambiguation) =

László Lukács (1850–1932) was a Hungarian politician who served as Prime Minister of the Kingdom of Hungary

László Lukács (Lukács László in the Western name order) may also refer to:

- László György Lukács (born 1983), Hungarian lawyer and politician serving in the Hungarian National Assembly
- László Lukács (politician, 1963) (born 1963), Hungarian politician who served in the Hungarian National Assembly
- László Lukács, a member of the Hungarian heavy metal and hard rock band Tankcsapda
