= László Vincze =

László Vincze may refer to:

- László Vincze (canoeist)
- László Vincze (politician) (1952–2026), Hungarian educator and politician
