= Zsiga =

Zsiga is both a given name and a surname. Notable people with the name include:

- Zsiga Pankotia (1930–1961), Hungarian-born British murderer
- Abigail Zsiga, English singer better known as Abigail
- Elizabeth Zsiga (born 1964), American linguist
- Ervin Zsiga (born 1991), Romanian footballer
- Marcell Zsiga (born 1979), Hungarian jurist
