= Hungarian Handball Federation =

Sports governing body in Hungary

Hungarian Handball Federation Hungarian: Magyar Kézilabda Szövetség MKSZ
- IOC nation: Hungary (HUN)
- Sport: Handball
- Other sports: Beach Handball; Wheelchair Handball
- Official website: www.mksz.hu

HISTORY
- Year of formation: 1933; 93 years ago

DEMOGRAPHICS
- Membership size: 20 Affiliated Members

AFFILIATIONS
- International federation: International Handball Federation (IHF)
- IHF member since: 1946; 80 years ago
- Continental association: European Handball Federation
- National Olympic Committee: Hungarian Olympic Committee

GOVERNING BODY
- President: Ferenc Ilyés

HEADQUARTERS
- Address: Budapest
- Country: Hungary
- Secretary General: Mr. András Novák (Hungary)

FINANCE
- Sponsors: Jysk; Müller; Adidas; Henkel; Molten Corporation; MTVA; MOL; Nemzeti Sport; Penny; K&H Bank; Teva Pharmaceutical Industries; TiPPMIX

The Hungarian Handball Federation (Hungarian: Magyar Kézilabda Szövetség, pronounced [ˈmɒɟɒr ˈkeːzilɒbdɒ ˈsøvɛt͡ʃːeːɡ], MKSZ) is the national handball federation in Hungary.

The Hungarian Handball Federation is a member of the European Handball Federation (EHF) and the International Handball Federation (IHF). Its headquarters are in Budapest. The federation organizes the Hungarian league (Hungarian: Nemzeti Bajnokság) for men and women, and administers the national handball teams for men and women.

Its president is Ferenc Ilyés, the vice president is Katalin Pálinger.

== Hosted tournaments ==
Men's

- 2022 European Men's Handball Championship (with Slovakia), January 13–30
- 2005 Men's Junior World Handball Championship
- 2013 Men's Youth World Handball Championship, August 10–23

Women's

- 1982 World Women's Handball Championship, December 2–12
- 1995 World Women's Handball Championship (with Austria), December 5–17
- 2004 European Women's Handball Championship, December 9–19
- 2014 European Women's Handball Championship (with Croatia), December 7–21
- 2024 European Women's Handball Championship (with Austria and Switzerland)
- 2001 Women's Junior World Handball Championship
- 2018 Women's Junior World Handball Championship
- 2009 Women's Junior European Handball Championship
- 2019 Women's Junior European Handball Championship
- 1992 Women's Youth European Handball Championship

Beach handball

- 2016 Beach Handball World Championships, Budapest, July 12–17

== Honours ==
Men's

- World Championship: Runner-up (1 time - 1986)
- Carpathian Trophy: Bronze medal - 1964, 1976

Women's

- Olympic Games: Runner-up (1 time - 2000); Third place (2 times - 1976, 1996)
- World Championship: Winner (1 time - 1965); Runner-up (4 times - 1957, 1982, 1995, 2003); Third place (4 times - 1971, 1975, 1978, 2005)
- European Championship: Winner (1 time - 2000); Third place (3 times - 1998, 2004, 2012)
- Carpathian Trophy: Silver medal - 1971, 1984, 2012; Bronze medal - 1970, 1975, 1981, 2011
- Møbelringen Cup: Silver medal - 2003

== Divisions ==
Men's

- Hungary men's national handball team
- Hungary men's national junior handball team
- Hungary men's national youth handball team
- Hungary national beach handball team

Women's

- Hungary women's national handball team
- Hungary women's national junior handball team
- Hungary women's national youth handball team
- Hungary women's national beach handball team

=== Current head coaches ===
As of 6 November 2022

Men's Team	Name
National team	(Spain) Chema Rodríguez
Junior team	(Hungary) László Sótonyi
Youth team	(Hungary) Krisztián Kárpáti
Beach handball team	(Hungary) István Gulyás
Beach handball junior team	(Hungary) Gergely Penszki
Beach handball youth team	(Hungary) Gergely Penszki

Women's Team	Name
National team	(Hungary) Vladimir Golovin
Junior team	(Hungary) Zoltán Szilágyi
Youth team	(Hungary) Beáta Bohus
Beach handball team	(Hungary) Bakó Botond
Beach handball junior team	(Hungary) Zoltán Pinizsi
Beach handball youth team	(Hungary) Zoltán Pinizsi

== Competitions ==
Magyar Kézilabda Szövetség is responsible for organising the following competitions:

=== Men's handball ===
- Nemzeti Bajnokság I (Tier 1)
- Nemzeti Bajnokság I/B (Tier 2) – two sections (East, West)
- Nemzeti Bajnokság II (Tier 3) – six sections (North-West, North, North-East, South-West, South, South-East)

=== Women's handball ===
- Nemzeti Bajnokság I (women) (Tier 1)
- Nemzeti Bajnokság I/B (women) (Tier 2) – two sections (East, West)
- Nemzeti Bajnokság II (women) (Tier 3) – six sections (North-West, North, North-East, South-West, South, South-East)

=== Cups ===
- Magyar Kupa – Men
- Szuperkupa – Men's Supercup
- Magyar Kupa (women) – Women
- Szuperkupa (women) – Women's Supercup

=== Beach handball ===
- Strandkézilabda Nemzeti Bajnokság (Tier 1)

== Presidency (2023) ==
- President: Ferenc Ilyés
- Vice president: Katalin Pálinger

=== Members of presidency ===
- László Nagy
- Erika Kirsner
- Timuzsin Schuch
- János Hajdu
- Beatrix Kökény
- Sándor Oláh
- Anita Görbicz
- dr. András Tállay
- Péter Csermely

== Presidents ==
- József Varga ( –1989)
- Péter Dobrovits (1989–1991)
- Imre Barcza (1991–1993)
- Lajos Pősze (1993–1996)
- András Benedek (1996–2003)
- István Kiss (2003–2009)
- László Sinka (2009–2011)
- Iván Vetési (2011–2015)
- Máté Kocsis (2015–2023)
- Ferenc Ilyés (2023–)

== Current sponsorships ==
- Nemzeti Sport - Official main sponsor
- Provident - Official sponsor (Platinum support)
- Henkel - Official sponsor (Gold support)
- MTVA - Official sponsor
- Jysk - Official sponsor
- Adidas - Official sponsor
- Molten - Official sponsor
- MOL - Official sponsor
- Sport Basica - Official sponsor
- Haluxvill - Official sponsor
- LBT - Official sponsor
- Penny - Official sponsor (Gold support)

== See also ==
- Hungarian handball clubs in European competitions
- Hungarian handball league system
