= Gyula Sáringer =

Gyula Sáringer (December 2, 1928 – February 17, 2009) was a Hungarian agronomist and entomologist. He was a member of the Hungarian Academy of Sciences (MTA). For some time he was a professor at the Institute for Plant Protection and Department of Entomology in the Georgikon Faculty of the University of Pannonia in Keszthely.

His son is MP Tamás Sáringer-Kenyeres.
