= Imre Szakács =

Hungarian jurist and politician (born 1957)

Member of the National Assembly
- In office 18 June 1998 – 5 May 2014

Personal details
- Born: 5 July 1957 (age 69) Budapest, Hungary
- Party: Fidesz (since 1994)
- Profession: jurist, politician

Dr. Imre Szakács (born July 5, 1957) is a Hungarian jurist and politician, member of the National Assembly (MP) for Győr (Győr-Moson-Sopron County Constituency II) from 1998 to 2014. He served as Parliamentary Secretary of State for Youth and Sport between January 1, 1999, and May 27, 2002.

== Biography ==
He finished Szabó József Secondary Technical School of Geology in Budapest in 1975. From 1975, he worked as a material procurement intern. He joined Belvárosi Vendéglátó-ipari Vállalat, a catering company in Budapest in 1980. He was also an active handball player in several sports clubs. He studied law at the Faculty of Law of Eötvös Loránd University in Budapest from 1981 until 1987. He was active in several of his shared businesses from 1983. He became chairman of Közvillszer Cooperative in 1986 and manager of Foton Ltd. in 1987. From 1991 to 1994 he worked as a registrar in the Mayor's Office in Győrzámoly. He has taught as a non-staff lecturer at Széchenyi István College for Advanced Studies since 1997 and has been a member of the Hungarian Law Association since 1996.

Szakács joined the Győr branch of Fidesz in June 1994, which he headed until 2003. Elected to serve on the party's Győr-Moson-Sopron County Board in 1995, he became deputy chairman of the board and later was elected president of the party's county branch in May 2001. A member of the committee on mandates, standing orders and incompatibility in the party's national board from 1998, he became alternate member of the committee after the general party elections in summer 2003. He ran as a candidate in the parliamentary election in spring 1994. He was elected to the General Assembly of Győr-Moson-Sopron County from the Fidesz party list in the 1994 local elections. From 1995 to 1998 he was deputy chairman of the county assembly.

In May 1998, he also secured a seat in Parliament, representing Győr. A mayoral candidate, he was re-elected on the county's assembly in the October 1998 local elections. He was Parliamentary Secretary of State for Youth and Sport from January 1, 1999, until May 27, 2002. As an individual candidate, he was elected incumbent MP in the 2002 parliamentary election. He is a member of the Committee on Constitution and Judicial Affairs. After the 2002 local elections, he was elected President of the General Assembly of Győr-Moson-Sopron County on 11 November 2002, replacing Ferenc Ivanics. He served in this capacity until 2014. He became an alternate member of the delegation of the Hungarian government to the Committee of Regions of the European Union in early April 2003. In the general elections held in 2006 and 2010, he was elected MP for Győr. He was elected member of the Constitutional, Judicial and Standing Orders Committee on May 30, 2006. In November 2014, Szakács was appointed Deputy Consul General at Consulate General of Hungary in New York City.
