= István Göndör =

Hungarian economist and politician (born 1950)

Member of the National Assembly
- In office 28 June 1994 – 5 May 2014

Personal details
- Born: 20 March 1950 (age 76) Kőszegszerdahely, Hungary
- Party: MSZMP (1971–89); MSZP (1989–2014); Together (2014–18)
- Profession: economist, politician

István Göndör (born 20 March 1950) is a Hungarian economist and politician, member of the National Assembly (MP) for Nagykanizsa (Zala County Constituency II) from 1994 to 1998 and from 2002 to 2010. He was also a Member of Parliament from the Zala County regional list from 1998 to 2002 and the national list of the Hungarian Socialist Party (MSZP) from 2010 to 2014.

== Profession ==
Göndör was born in Kőszegszerdahely on 20 March 1950. He attended elementary school in Türje. He finished his secondary studies at the I. István Economic Technical School in Budapest in 1968. He earned his degree of business economy at the Financial and Accounting College (today a faculty of the Budapest Business School) in 1971. Following that he worked for the Central Transdanubian Gas Supply Company (Közép-dunántúli Gázszolgáltató Vállalat) and its legal successor Kögáz Ltd.

Göndör married trade seller Mária Gugi in 1973; they have three children, Gábor (b. January 1976), Réka (b. December 1976), and István (b. 1988).

== Political career ==
Göndör joined the Hungarian Socialist Workers' Party (MSZMP) in 1971. He was a prominent trade unionist in the 1970s. He was involved in the Mining Trade Union. He was a member of its economics committee from 1980 to 1988. He was a founding member and bursar of the Kögáz Engineering Labor Union. Göndör participated in the reformist movement during the regime change; he was one of the organizers of the Round Table Talks in his residence Nagykanizsa. In the spring of 1989, he had an important role in the democratization of the Zala County branch committee of the Socialist Workers' Party. Göndör joined the Hungarian Socialist Party (MSZP) in October 1989, and was elected chairman of its local branch in Nagykanizsa, serving in this capacity until 2003.

He was a member of the local representative body of Nagykanizsa between 1990 and 1994. He was elected a Member of Parliament for Nagykanizsa during the 1994 parliamentary election, defeating incumbent MP Attila Tarnóczky (MDF). He worked in the Economic Committee during the 1994–98 parliamentary term. He was defeated by László Zakó (FKGP) in Nagykanizsa constituency in the 1998 parliamentary election, but became an MP via the Socialist Party's Zala County regional list. Göndör was involved in the Economic Committee (and its Subcommittee of Energy) and the Defense Committee. In the 2002 parliamentary election, he gained an individual mandate for Nagykanizsa constituency again, when defeated Péter Cseresnyés, the joint candidate of Fidesz and MDF. He continued his work in both parliamentary committees in the next term. Göndör defeated Cseresnyés again in the 2006 parliamentary election. He worked in the Economic and Information Technology Committee from 2006 to 2010, and chaired its Public Procurement Subcommittee between 2007 and 2010.

His name did not appear in the Socialist Party's Zala County regional list and himself did not run in Nagykanizsa during the 2010 parliamentary election; however he secured a mandate from his party's national list. After a brief work in the Defense and Law Enforcement Committee, he was involved in the Parliamentary Immunity, Conflicts of Interest, Disciplinary and Credentials Committee from 2010 to 2014. He also served as one of the recorders of the National Assembly in that parliamentary term. Göndör announced he will leave the Socialist Party and join the Together – Party for a New Era in October 2013. He maintained his mandate and remained in the MSZP parliamentary group until the 2014 parliamentary election, when he ran as a joint candidate of the Unity parties and only came to the third place after Cseresnyés (Fidesz) and Zakó (Jobbik). He joined Together in June 2014 and became a member of its political advisory board.
