= Lajos Pősze =

Hungarian politician (born 1954)

Member of the National Assembly
- In office 14 May 2010 – 5 May 2014

Personal details
- Born: 27 September 1954 (age 71) Debrecen, Hungary
- Party: MDF, FKGP, Jobbik
- Profession: politician

Lajos Pősze (born 27 September 1954) is a Hungarian business executive, sports official and politician, who was a member of the National Assembly (MP) from 2010 to 2014.

== Life ==
Lajos Pősze was born in Debrecen on 27 September 1954. His father was headmaster of the Grammar School and Student Home of the Debrecen Reformed College. Pősze earned a degree of mathematics at the Kossuth Lajos University (present-day University of Debrecen) in 1978. He entered administrative career and worked for the Public Administration Computer Service (ÁSzSz) within the Hungarian Central Statistical Office (KSH) from 1978 to 1991. He was commercial manager and deputy-director of the institution since 1989.

== Political career ==
Pősze was a founding member of the Hungarian Democratic Forum (MDF) since 1987. He participated in the party's campaign in the 1990 parliamentary election. Pősze served as CEO of the state organization Szerencsejáték Ltd. from 1991 to 1993. In the time of his directorate, regular prize draws were abolished and full accumulation in the lottery was introduced. During the sharp debates within the party in the spring of 1993, Pősze supported István Csurka against Prime Minister József Antall, Pősze was dismissed from his position and he quit the party. Pősze filed a labor lawsuit, which he won, so he was reinstated in his position in March 1994, but he was soon dismissed again, now within the regular labor law framework. Pősze also served as President of the Hungarian Handball Federation (MKSZ) from 1993 to 1996.

In the subsequent years, Pősze worked as a campaign expert to the Independent Smallholders, Agrarian Workers and Civic Party (FKGP), but did not join the party itself. His name appeared on the party's national list during the 1998 parliamentary election.

Before the 2010 parliamentary election, Pősze was nominated by the far-right Jobbik as the party's candidate for the position of Minister of the Prime Minister's Office ("Minister of Chancellery"). He ran as a candidate in Kispest (Budapest Constituency XXVIII) in the election, where he came to the third place after Richárd Tarnai (Fidesz) and Sándor Burány (MSZP). Nevertheless, Pősze obtained a parliamentary seat via the Jobbik regional list of Somogy County (even though he had never acted in the county). Pősze was deputy leader of the Jobbik caucus from May to July 2010. Pősze served as vice-chairman of the Economic and IT Committee from May to December 2010. He was a member of the Committee on the Court of Auditors and the Budget from December 2010 to May 2014 and the Committee on Constitutional Affairs, Justice and Home Affairs from September 2011 to May 2014. He also worked in the ad hoc committee, which investigated the ethnic tensions at Gyöngyöspata between 2011 and 2012 and the eavesdropping scandal affecting several European countries from 2013 to 2014.

Pősze was replaced as deputy leader of the caucus on 18 July 2010, after an interview with him in Magyar Nemzet, in which he stated that "it is unfortunate that people are now associating the party [Jobbik] with the Magyar Gárda and György Budaházy". Pősze was expelled from the Jobbik parliamentary group on 12 December 2010. The party leadership also called for him to resign, but he refused and remained an independent MP until the end of the parliamentary term in 2014. Pősze called the Jobbik as "primitive", "Bolshevik" and "racist" after his expulsion. According to Gábor Vona, the leader of Jobbik, Pősze has permanently moved away from the party's ideology.

On January 19, 2011, Pősze announced that he wanted to "create a liberated, cultured, patriotic movement out of dissatisfied Jobbik members and the former MDF base" and address his followers on a "patriotic basis". Recruitment events of his movement, called "National Café", were held in Kaposvár, Debrecen, Budapest and Szentes. Pro-Jobbik supporters and members of the HVIM led by László Toroczkai protested against him in the latter place on 11 February 2011, Pősze was evacuated from the scene by the police. In the subsequent years, Pősze was a vocal critic of Jobbik and voted for the Fidesz–KDNP government bills in a number of cases. He was the only opposition MP, who voted in favor of the adoption of the new constitution of Hungary on 18 April 2011. After the 2014 parliamentary election, Pősze worked as a CEO coordinator of the state company National Toll Payment Services PLC (NÚSZ) since early 2015. Pro-Jobbik news portal Alfahír believed that the government had thus paid for his "services" for supporting the government's policies and his active and vocal participation in the 2014 campaign against Jobbik.
