= Ferenc Obreczán =

Hungarian politician

Member of the National Assembly
- In office 14 May 2010 – 5 May 2014

Personal details
- Born: 21 January 1950 (age 76) Verseg, Hungary
- Party: Fidesz (since 1994)
- Profession: politician

Ferenc Obreczán (born January 21, 1950) is a Hungarian politician, member of the National Assembly (MP) from Fidesz Pest County Regional List between 2010 and 2014.

Obreczán became deputy mayor of his birthplace, Verseg in 2003. He was elected general secretary of the National Alliance of Hungarian Farmers (MAGOSZ) in 2004. He participated in the organizing of farmers' demonstration between February and March 2005. He became a member of the General Assembly of Pest County during the 2006 local elections.

He was a member of the Committee on Agriculture from May 14, 2010 to May 5, 2014.
