= Imre Puskás =

Hungarian jurist and politician

Member of the National Assembly
- In office 14 May 2010 – 5 May 2014

Personal details
- Born: July 20, 1966 (age 59) Szekszárd, Hungary
- Party: Fidesz (since 1998)
- Profession: jurist, politician

Imre Puskás (born July 20, 1966) is a Hungarian jurist and politician, member of the National Assembly (MP) from Fidesz Tolna County Regional List from 2010 to 2014.

He joined Fidesz in 1998. Puskás was elected President of the General Assembly of Tolna County in 2006. He was also a deputy mayor of Bátaszék for a short time in that year. He was a member of the Committee on Cultural and Press Affairs from May 14, 2010 to June 18, 2012. He was elected Vice Chairman of the Committee on Audit Office and Budget on June 18, 2012. He worked in the Constitutional, Judicial and Standing Orders Committee between March 13, 2013 and May 13, 2013. In 2014, he was appointed as Deputy State Secretariat of Cultural Heritage.
