= Attila Szedlák =

Hungarian politician

Member of the National Assembly
- In office 14 May 2010 – 5 May 2014

Personal details
- Born: 26 October 1969 (age 56) Veszprém, Hungary
- Party: Fidesz
- Profession: politician

Attila Szedlák (born 26 October 1969) is a Hungarian politician, member of the National Assembly (MP) from Fidesz Veszprém County Regional List from 2010 to 2014. He was elected Mayor of Litér on 20 October 2002, serving in this capacity until 10 November 2019, after the local election was annulled and repeated upon Szedlák's complaint.

Szedlák was a member of the Committee on Employment and Labour from 14 May 2010 to 5 May 2014 and Committee on Local Government and Regional Development from 14 February 2011 to 5 May 2014.

Szedlák was appointed general-director of the Hungarian Chamber of Agriculture (NAK) in May 2020.
