= Bence Stágel =

Hungarian politician (born 1978)

Member of the National Assembly
- In office 13 September 2010 – 31 May 2013

Personal details
- Born: 21 December 1978 (age 47) Budapest, Hungary
- Party: KDNP
- Profession: jurist, politician

Dr. Bence Stágel (born 21 December 1978) is a Hungarian jurist and politician, member of the National Assembly (MP) from Fidesz–KDNP National List between 2010 and 2013.

He was elected MP from the party's National List in September 2010, replacing Pál Schmitt, who became President of Hungary in August 2010. Stágel served as a member of the Committee on Youth, Social, Family and Housing Affairs from 4 October 2010 and Committee of National Cohesion between 1 January 2011 and 4 March 2013. He was appointed one of the recorders of the National Assembly on 22 February 2011. He resigned from his parliamentary seat for personal reasons on 31 May 2013. He was replaced by Balázs Hidvéghi (Fidesz).
