= József Baracskai =

Hungarian politician (born 1973)

Member of the National Assembly
- In office 14 May 2010 – 5 May 2014

Personal details
- Born: 14 June 1973 (age 53) Zalaegerszeg, Hungary
- Party: MSZP (2002–2011); DK (2011– )
- Occupation: Engineer, Politician

József Baracskai (born 14 June 1973) is a Hungarian politician and engineer. Since 2010, he has served as the mayor of Zalaszentgrót. He was also a Member of Parliament (MP) between 2010 and 2014. Baracskai was a member of the Hungarian Socialist Party (MSZP) until 2011, when he became a founding member of the Democratic Coalition (DK), led by former prime minister Ferenc Gyurcsány.

== Profession ==
József Baracskai was born in Zalaegerszeg on 14 June 1973. He attended elementary school in Zalaszentgrót before graduating from the Ságvári Endre (present-day Kölcsey Ferenc) Secondary Grammar School of Zalaegerszeg in 1991. In 1996, he attained a degree in technical computer engineering from the Széchenyi István College in Győr in 1996.

== Political career ==
Baracskai joined the Hungarian Socialist Party (MSZP) in 2002. He was a member of the local representative body of Zalaszentgrót between 2002 and 2010, where he presided over committees on tourism and the environment. He has served as prefect of the village of Csáford since 2003, which lies in the administrative area of Zalaszentgrót. He became President of the Zala County branch of the MSZP in 2004, retaining the position until 2011. Baracskai was also a member of the Zala County Assembly from 2006 to 2010.

During the 2010 parliamentary election, Baracskai was elected a Member of Parliament via the MSZP regional list of Zala County. He was involved in the Committee on Sustainable Development between May and October 2010, the Committee on Human Rights, Minorities, Civil, and Religious Affairs between 2010 and 2011, and the Health Committee between 2011 and 2014. Baracskai was elected mayor of Zalaszentgrót in the 2010 local elections, defeating incumbent mayor József Császár. He was re-elected in the 2014 and 2019.

The 2010 parliamentary election led to the deepening of political divides within the Hungarian Socialist Party, and Baracskai left to join the Democratic Coalition Party of Hungary. Formally, Baracskai was an independent MP between 2011 and 2014.
