= Attila Kiss =

Hungarian politician (born 1968)

Member of the National Assembly
- In office 15 May 2002 – 5 May 2014

Personal details
- Born: 22 April 1968 (age 58) Hajdúböszörmény, Hungary
- Party: Fidesz (since 2003)
- Children: 2
- Profession: politician

Attila Kiss (born 22 April 1968) is a Hungarian politician, member of the National Assembly (MP) for Hajdúböszörmény (Hajdú-Bihar County Constituency IX) between 2006 and 2014. He was also a Member of Parliament from Fidesz Hajdú Bihar County Regional List between 2002 and 2006.

He ran in the local election in December 1994. He was elected representative of Fidesz and deputy mayor in the local elections in Hajdúböszörmény in October 1998. At the 2002 parliamentary elections he secured a seat as a non-party candidate from the joint Hajdú-Bihar County Regional List of Fidesz and the Hungarian Democratic Forum (MDF). Since 2003 he has been the head of the local branch of Fidesz - Hungarian Civic Union (Fidesz-MPP). In the parliamentary elections held in 2006, he was elected from Hajdúböszörmény, Hajdú-Bihar County. He had been member of the Committee on Culture and the Media since 30 May 2006. During the Hungarian local elections in 2006 he was elected Mayor of Hajdúböszörmény, he was re-elected in 2010, 2014 and 2019. In 2024, he lost the election, and the people of Hajdúböszörmény elected Éva Göröghné Bocskai instead.

== Personal life ==
He is married and has two children.
