= Barnabás Bödecs =

Hungarian politician

Member of the National Assembly
- In office 14 May 2010 – 4 December 2012

Personal details
- Born: 20 February 1962 (age 64) Győr, Hungary
- Party: MZP (1990); Jobbik (until 2012)
- Profession: auditor, politician

Barnabás Bödecs (born 20 February 1962) is a Hungarian auditor and former politician, who was the member of the National Assembly (MP) between 2010 and 2012, sitting as a politician of the far-right Jobbik.

== Profession ==
Bödecs was born in Győr on 20 February 1962. He graduated from the local Révai Miklós Gymnasium in 1980. He completed his higher education at the Faculty of Industry of the College of Finance and Accounting in Zalaegerszeg, and then between 1981 and 1985 at the Faculty of Industry, Department of Transportation of the Budapest University of Economics. He obtained a Master of Science degree in economics in 1985. He obtained a tax expert certificate in 1994 and a certified public accountant certificate in 1997 at the postgraduate training courses of the Ministry of Finance. He is a member of the Hungarian Chamber of Auditors.

He worked as a tram driver at the Budapest Transport Company from 1984 to 1985. He was a financial consultant at Volánbusz between 1985 and 1989. He worked at Ernst and Young Hungary Kft. as an audit team leader from 1989 to 1992, and in 1991 he was a tax consultant assistant at Süd-Ost Treuhand AG in Vienna. Between 1992 and 1996 he worked as a sole proprietor, as an audit assistant. Since 1997 he has been an auditor and co-owner of FAL-CON AUDIT Kft.

== Public life ==
He has been involved in public life as a civil environmentalist since the 1990s. He was a member of the Green Party of Hungary (MZP) for a brief time in 1990. He was a member of the Reflex Environmental Protection Association (seated in Győr) in the first half of the 1990s. He served as president of the HuMuSz Waste Workers' Association from 1996 to 2004. He was the vice president of the Hungarian Transport Club from 2005 to 2010. He has been the president of the Cuha Valley Bakony Railway Association since 2009.

Bödecs was elected a Member of Parliament via the national list of Jobbik in the 2010 Hungarian parliamentary election. He was a member of the parliament's Sustainable Development Committee from 2010 to 2012. Bödecs resigned from his parliamentary seat on 4 December 2012. He explained his decision with personal reasons. According to press reports, he decided to resign due to fellow Jobbik MP Márton Gyöngyösi's scandalous parliamentary speech in which he intended to list politicians of Jewish origin.
