= Tamás Básthy =

Hungarian agronomist and politician (born 1943)

Member of the National Assembly
- In office 18 June 1998 – 5 May 2014

Mayor of Kőszeg
- In office 1990 – 20 October 2002
- Succeeded by: Ferenc Kuntner

Personal details
- Born: 17 December 1943 (age 82) Szombathely, Hungary
- Party: KDNP (1990–1997; since 2006); MKDSZ (1997–2006)
- Children: 4
- Profession: agronomist

Tamás Básthy (born 17 December 1943) is a Hungarian agronomist and politician, who served as mayor of Kőszeg between 1990 and 2002. He was elected member of the National Assembly (MP) for Kőszeg (Vas County Constituency III) in the 1998 parliamentary election.

== Early life ==
Básthy finished Nagy Lajos Secondary Grammar School in his hometown in 1962. He obtained horticultural technician's qualifications at the Agricultural College of Körmend in 1964. He graduated as an agriculturalist from the Mosonmagyaróvár College Faculty of the University of Agriculture in 1971. He obtained an advanced diploma in business management from the same higher educational institution in 1983. He did his one-year internship in Jurisics Agricultural Cooperative of Horvátzsidány in 1964. He worked as an agronomist for the Kőszeg Hegyalja Agricultural Cooperative from 1965 to 1988. He was the manager of the Szombathely Branch of Agrobank from 1988 to 1990. He has been the president of the Kőszeg Sports Club since 1992. He has been a member of the Chamber of Agriculture since 1995.

== Political career ==
He joined the Christian Democratic People's Party (KDNP) in July 1990 and presided over the party's Vas County branch from 1994 to 1997. He was expelled from the Christian Democratic People's Party on 11 July 1997, after that joined the Fidesz-ally Hungarian Christian Democratic Alliance (MKDSZ) and became president of its Vas County organisation on 30 August 1997.

He ran as a candidate of the Patriotic Election Coalition in the 1990 parliamentary election. In 1990 he was elected mayor of Kőszeg, a position which he managed to retain in the next three local elections. He had been a member of the representative body of Kőszeg and the General Assembly of Vas County for 16 years. He ran unsuccessfully in the 1994 parliamentary election and only managed to secure a seat in Parliament in 1998, as a candidate of Fidesz (representing Kőszeg, Constituency III, Vas County).

In the first round of the 2002 parliamentary election he secured a seat as an individual candidate by winning 57.04% of the votes in Kőszeg. He was a member of the Internal Security Committee. He ran for the position of mayor for the fourth time in the local elections on 20 October 2002, this time unsuccessfully. He served as Vice President of the General Assembly of Vas County, Chairman of the Legal and Standing Orders Committee and Deputy Chairman of the Procurements Committee from 2002 to 2006. During the parliamentary election in 2006 he became MP for Kőszeg again. He was appointed a member of the Defence and Internal Security Committee on 30 May 2006.

== Personal life ==
He is married and has four children.
