= Attila Márton =

Hungarian politician (born 1963)

Member of the National Assembly
- In office 18 June 1998 – 5 May 2014

Personal details
- Born: 14 March 1963 (age 63) Debrecen, Hungary
- Party: Fidesz (since 1994)
- Profession: politician

Attila Márton (born March 14, 1963) is a Hungarian politician, a member of the National Assembly (MP) for Hajdúszoboszló (Hajdú-Bihar County Constituency VII) from 2002 to 2014. He was also a Member of Parliament from Fidesz Hajdú Bihar County Regional List between 1998 and 2002.

== Biography ==
He finished the car mechanics course at Landler Jenő Secondary Technical School at Debrecen in 1981. He graduated as a traffic process engineer with IT and business specialisation from the College of Transport and Telecommunications of Győr in 1984. He received a university degree in IT systems analysis in Debrecen in 1991 having accomplished the joint programme of Kossuth Lajos University of Debrecen. From 1984 he worked as a logistics manager. From 1988 until his election as MP in 1998 he worked in different positions for the Hajdúszoboszló headquarters of the Trans-Tisza Gas Supply Company in the field of business information technology including systems host, project manager, then senior IT staff. He has been active as a sports pilot since 1979 and has been on the board of the Hungarian Association of Aviation since 1998. He presided over the Association from 2000 to 2002.

=== Political career ===
Márton started his political career in December 1993 upon the invitation of Fidesz. He ran in the national and local elections for the first time in 1994. He has been a member of Fidesz since May 1994 and a member of the Hajdú-Bihar County Board since 1996. In the 1998 general election he secured a mandate from the Hajdú-Bihar County Regional List of Fidesz. He became a member of the Economic Committee in the same year and chaired the Ad Hoc Subcommittee Examining the Operation of Dunaferr Company.

In the 2002 election he secured a seat as an individual MP representing Hajdúszoboszló, Constituency VII, Hajdú-Bihar County. In the general election held in 2006, he was elected MP again. He was appointed a member of the Economic and Information Technology Committee. He defended his mandate in the 2010 parliamentary election.
