= Verseg =

- Village (község)
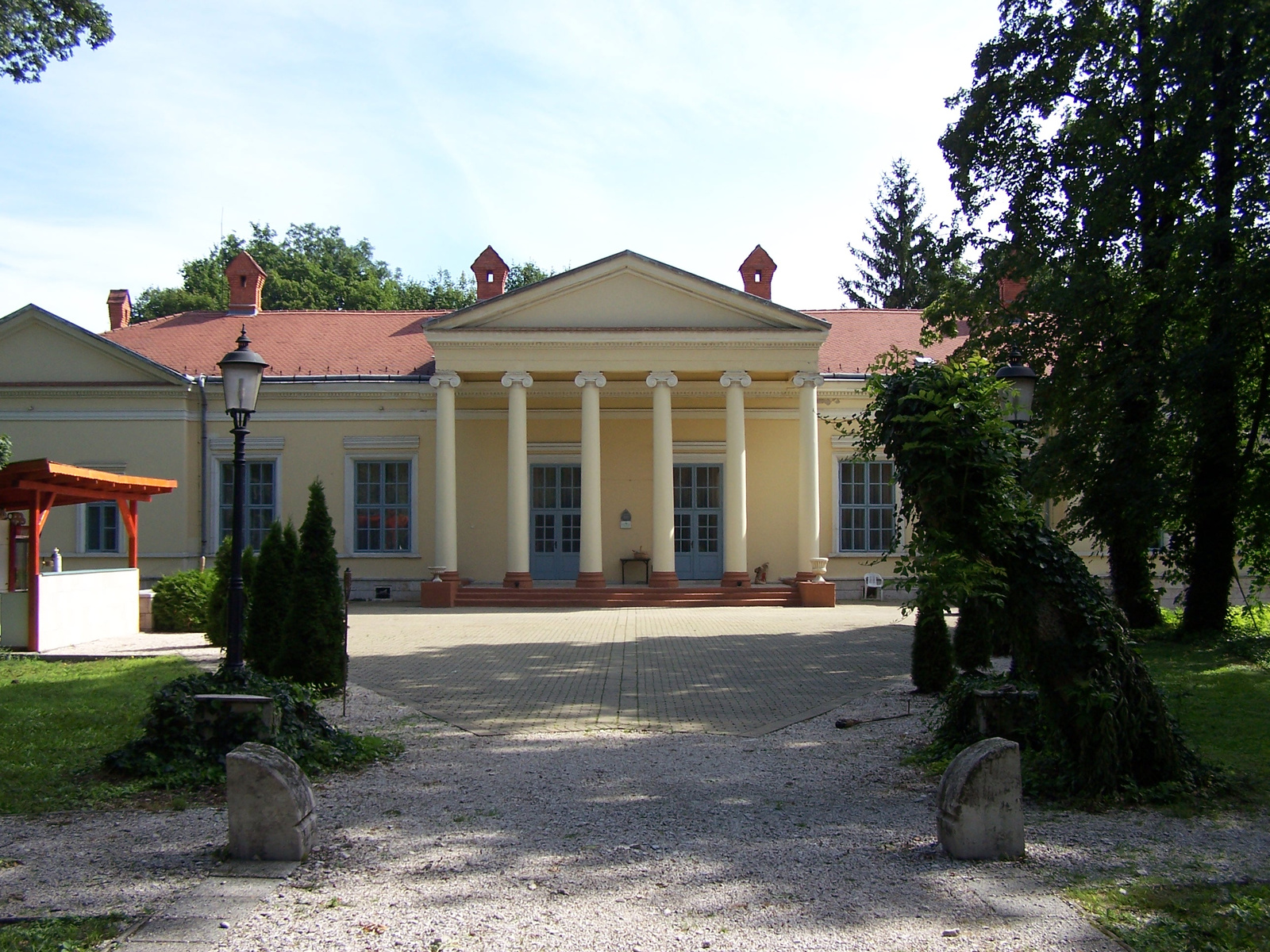
- Podmaniczky mansion in Verseg

- Coat of arms

- Location within Hungary
- Coordinates: 47°42′22″N 19°33′02″E
- Country: Hungary
- Region: Central Hungary
- County: Pest County
- Subregion: Aszódi

Government
  - Mayor: Józsa Csaba (Fidesz-KDNP)

Area
  - Total: 29.57 km^{2} (11.42 sq mi)

Population (2022)
  - Total: 1,284
  - Density: 43.42/km^{2} (112.5/sq mi)
- Postal code: 2174
- Area code: 28
- ksh_code: 09441
- Website: www.verseg.hu

Verseg is a village in Pest County, Central Hungary Region, Hungary.
