= István Román =

Hungarian politician

Member of the National Assembly
- In office 14 May 2010 – 5 May 2014

Personal details
- Born: 10 August 1975 (age 50) Ibrány, Hungary
- Party: Fidesz (since 1994)
- Profession: politician

István Román (born 10 August 1975) is a Hungarian politician, member of the National Assembly (MP) from Fidesz Szabolcs-Szatmár-Bereg County Regional List between 2010 and 2014.

Román was elected vice president of the General Assembly of Szabolcs-Szatmár-Bereg County in 2009. He was a member of the Economic and Information Technology Committee from 14 May 2010 to 5 May 2014. He was appointed deputy secretary of state for agricultural vocational training in June 2014. He held the position until 1 August 2017, when he was made director of the Szabolcs-Szatmár-Bereg County Government Office.
