= Imre Bodó =

Hungarian politician

Member of the National Assembly
- In office 19 November 2007 – 5 May 2014

Personal details
- Born: 8 May 1962 (age 63) Szeged, Hungary
- Party: Fidesz
- Children: 2
- Profession: politician

Imre Bodó (born 8 May 1962) is a Hungarian politician, member of the National Assembly (MP) from Csongrád County Regional List from 2007 to 2010. He represented Szeged (Constituency I) between 14 May 2010 and 5 May 2014. He was a member of the Committee on Agriculture between 2007 and 2010 and Committee on Sustainable Development from 2010 to 2012.

He served as the mayor of Tiszasziget from 1998 to 2014.

== Personal life ==
He is married and has two children.
