= Endre Spaller =

Hungarian sociologist (born 1977)

Member of the National Assembly
- In office 14 May 2010 – 31 January 2014

Personal details
- Born: 6 September 1977 (age 49) Oradea, Romania
- Party: KDNP
- Profession: sociologist, politician

Endre Spaller (born September 6, 1977) is a Hungarian sociologist and politician, member of the National Assembly (MP) from Fidesz–KDNP Budapest Regional List between 2010 and 2014.

== Biography ==
Spaller was born in Oradea, Romania into an ethnic Hungarian family. He grew up in Hungary.

He became a member of the General Assembly of Angyalföld (District XIII, Budapest) in 2002. He was elected MP from the party's list in the 2010 parliamentary election, after he failed individual seat in Angyalföld against József Tóth (MSZP). He served as a member of the Committee on Consumer Protection and Committee on Employment and Labour since May 14, 2010. He was appointed one of the recorders of the National Assembly on September 30, 2013. Spaller became President of the National Innovation Office (NIH), as a result he resigned from his parliamentary seat on January 31, 2014. His parliamentary seat remained vacant until the 2014 parliamentary election.
