= Endre Kukorelly =

Hungarian writer, poet and journalist

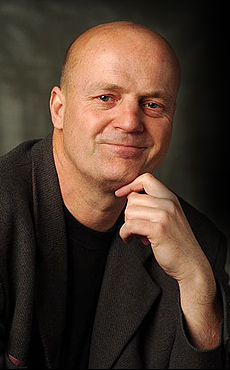

Member of the National Assembly
- In office 14 May 2010 – 23 September 2012

Personal details
- Born: 26 April 1951 (age 74) Budapest, Hungary
- Party: LMP
- Profession: writer, poet

Endre Kukorelly (born 26 April 1951) is a Hungarian writer, poet and journalist. He is a teacher of the Hungarian University of Fine Arts. He was also an editor of the Magyar Narancs.

== Political career ==
Kukorelly is a founding member of the Politics Can Be Different (LMP). He ran for an individual seat in Szentendre, Pest County Constituency XI during the 2010 parliamentary election. He became a member of the National Assembly (MP) from the first place of LMP's Pest County Regional List on May 14, 2010. He worked in the Committee on Sports and Tourism. He resigned from his mandate due to lack of confidence on September 23, 2012. He was replaced by Szilvia Lengyel on October 8, 2012.

== Works ==
- A valóság édessége (poems, 1984, Magvető Könyvkiadó, Budapest)
- Manière (poems, 1986, Magvető Könyvkiadó, Budapest)
- Én senkivel sem üldögélek (poems, 1989, Pannon Könyvkiadó, Budapest)
- A Memória-part (novel, 1990, Magvető Könyvkiadó, Budapest, Book Of The Year Award; translated into five languages between 1996 and 2000)
- Azt mondja aki él (prose poems, 1991, Jelenkor Irodalmi és Művészeti Kiadó, Pécs)
- Egy gyógynövény-kert (selected poems, 1993, Magvető Könyvkiadó, Budapest; translated into Portuguese in 1997)
- Napos terület (prose poems, 1994)
- Budapest – Papírváros (photo gallery book, 1994, with photos of Károly Gink)
- Mintha már túl sokáig állna (poems, 1995, Budapest)
- Kedvenxc (essays, 1996; translated into German in 1999)
- H.Ö.L.D.E.R.L.I.N. (poem cycle, 1999)
- Három 100 darab (novelette, Jelenkor Irodalmi és Művészeti kiadó, Pécs, 1999)
- Rom: A Szovjetónió története (novel, 2000)
- Kicsit majd kevesebbet járkálok (writings, 2001)
- TündérVölgy, avagy Az emberi szív rejtelmeiről (novel, 2003, harmadik kiadás 2007)
- Samunadrág (poems for children, 2005, Kalligram Könyvkiadó, Budapest)
- Rom. A komonizmus története (novel, 2006, enlarged edition)
- Ezer és 3 avagy A nőkben rejlő szív (novel, 2009, Kalligram Könyvkiadó, Budapest)
- Mennyit hibázok, te úristen (Kalligram Könyvkiadó, 2010)
