= Szilvia Lengyel =

Hungarian politician and engineer

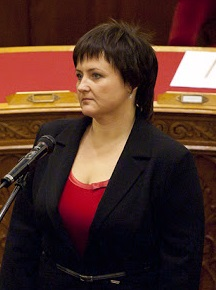

Member of the National Assembly
- In office 8 October 2012 – 5 May 2014

Personal details
- Born: 1971 (age 54–55) Debrecen, Hungary
- Party: LMP
- Profession: agrarian engineer

Szilvia Lengyel (born 1971) is a Hungarian agrarian engineer and politician, member of the National Assembly (MP) from Politics Can Be Different (LMP) Pest County Regional List from 2012 to 2014.

She became a Member of Parliament on October 8, 2012, replacing Endre Kukorelly who resigned in September 2012. Formerly the LMP's Pest County Board, led by Lengyel, withdrew its confidence from Kukorelly. Szilvia Lengyel was a member of the Committee on Sports and Tourism.
