= Zsolt Horváth (politician, born 1964) =

Hungarian politician (born 1964)

Member of the National Assembly
- In office 18 June 1998 – 5 May 2014

Personal details
- Born: 22 May 1964 (age 61) Szeremle, Hungary
- Party: Fidesz (since 1989)
- Spouse: Dr Barbara Balázs
- Children: Csege
- Profession: physician, dentist, politician

Zsolt Horváth (born 22 May 1964) is a Hungarian physician, dentist and politician, former member of the National Assembly (MP) for Kecskemét (Bács-Kiskun County Constituency II) between 1998 and 2014. Horváth acquired offshore firms before and after leaving the National Assembly, per the 2016 Panama Papers leak.

== Education ==
Horváth finished Katona József Secondary School of Kecskemét in 1982. He graduated with an MD degree from the Faculty of General Medicine of the Semmelweis University of Medicine in 1989 and studied in the United States from 1989 to 1990. In 1994 he graduated from The Faculty of Dentistry of the Semmelweis University.

== Career ==
From 1990 onward Horváth worked for the Department of Orthopaedics of the Bács-Kiskun County Hospital and from 1997 to 1998 as a dentist for the Town Clinic of Kecskemét. He has been a member of the Hungarian Medical Chamber since 1989 and was elected representative to its national assembly in 1998. He graduated from the University of Economics and Public Administration of Budapest in 2002.

=== Politics ===
Horváth joined the Fidesz party in 1989 and became deputy head of the Kecskemét organisation of the party in 1997. He has been a member of the Bács-Kiskun County Board since 1998.

From June 1998 to May 2014 he was a member of Hungary’s National Assembly; In 1998, he was elected as an individual candidate in the parliamentary elections representing Constituency II, Kecskemét, Bács-Kiskun County. He was spokesperson for and a member of the presidium of the parliamentary faction until 2000. From February to May 2000 he headed the Office of Social Policy of Prime Minister Viktor Orbán. He served as Parliamentary Secretary for Health from June 2000 to May 2001 in the course of the reshuffle of the Cabinet. He was deputy parliamentary faction leader of the Fidesz from June 2001 to May 2002.

During the April 2002 parliamentary elections Horváth was elected incumbent as an individual candidate from his Kecskemét constituency. He became a member of the Health Committee in May 2002. He was elected a member of the Kecskemét Assembly, then deputy mayor of the city with county status in the autumn local elections. in the 2006 and 2010 elections he was elected MP for Kecskemét. He was a member of the National Assembly’s health committee until 2014.

== Personal life ==
He is married. His wife is Dr Barbara Balázs. Their son is Csege Horváth.

Horváth was among those implicated in the Panama Papers scandal for founding offshore investment companies in the Seychelles. In October 2013, as a member of the National Assembly, he became director of the offshore company Excelle Media International Ltd., not mentioned in his 2014 declaration of financial interests to the Hungarian parliament.

In September 2014, Horváth became director of Mayer & Collins Trading Company Ltd. with Hungarian businessman Imre Kökényesi as co-director of both companies, which manufacture and sell toys in China, Hong Kong and Hungary, and are registered with the law firm Mossack Fonseca. In March 2015, Mossack Fonseca identified Horváth as a politically exposed person.
