= Vilmos Szabó =

Hungarian educator and politician

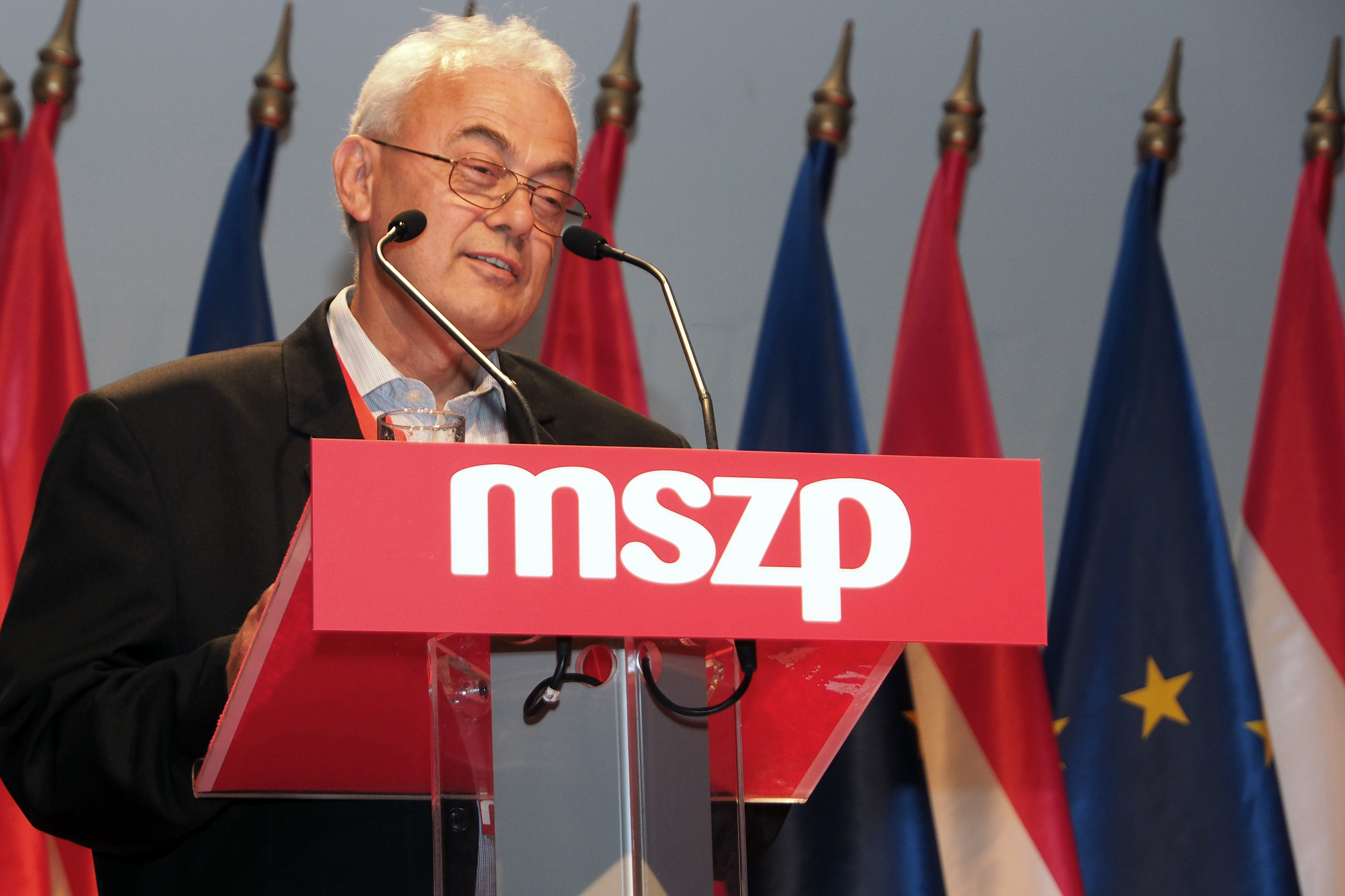
- Vilmos Szabó in 2014

Member of the National Assembly
- In office 18 June 1998 – 5 May 2014

Personal details
- Born: 17 July 1952 (age 73) Sarud, Hungary
- Party: MSZMP (1982–89); MSZP (1989– )
- Profession: educator, politician

Vilmos Szabó (born 17 July 1952) is a Hungarian educator and Hungarian Socialist Party (MSZP) politician, member of the National Assembly (MP) between 1998 and 2014. He served as Secretary of State for Foreign Affairs from 2009 to 2010.

== Studies and profession ==
Szabó was born in Sarud, Heves County on 17 July 1952. He finished his secondary studies in Debrecen in 1970. He attended Kossuth Lajos University (today Debrecen University) from 1970 to 1975, where he earned a degree of German-language and historian teacher. He was an assistant lecturer at the Budapest Technical University (BME) from 1976 to 1988.

== Political career ==
Szabó joined the Hungarian Socialist Workers' Party (MSZMP) in 1982. Later he became secretary of its Újbuda (11th District of Budapest) branch. He was a founding member of the Hungarian Socialist Party (MSZP) in 1989. He was a member of the local representative body of Újbuda from 1990 to 1994. He was appointed chairman of the MSZP local branch in Újbuda in 1994. He was a member of the General Assembly of Budapest between 1994 and 1998. He functioned as Head of the MSZP's International Secretariat from 1994 to 2002.

He was elected a Member of Parliament via his party's national list in the 1998 parliamentary election. He became a member of the Committee on Foreign Affairs, continuing his work there until 2014. He was re-elected MP in 2002 and 2006. He served as Political Secretary of State in the Prime Minister's Office between 2002 and 2006, in the cabinets of Péter Medgyessy and Ferenc Gyurcsány. He served as Secretary of State for Foreign Affairs from 2009 to 2010 under minister Péter Balázs in the government of Gordon Bajnai. He was deputy leader of the MSZP parliamentary group from 2010 to 2011. He was appointed Chairman of the Board of Trustees of Mihály Táncsics Foundation in 2011. He was a member of the Parliamentary Committee for National Communion between 2011 and 2014. He was deputy leader of the Hungarian delegation to the Parliamentary Assembly of the Council of Europe between 2010 and 2014.
