= Lajos Dorkota =

Hungarian politician

Member of the National Assembly
- In office 18 June 1998 – 30 June 2013

Personal details
- Born: 19 July 1958 (age 67) Sztálinváros, People's Republic of Hungary (today: Dunaújváros, Hungary)
- Party: Fidesz
- Spouse: Éva Ágnes Lévay
- Children: Dóra
- Profession: politician

Lajos Dorkota (born 19 July 1958) is a Hungarian politician, member of the National Assembly (MP) for Dunaújváros (Fejér County Constituency III) from 2010 to 2013. He also served as MP from Fejér County Regional List between 1998 and 2010.

He was a member of the Constitutional, Judicial and Standing Orders Committee from 14 May 2010 to 14 February 2011. He was Director of Government Office of Fejér County from 1 January 2011 to 30 June 2013.

Dorkota was appointed President of the Hungarian Energy and Public Utility Regulatory Authority (MEKH) on 1 July 2013, as a result he resigned from his parliamentary seat. Due to a change in the law no one was appointed to replace him as MP, explaining with the upcoming national election. Dorkota served as President of MEKH until 30 June 2020, when he was replaced by Péter János Horváth.

== Personal life ==
He is married. His wife is Éva Ágnes Lévay. They have a daughter, Dóra.
