= Magdolna Lakatos-Sira =

Hungarian politician

Member of the National Assembly
- In office 14 May 2010 – 5 May 2014

Personal details
- Born: 22 September 1964 (age 61) Fehérgyarmat, Hungary
- Party: Fidesz (since 2006); KDNP (since 2009)
- Children: 5
- Profession: politician

Magdolna Lakatos-Sira (née Sira; born 22 September 1964) is a Hungarian politician, member of the National Assembly (MP) from Fidesz Szabolcs-Szatmár-Bereg County Regional List between 2010 and 2014. She was a member of the Committee on Youth, Social, Family, and Housing Affairs and Committee on Health from 14 May 2010 to 5 May 2014.

She served as Mayor of Túristvándi between 1996 and 2014. She joined Fidesz in 2006. Later she joined Christian Democratic People's Party (KDNP) too in 2009. She was a member of the General Assembly of Szabolcs-Szatmár-Bereg County between 2006 and 2010. She has five children.

== Personal life ==
She is married and has five children.
