= Vilmos Patay =

Hungarian politician (born 1953)

Member of the National Assembly
- In office 14 May 2010 – 5 May 2014

Mayor of Dombóvár
- In office 11 October 2009 – 3 October 2010
- Preceded by: Loránd Szabó
- Succeeded by: Loránd Szabó

Personal details
- Born: 1953 (age 72–73)
- Party: Fidesz
- Profession: trader, politician

Vilmos Patay (born 1953) is a Hungarian agrarian trader and politician, member of the National Assembly (MP) for Dombóvár (Tolna County Constituency IV) between 2010 and 2014. He also served as mayor of Dombóvár between 2009 and 2010.

Patay was elected mayor during a by-election on 11 October 2009, after the previous mayor Loránd Szabó (MSZP) resigned from his position due corruption scandal. However Patay lost his office, when Szabó was re-elected mayor in the 2010 local elections. Patay was a member of the Parliamentary Committee on Agriculture from 14 May 2010 to 5 May 2014. He was appointed a member of the Committee on Employment and Labour on 11 February 2013.
