= Pál Kontur =

Hungarian car mechanic and politician

Member of the National Assembly
- In office 16 May 2006 – 5 May 2014

Personal details
- Born: 1949 (age 76–77) Budapest, Hungary
- Party: KDNP (since 1992); Fidesz (since 2003)
- Children: 3
- Profession: car mechanic, politician

Pál Kontur (born 1949) is a Hungarian car mechanic and politician, member of the National Assembly (MP) from Fidesz Komárom-Esztergom County Regional List from 2010 to 2014. He was also a Member of Parliament from the party's National List between 2006 and 2010. Kontur was a member of the Committee on Employment and Labour since 30 May 2006.

After passing the secondary school final examinations, he continued his studies at Bánki Donát Vocational School and graduated as a car mechanic. He served his apprenticeship in the Mátyásföld Truck Service and learned the profession from outstanding masters. He had working 25 years in Angyalföld at Number IV AFIT Car repair service and later at Spirál car repair service. He passed a master's examination as a car mechanic in 1980. He worked as a head of a team but because he was not member of the Hungarian Socialist Workers' Party (MSZMP), there were no more career opportunities for him.

He joined Christian Democratic People's Party (KDNP) in 1992. He has been a member of Fidesz since 2003 as well. From 2004 to 2005 he organised the worker and employee branch of Fidesz and became a national chairman of it upon the request of Viktor Orbán. He is still working as a car mechanic with piece rate.

== Personal life ==
He is married and has three children.
