= László Koszorús =

Hungarian economist and politician

Member of the National Assembly
- In office 16 May 2006 – 5 May 2014

Personal details
- Born: 28 August 1981 (age 44) Pécs, Hungary
- Party: Fidesz (since 1998)
- Profession: economist

László Koszorús (born 28 August 1981) is a Hungarian economist and politician, member of the National Assembly (MP) from Fidesz Baranya County Regional List between 2010 and 2014. He was also a Member of Parliament from the party's National List between 2006 and 2010.

He served as one of the four Senior Recorders in the inaugural session of the National Assembly (2006–2010) on 16 May 2006. He had been a member of the Economic and Information Technology Committee since 12 March 2007. He was appointed Vice Chairman of that Committee on 14 February 2011. He was appointed Deputy Secretary of State for Consumer Protection in July 2014.
