= Tibor Szólláth =

Hungarian engineer and politician (born 1969)

Member of the National Assembly
- In office 14 May 2010 – 5 May 2014

Personal details
- Born: 4 April 1969 (age 57) Hajdúnánás, Hungary
- Party: Fidesz
- Profession: engineer, politician

Tibor Zoltán Szólláth (born 4 April 1969) is a Hungarian engineer and politician, mayor of Hajdúnánás since 2010. He became a member of the National Assembly (MP) from the Nógrád County Regional List of the Fidesz in the 2010 parliamentary election.
