= Tamás Heintz =

Hungarian politician

Member of the National Assembly
- In office 16 May 2006 – 5 May 2014

Personal details
- Born: 6 February 1959 (age 67) Budapest, Hungary
- Children: 4
- Profession: physician, politician

Dr. Tamás Heintz (born February 6, 1959) is a Hungarian physician and politician, member of the National Assembly (MP) for Kaposvár (Somogy County Constituency I) between 2010 and 2014. He was also a Member of Parliament from the Fidesz Somogy County Regional List between 2006 and 2010.

He is supported by Fidesz but not member of the party itself. Heintz was a member of the Committee on Health since May 30, 2006. He functioned as deputy mayor of Kaposvár from 2005 to 2006.

Heintz became a consular secretary at the Hungarian embassy in Rome after the 2014 parliamentary election.

== Personal life ==
He is married and has four children.
