= István Pálffy =

Hungarian architect, journalist and politician (born 1959)

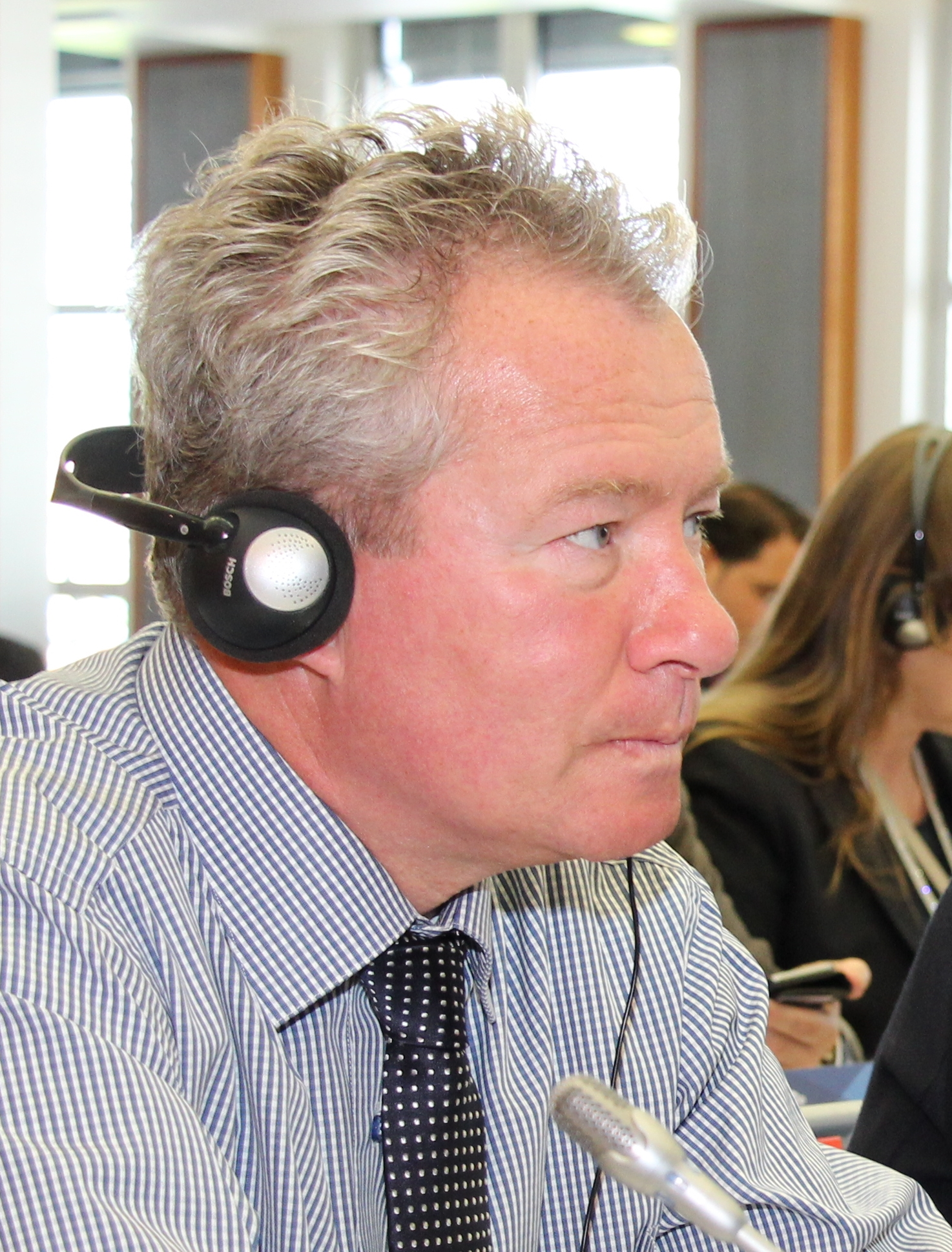
- Pálffy at EPP Political Assembly in June 2015

Member of the National Assembly
- In office 14 May 2010 – 5 May 2014

Personal details
- Born: November 21, 1959 (age 66) Debrecen, Hungary
- Party: KDNP
- Profession: Journalist; anchorman

István Pálffy (born November 21, 1959) is a Hungarian media personality, former news presenter, journalist and writer who also served as member of the National Assembly (MP) from Fidesz–KDNP Hajdú-Bihar County Regional List between 2010 and 2014.

== Biography ==
His father was the literary historian István Pálffy (1929–2001), a Hungarian lecturer in the University of London. He graduated as an architect from the Budapest University of Technology and Economics (BME) in 1986. He worked as an engineer for the State Construction Company of Hajdú-Bihar County from 1985 to 1988, then he was a staff member of Magyar Rádió between 1988 and 1997. He was an anchorman (A Hét, Magyarországról jövök) for Magyar Televízió for a short period of time, then served as a news presenter for TV2 from 1997 to 2002 (Tények and Jó estét Magyarország!). He returned to Magyar Televízió in 2002 where he became news presenter until 2008 and after that he became the editor—in—chief for M1's current affairs programme Panoráma. He left Magyar Televízió in 2009 as he started his political career.

Pálffy ran for a parliamentary seat in the 2010 national election, where he was elected from KDNP's Hajdú-Bihar County Regional List. He was elected Vice Chairman of the Committee on Culture and Press Freedom on 14 May 2010. He joined the Committee on Foreign Affairs in September 2013.

Besides his work, he vividly deals with cuisine and gastro-tourism, especially wines, many books written on these subjects by him.

== Controversy ==
On August 21, 2023 he returned to the tv screens as a host following a thirteen year hiatus. He was to host HírTv's brand new program titled Napi Aktuális, however, after hosting it just once, the channel fired him, after having made questionable statements about tolerating pedophilia.

== Works ==
- Pálffyction (monográfia, 2003)
- 222 szó az illemről (2003)
- 222 szó az utazásról (2004)
- Kicsik és nagyok illemkönyve (2004)
- Horvátország: Konyha-Kultúra-Kalauz (2005)
- Erdély: Konyha-Kultúra-Kalauz (2006)
- Csehország: Konyha-Kultúra-Kalauz (2007)
- Szlovákia: Konyha-Kultúra-Kalauz (2008)
- Mit érdemes megvenni? A 100 legjobb magyar bor 2008 (2008)
- Mit érdemes megvenni? A 100 legjobb magyar bor 2009 (2009)
- Egy kis hazai - Kaposvár és a régió (2009)
