= József Polics =

Hungarian engineer and politician (born 1955)

Mayor of Komló
- Incumbent
- Assumed office 3 October 2010
- Preceded by: Zoltán Páva

Member of the National Assembly
- In office 14 May 2010 – 5 May 2014

Personal details
- Born: 12 November 1955 (age 70) Pécs, Hungary
- Party: Fidesz
- Profession: civil engineer

József Polics (born November 12, 1955) is a Hungarian civil engineer and politician, member of the National Assembly (MP) for Komló (Baranya County Constituency IV) between 2010 and 2014. He was a member of the Committee on Employment and Labour during that time. He has been the mayor of Komló since October 2010.
