= Erika Szabó =

Hungarian jurist and politician

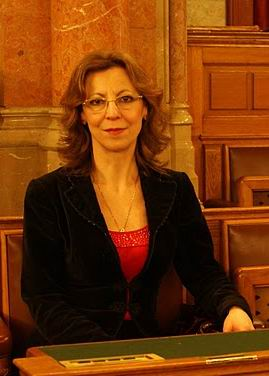

Member of the National Assembly
- In office 18 June 1998 – 5 May 2014
- In office 2 May 1990 – 27 June 1994

Personal details
- Born: 19 January 1959 (age 67) Szentes, Hungary
- Party: Fidesz (since 1996)
- Other political affiliations: SZDSZ (1989–1994)
- Children: 3
- Profession: jurist, politician

Dr. Erika Szabó (born 19 January 1959) is a Hungarian jurist and politician, who served as Secretary of State for Public Administration and Justice between 2 June 2010 and 5 June 2014. As candidate of Fidesz, she became a member of the National Assembly (MP) in the 1998 parliamentary election. She was also MP between 1990 and 1994, as member of the Alliance of Free Democrats (SZDSZ).
