= Éva Brájer =

Hungarian politician

Member of the National Assembly
- In office 14 May 2010 – 5 May 2014

Personal details
- Born: 1962 (age 63–64) Székesfehérvár, Hungary
- Party: Fidesz
- Profession: politician

Éva Brájer (born 1962) is a Hungarian politician, member of the National Assembly (MP) from Fejér County Regional List between 2010 and 2014. She was a member of the Committee on Education, Science and Research from 14 May 2010 to 5 May 2014.
