= Zsolt Németh (politician, 1984) =

Hungarian politician

Member of the National Assembly
- In office 14 May 2010 – 5 May 2014

Personal details
- Born: 14 December 1984 (age 41) Pécs, Hungary
- Party: Jobbik (since 2007)
- Profession: politician

Zsolt Németh (born 14 December 1984) is a Hungarian politician, member of the National Assembly (MP) from the Jobbik's Baranya County Regional List between 2010 and 2014.
