= Gergely Rubi =

Hungarian politician

Member of the National Assembly
- In office 14 May 2010 – 5 May 2014

Personal details
- Born: 17 July 1979 (age 46) Szikszó, Hungary
- Party: Jobbik (2007–c. 2018); MERT (2018–?)
- Profession: salesman, politician

Gergely Rubi (born 17 July 1979) is a Hungarian salesman and politician, who was the member of the National Assembly (MP) between 2010 and 2014, sitting as a politician of the far-right Jobbik.

== Biography ==
Gergely Rubi was born in Szikszó on 17 July 1979. He graduated from the Trade and Catering Vocational School, majoring in food and chemical goods trading, in 1997. He then worked in the media as a director and cameraman in various towns (Encs, Nyíregyháza, Hajdúhadház).

He joined Jobbik in 2007, founding and presiding its party branch in Hajdúhadház. He was elected vice-president of the party's Hajdú–Bihar County branch in the summer of 2009. He was elected Member of Parliament via the party's county regional list in the 2010 Hungarian parliamentary election. He was a member of the parliament's National Defense and Law Enforcement Committee from 2010 to 2014, and the National Security Committee for a brief time in October–December 2010.

Rubi lost his parliamentary mandate in the 2014 Hungarian parliamentary election. By early 2018, he left Jobbik and became a vocal opponent of Gábor Vona's moderation policy, the aim of which was the process of the party becoming from a far-right force to a centre-right people's party. In this capacity, Rubi was often interviewed by pro-government media (for instance, Echo TV) during the campaign ahead to the 2018 Hungarian parliamentary election. He interrupted a residents' forum held by Vona in February 2018, which many called a scene staged by the pro-government media. In November 2018, he announced he founded the Solutions, Balance, Order and Preparedness (MERT) party, which, however, never participated in an election.
