= István Bebes =

Hungarian politician

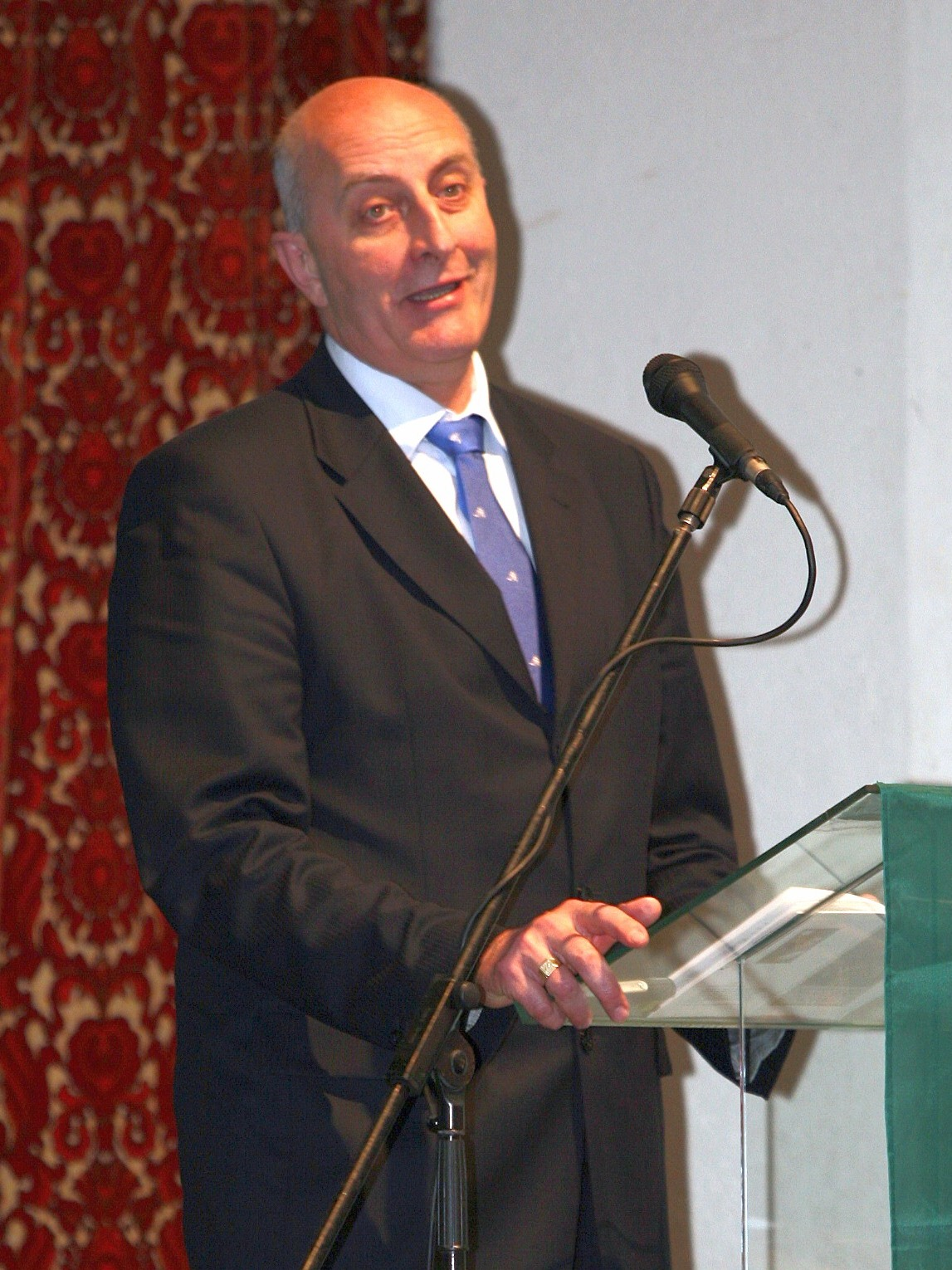
- Bebes István

Member of the National Assembly
- In office 18 June 1998 – 5 May 2014

Personal details
- Born: 24 March 1956 (age 70) Körmend, Hungary
- Party: Fidesz
- Spouse: Judit Bebesné Bazsó
- Children: Attila; Árpád; András; Adrienn; Anikó; Mátyás
- Profession: politician

István Géza Bebes (born 24 March 1956) is a Hungarian politician, member of the National Assembly (MP) from Vas County Regional List between 1998 and 2014. He is the Mayor of Körmend since 2002.

== Career ==
István Bebes joined Fidesz in 1990. He was elected as an individual candidate of Körmend in the 1990 local elections. He ran again in 1994, this time unsuccessfully. In 1998 he was again elected on the representative body of Körmend. He has been president of the Körmend party branch since 1995. He has been on the presidium of the party's Vas County Board since 1996 and in 1997 he was elected on the National Board of Fidesz. After the transformation into a people's party in 2003-2004, he was awarded the chairmanship of the Körmend constituency.

From the 1998 elections he secured a seat four times from the Vas County regional list of Fidesz He was elected mayor of Körmend four times in the local elections in 2002, 2006, 2010 and also in 2014.

Bebes served as a member of the Local Government and Urban Development Committee between 2006 and 2010. Since 14 May 2010 he has participated in the works of Committee on European Affairs.

=== Public life ===
He presided over BC MARC-Körmend Basketball Club from 1996 to 1999, and has been a member of the Technical Committee of the Hungarian Basketball Federation since 1997.

== Personal life ==
He is married. His wife is Judit Bebesné Bazsó. They have four sons (Attila, Árpád, András, Mátyás) and two daughters (Adrienn, Anikó).
