= Zoltán Nógrádi =

Hungarian politician

Member of the National Assembly
- In office 15 May 2002 – 5 May 2014

Personal details
- Born: 5 August 1969 (age 56) Szeged, Hungary
- Party: Fidesz (since 1997)
- Children: 2
- Profession: Politician

Zoltán Nógrádi (born August 5, 1969) is a Hungarian politician, member of the National Assembly (MP) for Szeged (Csongrád County Constituency II) from 2010 to 2014. He was also a Member of Parliament from Csongrád County Regional List between 2002 and 2006, and from the Fidesz National List from 2006 to 2010.

Nógrádi was elected mayor of Mórahalom on December 11, 1994. He joined Fidesz in 1997. He was a member of the Committee on European Affairs from 27 August 2004 to 5 May 2014.

== Personal life ==
He is married and has two sons.
