= Gabriella Bábi-Szottfried =

Hungarian politician

Member of the National Assembly
- In office 14 May 2010 – 5 May 2014

Personal details
- Born: 1966 (age 59–60) Vác, Hungary
- Party: Fidesz
- Children: 3
- Profession: politician

Gabriella Bábi-Szottfried (née Gabriella Szottfried; born 1966) is a Hungarian politician, member of the National Assembly (MP) for Vác (Pest County II) from 2010 to 2014. She was a member of the Committee on Youth, Social, Family, and Housing Affairs since 14 May 2010 and member of the Committee on Health Affairs since 14 February 2011. She was also mayor of Sződliget between 2006 and 2010.

== Personal life ==
Bábi-Szottfried has two daughters, Zsófia and Anna and a son, Levente.
