= Imre Vejkey =

Hungarian lawyer and politician

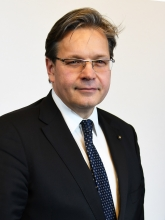

Member of the National Assembly
- Incumbent
- Assumed office 14 May 2010

Personal details
- Born: 15 January 1964 (age 62) Budapest, Hungary
- Party: KDNP (since 2003)
- Profession: jurist, politician

Dr. Imre Vejkey (born 15 January 1964) is a Hungarian lawyer and politician, member of the National Assembly (MP) from Fidesz–KDNP Tolna County Regional List then the alliance's national list since 2010. He served as one of the recorders of the parliament for a short time between 17 June and 19 September 2013.

Vejkey was a member of the Constitutional Preparatory Ad Hoc Committee from 2010 to 2011, Committee on Foreign Affairs from 2010 to 2014, Committee on European Affairs from 2010 to 2013, Committee on Constitutional Affairs, Justice and Home Affairs from 2013 to 2014. He is a member of the Legislative Committee since 2014. He served as Chairman of the Immunity Committee from 2014 to 2017. Following the death of György Rubovszky, he was appointed Chairman of the Committee on Legal Affairs in September 2017.
