= Szilvia Bertha =

Hungarian politician (born 1977)

Member of the National Assembly
- In office 14 May 2010 – 5 May 2014

Personal details
- Born: 4 July 1977 (age 48) Budapest, Hungary
- Party: Jobbik (2008–2014)
- Profession: businesswoman, politician

Szilvia Bertha (born 4 July 1977) is a Hungarian businesswoman and former politician, who was the member of the National Assembly (MP) between 2010 and 2014, sitting as a politician of the far-right Jobbik.

== Biography ==
She was born in Budapest on 4 July 1977. She graduated from the Faculty of Finance and Accounting of the Budapest College of Economics (BGF) in February 2001, specializing in entrepreneurship. She is owner and executive of the Roudes Soft Bt. software development family business.

Bertha joined Jobbik in 2008, founding and presiding its local branch in Isaszeg. She was party organizer in Pest County 4th constituency (Gödöllő) from 2008 to 2010. She was also a member of the party's economic cabinet. She was elected a Member of Parliament via the party's national list in the 2010 Hungarian parliamentary election. She worked in the parliament's Employment and Labor Committee from 2010 to 2014. She ran for an individual seat in Gödöllő (Pest County 6th constituency) in the 2014 Hungarian parliamentary election; she came to the third place and did not gain a parliamentary mandate.

Disagreeing with party leader Gábor Vona's moderation policy, she was alienated from the party's mainstream and left Jobbik in the summer of 2014 (however, this only became official in May 2016). ATV news channel reported in June 2015, that a new radical force has formed around Bertha, whose aspirations are supported by far-right politicians and members of the banned Magyar Gárda who were ousted from Jobbik. In May 2016, she announced that she will transform the currently operating organization Our Reason, Reasons Movement into a Christian-social party by the 2018 Hungarian parliamentary election. However, this effort remained unsuccessful. She endorsed ruling party Fidesz–KDNP during the 2022 Hungarian parliamentary election.
