= Sándor Lipők =

Hungarian politician

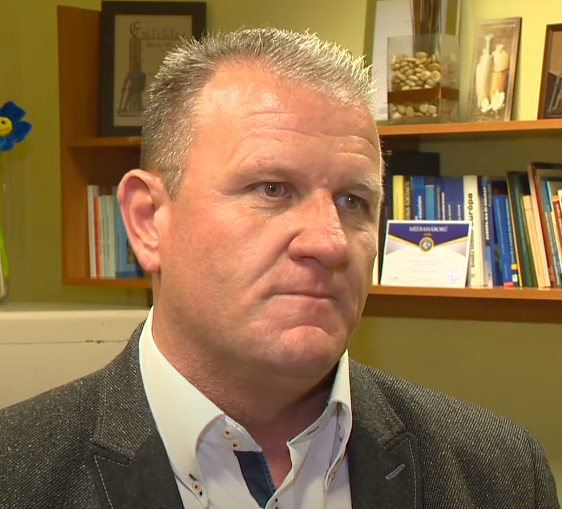

Member of the National Assembly
- In office 14 May 2010 – 5 May 2014

Personal details
- Born: 12 January 1969 (age 57) Kemecse, Hungary
- Party: Fidesz
- Children: 4
- Profession: politician

Sándor Zoltán Lipők (born January 12, 1969) is a Hungarian politician, member of the National Assembly (MP) for Baktalórántháza (Szabolcs-Szatmár-Bereg County Constituency V) between 2010 and 2014. He currently serves as Mayor of Kemecse since 2000. He was a member of the Committee on European Affairs from May 14, 2010 to May 5, 2014.

== Personal life ==
He is married and has four children.
