= Róbert Gajda =

Hungarian politician

Member of the National Assembly
- In office 14 May 2010 – 5 May 2014

Personal details
- Born: 1978 (age 47–48) Berettyóújfalu, Hungary
- Party: Fidesz (since 2001)
- Profession: politician

Róbert Gajda (born 1978) is a Hungarian politician, member of the National Assembly (MP) from Békés County Regional List between 2010 and 2014.

By profession, he is a teacher and ethnographer. He was a member of the presidency of the Fidelitas from 2004 to 2009, under the chairmanship of Péter Szijjártó. He was also a deputy mayor of Gyula and led the local branch of the Fidesz party.

He was a member of the Committee on Human Rights, Minority, Civic and Religious Affairs from May 14, 2010 to May 5, 2014 and Committee on Local Government and Regional Development from November 8, 2010 to May 5, 2014. He was appointed Director of the Békés County Government Office on July 1, 2014. He was dismissed from office by Prime Minister Viktor Orbán on 15 January 2017. In February 2017, he was entrusted with the implementation of the Transylvanian Economic Development Program and the supervision of the development of Hungarian enterprises operating in Transylvania.
