= Péter Mihalovics =

Hungarian politician

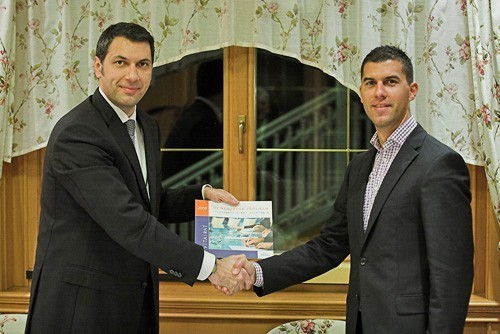
- Mihalovics (right) with János Lázár in 2010

Member of the National Assembly
- In office 14 May 2010 – 5 May 2014

Personal details
- Born: 8 August 1983 (age 42) Nyíregyháza, Hungary
- Party: Fidesz (since 2004)
- Profession: politician

Dr. Péter Mihalovics (born 8 August 1983) is a Hungarian politician, member of the National Assembly (MP) from Fidesz Veszprém County Regional List between 2010 and 2014. He was appointed ministerial commissioner for coordination of the programme ‘For the Future of the Next Generation’ within the Ministry of Administration and Justice on 1 October 2011.

He joined Fidelitas in 2002. He served as president of Veszprém branch until 2007. He was elected one of the national deputy-presidents of the organization in that year. Besides that he also became a member of the Fidesz in 2004. He worked as a representative in the General Assembly of Veszprém between 2006 and 2010.

He was elected MP in the 2010 parliamentary election. He was a member of the Committee on Foreign Affairs from 14 May 2010 to 5 May 2014.
