= Erzsébet Lanczendorfer =

Hungarian physician and politician (born 1942)

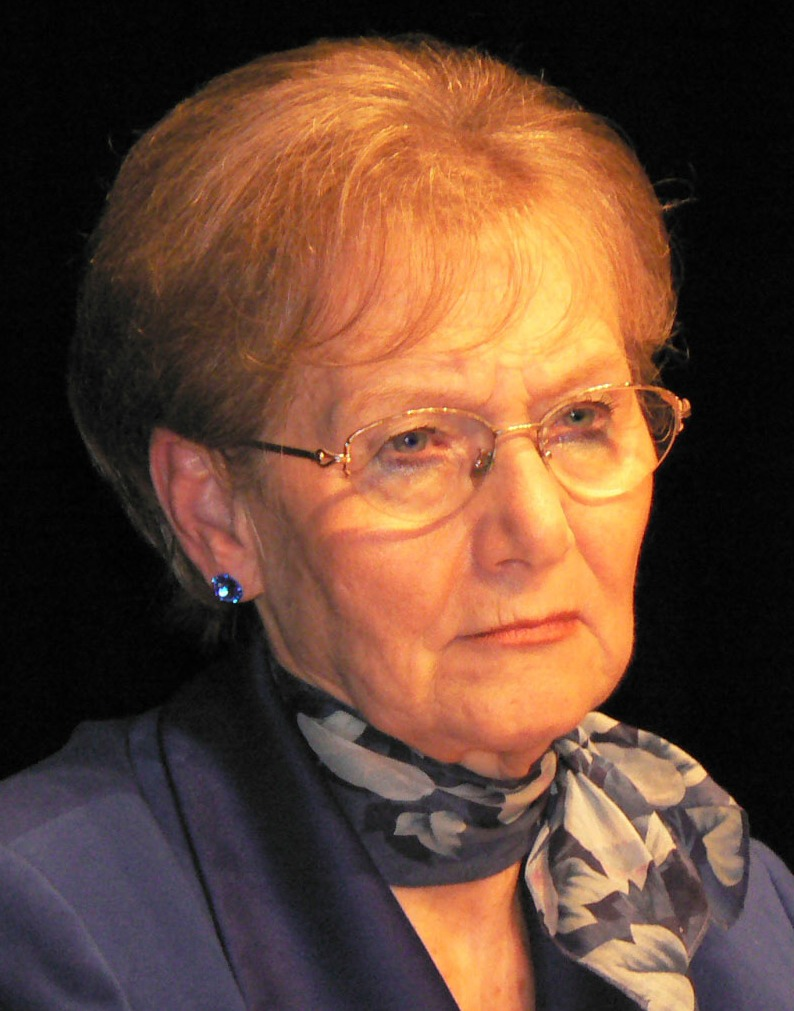

Member of the National Assembly
- In office 16 May 2006 – 5 May 2014

Personal details
- Born: 20 January 1942 (age 84) Románd, Hungary
- Party: KDNP (since 2007)
- Children: 3
- Profession: physician

Dr. Erzsébet Lanczendorfer (born 20 January 1942) is a Hungarian physician and politician, member of the National Assembly (MP) from Fidesz–KDNP Győr-Moson-Sopron County Regional List between 2006 and 2014.

== Biography ==
After finishing secondary studies in Pápa in 1960, she graduated as a physician from the Faculty of Medicine of the Budapest Medical University (today Semmelweis University) in 1966. She specialized in internal medicine in 1971. Following the university she worked for the Department of Medicine as an assistant physician, later as a deputy physician and between 1975 and 1988 she was a GP at the City Clinic No. 14. From 1988 to 1992 she served as head physician of group in the Clinic of Győr-Moson-Sopron County Council.

She was elected president of the Győr branch of the Christian Intellectuals' Alliance (KÉSZ). She had organized the KÉSZ round-table talks all over the country from 1997. She receives several prizes, including Győr City Jubilee Medal (1996), Silver Medal on the occasion of Hungary Culture Day (1998), Small Cross of the Order of Merit of the Republic of Hungary (1998).

In the 2006 parliamentary election she was elected MP from the right-wing alliance's Győr-Sopron County Regional List. She was appointed a member of the Committee on Youth, Social and Family Affairs on 30 May 2006. She joined the Christian Democratic People's Party (KDNP) in 2007.

== Personal life ==
She is divorced and has three children from her marriage.
