= Márta Talabér =

Hungarian politician (born 1972)

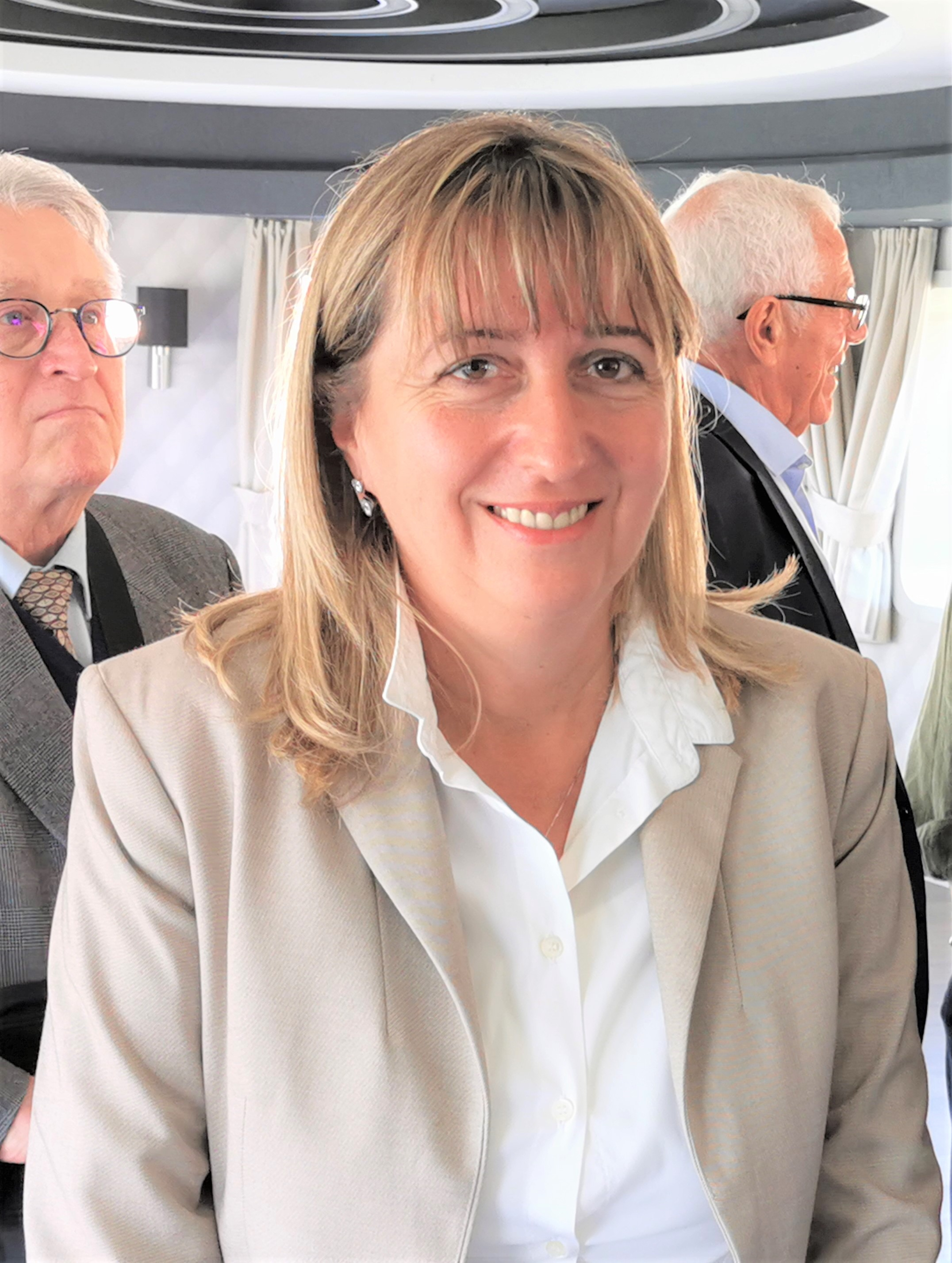
- Márta Talabér

Member of the National Assembly
- In office 14 May 2010 – 5 May 2014

Personal details
- Born: 27 January 1972 (age 54) Veszprém, Hungary
- Party: Fidesz (since 1990)
- Profession: teacher, politician

Márta Talabér (born January 27, 1972) is a Hungarian social pedagogue and politician, member of the National Assembly (MP) for Várpalota (Veszprém County Constituency V) from 2010 to 2014. She was elected mayor of Várpalota in the 2010 local elections.
