= József Dancsó =

Hungarian politician

Member of the National Assembly
- In office 18 June 1998 – 1 February 2014

Personal details
- Born: 17 November 1969 (age 56) Orosháza, Hungary
- Party: Fidesz (since 1994)
- Children: József; Dorottya
- Profession: politician

Dr. József Dancsó (born 17 November 1969) is a Hungarian politician, member of the National Assembly (MP) for Orosháza (Békés County Constituency VI) between 2010 and 2014. He also served as MP from Békés County Regional List between 1998 and 2010. He was a member of the Committee on Audit Office and Budget. He was elected Mayor of Orosháza in the 2010 local elections.

== Political career ==
He joined the Orosháza branch of Fidesz in the autumn of 1994, and was elected local president in the same year. He also held the position of deputy chairman of the Békés County Board of the party from 1996 to 1999. In the course of the development of the organisational structure of Fidesz-Hungarian Civic Alliance in 2003-2004 he was charged with heading the Orosháza constituency (Békés County VI).

In the municipal elections of 11 December 1994 he was elected member of the body of representatives. In the 1998 and the 2002 parliamentary elections he secured a seat from the party's Békés County Regional List. He was a member of Parliament's Audit Committee and of the committee nominating candidates for the position of vice president of the State Audit Office. He secured a mandate as incumbent representative in the Orosháza municipality in the 2002 local elections. He was active in the committee reviewing the consolidation of financial institutions which had received substantial Government support. He was a member of the body investigating the purchase and continued construction of the M5 motorway.

In the 2006 parliamentary elections he secured again a seat from the Békés county regional list. He was a member of the Committee on Budget, Finance and Audit Office. Four years later, he became Member of Parliament for Orosháza. He was appointed to a member of the Committee on Audit Office and Budget on 14 May 2010. Besides that he was the Chairman of the Subcommittee for the investigation of increase of public debt during the 2002–2010 (cabinets of the Hungarian Socialist Party) tenure.

Dancsó was appointed President of the Hungarian State Treasury, as a result he resigned from his parliamentary seat on 1 February 2014. His parliamentary seat remained vacant.

== Personal life ==
He is married and has two children, József and Dorottya.
