= Gyula Földesi =

Hungarian politician

Member of the National Assembly
- In office 2 May 2022 – 8 May 2026
- In office 14 May 2010 – 5 May 2014

Personal details
- Born: 27 August 1983 (age 42) Budapest, Hungary
- Party: Fidesz
- Profession: politician

Gyula Földesi (born 27 August 1983) is a Hungarian politician, member of the National Assembly (MP) for Pesterzsébet (Budapest Constituency XXIX) between 2010 and 2014. He was a member of the Committee on Consumer Protection from 14 May 2010 to 5 May 2014.

Földesi was a member of the General Assembly of Budapest between 2006 and 2010. Simultaneously, he was also a member of the district assembly of Pesterzsébet.

Földesi was elected one of the recorders of the National Assembly of Hungary on 14 May 2010. He returned to the Hungarian parliament after eight years, when he was elected MP via the Fidesz national list in the 2022 Hungarian parliamentary election. He became a member of the Legislative Committee. After the 2026 Hungarian parliamentary election, where Fidesz–KDNP suffered a heavy defeat and fell from power, Földesi did not take up his mandate.
