= Tamás Lukács =

Hungarian jurist and politician

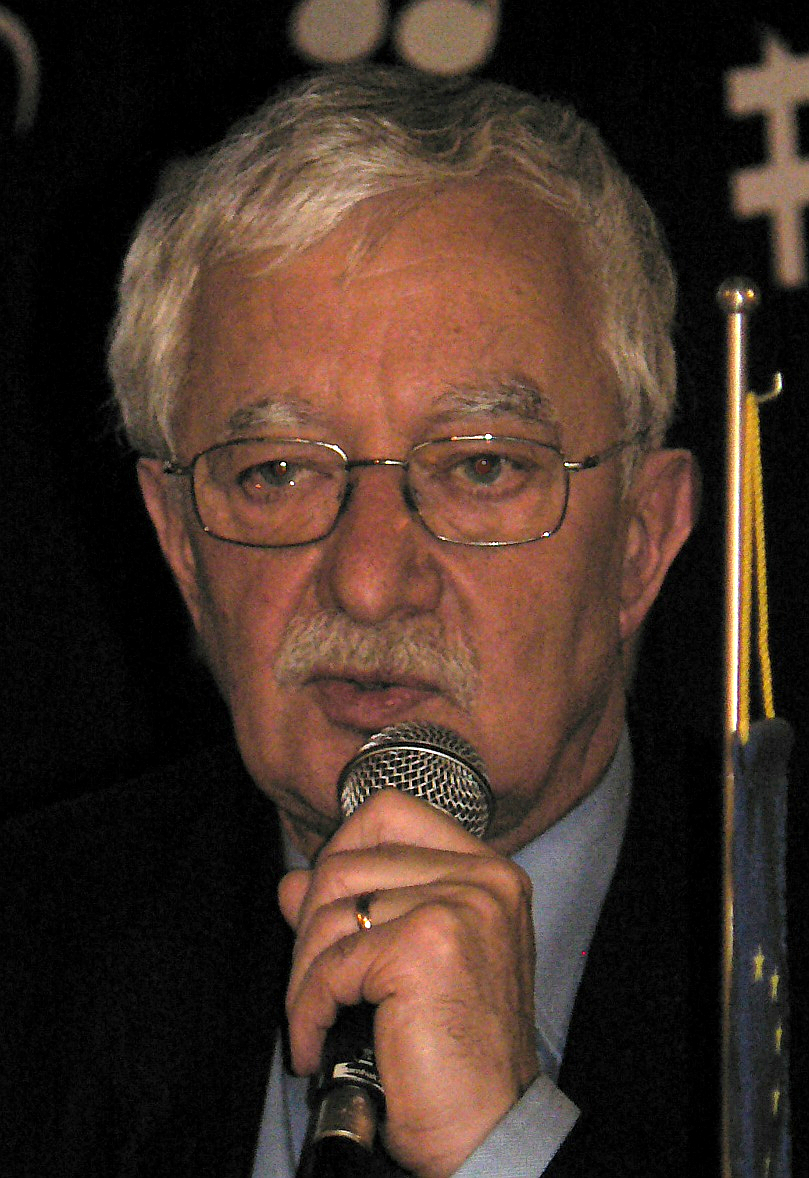
- Tamás Lukács in 2013

Member of the National Assembly
- In office 16 May 2006 – 5 May 2014
- In office 2 May 1990 – 27 June 1994

Personal details
- Born: 29 March 1950 (age 76) Eger, Hungary
- Party: KDNP (since 1989)
- Children: 5
- Profession: jurist, politician

Tamás Lukács (born 29 March 1950) is a Hungarian jurist and politician, former Member of Parliament from 1990 to 1994 and from 2006 to 2014.

Lukács graduated as a jurist from Eötvös Loránd University in 1976. He is a founding member of the Christian Democratic People's Party (KDNP). He was elected MP in the 1990 parliamentary election from his party's Heves County Regional List. Between 1990 and 1994, he served as Vice-Chairman of the Human Rights, Minorities and Religious Affairs Committee and a member of the Committee on Budget, Tax and Finance. From 1996 to 2000, he was a board member of the Magyar Rádió. When his party did not reach the 5% election threshold in the 1998 parliamentary election and collapsed due to internal conflicts, Lukács retired from the politics for a time and became a lecturer at the Pázmány Péter Catholic University from 1998 to 2006.

He was elected MP again in 2006 from the Fidesz–KDNP national list, and became a member of the Committee on Culture and Media. In 2010, he became MP from his party's Heves County Regional List. He functioned as Chairman of the Human Rights, Minority, Civil and Religious Affaires Committee from 2010 to 2014. Lukács was elected President of the Independent Police Complaints Board (FRP) by the National Assembly, taking the office on 26 February 2014.

== Personal life ==
He is married and has five children.
