= Lajos Kupcsok =

Hungarian politician

Member of the National Assembly
- In office 14 May 2010 – 5 May 2014

Personal details
- Born: 1961 (age 64–65) Ózd, Hungary
- Party: Entrepreneurs' Party (Fidesz-ally)
- Children: 2
- Profession: jurist

Dr. Lajos Kupcsok (born 1961) is a Hungarian jurist and politician, member of the National Assembly (MP) from Fidesz Pest County Regional List from 2010 to 2014. In 2014, he was appointed President of the Chamber of Commerce in Pest County.

Kupcsok was a member of the Economic and Information Technology Committee between May 14, 2010 and May 5, 2014.

== Personal life ==
He is married and has two children.
