= László Vincze (politician) =

Hungarian politician (1952–2026)

Member of the National Assembly
- In office 18 June 1998 – 5 May 2014

Personal details
- Born: 19 February 1952 Csongrád, Hungary
- Died: March 2026 (aged 74)
- Party: FKGP (1989–2001)
- Profession: Politician

László Mihály Vincze (19 February 1952 – March 2026) was a Hungarian educator and politician who was a member of the National Assembly (MP) for Csongrád (Csongrád County Constituency IV) from 1998 to 2014.

== Life and career ==
Vincze was born on 19 February 1952. He joined the Independent Smallholders, Agrarian Workers and Civic Party (FKGP) in 1989, where he served first as organizing secretary and later, from 1996, as president of the party's Csongrád branch. Based on the election coalition pact signed on 19 December 2001 between Fidesz and the Civic Association of Smallholders, he ran for the Csongrád Constituency again in the 2002 parliamentary election as candidate of Fidesz, and retained his mandate in the second round held on 21 April 2002. He was elected recorder of Parliament on 15 May 2002.

Vincze died in March 2026, at the age of 74.
