= József Michl =

Hungarian politician

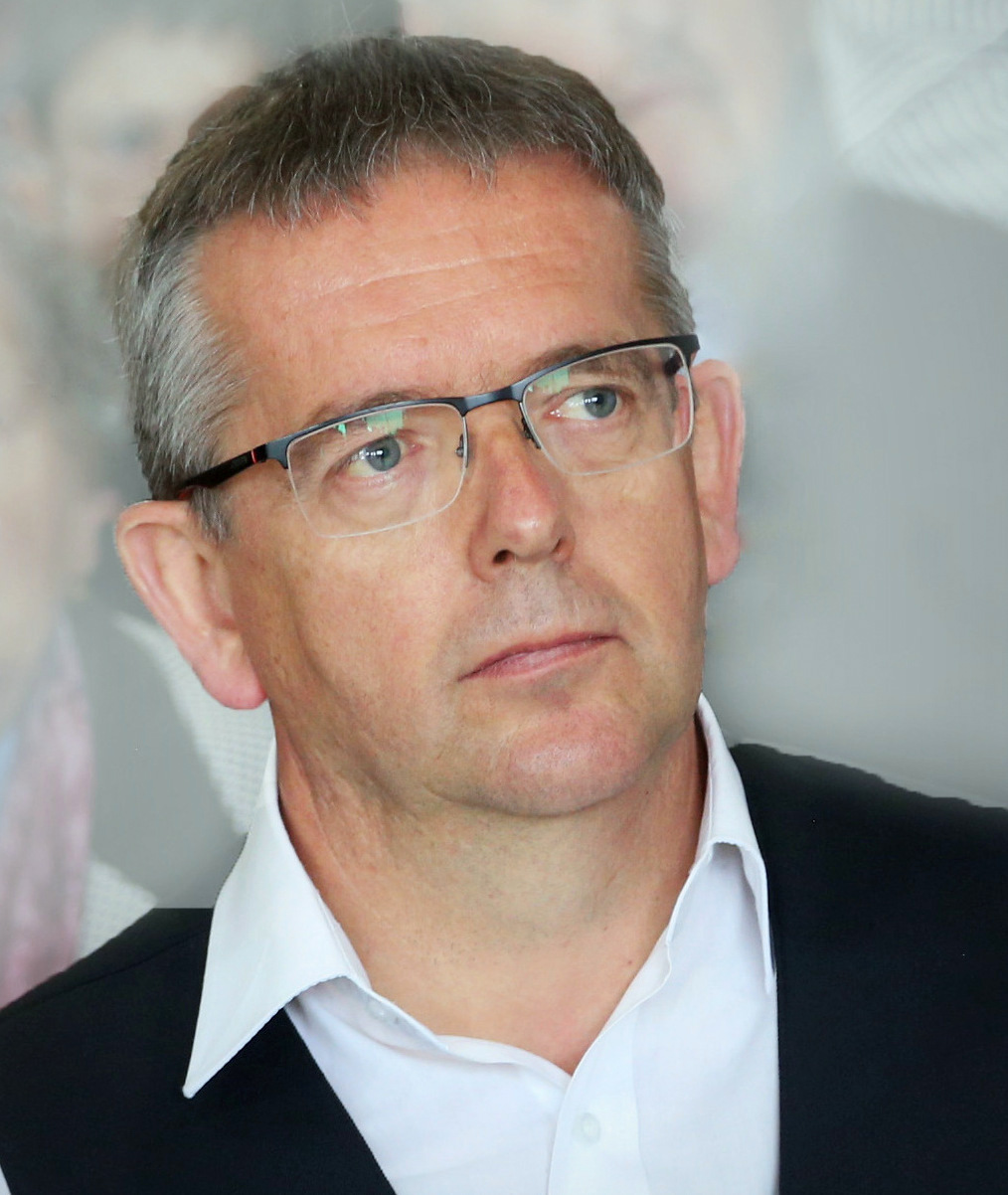

Member of the National Assembly
- In office 14 May 2010 – 5 May 2014

Personal details
- Born: 1960 (age 65–66) Budapest, Hungary
- Party: Fidesz, KDNP
- Spouse: Krisztina Michl-Palotai
- Children: Zsuzsanna; Domonkos; Júlia; Dorottya; Sebestyén
- Profession: politician

József Michl (born 1960) is a Hungarian politician, who was elected the mayor of Tata in 2006. He was a member of the National Assembly (MP) for Tata (Komárom-Esztergom County Constituency II) from 2010 to 2014.
