= Marcell Zsiga =

Hungarian jurist and politician (born 1979)

Member of the National Assembly
- In office 14 May 2010 – 5 May 2014

Personal details
- Born: 1979 (age 46–47) Miskolc, Hungary
- Party: Fidesz
- Profession: jurist, politician

Marcell Zsiga (born 1979) is a Hungarian jurist and politician, member of the National Assembly (MP) for Miskolc (Borsod-Abaúj-Zemplén County Constituency II) from 2010 to 2014.

He joined Fidelitas. He served in the Committee on Agriculture between 14 May 2010 and 27 February 2012. He was appointed a member of the Constitutional, Judicial and Standing Orders Committee on 9 May 2011 and of the Defence and Internal Security Committee on 4 November 2013. He was elected deputy mayor of Miskolc during the 2010 local elections.

== Controversies ==
In March 2011, Fidesz parliamentary group and the party's ethics committee concluded that Zsiga unlawfully consumed public funds jointly after his position of MP and representative in the Miskolc local government. Zsiga admitted the breaking of laws and forced to repay the money used illegally.

In February 2012, Zsiga made controversial comments about salaries of public works program. In response to a question, Zsiga said it is possible to live off 47,000 forints (c. € 162) per month. According to the opposition critics, the Orbán cabinet has reduced the salary from 60,200 forints before that.
