= Ferenc Ivanics =

Hungarian politician (born 1964)

Member of the National Assembly
- In office 18 June 1998 – 5 May 2014

Personal details
- Born: 1 August 1964 (age 62) Sopron, Hungary
- Party: Fidesz (since 1988)
- Spouse: Kriszta Ivanicsné Szekeres
- Children: Ferenc
- Profession: politician

Ferenc Ivanics (born 1 August 1964) is a Hungarian politician, member of the National Assembly (MP) for Kapuvár (Győr-Moson-Sopron County Constituency VI) from 2002 to 2014. Formerly he also served as Member of Parliament from Győr-Moson-Sopron County Regional List of Fidesz between 1998 and 2002.

He joined Fidesz in 1988. He is a member of the Parliamentary Committee on European Affairs since 1998. He served as President of the General Assembly of Győr-Moson-Sopron County from 1998 to 2002. He also functioned as President of the Western Transdanubian Development Council between 1999 and 2001. He was the co-Chairman of the National Alliance of County Governments between 1998 and 2002. He was the founder and first President of the Conciliation Board of Development Regions from 2001 to 2003. As of June 2015, he serves as Chairman of the Czech-Hungarian Section of the Interparliamentary Union.

== Personal life ==
He is married. His wife is Kriszta Ivanicsné Szekeres. They have a son, Ferenc.
