= László Lukács (politician, 1963) =

Hungarian politician

Member of the National Assembly
- In office 14 May 2010 – 5 May 2014

Personal details
- Born: 14 December 1963 (age 62) Kiskunhalas, Hungary
- Party: Fidesz (since 2006); KDNP (since 2006)
- Other political affiliations: MDF (1987–1991)
- Children: 1
- Profession: politician

For the Prime Minister of Hungary see László Lukács.

László Lukács (born December 14, 1963) is a Hungarian politician, member of the National Assembly (MP) for Kiskunhalas (Bács-Kiskun County Constituency VIII) from 2010 to 2014.

He was a member of the Hungarian Democratic Forum (MDF) between 1987 and 1991. He is a founding member of the Memorial Committee for the Hungarian Revolution of 1956. He joined Fidesz in May 2006 and Christian Democratic People's Party (KDNP) in June 2006. He served as deputy mayor of Kiskunhalas between 2006 and 2010. He was also a member of the General Assembly of Bács-Kiskun County from 2006 to 2010. Lukács was a member of the Parliamentary Committee on Cultural and Press Affairs between May 14, 2010, and May 5, 2014.
