= Tamás Sáringer-Kenyeres =

Hungarian politician (born 1961)

Member of the National Assembly
- In office 14 May 2010 – 5 May 2014

Personal details
- Born: 1961 (age 64–65) Keszthely, Hungary
- Party: Fidesz (since 2002); KDNP (since 2005)
- Profession: agronomist, politician

Tamás Sáringer-Kenyeres (born 1961) is a Hungarian agronomist and politician, member of the National Assembly (MP) from Fidesz–KDNP Zala County Regional List between 2010 and 2014.

== Work experience ==
He was born in Keszthely as the third child of Gyula Sáringer, professor of the Institute for Plant Protection and Department of Entomology in the Georgikon Faculty of the University of Pannonia, and Mária Kenyeres, plant protection product engineer. Sáringer-Kenyeres graduated as agronomist in 1986 and as agro-chemical engineer in 1990 from the University of Pannonia. He worked for the Hőgyész State Farm for six years since 1986 and Nagybajom Agricultural Co between 1988 and 1992. He was a regional representative of DuPont de Nemours Ltd. in Southern Transdanubia for eight years. He founded his own businesses in 1999.

== Political career ==
Sáringer-Kenyeres began his political career in 2002, when he became mayoral candidate of Fidesz in Keszthely during the 2002 local elections. He joined the party after the elections and became a member of the Cultural Board. He joined Keszthely branch of the Christian Democratic People's Party (KDNP) in 2005 and elected its chairman in 2006.

He was elected a member of the General Assembly of Zala County in the 2006 local elections.
