= László Zakó =

Hungarian politician (born 1959)

Member of the National Assembly
- In office 14 May 2010 – 5 May 2014
- In office 18 June 1998 – 14 May 2002

Personal details
- Born: 16 December 1959 (age 66) Zalaegerszeg, Hungary
- Party: FKGP (1998–2001); MIÉP (2001–2009); Jobbik (2009–2019)
- Profession: mining engineer, politician

László Zakó (born 16 December 1959) is a Hungarian mining engineer and former politician, who was a member of the National Assembly (MP) from 1998 to 2002, and from 2010 to 2014. He was a politician of the right-wing Independent Smallholders, Agrarian Workers and Civic Party (FKGP), then far-right Hungarian Justice and Life Party (MIÉP) and Jobbik.

== Professional career ==
Zakó was born in Zalaegerszeg in 1959, as the son of oil company director Vilmos Zakó and economist Mária Sáfrány. He finished his elementary studies at his birthplace and Szolnok. He graduated from the Varga Katalin Secondary School of Szolnok in 1978. He spent one year of military service in Marcali. He studied at the Technical University of Heavy Industry in Miskolc (present-day University of Miskolc), where he earned a degree of mining engineering in 1984.

He was employed as a drilling engineer at the Szeged Plant of the Petroleum Exploration Company, and then he became a drilling supervisor at the Szeged Mining Plant of MOL Rt. in 1989. In 1991, he graduated from the University of Miskolc with a degree in engineering and economics, and in 1996, he obtained a certificate in occupational safety engineering in Budapest. From 1994 to 2000, he was a senior technical associate at the MOL Rt. Resort and Hotel Business Unit (from 1998, MOL Hotels Rt.) in Nagykanizsa, and then became the managing director of TURUL 2000 Kft.

== Political career ==
As a candidate of FKGP, he was elected Member of Parliament for Nagykanizsa (Zala County Constituency II) in the second round of the 1998 Hungarian parliamentary election, with the support of Fidesz. He became a vice-chairman of the parliament's economic committee, and was also a member of the committee of youth and sports. As a representative of government minister József Torgyán, he was a member of the Zala County Regional Development Council, the Microcredit Committee of the Zala County Enterprise Development Foundation, and the West Transdanubian Regional Development Council from 1999 to 2001.

Zakó left the FKGP parliamentary group in June 2001. After a six-month period as an independent MP, he joined the Hungarian Justice and Life Party (MIÉP) parliamentary group in December 2001. He simultaneously joined the party itself too. He lost his mandate in the 2002 Hungarian parliamentary election, when MIÉP, whose national list included Zakó in 14th place, failed to reach the electoral threshold. Zakó functioned as a local government representative in Nagykanizsa from 2002 to 2006, where he was involved the economic and urban management committee. He served as national vice-president of MIÉP from 2003 to 2006. From 2004, he worked as the technical director and deputy general director of the Kehida Thermal Spa and Adventure Bath. He was a candidate of the electoral alliance MIÉP–Jobbik Third Way Alliance of Parties in the 2006 Hungarian parliamentary election. In 2008, he was again the national vice-president of the MIÉP for a short time.

Zakó joined the emerging Jobbik in 2009. He became the chairman of the party's Nagykanizsa branch and Zala County executive committee, and later its regional director. He secured a parliamentary mandate via the Jobbik's Zala County regional list in the 2010 Hungarian parliamentary election. He served as a member and vice-chairman of the committee of youth and sports. He lost his mandate during the 2014 Hungarian parliamentary election. Following the 2019 Hungarian local elections, he was appointed CEO of Nagykanizsa Asset Management and Service Company, serving in this capacity until his retirement in March 2025.
