= Richárd Tarnai =

Hungarian politician (born 1972)

Member of the National Assembly
- In office 14 May 2010 – 5 May 2014

Personal details
- Born: November 3, 1972 (age 53) Budapest, Hungary
- Party: KDNP
- Profession: jurist, politician

Dr. Richárd Tarnai (born 3 November 1972) is a Hungarian jurist and politician, member of the National Assembly (MP) for Kispest (Budapest Constituency XXVIII) between 2010 and 2014. He served as one of the recorders of the parliament from 14 May 2010 until 21 February 2011, when he was appointed Director of the Government Office of Pest County.
