= List of members of the National Assembly of Hungary (2014–2018) =

National Assembly of Hungary (2014–2018)

Type
- Type: unicameral
- Houses: National Assembly

History
- Founded: 6 May 2014
- Disbanded: 8 May 2018 (4 years, 2 days)
- Preceded by: Members 2010–2014
- Succeeded by: Members 2018–2022

Leadership
- Speaker: László Kövér, Fidesz

Structure
- Seats: 199
- Political groups: At opening: Government (133): Fidesz (117); KDNP (16); Opposition (65): MSZP (29); Jobbik (23); LMP (5); DK (4); Together (3); Dialogue (1); Ind. (1); Other (1): MNÖÖ (1)

Elections
- Last election: 6 April 2014
- Next election: 8 April 2018

Meeting place
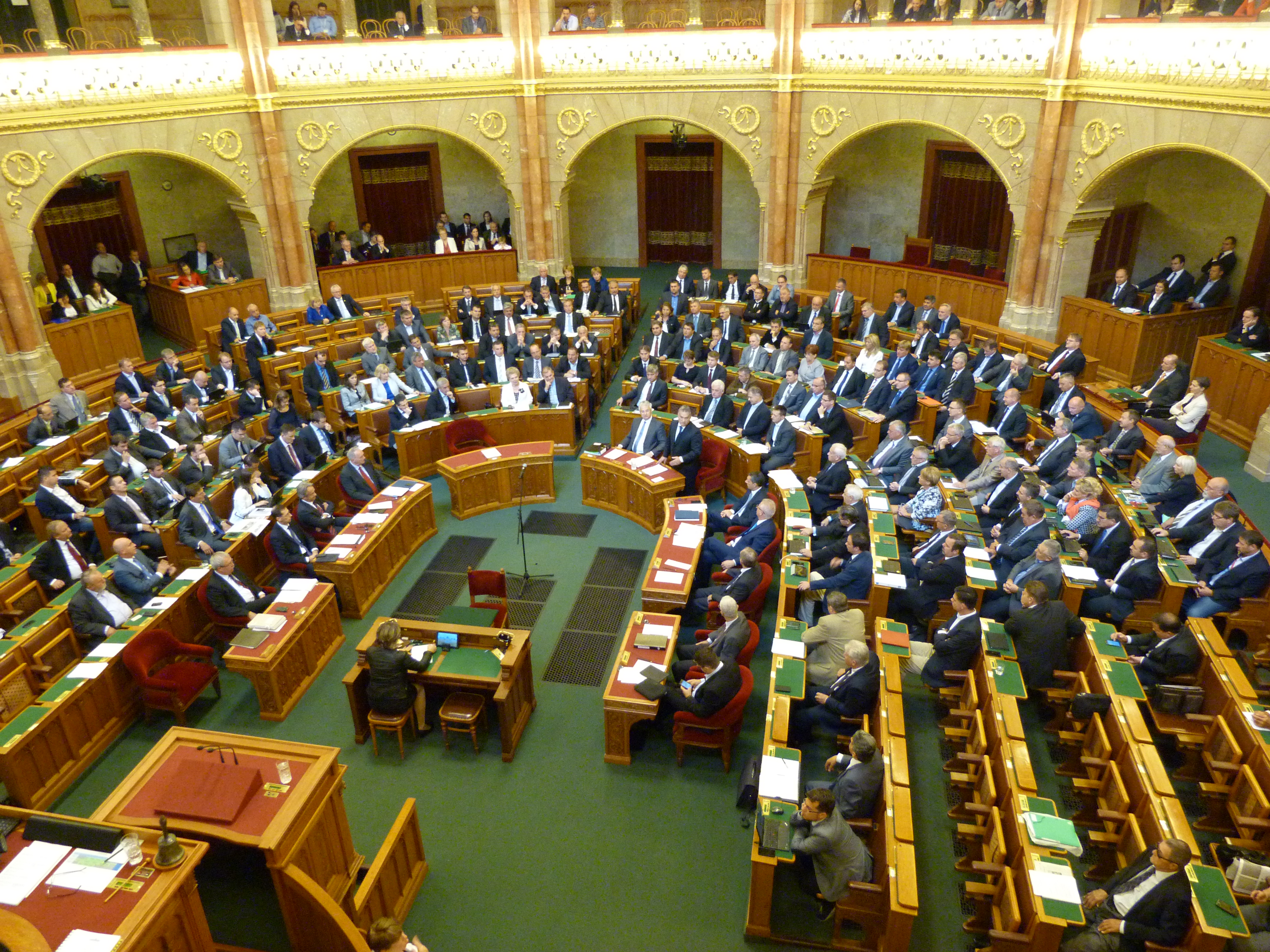
- Hungarian Parliament Building; Lajos Kossuth Square 1 Budapest, H-1055; Hungary

The list of members of the National Assembly of Hungary (2014–2018) is the list of members of the National Assembly – the unicameral legislative body of Hungary – according to the outcome of the Hungarian parliamentary election of 2014. The members of the new National Assembly were installed on May 6, 2014, and their mandates lasted until May 7, 2018. There has been a sizable number of mutations since due to the particular nature of the Hungary constitutional system. New members are supplied from their party lists so the resignation of individual members' seats does not change the balance of power in the National Assembly.

== Officials ==
=== Speaker ===
- László Kövér (Fidesz) (May 6, 2014 – May 7, 2018)

=== First Officer ===
- Márta Mátrai (Fidesz) (May 6, 2014 – May 7, 2018)

=== Deputy Speaker for Legislation ===
- Gergely Gulyás (Fidesz) (May 6, 2014 – October 1, 2017)
- Csaba Hende (Fidesz) (October 2, 2017 – May 7, 2018)

=== Deputy Speakers ===
- István Hiller (MSZP)
- István Jakab (Fidesz)
- János Latorcai (KDNP)
- Sándor Lezsák (Fidesz)
- Tamás Sneider (Jobbik)

=== Father of the House ===
- Béla Turi-Kovács (Fidesz) (age 78 in 2014)

=== Baby of the House ===
- Dóra Dúró (Jobbik) (age 27 in 2014)

==== Senior Recorders ====
- Tibor Bana (Jobbik) (age 28 in 2014)
- Gergely Farkas (Jobbik) (age 28 in 2014)
- Anita Heringes (MSZP) (age 29 in 2014)

== Parliamentary groups ==
↓
133	38	23	5
Fidesz–KDNP	Unity	Jobbik	LMP

Groups		Members		Chairperson(s)		Status
Groups		At foundation 6 May 2014	At dissolvation 4 May 2018	Chairperson(s)		Status
Fidesz–KDNP Coalition	Fidesz	117 / 199	114 / 199	Antal Rogán	6 May 2014 – 30 September 2015	Government
Fidesz–KDNP Coalition	Fidesz	117 / 199	114 / 199	Lajos Kósa	1 October 2015 – 1 October 2017	Government
Fidesz–KDNP Coalition	Fidesz	117 / 199	114 / 199	Gergely Gulyás	2 October 2017 – 4 May 2018	Government
Fidesz–KDNP Coalition	Christian Democratic People's Party (KDNP)	16 / 199	17 / 199	Péter Harrach	6 May 2014 – 4 May 2018	Government
Unity	Hungarian Socialist Party (MSZP)	29 / 199	28 / 199	Attila Mesterházy	6 May 2014 – 2 June 2014	Opposition
Unity	Hungarian Socialist Party (MSZP)	29 / 199	28 / 199	József Tóbiás	3 June 2014 – 7 July 2016	Opposition
Unity	Hungarian Socialist Party (MSZP)	29 / 199	28 / 199	Bertalan Tóth	8 July 2016 – 4 May 2018	Opposition
Unity	Democratic Coalition (DK)	4 / 199	4 / 199	–	–	Opposition
Unity	Together	3 / 199	1 / 199	–	–	Opposition
Unity	Dialogue for Hungary (PM)	1 / 199	1 / 199	–	–	Opposition
Unity	Hungarian Liberal Party (MLP)	1 / 199	1 / 199	–	–	Opposition
Jobbik		23 / 199	24 / 199	Gábor Vona	6 May 2014 – 29 May 2016	Opposition
Jobbik		23 / 199	24 / 199	János Volner	30 May 2016 – 4 May 2018	Opposition
Politics Can Be Different (LMP)		5 / 199	6 / 199	András Schiffer	6 May 2014 – 5 September 2016	Opposition
Politics Can Be Different (LMP)		5 / 199	6 / 199	Erzsébet Schmuck	6 September 2016 – 15 February 2017	Opposition
Politics Can Be Different (LMP)		5 / 199	6 / 199	Bernadett Szél	16 February 2017 – 4 May 2018	Opposition
Independent		0 / 199	3 / 199	–	–	Opposition
Source: Országgyűlés

Note: DK, Együtt, PM and Liberals politicians are also technically independent MPs

== Members of the National Assembly ==
=== By name ===
No.	Name	Party	Born	district	list
1	Péter Ágh	Fidesz	30 January 1982	Vas County 2.vk.	–
2	Balázs Ander	Jobbik	11 December 1976	–	Jobbik National List, no. 20
3	dr. István Apáti	Jobbik	23 March 1978	–	Jobbik National List, no. 14
4	dr. András Aradszki	KDNP	22 May 1956	Pest County 1.vk.	–
5	László B. Nagy	Fidesz	9 February 1958	Csongrád County 2.vk.	–
6	György Balla	Fidesz	11 August 1962	–	Fidesz-KDNP National List, no. 48
7	Mihály Balla	Fidesz	21 May 1965	Nógrád County 2.vk.	–
8	Zoltán Balogh	Fidesz	7 January 1958	–	Fidesz-KDNP National List, no. 19
9	Tibor Bana	Jobbik	1 December 1985	–	Jobbik National List, no. 18
10	Ildikó Bangó-Borbély	MSZP	29 March 1972	–	Unity National List, no. 20
11	Erik Bánki	Fidesz	26 May 1970	–	Fidesz-KDNP National List, no. 50
12	Gábor Bányai	Fidesz	27 August 1969	Bács-Kiskun County 5.vk.	–
13	dr. Gergely Bárándy	MSZP	28 November 1976	–	Unity National List, no. 29
14	Mónika Bartos	Fidesz	24 December 1975	–	Fidesz-KDNP National List, no. 61
15	Zsolt Becsó	Fidesz	14 June 1967	Nógrád County 1.vk.	–
16	János Bencsik	Fidesz	31 July 1965	Komárom-Esztergom County 1.vk.	–
17	dr. Ildikó Bene	Fidesz	21 August 1962	Jász-Nagykun-Szolnok County 1.vk.	–
18	Márk Bíró	Fidesz	1974	–	Fidesz-KDNP National List, no. 54
19	Sándor Bodó	Fidesz	25 November 1963	Hajdú-Bihar County 5.vk.	–
20	István Boldog	Fidesz	10 November 1966	Jász-Nagykun-Szolnok County 4.vk.	–
21	Zoltán Bóna	Fidesz	9 May 1981	Pest County 8.vk.	–
22	dr. Gyula Budai	Fidesz	2 April 1963	–	Fidesz-KDNP National List, no. 39
23	Sándor Burány	MSZP	19 August 1956	Budapest 9.vk.	–
24	Zsolt Csenger-Zalán	Fidesz	22 August 1957	Pest County 2.vk.	–
25	Péter Cseresnyés	Fidesz	9 January 1960	Zala County 3.vk.	–
26	Péter Csizi	Fidesz	24 August 1982	Baranya County 1.vk.	–
27	Katalin Csöbör	Fidesz	20 January 1965	Borsod-Abaúj-Zemplén County 1.vk.	–
28	György Czerván	Fidesz	12 July 1959	Pest County 9.vk.	–
29	dr. Sándor Czomba	Fidesz	14 August 1963	–	Fidesz-KDNP National List, no. 36
30	dr. Judit Czunyiné Bertalan	Fidesz	6 August 1974	Komárom-Esztergom County 3.vk.	–
31	Béla Dankó	Fidesz	13 May 1969	Békés County 2.vk.	–
32	Márta Demeter MSZP member until 2017 January	LMP	6 March 1983	–	Unity National List, no. 23
33	Zoltán Demeter	Fidesz	1 December 1963	Borsod-Abaúj-Zemplén County 4.vk.	–
34	Mónika Dunai	Fidesz	21 September 1966	Budapest 14.vk.	–
35	Dóra Dúró	Jobbik	5 March 1987	–	Jobbik National List, no. 4
36	Zsolt Egyed	Jobbik	27 April 1974	–	Jobbik National List, no. 19
37	Flórián Farkas	Fidesz	4 September 1957	–	Fidesz-KDNP National List, no. 17
38	Gergely Farkas	Jobbik	3 November 1986	–	Jobbik National List, no. 9
39	Sándor Farkas	Fidesz	18 September 1953	Csongrád County 3.vk.	–
40	dr. Sándor Fazekas	Fidesz	3 May 1963	Jász-Nagykun-Szolnok County 3.vk.	–
41	Mátyás Firtl	KDNP	30 October 1949	Győr-Moson-Sopron County 4.vk.	–
42	Gábor Fodor	Independent	27 September 1962	–	Unity National List, no. 4
43	dr. János Fónagy	Fidesz	11 July 1942	Budapest 3.vk.	–
44	Sándor Font	Fidesz	23 November 1960	Bács-Kiskun County 3.vk.	–
45	László Földi	KDNP	7 September 1952	Pest County 12.vk.	–
46	Gergely Gaal from 18 September 2017	KDNP	3 June 1977	Mandate of György Rubovszky	
47	dr. Dénes Galambos	Fidesz	10 April 1957	Fejér County 4.vk.	–
48	Attila Gelencsér	Fidesz	14 January 1968	Somogy County 1.vk.	–
49	Zoltán Gőgös from 27 October 2014	MSZP	9 May 1960	Mandate of László Botka	
50	dr. Gergely Gulyás	Fidesz	21 September 1981	–	Fidesz-KDNP National List, no. 55
51	Nándor Gúr	MSZP	25 December 1957	–	Unity National List, no. 8
52	Alpár Gyopáros	Fidesz	15 May 1978	Győr-Moson-Sopron County 3.vk.	–
53	Márton Gyöngyösi	Jobbik	8 July 1977	–	Jobbik National List, no. 7
54	Balázs Győrffy	Fidesz	21 April 1979	–	Fidesz-KDNP National List, no. 13
55	Ferenc Gyurcsány	Independent	4 June 1961	–	Unity National List, no. 3
56	dr. Csaba Gyüre	Jobbik	19 May 1965	–	Jobbik National List, no. 8
57	dr. Ákos Hadházy from 12 September 2016	LMP	4 March 1974	Mandate of András Schiffer	
58	Sándor Hadházy	Fidesz	10 August 1956	Pest County 3.vk.	–
59	János Halász	Fidesz	11 May 1963	–	Fidesz-KDNP National List, no. 35
60	Gábor István Harangozó	MSZP	27 September 1975	–	Unity National List, no. 24
61	dr. Tamás Harangozó	MSZP	27 June 1979	–	Unity National List, no. 9
62	dr. János Hargitai	KDNP	24 April 1958	Baranya County 3.vk.	–
63	Péter Harrach	KDNP	2 November 1947	Pest County 4.vk.	–
64	Lórántné Hegedűs	Jobbik	1970	–	Jobbik National List, no. 10
65	Csaba Hende	Fidesz	5 February 1960	Vas County 1.vk.	–
66	Anita Heringes	MSZP	22 August 1984	–	Unity National List, no. 25
67	dr. István Hiller	MSZP	7 May 1974	Budapest 16.vk.	–
68	Ferenc Hirt	Fidesz	1967	Tolna County 3.vk.	–
69	Dezső Hiszékeny	MSZP	22 February 1956	Budapest 7.vk.	–
70	dr. Rózsa Hoffmann	KDNP	22 January 1948	–	Fidesz-KDNP National List, no. 33
71	István Hollik from 21 September 2015	KDNP	23 January 1982	Mandate of Ferenc Papcsák	
72	dr. Péter Hoppál	Fidesz	15 November 1972	Baranya County 2.vk.	–
73	Imre Horváth from 8 December 2014	MSZP	28 June 1944	Budapest 11.vk.	–
74	István Horváth	Fidesz	28 February 1970	Tolna County 1.vk.	–
75	László Horváth	Fidesz	24 April 1962	Heves County 2.vk.	–
76	dr. Richárd Hörcsik	Fidesz	23 December 1955	Borsod-Abaúj-Zemplén County 5.vk.	–
77	István Ikotity	LMP	27 June 1977	–	LMP National List, no. 3
78	István Jakab	Fidesz	17 September 1947	–	Fidesz-KDNP National List, no. 12
79	dr. István Józsa	MSZP	7 September 1953	–	Unity National List, no. 27
80	Ákos Kara	Fidesz	21 May 1975	Győr-Moson-Sopron County 2.vk.	–
81	Lajos Kepli	Jobbik	11 October 1978	–	Jobbik National List, no. 22
82	dr. János Kerényi	Fidesz	9 December 1945	–	Fidesz-KDNP National List, no. 51
83	Zoltán Kész from 16 March 2015	Independent	22 January 1974	Veszprém County 1.vk.	–
84	László Kiss	MSZP	2 July 1979	Budapest 10.vk.	–
85	Károly Kontrát	Fidesz	12 April 1956	Veszprém County 2.vk.	–
86	Péter Kónya	Independent	19 February 1969	–	Unity National List, no. 16
87	Lajos Korózs	MSZP	7 September 1958	–	Unity National List, no. 17
88	Lajos Kósa	Fidesz	14 March 1964	Hajdú-Bihar County 1.vk.	–
89	dr. József Kovács	Fidesz	5 July 1951	Békés County 3.vk.	–
90	Sándor Kovács	Fidesz	15 July 1966	Szabolcs-Szatmár-Bereg County 5.vk.	–
91	dr. Zoltán Kovács	Fidesz	1 December 1957	Veszprém County 4.vk.	–
92	László Kövér	Fidesz	29 December 1959	–	Fidesz-KDNP National List, no. 3
93	Gábor Kubatov	Fidesz	17 February 1966	–	Fidesz-KDNP National List, no. 22
94	László Kucsák	Fidesz	7 January 1964	Budapest 15.vk.	–
95	Gergely Kulcsár	Jobbik	12 August 1979	–	Jobbik National List, no. 23
96	Ágnes Kunhalmi	MSZP	31 October 1982	–	Unity National List, no. 13
97	László L. Simon	Fidesz	28 March 1972	–	Fidesz-KDNP National List, no. 63
98	Tamás László	Fidesz	29 October 1950	Budapest 12.vk.	–
99	dr. János Latorcai	KDNP	9 May 1944	–	Fidesz-KDNP National List, no. 21
100	János Lázár	Fidesz	19 February 1975	Csongrád County 4.vk.	–
101	dr. Zsolt Legény	MSZP	6 December 1978	–	Unity National List, no. 18
102	Sándor Lezsák	Fidesz	30 October 1949	Bács-Kiskun County 4.vk.	–
103	dr. László György Lukács from 30 June 2014	Jobbik	7 March 1983	Mandate of Zoltán Balczó	
104	Zoltán Lukács	MSZP	24 April 1969	–	Unity National List, no. 11
105	Zoltán Magyar	Jobbik	28 February 1982	–	Jobbik National List, no. 17
106	Jenő Manninger	Fidesz	1955	Zala County 2.vk.	–
107	dr. Márta Mátrai	Fidesz	22 February 1948	–	Fidesz-KDNP National List, no. 4
108	dr. Roland Mengyi	Fidesz	1 March 1975	Borsod-Abaúj-Zemplén County 6.vk.	–
109	Attila Mesterházy	MSZP	30 January 1974	–	Unity National List, no. 1
110	Ádám Mirkóczki	Jobbik	23 June 1978	–	Jobbik National List, no. 12
111	dr. Ágnes Molnár	Fidesz	12 May 1956	–	Fidesz-KDNP National List, no. 49
112	dr. Zsolt Molnár	MSZP	4 October 1974	–	Unity National List, no. 10
113	József Attila Móring	KDNP	8 October 1968	Somogy County 3.vk.	–
114	dr. István Nagy	Fidesz	6 October 1967	Győr-Moson-Sopron County 5.vk.	–
115	Szilárd István Németh	Fidesz	24 April 1964	–	Fidesz-KDNP National List, no. 59
116	Zsolt Németh	Fidesz	14 October 1963	–	Fidesz-KDNP National List, no. 23
117	Zsolt Nyitrai	Fidesz	12 April 1977	Heves County 1.vk.	–
118	dr. Lajos Oláh	Independent	17 June 1969	Budapest 5.vk.	–
119	Viktor Orbán	Fidesz	31 May 1963	–	Fidesz-KDNP National List, no. 1
120	Károly Pánczél	Fidesz	3 April 1961	Pest County 11.vk.	–
121	dr. Imre Pesti	Fidesz	16 September 1952	–	Fidesz-KDNP National List, no. 53
122	Attila Petneházy	Fidesz	14 June 1966	Szabolcs-Szatmár-Bereg County 1.vk.	–
123	Tamás Pintér from 12 September 2016	Jobbik	22 May 1981	Mandate of Előd Novák	
124	János Pócs	Fidesz	17 November 1963	Jász-Nagykun-Szolnok County 2.vk.	–
125	Tibor Pogácsás	Fidesz	4 April 1964	Pest County 10.vk.	–
126	dr. László Pósán	Fidesz	20 September 1965	Hajdú-Bihar County 2.vk.	–
127	Árpád János Potápi	Fidesz	28 March 1967	Tolna County 2.vk.	–
128	dr. Róbert Répássy	Fidesz	18 May 1968	–	Fidesz-KDNP National List, no. 34
129	dr. Bence Rétvári	KDNP	10 December 1979	–	Fidesz-KDNP National List, no. 38
130	Máriusz Révész from 15 September 2014	Fidesz	31 May 1967	Mandate of Róbert Rácz	
131	Lajos Rig from 11 May 2015	Jobbik	13 November 1974	Veszprém County 3.vk.	–
132	Gábor Riz	Fidesz	5 March 1956	Borsod-Abaúj-Zemplén County 3.vk.	–
133	Antal Rogán	Fidesz	29 January 1972	Budapest 1.vk.	–
134	dr. László Salacz	Fidesz	21 May 1971	Bács-Kiskun County 1.vk.	–
135	Benedek Sallai R.	LMP	13 August 1974	–	LMP National List, no. 4
136	Erzsébet Schmuck	LMP	19 February 1954	–	LMP National List, no. 5
137	dr. Gabriella Selmeczi	Fidesz	21 June 1965	–	Fidesz-KDNP National List, no. 56
138	dr. Zsolt Semjén	KDNP	8 August 1962	–	Fidesz-KDNP National List, no. 2
139	dr. Miklós Seszták	KDNP	31 October 1968	Szabolcs-Szatmár-Bereg County 3.vk.	–
140	dr. István Simicskó	KDNP	29 November 1961	Budapest 2.vk.	–
141	dr. Miklós Simon	Fidesz	20 January 1962	Szabolcs-Szatmár-Bereg County 6.vk.	–
142	Róbert Balázs Simon	Fidesz	1970	Győr-Moson-Sopron County 1.vk.	–
143	György Simonka	Fidesz	14 March 1974	Békés County 4.vk.	–
144	Tamás Sneider	Jobbik	11 June 1972	–	Jobbik National List, no. 5
145	Miklós Soltész	KDNP	23 July 1963	–	Fidesz-KDNP National List, no. 37
146	dr. Gábor Staudt	Jobbik	10 May 1983	–	Jobbik National List, no. 16
147	Sándor Szabó	MSZP	29 October 1975	Csongrád County 1.vk.	–
148	Szabolcs Szabó	Independent	11 February 1979	Budapest 17.vk.	–
149	Tímea Szabó	Independent	18 January 1976	–	Unity National List, no. 5
150	Zsolt Szabó	Fidesz	20 October 1963	Heves County 3.vk.	–
151	Attila Szabolcs	Fidesz	28 July 1945	Budapest 18.vk.	–
152	dr. László Szakács	MSZP	7 December 1975	–	Unity National List, no. 15
153	László Szászfalvi	KDNP	11 January 1961	Somogy County 2.vk.	–
154	Kristóf Szatmáry	Fidesz	10 June 1975	Budapest 13.vk.	–
155	István Szávay	Jobbik	8 March 1981	–	Jobbik National List, no. 15
156	dr. Bernadett Szél	LMP	9 March 1977	–	LMP National List, no. 2
157	Zsuzsanna Szelényi from 10 June 2014	Independent	6 October 1966	Mandate of Gordon Bajnai	
158	Péter Szijjártó	Fidesz	30 October 1978	–	Fidesz-KDNP National List, no. 25
159	György Szilágyi	Jobbik	11 November 1966	–	Jobbik National List, no. 13
160	dr. Lajos Szűcs	Fidesz	15 September 1964	Pest County 7.vk.	–
161	András Tállai	Fidesz	5 February 1959	Borsod-Abaúj-Zemplén County 7.vk.	–
162	dr. Gergely Tapolczai	Fidesz	21 December 1975	–	Fidesz-KDNP National List, no. 62
163	László Tasó	Fidesz	14 January 1963	Hajdú-Bihar County 3.vk.	–
164	László Teleki	MSZP	1 August 1959	–	Unity National List, no. 30
165	Zoltán Tessely	Fidesz	1967	Fejér County 3.vk.	–
166	dr. István Tiba	Fidesz	6 May 1966	Hajdú-Bihar County 6.vk.	–
167	Zsolt Tiffán	Fidesz	1965	Baranya County 4.vk.	–
168	dr. Attila Tilki	Fidesz	9 May 1967	Szabolcs-Szatmár-Bereg County 4.vk.	–
169	József Tóbiás	MSZP	15 July 1970	–	Unity National List, no. 7
170	dr. Bertalan Tóth	MSZP	10 November 1975	–	Unity National List, no. 22
171	Csaba Tóth	MSZP	1960	Budapest 8.vk.	–
172	Gábor Törő	Fidesz	7 March 1962	Fejér County 2.vk.	–
173	István Tukacs	MSZP	10 July 1958	–	Unity National List, no. 28
174	dr. Béla Turi-Kovács	Fidesz	2 December 1935	–	Fidesz-KDNP National List, no. 14
175	Bence Tuzson	Fidesz	31 January 1972	Pest County 5.vk.	–
176	Zsolt V. Németh	Fidesz	12 July 1963	Vas County 3.vk.	–
177	dr. Ágnes Vadai	Independent	11 February 1974	–	Unity National List, no. 26
178	Sebestyén Vágó	Jobbik	1 September 1976	–	Jobbik National List, no. 21
179	Gyula Vantara	Fidesz	19 November 1954	Békés County 1.vk.	–
180	Gábor Varga	Fidesz	8 January 1968	Fejér County 5.vk.	–
181	József Varga	Fidesz	27 June 1962	–	Fidesz-KDNP National List, no. 65
182	dr. László Varga	MSZP	1 September 1979	Borsod-Abaúj-Zemplén County 2.vk.	–
183	Mihály Varga	Fidesz	26 January 1965	Budapest 4.vk.	–
184	Tamás Vargha	Fidesz	2 February 1959	Fejér County 1.vk.	–
185	László Varju from 30 June 2014	Independent	22 August 1961	Mandate of Csaba Molnár	
186	dr. Imre Vas	Fidesz	17 January 1966	Budapest 6.vk.	–
187	László Vécsey	Fidesz	1 September 1958	Pest County 6.vk.	–
188	dr. Imre Vejkey	KDNP	15 January 1964	–	Fidesz-KDNP National List, no. 64
189	Árpád Velez	MSZP	24 July 1977	–	Unity National List, no. 14
190	László Vigh	Fidesz	3 November 1961	Zala County 1.vk.	–
191	dr. Győző Vinnai	Fidesz	17 December 1959	Szabolcs-Szatmár-Bereg County 2.vk.	–
192	dr. István Vitányi	Fidesz	18 December 1952	Hajdú-Bihar County 4.vk.	–
193	János Volner	Jobbik	28 September 1968	–	Jobbik National List, no. 3
194	Gábor Vona	Jobbik	20 August 1978	–	Jobbik National List, no. 1
195	dr. Pál Völner	Fidesz	30 October 1962	Komárom-Esztergom County 2.vk.	–
196	Mihály Witzmann	Fidesz	2 June 1977	Somogy County 4.vk.	–
197	Dániel Z. Kárpát	Jobbik	1 June 1979	–	Jobbik National List, no. 6
198	Gábor Zombor	Fidesz	12 March 1964	Bács-Kiskun County 2.vk.	–
199	Róbert Zsigó	Fidesz	10 November 1967	Bács-Kiskun County 6.vk.	–
	Gordon Bajnai until 26 May 2014	Independent	5 March 1968	–	Unity National List, no. 2
	Zoltán Balczó until 20 June 2014	Jobbik	1 January 1948	–	Jobbik National List, no. 2
	dr. Csaba Molnár until 20 June 2014	Independent	4 December 1975	–	Unity National List, no. 19
	Róbert Rácz until 23 July 2014	Fidesz	31 December 1967	–	Fidesz-KDNP National List, no. 52
	Péter Kiss until 29 July 2014	MSZP	11 June 1959	Budapest 11.vk.	–
	dr. László Botka until 16 October 2014	MSZP	21 February 1973	–	Unity National List, no. 6
	Tibor Navracsics until 30 October 2014	Fidesz	13 June 1966	Veszprém County 1.vk.	–
	Jenő Lasztovicza until 8 January 2015	Fidesz	21 December 1961	Veszprém County 3.vk.	–
	dr. Ferenc Papcsák until 5 August 2015	Fidesz	19 February 1966	–	Fidesz-KDNP National List, no. 60
	Előd Novák until 31 August 2016	Jobbik	25 April 1980	–	Jobbik National List, no. 11
	András Schiffer until 5 September 2016	LMP	19 June 1971	–	LMP National List, no. 1
	dr. György Rubovszky until 21 June 2017	KDNP	1 February 1944	–	Fidesz-KDNP National List, no. 47

=== By parties of the Coalition Government ===
==== Fidesz ====
- Péter Ágh (Vas Constituency II.)
- László B. Nagy (Csongrád Const. II.)
- György Balla (National List)
- Mihály Balla (Nógrád Const. II.)
- Zoltán Balog (National List)
- Erik Bánki (National List)
- Gábor Bányai (Bács-Kiskun Const. V.)
- Mónika Bartos (National List)
- Zsolt Becsó (Nógrád Const. I.)
- János Bencsik (Komárom-Esztergom Const. I.)
- Ildikó Bene (Jász-Nagykun-Szolnok Const. I.)
- Márk Bíró (National List)
- Sándor Bodó (Hajdú-Bihar Const. V.)
- István Boldog (Jász-Nagykun-Szolnok Const. IV.)
- Zoltán Bóna (Pest Const. VIII.)
- Gyula Budai (National List)
- Zsolt Csenger-Zalán (Pest Const. II.)
- Péter Cseresnyés (Zala Const. III.)
- Péter Csizi (Baranya Const. I.)
- Katalin Csöbör (Borsod-Abaúj-Zemplén Const. I.)
- György Czerván (Pest Const. IX.)
- Sándor Czomba (National List)
- Judit Czunyi-Bertalan (Komárom-Esztergom Const. III.)
- Béla Dankó (Békés Const. II.)
- Zoltán Demeter (Borsod-Abaúj-Zemplén Const. IV.)
- Mónika Dunai (Budapest Const. XIV.)
- Flórián Farkas (National List)
- Sándor Farkas (Csongrád Const. III.)
- Sándor Fazekas (Jász-Nagykun-Szolnok Const. III.)
- János Fónagy (Budapest Const. III.)
- Sándor Font (Bács-Kiskun Const. III.)
- Dénes Galambos (Fejér Const. IV.)
- Attila Gelencsér (Somogy Const. I.)
- Gergely Gulyás (National List)
- Alpár Gyopáros (Győr-Moson-Sopron Const. III.)
- Balázs Győrffy (National List)
- Sándor Hadházy (Pest Const. III.)
- János Halász (National List)
- Csaba Hende (Vas Const. I.)
- Ferenc Hirt (Tolna Const. III.)
- Péter Hoppál (Baranya Const. II.)
- István Horváth (Tolna Const. I.)
- László Horváth (Heves Const. II.)
- Richárd Hörcsik (Borsod-Abaúj-Zemplén Const. V.)
- István Jakab (National List)
- Ákos Kara (Győr-Moson-Sopron Const. II.)
- János Kerényi (National List)
- Károly Kontrát (Veszprém Const. II.)
- Lajos Kósa (Hajdú-Bihar Const. I.)
- József Kovács (Békés Const. III.)
- Sándor Kovács (Szabolcs-Szatmár-Bereg Const. V.)
- Zoltán Kovács (Veszprém Const. IV.)
- László Kövér (National List)
- Gábor Kubatov (National List)
- László Kucsák (Budapest Const. XV.)
- László L. Simon (National List)
- Jenő Lasztovicza (Veszprém Const. III.)
- Tamás László (Budapest Const. XII.)
- János Lázár (Csongrád Const. IV.)
- Sándor Lezsák (Bács-Kiskun Const. IV.)
- Jenő Manninger (Zala Const. II.)
- Márta Mátrai (National List)
- Roland Mengyi (Borsod-Abaúj-Zemplén Const. VI.)
- Ágnes Molnár (National List)
- Tibor Navracsics (Veszprém Const. I.)
- István Nagy (Győr-Moson-Sopron Const. V.)
- Szilárd Németh (National List)
- Zsolt Németh (National List)
- Zsolt Nyitrai (Heves Const. I.)
- Viktor Orbán (National List)
- Ferenc Papcsák (National List)
- Károly Pánczél (Pest Const. XI.)
- Imre Pesti (National List)
- Attila Petneházy (Szabolcs-Szatmár-Bereg Const. I.)
- János Pócs (Jász-Nagykun-Szolnok Const. II.)
- Tibor Pogácsás (Pest Const. X.)
- László Pósán (Hajdú-Bihar Const. II.)
- Árpád Potápi (Tolna Const. II.)
- Róbert Rácz (National List)
- Róbert Répássy (National List)
- Máriusz Révész
- Gábor Riz (Borsod-Abaúj-Zemplén Const. III.)
- Antal Rogán (Budapest Const. I.)
- László Salacz (Bács-Kiskun Const. I.)
- Gabriella Selmeczi (National List)
- Miklós Simon (Szabolcs-Szatmár-Bereg Const. VI.)
- Róbert Balázs Simon (Győr-Moson-Sopron Const. I.)
- György Simonka (Békés Const. IV.)
- Zsolt Szabó (Heves Const. III.)
- Attila Szabolcs (Budapest Const. XVIII.)
- Kristóf Szatmáry (Budapest Const. XIII.)
- Péter Szijjártó (National List)
- Lajos Szűcs (Pest Const. VII.)
- András Tállai (Borsod-Abaúj-Zemplén Const. VII.)
- Gergely Tapolczai (National List)
- László Tasó (Hajdú-Bihar Const. III.)
- Zoltán Tessely (Fejér Const. III.)
- István Tiba (Hajdú-Bihar Const. VI.)
- Zsolt Tiffán (Baranya Const. IV.)
- Attila Tilki (Szabolcs-Szatmár-Bereg Const. IV.)
- Gábor Törő (Fejér Const. II.)
- Béla Turi-Kovács (National List)
- Bence Tuzson (Pest Const. V.)
- Zsolt V. Németh (Vas Const. III.)
- Gyula Vantara (Békés Const. I.)
- Gábor Varga (Fejér Const. V.)
- József Varga (National List)
- Mihály Varga (Budapest Const. IV.)
- Tamás Vargha (Fejér Const. I.)
- Imre Vas (Budapest Const. VI.)
- László Vécsey (Pest Const. VI.)
- László Vigh (Zala Const. I.)
- Győző Vinnai (Szabolcs-Szatmár-Bereg Const. II.)
- István Vitányi (Hajdú-Bihar Const. IV.)
- Pál Völner (Komárom-Esztergom Const. II.)
- Mihály Witzmann (Somogy Const. IV.)
- Gábor Zombor (Bács-Kiskun Const. II.)
- Róbert Zsigó (Bács-Kiskun Const. VI.)

==== KDNP ====
- András Aradszki (Pest Const. I.)
- Mátyás Firtl (Győr-Moson-Sopron Const. IV.)
- László Földi (Pest Const. XII.)
- János Hargitai (Baranya Const. III.)
- Péter Harrach (Pest Const. IV.)
- Rózsa Hoffmann (National List)
- István Hollik
- János Latorcai (National List)
- József Attila Móring (Somogy Const. III.)
- Bence Rétvári (National List)
- György Rubovszky (National List)
- Zsolt Semjén (National List)
- Miklós Seszták (Szabolcs-Szatmár-Bereg Const. III.)
- István Simicskó (Budapest Const. II.)
- Miklós Soltész (National List)
- László Szászfalvi (Somogy Const. II.)
- Imre Vejkey (National List)

=== Opposition parties ===
==== MSZP ====
- Ildikó Bangóné Borbély (National List)
- Gergely Bárándy (National List)
- László Botka (National List)
- Sándor Burány (Budapest Const. IX.)
- Zoltán Gőgös
- Nándor Gúr (National List)
- Gábor Harangozó (National List)
- Tamás Harangozó (National List)
- Anita Heringes (National List)
- István Hiller (Budapest Const. XVI.)
- Dezső Hiszékeny (Budapest Const. VII.)
- Imre Horváth (Budapest Const. XI.)*
- István Józsa (National List)
- László Kiss (Budapest Const. X.)
- Péter Kiss (Budapest Const. XI.)
- Lajos Korózs (National List)
- Ágnes Kunhalmi (National List)
- Zsolt Legény (National List)
- Zoltán Lukács (National List)
- Attila Mesterházy (National List)
- Zsolt Molnár (National List)
- Sándor Szabó (Csongrád Const. I.)
- László Szakács (National List)
- László Teleki (National List)
- József Tóbiás (National List)
- Bertalan Tóth (National List)
- Csaba Tóth (Budapest Const. VIII.)
- István Tukacs (National List)
- László Varga (Borsod-Abaúj-Zemplén Const. II.)
- Árpád Velez (National List)

==== Jobbik ====
- Balázs Ander (National List)
- István Apáti (National List)
- Zoltán Balczó (National List)
- Tibor Bana (National List)
- Dóra Dúró (National List)
- Zsolt Egyed (National List)
- Gergely Farkas (National List)
- Márton Gyöngyösi (National List)
- Csaba Gyüre (National List)
- Lórántné Hegedűs (National List)
- Lajos Kepli (National List)
- Gergely Kulcsár (National List)
- László György Lukács
- Zoltán Magyar (National List)
- Ádám Mirkóczki (National List)
- Előd Novák (National List)
- Tamás Pintér
- Lajos Rig (Veszprém Const. III)*
- Tamás Sneider (National List)
- Gábor Staudt (National List)
- István Szávay (National List)
- Sebestyén Vágó (National List)
- János Volner (National List)
- Gábor Vona (National List)
- Dániel Z. Kárpát (National List)

==== LMP ====
- Ákos Hadházy
- István Ikotity (National List)
- Márta Demeter (National List)
- Benedek Sallai R. (National List)
- András Schiffer (National List)
- Erzsébet Schmuck (National List)
- Bernadett Szél (National List)

==== Independents ====
- Zoltán Kész (Veszprém Const. I.)
- Péter Kónya (National List)

Együtt:

- Gordon Bajnai (National List)
- Szabolcs Szabó (Budapest Const. XVII.)
- Zsuzsanna Szelényi

Demokratikus Koalíció:

- Ferenc Gyurcsány (National List)
- Csaba Molnár (National List)
- Lajos Oláh (Budapest Const. V.)
- Ágnes Vadai (National List)
- László Varju

Párbeszéd:

- Tímea Szabó (National List)

MLP - Liberálisok!:

- Gábor Fodor (National List)

== Spokespersons of national minorities ==
Under the 2012 election law, the thirteen officially recognized national minorities are entitled to send minority spokespersons (Hungarian: nemzetiségi szószólók) to the National Assembly. They have the same rights as other parliamentarians to address the parliament, but are not entitled to vote.

- Lyubomir Alexov (Serb)
- Halina Csúcs-Pospiech (Polish)
- Félix Farkas (Romani)
- János Fuzik (Slovak)
- Vera Giricz (Rusyn)
- Jaroszlava Hartyányi (Ukrainian)
- Mihály Hepp (Croat)
- Erika Kissné Köles (Slovene)
- Laokratisz Koranisz (Greek)
- Traján Kreszta (Romanian)
- Imre Ritter (German)
- Tamás Turgyán (Armenian)
- Szimeon Varga (Bulgarian)

== See also ==
- Third Orbán Government
- List of Hungarian people
