= Törő =

Törő is a Hungarian surname. Notable people with the surname include:

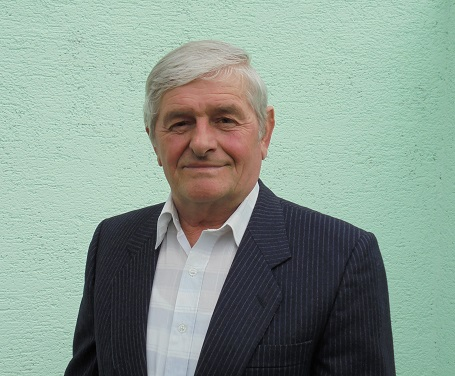
István Törő

- András Törő (born 1940), American canoer
- Gábor Törő (born 1962), Hungarian politician
- Gergely Zsolt Törő (born 1994), Hungarian actor
- Imre Törő (1900-1993), Hungarian doctor
- István Törő (born 1949), Hungarian writer
- Szabolcs Törő (born 1983), Hungarian handballer
