= Czomba =

Czomba is a surname. Notable people with the surname include:

- Imre Czomba, Hungarian-American musician
- Sándor Czomba, Hungarian parliamentarian
