= János Horváth =

János Horváth may refer to:

- János Horváth (politician) (1921 – 2019), Hungarian-American economist and politician
- John Horvath (mathematician) - (born János Horváth in 1924 – died 2015), Hungarian-American mathematician
