= Zoltán Kovács (politician, born 1957) =

Hungarian jurist and politician

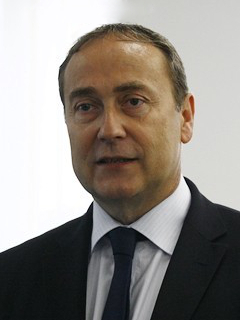

Member of the National Assembly
- In office 18 June 1998 – 31 May 2025

Personal details
- Born: 1 December 1957 (age 68) Zirc, Hungary
- Party: Fidesz (since 1988)
- Spouse: Dr Éva Klemph
- Children: Eszter; Zoltán
- Profession: jurist, politician

Zoltán Kovács (born 1 December 1957) is a Hungarian jurist and politician, member of the National Assembly (MP) for Pápa (Veszprém County's Constituency III then IV) from 1998 to 2025. Kovács also served as Mayor of Pápa between 1990 and 2011.

== Career ==
Kovács finished his secondary studies in the Türr István Grammar School in Pápa. He graduated from the Faculty of Law of the Eötvös Loránd University in 1982. He worked as a lawyer between 1982 and 1990 in Pápa.

Kovács was elected to the City Council of Pápa in 1985. He was one of the founders of the local branch of Fidesz in 1988. He is a member of the party's Electoral Board since 1993. He unsuccessfully ran for a legislative seat in the 1990 and 1994 parliamentary elections. He served as president of the Fidesz in Pápa between 1997 and 2000. He secured a seat as the joint candidate of the Fidesz and the Hungarian Democratic Forum (MDF) during the 1998 parliamentary election. He became president of the Fidesz in Veszprém County. He defended his mandate against Zoltán Gőgös during the 2002 parliamentary election. He was elected vice president of the Fidesz National Board on 28 March 2003. He served as chairman of the Parliamentary Committee on Local Government and Regional Development from 2010 to 2011.

Kovács was elected to the local government body during the 1990 municipal elections. He was appointed Mayor of Pápa in 1990. He held the office until 2011, when he was appointed Director of the Government Office of Veszprém County. He was succeeded as mayor by Tamás Áldozó on 6 March 2011. He was appointed Secretary of State for Territorial Public Administration within the Prime Minister's Office in June 2014, serving in that capacity until May 2018. He was re-elected MP for Pápa in the 2022 Hungarian parliamentary election. He served as vice-chairman of the Committee of Justice from 2018 to 2025.

In May 2025, Kovács was elected a member of the Supervisory Board of the Hungarian National Bank, and thus he resigned from his parliamentary seat. His seat remained vacant because the resignation occurred less than a year before the election.

== Personal life ==
Kovács is married to Éva Klemph. They have a daughter (Eszter) and a son (Zoltán).

Political offices
Preceded by Sándor Tóth as Chairman of the Council	Mayor of Pápa; 1990–2011	Succeeded by Tamás Áldozó
