= Béla Turi-Kovács =

Hungarian politician (1935–2023)

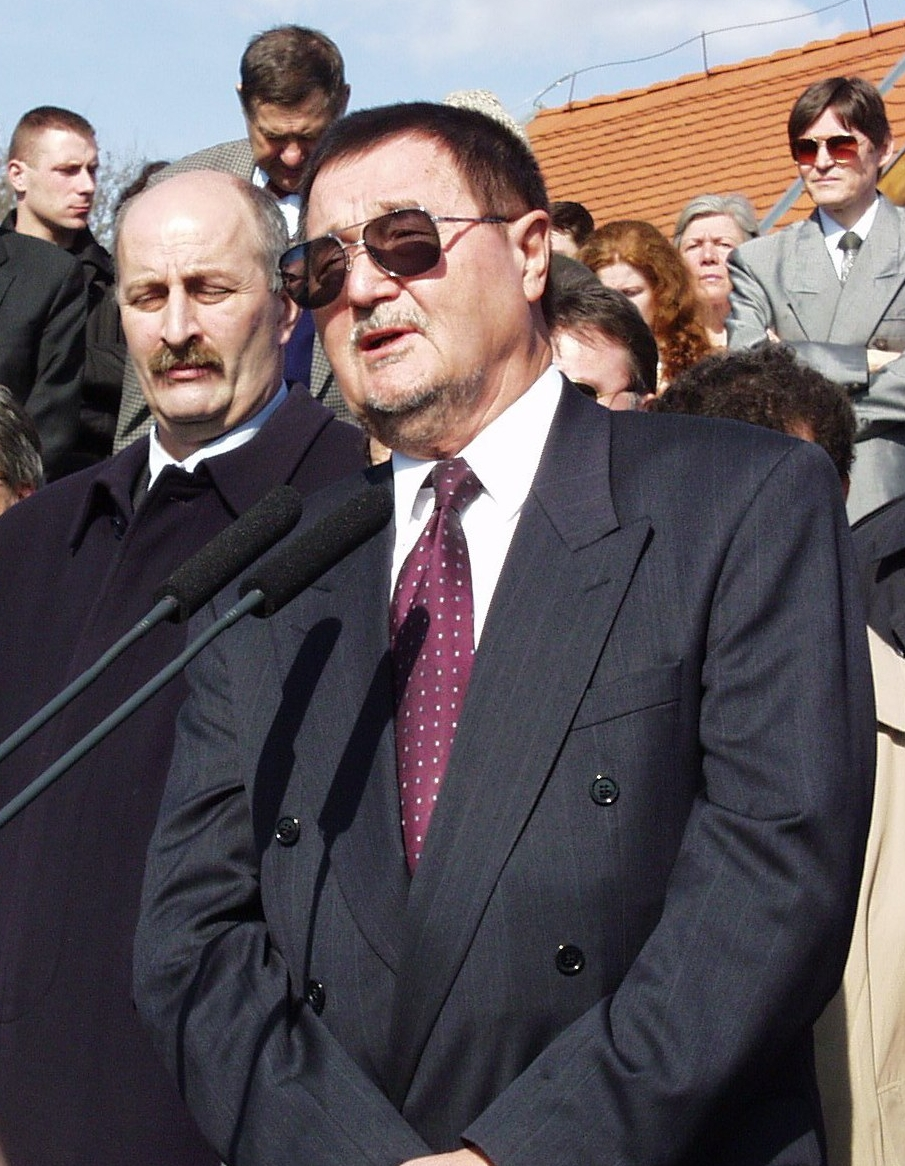
- Turi-Kovács in 2002

Minister of Environment
- In office 1 December 2000 – 27 May 2002
- Preceded by: Ferenc Ligetvári
- Succeeded by: Mária Kóródi; Environment and Water

Member of the National Assembly
- In office 18 June 1998 – 3 November 2023

Personal details
- Born: 2 December 1935 Endrőd, Hungary
- Died: 3 November 2023 (aged 87)
- Party: FKGP (1956; 1994–2001); MDF (1988–1990)
- Other political affiliations: Smallholders' Civil Association (Fidesz-ally)
- Children: 1
- Profession: jurist, politician

Béla Turi-Kovács (2 December 1935 – 3 November 2023) was a Hungarian politician, who served as Minister of Environment between 2000 and 2002. He was a member of the National Assembly from 1998 until his death. He was the Father of the House (oldest sitting MP) from 2014 thus he opened the inaugural sessions of the National Assembly in 2014, 2018 and 2022.

== Life and career ==
Béla Turi-Kovács was born in Endrőd, Hungary on 2 December 1935. In 1956 he was a member of the Independent Smallholders, Agrarian Workers and Civic Party. Turi-Kovács died on 3 November 2023, at the age of 87.

Political offices
Preceded by Ferenc Ligetvári	Minister of Environment; 2000–2002	Succeeded by Mária Kóródi; Environment and Water
Honorary titles
Preceded by János Horváth	Oldest sitting Member of Parliament; 2014–2023	Succeeded by János Fónagy
