= László Vigh =

Hungarian politician (born 1961)

Member of the National Assembly
- In office 16 May 2006 – 8 May 2026

Personal details
- Born: November 3, 1961 (age 64) Nagykanizsa, Hungary
- Party: Fidesz
- Profession: politician

László Vigh (born November 3, 1961) is a Hungarian politician, member of the National Assembly (MP) for Zalaszentgrót (Zala County Constituency V) from 2006 to 2014, and for Zalaegerszeg (Zala County Constituency I) from 2014 to 2026.

He attended elementary school in Pacsa and accomplished his studies in 1975. He passed the secondary school final examinations at Ganz Ábrahám Engineering and Transport Vocational Secondary School in Zalaegerszeg. He worked for the Fényforrás GE of Nagykanizsa from 1982 to 1986. From 1986 he continued his work in the Gelsei Farmers Cooperation.

From 1994 until 2014, he served as the mayor of Felsőrajk. Between 2002 and 2006 he was the Chairman of the Cultural Committee of the General Assembly of Zala County and member of the Committee on Sport and Youth. He was head of the Sport Association of Felsőrajk and leader of the village affairs of the Fidesz branch in Zala County. As a member of the parish church of Felsőrajk he is also an organiser of the local religious activity and head of the civil guard of the town. He is a founding member and member of the board of the recently founded Griff Puppet Theatre. During the parliamentary election held in 2006, he was elected MP for Zalaszentgrót. He was appointed member of the Local Government and Urban Development Committee on 30 May 2006, holding the office until 5 May 2014. He repeated his success as MP for Zalaszentgrót during the 2010 parliamentary election. Vigh was elected MP for Zalaegerszeg in the 2014, 2018 and 2022 parliamentary elections. He was a member of the Committee on Legal Affairs from May 2014 to May 2026. He also functioned as vice-chairman of the aforementioned committee from June 2022.

He did not run in the 2026 Hungarian parliamentary election.
