= Attila Barcza =

Hungarian politician (born 1985)

Member of the Hungarian Parliament
- In office 2018–2026
- Preceded by: Mátyás Firtl
- Succeeded by: Anikó Hallerné Nagy
- Constituency: Győr-Moson-Sopron 4th

Personal details
- Born: 20 February 1985 (age 41)
- Party: Fidesz

Attila Barcza (born 20 February 1985) is a Hungarian politician and teacher.

== Political career ==
Barcza was elected to the Hungarian Parliament in 2018 and 2022 in Győr-Moson-Sopron County 4th constituency.
