= Csaba Gyüre =

Hungarian lawyer and politician

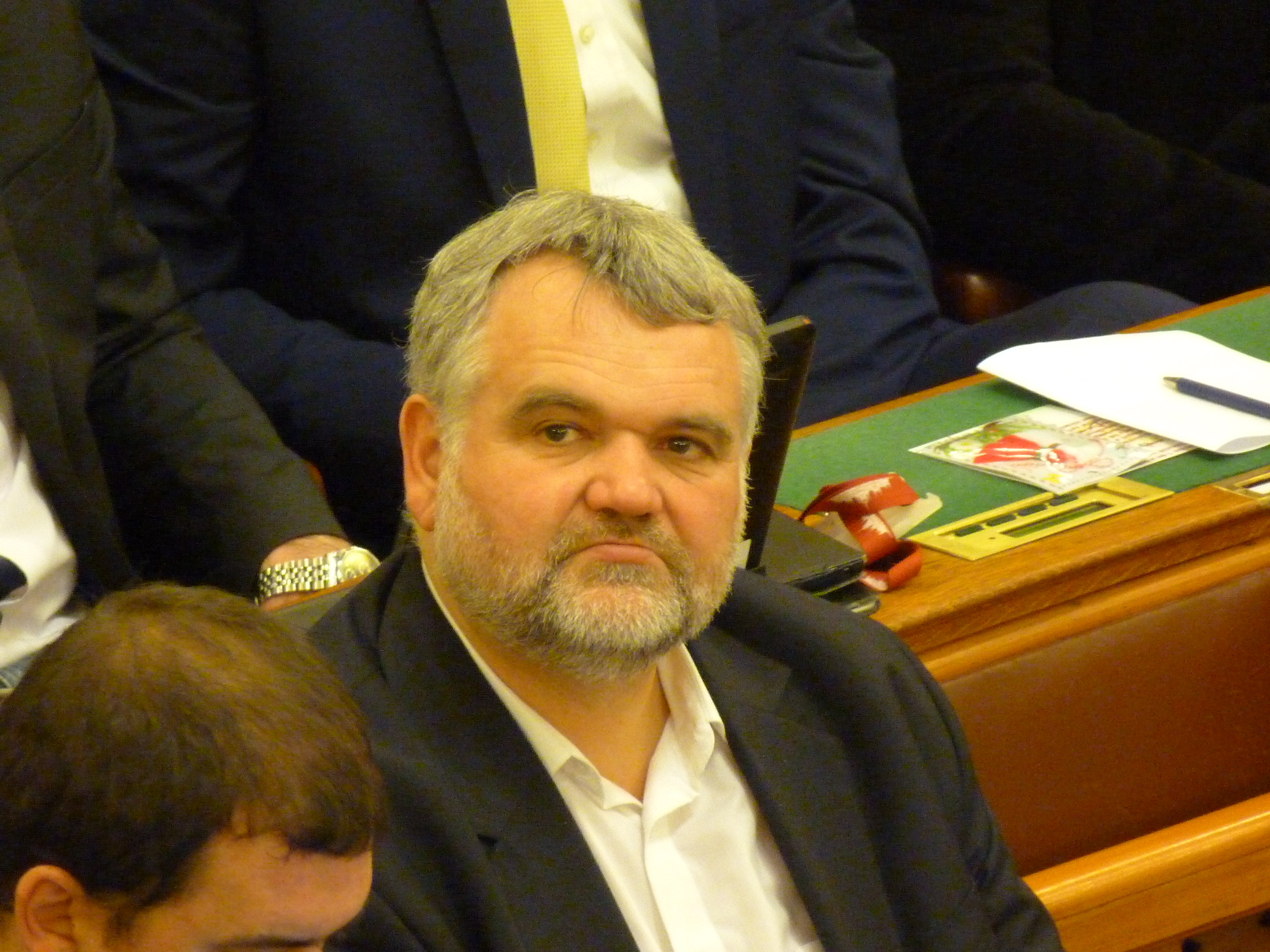
- Gyüre in 2016

Member of the National Assembly
- In office 1 April 2019 – 1 May 2022
- In office 14 May 2010 – 7 May 2018

Personal details
- Born: 19 May 1965 (age 60) Kisvárda, Hungary
- Citizenship: Hungary
- Party: Jobbik
- Occupation: Hungarian lawyer and politician

Csaba Gyüre (born in Kisvárda, Hungary on 19 May 1965) is a Hungarian lawyer and politician. He was a member of parliament in the National Assembly of Hungary (Országgyűlés) from 2010 to 2018, and from 2019 to 2022, as a politician of the Jobbik.

== Early life and career ==
He graduated from the György Bessenyei Grammar School in Kisvárda in 1983. Between 1984 and 1989 he was a full-time student at the Faculty of Law of Eötvös Loránd University. He graduated in law in February 1989. Already during his university years, he lived an active political life, participating in opposition events. In 1988, he participated in the founding of the Hungarian Democratic Forum organization.. After graduating, he worked in public administration in various positions. He served as a lawyer at a law firm between 3 January 1993 and 1995. In 1996, he graduated from the Faculty of Arts of the Lajos Kossuth University with a degree in history.

== Career ==
He was a member of the Hungarian Justice and Life Party since 2001. In the parliamentary elections of 2002, he ran as a candidate Hungarian Justice and Life Party in Nyíregyháza. He was expelled from the party after the election. He joined the Jobbik in 2003, and has been a member of the party since 2004. In 2010 and 2014, he entered the National Assembly of Hungary from the party's Szabolcs–Szatmár–Bereg County regional list then its national list, respectively, but did not win a seat in the 2018 election. After the resignation of Enikő Hegedűs, Gyüre was appointed into the National Assembly. He took his oath of office on 1 April 2019.
