= István Tukacs =

Hungarian politician

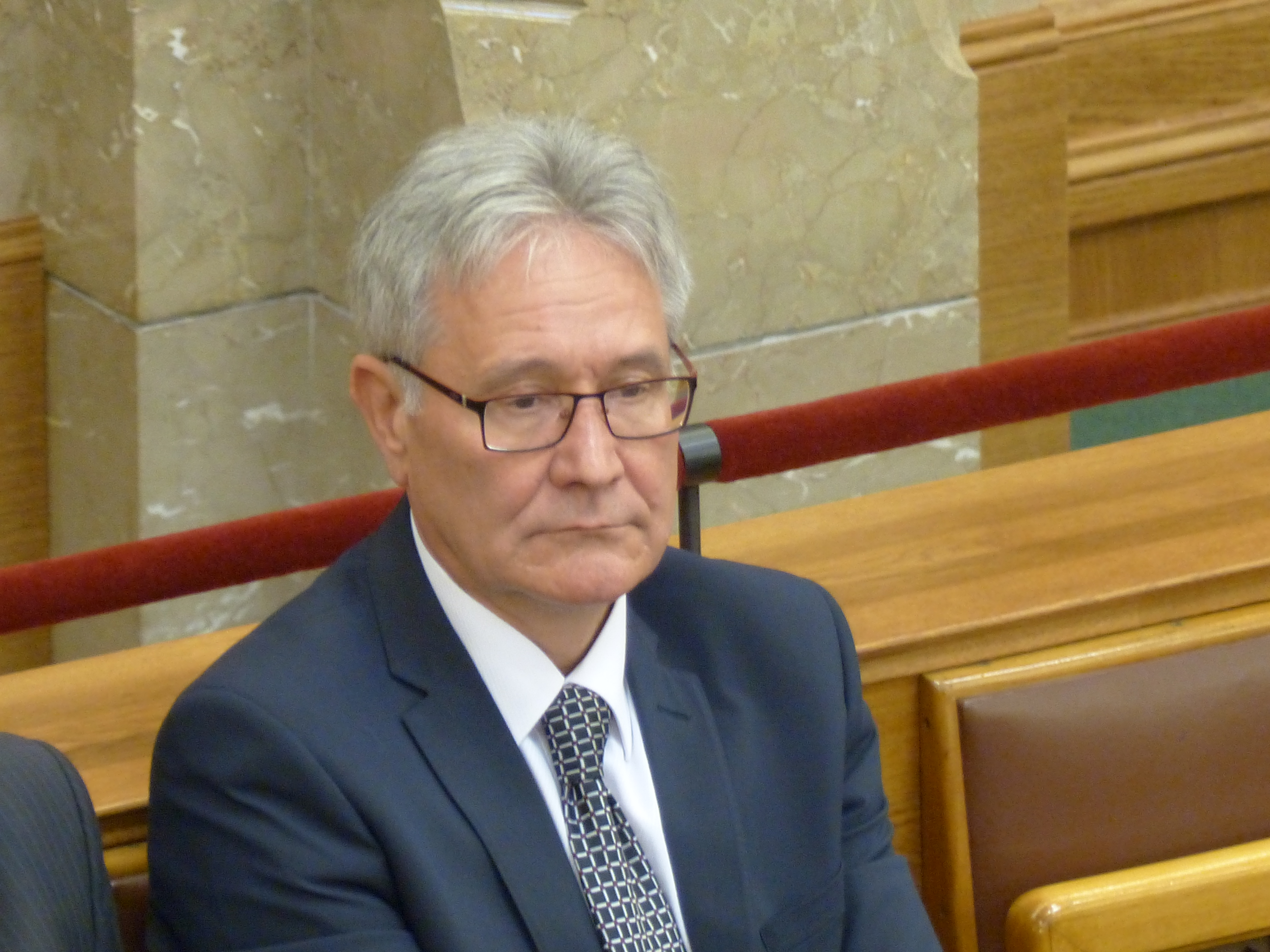
- István Tukacs in 2016

Member of the National Assembly
- In office 16 May 2006 – 7 May 2018

Personal details
- Born: 10 July 1958 (age 67) Nyíregyháza, Hungary
- Party: MSZP (since 1989)
- Other political affiliations: KISZ (1984-1989)
- Profession: politician

István Tukacs (born 10 July 1958) is a Hungarian politician, member of the National Assembly (MP) for Nyíregyháza (Szabolcs-Szatmár-Bereg County Constituency II) from 2006 to 2010. He was also a Member of Parliament from the national list of the Hungarian Socialist Party (MSZP) between 2010 and 2018; he was also a founding member of the party.
