= Gabriella Selmeczi =

Hungarian jurist and politician

Member of the National Assembly
- In office 28 June 1994 – 8 May 2026

Personal details
- Born: 21 June 1965 (age 60) Budapest, Hungary
- Party: Fidesz (since 1990)
- Children: 2
- Profession: jurist, politician

Dr. Gabriella Selmeczi (born 21 June 1965) is a Hungarian jurist and politician, member of the National Assembly (MP) from 1994 to 2026. She was a long-time spokesperson of the Fidesz.

== Biography ==
Selmeczi was born in Budapest on 21 June 1965. She finished her secondary studies in her birthplace in 1983 and started her career in her parents' family business, where she worked for two years. She graduated as a business administrator from the College of Commerce and Catering in 1989. She obtained her next degree in journalism from Vitéz János Teacher's Training College in Esztergom where she studied from 1990 to 1991. She worked as an editor and reporter for the Municipal Television of Budaörs in 1990 and 1991. She was the managing director of Intereska Trading Ltd. from 1991 until summer 1994. Parallel to her work as an MP, she graduated as a lawyer at Pázmány Péter Catholic University.

She founded the Budaörs branch of Fidesz in 1990. In the following year, she was elected to the party's local government advisory board and later the party's local government committee. She was a member of the party's National Board from 1992 until 1994. She was vice-president of the party from 1993 until 1994. From 1993 to 2003, she was president of the party's Pest County branch. She was appointed regional commissioner in autumn 2003. She is one of the founders of the Foundation for a World without Cancer. In 2003, she launched a series of auctions aimed to provide support for children with cancer.

Selmeczi was elected to the General Assembly of Budaörs from the party's list in the 1990 local elections. She was MP from 1994 to 2026. She was elected from the party's Pest County Regional List in the 1994 Hungarian parliamentary election. She represented Budaörs (Pest County Constituency IX) between 1998 and 2002. She was parliamentary secretary of the Prime Minister's Office for social security funds from 1998 until 1999. She resigned after the "Lockheed scandal". She was deputy leader of the party's parliamentary group from February 2000 until the end of the parliamentary term. She secured a seat in Parliament from her party's Pest County Regional List in the 2002 parliamentary election. She was elected deputy chair of the Committee on Health in mid-May 2002. She was deputy leader of her party's parliamentary group in the Parliament. In the general elections held in 2006 and 2010, she was elected from the Pest County Regional List. She was elected member of the Economic and Information Technology Committee on 30 May 2006. Selmeczi was appointed Commissioner in defense of people's savings in October 2010.

Selmeczi was re-elected MP via Fidesz–KDNP national list in the 2014 and 2018 parliamentary elections. She was a member of the Legislative Committee from 2014 to 2018 and of the Welfare Committee from 2014 to 2026. She served as Chairperson of the latter committee from 2014 to 2018. After the 2026 Hungarian parliamentary election, where Fidesz–KDNP suffered a heavy defeat and fell from power, Selmeczi did not take up her mandate.

== Controversy ==
Népszava learned in May 1999 that state secretaries Selmeczi, István Balsay, and MP Béla Gyuricza sent a letter to U.S. Senators Jesse Helms and Joe Biden. The letter, signed by 31 Fidesz MPs, asked the senators to appoint Steven M. Jones, a high-ranking financial manager of Lockheed Martin, as the next United States Ambassador to Hungary. CNN reported on the event, and there was considerable pressure on Prime Minister Viktor Orbán to do something. The scandal even reached the White House and the United States State Department. Bill Clinton and Madeleine Albright expressed their total confidence in Ambassador Peter Tufo, who still had two years to go. Balsay and Selmeczi resigned in 1999.
