= Máriusz Révész =

Hungarian politician

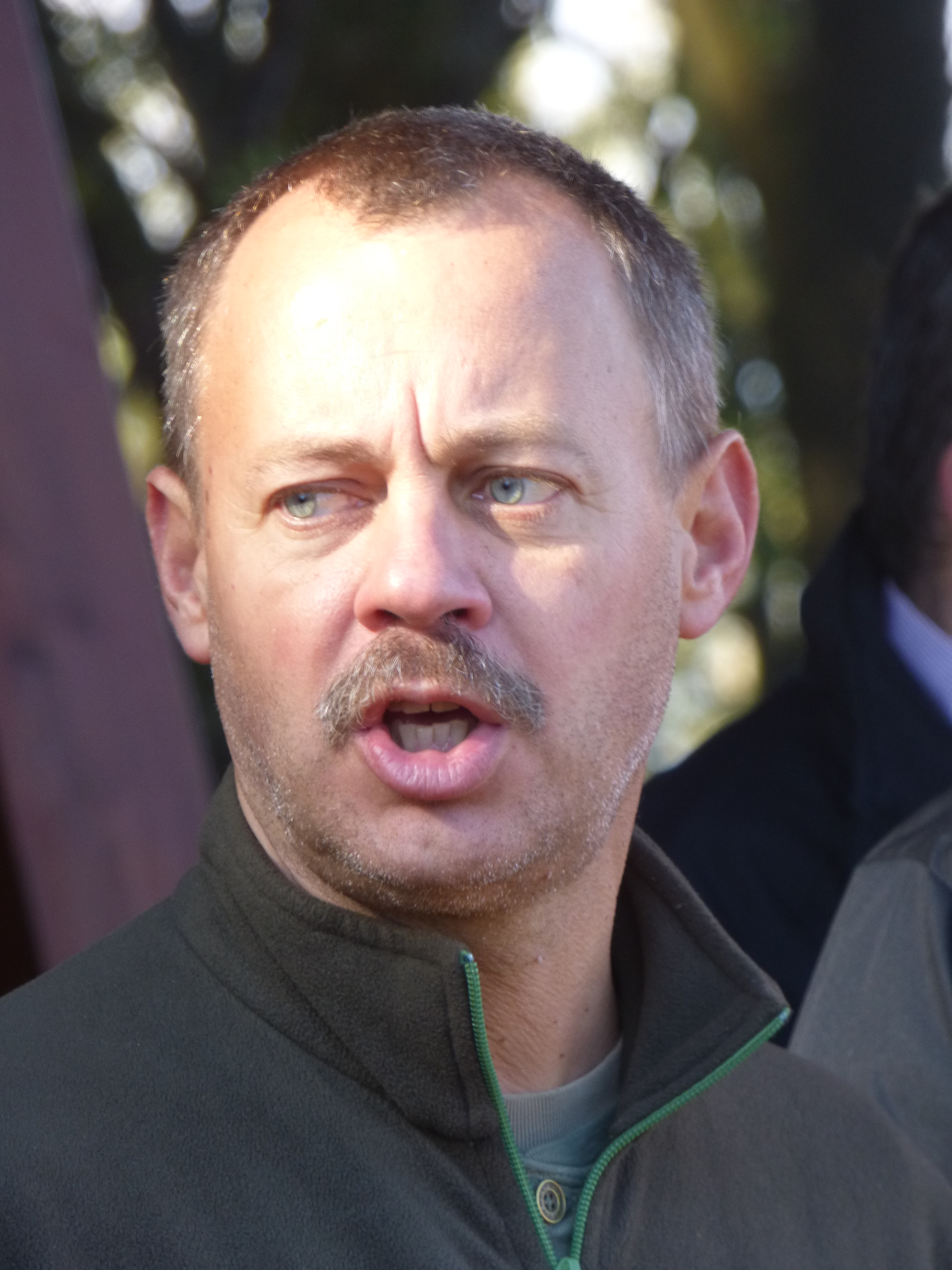

Member of the National Assembly
- In office 15 September 2014 – 1 May 2022
- In office 18 June 1998 – 5 May 2014

Personal details
- Born: 31 May 1967 (age 59) Budapest, Hungary
- Party: Fidesz (since 1988)
- Spouse: Adél Németh
- Children: Hunor; Regő; Bercel; Nimród
- Profession: politician

Máriusz Révész (born 31 May 1967, in Budapest) is a Hungarian politician of the Fidesz party and a former Member of the Parliament.

== Youth ==
His family originate from Kőbánya, Budapest. He finished his secondary studies at the I. László Gymnasium in 1985. Révész attended the Ho Si Minh Teacher Training College (present-day Eszterházy Károly Catholic University) in Eger from 1985 to 1989. He was involved in the local democratic opposition movement, when joined the Agria Circle, which challenged the dominance of the Hungarian Young Communist League (KISZ) within the collage. Based on this group, Révész became a founding member of the local branch of Fidesz in the autumn of 1988. Révész organized protests in order to rename the college from Ho Chi Minh to Bishop Károly Eszterházy at the turn of 1988 and 1989. Thereafter, Révész taught mathematics in an elementary school in Kőbánya.

== Political career ==
After the Fall of Communism in Hungary he entered the local government of Kőbánya (the 10th district of Budapest) shortly after the first free elections in 1990, retaining the position until 1998. In 1991 he became the chairman of the local Fidesz branch in the same district. During the internal disputes within Fidesz between 1993 and 1994, Révész supported the liberal wing led by Gábor Fodor, but did not follow him, when Fodor, after his defeat against Viktor Orbán, left Fidesz and joined Alliance of Free Democrats (SZDSZ).

He was first elected as a member of the Hungarian Parliament in 1998. He was reelected in 2002, 2006, and 2010, serving four terms. Révész was a representative of the local government of the 10th district from 2006 to 2014. Révész did not secure a parliamentary mandate in the 2014 parliamentary election, however he became a Member of Parliament again in September 2014, when he replaced Róbert Rácz. He was re-elected in 2018, but did not secure a mandate in the 2022 Hungarian parliamentary election. In the parliament, Révész was a member of the Committee on Education and Science from 1998 to 2014 and of the Welfare Committee from 2015 to 2022. Beside that, he also worked in the Committee of Non-Governmental Organizations from 1998 to 2002, the Committee on Youth and Sport in 2002, the Committee on Human Rights, Minorities, Civil and Religious Affairs from 2010 to 2011, the Committee on National Cohesion from 2011 to 2012, the Committee on Sport and Tourism from 2013 to 2014 and the Legislative Committee from 2014 to 2016.

On 23 October 2006, during the protests against the Socialist government, he was attacked by riot police officers without identification number while trying to mediate between police and a crowd during the Gyurcsány cabinet. The attackers were not found but two policemen were charged as accomplices because they did not do anything to help Révész at the time he was attacked. They were convicted in April 2011 to one year in jail, the sentence was suspended.

Révész was appointed government commissioner responsible for the development and promotion of cycling and active recreation in June 2016.

== Personal life ==
He is married. His wife is Adél Németh. They have four sons, Hunor, Regő, Bercel and Nimród.
