= Róbert Rácz =

Hungarian politician

Member of the National Assembly
- In office 15 May 2002 – 23 July 2014

Personal details
- Born: 31 December 1967 (age 58) Miskolc, Hungary
- Party: Fidesz
- Spouse: Kriszta Ráczné Éles
- Children: Kristóf; Soma Róbert
- Profession: politician

Róbert Rácz (born 31 December 1967) is a Hungarian politician, member of the National Assembly (MP) from Fidesz Hajdú-Bihar County Regional List from 2002 to 2014, and from his party's national list for a short time in 2014.

He served as President of the General Assembly of Hajdú-Bihar County between 2006 and 2011. He was appointed Director of the Hajdú-Bihar County Government Office on 1 January 2011. He was elected MP in 2014, thus he resigned from this office due to the new rules of incompatibility. However, he was appointed Director of the Government Office again in July 2014, as a result he was replaced as MP by Máriusz Révész.

== Personal life ==
He is married. His wife is Kriszta Ráczné Éles. They have two sons, Kristóf and Soma Róbert.
