= Ágnes Molnár =

Hungarian politician (born 1956)

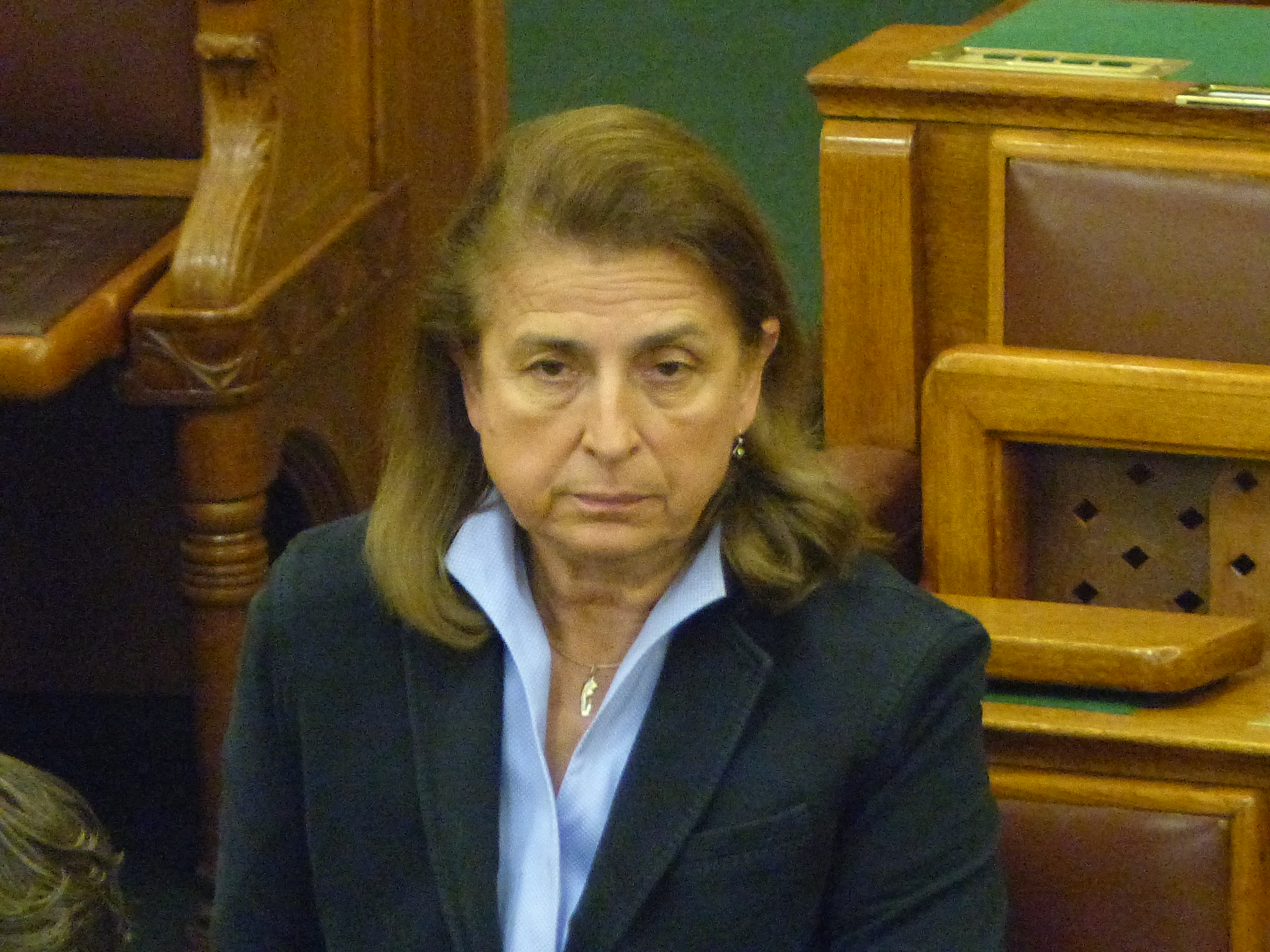

Member of the National Assembly
- In office 16 May 2006 – 8 May 2026

Personal details
- Born: 12 May 1956 (age 70) Szeged, Hungary
- Party: Fidesz (since 2003)
- Profession: physician

Dr. Ágnes Molnár (born 12 May 1956) is a Hungarian politician, member of the National Assembly (MP) from Fidesz Győr-Moson-Sopron County Regional List from 2006 to 2014, and her party's national list from 2014 to 2026. She served as Secretary of State for National Development between 2 June 2010 and 29 June 2012.

== Career ==
She attended the Radnóti Miklós Secondary School in Szeged and passed the secondary school final examinations in 1974. She graduated as a medical doctor from the University of Medical Sciences of Szeged with laudable diploma in 1980. After her graduation, she began her work in the children's ward of the State Sanatorium in Sopron in 1980. She worked for the children's ward of Erzsébet hospital in Sopron from 1982. She accomplished her special studies of paediatrics and infant medicine with excellent results in 1985. Parallel to her duties of the children's ward, she also worked for years as a paediatrician for neighbouring settlements. She provided medical treatment for children suffering from renal disease and helped to establish the County health children's home. She was also responsible for years as a medical doctor for state cared children in two children's home of Sopron. In 1992 she began a private practice with her husband. She is a director of Arcus ker. Ltd. from 1998 and managing director of Régióturizmus Ltd. from 2001.

She has been a supporter of Fidesz since 1997, and a member since 2003. She was a member of the local General Assembly of Sopron, chairperson of the Health and Social Committee from 2002 to 2006. From 2003 she helped the party as a coordinator of the party president and then as a political director Northern-Transdanubia. She secured a seat in Parliament during the 2006 parliamentary election from Győr-Moson-Sopron County Regional List. She was elected member of the Committee on Health Affairs on 30 May 2006. She was a member of the Committee of Welfare from May 2014 to May 2022. After the 2022 Hungarian parliamentary election, she functioned as appointed vice-chairperson of the Committee of Economics between 2022 and 2026. After the 2026 Hungarian parliamentary election, where Fidesz–KDNP suffered a heavy defeat and fell from power, Molnár did not take up her mandate.
