= Gergely Tapolczai =

Hungarian politician

Member of the National Assembly
- In office 14 May 2010 – 8 May 2026

Personal details
- Born: 21 December 1975 (age 50)
- Party: Fidesz
- Children: 3
- Profession: jurist, politician

Dr. Gergely Tapolczai (born December 21, 1975) is a Hungarian politician, member of the National Assembly (MP) from the National List of Fidesz from 2010 to 2026. The deaf politician is the first user of Sign language in the Hungarian parliament. He was elected to the European Union of the Deaf (EUD) as a board member in 2009, and served as the vice-president of the EUD until resigning on February 5, 2021.

He was a member of the Committee for Youth, Social, Family, and Housing Affairs from May 14, 2010, to May 5, 2014, and Committee on Sport and Tourism from February 14, 2011, to May 5, 2014. He became Chairman of the Subcommittee for People with Disabilities on June 28, 2010. He was also a member of the Welfare Committee since 2014 and Legislative Committee since 2015. Although he was elected as MP via his party's national list in the 2026 Hungarian parliamentary election, he did not take up his parliamentary mandate.

He supports and promotes the United Nations Convention on Rights of People with Disabilities (UNCRPD) to EU member states and talks about the Hungarian Sign Language Act.
