= József Varga (politician, born 1962) =

Hungarian politician

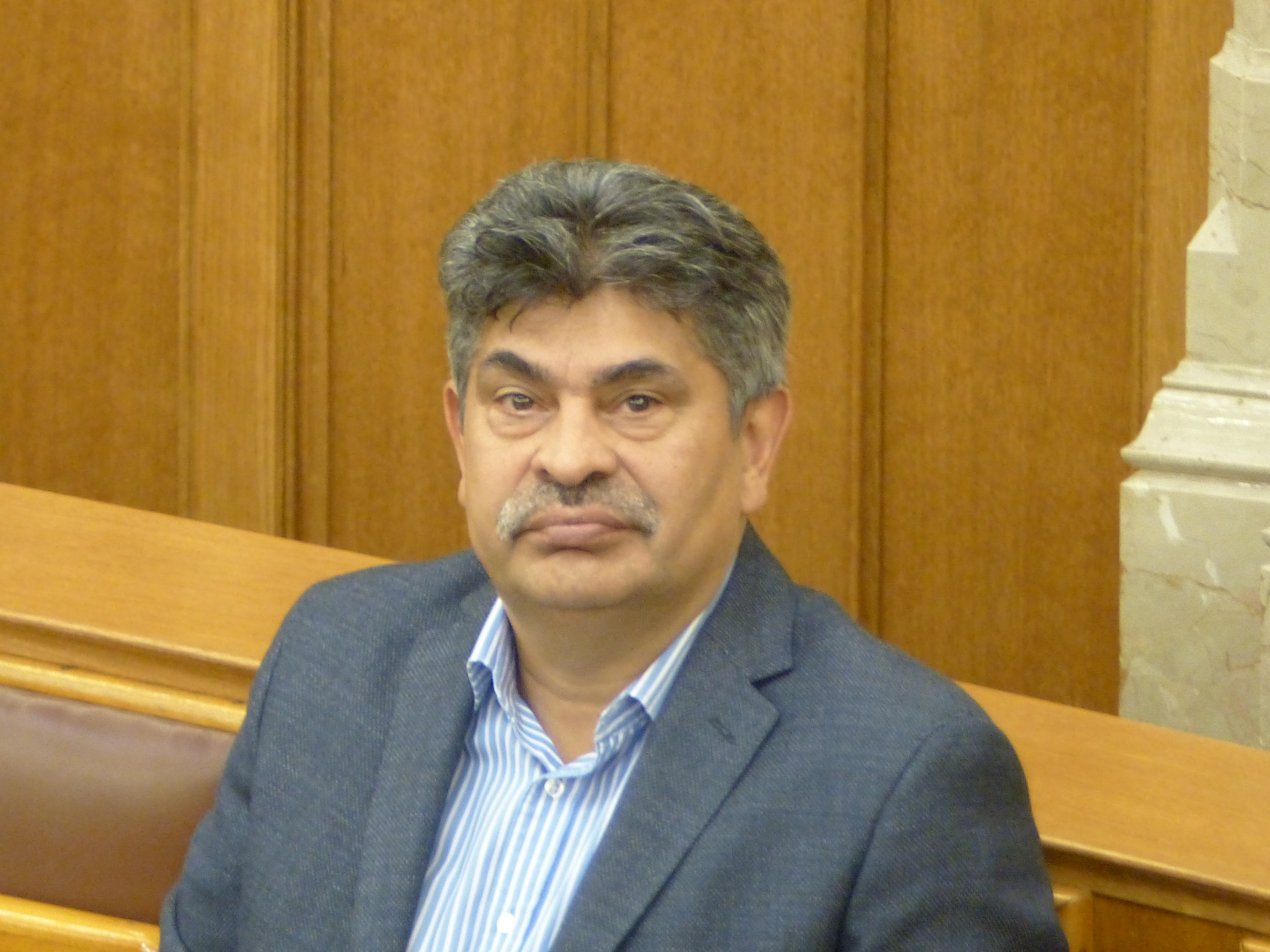

Member of the National Assembly
- In office 15 May 2002 – 7 May 2018

Personal details
- Born: June 27, 1962 (age 63) Csenger, Hungary
- Party: Fidesz
- Spouse: Etelka Palich
- Children: 3
- Profession: politician

József Varga (born 27 June 1962) is a Hungarian politician of Romani ethnicity, member of the National Assembly (MP) from Budapest Regional List between 2010 and 2014. He was also MP from the National List of Fidesz between 2002 and 2010, and from 2014 to 2018.

He served as a member of the Committee on Human Rights, Minority, Civic and Religious Affairs from 2002 to 2010. He was appointed Vice Chairman of Committee on Employment and Labour on 14 May 2010, holding the position until 5 May 2014. He was a member of the Committee on Legal Affairs between 2014 and 2018.

Varga was a prominent politician in Ferencváros (9th district of Budapest) until 2019, described as "gray eminence" behind mayor János Bácskai since 2010. In a series of articles published since the spring of 2017, news portal 444.hu revealed a number of adverse cases related to the management of the district (parking money, housing allowances etc), which connected to Varga and his uncovered network of contacts. One of his fellow Fidesz politicians described Varga as "an uneducated man, but he is unparalleled in cunning and caution, and has more wit than the whole Fidesz faction combined". As a result of the series of articles, the Fidesz did not launch Varga in an individual district and placed his name in a disadvantaged place on the national list during the 2018 parliamentary election. Varga lost all political influence in the 2019 local elections, when Bácskai was defeated by opposition mayoral candidate Krisztina Baranyi, whose alliance also gained a majority in the district council.
