= János Kerényi =

Hungarian jurist and politician

Member of the National Assembly
- Incumbent
- Assumed office 18 June 1998

Personal details
- Born: 9 December 1945 (age 80) Kiskunhalas, Hungary
- Party: Fidesz (since 1996)
- Children: 2
- Profession: jurist

Dr. János Kerényi (born December 9, 1945) is a Hungarian jurist and politician, member of the National Assembly (MP) from Fidesz Bács-Kiskun County Regional List from 1998 to 2014, and from his party's national list since 2014.

He was a member of the Constitutional, Judicial and Standing Orders Committee since 2011. Therefore, he participated in the drawing up of the new constitution in 2011.

== Personal life ==
He is married and has two children.
