= Mónika Bartos =

Hungarian politician

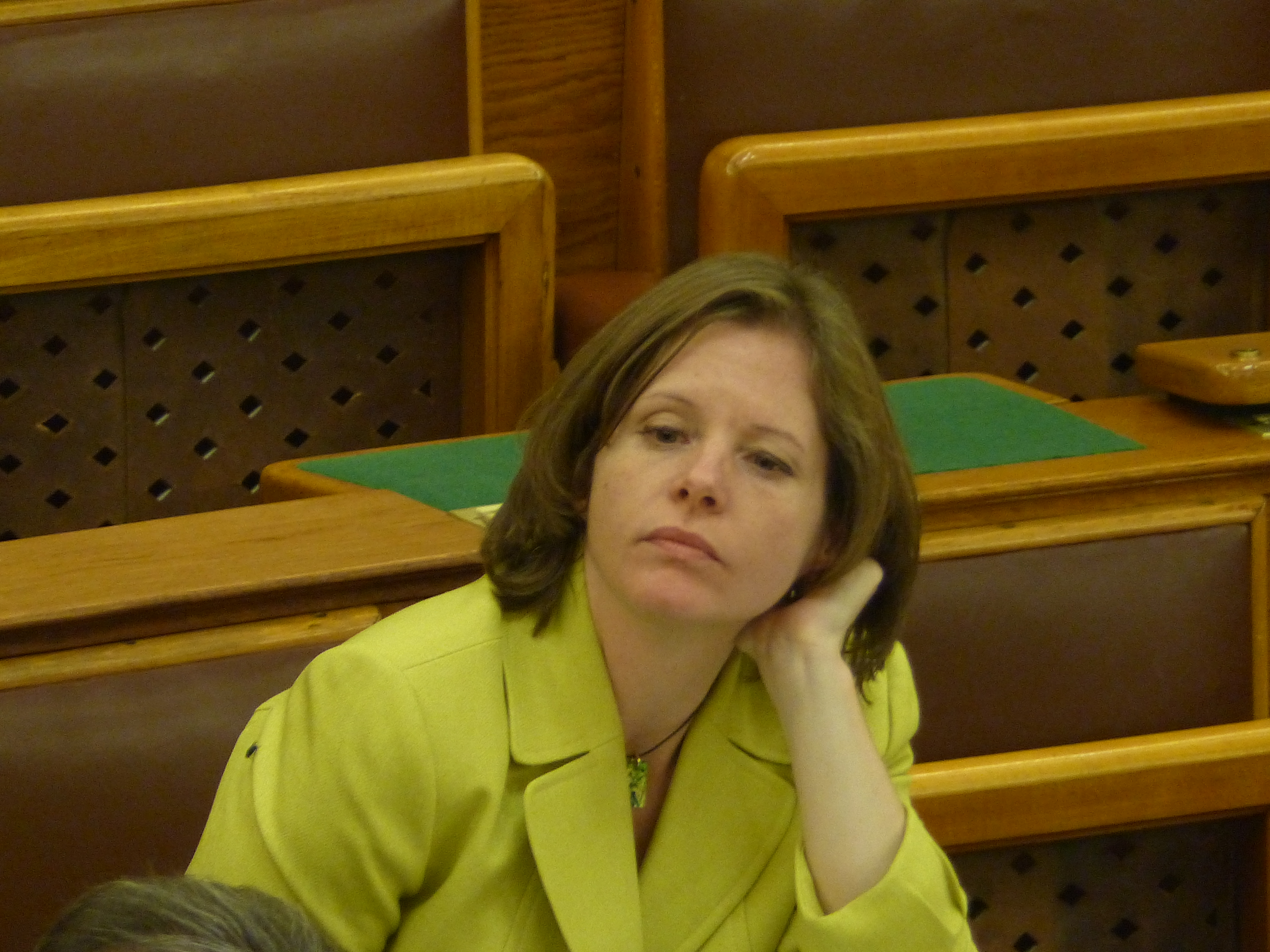

Member of the National Assembly
- Incumbent
- Assumed office 14 May 2010

Personal details
- Born: 24 December 1975 (age 50) Budapest, Hungary
- Party: National Forum (Fidesz-ally)
- Profession: politician

Mónika Bartos (born 24 December 1975) is a Hungarian politician, member of the National Assembly (MP) from Regional List of Hajdú-Bihar County between 2010 and 2014, and the Fidesz–KDNP national list since 2014.

She was appointed a member of the Committee on Sustainable Development on 14 May 2010, serving in this capacity until 7 May 2018. Following that she became vice-chairperson of the Committee on Budgets.
