= Zoltán Lukács =

Hungarian politician

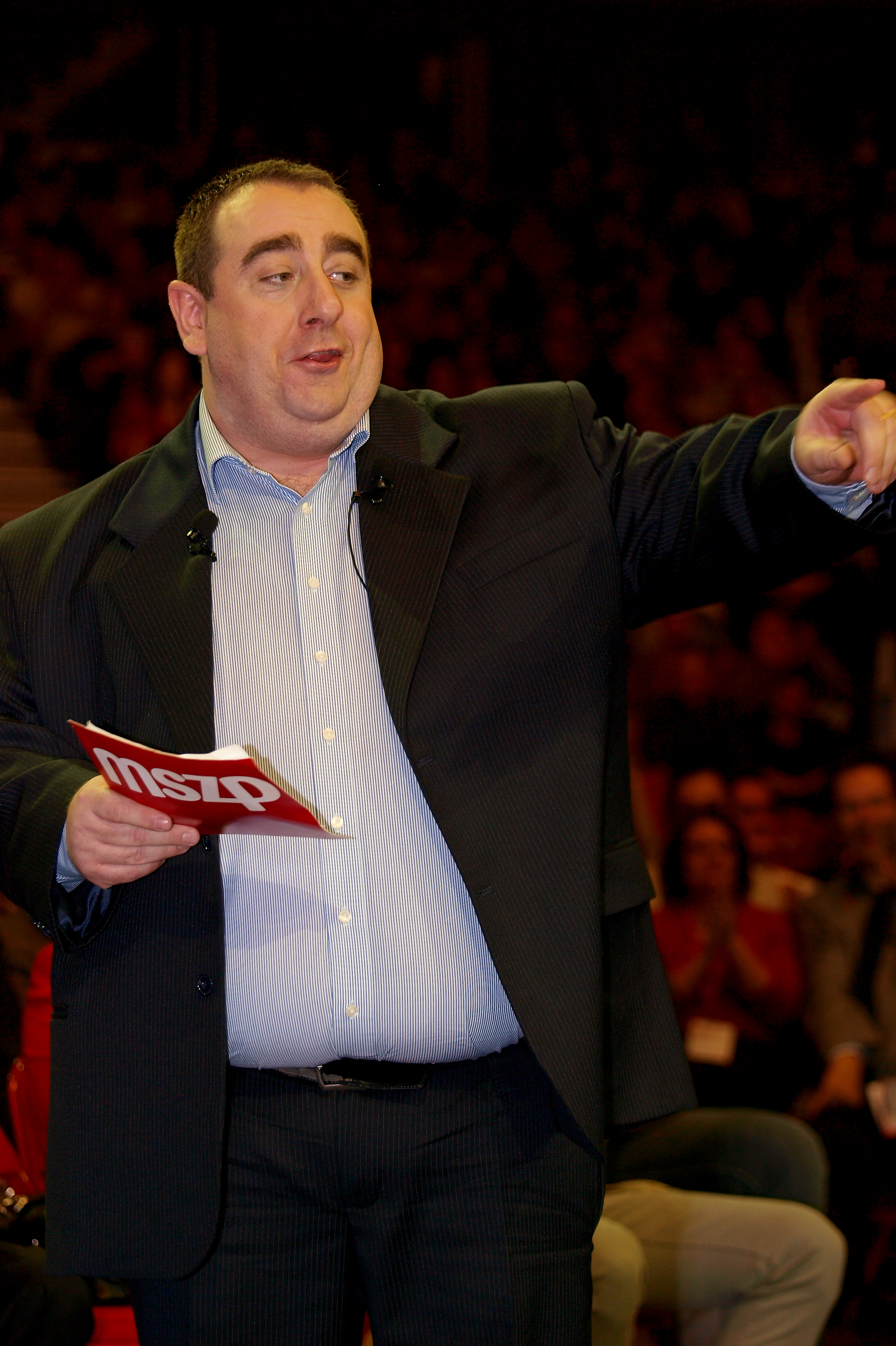

Member of the National Assembly
- In office 15 May 2006 – 7 May 2018

Personal details
- Born: 24 April 1969 (age 56) Budapest, Hungary
- Party: MSZP (since 1993)
- Profession: politician

Zoltán Lukács (born 24 April 1969) is a Hungarian politician who was a member of the National Assembly from the Hungarian Socialist Party's Komárom-Esztergom County Regional List from 2006 to 2014, and from its national list from 2014 to 2018.

After he had completed his primary schooling studies at the Mező Imre Primary School in Tatabánya he obtained a skilled worker certificate at the Commercial and Catering Industry Secondary School. Beside his work he finished Mikes Kelemen Secondary School. In 2005 he graduated with a very good record from the Faculty of Arts (communication field) of University of Szeged.

He has been a member of the Hungarian Socialist Party (MSZP) since 1993. Before he was president of the Left-wing Youth Association of Komárom-Esztergom County and he was a member of national presidium. He was the president of Tatabánya City's Branch of MSZP and Komárom-Esztergom County's Regional Association. In the second cycle he was a member of Komárom-Esztergom County's General Assembly and he worked as an adviser of the Child-, Youth- and Civil Organizations.

In the 2006 parliamentary election he obtained a mandate from Komárom-Esztergom County Regional List. He was a member of the Committee on Cultural and Press Affairs between 30 May 2006 and 1 June 2010. He was appointed a member of the Committee on Local Government and Regional Development on 14 May 2010.
