= Anita Heringes =

Hungarian politician (born 1984)

Heringes Anita
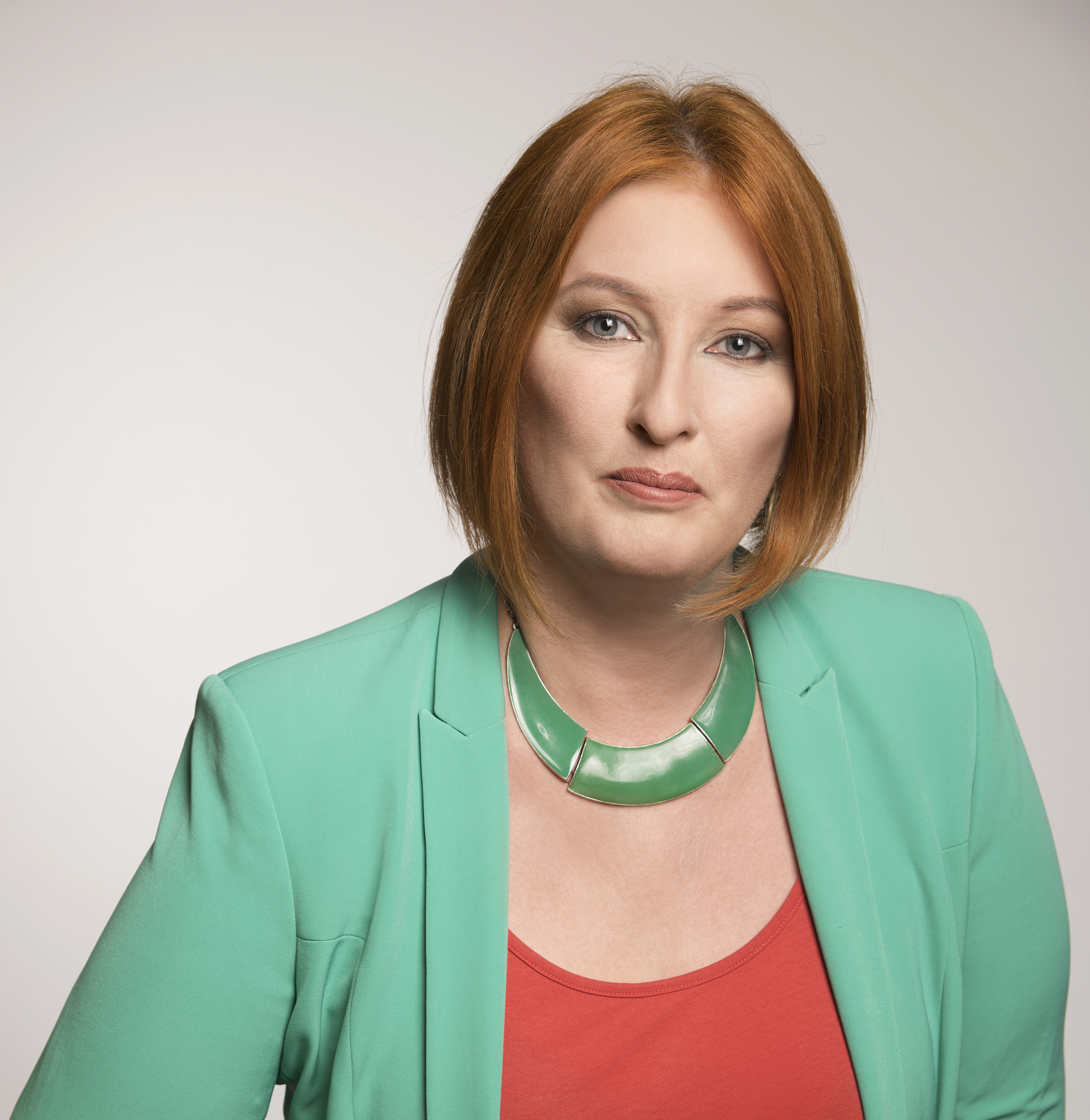

Member of Parliament
- In office 2014–2018

Personal details
- Born: 22 August 1984 (age 42) Szekszárd, Hungary
- Party: Hungarian Socialist Party
- Education: University of Szeged

Anita Heringes (born 22 August 1984) is a Hungarian politician. She served as a Member of Parliament of the Hungarian Socialist Party Member of Parliament for the opening session, and an of the Committee on Sustainable Development from 2014 to 2018.

== Education ==
She completed her public education studies at the Ferenc Móra Primary School in Paks and then at the Vak Bottyán Grammar School in Paks.

In 2004 she was admitted to the University of Szeged Department of Communication of the Faculty where she graduated in 2009. The subject of the dissertation was campaign marketing and campaign communication.

== Political career ==
She began her political career in the Hungarian Socialist Party youth section in 2003. Since 2008 of the Societas - Left Youth Movement Vice President In 2012 the Hungarian Socialist Party in Paks.

In 2014, on 17 September she has been a member of the Subcommittee on Environmental Health, Safety and the Environment of the Committee on Sustainable Development.
