= János Horváth (politician) =

Hungarian economist and politician (1921–2019)

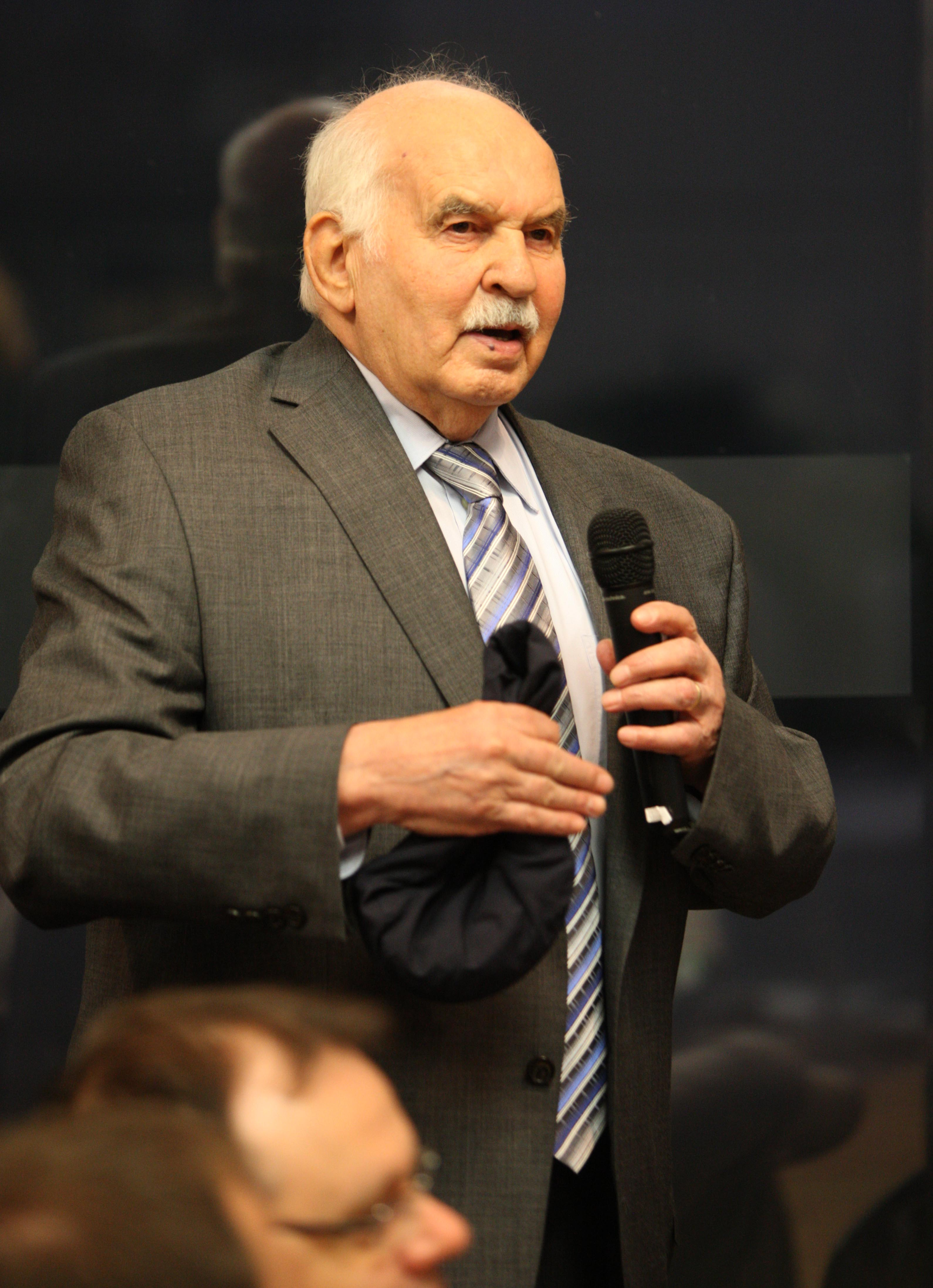

Member of the National Assembly
- In office 18 June 1998 – 5 May 2014
- In office 29 November 1945 – 29 August 1947

Personal details
- Born: 7 November 1921 Cece, Hungary
- Died: 25 November 2019 (aged 98) Budapest, Hungary
- Party: Fidesz (since 1998)
- Other political affiliations: FKGP (1942–1947; 1956); Republican Party
- Children: 1
- Profession: Economist, politician

János Horváth (7 November 1921 – 25 November 2019) was a Hungarian economist and politician, member of the National Assembly (MP) from 1945 to 1947, and later from 1998 to 2014. He fled to the United States after the failure of the Hungarian revolution of 1956 becoming a college professor and, later, a candidate for the United States House of Representatives.

Horváth was the oldest Member of Parliament between 2003 until his retirement in 2014. He was also the youngest member of the Hungarian Parliament in 1945.

== Biography ==
=== Early life ===
He finished Count István Széchenyi School of Commerce of Budapest in 1940. He worked for Nostra General Public Warehouse Company until 1947, first as an accountant, then as deputy chief accountant and finally as president of the company. He studied besides discharging his duties at his workplace and he graduated from the Faculty of Economy of the József Nádor University of Technology and Economics in 1946.

He was a scout from 1933. He joined Calvinist youth movements from 1936 to 1939. He was chairman of one of the Soli Deo Gloria Colleges from 1938 to 1939.

=== Political career ===
Horváth joined the Independent Smallholders, Agrarian Workers and Civic Party (FKGP) in 1942. He was also a member of the Alliance of Peasants since that year. He participated the national resistance in 1944 against the Arrow Cross regime as a member of the "Free Life" Students' Movement. As a result, he was arrested by the Gestapo and sentenced to death. However he successfully escaped from the prison during the chaos in Budapest.

After the end of the Second World War, he was elected as a deputy to the Municipality Committee of Budapest in 1945. He served as economic policy director of the Hungarian Alliance of Peasants from May 1945 to 1947. He was appointed leader of the Budapest District XIII branch of the Independent Smallholders' Party in February 1945. He became a member of the Provisional National Assembly from the FKGP's Greater Budapest Regional List on November 4, 1945. During his tenure he was a colleague of Prime Minister Ferenc Nagy.

He was arrested on trumped-up charges relating to the Hungarian Community (Magyar Közösség) case on 16 January 1947 and he was sentenced to four years of forced labour. He was expelled from the Independent Smallholders' Party on 4 February 1947. He was released in 1951. After that he worked as a manual worker from 1951 and a mechanic from 1954.

During the Hungarian Revolution of 1956, he participated in the reorganization of the Hungarian Alliance of Peasants. He became managing chairman of the National Economic Reconstruction Council. He also joined the re-established FKGP and became its leader in the District XIII. After the suppression of the revolution, he left the country along with his wife on 4 November 1956.

=== After 1956 ===
He went to the UN Office in New York on 9 November 1956. He was a founding member of the Hungarian Revolutionary Council in January 1957. He was awarded a Ph.D. degree from Columbia University of New York in 1966. He became President of the Kossuth Foundation in 1966. He was a professor at Butler University since 1968. He was a visiting researcher at the Institution for Communist Affairs of Columbia University between 1971 and 1972. He founded the Indianapolis Export Trading Company in 1983.

In Indiana in 1990 and 1992 he ran against Andrew Jacobs Jr. for a seat in the U.S. House of Representatives.

Horváth returned to Hungary at the invitation of Viktor Orbán, leader of Fidesz in 1997. He obtained an honorary doctorate from the University of Economics and Public Administration of Budapest where he lectured as guest professor. He has been chairman of the cultural economy branch of the Hungarian Society of Economics and a member of the Society for the Transmission of Culture since 1999. He is the author or co-author of fourteen books and several hundred articles. He occupied the position of chairman of the economic policy committee of Fidesz in 1998.

He was elected to the National Assembly of Hungary in the 1998 Hungarian parliamentary election from the party's National List after more than fifty years. He was a member of the Committee on Economics between June 25, 1998 and May 14, 2002. He served as Chairman of the Subcommittee for the European Integration during that time. Four years later, he obtained a mandate also from the Fidesz National List. He became a member of the Committee on Foreign Affairs.

After the death of László Varga in 2003, János Horváth was the oldest sitting Member of Parliament. In that capacity he opened the inaugural meeting of the National Assembly in 2006 and 2010 as the Father of the House.

Horváth died on 25 November 2019 at the age of 98.

Honorary titles
Preceded by László Varga	Oldest sitting Member of Parliament; 2003–2014	Succeeded by Béla Turi-Kovács
