= Ágnes Vadai =

Hungarian politician

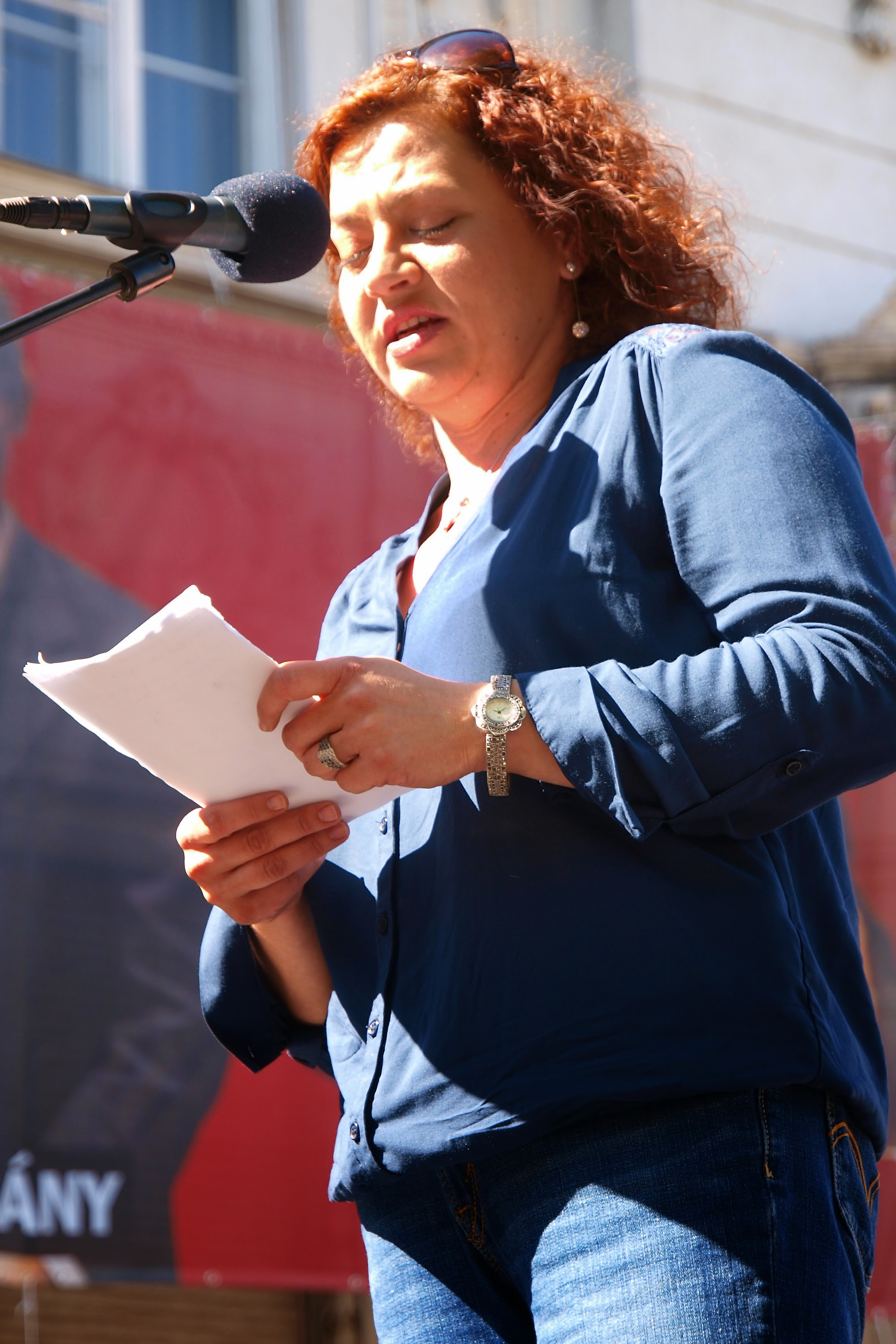
- Ágnes Vadai in 2013

Member of the National Assembly
- In office 15 May 2002 – 9 May 2026

Personal details
- Born: 11 February 1974 (age 52) Karcag, Hungary
- Party: MSZP (1999–2011); DK (2011– )
- Occupation: Politician; International relations scholar

Ágnes Vadai (born 11 February 1974) is a Hungarian politician and international relations scholar. She has been a Member of the National Assembly of Hungary since 2002. In her first several terms she was a representative for the Hungarian Socialist Party. She was a founding member of the Democratic Coalition when it was a faction within the Hungarian Socialist Party, and became its vice president after it became a separate political party. She speaks six languages, English, French, Russian, Spanish, Norwegian and German.

== Career and Life ==
Vadai was born in Karcag in 1974. She graduated from the Katalin Varga Bilingual Grammar School in Szolnok in 1992. She then attended the Budapest University of Technology and Economics, where she graduated in 1997 with a degree in International Relations and European Studies. She then worked as a research fellow in international relations, and studied abroad in Spain and the United States. In 1999 she became a graduate student at the Eötvös Loránd University, earning a doctorate in law in 2003. Beginning in 2000 she was a lecturer at the Zrínyi Miklós National Defence University (which later merged with other colleges to become the National University of Public Service), and in 2007 she was appointed professor there.

In 1999, Vadai became a founding member of the Young Left (hu), the youth wing of the Hungarian Socialist Party. In 2000 she became a member of the Karcag municipal leadership of the Hungarian Socialist Party, and in 2004 she joined its national leadership.

Vadai was first elected to parliament in 2002, and was re-elected in 2006, 2010, 2014, and 2018, always affiliated with the Hungarian Socialist party. From July 2007 to April 2009, she was Secretary of State in the Ministry of Defense. In April 2009, she was again appointed Secretary of State in the Ministry of Defense.

Vadai was a founding member of the Democratic Coalition faction of the Hungarian Socialist Party, and after it became an independent political party, she was named its vice president.
