= Felsőrajk =

Coordinates: 46°41′N 17°00′E

- Village
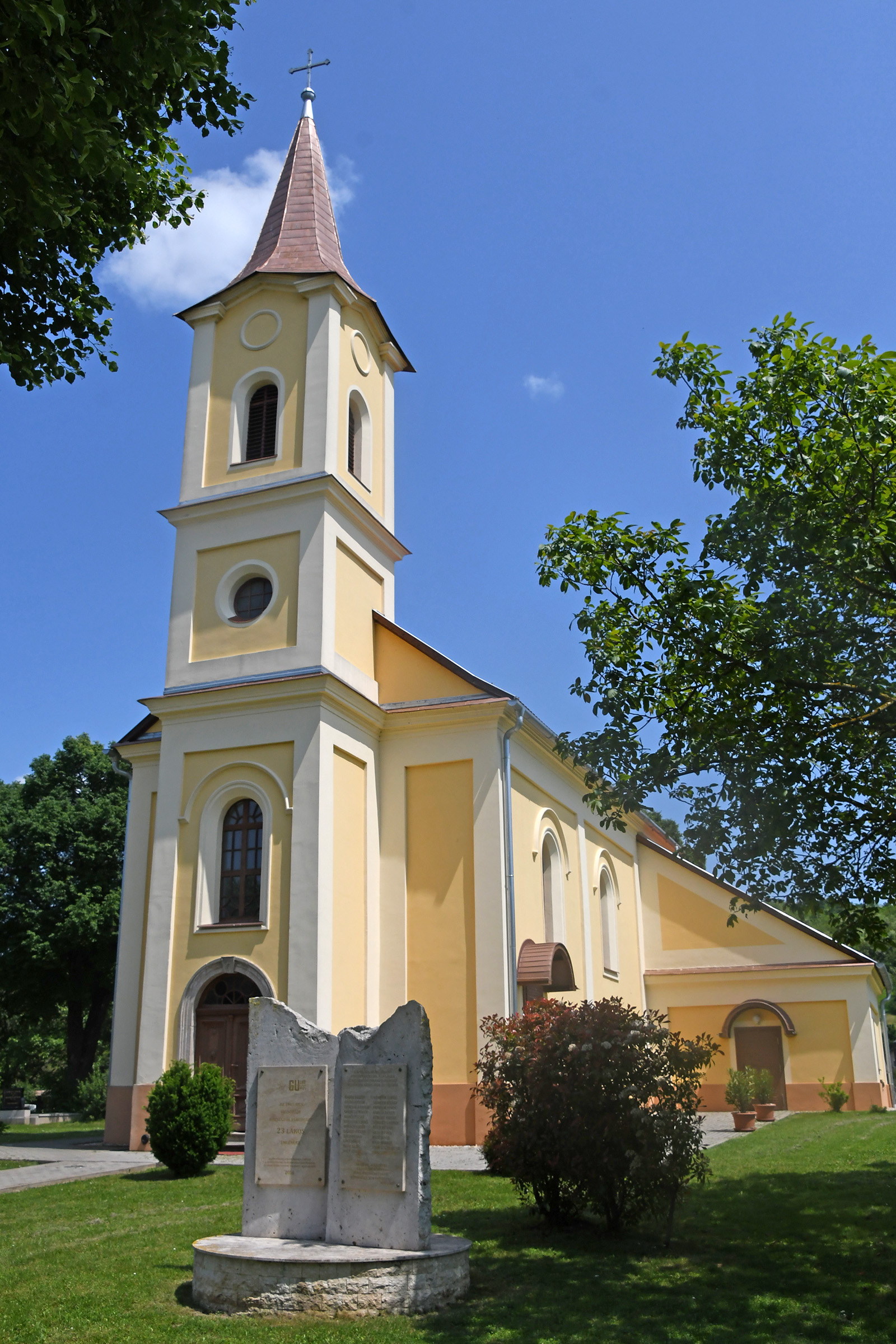
- A Roman Catholic Church in Felsorajk, Hungary
- Interactive map of Felsőrajk
- Country: Hungary
- Region: Western Transdanubia
- County: Zala County
- Time zone: UTC+1 (CET)
  - Summer (DST): UTC+2 (CEST)

Felsőrajk is a village in Zala County, Hungary.
