= György Balla =

Hungarian politician (born 1962)

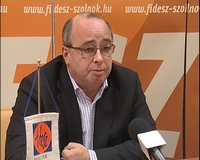

Member of the National Assembly
- Incumbent
- Assumed office 18 June 1998

Personal details
- Born: 11 August 1962 (age 63) Szolnok, Hungary
- Party: Fidesz
- Spouse: Beáta Birinyi
- Children: György; Mátyás
- Profession: politician

György Balla (born 11 August 1962) is a Hungarian politician, member of the National Assembly (MP) since 1998. He is one of the deputy leaders of the Fidesz parliamentary group since 14 May 2010.

== Biography ==
György Balla finished Ságvári Endre Teacher Training Secondary School of József Attila University of Szeged in 1981. He graduated as a geophysicist from the University of Heavy Industry of Miskolc in 1987. He worked as an assessor engineer for the Oil Research Company of Szolnok from 1987 to 1992. In the meantime he obtained a degree as an engineer economist in 1991. He was manager of AXON Asset Management, Organisation and Investment Company of Szolnok from 1995 to 1998. He has been a member of the Hungarian Geophysicists' Association and Márai Sándor Civic Circle since 1987.

He was a founding member of the Szolnok branch of Fidesz in 1989 and acted as the local spokesperson of the party until 1990. He ran for Parliament in 1990 and 1994 as an individual candidate but did not manage to secure a seat. He was a representative of the Assembly of Szolnok City with County Status as well as of the Jász-Nagykun-Szolnok County Assembly from 1990 to 2002. He held the position of party group leader in the County Assembly from 1990 to 1998. He was the executive of the Szolnok branch of Fidesz and a member of the National Board from 1991 to 1992. He headed the party's Szolnok office from 1992 to 1995. He has been deputy president of the Szolnok branch of FIDESZ since 1995, and of the party's County organization since 1996. From 2003 to 2004 he headed Constituency 4 of Szolnok City with County Status.

In the 1998 parliamentary election he was elected from the party's Jász-Nagykun-Szolnok County list. Also in 1998 he was elected mayor of Szolnok in the local elections. In the parliamentary elections of April 2002 he secured a mandate from Fidesz' national list. He has served on the Economic Committee since May of the same year. He was elected incumbent representative in the Szolnok body of representatives in the local elections in October 2002.

In the parliamentary elections of 2006 he secured a mandate from Zala County Regional List. Four years later he became MP from Jász-Nagykun-Szolnok County Regional List. He was a member of the Committee on Budget, Finance and Audit Office. He secured a mandate from the joint national list of Fidesz-KDNP in 2014 and 2018. He is a member of the Legislative Committee since May 2014. He was briefly appointed vice-chairman of the committee in May 2018, holding the position until October 2018.

== Personal life ==
He is married. His wife, Beáta Birinyi is a primary-school teacher. They have two sons, György and Mátyás.
