= Zsolt Tiffán =

Hungarian winemaker and politician (1965–2025)

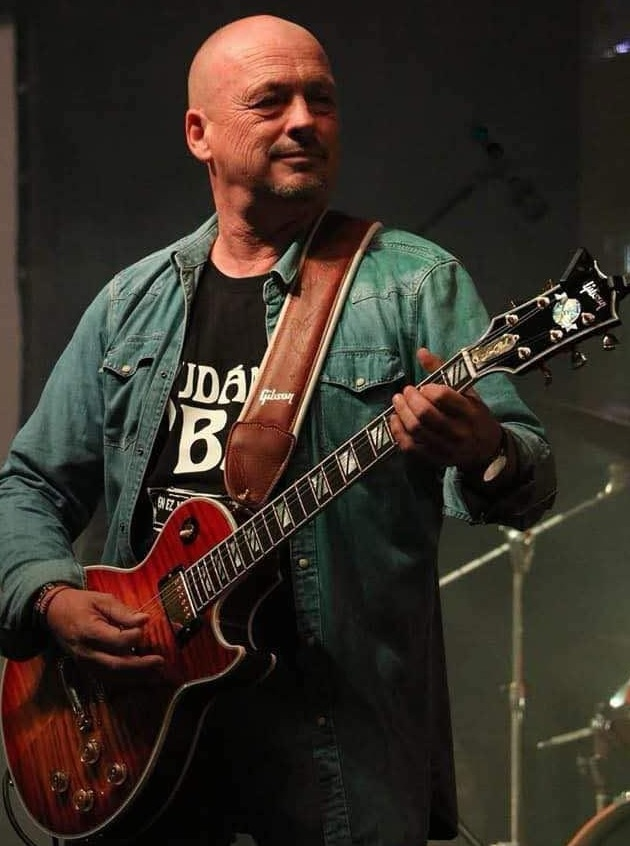
- Zsolt Tiffán in 2022

Member of the National Assembly
- In office 14 May 2010 – 7 May 2018

Personal details
- Born: 23 August 1965 Mohács, Hungary
- Died: 12 April 2025 (aged 59) Mohács, Hungary
- Party: Fidesz (1998–2025)
- Children: Zsolt; Balázs; Csenge
- Profession: winemaker, politician

Zsolt Tiffán (23 August 1965 – 12 April 2025) was a Hungarian winemaker and politician, member of the National Assembly (MP) for Siklós (Baranya County Constituency VI) from 2010 to 2014, and for Orosháza (Baranya County Constituency IV) from 2014 to 2018.

== Life and career ==
Tiffán was born on 23 August 1965. He served as President of the General Assembly of Baranya County from 2012 to 2014. He functioned as ministerial commissioner responsible for the Ős-Dráva Program ("Ancient Drava Programme") regional development concept between 14 June 2014 and 15 June 2016.

He became a member of the Committee on Agriculture on 14 May 2010 and Chairman of the Subcommittee for Viticulture and Oenology on 26 May 2010. He was a member of the Economic Committee and Chairman of the Subcommittee on Wine and Gastronomy from 2014 to 2018.

Tiffán died on 12 April 2025, at the age of 59.
