= Márk Bíró =

Hungarian politician

Member of the National Assembly
- In office 14 May 2010 – 1 May 2022

Personal details
- Born: 1974 (age 51–52) Eger, Hungary
- Party: Fidesz (since 2002)
- Spouse: Ivetta Bíróné Wiltner
- Children: Nikoletta
- Profession: politician

Márk Bíró (born 1974) is a Hungarian politician of the party Fidesz.He was a member of the National Assembly (MP) from the party's Nógrád County Regional List between 2010 and 2014, and the Fidesz–KDNP national list from 2014 to 2022.

== Career ==
Bíró graduated as a technical salesman in Salgótarján. He joined Fidesz after the party lost the 2002 Hungarian parliamentary election. He was elected a member of the Nógrád County Assembly during the 2006 local elections. He functioned as party director of the local Fidesz branch in Northern Hungary. In the Hungarian parliament, Bíró was involved in the Defence and Internal Security Committee from 21 June 2010 to 1 May 2021, and in the Committee on Consumer Protection for a brief time in May–June 2010.

According to former Democratic Coalition (DK) politician Bálint Szabó, Bíró played a role in the leaking of Ferenc Gyurcsány's speech in Balatonőszöd in May 2006. On 27 June 2013, Szabó said Eduardo Rózsa-Flores gave the recording to Bíró. The speech was made public several months later, which led to the 2006 protests in Hungary.

Márk Bíró decided to retire from politics and not to run in the 2022 parliamentary election. Throughout his 12 years of parliamentary activity, Bíró never once spoke at a plenary session of the parliament.

== Personal life ==
He is married. His wife is Ivetta Bíróné Wiltner. They have a daughter, Nikoletta.
