= Mátyás Firtl =

Hungarian engineer and politician (born 1949)

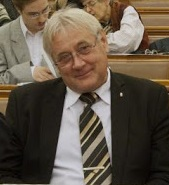

Member of the National Assembly
- In office 23 May 2005 – 7 May 2018

Personal details
- Born: 30 October 1949 (age 77) Sopron, Hungary
- Party: KDNP (1989–1997; since 2006); MKDSZ (1997–2006); Fidesz (since 1997)
- Children: Katalin Barbara; Mátyás Sándor
- Profession: engineer

Mátyás Firtl (born 30 October 1949) is a Hungarian engineer and politician, who was elected member of the National Assembly (MP) for Sopron (Győr-Moson-Sopron County Constituency VII then IV) during a by-election in 2005, holding the seat until 2018.

== Early life ==
He completed his primary studies at Sopron and Kópháza. He finished as a mechanician technician in the Kempelen Farkas Technical School of Sopron in 1968. His first workplace was the station of the Hungarian Post Radio and Television Technology Management in Sopron. Beside his work he obtained qualification from the postal power supplying systems as well as he took part in the professional training of the Post-Technology Officer's School. He did his national military service from 1969 to 1971. From 1968 he spent about thirty years at the Television Station as technologist, later as service group leader.

He is member of several civil organizations: Napraforgó Foundation, Croatian Society of Kópháza, a Croatian minority local government, Corvinus Circle, International Police Association. He received several awards for his regional and social activities. In 2003 he received "Silver Chain" of the Hungarian Association for Persons with Intellectual Disability, and "Frim Jakab Gold Medal" from the Hungarian Association for Persons with Intellectual Disability in 2004.

== Political career ==
He has participated in politics as founding member of the Christian Democratic People's Party (KDNP) of Kópháza and Sopron branch. From 1990 to 1994 he was county vice-chairman, member of the party's National Executive Committee. In 1997 he expelled from KDNP. He was one of the founding members of Hungarian Christian Democratic Alliance (MKDSZ) in August 1997. In November he joined Fidesz party. In 2001 he established a Fidesz group in Kópháza of which he was elected president.

In the spring of 1990 local elections he was a candidate, he was elected a member of the Kópháza local government in the autumn. In the 1994 parliamentary election he was on the national list of the KDNP, he became a member of the County Assembly in December. In the 1998 local elections he ran as a candidate on the party's county regional list and he was elected a member of the Somogy County Assembly again. He was elected vice-president on 25 February 1999. In April 2002 local elections he was candidate on the FIDESZ-MDF joint list. From October he was also elected general vice-president. He was a representative in Kópháza. From 1999 he has been head of the Alpok-Adria Collective.

In November 2004, during parliamentary by-election he ran as a candidate of FIDESZ-KDNP for the place of József Szájer, who was elected member of the European Parliament. This election proved to be an invalid and inconclusive because of low participation of voters. In April 2005 the second parliamentary re-election was an invalid in the first round. In the second round he won with 71,8% of the votes on 8 May 2005. He took on his oath of MP on 23 May 2005. In 2006, at the parliamentary election he obtained a mandate for Sopron again. He was appointed a Vice Chairman of the Committee of the European Issues on 30 May 2006. He was elected deputy mayor of Kópháza during the 2010 local elections.

Firtl retired from public life after 2018 parliamentary election, when his successor, Attila Barcza was elected MP and joined Fidesz caucus.

== Personal life ==
He has a daughter, Katalin Barbara and a son, Mátyás Sándor.
