= Erik Bánki =

Hungarian politician

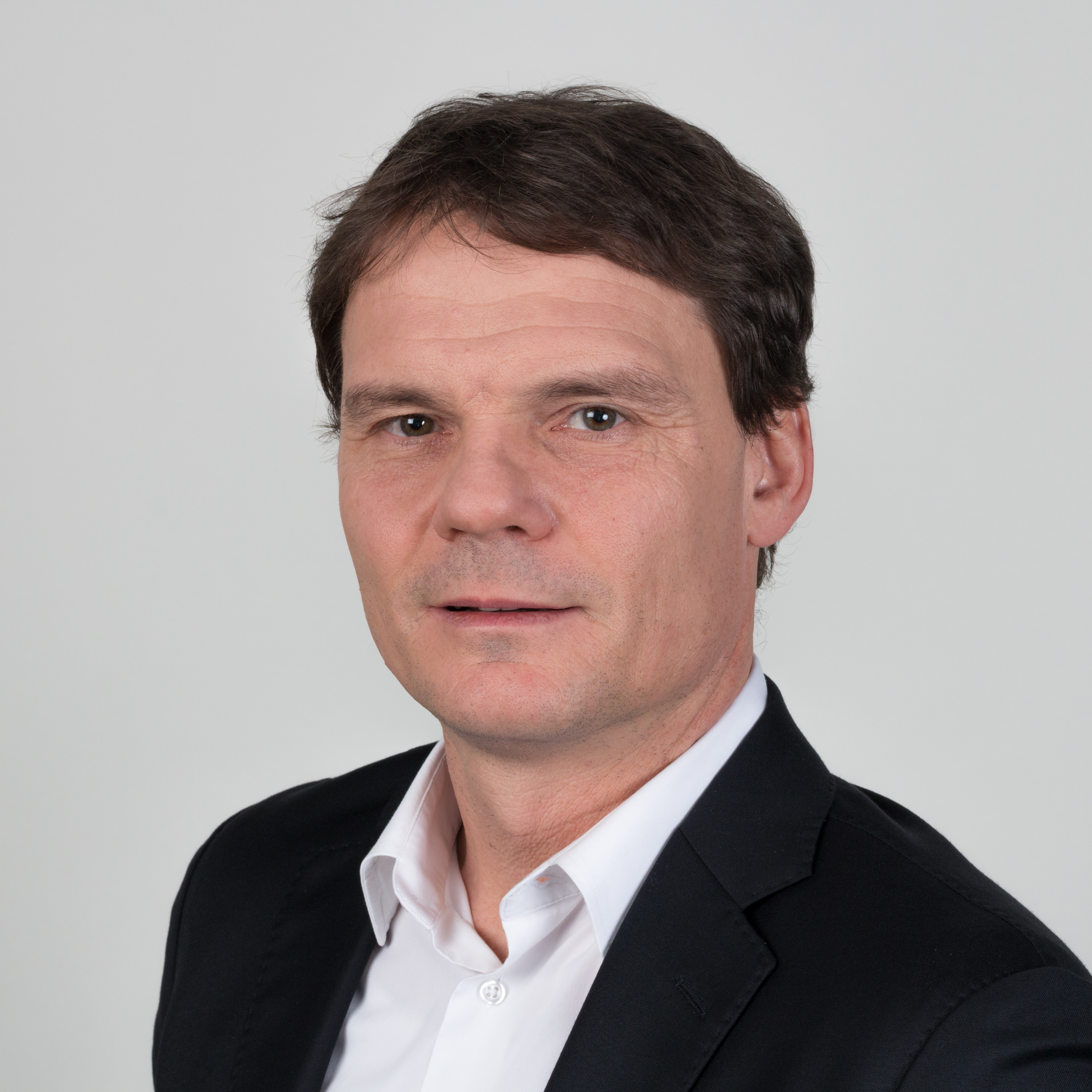

Member of the National Assembly
- In office 6 May 2014 – 8 May 2026
- In office 18 June 1998 – 10 June 2012

Personal details
- Born: 26 May 1970 (age 56) Szekszárd, Hungary
- Party: Fidesz
- Profession: Politician

Erik Bánki (born May 26, 1970) is a Hungarian politician, member of the National Assembly (MP) from 1998 to 2012 and from 2014 to 2026.

He served as Chairman of the Parliamentary Committee on Sport and Tourism from May 14, 2010, to June 10, 2012. He is a Member of Board of the Hungarian Football Federation from 2009.

Bánki became Member of the European Parliament (MEP) on June 10, 2012, replacing János Áder, who was elected President of Hungary in May 2012. As a result, Bánki had to resign from his national parliamentary seat. He was re-elected Hungarian MP in the 2014 parliamentary election. He became Chairman of the Parliamentary Committee on Economics in October 2015, serving in this capacity until May 2026. Bánki was re-elected MP via the joint national list of Fidesz-KDNP during the 2018 and 2022 Hungarian parliamentary elections. After the 2026 Hungarian parliamentary election, where Fidesz–KDNP suffered a heavy defeat and fell from power, Bánki did not take up his mandate.

== Personal life ==
Bánki is divorced and is the father of four children.
