= Sebestyén Vágó =

Hungarian politician

Member of the National Assembly
- In office 14 May 2010 – 7 May 2018

Personal details
- Born: 1 September 1976 (age 49) Budapest, Hungary
- Party: Jobbik (2007–2022); 2RK (since 2024)
- Profession: livestock breeder, politician

Sebestyén Vágó (born 1 September 1976) is a Hungarian animal breeder, animal health technician, social educator and politician, who was a member of the National Assembly (MP) from 2010 to 2018, as a member of the Jobbik.

== Studies ==
He completed his primary school education in Tarján and Tata. He graduated in 1995 and then in 1996 he obtained a technician's degree in animal husbandry and animal health at the Jávorka Sándor Agricultural Secondary School in Tata. In 2003 he graduated from the correspondence course of social pedagogy at the Benedek Elek Pedagogical College of the University of West Hungary.

== Political career ==
Vágó joined Jobbik in 2007. He was elected MP via the party's Komárom-Esztergom County regional list in the 2010 Hungarian parliamentary election. He was a member of the Committee on Youth, Social Affairs, Family and Housing from 2010 to 2014. He was re-elected MP via the party's national list in the 2018 Hungarian parliamentary election. He was a member then vice-chairman of the Welfare Committee from 2014 to 2018. Vágó left Jobbik around the time of the 2022 Hungarian parliamentary election. By 2024, he joined Second Reform Era Party (2RK), founded by former Jobbik party leader Gábor Vona.
