= János Fónagy =

Hungarian jurist, economist and politician

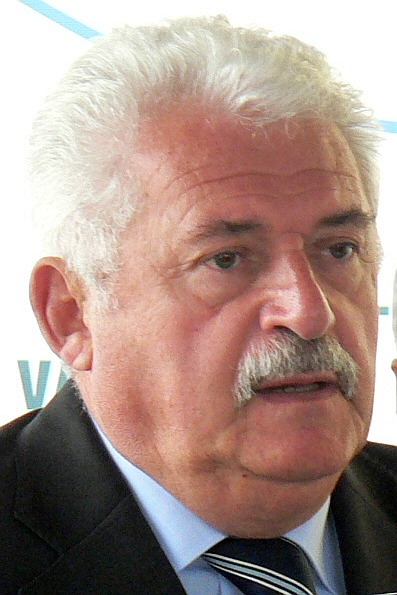

Minister of Transport and Water Management
- In office 1 December 2000 – 27 May 2002
- Prime Minister: Viktor Orbán
- Preceded by: László Nógrádi
- Succeeded by: István Csillag (Economy and Transport); Mária Kóródi (Environment)

Personal details
- Born: 11 July 1942 (age 83) Budapest, Hungary
- Party: Fidesz (since 1993)
- Other political affiliations: MSZMP (until 1985)
- Spouse: Ágnes Tábori
- Children: 1
- Profession: Jurist

Dr. János Vilmos Fónagy (born 11 July 1942) is a Hungarian jurist, economist and politician, who served as Minister of Transport and Water Management between 2000 and 2002. He was Parliamentary State Secretary for National Development between 2 June 2010 and 17 May 2018.

== Biography ==
=== Personal life and early career ===
Fónagy was born into a Jewish family in 1942. His father was a textile engineer, while his mother worked as a physiotherapist. He married Ágnes Tábori in 1965, they have a daughter and two grandchildren. His wife is a senior corporate attorney.

He finished in the Transportation Department of a Technical School of Economics in 1960. After acquiring a certificate in boatbuilding in 1962, he started to work in the Budapesti Építők SC. He took up a post in the Ózd Foundry from 1964 to 1965. While working, he graduated from the Faculty of Law of the Eötvös Loránd University in 1966. He was employed in a law office in Ózd in 1966. In the same year, he went to work at the Department of Agriculture of the local council in Ózd. He took a specialist examination in corporate advocacy in 1968. He started to work as the attorney of the Putnok cooperative in 1968. He was appointed senior attorney in 1981, financial manager in 1984, and marketing manager of the Ózd Foundry. He was the executive director of the structure development company Szerkezetfejlesztő Kft. active in the Ózd Region from 1989 to 1998.

=== Political career ===
Before the end of Communism in Hungary, he was a member of the Hungarian Socialist Workers' Party (MSZMP), from where he quit in 1985. He had no political positions during that time. He returned to the public life, when joined Fidesz in 1993. He has been member of the Ózd organisation ever since. He was vice president of the Borsod-Abaúj-Zemplén County organisation from 1994 to 1998. Currently, he is a member of the National Board. After the transformation into a people's party in 2003-2004 he was awarded the constituency chairmanship of the Budapest 13th District (Angyalföld) organisation.

Fónagy was elected Member of Parliament in May 1998. He was appointed Parliamentary Secretary for Economy on 14 July 1998. As Parliamentary Secretary for the Prime Minister's Office appointed on 1 February 2000, he was head of the Economic, Financial and Agricultural Unit. He was Minister of Transport and Water Management from 1 December 2000 to 27 May 2002. He was active in the National Regional Development Council.

He was re-elected from the Fidesz Borsod-Abaúj-Zemplén County Regional List in April 2002. He had been deputy chairman of the Economic Committee during the 2002–2006 term. He was re-elected to the County Assembly in the local elections held in autumn. In the general elections held in 2006, he was elected from Budapest Regional List. He was a member of the Economic and Information Technology Committee from 2006 to 2010.

János Fónagy was appointed Parliamentary State Secretary for National Development after the elections in 2010, under minister Tamás Fellegi. On 1 May 2012 he was appointed Government Commissioner responsible for the conversion of public transport for one-year term. Fónagy was re-elected MP for Hegyvidék, 12th district of Budapest (Budapest Constituency III) in the 2014 parliamentary election. He was elected MP via his party's national list in the 2018 parliamentary election. Subsequently, he became a state secretary of the Hungarian Government Office on 22 May 2018.

==== Feud with Előd Novák ====
During the amendments to the bill on churches in 2011, János Fónagy proposed acknowledging the Sim Shalom Progressive Jewish Congregation as an established church. In the final parliamentary debate, on 11 July 2011, Jobbik MP Előd Novák caused a stir by exclaiming "what else could be expected" from Fónagy than that proposal. János Lázár, leader of the Fidesz parliamentary group, asked Novák to apologize, which he declined to do.

Fónagy responded he did not expect Novák to apologize, as the Jobbik politician only said the same thing his "spiritual role models" had said. The state secretary added the reason there were few people in the Dohány Street Synagogue was that there were 600,000 people missing from the country, as Novák's "spiritual role models created this situation there." Fónagy asked the Jobbik MP not to blame the Jewish community for being small. Gábor Vona, chairman and faction leader of Jobbik, said Novák's comments were "excusable" in the heat of the debate, as was Fónagy's comment when he called the 850,000 voters of Jobbik "descendants of murderers."

== Personal life ==
He is married. His wife is Dr Ágnes Fónagyné Tábori. They have a child.

He is of Jewish descent, but he states that he is Agnostic.

== Sources ==
- MTI Ki Kicsoda 2009, Magyar Távirati Iroda Zrt., Budapest 2008, p. 333. ISSN 1787-288X
