= Enikő Hegedűs =

Hungarian politician

Member of the National Assembly
- In office 14 May 2010 – 21 March 2019

Personal details
- Born: 1970 (age 55–56) Budapest, Hungary
- Party: Jobbik (2010–2019)
- Relations: Loránt Hegedűs Sr. (father-in law); Zsolt Hegedűs (brother-in law)
- Profession: architect, politician

Enikő Hegedűs (née Kovács; born 1970) is a Hungarian politician and architect, who was a member of the National Assembly (MP) between 2010 and 2019. She was a member of the far-right Jobbik.

== Biography ==
She was born in 1970 in Budapest. She graduated from the Móricz Zsigmond Gymnasium. She married Calvinist pastor and MIÉP politician Lóránt Hegedűs in October 1994. She graduated from the Faculty of Architecture of the Budapest University of Technology (BME) in 1994. She graduated from the Budapest College of Communication (present-day Budapest Metropolitan University) as a tender writer and project manager. In 2009, she completed the training of municipal chief architect and specialist engineer at the Faculty of Architecture of the Budapest University of Technology and Economics.

Hegedűs was a member of the local representative body of Budakeszi from 2002 to 2006. She served as deputy mayor of Budakeszi between 2006 and 2010. She was elected Member of Parliament via the Jobbik's national list in 2010 Hungarian parliamentary election. She was re-elected MP in 2014 and 2018. She served as one of the recorders of the National Assembly between 2010 and 2018. She was a member of the Municipal and Regional Development Committee from 2010 to 2014 and the Budget Committee from 2014 to 2018. She functioned as vice-chairperson of the Legislative Committee between 2018 and 2019.

On February 26, 2019, she announced her quit from the Jobbik parliamentary group, resigned from all positions she held in Jobbik, and left the party. She disagreed with the party's new direction, which was moving towards moderation. She resigned as MP some weeks later, on 21 March 2019.
