= Sándor Czomba =

Hungarian engineer and politician

Member of the National Assembly
- In office 16 May 2006 – 7 May 2018

Personal details
- Born: 14 August 1963 (age 62) Vásárosnamény, Hungary
- Party: Fidesz (since 1998)
- Spouse(s): Tünde Nagy (1st); Dóra Baranyai(2nd)
- Children: Gábor; Gergely; Kitti
- Profession: politician, engineer

Sándor Czomba (born 14 August 1963) is a Hungarian engineer and politician, member of the National Assembly (MP) for Vásárosnamény (Szabolcs-Szatmár-Bereg County Constituency VIII) between 2006 and 2014, and the Fidesz's national list from 2014 to 2018. He was a member of the Committee on Employment and Work from 30 May 2006 to 13 May 2010.

After the legislative election in 2010, he was appointed Secretary of State for Employment in the Ministry of National Economy on 2 June 2010. He was replaced by Péter Cseresnyés on 8 October 2015. Following that, he served as a vice-chairman of the Economic Committee until the end of the parliamentary term in May 2018.

== Personal life ==
He is married with his second wife, Dóra Baranyai. His first wife was Tünde Nagy. He has three children.
