= Gábor Törő =

Hungarian politician

Member of the National Assembly
- Incumbent
- Assumed office 14 May 2010

Personal details
- Born: 7 March 1962 (age 64) Mór, Hungary
- Party: Fidesz
- Children: 2
- Profession: mechanical technician, politician

Gábor Törő (born 7 March 1962) is a Hungarian mechanical technician and politician, member of the National Assembly (MP) for Mór (Fejér County Constituency V) from 2010 to 2014, and for Székesfehérvár (Fejér County Constituency II) since 2014.

He was President of the General Assembly of Fejér County between 2006 and 2014. He was a member of the Committee on Sport and Tourism from 14 May 2010 to 11 February 2013. Besides that he also served as head of the subcommittee investigating abuses of the previous Socialist governments in the field of sporting affairs. He was a member of the Committee on Foreign Affairs from 11 February 2013 to 5 May 2014. He was a member of the Committee on Culture from 2014 to 2018 and Enterprise Development Committee from 2015 to 2018 and Economic Committee from May to October 2018. Currently, he is a member of the Legislative Committee since October 2018.
