= Zoltán Gőgös =

Hungarian agricultural engineer and politician

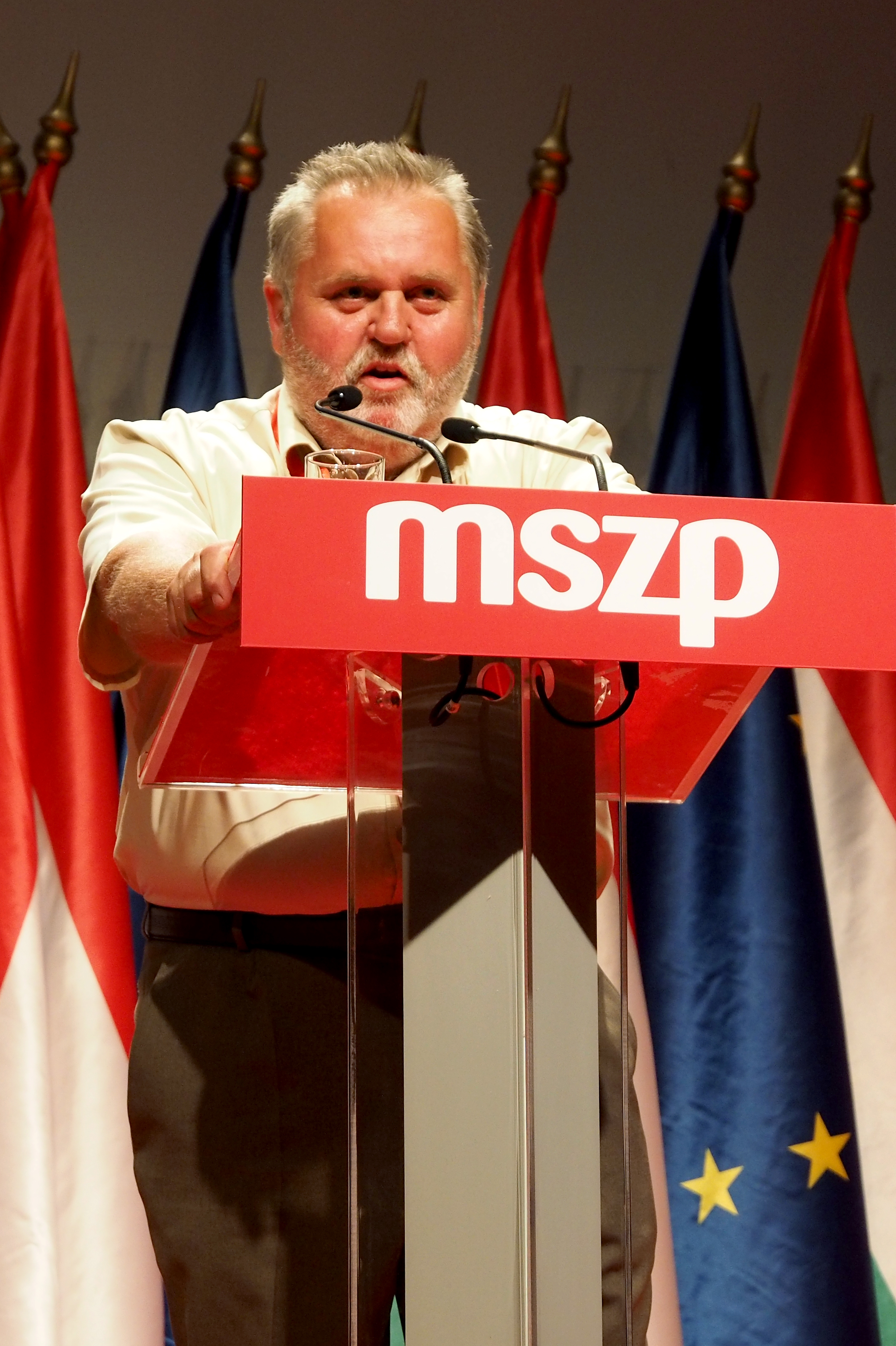
- Zoltán Gőgös in 2014

Member of the National Assembly
- In office 27 October 2014 – 7 May 2018
- In office 15 May 2002 – 5 May 2014

Personal details
- Born: 9 May 1960 (age 65) Pápa, Hungary
- Party: MSZP (1989– )
- Profession: agricultural engineer, politician

Zoltán Gőgös (born 9 May 1960) is a Hungarian agricultural engineer and Hungarian Socialist Party (MSZP) politician, member of the National Assembly (MP) between 2002 and 2018 (except for a short period of time in 2014). He served as Secretary of State for Agriculture and Rural Development from 2006 to 2010.

== Studies and profession ==
Gőgös was born in Pápa on 9 May 1960. He finished his secondary studies at the local Türr István Gymnasium in 1978. He earned a degree of agricultural mechanical engineer at the Agricultural College of Nyíregyháza in 1981. He worked as a branch head for the State Farm of Pápa and its legal successor, the Agroprodukt Ltd. from 1981 until 2000. He earned a second degree of economist engineer at the Zalaegerszeg Institute of the Financial and Accounting College in 1997. He functioned as the production director of the Készenlét Mezőgazdasági Szolgáltató Ltd. since 2001.

== Political career ==
Gőgös is a founding member of the Hungarian Socialist Party (MSZP) since October 1989. He was elected into the leadership of the local party branch in Pápa then. He served as vice-chairman then deputy chairman of the party's Veszprém County branch from 1996. He was a candidate for the 1990 parliamentary election, but did not secure a mandate. He was elected into the Pápa local representative body during the 1994 municipal election. He became a member of the General Assembly of Veszprém County after the 1998 municipal election.

He was elected a Member of Parliament via his party's Veszprém County regional list in the 2002 parliamentary election. During his first parliamentary term, he was involved in the Budget and Finance Committee and the Agriculture Committee (serving its vice-chairman after 2004). He was re-elected MP during the 2006 parliamentary election, and was a member of the National Security Committee for a short time. He was appointed Secretary of State for Agriculture and Rural Development in the second cabinet of Ferenc Gyurcsány on 1 July 2006, serving under minister József Gráf. He held the office until the 2010 parliamentary election, when the Socialist Party was severely defeated by Fidesz. Gőgös gained a seat from his party's national list and became again a vice-chairman of the Agriculture Committee.

He lost his mandate in the 2014 parliamentary election. A confidant of newly elected party leader József Tóbiás, he was elected deputy chairman of the Hungarian Socialist Party on 19 July 2014. He regained his mandate via the party national list on 27 October 2014, when replaced László Botka, who resigned as MP. Gőgös became a member of the Legislative Committee in June 2015. He secured a mandate from the MSZP national list in the 2018 parliamentary election, when Fidesz won its third consecutive supermajority. The entire Socialist leadership resigned, including Gőgös, who also announced his retirement from politics, abandoning the obtained mandate.
