= 2016 Hungarian migrant quota referendum =

- 2 October 2016
- Do you want the European Union to be able to mandate the obligatory resettlement of non-Hungarian citizens into Hungary even without the approval of the National Assembly?
- Outcome: Proposal failed as voter turnout was below 50%

Results
Choice	Votes	%
Yes	56,163	1.64%
No	3,362,224	98.36%
Valid votes	3,418,387	93.83%
Invalid or blank votes	224,668	6.17%
Total votes	3,643,055	100.00%
Registered voters/turnout	8,272,625	44.04%
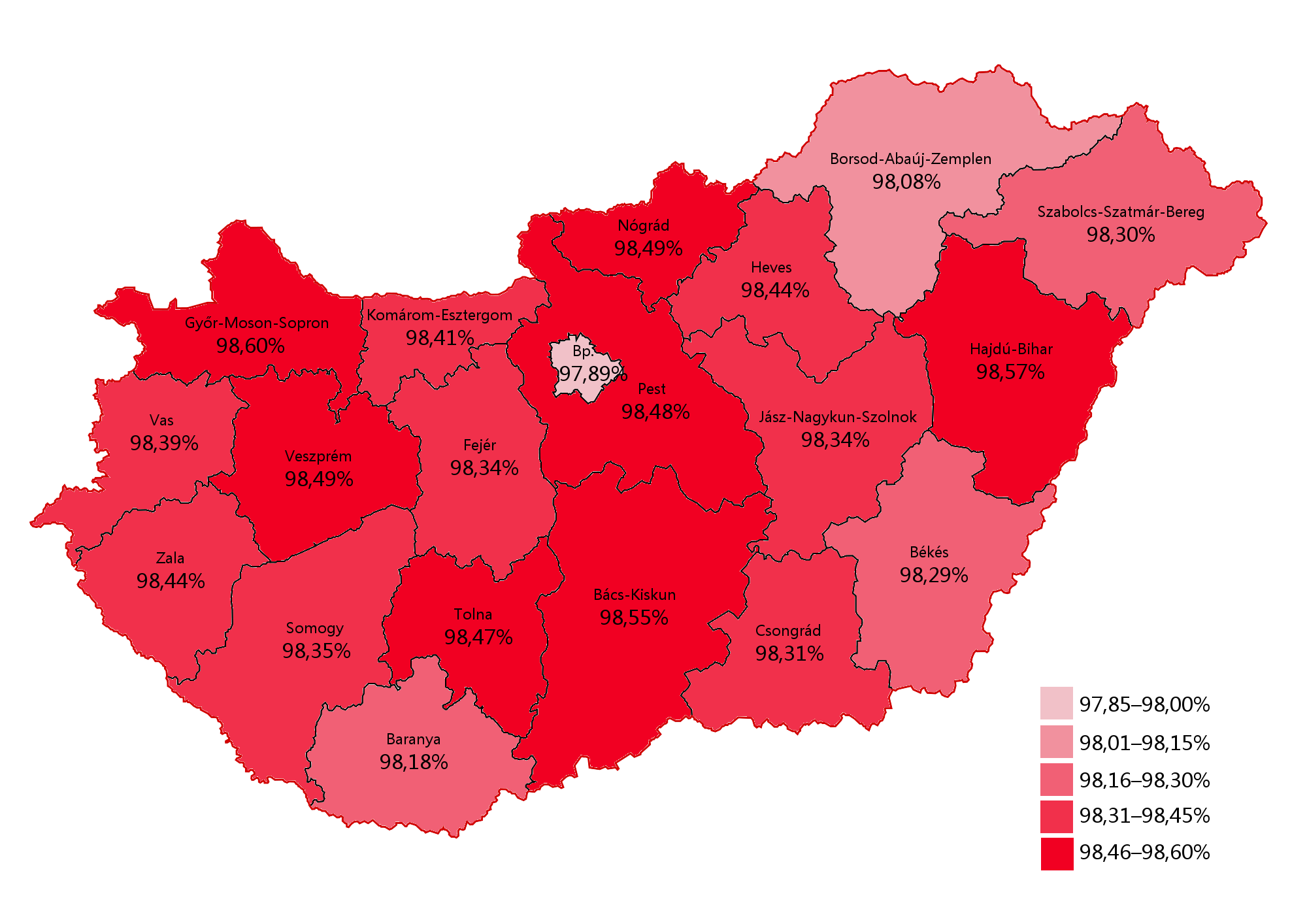
- NO votes by county

A referendum related to the European Union's migrant relocation plans was held in Hungary on 2 October 2016. The referendum was initiated by the government, under the provision of article 8 of the new constitution of 2012. It was commonly referred to as the kvótanépszavazás or kvótareferendum ("quota referendum") in the Hungarian media.

While an overwhelming majority of voters rejected the EU's migrant quotas, the share of valid votes was below the 50% required for the result to be considered valid.

== Background ==
Hungary was one of the affected countries during the European migrant crisis. On 17 June 2015, Viktor Orbán's (third) Fidesz government announced the construction of a 175-kilometre-long fence along its southern border with Serbia.

On 22 September 2015, the European Union's interior ministers, meeting in the Justice and Home Affairs Council, approved a plan to relocate 120,000 asylum seekers over two years from the "frontline" states Italy, Greece and Hungary to all other EU countries, while Hungary would have to accept 1,294 refugees from other member states. However, Hungary voted against the relocation plan, so its 54,000 asylum seekers were not taken into consideration, with that number relocated to Italy and Greece instead. Following the decision, Hungary and Slovakia took legal action over EU's mandatory migrant quotas at the European Court of Justice in Luxembourg.

On 24 February 2016, Prime Minister Viktor Orbán announced that the Hungarian government would hold a referendum on whether to accept the European Union's proposed mandatory quotas for relocating migrants. He also said it is "no secret that the Hungarian government [rejects] migrant quotas" and that it would be campaigning for "no" votes. Orbán argued the quota system would "redraw Hungary's and Europe's ethnic, cultural and religious identity, which no EU organ has the right to do". On 5 May, after examining legal challenges, the Supreme Court (Kúria) allowed the referendum to proceed. The National Assembly officially approved the referendum initiated by the government on 10 May. The initiative was approved with 136 votes cast in favour by the pro-government Fidesz and KDNP lawmakers, as well as the opposition Jobbik MPs, while the majority of left-wing opposition boycotted the plenary session. On 21 June, the Constitutional Court rejected all four appeals against plans to hold the referendum. Finally, President János Áder set 2 October 2016 as the date for the referendum.

=== Reactions ===
Immediately following the announcement, opposition parties reacted in different ways. The Hungarian Socialist Party (MSZP) agreed that approval of the National Assembly was indispensable to the resettlement of migrants to Hungary, but also demanded referendums on the issues of Sunday shopping (the third Orbán Government banned shops from opening on Sundays from 15 March 2015) and the new land law. The Democratic Coalition (DK) stated that, beside the migrant quota system, the government should hold referendums on three additional topics (Sunday shopping, financing of health care and dissolution of the centralized education system), without which they would call for a boycott. Together announced a demonstration against the referendum and called on the government not to "manipulate public opinion with phony, diversionary campaigns". Dialogue for Hungary (PM) called the government's referendum plan "legal nonsense" and a "desperate attempt to distract". The Hungarian Liberal Party (MLP) described the referendum as an "incorrect step" since, it argued, the European Union has no such legal term as "mandatory resettlement". Politics Can Be Different (LMP) did not take a position on the issue, but also considered the announcement a distraction from "important questions, such as land robbery, or prohibited Sunday shopping". Jobbik welcomed the government's step in a statement.

Speaking on behalf of the European Commission on 25 February, Natasha Bertaud said the executive body failed to understand "how [the referendum] would fit into the decision-making process which was agreed to by all member states, including Hungary, under EU treaties". Later that day, Dimitris Avramopoulos, the EU Commissioner for Migration, Home Affairs and Citizenship in the Juncker Commission, said the referendum "belongs to Hungary's internal affairs", but added "the isolated initiatives do not lead anywhere. At the moment, the unity of the [European] Union and human lives are at stake. [...]". The Dutch EU presidency responded, "Every country has the right to hold referendums". Pasi Rajala, an advisor to Finnish Finance Minister Alexander Stubb sarcastically suggested "Should we have a referendum too? »Do you agree that Finland & others pay Hungary €22bn in structural funds & €3.45bn for rural development?«". Spanish Finance Minister Cristóbal Montoro said that the widespread use of referendums on issues like these may lead to the "death" of the European Union. The following day, Martin Schulz, President of the European Parliament described the Hungarian government's call to referendum as "an ideological decision", one "not warranted by a lack of resources or capacity [for migrants]", because Hungary had to accept only 1,294 asylum seekers according to the decision on relocations. In March 2016, Schulz called the referendum plan "absurd" and a "despicable idea".

In May 2016, four major NGOs (the Hungarian Helsinki Committee, the Hungarian Civil Liberties Union, the Eötvös Károly Institute, and Political Capital) argued that the Constitution of Hungary did not allow such a referendum, and that the Supreme Court erred in allowing it. Whereas, according to Article 8 (2): "National referendums may be held about any matter falling within the functions and powers of the National Assembly", Article 8 (3) states: "No national referendum may be held on [...] any obligation arising from international treaties". According to critics, the legal validity of the question as formulated was doubtful, given the primacy of EU law over national law. Under that doctrine, laid down by the European Court of Justice as in the 1964 Costa v ENEL case, a validly adopted EU act pre-empts any conflicting act under national law from being applied. Hence, a national referendum (or law) could not override the decision of the EU Council of Ministers to relocate asylum seekers within the EU.

Several domestic and foreign political scientists and journalists argued that the Orbán government planned for the referendum to be the first step towards a Hungarian withdrawal from the European Union ("Huxit"). Reuters wrote in July 2016 that "Hungary's migrant referendum shows Europe's post-Brexit challenge". After ambiguous statements by government member János Lázár and spokesperson Zoltán Kovács, Democratic Coalition-member Csaba Molnár accused that the "Orbán Cabinet, through the referendum, will request authorization [from the people] to leave the European Union". In contrast, Index.hu argued that Lázár and Kovács's statements were [part] of a deliberate campaign strategy, since the government intended to mobilize the party voters by raising the stakes of the referendum. Fidesz MEP András Gyürk denied such plans in his blog entry, saying that "[...] By holding the referendum, Hungary wants to save the EU from going down a path that will further destabilize the EU and member state governments" and quoted Orbán's statement that "we believe in a strong European Union".

In August 2016, the Brussels-based European edition of Politico described the event as "Viktor Orbán's Potemkin referendum". The journal argued "Hungary actually needs migrants, even if it doesn't want them", citing that Hungarian businesses were suffering from skilled labor shortages. According to The Economist, the referendum was a "challenge to the authority of Brussels and the leadership of Germany's Angela Merkel, who champions the relocation scheme". Nick Thorpe, Budapest correspondent of BBC News argued that the main purpose of the referendum was that Orbán "wants to play a bigger role on the European stage, as a 'champion of the concerns of ordinary Europeans' against the actions of 'an unelected, liberal elite', as interpreted by the premier himself". Thorpe added that the only consequences of the referendum would be "political", suggesting that through the Visegrád Four, an alternative power bloc could arise based on the "Europe of Nations" concept, in opposition to the mainstream federal vision for Europe primarily supported by France and Germany. Gerald Knaus, chairman of the European Stability Initiative said Orbán was using the referendum as a tool to launch a "cultural counter-revolution" within the EU which would lead to the "end of liberal Europe".

== Referendum question ==
The referendum was:

Akarja-e, hogy az Európai Unió az Országgyűlés hozzájárulása nélkül is előírhassa nem magyar állampolgárok Magyarországra történő kötelező betelepítését?

In English:

Do you want to allow the European Union to mandate the resettlement of non-Hungarian citizens to Hungary without the approval of the National Assembly?

A more literal translation into English, mirroring the Hungarian wording and inflections more closely:

Do you want the European Union to be able to mandate the obligatory resettlement of non-Hungarian citizens into Hungary even without the approval of the National Assembly?

== Campaign ==
=== Position of political parties ===
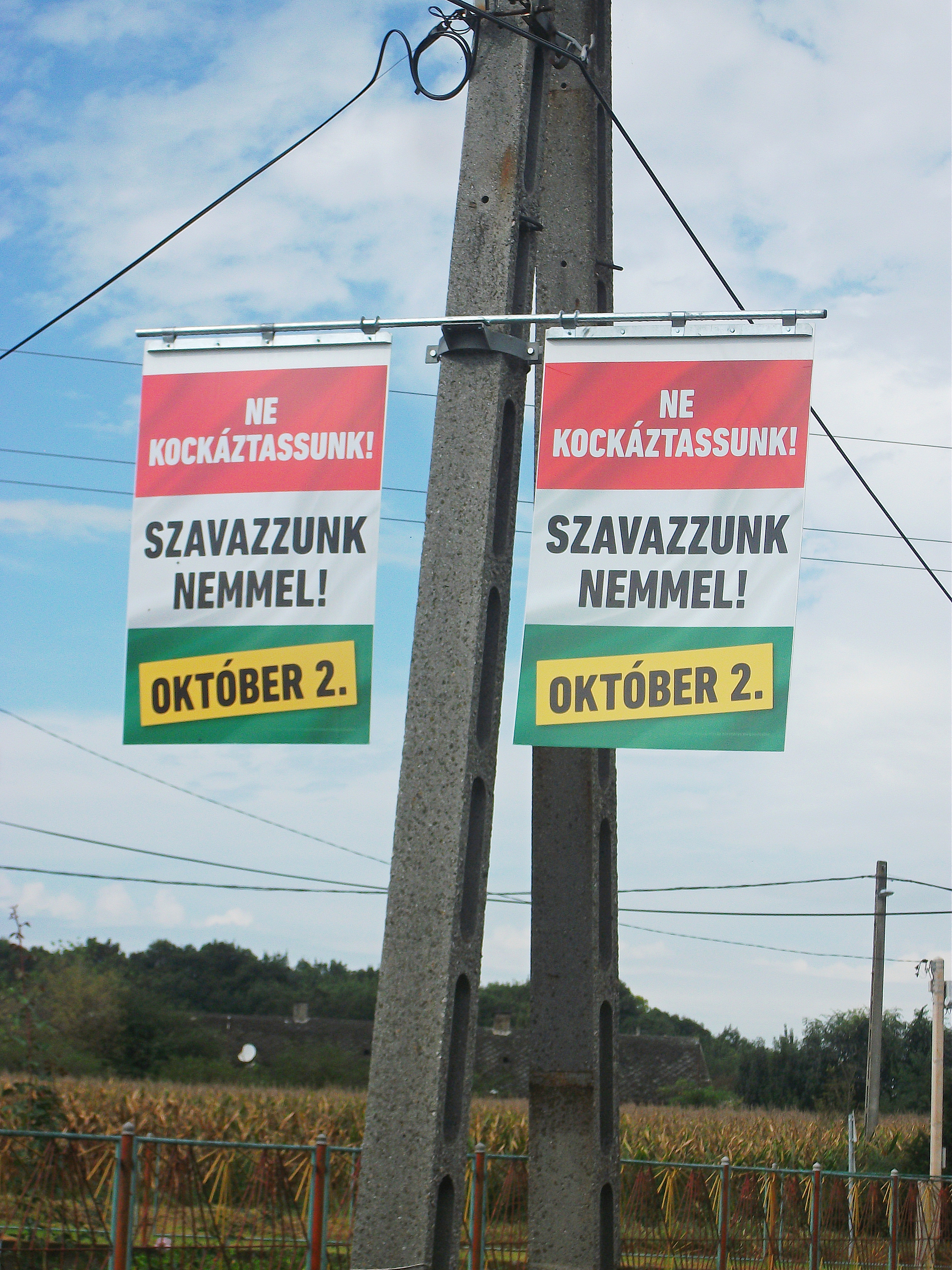
Posters of the government in Zichyújfalu. Subtitle: "Do not take chances!" (red background color) and ("Vote 'no'!") (white background color)

Position	Political parties	Political orientation	Leaders	Ref.
Yes	**Hungarian Liberal Party (MLP)**	Liberalism	Gábor Fodor	
No	**Fidesz – Hungarian Civic Alliance (Fidesz)**	National conservatism	Viktor Orbán	
No	**Christian Democratic People's Party (KDNP)**	Christian democracy	Zsolt Semjén	
No	**Movement for a Better Hungary (Jobbik)**	Radical nationalism	Gábor Vona	
No	Hungarian Workers' Party (MMP)	Communism	Gyula Thürmer	
No	Independent Smallholders' Party (FKgP)	Agrarianism	Péter Hegedüs	
No	Hungarian Justice and Life Party (MIÉP)	Nationalism	Zoltán Fenyvessy	
Boycott	**Hungarian Socialist Party (MSZP)**	Social democracy	Gyula Molnár	
Boycott	**Democratic Coalition (DK)**	Social liberalism	Ferenc Gyurcsány	
Boycott	**Together – Party for a New Era (Együtt)**	Social liberalism	Viktor Szigetvári	
Boycott	**Dialogue for Hungary (PM)**	Green politics	Tímea Szabó; Gergely Karácsony	
Boycott	Modern Hungary Movement (MoMa)	Liberal conservatism	Lajos Bokros	
Boycott	The Motherland Party (HN)	Social conservatism	Árpád Kásler	
Invalid	Hungarian Two-tailed Dog Party (MKKP)	Absurdism	Gergely Kovács	
Neutral	**Politics Can Be Different (LMP)**	Green liberalism	Bernadett Szél; Ákos Hadházy	

Bold: parties with parliamentary representation at the time of the referendum

=== Campaign methods ===
==== Yes ====
The Hungarian Liberal Party (MLP) was the only political party to openly campaign in favour of the compulsory quota system and asked its supporters to vote "yes" in the referendum. On 1 July 2016, party leader Gábor Fodor wrote an open letter to other opposition party leaders asking them to endorse "yes" votes. He wrote that after Brexit, "Europe lost the birthplace of the modern democracy and the primary representative of the Atlantic values", and Orbán's referendum would be another disaster for the European Union. The MLP's foreign policy advisor István Szent-Iványi said in August 2016 that the support of "yes" votes "is the only way to stand up for European values, Hungary's belonging to Europe and European solidarity", and criticized the stances of left-wing parties. He claimed that the EU migrant quota system in fact is a "non-existent legal concept", and argued that the referendum has a "very bad political message" which weakens the cooperation between the European nations.

The Liberals took out a loan of HUF 12 million to pay for 150 billboards with pro-Yes messages, such as "If you stay home, Orbán remains upon us. Vote Yes!" Guy Verhofstadt, the leader of the Alliance of Liberals and Democrats for Europe Group (ALDE), who called the referendum question "leading and manipulative", and said it undermines the common European solution, actively participated in the MLP's campaign. In a video message, he said the Hungarian people was forced to "choose between Hungary and Europe". He urged the voters to "say Yes to Europe, and say Yes to the European future of Hungary!" Former ALDE Party President Graham Watson also expressed his support to the Liberal Party's quota campaign.

Several journalists, bloggers and other opposition parties criticized the Liberal Party's campaign for "Yes" votes, because, as they argued, "participation legitimizes an illegitimate and unconstitutional referendum" and brought the vote total closer to the threshold of validity. Fodor responded that "[A] Yes vote...would mean that Hungary is a constructive member of the European Union ready to share the burden of the refugee crisis facing Europe. Sitting at home...is simply cowardly". Democratic Coalition chairman and former Prime Minister Ferenc Gyurcsány said in an interview at ATV that Fidesz caucus leader Lajos Kósa promised budgetary support to opposition parties (without specific mention of the Liberals) which campaigned for "Yes" votes (the purpose of which would be to raise overall participation to the 50% of the electorate required for such a referendum to be legally valid). The Liberal Party denied this in a press release in September 2016.

==== No ====
According to a public interest disclosure by the prime minister's Cabinet Office in late September 2016, the Fidesz–KDNP government had spent at least HUF 11.3 billion (short-scale; €34 million) on an "information campaign" about migration policy since December 2015. According to the liberal portal 444.hu, the government contracted for this with numerous advertising agencies owned by Fidesz-backed entrepreneurs (for instance, Csaba Csetényi, István Garancsi and Andrew G. Vajna). The government spent that money on advertising through the following: radio stations with national coverage (HUF 391.4 million), websites (HUF 524.7 million), newspapers (HUF 717.5 million), and TV channels (HUF 2.2 billion). As announced at a press conference held by Socialist politician Tamás Harangozó, who requested the disclosure of the data, these amounts include only spending prior to the end of July 2016; Harangozó said the total amount could reach HUF 16 to 17 billion, with the referendum's administrative costs included. In comparison, Fidesz spent only HUF 2.8 billion on its entire campaign during the 2014 parliamentary election. Fidesz-aligned non-governmental organizations and trade unions, like Sándor Lezsák's National Forum, the National Alliance of Hungarian Farmers (Magosz), the Civil Unity Forum (CÖF), the Smallholders' Civic Association (KPE), the Batthyány Society of Professors (PBK), the Association of Christian Intellectuals (KÉSZ), the National Federation of Workers' Councils (MOSZ), the Hungarian Civil Cooperation Association (MPEE) and the Club of Young Families (Ficsak), also aided the campaign with their own funds.

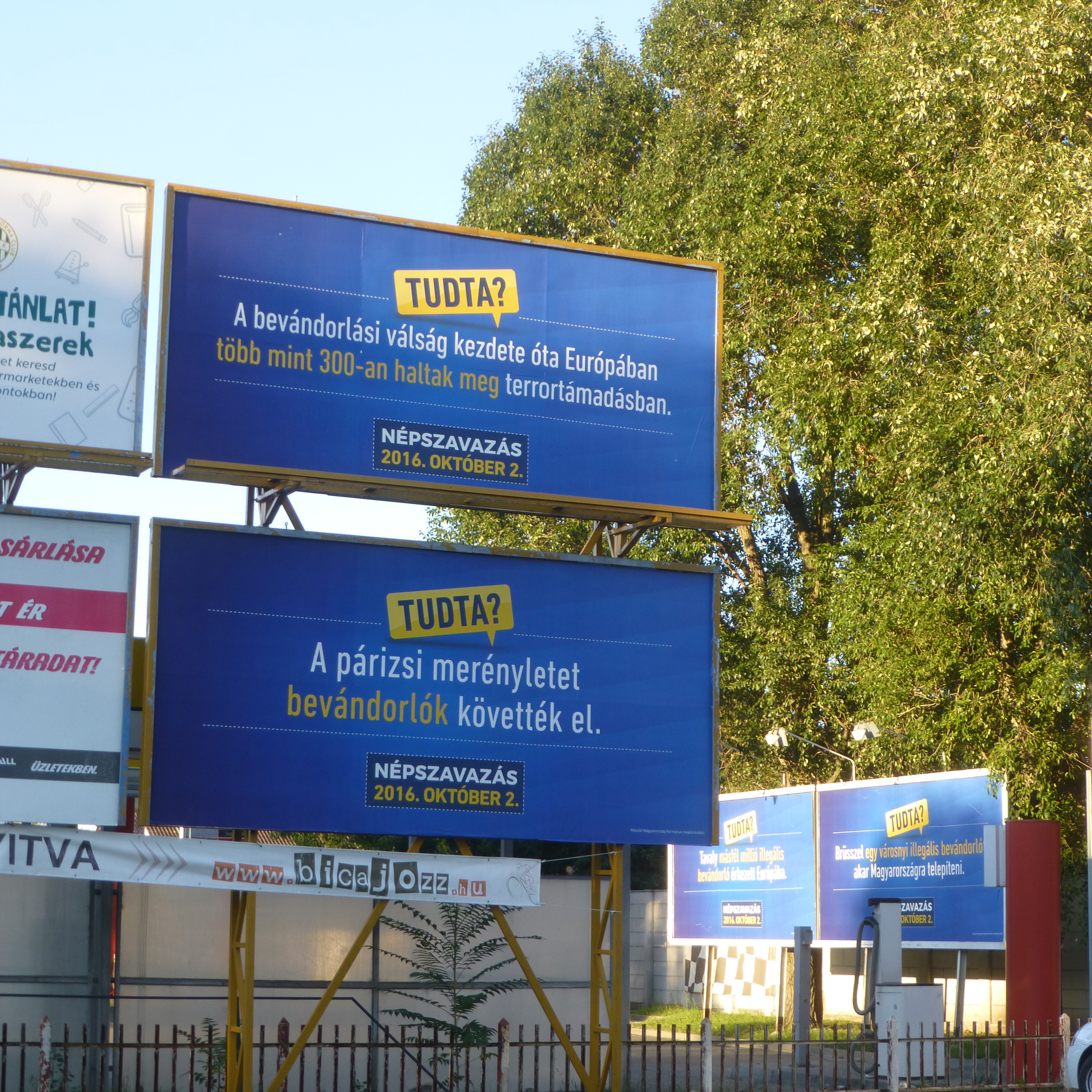
Blue-coloured billboards of the government in Szeged

During the campaign, public spaces and the media were inundated by large billboards with anti-immigrant messages, such as "Did you know? More than 300 people were killed in terrorist attacks in Europe since the start of the migrant crisis", "Did you know? The Paris terrorist attacks were carried out by immigrants", "Did you know? 1,5 million illegal immigrants arrived to Europe in 2015", "Did you know? Brussels wants the forced resettling of a city's worth of illegal immigrants into Hungary", "Did you know? Almost one million immigrants want to come to Europe from Libya alone?" and "Did you know? Since the start of the immigration crisis, sexual harassment of women has increased in Europe?". Several critics described these slogans as "xenophobic" and "racist". Emma Graham-Harrison, a columnist for The Guardian, wrote on 17 September 2016 that the government campaign was characterized by "violent language" and "bitterly contested claims" (including about alleged "no-go zones" throughout Western Europe). A Hungarian Muslim woman, quoted by Al Jazeera, said "I'm starting to feel that my own homeland is repudiating me". John Dalhuisen, director at Amnesty International (AI), said that "Prime Minister Orbán has replaced the rule of law with the rule of fear". Government spokesman Zoltán Kovács denied these accusations and called the messages manifestations of "common sense", adding that "people all over the EU sense that something wrong is happening with migration. What is happening is out of control. We need to regain our ability to reinforce law and order at the borders of the European Union". Nevertheless, multiple surveys showed that xenophobia and distrust towards the asylum-seekers and refugees increased dramatically due to the government campaign. Publicus Intézet found in September 2016 that while two-thirds of respondents expressed tolerance for migrants the previous year, only one-third did so presently. Sociologist Endre Sik, head of the Tárki public opinion research institute, said in the summer of 2016 that "racism and xenophobia in Hungary has reached its peak since 1990". 70 percent of the respondents to a late September survey by Závecz Research agreed with the statement that "influx of refugees increases the risk of terrorism", and 80 percent of the Hungarian population was completely or moderately opposed to refugees and immigrants.

Beside huge billboards, the government's most important campaign method was organization of public forums in the last two weeks to mobilize rural voters, attended by government ministers, state secretaries, members of parliament, pro-government journalists (Zsolt Bayer) and security experts (notably György Nógrádi and Georg Spöttle). These forums became infamous for hard-toned speeches and anti-immigrant and anti-Muslim statements. One of the most provocative events was held in Jászberény on 13 September, during which László Kövér, the Speaker of the National Assembly said about the migration crisis that "this is a war in which weapons are not used". Kövér warned that historical examples prove that migrants are tools to deprive the enemy [Hungarians] of their identity prior to enslaving them. He also said Muslims are "impossible to integrate" and cited the example of German football player Mesut Özil, who he said did not sing Deutschlandlied before matches. Later the German Football Association rejected Kövér's claims. Member of Parliament János Pócs recalled that unidentified Muslim migrants harassed his daughter via Facebook. The mayor of Jászberény, Tamás Szabó, told the town's Romani citizens that if Jászberény is forced to settle immigrants, "this will lead to the reduction of social aid to Hungarian citizens", including for local Romani people. Szabó alsó said that the former Socialist mayor of the town had submitted a document to the government which advocated accepting migrants to mitigate the demographic situation in Jászberény, describing this as proof that the left-wing parties supported immigration. In Tápiógyörgye, security policy expert Georg Spöttle said the "financial resources of the country should not be given to the migrants, those who do not respect the law, wade across borders, and yet nothing do nothing good for them, but only demand". The two Fidesz-member deputy mayors of Csepel told their community that if the Hungarian government lost this fight against the EU, residents of 1,475 municipal apartments would be evicted from their homes to make way for migrants.

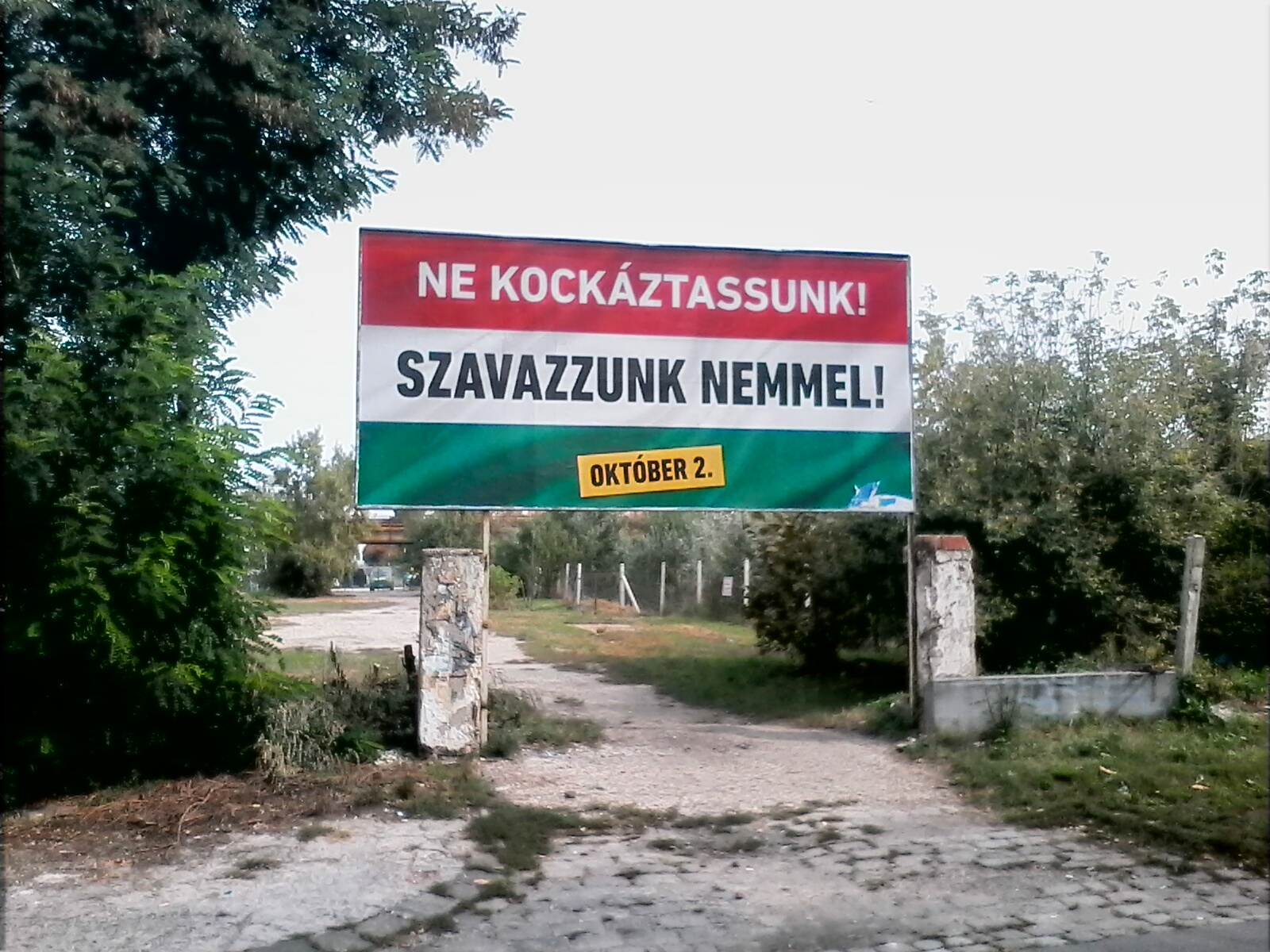
One of the government's billboards, advocating a "no" vote

As recommended by the government, approximately 2,000 of the 3,200 local authorities adopted resolutions against migrant resettlement quotas until the end of September 2016. In several places (such as Gödöllő and Tapolca), local Fidesz politicians warned their communities that places which do not make a clear stand against the "forced resettlement quota" are more likely to receive migrants for settlement if the government "loses the battle against Brussels". During a public forum, government member János Lázár argued "in that places where the overwhelming majority of the population adopted an obstructive attitude against quotas in the referendum, migrants can not be settled because the government wants to avoid a confrontation. However, where the voters testify their disinterest, [the government will interpret this as] disinterest [whether] migrants arrive there or not". Many considered these remarks a "threat", part of the Fidesz's "political blackmail" and "threat"; Lázár repudiated this interpretation. Prime Minister Viktor Orbán claimed that EU leaders had made secret deals with Hungarian towns governed by left-wing politicians (such as Szeged, Zugló, Ajka and Salgótarján) to accept migrants, bypassing the national government. He cited EP President Martin Schulz's earlier words in an interview that "even in Hungary there are places where migrants are not sent back", and explicitly named Szeged, where "all refugees could safely go". Socialist politician László Botka, the mayor of Szeged, criticized Orbán and said that "the insanity within Fidesz rose to a new level, because they are [seriously claiming] that a simple mayor can agree on resettlement of migrants with the President of the European Parliament. It is so surreal that there are no longer words against it". Tamás Wittinghoff, the mayor of Budaörs, claimed that local governments were "under direct pressure to adopt anti-quota resolutions", as "uncooperative" authorities were being threatened with much less budgetary support from the national government. Imre Attila Nagy, the mayor of Győrújfalu, urged local residents to vote "No", because, as he reasoned, their "...tenders for infrastructure investments will [get] preferential treatment by the government, if the...local turnout in the referendum exceeds the county and national average".

In the last days of the campaign, Viktor Orbán gave numerous interviews to pro-government media to convince people of the importance of voting. On 22 September, he said to Origo.hu that "if the referendum is valid and conclusive, its consequences are of a different nature, compared to a more stunted one". He added that "[opposing] the forced quota is the cause of all of the 3,200 local governments" and also called 2 October "3,200 local referendums at the same time". He expressed certainty that the referendum would "determine the fate of future generations", saying that "I love this country, and I do not want to see anyone change it under orders from outside". In response to the opposition's endorsement of boycott, he said that this was "an issue which far outstrips party loyalty...This is the second time that the Hungarian left has been unable to rise above self-interest – as I think that the earlier referendum on dual citizenship was also an issue of national interest". Orbán was interviewed by M1 national channel on 27 September, and said that "We do not allow them [EU institutions] to take away from us the right of exclusive control over the question of who we want to live with here in Hungary and who we don't want to live with", adding that "I love my homeland and I want it to remain just the way it is". He also stated that a better way to assist refugees would be "to take aid to where they live, instead of allowing the problems into Europe". However, on 29 September, after releases of unfavorable data about the expected voter turnout, Orbán already told Katolikus Rádió that "the participation in the referendum has no political significance", but also said that the result will show whether "Hungarians indeed form a community, or just randomly live together". He also said that the "compulsory quota system was accepted via the defrauding of four member states – Hungary, Czech Republic, Slovakia and Romania [countries which voted against the relocation plan on 22 September 2015]". During an interview in TV2 on 30 September, he said "migration is an issue about which if we make a mistake, we will not be able to correct it anymore". Orbán published a lengthy essay to Magyar Idők on 1 October, writing that "We, Hungarians find ourselves in the mainstream once every thirty years", referring to the Hungarian Revolution of 1956, the removal of Hungary's border fence with Austria in 1989 and the current migration crisis, and asserting that "Hungary is the only EU Member State in which the people are asked on the subject of immigration". He added "Simple mathematical operations can be performed to realize that they [migrants] will win this silent battle – if we do nothing".

The radical nationalist Jobbik party welcomed Orbán's plan to hold a referendum on the EU's migrant resettlement plans, but also accused the government of double talk. Four days before the announcement of a referendum, party spokesperson Dániel Z. Kárpát said that Viktor Orbán, along with the other heads of governments, signed the final document which concluded the European Council Summit of 18–19 February 2016, and that this document endorsed the EU compulsory resettlement quota along with the Brexit deal, accusing Orbán of "betrayal". Government spokesperson Zoltán Kovács responded that the "opposition misinterprets the final document". Jobbik agreed with the intention of referendum, but would have preferred amending the Hungarian constitution to limit immigration.

After President Áder announced the referendum date on 5 July 2016, Jobbik spokesman Ádám Mirkóczki stated that the party opposed the quota system, as it did "every meaningless dictate from Brussels". But the party maintains its position, he added, that a constitutional amendment would be a "much faster and easier solution", while a referendum without a valid legal outcome would damage enforcement of Hungarian interests. In August, party leader Gábor Vona encouraged Hungarians to vote "No", arguing that "in such national matters, everyone should have to transcend the party political interests". However, he noted, an invalid referendum outcome would be a "weapon in the hands of Brussels" against the Hungarian government's position, adding that "Eastern Europe still has a choice to decide, whether it wants multiculturalism which requires from the majority to give up its European identity..." In September 2016, Vona called the referendum as an "irresponsible decision" in his parliamentary speech. He said: "Fidesz has no interest in solving the migration crisis, but such a political gamble may pose significant risks". He stated that if the referendum result were invalid, Prime Minister Viktor Orbán "must resign" as he has "taken personal responsibility for the initiative".

Some parties not represented in Parliament also rejected the European Union migrant quota system. Gyula Thürmer, long-time leader of the Hungarian Workers' Party (MMP, a party of communist ideology) emphasized that his party "says no to the EU's aggression". He said that EU leaders' intervention in the Middle East led to the current migrant crisis. The Independent Smallholders, Agrarian Workers and Civic Party (FKgP) argued that "threat [to the Hungarian nation] is not a party political issue" and everyone should say "No" to the quotas, even though Fidesz would use the eventual success to its own benefit. They also quoted 17th-century poet Miklós Zrínyi's famous motto: "Do not hurt the Hungarians!" The Hungarian Justice and Life Party (MIÉP) reminded the public that they were the only parliamentary party which had opposed the referendum on joining the EU in 2003. The MIÉP criticized the Two-tailed Dog Party's counter-campaign and also tried to mock its satirical slogans.

None of the major churches issued official statements on the subject of the quota referendum, but numerous prelates and clerics delivered their opinions individually. Metropolitan Péter Fülöp Kocsis, head of the Hungarian Greek Catholic Church openly said that he will vote "No", as did István Bogárdi Szabó, the Clerical President of the Synod of the Reformed Church in Hungary; Sándor Németh, the senior pastor of the Faith Church; Imre Kozma, the president of the Hungarian Charity Service of the Sovereign Military Order of Malta; Slomó Köves, Executive Rabbi of the Unified Hungarian Jewish Congregation; and Sándor Szenczy, the president of the Hungarian Baptist Aid. Gyula Márfi, Archbishop of Veszprém; Béla Balás, Bishop of Kaposvár; and Miklós Beer, Bishop of Vác also expressed opposition to the quota system, as did the well-known Franciscan friar Csaba Böjte. According to the Heti Válasz's list, only Rabbi Zoltán Radnóti, the president of the Federation of Jewish Communities (Mazsihisz), said he will boycott the referendum. Archabbot Asztrik Várszegi called the government's campaign "violent" and "propagandistic", and, as he put it, this type of communication "blocks the thinking".

This was the first referendum since 1989 in which suffrage was extended to Hungarian citizens who do not have a permanent residence in Hungary (see Hungarian diaspora). As a result, several ethnic Hungarian parties and organizations became involved in the campaign. The Autonomy Council in the Carpathian Basin (KMAT), led by László Tőkés, urged people to participate in the referendum and vote "No". The alliance adopted a joint statement, signed by the Hungarian National Council of Transylvania (EMNT), the Szekler National Council (SZNT), the Hungarian People's Party of Transylvania (EMNP), the Hungarian Civic Party (MPP), The Party of the Hungarian Community (MKP), the Hungarian Democratic Party of Vojvodina, the Hungarian Democratic Community of Vojvodina, the Democratic Union of Hungarians of Croatia (HMDK), the Alliance of Vojvodina Hungarians (VMSZ), the Hungarian National Self-Governing Community of Pomurje (MMÖNK), the Hungarian Cultural Federation of Transcarpathia (KMKSZ), and others. István Pásztor, the president of the Alliance of Vojvodina Hungarians emphasized that "there is no contradiction" between the VMSZ's campaign in Hungary and the position of the Serbian government. He said "The Vojvodina Hungarians are part of the nation, and the quota referendum is a national issue".

==== Boycott ====
Since March 2015, the Hungarian Socialist Party (MSZP) tried to initiate a referendum against that new regulations, which banned shops from opening on Sundays. However the intention of the party was prevented on several occasions, sometimes under scandalous circumstances. Thus the government's initiative on quota referendum was considered as a distraction from these legal abuses by the MSZP. In July, deputy chairman Zoltán Gőgös suggested on the quota referendum that "everybody should stay at home to stay in Europe". He added, the "people have to show to Orbán that they choose the European community instead of Kazakhstan and Azerbaijan". During these early months, the MSZP concentrated on its own referendum plan related to the land law adopted by the Fidesz government in 2013. However the party was unable to collect the required amount of 200,000 signatures. Albeit MSZP decided to stay away from the quota referendum, the party still avoided the use of the word "boycott" to distinguish itself from the Democratic Coalition (DK).

The Socialist Party was not able to convey a unified political message and position to its supporters. Former party leader László Kovács urged to vote invalidly to "vote yes for our country remain a member of the European Union". The Szombathely branch of the party also argued for invalid vote. Eszter Móricz, a local representative of the party in the 15th district of Budapest declared "as a private individual" that she will vote "No" as a "devout Christian woman". She added that situation should be avoided, when a woman will be forced to fear from the enforcement of Sharia in Hungary. After that statement, her party membership was suspended by the MSZP's ethics committee several days later. In response, Móricz announced that she will not participate in the referendum. On 31 August 2016, the new party chairman Gyula Molnár said "MSZP is ready to support the government in the fight against compulsory resettlement quota if the European Union is indeed planning to take such steps". However, as noted, he considered the referendum without legal consequences. His words caused a great uproar among the opposition community. Later that day, Molnár corrected and refined his assertion, and emphasized the "senseless nature" of the referendum. In addition, the Socialist Party campaigned for boycott with the word "Yes" in a poster. Several critics said the Socialist Party became a satellite organization to the Fidesz (or at least "His Majesty's loyal opposition") to increase the uncertainty among the opposition voters. An Index.hu analysis noted the MSZP has run into difficulty because the majority of its voters positioned themselves against the EU's immigration policy and the quota system. Further increasing the communication confusion, Somogy County branch leader Gábor Harangozó accused the government to intends to settle migrants to municipal accommodations throughout the country.

The Democratic Coalition (DK) stated immediately after Orbán's announcement that the party will boycott the referendum. According to Népszabadság, party leaders Gyula Molnár (MSZP) and Ferenc Gyurcsány (DK) agreed that both parties will use the same slogan: "Stay at home, Stay in Europe!". However Socialist spokesperson István Nyakó nuanced the journal's information: "There is agreement [in this issue], but there is no co-operation". Gyurcsány argued in September 2016, that the government considers the referendum as an "early parliamentary election". He added, "there is no governance for years" and the cabinet intends to hide the existing economic difficulties under the migrant issue and the quota referendum campaign. According to Gyurcsány, the Fidesz leads Hungary to a "historic blind alley". On 16 September, Gyurcsány claimed the Fidesz government will initiate an early parliamentary election, if the quota referendum will be valid. He said Orbán "builds a new political community through fear and hate campaign [...]". Few days later, Gyurcsány told that he received this information from the inner circle of Prime Minister Orbán. During an interview, Orbán refused Gyurcsány's allegations. The Prime Minister said "early parliamentary election is often a sneaking matter". The Democratic Coalition published its own campaign song in September 2016, the chorus was "Do not say no, do not say yes, the answer does not mean anything, if the question is liar". One day before the September 2016 Budapest explosion, board member György Kakuk called on the government not to perform any simulated bomb attack in order to increasing willingness to vote. He compared the government's "hate campaign" to pre-1945 era. The party held a peaceful demonstration in front of the Hungarian Parliament Building on 1 October, when thousands of DK sympathizers joined their hands to form a human chain around the building. Gyurcsány said during the event that the government is trying to "steal the greater part of the honesty of Hungary, however the democratic opposition will be able to prevent that". Far-right elements sought to prevent the demonstration, but they failed, when DK supporters sang Himnusz.

Two other minor left-wing parliamentary parties, the Together (Együtt) and the Dialogue for Hungary (PM), and a liberal conservative extra-parliamentary force, the Modern Hungary Movement (MoMa) announced to campaign jointly and urged their voters to stay away from the referendum. On 1 September, the party leaders presented their joint poster which showed a couple sitting on sofa who giving the finger to the government's campaign message on TV. "For a stupid question, this is the answer!" and "Who stay at home, votes for Europe" slogans appeared in that poster. MoMa president Lajos Bokros told "there is no right answer to a nefarious question". Együtt leader Viktor Szigetvári said "we are disgusted from what Viktor Orbán is doing with this country". According to Dialogue for Hungary co-chair Gergely Karácsony, "this referendum is one of the biggest political swindles in recent decades". He added, the government, beside their money, is trying to steal people's "soul" and "benevolence" too. Formerly the Together said "Orbán's populist politics is resulting a sliding and unthrifty Hungary". According to the party, the only alternative are the "peace and European cooperation". The PM considered the referendum as a "gigantic scam" which serves only the communication and policy goals of Fidesz. The party added "if Hungary accepts EU aids and sums, must be involved too in the solution of common problems". The PM intended to organize a protest to the day of the referendum, but after a legal complaint by Fidesz MP Gergely Gulyás, the National Election Committee (NVB) found it unlawful, as according to the election law, a rally cannot hold on the day of the referendum. As a result, the party, alongside MSZP, which also canceled its planned rally named "Free Europe Day" after the decision, protested in front of the NVI headquarters because of its presumptive pro-government political decisions. Co-leader Karácsony noted how ironic that International Day of Non-Violence and Gandhi Jayanti are observed on October 2, the birthday of Mahatma Gandhi. After that Gergely Karácsony and MSZP chairman Gyula Molnár covered the sign of the National Election Office with a "Fidesz Election Office" door plate. During a MoMa protest on 25 September, a young speaker said "The House Speaker [László Kövér] and Zsolt Bayer [a Fidesz-ally journalist, he is known for harsh tone articles] are the threat to our culture, and not the Islam".

==== Invalid ====
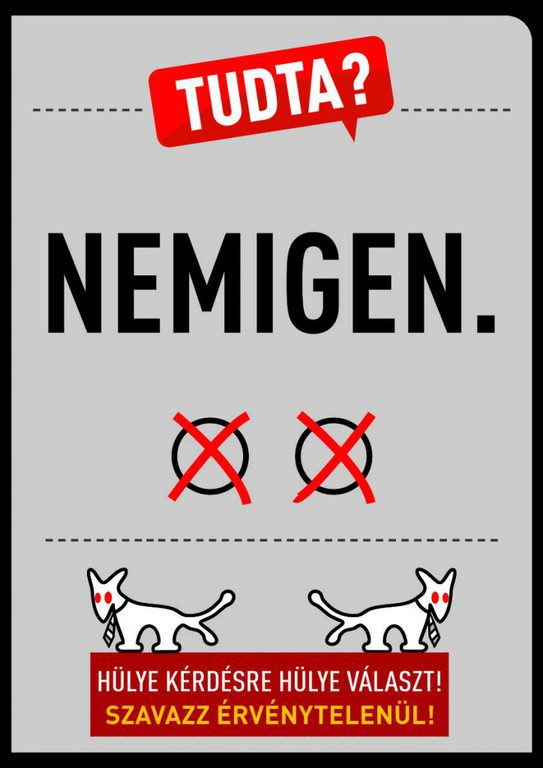
A poster of the Two-tailed Dog Party: "Did you know? Hardly. (Literally: ´No yes.´)" and "Stupid Answer to a Stupid Question! Vote invalidly!"

The Hungarian Two-tailed Dog Party (MKKP) was closely involved in the quota referendum campaign, mocking the government's anti-immigrant messages and phrases. The party spent €100,000 (the most of all the opposition parties) of voluntary donations from 4,000 people on their posters with satirical slogans, such as "Did you know there's a war in Syria?", "Did you know one million Hungarians want to emigrate to Europe?", "Did you know? The perpetrators in most corruption cases are politicians", "Did you know? A tree may fall on your head?", "Did you know? The average Hungarian is more likely to see a UFO than a refugee in his lifetime" and "Did you know? During the Olympics, the biggest danger to Hungarian participants came from foreign competitors". Party leader Gergely Kovács told BBC News that "[...] What we can do is appeal to the millions in Hungary who are upset by the government campaign. We want them to know they are not alone". Thus the party asked the people to cast invalid ballots.

In an interview by The Budapest Times on 17 September 2016, after the party launched its counter-campaign, Kovács said that Orbán created a "phenomenon" from a real European problem, and the government "is trying to portray every migrant as a potential terrorist". He mentioned that according to the European Union quota system, Hungary should settle only 1,294 asylum seekers, and he thinks that "there must be at least so much humanity in a country that this is not a question at all". Kovács told The Guardian that the Fidesz politicians "want people to talk about the nonexistent migrants" instead of corruption scandals and the catastrophic situation in the health sector. "I've never seen so much hate in this country before," he added. The MKKP also used the "Stupid Answer to a Stupid Question! Vote invalidly!" slogan in its billboards. The party also developed a mobile application, through which any voter could show an invalid ballot on the day of the referendum.

During the campaign, some MKKP posters were vandalized and torn down. There were unconfirmed reports that some Fidesz-led local governments in the Budapest area (such as Terézváros and Újbuda) and elsewhere, sent public workers to hide or to tear down the Two-tailed Party posters. The governments accused of this did not respond to requests for comment. After these incidents, the MKKP restarted its voluntary donation campaign to fund purchase of new posters. The National Election Committee (NVB) said that vandalism of MKKP posters in Szombathely was a violation of Hungarian election law, but declared that the perpetrators could not be identified. On 22 September, a teenage activist for the MKKP was attacked by a taxi driver in Szentendre after the boy told him that damaging during the campaign period is illegal.

Besides the Two-tailed Dog Party, the Hungarian Civil Liberties Union (TASZ) and the Hungarian Helsinki Committee also encouraged casting invalid votes. According to the TASZ, the government was "abusing" the referendum system, and its campaign was "fundamentally incompatible with a human rights approach". The Hungarian Helsinki Committee argued in favor of invalid votes that "the difference is in the message. The act of boycott is only the passive rejection of the forced referendum", while casting invalid votes is more effective as it cannot be misinterpreted. In a declaration issued on 14 September, 22 NGOs, including TASZ, the Helsinki Committee, the Eötvös Károly Institute, the Methodist Hungarian Evangelical Fellowship, the Migration Aid and the Belletrist Association jointly announced their support for casting invalid votes, referring to the government campaign as "senseless" and "inhuman". István László Mészáros, a former SZDSZ MP, responded by announcing his resignation from the Helsinki Committee because the NGO had "entered into party politics" and "as an organization, which [was] once dedicated to the values of democracy and the rights of citizens...is campaigning against a referendum, one of the most important institutions of democracy". The Helsinki Committee responded that "the government makes a mockery of the institution of referendum...and it serves only a political campaign based on xenophobia". The organization held a 'Refugees Welcome' rally with the slogan "See the Human!" on 30 September, also attended by directors Béla Tarr and Róbert Alföldi, actor András Bálint, and poet Virág Erdős. The Hungarian Helsinki Committee argued that the "...majority of these people [refugees] are children! Europe, including Hungary, means the only chance and hope for them".

==== Neutral ====
The Politics Can Be Different (LMP) went through a change in leadership in the summer of 2016, after co-president András Schiffer announced his retirement from politics on 31 May. The party decided not to participate in the campaign and did not deliver its position on the issue. Co-president Bernadett Szél clarified the opinion of the party at the Bálványos Free Summer University in July in Băile Tușnad, Romania. She participated in a debate with Fidesz caucus leader Lajos Kósa, where she said "the issue of migration was always a national competence", and claimed the referendum initiative is a "trickery to exercise of power". She added the LMP will argue in favour of neither of the options. Formerly some intellectuals, including Gáspár Miklós Tamás, criticized her participation in the Fidesz-backed free university and false reports accused that Szél urged the party supporters to vote "No" during the event. Nevertheless, both co-leaders of the party (Szél and the newly elected Ákos Hadházy) decided to boycott the referendum. Szél later said that the government used the quota referendum to divert attention from the much lower wages in Hungary than the European Union average.

=== Delegates to election committees ===
A total of 10,331 polling stations were established nationwide for the quota referendum. According to the election system, every parties with parliamentary group (therefore Fidesz, MSZP, Jobbik, KDNP and LMP) were allowed to register and send a maximum of two delegates to each committee until the deadline of 22 September 2016. The number of delegates were shared in the following way:

Political parties	Number of delegates
Fidesz – Hungarian Civic Alliance (Fidesz)	13,880 / 20,662
Hungarian Socialist Party (MSZP)	4,012 / 20,662
Christian Democratic People's Party (KDNP)	279 / 20,662
Movement for a Better Hungary (Jobbik)	175 / 20,662
Politics Can Be Different (LMP)	41 / 20,662

According to these figures, opposition parties (MSZP, Jobbik and LMP) have sent delegates to less than 40 percent of the 10,331 polling stations. As an Index.hu analysis noted, the passivity of Jobbik and LMP in this respect is understandable: the previous one is campaigning for "no" votes, in line with the Fidesz–KDNP government, while the latter party remained disinterested (neutral) and boycotted the whole procedure. By comparison, as article author Szabolcs Dull noted, the low number of the MSZP observers raises many questions. The number of delegates by counties showed that the left-wing opposition party appointed zero delegates in Győr-Moson-Sopron County (450 polling committees), but the MSZP remained passive in several other counties too. Previously, the Socialist Party warned of probable "fraud" and "lawlessness" among the election committees, and agreed with four other parties (DK, Együtt, PM and MoMa, none of them have parliamentary caucus) to send observers jointly under MSZP banner. According to unconfirmed reports, voluntary application of DK activists as delegates were refused by local MSZP officials in some counties, because they did not want to bother with administrative obligations during the registration procedure.

Political Capital analyst Róbert László opined that current situation "significantly increases the risk of fraud". He added, the low number of left-wing opposition delegates indicates "more to the current condition of these parties than do the research polls showing their popularity". In contrast, Szabolcs Dull argued that there is not really a significant possibility of manipulation regarding the local election turnout, as voters could check their signature in the committees' report for 90 days after the election.

=== The issue of a possible debate ===
On 23 September 2016, Jobbik leader Gábor Vona challenged Prime Minister Viktor Orbán and Socialist chairman Gyula Molnár to a public debate. He justified the move that "party leaders usually confront their point of view before such a significant event in civilized countries". He reminded the public that Orbán did not attend a public political debate since the 2006 parliamentary election, where he was defeated by incumbent premier Gyurcsány according to the majority opinion. Orbán rejected the possibility of a wide-ranging debate again. His press agent, Bertalan Havasi said Orbán "continues to consider the referendum as a national issue, which transcends party interests". Gyula Molnár, however, said he is ready to take part in the public debate, suggesting other issues beside the quota referendum. Eventually, due to the refusal and absence of the Prime Minister, there has been no debate, similarly to the last two parliamentary elections.

== Opinion polls ==
Date(s) conducted	"Yes"	"No"	Invalid	Undecided	Certain voters	Sample size	Conducted by	Polling type
Exit poll	5% (Note: Percentages within valid votes)	95%	5%	N/A	42%	1,000	Nézőpont	Direct
24–28 Sep 2016	6%	64%	9%	21%	46%	1,000	Publicus	Telephone
21–27 Sep 2016	5%	70%	9%	16%	51%	1,000	Republikon	Direct
15–19 Sep 2016	6%	61%	11%	22%	54%	1,000	Publicus	Telephone
6–10 Sep 2016	3%	78%	N/A	19%	55%	1,000	Századvég	Telephone
end of Aug 2016	4%	73%	6%	17%	48%	1,000	Republikon	Direct
end of Aug 2016	9%	69%	2%	20%	53%	1,000	ZRI	Telephone
15–22 Aug 2016	15%	67%	N/A	18%	53%	1,000	Publicus	Telephone
~9 Aug 2016	13%	71%	N/A	16%	43%	N/A	Tárki	N/A
end of July 2016	7%	74%	3%	16%	42%	1,000	Republikon	Direct
25–31 July 2016	9%	77%	N/A	14%	53%	1,000	ZRI	Telephone
1–6 July 2016	18%	64%	N/A	18%	50%	1,000	Publicus	Telephone
13–19 May 2016	23%	77%	N/A	N/A	62%	1,000	Nézőpont	Telephone
11–15 May 2016	11%	87%	N/A	2%	54%	~1,000	Századvég	Telephone
24–26 Feb 2016	10%	84%	N/A	6%	N/A	500	Századvég	Telephone

== Results ==
Turnout in the quota referendum by counties - just the valid votes

The number of valid votes cast was required to be equivalent to 50% of the registered voters for the referendum to be valid. Overall turnout was 44.04%, although without the invalid vote, it was 41.32%.

Choice	Votes	%
For	56,163	1.64
Against	3,362,224	98.36
Total	3,418,387	100.00
Valid votes	3,418,387	93.83
Invalid/blank votes	224,668	6.17
Total votes	3,643,055	100.00
Registered voters/turnout	8,272,625	44.04
Source: National Election Office

Turnout
07:00	09:00	11:00	13:00	15:00	17:30	Overall
1.16%	7.25%	16.37%	23.56%	30.66%	39.88%	44.04%

== Reactions and analysis ==
=== Domestic ===
==== Government ====
Even after publication of exit polls at 7 PM, Fidesz MP Gergely Gulyás evaluated the migrant quota referendum as "an overwhelming victory", regardless of the low turnout. He said "we consider the decision of the voters as compulsory on our part", and called the probably legally invalid referendum "valid in political terms". He emphasized that more people voted against the quota system than voted in favour of the joining the European Union in the 2003 referendum. Deputy Prime Minister and KDNP leader Zsolt Semjén also said the government received mandate from the voters to "defend the country against the compulsory quota". He added "on Christian and humanitarian grounds, there will be caritas towards the migrants and self-defense towards the migratory phenomenon at the same time". He pointed out migrants are also "victims", but their problem should be resolved at the source, and not in Europe.

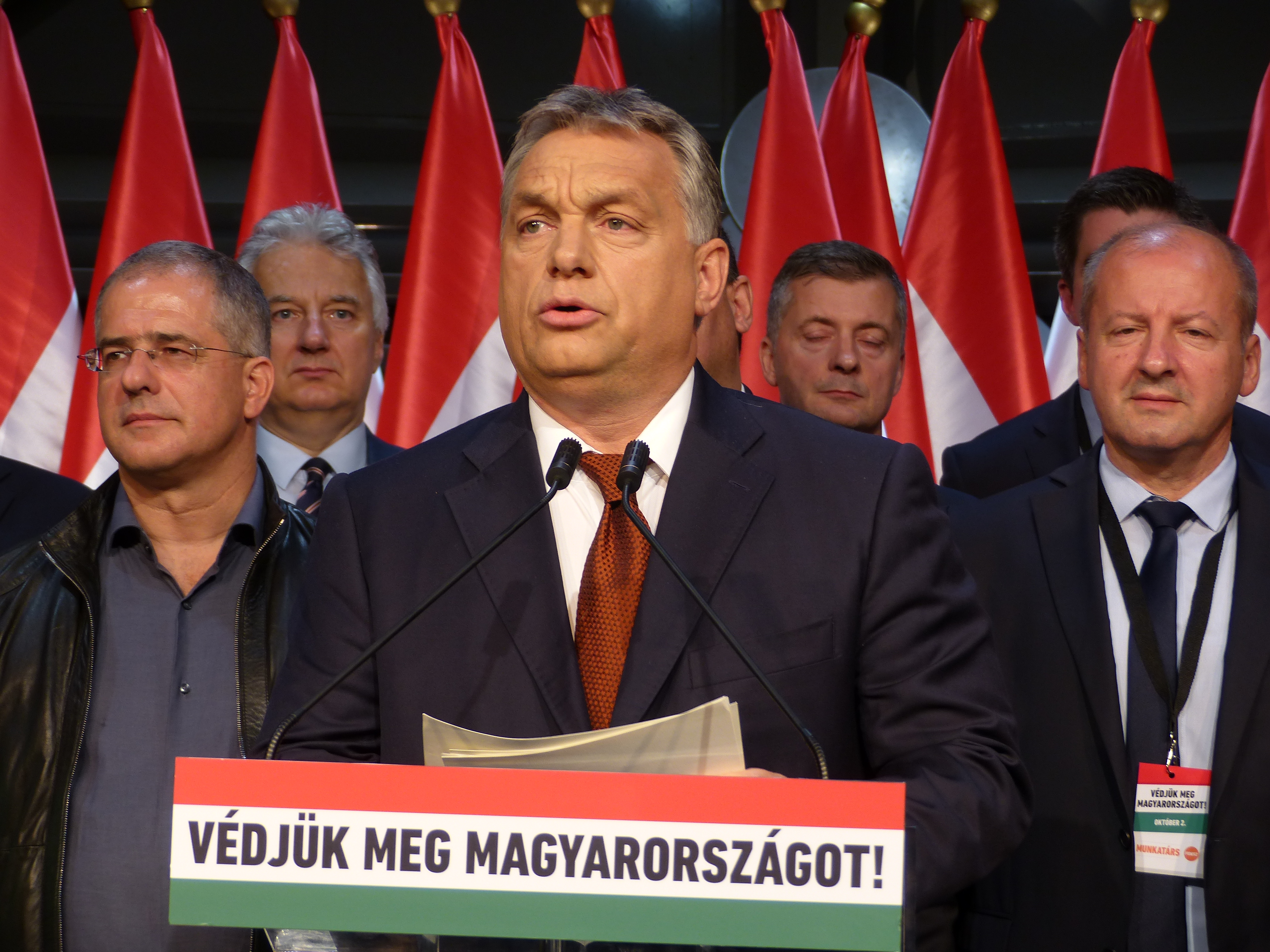
Viktor Orbán declares the government's victory after the publication of the preliminary result on the eve of the referendum. Subtitle: "Let us defend Hungary!"

In his evening speech at Bálna Centre, Viktor Orbán declared the government's victory despite the low turnout which rendered the referendum invalid. He emphasized Hungary became the first and only EU member state which "managed to hold a referendum on the migrant issue, which determines the future of our children and grandchildren". As he argued, "92% of those who voted in a referendum [...] said, they do not agree with Brussels' intention [on migration quotas]". He said the referendum result will be a "strong enough weapon at Brussels", and urged EU policymakers to take note the result and the "Hungarians' will". "Brussels or Budapest, this was the question, and we decided that only Budapest enjoys the right of decision", he added. Orbán also announced, in accordance with the "politically valid" term, that the government will initiate the seventh amendment of the fundamental law of Hungary as the "appropriate, honest and necessary step is to give legal weight to the will of the Hungarians". In his short speech, Orbán did not mention the invalid outcome of the referendum, and the organizers did not allow for the domestic and foreign press to ask questions of the Prime Minister. In the following days, pro-government media (for instance, M1 state television, Magyar Idők, Magyar Hírlap, Origo.hu, 888.hu or Riposzt) avoided the "invalid" phrase too and did not refer the relatively low turnout, and instead, they highlighted the fact that 98% of participants voted against the admission of refugees to Hungary.

Csaba Dömötör, the Deputy Minister of the prime minister's Cabinet Office, gave an interview to Origo.hu on the eve of referendum, where he said "if 3 million votes were enough to join the European Union [in the 2003 referendum], now, roughly 3 million votes should be enough to say No to the enforced settlement system". During the referendum, a majority of Hungarians expressed support for the government policy on the migration issue, he added.

==== Opposition ====
Jobbik issued a statement immediately after the end of the voting procedure. Party spokesperson Mirkóczki said Orbán "irresponsibly brought the country into a gamble and [...] he failed." He also called the Fidesz's campaign as "arrogant, insolent and sometimes extortionist". Party leader Gábor Vona said Orbán "revived the quota system" with the invalid referendum and the Prime Minister "scored an own goal". He argued EU leaders will only consider the invalid nature of the referendum, ignoring the overwhelming superiority of "No" votes. On 3 October, Vona told Orbán in the parliamentary plenary session that the government had weakened Hungary's positions in Brussels on the issue of quota system with the failed referendum. According to him, Orbán used this undoubtedly national vital question for his own domestic political and party communication purposes, while the Jobbik formerly had proposed a constitutional amendment without political risks. He said his party "always rejected the quota system, that's why I am angry with you [Orbán] and that's why I demand your resignation". He argued Orbán need to step down, as David Cameron did it following the Brexit referendum, "as is the norm in European politics".

Hungarian Socialist Party leader Gyula Molnár stated the invalid referendum has become in fact a "very expensive opinion poll" and added, "things will return to normal" on 3 October after a "shameful, deceitful and unlawful hate campaign". He said the invalid outcome of the referendum proved that "it is possible to defeat the Fidesz government and Viktor Orbán at the ballot box." As a result, he suggested a cooperation of "democratic opposition" parties to nominate single joint candidate in each constituency for the next parliamentary election in order to a unified action against Fidesz. "We will build a coalition from the majority of Hungarians who are losers of society due to this government's activity", he added. In response to Orbán's announcement, he said that any government step to amend the constitution based on an invalid referendum would be "unconstitutional". Molnár also announced the MSZP would initiate setting up a parliamentary ad hoc committee to investigate government spending public funds on the referendum.

Democratic Coalition chairman and former prime minister Ferenc Gyurcsány told "We won. Not a little, but a lot", ironically evoking his infamous Őszöd speech from May 2006. "The left has waited for a real victory for the past ten years [since the 2006 national election], and today this has finally happened", and called Orbán to resign as "all prime ministers would do this in any normal and democratic country" after a such "obvious defeat". Similarly Molnár, Gyurcsány also looked ahead to the 2018 parliamentary election, when he said "constructive and responsible talks about election cooperation" among the so-called democratic opposition parties must be begun immediately. On that evening in a Heti Világgazdaság quick interview, Gyurcsány said every left-wing party must unite into a single big tent opposition party to jointly overcome the "Orbán regime".

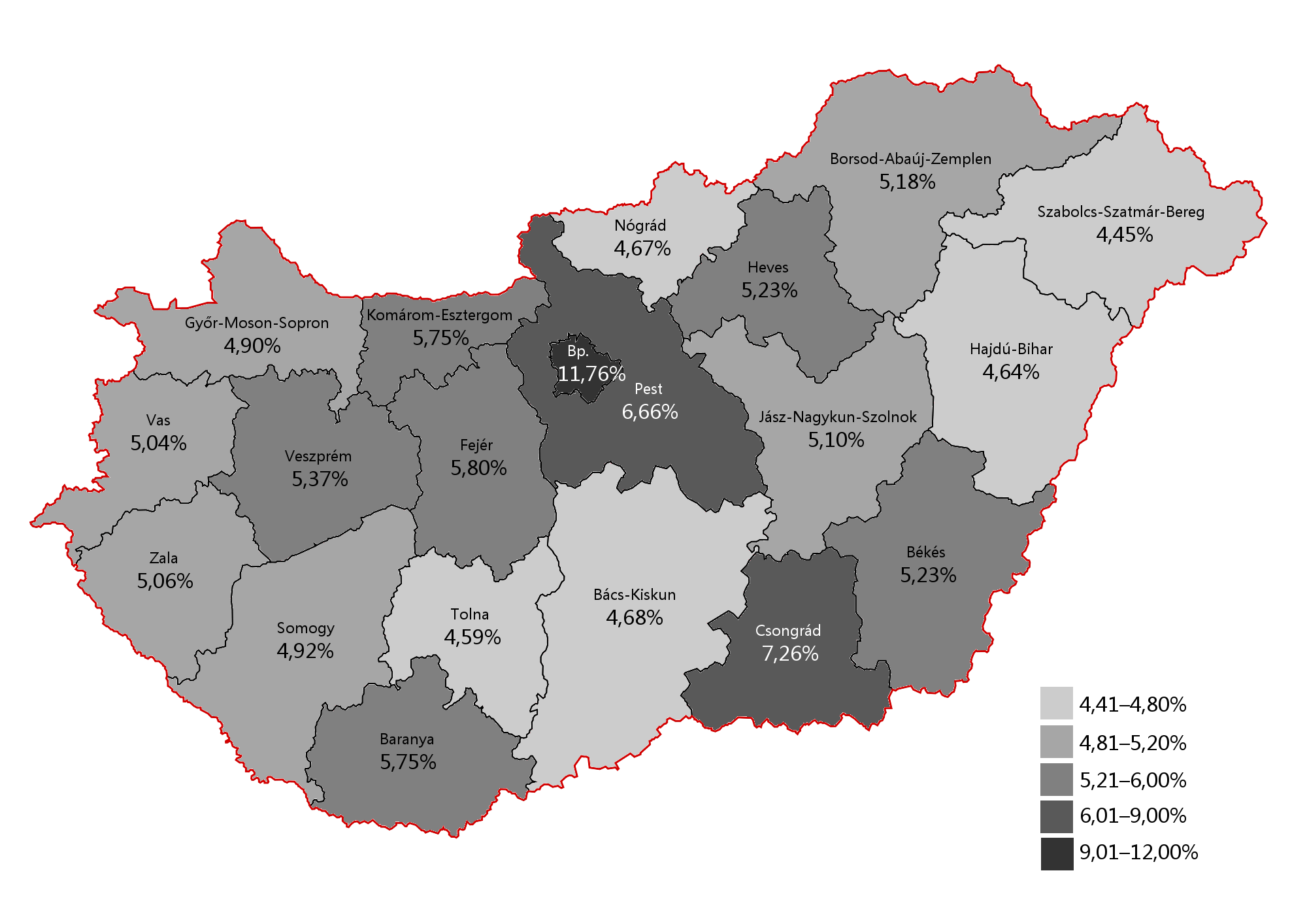
Invalid ballots as a percentage of total votes by counties and Budapest

Politics Can Be Different co-chair Bernadett Szél assessed the results as "weakening the government's position abroad". She said Orbán tried to "provoke" instead of proposals for solutions, but set up a "trap for himself". Co-chair Ákos Hadházy called the referendum as "destructive", because it "whipped up panic-like fear" among the citizens, while distracting from the "collapsing health care" and the "looting of EU funds at state level". He also said Orbán "isolated himself internationally with his populist campaign of provocation".

Leaders of the Together, Dialogue for Hungary and Modern Hungary Movement called their boycott campaign as "successful". Together party president Viktor Szigetvári referred to the quota referendum as "the most expensive and liar propaganda campaign" since the transformation into democracy in 1989. He also warned the government's methods, forecasting the possible abuses by the Fidesz during the 2018 national election. Szigetvári criticized the Liberals' campaign for "Yes" votes, who "are working from Orbán's playbook", according to him. MoMa leader Lajos Bokros claimed the boycott successfully "defended the country's honor and its international prestige". He said the referendum's only aim was "to incite hatred and divide the nation". Dialogue for Hungary spokesperson Bence Tordai claimed the "sensible and well intentioned majority of the Hungarian society had won the referendum". [...] After all the Dialogue wants to focus on a post-Orbán Hungary", he added, and called the other left-wing parties to hold a pre-selection process in the next year to choose the most suitable joint opposition candidates in each constituency.

Gábor Fodor, party president of the Hungarian Liberal Party told in the party's press conference, "Hungary is the only loser in this day", and said the "government-raised xenophobia will not disappear any time soon and without a trace". He also considered Orbán "wanted to become the undisputable leader of the Euroskeptical and populist camp within the European Union, [...] but now received a huge slap in his face".

6 percent of the votes (11 percent in Budapest) were invalid, by far the largest number in the election history of Hungary. According to most analysts, it clearly showed the Two-Tailed Dog Party's efficient and effective campaign. Thanks to the invalid result of the referendum, "we did not become such a lame country, as the government wants", MKKP leader Gergely Kovács said. He later told Népszabadság, his party decided to stand for the 2018 parliamentary election. He also insisted the Two-Tailed Dog Party does not consider itself as a joke party, because it calls attention to serious issues in a "light-hearted form and with funny arguments".

=== International ===
Luxembourgish Foreign Minister Jean Asselborn, who called for Hungary to be expelled from the European Union a month earlier, told after the publication of the preliminary result that "the Hungarians proved to be more Europeans than their government." He added "this is a bad day for Orbán, but a good day for Hungary and the European Union". He considered the invalid result as the consequence of the majority people's passive resistance. Margaritis Schinas, the Chief Spokesperson of the European Commission said "if the referendum would have been legally valid, we would have acknowledge the result. Now, the referendum proved to be invalid, we reacted by acknowledging it too." He also stressed the commission respects the democratic will of the Hungarian people, including those who stayed away from the referendum. On 7 October, European Commission President Jean-Claude Juncker told a conference in Paris that a mandatory collective decision has been accepted on the subject of quota system, and argued "If every time a member state doesn't agree with a decision, it organises a referendum to say the opposite of what the rule of law has said... we won't be able to manage and to govern the European Union". Martin Schulz, the president of the European Parliament criticized the Hungarian government's communication, which "is trying to portray [...] the invalid result as an endorsement of [Hungary's] refusal to participate in a burden-sharing scheme [the quota system]" adopted by the European Council. Schulz expressed Orbán "failed in its attempt to use opposition to the European Union for domestic political purposes" and hailed the majority Hungarian people to stay away from polling stations. "We are grateful for this", he added. Schulz also urged the Hungarian cabinet to take a constructive line in solving the problem together with the EU member states. Guy Verhofstadt said "Hungarians showed that they will not follow Orbán's populist, xenophobic and racist politics. [...] To solve the problem, fear and hate cannot be a solution, but a joint European cooperation".

Michael Roth, the German Minister of State for Europe at the Federal Foreign Office said "it's joyful that the referendum ended in failure", and called the Fidesz government's campaign as "oppressive". Niels Annen, Spokesman of Foreign Affairs of the SPD group in the Bundestag told to Die Welt that "Europe remains divided after the referendum, yet Orbán's defeat is a good news", as he could not gain majority to his migration policy both internationally and domestically. Alliance '90/The Greens politician Omid Nouripour said Orbán intended to distract attention from internal political problems with the referendum. CDU politician Gunther Krichbaum said Orbán configured the referendum as a "national fateful question" but it resulted a "political bankruptcy" for him. Jürgen Hardt said the invalid referendum "will further enhance the division and deepen the ditch in Hungary". CSU leading MEP Manfred Weber, however, told Die Welt that the result of referendum can not simply be "swept off the table", as the Hungarian voters clearly demonstrated their opposition to the EU quota system. According to FDP politician and MEP Alexander Graf Lambsdorff, the result was a "slap in the face of Orbán". He added, "Europe cannot function, if everybody "bakes their own national roast". He also noted Orbán "accepts EU funds without hesitation, while blasphemes Europe".

Commenting on the results, Austrian Foreign Minister Sebastian Kurz said the number of "No" votes is "more important" than the low turnout, and also reminded that more Hungarians rejected the migrant quota then had voted for EU membership in 2003. He underlined "It is a mistake to interpret the invalid result as Hungary wanting more immigrants. That, I believe, would be a false interpretation." He called the quota system as "totally unrealistic" and also criticized "the wrong policy" of the German Chancellor Angela Merkel and at the same time warned of a condemnation of the Hungarian government. "It is dangerous if some EU countries give the impression that they are morally superior to other member states. [...] If our top goal had not been the distribution of refugees from the outset, but the protection of the external borders, there would probably never have been this referendum in Hungary", he added in his interview to Welt am Sonntag. Harald Vilimsky, secretary of the Freedom Party of Austria (FPÖ) pointed out that the turnout was above 40 percent, while in the last European Parliament election in Hungary, it was only 29 percent. He argued "Even though the referendum is not formally valid, the Hungarians have impressed clearly against the compulsory distribution policy of immigrants in the EU. [...] "The policy of Merkel and Brussels has failed. This is also shown by the fact that quota system is not in question for further arriving immigrants". Former UK Independence Party leader Nigel Farage called the referendum result as "stunning" in his Twitter message and asked, "Are you listening Mrs. Merkel?"

According to The Guardian, the invalid result of the referendum gave "potential respite" to the migrant policy of Angela Merkel and EU bureaucrats. The British daily noted that Orbán "called for a cultural counter-revolution within the EU" but failed. BBC's Katya Adler wrote the result was both a "crushing defeat" (low turnout) and an "emphatic victory" (3 million No votes) for Orbán. John Dalhuisen (AI) told to CNN that the referendum was part of an "international PR" by Viktor Orbán. The Frankfurter Allgemeine Zeitung noted the low participation in the vote was not just related to the left-wing opposition's call to boycott. "It reflects, as a whole, an annoyance of the Hungarians over the games of the politicians whether they are sitting in the government or not", as FAZ argued. Politico wrote the referendum showed that Hungary "stands behind" Orbán in his migration policy. According to the article the invalid turnout was irrelevant in political sense: with 98% No vote, Orbán "seeks to claim a larger European role and to present himself as a counterweight to the traditional power brokers in Berlin, Paris and London". Analyst Milan Nič told Orbán "wants to be a prophet of [...] post-liberal, post-factual Europe, built around the backlash against globalization and liberalism [...]".

== See also ==
- European migrant crisis
- Timeline of the European migrant crisis
