= Third Orbán government =

Government of Hungary between 2014 and 2018

- 71st Cabinet of Hungary
- Incumbent
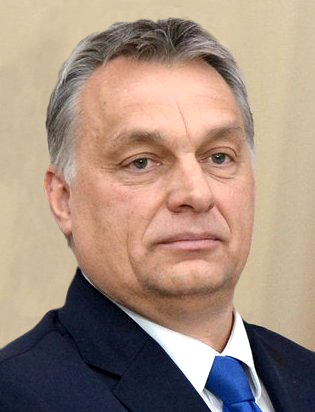
- Date formed: 6 June 2014
- Date dissolved: 18 May 2018

People and organisations
- Head of state: János Áder
- Head of government: Viktor Orbán
- Head of government's history: 1998–2002, 2010–2026
- Deputy head of government: Zsolt Semjén
- Member party: Fidesz; KDNP
- Status in legislature: Supermajority (until 22 February 2015); Majority (from 22 February 2015)
- Opposition party: MSZP; Jobbik; LMP
- Opposition leader: Parliamentary: László Botka (MSZP) (2014, acting); József Tóbiás (MSZP) (2014–2016); Gyula Molnár (MSZP) (2016–2018); Extra-parliamentary, most popular: Gábor Vona (Jobbik) (2014–2018)

History
- Election: 2014 election
- Outgoing election: 2018 election
- Legislature terms: 2014–2018
- Predecessor: Orbán II
- Successor: Orbán IV

The third government of Viktor Orbán was the government of Hungary between 6 June 2014 and 18 May 2018. Prime Minister Viktor Orbán formed his third cabinet after his party-alliance, Fidesz and its coalition partner, Christian Democratic People's Party (KDNP) altogether won a qualified majority in the 2014 parliamentary election.

== Policy ==
=== Immigration ===
During the 2015 European migrant crisis the government initiated the erection of the Hungary-Serbia barrier to block entry of illegal immigrants. Just like the other Visegrád Group leaders, the government was against any compulsory EU long-term quota on redistribution of migrants.

On 24 February 2016 the prime minister announced that the government would hold a Referendum on whether to accept the European Union's proposed mandatory quotas for relocating migrants. He also said it is "no secret that the Hungarian government refuses migrant quotas" and that they will be campaigning for "no" votes. Orbán argued that the quota system would "redraw Hungary's and Europe's ethnic, cultural and religious identity, which no EU organ has the right to do". On 5 May, after examining the legal challenges, the Supreme Court (Kúria) allowed the holding of the referendum.

In the autumn of that year the no vote won with 3,362,224 votes or 98.36% of the total number of votes.

=== Free Sunday ===
Fidesz and the Christian Democratic People's Party (Hungary) has supported the restriction on Sunday shopping ("free Sunday", as they called) for a long time, citing Christian values. Parliament voted on the issue on December 14, 2014 and the law came into effect on March 15, 2015 (a Sunday on which shops would have been closed anyway, the day being a public holiday in Hungary). Public opinion was predominantly against the decision. Three polls done in the spring of 2015 registered an opposition of 64% (Szonda Ipsos), 62% (Medián) 59% (Tárki). By the end of May, according to a poll by Medián, 72% of those polled disliked the new law, even the majority of Fidesz-KDNP voters were against it. Opposition parties and private persons tried to start a public referendum several times. By November 2015 there were 16 such attempts, but none of them were approved, for various bureaucratic reasons, until in early 2016 one of these attempts, initiated by the Hungarian Socialist Party, was finally successful. The government, rather than being forced to hold the referendum (which could have been interpreted as a huge success for the opposition party, even though the law was opposed by the majority of Fidesz voters too) lifted the ban in April 2016.

=== NGO restriction ===
On 13 June 2017, The Hungarian parliament passed a law targeting foreign-funded NGOs. The law requires civil groups receiving foreign donations above a certain threshold to register as organizations funded from abroad. The law was passed 130 to 44, with 25 abstaining.

== Party breakdown ==
=== Beginning of term ===
Party breakdown of cabinet ministers in the beginning of term:

- Fidesz
7
- KDNP
2
- Independents
2

=== End of term ===
Party breakdown of cabinet ministers in the end of term:

- Fidesz
8
- KDNP
3
- Independents
3

== Vote in parliament ==
Election of the Prime Minister; Viktor Orbán (Fidesz)
Ballot →	10 May 2014
Required majority →	100 out of 199
Yes: • Fidesz (114); • KDNP (16)	130 / 199
No: • MSZP (26); • Jobbik (21); • LMP (5); • Independent (5)	57 / 199
Abstain	0 / 199
Not voting: • MSZP (3); • Fidesz (3); • Jobbik (2); • Independent (4)	12 / 199

== Members of the Cabinet ==
Office	Name	Party	Term
Prime Minister's Office
Prime Minister	Viktor Orbán	Fidesz	2014–2018
Minister of the Prime Minister’s Office	János Lázár	Fidesz	2014–2018
Minister of the Prime Minister’s Cabinet Office	Antal Rogán	Fidesz	2015–2018
Deputy Prime Minister
Deputy Prime Minister	Zsolt Semjén	KDNP	2014–2018
Ministers
Minister of Foreign Affairs and Trade	Tibor Navracsics	Fidesz	2014
Minister of Foreign Affairs and Trade	Péter Szijjártó	Fidesz	2014–2018
Minister of Interior	Sándor Pintér	Independent	2014–2018
Minister of Justice	László Trócsányi	Independent	2014–2018
Minister of National Economy	Mihály Varga	Fidesz	2014–2018
Minister of Human Resources	Zoltán Balog	Fidesz	2014–2018
Minister of National Development	Miklós Seszták	KDNP	2014–2018
Minister of Agriculture	Sándor Fazekas	Fidesz	2014–2018
Minister of Defence	Csaba Hende	Fidesz	2014–2015
Minister of Defence	István Simicskó	KDNP	2015–2018
Ministers without portfolio
Minister for National Politics	Zsolt Semjén	KDNP	2014–2018
Minister for Responsible for the Planning, Construction and Commissioning of the two new blocks at Paks Nuclear Power Plant	János Süli	Independent	2017–2018
Minister for Responsible for the Development of Cities with County Rights	Lajos Kósa	Fidesz	2017–2018

== Composition ==
Following the 2014 parliamentary election, Fidesz–KDNP gained 133 seats in the National Assembly. The government majority of the parliament elected Viktor Orbán as a fully-fledged prime minister on 10 May, but his third cabinet formed only 6 June.

The Ministry of Foreign Affairs transformed into the Ministry of Foreign Affairs and Trade, while the Ministry of Rural Development and the Ministry of Public Administration and Justice were renamed to Ministry of Agriculture and Ministry of Justice, respectively. On 17 October 2015, the Ministry of the Prime Minister's Cabinet Office was established. Two ministers without portfolio were appointed in May 2017 and October 2017.

Office	Image	Incumbent	Political party	In office
Prime Minister		Viktor Orbán	Fidesz	10 May 2014 – 10 May 2018
Deputy Prime Minister; Minister without portfolio for National Politics		Zsolt Semjén	KDNP	6 June 2014 – 18 May 2018
Minister of the Prime Minister's Office		János Lázár	Fidesz	6 June 2014 – 18 May 2018
Minister of the Prime Minister's Cabinet Office		Antal Rogán	Fidesz	17 October 2015 – 18 May 2018
Minister of Foreign Affairs and Trade		Tibor Navracsics	Fidesz	6 June 2014 – 13 September 2014
Minister of Foreign Affairs and Trade		Péter Szijjártó	Fidesz	23 September 2014 – 18 May 2018
Minister of Interior		Sándor Pintér	Independent	6 June 2014 – 18 May 2018
Minister of Justice		László Trócsányi	Independent	6 June 2014 – 18 May 2018
Minister of National Economy		Mihály Varga	Fidesz	6 June 2014 – 18 May 2018
Minister of Human Resources		Zoltán Balog	Fidesz	6 June 2014 – 18 May 2018
Minister of National Development		Miklós Seszták	KDNP	6 June 2014 – 18 May 2018
Minister of Agriculture		Sándor Fazekas	Fidesz	6 June 2014 – 18 May 2018
Minister of Defence		Csaba Hende	Fidesz	6 June 2014 – 9 September 2015
Minister of Defence		István Simicskó	KDNP	10 September 2015 – 18 May 2018
Minister without Portfolio responsible for the planning, construction and commissioning of the two new units at Paks Nuclear Power Plant		János Süli	Independent	2 May 2017 – 18 May 2018
Minister without Portfolio responsible for the development of towns with county rights		Lajos Kósa	Fidesz	2 October 2017 – 18 May 2018
