= Botka =

Botka is a Hungarian surname that may refer to the following notable people:

- Endre Botka (born 1994), Hungarian football player
- László Botka (born 1973), Hungarian politician
