= Attila Mesterházy =

Hungarian politician

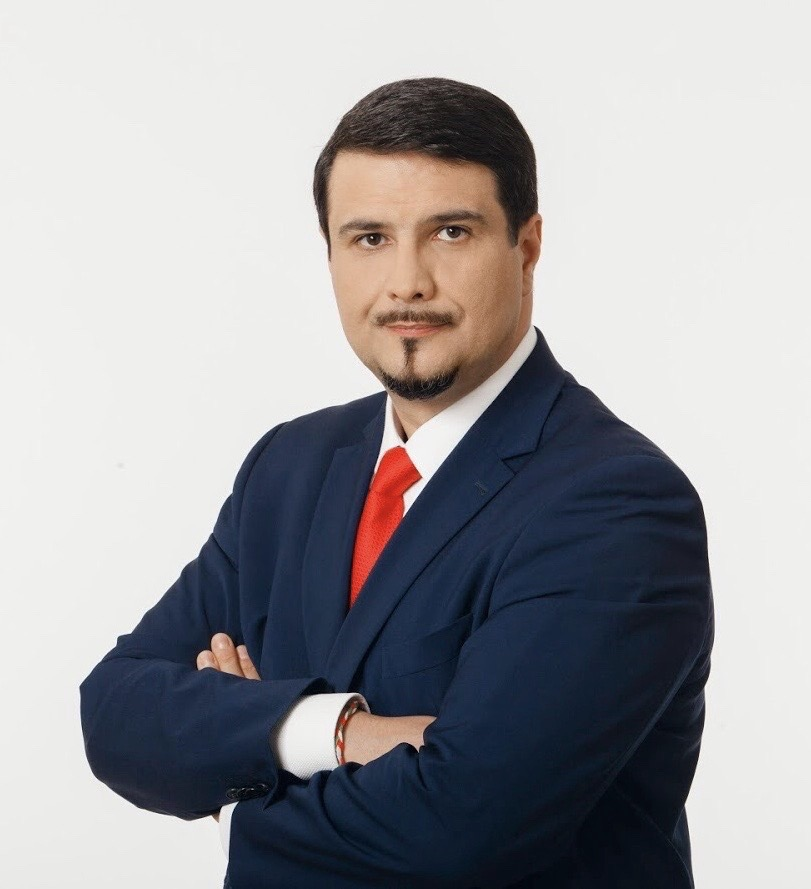
- Mesterházy in 2024

President of the NATO Parliamentary Assembly
- In office 16 December 2019 – 23 November 2020
- Preceded by: Madeleine Moon
- Succeeded by: Gerry Connolly

Chairman of the Hungarian Socialist Party
- In office 10 July 2010 – 29 May 2014
- Preceded by: Ildikó Lendvai
- Succeeded by: László Botka (Acting)

President of Socialists and Democrats
- Incumbent
- Assumed office 2023
- Preceded by: Position established

Personal details
- Born: 30 January 1974 (age 52) Pécs, Hungary
- Party: MSZP (2000–2023); Socialists and Democrats (2023–present)
- Children: 2
- Education: Corvinus University; Semmelweis University

Attila Mesterházy (born 30 January 1974) is a Hungarian politician, who served as the seventh chairman of the Hungarian Socialist Party (MSZP) from 10 July 2010 to 29 May 2014, and as Vice-President of Socialist International from 2010 to 2022. He was a Member of Parliament between 2004 and 2022. He was the party's candidate for the position of Prime Minister of Hungary in the 2010 and 2014 parliamentary elections. He was elected President of the NATO Parliamentary Assembly in December 2019, becoming the first Eastern European to hold the position, and served until the end of 2020. He founded a new party, Socialists and Democrats, in 2023 together with former colleagues, aiming to revitalise the Hungarian centre-left with a more modern, pro-European platform.

== Early life ==
Attila Mesterházy was born on 30 January 1974 in Pécs and grew up in Veszprém as an only child. His father, also Dr. Attila Mesterházy, is a physician who served as chief medical officer at the Veszprém County Hospital and later as a regional screening coordinator for the National Public Health and Medical Officer Service. His mother, Éva Temesi, is an economist who worked as deputy director of the Veszprém Distillery Company and later as a department head at Veszprémi Komfort Rt.

== Education ==
He completed his primary and secondary schooling in Veszprém and graduated from Lovassy László Gimnázium in 1992. He then studied at the Budapest University of Economic Sciences (now Corvinus University of Budapest), earning a degree in international relations with honours in 1997, with additional specialisations in European Studies. In 1995 he passed the state examination in economics with distinction.

Mesterházy began doctoral studies in the university’s International Relations Doctoral Programme in 1997, focusing on EU regional and cohesion policy, and completed his comprehensive doctoral examination summa cum laude in 1999, although he did not finish his dissertation, entering full-time politics instead.

During his university years he received several international scholarships. He studied at the University of Valladolid in Spain (1995–1996), attended the Vienna Diplomatic Academy in 1996, completed a programme at the University of Groningen in 1997, and participated in a seminar at the European Academy in Berlin in 1998. In 2005 he visited the United States as a recipient of the U.S. State Department’s Young Leaders Programme.

== Political career ==
=== Early political and governmental roles (1997–2010) ===
Mesterházy began his political career in 1997–1998 in the Office of Prime Minister Gyula Horn, where he worked as a departmental head preparing economic and European integration analyses. During this period, he also taught world economy at the Budapest University of Economic Sciences, becoming an assistant lecturer in 1999, and served as an examiner in international political relations and European integration at the College of Foreign Trade.

Between 1999 and 2001 he worked as project director at Hill & Knowlton, after which he became an independent communications consultant, including advisory work for the parliamentary group of the Hungarian Socialist Party (MSZP). In 2001 he joined the “tízek társasága,” the ten-member advisory circle supporting Péter Medgyessy’s successful campaign for prime minister. He joined MSZP’s Veszprém County organisation in 2003 and later became vice-chair of the regional association, entering the party’s national leadership that same year. He was elected vice-president of MSZP in 2009 with the highest share of votes among candidates.

In 2002 he ran as an MSZP candidate in the national election and was appointed Political State Secretary in the Ministry of Children, Youth and Sports, a role he held until 2004. He entered the National Assembly later that year following the resignation of MEP Katalin Szili. From 2004 to 2006 he served as Political State Secretary in the Ministry of Youth, Family, Social Affairs and Equal Opportunities under Prime Minister Ferenc Gyurcsány, addressing youth, minority, sport and consumer-protection policy areas.

As an MP, he held roles in the Foreign Affairs Committee, the Committee on Hungarian Communities Abroad, the Consumer Protection Committee, and the ad hoc committee overseeing the Nabucco gas pipeline project, where he later served as co-chair. In 2008 he was elected rapporteur of the NATO Parliamentary Assembly’s (NATO PA) Economic and Security Committee and co-chair of the Hungarian Parliament’s EU Presidency Working Group.

=== Leader of the Hungarian Socialist Party (MSZP) 2010–2014 ===
Mesterházy was elected the Hungarian Socialist Party’s parliamentary group leader in April 2009 and was chosen as MSZP’s candidate for prime minister with 90% of delegate votes in December 2009. He became party chairman on 10 July 2010.

He assumed the leadership at a low point for MSZP, following heavy electoral defeat and internal fragmentation. Under his chairmanship, party support doubled by early 2012, placing MSZP within ten percentage points of the governing Fidesz and restoring its position as Hungary’s main opposition force. He kept the party united during the split led by former prime minister Ferenc Gyurcsány, preventing the breakaway group from forming a parliamentary faction.

Mesterházy initiated the party’s new strategic programme, Offer for Hungary (2012), reorganised the party leadership, and played a central role in negotiations to form a broad opposition alliance ahead of the 2014 elections. In January 2014 he was elected as the opposition’s (Unity) joint prime ministerial candidate, defeating former prime minister Gordon Bajnai at the primaries and being confirmed at a 13,000-strong rally.

Following the opposition’s defeat in 2014 and MSZP’s 10% result in the European Parliament election, he resigned as party chairman and parliamentary group leader, taking full responsibility. He subsequently withdrew from public political activity for a year.

=== Parliamentary and party roles after the MSZP chairmanship (2014–2022) ===
After stepping down as party leader, Mesterházy remained active in parliamentary work, returning to the Foreign Affairs Committee and the Parliamentary Assembly of the Council of Europe. Between 2014 and 2016 he submitted 1,591 motions—one of the highest figures in the National Assembly—and spoke 81 times in plenary sessions, including 19 times as lead speaker.

In 2016 he was elected chair of the Budget Committee, a post he held until 2018. He was re-elected to parliament from the joint MSZP–Párbeszéd list in the 2018 election and again became a member of the Budget Committee and vice-chair of the Foreign Affairs Committee. In the 2018–2022 term he was one of the parliament’s most active legislators, submitting 2,222 motions, co-signing 33 bills and 41 resolutions, and delivering more than 300 speeches, including 58 as lead speaker.

Mesterházy was twice involved in MSZP leadership contests after 2014: he ran for party chairman in 2018, losing narrowly to Bertalan Tóth, and briefly considered a second leadership bid in 2020 before withdrawing due to internal disputes surrounding the party congress.

In 2021 he ran in the opposition primary in the Veszprém 1st constituency but was defeated by the Democratic Coalition candidate. Later that year he announced he would not seek a place on the national list in the 2022 election, ending twenty years of continuous parliamentary service.

=== International roles ===
Alongside his domestic political work, Mesterházy played an increasingly prominent role in international social democratic and parliamentary diplomacy. He served as Vice-President of the Socialist International from 2010 to 2022 and was re-elected in 2017.

Within the NATO Parliamentary Assembly he held multiple senior positions. He served as rapporteur of the Economic and Security Committee, later becoming leader of the Socialist Group and chair of the Subcommittee on Transatlantic Defence and Security Cooperation. In October 2019 he was elected Vice-President of the NATO PA, and on 16 December 2019 he was elected President of the Assembly—becoming the first Hungarian and the first Eastern European to hold the position. After completing his term at the end of 2020, he was again elected Vice-President.

=== Founding of Socialists and Democrats (2023–present) ===
In April 2023, after leaving MSZP, Mesterházy founded a new political party, Socialists and Democrats (Szoc-Dem), together with several former Socialist MPs, with the aim of renewing the Hungarian democratic left.

== Personal life ==
Mesterházy is married and has two children. He speaks English and Spanish fluently. In his free time, he enjoys riding motorbikes and playing football.

National Assembly of Hungary
Preceded by Ildikó Lendvai	Leader of the MSZP parliamentary group 2009–2014	Succeeded by József Tóbiás
Party political offices
Preceded by Ildikó Lendvai	Chairman of the Hungarian Socialist Party; 2010–2014	Succeeded by László Botka; Acting
