= József Tóbiás =

Hungarian politician

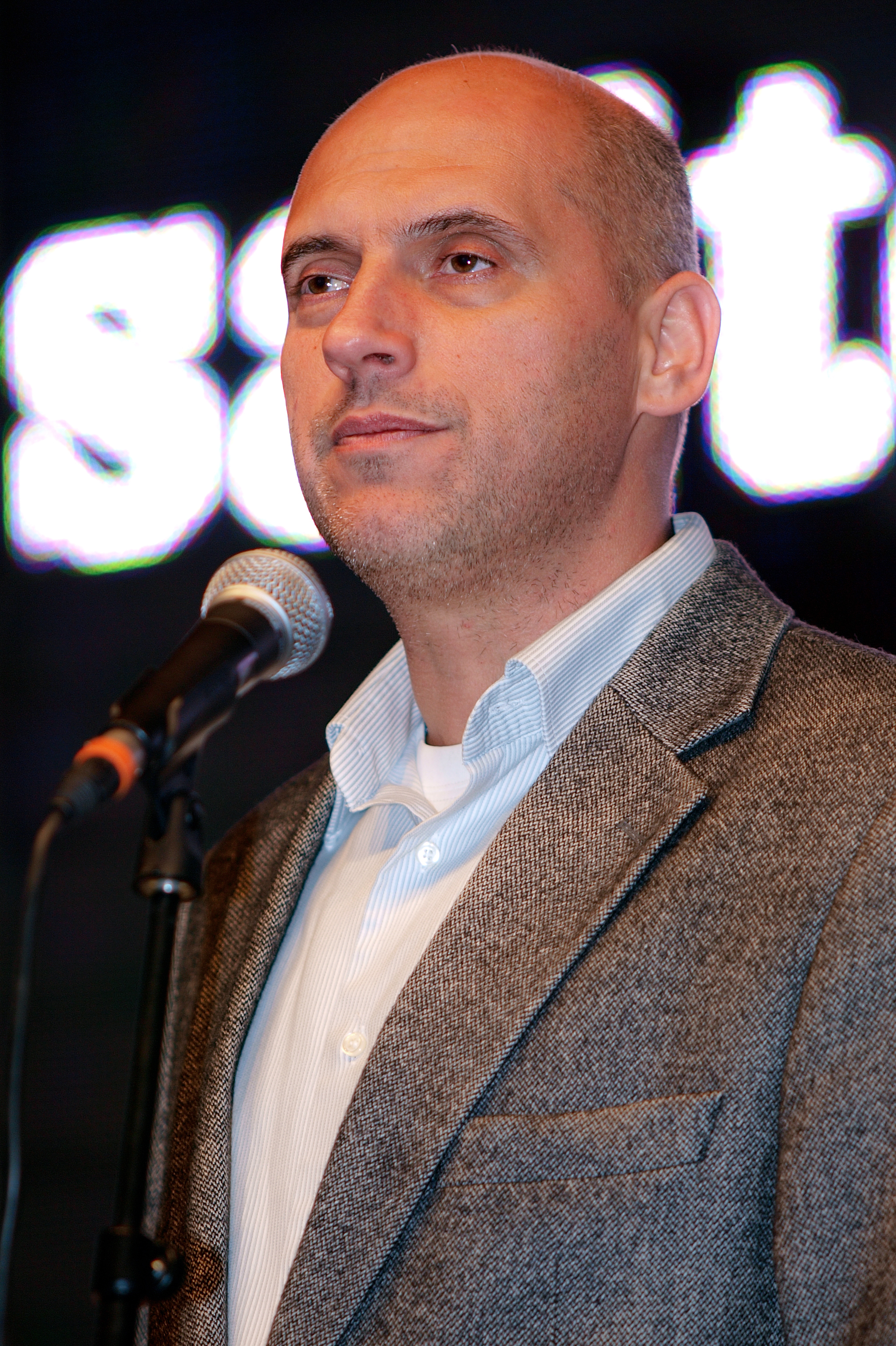
- Tóbiás in 2011

Chairman of the Hungarian Socialist Party
- In office 19 July 2014 – 25 June 2016
- Preceded by: Attila Mesterházy
- Succeeded by: Gyula Molnár

Personal details
- Born: 15 July 1970 (age 56) Kisvárda, Hungary
- Party: MSZP (since 1999)
- Spouse: Tímea Rába
- Children: Márk; Nina; Noel

József Tóbiás (born 15 July 1970) is a Hungarian politician, who served as the leader of the Hungarian Socialist Party (MSZP) from 19 July 2014 to 25 June 2016. He was also a Member of Parliament from 1998 to 2019.

== Career ==
Tóbiás was born in Kisvárda on 15 July 1970. He finished his elementary studies in Dombrád. He took his secondary school leaving examination at the Vásárhelyi Pál Construction and Water Technical School of Nyíregyháza in 1988. Following that he started to work for the local water engineering management. From 1991, he worked for the Dunapack packaging company.

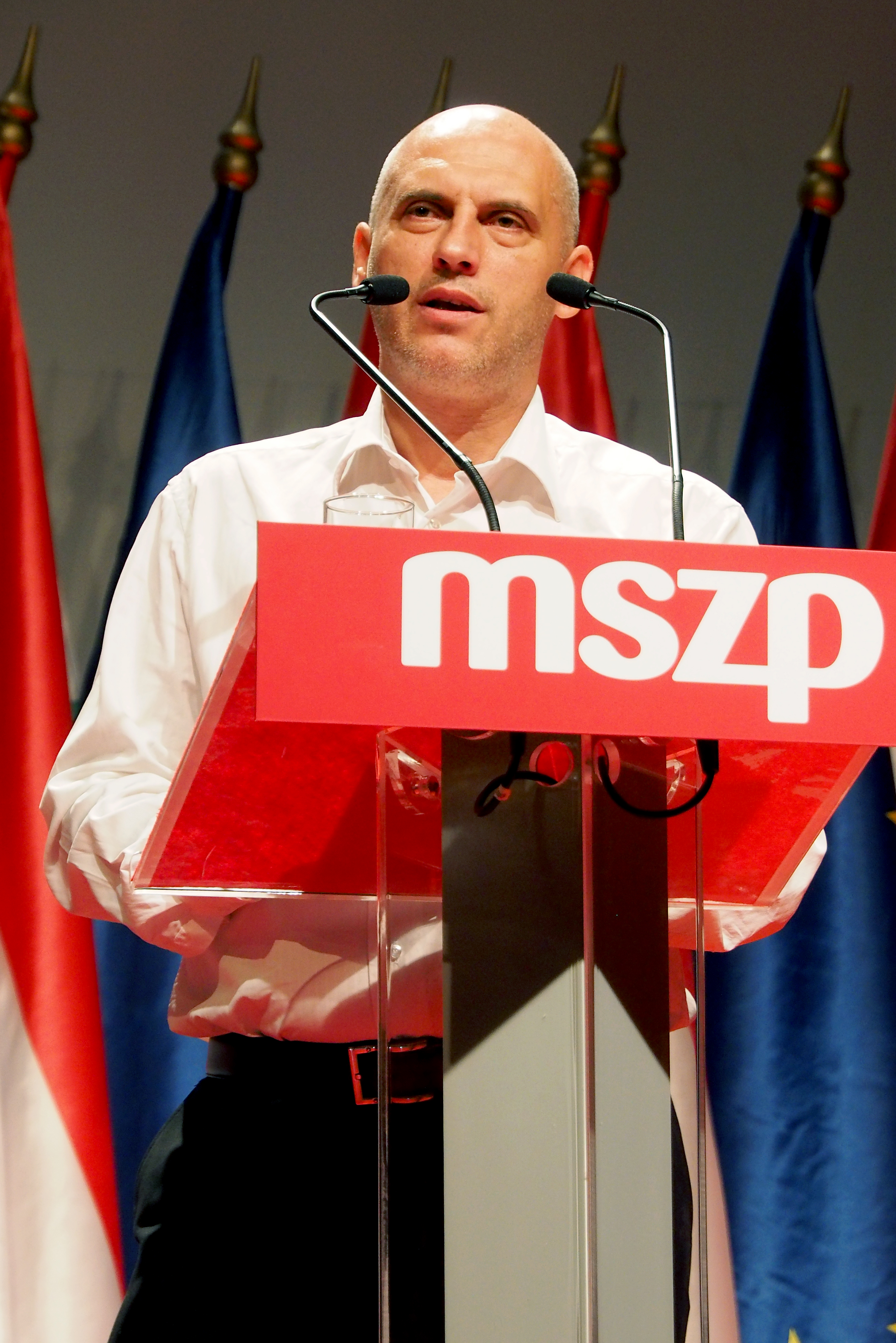
Tóbiás as newly elected leader of the MSZP

He became involved in politics as a member of the Left Youth Association (BIT) which had a close relationship with the Hungarian Socialist Party (MSZP). In 1992, he was elected to the presidium of the organization. He served as vice president since 1995, then as president of the BIT since 1997. In this capacity he participated in the 1998 parliamentary election, when his name was added to the MSZP's national list. Tóbiás secured a parliamentary seat and became a member of the Youth and Sports Committee and the Committee on Social Organizations. He joined the party itself in the next year.

In 1999, the BIT was reorganized and transformed into Young Left (FIB). Tóbiás was elected leader of the new organization, which became the official youth wing of the Socialist Party. He held the office until 2002, meanwhile he was elected to the presidium of the MSZP in 2000. He secured a mandate again from the party's national list in the 2002 parliamentary election. In the same year, he was appointed party director of the MSZP. He graduated from Faculty of Adult Education and Human Resources of the University of Pécs in 2005, earning a degree of human resources business. He became MP from his party's Pest County Regional List in the 2006 parliamentary election. He was appointed deputy leader of the MSZP parliamentary group in 2008. Following the 2010 parliamentary election, he became a close associate and supporter of party chairman Attila Mesterházy.

Tóbiás was elected leader of the Hungarian Socialist Party on 19 July 2014 following the resignation of Mesterházy after the disastrous 2014 parliamentary and European Parliament elections. He also became leader of the parliamentary group in September 2014. During his leadership, the Socialist Party won a parliamentary by-election (2014) and an important mayoral by-election (Salgótarján), however the party itself was permanently pushed back to the third place by far-right Jobbik according to the opinion polls. Tóbiás did not support the full cooperation and unification of the left-wing opposition parties against Viktor Orbán's Fidesz. During the MSZP party congress in June 2016, he was defeated by Gyula Molnár, a former Socialist MP and mayor, who succeeded him as party chairman. In June 2017, Tóbiás was appointed campaign director of the then Prime Minister-candidate László Botka for the 2018 parliamentary election. Tóbiás obtained a parliamentary seat via the MSZP–Dialogue for Hungary electoral list in 2018. He was a member of the Legislative Committee from 2014 to 2019 and the Welfare Committee from 2016 to 2018. Tóbiás resigned from his parliamentary seat due to family issues in October 2019.

== Personal life ==
Tóbiás married former model, beauty queen and actress Tímea Rába. They have two children, Nina (born 2003) and Noel (born 2008). Tímea Rába also has a son from her previous marriage: Márk (born 1994). They lived in Érd since 2003. Tóbiás and his family moved to Tenerife, Canary Islands in the autumn of 2018.

National Assembly of Hungary
Preceded by Attila Mesterházy	Leader of the MSZP parliamentary group 2014–2016	Succeeded by Bertalan Tóth
Party political offices
Preceded by László Botka; Acting	Chairman of the Hungarian Socialist Party; 2014–2016	Succeeded by Gyula Molnár
