= Róbert Répássy =

Hungarian lawyer and politician

Member of the National Assembly
- In office 18 June 1998 – 7 May 2018
- In office 22 December 1993 – 27 June 1994

Personal details
- Born: 18 May 1968 (age 57) Miskolc, Hungary
- Party: Fidesz (since 1988)
- Spouse: Dr Éva Répássyné Kónya
- Children: András; Mihály
- Profession: lawyer, politician

Róbert Répássy (born 18 May 1968) is a Hungarian lawyer and politician who has been the Secretary of State for Ministry of Public Administration and Justice (since 2014 Ministry of Justice) from 2 June 2010 to 8 October 2015 and since 11 December 2021. He became a member of the National Assembly (MP) in the 1998 parliamentary election. He was also MP between 1993 and 1994, as the youngest sitting parliamentarian.

== Personal life ==
He is married to Éva Répássyné Kónya. They have two sons, András and Mihály.

Honorary titles
Preceded by Béla Glattfelder	Youngest sitting Member of Parliament; 1993–1994	Succeeded by László Botka
