= Győrújfalu =

- Coat of arms

- Location of Győr-Moson-Sopron county in Hungary

- Location of Győrújfalu
- Coordinates: 47.72236°N 17.60836°E
- Country: Hungary
- County: Győr-Moson-Sopron

Area
  - Total: 7.37 km^{2} (2.85 sq mi)

Population (2004)
  - Total: 1,211
  - Density: 164.31/km^{2} (425.6/sq mi)
- Time zone: UTC+1 (CET)
  - Summer (DST): UTC+2 (CEST)
- Postal code: 9171
- Area code: 96

Győrújfalu is a village in Győr-Moson-Sopron county, Hungary.
