= Csaba Böjte =

Romanian friar and writer

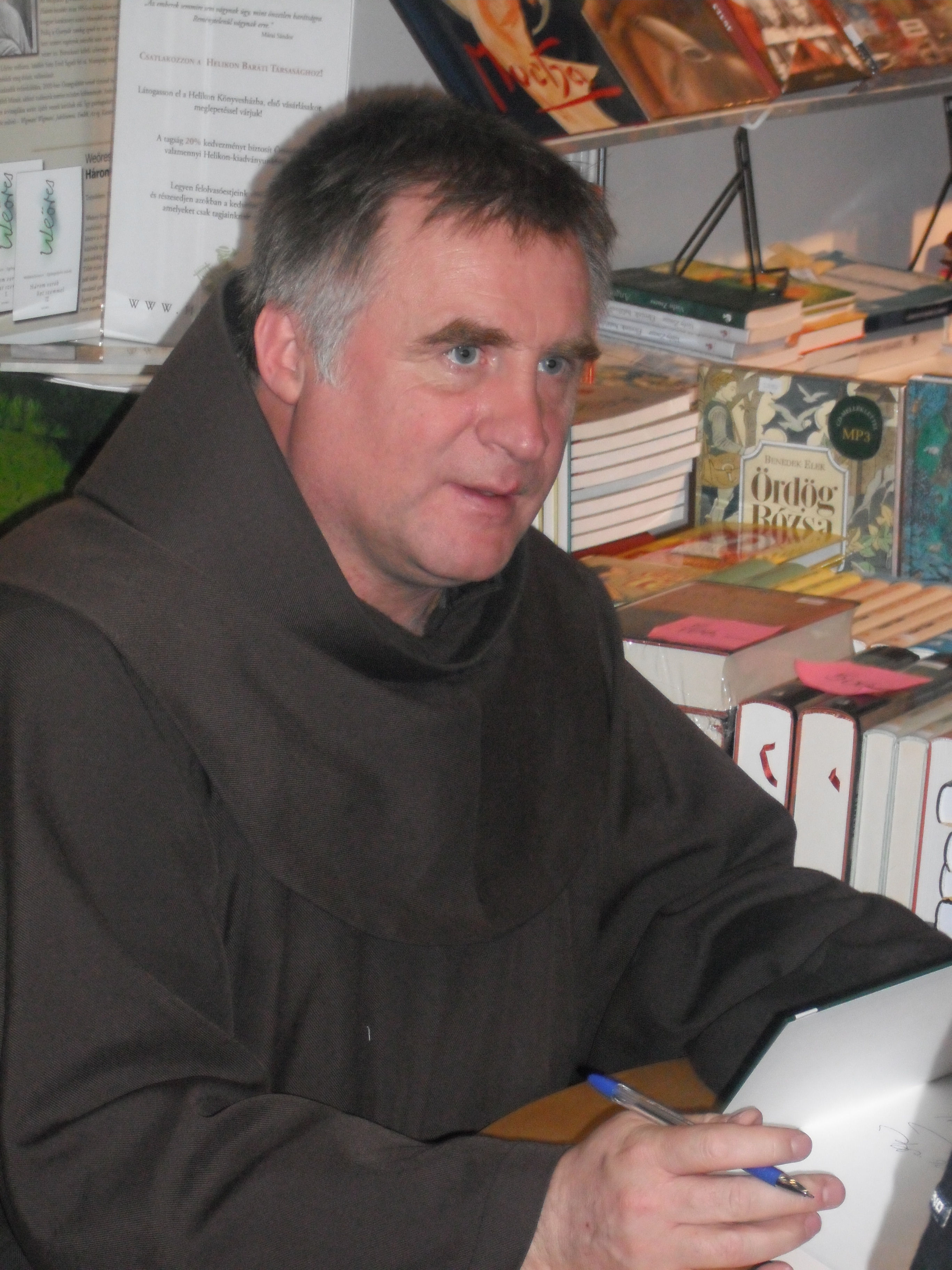
- Csaba Böjte in 2010
- Born: 24 January 1959 (age 67); Cluj, Romania
- Occupations: Franciscan friar, founder and director of the Saint Francis Foundation of Deva

Csaba Böjte (Hungarian: Böjte Csaba; [ˈbøjtɛ ˈt͡ʃɒbɒ] born 24 January 1959) is an ethnic Hungarian Franciscan friar, author, humanitarian, and director and founder of the Saint Francis Foundation of Deva, Romania. His foundation works to rescue homeless orphans in Transylvania.

The foundation provides food, housing, and education to children living in poor conditions, a large number of whom suffer from extreme poverty and chronic food insecurity. There are currently over 2500 children living in the Saint Francis Foundation's homes and shelters, and hundreds more are a part of the organization's live-in care system.

== Biography ==
Böjte Csaba was born into an ethnic Hungarian family in Cluj (today Cluj-Napoca), Romania, a city in Transylvania with a large Hungarian-speaking population. Böjte trained to be a car mechanic, but then decided to become a miner in the remote Harghita Mountains for a year. He made this abrupt change in career in order to test his abilities in preparation for becoming a priest.

Böjte's father was a poet and lived in Transylvania during the Ceaușescu communist dictatorship, under which he was sentenced to serve seven years in prison due to the contents of one of his poems. After serving four and a half years, Böjte's father escaped the prison where he had been tortured, and he died less than two years after his escape due to the injuries he sustained. His father's death was a turning point in Böjte's life, and it was then he decided to become a priest.

Böjte joined the Franciscan Order in 1982, under the Ceaușescu dictatorship, and his induction took place in secrecy. He completed his priestly studies in Alba Iulia and Esztergom, and was ordained in 1989.

Working as a priest in different places across Transylvania, Father Böjte settled in Deva, where he took several homeless orphans off the streets, and under his protection. Father Böjte broke the lock off of an abandoned Franciscan monastery, which had not been used in decades, and moved the homeless children in. Romanian authorities opposed this, repeatedly ordering Father Böjte to leave the monastery, under the pretense of trespassing. Father Böjte responded that the Romanian police would have to physically remove the children if they wanted them to leave the premises, which they did not do.

Word of Father Böjte's makeshift orphanage spread across Deva, and later the rest of Transylvania and Hungary as well. Besides providing the orphans with the basic necessities of life, Böjte also provided education for the orphans, which included religious and moral instruction. Many of the orphans under Father Böjte's protection went on to attend university.

Since opening the first orphanage in 1993, Father Böjte has helped house, feed, and educate over 6,000 orphans through the Saint Francis Foundation, with over 2500 children currently under the Foundation's care.

Böjte has published numerous books, articles, and essays. Alongside his duties with the Saint Francis Foundation, he continues to celebrate masses, and speak at various engagements worldwide.

== Orphanages ==
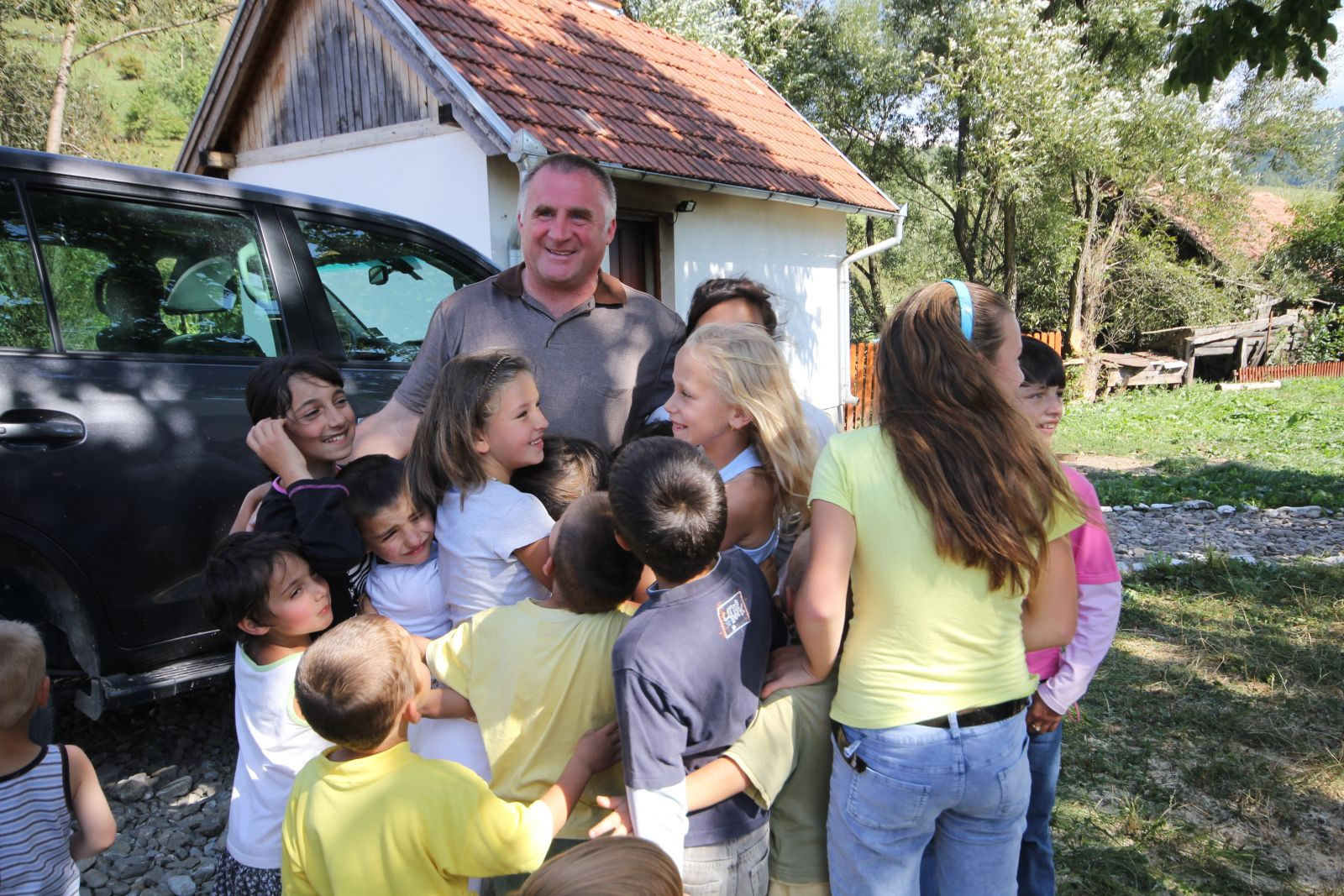
Böjte Csaba with orphans in Gyimesközéplok, 2011

Following the illegal occupation of the abandoned monastery which was transformed into a makeshift orphanage, Father Böjte and his orphans renovated the building room by room. They also built their own kindergarten, primary school, and administration building. Father Böjte and the Saint Francis Foundation purchased two apartment buildings near the monastery, using them to house orphans in foster families, generally allocating 8-10 children to a foster parent. These family groupings consist of children of different ages, so the older children can take on extra responsibilities in the home, and help look after the younger children. Many of the rescued children go on to learn trades and attend university, while others stay behind helping raise children in the orphanage. The number of children in Saint Francis Foundation orphanages continues to grow, as more and more children are being brought under its care from increasingly remote and rural regions of Transylvania.

Saint Francis Foundation orphanages have now been established in cities, towns, and villages all across Transylvania. The majority of the Foundation's budget comes from donations, which is often used to purchase land and real estate to found new orphanages in order to deal with the increasing number of children under the Foundation's care. The Foundation operates with the support of volunteers, who help care for the children, as well as cook, clean, and build. The Saint Francis Foundation is not funded or supported by the Government of Romania. However, in 2005, the Government of Hungary provided the foundation with significant funding, and it donated 15 million HUF for the construction of a sports field for the orphanage in Sovata.

On 30 June 2022 the Miercurea Ciuc Court handed down a sentence of 30 years in prison for rape and sexual assault for an employee of a children's center in Băile Tușnad (patronized by the foundation of Csaba Böjte), on facts that extend to several years (2007-2017).

== Books ==
- Böjte Csaba: Hiszek a szeretet végső győzelmében! Budapest: Szent Gellért Kiadó, 2005
- Böjte Csaba: Kevesebb pátoszt és több áldozatot! Budapest: Szent Gellért Kiadó, 2006
- A fénygyújtogató. Böjte Csaba atyával beszélget Benkei Ildikó. Budapest: Kairosz, 2006
- Istennel a semmiből a végtelen felé. Böjte Csabával beszélget Csengei Ágota. Budapest: Kairosz, 2006
- Asztali beszélgetések...2 – A csendesség felé. Böjte Csaba és Roszík Ágnes disputája. szerk: Galambos Ádám, Budapest; Luther Kiadó, 2008
- Böjte Csaba, Karikó Éva: Ablak a végtelenre – Csaba testvér gondolatai Istenről, vallásról, életről, emberről... Budapest: Helikon Kiadó, 2009
- Böjte Csaba, Karikó Éva: Ablak a végtelenre – Csaba testvér gondolatai Istenről, vallásról, életről, emberről... Budapest: Helikon Kiadó, Budapest, 2016, új, javított kiadás
- Böjte Csaba, Karikó Éva: Út a végtelenbe - Csaba testvér gondolatai Isten ajándékairól Helikon kiadó, Budapest, 2010
- Böjte Csaba, Karikó Éva: Út a végtelenbe – Csaba testvér gondolatai Isten ajándékairól Helikon kiadó, Budapest, 2016, új, javított kiadás
- Böjte Csaba, Karikó Éva: Iránytű a végtelenhez – Csaba testvér gondolatai az isteni parancsolatokról Helikon kiadó, Budapest, 2011
- Böjte Csaba, Karikó Éva: Iránytű a végtelenhez - Csaba testvér gondolatai az isteni parancsolatokról Helikon kiadó, Budapest, 2016, új, javított kiadás
- Böjte Csaba, Karikó Éva: Párbeszéd a végtelennel – Csaba testvér gondolatai az Istennel való mély és bensőséges kapcsolatról Helikon kiadó, Budapest, 2012
- Böjte Csaba, Karikó Éva: Párbeszéd a végtelennel – Csaba testvér gondolatai az Istennel való mély és bensőséges kapcsolatról Helikon kiadó, Budapest, 2016, új, javított kiadás
- Böjte Csaba: A szeretet bölcsője. összeállította: Karikó Éva, fotók: Váradi Levente, Helikon kiadó, Budapest, 2012
- Böjte Csaba: A mindennapi kenyérnél is fontosabb a remény, füves könyv az anyagiakról, a válságról, a szolidaritásról és a jövőről, összeállította: Karikó Éva, fotók: Váradi Levente, Helikon kiadó, Budapest, 2014
- Böjte Csaba: Az igazgyöngy fájdalomból születik, füves könyv a szenvedésről, a méltóságteljes megöregedésről és az örök életről, összeállította: Karikó Éva, fotók: Váradi Levente, Helikon kiadó, Budapest, 2014
- Böjte Csaba: A virág a fény felé hajlik, füves könyv a gyermekvállalásról és a nevelésről, összeállította: Karikó Éva, fotók: Váradi Levente, Helikon kiadó, Budapest, 2015
- Böjte Csaba: A szeretet gyógyszer, nem jutalom, füves könyv a párbeszédről, a bizalomról, a megbocsátásról, összeállította: Karikó Éva, fotók: Váradi Levente, Helikon kiadó, Budapest, 2015
- Böjte Csaba: Zarándoklat az atyai házba, füves könyv az ember életútjáról, összeállította: Karikó Éva, fotók: Lettner Kriszta, Helikon kiadó, Budapest, 2016
- Böjte Csaba: Arra születtél, hogy ajándék legyél, füves könyv a szeretetről, a házasságról, az intimitásról és a párkapcsolati karambolokról, összeállította: Karikó Éva, fotók: Lettner Kriszta, Helikon kiadó, Budapest, 2016
- Böjte Csaba: A szabadság rabságában, füves könyv a párbeszédről, a bizalomról és a megbocsátásról, összeállította: Karikó Éva, fotók: Lettner Kriszta, Helikon kiadó, Budapest, 2017
- Böjte Csaba: A lélek lélegzetvétele, füves könyv a boldogság forrásáról, az Isten kereséséről, az élő hitről, az imáról és aszent és bűnös egyházról, összeállította: Karikó Éva, fotók: Lettner Kriszta, Helikon kiadó, Budapest, megjelenés: 2019. Ünnepi Könyvhét
- Az örömök útján. Csaba testvér gondolatai derűről, jóságról, hitről és bizakodásról; vál., szerk. L. Tóth Beáta; Lazi, Szeged, 2017
- Merjünk hinni és szeretni! Böjte Csaba testvér lelkesítő gondolatai és bölcs meglátásai az esztendő minden napjára; Szt. Gellért, Bp., 2018v

== Awards and recognition ==
- Hungarian Heritage Award (2002)
- Person of the Year 2004, from the Magyar Hírlap (The award was received in 2005)
- Aphelandra Award (2005) - Humanitarian Award
- Sütő András award (2007)
- The Pannon Role Model Foundation award (2008)
- Recipient of the first "Council of the Hundreds" Man of the Nation award in 2008
- Zajzoni Rab István Award (Transylvania, Brassó province, 2010)
- Median Cross of the Hungarian Republic (2010)
- The European Citizen Award (Civi Europaeo Praemium) awarded by the European Parliament in June 2011
- Giesswein memorial medal awarded by the Giesswein Sándor Memorial Office (2012)
- Hungarian Freedom Medal (2015)
- Pro Cultura Hungarica Award (2019)
- Makovecz Imre Award (2019)

In 2014 a civil initiative in Hungary collected signatures in an effort to award Böjte Csaba the Nobel Peace Prize.

== Films about Csaba Böjte ==
- Csillagösvény "Path of Stars" 1. (Dextramedia, 2004)
- Utazások egy szerzetessel "Journeys with a Friar" (Fekete Ibolya, 2005)
- Csillagösvény "Path of Stars" 2. (Dextramedia, 2006)

== Further Information ==
- The Saint Francis Foundation of Deva homepage
- Father Böjte's personal blog
- Books written by Father Böjte
