= Bertalan Tóth =

Hungarian lawyer and politician

Bertalan Tóth MP
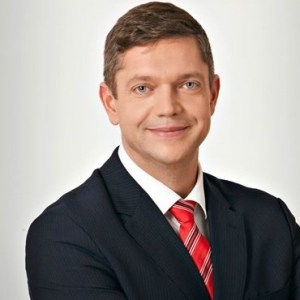

Member of the National Assembly
- In office 6 May 2014 – 9 May 2026

Chairman of the Hungarian Socialist Party
- In office 17 June 2018 – 22 October 2022
- Preceded by: Gyula Molnár
- Succeeded by: Ágnes Kunhalmi; Imre Komjáthi

Personal details
- Born: 10 November 1975 (age 50) Pécs, Hungary
- Party: Hungarian Socialist Party
- Education: University of Pécs

Bertalan Tóth (born 10 November 1975) is a Hungarian lawyer and politician. He served as leader of the Hungarian Socialist Party from 2018 to 2022, following Gyula Molnár's resignation.
