= Hungarian Socialist Party =

Hungarian political party

Hungarian Socialist Party Magyar Szocialista Párt
- Abbreviation: MSZP
- President: Imre Komjáthi
- Deputy President: Lajos Korózs
- Vice President: Zita Gurmai; Andrea Kis
- Presidium: Dávid Gyuris; Judit Hajmási; Dezső Hiszékeny; Benjamin Korózs; Roland Márton; Patrik Pusztai
- Founded: 7 October 1989; 37 years ago
- Preceded by: Hungarian Socialist Workers' Party
- Headquarters: 1114, Budapest, Villányi út 11-13.
- Youth wing: Societas – Baloldali Ifjúsági Mozgalom
- Membership (2021): 5,000
- Ideology: Social democracy Pro-Europeanism
- Political position: Centre-left to left-wing
- National affiliation: Unity (2014); United for Hungary (2020–2022); DK–MSZP–Dialogue (2024)
- European affiliation: Party of European Socialists
- European Parliament group: Progressive Alliance of Socialists and Democrats (2004–2024)
- International affiliation: Progressive Alliance; Socialist International
- Colours: Red
- National Assembly: 0 / 199
- European Parliament: 0 / 21
- County Assemblies: 1 / 381
- General Assembly of Budapest: 1 / 33

Party flag

Website
- mszp.hu

The Hungarian Socialist Party (Magyar Szocialista Párt [ˈmɒɟɒr ˈsot͡siɒliʃtɒ ˈpaːrt]), commonly known by its acronym MSZP (Hungarian: [ˈɛmɛspeː]), is a centre-left to left-wing social democratic and pro-European political party in Hungary.

It was founded on 7 October 1989 as a post-communist evolution and one of two legal successors of the Hungarian Socialist Workers' Party (MSZMP). Along with its conservative rival Fidesz, MSZP was one of the two most dominant parties in Hungarian politics until 2010; however, the party lost much of its popular support as a result of the Őszöd speech, the consequent 2006 protests in Hungary, and then the 2008 financial crisis. Following the 2010 election, MSZP became the largest opposition party in parliament, a position it held until 2018, when it was overtaken by the far-right-turned-centre-right Jobbik.

Since 2018, it has lost a significant amount of its influence in Hungarian political life. In the 2026 election, for the first time in its history, it did not field a party list and failed to win any individual seats; today, it is considered a minor party.

== History ==
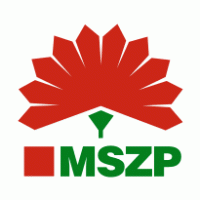
Hungarian Socialist Party logo pre-2012

The MSZP evolved from the communist Hungarian Socialist Workers' Party (or MSZMP), which ruled Hungary between 1956 and 1989. By the summer of 1989, the MSZMP was no longer a Marxist–Leninist party, and had been taken over by a faction of radical reformers who favoured jettisoning the Communist system in favour of a market economy. One of its leaders, Rezső Nyers, the architect of the New Economic Mechanism in the 1960s and 1970s, was elected as chairman of a four-man collective presidency that replaced the old MSZMP Politburo. Although General Secretary Károly Grósz, who had succeeded longtime leader János Kádár a year earlier, was elected to this body, Nyers now outranked him–and was thus now the de facto leader of Hungary.

At a party congress on 7 October 1989, the MSZMP dissolved and refounded itself as the MSZP, with Nyers as its first president. A marginal "Communist" faction led by Grósz broke away to form a revived Hungarian Communist Workers' Party, now known as the Hungarian Workers' Party, the other successor of the MSZMP.

The decision to declare the MSZP a successor of the MSZMP was controversial, and still carries repercussions for both the MSZP and Hungary. Another source of controversy is that some members of the former communist elite maintained political influence in the MSZP. Indeed, many key MSZP politicians were active members or held leadership positions within the MSZMP (like Gyula Horn and László Kovács).

On economic issues, the Socialists have often been greater advocates of liberal, free market policies than the conservative opposition, which has tended to favor more state interventionism in the economy through economic and price regulations, as well as through state ownership of key economic enterprises. The MSZP, in contrast, implemented a strong package of market reforms, austerity and privatization in 1995–96, called the Bokros package, when Hungary faced an economic and financial crisis. According to researchers, the elites of the Hungarian 'left' (MSZP and SZDSZ) have been differentiated from the 'right' by being more supportive of the classical neo-liberal economic policies, while the 'right' (especially extreme right) has advocated more interventionist policies. In contrast, issues like church and state and former communists show alignment along the traditional left-right spectrum. It is also noteworthy that, according to research, the MSZP elite's positions used to be closer to voters of the SZDSZ than to their own.

Besides a more liberal approach to the economy overall, the MSZP differentiated itself from the conservative opposition through its focus on transforming state social policy from a collection of measures that benefit the entire population, such as subsidies available to all citizens, to one based on financial and social need.

In the 2010s, the party started distancing itself from economic liberalism, adopting ideas inspired by left-wing european politicians such as then British Labour party leader Jeremy Corbyn and then Portuguese socialist prime minister Anónio Costa.

Besides Gyula Horn, the MSZP's most internationally recognized politicians were Ferenc Gyurcsány and László Kovács, a former member of the European Commission, responsible for taxation.

== Electoral history ==
The MSZP faced the voters for the first time at the 1990 elections, the first free elections held in Hungary in 44 years. It was knocked down to fourth place with only 33 seats.

Nyers handed the leadership to Horn, Hungary's last Communist foreign minister. Horn led the MSZP to an outright majority at the 1994 parliamentary election. Although the MSZP could have governed alone, he opted to form a coalition with the liberal Alliance of Free Democrats (SZDSZ). He not only wanted to allay concerns inside and outside Hungary of a former Communist party holding a majority, but needed the Free Democrats' votes to get economic reforms (what became the Bokros package) past his own party's left wing. Thus the MSZP was released from a so-called "political quarantine" imposed by the other Hungarian parties; during the first five years after the change of system, the other parties cooperated to shut out the MSZP from decision-making.

After being turned out of office in 1998, the party was able to form a renewed centre-left coalition with the Free Democrats in 2002.

At the 2006 elections, MSZP won with 43.2% of party list votes, which gave it 190 representatives out of 386 in the Parliament. The MSZP was therefore able to retain its coalition government from the previous term. In earlier elections, the MSZP polled 10.89% (1990), 32.98% (1994), 32.92% (1998) and 42.05% (2002).

After the successful fees abolishment referendum, MSZP formed the first minority government of Hungary, following the SZDSZ's backing out of the coalition with a deadline of 1 May 2008.

=== 2010s decline ===
On 21 March 2009 Gyurcsány announced his resignation as Prime Minister due to failure management of the economic crisis. Gordon Bajnai became the nominee of MSZP for the post of prime minister in March 2009 and he became Prime Minister on 14 April. Gyurcsány also resigned from his position of party chairman, which he had occupied since 2007.

MSZP lost half of its supporters during the European Parliament election in 2009, receiving only 17.37% of the votes and gaining four seats compared to the previous nine seats. This electoral defeat marked the end of the de facto two-party system in Hungary, which had lasted since 1998.

The Hungarian Socialist Party suffered a heavy defeat in the 2010 election (won by Fidesz with a two-thirds majority), gaining only 19.3% of the votes, and 59 seats in the parliament. Following the resignation of Ildikó Lendvai, the party's prime minister candidate Attila Mesterházy was elected Chairman of the Socialist Party. Nevertheless, MSZP became the biggest opposition party in Hungary.

The left-wing fragmented after the 2010 election; at first Katalin Szili left the MSZP to form Social Union (SZU), following the similarly significant defeated local elections in October 2010, nevertheless Gyurcsány's detachment was a much worse disaster for the Socialists. Initially, the former PM wanted to reform the party, but his goals remained in the minority. As a result, Gyurcsány, along with nine other members of the parliamentary group, left MSZP and established Democratic Coalition (DK). Thus MSZP's number of MPs reduced to 48.

The Socialist Party entered into an alliance with four other parties in January 2014 to contest the April parliamentary election. Mesterházy was elected candidate for the Prime Minister position, but the Unity alliance failed to win. After that the electoral coalition disestablished. On the 2014 European Parliament election, MSZP suffered the largest defeat since the 1990 parliamentary election, gaining third place and only 10% of the votes. After the obvious failure, Mesterházy and the entire presidium of the Socialist Party resigned.

József Tóbiás was elected leader of the Socialist Party on 19 July 2014 following the resignation of Mesterházy. He also became leader of the parliamentary group in September 2014. During his leadership, the Socialist Party won a parliamentary by-election (2014) and an important mayoral by-election (Salgótarján), however the party itself was permanently pushed back to the third place by far-right Jobbik according to the opinion polls. Tóbiás did not support the full cooperation and unification of the left-wing opposition parties against Viktor Orbán. During the MSZP party congress in June 2016, he was defeated by Gyula Molnár, a former Socialist MP and mayor, who succeeded him as party chairman. In February 2016, the party decided to sell its headquarters at Jókai Street for financial reasons. In June 2018, Bertalan Tóth was elected president in the MSZP, shortly after the party suffered its worst electoral defeat since 1990.

The party further declined in the 2019 European election, only scoring 6.61% of votes (even in alliance with Dialogue for Hungary) and being overtaken by the Democratic Coalition and Momentum. In 2019 local elections the party managed (due to cooperation with other parties) to win mayorships ir Érd and Szombathely. Also in these elections MSZP managed to win mayorships in those areas, where it never had a mayor since 1990 (e. g. Mohács).

The 2019 local election results caused resignations from the party on the local level (e. g. Szeged mayor Laszlo Botka).

In 2020, the party's congress supported a change to the party's structure. Instead of having one leader, the party would nominate two co-leaders – a man and woman (similar structure has been implemented in 2019 by the Social Democratic Party of Germany).

The party did not field candidates in the 2026 Hungarian parliamentary election, saying the only way to beat an electoral system that amounted to "legalised cheating" (or "legalised fraud", depending on the translation) was to unite behind "the strongest opposition candidate" regardless of party. It supported a change of government under the Tisza Party.

== Ideology ==
In political terms, the MSZP differentiates itself from its conservative opponents mainly in its rejection of Hungarian nationalism. The party is a member of the Progressive Alliance, the Socialist International, and the Party of European Socialists (PES), and it holds a chairmanship and several vice-chairmanships in committees at the European Parliament. The MSZP is a centre-left to left-wing party, but it has historically been centrist.

The MSZP's ideology has also been described as social democracy and social liberalism.

== Election results ==
=== National Assembly ===
Election	Leader	SMCs		MMCs		Seats	+/–	Status
Election	Leader	Votes	%	Votes	%	Seats	+/–	Status
1990	Rezső Nyers	504,995	10.18% (#4)	534,897	10.89% (#4)	33 / 386	New	Opposition
1994	Gyula Horn	1,689,081	31.27% (#1)	1,781,867	32.99% (#1)	209 / 386	▲176	Supermajority (MSZP-SZDSZ)
1998	Gyula Horn	1,332,412	29.82% (#1)	1,446,138	32.25% (#1)	134 / 386	▼75	Opposition
2002	Péter Medgyessy	2,277,732	40.50% (#1)	2,361,983	42.05% (#1)	178 / 386	▲44	Coalition (MSZP-SZDSZ)
2006	Ferenc Gyurcsány	2,175,312	40.26% (#1)	2,336,705	43.21% (#1)	190 / 386	▲12	Coalition (MSZP-SZDSZ) (2006-2008) (MSZP minority) (2008-2010)
2010	Attila Mesterházy	1,088,374	21.28% (#2)	990,428	19.30% (#2)	59 / 386	▼131	Opposition
Election	Leader	Constituency		Party list		Seats	+/–	Status
Election	Leader	Votes	%	Votes	%	Seats	+/–	Status
2014 (Note: Run within Unity coalition.)	Attila Mesterházy	1,317,879	26.85% (#2)	1,290,806	25.57% (#2)	29 / 199	▼30	Opposition
2018 (Note: Run in coalition with Dialogue for Hungary.)	Gergely Karácsony	622,458	11.31% (#3)	682,701	11.91% (#3)	17 / 199	▼12	Opposition
2022 (Note: Run within United for Hungary coalition.)	Bertalan Tóth; Ágnes Kunhalmi	1,983,708	36.90% (#2)	1,947,331	34.44% (#2)	10 / 199	▼7	Opposition
2026	Did not contest							

==== Single Member Constituencies voting consistently for MSZP ====
The image shows Single Member Constituencies (or SMCs) voting for MSZP in 1998, 2002, 2006 in dark red, while showing SMCs voting for MSZP in 2002 and 2006 in red. The dark red districts are considered the strongest positions of the party. Most if not all districts shown in dark red and red also voted for MSZP in 1994, a landslide victory for the party. So actually, dark red districts have an even longer uninterrupted voting history of supporting MSZP.

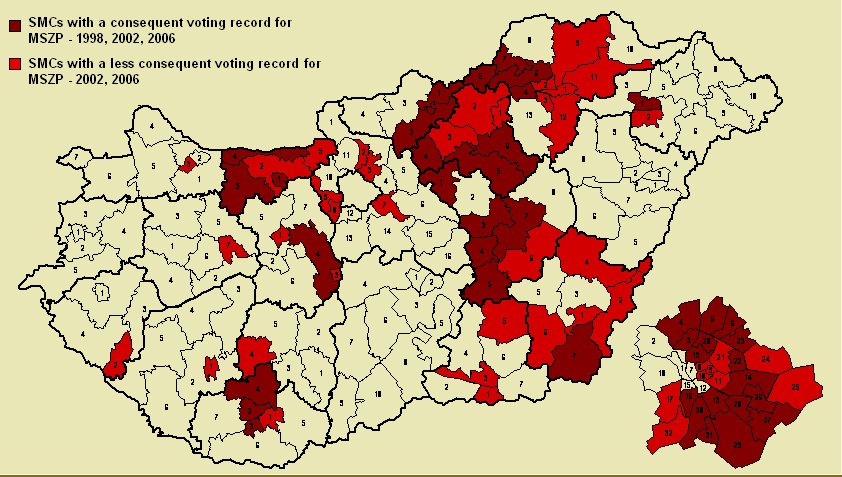
Consequently, MSZP SMCs won between 1998 and 2006

=== European Parliament ===
Election	List leader	Votes	%	Seats	+/−	EP Group
2004	László Kovács	1,054,921	34.30 (#2)	9 / 24	New	PES
2009	Kinga Göncz	503,140	17.37 (#2)	4 / 22	▼5	S&D
2014	Tibor Szanyi	252,751	10.90 (#3)	2 / 21	▼2	S&D
2019 (Note: Run in a joint list with Dialogue for Hungary.)	Bertalan Tóth	229,551	6.61 (#4)	1 / 21	▼1	S&D
2024 (Note: Run as part of the DK–MSZP–Dialogue coalition.)	Klára Dobrev	367,162	8.03 (#3)	0 / 21	▼1	−

== Party leaders ==
#	Image	Name	Entered office	Left office	Length of Leadership	Notice
1		Rezső Nyers	9 October 1989	27 May 1990	230 days	President of the MSZMP in 1989
2		Gyula Horn	27 May 1990	5 September 1998	8 years, 101 days	Prime Minister 1994–98
3		László Kovács	5 September 1998	16 October 2004	6 years, 41 days	Minister of Foreign Affairs 2002-04
4		István Hiller	16 October 2004	24 February 2007	2 years, 131 days	Minister of National Cultural Heritage 2003-05, Minister of Education and Culture 2006-10
5		Ferenc Gyurcsány	24 February 2007	5 April 2009	2 years, 40 days	Prime Minister 2004–09
6		Ildikó Lendvai	5 April 2009	10 July 2010	1 year, 96 days	
7		Attila Mesterházy	10 July 2010	29 May 2014	3 years, 323 days	
–		László Botka (interim)	31 May 2014	19 July 2014	49 days	Mayor of Szeged since 2002
8		József Tóbiás	19 July 2014	25 June 2016	1 year, 342 days	
9		Gyula Molnár	25 June 2016	17 June 2018	1 year, 357 days	Mayor of Budapest XI. 2002–10
10		Bertalan Tóth	17 June 2018	22 October 2022	4 years, 127 days	Male co-chair after 2020
11		Ágnes Kunhalmi	19 September 2020	19 October 2024	4 years, 30 days	Female co-chair
12		Imre Komjáthi	22 October 2022	Incumbent	4 years, 15 days	Male co-chair until 2024

== See also ==
- Politics of Hungary
- Hungarian Communist Party
