= Gyula Molnár =

Hungarian politician (born 1961)

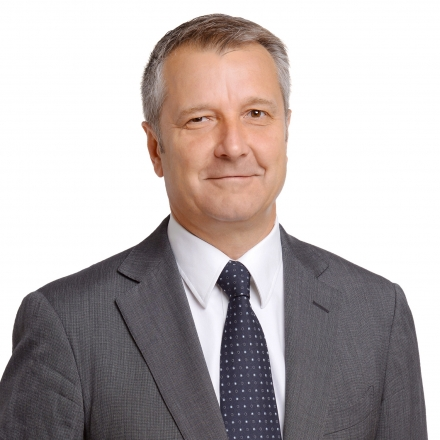

Chairman of the Hungarian Socialist Party
- In office 25 June 2016 – 8 April 2018
- Preceded by: József Tóbiás
- Succeeded by: Bertalan Tóth

Personal details
- Born: 17 August 1961 (age 64) Budapest, Hungary
- Party: MSZP (1989–2022); DK (2022–)
- Spouse: Dr Rózsa Bóta
- Children: Gergely; Gábor Milán
- Occupation: Politician

Gyula Molnár (born 17 August 1961) is a Hungarian politician who was the leader of the Hungarian Socialist Party between 2016 and 2018. He was a Member of Parliament from 1994 to 2010 and from 2018 to 2022, and also served as Mayor of Újbuda (the eleventh, and most populous, district of Budapest) from 2002 to 2010.

== Personal life ==
He is married to Dr. Rózsa Bóta; together they have two sons, Gergely and Gábor Milán.

Political offices
Preceded by Katalin Juhos	Mayor of Újbuda; 2002–2010	Succeeded by Tamás Hoffmann
Party political offices
Preceded by József Tóbiás	Chairman of the Hungarian Socialist Party; 2016–2018	Succeeded by Bertalan Tóth
