= László Botka =

Hungarian politician and jurist, mayor of Szeged

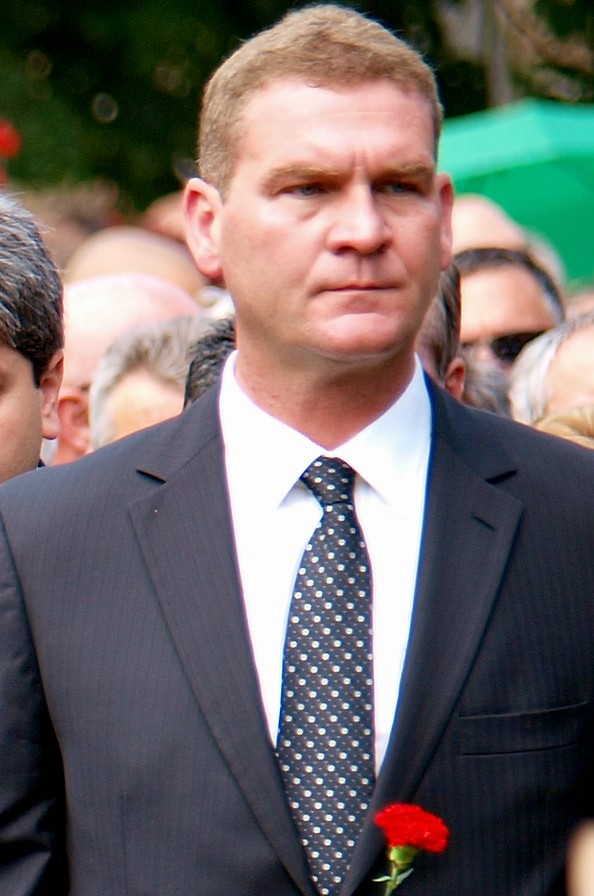
- Botka in 2013 at the funeral of Gyula Horn

Mayor of Szeged
- Incumbent
- Assumed office 20 October 2002
- Preceded by: László Bartha

Acting Chairman of the Hungarian Socialist Party
- In office 31 May 2014 – 19 July 2014
- Preceded by: Attila Mesterházy
- Succeeded by: József Tóbiás

Member of the National Assembly
- In office 21 April 2002 – 12 October 2014
- In office 29 May 1994 – 24 May 1998

Personal details
- Born: László István Botka; 21 February 1973 (age 53) Tiszaföldvár, Hungary
- Party: Hungarian Socialist Party (MSZP) (1991–2019)
- Spouse: Dr. Andrea Lugosi
- Children: Zsófia Erzsébet Botka (2000); Veronika Julianna Botka (2003); Valéria Botka (2008)
- Education: University of Szeged, Varga Katalin Secondary School (Szolnok)
- Occupation: Politician, MP, Mayor
- Profession: Lawyer

László István Botka (born 21 February 1973) is a Hungarian politician. Botka was a member of the Hungarian Socialist Party between 1991 and 2019, and the current mayor of Szeged.

== Biography ==
Botka was born on 21 February 1973, in Tiszaföldvár, Hungary, as the first of two sons of Lajos Botka and Julianna Mária Lukács, both secondary school teachers. He attended the Varga Katalin Secondary School in Szolnok. In 1991, he moved to Szeged to study at the Faculty of Law of the University of Szeged, from which he graduated in 1997. He joined the Hungarian Socialist Party in 1991. Between 1992 and 1994, he was leader of the socialist youth organization. In 1994, he was elected to represent Szeged in the National Assembly of Hungary, becoming the youngest of the MPs. He lost his seat in the general elections held in 1998, but he was re-elected in 2002, 2006 and 2010. In 2002, he was elected to Mayor of Szeged; he was re-elected in 2006, 2010, 2014, 2019 and 2024.

Upon the resignation of Attila Mesterházy following the disastrous 2014 European Parliament election, Botka was elected interim leader of the Socialist Party as chairman of the organization's National Election Committee.

== Personal life ==
Botka is married Dr. Andrea Lugosi in 1997 and they have 3 children.

Political offices
Preceded by László Bartha	Mayor of Szeged; 2002–	Succeeded by Incumbent
Party political offices
Preceded by Attila Mesterházy	Chairman of the Hungarian Socialist Party; Acting; 2014	Succeeded by József Tóbiás
Honorary titles
Preceded by Róbert Répássy	Youngest sitting Member of Parliament; 1994–1998	Succeeded by János Zuschlag
