= 2014 Hungarian parliamentary election =

- 6 April 2014

All 199 seats in the National Assembly 100 seats needed for a majority
- Turnout: 61.73% (▼2.65 pp)
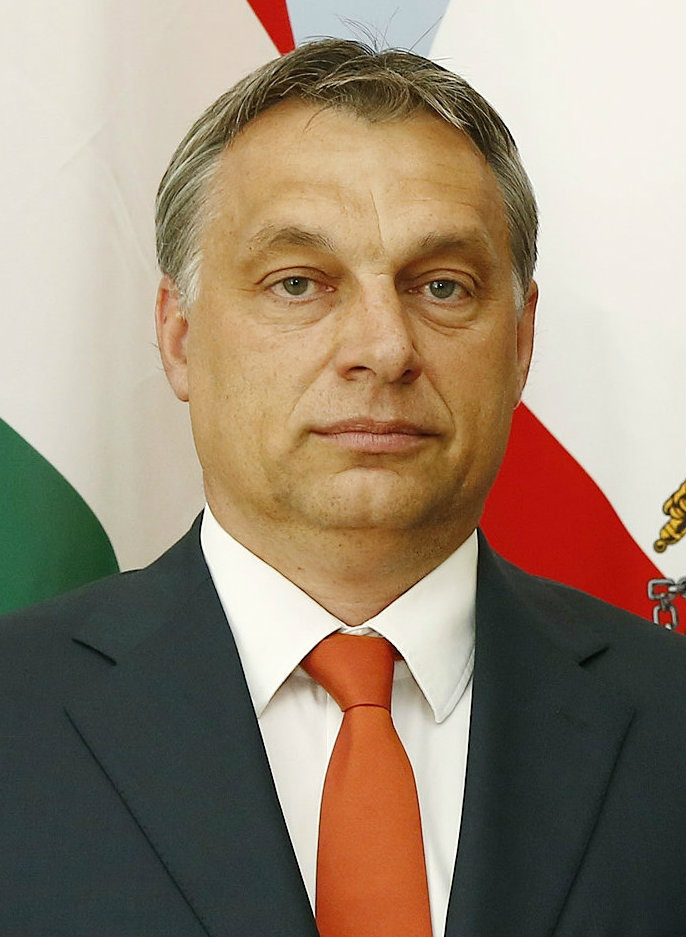

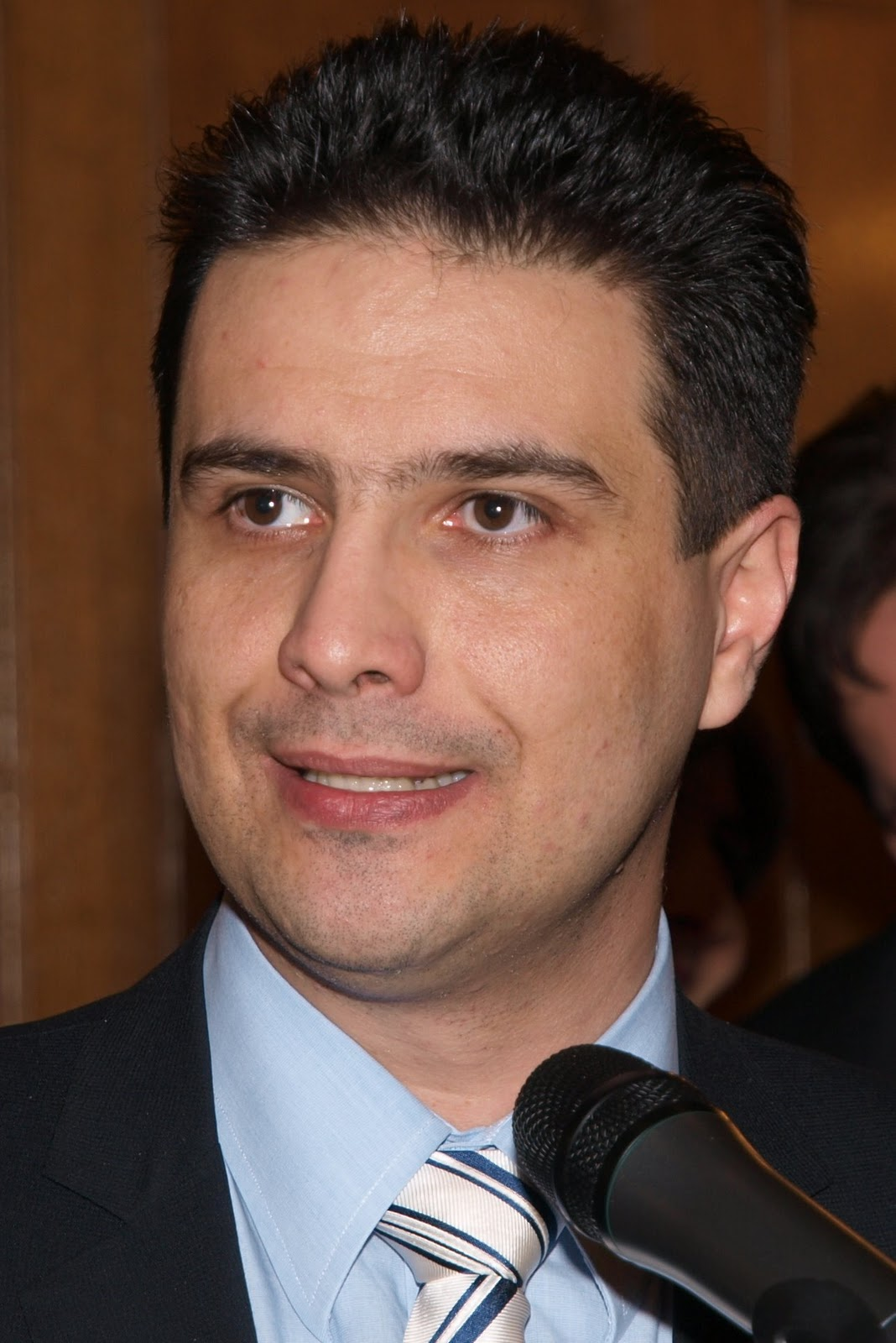

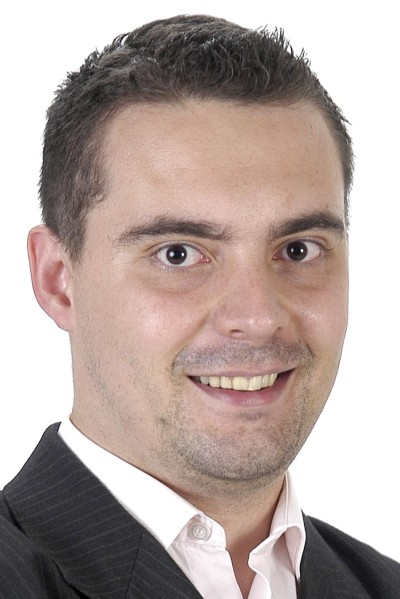

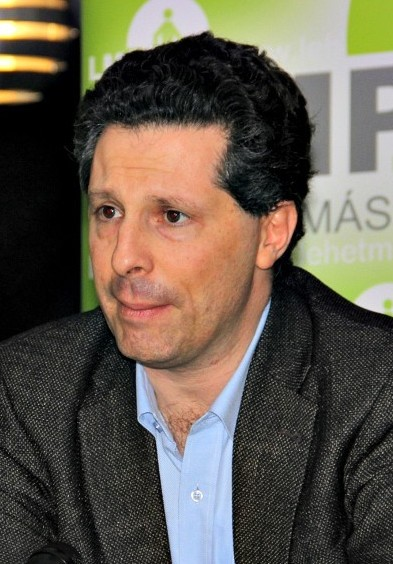
	First party	Second party
Leader	Viktor Orbán	Attila Mesterházy
Party	Fidesz	MSZP
Alliance	Fidesz–KDNP	Összefogás
Leader since	17 May 2003 (Note: As Fidesz leader.)	14 January 2014 (Note: Mesterházy was selected as Unity's Prime Minister candidate on 14 January 2014. He had also served as leader of the MSZP since 10 July 2010.)
Last election	263 seats, 52.73%	59 seats, 19.30% (Note: MSZP only.)
Seats won	133	38
Constituency vote	2,165,342	1,317,879
%	44.11%	26.85%
Party vote	2,264,780	1,290,806
% and swing	44.87% ▼7.86 pp	25.57% ▲6.27 pp
	Third party	Fourth party
Leader	Gábor Vona	András Schiffer
Party	Jobbik	LMP
Leader since	25 November 2006	24 March 2013 (Note: Schiffer was the lead candidate for the party. He had also served as co-president of the LMP since 24 March 2013.)
Last election	47 seats, 16.67%	16 seats, 7.48%
Seats won	23	5
Constituency vote	1,000,637	244,191
%	20.39%	4.97%
Party vote	1,020,476	269,414
% and swing	20.22% ▲3.55 pp	5.34% ▼2.14 pp
- Results of the election. A darker shade indicates a higher vote share. Proportional list results are displayed in the top left.
Government before election
Second Orbán Government
Fidesz–KDNP
Government after election
Third Orbán Government
Fidesz–KDNP

Parliamentary elections were held in Hungary on 6 April 2014. This parliamentary election was the 7th since the 1990 first multi-party election. The result was a victory for the Fidesz–KDNP alliance, preserving its two-thirds majority, with Viktor Orbán remaining Prime Minister.

It was the first election under the new Constitution of Hungary which came into force on 1 January 2012. The new electoral law also entered into force that day. For the first time since Hungary's transition to democracy, the election had a single round. The voters elected 199 MPs instead of the previous 386 lawmakers.

== Background ==
In the 2010 parliamentary elections Fidesz-KDNP won a landslide victory, with Viktor Orbán being elected prime minister. As a result of this election, his government was able to alter the National Constitution, as he garnered a two-thirds majority. The government was able to write a constitutional article that favored traditional marriages, as well as one that lowered the number of MPs elected from 386 to 199.

Orbán and his government remained relatively popular in the months leading to the election. This was largely because of high GDP growth, increased industrial output, and a growth in the tourism sector.

=== New constitution and electoral law ===
In 2010 a new government led by Fidesz–KDNP initiated a drafting process for a new constitution. On 18 April 2011, parliament approved the constitution on a 262–44 vote, with Fidesz and their Christian Democrat coalition partners in favor and Jobbik opposed. The Hungarian Socialist Party (MSZP) and Politics Can Be Different (LMP), citing the ruling party's unwillingness to compromise on issues and their inability to change the outcome, boycotted both the drafting process and the vote. On 25 April, President Pál Schmitt signed the document into law, and it entered into force on the first day of 2012. The enactment came halfway through Hungary's six-month Presidency of the Council of the European Union.

A new electoral law was also passed on 23 December 2011. The Fidesz and its coalition partner Christian Democratic People's Party (KDNP) unilaterally approved the new bill, using their two-thirds majority, ignoring the left-wing opposition's (MSZP and LMP) protests, while Jobbik voted against it. The NGO Political Capital noted in its analysis that the newly-adopted law "shifts the election system towards the majoritarian principle", which may be the cause of possible future "disproportional" outcomes in favour of individual parliamentary seats, resulting an emergence of voting method like first-past-the-post voting (FPTP). Nevertheless, Political Capital also emphasized that this tendency "however [can] not be interpreted as an injury to democracy."

=== Voter registration plan ===
On 26 November 2012, Fidesz used its supermajority to pass legislation revising eligibility for voting. Accordingly, the citizens, who had to right to vote, should have been involved in a pre-registration process no later than 15 days before polling day "in order to spare politically indifferent citizens from the election campaign", as Fidesz officials said. According to critics, this process would have made it harder to vote the party out of power, while also threatened free suffrage with the determination of the time limit. Four members of the Democratic Coalition (DK), including its leader, former Prime Minister Ferenc Gyurcsány, had participated in a week-long hunger strike, protesting against the proposed voter registration plan, while President János Áder, who took the office after the resignation of Schmitt and himself was also a Fidesz member, sent the bill to the Constitutional Court.

On 3 January 2013, the Court ruled that the law curtailed voting rights to an "unjustifiable degree", due to the fact that the requirement for voters to register prior to going to the polls applies to every voter. The court also argued the limitation of campaign advertisings into the public broadcasting (Magyar Televízió and its partners), the proposed bans of political advertisements on cinemas during the campaign as well as prohibition of opinion polls in the last six days of the campaign "threatens" the freedom of speech in Hungary, in addition to its unconstitutional nature. After the court's decision the head of the Fidesz parliamentary group, Antal Rogán, announced his party "would drop the proposal" and they will not introduce it for the 2014 parliamentary election, despite the fact that some party members had considered just before the court's ruling that is possible that constitutional amendments can take place in order to pass the bill.

=== Party splits after 2010 election ===
Party affiliation in the National Assembly
Affiliation	Members	
Affiliation	14 May 2010	5 May 2014
Fidesz	227	223
MSZP	59	47
Jobbik	47	43
KDNP	36	34
LMP	16	7
DK	–	10
PM	–	8
Independent	1	9
Total number of seats	386	381

After the 2010 local elections, held on 3 October, Katalin Szili, former Speaker of the National Assembly founded the Social Union party and became its first chairperson. As a result, she quit the Hungarian Socialist Party (MSZP) and the party's parliamentary group, continuing her work as a formally independent MP. In October 2011, a group of members of the MSZP around former Prime Minister Ferenc Gyurcsány left the party and founded the Democratic Coalition (DK) after one year of tension and disagreement. Ten members of the parliament, including Gyurcsány, also left the MSZP parliamentary group and became independent MPs. Gyurcsány said the cause of secession was that the MSZP "had failed in its efforts to transform itself". His former Socialist colleagues strongly condemned his step, as Gyurcsány signed a statement not to quit the party, swearing allegiance to the new party leadership just one week before leaving. At the introduction of his new movement, Gyurcsány called the new constitution as "illegitimate", and charged that all branches of power such as the Constitutional Court, Chief Prosecutor Péter Polt and other units of the judicial system "exclusively serve Viktor Orbán".

Since its establishment and 2010 national election, LMP was kept under pressure (for instance, on the occasion of by-elections) by the Hungarian Socialist Party to achieve some kind of electoral compromise and cooperation against Viktor Orbán's government. The leadership of the LMP positioned the party to the centre, and, as a newcomer, rejected both Fidesz and MSZP's politics. Prominent party member András Schiffer also criticized the previous Socialist cabinets, blaming Gyurcsány's "disastrous governance" for Fidesz winning a two-thirds majority in 2010. However prominent politicians in LMP were divided on the issue of cooperation. During the party's congress in November 2012, LMP decided not to join Together 2014, the planned electoral alliance of opposition parties and movements led by Gordon Bajnai. As a result, Benedek Jávor, a proponent of the agreement, resigned from his position of parliamentary group leader. Jávor and his supporters (including Tímea Szabó and Gergely Karácsony) founded a platform within the party, called "Dialogue for Hungary" on 26 November 2012. The platform argued in favour of conclusion of an electoral agreement with Bajnai's movement in order to replace "Orbán's regime". In January 2013, the LMP's congress rejected again the electoral cooperation with other opposition parties, including Together 2014. As a result, members of the party's "Dialogue for Hungary" platform left LMP to form a new political organization. Benedek Jávor announced the eight leaving MPs would not resign from their parliamentary seats, while seven parliamentarians (Schiffer's supporters) remained in the party. The leaving MPs founded the Dialogue for Hungary as an officially registered party in March 2013. On 8 March 2013, the PM established an electoral coalition with the Together, which was formed as a political party on that day.

In January 2013, two independent MPs who were elected from the Jobbik's national list but were expelled or resigned from the party earlier (Zsolt Endrésik and Ernő Rozgonyi) announced that they would henceforth represent the Hungarian Justice and Life Party (MIÉP) in the National Assembly. MIÉP had parliamentary representation the last time in 2002.

=== Opposition cooperation negotiations ===
Gordon Bajnai, who served as Prime Minister between 2009 and 2010, preceding Orbán, announced his return to politics on 23 October 2012, during the anti-government demonstration of the One Million for Press Freedom (Milla) non-governmental organization. On the protest, he called for an anti-Orbán coalition so as to form a supermajority in Parliament with the help of which the changes done by Orbán's ruling party, Fidesz could be undone.

In his speech, Bajnai repeatedly used a variant of the term ("We may fail on our own, but together, we shall prove victorious!"), when he proclaimed his support for such a "cooperation between hopeful left-wingers, disappointed rightwingers, politically abandoned free-thinkers and committed Greens" that his organization along with two other civilian body named Together 2014 as a reference to the date of the next general elections in Hungary. In December 2012, Bajnai announced that he intends to become a Member of Parliament in the 2014 national election. Medián polled 22 then 16 percent for the first time to the Together movement among the "certain" voters in their two November surveys. Several scholars criticized the Medián's questioning method which was different from previous ones, suspecting a political intent behind the surveys.

According to plans, Together 2014 would have been an umbrella organization of centre-left parties, similar to the Olive Tree in Italy which established against Silvio Berlusconi's right-wing coalition in 1995. However LMP had rejected the cooperation in November 2012 and January 2013, and the Socialists led by Attila Mesterházy gradually took over the initiative. Consequently, the Together movement transformed itself into party on 8 March 2013, as only parties could take part in the election according to the rules. On the same day, the Dialogue for Hungary, which was founded by deserters from the LMP, has established an electoral coalition with the Together.

==== 2013 agreement ====
In late August 2013, Socialist and Together party leaders agreed to nominate joint individual candidates in each constituency, but would register separate national lists for the upcoming parliamentary election. To avoid the escalation of personal conflicts of interest, they decided not to appoint a joint candidate for the position of Prime Minister; it was announced that party leader, whose party would become the strongest government force following the election, will automatically gain the office. Socialist leader Attila Mesterházy told public television M1 that the electoral alliance between the MSZP and the E14–PM on fielding a single centre-left candidate in each individual constituency provides the right basis for success. Mesterházy and Bajnai agreed MSZP will field candidates in 75 out of all the country's 106 individual constituencies and the E14–PM in the remaining 31. The agreement was sharply criticised by the Democratic Coalition, which was excluded from the cooperation. Gyurcsány called it as a "failure" and said that party leaders Mesterházy and Bajnai "spoofed themselves, us and, finally, the democratic Hungary". Fidesz spokesman Péter Hoppál said this agreement showed that the opposition parties were unable to learn from their own past mistakes. "They were fired by the majority of voters [in 2010] not because they were leftists but because they placed their personal ambitions above the interests of the country", he added.

In September 2013, the Socialist Party declined to sign an election deal with the Democratic Coalition and Gábor Fodor's Hungarian Liberal Party because "both parties presented excessive expectations compared to their social support", according to Attila Mesterházy. The party chairman told a forum held at the party HQ, broadcast by left-wing commercial news channel ATV, that in order to win next year's election, the Socialists need to win over uncertain voters. The party board declared that running with Gyurcsány, one of the most unpopular politicians, would keep uncertain voters away, he added. In response, Gyurcsány said the MSZP had proposed cooperation in four instead of nine constituencies, all of which were impossible to win. In addition they offered every 25th place on their party list and would have banned Gyurcsány himself from running either individually or on a list. Another request was that DK should not present a platform of its own, while nominating its candidates to the MSZP national list. The party could not accept these conditions, the politician said.

==== 2014 agreement ====
Gordon Bajnai said on 6 January 2014, he plans to hold talks with Socialist Party on expanding and further developing an agreement between the opposition parties. "We must give back faith in victory to all those that want a change of government. We believe that this requires the closest cooperation, with the possibility of a joint list, between opposition forces with considerable public support. In order to achieve this, each participant must make sacrifices," the party said in a statement sent to MTI, quoting a recent television interview with Bajnai. This meant creating an opportunity to include DK in the electoral cooperation made the last year. Following that the two parties began negotiations to expand their electoral agreement; "we should make every possible effort to oust Fidesz from power, and reach an agreement that would help canvas undecided voters", said Viktor Szigetvári, co-leader of the Together 2014. "There should be a single left-wing candidate in each of the 106 constituencies, and no vote cast on an opposition candidate should go lost", he added.

The Socialist Party and the Together concluded an agreement on 8 January 2014 in order to set a joint list for the upcoming parliamentary election. Accordingly, MSZP acquired the right to nominate the common prime minister, likely to be Attila Mesterházy, who has previously expressed his intention to run for the office. Mesterházy announced they will propose to join the Democratic Coalition and he said the agreement could succeed. Ferenc Gyurcsány welcomed the agreement and said DK is ready to begin tripartite negotiations immediately. Gyurcsány also announced on Facebook that he would interrupt his freedom abroad and travel home immediately. These took place already the next day. Because of Gyurcsány's involvement, Péter Juhász, the leader of the Milla (a component of the Together alliance) offered his resignation and stepped down from his party's national list (but remained an individual candidate in Belváros-Lipótváros).

Fidesz spokeswoman Gabriella Selmeczi called the left-wing party list "completely irrelevant" for the election, because "they are all the same old people, with no new face among them." She said that "they are the same people who have already ruined Hungary once." The radical nationalist Jobbik said the agreement between the Socialists and Together–PM demonstrated the "rebirth of the coalition of lies." In the current situation, Hungarian voters can only choose between the politicians who destroyed Hungary in the past 24 years (i.e. Fidesz and left-wing opposition) or Jobbik that will bring a change, spokeswoman Dóra Dúró said. "When replacing Orbán's government, Jobbik will not bring Gyurcsány back to power", she added. The minor opposition LMP party will not enter any electoral alliance with political forces that used to be in power, party co-leader András Schiffer emphasized. He added, the green party insists on its original position and offers an alternative to those who wished the Gyurcsány and Bajnai governments "would go to hell" in 2010 and also to those who are now fed up with the "regime of national cynicism." (i.e. the Orbán government).

On 14 January 2014, the left-wing opposition parties agreed to submit a joint list for the spring general election, party leaders announced during a press conference. Accordingly, the national list was headed by MSZP party chairman Attila Mesterházy, who also became candidate of the electoral cooperation for the position of prime minister. In the national list, Mesterházy was followed by two former prime ministers, Gordon Bajnai, informal leader of the Together–Dialogue alliance and Ferenc Gyurcsány, leader of the Democratic Coalition (DK). Gábor Fodor, leader of the minor extra-parliamentary Hungarian Liberal Party was put to the fourth place, while co-chair of the Together–Dialogue alliance Tímea Szabó came to the fifth place on the joint list of the five opposition parties. Under the agreement, the Socialists were able to nominate their candidates in 71 individual constituencies, while the Together–PM altogether 22 and DK 13. Antal Rogán, leader of the Fidesz parliamentary group, said the result of the agreement is that the Hungarian left has been unable to nominate "a real prime minister candidate" or "present any new face," according to MTI.

Party	Leader	Ideology	Candidates	
Party	Leader	Ideology	Constituency (106)	Party-list (60)
Hungarian Socialist Party	Attila Mesterházy	Social democracy	71	42
Together 2014–Dialogue for Hungary	Gordon Bajnai; Benedek Jávor	Social liberalism Green liberalism	22	9
Democratic Coalition	Ferenc Gyurcsány	Social liberalism	13	6
Hungarian Liberal Party	Gábor Fodor	Liberalism	0	3

== Electoral system ==
The electoral laws were changed in 2012. The following significant changes have been issued in the electoral system:

- One round system, which replaced the pre-existing two-round system (and this eliminated the possibility of the candidates stepping back in favor of each other between the two rounds).
- No 50%, nor 25% turnout is necessary. (formerly 50% turnout was needed for the first round and 25% for the second round)
- 199 seats (decreased from 386, so the number of seats is 51.6% of the original)
  - 106 constituency seats (decreased from 176, increased from 45.6% to 53.3% of all seats)
  - 93 party-list seats, including minority-list seats (decreased from the 210 regional (county) and national list seats which were merged, decreased from 54.4% to 46.7% of all seats)
- 5% threshold still exists in the case of party-list, and 10% in the case of two parties' joint list, 15% in the case of three or more parties' joint list.
- Minorities will be able to form a minority-list, in the elections they only need to reach the 5% threshold out of all minority votes, and not out of all party-list votes, which – practically – makes it possible to send only few minority representatives (maybe only one) to the National Assembly (for about 1% of all votes, minorities can send MPs to the National Assembly)

Every citizen has two votes – one to vote for a constituency candidate and one to vote for a party list. The 106 constituency seats are distributed by a one-round plurality system, meaning simply, that the candidate receiving most votes gets elected (compared to the previous two-round majority-plurality system). The distribution of 93 party-list seats is based both on the results of the party and constituency votes. To total of the votes for party-lists, some constituency-votes are added. This happens in two ways:

- First, votes that were cast for all constituency candidates that didn’t get elected are added to the respective parties of those candidates.
- Second, part of the votes for the victorious constituency candidates is transferred to their parties. Number of transferred votes equals to Number of votes won by the winning candidate minus number of votes won by the second candidate minus one. The logic behind the formula is to transfer all the votes that the winning candidate didn’t actually need to secure election. E.g. if the first candidate receives 15 000 votes and the second 5 000, the winner would have won even if he received 9 999 fewer votes, than he actually did. These votes are thus added to the party total for distribution of nation-wide party list seats. Based on these votes totals, the seats are than distributed among parties by d’Hondt formula.

Minorities that do not reach the 5% threshold (out of all minority-list votes, not out of all votes) or do not get at least one seat, can send a minority spokesman to the National Assembly from 2014, who has the right only to speak but not to vote. Obtaining one seat out of 93 is much more difficult for minorities than reaching the 5% threshold for minority votes because a seat represents slightly more than 1% of all party and minority lists (while 5% of minority votes are expected to be much less than 1% of all votes, as the number of minority voters is well below 20%). This minority spokesperson solution gives minorities the opportunity to speak in Parliament, even if they are unable to obtain about 1% of all votes. In practice, the German and Roma minorities have a chance to obtain MPs (according to the latest census), and the other 13 minorities will have a minority spokesperson, guaranteeing their representation in parliament.

The right to vote is first extended to Hungarian citizens who do not have a permanent residence in Hungary (i.e. mostly the Hungarian diaspora in the neighboring countries); however, they can only vote for the national list of Hungarian parties, so they do not have a chance to vote in individual constituencies.

== Campaign ==
The election campaign officially began on 15 February 2014, 50 days prior to election according to the law. Activists from both Fidesz and Unity collected at least 500 signatures in support of their candidates in all 106 constituencies on 17 February.

The Organization for Security and Co-operation in Europe (OSCE) proposed sending only a very limited observer mission to 6 April, day of the election. "It is important that the new election rules already include the regulations formulated by international observers, which guarantee the participation of observers in the entire voting process", the pro-government Centre for Fundamental Rights (Hungarian: Alapjogokért Központ) said on 2 March 2014. The OSCE has various types of observer mission that it can launch, and it has opted for the most limited one, the statement added. In their interim report on 25 March, OSCE highlighted concerns about media freedom in Hungary. It said that the selection process for members of the new Media Council watchdog was "of major concern" as it is currently "politically homogeneous", while the impartiality of the Magyar Távirati Iroda (MTI) and state television Magyar Televízió is questionable, and the most watched commercial channels either have a good relationship with the government or only broadcast entertainment programs.

Unity leader Attila Mesterházy challenged Prime Minister Viktor Orbán on 15 March 2014 to a televised debate to the date 5 April, a day before the election. However, Fidesz dismissed Mesterházy's call on 16 March, as they "do not see an opportunity for a television debate, because the Left does not have a candidate suitable for government". In its statement, the ruling party said that the left-wing parties cannot offer "a real alternative", and so "conditions for a debate have not been met". On the same day, LMP co-chair András Schiffer also challenged the leaders of the national lists of the parliamentary parties to an election debate. Schiffer said he wanted to discuss job creation, reducing corruption and diminishing Hungary's dependencies.

=== Fidesz–KDNP ===
From the middle of January 2014, the primary campaign theme of the governing coalition was the reduction of utility costs. Fidesz politician Máté Kocsis announced on 4 January that the party will organize 119 local forums with the participation of around 30 of their politicians to emphasize the issue. Kocsis said "at the forums, they call on people to defend what the government has achieved, even if it means becoming activists of the Fidesz–KDNP campaign", noting that "the left-wing parties are preparing to erase the achievements of previous public service providers, namely the price reductions". Zsolt Gréczy, the spokesperson of the Democratic Coalition objected to the use of the term "Hungarian Team" in the invitation letters to the forums to describe the activists defending the utility reduction. Prime Minister Viktor Orbán sent a letter to those residents who previously supported the utility reduction with their signatures. He wrote: "we need to come together to further reduce residential overhead." [...] "Foreign public service companies – with domestic and international political connections – are trying to settle costs by cutting costs in order to use next year's elections to assert their interests. If we want to protect our mutually achieved results, then we have to unite again." Fidesz decided to submit a bill to the Parliament on the reduction of household utilities in three steps in 2014, as announced by Fidesz caucus leader Antal Rogán in Budapest on 25 January. Accordingly, gas prices will be reduced by 6.5 percent from 1 April, electricity prices by 5.7 percent from 1 September, and district heat prices by 3.3 percent from 1 October 2014.

The pro-government Civil Unity Forum (CÖF) sent a pamphlet in January 2014 to every Hungarian household with rundown of the eight years of the MSZP–SZDSZ governments and the "Gyurcsány coalition's seven major sins". They also told the press that the CÖF would hold a "peace march" on 29 March to demonstrate for national values, sovereignty, the institution of the family and democracy.

Viktor Orbán told parliament ahead of the start of the spring session on 3 February 2014 that "the most important tasks for 2014 are to protect the government's scheme to cut household utility bills and press further ahead with them". He said "the Brussels multinationals, banks and bureaucrats are planning a new attack against Hungarian families but we won't accept this injustice or the double-standards, and will not allow policies serving their greediness and extra profits". Orbán insisted Hungary is now in a better position than four years ago and its performance is constantly improving. The budget deficit has consistently stayed below 3 percent of GDP, and, for the first time since the change in regime, both the trade balance and current-account balance is improving. Inflation has hit a 40-year low. He added the government has set the "ambitious but not impossible" aim that a third of Hungary's exports should be directed to non-European markets in 2018.

On 8 February 2014, the party's steering board has approved the governing parties' national list of election candidates, headed by Prime Minister and party leader Viktor Orbán. He was followed on the list by leader of the KDNP Zsolt Semjén, Speaker of the National Assembly László Kövér, and First Officer Márta Mátrai. Presenting the 150-member list, Lajos Kósa told a press conference that it is not ruled out that the alliance will again win two-thirds support in the spring election. News portal Index.hu emphasized that only one woman was nominated for the first thirty places on the list. The ruling party took over the slogan "Hungary performs better" from the government and adapted it for the campaign posters. On 16 February, Orbán said in his regular annunal review speech to hundreds of party members and supporters that "we know very well that today there are two paths ahead of us, we must choose between two options, two ideologies and two forces. The future or the past. It's very simple: building the future, or a restoration of post-communism."

Zsolt Nyitrai, Fidesz's public relations director announced Viktor Orbán, members of the cabinet and MP candidates will start a road show on 10 March 2014 that will take them all around the country in the four weeks till the general election. Fidesz–KDNP's giant election posters went through a renewal from 10 March and focused on four topics: job protection and workplace creation, the defense of the value of pensions, the continuation of utilities price cuts and keeping a "family-friendly system of subsidies". Nyitrai said Fidesz candidates have received 2 million signatures so far.

A pro-government "peace march" held on 29 March 2014, approximately 500,000 people marched into the Heroes' Square, where Fidesz held a campaign rally. Joseph Daul, the President of the European People's Party (EPP), and István Pásztor, the head of the Alliance of Vojvodina Hungarians (VMSZ) also attended the event and voiced support for Orbán. The Prime Minister asked Hungarians for "another four years" in his speech. He said his government had restructured and modernized Hungary, "building a dependable, fast, intrepid race car from a run-down, sputtering jalopy with flats." He added, in 2010 "we showed that history can be written with unity, not only with violence, blood and arms," adding that the second chapter of this "magnificent story" was to follow.

=== Unity ===
The center-left opposition forces have decided to campaign under a single name and have plumped for "Unity" (Hungarian: Összefogás) on 23 January 2014. On the ballot paper, as they announced, all their party names (MSZP, E14, DK, Liberals and PM) and logos will appear, but they will cooperate in campaigning with a single image. Consequently the parties did not establish a single election party.

The main opposition MSZP elected party leader Attila Mesterházy on 25 January 2014 as the prime minister-candidate of the Unity electoral alliance. He received 99.7 percent support and the party unanimously approved the alliance of five opposition parties signed earlier. During a subsequent campaign march, Mesterházy told that only their Unity coalition is able to overthrow the Viktor Orbán cabinet, so everyone who wants a change should support it in the upcoming election. He said the Fidesz-led government should be ousted because its policies are unacceptable in a democracy, irresponsible for the economy and damaging to society. Hungarians must decide whether they want a modern, European republic or "the restoration of the [interwar] Horthy era," he said. Mesterházy described the "Orbán-Putin pact" on the planned upgrade of the Paks Nuclear Power Plant as a project that demonstrates all the faults of the Fidesz. What has happened to Paks is typical of what goes on throughout the country, which involves one person making decisions behind everyone's back in a way that would be inconceivable in a democratic country based on the rule of law, he added. He promised that once they enter government, they will review the deal with Russia and the expansion of the power station will be decided upon only after "asking people's opinion." Mesterházy also described the planned memorial dedicated to the victims of the German occupation of Hungary's as a "falsification of history".

On 2 February 2014, Unity gathered for a demonstration in Budapest to protest against the planned upgrade of nuclear power plant in Paks. Gordon Bajnai referred to Hungary's upcoming general election and said that voters will "select a future" on 6 April. "We can choose between becoming a post-Soviet country, 'Orbanistan', or we can vote for an independent and democratic European constitutional state, a 'normal' Hungary, he said. Ferenc Gyurcsány told "we reject that the prime minister, who happens to be called Viktor Orbán, should behave like a baron and decide over our life," and called Orbán a "liar, traitor".

The left-wing alliance changed its name from "Összefogás" to "Kormányváltás" (Change of Government), Socialist campaign chief manager Zsolt Molnár told ATV on 6 March 2014. He said, everyone has come to realize that opposition unity has been brought about, so it is no longer worth using that slogan in the final lap of the campaign. The Unity Party, led by former mayor of Monok Zsolt Szepessy, sued the party alliance of Unity because of "name, slogan and trademark theft" on 10 February 2014. According to Viktor Szigetvári, campaign chief of Together party, the use of the word "Unity" is not prohibited, and they planned not to campaign with this name in the last weeks anyway. The Unity Party was also able to set up its national list, thus the left-wing opposition said it would have disrupted the voters.

On 30 March 2014, about 80,000 demonstrators gathered in front of the Hungarian State Opera House in Budapest. The demonstration was held in place of the 15 March event, which was canceled because of the weather. Gyurcsány said "we will send Orbán to where he belongs, to the dustbin of history and politics", adding that Hungary is belonging to the Western culture for 1,000 years, not the east. Mesterházy described Orbán's government as a composition of "feudal", "Horthyist" and "Bolshevik" elements. Co-leader of PM Tímea Szabó said that Orbán must be defeated in the upcoming election unless Hungary "will become a Russian colony once and for all". Gordon Bajnai emphasized the outcome of the election will be decided by how many people stay away from voting.

=== Jobbik ===
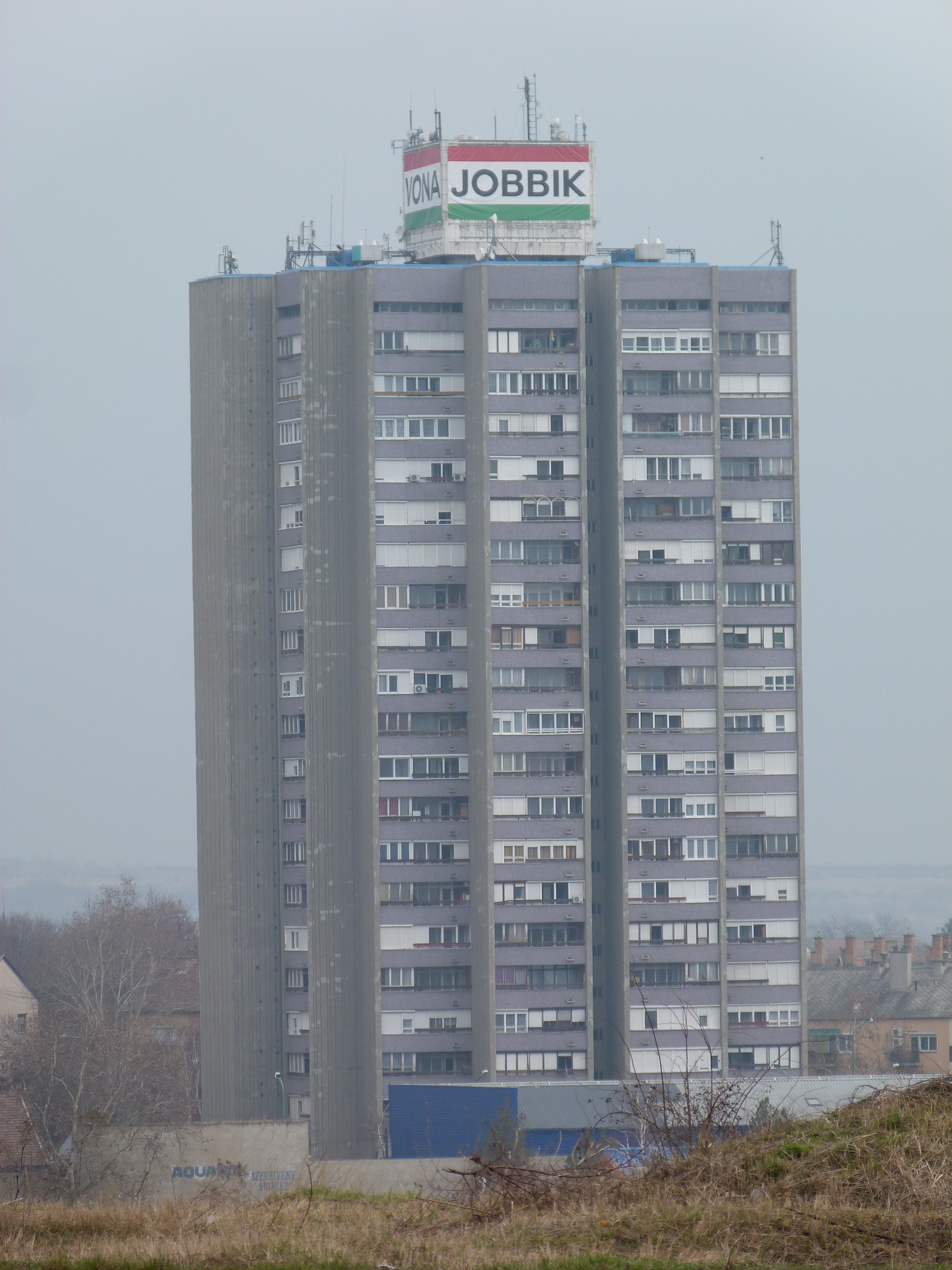
A giant poster at top of an apartment in Gyöngyös, hometown of Gábor Vona

In November 2013, the party leader Gábor Vona, expressed optimism about the election saying that the party planned "no less than election victory in 2014". He argued that Jobbik candidates had been faring well in local elections and that opinion surveys had showed that Jobbik was the most popular party among voters aged under 35. Vona told around 2,000 invited participants at the party's "state of the nation" event on 18 January 2014 in Budapest that Jobbik was ready to govern Hungary. He said the radical nationalist party wants to overthrow the entire 24 year-period since the change of regime not only the current government at the spring general election. The party has prepared its election program dubbed "We'll say it, we'll solve it," which focuses on guaranteeing people a livelihood, safety and order. Vona said his party would initiate a referendum on protecting Hungarian land and on amending Hungary's European Union accession treaty.

On 26 January 2014, Vona held a rally in London's Hyde Park after hundreds of British anti-fascist demonstrators had prevented Jobbik supporters from accessing a location where he originally planned to speak near Holborn tube station. He promised jobs at home to Hungarians living and working in London if his party enters power at the April parliamentary election. He told around 150 people that Jobbik's programme is based on guaranteeing Hungarians a livelihood, maintaining peace and order and calling everyone to account for past deeds. Jobbik has not and will not submit bills that differentiate between citizens based on their ethnicity, he added. Vona sharply criticized the election law for preventing Hungarians living abroad from voting by mail at the parliamentary election.

Jobbik held its campaign launch event in Miskolc on 15 February 2014. Vona told some 4,000 people that if Jobbik wins power, "order will be certainly established within four years". Commenting on "Hungarian–Roma coexistence," he said Jobbik divides society into honorable and dishonorable people and it is not Jobbik's fault that the Roma are "represented more" in the latter group. Spokesperson Dóra Dúró said VAT on basic child care products will be reduced to 5 percent if the party enters government and parents with two or more children will be granted significant tax cuts.

Gábor Vona said on 1 March 2014, Jobbik "will not form a coalition with anyone, no matter what the outcome of the parliamentary election". He told unlike Jobbik, neither ruling Fidesz, nor the main opposition Socialists had come forward with an election manifesto. "This demonstrates that the parties that have won voter trust more than once in the past now expect this to happen again without putting forward a programme", he said.

=== LMP ===
András Schiffer said on 25 January 2014, LMP will field candidates in all 106 individual constituencies at the April general election and the party has the highest number or 22 female candidates. Schiffer said at the two-day party congress that the governing Fidesz gave the wrong answer to the crisis in Hungary. Fidesz strengthened and took to extremes the wrong direction that Hungary chose during its post-communist transformation, he added. Schiffer leads the national list of the LMP in the parliamentary election, said second place Bernadett Szél on 26 January 2014. Since the LMP is preparing to remain an opposition party, it will not nominate a candidate for prime minister, Schiffer said at a press conference during the break of the two-day party congress. When asked about the election chances, the party co-leader expressed his hope that the LMP could get even ten percent of the votes.

According to LMP, Paks expansion proposal is "dangerous" because it involves a "blank cheque" approval and lacks concrete details. Bernadett Szél said LMP essentially disagrees with the "Orbán–Putin pact" and also considers the proposal problematic for procedural reasons. On the day of the vote on the law (6 February 2014), Szél and Katalin Ertsey let off a siren using a megaphone while Schiffer, held up a banner with the slogan "Hungary for sale". Another MP Szilvia Lengyel held a banner up with "We refuse to be a Russian colony" emblazoned on it. As a result Parliament fined the four lawmakers 804,000 Ft (2,600 €).

Schiffer told in February 2014, LMP is "asking for authorization to deliver a green turn" after the election and create crisis-proof jobs, primarily in the most disadvantaged regions of the country. He said "the party wants to break away from the politics practiced by ruling Fidesz and the "pseudo-left", because politics of the past 25 years has produced a crisis instead of jobs and Hungarian society suffers from an extended crisis of employment.

=== Others ===
Modern Hungary Movement (MoMa), founded and led by former Minister of Finance and MEP Lajos Bokros, decided not to participate in the upcoming parliamentary election, because "they do not want to weaken the cooperation of left-wing parties [Unity] with separate candidates." Bokros criticized and resented that his party were excluded from the alliance. On 30 January 2014, Bokros announced that his party would support the opposition alliance on the condition that the parties agree to enact fair election laws and restore the constitutional rule of law once in power. He said that MoMa will start negotiations with the Unity parties before the spring elections. MoMa entered into an agreement with Unity on 19 February 2014 under which Bokros' party would support Unity externally but would not run on the alliance's party list or field individual candidates.

In October 2013, Katalin Szili and her party, the Social Union (SZU) formed an alliance with 11 other parties and civil groups (including Centre Party) under the name Community for Social Justice People's Party (KTI). The new organization seeks to "give a chance to those people who cannot choose from existing parties, including Hungary's nearly 4 million poor whom nobody cares for," Szili said. She also told "there was a tremendous need for a political alternative organised on a democratic and national basis. All political forces are at war with each other, leaving the problems of the impoverished masses unresolved."

On 31 January 2014, the social-democratic and left-wing nationalist 4K! – Fourth Republic! presented its national list for the 2014 election. President András Istvánffy said the "4K! will be the only real new organization in the election, which is not failed politicians' attempt to return to the government." On 8 February 2014, Istvánffy announced the party's election program with the title of "New Social Contract". The program includes the legalization of cannabis, removal of MPs' immunity, re-introduction of multi-rate tax system and concept of social housing system.

Hungarian Social Democrats' Party (Szocdemek) "offers a true, authentic left-wing alternative and seeks to mobilise those who would otherwise stay away from the general election," party leader Andor Schmuck told MTI in January 2014. Asked about his party's absence from the joint list of Unity, Schmuck said that none of the participating parties had given a positive response to the Social Democrats' 15-point proposal for protecting pensioners.

Gábor Kuncze, leader of the Liberal Civil Union (SZPE) decided to participate in the parliamentary election as an individual candidate of the Democratic Coalition (a member party of the Unity) in Szigetszentmiklós constituency. Another ex-SZDSZ member Klára Ungár, the chairperson of the Free People for Hungary – Liberal Party (SZEMA), however, canceled the agreement with E14–PM in January 2014, when Bajnai's party entered into an alliance with MSZP, DK and Liberals and formed Unity.

The legal successor of the Hungarian Democratic Forum (MDF), the Democratic Community of Welfare and Freedom (JESZ) formed in April 2011 and describes itself as conservative and should be placed right of centre on the political spectrum. They called Bokros upon to give up his seat in the European Parliament, though he refused. JESZ held its campaign launch event on 9 February 2014, where leader Zsolt Makay announced 40% wage increase over four years.

== Controversies ==
=== Criticism of the electoral system ===
Mónika Lamperth (MSZP) said the election bill, proposed by János Lázár in October 2011, served no other purpose than to cement Fidesz's power and she called for the bill's withdrawal. She said had the new district map been used in the 2010 election, Fidesz–KDNP would have secured more than 76 percent of seats in parliament (See: Gerrymandering). Jobbik agreed that the law was "tailored to suit Fidesz's needs." They called the new boundary delimitation of constituencies "serious election rigging and manipulation." The fact is formerly it took as twice as many votes to gain a seat in some election districts as in some others.

The opposition criticized the schema that while ethnic Hungarians residing in neighbouring countries are allowed to vote by mail, those employed abroad are unable to do the same. Gergely Karácsony (E14–PM) said that the idea of introducing internet-based vote in the long run should also be considered. Earlier, Karácsony also said that the election campaign financing is tailored to the advantage of Fidesz. He said that it does not solve the region's key problems and does not make campaign financing transparent by, say, opening campaign accounts. He added that it is in the interest of the governing parties that as many candidates as possible run in the elections, in order to create "artificial supply", thereby diluting the voting blocs. The state provides 1 million HUF in budget support to individual candidates in constituencies, and a maximum of almost 600 million HUF to parties that have candidates in all constituencies.

According to the critics, new electoral law had opened the way for the presence of so-called "bogus" or "business parties" whose sole purpose is acquisition of public campaign funds. Heti Válasz reported in February 2014, the two most suspicious "business parties", the New Dimension Party (ÚDP) and the New Hungary Party (ÚMP), are linked to the former MSZP politicians, János Zuschlag (recently released from prison) and Péter Táncsics. These two parties are definitely connected to each other through the person of Táncsics. Both parties were registered at his address in Kőszeg. The two organizations managed to get a lot of signatures and were able to set up national lists. Investigative journalists (e.g. 444.hu) reported that in many cases the small parties changed and copied signatures from each other, and as a result, they collected the required number of approvals before Fidesz. Another method is illustrated by the case of Together 2014 Party. Initially Bajnai's movement would have been an umbrella organization of opposition parties and not a single party, as a result György Tiner (former MSZDP member) appropriated the name and has registered his new party, ahead of Gordon Bajnai's team. American constitutionalist Kim Lane Scheppele wrote "Fidesz politicians refuse to admit that their generosity toward smaller parties served the purpose of confusing voters and weakening the opposition. They proudly point to the democratic nature of the procedure. But the fact that the threshold of parliamentary representation was not lowered from the existing 5% reveals Fidesz's real goal. They didn't want to give small parties a chance to share power with them in parliament. They simply wanted to use them."

The Gypsy Party of Hungary (MCP) protested against the registration of the Roma as a minority at the National Roma Self-government headquarters (ORÖ) in January 2014. The Hungarian Electoral Law requires that voters applying for the autumn minority elections indicate on the registration forms whether they wish to vote on the list of their minority or on the list of the political party in the parliamentary election. It follows that if a Roma is registered as a minority voter, he loses the opportunity to vote for the party list. József Radics, a key member of the MCP, said that they gathered, but crossed out the invalidation of the registration forms instead of signing them, because "they see themselves as Hungarians first and foremost" and they do not want their only choice to vote for a list that is exclusively ORÖ.

=== Alleged frauds ===
The Unity has repeatedly fiercely criticized the preparedness of the National Election Office (NVI). On 18 February 2014, it was said that local election offices in many constituencies had not received official voter notification. According to them, the delay is "unacceptable" and it is a "shameful failure" that the voters did not receive the election notices by the official deadline of February 17. They also accused Fidesz of illegally campaigning in name of the election office, when an online video with the name of NVI encouraged the Hungarian citizens living beyond the border to cast their vote in the election. NVI rejected the call by the opposition Socialists to investigate the video. They told MTI "the video was not made by the NVI; it did not order it and has not been involved in the making of it, and had been unaware of it." On 20 February, Unity told they "no longer trust" the electoral administration system and the preparedness of its staff. Csaba Molnár (DK) said that the electoral agencies had committed a series of mistakes, which he added raised a suspicion of deliberation. As examples, he said that Hungarians in the United States had been given the wrong date, and those living in the United Kingdom the wrong place for the vote, while many in Hungary had not received their election notices in time. Problems with the electronic system have also surfaced, which was denied by NVI head Ilona Pálffy.

On 9 March 2014, Viktor Szigetvári (E14–PM) alleged Fidesz had committed election fraud by circumventing rules on campaign advertising. He told new rules allow commercial broadcasters to air advertisements for political parties only free of charge, thus Hungary's biggest commercial TV channels had abandoned the practice. But while RTL Klub decided that it would not air government ads if it did not broadcast ads for political parties, TV2 decided against airing ads for political parties but is still accommodating government ads, he said. Another Unity politician Róbert Braun earlier alleged that the sale of TV2 to the station's managing director and financial director was a "nefarious and corrupt business." He said it was suspected that the buyers intended to pay off the loan they used to make the acquisition with revenue from state advertising. A spokesman for the channel dismissed the allegations. On 18 March, the Curia, Hungary's supreme court, ruled that TV2 broke the election law by airing government information advert. TV2 said it respected the Curia's decision but did not agree with its judgement that the broadcast of the government's "advert for social purposes" had broken the law. The broadcaster argued that it was not legally obliged to check the contents of ads for social purposes.

=== Political scandals ===
The online edition of daily Magyar Nemzet said that Mesterházy made comments in his 25 January speech about Lőrinc Mészáros, the mayor of Felcsút, calling him "Orbán's procurator, who has multiplied his company's revenues five times over the past three years and today ranks as the 88th richest Hungarian". As Mesterházy described Mészáros' as "a serious achievement that deserves a university professor's post," the online report said participants shouted the word "rope," suggesting that the mayor would deserve that instead. It added that instead of distancing himself from the slogan, Mesterházy continued his address as saying that "I believe there is going to be not a professor's podium, but the other thing we have just heard." Máté Kocsis accused Mesterházy of lying when he denied what happened and called on the opposition leader to admit the truth and extend an apology to Hungarians.

Magyar Nemzet reported on 4 February 2014, Gábor Simon, deputy chairman of MSZP has undeclared assets (€770,000 ) held in an Austrian bank account. The paper added that Simon's earlier asset declarations did not contain these amounts and there is no indication of their origin. After initiative of the MSZP, Simon suspended his party membership and all positions he held within the party. Simon said the source of money, which was related to his own personal affairs, had no origin in public life and no political aspect, however his new asset declaration had failed to answer questions. Fidesz member Antal Rogán told that the only logical explanation for why Simon "failed to find the right box in the form where his funds had to be listed" is that the "mysterious millions held in Austria are not his money, but funds he kept for the Socialist Party." Bernadett Budai, the MSZP's spokesperson said her party or other political organisations have neither means nor authority to investigate in connection with Simon's assets. Simon was arrested on charges of forgery on 10 March 2014, when another assumed crimes were revealed. Nézőpont pollster reported voter support of Unity fell from 24 percent in January to 18 percent in February, likely dented by the Simon corruption case. Heti Világgazdaság wrote Fidesz has two more confusing and suspicious case to weaken the Unity's positions.

In late February 2014, Ministry of the Interior published two redacted secret-service reports into Ferenc Gyurcsány's speech in Balatonőszöd in May 2006, which caused serious riots in autumn 2006. Accordingly, they raise the possibility that some Socialist politicians and Gyurcsány himself were behind the leak. Gyurcsány accused minister Sándor Pintér of manipulating the evidence, and, "worse, of lying". Mesterházy called on the government to stop using the secret services for campaign purposes, and to bring the entire report into the open instead of a "distorted" version of it. Fidesz MP Máté Kocsis told a news conference that Gyurcsány had "lied about his lies speech". Later Gyurcsány claimed that Fidesz had prepared the riots that started in September 2006. He noted that excerpts released from secret service reports indicate that a recording of his speech ended up in Fidesz hands shortly before it was leaked to the media.

On 6 March 2014, János Zuschlag, a former Socialist MP who was recently released from prison for graft after six years, claimed in a new book that he was paid off by MSZP party leaders in 2006 to not run for parliament after resigning in 2004 over a Holocaust joke at an official commemoration. Later he was given a prison sentence of six years by a county court for siphoning off state funds totalling around 75 million forints (EUR 242,000) and channeling them into the Socialist party's youth organisations. Zuschlag told Napi Gazdaság that then-youth minister Gyurcsány and then-state secretary Mesterházy had known about misdeeds in his office. The opposition Socialist Party and Democratic Coalition both denied the accusations as false. Zsolt Gréczy, a spokesman for the DK, told MTI that "a criminal" had been interviewed by the head of a research institute close to the Fidesz, Gábor G. Fodor, which was a "strange" attempt at credibility. Gabriella Selmeczi said Fidesz "awaits answers to the questions raised in the Zuschlag interview".

== Candidates ==
=== Registered parties ===
Abbreviation	Party name	Native name
–	The Homeland Not For Sale Movement Party	A Haza Nem Eladó Mozgalom Párt
A Válasz	The Answer Party	A Válasz Párt
AQP	Aquila Party	Aquila Párt
Centrum	Centre Party	Centrum Párt
DK	Democratic Coalition	Demokratikus Koalíció
E14	Together – Party for a New Era	Együtt – A Korszakváltók Pártja
Egyiksem	Solution: NEITHER! Civil Control Party	Megoldás: EGYIKSEM! Civilkontroll párt
Együtt 2014	Together 2014 Party	Együtt 2014 Párt
Élőlánc	Human Chain for Hungary	Élőlánc Magyarországért
ÉMP	Party for Livable Hungary	Élhető Magyarországért Párt
EP	Party of Dissatisfied People	Elégedetlenek Pártja
ÉPÉSZ	Political Interest Reconciliation Association of Value-creating People – Centre Party	Értékteremtők Politikai Érdekvédelmi Szövetsége – A Közép Pártja
EU.ROM	Democratic Party for the Welfare of European Roma Christians	Európai Roma Keresztények Jobblétéért Demokratikus Párt
European Left	Workers' Party of Hungary 2006	Magyarországi Munkáspárt 2006
Fidesz	Fidesz – Hungarian Civic Union	Fidesz – Magyar Polgári Szövetség
FKGP	Independent Smallholders, Agrarian Workers and Civic Party	Független Kisgazda-, Földmunkás- és Polgári Párt
FP	New Independent Party	Új Független Párt
Greens	Party of Greens	Zöldek Pártja
HATMAP	Party of Cross-border Hungarians	Határon túli Magyarok Pártja
HMP	Hungarian Party of Reconstruction	Helyreállítás Magyarországi Pártja
Idealists	Alliance of Hungarian Idealists	Magyar Idealisták Szövetsége
JESZ	Democratic Community of Welfare and Freedom	Jólét és Szabadság Demokrata Közösség
Jobbik	Jobbik – Movement for a Better Hungary	Jobbik Magyarországért Mozgalom
–	Pirate Party	Kalózpárt
KDNP	Christian Democratic People's Party	Kereszténydemokrata Néppárt
–	Smallholders' Party	Kisgazdapárt
KMSZ	Alliance of Christian Hungarians	Keresztény Magyarok Szövetsége
KTI	Community for Social Justice People's Party	Közösség a Társadalmi Igazságosságért Néppárt
LMP	Politics Can Be Different	Lehet Más a Politika
MACSEP	Hungarian Action Party	Magyar Cselekvő Párt
MAJP	Party of Hungary's Future	Magyarország Jövője Párt
MAMA	Hungarians for Hungary Party	Magyarok Magyarországért Párt
MCF	MCF Romani Alliance Party	MCF Roma Összefogás Párt
MCP	Gypsy Party of Hungary	Magyarországi Cigánypárt
MDU	Hungarian Democratic Union	Magyar Demokratikus Unió
–	For Renewal of Hungary	Magyarország Megújulásáért
MGP	Hungarian Economy Party	Magyar Gazdaság Párt
MIÉP	Hungarian Justice and Life Party	Magyar Igazság és Élet Pártja
MKSZU	Hungarian Christian Social Union	Magyar Keresztény Szociális Unió
MLP	Hungarian Liberal Party	Magyar Liberális Párt
MMRÖP	Renewed Hungarian Romani Alliance Party	Megújult Magyarországi Roma Összefogás Párt
MNP	Hungarian National Party	Magyar Nemzeti Párt
MNRP	Hungarian National Order Party	Magyar Nemzeti Rend Párt
MRPP	Hungarian Republican Political Party	Magyar Republikánus Politikai Párt
MSZDP	Hungarian Social Democratic Party	Magyarországi Szociáldemokrata Párt
MSZP	Hungarian Socialist Party	Magyar Szocialista Párt
–	Hungarian Workers' Party	Magyar Munkáspárt
–	Party for National Interest	Nemzeti Érdekért Párt
–	National Revolutionary Party	Nemzeti Forradalmi Párt
NÉP	National Value Party	Nemzeti Értékelvű Párt
NOP	Party on People's Side	Nép Oldali Párt
ÖP	Unity Party	Összefogás Párt
PM	Dialogue for Hungary	Párbeszéd Magyarországért
Realist Party	Hungarian Realist Unity and Peace Party	Magyar Realista Egység és Béke Párt
–	Order, Freedom, Welfare Party	Rend, Szabadság, Jólét Párt
SEM	Party for a Fit and Healthy Hungary	Sportos és Egészséges Magyarországért Párt
SMS	Alliance of Mária Seres	Seres Mária Szövetségesei
Social Democrats	Hungarian Social Democrats' Party	Magyar Szociáldemokraták Pártja
SZAVA	Party of Free Voters	Szabad Választók Pártja
SZDP	Social Democratic Party	Szociáldemokrata Párt
SZAVA	Party of Free Voters	Szabad Választók Pártja
SZEM–Women's Party	In Alliance, Together for Hungary	Szövetségben, Együtt Magyarországért
SZMP	Party of Free Hungarians	Szabad Magyarok Pártja
Társ. Party	Social Contract Party	Társadalmi Szerződés Párt
TBP	Social Peace Party	Társadalmi Béke Párt
TEMPO	Party for Hungary with Clean Energy	Tiszta Energiával Magyarországért Párt
ÚDP	New Dimension Party	Új Dimenzió Párt
ÚGP	New Generations' Party	Új Generációk Pártja
ÚMP	New Hungary Party	Új Magyarország Párt
VSZ	Entrepreneurs' Alliance for the Reforms	Vállalkozók Szövetsége a Reformokért
ZCP	Green Centre Party	Zöld Centrum Párt
ZM	Green Movement	Zöld Mozgalom
4K!	4K! – Fourth Republic!	Negyedik Köztársaság Párt

=== Individual candidates ===
The National Election Office announced that a total of 2,304 candidates submitted the required number of nominations for the parliamentary election by the 3 p.m. deadline on 4 March. The candidacy of 1,531 people was accepted after completion of the registration process. The following table contains a selected list of numbers of individual candidates by county representation and party affiliation:

Individual candidates
County	Seats	Fidesz-KDNP	Unity	Jobbik	LMP	SD	JESZ	SMS	HNEM	ÖP	KTI	FKGP	MP
Budapest	18	18	18	18	18	12	15	8	3	7	9	5	5
Baranya	4	4	4	4	4	4	4	3	4	3	4	3	1
Bács-Kiskun	6	6	6	6	6	5	3	3	1	2	6	0	1
Békés	4	4	4	4	4	3	1	3	4	4	1	0	3
Borsod-Abaúj-Zemplén	7	7	7	7	7	7	5	4	7	6	2	7	6
Csongrád	4	4	4	4	4	2	0	1	4	0	2	3	1
Fejér	5	5	5	5	5	5	4	3	1	1	5	2	2
Győr-Moson-Sopron	5	5	5	5	5	4	5	3	0	2	1	0	2
Hajdú-Bihar	6	6	6	6	6	6	6	5	4	4	1	1	0
Heves	3	3	3	3	3	3	0	2	2	3	2	2	0
Jász-Nagykun-Szolnok	4	4	4	4	4	4	4	4	4	2	1	4	4
Komárom-Esztergom	3	3	3	3	3	0	3	0	2	3	2	1	1
Nógrád	2	2	2	2	2	2	2	2	2	1	2	2	2
Pest	12	12	12	12	12	10	10	9	9	8	6	5	1
Somogy	4	4	4	4	4	3	4	4	4	2	3	4	1
Szabolcs-Szatmár-Bereg	6	6	6	6	6	6	6	6	6	6	4	4	3
Tolna	3	3	3	3	3	2	0	2	3	0	2	2	0
Vas	3	3	3	3	3	1	3	2	1	1	2	2	0
Veszprém	4	4	4	4	4	2	4	0	3	3	1	0	0
Zala	3	3	3	3	3	1	2	3	2	1	1	3	0
All	106	106	106	106	106	82	81	67	66	59	57	50	33

=== National lists ===
Under the new election law, parties which ran individual candidates in at least 27 constituencies in Budapest and at least nine counties had the opportunity to set up a national list. On 21 February 2014, the National Election Committee (NVB) registered at first the joint list of the governing Fidesz–KDNP party alliance, led by PM Viktor Orbán and KDNP president Zsolt Semjén.

Eighteen national party lists were registered up to 8 March 2014, when the National Election Office (NVI) approved the following 14 organizations (parties and electoral alliances), in addition to the parliamentary parties (Fidesz–KDNP, Unity, Jobbik and LMP), which had already successfully registered: Homeland Not For Sale Movement Party (HNEM), the communist Hungarian Workers' Party, Party for a Fit and Healthy Hungary (SEM), Andor Schmuck's Social Democratic Civic Party (Soc Dems), the former long-time parliamentary party Independent Smallholders, Agrarian Workers and Civic Party (FKGP), former House Speaker and Socialist party member Katalin Szili's Community for Social Justice People's Party (KTI), Gypsy Party of Hungary (MCP), Party of Greens (Greens), New Dimension Party (ÚDP), New Hungary Party (ÚMP), Together 2014 Party, Democratic Community of Welfare and Freedom (JESZ), Unity Party (ÖP) and Alliance of Mária Seres (SMS). The following table contains only the incumbent parliamentary parties' national lists (first 20 members), which won mandates in the election:

Party (national) lists
Fidesz-KDNP (279)	Unity (198)	Jobbik (203)	LMP (132)
1. Viktor Orbán (Fidesz); 2. Zsolt Semjén (KDNP); 3. László Kövér (Fidesz); 4. Márta Mátrai (Fidesz); 5. Mihály Varga (Fidesz); 6. Lajos Kósa (Fidesz); 7. János Lázár (Fidesz); 8. Antal Rogán (Fidesz); 9. Tibor Navracsics (Fidesz); 10. Péter Harrach (KDNP); 11. Sándor Lezsák (Fidesz); 12. István Jakab (Fidesz); 13. Balázs Győrffy (Fidesz); 14. Béla Turi-Kovács (Fidesz); 15. Kristóf Szatmáry (Fidesz); 16. Péter Ágh (Fidesz); 17. Flórián Farkas (Fidesz); 18. Sándor Fazekas (Fidesz); 19. Zoltán Balog (Fidesz); 20. Csaba Hende (Fidesz)	1. Attila Mesterházy (MSZP); 2. Gordon Bajnai (E14); 3. Ferenc Gyurcsány (DK); 4. Gábor Fodor (MLP); 5. Tímea Szabó (PM); 6. László Botka (MSZP); 7. József Tóbiás (MSZP); 8. Nándor Gúr (MSZP); 9. Tamás Harangozó (MSZP); 10. Zsolt Molnár (MSZP); 11. Zoltán Lukács (MSZP); 12. István Hiller (MSZP); 13. Ágnes Kunhalmi (MSZP); 14. Árpád Velez (MSZP); 15. László Szakács (MSZP); 16. Péter Kónya (E14); 17. Lajos Korózs (MSZP); 18. Zsolt Legény (MSZP); 19. Csaba Molnár (DK); 20. Ildikó Bangó-Borbély (MSZP)	1. Gábor Vona; 2. Zoltán Balczó; 3. János Volner; 4. Dóra Dúró; 5. Tamás Sneider; 6. Dániel Z. Kárpát; 7. Márton Gyöngyösi; 8. Csaba Gyüre; 9. Gergely Farkas; 10. Enikő Hegedűs; 11. Előd Novák; 12. Ádám Mirkóczki; 13. György Szilágyi; 14. István Apáti; 15. István Szávay; 16. Gábor Staudt; 17. Zoltán Magyar; 18. Tibor Bana; 19. Zsolt Egyed; 20. Balázs Ander	1. András Schiffer; 2. Bernadett Szél; 3. István Ikotity; 4. Róbert Benedek Sallai; 5. Erzsébet Schmuck; 6. László Lóránt Keresztes; 7. Ferenc Gerstmár; 8. Szilvia Lengyel; 9. Ákos Csarnó; 10. László Moldován; 11. Andrea Gecsei-Tóth; 12. Kálmán Tibor Kiss; 13. Lajos Mile; 14. Mária Hajdu; 15. Tamás Jakabfy; 16. János Barta; 17. Judit Rákosi; 18. Ernő Pető; 19. Péter Takács; 20. Katalin Csiba

=== Minority lists ===
Under the election law, the thirteen officially recognized national minorities are entitled to send minority spokespersons (Hungarian: nemzetiségi szószólók) to the National Assembly. They have the same rights as other parliamentarians to address the parliament, but are not entitled to vote. However the minorities could also each set up national lists. If any such national list reached the 5% electoral threshold from minority votes, this would entitle them to full-fledged representatives.

The Polish minority list was the first minority list to be successfully registered by the National Election Committee (NVB), on 25 February 2014. Two days later, on 27 February, the NVB registered three other national lists: those for the German, Rusyn and Serb minorities, and then approved the lists of Armenians and Romanians on 1 March, Bulgarians and Slovaks on 3 March, Croats, Ukrainians and Romani people on 4 March, and, finally, Greeks and Slovenes on 7 March.

The officially recognized minority self-government organizations received a total of 298.5 million Ft (EUR 954,000) of public support for campaign activity. The National Roma Council was awarded a significant portion of the funds – altogether 101 million forints – while the Bulgarians granted the lowest amount (8.4 million), according to official demographic ratios.

== Opinion polls ==
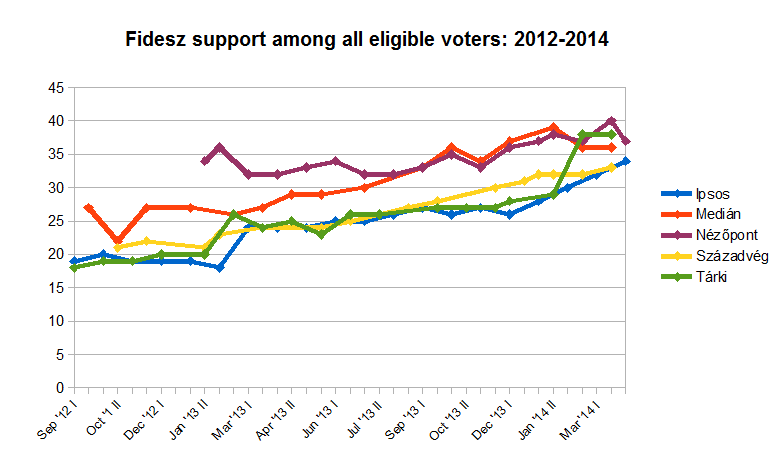
This chart illustrates the level of support for the Hungarian government party Fidesz among all eligible voters, as measured by the five polling institutions regularly conducting polling in Hungary, over the year 2013. Since many eligible Hungarian voters expressed no preference for any political party at all, these numbers are significantly lower than those for Fidesz support among decided voters.

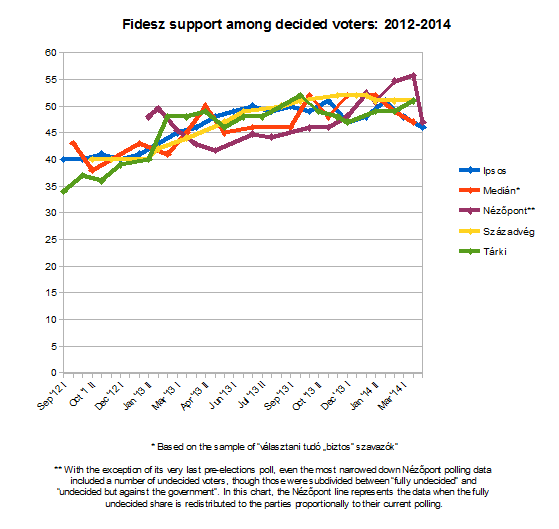
This chart illustrates the level of support for the Hungarian government party Fidesz among decided voters, as measured by the five polling institutions regularly conducting polling in Hungary, over the year 2013. Please note the information in the footnotes about the selection and calculation of the Medián and Nézőpont numbers.

Methodological note: The Hungarian pollsters generally release separate data on the support of political parties among all eligible voters (which tends to include a high percentage for "don't know/no preference"), and on the support of political parties among "active" or "certain" voters. The table below refers to the latter data. (Note: In addition, confusingly, two pollsters even publish parallel data on "active" or "certain" voters. Thus, Medián publishes different numbers for the categories of "választani tudók" and "választani tudó "biztos" szavazók", though they do not tend to differ much – the data in the table here generally refers to the latter. Tárki's polling releases always highlight results about "A pártok támogatottsága a pártválasztók körében", and those are included in the table here (and can be reviewed further back into time in this database on their website), but their website also provides a separate database with somewhat different polling data on "A pártok támogatottságának alakulása a biztos szavazó pártválasztók körében". Finally, in February 2013 Nézőpont switched to a system in which it distinguishes between "the entire population" and "active voters", but even the "active voters" sample always includes a percentage of those who are "undecided but favour a change in government" and a percentage of those who are "undecided altogether". Those numbers are given in the footnotes for each Nézőpont poll in the table.)

Institute	Publication date	Survey dates	Fidesz–KDNP	MSZP	Jobbik	LMP	DK	E14–PM	Unity	Others
2010 election	11 & 25 April 2010		52.7%	19.3%	16.7%	7.5%	–	–	–	4.0%
Ipsos	20 September 2012	9 September 2012- 16 September 2012	40%	32%	17%	5%	4%	–	–	3%
Medián	27 September 2012	14 September 2012- 18 September 2012	43%	28%	15%	7%	6%	–	–	1%
Medián	October 2012		41%	28%	18%	6%	5%	–	–	2% (Note: Includes 1% for 4K! – Fourth Republic!.)
Ipsos	October 2012		40%	33%	15%	6%	4%	–	–	2%
Századvég	31 October 2012	24 October 2012- 29 October 2012	40%	29%	19%	7%	3%	–	–	2%
Ipsos	November 2012		41%	31%	17%	7%	3%	–	–	2%
Századvég	30 November 2012	26 November 2012- 29 November 2012	40%	27%	18%	5%	3%	–	–	7%
Ipsos	17 December 2012	4 December 2012- 11 December 2012	40%	32%	14%	6%	2%	–	–	6%
Medián	18 December 2012	23 November 2012- 27 November 2012	40%	19%	18%	3%	3%	16%	–	1%
Ipsos	22 January 2013		41%	32%	12%	5%	3%	8%	–	0%
Medián	23 January 2013	11 January 2013- 15 January 2013	43%	27%	15%	6%	2%	7%	–	0%
Tárki	30 January 2013	17 January 2013- 22 January 2013	40%	28%	16%	6%	2%	6%	–	1%
Századvég	3 February 2013		40%	29%	18%	5%	–	7%	–	1%
Nézőpont	4 February 2013	22 January 2013- 25 January 2013	48%	18%	15%	2%	4%	12%	–	1%
Nézőpont (Note: This poll has 20% undecideds, of which 10% fully undecided and 10% undecided but in favour of a change in government.)	14 February 2013	4 February 2013- 7 February 2013	44%	13%	12%	2%	1%	7%	–	1%
Ipsos	18 February 2013	7 February 2013- 14 February 2013	43%	28%	16%	6%	2%	–	–	6%
Századvég	18 February 2013		42%	29%	17%	4%	–	6%	–	2%
Tárki	27 February 2013	13 February 2013- 20 February 2013	48%	22%	16%	3%	1%	9%	–	1%
Medián	28 February 2013	15 February 2013- 19 February 2013	41%	17%	19%	2%	4%	15%	–	2%
Nézőpont (Note: This poll has 17% undecideds, of which 9% fully undecided and 8% undecided but in favour of a change in government.)	13 March 2013	4 March 2013- 8 March 2013	41%	15%	12%	5%	1%	7%	–	2%
Ipsos	18 March 2013	8 March 2013- 14 March 2013	45%	27%	14%	3%	2%	9%	–	0%
Tárki	27 March 2013	14 March 2013- 18 March 2013	48%	18%	16%	3%	3%	11%	–	1%
Századvég	29 March 2013	25 March 2013- 27 March 2013	44%	28%	15%	3%	1%	8%	–	1%
Medián	3 April 2013	22 March 2013- 26 March 2013	45%	24%	17%	2%	2%	8%	–	1%
Nézőpont (Note: This poll has 15% undecideds, of which 6% fully undecided and 9% undecided but in favour of a change in government.)	10 April 2013	2 April 2013- 5 April 2013	40%	15%	14%	5%	1%	9%	–	1%
Ipsos	18 April 2013	9 April 2013- 15 April 2013	46%	26%	14%	3%	1%	8%	–	1%
Tárki	24 April 2013	11 April 2013- 17 April 2013	49%	21%	17%	3%	2%	7%	–	1%
Medián	6 May 2013	19 April 2013- 23 April 2013	50%	17%	17%	2%	2%	11%	–	1%
Nézőpont (Note: This poll has 13% undecideds, of which 6% fully undecided and 7% undecided but in favour of a change in government.)	15 May 2013	6 May 2013- 10 May 2013	39%	16%	13%	6%	1%	10%	–	2%
Ipsos	16 May 2013	6 May 2013- 13 May 2013	48%	26%	14%	2%	1%	7%	–	1%
Tárki	29 May 2013	15 May 2013- 21 May 2013	46%	22%	15%	4%	3%	10%	–	0%
Századvég	31 May 2013	25 May 2013- 27 May 2013	47%	25%	13%	2%	1%	10%	–	2%
Medián	5 June 2013	24 May 2013- 28 May 2013	45%	23%	15%	3%	4%	10%	–	0%
Ipsos	18 June 2013	8 June 2013- 15 June 2013	49%	27%	12%	2%	2%	8%	–	1%
Századvég	24 June 2013	17 June 2013- 20 June 2013	49%	24%	13%	3%	1%	8%	–	2%
Tárki	26 June 2013	12 June 2013- 21 June 2013	48%	24%	13%	5%	2%	7%	–	1%
Nézőpont (Note: This poll has 20.6% undecideds, of which 11.6% fully undecided and 9% undecided but in favour of a change in government.)	11 July 2013	1 July 2013- 4 July 2013	39%	13%	12%	4%	0.4%	11%	–	0%
Ipsos	16 July 2013	6 July 2013- 13 July 2013	50%	27%	12%	2%	2%	7%	–	1%
Medián	21 July 2013	5 July 2013- 9 July 2013	46%	20%	14%	3%	3%	12%	–	2%
Tárki	24 July 2013	10 July 2013- 17 July 2013	48%	20%	15%	3%	4%	8%	–	2%
Nézőpont (Note: This poll has 26% undecideds, of which 12% fully undecided and 14% undecided but in favour of a change in government.)	14 August 2013	6 August 2013- 10 August 2013	38%	12%	10%	5%	1%	8%	–	0%
Ipsos	15 August 2013	6 August 2013- 13 August 2013	49%	26%	12%	3%	2%	6%	–	2%
Századvég	4 September 2013	23 August 2013- 28 August 2013	50%	23%	13%	3%	1%	8%	–	3%
Nézőpont (Note: This poll has a separate share of undecideds, which Nézőpont usually breaks down between those fully undecided and those undecided but in favour of a change in government. This month that data does not appear to have been published though, but a total of 26% must have fallen in those two categories or expressed support for DK or the smallest parties ("Others").)	11 September 2013	2 September 2013- 6 September 2013	40%	12%	11%	4%	?%	7%	–	?%
Ipsos	17 September 2013	6 September 2013- 13 September 2013	50%	25%	11%	4%	3%	5%	–	2%
Tárki	25 September 2013	11 September 2013- 19 September 2013	52%	20%	16%	3%	4%	6%	–	0%
Medián	26 September 2013	6 September 2013- 10 September 2013	46%	23%	15%	2%	5%	8%	–	1%
Századvég	4 October 2013	25 September 2013- 30 September 2013	51%	23%	14%	2%	3%	6%	–	1%
Nézőpont (Note: This poll has 17% undecideds, of which 10% fully undecided and 7% undecided but in favour of a change in government. In addition, this time the Nézőpont poll also provides data for "potenciális szavazók", which add up to 100%, leaving no number of undecided voters. The proportions are substantively different in this data, to the advantage of the MSzP: Fidesz 44%, MSzP 25%, Jobbik 14%, LMP 6%, DK 3%, E2014 7%.)	16 October 2013	7 October 2013- 10 October 2013	41%	13%	12%	6%	3%	7%	–	1%
Ipsos	17 October 2013	7 October 2013- 14 October 2013	49%	28%	11%	1%	4%	5%	–	1%
Tárki	30 October 2013	16 October 2013- 23 October 2013	49%	20%	13%	3%	5%	9%	–	1%
Medián	30 October 2013	11 October 2013- 16 October 2013	52%	21%	13%	2%	4%	7%	–	1%
Nézőpont (Note: This poll has 18% undecideds, of which 10% fully undecided and 8% undecided but in favour of a change in government. In addition, this time the Nézopont poll also provides data for "potenciális szavazók", which add up to 100%, leaving no number of undecided voters. The proportions are substantively different in this data, to the advantage of the MSzP and E2014: Fidesz 42%, MSzP 23%, Jobbik 13%, LMP 6%, DK 4%, E2014 10%, Others 2%.)	13 November 2013	4 November 2013- 8 November 2013	41%	13%	11%	6%	3%	6%	–	2%
Ipsos	18 November 2013	7 November 2013- 14 November 2013	51%	26%	13%	2%	3%	4%	–	2%
Medián	20 November 2013	8 November 2013- 12 November 2013	48%	21%	16%	3%	6%	6%	–	2%
Századvég	22 November 2013	17 November 2013- 19 November 2013	52%	24%	12%	3%	4%	4%	–	1%
Tárki	27 November 2013	14 November 2013- 20 November 2013	48%	20%	13%	3%	6%	9%	–	1%
Nézőpont (Note: This poll has 21% undecideds, of which 16% fully undecided and 5% undecided but in favour of a change in government.)	12 December 2013	2 December 2013- 6 December 2013	40%	12%	11%	4%	4%	7%	–	1%
Medián	18 December 2013	6 December 2013- 10 December 2013	52%	18%	14%	1%	6%	8%	–	1%
Ipsos	18 December 2013	7 December 2013- 14 December 2013	47%	27%	12%	2%	3%	6%	–	3%
Tárki	19 December 2013	4 December 2013- 11 December 2013	47%	19%	14%	4%	7%	7%	–	1%
Századvég	20 December 2013	16 December 2013- 19 December 2013	52%	23%	13%	2%	4%	4%	–	2% (Note: Includes 1% for Hungarian Liberal Party.)
Ipsos	15 January 2014	6 January 2014- 13 January 2014	48%	27%	11%	3%	5%	5%	–	2%
Századvég	15 January 2014	10 January 2014- 12 January 2014	52%	21%	14%	3%	4%	5%	–	1%
Nézőpont (Note: This poll has 14% undecideds, of which 12% fully undecided and 2% undecided but in favour of a change in government.)	15 January 2014	6 January 2014- 9 January 2014	46%	10%	10%	3%	6%	9%	–	2%
Tárki	29 January 2014	15 January 2014- 22 January 2014	49%	23%	14%	2%	6%	6%	–	1%
Századvég	29 January 2014	26 January 2014- 28 January 2014	51%	–	14%	6%	–	–	28%	1%
Nézőpont (Note: This poll has 14% undecideds, of which 9% fully undecided and 5% undecided but in favour of a change in government.)	30 January 2014	20 January 2014- 25 January 2014	46%	–	9%	4%	–	–	26%	1%
Medián	4 February 2014	24 January 2014- 28 January 2014	52%	–	14%	2%	–	–	30%	2%
Ipsos	13 February 2014	1 February 2014- 9 February 2014	51%	–	13%	2%	–	–	33%	1%
Tárki	26 February 2014	12 February 2014- 18 February 2014	49%	–	19%	6%	–	–	27%	1%
Nézőpont (Note: This poll had 20% undecideds, of which 13% were fully undecided and 7% were undecided but in favour of a change in government. The figures presented represent decided voters.)	27 February 2014	17 February 2014- 20 February 2014	59%	–	15%	3%	–	–	22%	1%
Medián	5 March 2014	21 February 2014- 25 February 2014	49%	–	18%	3%	–	–	30%	0%
Századvég	7 March 2014	26 February 2014- 28 February 2014	51%	–	16%	5%	–	–	27%	1%
Ipsos	13 March 2014	4 March 2014- 10 March 2014	48%	–	15%	4%	–	–	31%	2%
Tárki	26 March 2014	12 March 2014- 19 March 2014	51%	–	20%	6%	–	–	21%	2%
Nézőpont (Note: This poll had 19% undecideds, of which 13% were fully undecided and 6% undecided but in favour of a change in government. The figures presented represent decided voters.)	26 March 2014	17 March 2014- 19 March 2014	59%	–	14%	2%	–	–	23%	1%
Századvég	31 March 2014	27 March 2014- 30 March 2014	51%	–	18%	5%	–	–	25%	1%
Medián (Note: In addition to its polling data, Median provided a forecast for the election results: Fidesz/KDNP 38-44%; Unity 26-32%; Jobbik 21-25%; LMP 3-5%. See http://median.hu/object.cd804c1b-7e19-4376-ac97-b8089b67b753.ivy)	3 April 2014	21 March 2014- 25 March 2014	47%	–	21%	3%	–	–	23%	0%
Nézőpont (Note: This polling data does not include the "active voters" category which Nezopont used (and this table reflected) since February 2013. It only has data for "the entire population", with 27% undecideds and non-voters, and for "potential voters", with no undecideds at all. This table therefore uses the latter data.)	3 April 2014	31 March 2014- 2 April 2014	47%	–	19%	5%	–	–	28%	1%
Ipsos (Note: In addition to this polling data for decided voters, Ipsos provided a forecast for the election results: Fidesz/KDNP 40-45%; Unity 26-31%; Jobbik 19-23%; LMP 4-6%.)	5 April 2014	28 March 2014- 3 April 2014	46%	–	19%	4%	–	–	26%	

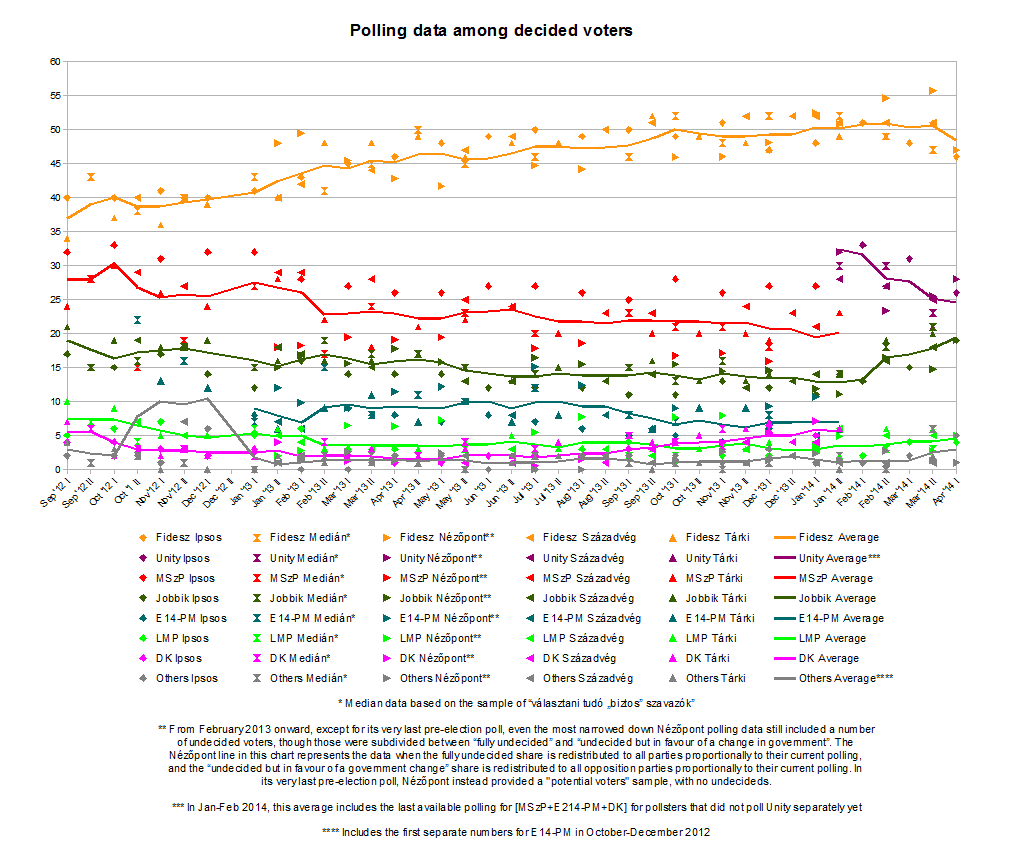
Support for the main Hungarian political parties among decided voters, as measured by the five regular polling institutions. Please note the clarifications about the selection and calculation of the Medián and Nézőpont data, and the calculation of the Unity average for the first month.

== Results ==
Turnout
7:00	9:00	11:00	13:00	15:00	17:30	Overall
1.64%	9.5%	23.23%	34.33%	45.02%	56.77%	61.73%

Party	Party-list			Constituency			Total seats	+/–
Party	Votes	%	Seats	Votes	%	Seats	Total seats	+/–
Fidesz–KDNP	2,264,780	44.87	37	2,165,342	44.11	96	133	–130
Unity (Note: MSZP, Együtt–PM, DK, MLP.)	1,290,806	25.57	28	1,317,879	26.85	10	38	–21
Jobbik	1,020,476	20.22	23	1,000,637	20.39	0	23	–24
Politics Can Be Different	269,414	5.34	5	244,191	4.97	0	5	–11
Hungarian Workers' Party	28,323	0.56	0	12,712	0.26	0	0	0
Homeland Not For Sale Movement	23,507	0.47	0	23,037	0.47	0	0	New
Alliance of Mária Seres	22,219	0.44	0	20,229	0.41	0	0	0
Party of Greens	18,557	0.37	0	9,392	0.19	0	0	New
Social Democratic Hungarian Civic Party	15,073	0.30	0	12,232	0.25	0	0	New
Together 2014 (Note: A party with similar name but operating separately from Together, which ran as part of Unity.)	14,085	0.28	0	6,361	0.13	0	0	New
Party for a Sporty and Healthy Hungary	12,563	0.25	0	11,746	0.24	0	0	New
National Self-Government of Germans	11,415	0.23	0				0	New
Community for Social Justice People's Party	10,969	0.22	0	10,551	0.21	0	0	New
Democratic Community of Welfare and Freedom	9,925	0.20	0	13,051	0.27	0	0	New
Gypsy Party of Hungary	8,810	0.17	0	9,030	0.18	0	0	New
Independent Smallholders Party	8,083	0.16	0	7,175	0.15	0	0	0
Unity Party	6,552	0.13	0	6,887	0.14	0	0	0
National Self-Government of Roma	4,048	0.08	0				0	New
New Dimension Party	2,100	0.04	0	1,706	0.03	0	0	New
New Hungary Party	1,578	0.03	0	2,018	0.04	0	0	New
National Self-Government of Croatians	1,212	0.02	0				0	New
National Self-Government of Slovaks	995	0.02	0				0	New
National Self-Government of Ruthenians	463	0.01	0				0	New
National Self-Government of Romanians	362	0.01	0				0	New
National Self-Government of Ukrainians	293	0.01	0				0	New
National Self-Government of Serbs	236	0.00	0				0	New
National Self-Government of Slovenes	134	0.00	0				0	New
National Self-Government of Armenians	110	0.00	0				0	New
Hungarian Greeks	102	0.00	0				0	New
National Self-Government of Poles	99	0.00	0				0	New
National Self-Government of Bulgarians	74	0.00	0				0	New
ÉLŐLÁNC				3,328	0.07	0	0	New
Independent Smallholders–Justice and Life Party				2,054	0.04	0	0	–
4K! – Fourth Republic!				1,897	0.04	0	0	New
MGP				1,534	0.03	0	0	New
EP				1,362	0.03	0	0	New
Social Democratic Party				1,058	0.02	0	0	New
Social Democratic Party of Hungary				937	0.02	0	0	0
SZEM-NŐPÁRT				840	0.02	0	0	New
TEMPO				831	0.02	0	0	New
MDU				762	0.02	0	0	New
NEMZETI ÉRDEKÉRT				683	0.01	0	0	New
Democratic Party for the Betterment of European Roma Christians				637	0.01	0	0	New
MACSEP				612	0.01	0	0	New
KMSZ				581	0.01	0	0	New
MCF				540	0.01	0	0	New
MRPP				462	0.01	0	0	New
Nemzeti Forr.Párt				448	0.01	0	0	New
Workers' Party of Hungary 2006 – European Left				390	0.01	0	0	New
MKSZU				372	0.01	0	0	New
SZMP				364	0.01	0	0	New
AQP				363	0.01	0	0	New
A VÁLASZ				239	0.00	0	0	New
HATMAP				218	0.00	0	0	New
REND, SZABADSÁG				199	0.00	0	0	New
TBP				182	0.00	0	0	New
ÚGP				167	0.00	0	0	New
SZAVA				152	0.00	0	0	New
EGYIKSEM				71	0.00	0	0	New
KALÓZPÁRT				64	0.00	0	0	New
MAJP				58	0.00	0	0	New
NÉP				58	0.00	0	0	New
MEGÚJULÁSPÁRT				52	0.00	0	0	New
MNP				37	0.00	0	0	New
NOP				18	0.00	0	0	New
REND PÁRT				12	0.00	0	0	New
Independents				12,850	0.26	0	0	–1
Total	5,047,363	100.00	93	4,908,608	100.00	106	199	–187
Valid votes	5,047,363	99.09		4,908,608	98.90			
Invalid/blank votes	46,173	0.91		54,728	1.10			
Total votes	5,093,536	100.00		4,963,336	100.00			
Registered voters/turnout	8,241,488	61.80		8,047,769	61.67			
Source: National Election Office, Election Resources

=== Party list results by county and in the diaspora ===
Results by county: Fidesz: 30–40% 40–50% 50–60%

County	Fidesz–KDNP	Unity	Jobbik	LMP	Others
Bács-Kiskun	50.21	20.25	21.11	4.56	3.87
Baranya	40.13	27.52	19.51	6.21	6.62
Békés	43.98	23.21	23.15	4.21	5.43
Borsod-Abaúj-Zemplén	38.54	24.85	29.45	2.87	4.29
Budapest	38.48	36.75	12.07	8.92	3.78
Csongrád	41.66	27.05	20.20	6.68	4.43
Fejér	45.89	23.23	21.74	5.02	4.11
Győr-Moson-Sopron	51.54	21.88	17.78	5.50	3.29
Hajdú-Bihar	46.03	20.21	25.40	4.38	3.98
Heves	39.22	23.84	30.43	3.42	3.11
Jász-Nagykun-Szolnok	42.35	22.04	28.26	3.44	3.88
Komárom-Esztergom	42.16	28.08	19.92	5.46	4.39
Nógrád	42.91	24.46	24.35	3.10	5.17
Pest	44.75	25.87	18.87	6.11	4.38
Somogy	44.83	24.49	22.97	4.06	3.66
Szabolcs-Szatmár-Bereg	46.76	21.00	26.10	2.44	3.70
Tolna	46.69	22.55	22.04	4.56	4.18
Vas	51.82	21.94	17.76	5.17	3.30
Veszprém	46.17	24.69	20.55	4.92	3.69
Zala	44.69	22.90	24.81	4.39	3.19
Total in Hungary	43.55	26.21	20.69	5.47	4.09
Diaspora	95.49	1.16	2.28	0.45	0.62
Total	44.87	25.57	20.22	5.34	4.00

== Reactions ==
=== Domestic ===
Fidesz's leader Viktor Orbán celebrated in Budapest with thousands of supporters in the evening and said that Hungary was on the threshold of a "new and wonderful epoch".

Jobbik leader Gábor Vona said that the party is now the "strongest national radical party" in the EU, as well as Hungary’s second largest political party". Jobbik continuously increases its popularity and ahead of the European parliament elections it is important to make this clear. [Yet even though] we outperformed pollsters’ expectations, but we were not able to achieve the goal we set for ourselves of winning the elections".

One of the five party alliance's leaders, Gordon Bajnai, said the result was a "crushing defeat" and a "great disappointment" for those who wanted change.

=== International ===
European People's Party (EPP) President Joseph Daul and President of the European Commission José Manuel Barroso congratulated Orbán. Daul said "the Hungarian nation had renewed its confidence in Viktor Orbán, who always told it the truth and carried out brave reforms, putting the economy back on its feet." He also expressed the conviction that Fidesz would also triumph in the European parliament election in May.

Russian President Vladimir Putin also congratulated Orbán on his victory, saying that "we highly esteem constructive and mutually beneficial Russian–Hungarian relations and have an interest in continuing our shared work, in solidifying bilateral cooperation for the benefit of our two nations and for a stable and safe Europe."

The Office for Democratic Institutions and Human Rights Limited Election Observation Mission found that the elections were "efficiently administered and offered voters a diverse choice following an inclusive candidate registration process" but that Fidesz "enjoyed an undue advantage because of restrictive campaign regulations, biased media coverage and campaign activities that blurred the separation between political party and the State".

Due to Jobbik's performance, Viatcheslav Moshe Kantor, the president of the European Jewish Congress, said the party was an "unashamedly neo-Nazi party" and that the result was a "wake up call. This is a party that feeds on hate."

== See also ==
- 2014 European Parliament election in Hungary
- 2014 Hungarian local elections
- List of members of the National Assembly of Hungary (2014–18)
