= Gábor Simon =

Gábor Simon is the name of:

- Gábor Simon (politician, 1964) (born 1964), Hungarian teacher and politician, member of the National Assembly from 2002 until resignation in February 2014
- Gábor Simon (politician, 1972) (born 1972), Hungarian jurist and politician, member of the National Assembly since 2002
- Gábor Simon, Hungarian record producer and DJ whose stage name is Jade
