= József Ángyán =

Hungarian professor and politician

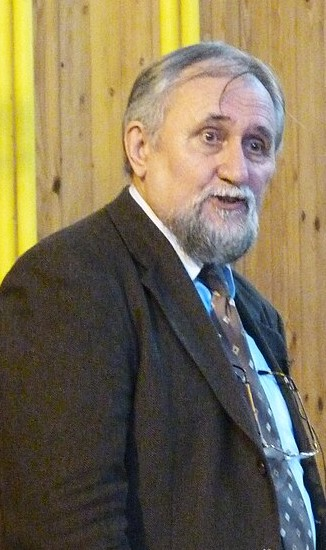

Member of the National Assembly
- In office 16 May 2006 – 5 May 2014

Personal details
- Born: 20 September 1952 (age 73) Nagyatád, Hungary
- Party: Independent
- Spouse: Ildikó Gött
- Children: Ildikó; Rita; Tamás; Péter; Katalin
- Profession: agricultural engineer, professor, politician

József Ángyán (born September 20, 1952) is a Hungarian agriculture engineer, professor and politician who served as State Secretary in the Ministry of Rural Development from June 2, 2010 to February 5, 2012. He was a member of the National Assembly (MP) between 2006 and 2014.

== Biography ==
He was born in Nagyatád on 20 September 1952. He finished secondary school in Siófok, in 1971. He graduated as an agricultural engineer from the Gödöllő University of Agricultural Sciences in 1977 and obtained a doctor of sciences in 1979 as well as a specialized agricultural research engineer degree in 1980. He obtained his candidature degree in the field of agricultural science in 1993 and habilitated in the field of environment science in 1998. He speaks German and Russian at an intermediate level and English at an elementary level.

His career was long associated with the Agricultural University of Gödöllő and, later, with the legal successor of this university. He was appointed Professor at the university in 1999. From 1991 till 1996, he worked as a founding deputy director and from 1996 as director of the Institute for Environment and Land Farming, one of ten new departments the university established during this time. His post as institute director was extended for an additional five years in 2006. He and colleagues also established a new course in environmental management for agricultural engineers in 1990. He was also one of the founders of the PhD programme in Environmental Sciences under Agricultural Sciences at Gödöllő, and headed the Environmental Management field there. His teaching and research are generally connected with agriculture, environmental protection and management, and national economic development.

=== Political career ===
During the transition to democracy, he was active in the pro-democracy movement in Gödöllő and supported Gábor Roszík, who became the first democratically elected opposition MP in the parliament. Ángyán briefly was also a member of the Christian Democratic People's Party (KDNP) in 1989, but did not enter political career. As a key member of the advocacy organization National Alliance of Hungarian Farmers (MAGOSZ), he actively organized the 2005 tractor farmer protests against the Socialist government.

After the MAGOSZ concluded a political alliance with the right-wing Fidesz, Ángyán was elected MP of the Pest county regional list (Fidesz) in 2006 elections. He was a member of the Committee on Agriculture until 2010.

He was appointed State Secretary in the Ministry of Rural Development on June 2, 2010. He resigned on January 24, 2012. After that he raised many controversial issues in the relationship between the Fidesz government and some influential "close-ally" businessmen, including Lajos Simicska and Zsolt Nyerges, who were called by Ángyán as "oligarchs" in his statements. Ángyán called attention to abuses among state land lease tenders, where the method and criteria of evaluation remained unknown.

During the year, Ángyán rolled up the controversial cases in sequence. He published a comprehensive report, in which he urged the government to set aside instantly the already announced land lease tenders and review the closed ones. In response, András Tállai, Secretary of State for Internal Affairs, called him to leave the Fidesz parliamentary group.

In December 2012, he voted against the amendment on land bill of the Constitution of Hungary, despite the parliamentary group's central guide. As a result the caucus fined Ángyán, who maintained his position in an HVG interview. Ángyán left the Fidesz parliamentary group on June 21, 2013, when the majority of the parliament adopted a controversial new land act under scandalous circumstances.

Ángyán unsuccessfully ran for a parliamentary seat during the 2014 parliamentary election as a candidate of the Human Chain for Hungary.

== Personal life ==
He is married. His wife is Ildikó Gött. They have five children - three daughters, Ildikó, Rita and Katalin and two sons, Tamás and Péter.

== Selected publications ==
- Ángyán J. (szerk.) (1987): Agroökológiai hatások a kukoricatermesztésben. (Az agroökológiai körzetek és a területi fejlesztés) Közgazdasági és Jogi Könyvkiadó, Bp., 210 p.
- Ángyán J. - Menyhért, Z. (1988): Integrált, alkalmazkodó növénytermesztés (Ésszerû környezetgazdálkodás), Közgazdasági és Jogi Könyvkiadó, Bp., 163 p.
- Ángyán J. - Kiss J. - Menyhért Z. - Szalai T. - Podmaniczky L. (1994): Alternative agricultural strategies and their feasibility in relation to the Hungarian conditions. In: Van Lier, H. N. - Jaarsma, C. F. - Jurgens, C. R. - Debuck, A. J. (edit): Sustainable land use planning, Elsevier Science B. V., Amsterdam - London - New York - Tokyo, 360 p., 69-78. p.
- Ángyán J. (1995): Sustainability as a Possible Basic Concept of Agricultural Transition in Hungary. Hungarian Agricultural Research, Budapest, Vol. 4, No. 4, 9-15.p.
- Ángyán J. – Menyhért Z. (szerk.) (1997): Alkalmazkodó növénytermesztés, ésszerû környezetgazdálkodás, Mezõgazdasági Szaktudás Kiadó, Bp., 414 p.
- Ángyán J. (1999): Nachhaltigkeit – Strategie für die ungarische Landwirtschaft (In: Scheiber E. – Larndorfer G. (Red.): Zukunft der Nachhaltigkeit, Ökosoziales Forum Österreich, Wien, 176 p.), 104-107. p.
- Ángyán J. (2001): Az európai agrármodell, a magyar útkeresés és a környezetgazdálkodás, Agroinform Kiadóház, Budapest, 308 p.
- Ángyán J. – Tardy J. – Vajnáné Madarassy A. (szerk.) (2003): Védett és érzékeny természeti területek mezõgazdálkodásának alapjai, Mezõgazda Kiadó, Budapest, 625 p.
- Ángyán J. – Balázs K. – Podmaniczky L. – Skutai J. (2003): Integrated land use zonation system in Hungary as a territorial base for agri-environmental programs (In: Helming K. – Wiggering H. (ed.): Sustainable development of multifunktional landscapes, Springer-Verlag, Berlin-Heidelberg-New York, 286 p.), 125-141. p.
- Ángyán J. – Menyhért Z. (szerk.) (2004): Alkalmazkodó növénytermesztés, környezet- és tájgazdálkodás; Szaktudás Kiadóház, Budapest, 560 p.
