= Fake party =

Electoral manipulation tool, notable in Hungarian elections

In electoral politics, a fake party is a political party registered for the sole purpose of receiving state funding or confusing voters. Fake parties may serve as spoilers in elections either by fielding spoiler candidates, spoiler lists (which fall below the electoral threshold and result in wasted votes) or fielding a decoy list to manipulate the electoral system.

== Hungary ==
In Hungarian politics, a fake party (Hungarian: kamupárt) or business party (Hungarian: bizniszpárt) is a political party registered for the sole purpose of receiving state funding and confusing voters, especially opposition voters. The phenomenon started during the campaign for the 2014 Hungarian parliamentary election, as a result of simplification of the political party registration resulting in significantly lower barriers for party registration. During the 2014 election, an estimated 4 billion forint of subsidies were given to fake parties. In order to receive access to the ballot, a party requires 500 valid signatures from voters, although fake parties often use forged signatures including ones also on the lists of Fidesz. Most fake parties often receive low shares of the vote, although votes for fake parties reached 3% in 2014.
