= 4K! – Fourth Republic! =

4K! – Fourth Republic! 4K! – Negyedik Köztársaságot!
- Leader: András Istvánffy
- Founded: 28 April 2012
- Dissolved: 9 October 2016
- Headquarters: Budapest
- Ideology: Anti-establishment; Left-wing nationalism Participatory democracy Social democracy
- Political position: Left-wing
- Colours: Red and yellow

Website
- negyedikkoztarsasag.hu

The 4K! – Fourth Republic! (Hungarian: 4K! – Negyedik Köztársaságot!), often abbreviated 4K!, was a social-democratic political party in Hungary. It was led by András Istvánffy. It was formed at a Congress in April 2012, and its membership was largely drawn from a predecessor civil organization, also called 4K!.

== History and aims ==
As the name indicates, 4K! aspired to establish a new republic of Hungary, based on a restatement of values of social justice, equality and self-determination. The leadership is committed to a 'republican revolution' with the aim of returning power to the people of Hungary.

The leadership criticised both the existing right-wing Fidesz government for their approach to the working class in Hungary, while castigating the Hungarian Socialist Party for adherence to neoliberal economic policies.

On 31 January 2014, the party presented its national list for the 2014 parliamentary election. Istvánffy said the "4K! will be the only real new organization in the election, which is not failed politicians' attempt to return to the government." On 8 February 2014, Istvánffy announced the party's election program with the title of "New Social Contract". The program included the legalization of cannabis, removal of MPs' immunity, re-introduction of multi-rate tax system and concept of social housing system.

The party had 10 candidates out of 106 in the 2014 national election, not being able to verify a national list. It was not represented in the Hungarian parliament, but due to an alliance with Politics Can Be Different, the party won a municipal seat in the 20th district of the capital city, Budapest in the autumn local elections.

== Dissolution ==
On 13 August 2016, the entire leadership resigned and called for an Electoral Congress, which decided to abolish the party on 9 October 2016. As the last memorandum argued, "there is no point in participating in the pseudo-democracy that [Prime Minister] Viktor Orbán has created in Hungary." They added, any opposition party which accepts the one-sided rules adopted by the Orbán government, "only supports the regime and legitimizes its existence" as part of the "decorative opposition". Thus the 4K! also suggested all opposition parties to abolish itself in order to stop legitimizing the "Orbán regime", comparing to the political systems in Russia and Turkey.

== Leaders ==
	Image	Name	Entered office	Left office	Length of Leadership
1		András Istvánffy	28 April 2012	9 October 2016	4 years, 5 months and 11 days

== Election results ==
=== National Assembly ===
Election year	National Assembly				Government
Election year	# of overall votes	% of overall vote	# of overall seats won	+/–	Government
2014	1,897	0.04%	0 / 199		extra-parliamentary
