= Unity Party (Hungary, 2009) =

Unity Party Összefogás Párt
- Leader: Zsolt Szepessy
- Founded: 17 November 2009
- Dissolved: 31 July 2018
- Headquarters: 1073 Budapest, Erzsébet krt. III./2.
- Ideology: Third Way
- Political position: Centre-right
- Colours: red, white, green

Website
- www.osszefogaspart.hu

The Unity Party (Hungarian: Összefogás Párt, pronounced [ˈøsːɛfoɡaːʃ ˈpaːrt]), abbreviated to ÖP, was a centre-right political party in Hungary. It had a third way ideology. The party was dissolved on 31 July 2018.

== Election results ==
For the Hungarian Parliament:

| Election year | National Assembly | | | | Government |
| Election year | # of overall votes | % of overall vote | # of overall seats won | +/– | Government |
|---|---|---|---|---|---|
| 2010 | 2,732 | 0.07% | 0 / 386 | | extra-parliamentary |
| 2014 | 6,552 | 0.13% | 0 / 199 | 0 | extra-parliamentary |
| 2018 | 1,407 | 0.02% | 0 / 199 | 0 | extra-parliamentary |
