= Human Chain for Hungary =

Hungarian political party

Human Chain for Hungary Élőlánc Magyarországért
- Leader: Collective presidency
- Founded: 8 October 2005
- Ideology: Green politics Environmentalism; Direct democracy
- Political position: Centre
- National Assembly: 0 / 199
- European Parliament: 0 / 21

Website
- http://www.elolanc.hu/

The Human Chain for Hungary (Hungarian: Élőlánc Magyarországért), or simply Human Chain, is a green political party in Hungary, founded in October 2005.

== History ==
The Human Chain was founded by 52 environmentalist and civil activists under the initiative of writer and Védegylet founder András Lányi on 8 October 2005. The party elected a 5-member collective leadership (András Lányi, agrarian engineer Éva Ács, architect Attila Ertsey, economist Péter Kajner and essayist István Orosz). The Védegylet and the Duna Kör criticized the formation of the new party, considering that unseasonable. Since its foundation, the Human Chain is closely linked to the Kishantos Rural Development Center which had established an ecological model farm in the 1990s in Hantos, Fejér County. The party accepted its programme there on 10 December 2005, representing environmental policy, direct democracy and the right to self-determination of communities. The Human Chain held a protest on 28 January 2006 in front of the Hungarian Parliament Building, where protested against the cultivation and marketing of GM crops, with the human chain form of demonstration.

In the 2006 parliamentary election, the party's four candidates ran in individual constituencies, receiving 0.04 percent of the votes. During the 2006 local elections, one politician Áron Földi was elected to the representative body in Abony. The Human Chain gathered 492,000 signatures against the social security reform by the second half of 2008. The party did not participate in the 2010 parliamentary election.

During the Second Orbán Government, new controversial land law was developed and passed on 21 June 2013. According to the law, public lands will be privatized, the tenant Kishantos ecological model farm also came under threat. Following the law's adoption, Fidesz politician József Ángyán left his party. He called attention to abuses among state land lease tenders, which were favored for the Fidesz close-ally entrepreneurs and "oligarchs", according to him. The tenders distributed the Kishantos farm among several new shareholders. Several international and domestic organizations, including Greenpeace protested against the government's method.

The Human Chain could run only 9 candidates in the 2014 parliamentary election. They received 0.07 percent of the votes and gained no seats.

== Election results ==
=== National Assembly ===
| Election year | National Assembly | | | | Government |
| Election year | # of overall votes | % of overall vote | # of overall seats won | +/– | Government |
|---|---|---|---|---|---|
| 2006 | 2,002 | 0.04% | 0 / 386 | | extra-parliamentary |
| 2014 | 3,328 | 0.07% | 0 / 199 | 0 | extra-parliamentary |

== Sources ==
- Vida, István (2011). "Élőlánc Magyarországért". Magyarországi politikai pártok lexikona (1846–2010) [Encyclopedia of the Political Parties in Hungary (1846–2010)] (in Hungarian). Gondolat Kiadó. pp. 345–346. ISBN 978-963-693-276-3.
