= TARKI Social Research Institute =

Research centre in Budapest, Hungary

TARKI Social Research Institute is an independent research centre located in Budapest, Hungary. TARKI conducts applied socioeconomic research in social stratification, labour markets, income distribution, intergenerational transfers, tax-benefit systems, consumption and lifestyle patterns and attitudes in Hungary and, in the majority of its projects, in Europe. TARKI is closely embedded in international collaborations with major European academic partners in various research projects. Senior staff at TARKI all have PhDs with substantive and methodological interests and many hold professorial appointments at major universities. TARKI has its own fieldwork apparatus, capable of carrying out regular empirical surveys on social structure and on attitudes and of managing large scale international research. TARKI also carries out the Hungarian fieldwork of various high-quality international surveys.

== Organisation ==
TARKI Social Research Institute is a member of the TARKI Group. Other members of the TARKI Group are: TARKI Foundation and KOPINT-TARKI Institute for Economic Research Ltd.

TARKI Foundation operates the Hungarian national social science data archive and is a member of the Council of European Social Science Data Archives (CESSDA). TARKI also conducts regular polls in Hungary.

== History ==
TARKI Social Science Data Archive founded 1985

New polling network founded 1991.

Institute becomes a private, for-profit, staff-owned shareholding company in 1998.

KOPINT-TARKI Economic Research Institute Ltd. was founded in 2007.

== Profile ==
TARKI's research profile has changed since it was first established.

- from macro to micro aspects of social stratification and economic activities
- from a focus on academic research towards applied social science
- from pure sociological to socio-economic methods
- In 2005, the institute shifted its focus to European comparative research. Activities related to this account are about half of the Institute's research portfolio.

== European research projects ==
- KIDS4ALLL - Key Inclusive Development Strategies for LifeLongLearning (2021-2024) The project aims to implement a pilot action that will experiment a learning method and learning environment in formal, non-formal and informal educational contexts to address the integration challenges of migrant and Roma children. The learning method builds on knowledge acquisition, skills training and attitude transfer to convey lifelong learning competences as a whole within a collaborative and co-creative learning process.
- Pioneered - Pioneering policies and practices tackling educational inequalities in Europe (2021-2024) An international research consortium strives to reduce educational inequalities in Europe by determining evidence-based policies and identifying pioneering measures and practices to enhance access to, uptake and completion of education, both in formal and informal educational settings. The project’s innovative approach combines analyses at different levels: from policies to institutions and individual students, teachers and parents. Particular focus will be placed on the specific (dis-) advantages at intersecting axes of inequality, as educational inequalities are particularly pronounced at such intersections. Additionally, research will be focused on scrutinising student trajectories to formulate innovative and (empirically) efficient tools to tackle educational inequalities.
- FRA Roma Survey 2020 - TÁRKI contributes to the FRA Roma Survey 2020, being implemented in 2020-2021 in ten Eastern and Southern European countries (Croatia, Czechia, Greece, Hungary, Italy, North Macedonia, Portugal, Romania, Spain, Serbia), commissioned by the European Agency for Fundamental Rights (FRA). The objective of the project is to conduct a comparative random probability face-to-face survey in ten European countries among the Roma population living in these countries. The purpose of the survey is to build on the latest FRA EU-MIDIS II survey and provide updated data about Roma inclusion in Europe. Another objective and one of the key challenges will be to contribute to and improve the survey instruments for sampling and surveying ‘hard-to-reach’ populations.
- UPLIFT - Urban Policy Innovation to address inequality with and for future generations (2020-2023) The UPLIFT consortium seeks to establish an innovative approach to urban policy design for reducing socio-economic inequalities. UPLIFT follows a multi-layer research method to map the processes and drivers of urban inequality in the post-crisis context. First, it uses macro level findings to contextualise micro level outcomes. It analyses the scale and dimensions of inequality in the EU, focusing on the national and regional (NUTS 2) scale. Second, it narrows down to sixteen functional urban areas looking at local inequality dimensions and drivers. On the third level come eight case studies, where micro-level analyses of vulnerability are carried out through the lens of youth (aged 15–29). On the fourth level UPLIFT co-creates reflexive policies with local stakeholders and communities.
- Study on the adequacy and sustainability of social protection system: attitudes in the EU (2019-2020) The overall purpose of the study was to collect and report policy-relevant evidence on preferences of the citizens for social protection. Moreover, the aim was that the evidence collected and presented by the study could be used to support the EU Member States in modernising their social protection systems. As well as informing them about perceptions in other countries, it should in addition help them to design policy answers which respond to the demand for social protection and redistribution. The study analyses the extent to which the idea of transnational and European solidarity is supported by people across the EU.
- EUROSHIP - Closing gaps in social citizenship. New tools to foster social resilience in Europe (2020-2023) The international EUROSHIP consortium will provide new, gender-sensitive, comparative knowledge about the effectiveness of changing social protection policies targeted at reducing poverty and social exclusion in Europe. Focal points will be the roles of social protection systems (including minimum income schemes), digitalisation of work and social protection delivery, and the social and political opportunities for active agency by three groups of citizens: youth at risk, precarious workers with care obligations and elderly and disabled people with long-term care needs.
- R-HOME- Roma: Housing, Opportunities, Mobilisation and Empowerment (2019-2021) The objectives of the R-HOME project are to reduce discrimination affecting Roma people with a particular focus on access to housing. It aims to support Roma integration through empowerment, the promotion and support of their active participation, capacity building and development of Roma and pro-Roma civil society. In order to support these aims we carry out background researches and collect and analyze best practices.
- InGRID-2 (2017-2021) As a continuation of InGRID, the objectives of the InGRID-2 were to advance the integration and innovation of distributed social sciences research infrastructures on ‘poverty, living conditions and social policies’ as well as ‘working conditions, vulnerability and labour policies’ in Europe. InGRID-2 extended transnational on-site and virtual access, organized mutual learning and discussions of innovations, and improved data services and facilities of comparative research. The further development of IPOLIS was supported as well, whereby TÁRKI expanded IPOLIS to include other vulnerable groups as migrants and Roma.
- INGRID - Inclusive Growth Infrastructure Diffusion (2013–2017) The project brought together 17 academic partners to provide the European scientific community with new and better opportunities to fulfil its key role in the development of evidence-based European policies on Inclusive Growth. TÁRKI led the poverty research pillar. It has also developed IPOLIS—an Integrated Poverty and Living Conditions Indicator System. The indicator database relies on the concept of quality of life and includes children, young people, and the elderly.
- CEASEVAL – Evaluation of the Common European Asylum System under Pressure and Recommendations for Further Development. (2017–2019) Since 2015, migration to and within Europe has challenged the adequacy of the Common European Asylum System (CEAS). Led by the Technische Universitat Chemnitz, the project aims to evaluate CEAS by looking into its frameworks and practical aspects. TÁRKI analyses the role of media in the migration crisis on national and international levels and is responsible for the Hungarian report.
- PRIVMORT – Privatisation and Mortality Crisis in Post-Communism: A Multi-Level indirect demographic Analysis, "Ideas" Specific Programme. Led by Cambridge University, the international consortium investigated patterns and reasons of mortality change in three countries (Belorussia, Hungary and Russia). TÁRKI coordinated large scale empirical surveys in the three countries.
- STYLE – Strategic Transitions for Youth Labour in Europe (2014–2017) The project brought 24 consortium partners together, including an international advisory network and local advisory boards of employers, unions, policy makers and NGOs from over 20 European countries. The project was led by the University of Brighton, ran for 42 months, examined the obstacles and opportunities affecting youth employment in Europe.
- Poverty Reduction in Europe: Social policy and innovation (IMPROVE), (2012–2016) The research developed new tools for monitoring poverty, social policy and social innovative practices. For the first time reference budgets were computed for several member states using a single theoretical framework and a consistent methodology. TÁRKI led work packages on measurement and indicators of poverty and on the situation of the Roma.
- European Regions, EU External Borders and the Immediate Neighbours. Analysing Regional Development Options through Policies and Practices of Cross-Border Co-operation (Euborderregions), (2011–2015) The project's main objective was to identify challenges to economic, social and territorial cohesion as well as regional development potentials in different borderlands at the EU's external frontiers.
- Understanding Conflict and Integration Outcomes of Inter-Group Relations and Integration Policies in selected Neighbourhoods of Five European Cities (Concordia Discors), (2011–2012) The Concordia Discors Project is investigating intergroup relations at neighbourhood level, with the aim of producing a deep, strongly empirical-based and directly policy-relevant understanding of integration and conflict processes in the neighbourhoods of European cities.
- Growing Inequalities' Impacts (GINI), (2010–2013) Growing Inequalities' Impacts. (2010–2013) The project was a major European-wide study on the impact of growing inequalities, coordinated by University of Amsterdam. Results are summarized in two volumes on "Changing Inequalities and Societal Impacts in Rich Countries" by Oxford University Press. The project was coordinated by University of Amsterdam.
- Social Situation Observatory - Income Distribution and Living Conditions, (2004–2016) A consortium led by Applica, Brussels (having TÁRKI, Essex University and Eurocentre, Vienna) produced annual monitoring reports on trends of income distribution and social inclusion in Europe.
- Assessing Needs of Care in European Nations (ANCIEN), (2009–2012) The project proceeds in consecutive steps of collecting and analysing information and projecting future scenarios on long term care needs, use, quality assurance and system performance.
- Workcare synergies: Dissemination of EU research findings, (2010–2011) A support action with the aim of disseminating research findings of previous EU Framework Programme projects in the field of work and care.
- EUROMOD research project, (2005–2011) EUROMOD is a tax-benefit microsimulation model for the European Union (EU) that enables researchers and policy analysts to calculate, in a comparable manner, the effects of taxes and benefits on household incomes and work incentives for the population of each country and for the EU as a whole.
- Survey of Health, Ageing and Retirement in Europe (SHARE), (2009–ongoing) The Survey of Health, Ageing and Retirement in Europe is a multidisciplinary and cross-national panel database of micro data on health, socio-economic status and social and family networks of more than 45,000 individuals aged 50 or over.
- Interplay of European, National, and Regional Identities: Nations between States along the New Eastern Borders of the European Union (ENRI-East), (2008–2011)

ENRI-East is an international research project dedicated to the study of socio-ethnic identities in East European countries.
- Towards a Lifelong Learning Society in Europe: The Contribution of the Education System (LLL 2010), (2005–2010) The project focused on the contribution of the education systems to the process of making lifelong learning a reality and its role as a potential agency of social integration.

- Study on Child Poverty, (2008–2009) A study on in-depth analysis of the determinants of child poverty, policy overview and impact analysis, identification of best indicators. The publication was supported under the European Community Programme for Employment and Social Solidarity (2007–2013) and the programme was managed by the DG Employment.
- Social Quality and the Changing Relationship between Work, Care and Welfare in Europe (WORKCARE), (2006–2009) The research project explores the relationships between, structural changes labour market, demography, welfare and economic policies at the macro level and at the micro level changes in individual orientations to work and care.
- Higher Education as a Generator of Strategic Competences (HEGESCO), (2008–2009)

The project addresses the needs of the main groups of higher education (HE) stakeholders who are interested in the employability of graduates. Based on several project reports, higher education institutions have been provided with empirically based evidence for planning their curricula, strategies and general orientations.

- Monitoring pensions developments through micro socio economic instruments based on individual data sources: feasibility study (PENMICRO), (2008)

The overarching aim of this project is to develop an analytical framework capable of capturing the relevant aspects of micro socio economic instruments Member States apply in modelling future developments in their pension schemes and the datasets behind them, and to apply this framework in describing and comparing the national approaches.

- Adequacy and sustainability of old-age income maintenance (AIM), (2005–2008)

This project aims at providing a strengthened conceptual and scientific basis for assessing the capacity of European pension systems to deliver adequate old age income maintenance in a context of low fertility and steadily increasing life expectancy.
- Ageing, Health Status and Determinants of Health Expenditure (AHEAD), (2004–2008) AHEAD was a three-year research project on the future evolution of health expenditure in the enlarged European Union.
- Euroalmalaurea Network: E-Recruitment Services, (2005–2007) The main goal of the project was to develop a "functioning" prototype of a European graduates' database including the CV's of graduates from the French, Dutch, Polish, Hungarian and the Italian Universities which are part of the AlmaLaurea Consortium.

== Membership in networks ==
- International Federation of Data Organizations for the Social Science (IFDO)
- Luxembourg Income Study (LIS)
- International Social Survey Programme (ISSP)
- European Network of Economic Policy Research Institutes (ENEPRI)
- Central European Opinion Research Group (CEORG)
- Inequality Watch, European Observatory of Inequalities

== Publication series ==
Social Report (Társadalmi Riport): Collection of studies on social trends in Hungary. The first Social Report was published in 1990 and has been published every second year since then. It is widely reported upon in the Hungarian media.

TARKI Household Monitor Report (TÁRKI Háztartás Monitor Jelentések): Analyses of data collected from the biennial cross-sectional TARKI Household Monitor survey.

Changing Values (Szerepváltozások): Presents and tracks changes in the social position of women and men in Hungary. Changing Values is commissioned by the Hungarian Ministry of Social Affairs and Labour.

European Social Report: A series on European social trends.

== Researchers ==
Name	Date	Current position	Main fields of research
Tamás Kolosi	1985–	founder and president	social stratification, social structure, inequalities, value orientations
István György Tóth	1994–	director	income distribution, social policies, inequalities
Péter Szivós	1997–	managing director	social exclusion, poverty, social policy evaluation, microsimulation
András Gábos	2000–	senior researcher	fertility effects of intergenerational transfers, cost of children, work incentive effects of family policies, poverty (especially child poverty), income inequality
Péter Róbert	1985–	senior researcher, project manager	social mobility, education, lifelong learning, employment
Anikó Bernát	2002–	researcher	migration, people with disabilities, minorities, roma, child poverty
Márton Medgyesi	2000–	senior researcher	social policy, intergenerational transfers, income inequalities
Tamás Keller	2006–	researcher	attitudes, values, social stratification
Réka Branyiczki	2015–	researcher	social cohesion and inequality, ageing, Survey of Health and Retirement
