= Katalin Ertsey =

Hungarian journalist and politician

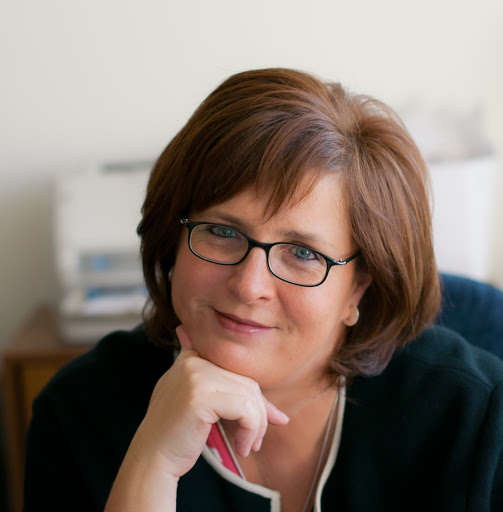

Member of the National Assembly
- In office 14 May 2010 – 5 May 2014

Personal details
- Born: 1966 (age 59–60) Budapest, Hungary
- Party: LMP (2009–2013)
- Children: Milla; Szonja
- Profession: educator, journalist

Katalin Ertsey (born 1966) is a Hungarian journalist and politician, member of the National Assembly (MP) from Politics Can Be Different (LMP) National List between 2010 and 2014. She was a member of the Committee on Consumer Protection from May 14, 2010 to February 11, 2013 and from September 23, 2013 to May 5, 2014, and also a member of the Committee on Foreign Affairs from March 7, 2011 to May 5, 2014 (as Deputy Chairperson since September 23, 2013).

In April 2011 Ertsey said about the new constitution that its fails to account for the constantly-changing family patterns of the 21st century and the couples planning to have children at a future date or single-parent families have not been mentioned in the constitution. She also called for more parliamentary representation for women. Later she said increasing the number of women was a basic need in a country where they account for 52 percent of society but have only 9 percent representation in parliament.

Ertsey spoke against domestic violence in September 2012 responding to the assertion of MP István Varga who said there would be no domestic violence if women had four or five children instead of only one or two during a parliamentary debate.

In November 2012, when MP Előd Novák inquired about all MPs' citizenships, Ertsey answered with irony: she said she had Israeli and Pirésian (a fictional people) citizenships and that she had obtained her Hungarian citizenship by buying it. In 2012, Ertsey suspended her party membership. She finally left the party in March 2013.
