= Gender sensitization =

Awareness raising on gender sensitivity

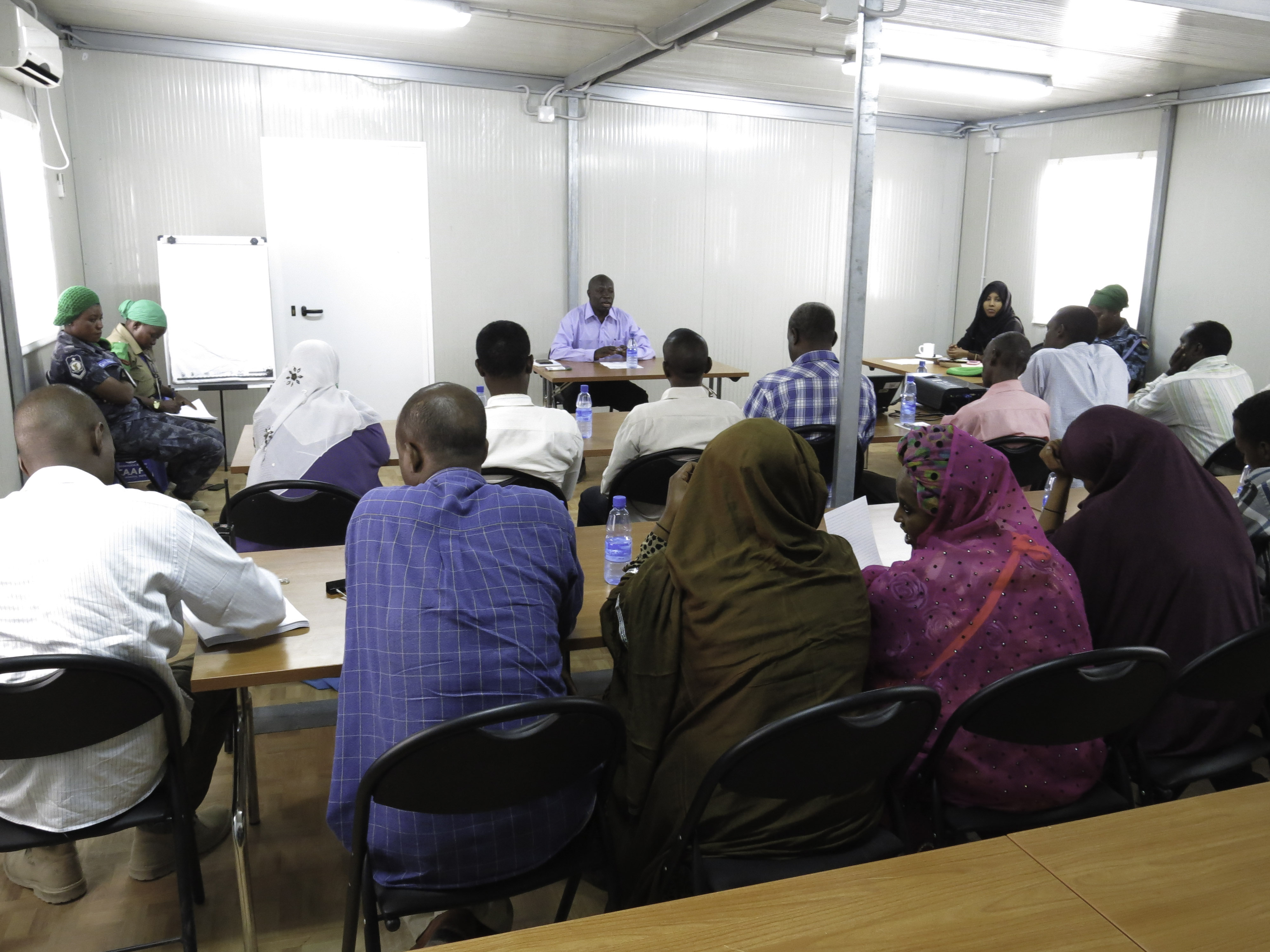
AMISOM Sensitizes its Somali Language Assistants on Sexual Exploitation and Abuse.

Gender symbols. The red is the female Venus symbol. The blue represents the male Mars symbol.

Gender sensitization is the process teaching of gender sensitivity and encouragement of behavior modification through raising awareness of gender equality concerns.

== Definition ==
In other words, it is the process of making people aware of gender equality or the lack of to the need to eliminate gender discrimination. It involves understanding and challenging the existing gender roles, stereotypes, and biases that are prevalent in society. Gender sensitization aims to create a more equal and just society where individuals are not discriminated against based on their gender.

== Goal ==
The goal of gender sensitization is to address issues in gender equality and encourage participants to pursue solutions. This can be achieved by conducting various sensitization campaigns, training center's, workshops, programs, etc. In the domain of Humanities and Social Sciences, sensitization is seen as an awareness-informed propensity or disposition which aims at changing behavior so that it is sensitive to certain issues. Gender sensitization may be seen as "the awareness informed propensity to behave in a manner which is sensitive to gender justice and gender equality issues."

It is interlinked with gender empowerment. Gender sensitization theories claim that modification of the behavior of teachers and parents (etc.) towards children which can have a causal effect on gender equality. This is because gender identity and gender roles begin to develop in children at the age of 2–3 years old.

Gender sensitizing "is about changing behavior and instilling empathy into the views that we hold about our own and the other genders." It helps people in "examining their personal attitudes and beliefs and questioning the 'realities' they thought they know.

== How it works ==
Gender sensitization can be achieved through various means, including education, training, and awareness-raising campaigns. It can be integrated into school curricula, workplace policies, and community programs. The aim is to create a culture where individuals are aware of gender issues and actively work towards gender equality.

Overall, gender sensitization is an essential aspect of creating a more equal and just society, where individuals are not discriminated against based on their gender. It is crucial to promote gender equality and challenge gender stereotypes and biases to create a world where all individuals have equal opportunities to succeed.
