= Gender sensitivity =

Societal aspect of gender

Gender sensitivity is the process by which people are made aware of how gender plays a role in life through their treatment of others. Gender relations are present in all institutions worldwide and gender sensitivity especially manifests in recognizing privilege and discrimination around gender; women are generally seen as disadvantaged in society. Major strides in international gender sensitivity awareness have been made in recent years, which is helping to improve living and working conditions for members of all gender groups, as well as more effective medical care. Gender sensitivity trainings are used to educate people, usually employees, to become more aware of and sensitive to gender in their lives or workplaces. This type of training is becoming more popular in the United States, particularly in areas of the service industry, such as healthcare and education.

== Gender sensitivity in healthcare ==
Gender sensitivity in reproductive health is reliant on treating all clients with equal respect, regardless of sex, gender identity, marital status, sexual orientation, or age. Indicators of gender-sensitive service include: refraining from discriminating against or stereotyping clients on the basis of sex or gender, treating all clients with equal respect, offering gender sensitivity training to all employees, and providing adequate representation of female care providers. Gender-sensitive care also depends on informed consent to treatment for all clients. If service providers deliver gender-sensitive care, their clients might be more likely to seek further service from that provider.

Other effective gender-sensitive practices include providing the option of same gender clinician-patient pairing and awareness of gender-specific needs in regards to personal safety and privacy. Addressing the unique needs of the non-binary and gender non-conforming population is another important feature of gender sensitivity in healthcare, as well as breaking down gender stereotypes that exist within the healthcare space.

== Gender sensitization and children ==
Gender sensitivity is enacted through a process known as gender sensitization. Gender sensitization promotes equality for men and women by allowing men and women to view what is stereotypical of and reasonable for their gender. Therefore, teachers are in a position to teach children about gender sensitization through how they conduct their classroom and interact with their students. Teachers who are successful at sensitizing their students to gender at a young age can influence a change in children's thought processes, which positions them to break societal stigmas in childhood and throughout life.

Teaching children to be sensitive to gender also relies heavily on the parents or guardians of the children. Children begin to develop their gender identity around two to three years old. At this age, gender identity is reinforced through messages from parents, whether gender sensitive or not. A common phrase that is not gender sensitive and might be heard by young children through their parents is “boys will be boys.” Other examples of non-gender-sensitive reinforcement of gender includes teaching children that pink is an objectively feminine color and blue is an objectively masculine color, as well as influencing young girls to play with dolls and boys to play with trucks. Educating children about gender identities that do not conform to the gender binary helps to break the stigma associated with these identities.

== Gender sensitivity training ==
Raising awareness of gender sensitivity issues and helping to combat the stereotypes and misinformation regarding said issues can be done via dedicated gender sensitivity training. Such training programs typically provide information on topics such as gender inequality, stereotypes and stigmas, as well as gender-specific communication skills. Terminology and the history of gender issues are also topics of study in these programs. International collaboration towards developing standards for these training modules has helped to spur progress in gender sensitivity and equality, increasing quality of life and economic growth worldwide.

Some training modalities for these programs include online modules and prerecorded media, in-person lectures and classroom settings, as well as workshops and other group activities. These programs can be single-session or consist of multiple sections spread out over longer periods of time.

Although the effects of gender sensitivity training are mostly positive when analyzed on average, men have been shown to have a lower level of acceptance to these training programs than women in most circumstances.

== Global gender sensitivity progress by region ==
=== Africa ===
Although countries in the African continent tend to struggle economically, there have been major strides in improving gender sensitivity in the region. Women have seen success in starting their own successful businesses in countries like South Africa, despite traditional gender norms not having women in consideration for such feats. There is still progress to be made, and much of that can be influenced by government involvement in the efforts to revert laws that hinder women from progressing in their careers.

=== India ===
Gender plays a large role in Indian thought processes. The separation of boy and girl indicators in India creates distance between men and women. Indicators of masculinity in boys include cars, the color blue, and superheroes; indicators of femininity in girls include dolls, the color pink, and princesses.

=== Middle East ===
Countries such as Saudi Arabia and the United Arab Emirates are historically known to have poor gender sensitivity acceptance rates, despite their high economic standing. Currently, many women in this region are restricted to traditional housewife duties such as homemaking and childcare. Some of this cultural rigidity has been attributed to the dependence of oil for the economies of nations in the Middle East.

=== Scandinavia ===
Sweden is making a strong effort to become more gender sensitive. Sweden recently added the word “hen”—a gender-neutral pronoun—to their common language. This promotes a gender-neutral way of thinking for children.

=== United Kingdom ===
Feminist movements in the United Kingdom have led to an increase in gender sensitivity acceptance both for women and for men alike. Expanding social services for all genders and making these conversations commonplace has led to positive progress in the region.

== See also ==
- Gender equality
- Gender sensitization
- Gender stereotypes
