= Lajos Mile =

Hungarian journalist and politician

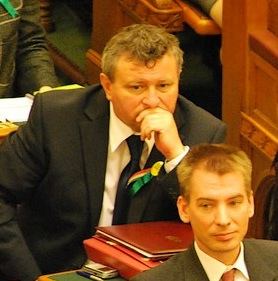

Member of the National Assembly
- In office 14 May 2010 – 5 May 2014
- In office 2 May 1990 – 27 June 1994

Personal details
- Born: 14 December 1958 (age 67) Debrecen, Hungary
- Party: MDF (1987–1996); MDNP (1996–1998); LMP (2009–2014)
- Children: 3
- Profession: journalist

Lajos Mile (born 14 December 1958) is a Hungarian journalist, politician and diplomat, member of the National Assembly (MP) from Politics Can Be Different (LMP) National List between 2010 and 2014. He was also Member of Parliament for Miskolc (Borsod-Abaúj-Zemplén County Constituency III) between 1990 and 1994.

== Biography ==
He was born in Debrecen and raised in Kisnamény, Szabolcs-Szatmár-Bereg County. He finished his secondary studies at the Practice Grammar School of the Lajos Kossuth University in Debrecen. He graduated from the Lajos Kossuth University as Hungarian-French teacher. He taught in many places. After his wedding moved to Miskolc where he worked for a museum as a literary historian. He published critiques, reviews and began political career here.

Mile participated in the foundation of the Hungarian Democratic Forum (MDF) in 1987. He organized the local Hungarian Round Table Talks in Miskolc. During the first democratic parliamentary election in 1990, he was elected MP for Miskolc. After his divorce, he moved to Kistokaj then Budapest. He served as a member of the National Defense Committee (1990–1993) later Committee for Culture, Science, Higher Education, Television, Radio and Press (1993–1994).

After the defeat in 1994 he was a member of the General Assembly of Borsod-Abaúj-Zemplén County from 1994 to 1998. He belonged to the national liberal wing of the MDF. When the party split into two factions in 1996, Mile joined the Hungarian Democratic People's Party (MDNP) and became its Vice President. He unsuccessfully ran for a parliamentary seat in the 1998 national election. After that he retired from the politics and left the MDNP. He wrote articled to the Magyar Hírlap, Népszabadság and the online Zóna magazine.

Mile was a founding member of the LMP in Spring 2009. His name appeared in the sixth place of the LMP-HP joint list to the 2009 European Parliament election in Hungary. He was elected to the National Assembly from the party's National List in 2010, as a result he became again MP after 16 years. He was a member of the LMP's Electoral Board between 2009 and 2010. He held the office of deputy leader of the parliamentary group. He was a Vice Chairman of the Committee on European Affairs from 14 May 2010 to 11 February 2013. He was also a member of the National Security Committee between 2010 and 2014.

Mile had been the Consul General of the Hungarian Consulate General in Cluj-Napoca, Romania from July 2014 to July 2022. Mile was appointed Hungarian Ambassador to Tunisia in September 2022. He presented his credentials to President Kais Saied in November 2022.
