= Gábor Simon (politician, 1964) =

Hungarian politician

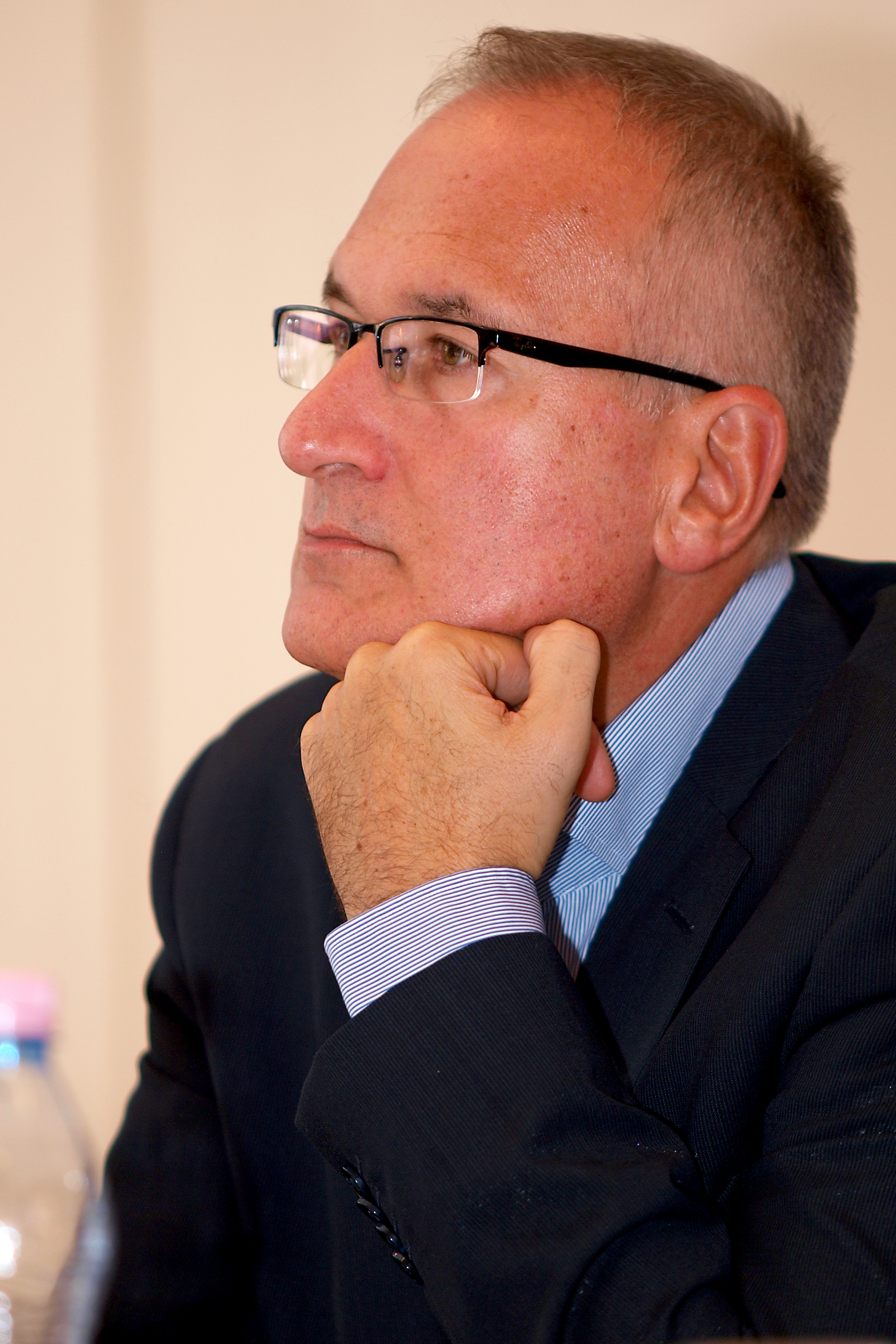

Member of the National Assembly
- In office 15 May 2002 – 12 February 2014

Personal details
- Born: 15 June 1964 (age 61) Sopron, Hungary
- Party: MSZP (1994–2014)
- Spouse: Tünde Márta Horváth
- Children: 2
- Profession: teacher, politician

Gábor Simon (born 15 June 1964) is a Hungarian teacher and politician, a member of the National Assembly from 2002 to 2014. He represented Pestszentlőrinc between 2006 and 2010. He served as Secretary of State for Social Affairs and Labour from 2008 to 2010.

He was the deputy leader of the Hungarian Socialist Party until February 2014, when his membership was suspended due to a corruption scandal.

== Political career ==
He secured a seat in the National Assembly from the party's Budapest Regional List during the 2002 parliamentary election. He was elected MP for Pestszentlőrinc (Budapest Constituency XXVI) in the 2006 parliamentary election. From 30 May 2006 to 18 February 2008, he served as Chairman of the Committee on Employment and Labour. He became a member of the National Assembly from the party's National List in the 2010 parliamentary election. He was appointed Chairman of the Committee on Consumer Protection on 2 June 2010.
