= Pécs =

City with county rights in Southern Transdanubia, Hungary

- City with county rights
- Pécs Megyei Jogú Város
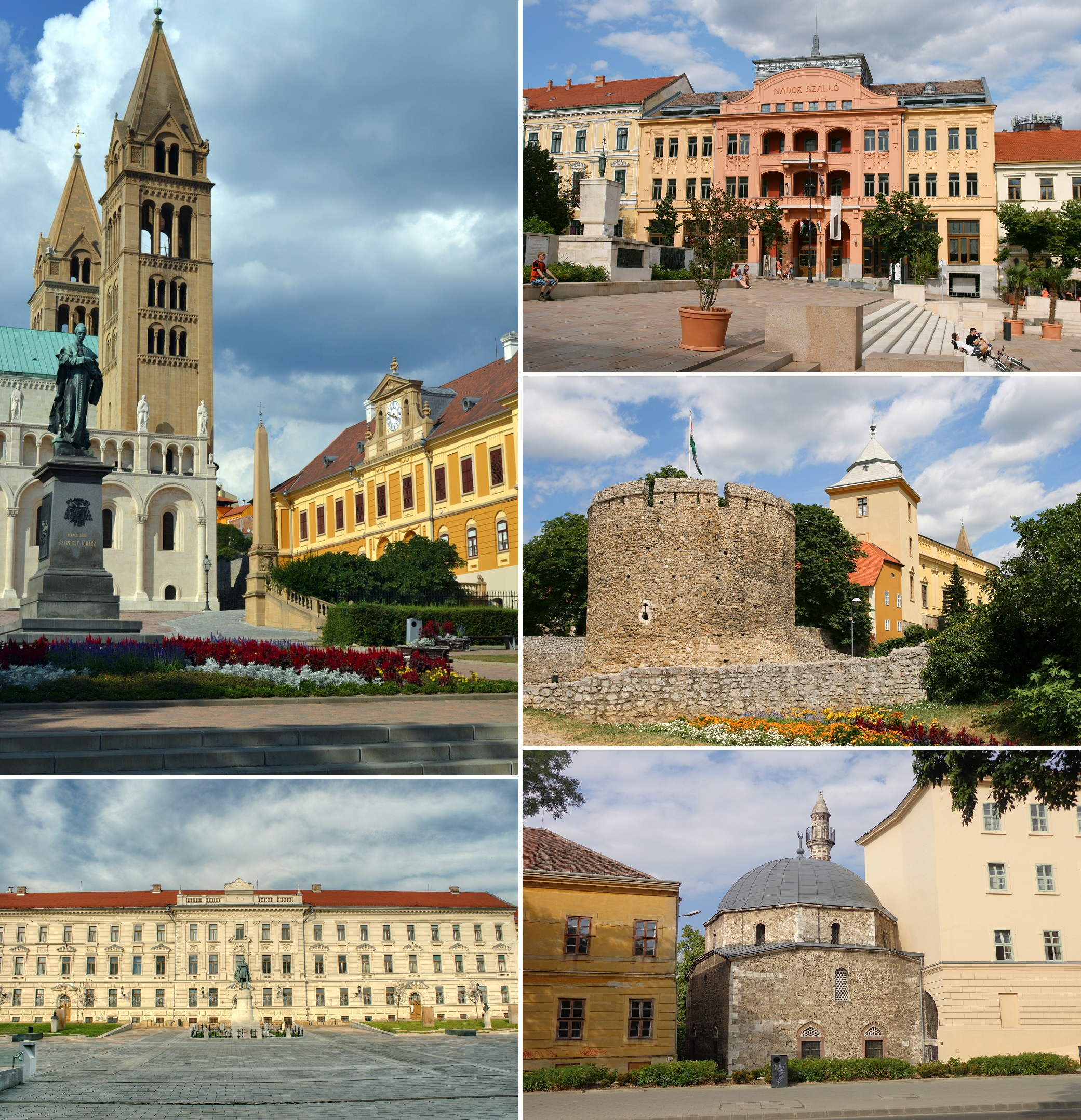
- Clockwise from top left: Cathedral, Széchenyi Square, Barbican, Yakovalı Hasan Paşa Mosque, Kossuth Square

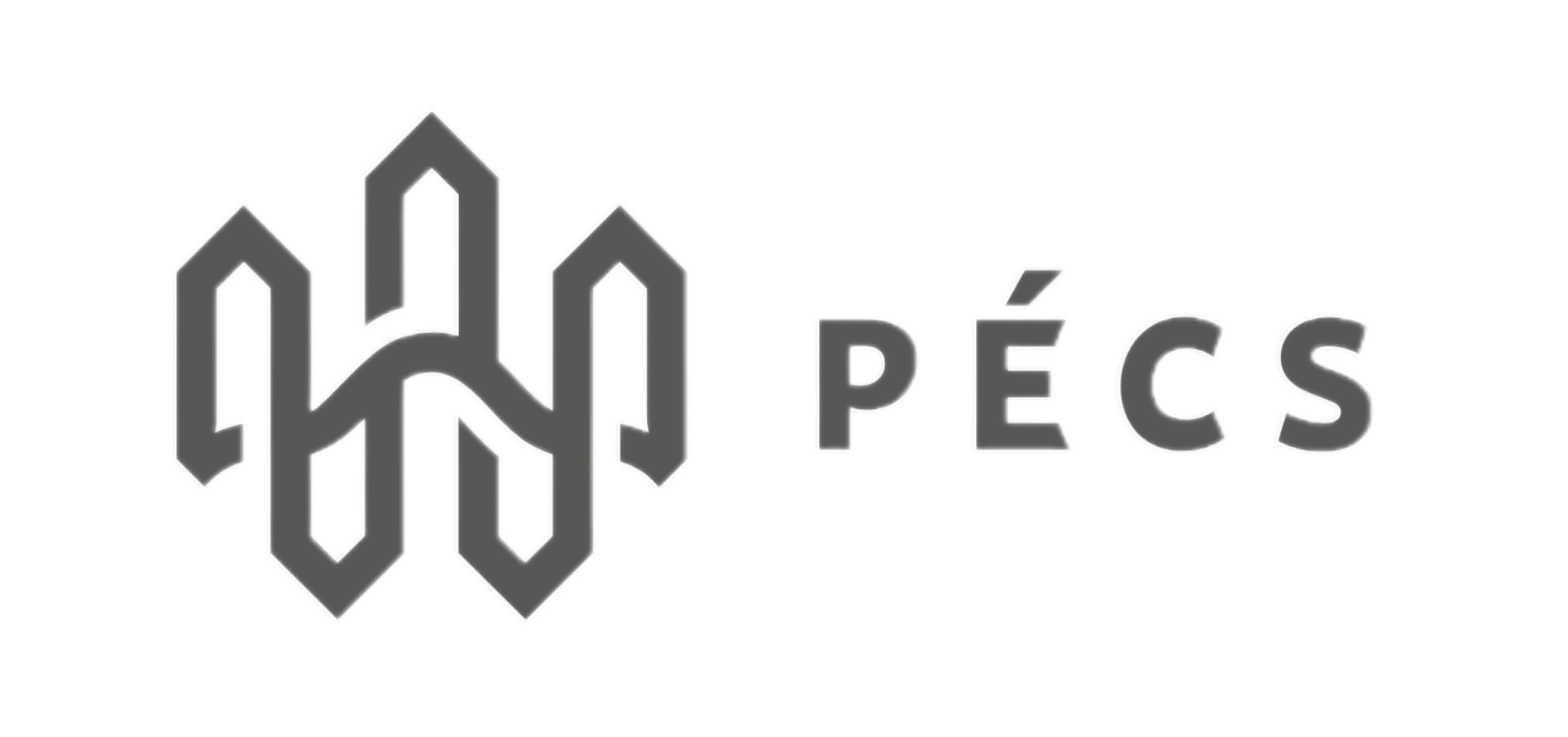
- Flag Coat of arms
- Nickname: "The City of Culture" (A kultúra városa)
- Interactive map of Pécs
- Location of Pécs Pécs (Hungary)
- Coordinates: 46°04′15″N 18°13′59″E
- Country: Hungary
- Region: Southern Transdanubia
- County: Baranya
- District: Pécs
- Established: 2nd century BC
- City status: 1777 (renewed)

Government
  - Mayor: Attila Péterffy (Pécs Jövője, Öt Torony)
  - Deputy mayor: Csaba Ruzsa (Independent); Gábor Zag (Pécs Jövője, Democratic Coalition)
  - Town Notary: Dr István Lovász

Area
  - City with county rights: 162.61 km^{2} (62.78 sq mi)
  - Rank: 32nd in Hungary
- Elevation: 153 m (502 ft)

Population (1 January 2016)
  - City with county rights: 145,347 ▼
  - Rank: 5th in Hungary
  - Density: 963.43/km^{2} (2,495.3/sq mi)
  - Urban: 251,412 (4th)
- Demonym: pécsi

Population by ethnicity
  - Hungarians: 84.0%
  - Germans: 4.2%
  - Romani: 2.0%
  - Croats: 1.2%
  - Romanians: 0.2%
  - Serbs: 0.2%
  - Slovaks: 0.1%
  - Greeks: 0.1%
  - Turks: 0.1%

Population by religion
  - Roman Catholic: 39.7%
  - Greek Catholic: 0.3%
  - Calvinists: 5.2%
  - Lutherans: 1.3%
  - Jews: 0.1%
  - Islam: 0.1%
  - Non-religious: 27.8%
- Time zone: UTC+01:00 (CET)
  - Summer (DST): UTC+02:00 (CEST)
- Postal code: 7600 to 7636
- Area code: (+36) 72
- Motorways: M60 Motorway
- NUTS 3 code: HU231
- Distance from Budapest: 238 km (148 mi) Northeast
- Airport: Pécs (PEV)
- MPs: List: Tamás Mellár (Independent); Péter Hoppál (Fidesz)
- Website: pecs.hu

UNESCO World Heritage Site
- Official name: Early Christian Necropolis of Pécs (Sopianae)
- Criteria: iii, iv
- Designated: 2000

Pécs (/peɪtʃ/ PAYTCH, Hungarian: [ˈpeːt͡ʃ]; Croatian: Pečuh; Slovak: Päťkostolie; also known by alternative names) is the fifth largest city in Hungary, on the slopes of the Mecsek mountains in the country's southwest, close to the border with Croatia. It is the administrative and economic centre of Baranya County, and the seat of the Roman Catholic Diocese of Pécs.

A city dating back to ancient times, settled by the Celts and the Romans, it was made an episcopal see in early medieval Hungary. It has the oldest university in the country, and is one of its major cultural centers. Pécs has a rich cultural and architectural heritage stemming from 150 years of Ottoman rule, and it contains the largest number of Turkish Ottoman buildings found in any city in Central Europe. It is historically a multi-ethnic city where many cultures have interacted through 2,000 years of history. In recent times, it has been recognized for its cultural heritage, including being named as one of the European Capital of Culture cities. The Roman-era Christian necropolis in Pécs was inscribed as a World Heritage Site in 2000.

== Name ==
The earliest name for the territory was its Roman name of Sopianæ. The name possibly comes from the plural of the Celtic sop meaning "marsh".

The medieval city was first mentioned in 871 under the name Quinque Basilicae ("five cathedrals".) The name refers to the fact that when constructing the churches of the city, the builders used material from five old Christian chapels. In later Latin documents the city was mentioned as Quinque Ecclesiae ("five churches", a name identical in meaning to the German name Fünfkirchen and the Slovak name Päťkostolie).

The name Pécs appears in documents in 1235 in the word Pechyut (with modern spelling: pécsi út, meaning "road to/from Pécs") most likely derives from the Proto-Slavic *pęčь or from the Illyrian *penče, both meaning five. In other languages: in Latin, Quinque Ecclesiae; in Italian, Cinquechiese; in Croatian, Pečuh; in Serbian, Печуј (Pečuj); in Slovak, Päťkostolie; in Czech, Pětikostelí; in Bosnian, Pečuj; in Albanian, Peçuj; in Dutch, Vijfkerken; in German, Fünfkirchen; and in Turkish, Peçuy.

== Geography ==
Pécs is located in the Carpathian Basin of Central Europe, in the center of the southern Hungarian county of Baranya. It is bordered by the Mecsek hills to the north, and by a rolling plain to the south. Pécs has a significant mining past. Mecsek dolomitic water is famous for its steady, balanced high density of minerals.

The city of Pécs is located near the border of Croatia. Its southern part is rather flat whereas its northern part clings to the slope of the Mecsek mountains. It has a very favorable climate, and is bordered by a flourishing woody area. During hot summer nights a cooling air streams down from Mecsek to clean the air of the city.

Pécs is bordered by plains to the south (elevation 120–130 m), while the Mecsek mountains rise up to elevations of 400–600 meters behind the city. Jakab-hegy, located in the western Mecsek, is 592 m (1942 ft) tall, Tubes, straight above Pécs, is 612 m (2008 ft) tall, and Misina is 535 m (1755 ft) tall. Higher parts of the city climb up to 200–250 m (656 to 820 ft), mainly Pécsbánya, Szabolcsfalu, Vasas and Somogy. Woody areas generally start from elevations of about 300 m (984 ft). The Mecsek hills are marked by numerous valleys which play a key role in ameliorating the climate of the city in the absence of lakes and rivers. Waters coming down from the Mecsek hills flow into the Pécsi stream under the east–west rail road leading them eventually to the Danube.

== History ==
Early Christian Necropolis of Pécs (Sopianae)
UNESCO World Heritage Site
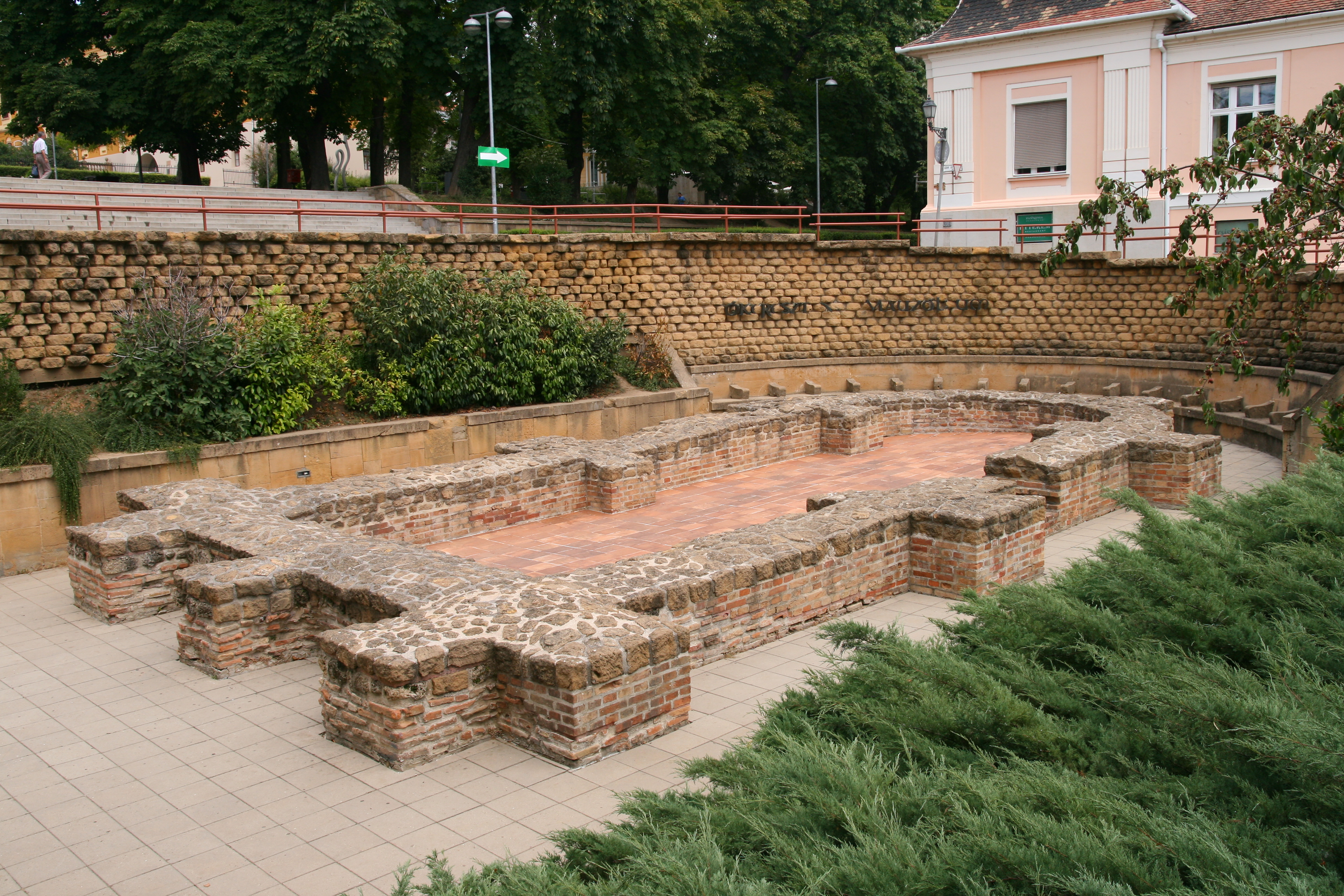
- Remnants of a Paleochristian church, 4th century AD
- Interactive map of Early Christian Necropolis of Pécs (Sopianae)
- Criteria: Cultural: iii, iv
- Reference: 853
- Inscription: 2000 (24th Session)
- Area: 3.76 ha (9.3 acres)
- Buffer zone: 4.87 ha (12.0 acres)

=== Ancient Roman city ===
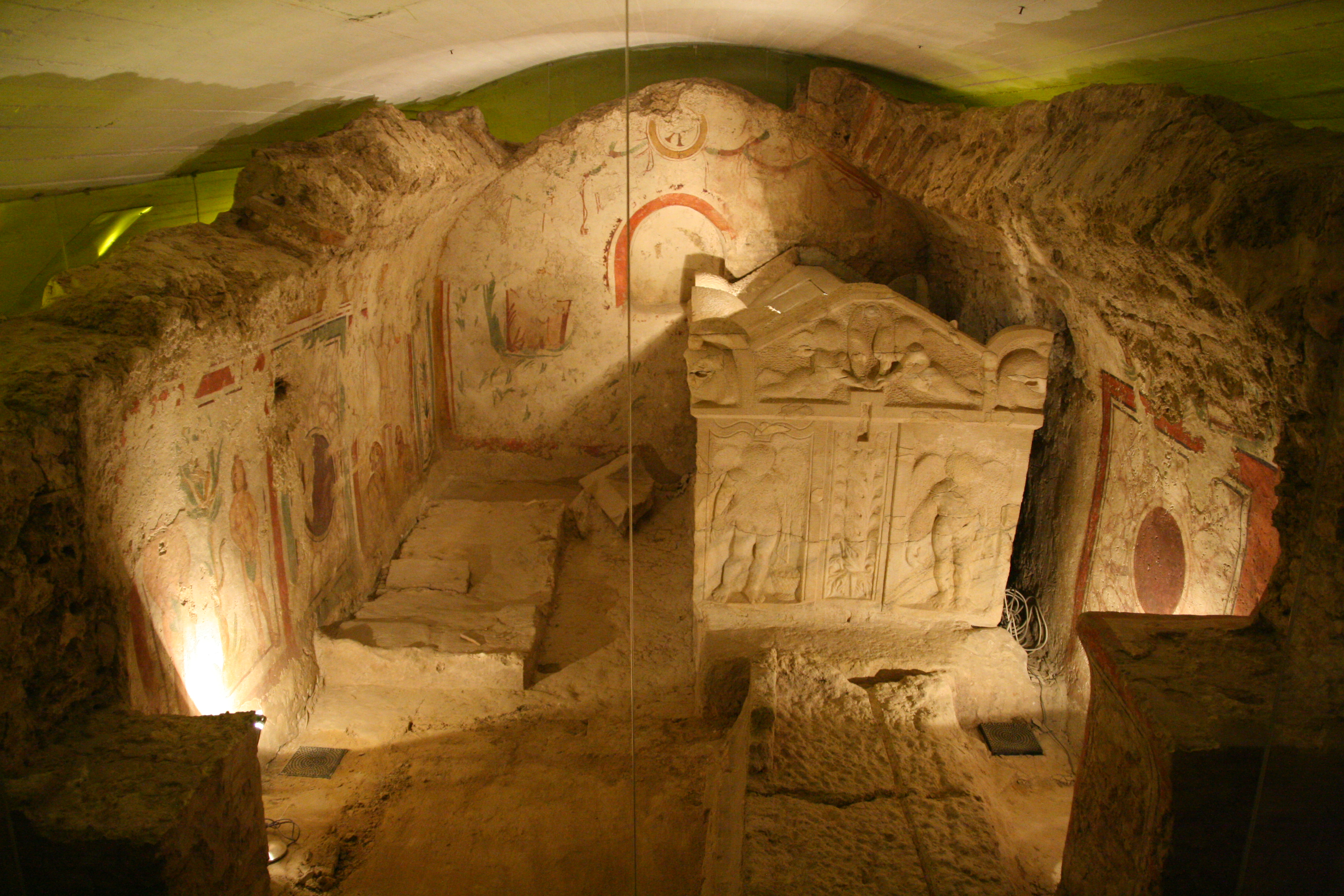
Early Christian Necropolis of Pécs (Sopianae)

The area has been inhabited since ancient times, with the oldest archaeological findings being 6,000 years old. Before the Roman era, the area was inhabited by Celts.

The city of Sopianae was founded by Romans at the beginning of the 2nd century, in an area peopled by Celts and Pannoni tribes.

In the early 2nd century, when much of today's western Hungary was a province of the Roman Empire named Pannonia, the Romans founded several wine-producing colonies under the collective name of Sopianae where Pécs now stands.

The centre of Sopianae was where the Bishop's Palace now stands. Some parts of the Roman aqueduct are still visible. When the Roman province of Pannonia was divided into four administrative divisions, Sopianae was named the capital of the division named Valeria.

By the 4th century, Sopianae became the capital of Valeria province and a significant early Christian centre. The early Christian necropolis in the city dates back to this era, and the Christian tombs there are unique in their architectural design, consisting of underground burial chambers below above-ground memorial chapels, and are highly decorated with Christian murals. These tombs became a UNESCO World Heritage Site in December 2000. By the end of the century, Roman rule weakened in the area, mostly due to attacks by various Barbarian peoples, more prominently the Huns.

=== Early-medieval city ===
When Charlemagne arrived in the area in 791, it was ruled by the Avars. Charlemagne, after conquering the area, annexed it to the Holy Roman Empire, where it belonged to the Diocese of Salzburg.

A document written in Salzburg in 871 is the first one mentioning the early-medieval city under the name Quinque Basilicae. During the 9th century, the city was inhabited by Slavs and Avars, and was part of the Balaton Principality, a Frankish vassal state.

=== The Hungarian city in the Middle Ages ===
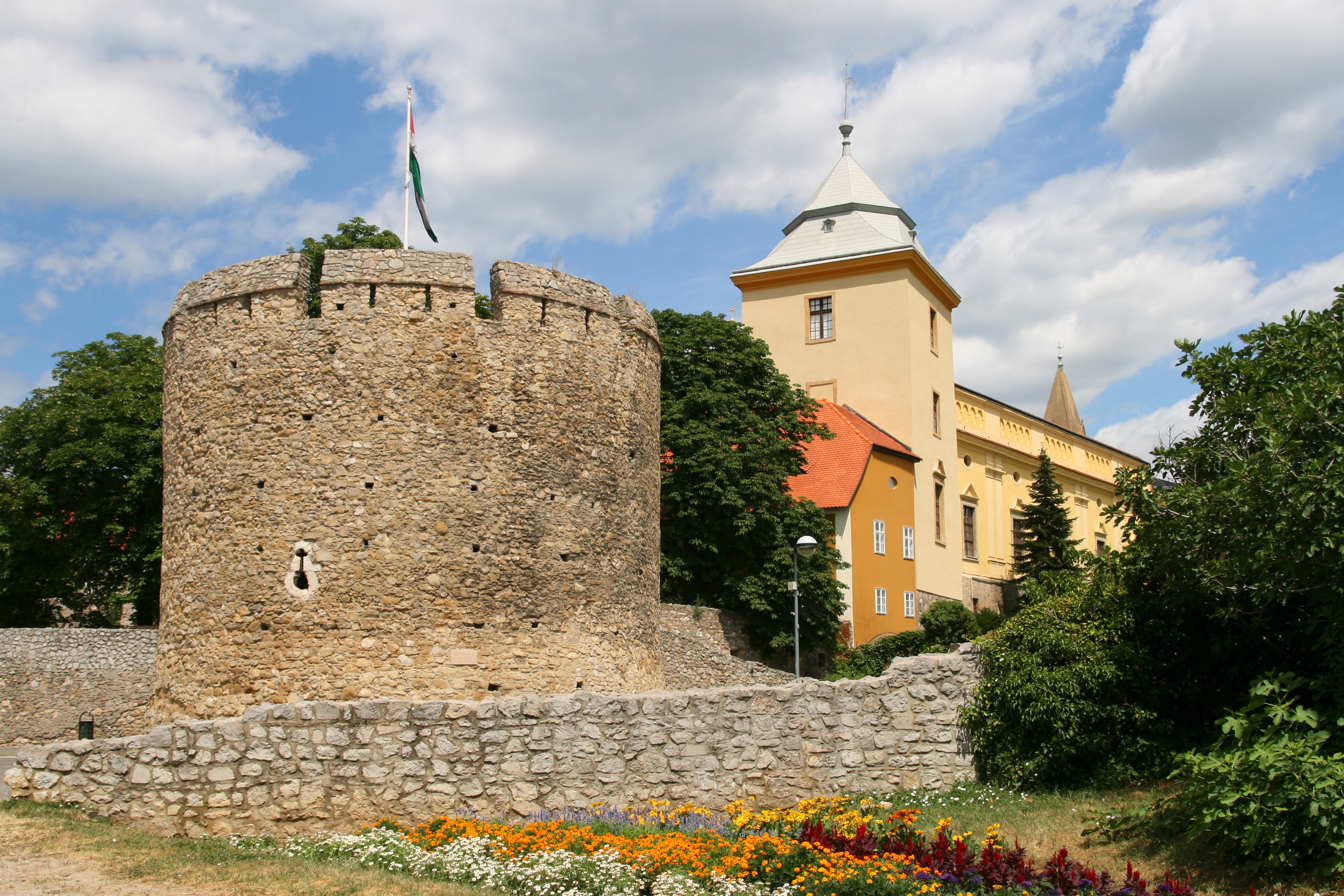
The Barbakán

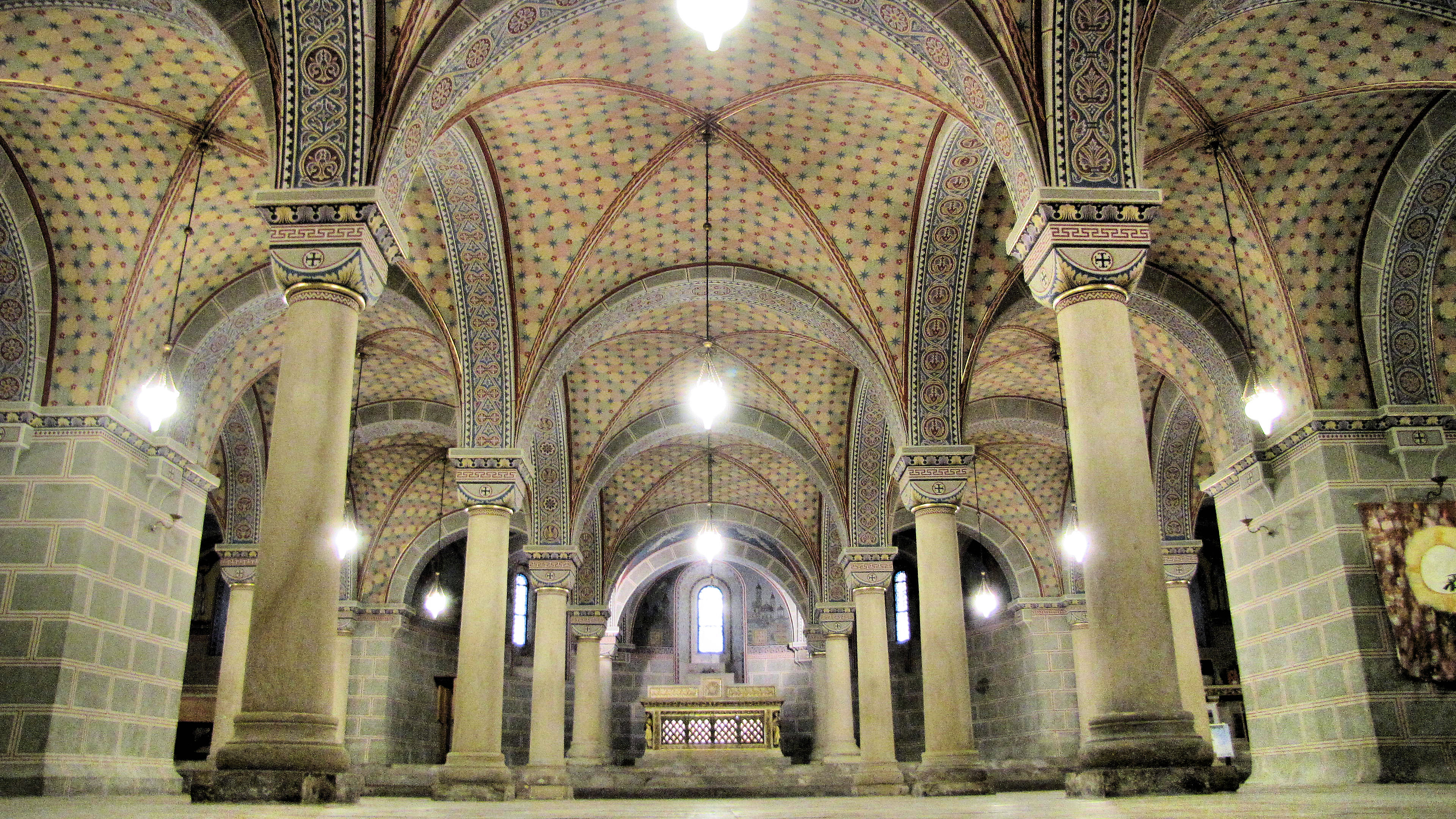
Crypt of the cathedral from the Middle Ages

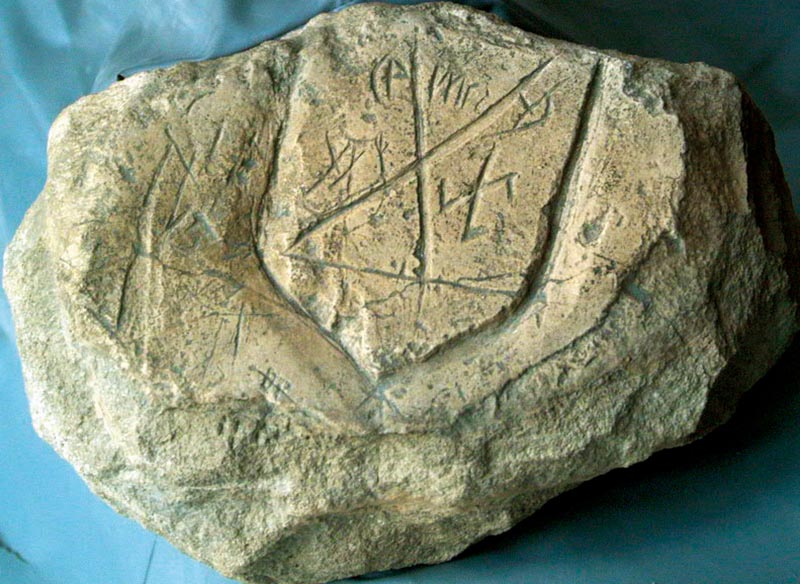
Stone shield pattern of Pécs with Old Hungarian script (circa 1250 AD)

According to György Györffy's theory of place names, after the Hungarians conquered the Carpathian Basin, they retained a semi-nomadic lifestyle, changing pastures between winter and summer. Árpád's winter quarters – clearly after his occupation of Pannonia in 900 – were perhaps in Pécs. Later, when the Comitatus of Baranya was established, the capital of the comitatus was not Pécs but a nearby castle, Baranyavár ('Baranya Castle'). Pécs, however, became an important religious centre and episcopal seat. In Latin documents, the city was mentioned as Quinque Ecclesiae. Around 1000, the area was inhabited by the Black Magyars. The Deed of Foundation of the Diocese of Pécs was issued in 1009.

The Roman Catholic Diocese of Pécs was founded in 1009 by Stephen I, and the first university in Hungary was founded in Pécs in 1367 by Louis I the Great. (The largest university, with about 34,000 students, is still based in Pécs.)

Peter Orseolo, the second king of Hungary, was buried in the cathedral in 1046. The location of his grave is unknown. This is because the cathedral burnt down shortly after Pécs hosting the 1064 Easter celebrations by King Solomon, after him making peace with his cousin, the later King Géza I. The cathedral was rebuilt in the second half of the 11th century and stands until today.

Several religious orders settled down in Pécs. The Benedictine order was the first in 1076. In 1181, there was already a hospital in the city. The first Dominican monastery of the country was built in Pécs in 1238.

During the Mongol invasion of 1241–1242, Pécs was devastated and burned to the ground. In the aftermath, the city was heavily fortified with strong stone walls.

King Louis I the Great founded a university in Pécs in 1367, following the advice of the city's bishop, William of Koppenbach, who was also the king's chancellor. It was the first university in Hungary. The founding document is almost word for word identical with that of the University of Vienna, stating that the university has the right to teach all arts and sciences, with the exception of theology.

In 1459, Janus Pannonius, the most important medieval poet of Hungary became the bishop of Pécs, and developed Pécs into one of the cultural and arts centres of the country.

=== Ottoman rule ===
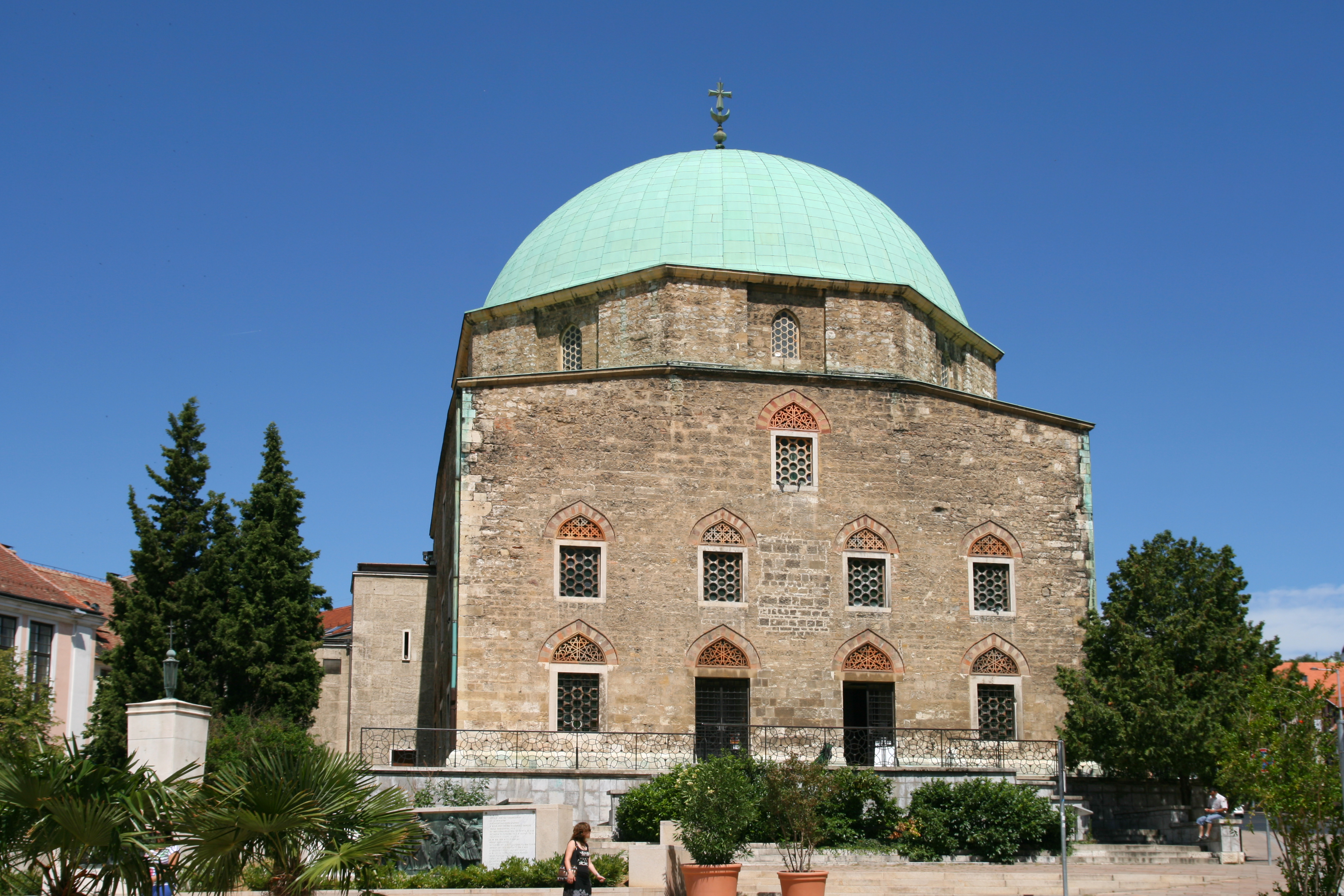
The mosque of Gázi Kászim pasa (pasha Qasim the Victorious)

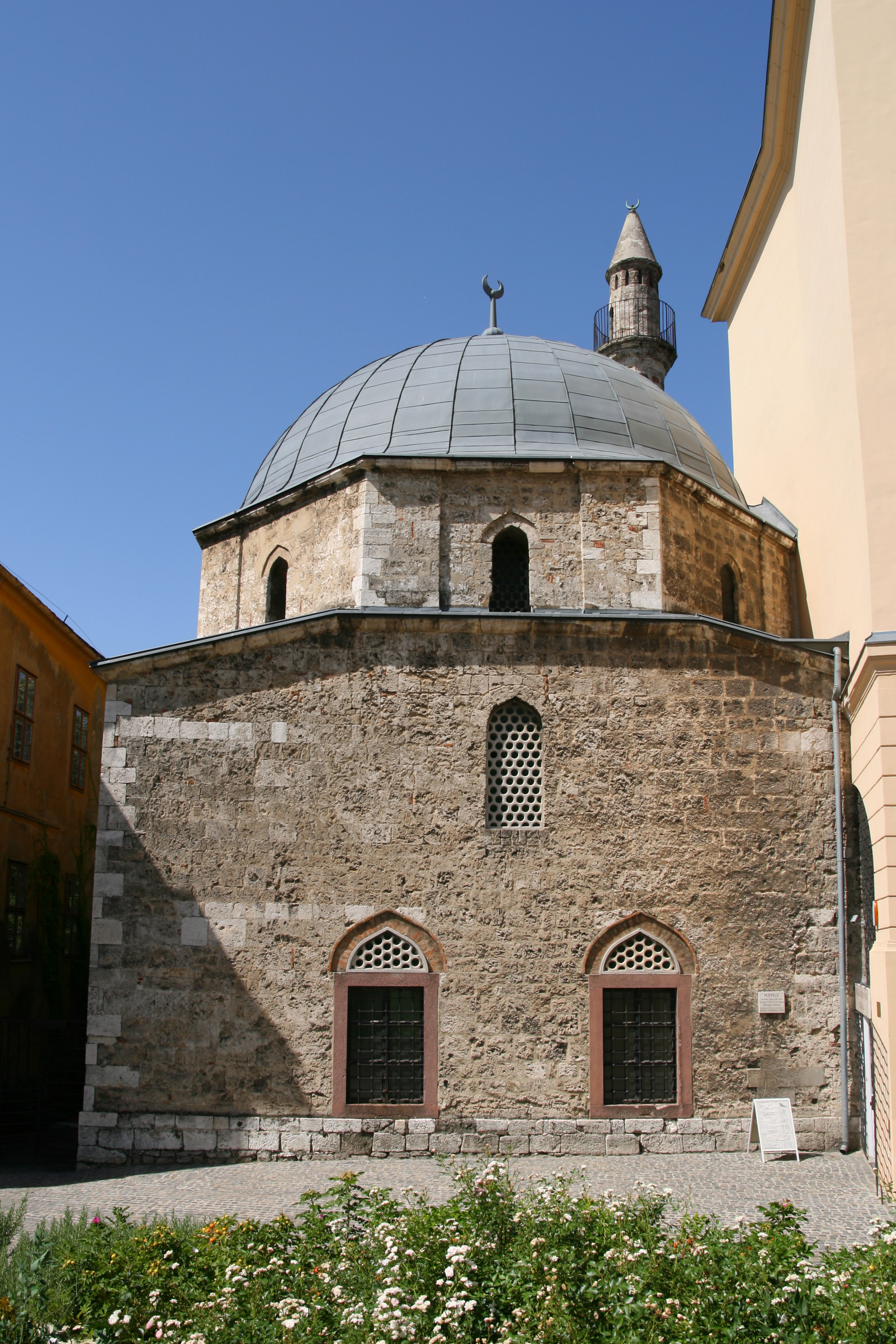
Yakovalı Hasan Paşa Mosque

After the 1526 Battle of Mohács, in which the invading Ottoman army defeated the armies of King Louis II, the armies of Suleiman occupied Pécs. Not only was a large part of the country occupied by the Ottomans, the public opinion of who should be the king of Hungary was divided, too. One party supported Ferdinand of Habsburg, the other party crowned John Zápolya in Székesfehérvár. The citizens of Pécs supported Ferdinand, but the rest of Baranya county supported John. In the summer of 1527, Ferdinand defeated the armies of Zápolya and was crowned king on 3 November. Ferdinand favoured the city because of the support of its citizens, and granted Pécs tax exemption. The city was rebuilt and fortified.

In 1529, the Ottomans captured Pécs again, and went on a campaign against Vienna. The Ottomans forced Pécs to accept King John (who was allied with them) as their ruler. John died in 1540. In 1541, the Ottomans occupied the castle of Buda and ordered Isabella, the widow of John, to cede Pécs to them, due to the city's strategic importance. The citizens of Pécs defended the city against the Ottomans and swore loyalty to Ferdinand. The emperor helped the city and defended it from further Ottoman attacks, but his advisers persuaded him into focusing more on the cities of Székesfehérvár and Esztergom instead of Pécs. Pécs was preparing for the siege, but a day before, Flemish and Walloon mercenaries fled from the city and raided the nearby lands. The next day, in June 1543, the bishop himself went to the Ottomans with the keys of the city.

After occupying the city, the Ottomans fortified it and turned it into a truly Ottoman city. The churches were turned into mosques, complete with minarets; hamams were built, Qur'an schools were founded, and there was a bazaar in place of the market. For one hundred years the city was an island of peace in a land of war. It was the central city of a sanjak, at first in the Budin Eyalet and later, as "Peçuy", in the Kanije Eyalet.

The siege of Pécs in 1664 during the Austro-Turkish War

The Ottoman era resulted in numerous landmarks, such as the mosque of Pasha Qasim the Victorious at Széchenyi Square, the tomb of İdris Baba, and the Yakovalı Hasan Paşa Mosque.

The Ottoman chronicler İbrahim Peçevi (Ibrahim of Pécs), whose work forms the main body of reference for Ottoman history between 1520 and 1640, was a native of the city.

In 1664, Croat-Hungarian nobleman Nicholas Zrínyi arrived in Pécs with his army. Since the city was well into the Ottoman territories, they knew that even if they occupied it, they could not keep it for long, so they planned only to pillage it. They ravaged and burned the city but could not occupy the castle. Mediaeval Pécs was destroyed forever, except for the wall encircling the historical city, a single bastion (Barbakán), the network of tunnels and catacombs beneath the city (partially closed down, and partially in possession of the famous Litke champagne factory, which can be visited today). Several Turkish structures also survived, namely three mosques, two minarets, remnants of a bath over the ancient Christian tombs near the cathedral, and several houses, one with a stone cannonball embedded in the wall.

View of Pécs in 1686, during Ottoman rule in Hungary

In the 1686 Siege of Pécs, the Austrian army finally recovered the city from the Ottoman Turks. After wresting the castle of Buda from Ottoman rule, the Christian armies went on to capture Pécs. The vanguard managed to break into the city and pillaged it. The Ottomans saw that they could not hold the city, burnt it and withdrew into the castle. The army led by Louis of Baden occupied the city on 14 October and destroyed the aqueduct leading to the castle. The Ottomans had no other choice but to surrender, which they did on 22 October.

The city was under martial law under the command of Karl von Thüngen. The Viennese court wanted to destroy the city first, but later they decided to keep it to counterbalance the importance of Szigetvár, which was still under Ottoman rule. Slowly the city started to prosper again, but in the 1690s two plague epidemics claimed many lives. In 1688, German settlers arrived. Only about one-quarter of the city's population was Hungarian, the others were Germans or Southern Slavs. The census of taxpayers from 1698 lists 637 families, for which Janja Živković Mandić concludes that 308 were of Croatian nationality (Catholic Croats, Racs, Šokci, Bunjevci, Illyrians, Slavs, Bosniaks) and the remaining 329 were Hungarians, Germans, Serbs or Greeks. According to same census, István Tabo mentions 171 Hungarian, 349 Slavs and 79 Germans while Đuro Šarošac mentions that at that time in the city lived 325 Croats, 139 Hungarians, 92 Germans, 53 Vlachs and 28 Serbs. According to 1698 data, South Slavs comprised more than half of the town's population. Because Hungarians were only a minority, Pécs did not support the revolution against Habsburg rule led by Francis II Rákóczi, and his armies pillaged the city in 1704.

=== Early-modern era ===
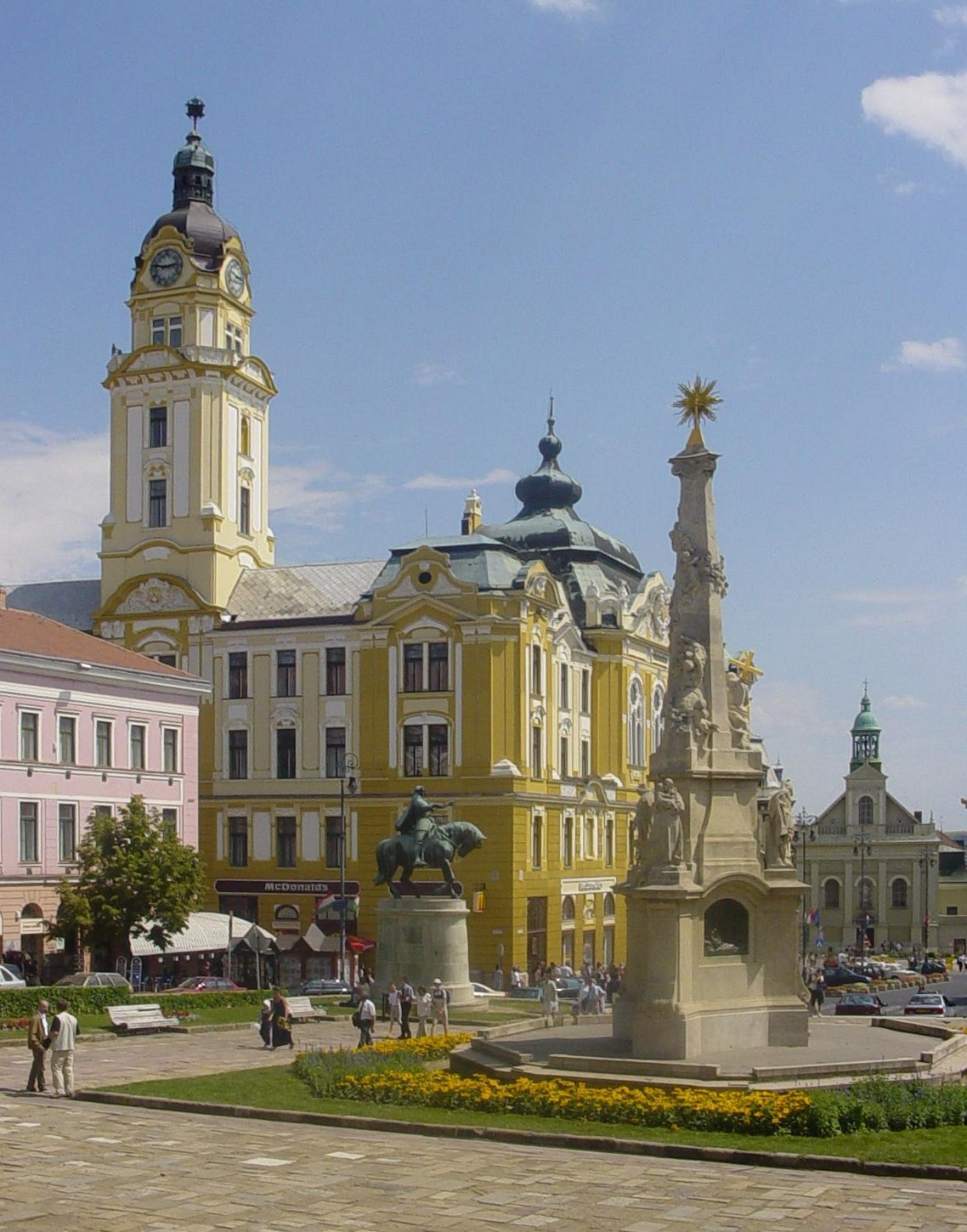
Pécs Main Square before 2009

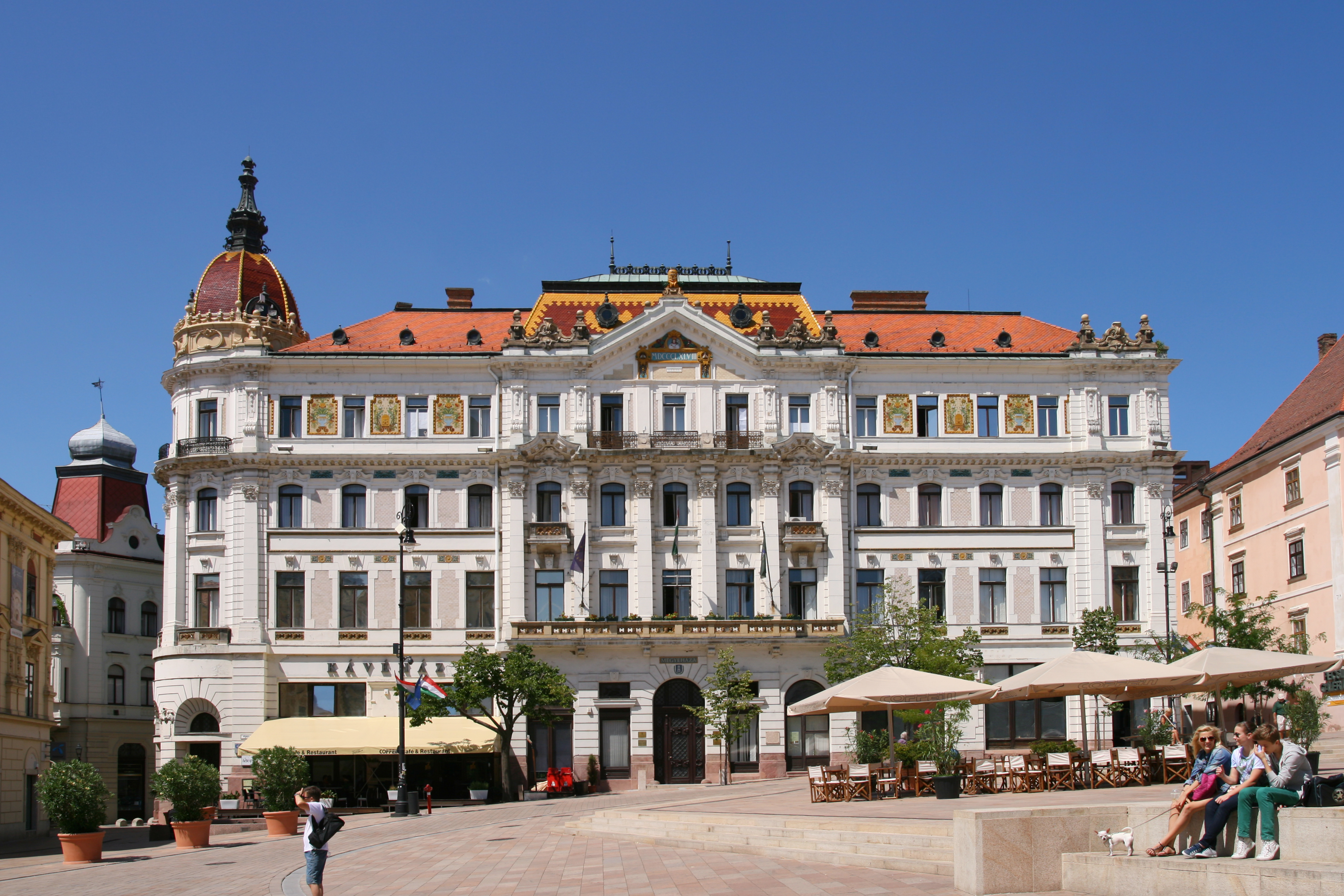
Baranya County Hall

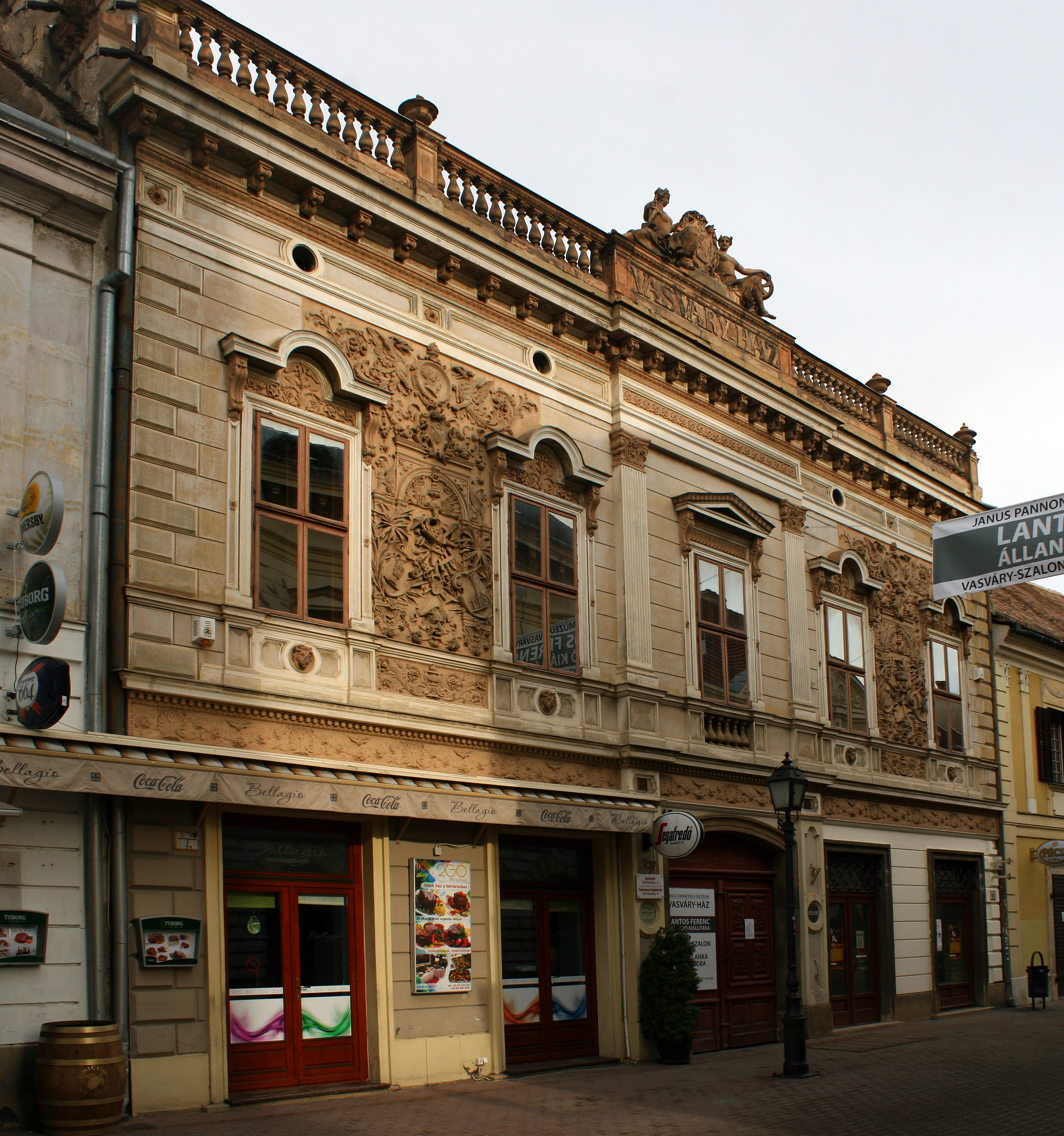
Vasváry-House

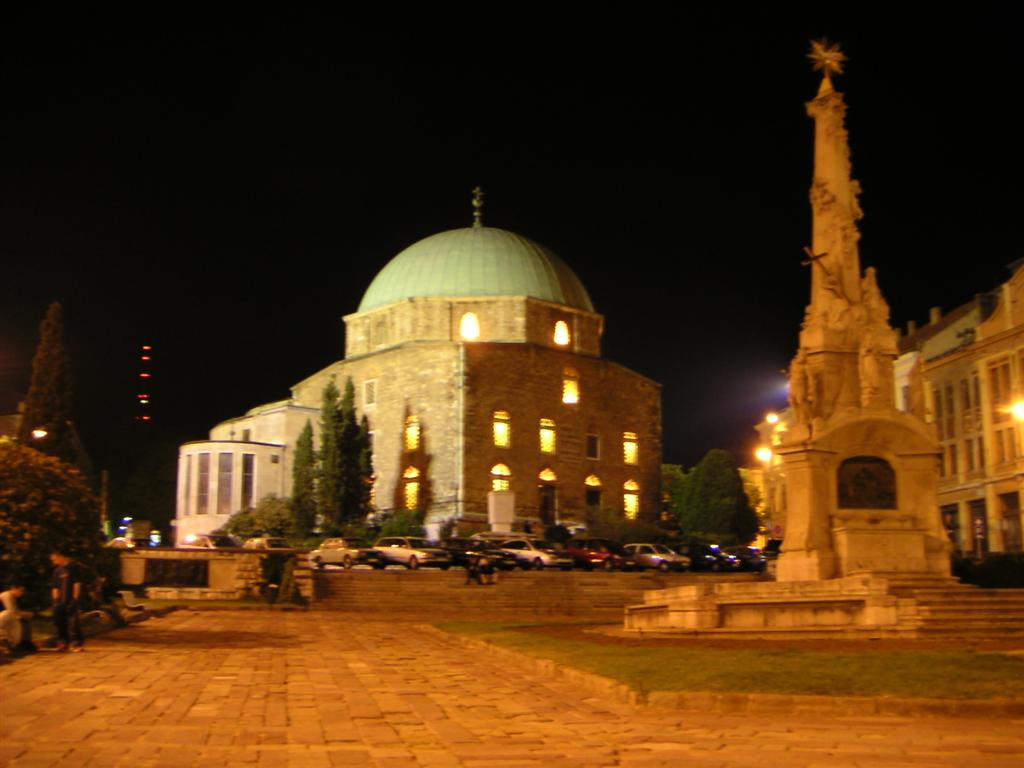
Széchenyi Square

A more peaceful era started after 1710. Industry, trade and viticulture prospered, manufactories were founded, a new city hall was built. The feudal lord of the city was the Bishop of Pécs, but the city wanted to free itself from episcopal control. Bishop George Klimó, an enlightened man (who founded the first public library of the country) would have agreed to cede his rights to the city, but the Holy See forbade him to do so. When Klimó died in 1777, Queen Maria Theresa quickly elevated Pécs to free royal town status before the new bishop was elected. This cost the city 83,315 forints.

According to the first census (held in 1787 by the order of Joseph II), there were 1,474 houses and 1,834 families in Pécs, a total of 8,853 residents, of which 133 were priests and 117 were noblemen.

In 1785, the Academy of Győr was moved to Pécs. This academy eventually evolved into a law school. The first stonework theatre of the city was built in 1839. At that time or Maria Theresia and her son Josef II, the Danube Swabians from Germany was settled in the City.

=== 19th century and later ===
The industry developed a lot in the second half of the 19th century. By 1848, there were 1,739 industrial workers. Some of the manufactures were nationally famous. The iron and paper factories were among the most modern ones of the age. Coal mining was relevant. A sugar factory and beer manufactures were built, too. The city had 14,616 residents.

During the revolution in 1848–49, Pécs was occupied by Croatian armies for a short time, but it was freed from them by Habsburg armies in January 1849.

After the Austro-Hungarian Compromise of 1867 Pécs developed, like all the other cities and towns of the country. From 1867, Pécs is connected to the nearby town Barcs by railway, and since 1882 it is also connected to Budapest. In 1913, a tram system has been founded, but it was extinguished in 1960.

At the end of World War I, Baranya county was occupied by Serbian troops, and it was not until August 1921 that Pécs could be sure that it remains part of Hungary. The University of Pressburg (modern-day Bratislava, Slovakia) was moved to Pécs after Hungary lost Pressburg according to the Treaty of Trianon.

During World War II, Pécs was captured by Soviet troops of the 3rd Ukrainian Front on 29 November 1944 in the course of the Budapest Offensive. The city suffered only minor damages, even though a large tank-battle took place 20–25 kilometres (12–16 miles) south of the city, close to the Villány area late in the war, when the advancing Red Army fought its way towards Austria. Until the end of World War II, the majority Inhabitants was Danube Swabians. Some of the former German settlers was expelled to Germany and Austria in 1945-1948, under the 1945 Potsdam Agreement. Germans of Hungary are still a minority in the City.

A history of Hungary from 1945-1990, "under Soviet domination" can be found in A Concise History of Hungary. After the war, development became fast again, and the city grew, absorbing several nearby towns. In the 1980s, Pécs already had 180,000 inhabitants.

Historical population
Year	Pop.	±%
1870	30,821	—
1890	43,869	+42.3%
1900	53,721	+22.5%
1910	60,237	+12.1%
1920	58,808	−2.4%
1930	74,395	+26.5%
1941	88,473	+18.9%
1949	88,302	−0.2%
1960	114,655	+29.8%
1970	149,253	+30.2%
1980	168,715	+13.0%
1990	170,039	+0.8%
2001	162,489	−4.4%
2011	156,049	−4.0%
2022	139,647	−10.5%

After the end of Socialist era (1989–1990), Pécs and its county, like many other areas, were hit hard by the changes, the unemployment rate was high, the mines and several factories were closed, and the war in neighboring Yugoslavia in the 1990s affected the tourism.

Pécs was also the centre of the Nordic Support Group (NSG) consisting of units from Denmark, Norway, Sweden, Finland, and Poland, as part of the IFOR and later SFOR NATO deployments, after the Dayton Agreement and following peace in former Yugoslavia; the first units were deployed to Pécs in late 1995 and early 1996. The NSG handled the relaying of supply, personnel and other logistical tasks between the participating countries and their deployed forces in Bosnia-Herzegovina.

In 1998 Pécs was given the UNESCO prize "Cities for Peace" for maintaining its cultural minorities, and also for its tolerant and helping attitude toward refugees of the Yugoslav Wars.

In 2007 Pécs was third, and in 2008 it was second "Livable City" (The LivCom Awards) in the category of cities between 75,000 and 200,000 inhabitants.

In 2010, Pécs was selected to be the European Capital of Culture alongside Essen and Istanbul. The city motto is "The Borderless City". After receiving the title major renewal started in the city. Renewed public places, streets, squares and neighbourhoods, new cultural centres, a concert hall, a new library and centre and a cultural quarter were designed.

== Main sights ==
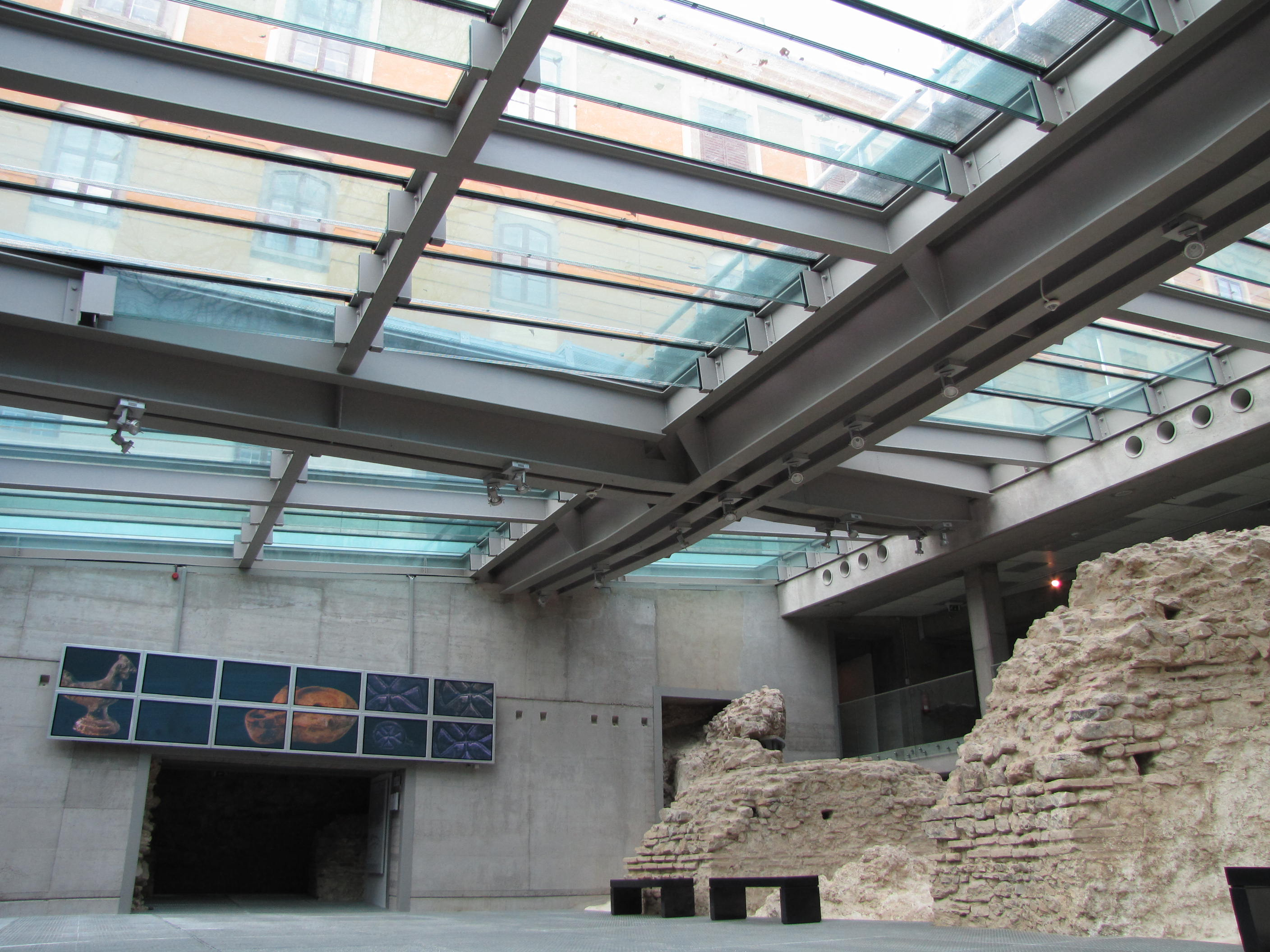
Cella Septichora

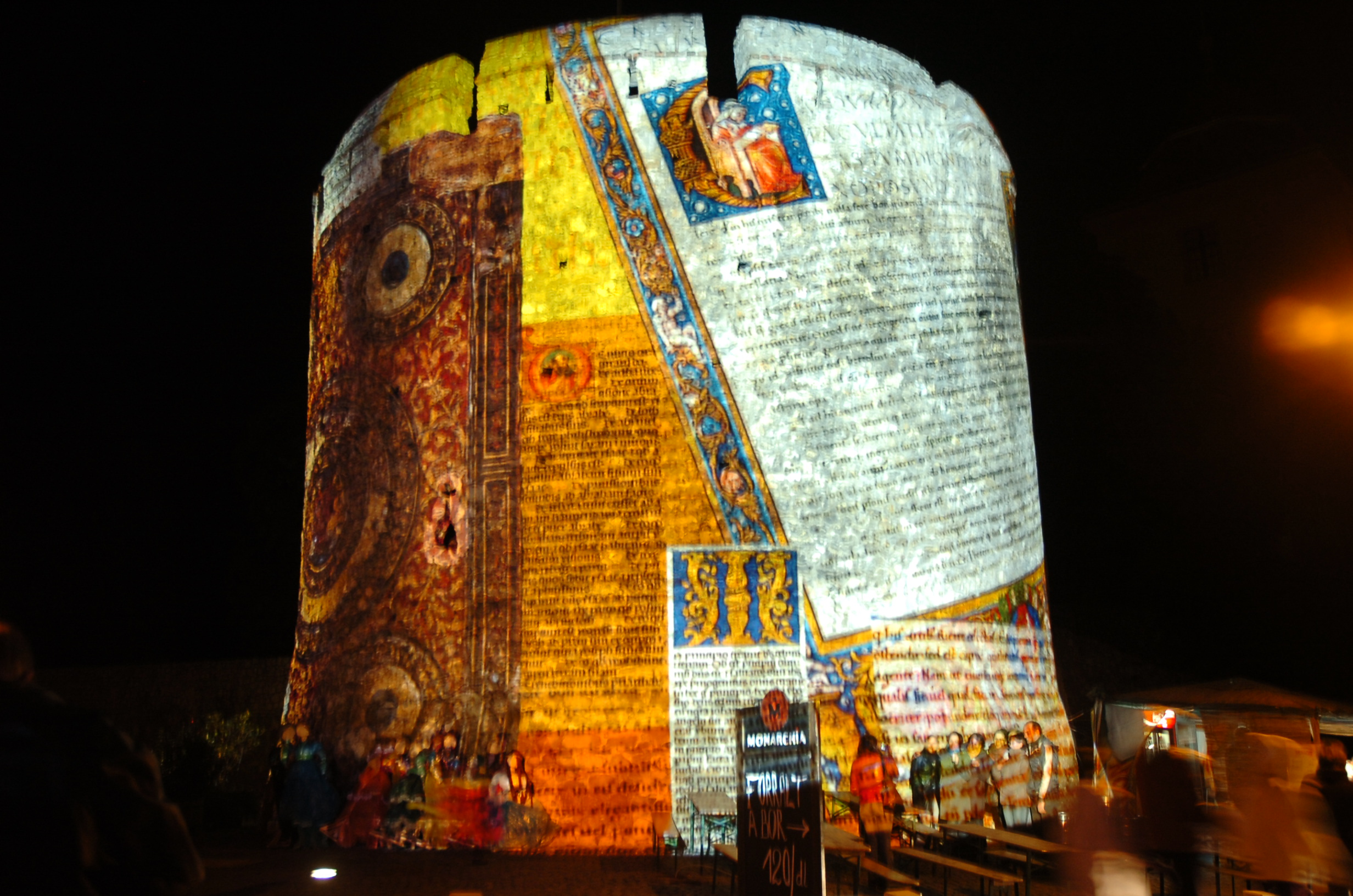
The Barbakán

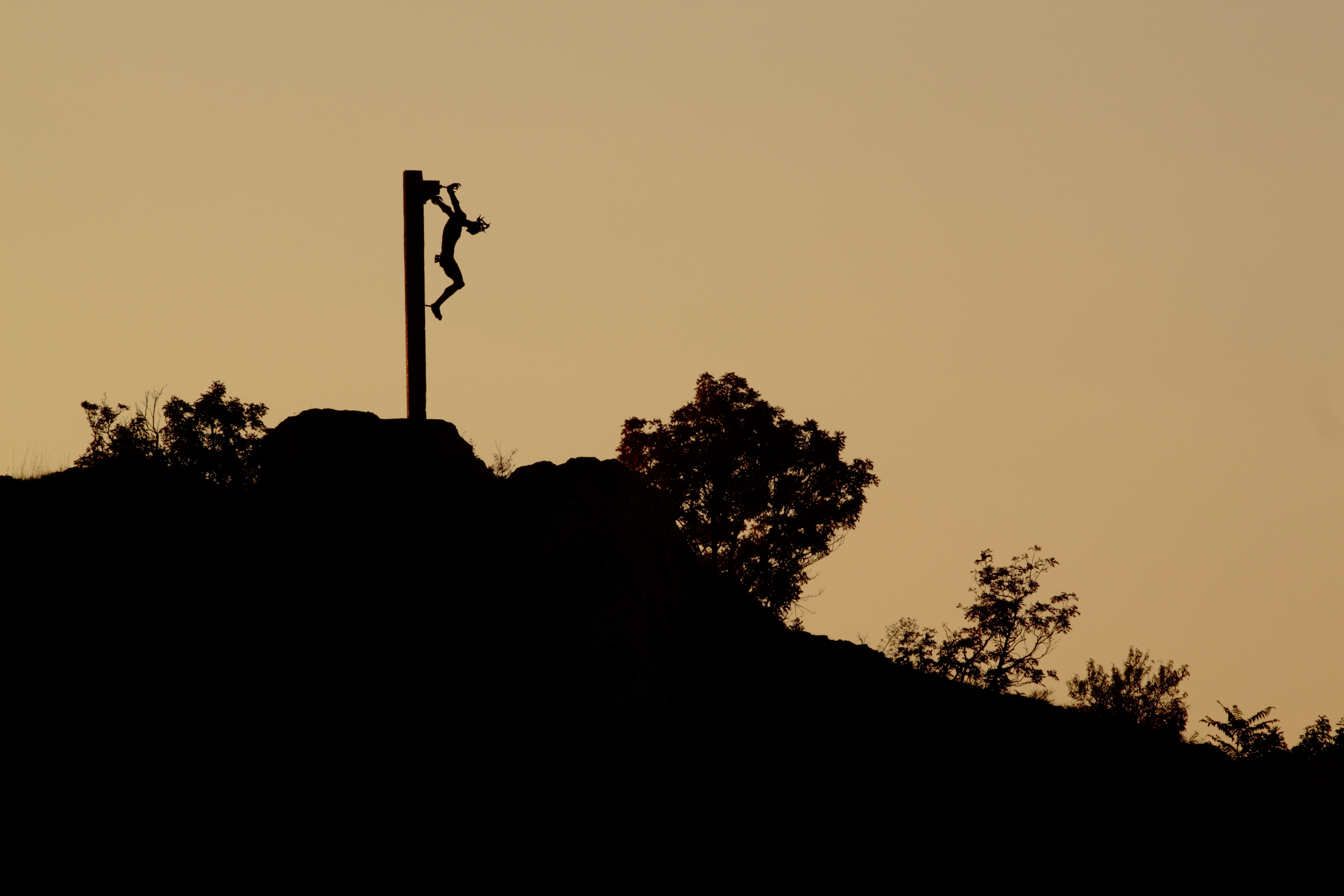
The cross at Tettye

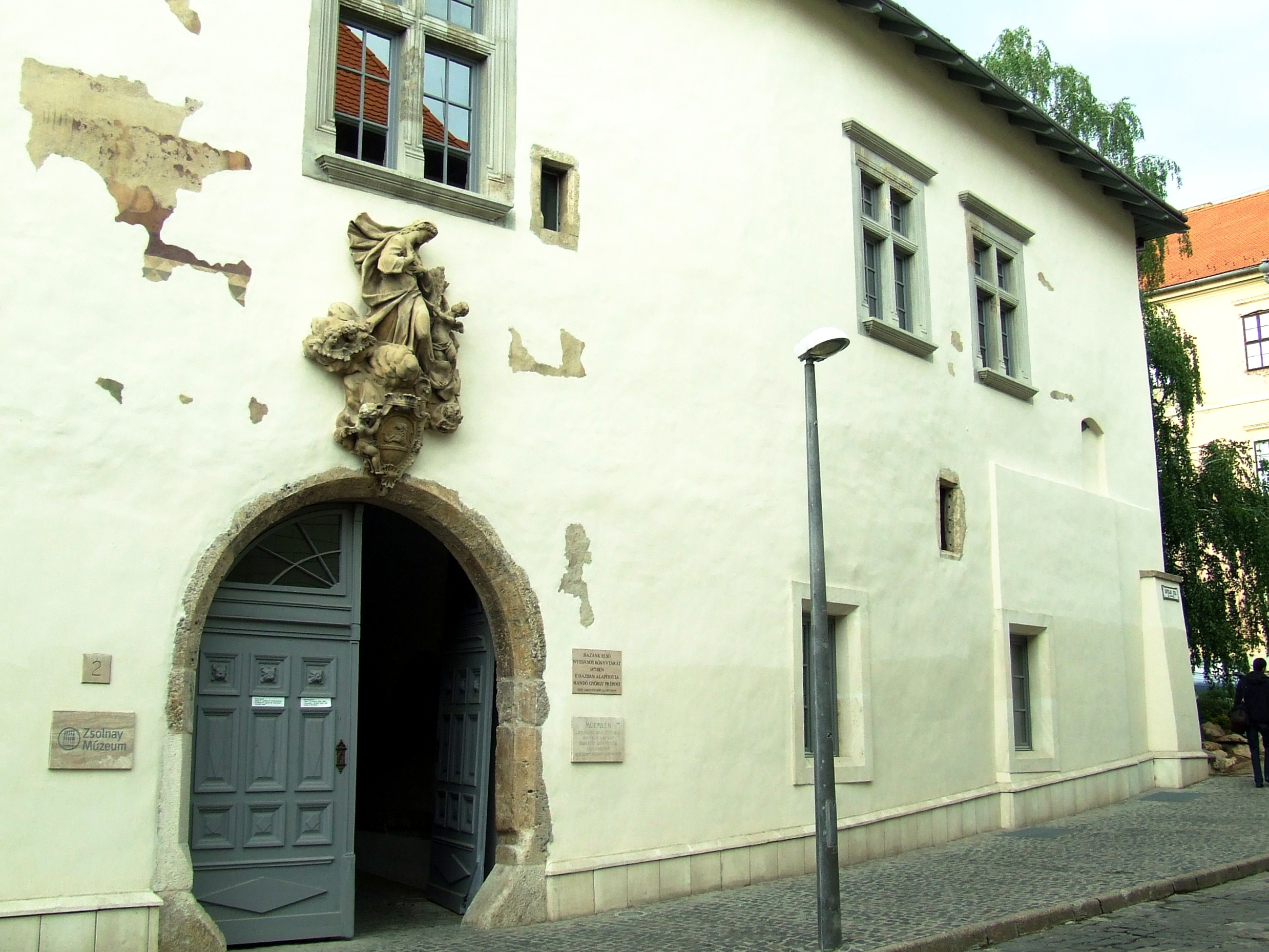
Zsolnay Museum. The House from the 13th Century.

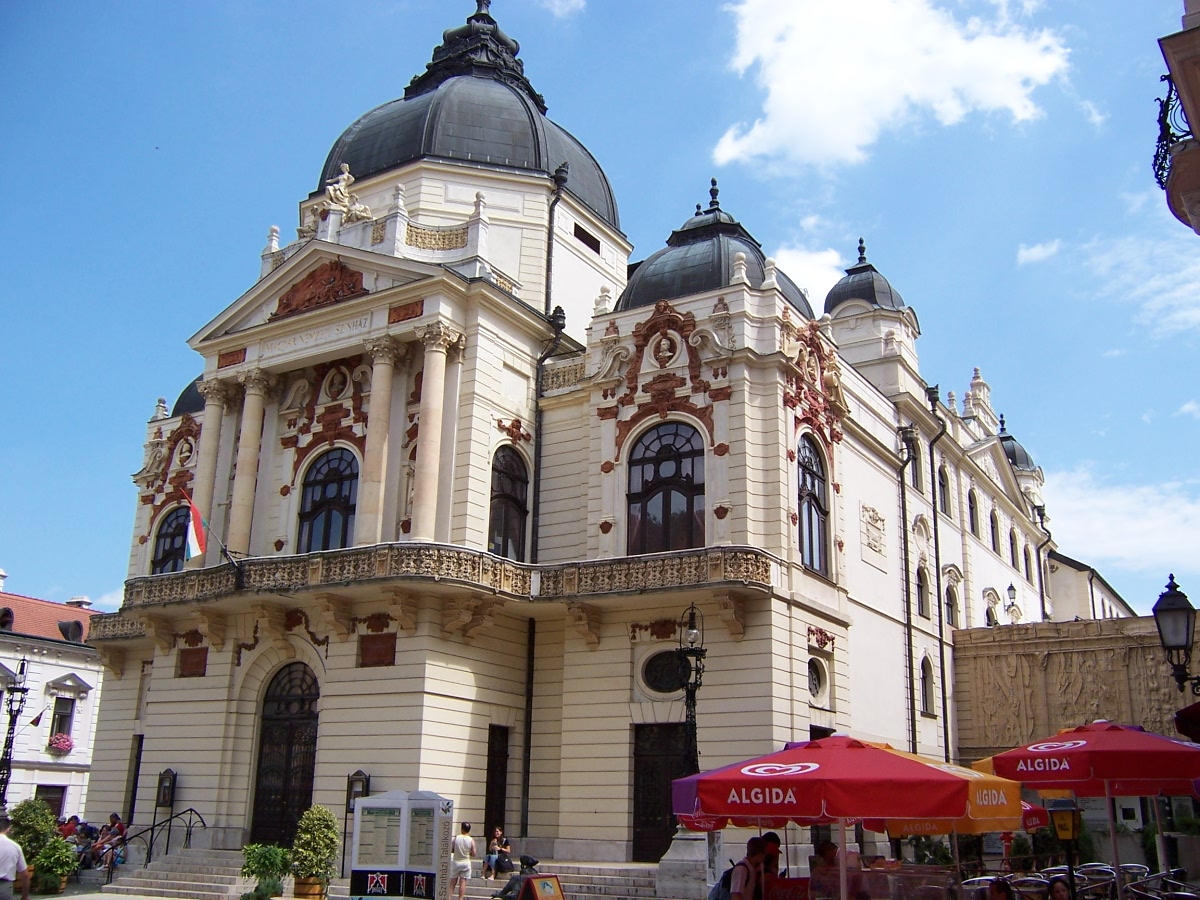
National Theatre in Pécs.

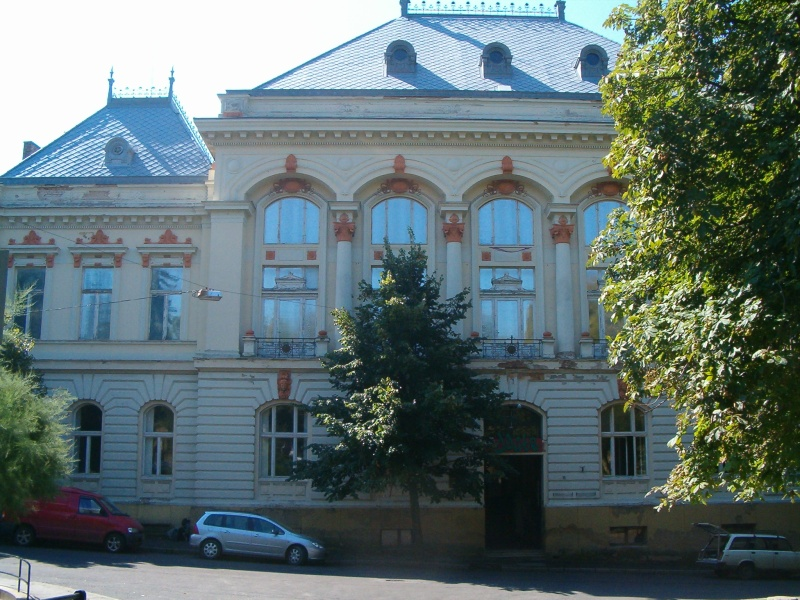
Csontváry Museum

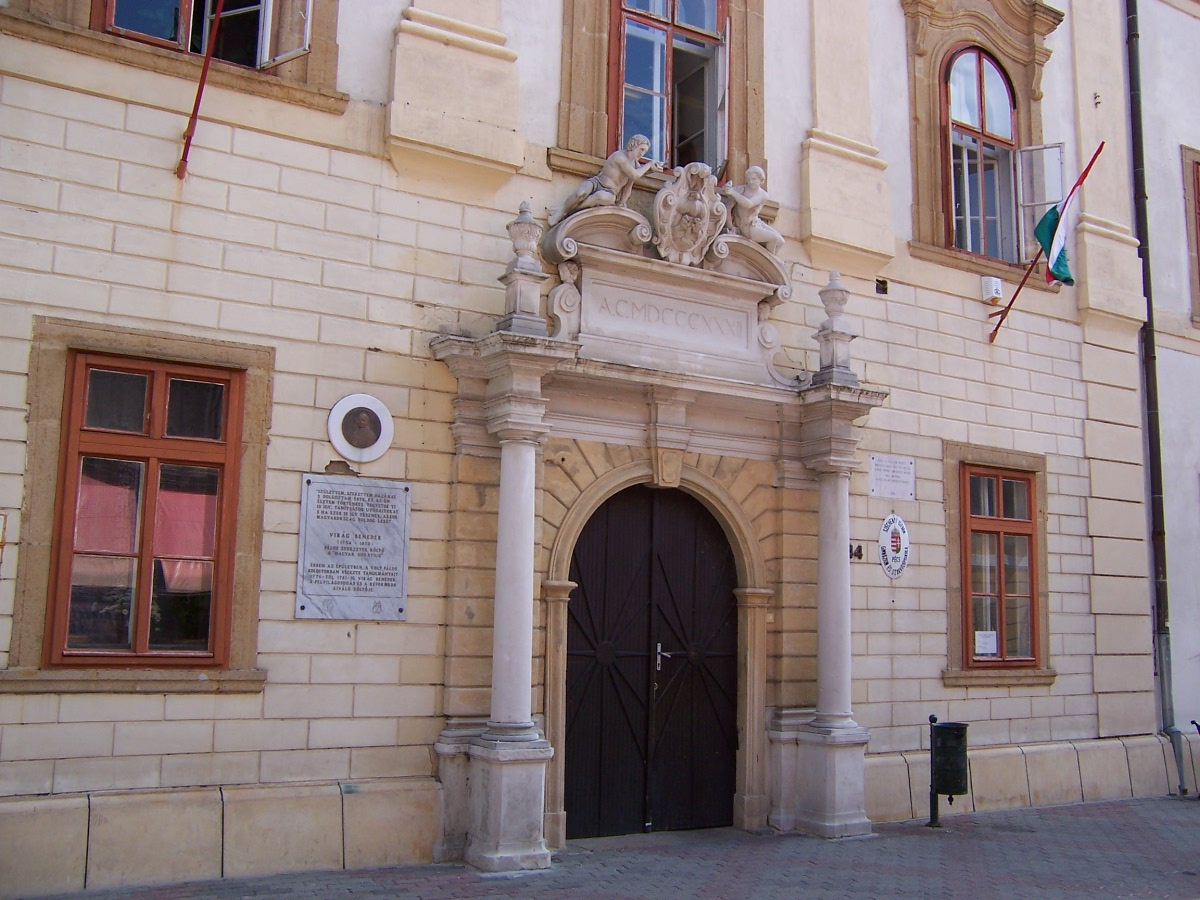
Lyceum Church in Király Street

A good example of the city's history and interesting past can be seen in the main square, where the Gazi Kasim Mosque still stands, and, although consecrated as a church following the retreat of the Ottoman Turks centuries ago, the crescent moon of Islam is still visible on the cupola, surmounted by a cross. Indeed, Pécs is the richest town in Hungary in terms of Turkish architecture, with the ruins of Memi Pasa's Baths and the mausoleum of miracle worker Idris Baba, just two other notable remains. The Yakovalı Hasan Paşa Mosque, dating from the mid-1600s, still functions as an active mosque today. It is open to the public except during Friday services from 2.30 to 3.30 pm.

- The Early Christian Necropolis of Pécs, extensive Roman tombs and mausoleums dating from around the 4th century, and a UNESCO World Heritage Site).
- Cella Septichora (4th century)
- The Cathedral (11th century, renovated in the 19th century).
- Hungarian Bishop's Palace (12th century)
- University of Pécs (1367), building of the Faculty of Science and Faculty of Humanities in Ifjúság street. It includes a Botanical Garden.
- Klimo Library (1774). The first public library in Hungary, which was founded by bishop George Klimo.
- Barbakán "Tower" (15th century)
- Ruins in Tettye (1505–1521)
- Széchenyi square (main square)
- The mosque of pasha Qasim (1543–1546). Originally gothic Church: St. Bertalan Cathedral from the 13th century
- Yakovalı Hasan Paşa Mosque (17th century)
- Downtown (Houses from the Middle Ages. Baroque, Classicism, Rococo, Art Nouveau Houses)
- Nádor Hotel (1846) in Széchenyi Square
- County House in Széchenyi Square
- City Hall in Széchenyi Square
- Synagogue (1869)
- Building of the Hungarian Academy of Sciences (1884)
- National Theatre of Pécs (Nemzeti Színház), inaugurated in 1895.
- Eosin glaze of Zsolnay fountain
- Posta (Post) Palace
- Hungaricum House
- Janus Pannonius Museum
- Renaissance Museum
- Csontváry Museum
- Zsolnay Museum
- Zsolnay Mausoleum
- Victor Vasarely Museum
- Amerigo Tot Museum
- Ethnographic Museum in Pécs
- Natural History Museum in Pécs
- Szerecsen Chemist's Museum
- Gallery of Pécs
- Museum Street
- Zsolnay Mausoleum
- Bóbita (punch and judy show)
- Janus (Pannonius) Theatre
- Croatian Theatre in Pécs
- Third Theatre
- Zoological Garden in Pécs
- Love padlocks
- Magasház (formerly – was deconstructed in 2016)
- TV-Tower in Mecsek Mountain (1960)

== Demographics ==
The majority of the citizens with 84.0% are Hungarians according to the 2011 census. The city's Germans are the largest minority with 4.2%. Followed by the Roma (2.0%), the Croats (1.2%) and the Romanians (0.2%).

The largest religious group is the Catholics with 39.7% Roman Catholic and 0.3% Greek Catholic. The second largest denomination is the Calvinists (5.2%), the third the Lutherans (1.3%). 27.8% of the population is non-religious.

Due to the number of international students studying and living in Pécs, a notable diversity of non-permanent citizens could be obviously seen around the city.

== Climate ==
Pécs's climate is classified as humid subtropical climate (Köppen Cfa). Among them, the annual average temperature is 11.5 °C (52.7 °F), the hottest months are July and August with 30.0 °C (86.0 °F), and the coldest month is January with 0.4 °C (32.7 °F). The annual precipitation is 670.9 millimetres (26.41 in), of which June is the wettest with 82.8 millimetres (3.26 in), while January is the driest with only 31.2 millimetres (1.23 in). The extreme temperature throughout the year ranged from −27.0 °C (−16.6 °F) on 23 January 1942 to 41.3 °C (106.3 °F) on 7 July 1950.

Climate data for Pécs, 1991−2020 normals, extremes 1901-2020
Month	Jan	Feb	Mar	Apr	May	Jun	Jul	Aug	Sep	Oct	Nov	Dec	Year
Record high °C (°F)	17.0 (62.6)	20.9 (69.6)	26.4 (79.5)	29.9 (85.8)	33.8 (92.8)	38.9 (102.0)	41.3 (106.3)	39.6 (103.3)	35.2 (95.4)	29.4 (84.9)	24.4 (75.9)	19.5 (67.1)	41.3 (106.3)
Mean daily maximum °C (°F)	3.5 (38.3)	6.2 (43.2)	11.5 (52.7)	17.3 (63.1)	21.8 (71.2)	25.6 (78.1)	27.7 (81.9)	27.6 (81.7)	22.2 (72.0)	16.6 (61.9)	9.9 (49.8)	4.0 (39.2)	16.2 (61.2)
Daily mean °C (°F)	0.4 (32.7)	2.1 (35.8)	6.6 (43.9)	11.9 (53.4)	16.4 (61.5)	20.2 (68.4)	22.0 (71.6)	22.0 (71.6)	16.9 (62.4)	11.7 (53.1)	6.1 (43.0)	1.2 (34.2)	11.5 (52.7)
Mean daily minimum °C (°F)	−2.4 (27.7)	−1.2 (29.8)	2.4 (36.3)	6.9 (44.4)	11.3 (52.3)	14.9 (58.8)	16.5 (61.7)	16.5 (61.7)	12.2 (54.0)	7.5 (45.5)	3.1 (37.6)	−1.4 (29.5)	7.2 (45.0)
Record low °C (°F)	−27.0 (−16.6)	−24.1 (−11.4)	−16.2 (2.8)	−6.9 (19.6)	−2.6 (27.3)	0.8 (33.4)	5.4 (41.7)	3.4 (38.1)	0.4 (32.7)	−9.0 (15.8)	−13.0 (8.6)	−22.1 (−7.8)	−27.0 (−16.6)
Average precipitation mm (inches)	31.2 (1.23)	37.4 (1.47)	33.6 (1.32)	43.6 (1.72)	81.3 (3.20)	82.8 (3.26)	69.4 (2.73)	63.5 (2.50)	71.6 (2.82)	57.3 (2.26)	51.8 (2.04)	47.4 (1.87)	670.9 (26.41)
Average precipitation days (≥ 1.0 mm)	6.1	6.9	5.8	6.8	9.4	8.5	7.6	6.6	7.6	6.6	7.9	7.5	87.3
Average relative humidity (%)	82.1	75.3	66.6	62.1	65.6	66.8	63.4	63.0	68.3	74.7	82.3	84.8	71.3
Mean monthly sunshine hours	68.2	92.4	145.7	186.0	235.6	258.0	294.5	266.6	207.0	164.3	81.0	58.9	2,058.2
Source 1: NOAA
Source 2: HungaroMet (Extremes) Hong Kong Observatory (sun 1961-1990)

== Economy ==
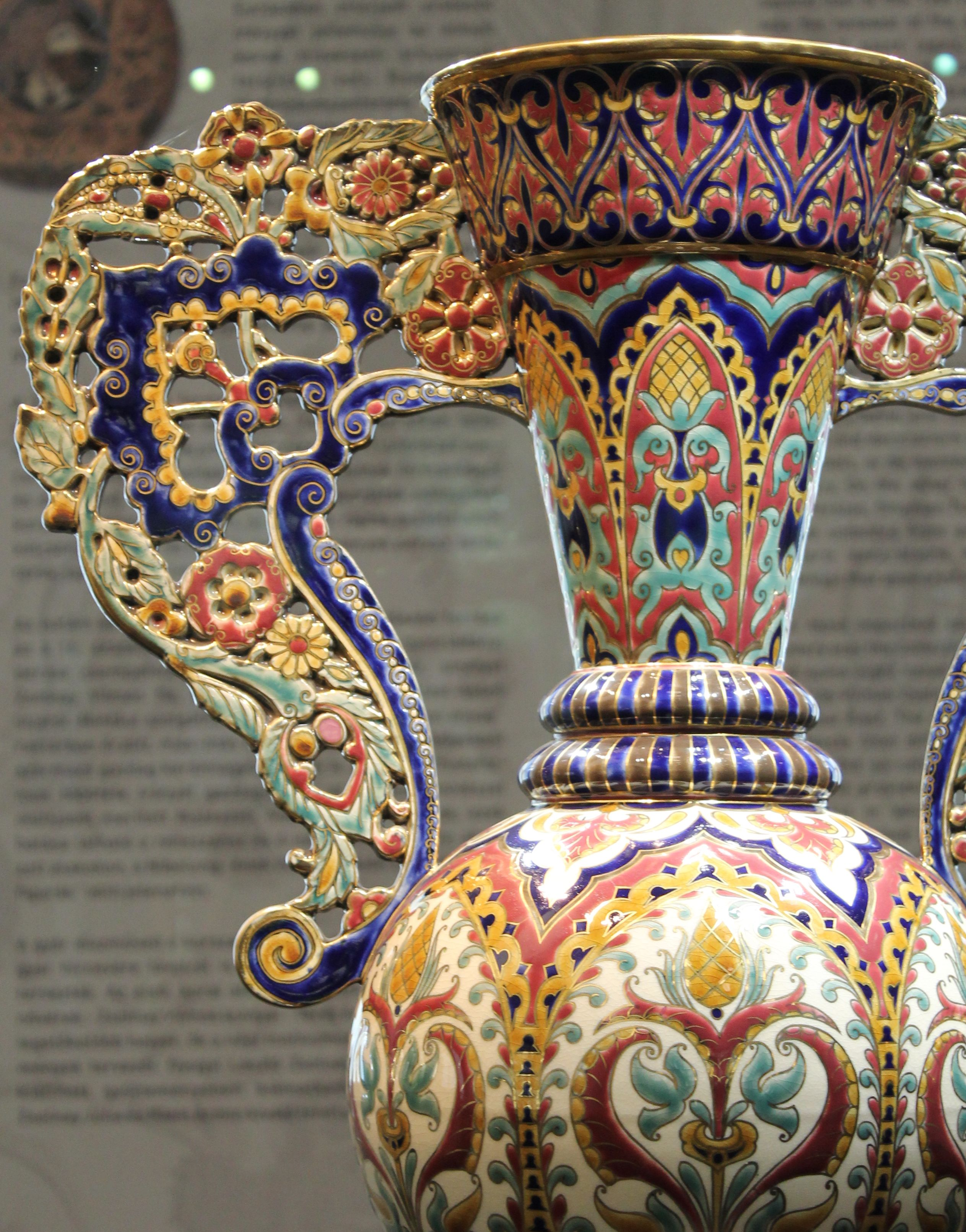
The most known product of Pécs is the Zsolnay Porcelain - Alhambra vase by Tádé Sikorski (1884)

Historically Pécs was well known in Hungary for its industry with several factories, but after the fall of the Iron Curtain many have not managed the economic transition well and went bankrupt (e.g. Pécsi Kesztyűgyár, Pécsi Bőrgyár, Littke Pezsgőgyár etc.). Until some years ago, it had a coal and uranium mine, now only its sand mine exists and is operated by the Hungarian-owned Quartz mining company.

Pécs is known for the porcelain factory, the Zsolnay porcelain.The walls and roofs of several public and private buildings in the city are decorated with the company's porcelains contributing to Pécs's unique cityscape.

The Pécsi Sörfőzde (Pécs Brewery) is one of the four main Hungarian breweries (the others being Dreher Breweries, Borsod Brewery, Heineken Hungária), but the only one of them owned fully by Hungarians. It produces a special beer, that is known for not being strained before bottling.

The Hungarian textilmanufacturer Rovitex Hungária, the American crane manufacturer Terex, the Hungarian scale manufacturer Pécsi Mérlegstúdió, the Hungarian furniture manufacturer Megyeri Bútor, the Hungarian cutting-tool manufacturer FORSZ, the German switchboard manufacturer HB-Kapcsolószekrénygyártó (part of the Bader Gruppe), the Hungarian recycling company Alcufer, the Hungarian agricultural vehiclemanufacturer HIDROT, the Hungarian animal husbandry tool manufacturer Önitató, the tobacco factory Pécsi Dohánygyár (owned by British American Tobacco), the Hungarian automotive spare parts manufacturer Matro, the Hungarian safe manufacturer Strauss Metal, the Hungarian packaging machine manufacturer SOMAPAK, the Hungarian plastics producer Termoplast, the Bocz Printing House, the Hungarian pickles manufacturer Babina, the Hungarian plastic product manufacturer Karsai Pécs, the Hungarian metal manufacturer Riner Metal based there and have their production facilities in the city.

There is a gradual development of modern high-tech industry, with Finnish electronics manufacturing company Elcoteq the largest industrial employer in the city, the Hungarian Z Elektronika electronics manufacturer and the Hungarian TG Netcom IT network manufacturer.

The German transportation company, Dachser has a logistics centre in Pécs.

The Biokom waste management and recycling company (owned by the city) is responsible for the transport and recycling of waste in the whole territory of Pécs and the surrounding areas. The energy used in the settlement is produced mainly by the two biomass power plants of Pannonpower (part of Veolia) which consists of a 49,9 MW woodchip-fired and a 35 MW agricultural by-product-fired powerplants. The country's largest solar cell field is also in Pécs, thanks to the city's southern location and longer sunny hours, which can produce about 10 MW energy a year. The solar power plant is operated by MVM Hungarowind (part of the MVM Group).

The Expo Center Pécs Exhibition and Conference Centre provides place for international exhibitions and conferences.

== Education ==
The University of Pécs was founded by Louis I of Hungary in 1367. It is the oldest university in Hungary, and is among the first European universities. In the recent past it used to be divided in two universities, one for Medicine and Orthodontics (POTE) and a larger one for other studies: JPTE (Janus Pannonius Tudományegyetem). The POTE (Pécs University Medical School, now known as the Medical School) has a large English program for general medicine and dentistry (with students from America, Asia, Africa, and European countries - including many Scandinavians) and a new German program. On 1 January 2000 these universities were combined under the name University of Pécs (acronym: PTE - Pécsi Tudományegyetem - University of Pécs). Nowadays, the University of Pécs has become the most internationalized university in Hungary with around 5000 international students out of the total of approximately 20000 students (around 25%).

== Politics ==
The current mayor of Pécs is Attila Péterffy (Pécs Jövője, Öt Torony).

The local Municipal Assembly, elected at the 2019 local government elections, is made up of 26 members (1 Mayor, 18 Individual constituencies councillors and 7 Compensation List councillors) divided into this political parties and alliances: Fidesz policies in Pécs have included a law making homelessness illegal (2014) and an official call to property owners not to make space available for an NGO supported by OSF (2017).

Party	Seats	Current Municipal Assembly
Pécs Jövője (Note: Supported by Opposition coalition.)	18	M
Fidesz-KDNP-ÖPE	7	
Politics Can Be Different	1	

=== List of mayors ===
List of City Mayors from 1990:

Member	Party	Term of office
Zoltán Krippl	SZDSZ	1990–1994
Zsolt Páva	Fidesz	1994–1998
László Toller	MSZP	1998–2006
Péter Tasnádi	MSZP	2006–2009
Zsolt Páva	Fidesz	2009–2019
Attila Péterffy	Independent	2019–

== Transport ==
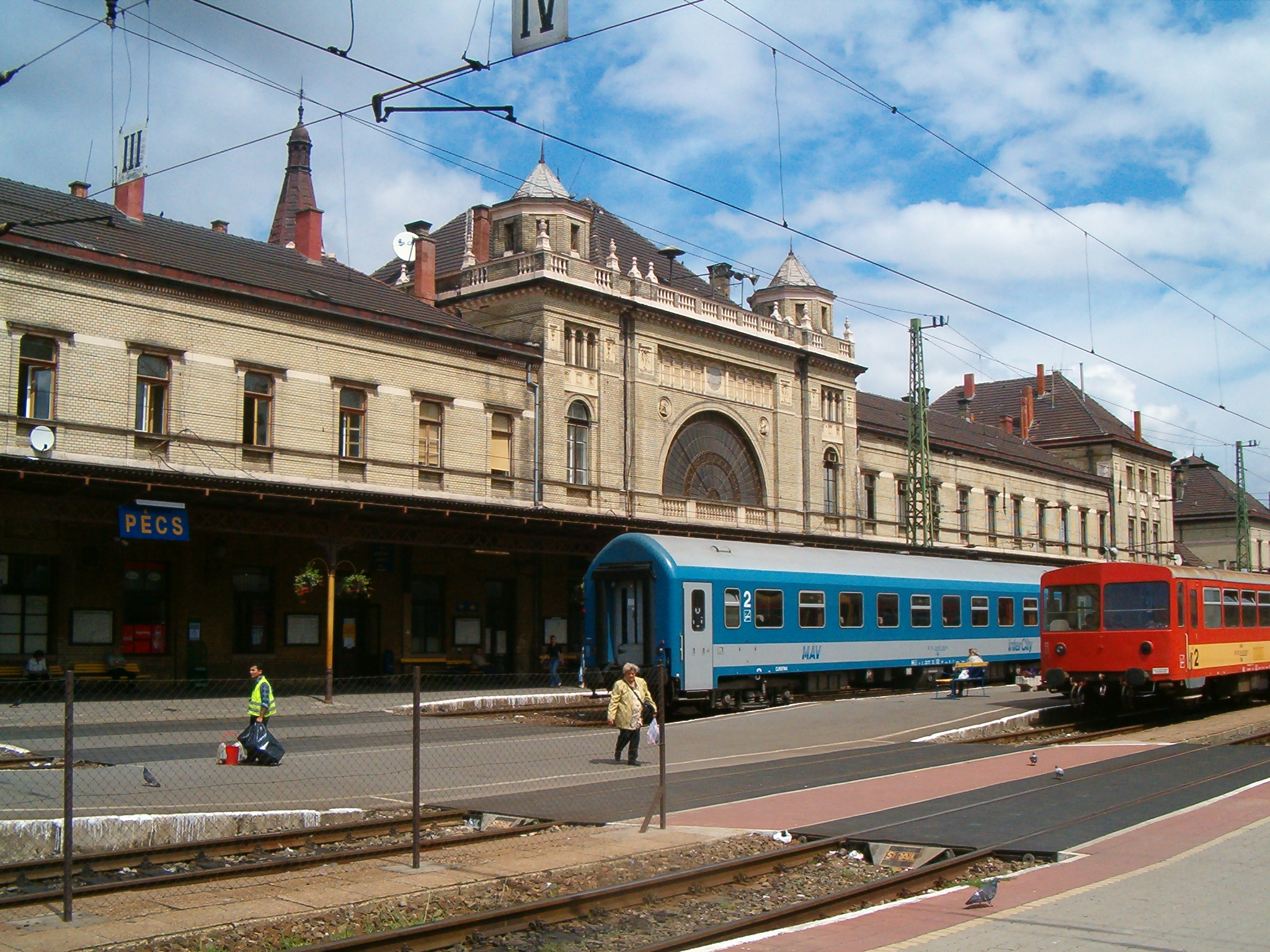
Trains at Pécs Central Station

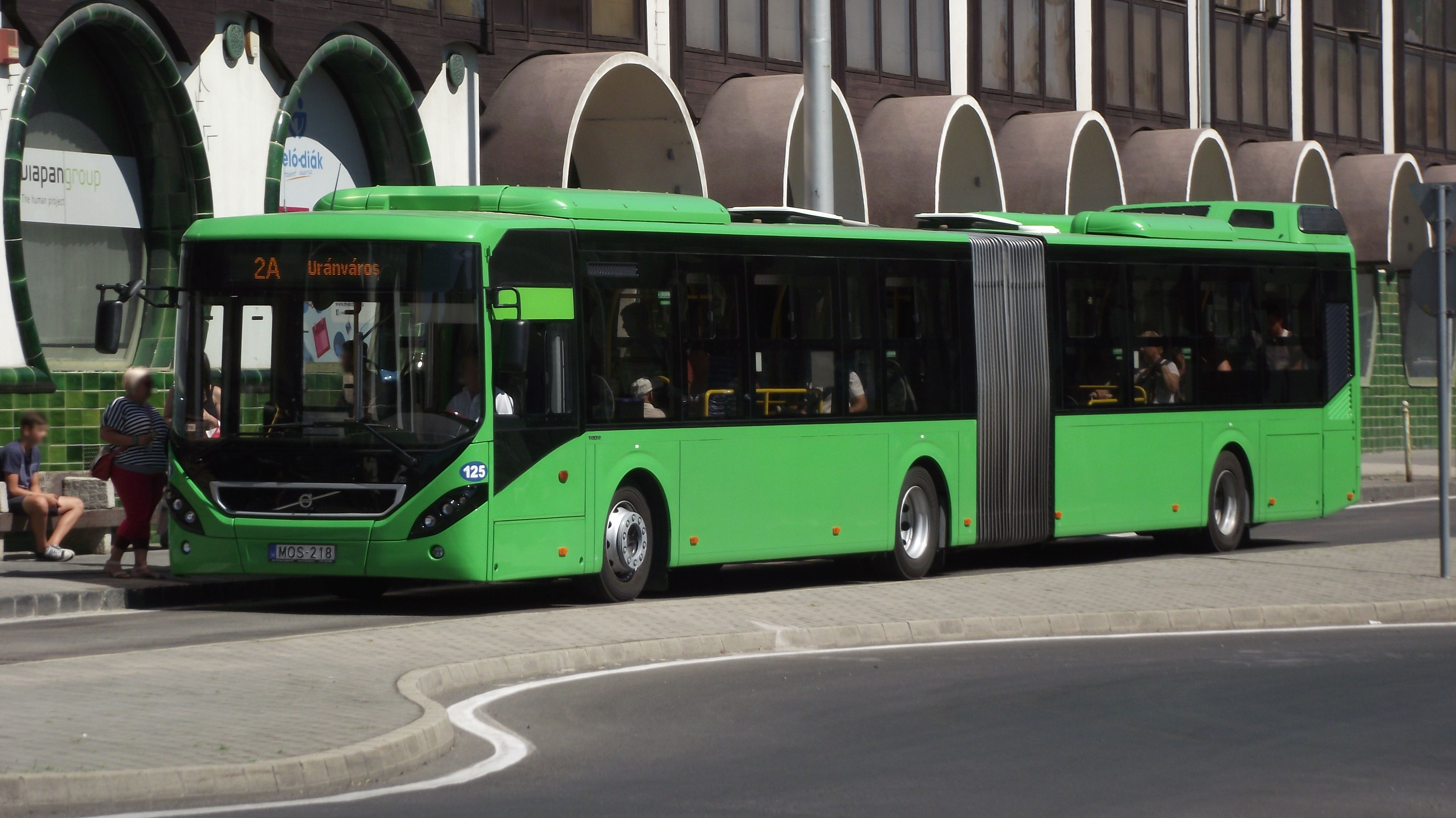
Volvo 7900A bus on Line 2A in downtown

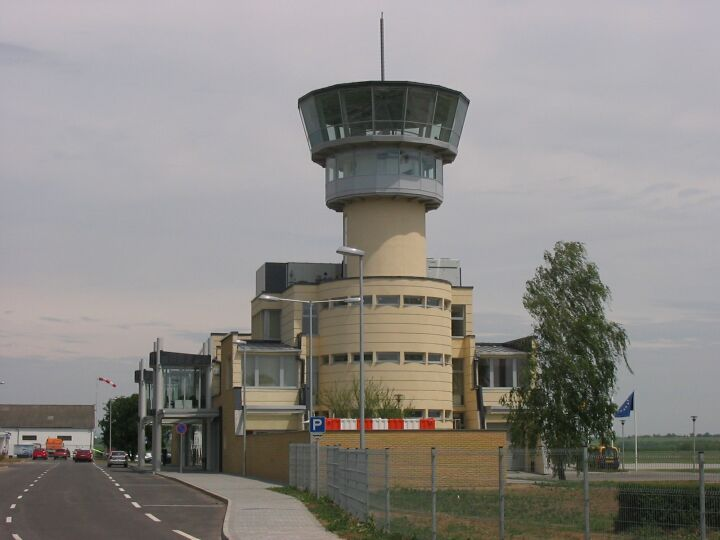
International airport

=== Roads ===
- The M6/M60 motorway connects Pécs and Budapest with the driving time between the two cities taking about 2 hours now. The entire route opened on 31 March 2010. Route 6 crosses the city giving it an east–west axle and leaves it towards Barcs by the Croatian border. Secondary routes are:
- Route 57: Pécs - Mohács,
- Route 58: Pécs - Drávaszabolcs,
- Route 66: Pécs - Kaposvár.

=== Railway ===
Pécs is connected to Budapest through Pusztaszabolcs, and has direct connections to Mohács, Nagykanizsa.

Designed by Ferenc Pfaff, the main railway station was built in 1900 and became a listed building in 2008. The building itself was built in the style of Renaissance Eclecticism, and it features reliefs depicting James Watt and George Stephenson designed by Ármin Klein and made by the Zsolnay factory. A mass transit hub -including a bus terminal, a bus stop and a cab rank zone- is situated on the square in front of the railway station.

==== Tram ====
A tram formerly operated in the city from 1914 to 1960.

=== Buses ===
Buses are the primary form of public transport in the city.

=== Airport ===
A new airport opened in Pécs Pécs-Pogány International Airport in March 2006. Its main traffic is supplied by smaller charter planes.

== Sport ==
- Pécsi MFC, football club playing in the Nemzeti Bajnokság III
- Pécsi Vasutas SK, football club playing in the Baranya megye (regional) league
- Pécsi BTC, defunct association football club
- Pécs-Baranya FC, defunct association football club
- Pécsi Bányász SC, defunct association football club
- PEAC-Pécs first-class women's professional basketball team
- Pécsi VSK, men's water polo team
- Pécsi Indiánok SK, rugby club

== Notable people born in Pécs ==
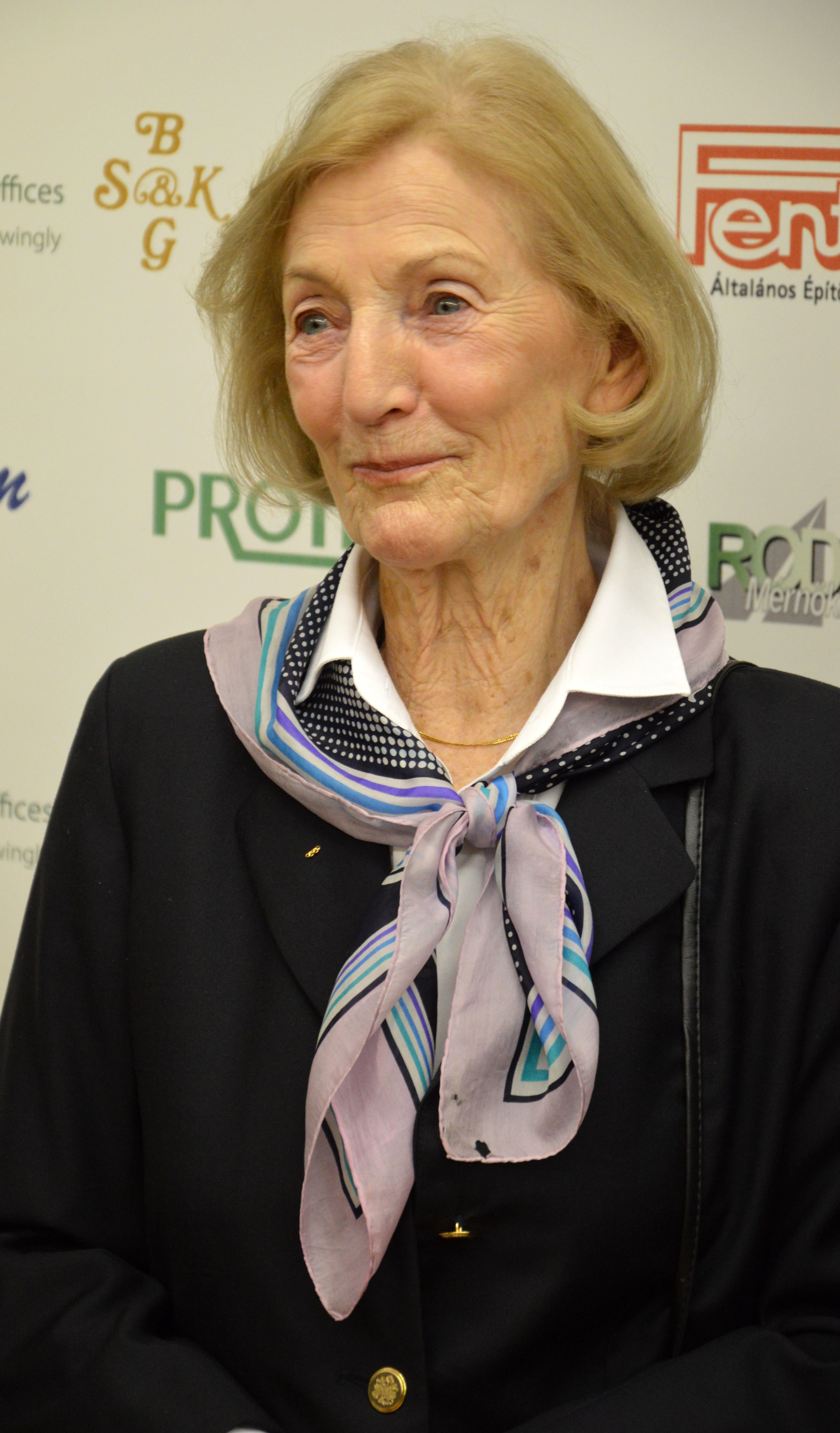
Olga Tass, Olympic gymnast

- Károly Balogh de Mankobük (1848 in Buda – 1920), president of the Royal Court in Pécs
- Marcel Breuer (1902–1981), architect and furniture designer
- Pál Dárdai (born 1976), football player
- Dénes Dibusz (born 1990), football player
- Petar Dobrović (1890–1942), Serb painter and president of the short-lived Baranya-Baja Republic
- József Eötvös (musician), guitarist
- Dezső Ernster (1898–1981), Metropolitan Opera bass
- Sigismund Ernuszt, bishop of Pécs
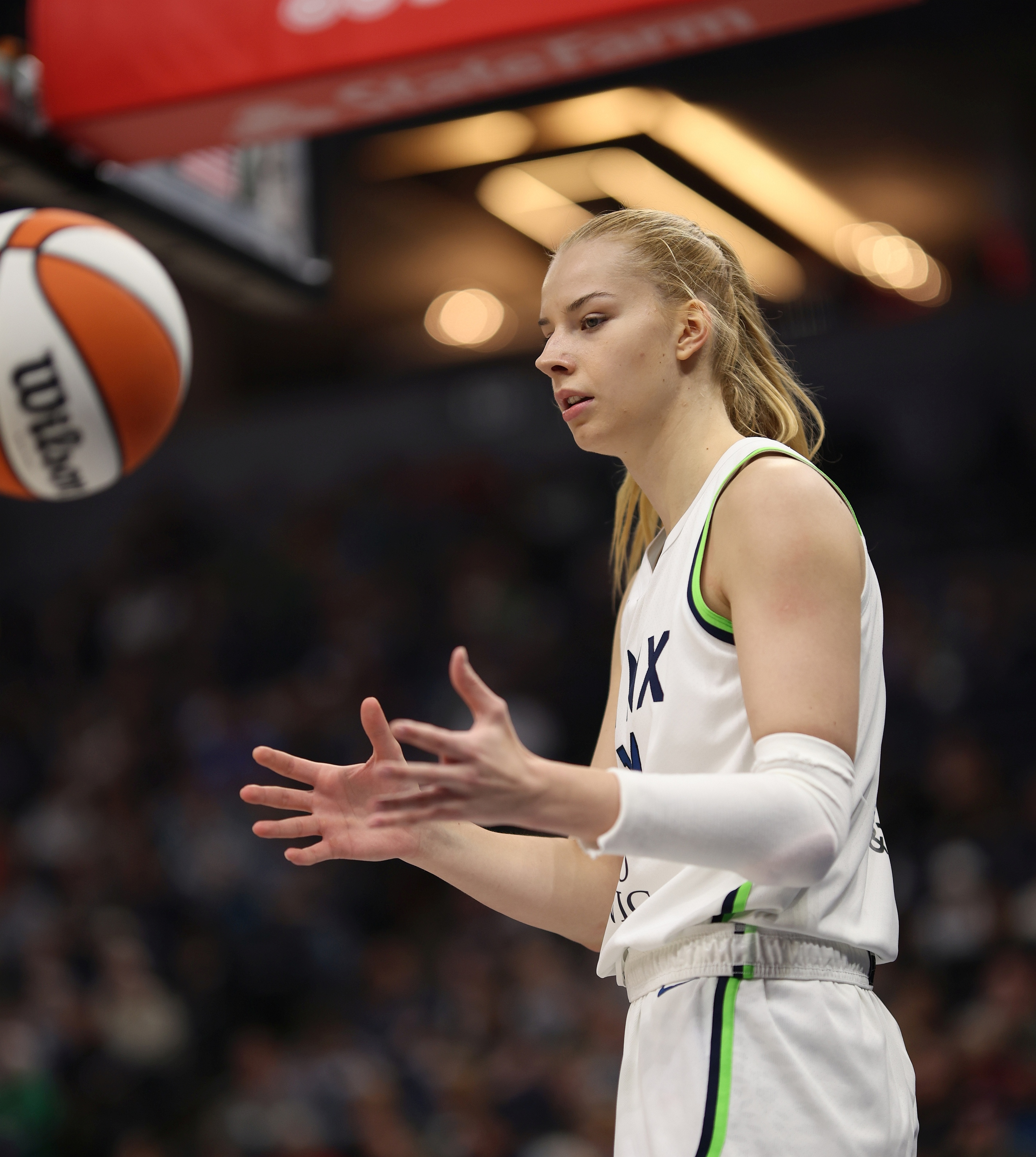
- Dorka Juhász, WNBA player
  Lipót Fejér, mathematician
- Alfréd (Fred) Forbát (1897–1972), Bauhaus architect
- Zoltán Gera (born 1979), football player
- Miklós Hasznos (1931-2014), Hungarian politician
- Martin Helstáb (born 1995), film director
- Leopold Hirschfeld (1798–1893), brewer, founder of the Pécsi Sörfőzde
- János Horvay (1874–1944), sculptor
- Katinka Hosszú (born 1989), swimmer, 3 x gold medallist at the 2016 Olympic Games
- Zsuzsanna Jakabos (born 1989), swimmer
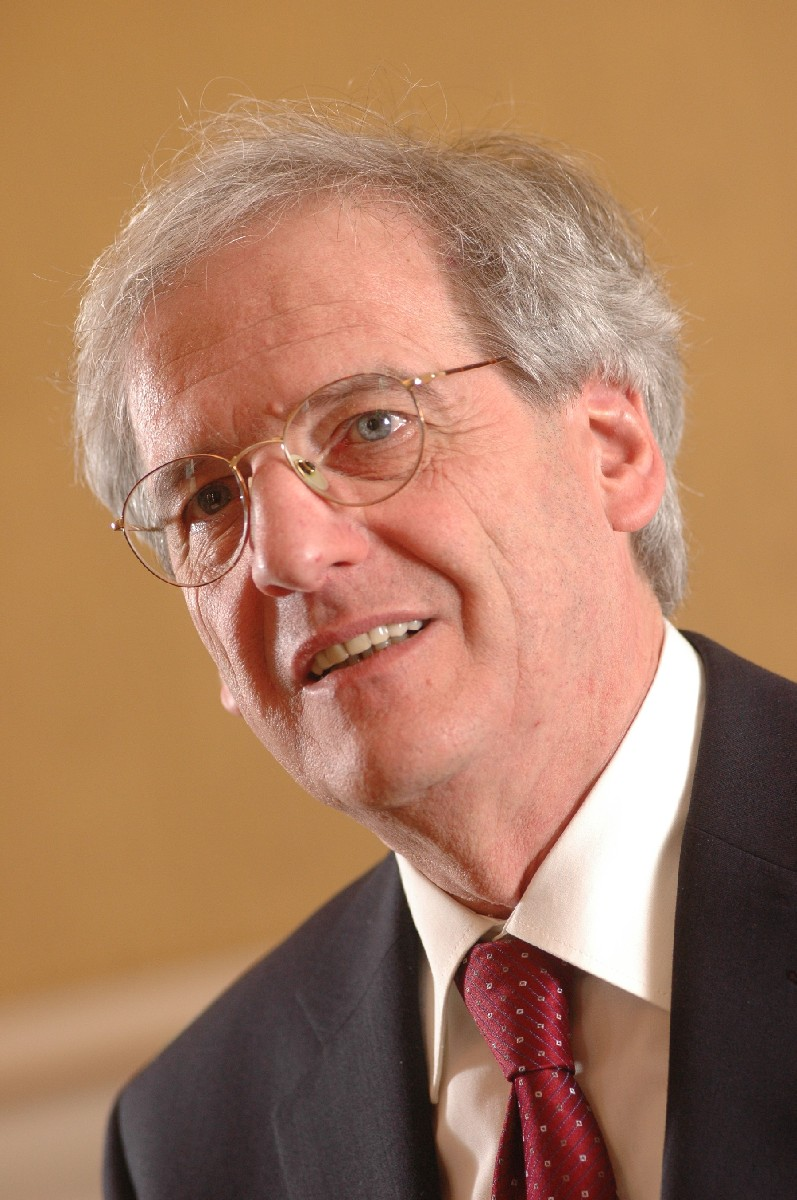
  László Sólyom, Hungarian President, 2005–2010
- Jenő Jandó (1952–2023), pianist
- Dorka Juhász (born 1999), WNBA player
- György Klimó, bishop of Pécs, founder of press and public library
- Dezső Lauber (1879–1966), sportsman and architect
- László Lénárd (born 1944), neuroscientist, physician
- Kató Lomb (1909–2003), interpreter, language master
- Maximinus (Praetorian Prefect)
- Farkas Molnár (1897–1945), architect, painter, essayist, and graphic artist
- Janus Pannonius, bishop of Pécs
- İbrahim Peçevi (Ibrahim of Pécs), Ottoman historian and chronicler
- Karl (Freiherr) von Pflanzer-Baltin
- Péter Pócs (born 1950), artist
- Damir Redzic (born 2003), football player
- Anton von Rosas, ophthalmologist
- Joe Rudán (born 1963), singer
- László Sólyom (1942–2023), president of Hungary
- Béla Tarr (1955–2026), film director
- Olga Tass (1929–2020), Olympic gymnast
- Victor Vasarely (1906–1997), artist
- Balázs Zamostny (born in 1992), Hungarian footballer
- Teréz Zsolnay, applied artist, writer
- Vilmos Zsolnay (1828–1900, industrialist, entrepreneur, applied artist, writer

== Twin towns – sister cities ==
Pécs is twinned with:

- Arad, Romania
- Beyoğlu, Turkey
- Cluj-Napoca, Romania
- Fellbach, Germany
- Graz, Austria
- Kraków, Poland
- Kütahya, Turkey
- Lahti, Finland
- Novi Sad, Serbia
- Olomouc, Czech Republic
- Osijek, Croatia
- Seattle, United States
- Shiraz, Iran
- Shkodër, Albania
- Sliven, Bulgaria
- Terracina, Italy
- Tucson, United States
- Tuzla, Bosnia and Herzegovina
- Zagreb, Croatia

The city also has an informal friendship link with Peterborough, England.

== Gallery ==
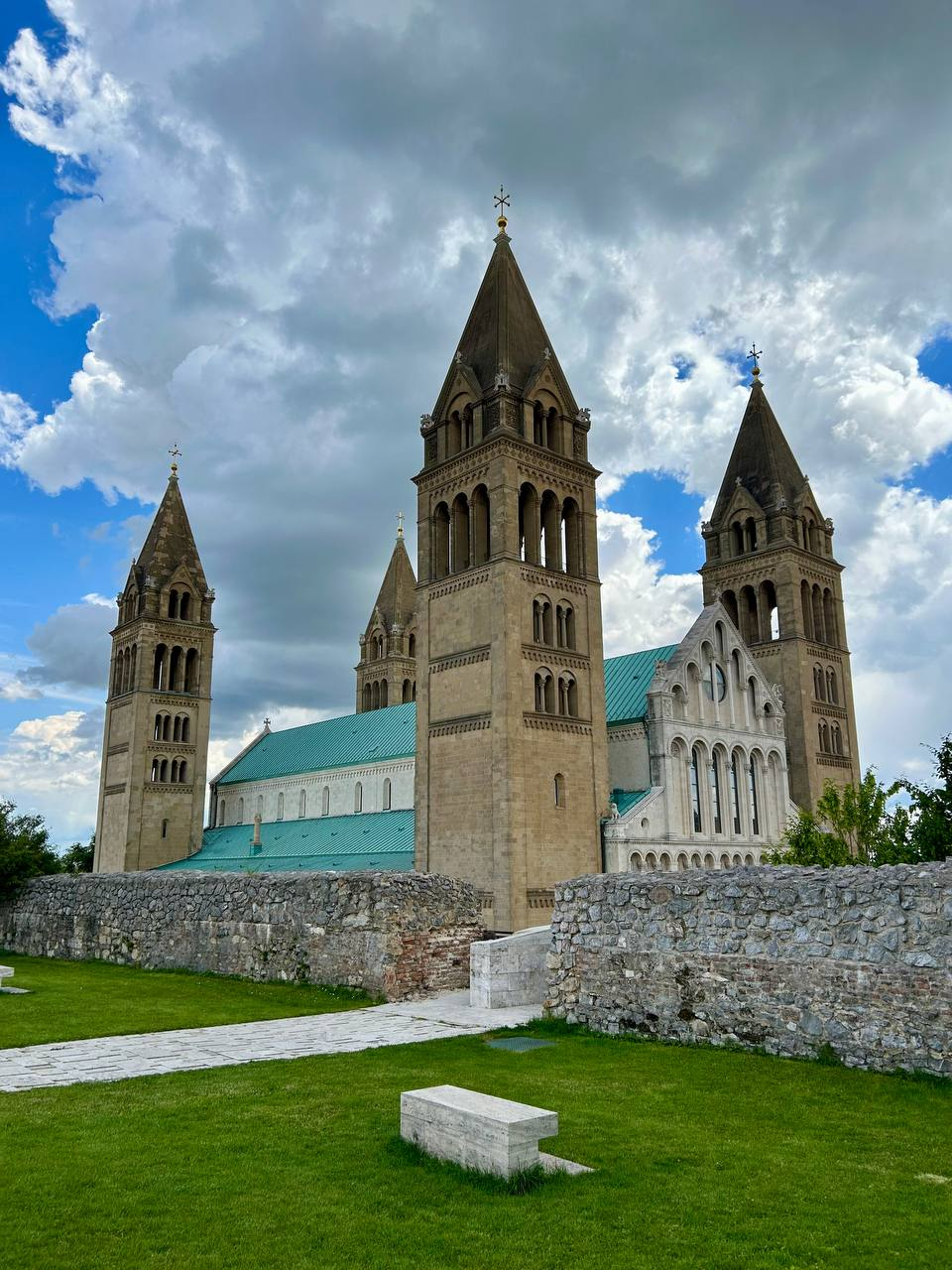
Cathedral

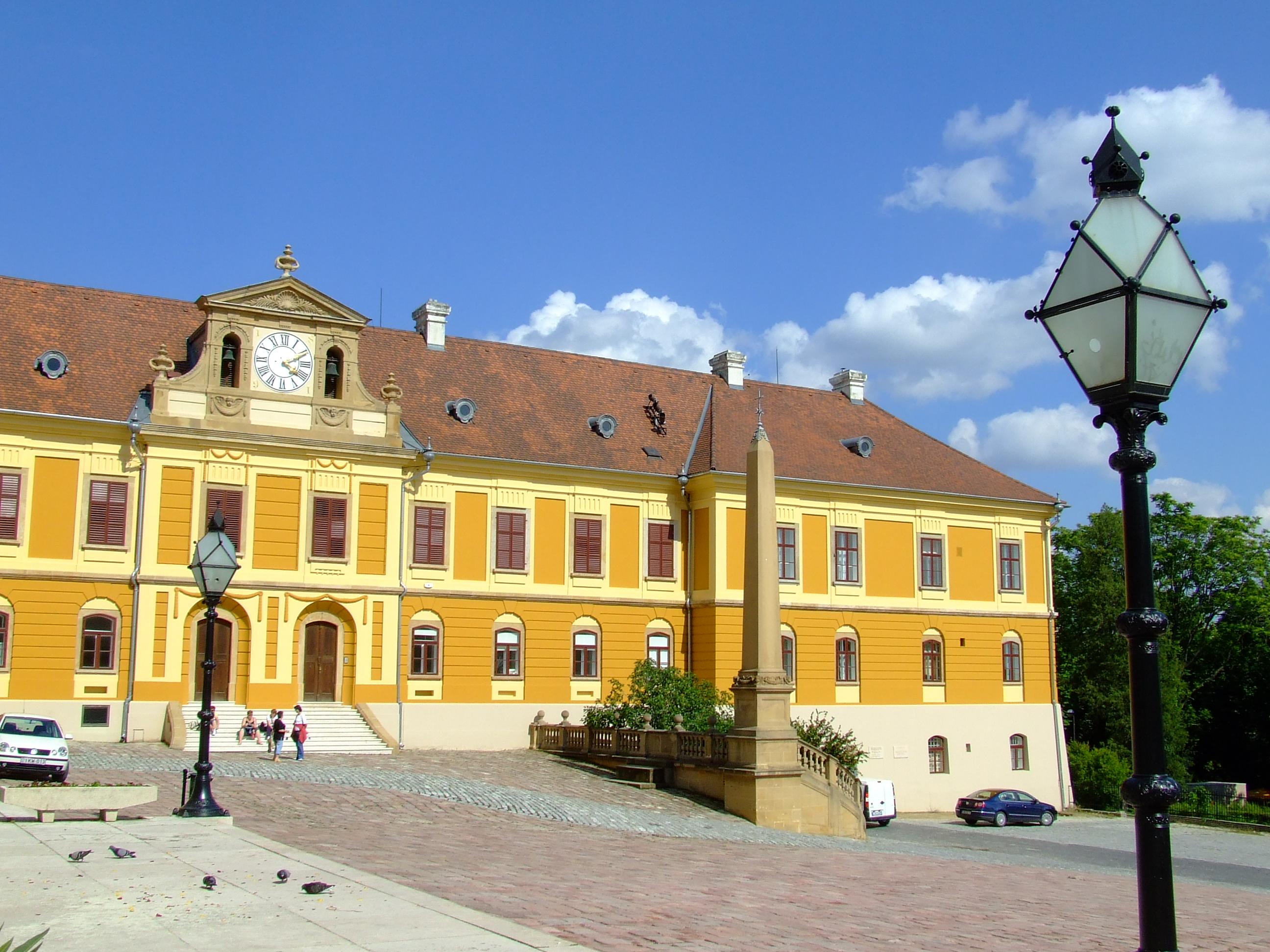
Archives of Pécs

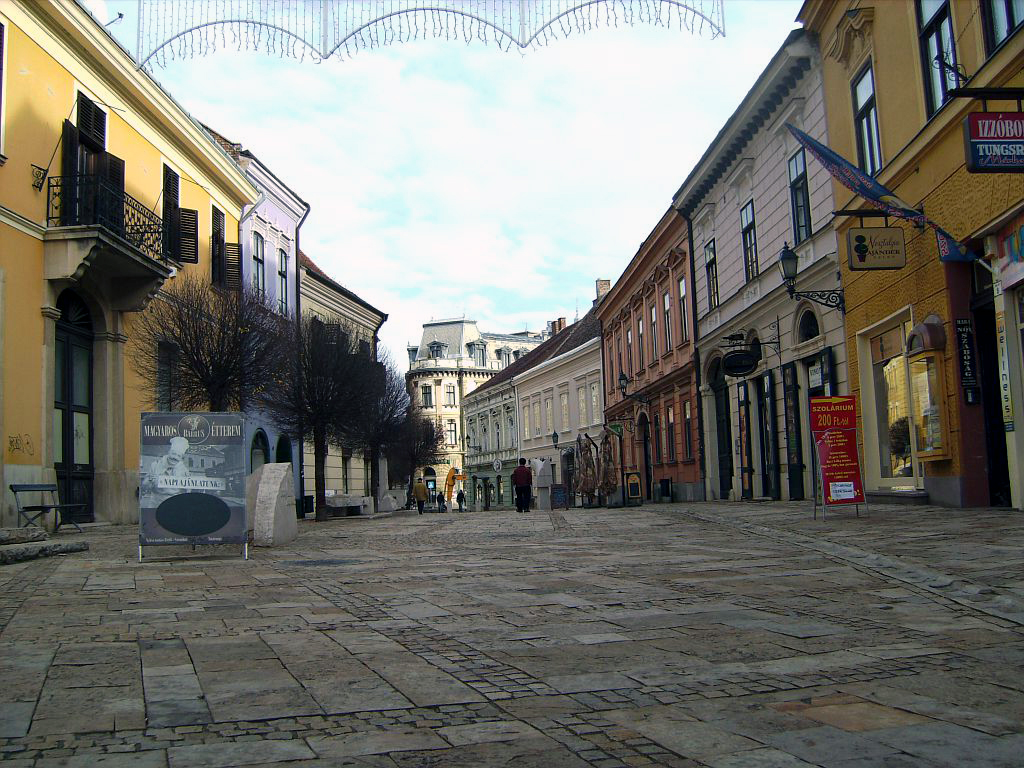
Inner city

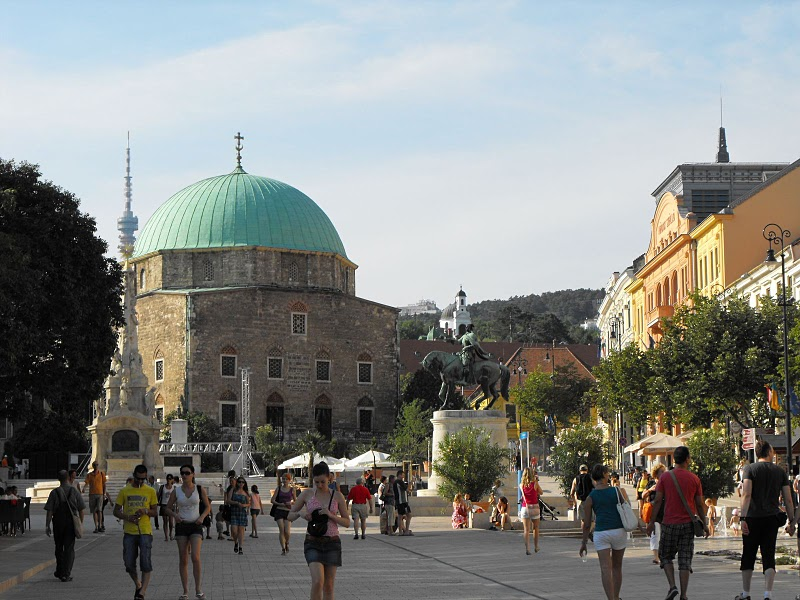
Mosque of Pasha Qasim

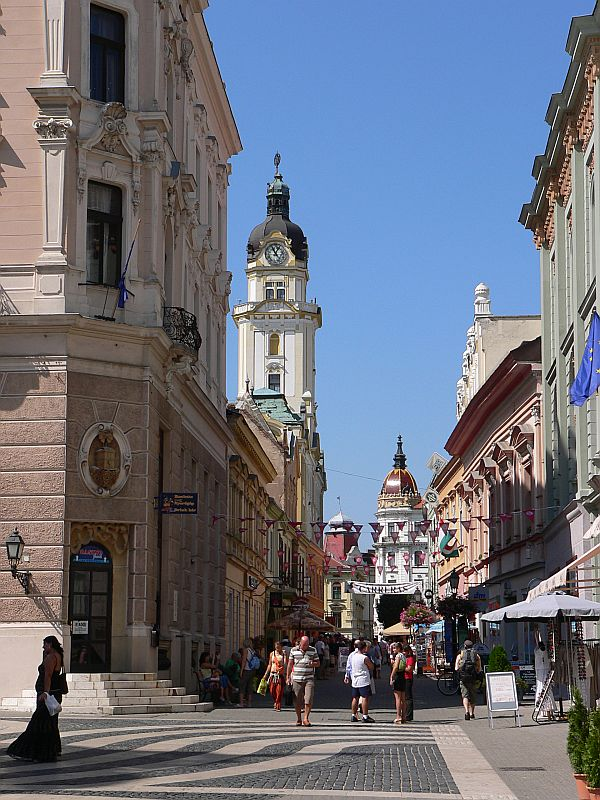
Király Street

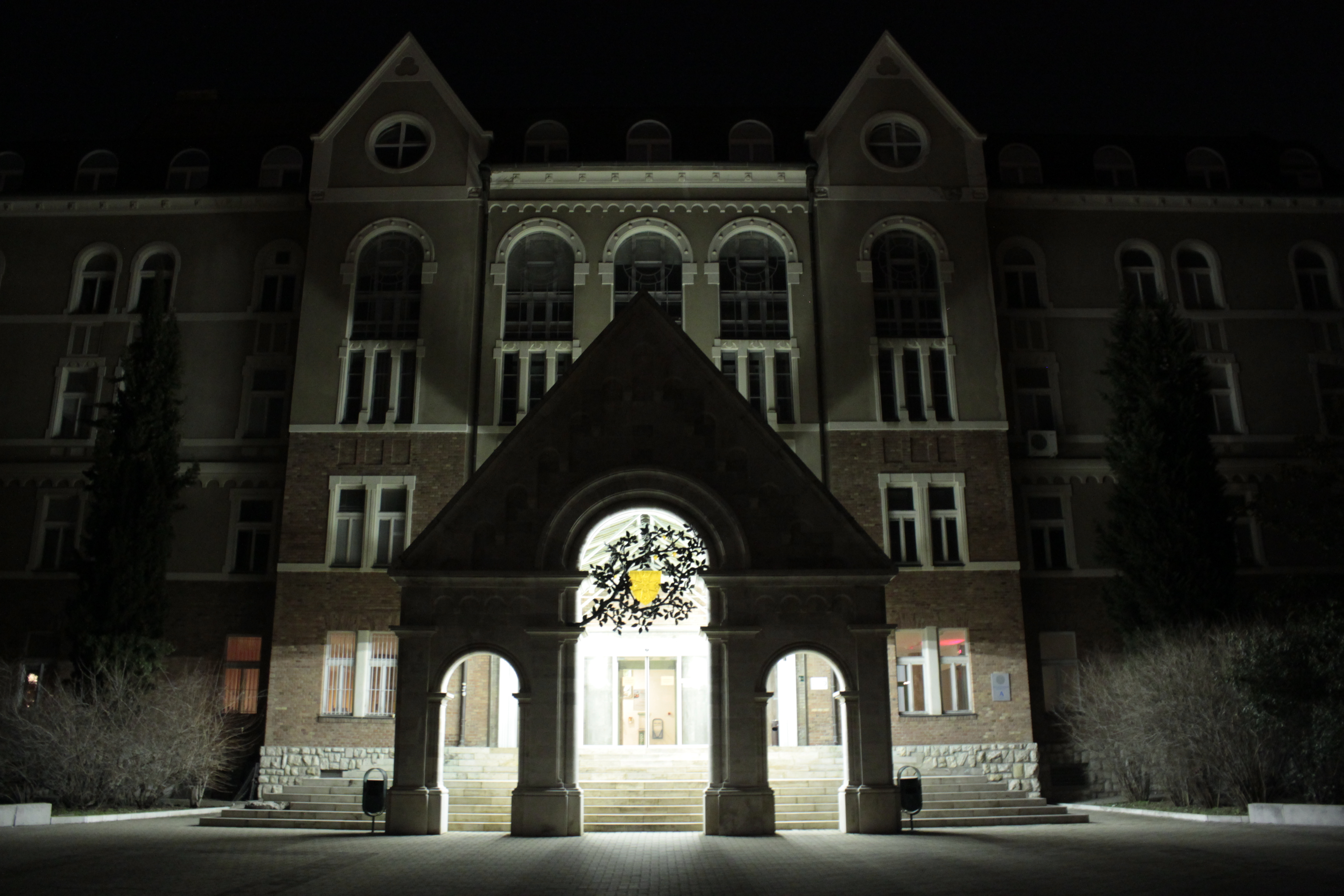
University of Pécs

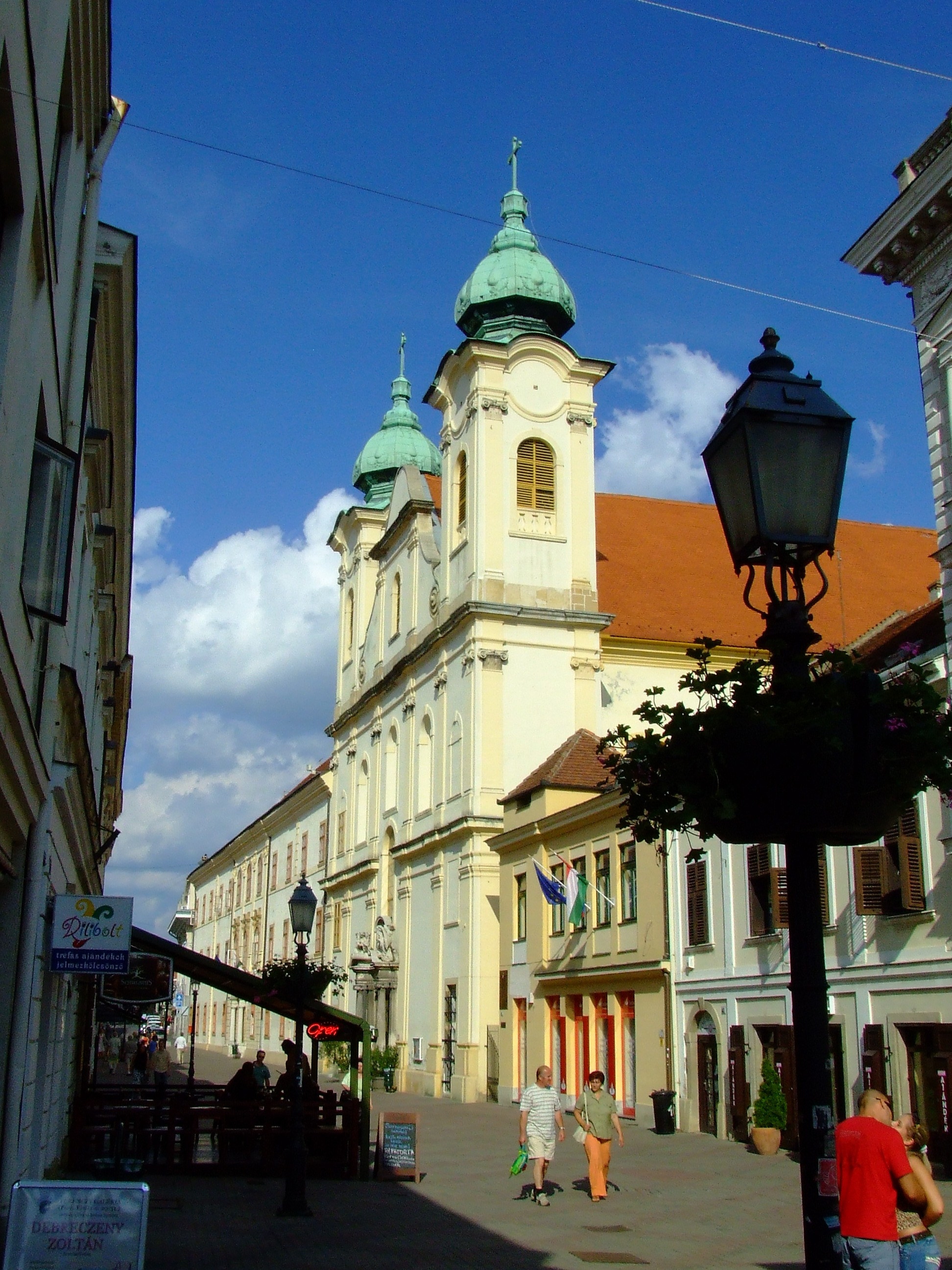
Király Street

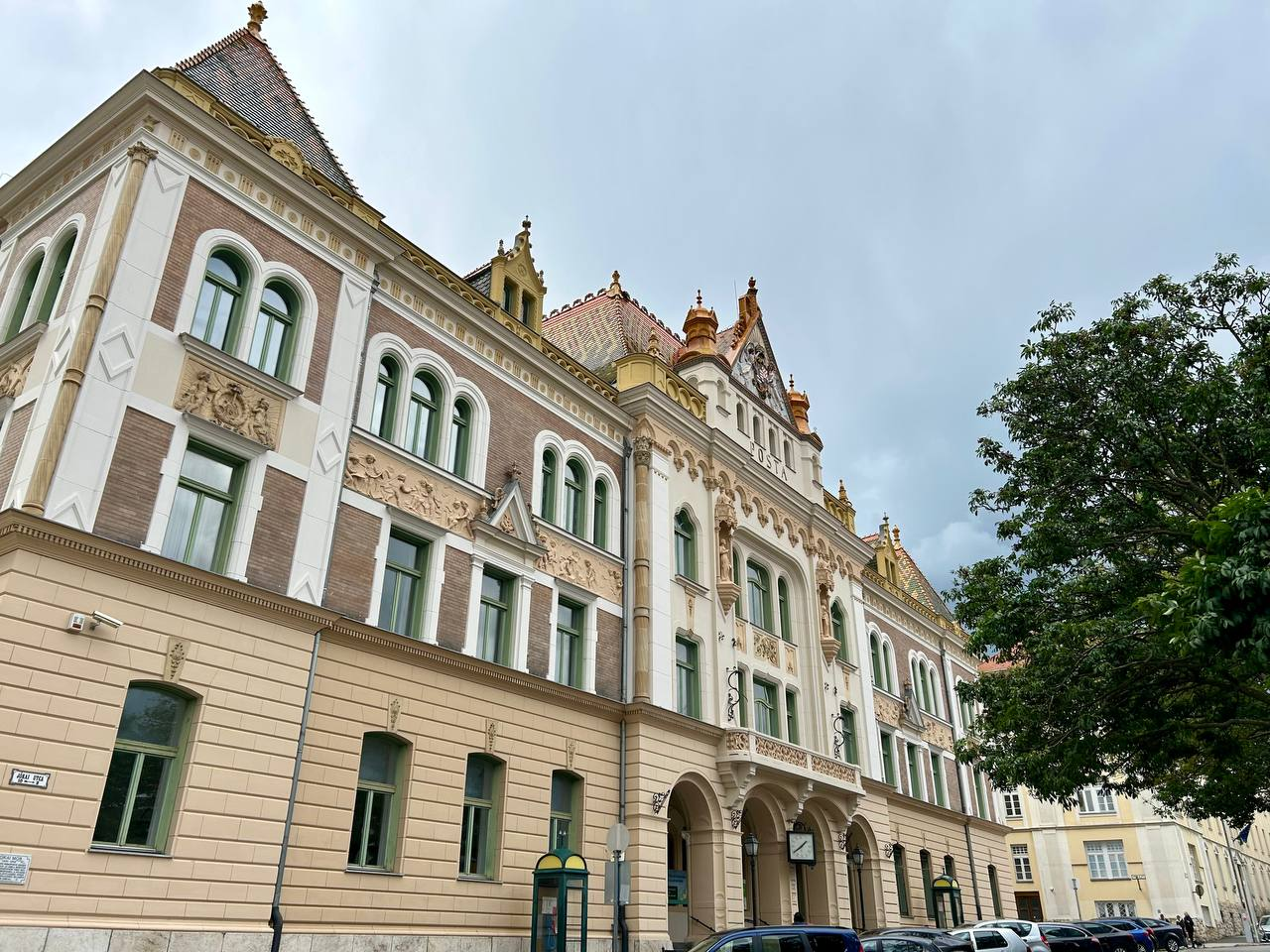
Posta Palace

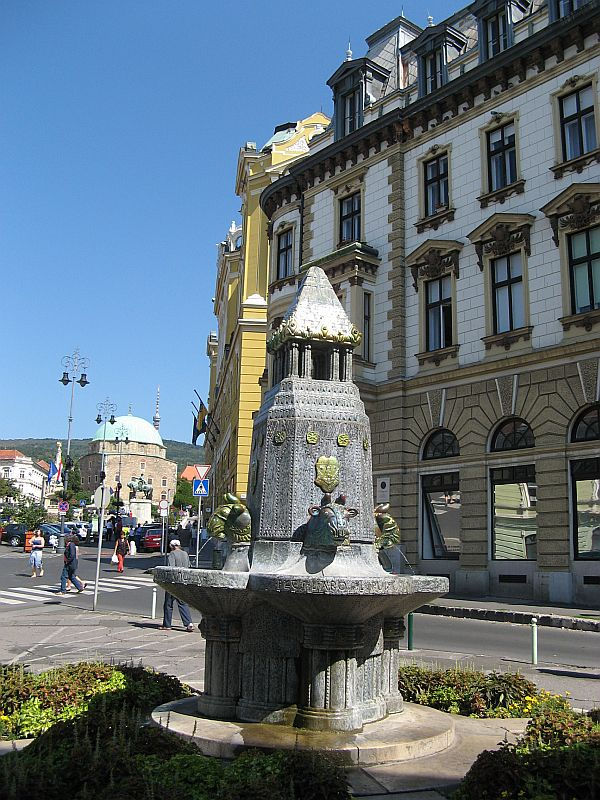
Eosin glaze of Zsolnay fountain

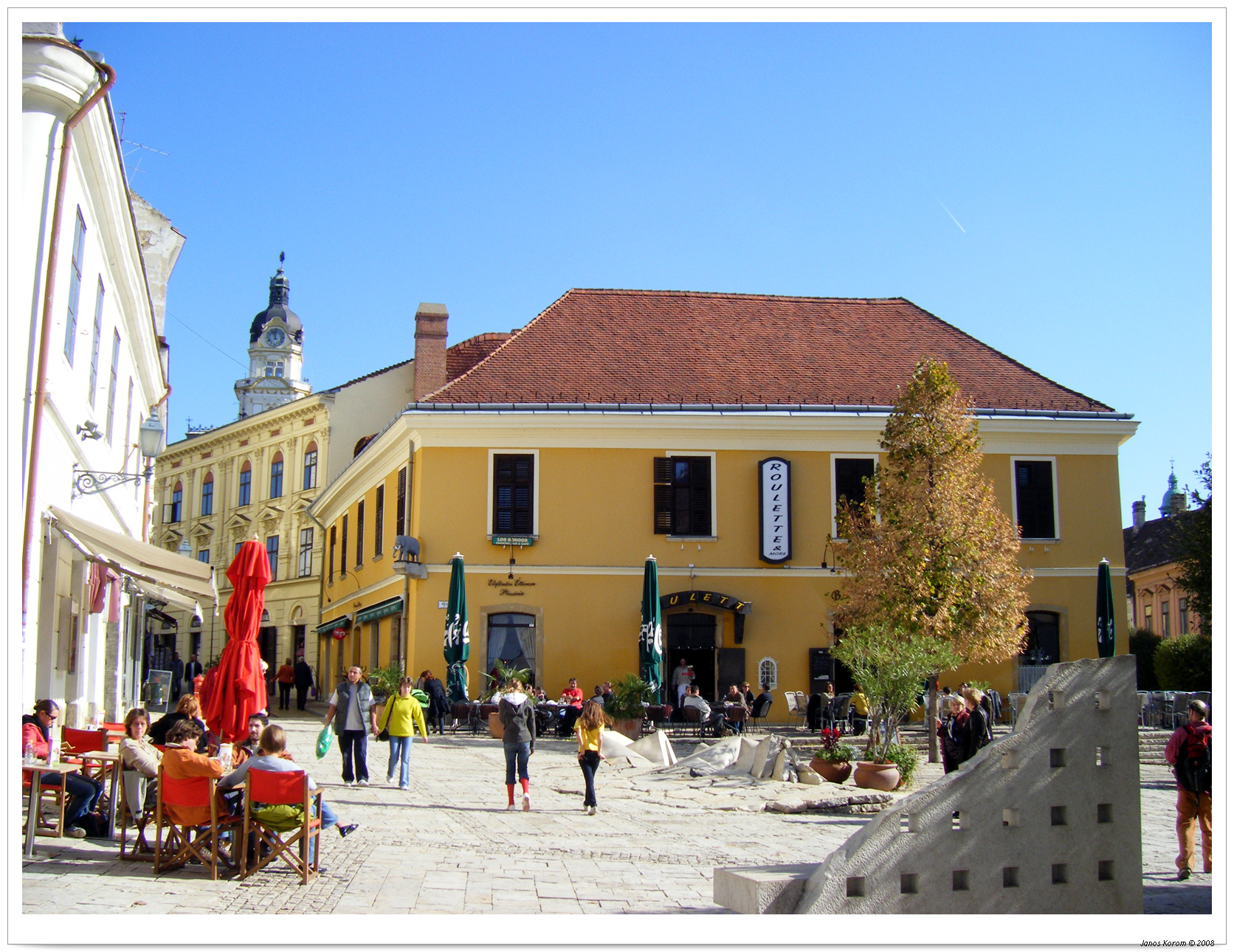
Jókai Square

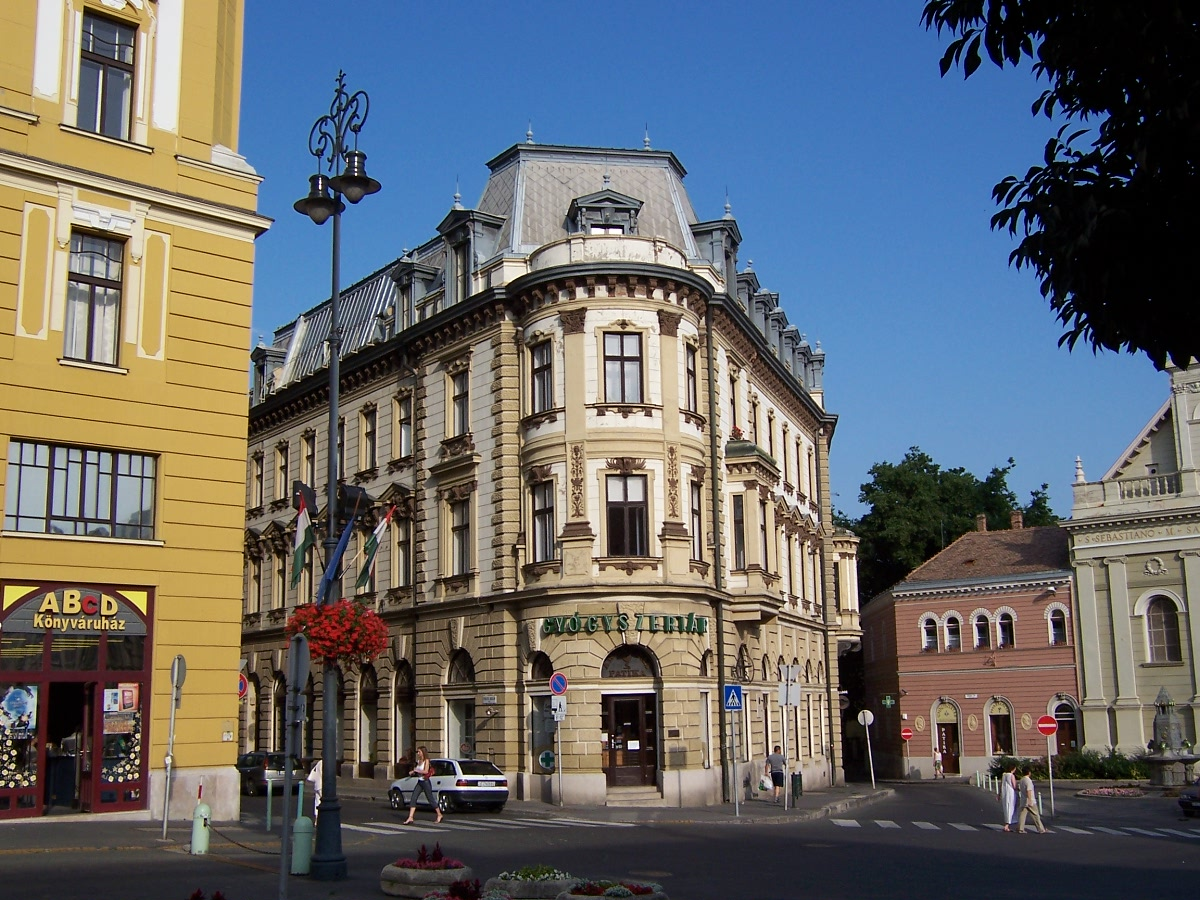
City Centre

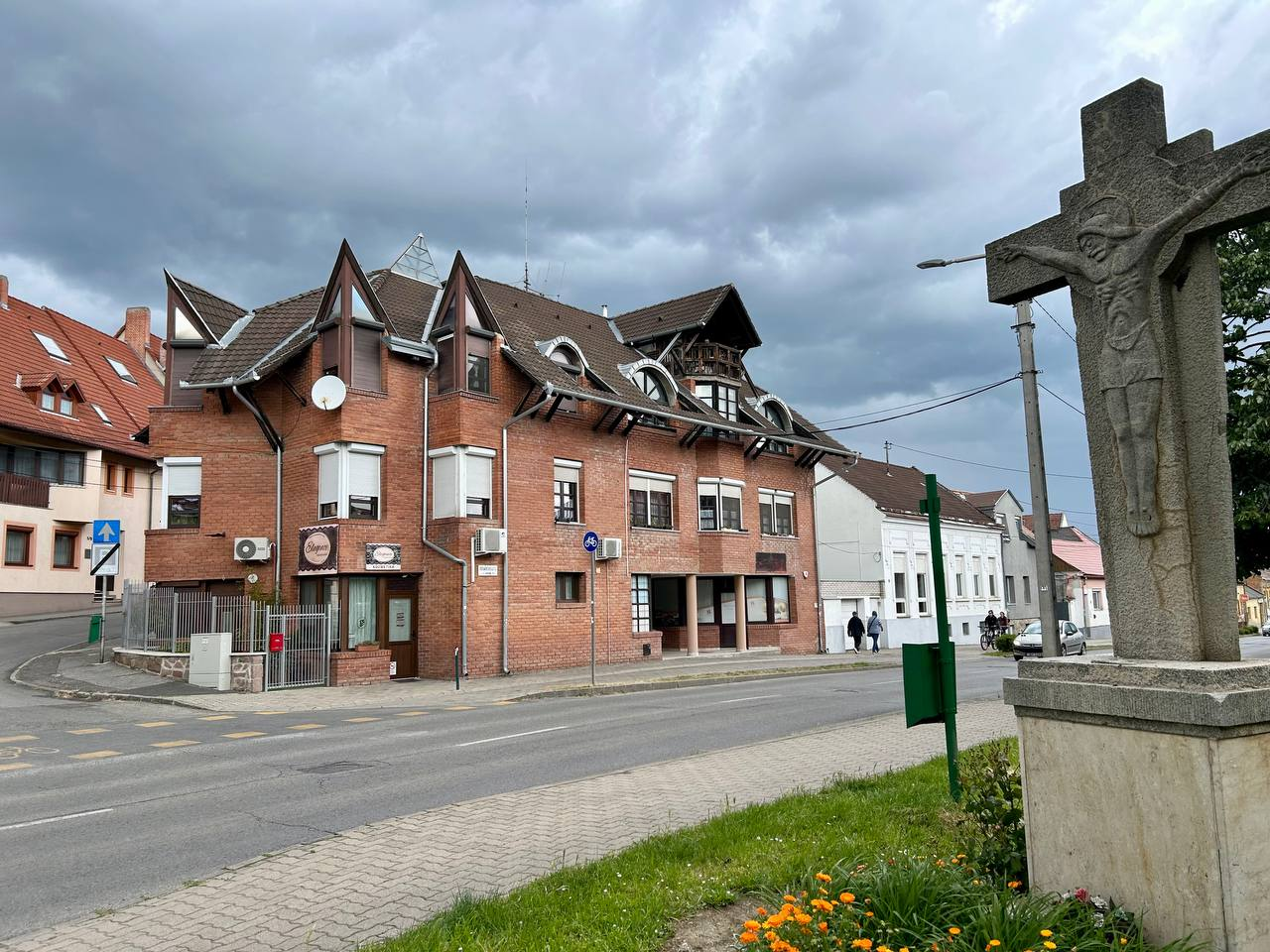
Houses in the city

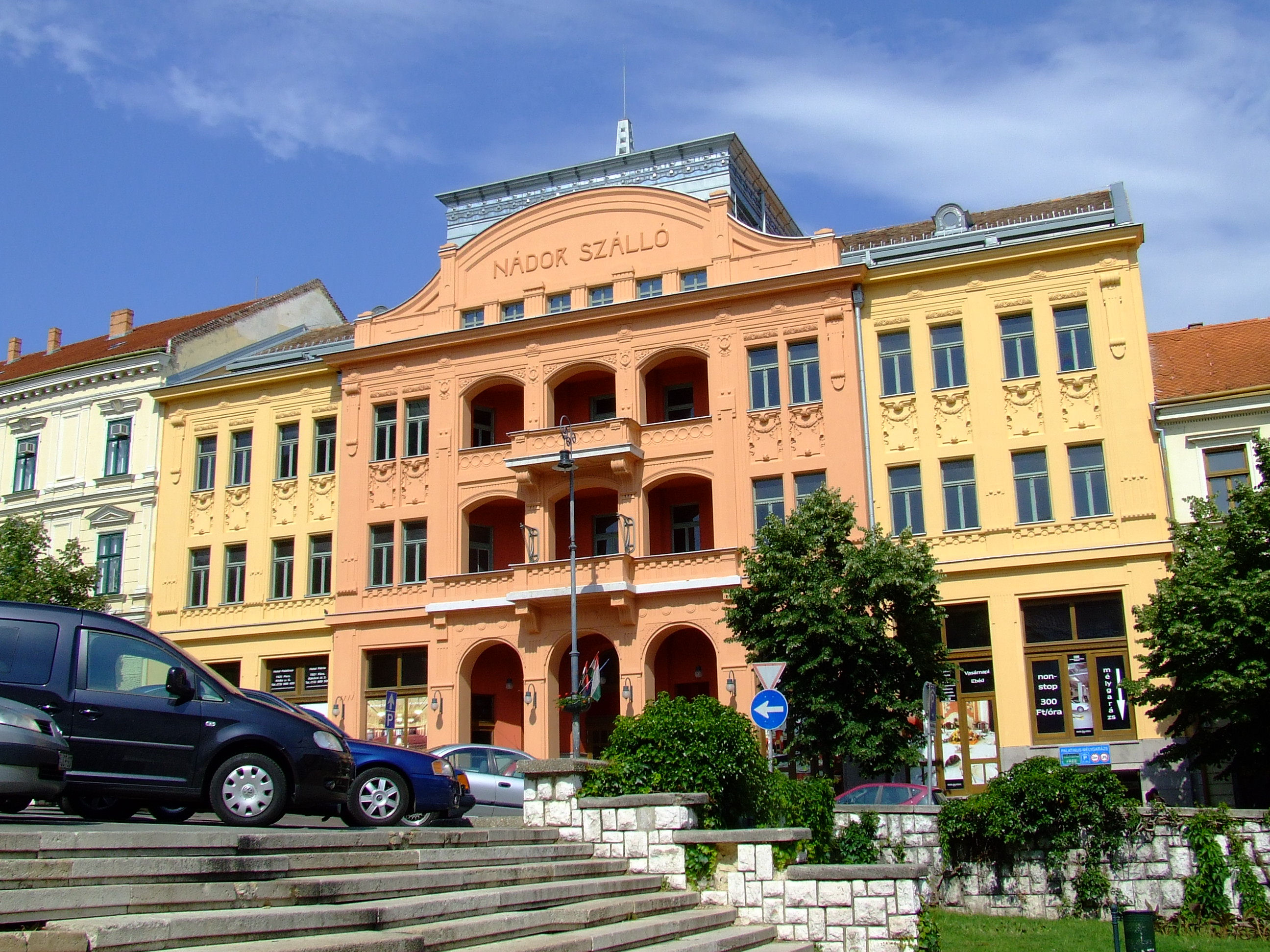
Nádor Hotel

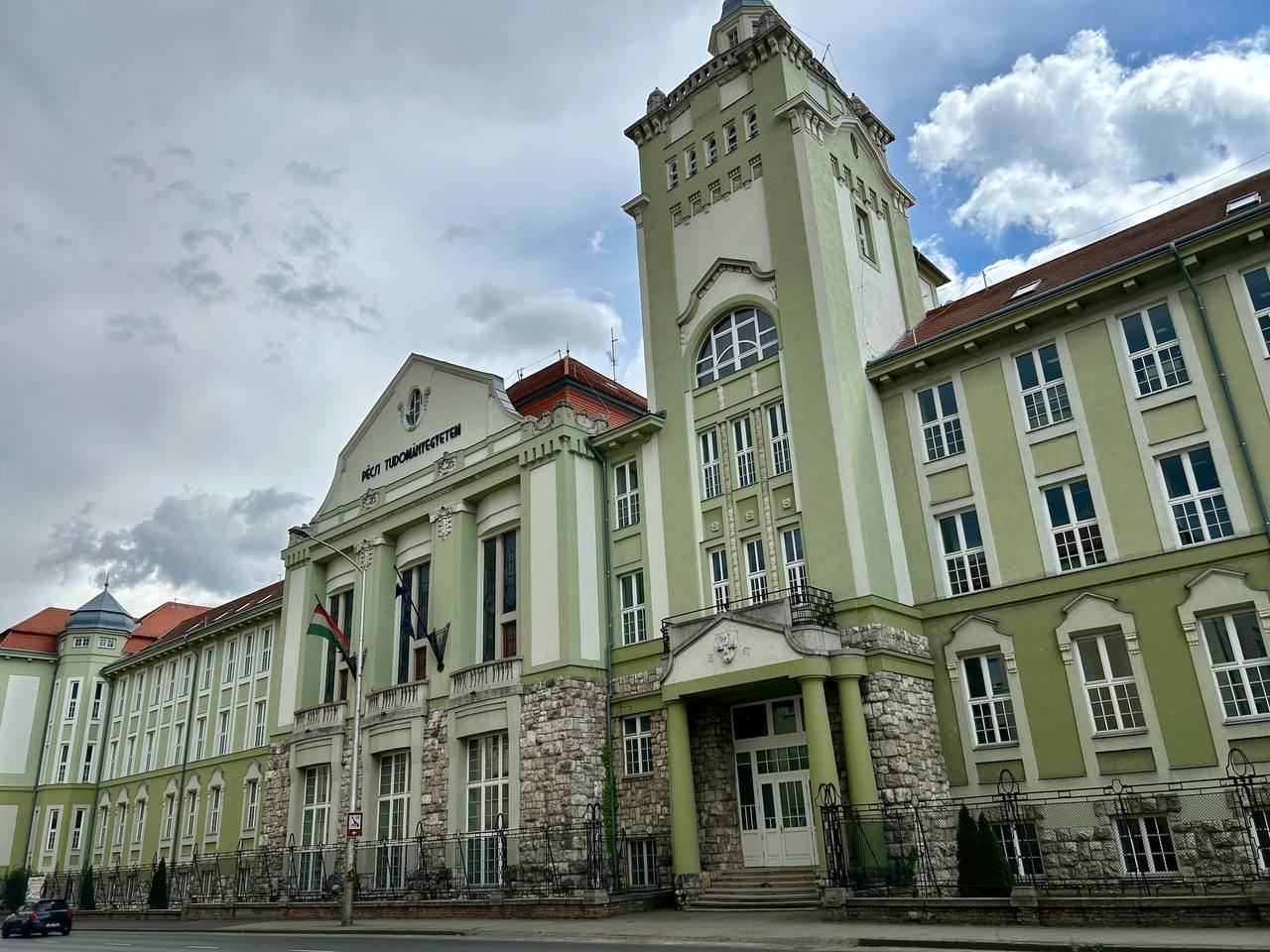

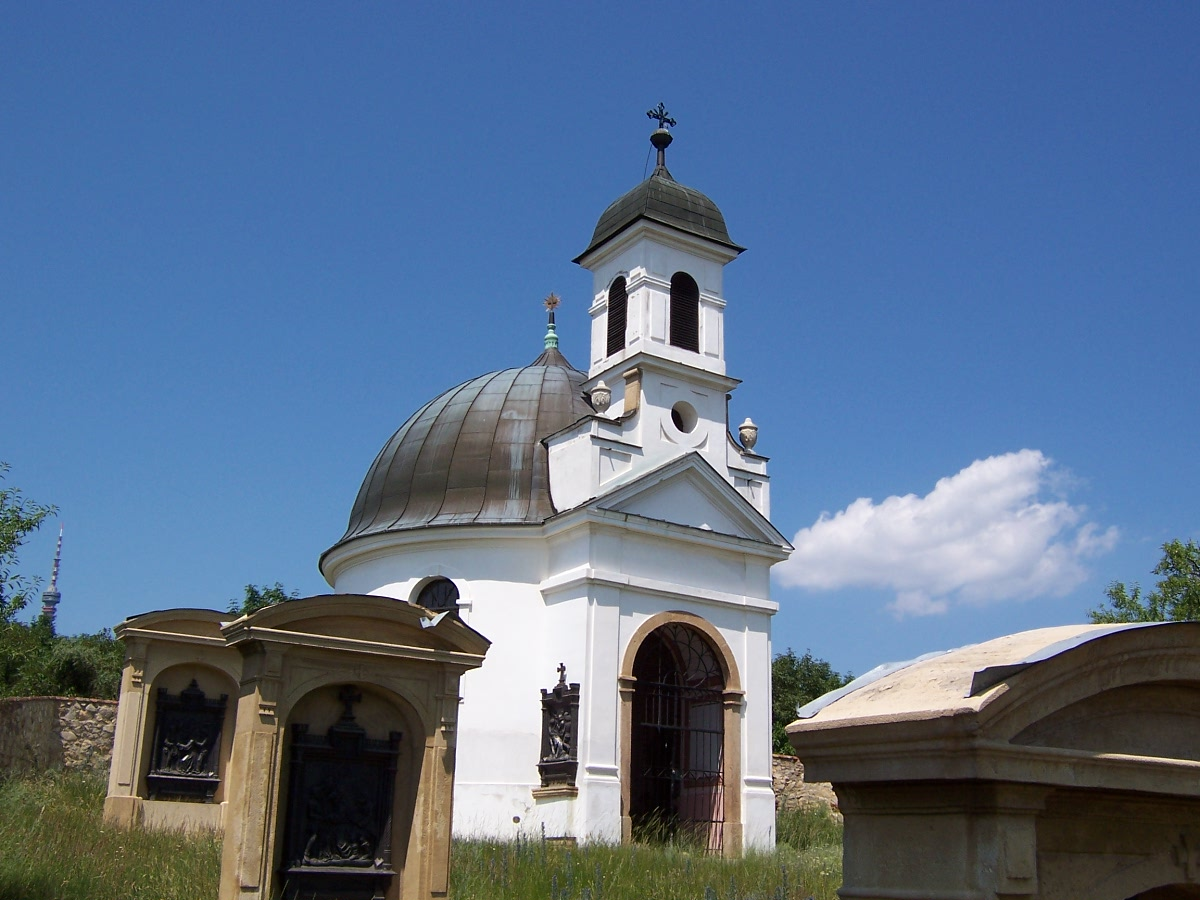
Chapel

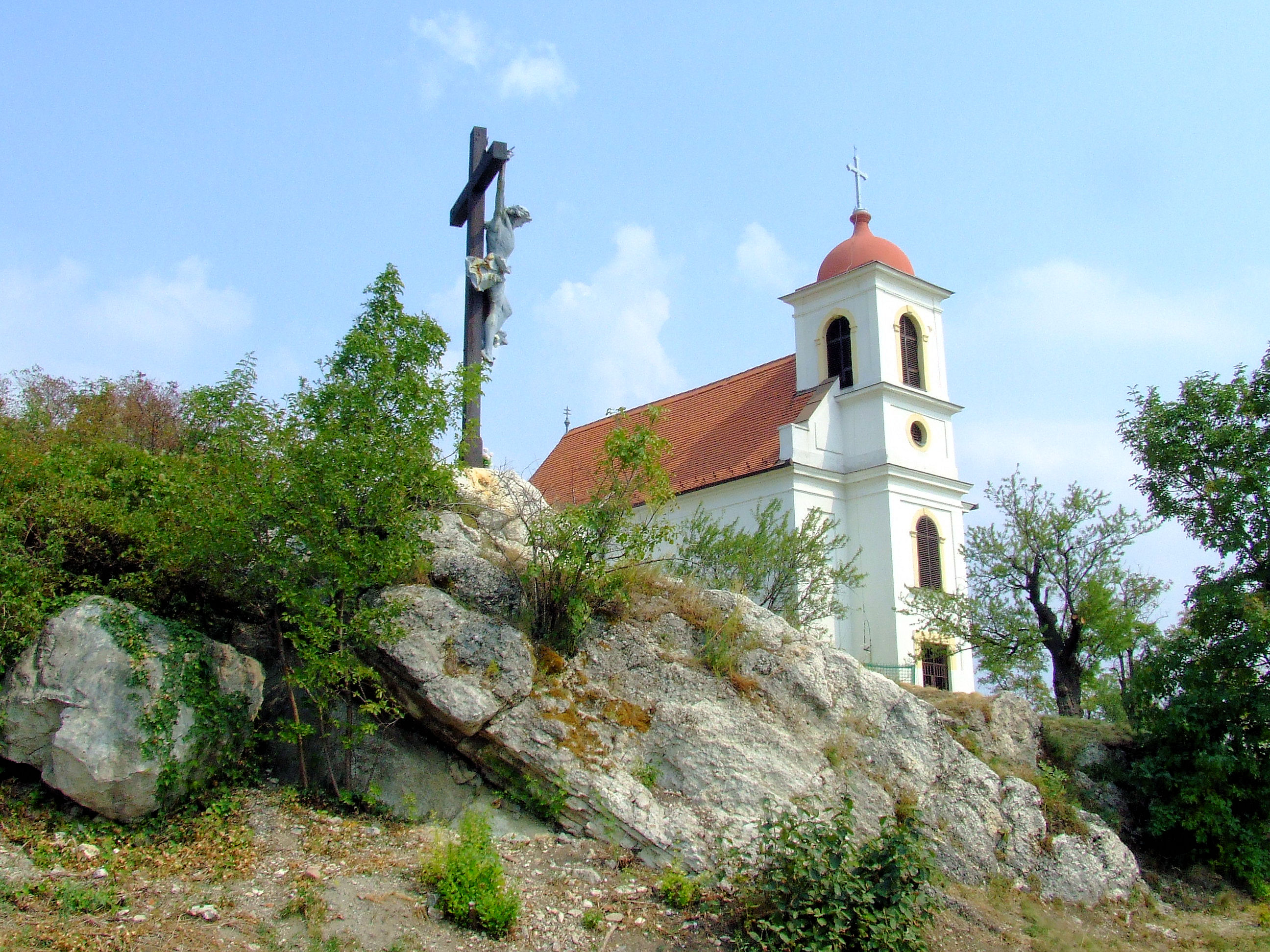
Havihegy Chapel

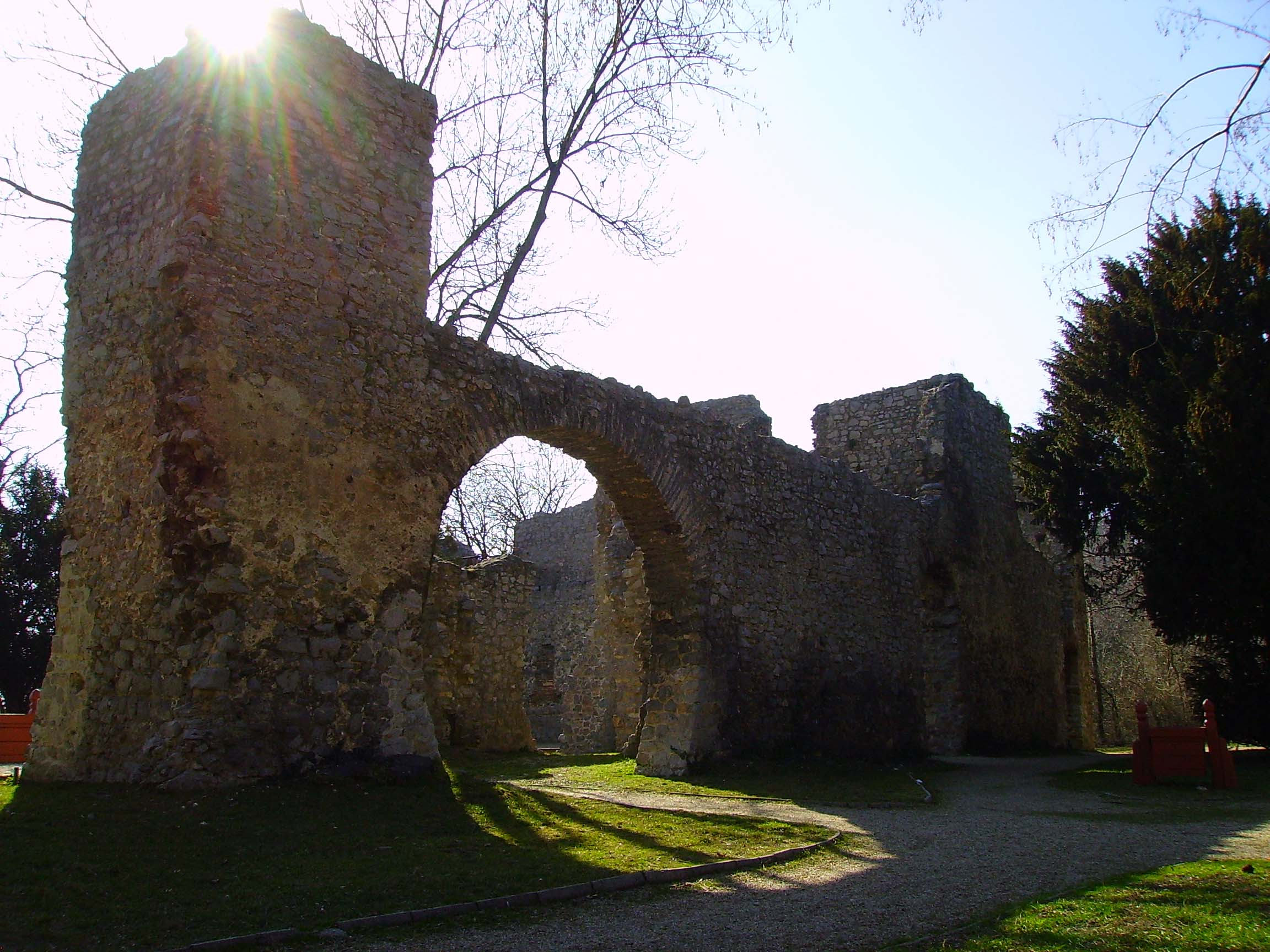
Ruins in Tettye

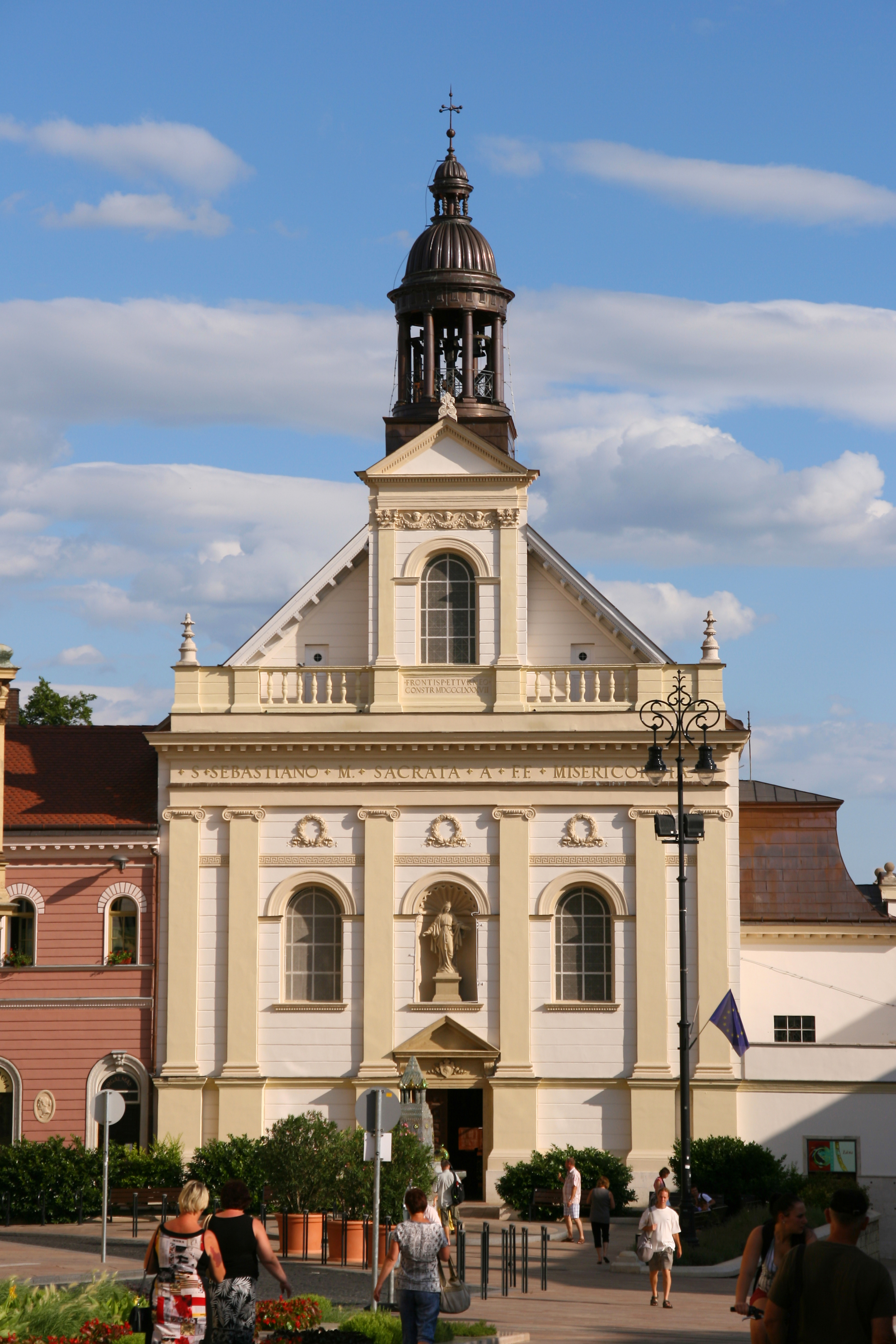
St Sebastian Church

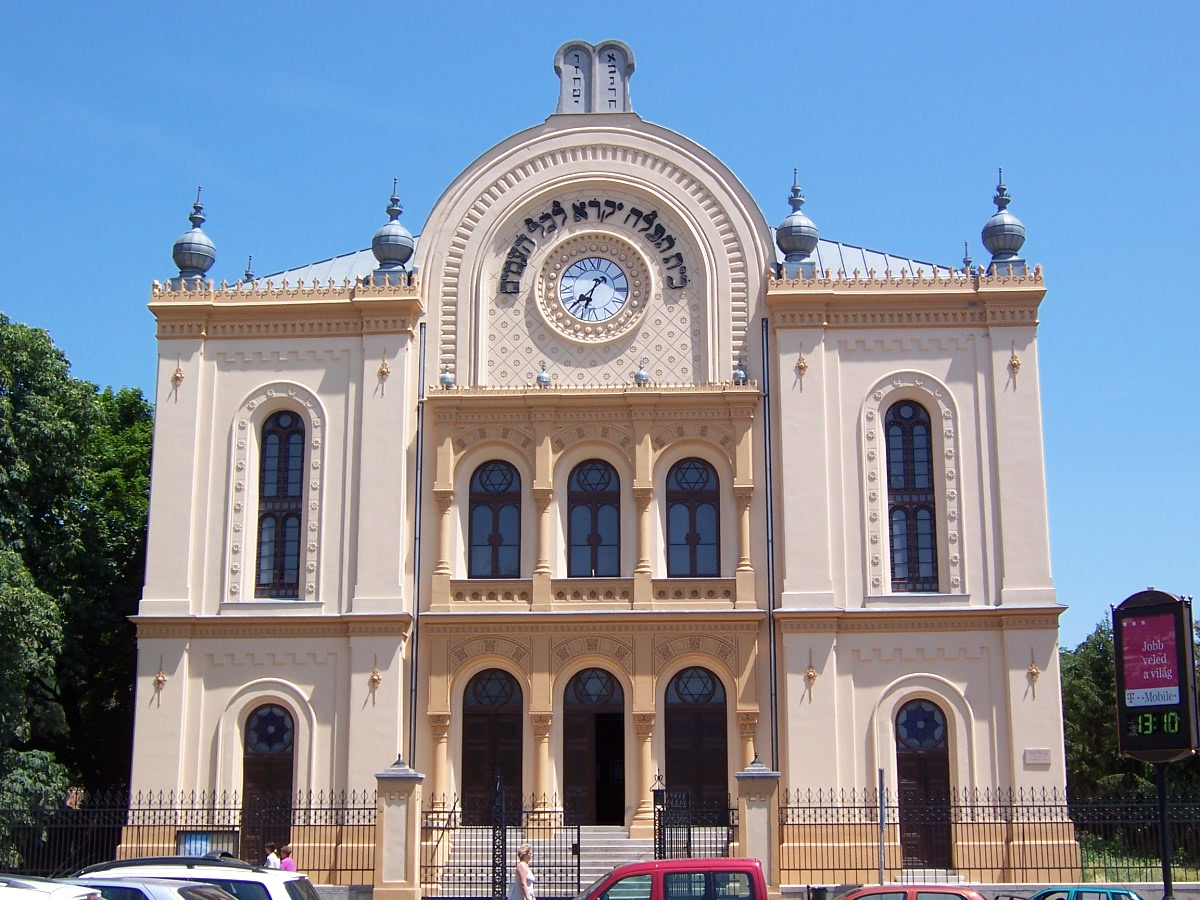
Synagogue

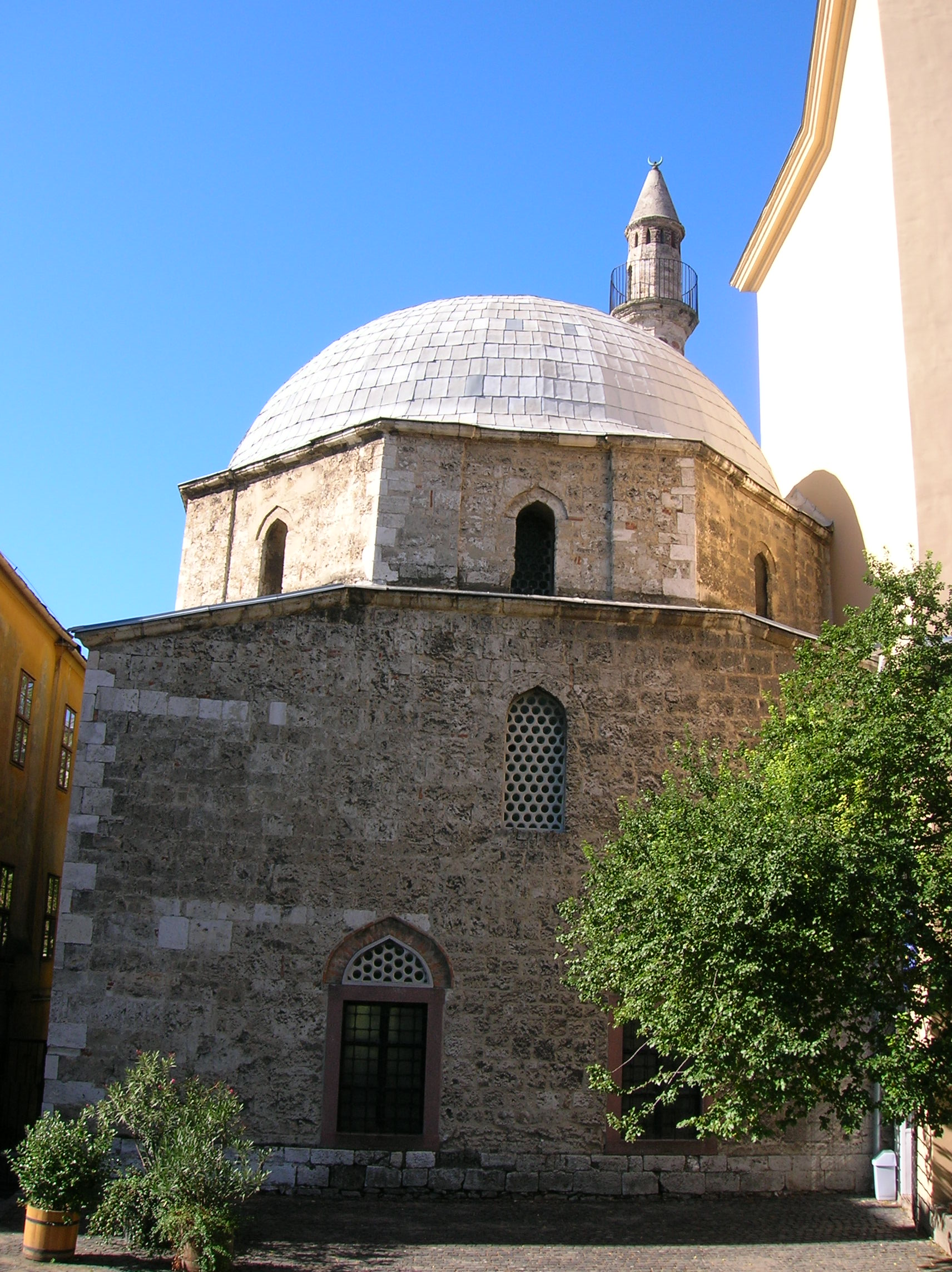
Yakovalı Hasan Paşa Mosque

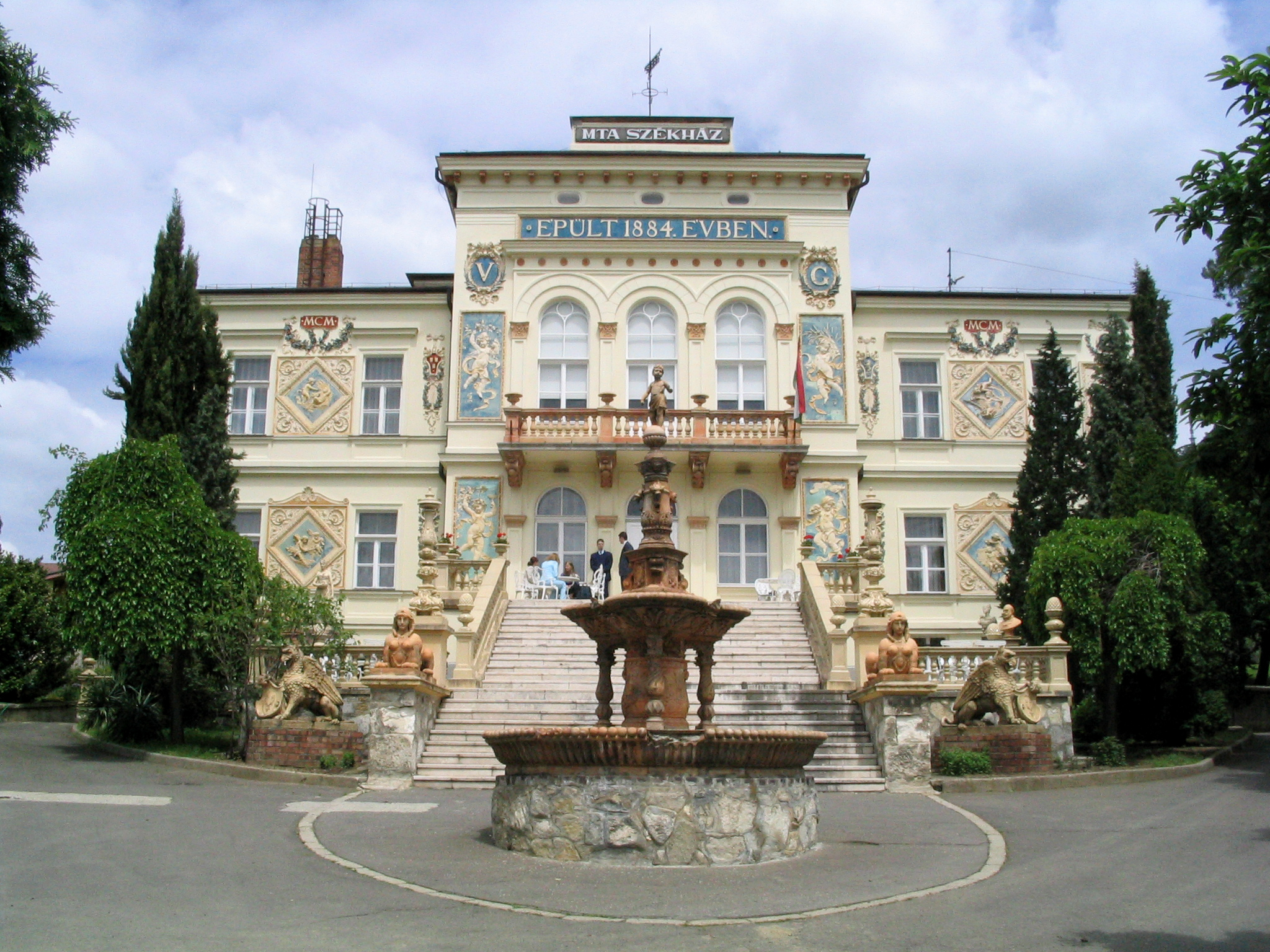
Hungarian Academy of Sciences in Pécs

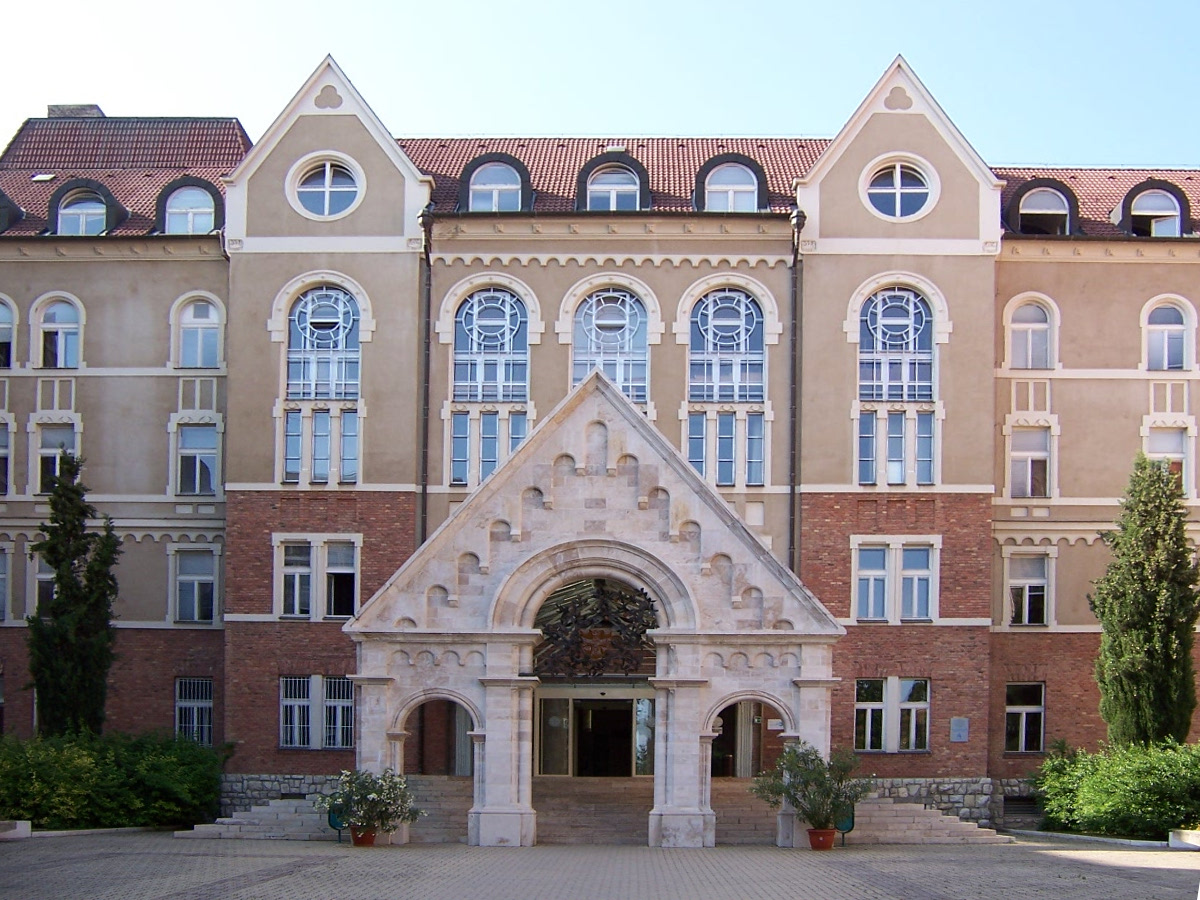
University of Pécs - Faculty of Humanity and Natural Sciences

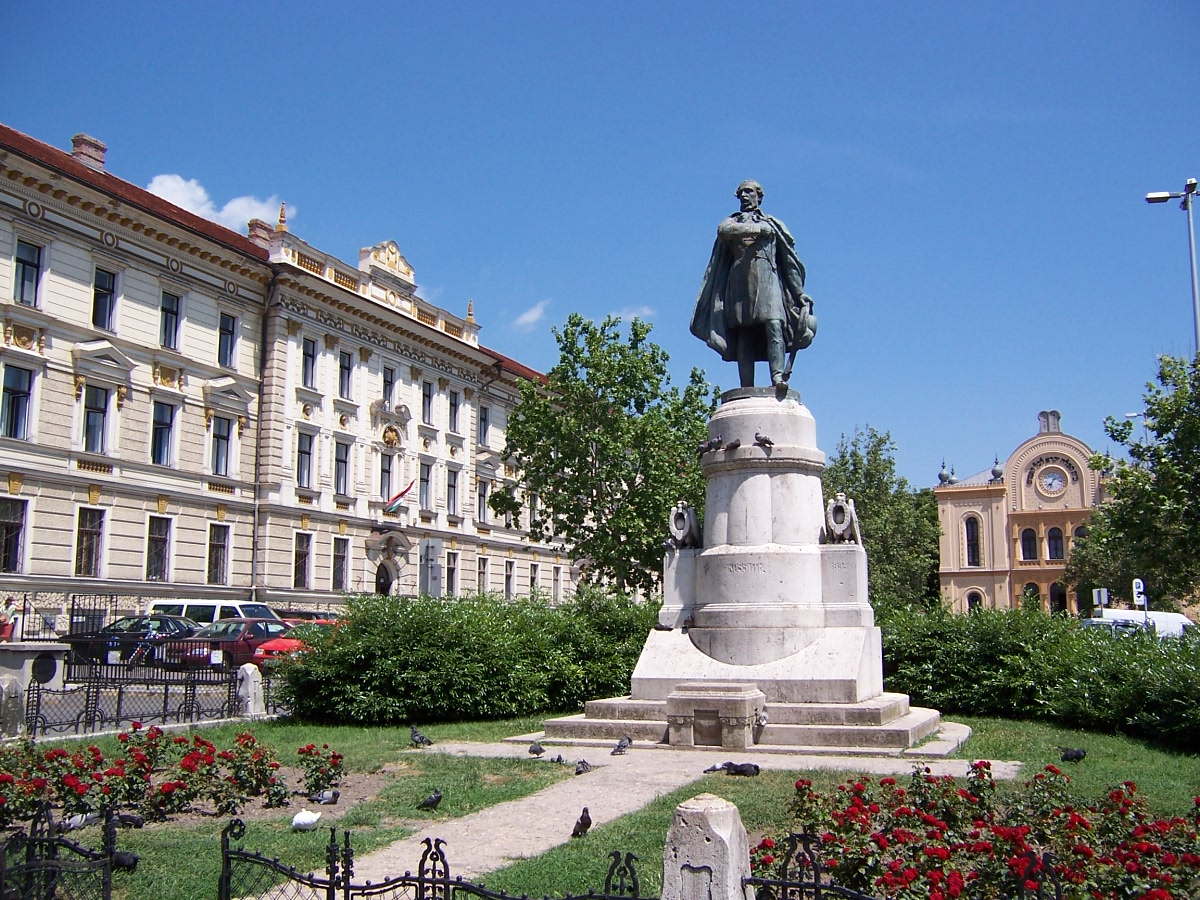
Lajos Kossuth statue

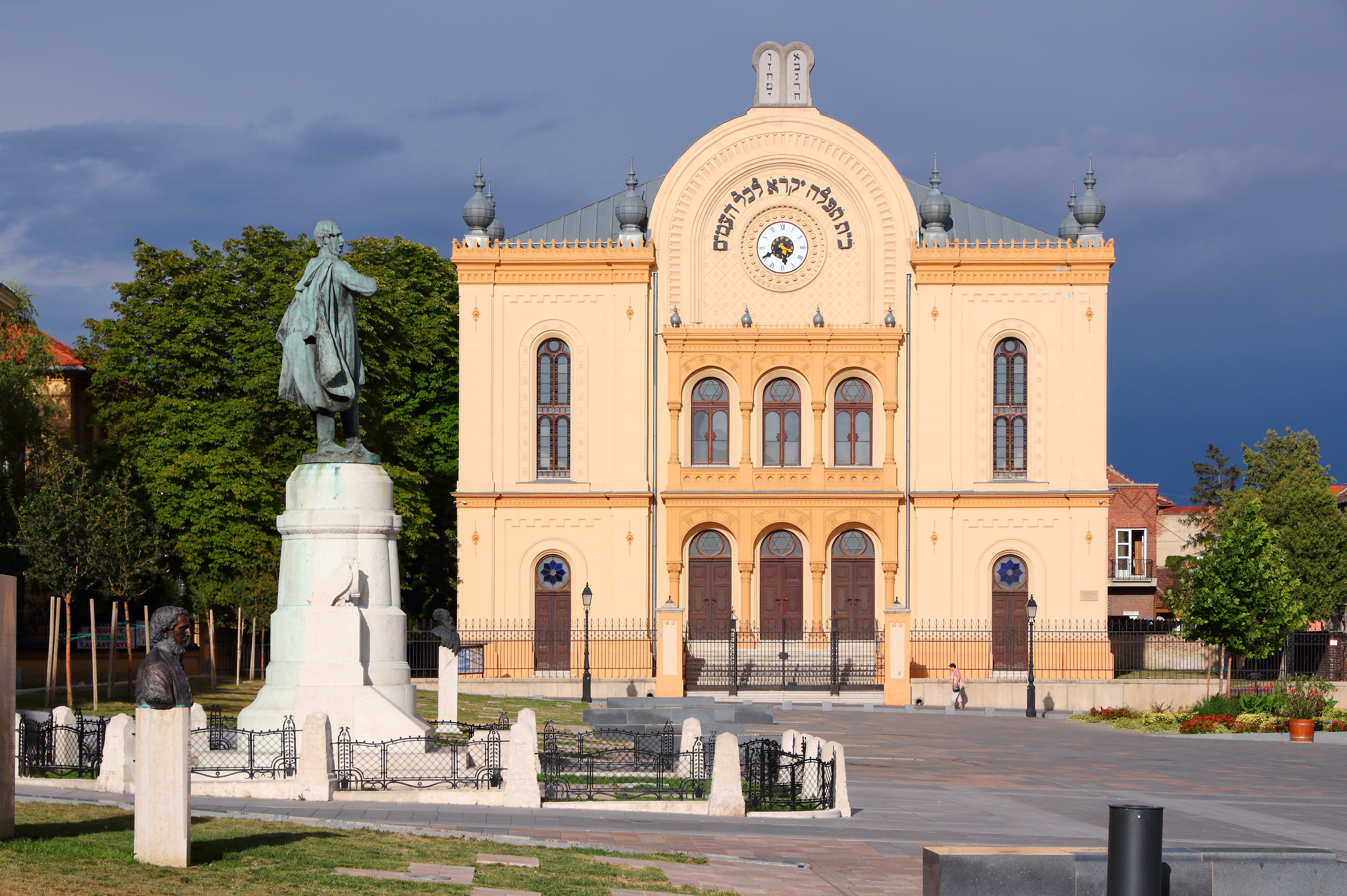
Kossuth square and Great Synagogue

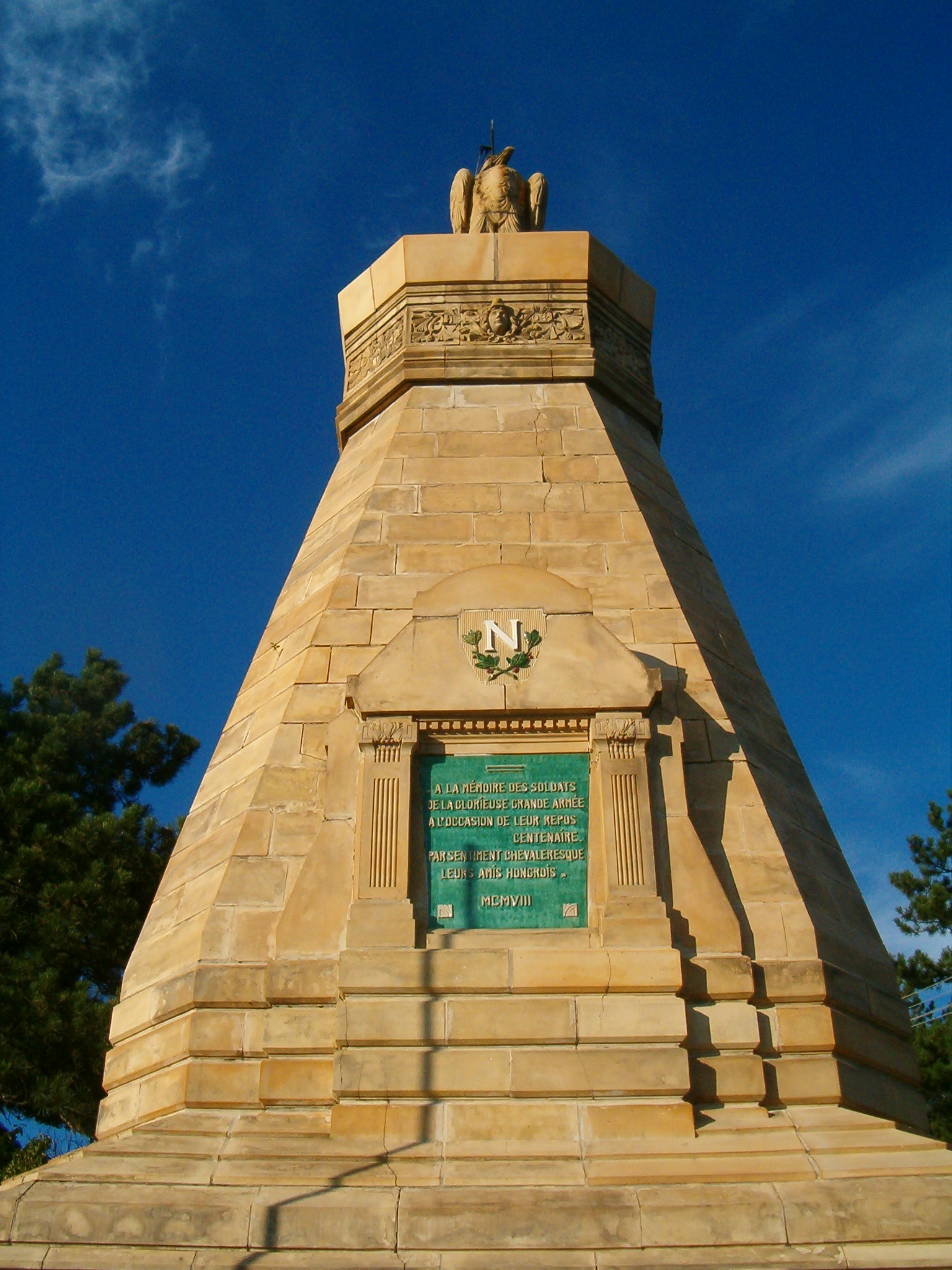
French (Napoleonic War) monument

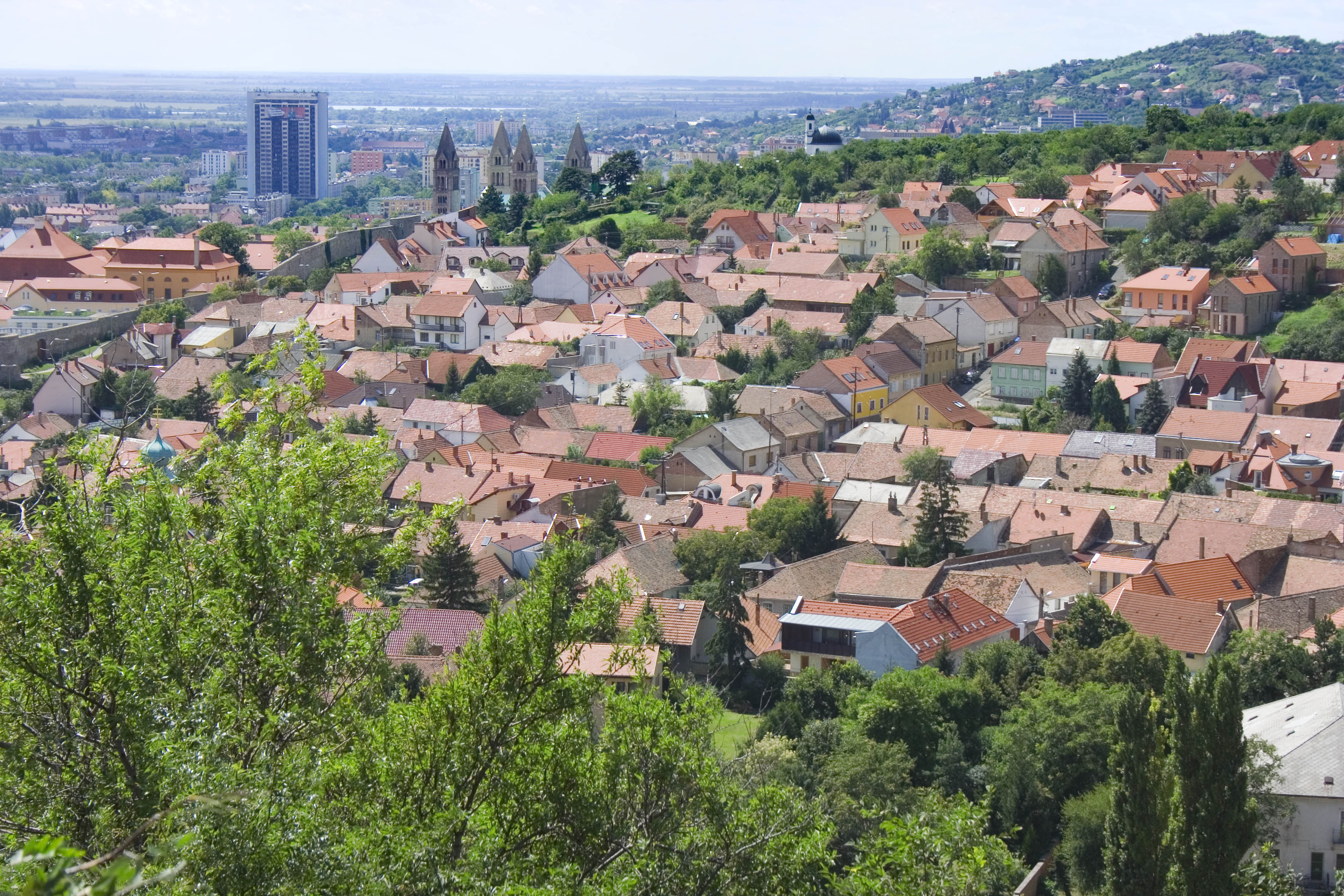
Tettye

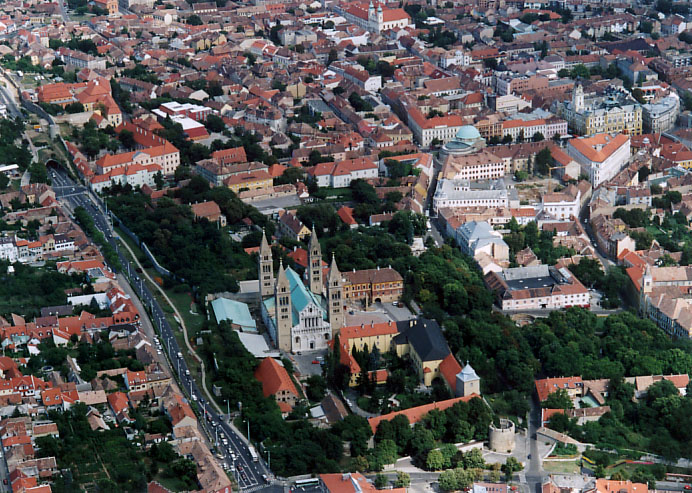
Aerial view

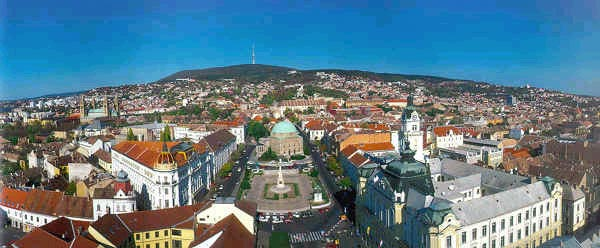
Panorama

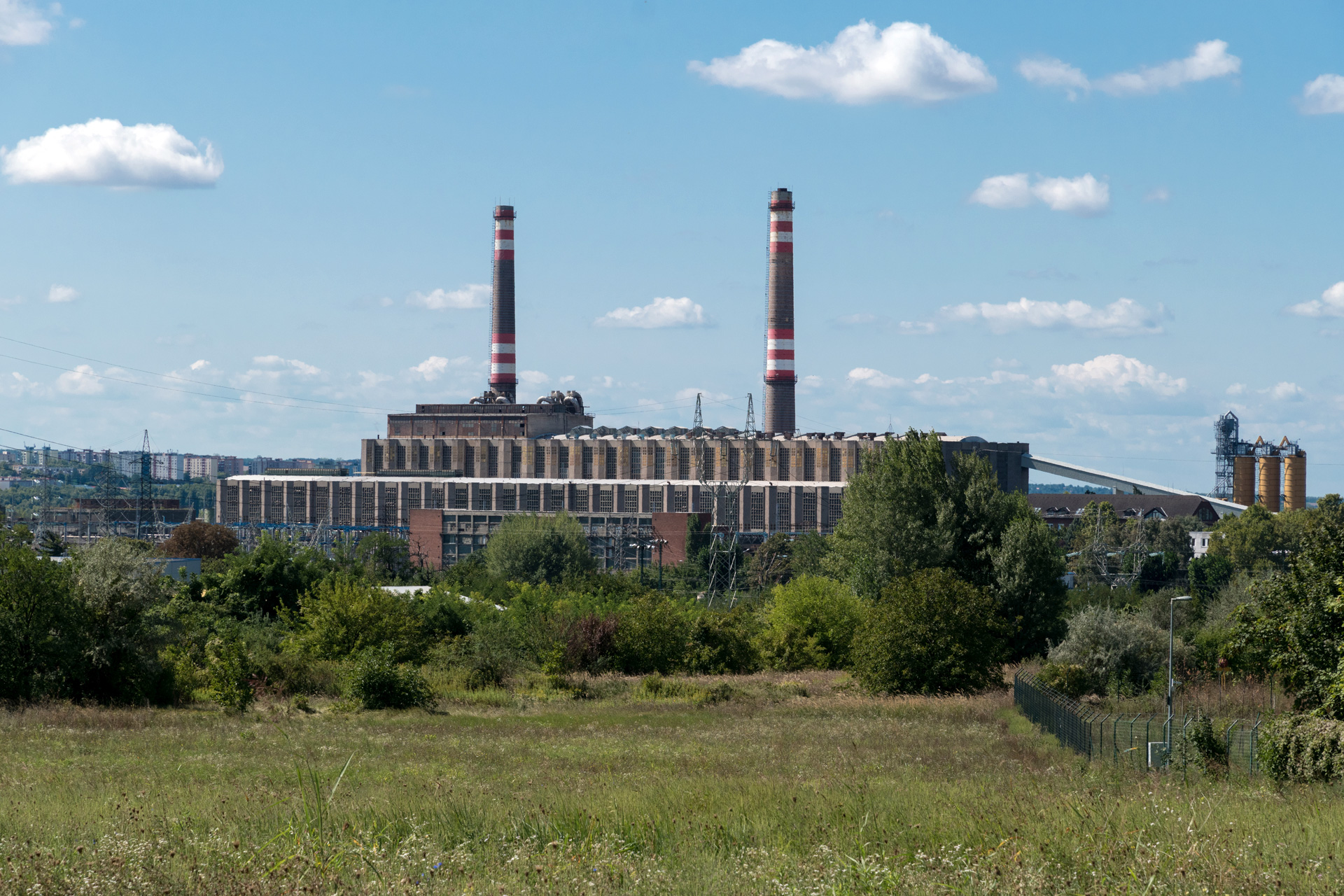
Pannonpower Energy Station

Logo of the 2010 European Capital of Culture

== See also ==
- Love padlocks
- Music of Pécs
- Pécs Brewery
- Pécs Power Station
- Lake Pécs
