= Budapest 9th constituency =

Constituency in Hungary (2011-)

Budapest 9th constituency (District X.)
- Constituency for the National Assembly
- Location of Budapest 09 within Budapest

- Location of Budapest within Hungary
- City: Budapest
- Electorate: 76,746 (2018)
- Major settlements: 10th District

Current constituency
- Created: 2011
- Party: Tisza Party
- Member: Vilmos Kátai-Németh
- Created from: Constituency no. 14; Constituency no. 26; Constituency no. 28
- Elected: 2026

The 9th constituency of Budapest (Hungarian: Budapesti 09. számú országgyűlési egyéni választókerület) is one of the single-member constituencies of the National Assembly, the national legislature of Hungary. The constituency standard abbreviation: Budapest 09. OEVK.

Since 2026, it has been represented by Vilmos Kátai-Németh of the Tisza party.

== Geography ==
The 9th constituency is located in the central part of Pest.

The constituency borders the Budapest 8th constituency and Budapest 13th constituency to the north, the Budapest 14th constituency and Budapest 15th constituency to the east, the Budapest 16th constituency to the south, and the Budapest 6th constituency to the south and west.

=== List of districts ===
The constituency includes the following municipalities:

1. District X.: Main part of the district (except Újhegy and Keresztúridűlő).
2. District XIX.: Northeastern part of the district (east of the Ady Endre út).

== History ==
The current 9th constituency of Budapest was created in 2011 and contains parts of the pre-2011 14th, 26th and 28th constituencies of Budapest. Its borders have not changed since its creation.

== Members ==
The constituency was first represented by Sándor Burány of MSZP (with Unity support) from 2014, and he was re-elected of Dialogue in 2018. In the 2026 election, Vilmos Kátai-Németh of the Tisza Party was elected representative.

| Election | Member | Party | % |
|---|---|---|---|
| 2014 (Note: Burány was a member of MSZP until 2018. He ran as a joint candidate of the Unity electoral alliance during the 2014 parliamentary election.) | Sándor Burány | MSZP | 38.8 |
| 2018 | Sándor Burány | Dialogue | 40.8 |
| 2022 | Gergely Arató | DK | 46.0 |
| 2026 | Vilmos Kátai-Németh | Tisza | 62.0 |

== Election result ==
=== 2026 election ===
Result 2026
1. Vilmos Kátai-Németh, TISZA (62.0%)
2. Nóra Király, Fidesz–KDNP (29.5%)
3. Erzsébet Rizmayerné Csik, Our Homeland (5.30%)
4. Attila Vadai, DK (1.70%)
5. Kornél Kiss, MKKP (1.30%)
6. Other parties (less than 1%) (0.20%)

2026 parliamentary election: Budapest - 2nd constituency
| Party | Candidate | Votes | % | ±% |
|---|---|---|---|---|
| Tisza | Vilmos Kátai-Németh | 36,852 | 61.98 | New |
| Fidesz–KDNP | Nóra Király | 17,538 | 29.50 | −13.05 |
| Mi Hazánk | Erzsébet Rizmayerné Csik | 3,164 | 5.32 | +0.90 |
| DK | Attila Vadai | 1,014 | 1.71 | New |
| MKKP | Kornél Kiss | 758 | 1.27 | −2.64 |
| Szolidaritás | Éva Pál | 134 | 0.23 | New |
| Majority | | 19,314 | 32.31 | +28.89 |
| Turnout | | 59,777 | 79.59 | ▲9.34 |
| Registered electors | | 75,105 | | |
| Tisza gain from United for Hungary | | Swing | | |

=== 2022 election ===
Result 2022
1. Gergely Arató, United for Hungary (46.0%)
2. Dr. Sándor Pap, Fidesz–KDNP (42.6%)
3. Csongor Vékony, Our Homeland (4.40%)
4. Klára Hankó, MKKP (3.90%)
5. Lajos László Détári, MEMO (2.20%)
6. Other parties (less than 1%) (0.90%)

2022 parliamentary election: Budapest - 9th constituency
| Party | Candidate | Votes | % | ±% |
|---|---|---|---|---|
| United for Hungary | Gergely Arató | 22,990 | 45.97 | |
| Fidesz–KDNP | Dr. Sándor Pap | 21,282 | 42.55 | +3.23 |
| Mi Hazánk | Csongor Vékony | 2,210 | 4.42 | New |
| MKKP | Klára Hankó | 1,957 | 3.91 | |
| MEMO | Lajos László Détári | 1,100 | 2.2 | New |
| NÉP | Kristóf Démény-Nagy | 292 | 0.58 | New |
| Leftist Alliance | Péter Gál | 180 | 0.36 | |
| Majority | | 1,708 | 3.42 | |
| Turnout | | 50,657 | 70.25 | ▼0.63 |
| Registered electors | | 72,110 | | |
| United for Hungary hold | | Swing | +2.0 | |

=== 2018 election ===
Result 2018
1. Sándor Burány, MSZP-P (40.8%)
2. Dr. István György, Fidesz–KDNP (39.3%)
3. István Tubák, Jobbik (10.1%)
4. Márta Demeter, LMP (6.50%)
5. Borbála Tölcsér, Momentum (2.10%)
6. Other parties (less than 1%) (1.20%)

2018 parliamentary election: Budapest - 9th constituency
| Party | Candidate | Votes | % | ±% |
|---|---|---|---|---|
| MSZP–Dialogue | Sándor Burány | 22,010 | 40.78 | as Unity |
| Fidesz–KDNP | Dr. István György | 21,222 | 39.32 | +1.81 |
| Jobbik | István Tubák | 5,437 | 10.07 | −3.81 |
| LMP | Márta Demeter | 3,522 | 6.53 | −0.15 |
| Momentum | Borbála Tölcsér | 1,139 | 2.11 | New |
| Workers' Party | László Kerezsi | 223 | 0.41 | −0.36 |
| MIÉP | Tibor Závoczki | 114 | 0.21 | |
| Common Ground | Margit Erzsébet Pálfi | 81 | 0.15 | |
| Go Hungary! | Tivadar Lantos | 68 | 0.13 | |
| Nation and Peace | Csaba Kovács | 68 | 0.13 | |
| Iránytű | Sándor Kara | 58 | 0.11 | |
| Lendülettel | Ildikó Ilona Postásné Balázs | 34 | 0.06 | |
| Majority | | 788 | 1.46 | |
| Turnout | | 54,398 | 70.88 | ▲7.15 |
| Registered electors | | 76,746 | | |
| MSZP–Dialogue hold | | Swing | +0.2 | |

=== 2014 election ===
Result 2014
1. Sándor Burány, Unity (38.8%)
2. Dr. István György, Fidesz–KDNP (37.5%)
3. István Tubák, Jobbik (13.9%)
4. Balázs Tóth, LMP (6.70%)
5. Other parties (less than 1%) (3.10%)

2014 parliamentary election: Budapest - 9th constituency
| Party | Candidate | Votes | % | ±% |
|---|---|---|---|---|
| Unity | Sándor Burány | 19,501 | 38.81 | |
| Fidesz–KDNP | Dr. István György | 18,851 | 37.51 | |
| Jobbik | István Tubák | 6,975 | 13.88 | |
| LMP | Balázs Tóth | 3,356 | 6.68 | |
| Workers' Party | László Kerezsi | 389 | 0.77 | |
| SMS | Katalin Márta Mészárosné Rostás | 349 | 0.69 | |
| Together 2014 | Zoltán János Göncző | 286 | 0.57 | |
| JESZ | István Tibor Varga | 168 | 0.33 | |
| EP | Zsigmond László Vass | 138 | 0.27 | |
| FKGP | Sándor Kara | 100 | 0.2 | |
| MCP | István Lajos Balogh | 33 | 0.07 | |
| ÚDP | Zsolt Kállai | 32 | 0.06 | |
| MCF | Julianna Kovács | 26 | 0.05 | |
| ÚMP | Lajos Jónás | 26 | 0.05 | |
| EU.ROM | András Mata | 20 | 0.04 | |
| Majority | | 650 | 1.3 | |
| Turnout | | 50,735 | 63.73 | |
| Registered electors | | 79,611 | | |
| Unity win (new seat) | | | | |
