= Beer in Hungary =

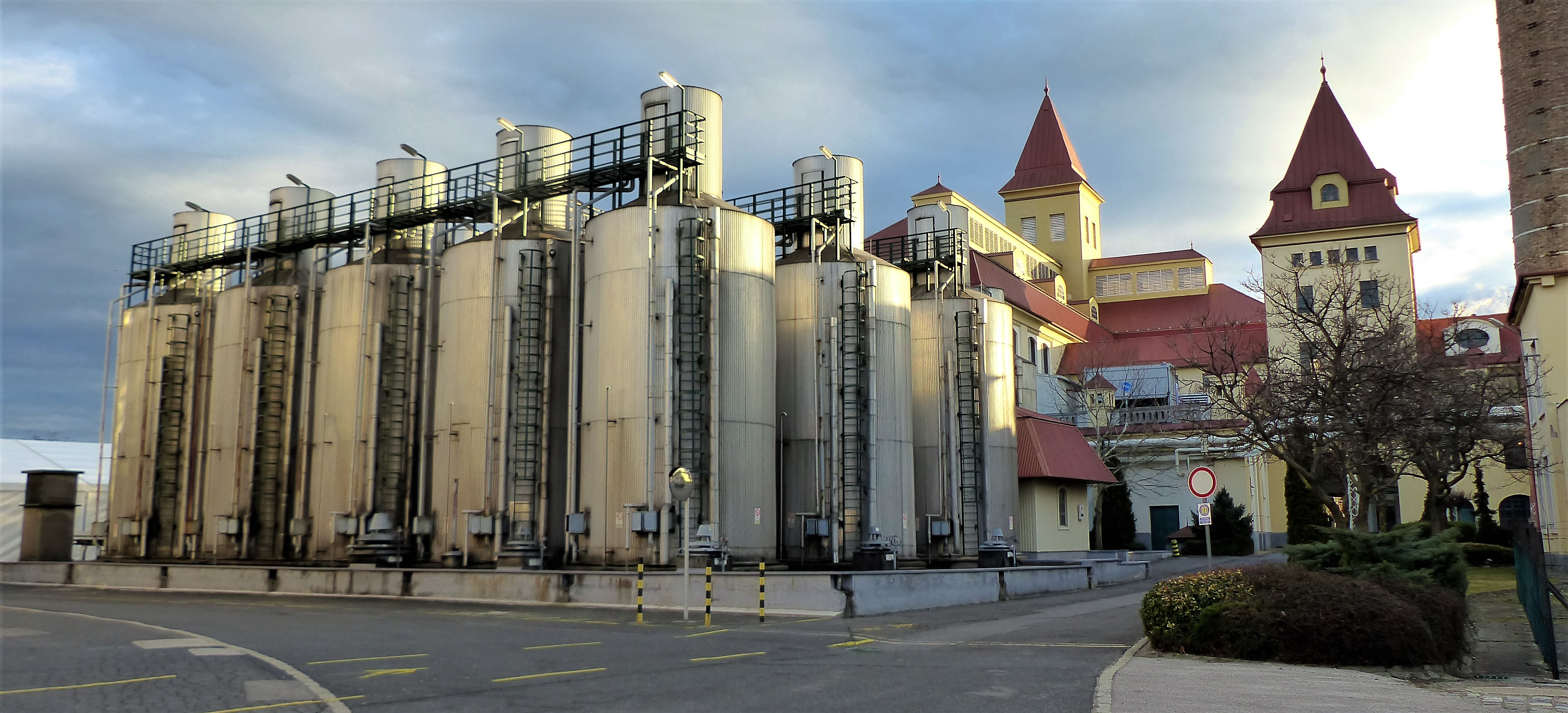
Dreher Brewery

Beer in Hungary has been brewed for well over a thousand years and the country has a significant history of commercial beer production.

== Etymology ==
The Hungarian word for beer is sör, which sounds almost like the English word sure. The word itself is of Oghuric origin. The word was most probably borrowed by the Hungarians in the era before the conquest of Hungary.

== History ==
The first commercial brewery in Hungary was established in Buda in 1854 by Peter Schmidt. During the heyday of the Austro-Hungarian Empire, the Kőbánya district of Budapest became the centre of Hungary's brewing industry. The Dreher brewery is named after Anton Dreher, the creator of the Vienna lager style. He created the brewery in Budapest in 1862 and it came to dominate the Hungarian market before the Second World War.

== Breweries ==
Today, Hungary has four large commercial brewers which produce mainly light lagers (Hungarian: világos) and German-style dark beers (bocks, Hungarian: barna).

Name	Owner	Founder	Famous products	Location	Website
Dreher Breweries (Dreher Sörgyárak)	Asahi Breweries	Peter Schmidt (est. 1854); Anton Dreher (est. 1862)	Dreher Classic; Arany Ászok; Kőbányai Világos (pilsener-style lagers); Dreher Bak (a double bock)	Kőbánya, Budapest	
Borsod Brewery (Borsodi Sörgyár)	Molson Coors Brewing Company	Magyar Országos Söripari Vállalat (est. 1973)	Borsodi Világos; Borsodi Bivaly; Borsodi Póló; Borsodi Búza; Borostyán (English: Amber)	Bőcs, Borsod-Abaúj-Zemplén	
Heineken Hungária (Heineken Magyarország)	Heineken	Julius Lenck (est. 1895)	Soproni; Talléros (English: Coin Worth); Arany Hordó (English: Golden Barrel); Soproni Kinizsi; Sárkány Sör (English: Dragon Beer)	Sopron, Győr-Moson-Sopron	
Pécs Brewery (Pécsi Sörfőzde)	Szemerey family	Leopold Hirschfeld (1848)	Pécsi Szalon; Szalon Barna; Tavaszi Sör (English: Spring Beer); Három Király (English: Three Kings)	Pécs, Baranya	

Lately, some microbreweries have also set up in Hungary, such as Fóti, Legenda, Monyó, Csupor or Mad Scientist. In the 2010s, a lively craft beer scene evolved, with numerous local breweries, festivals and bottleshops.

== Economy ==
In the 1980s, beer consumption was roughly 100 litres per person, but since then it has declined to nearer seventy.Pale lager has about 90% of sales.

== Culture ==
In Hungary, people traditionally do not clink their glasses or mugs when drinking beer. There is an urban legend in Hungarian culture that Austrian generals clinked their beer glasses to celebrate the execution of the 13 Martyrs of Arad in 1849. Many people still follow the tradition, although younger people often disavow it, citing that the vow was only meant to last 150 years.

== See also ==
- Beer and breweries by region
- National symbols of Hungary
