= Sándor Burány =

Hungarian politician

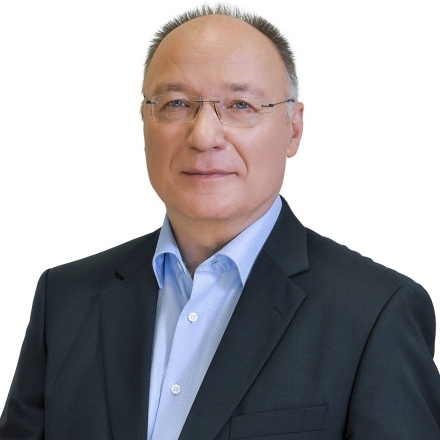

Minister of Employment and Labour
- In office 3 March 2003 – 3 October 2004
- Preceded by: Péter Kiss
- Succeeded by: Gábor Csizmár

Member of the National Assembly
- In office 28 June 1994 – 1 May 2022

Personal details
- Born: 19 August 1956 (age 69) Budapest, Hungary
- Party: MSZMP (1982–1989); MSZP (since 1989)
- Other political affiliations: Dialogue
- Children: 2
- Profession: Economist, Politician

Sándor Burány (born 19 August 1956) is a Hungarian economist and politician, who served as Minister of Employment and Labour from 2003 to 2004, in the cabinet of Péter Medgyessy. He was a member of the National Assembly (MP) from 1994 to 2022.

== Profession ==
Burány was born in Budapest on 19 August 1956. He raised in Kispest, the 19th district of the capital. He graduated and obtained an electronic technician qualification at the Latinca Sándor Secondary School of Mechanical and Electrical Engineering in 1974. After finishing secondary studies, he worked for the Ganz Instrument Works (GMM) as a technician from 1974 to 1981. He earned a degree in instrument manufacturing and maintenance technician in 1977. He completed compulsory military service between 1979 and 1980. He was administrative rapporteur from 1981 to 1986 and head of the internal audit capability from 1986 to 1988 at his workplace.

Meanwhile, in a course of evening class from 1982 to 1987, Burány graduated from the Faculty of Industry of the Károly Marx University of Economic Sciences (MKKE) with a degree in design and organization. He also attended Századvég Political School between 1991 and 1992.

== Political career ==
Burány was a member of the ruling Communist party, the Hungarian Socialist Workers' Party (MSZMP) from 1982 to 1989. He was employed by the economic policy division of the party's 19th district commission between 1988 and 1989. Following the transition to democracy, he was a founding member of the Hungarian Socialist Party (MSZP) in 1989. He served as chairman of the party's local branch in Kispest between 1990 and 1994. In 1992, he became a member of the national electoral board. From 1998 to 2004 he was a member of the national presidium of the Socialist Party. He functioned chairman of the Budapest branch of the party between 2007 and 2012.

Burány was elected Member of Parliament for Kispest (Budapest Constituency XXVIII) in the 1994 parliamentary election. He was re-elected MP in 1998, 2002 and 2006 too. He was a member of the parliament's Committee on Budgets and Finance from 1994 to 2002 and the Committee on Tourism from 1998 to 2000. He served as deputy leader of MSZP parliamentary group in various times (1998–2000, 2004–2006, 2016–2018).

After the 2002 election, when the Socialist Party defeated Fidesz and Prime Minister Péter Medgyessy formed his government, Burány was appointed Secretary of State for Political Affairs in the Ministry of Finance, serving in this capacity from 27 May 2002 to 2 March 2003. He served as Minister of Employment and Labour between 3 March 2003 and 3 October 2004. After the resignation of Medgyessy, he lost his ministerial position but became an economic consultant of the new premier Ferenc Gyurcsány from 2004 to 2006. After brief services in the Committee on Education and Science and Committee on Youth and Sport (2004), Burány was a member of the Committee on Informatics and Telecommunications from 2004 to 2006 and Economic Committee from 2005 to 2006. Following the victorious 2006 parliamentary election, he became a member of the Development Policy Steering Board (FIT). Beside that, he also worked for the Committee on Budgets, Finance and the Court of Auditors from 2006 to 2007. He was appointed state secretary of the Prime Minister's Office on 1 January 2007. He held the office until 14 May 2008 (the formation of Gyurcsány minority cabinet), when he was appointed state secretary in the Ministry of National Development and Economy. He retained this position in the cabinet of Gordon Bajnai too, until 29 May 2010.

The Socialist Party suffered a heavy defeat in the 2010 parliamentary election, when Fidesz won a two-third majority and Viktor Orbán formed his cabinet. Burány was also defeated by Fidesz candidate Richárd Tarnai in Kispest, nevertheless he obtained a mandate from his party's Budapest regional list. He was a member of the Economic and Informatics Committee in this parliamentary term. Burány was elected MP for Kőbánya (Budapest Constituency IX) in the 2014 parliamentary election. He served as chairman of the Committee on Budgets from 2014 to 2016 and was a member of the Legislative Committee from 2016 to 2022. Burány was re-elected MP for Kőbánya in the 2018 parliamentary election as a joint candidate of MSZP and Dialogue for Hungary (PM). He joined PM parliamentary group thereafter, to make it possible to form a separate PM faction with a minimum of five people. Burány retained his membership in the Socialist Party.

Burány ran as joint candidate of the MSZP and Dialogue in Kőbánya during the 2021 Hungarian opposition primary, but was defeated by Democratic Coalition politician Gergely Arató. Consequently, Burány did not participate in the 2022 parliamentary election and lost his parliamentary seat after 28 years.

== Legal issues ==
His parliamentary immunity was suspended in July 2018 on a charge of driving under the influence of alcohol took place in January 2018. Burány admitted to drinking before sitting in the car. He wrote that "he drank beer in the company of his loved ones" and then made one of the "biggest mistakes of his life, which he sincerely regrets and takes responsibility for".

Political offices
Preceded by Péter Kiss	Minister of Employment and Labour; 2003–2004	Succeeded by Gábor Csizmár
