= Vilmos Kátai-Németh =

Hungarian politician

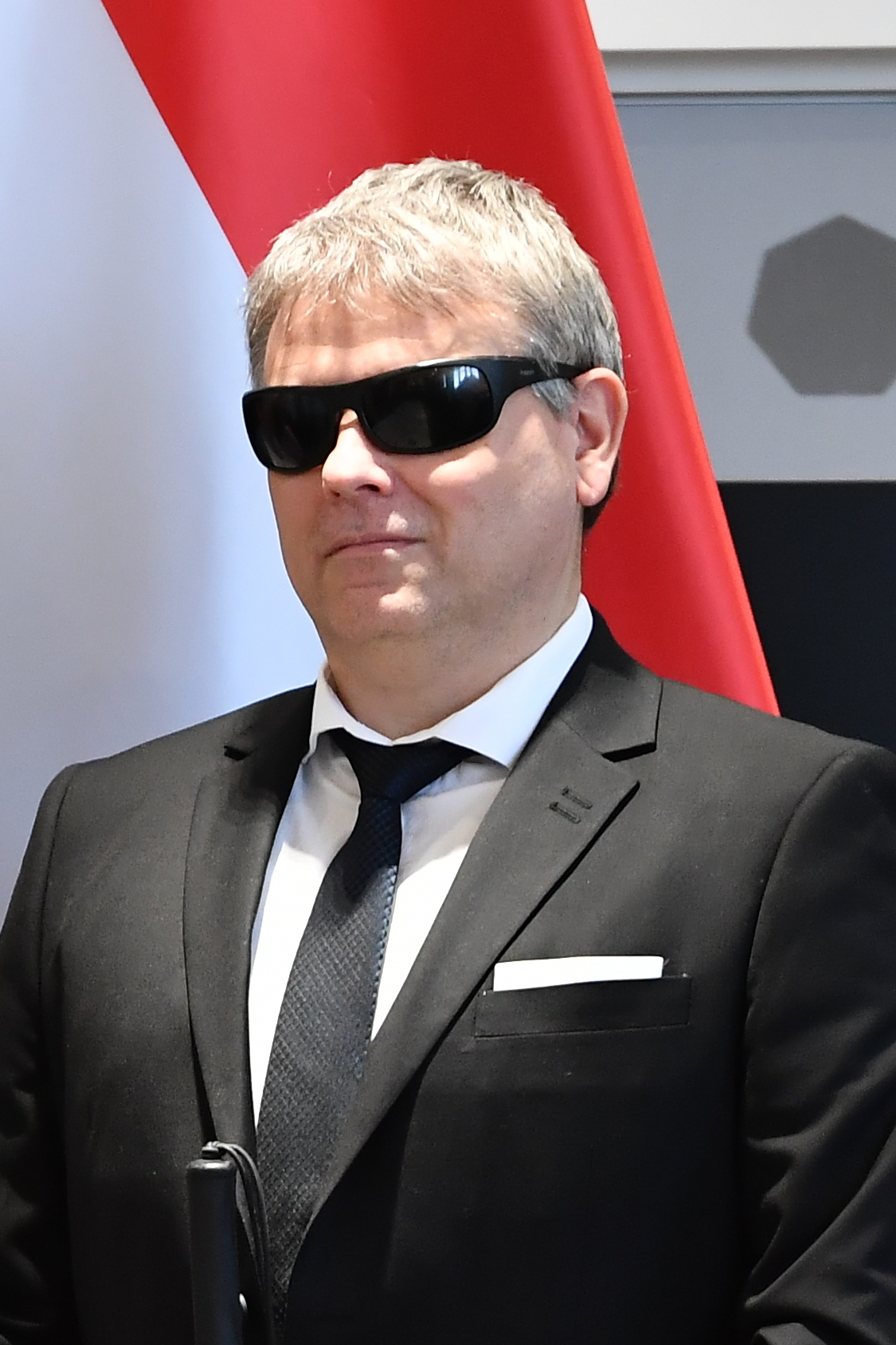
- Katai-Nemeth in 2026

Minister of Social and Family Affairs
- Incumbent
- Assumed office 13 May 2026
- Prime Minister: Péter Magyar
- Preceded by: Katalin Novák (2021; as Minister for Family Affairs)

Member of the National Assembly
- Incumbent
- Assumed office 9 May 2026
- Preceded by: Gergely Arató
- Constituency: Budapest 9th

Personal details
- Party: TISZA

Vilmos Kátai-Németh is a Hungarian politician who was elected member of the National Assembly in 2026. He lost his vision at the age of 16 and later became the first-ever blind aikido master in the world.

On April 24, 2026, he was announced to be the designate for Minister of Social and Family Affairs in the Magyar Government, making him the first blind minister in the country's history.
