= Pécs Brewery =

Brewery in Pécs, Baranya County, Hungary

- Type: Privately held company
- Industry: Alcoholic beverages
- Founded: 1848
- Founder: Leopold Hirschfeld
- Headquarters: 94 Alkotmány utca 7624, Pécs, Baranya, Hungary
- Area served: Central Europe
- Products: Szalon Világos; Szalon Barna; Szalon Alkoholmentes (alcoholfree); Pécsi Sör Prémium Lager
- Owner: Szemerey family
- Website: pecsisor.hu

Pécs Brewery or Brewery of Pécs (Hungarian: Pécsi Sörfőzde, pronounced [ˈpeːt͡ʃi ˈʃørføːzdɛ]) is one of the four big breweries in Hungary and the biggest in the Southern Transdanubia located in Pécs, the capital of Baranya County in southwestern Hungary.

== History ==
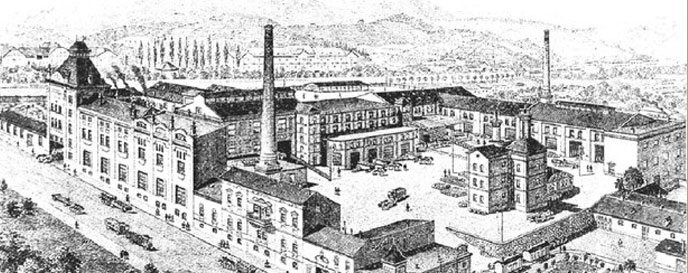
Pécs Brewery in the 1860s

The brewery was founded in 1848 by Hirschfeld Lipót (Leopold Hirschfeld). Following the death of Leopold Hirschfeld, his son Sámuel took over the brewery. He expanded the facilities and drilled a spring to provide a supply of good quality water. The Szalon Sör brand was registered as a trademark by the Iparkamara (Industry Chamber) in 1907, and is still produced under that name today. In 1911, Sámuel founded the company that would later become known as Pécsi Sörfőzde Rt. It was first known as Hirschfeld S. Sörgyár Részvénytársaság (S. Hirschfeld Brewery Incorporated).

In the following years, the company managed to stay successful and continue operations through the depression, and both world wars. The company was nationalized during the communist takeover following World War II, but during the 1970s and 1980s experienced growth and development that would increase the capacity of the brewery to its current size. In 1992, several years after communism had ended in Hungary, the company again returned to a private corporation. During the privatization in 1993, a large portion of the company was purchased by the Austrian Ottakringer Group. The new ownership and additional capital helped the modernization efforts of the brewery. In 1994, the company name was changed to Pécsi Sörfőzde Rt. (Brewery of Pécs, Inc.). Throughout Austrian Ottakringer ownership Pécs still ran independently of its parent organization, as a truly Hungarian brewery. In 2017, Ottakringer sold Pécs to MAVA Befektetesi and BanKonzult Commerce, one again returning to Hungarian ownership.

== Company ==
In 2000, Pécsi Sörfőzde Rt. was 78% owned by Ottakringer of Vienna, Austria, with another 6% in the hands of Brau Union AG. Despite the fact that such a large percentage of the company was in Austrian ownership, the company still mainted a distinct independence and pride in being a Hungarian brewery.

In 2017, Pécsi Sörfőzde was returned to Hungarian ownership under a sale by Ottakringer to MAVA Befektetesi and BanKonzult Commerce.

== Beers ==
As of October 2005, Pécsi Sörfőzde produces 8 kinds of beer. Six of them are traditional Hungarian brands, while the other two are produced under license from the parent company. The brewery also distributes and sells three Austrian brands within Hungary. The products are sold in bottles (0.33L, 0.5L, 0.66L), cans (0.5L), six packs (6 x 0.5L), barrels (30L, 50L) or any combination thereof. The beers are best known in the Dél-Dunántúl (Southern Transdanubia) region, but they can be found throughout the country as well.

- Szalon Sör (4.6% alcohol, pale ale) – Essentially, the flagship of the brewery, the Szalon világos sör has been around since 1907, when it was registered as a trademark. Since then, it has gained popularity throughout Hungary.
- Szalon Félbarna (5.5% alcohol, semi-dark beer) – The newest addition to the product line, this beer combines the lighter taste of a pale ale, and the stronger taste of a darker German-style beer.
- Szalon Barna (5.8% alcohol, dark German style) – This beer has proven to be a valuable product for the brewery since it was introduced next to the Szalon Sör in 1994.
- Három Királyok (6.6% alcohol, seasonal beer) – Három Királyok (Three Kings) was introduced in 1999 as a seasonal beer produced for a limited time around Christmas and New Year's Eve. It is also the highest alcohol beer produced by the brewery
- Tavaszi Sör (4.8% alcohol, seasonal beer) – Tavaszi Sör (Spring Beer) is another seasonal offering of the company that was introduced around the same time as Három Királyok. As the name states, the beer is produced in the spring time, and is somewhat lighter than its winter counterpart, befitting the season.
- Radler (1.4% alcohol, soft drink-beer) – Introduced in a complete untouched segment, the Radler is a light, low-alcohol beer that is essentially a combination of lemonade and beer.
- Gold Fassl Pils (4.8% alcohol, Pilsner) – Owned by the parent company, Ottakringer, and licensed to Pécsi Sörfőzde for brewing in Hungary, this is a light Vienna lager.
- Gold Fassl Spezial (5.3% alcohol, pale ale) – This somewhat heavier, golden-colored ale originally from Vienna is also produced under license in Hungary.

In addition to the seven listed above, the brewery also sells three other Austrian brands. Ottakringer Helles (5.2% alc.) famous in Vienna, and the Schneider Weisse (5.4% alc.) unfiltered wheat beer originally from Bavaria in southern Germany are the two alcoholic ones. The Null Komma Josef is a non-alcoholic beer sold only in small 0.33L bottles, which is a valuable addition to the product family, since Hungary has a zero tolerance policy for driving while intoxicated (maximum 0.0% allowable blood alcohol level).

In addition to widely distributed beers, the brewery also produces "Pécsi sör" on a microbrewery basis. This special unfiltered beer (5.2% alc.) is only available in a limited number of licensed establishments in Pécs (the most locally known is Cellárium).

== See also ==
- Pécsi Sörfőzde
- Sör (beer)
