= Dreher Breweries =

Brewery in Budapest, Hungary

- Native name: Dreher Sörgyárak
- Type: brewery
- Founded: 1854 Kőbányai Serfőző Társaság (Kőbánya Brewery Corporation); 1862 Dreher Sörgyár (Dreher Brewery)
- Founder: Anton Dreher
- Headquarters: Budapest, Hungary
- Products: beer
- Owner: Asahi Breweries
- Website: dreherzrt.hu

Dreher (Kőbánya) Brewery (Dreher Sörgyárak) in Budapest is owned by Asahi Breweries. Its main products are the Dreher Gold, Arany Ászok and Kőbányai Világos pilsener-style lagers but it also brews Dreher Bak (a double bock), a full-bodied dark beer with a slight taste of caramel.

Until its closure Kanizsa Brewery also belonged to the group, and produced beer under the Dreher Classic, Kanizsai Világos, Kanizsai Kinizsi, Balatoni Világos and Paracelsus brands.

Dreher Brewery was owned by the South African Breweries since 1993, and subsequently by SABMiller since 2002. As part of the agreements made with regulators before Anheuser-Busch InBev was allowed to acquire SABMiller in October 2016, Dreher was sold to Asahi Breweries of Japan on December 13, 2016; the deal was expected to close during the first half of 2017.

== History of the company ==
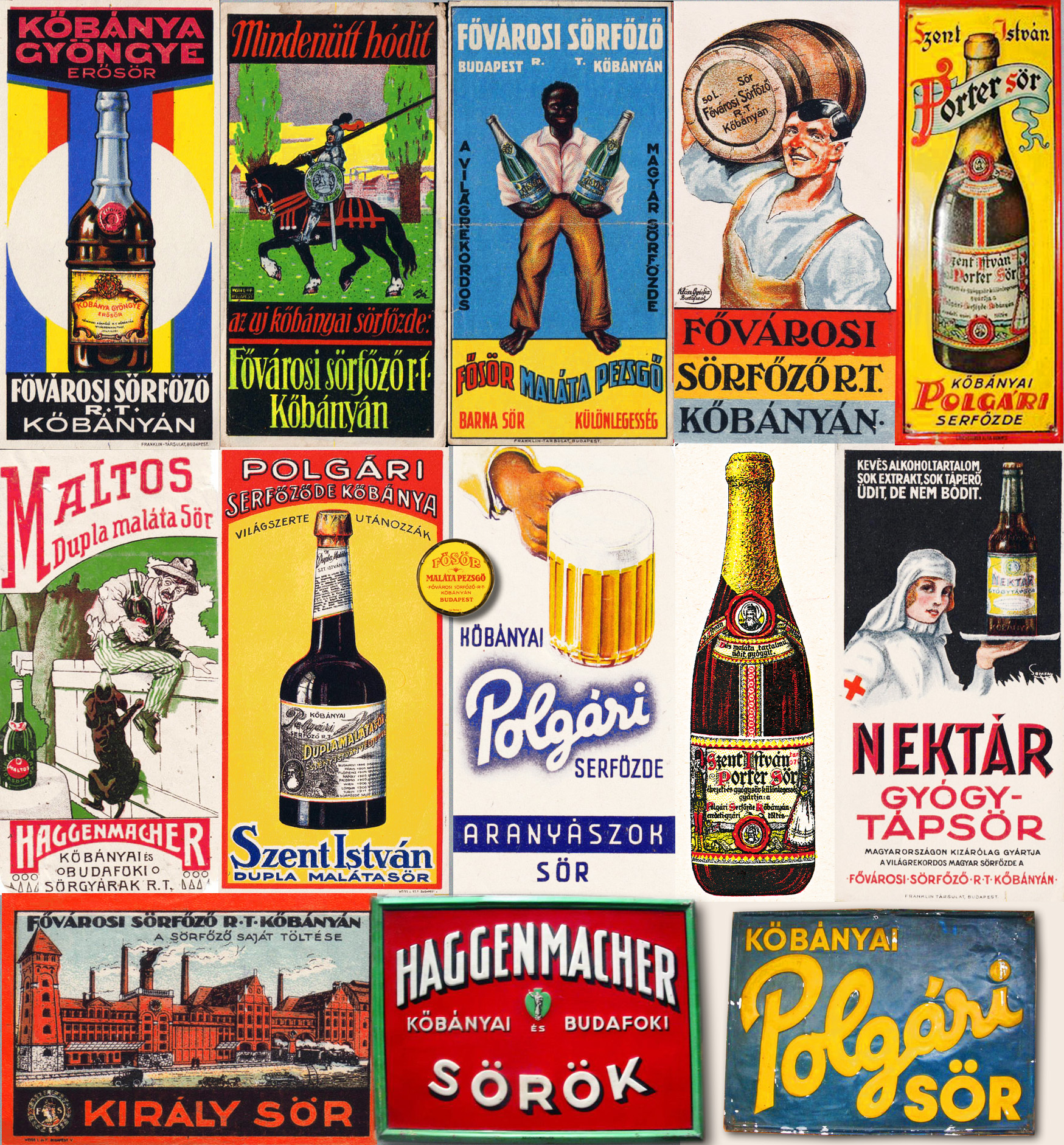
Advertisement of famous products of the company in 1930s

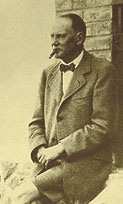
Jenő Dreher at the horse races (he was a rider before he took over his father's business in Hungary)

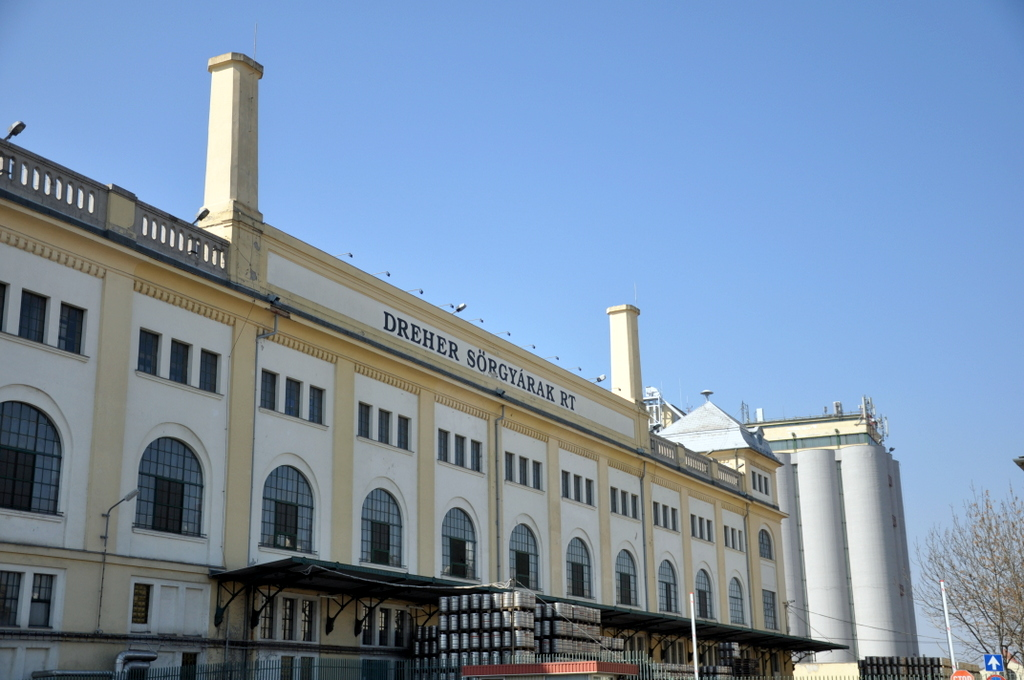
The headquarters in Kőbánya, Budapest

Anton Dreher was an Austrian brewer magnate.

Today, Dreher Breweries Ltd. is one of the three leading players in the Hungarian beer market. The brewery still operates in Kőbánya, in the restored brewery.

- 1854 – Peter Schmidt founder of “Kőbányai Serfőző Társaság” produced the first “Kőbányai Ser”
- 1862 – Anton Dreher, the “King of Beer” bought the “Kőbányai Serház”.
- 1870 – Anton Dreher Jr. took over the leadership of the company. He developed the technology and capacity of his factories, and Kőbánya soon became the largest brewery of Hungary.
- 1905 – Among his three sons, Anton Dreher Jr. entrusted Jenő with the management of the Kőbánya brewery, which became a corporation in 1907 under the name "Dreher Antal Kőbányai Serfőzdéje”. The company was the local market leader till World War I.
- 1923 – Jenő Dreher continued to buy shares from the capitals of his competitors, from Haggenmacher Kőbányai and Budafoki Rt., Barber and Klusemann Brewery and the "Első Magyar Részvény Serfőzde”. The „Dreher Kombinát”, which was merged from these companies in 1923, bought up the "Királyi Serfőzde” of Kanizsa in 1928 also.
- 1933 – "Dreher-Haggenmacher Első Magyar Részvény Serfőzde” was launched, which ruled 70% of the market with its beers.
- 1948 – The property of the family kept in Hungary was taken into state ownership.
- 1949 – Establishment of "Kőbányai Sörgyárak Nemzeti Vállalat”.
- 1981 – Birth of the independent “Kőbányai Sörgyár”.
- 1992 – “Kőbányai Sörgyár” was converted into a shareholding company.
- 1993 – The brewery became a member of the South African Breweries (SAB).
- 1997 – The company took up the name “Dreher Sörgyárak Ltd”.
- 2002 – The South African Breweries merged with the Miller Brewing Company to create the SABMiller group, which is the second largest brewing company of the world, with brewing interests or distribution agreements in over 60 countries across six continents. SABMiller plc is listed in the London Stock Exchange and the Johannesburg stock exchange, and its international brand portfolio includes brands such as Pilsner Urquell, Peroni Nastro Azzurro, Miller Genuine Draft, and Castle Lager.
- 2017 – Sold to Asahi Breweries of Japan.

== Hungarian brands ==
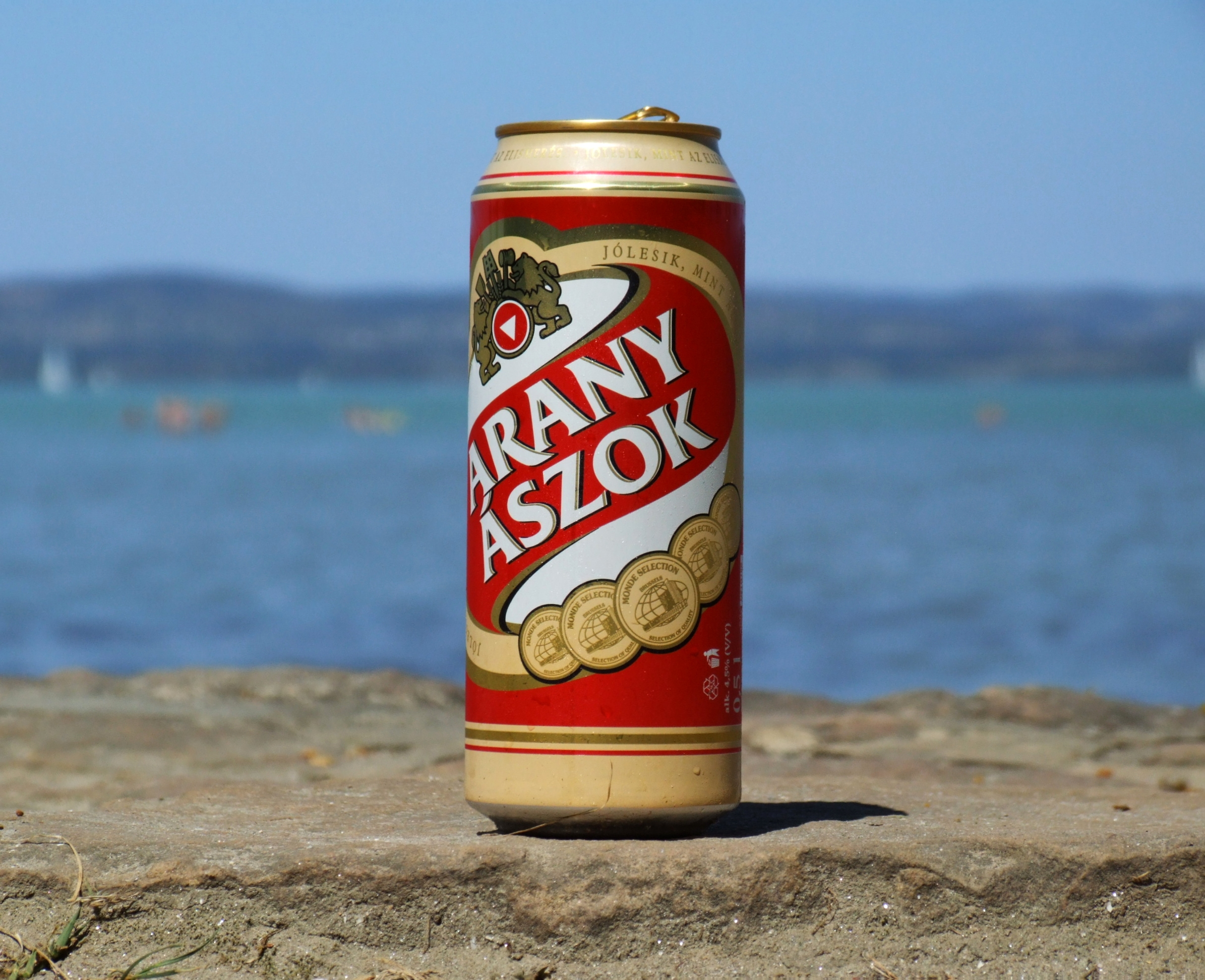
Arany Ászok beer - the beer of the Hungarian Summer at Lake Balaton

- Dreher Gold
- Dreher Bak
- Dreher Red Ale
- Dreher Pale Ale
- Dreher Hidegkomlós (dry hopped)
- Dreher Alkoholmentes
- Arany Ászok
- Arany Ászok Alkoholmentes
- Kőbányai Sör

== Import brands ==
- Pilsner Urquell
- Hofbrau Weissbier
- Floris
- Peroni
- Asahi Superdry
- Kozel Černý
- Captain Jack
- Kingswood cider

== Licensed brands ==
- Kozel
- Hofbräu

== Sponsorship ==
From 1966 to 1969, Dreher sponsored the points classification in the Giro d'Italia, and from 1970 to 1972 it sponsored a cycling team.

== See also ==
- Beer in Hungary
