= Imre Pesti =

Hungarian politician (born 1952)

Member of the National Assembly
- Incumbent
- Assumed office 16 May 2006

Personal details
- Born: 16 September 1952 (age 73) Budapest, Hungary
- Party: Fidesz
- Other political affiliations: MDF
- Profession: physician

Dr. Imre Pesti (born September 16, 1952) is a Hungarian physician, politician, and member of the National Assembly (MP) from Fidesz Budapest Regional List from 2006 to 2014, and his party's national list since 2014. He served as Deputy Mayor of Budapest for Health and Social Affairs in 2010.

== Biography ==
Pesti grow up in the Galga valley in the village of Tura. He is married, with two children. He attended to the Piarist Secondary School in Budapest. After the secondary school final examinations he applied for continuing his studies at the Medical Science University of Szeged but during the entrance examination advised him to leave because of his religional belief. He gained entrance to the Semmelweis University three years later. He graduated as a M.D. from the Semmelweis University in 1980. He was working in Galgamácsa as a family doctor for eight years and later continued at the Cardiology Department of the Bajcsy-Zsilinszky Hospital. He acquired a special examination of internal medicine and cardiology. Before his university years and later as a medical student and as a doctor altogether he worked 17 years for the ambulance service. In 2003 he acquired degree from a two years course of special health manager course. Now he is leading a medical related business and often participates in international medicine researches. He is member of the Hungarian Cardiology Association.

He was a founding member of the Hungarian Democratic Forum (MDF) in 1988 in Gödöllő, but later he retired from political activity. In 2002 the newly established civic circles by Viktor Orbán called him to return to politics and he was elected head of the Civic Circle of Rákosmente (District XVII, Budapest). In the parliamentary election held in 2006, he was elected from the Budapest Regional List of the Fidesz party. He was appointed member of the Committee on Health Affairs on May 30, 2006. During the 2006 local elections, he was elected a member of the General Assembly of Budapest.

Four years later, he defended his parliamentary mandate in the parliamentary election held in 2010. He was appointed Vice Chairman of the Committee on Health Affairs on May 14, 2010. After the local elections in October 2010, Mayor István Tarlós nominated him Deputy Mayor of Budapest for Health and Social Affairs. On January 1, 2011 Pesti became Director of the newly created Government Office of Budapest. As a result, due to incompatibility, he resigned from his deputy mayoral office and also replaced by Ildikó Bene as Deputy Chairman of the Committee on Health on February 14, 2011. Pesti functioned as Director until 2014, when he was elected Member of Parliament again. He was replaced as director by István György. He was a member of the Legislative Committee from 2014 to 2018 and Welfare Committee since 2018.
