= Anton Dreher =

19th-century Austrian brewer

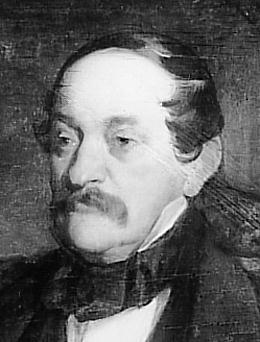
- King of Brewers
- Born: 7 May 1810; Klein Schwechat, Austrian Empire
- Died: 27 December 1863 (aged 53); Klein Schwechat, Austrian Empire
- Other names: "Beer King", "The English Brewmaster"
- Occupation: Brewer
- Known for: Developed Lager Beer
- Spouse(s): (i) Anna Wißgrill (1816-1841), (ii) Anna Hersfeld (1824-1884)
- Children: Anton Dreher Jr. (1849-1921)
- Parent(s): father: Franz Anton Dreher, 1736-1820, b Pfullendorf, (Swabia) mother: Katherine Widter, 1786-1864

Anton Dreher (7 May 1810 in Schwechat near Vienna – 27 December 1863 in Schwechat) was an Austrian brewer, business magnate, philanthropist of Danube Swabian ancestry, the founder of the Dreher Breweries who was an important figure in the development of pale lager.

In 1840, he introduced a beer that combined the crispness of lager with the paler hues of the English ale; this new style of beer became known as the Viennese style and was called Schwechater Lagerbier.

== Family of brewers ==
Franz Anton Dreher (1689–1743) was the Kronenwirt (innkeeper at the Crown Inn) in Pfullendorf, a small imperial city north of Überlingen (today Baden Württemberg, Germany).

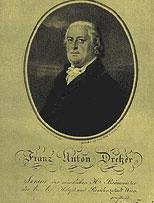
Franz Anton Dreher, 1736–1820, migrated to Vienna in search of his fortune, and he found it in Lager Beer.

His son, Franz Anton Dreher (a.k.a. "the younger", 1736–1820), studied brewing near Pfullendorf, but had larger dreams and made the Swabian migration of 1760 to Vienna. After several years of hand-to-mouth living, including a long stint as a waiter in a local beer hall, in 1780, Dreher leased a small brewery in Ober-Lanzendorf; in 1782, he leased another brewery, and acquired some fields. In 1796, he purchased, for 19,000 Thalers, a brewery in Klein Schwechat, outside of Vienna, with 46 acres (19 ha) and the Herberghaus (hostel). Dreher married (i) Maria Anna Huber, daughter of a surveyor, who had learned something of the brewing trade. The couple had no children, and when she died in 1803, he married (ii) Katherine Widter, 1786–1864, a miller's daughter from Speichmühle near Petersdorf. They had four children: Clara, 1806–1885, who married Franz Aich (1803–1870), also from a well known family of brewers in Tyrnau; a daughter who died circa 1808; another daughter; and Anton Dreher (the elder), born 1810, married (i), Anna Wigrill (1816–1841), the daughter of a shipmaster and land owner from Krems and, after the death of his first wife, (ii) Ann Hersfeld, 1824–1884, daughter of an administrator for the family of Thurn-Taxis, in Regensburg. From the second marriage, his son and heir, Anton (1849–1921) was born.

Anton Dreher (the younger) married Katherina, daughter of the master brewer Meichl of Simmering, to whom he had been apprenticed. They had 3 sons, Anton Eugen, Jenő, and Theodore. Theodore was a racing and auto enthusiast, and died in 1914.

Anton Eugen, the oldest son, inherited the Austrian concern in 1923, upon his father's death, but he himself died in 1925; his own son, Anton, had died in World War I, and his grandson, Oscar, died at the age of 10 years the following year. Anton Dreher also had an illegitimate son, the writer and editor Anton Breitner (March 18, 1858, in Vienna - May 30, 1928, in Mattsee).

Jenő Dreher, the youngest son of Anton Dreher, inherited the family's Hungarian concerns. Jenő's daughter, Elizabeth died at the age of 17 from tuberculosis; Lilly Haggenmacher mourned for her daughter until her own death.

== Education and career ==
When Franz Anton Dreher (the younger) died of marasmus in 1820, his ten-year-old son was too young to manage the brewing business. Dreher was apprenticed to the brewer Meichel, in Simmering and later undertook a study tour, a journeyman's tour, through Germany, where he studied at the Sedlmayr brewery in Munich, England, where he studied at Barclay and Perkins in London, and Scotland.

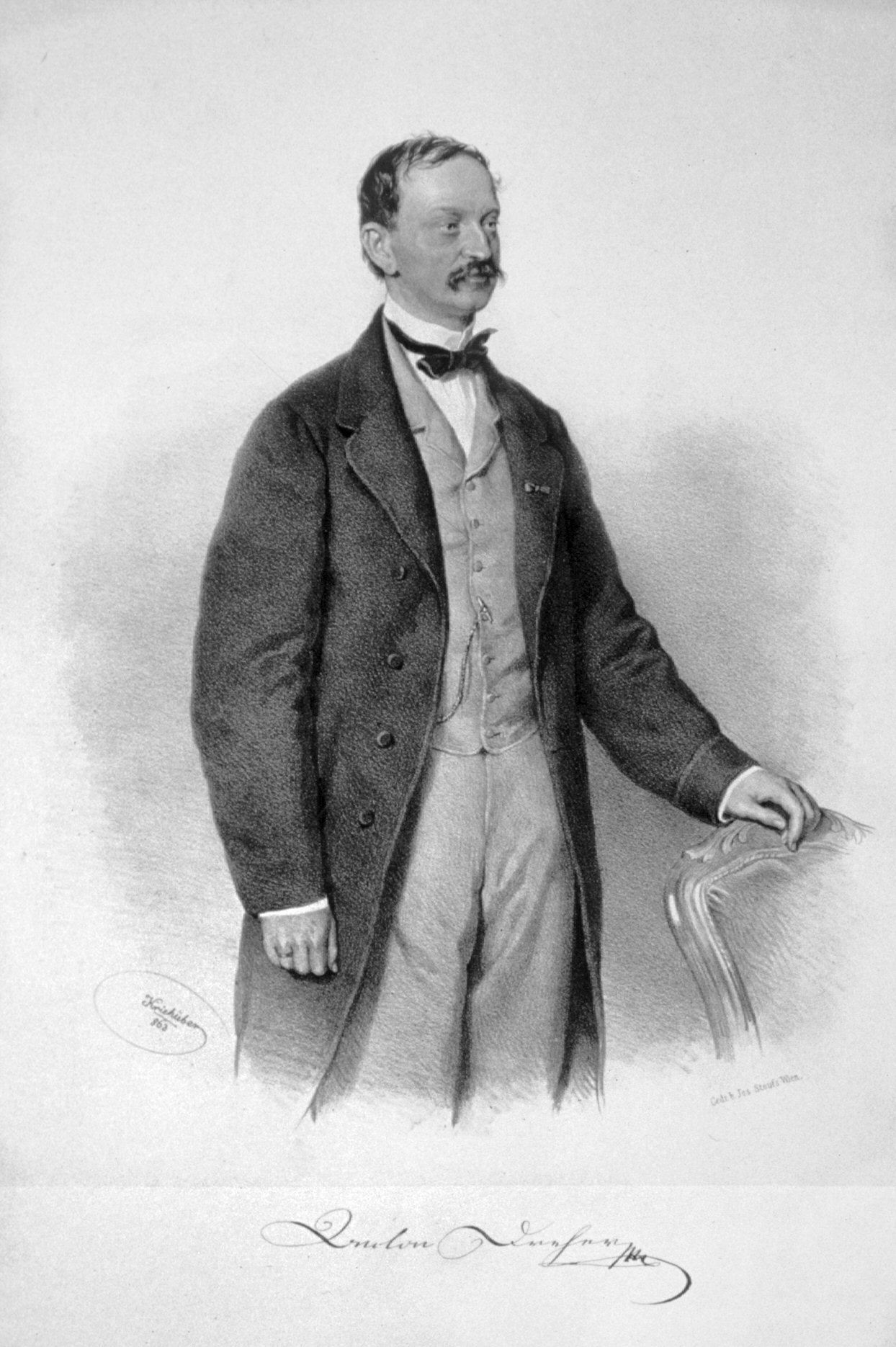
Anton Dreher

On April 1, 1836, he started renting his mother's brewery and started to make pale malt using the English malting process he had learned about a few years before which he used to brew top-fermented "Kaiserbier". Using bottom-fermenting yeast he had received from his friend Gabriel Sedlmayr's Spaten brewery, he started brewing bottom-fermented beer during the winter, but lacking any cellars on his own, the beer had to be matured in the pub cellars. During the summer, he had to go back to brewing top-fermented beers. On May 27, 1839, he was able to buy the brewery outright from his mother for 24,000 Gulden.

In 1841, instead of entrusting the correct storage and maturation of his beer to pub owners, he instead stored the beer under cold conditions by himself, using the cellars of the pub "zur Kohlkreunze" in Vienna's suburb Fünfhaus, his own house's cellars and a cellar that he rented from his a neighbor. In 1842 and 1843, he started building extensive cellars next to his brewery. This allowed him to drastically expand his brewing business, eventually culminating in the purchase of two breweries in Michelob and Kőbánya to better serve the Bohemian and Hungarian markets.

He owned acres of land throughout Austria and Bohemia, and grew his own hops (at his brewing estate in Michelob) and barley, which allowed him to protect the business from the volatility of the hop and grain market at least to a certain extent. When he died suddenly on December 26, 1863, his fortune was estimated at 8 to 10 million Gulden.

== Development of pale lager ==
Starting in 1836, Anton Dreher took over the brewery and developed the bottom-fermented beer — Schwechater Lagerbier — which he presented in 1840/1841. It was a new style of beer, methodically bottom fermented to produce a brew that was coppery reddish-brown in color. It required steady, cool temperature for maturation and storage, and this requirement gives the beer its name: lager (in German, Lager means storehouse or warehouse). Originally, he called the beer Märzen, or March beer. Although situated in Austria, Anton Dreher strictly kept to Bavarian brewing methods in his brewery and therefore only brewed beer in the winter months between October and April when natural temperatures allowed cool fermentation and the collection of ice for the lagering cellar. In this tradition, Märzen was the last beer brewed in a brewing season, sometimes to a greater strength.

In 1858, Dreher's Lager won the gold medal for excellence at the Beer Exhibit in Vienna. On 26 November 1861, Emperor Franz Joseph I honoured Anton Dreher's work by visiting his brewery. At the International Exhibition in London 1862, Dreher presented four types of beer for which he received a bronze medal. In recognition of this success, Anton Dreher was made a Knight of the Imperial Austrian Order of Franz Joseph by the Emperor.

The Danube river provided the water needed for unlimited beer and malt making. The attention turned to Kőbánya because of a beer made by Peter Schmidt, a brewer master from Pest who studied in Munich. Schmidt stored beer in his rock cellar in Kőbánya. The water in the wells, made by deep drilling technology, is perfectly suited for beer making; the cellars of Schmidt's brewery provided the steady cool temperature needed for maturation and storage. It was the ideal warehouse, or, in German Lager, for storing the beer.

The surge of the Kőbánya beer production attracted Dreher's attention, in part because Schmidt's beer was competition for him. He visited Pest-Buda on several occasions between 1856 and 1860; by 1862 he was able to buy the Kőbánya Brewery Company. He purchased further plots of land and prepared for expansion, but died suddenly in 1863, leaving his 14-year-old son to implement the plans.

== The brewery under the son's leadership ==
After his father's death in 1863, Anton Dreher continued the work on the brewing process. He started to export this beer first to the Netherlands, then to Triest (now Trieste), where it was known as Birra Dreher, and then to Germany. In 1871, known as the winter without ice, Dreher constructed a cooling machine to process the beer. He continued to develop the brewery, the mechanization, and the fields, and by 1897 the brewery was producing 739.639 Hectoliters of beer, which was more than double the amount produced under his father in the company's most productive year.

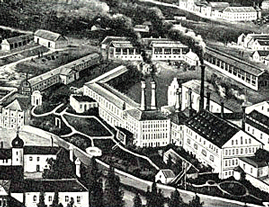
By 1900, Schwechat Brewery was the largest brewery in Europe

The following year, the brewery produced 1.25 million Hectoliters, making it the most productive brewery in the world. By 1913, the brewery in Schwechat was united with brewery in Simmering, and the brewery in another suburb of Vienna, St. Marx, and known as The United Breweries of Schwechat, Simmering, and St. Marx: Dreher, Mautner, Meichle Incorporated. Production declined shrank during World War I, when over half of its employees were needed for military service. The Brewery facility in Schwechat was converted to a hospital, and the other breweries produced Kriegsbier (war beer), for distribution to the troops.

=== Awards ===
In 1867, Dreher's Kleinschwechater brewery presented its beers at the 1867 International Exposition in Paris. It built a restaurant in the park of the Expo's Austrian section which included two ice cellars to store the beer under optimal conditions. Using custom-built ice wagons that ensured a constant temperature of 4 °C, the brewery could transport 54 hectolitres of beer from Klein-Schwechat to Paris, a journey that took 5 days. The brewery was awarded a gold medal for the beers presented.

Anton Dreher Jr. was awarded an Honorary Diploma for his beers presented at the 1873 Vienna World's Fair. In 1878, he again won gold in Paris, 1879, again in Sydney, 1878, in Melbourne, and 1882, in Trieste. On 30 October 1873, Anton Dreher Jr. was made a Knight of the Imperial Austrian Order of Franz Joseph.

In 1897, Dreher was promoted to a Knight Commander of the Imperial Austrian Order of Franz Joseph. In 1902, he became a member of the Austrian House of Lords and was made a Knight Second Class of the Order of the Iron Crown.

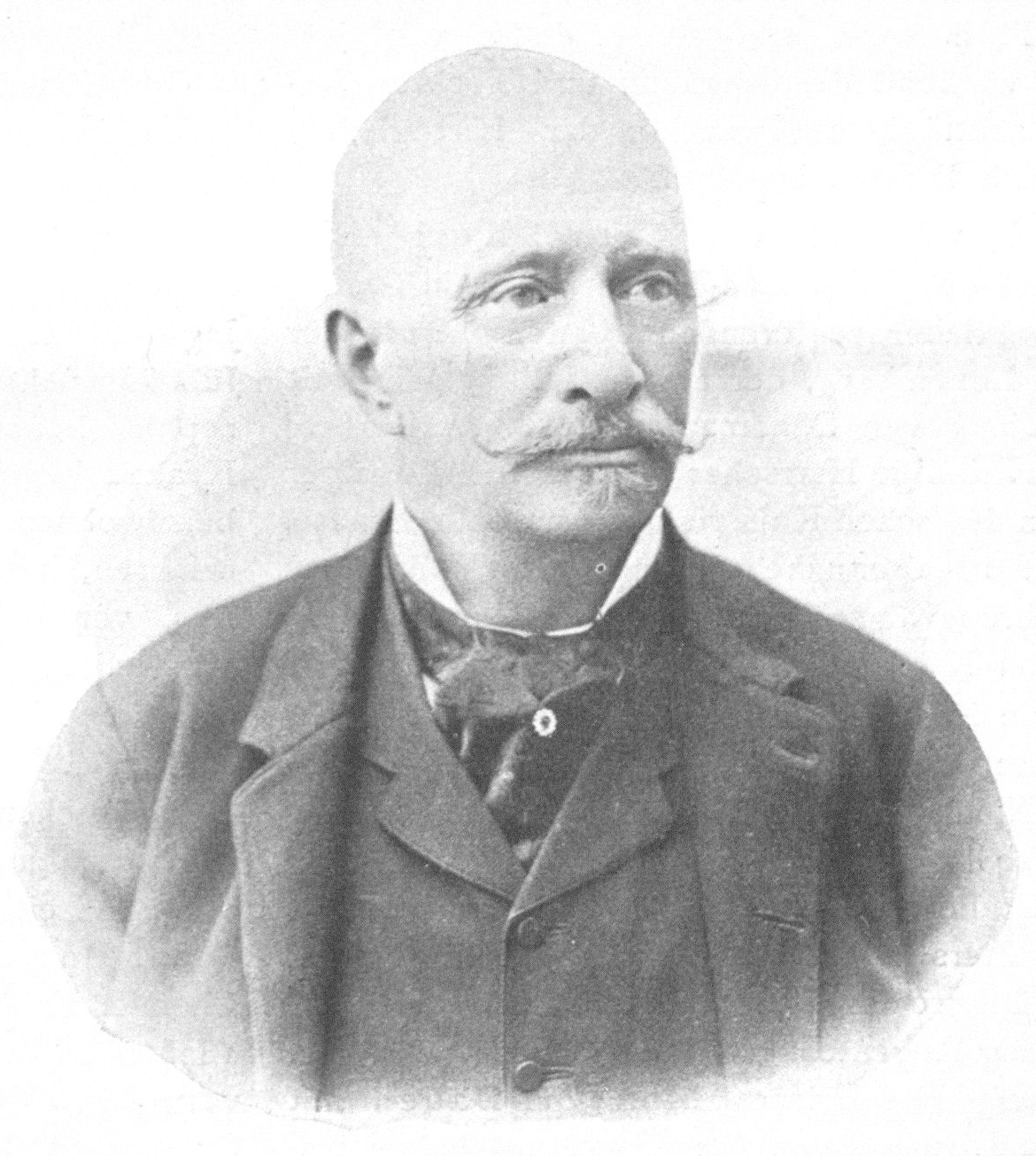
Anton Dreher Jr., ca. 1900

=== Brauhaus Dreher ===
The Dreher Brewery and Tavern played an important role in the Social Democrat movement of Vienna following World War I, also known as Red Vienna. In the middle of the 19th century, Anton Dreher senior had purchased two small, adjacent restaurants and combined them into one Gasthaus with a big garden. Drehers Etablissement opened on 25 December 1859 and was an immediate hit as a hot Beer Hall. It had not only the garden and the tavern, but also a restaurant and a dance hall. Between 1918 and 1933, it became the unofficial meeting place of Landstrasser Social Democrats of Vienna.

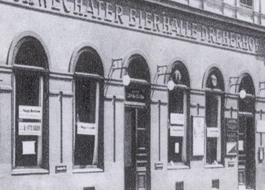
The Dreher Etablissement, opened 1859.

== Expansion to Hungary ==
Among his three sons, Anton Dreher Jr. entrusted Jenő with the management of the Kőbánya brewery, which became a corporation in 1907 under the name "Dreher Antal Kőbányai Serfőzdéje," and was a market leader until World War I. The Dreher family business became a corporation in 1905 and the Hungarian company became independent of the mother company in 1907. Jenő Dreher continued to buy shares of his competitors, Haggenmacher Kőbánya and Budafoki Rt., Barber and Klusemann Brewery and the First Hungarian Brewery Corporation (founded in 1867).

When Anton Dreher died in 1921, his oldest son, Anton Eugen (b. 1871) took over the brewery business, but he died in 1925. The 12-year-old Oskar died in 1926, and with him the line of brewers. The Dreher Combine, which was merged from these two companies in 1923, also bought up the Royal Brewery Corporation of Kanizsa in 1928. As the result of the grand scale expansion, Dreher-Haggenmacher First Hungarian Brewery Corporation was launched in 1933, and acquired 70 percent of the market.

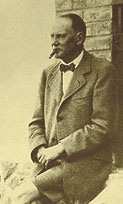
Jenő Dreher at the horse races. He was a rider before he took over his father's business in Hungary.

The two other Kőbánya Breweries - Polgár and the Municipal Brewery – were left with only a quarter stake of the market. Dreher beer was exported to North and South America, western Europe, Asia, Africa, and Australia, where ever Germans, Austrians and Hungarians migrated, and became a worldwide brand name. After the death of his elder brother and his great nephew, Jenő Dreher sold off the Austrian portion of the family business.

== The Brewery after the Drehers ==
After the deaths of the Drehers, the Austrian side of the business was transformed into a consortium; the family Mautner-Markhof, which had been associated with the Drehers since the development of the crystallized malt, assumed direction of the consortium. In 1945, the main brewery was destroyed in World War II, and for the first time in over a century, no beer was produced by the company; eight months later, the brewery reopened, and production began again. Twenty years later, it joined with the Austrian Brewery, AG, and the Steirer brewery AG, to create the Brewery Union of Austria, AG.

On the Hungarian side, the Dreher family fortune and business was nationalized by the new communist state; the Drehers left Hungary. In 1992, Kőbányai Sörgyár was converted into a shareholding company; in 1993, it became a member of the South African Breweries (SAB). In 1997, the company acquired rights to the name Dreher, and became Dreher Sörgyárak Ltd (Dreher Breweries). The brewery exists today, and still produces Lager.

In 2002, the South African Breweries merged with the Miller Brewing Company to create the SABMiller group, which is the second largest brewing company of the world, with brewing interests or distribution agreements in over 60 countries across six continents. SABMiller PLC is listed in the London stock exchange and the Johannesburg stock exchange, and its international brand portfolio includes such historical brands as Pilsner Urquell, Peroni Nastro Azzurro, Miller Genuine Draft, and Castle Lager.

In 2017, Dreher Breweries were sold by SABMiller PLC to Asahi Breweries.

== Literature ==
- Article "Dreher, Anton" in: Allgemeine Deutsche Biographie, herausgegeben von der Historischen Kommission bei der Bayrischen Akademie der Wissenschaften, Band 5 (1877), ab Seite 391.Wikisourc.
- Allerlei. Österreich. Die österreichische Linie der Familie Dreher ausgestorben. Badener Zeitung, 3. März 1926
- Dreher Family history, Accessed 30 July 2009
- History of Schwechater Beer, p. 1. Accessed 29 July 2009 (in German)
- Lees, Graham, “All About Beer,” excerpted in Beer Barons Beer Styles.
- Josef Promintzer; Gustav Otruba (1959). "Dreher, Anton". Neue Deutsche Biographie (in German). Vol. 4. Berlin: Duncker & Humblot. pp. 107–108.
- Red Vienna, WebLexicon of Viennese Social Democracy Online, Accessed 30 July 2009
