= Leopold Hirschfeld =

Hungarian brewer

- Lipót Hirschfeld
- Born: 1798; Bonyhád, Hungary, Habsburg Empire
- Died: 1893 (aged 94–95); Pécs, Hungary, Austria-Hungary
- Occupations: trader brewer
- Board member of: CEO Pécsi Sörfőzde
- Children: Sámuel

Leopold Hirschfeld (Hungarian: Lipót Hirschfeld; 1798–1893) was Hungarian Jewish brewer in Pécs, Hungary, Habsburg Empire. In 1848, he founded Pécsi Sörfőzde.

== Life ==
Leopold Hirschfeld was born in Bonyhád, Hungary where he was dealing with grain trade and later learnt brewering. In the 1840s he moved to Pécs, Baranya with the aim to set up there his own brewery. At that time there were several breweries in Baranya. They worked in guilds with the permission of the responsible city council, but could produce just in little amounts despite a growing demand.

Leopold bought the small brewery of the hospital of Pécs in 1848 and transformed it into a big beer manufacture during the 1850s. It became the first brewery in the whole region which successfully implemented the greatest technical achievements of this time, especially the use of produced ice. The factory's young and ambitious chemist Emanuel Kristian Scharbach developed that new brewering technology which brought the company great success.

The first official recognition came on the 40th anniversary of the Hungarian Revolution of 1848 General Exhibition of Pécs (Pécsi Általános Kiállítás) where the company was awarded with a golden prize for its beer. After this period came temporary stagnation, because beers from Vienna, Pest and Graz became more popular in the region. For the popularization of the local beers in the 1870s Zsolnay introduced its own beer mugs which helped the local brewering companies for a short time.

Then in 1887 an epidemic of phylloxera appeared on the vineyards in the Mecsek Mountains. Until 1889 most of the vineyards of the historical wine region were destroyed. This was a tragic incident which changed the consumption habits of the residents. People started to drink more beer and less wine, which boosted the beer production and consumption in the region.

As long as the two big breweries of Pécs, the one of Scholz produced annually 5000 hectoliters and the one of Hirschfeld made 4000 hectoliters; by 1891 the production jumped up to 15 000 hectoliters together. The factory exported beer to its main export markets, to Slavonia, Croatia, Bosnia and Fiume. But it was not enough so new, third big brewery appeared on the market in 1893, the Agricultural Brewery & Steammill Co. (Mezőgazdasági Sörgyár és Gőzmalom RT.) whose owner was the son of Gyula Scholtz, the owner of the Scholtz Brewery who started his own business.

Leopold saw the advantages of the strong rivals, so he established a high-quality beer garden of German and Austrian examples for his beer products. He called it Abbázia, and it had a covered and an open-air part where thousands of people could spend their spare time drinking and talking. The locals loved the beer garden because it offered them a metropolitan feeling and there was enough space for revelry and charity ceremonies.

== Personal life ==
His son, Sámuel Hirschfeld was born in 1844/1843 in Bonyhád.

== Death ==
Leopold Hirschfelder died in 1893 in Pécs.

== Legacy ==
His son, Sámuel Hirschfeld inherited the brewery who renamed it as Pannonia Brewery (Pannónia Sörfőzde) and improved its beers with clearer water from deeper wells. After the Great Depression it became the only functioning brewery of Pécs.
