= István György =

Hungarian jurist and politician

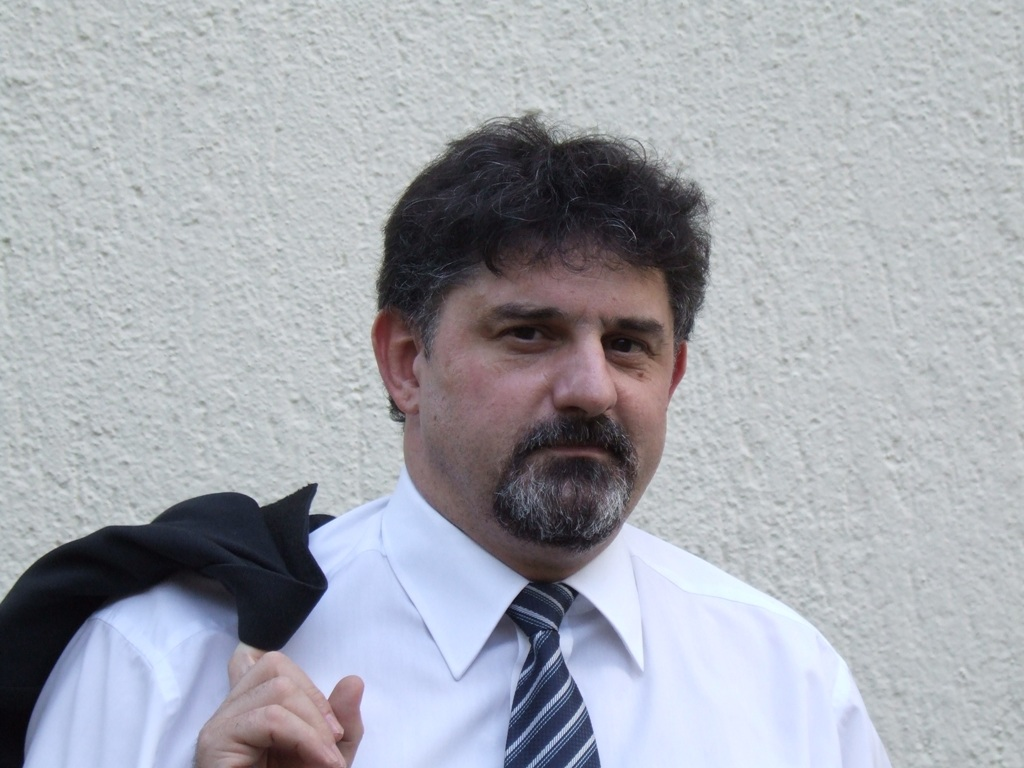

Member of the National Assembly
- In office 14 May 2010 – 5 May 2014

Mayor of Kőbánya District X, Budapest
- In office 1990 – 20 October 2002
- Succeeded by: Sándor Andó

Personal details
- Born: 31 October 1959 (age 66) Budapest, Hungary
- Party: Fidesz
- Spouse: Ildikó Egressy
- Children: Bence; Sára; Réka
- Profession: jurist, politician

Dr. István György (born October 31, 1959) is a Hungarian jurist and politician, who served as Mayor of Kőbánya (10th district of Budapest) between 1990 and 2002. He was Deputy Mayor of Budapest responsible for the urban management from 2010 to 2014. György was appointed Director of the Budapest Government Office on July 1, 2014, replacing Imre Pesti. He served in this capacity until January 2020, when he was appointed Secretary of State for Public Services. He was replaced as director by fellow Fidesz politician Botond Sára.

György also represented Kőbánya (Budapest Constituency XIV) in the National Assembly of Hungary between 2010 and 2014. He was a member of the Constitutional, Judicial and Standing Orders Committee from May 14, 2010 to November 2, 2010. After that he worked in the Economic and Information Technology Committee.
