= Gergely Arató =

Hungarian politician

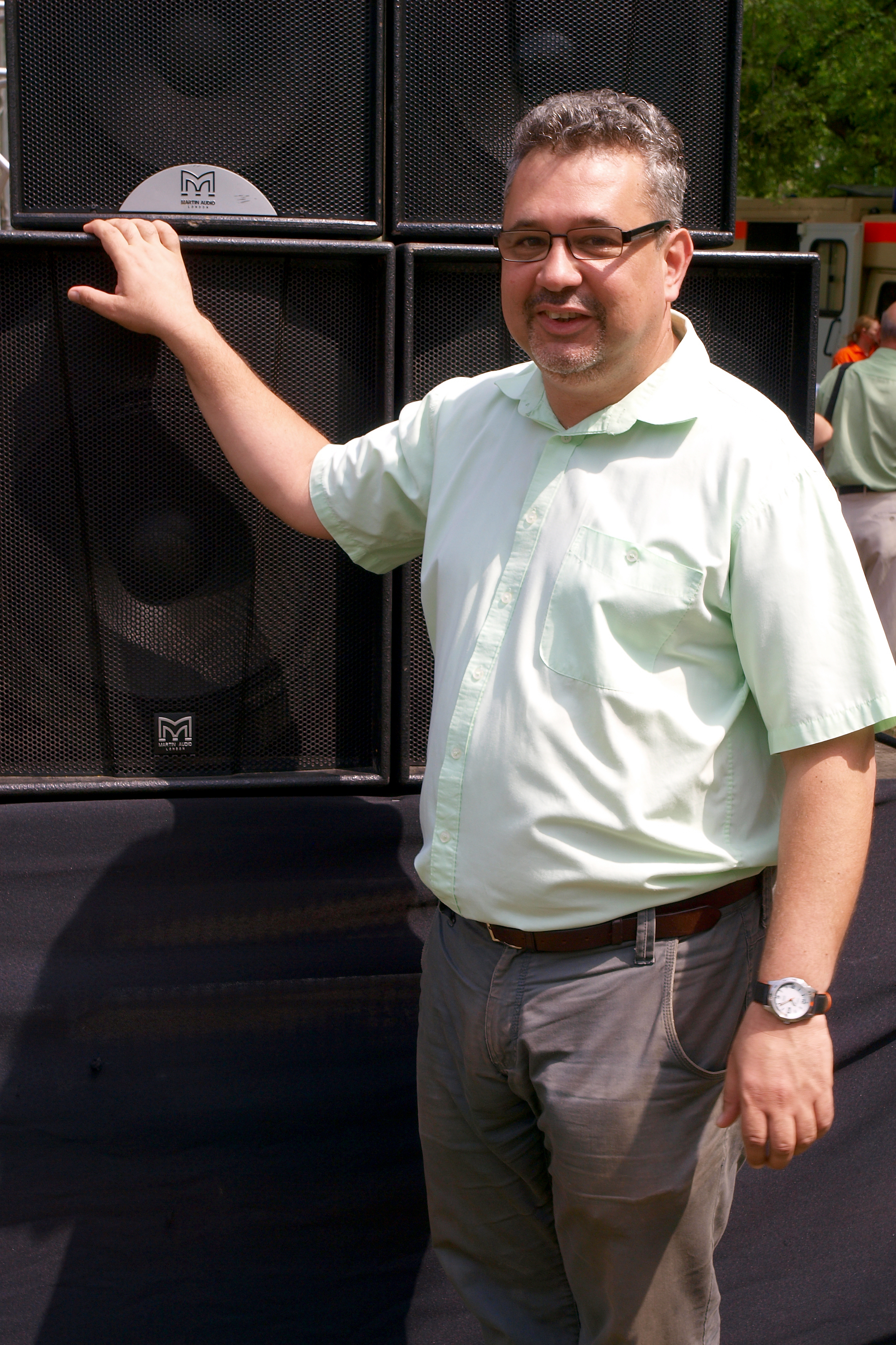

Member of the Hungarian National Assembly
- In office 8 May 2018 – 8 May 2026

Personal details
- Born: 23 November 1968 (age 57) Budapest, Hungary
- Party: Democratic Coalition (Hungary)

Gergely László Arató (born in Budapest, Hungary on 23 November 1968) is a Hungarian politician. He was a member of the Hungarian National Assembly between 2018 and 2026.

== Early life and career ==
He graduated from the Eötvös József High School in Budapest in 1987. After his high school education he enrolled into the Eötvös Loránd University where he studied in the Faculty of Science and graduated with a degree in chemistry and physics in 1993. He later enrolled into the University of Pécs and graduated in 2000 with a degree in political science. Between 1998 and 2002, he was an elected municipal councilor in Kőbánya in charge of Public Security, Crime Prevention and Order Committee, member of the Education Committee.

In 2000, he joined the Hungarian Socialist Party. In the 2002 Hungarian parliamentary election, his party entered the National Assembly of Hungary. From 2002 to 2004, he was a member of the Committee on Education and Science, Sports and Youth Committee, and the head of the youth and sports working group of the National Assembly. In 2004, he became deputy leader of the Hungarian Socialist Party.

Between 2004 and 2006, he was the State Secretary at the Ministry of Education. In 2006, he won his seat in the first round in the 14th constituency of Budapest. From 2006 to 2010, he was Secretary of State in the Ministry of Education and Culture. He entered the parliament through the Democratic Coalition (Hungary) in 2018.

In the 2021 Hungarian opposition primary, he ran as a candidate in the Budapest 9th constituency of Democratic Coalition (Hungary) and won his constituency. He is also the deputy parliamentary leader of the Democratic Coalition.

In the 2026 Hungarian parliamentary election, he ran as an individual candidate in the Budapest 7th constituency of Democratic Coalition (Hungary). However, he only gained 2.11% of the votes.

== See also ==
- List of members of the National Assembly of Hungary (2018–2022)
