= Kőbánya =

10th District of Budapest Budapest X. kerülete Kőbánya
- District of Budapest
- District X
- Flag Coat of arms

- Location of District X in Budapest (shown in grey)
- Coordinates: 47°28′35″N 19°8′35″E
- Country: Hungary
- Region: Central Hungary
- City: Budapest
- Established: 17 November 1873
- Quarters: List: Felsőrákos; Gyárdűlő; Keresztúridűlő; Kőbánya-Kertváros; Kúttó; Laposdűlő; Ligettelek; Népliget; Óhegy; Téglagyárdűlő; Újhegy

Government
  - Mayor: Róbert Kovács (Fidesz-KDNP)

Area
  - Total: 32.49 km^{2} (12.54 sq mi)
  - Rank: 9th

Population (2016)
  - Total: 78,414
  - Rank: 10th
  - Density: 2,413/km^{2} (6,251/sq mi)
- Demonym: tizedik kerületi (“10th districter”)
- Time zone: UTC+1 (CET)
  - Summer (DST): UTC+2 (CEST)
- Postal code: 1101 ... 1108
- Website: www.kobanya.hu

Kőbánya (Hungarian pronunciation: [ˈkøːbaːɲɒ], German: Steinbruch, lit. 'Quarry') is the 10th district of Budapest (Hungarian: Budapest X. kerülete) and one of the largest by territory. It is located in southeast Pest, easily accessible from the downtown by Metro 3, whose terminus is named Kőbánya-Kispest.

It has strong industrial and organized labour traditions; as such, it suffered a decline after the collapse of the Hungarian People's Republic in 1989–90. Today, the district is rebuilding itself into a living area for the middle class. Due to its large size, there are several diverse areas within Kőbánya, each with different architecture.

== History ==
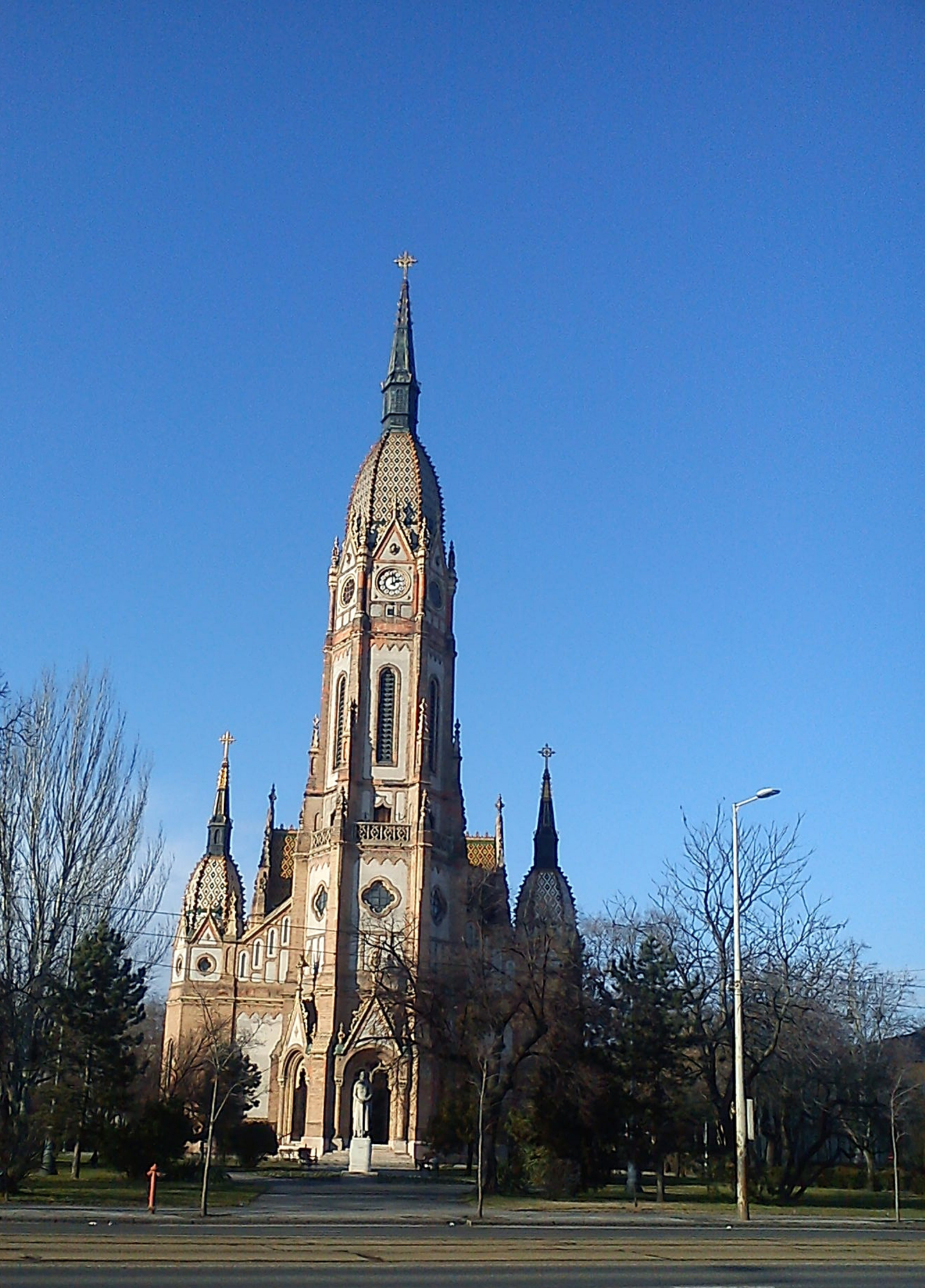
Szent László-templom, Kőbánya

The Kőbánya area was historically used to mine limestone for buildings in Buda and north-west Hungary. The extensive and often un-plotted tunnel network that was created during the past five centuries is a major source of problems today, causing buildings to sink and roadbeds collapse. There were also clay-mining pits for the brick industry. Most of these holes have been filled with urban garbage during the 20th century, then covered with soil and built upon, which also causes problems today. As an exception, one of the holes became a fishing lake due to collapse.

A third of the economy in Kőbánya was in wine-making, until the vineyards were destroyed by the Phylloxera disease at the end of the 19th century. A building which exemplifies the historical heritage of Kőbánya is the "Csősztorony" (a small vineyard watchtower) in the middle of the Óhegy area. The district recovered when beer-making enterprises moved into the area and the light beer "Kőbányai Világos" became a kind of national drink during the socialist regime.

The historical Rákosmező area, whose exact location is no longer known, used to be the only legal tent site for feudal parliamentary sessions throughout the medieval ages. It is only known that it was alongside the small Rákos stream, which runs into the Danube river.

The barren new Rákosmező area (now a traffic junction near the brewery) used to be the proving ground for Hungarian aviation pioneers around 1909–1912. Even Louis Bleriot flew there once during an air race.

== Geography ==
Kőbánya lies mostly on plain. Óhegy and Újhegy (literally Old- and Newhill) are two higher-standing areas, roughly at the height of Gellért Hill on the other side of the Danube river. Óhegy is 148 m high.

== Demographics ==
Kőbánya is a largely working to middle class, mostly ethnically Hungarian neighborhood (90,3%). There is a significant Roma (Gypsy) presence in the district (1%), mostly scattered evenly over the entire district. As of recent, a number of small but visible immigrant communities are also springing up, notably the Chinese (0,6%). (2001 census)

== Economy ==
Kőbánya is home to pharmaceutical companies Egis Pharmaceuticals PLC Ltd. and Gedeon Richter Ltd., and the sizeable beer brewer Dreher. Manufacturing and the chemical industry collapsed with the fall of socialism. Tax evasion still occurs frequently in the district, which hurts the district and the country.

== Description ==
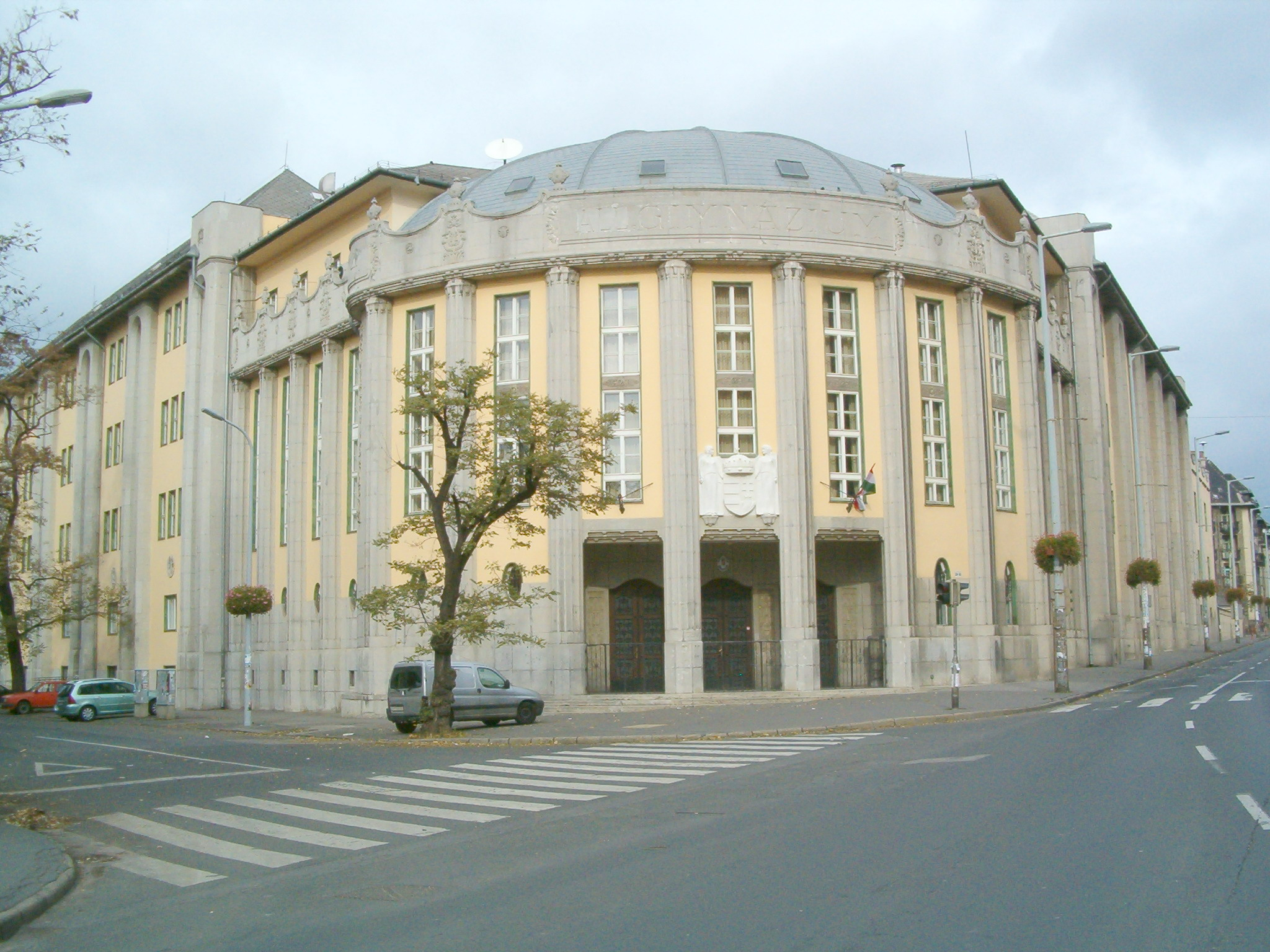
The famous Szent László Gimnázium

The centre of Kőbánya has a beautiful Catholic church built 1891–97 in eclectic-Art Nouveau style, dedicated to knight-king St. Ladislaus. It was designed by Ödön Lechner and a statue of the architect with a model of the church has been erected outside. The church has a very tall bell-tower and the church's roof is covered in patented colorful Zsolnay "eozenic" porcelain tiles which were designed by Ignatz Oppenheimer. Next to it lies the "Pataky" culture centre and library, and Szent László Gimnázium, the secondary school, also dedicated to King Ladislaus. It specializes in biology and languages (especially Italian). Many elementary schools in Kőbánya have been closed in recent years due to dwindling birthrate. On the opposite side of the church the "Mázsa tér" square is set to become a small high-rise are with six 60-meter tall apartment towers. The Budapest general assembly or the Ferihegy airport authorities are considering blocking this ambitious plan.

Újhegy have been covered with a vast housing estate of 10-story concrete houses during the 1970s and 1980s. A very large area of Kőbánya land near Újhegy is occupied by a prison and the New Public Cemetery (perhaps the largest in Europe). Other large open spaces, namely the horse-racing circuit and the Expo area (used for international trade fairs during the communist era) will be relocated outside the district to allow for housing projects.

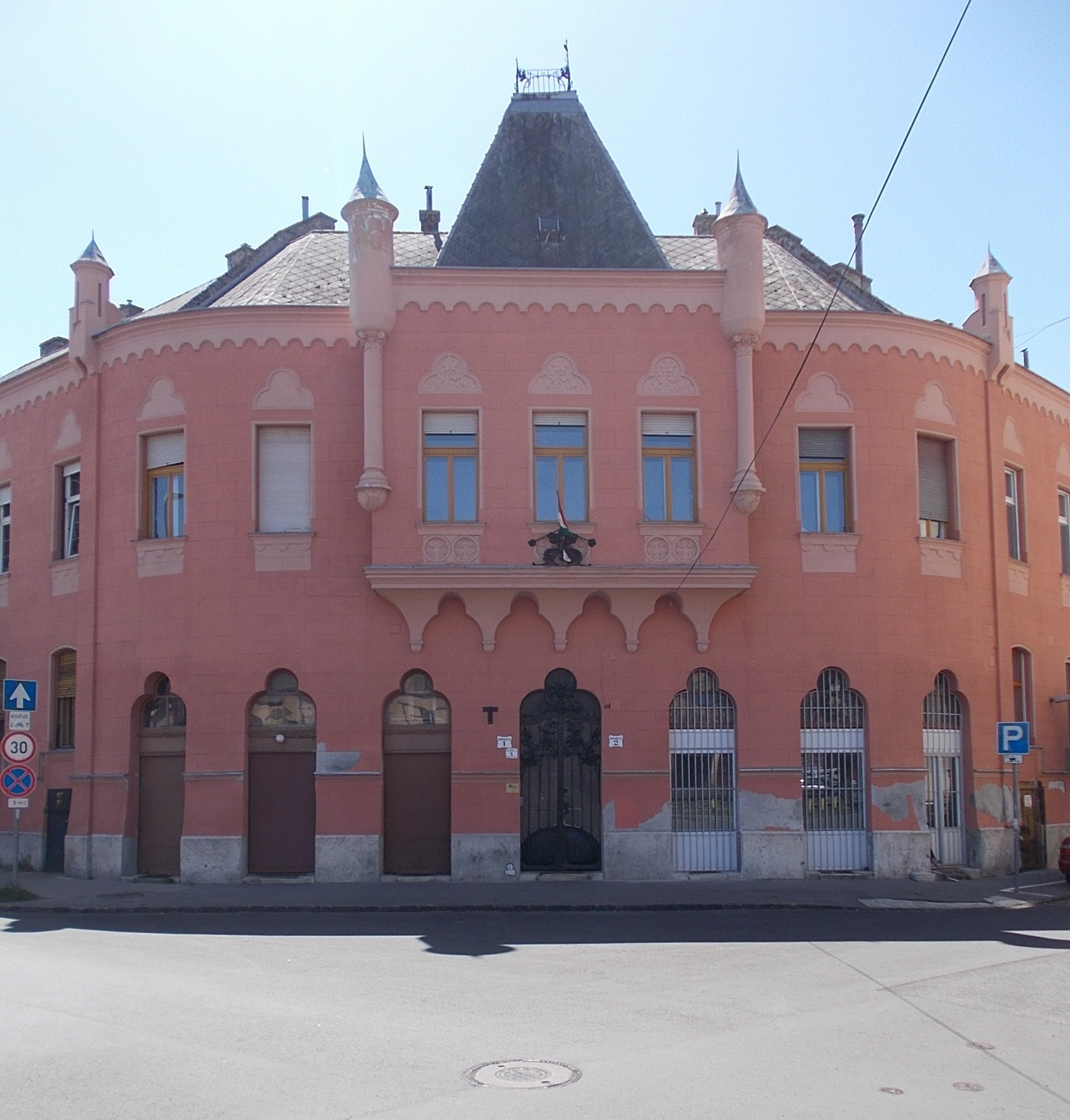
Gergely utca 1

In the north-east corner of the 10th district is a large fashionable shopping mall called Árkád on the Örs vezér tere traffic junction. In the south-east corner is a public sporting park (Sportliget) with indoor swimming pool and a small but very deep fishing lake. In the north-west corner is a large public park called Népliget, which has been in poor shape since 1990, due to social outcasts drawn there by the intercity bus junction. A large Planetarium is located in the park. The south-west corner of Kőbánya hosts the terminal station of the M3 underground line and a large mass transit junction. This area is inhabited by many homeless people.

== Politics ==
Kőbánya has had a socialist party-dominated municipal assembly since 1990. Before 2002 the mayor was a member of the Christian Republic party. At that time a socialist bureaucrat became mayor. The inefficient and in-fighting Kőbánya council has become a symbol of corruption and feud, both too common to Hungarian politics. Kőbánya recently has been drawn into a financial and political scandal, domestically known as the "broker scandal" and lost huge investments, pushing the district into great debts. After much political manipulation, some of this sum was recovered, when the affected bank decided to pay to keep the even nastier issues under wrap.

The current mayor of X. District of Budapest is Róbert Kovács (Fidesz-KDNP).

The District Assembly, elected at the 2019 local government elections, is made up of 18 members (1 Mayor, 12 Individual constituencies MEPs and 5 Compensation List MEPs) divided into this political parties and alliances:

Party	Seats	Current District Assembly
Fidesz-KDNP	9	M
Opposition coalition (Note: Coalition of Momentum–DK–MSZP–Dialogue.)	8	
Politics Can Be Different	1	

=== List of mayors ===
Member	Party	Date
István György	Fidesz	1990–2002
Sándor Andó	MSZP	2002–2006
Lajos Verbai	MSZP	2006–2010
Róbert Kovács	Fidesz	2010–

== Sport ==
- Kőbányai Barátság
- Kőbányai Dózsa SE
- Kőbányai Lombik TK
- Törekvés SE
- Kőbányai Textil SC

== Twin towns – sister cities ==
Kőbánya is twinned with:

- Bălan, Romania
- Jarosław, Poland
- Letovice, Czech Republic
- Litochoro, Greece
- Štúrovo, Slovakia
- Vinkovci, Croatia
- Haidian, China
- Wolverhampton, England, United Kingdom
- Kula, Serbia

== See also ==
- Kőbánya cellar system
- List of districts in Budapest

== Gallery ==
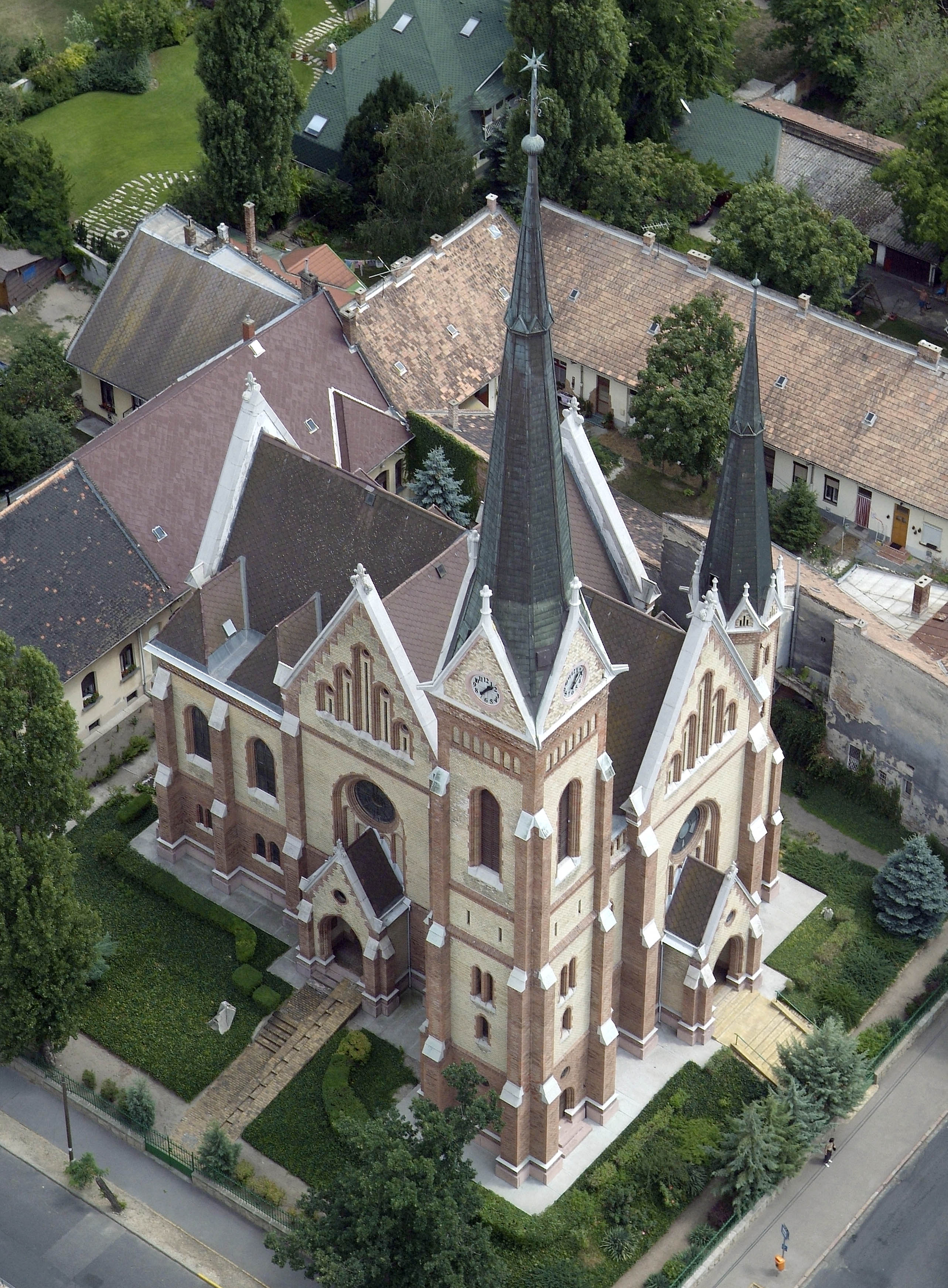

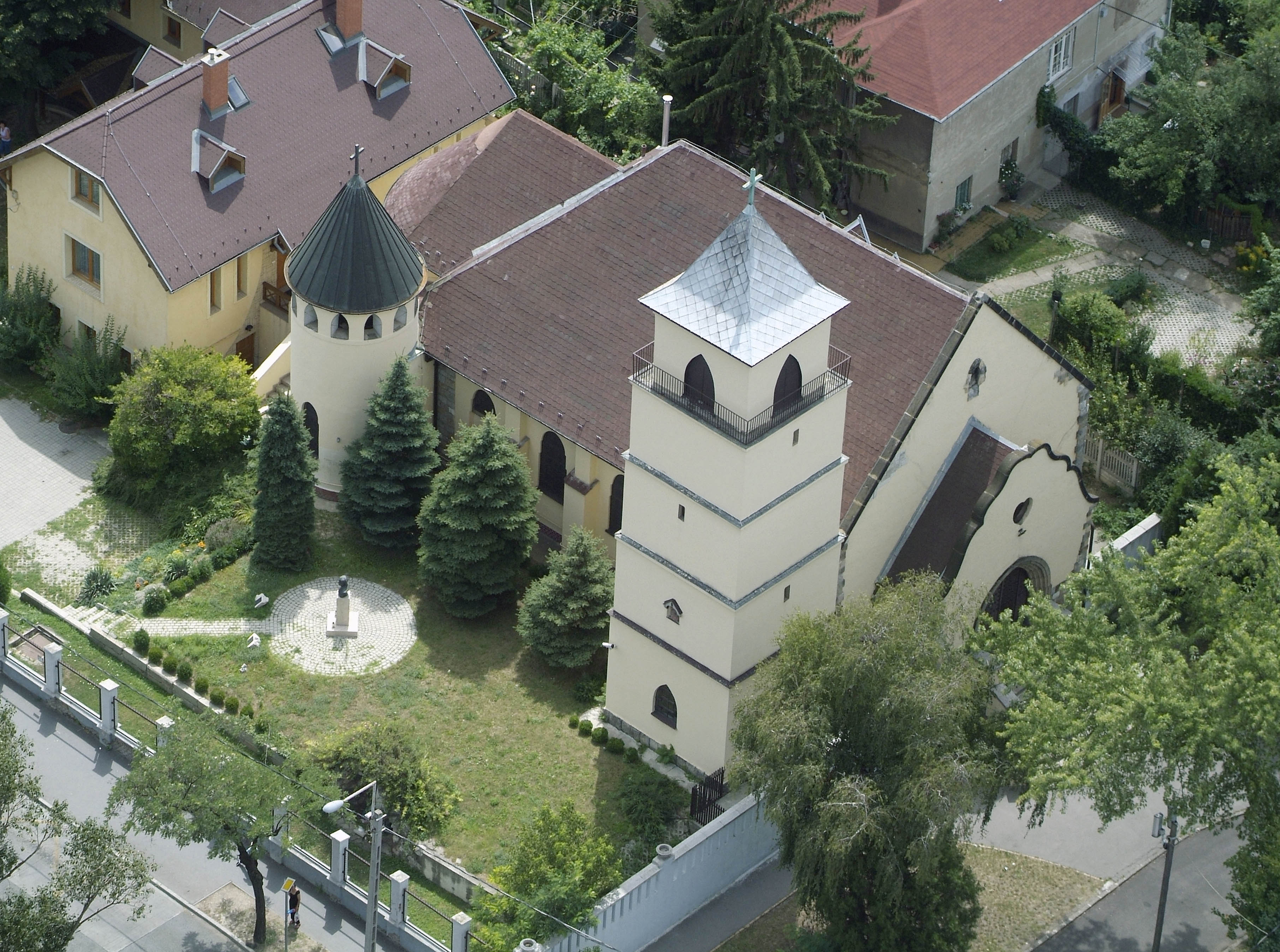

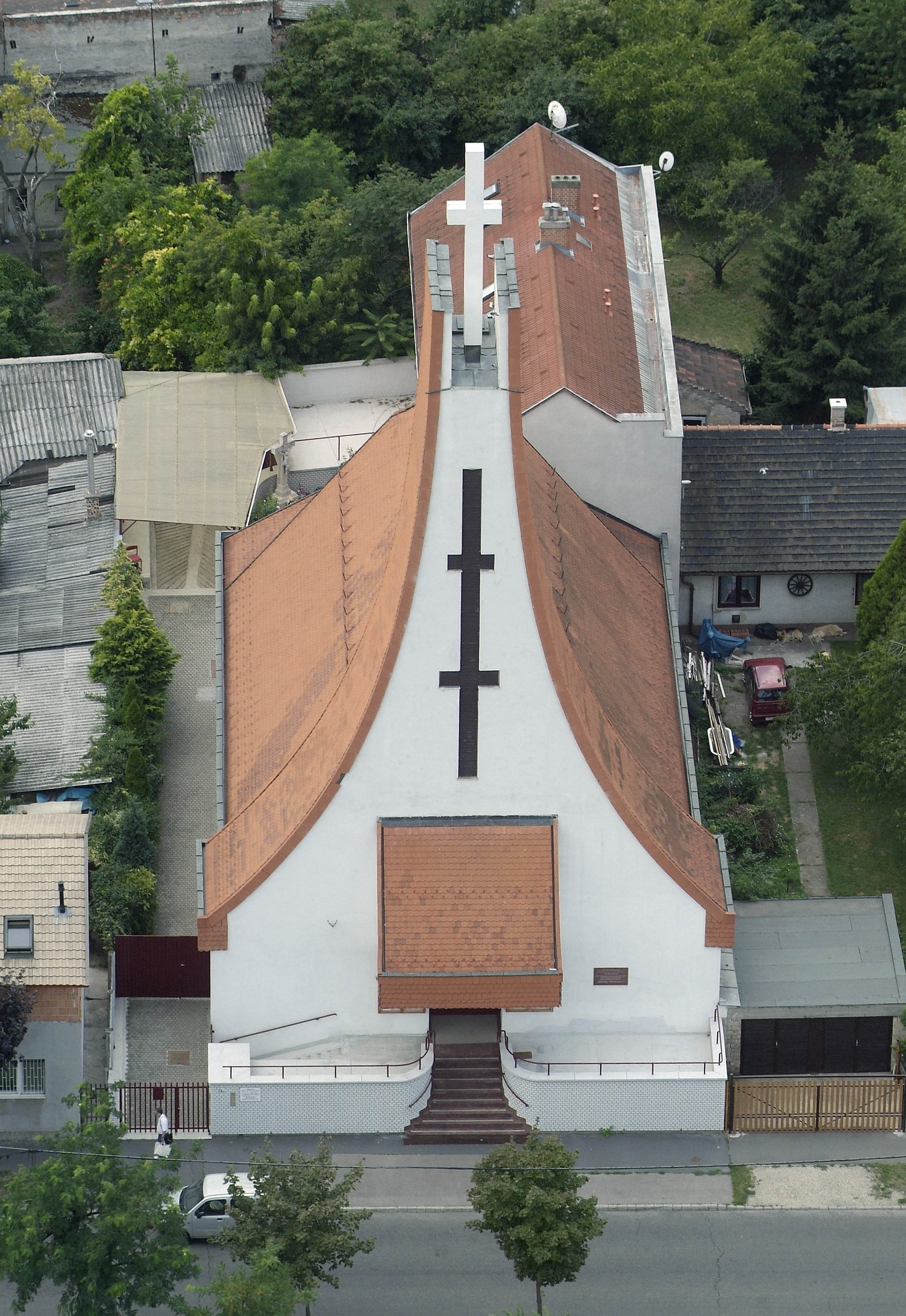

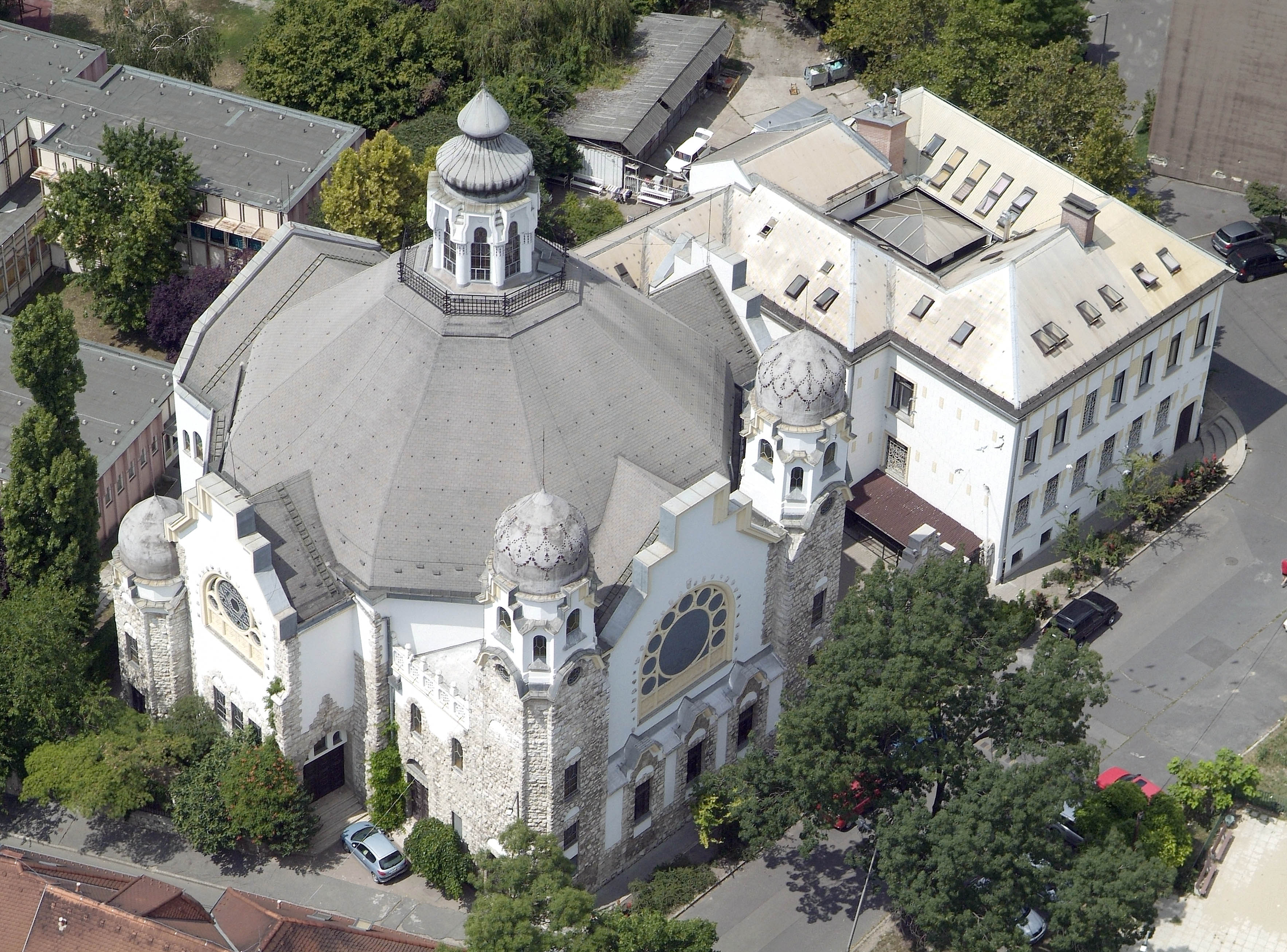

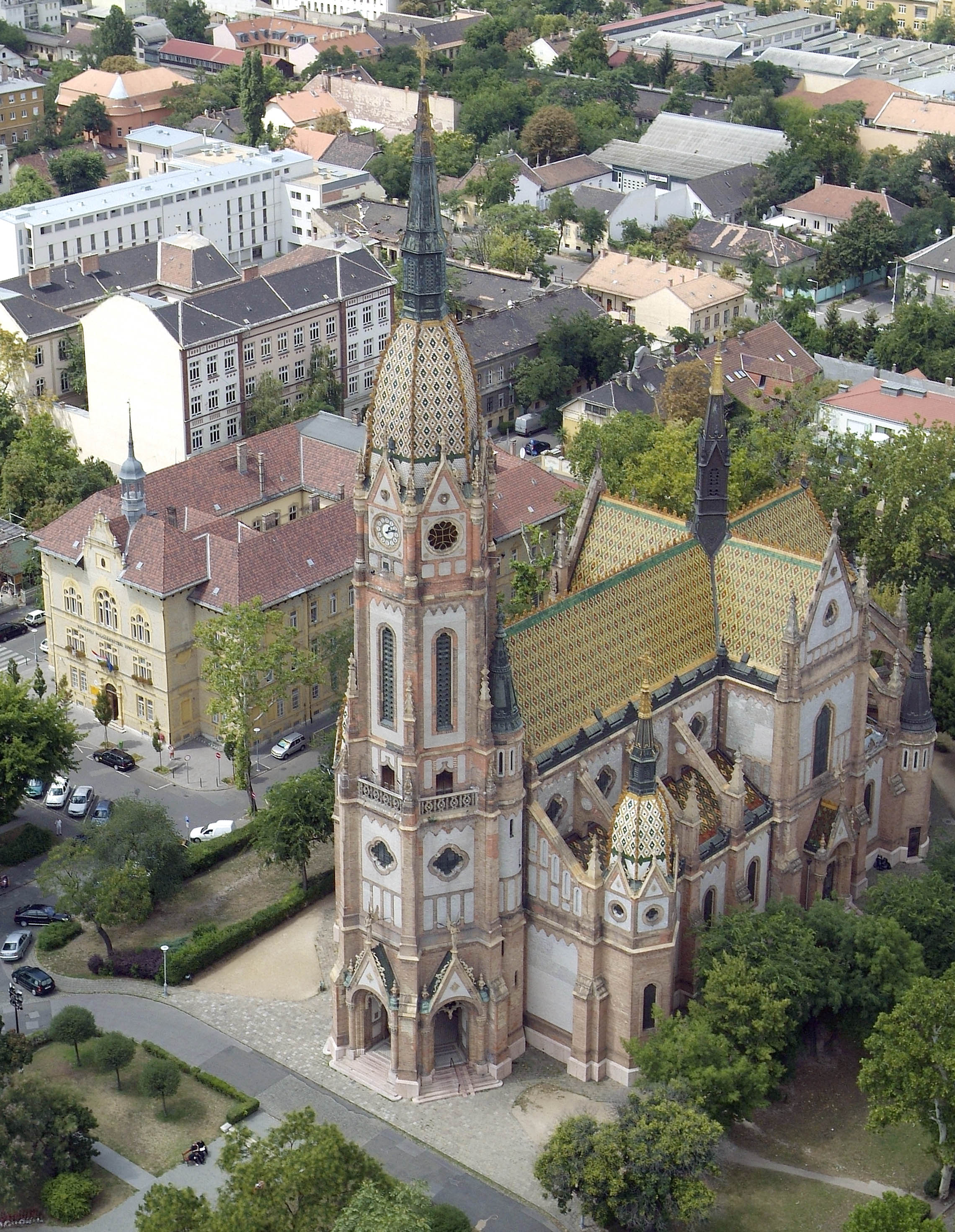

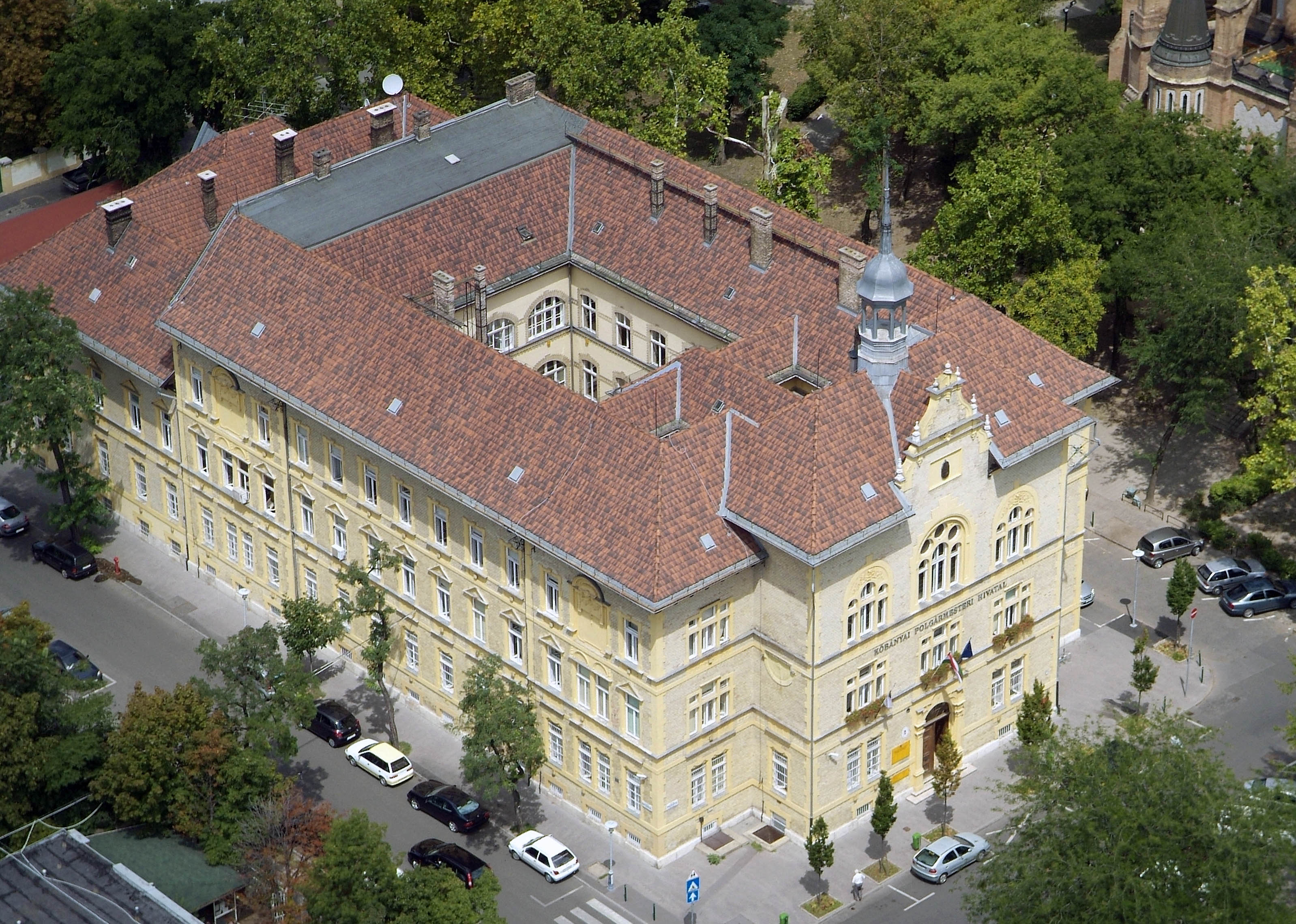

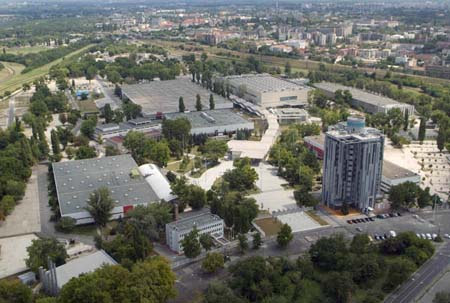

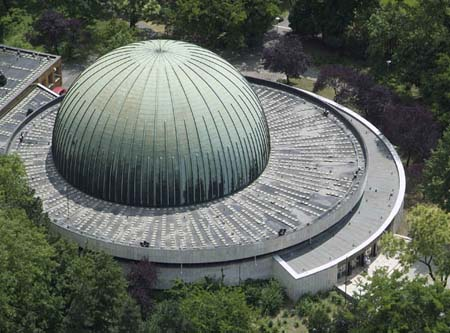

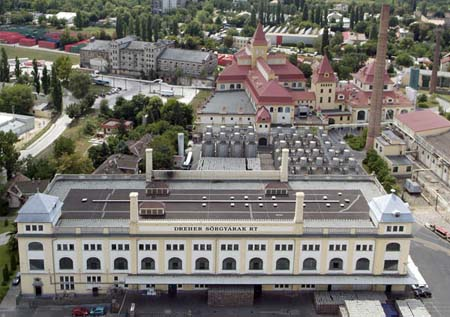

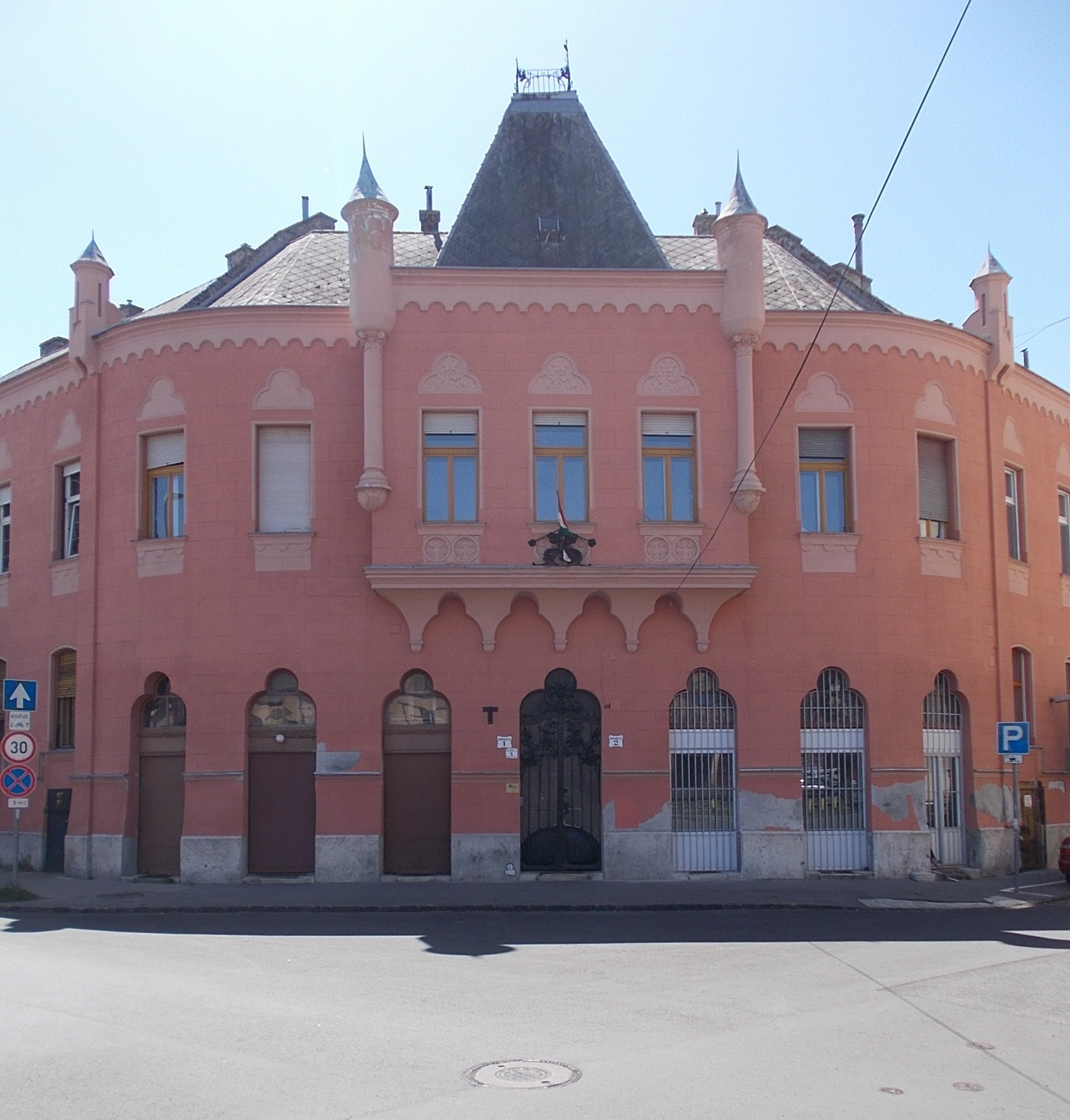
