= Kőbánya cellar system =

Network of tunnels under the 10th district of Budapest

Kőbánya cellar system, cellar system of Kőbánya (kőbányai pincerendszer, kőbányai alagútrendszer)
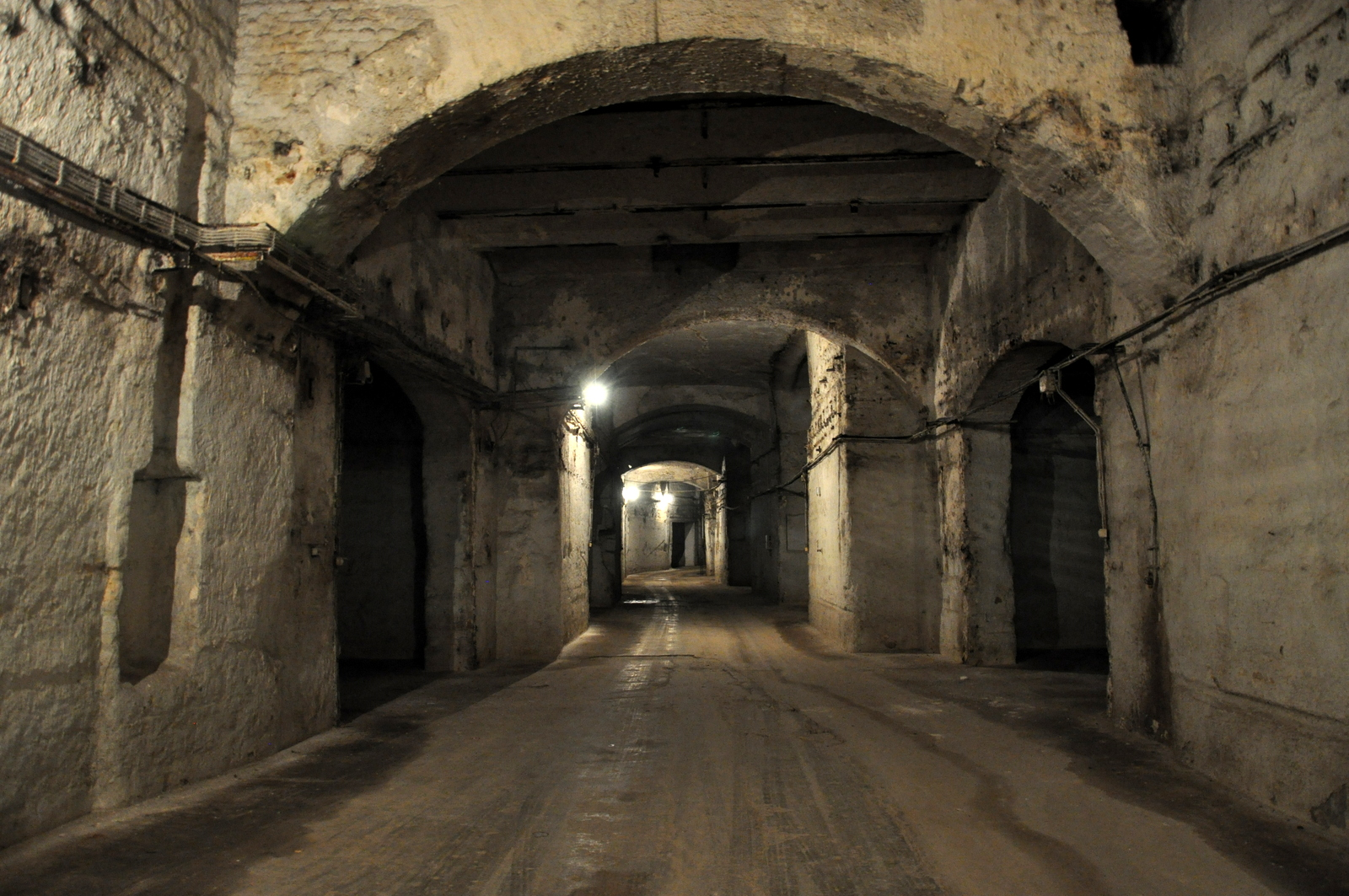
- One of the wide corridors in the tunnel complex

- Location within Budapest
- Location: District X (Kőbánya), Budapest, , Hungary; 47°29′6″N 19°8′14″E
- Products: limestone (as a quarry), groundwater (as part of beer brewery premises), aircraft engines (as an assembly plant), edible mushrooms (as a cellar complex)
- Type: underground slope mine
- Greatest depth: approx. 30 m (98 ft) (from surface)
- Opened: around 1244 (as a quarry); unknown (as a wine cellar complex); 1844 (as a beer cellar complex); 1944 (World War II) (as an engine assembly plant); unknown (World War II) (as a shelter); 1990s (as a mushroom cellar complex); 2010 (as a sport/recreation venue)
- Closed: unknown (19th century) (as a wine cellar complex); 1890 (as a quarry); 1944 (World War II) (as an engine assembly plant); 2000s (as a mushroom cellar complex)
- Company: Kőbánya district government (through Kőbánya Asset Manager Jsc.), Dreher Beer Breweries
- Website: www.facebook.com/KobanyaiPincerendszer/ (e-mail: pincekvzrt.hu)
- Acquired: March 1948 (nationalization)

The Kőbánya cellar system or cellar system of Kőbánya (IPA: [ˈkøːbaːɲɒ]; in Hungarian: kőbányai pincerendszer, "cellar system of Kőbánya", or kőbányai alagútrendszer, "tunnel system of Kőbánya"), sometimes known to non-Hungarians simply as the Kőbánya Mine, or the Kobanya Mine, is an extensive network of subterranea, or underground spaces, in the 10th district of Budapest (Kőbánya), in Hungary. It is considered to be the largest cellar complex in the country. The complex as a whole started as an underground limestone quarry in a wine-growing area of present-day Kőbánya in the Middle Ages. Later wineries and beer breweries were established on the premises and they continued to use some of the underground spaces. During the Second World War, the dimensions of the complex enabled it to be used as a covert aircraft engine assembly plant and a civilian hideout. Since 2008, Kőbánya Asset Manager Jsc. organizes free guided tours annually (during Saint László Days), which introduce visitors to both the complex and the Havas Villa (erroneously also known as the Dreher Villa), one of the most notable properties connected to it. The underground complex is one of the locations that are participating in the European Heritage Days.

The floor area of the complex is variously estimated to be somewhere between 180,000–220,000 m^{2} (1,900,000–2,400,000 sq ft; 44–54 acres) and the combined length of the tunnels is estimated to be around 32–35 km (20–22 mi). Corridors 3–6 m (9.8–19.7 ft) wide and halls 10 m (33 ft) high are common in it. The deepest part is approximately 30 m (98 ft) under the ground surface. The nature of limestone makes the spaces of the complex moist and moldy, and some parts are actually heavily flooded by groundwater. Currently the bulk of the tunnel system is the property of the Kőbánya district government (through its company Kőbánya Asset Manager Jsc., Kőbányai Vagyonkezelő Zrt.), a small portion is still owned by the Dreher Beer Breweries, who still actively uses some of the cellar spaces, and other small areas are in use by wineries. As of 2007, the Kőbánya tunnel system was not under architectural protection. The complex is sometimes referred to as an "underground city" or as an "underground world".

== Name ==
In Hungarian, the tunnel complex is known only as the circumlocutions kőbányai pincerendszer (cellar system of Kőbánya), or kőbányai alagútrendszer (tunnel system of Kőbánya), using no capitalization as per established orthography rules. The complex is also often metonymically referred to as the "Dreher cellars", the "Dreher cellar system", or the "brewery/beer cellars of Kőbánya", by association with the Dreher Beer Breweries which was a main user of it. This is an example of pars pro toto, as the brewery never came close to using the full extent of the complex.

The otherwise unnamed limestone quarry sites which formed the network of tunnels gave the later municipal district, Kőbánya, its name, and kőbánya is in fact the sole Hungarian word for "quarry". Non-Hungarian individuals (especially divers) or media sometimes call the cellar system the "Kőbánya Mine", the "Kobanya Mine" or even the "Kobayna Mine" (a clear misspelling), as if this was the actual name of the mining sites, but technically speaking this is a misnomer (and a case of totum pro parte), as the sites never had Kőbánya as a formal name in any manner, and so the capitalized noun Kőbánya can only refer to the 10th district of Budapest in Hungarian. The only semantically correct way to refer to the Kőbánya quarry sites is to use the redundant form kőbányai kőbányák (literally, "the quarries of Quarry").

== History ==
=== Limestone mining ===
The tunnel system originated as an underground limestone quarry in an area which was known as Kőér (roughly "Stone Vein") in present-day Kőbánya. The area's name appears as Kewer (or Kőér in modern Hungarian orthography) in a royal charter written by Béla IV (in which he donated a piece of land to the city of Pest), a name of a 147 m (482 ft) high hill. This evidence suggests that the area was used as a source of limestone from at least the 13th century, but it is likely that the area provided limestone even in the Antiquity. The exact variant is known as Sarmatian limestone, which was formed from the deposits of the Pannonian Sea in the Central European Sarmatian stage of the upper-middle Miocene era, approximately 11.6–12.7 million years ago.

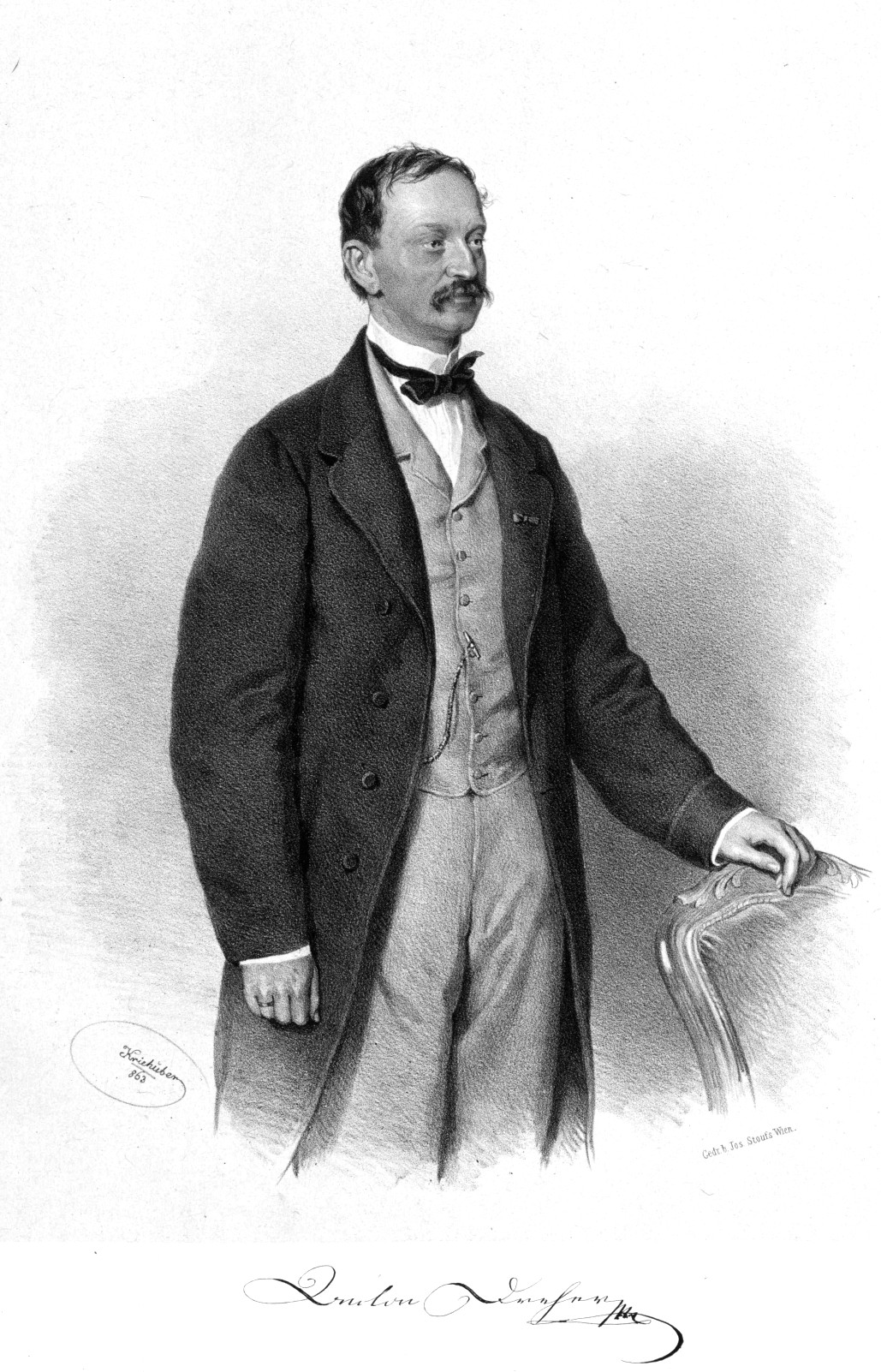
Anton Dreher Sr. (id. Dréher Antal), one of the first prominent users of the tunnel complex

The Kőér quarry's activity have risen significantly in the early 17th century, and then experienced even more heightened output in the 19th century, as it provided limestone for the construction (or renovation) of some of the most prominent buildings in present-day Budapest;

- the Parliament,
- the Széchenyi Chain Bridge,
- the Citadella,
- the Fisherman's Bastion,
- the Matthias Church,
- the State Opera House,
- the Hungarian Academy of Sciences's building,
- the Margaret Bridge,
- ELTE's University Library and Archive,
- the Royal Hungarian Ludovica Home Defense Academy's main building, and
- the Castle Hill Tunnel's façades.

The quarry served as a material source for many of the buildings of Pest which were built after the devastating flood of 1834, as well as for many of the villas of Andrássy Avenue.

It is likely that the name of Fehér út (White Road) was the result of the presence of white limestone dust, as the road was the main route of transportation from the quarry sites to the Pest construction sites.

=== Winemaking and beer brewing ===
Even when the quarry was still in active production, routine mining practices, cave-ins (due to the inadequate mining techniques used) as well as the groundwater penetration caused parts of it to be abandoned continuously. Above the quarry there were large vineyards from the 17th century on, and so wineries and wine merchants started to use the abandoned sections, making them more akin to purpose-built wine cellars.

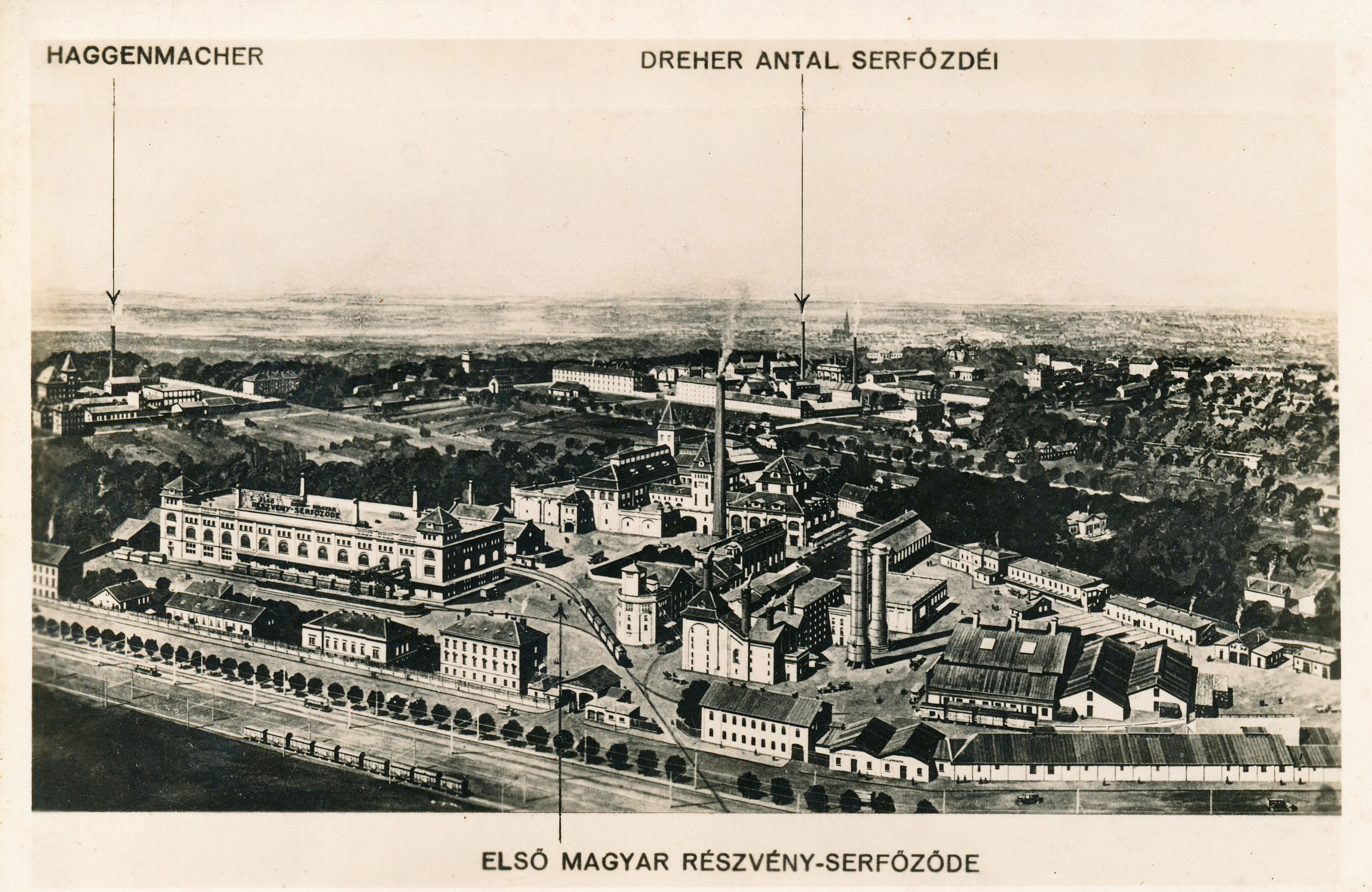
Postcard from 1928, showing the Dreher Brewery Combine which used groundwater from under the tunnels

While winemaking ceased in the area because of the large-scale European "phylloxera plague" of the second half of the 19th century, beer breweries also settled in the area to exploit the tunnels. Péter Schmiedt was the first to establish his Kőbánya Beer House Company (Kőbányai Serház Társaság) on the premises in 1844. The company continued to use some of the underground spaces as fermentation cellars, and drilled deep wells to exploit the limestone-filtered, clean groundwater under the quarry tunnels for beer production.

The Austrian businessman and brewer Anton Dreher Sr. (known in Hungary as Antal Dréher) bought Schmiedt's company and its related assets in 1862 to eliminate competition and to expand his Austrian brewery company, Klein-Schwechat Brewing House (Klein-Schwechater Brauhaus), and continued to use portions of the underground spaces as cellars. The brewery site became known simply as the Steinbruch Brewery (Brauerei Steinbruch), reflecting the German name of Kőbánya. In the following years, Dreher's son, Anton Jr. bought up and integrated the neighboring rival breweries that were also settled in the vicinity. In 1907, this Kőbánya site became an independent company, led by Dreher's youngest grandson, Eugene (Jenő) Dreher, as Antal Dreher's Kőbánya Beer Brewery (Dreher Antal Kőbányai Serfőzdéje). The Dreher family's companies were the most significant developer and producer of pale lager beer up until World War I. In the 1920s, the brewery controlled 70% of the beer market in Hungary. In the 1930s, the Dreher Brewery Combine have already acquired almost all of the neighboring breweries: the Haggenmacher Brewery, the First Hungarian Stock Brewery, and the Capital City Brewery, leaving only the Civic Brewery independent.

Meanwhile, due to the general instability of the tunnel system, limestone mining was officially banned in 1890, although the system was still used for acquiring limestone as late as 1911 to repair the Reformed Church of Kecskemét, which was damaged in a 5.6 M_{w} earthquake the same year.

=== World War II ===
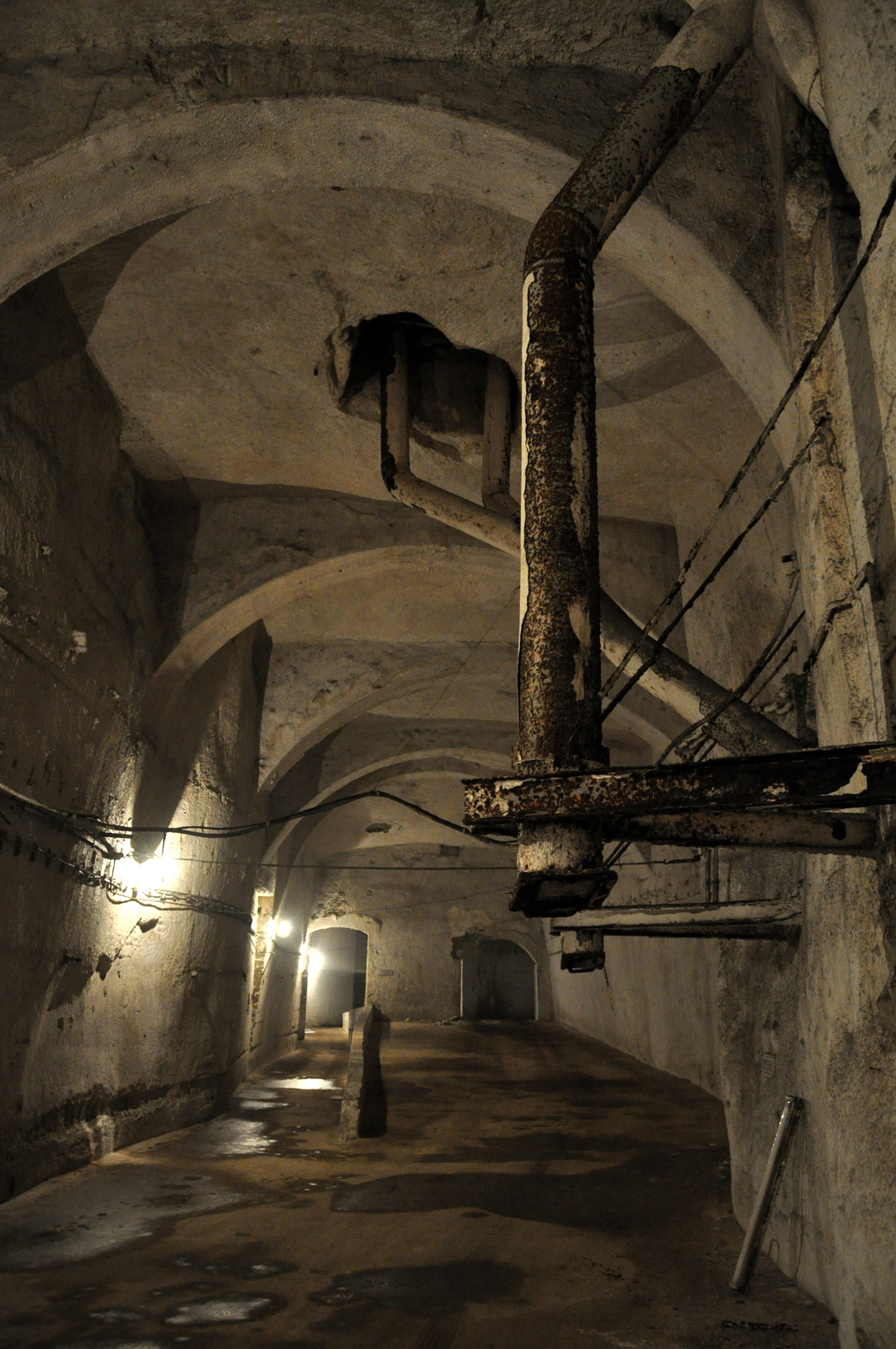
An area of the complex showing vertical ground separation (the pipe was for the transportation of barley used in the malting process)

During the Second World War, due to fears of Allied bombing campaigns, parts of the complex were used as a covert aircraft engine assembly plant most likely by the Danubian Aircraft Factory (Dunai Repülőgépgyár), the enterprise responsible for the domestic license production of the Messerschmitt Me 210C heavy fighter (designated as Me 210Ca-1 in the Luftwaffe), which were to be either delivered to or fully assembled in Germany. The workers were able to produce more than 200 engines until production was relocated into Germany as Red Army troops came close to Budapest. Other, smaller aircraft factories also used the complex during the war.

Throughout the war, especially during the siege of Budapest, the complex also acted as a shelter for civilians. At least one specific hall, which was referred to as a "chapel" (kápolna) by the miners, served as a place of worship to hold Sunday masses during the siege.

=== Postwar abandonment and cave-ins ===
All of the abandoned tunnel system of the quarry and the Dreher Brewery cellar system (along with the Dreher family's company) was nationalized in March 1948. In the next year, the brewery was united with other nationalized companies as well as being renamed, and the premises became known as Site No. 1 of the Kőbánya Beer Brewery (Kőbányai Sörgyár 1. számú telephely) in the communist era. After the transition to market economy, in 1992, the now-private company acquired the rights from the Austrian legal successor of the original Dreher company to use the Dreher name again, and became Dreher Beer Breweries (Dreher Sörgyárak).

Between the 1950s and the early 1970s the mining tunnels and the central mine courtyards (mélyudvar) of the Óhegy area were filled with construction debris, meters of communal waste, and earth to rehabilitate land, which then gave place to the Hungarian-Soviet Friendship Park, today's Óhegy Park.

In the evening hours of 6 June 2004, a cave-in occurred in the park, killing a 62-year-old man; the victim had fallen into the 80–85 cm (31–33 in) wide and 6–8 m (20–26 ft) or 10–15 m (33–49 ft) deep pit that formed under him. The victim died because of the toxic gases of the rotting waste, not from the fall. This caused a roughly one hectare part of the park to be fenced off citing soil stability issues.

Even before this incident, the park had at least two minor cave-ins. The problem was finally mitigated in 2012 (involving the help of a GHH LF 4.1 mine front loader), costing the district government 90 million forints (400,000 US dollars), and on 5 December 2012 the fence was removed and the area was restored to the public.

=== Rediscovery and reappropriation ===
Currently the bulk of the tunnel system is the property of the Kőbánya district government (through its company Kőbánya Asset Manager Jsc., Kőbányai Vagyonkezelő Zrt.), a small portion is still owned by the Dreher Beer Breweries, which still actively uses some of the cellar spaces. Other small areas of the complex are in use by wineries. The most prominent human activity in the past decades within the tunnel complex was the commercial growing of edible mushrooms in some sections, generally in corridors and smaller halls. However this practice was outlawed by European Union regulations and so mushroom production ceased in the latter parts of the 2000s. Starting from 2007, the complex hosts guided walking tours as well as diving tours, cycling and running competitions and other recreational events.

In 2012, the complex was used as testing grounds for the capabilities of the portable REGARD Muontomograph by a group of Hungarian scientists and engineers from Eötvös Loránd University, the Wigner Research Center for Physics, and the Budapest University of Technology and Economics, to demonstrate the use of muon tomography in geophysical surveying of underground structures.

On 21 February 2014, a physical geocache was hidden in the tunnel complex.

In March 2015, the Hamburg Fire and Rescue Service visited the complex as part of their "4. LLG 2.1" training course, in the EU's Exchange of Experts initiative.

In 2015, the record-holder Austrian freediver Christian Redl dived in the flooded parts of the complex for a GoPro promotional video.

=== The S1 Project and future plans ===
In the past decades, the Kőbánya district government developed ideas about the future use of the Dreher Brewery premises and the tunnel complex under it, such as operating a dark ride in the tunnels. In 2005, the district government has envisioned a project which would turn the premises into a cultural and entertainment venue with a theme park, this became known as the S1 Project. The code "S1" refers to the historical brewery premises; as "beer brewery" is sörgyár or sörfőzde, and the premises were known as the no. 1 production site of the brewery. The project anticipates that the premises would contain a musical stage, an event hall, galleries, studios, clubs, coffee houses, restaurants, a beer museum, a mass transit stop, and hotels among other things. The concept also calls for the construction of apartment buildings in the area which would provide thousands of apartments. The development of the project would involve using the tunnel system in some form, possibly being opened up by artificial ravines. The Kőbánya Asset Manager Jsc. was in talks with Austrian historian Günter Bischof, whose involvement resulted in three project plans submitted by four architectural firms; Erick van Egeraat Architects (EEA), Zoboki Design & Architecture (ZDA), Sporaarchitects, and Naos Architecture.

The preparation of the S1 Project is being done by the Kőbánya Asset Manager Jsc. in the framework of Budapest's medium-term development program, the Podmaniczky Program, with the financial support of the EU. The project was a part of the EU's brownfield rehabilitation program MISTER (Military and Industrial SiTEs Reuse) as well as the Interreg III B-level CADSES (Central European–Adriatic–Danubian–South-Eastern European Space) cooperation, but did not gather enough interest from potential investors. In 2009, the cost of the realization was estimated at 120 billion forints (395,856,700 US dollars), while the S1 Project area was valued at 5 billion forints (16,494,029 dollars). In 2012, more than two-thirds of the involved real estate was the property of the district government, with the remainder being the property of a few private companies. Administering the complex costs the Kőbánya district government around 70–80 million forints (230,916–263,904 dollars) annually.

== Structure ==
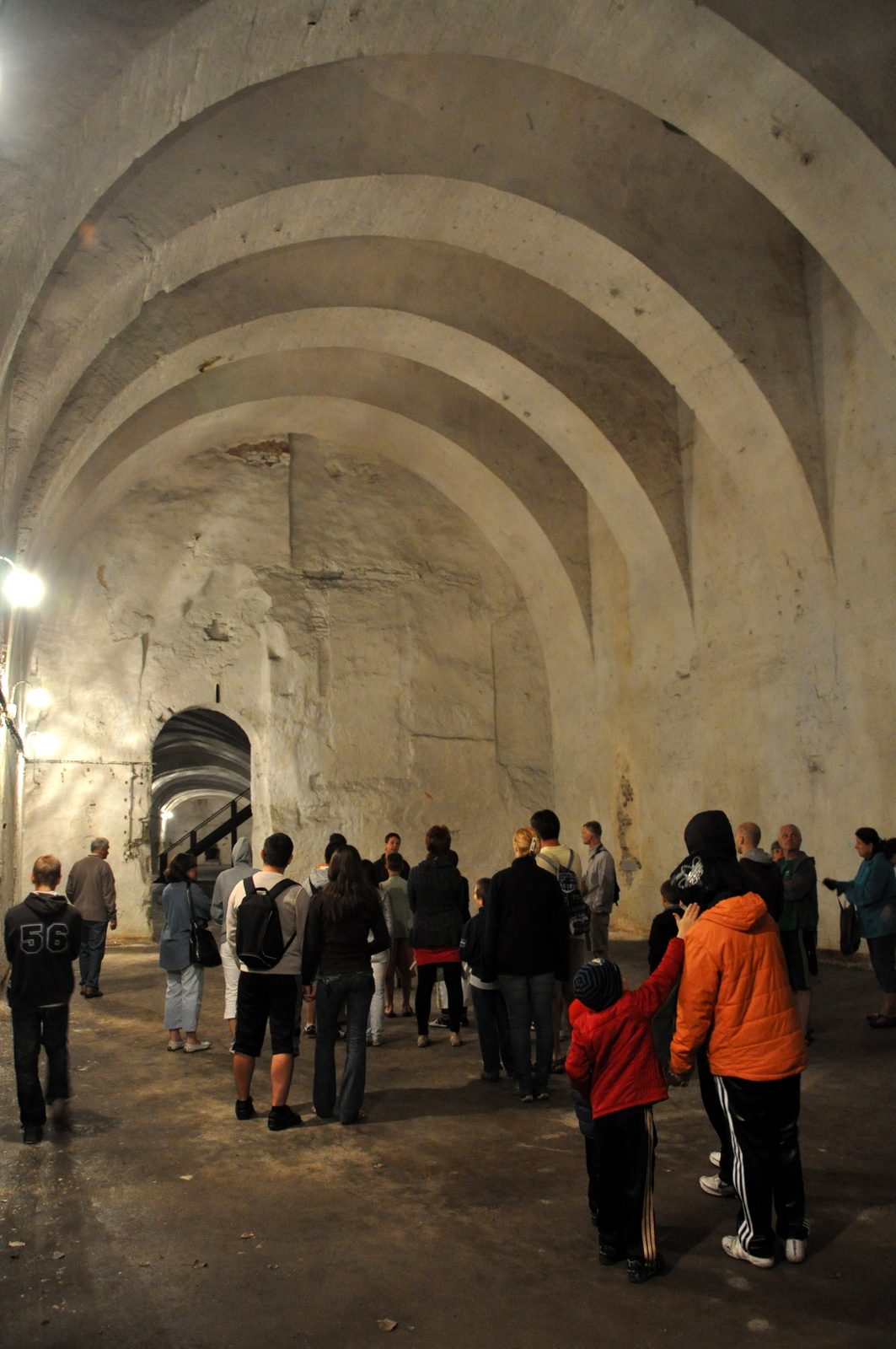
One of the halls

=== General characteristics ===
While intricate, the Kőbánya complex can be divided into two general, interconnected areas: a larger, somewhat more mine-like part which is in district ownership, and a smaller, more cellar-like part which is in private ownership, although usually these are considered as one single entity in public discourse, since they had the same origins.

The tunnel system was originally a slope mine with gentle inclinations, which used the room and pillar method for the limestone production. The shape of the passages and excavation halls has a comb-like pattern. The complex has multiple levels within, and (due to cave-ins, tunnel closures and floodings, along with the poor mining documentation) its full extent is not fully surveyed or mapped. Even so, it is considered to be the largest cellar complex in Hungary.

The floor area of the complex is estimated to be either around 180,000 m^{2} (1,900,000 sq ft; 18 ha; 44 acres), 195,000–196,000 m^{2} (2,100,000–2,110,000 sq ft; 19.5–19.6 ha; 48–48 acres) or 220,000 m^{2} (2,400,000 sq ft; 22 ha; 54 acres). The combined length of the tunnels is estimated to be 32–33 km (19.9–20.5 mi) or 35 km (21.7 mi), according to different sources and estimations. Corridors 3–6 m (9.8–19.7 ft) wide and "church-like" halls 10 m (33 ft) high are common in it, with some of the halls reaching sizes of 10–12 m (33–39 ft) in height and 8–10 m (26–33 ft) in width. Some of the taller halls were later divided into two levels with reinforced concrete slabs. There is at least three halls there are referred to as "chapels" (kápolna), these are named after major world religions. One such chapel hall was originally an open mine court which was covered with brick arches. The average depth of the tunnels under the ground surface is around 10–15 m (33–49 ft). The deepest part of any tunnel or hall is approximately 30 m (98 ft), measured from the ground surface above it to the bottom surface of the tunnel. However, one of the flooded machinery halls of the Dreher Brewery reaches into a depth of roughly 44 m (144 ft), but it is unclear if it could be considered as part of the tunnel complex. There are ventilation shafts above some of the tunnels, these are 1 m (3.3 ft) in diameter and generally 10–20 m (33–66 ft) long. The average density of rock around the complex is 1.8 ± 0.1 g/cm^{3} (1.040 ± 0.058 oz/cu in).

The air temperature is around 12–15 °C (54–59 °F) (according to other sources, 6–8 °C (43–46 °F), or 10 °C (50 °F)) throughout the complex.

The complex originally had dozens of entry locations, some of them are:

- Bánya Street entry (Bánya Street 35–37), the current main entry point
- Halom Street entry
- Havas Villa (aka Dreher Villa)

Despite being abandoned, the complex still has working lighting, including some underwater floodlights installed in flooded areas to enhance diving.

=== Subnetworks ===
The whole complex that is often referred to as the "Kőbánya cellar system" is in fact a grouping of one large, intricate tunnel network with two main parts, and a few isolated, smaller tunnel systems. These are largely under three well-defined areas of Kőbánya: Óhegy (Old Hill), Újhegy (New Hill), and the Dreher Brewery premises, now known as the "S1 Project area" or just "S1 area".

The main subnetwork, the Dreher/S1 Project network, starts at the intersection of Kőrösi Csoma Road, Kolozsvári Street and Jászberényi Road (known as the "Tight Corner"; Éles-sarok), and continues along Jászberényi Road and Maglódi Road as far as Téglavető Street. This part of the subnetwork is more than 20 km (12 mi) long, and it is connected to the other part under the vicinity of the Vineyard Guard Tower (Csősztorony) next to Óhegy Park. The second part is surrounded by Harmat Street, Ihász Street, Halom Street, Bebek Road and Halom End. The cellar floor area under the Dreher premises is around 40,000–45,000 m^{2} (430,000–480,000 sq ft), with a combined passage length of 6 km (3.7 mi). The depth from surface to the cellar grounds is about 15–20 m (49–66 ft). According to different sources, the temperature is about 8 °C (46 °F) or 14–16 °C (57–61 °F).

One of the biggest isolated tunnel systems is the one which is under Óhegy Park (the former Hungarian-Soviet Friendship Park), along Szlávy Street, facing the end of Száraz Street. Some of it were filled with construction debris, meters of communal waste, and earth to rehabilitate land. This network is almost 1 km (0.62 mi) long and 16 m (52 ft) deep. It was roughly 1.3 km (0.81 mi) long before the cave-in mitigation works done in 2012. Sources also give the following post-mitigation characteristics: the tunnel system has a floor area of 5,500 m^{2} (59,000 sq ft), with tunnels 4–6 m (13–20 ft) wide and 3–5 m (9.8–16.4 ft) high; the thickness of rock and soil above the tunnels is between 12–22 m (39–72 ft). The air temperature is around 18 °C (64 °F). The Óhegy tunnels were continuously reinforced since 1996.

Two, way smaller tunnel "systems" are located alongside Algyógyi Street and Kocka Street, as well as at the intersection of Kőér Street and Petrőczy Street.

=== Flooded areas and wells ===
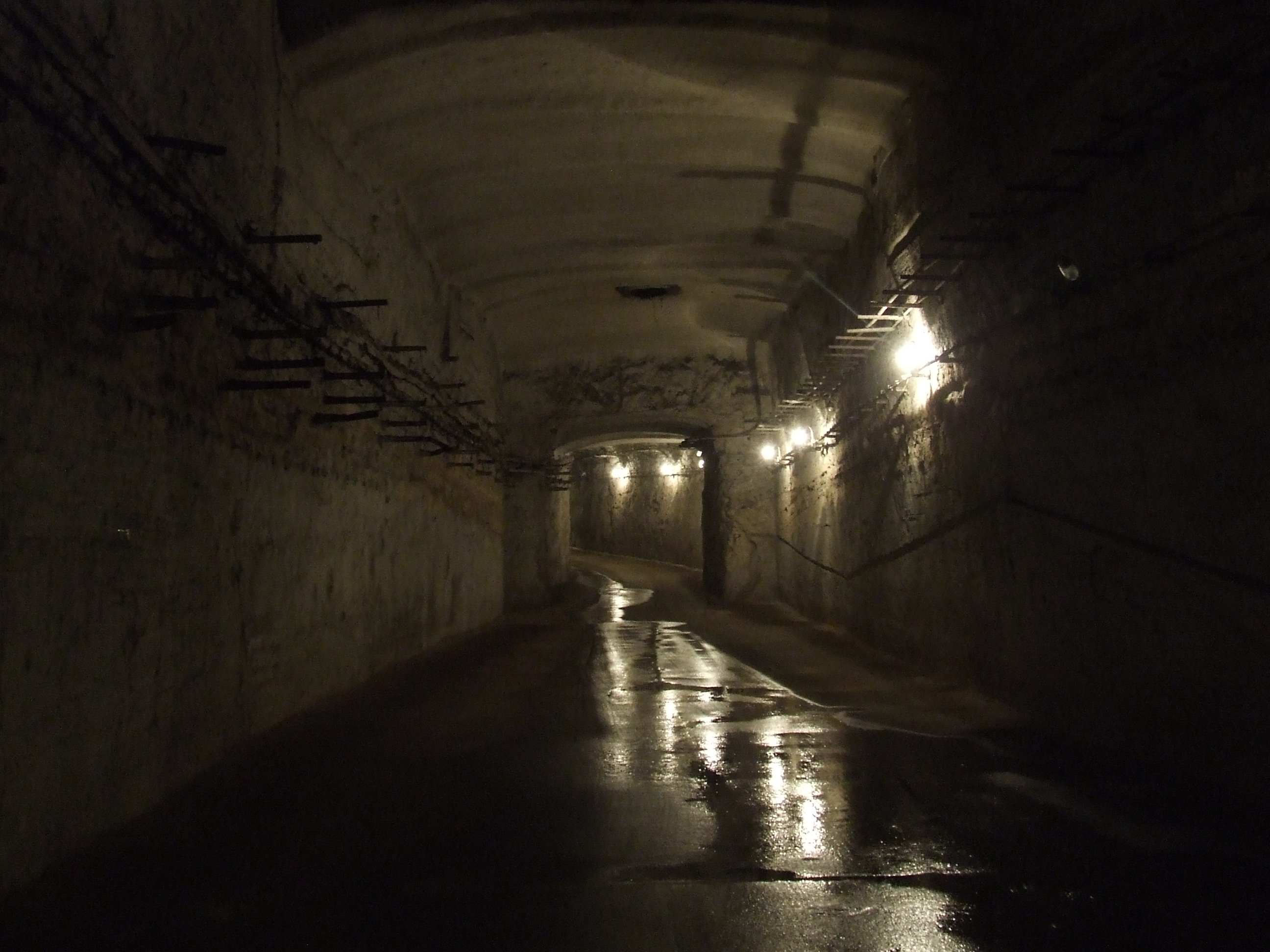
Pit water is a permanent feature of the tunnels

Due to the hygroscopic (water absorbing) nature of limestone and the presence of groundwater, some of the deeper parts of the complex are permanently flooded, and even the unflooded parts have moist, moldy walls and flowing or pooling pit water. The flooding is generally present around the wells that were used by the Dreher Brewery. Some flooded areas are deeper than 18 m (59 ft) from the surface of the water, these could only be accessed by technical, cave, or wreck divers. There are four areas of flooding and 5 diving spots within, of which one does not require technical/cave/wreck diving qualifications and can be dived with only OWD qualifications.

The flood areas as identified by their original Dreher well (kút) names:

- Csíráztató kút (Sprouter Well), approximate depth: 32 m (105 ft)
- Kert kút (Garden Well), approximate depth: 36 m (118 ft)
- Lyukas kút (Hole Well), approximate depth: 29 m (95 ft)
- Park kút (Park Well), approximate depth: 30 m (98 ft) – one of the two diving spots requires only OWD qualifications

Other, unflooded wells include Champagne kút (Champagne Well) and Hipó kút (Hypo Well).

The water temperature is around 10–13 °C (50–55 °F), or according to other sources,13–14 °C (55–57 °F), or 6–8 °C (43–46 °F), and it is generally very clean and clear (aside from small floating debris from decaying equipment and considerable silt deposits in some halls), providing good visibility for navigating around with flashlights.

== Current uses ==
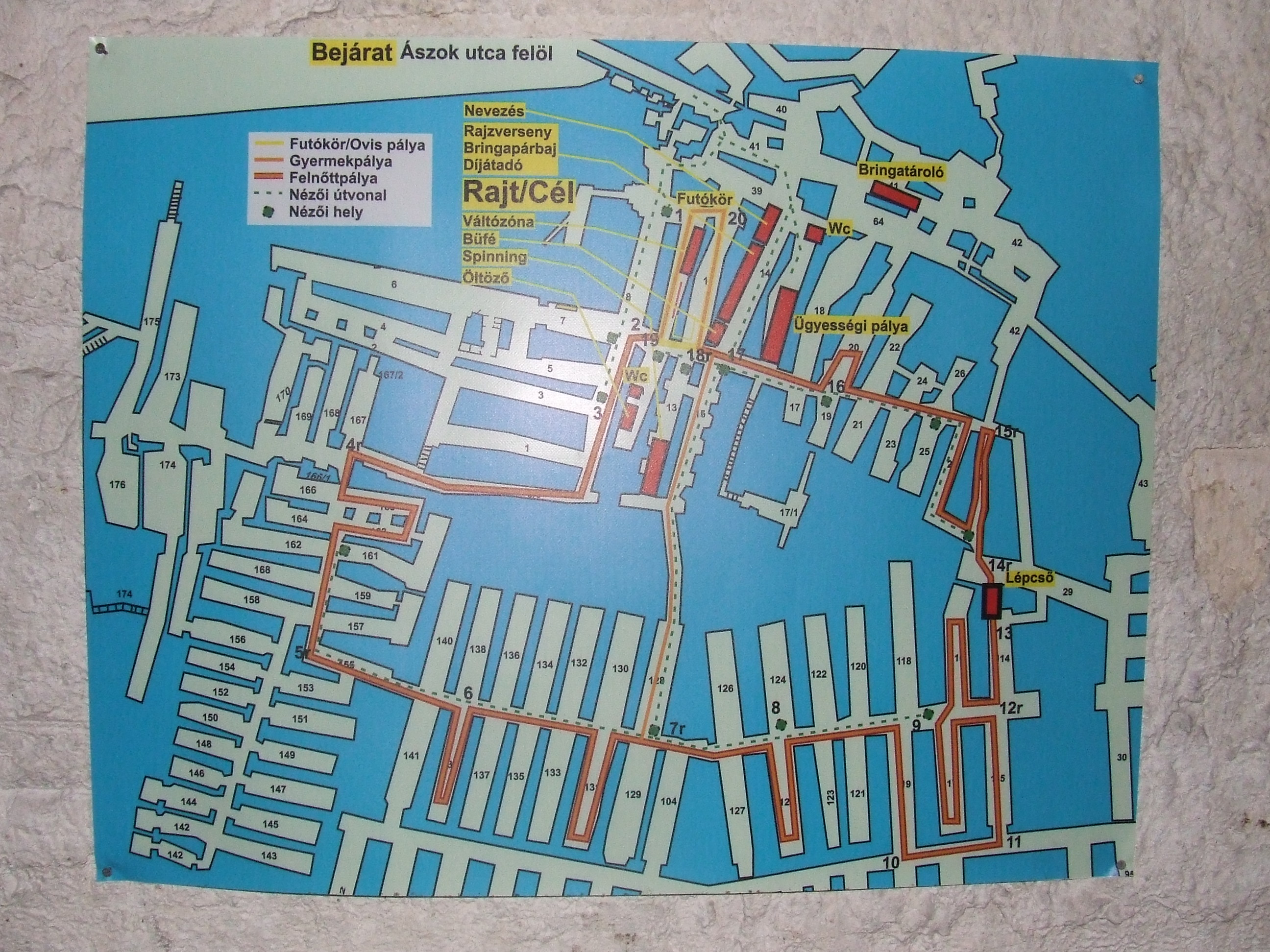
Partial map of the complex with designated running paths and temporary facilities marked

From time to time, the complex or the Dreher brewery buildings are used by filmmakers and other artists for their projects, including music videos and commercials. The most notable examples are the 2015 American action comedy film Spy, which had its opening scenes shot in the complex, and the 1989 Hungarian art film Meteo, which features the subterranean spaces in a post-apocalyptic manner in some scenes.

The complex hosts or hosted sporting and recreational events such as:

- guided visitor tours
  - public tours organized by Kőbánya Asset Manager Jsc. (annually since 2008, during Saint László Days in June)
  - private tours organized by the urban exploration and urban architecture blog Falanszter (roughly monthly)
- the MOFÉM Underworld Kupa (MOFÉM Underworld Cup) bicycle competition, part of the Mountainbike Challenge organized by Merkapt Maraton Sport Center (annually since 2010)
- the BBU Föld Alatti Futás (BBU Underground Run) and the Halloween Run events organized by BBU Organizing Bureau (2015)
- organized diving tours, with both open-water (with OWD or AOWD qualifications) and penetration/overhead diving, organized by Titán Diver Club and School (TBK Divers), Aquanaut, and Paprika Divers

== Portrayal and study ==
External videos
- 3D visualization of the cellar complex by Katalin Zsoldi (ELTE), YouTube video

Multiple television and webcast documentaries have featured the cellar complex, such as:

- Segye Tema Gihaeng: Heonggali (World Theme Travel: Hungary; with Hangul: 세계테마기행 - 헝가리) with Han Soo-yeon, a 4-episode South Korean travel documentary by EBS
- Láthatatlan Budapest (Invisible Budapest), a Hungarian webcast series by Heti Válasz (in season 1, episode 7, Egy kisebb várost is el lehetne rejteni Kőbánya alatt)
- Budapest Underground, a two-part Hungarian TV documentary by Filmdzsungel (in part 1)
- the Hungarian BudapestScenes webcast series (in the episodes titled Az 1944-es kőbányai föld alatti repülőgépgyártás és annak élő szemtanúja, Rezső bácsi and A kőbányai pincerendszer, mint óvóhely)

Katalin Zsoldi, a doctoral student of ELTE's Department of Cartography and Geoinformatics made a 3D visualization of various underground structures in Budapest, including the cellar complex.

== Gallery ==
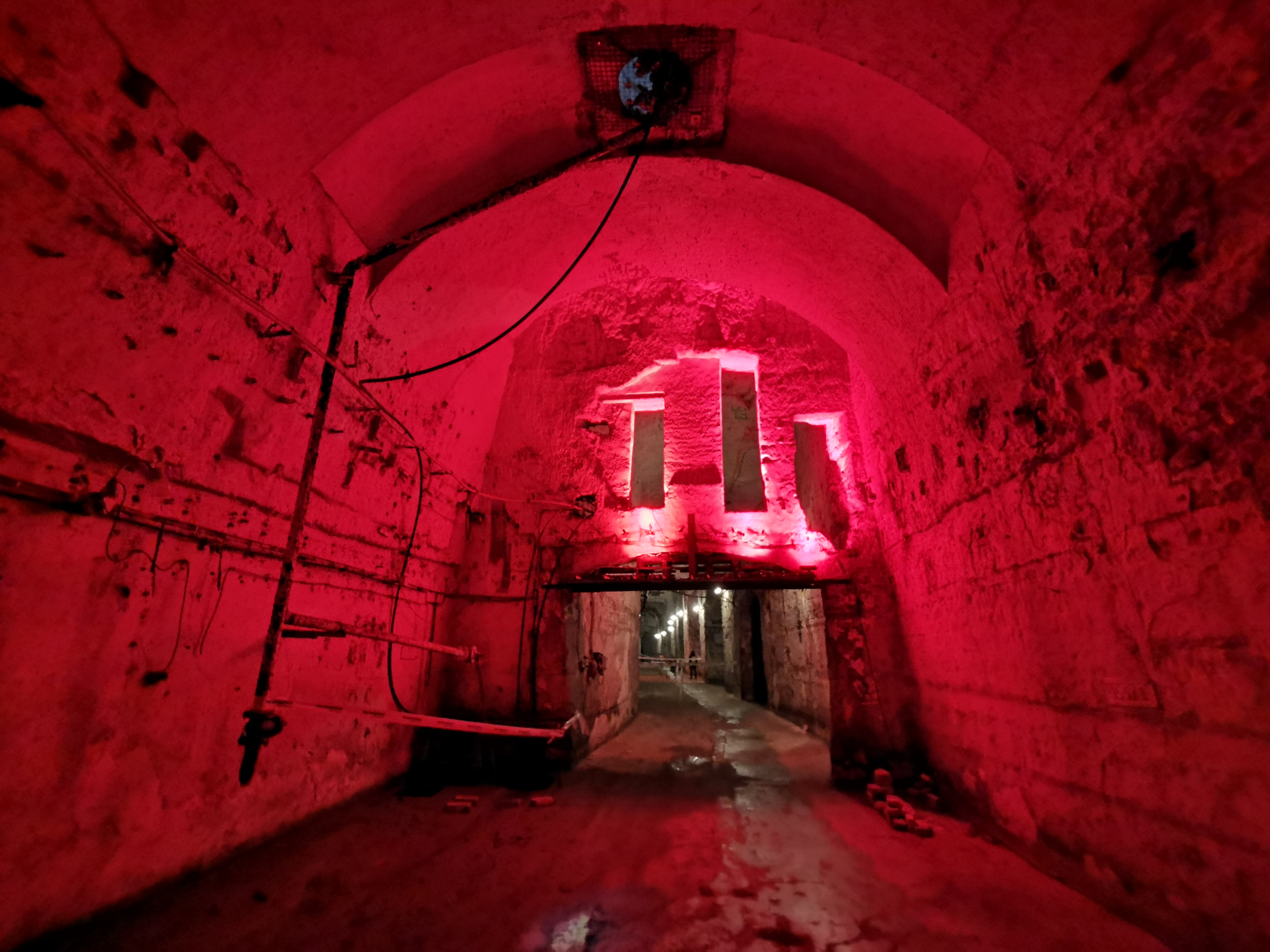

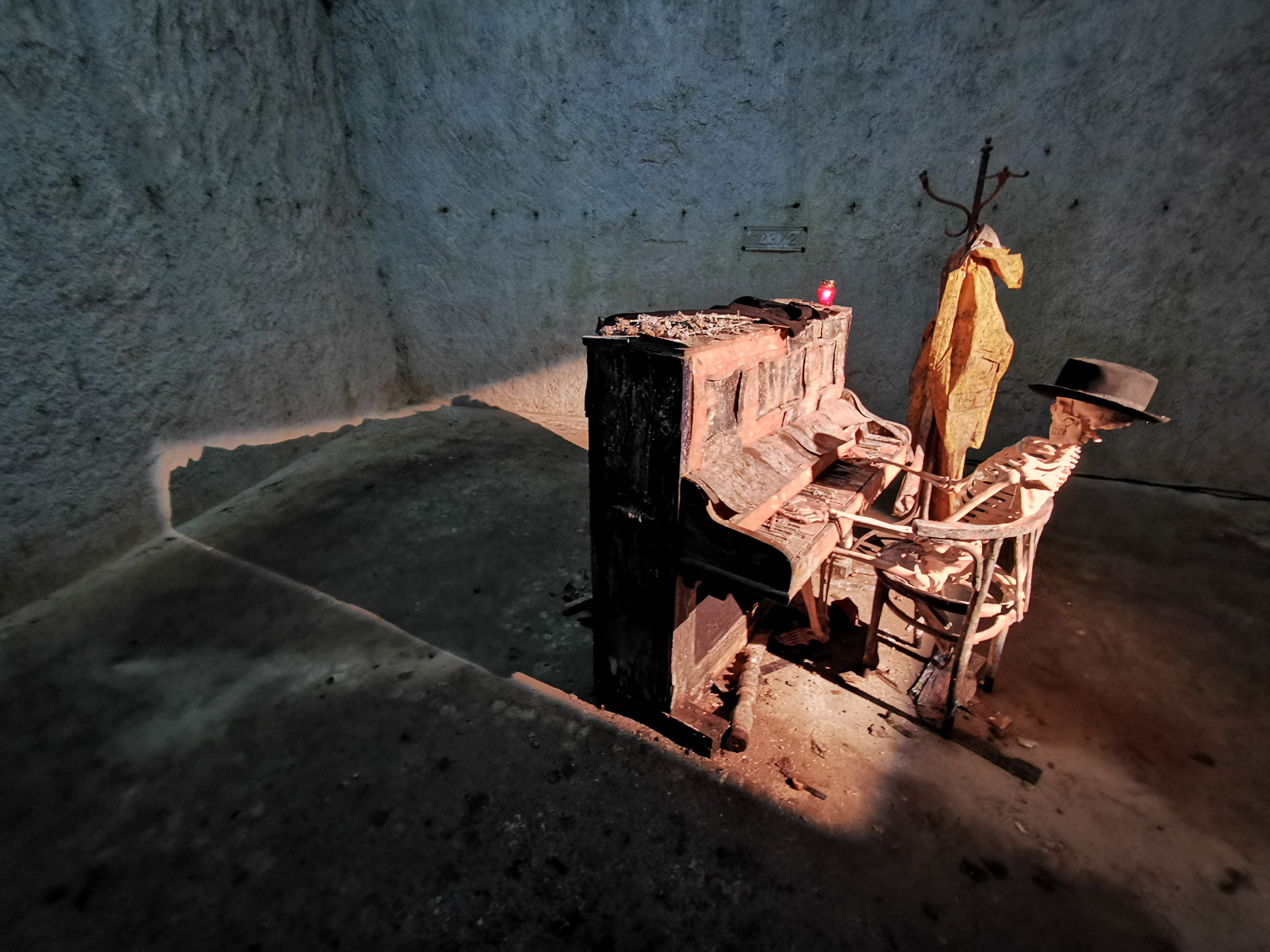

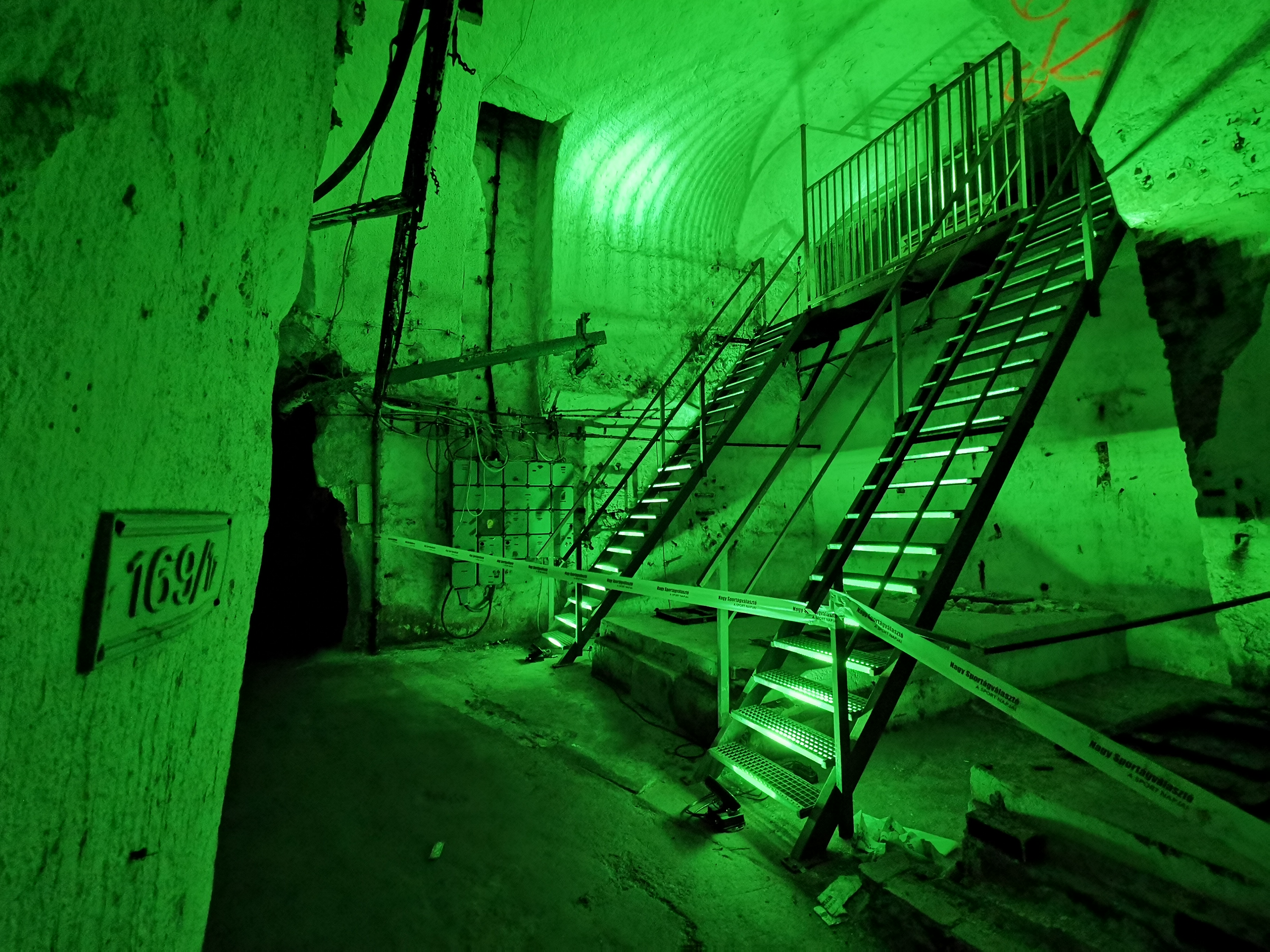

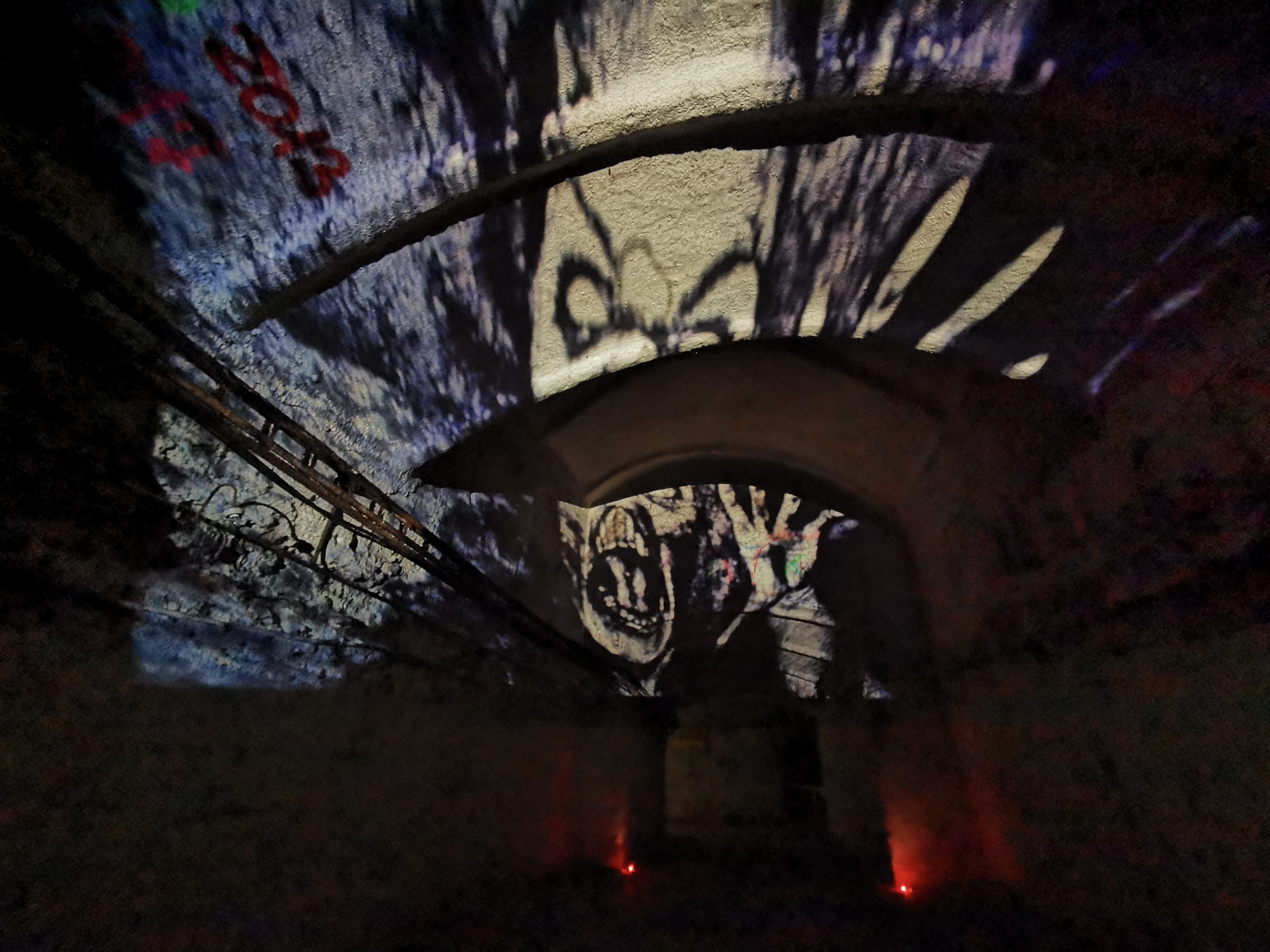

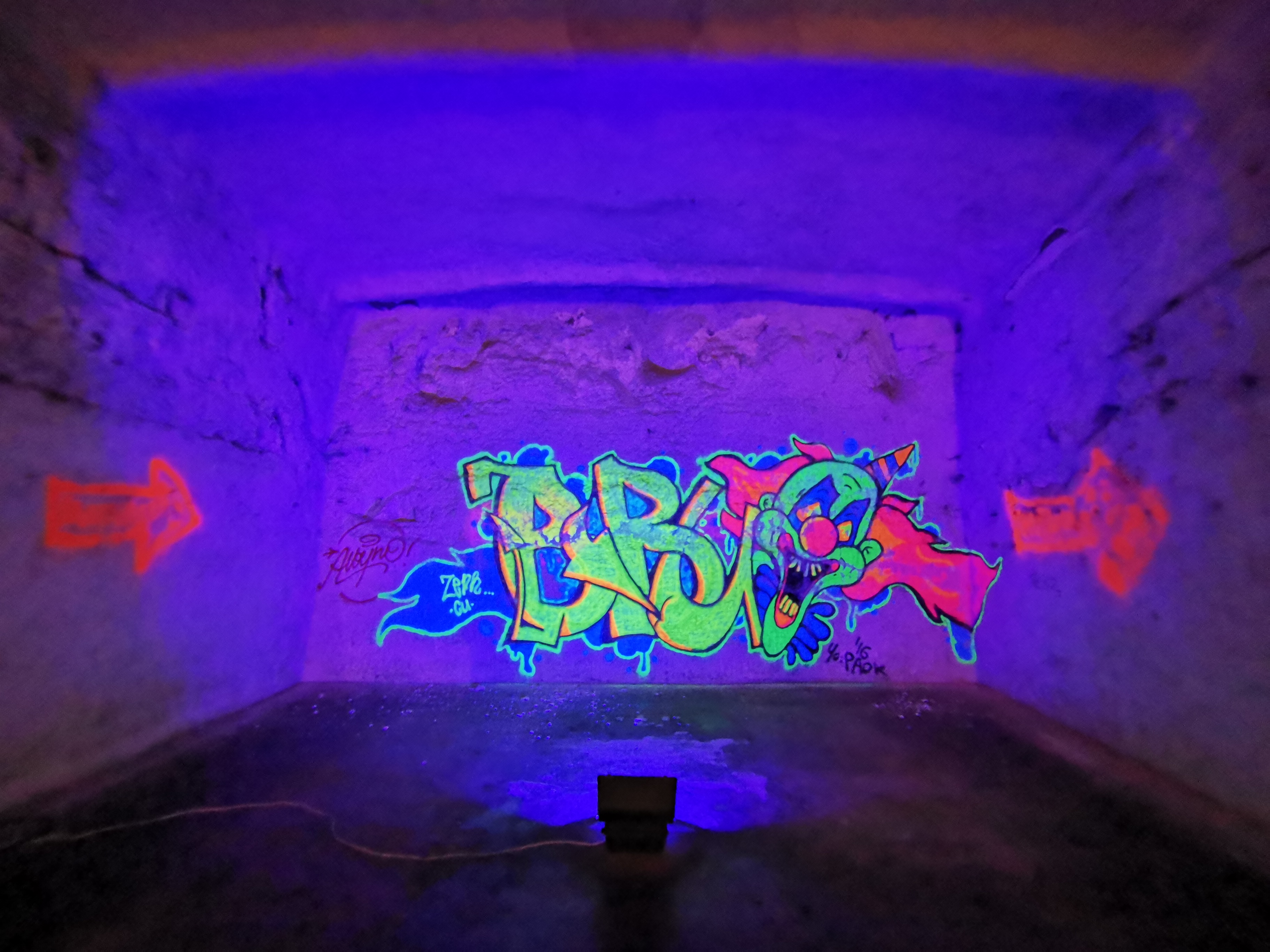

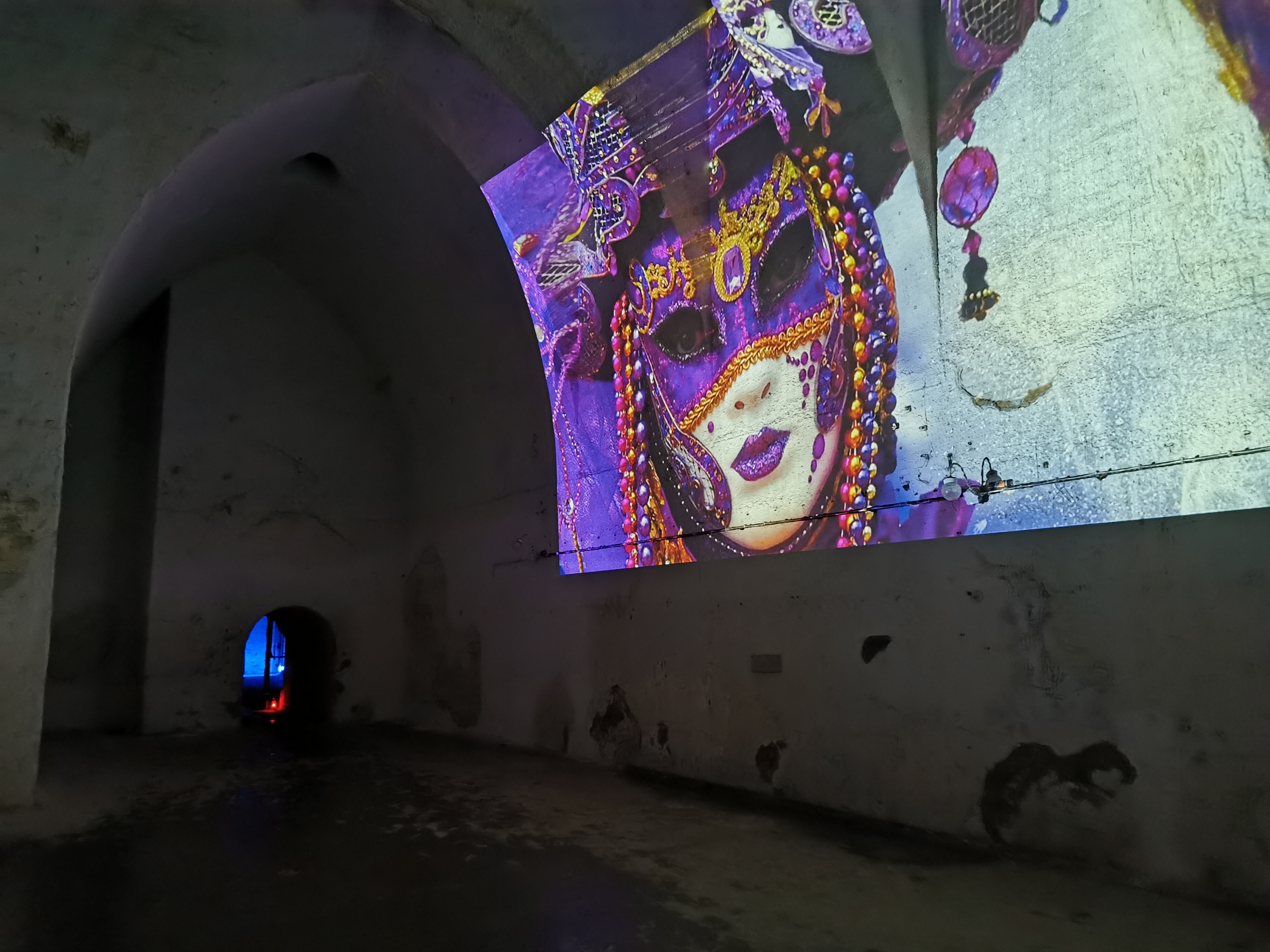

== See also ==
- Mines of Paris
- Chislehurst Caves
- Odessa Catacombs
- Mittelwerk
- Project Riese
- Weingut I
- Underground City of Beijing
- Underground Project 131
- Underground city
