= Meteo =

Meteo may refer to:

- The spelling, without accents, of Météo
- Meteo (film), a 1989 Hungarian film
- Meteo, an asteroid belt in the Star Fox series of video games
- Meteo, a magic spell in some of the Final Fantasy video games
- Meteo, a destructive planet in the video game Meteos
- METEO System, a machine translation system for weather bulletins
- Meteo is also used as a general abbreviation for meteorology
