= 816 Nuclear Military Plant =

Chinese underground nuclear weapons plant

Coordinates: 29.556882°N 107.507164°E

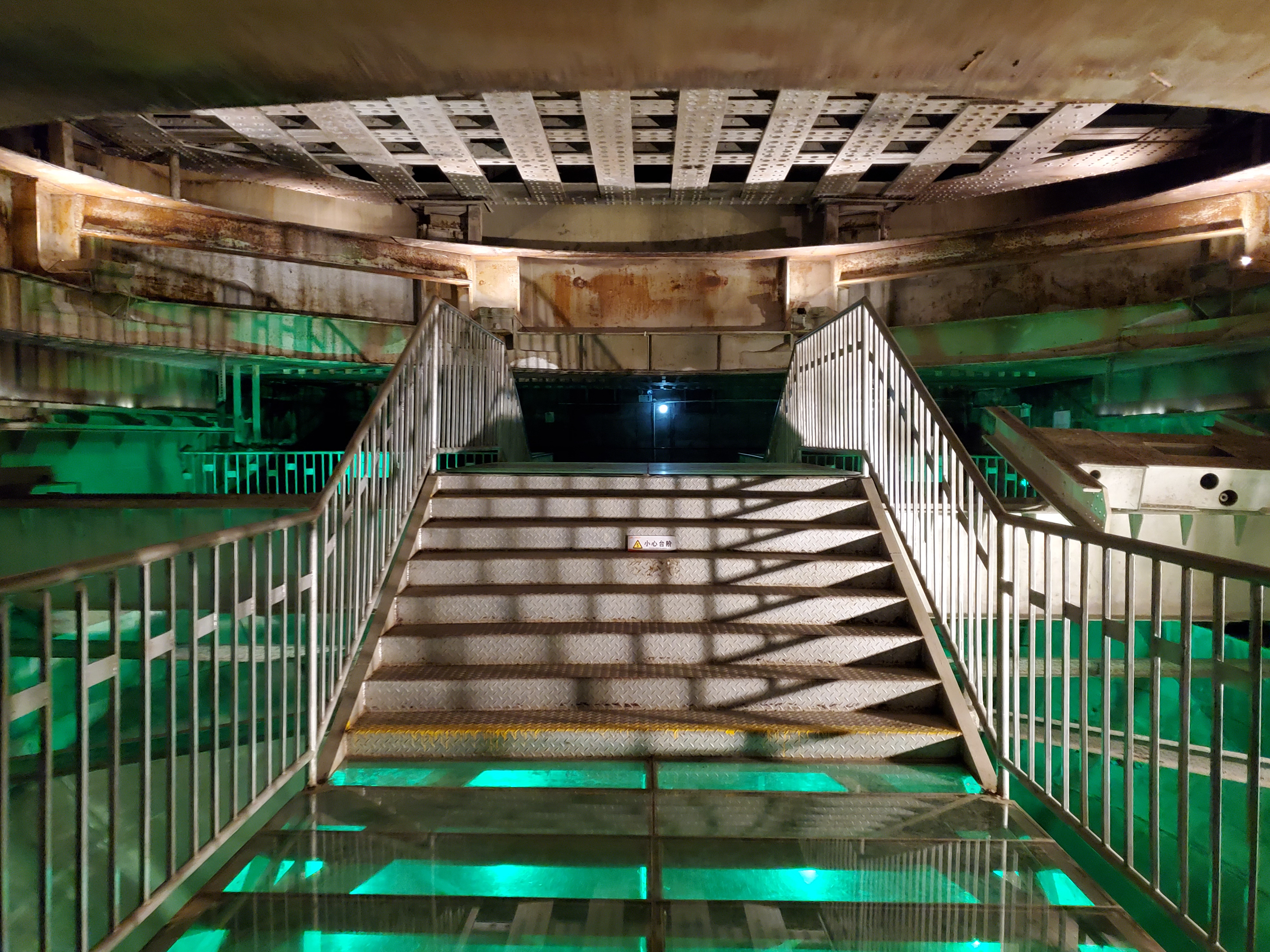
Interior of the military plant

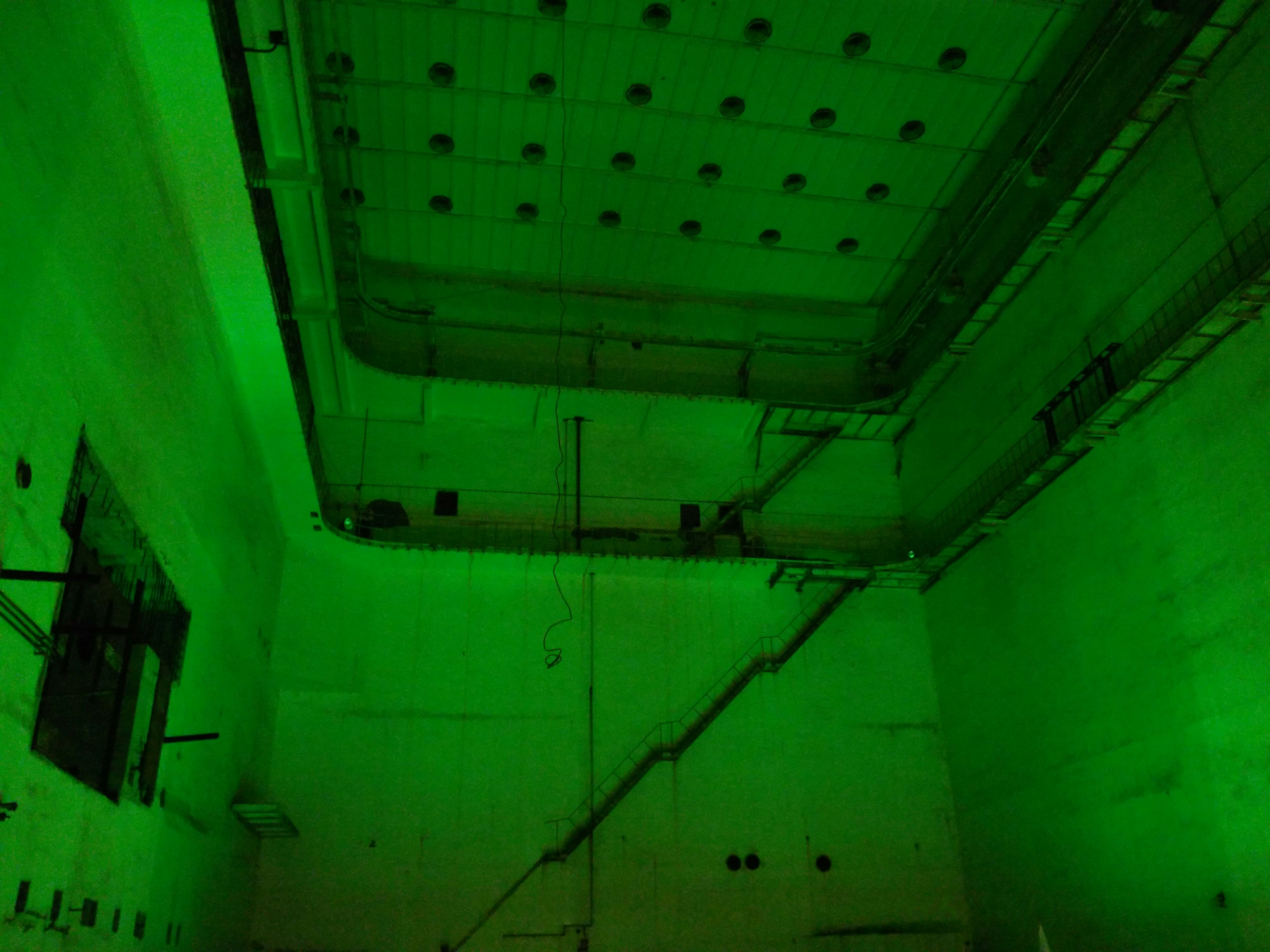
The large reactor hall inside the complex

816 Nuclear Military Plant (simplified Chinese: 816地下核工厂; traditional Chinese: 816地下核工廠) is an unfinished Chinese underground nuclear weapons production facility and the largest man-made tunnel structure in the world. A military megaproject, the nuclear base is located near what is now suburban Fuling, a municipality in Chongqing, China. In 2010, it was opened to Chinese tourists. It is a distinct network of nuclear-weapons manufacturing tunnels to the likewise defunct Underground Project 131 and the still operational "Underground Great Wall of China."

== History ==
The project was started in 1966 as part of China's Third Front campaign when Sino-Soviet relations dramatically declined (see also the Sino-Soviet split). To enhance China's national defence and prevent possible Soviet invasion and nuclear attack, the project was approved (directly by then-Premier Zhou Enlai) and undertaken in secret. More than 60,000 engineering soldiers of the People's Liberation Army participated in the construction of the base. The underground base was designed to be able to tolerate thousands of tons of TNT explosives and 8-magnitude earthquakes.

The project was under construction for 17 years, and the construction was nearly completed in 1984. In 1964 China made its first public nuclear test. Largely due to change in the Cold War international situation, the project was cancelled in February 1984. It was further declassified in April 2002. In April 2010, after being closed for over 25 years, the base was opened to tourists.

== Structure ==
The surface area of the cave is more than 104,000 m^{2}, and the total length of the tunnels is more than 20 kilometers. The whole complex consists of 13 levels, 18 artificial caves linked to each other, and has more than 80 roads and 130 tunnels. Automobiles are able to pass the roads and tunnels inside. The base has the “World's Largest Artificial Cave”, which has a height of 79.6 meters, roughly equal to that of a 20-floor building.

== See also ==
- Fallout shelter
- Underground City (Beijing)
- Nuclear warfare
- Nuclear deterrent
- Nuclear strategy
