= Coal Glen mine disaster =

1925 industrial disaster in North Carolina

Coordinates: 35.5578°N 79.2089°W

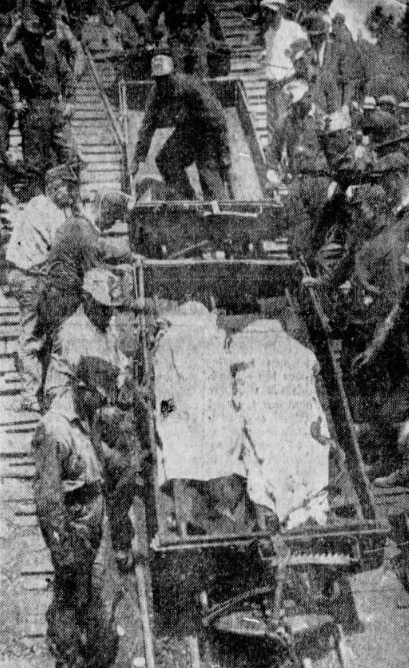
- Rescue workers cart out two bodies from the Coal Glen mine, May 27, 1925
- Date: May 27, 1925
- Time: Approximately 9:30 a.m.
- Location: Coal Glen, North Carolina, United States
- Type: Mining accident
- Cause: Dust cloud ignited by blasting charge
- Deaths: 53
- Injuries: 1

The Coal Glen mine disaster was a series of explosions that occurred on May 27, 1925, at a coal mine in Coal Glen, Chatham County, North Carolina, United States. At least 53 miners died in the explosions, making it the deadliest industrial disaster in North Carolina's history. The incident also partly contributed to North Carolina's adoption of a workers' compensation law several years later.

The Coal Glen mine was opened by the Carolina Coal Company in North Carolina's Deep River Coal Field in about 1921. Though equipped with a ventilation system, signs of firedamp buildup were observed the day before the disaster. On the morning of May 27, 1925, three explosions occurred in the mine. The first explosion killed all underground workers and their team of mules, while the subsequent blasts injured the mine superintendent and temporarily blocked the shaft with debris. Recovery efforts were led by State Adjutant-General John Van Bokkelen Metts and a group of engineers, with additional support offered by the United States Bureau of Mines and civic groups from the nearby city of Sanford. Local authorities confirmed at least 53 men were killed, but the actual death toll may be higher.

State and federal investigators later concluded that the first explosion was caused by an improperly set blasting charge which blew out a dust cloud that subsequently ignited. The disaster left 38 women widowed and 79 children fatherless. The mine was permanently closed in 1953 and later flooded. A state historical marker commemorating the event was dedicated in 2017.

== Background ==
1923 map of the Deep River Coal Field

The Deep River Coal Field is the largest coal deposit in North Carolina. Geologists believe that local residents made use of the coal as early as the 1770s. Commercial exploitation of the coal field began in the 1850s, with mines dug near the settlement of Egypt (renamed Cumnock in 1895) which were connected to the Cape Fear River port of Fayetteville by rail. In about 1921 the Carolina Coal Company dug a mine on the former location of the village of Farmville near the village of Coal Glen and about eight miles northwest of the city of Sanford.

The Coal Glen mine was developed as a slope mine with an entrance which descended below the ground at an incline. Interior passages were held up by four-foot-tall hardwood timbers. Most miners crawled through the mine, with few places where they could stand upright. Carts were hauled up and down the main slope by a powered hoist. Down in the mine, mules which were kept in an underground stable were used to move carts. Coal would be placed onto the carts which were brought to the surface to a tipple, where the coal would be sorted and separated from slate and loaded onto railway cars. By 1923, the mine was producing 200 tons per day.

The Coal Glen mine attracted rats. Workers observed them for signs of danger, similar to canaries used in other digs; if rats vacated the mine, miners viewed this as a sign of a natural gas buildup. The site was equipped with a ventilation system meant to diffuse any gas buildup. On the morning of May 26, 1925, one miner noticed that rats were fleeing the mine shaft. Fearing danger, he and several workers quit. That day one worker was weakened by coal dust and firedamp, possibly indicating ventilation problems with the mine. The superintendent was verbally informed of this.

== Explosions ==
A shift began as normal at 7:00 a.m. on May 27, 1925 at the Coal Glen mine. At about 9:30 a.m., an explosion erupted. The blast, likely caused by coal dust or natural gas, killed all workers underground at the time and was felt in the nearby town. Mine superintendent Howard Butler saw smoke coming through a ventilation fan at the surface, and took mechanic Joe Richardson down the main slope to investigate. They found six men lying unconscious behind a door to one of the passages and carried them outside. Butler then instructed surface workers to close the mine's blast door and ventured further into the mine with Richardson. At about 9:55, when they were 150 feet into the mine, a second explosion occurred, showering them with debris and injuring Butler. The two crawled back to the surface before a final explosion occurred at about 10:10. The third explosion collapsed part of the shaft, blocking passage in and out of the mine.

== Response and effects ==
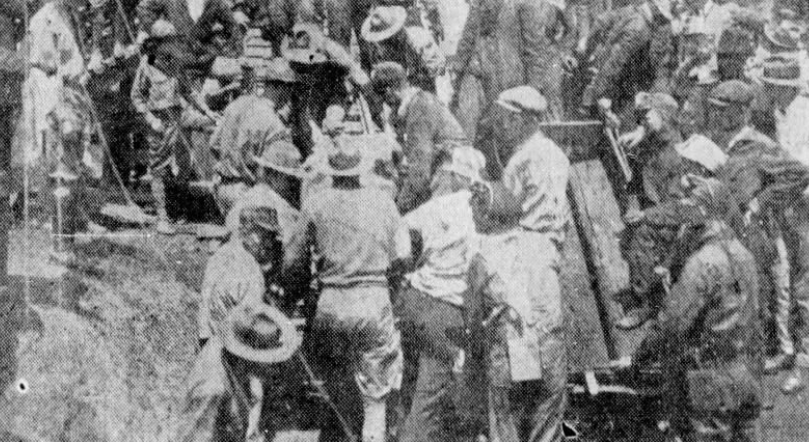
Rescue workers at the entrance of the mine working to recover bodies

Rescue efforts were undertaken shortly after the third explosion in the Coal Glen mine by workers from the nearby Cumnock operation. The day of the disaster, the United States Bureau of Mines dispatched a railway car from Thomas, West Virginia carrying special rescue equipment to North Carolina. It arrived in Coal Glen the following day. North Carolina Governor Angus Wilton McLean ordered troops from Fort Bragg to control the gathering crowd at the site and authorized rescue equipment to be flown into Sanford. Rescue efforts were led by State Adjutant-General John Van Bokkelen Metts and a group of engineers. Civic organizations from Sanford helped establish a first aid station at the mine surface. Recovery efforts ceased in the evening of May 30.

The Chatham County recorder of deeds issued 53 death certificates in relation to the event, but the real death total is not known. About 70 miners were working the shift, and contemporary newspaper reports offered higher counts. Local publications reported that several bodies were recovered in the months after the explosion and quietly buried. Seven workers scheduled for the shift were not present at the time of the explosion. Researcher Forest Hazel wrote that since many of the men working in the mines were unmarried, it is possible that some were not identified as missing. About half the men killed were white, the others black. Several mules were also killed in the explosion, and their remains were left underground.

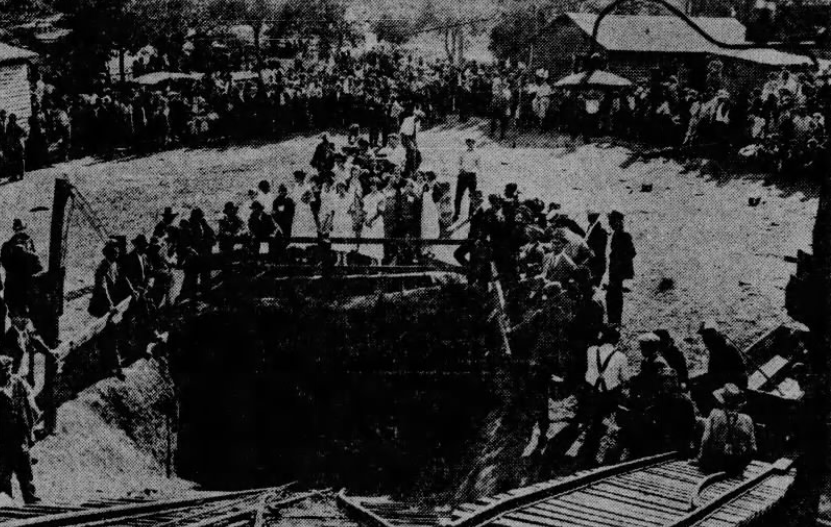
Miners' family members, rescue workers, and journalists circle around the mine entrance shortly after the disaster

Federal and state investigators and the management of the Carolina Coal Company all sought to discover the cause of the explosions. Bureau of Mines investigators determined that the explosions were caused by a blasting charge. Two charges had been set, and one failed to fully detonate. The single functional charge was not strong enough to collapse the coal rock; it instead blew out the contents of the drill hole in which it had been placed and scattered dust that was subsequently ignited. The state investigation was conducted by the office of the Commissioner of Labor, which was responsible for all mine inspections in the state. The state affirmed the conclusions of the federal investigation while further stating that the blasting charges had been improperly placed in violation of the state's mining regulations. Carolina Coal Company board member Bion Butler did not believe that gas was a factor in the blast.

Due to the deaths from the disaster, the adult population of Coal Glen shrunk by about half, while 38 women were widowed and 79 children were rendered fatherless. McLean asked the public to raise $35,000 in relief funds and requested the American Red Cross to provide assistance to victims. Upset with this limited response, a delegation from the city of Sanford went to Raleigh to meet with him, and convinced him to appoint a committee to coordinate a statewide fundraising campaign and offer advice to the Red Cross. John R. McQueen, the president of the Carolina Coal Company, placed the corporation into receivership and arranged for payouts to the impacted families. No lawsuits were filed against the company in connection to the disaster.

== Legacy ==
The Coal Glen mine explosion was the deadliest industrial disaster in North Carolina history. In part due to the disaster, the North Carolina General Assembly passed a workers' compensation law in 1929 with the encouragement of the Department of Labor. The Carolina Coal Company went bankrupt in 1930, but the mine was reopened in 1943 and remained in operation until 1953. The shaft was later flooded by the Deep River, and the mine entrance sits on land owned by the General Timber Corporation. A state historical marker commemorating the event was dedicated in 2017 at US 15/US 501 and Walter Bright Road. In April 2025, the Heart of Deep River Historical Society presented an exhibition about the disaster at Cumnock Union Church.

== Works cited ==
- Chapman, James H. (2017). The Deep River Coalfield: Two Hundred Years of Mining in Chatham County, North Carolina. McFarland & Company. ISBN 9781476668987.
- Hairr, John (2017). Coal Mine Disasters of North Carolina. Arcadia Publishing. ISBN 9781439659236.
- Hazel, Forest (2017). ""They Don't Dig for Coal Here Anymore" North Carolina's Coal Glen Mine". Southern Cultures. 23 (3): 62–69, 136. doi:10.1353/scu.2017.0029. S2CID 149399625.
