= Underground Great Wall of China =

Hidden infrastructure housing hundreds of Chinese ICBMs

The Underground Great Wall of China (Chinese: 地下长城; pinyin: Dìxià Chángchéng) is the informal name for the 3,000 mile (5,000 km) system of tunnels used by China to store and transport intercontinental ballistic missiles (ICBMs).

== Description ==
Due to the great secrecy surrounding the tunnels, little information about them is publicly available. The tunnels allow for mobile ICBMs to be shuttled around to different silos by truck and rail, and possibly stored in reinforced underground bunkers. This greatly enhances the ICBM's chance of survival in a direct nuclear strike, which enables their use in a second strike unlike ICBMs based in static nuclear silos which are susceptible to a direct nuclear attack.

A 2011 report written by a Georgetown University team led by Phillip Karber conducted a three-year study mapping out China's complex tunnel system, which stretches 5,000 km (3,000 miles). The report determined that the size of the Chinese nuclear arsenal is understated and as many as 3,000 nuclear warheads may be stored in the tunnel network. This hypothetical maximum storage or basing capacity along with Karber's own suggestions on fissile material, resulted in Western media purporting that 3,000 warheads were actually in the facility. The Karber study went on to state that the tunnels are not likely to be breached by conventional or low-yield earth-penetrating nuclear weapons such as the B61-11.

== See also ==
- 816 Nuclear Military Plant
- Underground Project 131
- Iranian underground missile bases
- Underground Great Wall
- Great Wall of China
- Great Wall of Sand
- Great Green Wall of China
