= Farmville, Chatham County, North Carolina =

Farmville, North Carolina
- Populated place
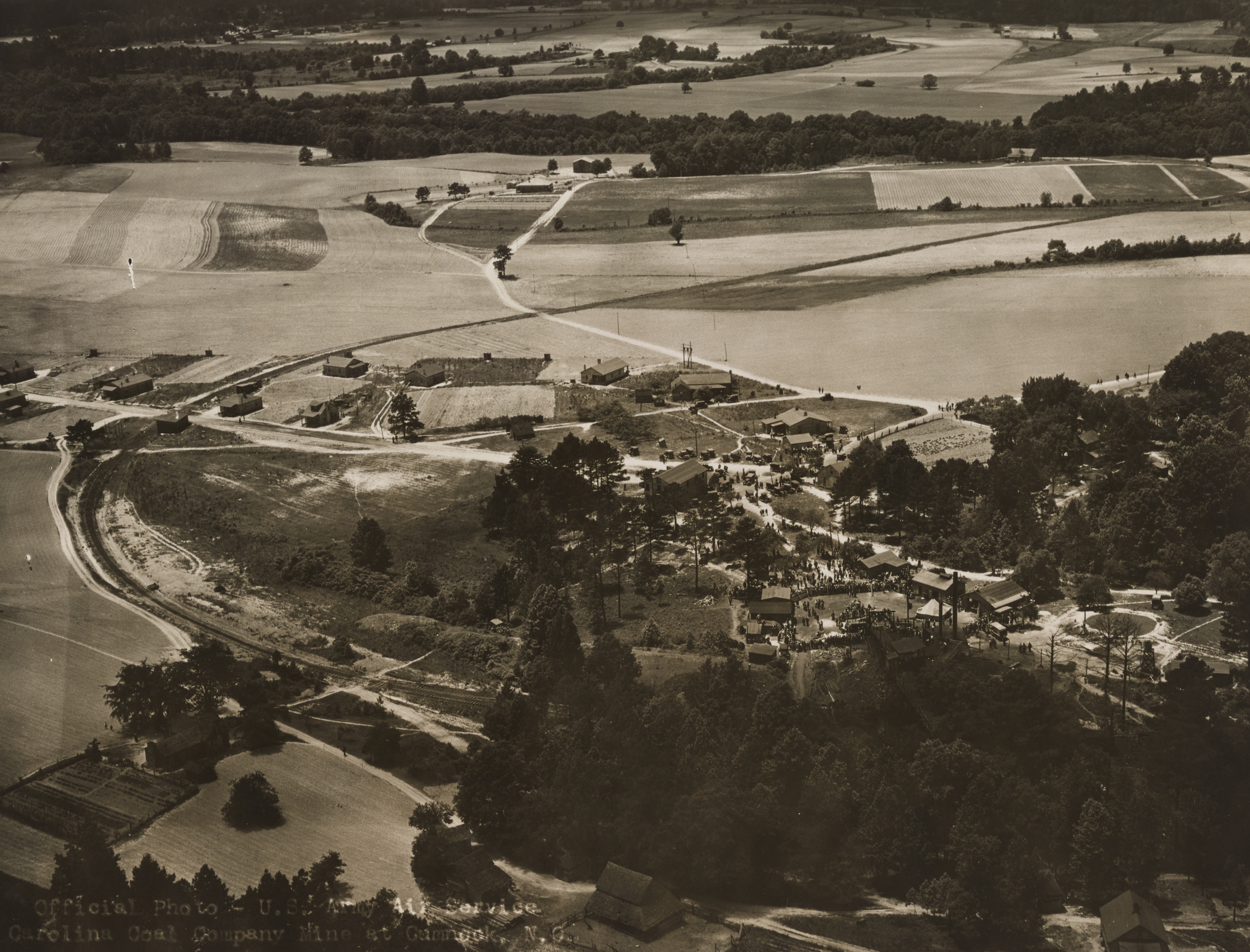
- Coal Glen in 1925
- Interactive map of Farmville, North Carolina
- Coordinates: 35°34′15″N 79°13′12″W
- Country: United States
- State: North Carolina
- County: Chatham
- Elevation: 282 ft (86 m)
- Time zone: UTC-5 (Eastern (EST))
  - Summer (DST): UTC-4 (EDT)
- ZIP code: 27330
- Area code: 919
- GNIS feature ID: 1020221

Farmville is a community in southeastern Chatham County, North Carolina, United States, which was once called Coal Glen. The area was the site of coal mining activities from the 18th century up the mid-1950s, and was the site of the 1925 Coal Glen mine disaster.

By the time of the 1925 disaster, the town consisted of several homes and a company store.

The Deep River coal field, 12 miles (19 km) long, included the Coal Glen and Egypt (Cumnock) mines.

A historical marker noting the mine disaster was dedicated June 3, 2017 at Farmville Community Church at U.S. 15-501 and Walter Bright Road north of Sanford.

== Geography ==
Farmville is located at latitude 35|34|15|N| and longitude 79|13|12|W. The elevation is 282 feet (86 m).
