= Underground Project 131 =

Underground tunnel system in Hubei province, China

Coordinates: 29°50′46″N 114°28′33″E

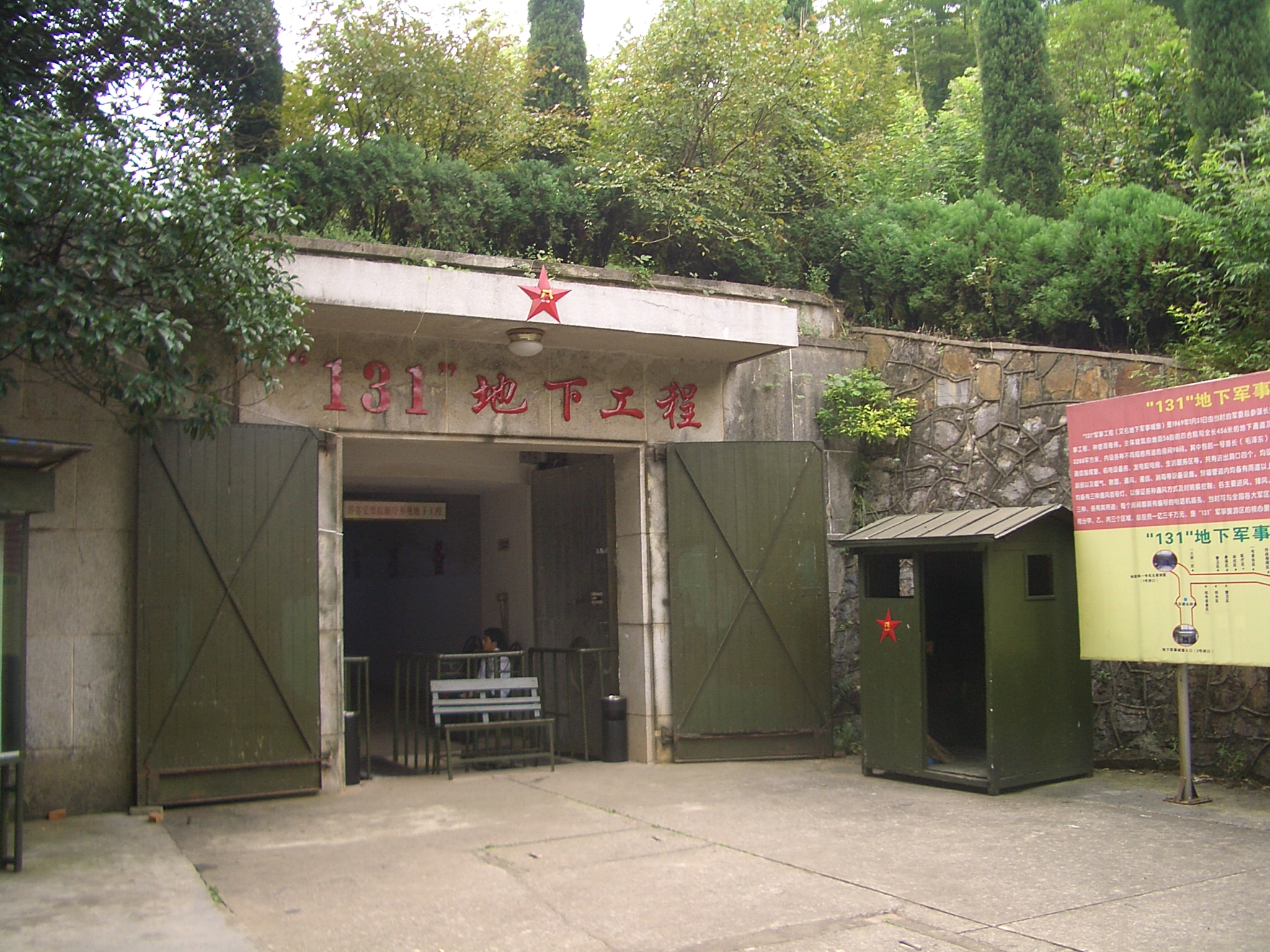
Entryway

Underground Project 131 (Chinese: "131"地下工程; pinyin: "131" Dìxià gōngchéng) is a system of tunnels in Hubei province constructed in the late 1960s and the early 1970s to accommodate the Chinese People's Liberation Army command headquarters in case of a nuclear war. The facility was never fully completed or used, and is currently open to visitors as a tourist attraction.

Some of the signage at the site refers to the facility as Chengshuidong Tourist Area (澄水洞旅游区).

== Location ==
The Project 131 site is located in the town of Gaoqiao (高桥镇) of the Xian'an District of the Xianning prefecture-level city in Hubei Province.

It is about 15 km east of Xianning urban area, and 80 km south of central Wuhan.

== History ==
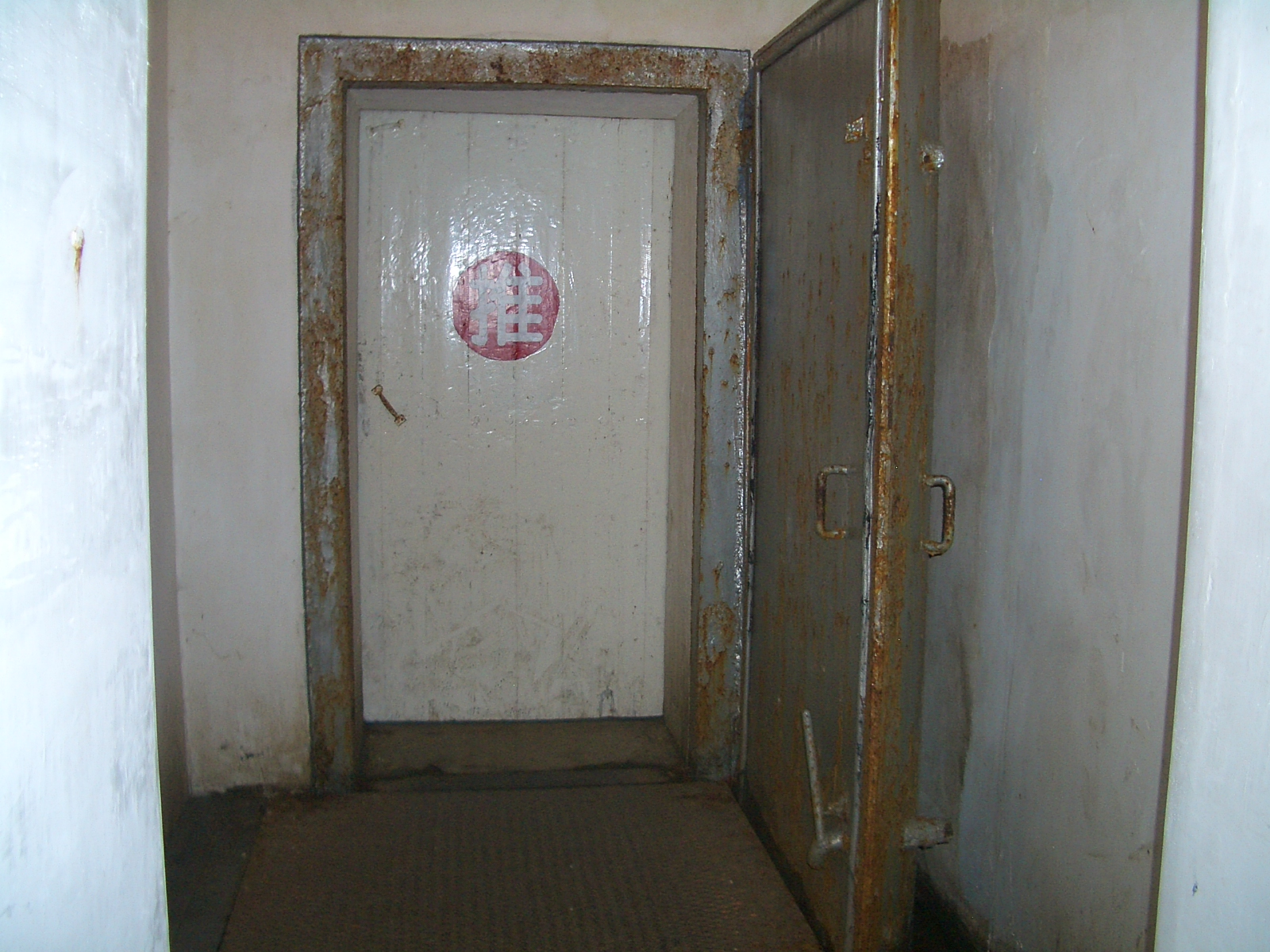
Doors in the tunnel near the entry

With the increase of tensions between China and the Soviet Union in the late 1960s, the Chinese leaders deemed it prudent to construct a number of underground facilities to protect the country's population, military, as well as its command and control bodies, in case of a nuclear conflict. The best known of these facilities is Beijing's Underground City.

On January 31, 1969, a decision was made to construct an underground command headquarters for the country's military; the codename "131" for the project stems from this date, 01–31. The Chief of Staff of the People's Liberation Army General Staff Department, General Huang Yongsheng (黄永胜) himself was in charge of the construction.

A system of tunnels with meeting rooms, offices for the top commanders (including the Commander in Chief, Mao Zedong and the second in command, Lin Biao), communication center, etc., were constructed under one of the hills in the area, and villas for Mao Zedong and Lin Biao were built on the surface. However, after the death of Lin Biao and the arrest of Huang Yongsheng in September 1971, the project was terminated, and it never saw its intended use. Neither Mao nor Lin Biao ever actually visited the site.

The tunnel system is reported to be 456 meters long, and has cost 130 million yuan to construct.

== Present state ==
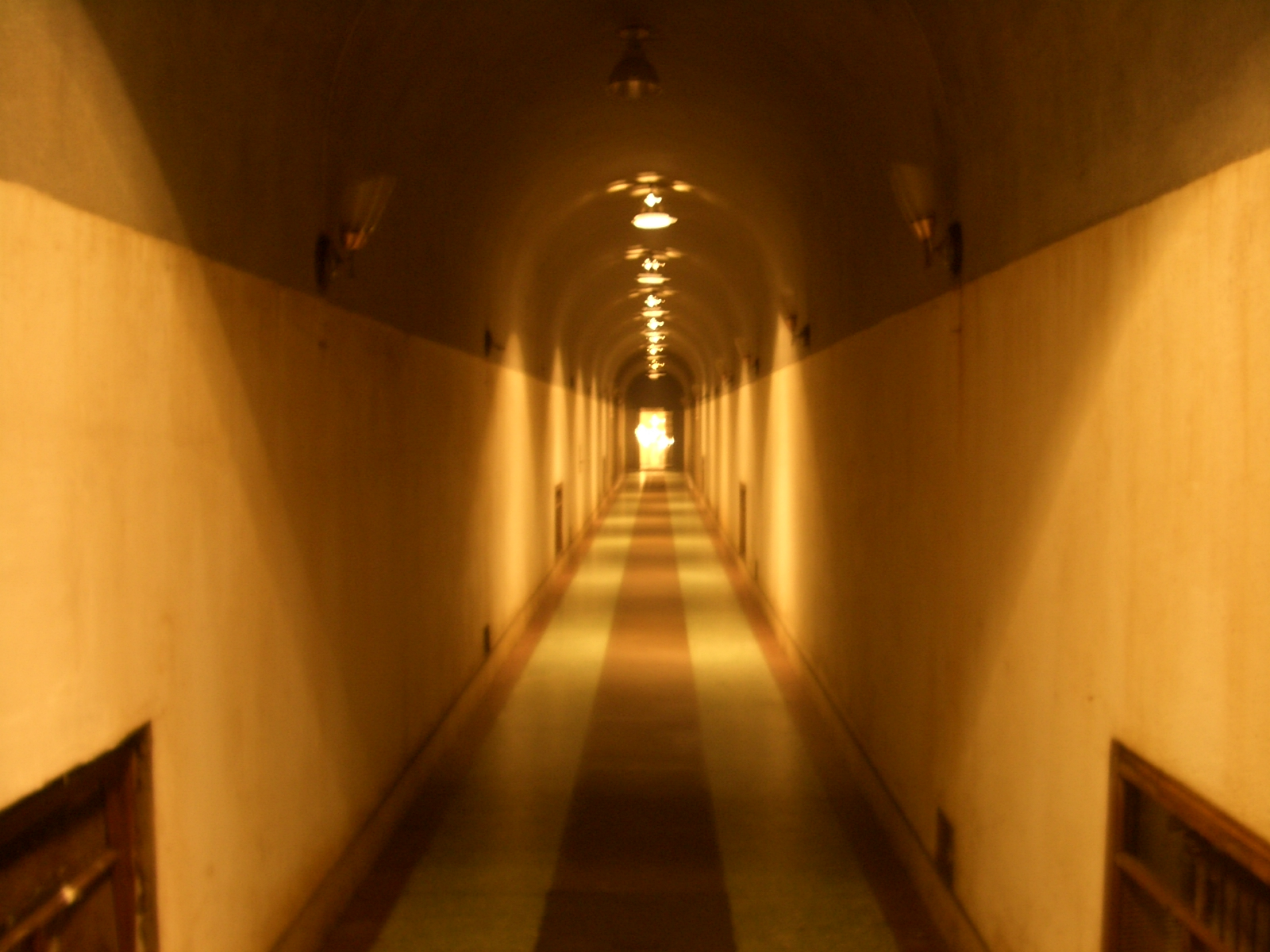
In a tunnel

In 1981, the Project 131 site was turned over to the civilian authorities of the prefecture-level city of Xianning, where it is located. An upscale hotel and conference facility was created above the ground, while the tunnel system was turned into a tourist attraction. At present (summer 2008), the underground rooms were mostly bare, decorated with signs describing the purported use of each room, an occasional piece of period furniture, and a few maps dealing with China's military history. There are also some exhibits (Mao badges, posters, etc.) in the pavilions on the surface. Unlike the pavilions and villas, the tunnel is still considered a military project and therefore closed to non-Chinese visitors (April 2009).

Huang Yongsheng's grave is also on the site.

== See also ==
- Regional seat of government (UK)
- Third Front, the PRC's general home-defense strategy
- Metro-2
- Stalin's bunker, Samara
- Heng Shan Military Command Center
- 816 Nuclear Military Plant
- Underground Great Wall of China
