= Meteo (film) =

1989 Hungarian science-fiction art film

- Directed by: András Mész
- Written by: András Mész; Géza Bereményi
- Produced by: Pál Sándor
- Starring: Károly Eperjes; Zoltán Szilágyi Varga; Cecília Lathe; Géza Balkay; Vilmos Vajdai
- Edited by: Gábor Szabó
- Music by: Another John, Tibor Szemző
- Production company: Hunnia Filmstúdió
- Release date: 22 February 1990 (Hungary)
- Running time: 98 minutes
- Country: Hungary
- Language: Hungarian

Meteo is a 1990 Hungarian science-fiction art film directed by András Mész. Underground tunnel scenes were shot in the Kőbánya cellar system, Budapest and the factory scenes were shot in the Kőbánya brewery (now part of the Dreher Breweries). The film quickly gained cult status in Hungary after its release.

== Cast ==
- Judit László - Miss Piggy
- Péter Geltz - Wolf
- Károly Eperjes - Berlioz
- László Kistamás - Eckerman
- Zoltán Varga - Verõ
- János Derzsi - Fugitive Man
- Dorottya Horváth - Waitress
- Denisa Dér - Refugee girl
- Fajer Khaled - Arab Girl
- Szabolcs Szilágyi - Gangster Boss
- András Novák - Gangster Boss
- Béla Unger - Bodyguard
- János Csányi - Bodyguard
- Tibor Gazdag - Bodyguard
- Géza Balkay - Police Superintendent

== Festivals ==
The film was presented at the following festival:

- 9 February 1990: Berlin International Film Festival, Germany
- 1990: Budapest Hungarian Film Festival
- 1990: Setúbal FESTROIA International Film Festival

== Awards ==
The film won the following awards:

- Best film, 1991 FilmFestival Cottbus
- Award of the Brandenburg Minister of Culture, 1991 FilmFestival Cottbus
- Best Performance Award for László Zsótér, 1990 Budapest Hungarian Film Festival, Budapest
- Award for Students of the College of Theater and Film Arts for Cinematographer Gábor Szabó, 1990 Budapest Hungarian Film Festival, Budapest
- FIPRESCI award, 1990 Setúbal FESTROIA International Film Festival
