= Météo =

Météo may refer to:

- Weather in French
- Météo-France, the French national meteorological service
- MétéoMédia, a 24-hour Canadian French-language cable television specialty channel and web site
- Météo Suisse, officially the Federal Office of Meteorology and Climatology, an office of the federal administration of Switzerland
- Météo+, a Canadian television sitcom
- Miss Météo, a Canadian Quebec French-language television series
