= Slope mining =

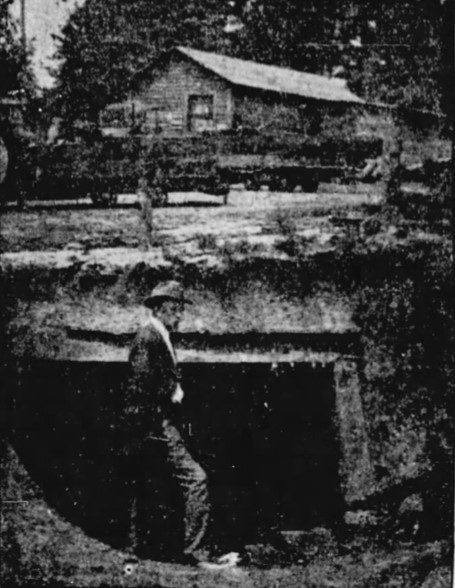
Entrance to the Carolina Coal Company's slope mine in Coal Glen, North Carolina, 1923

Slope mining is a method of accessing valuable geological material, such as coal or ore. A sloping access shaft travels downwards towards the desired material. Slope mines differ from shaft and drift mines, which access resources by tunneling straight down or horizontally, respectively. In slope mining, the primary access to the mine is on an incline. Mine hoists may still be used to raise and lower loads on the incline if it is steep, but on shallower slopes, conveyor belts, locomotives or trucks may do the work. Drainage and ventilation of slope mines may be done using the primary slope, or it may be done using auxiliary shafts or bore-holes.

== See also ==
- 2010 Copiapo mining accident
- San Jose Mine
