= List of tallest structures in Hungary =

This is a list of the tallest buildings and structures in Hungary.

== Tallest buildings ==
Name	City	Height m (ft)	Floors	Year built	Use	Note
Pécs TV Tower	Pécs	197 m (646 ft)	55	1973	Restaurant, viewpoint	Tallest building in Hungary since 1973.
MOL Campus	Budapest	143 m (469 ft)	28	2022	Office	Tallest office building nearly reaching the height of a skyscraper (150m).
St. Adalbert's Basilica	Esztergom	100 m (330 ft)	-	1822-1869	Cathedral	From the crypt to the top.
Hungarian Parliament Building	Budapest	96 m (315 ft)	-	1903	Governmental building	-
Saint Stephen's Basilica	Budapest	96 m (315 ft)	-	1905	Cathedral	-
Semmelweis University tower	Budapest	88 m (289 ft)	23	1976	University	Tallest educational building in Hungary.
Magasház ("tall house")	Pécs	84 m (276 ft)	25	1976	Residential	Uninhabited after 1989. Demolished in 2016.
Szent László Church	Budapest	83 m (272 ft)	-	1894-1900	Church	-
Roman Catholic Church of Bátaszék	Bátaszék	82 m (269 ft)	-	1899-1902	Church	-
Votive Church of Szeged	Szeged	81 m (266 ft)	-	1913-1930	Cathedral	-
Residential	Szolnok	81 m (266 ft)	24	1975	Residential	Tallest residential building in Hungary.
Church of Rózsák Square	Budapest	76 m (249 ft)	-	1895-1901	Church	-
Residential	Debrecen	75 m (246 ft)	22	1969-1973	Residential	Tallest residential building in Hajdu-Bihar county.
Great Church of Kecskemét	Kecskemét	75 m (246 ft)	-	1774-1806	Church	-
Matthias Church	Budapest	74 m (243 ft)	-	1874-1896	Cathedral	-
NyFI Tower (National Pension Insurance)	Budapest	73 m (240 ft)	20	1968-1973	Governmental building	-
Great Reformed Church of Nagykőrös	Nagykőrös	73 m (240 ft)	-	1907	Church	Tallest Calvinist church in Hungary.
Saint Stephen's Church	Pápa	72 m (236 ft)	-	1774-1786	Church	-
Budapest Water Company HQ	Budapest	71 m (233 ft)	14	1978-1980	Office	Demolished in 2019.
Church of Saint Peter and Saint Paul	Esztergom	70 m (230 ft)	-	1756–1762	Church	-
Residential tower	Gyöngyös	70 m (230 ft)	20	1970s	Residential	-
Great Lutheran Church of Békéscsaba	Békéscsaba	70 m (230 ft)	-	1807-1824	Church	Tallest Lutheran church in Hungary.
Újpalota tower	Budapest	68 m (223 ft)	18	1970s	Residential	Tallest residential building in Budapest.
BOH office building	Budapest	68 m (223 ft)	15	2026	Office	-
Schönherz Dormitory (BME)	Budapest	67 m (220 ft)	20	1981	University	-
Szent Ferenc Church	Budapest	67 m (220 ft)	-	1865-1879	Church	-
Kalocsa Cathedral	Kalocsa	65 m (213 ft)	-	1735-1774	Cathedral	-
Agora Tower	Budapest	65 m (213 ft)	16	2020	Office	Tallest office building (until MOL Campus is under construction).
Europa Tower	Budapest	64 m (210 ft)	17	2005	Office	-
Hotel Budapest	Budapest	64 m (210 ft)	19	1967	Hotel	-
Tower block	Miskolc	63 m (207 ft)	20	-	Residential	-
Reformed Church of Dévaványa	Dévaványa	63 m (207 ft)	-	-	Church	-
Pick Tower	Szeged	63 m (207 ft)	-	-	Office	-
Szombathely Cathedral	Szombathely	63 m (207 ft)	-	1791-1806	Cathedral	-
Duna Tower	Budapest	62 m (203 ft)	16	2005	Office	-
Tower block	Veszprém	62 m (203 ft)	18	-	Office	-
Szent Márton Church	Kunszentmárton	62 m (203 ft)	-	1781-1784	Church	-
Downtown Catholic Church	Békéscsaba	61 m (200 ft)	-	1910	Church	-
Protestant Great Church of Debrecen	Debrecen	61 m (200 ft)	-	1803-1823	Church	-
Residential tower	Debrecen	60 m (200 ft)	17	1977	Residential	-
Hungarian Police HQ ("Police Palace")	Budapest	60 m (200 ft)	17	1995	Police building	93 m with antenna.
Pécs Cathedral	Pécs	60 m (200 ft)	-	1891	Cathedral	-
Church of Máriapócs	Máriapócs	60 m (200 ft)	-	1731-1749	church	-
Rákóczi Tower	Nagykálló	60 m (200 ft)	-	1710-1733	Belfry	-
City Hall of Győr	Győr	58 m (190 ft)	-	1896-1898	City hall	-
Fire Tower	Sopron	58 m (190 ft)	-	1290-1340	Fire tower	-
Catholic Church of Törökszentmiklós	Törökszentmiklós	58 m (190 ft)	-	1898-1900	Church	-
many lower buildings

== Tallest structures ==
Name	Location	Height (m)	Structural type	Year built	Coordinates	Note
Lakihegy Radio Tower	Szigetszentmiklós - Lakihegy	314	Guyed mast	1933, 1968	47°22′23.45″N 19°0′17.21″E	insulated against ground, 287 according to the Aviation Office.
Solt Radio Tower	Solt	304	Guyed mast	1977	46°50′3.61″N 19°1′53.54″E	insulated against ground
Chimney of AES Tisza II Power Plant	Tiszaújváros	250	Chimney (concrete)	1974	47°55′0.6″N 21°4′34.1″E	-
Szentes TV Tower	Szentes	236.5m	Guyed mast	1960	46°37′25″N 20°16′54″E	
Kabhegy TV Mast	Úrkút	238	Guyed mast	-	47°2′56″N 17°39′13″E	
Penyige TV Tower	Penyige	217	guyed mast	?	47°59′55″N 22°35′12″E	
Újudvar TV Tower	Újudvar	206	concrete tower	?	46°33′47″N 17°1′8″E	
Chimney of Visonta Power Station	Visonta	203	Chimney (concrete)	-	47°47′18.6″N 20°4′1″E	
Chimney of Óbuda Power Plant	Budapest	203	Chimney (concrete)	-	47°33′51.2″N 19°2′15″E	
Chimneys of Dunamenti Power Station	Százhalombatta	202	Chimney ( concrete)	-	47°19′44.7″N 18°55′3.4″E ; 47°19′41.5″N 18°55′6.6″E ; 47°19′34.7″N 18°55′2.2″E	
Széchenyihegy TV Mast	Budapest	192	Guyed mast		47°29′30.6″N 18°58′44.2″E	
Komádi TV Tower	Komádi	180	Concrete tower		47°1′6″N 21°29′39″E	
Sopron TV Tower	Sopron	165	concrete tower		47°39′44″N 16°34′6″E	, nickname "Rakéta"
Csávoly TV Tower	Csávoly	165	guyed mast		46°11′49″N 19°8′59″E	
Kiskunfélegyháza TV Tower	Kiskunfélegyháza	160	Tower		46°41′22″N 19°49′48″E	
Chimney of Tatabánya Power Station	Tatabánya	159	Chimney	1972	47°33′37″N 18°25′36″E	
Szeged TV Tower	Szeged	159	Tower	1993	46°16′15″N 20°08′43″E	
Pallag TV tower	Debrecen	158	concrete tower		47°34′39″N 21°38′5″E	
Jászberény Shortwave Transmitter	Pusztamonostor	157	Guyed mast		47°34′36″N 19°50′26″E	
Jászberény Shortwave Transmitter	Pusztamonostor	157	Guyed mast		47°34′31″N 19°50′29″E	
Jászberény Shortwave Transmitter	Pusztamonostor	157	Guyed mast		47°33′54″N 19°50′19″E	
Jászberény Shortwave Transmitter	Pusztamonostor	157	Guyed mast		47°33′50″N 19°50′13″E	
Száva utca TV Tower	Budapest	154	concrete tower		47°28′7″N 19°7′32″E	
Miskolc Heating Power Station Chimney	Miskolc	152	Chimney		48°05′41″N 20°44′54″E	
Lövő Vestas V-90 Wind Turbine	Lövő	151	Wind Power Plant	2010	47°31′24″N 16°45′36″E	
Pápakovácsi Vestas V-90 Wind Turbine	Pápakovácsi	151	Wind Power Plant	2008	47°15′18″N 17°29′41″E	
Mosonmagyaróvár Wind Turbine	Mosonmagyaróvár	151	Wind Power Plant		47°53′43″N 17°14′59″E	
Mosonmagyaróvár Wind Turbine	Mosonmagyaróvár	151	Wind Power Plant		47°53′36″N 17°14′46″E	
Mosonmagyaróvár Wind Turbine	Mosonmagyaróvár	151	Wind Power Plant		47°53′30″N 17°14′28″E	
Kiskőrös TV Tower	Kiskőrös	150	concrete tower		46°37′2″N 19°18′59″E	
Bőny Wind Turbine	Bőny	150	Wind Power Plant		47°40′37″N 17°51′34″E	
Bőny Wind Turbine	Bőny	150	Wind Power Plant		47°39′55″N 17°51′42″E	
Bőny Wind Turbine	Bőny	150	Wind Power Plant		47°40′27″N 17°51′49″E	
Bőny Wind Turbine	Bőny	150	Wind Power Plant		47°40′40″N 17°51′59″E	
Bőny Wind Turbine	Bőny	150	Wind Power Plant		47°40′04″N 17°52′08″E	
Bőny Wind Turbine	Bőny	150	Wind Power Plant		47°40′14″N 17°52′18″E	
Bőny Wind Turbine	Bőny	150	Wind Power Plant		47°40′28″N 17°52′21″E	
Bőny Wind Turbine	Bőny	150	Wind Power Plant		47°40′13″N 17°52′50″E	
Bőny Wind Turbine	Bőny	150	Wind Power Plant		47°40′02″N 17°52′56″E	
Bőny Wind Turbine	Bőny	150	Wind Power Plant		47°39′48″N 17°52′56″E	
Bőny Wind Turbine	Bőny	150	Wind Power Plant		47°39′47″N 17°53′30″E	
Bőny Wind Turbine	Bőny	150	Wind Power Plant		47°39′36″N 17°53′43″E	
Bőny Wind Turbine	Bőny	150	Wind Power Plant		47°39′57″N 17°52′30″E	
Bana Wind Turbine	Bana	150	Wind Power Plant		47°41′07″N 17°56′11″E	
Csetény Wind Turbine	Csetény	150	Wind Power Plant		47°18′23″N 18°01′11″E	
Csetény Wind Turbine	Csetény	150	Wind Power Plant		47°18′05″N 18°01′29″E	
Mosonmagyaróvár Wind Turbine	Mosonmagyaróvár	150	Wind Power Plant		47°53′17″N 17°14′57″E	
Nagyveleg Wind Turbine	Nagyveleg	150	Wind Power Plant		47°20′26″N 18°06′22″E	
Mosonmagyaróvár Wind Turbine	Mosonmagyaróvár	150	Wind Power Plant		47°53′29″N 17°15′04″E	
Felsőzsolca Wind Turbine	Felsőzsolca	150	Wind Power Plant		48°05′52″N 20°54′27″E	
Bábolna Wind Turbine	Bábolna	150	Wind Power Plant		47°39′14″N 18°00′40″E	
Bábolna Wind Turbine	Bábolna	150	Wind Power Plant		47°39′19″N 18°00′18″E	
Bábolna Wind Turbine	Bábolna	150	Wind Power Plant		47°39′26″N 18°00′26″E	
Bábolna Wind Turbine	Bábolna	150	Wind Power Plant		47°39′34″N 18°00′34″E	
Bábolna Wind Turbine	Bábolna	150	Wind Power Plant		47°39′23″N 17°59′58″E	
Nagylózs Wind Turbine	Nagylózs	150	Wind Power Plant		47°34′23″N 16°45′30″E	
Bábolna Wind Turbine	Bábolna	150	Wind Power Plant		47°39′29″N 18°00′10″E	
Nagylózs Wind Turbine	Nagylózs	150	Wind Power Plant		47°34′14″N 16°45′15″E	
Bábolna Wind Turbine	Bábolna	150	Wind Power Plant		47°39′35″N 18°00′19″E	
Nagylózs Wind Turbine	Nagylózs	150	Wind Power Plant		47°33′56″N 16°44′51″E	
Nagylózs Wind Turbine	Nagylózs	150	Wind Power Plant		47°33′34″N 16°44′49″E	
Nagylózs Wind Turbine	Nagylózs	150	Wind Power Plant		47°33′37″N 16°45′10″E	
Nagylózs Wind Turbine	Nagylózs	150	Wind Power Plant		47°33′18″N 16°45′30″E	
Nagylózs Wind Turbine	Nagylózs	150	Wind Power Plant		47°32′57″N 16°45′39″E	
Nagylózs Wind Turbine	Nagylózs	150	Wind Power Plant		47°32′44″N 16°46′01″E	
Jánossomorja Wind Turbine	Jánossomorja	149	Wind Power Plant		47°48′31″N 17°09′10″E	
Mosonmagyaróvár Wind Turbine	Mosonmagyaróvár	149	Wind Power Plant		47°52′44″N 17°13′48″E	
Mosonmagyaróvár Wind Turbine	Mosonmagyaróvár	149	Wind Power Plant		47°52′38″N 17°13′59″E	
Mosonmagyaróvár Wind Turbine	Mosonmagyaróvár	149	Wind Power Plant		47°52′39″N 17°13′34″E	
Mosonmagyaróvár Wind Turbine	Mosonmagyaróvár	149	Wind Power Plant		47°52′32″N 17°13′19″E	
Mosonmagyaróvár Wind Turbine	Mosonmagyaróvár	149	Wind Power Plant		47°52′28″N 17°13′30″E	
Jánossomorja Wind Turbine	Jánossomorja	148	Wind Power Plant		47°48′21″N 17°08′54″E	
Jánossomorja Wind Turbine	Jánossomorja	148	Wind Power Plant		47°48′43″N 17°08′40″E	
Jánossomorja Wind Turbine	Jánossomorja	148	Wind Power Plant		47°48′58″N 17°08′47″E	
Jánossomorja Wind Turbine	Jánossomorja	148	Wind Power Plant		47°48′44″N 17°08′59″E	
Jánossomorja Wind Turbine	Jánossomorja	148	Wind Power Plant		47°48′27″N 17°08′34″E	
Chimney of Újpest Power Plant	Budapest	147	Chimney		47°33′12″N 19°06′08″E	
Chimney of Kelenföldi erőmű	Budapest	147	Chimney		47°27′46″N 19°03′18″E	
Balatonszabadi transmitter	Balatonszabadi	145	guyed mast		46°55′18.4″N 18°6′49.7″E	, insulated against ground
Nagyigmánd Wind Turbine	Nagyigmánd	145	Wind Power Plant		47°38′07″N 18°08′57″E	
Nagyigmánd Wind Turbine	Nagyigmánd	145	Wind Power Plant		47°38′23″N 18°08′58″E	
Nagyigmánd Wind Turbine	Nagyigmánd	145	Wind Power Plant		47°38′09″N 18°09′17″E	
Csém Wind Turbine	Csém	145	Wind Power Plant		47°40′35″N 18°04′06″E	
Csém Wind Turbine	Csém	145	Wind Power Plant		47°40′46″N 18°03′57″E	
Csém Wind Turbine	Csém	145	Wind Power Plant		47°40′55″N 18°04′11″E	
Csém Wind Turbine	Csém	145	Wind Power Plant		47°41′08″N 18°03′51″E	
Csém Wind Turbine	Csém	145	Wind Power Plant		47°40′56″N 18°03′47″E	
Csém Wind Turbine	Csém	145	Wind Power Plant		47°40′39″N 18°04′25″E	
Ikervár Wind Turbine	Ikervár	145	Wind Power Plant		47°12′19″N 16°51′21″E	
Ikervár Wind Turbine	Ikervár	145	Wind Power Plant		47°11′40″N 16°51′50″E	
Ikervár Wind Turbine	Ikervár	145	Wind Power Plant		47°11′20″N 16°51′37″E	
Ikervár Wind Turbine	Ikervár	145	Wind Power Plant		47°11′19″N 16°52′15″E	
Ikervár Wind Turbine	Ikervár	145	Wind Power Plant		47°11′18″N 16°52′40″E	
Ikervár Wind Turbine	Ikervár	145	Wind Power Plant		47°12′02″N 16°51′44″E	
Ikervár Wind Turbine	Ikervár	145	Wind Power Plant		47°12′15″N 16°51′59″E	
Ikervár Wind Turbine	Ikervár	145	Wind Power Plant		47°12′16″N 16°52′22″E	
Ikervár Wind Turbine	Ikervár	145	Wind Power Plant		47°12′38″N 16°51′36″E	
Ikervár Wind Turbine	Ikervár	145	Wind Power Plant		47°12′38″N 16°52′05″E	
Ikervár Wind Turbine	Ikervár	145	Wind Power Plant		47°12′55″N 16°52′20″E	
Ikervár Wind Turbine	Ikervár	145	Wind Power Plant		47°13′03″N 16°51′47″E	
Ikervár Wind Turbine	Ikervár	145	Wind Power Plant		47°13′28″N 16°54′19″E	
Ikervár Wind Turbine	Ikervár	145	Wind Power Plant		47°13′19″N 16°54′42″E	
Ikervár Wind Turbine	Ikervár	145	Wind Power Plant		47°13′51″N 16°53′36″E	
Ikervár Wind Turbine	Ikervár	145	Wind Power Plant		47°13′13″N 16°53′24″E	
Ikervár Wind Turbine	Ikervár	145	Wind Power Plant		47°13′43″N 16°53′03″E	
Bana Wind Turbine	Bana	145	Wind Power Plant		47°40′18″N 17°55′52″E	
Bana Wind Turbine	Bana	145	Wind Power Plant		47°40′38″N 17°55′58″E	
Ács Wind Turbine	Ács	145	Wind Power Plant		47°41′11″N 17°58′12″E	
Ács Wind Turbine	Ács	145	Wind Power Plant		47°41′12″N 17°57′31″E	
Ács Wind Turbine	Ács	145	Wind Power Plant		47°40′59″N 17°57′14″E	
Ács Wind Turbine	Ács	145	Wind Power Plant		47°40′57″N 17°56′48″E	
Bábolna Wind Turbine	Bábolna	145	Wind Power Plant		47°39′59″N 17°59′36″E	
Bábolna Wind Turbine	Bábolna	145	Wind Power Plant		47°39′41″N 17°59′32″E	
Bábolna Wind Turbine	Bábolna	145	Wind Power Plant		47°39′55″N 17°59′55″E	
Bábolna Wind Turbine	Bábolna	145	Wind Power Plant		47°39′39″N 18°00′00″E	
Bábolna Wind Turbine	Bábolna	145	Wind Power Plant		47°40′02″N 18°00′19″E	
Bábolna Wind Turbine	Bábolna	145	Wind Power Plant		47°39′47″N 18°00′23″E	
Bábolna Wind Turbine	Bábolna	145	Wind Power Plant		47°39′44″N 18°00′44″E	
Bábolna Wind Turbine	Bábolna	145	Wind Power Plant		47°39′59″N 18°00′47″E	
Bábolna Wind Turbine	Bábolna	145	Wind Power Plant		47°40′03″N 18°01′13″E	
Bábolna Wind Turbine	Bábolna	145	Wind Power Plant		47°40′22″N 18°01′32″E	
Bábolna Wind Turbine	Bábolna	145	Wind Power Plant		47°40′30″N 18°01′48″E	
Csém Wind Turbine	Csém	145	Wind Power Plant		47°40′15″N 18°02′52″E	
Csém Wind Turbine	Csém	145	Wind Power Plant		47°39′54″N 18°02′57″E	
Bábolna Wind Turbine	Bábolna	145	Wind Power Plant		47°39′25″N 18°02′06″E	
Bábolna Wind Turbine	Bábolna	145	Wind Power Plant		47°39′05″N 18°02′19″E	
Bábolna Wind Turbine	Bábolna	145	Wind Power Plant		47°40′17″N 18°00′42″E	
Bábolna Wind Turbine	Bábolna	145	Wind Power Plant		47°40′35″N 18°00′42″E	
Bábolna Wind Turbine	Bábolna	145	Wind Power Plant		47°40′40″N 17°59′56″E	
Nagyigmánd Wind Turbine	Nagyigmánd	145	Wind Power Plant		47°38′24″N 18°07′26″E	
Nagyigmánd Wind Turbine	Nagyigmánd	145	Wind Power Plant		47°38′17″N 18°07′05″E	
Nagyigmánd Wind Turbine	Nagyigmánd	145	Wind Power Plant		47°38′09″N 18°07′49″E	
Nagyigmánd Wind Turbine	Nagyigmánd	145	Wind Power Plant		47°38′10″N 18°08′37″E	
Nagyigmánd Wind Turbine	Nagyigmánd	144	Wind Power Plant		47°36′53″N 18°07′00″E	
Nagyigmánd Wind Turbine	Nagyigmánd	144	Wind Power Plant		47°36′51″N 18°07′23″E	
Nagyigmánd Wind Turbine	Nagyigmánd	144	Wind Power Plant		47°36′36″N 18°07′15″E	
Nagyigmánd Wind Turbine	Nagyigmánd	144	Wind Power Plant		47°37′19″N 18°07′09″E	
Nagyigmánd Wind Turbine	Nagyigmánd	144	Wind Power Plant		47°40′01″N 18°05′17″E	
Nagyigmánd Wind Turbine	Nagyigmánd	144	Wind Power Plant		47°37′21″N 18°06′29″E	
Nagyigmánd Wind Turbine	Nagyigmánd	144	Wind Power Plant		47°40′10″N 18°05′04″E	
Nagyigmánd Wind Turbine	Nagyigmánd	144	Wind Power Plant		47°40′00″N 18°04′54″E	
Nagyigmánd Wind Turbine	Nagyigmánd	144	Wind Power Plant		47°40′23″N 18°05′04″E	
Nagyigmánd Wind Turbine	Nagyigmánd	144	Wind Power Plant		47°40′20″N 18°04′43″E	
Nagyigmánd Wind Turbine	Nagyigmánd	144	Wind Power Plant		47°40′20″N 18°04′22″E	
Nagyigmánd Wind Turbine	Nagyigmánd	144	Wind Power Plant		47°40′21″N 18°03′49″E	
Nagyigmánd Wind Turbine	Nagyigmánd	144	Wind Power Plant		47°40′10″N 18°03′32″E	
Nagyigmánd Wind Turbine	Nagyigmánd	144	Wind Power Plant		47°37′33″N 18°06′49″E	
Nagyigmánd Wind Turbine	Nagyigmánd	144	Wind Power Plant		47°40′01″N 18°07′08″E	
Nagyigmánd Wind Turbine	Nagyigmánd	144	Wind Power Plant		47°39′49″N 18°06′50″E	
Nagyigmánd Wind Turbine	Nagyigmánd	144	Wind Power Plant		47°39′23″N 18°07′15″E	
Nagyigmánd Wind Turbine	Nagyigmánd	144	Wind Power Plant		47°39′31″N 18°07′28″E	
Nagyigmánd Wind Turbine	Nagyigmánd	144	Wind Power Plant		47°39′27″N 18°07′45″E	
Nagyigmánd Wind Turbine	Nagyigmánd	144	Wind Power Plant		47°39′08″N 18°07′40″E	
Nagyigmánd Wind Turbine	Nagyigmánd	144	Wind Power Plant		47°39′13″N 18°07′56″E	
Nagyigmánd Wind Turbine	Nagyigmánd	144	Wind Power Plant		47°38′49″N 18°07′35″E	
Nagyigmánd Wind Turbine	Nagyigmánd	144	Wind Power Plant		47°38′41″N 18°07′10″E	
Nagyigmánd Wind Turbine	Nagyigmánd	144	Wind Power Plant		47°38′40″N 18°06′43″E	
Nagyigmánd Wind Turbine	Nagyigmánd	144	Wind Power Plant		47°38′31″N 18°06′29″E	
Mosonmagyaróvár Wind Turbine	Mosonmagyaróvár	144	Wind Power Plant		47°53′47″N 17°13′49″E	
Törökszentmiklós Wind Turbine	Törökszentmiklós	143	Wind Power Plant		47°08′36″N 20°26′46″E	
Mezőtúr Wind Turbine	Mezőtúr	143	Wind Power Plant		47°01′06″N 20°34′33″E	
Mosonmagyaróvár Wind Turbine	Mosonmagyaróvár	143	Wind Power Plant		47°53′46″N 17°14′22″E	
Mosonmagyaróvár Wind Turbine	Mosonmagyaróvár	143	Wind Power Plant		47°54′16″N 17°13′57″E	
Mosonmagyaróvár Wind Turbine	Mosonmagyaróvár	143	Wind Power Plant		47°54′09″N 17°13′44″E	
Mosonmagyaróvár Wind Turbine	Mosonmagyaróvár	143	Wind Power Plant		47°54′02″N 17°13′32″E	
Mosonmagyaróvár Wind Turbine	Mosonmagyaróvár	143	Wind Power Plant		47°53′12″N 17°13′47″E	
Mosonmagyaróvár Wind Turbine	Mosonmagyaróvár	143	Wind Power Plant		47°53′05″N 17°13′33″E	
Mosonmagyaróvár Wind Turbine	Mosonmagyaróvár	143	Wind Power Plant		47°53′21″N 17°14′09″E	
Mosonmagyaróvár Wind Turbine	Mosonmagyaróvár	142	Wind Power Plant		47°54′16″N 17°13′15″E	
Mosonmagyaróvár Wind Turbine	Mosonmagyaróvár	142	Wind Power Plant		47°54′08″N 17°13′01″E	
Mosonmagyaróvár Wind Turbine	Mosonmagyaróvár	142	Wind Power Plant		47°52′57″N 17°13′20″E	
Bátya Danube 400 kV-Powerline Crossing, Tower East	Bátya	138	Lattice tower		46°28′32″N 18°55′44″E	tallest electricity pylon in Hungary
Bátya Danube 400 kV-Powerline Crossing, Tower West	Gerjen	136	Lattice tower		46°28′31″N 18°54′54″E	
Gerecse TV Tower	Tardos	134	Tower		47°40′35″N 18°29′39″E	
Kozármisleny Mediumwave transmitter	Kozármisleny	133	Guyed mast		46°02′48.14″N 18°18′31.58″E	
Jászberény Shortwave Transmitter	Pusztamonostor	133	Guyed mast		47°34′26″N 19°50′33″E	
Jászberény Shortwave Transmitter	Pusztamonostor	133	Guyed mast		47°33′58″N 19°50′25″E	
Hegyhátsál TV Tower	Hegyhátsál	132	Tower		46°57′22″N 16°39′08″E	partially guyed
Tokaj TV Tower	Tokaj	130	concrete tower		48°7′12″N 21°22′55″E	, partially guyed tower
Kisperjes transmitter	Kisperjes	126	guyed mast		46°36′53.5″N 17°27′53.63″E	insulated against ground
Chimney of Tiszapalkonya Hőerőmű Power Station	Tiszapalkonya	125	Chimney		47°54′16″N 21°03′19″E	
Chimney of Tiszapalkonya Hőerőmű Power Station	Tiszapalkonya	125	Chimney		47°54′18″N 21°03′18″E	
Chimney of Tiszapalkonya Hőerőmű Power Station	Tiszapalkonya	125	Chimney		47°54′19″N 21°03′17″E	
Chimney of Bokod Power Station	Bokod	125	Chimney		47°30′06″N 18°16′16″E	
Meteorological tower of Paks Nuclear Power Plant	Paks	123	Lattice tower		46°34′30″N 18°50′50″E	
Chimney of Tatabánya Power Station	Tatabánya	123	Chimney		47°34′25″N 18°22′22″E	
Chimney of Szemétégető Power Station	Budapest	123	Chimney		47°34′57″N 19°08′03″E	
Chimney of Tiszapalkonya Hőerőmű Power Station	Tiszapalkonya	123	Chimney		47°54′20″N 21°03′16″E	
Békéscsaba TV Tower	Békéscsaba	123	Tower		46°41′18″N 21°02′25″E	
Levél Wind Turbine	Levél	123	Wind Power Plant		47°52′26″N 17°11′41″E	
Levél Wind Turbine	Levél	123	Wind Power Plant		47°52′19″N 17°11′35″E	
Levél Wind Turbine	Levél	123	Wind Power Plant		47°52′08″N 17°11′16″E	
Levél Wind Turbine	Levél	123	Wind Power Plant		47°52′02″N 17°11′06″E	
Levél Wind Turbine	Levél	123	Wind Power Plant		47°51′56″N 17°10′57″E	
Levél Wind Turbine	Levél	123	Wind Power Plant		47°52′43″N 17°11′24″E	
Levél Wind Turbine	Levél	123	Wind Power Plant		47°52′52″N 17°11′06″E	
Levél Wind Turbine	Levél	123	Wind Power Plant		47°52′59″N 17°10′47″E	
Levél Wind Turbine	Levél	123	Wind Power Plant		47°52′51″N 17°10′41″E	
Levél Wind Turbine	Levél	123	Wind Power Plant		47°52′44″N 17°10′35″E	
Levél Wind Turbine	Levél	123	Wind Power Plant		47°52′34″N 17°10′12″E	
Levél Wind Turbine	Levél	123	Wind Power Plant		47°53′07″N 17°10′30″E	
Szápár Wind Turbine	Szápár	122	Wind Power Plant		47°18′48″N 18°01′33″E	
Mosonmagyaróvár Wind Turbine	Mosonmagyaróvár	122	Wind Power Plant		47°52′51″N 17°13′08″E	
Ercsi Danube Powerline Crossing	Ercsi	122	Lattice tower		47°15′27″N 18°55′24″E	
Szigetszentmiklós radio mast	Szigetszentmiklós	121	Guyed mast		47°22′08″N 19°02′47″E	
Chimney of Dorog Power Station	Dorog	120	Chimney (concrete)	1980s	47°43′28″N 18°43′36″E	-
Úzd TV Tower	Úzd	120	concrete tower	?	46°35′28″N 18°34′45″E	, partially guyed
Lakihegy Transmitter, Mast 3	Szigetszentmiklós - Lakihegy	120	Guyed mast	?	47°22′7″N 19°0′23″E	insulated against ground
Szolnok Mediumwave Broadcasting Mast		119	Guyed mast		47°11′20″N 20°13′45″E	insulated against ground
Pallag TV Tower	Debrecen	118	Tower		47°34′39″N 21°38′04″E	
Dunavecse Danube Powerline Crossing, Tower East	Dunavecse	117	Lattice tower		46°54′06″N 18°57′41″E	
Lakihegy Transmitter, Mast 2	Szigetszentmiklós - Lakihegy	117	Guyed mast	?	47°22′48″N 19°0′13″E	insulated against ground
Transmission tower	Hegyhátsál	117	concrete tower	-	46°57′21″N 16°39′6″E	partially guyed
Cooling tower of Visonta power plant	Visonta	116	Cooling tower		47°47′28″N 20°04′08″E	
Cooling tower of Visonta power plant	Visonta	116	Cooling tower		47°47′27″N 20°04′07″E	
Cooling tower of Visonta power plant	Visonta	116	Cooling tower		47°47′28″N 20°04′06″E	
Cooling tower of Visonta power plant	Visonta	116	Cooling tower		47°47′29″N 20°04′07″E	
Cooling tower of Visonta power plant	Visonta	116	Cooling tower		47°47′29″N 20°04′11″E	
Cooling tower of Visonta power plant	Visonta	116	Cooling tower		47°47′30″N 20°04′10″E	
Cooling tower of Visonta power plant	Visonta	116	Cooling tower		47°47′29″N 20°04′09″E	
Cooling tower of Visonta power plant	Visonta	116	Cooling tower		47°47′28″N 20°04′10″E	
Tower of Megyeri Bridge	Dunakeszi	116	Piller		47°36′30″N 19°05′27″E	
Tower of Megyeri Bridge	Dunakeszi	116	Piller		47°36′24″N 19°05′38″E	
Nyíregyháza Radio Mast	Nyíregyháza	115	Guyed mast	1925	47°56′12.17″N 21°45′28.35″E	insulated against ground
Százhalombatta Danube Powerline Crossing North, Tower East	Százhalombatta	115	Lattice tower		47°17′50″N 18°55′46″E	
Százhalombatta Danube Powerline Crossing North, Tower West	Százhalombatta	115	Lattice tower		47°18′00″N 18°55′11″E	
Százhalombatta Danube Powerline Crossing South, Tower East	Százhalombatta	115	Lattice tower		47°17′46″N 18°55′41″E	
Százhalombatta Danube Powerline Crossing South, Tower West	Százhalombatta	115	Lattice tower		47°17′56″N 18°55′06″E	
Ercsi Danube Powerline Crossing	Ercsi	115	Lattice tower		47°15′27″N 18°55′24″E	
Cooling tower of Visonta Power Station	Visonta	113	Cooling tower		47°47′17″N 20°04′22″E	
Cooling tower of Visonta Power Station	Visonta	113	Cooling tower		47°47′16″N 20°04′20″E	
Cooling tower of Visonta Power Station	Visonta	113	Cooling tower		47°47′17″N 20°04′18″E	
Cooling tower of Visonta Power Station	Visonta	113	Cooling tower		47°47′18″N 20°04′21″E	
Cooling tower of Visonta Power Station	Visonta	113	Cooling tower		47°47′21″N 20°04′17″E	
Cooling tower of Visonta Power Station	Visonta	113	Cooling tower		47°47′21″N 20°04′14″E	
Cooling tower of Visonta Power Station	Visonta	113	Cooling tower		47°47′22″N 20°04′14″E	
Cooling tower of Visonta Power Station	Visonta	113	Cooling tower		47°47′23″N 20°04′16″E	
Vönöck Wind Turbine	Vönöck	113	Wind Power Plant		47°19′25″N 17°08′41″E	
Szabadhegy TV Tower	Győr	113	concrete tower		47°39′39″N 17°40′5″E	
Detk Powerline tower	Detk	111	Lattice tower		47°45′29″N 20°05′11″E	
Detk Powerline tower	Detk	111	Lattice tower		47°45′50″N 20°05′39″E	
Dunavecse Danube Powerline Crossing, Tower West	Dunavecse	111	Lattice tower		46°54′16″N 18°57′07″E	
Halmajugra Powerline tower	Halmajugra	110	Lattice tower		47°45′27″N 20°04′26″E	
Szárhegy TV Tower	Perkupa	110	Lattice tower		48°28′47″N 20°43′57″E	
Dunakeszi Danube Powerline Crossing	Dunakeszi	108	Lattice tower		47°39′28″N 19°06′42″E	
Györ TV Tower	Györ	107	Tower		47°39′38″N 17°40′07″E	
Erk Wind Turbine	Erk	107	Wind Power Plant		47°36′40″N 20°05′20″E	
Szentendre Danube Powerline Crossing	Szentendre	107	Lattice tower		47°38′14″N 19°05′29″E	
Mosonmagyaróvár Mediumwave Transmitter	Mosonmagyaróvár	106	Guyed mast		47°50′19.18″N 17°17′49.27″E	insulated against ground
Újrónafő Wind Turbine	Újrónafő	106	Wind Power Plant		47°48′58″N 17°10′09″E	
SOTE Nagyvárad téri Elméleti Tömb	Budapest	105	Highrise building		47°28′46″N 19°05′30″E	
Szeged Radio Tower		105	Lattice tower		46°17′26″N 20°10′35″E	
Kistapolca Cement Factory	Kistapolca	105	Klin		45°48′43″N 18°23′49″E	
Királyegyháza Cement Factory	Királyegyháza	105	Klin		46°00′58″N 17°58′58″E	
Chimney of Zoltek Zrt.	Nyergesújfalu	105	Chimney		47°45′45″N 18°34′06″E	
Majosháza Danube Powerline Crossing	Majosháza	105	Lattice tower		47°15′14″N 18°59′05″E	
Chimney of Százhalombatta Power Plant		104	Chimney		47°19′48″N 18°54′57″E	
Medveďov Danube Powerline Crossing	Medveďov	104	Pylon		47°47′23″N 17°38′39″E	
Chimney of TIFO	Tiszapalkonya	104	Chimney		47°53′54″N 21°01′58″E	
ORFK Tower	Budapest	104	Tower		47°33′01″N 19°00′05″E	
Árpádhalom Wind Turbine	Árpádhalom	104	Wind Power Plant		46°37′34″N 20°33′45″E	
Chimney of CSEPEL Power Plant		104	Chimney		47°25′42″N 19°03′13″E	
Abony Meteorological Mast	Abony	104	Guyed mast		47°12′18″N 20°04′05″E	
Chimney of Magyar aluminium works	Ajka	104	Chimney		47°05′47″N 17°33′32″E	
Szigetcsép Danube Powerline Crossing	Szigetcsép	104	Lattice tower		47°15′23″N 18°58′37″E	
Chimney of Györ Heating Power Station	Györ	103	Chimney		47°40′58″N 17°40′12″E	
Telekgerendás Wind Turbine	Telekgerendás	103	Wind Power Plant		46°39′41″N 20°55′59″E	
Jászberény Shortwave Transmitter	Pusztamonostor	103	Guyed mast		47°34′22″N 19°50′35″E	
Jászberény Shortwave Transmitter	Pusztamonostor	103	Guyed mast		47°34′01″N 19°50′29″E	
Majosháza Danube Powerline Crossing	Majosháza	103	Lattice tower		47°15′14″N 18°59′05″E	
Majosháza Danube Powerline Crossing	Majosháza	103	Lattice tower		47°15′23″N 18°58′37″E	
Timföldgyár Chimney	Kiskolónia	102	Chimney		47°43′52″N 18°15′22″E	
Mosonmagyaróvár Chimney	Mosonmagyaróvár	102	Chimney		47°52′00″N 17°14′50″E	
Chimney of Berente Power Station	Berente	102	Chimney		48°14′06″N 20°41′06″E	
Chimney of Berente Power Station	Berente	102	Chimney		48°14′05″N 20°41′21″E	
Ikervár Meteorological Mast	Ikervár	102	Guyed mast		47°12′20″N 16°52′41″E	
Chimney of Ipari Park	Kaba	102	Chimney		47°21′13″N 21°14′44″E	
Chimney of Basamalom Power Station	Pécs	102	Chimney		46°03′52″N 18°15′46″E	
Csém Meteorological Mast	Csém	101	Mast		47°40′44″N 18°04′45″E	
Chimney of Komló Power Station	Komló	101	Chimney		46°11′18″N 18°15′46″E	
Klin of Vác Duna-Dráva Cement	Vác	101	Cooling tower		47°48′35″N 19°06′11″E	
Chimney of Berente Power Station	Berente	101	Chimney		48°14′08″N 20°41′04″E	
Szekesfehervar Telecommunication Tower	Szekesfehervar	101	Lattice tower		47°09′10″N 18°23′42″E	
Ács Meteorological Mast	Ács	101	Guyed mast		47°41′30″N 17°56′55″E	
Chimney of Magyar aluminium works	Ajka	101	Chimney		47°05′42″N 17°33′07″E	
Chimney of MOL Dunai Olajfinomító	Ercsi	101	Chimney		47°16′25″N 18°53′43″E	
Chimney of MOL Dunai Olajfinomító	Ercsi	101	Chimney		47°16′44″N 18°54′21″E	
Szentendre Danube Powerline Crossing	Szentendre	101	Lattice tower		47°38′05″N 19°04′57″E	
Túrkeve Radio Mast	Túrkeve	100	Tower		47°07′20″N 20°44′18″E	
Chimney of Paks Nuclear Power Plant	Paks	100	Chimney		46°34′23″N 18°51′07″E	
Pusztahencse Meteorological Mast	Pusztahencse	100	Mast		46°36′13″N 18°44′13″E	
Chimney of Paks Nuclear Power Plant	Paks	100	Chimney		46°34′23″N 18°51′07″E	
Chimney of TVK	Tiszaújváros	100	Chimney		47°54′52″N 21°01′41″E	
Chimney of Paks Nuclear Power Plant	Paks	100	Chimney		46°34′31″N 18°51′07″E	
Chimney of Paks Nuclear Power Plant	Paks	100	Chimney		46°34′32″N 18°51′07″E	
Nagyigmánd Meteorological Mast	Nagyigmánd	100	Guyed mast		47°37′32″N 18°06′04″E	
Chimney of Magyar aluminium works	Ajka	100	Chimney		47°05′48″N 17°33′35″E	
Bábolna Meteorological Mast	Bábolna	100	Mast		47°40′27″N 18°01′08″E	
Újrónafő Wind Turbine	Újrónafő	100	Wind Power Plant		47°48′45″N 17°10′43″E	
Dunakeszi Danube Powerline Crossing	Dunakeszi	100	Lattice tower		47°39′34″N 19°07′16″E	
Bazita Peak TV Tower	Zalaegerszeg	100	Concrete tower		46°48′49″N 16°48′44″E	

== Trivia ==
The Magasház of Pécs was mentioned in the Guinness Book of Records as the tallest uninhabited structure in Central Europe.

The TV tower of Kékes is "only" 178 m tall, but its location on the top of Hungary's highest mountain makes its top 1201 m high above sea level.

== Gallery ==
=== Non-Buildings Structures ===
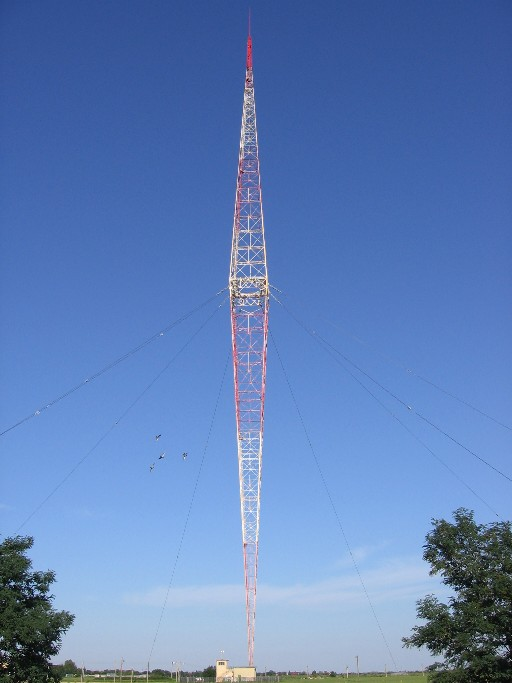
Lakihegy Radio Mast

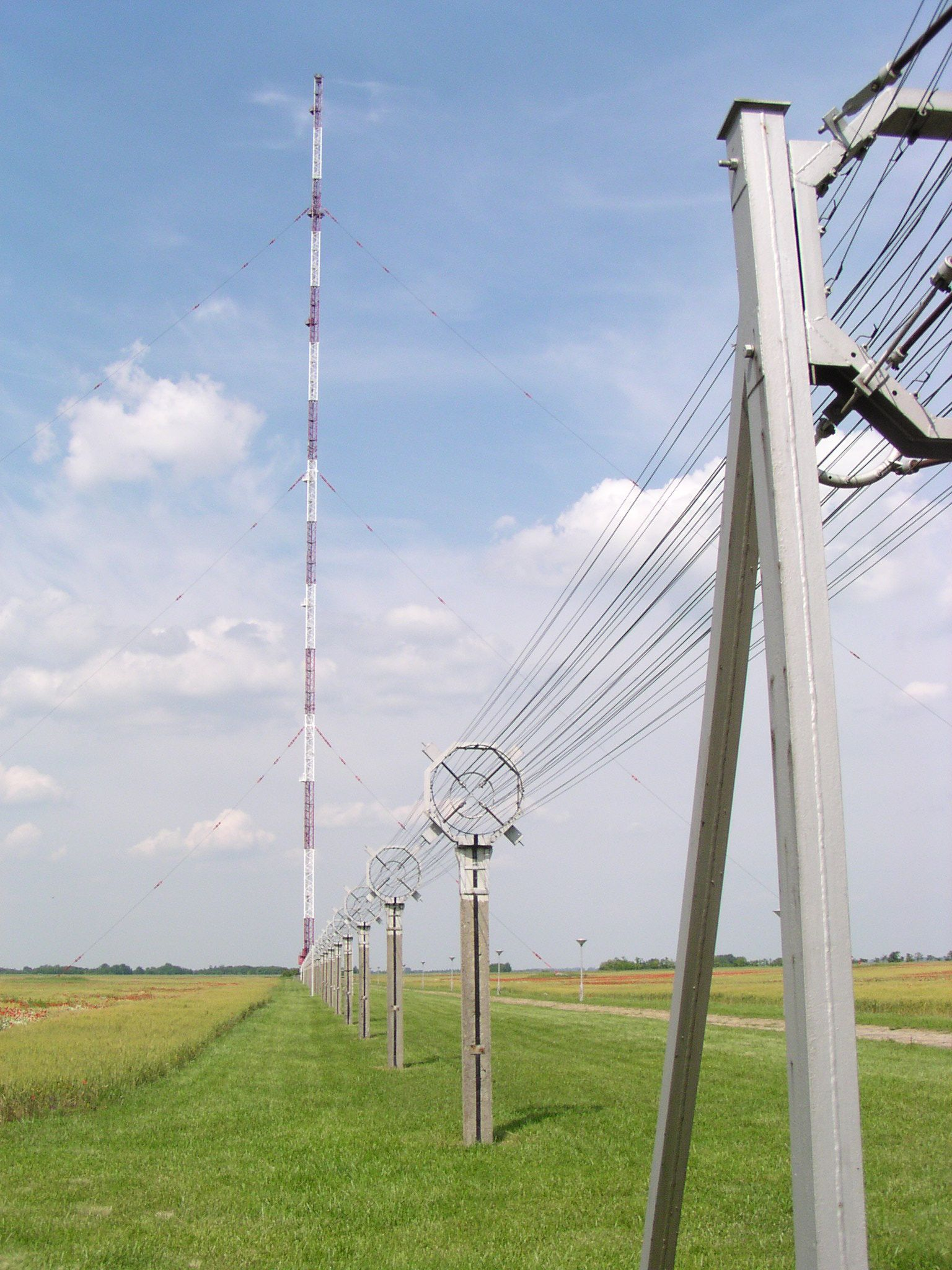
Mast of Solt transmitter

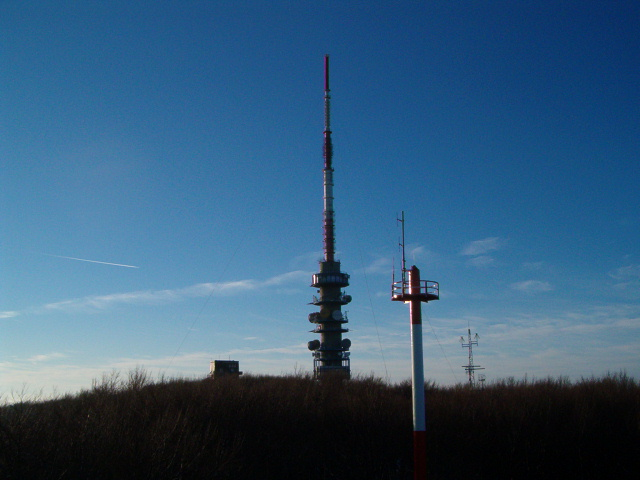
Kékestető TV Tower

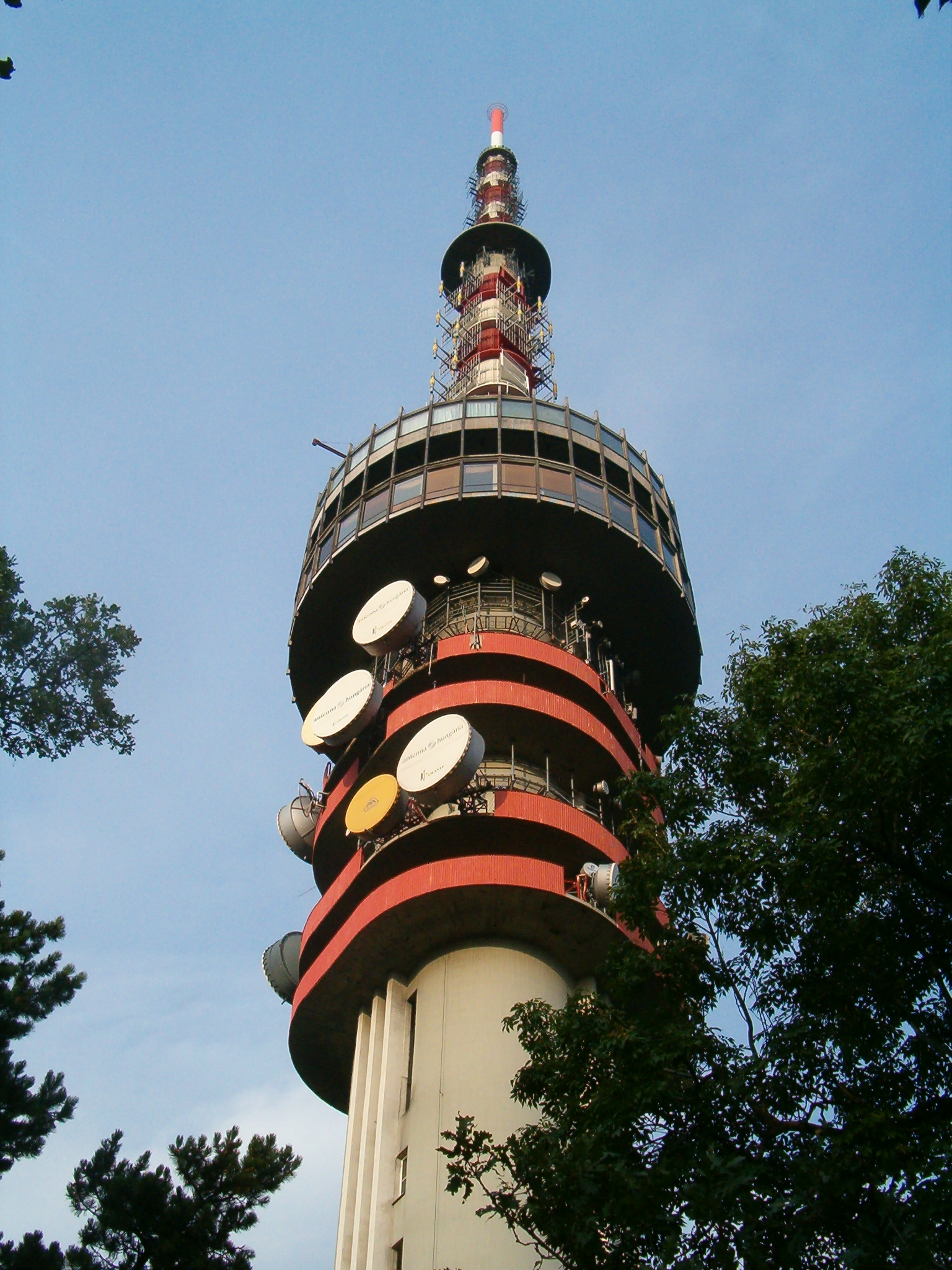
Pécs TV Tower

=== Buildings ===
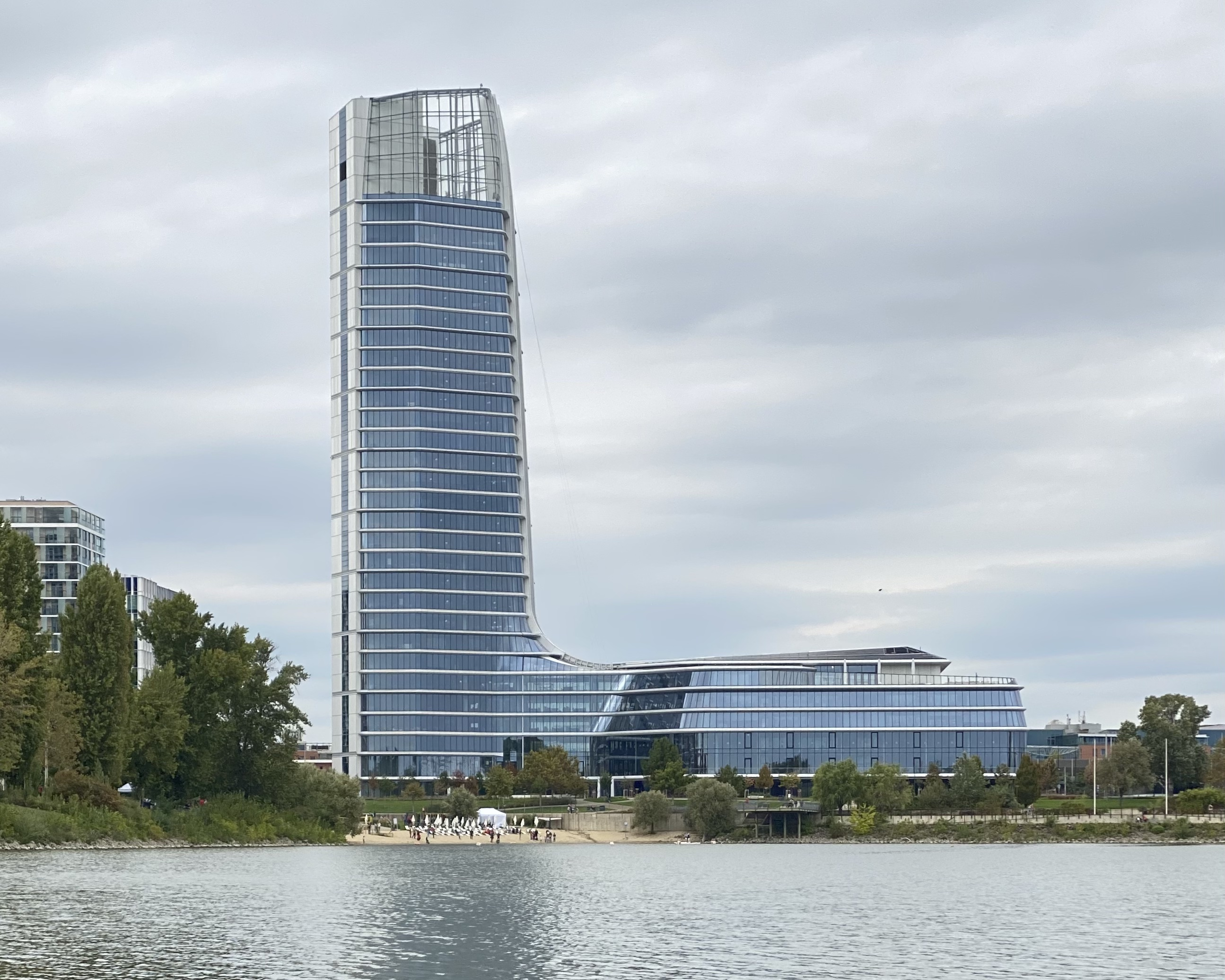
MOL Campus Commercial Office Headquarters

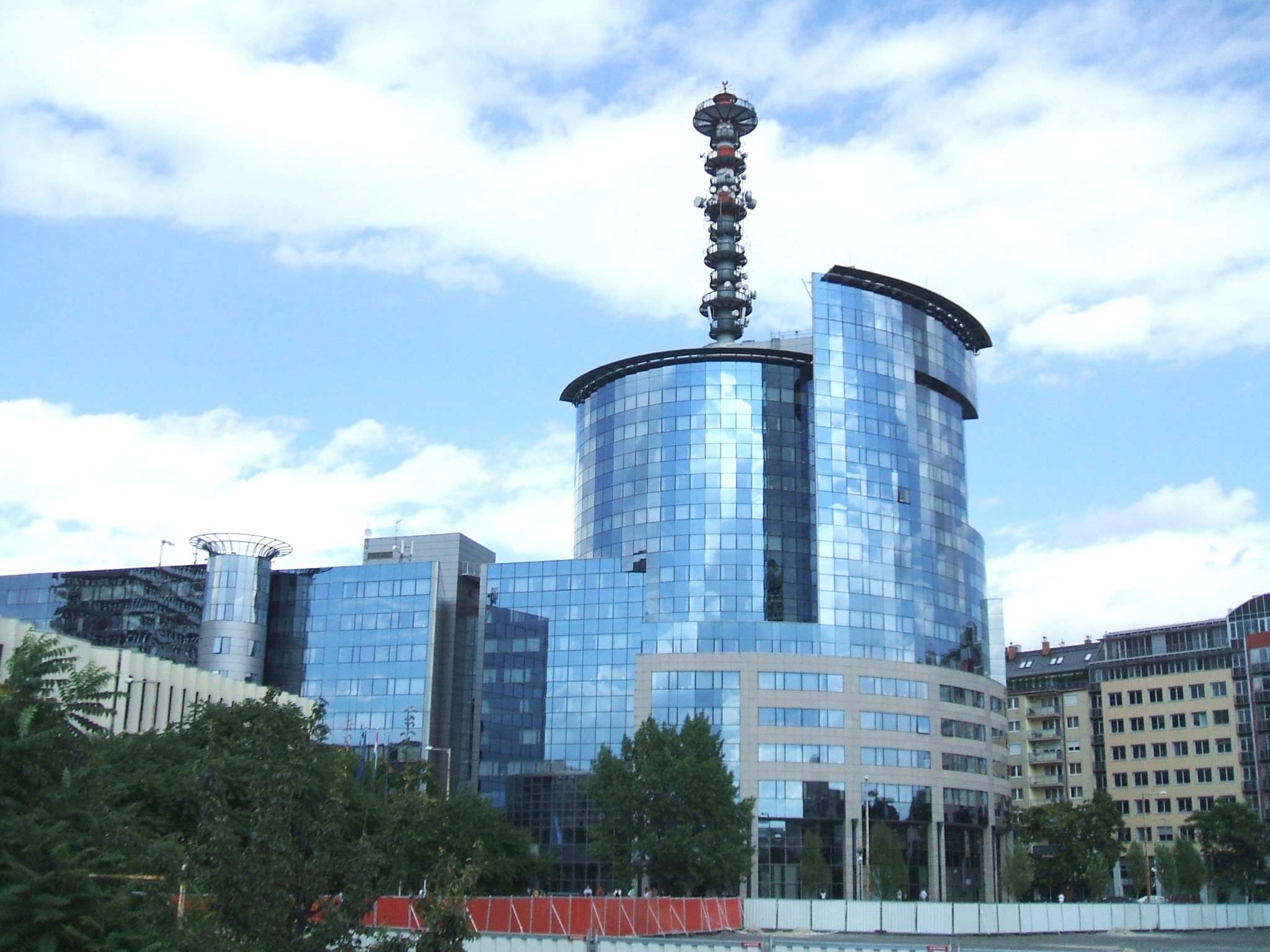
Hungarian Police HQ (Police Palace), Budapest

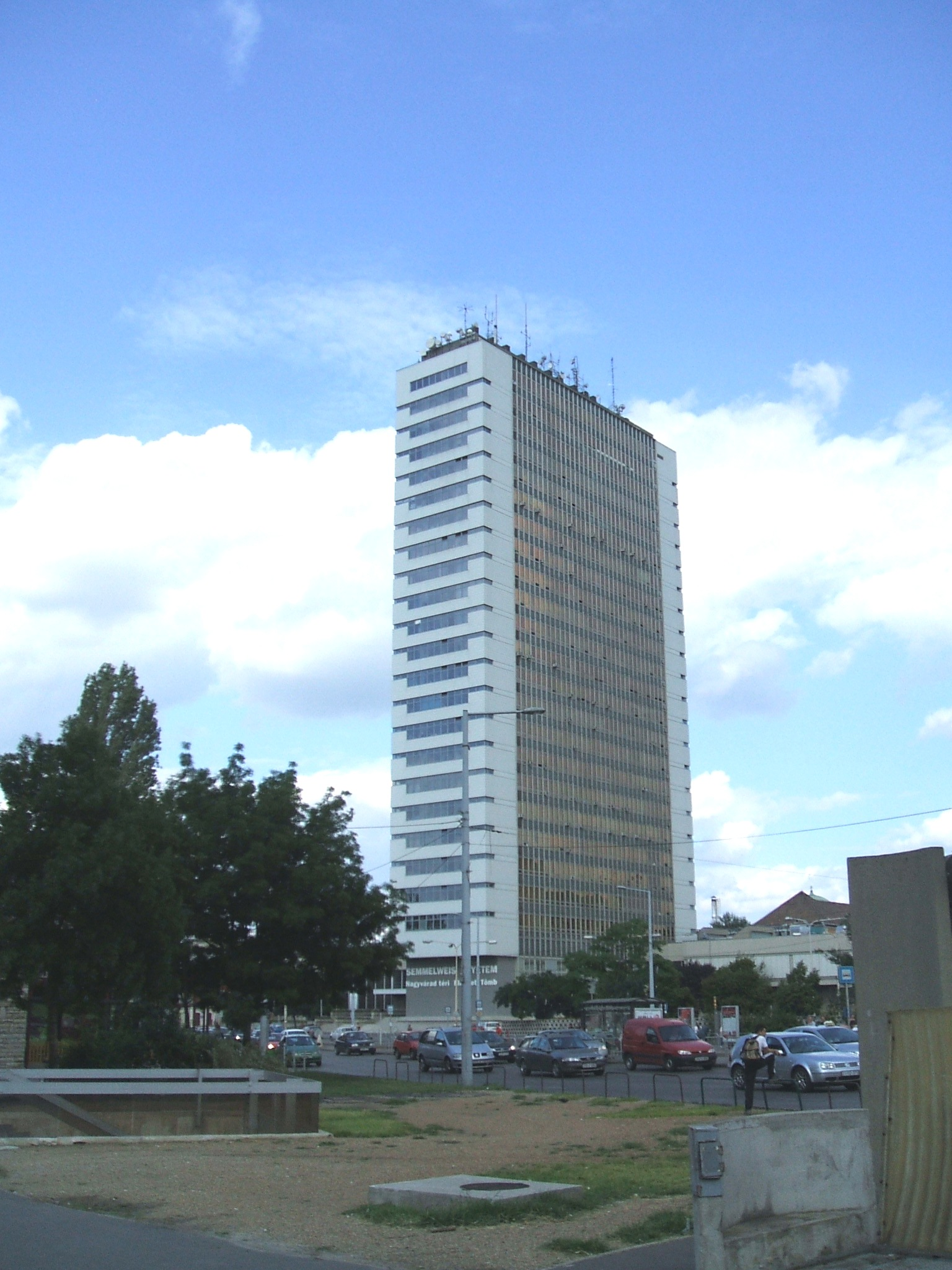
Semmelweis University Tower, Nagyvárad Square, Budapest

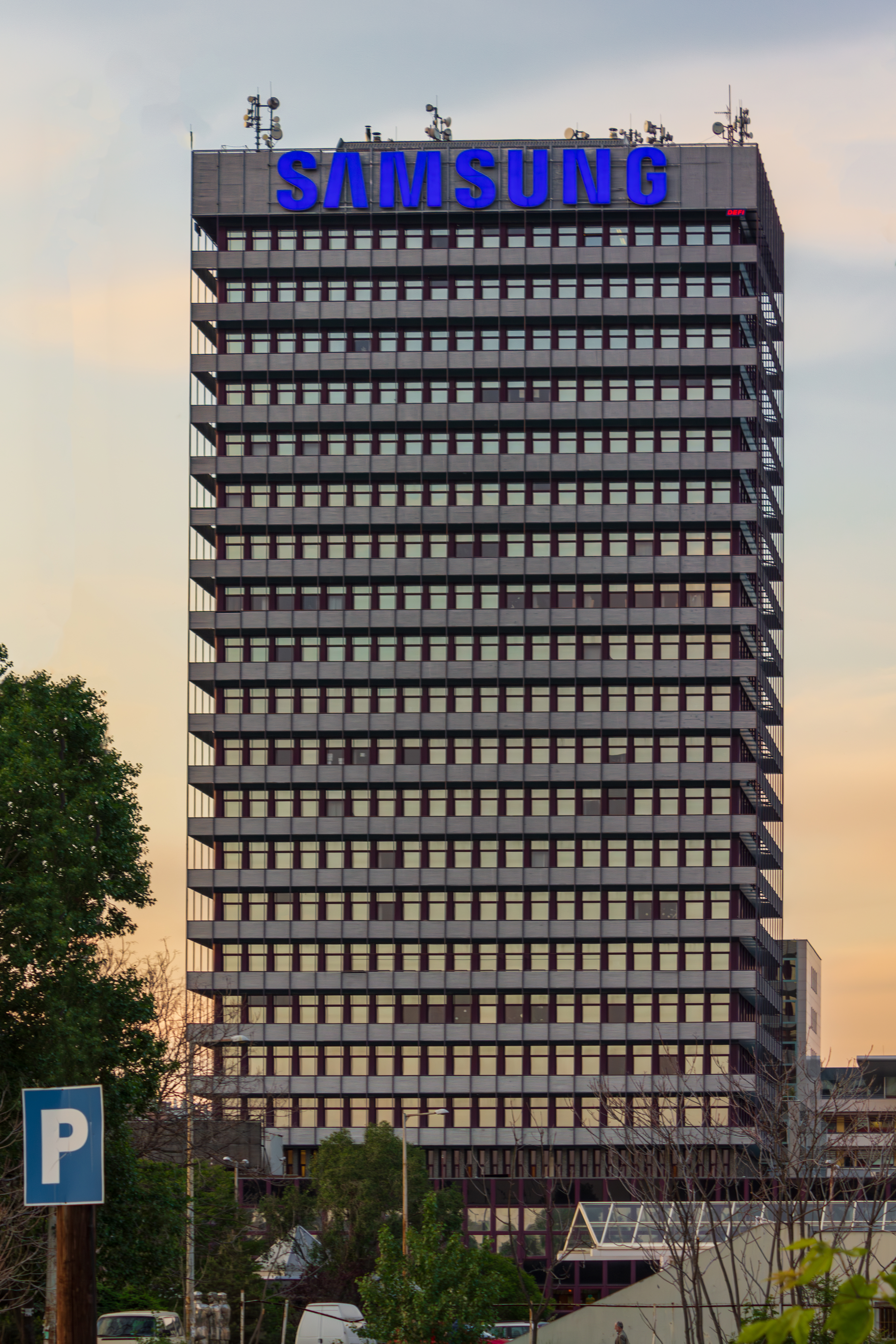
National Pension Insurance, Budapest

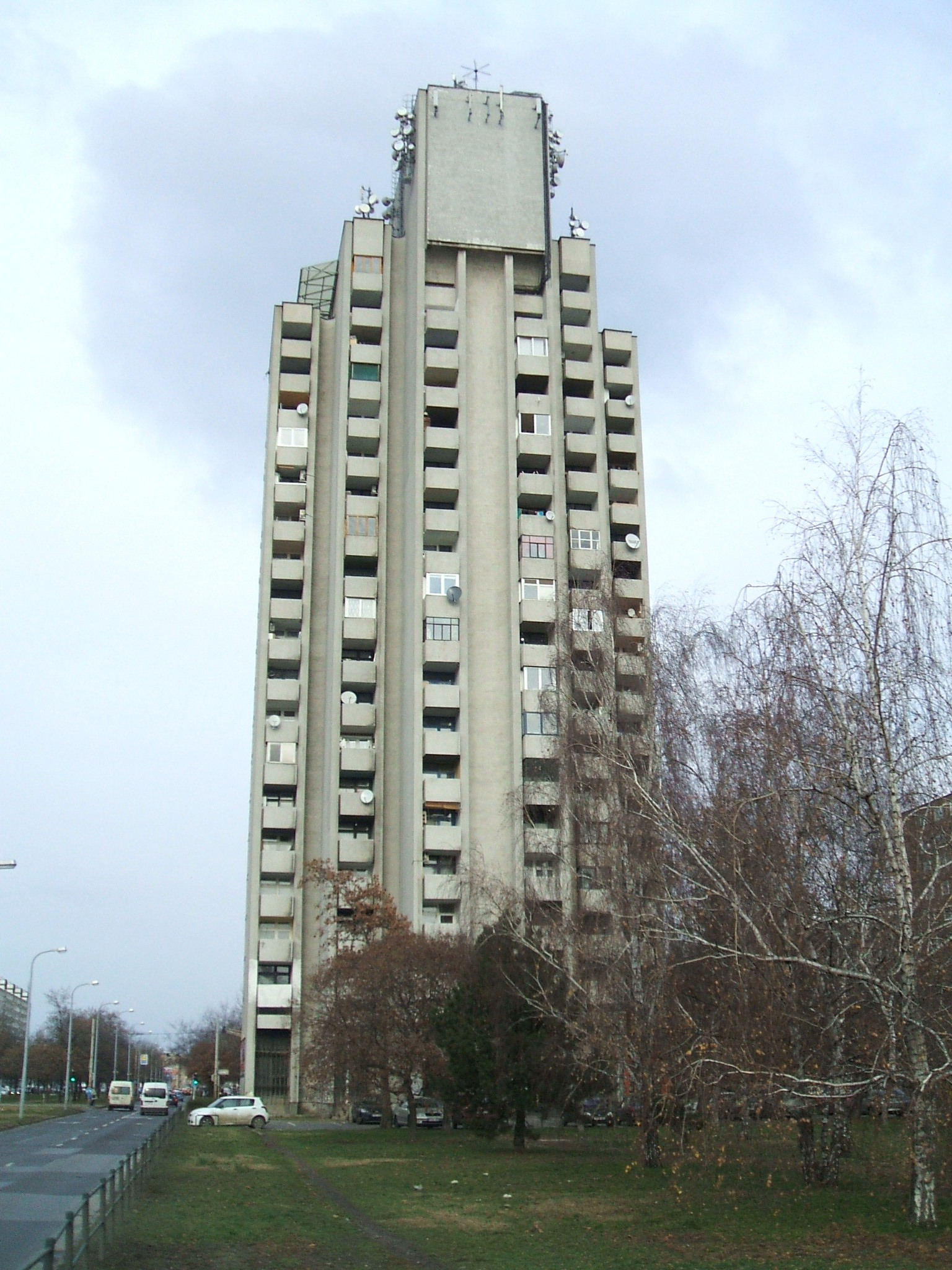
Újpalota Tower, Budapest

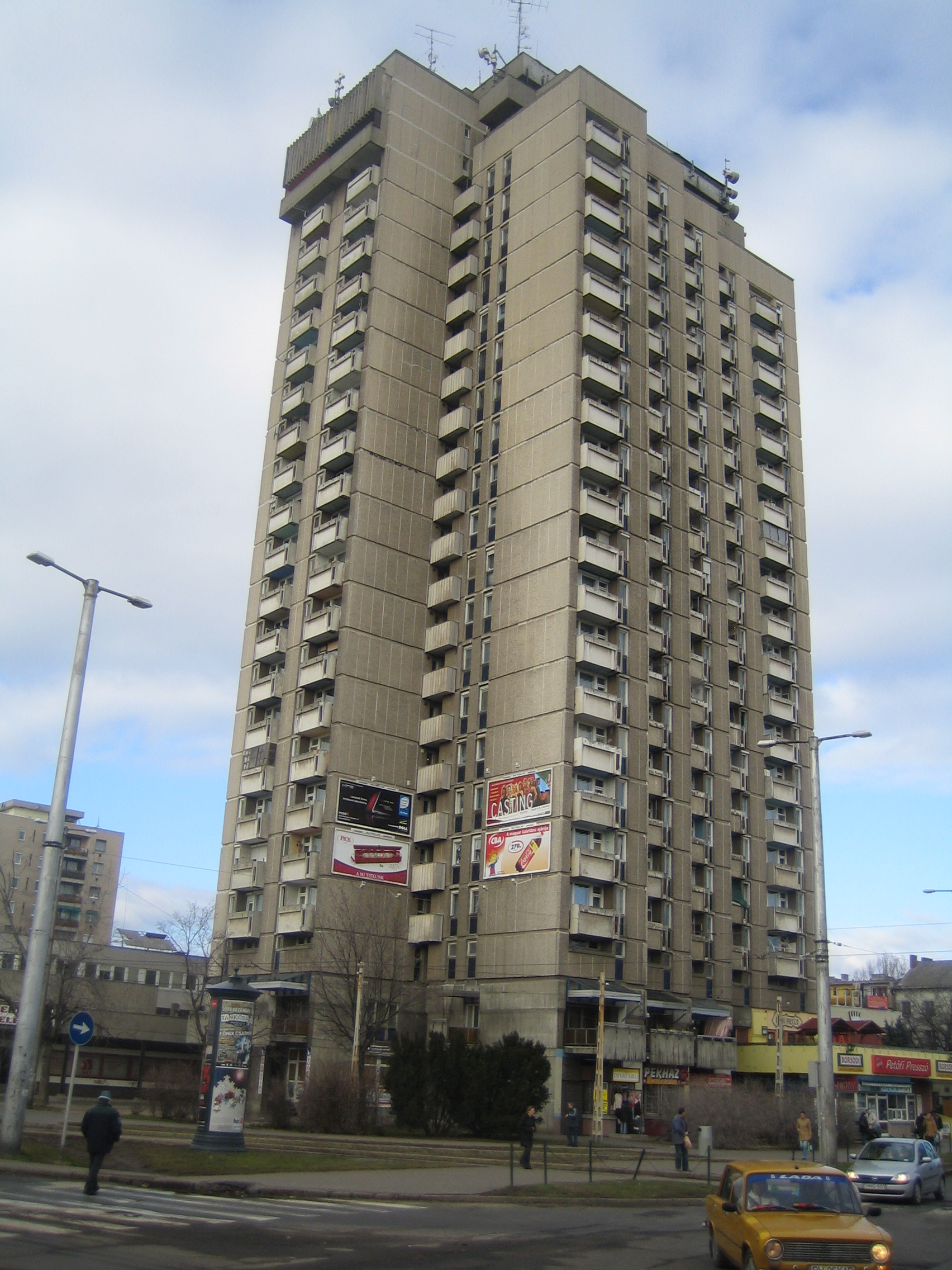
Residential tower, Debrecen

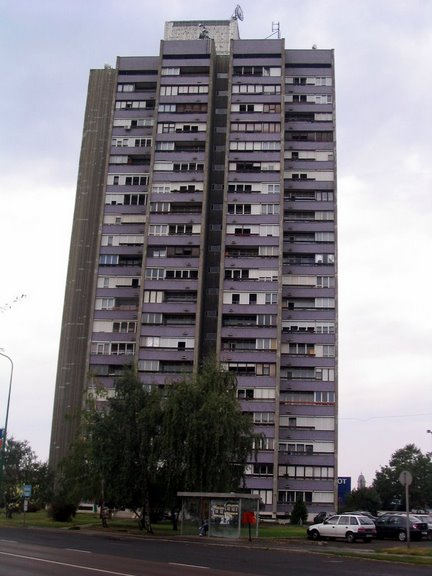
Residential tower, Gyöngyös

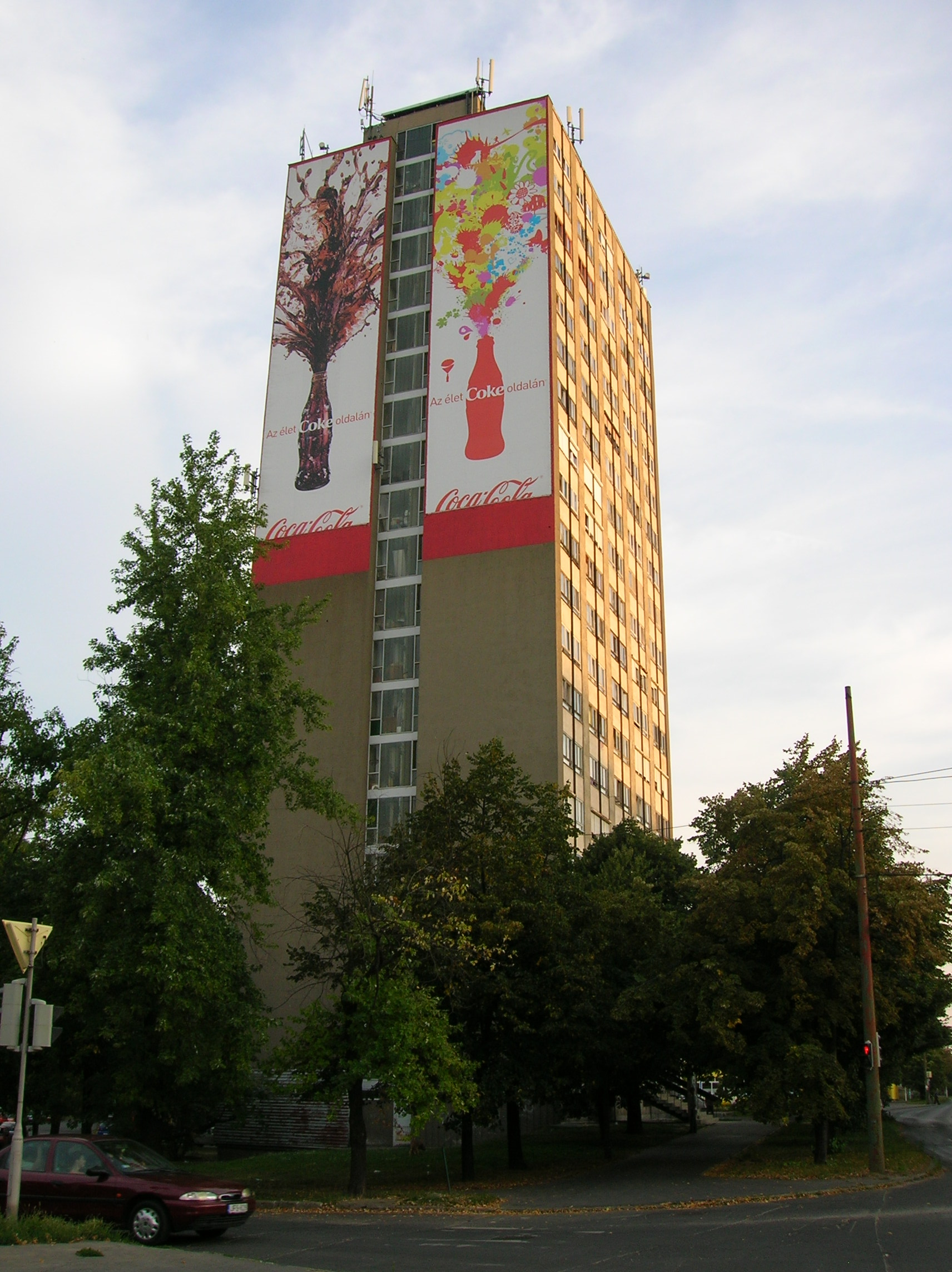
Residential tower, Miskolc

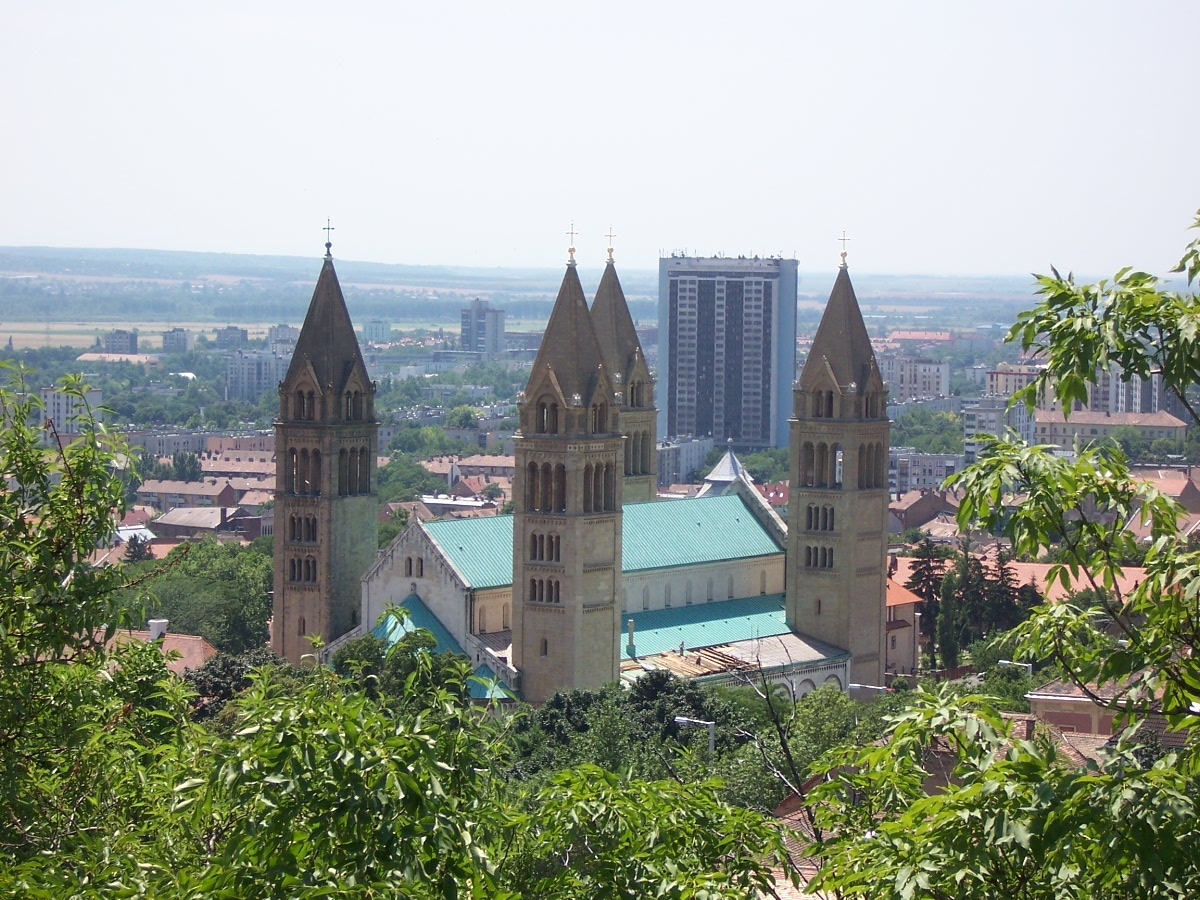
Magasház with the Pécs Cathedral

== Sources ==
- World's Tallest Skyscrapers by country
- "Hungarian tallnesses" (Hungarian only)
- Hungarian Wikipedia
- Air-traffic obstacle list of Hungary
