= Ikervár Wind Farm =

Wind farm in Hungary

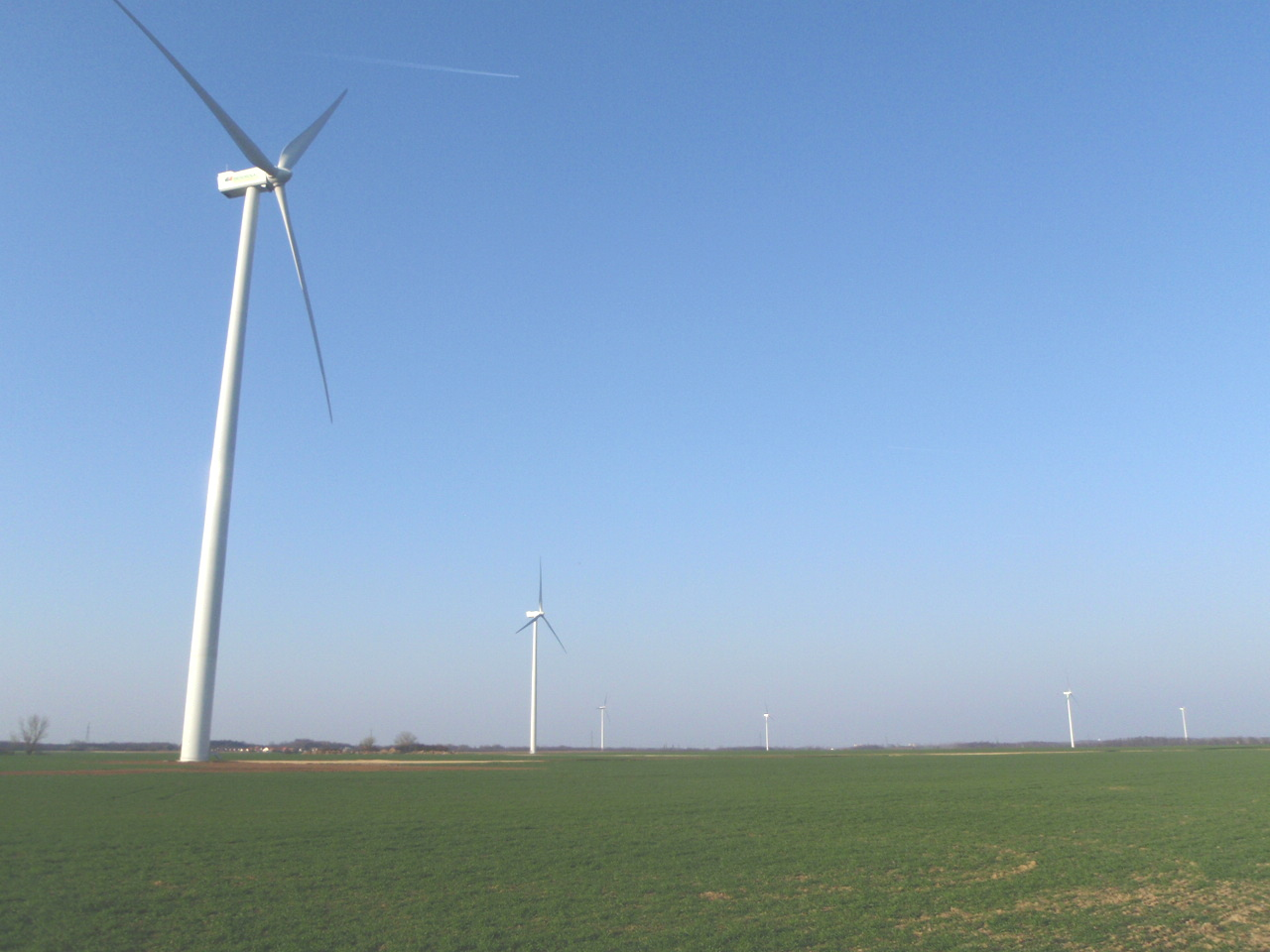
- Country: Hungary
- Location: Ikervár, Vas County
- Coordinates: 47°12′3″N 16°52′8″E
- Status: Operational
- Commission date: 1 April 2011
- Owner: Iberdrola Renovables

Power generation
- Units operational: 17
- Nameplate capacity: 34 MW

External links
- Commons: Related media on Commons

The Ikervár Wind Farm is a wind power project in Vas County, Hungary. It has 17 individual wind turbines with a nominal output of around 2 MW delivering up to 34 MW of power, with a capital investment required of approximately US$81 million.

Construction works were finished in early spring 2011, the trial operation ended on 31 March. After the successful trial operation, 17 wind turbines have been put into operation on 1 April 2011

Iberdola Renovables installed wind turbines model G90 made by Gamesa of Spain. These wind turbines are 100 metre high and have 44 metre long blades. The nominal output of each wind turbine is two MW. Gamesa is responsible for manufacturing, delivering and installing the turbines. After putting into operation, maintenance will be provided under Gamesa's supervision during the two-year warranty period, after which it will be taken over by the local team.

== See also ==
- Rábaköz Wind Farm
- Veszprém Wind Farm
