= Misina =

Mountain in Hungary

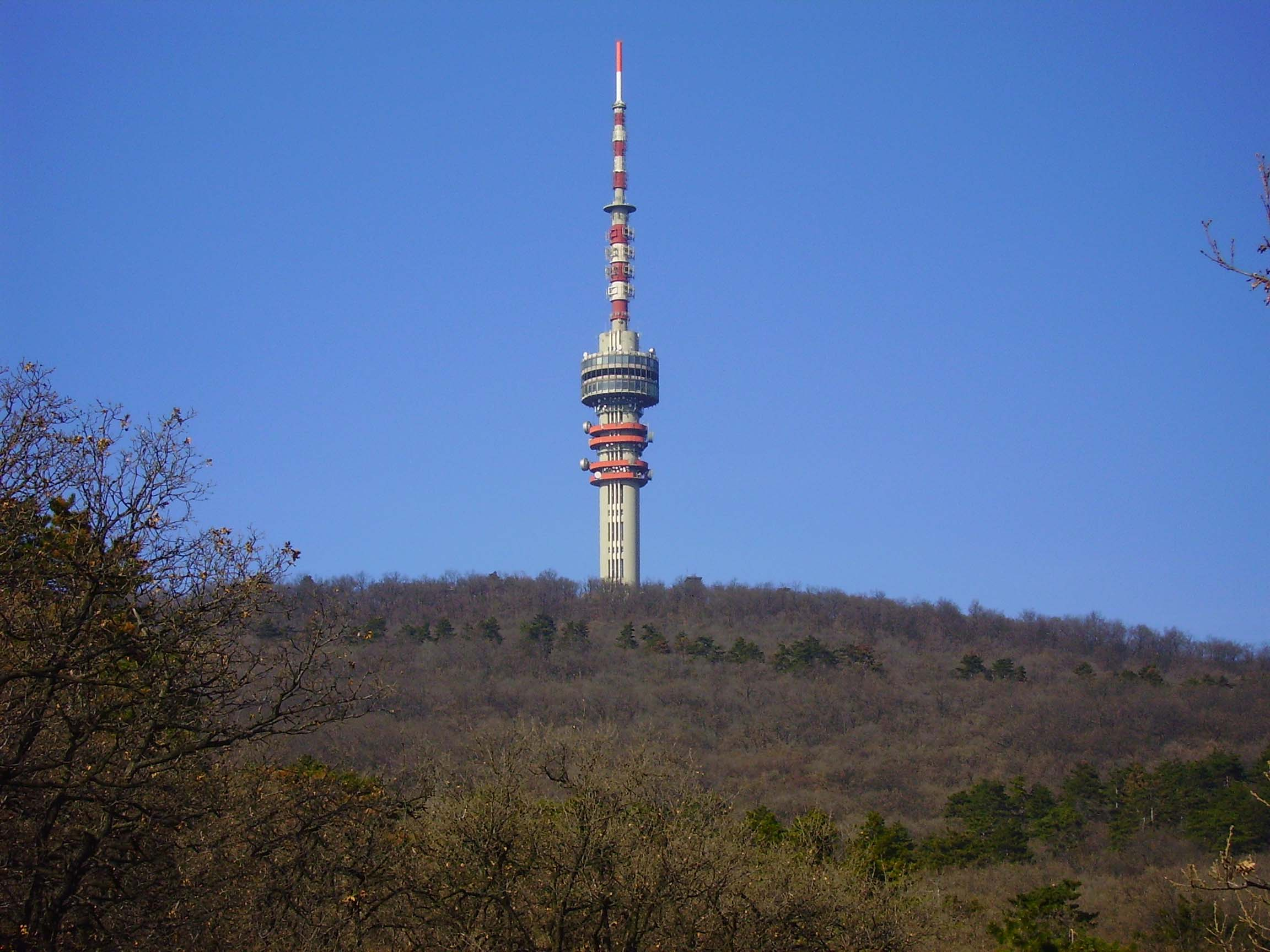

Highest point
- Elevation: 535 m (1,755 ft)
- Coordinates: 46°5′57″N 18°12′9″E

Naming
- Language of name: Hungarian

Geography
- Location within Hungary
- Location: Baranya county, Hungary
- Parent range: Mecsek, Transdanubia

Misina is a peak in the Mecsek mountain range in Baranya county, in southern Hungary. Its elevation is 535 metres (1755 ft) above sea level. On the peak stands the 197-metre-high Pécs TV Tower, which was finished in 1973 and is the tallest building in Hungary. Misina also hosts a simple ski piste.
