= Transmitter Solt =

Radio transmitter station in Hungary

Coordinates: 46°50′3.51″N 19°1′53.64″E

- Solti rádióadó
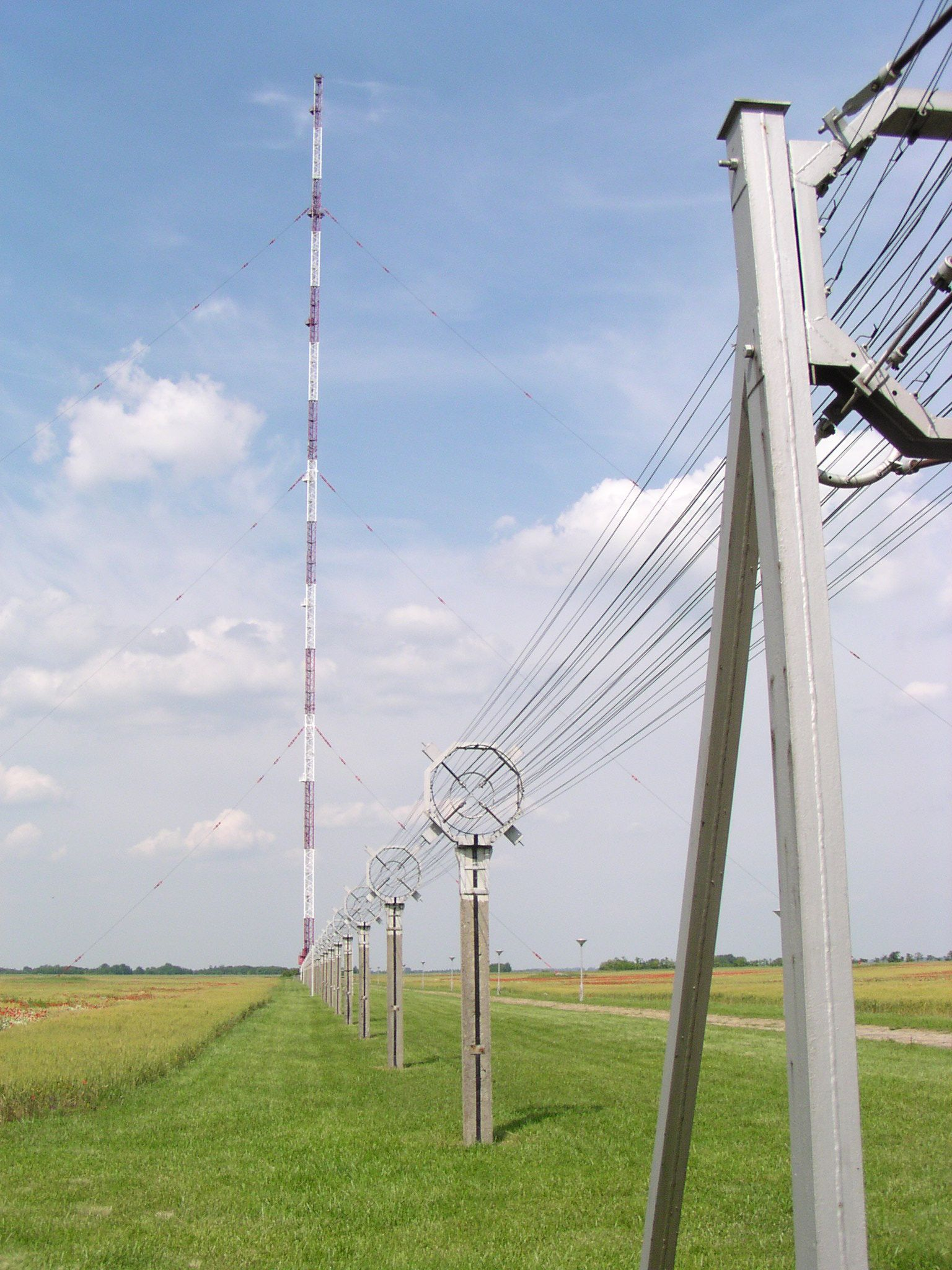
- Interactive map of the Transmitter Solt area

General information
- Status: In use
- Type: Mast radiator insulated against ground
- Location: Solt, Bács-Kiskun, Hungary
- Construction started: 6 September 1974
- Completed: 10 January 1977

Height
- Height: 303.6 m

Design and construction
- Main contractor: Magyar Posta (Hungarian Post)

The Transmitter Solt (Hungarian: Solti rádióadó) is a radio transmission facility for 540 kHz MW (Medium Wave) near Solt, Hungary, serving as the primary transmitter site for Kossuth Rádió. With an output power of 2000 kW (2 MW), it is the most powerful radio transmitter in Europe and is among the most powerful radio transmitters in the world. Its intended broadcast area covers the Hungarian-speaking territories of Central- and Eastern Europe, however successful reception of the Kossuth Rádió was reported from as far as Michigan, United States and Kuala Lumpur, Malaysia. It uses a 303.6-metre tall guyed mast. The transmitter site (including all its original equipment) has been a preserved industrial monument since 2013.

== Location ==
Transmitter Solt is located in the Great Hungarian Plain, 4 km north from Solt and 80 km south from Budapest.

== History ==
By the early 1970s, interference from the increasing number of powerful MW transmitters across Europe rendered the Lakihegy Transmitter inadequate to provide the required coverage (covered approximately 50% of the territory of Hungary in 1972) so the Magyar Posta (Hungarian Post) and the central government decided to build a new transmitter with improved characteristics. The high priority project involved Hungarian, Polish and Soviet engineers from several companies and organizations. Construction works started in 1974, with several farmhouses and barns having been demolished on the intended site.

The transmitter was completed in 1977 and went on air the same year. It underwent a substantial renovation and equipment modernisation in 2017.

== Equipment ==
The original 1977 transmitter was made of two identical, Soviet-made vacuum tube based 1000 kW units, combined for the required 2000 kW output power. It was replaced in 2017 by a solid state Nautel NX2000 consisting of five DRM-enabled NX400 units combined for 2000 kW output. The original vacuum tube transmitter (being a preserved industrial monument) remains on site as a functional backup unit.

== See also ==
- Kossuth Rádió
- Lakihegy Tower
- List of masts
- List of European medium wave transmitters
- List of tallest structures in Hungary
