= Veszprém Wind Farm =

Wind farm in Hungary

- Country: Hungary
- Location: Veszprém, Veszprém County
- Status: Planned
- Commission date: 2012
- Owner: SWS Group

Power generation
- Units operational: 30
- Nameplate capacity: 60 MW

The Veszprém Wind Farm is an under construction wind power project in Veszprém County, Hungary. It will have 30 individual wind turbines with a nominal output of around 2 MW which will deliver up to 60 MW of power, enough to power over 40,100 homes, with a capital investment required of approximately US$225 million.
