= Pécs TV Tower =

Television tower in Pécs, Hungary

Coordinates: 46.0992°N 18.2201°E

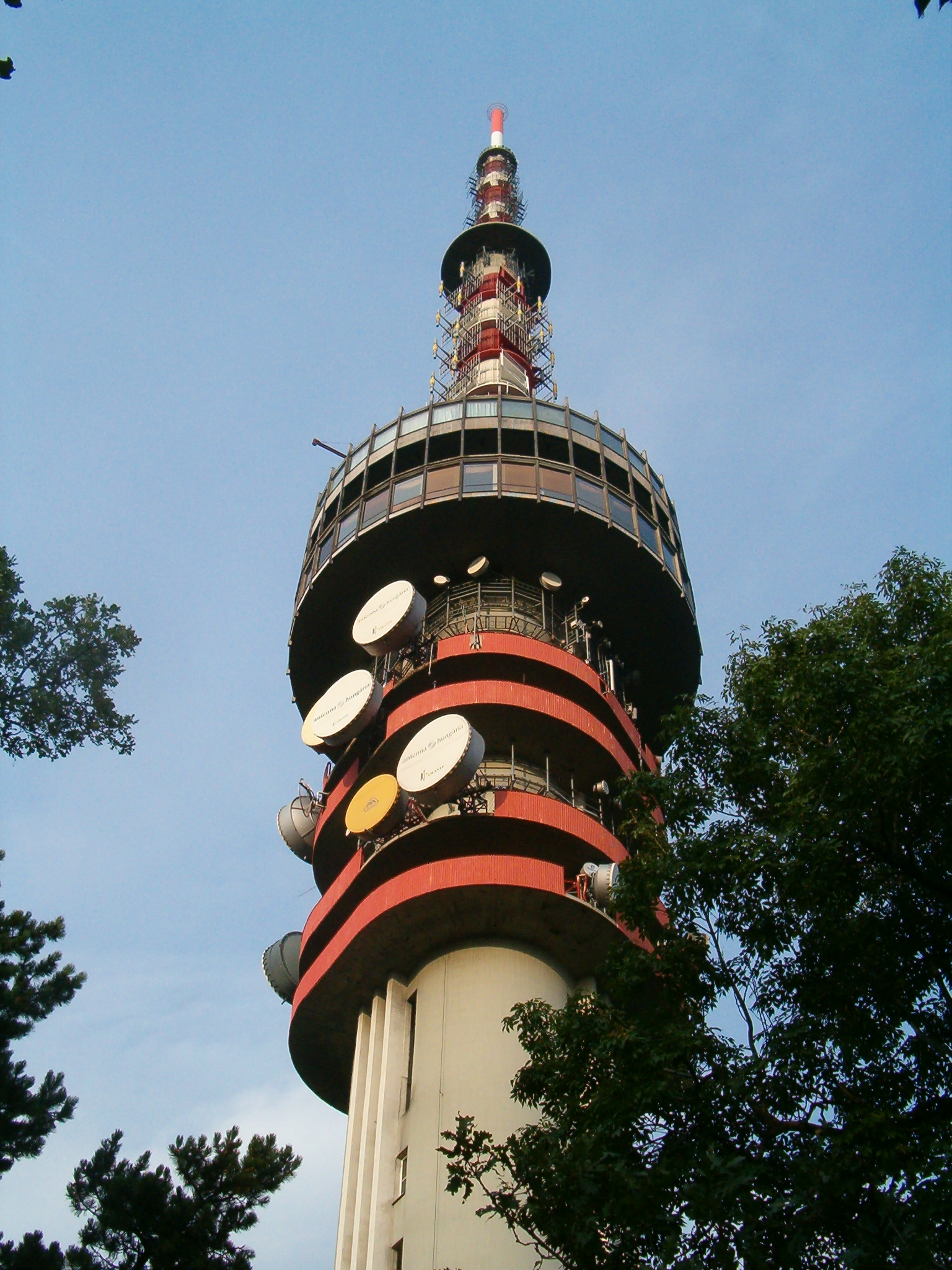
The Tower

The Pécs TV Tower is a television tower in Pécs, Hungary, standing on the Misina peak of Mecsek (535 meters), measuring 197 metres, the tallest building in Hungary, with a publicly accessible observation deck at a height of 75 metres, and a restaurant at 72 metres. The tower was built from 1968 to 1973. There is a dinosaur exhibition at the restaurant level, with two life-sized dinosaur mock-ups, depicting the once native Komlosaurus.
