= Bazita Peak TV Tower =

Television broadcasting tower in Hungary

Coordinates: 46°48′49″N 16°48′45″E

Bazita TV Tower
- Bazitai tévétorony
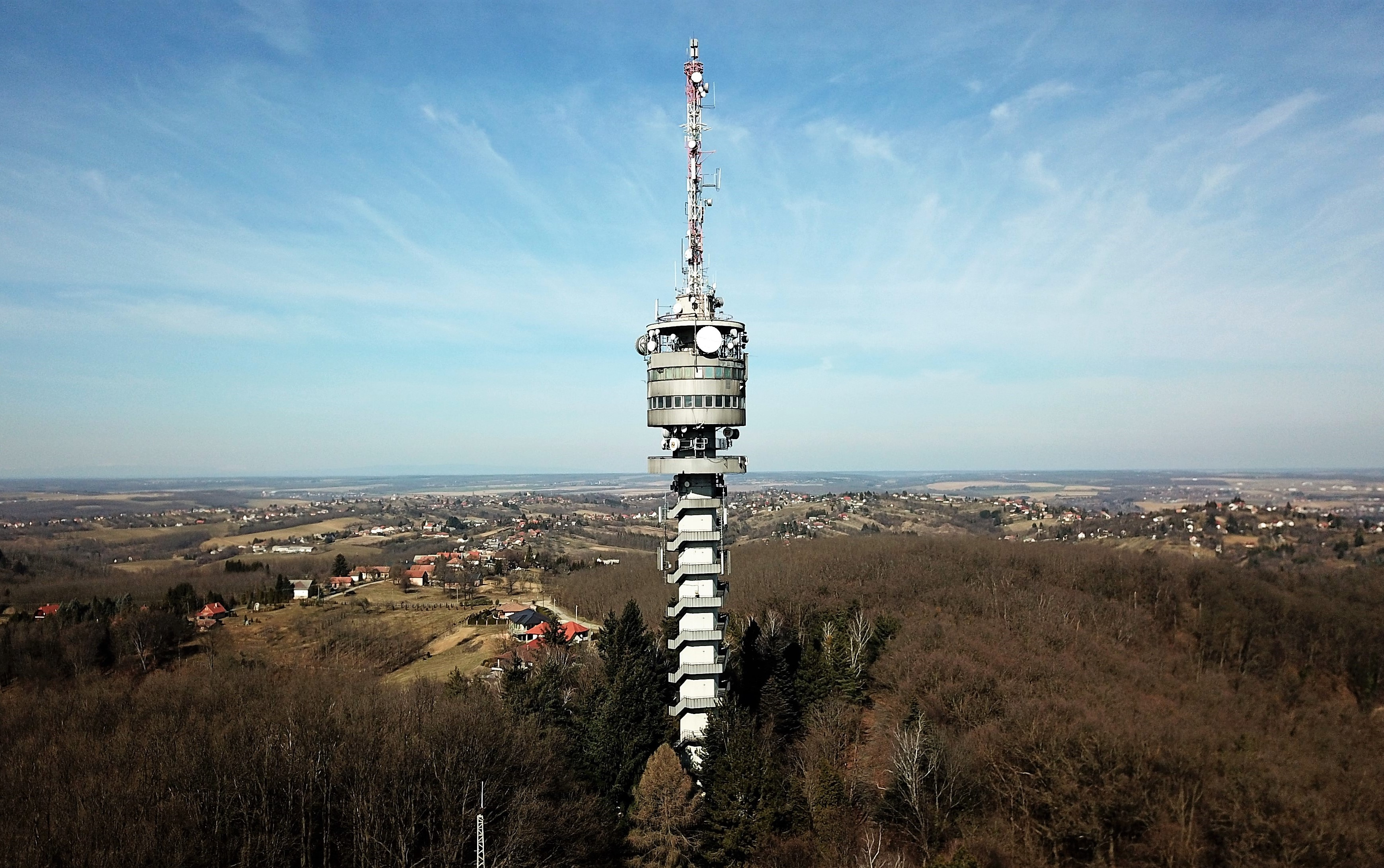
- Interactive map of the Bazita TV Tower area

General information
- Status: In use
- Type: TV tower
- Location: Zalaegerszeg, Zala County, Hungary
- Completed: 1973

Height
- Height: 95 m

Bazita Peak TV Tower is a 100 m (330 ft) broadcasting tower in Zalaegerszeg, Hungary. The tower has a 13 m (43 ft) antenna atop the main structure and an observation level 60 m (200 ft) up the structure. The Alps can be clearly seen from the observation deck. Built in 1975, an elevator transports visitors to the café on the observation level and a staircase outside of the main shaft allows maintenance access.

== See also ==
- List of towers
