= Solt =

- Town
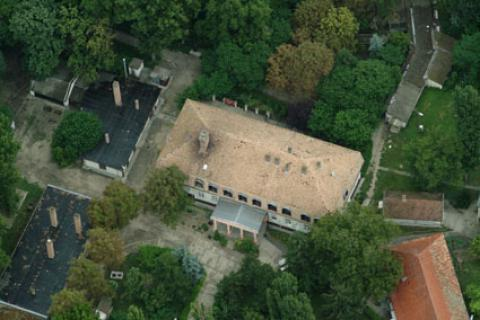
- Aerial view

- Flag Coat of arms

- Location within Hungary
- Coordinates: 46.80103°N 19.00416°E
- Country: Hungary
- County: Bács-Kiskun
- District: Kalocsa

Area
  - Total: 132.67 km^{2} (51.22 sq mi)

Population (2008)
  - Total: 6,721
  - Density: 53.99/km^{2} (139.8/sq mi)
- Time zone: UTC+1 (CET)
  - Summer (DST): UTC+2 (CEST)
- Postal code: 6320
- Area code: (+36) 78
- Website: www.solt.hu

Solt (Croatian: Šolta) is a town in Bács-Kiskun county, Hungary. Near Solt, there is a high-power medium wave transmitter.

== History ==
=== Early Solt ===
The region has been populated since the Stone Age. The results of diggings brought up Roman coins, weapons and bodies. The road from the province of Pannonia to Dacia cut through Solt. The first written documents mentioning Solt date back to 1145. Solt was under the jurisdiction of the bishop of Kalocsa from the 11th until the 13th century.

=== Local legend ===
There is a local legend about the establishment of Solt, known as the Legend of the Golden Key. According to the legend, Béla IV of Hungary gave two golden keys to the town of Solt for hiding him from the invading Mongolian tribes. The keys were hidden on top of the local Presbyterian church which was hit by lightning. The keys melted and were never found again. Since then, they are only seen in the seal of the town.

=== Middle Ages ===
When Hungary was occupied by the Ottoman Empire, Solt lost much of its population. The town is mentioned many times during the Hungarian uprising against the Habsburgs; Francis II Rákóczi kept his army in the region.

In the second half of the 18th century, the North Hungarian nobility purchased the town and the surrounding area. The castles of Baron Révay, Graf Berchtold, Graf Nemes, Graf Vécsey, Graf Benyovszky, Graf Czebrián, Graf Pongrácz and the Graf Teleki family were built in the 19th century.

During the Revolution of 1848, Solt was an important camp of the Hungarian soldiers.

=== 20th Century ===
Hungary lost both world wars which caused death and destruction in Solt. Afterwards, the country was occupied by the Soviet army and communism spread quickly. Finally, after 1989, Hungary regained its independence and Solt started to rise again. The town is now home to many independent businesses.

In 1977, a 2000 kW medium-wave broadcasting station called Transmitter Solt was built. It is currently the most powerful radio transmitter in Europe.

== Notable residents ==
- Árpád Weisz (1896-1944), Hungarian Olympic football player and manager
