= High-rise of Pécs =

Coordinates: 46°04′24″N 18°12′47″E

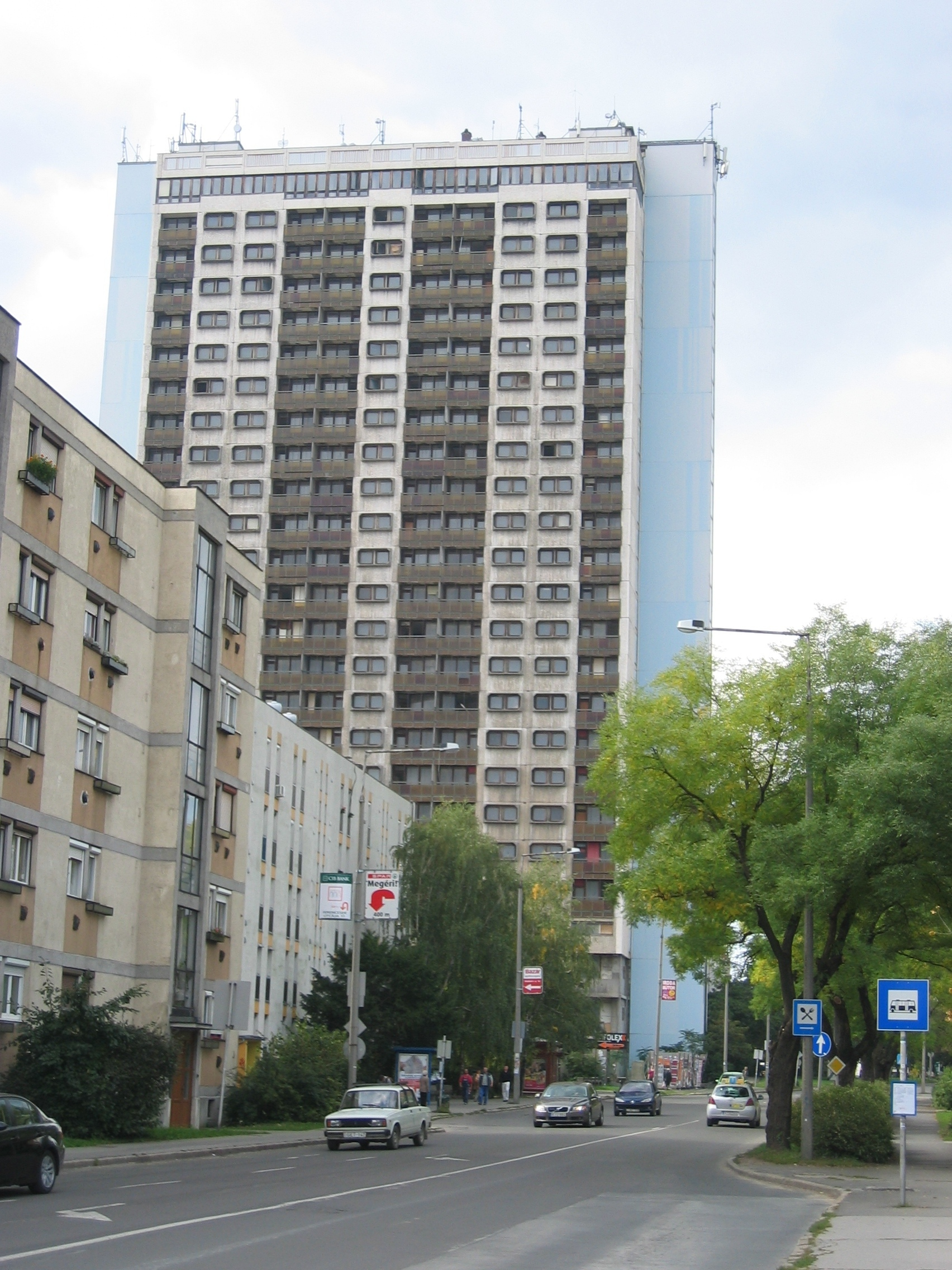
The High-rise

The High-rise of Pécs (in Hungarian Pécsi Magasház) was a high-rise residential building of 84 meters' height and 25 floors, in Pécs, Hungary. It was built between 1974 and 1976 by Baranya County State Construction Industry Company (Baranya Megyei Állami Építőipari Vállalat). When it was inhabited, it had 800 residences. In 1989, however, it was determined that the building's inner structure was deteriorating to a dangerous extent. The building was evacuated. Several plans were proposed to renovate and use the building for various purposes, but none of these were realized. By 2003 the building had fallen into a critical condition, so it was reinforced, but it remained out of use. It was the tallest out-of-use building in Central Europe until its deconstruction in 2016.

== History ==
The reinforced concrete structure of Magasház was built using Yugoslavian IMS post tensioning technology.

This technology was used to create residential and public buildings in Hungary since the early 1970s. The idea behind IMS was constructing premade floor slabs and columns, connecting them afterwards. The gaps between elements were filled with a sealant called PU paste. This filling material however, was known to cause chloride corrosion over time, damaging the beams and in Yugoslavia, they used an inhibitor material and also separated the paste from the tensioned posts with a 1mm thin plastic sheet but in Hungary, they skipped these despite only a very small amount of inhibitor would've been necessary. Because of this, the building became unstable, and the inhabitants had to move out by the year 1989.

In 2003 the local government paid 360 million Hungarian Forints for structural repairs. The building was sold for an Austrian company, the Porr Hungária Kft, to make it a dormitory for the University of Pécs in the PPP program. The company stepped back from the agreement in 2007.

In the fall of 2007, the city made an unsuccessful tender to convert the building into an office for the local government. Magasház was sold again in 2008 to the La Torre 2008 Kft, that accumulated significant debt over the years since.

No progress has been made in the utilization of the building until 2011, when the idea of selling Magasház to the company Öresund Holding incurred, so that it would be demolished, and a municipal building would be constructed in its place, that would be rented by the city for 30 years.

On 25 April 2013 the Second Cabinet of Viktor Orbán held a session in Pécs. Here, Viktor Orbán made a promise to mayor Zsolt Páva, that the government will give one billion Hungarian forints for the demolition of Magasház, if the city acquires the ownership of the building.

On 4 October 2013 the La Torre 2008 Kft. was acquired by a citizen of Pécs, the 76 years old pensioner Hosszú Zoltán Dénesné. The court of Komárom-Esztergom ordered the liquidation of the company on 16 October.

On 22 October 2013 the declaration of demolition for the building was issued, giving a six-month deadline for the owner.

Finally in March 2016 the demolishing started and the last walls of the building disappeared in October 2016.

=== Short summary of the history of Magasház ===
- 1974: beginning of the construction
- 1976: first inhabitants move in
- 1983: first signs of corrosion are noticed during an inspection
- 1988: after extensive inspections, the building was pronounced dangerously unstable
- 1989: inhabitants move out
- 2003: the frame is reinforced for 360 million Forints
- 2007: the Porr Hungária Kft gives the building back to the city
- 2008: La Torre 2008 Kft. acquires the building
- 2013: the declaration of demolition is issued
- 2015: preparations for the deconstruction commence
- 2016: deconstruction
