= Ikervár =

- Coat of arms

- Location of Ikervár in Hungary
- Coordinates: 47.20930°N 16.89530°E
- Country: Hungary
- Region: Western Transdanubia
- County: Vas
- Subregion: Sárvári
- Rank: Village

Area
  - Total: 35.34 km^{2} (13.64 sq mi)

Population (1 January 2008)
  - Total: 1,859
  - Density: 52.60/km^{2} (136.2/sq mi)
- Time zone: UTC+1 (CET)
  - Summer (DST): UTC+2 (CEST)
- Postal code: 9756
- Area code: +36 95
- KSH code: 11387
- Website: ikervar.iweb.hu

Ikervár is a village in Vas county, Hungary.
